= Waheed Murad filmography =

Considered one of the most famous and influential actors of South Asia, Waheed Murad started his film career when he was 21-years-old, making a cameo appearance in the 1959 film Saathi. The film Armaan, which Murad produced and starred in, made a pivotal impact on the Pakistani film industry and turned Murad into an overnight sensation. During his career, Murad achieved the highest number of platinum, diamond, golden, and silver jubilees of any film actor in Pakistan. In November 2010, 27 years after Murad's death, Pakistani President Asif Ali Zardari posthumously awarded Murad the Sitara-e-Imtiaz (Urdu: ستارہِ امتیاز, lit. 'Star of Excellence'), the third-highest honor and civilian award in the State of Pakistan.

== Filmography ==
By the end of his career, Waheed Murad had appeared in 124 films spanning the Urdu, Punjabi, and Pashto languages. He was awarded three Nigar Awards for Best Actor in the films Heera Aur Pathar (1964), Armaan (1966), and Andleeb (1969).

Year	Total Films	Urdu Films	Punjabi Films	Pashto Films	Diamond Jubilee	Platinum Jubilee	Golden Jubilee	Silver Jubilee
1962-1970	38	38	0	0	0	2	9	19
1971-1980	72	66	6	0	1	2	18	23
1981-1987	14	11	2	1	0	0	3	8
Total	124	115	8	1	1	4	30	50

=== Diamond jubilee films ===
Year	Title	Role
1976	Shabana	Anwar Sheikh

=== Platinum jubilee films ===
Year	Title	Role
1966	Armaan	Nasir Kahn
1970	Anjuman	Chota Bhai
1974	Ishq Mera Naa	Azeem
1978	Awaz	Haroon

=== Golden jubilee films ===
Year	Title	Role
1962	Aulad	
1964	Heera Aur Pathar	Jaanu
1965	Kaneez	Akhtar
1967	Devar Bhabhi	Khalid
1967	Ehsaan	Dr. Aamir
1968	Dil Mera Dharkan Teri	Shakeel
1969	Salgira	Advocate Anwar
1969	Andaleeb	
1971	Mastana Mahi	Raju
1971	Neend Hamari Khwab Tumhare	Anwar
1972	Khalish	
1972	Baharo Phool Barsao	Nawab Parvez Akhter
1972	Daulat Aur Duniya	Anwar Artist
1974	Tum Salamat Raho	Khurram
1974	Phool Mere Gulshan Ka	Behzaad
1974	Dushman	Khalid 'Shaukat'
1974	Shama	Dr. Amjad
1975	Mohabbat Zindagi Hai	Jameel
1975	Jogi	
1975	Soorat Aur Seerat	Rasheed 'Jameel'
1975	Jab Jab Phool Khile	Shehzada
1978	Saheli	Shehzad
1978	Parakh	Hero
1978	Khuda Aur Muhabbat	Jameeluddin 'Jimmy'
1978	Behan Bhai	Hamid
1980	Piyari	Iffi
1981	Kala Dhanda Goray Log	Zahid
1981	Kiran Aur Kali	Dr. Faraz

=== Silver jubilee films ===
Year	Title	Role
1965	Bahu Begum	
1965	Eid Mubarak	Nadeem
1966	Josh	
1966	Jaag Utha Insaan	
1966	Bhaiya	
1967	Do Raha	Nadeem
1967	Phir Subah Ho Gi	Raju
1967	Maa Baap	Akhtar Ali
1967	Rishta Hai Pyar Ka	
1967	Insaniyat	
1968	Samandar	Raja
1968	Jahan Tum Wahan Hum	
1969	Ishaara	Aamir
1969	Ladla	Javed
1969	Ik Nageena	Anwar Sheikh
1970	Afsana	Nasir
1970	Bewafa	Zahid
1970	Naseeb Apna Apna	Javed
1970	Chand Suraj	
1971	Afshan	Jamal
1972	Hill Station	Shahid
1972	Zindagi Aik Safar Hai	Nasir ud Deen Ahmed
1973	Jaal	Jehangir
1973	Anhoni	Shehzad Saith
1974	Pyar Hi Pyar	Raju
1974	Nanha Farishta	Arshad
1974	Haqeeqat	Khalid 'Arshad'
1974	Deedar	Sartaaj Ali Khan
1976	Zubaida	Arshad
1976	Waqt	Arshad
1976	Waada	Arif
1976	Goonj Uthi Shehnai	Mohammad Ashiq
1976	Aap Ka Khadim	Shahid
1977	Apne Huye Paraye	Shareef 'Sharfu'
1978	Nazrana	Kashif
1979	Waaday Ki Zanjeer	Arshad
1979	Yahan Se Wahan Tak	Murad
1979	Tarana	
1979	Nishani	Javed
1980	Zameer	Shaani
1980	Chotay Nawab	Jaani
1980	Badnaam	DSP Adil
1981	Gun Man	DSP Mehmood Inaamdar
1981	Mere Apne	Dr. Aamir
1981	Dil Ne Phir Yaad Kya	Hamid
1981	Gherao	Anwar
1981	Pakhtoon Pay Wilayat Kamba	
1982	I Love You	Aamir
1982	Aahat	Asif
1983	Maang Meri Bhar Do	Saleem Ali Khan
1985	Hero	Fateh Muhammad 'Fattu'

=== Box-office bombs ===
Year	Title	Role
1964	Mamta	
1965	Saaz Aur Awaz	
1965	Doctor	
1966	Honahar	Shaukat
1968	Jaan-e-Arzo	Asghar Hussain Arzo
1969	Tumhi Ho Mehboob Mere	Asif
1969	Maa Beta	Qaiser
1970	Phir Chand Nikle Ga	
1971	Afshan	Jamal
1971	Khamosh Nigahen	Saith Khalid
1971	Rim Jhim	Shahid
1972	Naag Muni	Dr. Anwar
1972	Bandagi	Dr. Nasir Sheikh
1973	Mulaqat	Shahid
1973	Khwab Aur Zindagi	Jameel
1974	Mastani Mehbooba	Prince Murad
1974	Sayyo Ni Mera Mahi	Jaani
1974	Usey Dekha Usey Chaha	
1974	Laila Majnu	Qais Aamri 'Majnu'
1975	Izzat	Asif Ali
1975	Dilruba	Jameel
1975	Sajjan Kamla	Wajid
1976	Rastey Ka Pathar	Anwar
1976	Naag Aur Nagin	Sheeshnag
1976	Mehboob Mera Mastana	Nasir
1976	Zaib-un-Nisa	Amjad Ali Khan
1976	Kharidar	Shahid
1976	Surraya Bhopali	Dildaar
1976	Jiyo Aur Jeenay Do	Ehsan
1976	Akh Lari Badu Badi	Heera
1977	Parastish	Shakeel Afendi
1978	Aadmi	Advocate Akhtar
1978	Insaan Aur Shaitan	Inspector Khalid Nawaz Khan
1978	Sheeshay Ka Ghar	
1979	Raja Ki Aye Gi Baraat	Chandu 'Chand Ali'
1979	Aurat Raj	
1980	Bandhan	Barrister Abdul Waheed Khan
1981	Anokha Daaj	Anwar
1982	Wohti Jee	Akhtar
1987	Zalzala	Inspector Waheed

== Cameo appearances ==
Year	Title	Role
1959	Saathi	
1963	Baaji	Visiter
1973	Khushiya	
1976	Ajj Di Taza Khabar	Waheed Murad
1978	Begunah	
1981	Parwah Nahi	Bhola

== Producer ==
Waheed Murad produced 11 films and received the Nigar Award for Best Producer of the film Armaan (1966).

Year	Title
1961	Insaan Badalta Hai
1962	Jab Se Dekha Hai Tumhay
1964	Heera Aur Pathar
1966	Armaan
1967	Ehsaan
1968	Samandar
1969	Ishara
1970	Naseeb Apna Apna
1971	Mastana Mahi
1973	Jaal
1985	Hero

== Director ==
Waheed Murad directed the film Ishara (1969).

== Writer ==
Waheed Murad wrote the films Armaan (1966), Ehsaan (1967), Ishara (1969), and Hero (1985).

== Singer ==
Year	Film Title	Song Performed
1968	Samandar	"Tera Mera Saathi Hai Lehrata Samandar" written by Sehba Akhtar
1969	Ishara	"Jaisay Taise Beet Gaya Din, Raat Bitao Kaise" written by Maswoor Anwar
