= Mohammad Ali filmography =

Performances by Pakistani actor

Complete filmography of Pakistani actor Mohammad Ali

== Filmography ==
Year	Title	Character/role	Genre	Verdict/notes
1962	Chiragh Jalta Raha	Villain	Art movie	Silver Jubilee (25-week run in theaters). Won Silver Screen Award.
1962	Daal Mein Kaala	Villain	Suspense movie	
1963	Dil ne tujhe maan liya	Villain	Suspense movie	
1963	Baji	Guest appearance		
1963	Shararat			First movie as a film hero
1963	Mr. X		Suspense movie	
1963	Qatal ke baad	Guest appearance	Suspense movie	
1964	Ghadaar		Costume movie	
1964	Khandan	Double role	Suspense movie	Silver Jubilee
1964	Safaid Khoon		Suspense movie	
1964	Bees din		Suspense movie	
1964	Khamosh Raho		Social	Silver Jubilee, Won Nigar award for best supporting actor
1964	Head Constable			Silver Jubilee
1964	Aurat ka pyar	Villain		
1964	Chhoti Behan			
1964	Sher di Bachi			Punjabi movie
1965	Aisa Bhi Hota Hai	Guest appearance		Golden Jubilee
1965	Riwaaj			Silver Jubilee
1965	Dil Ke Tukre			Silver Jubilee
1965	Tamasha	Guest appearance		
1965	Shabnam			Silver Jubilee
1965	Hazar Dastaan	Double role	Tillsammans costume movie	Silver Jubilee
1965	Nache Nagan baje Been			
1965	Kaneez			Golden Jubilee (50-week run in theaters) Won Nigar Award for Best Actor
1965	Sanam			Silver Jubilee
1965	Mujahid		Art, historical movie about 1965 war	Silver Jubilee
1965	Khota Paisa			Silver Jubilee
1966	Mr. Allah Ditta	Guest	Historical movie	
1966	Tasveer	Guest appearance		
1966	Malangi	Guest appearance		Silver Jubilee
1966	Aag Ka Darya	Robber	Action movie	Golden Jubilee, Won Nigar award for Best actor
1966	Watan ka Sipahi		Art historical movie	Silver Jubilee
1966	Mojaza	Guest appearance	Art movie	
1966	Hamrahi	Special appearance		Golden Jubilee
1966	Bhai Jan			
1966	Jaag Utha Insan	Patriotic	Historical movie	Golden Jubilee
1966	Aadil		Costume movie	Silver Jubilee (Actor/Producer)
1966	Akeley na jana			
1966	Baghi Sardar		Costume movie	Silver Jubilee
1966	Ghar ka ujala			
1966	Naghma-e-Sehra		Costume movie	
1966	Madr-e-Watan		Art historical movie	
1966	Lori		Romantic	Golden Jubilee
1966	Janbaz		Costume movie	
1966	Aina			Golden Jubilee
1967	Bahadur	Villain	Costume movie	Silver Jubilee
1967	Jan Pehchan		Cinema scope, Suspense movie	Mohammad Ali's 1st Colour Movie
1967	Sajda		Costume movie	Silver Jubilee
1967	Waqt ki pukar	Guest	Suspense movie	
1967	Hatim Tai		Tillsamman Historical costume movie	Silver Jubilee
1967	Imam Din Gohavia	Villain	Historical movie	Punjabi film
1967	Hamraz		Suspense movie	
1967	Aag	Romantic Comedian	Romantic comedy	Golden Jubilee (Ali-Zeb Production)
1967	Wohti	Guest appearance		Punjabi film
1968	Lala Rukh		Costume movie	
1968	Mehal		Costume movie	Golden Jubilee
1968	Pakeeza	Villain		
1968	Yaar Dost			Punjabi film
1968	Mujhe jeene do			Silver Jubilee
1968	Dil diya dard liya			Silver Jubilee
1968	Soney ki Chirrya			
1968	Saiqa		Drama, Romantic, Comedy	Golden Jubilee, Won Nigar award for best actor
1968	Paristan		Tillsammans costume movie	
1968	Mera Ghar Meri Jannat	Double role		Silver Jubilee
1968	Balam	Guest appearance		
1968	Taj Mehal	Prince	Historical Romantic Costume movie	Silver Jubilee
1968	Shahi Mehal		Costume movie	
1969	Tum mile pyar mila			Silver Jubilee
1969	Neela Parbat	Ahmad Bashir	Art movie	
1969	Asra			Silver Jubilee
1969	Piya milan ki aas			
1969	Jaise jante naheen		Romantic, Drama	Silver Jubilee(Ali-Zeb Production)
1969	Zindagi kitni haseen hai		Romantic	Silver Jubilee
1969	Bahu Rani			Silver Jubilee
1969	Dil-e-betab			Silver Jubilee
1969	Geet kahin Sangeet kahin			
1969	Naaz			Silver Jublee
1969	Baharen phir bhi aayen gi			Silver Jubilee
1969	Aanch			Silver Jublee
1970	Anjaan	Innocent		Silver Jubilee
1970	Aansoo ban geye Moti	Double role		Silver Jubilee
1970	Baazi	Character	Romantic drama	Silver Jubilee(colour Movie)
1970	Insaan aur Aadmi	Advocate		Golden Jubilee, Won Nigar Award for Best Actor
1970	Noreen			Silver Jubilee
1970	Be qasoor			Silver Jubilee
1970	Mohabbat rang laye gi			
1970	Najma			A colour film
1970	Ek Phool ek Pathar			Silver Jubilee
1971	Duniya naa maney			Silver Jubilee
1971	Yadein			
1971	Teri surat meri Ankhen			Golden Jubilee
1971	Insaaf aur Qanoon		Drama, thriller	Silver Jubilee
1971	Wehshi			Silver Jubilee, Won Nigar Award for Best Actor
1971	Salaam-e-Mohabbat		Romantic	Silver Jubilee
1971	Karishma		Art movie	
1971	Ansoo bahaye Pathron ne		Suspense movie	
1971	Dil aur duniya	Special appearance		Platinum Jubilee(75 weeks in theaters)
1971	Khak aur Khoon			Silver Jubilee
1972	Afsana zindgi ka			Golden Jubilee
1972	Mere Hamsafar	Agency Officer	Suspense movie	Golden Jubilee (Shot in London)
1972	Ilzaam			Silver Jubilee
1972	Badley gi Duniya Sathi			
1972	Mohabbat			Silver Jubilee
1972	Dil ik Aina			Silver Jubilee
1972	Sabbaq		Art Movie	Golden Jubilee
1973	Sarhad ki gode mein		Historical movie	Silver Jubilee
1973	Gharana		Family drama	Golden Jubilee
1973	Naya raasta			Silver Jubilee
1973	Aas		Romantic drama	Golden Jubilee, Won Nigar Award for Best actor
1973	Zakhmi			
1973	Daman Aur Chingari		Romantic drama	Golden Jubilee
1973	Khushia	Guest appearance		Punjabi
1973	Nadiya ke paar		Art classical Movie	Silver Jubilee
1974	Samaj			Golden Jubilee
1974	Bano Rani			Silver Jubilee
1974	Parchhaen			
1974	Tiger Gang	Police Officer	Suspense movie	Pakistan-Germany Production
1974	Aabroo		Family drama	Silver Jubilee
1974	Tum salamat raho			Golden Jubilee
1974	Aina aur Soorat	Villager	Drama	Golden Jubilee, Won Nigar Award for Best Actor
1974	Phool Mere Gulshan Ka		Family drama	Golden Jubilee
1974	Nanha Farishta		Family drama	Silver Jubilee
1974	Haqeeqat	Robber	Action	Silver Jubilee
1974	Dushman		Action	Golden Jubilee
1974	Qismat			Golden Jubilee
1974	Shama			Golden Jubilee
1974	Deedar	Title		
1975	Be-misal			Silver Jubilee
1975	Bin Badal Barsat			Golden Jubilee
1975	Paisa			Silver Jubilee
1975	Aarzoo			Golden Jubilee
1975	Milap			
1975	Shirin Farhad		Romantic Costume Movie	Silver Jubilee
1975	Tere mere Sapney			Platinum Jubilee
1975	Mohabbat Zindagi hai		Romantic drama	Golden Jubilee
1975	Moashira			Silver Jubilee
1975	Shikwa			Silver Jubilee
1975	Gumrah	Double role		
1975	Isar			Silver Jubilee
1975	Aik Gunnah Aur Sahi			Golden Jubilee
1975	Professor			
1975	Paalki			Silver Jubilee
1975	Bikhrey Moti			Silver Jubilee
1975	Surat aur Seerat	Gambler	Drama, Action, Thriller	Golden Jubilee
1975	Ajnabi			
1975	Jub Jub Phool Khile		Family Drama	Golden Jubilee
1975	Badal geya Insaan			
1975	Neik Perveen			Silver Jubilee
1975	Noukar			Golden Jubilee
1975	Allah Akbar	Voice over	Islamic History	
1976	Raja Jani	Double Role, Hero&Villain	Action, Thriller	Silver Jubilee
1976	Raste ka pathar	Guest appearance		
1976	Aag aur Ansoo			
1976	Aurat ek paheli		Family drama	Silver Jubilee
1976	Daagh			
1976	Daman ki Aag			
1976	Kharidar	Character		Silver Jubilee
1976	An-Daata		Action, thriller	Golden Jubilee English Novel
1976	Nasheman		Romantic drama	Silver Jubilee
1976	Dharkan			Silver Jubilee
1976	Goonj uthi Shehnai			Silver Jubilee
1976	Aap ka Khadim			Silver Jubilee
1976	Phool aur Sholay			Silver Jubilee
1977	Bharosa		Romantic comedy	Platinum Jubilee
1977	Pehli Nazar	Don	Art movie(Pakistan Independence)	Silver Jubilee
1977	Jeeney ki rah			Silver Jubilee
1977	Naya Suraj			(Independence Movie)
1977	Roti Kapra aur Insan		Art movie	Silver Jubilee
1977	Tipu Sultan		Art Historic biographical film	Silver Jubilee
1977	Kalu	Criminal	Action, Thriller	Golden Jubilee
1977	Apne huye praye			Silver Jubilee
1977	Salakhein		Family Drama	Golden Jubilee (Super Performance)
1978	Aag aur Zindgi			Silver Jubilee
1978	Amber		Romantic, comedy, drama	Platinum Jubilee
1978	Dil ke Dagh			Silver Jubilee
1978	Millan	Double role		Golden Jubilee
1978	Aadmi	Criminal		Silver Jubilee
1978	Kora Kaghaz	Double role		Silver Jubilee
1978	Baraat			Silver Jubilee
1978	Intekhab			Platinum Jubilee
1978	Takrao		Action Movie	Silver Jubilee
1978	Inqalab	Double Role		
1978	Do Daku			Silver Jubilee
1978	Haidar Ali		Historic costume movie	Silver Jubilee, Won Nigar Award for Best Actor
1978	Seeta Maryam Margaret			Silver Jubilee
1978	Khuda aur Mohabbat			Silver Jubilee
1978	Awaz			Platinum Jubilee
1978	Achhey Mian			Golden Jubilee
1979	Behan Bhai			Golden Jubilee
1979	Waaday Ki Zanjeer			
1979	Chori Chori			Golden Jubilee
1979	Naqsh-e-Qadam			Silver Jubilee
1979	Raja ki aye gi Baraat			
1979	Ibadat			Silver Jubilee
1979	Josh			Golden Jubilee
1979	General Bakht Khan	Guest	Historical costume movie	
1979	Aap se kya Parda			Golden Jubilee
1979	Dehshat	Guest appearance		Punjabi film
1979	Aag			Silver Jubilee
1980	Zameer			silver Jubilee
1980	Badnaam			Silver Jubilee
1981	Manzil		Suspense	Platinum Jubilee
1981	Bara Aadmi			Golden Jubilee
1981	Sangram			Golden Jubilee
1981	Gun Man			Silver Jubilee
1981	Sheran de puttar sher	Guest		Punjabi film
1981	Watan			Silver Jubilee
1981	Faslay			Silver Jubilee
1981	Kiran aur Kali			Golden Jubilee
1981	Ghaerao			Silver Jubilee
1981	Tange wali			Silver Jubilee
1981	Khote Sikkey			Silver Jubilee
1982	Kinara		Art movie	Silver Jubilee
1982	Naseeb			Platinum Jubilee
1982	Meherbani			Golden Jubilee
1982	Tere bina kya jeena			Golden Jubilee
1982	Saharey		Art movie	Silver Jubilee
1982	Zara si baat			
1983	Bigri Naslen	Character	Art movie	Silver Jubilee
1983	Ik dooje ke liye			Golden Jubilee
1983	Aaj ki raat		Suspense movie	Silver Jubilee
1983	Maang meri bhar do			Silver Jubilee
1983	Border built			
1983	Kainat			Silver Jubilee
1983	Tina	Don	Action, Thriller	Platinum Jubilee
1983	Bheegay badan			Silver Jubilee
1983	Badaltey rishtey			Silver Jubilee
1983	Wadda Khan			Punjabi (Successful In Lahore)
1984	Muqaddar ka siqandar			Silver Jubilee
1984	Doorian	Governor		Golden Jubilee, Won Nigar Special Award for Best Performance
1984	Naam mera badnam			Silver Jubilee
1984	Haibat Khan			Silver Jubilee(Punjabi)
1984	Barood			Silver Jubilee
1984	Andhi aur toofan			Silver Jubilee
1984	Bobby	Don	Action drama	Diamond Jubilee (100 Weeks Run In Theaters), Won Nigar Special Award for Best Performance
1984	Naseebon wali			Silver Jubilee
1984	Aag ka samunder		Historical movie	Silver Jubilee
1984	Dil maa da	Guest		Punjabi film
1985	Mehak			Silver Jubilee
1985	Ek dulhan			Silver Jubilee
1985	Jeenay nahi doon gi			Golden Jubilee
1985	Khoon aur pani			Golden Jubilee
1985	Shah Behram			Silver Jubilee(Punjabi)
1985	Ghulami			Successful In Lahore (Punjabi language film)
1985	Direct hawaldar	Guest		Golden Jubilee
1985	Zaman pegham			Pushto film
1986	Zanjeer			Silver Jubilee
1986	Baat ban jaye			Silver Jubilee
1986	Hum ek hain	Guest	Cinema scope	Golden Jubilee
1986	Shak			
1986	Qatil ki talaash	Police Officer	Cinema scope	Silver Jubilee
1986	White gold	Smuggler		Silver Jubilee(Shot in America)
1986	Ek hi raasta			Silver Jubilee
1986	Qarz	Title role		Successful In Lahore (Punjabi language film)
1986	Miyan biwi aur woh			Silver Jublee
1987	Aag aur sholay			(Shot In Thailand)
1987	Qasam munney ki	Guest		Silver Jubilee
1987	Deewar			Silver Jubilee
1987	Masti Khan	Guest appearance		Silver Jubilee
1987	Teri baahon mein			Silver Jubilee
1987	Rocky Dada			
1987	Doye dakku			Pushto film
1988	Chann Punjab da	Villain		only released in Lahore (Punjabi)
1988	Daplar arman			Pushto film
1989	Mohabbat ho to aisi			
1989	Kirai ke Qatil	Title role		
1989	Shaani		Scientific Movie	Silver Jubilee
1989	Clerk			Indian Movie
1989	Junoon	Guest appearance		
1990	Jaaney anjaaney			Golden Jubilee (also released in Bangladesh)
1990	Kufro-o-Islam			Pashto film
1990	Damoor inteqam	Guest appearance		Pashto film
1991	Truck driver			Pashto film
1991	Dushman kaka	Guest appearance		Pashto film
1991	Yohnavey			Pashto film
1992	Haseeno ki baraat	Guest	Cinema scope	
1995	Dum must Qalandar	Guest appearance		
