= Babra Sharif filmography =

Filmography of Babra Sharif

This is a complete filmography of Pakistani actress and model Babra Sharif.

== Television series ==
Year	Title	Role	Network
1973	Kiran Kahani	Seema	PTV
1992	Nadan Nadia	Nadia	PTV
2000	Main Hu Na	Sohni	PTV

== Film ==
Release	Film	Ref.
1974	Intazar	
1974	Bhool	
1974	Haqeeqat	
1974	Shama	
1975	Ajnabi	
1975	Mera naa Patey Khan	
1975	Mera Naam Hai Mohabbat	
1975	Maasoom	
1975	Noukar	
1976	Ajj di taza khabar	
1976	Chor noo mor	
1976	Adhori Jawani	
1976	Aansoo aur Sholay	
1976	Zubaida	
1976	Talash	
1976	Aag aur Aansoo	
1976	Waqt	
1976	Nasheman	
1976	Shabana	
1977	Beti	
1977	Insaan	
1977	Jawani Deewani	
1977	Mehman	
1977	Pyar ka waada	
1977	Aashi	
1977	Dard	
1977	Pehli Nazar	
1977	Salakhen	
1978	Dushman ki talash	
1978	Ik chehra do roop	
1978	Mazi, haal aur mustaqbil	
1978	Mousam hai aashqana	
1978	Kora Kaghaz	
1978	Barat	
1978	Prince	
1978	Play Boy	
1978	Zindagi	
1978	Khuda aur Mohabbat	
1979	Kis naam se pukarun	
1979	Miss Hong Kong	
1979	Nei Tehzeeb	
1979	Josh	
1979	Aag	
1980	Chotay Nawab	
1980	Saima	
1980	Badnaam	
1980	Daaman	
1981	Alladin	
1981	Do Dil	
1981	Laggan	
1981	Mohabbat aur majboori	
1981	Wafa	
1981	Yeh Zamana aur hai	
1981	Manzil	
1981	Lajawab	
1981	Bara Aadmi	
1981	Gun Man	
1981	Dil ne phir yaad kya	
1981	Khotay Sikkey	
1982	Ek Din Bahu Ka	
1982	Jan-e-Mann	
1982	Sangdil	
1982	Aas Paas	
1982	Aangan	
1982	Meherbani	
1982	Tere bina kya jeena	
1983	Sarelambe	
1983	Teena	
1983	Ik dooje ke liye	
1983	Border Built	
1983	Kainat	
1983	Tina	
1983	Badalte rishte	
1984	Miss Colombo	
1984	Zama pecham	
1985	Haq Mehr	
1985	Hong Kong ke Sholay	
1985	Miss Singapore	
1985	Palkon ki chhaon mein	
1985	Hero	
1985	Mehak	
1985	Parwana	
1985	Deewane do	
1985	Khoon aur Pani	
1985	Zaman pegham	
1986	Be-qarar	
1986	Miss Bangkok	
1986	Qatil Ki Tallish	
1986	Ek hi rasta	
1987	Duniya	
1987	Griban	
1987	Lady Smuggler	
1987	Mera Insaaf	
1987	Sun of AnnDaata	
1987	Qasm Munney ki	
1987	Kundan	
1987	Deevar	
1987	Love in London	
1988	Baghi Haseena	
1988	Chakkar	
1988	Daku ki Larki	
1988	Ik Shehnshah	
1988	Jatt Majhe da	
1988	Maa bani Dulhan	
1988	Mukhra	
1989	Barish	
1989	Da Daku aur	
1989	Dushan Dada	
1989	Dushmano ke Dushman	
1989	Ishq rog	
1989	Lady Commando	
1989	Saathi	
1989	Shaani	
1989	Karaye ke Qatil	
1990	Choron ka Dushman	
1990	International Guerillas	
1990	Kala Pani	
1990	Kali	
1990	Makhan Gujjar	
1990	Miss Cleopatra	
1990	Qudrat da inteqam	
1990	Gori dian Jhanjhran	
1990	Aasman	
1990	Ustadon ke Ustad	
1991	Akhri shikar	
1991	Inteshar	
1991	Lahori Badmash	
1991	Zid	
1992	Consular	
1992	Raz	
1992	Khooni Sholay	
1992	Shehzada	
1993	Khwahish	
1993	Zabata	
1994	Dostana	
1994	Piyasa Sawan	
1994	Sarkata Insaan	
1995	Ham nahin ya tum nahin	
1996	Sajawal	
1997	Ghail	
2001	Gharana	
