= Yeh Adam =

1986 film

- Punjabi: ਯੇ ਆਦਮ
- Directed by: Irshad Sajid
- Written by: Nasir Adeeb
- Story by: Nasir Adeeb
- Based on: Humanity Is The Greatest Worship
- Produced by: Masood Sarwar Rathore; M. Abdullah
- Starring: Sultan Rahi; Aasia; Masood Akhtar; Aliya Begum; Mehboob Alam; Mustafa Qureshi; Adeeb; Allauddin
- Cinematography: Irshad Ahmed
- Edited by: M. Sarwar
- Music by: Nazir Ali
- Production company: A.M Studio
- Distributed by: Badshah Productions
- Release date: 11 April 1986 (Pakistan)
- Running time: 2:38:17
- Country: Pakistan
- Language: Punjabi

Yeh Adam (Punjabi: یہ آدم) is a 1986 Pakistani-Punjabi-language action-political film directed by Irshad Sajid, written by Nasir Adeeb and produced by Bashir Ahmad Butt.

== Cast ==
- Sultan Rahi - (as Hasoo)
- Aasia - (as Sheedan)
- Aliya Begum - (as Sabira)
- Masood Akhtar - (as Nasir)
- Nimmi - (as Razia)
- Afzal Khan - (as Ustad Seeda)
- Zummard - (as Anju Bhai)
- Mehboob Alam - (as Chaudhary)
- Manuwar Saeed - (as Thanedaar)
- Munir Zarif - (as Jimmi)
- Afzaal Ahmad - (as Dewana)
- Allauddin - (as Baba Jee)
- Mustafa Qureshi - (as Billa Pehlwan)
- Adeeb (as Police Officer)
- Rehan - (as Judge1)
- Saqi- (as Judge2)

== Songs (album) ==
For all film songs, music composer was Nazir Ali & M. Javed and film song lyrics were written by Waris Ludhyanvi.

- Noor Jehan
- Mehnaz
- Rubina Badar
- Masood Rana
- Shaukat Ali
- Alam Lohar

Yeh Adam Album - Track listing
No.	Title	Lyrics	Music	Singer(s)	Length
1.	"Sach Nu Na Chhaddin, Pawen Saah Muk Jan.."		Nazir Ali	Masood Rana	4:10
2.	"Chhoti Jail Wichun Nikal Kay Yaaro, Waddi Jail Wich Aaye."	Waris Ludhyanvi	Nazir Ali	Mehnaz	4:04
3.	"Kali Gutt Tay Paranda Mera Lal."	Waris Ludhyanvi	Nazir Ali	Noor Jehan	4:21
4.	"Tu Janj Lay Aaja Sohneya."	Waris Ludhyanvi	Nazir Ali	Noor Jehan	3:25
5.	"Allah Allah Allah, Haq Allah Ho.."	Waris Ludhyanvi	Nazir Ali	Alam Lohar	6:28
6.	"Kali Kamli (Saw) Waleya Sohnya.."	Waris Ludhyanvi	Nazir Ali	Rubina Badar & Shaukat Ali	6:44
Total length:					29:13
