= Nai Laila Naya Majnu =

1969 film

- نئی لیلیٰ نیا مجنوں
- Directed by: Munawar Rasheed
- Screenplay by: Iqbal Rizvi
- Story by: Niazi Malik
- Produced by: Niazi Malik
- Starring: Naseema Khan; Kemal; Aliya; Lehri; Asad Bukhari
- Cinematography: M. Fazil
- Music by: Tassaduq Hussain
- Production company: Niazi Films
- Release date: 27 February 1969
- Country: Pakistan
- Language: Urdu

Nai Laila Naya Majnu is a 1969 Pakistani Urdu romantic comedy film directed by Munawar Rasheed.

The lead cast included Naseema Khan, Kemal, Aliya, Lehri, and Asad Bukhari.

== Awards ==
This film won 2 Nigar Awards in different categories.

== Plot ==
The film tells humorous love stories of two boys Jamal and Shahid with two modern girls Salma and Shamim. Jamal wants to fool Salma and Salma was thinking that she had fooled Jamal. On the other hand, Shamim and Shahid are also having fun with each other, even Shahid is beaten up by Shamim's friends in this fun. Jamal's mother is a conservative woman who wants to marry her son among her relatives. Jamal was crazy about Salma. Nai Laila Nai Majnu, as the meetings continued, the talk became interesting and beyond mischief, the story began to turn into love. Salma's father Seth Masood has also arranged his daughter's marriage with one of his loved ones.

Salma and Jamal perform a dramatic prank against their parents' relationship, Jamal acts blind and Salma stops her wedding by becoming lame. In this way, the relationship established by their parents ends. Jamal's mother and Salma's father together arrange the marriage of both. On the day of the wedding, both of them lie to their parents that they staged this drama to stop their arranged marriages, with the support of Shamim and Shahid, both of Seth Masood and Jamal's mother. After this fact, Jamal and Salma's marriage is stopped, but the doctor gets both parents to agree. The marriage of Seth Masood, Shahid and Shami is also fixed on the same day and arranged for marriage. Jamal and Salma, Shamim and Shahid get married.

== Cast ==
- Naseema Khan — as Salma
- Kemal — as Jamal
- Aliya — as Shamim
- Lehri — as Shahid
- Asad Bukhari
- Ilyas Kashmiri
- Niggo
- Salma Mumtaz
- Azad
- Khalifa Nazir
- Meena Chodhary
- Shahida
- Raj Multani
- Ijaz Akhtar
- Agha Dilraj
- Badar Munir

== Music and soundtracks ==
The playback music was composed by Tassaduq Hussain and Mouj Lakhnavi was the lyricist:

- Aaja, Yun Meri Palkon Mein Aa, Chhayya Chhayya... Singer(s): Mala, Tani Begum
- Dekhiye, Beebio, Yeh Haseen Aur Hayn Aur Woh Dilruba... Singer(s): Ahmad Rushdi, Mala
- Dil Dil Say Milay, Phool Khilay, Pyar Mila Hay... Singer(s): Mala, Tani & Co.
- Haseena Dilruba, Zara Samnay Aa, Mujhay Tu Na Sata... Singer(s): Ahmad Rushdi, Mala
- Janay Mujhay Kya Ho Geya Hay, Kaisa Nasha Chhanay Laga Hay... Singer(s): Mala, Masood Rana & Co.
- Meray Hamsafar, Tum Baray Sangdil Ho... Singer(s): Masood Rana, Mala
- Nadiya Kay Beech Gori, Halchal Machaye Ray... Singer(s): Masood Rana, Mala
- O Meri Mehbooba, Batla Do Kya Hua... Singer(s): Ahmad Rushdi, Mala
- Tu Hay Nayii Laila, Main Hun Naya Majnu... Singer(s): Ahmad Rushdi

== Release and box office ==
Nai Laila Naya Majnu was released on 21 February 1969. It was crowned as a platinum jubilee hit with 76 theatrical weeks.

== Awards ==
Year	Award	Category	Awardee	Ref.
1969	Nigar Award	Best Supporting Actress	Aliya	
1969	Nigar Award	Best Comedian	Lehri	
