= Tasleem Fazli =

Pakistani poet, lyricist and dialogue writer (1947–1982)

- Born: Izhar Anwar; 1947; Delhi, British India
- Died: 17 August 1982 (aged 34–35); Karachi, Sindh, Pakistan
- Other name: Taslim Fazli
- Occupations: Poet; Lyricist; Songwriter
- Years active: 1968 - 1982
- Spouse: Nisho (m. 1978–1982)
- Children: 1
- Parent: Dua Dabaivi (father)
- Relatives: Nida Fazli (brother); Saba Fazli (brother)
- Awards: Won 3 Nigar Awards in 1976, 1977 and 1980

Izhar Anwar, also known as Tasleem Fazli (1947 – 17 August 1982), was a Pakistani Urdu poet, lyricist and dialogue writer in both Urdu literature and Pakistani cinema.

== Early life ==
Tasleem Fazli was born in New Delhi in 1947. He was born into a Kashmiri Muslim family and grew up in Gwalior during British India. His father Syed Murtaza Husain, also known as Dua Dabaivi, was also a well-known Urdu poet. Two of his other brothers, Nida Fazli and Saba Fazli, were similarly prominent in music and media. In 1965, eighteen years after the partition of India, his parents and other family members migrated to Pakistan. Tasleem's family settled first in Lahore, later they moved to Karachi.

== Career ==
Tasleem was approached by director Shaukat Hussain Rizvi to write a song for his film Ashiq which he accepted and composed multiple songs. Tasleem became known for the song "Dinwa Dinwa Main Ginnun Kab Aayenge Saanwariya" which he wrote for the film Ashiq.

He received several offers to write songs for other films. He was a lyricist for Pakistani films throughout the 1960s and 1970s, contributing to more than 170 movies and writing 493 film songs. Some of his well-known works include songs in the films Hill Station (1972), Aap Ka Khadim (1976) and Black Warrant (1982). He won Nigar Awards for best lyrics in films such as Shabana, Aina and Bandish.

According to the veteran Pakistan Television Corporation producer/director Khawaja Najmul Hassan, "I was doing a program 'Andaz Apna Apna' at the time (in the 1980s). Khalil Ahmed composed the tune and we asked Farida Khanum to sing it. The song was Mein nay pairon main payal tou bandhey nahin". It was poet Tasleem Fazli's last wish that she sing this song.

== Personal life ==
He married Nisho, a popular actress of 1970s, and they had one daughter – Ayesha Fazli. Later, Ayesha married Ali Raza Khan, son of film actress Firdous Begum.

== Illness and death ==
Tasleem Fazli died of a heart attack in Karachi on 17 August 1982, at the age of 35.

== Filmography ==
=== Film ===
Year	Film	Language
1968	Ashiq	Urdu
1969	Salgira	Urdu
1972	Hill Station	Urdu
1973	Aas	Urdu
1974	Shama	Urdu
1976	Aap Ka Khadim	Urdu
1976	Shabana	Urdu
1976	Society Girl	Urdu
1977	Aina	Urdu
1980	Badaltay Mousam	Urdu
1980	Chotay Nawab	Urdu
1980	Bandish	Urdu
1982	Black Warrant	Urdu
1982	I Love You	Urdu
1985	Hero	Urdu
1985	Deewanay Do	Urdu
1985	Black Mail	Urdu
1987	Zalzala	Urdu
1988	Maa Bani Dulhan	Urdu

== Awards and recognition ==
Year	Award	Category	Result	Title	Ref.
1976	Nigar Awards	Best Lyricist	Won	Shabana	
1977	Nigar Awards	Best Lyricist	Won	Aina	
1980	Nigar Awards	Best Lyricist	Won	Bandish	
