= Des Pardes (1983 film) =

1983 film

- Directed by: Iftikhar Khan
- Written by: Nasir Adeeb
- Produced by: Zulfiqar Ali Khan; Tariq Azim Khan
- Starring: Sultan Rahi; Aasia; Mustafa Qureshi; Chakori; Bahar; Shugafta; Tariq Javed; Afzaal Ahmed; Aliya Begum; Iqbal Durrani
- Cinematography: Kamran Mirza
- Edited by: Asghar
- Music by: Ustad Tafu
- Production company: Evernew Studio
- Release date: 6 May 1983 (Pakistan)
- Running time: 165 minutes
- Country: Pakistan
- Language: Punjabi

Des Pardes is a 1983 Punjabi Pakistani, drama, action and musical film, directed by Iftikhar Khan and produced by Zulfiqar Ali Khan.

== Cast ==
- Sultan Rahi – Babar
- Aasia – Rano
- Mustafa Qureshi – Jakpal
- Chakori – Miss Rita
- Afzaal Ahmed – Tariq
- Bahar – Babar (Mother)
- Tariq Javed – London Seth
- Aliya Begum –
- Shagufta
- Iqbal Durrani
- Rehan
- Piya
- Changezi
- Badal
- Khawar Abbas
- Asif Qureshi
- Ilyas Kashmiri

== Track list ==
Music of this film is composed by Tafoo, film song lyrics are by Khawaja Pervez

#	Title	Singer(s)
1	"Sut Sumandar Par Toun"	Noor Jahan
2	"Tere Wul Takna Tak Ke Nayi Rujna"	Noor Jahan
3	"Main Te Bun Gayi Walayti Nar Wey"	Naheed Akhtar
4	"Tu Ghabroo Punjab Da Sajna"	Noor Jahan
5	"Tu Ghabroo Punjab Da Sajna"	Naheed Akhtar
