= Zaib-un-Nisa =

Zaib-un-Nisa may refer to:

- Zaib-un-Nisa (TV series), a 2000 Pakistani television series
- Zaib-un-Nisa (film), a 1976 Pakistani film
