= Rozina (Pakistani actress) =

Pakistani film actress (born 1950)

Rozina روزینہ
- Born: Ivy Cynthia; 21 September 1950 (age 76); Karachi, Pakistan
- Other names: The Lipton Girl; The Glamorous Actress; Ayesha Qureshi
- Education: St Joseph's Convent School, Karachi
- Occupations: Actress; Model
- Years active: 1963 – 2004
- Spouse: Riffat Qureshi (husband)
- Children: Saima Qureshi (daughter)
- Relatives: Faysal Quraishi (nephew); Afshan Qureshi (cousin); Abid Qureshi (cousin); Daniyal Khan (grandson)
- Awards: Nigar Award for best supporting actress (1968)

Ayesha Qureshi, best known by her screen name Rozina (Urdu: روزینہ; born 21 September 1950), is a Pakistani film actress. She was popularly known as The Lipton Girl and The Glamorous Actress due to her stylish and fashion roles by critics and viewers. She is known for her work in the movies like Armaan (1966), Josh (1966), Ehsaan (1967), Ishara (1968), Tum Hi Ho Mehboob Mere (1969), Khamosh Nigahen (1971), Basheera (1972), and Daulat Aur Dunya (1972). She won a Nigar Award for best supportive actress in the movie Ishara (1968). Rozina is the mother of model/actress Saima Qureshi and the aunt of actor/producer Faysal Quraishi.

== Early life ==
Rozina was born in a Sindhi family, as Ayesha Qureshi, on 21 September 1950, in Karachi. In the early 1960s, she lived with her sister, Raheela, and her mother at Pakistan Chowk, Karachi. She was educated at St. Joseph School Karachi.

== Career ==
Rozina started her career with the film "Hamein Bhi Jeenay Do" in 1963 as a supporting actress. She gradually progressed from supporting to leading roles in films. Her first film as a heroine was Ishqe Habib (1965) which was based on a religious theme. She was paired with the romantic hero Waheed Murad in several notable movies like, Josh (1966), Khamosh Nigahen (1971), and Daulat Aur Dunya (1972). She was labelled as a "glamorous actress" by critics and viewers. After working in 61 Urdu and 32 Punjabi films, Rozina ended her cinema career with her last movie, Hum Ek Hain, that was released in 2004. She acted in 100 films during her film career spanning over 3 decades.

== In the commercials ==
In the late 1960s, Rozina gained enormous popularity by appearing in a 'Lipton' tea jingle along with Nirala for Pakistan television. She also showed her face in a Lux advertisement in the 60s.

== Personal life ==
Rozina married the sound specialist, Riffat Qureshi and converted to Islam as Ayesha Qureshi. She has a daughter, Saima Qureshi, who is a model and actress. TV actor and producer Faysal Quraishi is her nephew.

== Retirement and later life ==
After leaving films in 2004, she devoted herself to her family. Her husband died on 21 September 1995, in Karachi. Lately, she has been inclined towards religion and doesn't like to talk about her film career. She performed a pilgrimage (Umrah) to Mecca along with her daughter in 2020. She now lives in Karachi.

== Filmography ==
=== Film ===
Year	Film	Language
1963	Hamen Bhi Jeenay Do	Urdu
1964	Chhoti Behan	Urdu
1965	Ishq-e-Habib	Urdu
1965	Chori Chhuppay	Urdu
1966	Azadi Ya Mout	Urdu
1966	Armaan	Urdu
1966	Akelay Na Jana	Urdu
1966	Josh	Urdu
1966	Dard-e-Dil	Urdu
1967	Ehsaan	Urdu
1967	Fantoosh	Urdu
1967	Meray Bachay Meri Ankhen	Urdu
1967	Ustadon Ka Ustad	Urdu
1967	Moyur Ponkhi	Bengali
1968	Doosri Maan	Urdu
1968	NaKhuda	Urdu
1968	Alf Leila	Urdu
1968	Samundar	Urdu
1968	Doosri Shadi	Urdu
1968	Beti Beta	Urdu
1968	Manzil Door Nahin	Urdu
1968	Sangdil	Urdu
1969	Baharen Phir Bhi Ayen Gi	Urdu
1969	Ishara	Urdu
1969	Tumhi Ho Mehboob Meray	Urdu
1969	Aasra	Urdu
1969	Aneela	Urdu
1969	Jaisay Jantay Nahin	Urdu
1969	Asslam-o-Alaikum	Urdu
1969	Pyar Ki Jeet	Urdu
1969	Qasm Us Waqt Ki	Urdu
1969	Saza	Urdu
1970	Love in Europe	Urdu
1970	Afsana	Urdu
1970	Kirdar	Urdu
1970	Mujrim Kon	Urdu
1970	Parai Beti	Urdu
1970	Honeymoon	Urdu
1970	BeQasoor	Urdu
1970	Mr. 420	Urdu
1970	Najma	Urdu
1970	Pardesi	Punjabi
1970	Phir Chand Niklay Ga	Urdu
1970	Soughat	Urdu
1970	Chand Suraj	Urdu
1971	Khamosh Nigahen	Urdu
1971	Waris	Punjabi
1971	Jaltay Suraj Ke Neechay	Urdu
1971	Rim Jhim	
1971	Gharnata	
1972	Japani Guddi	Punjabi
1972	2 Pattar Anaran Day	Punjabi
1972	Ucha Shamla Jatt Da	Punjabi
1972	Doulat Aur Duniya	Urdu
1972	Aao Pyar Karen	Urdu
1972	Basheera	Punjabi
1972	Sajjan Dushman	Punjabi
1972	Heera	Punjabi
1972	Sir Dhar Di Bazi	Punjabi
1972	Thhaah	Punjabi
1973	Zarq Khan	Urdu
1973	Professor	Urdu
1973	Sadhu Aur Sheitan	Urdu
1973	Ghairat Da Nishan	Punjabi
1973	Dukh Sajna Day	Punjabi
1973	Azmat	Urdu
1973	Insan Aur Gadha	Urdu
1973	Khoon Da Badla Khoon	Punjabi
1973	Nishan	Punjabi
1973	Sohna Babul	Punjabi
1973	Khabardar	Punjabi
1973	Dukh Sajna Day	Punjabi
1974	Usay Dekha Usay Chaha	Urdu
1974	Sikandra	Punjabi
1974	Budha Sher	Punjabi
1974	Allah Meri Touba	Urdu
1974	Rangi	Punjabi
1975	Mardan Hath Medan	Punjabi
1975	Haku	Punjabi
1975	Ustad	Punjabi
1975	Ashiq Lok Soudai	Punjabi
1975	Babul Daku	Punjabi
1976	Sohni Mehinwal	Punjabi
1976	2 Dushman	Punjabi
1977	Dharti Lahu Mangdi	Punjabi
1977	Jasoos	Urdu
1977	Inteqam Di Agg	Punjabi
1977	Ghairat Di Mout	Punjabi
1978	Lathi Charge	Punjabi
1978	Sheeshay Ka Ghar	Urdu
1978	Jashan	Punjabi
1978	Qayamat	Urdu
1985	Mashriq Maghrib	Urdu
1986	Ham Say Hay Zamana	Urdu
2004	Hum Ek Hain	Urdu

== Awards and recognition ==
Year	Award	Category	Result	Title	Ref.
1968	Nigar Award	Best Supporting Actress	Won	Ishara	
