= Rubina Badar =

Pakistani singer

- روبینہ بدر
- Born: Rubina Begum; 14 February 1956; Karachi, Sindh, Pakistan
- Died: 28 March 2006 (aged 50); Karachi, Sindh, Pakistan
- Other name: Robina Badr
- Occupation: Singer
- Years active: 1964–2006
- Children: 2

Rubina Badar (14 February 1956 – 28 March 2006) was a Pakistani radio, TV, and film singer. She is known for her TV song, "Tum Sung Nainan Laagay".

== Early life ==
Robina was born in 1956. She started her singing career from Radio Pakistan, Karachi. Then she came to Lahore to work as a playback singer in Lollywood.

== Career ==
She rendered her voice in films such as Rangeela aur Munawar Zarif, Parda Na Uthao, Imandar, Intezar, Sharafat, Khatarnak, Bahishat, Izzat, Arzoo, Khanzada, and others. She sang 48 songs in 42 Urdu and Punjabi films.

In 1973, Rubina got a breakthrough as a singer when she vocalized a song for PTV, Karachi, "Tum Sung Nainan Laagay". Penned by Asad Muhammad Khan and composed by Khalid Nizami, the song turned out to be a milestone in her music career. Her other movie songs like, "Yonhi Din Kat Jaye" (along with A. Nayyar for the film Bahaisht (1974)), "Rus Ke Tur Paye O Sarkaar" (for film: Khanzada (1975)), and "Jhoom Jhoom Nachay aayo" (along with Nahid Akhtar for the film Anari (1975)), also became popular.

== Illness and death ==
Rubina died at age 50 from cancer on March 28, 2006, in Karachi.

== Popular songs ==
=== Film ===
- Dada Jee, Apnay Potay Ko Samjhaen ... (1974 film: Parda Na Uthao - Urdu), Singer(s): Ahmad Rushdi, Robina Badar, Music: M. Ashraf
- Pak Watan Ki Dharti Pyari, Ham Ko Apni Jan Say Pyari ... (1974 film: Aaina Aur Soorat - Urdu), Singer(s): Ahmad Rushdi, Robina Badar, Music: M. Ashraf, Poet: Taslim Fazli
- Yuhni Din Cut Jayen, Yuhni Sham Dhal Jaye..1974 (1974 film: Bahisht - Urdu), Singer(s): Robina Badar, A. Nayyar, Music: A. Hameed, Poet: Taslim Fazli
- Piyar Ki Ek Nai Raah Pe 1974 (1974 film: Intezar - Urdu), Singer(s): Robina Badar, Music: Nisar Bazmi, Poet: Masroor Anwar
- Twinkle, Twinkle, Little Star, How I Wonder What You Are ... (1975 film: Ajj Di Gall - Punjabi), Singer(s): Masood Rana, Robina Badar, Music: Tasadduq Hussain, Poet: Asad Bukhari
- Jhoom Jhoom Nachay Aayo ... (1975 film: Anari - Urdu), Singer(s): Naheed Akhtar, Robina Badar, Music: M. Ashraf, Poet: Taslim Fazli
- Sathi Na Chhorun Daaman Tera, Yeh Hahy Mera Faisala ... (1975 film: Izzat - Urdu), Singer(s): Robina Badar, Ahmad Rushdi, Music: A. Hameed, Poet: Taslim Fazli
- Rus Kay Tur Peye O Sarkar, Tor Kay Mera Sajra Pyar ... (1975 film: Khanzada - Punjabi), Singer(s): Robina Badar, Music: Nazir Ali
- Jitnay Pyaray Ho Tum, Khoobsurat Ho Tum, Itna Pyara Dil Ho To. 1975 (Film: Shikwa - Urdu), Singer(s): Robina Badar, Music: Nashad, Poet: Taslim Fazli

=== TV ===
- Tum Sung Nainan Laagay ... Poet: Asad Muhammad Khan, Music: Khalid Nizami
- Aaj Bhi Intezaar Hai
