= Neend Hamari Khwab Tumhare =

Neend Hamari Khwab Tumhare (lit. 'I Sleep But You Dream') may refer to:

- Neend Hamari Khwab Tumhare (1966 film), an Indian Hindi-language romantic musical film by Shiv Sahni, starring Shashi Kapoor and Nanda
- Neend Hamari Khwab Tumhare (1971 film), a Pakistani Urdu-language film
