= Chotay Nawab =

Pakistani film

- چھوٹے نواب
- Directed by: Iqbal Akhtar
- Written by: Agha Hassan Imtisal
- Produced by: Begum Ahad Malik
- Starring: Babra Sharif; Shahid; Neelo; Waheed Murad; Bindiya
- Music by: Nazir Ali
- Distributed by: Gala Colour
- Release date: 14 March 1980
- Running time: 150 minutes
- Country: Pakistan
- Language: Urdu

Chotay Nawab (Urdu: چھوٹے نواب, lit. 'Little Viceroy') is a 1980 Pakistani film it written by Agha Hassan Imtisal and directed by Iqbal Akhtar it was produced by Begum Ahad Malik. It stars Babra Sharif, Shahid, Neelo, Waheed Murad and Bindiya in leading roles.

== Synopsis ==
Chotay Nawab Saleem Mirza (Shahid) is a pampered young man who spend his ancestral money on his friends to stay relevant the glory of Nawabs. Due to his brat nature, he lost his mansion to Saith Amjad. Later he begins to like his daughter Rabia (Babra) but she is not interested in him due to his childish nature. Jaani (Waheed) a close friend of Rabia begins to like her friend Najma (Neelo) meanwhile Rabia and Najma's wealthy friend (Bindiya) encourages them to married the man they like.

== Cast ==
- Babra Sharif as Rabia Begum
- Shahid as Chotay Nawab Saleem Mirza
- Neelo as Najma
- Waheed Murad as Jaani
- Bindiya as Natalia
- Mehboob Alam as Hanif
- Khalid Saleem Mota as Khalid
- Kamal Irani as Saith Amjad
- Saqi as Munshi Kamal
- Ibrahim Nafees as Nawab Hashmat
- Najma Mehboob as Najma's mother
- Masood Akhtar as Dr. Khan
- Mohammad Hanif Azad as Yousuf
- Shah Nawaz Ghumman as Fayyaz

== Music ==
All lyrics are written by Tasleem Fazli & Khawaja Pervaiz; all music is composed by Nazir Ali.

Chotay Nawab
No.	Title	Singer (s)	Length
1.	"Ghor Say Dekho Dunya Ko, Har Insan Kay Chehray 2"	Naheed Akhtar	5:30
2.	"Ham Sar Ko Jhukayen Gay Darr-e-Yaar Kay Aagay"	Rajab Ali & Masood Rana & Samar Iqbal	3:00
3.	"Jab Tak Yeh Dunya Rahay Gi, Tujhay Pyar Main Karti Rahun Gi"	Naheed Akhtar	2:30
4.	"Koi Na Dekhay Ham Ko Sanam"	Naheed Akhtar	3:45
5.	"La Day Ray Mohay Lal Chuniria"	Mehnaz Begum & Rajab Ali	4:00
6.	"Mil Geyi Pyar Ko Zindgani, Dil Diya Aap Nay Mehrbani"	A. Nayyar & Naheed Akhtar	3:00

== Reception ==
The film was released on 14 March 1980, and it was a Silver Jubilee hit at the box office.
