= Nazir Ali (musician) =

Pakistani film score composer (1945 - 2003)

- Born: 1945; Gakhar Mandi, Gujranwala district, British India
- Died: 5 January 2003 (aged 57–58); Lahore, Pakistan
- Occupations: Musician –: Film score; dhamaal
- Years active: 1961 – 2001
- Awards: 2 'Best Musician' Nigar Awards (1971) and (1972)

Nazir Ali (1945 – 5 January 2003) was a Pakistani film music director. He is widely considered as the "King of dhamaal" in Pakistan.

He composed 123 songs in 39 Urdu films and 435 songs in 115 Punjabi films. He won 2 Nigar Awards during his music career over three decades.

== Early life and career ==
Nazir Ali was born in Gakhar Mandi, Gujranwala district, British India in 1945. In 1961, he started his music career as an assistant musician for M. Ashraf, a musical duo. He also assisted musicians Bakhshi-Wazir and Tassaduq Hussain for some time. Finally, he gained a chance as a solo music director with the 1966 film Paidagir.

He got his first breakthrough as a musician from a film 'dhamaal', "Lal meri pat rakhiyo", recorded in the voice of Noor Jehan for the movie Dilan De Sauday (1969). His first Urdu movie, Aansoo, was released in 1971 and included several hit tracks like, "Teray Bin Yon Gharyian Beetein" (vocalized by Masood Rana / Noor Jehan), "Jan-e-Jan Tu Jo Kahay" (vocalized by Mehdi Hassan), and others. Afterwards, he became one the busiest music directors in Lollywood. Nazir composed 559 songs in 161 Urdu and Punjabi films. His last film, Gujjar 302, was released in 2001. Nazir Ali's prime was in the 1970s and the melodies he created have become part of the cultural heritage of Pakistan.

== Musical style ==
During the 1970s and the 1980s, Nazir popularized the Punjabi film music, leaving an indelible mark on it. He was the first music director to infuse a touch of sufi 'dhamaal' into conventional Punjabi tunes, resulting in a distinct style of music. In 1969, his collaboration with Noor Jehan began with the most famous dhamaal song, "Lal meri patt rakhio bhala jhole laalan" for the film Dilan De Sauday. In 14 Punjabi movies, they both created enchantment with dhamaal songs. It was reportedly said by the music critics of that time, "Nazir Ali was firmly grounded in the Punjabi ang."

== Popular compositions ==
Song title	Sung by	Lyrics by	Music by	Film notes
Lal Meri Patt Rakhio Bhala, Jhoolay Lalan De	Noor Jehan	Old traditional lyrics written by a Sufi poet Saghar Siddiqui to honor the 13th century Sufi saint Lal Shahbaz Qalandar	Nazir Ali	Dillan De Sauday (1969)
Bhul Jaan Ae Sab Gham Dunia De, Jinnun Pyar Karran Jay Oh Naal Hovay	Masood Rana	Hazin Qadri	Nazir Ali	Dillan De Sauday (1969)
Apna Bana Kay, Dil Laa Kay, Nass Jaain Na, Mere Haania	Noor Jehan	Hazin Qadri	Nazir Ali	Dillan De Sauday (1969)
Sahtoun Kahnun Pherrian Ne Akhian Wey Babua	Noor Jehan	Hazin Qadri	Nazir Ali	Genterman (1969)
Sayyo Ni Mera Mahi, Meray Bhag Jagawan Aa Geya	Noor Jehan	Hazin Qadri	Nazir Ali	Mastana Mahi (1971)
Wey Sab Taun Sohneya, Haaye Wey Mann Mohnya	Tasawar Khanum	Khawaja Pervaiz	Nazir Ali	Rangeela (1970)
Jaan-e-jaan Tu Jo Kahe, Gaaun Mein Geet Nayei	Mehdi Hassan	Tanvir Naqvi	Nazir Ali	Aansoo (1971)
Teray Bina Yun Gharian Beetin, Jaisay Sadiyan Beet Gein	Masood Rana	Khawaja Pervaiz	Nazir Ali	Aansoo (1971)
Sab Haseen Bewafa Hain Iss Zamaane Mein	Naseem Begum and other singers (Qawwali)	Tanvir Naqvi	Nazir Ali	Aansoo (1971)
Dildar Sadqay, Lakh War Sadqay, Tera Karm Hoya, Hoya Pyar Sadqay	Noor Jehan	Hazin Qadri	Nazir Ali	Sultan (1972)
Dhian Da Dhan Praaya Wey Babula	Noor Jehan	Hazin Qadri	Nazir Ali	Khan Chacha (1972). This was the first Diamond Jubilee Punjabi language film in Pakistan
Jinnan Teri Marzi Nacha Bailiya	Noor Jehan	Hazin Qadri	Nazir Ali	Khan Chacha (1972)
Pyaar Jo Hoya Naal Teray, Teray Wey Mahi Meray	Noor Jehan	Hazin Qadri	Nazir Ali	Jeera Blade (1973)
Ae Nagri Daata Di, Sajno Eithay Aanda Kul Zamana	Masood Rana and Noor Jehan		Nazir Ali	Nagri Daata Di (1974)
Mahia Jay Mein Kabootri Howaan	Noor Jehan	Hazin Qadri	Nazir Ali	Ishq Mera Naan (1974)
Punjaban Thaith Mahia	Noor Jehan	Hazin Qadri	Nazir Ali	Buddha Sher (1974)
Russ Kay Turr Paye O Sarkar, Torr Kay Mera Sajra Pyaar	Masood Rana and Rubina Badar	Khawaja Pervaiz	Nazir Ali	Khanzada (1975)
Sharbat Kay Badlay Pila Di Sharab, Tera Khana Kharab	Nahid Akhtar	Riaz ur Rehman Saghar	Nazir Ali	Aurat Eik Paheli (1976)
Kuchh Dair Tau Ruk Jaao Barsaat Kay Bahanay	Noor Jehan		Nazir Ali	Bara Aadmi (1981)
Mahi Aaway Ga Mein Phullan Naal Dharti Sajawan Gi	Noor Jehan	Khawaja Pervaiz	Nazir Ali	Qaidi (1986)

== Awards ==
Nazir Ali received the best musician Nigar Awards for the following films:

- Mastana Mahi (1971)
- Sultan (1972)

== Death ==
Nazir Ali died on 5 January 2003, in Lahore, Pakistan.
