= Roopmati Baaz Bahadur =

1960 film

- Urdu: روپ متی باز بہادُر
- Directed by: Zakaullah Shah
- Produced by: Syed Atiq
- Starring: Shamim Ara; Aslam Pervaiz
- Music by: Tassaduq Hussain
- Release date: 2 December 1960 (Pakistan)
- Country: Pakistan
- Languages: Urdu; Hindi

Roopmati Baaz Bahadur is a 1960 Pakistani romance film based on the story of Roopmati and Baz Bahadur.

It stars Shamim Ara and Aslam Pervaiz in the title roles. The film was directed by Zakaullah Shah, with music composed by Tassaduq Hussain for which he won the President Award for best music director.

The film also won President's Award for best singer for Roshan Ara Begum.

== Plot ==
The story revolves around the romance of a singer Roopmati with Baz Bahadur, who was the Sultan of Malwa but introduced himself as a soldier to her. After a few meetings with her, he manages to invite all the singers from the state to perform, so that he can spend time with her. When Roopmati gives her final performance, Thakur comes there and accuses her of killing his father while in reality he was accidentally killed when he was trying to humiliate Roopmati. Thakur is the same person whose father was the teacher of Roopmati and he himself wants to get her.

After his accusation, Sultan orders to imprison her.

== Cast ==
- Shamim Ara as Roopmati
- Aslam Pervaiz as Baz Bahadur
- Talish as Balbir Singh
- Saleem Raza as Thakur
- Saqi
- Naaz
- Rafi
- Anwar Majeed

== Soundtrack ==
All lyrics are written by Tufail Hoshiarpuri, Saifuddin Saif; all music is composed by Tassaduq Hussain

No.	Title	Lyrics	Singer (s)	Length
1.	"Meri Dastaan-e-Hasrat, Wo Suna Suna Ke Roye"	Saifuddin Saif	Kausar Parveen
2.	"Sun Le Pukar Aaj Mori"	Tufail Hoshiarpuri	Kausar Parveen
3.	"Prem, Rang Rang, Ang Ang Mein Samayo Re"	Tufail Hoshiarpuri	Kausar Parveen
4.	"Main To Piya Ki Bani Re Jogan"	Tufail Hoshiarpuri	Kausar Parveen
5.	"Tum Rakhiyo, Prabhu, Aaj Mori Laaj"	Tufail Hoshiarpuri	Roshan Ara Begum, Ghulam Hassan Shaggan

== Awards ==
The film won two awards at the President's Awards in the following year:

- Best Music Director - Tassaduq Hussain
- Best Singer - Roshan Ara Begum
