= Mera Ghar Meri Jannat =

1968 films

- Directed by: Hassan Tariq
- Screenplay by: Hassan Tariq
- Story by: Ali Sufiyan Afaqi
- Produced by: Hassan Tariq; Ali Sufiyan Afaqi
- Starring: Muhammad Ali; Shamim Ara; Rani; Meena Shorey; Ilyas Kashmiri; Saqi; Talish
- Music by: Manzoor Ashraf
- Production company: Filmsaz Productions
- Release date: 27 September 1968
- Running time: 180 minutes
- Country: Pakistan
- Language: Urdu

Mera Ghar Meri Jannat (transl. My house, My heaven) is a 1968 Pakistani film directed by Hassan Tariq, who also wrote the screenplay, based on a story by Ali Sufiyan Afaqi. It was co-produced by Tariq and Afaqi, and countrywide released on 27 September 1968.

The leading cast of the film includes Muhammad Ali, Shamim Ara and Rani.

At the annual Nigar Awards, it won two Special Awards for Rani and Baby Jugnu.

== Plot ==
The plot revolves around a middle-class man who is tired of his hard-working life. His wife often makes him realize that their house with a little kid is like a heaven for her, but he only craves for a rich lifestyle and wants to get wealthy. He gets this chance when a rich man, who looks like him commits suicide. He then proves himself to be dead, takes his place and starts living his life.

== Cast ==
- Muhammad Ali as Nasir/ Qaiser
- Shamim Ara as Najma/ Rozi
- Rani as Mona
- Master Murad as Sajid
- Babay Jugnu
- Meena Shorey
- Ilyas Kashmiri
- Kalavati
- Saqi
- Talish (guest appearance)

== Soundtrack ==
All music is composed by Manzoor Ashraf.

1. Aaja Pyar Ka Hay Zamana, Be-Rukhi Say Dil Na Jala.. – Mala
2. Bhula Bhi Day Usay Jo Baat Ho Gei Pyaray.. – Noor Jahan
3. Janay Kis Rah Peh Lay Aai Zindagi – Mala
4. Maa Keh Kar Kisay Bulaun, Mera Dunya Mein Koi Sahara Nahin – Mala
5. Main Nahin Dil Hay Tera, Tu Kabhi Ho Ga Na Mera – Masood Rana
6. Mehfil To Ajnabi Thi, Tum Bhi Huay Parayay – Mehdi Hassan
7. Na Milay Gi Khushi, Hay Yahi Zindagi – Mala
8. Thukra Diya Jin Ko Dunya Nay, Ab Kon Hay Un Ka Teray Siwa – Masood Rana, Mala

== Production ==
The film was directed by Hassan Tariq and written by Ali Sufiyan Afaqi. The film was originally titled Akela.

== Awards ==
Year	Award	Category	Awardee	Result	Ref.
1969	Nigar Awards	Special Award	Baby Jugnu	Won	
1969	Nigar Awards	Special Award	Rani	Won	
