= Aliya Begum =

Pakistani actress

Aliya
- عالیہ
- Born: Aliya Bano; 23 May 1948 (age 78); Lahore, Punjab, Pakistan
- Education: University of Lahore
- Occupation: Actress
- Years active: 1962 – present
- Spouse: Altaf Hussain (divorced)
- Children: 2
- Parent: Mumtaz Bano (mother)
- Relatives: Arshad Kazmi (step-father)

Aliya, also known as Aaliya (Punjabi, Urdu: عالیہ) is a Pakistani film actress. She acted in both Urdu and Punjabi films and is known for her roles in the films Andaleeb, Anhoni, Maula Jatt, Yeh Adam, Lado Rani and Neend Hamari Khwab Tumhare.

== Early life ==
Aliya was born on 23 May 1948 in Lahore, Pakistan.

== Career ==
She made her debut as a child actress in the 1962 film Unchay Mahal. Aliya's mother Mumtaz was a producer and she worked in her mother's films. She worked in Lollywood films and appeared in films Taxi Driver, Pagri Sanbhal Jatta, Neyi Laila Neya Majnu, Teray Ishq Nachaya, Aasoo Billa, Dara and Chann Veer.

Then she changed her name to Aaliya and later appeared in films Ghairat Tay Qanoon, Zulm Da Badla, Basheera, 2 Rangeelay, Ishq Deevana and Doulat Aur Dunya. Since then she has appeared in films Sher Khan, Daman Aur Chingari, Zarq Khan, Hashu Khan, Sajjan Kamla, Jeera Sain and Noukar Tay Malik.

In 1969, she starred in the film Nai Laila Naya Majnu with Syed Kamal, Lehri and Ilyas Kashmiri, the film was a hit and earned her Nigar Award for Best Supporting Actress.

In 1970, she played her first leading role in the adventure-drama Love in Jungle.

== Personal life ==
Aliya married film director Altaf Hussain. They divorced in 1979 and Aliya took the custody of both her children, a son and a daughter.

== Filmography ==
=== Film ===
| Year | Film | Language |
|---|---|---|
| 1962 | Unchay Mahal | Urdu |
| 1963 | Rishta | Punjabi |
| 1965 | Jhanjhar | Punjabi |
| 1965 | 1000 Dastan | Urdu |
| 1965 | Soukan | Punjabi |
| 1965 | Khota Paisa | Urdu |
| 1966 | Al-Hilal | Urdu |
| 1966 | Munhzor | Punjabi |
| 1966 | Tabedar | Punjabi |
| 1967 | Akbara | Punjabi |
| 1967 | Mirza Jatt | Punjabi |
| 1968 | Dara | Urdu |
| 1968 | Roti | Punjabi |
| 1968 | Taj Mahal (Pakistani film) | Urdu |
| 1968 | Pagri Sanbhal Jatta | Punjabi |
| 1968 | Behan Bhai | Urdu |
| 1969 | Daastan | Urdu |
| 1969 | Andaleeb | Urdu |
| 1969 | Chann Veer | Punjabi |
| 1969 | Najo | Punjabi |
| 1969 | Nai Laila Naya Majnu | Urdu |
| 1969 | Teray Ishq Nachaya | Punjabi |
| 1970 | Chann Sajna | Punjabi |
| 1970 | Bedardi | Urdu |
| 1970 | Gul Bakavli | Punjabi |
| 1970 | Taxi Driver | Punjabi |
| 1970 | Love in Jungle | Urdu |
| 1970 | Darinda | Urdu |
| 1971 | Neend Hamari Khwab Tumhare | Urdu |
| 1971 | Babul | Punjabi |
| 1971 | Aasoo Billa | Punjabi |
| 1971 | Wehshi | Urdu |
| 1971 | Mastana Mahi | Punjabi |
| 1971 | Ishq Deevana | Punjabi |
| 1971 | Tehzeeb | Urdu |
| 1972 | Khan Chacha | Punjabi |
| 1972 | Heera Moti | Punjabi |
| 1972 | Doulat Aur Dunya | Urdu |
| 1972 | Ghairat Tay Qanoon | Punjabi |
| 1972 | Eid Da Chann | Punajbi |
| 1972 | Basheera | Punjabi |
| 1972 | Zulm Da Badla | Punjabi |
| 1972 | Sohani Jani | Punjabi |
| 1972 | Nizam | Punjabi |
| 1972 | Sultan | Punjabi |
| 1972 | 2 Rangeelay | Punjabi |
| 1972 | Patola | Punjabi |
| 1972 | Inteqam | Punjabi |
| 1973 | Zarq Khan | Urdu |
| 1973 | Mera Khoon | Punjabi |
| 1973 | Daman Aur Chingari | Urdu |
| 1974 | Ishq Mera Naa | Punjabi |
| 1974 | Hashu Khan | Punjabi |
| 1975 | Rawal | Punjabi |
| 1975 | Jab Jab Phool Khile | Urdu |
| 1975 | Sajjan Kamla | Punjabi |
| 1976 | Sayyan Anari | Urdu |
| 1976 | Shagna Di Mehndi | Punjabi |
| 1976 | Zaib-un-Nisa | Urdu |
| 1977 | Danka | Punjabi |
| 1977 | Jeera Sain | Punjabi |
| 1978 | Cheeta Chalbaz | Punjabi |
| 1978 | Shera Daket | Punjabi |
| 1978 | Yaari Dosti | Punjabi |
| 1978 | Aabshar | Urdu |
| 1979 | Chalaan | Punjabi |
| 1979 | Jatt Da Kharak | Punjabi |
| 1979 | Maula Jatt | Punjabi |
| 1980 | The Blood of Hussain | English |
| 1981 | Jurm Tay Insaf | Punjabi |
| 1981 | Sher Khan | Punjabi |
| 1981 | Basheera Tay Qanoon | Punjabi |
| 1982 | Charda Suraj | Punjabi |
| 1982 | Noukar Tay Malik | Punjabi |
| 1982 | Wohti Da Sawal A | Punjabi |
| 1983 | Des Pardes | Punjabi |
| 1983 | 2 Ziddi | Punjabi |
| 1983 | Samundar Par | Punjabi |
| 1983 | Kala Samundar | Punjabi |
| 1983 | Mirza, Majnu, Ranjha | Punjabi |
| 1984 | Mela Tay Medan | Punjabi |
| 1984 | Ilaqa Incharge | Punjabi |
| 1984 | Andher Nagri | Punjabi |
| 1985 | Shikra | Punjabi |
| 1985 | Bau Jhalla | Punjabi |
| 1986 | Yeh Adam | Punjabi |
| 1987 | Doli Tay Hathkari | Punjabi |
| 1988 | Disco Deevaney | Urdu |
| 1988 | Tohfa | Punjabi |
| 1988 | Taqatwar | Punjabi |
| 1988 | Pyasi | Urdu |
| 1990 | Allah Waris | Punjabi |
| 1990 | Jailor | Punjabi |
| 2003 | Kala Gujjar | Punjabi |
| 2005 | Bhola Sunyara | Punjabi |
| 2010 | Lado Rani | Punjabi |

== Awards and recognition ==
| Year | Award | Category | Result | Title | Ref. |
|---|---|---|---|---|---|
| 1969 | Nigar Award | Best Supporting Actress | Won | Nai Laila Naya Majnu | |
| 1971 | Nigar Award | Special Award | Won | Mastana Mahi | |
| 1972 | Nigar Award | Best Actress | Won | Zulam Da Badla | |
