= Love in Jungle =

- Directed by: Akku
- Screenplay by: Fayyaz Hashmi
- Produced by: Rehan Ayub
- Starring: Aliya; Azeem; Nanha; Adeeb; Gul Hameed; Rehana; Niggo
- Music by: Tassaduq Hussain
- Production company: Traders 69
- Release date: 10 June 1970
- Country: Pakistan
- Language: Urdu

Love in Jungle is a Pakistani film released in 1970. Starring Aliya in her first leading role, she was co-starred by Azeem (in his first West-Pakistan film), Nanha, Adeeb and Gul Hameed. Gul Hameed made his debut in this film and played the role of a man who lives in a jungle with wild animals, much like Tarzan. The screenplay was written by Fayyaz Hashmi and music was composed by Tassaduq Hussain. It was the first film in the series of Love in. It celebrated its silver jubilee on the Box office.

Love in Jungle is the third of three films which were released in East Pakistan (present day Bangladesh) with Bengali-dubbed versions.

== Plot ==
In a war, many people run to save their lives from aerial shelling. Many of them die and the survivors flee into a nearby jungle. They encounter several problems in the jungle, including bloodthirsty and wild animals. They also encounter a wild man who lives and behaves like the animals, who saves them from the wild animals at one point. He kidnaps a girl from the survivors who then tricks him to save herself and escape from him.

== Cast ==
- Gul Hameed
- Aliya
- Azeem
- Nanha
- Adeeb
- Tarana
- Niggo
- Shahida
- Rehana
- Zeenat (guest)

== Production ==
The filming took place in the forests of Sundarbans.

It was the first film in the Love in series, followed by other films such as Love in Europe (1970), Love in Nepal (1987).

== Release and reception ==
Love in Jungle was released on 19 June 1970, in the cinemas of Lahore and Karachi. It was premiered in Karachi's Palaza cinema. It was dubbed in Bengali to release in the East Pakistan, and was the third of three films which were released in East Pakistan in dubbed versions.

The film celebrated its Silver jubilee in Karachi circuit.
