= Nisar Qadri =

Pakistani actor (1940 – 2023)

- نثار قادری
- Born: 1940; Bheen, Chakwal, Punjab, British India
- Died: 24 December 2023 (aged 82)
- Occupation: Actor
- Years active: 1966–2023
- Television: PTV
- Awards: Pride of Performance Award (2016)

Nisar Qadri (1940 – 24 December 2023) was a Pakistani radio, stage, and television actor. He was honoured with the Pride of Performance Award in 2016.

== Life and career ==
Qadri started his career in 1966 at Radio Pakistan, Rawalpindi. Later, he starred in numerous TV dramas, movies, and radio plays. In the TV play "Aik Haqeeqat Aik Afsana", his catchy phrase "Machis hogi aap ke paas?" (Would you happen to have a matchbox?) became viral.

Qadri suffered from facial palsy during the mid-2010s and was absent from the screen during this time. He died on 24 December 2023, at the age of 82. He was survived by his wife and their three children.

== Filmography ==
=== Television ===
- Aik Haqeeqat Aik Afsana (1979)
- Bahadur Ali (1980)
- Samundar (1983)
- Karawaan (1985)
- Waadi (1987)
- Seerhian (1988)
- Patt Jhar (1991)
- Guest House (1992)
- Khuwahish (1993)
- Nijaat (1993)
- Angar Wadi (1994)
- Ranjish (1996)
- Kot Kher Deen (1997)
- Comedy Theater (1999)
- Parchhayen (1999)
- Landa Bazar (2002)
- Achanak (2003)
- Izterab (2003)
- Babay (2003)
- Pooray Chand Ki Raat (2003)
- Aatish (2004)
- Khamosh (2004)
- Aadhi Dhoop (2005)
- Malangi (2006)
- Afsar Be Kaar-e- Khas (2011)

=== Film ===
- Khamosh Pani (2003)
- Hum Ek Hain (2004)

== Awards ==
Year	Award	Category	Result	Ref.
2016	Pride of Performance Award	Arts	Won	
