= Lado Rani =

2010 film

- Directed by: Masood Butt
- Written by: Mohammad Kemal Pasha
- Produced by: Shahid Malik
- Starring: Shaan Shahid; Sila Hussain; Moammar Rana; Nargis; Aliya Begum; Mustafa Qureshi; Raheela Agha
- Cinematography: Masood Butt
- Music by: Wajahat Attre
- Release date: September 2010
- Country: Pakistan
- Language: Punjabi

Lado Radi is a 2010 Pakistani Punjabi film directed by Masood Butt, starring Shaan Shahid and actress Sila Hussain.

This film did an average amount of business at the box office. Film director Masood Butt has turned out some blockbuster Punjabi movies in the past for example Badmash Gujjar in 2001 but was not as lucky this time.

== Cast ==
- Shaan Shahid
- Nargis
- Moammar Rana
- Mustafa Qureshi
- Aliya Begum
