= Hum Ek Hain (2004 film) =

2004 film

- Directed by: Syed Noor
- Starring: Shaan; Saima; Shamyl Khan; Saima Qureshi; Haider Sultan; Iftikhar Thakur; Rozina; Nisar Qadri; Naghma; Shamyl Khan
- Music by: M. Arshad
- Release date: 26 June 2004
- Country: Pakistan
- Language: Urdu

Hum Ek Hain (transl. We are one) is a Pakistani Urdu film directed by Syed Noor which was released in theaters across Pakistan in November 2004. It stars Shaan, Saima, Shamyl Khan and Haidar Sultan.

== Plot ==
Hum Eik Hain begins with an Aaan showing Badshahi Mosque and other parts of Lahore with rather badly photographed (and badly lit) clips. The titles end on Mustafa who is the muezzin. He is educated, wears jeans and is looking for a job. However, he can't get a job even with repeated interviews. The academic degrees are not even worth good enough to be sold as waste paper. Trash must go to trash and the degrees are burnt alive in a rage of disappointment and frustration. There seems to be plenty of fire around at nights around Lahore with flames burning inside large empty drums (read 'a heavy symbolism of hero's agony').

Shan's mother is very religious and dresses like a nun in white. She helps children with Quran lessons and baptizes babies by marking '786' on their foreheads (it is supposed to be a good omen). Coming back to fire in the streets, Shan watches a Maulana being gunned down in cold blood. He is a witness and must suffer at the hands of the police and the establishment.

Shan joins Nisar Qadri's gang, delivering bags (containing bombs) from one place of the town to other and is instrumental in inadvertently killing his mother who happens to be traveling in one such bus to be blown up on Nisar Qadri's command. Shan is strictly not allowed to see inside the bag and find out what deadly explosives he has been carrying and delivering. It is time for him to change his loyalties, which he quickly does.

He builds up a gang of his own, who wear red bandanas with '786' emblazoned on them. The villains must be paid in their own currency and the scores are settled on the occasion of Ashura when crowds are purifying their sins from events of Karbala. A van carrying explosives by Haider Sultan is diverted minutes before but blood baths are choreographed simultaneously in the nearby deserted streets. The man behind these deadly schemes, Nisar Qadri, is butchered in his decorative temple, right across the street from Badshahi Mosque.

== Cast ==
- Shaan
- Saima
- Shamyl Khan
- Saima Qureshi as Bilqis
- Iftikhar Thakur
- Rozina
- Haider Sultan
- Nisar Qadri
- Naghma
