= Niggo =

Pakistan dancer and film actress

- Born: Nargis Begum
- Died: 5 January 1972; Lahore
- Cause of death: Murdered
- Occupations: Actress, dancer
- Years active: 1964–1972

Niggo (died 5 January 1972) was a popular traditional Pakistani dancer and film actor. She mainly worked in Punjabi and Urdu films in the 1960s.

== Early life ==
Niggo was born in Lahore, Pakistan. At that time, women from Lahore were often the first choice of Pakistani filmmakers. Those who were good at dancing joined the film industry. Niggo's mother was also a dancer in Lahore who made a living by performing Mujra, a traditional Indian dance. Niggo inherited her mother's profession and performed as a dancer.

== Career ==
Niggo had good dancing skills, and once the film producers came to heeramandi to select actresses, her dance performance caught their attention. It was common for the girls to join Lollywood and become famous actresses. Niggo's career in the film industry started the same way.

Because of her exceptional dancing skills, she was usually an optimal choice for the Mujra dance role in films. Her first film Ishrat was released in 1964. Niggo performed in almost a hundred movies altogether. She was the top item girl for most films.

== Personal life ==
While shooting for her film Qasu in 1972, Niggo fell in love with the film's producer Khawaja Mazhar. During this time, the couple got married. But Niggo's mother did not agree to their marriage, because marriage of tawaifs was always not recognized.

According to the old tradition, no girl can marry or travel without her family being compensated financially. Niggo's family tried to retrieve their daughter, but she refused to come back. To get her back home, Niggo's mother pretended to get sick and emotionally blackmailed her daughter to visit her one last time. Niggo visited her family, but was later brainwashed into staying. While her husband tried to convince Niggo to come back, Niggo due to her family's pressure, refused to return to her husband's home.

== Death ==
Niggo was killed at her residence on 5 January 1972, in Lahore. Her husband, after trying and failing to get her to return home, lost his temper, drove to Heera Mandi and opened fire on Niggo at her mother's house. Niggo's uncle and two musicians were also murdered in the incident.

Niggo's husband was sentenced to life imprisonment by the court in a public trial. The murderer died a natural death and was buried in his hometown of Gujranwala. Niggo was laid to rest at Miani Sahib Graveyard, Lahore.

== Filmography ==
- Ishrat (1964)
- Shahansha-e-Jahangir (1968)
- Nai Laila Naya Majnu (1969)
- Andaleeb (1969)
- Love in Jungle (1970)
- Afsana (1970)
- Mohabbat (1972)
