= Ali Sufiyan Afaqi =

Pakistani film producer-director, writer (1933–2015)

- Ali Sufiyan Afaqi
- Born: Ali Sufiyan; August 22, 1933; Sehore district, Bhopal, British India
- Died: January 27, 2015 (aged 81); Lahore, Pakistan
- Education: Bachelor of Arts
- Occupations: Journalist; Film producer; Director; Writer
- Years active: 1953 – 2015
- Era: 1958
- Awards: Won 8 Nigar Awards during his career

Ali Sufiyan Afaqi (22 August 1933 – 27 January 2015; sometimes spelled Sufyan Afaqi) was a Pakistani film producer, director, writer, and journalist. He made his debut in Lollywood films with his first ever Urdu film Thandi Sarak in 1957, and later contributed to other films as a writer and director, however he earned recognition as a film producer. He wrote about twenty-eight books on travel documentary and biographies, including Filmi Alif Laila, a book on the history of Pakistani cinema.

== Early life ==
Ali Sufiyan Afaqi was born on 22 August 1933 as Ali Sufiyan in British India (in modern-day Sehore district of Bhopal, India). Following the Partition of India in 1947, he along with his family migrated to Pakistan and settled in Lahore. At the time of migration, he was fourteen. In 1951, he obtained a BA degree.

In 1951, he worked for an insurance company, and later joined newspapers where he used to write columns on various subjects. He first joined Daily Tasneem and Jamaat-e-Islami. He also worked at Chattan, a weekly newspaper established by Agha Shorish Kashmiri, and later worked at the Nawa-i-waqt Group. In later years, he joined Daily Afaq newspaper where he choose his last name "Afaq" and became known as Ali Sufiyan Afaqi. He wrote first-ever film review in Afaq newspaper and then chose it as a regular job. As an editor, he worked at Aqwam weekly and as joint editor at Daily Aasar. Following the 1958 Pakistani coup d'état, he left journalism and moved to film industry.

== Career ==
He first joined the Urdu cinema as a storywriter and later wrote dialogues for Aadmi and Ayyaz films. In 1965, he worked as a producer of Kaneez film. Prior to his association as a producer, he first worked in Thandi Sarak film as a storywriter. As a storywriter, producer and director, he produced Urdu language films such as Joker, Aaj Kal, Aasra Aik Hi Rasta and Shikwa among others. During a film festival held in Russia by the Tashkent International Film Festival selected his films such as Aas, Saiqa and Ajnabi and translated them into Russian language.

== Filmography ==
Key
†	Remarks denote a short description of the work where available.

#	Title	Year	Director	Producer	Screenwriter	Notes
1	Thandi Sarak	1957			Yes	
2	Kaneez	1965		Yes	Yes	co-producer
3	Aaj Kal	1959			Yes	dialogues only
4	Joker	1966			Yes	dialogues only
5	Aik Hi Rasta	1968			Yes	
6	Mera Ghar Meri Jannat	1968		Yes	Yes	co-producer
7	Aasra	1969			Yes	dialogues only
8	Shikwa	1963			Yes	
9	Diwangi	1983			Yes	
10	Aar Par	1973			Yes	
11	Kabhi Alwida Nah Kehna	1983			Yes	
12	Andleeb	1969			Yes	dialogues only
13	Merey Hamsafar	1972			Yes	dialogues only
14	Gumnam	1983			Yes	dialogues only
15	Bandagi	1972			Yes	
16	Kamyabi	1984			Yes	dialogues only
17	Saiqa	1968			Yes	screenplay only
18	Play Boy	1978			Yes	
18	Miss Colombo	1984			Yes	
19	Daman Aur Chingari	1973			Yes	dialogues only
20	Devar Bhabi	1967			Yes	dialogues only
21	Dil Aik Aaina	1972			Yes	
22	Mohabbat	1972			Yes	screenplay only
23	Intizar	1974			Yes	
24	Insaniat	1976			Yes	
25	Dosti	1971			Yes	
26	Namak Haram	1974	Yes	Yes	Yes	
27	Beta	1994			Yes	
28	Moamla Garh Barh Hai	1996			Yes	
29	Very Good Duynia Very Bad Log	1998			Yes	
30	Aas	1973	Yes	Yes	Yes	co-producer

== Awards ==
He was the recipient of eight Nigar Awards, six Graduate Awards and one Musawar Award and one Kartak Award.

== Death ==
He was suffering from health complications over the past few years and died in Lahore, Pakistan on 27 January 2015 of cancer.

== Books ==
=== Autobiographical Works / Travelogues ===
- Safarnāmah e Āmarīkā (سفرنامۂ امریکہ; Travelogue of America) – A detailed Urdu travelogue chronicling his observations and experiences during travels in the United States.
- Zarā England Tak (ذرا انگلستان تک; Towards England) – A reflective travel narrative capturing cultural and social contrasts observed in the UK.
- Yūrop ka Koh-i-Qāf (یورپ کا کوہِ قاف; The Mountain of Qaf of Europe) – A metaphorical and travel-inspired account of his experiences in Europe.

=== Film-Related Works ===
- Filmi Alf Laylā (فلمی الف لیلیٰ; The Filmic One Thousand and One Nights) – A three-volume memoir and oral history of the Pakistani film industry.
- Neel Kināre (نیل کنارے; Banks of the Nile) – A memoir based on his travel to Egypt and reflections on cross-cultural film experiences.
- Tilismāt-e Farang (طلسماتِ فرنگ; Magic of Foreign Lands) – Observational essays and satirical notes on Western societies and their contrasts with South Asia.

=== Biographical and Cultural Sketches ===
- Chānd Chehre (چاند چہرے; Moon-Faced Stars) – Biographical sketches of legendary South Asian actresses like Meena Kumari and Rekha.
- Millat ka Pāsban: Muhammad Ali Jinnah (ملت کا پاسبان: محمد علی جناح; The Nation’s Guardian: Muhammad Ali Jinnah) – A respectful biographical account of Quaid-e-Azam Muhammad Ali Jinnah.
- Khawābon ki Sarzamīn (خوابوں کی سرزمین; Land of Dreams) – Essays reflecting on the cultural and artistic fabric of Pakistan.
