= Aas (film) =

Pakistani film

- آس
- Directed by: Ali Sufiyan Afaqi
- Screenplay by: Ali Sufiyan Afaqi
- Story by: Ali Sufiyan Afaqi
- Produced by: Rashid Javed, Ali Sufiyan Afaqi
- Starring: Shabnam; Muhammad Ali; Aqeel; Nanha; Saiqa; Qavi; Nirala; Najma Mehboob; Saqi
- Cinematography: Jafar Bukhari
- Edited by: Mubarak Ali
- Music by: Nisar Bazmi
- Production company: Filmfare Productions
- Release date: 10 August 1973
- Country: Pakistan
- Language: Urdu

Aas (Urdu: آس, lit. 'Hope') is a 1973 Pakistani Urdu romantic drama film directed by Ali Sufiyan Afaqi.

Aas won 8 Nigar Awards in different categories, including the 'Best Film'of the year. The film was also exhibited at the Tashkent International Film Festival in the Soviet Union in 1987.

== Cast ==
- Shabnam
- Muhammad Ali
- Aqeel
- Nanha
- Saiqa
- Qavi
- Nirala
- Meena Chaudhary
- Najma Mehboob
- Santosh Russell
- Saqi

== Music and soundtracks ==
The playback music was composed by Nisar Bazmi:

- Bol Ri, Guria Bol, Zara... Singer(s): Nayyara Noor, Poet: Masroor Anwar
- Ham Nay Dekhay Is Dunya Mein Kaisay Kaisy Niralay Log... Singer(s): Noor Jehan, Poet: Masroor Anwar
- Jaayie, Shouq Say Jaayie... Singer(s): Runa Laila, Poet: Masroor Anwar
- Koi Yun Bhi Roothta Hay, Mana Meri Khata Hay... Singer(s): Noor Jehan, Ahmad Rushdi, Poet: Masroor Anwar
- Lakh Nakhray Dikhao, Sar Jhukana Paray Ga... Singer(s): Noor Jehan, Poet: Masroor Anwar
- Meri Marzi, Main To Gaun Gi... Singer(s): Runa Laila, Poet: Tasleem Fazli

== Release and box office ==
Aas was released on 10 August 1973. This film won 8 Nigar Awards in 1973.

== Awards ==
Year	Award	Category	Awardee	Ref.
1973	Nigar Award	Best film		
1973	Nigar Award	Best actor	Muhammad Ali	
1973	Nigar Award	Best director	Ali Sufiyan Afaqi	
1973	Nigar Award	Best Script writer	Ali Sufiyan Afaqi	
1973	Nigar Award	Best Screenplay	Ali Sufiyan Afaqi	
1973	Nigar Award	Best Cinematographer	Jafar Bukhari	
1973	Nigar Award	Best Art Director	Islam Shahabi	
1973	Nigar Award	Best Sound Editor	Mubarak Ali	
