= Khamosh Nigahen (1971 film) =

Pakistani film

- خاموش نگاہیں
- Directed by: Jameel Akhtar
- Produced by: Sheikh Abdur Rasheed
- Starring: Waheed Murad; Rozina; Husna
- Music by: M. Ashraf
- Distributed by: Auriga Pictures
- Release date: 4 June 1971
- Running time: 150 minutes
- Country: Pakistan
- Language: Urdu

Khamosh Nigahen (Urdu: خاموش نگاہیں, lit. 'Silent Eyes') is a 1971 Pakistani film directed by Jameel Akhtar and produced by Sheikh Abdur Rashed. It stars Waheed Murad, Rozina and Husna in leading roles.

== Plot ==
A girl named Shamim is taking care of her younger brother Pervaiz after the death of their mother. She meets Khalid, and they begin to like each other, but he is engaged to his cousin Zari.

== Cast ==
- Waheed Murad as Khalid
- Rozina as Shamim
- Husna as Zari
- Zafar Masood as Pervaiz
- Tamanna as Shamim's mother
- Munawar Zarif as Munawar
- Abbas Nosha as Ali

== Production ==
Khamosh Nigahen was filmed in Lahore and Japan.

== Release and box office ==
Khamosh Nigahen was released on 4 June 1971 and did not do well at the box office.

== Music ==
All lyrics are written by Khawaja Pervaiz; all music is composed by M. Ashraf.

Khamosh Nigahen
No.	Title	Singer (s)	Length
1.	"Alif Say Achhi, Gaaf Say Gurya, Jeem Say Japani"	Ahmed Rushdi	4:00
2.	"Kabhi To Mango, Kabhi To Lay Lo"	Ahmed Rushdi	3:00
3.	"Lag Rahi Hay Aaj Mujhay Sari Fiza"	Ahmed Rushdi	3:25
4.	"Lakhon Haseen Hayn Mujhay Tum Kyun Pasand"	Ahmed Rushdi & Mala Begum	4:20
5.	"Meri Mehboob Haseena, Teri Chahat Hay Jeena"	Ahmed Rushdi	3:00
