= Khawaja Najmul Hassan =

Pakistani Director, and Trainer

Khawaja Najam ul Hasan
- خواجہ نجم الحسن
- Born: 4 October 1949 (age 76); Lahore, Punjab, Pakistan
- Occupation: Television Director/Trainer
- Years active: 1974 - present
- Known for: Moods and Melodies television show
- Awards: Pride of Performance Award by the President of Pakistan in 2005; PTV Award (Pakistan Television) in 1998

Khawaja Najam ul Hasan (Urdu:خواجہ نجم الحسن; born 4 October 1949) is a prominent television producer, director, trainer and one of the pioneers of television in Pakistan since television was first introduced in the country in 1964. He has been decorated with many awards including best TV producer for Moods and Melodies in Singapore and the Pride of Performance award by the President of Pakistan in 2005.

== Early life and education ==
He got his education from Cathedral School, Lahore, Government Islamia College, Civil Lines, Lahore and Government College, Lahore, Pakistan.

== Career ==
Khawaja Najmul Hassan joined Pakistan Television Corporation (PTV) in 1974. At that time, Aslam Azhar was the managing director of PTV, Lahore Centre. Khawaja's college friend Shoaib Hashmi introduced him to Aslam Azhar.

Later in his career, Khawaja Najmul Hassan served as the Director Programs and then General Manager of PTV Lahore Centre in 2003.

Muneeza Hashmi, who worked for a long time with Khawaja Najmul Hassan at PTV Lahore Center, stated that he was a responsible and trustworthy person. Many people at the event agreed that he was an inspirational figure for upcoming TV artists and discovered many talented stars and groomed them over the years.

Well-known Pakistani singer Tina Sani said at an event, "I owe a lot to Khawaja sb for making my career. We would feel protected and perform live with ease in his presence. He would not allow anything to go on air that could damage the career or image of the artist".

Khawaja Najmul Hassan helped promote the careers of and worked with many noted Pakistani artists including Malika Pukhraj, Roshan Ara Begum, Iqbal Bano, Mehdi Hassan, Farida Khanum, Abida Parveen, Musarrat Nazir and Nusrat Fateh Ali Khan.

== National & international awards received ==
- Awarded the President's Pride of Performance in the field of television production (2005)
- Awarded the President's Sitara-e-Isaar for programmes on the victims of the 2005 Earthquake (2005)
- Best Director Music - Duniya Meri Jawan Hai (2004)
- Best Musical - Chilman- Winner of South Asia TV Awards Singapore (1996)
- Best Director Music - PTV Silver Jubilee Award (1989)
- Best Director Music - Moods & Melodies at Raduga Film & Television Award for Folk, Moscow (1989)
- Best Director Music - Andaz-e-Bayan Aur (1981)
- Best Director Music - Noor Jehan's Taranum (1981)
- Best Director Music - Malika Pukhraj/Tahira-Syed Sur ka Safar (1982)
- Best Producer Music - Shadi Biyah Kay Geet - Musarrat Nazir (1986)

== Pakistani television (PTV) services ==
- Producer/ Director PTV Lahore (1974 - 1984)
- Program Trainer, PTV Academy Islamabad (1984 - 1994)
- Controller Programs, PTV headquarters (1994- 1998)
- Conceptualization and Execution of a New channel - PTV World (General Manager) (1998 - 2002)
- Conceptualization / Director of PTV'S night time show PTV Islamabad Raat Gaey (2005 Till Date 2023) (PTV Lahore)
- Director Programs (2004 - 2008)

== PTV Awards ==
- PTV Silver Jubilee Awards Liaquat Gymnasium Islamabad (1989)
- PTV Awards Ceremony Liaquat Gymnasium Islamabad (1998)
- PTV Awards Ceremony Liaquat Gymnasium Islamabad (2002)
- PTV Awards Ceremony Sports Stadium Karachi (2005)
- Mujhey Dil Sey Na Bhulana - Life time Achievement Awards to Film Star Shabnam/Composer Robin Ghosh at Governor House Lahore by Prime Minister Yousaf Raza Gillani (2012)
- PTV Awards at convention Centre Islamabad by Prime Minister Yousaf Raza Gillani (2013)

== Producer of PTV shows ==
- Taal Matol with Shoaib Hashmi (1975)
- Dastan Go (story tellers) (1977 - 1978)
- Tansen (docudrama on the classical music maestro Tansen)
- Sukhanwar (PTV musical TV show) (1974 - 1975)
- Saaz Kahani (story of dying musical instruments like Sarangi)
- Tarannum musical series with Noor Jehan (1981)
- Mauseeqar (tributes to Pakistani film music directors) (1983)
- Sur Ka Safar musical series with Malika Pukhraj and Tahira Syed
- Meri Pasand (musical TV series) (1982 - 1984)
- Traditional wedding songs series with Musarrat Nazir (1985)
- Moods and Melodies (PTV musical show) (1989)
- Chilman (traditional wedding songs with singers Saira Nasim, Shabnam Majeed, Tahira Syed, Arifa Siddiqui and Fariha Pervez) (1999)
- Khiraj-e-Tehseen (tributes to Pakistani legendary figures) (2006)
- Raat Gaye (PTV musical show) (2005-2006)

== Book launched ==
At a special event at Islamabad to launch a book about 'the golden era' of state-run Pakistan Television Corporation (PTV) in 2019, many prominent personalities gathered here from the broadcasting world including Fouzia Saeed, Uxi Mufti, Kanwal Naseer, Nayyar Kamal, Muneeza Hashmi and Laila Zuberi. This book is titled Stars from Another Sky – it is a story of over 35 years' journey in the broadcasting world of Khawaja Najmul Hassan who is widely considered to be a television star maker and producer of the most popular TV shows ever produced in Pakistan.

Noted Pakistani TV writer and playwright Haseena Moin has written the foreword of this book.
