= Andaleeb (film) =

1969 Pakistani film

- Directed by: Fareed Ahmed
- Written by: Salma Kanwal
- Produced by: Rashid Mukhtar
- Starring: Waheed Murad; Shabnam; Aliya; Mustafa Qureshi "Jugnu" Durdana Zareen; Ibrahim Nafees; Talish; Salma Mumtaz
- Music by: Nisar Bazmi
- Release date: 29 August 1969
- Running time: 180 minutes
- Country: Pakistan
- Language: Urdu

Andaleeb is a 1969 Pakistani Urdu colour film starring Waheed Murad, Shabnam, Aliya, and Mustafa Qureshi, and Talish. It was a golden jubilee hit directed by Farid Ahmed, produced by Rashid Mukhtar, and music composed by Nisar Bazmi. Andaleeb received 4 Nigar Awards in different categories.

== Plot ==
This film is a musical love story based on Salma Kanwal's novel by the same title, "Andaleeb".

== Cast ==
- Shabnam
- Waheed Murad
- Aliya Begum
- Mustafa Qureshi
- Talish
- Salma Mumtaz
- Lehri
- Talat Siddiqui
- Niggo
- Ibrahim Nafees
- Rajni
- Baby Durdana
- Atia Ashraf
- Meena Chaudhry
- Pandit Shahed
- Sultana Iqbal

== Music ==
The music of the film was composed by well-known musician Nisar Bazmi. The song Kuch log rooth kar be lagte hain kitne pyare written by Masroor Anwar was one of his big super-hit songs for 1969.

Songs of the film are:

- Nanhi munni guria rani... by Runa Laila
- Kuch log rooth kar bhi lagte hain kitne pyaare by Ahmad Rushdi
- Gaisuyon ke anchal mein... by Ahmad Rushdi
- Mere dil ki mehfil saja dene wale... by Ahmad Rushdi and Noor Jehan
- Tere waadon ne sanam... by Runa Laila
- Kuchh log rooth kar bhi... by Noor Jehan
- Pyar kar ke ham buhat pachhtaye... by Noor Jehan, film song written by Kaleem Usmani
- Jhoote waado se na dil behlaiye... by Runa Laila and Dina Laila

== Box office ==
The film was a golden jubilee hit, completing 56 weeks in theaters.

== Awards ==
Andaleeb won four Nigar Awards in the following categories:

Category	Recipient	Result
Best actor	Waheed Murad	Won
Special award	Shabnam	Won
Best screenplay	Ali Sufiyan Afaqi	Won
Best sound editor	A. Z. Baig	Won

== Trivia ==
Initially, the actress Shabnam was not able to speak Urdu fluently, so for Andaleeb, her dialogues were dubbed by a lady Kaukab Afzal.
