= Tassaduq Hussain =

Pakistani music director

- تصدق حسین
- Born: 1936; Lahore, Pakistan
- Died: 13 January 1982 (aged 45–46)
- Occupation: Film music director
- Years active: 1956 – 1980
- Awards: Pride of Performance Award by the President of Pakistan in 1960

Tassaduq Hussain (1936 – 13 January 1982) was a Pakistani film music director. He is known for composing playback music for the Lollywood movies Roopmati Baaz Bahadur (1960), Humrahi (1966), Zinda Laash (1967), and Nai Laila Naya Majnu (1969). He was honored with the Presidential Pride of Performance award in 1960.

== Early life and career ==
Tassaduq Hussain was born in Lahore, British India in 1936. He learned classical music from Ustad Salamat Ali Khan of Sham Chaurasia gharana. Tassaduq Hussain's debut film Chhoti Begum was released on 11 May 1956. It was a golden jubilee blockbuster. For Sabiha Khanum, he employed vocalist Kausar Parveen's voice.

He had a lucky year in 1957 as he scored two films, Daata and Nigaar. Saleem Raza's song "Kar Saari Khataein Muaaf Meri", became an instant hit in the earlier movie, which also starred Sabiha Khanum with Sudhir in the lead roles.

In 1958, Hussain scored two films: Naya Zamana and Naya Daur. The 1960 movies Bhabi and Shahzadi included music by him. For the movie Roopmati Baaz Bahadur, Hussain got the President Award for best music director in 1960. He composed the music for "Ghalib" and "Zameen Ka Chand" in 1961. Despite high expectations, Hussain's great score for the movie Ghalib failed to live up to the box office. With the exception of "Hei Bus Kei Har Ik Unke" which was recorded in a typical mujra style, the other ghazals were composed in a romantic way.

The 1962 movie Mera Kaya Qasur featured his compositions; "Aye Maa Tujhe Main Dhundun Kahan", "Choro Haath Baat Karo", "Main Ban Ke Dulhan Nachun", and "Meri Bhabhi Nahin Tu Meri Maa Hai". The songs "Sehra Mubarak Ho", and "Tera Kaun Yahan" were the result of Tasadduq Hussain's collaboration with Saleem Raza.

After composing the score for the 1966 musical picture Hamrahi, he gained considerable recognition. Masood Rana sang the soundtracks of the film and almost all became popular.

With the film Nai Laila Naya Majnu, Hussain stayed active from 1969 to 1972. He created some thrilling song sung by Ahmad Rushdi and Mala for the film. The other movies were Shabistan, Dastaan, Road To Swat, Naya Savera, Ali Baba Chalis Chor, Shahi Faqeer, Rabb Di Shaan, and Love in Jungle. His last movie Haseena Maan Jayegi was released in 1980.

== Death ==
After a seven-year hiatus, Hussain made his final movie. Then he died on 13 January 1982, not long after his final movie.

== Notable compositions ==
Hussain created music for 71 Urdu and Punjabi movies and composed around 408 songs:

Song title	Lyricist	Singer(s)	Film
Kab Tak Raho Ge Aakhir Yon Door Door Hum Se	Qateel Shafai	Kausar Parveen	Chhoti Begum (1956)
Mat Jaao Aaj Ki Raat Piya	Qateel Shifai	Kausar Parveen	Chhoti Begum (1956)
Kisay Maloom Thaa, Taqdeer Yeh Din Bhi Dikhaye Gi	Qateel Shifai	Kausar Parveen	Chhoti Begum (1956)
Kar Sari Khatayen Muaf Meri	Qateel Shafai	Saleem Raza	Daata (1957)
Mudat Hui Hai Yaar Ko Mehman Kiye Hue	Mirza Ghalib	Noor Jehan	Ghalib (1961)
Jiya Gayey Tara Ra Ra Rum, Gori Naache Chhanan Na Chhan, Taana Deray Taana Deray Na	Mushir Kazmi	Naheed Niazi	Aik Dil Do Diwane (1964) (original composition by Tassaduq Hussain). This song's catchy tune gained popularity in the 1980s, when Benjamin Sisters sang it on PTV's Silver Jubilee show hosted by Anwar Maqsood. Later, Musarrat Nazir added to its popularity by also singing it on Pakistani television.
Tumhi Ho Mehboob Mere	Khawaja Parvez	Masood Rana	Aina (1966)
Dil e Veeran Hai Teri Yaad Hai Tanhai Hai	Khawaja Pervaiz	Mehdi Hassan	Aina (1966)
Ho Gayi Zindgi Mujhe Piyari	Muzaffar Warsi	Masood Rana	Humrahi (1966)
Naqsha Teri Judai Ka	Muzaffar Warsi	Masood Rana	Humrahi (1966)
Yaad Karta Hai Zamana Unhi Insaano Ko	Muzaffar Warsi	Masood Rana	Humrahi (1966)
Aaj Khushi Se Jhoom Raha Hai	Professor Najmi	Ahmad Rushdi	Baghi Sardar (1966)
Dukhaye Dil Jo Kisi Ka	Muzaffar Warsi	Noor Jehan	Adalat (1968)
Qissa-e-Gham Mein Tera Naam Na Anay Den Gay	Fayyaz Hashmi	Mehdi Hassan	Dastaan (1969)
Sharir Kahin Kay Paas Aao Aa Bhi Jao	Fayyaz Hashmi	Irene Perveen	Dastaan (1969)
Nadiya Ke Beech Gori Halchal Machaye Re	Mauj Lakhnavi	Masood Rana, Mala	Nai Laila Naya Majnu (1969)
Haseena Dilruba	Mauj Lakhnavi	Ahmad Rushdi, Mala	Nai Laila Naya Majnu (1969)
Ye Ada Ye Naaz Ye Andaz Aap Ka	Mauj Lakhnavi	Ahmad Rushdi, Mala	Road To Swat (1970)

== Awards ==
Year	Award	Category	Result	Film	Ref.
1960	Presidential Award	Arts	Won	Roopmati Baaz Bahadur	
