= Daman Aur Chingari =

Pakistani romantic drama film

- دامن اور چنگاری
- Directed by: Shabab Kiranvi
- Screenplay by: Ali Sufiyan Afaqi
- Story by: Shabab Keranvi
- Produced by: A. Hameed
- Starring: Zeba; Muhammad Ali; Nadeem; Aliya; Munawar Zarif; Aslam Pervaiz; Allauddin
- Cinematography: Sadiq Moti
- Edited by: Ali
- Music by: M. Ashraf
- Production company: Shabab Productions
- Release date: 28 October 1973
- Country: Pakistan
- Language: Urdu

Daman Aur Chingari is a 1973 Pakistani Urdu romantic drama film directed by Shabab Kiranvi. The film included a heavy superstar cast including Zeba, Muhammad Ali, and Nadeem to depict a triangle love story. Other notable actors were Aliya, Munawar Zarif, Allauddin, and Aslam Pervaiz. Daman Aur Chingar won a Nigar Award in the best editor category.

== Cast ==
- Zeba
- Muhammad Ali
- Nadeem
- Aliya
- Munawar Zarif
- Aslam Pervaiz
- Allauddin
- Zarqa
- Farzana
- Seema
- Khalid Saleem Mota
- Meena Daud
- Chakram

== Release and box office ==
Daman Aur Chingari was released on 28 October 1973. The film was crowned as a golden jubilee hit by completing 63 weeks at theaters and received positive reviews in the press. It was re-screened at Lok Virsa on 4 February 2017.

== Music and soundtracks ==
The playback music of the film was composed by M. Ashraf:

- Asli Chehray Par Ham Nay Bhi Naqli Chehra Saja Liya... Singer(s): Noor Jehan, Poet: Masroor Anwar
- Bari Bari Ankhen, Meray Dil Ko Tarpayen... Singer(s): Ahmad Rushdi, Poet: Masroor Anwar
- Des Parayay Janay Waly Waada Kartay Jana... Singer(s): Noor Jahan, Poet: Shabab Kiranvi
- Ek Haath Peh Suraj Rakh Do, Eik Haath Peh Chand... Singer(s): Noor Jahan, Poet: Qateel Shafai
- Hamaray Dil Say Matt Khelo, Khilona Toot Jaye Ga... Singer(s): Mehdi Hassan, Poet: Taslim Fazli
- Meri Pyari Pyari Sahiba, Tera Mirza Arz Karay... Singer(s): Ahmad Rushdi, Tasawar Khanum, Poet: Masroor Anwar
- Saheli Tera Bankpan Lut Geya, Aina Tor Day... Singer(s): Noor Jahan, Poet: Qateel Shafai
- Yeh Waada Karo Keh Mohabbat Karen Gay... Singer(s): Masood Rana, Noor Jahan, Poet: Taslim Fazli
- Yeh Waada Kiya Tha, Mohabbat Karen Gay... Singer(s): Masood Rana, Poet: Shabab Keranvi

== Awards ==
Year	Film	Award	Category	Awardee	Ref.
1973	Daman Aur Chingari	Nigar Award	Best Film Editor	Ali	
