= Nirala =

Pakistani actor (1937 - 1990)

- Born: Syed Muzaffar Husain Zaidi; 8 August 1937; Uttar Pradesh province, British India
- Died: 9 December 1990 (aged 53); Karachi, Pakistan
- Occupation: film actor (comedian)
- Years active: 1960-1985

Nirala, real name Syed Muzaffar Husain Zaidi (Urdu: سيد مظفرحسین زيدي) (8 August 1937 – 9 December 1990), was a Pakistani comedian and film actor. He only appeared in Urdu films made in Pakistan. His first film was Aur bhi gham hain (1960). His last film was Choroan Ka Badshah, which was released in 1988. His most successful film was Armaan in 1966, in which he played a supporting role alongside Waheed Murad.

== Early life and acting career ==
He was born in Uttar Pradesh in British India on 8 August 1937. Nirala was raised in British India and then moved to Pakistan along with his family elders after the independence of Pakistan in 1947. They settled in Karachi in a rented house located at Abyssinia Lines (now known as Shahrah-e-Faisal Road).

Syed Muzaffar Husain Zaidi was known for his jokes and gimmicks since his early days. In the year 1959, he was invited to an entertainment program in Karachi. At that event, he entertained the public with his comedy. The audience was all praise for Muzaffar's one particular comedy, in which he acted as a professional pigeon caretaker. That caretaker's entire life revolves around pigeons.

A year later, Syed Muzaffar Husain Zaidi took the professional name Nirala and debuted in the 1960 film Aur Bhi Gham Hain, produced by Danish Dairwee, and directed by A.H. Siddiqui. In his debut movie, Nirala played the role of that same pigeon-lover, who was obsessed with pigeons. Nirala's interest was to create laughter, and he was highly successful at it.

Besides working in the movies, Nirala performed comedy routines at private parties, social events and stage shows around the country. In the 1970s, he married an Indian woman and had many children. He continued his profession as a comedian until his death in 1990.

== Filmography ==
- Aur Bhi Gham Hain (1960)
- Insan Badalta Hai (1961)
- Choti Behan (1964)
- Heera Aur Pathar (1964)
- Aisa Bhi Hota He (1965)
- Eid Mubarak (1965)
- Armaan (1966)
- Hum Dono (1966)
- Doraha (1967)
- Ehsaan (1967)
- Ustadon ke Ustad (1967)
- Jahan Tum Wahan Hum (1968)
- Assalam Alekum (1969)
- Ghar Damad (1969)
- Salgira (1969)
- Jhuk Gaya Aasman (1970)
- Mr 420 (1970)
- Naseeb Apna Apna (1970)
- Shama Parwana (1970)
- Eik Sapera (1971)
- Neend Hamari Khwab Tumhare (1971)
- Aas (1973)
- Shararat (1975)
- Mr. 420 (1992)

== Stage plays ==
- Bakra Qiston Per with comedian Umer Sharif

== Death ==
In the 1980s, Nirala moved to Karachi and made stage appearances with comedian Umer Sharif. He was fond of chewing beetle leaf. Excessive use of beetle leaf took its toll on his health, which deteriorated with the passage of time. He died on 9 December 1990, in Karachi.

== Awards ==
- Nigar Award for Best Comedian for the film, Armaan (1966 film).

== See also ==
- List of Lollywood actors
