= Jahan Tum Wahan Hum =

1968 film

- Directed by: Pervaiz Malik
- Starring: Waheed Murad; Shabnam; Nirala; Saiqa; Tamanna; Mehmood Ali; Badar Munir
- Music by: Robin Ghosh
- Release date: 1 November 1968
- Running time: approx. 3 hours
- Country: Pakistan
- Language: Urdu

Jahan Tum Wahan Hum is a 1968 Pakistani Urdu black-and-white film directed by Pervaiz Malik. It cast Waheed Murad, Shabnam, Nirala, Saiqa, Rukhsana, Tamanna and Mehmood Ali.

== Cast ==
- Shabnam
- Waheed Murad
- Nirala
- Saiqa
- Asifa
- Tamanna
- Neelofar
- Latif Charlie
- S.M. Saleem
- Azad
- Agha Sarwar

== Release ==
Jahan Tum Wahan Huum was released on 1 November 1968 in Pakistani cinemas.

== Music ==
The music of the film is composed by Robin Ghosh and the songs are written by Masroor Anwar. Playback singers are Ahmad Rushdi and Mala.

A list of film songs is as follows:

- Mujhe talash thi jis ki... by Ahmed Rushdi and Mala
- Usey dekha usey chaha... by Ahmed Rushdi
- Aye mere dil deewane... by Ahmed Rushdi
- Husn dekha jo tumhara to khuda yaad aya... by Ahmed Rushdi
