= Shabnam Majeed =

Pakistani singer

- Born: Rawalpindi, Pakistan
- Occupations: TV and film playback singing
- Years active: 1993–present
- Spouse: Wajid Ali (Shabnam is separated from her spouse) as of 2020
- Awards: PTV Award for Best Singer for the music video 'Anarkali' in 2006

Shabnam Majeed is a Pakistani film and TV playback singer.

== Personal life ==
Shabnam Majeed has four children with her former husband Wajid Ali, a music director. Their son, Naqi Ali (Lucky Ali), died at age seven after falling down the stairs in 2010. She filed for khula (divorce initiated by wife through a court of law) in February 2020.

Shabnam Majeed reportedly gave this reason for separation from her husband:

"I am upset over the fact that my husband is in contact with his ex-wife. Their pictures together have also gone viral. I am mentally drained and it is difficult for me to live with my husband anymore".

Majeed's brother, Abdul Waheed, was shot dead on 18 November 2020. 12 days later, two arrests were made in connection with the murder investigation. According to police accounts, Abdul Waheed was killed by his brother-in-law and an accomplice.

== Career ==
Shabnam Majeed started learning music at the age of 7. Shabnam first gained some fame in Pakistan through her remix of the single Dil Cheez Hai Kya. She has been described as 'one of the most prolific playback singers of Lollywood' by a major English language newspaper, The Express Tribune.

Shabnam Majeed complained to a major newspaper of Pakistan in 2016 that a new breed of film directors, producers had recently entered the Pakistani film industry. She thought that they were neglecting the established film playback singers of Pakistan. Instead, they preferred to hire Indian film playback singers for their films.

== Philanthropy ==
In 2016, Majeed, in collaboration with Alhamra Arts Council, formed an organisation to teach music to street children. The organisation, called the Lucky Ali Foundation, is named after her late son. She has also formed a charity dedicated to children with drug addiction.

== Awards ==
- PTV Award for Best Singer for the music video 'Anarkali' in 2006.
