= Naheed Akhtar =

Pakistani playback singer

- ناہید اختر
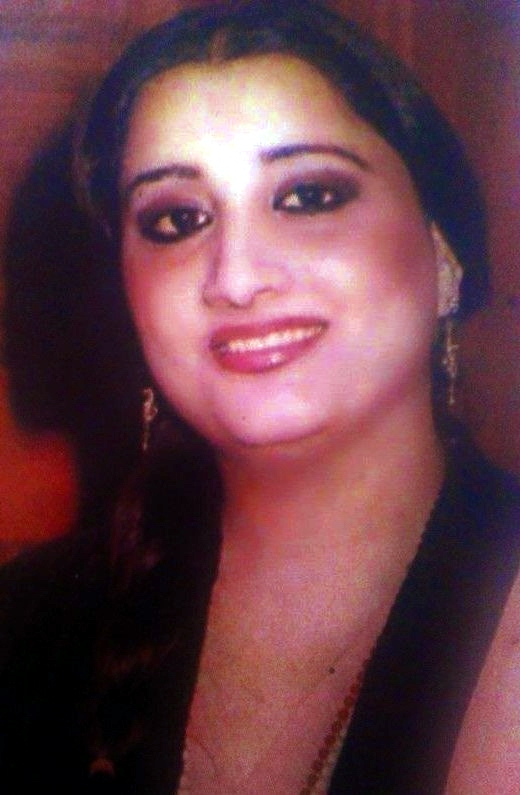
- Born: 26 September 1956 (age 69); Multan, Punjab, Pakistan
- Occupation: Singer
- Years active: 1970–1992
- Awards: 3 Nigar Film Awards for Best Singer
- Honours: Pride of Performance (2007)
- Musical career
- Genres: Playback singing, Ghazal
- Labels: Lollywood; PTV; Radio Pakistan
- Formerly of: Nisar Bazmi; M. Ashraf; Ustad Tafu

Naheed Akhtar (also spelled Nahid Akhtar; born 26 September 1956) is a Pakistani playback singer. She is tagged as the "Nightingale of Pakistan". She was the top Lollywood playback singer during the second half of the 1970s and 80s. She is one of the most popular and successful singers of Pakistan. She won 3 Nigar Awards and a Pride of Performance in 2007.

== Early life and family ==
Naheed was born on 26 September 1956, in Multan, Punjab. She has 3 sisters and 4 brothers. One of her sisters, Hamida Akhtar, was also a singer.

== Singing career ==
Naheed's career began in 1970 when she sang a duet with Khalid Asghar in "Raag Malhar" at Radio Pakistan Multan. She has recorded songs in a range of styles, including Pakistani film music, pop, Ghazal, traditional Pakistani classical music, Punjabi folk songs, Qawwalis, Naat & Hamds and others. She was first discovered for films in the mid-1970s by veteran music director M. Ashraf who pursued her to sing in films. She had no well-known person as ustad (teacher) to train her musically but music director M. Ashraf played a key role in grooming her talent. Her inaugural film "Nanha Farishta" was released in 1974 and in the same year she sang songs in the film Shama. Initially it was said in the film circles that she was introduced to fill the vacuum of Runa Laila who had migrated to Bangladesh. But later people recognized the originality of her singing style. She was active in the Pakistani film industry all the way through the 1980s.
As a playback singer, Naheed has given her voice to 590 songs in 436 Urdu and Punjabi films.

== Personal life ==
Naheed left singing in 1986. She married journalist Asif Ali Pota in 1994. They had a daughter and a son together. Pota died of cardiac arrest in 2017.

== Later appearances ==
Naheed Akhtar made an appearance on stage in 2013, after repeated requests of the management of a TV show, where active and popular singers like Shabnam Majeed, Humaira Channa, Humaira Arshad, Fariha Pervez, Saira Naseem, A. Nayyar, Hamid Ali Khan and Saima Jehan sang her songs to pay tribute to her. She stays busy with her family and children, and as of 2016, is not actively pursuing a singing career.

== Popular songs ==
A list of Naheed's popular songs includes:

=== Film ===
Song	Year	Film	Music composer	Poet	Notes
Dil Deewana Dil Na Jane Kyun Dharakta Rehta Hai.	1974	Nanha Farishta	M. Ashraf	Kaleem Usmani	
Kisi Mehrban Nay Aa Kay Meri Zindagi Saja Di	1974	Shama	M. Ashraf	Tasleem Fazli	
Lal Lal Honto Peh, Piya Tera Naam Hay	1975	Dil Nasheen	M. Ashraf	Masroor Anwar	
Main Ho Gei Dildar Ki, Honay Lagi Chubban Pyar Ki	1975	Teray Meray Sapnay	Kamal Ahmed	Younis Hamdam	
Allah Hi Allah Kia Karo Dukh Na Kisi Ko Dia Karo	1975	Pehchan	Nisar Bazmi	Masroor Anwar	
Tut Turo Tara Tara	1975	Mohabbat Zindagi Hai	M. Ashraf	Masroor Anwar	
Likh Di Ham Nay, Aaj Ki Sham, Aap Ki Khatir, Aap Kay Naam	1975	Neik Parveen	A. Hameed	Riaz ur Rehman Saghar	
Yeh Dunya Rahay Na Rahay Meray Hamdam	1975	Mera Naam Hay Mohabbat	M. Ashraf	Tasleem Fazli	co-singer with Mehdi Hassan
Dekha Jo Mera Jalwa To Dil Tham Lo Gay	1976	Talash	Nisar Bazmi	Masroor Anwar	
Bijli Bhari Hay Meray Ang Ang Mein	1976	Koshish	M. Ashraf		
Pyar To Ik Din Hona Tha, Hona Tha, Ho Geya	1976	Kharidar	M. Ashraf	Kaleem Usmani	co-singer with A. Nayyar
Teray Siva Dunya Mein Kuch Bhi Nahin	1976	Shabana	M. Ashraf	Tasleem Fazli	
Jis Tarf Ankhon Uthaun, Teri Tasvira Hay	1976	Surraya Bhopali	Nashad	Saifuddin Saif	co-singer with Mehdi Hassan
Sathi Mujay Mil Geya, Mil Geya Mil Geya, Rasmon Ko Toren Gay	1977	Jasoos	Tafu	Fayyaz Hashmi	
Baant Raha Tha Jab Khuda, Sare Jahan Ki Naimten	1978	Nazrana	M. Ashraf	Qateel Shafai	
Sahalie Ni Piar, Pyar Meinu Hoya	1985	Mehndi	Wajahat Attre	Khawaja Pervaiz	co-singer with Noor Jehan

=== Television ===
- Main Noo Soda Water Le De We Roz Baalma Kehndi (Folk music of Punjab)
- Shikar Dopehre Wangan Waala Aa Ni Gaya (Folk music of Punjab)
- Aap Sass Palange Lait Dee (Folk music)
- Sui We Sui Tanghi Saarhaane Meri Sass (Folk music)
- Pehron Aas Na Paas Hai Koi Aisi Bhi Kya Veerani Ho (Ghazal)
- Rut Rangeeli Aayi Kalli Kali Muskhayi (Pop music)
- Nazar Se Nazar Kya Mili Zindagi Mil Gayi Ajnabi Ajnabi (Pop music)
- Jaaneman Jaane Jaahan Bolo Na Kahan Ho Tum Bin Laage Sooni Sooni Shaam (Pop music)
- Kuch Din To Basoo Meri Aankhon Main Phir Khwaab Agar Ho Jaao To Kya (Ghazal)
- Aankhain Jhin Ko Dekhna Paayen Sapnon Mein Bikhra Dena (Ghazal)
- Kyoon Dekhoon Main Aur Kissi Ko Woh Hain Jab In Aankhon Main (Ghazal)
- Bohat Dinon Sey Mujhe Tera Intezar Hai Aa Jaa Aur Ab To Khaas Wahi (Ghazal)
- Aati Hai Pawan Jaati hai Pawan (Ghazal)
- Hamara Parcham Ye Piyara Parcham (National Song)
- Tujh Sey Hum Mansoob Hain Aise Aasman Se Taare Jaise (National Song)
- Jug Jug Jiye Mera Pyara Watan Lab Pe Dua Hai Dil Main Laagan (National Song)
- Zindagi Apni Watan Ki Zindagi Ka Naam Hai (National Song)
- Kabhi Bindiya Hanse Kabhi Nain Hanse Geet (song)
- Urtey Lamhon Ne Pehni Hai Dhanak Rang Ki Maala Geet (song)
- Ab Ke Saawan Bhichde Saathi Dil Ki Nagri Aana Waada Bhool Na Jaana Geet (song)
- Shabe Gham Mujh Se Mil Kar Aise Royi (Ghazal)
- Tumse Ulfat Ke Takaze Na Nibhaaye Jaate (Ghazal)
- Jahan Tera Naqsh e Qadam Dekhtay Hein (Ghazal)
- Chaap Tilak Sab Chheen Li Re Mosay Naina Milaaike (Sufi music)
- Mere Roothe Sanam Tujhe Meri Kasam Na Jaana Dil Thor Ke, Music Composer (Nisar Bazmi)
- Thak Gayi Hai Nazar Chale Aao Chale Aao Hogayi Hai Saahar Chale Aao
- Ghannan Ghannan Ghann Gaarje Baadarwa (Classical music)
- Kat Hi Gayi Judaai Bhi Kab Yeh Hua Ke Mar Gaye (Ghazal)

=== Radio ===
- Phir Chiraghe Lala Se Roshan Huye, (Kalam e Iqbal)
- Ik Kiran Muskhurati Huyi Ik Kiran
- Saawan Rut Main Tujhe Pukaaron Geet Milan Ke Geet (song)
- Jutti Kasuri Pehri Na Poori (Folk music of Punjab)
- Kaala Doriya Kunde Naal Ariya (Folk music of Punjab)
- Yeh Haadsaate Mohabbat Jahan Jahan Guzare (Ghazal)
- Kahiye To Kiya Sunaon Afsana Zindagi Ka (Ghazal)
- Saat Rangee Meri Odhani Ka Ek Ek Rang Nirala Geet (song)
- Sajna Noon Kadi Jhutaa Laara Nai Laai Da (Punjabi Music)

== Television programmes ==
Television Programmes List
Name	Produced By	Year
Lok Tamasha	Salahuddin Chaudhary And Azam Khurshid	1972
Sukhanwar	Akhtar Waqar Azeem	1972
Sangat	Rafiq Ahmed Warraich	1973
Yaadash Bakhair	Akhtar Waqar Azeem And Farrukh Bashir	1974
1st Colour Song	Rafiq Ahmed Warraich	1976
Sur Sangeet	Khawaja Najmul Hassan	1978
Sukhan Fahem	Muneeza Hashmi	1978
Mauseeqar	Khawaja Najmul Hassan	1979
Meena Bazar	Zaheer Khan	1979
Andaz Apna Apna	Khawaja Najmul Hassan	1979
PTV Awards	Ishrat Ansari	1980
Mehfil e Mauseeqi	Arif Rana - Kanwal Naseer	1980
Eid Show	Khawaja Najmul Hassan	1981
An Evening With Nahid Akhtar	Farrukh Bashir	1981
Eid Show	Khawaja Najmul Hassan And Farrukh Bashir	1982
Meri Pasand	Khawaja Najmul Hassan	1983
Sargam	Farrukh Bashir	1983
PTV Awards	Zaheer Khan	1984
Neelam Ghar	Ishrat Ansari	1984
Rim Jhim	Farrukh Bashir	1984
Jal Tarang	Farrukh Bashir	1984
Jhankar	Ayub Khawar	1985
Jashne Azadi Show	Farrukh Bashir	1985
Sur Bahaar	Farrukh Bashir	1986
Eid Show		1987
PTV Silver Jubilee Awards	Khawaja Najmul Hassan	1989
PTV Awards 1989 To 1997	Best Singer Award (Yeh Ranginiye Nau Bahaar)	1997
Top 10	Khawaja Najmul Hassan	2000

== Awards and honors ==
Awards and honors list
Award name	Category	Film	Year	Ref.
Nigar Film Awards	Best Singer	Shama	1974	
Nigar Film Awards	Best Singer	Pehchan	1975	
Nigar Film Awards	Best Singer	Humse Hai Zamana	1985	
Alami Urdu Conference New Delhi (India)	Best Ghazal Singer Award	New Delhi (India)	1988	
PTV Award	Best Singer	Sur Bahaar (Musical programme)	1997	
Melody Queen Noor Jehan Award	Music	PBC (Radio Pakistan)	2006	
Lux Style Awards	Lifetime Achievement Award	Mauritius	2007	
Pride of Performance Award	Arts	Islamabad	2007	
PTV Lifetime Achievement Award	Music	Islamabad	2010	
Kemal-e-Fun Medal	Music	Lifetime Achievement	2013	
