= Neend Hamari Khwab Tumhare (1971 film) =

1971 film

- Directed by: K. Khursheed
- Written by: Basheer Niaz
- Produced by: K. Khursheed
- Starring: Waheed Murad; Deeba; Nirala; Aliya Begum; Talish
- Cinematography: Sarwar Gul
- Music by: M Ashraf
- Release date: 1 January 1971
- Running time: 3 hours
- Country: Pakistan
- Language: Urdu

Neend Hamari Khwab Tumhare is a 1971 Pakistani Urdu colour film, produced and directed by Khalid Khursheed.

It was a musical romantic drama film with music by M Ashraf and lyrics by Kaleem Usmani. The story was written by Bashir Niaz based on a story idea by Mistry Ghulam Mohammad. Its cast included Waheed Murad, Deeba, Nirala, Aliya Begum and Talish.

== Cast ==
- Deeba
- Waheed Murad
- Aliya Begum
- Nirala
- Shahida
- A. Shah
- Zeenat
- Qavi
- Agha Talish

== Film Release ==
Neend Hamari Khwab Tumhare was released by K.K. Pictures on 1 January 1971 in Pakistani cinemas. In spite of worst political circumstances of the country due to the 1971 India-Pakistan War, the film did well in the cinemas. It completed 15 weeks in a main cinema and 51 weeks in other cinemas of Karachi and thus became a golden jubilee film.

== Film Music ==
The film has popular tracks "Mera Mehboob Aa Gaya" and "Naraaz Na Ho Toh Arz Karun" sung by Masood Rana. Music is composed by M Ashraf and the lyricist is Kaleem Usmani. Playback singers are Masood Rana, Runa Laila, Mehdi Hassan and Mala.

=== Songlist ===
#	Title	Singer
1	'"Yeh Duniya Hai Daulat Walon Ki"	Masood Rana
2	"Mera Mehboob Aa Gaya"	Masood Rana
3	"Naraaz Na Ho Toh Arz Karun"	Masood Rana
4	"Hum Ne Tau Piyar Buhat Tum Se Chhupana Chaha"	Masood Rana, Mala
5	"Haye Mera Jhumka"	Runa Laila
6	"Jo Bazahir Ajnabi Thay"	Mehdi Hassan
7	"Chup Chaap Rehna Kisise Na Kehna"	Runa Laila
