= Zaib-un-Nisa (film) =

Pakistani historical film

- Directed by: Fareed Ahmad
- Produced by: Mohammad Akram Chodhary
- Starring: Shamim Ara; Waheed Murad; Saleem Nasir; Aliya; Talish
- Music by: Inayat Hussain
- Production company: Noor Mahal Pictures
- Release date: 2 July 1976
- Country: Pakistan
- Language: Urdu

Zaib-un-Nisa is a 1976 Pakistani historical romance film directed by Fareed Ahmad. It stars Shamim Ara in the titular role, with Waheed Murad, Saleem Nasir, Aliya and Talish in pivotal roles. Set during the era of Indian rebellion of 1857, the film focuses on the anti-colonialist movement against the British Raj. It marked the debut of Nasir, who played the role of the last Mughal emperor Bahadur Shah Zafar. The music of the film was composed by Inayat Hussain. It was a box-office disaster.

The historical inaccuracies of the film are notable, particularly in its portrayal of Zeb-un-Nisa as the granddaughter of Bahadur Shah Zafar, when in fact, Zeb-un-Nisa was the daughter of Aurangzeb Alamgir.

== Plot ==
During the 1857 War of Independence, Bahadur Shah Zafar's granddaughter, Zeb-un-Nisa escapes from the palace and takes refuge in a royal physician's house. However, when the British army arrives, she escapes with the help of the physician's brother, Amjad Ali Khan, and takes shelter in a cleric's house. When the British government announces a reward for her capture, she leaves the cleric's house to save his life.

Meanwhile, Bahadur Shah Zafar is accused of treason against the British government and exiled. Zeb-un-Nisa appears in court, offering to surrender, but when she sees Amjad Ali as her lawyer, she requests his help discreetly. Amjad Ali takes her in as a governess for his young niece.

As time passes, Zeb-un-Nisa becomes a servant in Amjad's household. However, when Amjad sees her unveiled, he falls in love with her and tries to convince her to marry him. After some hesitation, Zeb-un-Nisa agrees, but Amjad's other love interest and British Commissioner Joseph's niece, Rita, is heartbroken when she discovers their relationship.

When Rita recognizes Zeb-un-Nisa from a file belonging to Joseph, she informs him of Zeb-un-Nisa's whereabouts. Joseph sends the police to arrest her, and Zeb-un-Nisa is accused of murdering a British officer. She is sentenced to death, but Amjad saves her by producing the officer alive in court, proving her innocence. Zeb-un-Nisa gets rescued, and it appears that Amjad and Zeb-un-Nisa's love prevails.

== Cast ==
- Shamim Ara as Zaib-un-Nisa
- Waheed Murad as Amjad Ali Khan
- Saleem Nasir as Bahadur Shah Zafar
- Aliya Begum as Rita
- Talish as Joseph
- Tamanna
- Sheikh Iqbal
- Munir Zarif
- Ghayyur Akhtar
- Irfan Khoosat

== Production ==
The development on the film began in 1971 along with Ahmed's another directorial Angarey.

== Reception ==
A reviewer from The Statesman found the film as a disappointment.
