= Shama (1974 film) =

1974 film

- شمع
- Directed by: Nazar Shabab
- Screenplay by: Riaz ur Rehman Saghar
- Story by: Shabab Kiranvi
- Produced by: A. Hameed
- Starring: Muhammad Ali; Deeba; Waheed Murad; Nadeem; Babra Sharif; Zeba
- Cinematography: Azhar Zaidi
- Music by: M. Ashraf
- Production company: Nazar Art Productions
- Release date: 25 December 1974
- Country: Pakistan
- Language: Urdu

Shama is a 1974 Pakistani Urdu romantic drama film directed by Nazar Shabab. The film had a multi-starrer cast with Muhammad Ali, Deeba, Waheed Murad, Nadeem, Babra Sharif, and Zeba in the lead roles.

It was a remake of Shabab Kiranvi's Mehtaab (1962). Shama won a Nigar Award in the best playback singer category.

== Cast ==
- Muhammad Ali
- Deeba
- Waheed Murad
- Nadeem
- Babra Sharif
- Tamanna
- Khalid Saleem Mota
- Saqi
- Chakram
- Akhtar Shad
- Neelufar
- Special appearances: Zeba, Farzana, and Allauddin

== Release and box office ==
Shama was released on 25 December 1974. It was a golden jubilee hit with 65 theatrical weeks.

== Music and soundtracks ==
Shama's playback music was composed by M. Ashraf and lyrics were penned by Tasleem Fazli:

- Aisay Mousam Mein Chup Kyun Ho... Singer(s): Nahid Akhtar
- Ho Meri Sanwli Saloni Mehbooba... Singer(s): Mehdi Hassan
- Kisi Mehrban Nay Aa Kay Meri Zindagi Saja Di... Singer(s): Naheed Akhtar
- Na Ghar Say Nikalna, Yun Zulfein Bakheray... Singer(s): Mehdi Hassan
- Yeh Tera Aana, Bheegi Raton Mein... Singer(s): Mehdi Hassan
- Zulmi Nay Haaey Chabo Di Sui... Singer(s): Rubina Badar

== Awards ==
Year	Film	Award	Category	Awardee	Ref.
1974	Shama	Nigar Award	Best Playback Singer	Nahid Akhtar	

== Trivia ==
A song from the film "Kisi Mehrban Ne Aakay Meri Zindgi Saja Di" was copied in the 1992 Indian film Kal Ki Awaz, sung by Asha Bhosle.
