= Shabana (film) =

1976 film

- Film poster of Shabana
- Directed by: Nazar Shabab
- Produced by: A. Hameed
- Starring: Babra Sharif; Waheed Murad; Shahid; Nanna; Tamanna; Masood Akhtar
- Music by: M. Ashraf
- Distributed by: Nazar Arts Productions
- Release date: 12 November 1976
- Running time: approx. 3 hours
- Country: Pakistan
- Language: Urdu

Shabana is a 1976 Pakistani Urdu language romantic drama film produced by A. Hameed and directed by Nazar Shabab. The film stars Babra Sharif, Waheed Murad and Shahid.

The film was released on 12 November 1976. The film completed more than 100 weeks at Pakistani cinemas and became a Diamond Jubilee film. The film gave a boost to Babra Sharif's career and she won her first Nigar award as a best actress.

== Plot ==
The story of the film revolves around two sisters; Shabana and Farzana (Babra Sharif in a double role). They are identical twins who have very different personalities. Farzana is a shy and innocent girl, whereas her sister, Shabana, has a lively and confident personality.

Farzana works as a secretary to the wealthy playboy, Akhter (Shahid). He lusts after Farzana, but is unable to seduce her. He finally manages to trap her by promising marriage. A secret marriage takes place between them, attended only by Akhter's closest aides and a dubious maulvi. After consummating the marriage, Akhter informs a stunned Farzana of his true intentions. When she refuses to leave quietly, he pushes her out of the apartment window in an attempt to kill her. However, she survives and when she returns home, her mother and Shabana are horrified to hear her story. Shabana decides to take revenge on Akhter for having deceived her now pregnant sister. Akhter is astonished and afraid when an apparently resurrected Farzana (who is really Shabana in disguise) returns to the office and resumes her duties as his secretary.

Meanwhile, Akhter's father passes away and his younger brother Anwar (Waheed Murad) returns home. Anwar finds Akhter behaving strangely. Shabana begins to blackmail Akhter about the attempted murder to ensure that he suffers for the cruelty he inflicted on her family. Anwar and Shabana fall in love and get married. Shabana moves into Akhter and Anwar's house and continues to harass Akhter. Anwar, unaware that his wife is actually Shabana not Farzana, overhears a conversation between his wife and elder brother and becomes despondent. The film ends with Akhter repenting his terrible actions and taking back Farzana and his child. Shabana and Anwar also reconcile.

== Cast ==
- Babra Sharif
- Waheed Murad
- Shahid
- Nanha
- Tamanna
- Masood Akhtar
- Nazam
- Zarqa
- Parveen Boby
- Seema
- Kamal Irani
- Chakram
- Saqi
- Murid Ahmad

== Release and reception ==
Shabana was released by Nazar Arts Productions at Pakistani cinemas on 12 November 1976. The film ran continuously 38 weeks at main cinemas and 101 other cinemas in Karachi. The film created a history when it became the first Pakistani film to cross the double 'Diamond Jubilee' barrier i.e. a 200-week theatrical run all over Pakistan.

== Soundtrack ==
The music and the songs, especially Tere siva dunya mein... and Jo dard mila, apno se mila... of the film became very popular. The music is composed by M Ashraf and the songs are written by Taslim Fazli.

- Jo Dard Mila, Apnon Sey Mila... by Mehdi Hassan
- Bewafa Kaun Hai, Kaun Harjai Hai... by Mehdi Hassan
- Yeh Tera Nazuk Badan Hai, Ya Koi Mehka Ghulab... by Mehdi Hassan
- Tere Siwa Dunia Mein Kuchh Bhi Nahin... by Mehdi Hassan
- Tere Siwa Dunia Mein Kuchh Bhi Nahin... by Naheed Akhtar

== Awards ==
Shabana won 5 Nigar film awards for 1976. They are listed as below:

Category	Awardee
Best actor	Shahid
Best actress	Babra Sharif
Best musician	M Ashraf
Best film songs lyricist	Taslim Fazli
Best Male Singer	Mehdi Hassan
