= Masood Rana =

Pakistani singer (1938–1995)

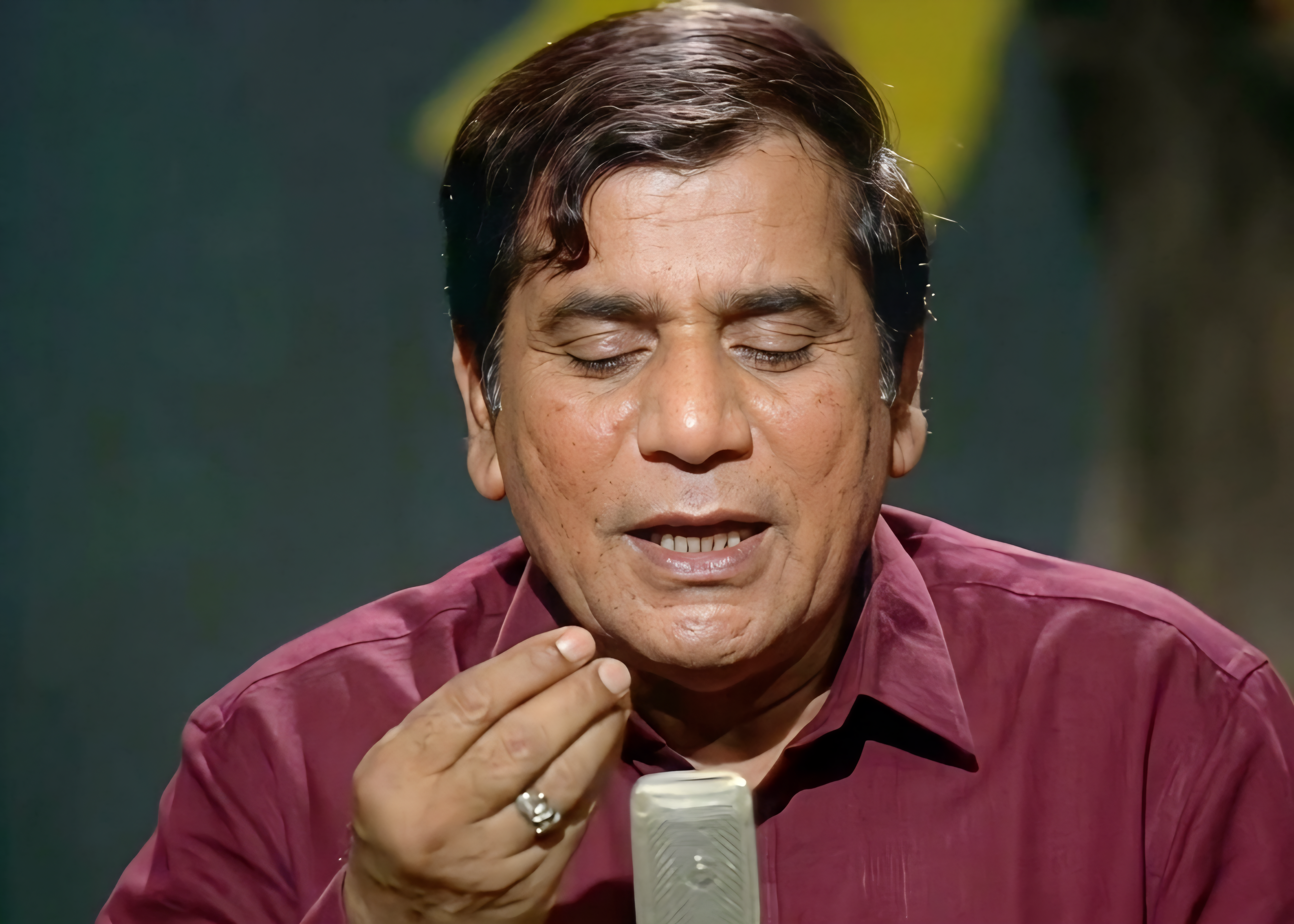
- Born: Masood Ahmad Rana; 6 August 1941; Mirpur Khas, Sindh
- Died: 4 October 1995 (aged 54); Punjab, Pakistan
- Awards: Won 2 Nigar Awards (1965) and (1971)
- Musical career
- Occupation: Film Playback Singer
- Instrument: Vocals
- Years active: 1955 – 1995

Masood Rana (Urdu: مسعُود رانا; 6 August 1941 – 4 October 1995) was a Pakistani film playback singer. He began his singing career in 1962 with the film Inqalab, was one of the top male singers in Urdu and Punjabi films for more than three decades and remained a busy singer until his death in 1995.

Rana still holds the record for singing over 300 film songs each in Urdu and Punjabi, a record he shared with Ahmed Rushdi and Noor Jehan.

== Early life ==
Masood Rana was born in Mirpur Khas, Sindh, in what was then British India, on 6 August 1941. He was born in a Rajput land-owning family which had migrated from the East Punjab city of Jalandhar. He started his singing career on Radio Pakistan, Hyderabad, Sindh in 1955 and later helped establish a singing group in Karachi in the early 1960s with the Pakistani film actor Nadeem Baig and fellow singer Akhlaq Ahmed.

== Film career ==
=== Playback singer ===
Masood Rana got his first breakthrough when the noted Pakistani film actor Saqi introduced him to producer and director Iqbal Shehzad and the film composer Deebo Bhattacharya. His first film song was in the film Inqalab (1962) and the song was Mashriq ki tareek faza mein naya savera phoota hay composed by music director N. K. Rathore. But he gained more popularity from his second film Banjaran (1962) which was composed by music director Deebo Bhattacharya. He was initially introduced as "Pakistani Rafi" in the Pakistani film circles due to his vocal singing being similar to that of famous Indian singer Mohammed Rafi. Masood Rana initially tried to live up to this reputation and used to copy the famous Indian singer. Later he changed his mind and developed his own style of singing. He specialized in singing difficult songs in very high-pitched voice and was the first choice for music directors for film title and theme songs.

In 1964, the Punjabi song Tange Wala Khair Mangda in the film Daachi (1964) was a popular street song composed by veteran music director Ghulam Ahmed Chishti. He then became the most dominating male singer in both Urdu and Punjabi films when his six songs in film Hamarahi (1966) became mega- hits. Along with Ahmed Rushdi, Masood Rana is still one of the two male singers in Pakistani films who sang more than 300 songs in each of the two languages - Urdu and Punjabi. He sang in more than 550 films and he worked continuously from his first film in 1962 until his death in 1995. Rana was considered to be the most successful singer after Ahmed Rushdi.

=== Actor ===
Masood Rana also appeared as an actor in a few films but he was not successful in this field. He was a lead actor in film Shahi Faqeer (1970) and a side-hero in films Do Mutiaran (1968) and Yaar Badshah (1971). As a guest actor he was seen in films Sangdil (1968), Do Rangeeley (1972), Noukar Wohti Da (1974), Ajj Di Gall (1975), Khushia (1973) and Dostana (1982).

== Awards and recognition ==
- Nigar Award for Best Singer in 1965
- Nigar Award for Best Singer in 1971

== Death ==
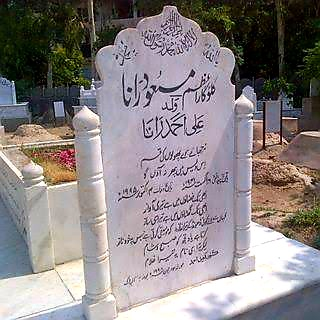
Rana's grave at Karim Block cemetery, Lahore

Masood Rana died on 4 October 1995 due to a heart attack during his journey on a train. He was laid to rest at Karim Block graveyard, Iqbal town, Lahore.

== Works ==
=== Patriotic songs ===
In addition to the film assignments, he also sang patriotic songs which became popular and are still played on the national days of Pakistan such as Pakistan Day. For film Aag Ka Darya (1966), he sang Ae watan hum hain teri shama kay parwanon main, Zindgi hosh main hay josh hay eemanon main, song lyrics written by the noted poet Josh Malihabadi. The other song is Sathio, mujahido, jaag utha hay sara watan, sathio, mujahido Masood Rana with Shaukat Ali for film Mujahid (1965). To pay tribute to the courage and sacrifice of Pakistani soldiers in the Indo-Pakistan War of 1965, he sang "Yaad Karta Hai Zamana Unhi Insaano Ko" in film Hamrahi (1966) composed by music director Tassaduq Hussain, film song lyrics by Muzaffar Warsi.

=== Top Urdu film songs ===
1. Tum he ho mehboob meray, main kyun nah tumhen pyar karun - film Aina Lyricist Khwaja Pervez (1966)
2. Karam ki ik nazar hum par Khuda ra, Ya Rasoo Lallah (saw) - film Hamrahi Lyricist Muzaffar Warsi (1966)
3. Koi saath day keh nah saath de, yeh safar akailay hi kaat lay - film Badnaam (1966)
4. Teri yaad aa gaee, gham khushi mein dhal gaey - film Chand aur Chandni Lyricist Saroor Barabankwi (1968)
5. Jhoom ae dil woh mera jan-e-bahar aaey ga - film Dil Mera Dharkan Teri (1968)
6. Mera khyayal ho tum meri aarzoo tum ho - film Nazneen Lyricist Kaleem Usmani (1969)
7. Mera mehboob aa gaya, mann mera lehra gaya - film Neend Hamari Khawab Tumharay Lyricist Kaleem Usmani(1971)
8. Tere bina yun gharian beetin, jaisay sadian beet gaeyin - film Aansoo Lyricist Khwaja Pervez 1971), Music: Nazir Ali
9. Mere dil ke hay awaz keh bichra yaar mile ga - film Baharo Phool Barsao Lyricist Shewan Rizvi 1972)
10. Aag laga kar chhupney walay sun mera afsanah - film Dillagi Lyricist Mushir Kazmi 1974)
11. Ae dil tujhay ab unsay kaisi yeh shikayat hai, woh samnay baithay hain kaafi yeh inayat hai (Shararat Lyricist Masroor Anwar (1963))

=== Top Punjabi film songs ===
1. Tange wala khair mangda, tanga Lahore da howe tay phanwen Jhangh da - film Daachi (1964), music by Baba G.A. Chishti
2. Sajna ne buhey aggay chik tann layi - film Bharia Mela (1966)
3. Yaaran naal baharan sajna - film Yaaran Naal Baharan (1967)
4. Soch ke yaar banawin bandia - film Jigri Yaar (1967)
5. Dil dian lagian janay na, mera pyar pachanay na - film Baooji (1968)
6. Tere hath ki bedardey aaya phullan jeya dil tor ke - film Sheran Di Jori (1969)
7. Ya apna kise nu kar lay, ya aap kise da ho belia - film Dil Dian Laggian (1970)
8. Tere madh bharey nain mil pain, te chandra sharab chhad de - film Jeera Blade (1973)
9. Sajno ae nagri daata di aithey aanda kul zamana - film Nagri Daata Di (1974)
10. Yaar mangia si Rabba teithun ro ke, kehri main khudai mang leyi - film Ishq Nachawy Gali Gali (1984)

=== Top Urdu duets ===
1. Sathio, mujahido, jaag utha hay sara watan (with Shaukat Ali) - film Mujahid (1965)
2. Door veeraney mein ik shama hay roshan kab se (with Mala) - film (Naila 1965)
3. De ga na koi sahara, in bedard fazaon mein (with Naseem Begum) - film (Kon Kisi Ka (1966)
4. Madeenay waley sey mera salaam keh dena (with Ahmed Rushdi) - film Bhayya (1966)
5. Ik aur baat mani, ik aur zakham khaya (with Irene Parveen) - film Badnaam (1966)
6. Tujhe pyar ki qasm hay, mera pyar ban ke aaja (with Mala) - film Chand aur Chandni (1968)
7. O mere shoukh sanam, hua deevana tera jab se tumhe (with Mala) (Sangdil 1968)
8. Haar dena na himmat kahin, ek sa waqt rehta nahin (with Mala) - film Pak Daman (1969)
9. Bheegi bheegi thandi hawa (with Runa Laila) _ film Ehsaas (1972)
10. Yeh waada karo ke mohabbat karen ge (with Noor Jehan) - film Daman Aur Chingari (1973)

=== Top Punjabi duets ===
1. Sadi ajab kahani ae, bhul ke puraney dukhray (with Mala) - film Mera Mahi (1964)
2. Nikke hundian da pyar, wekhin devin na wisar (with Irene Parveen) - film Mirza Jatt (1967)
3. We lakh tarley pawen mundia, teinu pyar nein karna (with Noor Jehan) - film Dhee Rani (1969)
4. Teri akh da nein jawab, tey bhulian khiria surkh gulab (with Naseem Begum) -Mukhra Chann Warga (1969)
5. Dil de ke te nasiye na, je ro ke wikha dena (with Noor Jehan) - film Nikkay Hundian Da Pyar (1969)
6. Lal meri patt rakhio bala Jhooley Lalan Dey (with Sain Akhtar and Munir Hussain) - film Varyam (1969)
7. Lang aa ja pattan Chanaan da yaar (with Tasawur Khanum) - film Ajj da Mehinwal (1973)
8. Chup ker ke gaddi day wich beh ja, jai bolain gee chapair khaain gee (with Mehnaz) - film Warrant (1975)
9. Haey mar gaii, thaan mar gaii (with Naheed Akhtar) - film Baadal (1987)
10. Yaad sataey, chain na aay, kalian nein jee sakna (with Noor Jehan) - film Aan Milo Sajna (1994)
