= List of Urdu films =

This article lists Urdu-language films in order by year of production. The films listed below are mostly from Pakistan, along with some Indian Urdu movies. For a full list of Pakistani films, including Punjabi language, Bengali language and Urdu films, see List of Pakistani films. Bollywood movies from India which feature as Hindi films are mostly made in the Hindustani language. Similarly, Urdu films are also made in the Hindustani language. Modern Urdu and modern Hindi are more similar in overall vocabulary. See List of Bollywood films.

== 1940s ==
Title	Director	Cast	Genre	Notes
1948
Teri Yaad	Daud Chand	Asha Posley, Nasir Khan, Najma, Kiran Rani, Ghulam Mohammad, Sardar Mohammad, Ghulam Qadir, Nazar, Jahangir Khan	Drama	Released on 7 August 1948, Teri Yaad was the first commercial film entirely made in Pakistan.
1949
Ghalat Fehmi		Asha Posley, Jahangir Khan, Nazar		
Hichkolay	Daud Chand	Ajmal, Akhtari, Sudhir, M. Ismail	Drama	
Sachai		Sawarn Lata, Nazir Ahmed Khan, Majeed		
Shahida	Luqman	Shamim Bano, Nasir Khan, Shakir, Hamaliya Wala	Drama	Released on 19 March 1949, Shahida was the first "Pakistani film" that was started before the partition of India.

== 1950s ==
Title	Director	Cast	Genre	Notes
1950
	Nazir Ahmed Khan; Nazar		Drama	
Amanat	Hyder Shah	Darpan; Nazar	Drama	Film actor Darpan's debut film
Beqarar	Nazir Ajmeri	Ragni, S. Gul, Shammi, Noor Mohammed Charlie, Majeed	Drama	Released on 17 July 1950
Do Ansoo	Anwar Kamal Pasha	Sabiha Khanum, Santosh Kumar, Shamim Bano, Ajmal, Allauddin	Drama	Released on 7 April 1950, Do Aansoo was the first ever Urdu Silver Jubilee film in Pakistan.
Do Kinaray		Akhtari, Suresh, Zarif		
Humari Basti	Shakoor Qadri	Murtaza Gilani, Najma, Shah Nawaz	Drama	
Judai		Shahina, Sadiq Ali, Nazar		
Kundan		Ragni, Shakir, Hamalia Wala		
1951
Akaely	M.M. Mehra	Santosh Kumar, Nazar, Ragni	Drama	
Eid		Yasmin, Najmul Hassan, Suresh		
Ghairat		Sabiha Khanum, Masood, Allauddin		
Humwatan		Sahira, Farraukh, Ajmal		
Pinjra		Sabiha Khanum, Masood, Azad		
1952
Bheegi Palkain		Sawarn Lata, Nazir Ahmed Khan	Romance film	
Dopatta	Sibtain Fazli	Noor Jehan, Ajay Kumar, Sudhir, Yasmin	Musical; Drama	Released on 29 March 1952, with music by Feroz Nizami. Noor Jehan appeared in her first Pakistani Urdu film.
Harjai		Najma, Masood, Asif Jah		
Khanabadosh		Manorma, Pran, Ajmal		
Shola		Asha Posley, Masood, Arshad		
1953
Aaghosh	Murtaza Gilani	Gulshan Ara, M. Ismail, Santosh Kumar, Sabiha Khanum	Drama	
Awaaz	Khadim Mohiudin	Gulshan Ara; Santosh Kumar	Drama	
Barkha	Shaikh Hassan	Nazar, Asha Posley, Sabiha Khanum	Drama	
Ghulam	Anwar Kamal Pasha	Sabiha Khanum, Santosh Kumar, Shammi		
Gulnar	Imtiyaz Ali Taj	Noor Jehan, Santosh Kumar, Bibbo, Zarif, Shahnawaz	Musical; Drama	Released on 6 November 1953, with music by Ghulam Haider
Ilzam		Shammi, Rafiq Anwar, Naeem Hashmi		
Mehbooba		Shammi, Santosh Kumar, Asha Posley		
Sailaab		Sabiha Khanum, Masood, Hamalia Wala		
Tarrap		Shammi, Sudhir, Allauddin		
1954
Deewar		Gulshan Ara, Sudhir, Allauddin		
Gumnaam	Anwar Kamal Pasha	Sabiha Khanum, Sudhir, Ragni, M. Ismael, Asif Jah, Nasreen, Ghulam Mohammed, Himalaya Wala	Musical; Drama	Released on 26 March 1954. The music director was Inayat Hussain, with film song lyrics by Saifuddin Saif.
Mujrim		Gulshan Ara, Yousuf Khan, Allauddin		
Perwaaz		Sabiha Khanum, Yousuf Khan, Asha Posley, Nazar		Veteran actor Yousuf Khan made his film debut in Perwaz.
Raat Ki Baat		Sabiha Khanum, Santosh Kumar, Allauddin		
Ruhi	W.Z. Ahmad	Shammi, Santosh Kumar, Hamalia Wala		The first film to be banned in Pakistan. Music by Rasheed Attre.
Sassi	Daud Chand	Shah Nawaz, Nazar, Asha Posley, Sabiha Khanum, Sudhir	Musical	Released on 3 June 1954, with music by Ghulam Ahmed Chishti.
1955
Humari Zaban	Shaikh Hassan	Beena, Sheikh Hassan	Drama	Released on 10 June 1955, Hamari Zuban was the first ever Karachi-made film in Pakistan.
Inteqaam	Anwar Kamal Pasha	Sabiha Khanum, Santosh Kumar, M. Ismael		
Ilteja	Chaudhry Feroz Gul	Ragni, S. Gul, Salim Raza		
Intekhaab	Humayun Mirza	Jamila Razzaq, Masood		
Jallan	Shabab Kairanvi	Nadira, Inayat Hussain Bhatti, Zarif		
Jheel Kinaray	Nizam Nakhuda	Gulshan Ara, Sudhir, Talish		
Khatoon	Nazir	Sawarn Lata, Nazir, Naeem Hashmi		
Khizaan Ke Baad	Khadim Mohiuddin	Shammi, Sudhir, Allauddin		
Mehfil	Sharif Nayyar	Sabiha Khanum, Sudhir, Allauddin	Romance film	
Naukar	M.M. Billoo Mehra	Sawarn Lata, Nazir, Shaad, Ragni, Zeenat, Asha Posley, ChunChun, A. Shah, G.N. Butt and Agha Salim Raza	Drama	Released on 24 May 1955. The film music was written by Ghulam Ahmed Chishti.
Nazrana	Murtaza Gilani, Saqlain Rizvi, Ragni, Santosh Kumar, Nazar, Azad			
Qatil	Anwar Kamal Pasha	Sabiha Khanum, Santosh Kumar, Aslam Pervaiz, Musarrat Nazir, Nayyar Sultana, Akmal Khan	Drama	Released on 22 January 1955. The music director was Inayat Hussain and the song lyrics were written by Qateel Shifai.
Shararay	Afzal Jehangir	Sabiha Khanum, Ragni, S. Gul		
Sohni		Sabiha Khanum, Sudhir, Shammi		
Toofan	Haidar Shah	Sabiha Khanum, Sudhir, Asha Posley, Zarif	Drama	Released on 31 July 1955, with music by Ghulam Ahmed Chishti.
1956
Anokhi	Shahnawaz	Sheela Ramani, Shaad, Lehri	Romance film	
Baaghi	Ashfaq Malik	Allauddin, Musarrat Nazir, Sultan Rahi, Sudhir, Agha Talish	Drama	Sultan Rahi's debut film as an actor. Music by Rehman Verma.
Chhoti Begum	Ataullah Hashmi	Sabiha Khanum, Sudhir, Naeem Hashmi	Drama	Music by Tassaduq Hussain, film song lyrics by Qateel Shifai. This film was a "Golden Jubilee" film (i.e. with a run of more than 50 weeks in cinemas).
Darbar-e-Habib	Sheikh Latif	Yasmin, Talish, Majeed		
Funkar	Mohammad Hassan	Khursheed Bano, Aslam Pervaiz, Jamila Razzaq		
Hameeda	Munshi Dil	Sabiha Khanum, Santosh Kumar, Ejaz Durrani	Romance film	Music by Safdar Hussain
Haqeeqat		Yasmin, Masood, Zeenat		
Hatim	Daud Chand	Sabiha Khanum, Sudhir, Nazar, Ilyas Kashmiri	Drama	
Intezar	Masood Pervez	Noor Jehan, Santosh Kumar, Asha Posley, Ghulam Mohammad	Drama	Released on 12 May 1956. The music director was Khwaja Khurshid Anwar.
Kanwari Bewah	Najam Naqvi	Shamim Ara, Ayyaz, Nazar	Drama	Shamim Ara's debut film as an actress. Veteran film director Najam Naqvi's first film in Pakistan.
Karnaama	Iqbal Hussain	Klawati, Luddan, Sawan		
Lakht-e-Jiggar	Luqman	Noor Jehan, Santosh Kumar, Habib-ur- Rehman	Drama	Released on 17 February 1956, with music by Ghulam Ahmed Chishti.
Mandi	Aziz Ahmed	Khursheed, Ayyaz, Nighat	Drama	
Mirza Sahiban	Daud Chand	Musarrat Nazir; Sudhir	Drama	Released on 30 May 1956
Miss 56	Roop Kumar Shorey	Meena Shorey, Santosh Kumar, Aslam Pervaiz	Romance film	Music by Ghulam Ahmed Chishti
Pawwan		Shammi, Sudhir, Zarif, Nazir		
Qismat		Musarrat Nazir, Santosh Kumar, Yasmin	Drama	
Sabira		Sawarn Lata, Nazir, Nazar, Ilyas Kashmiri	Romance film	
Sarfarosh	Anwar Kamal Pasha	Sabiha Khanum, Santosh Kumar, Meena Shorey, Asif Jah, Ghulam Mohammad	Romance; Drama	Released on 30 May 1956, with music by Rasheed Attre.
Shalimar	S. H. Zaidi	Rehana, Sudhir, Shola, Nazar	Romance film	
Shikar	Rafiq Anwar	Safia Deen, Rushdi, Ayyaz		
Sauteli Maa		Sawarn Lata, Nazir, Nazar, Masood	Drama	
Wehshi	Munawwar Qasim	Rehana, Afzal, Nazir, Zarif	Drama	
1957
Aankh ka Nasha	Sibtain Fazli	Sabiha Khanum, Sudhir, Musarrat Nazir, Neelo, Aslam Pervaiz,	Drama	Music by Inayat Hussain
Aas Paas	M. A. Rasheed	Sabiha Khanum, Aslam Pervaiz, Allauddin	Romance	Music by Akhtar Hussain Akhian
Anjaam		Yasmin, Ilyas Kashmiri, Neelo	Romance film	
Baap Ka Gunaah		Musarrat Nazir, Darpan, Salim	Drama	
Bara Aadmi		Meena Shorey, Ejaz Durrani, Allauddin	Drama	
Bedari	Rafiq Ghaznavi	Ratan Kumar, Ragni, Santosh Kumar, Meena Shorey, Anoradha, Qazi Wajid as the student boy with stammering problem	Drama, Comedy	Released on 6 December 1957, with music by Ustad Fateh Ali Khan.
Daata	Ataullah Hashmi	Sabiha Khanum, Sudhir, Ghulam Mohammad	Drama	Music by Tassaduq Hussain
Ishq-e-Laila	Munshi Dil	Sabiha Khanum, Santosh Kumar, Asha Posley, M. Ismael, Ajmal, Allauddin	Musical, Romance, Drama	Released on 12 April 1957, with music by Safdar Hussain and film song lyrics by Qateel Shifai.
Laila Majnu		Bahar, Aslam Pervaiz, Shola, Ilyas Kashmiri	Romance film	
Maasoom		Yasmin, Habib, M. Ismael		
Maska Polish		Anoradha, Ayyaz, Azad		
Muraad	Daud Chand	Yasmin, Syed Kamal, Ilyas Kashmiri	Romance film	Music by Safdar Hussain with vocals by Iqbal Bano.
Nigar	Naeem Hashmi	Shahina, Ammaan, Naeem Hashmi	Drama	
Noor-e-Islam	Nazir	Sawarn Lata, Darpan, Nazir, Naeem Hashmi	Drama	Music by Hassan Latif
Paasban		Sabiha Khanum, Aslam Pervaiz, Allauddin	Drama	
Saat Lakh	Jafar Malik	Sabiha Khanum, Santosh Kumar, Nayyar Sultana, Neelo, Talish, Asif Jah, Hamalia Wala	Musical; Drama	Released on 9 October 1957 and ran for more than 50 weeks. Music director was Rasheed Attre.
Seestan		Musarrat Nazir, Shaad, Salim Raza		
Shohrat		Nasrin, Habib, Ilyas Kashmiri, Ajmal	Drama	
Thandi Sarak		Musarrat Nazir, Syed Kamal, Zarif	Romance film	Syed Kamal's debut film
Waadah	W. Z. Ahmad	Sabiha Khanum, Santosh Kumar, Laila, Ilyas Kashmiri	Musical, Romance, Drama	Released on 2 May 1957, with music by Rasheed Attre and songs written by Saifuddin Saif. Waadah was Laila's debut film.
1958
Aadmi	Luqman	Yasmin, Habib, Nayyar Sultana, Diljeet Mirza, Talish and Allauddin	Drama	Released on 14 November 1958
Akhri Dao		Nayyar Sultana, Habib, Talish	Drama	
Akhri Nishan	Ashfaq Malik	Meena Shorey, Sudhir, Allauddin	Drama	Music by Rehman Verma
Anarkali	Anwar Kamal Pasha	Noor Jehan, Sudhir, Ragni, Shamim Ara, Zarif, Fazal Haq and Hamalia Wala	Musical	Released on 6 June 1958, with music by Rasheed Attre and Inayat Hussain.
Begunnah		Nayyar Sultana, Anwar Baig, Butt Kashir		
Bharosa		Yasmin, Yousuf Khan, Allauddin		
Changez Khan	Rafiq Sarhadi	Neelo, Kamran, Rakhshi, Allauddin, Asha Posley, Laila	Action film	
Darbar		Sabiha Khanum, Habib, Allauddin		
Dil Mein Too		Sabiha Khanum, Ejaz Durrani, Nayyar Sultana		
Hasrat		Sabiha Khanum, Santosh Kumar, Yousuf Khan	Romance film	
Jaan-e-Bahar	Shaukat Hussain Rizvi	Musarrat Nazir, Sudhir, Husna	Romance film	
Naya Daur		Jamila Razzaq, Aslam Pervaiz, Neelo		
Naya Zamana		Musarrat Nazir, Santosh Kumar, M. Ismael	Romance film	
Rukhsana		Musarrat Nazir, Darpan, Nayyar Sultana	Romance film	
Tamanna		Yasmin, Ejaz Durrani, Nighat Sultana		
Tauheed		Nayyar Sultana, Talish, Laila	Drama	
Wah Re Zamanay		Shamim Ara, Ejaz Durrani, Rattan Kumar		
Zehr-e-Ishq	Masood Pervez	Musarrat Nazir, Habib, Yasmin, Neelo, Bibbo	Musical; Romance	Released on 21 April 1958, with songs and music by Khawaja Khurshid Anwar.
1959
Apna Paraya		Shamim Ara, Syed Kamal	Romance film	
Faisla		Shamim Ara, Yousuf Khan, Deeba, Jamila Razzaq		Deeba started her film career as a child artist in this film.
Gumrah		Kafira, Habib, Naeem Hashmi		
Jago Hua Severa	Aaejay Kardar	Tripti Mitra, Zurain Rakhshi, Anees Ama, Kazi Khaliq, Maina Latif	Drama	The first Dhaka-based Urdu film.
Jhoomer	Masud Pervaiz	Musarrat Nazir; Sudhir, Naeem Hashmi	Drama	Film songs by music director Khwaja Khurshid Anwar
Koel	Khwaja Khurshid Anwar	Noor Jehan, Aslam Pervaiz, Neelo, Nazar, Sahira, Ghulam Mohammad, Azad and Allauddin	Musical; Drama	Released on 24 December 1959, with music by Khwaja Khurshid Anwar.
Nagin	Khalil Qaisar	Neelo, Rattan Kumar, Husna, Yousuf Khan, Nazar, Rekha, Saqi and Abbas Ajmeri	Musical	Released on 18 June 1959, with songs and music by Safdar Hussain.
Naghma-e-Dil		Sabiha Khanum, Santosh Kumar, Naeem Hashmi		
Neend	Hassan Tariq	Noor Jehan, Aslam Pervaiz, Neelo, Yasmin, Asad Jaafri	Musical	Released on 16 October 1959, with music by Rasheed Attre.
Raaz	Humayun Mirza	Musarrat Nazir, Ejaz Durrani	Drama	Music by Feroz Nizami
Savera		Shamim Ara, Syed Kamal	Romance film	
Shama		Swaran Lata, Nazir, Naeem Hashmi	Romance film	
Society		Musarrat Nazir, Sudhir	Romance film	
Sola Aanay		Neelo, Ejaz Durrani	Romance film	
Tere Baghair		Sabiha Khanum, Santosh Kumar		

== 1960s ==
Title	Director	Cast	Genre	Notes
1960
Aladdin Ka Beta		Neelo, Rattan Kumar, Talish		
Aur Bhi Gham Hain		Jameela, Jaafri, Lehri		
Ayaz	Luqman	Sabiha Khanum, Habib, Kemal, Nayyar Sultana, Neelo, Nighat Sultana, Zeenat, Reekha, Naeem Hashmi and Shahnawaz	Drama	Released on 29 April 1960. The film story is about the Great Afghan conqueror Mehmood Ghaznavi and his "servant" Ayaz. Super-hit music by Khawaja Khurshid Anwar.
Bhabhi	Ataullah Shah Hashmi	Shamim Ara, Aslam Pervaiz, Yasmin	Romance film	Music by Tassaduq Hussain
Clerk		Musarrat Nazir, Khalil Qaisar		
Daku Ki Larki		Musarrat Nazir, Ejaz Durrani, Allauddin		
Dil-e-Nadan		Musarrat Nazir, Syed Kamal, Shahnawaz		
Do Ustad		Shamim Ara, Rattan Kumar, Ilyas Kashmiri		
Gulbadan		Musarrat, Ejaz, Sheikh Iqbal		
Hamsafar		Yasmin, Aslam Pervaiz, Nazar		
Insaaf		Neelo, Kamall, M. Ismael		
Izzat		Shamim Ara, Ejaz Durrani, Habib		
Khaibar Mail		Neelo, Aslam Pervaiz, Nayyar Sultana		
Khan Bhahadur		Musarrat, Kamaal, Laila		
Laggan		Husna, Aslam, Yousuf		
Manzil		Neelo, Ejaz, Aslam, Nazar		
Neelofar		Neelo, Rattan Kumar, Nasira		
Noukri	M.K.Pasha	Musarrat Nazir, Darpan, M.Ismail, Asha Posley, lehri		
Raat Ke Rahi	Iqbal Yousuf	Rehana, Darpan, Shamim Ara, Talish	Drama	Released on 28 October 1960, with hit music by A. Hameed
Rahguzar	Zia Sarhady	Sabiha Khanum, Aslam Pervaiz, Nayyar Sultana, Agha Talish	Musical; Drama	Released on 22 January 1960
Roopmati Baaz Bahadur		Shamim Ara, Aslam Pervaiz, Talish		
Saheli	S. M. Yousuf	Nayyar Sultana, Darpan, Shamim Ara, Bahar, Aslam Pervez	Musical; Drama	Released on 23 December 1960. A landmark film for producer-director S. M. Yusuf, music director A. Hameed and film songs lyricist Fayyaz Hashmi. Box office: super-hit.
Salma	Ashfaq Malik	Yasmin, Ejaz Durrani, Bahar Begum, Allauddin, A. Shah	Drama	Released on 9 June 1960, with music by Rasheed Attre. Noor Jehan started her career as (Urdu) playback singer in this film.
Shaam Dhalay	Santosh Kumar	Sabiha Khanum, Santosh Kumar, Ruskhsana	Drama	Released on 16 December 1960, with music by Rasheed Attre. The only film by Santosh Kumar as producer, director and hero.
Watan		Musarrat Nazir, Syed Kamal, Ejaz Durrani		
1961
Ajab Khan		Husna, Sudhir, Talish		
Barah Bajje		Neelo, Allauddin		
Do Raste	Qadeer Ghori	Bahar Begum, Yousuf Khan, Ejaz Durrani, Neelo	Romance film	Music by Master Inayat Hussain
Farishta	Luqman	Yasmin, Ejaz Durrani, Talish, Allauddin	Drama	Released on 17 March 1961, with music by Rasheed Attre. This film was based on a Russian novel.
Ghalib	M.M. Billoo Mehra	Noor Jehan, Sudhir	Biography, Musical, Drama	Released on 24 November 1961, with music by Tassaduq Hussain. This was Noor Jehan's last film appearance as an actress.
Ghazi Bin Abbas		Husna, Rattan Kumar		
Gul Bakavli	Munshi Dil	Jamila Razzaq, Sudhir	Drama	Released on 27 October 1961. The first Pakistani black & white film with colour songs.
Gulfam	S. Suleman	Musarrat Nazir, Darpan	Drama	Released on 29 December 1961. Music by Rasheed Attre and film song lyrics by Tanvir Naqvi
Gulfarosh		Nayyar Sultana, Syed Kamal |Naeem Hashmi|		
Hum Aik Hain		Jamila Razzaq, Aslam Pervaiz		
Insan Badalta Hai		Shamim Ara, Darpan		
Lakhon Fasane		Sozi, Darpan		
Mangol		Musarrat Nazir, Aslam Pervaiz		
Saperan	Daud Chand	Laila, Habib	Drama	Released on 8 December 1961, with music by M. Ashraf and Master Manzoor Ahmed team named "Manzoor–Ashraf" in 1961.
Shaer-e-Islam		Laila, Rattan Kumar		
Son of Ali Baba		Nayyar Sultana, Aslam Pervaiz, Naeem Hashmi	Romance film	
Subha Kahin Sham Kahin		Neelo, Syed Kamal, Naeem Hashmi		
Surayya		Nayyar Sultana, Habib		
Taj Aur Talwar		Laila, Ratan Kumar		
Zamana Kya Kahega	Iqbal Yousuf	Shamim Ara, Syed Kamal		
1962
Aanchal	Al-Hamid	Shamim Ara, Darpan, Saba, Talish	Musical; Drama	Released on 7 December 1962. Music director was Khalil Ahmed and film song lyrics by Himayat Ali Shair.
Ajnabi		Bahar Begum, Ejaz Durrani, Diljeet Mirza		
Aulaad	S. M. Yousuf	Nayyar Sultana, Habib, Waheed Murad, Rehana	Musical; Drama	Released on 3 August 1962. Waheed Murad's film debut. A Golden Jubilee film of 1962 with super-hit film songs by music director A. Hameed, film song lyrics by Fayyaz Hashmi.
Awaz De Kahan Hai		Yasmin, Akmal, Talish		
Azra	Munshi Dil	Neelo, Ejaz, Nazar, Talish, Allauddin, Naeem Hashmi	Musical; Drama	Released on 20 April 1962. This film had a mega-hit film song "Jaan-E-Baharaan Rashk-E-Chaman" sung by Saleem Raza, music by Master Inayat Hussain and film song lyrics by Tanvir Naqvi.
Banjaran	Hassan Tariq	Neelo, Syed Kamal, Azad, Allauddin	Musical; Drama	Released on 14 September 1962. A hit film with music by Deebo Bhattacharya.
Barsaat Mein		Neelo, Ejaz Durrani, Allauddin		
Beta		Bahar Begum, Aslam Pervaiz, Husna, Laila		
Chanda	Captain Ehtesham	Rehman, Shabnam, Sultana Zaman	Musical; Drama	Urdu film debut of Shabnam and Rehman
Chiragh Jalta Raha	Fazal Ahmad Karim Fazli	Mohammad Ali, Arif, Deeba, Zeba Ali	Drama	Released on 9 March 1962. Film debut for Zeba, Mohammad Ali, Deeba, Talat Hussain. Music by Nihal Abdullah. A super-hit landmark movie of 1962.
Daal Mein Kala		Bahar, Kemal, Mohammad Ali		
Darwaaza	Saifuddin Saif	Neelo, Yousuf Khan, Talish Naeem Hashmi		
Dosheeza		Neelo, Ejaz Durrani, Aslam Pervaiz, Talish		
Ek Manzil Do Rahein		Musarrat, Aslam, Husna		
Ghunghat	Khurshid Anwar	Nayyar Sultana; Santosh Kumar	Musical; Drama	Released on 3 November 1962, with super-hit film songs by Khurshid Anwar.
Jab Se Dekha Hai Tumhay	Munawwar Rasheed	Darpan, Agha Jan, Lehri, Zeba Ali	Musical	Released on 29 March 1962
Husn-o-Ishq		Neelo, Ratan Kumar, Ragni		
Inqalaab		Jameela, Habib, Shamim Ara		
Mehboob	Anwar Kamal Pasha	Rani, Shamim Ara, Habib, Yousuf Khan, Talish	Drama	Released on 3 November 1962. Rani's film debut.
Mehtab	Shabab Keranvi	Nayyar Sultana, Habib, Naghma, Rukhsana, Asad, Zeenat, Hameed Wayin, Allauddin	Musical; Drama	Released on 7 September 1962
Mera Kiya Qasoor		Shamim Ara, Asad, Saqi		
Mausiqaar	Qadeer Ghouri	Sabiha, Santosh, Meena, Abbas Nosha, Nusrat Kardar, Saqi, Sikkedar, Laddan, M.D. Sheikh	Musical; Drama	Released on 22 June 1962, with music by Rasheed Attre.
Qaidi	Najam Naqvi	Shamim Ara, Darpan, Nazar, Talish	Drama	Released on 15 May 1962, with music by Rasheed Attre. Features a mega-hit film song written by the renowned poet Faiz Ahmed Faiz.
Shaheed	Khalil Qaisar	Musarrat Nazir, Ejaz, Husna, Saqi, Diljeet Mirza, Hamalia Wala, Allauddin & Talish	Drama	Released on 5 January 1962, with music by Rasheed Attre and film songs written by renowned poet Munir Niazi.
Suraj Mukhi		Bahar Begum, Aslam Pervaiz, Asif Jah	Romance film	Film debut for music director Master Abdullah.
Susral	Riaz Shahid	Laila, Yousuf, Rukhsana, Allauddin	Musical; Drama	Released on 14 September 1962, with music by Hassan Latif.
Zareena		Husna, Yousuf, Habib, Naghma, Naeem Hashmi		
1963
Aurat Ek Kahani		Nayyar Sultana, Ejaz Durrani, Husna		
Baghawat		Shammi, Sudhir, Akmal, Nayyar		
Baaji	S. Suleman	Nayyar Sultana, Darpan, Zeba, Talish	Drama	Released on 3 May 1963 with super-hit music by music directors Salim Iqbal.
Daaman	Qadeer Ghori	Sabiha Khanum, Santosh Kumar, Neelo, Waheed Murad, Lehri, Tarana	Drama	Released on 4 October 1963, with music by Khalil Ahmed
Dil Ne Tujhe Maan Liya		Zeba, Kemal, Mohammad Ali		
Ek Tera Sahara	Najam Naqvi	Shamim Ara, Darpan, Rani, Asad Jaafri	Musical; Drama	Released on 29 November 1963, with super-hit music by Master Inayat Hussain
Fanoos	Nakhshab Jarchavi	Komal, Suleman, Ilyas Kashmiri	Romance film	Music by Nashad
Ghazala		Shamim Ara, Habib, Nazar		
Hamein Bhi Jeene Do		Nazi, Hanif, Kamaal Irani		
Ishq Par Zoor Nahin		Jameela, Aslam, Ilyas		This film had super-hit music by Master Inayat Hussain.
Kala Aadmi		Neelo, Habib, Rukhsana		
Kala Pani		Shamim Ara, Sudhir, Habib		
Maa Beti		Yasmin, Yousuf, Rukhsana		
Maa Ke Aansoo		Nayyar, Habib, Naghma, Zeenat		
Main Ne Kya Jurm Kiya		Laila, Habib, Aslam		
Marvi		Nighat, Fazlani, Rukhsana		
Nateeja		Naeem Hashmi|		
Neelam		Rukhsana, Sudhir, Asad		
Preet Na Jane Reet		Shabnum, Khalil, Mustafa		
Qanoon		Shamim Ara, Allauddin, Naeem Hashmi		
Qatal Ke Baad		Neelo, Kamaal, Aslam		
Sazish		Shamim Ara, Habib, Naghma		
Seema		Shamim Ara, Santosh, Sultan		
Shararat		Bahar, Mohammad Ali, Laila		
Shikwa		Neelo, Darpan, Sabiha, Nazar		
Suhag		Bahar, Habib, Nighat		
Sumera		Zeba, Rattan Kumar, Naghma		
Talash		Shabnam, Rehman, Akbar		
Tange Wala		Shamim Ara, Darpan, Nayyar		
Teer Andaaz		Rukhsana, Sultan, Saba		
Yahudi Ki Larki		Nayyar, Darpan, Shahnawaz		
1964
Ashiana	S. M. Yousuf	Zeba, Syed Kamal, Habib, Rukhsana, Nighat Sultana, Lehri, Nabeela, Asad Jaafri, Asha Posley, Faizi, Najmul Hassan, Adeeb	Musical; Drama	Released on 9 October 1964, with super-hit music by A. Hameed
Andhi Muhabbat		Laila, Syed Kamal, Talish		
Aurat Ka Pyaar		Rani, Mohammad Ali, Allauddin		
Azad		Bahar Begum, Santosh Kumar, Asad, Ajmal		
Baap Ka Baap		Shamim Ara, Darpan, Nazar		
Baghi Sipahi		Zeba, Sudhir, Asad		
Bandhan		Chitra, Mustafa, Rozi		
Bees Din		Rani, Mohammad Ali, Adeeb		
Beti		Neelo, Ejaz Durrani, Talish		
Chingari	Khursheed Anwar	Shamim Ara, Santosh Kumar, Ejaz Durrani, Saloni, Komal, Nighat Sultana	Musical; Drama	Released on 23 October 1964, with hit music by Khawaja Khurshid Anwar
Chhoti Ammi	Wazir Ali	Rani, Rattan Kumar, Lehri		
Chhoti Behan		Rani, Syed Kamal, Mohammad Ali		
Deewana		Sabiha Khanum, Ejaz Durrani, Deeba Begum, Habib		
Farangi	Khalil Qaisar	Shamim Ara, Sudhir, Bahar Begum, Allauddin, Saqi, Mazhar Shah, Talish	Drama	Released on 18 December 1964. Had excellent music by Rasheed Attre with vocals by Mehdi Hassan for a famous ghazal by Faiz Ahmed Faiz
Ek Dil Do Dewaanay		Rani, Kamal, Zeenat Begum		
Gehra Daagh		Neelo, Ejaz Durrani, Talish		
Ghadaar		Saloni, Sudhir, Mohammad Ali		
Haveli	Khalil Qaisar	Shamim Ara, Santosh Kumar, Ejaz Durrani, Talish	Musical; Drama	Released on 23 October 1964.Super-hit music by Khawaja Khurshid Anwar
Head Constable		Zeba, Mohammad Ali, Habib, Yasmin	Drama	This was music director Nisar Bazmi's first film in Pakistan after he migrated from India.
Heera Aur Pathar	Pervaiz Malik	Zeba, Waheed Murad, Nirala	Romance film	This was a hit film of 1964 with super-hit music by Sohail Rana and superb song lyrics by Masroor Anwar
Inspector		Naghma, Nazar, Panna, Azad		
Ishrat		Sabiha Khanum, Santosh Kumar, Allauddin		
Jameela		Sabira, Habib, M. Ismael		
Jhalak		Laila, Syed Kamal, Allauddin		
Karwan		Shabnam, Haroon, Tarana		
Khaibar Pass		Neelo, Sudhir, Rukhsana		
Khamosh Raho	Jamil Akhtar	Deeba, Yousuf Khan, Mohammad Ali, Meena Shorey	Romance film, Musical film	Music director Khalil Ahmed and film song lyricist Himayat Ali Shair got their breakthroughs in the film world with this hit film.
Khandan	Riaz Ahmad Raju	Bahar Begum, Akmal Khan, Habib, Mohammad Ali	Drama	A hit film of 1964 with music by Rehman Verma
Lunda Bazar		Bahar Begum, Asad, Asif Jah		
Lutera		Bahar Begum, Aslam Pervaiz, Talish	Drama	This film had one super-hit film song by Nasim Begum, with music by Saif Chughtai.
Maa Ka Pyaar		Sabira, Habib, Adeeb		
Maihkhana	Nakhshab Jarchavi	Shamim Ara, Habib, Hanif	Musical film	This film flopped despite excellent music by music director Nashad.
Mamta		Bahar Begum, Habib, Waheed Murad		
Millan		Deeba, Rehman, Akbar		
Nehle Pe Dehla		Neelo, Syed Kamal, Sawan		
Paigham		Shamim Ara, Sultan, Rukhsana		
Paise		Shabnam, Azeem, Akbar		
Pyaar Ki Saza		Shamim Ara, Syed Kamal, Rukhsana		
Pyaar Na Karna Nadaan		Nighat, Talish, Saqi		
Safaid Khoon		Rani, Santosh Kumar, Mohammad Ali |Naeem Hashmi|		
Sangam		Rozi, Haroon, Khalil		"Sangam" was the first ever colored film released in Pakistan on 23 April 1964.
Shabab		Shamim Ara, Darpan, Deeba, Naeem Hashmi		
Shadi		Chitra, Deep, Naseema		
Shatranj		Rani, Habib, Saqi		
Shikari		Shamim Ara, Darpan, Rukhsana, Naeem Hashmi		
Shukriya		Rukhsana, Habib, Nasira		
Tanha		Shamim Ara, Haroon, Neena		
Tauba	S. A. Hafiz	Zeba, Syed Kamal, Kumar, Lehri, Talish	Musical; Drama	Released on 15 February 1964, with many super-hit film songs by music director A. Hameed.
Wah Bhai Wah		Laila, Akmal, Yousuf Khan		
Yeh Bhi Ek Kahani		Chitra, Haroon, Hinna		
1965
Aisa Bhi Hota Hai	Fazal Karim Fazli	Zeba, Kamaal, Saloni, Nirala	Musical	Released on 3 February 1965. This film had one mega-hit film song by Noor Jehan, music by Nisar Bazmi and film song lyrics by Fazal Ahmad Karim Fazli.
Aakhri Station		Rani, Haroon, Shabnum		
Arzoo		Trannum, Hanif, Talat		
Aurat		Rani, Habib, Firdous, Talish		
Azmat-e-Islam	Naeem Hashmi	Sawarn Lata, Habib, Shamim, Naeem Hashmi		
Bahu Begum	Wazir Ali	Sabira, Waheed Murad, Nasira		
Chhoti Si Duniya		Laila, Habib, Allauddin		
Dil Ke Tukre		Shamim Ara, Habib, Mohammad Ali		
Devdas		Shamim Ara, Habib, Talish		
Eid Mubarak	S. M. Yusuf	Zeba, Waheed Murad, Habib, Rukhsana	Romance film	Superb music by A. Hameed.
Hazar Dastaan		Rani, Mohammad Ali, Asad		
Ishq-e-Habib		Talat, Ibrahim Nafees, Tarana		
Kaneez	Hassan Tariq	Zeba, Waheed Murad, Mohammad Ali, Sabiha Khanum, Santosh Kumar, Lehri, Talish	Drama	Released on 26 November 1965, with music by Khalil Ahmed.
Khota Paisa		Saloni, Mohammad Ali, Nasira		
Koh-e-Qaaf		Laila, Darpan, Diljeet Mirza		
Lal Roomal		Naghma, Asad, Mazhar Shah		
Mujahid		Sabira, Mohammad Ali, Aslam Pervaiz		There was a super-hit national song 'Quomi Naghma' in Masood Rana and Shaukat Ali's voices in this film that is still popular in 2015. Music by Khalil Ahmed, written by Himayat Ali Shair.
Naache Nagan Baje Been		Rani, Mohammad Ali, Saloni		
Naila	Sharif Nayyar	Shamim Ara, Santosh, Darpan, Gul Rukh, Ragni	Musical; Romance	Released on 29 October 1965. The story is based on a novel by Razia Butt. A super-hit musical film by music director Master Inayat Hussain. A landmark film of Pakistan in terms of box-office success.
Rewaaj		Zeba, Mohammad Ali, Deeba		TV artist Qavi's film debut
Sartaaj	Munshi Dil	Deeba, Syed Kamal, Aslam Pervaiz	Drama	It had a hit film Naat by music director Safdar Hussain.
Saz-o-Awaz		Rani, Waheed Murad, Rangeela		
Shabnam		Rani, Kamaal, Mohd Ali		
Tamasha		Husna, Sultan, Nazar		
Tere Shehar Mein		Zeba, Allauddin, Ajmal		
Zamin	Wazir Ali	Deeba, Allauddin, Asad	Drama	It had a super-hit film song by Mehdi Hassan, music by Wazir Afzal..."Shikwa Na Kar, Gila Na Kar". Song was written by Mushir Kazmi.
1966
Aadil		Saloni, Mohammad Ali, Adeeb		Music by Nisar Bazmi.
Aag Ka Darya	Hamayun Mirza	Shamim Ara, Mohammad Ali, Nasira, Lehri	Drama	Released on 24 January 1966. A hit musical film with music by Ghulam Nabi-Abdul Latif and film song lyrics by Josh Malihabadi including one inspiring 'Quomi Naghma'.
Aaina	Shabab Keranwi	Deeba, Mohammad Ali, Zeenat, Kamaal Irani	Musical	Released on 2 December 1966. Hit music and film songs by Manzoor Ashraf team.
Armaan	Pervez Malik	Zeba, Waheed Murad, Nirala, Tarannum	Drama	Released on 18 March 1966. It was a super-hit musical film with music by Sohail Rana, film song lyrics by Masroor Anwar.
Badnaam	Iqbal Shehzad	Neelo, Ejaz Durrani, Nabeela, Diljeet Mirza	Drama	Released on 2 September 1966. Based on a famous short story "Jhumkay" by Urdu writer Saadat Hassan Manto. A super-hit 'Mujra' song sung by Surayya Multanikar, lyrics by Masroor Anwar, music by Deebo Bhattacharya.
Bhai Jan		Rani, Mohammad Ali		
Bhayya		Chitra, Waheed Murad, Akbar		
Hamrahi	Raja Hafeez	Hina, Santosh Kumar, Mohammad Ali	Drama	Released on 6 May 1966. The film story is about two disabled persons and their friendship. Hit music and film songs by Tassaduq Hussain.
Hum Dono		Deeba, Syed Kamal		Music by Nashad and a super-hit film song by Runa Laila.
Jaag Utha Insan		Zeba, Waheed Murad, Mohammad Ali, Firdous	Romance	Super-hit music by Lal Mohammad Iqbal
Jalwah	Younis Rahi	Shamim Ara, Darpan, Ejaz, Saloni	Musical	Released on 27 June 1966
Janbaaz		Shirin, Mohammad Ali		
Koh-e-Noor		Zeba, Sudhir, Ilyas Kashmiri		Film actress Sangeeta's film debut
Kaun Kisi Ka		Husna, Syed Kamal, Talat Siddiqi		
Lori	S. Suleman	Zeba, Santosh Kumar, Mohammad Ali, Saloni, Talat Siddiqui	Musical	Released on 14 November 1966, with hit music by Khalil Ahmed and a memorable 'Lori Song' by the singer Sorayya Hyderabadi, lyrics by Himayat Ali Shair. A Golden Jubilee film of 1966.
Maa, Bahu Aur Beta		Husna, Santosh		
Madr-e-Watan	Saifudin Saif	Mohammad Ali, Zeenat Begum, Deeba, Naeem Hashmi	Biography; Drama	
Majboor		Shamim Ara, Santosh, Husna		
Mera Salaam		Sabira, Santosh		
Mere Mehboob	Al-Hamid	Shamim Ara, Darpan	Musical	Released on 2 September 1966
Moajzah		Deeba, Habib		
Pardah		Shamim Ara, Habib		
Parwana		Naseema, Hassan Imam		
Payal Ki Jhankar	Najm Naqvi	Neelo, Darpan, Deeba, Nazar, Aslam, Talish	Musical	Released on 18 November 1966
Ruswai		Deeba, Habib		
Sarhad		Husna, Ejaz, Saloni, Allauddin		
Sawaal	Hassan Tariq	Sabiha, Santosh, Siloni, Ejaz, Rangeela, Sawarn Lata, Nazir	Musical; Drama	Released on 6 May 1966. Hit music by Rasheed Attre, film song lyrics by Fayyaz Hashmi.
Watan Ka Sipahi		Firdous, Mohammad Ali, Nanha		TV actor Rafi Khawar (Nanha)'s film debut
1967
Chakori	Ehtesham	Nadeem; Shabana	Drama	Released on 23 March 1967. Nadeem's film debut as an actor. Music and super-hit film songs by Robin Ghosh.
Ehsaan	Pervaiz Malik	Zeba, Waheed Murad, Nirala, Ibrahim Nafees, Rozina, Azad	Drama	Music by Sohail Rana
Rishta Hai Pyar Ka	Qamar Zaidi	Waheed Murad, Zeba		The first film shot in UK, France, Italy and Lebanon
Zinda Laash	Khwaja Sarfraz	Asad Bukhari, Habib, Deeba, Rehan	Horror	The first film in Pakistan to be X-rated
Insaniyat	Shabab Kiranvi	Zeba, Waheed Murad, Tariq Aziz, Nanha, Firdous	Romance; Drama	Music by M. Ashraf, lyrics by Nazim Panipati and Khawaja Pervez.A Golden Jubilee musical hit film of 1967.
Doraha	Pervez Malik	Shamim Ara, Waheed Murad, Deeba Begum, Talish	Romance, Drama	This film did an 'average' amount of business at the box-office but had many super-hit film songs with superb music by Sohail Rana.
1968
Behan Bhai				
Saiqa				A super-hit film song by music director Nisar Bazmi in the voice of Mehdi Hassan, song written by Masroor Anwar. First film produced by Shamim Ara.
1969
Andaleeb	Fareed Ahmed	Shabnam, Waheed Murad, Lehri, Aaliya, Mustafa Qureshi, Talish	Romance film	Music by Nisar Bazmi, film songs written by Masroor Anwar and Kaleem Usmani. Two super-hit film songs.
Diya Aur Toofan	Rangeela	Naghma, Ejaz Durrani, Rani, Rangeela, Razia, Khalifa Nazir	Drama	A Golden Jubilee film of 1969, with music by Kamal Ahmad.
Zarqa				

== 1970s ==
Title	Director	Cast	Genre	Notes
1970
Kirdar	Younis Rathor	Younis Rathore, Ghazala	Drama	Box Office: Flop
Shahi Faqeer	Sanobar Khan	Ghazala, Masood Rana	Drama	Box Office: Flop
Ek Zalim Ek Haseena	Karigar	Shamim Ara, Azeem	Drama	Box Office: Flop. Bengali/Urdu double version.
Hamjoli	Luqman	Nayyar Sultana, Darpan	Drama	
Shama Parvana	M. Sultan	Aneela, Nazim	Romance	Box Office: Flop
Shama Aur Parwana	Hassan Tariq	Rani, Nadeem	Drama	Box Office: Average
Anjan	Munawar Rasheed	Allaudin, Zeba	Drama	Box Office: Flop
Mujrim Kon	Aslam Dar	Rozina, Sultan Rah	Drama	
Afsana	Luqman	Deeba, Waheed Murad	Romance, Musical	Box Office: Average
Honeymoon	Kemal	Husna, Kemal	Romance, Musical	Box Office: Average
Aakhri Chattan	Aslam Dar	Rani, Nasrullah Butt	Muslim-Mangol conflict	Box Office: Hit
Maina	Zahir Raihan	Kaburi, Razzak	Romance	Box Office: Flop
BeWafa	S. Suleman	Shamim Ara, Waheed Murad	Romance	Box Office: Average
Takht Aur Taj	Saeed Butt	Saloni, Saleem Butt	Costume film	Box Office: Flop
Yeh Rastay Hayn Pyar Kay	Sarwar Khayal	Aliya, Habib	Romance	Box Office: Flop
Aansoo Ban Gaye Moti	M. A. Rasheed	Shamim Ara, Mohammad Ali	Drama	Box Office: Average
Naseeb Apna Apna	Qamar Zaidi	Shabnam, Waheed Murad	Romance, Musical	Box Office: Hit
Parai Beti	Kemal	Rozina, Kemal	Drama	Box Office: Flop
Bazi	Iqbal Shehzad	Nisho, Nadeem	Romance	Box Office: Hit
Jhuk Geya Aasman	Sheikh Hassan	Tarannum, Moodi	Drama	Box Office: Flop
Neya Savera	Jameel Akhtar	Shabnam, Ejaz	Political	Box Office: Flop
Reshma	Dawood Chand	Saloni, Sudhir	Action	Box Office: Flop
Insan Aur Aadmi	Shabab Keranvi	Meera, Saud	Drama	Box Office: Super Hit. Asiya's debut film.
BeQasoor	Haidar Chodhary	Deeba, Mohammad Ali	Drama	Box Office: Average
Chalo Maan Gaye	Rehman	Shabnam, Rehman	Drama	Box Office: Flop
Payel	Mustafeez	Shabana, Razzak	Romance	Box Office: Flop. Bengali/Urdu double version.
Noreen	Laiq Akhtar	Zeba, Mohammad Ali	Drama	Box Office: Average
Darinda	Shaukat Hashmi	Aliya, Tailsh	Drama	Box Office: Flop
Dyar-e-Peghambran	?	?	Religious	
Bedardi	Ahmad Qureshi	Saloni, Syed Kemal	Drama	Box Office: Flop
Love in Jungle	Akbar Ali Akkoo	Gul Hameed, Aliya	Romance	Box Office: Flop. Bengali/Urdu double version.
Jalay Na Kyun Parwana	Shaukat Hashmi	Shabnam, Syed Kemal	Romance	Box Office: Average
Love in Europe	Jameel Akhtar	Rozina, Syed Kemal	Romance	Box Office: Flop
Mohabbat Rang Laye Gi	S. Suleman	Zeba, Mohammad Ali	Romance	Box Office: Flop
Anjuman	Hassan Tariq	Rani, Waheed Murad	Drama, Musical	Box Office: Super Hit
Humlog	Wazir Ali	Jugnu, Master Murad	Drama	Box Office: Average
Mr. 420	Ismael Gilani	Rani, Iqbal Yousuf	Action	Box Office: Flop
Najma	Masood Parvez	Zeba, Mohammad Ali	Drama	Box Office: Average
Rangeela	Rangeela	Nisho, Rangeela	Drama, Musical	Box Office: Super Hit
2 Baghi	M. Naseem	Syed Kemal, Lehri	Patriotic	Box Office: Flop
Phir Chand Niklay Ga	Rafiq Rizvi	Deeba, Waheed Murad	Drama	Box Office: Flop
Ek Phool Ek Pathar	S. Suleman	Zeba, Mohammad Ali	Drama	Box Office: Average
Aashna	Suroor Barabankvi	Sumbal, Saleem	Drama	Box Office: Flop
Sougat	Parvez Malik	Rozina, Nadeem	Drama	Box Office: Average
Chand Suraj	Shore Lakhnavi	Rozina, Waheed Murad	Romance, Musical	Box Office: Average
Road to Swat	Munawar Rasheed	Naseema Khan, Syed Kemal	Romance	Box Office: Average
1971
Garhasti	Nazar Shabab	Sahiba Khanum, Sangeeta	Drama	
Neend Hamari Khwab Tumhare	K. Khursheed	Deeba, Waheed Murad	Romance, Musical	Box Office: Hit
Meharban	Zahir Raihan	Shabana, Razzak	Drama	Box Office: Flop
Night Club	Iqbal Yousuf	Shamim Ara, Syed Kemal	Drama	Box Office: Flop
Rim Jhim	Qamar Zaidi	Deeba, Waheed Murad	Drama	Box Office: Flop
Dosti	Sharif Nayyar	Shabnam, Ejaz	Overseas	Box Office: Super Hit
Dunya Na Manay	Luqman	Zeba, Mohammad Ali	Drama	Box Office: Average
Mera Dil Meri Aarzoo	Raja Hafeez	Deeba, Yousuf Khan	Drama	
Operation Karachi	M. R. Faze	Tarana, Raza Fazli	Romance, Musical	Box Office: Average
Mr. 303	Aslam Dar	Rani, Nasrullah Butt	Action	Box Office: Average
Afshan	Javed Hashmi	Shabnam, Waheed Murad	Romance, Musical	Box Office: Average
Yaaden	Aziz Meeruti	Zeba, Mohammad Ali	Drama	
Teri Soorat Meri Ankhen	S. Suleman	Zeba, Mohammad Ali	Drama	Box Office: Hit
Insaf Aur Qanoon	Shabab Keranvu	Zeba, Mohammad Ali	Drama	Box Office: Hit
Parai Aag	Raza Mir	Shamim Ara, Nadeem	Drama	Box Office: Flop
Gharnata	Riaz Shahid	Rozina, Yousuf Khan	Political	Box Office: Average. Based on the fall of the Muslim region Granada.
Rootha Na Karo	Munawar Rasheed	Shabnam, Syed Kemal	Romance	
Khamosh Nigahen	Jamal Akhtar	Rozina, Waheed Murad	Overseas	Box Office: Flop
Roop Behroop	Habibur Rahman	Nisho, Syed Kemal	Romance	
Sukhi Lutera	Aslam Dar	Rani, Nasrullah Butt	Action	
Wehshi	Hassan Tariq	Shamim Ara, Mohammad Ali	Drama	Box Office: Hit
Aansoo	S. A. Bukhari	Deeba, Nadeem	Drama	Box Office: Super Hit
Salam-e-Mohabbaf	S. T. Zaidi	Zeba, Mohammad Ali	Romance, Musical	Box Office: Average
Ek Sapera	Iqbal Yousuf	Aliya, Iqbal Yousuf	Drama	Box Office: Flop
Jaltay Suraj Ke Neechay	Rehman	Rozina, Nadeem	Drama	Box Office: Flop. Nadeem plays a triple role.
Charagh Kahan Roshni Kahan	K. Khursheed	Shabnam, Nadeem	Romance, Musical	Box Office: Hit
Aansoo Bahaye Pathron Ne	Zafar Shabab	Zeba, Mohammad Ali	Drama	
Dil Aur Dunya	Rangeela	Asiya, Habib	Drama	Box Office: Super Hit
Al-Asifa	Riaz Ahmad	Naghma, Sudhir	Political	Box Office: Flop
Khak Aur Khoon	Hamayun Mirza	Shamim Ara, Mohammad Ali	Action	Box Office: Average
Tehzeeb	Hassan Tariq	Rani, Shahid	Drama, Musical	Box Office: Super Hit
Yeh Aman	Riaz Shahid	Nisho, Jameel	Political	Box Office: Average
1972
Afsana Zindagi Ka	Shabab Keranvi	Zeba, Mohammad Ali	Drama	Box Office: Hit
Meray Humsafar	Parvez Malik	Shabnam, Mohammad Ali	Spy	Box Office: Super Hit
Khalish	Laiq Akhtar	Rani, Waheed Murad	Drama	Box Office: Hit
Janwar	Arif Khan	Chakori, Badar Munir	Drama	
Badguman	Ejaz Chodhary	Tarannum, Habib	Drama	
Hill Station	Iqbal Yousuf	Shamim Ara, Waheed Murad	Drama	Box Office: Flop
Ilzam	S. Suleman	Zeba, Mohammad Ali	Drama	Box Office: Average
Pardes	Saqlain Rizvi	Deeba, Habib	Drama	Box Office: Average
Baazar	Shabab Keranvi	Nisho, Sangeeta	Drama	Box Office: Average
Naag Muni	Raza Mir	Rani, Waheed Murad	Romance, Musical	Box Office: Average
Aazadi	Akbar Ali Akkoo	Rani, Nasrullah Butt	Drama	
Badlay Gi Dunya Sathi	S. T. Zaidi	Zeba, Mohammad Ali	Drama	
Doulat Aur Dunya	Khalifa Saeed Ahmad	Rozina, Waheed Murad	Drama	Box Office: Hit
Mere Mohabbat Tere Hawale	Rangeela	Deeba, Nazim	Romance	
Aao Pyar Karen	K. Khursheed	Deeba, Nadeem	Drama	Box Office: Average
Soudagar	Akbar Ali Akkoo	Rani, Adil	Drama	
Aakhri Hamla	Habib-ur-Rahman	Shaista Qaiser, Syed Kemal	Drama	
Mohabbat	S. Suleman	Zeba, Mohammad Ali	Romance, Musical	Box Office: Average
Bandagi	Farid Ahmad	Shabnam, Waheed Murad	Romance, Musical	
Main Akela	Asad Bukhari	Asiua, Shahid	Drama	Box Office: Average
Meri Zindagi Hai Naghma	Shevan Rizvi	Sangeeta, Rangeela	Romance, Musical	Box Office: Super Hit
Dil Ek Aaina	Shabab Keranvi	Mohammad Ali, Shaista Qaiser	Drama	Box Office: Average
Kon Apna Kon Paraya	Latif Shahid	Habib, Rukhsana	Drama	
Baharo Phool Barsao	M. Sadiq	Rani, Waheed Murad	Romance, Musical	Box Office: Super Hit
Main Bhi Toh Insan Hoon	Zafar Shabab	Asiya, Shahid	Drama	
Sipah Salar	Agha Hussaini	Santosh, Saloni	Drama	
Zindagi Ek Safar Hai	S. M. Yousuf	Shamim Ara, Waheed Murad	Drama	Box Office: Hit
Ek Raat	Jameel Akhtar	Deeba, Shahid	Romance, Musical	Box Office: Hit
Angarey	Farid Ahmad	Nadeem, Shamim Ara	Drama	Box Office: Average
Zindagi Kay Mela	Hussain Nasir	Zamurrad, Hameed Chodhary	Drama	Box Office: Flop
Jahan Barf Girti Hai	Nasir Hussain	Yasmin Khan, Badar Munir	Drama	
Suhag	Farid Ahmad	Shamim Ara, Nadeem	Drama	Box Office: Flop
Gata Jaye Banjara	Sheikh Hassan	Rangeela	Drama	
Mann Ki Jeet	Shabab Keranvi	Shabnam, Nadeem	Drama	Box Office: Average
Pazeb	R.A. Rakhan	Asiya, Nadeem	Romance	Box Office: Flop
Sabaq	S. Suleman	Zeba, Mohammad Ali	Drama	Box Office: Super-Hit
Ehsaas	Nazrul Islam	Nadeem, Shabnam	Romance, Musical	Box Office: Average
Umrao Jaan Ada	Hassan Tariq	Rani, Shahid	Romance, Musical	Box Office: Super Hit
1973
Mr. Budhu	S. T. Zaidi	Rangeela, Deeba	Comedy	
Farz	Laiq Akhtar	Shamim Ara, Syed Kemal	Drama	Box Office: Average
Sarhad Ki Goud Mein	M. A. Rasheed	Firdous, Mohammad Ali	Action	Box Office: Average
Zarq Khan	Aslam Dar	Aliya, Sultan Rahi	Action	Box Office: Hit
Nadan	Iqbal Akhtar	Nisho, Nadeem	Drama, Musical	Box Office: Super Hit
Aar Par	Iqbal Shehzad	Nisho, Shahid	Drama	
Gharana	K. Khursheed	Shabnam, Mohammad Ali	Romance, Musical	Box Office: Super Hit
Mastana	Al-Hamid	Asiya, Khalifa Nazir	Drama	
Sehray Kay Phool	R. A. Rakhan	Nisho, Nadeem	Romance, Musical	Box Office: Average
Mulaqat	Laiq Akhtar	Nisho, Waheed Murad	Romance, Musical	Box Office: Average
Parday Mein Rehnay Do	Shabab Keranvi	Saiqa, Munawar Zarif	Comedy, Musical	Box Office: Super Hit
Badal Aur Bijli	Khalifa Saeed Ahmad	Shabnam, Nadeem	Romance, Musical	Box Office: Average
Dil Ka Shehar	Aziz-ul-Hassan	Sangeeta, Shahid	Drama	
Khawab Aur Zindagi	Farid Ahmad	Shamim Ara, Waheed Murad	Romance, Musical	
Professor	Akbar Ali Akkoo	Rozina	Drama	Box Office: Flop
Pyasa	Hassan Tariq	Rani, Shahid	Drama	
Azmat	Darpan	Darpan, Rozina	Drama	
Naam Kay Nawab	Nazar Sufi	Shabnam, Syed Kemal	Drama	
Neya Rasta	Zafar Shabab	Shabnam, Mohammad Ali	Drama	Box Office: Average
Aas	Ali Sufiyan Afaqi	Shabnam, Mohammad Ali	Romance, Musical	Box Office: Hit
BeImaan	Syed Tayyab Hussain Rizvi	Asiya, Rangeela	Comedy	Box Office: Average
Anmol	Parvez Malik	Shahid, Shabnam	Drama	Box Office: Super Hit
Dulhan Rani	Naushad	Nisho, Nazim	Drama	
Insan Aur Gadha	Syed Kemal	Rozina, Rangeela	Political	Box Office: Average
Jaal	Iftikhar Khan	Nisho, Waheed Murad	Romance	Box Office: Average
Zakhmi	Fyaz Sheikh	Shabnam, Mohammad Ali	Drama	
Sadhu Aur Sheitan	Jahangir Bhatti	Rozina, Sultan Rahi	Drama	
Daman Aur Chingari	Shabab Keranvi	Nadeem, Mohammad Ali	Drama	Box Office: Super Hit
Kubra Ashiq	Rangeela	Nisho, Rangeela	Drama	Box Office: Flop
Society	S. Suleman	Shabnam, Nadeem	Drama	Box Office: Hit
Albeli	Ghulam Haydar	Ishrat Chaudhry	Drama	
Ek Thi Larki	Sharif Nayyar, Hassan Tariq, Ehtesham	Shahid, Rani	Drama	Box Office: Flop
Bhaagi Haseena	Zia Hashmi	Aliya, Iqbal Hassan	Action	
Rangeela Aur Munawar Zarif	Nazar Shabab	Rangeela, Munawar Zarif	Comedy	Box Office: Hit
Teray Gham Rahay Slamat	S. Suleman	Nisho, Shahid	Romance	Box Office: Flop
Anhoni	Iqbal Akhtar	Aliya, Waheed Murad	Romance	Box Office: Average
Baharon Ki Manzil	S. Suleman	Sangeeta, Shahid	Romance, Musical	
Nadiya Kay Paar	S. A. Faiz	Zeba, Mohammad Ali	Romance	
1974
Do Badan	Razzaq Khan	Shabnam, Nadeem	Drama	Box Office: Hit. Kaveeta's debut film.
Samaj	Jafar Bukhari	Nisho, Mohammad Ali	Drama	Box Office: Hit
Allah Meri Touba	S. A. Hafiz	Rozina, Shahid	Drama	
Bano Rani	K. Khursheed	Shabnam, Mohammad Ali	Drama	Box Office: Hit
Pyar Hi Pyar	Rafiq Ali Rakhan	Asiya, Waheed Murad	Romance	Was produced by Asiya herself.
Dillagi	Aslam Dar	Shabnam, Nadeem	Romance, Musical	Box Office: Super Hit
Mitti Ke Putlay	Ehtesham	Nisho, Nadeem	Drama	Box Office: Flop
Dunya Gol Hai	Qadeer Ghori	Saiqa, Rangeela	Drama	
Parchhaen	Luqman	Zeba, Mohammad Ali	Drama	Box Office: Flop. Based on the story Eva and Caroline.
Main Bani Dulhan	S. A. Bukhari	Shabnam, Shahid	Drama	
Baat Ponchi Teri Jawani Tak	Shevan Rizvi	Sangeeta, Rangeela	Drama	
Tiger Gang	Harald Reinl (Italy), Iqbal Shehzad	Zeba, Mohammad Ali	Co-production	
Aabroo	Ali Sufiyan Afaqi	Shabnam, Mohammad Ali	Drama	Box Office: Hit
Tum Salamat Raho	M. A. Rasheed	Asiya, Waheed Murad	Drama, Musical	Box Office: Hit
Subah Ka Tara	Rangeela	Rangeela, Sangeeta	Drama	
Chahat	Rehman	Shabnam, Rehman	Drama	Box Office: Hit
Pathar Kay Sanam	Sh. Maqbool	Sangeeta	Drama	
Kei Saal Pehlay	M. Dilawar	Altaf Khan, Sultan Rahi	Drama	Box Office: Flop
Parda Na Uthao	Iqbal Akhtar	Nisho, Shahid	Drama	Box Office: Hit
Watan	Ilyas Kashmiri	Waheed Gul	Drama	
Aaina Aur Soorat	Shabab Keranvi	Shabnam, Mohammad Ali	Drama	Box Office: Super Hit
Dil Walay	Ibrahim Nafees	Yasmin Khan, Badar Munir	Drama	
Namak Harram	Ali Sufyan Afaqi	Munawar Zarif, Nisho	Drama	
Phool Meray Gulshan Ka	Iqbal Akhtar	Zeba, Mohammad Ali	Drama, Musical	Box Office: Super Hit
Sacha Jhoota	Zafar Shabab	Saiqa, Rangeela	Comedy	
Sawan Aaya Tum Nahin Ayee	Akhtar Yousuf	Shabnam, Nadeem	Romance	Box Office: Flop
Imandar	Syed Tayyab Hussain Rizvi	Deeba, Rangeela	Drama	Box Office: Average
Intezar	S. Suleman	Nadeem, Shabnam	Drama	Box Office: Hit. Babra Sharif's debut film.
Sharafat	Nazrul Islam	Nadeem, Shabnam	Drama	Box Office: Hit
Mastani Mehbooba	Laiq Akhtar	Sangeeta, Waheed Murad	Drama	
Neelam	Iqbal Kashmiri	Asiya, Shahid	Drama	
Shikar	S. A. Hafiz	Shahid, Mumtaz	Action	Box Office: Average
Tum Sa Nahin Dekha	Yousuf Nasar	Sangeeta, Qazi Wajid	Romance	
Usay Dekha Usay Chaha	Parvez Malik	Rozina, Waheed Murad	Romance	Box Office: Flop
Jawab Do	Jafar Bukhari	Zamurrad, Darpan	Drama	
Laila Majnu	Hassan Tariq	Rani, Waheed Murad	Tragedy, Romance	
Miss Hippy	S. Suleman	Shabnam, Nadeem	Drama	Box Office: Average
Nanha Farishta	K. Khursheed	Mohammad Ali, Deeba	Drama	Box Office: Average
Bhool	S. Suleman	Shabnam, Nadeem	Drama	Box Office: Hit
Haqeeqat	Rafiq Rizvi	Waheed Murad, Babra Sharif	Drama	Box Office: Hit
Dushman	Parvez Malik	Waheed Murad, Mumtaz	Action, Romance	Box Office: Hit
Deedar	Hassan Tariq	Rani, Waheed Murad	Romance, Musical	Box Office: Average
Shehar Aur Saye	Zia Sarhadi	Shaista Qaiser	Drama	
2 Tasviren	Sabtain Fazli	Shabnam, Nadeem	Romance	Box Office: Disaster
Bahisht	Hassan Tariq	Nisho, Nadeem	Drama	Box Office: Average
Qismat	Zafar Shabab	Shabnam, Mohammad Ali	Drama	Box Office: Hit
Chakkarbaz	S. Jamsheri	Sangeeta, Shahid	Drama	
Dhamaka	S. T. Zaidi	Javed Sheikh, Shabnam	Drama	Javed Sheikh's debut
Shama	Nazar Shabab	Iram Hassan, Nadeem	Romance, Musical	Box Office: Super Hit
1975
Izzat	Jafar Bukhari	Neelo, Waheed Murad	Drama	Box Office: Average
Saajan Rang Rangeela	Sanobar Khan	Rangeela, Deeba	Drama	Box Office: Flop
Farz Aur Mamta	K. Khursheed	Shabnam, Nadeem	Drama	Box Office: Flop
BeMisal	Shabab Keranvi	Shabnam, Mohammad Ali	Drama	Box Office: Average
Bin Badal Barsaat	Zeenat	Zeba, Mohammad Ali	Drama	Box Office: Hit
Na Chura Sakoge Daaman	Nazar Shabab	Rangeela, Saiqa	Drama	
Haar Gaya Insan	S. M. Yousuf	Mumtaz, Nadeem	Drama	Box Office: Average
Paisa	M. A. Ali	Shabnam, Mohammad Ali	Drama	Box Office: Average
Pyar Ka Mousam	Mumawar Rasheed	Munawar Zarif, Mumtaz	Romance, Musical	Box Office: Hit
Aarzoo	Raza Mir	Zeba, Mohammad Ali	Romance, Musical	Box Office: Hit
Jageer	Ali Sufiyan Afaqi	Shabnam, Nadeem	Drama	Box Office: Flop
Sindbad	Iqbal Kashmiri	Sangeeta, Shahid	Mystery	
Milap	Agha Riaz Gul	Shabnam, Mohammad Ali	Drama	
Shirin Farhad	Sharif Nayyar	Zeba, Mohammad Ali	Folk	Box Office: Average
Teray Meray Sapnay	Iqbal Rizvi	Mohammad Ali, Sangeeta	Romance, Musical	Box Office: Super Hit
Zeenat	S. Suleman	Shabnam, Nadeem	Drama	Box Office: Hit
Mohabbat Zindagi Hai	Iqbal Akhtar	Zeba, Mohammad Ali	Romance, Musical	Box Office: Hit
Moashra	Jafar Bukhari	Sangeeta, Mohammad Ali	Drama	Box Office: Flop
Shikwa	Zafar Shabab	Deeba, Mohammad Ali	Drama	Box Office: Average
2 Sathi	Rehman	Shabnam, Rehman	Romance, Musical	Box Office: Average
Gumrah	S. Suleman	Zeba, Mohammad Ali	Drama	Box Office: Flop
Eisar	Laiq Akhtar	Zeba, Mohammad Ali	Drama	Box Office: Average
Dil Nasheen	Iqbal Akhtar	Shabnam, Nadeem	Romance, Musical	Box Office: Average
Aik Gunnah Aur Sahi	Hassan Tariq	Rani, Mohammad Ali	Drama	Box Office: Super Hit
Anari	S. Suleman	Shabnam, Nadeem	Drama	Box Office: Super Hit
Pehchan	Parvez Malik	Shabnam, Nadeem	Drama	Box Office: Super Hit
Mera Naam Hai Mohabbat	Shabab Keranvi	Babra Sharif, Ghulam Mohayuddin	Romance, Musical	Box Office: Super Hit
Professor	Razar Mir	Mohammad Ali, Nisho	Drama	
Palki	Qamar Zaidi	Zeba, Mohammad Ali	Drama	Box Office: Average
Bikhray Moti	Kaifee	Shabnam, Mohammad Ali	Drama	Box Office: Average
Neiki Badi	Qadeer Ghori	Nisho, Shahid	Drama	
Dilruba	Hassan Tariq	Rani, Waheed Murad	Musical	
Ganwar	Rangeela	Sangeeta, Rangeela	Drama	
Soorat Aur Seerat	Iqbal Yousuf	Sudhir, Mumtaz	Action	Box Office: Super Hit
Shararat	S. Suleman	Mumtaz, Ghulam Mohayuddin	Drama	Box Office: Average
Allah-o-Akbar	Rafiq Chamman	?	Religious	Box Office: Flop
Haiwan	S. A. Hafiz	Aliya, Shahid	Drama	Box Office: Average
Ajnabi	Ali Sufiyan Afaqi	Mohammad Ali, Deeba	Drama	
Roshni	Qavi	Nisho, Nadeem	Drama	Box Office: Average
Jab Jab Phool Khile	Iqbal Akhtar	Zeba, Mohammad Ali	Drama, Musical	Box Office: Super Hit
Umang	K. Khursheed	Shabnam, Nadeem	Romance	Box Office: Average
Badal Gaya Insan	Haidar	Shabnam, Mohammad Ali	Drama	
Neik Parveen	S. M. Yousuf	Nisho, Mohammad Ali	Drama	Box Office: Average
Dulhan Ek Raat Ki	Mumtaz Ali Khan	Badar Munir, Nimmi	Action	Box Office: Super Hit. Urdu/Pashto double version.
Noukar	Nazar Shabab	Zeba, Mohammad Ali	Drama	Box Office: Super Hit
Zanjeer	S. Suleman	Nadeem, Shabnam	Drama	Box Office: Average
Masoom	Wazir Ali	Babra Sharif, Afzaal Ahmad	Drama	Box Office: Super Hit
1976
Zubaida	Aslam Dar	Nisho, Waheed Murad	Romance, Musical	Box Office: Average
Talash	Parvez Malik	Nadeem, Shabnam	Drama	Box Office: Super Hit
Raja Jani	S. A. Haifz	Shabnam, Mohammad Ali	Drama	Box Office: Average
Insan Aur Farishta	Shabab Keranvi	Deeba, Nadeem	Drama	Box Office: Average
Mom Ki Gudiya	S. Suleman	Shabnam, Ghulam Mohayuddin	Drama	
Rastay Ka Pathar	M. A. Rasheed	Nisho, Waheed Murad	Drama, Musical	
Deewar	Shabab Keranvi	Babra Sharif, Ghulam Mohayuddin	Drama	
Aag Aur Aansoo	Ali Sufiyan Afqi	Deeba, Mohammad Ali	Drama	
Koshish	Iqbal Akhtar	Mumtaz, Nadeem	Drama	Box Office: Hit
Aurat Ek Paheli	Jafar Bukhari	Zeba, Mohammad Ali	Drama	Box Office: Average
Naag Aur Nagin	Hassan Tariq	Rani, Waheed Murad	Drama	
Aaj Aur Kal	S. Suleman	Shabnam, Rahat Kazmi	Drama	Box Office: Super Hit
Daagh	K. Khursheed	Shabnam, Mohammad Ali	Drama	
Aulad	Hassan Tariq	Rani, Shahid	Drama	
Society Girl	Sangeeta	Ghulam Mohayuddin, Sangeeta	Romance, Musical	Box Office: Hit. Sangeeta's debut as a director. The film made her one of the most successful directors in her time.
Daaman Ki Aag	Zafar Shabab	Shabnam, Mohammad Ali	Drama	Box Office: Flop
Waqt	Zafar Shabab	Babra Sharif, Waheed Murad	Drama	Box Office: Average
Talaq	S. Suleman	Shahid, Shabnam	Drama	Box Office: Average
Mehboob Mera Mastana	Saqlain Rizvi	Asiya, Waheed Murad	Drama	Box Office: Disaster
Waada	Aslam Dar	Asiya, Waheed Murad	Romance, Musical	Box Office: Average
Saiyan Anari	Aslam Dar	Shabnam, Nadeem	Drama	Box Office: Average
Dekha Jaye Ga	Jan Mohammad	Babra Sharif, Shahid	Drama	Box Office: Hit
Kharidar	Jamshed Naqvi	Mumtaz, Waheed Murad	Drama	
Zaib-un-Nisa	Fareed Ahmed	Shamim Ara, Waheed Murad	Anti-British-Raj	
2 Aansoo	S. A. Bukhari	Shabnam, Nadeem	Drama	Box Office: Average
Sachai	Parvez Malik	Shabnam, Nadeem	Drama	Box Office: Hit
Surayya Bhoopali	Hassan Tariq	Shahid, Rani	Romance, Musical	
Meri Dushmani	Mumtaz Ali Khan	Badar Munir, Musarrat Shaheen	Action	Urdu/Pashto double version
Anokhi	K. Khursheed	Shabnam	Drama	
Aansoo Aur Sholay	S. A. Haifz	Babra Sharif, Ghulam Mohayuddin	Drama	Box Office: Average
Mohabbat Aur Mehngai	Iqbal Rizvi	Kaveeta, Nadeem	Romance	Box Office: Hit
Sazish	Afzal Khan	Usman Pirzada	Drama	
Ann Daata	Iqbal Yousuf	Sudhir, Mohammad Ali	Drama	Box Office: Super Hit
Nasheman	Shabab Keranvi	Babra Sharif, Mohammad Ali	Drama	Box Office: Average
Mohabbat Aur Dosti	Khalifa Saeed Ahmad	Najma, Shahid	Romance	Box Office: Hit
Mujhe Galay Laga Lo	Sangeeta	Kaveeta, Ghulam Mohiuddin	Drama	Box Office: Hit
Insaniyat	S. Suleman	Babra Sharif, Rahat Kazmi	Drama	
Dharkan	S. A. Haifz	Mohammad Ali, Zeba	Drama	Box Office: Average
Geo Aur Jeene Do	Shamim Ara	Mumtaz, Waheed Murad	Drama	Box Office: Flop
Shabana	Nazar Shabab	Waheed Murad, Babra Sharif	Drama, Musical	Box Office: Super Hit
Goonj Uthi Shehnai	S. M. Yousuf	Zeba, Mohammad Ali	Drama	Box Office: Average
Zaroorat	Hassan Tariq	Rani, Shahid	Drama	
Aap Ka Khadim	Wazir Ali	Zeba, Mohammad Ali	Drama	Box Office: Average
Inteqam Ke Sholay	Iqbal Akhtar	Badar Munir, Nimmi	Drama	Box Office: Hit
Phool Aur Sholay	Riaz Bukhari	Zeba, Mohammad Ali	Drama	Box Office: Average
Taqdeer Kahan Le Ayee	S. Suleman	Deeba, Sultan Rahi	Drama	Produced by Sultan Rahi
1977
Aawara	Altaf Hussain	Aliya, Shahid	Drama	
Beti	Zafar Shabab	Babra Sharif, Shahid	Drama	Box Office: Average
Parastish	Aziz-ul-Hassan	Mumtaz, Nadeem	Drama	Box Office: Flop
Black Cat	Baqar Rizvi	Musarrat Shaheen, Shahid	Drama	Box Office: Average
Mohabbat Ek Kahani	Shabab Keranvi	Kaveeta, Nadeem	Romance	Box Office: Hit
Qatl Ke Baad	Iqbal Rizvi	Badar Munir, Deeba	Action	
Uff Yeh Bivian	S. Suleman	Shabnam, Nadeem	Drama	Box Office: Super Hit
Aina	Nazrul Islam	Shabnam, Nadeem	Drama	Box Office: Super Hit. Had a record of completing over 400 weeks in Karachi.
April Fool	Mohammad Ikram	Asiya, Tariq Shah	Drama	
Aamna Samna	Jan Mohammad	Najma, Shahid	Drama	Box Office: Average
Begum Jaan	Hassan Tariq	Rani, Shahid	Drama	Box Office: Hit
Gora Kala	Rafiq Ali Rakhan	Nisho, Nadeem	Drama	Box Office: Flop
Jasoos	Iqbal Yousuf	Sultan Rahi, Mumtaz	Action	Box Office: Flop
Aashi	Ali Sufyan Afaqi	Babra Sharif, Shahid	Drama	Box Office: Average
Ishq Ishq	Sangeeta	Kaveeta, Nadeem	Romance	Box Office: Hit
Shama-e-Mohabbat	Shabab Keranvi	Shabnam, Shahid	Romance, Musical	Box Office: Hit
Sangam	K. Khursheed	Shabnam, Nadeem	Drama	Box Office: Hit
Cheekh	Yousuf Bhatti	Badar Munir, Shehnaz	Drama	Box Office: Flop. Pashto/Urdu double version.
Sargent	Aslam Irani	Najma, Asif Khan	Drama	Box Office: Hit
Sholay Pe Shola	Syed Ansakh Saeed	Nimmi, Talat Iqbal	Drama	Box Office: Flop. Urdu/Pashto double version.
Bharosa	Zafar Shabab	Zeba, Mohammad Ali	Drama	Box Office: Super Hit. Based on novel 'Faltu Larki'.
Dard	Iqbal Akhtar	Babra Sharif, Nadeem	Drama	Box Office: Hit
Meray Huzoor	S. Suleman	Shabnam, Shahid	Drama	
Jawani Deevani	Jan Mohammad	Babra Sharif, Shahid	Drama	
Yadon Ki Barat	Mumtaz Ali Khan	Nimmi, Yasmin Khan	Drama	
Pehli Nazar	Aslam Dar	Asiya, Babra Sharif	Drama	Box Office: Average
Insan	Masood Parvez	Shahid, Babra Sharif	Romance	
Jeenay Ki Rah	Iqbal Yousuf	Sudhir, Mohammad Ali	Drama	Box Office: Average
Shaheen	K. Khursheed	Mustafa Qureshi, Sultan Rahi	Drama	
Susral	Nazar Shabab	Sangeeta, Shahid	Drama	Box Office: Hit
Aakhri Muqabla	Khalifa Saeed Ahmad	Sultan Rahi, Najma	Action	Box Office: Average
Naya Suraj	Masood Parvez	Shabnam, Mohammad Ali	Political	
Pyar Ka Waada	S. Suleman	Shahid, Babra Sharif	Drama	Box Office: Average
Roti, Kapra, Aur Insan	Kaifee	Nadeem, Mohammad Ali	Drama	Box Office: Average
Tipu Sultan	Razzaq Qaisar	Ruhi Bano, Mohammad Ali	Historical	Box Office: Average
Baray Mian Deevane	Aslam Dar	Asiya, Nadeem	Comedy	Box Office: Average
Kalu	Hassan Tariq	Mohammad Ali, Rani	Drama	Box Office: Hit
Mohabbat Mar Nahi Sakti	Aziz-ul-Shah	Deeba, Nadeem	Romance	Box Office: Flop
Apne Hue Paraye	Iqbal Akhtar	Mumtaz, Waheed Murad	Drama	
Goonj	Mohammad Javed Fazil	Shahid, Najma	Drama	Box Office: Average
Salakhen	Hassan Askari	Mohammad Ali, Babra Sharif	Drama	Box Office: Hit
Teesri Qasam	Mumtaz Ali Khan	Nimmi, Asif Khan	Drama	Box Office: Hit
1978
Amber	Nazrul Islam	Mohammad Ali, Nadeem	Drama	Box Office: Super Hit
Ek Chehra Do Roop	Zafar Shabab	Babra Sharif, Shahid	Drama	
Dil Ke Daagh	Raza Mir	Nisho, Mohammad Ali	Drama	Box Office: Average
Jan Ki Bazi	Laiq Akhtar	Musarrat Shaheen, Badar Munir	Action	
Baap Ka Gunnah	Mukhtar Ali Khan	Nimmi, Badar Munir	Drama	
Milan	M. A. Rasheed	Mohammad Ali, Shabnam	Romance	Box Office: Hit
Aadmi	M. A. Rasheed	Sangeeta, Nisho	Drama	Box Office: Average
Saheli	Shabab Keranvi	Shabnam, Rani	Drama	Box Office: Super Hit
Aabshar	Zeenat	Shabnam, Shahid	Romance	
Aag Aur Zindagi	S. Suleman	Mohammad Ali, Mumtaz	Drama	Box Office: Average
Mera Naam Raja	Hamid Usmani	Habib, Naghma	Drama	
Kora Kagaz	M. Akram	Zeba, Mohammad Ali	Romance	Box Office: Average
Chori Mera Kam	Iqbal Kashmiri	Sultan Rahi, Najma	Action	
Parakh	Jan Mohammad	Waheed Murad, Rani	Action	Box Office: Hit
Barat	S. A. Haifz	Babra Sharif, Shahid	Drama	Box Office: Average
Kabhi Kabhi	Wazir Ali	Sangeeta, Shahid	Drama	Box Office: Hit
Sharmili	Iqbal Akhtar	Mumtaz, Nadeem	Drama	Box Office: Average
Abhi To Main Jawan Hoon	S. Suleman	Shabnam, Shahid	Comedy	
Bohot Khoob	Jan Mohammad	Najma, Shahid	Drama	Shahid played four characters.
Lad Pyar Aur Beti	Sangeeta	Sangeeta, Shahid	Drama	
Insan Aur Sheitan	Khalifa Saeed Ahmad	Najma, Waheed Murad	Drama	
Intekhab	Parvez Malik	Shabnam, Mohammad Ali	Drama	Box Office: Super Hit
Sheeshay Ka Ghar	Nazrul Islam	Waheed Murad, Shahid	Drama	
Nazrana	Nazar Shabab	Rani, Ghulam Mohayuddin	Drama	Box Office: Average
Mutthi Bhar Chawal	Sangeeta	Sangeeta, Nadeem	Drama	Box Office: Average
Ehtjaj	Farooq Qaisar	Deeba, Nisho	Drama	
Mehman	Parvez Malik	Rahat Kazmi, Babra Sharif	Drama	Box Office: Hit. Based on novel 'Chupke Se Bahar Aa Jaye'.
Prince	S. Suleman	Nadeem, Babra Sharif	Drama	Box Office: Hit
Mazi, Haal, Aur Mustaqbil	Hassan Tariq	Babra Sharif, Shahid	Drama	
Takrao	Iqbal Yousuf	Zeba, Mohammad Ali	Drama	Box Office: Hit
Accident	Haidar Chodhary	Yousuf Khan, Najma	Drama	Box Office: Average
Inqilab	Majeed Rana	Neelo, Mohammad Ali	Political	
Do Daku	Rehmat Ali	Sultan Rahi, Badar Munir	Action	Box Office: Average
Haidar Ali	Masood Parvez	Mumtaz, Mohammad Ali	Historical	Box Office: Average
Playboy	Shamim Ara	Babra Sharif, Nadeem	Drama	Box Office: Hit
Seeta Maryam Margaret	Hassan Tariq	Rani, Shahid	Drama	Box Office: Average
Zindagi	Nazrul Islam	Babra Sharif, Nadeem	Drama	Box Office: Super Hit
Dushman Ho To Aisa	Yousuf Bhatti	Kaveeta, Asif Khan	Action	
Anmol Mohabbat	Shabab Keranvi	Shabnam, Nadeem	Romance, Musical	Box Office: Average
Khuda Aur Mohabbat	Iqbal Yousuf	Rubi Bano, Babra Sharif	Romance	Box Office: Hit
Awaz	Zafar Shabab	Waheed Murad, Shabnam	Drama	Box Office: Super Hit
Hera Pheri	Shaukat Yousuf	Najma, Sultan Rahi	Action	
Bobby and Julie	Arshad Salman		Drama, Romance	Box Office: ?
Achhay Mian	Iqbal Akhtar	Shabnam, Mohammad Ali	Drama	Box Office: Hit
Dushman Ki Talash	Diljeet Mirza	Sudhir, Babra Sharif	Drama	Urdu/Pashto double version
Shola	Rehmat Ali	Najma, Asif Khan	Action	Box Office: Average
Mousam Hai Ashiqana	Jan Mohammad	Babra Sharif, Shahid	Drama	
Ankhon Ankhon Mein	Jan Mohammad	Shabnam, Shahid	Drama	
Qayamat	Nadeem Yousuf	Ghulam Mohiuddin, Najma	Drama	
1979
Mohabbat Bin Qasim	Altaf Hussain	Nisho, Nazim	Historical	Box Office: Flop
Parwarish	S. A. Haifz	Sweety, Ghulam Mohayuddin	Action	
Behan Bhai	Nazar Shabab	Rani, Waheed Murad	Drama	Box Office: Hit
Paisa Bolta Hai	A. H. Siddiqi	Ishrat Chaudhary	Drama	
Waaday Ki Zanjeer	Shabab Keranvi	Mohammad Ali, Anjuman	Drama	Box Office: Average
Yahan Se Wahan Tak	Kemal	Mumtaz, Waheed Murad	Overseas	Box Office: Average
Tarana	Zafar Shabab	Rani, Waheed Murad	Drama	Box Office: Average
Nayi Tehzeeb	Agha Hassan Imtesal	Rani, Shahid	Drama	
Khaak Aur Khoon	Masood Parvez	Naveen Tajak, Agha Faraz	Patriotic	Box Office: Average
Chori Chori	Tayyab Zaidi	Zeba, Mohammad Ali	Drama	Box Office: Hit
Naqsh-e-Qadam	Iqbal Akhtar	Rani, Mohammad Ali	Drama	Box Office: Average
Nishani	Jamshed Naqvi	Shabnam, Waheed Murad	Drama	Box Office: Average
Pakeeza	Parvez Malik	Shabnam, Nadeem	Drama	Box Office: Super Hit
Mr. Ranjha	Jan Mohammad	Rani, Shahid	Drama	
Raja Ki Aaye Gi Baraat	Iftikhar Khan	Mumtaz, Waheed Murad	Romance	
Nazr-e-Karm	S. Suleman	Shabnam, Shahid	Drama	
Jan Kay Dushman	Masood Khan	Badar Munir, Musarrat Shaheen	Action	
Main Chup Rahoongi	Sangeeta	Sangeeta, Kaveeta	Drama	
Neya Andaz	K. Khursheed	Shabnam, Shahid	Drama	Box Office: Average
Do Rastay	Zafar Shabab	Nadeem, Anjuman	Drama	Box Office: Flop
Kis Naam Say Pukahrun	S. A. Bukhari	Babra Sharif, Shahid	Drama	Box Office: Hit
Jeenay Ki Saza	Hassan Askari	Sultan Rahi, Mumtaz	Drama	
Ab Ghar Janay Do	Saeed Daar	Rani, Shahid	Drama	
Ibadat	Hassan Tariq	Zeba, Mohammad Ali	Drama	Box Office: Average
Lal Aandhi	Sangeeta	Kaveeta, Asif Khan	Drama	
Aurat Raj	Rangeela	Waheed Murad, Sultan Rahi	Comedy	Box Office: Average
Multan Khan	Saima Mumtaz	Nimmi, Badar Munir	Drama	Urdu/Pashto double version
Josh	Iqbal Yousuf	Babra Sharif, Rani	Drama	Box Office: Hit
Khushboo	Nazar Shabab	Rani, Shahid	Drama	Box Office: Hit
Hum Sab Chor Hayn	Jafar Bukhari	Babra Sharif, Shahid	Drama	
Chaltay Chaltay	Jan Mohammad	Shabnam, Shahid	Drama	Box Office: Average
Kashmakash	Aziz Tabassum	Chakori, Najma	Action	
Mout Meri Zindagi	Asif Rehman	Neelo, Asif Khan	Drama	
General Bakht Khan	Sarshar Akhtar Malik	Sultan Rahi, Neelo	Action	
Nishana	Baqar Rizvi	Deeba, Habib	Drama	
Gehray Zakhm	Mumtaz Ali Khan	Asif Khan, Najma	Drama	Box Office: Hit
Miss Hong Kong	Shamim Ara	Babra Sharif, Asif Raza	Overseas	Box Office: Hit
Nawabzadi	Hassan Tariq	Rani, Shahid	Drama	
Aap Se Kya Parda	Zafar Shabab	Anjuman, Mohammad Ali	Drama	Box Office: Hit
Aag	Hassan Askari	Babra Sharif, Mohammad Ali	Romance	Box Office: Hit

== 1980s ==
Title	Director	Cast	Genre	Notes
1980
Aag Aur Sholay	S. A. Haafiz	Adeeb, Manzoor Ali, Mohammad Ali, Shehbaz Durani, Ghulam Mohiuddin, Nayyar Sultana	Drama	
Bandish	Nazrul Islam	Allauddin, Diana Kristina, Nadeem Baig, Shabnam, Talish	Drama	
1981
The Blood of Hussain	Jamil Dehlavi	Salmaan Peerzada, Kika Markham, Durriya Kazi, Shoaib Hashmi, Samina Peerzada	Drama	Released in February 1981. Samina Peerzada's debut film as an actress.
1982
Mian Biwi Razi	Sangeeta	Nadeem, Kaveeta, Nanha, Agha Sikander, Saqi	Comedy film	A Platinum Jubilee film of 1982 with super-hit film songs by composer Kamal Ahmed
1983
Door-desh				
1984
1985
Hero	Iqbal Yusuf	Waheed Murad, Mumtaz, Nadeem Baig, Aslam Pervaiz, Saqi, Babra Sharif	Drama; Musical	Released 11 January 1985. Waheed Murad's last film as an actor and producer (posthumous release).
1986
Nazdeekiyan	Usmaan Peerzada	Usmaan Peerzada, Irfan Khoosat, Samina Peerzada	Romance; Drama	Released on 12 November 1986. Usmaan Peerzada's debut film as a director.
1987
1988
Bazar-e-Husn	Javed Fazil	Salma Agha, Nadeem, Samina Peerzada	Drama	
Mukhra	Iqbal Kashmiri	Nadeem, Samina Peerzada, Babra Sharif	Drama	Nadeem's debut film as a producer.
1989
Shaani	Saeed Rizvi	Babra Sharif; Sherry Malik, Mohammed Ali	Science fiction	
Taqat Ka Toofan	Sangeeta	Salma Agha, Ghulam Mohiuddin, Nadeem Baig	Action	

== 1990s ==
Title	Director	Cast	Genre	Notes
1990
Insaniyat Kay Dushman	Hasnain	Sultan Rahi, Anjuman	Social	Box Office: Hit
International Gohreelay	Jan Mohammad	Babra Sharif, Javed Sheikh	Social	Punjabi/Urdu double version
Jangju Gohreelay	Aziz Tabassum	Neeli, Javed Sheikh	Social	Punjabi/Urdu double version
Miss Cleopatra	Mohammad Javed Fazil	Babra Sharif, Sultan Rahi	Action	Punjabi/Urdu double version
Jangloos	Zahoor Hussain Gilani	Miniza Sheikh, Ajab Gul	Social	
Tezab	Sangeeta	Gori, Ismael Shah	Social	Punjabi/Urdu double version
Aasmaan	Hasnain	Babra Sharif, Nadeem	Patriotic	Box Office: Average
Raja	Iqbal Kashmiri	Nadeem, Madiha Shah	Social	Punjabi/Urdu double version
Leader	Hasnain	Kaveeta, Nadeem	Social	Box Office: Average
Bulandi	Mohammad Javed Fazil	Reema, Shaan	Social	Box Office: Average. The iconic Reema & Shaan made their debuts.
Barood Ka Tohfa	Saeed Rana	Raania, Jahanzeb	Political	Box Office: Flop. Pashto/Urdu version.
Nageena	Altaf Hussain	Madiha Shah, Shaan	Romance, Musical	Box Office: Hit. Punjabi/Urdu double version.
Kufr-o-Islam	Iqbal Yousuf	Mumtaz, Mohammad Ali	Social	Box Office: Flop. Punjabi/Urdu double version.
Ustadon Ke Ustad	Mohammad Javed Fazil	Babra Sharif, Nadeem	Social	Box Office: Flop
Haseena Atom Bomb	Saeed Ali Khan	Musarrat Shaheen, Badar Munir	Social	
Kala Pani	Rasheed Dogar	Babra Sharif, Izhar Qazi	Social	Punjabi/Urdu double version
Zehreelay	Sangeeta	Reema, Javed Sheikh	Social	Punjabi/Urdu double version
Number One	Saeed Ali Khan	Salma Agha, Izhar Qazi	Social	Punjabi/Urdu double version
Ik Daka	Mumtaz Ali Khan	Shahida Mini, Ajab Gul	Social	
1991
Kalay Chor	Nazrul Islam	Sultan Rahi, Neeli	Action	Box Office: Super Hit. Punjabi/Urdu double version.
Rambo	Mumtaz Ali Khan	Reema Khan, Ajab Gul	Action	Punjabi/Urdu double version
Mard	Altaf Hussain	Shaan, Madiha	Romance, Musical	Punjabi/Urdu double version
7 Khoon Muaf	Iqbal Kashmiri	Neeli, Reema	Action	Punjabi/Urdu double version
Ishq	Zafar Shabab	Reema Khan, Shaan	Romance, Musical	Punjabi/Urdu double version
Goli Teray Naam Ki	Suhail Khan	Sassi, Haidar Abbas	Action	Punjabi/Urdu double version
Rangeelay Chor	Iqbal Kashmiri	Madiha Shah, Tariq Shah	Action	Box Office: Average
Doulat Kay Pujari	Idrees Khan	Neeli, Sultan Rahi	Action	Punjabi/Urdu double version
Aakhri Shikar	Daud Butt	Babra Sharif, Izhar Qazi	Social	Punjabi/Urdu double version
Aalmi Jalsoos	Jan Mohammad	Kaveeta, Ghulam Mohayuddin	Action	Punjabi/Urdu double version
Naag Devta	Masood Butt	Reema, Shaan	Social	Punjabi/Urdu double version
Husn Da Chor	Altaf Hussain	Nadira, Shaan	Romance, Musical	Punjabi/Urdu double version
Zid	Mohammad Javed Fazil	Nadeem, Babra Sharif	Social	Punjabi/Urdu double version.
Chattan	Mumtaz Ali Khan	Musarrat Shaheen, Gori	Social	Punjabi/Urdu double version
3 Yakkay 3 Chhakkay	Jan Mohammad	Neeli, Sultan Rahi	Action	Punjabi/Urdu double version
Watan Kay Rakhwalay	Hasnain	Saima, Nadeem	Action	Box Office: Average. Punjabi/Urdu double version
Nadira	Altaf Hussain	Nadira, Shaan	Romance, Musical	Punjabi/Urdu double version
Nigahen	Hasnain	Madiha Shah, Shaan	Romance, Musical	Punjabi/Urdu double version
Badmash Thug	Zahoor Hussain Gilani	Javed Sheikh, Gori	Action	
Cobra	Shahid Rana	Gori, Sultan Rahi	Action	Punjabi/Urdu double version
Pyaar Karn Tun Nein Darna	Aslam Dar	Durdana Rehman, Shaan	Romance, Musical	Punjabi/Urdu double version
Ishq Deevana	Nazir Hussain	Madiha Shah, Shaan	Romance, Musical	Punjabi/Urdu double version
Aslah	Mumtaz Ali Khan	Madiha Shah, Naghma	Social	Punjabi/Urdu double version
Mastan Khan	Nazir Hussain	Adeeb, Gori	Action	Punjabi/Urdu double version
Gulfam	Hasnain	Gori, Shaan	Romance, Musical	Punjabi/Urdu double version
Aansoo	Munir Dar	Naz, Amir Farid	Social	Punjabi/Urdu double version
Pyar Hi Pyar	Iqbal Kashmiri	Reema Khan, Shaan	Romance, Musical	Punjabi/Urdu double version
Bakhtawar	Iqbal Kashmiri	Saima, Javed Sheikh	Social	Punjabi/Urdu double version
Darindgi	M. Maqbool	Javed Sheikh, Reema Khan	Social	Punjabi/Urdu double version
Pyar Aur Paisa	Saeed Akhtar	Neeli, Sonia	Social	
Sailab	Altaf Qamar	Reema Khan, Shaan	Social	Punjabi/Urdu double version
Aandhi	Nuzral Islam	Shabana, Nadeem	Social	Box Office: Flop. Punjabi/Urdu double version
Betab	Sangeeta	Kaveeta, Asad Bukhari	Social	Punjabi/Urdu double version
Medan-e-Jung	M. Sarwar	Reema Khan, Sultan Rahi	Action	Punjabi/Urdu double version
Dil	Masood Butt	Shaan, Reema Khan	Romance, Musical	
1992
Khooni Sholay	Naseem Haidar	Sultan Rahi, Anjuman	Action	Box Office: Flop. Punjabi/Urdu double version.
Shehzada	Parvez Malik	Reema Khan, Babra Sharif	Social	Box Office: Flop
Pabandi	Zahid Shah	Kaveeta, Nadeem	Social	Box Office: Flop
Naela	Hasnain	Madiha Shah, Shaan	Romance, Musical	Punjabi/Urdu double version
Dehsht Gard	Waheed Dar	Javed Sheikh, Neelo	Social	Punjabi/Urdu double version
Ashqi	Suhail Khan	Madiah Shah, Shaan	Action	Punjabi/Urdu double version
Suhag Raat	Mumtaz Ali Khan	Kaveeta, Izhar Qazi	Social	
Aag	Seema	Reema, Shaan	Romance, Musical	Punjabi/Urdu double version
Abdullah the Great	Hassan Askari	Sultan Rahi, Nadeem	Social	Box Office: Hit. Punjabi/Urdu double version.
Haseeno Ki Barat	Iqbal Kashmiri	Sultan Rahi, Anjuman	Action	Box Office: Average. Punjabi/Urdu double version.
Mohabbat Kay Soudagar	Jan Mohammad	Salma, Javed Sheikh	Romance	Punjabi/Urdu double version
Zindagi	Zahoor Hussain Ghilani	Sultan Rahi, Shahida Mini	Action	Box Office: Super Hit. Punjabi/Urdu double version.
BeNaam Badshah	Rasheed Dogar	Madiha Shah, Shaan	Social	Punjabi/Urdu double version.
Pamela	Jamshed Naqvi	Javed Sheikh, Neeli	Social	
Dunya 10 Numbri	Mohammad Javed Fazil	Nitasha, Shahida Mini	Action	Punjabi/Urdu double version
Nagin Rani	S. Jamsheri	Neelo, Tariq Shah	Social	Punjabi/Urdu double version
Mr. 420	Umer Sharif	Umer Sharif, Madiha Shah	Comedy	Box Office: Super Hit
Aur Choorian Toot Gein	Jalaluddin Khattak	Sapna, Nawaz	Romance, Musical	
Raaz	Iqbal Yousuf	Mohsin Khan, Babra Sharif	Social	Box Office: Average (in Lahore) Flop (in Karachi)
Chahat	Hasnain	Reema, Shaan	Social, Romance	Box Office: Hit. Punjabi/Urdu double version.
Police Story	Anwar Malik	Sahiba, Danish	Social	
Fateh	Zafar Sharif	Kaveeta, Shaan	Romance, Musical	Punjabi/Urdu double version
Nargis	Nazrul Islam	Madiha Shah, Javed Sheikh	Social	Box Office: Flop. Punjabi/Urdu double version.
Khoon Ka Karz	M. A. Rasheed	Nadeem, Saima	Action	Box Office: Flop. Punjabi/Urdu double version
Shama	Hasnain	Reema, Shaan	Social	Punjabi/Urdu double version
Sahiba	Altaf Hussain	Shaan, Reema	Romance	Punjabi/Urdu double version
Ishq Rehna Sada	Saeed Rana	Khushboo, Sahiba	Social	
Dosti	Shad	Neeli, Ismael Shah	Social	Punjabi/Urdu double version
Jeena Chahati Hoon	Younis Rathor	Madiha Shah, Ismael Shah	Social	
Boxer	Saeed Ali Khan	Madiha Shah, Shaan	Social	Punjabi/Urdu double version
Hero	Saeed Rana	Jan Rambo, Sahiba	Social	Punjabi/Urdu double version. Jan Rambo's first hero film.
Ishq Zindabad	Hasnain	Anjuman, Shaan	Social	Box Office: Flop. Punjabi/Urdu double version
Aaj Ka Dour	Manzoor Ahmad	Rubi Niazi, Arshad Mehmood	Social	Punjabi/Urdu double version
Abida	Ashraf Butt	Gori, Neeli	Social	Punjabi/Urdu double version
Godfather	Parvez Rana	Sultan Rahi, Nadira	Action	
Akhara	Altaf Qamar	Reema, Sultan Rahi	Social	Punjabi/Urdu double version
Silsila Pyar Ka	Aslam Dar	Shaan, Nadia	Romance	Punjabi/Urdu double version
1993
Iradha	Hassan Askari	Sultan Rahi, Hamayun Qureshi	Action	Punjabi/Urdu double version
Rambo 303	M. Sarwar Khayyal	Saima, Tariq Shah	Social	Punjabi/Urdu double version
Hina	Hasnain	Reema, Shaan	Romance, Action	Punjabi/Urdu double version
Anjuman	Hasnain	Reema, Shaan	Romance	Punjabi/Urdu double version
Ranjish	Akbar Ravi	Shabnam, Abdur Razzak	Drama	Box Office: Flop.
Nadir Shah	Younis Malik	Neeli, Sultan Rahi	Action	Punjabi/Urdu double version
Sapni	Dilawar Malik	Nadia, Izhar Qazi	Drama	Punjabi/Urdu double version
Katwal	Shahida Rana	Nadeem, Neeli	Action	Box Office: Flop. Punjabi/Urdu double version
Khuda Gawah	Masood Butt	Neeli, Sultan Rahi	Romance, Action	Box Office: Hit. Punjabi/Urdu double version
Mr Charlie	Umer Sharif	Shakeela Qureshi, Umer Sharif	Comedy	
Paidagir	Zahoor Hussain Ghilani	Sultan Rahi, Javed Sheikh	Action	Box Office: Super Hit. Punjabi/Urdu double version.
Behrupia	Sangeeta	Rangeela, Bahar	Drama	
Chakori	Masood Butt	Reema, Shaan	Romance	Punjabi/Urdu double version
Guru Chela	Saeed Rana	Sultan Rahi, Sahiba	Action	Punjabi/Urdu double version
Sheeda Talli	Iqbal Kashmiri	Javed Sheikh, Neeli	Drama	Punjabi/Urdu double version
Chandi	Hasnain	Reema, Shaan	Romance	Punjabi/Urdu double version
Nagin Sapera	Shahida Rana	Shaan, Nagis	Drama	Punjabi/Urdu double version
Neelam	Masood Butt	Reema, Shaan	Romance	Punjabi/Urdu double version
Aroosa	Hasnain	Reema, Jan Rambo	Drama	Punjabi/Urdu double version
BeTaj Badshah	Hassan Askari	Izhar Qazi, Reema	Drama	Box Office: Flop. Punjabi/Urdu double version
Daku, Chor, Sipahi	Masood Butt	Reema, Saima	Action	Punjabi/Urdu double version
Jhootay Raees	Altaf Hussain	Reema, Javed Sheikh	Drama	Punjabi/Urdu double version
Soudagar	Zahoor Hussain Ghilani	Sahiba, Sultan Rahi	Action	Punjabi/Urdu double version
Teesri Dunya	A. Riaz	Reema, Shaan	Drama	Punjabi/Urdu double version
Wah Kya Baat Hai	Jamshed Naqvi	Sana, Mohsin Khan	Co-production	
Yaadgar	Iqbal Kashmiri	Javed Sheikh, Saima	Drama	Punjabi/Urdu double version
Gunnah	Tamancha Jan	Kubra Khanum, Saud	Drama	Box Office: Average
Insaniyat	Hasnain	Shaan, Reema	Drama	Box Office: Average. Punjabi/Urdu double version
Vardi	Hasnain	Javed Sheikh, Reema	Drama	Punjabi/Urdu double version
Farishta	Hasnain	Saima, Javed Sheikh	Drama	Punjabi/Urdu double version
Ilzam	M. Faved Fazal	Rubi Niazi, Shaan	Drama	Punjabi/Urdu double version
Anhoni	Raza Mir	Neeli, Nadeem	Drama	Box Office: Flop
Prince	Saeed Rana	Sahiba, Khushboo	Drama	Punjabi/Urdu double version
Puttar Munawar Zarif Da	Altaf Hussain	Reema, Faisal Munawar Zarif	Comedy	Punjabi/Urdu double version
Kanwara Baap	Altaf Hussain	Rangeela, Naghma	Drama	Punjabi/Urdu double version
Zabata	Jahangir Qaisar	Babra Sharif, Asif Khan	Action	Punjabi/Urdu double version
Ilaqa Ghair	Mumtaz Ali Khan	Saima, Javed Sheikh	Drama	Punjabi/Urdu double version
Mazboot	M. A. Rasheed	Sabeeta, Mustafa Qureshi	Drama	Co-production with actors from Nepal, Sri Lanka & Bangladesh. Punjabi/Urdu double version.
Jannat	Iqbal Kashmiri	Nagis, Izhar Qazi	Drama	
Aadil	Altaf Hussain	Ghulam Mohayuddin, Nadira	Drama	Punjabi/Urdu double version
Jadoo Nagri	Rasheed Dogar	Shaan, Rubi Niazi	Drama	Punjabi/Urdu double version
No Baby No	Jalaluddin Khattak	Sahiba, Sultan Rahi	Action	Punjabi/Urdu double version
Aan Milo Sajna	Hasnain	Reema, Shaan	Romance	Punjabi/Urdu double version
Mr. Tabedar	Ejaz Hussain	Madiha Shah, Moin Akhtar	Comedy	Debut film of Moin. Punjabi/Urdu double version.
Haathi Mere Saathi	Shamim Ara	Jan Rambo, Reema	Drama	Box Office: Super Hit
Zamana	Mohammad Javed Fazik	Neeli, Sultan Rahi	Action	Punjabi/Urdu double version
Dunya Meri Jeib Mein	Zahoor Hussain Ghilani	Sultan Rahi, Reema	Action	Sultan Rahi and his son both acted in this film. Punjabi/Urdu double version
Khahish	Nazrul Islam	Babra Sharif	Drama	
Aan	Hassan Askari	Neeli, Sultan Rahi	Action	Punjabi/Urdu double version
Qasm	Syed Noor	Iram Hassan, Nadeem	Drama	Punjabi/Urdu double version
1994
Khan Bahadur	Masood Butt	Sultan Rahi, Saima	Action	Punjabi/Urdu double version
Chalti Ka Naam Gari	Hasnain	Aneeta Ayub, Mohsin Khan	Drama	Punjabi/Urdu double version
Nehla Dehla	Hasnain	Neeli, Javed Sheikh	Drama	Punjabi/Urdu double version
Dharkan	Hasnain	Qavi, Naghma	Drama	
Sanam Bewafa	Irshad Sajid	Madiha Shah, Izhar Qazi	Drama	Punjabi/Urdu double version
Khandan	Masood Butt	Anjuman, Sultan Rahi	Action	Box Office: Hit. Punjabi/Urdu double version.
Mahallaydar	Faisal Ejaz Ahmad	Reema, Abid Kashmiri	Drama	Punjabi/Urdu double version
Miss Fitna	Shahida Rana	Reema, Umer Sharif	Action	
Sar Kata Insan	Saeed Rizvi	Babra Sharif, Ghulam Mohayuddin	Drama	
Jaan	Jahangir Qaisar	Reema, Shaan	Romance	Punjabi/Urdu double version
Musa Khan	Saleem Qazi	Sultan Rahi, Saima	Action	Punjabi/Urdu double version
Rani Beti Raj Karay Gi	Altaf Hussain	Reema, Umer Sharif	Action	Box Office: Hit. Punjabi/Urdu double version
Sab Kay Baap	Jan Mohammad	Aneeta Ayub, Mohsin Khan	Drama	
Zamin Aasman	Hasnain	Saima, Madiha Shah	Action	Box Office: Hit. Punjabi/Urdu double version.
Albela Ashiq	Gohar Ali	Rubi Niazi, Umer Sharif	Drama	
Pyasa Sawan	Javed Raza	Sultan Rahi, Babra Sharif	Romance	Punjabi/Urdu double version.
Mohabbat Di Aag	Nasir Hussain	Shaan, Nadia	Romance	Punjabi/Urdu double version
Jameela	Hasnain	Madiha Shah, Ismael Shah	Drama	Punjabi/Urdu double version
Jan-e-Bahar	Zia Ullah	Anwar, Farah Naz	Drama	
Actor	Akram Khan	Sahiba, Umer Sharif	Action	Punjabi/Urdu double version
Pajero Group	Idrees Khan	Saima, Sultan Rahi	Action	Punjabi/Urdu double version.
International Luteray	Iqbal Kashmiri	Sultan Rahi, Nadeem	Political	Box Office: Hit. Punjabi/Urdu double version.
Jungli Mera Naam	Mohammad Latif Shah	Kaveeta, Habib	Jungle film	Punjabi/Urdu double version.
Khubsoorat Sheitan	Rangeela	Sahiba, Salman Rangeela	Comedy	Rangeela's son Salman made his debut.
Laat Sahb	Altaf Hussain	Sultan Rahi, Anjuman	Action	Box Office: Hit. Punjabi/Urdu double version.
Jaltay Badan	Tamacha Jan	Kubra Khanum, Saud	Drama	
Naseeb	Altaf Hussain	Reema, Shaan	Romance	Punjabi/Urdu double version.
Beta	Shamim Ara	Mohsin Khan, Reema	Drama	
Hathkari	Daud Butt	Nargis, Saima	Action	Punjabi/Urdu double version
Phool Aur Mali	Aslam Dar	Madiha Shah, Nadeem	Drama	Box Office: Flop
Butt Shikan	Parvez Kaleem	Saima, Yousuf Khan	Political	Punjabi/Urdu double version
Anokha Pyar	M. A. Zahid	Asif Khan, Musarrat Shaheen	Drama	
Laila	Nazrul Islam	Nadira, Izhar Qazi	Drama	Punjabi/Urdu double version
Andaz	Sohail Khan	Madiha Shah, Nadeem	Drama	Box Office: Flop
Puttar Jeeray Blade Da	Rasheed Dogar	Sahiba, Faisal Munawar Zarif	Drama	Punjabi/Urdu double version
Aakhri Mujra	Shamim Ara	Reema, Shaan	Drama	
Munda Kashmiri	Fyaz Sheikh	Reema, Shaan	Drama	Punjabi/Urdu double version
Nosarbaz	Zafar Sharif	Saima, Umer Sharif	Crime	Punjabi/Urdu double version
1995
Bhagi Shehzaday	Saeed Rana	Sultan Rahi, Saima	Action	Punjabi/Urdu double version
Jeeva	Syed Noor	Resham, Babar Ali	Drama	Box Office: Super Hit
Khazana	Hasnain	Sahiba, Nadeem		Box Office: Flop
Mr. K2	Furqan Haider	Moin Akhtar	Comedy	Box Office: Flop
Chhupay Rustam	Altaf Hussain	Rubi Niazi, Reema	Action	Punjabi/Urdu double version
Mushkil	Javed Sheikh	Neeli, Javed Sheikh	Drama	Box Office: Average
Munda Bigra Jaye	Shamim Ara	Reema, Babar Ali	Drama	Box Office: Super Hit
Dam Mast Qalandad	Zahoor Hussain Gilani	Reema, Umer Sharif	Action	Box Office: Average. Punjabi/Urdu double version.
Aawargi	Mohammad Javed Fazil	Resham, Shaan	Drama	Box Office: Flop
Madam Rani	Masood Butt	Reema, Anjuman	Action	Box Office: Super Hit. Punjabi/Urdu double version
Pazeb	Inayat Ullah Khan	Badar Munir, Saima	Drama	
Mainay Pyar Kiya	Zafar Sharif	Madiha Shah, Shaan	Romance	Punjabi/Urdu double version
Muskarahat	Iqbal Akhtar	Reema, Mohsin Khan	Drama	
Ainak Wala Jinn	Parvez Kaleem, Tamacha Jan	Shah Taj, Uroosa	Drama	
Khotay Sikkay	Altaf Hussain	Nargis, Reema	Drama	Punjabi/Urdu double version
Jeenay Do	Hassan Askari	Hina Shahin, Nawaz Khan	Drama	Punjabi/Urdu double version
Sargam	Syed Noor	Zeba Bakhtiar, Adnan Sami Khan	Romance	Box Office: Average. Zeba won Best Actress award. Adnan's debut.
Naam Ki Suhagan	M. Suhail Ali	Shaan	Drama	
Jo Dar Gaya Woh Mar Gaya	Iqbal Kashmiri	Babar Ali, Reema	Drama	Box Office: Super Hit
Panah	M. A. Rasheed	Sahiba, Nadeem	Drama	Box Office: Average
Sarak	Iqbal Kashmiri	Reema, Babar Ali	Action	
Golden Girl	Hasnain	Sultan Rahi, Anjuman	Action	Punjabi/Urdu double version
Jungle Ka Qanoon	Masood Butt	Saima, Sultan Rahi	Action	Box Office: Hit. Punjabi/Urdu double version.
Ajab Khan	Badar Munir	Madiha Shah, Badar Munir	Action	
Hum Nahin Ya Tum Nahin	Altaf Hussain	Babra Sharif, Neeli	Romance	Punjabi/Urdu double version
Kanta	Aman Mirza	Meera, Mohsin Khan	Drama	Meera's debut film
1996
Munda Tera Deevana	Zahoor Hussain Gilani	Jan Rambo, Sahiba	Drama	Sajjad Ali's debut
Love 95	Shamim Ara	Reema, Babar Ali	Drama	
Tilsimee Jazeera	Saeed Rizvi	Reema, Ghulam Mohayuddin	Drama	
Chief Saab	Javed Sheikh	Neeli, Javed Sheikh	Drama	Box Office: Hit
Chor Machaye Shor	Syed Noor	Reema, Babar Ali	Action	Box Office: Super Hit
Mamla Garbar Hai	Iqbal Kashmiri	Babar Ali, Reema	Drama	
Zamana 420	Qadir Hussain	Chandni, Sultan Rahi	Action	
Hum Toh Chalay Sasural	Shamim Ara	Reema, Babar Ali	Comedy, Musical	Box Office: Super Hit
Kurrion Ko Daley Dana	Jan Mohammad	Neeli, Mohsin	Drama	Moamar Rama's debut
Hawaen	Syed Noor	Saud, Reema	Drama	Box Office: Super Hit
Lakht-e-Jigar	Iqbal Kashmiri	Reema, Babar Ali	Action	
Sab Say Bara Rupaiya	Rahil Bari	Umer Sharid, Sultan Rahi	Action	
Ghoonghat	Syed Noor	Resham, Shaan	Drama	Box Office: Super Hit. Arbaz Khan's debut.
Raja Sahib	Shahid Rana	Sahiba, Adil Murad	Drama	
Mummy	Iqbal Kashmiri	Nadeem, Reema	Drama	Box Office: Average
Khel	Nasir Raza Khan	Sultan Rahi, Bahar	Action	
Aalmi Ghunday	Veena	Saima, Izhar Qazi, Yousuf Khan	Action	Punjabi/Urdu double version
Cheez Bari Hai Mast Mast	Shahid Mehrban	Sahiba, Jan Rambo	Drama	
Jeetay Hay Shaan Say	Jarar Rizvi	Sonia, Sahiba	Drama	
Khilona	Sangeeta	Shaan, Meera	Drama	Box Office: Super Hit
Raju Ban Geya Gentleman	Syed Noor	Mohsin Khan, Meera	Drama	
BeQabu	Masood Butt	Reema, Babar Ali	Drama	
Kashkol	Saeed Anaskh Saeedi	Asif Khan, Badar Munir	Drama	
Hum Hayn Aapkay Ghulam	Altaf Hussain	Babar Ali, Reema	Romance	
Choron Kay Ghar Chor	Saeed Rana	Khanum, Shaan	Action	
Mehndi	Zahoor Hussain Gilani	Sahiba, Kemal	Drama	
Bazigar	Iqbal Kashmiri	Meera, Babar Ali	Drama	
Aao Pyar Karen	Saleem Jafri	Javed Sheikh, Sahiba	Drama	
Saza	Shamim Ara	Mohsin Khan, Reema	Drama	
1997
Hum Kisi Say Kam Nahin	Shamim Ara	Sahiba, Reema	Romance	
Mafia	Parvez Rana	Reema, Babar Ali	Action	Box Office: Average. Punjabi/Urdu double version.
Uqabon Ka Nasheman	Syed Noor	Reema, Babar Ali	Drama	
Najaiz	Iqbal Kashmiri	Reema, Nadeem	Drama	Box Office: Average
Aulad Ki Kasam	Mohammad Javed Fasil	Reema, Babar Ali	Action	Box Office: Average. Shabnam's last film.
Miss Klashankoff	Zafar Sharif	Shahida Mini, Ghulam Mohayuddin	Drama	
Dunya Hai Dil Walon Ki	Shamim Ara	Reema, Jan Rambo	Drama	
Main Khilari Tu Anari	Iqbal Kashmiri	Reema, Babar Ali	Drama	
Ashqi Khel Nahin	Sangeeta	Meera, Saud	Romance	
Khuda Janay	Masood Butt	Babar Ali, Reema	Drama	
Chand Girhan	Altaf Qamar	Nadeem, Babar Ali	Drama	Box Office: Flop
Hum Tumharay Hayn	Aslam Dar	Babar Ali, Reema	Romance	Box Office: Average
Mard Jeenay Nahin Detay	Altaf Hussain	Neeli, Izhar Qazi	Drama	
Ghail	Hasnain	Babra Sharif, Izhar Qazi	Drama	
Dil Kisi Ka Dost Nahin	Hassan Askari	Saima, Saud	Drama	Box Office: Hit
Umar Mukhtar	Hasnain	Reema, Yousuf Khan	Drama	Box Office: Average
Sangam	Syed Noor	Shaan, Resham	Romance, Musical	Box Office: Hit. Waris Baig's debut.
Karam Data	Hasnain	Reema, Nadeem	Drama	Box Office: Average. Punjabi/Urdu double version.
Karishma	Shamim Ara	Reema, Saud	Drama	Shot in Istanbul, Turkey
Dream Girl	Sangeeta	Meera, Saud	Drama	
Raja Pakistani	Syed Noor	Babar Ali, Reema	Drama	Box Office: Average
Anchal	Altaf Hussain	Resham, Arbaz Khan	Drama	Box Office: Average
Yes Boss	Javed Sheikh	Javed Sheikh, Meera	Drama	
Sharafat	Altaf Hussain	Saima, Saud	Drama	
Jeet	Sangeeta	Meera, Saud	Drama	
Jan Jan Pakistan	Khalid Hussain	Sahiba, Jan Rambo	Patriotic	
Fareb	Masood Butt	Shaan, Laila	Drama	
Dil Tera Aashiq	Nasir Sindhu	Neeli, Mohsin	Drama	
Mohabbat Hay Kya Cheez	Altaf Hussain	Shaan, Resham	Drama	Box Office: Average
Dil Walay	Akram Khan	Saima, Javed Sheikh	Drama	
Deevanay Teray Pyar Kay	Syed Noor	Deeba, Nadeem	Romance	Box Office: Super Hit
Barsaat Ki Raat	Anjum Parvez	Shaan, Sahiba	Drama	
Dil Bhi Tera Hum Bhi Teray	Saeed Rizvi	Mohsin Khan, Sahiba	Romance	Punjabi/Urdu double version
Qarz	Ustad Nazakat Ali Khan	Nirma, Babar Ali	Drama	
Devar Deevanay	Tamacha Jan	Reema, Babar Ali	Drama	
1998
Insaf Ho To Aisa	Masood Butt	Shaan, Reema	Action	
Muhafiz	Syed Noor	Saima, Saud	Drama	Box Office: Average
Very Good Dunya Very Bad Log	S. Suleman	Shaan, Resham	Drama	
Kabhi Haan Kabhi Naa	Shamim Ara	Meera, Shaan	Drama	
Zewar	Syed Noor	Reema, Babar Ali	Drama	
Ehsas	Sangeeta	Javed Sheikh, Shaan	Drama	
Tu Meri Main Tera	Shoukat Sharif	Reema, Shaan	Drama	
Jisay Day Maula	Masood Butt	Reema, Shaan	Drama	
Waris	Iqbal Kashmiri	Shaan, Reema	Romance	
Zor	Syed Noor	Saima, Reema	Drama	Box Office: Hit
Deewaren	Syed Noor	Reema, Babar	Drama	Box Office: Average
Dil Sambhala Na Jaye	Iqbal Kashmiri	Babar Ali, Reema	Drama	
Nikah	Sangeeta	Reema, Shaan	Romance, Musical	Box Office: Super Hit
Dunya Dekhay Gi	Nasir Adeeb	Shaan, Resham	Drama	
Khalnaik	Sarfaraz Hussain	Nargis, Javed Sheikh	Drama	
Harjai	Sangeeta	Meera, Babar	Drama	
Tu Chor Main Sipahi	Agha Riaz Gul	Sana, Arbaz Khan	Action	
King Maker	Parvez Rana	Reema, Shaan	Drama	
Kahin Pyar Na Ho Jaye	Javed Sheikh	Resham, Shaan	Romance	
Sahib, Bibi, Aur Tawaif	Sangeeta	Chandni, Javed Sheikh	Drama	
Dupatta Jal Raha Hai	Syed Noor	Saima, Arbaz Khan	Drama	Box Office: Hit
Suhag	Rashid Malik	Saima, Sana	Drama	
Dulha Lay Kay Jaun Gi	Altaf Hussain	Reema, Babar Ali	Drama	
2 Boond Pani	Sangeeta	Resham, Shaan	Drama	
Hasina Numbri Ashiq 10 Numbri	Iqbal Kashmiri	Meera, Shaan	Drama	
Khatarnak Haseena	Iqbal Akhtar	Sabeeta, Javed Sheikh	Action	
Mohlat	Iqbal Kashmiri	Resham, Moamar Rana	Drama	Box Office: Average
Sahib Ji	M. A. Rasheed	Javed Sheikh, Reema	Drama	Box Office: Flop
Doli Saja Kay Rakhna	Aslam Dar	Shaan, Reema	Drama	Box Office: Average
1999
Guns and Roses	Shaan	Shaan, Meera	Action	
Koela	Masood Butt	Saima, Shaan	Action	
Chupkay Chupkay	Shamim Ara	Resham, Moamar Rana	Drama	
Inteha	Samina Pirzada	Meera, Humayun Qureshi	Drama	Box Office: Super Hit
Chand Babu	Umer Sharif	Saima, Umer Sharif	Drama	
Dekha Jaye Ga	Nasir Adeeb	Saima, Shaan	Drama	
Dunya Se Kya Darna	Daud Butt	Saima, Javed Sheikh	Drama	
Dil Mein Chhupa Kay Rakhna	Imtiaz Qaisar	Saima, Shaan	Drama	Box Office: Average. Punjabi/Urdu double version.
Insaniyat Kay Qatil	Shahid Mehrban	Meera, Saud	Drama	
Qaid	Sangeeta	Zeba Bakhtiar, Saud	Drama	
Ek Aur Love Story	Syed Noor	Nirma, Sajjad Ali	Romance	
Kursi Aur Qanoon	Masood Butt	Babar Ali, Reema	Action	
Ghaddar	Anjum Islam	Faisal Munawar Zarif, Khushboo	Drama	
Jannat Ki Talash	Hassan Askari	Shaan, Resham	Action	
Ik Pagal Si Larki	Altaf Hussain	Reema, Moamar Rana	Drama	
Mujhay Jeenay Do	Javed Sheikh	Meera, Javed Sheikh	Drama	
Virasat	Masood Butt	Saima, Moamar Rana	Drama	
Ishq Zinda Rahega	Parvez Rana	Neeli, Shaan	Drama	
Noukar	Hasnain	Reema, Saud	Drama	
Qismat	Sangeeta	Moamar Rana, Reema	Drama	
Dil To Pagal Hay	Sangeeta	Reema, Shaan	Drama	
Jazba	Hassan Askari	Saima, Shaan	Drama	
Pal 2 Pal	Shamim Ara	Meera, Saud	Drama	
Sala Bigra Jaye	Wajid Ali Nashad	Saima, Shaan	Drama	
Hawwa Ki Beti	Tahir Rizvi	Sapna, Izhar Qazi	Drama	

== 2000s ==
Title	Director	Cast	Genre	Notes
2000
Aag Ka Darya		Noor, Shaan, Sana		
Billi	Syed Noor	Saima, Nadeem, Meera, Noor	Horror	
Ghar Kab Aao Gay	Iqbal Kashmiri	Saima, Shaan, Sana, Meera, Zeeshan, Javed Sheikh	Action; Drama	Released on 9 January 2000
Mujhe Chand Chahiye	Shaan Shahid	Shaan Shahid, Noor, Atiqa Odho, Moammar Rana, Reema, Javed Sheikh, Ismail Tara	Comedy; Drama	Released on 17 March 2000
Sultana Daku		Saima, Shaan, Sana		
Tere Pyar Mein	Hassan Askari	Shaan Shahid, Zara Sheikh, Veena Malik	Romance; Drama	Released on 28 December 2000. Zara Sheikh's debut film.
Yeh Hui Na Mardon Wali Baat	Farjad Nabi	Resham, Munna, Raheel, Guriya	Short	
2001
Babu		Zeba Bakhtiar, Saud		
Moosa Khan	Shaan Shahid	Saima, Shaan Shahid, Noor, Jan Rambo	Drama	Released on 17 December 2001. Shaan's first film as a director.
2002
Chalo Ishq Larain	Sajjad Gul	Meera, Zara Sheikh, Ali Haider	Musical, Comedy, Romance	Released in April 2002
Ghazi Ilmuddin Shaheed		Noor, Moamar Rana		
Yeh Dil Aap Ka Huwa	Javed Sheikh	Babar Ali, Veena Malik, Moammar Rana, Sana, Javed Sheikh, Saleem Sheikh	Romance	Released on 19 July 2002
2003
Larki Panjaban	Syed Noor	Babar Ali, Shamil Khan, Saima	Drama	Released on 25 December 2003
Shararat	Samina Peerzada	Babar Ali, Mehr Hassan, Nirma, Shaan Shahid	Romance; Musical	Released on 10 January 2003
Yeh Waada Raha		Saima, Shaan, Moamar		
2004
Hum Ek Hain	Syed Noor	Shaan Shahid; Saima	Drama	Released in November 2004. A very sensitive story about the Shia-Sunni conflict in Pakistan.
Khamosh Pani	Sabiha Sumar	Kiron Kher, Aamir Ali Malik, Arsad Mahmud	Drama	Released on 25 February 2004 (France)
Salakhain	Shehzad Rafiq	Zara Sheikh, Meera, Saud, Ahmed Butt	Action; Drama	Released on 13 August 2004
2005
Koi Tujh Sa Kahan	Reema Khan	Irfan Khosat, Veena Malik, Nadeem, Moammar Rana, Reema Khan	Drama	Released on 12 August 2005. Reema Khan's debut film as a director and producer.
Kyun Tum Se Itna Pyar Hai	Ajab Gul	Ajab Gul, Talat Hussain, Veena Malik, Nadeem, Sana	Action	Released on 29 April 2005
2006
Fire	Asif Ali Pota	Reema Khan, Meera, Moammar Rana, Saud, Nirma	Action	
Gunahon Ka Shehar		Sana, Ahmad Butt, Saima Khan		
Jism		Roofi Ana'am, Shamyl Khan		
One Two Ka One		Saima, Moamar Rana, Reema		
Pehla Pehla Pyaar	Mubashir Luckman	Zara Sheikh, Nadeem, Resham, Ali Tabish, Babrak Shah	Romance; Drama	Released on 11 January 2006
Tarrap	Sangeeta	Nadeem, Resham, Saud, Babrak Shah	Drama	Released on 24 October 2006
2007
Godfather	Hariday Shetty	Vinod Khanna, Arbaaz Khan, Meera, Ajab Gul and Shafqat Cheema	Action	Released on 14 October 2007
Jhoomer	Syed Noor	Saima; Moammar Rana	Romance; Drama	Released on 2 November 2007
Khuda Ke Liye	Shoaib Mansoor	Shaan Shahid, Naseeruddin Shah, Fawad Afzal Khan, Iman Ali, Hameed Sheikh	Drama	Released on 7 July 2007
Khulay Aasman Ke Neechay	Javed Sheikh	Humayoon Saeed, Javed Sheikh, Bahroz Sabswari, Sana	Drama	
Mein Ek Din Laut Ke Aaoonga	Mohammad Javed Fazil	Humayun Saeed, Nadeem, Nausheen Sardar Ali, Puja Kanwal and Javed Sheikh	Drama	Released on 24 August 2007
Zibahkhana	Omar Ali Khan	Ashfaq Bhatti, Sultan Billa, Osman Khalid Butt, Rubya Chaudhry	Horror	Pakistan's first gore film. Released on 30 March 2007 (Denmark).
2008
Kabhi Pyar Na Karna	Javed Raza	Zara Sheikh; Moammar Rana	Romance; Drama	Released on 18 April 2008
Ramchand Pakistani	Mehreen Jabbar		Drama	
Khulay Aasman Ke Neechay	Saleem Sheikh, Humayun Saeed, Sana Fakhar	Romance		
2009
Aaj Ki Larki				

== 2020s ==
Title	Director	Cast	Genre	Notes
2020
Money Back Guarantee	Faisal Qureshi	Fawad Khan, Hina Dilpazir, Ali Safina	Comedy	Postponed due to the COVID-19 pandemic

== See also ==
- Lists of Pakistani films
- Cinema of Pakistan
- List of Pakistani Punjabi-language films
- List of Pashto-language films
- List of Sindhi-language films
- List of Pakistani Bengali films
- Lists of Hindi films
- Deccani cinema and List of Hyderabadi-language films, Indian films in an Urdu dialect
