= Zameen Aasman =

- Zamin Aasman
- Directed by: Hasnain; Pervez Chaudhry
- Written by: Bashir Niaz
- Produced by: Agha Hussaini; Sohail Hussaini
- Starring: Nadeem; Saima; Sultan Rahi; Izhar Qazi; Madiha Shah; Reema; Umer Shareef; Nargis; Humayun Qureshi; Bahar; Qavi Khan; Shafqat Cheema; Adeeb
- Cinematography: Sajjad Rizvi
- Edited by: Z A Zulfi
- Music by: M Ashraf; Lyricist: Khawaja Pervez; Singers: Noor Jehan; Humaira Channa
- Distributed by: Imraan films
- Release date: 22 May 1994 (Pakistan)
- Running time: 160 (minutes)
- Country: Pakistan
- Languages: Urdu; Punjabi

Zameen Aasman (Urdu Punjabi Double version زمین آسمان) is a 1994 Pakistani drama film action film.

The film is directed by Hasnain and produced by Agha Hussaini and stars Nadeem, Sultan Rahi, Saima, Izhar Qazi, Madiha Shah.

== Cast ==
- Nadeem
- Sultan Rahi
- Saima
- Reema Khan
- Izhar Qazi
- Madiha Shah
- Sabeetha Perera
- Shiva Shrestha
- Umer Shareef
- Nargis
- Humayun Qureshi
- Bahar Begum
- Zahir Shah
- Adeeb
- Altaf Khan
- Shafqat Cheema
- Majeed Zarif
- Seema
- Qavi Khan

== Track list ==
The soundtrack was composed by the musician M Ashraf, with lyrics by Khawaja Pervez and sung by Noor Jehan, Humaira Channa.

#	Title	Singer(s)
1	"Ishq ka raga laga zara.."	Humaira Channa
2	"Tu Aashiq, Main Pagli Teri.."	Humaira Channa
3	"Teray Mukhray peh maray lashkaray.."	Humaira Channa
4	"Mujhay raat ko neend na aye.."	Humaira Channa
5	"Larki dekh kay Patolay wargi.."	Humaira Channa
