= International Luteray =

1994 Pakistani action film

International Luteray اِنٹرنیشنل لٹیرے
- Directed by: Iqbal Kashmiri
- Written by: Nasir Adib
- Story by: Nasir Adeeb
- Produced by: Farooq Mirza; Saeed Mirza
- Starring: Sultan Rahi; Saima; Nadeem; Ghulam Mohiuddin; Madiha Shah; Nargis; Qavi; Rambo; Albela; Humayun Qureshi; Deeba
- Narrated by: Mian Farzand Ali
- Cinematography: Saleem Butt
- Edited by: Zamir Qamir; Qasir Zamir
- Music by: Wajahat Attray
- Production company: International Studio (Karachi)
- Distributed by: Waleed Films
- Release date: 12 August 1994 (Pakistan)
- Running time: 157 minutes
- Countries: Pakistan, Sri Lanka
- Language: Urdu Punjabi (Double version)

International Luteray (Punjabi, Urdu: انٹرنیشنل لٹیرے) is a 1994 Pakistani action film, directed by Iqbal Kashmiri and produced by Farooq Mirza. Editor: Mohammed Ashiq Ali The film stars actors Neeli, Sultan Rahi, Nadeem, Ghulam Mohiuddin, Humayun Qureshi.

== Cast ==
- Sultan Rahi
- Nadeem
- Saima (double role)
- Ghulam Mohiuddin
- Madiha Shah
- Afzal Khan
- Nargis
- Deeba
- Qavi
- Humayun Qureshi
- Asim Bukhari
- Albela

== Soundtrack ==
International Luteray

Soundtrack album by Wajahat Attray
- Released: 1994-8-12
- Recorded: Friday, 29 July 1994
- Genre: Film soundtrack
- Length: 18:48
- Language: Urdu Punjabi (Double version)
- Label: No Complete Music
- Director: Iqbal Kashmiri
- Producer: Farooq Mirza; Lyrics; Khawaja Pervez; Singers; Humaira Channa; A Nayyar; Masood Rana; Saira Naseem; Shujaat Bobby; Arif Pirzada

=== Track listing ===
No.	Title	Artist(s)	Length
1.	"Koi Maswara De"	Humaira Channa	5:23
2.	"Merey Luk Te Pyr Ho Gi"	Saira Naseem	4:57
3.	"Ali Ali Dam Ali Ali"	A Nayyar	3:05
4.	"Jab Bhi Ali Ka Naam Liya"	Masood Rana, Saira Naseem	5:23
