= Hasan Askari =

Hasan Askarimay refer to:

- Hasan Askari Rizvi, Pakistani defense analyst
- Hasan Askari (writer), Indian-born Pakistani writer
- Agha Hasan Askari, Pakistani film director
