= Gandasa =

1991 film by Hasan Askari

- Directed by: Hasan Askari; Nadeem Hassan (Guests)
- Written by: Saleem Murad
- Screenplay by: Saleem Murad
- Story by: Saleem Murad
- Produced by: Mohammad Jahangir; Rana Javed Iqbal
- Starring: Sultan Rahi; Gori; Tanzeem Hassan; Shahida Mini; Anwar Khan; Nida Mumtaz; Adeeb; Rashid Mehmood; Mehmood Aslam
- Cinematography: Irshad Ahmad; Abid
- Edited by: Z. A. Zulfi
- Music by: Wajahat Attre; Lyrics: Ahmad Rahi; Singers: Noor Jehan; Anwar Rafi; Humaira Channa
- Production company: Shah Noor Studio
- Distributed by: Jahangir Films
- Release date: 16 April 1991
- Running time: 140 minutes
- Country: Pakistan
- Language: Punjabi

Gandasa is a Pakistani film in Punjabi language, released on 16 April 1991 by screenwriter Saleem Murad. The film was directed by Hasan Askari and produced by Jahangir Khan.

== Cast ==
- Sultan Rahi
- Gori
- Anwar Khan
- Nida Mumtaz
- Shahida Mini
- Tanzeem Hassan
- Asim Bukhari
- Adeeb
- Humayun Qureshi
- Mehmood Aslam
- Rashid Mehmood
- Altaf Khan
- Raseela

== History ==
A 'Gandasa' is a Punjabi implement primarily used in cultivation and farming. It consists of a long stick of wood (roughly the height of its user) with a wide blade attached to one end. It resembles a very large axe, although it is used in a different manner.

The use of the gandasa as a weapon was made famous by the Lollywood film Maula Jatt (1979) and its sequels, in which the implement was portrayed as an excalibur-like weapon used in the Punjabi action films for fighting and killing other people.

== Soundtrack ==
The music of Gandasa is composed by Wajahat Attre with lyrics by Ahmad Rahi.

Gandasa

Soundtrack album by Wajahat Attre
- Recorded: 1991
- Genre: Film soundtrack
- Length: 27:59
- Language: Punjabi
- Label: Super Musical
- Director: Hasan Askari
- Producer: Jahangir Khan
- Compiler: M. Zafar

=== Track listing ===
No.	Title	Artist(s)	Length
1.	"Gut Kali Lal Paranda"	Noor Jehan	4:37
2.	"Hari Hari Sub Dunia"	Anwar Rafi & Humaira Channa	4:57
3.	"Merian Choodian Udas"	Noor Jehan	4:21
4.	"Mahiya Ve Kothay Uttay"	Noor Jehan	4:18
5.	"Ang Ang Mera"	Humaira Channa	4:54
6.	"Ek Gal Tere Naal Kerni"	Noor Jehan	4:37
