= Yeh Hui Na Mardon Wali Baat =

- Directed by: Farjad Nabi; Mazhar Zaidi
- Starring: Resham; Munna; Raheel; Guriya
- Edited by: Abrar Rohaila
- Release date: 2000
- Running time: 35 minutes
- Country: Pakistan
- Language: Urdu

Yeh Hui Na Mardon Wali Baat is a Pakistani Urdu film directed by Farjad Nabi and Mazhar Zaidi starring Resham, Raheel, Guriya and Munna.

== Plot ==
Yeh hui na mardon wali baat or Now that's more like a man is the Pakistani contribution to a South Asian film project. It has taken a rather peculiar angle to look into the issue of masculinity. Though it's a film about men, there aren't any in it. The film looks at the issue through the eyes of women! The film is a juxtaposing of a series of interview clips of women from different backgrounds. The only common bond among them is that they all hail from Lahore. As these women talk about men in their capacities as brothers, husbands, fathers, lovers etc., a sort of profile of an ideal man emerges. What does the society these women come from, expect of a man?

== Background ==
Yeh Hui Na Mardon Wali Baat is part of a South Asia wide project sponsored by Save the Children UK and UNICEF. In an attempt to explore the concept of masculinity in various cultures of the region, four filmmakers were commissioned from India, Pakistan, Bangladesh and Nepal. These filmmakers tried to investigate different aspects of the issue in their respective environments and produced four different films. These films have been released jointly in Delhi, Dhaka, Kathamandu and Karachi in 1999 and have earned critical reviews across the region.

== Cast ==
- Resham
- Raheel
- Sheetal
- Usman
- Yasir
- Munna
- Guriya
