= Baqar Rizvi =

Pakistani cricketer (born 1968)

Personal information
- Full name: Syed Baqar Rizvi
- Born: 9 February 1968 (age 58); Karachi, Sindh, Pakistan
- Batting: Right-handed
- Bowling: Right-arm fast-medium

Domestic team information
- Years: Team
- 2002–2006: Wiltshire
- 1994/95-1996/98: Karachi Whites
- 1990/91: Karachi
- 1989/90-1995/96: Karachi Blues
- 1988/89: Pakistan Universities

Career statistics
| Competition | FC | LA |
|---|---|---|
| Matches | 23 | 33 |
| Runs scored | 306 | 239 |
| Batting average | 11.76 | 11.95 |
| 100s/50s | –/– | –/– |
| Top score | 45 | 47 |
| Balls bowled | 2,464 | 1,150 |
| Wickets | 55 | 25 |
| Bowling average | 30.36 | 35.88 |
| 5 wickets in innings | 4 | – |
| 10 wickets in match | – | – |
| Best bowling | 6/75 | 3/41 |
| Catches/stumpings | 6/– | 4/– |
- Source: CricketArchive, 12 October 2010

Syed Baqar Rizvi Urdu: سید باقر رضوی (born 9 February 1968) is a former Pakistani cricketer. Rizvi was a right-handed batsman who bowled right-arm fast-medium. He was born in Karachi, Sindh.

Rizvi made his first-class debut for Pakistan Universities against Sri Lanka B in 1989. From 1989 to 1997, he represented a number of the Karachi cricket teams in a combined total of 23 first-class matches, the last of which came for Karachi Whites against Bahawalpur. In his 23 first-class matches, he scored 306 runs at a batting average of 11.76, with a high score of 45. With the ball he took 55 wickets at a bowling average of 30.36, with 4 five wicket hauls and best figures of 6/75.

He also made his List A debut in Pakistani domestic cricket for Karachi Blues against Karachi Whites in 1989. From 1989 to 1997, he represented both the Karachi Whites and Karachi Blues in a combined total of 30 List A matches, the last of which in his domestic career in Pakistan came for Karachi Whites against Habib Bank Limited.

In 2002, Rizvi joined Wiltshire in English County Cricket. He made his Minor Counties Championship debut against Devon. From 2002 to 2006, he represented the county in 25 Minor Counties Championship matches, the last of which came against Cornwall. Rizvi also represented Wiltshire in the MCCA Knockout Trophy. His debut in that competition for Wiltshire came against Devon in 2002. From 2002 to 2006, he represented the county in 13 Trophy matches, the last of which came against Northumberland. Rizvi also represented Wiltshire in 3 List-A matches. His Wiltshire List A debut came against the Hampshire Cricket Board in the 1st round of the 2003 Cheltenham & Gloucester Trophy, which was played in 2002. His second came against Nottinghamshire in the 2004 Cheltenham & Gloucester Trophy, with his third and final career List A match coming against Kent in the 2005 Cheltenham & Gloucester Trophy. In his total of 33 List A matches, he scored 239 runs at an average of 11.95, with a high score of 47. With the ball he took 25 wickets at an average of 35.88, with best figures of 3/41.
