= Jan Mohammad =

Film director (1943 - 2002)

Jan Muhammad
- Born: 1943; Karachi
- Died: 2002 (aged 58–59)
- Occupations: Film director, Film producer
- Years active: 1973 – 2002
- Children: Jamshaid Jan

Jan Muhammad (Urdu:جان محمد;1943–2002) was a Pakistani film director. He directed more than 30 feature films.

== Early life ==
Jan Mohammad was born in 1943 and was brought up in Karachi. He got his early education from St Patrick's High School, Karachi, Pakistan and went to D. J. Science College for his bachelor's degree. He joined Pakistan film industry in 1967 as an assistant cameraman. Jan Mohammad received higher training in cinematography from Belgium and France and also took Agfa Gevaert Cinematographer's Course in England.

== Film directing career ==
Waheed Murad and Shamim Ara starrer film Salgira (1969), was his first film as an independent cinematographer followed by the film, Chand Suraj (1970) and a number of other films by reputed film makers like Rangeela. In 1972, he joined the rank of producer and made the film, Sehre Kay Phool, as a co-producer, followed by Dilnasheen and Parda Na Uthao . As a film director, Dekha Jayega (1976), was his first film which proved to be a big box office hit. He also directed Chaltay Chaltay, Hong Kong Kay Sholay and International Gorillay among many others.

Jan Mohammad received numerous national and international awards in photography and direction including Agfa Award and Screen Advertising World Association Award as well as an appreciation letter for his outstanding work from US Ambassador Joseph S. McFarland.

Jan Muhammad introduced many stars like Moammar Rana, Sahiba and Saima Noor. His son, Jamshaid Jan Muhammad, is also a famous Ad Film Maker, who in 2016 released his debut film as a director Sawaal 700 Crore Dollars Ka (2016), aka "Question of 7 Million Dollars" which was a hit in Pakistan.

== Filmography ==
- Dekha Jayega (1976)
- Bohat Khoob
- Aamna Saamna
- Mausam Hay Aashiqana (1978)
- Chaltay Chaltay (1979)
- Mr. Ranjha (1979)
- Parakh (1978)
- Jawani Deewani (1977)
- Teena (1983)
- Hong Kong Kay Sholay (1985)
- Bangkok Kay Chor (1986)
- Manila Ki Bijlian (1987)
- Choron Ka Badshah (1988)
- Roop Ki Rani (1989)
- Manila Kay Jaanbaaz (1989)
- International Gorillay (1990)
- Aalmi Jasoos (1991)
- Teen Yakkay Teen Chakkay (1991)
- Mohabbat Kay Saudagar (1991)
- Sab Kay Baap (1994)
- Kurrion Ko Dalay Dana (1996)
