= Agha Hasan Askari =

Pakistani film director (1944/1945 – 2023)

- Born: 28 January, 1945; Lahore
- Died: 30 October 2023 (aged 78); Lahore, Punjab, Pakistan
- Other names: 'Agha Jee'
- Occupations: Director; Producer; Screenwriter
- Awards: National Film Award (2 times); Pride of Performance Award by the President of Pakistan in 2024; Won 5 Nigar Awards during his career

Agha Hasan Askari (28 January 1945 – 30 October 2023) was a Pakistani film director, producer and screenwriter of the Lollywood industry.

Before joining Tariq Masood Qureshi, he started his career as an assistant director on the Punjabi titles Chan Makhana and Sajan Pyaara by Kaifi. His first film as a director was Khun Pasina starring Firdous, Sultan Rahi, Rukhsana and Agha Talish.

== Early life and education ==
Born in 1945 at Lahore, with a M.A. degree in English Literature, Askari was fond of writing since his college days, during those times being the editor of Faran, the magazine of leftist National Students Federation (NSF), and throughout his life would remain a committed Marxist, which would influence the social message in his movies. This also reflected and was a result of his own struggles as a member of the lower middle class in Pakistan.

== Career ==
During his career, Askari directed around 60 Punjabi and Urdu films, besides producing 10 of them. Among his memorable works in more than 60 projects are Wehshi Jat (1975 film), Khun Pasina, Khazana, Jannat Ki Taan, Aag, Be Qarar, Dooriyan and Tere Pyar Mein (2000 film) is included. Notably, Askari is credited with first introducing the iconic Sultan Rahi as "Maula Jat", introducing his iconic Gandasa in the groundbreaking 1975 film Wehshi Jatt, years before the iconic Maula Jatt (1979 film). He directed over 50 films, devoted 55 years of his life to Pakistani film industry.

== Death ==
Askari died on 30 October 2023, at the age of 78. He had been suffering from lung cancer for a long time and was undergoing treatment at Sheikh Zayed Hospital in Lahore. He is survived by a widow, a daughter and a son. His funeral prayer was performed after noon prayer at his residence on Alamgir Street in Lahore, Pakistan.

== Filmography ==
Year	Title	Language
1972	Khoon Paseena (his debut as a film director and this film reflected his political thoughts as well)	Punjabi
1972	Sir Dhar Di Bazi	Punjabi
1972	Heera	Punjabi
1973	Ghairat Da Nishan	Punjabi
1975	Wehshi Jatt	Punjabi
1976	Toofan	Punjabi
1977	Aakhri Medan	Punjabi
1977	Qanoon	Punjabi
1977	Salakhein	Urdu
1979	Jeenay Ki Saza	Urdu
1979	Jatt Da Kharak	Punjabi
1979	Dada Pota	Punjabi
1979	Aag	Urdu
1981	Muftbar	Punjabi
1982	Kinara	Urdu
1983	Ek Doojay Kay Liye	Urdu
1984	Doorian	Urdu
1985	2 Hathkarian	Punjabi
1985	Ham Aur Tum	Urdu/Punjabi
1986	Beqarar	Urdu
1986	Akbar Khan	Punjabi
1986	Talash	Urdu
1986	Mela	Punjabi
1987	Ik Si Daku	Punjabi
1987	Nijat	Urdu
1987	Sonay Ki Talash	Urdu
1988	Mafroor	Punjabi
1988	Qatil	Punjabi
1988	Sherbaz Khan	Punjabi
1990	Puttar Jaggay Da	Punjabi
1990	Sher Dil	Punjabi
1991	Gandasa	Punjabi
1991	Riaz Gujjar	Punjabi
1992	Abdullah The Great	Punjabi/Urdu
1992	Pattan	Punjabi
1992	Achha Shookar Vala	Punjabi
1993	Iradah	Punjabi/Urdu
1993	BeTaj Badshah	Punjabi/Urdu
1993	Aan	Punjabi/Urdu
1995	Khazana	Urdu
1995	Jeenay Do	Punjabi/Urdu
1996	Saboot	Pashto
1996	2 Jeedar	Punjabi
1997	Dil Kisi Ka Dost Nahin	Urdu
1999	Jannat Ki Talash	Urdu
1999	Jazba	Urdu
1999	Chaudhrani	Punjabi
2000	Kahan Hay Qanoon	Urdu
2000	Tere Pyar Mein	Urdu
2001	Badmash Puttar	Punjabi
2001	Ik Jagga Hor	Punjabi
2002	Chalo Ishq Larain	Urdu
2002	Veryam	Punjabi
2004	Sassi Punno	Punjabi
2005	Bau Badmash	Punjabi
2008	Basanti	Punjabi
2013	Dil Praey Des Mein	Urdu
2014	Dastan	Pashto

== Awards ==
- Won 5 Nigar Awards for 'Best Director' for Wehshi Jat (1975), Toofan (1976 film), Doorian (1984 film), Jannat Ki Talash (1999 film) and Tere Pyar Mein (2000 film).
- National Film Awards (Pakistan) (two-times)
- Pride of Performance Award by the President of Pakistan in 2024.
