= Madiha Shah =

Pakistani film and TV actress

- مدیحہ شاہ
- Born: 8 February 1970 (age 56); Lahore, Punjab,
- Occupations: Actress, Model, Fashion designer, Beautician
- Years active: 1988–present
- Spouse: Javed Iqbal (m. 2014)

Madiha Shah is a Pakistani film, TV, and stage actor. She was active in film during the 1990s. In 2014, it was reported that she had tied the knot with Pakistani-Canadian businessman Javed Iqbal.
