= Humaira Channa =

Pakistani singer

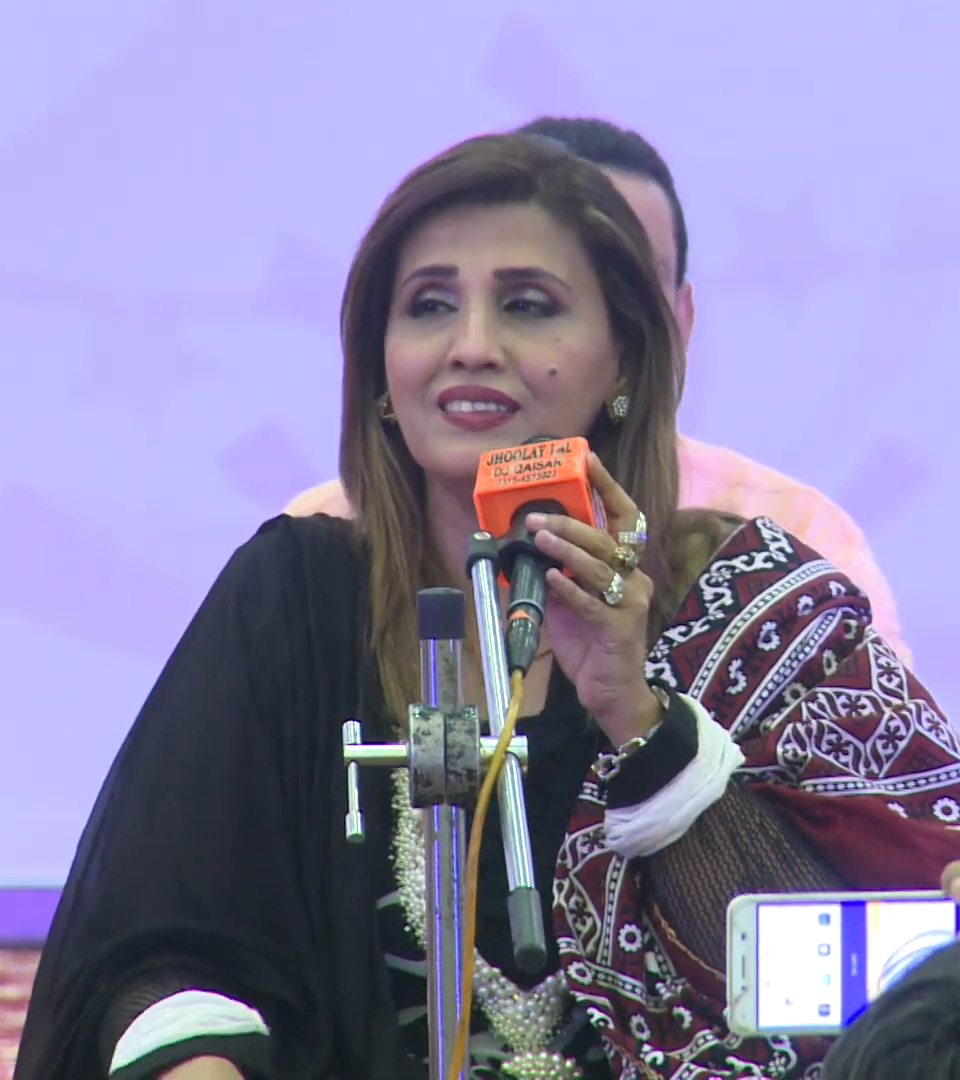
- Humera Channa in 2019
- Born: حمیرا چنا; February 26, 1966 (age 60)
- Occupations: Film playback singer, folk singer
- Years active: 1987 – present
- Awards: Pride of Performance Award by the President of Pakistan (2017); 6 Nigar Awards in 1986, 1989, 1991, 1993, 1994 and 1997

Humaira Channa, also known as Humera Channa (born on 22 Jun 1966 at Hyderabad), is a 6 Nigar Award-winning film playback singer from Pakistan. She has won the 3rd highest number of Nigar Awards in history, ranked only after Noor Jehan and Mehnaz.

== Early life and career ==
Channa was born in a Sindhi Muslim family. She entered the Pakistani entertainment industry influenced by her father who was a filmmaker. She first sang for her father's film at the age of nine. Then she was given an opportunity to sing folk songs of Sufi Shah Abdul Latif Bhittai on Pakistani television, Karachi. She rose to fame in the early 1990s. She sings in Urdu, Punjabi, Saraiki and Sindhi languages. She has sung over a thousand songs in her career until 2016.

Initially Humaira Channa was a substitute singer for Naheed Akhtar during the 1980s, after Naheed Akhtar decided to get married and retire from the Pakistani film industry. In 2017, some of the iconic playback singers of Pakistan were complaining about lack of work due to introduction of new trends in Pakistani film industry where the emphasis now was on pop musicians and music bands instead of film songs that these playback singers used to sing.

Humaira Channa has gone on concert tours to the United States, Canada, United Arab Emirates, Bangladesh and across Europe.

== Television ==
- Silver Jubilee (PTV entertainment show with Anwar Maqsood) (1983)

Humaira Channa has sung the title songs for the following television drama series:

- Rishtay Mohabbaton Kay – Hum TV (2009)
- Shikan – PTV (2010)
- Kaash Aisa Ho ARY TV (2013)
- Naagin (Pakistani TV series) (2017 Geo Kahani)

== Coke Studio (Pakistan) ==
- (2014) Ambwa Talay alongside Javed Bashir and Mekaal Hasan Band
- (2014) Phool Banro alongside Abbas Ali Khan
- (2017) Mujh Se Pehli Si Muhabbat Mere Mehboob Na Maang alongside Nabeel Shaukat Ali

== Awards and recognition ==
- Nigar Awards winner six times in (1986, 1989, 1991, 1993, 1994 and 1997) for Best Female Playback Singer.
- Pakistani TV (PTV) Best Singer Award in 1986
- Pride of Performance Award by the President of Pakistan in 2017.
