= Sultan Rahi filmography =

Sultan Rahi (Urdu: ﺳﻠﻄﺎﻥ ﺭﺍﮨﯽ; June 24, 1938 – January 9, 1996) was a Pakistani actor, producer and screenwriter.

He established himself as one of the leading and most successful actors of Pakistani and Punjabi cinema, and received a reputation as Pakistan's "Clint Eastwood".

During a career spanning 40 years, he acted in some 703 Punjabi films and 100 Urdu films, winning around 160 awards.

Rahi earned two Nigar Awards for his work in Babul (1971) and Basheera (1972).

In 1975 he portrayed the character of Maula Jatt in Wehshi Jatt, winning his third Nigar Award. He reprised the role in its sequel Maula Jatt.

Some of his other films include Sher Khan, Chan Veryam, Kaley Chore, The Godfather, Sharif Badmash and Wehshi Gujjar. The following is a. Complete list of his films:

Color legend
Punjabi
Urdu

== 1950s ==
Year	Date	Film	Director	Language	Notes
1956	14 September	Baghi	Ashfaq Malik	Urdu	Extra
1956	21 September	Wehshi	Munawar H. Qasim	Urdu	Extra
1956	5 October	Hatim	Daud Chand	Urdu	Extra
1957	22 February	Yakke Wali	M.J. Rana	Punjabi	Extra
1957	22 February	Daata	Syed Atta Ullah Shah Hashmi	Urdu	Extra
1957	2 May	Palkan	Amin Malik	Punjabi	Extra
1957	9 July	Murad	Daud Chand	Punjabi	Extra
1957	6 September	Sardar	M.S. Daar	Urdu	Extra
1957	11 October	Zulfan	Agha Hussaini	Urdu	Extra
1958	21 April	Zehr-e-Ishq	Masood Parvez	Urdu	Extra
1958	29 June	Rukhsana	Fazal Deen	Urdu	Extra
1958	22 August	Darbar	Riaz Ahmad	Urdu	Extra
1958	29 August	Mumtaz	Mohammad Ali	Urdu	Extra
1958	19 September	Pehla Qadam	A.G. Thawni	Urdu	Extra
1958	31 October	Akhri Dao	A.K. Chodhary	Urdu	Extra
1958	14 November	Aadmi	Luqman	Urdu	Extra
1958	21 November	Jagga	Saqlain Rizvi	Punjabi	Extra
1959	10 April	Yaar Beli	Khalil Qaisar	Punjabi	Extra
1959	10 April	16 Aanay	Agha Hussaini	Urdu	Extra
1959	10 April	Sahara	A. Rauf	Urdu	Extra
1959	10 April	Bodi Shah	S.M. Ahmad Qalandar	Punjabi	Extra
1959	18 June	Raaz	Humayun Mirza	Urdu	Extra
1959	18 June	Nagin	Khalil Qaisar	Urdu	Extra
1959	7 August	Lalkar	T.H. Riaz	Urdu	Extra
1959	11 September	Shera	M.J. Rana	Punjabi	Extra
1959	25 September	Himmat	Amin Malik	Urdu	Extra
1959	20 November	Gumrah	Anwar Kemal Pasha	Urdu	Extra

== 1960s ==
Year	Date	Film	Director	Language	Notes
1960	29 March	Yeh Dunya	Nazir Sufi	Urdu	Extra
1960	29 March	Watan	Anwar Kemal Pasha	Urdu	Extra
1960	29 March	Bhabhi	Syed Atta Ullah Shah Hashmi	Urdu	Extra
1960	29 April	Ayaz	Luqman	Urdu	Extra
1960	6 June	Khyber Mail	Agha Hussaini	Urdu	Extra
1960	6 June	Dil-e-Nadan	Najam Naqvi	Urdu	Extra
1960	2 December	Daku Ki Larki	Saleem Ahmad	Urdu	Extra
1960	23 December	Saheli	S.M. Yousuf	Urdu	Extra
1961	17 March	Farishta	Luqman	Urdu	Extra
1961	28 April	Habu	Rahim Gul	Urdu	Extra
1961	26 May	Mangti	Ashraf Khan	Punjabi	Extra
1961	26 May	Taj Aur Talwar	Riaz Ahmed Raju	Urdu	Extra
1961	29 December	Gulfam	S. Suleman	Urdu	Extra
1962	9 March	Darwaza	Saifuddin Saif	Urdu	Extra
1962	9 March	Shake Hand	Baqar Rizvi	Urdu	Extra
1962	15 May	Qaidi	Najam Naqvi	Urdu	Extra
1962	22 June	Ajnabi	Ashfaq Malik	Urdu	Extra
1962	10 August	Aulad	S.M. Yousuf	Urdu	
1962	14 September	Zarina	Agha Hussaini	Urdu	Extra
1962	5 October	Jamalo	M.J. Rana	Punjabi	Extra
1962	19 October	Susral	Riaz Shahed	Urdu	Extra
1962	28 December	Barsat Mein	Diljeet Mirza	Urdu	Guest
1963	26 February	Ishq Par Zor Nahin	Sharif Nayyar	Urdu	Extra
1963	3 May	Baji	S. Suleman	Urdu	Extra
1963	3 May	Barat	Rahim Gul	Urdu	Extra
1963	4 October	Neelam	A. Hameed	Urdu	Extra
1963	1 November	Dulhan	S.M. Yousuf	Urdu	
1963	29 November	Ik Tera Sahara	Najam Naqvi	Urdu	Extra
1964	15 February	Khandan	Riaz Ahmad	Urdu	Extra
1964	3 April	Mamta	Saqlain Razvi	Urdu	
1964	23 April	Gehra Dagh	Ashfaq Malik	Urdu	Extra
1964	4 September	Pyar Ki Saza	Mamnoon Hussain	Urdu	Extra
1964	9 October	Ashiana	S.M. Yousuf	Urdu	Extra
1964	23 October	Maa Ka Pyar	Syed Zia Ullah Shah	Urdu	Extra
1964	13 November	Baghi Sipahi	Agha Hussaini	Urdu	Extra
1964	13 November	Chhoti Behan	A.H. Siddiqi	Urdu	Extra
1964	27 November	Ghaddar	Riaz Ahmad	Urdu	
1965	3 February	Aisa Bhi Hota Hai	Fazal Ahmad Karim Fazli	Urdu	Extra
1965	3 February	Fareb	M. Haziq	Urdu	Extra
1965	12 March	Doctor	Shaukat Hashmi	Urdu	Extra
1965	2 April	Sartaj	Munshi Dil	Urdu	
1965	12 April	Faishon	Shabab Keranvi	Urdu	Extra
1965	12 April	Kalay Log	Muzaffar Tahir	Urdu	Extra
1965	25 June	Devdas	Khawaja Sarfaraz	Urdu	Extra
1965	30 July	Jhanjhar	Zia Ullah	Punjabi	
1965	3 September	Heer Sial	Jafar Bukhari	Punjabi	Extra
1965	12 November	Nache Nagin Baje Been	Haidar Chodhary	Urdu	
1965	19 November	Jeedar	M.J. Rana	Punjabi	Extra
1965	17 December	Khota Paisa	Raja Hafeez	Urdu	Extra
1966	24 January	Qabeela	Riaz Ahmad	Urdu	Guest
1966	18 February	Majhay Di Jatti	Muzaffar Tahir	Punjabi	Extra
1966	25 February	Moajza	M.A. Rasheed	Urdu	Guest
1966	4 March	Watan Ka Sipahi	Shabab Keranvi	Urdu	
1966	11 March	Aag Ka Darya	Humayun Mirza	Urdu	Extra
1966	2 April	Sarhad	Masood Parvez	Urdu	Extra
1966	15 April	Khalifa	Waheed Dar	Punjabi	
1966	3 June	Janj	Zia Ullah	Punjabi	Extra
1966	5 August	Insan	Qadeer Ghori	Urdu	Extra
1966	19 August	Baghi Sardar	Zahoor Raja	Urdu	
1966	16 September	Ghar Ka Ujala	Riaz Ahmad Raju	Urdu	Extra
1966	14 October	Husn Ka Chor	Saqlain Razvi	Urdu	Extra
1966	21 October	Koh-e-Noor	Agha Hussaini	Urdu	Extra
1966	11 November	Dard-e-Dil	N.K. Zubairi	Urdu	Extra
1966	11 November	Payel Ki Jhankar	Najam Naqvi	Urdu	Extra
1966	25 November	Janbaz	M. Akram	Urdu	Extra
1966	2 December	Aaina	Shabab Keranvi	Urdu	Extra
1967	12 January	Jigri Yaar	Iftikhar Khan	Punjabi	Extra
1967	12 January	Main Woh Nahin	Qadeer Malik	Urdu	Extra
1967	12 January	Nadira	Riaz Ahmad	Urdu	Extra
1967	10 February	Sajda	S.A. Hafiz	Urdu	Extra
1967	24 February	Insaniyat	Shabab Keranvi	Urdu	Guest
1967	10 March	Chacha Ji	Waheed Dar	Punjabi	
1967	10 March	Chattan	Ashiq Bhatti	Urdu	Extra
1967	22 March	Dil Da Jani	Riaz Ahmad Raju	Punjabi	Extra
1967	22 March	Elaan	Ashfaq Malik	Urdu	Extra
1967	5 May	Hatim Tai	Akbar Ali Akkoo	Urdu	
1967	5 May	Chann Ji	A. Hameed	Punjabi	
1967	2 June	Imam Din Gohavia	M. Saleem	Punjabi	Extra
1967	7 July	Akbara	Rasheed Akhtar	Punjabi	
1967	15 September	Shola Aur Shabnam	K. Khursheed	Urdu	Guest
1967	10 November	Sitamgar	Aziz Meeruti	Urdu	
1968	2 January	Baalam	Al-Hamid	Urdu	
1968	2 January	Lala Rukh	Aziz Meeruti	Urdu	
1968	26 January	Zalim	Agha Hussaini	Urdu	
1968	1 March	Janab-e-Aali	Diljeet Mirza	Punjabi	
1968	1 March	Mahal	Luqman	Urdu	
1968	19 April	14 Saal	Ashraf Khan	Urdu	
1968	10 May	Ek Musafir Ek Haseena	Jameel Akhtar	Urdu	
1968	10 May	Har Fun Maula	Rasheed Akhtar	Punjabi	
1968	17 May	Josh-e-Inteqam	M. Ashraf Ali	Urdu	
1968	17 May	Main Kahan Manzil Kahan	Humayun Mirza	Urdu	
1968	24 May	Badla	Haidar Chodhary	Punjabi	
1968	7 June	Ik Si Maa	Waheed Dar	Punjabi	
1968	28 June	Sohna	Haidar Chodhary	Punjabi	
1968	9 August	Commander	Jafar Malik	Urdu	
1968	9 August	Mujhe Jeene Do	Razzaq	Urdu	Extra
1968	9 August	Shehnai	Syed Kemal	Urdu	
1968	23 August	Dara	Aslam Dar	Urdu	
1968	4 October	Main Zindi Hoon	S. Saleem	Urdu	Extra
1968	8 November	Pyar Da Vairi	Hussain Babu	Punjabi	Guest
1968	15 November	Aawara	Dilshad Malik	Urdu	
1968	29 November	Shahi Mahal	M. Ashraf Ali	Urdu	
1968	22 December	Panj Darya	Jafar Malik	Punjabi	Extra
1968	22 December	Nadir Khan	M. Hanif Kardar	Urdu	
1968	22 December	Taj Mahal	S.T. Zaidi	Urdu	
1969	24 January	Dilbar Jani	Riaz Bukhari	Punjabi	
1969	14 February	Aukha Jatt	M.J. Rana	Punjabi	
1969	27 February	Aasra	Raza Mir	Urdu	
1969	9 May	Bhaian Di Jori	Khalifa Saeed Ahmad	Punjabi	
1969	9 May	Diya Aur Toofan	Rangeela	Urdu	Guest
1969	23 May	Ran Murid	Khursheed Chodhary	Punjabi	
1969	6 June	Daastan	Rattan Kumar	Urdu	
1969	3 October	Sheran De Puttar Sher	S.A. Bukhari	Punjabi	Guest
1969	10 October	Qoul Qarar	Haidar Chodhary	Punjabi	
1969	10 October	Shabistan	Khan Aziz	Urdu	Guest
1969	17 October	Pathar Te Leek	Jafar Malik	Punjabi	
1969	24 October	Dhee Rani	Arshad Kazmi	Punjabi	
1969	24 October	Ghabroo Putt Punjab De	Ubaid Qadri	Punjabi	
1969	24 October	Koonj Vichhar Gayi	Haidar Chodhary	Punjabi	
1969	21 November	Dhol Sipahi	Baba Qalandar	Punjabi	Extra
1969	26 December	Saza	Humayun Mirza	Urdu	

== 1970s ==
Year	Film	Language	Director	Reference(s)
1970	Rangeela	Urdu		
1972	2 Pattar Anaran Day	Punjabi	Haidar Chodhary	
1972	Khan Chacha	Punjabi	M. Akram	
1972	Khoon Pasina	Punjabi	Hassan Askari	
1972	Ucha Shamla Jatt Da	Punjabi	Khan Aziz	
1972	Eid Da Chann	Punjabi	M.J. Rana	
1972	Melay Sajna Day	Punjabi	Zia Hashmi	
1972	Patola	Punjabi	S.M. Ahmad	
1972	Hashu Khan	Punjabi	S.A. Bukhari	
1972	Sir Da Sain	Punjabi	Azmat Nawaz	
1972	Jagday Rehna	Punjabi	Iqbal Kashmiri	
1972	Sajjan Dushman	Punjabi	Kaifee	
1972	Changa Khoon	Punjabi	Malik Amin	
1972	Basheera	Punjabi	Aslam Dar	
1972	Sir Dhar Di Bazi	Punjabi	Hassan Askari	
1972	Heera	Punjabi	Hassan Askari	
1972	Zindagi Kay Melay	Punjabi	Nasir	
1972	Niazm	Punjabi	Haidar	
1972	Sultan	Punjabi	M. Akram	
1972	Insan Ik Tamasha	Punjabi	Altaf Hussain	
1972	Jangu	Punjabi	M. Saleem	
1972	Raju	Punjabi	Kashmiri	
1972	Thah	Punjabi	Diljeet Mirza	
1973	Khoon Da Darya	Punjabi	Abid Shujaa	
1973	Zarq Khan	Punjabi	Aslam Dar	
1973	Jawani Di Hawa	Punjabi	Raja Hafeez	
1973	Jithay Wagdi Ay Ravi	Punjabi	Rasheed Chodhary	
1973	Ik Madari	Punjabi	Sagheer Ahmad	
1973	Shado	Punjabi	Zaki.B.A	
1973	Insan Aur Gadha	Urdu	Syed Kemal	
1973	Bala Gujjar	Punjabi	Haidar Chodhary	
1973	Sadhu Aur Sheitan	Urdu	Jahangir Bhatti	
1973	Khoon Bolda A	Urdu	Zaki B.A	
1973	Banarsi Thug	Punjabi	Iqbal Kashmiri	
1973	Pehla War	Punjabi	Diljeet Mirza	
1973	Dharti Sheran Di	Punjabi	Hamid Usmani	
1974	Zulm Kaday Nein Phalda	Punjabi	Mohsin Jamali	
1974	Dil Lagi	Urdu	Aslam Dar	
1974	Nadra	Punjabi	Ejaz Mir	
1974	Qatil Te Mafroor	Punjabi	A. Riaz	
1974	Manji Kithay Dahwan	Punjabi	Haroon Paasha	
1974	Kei Saal Pehlay	Urdu	M. Dilawar	
1974	Sidha Rasta	Punjabi	M. Akram	
1974	Rano	Punjabi	Khalid Chodhary	
1974	Sasta Khoon Mehnga Pani	Punjabi	Iqbal Kashmiri	
1974	Khana Day Khan Prohnay	Punjabi	Anwar Kemal Pasha	
1974	Babul Sadqay Teray	Punjabi	Aslam Dar	
1974	Sohna Mukhra	Punjabi	Jafar Malik	
1974	Suhag Mera Lahu Tera	Punjabi	Aslam Dar	
1975	Ustad	Punjabi	Wazir Ali	
1975	Sharif Badmash	Punjabi	Iqbal Kashmiri	
1975	Wehshi Jutt	Punjabi	Hassan Askari	
1975	Shaheed	Punjabi	Masood Asghar	
1975	Balwant Kur	Punjabi	M. Saleem	
1975	Jor Tur Da Badmash	Punjabi	Ubaid Malik	
1975	Sheda Pastol	Punjabi	Sharif Ali	
1975	Khooni	Punjabi	Waheed Dar	
1975	Doghla	Punjabi	Syed Raza Zaidi	
1975	Jailor Te Qaidi	Punjabi	Daud Butt	
1976	Mout Khed Jawana Di	Punjabi	Aslam Irani	
1976	Yaar Da Sehra	Punjabi	Iqbal Kashmiri	
1976	Akhar	Punjabi	Khawaja Sarfaraz	
1976	Ultimatum	Punjabi	Kaifee	
1976	Rastay Ka Pathar	Punjabi	M.A. Rasheed	
1976	Toofan	Punjabi	Hassan Askari	
1976	Pindiwal	Punjabi	Zahoor Hussain Geelani	
1976	Wardat	Punjabi	Diljeet Mirza	
1976	Chitra Te Shera	Punjabi	Iqbal Kashmiri	
1976	Baghi Te Farangi	Punjabi	Arshad Mirza	
1976	License	Punjabi	Aslam Irani	
1976	Truck Driver	Punjabi	Sheikh Hassan	
1976	Jagga Gujjar	Punjabi	Kaifee	
1976	Shera Te Babbra	Punjabi	Jameel Akhtar	
1976	Ann Daata	Punjabi	Iqbal Yousuf	
1976	Ghairat	Punjabi	Javed Hassan	
1976	Ajj Da Badmash	Urdu	Akram Khan	
1976	Reshma Te Shera	Punjabi	Haidar Chodhary	
1976	Charagh Bahadur	Punjabi	Parvez Rana	
1976	Gangu Puttar Maa Da	Punjabi	Hafeez Ahmad	
1976	Thuggan Dey Thug	Punjabi	Iqbal Kashmiri	
1976	Taqdeer Kahan Lay Ayi	Punjabi	Nasir Hussain	
1977	Akhri Medaan	Punjabi	Hassan Askari	
1977	Dada	Punjabi	Daud Butt	
1977	Jurm Main Keeta Si	Punjabi	Mohammad Sarwar	
1977	Jasoos	Urdu	Iqbal Yousuf	
1977	Teen Badshah	Punjabi	Zahoor Hussain Geelani	
1977	Danka	Punjabi	Daud Butt	
1977	Lahori Badshah	Punjabi	Jahangir Qaisar	
1977	Jeera Sain	Punjabi	Younis Malik	
1977	Sadqay Teri Mout Tun	Punjabi	Inayat Hussain Bhatti	
1977	Intiqam De Agg	Punjabi	Maqsood Ayaz	
1977	Sher Babbar	Punjabi	Akram Khan	
1977	Qanoon	Punjabi	Hassan Askari	
1977	Shaheen	Urdu	Iqbal Kashmiri	
1977	Dosti Te Dushmani	Punjabi	Arif Chodhary	
1977	Akhari Muqabla	Urdu	Khalifa Saeed	
1977	Ghairat di Mout	Punjabi	Naseem Haidar	
1977	Kon Sharif Kon Badmash	Punjabi	Zahoor Hussain Geelani	
1977	Khamosh	Punjabi	Mohammad Tariq	
1977	Meray Badshah	Punjabi	Ali Akbar	
1978	Nidarr	Punjabi	Khawaja Sarfaraz	
1978	Ghunda	Punjabi	Masood Bin Aslam	
1978	Chori Mera Kaam	Urdu	Iqbal Kashmiri	
1978	Lathi Charge	Punjabi	Idrees Khan	
1978	Elaan	Punjabi	Kaifee	
1978	Chal waal	Pashto	Shaukat Yousuf	
1978	Chaman Khan	Punjabi	Nazir Hussain	
1978	Heera Te Basheera	Punjabi	Faisal Ejaz	
1978	Shera Dakiet	Punjabi	Daud Butt	
1978	Do Daku	Punjabi	Rehmat Ali	
1978	Ibrat	Punjabi	Hameed Chodhary	
1978	Lakha	Punjabi	Shafiq Ahmad	
1978	Tax	Punjabi	Javed Khan	
1978	Hera Pehri	Punjabi	Shaukat Yousuf	
1978	Curfew Order	Punjabi	Zahoor Hussain Geelani	
1978	Ranga Daku	Punjabi	Arshad Mirza	
1978	Boycott	Punjabi	M. Akram	
1978	Sharif Ziddi	Punjabi	Iqbal Kashmiri	
1978	Lalkara	Punjabi	Javed Hassan	
1979	Parwarish	Urdu	S.A. Hafiz	
1979	Maula Jatt	Punjabi	Younis Malik	
1979	Main Nalaiq Aan	Punjabi	Zahoor Hussain Geelani	
1979	Goga Sher	Punjabi	Younis Malik	
1979	Hathiar	Punjabi	M. Akram	
1979	Main Sharif Aan	Urdu	Zahoor Hussain Geelani	
1979	Jeenay Ki Saza	Urdu	Hassan Askari	
1979	Makhan Khan	Punjabi	Maqbool Ahmad	
1979	Ghair Hazir	Punjabi	Parvez Rana	
1979	Jatt Da Kharak	Punjabi	Hassan Askari	
1979	Ziddi Jatt	Punjabi	Younis Malik	
1979	Butt Bahadur	Punjabi	Tariq Mehmood Butt	
1979	Permit	Punjabi	Imtiaz Quresh	
1979	Aurat Raaj	Urdu	Rangeela	
1979	Dada Pota	Punjabi	Hassan Askari	
1979	Dangle	Punjabi	Kaifee	
1979	Ghunda Act	Punjabi	Masood Butt	
1979	Khana Jangi	Punjabi	M. Akram	
1979	Nizam Daku	Punjabi	Waheed Dar	
1979	Wehshi Gujjar	Punjabi	Younis Malik	
1979	Waqt Da Badshah	Punjabi	Azmat Nawaz	
1979	Order	Punjabi	Zahoor Hussain Geelani	
1979	Jail Da Badshah	Punjabi	Nasir Hussain	
1979	General Bakht Khan	Urdu	Sarshar Akhtar Malik	
1979	Dadagir	Punjabi	M. Haroon Paasha	
1979	Dehshat	Punjabi	M. Anees Bhatti	
1979	Gullu Badshah	Punjabi	Younis Rathor	
1979	Iqbal-E-Jurm	Punjabi	Naseem Haidar	
1979	Jatt Soorma	Punjabi	Arshad Mirza	
1979	Aag	Urdu	Hassan Askari	
1979	Machlay Khan	Punjabi	Naseem Haidar	

== 1980s ==
Year	Film	Language	Director	Reference(s)
1980	Dushman Mera Yaar	Punjabi	Akhtar Saleem	
1980	Harasat	Punjabi	Agha Hussaini	
1980	Behram Daku	Punjabi	Rauf Abbasi	
1980	Qissa Khawani	Hindko	Tanvir Qateel	
1980	Raju Rangbaz	Punjabi	Daud Butt	
1981	Dushman Dar	Punjabi	Masood Asghar	
1981	Shrat	Punjabi	Riaz Ahmad Raju	
1981	Khan-e-Azam	Punjabi	Younis Malik	
1981	Anokha Daaj	Punjabi	Aslam Dar	
1981	Sher Median Da	Punjabi	M. Akram	
1981	Sheran De Puttar Sher	Punjabi	Masood Butt	
1981	Athra Puttar	Punjabi	Altaf Hussain	
1981	Chan Veryam	Punjabi	Jahangir Qaisar	
1981	Milay Ga Zulm Da Badla	Punjabi	Kaifee	
1981	Sala Sahab	Punjabi	Altaf Hussain	
1981	Sher Khan	Punjabi	Younis Malik	
1981	Jatt Da Vair	Punjabi	Younis Malik	
1981	Dara Sikandar	Punjabi	Rehmat Ali	
1981	Veryam	Punjabi	Arshad Mirza	
1981	Akhri Qurbani	Punjabi	Zahoor Hussain Geelani	
1981	Athra Te Jeedar	Punjabi	Javed Hassan	
1981	Chan Suraj	Punjabi	Rauf Abbasi	
1981	Khar Damagh	Punjabi	Daud Butt	
1981	Qanoon Shikan	Urdu	Quraish Chodhary	
1981	Basheera Te Qanoon	Punjabi	Saeed Daar	
1981	Jeedar	Punjabi	Kaifee	
1981	Muftbar	Punjabi	Hassan Askari	
1981	Rustam	Punjabi	Iqbal Kashmiri	
1981	Zehreela Dushman	Punjabi	Ilyas Kashmiri Ahmad	
1981	Chhanga Te Manga	Punjabi	Haidar	
1981	Jatt In London	Punjabi	Younis Malik	
1981	100 Rifles	Urdu	Sharif Ali	
1982	Bharia Mela	Punjabi	Masood Butt	
1982	Wehshi Daku	Punjabi	Ali Tahir	
1982	Kinara	Urdu	Hassan Askari	
1982	Pasbaan	Dubbed	Iqbal Yousuf	
1982	Ik Doli	Punjabi	M. Akram	
1982	Do Bhiga Zamin	Punjabi	Younis Malik	
1982	Maidan	Punjabi	Masood Butt	
1982	Haider Sultan	Punjabi	Rehmat Ali	
1982	Shan	Punjabi	M. Akram	
1982	Charda Suraj	Punjabi	Basir Rana	
1982	Visa Dubai da	Punjabi	Javed Raza	
1982	Ik Ziddi Veer	Punjabi	Zahoor Hussain Geelani	
1982	Shera	Punjabi	S. Jamsheri	
1983	Heera Faqeera	Punjabi	Aizaz Syed	
1983	Akhri Dushman	Punjabi	Kaifee	
1983	Jatt Tay Dogar	Punjabi	Imtiaz Quresh	
1983	Des Pardes	Punjabi	Iftikhar Khan	
1983	Do Ziddi	Punjabi	Younis Rathor	
1983	Jatt Gujjar Te Natt	Punjabi	Arshad Mirza	
1983	Moti Dogar	Punjabi	Jahangir Qaisar	
1983	Qudrat	Punjabi	Altaf Hussain	
1983	Raka	Punjabi	Mumtaz Ali Khan	
1983	Murad Khan	Punjabi	Waheed Dar	
1983	Heera Moti	Punjabi	Sarwar Khayal	
1983	Toofan Te Toofan	Punjabi	Jahangir Qaisar	
1983	Chorun Qutab	Punjabi	M. Akram	
1983	Lawaris	Punjabi	Altaf Hussain	
1983	Shagird Moulay Jatt Da	Punjabi	Aizaz Syed	
1983	Khan Veer	Punjabi	Mohammad Tariq	
1983	Baghi Sher	Punjabi	Aslam Dar	
1983	Wadda Khan	Punjabi	Diljeet Mirza	
1983	Rustam Te Khan	Punjabi	Altaf Hussain	
1983	Dara Baloch	Punjabi	Masood Butt	
1983	Sher Mama	Punjabi	Imtiaz Quresh	
1984	Jagga Tay Shera	Punjabi	Imtiaz Quresh	
1984	Shanakhti Card	Punjabi	S. Jamsheri	
1984	Hathan Wich Hath	Punjabi	Iqbal Kashmiri	
1984	Dada Ustad	Punjabi	Hasnain	
1984	Muqaddar ka Sikandar	Urdu	Iqbal Kashmiri	
1984	Iman Te Farangi	Punjabi	Khelifa Saeed	
1984	Haibat Khan	Punjabi	Zahoor Hussain Geelani	
1984	Kalia	Punjabi	Waheed Dar	
1984	Lal Toofan	Punjabi	M. Akram	
1984	Sholay	Punjabi	Younis Malik	
1984	Commander	Punjabi	S.A. Bukhari	
1984	Jagga Te Reshma	Punjabi	Younis Malik	
1984	Taqat	Punjabi	Kaifee	
1984	Barood	Urdu	Raye Farooq	
1984	Ucha Shamla Jatt Da	Punjabi	Aslam Irani	
1984	Baz Shehbaz	Punjabi	Altaf Hussain	
1984	Taawan	Punjabi	Basheer Rana	
1984	Sajawal Daku	Punjabi	Agha Hussaini	
1984	Pukar	Punjabi	Aizaz Saeed	
1984	Chann Cheeta	Punjabi	Masood Asghar	
1984	Dil Maa Da	Punjabi	Mohammad Saleem	
1984	Lagaan	Punjabi	Basheer Rana	
1984	Laraka	Punjabi	M. Aslam	
1985	Black Mail	Punjabi	Iqbal Kashmiri	
1985	Chann Baloch	Punjabi	Parvez Rana	
1985	Lakha Daku	Punjabi	Altaf Hussain	
1985	Maa Puttar	Punjabi	Altaf Hussain	
1985	Qismat	Punjabi	Iqbal Kashmiri	
1985	Angara	Punjabi	M. Akram	
1985	Ajab Khan	Punjabi	Waheed Dar	
1985	Sheesh Naag	Punjabi	Imtiaz Quresh	
1985	Sauday Bazi	Punjabi	Nasir Hussain	
1985	Khuddar	Punjabi	M. Akram	
1985	Ghulami	Punjabi	Hasnain	
1985	Jagga	Punjabi	Masood Butt	
1985	Shah Behram	Punjabi	Kaifee	
1985	Ziddi Khan	Punjabi	Deedar	
1985	Halaku Te Khan	Punjabi	Aqeel Gaba	
1985	Direct Hawaldar	Punjabi	Irfan Khoosat	
1986	Zulm Da Toofan	Punjabi	Younis Rathor	
1986	Mama Saray Shehar Da	Punjabi	Majeed Rana	
1986	Baghi Sipahi	Punjabi	Fiaz Sheikh	
1986	Griftari	Punjabi	Imtiaz Qureshi	
1986	2 Daku	Pashto	Rehmat Ali	
1986	Duwa Dakuwan	Pashto	Rehmat Ali	
1986	Chann Te Surma	Punjabi	Masood Butt	
1986	Do Qaidi	Punjabi	Amin Riaz	
1986	Qaidi	Punjabi	Masood Butt	
1986	Yeh Adam	Punjabi	Irshad Sajid	
1986	Chann Bahadur	Punjabi	Altaf Hussain	
1986	Insaaf	Punjabi	Raoof Abbasi	
1986	Jitt Qanoon Di	Punjabi	Iqbal Bhatti	
1986	Akbar Khan	Punjabi	Hassan Askari	
1986	Chall So Chall	Punjabi	Younis Malik	
1986	Charhda Toofan	Punjabi	Masood Butt	
1986	Hitler	Punjabi	Idrees Khan	
1986	Qarz	Punjabi	Masood Butt	
1986	Puttar Shahiye Da	Punjabi	Daud Butt	
1986	Agg Da Darya	Punjabi	Jahangir Qaisar	
1986	Kali Basti	Punjabi	Akram Khan	
1986	Akhri Jung	Punjabi	Younis Malik	
1986	Suhagan	Punjabi	Hasnain	
1986	Sanjhi Hathkari	Punjabi	M. Akram	
1986	Dara Gujjar	Punjabi	Imtiaz Quresh	
1986	Haq Sach	Punjabi	Kaifee	
1986	Puttar Sheran Day	Punjabi	Daud Butt	
1986	Qeemat	Punjabi	Haidar Chodhary	
1986	Malanga	Punjabi	Raseed Dogar	
1986	Mela	Punjabi	Hassan Aksri	
1986	Balocha Te Daku	Punjabi	Asif Khan	
1986	Sher Bahadur	Punjabi	M. Aslam	
1986	Kon Zabardast	Punjabi	Idrees Khan	
1987	Jugnu	Punjabi	Faiz Malik	
1987	Doli Te Hathkari	Punjabi	Safdar Hussain	
1987	Moti Sher	Punjabi	Imtiaz Qureshi	
1987	Gernail Singh	Punjabi	Younis Malik	
1987	Sangal	Punjabi	Mohammad Aslam Malik	
1987	Zalzala	Punjabi	Iqbal Yousuf	
1987	Kala Toofan	Punjabi	Younis Malik	
1987	Jabar Khan	Punjabi	Altaf Hussain	
1987	Rajput	Punjabi	Hasnain	
1987	Allah Rakha	Punjabi	Masood Butt	
1987	Faqeeria	Punjabi	Waheed Dar	
1987	Silsila	Punjabi	Aslam Dar	
1987	Dulari	Punjabi	Haidar Chodhary	
1987	Janbaaz	Punjabi	Altaf Hussain	
1987	Himmatwala	Punjabi	Aziz Tabassum	
1987	Badaal	Punjabi	Aziz Tabassum	
1987	Son of AnnData	Punjabi	Aziz Tabassum	
1987	Nachay Nagin	Punjabi	Haidar Chodhary	
1987	Khanu Khan	Punjabi	Liaqat Ali Khan	
1987	Bazi	Punjabi	Sangeeta	
1987	Tiger	Punjabi	Iqbal Kashmiri	
1987	Kalu	Punjabi	Mohammad Rasheed Dogar	
1988	Moula Bakhsh	Punjabi	Younis Malik	
1988	Garm Lahoo	Punjabi	M. Sharif	
1988	Elaan-E-Jang	Punjabi	Mohammad Sarwar	
1988	Dilawar Khan	Punjabi	Abid Shujaa	
1988	Allah Ditta	Punjabi	Iqbal Kashmiri	
1988	Jatt Majhay Da	Punjabi	Masood Butt	
1988	Shehanshah	Double version	Sangeeta	
1988	Mafroor	Punjabi	Hassan Askari	
1988	Qatil	Punjabi	Hassan Askari	
1988	Haseena 420	Punjabi	Masood Butt	
1988	Hukumat	Punjabi	Haidar Chodhary	
1988	Basheera In Trouble	Punjabi	Javed Hassan	
1988	Tohfa	Punjabi	Daud Butt	
1988	Allah Dad	Punjabi	Masood Butt	
1988	Taqatwar	Punjabi	Hasnain	
1988	Mundri	Punjabi	Altaf Hussain	
1988	Qismat Wala	Punjabi	Agha Hussaini	
1988	Noori	Punjabi	Altaf Hussain	
1988	Sheru Te Sultan	Punjabi	Zaki Jaran	
1988	Jung	Punjabi	Masood Butt	
1988	Sherni	Double version	Daud Butt	
1988	Roti	Punjabi	Idress Khan	
1988	Hunter Wali	Punjabi	Iqbal Kashmiri	
1989	Jaal	Punjabi	Daud Butt	
1989	Jan Nisar	Punjabi	Daud Butt	
1989	Sikandra	Punjabi	Altaf Hussain	
1989	Super Girl	Punjabi	Mohammad Aslam Malik	
1989	Qatil Haseena	Punjabi	Khalifa Saeed Ahmad	
1989	Sarfarosh	Punjabi	Iqbal Kashmiri	
1989	Moula Sain	Punjabi	Masood Butt	
1989	Yarana	Punjabi	Younis Malik	
1989	Aakhri Qatal	Punjabi	Aslam Irani	
1989	Bilawal	Punjabi	Kaifee	
1989	Kalka	Punjabi	Shahid Rana	
1989	Madam Bawri	Double version	Nazrul Islam	
1989	Zabardast	Punjabi	Haidar Chodhary	
1989	Roop Ki Rani	Urdu	Jan Mohammad Jamman	
1989	Karmu Dada	Punjabi	Saleem Jafri	
1989	Karma	Punjabi	Jahangir Qaisar	
1989	Dakiet	Punjabi	Jahangir Qaisar	
1989	Rakhwala	Punjabi	Waheed Dar	
1989	Achhu 302	Punjabi	Altaf Hussain	
1989	Changeza	Punjabi	Daud Butt	
1989	Mera Challenge	Punjabi	Azmat Nawaz	
1989	Rangeelay Jasoos	Double version	Iqbal Kashmiri	
1989	Khuda Bux	Punjabi	Nasir Hussain	
1989	Nagin Jogi	Double version	Masood Butt	
1989	Sheran Di Maa	Punjabi	Masood Butt	
1989	Yamla Jatt	Punjabi	Syed Raza Zaidi	
1989	Ameer Khan	Double version	Younis Malik	
1989	Jang-E-Jang	Punjabi	M. Aslam	
1989	Mazdoor	Punjabi	Safdar Hussain	
1989	Zakhmi Aurat	Double version	Iqbal Kashmiri	
1989	Lalu	Punjabi	Faisal Ejaz	
1989	Dushman Dada	Punjabi	Rai Farooque	
1989	Meri Hathjori	Punjabi	Masood Butt	
1989	Mujrim	Punjabi	Haidar Chodhary	
1989	Allah Khair	Punjabi	Mohammad Ashraf Butt	
1989	Deevani Disco Di	Punjabi	Ejaz Hussain	

== 1990s ==
Year	Film	Language	Director	Source
1990	Hoshiar	Punjabi	Haidar Chodhary	
1990	Shera Baloch	Punjabi	Imtiaz Quresh	
1990	Allah Waris	Punjabi	Haidar Chodhary	
1990	Jurrat	Punjabi	Waheed Dar	
1990	Insaniyat Kay Dushman	Urdu	Hassnain	
1990	Babul	Punjabi	Parvez Rana	
1990	Palay Khan	Punjabi	Mumtaz Ali Khan	
1990	Governor	Punjabi	Idrees Khan	
1990	Daku Haseena	Punjabi	Javed Raza	
1990	Lutera	Punjabi	M. Aslam	
1990	Kali Charn	Punjabi	Khalifa Saeed Ahmad	
1990	Sultana	Punjabi	Masood Butt	
1990	Miss Cleopatra	Double version	Mohammad Javed Fazil	
1990	Jailor	Punjabi	Daud Butt	
1990	Hifazat	Punjabi	Haidar Chodhary	
1990	Puttar Jaggay Da	Punjabi	Hassan Askari	
1990	Khandani Badmash	Punjabi	Safdar Hussain	
1990	Waqt	Punjabi	Idrees Khan	
1990	Loha	Punjabi	Waheed Dar	
1990	Marshal	Punjabi	Younis Malik	
1990	Shadmani	Punjabi	Haji Mohammad Iqbal	
1990	Khatarnak	Punjabi	Akram Khan	
1990	Waliya	Punjabi	Mohammad Rasheed Dogar	
1990	Manga	Punjabi	Masood Butt	
1990	Qudrat Da Inteqam	Punjabi	Aslam Dar	
1990	Choran Di Rani	Punjabi	Daud Butt	
1990	Makhan Gujjar	Punjabi	Younis Malik	
1990	Paisa Naach Nachaway	Punjabi	Mohammad Rasheed Dogar	
1990	Sarmaya	Punjabi	Idress Khan	
1990	Jangi	Punjabi	Altaf Hussain	
1990	Jungbaz	Punjabi	Irshad Sajid	
1990	Sholay-E-Sholay	Punjabi	Raza Abidi	
1990	Siren	Punjabi	M. Aslam Malik	
1990	Sher Dil	Punjabi	Hasan Askri	
1991	Kalay Chor	Double version	Nazrul Islam	
1991	Bhangra	Punjabi	Imtiaz Qureshi	
1991	7 Khoon Muaf	Punjabi	Iqbal Kashmiri	
1991	Action	Punjabi	Kaifee	
1991	Sar Phira	Punjabi	M.J. Rana	
1991	Falak Sher	Punjabi	M. Aslam	
1991	Doulat Ke Pujari	Double version	Idress Khan	
1991	Super Power	Punjabi	Shoukat Raz	
1991	Jadoo Garni	Punjabi	Hasnain	
1991	Wehshi Dogar	Punjabi	Hasnain	
1991	Gandasa	Punjabi	Hasan Askri	
1991	Moula Te Mukho	Punjabi	Younis Malik	
1991	Ziddi Mera Naa	Punjabi	Mohammad Iqbal Bhatti	
1991	Lakhan	Punjabi	Masood Butt	
1991	Billu Badshah	Punjabi	Masood Butt	
1991	Charagh Bali	Punjabi	Masood Butt	
1991	Watan Kay Rakhwalay	Double version	Hassnain	
1991	Lahori Badmash	Punjabi	Shahid Rana	
1991	Badmash Thug	Double version	Zahoor Hussain Geelani	
1991	Cobra	Double version	Shahid Rana	
1991	Meri Jung	Punjabi	Mohammad Rasheed Dogar	
1991	Qanoon Apna Apna	Punjabi	M. Akram	
1991	Riaz Gujjar	Punjabi	Hassan Askari	
1991	Qatil Qaidi	Punjabi	Khalifa Saeed Ahmad	
1991	Behram	Punjabi	Mohammad Rasheed Dogar	
1991	Mastan Khan	Double version	Nasir Hussain	
1991	Gulfaam	Double version	Hasnain	
1991	Sher Afgan	Punjabi	Younis Malik	
1991	Lashkar	Punjabi	Waheed Dar	
1991	Shooka	Punjabi	Haidar	
1991	Medan-E-Jang	Punjabi	M. Sarwar	
1992	Khooni Sholay	Double version	Naseem Haidar	
1992	Bulanda	Punjabi	Zafar Shabab	
1992	Dil Lagi	Punjabi	Zahoor Hussain Geelani	
1992	Shera Pandi	Punjabi	Maqsood Ayaz	
1992	Chhakka	Punjabi	Imtiaz Qureshi	
1992	Qurbani	Punjabi	Khaliq Ahmad	
1992	Tarazoo	Punjabi	Faisal Ejaz	
1992	Agg Day Golay	Punjabi	Safdar Hussain	
1992	Abdullah The Great	Double version	Hassan Askari	
1992	Kakay Da Kharak	Punjabi	Shahid Rana	
1992	Zindgai	Double version	Zahoor Hussain Geelani	
1992	Haseeno Ki Barat	Double version	Iqbal Kashmiri	
1992	Mohammad Khan	Punjabi	Kaifee	
1992	Sher Jung	Double version	Younis Malik	
1992	Sanwal	Punjabi	Javed Hassan	
1992	Daku Raaj	Punjabi	Idrees Khan	
1992	Hijrat	Punjabi	Shahid Rana	
1992	Kharak	Punjabi	Safdar Hussain	
1992	Majhoo	Punjabi	Masood Butt	
1992	Baghai	Sindhi	Habib	
1992	Deputy	Punjabi	Anwar Malik	
1992	Pattan	Punjabi	Hassan Askari	
1992	Achha Shookar Wala	Punjabi	Hassan Askari	
1992	Supra	Punjabi	Faiz Malik	
1992	Parinday	Punjabi	Altaf Qamar	
1992	Ishq Zindabad	Double version	Masood Kashmiri	
1992	God Father	Double version	Pervaiz Rana	
1992	Babbra	Double version	Zahoor Hussain Geelani	
1992	Akhara	Double version	Altaf Qamar	
1992	Sher Ali	Punjabi	Masood Butt	
1993	Iradah	Double version	Hassan Askari	
1993	Ruqqa	Punjabi	Diljeet Mirza	
1993	Noori Bahadur	Punjabi	Safdar Hussain	
1993	Nadir Shah	Double version	Younis Malik	
1993	Katwal	Double version	Shahid Rana	
1993	Khuda Gawah	Double version	Masood Butt	
1993	Malakhro	Punjabi	Altaf Qamar	
1993	Subay Khan	Punjabi	Masood Butt	
1993	Paidagir	Double version	Zahoor Hussain Geelani	
1993	Guru Chela	Double version	Saeed Rana	
1993	Roshan Jutt	Punjabi	Mohammad Rasheed Dogar	
1993	Daku Chor Sipahi	Double version	Masood Butt	
1993	Soudagar	Double version	Zahoor Hussain Geelani	
1993	Faqeera	Punjabi	Mohammad Rasheed Dogar	
1993	Ghunda	Punjabi	Shahid Rana	
1993	Purana Papi	Punjabi	Akram Khan	
1993	Zabata	Double version	Jahangir Qaisar	
1993	Jagga Daku	Punjabi	Younis Malik	
1993	No Bobby No	Double version	Jalaluddin Khattak	
1993	Sar-E-Aam	Punjabi	Parvez Rana	
1993	Danday Da Dour	Punjabi	Idrees Khan	
1993	Zamana	Double version	Javed Fazil	
1993	Dunya Meri Jeib Mein	Double version	Zahoor Hussain Geelani	
1993	Toofan	Punjabi	Musbah Shami	
1993	Ibra	Punjabi	Daud Butt	
1993	Aan	Double version	Hassan Askari	
1993	Akri Shehzada	Punjabi	Mohammad Aslam Malik	
1994	Khan Bahadur	Double version	Masood Butt	
1994	Athra Gujjar	Punjabi	Iqbal Nimmi	
1994	Khandan	Double version	Masood Butt	
1994	Gujjar Badshah	Punjabi	Masood Butt	
1994	Gujjar Da Vair	Punjabi	Parvez Rana	
1994	Sher Punjab Da	Punjabi	Shahid Rana	
1994	Musa Khan	Double version	Saleem Qazi	
1994	Rani Beti Raj Karay Gi	Double version	Altaf Hussain	
1994	Zameen Aasman	Double version	Hasnain	
1994	Danda Pir	Punjabi	Zahoor Hussain Geelani	
1994	Machh Jail	Punjabi	Kaifee	
1994	Saranga	Punjabi	Masood Asghar	
1994	Pyasa Sawan	Double version	Javed Raza	
1994	Actor	Double version	Akram Khan	
1994	Pajero Group	Double version	Idrees Khan	
1994	International Luteray	Double version	Iqbal Kashmiri	
1994	Laat Saab	Double version	Altaf Hussain	
1994	Hathkari	Double version	Daud Butt	
1994	Gujjar Punjab Da	Punjabi	Parvez Rana	
1994	Jabroo Te Malangi	Punjabi	Shahid Rana	
1994	Ghunda Raj	Punjabi	Saeed Rana	
1994	Bala Peeray Da	Punjabi	Masood Butt	
1994	Nousarbaz	Double version	Zafar Sharif	
1994	Ziddi Gujjar	Punjabi	Younis Malik	
1994	Traffic Jam	Punjabi	Khalifa Saeed	
1995	Baghi Shehzaday	Double version	Saeed Rana	
1995	Shera Malang	Punjabi	Parvez Rana	
1995	Wehshi Aurat	Punjabi	Ali Raza	
1995	Att Khuda Da Vair	Punjabi	Parvez Rana	
1995	Mundra	Punjabi	Rashid Malik	
1995	Chhupay Rustam	Double version	Altaf Hussain	
1995	Dam Mast Qalandar	Double version	Zahoor Hussain Geelani	
1995	Madam Rani	Double version	Masood Butt	
1995	Gabbar Singh	Punjabi	Shahid Rana	
1995	Qalandra	Punjabi	Anjum Parvez	
1995	Mangal Khan	Punjabi	Mohammad Rasheed Dogar	
1995	Mastana Mahi	Punjabi	Agha Imtiaz Quresh	
1995	Khotay Sikkay	Double version	Altaf Hussain	
1995	Sanata	Double version	S.A. Khan	
1995	Chohdhary Badshah	Double version	Altaf Hussain	
1995	Sarak	Urdu	Iqbal Kashmiri	
1995	Golden Girl	Double version	Hasnain	
1995	Jungle Ka Qanoon	Double version	Masood Butt	
1995	Ishtehari Mujrim	Punjabi	M.A. Ghori	
1995	Sultan-E-Azam	Punjabi	Saeed Rana	
1995	Khoon Da Hisab	Punjabi	Imtiaz Qaisar	
1996	Akku 10 Numbri	Punjabi	Hasnain	
1996	Ghunda Gardi	Punjabi	Qurban Ali	
1996	Sakhi Badshah	Punjabi	Masood Butt	
1996	Choran Da Shehanshah	Punjabi	M.Ali Nasir	
1996	Zamana 420	Urdu	Qadir Hussain	
1996	Do Jeedar	Punjabi	Hassan Askari	
1996	Lakht-E-Jiggar	Urdu	Iqbal Kashmiri	
1996	Sab Se Bara Rupiya	Double version	Rahil Bari	
1996	Bazar Band Karo	Punjabi	Javed Hassan	
1996	Khel	Urdu	Nasir Raza Khan	
1996	Iqtadar	Punjabi	Arshad Kamal	
1996	Foja	Punjabi	Waheed Awan	
1996	Rani Khan	Punjabi	Azmat Nawaz	
† / Sultan Rahi Movies Shots The Completed This Language Change
1997	Kurri Munda Razi	Urdu	Javed Raza	
1997	Teefa Gujjar	Punjabi	Daud Butt	
1997	Dushman Da Kharak	Punjabi	Younis Malik	
1997	Kala Raaj	Punjabi	Faiz Malik	
1997	Lahoria	Punjabi	Iqbal Ansari	
1997	Takkar	Punjabi	M. Aslam	
1997	Sukhan	Punjabi	Deen	

== See also ==
- List of Pakistani actors
- Lists of Pakistani films
