= List of Pakistani films of 1983 =

A list of films produced in Pakistan in 1983 (see 1983 in film) and in the Urdu language:

== List of released films ==
Title	Director	Cast	Genre	Notes
Des Pardes	Iftikhar Khan	Sultan Rahi, Aasia, Chakori, Bahar	drama action musical film	
Wadda Khan	Diljeet Mirza		Action film	
Dara Baloch	Masud Butt	Sultan Rahi, Mustafa Qureshi, Anjuman, Ilyas Kashmiri	Action film musical film	
Sher Mama				
Moti Dogar		Mustafa Qureshi; Sultan Rahi; Mumtaz		
Dehleez				
Rustam Te Khan				

== See also ==
- 1983 in Pakistan
