= List of Pakistani films of 1994 =

List of Pakistani films by year 1994

A list of films produced in Pakistan in 1994 (see 1994 in film) and in the Urdu language:

== 1994 ==
| Title | Director | Cast | Genre | Notes |
|---|---|---|---|---|
1994
| International Luterey | Iqbal Kashmiri | Afzal Khan, Ghulam Mohiuddin, Nadeem, Sultan Rahi, Saima | Action | |
| Khandan | Masud Butt | Anjuman, Ghulam Mohiuddin, Nadeem, Sultan Rahi, Reema | Drama | |
| Pajero Group | | | | |
| Saranga | | | Action | |
| Sarkata Insaan | | | | |

== See also ==
- 1994 in Pakistan
