= Malanga (film) =

- Punjabi: ਮਲੰਗਾ
- Directed by: Rasheed Dogar; Mumtaz Hussain
- Written by: Nasir Adeeb
- Story by: Nasir Adeeb
- Produced by: Muhammad Hussain Dogar; Liaquat Ali
- Starring: Sultan Rahi; Anjuman; Mustafa Qureshi; Afzaal Ahmad; Nazli; Tanzeem Hassan; Shagufta; Zahir Shah; Nannha; Ilyas Kashmiri; Talish; Bahar; Habib
- Cinematography: Masood Butt
- Edited by: Qaisar Zamir
- Music by: Wajahat Attre
- Production company: Dogar Productions
- Distributed by: Dogar Films
- Release date: 21 November 1986 (Pakistan)
- Running time: 2:39:14
- Country: Pakistan
- Language: Punjabi

Malanga (Punjabi: ملنگا) is a 1986 Pakistani Punjabi-language action and musical film directed by Rasheed Dogar. It was produced by M. Hussain Dogar, starring Anjuman, Sultan Rahi, Mustafa Qureshi, Afzaal Ahmad and the duo (Tariq Shah - Ilyas Kashmiri).

== Synopsis ==
The protagonist, Sultan Rahi, receives money from several large investors and the movie follows the story of Jagirdar (Jaber Khan) extending his oppression.

== Cast ==
- Sultan Rahi - (Malanga)
- Anjuman
- Mustafa Qureshi - (Sher Khan)
- Afzaal Ahmad
- Nazli
- Tanzeem Hassan
- Shagufta - (Banoo)
- Zahir Shah
- Tariq Shah
- Altaf Khan
- Nasrullah Butt
- Seema Begum
- Nannha
- Ilyas Kashmiri - (Jabar Khan)
- Talish - (Deputy Superintendent Police)
- Bahar
- Habib - (Malanga)
- Haq Nawaz
- Ali Nasir
- Saleem Hassan
- Raseela - (Munshi)
- Sajjad Kishwar

== Music ==
The film score was composed by Wajahat Attre and film song lyrics were written by Waris Ludhianvi.

Malanga (1986 film) Album - Track listing
No.	Title	Lyrics	Music	Singer(s)	Length
1.	"Tere Mahi Diyan Mukian Judayan Ni.."	Waris Ludhianvi	Wajahat Attre	Noor Jehan & Mehnaz	5:00
2.	"Mere Gal Sone Da Tolna.."	Waris Ludhianvi	Wajahat Attre	Noor Jehan	5:08
3.	"Hai Ve Malangia, Malangni Kar Chhaddia Ae Matiar.."	Waris Ludhianvi	Wajahat Attre	Noor Jehan	5:17
4.	"Bariyan Ashiq Mizaj Akhhaan Terian, Wey Bado Badi Larri Jaandian.."	Waris Ludhianvi	Wajahat Attre	Noor Jehan	4:58
5.	"Main Te Wandan Gi.."	Waris Ludhianvi	Wajahat Attre	Noor Jehan	4:05
6.	"Gandh Bajj Gayi Mohabbatan Di.."	Waris Ludhianvi	Wajahat Attre	Noor Jehan	4:30
Total length:					19:34
