= Sher Punjab Da =

Sher Punjab da
- Directed by: Shahid Rana; Rehman Mugal; Zahid Butt
- Written by: Muhammad Kamal Pasha
- Produced by: Butt Goga; Humayun Butt; Naveed Butt
- Starring: Sultan Rahi; Saima; Gori; Naghma; Tanzeem Hassan; Abid Ali; Ilyas Kashmiri; Humayun Qureshi; Munawar Saeed; Tariq Shah; Bahar; Adeeb
- Narrated by: Haji Butt, Umar Usman
- Cinematography: Iqbal Nimmi, Maqsood Butt
- Edited by: K D. Mirza; Zamir Fazal
- Music by: Wajahat Attre; Khawaja Pervez (lyrics)
- Production companies: Jazi Films; Bari Studio; International Studio (Karachi).
- Release date: April 8, 1994 (Pakistan)
- Running time: 150 minutes
- Country: Pakistan
- Language: Punjabi

Sher Punjab Da (Punjabi: شیر پنجاب دا) is a 1994 Pakistani action film. directed by Shahid Rana and produced by Babar Butt Goga. Film starring actor Sultan Rahi, Gori, Saima and Ilyas Kashmiri.

== Cast ==
- Sultan Rahi – Shahiya Punjab
- Saima – (love interest of Sultan Rahi)
- Gori
- Abid Ali
- Tanzeem Hassan
- Bahar Begum
- Naghma – (mother of Shahiya)
- Humayun Qureshi
- Munawar Saeed
- Ilyas Kashmiri
- Tariq Shah
- Adeeb
- Saleem Hasan
- Khawar Abbas
- Hadiar Abbas

== Track list ==
The music of the film is composed by Wajahat Attre. The lyrics are written by Khawaja Pervez, Waris Ludhyanvi, and Yasin Hazin, and the singer is Noor Jehan.
