= Gernail Singh =

Pakistani film of 1987

- Directed by: Yunus Malik
- Written by: Nasir Adeeb; Jafar Arman
- Produced by: Fayyaz Khan
- Starring: Sultan Rahi; Anjuman; Mustafa Qureshi; Kaifee; Chakori; Habib; Nannha; Adeeb; Bahar; Anwar Khan; Durdana Rehman
- Cinematography: Kamran Mirza; Kamran Shah
- Edited by: Saleem Ahmad Rasheed; Mian Latif
- Music by: Wajahat Attre
- Release date: 27 February 1987
- Running time: 165 minutes
- Country: Pakistan
- Language: Punjabi

Gernail Singh (Punjabi: جرنیل سنگھ) is a 1987 Pakistani Punjabi-language film, directed by Yunus Malik and produced by Fayyaz Khan. It stars Sultan Rahi, Anjuman, Mustafa Qureshi, Kaifee, Ghulam Mohiuddin, and Chakori.

== Synopsis ==
Gernail Singh describes the conflicts among Hindus, Muslims and Sikhs in 1947 at the time of partition of British India. The film is based on a true story and events.

== Production and release ==
Gernail Singh was released by Evernew Studio with music by Wajahat Attre.

== Cast ==
- Sultan Rahi as Gernail Singh
- Anjuman as love interest of Gernail Singh
- Mustafa Qureshi as Chandi Wala
- Ghulam Mohiuddin as Ghulam Mohammad
- Kaifee as Husband of Banto
- Chakori as Banto
- Nannha
- Bahar as mother of Ghulam Mohammad
- Adeeb as Mr. Dahir
- Habib as Basheera
- Anwar Khan as Karnail Singh
- Durdana Rehman as Reeta
- Seema
- Zahir Shah
- Nasrullah Butt
- Altaf Khan – Mainje
- Saleem Hasan
- Khawar Abbas
- Haidar Abbas
- Hairat Angez
- Afzal Khan

== Track list ==
The music of the film is by Wajahat Attre. The film song lyrics are by Khawaja Pervez and singers are Noor Jehan and Naheed Akhtar.

#	Title	Singer(s)
1	"Aaj Dumroo Bolay Mera"	Noor Jahan, Naheed Akhtar
2	"Billo Naal Rahway Gi Tere"	Noor Jehan
3	"Sohni Kudi Jey Ik Vi Howe"	Noor Jehan, Nahid Akhtar
4	"Gallan Goorian Karangi Tere Nal Wey"	Noor Jahan
5	"Yaar Jadon Chori Chori Yaar"	Noor Jehan, Naheed Akhtar
6	"Tera Toran Ga Gharoor Main Zaroor"	Inayat Hussain Bhatti
