= Roti (1988 film) =

1988 film

- روٹی
- Directed by: M. Idrees Khan
- Written by: Nasir Adeeb
- Screenplay by: Nasir Adeeb
- Produced by: Abdul Waheed; M. Shafiq Butt
- Cinematography: Ghazanfar Ali
- Edited by: Khalid Burki
- Music by: Wajahat Attre
- Production companies: Butt Production; Evernew Studio (film production)
- Release date: 9 December 1988
- Running time: 160 (minutes)
- Country: Pakistan
- Language: Punjabi

Roti (transl. Chappati or Flatbread) is a 1988 Pakistani action film in Punjabi language.

It is directed by M. Idrees Khan and produced by Abdul Waheed, starring Sultan Rahi, Anjuman, Mustafa Qureshi, and Humayun Qureshi.

== Cast ==
- Anjuman love interest of Karma
- Sultan Rahi as Karma
- Saiqa as sister of Karma
- Talish
- Mustafa Qureshi as Javed Supera
- Zumurrud as Supera's lover
- Abid Ali
- Tanzeem Hassan
- Bahar
- Deeba as mother of Karma
- Albela
- Mansoor Baloch as Karamdad
- Humayun Qureshi as Bataa
- Tariq Shah as Hibbiat khan
- Sawan as Haq Baig
- Munir Zarif

== Track list ==
The soundtrack was composed by musician Wajahat Attre, with lyrics by Waris Ludhianvi and sung by Noor Jehan, and Mehnaz, Ghulam Abbas and Masood Rana.

#	Title	Singer(s)
1	"Ik Doojay Da Ban Kay Sahara Assin Rehna"	Mehnaz, Ghulam Abbas
2	"Jogi O Jogi, Munday bara Tang Karday.."	Noor Jahan
3	"Mann Mera Banda Tera.."	Noor Jehan
4	"Roop, Paisa Laatan Maray.."	Noor Jehan
5	"O Sheitana, Roti Deya Nana.."	Masood Rana
6	"Sonay Da Main Pa Kay.."	Noor Jehan
