= Maidan (1982 film) =

1982 film

Medan + Maidan میدان
- Directed by: Masud Butt
- Written by: Nasir Adeeb
- Based on: Sheran Day Puttar Sher
- Produced by: Jamshed Zafar
- Starring: Sudhir; Sultan Rahi; Mustafa Qureshi; Aasia; Chakori; Sawaan; Ilyas Kashmiri; Adeeb; Bahar; Naghma; Zahir Shah
- Narrated by: Ahmed Butt
- Cinematography: Umer Farooq
- Edited by: Zamir Qamir
- Music by: Tafoo
- Production company: Evernew Studio
- Distributed by: Dj Productions
- Release date: 2 April 1982
- Running time: 134 minutes
- Country: Pakistan
- Language: Punjabi

Maidan (Punjabi) is a 1982 Pakistani action film directed by Masud Butt and produced by Jamshed Zafar. Film starring actor Sudhir, Sultan Rahi, Mustafa Qureshi, Aasia, and Sawan.

== Cast ==
- Sudhir as Jagga
- Sultan Rahi as Nadir
- Mustafa Qureshi as Shikra
- Aasia
- Chakori
- Sawaan
- Ilyas Kashmiri
- Adeeb
- Bahar
- Naghma
- Zahir Shah
- Javed Hassan
- Iqbal Durrani
- Khawar Butt
- Veena
- Seema

== Soundtrack ==
The music of Maidan is composed by Tafoo with lyrics penned by Hazeen Qadri.

Maidan

Soundtrack album by Tafoo
- Released: 2 April 1982
- Recorded: 1982
- Genre: Film soundtrack
- Length: 19:05
- Language: Punjabi
- Label: EMI Musical
- Director: Sohail Nejji
- Producer: Jamshed Zafar
- Compiler: Khawaja Pervez

Tafoo chronology
| Wehshi Gujjar (1979) | Maidan (1982) | Pukar (1984) |

=== Track listing ===
| No. | Title | Artist(s) | Length |
|---|---|---|---|
| 1. | "Mein Ik Harni Junglei Way..." | Noor Jehan | 4:30 |
| 2. | "Goray Goray Hathan Nal Gadwi Wajani Aa..." | Noor Jehan | 4:07 |
| 3. | "Lak Hilay Majja Wali Da..." | Noor Jehan | 4:29 |
| 4. | "Bhabi Bol Bol Zara Bollian Khol..." | Noor Jehan | 3:59 |
