= Moti Sher =

1987 film

- Directed by: Imtiaz Qureshi
- Written by: Muhammad Kemal Pasha
- Produced by: Ashiq Hussain
- Starring: Sultan Rahi; Mumtaz; Afzaal Ahmad; Arifa Siddiqui; Shakila Qureshi; Tanzeem Hassan; Ilyas Kashmiri; Sheikh Iqbal; Sawan; Haidar Abbas; Bahar
- Cinematography: Iqbal Nimmi; Masud Butt
- Edited by: Mohammad Ashraf Bhatti
- Music by: Wajahat Attre
- Production companies: Channd Production; Bari Studio
- Release date: 20 February 1987
- Running time: 165 minutes
- Country: Pakistan
- Language: Punjabi

Moti Sher (Punjabi: موتی شیر) is a 1987 Pakistani Punjabi language action film, directed by Imtiaz Qureshi and produced by Ashiq Hussain. Film starring actor Sultan Rahi, Mumtaz, Afzaal Ahmed and Ilyas Kashmiri.

== Cast ==
- Moti- A horse's name featured in this film
- Sultan Rahi as Shera
- Mumtaz as Shera's love interest
- Afzaal Ahmed as Jageerdar's son
- Arifa Siddiqui as sister of Shera
- Shakila Qureshi as Sakina
- Tanzeem Hasan
- Bahar as mother of Shera
- Sawan
- Ilyas Kashmiri as Jageerdar
- Saleem Hasan as son of Jageerdar
- Khawar Butt
- Aachi Khan as son of Jageerdar
- Hadiar Abbas
- Iqbal Durrani
- Seema
- Firdousi
- Ali Khan – (a child actor)
- Munir Zarif – (comedy actor)

== Track list ==
The music of the film is by musician Wajahat Attre. The film song lyrics were penned by Waris Ludhianvi; the playback singers were Noor Jehan, Naheed Akhtar and Mehnaz.

#	Title	Singer(s)
1	"Nalay Lambi Te Nalay Gori"	Noor Jahan
2	"Toun Tukda Te Dil Mera"	Noor Jehan
3	"Rungi Gai Main Rungi Gai"	Noor Jehan
4	"Tooti Wuj Gayi Pyar Di"	Noor Jehan & Mehnaz
5	"Dharti Te Pub Maaran"	Naheed Akhtar
6	"Laathi Rab Di"	Noor Jehan & Mehnaz
