= Jagga Tay Shera =

1984 Pakistani film

Jagga Te Shera
- Directed by: Imtiaz Qureshi
- Written by: Muhammad Kamal Pasha
- Produced by: Ashiq Hussain; Amir Malik
- Starring: Sultan Rahi; Anjuman; Iqbal Hassan; Naghma; Albela; Sawan; Ilyas Kashmiri; Jaggi Malik; Nasrullah Butt; Altaf Khan; Changezi
- Cinematography: Riaz Butt
- Edited by: Zamir Qamar; Qasir Zamir
- Music by: Wajahat Attre; Khawaja Pervez (film song lyrics)
- Production companies: Chand Productions; Bari Studios
- Release date: 6 January 1984
- Running time: 170 minutes
- Country: Pakistan
- Language: Punjabi

Jagga Tay Shera (Punjabi: جگا تے شیرا) is a 1984 Pakistani Punjabi language film.

Directed by Imtiaz Qureshi and produced by Ashiq Hussain. Film starring actor Sultan Rahi, Anjuman, Iqbal Hassan and Ilyas Kashmiri.

== Cast ==
- Sultan Rahi - as Jagga
- Anjuman - (Love interest of Jagga)
- Iqbal Hassan - (Deputy) Sher Dil
- Naghma - Jagga's sister
- Jaggi Malik
- Nasrullah Butt
- Altaf Khan - Jageerdar's son
- Sawan - (Dara Daku)
- Ilyas Kashmiri - Jageerdar
- Changezi
- Anita
- Iqbal Durrani - Jageerdar's son
- Saleem Hasan - Jageerdar's son
- Khawar Abbas
- Hadiar Abbas
- Majeed Zarif
- Ladla
- Hairat Angez
- Munir Zarif - (comedy actor)
- Albela - (comedy actor)
- Jani - (comedy actor)

== Track listing ==
The music of the film is by Wajahat Attre. The film song lyrics are penned by Khawaja Pervez and the singers are Noor Jehan and Naheed Akhtar.

#	Title	Singer(s)
1	"Main Kamli Te Loki Siftaan Karde"	Noor Jahan
2	"Silky Lacha Main Paya"	Naheed Akhtar
3	"Lucky Kabootri Nu Par Lag Gaye"	Noor Jehan
4	"Rajyaan Na Akhyaan Deedar Karke"	Noor Jahan
5	"Do Nain Mere Do Nain Tere"	Noor Jehan
