= Khuddar =

Khuddar may refer to:

- Khuddar (1985 film), a Pakistani Punjabi-language film
- Khuddar (1994 film), an Indian Hindi-language film
