= Ranga Daku =

1978 Punjabi-language film by Arshad Mirza

- Directed by: Arshad Mirza and Rauf Abbasi
- Written by: Saeed Sahili
- Produced by: Ashiq Hussain, Amir Malik
- Starring: Sultan Rahi; Aasia; Afzaal Ahmad; Kiran; Samina; Saiqa; Ilyas Kashmiri; Sawan; Adeeb; Iqbal Durrani; Changezi
- Cinematography: Iqbal Nimmi
- Edited by: Zamir Qamar; Qasir Zamir
- Music by: Wajahat Attre
- Production companies: Chand Productions; Bari Studios
- Release date: 12 November 1978
- Running time: 160 minutes
- Country: Pakistan
- Language: Punjabi,

Ranga Daku (Punjabi: رنگا ڈاکو) is 1978 Pakistani Punjabi-language biographical film directed by Arshad Mirza.

This film is based on a true story from the Raj days in British India.

== Cast ==
- Sultan Rahi – Ranga Daku (title role)
- Aasia – (Love interest of Ranga)
- Afzaal Ahmad – (Karnal) Sher Singh
- Kiran – (Bhabi of Ranga)
- Samina Peerzada
- Saiqa – (sister of Ranga)
- Adeeb – (farangi)
- Irrum
- Meena Daud
- Ilyas Kashmiri – (Jageerdar)
- Nanha
- Ladla
- Hairat Angez
- Munir Zarif – (comedy actor)

== Tracklist ==
Film music was composed by the musician Wajahat Attre. The lyrics were written by Hazin Qadri and Khawaja Pervez, and sung by Noor Jehan and Naheed Akhtar.

No.	Title	Singer(s)	Length
1.	"Nikal Aayi Teri Lotteri Wey"	Naheed Akhtar
2.	"Ve Ajj Meri Veeni Phad Le"	Noor Jehan
3.	"Kin Min Layi Kaley Badra, Phij Gai Mein Aaja Sajana"	Noor Jehan
4.	"Pyar Tere Naal Mera"	Naheed Akhtar
5.	"Sadqey Mein Tere Sajna"	Naheed Akhtar
6.	"Kitna Accha Shab Hai Lovely Pyara"	Naheed Akhtar
