= Riaz Gujjar =

1991 film

Riaz Gujjar ریاض گُجر
- Directed by: Hasan Askari
- Written by: Muhammad Kamal Pasha
- Produced by: Muhammad Younis; Chodhary Muhammad Ilyas
- Starring: Sultan Rahi; Anjuman; Hina Shaheen; Mumtaz Malik; Humayun Qureshi; Anwar Khan; Tanzeem Hassan; Bahar; Tariq Shah; Afzaal Ahmad
- Narrated by: Waqar Bhai
- Cinematography: Irshad Ahmad
- Edited by: Sakawat; Asif Naeem; K D Mirza
- Music by: Wajahat Attre
- Production companies: Jamal Art; International Studio Karachi
- Release date: 6 September 1991
- Running time: 2:43:46
- Country: Pakistan
- Language: Punjabi

Riaz Gujjar (Punjabi: ریاض گُجر) is a 1991 Pakistani, (Punjabi-language action, musical film directed by Hassan Askari and produced by Muhammad Younis. The film stars Sultan Rahi, Anjuman, Hina Shaheen, and Afzaal Ahmad.

== Story ==
A Lahore city murder is the film's subject. Murder by Jafri and four others at Lakshmi Chowk, Lahore was the result of another old enmity that had claimed many lives in Lahore's criminal underground over the years.

== Cast ==
- Sultan Rahi as (Riaz Gujjar)
- Anjuman
- Hina Shaheen
- Humayun Qureshi
- Tariq Shah
- Afzaal Ahmad
- Bahar Begum
- Ladla
- Raseela

== Soundtrack ==
The music of Riaz Gujjar is composed by Wajahat Attre with lyrics penned by Khawaja Pervez.

Riaz Gujjar

Soundtrack album by Wajahat Attre
- Released: 1991
- Recorded: 1991
- Genre: Film soundtrack
- Length: 27:30
- Language: Punjabi
- Label: Digital Musical
- Director: Hassan Askari
- Producer: Muhammad Younis
- Compiler: Khawaja Pervez

Wajahat Attre chronology
Wehshi Gujjar (1979)	Riaz Gujjar (1991)	Ghunda Raj (1994)

=== Track listing ===
No.	Title	Artist(s)	Length
1.	"Aya Ni Aya Aya Aj Pyar Ban Ke"	Noor Jehan	5:00
2.	"Eh Ki Aye Eh Bulbul Aye"	Noor Jehan & Ghulam Abbas	5:07
3.	"Ishqe Da Phul Jadon"	Noor Jehan	5:59
4.	"Ve Akhiyan De Kol Reha Kar"	Noor Jehan	5:51
5.	"Main Khedi Aye Pyar Di Baazi"	Noor Jehan	5:35
