= Mela (1986 film) =

1986 film

- Directed by: Hassan Askari
- Written by: Nasir Adib
- Produced by: Anwar Kamal Pasha
- Starring: Sultan Rahi; Anjuman; Gori; Mustafa Qureshi; Saiqa; Ilyas Kashmiri
- Cinematography: Ali Jan
- Edited by: Haji Butt; Gami Butt
- Music by: Wajahat Attre
- Production companies: Nadia Production; Evrenew Studio
- Release date: 5 December 1986
- Running time: 170 minutes
- Country: Pakistan
- Language: Punjabi

Mela (Punjabi: میلہ) is a 1986 Pakistani Punjabi-language action film, directed by Hassan Askari and produced by Anwar Kamal Pasha, starring Sultan Rahi and Anjuman and in the lead roles.

== Cast ==
- Anjuman
- Sultan Rahi
- Gori
- Zamurrad
- Mustafa Qureshi
- Ilyas Kashmiri
- M. Ajmal
- Bahar
- Sawan
- Saiqa
- Nanha
- Anwar Khan
- Altaf Khan
- Zahir Shah

== Track list ==
#	Title	Singer(s)
1	"Aes Umray Pain Pulaikhay"	Noor Jahan
2	"Ae Silsila Tere Mere Pyar Da Hamaisha"	Noor Jehan
3	"Ni Sahailiyo Albelio"	Noor Jehan
4	"Thenga Ve Thenga"	Noor Jehan
5	"Ve Tauba Meri Ishqay Da Rog Bura"	Noor Jehan

All music is by Wajahat Attre and film song lyrics are by Ahmad Rahi, Khawaja Pervaiz and Waris Ludhianvi.
