= Charda Suraj =

1982 film

- Directed by: Basheer Rana; Daud Malik
- Screenplay by: Nasir Adib
- Story by: Nasir Adib
- Produced by: Mohammad Naeem Khan
- Starring: Sultan Rahi; Mumtaz; Iqbal Hassan; Aliya Begum; Mustafa Qureshi; Afzaal Ahmad; Abid Kashmiri; Rangeela; Ilyas Kashmiri; Asif Khan; Najma Mehboob; Bahar
- Cinematography: Masud Butt
- Edited by: Saleem Ahmad Rasheed; Zaki Munir
- Music by: Tafoo
- Distributed by: Khurram Saleem Productions
- Release date: 22 May 1982
- Running time: 170 mins
- Country: Pakistan
- Language: Punjabi

Charda Suraj (Punjabi: چڑھدا سورج) is a 1982 Punjabi-language Lollywood action film. It was directed by Basheer Rana and produced by Mohammad Naeem Khan, starring Sultan Rahi, Mumtaz, Mustafa Qureshi and Ilyas Kashmiri.

== Cast ==
- Sultan Rahi as Dilawar
- Mumtaz
- Iqbal Hassan
- Aliya Begum
- Mustafa Qureshi
- Najma Mehboob
- Iqbal Bukhari
- Ladla
- Afzaal Ahmad
- Rangeela
- Asif Khan
- Ilyas Kashmiri as Chaudhry Buland Bakht
- Abid Kashmiri
- Jaggi

== Music ==
The music of the film Charhda Suraj is by musician Tafoo. The lyrics are penned by Khawaja Pervez. The playback singers were:

- Noor Jehan
- Naheed Akhtar
- Inayat Hussain Bhatti
- Shaukat Ali

| # | Title | Singer(s) |
|---|---|---|
| 1 | "Kha Leya Mein Amb Sindhoori" | Noor Jehan |
| 2 | "Saddey Yaar Ne Bann Leye Sehrey" | Inayat Hussain Bhatti, Shaukat Ali |
| 3 | "Waj Gaye Ne Waj Gaye Ne" | Noor Jehan, Naheed Akhtar |
| 4 | "Kala Chitta Rang Baranga" | Noor Jehan |
| 5 | Bindi chamkey paseeney naal, Te pijh gaye kundlan waley waal | Noor Jehan |
