= Insaniyat Kay Dushman =

1990 film

Insaniyat Ke Dushman انسانیت کے دُشمن
- Directed by: Hasnain
- Written by: Nasir Adeeb
- Screenplay by: Nasir Adeeb
- Produced by: Tariq Butt
- Starring: Anjuman; Nadeem; Sultan Rahi; Izhar Qazi; Neeli; Afzaal Ahmad; Abid Ali; Kanwal; Humayun Qureshi; Masood Akhtar; Albela
- Narrated by: Hamaad Ayub
- Cinematography: Saleem Butt
- Edited by: Z. A. Zulfi
- Music by: M. Ashraf
- Production company: International Studio
- Distributed by: Rameez films
- Release date: 2 February 1990 (Pakistan)
- Running time: 158 minutes
- Country: Pakistan
- Languages: Urdu/Punjabi, Double version

Insaniyat kay Dushman (Urdu: انسانیت کے دُشمن) is a 1990 Pakistani action film, directed by Hasnain and produced by Tariq Butt. The film stars actors Anjuman, Nadeem, Neeli, Sultan Rahi and Afzaal Ahmad.

== Cast ==
- Anjuman - (Miss Rita)
- Nadeem - (Deputy Shehzad Khan)
- Neeli - (Bobby)
- Sultan Rahi - (D.I.G Basheer)
- Izhar Qazi - (Johnny)
- Kanwal - (Jameela)
- Albela
- Masood Akhtar - (Adjacent)
- Abid Ali - (Nawab Saab)
- Afzaal Ahmed - (Chief)
- Humayun Qureshi - (Alish)
- Munawar Saeed - (Shaka)
- Nasrrullah Butt - (King Kong)
- Baadal - (Cobra)

== Crew ==
- Writer - Nasir Adib
- Producer - Tariq Butt
- Production Company - Rameez films
- Cinematographer - Saleem Butt
- Music Director - M. Ashraf
- Lyricist - Saeed Gilani
- Playback Singers - Noor Jehan, A. Nayyar, Ghulam Abbas

== Music and film songs ==
- Gorey Badan Chon Masti ... Singer(s): Noor Jahan, A. Nayyar, Ghulam Abbas
- Tu Meri Jan Meray Jeeney Ka Sahara ... Singer(s): Ghulam Abbas

== Awards ==
This film won a total of 4 awards as listed below:

- Nigar Award for 'Best Film' of 1990
- Nigar Award for 'Best Director' of 1990
- Nigar Award for 'Best Scriptwriter' of 1990
- Nigar Award for 'Best Actress' of 1990
