= Waaday Ki Zanjeer =

Pakistani film

- واعدے کی زنجیر
- Directed by: Shabab Kiranvi
- Written by: Sattar Tahir
- Produced by: Shabab Kiranvi
- Starring: Muhammad Ali; Anjuman; Waheed Murad; Sabiha Khanum; Bindiya
- Music by: M. Ashraf
- Distributed by: Shabab Productions
- Release date: 2 February 1979
- Running time: 150 minutes
- Country: Pakistan
- Language: Urdu

Waaday Ki Zanjeer (Urdu: واعدے کی زنجیر, lit. 'Chain of Promise') is a 1979 Pakistani film directed by Shabab Kiranvi. It is written by Sattar Tair and produced by M. Ashraf. It stars Mohammad Ali, Anjuman, Waheed Murad, Sabiha Khanum and Bindiya in the lead roles.

== Plot ==
The story is about a widow Mariam (Sabiha) who lives with her two sons. Akbar (Muhammad) is a stepchild and Ashraf (Waheed) is her biological son. Mariam loves them both deeply and wishes only the best for both of them. She has a hard time taking care of her two sons since she doesn't have enough money. Later, she gives her biological son, Ashraf, to her boss, Anwar (Nanha), and his wife who doesn't have a child of their own. Later the two brothers meet as adults and they befriend a girl named Shabana (Anjuman).

== Cast ==
- Muhammad Ali as Akbar
- Anjuman as Shabana
- Waheed Murad as Ashraf
- Bindiya as Haseena
- Sabiha Khanum as Mariam
- Nanha as Anwar
- Shehla Gill as Heer
- Tamanna as Sassi
- Zille Subhan as Ashraf's father
- Ali Ejaz as Ranjha
- Masood Akhtar as Doctor Sahab
- Ghayyur Akhtar as Sartaaj
- Ibrahim Nafees as Rasheed
- Chakram as Dentist Doctor

== Production ==
Waaday Ki Zanjeer was filmed in Lahore and it was presented by Shabab Productions. Riaz ur Rehman Saghar wrote the script. Other crew members included Sadiq Moti.

== Music ==
All lyrics are written by Qateel Shifai and Masroor Anwar; all music is composed by M. Ashraf.

Waaday Ki Zanjeer
No.	Title	Singer (s)	Length
1.	"Main Aankh Ban Ke"	Naheed Akhtar	4:30
2.	"Tootay Jeevan Ka Har Sapna"	Mehnaz Begum	5:23
3.	"Ae Jan E Arzoo Tujhe Itna Karonga Pyar"	Mehdi Hassan	5:18
4.	"Tu Mera Ranjha Main Teri Heer"	Naheed Akhtar	5:18
5.	"Main Tujhe Chahon"	Naheed Akhtar	4:38
6.	"Ae Jan E Zindagi Tujhe Itna Karongi Pyar"	Naheed Akhtar	5:18
7.	"Phoolon Ko Mehkaar Mili"	Naheed Akhtar	4:35

== Reception ==
The film was released on 2 February 1979 and was a box office hit. It became a "Silver Jubilee".
