= Jeedar =

1981 film

- Jeedar
- Directed by: Kaifee
- Written by: Nasir Adeeb
- Screenplay by: Nasir Adib
- Produced by: Amina Fyaz
- Starring: Sultan Rahi; Mustafa Qureshi; Kaifee; Chakori; Anjuman; Nannha; Shakeel; Adeeb; Munir Zarif; Jaggi
- Narrated by: Fyaz Khan
- Cinematography: M. Lateef
- Edited by: Basarat
- Music by: Tafoo
- Distributed by: Rasheed films
- Release date: 9 October 1981 (Pakistan)
- Running time: 160 (minutes)
- Country: Pakistan
- Language: Punjabi

Jeedar (Punjabi: جی دار) is a 1981 Pakistani action film. It was directed by Kaifee and produced by Amina Fyaz. The film's main cast included Sultan Rahi, Anjuman, Mustafa Qureshi, and Adeeb.

== Film's Release ==
Jeedar was a film released on (Eid-ul-Azha ) 1401 hijri (on Friday, October 9, 1981).

== Cast ==
- Sultan Rahi
- Mustafa Qureshi
- Kifayat Hussain Bhatti (Kaifee)
- Chakori
- Anjuman
- Nannha
- Adeeb
- Jaggi Malik
- Munir Zarif

== Track list ==
The soundtrack was composed by the musician Tafoo, with lyrics by Khawaja Pervez and sung by Noor Jehan, Naheed Akhtar, Mehnaz and Inayat Hussain Bhatti.

#	Title	Singer(s)
1	"Kanday Wekh Ke Turye Ni Mutraye Ni"	Inayat Hussain Bhatti
2	"Balliya Oye Rona Paina"	Inayat Hussain Bhatti
