= Silsila (1987 film) =

1987 film

- Directed by: Aslam Dar; Murtaza Qureshi; Chaudhry Mohammad Arif
- Written by: Nasir Adeeb
- Produced by: Aslam Dar; Raheel Jabran Dar
- Starring: Sultan Rahi; Anjuman; Mustafa Qureshi; Durdana Rehman; Sitara; Babar; Talish; Albela; Bahar (Malik-E-Jazbat); Firdous Jamal; Arif Lohar
- Cinematography: Saeed Dar
- Edited by: Mian Tahir; Abdul Jabar
- Music by: Master Rafiq Ali
- Production companies: R.J. Productions; Dar Sanaz Movie Vision; Sanay Color Laboratory
- Release date: May 28, 1987
- Running time: 170 minutes
- Country: Pakistan
- Language: Punjabi

Silsila is a 1987 Pakistani Punjabi language musical, action film, directed by Aslam Dar and produced by Mian Farzand Ali. Indian actress Akshay Kumar's debut film Saugandh (1991) was copied from the film Silsila.

Then in the 90s, Arif Lohar's song from the film Anakh Jattan Di (1990) was copied from the Indian Punjabi actor Gugu Gill.

== Cast ==
- Sultan Rahi
- Anjuman
- Durdana Rehman
- Sitara
- Mustafa Qureshi - Sarang
- Babar
- Talish
- Firdous Jamal
- Nasrullah Butt
- Zahir Shah
- Albela
- Bahar - Malka Jazbat
- Nazia Hafeez
- Arif Lohar
- Altaf Khan
- Jaggi Malik

== Crew ==
- Writer - Nasir Adeeb
- Producer - Aslam Dar, R.J. Dar
- Production Company - R. J. Production
- Cinematographer - Saeed Dar
- Music Director - Master Rafiq Ali
- Lyricist - Hazin Qadri, Waris Ludhianvi, Hamid Dar
- Playback Singers - Noor Jehan, Humaira Channa, Arif Lohar

== Soundtrack ==
Song	Singers	Time	Notes
"Tere Mere Pyar Diyan Gallan"	Humera Channa	4:20	Popular song
"Piar Nadi Diyan Lehran"	Naheed Akhtar	3:36	Popular song
"Jatt Manzil Tey Aa Pohncheya"	Arif Lohar	6:30	Popular song
"Gutt Meri Kardi Aye Suh Suh"	Humera Channa	6:35	Popular song
