= Masood Akhtar (actor) =

Pakistani actor (1940–2022)

- مسعود اختر
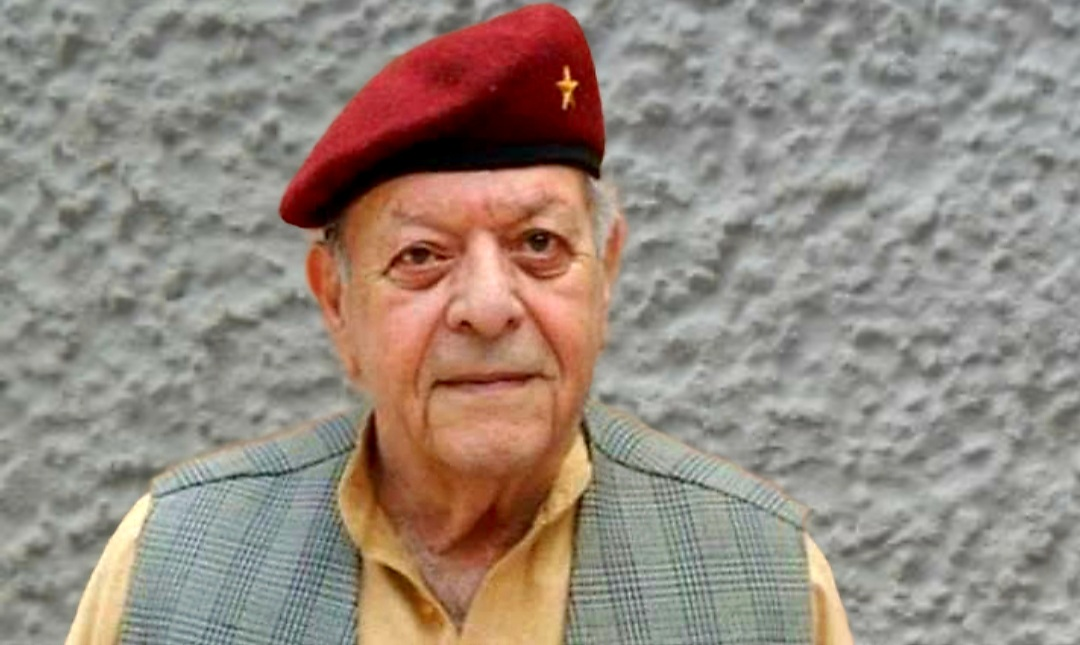
- Born: 5 September 1939; Sahiwal, Punjab
- Died: 5 March 2022 (aged 82); Lahore, Punjab, Pakistan
- Occupation: Actor
- Years active: 1956–2022
- Awards: Pride of Performance Award by the President of Pakistan in 2006

Masood Akhtar (Punjabi, Urdu: مسعود اختر; 5 September 1939 – 5 March 2022) was a Pakistani film and television actor who was considered one of the versatile actors of the industry.

== Early life and education ==
Masood Akhtar was born in Sahiwal on 6 September 1938/1939. After receiving his primary education from a local school, he entered Military College Murree. Later, he enrolled in MAO College Lahore. After graduation, he started working in a bank, while simultaneously pursuing a Bachelor of Laws degree.

== Acting career ==
Akhtar began his acting career in the 1956 with theatre and soon became a popular performer on stage. In 1968, director and producer Shabab Kiranwi introduced him to the film industry. He worked in around 135 movies — 78 Urdu, 51 Punjabi, three double versions and two Pashto. Akhtar is the pioneer of starting stage drama at Alhamra Arts Council. One of his early plays, Paisa Bolta Hai (transl. Money Talks), which was staged at Alhamra in the 1970s, earned him much popularity.

== Awards and recognition ==
- Pride of Performance Award for Akhtar was announced by the Government of Pakistan on 14 August 2005 and then the award was actually conferred on 23 March 2006.

== Death ==
Masood Akhtar died of lung cancer in Lahore on 5 March 2022, at the age of 82. He was battling lung cancer in the hospital for a couple of months before his death. He was buried at Gulshan-e-Ravi D Block Graveyard. Among the survivors were his widow and two daughters. His 51 years old son Ali Raza had died of a heart attack in September 2021.

== Selected filmography ==
- Sangdil (1968)
- Mera Naam Hai Mohabbat (1975)
- Shabana (1976)
- Waaday Ki Zanjeer (1979)
- Chotay Nawab (1980)
- Amanat (1981)
- Yeh Adam as nasir (1986)
- Insaniyat Kay Dushman (1990)
- Watan Kay Rakhwalay as Bara Mian (1991)
- Madam Rani (1995)
- Moosa Khan (2001)
