= Qaidi (1986 film) =

- Directed by: Masud Butt; Maqsood Bhatti
- Written by: Nasir Adib
- Produced by: Mian Farzand Ali
- Starring: Sultan Rahi; Anjuman; Mustafa Qureshi; Zamurrad; Afzaal Ahmad; Shugafta; Ilyas Kashmiri; Firdous; Nanha; Rangeela
- Cinematography: Masud Butt
- Edited by: Zamir Qamar
- Music by: Nazir Ali; Film song lyrics: Khawaja Pervez
- Production company: Arain Picuers
- Release date: 4 April 1986 (Pakistan)
- Running time: 170 minutes
- Country: Pakistan
- Language: Punjabi

Qaidi is a 1986 Pakistani Punjabi language action film and musical film. It was directed by Masood Butt and produced by Mian Farzand Ali.

== Cast ==
- Sultan Rahi
- Anjuman
- Afzaal Ahmad
- Zamurrad
- Mustafa Qureshi
- Shugafta
- Firdous Begum
- Nanha
- Ilyas Kashmiri
- Rangeela
- Altaf Khan
- Zahir Shah
- Jaggi Malik
- Asif Khan

== Crew ==
- Writer - Nasir Adeeb
- Producer - Mian Farzand Ali
- Production Company - Arain Pictures
- Cinematographer - Masud Butt
- Music Director - Nazir Ali
- Lyricist - Waris Ludhianvi
- Playback Singers - Noor Jehan

== Soundtrack ==
The music of the film is by musician Nazir Ali. The lyrics are penned by Khawaja Pervaiz and singers Noor Jehan and Nazir Ali.

Song	Singers	Time	Notes
"Suraj Wangon Chari Jawani"	Noor Jehan	5:28	Popular song
"Mahi Away Ga Mein Phullan Naal Dharti Sajawan Gi"	Noor Jehan	3:57	Popular song
"Disco Dhol Wajah"	Noor Jehan, Nazir Ali	4:46	Popular song
"Dilbar Ban Diljani Ban"	Noor Jehan	4:01	
"Pehli Pohri Ishq Di Main Charh Gai"	Noor Jehan	4:16	Popular song
"Nayi Sajde Pair Hun Jhanjhroo Bagair"	Noor Jehan	5:40	Popular song
