= Madam Rani =

1995 Pakistani film

Madam Rani میڈم رانی
- Directed by: Masood Butt
- Written by: Nasir Adib
- Story by: Nasir Adib
- Produced by: Haji Mohammad Aslam; Sheikh Mohammad Akram
- Starring: Anjuman; Nadeem; Sultan Rahi; Ghulam Mohiuddin; Reema; Afzal Khan; Nargis; Babar; Afshan Qureshi; Ilyas Kashmiri; Tariq Shah Humayun Quresh
- Narrated by: Haji Yasin Butt
- Cinematography: Masood Butt
- Edited by: Qasir Zamir
- Music by: Tafoo
- Production company: International Studio (Karachi)
- Distributed by: Al-Meraj Films
- Release date: 10 May 1995 (Pakistan)
- Running time: 157 minutes
- Country: Pakistan
- Language: Urdu Punjabi (Double version)

Madame Rani (Urdu میڈم رانی) is a 1995 Pakistani Punjabi language action film, Directed by Masood Butt and produced by Haji Mohammad Aslam, the film stars actors Nadeem, Anjuman, Sultan Rahi, Ghulam Mohiuddin, Reema Khan and Nargis.

== Cast ==
- Anjuman as (Madam Rani)
- Nadeem as Mr. Baig
- Sultan Rahi as Kali
- Ghulam Mohiuddin
- Reema
- Afzal Khan
- Nargis (Nargis won the Nigar Award for 'Best Suuporting Actress' in this film)
- Babar
- Tariq Shah
- Humayun Qureshi as Tadiwal
- Ilyas Kashmiri as Justice
- Majeed Zarif
- Afshan Qureshi
- Nasrullah Butt
- Masood Akhtar
- Saleem Hasan

== Music ==
The music of the film is by musician Tafoo. The lyrics are penned by Khawaja Pervez.

=== Track listing ===
No.	Title	Artist(s)	Length
1.	"Chira Chiri Se Ku Ku Karta"	Noor Jahan	5:23
2.	"Main Cheez Bari Hoon Mast Mast"	Noor Jehan	4:57
3.	"Kudi Takk Layi"	Noor Jehan & Farooq Shad	5:23
