= Dara Baloch =

1983 film

Dara Baloch (film)
- Directed by: Masud Butt
- Written by: Nasir Adeeb
- Screenplay by: Nasir Adeeb
- Produced by: Chaudhry Abbas Asghar
- Starring: Sultan Rahi; Anjuman; Iqbal Hassan; Zumurrud; Mustafa Qureshi; Sawan; Bahar; Adeeb; Ilyas Kashmiri; M. Ajmal; Habib (Guests); Naghma
- Cinematography: Masud Butt
- Edited by: Basarat Ali, Zamir Qaisar
- Music by: Wajahat Attre; Film song lyrics = Hazin Qadri; Singers; Noor Jehan, Naheed Akhtar
- Distributed by: Al Farid Production
- Release date: 2 December 1983 (Pakistan)
- Running time: 160 minutes
- Country: Pakistan
- Language: Punjabi

Dara Baloch (Punjabi: دارا بلوچ) is a 1983 Pakistani action film and a musical film directed by Masud Butt and produced by Abbas Asghar. The film stars Sultan Rahi, Iqbal Hassan, Mustafa Qureshi, and Ilyas Kashmiri.

== Cast ==
Acting	Roles
Sultan Rahi	Dara Baloch
Mustafa Qureshi	Inspector Haider
Anjuman	Tajji
Iqbal Hassan	Chan Badmash
Zummurud	Rajoo
Sawan	Khan Baloch
Bahar	Mother of Tajji
Ilyas Kashmiri	Baland Bakht
M. Ajmal	Kalo Jatt
Habib (Guest)	Thanaydar
Naghma (Guest)	Mother of Dara
Aliya (Guest actress)	Sister of Khan Baloch
Adeeb	Son of Baland Bakht
Zahir Shah	Son of Baland Bakht
Altaf Khan	Son of Baland Bakht
Iqbal Durrani	Son of Baland Bakht

== Track list ==
The music of film Dara Baloch (1983) is by famous musician Wajahat Attre. The lyrics are penned by Hazin Qadri, and the singers are :

- Noor Jehan
- Naheed Akhtar

#	Title	Singer(s)
1	Kithe Wasnan Aen Meria Dholia	Noor Jehan
2	Mar Gaee Nar Balocha	Noor Jehan
3	Akh Jadoon Chori Chori	Naheed Akhtar
4	Tomba Wajya Ishaq Wala Sohniya	Noor Jehan
5	Suraj Ban Gaye Bindiya Meri	Noor Jehan
