= Ghulami (1985 Punjabi film) =

1985 film

- Directed by: Hasnain
- Written by: Syed Noor
- Produced by: Sarwar Malik; Mian Arshad Butt
- Starring: Sultan Rahi; Mustafa Qureshi; Mohammad Ali; Yousuf Khan; Rani; Nazli; Saiqa; Nannha; Sawan; Zahir Shah; Adeeb; Afzaal Ahmed; Bahar
- Narrated by: Zahid Butt
- Cinematography: Imtiaz Qureshi
- Edited by: Z A Zulfi
- Music by: Wajahat Attre
- Production companies: Al Mehram Production; Evernew Studio
- Distributed by: Al Mehram Films
- Release date: 25 October 1985 (Pakistan)
- Running time: 175 min
- Country: Pakistan
- Language: Punjabi

Ghulami (Punjabi: غلامی) is a 1985 Pakistani Punjabi-language film.

== Cast ==
- Sultan Rahi – (Haider)
- Mustafa Qureshi – (Makhan Singh)
- Mohammad Ali – (John)
- Yousuf Khan – (Akbar)
- Rani – (Rani)
- Nazli – (Bantoo)
- Saiqa – (Banoo)
- Nannha – (Maan Singh)
- Zummarrad – (Dancer)
- Sawan – (Dara Daku)
- Zahir Shah – (Mangal Singh)
- Adeeb – (Jagat Singh)
- Afzaal Ahmed – (Farangi)
- Bahar – (Sabra)
- Tanzeem Hassan – (Sona Singh)
- Jaggi Malik – (Chann Singh)
- Nasrullah Butt – (Charan Singh)
- Jahangir Mughal
- Mustafa Tind
- Sikedar
- Hairat Angez

== Songs (album) ==
For all the film's songs, the music composer was Wajahat Attre and the film song lyrics were by Khawaja Pervez.

- Noor Jehan

Ghulami (Pakistani film) Album – Track listing
No.	Title	Lyrics	Music	Singer(s)	Length
1.	"Do Billiaan Akhiyan Maar Gaiyyan.."	Khawaja Pervez	Wajahat Attre	Noor Jehan	4:29
2.	"Pyaar To Lakh Wait Tuba Tuba.."	Khawaja Pervez	Wajahat Attre	Noor Jehan	5:29
3.	"Tera Mera Das Ki Rishta.."	Khawaja Pervez	Wajahat Attre	Noor Jehan	4:47
4.	"Jis Din Teri Yaad Bhulawan.."	Khawaja Pervez	Wajahat Attre	Noor Jehan	4:55
5.	"Merey Nasiban Wich Pyar Hai Kay Nahin.."	Khawaja Pervez	Wajahat Attre	Noor Jehan	4:10
Total length:					29:13
