= General Bakht Khan =

1979 film

General Bakht Khān جنرل بخت خان بڑیچ
- Directed by: Sarshar Akhtar Malik
- Written by: Sarshar Akhtar Malik
- Produced by: Nosheen Malik; Sarshar Akhtar Malik
- Starring: Neelo; Mohammad Ali; Sultan Rahi; Badar Munir; Sudhir; Yousuf Khan; Ilyas Kashmiri; Adeeb; Nasrullah Butt; Irfan Khoosat; Changezi
- Narrated by: Sadiya Bano
- Cinematography: Muhammad Iqbal Choudhry
- Edited by: Ahmad Akram Kardar
- Music by: Akhtar Hussain Akhian
- Production company: Bari Studios
- Release date: 12 October 1979 (Pakistan)
- Running time: 150 minutes
- Country: Pakistan
- Language: Urdu

General Bakht Khan (Urdu: جنرل بخت خان) is a 1979 Pakistani film about the Indian Rebellion of 1857, directed by Sarshar Akhtar Malik and produced by Nosheen Malik. Film starring actor Mohammad Ali, Yousuf Khan, Sultan Rahi and Sudhir.

== Cast ==
- Sultan Rahi – General Bakht Khan
- Neelo – (Love interest of General Bakht Khan)
- Mohammad Ali – Haji Baba
- Badar Munir – Jamil Baig
- Sudhir – (Commander) Zubair
- Yousuf Khan – (Mujahid-e-Awwal) Farooq Khan
- Adeeb – (General) Sheel
- Badar Munir – (father of Bakht) Abdullah Khan
- Ilyas Kashmiri – Baba
- Changezi – (General) Mauoos
- Nasrullah Butt – (General) Ladkand
- Badal
- Abu Shah

== Soundtrack ==
The music of the film is by musician Akhtar Hussain Akhian. The lyrics are penned by Khawaja Pervez and singer is Mehdi Hassan.

- Yaad Kar Karbala Ka Woh Zamana sung by Mehdi Hassan
