= Khuddar (1985 film) =

1985 Pakistani Punjabi-language film

- Directed by: M. Akram
- Written by: Syed Noor
- Produced by: M. Akram; Ch Zaheer Ahmed; M. Pervaiz
- Starring: Sultan Rahi; Anjuman; Mustafa Qureshi; Iqbal Hassan; Khanum; Zumurrud; Aslam Pervaiz; Bahar; Naghma; Talish; Zubair
- Cinematography: Babar Bilal
- Edited by: Mushtaq Mirza
- Music by: Wajahat Attre; Film song lyrics=Khawaja Pervez
- Production company: Evernew Studios
- Release date: 4 October 1985
- Running time: 170 minutes
- Country: Pakistan
- Language: Punjabi

Khuddar (Punjabi: خود دار) is a 1985 "Family Drama" Pakistani Punjabi-language film.

Directed and produced by M. Akram. Film starring actor Sultan Rahi in the lead role and with Anjuman and Mustafa Qureshi and Talish as the Grandfather.

== Cast ==
- Sultan Rahi
- Anjuman
- Mustafa Qureshi
- Iqbal Hassan – Jan Khan
- Zumurrud
- Naghma – Sabra Iman
- Bahar Begum
- Khanum – Jan khan (Sister)
- Zubair
- Aslam Pervaiz
- Talish – Khan Shan
- Nasrullah Butt
- Ladla
- Changezi
- Munir Zarif
- Haq Nawaz

== Music ==
Music was composed by Wajahat Attre and film song lyrics were written by Khawaja Pervez.

#	Title	Singer(s)
1	"Ni Kaahda Ee Gharoor Balliyay"	Masood Rana, Noor Jahan- a bhanghra song
2	"Dar Dunya Da Hunda Sohnia, Asseen Pyaar Na Paonday"	Noor Jahan
3	"Haai Ni Lachhye Touba Ni"	Noor Jehan
4	"Dar Dunya Da Hunda Sohnia, Asseen Pyaar Na Paonday"	Noor Jahan
5	"Pyar Di Mehndi Goray Goray Hathhan Tay Saja Laii"	Noor Jehan
