= Chan Varyam =

1981 Pakistani film

- چن ور یأم
- Directed by: Jahangir Qaisar
- Written by: Nasir Adeeb
- Screenplay by: Irshad Bhatti
- Story by: M. Sarwar Bhatti
- Produced by: M. Sarwar Bhatti
- Starring: Sultan Rahi; Anjuman; Iqbal Hassan; Shugafta; Afzaal Ahmed; Mustafa Qureshi; Humayun Qureshi; Ilyas Kashmiri; Sawan; Ajmal Khan; Mehboob Alam
- Narrated by: Mohammad Jamil
- Cinematography: Masood-ur-Rehman
- Edited by: Haji Mohiuddin
- Music by: Wajahat Attre
- Production companies: Bahu Films Pvt Ltd; Evernew Studio (film production)
- Distributed by: Bahu Films Pvt Ltd
- Release date: 2 August 1981 (Pakistan)
- Running time: 170 minutes
- Country: Pakistan
- Language: Punjabi

Chan Varyam (Punjabi: چن ور یأم) is a 1981 Punjabi-language Pakistani action film. Directed by Jahangir Qaisar and produced by Mohammad Sarwar Bhatti, the film stars Sultan Rahi, Anjuman, Iqbal Hassan, Mustafa Qureshi, Afzaal Ahmed, Humayun Qureshi and Mehboob Alam.

== Release ==
Chann Varyam was the third big film released on Eid-day, August 2, 1981.

== Cast ==
- Sultan Rahi
- Anjuman
- Iqbal Hassan
- Mustafa Qureshi
- Shugafta
- Afzaal Ahmed
- Humayun Qureshi
- Nasrullah Butt
- Altaf Khan
- Zahir Shah
- Sawan
- Gul Zaman
- Sikkedar
- Ajmal

== Guest appearances by actors ==
- Ilyas Kashmiri
- Hanif
- Mehboob Alam

== Awards ==
Won a Nigar Award in 1981 for Best Script.

== Track list ==
The soundtrack was composed by the musician Wajahat Attre, with lyrics by Hazin Qadri and sung by Noor Jehan and Mehnaz.

#	Title	Singer(s)
1	"Saif Ul Malook 1- Awwal Hamd Sana-e-Ilahi"	Shaukat Ali
2	"Sun Sun Sun Pahbi Dhol Piya Wajda"	Noor Jehan, Mehnaz
3	"Saif Ul Malook 2"	Shaukat Ali
4	"Ek Paasay Pain Te Doojay"	Noor Jehan
5	"Wey Soney Deya Kangna, Tey Sauda Ikko Jaya"	Noor Jehan
6	"Main Ek Dharti Sud Di Bul Di"	Noor Jehan
7	"Rumli Ve Rumli Puchh Di Ae Kamli"	Noor Jehan
