= Sarmaya =

1990 film

- Directed by: Idrees Khan
- Written by: Nasir Adeeb
- Starring: Sultan Rahi; Anjuman; Jawed Sheikh; Mehmood Aslam; Rashid Mehmood
- Cinematography: Ghazanfar Ali
- Music by: Chikku Lehri
- Production company: Tafu Brothers
- Distributed by: Rashid Films
- Release date: June 12, 1990 (Pakistan)
- Running time: 157 minutes
- Country: Pakistan
- Language: Punjabi

Sarmaya (Punjabi: سرمایہ) is a 1990 Pakistani Punjabi-language action film. Directed by Idrees Khan and written by Nasir Adeeb, the film stars Sultan Rahi, Jawed Sheikh, Neeli and Humayun Qureshi.

== Cast ==
- Sultan Rahi as Zulfi Pelwan
- Anjuman as Sehiylaa
- Jawed Sheikh as Superintendent of Police
- Shakeela as Jawed's lover
- Sonia as Zebo
- Waseem Abbas as Monna
- Albela
- Tanzeem Hassan as Ibrahim
- Babar as Dolur
- Mehmood Aslam as Oot
- Rashid Mehmood as Sonna
- Bahar as Haleema
- Nida Mumtaz as Sastaa
- Deeba as mother of Sastta
- Rangeela
- Mansoor Baloch as Sudhan
- Humayun Qureshi as Gurdev
- Asif Khan
- Adeeb Thaikaydar

== Track list ==
The film's music was composed by the musician Chikku Lehri, with the song lyrics penned by Khawaja Pervez and Waris Ludhianvi and sung by Noor Jehan.

Title	Singer(s)
"Guddi Raat Nu Auddiy Aay"	Noor Jehan
"Vey Pinday Taun Razai Lath Gai"	Noor Jehan
"Moti Bolia Da Akhiyan Nu Cherda"	Noor Jehan
"Akar Bakar Bambay Bo"	Noor Jehan
