= Behram Daku =

1980 Pakistani film

- Directed by: Rauf Abbasi
- Written by: Saeed Sahili
- Produced by: Khawaja Feroz Din
- Starring: Sultan Rahi; Aasia; Chakori; Adeeb; Talish; Allauddin; Sawan; Ajmal Khan; Ilyas Kashmiri; Rehan
- Cinematography: Ashiq Mirza
- Edited by: Zameer Qamar
- Music by: Saleem Iqbal
- Production companies: Zaibyko Pictures; Bari Studios
- Release date: 13 August 1980
- Running time: 180 minutes
- Country: Pakistan
- Language: Punjabi

Behram Daku (Punjabi: بہرام ڈاکو) is a 1980 Pakistani Punjabi-language action film, directed by Rauf Abbasi and produced by Khawaja Feroz Din. The film stars Sultan Rahi in the lead role, with Aasia and Allauddin, Talish.

== Cast ==
- Sultan Rahi – Behram Daku
- Aasia – Taji
- Chakori – Nohu Pati
- Adeeb – Habith Khan
- Talish – Karnal Laras
- Allauddin – Maulvi Saab
- Sawan – Jagat Nath
- M. Ajmal – Father of Behram Daku
- Khayyam – Veena Nath
- Nasrullah Butt – Jagat Nath's son
- Jagi Malik – Dullah Bamb Daciket
- Changezi
- Khalid Saleem Mota – Akbra
- Ilyas Kashmiri – Sher Singh
- Rehan – Officer
- Anwar Majeed – Ram Lal
- Nimmo
- Taya Barkat – Fazlu Chacha
- Aboo Shah
- Nanha
- Ibrar
- Saleem Hassan
- Sahil Siddiqi
- Haider Abbas
- Zaman

== Track list ==
Film music is by Salim Iqbal and film song lyrics by Waris Ludhianvi and Sahil Siddiqi

#	Title	Singer(s)
1	"Aj Mera Mahi Sher Wangun Gajjia"	Noor Jahan
2	"Aj Mere Chan Mahi Nath Sahnun Paaii Aey"	Noor Jehan
3	"Mere Seene Wich Quran"	Noor Jehan
4	"Jind Azlan Toun Lai Tere Naam"	Noor Jehan
5	"Kahnon Marni Aein"	Noor Jehan
6	"Nabi De Ghulam Asseen"	Shaukat Ali
