= Saranga (1994 film) =

1994 film

- Directed by: Mohammad Masood Asghar; Ali Akbar
- Written by: Saleem Murad
- Screenplay by: Saleem Murad
- Story by: Saleem Murad
- Produced by: Rai Mohammad Yousuf
- Starring: Sultan Rahi; Gori; Saima; Ghulam Mohayuddin; Sabiha Khanum; Badar Munir; Humayun Qureshi; Tariq Shah; Ilyas Kashmiri
- Narrated by: Sheikh Abdul Qayyum; Chaudhary Waseem
- Cinematography: Nabi Ahmad
- Edited by: Asghar
- Music by: Zulfiqar Ali; Film song lyrics by Saeed Gillani
- Distributed by: Fanoos Pictures
- Release date: 3 June 1994
- Running time: 150 minutes
- Country: Pakistan
- Language: Punjabi

Saranga (Punjabi: سارنگا) is a 1994 Pakistani Action film, directed by Mohammad Aslam Murad and produced by Rai Mohammad Yousuf.

== Cast ==
- Saima as Sakina
- Sultan Rahi as Saranga
- Ghulam Mohayuddin as Deputy Inspector Police Mansoor
- Gori as Shukhaan
- Sabiha Khanum as Chiragh Khan's wife
- Badar Munir as Subaydar Qamar Khan
- Tanzeem Hassan as Maloo
- Humayun Qureshi as Siyana
- Zahir Shah as Majoo
- Tariq Shah as Jalad Khan
- Ilyas Kashmiri as Khan Baba
- Ladla
- Saleem Hassan
- Nasrullah Butt as Chiragh Khan (Guest appearance)
- Altaf Khan as Inspector Police (Guest appearance)

== Track list ==
The music of the film was composed by Zulfiqar Ali. Song lyrics were penned by Saeed Gillani, and the singers were Noor Jehan and Masood Rana.

#	Title	Singer(s)
1	"Shukhaan Mera Naa"	Noor Jehan
2	"Challa Dil Da Gehna"	Noor Jehan, Sultan Rahi
3	"Jadaun Paindi Ay Sajna Raat"	Noor Jehan
4	"Tip Tip Kothay Uttay Saun Da Mahina"	Noor Jehan
5	"Uth Majhe Dya Sher Jawana"	Masood Rana
