= Rustam Te Khan =

1983 film

- Punjabi: رستم تے خان
- Directed by: Altaf Hussain
- Written by: Nasir Adeeb
- Screenplay by: Sikandar Saleem Khan
- Based on: Wadda Khan by Yousuf Khan
- Produced by: Chaudhry Mohammad Ismail
- Starring: Yousuf Khan; Sultan Rahi; Anjuman; Mustafa Qureshi; Nargis; Zumurrud; Bahar; Habib; Ilyas Kashmiri; Albela; Talish
- Cinematography: Parvez Khan
- Edited by: Iqbal Ali; Sufi
- Music by: M Ashraf
- Production companies: Ismail Productions; Movie Vision Studio
- Distributed by: Ismail Productions
- Release date: 25 November 1983
- Running time: 165 minutes
- Country: Pakistan
- Language: Punjabi

Rustam Te Khan (Punjabi: رستم تے خان) is a 1983 Pakistani action film, directed by Altaf Hussain, produced by Chaudhry Mohammad Ismail. The film stars Yousuf Khan, Sultan Rahi, Anjuman and Mustafa Qureshi.

== Cast ==
- Yousuf Khan
- Sultan Rahi
- Anjuman
- Zumurrud
- Mustafa Qureshi
- Nazli
- Nargis
- Bahar
- Ilyas Kashmiri
- Zahir Shah
- Azhar Khan
- Altaf Khan
- Nasrullah Butt
- Saleem Hasan
- Abid Kashmiri
- Munir Zarif
- Albela
- Haidar Abbas
- Gulzar

=== Guest appearances by ===
- Habib
- Talish

== Film's track list ==
The music of film Rustam Tey Khan (1983) is by musician M Ashraf. The lyrics are penned by Khawaja Pervez and the singer is Noor Jehan.

#	Title	Singer(s)
1	"Chaudhry Jee, Dil Dena Jey Ke Nahin"	Noor Jehan
2	"Peeng Da Hulara"	Noor Jahan
3	"Le Chal Door Uda Ke"	Noor Jehan
4	"Jinhan Sohna Khan Mera"	Noor Jehan
5	"Lekhan Ne Pawaaey Ghunghroo"	Noor Jehan
