= Puna, Gujarat =

Puna
- Suburb
- Location in Gujarat, India Puna (India)
- Coordinates: 21.03°N 72.89°E
- Country: India
- State: Gujarat
- District: Surat
- Talukas: Choryasi

Government
  - Body: SUDA

Area
  - Total: 19 km^{2} (7.3 sq mi)
- Elevation: 13 m (43 ft)

Population (2001)
  - Total: 119,092
  - Density: 6,300/km^{2} (16,000/sq mi)

Languages
  - Official: Gujarati, Hindi
- Time zone: UTC+5:30 (IST)
- Telephone code: 0261
- Vehicle registration: GJ-5
- Sex ratio: 664/1000 males ♂/♀
- Civic agency: SUDA
- Website: gujaratindia.com

Puna is a suburb of Surat in the Indian state of Gujarat. The city is located 9 km east of Surat on the Surat-Bardoli highway NH6. Puna comes under the Surat Metropolitan Region.

== Geography ==
The city is located at 21.08°N 72.88°E. It has an average elevation of 16 metres (66 feet).

== Demographics ==
As of 2001 India census, Puna has a population of 98,523. Males constitute 51% of the population and females 49%. Puna has an average literacy rate of 74%, higher than the national average of 59.5%: male literacy is 81%, and female literacy is 63%. In Puna, 14% of the population is under 6 years of age.

== Transport ==
By road: Puna is 6 km from Udhana and 9 km from Surat.

By air: the nearest airport is Surat, which is 25 km from Puna.

== See also ==
- List of tourist attractions in Surat
