= Anjuman (actress) =

Pakistani film actress

- انجُمَن
- Born: Anjuman Shaheen; 23 December 1955 (age 70); Bahawalpur, Punjab, Pakistan
- Occupations: Film actress; Singer
- Years active: 1973–present
- Spouse: Mobin Malik
- Children: 3
- Relatives: Gori (sister)
- Honours: Pride of Performance Award by the President of Pakistan (2023)

Anjuman Shaheen (Urdu: انجمن شاہین) is a Pakistani film actress and singer. She was one of the most successful Punjabi film heroines of Pakistan during the 1970s, 1980s, and 1990s.

== Early life ==
She was born in Bahawalpur. Anjuman's parents were from Ahmadpur East, and settled in Multan, where Anjuman was brought up. She later moved to Lahore. Anjuman's younger sister Gori is also a former actress.

== Career ==
Her career spanned almost 20 years, and she appeared in more than 300 films. She first appeared in the Urdu film, Soorath (1973), co-starring with Waseem Abbas, Afshan, and Taj Niazi. Her last appearance was in Peengan (2000). Soorath was not a success. Her first major hit was Waaday Ki Zanjeer (1979). She had major roles in Sher Khan and Chan Varyam (both 1981) and played a supporting role in the film Sala Sahib (1981). All three were diamond jubilee hit films and were released the same day, a unique record, which she shared with her co-star Sultan Rahi, her playback voice Noor Jehan, and musician Wajahat Attre.

She appeared with every hero of her era, but her pairing with Sultan Rahi ruled the Punjabi cinema for more than a decade. She also appeared with Waheed Murad, Ali Ejaz, Javed Sheikh, Ghulam Mohiuddin, Izhar Qazi, and Nadeem. Her initial films were in Urdu, but the bulk of her career was based on acting in Punjabi films. Her roles ranged from a traditional innocent village girl to a modern sexy bombshell, in romantic to action-packed films. Anjuman was a darling of the working classes. She had the figure of a traditional Punjabi Mutyaar much admired in Punjab, Pakistan. Her fans also admired her dancing, especially her thumkas (a dance form that consists of pelvic thrusting).

In the 1980s, after the box-office success of Chan Varyam (1981), Sultan Rahi, Mustafa Qureshi, Anjuman, and the playback singing of Noor Jehan dominated the Punjabi film industry to such an extent that a film was not considered a viable project unless they were present in it. Film after film was launched with all four stars, with different names, but merely repeating their roles from the previous efforts. Nonetheless, the public lapped it up and all of them became icons of an era.

== Anjuman as an action heroine ==
In Punjabi films, Sultan Rahi gained reputation as an action hero, but in many films, Anjuman herself played an action heroine where she would fight with the villains. Some of her action films are Mela (1986), Hunter Wali (1988), Dulari (1987), Qatil Haseena (1989), Daku Haseena, Kali Charan, Sultana, Nangi Talwar, etc.

She was seen in action films, riding horses, driving motorbikes, and doing stunts, which gave a new dimension to female roles in Lollywood movies, which previously only promoted the image of a shy and innocent girl. The plots of Anjuman's action films were mainly revenge based. She played a don in Insaniyat ke dushman. Anjuman can be considered the first established action heroine of the Pakistan film industry. Her viewers not only liked her acting and dances but also her action skills. In 2023, Anjuman was awarded with Pride of Performance to honour her accomplishments and performances.

== Singing ==
Anjuman was also a keen singer. The only song she performed publicly as a singer happened to be Tere Bajre Di Rakhi, a traditional Punjabi song that she performed for PTV.

== Marriage ==
Anjuman married income tax commissioner, Mobin Malik, gave birth to two sons and one daughter. Zeeshan, Adnan, and Iman, quit films, and lived in the United Kingdom with her family. However, Mobin Malik, Anjuman's husband, was assassinated on Eid day, 16 October 2013, while he was in Lahore visiting relatives.

Anjuman got married for the second time in 2019 with business tycoon Mian Waseem, AKA Lucky Ali. The ceremony was attended by only close family and friends.

== Comeback in films ==
Anjuman returned to acting in 1999 in the title role in the film Chaudrani (1999 film). The adoring masses welcomed their beloved 'Queen' home and lifted Chaudhrani to a considerable success upon its release, but soon the golden touch began to fade. Anjuman, however, perceived Chaudhrani's success as vindication of everything she had planned. She refused any further character roles, opting only for solo heroine projects and required a lofty salary of Rs. 300,000. She felt that she was in a position to be calling all the shots, but in any film industry, you are only as good as your last hit, and she was soon to taste the price of stardom. Her next release was Jag Mahi, opposite Ghulam Mohiuddin, in 2000, met with a tee response . Anjuman's next release was a litmus test of sorts. The film Peengan (2000) opposite Saud was met with derision due to the age gap between her and the film's hero.

She was abruptly dropped from the film Badmaash, for which she had already canned two songs and numerous scenes, and replaced by upcoming starlet Noor. The film producer felt they would be better off cutting Anjuman, and their costs, rather than going ahead with Anjuman as the leading lady.However, her song with Sana was kept in the movie, which was a huge hit. Damak Damak song received accolades from the viewers, and money was showered in Prince Cinema Lahore during screening of this song. Film Badmash proved out to be a superhit, and main credit goes to Anjuman's song.

Further news arrived that Anjuman's scenes in the film Badmaash Tey Qanoon had also been dropped and edited out of the film, and that she had been replaced by Nargis. This was the final straw for Anjuman, the humiliation proving too much to take. She announced her immediate retirement, that she was just hanging around to complete her on hand assignments, and that she would shortly be leaving Pakistan altogether for a life of anonymity in the UK, where her former husband Mobin Malik owned a flat in Knightsbridge, London. Her final two movies were Jatti da vair in 2000 and Ik dhee punjab di (Daughter of Punjab).

== Filmography ==
Year	Film	Role	Co-stars
1973	Soorath		Waseem Abbas, Afshan, Taj Niazi
1977	Dameena Dameena		Yasmin Khan, Badar Munir, Asif Khan, Anjuman, Naemat Sarhadi
1979	Waaday Ki Zanjeer		Waheed Murad, Mohammad Ali, Sabiha, Ali Ejaz, Nannah
1979	Do Rastay		Mumtaz, Nadeem, Shahid, Shehla Gil, Nanha, Sabiha
1979	Aap Se Kya Parda		Mohammad Ali, Rangeela, Ali Ejaz, Shahnawaz, Saiqa, Ishrat Chaudhary
1980	Sardar		Asiya, Yousuf Khan, Iqbal Hassan, Rangeela, Talish
1980	Rishta		Shabnam, Nadeem, Sabiha, Allauddin, Saqi, Sabiha, Najma Mehboob
1981	Sher Medan Da		Asiya, Sultan Rahi, Mustafa Qureshi, Adeeb
1981	Sher Khan		Sultan Rahi, Mustafa Qureshi, Aliya, Nazli, Bahar, Habib, Nana, Adeeb, Seema, Iqbal Hassan
1981	Chan Varyam		Sultan Rahi, Iqbal Hasan, Afzaal, Mustafa Qureshi
1981	Sala Sahab		Mumtaz, Ali Ejaz, Nanha, Sultan Rahi, Nazli, Iqbal Hassan
1981	Chacha Bhateeja		Ali Ejaz, Nanha, Durdana Rehman, Khalid Saleem, Tamanna, Saqi, Mustafa Qureshi
1981	Milega Zulm Da Badla		Sultan Rahi, Chakori, Kaifi, Mustafa Qureshi
1981	Varyam		Sultan Rahi, Mustafa Qureshi, Mumtaz, Adeeb
1981	Jeedar		Sultan Rahi, Chakori, Kaifee, Mustafa Qureshi
1981	Muftbar		Sultan Rahi, Ali Ejaz, Huma Daar, Afzaal
1981	Chhanga Te Manga		Yousuf Khan, Sultan Rahi, Chakori, Bahar, Talish
1982	Do Bheega Zamin		Mumtaz, Sultan Rahi, Mustafa Qureshi, Ilyas Kashmiri
1982	Shaan		Mumtaz, Sultan Rahi, Mustafa Quresh, Adeeb, Bahar
1982	Aina Aur Zindagi		Ayaz, Waseem Abbas, Seemab, Sajjad Kishwar, Munawwar Saeed
1982	Dostana		Ali Ejaz, Nana, Shujaat Hashmi, Ilyas
1982	Jatt Mirza		Yousuf Khan, Fazil Butt, Nazli, Bahar, Ilyas
1983	Sahab Jee		Ali Ejaz, Nana, Durdana, Rangeela
1983	Qudrat		Ali Ejaz, Nana, Rangeela, Sultan Rahi
1983	Dashat Khan		Shahid, Ghulam Mohayuddin, Habib, Allauddin
1983	Heera Moti		Sultan Rahi, Mustafa Qureshi, Nazli, Chakori
1983	Chorun Qutab		Sultan Rahi, Mustafa Qureshi, Nazli, Naghma
1983	Shagird Moula Jatt Da		Ladla, Nazli, Shujait Hashmi, Zummurd
1983	Lawaris		Sultan Rahi, Iqbal Hassan, Adeeb
1983	Khan Veer		Iqbal Hassan, Shahid, Nazli, Bahar, Durdana
1983	Rustam Te Khan		Yousuf Khan, Sultan Rahi, Mustafa Qureshi
1983	Dushman Pyara		Ali Ejaz, Nanha, Rangeela, Iqbal Hassan
1983	Dara Baloch		Sultan Rahi, Mustafa Qureshi, Iqbal Hassan, Zummurd
1984	Mela Te Medan		Yousuf Khan, Mustafa Qureshi, Aliya
1984	Jagga Tay Shera		Sultan Rahi, Iqbal Hassan, Naghma
1984	Sholay		Sultan Rahi, Mustafa Qureshi, Ejaz, Anwar Khan
1984	Lal Toofan		Sultan Rahi, Mustafa Qureshi, Rangeela, Kahnum
1984	Commander		Sultan Rahi, Mustafa Qureshi, Iqbal Hassan
1984	Taqat		Sultan Rahi, Mustafa Qureshi, Kaifi, Chakori
1984	Baghi		Mustafa Qureshi, Mumtaz, Shujaat, Rangeela
1984	Khanu Dada		Iqbal Hassan, Mustafa Qureshi, Sultan Rahi, Nazli
1984	Kaliyar		Ejaz, Iqbal Hassan, Zamarrud
1984	Dulla Bhatti		Yousuf Khan, Mustafa Qureshi, Talish, Rangeela
1984	Baz Shehbaz		Sultan Rahi, Mustafa Qureshi, Naghma, Iqbal Hassan
1984	Pardesi Aain Piar		Reeta, Musthaq Changezi, Nasreen, Roshan
1984	Chann Cheeta		Sultan Rahi, Mustafa Qureshi, Iqbal Hassan, Firdous
1984	Lagaan		Sultan Rahi, Mustafa Qureshi, Shahida Mini
1985	Nikah		Ali Ejaz, Nanha Rangeela, Gori, Ilyas
1985	Chooriyan		Ali Ejaz, Nazli, Nanha
1985	Badle Di Aag		Sultan Rahi, Mustafa Qureshi, Iqbal Hassan
1985	Dhee Rani		Ali Ejaz, Yousuf Khan, Talish, Nanha
1985	Rishta Kaghaz Da		Ali Ejaz, Nanha, Nazli
1985	Qismat		Yousuf Khan, Sultan Rahi, Arifa Siddiqi, Ilyas Kashmiri
1985	Maa Puttar		Sultan Rahi, Mustafa Qureshi, Iqbal Hassan
1985	Lakha Daku		Sultan Rahi, Mustafa Qureshi, Nazli
1985	Ajab Khan		Yousuf Khan, Sultan Rahi, Babra, Afzal
1985	Sauday Bazi		Sultan Rahi, Ali Ejaz, Sangeeta, Nazli
1985	Khuddar		Anjuman, Mustafa Qureshi, Iqbal Hassan, Talish
1985	Jagga		Sultan Rahi, Mustafa Qureshi, Afzal, Yousuf
1985	Shah Behram		Sultan Rahi, Kaifi, Mohammad Ali, Iqbal Hassan
1985	Mehndi		Javed Shaikh, Sangeeta, Nanha, Rangeela, Afzal
1985	Ziddi Khan		Sultan Rahi, Mustafa Qureshi, Shahida Mini
1985	Wadera		Ghulam Mohayuddin, Arifa Siddiqi, Mustafa Qureshi
1986	Chann Te Surma		Sultan Rahi, Mustafa Qureshi, Mumtaz, Zummurud
1986	Do Qaidi		Sultan Rahi, Chakori, Mustafa Qureshi
1986	Qaidi		Sultan Rahi, Zumurrud, Firdous, Afzal
1986	Joora		Yousuf Khan, Ali Ejaz, Sangeeta, Bindia, Iqbal Hassan
1986	Chann Bahadur		Sultan Rahi, Mustafa Qureshi, Yousuf Khan
1986	Insaaf		Sultan Rahi, Mustafa Qureshi, Rangeela, Nazli
1986	Akbar Khan		Sultan Rahi, Gori, Mustafa Qureshi, Zummurud
1986	Hitler		Sultan Rahi, Mustafa Qureshi, Firdous, Habib
1986	Qarz		Sultan Rahi, Mohammad Ali, Irfan Khoost, Nana, Naghma, Bahar, Mustafa Qureshi
1986	Puttar Shahiye Da		Yousuf Khan, Sultan Rahi, Mustafa Qureshi
1986	Kali Basti		Sultan Rahi, Bazgha, Mustafa Qureshi
1986	Sanjhi Hathkari		Sultan Rahi, Mustafa Qureshi, Gori, Zumurrud
1986	Dara Gujjar		Sultan Rahi, Mustafa Qureshi, Zumurrud, Naghma
1986	Haq Such		Sultan Rahi, Mustafa Qureshi, Kaifi
1986	Qeemat		Sultan Rahi, Yousuf Khan, Zumurrud, Khanum
1986	Malanga		Sultan Rahi, Mustafa Qureshi, Ilyas Kashmiri
1986	Mela		Sultan Rahi, Mustafa Qureshi, Zumurrud, Gori
1986	Sher Bahadur		Sultan Rahi, Afzaal, Urooj, Zummurud
1987	Jugnu		Sultan Rahi, Talish, Babar, Sitara, Arifa
1987	Doli Te Hathkari		Sultan Rahi, Mustafa Qureshi, Bahar, Durdana
1987	Gernail Singh		Sultan Rahi, Mustafa Qureshi, Chakori, Nanha, Adeeb
1987	Disco Dancer		Yousuf Khan, Asif Khan, Rangeela, Nanha, Sheva
1987	Faqeeria		Sultan Rahi, Arifa Siddiqi, Mustafa Qureshi
1987	Silsila		Sultan Rahi, Mustafa Qureshi, Talish, Durdana
1987	Allah Rakha		Yousuf Khan, Sultan Rahi, Talish, Zumurrud
1987	Dulari		Sultan Rahi, Izhar Qazi, Ismail Shah
1987	Janbaaz		Sultan Rahi, Ghulam Mohayuddin, Sitara
1987	Ik Si Daku		Yousuf Khan, Mustafa Qureshi, Shahid, Afzal
1987	Bagroo		Shahid, Shehbaz, Talish, Akmal, Sawan, Sapna
1987	Tiger		Sultan Rahi, Sheeva, Sashma Shahee
1988	Shaka		Shehbaz Akmal, Babar, Afzal, Soniya, Nemat Sarhadi
1988	Bardasht		Izhar Qazi, Ghulam Mohayuddin, Ismail Shah
1988	Qismat Wala		Sultan Rahi, Mustafa Qureshi
1988	Noori		Sultan Rahi, Izhar Qazi, Afzal Ahmed, Ilyas
1988	Disco Leonei		Badar Minir, Sangeeta, Rangeela, Nemat Sarhadi
1988	Roti		Sultan Rahi, Mustafa Qureshi, Humayun Qureshi
1988	Hunter Wali		Sultan Rahi, Mustafa Qureshi, Rangeela, Humayun Qureshi
1988	Aakhri Muqadama		Ghulam Mohayuddin, Bahar, Iqbal Hassan
1989	Sikandra		Sultan Rahi, Ghulam Mohayuddin, Mustafa Qureshi
1989	Super Girl		Sultan Rahi, Gori, Hamayun Qureshi, Rangeela, Albela
1989	Qatil Haseena		Sultan Rahi, Akbar, Rangeela, Humayun Qureshi
1989	Maula Saeen		Sultan Rahi, Ghulam Mohayuddin, Rangeela, Mustafa Qureshi
1989	Aakhri Qatal		Sultan Rahi, Ghulam Mohayuddin, Mustafa Qureshi, Adeeb
1989	Zabardast		Sultan Rahi, Ghulam Mohayuddin, Talish
1989	Bilawal		Sultan Rahi, Talish, Afzal, Sitara, Albela, Jahanzeb
1989	Kalka		Sultan Rahi, Asif Khan, Afzal, Shahida Mini, Adeeb
1989	Daket		Sultan Rahi, Ghulam Mohayuddin, Mustafa Qureshi
1989	Changeza		Sultan Rahi, Hamayun Qureshi, Rangeela, Humayun Qureshi, Afzal, Abid Ali
1989	Achhoo 302		Sultan Rahi, Talish, Humayun Quresh, Afzal Ahmed
1989	Nangi Talwar		Javed Shaikh, Talish, Ghulam Mohayuddin
1989	Mazdoor		Sultan Rahi, Gori, Adeeb, Bahar, Humayun Qureshi
1990	Hoshiar		Sultan Rahi, Javed Shaikh, Kavita, Ghulam Mohayuddin, Ismail Shah
1990	Shera Baluch		Sultan Rahi, Naghma, Sangeeta, Deeba, Sonia
1990	Allah Waris		Sultan Rahi, Ghulam Mohayuddin, Humayun Qureshi
1990	Insaniyat Kay Dushman		Sultan Rahi, Nadeem, Neeli, Izhar Qazi, Abid Ali, Hamyun Qureshi, Afzaal
1990	Palay Khan		Sultan Rahi, Shahida Mini, Rangeela, Bahar, Humayun Qureshi
1990	Governor		Sultan Rahi, Izhar Qazi, Abid Ali, Humayun Qureshi
1990	Daku Haseena		Sultan Rahi, Izhar Qazi, Rangeela, Humayun Qureshi
1990	Lutera		Sultan Rahi, Adeeb. Durdana, Kanwal, Albela
1990	Sultana		Sultan Rahi, Ghulam Mohayuddin, Humayun Qureshi, Sonia
1990	Kali Charan		Sultan Rahi, Akbar, Sameena Peerzada, Rangeela, Shafquat Cheema
1990	Shadmani		Sultan Rahi, Mustafa Qureshi, Naghma, Rangeela, Humayun Qureshi
1990	Loha		Sultan Rahi, Mustafa Qureshi, Sitara, Babra, Gori
1990	Waliya		Sultan Rahi, Sonia, Babar, Bahar, Adeeb, Tengeela
1990	Malanga		Sultan Rahi, Qazi, Bahar, Albela, Humayun Qureshi
1990	Makhan Gujjar		Sultan Rahi, Babra Sharif, Rangeela, Bahar, Albela
1990	Paisa Naach Nachawe		Sultan Rahi, Javed Shaikh, Shakeela Qureshi
1990	Sarmaya		Sultan Rahi, Javed Shaikh, Waseem Abbas, Sonia, Shakeela
1990	Allah Shehanshah		Yousuf Khan, Javed Shaikh, Abid Ali, Bahar, Ilyas Kashmiri
1990	Jangi		Sultan Rahi, Izhar Qazi, Sahar, Naghma, Humayun Qureshi
1990	Sholay e Sholay		Sultan Rahi, Ghulam Mohayuddin, Muniza Shaikh, Asif Khan
1991	Bhangra		Sultan Rahi, Sawan, Bahar, Humayun Qureshi, Asif Khan
1991	Election		Sultan Rahi, Mustafa Qureshi, Gori, Saima, Humayun Qureshi
1991	Wehshi Dogar		Sultan Rahi, Hamyun Qureshi, Shahida Mini, Abid Ali
1991	Maula Te Mukho		Sultan Rahi, Madiha Shah, Tarique Shah, Ilyas Kashmiri
1991	Chiragh Bali		Sultan Rahi, Izhar Qazi, Ghulam Mohayuddin
1991	Billoo Badhshah		Sultan Rahi, Afzaal Ahmed, Muniza Shaikh, Jahanzeb
1991	Qanoon Apna Apna		Sultan Rahi, Ghulam Mohayuddin, Naghma, Humayun Qureshi
1991	Riaz Gujjar		Sultan Rahi, Hina Shaheen, Humayun Qureshi
1992	Khooni Sholay		Babra Sharif, Sultan Rahi, Nadeem, Bahar
1992	Bulanda		Sultan Rahi, Ghulam Mohayuddin, Shahida
1992	Hasinon Ki Baarat		Sultan Rahi, Javed Shaikh, Mohammad Ali
1992	Kakay Da Kharak		Sultan Rahi, Shahida Mini, Bahar
1992	Majhoo		Sultan Rahi, Reema, Ghulam Mohayuddin
1992	Hijrat		Sultan Rahi, Kavita, Izhar Qazi
1992	Surpa		Sultan Rahi, Ghulam Mohayuddin, Saiqa
1992	Wadera Sain		Ghulam Mohayuddin, Mustafa Qureshi
1992	Mehbooba		Reema, Shaan, Nadra, Nadeem, Hamayun
1992	Gawah Te Badmash		Sultan Rahi, Gori, Adeeb, Talish
1993	Subay Khan		Sultan Rahi, Reema, Javed Shaikh, Rangeela, Humayun
1994	Khandan		Sultan Rahi, Reema, Nadeem, Hamayun Qureshi
1994	Gujjar Badshah		Sultan Rahi, Reema, Izhar Qazi, Humayun
1994	Jabroo Te Malangi		Sultan Rahi, Mustafa Qureshi, Humayun Qureshi
1994	Bala Peeray Da		Sultan Rahi, Reema, Umer Sharif, Bahar, Humayun
1995	Dam Mast Qalandar		Sultan Rahi, Mohammad Ali, Rembo
1995	Madam Rani		Sultan Rahi, Reema, Nadeem, Hamayun Qureshi
1995	Mangal Khan		Sultan Rahi, Humayun Qureshi
1995	Golden Girl		Sultan Rahi, Shahida Mini, Izhar Qazi
1995	Khoon Da Hisab		Sultan Rahi, Humayun Qureshi
1999	Chohdrani		Saima, Shaan, Saud, Sabira, Shafqat Cheema
2000	Jug Mahi		Sana, Shaan, Saud, Nargis, Rembo, Ghulam Mohayuddin
2000	Peengan		Saud, Sana, Babu Ali, Irfan Khoost, Sardar Kamal
2000	Jatti Da Wair		Saud, Moamar Rana, Nargis, Afzal, Humayun

== Awards and recognition ==
Year	Award	Category	Result	Title	Ref.
1981	Nigar Award	Best Actress	Won	Sher Khan	
1982	Nigar Award	Best Actress	Won	Do Bigha Zameen	
1986	Nigar Award	Best Actress	Won	Qismet	
1990	Nigar Award	Best Actress	Won	Insaniyat Kay Dushman	
1999	Nigar Award	Special Award	Won	Contribution to Media Industry	
2022	21st Lux Style Awards	Chairperson's Lifetime Achievement Award	Won	Contribution to Media Industry	
2023	Pride of Performance	Award by the Government of Pakistan	Won	Contribution to Media Industry	

== See also ==
- List of Pakistani actresses
- Gori
