= Ilyas Kashmiri (actor) =

Pakistani actor (1925–2007)

Ilyas Kashmiri الیاس کشمیری
- Born: Mohammad Ilyas Kashmiri; 25 December 1925; Muhalla Dara Shikoh, Lahore, British India
- Died: 12 December 2007 (aged 81); Lahore, Pakistan
- Occupations: Actor, Producer
- Years active: 1945 – 2000
- Known for: Film roles as a villain
- Spouse: Parveen
- Children: Mozzam Ilyas (son), Asim Ilyas (son)
- Parent: Noor Din (father)

Mohammad Ilyas Kashmiri (25 December 1925 – 12 December 2007) was a Pakistani film actor.

== Early life and career ==
Born in Muhalla Dara Shikoh, near Rivoli Cinema, in Lahore, Punjab, British India, Kashmiri became an actor in Bombay before the Partition of India. Kashmiri appeared in more than 600 movies, mostly in villain roles. He was a handsome, well-built 6 feet 2 inches tall man suited for these villainous roles.

Due to his long acting career, he remained an inspiration for the beginners in the Pakistani film industry and was known as Taya Jee in the film world.

== Filmography ==
- Mundri (Punjabi-language film, 1949) (producer: Agha G. A. Gul)
- Mahi Munda (1956)
- Kismet (1956)
- Yakke Wali (1957)
- Waada (1957)
- Mukhra (1958)
- Ishq Par Zorr Nahin (1963) (producer: Ilyas Kashmiri)
- Imam Din Gohavia (1967)
- Mera Ghar Meri Jannat (1968)
- Zarqa (1969)
- Rangeela (1970)
- Khushia (1973)
- Banarsi Thug (1973 film) (1973)
- Ziddi (1973)
- Sharif Badmash (1975)
- Bin Badal Barsaat (1975)
- Wehshi Jatt (1975)
- Aik Gunnah Aur Sahi (1975)
- Mera Naam Hai Mohabbat (1975)
- Chitra Tay Shera (1976)
- Seeta Maryam Margaret (1978)
- Ranga Daku (1979)
- General Bakht Khan (1979)
- Behram Daku (1980)
- Sher Khan (1981)
- Chan Varyam (1981)
- Chan Suraj (1981)
- Anokha Daaj (1981)
- Maidan (1982)
- Ik Doli (1982)
- Charda Suraj (1982)
- Rustam Te Khan (1983)
- Sher Mama (1983)
- Dara Baloch (1983)
- Jagga Tay Shera (1984)
- Kalia (1984)
- Malanga (1986)
- Mela (1986)
- Joora (1986)
- Qaidi (1986)
- Moti Sher (1987)
- Saranga (1994)
- Madam Rani (1995)

== Death ==
Ilyas Kashmiri died on 12 December 2007 in Lahore, aged 81. He had been bed-ridden for the previous six years. He had been suffering from diabetes for some years and his left leg was amputated a few years ago due to diabetes-related complications. His wife, Parveen, had died ten years before him.

== See also ==
- List of Lollywood actors
