= Zahir Shah (actor) =

Zahir Shah (Urdu: ظاہر شاہ) (1947 – 13 June 2017) was a Pakistani film actor working in Lollywood. He is best known for playing villainous roles in Punjabi films. He has been credited with working in over 600 films. He was introduced to film industry through the film Yaari Dosti by director Altaf Hussain. Later in his career, Shah also briefly worked at theater as a stage actor.

== Death ==
Shah died on 14 June 2017 at the age of 70 in a hospital at Lahore. He was buried at a graveyard in Sargodha, Sargodha.

== Filmography ==
Shah has worked in the following films:

- Budha Sher (Punjabi - Color - Friday, 12 July 2002)
- Double Cross (Urdu - Color - Wednesday, 13 August 1980)
- Geo Shera (Punjabi - Black & White - Friday, 5 June 1981)
- Halaku Khan (Pashto - Color - Friday, 6 January 1995)
- Hitler (Punjabi - Color - Monday, 9 June 1986)
- Ilaqa Incharge (Punjabi - Color - Friday, 27 April 1984)
- Imtehan (Pashto - Black & White - Friday, 15 April 1983)
- Karma (Punjabi - Color - Friday, 16 June 1989)
- Malka (Punjabi - Color - Friday, 7 August 1987)
- Marshal (Punjabi - Color - Wednesday, 4 July 1990)
- Miss Allah Rakhi (Punjabi - Color - Sunday, 7 May 1989)
- Remand (Punjabi - Color - Friday, 27 April 1979)
- Shikra (Punjabi - Color - Thursday, 20 June 1985)
- Yaari Dosti
- Jaanbaaz
- Qatil
- Remaand
- Shehnai
- Zulm Da Toofan
- 1981 - Khan-e-Azam
- 1984 - Kalia
- 1986 - Qaidi
- 1987 - Silsila
- 1993 - Zabata
