= Wajahat Attre =

Pakistani film music composer (1945 - 2017)

- وجاہت عطرے
- Born: 1945; Puna, Gujarat, British India
- Died: 26 May 2017 (aged 71–72); Lahore, Pakistan
- Occupation: Film music director
- Years active: 1969 – 2013
- Awards: Won 9 Nigar Awards during his career Tamgha-i-Imtiaz (Medal of Excellence) award by the President of Pakistan in 2013

Wajahat Attre (1945 – 26 May 2017) was a Pakistani music director who composed around 3000 songs for over 200 films.

== Early life ==
Wajahat Attre was born in Puna, Gujarat, British India in 1945. After the independence of Pakistan in 1947, his family migrated to Pakistan. His father, Rasheed Attre (1919 – 1967) also was a noted film music composer of Pakistan and originally belonged to Amritsar, Punjab, British India.

== Career ==
Wajahat composed music for over 200 films, among them Mukhra (1988 film), Chan Varyam (1981), Naukar Wohti Da (1974 film) and Ishq Khuda (2013 film) became musical hits. He churned out popular songs like Wagdi Nadi Da Paani, Vay Ik Tera Pyar Menu Mileya, Aanda Teray Layi Reshmi Rumal. He worked with singers like Noor Jehan, Humaira Channa, Saira Naseem, Shabnam Majeed and Azra Jehan.

Wajahat Attre used to be his father's chief assistant for many years before his father's death on 18 December 1967. So he took up the same profession as his father and eventually became one of the most sought after film music composers in Pakistan in the 1970s and 1980s.

Wajahat Attre worked with eminent film playback singers like Noor Jehan, Saira Naseem, Humaira Channa, Azra Jehan and Shreya Goshal during his long film career and composed music for more than 3,000 film songs in over 200 films.

== Popular songs ==
Song title	Sung by	Lyrics by	Music by	Film notes
Raqs zanjeer pehan ker bhi kiya jata hai	Mehdi Hassan	Habib Jalib	Rasheed Attre and Wajahat Attre	Zarqa (1969 film); This particular song was reportedly composed by Wajahat Attre because his father Rasheed Attre had died during the filming of Zarqa
Ishqay Di Kook Sun Kay, Koi Uttar Paharun Aya	Noor Jehan	Hazin Qadri	Wajahat Attre	Teray Ishq Nachaya (1969)
Aanda teray layi reshmi rumal	Noor Jehan	Ahmad Rahi	Wajahat Attre	Nikke Hondyan Da Pyar (1969)
Wagdi nadi da paani, ainj jaa ke murr nahin aanda	Noor Jehan	Hazin Qadri	Wajahat Attre	Ishq Na Puchhay Zaat (1969)
Toonba wajda eei na taar bina	Noor Jehan	Khawaja Pervaiz	Wajahat Attre	Naukar Wohti Da (1974 film)
Zindagi Tamasha Bani, Dunya Da Hasa Bani, Kittay Vi Na Pyar Milia	Afshan	Khawaja Pervaiz	Wajahat Attre	Naukar Wohti Da (1974)
Jatt Kurrian Taun Darda Mara, Jawani Che Malang Ho Gaya	Noor Jehan and Masood Rana	Khawaja Pervaiz	Wajahat Attre	Jatt Kurrian Taun Darda (1976)
Doorun Bari Doorun, Tera Khatt Aaya Dholna	Mehnaz Begum and Ahmad Rushdi	Hazin Qadri	Wajahat Attre	Aj Diyan Kurrian (1977 film); Wajahat Attre won a Nigar Award for 'Best Music Director' for this film
Kallian Na Jaana, Saaday Naal Naal Chalo Jee	Naheed Akhtar, Mehnaz and Shazia	Hazin Qadri	Wajahat Attre	Aj Diyan Kurrian (1977 film)
Sunn Sunn Bhabhi Dhol Piya Wajda	Noor Jehan and Mehnaz	Hazin Qadri	Wajahat Attre	Chan Varyam (1981 film)
Saif Ul Malook 1 - Awwal Hamd Sana-e-Ilahi	Shaukat Ali	Hazin Qadri	Wajahat Attre	Chan Varyam (1981 film)
Wey Sonay Daya Kangana, Sauda Ikko Jiya	Noor Jehan	Hain Qadri	Wajahat Attre	Chan Varyam (1981 film)
Jhanjharia pehna dou, Bindiya vi chamka duo	Noor Jehan	Khawaja Pervaiz	Wajahat Attre	Sher Khan (1981)
Tu Jay Mere Hamesha Kole Rawein, Mein Dunya Nuun Keh Dawaan Paray Paray	Noor Jehan	Khawaja Pervaiz	Wajahat Attre	Sher Khan (1981)
Vay ik tera pyar meinu mileya, mein dunya taun hore ki leina	Noor Jehan	Khawaja Pervaiz	Wajahat Attre	Sala Sahib (1981)
Haaye O' Meria Dhadia Rabba, Kinnan Jammian Kinnan Ne Laye Jaanian	Noor Jehan		Wajahat Attre	Dhee Rani (1985)
Mundia, Dopatta Chhad Mera, Nahin Sharmaan Da Ghund Laaey Da	Noor Jehan, Nadeem	Khawaja Pervaiz	Wajahat Attre	Mukhra (1988 film); Wajahat Attre again won the Nigar Award for Best Music Director in this film
Mein Jeena Teray Naal, Jeevaan Din Chaar, Pahvein Jeevaan Sau Saal	Shreya Goshal	Riaz ur Rehman Saghar	Wajahat Attre	Mohabbataan Sachiyaan (2007 film)

== Awards ==
- Tamgha-i-Imtiaz (Medal of Excellence) award by the President of Pakistan in 2013.
- Wajahat Attre won a total of 9 Nigar Awards as Best Music Director in 1974, 1976, 1977, 1980, 1981, 1983, 1988, 1990 and in 1997.

== Death ==
Wajahat Attre died on 26 May 2017 at the age of 72. He was suffering from heart disease and paralysis after a stroke a month prior to his heart attack. He was laid to rest at Miani Sahib Graveyard in Lahore, Pakistan.
