= Sultan Rahi =

Pakistani actor

- ﺳﻠﻄﺎﻥ ﺭﺍﮨﯽ
- Born: Muhammad Sultan Khan; 24 June 1938; Rawalpindi, Punjab, British India
- Died: 9 January 1996 (aged 57); Gujranwala, Punjab, Pakistan
- Cause of death: Murder
- Occupations: Actor; producer; screenwriter
- Years active: 1956–1996
- Spouse(s): Shaheen (divorce); Naseem Sultan
- Children: 5
- Awards: Nigar Awards

Sultan Rahi (Urdu: ﺳﻠﻄﺎﻥ ﺭﺍﮨﯽ; June 24, 1938 – January 9, 1996) was a Pakistani actor, producer and screenwriter. He established himself as one of the leading and most successful actors of country's Punjabi cinema, and received a reputation as Pakistan's "Clint Eastwood".

During a career spanning 40 years, he acted in some 703 Punjabi films and 100 Urdu films, winning around 160 awards. His first film was the Urdu-language Baghi in 1956. He was 18 years old at the time. This was the first Pakistani film to be screened in China. Rahi acted with many heroines but he was known for his duo with Anjuman; Khoon da Hisab (1995) was his last film with Anjuman.

Rahi earned two Nigar Awards, for his work in Babul (1971) and Basheera (1972). In 1975 he portrayed the character of Maula Jatt in Wehshi Jatt, winning his third Nigar Award. He reprised the role in its sequel Maula Jatt (1979), his best-known film. Some of his other films include Sher Khan, Sharif Badmash, Chan Veryam, Kaley Chore, The Godfather, Sharif Badmash and Wehshi Gujjar.

== Early life and family ==
His father, Subedar Major Abdul Majeed, was a retired officer from the British Indian Army who belonged to a Punjabi Arain family.

According to Mushtaq Gazdar, Rahi was born in Rawalpindi, Punjab, British India, in 1938. Other sources state that he was born in an Urdu-speaking family in Muzaffarnagar in the Saharanpur division of Uttar Pradesh who migrated to Pakistan after the partition of India, first to Karachi and then to Rawalpindi.

He had five children, of which one, Haider Sultan, is also an actor.

== Career ==
He began his film career in 1956 as a guest actor in the film Baghi. His first breakthrough came with the film Wehshi Jatt (1975). This was the unofficial prequel to Maula Jatt (1979). Maula Jatt was released on 11 February 1979, which became his most successful Pakistani film. His other works include Behram Daku (1980), Sher Khan (1981), Sala Sahib and Ghulami (1985).

Sultan Rahi appeared in key roles in over 535 films.

== Murder ==
On 9 January 1996, Rahi and his friend Ahsan, a film director, were travelling from Islamabad to Lahore on the main highway in Pakistan, Grand Trunk Road. Their vehicle got a flat tyre near Aimanabad Chungi, not far from Gujranwala.

While they were changing the tyre, thieves approached the vehicle and tried to rob them. Rahi and his friend were both shot; Rahi succumbed to his wounds.

== Legacy ==
Rahi worked in the Punjabi film industry for over four decades.

He was the highest paid Pakistani actor of his time.

He was named in the Guinness Book of World Records as the most prolific actor.

Bahar Begum reacted by saying: "I remember Sultan always saying that this industry will miss him when he’s gone but at the time, I don’t think we fully understood what he meant, but he truly proved his worth, There was only one Sultan Rahi in Lollywood and there will always be one Sultan Rahi – no one can replace him".

Mustafa Qureshi commented that "Our onscreen chemistry was unique in a number of ways. Our pairing was the most popular film partnership throughout Lollywood's history, It’s true, there will never be another Sultan Rahi, ever. Everything he earned was a result of sheer hard work and talent".

Film director Pervaiz Rana added: "Even though we are still making Punjabi films and many new heroes have entered and left the industry, I don’t think the golden era of Sultan Rahi will ever come back. His dialogues are etched in our hearts and memories, It’s the country’s love for Sultan that continues to reflect in his pictures and posters being plastered in shops and on buses."

== Awards and honours ==
Nigar Awards

Won

- Nigar Awards 1971 - Special Award for Babul
- Nigar Awards 1972 - Best Actor for Basheera
- Nigar Awards 1975 - Best Actor for Wehshi Jatt

== Discography ==
- Alif Allah Chambe Di Booti, Vol. 1, Oriental Star Agencies, 1996 (re-released in 2015).
- Sajda, Vol. 2, Oriental Star Agencies, 1996.

== Bibliography ==
Zāhid ʻAkāsī, Sult̤ān Rāhī : Pākistānī Filmon̲ Kā Sult̤ān, Lahore : Jumhuri Publications, 2019 (reprint of the 2010 edition), 169 p. Biography.

== See also ==
- List of Pakistani Punjabi-language films
- List of Lollywood actors
