= Mustafa Qureshi filmography =

Below is the complete filmography of the Pakistani actor Mustafa Qureshi.

== 1950s-1960s ==
Year	Title
1958	Pardesi
1967	Lakhon Mein Ek
1968	Katari
1968	Dil Diya Dard Liya
1969	Aasra
1969	Aneela
1969	Zindagi Kitin Haseen Hay
1969	Nazneen
1969	Andleeb

== 1970s ==
Year	Title
1970	Hum Joli
1970	Be-wafa
1971	Khak Aur Khoon
1973	Sarhad ki Goad Mein
1973	Dil ka Shehar
1973	4 Khoon Day Pyasay
1973	Nadiya Kay Paar
1974	Aabroo
1974	Chahat
1974	Jigar Da Tukra
1974	Shikar
1974	Khatarnak
1974	Jadoo
1975	Aarzoo
1975	Reshma Jawan Ho Gayi
1975	Watan Iman
1975	Sharif Badmash
1975	Anari
1975	Dharti Lal Kanwar
1975	Dil Ruba
1975	Hathkari
1975	Athra
1975	Hewan
1975	Jailor Tay Qaidi
1975	Zanjeer
1976	Khoufnak
1976	Ayyash
1976	Yaar Da Sehra
1976	Toofan
1976	Yarana
1976	Licence
1976	Ann Daata
1976	Akh Lari Bado Badi
1976	Mafroor
1976	Hashar Nashar
1977	Aawara
1977	Do Chor
1977	Tera vi Jawab Nein
1977	Aakhri Medaan
1977	Dada
1977	Teen Badshah
1977	Lahori Badshah
1977	Jeera Sain
1977	Sargent
1977	Qanoon
1977	Jabroo
1977	Chor Sipahi
1977	Jeenay Ki Rah
1977	Shaheen
1977	Naya Suraj
1977	Suha Jora
1977	Mohabbat Mar Nahin Sakti
1977	Teesri Qasam
1977	Baghi Tay Qanoon
1977	Aakhri Goli
1978	Nidarr
1978	Aag Aur Zindagi
1978	Qatil tay Smuggler
1978	Chori Mera Kaam
1978	Lathi Charge
1978	Cheeta Chalbaz
1978	Guarantee
1978	Aali Jah
1978	Heera Tay Basheera
1978	Alaram
1978	Accident
1978	Body Guard
1978	Akbar Amar Anthony
1978	Zindagi
1978	Tax
1978	Khan Dost
1978	Santri Badshah
1978	Puttar Phannay Khan Da
1978	Goga
1978	Shola
1978	Dushman Ki Talash
1978	Boycott
1978	Curfew Order
1978	Lalkara
1978	Sharif Ziddi
1979	Parwarish
1979	Maula Jatt
1979	Adawat
1979	Griftar
1979	Chalaan
1979	Jeenay Ki Saza
1979	Remand
1979	Badla
1979	Hathiar
1979	Makhan Khan
1979	Jatt Da Kharak
1979	Lal Aandhi
1979	Bakka Rath
1979	Ziddi Jatt
1979	Nizam Daku
1979	Ik Sharif so Badmash
1979	Sangeen Jurm
1979	Mout Meri Zindagi
1979	Shera Tay Cheeta
1979	Kashmakash
1979	Dangal
1979	Anjaam
1979	Jail Da Badshah
1979	Nawabzadi
1979	Gehray Zakham
1979	Sohni Dharti
1979	Iqbal-E-Jurm
1979	Machlay Khan
1979	Tandur

== 1980s ==
Year	Title
1980	Harasat
1980	Shikanja
1980	Aatish
1980	Do Toofaan
1980	Smuggler
1980	Zakhmoona
1980	Yaar Dushman
1980	Mann Mauji
1980	Double Cross
1980	Jhagra
1980	Do Nishan
1981	Dushman Dar
1981	Shart
1981	Kala Rupia
1981	Khan-e-Azam
1981	Dil Ek Khilona
1981	Ik Puttar Ik Veer
1981	Mr.Aflatoon
1981	Sher Medaan Da
1981	Jurm tay Insaf
1981	Moula Dad
1981	Sheran Day Puttar Sher
1981	Toofan Tay Chattan
1981	Athra Puttar
1981	Milay Ga Zulm Da Badla
1981	Sher Khan
1981	Chan Varyam
1981	Jatt Da Vair
1981	Veryam
1981	Dara Sikandar
1981	Chan Suraj
1981	Jeedar
1981	Maula Jatt in London
1981	Sultan tay Veryam
1981	Notan Da Badshah
1982	Black warrant
1982	Mout Kay Soudagar
1982	Bharia Mela
1982	Sangsar
1982	Shanakhat Parade
1982	Paasban
1982	Wichhria Puttar
1982	Ik Doli
1982	Do Bhiga Zamin
1982	Maidan
1982	Haidar Sultan
1982	Shaan
1982	Charda Suraj
1982	Khatra 440
1982	Jagat Tay Murad
1982	Yaar Beli
1983	Jatt Te Dogar
1983	Des Pardes
1983	Raka
1983	Moti Dogar
1983	Jatt Gujjar Tay Natt
1983	Murad Khan
1983	Kala Samundar
1983	Toofan Tay Toofan
1983	Border Built
1983	Heera Moti
1983	Chorun Qutab
1983	Lawaris
1983	Baghi Sher
1983	Wadda Khan
1983	Rustam Te Khan
1983	Wehshi Tola
1983	Sher Mama
1983	Dushman Pyara
1983	Dara Baloch
1984	Hathan wich Hath
1984	Mela Tay Medaan
1984	Kalia
1984	Sholay
1984	Lal Toofan
1984	Taqat
1984	Jagga Tay Reshma
1984	Commander
1984	Baghi
1984	Ucha Shamla Jatt Da
1984	Tawaan
1984	Dulla Bhatti
1984	Baz Shehbaz
1984	Sajawal Daku
1984	Pukar
1984	Chan Cheeta
1984	Laraka
1984	Lagaan
1985	Sajjan Dushman
1985	Badlay Di Agg
1985	Chan Baloch
1985	Black Mail
1985	Babar Khan
1985	Lakha Daku
1985	Hong Kong kay Sholay
1985	Maa Puttar
1985	Haidar Khan
1985	Sheesh Naag
1985	Khuddar
1985	Jagga
1985	Ghulami
1985	Shah Behram
1985	Ziddi Khan
1985	Halaku tay Khan
1985	Wadera
1985	Jani Dushman
1986	Zulm Da Toofan
1986	Dhanak
1986	Baghi Sipahi
1986	Griftari
1986	Chan Tay Soorma
1986	Do Qaidi
1986	Qaidi
1986	Yeh Adam
1986	Chan Bahadur
1986	Insaf
1986	Hitler
1986	Charhda Toofan
1986	Chall So Chall
1986	Akbar Khan
1986	Qarz
1986	Puttar Shahiye Da
1986	Agg Da Darya
1986	Kali Basti
1986	Sanjhi Hathkhari
1986	Dara Gujjar
1986	Haq Such
1986	Puttar Sheran Day
1986	Malanga
1986	Mela
1986	Balocha tay Daku
1987	Doli Tay Hathkari
1987	Gernail Singh
1987	Kala Toofan
1987	Jabar Khan
1987	Dunya
1987	Rajput
1987	Silsila
1987	Faqeeria
1987	Malka
1987	Ik Si Daku
1987	Khanu Sher
1987	Zidbazi
1988	Commando Action
1988	Daku Ki Larki
1988	Jatt Majhay Da
1988	Aag Hi Aag
1988	Choron ka Badshah
1988	Meri Adalat
1988	Allah Dad
1988	Qismat wala
1988	Sheru Tay Sultan
1988	Hunter Wali
1988	Roti
1989	Jan Nisar
1989	Sikandra
1989	Moula Sain
1989	Da Daku Lur
1989	Aakhri Qatil
1989	Badshah
1989	Dakiet
1989	Manila kay Janbaz
1989	Zulm Da Suraj
1989	Barood Ki Chhaon Mein
1989	Da Zulm Anjaam
1989	Sheran Di Maa
1989	Barish
1989	Inteqam Ham Lain Gay
1989	Meri HathJori

== 1990s ==
Year	Title
1990	Babul
1990	International Goreelay
1990	Jangju Goreelay
1990	Jailor
1990	Shadmani
1990	Loha
1990	Dushmani
1990	Qudrat Da Inteqam
1990	Choron Di Rani
1990	Sher Dil
1991	Sar Phira
1991	Action
1991	Chan Meray
1991	Naag Devta
1991	Teen Yakkay Teen Chhakkay
1991	Cobra
1991	Pyar Karna Tun Nein Darna
1991	Bakhtawar
1991	Darya Khan
1992	Consular
1992	Khoon ka Qarz
1992	Deputy
1992	Wadero Sain
1992	Gawah Tay Badmash
1992	God Father
1992	Akhara
1993	Malakhro
1993	Yaadgar
1993	Insaniyat
1993	Mazboot
1993	Ghal Badshah
1994	Chalti ka Naam Gari
1994	Gujjar Da Vair
1994	Pajero Group
1994	Jabroo Tay Malangi
1994	Ziddi Gujjar
1995	Jeeva
1995	Main Nay Pyar Kiya
1995	Sargam
1996	Ghunda Gardi
1996	Chief Sahib
1996	Sajawal
1996	Mummy
1996	Do Jeedar
1996	Saza
1996	Rani Khan
1997	Miss Klashankoff
1997	Takkar
1997	Khar Damagh Gujjar
1998	Dupatta
1998	Khatarnak Haseena

== 2000s ==
Year	Title
2000	Angaray
2000	Reshma
2000	Love in Holland
2000	Marvi
2000	Beti
2000	Nooran
2003	Bandish
2004	Jageer
2007	Puttar Hamayun Gujjar Da
2007	Suha Jora
2008	Zill-e-Shah
2009	Allah Uttay Dorian

== 2010s ==
Year	Title
2010	Wohti Lay Kay Jani Ay
2010	Lado Rani
2012	Sharika
2012	Sher Dil
2014	Sultanat
2017	Shor Sharaba
2017	Chain Aye Na
2019	Talash

Title	Note
Jhol	Urdu film
Shanakhat Parade	Punjabi film
Aadhi Larki	Urdu film
Takkar	Punjabi films

== Television ==
Year	Title	Role	Channel
2007	Commander Safeguard's	Germander	Webcast
2008	Commander Safeguard's	Germander	Webcast
