= Khan-e-Azam (film) =

1981 film

Khan-E-Azam خانِ اعظم
- Directed by: Yunus Malik
- Written by: Nasir Adib
- Produced by: Suhail Ahmad Gaba
- Starring: Sudhir; Sultan Rahi; Mustafa Qureshi; Aasia; Nazli; Bahar; Jameel Babar; Seema, Shakeel; Iqbal Durrani; Ladla; Irfan Khoosat; Zahir Shah
- Narrated by: Suhail Ahmad Gaba
- Cinematography: Masud Butt
- Edited by: Qasir Zamir; Zamir Qamir
- Music by: Wajahat Attre
- Production company: Bari Studio
- Distributed by: Gaba Productions
- Release date: 6 February 1981
- Running time: 140 minutes
- Country: Pakistan
- Language: Punjabi

Khan-E-Azam (Punjabi) is a 1981 Pakistani action and musical film, directed by Yunus Malik and produced by Suhail Ahmad Gaba.

The film stars Sudhir, Sultan Rahi, Mustafa Qureshi, Aasia and Zahir Shah.

== Cast ==
- Sudhir as Khan-E-Azam
- Sultan Rahi as Nadir
- Mustafa Qureshi as Babar
- Aasia
- Nazli
- Bahar
- Zahir Shah
- Irfan Khoosat
- Jameel Babar
- Seema
- Shakeel
- Iqbal Durrani
- Ladla
- Nasrullah Butt
- Irfan Khoost
- Azhar Khan
- Asim Qureshi

== Soundtrack ==
The music of Khan-E-Azam is composed by Wajahat Attre, with lyrics penned by Khawaja Pervez.

Khan-E-Azam

Soundtrack album by Wajahat Attre
- Released: 6 February 1981
- Recorded: 1981
- Genre: Film soundtrack
- Length: 22:18
- Language: Punjabi
- Label: EMI Musical
- Director: Yunus Malik
- Producer: Suhail Ahmad Gaba
- Compiler: Khawaja Pervez

Wajahat Attre chronology
Sheran Day Puttar Sher (1981)	Khan-E-Azam (1981)	Maidan (1982)

=== Track listing ===
No.	Title	Artist(s)	Length
1.	"Munsif Howay Badshah Fer Zulm Nein Rehnda..."	Shaukat Ali & Co.	1:30
2.	"O Jatta Ashkay Jawan Main Teray Sadqay..."	Naheed Akhtar	3:55
3.	"We Main Pyar Tere Nal Karna..."	Naheed Akhtar	3:01
4.	"Kar Laee We Kar Laee Tu..."	Naheed Akhtar	5:08
5.	"Oy Rang Pyar De, .."	Naheed Akhtar, Shaukat Ali	7:14
6.	"Pyar Di Khatir Rabb Nay Sari Khed Rachai A..."	Alam Lohar	1:00
