= Athra Puttar =

1981 films

- Directed by: Altaf Hussain; Khalid Hussain
- Written by: Hazin Qadri
- Produced by: Chaudhry Mohammad Arif
- Starring: Sultan Rahi; Asiya; Ali Ejaz; Bazigha; Mustafa Qureshi; Nanha; Rangeela; Ilyas Kashmiri; M. Ajmal; Sawan
- Narrated by: Chaudhry Ismail
- Cinematography: Parvez Khan
- Edited by: Qaisar Mastana
- Music by: Wajahat Attre ***film song lyrics = Hazin Qadri
- Production company: Ismail Productions
- Release date: 12 June 1981 (Pakistan)
- Running time: 160 minutes
- Country: Pakistan
- Language: Punjabi

Athra Puttar (Punjabi: اتھر۱ پتر) (transl. Headstrong son) is a 1981 Pakistani Punjabi-language action comedy musical film, directed by Altaf Hussain and produced by Chaudhry Mohammad Arif. The film stars Sultan Rahi, Mustafa Qureshi, Aasia, Ali Ejaz, Nanha and Bazigha.

== Cast ==
- Sultan Rahi as Jamau
- Mustafa Qureshi as Sooraj
- Aasia as Lachhi
- Ali Ejaz
- Bazigha
- Ajmal Khan
- Nanha
- Rangeela
- Khalid Saleem Mota
- Shahida
- Sheikh Iqbal
- Ilyas Kashmiri
- Sawan
- Azhar Khan
- Cham Cham

== Crew ==
- Writer - Hazin Qadri
- Producer - Chaudhry Mohammad Arif
- Production Company - Ismail Productions
- Cinematographer - Parvez Khan
- Music Director - Wajahat Attre
- Lyricist - Hazin Qadri
- Playback Singers - Noor Jehan, Naheed Akhtar, Inayat Hussain Bhatti, Masood Rana, Shaukat Ali, Albela

== Soundtrack ==
Song	Singers	Song length	Notes
"Kalla Mar Challian, Kanwara Mar Challian"	Masood Rana and Albela	5:48	A popular song
"Way Aaja Jani Dildara"	Noor Jehan	3:41	A popular song
"Dil Wich Howe Khich Pyar Di"	Noor Jehan	2:47	A popular song
"Kittiyan Ne Barrian Salaaman, Suun Jaa"	Noor Jehan	3:03	
"Mein Puttar Pakistan Da"	Inayat Hussain Bhatti, Shaukat Ali, Naheed Akhtar	6:34	A popular song
"Aa Ja Veera Tenu"	Noor Jehan		
