= Shola (film) =

Pakistani film

- شعلہ
- Directed by: Rehmat Ali
- Screenplay by: Bashir Niaz
- Story by: Jalil Afghani
- Produced by: K. Hussain
- Starring: Asif Khan; Najma; Mustafa Qureshi; Usman Pirzada; Bindiya; Sabiha Khanum; Badar Munir; Nanha; Seema Begum; Ilyas Kashmiri
- Cinematography: Tehsin Khan
- Music by: Kamal Ahmed
- Production company: C.M.I. Productions
- Release date: 12 November 1978
- Country: Pakistan
- Language: Punjabi

Shola (Punjabi: شعلہ, transl. Flame) is a 1978 Pakistani Punjabi-language film directed by Rehmat Ali.

The lead cast includes Asif Khan, Najma, Mustafa Qureshi, Usman Pirzada, and Bindiya. It was an action thriller movie which won 4 Nigar Awards, including the Best Punjabi Film Award for the year 1978.

== Plot ==
The story of Shola revolves around a revenge theme.

== Cast ==
- Najma
- Asif Khan
- Mustafa Qureshi
- Bindiya
- Usman Pirzada
- Adeeb
- Badar Munir
- Tariq Azia
- Nanha
- Shahnawaz
- Jalil Afghani
- Seema
- Kemal Irani
- Ilyas Kashmiri
- Sabiha Khanum

== Music and soundtracks ==
The music was composed by Kamal Ahmed and lyrics were penned by Hazeen Qadri and Saeed Gilani:

- Dhada Charia A Ishq Da Rang Mahia... Singer(s): Nahid Akhtar
- Dil Mangda Tera Pyar, Tut Tut Tara Ra Ra Rampa... Singer(s): Nahid Akhtar
- Ik Alhar Kurri Way Aria, Teray Uttay Dhull Geyi... Singer(s): Nahid Akhtar
- Khat Aya Meray Sajna Da, Khat Parh Kay Chham Chham Nachan... Singer(s): Mehnaz
- Lakk Patla Hularay Khaway, Meithun Kalian Na Chukia Jaway... Singer(s): Nahid Akhtar
- Tu Agar Chahay To Qatray Ko Samundar Kar Day... Singer(s): Nahid Akhtar, Rajab Ali, Ghulam Abbas

== Awards ==
Year	Film	Award	Category	Awardee	Ref.
1978	Shola	Nigar Award	Best film	K. Hussain	
1978	Shola	Nigar Award	Best actress	Najma	
1978	Shola	Nigar Award	Best actor	Asif Khan	
1978	Shola	Nigar Award	Best director	Rehmat Ali	
