= Fazal Ahmad Karim Fazli =

Pakistani film director and poet 1906-1981)

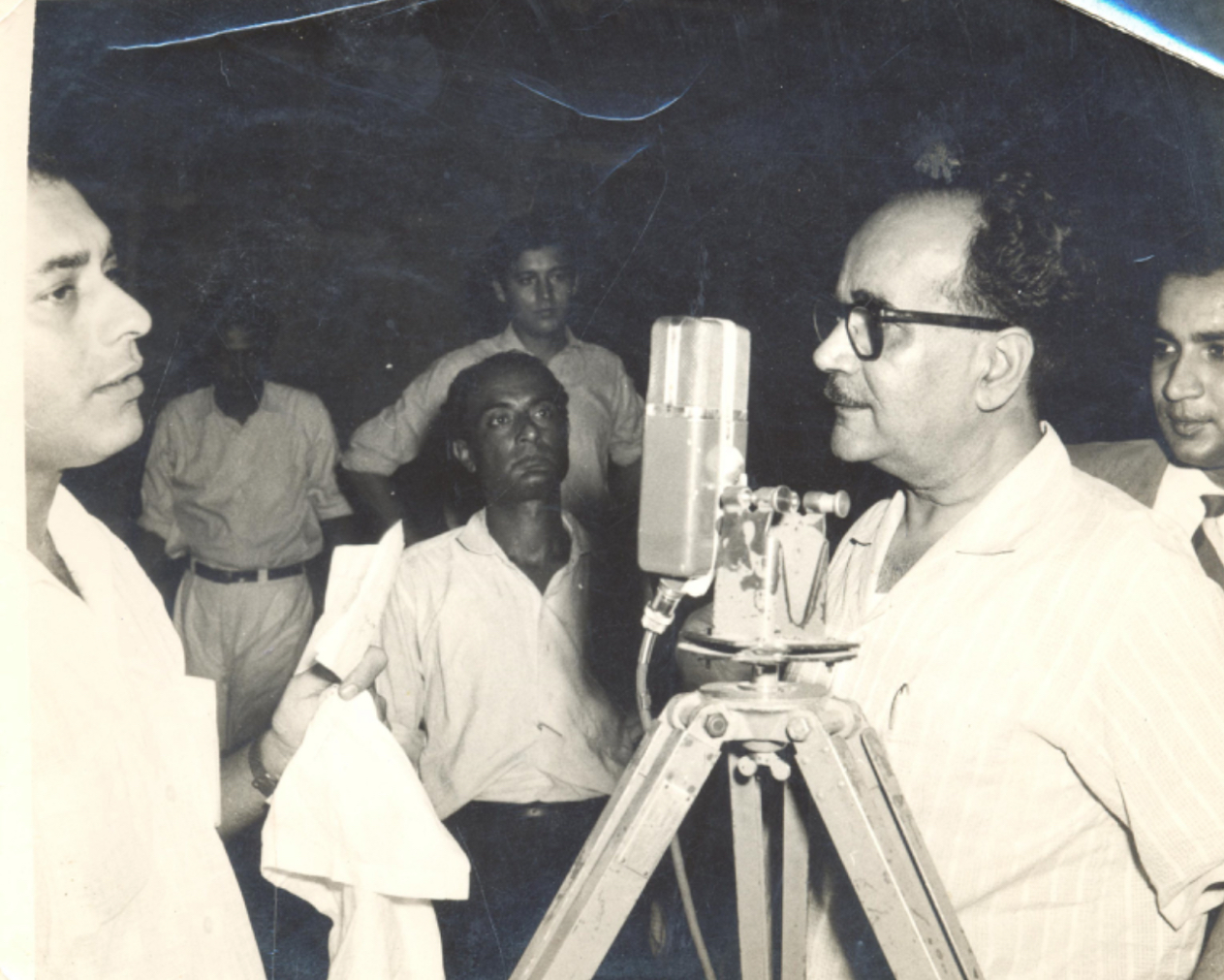
- Fazal Ahmad Karim Fazli
- Born: Syed Fazal Ahmad Karim Fazli; 5 November 1906; Azamgarh, British India
- Died: 17 December 1981 (aged 75); Karachi, Sindh, Pakistan
- Other names: Fazli and Chacha Abba
- Education: Ewing Christian College; University of Oxford
- Occupations: Bureaucrat; Poet; Novelist; Director; Writer; Producer
- Years active: 1938–1981
- Children: 3
- Relatives: Mansoor Khan (nephew)
- Awards: Nigar Award in 1962

Fazal Ahmad Karim Fazli (5 November 1906 – 17 December 1981) was a Pakistani civil servant, Urdu poet, novelist, and filmmaker.

He held positions in the Indian Civil Service before and after the partition of India. Following his retirement from public service in 1959, he embarked on a full-time career in filmmaking, contributing significantly to both Urdu literature and early Pakistani cinema.

Throughout his multifaceted career, he made significant contributions to literature and cinema, spanning British India and post-partition Pakistan. For example, his first film in Pakistan Chiragh Jalta Raha (1962) helped boost careers of Zeba, Mohammad Ali and Deeba in the Pakistani film industry.

== Early life and education ==
Fazal Ahmad Karim Fazli was born on 5 November 1906, in Azamgarh, in what was then the United Provinces of British India. He completed his early education in Allahabad before traveling to England for higher studies at Oxford University. It was during his training for the Indian Civil Service (ICS) in England that he developed a keen interest in cinema, particularly the introduction of sound in films. He recognized the immense potential of film as a medium to convey messages to the masses, a passion that would later drive his filmmaking career.

== Career ==
After finishing his studies in England, upon his return to India, Fazli joined the Indian Civil Service and was appointed to various significant governmental roles in Bengal. Fazli's passion for cinema, cultivated during his time in England, led him to become a pioneer in the film industries of both pre-partition British India and post-partition Pakistan.

Fazli wrote extensively in Urdu under the pen name "Fazli," leaving behind a legacy of both poetry and prose. He published his poetry collections include Naghma-e-Zindagi (1941).

He was inspired by his older brothers, including S.F. Hasnain and Sibtain Fazli, to enter the film industry. The Fazli brothers' 1938 film Qaidi, which was released in 1940, is credited with pioneering the "Muslim Social" genre in undivided India. He later co-founded Fazli Brothers Ltd. in 1940. Fazal Ahmad Karim Fazli also wrote the story for the 1942 film Masoom.

Following the partition of India in 1947, Fazli migrated to the newly formed state of Pakistan and continued his public service career. His notable roles included serving as Secretary for the Education Department in East Pakistan and as Secretary for the Ministry of Kashmir Affairs. In 1951, Fazli was invited by the U.S. government to deliver a series of guest lectures at American universities. His civil service career concluded when he was "forcefully retired" in 1959, an event that led him to pursue filmmaking full-time.

He continued writing under his pen name "Fazli" and wrote Chashm-e-Ghazaal (1953). After his retirement from civil service, he established his own production company, Dabistan Mehdood, in 1959. His most notable film was Chiragh Jalta Raha (1962), which he produced, wrote, and directed.

He hired famous singers Iqbal Bano, Kajjan Begum, Madam Noor Jehan, M. Kaleem, Shabana. Indian playback singer Talat Mahmood was convinced by Fazli to sing three songs during his visit to Karachi to sing songs in his film Chiragh Jalta Raha. The music was composed by Nihal Abdullah and included a famous folk wedding song originally written by the poet Amir Khusrau. The soundtrack, which included 14 songs in total, featured lyrics drawn from the poetry of literary figures such as Mirza Ghalib, Mir Taqi Mir, Jigar Moradabadi, Mahir ul Qadri and Amir Khusro, with Fazli also contributing to the lyrics.

The film was an adaptation of Oliver Goldsmith's The Vicar of Wakefield and is notable for introducing several new talents, including actors Zeba, Deeba and Mohammad Ali. It premiered with Fatima Jinnah as the chief guest and won him a Nigar Award for best scriptwriter.

He also produced, wrote, and directed Aisa Bhi Hota Hai (1965) and Waqt Ki Pukar (1967). His ghazals are characterized by a blend of classical style and modernist sensibility. He is also the author of the novels Khoon-e-Jigar Hone Tak and Sehar Hone Tak. His book Pakistani Saqafat Wa Wataniyyat Ke Chand Pahlu, which addressed national and patriotic issues, was published in 1970.

== Personal life ==
Fazal Ahmad Karim Fazli was known for his warmth and was affectionately called "Chacha Abba" by his family and close associates. He was part of a large family with several siblings who were also involved in the film industry. His son, Saeed Karim Fazli, followed in his footsteps as a film director and his grandson, Umair S. Fazli, has also contributed to cinema.

== Death ==
Fazal Ahmad Karim Fazli died on December 17, 1981, in Karachi, Pakistan, at the age of 75.

== Filmography ==
=== as a cinematographer ===
Year	Film	Language	Ref.
1940	Qaidi	Hindi	
1942	Masoom	Hindi	
1967	Waqt Ki Pukar	Urdu	

=== as a director ===
Year	Film	Language	Ref.
1940	Qaidi	Hindi	
1962	Chiragh Jalta Raha	Urdu	
1965	Aisa Bhi Hota Hai	Urdu	

=== as a producer ===
Year	Film	Language	Ref.
1940	Qaidi	Hindi	
1962	Chiragh Jalta Raha	Urdu	
1965	Aisa Bhi Hota Hai	Urdu	
1967	Waqt Ki Pukar	Urdu	

== Legacy ==
Fazli's work in film focused on patriotic and social themes, prioritizing meaningful content. Along with his brothers, Fazli is credited with pioneering the "Muslim Social" genre in pre-partition Indian cinema with the film Qaidi (1938). This genre focused on social issues within Muslim families, and Fazli himself contributed the story for the brothers' subsequent film, Masoom (1942).

His 1962 film Chiragh Jalta Raha is particularly remembered for introducing several actors who would become legends in Pakistani cinema, including Zeba, Mohammad Ali, Deeba, Kemal Irani and Talat Hussain. The film's premiere was even attended by Fatima Jinnah, signaling its cultural importance.

== Awards and recognition ==
Year	Award	Category	Result	Title	Ref.
1962	Nigar Award	Best Script Writer	Won	Chiragh Jalta Raha	
