= Baghi Sipahi (1986 film) =

1986 film

Baghi Sipahi باغی سپاہی
- Directed by: Fiaz Sheikh; Khawaja Zubirwahi
- Screenplay by: Aftab Jeida
- Story by: Tanwir Kazmi
- Produced by: Fiaz Sheikh
- Starring: Sultan Rahi; Mumtaz; Mustafa Qureshi; Aasia; Talish; Sawan; Iqbal Hassan; Allauddin; Ilyas Kashmiri; Afzaal Ahmed; Diljeet Mirza; Seema
- Cinematography: Mian Javed
- Edited by: Mian Rafiq
- Music by: Master Abdullah
- Production companies: Lahore Color Laboratory; Bari Studio
- Distributed by: Riaz Shahid Brothers
- Release date: 19 February 1986
- Running time: 131 minutes
- Country: Pakistan
- Language: Punjabi

Baghi Sipahi (Punjabi: باغی سپاہی, lit. 'Rebel soldier') is a 1986 Pakistani action and musical film directed and produced by Fiaz Sheikh. The film stars actors Sultan Rahi, Mumtaz, Mustafa Qureshi, Aasia and Afzaal Ahmed.

== Cast ==
- Sultan Rahi as (Sultan)
- Mumtaz as Bali
- Mustafa Qureshi as Sher Singh
- Aasia as Pareeto
- Talish
- Sawan
- Iqbal Hassan
- Allauddin
- Ilyas Kashmiri
- Afzaal Ahmed
- Diljeet Mirza
- Seema

== Soundtrack ==
The music of Baghi Sipahi is composed by Master Abdullah with lyrics penned by Khawaja Pervez Aalam Bin Muslim, Mehmood Shahid.

Baghi Sipahi

Soundtrack album by Master Abdullah
- Released: February 14, 1986
- Recorded: 1986
- Genre: Film soundtrack
- Length: 22:41
- Language: Punjabi
- Label: Famous Musical
- Director: Fiaz Sheikh
- Producer: Fiaz Sheikh
- Compiler: Khawaja Pervez

Khawaja Pervez chronology
Ik Madari (1973)	Baghi Sipahi (1986)	Riaz Gujjar (1991)

Baghi Sipahi Album: Track listing
No.	Title	Singer(s)	Length
1.	"Sarkar Hussan Di Ayi"	Noor Jehan & Mehnaz	4:35
2.	"Ve Aj Dhooman Payian"	Noor Jehan	3:34
3.	"Mera Kuj Lagda"	Naheed Akhtar	5:12
4.	"Gall Sun Chaina, Raj Liya Apna"	Hassan Sadiq & Masood Rana	4:51
5.	"Jo Bole Sonehal Sohanya"	Mehnaz	4:34
