= Chiragh Jalta Raha =

Pakistani Urdu-language film

- Film poster
- چراغ جلتا رہا
- Directed by: Fazal Ahmad Karim Fazli
- Story by: Fazal Ahmad Karim Fazli
- Produced by: Fazal Ahmad Karim Fazli
- Starring: Zeba; Arif; Deeba; Muhammad Ali; Talat Hussain; Waheed Mehmood; Kemal Irani; Naeema Garaj
- Cinematography: Sawak Mistry
- Music by: Nihal Abdulah
- Production company: Dabistan Mehdood
- Release date: 9 March 1962
- Country: Pakistan
- Language: Urdu

Chiragh Jalta Raha is a 1962 Pakistani Urdu film produced and directed by Fazal Ahmad Karim Fazli. The film introduced Zeba, Deeba, Muhammad Ali, Talat Hussain, and Kemal Irani. Fatima Jinnah, the sister of Pakistan's founder Muhammad Ali Jinnah, opened the film's premiere in March 1962. Chiragh Jalta Raha won a Nigar Award in the best script writer category.

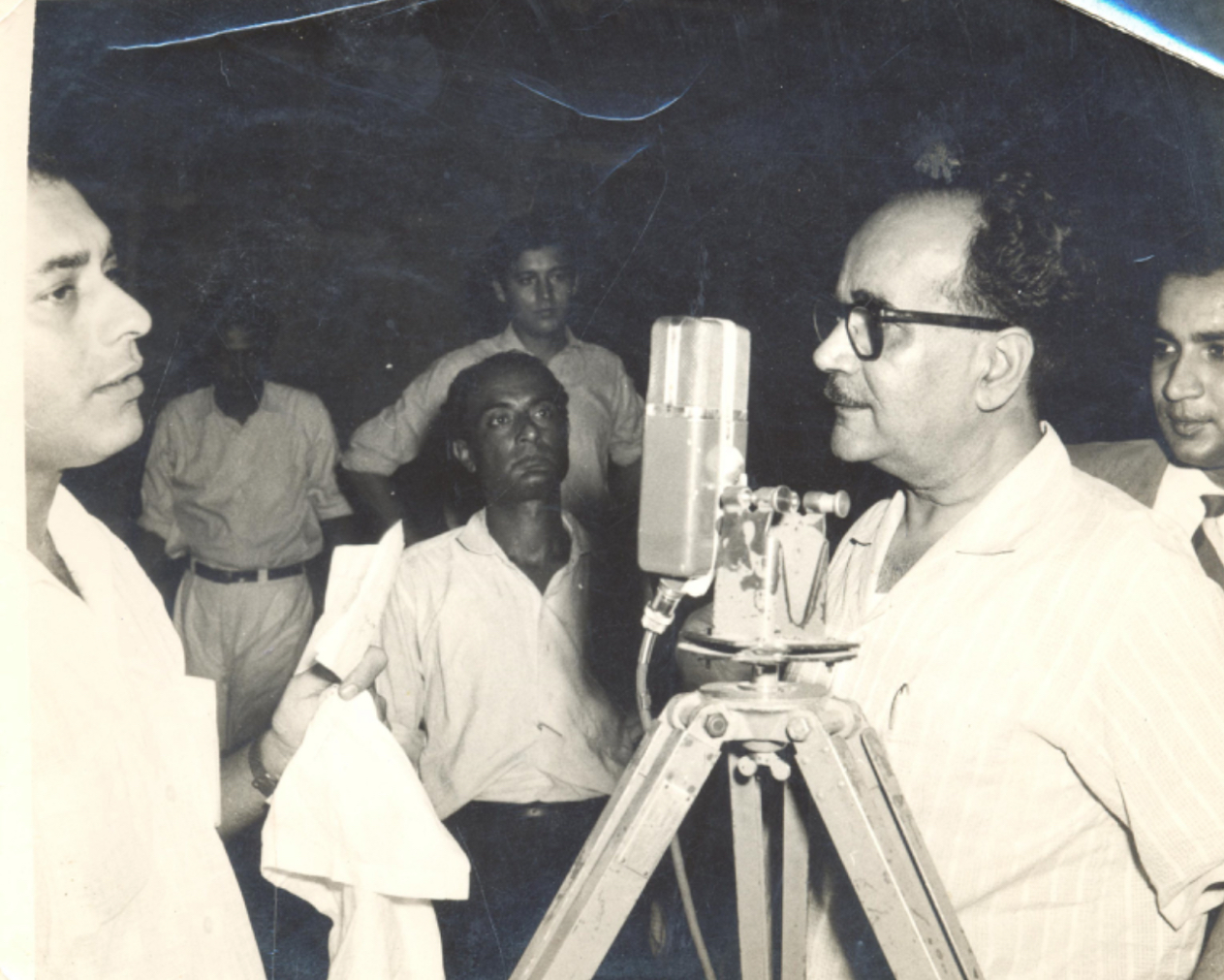
Fazal Ahmad Karim Fazli

== Plot ==
The central theme of the movie revolves around how politicians abuse the system. Shakir is a principled and virtuous school headteacher in his town. A selfish and greedy politician of the same town, who is also a Nawab, wants to marry his daughter Jamila (Zeba) to Shakir's son Jameel so that he could use Shakir's honor and good name for their political purposes. Jamila and Jamal's relationship is settled, but Nawab Sahib does not agree with Shakir's principledness. Shakir sends his son Jameel to Karachi and moves to another village with his daughter Saba and son Munna. He pretends to be Ayaz, allowing him to experience the pain and suffering of the people. No one knows that it is Nawab Mahmood. Afsar Khan, the lustful younger brother of the same Nawab, casts his eye on Shakir's daughter Saba. Shakir's Begum is a greedy woman, who is under the spell of Afsar Khan. Shaker opposes the marriage of Saba and Afsar Khan. Afsar Khan's brother also forbids Begum from this marriage, but she does not agree and blocks his entry into her house. One day Afsar Khan plans to kidnap Saba through his colleague Luqman.

After his daughter's kidnapping, Shakir goes to Karachi, to his son Jameel, where he meets the publisher of his book, Nabi Ahmed. Jameel is also present there. Afsar Khan also comes to his house as a guest of the same publisher. Seeing Jameela, he thinks of making her his wife, but when he finds out that she wants Jameel, Afsar Khan sends Jameel to Dhaka to get him a job, so that he can marry Jameela. Shakir heads back to his town, where he meets his daughter Saba at the station, who tells him that Afsar Khan has ruined his honor by pretending to marry. He goes to Afsar Khan and warns him to accept Saba as his wife, or else he will have to face the court. After hearing this, Afsar Khan jails Shakir with his relations. When Jameel realises the whole situation, he goes to the village to kill Afsar Khan, but is arrested by the police. Father and son meet in prison. Jameel and Shakir are respected by all the prisoners because of their good character. One day Afsar Khan's colleague Luqman falls into the hands of the police, who during the investigation uncovers all the atrocities of Afsar Khan. Nawab Mahmood hands over his brother Afsar Khan to the police and all the others join together.

Jamil and Jamila marry. Shakir's book is also published in England, for which he receives 50 thousand as royalty. So Shakir's suffering ends.

== Cast ==
- Zeba as Jameela
- Arif as Jameel
- Deeba as Saba
- Muhammad Ali as Afsar Khan
- Talat Hussain as Munna
- Waheed Mehmood as Shakir
- Kemal Irani as Nawab of the town
- Naeema Garaj as Choti
- Safia Moini
- Ameer Khan
- Mughal Basher Ahmed Khan
- Roma
- Dady
- Prinsses Amina

== Music ==
The film's music was composed by Nihal Abdulah. The lyrics were taken from the poetry of Mirza Ghalib, Mir Taqi Mir, Jigar Moradabadi, Mahir ul Qadri, Ameer Khusro, and Fazal Ahmad Karim Fazli. Among the playback singers were Iqbal Bano, Noor Jehan, Kajjan Begum, M. Kaleem, and Shabana. The Indian playback singer Talat Mehmood also vocalized 3 songs for the film. Mehmood sung "Kuch hua hasil na ab tak" and "Mushkil nikla dil ka sambhalna" for the film.

== Release and box office ==
Chiragh Jalta Raha was released on 9 March 1962. It was premiered by Fatima Jinnah, who was the chief guest in the opening ceremony held at Nishat cinema, Karachi. The film received positive reviews from the critics and was crowned as a silver jubilee hit.

== Legacy ==
It was listed among a few films such as Jago Hua Savera, Aur Bhi Gham Hain and Humsafar, all of which deal with some themes in a purposeful manner. In 2017, it was included among the unforgettable and daring Pakistani films in an article by Daily Times.

=== Historical significance for Pakistani cinema ===
Chiragh Jalta Raha gave Pakistani cinema multiple stars who would dominate Lollywood for decades to follow. Chiragh Jalta Raha launched the careers of Zeba and Muhammad Ali who later not only became a popular screen couple but partners in real life as well. The film allowed Deeba, who had entered the film industry as a child artist, to play a woman for the first time. The film's hero Arif did not benefit from the movie and disappeared right after. It was also the debut movie of actors Kemal Irani and Talat Hussain.

== Awards ==
Year	Award	Category	Result	Awardee	Ref.
1962	Nigar Awards	Best Script Writer	Won	Fazal Ahmad Karim Fazli	
1962	Nigar Awards	Best Supporting Actress	Won	Zeba	
