= Rangeela (1970 film) =

1970 film

- رنگیلا
- Directed by: Rangeela
- Screenplay by: Bashir Niaz
- Story by: Rangeela
- Produced by: Rangeela
- Starring: Nisho; Rangeela; Aqeel; Saiqa; Salma Mumtaz; Munawar Zarif
- Cinematography: Rasheed Kardar, Ikaram Shah, Gorden Clark
- Music by: Kamal Ahmed and Nazir Ali
- Production company: Rangeela Productions
- Release date: 18 September 1970
- Country: Pakistan
- Language: Urdu

Rangeela is a 1970 Pakistani Urdu romantic comedy film directed and produced by Rangeela. The lead cast included Nisho, Rangeela, Aqeel, Saiqa, Salma Mumtaz, and Munawar Zarif.

The film won a Nigar Award in the best script writer category. A song from the film "We Sab To Sohniya" (vocalized by Tasawar Khanum) became the highlight of the movie and is still considered an iconic melody. As a director, it was Rangeela's second movie after "Diya Aur Toofan" (1969).

== Cast ==
- Nisho
- Rangeela
- Aqeel
- Saiqa
- Salma Mumtaz
- Munawar Zarif
- Sultan Rahi
- Meena Chodhary
- Zarqa
- Najmul Hassan
- Mazhar Shah
- Ilyas Kashmiri
- M.D. Sheikh
- Jaggi Malik
- Munir Zarif
- Rasheed Zarif
- Chhabeela
- Nanha

== Music and soundtracks ==
The film's music was composed by Kamal Ahmed and only one film song was composed by Nazir Ali. Lyrics were penned by Waris Ludhianvi, Fayyaz Hashmi, Khawaja Pervaiz, and Kemal Ahmad:

- Array Tu Hay Bara Nadan, O Sajna... Singer(s): Irene Parveen, Music: Kamal Ahmed, Poet: Kemal Ahmad
- Chheir Koi Sargam O'Raagi, Taan Maar Kay Pathar Torr Dun... Singers: Rangeela, Munawar Zarif, Music: Kemal Ahmad, Poet: Kemal Ahmad
- Ham Nay Jo Dekhay Khawab Suhanay, Aaj Un Ki Tabeer Mili... Singer: Rangeela, Music: Kemal Ahmad, Poet: Kemal Ahmad
- Jhalki Dikhlay Kay Dil Lay Liya, Bijli Gira Kay Dil Lay Liya... Singer: Ahmad Rushdi, Music: Kemal Ahmad, Poet: Fayyaz Hashmi
- Kis Nay Tora Hay Dil Hazoor Ka, Kis Nay Thukraya Tera Pyar... Singer: Mala, Music: Kemal Ahmad, Poet: Khawaja Pervaiz
- Way Sab Tun Sohneya, Hehe Way Mann Mohnya (sad)... Singers: Tasawar Khanum & others, Music: Nazir Ali, Poet: Khawaja Pervaiz
- Way Sab Tun Sohneya, Hehe Way Mann Mohnya, Main Teri Ho Geyi... Singers: Tasawur Khanum and others, Music: Nazir Ali, Poet: Khawaja Pervaiz

== Release and box office ==
Rangeela was released on 18 September 1970. The film was a golden jubilee hit in Pakistan.

== Awards ==
Year	Film	Award	Category	Awardee	Ref.
1970	Rangeela	Nigar Award	Best script writer	Rangeela	
