= Zabata =

- Directed by: Jahangir Mughal
- Written by: Abdullah
- Screenplay by: Pervaiz Kaleem
- Produced by: Haji Ahsan Ali; Rafique Ahmed Minhas
- Starring: Babra Sharif; Sultan Rahi; Jahanzeb; Jehangir Mughal; Asif Khan; Naimat Sarhadi; Zahir Shah; Albela; Shafqat Cheema; Talish; Humayun Qureshi; Naghma; Hassan Murad
- Narrated by: Al-Hajj Sultan Rahi
- Cinematography: Iqbal Nimmi
- Edited by: Ashiq Ali Hujra; Qurban
- Music by: Wajahat Attre
- Production company: Evernew Pictures (Karachi)
- Distributed by: Khudadad Production
- Release date: 3 September 1993 (Pakistan)
- Running time: 155 minutes
- Country: Pakistan
- Languages: Urdu/Punjabi, Double version

Zabata (transl. The Code) is a 1993 Pakistani action film, directed by Jahangir Mughal and produced by Haji Ahsan Ali. The film stars Sultan Rahi, Babra Sharif, Zahir Shah, Albela, Shafqat Cheema and Humayun Qureshi.

== Cast ==
- Babra Sharif
- Sultan Rahi
- Jahanzeb
- Jehangir Mughal
- Asif Khan
- Naimat Sarhadi
- Zahir Shah
- Albela|Shafqat Cheema
- Talish
- Humayun Qureshi
- Naghma
- Hassan Murad
