= Baharo Phool Barsao =

1972 Pakistani film

- Theatrical release poster
- Urdu: بہارو پُھول برساؤ
- Directed by: M. Sadiq; Hassan Tariq
- Written by: M. Sadiq
- Produced by: M. Sadiq
- Starring: Rani; Waheed Murad; Rukhsana; Aslam Pervaiz; Ilyas Kashmiri; Saiqa; Kamal Irani; Munawar Zarif; Sangeeta
- Edited by: Ali
- Music by: Nashad
- Release date: 11 August 1972
- Running time: approx. 3 hours
- Country: Pakistan
- Language: Urdu

Baharo Phool Barsao (transl. Shower Flowers O Spring), is a 1972 Pakistani Urdu-language romance film produced and directed by M. Sadiq. He migrated from India and began the production and direction of this film, but died halfway through its production. It was later completed by Hassan Tariq.

It cast Waheed Murad, Rani, Rukhsana, Munawar Zarif as leads with Aslam Pervaiz, Saiqa, Kamal Irani, Tamanna, Ilyas Kashmiri in supporting roles and Sangeeta in a guest appearance. The film is based on India's Lucknow culture.

== Plot ==
The film begins with Nawab Parvez Akhter, a spendthrift nawab from Lucknow, drowning in debt due to his extravagant spending in mushaira and other events. His estate gradually becomes mortgaged to moneylenders and merchants. Meanwhile, his cousin, Nawab Fakhru, plots against him, wanting to see Parvez ruined. Parvez falls in love with Salma, daughter of another Nawab, and marries her. After the marriage, Salma discovers the dire situation of Parvez's household and learns about a condition left by their grandfather: if Parvez and Salma have a son within five years, they will inherit six villages, but if they fail, the property will be transferred to Fakhru.

As Salma and Parvez are unable to have a child, Fakhru sends an old woman as a spy to their house to gather information. When Fakhru learns about the condition, he plans to sabotage Parvez. Desperate to save the estate, Salma makes a drastic decision. She goes to river with her friends and commits suicide there by jumping into a river. Parvez is devastated but refuses to accept her death and sets out to find her, eventually jumping into the same river.

However, Parvez survives and searches for Salma. Two years later, he finds a child with a family mark on its hand and believes it might be his son. Salma, who has lost her memory and is living with a Banjara tribe as Shehzadi, sees the child and becomes enraged, taking it away. Parvez follows her and eventually finds her, but she doesn't remember him. He informs his faithful servant, Mir Saheb, about his situation through a letter, but Fakhru learns about this and goes there following the address to harm Parvez. However, Mir Saheb gathers Parvez's friends and follows them. Salma's memory returns when she sees Fakhru trying to harm Parvez. With the help of Parvez's friends, Fakhru and his henchmen are defeated, and he is arrested. Parvez and Salma are reunited, and Parvez inherits his grandfather's property.

== Cast ==
- Rani as Salma
- Waheed Murad as Nawab Parvez Akhter
- Rukhsana
- Aslam Pervaiz as Nawab Fakhru
- Ilyas Kashmiri as Shabbo Pehalwaan
- Saiqa as Yasmeen
- Kamal Irani
- Munawar Zarif as Mirza
- Sangeeta (Special appearance)

== Reception ==
The film was released by Sadiq Productions on 11 August 1972 in Pakistani cinemas. The film completed 23 weeks on main cinema and 64 weeks on other cinemas of Karachi and thus became a blockbuster Golden Jubilee film of the year. The film was again released in 1983, after Waheed Murad's death, in Lahore's cinemas and it again celebrated Golden Jubilee in its second run.

== Music ==
The music of the film is composed by Nashad and the songs are written by Shewan Rizvi. Playback singers are Masood Rana, Noor Jehan, Ahmad Rushdi, Mala, Tassawar Khanum, Irene Perveen, and Shaukat Ali. The songs of the film became very popular esp. Mere dil ki hai awaz..., Yeh ghar mera gulshan hai... and Chanda re chanda.... A list of the songs of the film is as follows:

- Mere dil ki hai awaz... by Masood Rana
- Yeh ghar mera gulshan hai, Gulshan ka Khuda hafiz.. by Noor Jehan
- Chanda re chanda... by Noor Jehan
- Aye mohabbat tera jawab nahin... by Shaukat Ali, Irene Perveen and Tassawar Khanum
- Aye parda-nasheen... by Tassawar Khanum and Mala
- Meri jaan yaar badsha... by Ahmed Rushdi and Tassawar Khanum

== Awards ==
Baharo Phool Barsao won 4 Nigar Awards in the following categories:

Category	Recipient
Best film	M. Sadiq and Hassan Tariq
Best script writer	M. Sadiq
Best lyricist	Shevan Rizvi
Best comedian	Munawar Zarif
