= Sargent (film) =

Pakistani action thriller film

- سارجنٹ
- Directed by: Aslam Irani
- Screenplay by: Mohammad Kemal Pasha
- Produced by: Mian Javed Qamar
- Starring: Najma; Asif Khan; Mustafa Qureshi; Afzal Ahmed; Saiqa
- Cinematography: Sajjad Rizvi
- Music by: Kamal Ahmed
- Production company: Babar Pictures
- Release date: 4 August 1977
- Country: Pakistan
- Language: Urdu

Sargent is a 1977 Pakistani Urdu language action thriller film directed by Aslam Irani. The cast includes Asif Khan, Najma, and Mustafa Qureshi.

== Plot ==
The story of Sargent (Sergeant translated in English) is about a brave and honest police officer Farid, who puts his life on the line against criminals and smugglers. The other main character is Dilawar, a young man who is misguided by society and turns into a criminal. Dilawar is oppressed, but when the oppression increases, he ends the oppressor. The third character is Shabnam, a woman whose husband gets killed in an accident and people rob her of her dignity.

== Cast ==
The film cast includes:

- Najma
- Asif Khan
- Mustafa Qureshi
- Saiqa
- Adeeb
- Afzaal Ahmad
- Bahar Begum
- Saqi
- Seema
- Nanha
- Kemal Irani
- Abid Butt
- Akhtar Shad
- Afshan
- Majeed Zarif
- Saleem Hassan
- Abid Kashmiri
- (Guest appearances: Yasmin Khan, Aurangzeb)

== Music and soundtracks ==
The music of Sargent was composed by Kamal Ahmed and film songs lyrics were written by Tasleem Fazli:

- Ja Re Sargent Ho Ja Re Sargent... Singer Noor Jehan
- Hay Noukari Jo Pyari To Phir Yaari Chhorr De... Singer(s): Noor Jehan
- Kyun Sharabi Sharab Peeta Hay Aur Phir BeHisab Peeta Hay... Singer(s): Mehdi Hassan
- Raat, Ho Geya Sanata, Dil Mein Chubnay Laga Kanta... Singer(s): Noor Jahan
- Zara Dekh Idhar Meri Ankhon Ka Rang Neela Bhi Hay Kala Bhi... Singer(s): Noor Jahan

== Release and box office ==
Sargent was released on 4 August 1977. It was a golden jubilee box office hit.
