= Ottachilambu =

- Genre: Horror TV series
- Written by: Rajesh puthanpurayil
- Story by: Rajesh Puthanpurayil
- Directed by: Binu Vellathooval/Sujith sunder
- Country of origin: India
- Original language: Malayalam
- No. of seasons: 1
- No. of episodes: 159

Production
- Producers: Prakash Menon; M. C. Arun
- Production locations: Piravom - Paduthol Mana Adimaly, Kerala
- Cinematography: Anpu Mani
- Editor: Ranju
- Production company: Line of Colours P.M.Productions

Original release
- Network: Mazhavil Manorama
- Release: 24 October 2016 – 2 June 2017

Related
- Karnan

Ottachilambu (ml; ഒറ്റച്ചിലമ്പ്‌) is an Indian horror television series in Malayalam Language launched on Mazhavil Manorama channel on 24 October 2016 .It aired from Monday to Friday at 08:30 .P.M.

== Synopsis ==
A 6-year child is born "Devooty" who is born in same star sign and date of the mesmerising beauty called "Syamandakam"; who incubates into the body of the child. Syamandakam was burnt alive in the historically old ‘Eloor’ palace. Syamandakam takes a revenge note through Devooty to those who killed her & her family. In the process she falls in love with a young guy Adikeshavan; who helps her to take the revenge. The story puts light at the core to the aspirations and ambitions of those who die before fulfilling their lives

== Plot ==
Ambika (Manju Satheesh) is a charming, lovely girl from Eloor kovilakam, her parents died years back and she lives with her aunt and uncle who are thampuran and thampuratti (Urmila) of Kovilakam. She has a liking towards her Malayalam teacher Andrews (Anand) and they plan to leave the town and marry. After years they have a daughter (Manjadi), they live in Adivaram In a rental house. They plan to buy a new house after which Ambika plans to go and meet her aunty, she is pregnant but unfortunately both dies in a bike accident. Devooty is all alone, is admitted in a hospital due to pneumonia, their neighbors who took her to hospital refuse to pay money for her operation. Kiran who is devooty's friend stole money from temple for this purpose and is caught by police .Deva goes back home and see that the owner has locked the house, she takes her bag and leave the city to Kodungaloor to meet Thampuratti. Fortunately she meets Swami in a bus to ernakulam and tell her story. He takes her with him promising to take her to the kovilakam, she became favorite of everyone in the temple where the swami took her.

Meanwhile, Adhikeshavan comes to stay in Chavadi and opens the room even after Chinmaya's restriction (where Syamanakam is lies) .He talks to the spirit and understands her feeling. Arundhati(Sarika) and Ravi(Rajeev) and all other family members reunite in the kovilakam for the partition of properties which Thampuratti restricts. Thampurayti on her visit to temple with Chinmayi and Adiyodi meets Devooty and identity who she is and takes her to kovilakam as Adhi's daughter Syamadakam takes her real form to take revenge.

== Production ==
The promos of the series was already telecast-ed through channels official YouTube page and through the television. This show replaced on-air series titled Ponnambili .

Casting

Malayalam actress Nithya Das signed into play lead role which marked her come back to Malayalam industry after 5 years. She has done a few television serials before and currently she is doing a Tamil serial too. Urmila Unni also plays a pivotal role in the series, it is the first time she is doing a role a thampuratty.

Popular TV actors Rajeev Parameshwar and Harishanth plays the male leads. Harishanth who was last seen in Ente Penn 2014 TV series is playing a strong character named Aadhikeshavan, who investigates in ghosts. Newcomer - Child artist Manjadi plays one of the lead roles in this series.

== Cast ==
Actor	Role	Character sketch
Nithya Das	Symandakam / Seemanthini	Lakshmi-Ravindra Varma's illegitimate daughter / Ghost
Baby Manjadi Joby	Devashilpa a.k.a. Devootty	Ambika-Andrews daughter
Sharran Puthumana	Adhikeshavan	Resident at Chavady
Urmila Unni	Umayamma thamburatty	Queen of Eloor Kovilakam
Angel Mariya Joseph	Dr.Chinmaya Pisharody	Adv.Pisharody's daughter
Rajeev Parameshwaran	Ravindra Varma(Ravi)	Thampuratti's son /Syamandakam's father
Sharika Menon	Arundhathi	Ravi's wife
Sajitha Betti	Anna Rose	Andrew's sister
Shameem Poovath	Mahadeva Varma(Devan/Mani)	Thampuratti's son in law
Ram mohan	Dharma deva Varma	Elayachan
Ardra Das/Anshitha	Sandhya	Thampurati's younger daughter
Sethu Lakshmi	Sudharma Mahadevan	Thampuratti's daughter
Anand Narayan	Sidharth(Sidhu)	Sandhya's lover
Thirumala Ramachandran	Adiyodi	Karyasthan
Varsha Abhay	Lalitha	Mahadevan's second wife
Roslin	Devamma (Paatti)	Kaveri's care taker
Vyjayanthi	Sreelakshmi	Bhagavathar Thirumanass's daughter/Ravindra varma's lover /Syamandakam's mother
Ann Mariya	Sarada	Servant of eloor kovilakam
Manju Satheesh	Ambika	Eloor Thamburan's niece
Anand Kumar	Andrews	Ambika's professor /Husband
Deepika Mohan	Chinnamma	House owner
Parameshwaran Kurithy	Swami	Swami who saves Devootty
Mini Sreekumar	Principal	Kovilakam school in charge
Hashim Malayil	Amoorthan	Durmanthravadi
Master Kiran	Kiran	Devutty's friend
Devan	Vasudevan Bhagavathar	Raveendran's music teacher
Vanchiyoor Praveen Kumar	Adv Sadashiva Pisharady	Family consultant of Eloor kovilakam
Daveed John	Doctor	At the hospital where devooty was admitted
Baby Vedika	Kalyani	Devooty's friend
Kalamandalam Sheena	Vimala teacher	Devooty's class teacher
Arun Hirosh C.S	inspector	Policemen in Kodungalloor police station
Sajan Kalady	inspector	Policemen in Kodungalloor police station
