= Saiqa (actress) =

Pakistani actress

- Born: Saiqa Akhtar; 8 September 1958 (age 66); Lahore, Pakistan
- Education: University of Lahore
- Occupation: Actress
- Years active: 1967–present
- Spouse: Khayyam Sarhadi (m. 1981; died 2011) (husband)
- Children: 3
- Relatives: Zia Sarhadi (father-in-law); Zahira Ghaznavi (mother-in-law); Zhalay Sarhadi (niece)

Saiqa Akhtar, also known as Saiqa (Urdu: سائقہ) is a Pakistani actress. She acted in both Urdu and Punjabi films and is known for her roles in the films Baharo Phool Barsao, Mela, Ranga Daku, Jahan Tum Wahan Hum, Ghulami, Angara, and Chambaili.

== Early life ==
Saiqa was born on 8 September 1958 in Lahore, Pakistan. She completed her studies from University of Lahore.

== Career ==
Saiqa Akhtar made her debut as an actress in 1967 in Urdu film Hamraz. She worked in Lollywood films. She appeared in films Jeera Blade, Taxi Driver, Rangeela, Dil Aur Duniya, Dard, Dhian Nimanian and Meri Zindagi Hay Naghma. She later dropped her surname for her acting credits, and appeared as Saiqa in films Tera Gham Rahay Salamat, Parda Na Uthao, Pyar Ka Mousam, Teray Meray Sapnay and Aj Diyan Kurrian. She later appeared in films Heera Tay Basheera, Aas Paas, Aap Say Kya Parda, Aag Ka Samundar, Aakhri Nakha and Mera Insaf. In 1970 she starred in the film Rangeela with Munawar Zarif, Rangeela and Sultan Rahi the film was a hit and she won Nigar Award of Best Supporting Actress. Saiqa then stopped working in films after the decline of Pakistan Film Industry. Saiqa then started to work in dramas and appeared in dramas Laa, Raiq Zar, Bol Kaffara and Teri Rah Mein.

== Personal life ==
Saiqa married film and television actor Khayyam Sarhadi and they had three children together. Saiqa's father-in-law Zia Sarhadi was a screenwriter and her niece Zhalay Sarhadi is a model. Saiqa husband Khayyam Sarhadi died in 2011.

== Filmography ==
=== Television ===
Year	Title	Role	Network
1990	Raig Zar	Sukho	PTV
1991	Rohi Dhoop Jali	Zubaida	PTV
1993	Udeek	Reshma	PTV
1994	Manchalay Ka Sauda	Shabana	PTV
1994	Alao	Suhani Begum	PTV
1995	Kahani Ghar	Safia	PTV
2010	Rut Rangeeldi	Bakhtan	PTV
2012	Kaali	Noman's mother	PTV
2012	The Shareef Show Mubarak Ho	Herself	Geo Entertainment
2014	Tum Mere Hi Rehna	Zarqa	Hum TV
2014	Laa	Zareena	Hum TV
2018	Bol Kaffara	Zohra	BOL Entertainment
2022	Teri Rah Mein	Emaan's mother	ARY Digital

=== Telefilm ===
Year	Title	Role
1996	Khirman	Sakeena

=== Film ===
Year	Film	Language
1967	Hamraz	Urdu
1968	Jahan Tum Wahan Hum	Urdu
1968	Sangdil	Urdu
1968	Bau Ji	Punjabi
1969	Dard	Urdu
1970	Taxi Driver	Punjabi
1970	Rangeela	Urdu
1971	Dil Aur Duniya	Urdu
1971	Banda Bashar	Punjabi
1972	Heera Moti	Punjabi
1972	Mohabbat	Urdu
1972	Baharo Phool Barsao	Urdu
1972	Meri Zindagi Hay Naghma	Urdu
1972	2 Rangeelay	Punjabi
1973	Aas	Urdu
1973	Dhian Nimanian	Siraiki
1973	Parday Mein Rehnay Do	Urdu
1973	Rangeela Aur Munawar Zarif	Urdu
1973	Jeera Blade	Punjabi
1973	Tera Gham Rahay Salamat	Urdu
1974	Samaj	Urdu
1974	Parda Na Uthao	Urdu
1974	Sidha Rasta	Punjabi
1974	Bahisht	Urdu
1975	Pyar Ka Mousam	Urdu
1975	Jogi	Punjabi
1975	Teray Meray Sapnay	Urdu
1975	Noukar	Urdu
1976	Toofan	Punjabi
1976	Sachai	Urdu
1977	3 Badshah	Punjabi
1977	Sargent	Urdu
1977	Aj Diyan Kurrian	Punjabi
1978	Heera Tay Basheera	Punjabi
1978	Ranga Daku	Punjabi
1979	Aap Say Kya Parda	Urdu
1979	Jatt Soorma	Punjabi
1980	Ham Dono	Urdu
1981	Aakhri Nakha	Pashto
1982	Aas Paas	Urdu
1983	Sra Lumba	Pashto
1984	Bala Gaadi	Punjabi
1984	Aag Ka Samundar	Urdu
1985	Ghulami	Punjabi
1985	Sher Dil Khan	Pashto
1985	Angara	Punjabi
1986	Joora	Punjabi
1986	Mela	Punjabi
1987	Ik Si Daku	Punjabi
1987	Mera Insaf	Urdu
1988	Roti	Punjabi
1989	Farar	Pashto
1989	Khuda Bakhsh	Punjabi
1989	Lalu	Punjabi
1991	Nigahen	Punjabi, Urdu
1992	Naela	Punjabi, Urdu
1992	Fateh	Punjabi, Urdu
1992	Supra	Punjabi
1994	Malang Bacha	Pashto
1994	Anokha Pyar	Urdu
1995	Gandageer	Pashto
1995	Chohdary Badshah	Punjabi
2013	Chambaili	Urdu
2019	Kaaf Kangana	Urdu

== Awards and recognition ==
Year	Award	Category	Result	Title	Ref.
1970	Nigar Award	Best Supporting Actress	Won	Rangeela	
