= Jahanzeb (actor) =

Pakistani actor (born 1966)

- جہانزیب
- Born: Jahanzeb Khan; 20 March 1966 (age 60); Karachi, Sindh, Pakistan
- Occupations: Actor; Model
- Years active: 1986 – 2010
- Spouse: Farah Jahanzeb (m. 1989; died 2014)
- Children: 2

Jahanzeb Khan, also known as Jahanzeb (Urdu: جہانزیب) is a Pakistani actor and model. He has acted in both Urdu and Punjabi films and is known for his roles in the films Choron Ki Barat, Maa Bani Dulhan, Elaan-e-Jang, Taqat Ka Toofan, Choron Ka Badshah, Haseena 420, Bazar-e-Husn and Jungli Mera Naam. He was noted for his resemblance to former cricketer Imran Khan.

== Early life ==
Jahanzeb was born in Karachi, Pakistan. He belonged to an Agha Pathan family that had migrated from Afghanistan but his mother was from Agra and then moved to Pakistan.

== Career ==
Jahanzeb started working as a model for advertisements and commercials and was later spotted by film director Iqbal Kashmiri at an event and offered a lead role in a film he was directing. In 1987, Jahanzeb made his acting debut in film Choron Ki Barat which was a super hit at the box office. Then he appeared in films such as Maa Bani Dulhan, Elaan-e-Jang and Allah Ditta. He later dropped his surname for his acting credits, and appeared as Jahanzeb in films Hunter Val, Choron Ka Badshah, Kali, Haseena 420, Yarana and Marshal.

In 1988, he transitioned to television and he appeared in PTV drama Flight 033 it was written by Sabeh Mohsin and directed by Qasim Jalali. The same year he appeared in film Bazar-e-Husn which was written by Pervez Kalim the film was a Golden Jubilee at the box office and won six Nigar Awards.

He also appeared in films Jang e-Jang, Kali, International Goreelay, Roop Ki Rani, Barood Ka Tohfa, Inteshar, Billu Badshah, Darya Khan and Jungli Mera Naam.

In 2002, he appeared in drama Chaandni Raatain focusing on South Asian cultural backgrounds, and issues such as polygamy, motherhood and the bond between mother and daughter-in-law. He portrayed the role of Jalal, the ex-husband of Maha Aamir (portrayed by Mahnoor Baloch).

== Personal life ==
In 1989, Jahanzeb married fashion designer and chef Farah Aaniya Alam. Farah later died from cancer in 2014. He has two daughters Parisheh Jahanzeb and Shanzeh Jahanzeb. The couple also had a son later, but he died soon after birth.

== Filmography ==
=== Television series ===
| Year | Title | Role | Network |
|---|---|---|---|
| 1988 | Flight 033 | Passenger | PTV |
| 2002 | Chaandni Raatain | Jalal | PTV |

=== Film ===
| Year | Film | Language |
|---|---|---|
| 1987 | Choron Ki Barat | Punjabi / Urdu |
| 1988 | Maa Bani Dulhan | Urdu |
| 1988 | Elaan-e-Jang | Punjabi |
| 1988 | Allah Ditta | Punjabi |
| 1988 | Choron Ka Badshah | Urdu |
| 1988 | Haseena 420 | Urdu |
| 1988 | Bazar-e-Husn | Urdu |
| 1988 | Hunter Vali | Punjabi |
| 1989 | Sheran Di Maa | Punjabi |
| 1989 | Sarfarosh | Punjabi / Urdu |
| 1989 | Taqat Ka Toofan | Urdu |
| 1989 | Yarana | Punjabi |
| 1989 | Bilaval | Punjabi |
| 1989 | Roop Ki Rani | Urdu |
| 1989 | Khuda Bakhsh | Punjabi |
| 1989 | Mazdoor | Punjabi |
| 1989 | Jang-e-Jang | Punjabi |
| 1990 | No. 1 | Urdu |
| 1990 | Jurrat | Punjabi |
| 1990 | Kali | Punjabi |
| 1990 | International Goreelay | Punjabi / Urdu |
| 1990 | Miss Cleopatra | Urdu |
| 1990 | Marshal | Punjabi |
| 1990 | Barood Ka Tohfa | Urdu / Pashto |
| 1991 | Inteshar | Punjabi |
| 1991 | Billu Badshah | Punjabi |
| 1991 | Darya Khan | Sindhi |
| 1992 | Tarazoo | Punjabi |
| 1992 | Raaz | Urdu |
| 1992 | Mohammad Khan | Punjabi |
| 1992 | Deputy | Urdu |
| 1992 | Chalbaz | Urdu |
| 1992 | Ishq Rehna Sada | Urdu |
| 1993 | Zabata | Urdu |
| 1993 | Rambo 303 | Urdu |
| 1994 | Jungli Mera Naam | Punjabi / Urdu |
