= Bazar-e-Husn =

1988 film

- Directed by: Javed Fazil; Sarwar Bhatti
- Written by: Pervez Kalim
- Produced by: Akhtar Bhatti; Akbar Bhatti; Sarwar Bhatti
- Starring: Nadeem Baig; Rangeela; Salma Agha; Samina Peerzada; Jahanzeb; Faisal Rehman; Talish; Naghma; Albela
- Cinematography: Irshad Bhatti
- Edited by: Humayun Pervaiz
- Music by: M. Ashraf
- Production companies: Shahnoor Studios, Lahore, Pakistan
- Distributed by: Jaggo Art and Rizwan Group
- Release date: 9 September 1988
- Running time: 140 minutes
- Country: Pakistan
- Language: Urdu

Bazar-e-Husn is a 1988 Pakistani drama film written by Pervez Kalim, co-directed by Javed Fazil and Sarwar Bhatti who co-produced it also, with Akhtar Bhatti and Akbar Bhatti.

The film features Nadeem Baig, Salma Agha, Samina Peerzada, Jahanzeb, Faisal Rehman and Rangeela. It was released on 9 September 1988 and was a box office success.

This film won 6 awards at the 1988 Nigar Awards.

== Plot ==
The film's plot revolves around a film director who wants to cast a beautiful and natural heroine for his next film. For this purpose, he enters a kotha, chooses a tawaif and falls for her.

Tariq is a famous film director who leads a happy life with his wife Abida and their two children. He goes to a red-light district to choose the female lead for his film where he selects Gori who acts and dances well. During the film's shooting, Gori's beauty impresses Tariq and he falls for her. He ignores his wife and children which ultimately causes adverse relations with his family. He starts to spend time with Gori while on the other hand, Gori considering it a good method to lead a joyful life, lusts for more.

== Cast ==
- Nadeem Baig
- Salma Agha
- Rangeela
- Samina Peerzada
- Jahanzeb
- Faisal Rehman
- Talish
- Naghma
- Albela

== Production ==
The film was written by Pervez Kalim, directed by Javed Fazil and Sarwar Bhatti who also produced it along with Akhtar Bhatti and Akbar Bhatti as a co-producer. Cinematography performed by Irshad Bhatti and editing by Humayun Pervaiz.

== Soundtrack ==
The soundtrack was composed by M. Ashraf. The songs were performed by Salma Agha, Mehnaz Begum and Humaira Channa.

== Remake ==
The film was remade in Bollywood titled, Pati Patni Aur Tawaif in 1990 and Salma Agha reprised her role in it. it adapted as miniseries for anthology series Boltay Afsanay (2016)

== Awards and nominations ==
Year	Award	Category	Awardee	Result	Ref.
1988	Nigar Awards	Best Film	Bazar-e-Husn	Won	
1988	Nigar Awards	Best Director	Javed Fazil	Won	
1988	Nigar Awards	Best Actress	Salma Agha	Won	
1988	Nigar Awards	Best Musician	M. Ashraf	Won	
1988	Nigar Awards	Best Lyricist	Ahmad Rahi	Won	
1988	Nigar Awards	Best Comedian	Abid Kashmiri	Won	
