= Ik Madari =

Pakistani film

Ik Madari اک مداری
- Directed by: Chaudhry Sagheer Ahmad
- Written by: Agha Ashraf
- Produced by: Malik Mohammad Rafiq; Sheikh Mohammad Ahmad
- Starring: Allauddin; Naghma; Habib; Sultan Rahi; Albela; Rangeela; Seema; Mazhar Shah; Afzal Khan; Ali Ejaz
- Cinematography: Hanif Bhatti
- Edited by: Arshad Baig
- Music by: Tafoo
- Production company: Shahnoor Studio's Qandeel Film Corporation
- Distributed by: RR Films
- Release date: 10 August 1973
- Running time: 155 minutes
- Country: Pakistan
- Language: Punjabi

Ik Madari (Punjabi: اک مداری) is a 1973 Pakistani Punjabi -language family drama movie starring Allauddin in the lead role and with Naghma, Habib, and, as the villain, Sultan Rahi

== Cast ==
- Naghma as 'Jamil's' love interest
- Habib as 'Jamil'
- Allauddin as Madari (as a juggler)
- Seema
- Mazhar Shah
- Ali Ejaz
- Nazar
- Afzal Khan
- Zumurrud
- Nasira
- Meena Chodhary
- Imdad Hussain
- Albela
- Rangeela
- Sultan Rahi
- Beena Banerjee
- Sabar Shah
- Phattu
- Nazar
- Babar Malik

== Soundtrack ==
IK MADARI

Soundtrack album by Tafoo
- Released: 10 August 1973
- Recorded: 1973
- Genre: Film soundtrack
- Length: 28:22
- Language: Punjabi
- Label: Shalimar Record Music
- Director: Chaudhry Sagheer Ahmad
- Producer: Malik Mohammad Rafiq

=== Track listing ===
The music of the film 'Ik Madari' is by Pakistani musician Tafoo.

No.	Title	Artist(s)	Length
1.	"Dunya De Wich Tera Jogi Wala Phera"	Mala and Masood Rana	7:10
2.	"Nee Kurriyo, Sun Kurriyo"	Tassawar Khanum and Irene Perveen	2:42
3.	"Mere Mukhray Taun Chan Sharmaey"	Naseem Begum and Irene Perveen	3:03
4.	"Aa Aa Merey Hania"	Irene Perveen	3:28
5.	"Mela Char Dina Da"	Mala	1:30
6.	"Terian Udeekan Vey Chann Mahi"	Noor Jehan	3:07
7.	"Sajna Na Dil Saada Taur Wey"	Noor Jehan	3:45
8.	"Tere Tu Vakh Rehna Dukhan Dey Wass Paina"	Noor Jehan Rajab Ali	3:34
