= Kajjan Begum =

Pakistani singer (1932-2000)

- Born: Imam Bandi; 24 January 1932; Lucknow, British India
- Died: 10 February 2000 (aged 68); Karachi, Sindh, Pakistan
- Education: Lucknow School
- Occupations: Singer; Classical singer
- Years active: 1940 – 2000
- Spouse: Akhtar Wasi Ali (husband)
- Children: Mehnaz Begum (daughter)
- Parent: Hussaini Begum (mother)
- Relatives: Ishrat Jehan (sister); Shamim Bano (sister)
- Awards: Pride of Performance Award by the President of Pakistan (2001)

Kajjan Begum (1932 – 2000) was a Pakistani classical and a film playback singer. Before migrating to Pakistan, she was a famous singer in India.

== Early life ==
Kajjan Begum's birth name was Imam Baandi. She was born in Lucknow, British India on 24 January 1932. Her mother, Hussaini Begum and her two younger sisters, Ishrat Jehan and Shamim Bano were also singers. She was schooled in classical singing with her two sisters at the Lucknow School.

== Career ==
She started singing Marsiya with her mother in 1940. She was later employed at Mohammad Amir Ahmed Khan's (Raja Saheb of Mahmudabad) palace, where she would sing songs and recite elegies during religious days and in the month of Muharram. On other days, she would sing thumris, kajris, dadras, purbi geets and light classical Hindustani music.

Kajjan Begum remained in India after the Partition of India for some time and became a popular singer there. In the late 1950s, she migrated to Pakistan with her family. She later started singing on Radio Pakistan, Karachi. She also trained her daughter Mehnaz Begum in classical music.

In 1962, film producer Fazal Ahmad Karim Fazli offered her a chance to sing for his film Chiragh Jalta Raha, to which she agreed. The film was a Silver Jubilee box office hit. It was premiered by Fatima Jinnah, sister of Pakistan's founder Muhammad Ali Jinnah and the chief guest in the opening ceremony held at Nishat Cinema, Karachi.

== Awards ==
She was honored with the Pride of Performance award from the Government of Pakistan for her contributions to the music Industry in 2001 (award announced on 14 August 2000, actually conferred on 23 March 2001).

== Personal life ==
Kajjan Begum married co-singer Akhtar Wasi Ali in 1952, with whom she had four children including Mehnaz Begum, who became a popular singer in Pakistan.

== Death ==
Kajjan Begum died on 10 February 2000 in Karachi, Pakistan at age 68.

== Discography ==
Song title	Sung by	Lyrics by	Music by	Notes
Kaahe Ko Biyahi Pardes Babul Mere	Kajjan Begum	Traditional wedding song	Nihal Abdullah	Film Chiragh Jalta Raha (1962)
Yeh Hari Hari Chooriyan	Kajjan Begum	Traditional wedding song		Pakistan Television production (1985)
Bannay Jhuk Jhuk Jaiyyo Susral Galliyan	Kajjan Begum	Traditional wedding song		Pakistan Television production (1985)

== Awards and recognition ==
Year	Award	Category	Result	Title	Ref.
2001	Pride of Performance	Award by the President of Pakistan	Won	Arts	
