= Suha Jora =

Pakistani film

- Directed by: Pervez Rana
- Written by: Mohammad Kemal Pasha
- Produced by: Syed Zubair Shah (Nargis's husband)
- Starring: Shaan, Nargis
- Music by: Tafoo
- Release date: 4 May 2007
- Country: Pakistan
- Language: Punjabi

Suha Jora is a 2007 Pakistani Punjabi-language film directed by Pervez Rana, starring Shaan and Nargis.

== Cast ==
- Shaan
- Nargis
- Sidra Noor
- Mustafa Qureshi
- Safqat Cheema
- Syed Raza Ali Rizvi (Child Actor)

The film's music was composed by the renowned musician Tafoo. The song lyrics were by Altaf Bajwa. The singers were Naseebo Lal and Humaira Channa.
