= Dehleez (film) =

- Original title: دہلیز
- Directed by: Mohammed Javed Fazil
- Written by: Syed Noor
- Produced by: Tariq Masood Qureshi
- Starring: Nadeem; Shabnam; Afzaal Ahmad; Agha Talish
- Edited by: Asghar
- Music by: Kamal Ahmed
- Release date: 22 April 1983
- Country: Pakistan
- Language: Urdu

Dehleez is a 1983 Pakistani Urdu-language drama film based on Emily Brontë's 1847 novel Wuthering Heights, with screenplay by Syed Noor. It started Nadeem and Shabnam with Afzaal Ahmad and Agha Talish. The music of the film was composed by Kamal Ahmed.

The film celebrated its Diamond Jubilee on the box office and won seven Nigar Awards, including best film, best director and best actor. Dehleez inspired the 1985 Hindi film Oonche Log. It was screened at the Lok Virsa Museum in 2018.

== Cast ==
- Nadeem
- Shabnam
- Shahid
- Afzaal Ahmad
- Agha Talish
- Aslam Pervaiz
- Shahida Mini

== Soundtrack ==
The music of the film was composed by Kamal Ahmed on the lyrics of Taslim Fazli.

Song	Performed by
Aaj To Ghair Sahi, Pyar Se Bair Sahi	Mehdi Hassan
Do Naino Ka Kaam Sara, Do Naino Ka Kaam Sara	Mehdi Hassan, Naheed Akhtar
Jeevan Pyar Ka Pyasa Panchhi	Mehdi Hassan
Tu Meray Sath Sath Ho To	Mehdi Hassan, Mehnaz Begum

|Ek Mein Ek Tum, Yeh Bheega Bheega Mausam |Naheed Akhtar,

== Release ==
Theatrically released on 22 April 1983, the film attained Diamond Jubilee status in the cinemas of Karachi.

== Production ==
In an interview with Herald, TV actress Khalida Riyasat revealed that she was offered a role in Dehleez, but she declined it due to being a supporting role.

== Impact ==
The film inspired the 1985 Hindi film Oonche Log, starring Rajesh Khanna and Salma Agha.

== Awards ==
Dehleez won seven Nigar Awards in the following categories:

Category	Recipient
Best Film	Noorani Productions
Best Director	Mohammed Javed Fazil
Best Actor	Nadeem
Best Scriptwriter	Syed Noor
Best cinematographer	Pervez Khan
Best Film Editor	Asghar
Best Art Director	Haji Mohiuddin
