= Albela (actor) =

Pakistani actor and comedian

- البیلا
- Born: Akhtar Hussain; 21 September 1940; Gojra, Punjab, British India
- Died: July 17, 2004 (aged 63); Lahore, Punjab, Pakistan
- Occupations: Actor; Comedian; Singer
- Years active: 1963–1994
- Children: 9, including Honey Albela
- Awards: Nigar Award in 1990

Akhtar Hussain (Punjabi: اختر حسین; 21 September 1940 – 17 July 2004), better known by his stage name Albela (Punjabi: البیلا), was a Pakistani actor, comedian and singer.

In a career spanning over 50 years, he performed in numerous films, and television and theater plays. Albela is widely recognized as a stage actor who transformed Pakistani stage acting. Some of his hit Punjabi films were Bharia Mela (1966), Badnaam (1966), Baoo Ji (1968) and Ishq Nachaway Beehi Beehi (1984).

He was also a famous singer in Punjabi.

== Personal life ==
Albela was born in Gojra, Punjab, British India (now in Toba Tek Singh District, Punjab, Pakistan) on 21 September 1940.

He had seven daughters and two sons, including Honey Albela (born Hussain Raza), who has worked in comedy shows on stage and different television channels.

== Death ==
He died of heart failure on 17 July 2004 in Lahore, at the age of 63. Before his death, Albela was admitted to Ittefaq Hospital, Lahore following heart and liver ailments. He was buried in Green Town, Mian Chowk Graveyard, in Lahore.

== Selected filmography ==
| Title | Released | Language |
|---|---|---|
| Ik Madari | 1973 | Punjabi |
| Khushia | 1973 | Punjabi |
| Begum Jaan | 1977 | Urdu |
| Pakeeza | 1979 | Urdu |
| Rustam Te Khan | 1983 | Punjabi |
| Jagga Tay Shera | 1984 | Punjabi |
| Silsila | 1987 | Punjabi |
| Roti | 1988 | Punjabi |
| Bazar-e-Husn | 1988 | Urdu |
| Sarmaya | 1990 | Punjabi |
| Hoshyar | 1990 | Punjabi |
| Zabata | 1993 | Urdu/Punjabi |
| International Luteray | 1994 | Urdu/Punjabi |

== Selected discography ==
- Mausam Vee Ashiqana. Punjabi music album released by EMI Pakistan in 1987, also featuring Mehnaz Begum and Sarwar Mehdi.
- Kali Meri Pag. Song of Albela with Masood Rana and composed by M Ashraf for the Punjabi film Allah Ditta (1988).

== Awards and recognition ==
- Nigar Award as Best Comedian for the Punjabi-language film Hoshyar (1990)

== See also ==
- List of Lollywood actors
