= Pukar (1984 film) =

Pakistani Punjabi-language film

Pukaar پُکار
- Directed by: Aizaz Syed
- Written by: Syed Noor
- Produced by: Aizaz Syed; Younis Chann
- Starring: Sultan Rahi; Mumtaz; Mustafa Qureshi; Sangeeta; Zamurrad; Nimmo; Mehmood Ghori; Jaggi Malik; Adeeb; Bahar
- Cinematography: Ali Jaan; Masood Malik
- Edited by: Qasir Zamir
- Music by: Tafoo
- Production company: Evernew Studio
- Distributed by: Chan Productions
- Release date: 2 November 1984
- Running time: 163 minutes
- Country: Pakistan
- Language: Punjabi

Pukar (Punjabi:پکار) is a 1984 Punjabi-language film from Pakistan.

Screenwriter was Syed Noor, and the film was produced and directed by Aizaz Syed. It was his directorial debut. The cast included Sultan Rahi, Mustafa Qureshi, and Mumtaz.

== Cast ==
- Sultan Rahi
- Mumtaz
- Mustafa Qureshi
- Zumurrud
- Sangeeta
- Nimmo
- Talat Siddiqi
- Adeeb
- Bahar

== Songs (album) ==
All lyrics are written by Khawaja Pervez, Waris Ludhianvi, Asghar Ali, Kousar Waraich; all music is composed by Tafoo

Pukar + Pukaar album - track listing
No.	Title	Singer(s)	Length
1.	"Traffican Ruk Gayyian.."	Noor Jehan	3:58
2.	"Dhooman Payian Lahore Karachi.."	Noor Jehan	3:47
3.	"Tenu Honiyan Kadraan Vey.."	Noor Jehan	5:07
4.	"Dil Ajj Toun Tere Naal La Baithi.."	Noor Jehan	4:30
5.	"Dil Nu Tarair Pai Gayi.."	Noor Jehan	4:30
6.	"Lutti Ve Lutti Gayi Dholna.."	Noor Jehan	4:59
Total length:			26:51
