= M. Sadiq =

Indian film director

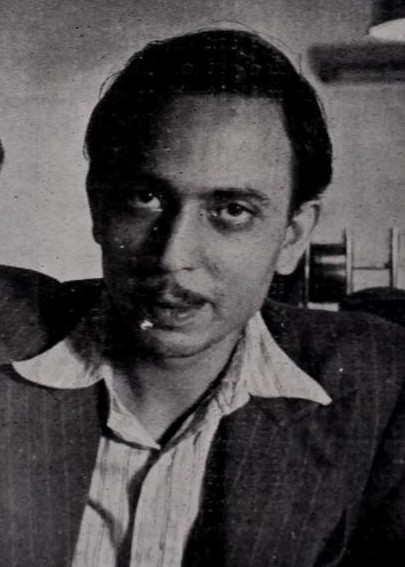
- Sadiq in 1942
- Born: Mohammed Sadiq; March 10, 1910; Lahore, British India
- Died: October 3, 1971 (aged 61); Lahore, Pakistan (went back to Lahore from India in the early 1970s)
- Occupations: Director; film producer; Scriptwriter
- Years active: 1943 – 1972
- Awards: Nigar Award in 1972

M. Sadiq (10 March 1910– 3 October 1971) was an Indian film director, producer and screenwriter.

He directed 28 films in a career spanning three decades. His notable works include Rattan (1944), Chaudhvin Ka Chand (1960), and Taj Mahal (1963), Bahu Begum (1967) and Noor Jehan (1967).

Sadiq moved to Pakistan in 1970, and died while working on Baharo Phool Barsao in Pakistan. The film was completed by film director Hassan Tariq and released in 1972.

== Career ==
Film producer Abdur Rashid Kardar launched Sadiq into film direction, with the production Namaste (1943), co-directed by S. U. Sunny.

Sadiq's commercial breakthrough came in the musical Rattan (1944), starring Karan Dewan and Swaran Lata. Film critic Baburao Patel panned the film as a "clumsy attempt" and wrote, "Sadiq has not been able to improve on his work in Namaste. On the contrary, he has gone back a bit." Nonetheless, Rattan became a box office success. After the leading studio Bombay Talkies fell apart in the early 1940s, Sadiq's success, alongside that of Mehboob Khan and Kishore Sahu, was seen as the rise of independent filmmakers in Hindi cinema.

Following Rattan, Sadiq's career underwent a decline before he accepted the directorial responsibility of Guru Dutt's production Chaudhvin Ka Chand (1960); Dutt did not wish to direct after the failure of his previous venture. Chaudhvin Ka Chand was a critical and commercial success, and is considered a prominent example of Muslim social film genre.

Commenting on Sadiq's 1963 film Taj Mahal, film critic Ziya Us Salam wrote, "Sadiq, who had earlier given us Chaudhvin ka Chand, scores as a director in the backdrop of the film by going beyond the romantic routine to take a shot at court politics ... Films about Shah Jahan and Mumtaz Mahal's romance had been made before ... Yet Sadiq's Taj Mahal remains an unparalleled ode to love."

In the early 1970s, Sadiq went back to his hometown Lahore, Pakistan to direct and produce Baharo Phool Barsao. He died in 1971, midway during production. The film was later finished by the Pakistani film director Hassan Tariq, released in 1972, and proved to be popular with audiences and also won a Nigar Award for M. Sadiq as the 'Best Scriptwriter' in 1972.

== Personal life ==
According to film historian Bunny Reuben, in late 1940s, Sadiq was chosen by actress Suraiya's family as a prospective groom. He proposed marriage to her, but she turned him down due to her romance with Dev Anand.

Writer Raju Bharatan quotes Suraiya as saying:

He was a great gentleman ... Artistic by nature and always soft-spoken, M. Sadiq directed me memorably in Kajal without once touching me. I liked him as a person for his genteel ways. Yet, between liking a man and loving a man, there is a world of difference ... the elderly Sadiq was already married with children, being a good 18 years older than I was ... Where was Dev Anand, young and single, so dashing, so romantic, so good-looking, and where was anyone else?

== Awards ==
- Nigar Award for 'Best Scriptwriter' for the film Baharo Phool Barsao in 1972.

== Filmography ==
- Namaste (1943)
- Jeevan a.k.a. Bahar (1944)
- Rattan (1944)
- Saathi (1946)
- Jag Biti (1946)
- Sham Savera (1946)
- Dak Bangla (1947)
- Kajal (1948)
- Char Din (1949)
- Anmol Ratan (1950)
- Pardes (1950)
- Sabak (1950)
- Khazana (1951)
- Saiyan (1951)
- Poonam (1952)
- Shabaab (1954)
- Musafirkhana (1955)
- Chhoo Mantar (1956)
- Anjaan (1956)
- Mai Baap (1957)
- Duniya Rang Rangili (1957)
- Khota Paisa (1958)
- Jawani Ki Hawa (1959)
- Chaudhvin Ka Chand (1960)
- Taj Mahal (1963)
- Bahu Begum (1967)
- Noor Jehan (1967)
- Baharo Phool Barsao (1972; Pakistani release)
- Deedar (1974; Pakistani release)

== Sources ==
- Rajadhyaksha, Ashish; Willemen, Paul (1998). The Encyclopedia of Indian Cinema. British Film Institute. ISBN 9781135943257.
