= Oonche Log (1985 film) =

- Promotional poster
- Directed by: Brij
- Produced by: Raj Kumar Kapoor; Sudha Sadanah; R. P. Sharma
- Starring: Rajesh Khanna; Salma Agha
- Music by: R. D. Burman
- Release date: 1985
- Country: India
- Language: Hindi

Oonche Log (transl. Exalted people) is an Indian Hindi-language film directed by Brij. The film stars Rajesh Khanna, Salma Agha as the main lead characters. This film is remake of the 1966 film Dil Diya Dard Liya and the Pakistani film Dehleez (1983). The film's cinematography, music of R. D. Burman, performance of Rajesh Khanna, Prem Chopra, Danny Denzongpa were critically praised, but Salma Agha's performance was criticised.

== Cast ==
- Rajesh Khanna as Raju / Rai Bahadur Rajdev Singh
- Salma Agha as Poonam Singh
- Pradeep Kumar as Thakur Vikram Singh
- Prem Chopra as Thakur Pratap Singh
- Danny Denzongpa as Thakur Maan Singh
- Deven Verma as Mubarak Ali
- Raza Murad as Khan
- Priti Sapru as Sonia
- Pinchoo Kapoor as Rai Bahadur

== Soundtrack ==
The music was composed by R. D. Burman. Brij insisted on using the same tune and lyrics of "Aaj Tu Gair Sahi" of the Pakistani film Dehleez, sung by Mehdi Hasan, in this film the same song was recorded with Kishore Kumar. This version with orchestration by R. D. Burman was appreciated.

=== Track listing ===
Lyrics: Anjaan

Song	Singer
"Aaj Tu Gair Sahi"	Kishore Kumar
"Dil Kya Chaahe"	Kishore Kumar
"Tera Ghar Teri Galiyan"	Kishore Kumar
"Tu Mera Kya Lage O Saathiya, Jhin Jhin Tara"	Kishore Kumar, Salma Agha
"O Sajna O Sajna"	Salma Agha
