= Angara (film) =

1985 film

- Directed by: Mohammad Ikram
- Written by: Saeed Sahili
- Produced by: Mohammad Ikram
- Starring: Yousuf Khan; Aasia; Sultan Rahi; Allauddin; Ilyas Kashmiri; Sabiha Khanum; Neelofar; Saiqa; Tariq Shah; Khawar Abbas; Rehan; Khalid Saleem Mota
- Cinematography: Nabi Ahmad
- Edited by: Zamir Qamar, Qaisar Zamir
- Music by: Kemal Ahmed
- Production companies: M M Films; Bari Studio
- Release date: July 26, 1985 (Pakistan)
- Running time: 160 minutes
- Country: Pakistan
- Language: Punjabi

Angara (Punjabi: انگارہ, lit. 'Cinder') is a 1985 Pakistani Punjabi language action film. It was directed and produced by Mohammad Ikram and starred Yousuf Khan, Aasia, Ilyas Kashmiri and Sultan Rahi.

== Cast ==
- Yousuf Khan as Jagga
- Aasia as (lover of Jagga)
- Sultan Rahi as (Sohna Daku)
- Allauddin as (Moulvie Saab)
- Ilyas Kashmiri as (Jageerdar)
- Sabiha Khanum as (mother of Jageerdar)
- Saiqa as (Sister of Jagga)
- Rehan
- Neelofar
- Khalid Saleem Mota
- Tariq Shah as (Farangi)
- Khawar Abbas
- Shahida
- Imrozia
- Iqbal Durrani
- Changezi
- Nadir Shah

== Track list ==
The music of the film Angara is by famous musician Kamal Ahmed. The lyrics are penned by Waris Ludhianvi and Saeed Gailani and the playback singers are

- Shaukat Ali
- Mehnaz
- Naheed Akhtar
- Masood Rana

#	Title	Singer(s)
1	"Ve Main Bindya Lahoron"	Naheed Akhtar
2	"Tere Mere Pyar Di"	Mehnaz
3	"Jaggay Jut Da Na Sani Koi"	Masood Rana & Naheed Akhtar
4	"Teri Meri Aey Azlan Di Yaari"	Mehnaz and Shaukat Ali
