= Naghma (Pakistani actress) =

Pakistani actress

- نغمہ
- Born: Zubaida Begum; 25 March 1945 (age 81); Lahore, British India
- Other name: Nagma Begum
- Occupation: Film actress
- Years active: 1960 - present
- Spouse: Habib (m. 1972; div. 1988)
- Children: 1
- Awards: Nigar Award (Lifetime Achievement Award in 2000); Pride of Performance Award by the President of Pakistan in 2023

Naghma Begum, or just Naghma (born 25 March 1945), is a Pakistani film and television actress.

She has worked in more than 350 Urdu and Punjabi movies from 1960 to 2018. In 2000, she was honoured with the "Lifetime Achievement Nigar Award" for her 50 years long acting career. For her contribution to the television industry, she was honoured by the Government of Pakistan with the Pride of Performance Award in 2023.

== Early life ==
Naghma was born as Zubaida Begum on 25 March 1945 in Lahore, Punjab, British India.

== Career ==
She first acted in director M.J. Rana's Punjabi film Rani Khan released in 1960. She did not get a major role in that film, but she got an identity through it. Naghma's second film was Chaudhri, directed by Muzaffar Tahir. This film was also in Punjabi language and she starred as the heroine in the film. It was released on 12 May 1962.

Naghma's first Urdu film was director Shabab Kiranvi's Mehtab, which was a super hit. In that film, Nayyar Sultana and Habib played the lead roles. A song from the movie "Gol Gappay Wala Aya Gol Gappay Laya" in the voice of Ahmed Rushdi became very popular. Her second Urdu film, Maan Ke Ansu, was also directed by Kiranvi and was released in 1963. The hero of the film was Habib and the heroine was Nayyar Sultana. Naghama played the role of a side heroine in this film. She was paired with actor Roshan and the song "Saman Jab Piyara Piyara Ho" picturized on them was very popular those days. Afterward, her career kept flourishing and she was a 'busy actress' during the late 1960s and early 1970s.

From 1968 to 1974, Naghma was at peak of her film career. During that period, she was among the top film actresses along with Firdous, Rani, and Rozina. Naghma and Habib's was one of the most popular romantic screen duos. After 1974, Naghama's career declined and she was replaced by Aasia, Sangeeta, Mumtaz and Najma. Being in the film industry for the past sixty years, she has worked in more than 350 films. She then worked in a Punjabi film Dikar Gujjar Da which was released in 2018. After working in films for many years, she started working in TV dramas such as Mil Ke Bhi Hum Na Mile, Jackson Heights, Sadqay Tumhare and Preet Na Kariyo Koi.

In 2023, she was honoured by the Government of Pakistan with the Pride of Performance Award for her contributions towards the film and television industry.

== Personal life ==
Naghma first married filmmaker and cameraman Akbar Irani but the marriage was not successful. Then, she married actor Habib in 1972, but divorced him after 16 years of marriage in 1988. Both had a daughter Zarina. In the later years of her career, Naghma faced some financial issues.

== Acting career ==
=== Television series ===
Year	Title	Role	Network
2012	Mil Ke Bhi Hum Na Mile	Hajra	Geo Entertainment
2014	Jackson Heights	Imran's mother	Urdu 1
2014	Sadqay Tumhare	Bee Ji	Hum TV
2015	Preet Na Kariyo Koi	Ilyas's mother	Hum TV
2017	Rani	Rani's mother	Geo TV
2019	The Shareef Show Mubarak Ho	Herself	Geo Entertainment

=== Film ===
Year	Film	Language
1964	Hath Jori	Punjabi
1968	Babul Da Vehra	Punjabi
1969	Mukhra Chun Varga	Punjabi
1969	Diya Aur Toofan	Urdu
1970	Anwara	Punjabi
1970	Att Khuda Da Ver	Punjabi
1972	Khan Chacha	Punjabi
1972	Sajjan Bay Parva	Punjabi
1973	Ik Madari	Punjabi
1975	Haar Gaya Insaan	Urdu
1988	Bazar-e-Husn	Urdu

== Awards and recognition ==
Year	Award	Category	Result	Title	Ref.
2000	Nigar Award	Lifetime Achievement Award	Won	Herself	
2023	Pride of Performance	Awarded by the President of Pakistan	Won	Arts	
