= Wehshi Gujjar =

1979 film

- Directed by: Yunus Malik; Anwar Kamal Pasha
- Written by: Mohammad Kamal Pasha
- Produced by: Hajji Mohabbat Ali
- Starring: Sultan Rahi; Aasia; Najma; Iqbal Hassan; Ishrat Chaudhary; Afzal Ahmad; Sawan; Bahar Begum; Adeeb; Munawar Saeed; Changezi; Chakori
- Cinematography: Masud Butt
- Music by: Tafoo
- Release date: 25 August 1979
- Running time: 175 minutes
- Country: Pakistan
- Language: Punjabi

Wehshi Gujjar is a 1979 Pakistani Punjabi action musical movie produced by Haji Mohabbat Ali and starring Sultan Rahi, Aasia, Iqbal Hassan, Afzaal Ahmad, and Adeeb. It was written and directed by Yunus Malik, Anwar Kamal Pasha.

== Plot ==
The movie was first to be released as 'Jagga Tax' but the name was changed to 'Wehshi Gujjar' later.

== Cast ==
- Sultan Rahi
- Aasia
- Najma
- Iqbal Hassan
- Afzaal Ahmad
- Sawan
- Bahar Begum
- Adeeb
- Jaggi Malik
- Khayyam
- Munawar Saeed
- Altaf Khan
- Changezi
- Saleem Hassan
- Zahir Shah
- Iqbal Durrani
- Badal
- Chakori
- Ishrat Chaudhary
- Mizla
- Imrozia

== Track list ==
The film soundtrack was composed by the musician Ustad Tafu, with lyrics by Hazeen Qadri and sung by Noor Jehan, Mehnaz.

#	Title	Singer(s)
1	"Teri Hikk Tey Aalna Panwan"	Noor Jehan
2	"Mujra Akhiyan Vich Gharoor Qaid Na"	Noor Jehan and Mehnaz
3	"Tere Aan Dey Kharak Bare Hon Gai"	Noor Jehan
4	"Ajj Lanwan Aesa Thumka Tere"	Noor Jehan
5	"Lahore Shahar Taun Junj Charhi"	Noor Jehan, Mehnaz
6	"Way Jaggeya Teri Akh Da"	Noor Jehan
