= Deedar (Pakistani film) =

1974 film

- Original title: دیدار
- Directed by: Hassan Tariq
- Story by: M. Sadiq
- Starring: Rani; Shahid; Waheed Murad
- Music by: Nashad
- Release date: 1974
- Country: Pakistan
- Language: Urdu

Deedar is a Pakistani drama film directed by Hassan Tariq, based on a story by M. Sadiq, and starring Rani and Waheed Murad as the leads with Shahid in a pivotal role.

The film is about the concept of Nikah Halala, where two star-crossed lovers try to reconcile after a separation due to their generational animosity.

Shahid was lauded for her performance in the film, and he went on to win a Nigar award for Best Supporting Actor.

== Plot ==
Zeenat and Nawabzada Sartaaj fall in love with each other despite the generational animosity of their families. They marry against the will of their families. However, Sartaaj's father, Nawab Waqar Ali, harbors a long-standing grudge against Zeenat's father, Nawab Tajammal Hussain. Seeking revenge, he manipulates events to forcibly have Zeenat divorced from Sartaaj.

Despite his deep love, the heartbroken and helpless Sartaaj gives in to his father's pressure and reluctantly divorces Zeenat. However, after their divorce, Sartaaj remembers her intensely. Unable to live without her, he devises a plan to remarry her by arranging a halala. He pleads with his closest friend, Nawab Mirza Shah Rukh, to marry Zeenat temporarily and divorce her the next day, enabling him to remarry her. He eventually agrees out of friendship and marries Zeenat, but soon refuses to fulfill the promise of divorce. A rift is created between both the friends when Sartaaj leanrs that he has denied of divorce due to the reason that Zeenat's is exactly the same girl whom he imagines as his beloved one.

== Cast ==
- Rani as Zeenat
- Waheed Murad as Nawabzada Sartaaj
- Shahid as Nawab Mirza Shah Rukh
- Agha Talish as Nawab Waqar Ali
- Sabiha Khanum as Begum Nawab Waqar Ali
- Darpan as Nawab Tajammal Hussain
- Nayyar Sultana as Begum Nawab Tajammal Hussain
- Nanha as Ustaad Allauddin
- Saqi as Miadaad Khan
- Mumtaz as Zohra Jamal

== Production ==
Hassan Tariq directed the film, based on a story by M. Sadiq who had migrated from India and was famous in Bollywood for directing the Muslim-social Chaudhvin Ka Chand (1960).

== Box office ==
Deedar was commercially unsuccessful film of 1974.

== Awards ==
Deedar won two Nigar Awards in the following categories:

Year	Award	Category	Awardee	Ref.
1974	Nigar Awards	Best Supporting Actor	Shahid	
1974	Nigar Awards	Best Art Director	Islam Shahabi	
