= Najma (actress) =

Pakistani film actress

- نجمہ
- Occupation: Film actress
- Years active: 1972 – 1994
- Known for: Dancing roles in Urdu and Punjabi films
- Spouse: Ghulam Mustafa Rind
- Awards: Best actress Nigar Award (1978)

Najma is a former Pakistani film actress. She appeared in more than 100 Urdu and Punjabi movies during the 1970s and 1980s. Her notable movies include Zeenat (1975), Toofan (1976), Sargent (1977), Shola (1978), and Wehshi Gujjar (1979).

She won the Best Actress Nigar Award in 1978.

== Career ==
Najma started her career with a guest appearance in the Punjabi film Heera in 1972. But her first notable movie Khanzada was released in 1975. She performed as a supporting actress in the film. The film was a commercial success and opened doors for Najma at Lollywood. Later, she appeared in several Urdu and Punjabi movies.

One of her notable films was an action thriller Urdu movie Sargent (1977) which was directed by Aslam Irani. Her role of a club dancer in the movie was much appreciated. She acted as a heroine in the film opposite Asif Khan. One year later, she appeared in another successful Punjabi film, Shola, and won a Nigar Award in the category of 'Best Actress' in 1978.

== Personal life ==
After release of her last Pashto film, Najma married Ghulam Mustafa Rind, a feudal lord from Mehran, Sindh and left her acting career.

== Selected filmography ==
Najma appeared in 119 films, including 29 Urdu, 83 Punjabi, and 7 Pashto language movies:

- 1975: Khanzada (Punjabi)
- 1975: Hathkari (Punjabi)
- 1976: Baghawat (Punjabi)
- 1976: Toofan (Punjabi)
- 1976: Baghi Tay Farangi (Punjabi)
- 1976: Licence (Punjabi)
- 1976: Jatt Kurrian Taun Darda (Punjabi)
- 1976: Mohabbat Aur Dosti (Urdu)
- 1976: Hashar Nashar (Punjabi)
- 1977: 2 Chor (Punjabi)
- 1977: Uff Yeh Biwiyan (Urdu)
- 1977: Dildar Sadqay (Punjabi)
- 1977: 3 Badshah (Punjabi)
- 1977: Jeera Sain (Punjabi)
- 1977: Sargent (Urdu)
- 1977: Chor Sipahi (Punjabi)
- 1977: Jabroo (Punjabi)
- 1977: Qanoon (Punjabi)
- 1977: Suha Jora (Punjabi)
- 1977: Aj Diyan Kurrian (Punjabi)
- 1978: Takrao (Urdu)
- 1978: Shola (Punjabi)
- 1978: Curfew Order (Punjabi)
- 1978: Boycott (Punjabi)
- 1978: Sharif Ziddi (Punjabi)
- 1979: Wehshi Gujjar (Punjabi)
- 1979: Gehray Zakham (Urdu)

== Awards ==
Year	Award	Category	Result	Film	Ref.
1978	Nigar Award	Best Actress, Category: Punjabi-language films	Won	Shola	
