= Jatt Kurrian Taun Darda =

1976 film

Jatt Kurrian Taun Darda (1976 film)
- Directed by: Syed Kamal
- Music by: Wajahat Attre
- Release date: 1976
- Country: Pakistan
- Language: Punjabi

Jatt Kurrian Taun Darda
- Awards: Won 3 Nigar Awards in 1976

Jatt Kurrian Taun Darda is a 1976 Pakistani Punjabi-language film directed by Syed Kamal.

== Cast ==
- Kamal
- Neelo
- Nisho
- Najma
- Rangeela
- Aslam Pervaiz

== Release date and box office ==
This film was released on 15 October 1976. Film music was scored by Wajahat Attre and film songs lyrics were by Khawaja Pervaiz.

== Awards ==
Year	Film	Award	Category	Awardee
1976	Jatt Kurrian Taun Darda Mara	Nigar Award	Best music	Wajahat Attre
1976	Jatt Kurrian Taun Darda Mara	Nigar Award	Best actress	Neelo
1976	Jatt Kurrian Taun Darda Mara	Nigar Award	Best actor	Syed Kamal
