= Sarfarosh (1989 film) =

1989 film

Sarfarosh سَرفرُوش
- Directed by: Iqbal Kashmiri
- Written by: Nasir Adeeb
- Screenplay by: Nasir Adeeb
- Story by: Nasir Adeeb
- Produced by: Sheikh Nazir Hussain; Roy Muhammad Yousuf; Malik Zulfiqar Ahmed
- Starring: Sultan Rahi; Neeli; Jahanzeb; Sashma Shahee; Qavi; Abid Ali; Rangeela
- Narrated by: Khalid Yousuf
- Cinematography: Pervaiz Khan
- Edited by: Zamir Qamir; Qasir Zamir
- Music by: Mushtaq Ali
- Production companies: International Studio, (Karachi)
- Distributed by: New Evershine Films
- Release date: 24 February 1989 (Pakistan)
- Running time: 153 minutes
- Country: Pakistan
- Language: Punjabi

Sarfarosh (Punjabi: سَرفروش) is a 1989 Pakistani action film, directed by Iqbal Kashmiri and produced by Sheikh Nazir Hussain. The film stars actors Neeli, Sultan Rahi, Sushma Shahi, Abid Ali.

== Cast ==
- Sultan Rahi
- Neeli
- Jahanzeb
- Sushma Shahi
- Rangeela
- Abid Ali
- Qavi Khan
- Abid Butt
- Faisel Iqbal
- Aslam Latar
- Asim Bukhari

== Soundtrack ==
Sarfarosh

Soundtrack album by Mushtaq Ali
- Released: 1989
- Recorded: 1988
- Genre: Film soundtrack
- Length: 42:59
- Language: Punjabi
- Label: Super Musical
- Director: Iqbal Kashmiri
- Producer: Sheikh Nazir; Lyrics; Habib Jalib; Singers; Noor Jehan; Ghulam Abbas; Humaira Channa

=== Track listing ===
| No. | Title | Artist(s) | Length |
|---|---|---|---|
| 1. | "Akhir Kyun" | Ghulam Abbas | 5:00 |
| 2. | "Nach Ni Jinday Meriye" | Noor Jehan | 4:19 |
| 3. | "Reshmi Ae Bolda Badan, Haei Terey Lai Ae Jan-e-Man" | Noor Jehan | 5:05 |
| 4. | "Dukh Howain Na Dholan Yaar" | Noor Jehan | 4:23 |
| 5. | "Tera Mera Mera Tera Ae Pyar Sajna" | Humaira Channa | 4:12 |
