= Kamal Irani =

Pakistani actor (1932–1989)

- Born: Syed Kamal Udin Safavi; 5 August 1932; Hyderabad, British India
- Died: 13 September 1989 (aged 57); Karachi, Pakistan
- Occupation: Actor
- Years active: 1962–1979

Syed Kamal Udin Safavi (5 August 1932 – 13 September 1989), popularly known as Kamal Irani, was a Pakistani film actor who worked in over 244 films in various languages including Urdu, Punjabi, Pashto, and Sindhi.

== Life and career ==
Irani was born on 5 August 1932, in Hyderabad, British India, and moved to Karachi, Pakistan, with his family after the partition in 1947.

Irani started his acting career in the mid-1950s and quickly became one of the most popular actors of Pakistani cinema (Lollywood) during the 1960s and 1970s. He was known for his versatility as an actor and appeared in a variety of roles ranging from romantic leads to villainous characters. Some of his notable films include Shaheed (1962) Mera Naam Hai Mohabbat (1975), Safaid Khoon, Aag Aur Aansoo, and Dil Aur Duniya (1971).

== Death ==
Kamal Irani died on 13 September 1989, in Karachi, Sindh, Pakistan, at the age of 57 due to a heart attack.

== Films ==
| Year | Title |
|---|---|
| 1962 | Chiragh Jalta Raha |
| 1964 | Bees Din |
| 1964 | Heera Aur Pathar |
| 1964 | Tauba |
| 1966 | Aina |
| 1966 | Hum Dono |
| 1966 | Jaag Utha Insan |
| 1970 | Afsana |
| 1972 | Baharo Phool Barsao |
| 1974 | Khatarnak |
| 1975 | Aik Gunnah Aur Sahi |
| 1976 | Sohni Mahiwal |
| 1977 | Sargent |
| 1979 | Pakeezah |
| 1980 | Chotay Nawab |

== See also ==
- List of Lollywood actors
