= Toofan (1976 film) =

1976 film

- Directed by: Hassan Askari
- Screenplay by: Nasir Adeeb
- Produced by: Hassan Askari
- Starring: Aasia; Sultan Rahi; Iqbal Hassan; Najma; Afzaal Ahmad; Mustafa Qureshi; Saiqa
- Cinematography: Irshad Ahmad
- Music by: Safdar Hussain
- Release date: 2 April 1976
- Country: Pakistan
- Language: Punjabi

Toofan is a 1976 Pakistani Punjabi film directed and produced by Hassan Askari. The film starred Aasia, Sultan Rahi, Iqbal Hassan, Najma, Afzaal Ahmad, and Mustafa Qureshi.

Toofan was a 'super hit' movie and won 3 Nigar Awards, including the 'Best Film' in the Punjabi language for the year 1976.

== Plot ==
The main character of the story is a retired soldier who walks with a limp but takes revenge on his enemies.

== Cast ==
- Aasia
- Sultan Rahi
- Iqbal Hassan
- Najma
- Afzaal Ahmad
- Mustafa Qureshi
- Bahar
- Saiqa
- Khalid Saleem Mota
- Jaggi Malik

== Release and box office ==
Toofan was released on 9 April 1976. It was declared as a golden jubilee hit.

== Music and soundtracks ==
The music was composed by Safdar Hussain and lyrics were penned by Waris Ludhyanvi:

- Agg Lag Jandi Jithun Langdi... Singer: Mehdi Hassan

== Awards ==
Year	Film	Award	Category	Awardee	Ref.
1976	Toofan	Nigar Award	Best film	Hassan Askari	
1976	Toofan	Nigar Award	Best director	Hassan Askari	
1976	Toofan	Nigar Award	Best script writer	Nasir Adeeb	
