= Ittefaq Hospital =

Coordinates: 32°28′31″N 74°20′14″E

Geography
- Location: located near H Block Model Town, Lahore, Punjab, Pakistan

Organisation
- Type: private hospital

Services
- Emergency department: Yes

Ittefaq Hospital is a private hospital Trust located near H Block Model Town, Lahore, Punjab, Pakistan. Hospital was established by the Ittefaq Hospital Trust in 1984 by the family members of the Ittefaq family.

== Other facilities available in Ittefaq Hospital ==
Accident & Emergencies, Medicine & Allied Specialties, Clinical & Interventional Cardiology, Surgery & Allied Specialties, Orthopaedic & Traumatology, Gynae & Obstetrics, Paeds (Neonatology & Cardiology), Ophthalmology, Diagnostic Radiology & Imaging, Pathology Lab, Dentistry, Anaesthesiology, Physiotherapy, General OPDs.

In 1999 establish.
