= Tasawar Khanum =

Pakistani singer

- Born: Tasawar Khanum; 1 January 1948 (age 78); Gujrat, Punjab, Pakistan
- Occupations: Singer – Ghazal and film playback singer
- Awards: Pride of Performance Award by the President of Pakistan (2006)

Tasawar Khanum (Urdu: تصورخانم - born 1948) is a Pakistani Ghazal and playback film singer. She is mostly known for singing in Urdu and Punjabi in Pakistani films and television during the 1970s and 1980s.

== Early life and career ==
Tasawar Khanum was born in Gujrat, Pakistan. During her childhood she was a neighbor of singer Pervez Mehdi who was a good friend of her father. She and her father would often go to Pervaiz Mehdi's house while he was practicing. Pervaiz Mehdi asked her father to ensure that Tassawar should receive an education in music after he overheard her copying him while he practiced. After this, she began to take music lessons with sarangi nawaz Ustad Butta Ali Khan.

Tassawar Khanum first appeared on Pakistan Television (PTV). She was popular in the 1970s and 1980s when she sang many super-hit film songs including this mega-hit song from film Rangeela (1970), "Wey Sab Taun Sohneya, Hai Wey Mann Mohnya".

== Filmography ==
Film	Date of Release	Language	Country of Release
Anmol	10 August 1973	Urdu	Pakistan
Melay Sajna Dey	1972	Punjabi	Pakistan
Baharo Phool Barsao	11 August 1972	Urdu	Pakistan
Rangeela	1970	Punjabi	Pakistan
Yaar Badshah	1971	Punjabi	Pakistan

== Popular songs ==
- Wey Sab Taun Sohneya, Hai Wey Mann Mohnya
- Main Kehyea, Gall Sun Ja.. (film Yaar Badshah - 1971)
- Mera Dilbar, Mera Dildar Tun En.. (film Jagday Rehna - 1972)
- Es Jagg Di Jaddun Tak Kahani Raway.. (film Ik Pyar Tay 2 Parchhawen - 1972)
- Agar Tum Mil Jao, Zamana Chhor Den Gay Ham.. (film Imandar - 1974)
- Tu Meri Zindagi Hay, Tu Meri Har Khushi Hay.. (film Mohabbat Mar Nahin Sakti - 1977)

== Personal life ==
Tassawar Khanum was married to Rais Ghulam Ali Khan Marri in 1973 until his death in 1988. She has a son and two daughters and several grandchildren. She got married right after she recorded her song in film Rangeela (1970) which became highly popular later.

== Awards and recognition ==
- Pride of Performance Award by the President of Pakistan in 2006.
