= Sher Khan (1981 film) =

Pakistani film

Sher Khan شیر خان
- Directed by: Younis Malik
- Written by: Nasir Adeeb
- Produced by: Anwar Kamal Pasha
- Starring: Sultan Rahi; Anjuman; Mustafa Qureshi; Aliya Begum; Nazli; Adeeb; Bahar; Talish; Habib; Nanha; Mumtaz; Ilyas Kashmiri; Iqbal Hassan
- Cinematography: Masud Butt
- Edited by: Asghar, Mureed Hussain
- Music by: Wajahat Attre
- Production companies: Jaggu Art's; Evernew Studio
- Distributed by: Al Kuwait Films
- Release date: August 2, 1981
- Running time: 162 minutes
- Country: Pakistan
- Language: Punjabi

Sher Khan (Punjabi: شیر خان) is a 1981 Pakistani action and musical film. It is directed by Younis Malik and produced by Anwar Kamal Pasha, starring Sultan Rahi, Anjuman, Iqbal Hassan, and Mustafa Qureshi.

== Cast ==
- Sultan Rahi
- Anjuman as Tange wali
- Nazli as Bano
- Iqbal Hassan as Sher Khan
- Nannha as Gamoo
- Mustafa Qureshi as Haibat Khan
- Seema as Mother of Haibat khan
- Bahar Begum as Sabira
- Aliya Begum
- Mumtaz
- Habib as Jailer
- Adeeb as friend of Sher Khan
- Ilyas Kashmiri as Hashim Khan
- Altaf Khan
- Iqbal Durrani
- Haider Abbas
- Huma Dar
- Badaal
- Maqbool Butt

=== Guests ===
- Talish
- Rehan
- Aliya
- Changezi
- Ladla

== Reception ==
This film became a runaway success and became a diamond jubilee film. When released, it was one of the highest-grossing film in the history of Pakistan. It ran for 5 years in various cinemas. Anjuman became an overnight star through this film. This movie started the Anjuman-Sultan Rahi era in the Pakistani Punjabi film industry. They appeared in a record number of 117 films together.

== Awards ==
Sher Khan won 5 Nigar Awards in 1981: for Best Film, Best Director, Best Actor, Best Actress and Best Music in the Pakistani films (Punjabi language) category.

== Film soundtrack ==
The music of the film is by musician Wajahat Attre.

Sher Khan

Soundtrack album by Wajahat Attre
- Released: August 2, 1981
- Recorded: M Zafar
- Genre: Film soundtrack
- Length: 27:04
- Language: Punjabi
- Label: EMI Musical
- Director: Zahoor Ahmed
- Producer: Nijmi Khurshad
- Compiler: Khawaja Pervez; Waris Ludhianavi

Wajahat Attre chronology
Maula Jatt	Sher Khan	Chan Varyam

The lyrics were penned by Waris Ludhianavi and Khawaja Pervez. This was one of Wajahat Attre's three hit scores from the year 1981, the others being Chan Varyam (1981) and Sala Sahib (1981).

=== Track listing ===
No.	Title	Artist(s)	Length
1.	"Main Vi Badnam Sayyan, Tu Vi Badnam En.."	Noor Jehan	3:06
2.	"Chhad Kay Mela Tur Chalya En.."	Masood Rana	4:55
3.	"Jhanjhria Pehna Do, Bindia Vi Chamka Do.."	Noor Jehan	5:14
4.	"Tun En Mahi Chhaila, Tay Main Aan Teri Laila.."	Noor Jehan	4:41
5.	"Main Charhi Chubaray Ishq, Ajj Lay Kay Tera Naa.."	Noor Jehan	5:07
6.	"Tu Jay Meray, Hamesha Kol Rahwen.."	Noor Jehan	4:02
