= Khatarnak (1974 film) =

Pakistani erotic thriller film

- خطرناک
- Directed by: Rehmat Ali
- Screenplay by: Saadat Hussain Zaidi
- Based on: The Lone Star Ranger (1914 novel)
- Produced by: Shahid Afzal
- Starring: Neelo; Yousuf Khan; Anita; Mustafa Qureshi; Afzaal Ahmad
- Cinematography: Ashiq Mirza, Masoodur Rhman
- Music by: Safdar Hussain
- Production company: Daha Pictures
- Release date: 23 August 1974
- Country: Pakistan
- Language: Punjabi

Khatarnak is a 1974 Pakistani Punjabi erotic action film directed by Rehmat Ali. The lead cast includes Neelo, Yousuf Khan, Anita, Mustafa Qureshi, and Afzaal Ahmad.

== Plot ==
The central idea of Khatarnak was taken from the 1914 Western novel The Lone Star Ranger. A young man seeks revenge for his parents who are murdered by a criminal gang.

== Cast ==
- Neelo
- Yousuf Khan
- Anita
- Mustafa Qureshi
- Afzaal Ahmad
- Kemal Irani
- Ajmal
- Fazil Butt
- Seema
- Nanha
- Zarqa
- Raj Multani
- Azam
- Shehzad
- (Guest appearances: Nazli, Mizla, Humaira Choudhary)

== Music and soundtracks ==
The music of Khatarnak was composed by Safdar Hussain and lyrics were penned by Khawaja Pervaiz:

- Akho Jee, Main Tahaday Naal Karni Aan Pyar... Singer(s): Rubina Badar
- Charian Khushian Yaar Dian, Meray Lagday Na Kidray Pair... Singer(s): Mala
- Hey Main, Dil Neun Dena, Tu Pawen Karen Lakh Minta... Singer(s): Mala
- Pyar Meinu Kar, Meray Wallun Ajj Teinu Purian Ijaztan... Singer(s): Mala
- Teray Sadqay Way Dildara, Ajj Mukian Ne Tangan Pyar Dian... Singer(s): Noor Jehan
- Touch Me Not! Main Teri Aan, Main Teri, Gall Shak Di Kehri... Singer(s): Mala
- Way Neray Neray Aa, Seenay Naal La, Ik Mik Ho Kay Leye Aj Da Sawad... Singer(s): Mala

== Release, box office, and reception ==
Khatarnak was released on 23 August 1974. The film was crowned as a jubilee hit at both Lahore and Karachi circuits. Despite being a box-office success, Khatarnak received huge criticism due to its vulgar songs and dances. The film also faced bans from time to time after its initial release in theaters.

== Awards ==
Year	Film	Award	Category	Awardee	Ref.
1974	Khatarnak	Nigar Award	Best Actress	Neelo	
1974	Khatarnak	Nigar Award	Best Cinematographer	Masood-ur-Rehman	

== Trivia ==
Khatarnak was a come-back movie in the career of actress Neelo who had left films since 1969.
