= Diya Aur Toofan (1969 film) =

1969 Pakistani film

- Directed by: Rangeela
- Written by: Syed Noor
- Produced by: Rangeela
- Starring: Naghma; Rangeela; Ejaz Durrani; Nadeem
- Cinematography: Naeem Rizvi
- Music by: Kamal Ahmed
- Release date: 9 May 1969
- Country: Pakistan
- Language: Urdu

Diya Aur Toofan (Urdu: دیا اور طوفان, lit. 'The Lamp and the Storm') is a 1969 Pakistani, Urdu romantic comedy film which is Produced & Directed by Rangeela.

It also stars Munawar Zarif, Naghma, Ejaz Durrani, Nadeem Baig and Agha Talish. It tells a story of a woman who marries the man she falls in love with but who dies before the marriage could be consummated, she is then thrown out of her in laws because they find out she is pregnant.

== Plot ==
Diya aur Toofan tells the story of a tourist named Akbar (Ejaz Durrani) who travels to Muree and who's also a painter. He falls in love with the daughter, Sabrah (Naghma) of the man he's living with as a paying guest. Akbar convinces his mother that he wants to marry Sabrah and only her and the mother finally agrees. But on the day of the wedding, Akbar has an accident and they don't manage to consummate their marriage but she is thrown out of her in-laws home, when they find out she is pregnant.

Sabrah leaves home and is saved by Nawab Sahib (Agha Talish), when she's nearly hit by a car. He takes Sabrah home and treats her as his daughter. Sabrah gives birth to a girl Salma (Rani).

Salma is saved from a poisonous snake by no other than Akbar who she doesn't know is her father.

== Film's reception ==
This film's comedy is acted out by {Rangeela} as Deewana and {Munawar Zarif} as Abdullah and stars many others in small roles such as {Nadeem Baig}. Rangeela received surprisingly good reviews by the film critics as a producer, director and singer for this film in 1969.

== Cast ==
- Rangeela - Deewana
- Naghma - Sabrah
- Rani - Salma
- Ejaz - Akbar
- Munawar Zarif - Abdullah
- Zulfi
- Agha Talish - Nawab Sahib
- Nadeem Baig - Doctor

== Hit song from this film ==
- "Gaa Meray Manwa Gaata Jaa Re" Sung and written by Rangeela, music by Kamal Ahmed.
