= Khalid Hussain =

Norwegian-Pakistani writer and film producer

- Born: 1969 (age 56–57)
- Occupations: writer and film producer
- Writing career
- Notable work: Pakkis

Khalid Hussain (Urdu: خالد حسین; born 1969 in Pakistan) is a Norwegian-Pakistani writer and film producer. Hussain moved to Norway, without his parents, in 1975. He came to attention after writing the book Pakkis in 1986. Hussain visits high schools to discuss his writing and life as an immigrant teenager.

== Bibliography ==
=== Novels ===
- Pakkis (1986)
- Evil Landscape (1990)

=== Movies ===
- Import Eksport (2005)
- Jan Jan Pakistan (1997)
- Dharkan (Heartbeat) (1994)
