= Seema Begum =

Pakistani film actress

- سیما بیگم
- Born: Shamim Kausar; Lahore
- Died: 21 April 2019; Lahore, Pakistan
- Occupation: Film actress
- Years active: 1964 – 2009

Seema Begum, mononymously known as Seema (died 21 April 2019), was a Pakistani film actress who played supporting roles in Urdu and Punjabi films from 1964 to 2009. She appeared in several notable films, including Heer Ranjha (1970), Sharafat (1974), Shabana (1976), and Maula Jat (1979).

== Career ==
Born in Lahore as Shamim Kausar, Seema started her film career in the Punjabi movie Laadli in 1964. She was befriended by the singer Naseem Begum, who took her to the filmmaker Shabab Kiranvi who was producing the film. In the first film, she was a heroine opposite the actor Habib. After that, she appeared in Mekhana, Eid Mubarak and many other films. During her 45-year career, she was mostly cast in supporting roles in both Urdu and Punjabi films.

Seema also directed a movie "Aag" in 1992, starring Reema and Shaan in the lead cast.

== Personal life ==
Seema was once married to someone from outside the cinema world, but divorced him shortly after. She didn't have any children.

== Last years and death ==
In 2009, Seema was injured in a car accident and was unable to walk due to a broken leg. In the later years of her life, she lived a life of poverty, loneliness, and disability. Eventually, she died in a coma on 21 April 2019 and was buried in the Gulberg graveyard, Lahore.

== Selected filmography ==
- Laadli (1964)
- Eid Mubarak (1965)
- Jaag Utha Insan (1966)
- Maan Baap (1967)
- Nadira (1967)
- Beraham (1967)
- Sangdil (1968)
- Shahansha-e-Jahangir (1968)
- Ishq Na Puche Zaat (1969)
- Lungotia (1969)
- Ansu Ban Gaye Moti (1970)
- Att Khuda Da Ver (1970)
- Dunya Matlab Di (1970)
- Heer Ranjha (1970)
- Ansoo (1971)
- Asu Bila (1971)
- Zulm Da Badla (1972)
- Heera Moti (1972)
- Daman Aur Chingari (1973)
- Jadoo (1974)
- Khatarnak (1974)
- Sharafat (1974)
- Masoom (1975)
- Bin Badal Barsaat (1975)
- Shabana (1976)
- Insan Aur Farishta (1976)
- Wahashi Jat (1975)
- Sargent (1977)
- Maula Jat (1979)
- Jat in London (1981)
- Teri Meri Ik Marzi (1984)
- Joora (1986)
