= Mahir ul Qadri =

Writer, poet and novelist

Mahirul Qadri
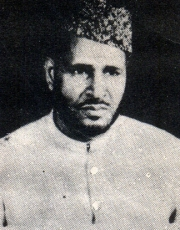
- Born: Manzoor Hussain; 30 July 1906; Pilibhit, Uttar Pradesh, British India
- Died: 12 May 1978 (aged 71)
- Writing career
- Language: Urdu, Hindi, Punjabi, English
- Genres: Writer, Poet

Mahirul Qadri (Urdu ماہر القادری), whose real name was Manzoor Hussain, was a Pakistani religious writer, poet, and novelist.

== Biography ==
He was born in village Kesar Kalan Tahsil Debai on 30 July 1906, in Bulandshahar district of Uttar Pradesh, British India. He studied at Aligarh Muslim University. In 1947 he migrated to Karachi, Pakistan. He affixed his poetic pen-name Mahir with Qadri due to his spiritual links with the Qadiriyya order of Sufism. He died while participating in a mushaira in Jeddah on 12 May 1978.

== Literary career ==
At the age of 13, he began his poetic career. His first ghazal was published in Bulandshahr Gazette in 1924. Later Mahir-ul-Qadri went to Hyderabad, Deccan, where for 10 years he held key literary positions. He was associated with men like Kishen Pershad Kaul and Nawab Moazzam Jah.

== Writings ==
Mahir Ul Qadri was a prolific Urdu poet, essayist, novelist, and literary journalist. His works span multiple genres including devotional poetry, spiritual prose, travel writing, and literary commentary. Many of his books are preserved online and continue to be read widely.

=== Poetry collections ===
- آتشِ خاموش ("Silent Fire") – A hallmark poetry collection capturing spiritual melancholy and existential longing.
- نعتیں فردوس کی ("Naats of Paradise") – Devotional verses in praise of the Islamic prophet Muhammad, filled with imagery of Jannah and divine beauty.
- جذباتِ ماہر ("Emotions of Mahir") – A poetic expression of love, sorrow, and social critique, written in an emotionally direct style.
- یادِ رفتگاں ("Remembrance of the Departed") – Poems honoring spiritual figures and departed souls.
- زخم و مرہم ("Wound and Cure") – Symbolic poetry on pain, healing, and divine providence.

=== Prose & Essays ===
- طلسمِ حیات ("Talisman of Life") – Philosophical reflections on the enigma of existence and man’s inner world.
- درِ یتیم ("Pearl of the Orphan") – A short story collection on moral dilemmas and Sufi ethics.
- شیرازہ ("Spine/Binder") – A mixed-genre collection of essays, literary commentary, and critical reflections.
- محسوساتِ ماہر ("Sensations of Mahir") – Autobiographical sketches and personal prose pieces.
- حرفِ دل ("Words of the Heart") – Introspective essays with a spiritual and literary tone.

=== Religious & Devotional Works ===
- کارواںِ حجاز ("Caravan to Hijaz") – A travelogue chronicling his pilgrimage to Makkah and Madinah, filled with emotional and spiritual insight.
- نعتیں فردوس کی ("Naats of Paradise") – A collection of lyrical praise poetry devoted to the Prophet.

=== Journals & Editorial Work ===
Mahir Ul Qadri served as the editor of the literary magazine Faran (فاران), one of the key publications of the Anjuman Taraqqī‑e‑Urdu during the 1950s and 60s. Through Faran, he published literary criticism, nationalistic essays, and profiles of poets and mystics.

Archived issues of Faran edited by Mahir Ul Qadri are available online:

- فاران، شمارہ 1960 – Includes essays by Qadri on Islamic identity, Iqbal, and literary reform.
- فاران، اپریل 1962 – Contains editorial reflections and thematic articles on Urdu poetry and prose.

His editorial work played a major role in shaping mid‑century Urdu literary culture in Pakistan, particularly by blending spiritual themes with literary nationalism.

== See also ==
- Muhammad Tahir-ul-Qadri
