= Aasia =

Pakistani film actress

Aasia Begum
- آسیہ بیگم
- Born: Firdous Begum; 13 November 1951; Patiala, Punjab, India
- Died: 9 March 2013 (aged 61); Long Island, New York, United States
- Occupation: Actress
- Years active: 1970–1991
- Children: 3
- Awards: 2 Nigar Awards

Aasia Begum, better known as simply Aasia, (13 November 1951 – 9 March 2013) was a Pakistani film actress who was active from the 1970s to the 1990s.

== Early life ==
Aasia was born in 1951 as Firdous in Patiala, Punjab, India, and later emigrated to Pakistan. After retiring from her career, she resided in New York, where she died on 9 March 2013, aged 60.

== Career ==
She made her debut in the Pakistani film industry in 1970 in a film by Shabab Kiranvi. In the same year, she also acted in director Riaz Shahid's movie Gharnata (1970). Aasia acted in more than 179 Punjabi, and several Urdu films. Aasia is best remembered for her role of 'Mukkho' in the Punjabi film Maula Jatt (1979). This role redefined the concept of 'Jatti' and 'Chaudhrani' in Pakistani Punjabi language films. In that film, she had based her Punjabi accent on the Sargodha and Jhang accents.

== Personal life ==
She married a Karachi-based businessman, and they had four children together.

== Death ==
Aasia quit the film industry in the mid-1990s, and had been residing in New York with her family. She had sought treatment for some health issue in 2011 at the Aga Khan University Hospital, Karachi and then returned to New York. She died on 9 March 2013 in New York aged 60, from undisclosed causes.

== Filmography ==
=== Film ===
Year	Film	Role	Notes
1970	Insaan Aur Aadmi		
1971	Raja Rani		Director and producer: Diljeet Mirza; in Punjabi
1971	Yaaden		
1971	Parai Aag		
1971	Gharnata		
1971	Charagh Kahan Roshni Kahan		
1971	Dil Aur Dunya		
1972	Main Akela		
1972	Main Bhi To Insan Hun		
1972	Punnu Di Sassi		
1972	Do Rangeelay		
1972	Pazeb		
1972	Umrao Jan Ada		
1973	Khoon Da Darya		
1973	Sheru		
1973	Mastana	Female lead	Director: Al-Hamid; Producers: Khalifa Khursheed Ahmad, Khalifa Sarwar Saeed; in Urdu
1973	Sehray Kay Phool		
1973	Chaar Khoon De Pyasay		
1973	Khuda Tay Maa		
1973	Beimaan		
1973	Daku Tay Insaan		
1973	Maa Tay Qanoon		
1973	Kehnday Nay Nainan		
1973	Ghairat Meray Veer Di		
1973	Jhalli		
1973	Jeera Blade	Azra	
1973	Khabardar		Director: Diljeet Mirza; Producer: Atta Ullah Bosan; in Punjabi
1973	Ghulam		
1974	Shehanshah		
1974	Khana day Khan Prohnay		Punjabi
1974	Pyar Hi Pyar		
1974	Tum Salamat Raho		Urdu
1974	Sasta Khoon Mehnga Pani	Rano	Punjabi
1974	Bhola Sajjan		
1974	Sikandra		Punjabi
1975	Khooni Khet		
1975	Haku		Punjabi
1975	Rawal		
1975	Khanzada		
1975	Sharif Badmash	Balil	Punjabi
1975	Sar-e-Aam		
1975	Hathkari		
1975	Sheeda Pastol	Najma	
1975	Doghla		
1975	Shoukan Melay Di		
1976	Mout Khed Jawana Di		
1976	Ajj Di Taza Khabar		
1976	Yaar Da Sehra		
1976	Akhar		
1976	Hukam Da Ghulam	Razia	
1976	Ultimatum		
1976	Toofan		Punjabi
1976	Chor Nu Mor		
1976	Jano Kapatti	Shanno	
1976	Anjaam		
1976	Kothay Tapni		
1976	Dukki Tikki		
1976	Mehboob Mera Mastana		
1976	Waada		
1976	Dara		
1976	Chitra Te Shera	Amina	
1976	Hashar Nashar		
1977	Dharti Lahu Mangdi		
1977	Dildar Sadqay		
1977	Aakhri Medan		
1977	April Fool		Urdu
1977	Fraud		Punjabi
1977	Lahori Badshah		
1977	Haji Khokhar		
1977	Sher Babbar		
1977	Qanoon		
1977	Pehli Nazar		
1977	BeGunah		
1977	Jeenay Ki Rah		
1977	Ghairat Di Mout		
1977	Baray Mian Deewanay		
1977	Baghi Tay Qanoon		
1977	Himmat		Punjabi
1977	Aakhri Goli		
1978	Nidarr		
1978	Wafadar		
1978	Elaan		Punjabi
1978	Bohat Khoob		
1978	Guarantee		
1978	Heera Tay Basheera		
1978	Prince		
1978	Ibrat		
1978	Jashan		
1978	Goga		Punjabi
1978	Puttar Phannay Khan Da		
1978	Ranga Daku		
1978	Boycott		Punjabi
1978	Lalkara		
1979	Notan Nu Salam		
1979	Maula Jatt	Mukkho Jatti	
1979	Chalaan		
1979	Muqabla		Punjabi
1979	Goga Sher		
1979	Attal Faisala		
1979	Do Jeedar		
1979	Hathiar		
1979	Makhan Khan		
1979	Aag		Urdu
1979	Jatt Da Kharak		
1979	Bakka Rath		
1979	Permit		
1979	Dada Pota		
1979	Ghunda Act		
1979	Wehshi Gujjar		
1980	Dushman Mera Yaar		
1980	Haseena Maan Jaye Gi		
1980	Do Toofaan		
1980	Yaar Dushman		
1980	Mann Mauji		
1980	Ladla Puttar		
1980	Behram Daku	Taji	
1981	Khan-e-Azam		
1981	Anokha Daaj		
1981	Athra Puttar	Lachhi	
1982	Ik Doli		
1982	Lalay Di Jan		Punjabi
1982	Medan		
1982	Bharia Mela		Punjabi
1983	Des Pardes	Rano	
1983	Nazra		
1984	Shanakhti Card		Punjabi
1984	Ilaqa Incharge		
1985	Angara		Directed and produced by Mohammad Ikram; in Punjabi
1986	Baghi Sipahi	Pareeto	Directed and produced by Fiaz Sheikh; in Punjabi
1986	Yeh Adam		
1989	Meri Hathjori		Directed by Masood Butt
1990	Dushmani		Punjabi
1991	Chann Meray		Punjabi

== Awards and honours ==
Year	Award	Category	Result	Title	Ref.
1977	Nigar Award	Best Actress	Won	Qanoon	
1979	Nigar Award	Best Supporting Actress	Won	Aag	

== See also ==
- List of Pakistani actresses
