= Kamal Ahmed (music director) =

Pakistani music director (1937 – 1997)

- کمال احمد
- Born: 20 April 1937; Gurgaon, Punjab Province, British India
- Died: 22 July 1997 (aged 60); Lahore, Pakistan
- Occupation: Film music director
- Years active: 1967 – 1997
- Awards: Won 6 Nigar Awards during his career

Kamal Ahmed (20 April 1937 – 22 July 1997) was a Pakistani film music director. He has the second-highest number of film scores of more than 100 Urdu movies, after M. Ashraf who did more than 250 Urdu movies as a music director. Kamal won 6 'Best Musician' Nigar Awards during his long film career.

== Early life ==
Kamal Ahmad was born in Gurgaon, Punjab Province, British India on 20 April 1937.

== Career ==
Kamal's debut film as a music director was Nadira (1967). In this movie, he composed music along with his music teacher Rehman Verma. He got his first breakthrough with the movie Rangeela (1970) in which his composed song, "Ga More Munwa Gaata Ja Re" became popular.

In film, Tere Mere Sapnay (1975), Kemal used the voices of Naheed Akhtar, Rubina Badar, Mehdi Hassan and Masood Rana for songs, "Mujhe Teri Najarya Ne", "Kabhi Tou Rukh Se Uthe Ga", "Tere Ghar Doli Le Ke", "Main Ho Gaee Dil Dar Ki", "Bhaven Hove Laraee", "Koi Mujhe Kehta Hai", "Sab Kuch Khuda Se", and "Main Tau Na Boli".

In 1971, he gave music for film Dil Aur Duniya with popular melody "Champa Aur Chambeli Yeh Kaliyan Nai Naveli", vocalized by Runa Laila.

Mutthi Bhar Chawal (1977) was Kamal's another musical venture. It had melodious songs like, "Aao Seenay Say Lag Kay Mar Jayen", sung by Mehnaz and Mehdi Hassan, "Ho Mera Pagla Mann Lehray" sung by Mehnaz. For Ishq Ishq (1977), he composed melodies like, "Ishq Sacha Hay Tou Phir Waada Nibhana Hoga" and "Naina Re Naina" both sung by Mehdi Hassan. His next notable film was Salakhain that was released on 23 December 1977. Its popular song "Teray Meray Pyar Ka Aisa Nata" was sung by Mehnaz and Mehdi Hassan.
Some other famous film scores of Kamal include, 'Sar Kata Insan', 'Mr 420', 'Aandhi', 'Nangi Talwar', 'Shehnshah', 'Yeh Kese Hua', 'Khan Dost', 'Accident', 'Bohat Khoob', 'Parakh', 'Aakhri Muqabala', 'Chor Sipahi', 'Ishq Ishq', 'Faraad', 'Warrant', 'Dekha Jaega', 'Shoukan Mele Di', 'Bashira', 'Meri Muhabbat Tere Hawale', 'Mujram Kaun' (1970), 'Dil Aur Duniya', 'Rangila' and Diya Aur Toofan (1969 film).
His last Urdu film, Mazboot, was released in 1993.

== Popular compositions ==
- "Ga more munwa gaata ja re" ... Singer: Rangeela, Movie: Diya Aur Toofan (1969 film)
- "Kis ne tora hai dil hazoor ka" ... Singer: Mala, Movie: Rangeela (1970)
- Honton Pe Tabassum, Nazar Sehmi Sehmi, Ho Gaye Re Mujhe Kyun Ghalat Fehmi ... Singers Ahmed Rushdi and Mala Begum, lyrics by Mushir Kazmi, film Mujrim Kaun (1970)
- "Champa aur chambeli ye kaliyan nai naveeli" ... Singer: Runa Laila, Movie: Dil Aur Duniya (1971)
- "Ga mere dewane dil es duniya se kiya hasil" ... Singer: Mehdi Hassan, Movie: Daulat Aur Duniya (1972)
- Aaj Gham Hai Tau Kia Hai, Woh Din Bhi Zaroor Aaye Ga... Singer: Masood Rana, Movie: Mastana (1973)
- "Bheegi bheegi raat mein yonhi baat baat mein" ... Singer:Mehdi Hassan, Movie: Wada (1976)
- "Chahay humein tum thukra do ya apna bana lo" ... Singer: Noor Jehan, Movie: Wada (1976)
- "Yonhi chalte chalte raahon mein mujhe tum mil gaye" ... Singers: Mehdi Hassan/Mehnaz, Movie: Andaata (1976)
- "Ishq sacha hai to phir wada nibhana hoga" ... Singers: Mehdi Hassan/Mehnaz, Movie: Ishq Ishq (1977)
- "Tere mere piyar ka aisa naata hai" ... Singer: Mehdi Hassan/Mehnaz, Movie: Salakhein (1977)
- "Taqdeer ke hathon mein khilona hai aadmi" ... Singer: Akhlaq Ahmed, Movie: Aadmi (1978)
- "Aaj tu ghair sahi" ... Singer: Mehdi Hassan, Movie: Dehleez (1983)
- "Do nainon ka hai kaam sara" ... Singers: Mehdi Hassan/Nahid Akhtar
- "Khilonay teri zindagi kaya" ... Singer: Akhlaq Ahmed, Movie: Kundan (1987)

== Awards ==
Kamal won 6 Best Musician Nigar Awards for the following films:

- Ishq Nichaway Gali Gali (Punjabi) (1984)
- Jeenay Nahin Doon Gi (Urdu) (1985)
- Kundan (Urdu) (1987)
- Aasman (Urdu) (1990)
- Aandhi (Urdu) (1991)
- Aaj Ka Dour (Urdu) (1992)

== Death ==
Kamal Ahmed died on 22 July 1997, in Lahore, Pakistan.
