= Sharika =

Sharika is a feminine African and Indian given name. Notable people with the name include:

- Sharika Nelvis (born 1990), African-American hurdler
- Sharika Thiranagama (born 1980), Sinhalese anthropologist
