= Shaukat Ali (singer) =

Pakistani singer (1944–2021)

- Born: 3 May 1944; Malakwal, Punjab, British India
- Died: 2 April 2021 (aged 76); Lahore, Punjab, Pakistan
- Occupations: Folk singer Playback singer
- Years active: 1960 – 2021
- Awards: Pride of Performance Award by the President of Pakistan in 1990

Shaukat Ali, also known as Shaukat Ali Khan, (3 May 1944 – 2 April 2021) was a Pakistani folk singer.

== Early life and career ==
Born on 3 May 1944, into a family of artists in Malakwal, a town then in Gujrat District (now in new District Mandi Bahauddin), Shaukat Ali began singing while at college in the 1960s, receiving help from his elder brother Inayat Ali Khan. He was introduced into the Pakistani film world as a playback singer by the renowned film music director M. Ashraf in the Punjabi film Tees Maar Khan (1963).

From the late 1960s, he performed ghazals and Punjabi folk songs. As a folk singer, he was popular not only in Pakistani Punjab but also in the Indian part of the Punjab region. Shaukat Ali also toured and performed overseas wherever there were significant population centers of Punjabi immigrants, such as the UK, Canada and the US.

Shaukat Ali was known for singing Sufi poetry with great vigor and a wide vocal range, for example Heer Waris Shah and Saif ul Maluk.

Shaukat Ali received the 'Voice of Punjab' award in 1976. In July 2013, he was honored with the 'Pride of Punjab' award by the Pakistan Institute of Language, Art and Culture (PILAC). He gave a live performance at the 1982 Asian Games in New Delhi, and was awarded the highest Pakistani civilian Presidential award Pride of Performance in 1990. His song "Kadi Te Hass Bol Vey" was used in the 2009 Indian movie Love Aaj Kal. He also released a track titled "Jagga". Shaukat Ali also performed at the All Pakistan Music Conference events and frequently appeared on Pakistani television shows.

He is the father of Pakistani singers Imran Shaukat Ali, Ameer Shaukat Ali and Mohsin Shaukat Ali.

== Documentary on his life ==
In 2017, a Canadian company with the help of his son Mohsin Shaukat Ali, produced a one-hour documentary to commemorate his contributions to the Pakistani music industry. This documentary shows the struggles Shaukat Ali faced throughout his career and also includes some of his past performances as well as interviews with many contemporary singers, including Lata Mangeshkar. It documents his journey from a young aspiring singer who later became a popular folk singer of Pakistan.

== Songs ==
- "Saif-ul-Malook--Awwal Hamd Sana-e-Elahi", sung by Shaukat Ali, lyrics by Sufi poet Mian Muhammad Bakhsh, music by Wajahat Attre, film Chan Varyam (1981)
- "Sathio Mujahido, Jaag Uthha Hai Sara Watan", a 'Qaumi Naghma' song, sung by Shaukat Ali, Masood Rana, lyrics by Himayat Ali Shair, music by Khalil Ahmed, film Mujahid (1965)
- "Mein Puttar Pakistan Da", sung by Shaukat Ali, Inayat Hussain Bhatti, Naheed Akhtar, lyrics by Hazeen Qadri and music by Wajahat Attre, film Athra Puttar (1981)
- "Nabi Dey Ghulam Asseen", sung by Shaukat Ali, lyrics by Sahil Siddiqi, music by Salim Iqbal, film Behram Daku (1980)
- "Ae Tay Wailea Aap Dessay Ga, Kaun Maarda Ae Maidan Pei Nay Hullay", sung by Alam Lohar, Shaukat Ali, lyrics by Nasim Fazal and music by Master Inayat Hussain, film Maula Jat (1979)
- "Mein Walait Kahnu Aa Gaya", sung by Shaukat Ali, lyrics by Taslim Fazli, music by M Ashraf, film Playboy (1978)
- "Lal Meri Patt Rakhio Bala, Jhoolay Lalan Dey", a traditional folk song, sung by Noor Jehan, Shaukat Ali, Masood Rana, Ahmed Rushdi, Ghulam Ali, Pervez Mehdi, music by Nashad, film Parchhaen (1974)
- "Har Dam Yahi Mere Lab Pe Sada Hai, Murshid Mera Nadir Ali Shah Hai", a devotional Sufi song or Qawwali sung by Shaukat Ali (1975)
- "Tu Wi Haq Da Wali", a devotional Sufi song or Qawwali sung by Shaukat Ali (1975)
- "Saaday Yaar Nay Banh Laiy Sehray", sung by Shaukat Ali, Inayat Hussain Bhatti, lyrics by Khawaja Pervez, music by Ustad Tafu, film Charhda Suraj (1982)
- "Teri Meri Aey Azlaan Di Yaari", a bhangra song sung by Shaukat Ali and Mehnaz Begum, lyrics by Saeed Gillani, music by Kamal Ahmad, film Angara (1985)

Shaukat Ali's folk song hits include "Kyun Door Door Reindey Au", "Kaddi Te Hass Bol Vey", "Jab Bahaar Aaii Tau Sehra Ki Taraf Chal Para", and many Punjabi folk songs including "Chhalla", "Jagga", "Kanwan, Maan Jannat Da Parchaavan".

== Awards and recognition ==
- Pride of Performance Award in 1990 by the President of Pakistan
- Pride of Punjab Award by the Pakistan Institute of Language, Art and Culture (PILAC).

== Death ==
Shaukat Ali died on 2 April 2021 at CMH Lahore where he was getting treatment for liver failure. His funeral prayers were offered (2 April 2021) between Maghrib and Isha at Samsani Johar Town in Lahore.
