= Mustafa Qureshi =

Pakistani film and television actor (born 1938)

- ﻣﺼﻄﻔﯽٰ قریشی
- Born: 11 May 1938 (age 88); Hyderabad, Sind, British India (now Pakistan)
- Occupation: Actor
- Years active: 1957–present
- Known for: Playing Noori Natt
- Works: Filmography
- Political party: PTI (2018-present)
- Spouse: Rubina Qureshi (died 2022)
- Children: Aamir Qureshi (actor-singer)
- Awards: Nigar Awards in 1979, 1981 and 1983
- Honours: Pride of Performance Award in 1988

Mustafa Qureshi (born 11 May 1938) is a Pakistani film and television actor.

He has acted in more than 600 movies, in Urdu, Punjabi and Sindhi languages.

He is best remembered for playing the antagonist Noori Natt in Maula Jatt (1979).

He was born into a Sindhi family despite his later work mainly being in Punjabi cinema.

Qureshi won Nigar Award for Best Supporting Actor for his performance in Lal Aandhi (1979). He then won his first Nigar Award for Best Actor for the 1981 film Sher Khan. He won his third Nigar Award and second in best actor category for his role in Rustam Te Khan (1983).

He was awarded Pride of Performance in 1988.

He has voiced Germander in the Commander Safeguard animated series.

== Early life and career ==
Qureshi was born in Hyderabad, Sindh, on 11 May 1938, and received primary education in Hyderabad, combining both modern and religious studies, later on gaining a Master of Arts degree in Islamic history from Sindh University, being particularly influenced by the scholars Imdad Ali Imam Ali Kazi and Ali Muhammad Rashidi, while after his graduation he began his professional career as a host on Radio Pakistan's Sindhi programme Assan Jo Pakistan (Sindhi: اسان جو پاڪستان; "Our Pakistan"), in 1957.

One day he went to see the shooting of the film Aag Ka Darya (1966) and was spotted by cameraman and future film director Raza Mir, who asked him to act as a villain in his upcoming film, Lakhon Mein Aik (1967). Qureshi initially could not see himself becoming an actor, so he had to be convinced by Mir. Eventually Qureshi agreed to do the film, which became a box-office hit. As of 2016, his film career has spanned 45 years.

== Personal life ==
=== Family ===
He met his wife Rubina Qureshi (d. 2022), a Sindhi folk singer, while both were working for Radio Pakistan, as she was a prominent singer who "sang about 10,000 songs and the total recording time of her songs was more than 50 hours."

Actor and musician Aamir Qureshi is their son.

=== Politics ===
Having been associated with the Pakistan Peoples' Party since he met Zulfiqar Ali Bhutto, describing himself as an "ideological worker" and at one point even becoming head of PPP’s culture wing, over the decades, like many Bhutto loyalists, he eventually became disillusioned with how the party evolved, and has since 2018 been associated with Imran Khan's Pakistan Tehreek-e-Insaf.

== Selected filmography ==
Notable films

- Lakhon Mein Aik (1967). Mustafa Qureshi's debut film. He was introduced in this film by film director Raza Mir.
- Andleeb (1969)
- Khatarnak (1974). The movie which launched him as a major villain.
- Toofan (1976)
- Zindagi (1978)
- Maula Jatt (1979)
- Lal Aandhi (1979)
- Ghulami (1985)
- Jeeva (1995)
- Sargam (1995)
- Chief Sahib (1996)
- Zill-e-Shah (2008)
- Shareeka (2012)
- Sultanat (2014)
- Shor Sharaba (2018)
- Tere Bajre Di Rakhi (2022)

== Awards and recognition ==
- Pride of Performance Award in 1988 by the President of Pakistan

=== Nigar Awards ===
- Won – Nigar Award for Best Supporting Actor – Lal Aandhi (1979)
- Won – Nigar Award for Best Supporting Actor – Sher Khan (1981)
- Won – Nigar Award for Best Supporting Actor – Rustam Te Khan (1983)
