= List of Pakistani films =

This is a chronological list of lists of films produced in Pakistan by year of release and language.

== By language ==
- List of Pakistani Bengali films
- List of Urdu films
- List of Pashto-language films
- List of Pakistani Punjabi-language films
- List of Sindhi-language films

== Pre-1950 ==
- List of Pakistani films before 1950

== 1950–1999 ==
- 1950
- 1951
- 1952
- 1953
- 1954
- 1955
- 1956
- 1957
- 1958
- 1959
- 1960
- 1961
- 1962
- 1963
- 1964
- 1965
- 1966
- 1967
- 1968
- 1969
- 1970
- 1971
- 1972
- 1973
- 1974
- 1975
- 1976
- 1977
- 1978
- 1979
- 1980
- 1981
- 1982
- 1983
- 1984
- 1985
- 1986
- 1987
- 1988
- 1989
- 1990
- 1991
- 1992
- 1993
- 1994
- 1995
- 1996
- 1997
- 1998
- 1999

== 21st century ==
- 2000
- 2001
- 2002
- 2003
- 2004
- 2005
- 2006
- 2007
- 2008
- 2009
- 2010
- 2011
- 2012
- 2013
- 2014
- 2015
- 2016
- 2017
- 2018
- 2019
- 2020
- 2021
- 2022
- 2023
- 2024
- 2025
- 2026

== See also ==
- Cinema of Pakistan
- List of Pakistani Punjabi-language films
- List of Pashto-language films
- List of Sindhi-language films
- List of Pakistani animated films
- List of highest-grossing Pakistani films
- List of highest-grossing films in Pakistan
- List of years in Pakistan
- List of years in Pakistani television
