= List of Pakistani films of 1960 =

A list of films produced in Pakistan in 1960 (see 1960 in film) and in the Urdu language:

== 1960 ==
Title	Director	Cast	Notes
1960
Aik Thi Maa		Nayyar Sultana, Bahar, Sudhir, Nazar	
Aladdin Ka Beta		Neelo, Ratan Kumar, Saqi, Nasira, Lehri	
Asiya	Fateh Lohani	Sumita Devi, Kazi Khaliq, Ranen Kushad, Shahid	The film won the Presidents Award for the year. The Music director was Abbasuddin Ahmed. Shabnam played as the child artist in the film
Aur Bhi Gham Hain		Jamila, Jaffrey, Neelma, Talish, Agha Jan	
Ayaz	Luqman	Nayyar Sultana, Neelo, Sabiha Khanum, Syed Kamal, Habib, Shahnawaz	
Bhabhi		Shamim Ara, Aslam Pervaiz, Yasmeen, Zarif	
Clerk		Khalil Qaisar, Musarrat Nazir, Ratan Kumar, Saqi	
Daku Ki Ladki		Musarrat Nazir, Ejaz Durrani, Nayyar, Allauddin	
Dil-e-Nadan		Musarrat Nazir, Syed Kamal, Shahnawaz, S. Gul, Laila	
Do Ustad		Shamim Ara, Ilyas, Ratan Kumar, Amy Minwala	
Ghareeb		Rukhsana, Salim Nigar, Emmy, Shahina	
Gulbadan		Musarrat Nazir, Ejaz Durrani, Nasira, Sheikh Iqbal	
Hamsafar		Yasmeen, Aslam Pervaiz, Jaffrey, Nazar, Nighat	
Insaaf		Neelo, Syed Kamal, Lehri, M. Ismail	
Izzat		Shamim Ara, Ejaz Durrani, Saqi, Laila, Habib	
Khyber Mail		Neelo, Aslam Pervaiz, Nayyar Sultana, Nasira, Talish	
Khan Bhahadur		Musarrat Nazir, Laila, Kamal, Ajmal	
Laggan	Rahim Gul	Husna, Aslam Pervaiz, Bahar, Yusuf	
Manzil		Neelo, Ejaz Durrani, Laila, Aslam Pervaiz, Nazar	
Neelofar		Neelo, Ratan Kumar, Nasira, Jaffri	
Naukri		Musarrat Nazir, Darpan, Lehri, Asha Posley	
Rahguzar	Zia Sarhadi	Sabiha Khanum, Aslam Pervaiz, Talish, Nayyar Sultana	
Raat Ke Rahi	Iqbal Yousuf	Rehana, Darpan, Shamim Ara, Talish	
Roopmati Baaz Bahadur		Shamim Ara, Aslam Pervaiz, Salim Raza, Talish	
Saheli	S. M. Yousuf	Shamim Ara, Darpan, Aslam Pervaiz, Nayyar Sultana	
Sahil		Shimmi, Sudhir, Talish, Nazar, Allauddin	
Salma	Ashfaq Malik	Bahar, Ejaz Durrani, Allauddin, Yasmeen	
Shaam Dhalay	Santosh Kumar	Sabiha Khanum, Santosh Kumar, Nazar, Ruskhsana	
Shahbaz		Yasmeen, Aslam Pervaiz, Amy Minwala, Diljeet, Nighat	
Shehzadi		Neelo, Aslam Pervaiz, Emmy, Rakhshi, Sharara	
Street No. 77		Musarrat Nazir, Habib, Neelo, S. Gul, Sharara	
Sultanat		Sabiha Khanum, Santosh Kumar, Husna, Nazar, Ilyas	
Watan	Anwar Kamal Pasha	Musarrat Nazir, Syed Kamal, Ejaz Durrani, Bahar	
Yeh Duniya		Jamila, Talish, Lehri, Rukhsana, Aqil	
Zanjeer		Ragni, Masud, Azad, Fauzia, Nazar	

== See also ==
- 1960 in Pakistan
