= List of Pakistani films of 1959 =

A list of films produced in Pakistan in 1959 (see 1959 in film) and in the Urdu language:

== 1959 ==
Title	Director	Cast	Notes
1959
Aaj Kal	Munawar H. Qasim	Sabiha Khanum, Syed Kamal, Bibbo, Rakshi, Abbas Nausha	
Akash Aar Mati	Fateh Lohani	Amin, Prabir Kumar, Sumita Devi	
Alam Ara	Daud Chand	Shamim Ara, Ilyas, Akmal, Ghulam Mohammed	
Apna Paraya	Rafiq Rizvi	Shamim Ara, Syed Kamal, Rukhsana, Yousuf Khan	
Faisla	Jafar Bukhari	Shamim Ara, Yousuf Khan, Jamila Razzaq, Lehri	
Gulshan	Jafar Malik	Meena Shorey, Sudhir, Aslam Pervaiz, Allauddin	
Gumrah	Anwar Kamal Pasha	Kafira, Habib, Mahrukh, Ejaz Durrani	
Himmat	Amin Malik	Bahar, Aslam Pervaiz, Azad, Nazar, Shahnawaz	
Jago Hua Severa	A. J. Kardar	Tarampati Mitra, Anis, Zoreen, Rakshi	First Dhaka-based Urdu film
Jhoomer	Masud Pervaiz	Musarrat Nazir, Allauddin, Naeem Hashmi, Sudhir	
Khul Ja Sim Sim	Saqlain Razvi	Yasmeen, Darpan, Nazar, Zeenat	
Koel	Masud Pervaiz	Noor Jehan, Aslam Pervaiz, Neelo, Allauddin	Music by Khurshid Anwar
Lalkaar	T.H. Riaz	Neelo, Yasmeen, S. Gul, Nayyar Sultana, Ajmal, Shahnawaz, Rekha	
Matir Pahar	Mohiuddin	Sumita Devi	
Mazloom	Aslam Irani	Nayyar Sultana, Aslam Pervaiz, Akmal, Shamim Ara	
Muskurahat	N.E. Akhtar	Sabiha Khanum, Santosh Kumar, Aslam Pervaiz, M. Ismail	
Naghma-e-Dil	Najam Naqvi	Sabiha Khanum, Santosh Kumar, Naeem Hashmi	
Nagin	Khalil Qaisar	Neelo, Ratan Kumar, Saqi, Yousuf Khan	
Neend	Hassan Tariq	Noor Jehan, Aslam Pervaiz, Neelo, Diljit	Music by Rasheed Attre
Raaz	Humayun Mirza	Musarrat Nazir, Ejaz Durrani, Shamim Ara, Allauddin	
Saathi	Al-Hamid	Neelo, Darpan, Talish, Husna, Nazar	
Sahara	A. Rauf	Musarrat Nazir, Darpan, Diljit, Zeenat	
Savera	Rafiq Rizvi	Shamim Ara, Syed Kamal, Rukhsana, Sikander	
Shama	Nazir Ahmed Khan	Swaran Lata, Nazir Ahmed Khan, Neelo, Darpan	
Society	M.A. Khan	Musarrat Nazir, Sudhir, Zeenat, Husna	
Sola Aaney		Neelo, Musarrat Nazir, Ejaz Durrani, Zahur Shah	
Tere Baghair	Murtaza Jeelani	Sabiha Khanum, Santosh Kumar, Allauddin, Lehri	

== See also ==
- 1959 in Pakistan
