= List of Pakistani films of 1964 =

A list of films produced in Pakistan in 1964 (see 1964 in film) and in the Urdu language:

== 1964 ==
Title	Director	Cast	Notes
1964
Aashiana	S. M. Yusuf	Zeba, Syed Kamal, Asha, Habib, Rukhsana	
Andhi Muhabbat		Laila, Akmal Khan, Mina, Talish	
Aurat Ka Pyar		Rani, Allauddin, Mohammad Ali, Nasira	
Azad		Bahar, Santosh, Asad, Ajmal	
Baap Ka Baap		Shamim Ara, Darpan, Nazar, Ilyas	
Baghi Sipahi		Zeba, Sudhir, Naghma, Asad Bokhari	
Bandhan	Qazi Zaheer	Chitra, Mustafa, Rosy, Anwar Hussain	East Pakistan
Bees Din		Rani, Mohammad Ali, Kamal Irani, Adeeb	
Beti		Neelo, Ejaz Durrani, Bibi Guddo, Nasira	
Chingari	Khurshid Anwar	Shamim Ara, Santosh, Deeba, Ejaz Durrani	
Choti Ammi		Rani, Ratan Kumar, Kumar, Lehri	
Choti Behan		Rani, Syed Kamal, Mohammad Ali, Nirala	
Deewana		Sabiha Khanum, Ejaz Durrani, Deeba, Habib	
Eik Dil Do Dewaane		Rani, Syed Kamal, Zeenat, Saqi	
Farangi	K. Qaisar	Shamim Ara, Sudhir, Talish, Allauddin	
Gehra Daagh		Neelo, Ejaz Durrani, Talish, Ragni, Saqi, Allauddin	
Ghadaar		Saloni, Sudhir, Firdaus, Mohammad Ali	
Haveli	Khalil Qaisar	Shamim Ara, Talish, Santosh	
Head Constable		Zeba, Mohammad Ali, Habib, Yasmeen, Kumar	
Heera Aur Pathar	Pervez Malik	Zeba, Waheed Murad, Kamal Irani, Nirala, Ibrahim Nafees	
Inspector		Naghma, Nazar, Panna, Farida, Azad	
Ishrat		Sabiha Khanum, Santosh, Allauddin, Ilyas	
Jamila		Sabira, Habib, Zeenat, M. Ismael	
Jhalak		Laila, Syed Kamal, Panna, Allauddin, Amy	
Karwan	S. M. Parvez	Shabnam, Haroon, Tarana, Badarudin	East Pakistan
Khamosh Raho		Deeba, Mohammad Ali, Yusuf, Meena Shorey	
Khandan		Bahar, Mohammad Ali, Firdaus, Akmal Khan	
Khyber Pass		Neelo, Sudhir, Rukhsana, Nazar	
Lunda Bazar		Bahar, Asad, Asif Jah, Talish	
Lutera		Bahar, Aslam Pervaiz, Talish, Azad	
Maa Ka Pyaar		Sabira, Habib, Rukhsana, Adeeb	
Maalan	Q. Pasha	Nasima Khan, Deep, Dear Asghar, Jalil Afghani	East Pakistan
Maihkhana		Hanif, Shamim Ara, Habib, Rukhsana	
Mamta	Saqlain Rizvi	Bahar, Habib, Yasmeen, Waheed Murad	
Milan	Rahman	Deeba, Rehman, Akbar, Subhash Dutta	East Pakistan
Nehle Pe Dehla		Neelo, Syed Kamal, Nasira, Sawan, Saqi	
Paigham		Shamim Ara, Sultan, Rukhsana, Zeenat	
Paisay	Mustafiz	Shabnam, Azim, Subhash Dutta, Shaukat Akbar	East Pakistan
Phool Aur Kante		Saba, Habib, Tarana, Meena, Saqi	
Pyaar Ki Saza		Shamim Ara, Syed Kamal, Rukhsana, Nasira	
Pyaar Na Karna Nadan		Nighat, Rukshana, Talish, Saqi, Baqar Rizvi	
Safaid Khoon	A. Kamal Pasha	Rani, Santosh, Mohammad Ali, Asif Jah	
Sangam	Zahir Raihan	Rosy, Haroon, Sumita, Khalil	East Pakistan; first colour film released in Pakistan
Shaadi	Q. Pasha	Chitra, Deep, Nasima Khan, Jalil Afghani	East Pakistan
Shabab		Shamim Ara, Darpan, Deeba, Talish, Nazar	
Shatranj		Rani, Habib, Saqi, Sikander	
Shikari		Shamim Ara, Darpan, Rukhsana, Asif Jah	
Shukriya		Rukhsana, Habib, Sabira, Allauddin	
Tanha	Baby Islam	Shamim Ara, Haroon, Sh. Hasan, Naina	East Pakistan
Tauba	S. A. Hafiz	Zeba, Kamal Irani, Lehri, Kumar, Talish	
Wah Bhai Wah		Laila, Akmal Khan, Yusuf, Ajmal	
Yeh Bhi Ek Kahani	S. M. Shafi	Chitra, Haroon, Hina, Badarudin, Misbahudin	East Pakistan

== See also ==
- 1964 in Pakistan
