= List of Pakistani films of 1962 =

A list of Pakistani films produced in 1962 (see 1962 in film) and in the Urdu language:

== 1962 ==
Title	Director	Cast	Notes
1962
Aanchal	Al Hamid	Shamim Ara, Darpan, Talish, Saba	
Ajnabi		Bahar, Ejaz Durrani, Diljit, Asad Bokhari	
Aulad	S. M. Yusuf	Habib, Nayyar Sultana, Rehana, Waheed Murad	
Awaz De Kahan Hai		Yasmeen, Akmal, Talish, Ghulam Mohammed	
Azra	Munshi Dil	Neelo, Ejaz Durrani, Nazar, Allauddin	
Banjaran	Hassan Tariq	Neelo, Kamal, Allauddin, Azad, Ibrahim Nafees	
Barsat Main		Neelo, Ejaz Durrani, Nayyar Sultana, Aslam Pervaiz, Allauddin	
Beta		Husna, Aslam Pervaiz, Liala, Rajni	
Bulbul-e-Baghdad		Laila, Kamal, Nazar, Nasira, Panna	
Chanda	Ehtesham	Sultana Zaman, Shabnam, Rahman, Subhash Dutta	First Urdu-language film from East Pakistan
Chiragh Jalta Raha	Fazal Karim Fazli	Zeba, Arif, Deeba, Mohammad Ali, K. Irani, Shakir	
Dal Me Kala		Bahar, Kamal, Mohammad Ali, Faizi, Adeeb, Nirala	
Darwaza	S. Saif	Neelo, Yousuf Khan, Laila, Nazar, Talish	
Dosheeza		Neelo, Ejaz Durrani, Deeba, Lehri, Aslam Pervaiz	
Eik Manzil Do Rahain		Musarrat Nazir, Husna, Aslam Pervaiz, Saqi, Panna	
Ghunghat	Khurshid Anwar	Nayyar Sultana, Santosh Kumar, Talish, Laila, Neelo	Music by Khurshid Anwar
Husn-o-Ishq		Neelo, Ratan Kumar, Ragni, Himaliyawalla	
Inqilaab		Jamila, Habib, Shamim Ara, Rashdi	
Mehboob	Anwar Kamal Pasha	Shamim Ara, Yousuf Khan, Habib, Rani	
Mehtaab	Shabab Kiranvi	Nayyar Sultana, Habib, Zeenat, Asad, Allauddin	
Mera Kya Qusoor		Shamim Ara, Asad Bokhari, Master Mushtaq, Zeenat	
Mauseeqar	Qadir Ghori	Sabiha Khanum, Santosh Kumar, Meena Shorey	
Qaidi	Najam Naqvi	Shamim Ara, Darpan, Talish, Nazar	
Shaheed	Khalil Qaisar	Musarrat Nazir, Ejaz Durrani, Allauddin, Talish	Music by Rasheed Attre
Shake Hand		Nayyar Sultana, Allauddin, Talish	
Sukh Ka Sapna		Laila, Yusuf, Yasmeen, Talish	
Suraj Mukhi		Bahar, Aslam Pervaiz, Rukhsana, Asif Jah	
Susraal	Riaz Shahid	Laila, Rukhsana, Yousuf Khan, Allauddin	Music by Hassan Latif
Unchay Mehal		Neelo, Husna, Aslam Pervaiz, Emmy, Diljit	
Zarina		Husna, Yousuf Khan, Habib, Nazar	

== See also ==
- 1962 in Pakistan
