= List of Pakistani films of 1966 =

A list of films produced in Pakistan in 1966 (see 1966 in film) and in the Urdu language:

== 1966 ==
Title	Director	Cast	Notes
1966
Aag Ka Darya	Humayun Mirza	Shamim Ara, Mohammed Ali, Lehri, Jaffrey, Saqi	
Adil		Saloni, Mohammed Ali, Sabira Sultana, Razia, Adeeb	
Aina	Shabab Keranwi	Deeba, Mohammed Ali, Kamal Irani, Zeenat	
Akele Na Jana		Sofia, Hanif, Mohammed Ali, Rozina	
Al-Hilal		Husna, Darpan, Yusuf, Zamarrud	
Armaan	Pervez Malik	Zeba, Waheed Murad, Nirala, Rozina, Tarannum	
Azaadi Ya Mout		Hanif, Sofia Bano, Rozina	
Badnaam	Iqbal Shehzad	Neelo, Ejaz Durrani, Allauddin, Nabila, Jaffrey	
Baghi Sardar		Saloni, Mohammed Ali, Adeeb, Zahur Raja	
Begana	S. M. Parvez	Shabnam, Khalil, Nasima Khan, Mustafa	East Pakistan
Bhai Jaan		Mohammed Ali, Rani, Asad, Zeenat	
Bhayia	Kazi Zaheer	Chitra, Waheed Murad, Akbar, Anwer Hussain	East Pakistan
Dard-e-Dil		Zeba, Kamal, Talat Siddiqui, Azad	
Ghar Ka Ujala		Rani, Habib, Mohammed Ali, Firdaus, Saqi	
Ghar Ki Laaj		Attiya, Naushad, Waris, Afshan	
Hamrahi	Raja Hafeez	Khalid, Hyder, Hina, M. Zareff, Santosh	
Honhaar	S. M. Yusuf	Rukhsana, Waheed Murad, Shakil, Seema	
Hum Dono		Deeba, Kamal, Nirala, Kumar, K. Irani	
Husn Ka Chor		Deeba, Habib, Adeeb, Saqi	
Indhan		Rahman, Reshma, Mustafa	
Inssan		Rani, Sabira Sultana, Santosh, Allauddin	
Jaag Utha Insan		Zeba, Mohammed Ali, Waheed Murad, K. Irani, Firdaus, Ibrahim Nafees	
Jalwah	Younis Rahi	Shamim Ara, Rukhsana, Ejaz Durrani, Darpan	
Jan Baaz		Shirin, Mohammed Ali, Saloni, Talish	
Joker		Rani, Kamal, Zeba, Lehri, Talish	
Josh		Zeba, Sudhir, Waheed Murad, Hanif, Rukhsana, Jaffery	
Koan Kissi Ka		Kamal, Talat Siddiqui, Husna, Azad, Lehri	
Kohinoor		Sudhir, Zeba, Allauddin, Saloni	
Lori	Hamayet Ali Shair	Mohammed Ali, Zeba, Santosh, Saloni, Talat Siddiqui	
Maa, Bahu Beta		Yasmeen, Husna, Santosh, Zamarrud	
Madare Watan	Saifudin Saif	Deeba, Mohammad Ali, Zeenat Begum, Naeem Hashmi	
Main Chup Rahongi		Naghma, Habib, Asad, Seema	
Majboor	Hassan Tariq	Shamim Ara, Santosh, Husna, Jugno, Rehka	
Maujiza		Deeba, Habib, Darpan, Talat Siddiqui	
Mera Salam		Santosh, Sabira Sultana, Azad, baby Najma	
Mere Mehboob	Al-Hamid	Shamim Ara, Darpan, Azad, Nazar, Rajni	
Misaal	Rahim Gul	Yusuf, Hina, Hanif, Nabila	
Naghma-e-Sehra		Neelo, Mohammed Ali, Sudhir, Allauddin, Saqi	
Parda		Shamim Ara, Habib, Saqi, Gulrukh	
Parwana	Kamal Ahmed	Nasima Khan, Hassan Imam, Sujata	East Pakistan
Payal Ki Jhankar	Najm Naqvi	Neelo, Darpan, Deeba, Nazar, Aslam Pervaiz	
Phir Milinge Hum Dono	Shamsul Haq	Nazneen, Mustafa, Subhash Dutta, Anwera	East Pakistan
Poonam Ki Raat	Khalil Ahmed	Rosy, Akbar, Mehfouz, Sadhana	East Pakistan
Qabila		Shamim Ara, Sudhir, Saloni, Tarana	
Ruswai		Deeba, Habib, Talish, Lehri	
Sarhad	Masud Pervaiz	Husna, Ejaz Durrani, Allauddin, Saloni	
Sawaal	Hassan Tariq	Sabiha, Santosh, Saloni, Ejaz Durrani	
Taqdeer	Hassan Tariq	Husna, Santosh, Lehri, Ragni	
Tasvir	S. Suleman	Sabiha, Santosh, Aslam Pervaiz, Talish	
Ujala	Kamal Ahmed	Sultana Zaman, Hasan Imam, Nasima Khan	East Pakistan
Watan Ka Sipahi		Mohammed Ali, Firdaus, Nanha, Sikander	
Woh Kon Thi		Rani, Habib, Zeenat, Saqi, Nabila	

== See also ==
- 1966 in Pakistan
