= List of Pakistani films of 1958 =

A list of films produced in Pakistan in 1958 (see 1958 in film) and in the Urdu language:

== 1958 ==
Title	Director	Cast	Notes
1958
Aadmi	Luqman	Nayyar Sultana, Habib, Talish, Yasmeen	
Akhari Dao	A. K. Chaudhry	Nayyar Sultana, Habib, Nazar, M. Ismail	
Akhari Nishan	Ashfaq Malik	Meena Shorey, Sudhir, Neelo, Nazar, Allauddin	
Anarkali	Anwar Kamal Pasha	Noor Jehan, Sudhir, Shamim Ara, Ragni, Hamalia Wala	Music by Rasheed Attre
Begunnah		Nayyar Sultana, Anwar Baig, Butt Kashir	
Bharosa		Yasmeen, Yousuf, Allauddin, Husna, Laila	
Changez Khan	Rafiq Sarhadi	Kamran, Asha, Allauddin, H. Choudhury	
Darbar		Sabiha Khanum, Santosh Kumar, Yasmeen, Allauddin, Neelo	
Dil Mein Too		Sabiha Khanum, Ejaz Durrani, Nayyar Sultana, Nazar, Lehri	
Hasrat		Sabiha Khanum, Santosh Kumar, Allauddin, Yousuf Khan	Music by Safdar
Jaan-e-Bahar	Shaukat Hussain Rizvi	Musarrat Nazir, Sudhir, Husna, Neelo, Shahnawaz	Music by Rasheed Attre
Lakhpati	M.A. Rasheed	Nighat, Saqi, Nasreen, Bilal	Producer: Khawaja Hashmat Ullah; Music: Masoom Rahim
Mumtaz		Ragni, Neelo, Ayaz, Mazhar Shah, Charlie	
Nai Ladki		Neelo, Aslam Pervaiz, Shahnawaz, Anjum, Amin Malik	
Naya Daur		Jamila, Aslam Pervaiz, Neelo, Diljit, Yousuf Khan	
Naya Zamana		Musarrat Nazir, Santosh Kumar, Asha, Ghulam Mohammed	
Pehla Qadam		Suzy, Haroon Rashid, Naina, Azad	
Rukhsana		Musarrat Nazir, Darpan, Nayyar Sultana, Neelo	
Sitaroon Ki Duniya		Ejaz Durrani, Sheeda Imam, Meena, Rukhsana, Charlie	
Tamanna		Yasmeen, Ejaz Durrani, Nighat Sultana, Diljit	
Tauheed		Nayyar Sultana, Talish, Laila, Salim Raza	
Wah Re Zamanay		Shamim Ara, Ejaz Durrani, Ratan Kumar, Rukhsana	
Zehr-e-Ishq	Masood Pervez	Musarrat Nazir, Habib, Yasmeen, Neelo	Music by Khurshid Anwar

== See also ==
- 1958 in Pakistan
