= List of Pakistani films of 1969 =

A list of films produced in Pakistan in 1969 (see 1969 in film) and in the Urdu language:

== 1969 ==
Title	Director	Cast	Notes
1969
Aanch		Shamim Ara, Mohammed Ali, Rehana, Aslam Pervaiz	
Aasra	Raza Mir	Shabnam, Mohammed Ali, Ratan Kumar, Nabila	
Anari	Mustafiz	Shabnam, Nadeem, J. Afghani, Naina	East Pakistan
Andaleeb	Farid Ahmed	Waheed Murad, Shabnam, Aaliya, Talish, Mustafa Qureshi	Music by Nisar Bazmi
Aneela	Raza Mir	Deeba, Nadeem, Rozina, Talish	
Assalam Alekum		Rozina, Feroze, K. Irani, Nirala	
Baharen Pbirbhi Aingi		Zeba, Mohammed Ali, Rozina, Lehri	
Bahu Rani		Zeba, Mohammed Ali, Rehana Siddiqui, Lehri	
Buzdil		Deeba, Habib, Ejaz Durrani, Sabira Sultana	
Chaudvin Saddi		Deeba, Kamal, Ahmed Rushdi, Aslam Pervaiz, Allaudin	
CID		Deeba, Sultan, Nasira, Saqi, Talish	
Daagh	Ehtesham	Shabnam, Nadeem, Jalil Afghani, M. Shahi	East Pakistan
Dard		Deeba, Ejaz Durrani, Masood Akhtar, Zeenat	
Dastan		Ratan Kumar, Ghazala, Shakil, Aaliya	
Dil Deke Dekho		Deeba, Kamal, Jaffrey, Lehri, Nanna	
Dil-e-Baitab		Shamim Ara, Mohammed Ali, Rani, Rangeela	
Diya Aur Toofan	Rangeela	Naghma, Ejaz Durrani, Rani, Haider	
Door ki Awaz		Deeba, Habib, Saqi, Ajmal	
Dr Shaitan		Tarrana, Waris, Nasira, Jaffrey	
Ek Nagina	S. A. Hafiz	Deeba, Waheed Murad, Aaliya, Lehri	
Fasana-e-dil	Shabab Kiranvi	Deeba, Nadeem, Nayyar, Darpan, Saiqa	
Geet Kahin Sangeet Kahin		Nasima, Mohammed Ali, Adeeb, Rangeela	
Ghar Damad		Kamal, Deeba, Tarannum, Nirala	
Ishara	Waheed Murad	Deeba, Waheed Murad, Rozina, Talat Hussain	
Jaise Jante Nahin		Zeba, Mohammed Ali, Rozina, Lehri	
Jina Bhi Munshkil	Tahir Choudhry	Reshma, Anwera, Hasan Imam, Anwar	East Pakistan
Kangan	Rahman	Sangeeta, Rahman, Anwar, Nina	East Pakistan
Khoon Nahaq		Rani, Sudhir, Aaliya, Zeenat	
Ladla	A. H. Siddiqui	Waheed Murad, Shabnam, Sabiha Khanum, Santosh, Rangeela	
Maa Beta	Hassan Tariq	Rani, Waheed Murad, Sabiha Khanum, Rangeela, Nanna	
Mehman		Deeba, Kamal, Nabila, Aslam Pervaiz, Lehri	
Mere Arman Mere Sapne	Azizur Rahman	Sujata, Azim, Raj, Sultana Zaman	East Pakistan
Meri Bahabi		Nayyar, Darpan, Zeenat, Saiqa	
Nai Laila Naya Majnu		Nasima Khan, Aaliya, Kamal, Lehri	
Naz	Sharif Nayyar	Shabnam, Mohammed Ali, Zamarrud, Rangeela, Adeeb	
Nazneen	Khalid Khurshid	Shabnam, Nadeem, Qavi, Rangeela	
Neela Parbat	Ahmad Bashir	Husna, Mohammad Ali, Komal, Talish, Kamal Irani	
Pak Daman	Hassan Tariq	Sabiha Khanum, Santosh, Ejaz Durrani, Deeba	
Piya Milan ki Aas		Husna, Mohammed Ali, Zamarud, Talish	
Piyasa	N. Islam	Rahman, Suchanda, Azim, Anwera	East Pakistan
Pyar ki Jeet		Rozina, Abid, Azad, Latif Charlie	
Qasam Uss Waqt Ki	A. J. Kardar	Shabnam, Tariq Aziz, Rosy, Rozina	
Salgira	Qamar Zaidi	Shamim Ara, Waheed Murad, Tariq Aziz, Nirala	
Saza		Rozina, Jamil, Nayyar, Darpan	
Shabistan		Saloni, Sudhir, Rukhsana, Rehan	
Tum Milay Pyar Mila		Zeba, Mohammed Ali, Iqbal Yusuf, Rangeela	
Tumhi Ho Mehboob Mere		Deeba, Waheed Murad, Rozina, Qavi	
Zarqa	Riaz Shahid	Neelo, Ejaz Durrani, Talish, Allaudin, Saqi	Music by Rashid Attre
Zindagi Kitni Hasin He		Zeba, Mohammed Ali, Rangeela, Ilyas	

== See also ==
- 1969 in Pakistan
