= List of Pakistani films of 1961 =

A list of films produced in Pakistan in 1961 (see 1961 in film) and in the Urdu language:

== 1961 ==
Title	Director	Cast	Notes
Ajab Khan		Husna, Sudhir, Talish, Nasira	
Bara Bajje		Neelo, Allauddin, Talish, Saqi	
Bekhabar		Nasrin, Sultan, Ajmal, Zarif	
Bombay Walla		Nighat, Nayyar, Saqi, Jamal	
Chotay Sarkar		Musarrat Nazir, Aslam Pervaiz, Nasrin, Talish	
Do Raste	Qadeer Ghori	Yousuf Khan, Bahar, Ejaz Durrani, Neelo, Talish	
Farishta	Luqman	Yasmeen, Ejaz Durrani, Husna, Talish	
Ghalib	S. A. Shah	Noor Jehan, Sudhir, S. Raza, Saqi	
Ghazi Bin Abbas		Husna, Ratan Kumar, Ammi, Saqi	
Gul Bakaoli	Munshi Dil	Jamila Razzaq, Sudhir, Ilyas	
Gulfaam	S. Suleman	Musarrat Nazir, Darpan, Nazar, Talish	
Gulfarosh	Zahur Raja	Nayyar Sultana, Kamal, Meena Shorey, Z. Raja, Naeem Hashmi	
Habu	Rahim Gul	Husna, Habib, Talish, Nazar, Ami Minwala	
Hum Eik Hain		Aslam Pervaiz, Jamila Razzaq, Asha Posley, Azad	
Insan Badalta Hai		Shamim Ara, Darpan, Lehri, Panna	
Jaan Nisar		Nazo, Rashdi, Nina, Qazi Wajid	
Jaduger	M. A. Rafiq	Bahar, Sultan, Kamal, Husna, A. Shah	
Lakhon Fasane		Suzy, Darpan, Bimla Kumari, Sikander	
Mangol		Musarrat Nazir, Aslam Pervaiz, Allauddin	
Saperan	Daud Chand	Laila, Habib, Nirala, Nasira, Asad	
Sher-e-Islam		Ratan Kumar, Laila, Rukhsana	
Son of Ali Baba		Nayyar Sultana, Aslam Pervaiz, Husna, Asha	
Subhah Kahin Sham Kahin		Neelo, Kamaal, Laila, Aslam Pervaiz, M. Ismail	
Sunheray Sapne		Musarrat Nazir, Aslam Pervaiz, Talish, Rukhsana	
Surraiya		Nayyar Sultana, Habib, Asad, Bokhari, Rukhsana	
Taj Aur Talwar		Ratan Kumar, Laila, Saqi, Kafira	
Teen Phool		Nayyar Sultana, Allauddin, Aslam Pervaiz, Husna	
Tum Na Mano		Habib, Sabira Sultana, Bahar, Naina	
Zamana Kya Kahega		Kamal, Shamim Ara, Rukhsana, Lehri	
Zamin Ka Chand		Shamim Ara, Aslam Pervaiz, Mazhar Shah, Kafira	

== See also ==
- 1961 in Pakistan
