= List of Pakistani films of 1971 =

A list of films produced in Pakistan in 1971 (see 1971 in film) and in the Urdu language:

== 1971 ==
Title	Director	Cast	Notes
Aansoo		Deeba, Nadeem, Shahid, Mahpara, Firdaus	
Afshan		Shabnam, Waheed Murad, Aaliya, Lehri	
Al-Asifa		Naghma, Sudhir, Talish, Salim Nasir	
Ansu Bahae Pathron Ne		Zeba, Mohammed Ali, Jamal, Seemz, Talish	
Babul		Sultan Rahi, Rani, Yusuf, Aaliya	
Chiragh Kahan Roshni Kahan	K. Khurshid	Nadeem, Shabnam, Qavi, Sangeeta, Aasia	
Dil Aur Duniya	Rangeela	Rangeela, Aasia, Habib, Sultan Rahi	
Do Baghi		Rani, Kamal, Habib, Lehri, Ilyas	
Dosti	Sharif Nayyar	Shabnam, Ejaz Durrani, Husna, Rahman, Saqi, Talish	
Duniya Na Mane		Zeba, Mohammed Ali, Zamarrud, Lehri, Ragni	
Eik Sapera		Aaliya, Iqbal Yusuf, Mahpara, Nirala, Saqi	
Garhasti		Sabiha, Santosh, Sangeeta, Lehri, Aslam Pervaiz, Jamal	
Gharnata	Riaz Shahid	Yusuf, Rozina, Aasia, Jamil	
Insaaf Aur Qanoon		Zeba, Mohammed Ali, Aslam Pervaiz, Wasim, Rizwan Wasti	
Jalte Soraj ke Neeche	Zahir Raihan, Nurul Haq	Nadeem, Babita, Rozina, Lehri, Allauddin	East Pakistan
Jane Bond 008 Operation Karachi		Raza Fazli, Rakshanda, Tarana, Naggo, Ansari	Iranian-Pakistani co-production
Khak Aur Khoon		Shamim Ara, Mohammed Ali, Talish, Saqi	
Khamosh Nighahen		Waheed Murad, Rozina, Husna, Tamanna	
Mehrban	Kazi Zaheer	Shabana, Razzaq, Anwera, Sultana Zaman	East Pakistan
Mera Dil Meri Arzoo		Deeba, Yusuf, Aaliya, Adeeb	
Mr 303		Rani, Nasrullah, Tarana, Adeeb, Shakir	
Neend Hamari Khwab Tumhare	K. Khurshid	Deeba, Waheed Murad, Aaliya, Talish, Nirala	
Parai Aag	Raza Mir	Shamim Ara, Nadeem, Zamarrud, Aasia	
Rim Jhim		Waheed Murad, Rozina, Kamal Irani, Zamarrud	
Roop Behroop		Kamal, Nisho, Zamarrud, Mehmood, Lehri	
Rootha Na Karo		Shabnam, Kamal, Lehri, Talish, Mahpara	
Sakhi Lutera		Rani, Nusrullah, Rangeela, Adeeb, Rehan	
Salaam-e-Mohabbat	S. T. Zaidi	Zeba, Mohammad Ali, Sangeeta, Lehri	
Sucha Sauda		Naghma, Rani, Kaifi, Inayat Bhatti, Razia	
Tehzeeb	Hassan Tariq	Rani, Shahid, Rangeela, Lehri, Aslam Pervaiz	
Teri Surat Meri Aankhen		Zeba, Mohammed Ali, Masood Akhter, Saiqa	
Wehshi	Hassan Tariq	Mohammed Ali, Shamim Ara, Jamil, Aaliya	
Yaaden		Zeba, Mohammed Ali, Zamarrud, Aasia, Nazim	
Yeh Aman	Riaz Shahid	Nisho, Sangeeta, Iqbal, Adeeb	

== See also ==
- 1971 in Pakistan
