= List of Pakistani films of 1957 =

A list of films produced in Pakistan in 1957 (see 1957 in film) and in the Urdu language:

== 1957 ==
Title	Director	Cast	Notes
1957
Aankh ka Nasha	Sibtain Fazli	Sabiha Khanum, Musarrat Nazir, Neelo, Sudhir	
Aas Paas	M. A. Rasheed	Sabiha Khanum, Aslam Pervaiz, Yasmeen, Nighat, Allauddin	
Anjaam	J. Bokhari	Yasmeen, Ilyas Kashmiri, Neelo, Rukshi, Shaikh Iqbal	
Baap Ka Gunaah	Jaffar Malik	Musarrat Nazir, Darpan, Salim Raza, Asif Jah	
Bada Admi	Humayun Mirza	Meena Shorey, Ejaz Durrani, M. Ismail, Allauddin	
Bedari	Rafiq Rizvi	Ragni, Santosh Kumar, Ratan Kumar, Anoradha	Music by Fateh Ali Khan
Daata	Ataullah Hashmi	Sabiha Khanum, Sudhir, Diljit, G. Mohammad	
Ishq-e-Laila	Munshi Dil	Sabiha Khanum, Santosh Kumar, Ajmal, Allauddin	Music by Safdar
Laila Majnu	Anwar Kamal Pasha	Bahar, Aslam Pervaiz, Ilyas, Shola	
Masoom	Sharif Nayyar	Yasmeen, Habib, Ratan Kumar, M. Ismail	
Maska Polish	Fida Yazdani	Anuradha, Ayyaz, Azad, Sharara, Agha Jan	
Muraad	Daud Chand	Yasmeen, Ilyas Kashmiri, Kamal, Nighat Sultana	
Nigar	Naeem Hashmi	Shahina, Ammaan, M. Ismail, Naeem Hashmi	
Noor-e-Islam	Nazir Ahmed Khan	Swaran Lata, Darpan, Nazir, Nazar	Music by Hasan Latif
Pasban	Haider Shah	Sabiha Khanum, Aslam Pervaiz, Asha Posley, Ghulam Mohammed	
Pholay Khan	Jamil Mirza	Sabiha Khanum, Aslam Pervaiz, Diljit, Neelo	
Saat Lakh	Jaffer Malik	Sabiha Khanum, Santosh Kumar, Nayyar Sultana, Talish, Neelo	Music by Rasheed Attre
Sardar	M. S. Dar	Sabiha Khanum, Santosh Kumar, Ilyas, Nayyar Sultana, Nazar	
Seestan	N. M. Khawaja	Musarrat Nazir, Shaad, Ajmal, Asha Posley, Salim Raza	
Shohrat	N. Ajmeri	Nasreen, Habib, Ilyas, A. Shah	
Thandi Sadak	A. Hameed	Musarrat Nazir, Syed Kamal, Zarif, Nadira	
Waada	W. Z. Ahmed	Sabiha Khanum, Santosh Kumar, Ilyas Kashmiri, Laila, Allauddin	Music by Rasheed Attre

== See also ==
- 1957 in Pakistan
