= Khalil Qaiser =

Pakistani film director and actor (1930–1966)

- Born: 1930; Nizamabad, Wazirabad, British India
- Died: September 21, 1966 (aged 35–36); Lahore, Punjab, Pakistan
- Resting place: Harley Street Graveyard, Rawalpindi Cantt
- Other name: Khalil Kaiser
- Occupations: Actor; Film director; Producer; Screenwriter
- Years active: 1955 – 1966
- Awards: Nigar Awards in 1959 and 1962

Khalil Qaiser (1930-1966) was a Pakistani film director, actor, producer, and screenwriter who worked in the 1950s and 1960s. Known for his politically charged and socially conscious films, his promising career was cut short when he was murdered at his home in 1966 by unknown assailants. Between 1961 and 1966, he directed seven films including Clerk (1960), Doshiza (1962), Shaheed (1962) and Farangi (1964). He also wrote the story for the 1965 film Fashion.

== Career ==
Khalil Qaiser began his career in the mid-1955 as an assistant to director Anwar Kamal Pasha. In 1955, Qaiser had a supporting role in Qatil, an Urdu film which was directed by his mentor, Anwar Kamal Pasha. By the late 1950s, he had emerged as an independent director, making a name for himself with films that were both critically acclaimed and commercially successful.

A defining feature of Qaiser's work was his frequent collaboration with writer and dialogue specialist Riaz Shahid. Their partnership resulted in several "leftist" and "revolutionary" films that tackled political and social issues. Many of Qaiser's movies were a direct critique of British rule in India.

== Death ==
In 1966, Khalil Qaiser was found murdered in his home at Lahore by unidentified assailants, cutting his career short.

== Filmography ==
Key
†	Denotes films that have not yet been released

=== Film ===
#	Title	Year	Director	Producer	Screenwriter	Actor	Ref(s)
1	Qatil	1955				Yes	
2	Kismet	1956			Yes		
3	Nagin	1959	Yes				
4	Yaar Beli	1959	Yes				
5	Clerk	1960	Yes			Yes	
6	Ajab Khan	1961	Yes				
7	Shaheed	1962	Yes	Yes			
8	Dosheeza	1962	Yes				
9	Farangi	1964	Yes	Yes			
10	Haveli	1964	Yes				
11	Fashion	1965			Yes		
12	Maa Baap	1967	Yes				

== Awards and recognition ==
Year	Award	Category	Result	Title	Ref.
1959	Nigar Awards	Best Director	Won	Nagin	
1962	Nigar Awards	Best Director	Won	Shaheed	

== Legacy ==
After his death, his collaborator Riaz Shahid continued to carry forward their legacy of anti-imperialist filmmaking, directing the blockbuster film Zarqa (1969). Although details about Qaiser's personal life are scarce, his professional impact on Pakistani cinema is well-documented, particularly for his contributions to socially and politically conscious filmmaking.
