= Yeh Aman =

1971 Pakistani film

- Urdu: یہ امن
- Directed by: Riaz Shahid
- Screenplay by: Riaz Shahid
- Produced by: Neelo (credited as Abida Riaz)
- Starring: Nisho; Sangeeta; Jameel; Iqbal Hassan
- Music by: A. Hameed
- Production company: Riaz Shahid Films
- Release date: 20 November 1971 (Pakistan)
- Country: Pakistan
- Language: Urdu

Yeh Aman is a 1971 Pakistani film directed by Riaz Shahid, who also wrote the screenplay. The film is produced by his wife and actress Neelo. The film stars Nisho, Sangeeta, Adeeb, Jameel and Allauddin. The plot revolves around the Kashmir conflict and highlights the brutalities of Indian armed force on Kashmiris. The music was composed by A. Hameed with lyrics by Habib Jalib. The film was censored, considering it as an anti-state film. Due to several cuts in the films, it failed to portray the director's vision, and was met with mixed critical reception. It was released 20 November 1971, days before Indo-Pakistani War of 1971, and could not perform well at the box office. After the film was censored, Shahid contracted cancer shortly after, and died next year of the film's release. Thus, it marked his last film.

== Plot ==
The film revolves around the brutalities of Indian armed forces on Kashmiris of Indian occupied Kashmir. The struggle and lives of Kashmiris who led miserable lives under the shadows of fear. The story starts from an innocent mute girl who is arrested by Indian armed forces who take her away with them and suspect her as an agent of Pakistan.

This film's core theme deals with the willingness of Kashmiris where they want to fight for their freedom.

== Cast ==
- Nisho
- Jameel
- Sangeeta
- Iqbal Hassan
- Adeeb
- Allauddin
- Agha Talish
- Saqi
- Shahid (guest appearance)

== Soundtrack ==
Yeh Aman
No.	Title	Singer (s)	Length
1.	"Ik larki ki shadi ayi"	Mala & co.
2.	"Khichi hui hai, dil peh meray khooni surkh lakeer"	Noor Jehan & Mujeeb Alam
3.	"Mujhay pyar say jab bhi awaz do"	Mujeeb Alam & Runa Laila
4.	"Zulm rahe aur aman bhi ho"	Noor Jehan
5.	"Zulm rahe aur aman bhi ho"	Mehdi Hassan
6.	"Ya peer dastgeer, madad kar"	Mehdi Hassan & co.
7.	"Urta hua waqat tham lo"	Runa Laila & Mujeeb Alam

== Production ==
The film was earlier titled as Aman. However, it was chopped by the film censor authorities and released as Yeh Aman on 20 November 1971 with some changes.

== Release and box office ==
The film was released on 20 November 1971 and faced censorship due to its bold narrative about struggle in Kashmir. The film ended up being an average film at the box office.

In 1975, the then Prime Minister of Pakistan Zulfikar Ali Bhutto announced the first protest day on Feb 5 in support of the Kashmiris, and this film was shown on PTV Home in 1975.

== Awards and nominations ==
Year	Award	Category	Awardee	Result	Ref.
1971	Nigar Awards	Best Screenplay	Riaz Shahid	Won	
1971	Nigar Awards	Best Supporting Actress	Snageeta	Won	
1971	Nigar Awards	Best Art director	Habib Shah	Won	
1971	Nigar Awards	Best Sound Editor	A. Z. Baig	Won	
