= Bari Malik =

Pakistani film producer and studio owner (1918-2015)

Bari Malik (1918 – 22 December 2015) was a film studio owner and a film producer of Pakistan.

== Biography ==
His birth name was Malik Ghulam Bari. Bari Malik was the older brother of Niaz Ali Malik, who was also an acclaimed film producer and distributor in Karachi. Bari Malik married three times, his first wife was Suraiya who was the ex-wife of Nasir Khan, Dilip Kumar's brother. His second wife was film actress Najma. Bari Malik and Najma together had three sons and one daughter, Raheel, Samia, Khurram and Zaraq. Later in his life, he married film actress Saloni and the two of them had two daughters, Maryam and Amber.

== Career ==
Bari Malik was considered one of the pioneers of the Pakistani film industry. A couple of his initial films Mahi Munda (1956) and Yakke Wali became huge commercial successes and earned him a lot of money. He ended up building his own film studio called Bari Studios in Lahore with his earnings.

He also became controversial in Pakistan by first importing an Indian film in 1954, Jaal. Many local film industry people got upset over this because they felt that the local film industry was not given enough time yet to establish itself in its early days. Street protests resulted in Lahore, Pakistan and this was later named Jaal movement by the local news media in 1954.

== Filmography ==
=== As a producer ===
- Mahi Munda (1956)
- Yakke Wali (1957)
- Sehti (1957)
- Yaar Beli (1959)
- Doosri Shadi (1968)

== Death and legacy ==
Bari Malik died on 22 December 2015 in Lahore, Pakistan at the age of 97. He was buried in Gulberg, Lahore. Many Pakistani film personalities attended his funeral who called his death a big loss for the Pakistani film industry.
