= Anarkali (1958 film) =

1958 Pakistani film

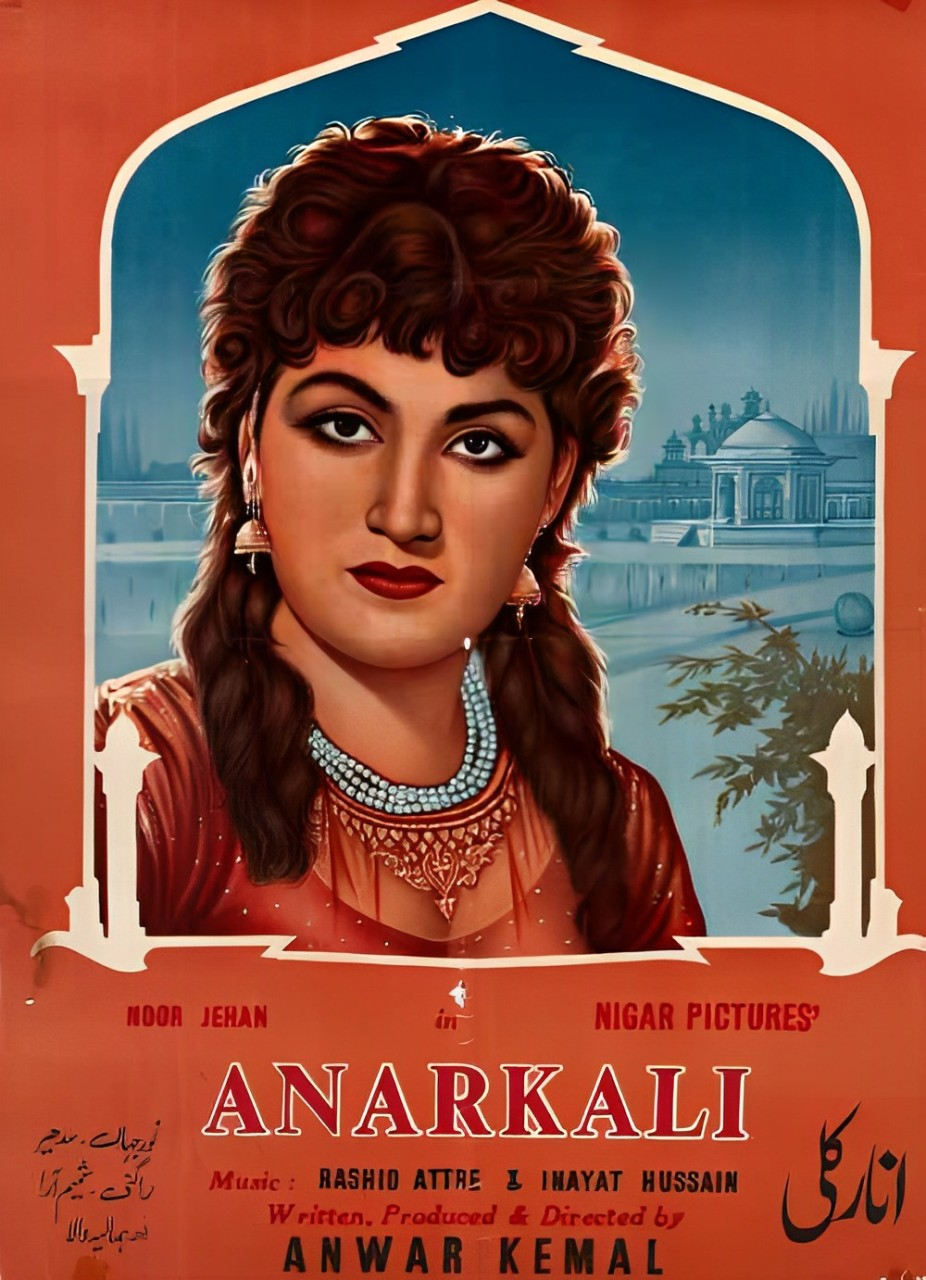
- Directed by: Anwar Kamal Pasha
- Screenplay by: Qamar Ajnalvi
- Story by: Imtiaz Ali Taj
- Based on: Anārkalī by Imtiaz Ali Taj
- Produced by: Mukhtar Ahmed
- Starring: Noor Jehan; Sudhir; Himalaya Wala; Bibbo; Shamim Ara; Ragni; Asha Posley
- Music by: Rashid Attre; Master Inayat Hussain
- Production company: Nigar Pictures
- Release date: 4 June 1958
- Running time: ~ 2 hours
- Country: Pakistan
- Language: Urdu

Anarkali is a 1958 Pakistani historical drama film, directed by Anwar Kamal Pasha and starring Noor Jehan and Sudhir in lead roles. Based on the Urdu play of the same name by Imtiaz Ali Taj, the screenplay is written by Qamar Ajnalvi. The film revolves around the love of Jahangir for a tawaif Anarkali, which creates a serious conflict between Prince Jahangir and his father, Mughal emperor Akbar. The film was released on 4 June 1958, and its performance was 'average' at the box office.

Made with a budget of high production, the film is usually compared with the landmark Bollywood film, Mughal-e-Azam (1960), which was also based on the same play. Anarkali was praised for its music, which was composed by Master Inayat Hussain and Rashid Attre. At the Nigar Awards ceremony in 1958, it won one award: Best Lyricist for Qateel Shifai.

== Cast ==
- Noor Jehan as Nadira/ Anarkali
- Sudhir as Prince Salim
- Himalaya Wala as Emperor Jalal-u-Din Mohammad Akbar
- Shamim Ara as Suraiya
- Ragni as Dilaram
- Zohra Mirza as Jodha Bai
- M. Ajmal as Abu'l Fazl
- Fazal Haq as Daroga
- Bibbo as Begum
- G.N. Butt as Man Singh
- Asha Posley as Maharani
- Zarif as Prince Salim's friend

== Soundtrack ==
Anarkali
| No. | Title | Lyrics | Music | Singer (s) | Length |
|---|---|---|---|---|---|
| 1. | "Sadaa Hoon Apney Pyar Ki" | Qateel Shifai | Rashid Attre | Noor Jehan |
| 2. | "Jaltey Haeen Armaan Mera Dil Rota Hai" | Tanvir Naqvi | Rashid Attre | Noor Jehan |
| 3. | "Kahan Tak Suno Gey Kahan Tak Sunaoon" | Tanvir Naqvi | Rashid Attre | Noor Jehan |
| 4. | "O Beewafa Hum Na Bhooley Tujhey" | Saifuddin Saif | Master Inayat Hussain | Noor Jehan |
| 5. | "Phir Jo Nigah-e-Yar Kahe, Maan Jaaiye" | Qateel Shifai | Master Inayat Hussain |

== Release ==
The film was released on 4 June 1958. It managed to achieve a jubilee at the cinemas.

== Production ==
Imtiaz Ali Taj's Anārkalī was adapted as a screenplay by director Anwar Kamal Pasha for the film Anarkali. In the 1940s, Mohammad Afzal, better known by his stage name Himalaya Wala, was selected to play the character of Salim's Rajput friend, Durjan Singh, in K. Asif adaptation of Taj's play, Mughal-e-Azam, but due to political turmoil and the worst conditions in the country that led to the independence of Pakistan, the project was halted, and he went on to star in Anarkali after he migrated to Pakistan.

The film is compared with the landmark Indian film Mughal-e-Azam, which was also based on the same play by Taj and broke all the box office records but Anarkali could not perform remarkably at the box office and had low a production budget in comparison to its rival.

== Reception ==
Film analysts criticized the casting of Noor Jehan as Anarkali, as Jehan was in her 30s by then and chubby at that time, nowhere resembled a young, pretty female servant as is portrayed in the play. The film music was however praised.

== Awards and nominations ==
=== Nigar Awards ===
- Best Lyricist - Qateel Shifai
