= Qateel Shifai =

Pakistani poet and lyricist (1919–2001)

- قتیل شفائی
- Born: Muhammad Aurangzeb; 24 December 1919; Haripur, Hazara Division; British India, now Pakistan
- Died: 11 July 2001 (aged 81); Lahore, Punjab, Pakistan
- Occupations: Urdu poet, film songs lyricist
- Writing career
- Pen name: Qateel Shifai
- Genres: Ghazal and Nazm
- Notable awards: Pride of Performance in 1994 by the Government of Pakistan; Adamjee Literary Award in 1964; Amir Khusro Award in India; 4 Nigar Awards including (Special Millennium Award) for his lifetime contributions to Pakistan Film Industry in 1999
- Movement: Progressive Writers Movement

Muhammad Aurangzeb (24 December 1919 – 11 July 2001), commonly known by his pen name Qateel Shifai (Urdu: قتیل شفائی), was a Pakistani Urdu poet and lyricist.

== Early life and career ==
Qateel Shifai was born in Haripur District as Muhammad Aurangzeb in 1919 in British India (now Pakistan). He was of Hindkowan background.

He adopted Qateel Shifai as his pen name in 1938, under which he was known in the world of Urdu poetry. "Qateel" was his "takhallus" and "Shifai" was in honour of his ustaad (teacher) Hakeem Mohammed Yahya Shifa Khanpuri, whom he considered his mentor.

Due to his father's death in 1935, Qateel was forced to quit his higher education. He started his own sports goods shop. Being unsuccessful in his business, he decided to move from his small town to Rawalpindi, where he started working for a transport company and later joined the Pakistani film industry in 1947 as a film song lyricist. "His father was a businessman and there was no tradition of sher-o-shayari (poetry) in his family. Initially, he showed his poetry to Hakeem Yahya Shifa Khanpuri for correction and advice. Qateel derived his poetic surname 'shifai' from him. Later, he became the disciple of Ahmad Nadeem Qasmi who was his friend and neighbor."

"In 1946, he was called to Lahore by Nazir Ahmed to work as the assistant editor of the monthly 'Adab-e-Latif', a literary magazine published since 1936. His first ghazal was published in the Lahore weekly 'Star', edited by the poet Qamar Ajnalvi."

In January 1947, Qateel was asked to write the songs for a film by a Lahore-based film producer, Dewan Sardari Lal. The first film he penned the lyrics for was Teri Yaad (1948) in Pakistan. Later, after working for some time as assistant lyricist to some of the famous poets/lyricists of the time (1948 to 1955), he eventually became a highly successful film lyricist of Pakistan and won numerous awards over the years for his film song lyrics despite a crowded field of competitors in those days. Among his contemporaries were poets like Kaifi Azmi, Amrita Pritam, Majrooh Sultanpuri, Sahir Ludhianvi, Majaz Lucknawi, Tanvir Naqvi, Saifuddin Saif, Ahmad Faraz and Muhammad Hasan Askari.

In 1988, Qateel Shifai started work on his autobiography "Ghungroo Toot Gaye" with the assistance of his pupil and Urdu poet Naeem Chishti. This took quite a few years to complete. The book was finally published after his death by his son Naveed Qateel in 2006. The book revealed many hidden facts about the film industry and literary circles and about the personal lives of legendary personalities like Sahir Ludhianvi, Noor Jehan and Iqbal Bano.

== Death and legacy ==
Qateel Shifai died on 11 July 2001 in Lahore, Pakistan.

Over 20 collections of verse and over 2,500 film songs for Pakistani and Indian films were published. He wrote songs for 201 Pakistani and Indian films. His talent has transcended national borders. His poetry has been translated into numerous languages including Hindi, Gujarati, English, Russian and Chinese. On Qateel Shifai's 11th death anniversary in 2012, Salahuddin Darvesh, a literary figure, said in an interview, "Shifai was one of those great poets of 20th century who had gained international recognition."

== Awards and recognition ==
- 'Pride of Performance Award' in 1994 for his contribution to literature by the Government of Pakistan.
- Adamjee Literary Award in 1964, 'Naqoosh Award', 'Abbasin Arts Council Award' were all given to him in Pakistan.
- He won Best Poet Award at 9th PTV Awards in 1998
- The much coveted 'Amir Khusro Award' was given in India.
- 'Special Millennium Nigar Award' for his lifetime contributions to the Pakistan film industry in 1999. In addition, Qateel won other 3 Nigar Awards in 1958, 1965 and 1979

Qateel Shifai produced a film in his mother language—Hindko—in 1970. It was the first Hindko film which was named "Qissa Khwani". The film was released in 1980. He died on 11 July 2001 in Lahore. The street on which he lived in Lahore has been named Qateel Shifai Street after him. There is also a sector of Haripur city that has been named after him – Mohallah Qateel Shifai.

== Filmography ==
Includes both Pakistani and Indian films.

- Bade Dilwala (1999) (lyricist)
- Yeh Hai Mumbai Meri Jaan (1999) (lyricist)
- Auzaar (1997) (lyricist)
- Tamanna (1997) (as Qateel Shifai)
- Naajayaz (1995) (lyricist) (as Qateel Shifai)
- Naaraaz (1994) (as Qateel Shifai)
- Hum Hain Bemisaal (1994) (as Qateel Shifai)
- Sir (1993) (lyricist) (as Qateel Shifai)
- Phir Teri Kahani Yaad Aayee (1993) (Your Memories Have Returned) (lyricist) (as Qateel Shifai)
- Tahqiqaat (1993) (lyricist) (as Cratil Sipahi)
- Painter Babu (1983) (lyricist)
- Kudrat (1981) (lyricist, only 1 theme/title song - Dukh sukh ki har ek mala)
- Behan Bhai (1979)
- Seeta Maryam Margaret (1978)
- Begum Jaan (1977)
- Shireen Farhad (1975) (lyricist)
- Naila (1965) (lyricist) (Qateel Shifai won the Nigar Award for this film)
- Farangi (1964) (lyricist)
- Chingari (1964)
- Haveli (1964) (lyricist)
- Seema (1963) (lyricist)
- Qaidi (lyricist)
- Shaheed (1962) (lyricist)
- Clerk (1960) (lyricist)
- Zehr-e-Ishq (1958) (lyricist)
- Anarkali (1958) (Qateel Shifai won the Nigar Award for this film)
- Nagin (1959)
- Intezaar (1956) (lyricist)
- Qatil (1955) (lyricist)
- Gumnaam (1954) (assisted Hakim Ahmad Shuja as junior lyricist)
- Gulnaar (1953) (assistant lyricist)
- Teri Yaad (1948) (assistant lyricist) – (Your Memories- Equivalent Film Title in English) (First released film in the Pakistani film industry)
