= Dosti (1971 film) =

1971 film

- Urdu: دوستی
- Directed by: Sharif Nayyar
- Written by: Ali Sufiyan Afaqi
- Produced by: Ejaz Durrani
- Starring: Shabnam; Ejaz Durrani; Abdur Rahman; Husna; Rangeela; Agha Talish; Saqi; Tani Begum
- Cinematography: M. Fazil
- Edited by: Arshad Durrani
- Music by: A. Hameed
- Production company: Punjab Pictures
- Release date: 7 February 1971 (Pakistan)
- Country: Pakistan
- Language: Urdu

Dosti is a 1971 Pakistani romantic musical film directed by Sharif Nayyar and produced by Ejaz Durrani who also played the leading role in the film along with Shabnam and Abdur Rahman. The film was released on 7 February 1971, was Diamond jubilee success at the box office. It was also released in the UK. The film was shot in Northern Areas of Pakistan (Naran, Kaghan) and the UK.

The film became popular due to its music which was composed by A. Hameed. "Chitthi Zara Saiyaan Ji", "Roothe Saiyaan" and "Yeh Wadiyaan" were the big hits from the film. At the 1971 Nigar Awards, the film won the highest number of awards including the Best Film award, Best Director award and Best Actress award for Shabnam.

== Overview ==
The film depicts the difference of eastern and western culture.

A naive Pakistani villager Raju goes to England to earn money so that he could become a rich person and marry his lover, Rani. When he goes there he gets deceived by a traveling agent who takes all of his money from him. Now the circumstances compel him to marry someone else while his fiancée Rani still awaits for him back in Pakistan.

== Cast ==
- Shabnam as Rani
- Ejaz Durrani as Raju
- Rahman
- Husna
- Rangeela
- Agha Talish
- Saqi
- Tani Begum

== Soundtrack ==
All music is composed by A. Hameed

No.	Title	Lyrics	Singer (s)	Length
1.	"Yeh Wadiyaan, Yeh Parbaton Ki Shahzadiyaan"	Qateel Shifai	Noor Jehan
2.	"Chitthi Zara Saiyaan Ji Ke Naam Likh De"	Tanvir Naqvi	Noor Jehan
3.	"Roothe Saiyaan Ko Main Tau Apnay, Khud Hi Manay Chali Aayi"	Kaleem Usmani	Noor Jehan
4.	"Aa Re Aa Re"	Kaleem Usmani	Mujeeb Alam & Noor Jehan
5.	"Bus Gaya Tu Sotanyan Ke Dawar, Sajna"	Qateel Shifai	Noor Jehan
6.	"Gori, Rain Millan Ki Aayi"	Tanvir Naqvi	Noor Jehan & others
7.	"Sajna, Bhool Na Jana"	Kaleem Usmani	Noor Jehan
8.	"Soch Le Tu Abhi"	Kaleem Usmani	Mala Begum

== Release and reception ==
The film was released on 7 February 1971 in Pakistan and the UK and was a box office success. It achieved the status of Diamond Jubilee in Karachi cinema with a theatrical run of 100 days.

The Statesman (Pakistan) praised the film's story and said it was "an entertaining film".

== Awards and nominations ==
Year	Award	Category	Awardee	Result	Ref.
1971	Nigar Awards	Best Film	Ejaz Durrani	Won	
1971	Nigar Awards	Best Director	Sharif Nayyar	Won	
1971	Nigar Awards	Best Actress	Shabnam	Won	
1971	Nigar Awards	Best Musician	A. Hameed	Won	
1971	Nigar Awards	Best Female Playback Singer	Noor Jehan	Won	
1971	Nigar Awards	Best Lyricist	Tanvir Naqvi	Won	
1971	Nigar Awards	Best Editing	Arshad Durrani	Won	
1971	Nigar Awards	Best Cinematographer	M. Fazil	Won	
