= Do Raste =

1961 Pakistani film

- Directed by: Qadeer Ghori
- Produced by: Malik Abdul Rauf
- Starring: Bahar Begum; Yousuf Khan; Talish; Ejaz Durrani
- Music by: Master Inayat Hussain
- Production company: Malik Rafiq
- Release date: 1961
- Language: Urdu

Do Raste is a 1961 Pakistani film directed ghouri malik produced by Malik Abdul rauf, starting Bahar Begum, Yousuf Khan, Ejaz Durrani, Neelo, and Talish with music by Master Inayat Hussain also known as Inayat Hussain.

== Cast ==
- Bahar Begum
- Yousuf Khan
- Ejaz Durrani
- Neelo
- Talish

=== Film's Music ===
The music was composed by Inayat Hussain but this film had no 'hit' songs in it.

== Film's Reception at the box-office ==
Do Raste was a big flop film among the Pakistani public.
