= Behan Bhai (1968 film) =

1968 film

- Poster
- Directed by: Hassan Tariq
- Written by: Tanvir Kazmi
- Screenplay by: Hassan Tariq
- Produced by: Khawaja Insha Allah Kitchlew
- Starring: Nadeem; Kamal; Rani; Deeba; Ejaz; Husna; Aliya Begum; Tani Begum; Aslam Pervaiz; Talat Siddiqui
- Music by: A. Hameed
- Release date: 24 May 1968 (Pakistan)
- Country: Pakistan
- Language: Urdu

Behan Bhai is a 1968 Pakistani drama film directed by Hassan Tariq, who also wrote the screenplay. The film stars an ensemble cast of Nadeem, Kamal, Rani, Deeba, Ejaz, Husna, Aliya Begum, Tani Begum, and Aslam Pervaiz. The music was composed by A. Hameed. The film was screened at Lok Virsa Museum, Pakistan, in March 2017.

== Plot ==
A woman, with her five children, heads towards the newly created Pakistan along with a refugee caravan. The caravan faces a deadly storm, and all the children get separated from each other. Years pass, and the mother loses her mental balance due to the separation of her children. On the other hand, all of her children grow up and live their own lives separately except for the sister, who lives in a village with one of her brothers who is unemployed. While others adapt different ways to make a living, like pickpocketing, procuring and working as an office worker.

== Cast ==
- Nadeem
- Kamal
- Rani
- Deeba
- Ejaz
- Husna
- Aliya Begum
- Tani Begum
- Aslam Pervaiz
- Talat Siddiqui
- Ilyas Kashmiri

== Music soundtrack ==
All film songs are written by Saifuddin Saif and Fayyaz Hashmi. Music is composed by A. Hameed.

- Ae Bekasson Kay Wali, De De Hamein Sahara Sung by Mala and Mehdi Hassan
- Hello Hello Mr. Abdul Ghani Sung by Ahmed Rushdi and Irene Perveen

== Awards ==
- 1968 - Nigar Awards - Best Director - Hassan Tariq
- 1968 - Nigar Awards - Special Award - Kamal
