= Nazia Ejaz Khan =

Pakistani-Australian artist

Nazia Ejaz is a Pakistani Australian artist.

== Early life and education ==
Nazia Ejaz was born in Lahore to Noor Jehan and Ejaz Durrani. She received her early education from the National College of Arts. In 1993, she moved to London to study at Slade School of Art. Later, she received a scholarship to study at the School of Oriental and African Studies (SOAS), where she earned a graduate diploma in Indian art in 1996.

== Career ==
After the completion of her studies, she worked as a painter and teacher in the United Kingdom and Pakistan. In 2003, Nazia exhibited her first artwork at Chawkandi Art Gallery in Karachi. For two years, she taught at the Indus Valley School of Art and Architecture.

In 2005, Nazia moved to Australia with her husband. After living in Australia for 14 years, in 2014, she moved back to Pakistan and now lives in Karachi.

== Personal life ==
Nazia is married and has two children.

== Awards and recognition ==
She is a recipient of Staff Nomination Award, University of South Australia, 2015.

== Selected exhibitions ==
- 2015: Jaali, Kerry Packer Civic Gallery
- 2017: The Green Room, Canvas Gallery
- 2019: Love Letters, Canvas Gallery
