= Raaz (1959 film) =

1959 film

- Film poster
- Original title: راز
- Directed by: Humayun Mirza
- Written by: Riaz Shahid (dialogues)
- Story by: Saleem Ahmed
- Produced by: Humayun Mirza
- Starring: Ejaz Durrani; Musarrat Nazir; Allauddin; Shamim Ara; Agha Talish; Bibbo; Saqi; Sultan Rahi
- Cinematography: Masood Ur Rehman
- Music by: Feroz Nizami
- Release date: 18 June 1959
- Country: Pakistan
- Language: Urdu

Raaz (Urdu: راز; lit. 'Secret') is a 1959 Pakistani suspense thriller film directed by Humayun Mirza, with a screenplay by Riaz Shahid from a story by Saleem Ahmed. It stars Ejaz Durrani, Musarrat Nazir, Allauddin, Talish and Shamim Ara. Its music was composed by Feroz Nizami. The film revolves around a police officer who left his job to prove the innocence of his friend who is accused of a murder. At the annual Nigar Awards ceremony, it received two awards, including Best Film of 1959.

== Plot ==
A passenger gets caught by police with a corpse in the box. The passenger's friend, who is in police tries to free him from this trouble but losses his job due to being biased towards the alleged murder. The slain's daughter visits the police station regularly but couldn't be satisfied until Inspector ensures her his support.

== Cast ==
- Ejaz Durrani
- Musarrat Nazir
- Allauddin
- Shamim Ara
- Diljeet Mirza
- Rekha
- Saqi
- Bibbo
- Sultan Rahi

== Soundtrack ==
The music of the film was composed by Feroz Nizami and, lyrics were penned by Kaleem Usmani and Tufail Ahmed Jamali.

=== Tracklist ===
- "Aye Zindagi Rulaye Ja, Qissa-e-gham Sunaye Ja" sung by Mubarak Begum
- "Bach Ke Zara, Hat Ke Badmast Raho" sung by Mubarak Khan
- "Chal Na Sakay Gi 420" sung by Ahmed Rushdi
- "Maan, Maan, Maan, Zamana Hai Jawan" by Mubarak Begum and Ahmed Rushdi
- "Meethi Meethi Baton Se Jiya Na Jala" sung by Zubaida Khanum
- "Mast Nazar, Mori Hai Patli Kamar" sung by Mubarak Begum

== Relsase and box office ==
The film was released on 18 June 1959 and ran for 50 weeks in theaters.

== Awards ==
At the annual Nigar Awards, it received two awards including, Best Film.

| Category | Awardee |
|---|---|
| Best Film | Raaz |
| Best Supporting Actor | Allauddin |
