= Beti (1964 film) =

Pakistani film

- بیٹی
- Directed by: Raza Mir
- Written by: Nazim Panipati (story); Zia Sarhadi (dialogues)
- Produced by: Iqbal Shehzad
- Starring: Neelo; Ejaz; Gutto
- Music by: Deebo Bhattacharya
- Distributed by: Montana Films
- Release date: 31 July 1964
- Country: Pakistan
- Language: Urdu

Beti (also spelled as Baitee lit. 'Daughter') is a Pakistani film directed by Raza Mir and produced by Iqbal Shehzad. Nazim Panipati was the story writer, with dialogues by Zia Sarhadi. It stars Neelo and Ejaz with child actor Gutto in lead roles. The plot revolves around a famous actress who accepts anonymity to save her daughter and house. The music was composed by Deebo Bhattacharya. Released in July 1964, it was the first film of Mir as director. Beti is considered as one of the best performance of Neelo.

== Plot ==
The plot revolves around a married couple, where the actress wife gets unwell during her shooting. On visiting a doctor, it reveals on her that she is pregnant. She does want the unborn and asks the doctor for an abortion. But, on the insistence and love of her husband, she changes her decision.

After giving birth to a daughter, she returns to the film's set and completes the shooting. Due to her engaging and busy schedule, the daughter gets neglected and the couple gets divorced. The husband decides to leave with the daughter but she gets abducted by a baby snatcher on the way. In the love of her daughter, the wife looks for her daughter but learns about her abduction. She decides to save her daughter and house, leaving her passion behind.

== Cast ==
- Neelo
- Ejaz
- Gutto
- Rukhsana
- Asaf Jafri
- Talish
- Nasira
- Maya Devi
- Saqi
- Kalavati
- S. Gul
- Diljeet Mirza

== Soundtrack ==
All music is composed by Deebo Bhattacharya.

Beti
No.	Title	Lyrics	Singer (s)	Length
1.	"Hum Tera Shehar Chhor Jayen Ge"	Habib Jalib	Noor Jehan
2.	"Raat Ki Palken Bheegi Hui Hain"	Fayyaz Hashmi	Noor Jehan
3.	"Barson Ki Judai Kese"	Fayyaz Hashmi	Noor Jehan
4.	"Aise Bhi Masoom Hain, Is Dunya Mein"	Fayyaz Hashmi	Masood Rana
5.	"Ro Ro Ke Tujh Ko Bhulaun"	Fayyaz Hashmi	Irene Perveen
6.	"Zra Bach Ke Bhayya Rehan Yahan"	Fayyaz Hashmi	Rubina Badar and chorus
7.	"Chhan Chhana Chhan Bichwa Bolay, Kangna Dolay"	Fayyaz Hashmi	Naseem Begum
8.	"Dunya Rail Gari, Hai Saanp Ki Sawari"	Fayyaz Hashmi	Masood Rana, Rubina Badar, Ahmed Rushdi, Irene Perveen, and chorus
