= Shaheed (1962 film) =

1962 Pakistani film

- Directed by: Khalil Qaiser
- Written by: Riaz Shahid (dialogues)
- Screenplay by: Riaz Shahid
- Produced by: Khalil Qaiser
- Starring: Musarrat Nazir; Talish; Ejaz Durrani; Husna; Allauddin; Saqi; Himalyawalla
- Music by: Rashid Attre
- Production company: K. K. Productions
- Release date: 5 January 1962 (Pakistan)
- Running time: 125 minutes
- Country: Pakistan
- Language: Urdu

Shaheed (lit. 'Martyr') is a 1962 Pakistani Urdu language music blockbuster classical film directed and produced by Khalil Qaiser under the production banner of K. K. Productions, and was a new banner that Qaiser formed.

Riaz Shahid wrote the dialogues and screenplay for Shaheed, while Rashid Attre composed the music. It features Musarrat Nazir, Allauddin and Husna in the lead among other protagonist characters. It is recognized as one of the successful films of the Pakistani cinema. In 2016, the Lok Virsa Museum screened the film as part of retaining historical film records in the museum.

Attre's composition from the poems by Munir Niazi and Faiz Ahmad Faiz played a prominent role in the film. It was later nominated for the Nigar Awards, presented by the Nigar magazine. The film became the recipient of nine Nigar Awards, leading it to become one of the Pakistani films with maximum awards received. The film revolves around political and social themes, in particular anti-imperialism theme reportedly based on Lawrence of Arabia.

== Plot ==
The fictional story of the film involves a European trader named Lawrence who arrives in Saudi Arabia wearing a helmet with a cigar in his hand, accompanied by his femme fatale named Laila. After reaching in the country, he formulates a plan to extract petroleum from the Arabian Desert. He subsequently meets a person named Haris who works as an Arab blacksmith. Haris decides to resist the European trader, a former chieftain who has been exiled from the desert or the country. After she learns about his love, she returns to her home and this event leaves her heart broken. She then sings a song titled "Us bewafa ka shahar" (the city of the unfaithful) which became one of the prominent songs of the 1960s.

Laila, a femme fatale has been exiled from the tribe for her involvement in street dancing which is supposed to be a shameful act in the Arabian tribes. Despite being neglected by Haris, she wants him to take over the trader, and later she sets herself ablaze for Harris's victory in resistance and the oil refinery is damaged. She also sets herself ablaze as a result of her honour suicide in an attempt to regain her pride in the tribe and to save her country from the foreign occupiers.

== Cast ==
- Talish as Lawrence
- Musarrat Nazir as Laila
- Ejaz Durrani as Haris
- Husna as Aaliya while Emir opposes petroleum extraction. Laila falls in love with Haris, he however falls in love with Aaliya.
- Allauddin as Emir

== Soundtrack ==
All music is composed by Rashid Attre

Saheed
No.	Title	Lyrics	Singer (s)	Length
1.	"Us bewafa ka shehar hai aur hum hain dosto""	Munir Niazi	Naseem Begum
2.	"Nisar Mein Teri Galiyon Pe Ae Watan Ke Jahan"	Faiz Ahmed Faiz	Munir Hussain
3.	"Habibi Hayya Hayya"	Tanvir Naqvi	Naseem Begum
4.	"Meri Nazrein Hain Talwar"	Munir Niazi	Naseem Begum
5.	"Jab Sanwali Shaam Dhale"	Qateel Shifai	Naseem Begum
6.	"Main Ka Kaha Aaiye Dhale"	Tanvir Naqvi	Naseem Begum, Ahmad Rushdi
7.	"Main Ka Kaha Aaiye Dhale"	Tanvir Naqvi	Naseem Begum, Ahmed Rushdi
8.	"Oh Kahe Dil Ki Umang"	Tufail Hoshiarpuri	Zubaida Khanum
9.	"Theher Theher Kei Teer"	Tanvir Naqvi	Naheed Niazi

== Legacy ==
Considered as an important film of 1962, Shaheed is among the only a few female-led films, that became successful at the box office too by accomplishing the status of a golden jubilee film.

Shaheed was selected among the "Top ten films" of the Pakistani cinema by the critic Aijaz Gul, as published in "Asian Film Journeys: Selection from Cinemaya". The critic also included it in the same list as published by BBC Urdu.

The film was remade by Hassan Tariq as Watan (1981), starring Rani, Muhammad Ali and Shahid in leading roles.

== Awards and nominations ==
Award	Category	Awardee	Nominated work	Result	Ref.
List of Nigar awards	Nigar Awards	Best film	Shaheed	Shaheed	Won
List of Nigar awards	Nigar Awards	Best director	Khalil Qaiser	Shaheed	Won
List of Nigar awards	Nigar Awards	Best script writer	Riaz Shahid	Shaheed	Won
List of Nigar awards	Nigar Awards	Best screenplay	Riaz Shahid	Shaheed	Won
List of Nigar awards	Nigar Awards	Best actress	Musarrat Nazir	Shaheed	Won
List of Nigar awards	Nigar Awards	Best supporting actor	Talish	Shaheed	Won
List of Nigar awards	Nigar Awards	Best musician	Rasheed Attre	Shaheed	Won
List of Nigar awards	Nigar Awards	Best lyricist	Faiz Ahmed Faiz	Shaheed	Won
List of Nigar awards	Nigar Awards	Best playback female singer	Naseem Begum	Shaheed	Won
