= Clerk (1960 film) =

1960 film

- Directed by: Khalil Qaiser
- Written by: Younis Rahi
- Screenplay by: Riaz Shahid
- Produced by: Wazir Ali
- Starring: Khalil Qaiser; Musarrat Nazir; Ratan Kumar; Naeema Garaj
- Music by: Safdar Hussain
- Production company: Films Hayat
- Release date: 22 January 1960
- Country: Pakistan
- Language: Urdu

Clerk is a Pakistani film directed by Khalil Qaiser, who also played the title role of a poor clerk tired of his economic condition and hectic daily routine. It marked his second appearance as an actor.

It also stars Musarrat Nazir and Ratan Kumar in important roles. The story was written by Younis Rahi with dialogues by Riaz Shahid. Safdar Hussain was the music composer.

The film belonged to the genre of art house. It was a commercial failure but was a critically acclaimed film. The film was included among the films of 1959–1961 which were meant not to generate money alone.

== Plot ==
Anwar works day and night as a clerk in an office to make both ends meet. He lives a hard life with her faint mother. His tensions increase when her beloved one Shamim marries a rich man, the owner of his office. To lessen the difficulties of his peon, he himself marries his sister when her previous engagement breaks off. Due to his hectic work routine, he first doesn't pay attention to his wife Najma but upon realising it, he apologizes to her. They mutually consummate their marriage, resulting in the birth of two children. The children's birth further increases the pressure on him to earn more. At their school-going age, he becomes unable to pay their school fee due to his low income. He eventually decides to steal it from the office but is caught red-handed and jailed. His brother-in-law Amjad also is jailed when he tries to pick a pocket to pay the fees of his nephews. Due to poverty in the house, Najma then takes her children to admit them to an orphanage where the orphanage's owner (Anwar's office owner and Shamim's husband) offers to get her a job and calls her at her house. There, he tries to assault her but is saved by Amjad, who just reaches there in search of Najma after leaving the cell. Amjad is hanged for the crime of his murder and all of his wealth goes to his wife, Shamim. Upon discovering that his husband was killed by Anwar's brother-in-law, she helps Najma as she escapes an abusive marriage. Anwar is released from jail and Najma takes her children back from the orphanage. Shamim establishes schools for the children of the poor only and Najma and Anwar help her in this mission.

== Cast ==
- Khalil Qaiser as Anwar
- Musarrat Nazir as Najma
- Ratan Kumar as Amjad
- Laila as Shamim
- Naeema Garaj as Najma's daughter
- Salma Mumtaz
- Baby Najmi
- Master Mushtaq
- Saqi

== Soundtrack ==
The music director of the film's soundtrack was Safdar Hussain, and the lyrics were written by Qateel Shifai and Ahmad Rahi.

=== Track list ===
#	Title	Singer(s)
1	Bhatak Rahe Hain Hum Jahan	Saleem Raza
2	Baki Sab Khariat Hai	Saleem Raza, Sain Akhtar & chorus
3	Kyun Jagate Ho Mere Seenay Mein Armano Ko	Naheed Niazi
4	So Ja, So Ja, Dard Bharay Dil	Safdar Hussain, Naheed Niazi
5	Koi Kisi Ko Jalata Hai, Koi Jalta Hai	Munir Hussain
