= Farangi (film) =

1964 film

- فرنگی
- Directed by: Khalil Qaiser
- Written by: Riaz Shahid
- Produced by: Khalil Qaiser
- Starring: Sudhir; Shamim Ara; Agha Talish; Bahar Begum; Allauddin; Mazhar Shah
- Cinematography: Kamran Mirza
- Music by: Rashid Attre
- Production company: K. K. Productions
- Release date: 18 December 1964
- Country: Pakistan
- Language: Urdu

Farangi is a 1964 Pakistani Urdu film directed by Khalil Qaiser and written by Riaz Shahid. It was the second film produced by Qaiser's newly formed K. K. Productions. The film stars Sudhir, Shamim Ara and Agha Talish with Bahar Begum and Allauddin.

Set in 1910s and 1920s during the British Raj, Farangi revolves around the battle of a Pashtun freedom fighter against the British army. The film was a golden jubilee success and features some memorable poems by Faiz Ahmad Faiz and Sahir Ludhianvi, with music composed by Rashid Attre. Ara and Talish's performances in the film were praised.

At Nigar Awards 1964, the film received four awards including Best Actress for Shamim Ara.

== Plot ==
At the time of British Raj, Akbar who hails from the tribal areas goes to his house for a week's leave. On arrival, his mother tells him that she has fixed her marriage with Zeba. He first refuses to marry her because he loves Gul, but later agrees when he comes across Nadir Khan, who also wants to marry her. At his return to the army's fort, the Major of the army compels him to assist them in attacking his village but he rebels, manages to escape and start disrupting their plans. In the army's attack on the village, Zeba and her son survive but Gul goes blind.

Many years pass and Akbar, now a rebellious fighter who kills the army's soldiers one day comes across Gul by chance. When she learns that he is fighting against the enemy, she decides to help him in every possible way. They meet in a cave where Gul regularly informs him about the situation.

When army Major comes to know that the rebellious fighter who is killing their soldiers is Akbar, he kidnaps Gul and her father. He asks her about Akbar's whereabouts but she doesn't tell anything. They kill her father and she herself suffers a lot but doesn't reveal the information that the army seeks.

On the other hand, Nadir Khan who works for British army kills Zeba when she tries to save Saleem, her son. Saleem escapes but again meets with Nadir Khan who brings him in his house where his mother lives. Nadir Khan's mother who is a determined Pashtun lady, kills her own son when he tries to kill Akbar. There, she gathers the villagers and said them to stand by Akbar Khan as he is fighting fir their freedom.

After Nadir Khan's death, the Major imprisons his mother and demand the release of his officer which Akbar has arrested. When Major comes to receive his officer he surprises to know that Akbar Khan is not alone. He goes to the fort where Akbar also follows him along with the villagers who fight the army, defeat them and Akbar kills the Major.

== Cast ==
- Sudhir as Akbar Khan
- Shamim Ara as Gul
- Agha Talish as Major of British army
- Bahar Begum as Zeba
- Allauddin
- Mazhar Shah
- Saqi
- Safia Moini

== Soundtrack and music ==
The music of the film was composed by Rashid Attre while lyrics were penned by Faiz Ahmed Faiz, Sahir Ludhianvi and Qateel Shifai.

=== Track listing ===
Song	Singer	Lyricist
Teri Zaat Hai Mazhar-e-Noor-e-Khuda	Noor Jehan	Qateel Shifai
Aa Bhi Ja Dildara, Jab Say Tu Bichra HaI Mujh Se	Naseem Begum	Qateel Shifai
Ham Jo Tareek Rahon Mein Maray Gaye	Mala Begum and co.	Faiz Ahmed Faiz
Chor Kalai Moray Sanwaria	Naseem Begum	Qateel Shifai
Gullon Mein Rang Bharay, Bad-e-Nobahar Chalay	Mehdi Hassan	Faiz Ahmed Faiz
Teri Us Nigah Ka Shukria, Mujhay Jis Nay Jeena Sikha Diya	Naseem Begum	Qateel Shafai
Ban Kay Mera Parwana, Aye Ga Akbar Khana	Mala Begum	Qateel Shifai
Aye Watan, Marnay Walon Ki Dam Torti Arzoo Dekh	Ahmed Rushdi	Sahir Ludhianvi

== Release and box office ==
Farangi was released on 18 December 1964 and ran for 25 weeks in the theaters of Karachi, thus became a golden Jubilee success.

== Awards ==
Farangi received 4 Nigar Awards in the following categories:

Category	Awardee
Best actress	Shamim Ara
Best script writer	Riaz Shahid
Best lyricist	Faiz Ahmad Faiz
Best male playback singer	Mehdi Hassan
