= Nagin (1959 film) =

1959 film

- Directed by: Khalil Qaiser
- Written by: Aziz Meeruti
- Produced by: Wazir Ali
- Starring: Neelo; Rattan Kumar; Yousuf Khan; Nazar; Husna; Saqi
- Music by: Safdar Hussain
- Release date: 18 June 1959
- Country: Pakistan
- Language: Urdu

Nagin is a 1959 Pakistani musical film, directed by Khalil Qaiser and was his first Urdu film as a director.

It was produced by Wazir Ali. It stars Neelo in the title role and her first leading role with Rattan Kumar in his first leading role as an adult, so far he had done many acting roles as a child actor both in India and Pakistan. It also marked his second appearance in dual role in Pakistani cinema.

Nagin won a Nigar Award in the category of 'Best Director'.

This 1959 film proved to be a breakthrough for Neelo's career.

== Cast ==
- Neelo
- Rattan Kumar
- Husna
- Yousuf Khan
- Nazar
- Saqi

== Music ==
All lyrics are written by Qateel Shifai; all music is composed by Safdar Hussain

Nagin
| No. | Title | Singer (s) | Length |
|---|---|---|---|
| 1. | "Sayyaan Ji Ko Dhoondne Chali" | Naheed Niazi |
| 2. | "Baan Naino Ke Seenay Pe Marun Gi" | Iqbal Bano |
| 3. | "Ambwa Ki Dharion Pe Jhulna Jhula Ja" | Iqbal Bano |
| 4. | "Rutt Rutt Rang Badalta Mela" | Saleem Raza |
| 5. | "Mohay Kesa Jobanwa Ka Chor Mila Re" | Zubaida Khanum |
| 6. | "Mera Pyar Haar Gaya Re" | Zubaida Khanum |

== Release ==
The film was released on 18 June 1950, on the occasion of Eid-ul-Adha in the cinemas of Karachi.

== Awards ==
| Year | Awards | Category | Awardee | Result | Ref. |
|---|---|---|---|---|---|
| 1959 | Nigar Awards | Best Film Director | Khalil Qaiser | Won | |
