= Saloni (actress) =

Pakistani actress

- Born: Zohra Begum; 26 April 1950; Hyderabad, Sindh, Pakistan
- Died: 15 October 2010 (aged 60); Karachi, Sindh, Pakistan
- Occupation: Actress
- Years active: 1964 – 1979
- Spouse: Ghulam Bari Malik

Zohra Begum, better known as Saloni (Urdu: سالونی; 26 April 1950 – 15 October 2010), was a Pakistani film actress of the late 1960s, and early 1970s. She remained a successful actress and gave numerous successful films.

== Early life and career ==
Born in Hyderabad, Sindh, she started her film career in 1964 with the film Ghaddar, starring Mohammad Ali and Sudhir. She acted in both Punjabi and Urdu films. Chan Makhna, Dil Da Jani, Sajan Piyara and Phannay Khan were among her popular films. She starred alongside prominent heroes like Waheed Murad, Yousuf Khan, Ejaz Durrani and Akmal Khan. Her last film was Amir tay Gharib in 1979.

In the early 1970s, she married Bari Malik, the owner of Bari Film Studios. Saloni was the second wife of Bari Malik and stepmother of Khurram Bari, one of the owners of Bari Studios on Multan Road in Lahore. After a few years of marriage, she announced her retirement from films and left the film industry in 1979. Along with her husband, she moved to Dubai and returned to Pakistan five years prior to her death.

== Death ==
Saloni was visiting her daughter in Karachi, when she died of liver failure there on 15 October 2010. She was laid to rest at Thai Pind, near Firdous Market, Gulberg, Lahore. A few years later on 22 December 2015, her husband, Bari Malik, also died in Lahore at the age of 97.

== Filmography ==
- Ghadaar (1964)
- Aisa Bhi Hota Hai (1965)
- Nache Nagan Bajey Been (1965)
- Khota Paisa (1965)
- Phannay Khan (1965)
- Qabeela (1966)
- Sarhad (1966)
- Baghi Sardar (1966)
- Aadil (1966)
- Koh-e-Noor (1966)
- Lori (1966)
- Janbaaz (1966)
- Elan (1967)
- Dil Da Jani (1967)
- Hatim Tai (1967)
- Baalam (1968)
- Zalim (1968)
- Chann Makhna (1968)
- Badla (1968)
- Sohna (1968)
- Hameeda (1968)
- Dilbar Jani (1969)
- Bhaiyyan Di Jori (1969)
- Shabistan (1969)
- Kochwan (1969)
- Guddo (1970)
- Chor Naaley Chattar (1970)
- Pyar De Palaikhe (1971)
- Sipah Salar (1972)
- Amir tay Gharib (1979) - last film in her career

== See also ==
- List of Lollywood actors
