= Izzat (1960 film) =

- Directed by: Nazir Ajmeri
- Written by: Nazir Ajmeri
- Produced by: Nazir Ajmeri
- Starring: Shamim Ara; Ejaz
- Cinematography: M. Aslam Khan
- Music by: Nazeer Jaffery
- Release date: 8 April 1960
- Country: Pakistan
- Language: Urdu

Izzat is a 1960 Pakistani film directed by Nazir Ajmeri, who also produced it, and wrote its story and screenplay. It stars Shamim Ara and Ejaz. It was a flop film from Shamim Ara's early career.

== Cast ==
- Shamim Ara
- Ejaz
- Habib
- Laila
- Saqi
- Chham Chham

== Soundtrack ==
All music was composed by Nazeer Jaffery, and all lyrics by poet Tufail Hoshiarpuri and Nzaim Panipati.

Song title	Sung by	Lyrics by	Music by
"Aa bhi ja dilruba"	Kausar Parveen	Tufail Hoshiarpuri	Nazeer Jaffery
"Abhi aaya hai un ka pyam, sakhi ri meray naam"	Kausar Parveen	Tufail Hoshiarpuri	Nazeer Jaffery
"Jhoola thandi thandi hawa ne jhulaya hai"	Kausar Parveen	Tufail Hoshiarpuri	Nazeer Jaffery
"Wo jo aayen to akhiyaan bichhaun gi"	Kausar Parveen, Irene Perveen	Nazim Panipati	Nazeer Jaffery
"Saza di hai naseebon ne kisi ilzam se pehle"	Naheed Niazi	Tufail Hoshiarpuri	Nazeer Jaffery
"Boliye na boliye, hum tumhare hain"	Naheed Niazi	Tufail Hoshiarpuri	Nazeer Jaffery
"Sola baras ki chhori, chand si gori"	Naseem Begum	Tufail Hoshiarpuri	Nazeer Jaffery
