= Zehr-e-Ishq =

1958 film

- Directed by: Masood Parvez
- Written by: Khwaja Khurshid Anwar
- Produced by: Sultan Jeelani; Khwaja Khurshid Anwar
- Starring: Musarrat Nazir; Habib-ur-Rehman; Yasmin; Bibbo; Allauddin; Shamim Bano
- Cinematography: Nabi Ahmad
- Music by: Khwaja Khurshid Anwar
- Release date: 21 April 1958
- Country: Pakistan
- Language: Urdu

Zehr-e-Ishq (Urdu: زہر ِعشق, lit. 'The Poison Of Love') is a Pakistani romantic musical film released in 1958. Following Intezaar, Zehr-e-Ishq is the second film featuring Masood Parvez as a director, Khwaja Khurshid Anwar as a producer, music composer and writer, Qateel Shifai as a lyricist, and Syed Imtiaz Ali Taj as a screenwriter. Musarrat Nazir, Habib ur Rehman and Yasmin appeared in lead roles in the film.

== Plot ==
Sanwali belongs to a Sapera tribe and is madly in love with Jamil. But Jamil's mother is against this relationship and fixes Jamil's engagement with his cousin Salma, against his wish. Sanwali's father too tries to marry her with someone but she doesn't allow him to do. She plans to marry him by fleeing off from house but fails as his father locks her in the room. He marries her with a guy of their tribe by intoxicating her.

When Sanwali does not reach there, Jamil considers her as a disloyal and marries Salam. On his marriage, Sanwali's sister Ratti tells him what happened to her. He then falls ill due to restlessness but recovers later when Sanwali comes to him after killing her husband by pushing from the hill. She then threatens Salam to leave Jamil, to which she decides to leave him for his happiness. On leaving his house, she meets with an accidental and her face bruns completely. She denies her secretary to tell anybody about her survival.

Jamil marries Sanwali and starts living with her, leaving his mother and his son from Salma alone. He tries to convince Sanwali to adopt his son to which she first denies but later accepts on the insistence of her sister and father. He goes to bring his son but his mother refuses flatly which saddens him in his memory. For the sake of his happiness, one day Sawanli secretly goes to his mother's house where she catches her. They both argue there and end up on quarrel when Jamil's mother falls and dies. She then brings the child to her house to Jamil.

On observing, Jamil's increasing affection for his son she decides to kill him by falling him from the mountain but changes his decision when the child calls her by saying "mother". The child then Suffers from pneumonia and Salma comes to see him one night, who keeps coming to see her son even before. Sanwali catches her and suggests her to take him with her. But she then recognizes her, and decides to kill her son. She just starts to poison him when the child calls her "mother", she stops and drinks the poison herself.

== Cast ==
- Musarrat Nazir as Sanwali
- Habib-ur-Rehman as Jamil
- Yasmin as Salma
- Bibbo as Jamil's mother
- Shamim Bano as Aapa
- Nusrat Kardar
- Neelo as Ratti, Sanwali's sister
- M. Ismail as Salma's secretary
- Sultan Rahi (extra)

== Release ==
Zehr-e-Ishq was released on 21 April 1958 in Karachi cinemas and did 'average' amount of business at the box office.

== Soundtrack ==
All lyrics are written by Qateel Shifai; all music is composed by Khwaja Khurshid Anwar

No.	Title	Singer (s)	Length
1.	"Janay na dun gi, main janay na dun gi"	Kausar Parveen
2.	"Pal pal jhoomu, jhoom ke gaun"	Kausar Parveen
3.	"Dekho ji, bedardi sayya, ja ke nahin aaye"	Naheed Niazi
4.	"Mohay piya millan ko jane de"	Naheed Niazi
5.	"Chham chham nachun, meray piya ghar aye"	Zubaida Khanum
6.	"Raat chandni, main akeli"	Zubaida Khanum
7.	"Un se bichar kar, ye jeena bhi, aye dil koi jeena hai"	Zubaida Khanum
8.	"So ja ray, so ja, lal hamaray, raj dularay"	Zubaida Khanum
9.	"Suno arz meri Kamli wale"	Zubaida Khanam

== Awards ==
The film won four Nigar Awards in the following categories:

Category	Recipient
Best Actress	Musarrat Nazir
Best Supporting Actress	Bibbo
Best Music	Khwaja Khurshid Anwar
Best Supporting Actress	Shamim Bano
Best Sound	Afzal Husain
