= Qamar Ajnalvi =

- قمر اجنالوی
- Born: Abdus Sattar; July 1919; Ajnala
- Died: 30 May 1993 (aged 73); Germany
- Resting place: Rabwah, Pakistan
- Spouse: Amtul Hafeez
- Children: Qamar Mamoon, Qamar Haroon, Naeem Qamar, Mueen Qamar, Parween Qamar
- Relatives: Bashiran Begum (sister), Abdul Qadir (nephew), Nasra Zaheer (niece)
- Writing career
- Notable works: Qasidah banam khair ul Anaam, Chah babul, Dharti ka safar, Baghdad ki raat, Jahan-e-loh-o-qalam

Qamar Ajnalvi (قمر اجنالوی), born Abdus Sattar (July 1919 – 30 May 1993), was a Pakistani novelist, poet, movies script and story writer who wrote in the Urdu language. He was born in Ajnala, Amritsar district, British India. He was the only son of his father, Din Muhammad. He moved to Lahore in 1940. He wrote his first historical novel, Shaheed Pujaran, in 1938. Qamar Ajnalvi was married to Begum Amtul Hafeez on 31 December 1944. They had 3 sons together.

== Works ==
Ajnalvi wrote the script of several Pakistani Urdu movies which include: Maan Baap, Laila Majnoo, Buzdil, Dillan wich Rab wasda, and Mein Ney Kia Jurm Kia. He also wrote dialogue for the movie Anarkali and several others. His famous historical novels include: Shaheed Pujaran, Maarka Panipat, Inqlab-e-Turki, Baghi Sardar, Parthal, Ghazala, Urkhan-ul-Ghazi, Sultan, Wali Ehad, Jang-e-Muqaddas, Pandarey, Muqaddas Moorti, Chah-e-Babul, Baghdad Ki Raat, Lala-Rukh, and Dharti Ka Safar.

He also wrote a novel on world politics, Jahan-e-loh-o-qalam.
