= Zarqa (film) =

1969 Pakistani Urdu film

- Directed by: Riaz Shahid
- Written by: Riaz Shahid
- Screenplay by: Riaz Shahid
- Based on: Based on the life of Zarqa (Note: Zarqa was a Palestinian freedom activist)
- Produced by: Riaz Shahid
- Starring: Neelo; Alauddin; Ejaz Durrani; Saqi; Nasira; Talish
- Music by: Rashid Attre; Wajahat Attre
- Release date: 17 October 1969 (Pakistan)
- Country: Pakistan
- Language: Urdu

Zarqa is a 1969 Pakistani epic historical drama film directed, produced and written by Riaz Shahid while the music is composed by Rashid Attre and Wajahat Attre. It features Neelo, Alauddin, Ejaz Durrani, Saqi and Nasira as protagonist characters. It is based on the life of Zarqa, a Palestinian dancer girl and a freedom activist, who killed herself for the liberation of Palestine involving Israeli-occupied territories and Palestinian liberation movement. It also addresses a real event of Neelo when she was forcibly invited by Nawab Malik Amir Mohammad Khan, the governor of West Pakistan to his office to perform a stage dance during the 1965's official visit of Mohammad Reza Pahlavi to Pakistan.

It was termed as a propaganda film at that time, primarily due to its depiction of the Palestinian freedom of movement, and lately when it was attempted to distribute it in Middle East through a guerilla organisation of the Palestine. In 2002, the film was featured in British Film Institute's poll (both critics and viewers' polls) of "Top Ten Pakistani Films of all times".

== Release ==
The film was released on October 17, 1969. In 2017, the Lok Virsa Museum, dedicated to keep historical film records screened the film. It is recognized as the first diamond jubilee film in the history of Pakistani cinema. Primarily known for music blockbuster lyrics from the poems of Habib Jalib, Zarqa filmmakers have reportedly introduced a "propaganda-laden" story in the film. By the latter, the film director made controversial attempts when he offered film distribution of Zarqa for the Middle East through Al Fatah, a guerrilla organisation of Palestinian.

== Plot ==
The film revolves around an Arabian dancer girl Zarqa who joins Palestine Liberation Organization and commits suicide aimed at to harm Israeli Army deployed in the State of Palestine. Film story starts with an old man who addresses a public gathering in 1969 and a group of Palestinian people listens to his story about a woman, Zarqa while a Palestinian leader Shabaan Lutfi recruits the people to the resistance movement.

== Cast ==
- Neelo as Zarqa
- Talish as Major David
- Alauddin as Shabaan Lutfi
- Ejaz
- Nasira
- Saqi
- ChhamChham
- Zulfi
- Fomi
- Ijaz Akhtar
- Kemal Irani
- Fazal Haq
- M.D. Sheikh
- Taya Barkat
- Raj Multani
- Hamid

== Soundtrack ==
All music is composed by Wajahat Attray and Rashid Attre.

Zarqa
No.	Title	Lyrics	Singer (s)	Length
1.	"Raqs Zanjeer Pehan Kar"	Habib Jalib	Mehdi Hassan, Naseem Begum

- A Gham-e-Jahan Naach, Khalq-e-BeZaban Naach, Naach, Naach, Naach... Singer(s): Mala, Munir Hussain
- Azadi Ki Roshani Lo... Singer(s): Munir Hussain, Mala
- Hamen Yaqeen Hay, Dhalay Gi Ik Din.. A Falastine... Singer(s): Munir Hussain, Naseem Begum & Co.
- Jalti Aag Ko Shama Bana Kar Raqs Karay Parwana... Singer(s): Munir Hussain, Mala & Co.
- Main Phool Baichnay Ayi, Main Tor Kay Bulbul Ka Dil... Singer(s): Naseem Begum
- Raqs, Zanjeer Pehan Kar Bhi Kiya Jata Hay... Singer(s): Mehdi Hassan
- Ya Abbi, Ya Rafiq.. Qais Hay Tu, Tu Hay Sehra, Tu Hay Mehmal... Singer(s): Naseem Begum & Co.
- Ya Zarqa.. Mera Dil Tha BeQarar, Tha Tumhara Intezar... Singer(s): Munir Hussain, Naseem Begum

== Awards and recognition ==
- Nigar Awards in 1969 for 'Best Film', 'Best Director', 'Best Script', 'Best Actress', 'Best Lyrics' and 'Best Male Singer'.
