= Rahim Gul =

Pakistani writer, film director and film producer

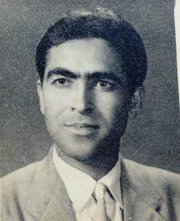
- Born: 1924; Shakardara, Kohat, Pakistan
- Died: 28 April 1985 Lahore, Pakistan
- Occupations: writer, film director, film producer

Rahim Gul (1924 – 28 April 1985) was a famous Urdu language Pakistani writer, literary critic, author and director and producer of films.

With various books of fiction, criticism, biography and art to his credit, Rahim Gul was a major figure in contemporary Urdu literature. He is best known for his last and the most widely read novel "Jannat Ki Talash".

== Early life ==
Rahim Gul was born in Shakardara, Kohat, Khyber Pakhtunkhwa, Pakistan. He received his early education from Kohat and joined British Army in 1941, then remained engaged in Burma fronts during the Second World War. Soon after the end of war, he left the army and settled in Lahore, Pakistan and started writing for various magazines and papers.

== Career ==
Rahim Gul is the author of books and has been honored with Adamjee Literary Award on his book " Dastan Chour Aey". He wrote, directed and produced various Urdu and Pashto films. Before his death in 1985, he had been writing columns in Daily Jang, an Urdu language newspaper, for many years.

== Death ==
Rahim Gul died on 28 April 1985 due to kidney failure at Sir Ganga Ram Hospital, Lahore.

== Books ==
- Woh Ajnabi Apna
- Peyyas Ka Darya
- Zehr Ka Darya
- Dastan Chhor Aey (Biography) (Adamjee Award)
- Tun Tara Ra
- Jannat Ke Talash
- Wadi e Gumaan Main
- Khad o Khal
- Portraits
- Tarranum
- Sarhadi Uqab

== Filmography ==
- Lagan (1960) (Urdu)
- Habu (1961) (Urdu)
- Baarat (1963) (Urdu)
- Misal (1966) (Urdu)
- Ajab Khan Afridi (1971) (Pashto)
- Musa Khan Gul Makai (1971) (Pashto language)
- Ahtejaj (1979) (Urdu)
- Ahtjaj (1978) (Urdu)
- Rivaj (1979) (Pashto)
