= Musarrat Nazir =

Film actress and singer (born 1940)

- Born: Musarrat Nazir Khawaja; 13 October 1940 (age 85); Lahore, Punjab, British India
- Other names: The Silver Screen's Sparkling Star; Chandni
- Education: Kinnaird College
- Occupations: Singer; film director; film actress
- Years active: 1951 – 1993
- Known for: Film actress; Punjabi folk music
- Spouse: Arshad Majeed (m. 1963)
- Children: 3, including Omar Majeed
- Relatives: Ahmad Bashir (cousin); Parveen Atif (cousin); Bushra Ansari (niece); Sumbul Shahid (niece); Neelam Bashir (niece); Asma Abbas (niece); Syed Iftikhar Hussain Gillani (brother-in-law); Ameer Gilani (grand-nephew); Zara Noor Abbas (grand-niece)
- Awards: Pride of Performance Award by the President of Pakistan in 1989

Musarrat Nazir Khawaja (Urdu: مسرت نذیر; born 13 October 1940) is a Pakistani singer and film actress. She was one of the leading actresses of Pakistani cinema, acting in both Urdu and Punjabi films during the 1950s and 1960s. She is known as The Silver Screen's Sparkling Star. Many years later, she returned to the industry, focusing on singing, particularly wedding and folk songs. Her accolades include three Nigar Awards and a Pride of Performance.

Nazir made her acting debut with Anwar Kamal Pasha's Qaatil (1955) in a supporting role. Her portrayals in the commercially successful Punjabi romance-dramas Pattan (1955), Mahi Munda (1956), Yakke Wali (1957), and the partition-themed Kartar Singh (1959) cemented her career as a leading actress. For her performances in Zehr-e-Ishq (1958), Jhoomer (1959), and Shaheed (1962), she won three Nigar Awards for Best Actress. Nazir then took retirement from acting and shifted to Canada with her husband, returning to Pakistan in the 1970s. During that period, she pursued a career in singing, focusing on folk wedding songs and ghazals, among other genres.

== Early life ==
Nazir was born on October 13, 1940. Hailing from a middle-class Kashmiri Punjabi family in Lahore, her father, Khwaja Nazir Ahmed, worked as a registered contractor in the Lahore Municipal Corporation. Early in her life, her parents wanted her to be a doctor, and provided her with the best possible education they could afford. Nazir passed the matriculation examination with distinction and passed the intermediate examination from Kinnaird College in Lahore.

== Career ==
She had keen interest in music and began singing for Radio Pakistan in the early 1950s. However, insufficient money from the radio took her to the film director Anwar Kamal Pasha in 1955. She explained to Pasha her strong desire to sing for his movies. Instead, Pasha suggested that she should become an actress. Musarrat needed her parents' approval. Pasha himself met Musarrat's father and convinced him to allow his daughter to work in the movie industry as a singer and actress.

Pasha changed Musarrat's name to her professional name Chandani and signed her up for a side role in his movie. Hence, Chandani made her debut with Sabiha Khanum and Nayyar Sultana in Pasha's film Qatil in 1955. Her role was secondary but effective.

On the advice of his friend, poet and script writer, Baba Aalam Siah Posh, Sheikh Lateef of Capital Films, Lahore cast Chandani (Musarrat Nazir) in the Punjabi Pattan (1955). This was her debut in Punjabi films under her real name, Musarrat Nazir, as she played the lead role opposite Santosh Kumar. The producer was Sheikh Lateef and the film was directed by Luqman. The film Pattan opened the doors for Musarrat in the Punjabi film industry, which led her to the hit film Patay Khan (1955). She was the supporting actress. The film was produced by film actress Shammi and Musarrat Nazir acted in a supporting role along with Noor Jehan and Aslam Pervaiz. Her main competitor actresses, in those days, were Sabiha Khanum, Asha Posley, Bahar Begum, Nayyar Sultana, Jamila Razzaq, Yasmin, Neelo and Noor Jehan.

Musarrat also gave performances in Pakistan cinema's greatest melodramas like the films Mahi Munda (1956) and Yakke Wali (1957).

The film song Us bay wafa ka sheher hai in the film Shaheed (1962), is considered to be one of the popular songs in 2022. Even after she retired from her film career in 1988, she had continued to sing for Pakistan Television until recently.

== Personal life ==
Nazir married physician Arshad Majeed and relocated to Canada in 1965. The couple has three children, including son Omar Majeed, a film director. Nazir chose to abandon her thriving film career to accompany her husband, prioritizing her personal life.

In late 1970s, the couple planned to return to Pakistan and settle in Lahore. Majeed intended to set up a hospital in Lahore and they purchased a home for this purpose. However, after investing significant time and resources, the project was abandoned.

== Filmography ==
=== Television ===
Year	Title	Role	Network
1983	Tariq Aziz Show	Herself	PTV
1984	20 Golden Years Of PTV	Herself	PTV
1986	Mehmil	Herself	PTV

=== Film ===
Year	Film	Language
1955	Qatil	Urdu
1955	Pattan	Punjabi
1955	Paatay Khan	Punjabi
1956	Mahi Munda	Punjabi
1956	Kismet	Urdu
1956	Peegan	Punjabi
1956	Mirza Sahiban	Urdu
1956	Baghi	Urdu
1956	Guddi Gudda	Punjabi
1957	Seestan	Urdu
1957	Yakke Wali	Punjabi
1957	Palkaan	Punjabi
1957	Thandi Sarak	Urdu
1957	Aankh Ka Nasha	Urdu
1957	Sethi	Punjabi
1957	Baap Ka Gunah	Urdu
1958	Naya Zamana	Urdu
1958	Jaan-E-Bahar	Urdu
1958	Zehr-e-Ishq	Urdu
1958	Jatti	Punjabi
1958	Rukhsana	Urdu
1959	Society	Urdu
1959	Sahara	Urdu
1959	16 Aanay	Urdu
1959	Yaar Beli	Punjabi
1959	Kartar Singh	Punjabi
1959	Raaz	Urdu
1959	Lukkan Meeti	Punjabi
1959	Jaidad	Punjabi
1959	Jhoomer	Urdu
1960	Clerk	Urdu
1960	Street 77	Urdu
1960	Gul Badan	Urdu
1960	Noukari	Urdu
1960	Watan	Urdu
1960	Dil-e-Nadan	Urdu
1960	Daku Ki Larki	Urdu
1961	Chotay Sarkaar	Urdu
1961	Sunehray Sapnay	Urdu
1961	Mangol	Urdu
1961	Muftbar	Punjabi
1961	Gulfam	Urdu
1962	Shaheed	Urdu
1962	Ek Manzil 2 Rahen	Urdu
1963	Ishq Par Zor Nahin	Urdu
1967	Bahadur	Urdu
1970	Shanakhat Parade	Punjabi
1988	Da Bhabhi Bangri	Pashto

== Discography ==
Musarrat Nazir made an appearance on Pakistani television's Tariq Aziz Show in 1983. Songs from that show became highly popular in Pakistan.

Her popular songs are listed below:

- Gulshan Ki Baharon Mein
- Mera Laung Gawacha (1983), song lyrics by Khawaja Pervez was a runaway hit song
- Chalay To Kat Hi Jaaye Ga Safar Aahistah, Aahistah
- Apnay Haathoan Ki Lakiroan Mein
- Lathe Di Chader Uttay Saleti Rung Mahiya, a traditional folk song of Punjab
- Chitta Kukkar Banairey Tay
- Mehndi Ni Mehndi
- Jogi Uttar Paharon Aaya (1985)
- Mein Kamli Da Dhola

== Awards and recognition ==
Year	Award	Category	Result	Title	Ref.
1958	Nigar Awards	Best Actress	Won	Zehr-e-Ishq	
1959	Nigar Awards	Best Actress	Won	Jhoomer	
1962	Nigar Awards	Best Actress	Won	Shaheed	
1989	Pride of Performance	Award by the Government of Pakistan	Won	Contribution to Cinema Industry	

== In popular culture ==
- Bushra Ansari parodied her singing style and songs several times.
- In 2021, Atif Aslam paid tribute to her recreating her song "Chale To Kat Hi Jayega Safar".
- In 2022, Syra Yousuf recreates Nazir's look from her famous song "Mera Long Gawacha" for a brand campaign.
