= Deeba =

Pakistani film actress (born 1947)

- دِیبا
- Born: Raheela Begum; 1 August 1947 (age 78); Ranchi, Bihar,(present-day Jharkhand), British India
- Other name: Pakistani Mona Lisa
- Occupations: Film actress; TV Actress
- Years active: 1956 – present
- Spouse: Naeem Rizvi (m. 1971–2016)
- Children: Madiha Rizvi (daughter); Imran Rizvi (son)
- Relatives: Hassan Noman (son-in-law)
- Awards: Pride of Performance (2020); Nigar Award: Special Award for Sajna Door Diya (1970)

Deeba (Urdu: دِیبا; born 1 August 1947) is a Pakistani actress of the 1960s and 1970s. She is known for her romantic and tragic roles in Urdu and Punjabi films and for her iconic beauty, earning her the nickname the Pakistani Mona Lisa. Deeba also received two major awards: the Nigar Award and the Pride of Performance.

== Early life and career ==
Named Raheela at birth, Deeba was born in Ranchi, Bihar, British India, on 1 August 1947. In the 1950s, she was living with her married sister near Karachi Cantonment railway station in a slum area of Karachi. She started her career as a child actress in the film Miss 56 (1956) and was nicknamed "Chutanki" as she was still a little girl.

She got a breakthrough in Chiragh Jalta Raha (1962), a Fazal Ahmad Karim Fazli film. Her performances in several films, such as Milan (1964), Khamosh Raho (1964), Aina (1966), Payal ki jhankar (1966), Doraha, Sangdil (1968), Dard (1969), Sajna Door Diya (1970), Neend Hamari Khwab Tumhare (1971), Ansoo (1971), Pardes (1972), and Seeta Maryam Margaret (1978), have won critical acclaim. She played many supporting characters, including the on-screen mother, in several films throughout most of the 1980s and 1990s. She acted in several television plays in the early 2000s.

== Personal life ==
=== Childhood tragedy ===
As a child, Deeba lost her father, and her mother was separated from her during the partition of British India into Pakistan and India. She was taken to Karachi by her aunt and uncle, not knowing the fate of her mother until she became a film actress. In 1964, during the filming of her movie "Milan", her picture was published in a Dhaka film magazine. Her mother saw that picture and recognized her as her daughter Raheela. The Bengali writer Mohiuddin Nawab, who happened to be a neighbor of Deeba's mother in Dhaka, heard her story and wrote to the magazine. When Deeba saw an article about her mother in a magazine, she immediately began searching for her and eventually found her in Pakistan. After reuniting, she brought her mother with her to Lahore, where she continued her film career.

=== Marriage ===
Deeba married cameraman Naeem Rizvi in 1971 and left the silver screen for 10 years. However, financial hardships made her join the Pakistani film industry again in 1987 as a supporting actress. She has three children, including daughter Madiha Rizvi and son Imran Rizvi, who are both actors.

== List of television projects ==
=== Television series ===
Year	Title	Role	Network
1999	Boota from Toba Tek Singh	Zohra Begum	PTV
2004	Moorat	Sughra	ARY Digital
2005	Riyasat	Shahnawaz's wife	ARY Digital
2006	Manzil	Mahjabeen	ARY Digital
2007	Khuda Gawah	Saman's mother	ATV
2007	Sarkar Sahab	Shahi	ARY Digital
2012	Saheliyan	Nani	PTV

=== Telefilm ===
Year	Title	Role
2004	Mother of Desert	Shabbir's mother

== Filmography ==
=== Film ===
Year	Film	Language
1956	Miss 56	Urdu
1959	Faisla	Urdu
1962	Chiragh Jalta Raha	Urdu
1962	Dosheeza	Urdu
1962	Mehboob	Urdu
1963	Jab Say Dekha Hay Tumhen	Urdu
1963	Sazish	Urdu
1964	Milan	Bengali
1964	Chingari	Urdu
1965	Riwaj	Urdu
1965	Dil Ke Tukre	Urdu
1965	Sartaj	Urdu
1965	Ham Matwalay Nojawan	Urdu
1965	Zamin	Urdu
1966	Payal Ki Jhankaar	Urdu
1966	Aina	Urdu
1967	Phir Subah Hogi	Urdu
1968	Sangdil	Urdu
1968	Behan Bhai	Urdu
1969	Ishara	Urdu
1969	C.I.D.	Urdu
1969	Tumhi Ho Mehboob Meray	Urdu
1969	Dard	Urdu
1969	Ghar Damaad	Urdu
1969	Aneela	Urdu
1969	Buzdil	Urdu
1970	Afsana	Urdu
1970	Sajnan Door Dia	Punjabi
1970	Anjuman	Urdu
1971	Neend Humari Khawab Tumharay	Urdu
1971	Aansoo	Urdu
1972	Zindgi Ek Safar Hai	Urdu
1972	Ek Raat	Urdu
1974	Shama	Urdu
1974	Haqeeqat	Urdu
1975	Saajan Rang Rangeela	Urdu
1975	Haku	Punjabi
1975	Jageer	Urdu
1975	Ajj Di Gall	Punjabi
1975	Shikwa	Urdu
1975	Nakabandi	Punjabi
1975	Ajnabi	Urdu
1976	Koshish	Urdu
1977	Sadqay Teri Mout Tun	Punjabi
1978	Amber	Urdu
1978	Seeta Maryam Margaret	Urdu
1979	Goga Sher	Punjabi
1979	Nishana	Urdu
1980	Zamir	Urdu
1980	Double Cross	Urdu
1980	Nahin Abhi Nahin	Urdu
1981	Qurbani	Urdu
1981	Athra Tay Jeedar	Punjabi
1983	Aakhri Dushman	Punjabi
1984	Chor Chokidar	Punjabi
1985	Da Veenay Daray	Pashto
1987	Mera Insaf	Urdu
1988	Sakhi Daata	Punjabi
1988	Dushman Dada	Pashto
1988	Roti	Punjabi
1989	Kraye Kay Qatil	Urdu
1989	Miss Allah Rakhi	Punjabi
1989	Mera Challenge	Punjabi
1989	Inteqam Ham Lain Gay	Urdu
1990	Sarmaya	Punjabi
1991	Watan Kay Rakhwalay	Punjabi / Urdu
1992	Muhib Sheedi	Sindhi
1993	Mr. Charlie	Urdu
1993	Khuda Gawah	Punjabi / Urdu
1993	Daku, Chor, Siphai	Punjabi / Urdu
1993	Ilzam	Punjabi / Urdu
1993	No Baby No	Punjabi / Urdu
1993	Mr. Tabedar	Urdu
1994	International Luteray	Punjabi / Urdu
1995	Jeeva	Urdu
1995	Gabhar Singh	Punjabi
1995	Main Nay Pyar Kiya	Punjabi / Urdu
1995	Sargam	Urdu
1995	Panah	Urdu
1996	Hawaen	Urdu
1997	Karam Data	Punjabi / Urdu
1997	Deevanay Teray Pyar Kay	Urdu
1998	Deewaren	Urdu
1998	Nikah	Urdu
1998	Dulha Lay Kay Jaun Gi	Urdu
1998	Choorian	Punjabi
1999	Nikki Jei Haan	Punjabi
1999	Ik Pagal Si Larki	Urdu
1999	Jazba	Urdu
1999	Pal Do Pal	Urdu
2000	Angaray	Urdu
2000	Yaar Badshah	Punjabi
2000	Pehchan	Urdu
2000	Meri Touba	Punjabi
2001	Khoye Ho Tum Kahan	Urdu
2001	Aaj Ki Larki	Urdu
2001	Sapnay Apnay Apnay	Urdu
2002	Kon Banay Ga Karorpati	Urdu
2002	Fire	Urdu
2008	Zill-e-Shah	Punjabi

== Awards and recognition ==
Year	Award	Category	Result	Title	Ref.
1970	Nigar Award	Special Award	Won	Sajna Door Diya	
2020	Pride of Performance	Award by the President of Pakistan	Won	Herself	

== See also ==
- List of Pakistani actresses
