= Riaz Shahid =

Pakistani film director (1927–1972)

Riaz Shahid ریاض شاہد
- Born: 1927; Quetta, British India
- Died: 1 October 1972 (aged 44–45); Lahore, Pakistan
- Occupations: Film Director; Screenwriter; Journalist
- Years active: 1962–1972
- Children: Shaan Shahid
- Awards: 12 Nigar Awards Sitara-i-Imtiaz (2023)

Riaz Shahid (1927 – 1 October 1972) was a Pakistani filmmaker, film writer, and journalist.

Influenced by poet Habib Jalib, who would later become a friend, Shahid frequently engaged with political activists at socialist gatherings in Lahore, and his support for the Pan-Islamic causes of Palestine, Algeria, and Kashmir would be reflected in his filmography.

== Early life and education ==
Riaz Shahid was born in 1927 in Quetta, British India. He belonged to an ethnic Kashmiri family. He was the father of a famous Pakistani film star Shaan Shahid. Shaan was only one year old, when his father died. His real name was Sheikh Riaz, but became known by his nickname Shahid. He was educated at Islamia College, Lahore, Pakistan.

== Writing career ==
Riaz lived in Lahore where he started his career as a journalist for the newspaper Chataan and later joined Faiz Ahmed Faiz's Lail-o-Nihar.

He authored the Urdu novel Hazaar Dastaan (A Thousand Tales) in 1955, a social realist narrative set in post-Partition Lahore, addressing themes of poverty, inequality, and political disillusionment. After reading the novel, Faiz Ahmed Faiz convinced him to work in films. Though largely forgotten for decades, the novel was rediscovered and republished in 2024 by a group of literary scholars and activists, sparking renewed interest in Shahid’s contributions to literature.

== Film career ==
Riaz Shahid was introduced as a story and dialogue writer to the Pakistani film industry by his friend, actor Allauddin, in film Bharosa (1958). In 1962, Riaz started his film career as a director for the film Susral (1962). Collaborating with the noted progressive poet, Habib Jalib, he went on to write or direct several films like Zarqa (1969), Shaheed (1962), Farangi (1964), Khamosh Raho (1964) and Yeh Aman (1971).

Riaz Shahid was married to then famous actress Neelo and had three children. The eldest was their daughter Zarqa, followed by two sons, Shaan, who is a well-known Pakistani film actor and Sarosh, who also worked in a couple of Pakistani movies.

== Death and legacy ==
Riaz Shahid died of leukemia on 1 October 1972 at Lahore, Pakistan.

A noted Pakistani film actress and director Sangeeta is quoted as saying, "Riaz Shahid was a visionary. Whatever is happening in Kashmir today, he showed it well in the 60s. He was the top director of his period and we should be proud that such people were once a part of our industry".

Another film producer Choudhry Ejaz Kamran reportedly said, "Riaz Shahid stood out for not just his craft but his contribution to meaningful cinema. Cinema that was both political and imppressive. Shahid directed super hit films that are now considered guide books for upcoming film-makers. While he dabbed into a variety of genres, he always preferred to do films based on serious and revolutionary ideas".

== Filmography ==
Year	Title	Director	Producer	Screenwriter	Ref.
1958	Bharosa			Yes	
1959	Neend			Yes	
1960	Clerk			Yes	
1960	Susral	Yes	Yes	Yes	
1962	Shaheed			Yes	
1964	Khamosh Raho			Yes	
1964	Farangi			Yes	
1966	Aag Ka Darya			Yes	
1966	Badnaam			Yes	
1969	Zarqa	Yes	Yes	Yes	
1971	Gharnata	Yes			
1971	Yeh Aman	Yes		Yes	
1974	Bahisht			Yes	
1978	Haider Ali			Yes	

== Awards and recognition ==
=== Nigar Awards ===
==== Best Script Writer ====
- Neend (1959)
- Shaheed (1962)
- Khamosh Raho (1964)
- Zarqa (1969)
- Bahisht (1974)
- Haider Ali (1978)

==== Best Dialogues/Screenplay ====
- Shaheed (1961)
- Shikwa (1963)
- Farangi (1964)
- Yeh Aman (1971)
- Bahisht (1974)

==== Best Director ====
- Zarqa (1969)
