= Ratan Kumar =

Indian and Pakistani actor (1941 - 2016)

- Born: 19 March 1941; Ajmer, Rajputana, British India
- Died: 12 December 2016 (aged 75); California, US
- Occupation: Film actor
- Years active: 1948 – 1969

Ratan Kumar (19 March 1941 – 12 December 2016) was the screen name of the Indian born child artist who later migrated to Pakistan. He acted in Indian and Pakistani movies. He was born as Syed Nazir Ali Rizvi. He is best known for his work in films Boot Polish (1954), Do Bigha Zamin (1953) and Jagriti (1954).

== Early life and career ==
Ratan Kumar was born as Syed Nazir Ali in 1941 in British India. He became the most-sought-after child-actor in India in the 1950s after his initial success in 1952. After making the popular Indian movie Jagriti (1954), Ratan Kumar migrated to Pakistan in 1956, with his family, and remade the movie into Bedari (1957) (Urdu translation of Jagriti or awareness) and used the same old tune for a film song in Pakistan, aimed at igniting a similar emotion and patriotic zeal, among the listeners. Aao bachcho tumhe dikhayen jhaanki Hindustan ki... (come children let us show you glimpses of India), is a popular Hindi film song of the 1950s. Aao bachcho sair karayen tumko Pakistan ki... (children, let us take you on a tour of Pakistan) is an equally hit song of the same period in Pakistan.

He played a young boy's role in many Pakistani films later. Nagin (1959) was the first Pakistani film he played a lead actor opposite Neelo as the lead actress. Ratan Kumar's success, as a lead actor, could not last long because his later films did not do well at the box-office and he eventually faded away.

In 1977, his 4 years old daughter died in an accident in Lahore, Pakistan. He was so emotionally upset after that accident that he decided to quit the Pakistani film industry. In 1979, Ratan Kumar left Pakistan never to return again.

In the late 1960s, Ratan Kumar also got into the business of selling oriental carpets and had started travelling back and forth from Pakistan to Europe for this business. Eventually he ended up settling down permanently in the United States after 1979.

== Death ==
Ratan Kumar was living in California, in his old age, and was admitted to the hospital for pneumonia 10 days before his death on 12 December 2016. He had a long history of illness, though. In 1996, his lungs had collapsed twice in the same year. When they collapsed the third time in 2000, he was left paralyzed and went into a coma for eight days. Then he recovered in four to five months and became somewhat normal again. His survivors include 2 sons, a daughter and seven grandchildren.

== Filmography ==
=== In India ===
- Baiju Bawra (1952)- Ratan Kumar played the role of the child, 'Chote Baiju'
- Do Bigha Zamin (1953)
- Boot Polish (1954)- A film on street kids of Bombay. Ratan Kumar played the role of child
- Angarey (1954)
- Jagriti (1954)
- Bahut Din Huwe (1954) - Madhubala, Ratan Kumar, Agha
- Sargam (1950) - Raj Kapoor, Rehana, Ratan Kumar, Baby Tabassum
- Afsana (1951) - Ashok Kumar, Veena, Pran. Ratan Kumar, Baby Tabassum

=== In Pakistan ===
- Masoom (1957) - Ratan Kumar's first released film in Pakistan
- Bedari (1957)
- Wah Re Zamaney (1958)
- Nagin (1959)- as a lead actor for the first time. A successful Golden Jubilee film at the box-office
- Clerk (1960)
- Aladdin Ka Beta (1960)
- Do Ustaad (1960)
- Sher-e-Islam (1961)
- Taj Aur Talwar (1961)
- Aasra (1969)
- Dastaan (1969)
