= Syed Kamal =

Pakistani film and TV actor, producer and director (1937 – 2009)

Syed Kamal سیّد کمال
- Born: 27 April 1937; Meerut, Uttar Pradesh, British India
- Died: 1 October 2009 (aged 72); Karachi, Sindh, Pakistan
- Occupations: Actor; Director; Producer; Screenwriter
- Years active: 1945 – 2002
- Awards: Special Award (Lifetime Achievement Award) from Nigar Awards in 2000

Syed Kamal (Urdu: سیّد کمال; (27 April 1937 – 1 October 2009), often just known as Kamal, was a Pakistani film and TV actor, producer, director and screenwriter.

Popular in the 1960s and 1970s, he worked in some 120 films.

In 1998 he released his autobiography, Dastan-e-Kamal.

== Early life and education ==
Syed Kamal was born in Meerut, Uttar Pradesh, British India on 27 April 1937. Following his secondary education at the Faiz-e-Aam School in Meerut, he earned a Bachelor's degree from Agra University.

He moved to Pakistan alongside his family in 1956 despite having an offer to act in Mehboob Khan's classic Mother India, which released in 1957. He had worked in four Hindi movies before migrating to Pakistan.

He was a relative of Indian actor Naseeruddin Shah.

== Career ==
=== Cinema ===
Syed Kamal was a popular filmstar in the 1960s and the 1970s. Kamal, whose film Tauba (1963) became a success at the box office, had a striking resemblance to the Indian filmstar Raj Kapoor, and he was not evasive about this issue. He once said, "People used to mistake me for Raj Kapoor while I was in Bombay and I enjoyed it". In fact, according to Pakistani script writer Ali Sufyan Afaqi, Kamal used to practice Raj Kapoor's scenes in front of a mirror. In Kamal's first appearance in a Pakistani movie Thandi Sarak (1957), by producer Shabab Kiranvi, he was meant to resemble Raj Kapoor.

He wrote, produced and directed over a dozen films, including Insaan Aur Gadha (1973).

In 1979, he directed and starred in the Urdu movie Yahan Se Wahan Tak. Written by Haseena Moin, it was his only film with Waheed Murad.

=== Television ===
After retirement from films, he began acting in Pakistan Television dramas at a fairly advanced age. His most notable TV appearance is in hit TV drama Kashkol (1993) in which he played a wealthy businessman whose son (played by his real life son, Ghalib Kamal) becomes addicted to heroin.

== Death and legacy ==
Syed Kamal died on 1 October 2009 at Karachi after a lingering illness at age 72. He had been a heart patient for many years and had fallen accidentally at his home about a month ago. He was bedridden since his fall. His survivors include his wife, his son Ghalib Kamal and three daughters.

Paying tributes to Syed Kamal, the president of Hum TV, Sultana Siddiqui said that Syed Kamal belonged to a respectable family and had encouraged many people to join the Pakistan film industry. Film script writer Pervaiz Kaleem, film director Aslam Dar, actress Babra Sharif and actor Ghulam Mohiuddin also paid their tributes to Syed Kamal.

== Achievements and awards ==
- Syed Kamal won a Special Nigar Award (Special Award) for film Behan Bhai (1968)
- Special Nigar Award (Lifetime Achievement Award) in 2000.
- Nigar Award for 'Best Actor' for the Punjabi-language film Jat Kurrian Taun Darda in 1976.

Among his other activities, he founded the Karachi Film Guild and Pakistan Film and TV Academy.

== Selected filmography ==
Year	Title	Actor	Director	Producer	Screenwriter	Language
1957	Thandi Sarak	Yes	No	No	No	Urdu
1959	Sawera	Yes	No	No	No	Urdu
1959	Apna Paraya	Yes	No	No	No	Urdu
1961	Zamana Kya Kahega	Yes	No	No	No	Urdu
1962	Banjaran	Yes	No	No	No	Urdu
1963	Tauba	Yes	No	No	No	Urdu
1964	Ashiana	Yes	No	No	No	Urdu
1965	Aisa Bhi Hota Hai	Yes	No	No	No	Urdu
1966	Joker (Kamal's semi-autobiographical film)	Yes	No	No	No	Urdu
1968	Behan Bhai	Yes	No	No	No	Urdu
1968	Shehnai	Yes	Yes	Yes	No	Urdu
1969	Nai Laila Naya Majnu	Yes	No	No	No	Urdu
1970	Road To Swat	Yes	No	No	No	Urdu
1970	Honeymoon	Yes	Yes	Yes	No	Urdu
1971	Roop Behroop	Yes	No	Yes	No	Urdu
1973	Farz	Yes	No	No	No	Urdu
1973	Insan Aur Gadha	Yes	Yes	Yes	Yes	Urdu
1976	Jat Kurian Tau Darda	Yes	Yes	Yes	Yes	Punjabi
1977	Aj Diyan Kurrian	Yes	Yes	Yes	Yes	Punjabi
1978	Kal De Munday	Yes	Yes	Yes	Yes	Punjabi
1984	Jat Kamala Gaya Dubai	Yes	Yes	Yes	Yes	Punjabi
1986	Siyasat	Yes	Yes	Yes	Yes	Urdu

== Bibliography ==
- داستان کمال (Dastan-e-Kamal; translated both as "The Legend of Kamal" or "The Legend of Perfection"), al Hasan, 1998. Autobiography.

== See also ==
- List of Lollywood actors
