= Husna =

Pakistani film actress

- حسنہ
- Born: Nudrat Jahan; 6 September 1942 (age 83)
- Occupation: Actress
- Years active: 1958 – 1980s

Husna (born Nudrat Jahan 6 September 1942) is a Pakistani actress who worked in Pakistani cinema from the late 1950s to the early 1980s. She made her debut in 1958 and mostly appeared in supporting roles in films. She is the recipient of the Nigar Award for Best Supporting Actress for the film Sabaq (1972).

== Career ==
Husna was born on 6 September 1942 as Nudrat Jahan in the household of Aftab Ali Khan, a friend of veteran film producer Shaukat Hussain Rizvi, who introduced her into the Pakistani film industry with the professional name 'Husna'. She made her debut as a child actor with his film Jan-e-Bahar (1958). Husna never became a top heroine and mainly played the side-heroine or vamp roles in Urdu and Punjabi films during her nearly three decades long career. Her big breakthrough came with Ajab Khan (1961), starring opposite Sudhir.

Her other appearances include Changez Khan (1958), Nagin (1959), Rani Khan (1960), Dosti (1971), and Sabaq (1972), among other musical films. Ahmad Bashir's Neela Parbat (1969) was one of her memorable films opposite Muhammad Ali, which was an experimental film inspired by Neo-realism. She played leading roles in Honeymoon (1970) and Khamosh Nigahen (1971) opposite Kamal and Waheed Murad, respectively.

== Personal life ==
She married film actor Darpan, actor Santosh Kumar's younger brother, but the marriage lasted only two years. She later married within her extended family and retired from films after acting in more than 150 films.

== Major films ==
- Jaan-e-Bahar (1958)
- Changez Khan (1958)
- Nagin (1959)
- Sathi (1959)
- Rani Khan (1960)
- Farishta (1961)
- Ajab Khan (1961)
- Shaheed (1962)
- Naila (1965)
- Behan Bhai (1968)
- Neela Parbat (1969)
- Honeymoon (1970)
- Dosti (1971)
- Khamosh Nigahen (1971)
- Sajan Milde Kadi Kadi (1972)
- Sabaq (1972)
- Jaal (1973)
- Surraya Bhopali (1976)

== Awards ==
- Husna received the Best Supporting Actress Nigar Award in 1972 for the film Sabaq.

== See also ==
- List of Lollywood actors
