= Aslam Pervaiz =

Pakistani film actor (1932–1984)

- اسلم پرویز
- Born: Chaudhary Muhammad Aslam Tarar; 12 February 1932; Lahore, Pakistan
- Died: 21 November 1984 (aged 52); Lahore, Pakistan
- Other name: 'The Prince'
- Citizenship: Pakistan
- Occupation: Film Actor
- Years active: 1952 – 1984
- Spouse: Surriya Aslam
- Children: 4 (Zulfiqar Aslam, Asiya Aslam, Asghar Aslam, Aqsa Aslam)
- Father: Chaudhary Din Muhammad
- Relatives: Muhammad Aslam Chowdhry, Moyene Najmi, Muhammad Akram Chowdhry
- Awards: Pride of Performance Award by the President of Pakistan in 2018; Special Award from Nigar Awards for 30 years of excellence in films in 1981; Nigar Awards in 1970 and 1984

Aslam Parvez (12 February 1932 – 21 November 1984) was a Pakistani film actor.

== Early and personal life ==
Aslam Parvez was born as Chaudhary Muhammad Aslam Tarar into a family of traders in Lahore, Punjab, British India on 12 February 1932.

His grandfather Deen Mohammad established an office building at Shahra-e-Quaid-e-Azam, his brother Afzal was the son-in-law of Chaudhary Eid Muhammad, a movie director and producer and also the grandfather of Vasay Chaudhry, while a brother was a chartered accountant and another was a painter.

He married his second cousin Surraiya before joining the Pakistani film industry. They have four children, two sons and two daughters: Zulfiqar Aslam, Asghar Aslam, Aasiya Aslam and Aqsa Aslam.

== Career ==
Aslam Parvez entered the Pakistani film industry in the year 1955 at the age of 23. He started his film career in producer Anwar Kamal Pasha's Qatil (1955) as a side hero. Thereafter, he played the leading role in the Punjabi language film Patay Khan opposite Noor Jehan. In the film Koel (1959), Aslam Pervaiz performed a leading role opposite film actresses Noor Jehan and Neelo. He played the villain in movies like Saheli (1960), Insaan aur Admi (1970), Tehzeeb (1971) and Baharo Phool Barsao (1972).

== Death ==
While returning from a film shooting on 14 November 1984, he was seriously injured in a car accident and died at a hospital a week later. Fellow actor Iqbal Hassan, who was driving the car died shortly after the accident.

== Awards ==
- 1970 Nigar Award Best Supporting Actor-film Insaan Aur Aadmi (1970)
- 1981 Nigar Award Special Award for 30 years of excellence in films
- 1984 Nigar Award Special Award for Miss Colombo (1984)
- 2018 Pride of Performance award by the President of Pakistan

== Selected filmography ==
Year	Title	Role	Note
1955	Qatil		
1955	Paatay Khan		
1956	Chann Mahi		
1958	Chhoo Mantar		
1959	Koel		
1959	Neend		
1960	Rahguzar		
1960	Saheli		
1960	Roopmati Baaz Bahadur		
1961	Surayya		
1963	Isq Per Zor Nahin		
1963	Shikwa		
1963	Daaman		
1965	Kaneez		
1965	Malangi		
1966	Payal Ki Jhankar		
1967	Aag		
1968	Dil Mera Dharkan Teri		
1968	Behan Bhai		
1971	Tehzeeb		
1973	Jeera Blade		
1973	Rangeela Aur Munawar Zarif		
1975	Sheeda Pastole		
1976	Badtameez		
1976	Society Girl		
1976	Mohabbat Aur Mehangai		
1980	Aap Ki Khatir		
1981	Amanat		
1982	Sangdil		
1983	Dehleez		
1984	Miss Colombo		
1984	Doorian		
1985	Khuddar		
1986	Joora		
