= Ejaz Durrani =

Pakistani actor (1935–2021)

Ejaz Durrani اعجاز درانی
- Born: Ejaz Durrani; 18 April 1935; Jalalpur Jattan, near Gujrat
- Died: 1 March 2021 (aged 85); Lahore, Punjab, Pakistan
- Occupations: Film actor, film producer
- Years active: 1956–1988
- Spouses: Noor Jehan (1959–1971); Firdous (1972–1993); Nadia Begum (1993–2021)
- Children: 3, including Nazia Ejaz Khan
- Awards: Nigar Award in 1969 for film Dilan De Sauday

Ejaz Durrani (18 April 1935 – 1 March 2021), known mononymously as Ejaz, was a Pakistani film actor, director and producer active from 1956 to 1988. He was married to legendary Pakistani actress-singer Noor Jehan. He is mostly remembered for his portrayal of Ranjha in the film Heer Ranjha (1970). He was especially known for portraying Punjabi culture folk heroes in epic love stories such as Heer Ranjha and Mirza Sahiban.

== Early and personal life ==
Ejaz was born in a village in Jalalpur Jattan, Gujrat District in Pakistan (then British India) in 1935. He was married to actress-singer Noor Jehan in 1959 and had three daughters with her: Hina, Shazia and Nazia. They eventually divorced. Noor Jehan got the custody of their daughters and raised them on her own. Ejaz later married film actress Firdous.

== Career ==
=== Actor ===
Ejaz started his career in 1956 and rose to fame in the 1960s and 1970s as one of the leading actors in Punjabi cinema, often portraying romantic and folk-hero roles. He was best known for his performance in Heer Ranjha (1970), a landmark film in which he played the role of Ranjha opposite Firdous Begum, his future wife, who played Heer. The film remains a classic in Pakistani cinema due to its lyrical dialogue and cultural resonance.

=== Producer ===
In addition to acting, Durrani was also a successful film producer, backing box office hits such as Dosti (1971). His career was marked by an association with folkloric and emotional storytelling, a genre that became highly popular in Pakistani cinema during his peak years.

== Death and legacy ==
He remained an iconic figure in the industry until his retirement, remembered for both his film contributions and his lasting cultural impact. He died in 2021 at the age of 85.

== Legal troubles ==
Ejaz was detained for smuggling cannabis at the London Heathrow Airport. He was arrested and subsequently spent a few years in prison for it.

== Filmography ==
=== As an actor ===
- Hameeda (1956) (debut film)
- Bara Admi (1957)
- Gumrah (1959)
- Raaz (1959)
- Sola Aanay (1959)
- Suchchay Moti (1959)
- Daku Ki Ladki (1960)
- Gulbadan (1960)
- Izzat (1960)
- Manzil (1960)
- Salma (1960)
- Watan (1960)
- Do Raste (1961)
- Farishta (1961)
- Shaheed (1962)
- Azra (1962)
- Ajnabi (1962)
- Dosheeza (1962)
- Barsaat Main (1962)
- Aurat Eik Kahani (1963)
- Dhoop Chaon (1963)
- Baji (1963; cameo appearance)
- Beti (1964)
- Chingari (1964)
- Deewana (1964)
- Gehra Daagh (1964)
- Badnaam (1966)
- Jalwah (1966)
- Sarhad (1966)
- Sawaal (1966)
- Dost Dushman (1967)
- Gunah Gaar (1967)
- Lakhon Mein Aik (1967)
- Mirza Jat (1967)
- Nadira (1967)
- Shab-ba-Khair (1967)
- Yatim (1967)
- Bauji (1968)
- Behan Bhai (1968)
- Beti Beta (1968)
- Dhoop Aur Saey (1968)
- Do Bhai (1968)
- Doosri Shadi (1968)
- Hamida (1968)
- Ismet (1968)
- Jawani Mastani (1968)
- Katari (1968)
- Main Kahan Manzil Kahan (1968)
- Main Zinda Hoon (1968)
- Mauj Behar (1968)
- Murad Baloch (1968)
- Pakeezah (1968)
- Shahansha-e-Jahangir (1968)
- Zalim (1968)
- Bhaiyan di Jodi (1969)
- Buzdil (1969)
- Dard (1969)
- Dilbar Jani (1969)
- Dildar (1969)
- Dillan Dey Souday (1969)
- Diya Aur Toofan (1969)
- Dulla Hyderi (1969)
- Ishq Na Puche Zat (1969)
- Jaggu (1969)
- Kunj Vichar Gaee Allaudin (1969)
- Lachchi (1969)
- Najo (1969)
- Nake Hindia Nira Pyar (1969)
- Pak Daman (1969)
- Pather te lik (1969)
- Qol-o-Qarar (1969)
- Sheran Di Jodi (1969)
- Tere Ishq Nachaya (1969)
- Zarqa (1969)
- Anwara (1970)
- Heer Ranjha (1970)
- Sajna Door Diya (1970)
- Shama Aur Parwana (1970)
- Aasoo Billa (1971)
- Dosti (1971)
- Khan Chacha (1972)
- Do Pattar Annaran De (1972)
- Ishtahari Mulzim (1972)
- Sultan (1972)
- Ziddi (1973)
- Banarsi Thug (1973)
- Kaliyar (1984) (his last film as an actor)

=== As a producer ===
Some of his hits as a producer are Heer Ranjha (1970), Dosti (1971), Sholay (1984) and Maula Bakhsh (1988)

=== Other activities ===
He was elected as the vice president of the Pakistan Film Producers Association in Pakistan.
