= Neelo =

Pakistani actress (1940–2021)

Neelo نیلو
- Born: Cynthia Alexander Fernandes; 30 June 1940; Bhera, Punjab, British India
- Died: 30 January 2021 (aged 80); Lahore, Punjab, Pakistan
- Other names: The Queen of Romance; The Princess of Romance; Abida Riaz
- Occupation: Film actress
- Years active: 1955 – 2005
- Spouse: Riaz Shahid (m. 1965; died 1972)
- Children: 3, including Shaan Shahid (son)
- Awards: Sitara-i-Imtiaz (2022)

Neelo Begum (born Cynthia Alexander Fernandes; née Abida Riaz; 30 June 1940 – 30 January 2021) was a Pakistani veteran film actress. She made her film debut in 1956 with a Hollywood film Bhowani Junction. She was known as The Queen of Romance and The Princess of Romance for her portrayal of romantic roles. She worked in more than 134 Pakistani films including Urdu and Punjabi language films.

She was the recipient of numerous awards, including Nigar Awards. She first gained recognition after appearing in the song "Aaye Mausam Rangilay Suhanay" from Saat Lakh and achieved critical and commercial success with the titular role in Zarqa.

== Early life ==
Born into a Catholic family, she converted to Islam and adopted a Muslim name, Abida Riaz, after marrying Pakistani filmmaker Riaz Shahid in 1965.

Neelo was born in Bhera, British India. She did her primary schooling at Kinnaird High School, Lahore.

== Controversies ==
In 1965, at the peak of her popularity, she was summoned by Nawab Malik Amir Mohammad Khan, then Governor of West Pakistan, to dance on stage for the Shah of Iran during his official visit to Pakistan; but she refused to do it for her own reasons. Harassed and threatened, Neelo faced dire consequences for refusing to obey official orders. She was allegedly gang molested and attempted suicide on the way to the Governor's House and was taken to a hospital instead, where the doctors saved her life.

News of the incident generated widespread public backlash against the Nawab. The renowned leftist poet Habib Jalib, on hearing of the incident, expressed his anguish in his poem over her attempted suicide: "Tu kay nawaqif-e-aadab-e-ghulami hae abhi...raqs zanjeer pehan ker bhi kya jata hae" (meaning: "unaware art thou yet of the rites of enslavement...dance can be performed even while enchained".) Later this poem was used in the film Zarqa (1969) with minor changes and ended up becoming a super-hit film song in Pakistan. The film song became much more relevant, effective, and popular because it was picturised on Neelo herself and was based on similar real-life events in Neelo's life. She also won the Best Actress Nigar Award for the film Zarqa. It had superb music by Wajahat Attre and was sung by Mehdi Hassan. Zarqa (1969) was produced and directed by Neelo's husband, Riaz Shahid, who also wrote its screenplay. Neelo helped her husband produce this film and it became the box office hit film of her career.

== Personal life ==
Born Cynthia Alexander Fernandes, Neelo was the only Pakistani actress to feature in a major Hollywood film, "Bhowani Junction," starring Ava Gardner and Stewart Granger, which also marked her film debut. She later entered the Pakistani film industry as an extra, worked her way up to second lead roles, and eventually became a leading lady due to her exceptional talent.

"Zarqa" became Pakistan's first diamond jubilee film and marked the pinnacle of Neelo's career, being hailed as a milestone in Pakistani cinema.

Neelo and Riaz Shahid named their first child Zarqa in honor of the film. They also had two sons, Sarosh and Armaghan, the latter of whom became well-known as actor and director Shaan Shahid. Riaz Shahid died from blood cancer in October 1972.

== Illness and death ==
Neelo died from blood cancer on 30 January 2021 in Lahore.

== Filmography ==
- 1956 Bhowani Junction
- 1956: Sabira
- 1957: Anjaam
- 1957: Bholey Khan
- 1957: Pasban
- 1957: Sehti
- 1957: Saat Lakh
- 1957: Yakke Wali
- 1957: Aankh Ka Nashah
- 1958: Akhri Nishan
- 1958: Changez Khan
- 1958: Darbar
- 1958: Jaan-e-Bahaar
- 1958: Jatti
- 1958: Kachian Kaliyan
- 1958: Mumtaz
- 1958: Nayi Larki
- 1958: Neya Daur
- 1958: Sheikh Chilli
- 1958: Zehr-e-Ishq
- 1959: Koel
- 1959: Lalkaar
- 1959: Lukkan Mitti
- 1959: Neend
- 1959: Shama
- 1959: Shera
- 1959: Sola Aanay
- 1959: Suchhey Moti
- 1959: Nagin
- 1959: Saathi
- 1959: Yaar Beli
- 1960: Alladin Ka Beta
- 1960: Ayaz
- 1960: Insaaf
- 1960: Khyber Mail
- 1960: Manzil
- 1960: Neelofar
- 1960: Shehzadi
- 1960: Street 77
- 1961: Bara Bajje
- 1961: Do Raste
- 1961: Subah Kahin Sham Kahin
- 1962: Azra
- 1962: Banjaran
- 1962: Barsaat mein
- 1962: Darwaza
- 1962: Dosheeza
- 1962: Ghunghat
- 1962: Husn-o-Ishq
- 1962: Unche Mahal
- 1963: Barat
- 1963: Daaman
- 1963: Ishq par zor nahin
- 1963: Kala Aadmi
- 1963: Mouj Mela
- 1963: Qatal ke baad
- 1963: Shikwa
- 1964: Beti
- 1964: Daachi
- 1964: Gehra Daagh
- 1964: Jugni
- 1964: Khyber Pass
- 1964: Mera Mahi
- 1964: Nehle peh Dehla
- 1964: Sher di Bachi
- 1965: Fareb
- 1965: Jeedar
- 1965: Raqqasa
- 1966: Abba Jee
- 1966: Ann Parh
- 1966: Badnaam
- 1966: Chughalkhor
- 1966: Laado
- 1966: Mr. Allah Ditta
- 1966: Naghma.e-Sehra
- 1966: Nizam Lohar
- 1966: Payal Ki Jhankar
- 1967: Chattan
- 1967: Dil Da Jani
- 1967: Neeli Baar
- 1967: Ravi Paar
- 1967: Sham Savera
- 1967: Yaar Maar
- 1968: Jag Beeti
- 1968: Lala Rukh
- 1968: Paristan
- 1968: Wohti
- 1969: Aukha Jatt
- 1969: Zarqa
- 1971: Karishma
- 1974: Khatarnak
- 1974: Bahisht (producer only)
- 1975: Athra
- 1975: Balwant Kaur
- 1975: Dhan Jigra Maa Da
- 1975: Heera Phumman
- 1975: Izzat
- 1975: Jailor te Qaidi
- 1975: Mera Naa Patey Khan
- 1975: Rajjo
- 1975: Sir Da Badla
- 1975: Sultana Daku
- 1975: Watan Iman
- 1976: Ayyash
- 1976: Gangu Puttar Maa Da
- 1976: Jatt Kurrian Taun Darda
- 1976: Khaufnaak
- 1976: Kil Kil Mera Naa
- 1976: Pindiwal
- 1976: Wardat
- 1977: Aj Diyan Kurrian
- 1977: Akhri Goli
- 1977: Danka
- 1977: Jurm main keeta si
- 1977: Malikzada
- 1977: Mere Badshah
- 1977: Sadqay Teri Mout Tun
- 1977: Tera vi jawab nahin
- 1978: Chamman Khan
- 1978: Gharib da baal
- 1978: Ghunda
- 1978: Haidar Daler
- 1978: Inqalab
- 1978: Mazi, haal aur mustaqbil
- 1978: Nazrana
- 1978: Sharif Shehri
- 1978: Tax
- 1979: General Bakht Khan
- 1979: Mout meri zindagi
- 1979: Order
- 1980: Chotay Nawab
- 1980: Heera Puttar
- 1982: Khatra 440
- 1989: Barood ki Chhaon
- 1990: Bulandi
- 1990: Jur'at
- 2013: Waar

== Tribute and honour ==
Actress and model Iqra Aziz held a tribute in her memory on International Women's Day and described her a very fine actress, successful individual, an amazing wife, and a wonderful mother. The Government of Pakistan named a street and intersection after her in Lahore on August 16, 2021.

== Awards and recognition ==
| Year | Award | Category | Result | Title | Ref. |
|---|---|---|---|---|---|
| 1959 | Nigar Award | Best Supporting Actress | Won | Koel | |
| 1963 | Nigar Award | Best Supporting Actress | Won | Aman | |
| 1969 | Nigar Award | Best Actress | Won | Zarqa | |
| 1999 | Nigar Award | Special Millennium Award | Won | Herself | |
| 2022 | Sitara-i-Imtiaz | Award by the President of Pakistan | Won | Herself | |
