= Rahguzar =

1960 film

- Directed by: Zia Sarhadi
- Written by: Zia Sarhadi
- Produced by: Chodhary Eid Mohammad
- Starring: Sabiha Khanum; Aslam Pervaiz; Nayyar Sultana; Allauddin; Nighat Sultana; Bibbo; Rakhshi
- Cinematography: Raza Mir; Suhail Hashmi
- Release date: 15 January 1960
- Country: Pakistan
- Language: Urdu

Rahguzar is a 1960 Pakistani film directed and written by Zia Sarhadi. It was Sarhadi's debut in Lollywood, after his migration to Pakistan. Sabiha Khanam, Nayyar Sultana and Aslam Pervaiz played the lead roles in the film. Muslehuddin was the music composer while Tanvir Naqvi was the lyricist. It was released on 15 January 1960.

== Cast ==
- Sabiha Khanam
- Aslam Pervaiz
- Nayyar Sultana
- Laila
- Nighat Sultana
- Allauddin
- Agha Talish
- Asad Jafri
- Diljeet Mirza
- Rakhshi
- Abbu Shah
- Saqi
- Bibbo

== Soundtrack ==
The music was composed by Muslehuddin, all lyrics were written by Tanvir Naqvi.

=== Track listing ===
- Dil hai be-sahara, aaja mere mahiya by Zubaida Khanum
- Dil mera aa geya, aa geya by Munir Hussain
- Tujhe pyar aaye kisi pe kab by Saleem Raza
- Lehar lehar lehraye, gaye milan ke geet by Saleem Raza and Naheed Niazi
- Tere jahan mein, hamain kya mila by Zubaida Khanum and Saleem Raza
- Sham ki bela hai, koi akela hai by Kausar Parveen
- O dil walay, muskara le, duniya kitni haseen hai by G. M. Durrani
