= Waadah (1957 film) =

1957 film

- Directed by: W. Z. Ahmed
- Written by: W. Z. Ahmed
- Produced by: Mian Ehsan-ul-Haq; W. Z. Ahmed
- Starring: Sabiha Khanam; Santosh Kumar
- Cinematography: Nabi Ahmed
- Music by: Rasheed Attre
- Production company: Crescent Films
- Release date: 2 May 1957
- Country: Pakistan
- Language: Urdu

Waadah (transl. Promise) is a 1957 Pakistani musical romance film directed by W.Z. Ahmed. It is the first film that Ahmed made in the country after he migrated to Pakistan and he made two films in Pakistan. Sabiha Khanam and Santosh Kumar played the lead roles in the film.

The film became a hit due to its music which was composed by Rashid Attre, especially the songs "Jab terey sehar sey guzarta hoon" and "Bar bar barseen morey nain" became widely popular at that time. Waadah was a commercially successful of 1957 and won two awards at Nigar Awards including Best actor for Kumar and best director.

The film was screened at Lok Virsa Museum in 2018. In an article published by BBC Urdu, Waadah was listed among the "10 best films of Pakistani cinema". It was also selected among the same list as published in Cinemaya.

== Plot ==
Bahadur works as a servant for Akbar Ali Khan. His several encounters with Fareeda make them start liking each other. They fall in love with each other, and they promise to stay together forever when she comes on a picnic on Akbar's invitation with her father, as her father is a friend of Akbar. At the picnic, Akbar's younger brother Asghar hits Bahadur in jealousy as he wants to marry Fareeda.

Bahadur is taken away by a poor old farmer and his daughter, Farhat. She takes care of him and, he regains consciousness after a month but goes blind. On his demand, Farhat takes him to Fareeda's house where her nikkah with Asghar is yet to happen but her sister is married to Akbar. Fareeda comes outside after listing Bahadur and they both elope to Farhat's house where they decide to marry and go far away but they get caught by Fareeda's father. He arrests Bahadur and locks him up in jail and also strictly treats Fareeda. She again elopes from her house and goes to Bahadur who is now out of jail. They decide to leave the city, go to another city and a man helps them a lot throughout the journey. He helps them in their living and Bahadur's treatment as well. Later, it is revealed to Fareeda that Asghar hired this man who creates differences between her and Bahadur and both of them part their ways.

Fareeda goes to her house where her father accepts her. Her sister dies after giving birth to a child and on his father's demand, she marries Akbar for the sake of her sister's child.

After many years, Akbar receives a letter from Bahadur where he mentions that he is coming from abroad and has now become a rich person. Unaware of Fareeda's marriage, Bahadur asks Akbar to meet his wife. He calls Fareeda to which there is no response, and they rush towards her room where she is lying dead. Bahadur is shocked to see Fareeda as his wife, who has embraced death because she couldn't fulfill her promise.

== Cast ==
- Sabiha Khanum as Fareeda
- Santosh Kumar as Bahadur
- Ilyas Kashmiri
- Laila
- Allauddin

== Music ==
The music of the film was composed by Rashid Attre and the lyrics were written by Tufail Hoshiarpuri and Saifuddin Saif. The songs of the film became very popular especially, "Jab terey shehar sey guzarta hoon" and "Bar bar barseen morey nain".

=== Track list ===
- Jab terey shehar sey guzarta hoon Sung by Sharafat Ali
- Bar bar barseen morey nain by Kausar Parveen and Sharafat Ali
- Aaj ki raat matt jao, kahin aaj ki raat by Kausra Parveen
- Ab jo milun gi, un say kahun gi, bolo jee by Kausra Parveen
- Jhoom jhoom kar gaye jawani, dil lay lo by Zubaida Khanum
- Lay chal, lay chal, lay chal, ab manjhdar mein by Sharafat Ali and Kausar Parveen
- Nain se nain milaye rakhne ko, mitwa mora chahat ko by Fateh Ali Khan, Zahida Parveen and others
- Nazar nazar say mila lein, agar ijazat ho by Kausar Parveen and Saleem Raza
- Qismat roothi, sathi chhota, reh geya gham by Kausra Parveen and Sharafat Ali
- Shaam saveray nain bichha kar rah takun main sajan ki by Kausar Parveen
- Sunayen kya dukh bhari kahani, sunayen kya dard ka afsana by Kausar Parveen

== Awards ==
At the 1957 Nigar Awards ceremony, the film received two awards in the following categories:

Category	Awardee
Best actor	Santosh Kumar
Best director	W. Z. Ahmed
