= Sharafat Ali (singer) =

Pakistani playback singer (1924-1991)

- شرافت علی
- Born: 16 August 1924; Rampur, British India
- Died: 17 April 1991 (aged 66); Karachi, Pakistan
- Education: Aligarh Muslim University
- Occupation: Playback singer
- Years active: 1954–1981

Sharafat Ali (16 August 1924 – 17 April 1991) was a Pakistani singer who is best known for vocalizing the song "Jab Teray Shehar Se Guzarta Hun" for the film Waada (1957).

== Life and career ==
Sharafat Ali was born on 16 August 1924 in Rampur, British India. During his education at Aligarh Muslim University, he started singing on All India Radio. In 1948, he moved to Pakistan and settled in Lahore.

Sharafat Ali was not a professional singer but his passion for music helped him earn an A-grade as a singer at All India Radio. In 1954, during a visit to India, he got an opportunity to record a ghazal for the 1954 Indian film Mirza Ghalib. In Lollywood, he sang for only one Urdu film Waada (1957), which was directed by W. Z. Ahmed. He vocalized four songs for the film under the direction of musician Rashid Attre. A song from the film "Jab Teray Shehar Se Guzarta Hon" got iconic fame across the country. Later, after a conflict with Rasheed Attray, he departed the film industry. He left Lahore for Karachi and started a business company there. From 1958 to 1981, he only sang for Radio Pakistan, Karachi.

Sharafat Ali died in Karachi on 17 April 1991.

== Discography ==
Song title	Lyricist	Music director	Film
Jab Teray Shehar Say Guzarta Hun, Teri Ruswaion Say Darta Hun	Saifuddin Saif	Rashid Attre	Waada (1957)
Bar Bar Barsen Moray Nain, Moray Naina (with Kausar Parveen)	Saifuddin Saif	Rashid Attre	Waada (1957)
Lay Chal, Lay Chal, Lay Chal, Ab Manjhdar Mein (with Kausar Parveen)	Tufail Hoshiarpuri	Rashid Attre	Waada (1957)
Qismat Roothi, Sathi Chhota, Reh Geya Gham (with Kausar Parveen)	Tufail Hoshiarpuri	Rashid Attre	Waada (1957)
