= Saghar Siddiqui =

Pakistani folk poet

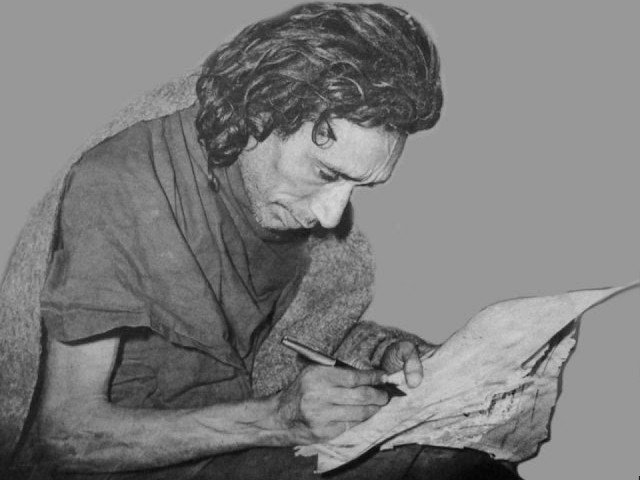
- Born: Muhammad Akhtar; 14 August 1928; Ambala, Punjab, British India
- Died: 19 July 1974 (aged 46); Lahore, Punjab, Pakistan
- Occupations: poet in both Urdu and Punjabi languages
- Writing career
- Pen name: Saghar
- Genres: Ghazal, Nazm, Free verse
- Notable awards: Sitara-i-Imtiaz (Star of Excellence) Award by the President of Pakistan in 2023

Saghar Siddiqui (born Muhammad Akhtar; 14 August 1928 – 19 July 1974) was a Pakistani Urdu poet. Known as the 'Poet of Pain', homeless Siddiqui was found dead on a street corner of Lahore at age 46. His dog also died a year later, reportedly at the same spot. He is regarded as a prominent nazm poet of Urdu.

== Biography ==
Saghar Siddiqui was born in 1928 in Ambala (British India) to a well-to-do middle-class family. There are few historic records of Saghar's personal life. He rarely spoke to any one in this regard and most of what is known of him tends to be from witness accounts.

Siddiqui was the only child of his parents and spent the early years of his life in Ambala and Saharanpur. He was home tutored and received his early education from Habib Hassan, a family friend. Young Muhammad Akhtar (later known as Saghar Siddiqui) was much impressed by Habib Hassan, and he got interested in Urdu poetry because of him. Siddiqui started writing poetry as a child. He moved to Amritsar, Punjab in search of work and used to make wooden combs while writing Urdu poetry. For some time, he used Nasir Hijazi as his pen name, but later he switched to Saghar Siddiqui. When 15 years old, he regularly started attending mushairas (poetry recitals) in Jalandhar, Ludhiana and Gurdaspur.

In 1947, when he was 19, he migrated to Pakistan during the independence and settled in Lahore. In those days with his slim appearance, wearing pants and boski (yellow silky cloth) shirts, with curly hair, and reciting beautiful ghazals in a melodious voice, he became a huge success. He had some tragic turns in his life.

Siddiqui continued to write poetry for the film industry and moved on to publish a literary magazine. The magazine was a critical success but a commercial flop. Disappointed, Saghar shut down the magazine. In his later life, he fell into depression, financially ruined and addicted to drugs.

Siddiqui chose to stay in cheap hotels, rather than settle into a house given by the government to refugees. He would pay the rent with meager amounts earned by selling his poems to magazines. Sometimes he would have to sell his poetry to other poets for a few rupees. He would use the waste paper spread around to light fires to stay warm during winter nights. Some of these poems were re-sold by these people as their own work.

Within a decade of coming to Pakistan, he became disillusioned as he saw corruption and nepotism being rewarded at the expense of genuine talent. In despair, he turned to morphine, buying it from janitors of hospitals in Lahore. As friends and strangers continued to exploit him, Siddiqui fell further into despair and was soon turned out of hotels and had to live on the streets . He was often seen along Circular Road of Lahore, and in Anarkali Bazar, Akhbaar Market, Aibak Road, Shah Alami, and around the Data Darbar area. He would often hold mushairas on the footpaths, in candle light. He continued to write poems, though most of them are lost and unpublished.

== Selected poetry ==
Song title	Sung by	Lyrics by	Music by	Film notes
Teri Ulfat Mein Sanam Dil Nai Buhat Dard Sahay, Aur Hum Chupp Hi Rahe	Zubaida Khanum	Saghar Siddiqui and Tufail Hoshiarpuri	Rashid Attre	Songwriter credits for this specific song are given to both poets by different sources
Laal Mori Pat Rakhio Bhala Jhoole Laalan De, Dama Dam Mast Qalandar	Noor Jehan and many others	Saghar Siddiqui	Ashiq Hussain and Nazir Ali	This dhamaal song is very popular in Pakistan and is often sung by various singers at the country's Sufi shrines especially at Lal Shahbaz Qalandar's shrine. Saghar wrote the song's lyrics for the film Jabroo (1956), produced by Inayat Hussain Bhatti, and original music by composer Ashiq Hussain. Later, music composer Nazir Ali re-composed it for Dillan Dey Sauday (1969), sung by Noor Jehan, and made it much more popular among the public.
Hei Dua Yaad Magar Harf-e-Dua Yaad Nahin		A ghazal by Saghar Siddiqui		
Dil Mila Aur Gham Shanaas Mila, Phool Ko Aag Ka Libaas Mila, Har Shanaawar Bhanwar Mein Dooba Tha, Jo Sitara Mila Udaas Mila.		Saghar Siddiqui		

== Death ==
In July 1974, Siddiqui was found dead on a street corner of Lahore at age 46. He was buried at the Miani Sahib graveyard. His dog also died a year later, reportedly at the same spot. His mausoleum at Miani Sahib graveyard in Lahore is marked with a commemorative shrine which was built later.

Julien Columeau, a French writer in Pakistan, wrote a semi-fictional Urdu novel Saghar based on Saghar Siddiqui's life.

== Awards and recognition ==
- Sitara-i-Imtiaz (Star of Excellence) Award by the President of Pakistan in 2023.
