= Shammi (Pakistani actress) =

Pakistani actress

- شمی
- Born: Shamshad Begum; 20 February 1939; Delhi, British India
- Died: 8 July 2001 (aged 62); Lahore, Pakistan
- Other names: Shammi Mumtaz; Shimmi
- Education: Dehli Girls School
- Occupation: Actress
- Years active: 1949 – 1983
- Spouse: Sudhir (m. 1953; died 1997)
- Children: 2
- Relatives: Salma Mumtaz (sister); Nida Mumtaz (niece)

Shamshad Begum, also known as Shammi (Urdu; شمی) (20 February 1939 – 8 July 2001) was a Pakistani actress. She acted in both Urdu and Punjabi films, including Shahida, Beqarar, Shammi, Ghulam, Barkha, Mehbooba, Ilzam, Roohi and Tarrap.

== Early life ==
Shamshad Begum was born in Delhi, British India in 1939. She was the younger sister of Salma Mumtaz. She received her primary education at a Dehli girls school and after the partition of India, migrated to Pakistan along with her family and settled in Lahore.

== Career ==
In 1949 she started working in films and made her debut as a child actress in the 1949 film Shahida and in 1950 did a supporting role in the film Beqarar. The same year she worked in film Shammi and was named Shammi after her character in the film it was a Punjabi film it was produced by famous singer Malika Pukhraj mother of singer Tahira Syed who owned a film studio in Lahore.

Later she appeared in a few more films including Ilzam, Mehbooba, Khizan Kai Baad. The following year in 1954 she played in Roohi along with Santosh Kumar the film, directed and produced by W. Z. Ahmed, became the first film banned by the Film Censor Board of Pakistan. The government said the film generated 'class hatred', and portrayed a rich married woman having an affair with a young, unmarried man; after the ban was lifted, the film received mixed reviews and was a moderate box office success.

In 1955 she played in Sohni and later in Khizan Kay Baad the following year. In 1956, she also played in Pawan. In 1960 she appeared in Sahil, which was directed by her husband Sudhir; the film, written by Arsh Lakhnavi, starred with Allauddin, Ilyas Kashmiri and Agha Talish. It was a moderate box office success.

In 1963 she worked in film Baghawat which was directed and produced by Sudhir; it was a Silver Jubilee hit at the box office. It starred Akmal Khan, Nayyar Sultana and Lehri.

In 1970, she worked in Bengali film Monimala later in 1976 she worked in Mout Khed Jawana Di a Punjabi film. In 1982, she worked in two films including Azeem Qaum Ki Azeem Beti and Raja Sahib.

In 1983, she retired and lived with her family in Lahore.

== Personal life ==
In 1953 she married actor Sudhir and they meet during the shooting of film Tarrap and together they had two sons Nadir Zaman Khan and Sikandar Zaman later Shammi's younger son Sikandar Zaman Khan married Fatima granddaughter of famous singer Noor Jehan. Shammi's elder sister Salma Mumtaz was a famous actress.

== Death ==
Shammi died on 8 July 2001, at her home in Lahore, Pakistan.

== Filmography ==
=== Film ===
Year	Film	Language
1949	Shahida	Urdu
1950	Beqarar	Urdu
1950	Shammi	Punjabi
1953	Ghulam	Urdu
1953	Barkha	Urdu
1953	Mehbooba	Urdu
1953	Ilzam	Urdu
1953	Tarrap	Urdu
1954	Roohi	Urdu
1955	Sohni	Urdu
1955	Khizan Kay Baad	Urdu
1956	Pawan	Urdu
1960	Sahil	Urdu
1963	Baghawat	Urdu
1970	Monimala	Bengali
1976	Mout Khed Jawana Di	Punjabi
1982	Azeem Qaum Ki Azeem Beti	Urdu
1982	Raja Sahib	Urdu
