= Jhoomer =

Film from Pakistan

- Directed by: Masood Parvez
- Written by: Imtiaz Ali Taj
- Screenplay by: Khawaja Khurshid Anwar
- Story by: Khawaja Khurshid Anwar
- Produced by: Khawaja Khurshid Anwar
- Starring: Musarrat Nazir; Sudhir; Allauddin; Agha Talish; Naeem Hashmi; Rakhshi
- Music by: Khwaja Khurshid Anwar
- Release date: 6 November 1959
- Country: Pakistan
- Language: Urdu

Jhoomer is a 1959 Pakistani film directed by Masood Parvez, produced by Khwaja Khurshid Anwar who wrote the screenplay also. The music composition was also done by Anwar and lyrics by Tanvir Naqvi. It stars Musarrat Nazir, Allauddin and Sudhir with Naeem Hashmi in a guest appearance.

== Plot ==
The story revolves around Rehana, a spoiled and wayward girl who is married off to Akhtar Mirza by her father, Seth Jamali. Akhtar is a decent and hardworking man, but Rehana doesn't care for him and treats him like a servant.

Akhtar takes Rehana to a hill station, where he owns a bungalow and meets Shadan, a kind-hearted and simple girl who lives with her brother, Sido.

Akhtar develops feelings for Shadan, and despite his best efforts to resist, he eventually falls in love with her. Meanwhile, Sido becomes suspicious of Akhtar's intentions and warns Shadan to stay away from him.

As the story unfolds, it is revealed that Rehana is not dead, but rather, she has been injured and is bedridden. In a dramatic twist, Sido mistakenly kills Rehana, thinking she is an intruder. Before dying, Rehana accuses Akhtar of her murder.

Akhtar is put on trial, and Shadan's loyalty is tested. In a surprising turn of events, Sido confesses to the crime, and Akhtar is acquitted. The film ends with Sido being sentenced to seven years in prison, while Akhtar and Shadan are free to start a new life together.

== Cast ==
- Musarrat Nazir as Shadan
- Sudhir as Akhtar Mirza
- Allauddin as Sido
- Laila
- Ghulam Mohammad
- Diljeet Mirza
- Azuri
- Rakhshi as Rehana
- Naeem Hashmi

== Production ==
When Noor Jehan refused to sing for Jhoomer because she wanted the lead role, which had already been given to Musarrat Nazir, Khwaja Khurshid Anwar chose Naheed Niazi to sing for instead.

== Soundtrack ==
The music of the film was composed by Khwaja Khurshid Anwar and lyrics were written by Tanvir Naqvi.

The film features following songs:

- Gham Hum Ko Diya, Ghamkhwaron Ne, Dil Tor Diya Dildaro Ne by Naheed Niazi
- Bhuji Bhuji Si Roshni Aur Hum by Irene Perveen
- Chali Ray, Chali Ray, Mein To Des Piya Ke Chali Ray by Naheed Niazi
- Ik Albela Pardesi Dil Mein Sama Gya Hai by Naheed Niazi
- Phoonk Do Bijliyo, Aa Ke Mera Jahan, Hai Yeh Aisa Chammam by Munir Hussain
- Dulhaniya, Roti Matt Jana, Apnay Aansoo, Apni Ahein by Naheed Niazi, Irene Perveen and chorus

== Awards ==
Year	Ceremony	Category	Recipient	Ref.
1959	Nigar Awards	Best Actress	Musarrat Nazir	
1959	Nigar Awards	Best Cameraman	Nabi Ahmed	
