= Koel (film) =

1959 Pakistani film

- Directed by: Masood Parvez
- Written by: Shams Lakhnavi
- Produced by: Saifuddin Saif
- Starring: Noor Jehan; Neelo; Aslam Pervaiz; Allauddin
- Edited by: Hasnain Rizvi
- Music by: Khwaja Khurshid Anwar
- Release date: 1959 (Pakistan)
- Country: Pakistan
- Language: Urdu

Koel is a Pakistani 1959 musical romantic drama film directed by Masood Parvez. The film stars Noor Jehan with Aslam Pervaiz, Neelo and Allauddin in supporting roles.

Koel is regarded as one of the best musicals of Lollywood with songs finely knitted in the plot.

It received 4 Nigar Awards including Best Supporting Actress for Neelo and Best Playback Singer for Noor Jehan.

== Cast ==
- Noor Jehan
- Aslam Pervaiz
- Neelo
- Allauddin
- Nazar

== Soundtrack ==
All lyrics are written by Tanvir Naqvi; all music is composed by Khwaja Khurshid Anwar.

No.	Title	Singer (s)	Length
1.	"Masti Mein Jhoom Jhoom Re"	Zubaida Khanum
2.	"Ho, Dil Jala Na Dil Waley"	Zubaida Khanum
3.	"Rim Jhim Rhim Jhim Parray Phuwaar, Tera Mera Nit Ka Pyaar"	Noor Jehan, Munir Hussain
4.	"Dil Ka Diya Jalaya Mein Ne"	Noor Jehan
5.	"Tere Bina Sooni Sooni Lagi Re"	Noor Jehan
6.	"Sagar Roye Lehren Shor Machayen"	Noor Jehan
7.	"Mehki Fazayen "	Noor Jehan

== Awards and nominations ==
Year	Award	Category	Awardee	Result	Ref.
—N/a	Nigar Awards	Best Playback Singer	Noor Jehan	Won	
—N/a	Nigar Awards	Best Supporting Actress	Neelo	Won	
—N/a	Nigar Awards	Best Lyricist	Tanvir Naqvi	Won	
—N/a	Nigar Awards	Best Sound Editor	C. Mandody	Won	
