= Rakhshi =

Pakistani actress (born 1945)

- رکھشی
- Born: Parveen Begum; 1945 (age 80–81); Lahore, British India
- Other names: The First Vamp of Lollywood; The First Dancer of Lollywood
- Education: St. Denny's (St. Tennies)
- Occupations: Actress; Dancer; Model; Fashion designer
- Years active: 1947–1967
- Children: 3

Rakhshi (born Parveen Begum) is a Pakistani former film actress, dancer, and fashion designer. She is recognized as the first "Western-style" dancer of Lollywood, establishing the archetype of the "vamp" in Pakistani cinema. Known for her modern fashion sense and bold screen presence, she predated other famous dancers of the era such as Neelo and Amy Minwalla.

== Early life and education ==
Rakhshi was born in Lahore as Parveen into a Christian family. Her father passed away three months prior to her birth. She was raised with a modern upbringing and received her Senior Cambridge education at St. Denny's (St. Tennies) School in Dehradun, British India. Her schooling and background contributed to a distinct Westernized accent and a sophisticated persona that would later define her cinematic career.

== Career ==
=== Early entrant and breakthrough ===
Rakhshi was an early entrant into the film industry, appearing in the 1947 film Director, produced in United India just before the partition. Her formal career in Pakistan began by chance. While visiting the set of Anwar Kamal Pasha's Dulla Bhatti (1956) with friends, she discovered the scheduled dancer, Nadra, had failed to appear. Encouraged by her peers, Rakhshi—known for her bold and "naughty" temperament—offered herself as a substitute. Despite Pasha's initial hesitation, as he viewed her more as a college student than a trained performer, she was cast. Following the film's success, she became a permanent fixture in the industry.

=== Typecasting and notable roles ===
Rakhshi was frequently typecast as a dancer or a "vamp" (the modern, often antagonistic female foil to the traditional heroine). This was partly due to her Westernized pronunciation and her personal preference for dance over dialogue-heavy acting.

One of her most significant roles came in the 1959 film Jhoomer, directed by Masood Parvez. She portrayed a Westernized girl raised by a nanny who rebels against her father and husband (played by Sudhir). Her performance, characterized by bold costumes and a tragic nightclub dance sequence to the song "Waqt Hei Buhut Hi Kum," remains a landmark in early Lollywood for its portrayal of social rebellion.

She also appeared in the critically acclaimed Jago Hua Savera (1959) and Neend (1959). Her commitment to the former was such that she traveled to London to assist the British editor in the film's post-production phase.

In 1971, she designed Rani's dresses in film Tehzeeb and she had her boutique called Fantasia.

== Personal life ==
After retiring from the film industry in the late 1960s, Rakhshi married a wealthy gentleman and stepped away from the limelight. She focused on raising her daughters, who attended her alma mater, St. Denny's College in Murree. In her later years, she expressed a desire for her daughters to follow in her footsteps as professional dancers.

== Filmography ==
=== Film ===
Year	Title	Role
1947	Director	Hindi
1955	Jallan	Urdu
1955	Ilteja	Urdu
1955	Patay Khan	Punjabi
1956	Dulla Bhatti	Punjabi
1956	Peengan	Punjabi
1956	Intezar	Urdu
1956	Sarfarosh	Urdu
1956	Pavan	Urdu
1956	Baghi	Urdu
1957	Seestan	Urdu
1957	Anjaam	Urdu
1957	Nooran	Punjabi
1957	Zulfan	Punjabi
1958	Changez Khan	Urdu
1958	Neya Zamana	Urdu
1958	Lakhpati	Urdu
1958	Pardesi	Sindhi
1958	Sitaron Ki Dunya	Urdu
1958	Sassi Punnu	Sindhi
1958	Bharosa	Urdu
1958	Aakhri Dao	Urdu
1959	Naji	Punjabi
1959	Jhoomer	Urdu
1959	Teray Baghair	Urdu
1959	Neend	Urdu
1959	Aaj Kal	Urdu
1959	Jago Hua Savera	Urdu / Bengali
1959	Lalkar	Urdu
1960	Rahguzar	Urdu
1960	Hamsafar	Urdu
1960	Shehzadi	Urdu
1960	Salma	Urdu
1960	Shehbaz	Urdu
1960	Sahil	Urdu
1960	Shaam Dhalay	Urdu
1960	Saheli	Urdu
1961	Chhotay Sarkar	Urdu
1961	Bombay Vala	Urdu
1961	Gul Bakavli	Urdu
1961	BeKhabar	Urdu
1961	Gulfam	Urdu
1961	Lakhon Fasanay	Urdu
1962	Paharan	Punjabi
1962	Suraj Mukhi	Urdu
1967	Bahadur	Urdu

== Legacy ==
Rakhshi is often compared to Bollywood's Sheila Ramani for her sophisticated and bold image. She paved the way for the "item song" culture in Pakistan, maintaining a professional and friendly rivalry with contemporary dancers like Amy Minwala.

=== Artistry and Style ===
Rakhshi was often compared to Bollywood actress Sheila Ramani for her sophisticated, modern aesthetic. She was a skilled dress designer, often designing her own "thin" and stylish dresses, which were considered provocative and ahead of their time by 1950s societal standards. She maintained a professional relationship with her contemporary, Amy Minwala, though they remained the only two dancers of that era to carve out a permanent niche for themselves.

=== Cultural Impact ===
Rakhshi's roles as a "vamp" allowed her to break social taboos by portraying assertive, stylish, and Westernized characters. This archetype paved the way for future Lollywood stars like Niggo and Amy Minwala.
