= Sarfarosh (1956 film) =

1956 film

- Directed by: Anwar Kamal Pasha
- Produced by: Anwar Kamal Pasha
- Starring: Santosh Kumar; Sabiha Khanum; Meena Shorey; Allauddin; Rakhshi
- Music by: Rashid Attre
- Release date: 30 May 1956
- Country: Pakistan
- Language: Urdu

Sarfarosh is a 1956 Urdu-language Pakistani film directed by Anwar Kamal Pasha. It was a success at the box office in Pakistan. The younger brother of lead actor Santosh Kumar, future director S. Suleman, worked on this film under director Anwar Kamal Pasha's guidance. Suleman was only 18 year old, but was made assistant director and received some of his initial training as a director on set.

== Cast ==
- Santosh Kumar as Suhail
- Sabiha Khanum as Bano
- Meena Shorey as Zarina
- Allauddin as Prime Minister
- Rakhshi
- Ghulam Mohammed as Kotwal
- Asif Jah

== Music ==
Film music was scored by Rashid Attre and the film song's lyrics were written by Saghar Siddiqui and Tufail Hoshiarpuri. In this film, playback singer Zubaida Khanum had 3 popular songs that helped her advance her singing career.

Song title	Sung by	Lyrics by	Music by	Film notes
Teri Ulfat Mein Sanam Dil Nai Buhat Dard Sahay, Aur Hum Chupp Hi Rahe	Zubaida Khanum	Saghar Siddiqui and Tufail Hoshiarpuri	Rashid Attre	Song writer credits for this specific song are given to both poets by different sources
Ik Chor Ik Lutera	Munawar Sultana	Tufail Hoshiarpuri	Rashid Attre	
Ae Chaand Unn Se Jaa Kar Mera Salam Kehna	Zubaida Khanum	Tufail Hoshiarpuri	Rashid Attre	
Mera Nishana Daikhay Zamana, Teer Pe Teer Chalaaun	Zubaida Khanum	Tufail Hoshiarpuri	Rashid Attre	
