= Chingari (1964 film) =

Pakistani film

- Poster
- Original title: چنگاری
- Directed by: Khawaja Khurshid Anwar
- Written by: Khawaja Khurshid Anwar
- Produced by: Khawaja Khurshid Anwar; Mian Zahoor Ahmad; Syed Bashir Ahmad
- Starring: Shamim Ara; Santosh Kumar; Nighat Sultana; Agha Talish; Khursheed Shahid; Deeba; Ejaz Durrani
- Music by: Khawaja Khurshid Anwar
- Release date: 23 October 1964
- Country: Pakistan
- Language: Urdu

Chingari (Urdu: چنگاری, lit. 'Spark') is a Pakistani black and white film directed by Khwaja Khurshid Anwar. It stars Shamim Ara and Santosh Kumar. Primarily known for its music, the film features song by Noor Jehan, Saleem Raza and Mehdi Hassan and lyrics by Qateel Shifai and Tanvir Naqvi. Released on 23 October 1964, the film performed average at the box office. It revolves around the clash between eastern and western civilizations. Chingari is one of the signature films of Anwar for which he wrote the story and composed the music also.

== Cast ==
- Shamim Ara
- Santosh Kumar
- Ejaz Durrani
- Deeba
- Komal
- Nighat Sultana
- Agha Talish
- Khursheed Shahid
- Nusrat Ara
- Nusrat Kardar

== Soundtrack ==
No.	Title	Lyrics	Performer(s)	Length
1.	"Aa ja pas meray, gham ki lambi raat hai"	Qateel Shifai	Saleem Raza
2.	"Ik dil ne kahi, ik dil ne suni"	Qateel Shifai	Noor Jehan, Saleem Raza
3.	"Zindagi tujh ko pukaray"	Qateel Shifai	Saleem Raza
4.	"Dil ki baat batain kis ko"	Tanvir Naqvi	Noor Jehan
5.	"Main to kar kar binti haar gayi"	Qateel Shifai	Noor Jehan
6.	"Aa ja pas meray, gham ki lambi raat hai"	Qateel Shifai	Noor Jehan
7.	"Kali kali mundlaye, bhanwra, kahin bhi Chain Na Paye"	Qateel Shifai	Noor Jehan

== Release and reception ==
Chingari was released countrywide on 23 October 1964. It performed average at the box office.
