= Ghunghat (1962 film) =

1962 Pakistani film

- Directed by: Khwaja Khurshid Anwar
- Written by: Khwaja Khurshid Anwar
- Produced by: Sultan Jilan; Khurshid Anwar
- Starring: Santosh Kumar; Nayyar Sultana; Agha Talish; Bibbo; Neelo
- Cinematography: Nabi Ahmed
- Edited by: Ali
- Music by: Khawaja Khurshid Anwar
- Release date: 3 November 1962
- Country: Pakistan
- Language: Urdu

Ghunghat (Urdu: گھونگھٹ, "Face-veil") is a 1962 Pakistani musical suspense thriller film directed by Khawaja Khurshid Anwar, who also wrote the screenplay and composed the music of the film.

The main concept was derived from Ghulam Mohammad's short story Dosheeza. The film features Nayyar Sultana and Santosh Kumar as leads with Neelo, Laila, Ghulam Mohammad and Bibbo in supporting roles.

The film was selected as the Pakistani entry for the Best Foreign Language Film at the 36th Academy Awards, but was not accepted as a nominee. This film won four awards at the 1962 Nigar Awards, including Best Actor for Kumar and Best Music.

The film was featured in British Film Institute's critics and users' polls of "Top ten Pakistani films of all times". In November 2015, it was screened at the Lok Virsa Museum to keep the historical records of the feature films.

== Plot ==
Shahid is deceived by his newly married bride Naheed, who elopes on their wedding night which disturbs him badly. He turns alcoholic and is left all alone after this tragic incident. To move on, he decides to visit a hill station with his friend so that he could feel better. However, on reaching there, he is haunted by the spirit of Usha Rani, which he always thought was his fantasy or his dream as he remembered in the fairytale from his childhood.

== Cast ==
- Santosh Kumar as Shahid
- Nayyar Sultana as Naheed / Usha Rani
- Laila
- Neelo
- A. Shah Shikarpuri
- Agha Talish
- Ghulam Mohammad

== Soundtrack ==
All lyrics are written by Tanvir Naqvi; all music is composed by Khwaja Khurshid Anwar

Ghunghat
No.	Title	Lyrics	Singer (s)	Length
1.	"Chahay Boloon, Chahay Na Boloon"		Naheed Niazi
2.	"Chhun Chhun Chhun, Meri Payal Ki Dhun"	Tanvir Naqvi	Naseem Begum
3.	"Mujh Ko Awaz Day Tu Kahan Hay"	Tanvir Naqvi	Mehdi Hassan
4.	"Meri Guriya Ka Hai Jalwa Nirala"		Ahmad Rushdi
5.	"Raahon Pe Thaari Main Nazrain Jamaye, Koi Aaye"	Tanvir Naqvi	Noor Jehan
6.	"Meray Piya Ko Dhoondh Ke Laao, Sakhi"	Faiz Ahmed Faiz	Noor Jehan
7.	"Kabhi Hum Bhi Tum Se Thay Aashna, Tumhein Yaad Ho Kay Na Yaad Ho"	Momin Khan Momin

"Rahoon Pey Thari Main, Nazrein Jamaye" is cited as an example of Anwar's "haunting" musical style, distinct from horror music.

== Awards ==
Ghunghat won a total of 4 following Nigar Awards:

- Best Actor - Santosh Kumar
- Best Music - Khwaja Khurshid Anwar
- Best Cameraman - Nabi Ahmed
- Best Editing - Ali

== See also ==
- List of submissions to the 36th Academy Awards for Best Foreign Language Film
- List of Pakistani submissions for the Academy Award for Best Foreign Language Film
