= Kausar Parveen =

Pakistani film playback singer

Kausar Parveen کوثر پروین

Background information
- Also known as: Kousar Perveen
- Born: Kausar Parveen Begum; 1933; Patiala, Punjab, British India
- Died: 30 December 1967 (aged 33–34) Lahore, Pakistan
- Occupation: Playback singer
- Years active: 1948 – 1967
- Spouse: Akhter Hussain Ankhiyan (husband) (Pakistani film music director)
- Children: 1
- Parent: Inayat Ali Nath (father)
- Relatives: Asha Posley (sister); Rani Kiran (sister); Najma Begum (sister)

Kauser Parveen (1933 - 30 December 1967) was a Pakistani playback singer during the 1950s and 1960s. She is known for vocalizing popular songs like, "O Maina Na Jane Kya Hogaya Kahan Dil Khogaya", "Pal Pal Jhoomun Jhoom Ke Gaun", and the film lullaby, "Raaj Dularey, Meri Ankhiyon Ke Taray".

She was the younger sister of actress Asha Posley.

== Early life and family ==
Kausar Parveen was born in Patiala, Punjab, British India, in 1933. She migrated to Pakistan, after the partition of India, along with her family. She was the daughter of Inayat Ali Nath, who was the music director of the first Pakistani film, Teri Yaad (1948). She was the youngest sister of actresses Asha Posley, Najma Begum and Rani Kiran.

== Career ==
Kausar began her singing career in the early 1950s and was introduced by the film producer Agha G. A. Gul and rose to fame when she sang for Master Inayat Hussain and G.A. Chisthi in the films, Gumnaam (1954) and Sassi (1954).

1955 was a pivotal year in her career as a singer. Under the direction of Master Inayat Hussain, she sang for two films, Inteqam and Qatil. While Qatil is best known for the Iqbal Bano's sad melody, "Ulfat Ki Nai Manzil Ko Chala", Kauser held her own with a love solo, "O Maena, Na Janey Kia Ho Gaya", which was filmed on Sabiha Khanum. Another highlight of 1955 was a lullaby from the film Naukar, "Raj Dularey Tohe Dil Mein Basaoun," which is still remembered today and became one of the most popular songs of her career and it went on to become one of her most notable songs.

In the late 1950s, Kauser's popularity began to fade with the advent of Zubaida Khanum. However, her versatility as a playback vocalist was demonstrated in two superhit films released in 1957; Waada and Saat Lakh. She performed the tragic song "Sitamgar Mujhe Bewafa Janta Hai" for Saat Lakh. She sang in a classical duet with Sharafat Ali for the film Waada (1957): "Baar Baar Barsey Morey Nain, Mohe Kaisey Mile Chain". Rashid Attre composed the soundtrack for both of these hits.

Kausar Parveen sang 273 songs in 90 films. Some people say that she had a honey-dripping voice.

== Personal life ==
Kausar was married to the music director Akhter Hussain Ankhiyan and she had one son.

== Death ==
Kausar Parveen died young on 30 December 1967, at the age of 34 at Lahore, Pakistan.

== Popular songs ==
Some of her hit songs are:

1. Ae Chand Unsay Kehna, Sung by Kausar Parveen, lyrics by Qateel Shifai, film Gumnaam (1954)
2. O Maina, Na Jane Kya Hogaya Kahan Dil Khogaya, Sung by Kausar Parveen, lyrics by Qateel Shifai, film Qatil (1955)
3. Raaj Dularey Tohe Dil Main Bithaun Tujhe Geet Suaon, Sung by Kausar Parveen, lyrics by Qateel Shifai, music by G.A. Chishti, film Noukar (1955)
4. Kab Tak Raho Ge Akhir Aji, Yun Door Door Ham Se, Sung by Kausar Parveen, lyrics by Qateel Shifai, music by Tassaduq Hussain, film Chhoti Begum (1956)
5. Mat Jao Aaj Ki Raat Piya, Sung by Kausar Parveen, lyrics by Qateel Shifai, music by Tassaduq Hussain, film Chhoti Begum (1956)
6. Har Qadam Pe Sitam, Har Ghari Gham Pe Gham, Sung by Kausar Parveen, lyrics by Qateel Shifai, music by Safdar Hussain, film Hameeda (1956)
7. Baar Baar Barse Morey Nain Morey Naina, Sung by Kausar Parveen and Sharafat Ali, lyrics by Saifuddin Saif, music by Rashid Attre, Waada (1957)
8. Sitamgar Mujhe Bewafa Janta Hai, Mere Dil Ki Halat Khuda Janta Hai, Sung by Kausar Parveen, lyrics by Saifuddin Saif, music by Rashid Attre, film Saat Lakh (1957)
9. Pal Pal Jhoomun Jhoom Ke Gaun, Sung by Kausar Parveen, lyrics by Qateel Shifai, music by Khawaja Khurshid Anwar, film Zehr-e-Ishq (1958)
