= Gulfam (film) =

1961 film

- گلفام
- Directed by: S. Suleman
- Produced by: Santosh Kumar
- Starring: Darpan; Musarrat Nazir; Nazar; S. Suleman; Talish; Rakhshi
- Edited by: M. Akram
- Music by: Rashid Attre
- Production company: Darpan Films
- Release date: 29 December 1961
- Country: Pakistan
- Language: Urdu

Gulfam is a 1961 Pakistani costume film directed by S. Suleman in his directorial debut.

It was produced by Darpan under his production banner Darpan Productions, who also played the lead role alongside Musarrat Nazir. The supporting actors include Nazar, S. Suleman and Talish. The music was composed by Rashid Attre with lyrics by Habib Jalib and Tanvir Naqvi.

The film received a Nigar Award for 'Best Editing' in 1961.

== Plot ==
The story of Gulfam is based on the backdrop of the conflict between the Muslims and the Roman nation. The plot primarily revolves around the romance of a brave young man with his bedouin beloved one.

== Cast ==
- Darpan
- Musarrat Nazir
- Nazar
- S. Suleman
- Himalyawala
- Talish
- Nasrin
- Rakhshi
- Zareen Panna

== Music ==
All music is composed by Rashid Attre

Gulfam
No.	Title	Lyrics	Singer (s)	Length
1.	"Aankh Mein Aankh Dal Ke"	Tanvir Naqvi	Naseem Begum
2.	"Bajay, Jhan Jhan Jhan Payal"	Tanvir Naqvi	Naseem Begum
3.	"Yeh Naz, Yeh Andaz, Yeh Jadoo, Yeh Adaein"	Tanvir Naqvi	Saleem Raza
4.	"Huzoor, Dekhiye, Zaroor Dekhiye"	Tanvir Naqvi	Naseem Begum
5.	"Mushkil Hai Meri Nazar Ke Teer Se Bachna"	Habib Jalib	Najma Niazi, Naheed Niazi and chorus

== Release and box office ==
Gulfam was released on 29 December 1961. The film celebrated golden jubilee at the box office with a theatrical run of more than 50 weeks.

== Awards ==
The film received a Nigar Award for 'Best Editing' for M. Akram.

== Impact ==
The commercial success of the film established the career of director S. Suleman due to which he went on to become one of the top directors of Pakistani cinema in the following years. The film became a trendsetter in the production of Costume films in the 1960s which continued till the mid-1970s.
