= Khwaja Khurshid Anwar =

Pakistani music director (1912 – 1984)

NI, SI Khwaja Khurshid Anwar خواجہ خورشید انور

Background information
- Also known as: Khwaja Sahib
- Born: Khurshid Anwar; 21 March 1912; Mianwali, Punjab, British India (Now in Pakistan)
- Died: 30 October 1984 (aged 72) Lahore, Punjab, Pakistan
- Genres: Classical; Indian film music, Pakistani film music
- Occupations: Music Director, Screenwriter, Film Director, Film Producer
- Years active: 1941 – 1982
- Label: Select Pictures (name of his film production company)

Khwaja Khurshid Anwar (21 March 1912 − 30 October 1984) was a Pakistani filmmaker, writer, director and music composer who earned recognition in both India and Pakistan. He is credited as being one of the most original and inventive music directors of his generation.

He was the Programme Producer (Music) at All India Radio or Akashvani (radio broadcaster), Delhi in 1939, where Indian music director Roshan was also a co-worker and later assisted him in composing film music in the 1940s.

A comprehensive website on his life and works is maintained by his son Khwaja Irfan Anwar. Also a book has been published on him.

== Early life ==
Khwaja Khurshid Anwar was born on 21 March 1912 in Mianwali, Punjab (now in Pakistan) where his maternal grandfather Khan Bahadur Sheikh Atta Mohammad (whose eldest daughter was married to philosopher-poet Muhammad Iqbal, to whom he was thus a nephew) was serving as civil surgeon.

His father Khwaja Ferozuddin Ahmad was a well-known barrister settled in Lahore, Pakistan. The ace jurist had a love for music so much so that he had a huge collection of gramophone records of Indian classical and neo-classical music and his precocious son had an unhindered access to them all. Moreover, in the weekly music performances held at the lawyer's home, renowned music masters used to perform, and it was here that the young Khurshid Anwar developed a taste for classical music. Considering Khurshid Anwar's keen interest, Khansahib Tawakkal Hussain agreed to take him as his disciple and train him in 1934.

Khurshid Anwar was also a brilliant student at Government College, Lahore, the renowned seat of learning at that time. Having topped in the master's degree in Philosophy in (1935), he appeared in the examination for Indian Civil Service (ICS) in 1936 but due to his political and anti-British Raj activities, the British colonial masters did not like his activities. He was also absent from the prize-distribution ceremony of the Punjab University held to honour the students with distinctions. When his name was called to receive the Nanak Gold Medal in Philosophy, nobody turned up. The British Chancellor of the University who was awarding medals remarked that the student having forgotten to receive the medal, is a true philosopher.

== Career in India ==
In 1939, Khurshid Anwar joined AIR All India Radio or (Akashvani (radio broadcaster)), Delhi as Programme Producer (Music). It was from here, after a chance meeting, that he acceded to the requests of Abdur Rashid Kardar, the film producer, to join Bombay film world as a music director. He made his debut as a music director in Kardar's Punjabi venture "Kurmai" (1941). His first Hindi film was "Ishara"(1943). The film gained much popularity from its songs which included "Panghat pe muraliya baje" by Suraiya, "Shabnam kyon neer bahaye" Sung by Gauhar Sultan, and "Dil deke dagha nahin dena" by Vatsala Kumathekar. Some of his other Hindi films were Parakh (1944, with Saraswati Devi), Yateem (1945), Aaj Aur Kal (1947), Pagdandi (1947), and Parwaana (1947) which was the last movie K. L. Saigal acted and sang in.

For "Singaar" (1949), he got the Clare Award for Best Music Director. His later films "Nishaana" (1950) and "Neelam Pari" (1952) added new feathers to his cap. He remained an inspiration to many later day music directors in both India and Pakistan. For many years, renowned Indian film music director Roshan was a disciple of his in India, as was Shankar of Shankar Jaikishan fame. He was regularly praised by his contemporary, Indian film music director Naushad Ali, who considered him to be one of the finest film composers in the subcontinent.

== Filmography ==
=== Writer ===
- Hamraz: Story, Screenplay and Dialogues (1967)
- Chingari: Story and Screenplay (1964)
- Ghunghat: Story and Screenplay (1962)
- Jhoomer: Story and Screenplay (1959)
- Zehr-e-Ishq: Story and Screenplay (1958)
- Intezar: Story and Screenplay (1956)

=== Director ===
- Ghunghat (1962)
- Chingari (1964)
- Hamraz (1967)

=== Producer ===
- Hamraz (co-Producer) (1967)
- Chingari (co-Producer) (1964)
- Ghunghat (co-Producer) (1962)
- Jhoomer (Producer) (1959)
- Zehr-e-Ishq (co-Producer) (1958)
- Intezar (co-Producer) (1956)

=== Music director in India ===
1. Kurmai (Punjabi) (1941)
2. Ishara (1943 film)
3. Parakh (1944 film) (1944)
4. Yateem (1945)
5. Parwana (1947 film) (1947)
6. Paghdandi (1947)
7. Aaj Aur Kal (1947)
8. Singhar (1949)
9. Nishana (1950)
10. Neelam Pari (1951)

=== Music director in Pakistani films ===
1. Intezaar
2. Mirza Sahiban (1956)
3. Zehr-e-Ishq(1958)
4. Jhoomer (1959)
5. Koel (1959)
6. Ayaz (1960)
7. Ghunghat (1962)
8. Chingari
9. Haveli (1964)
10. Sarhad (1966)
11. Hamraz (1967)
12. Guddo (Punjabi) (1970)
13. Heer Ranjha (Punjabi) (1970)
14. Parai Aag (1971)
15. Salam-e-Mohabbat (1971)
16. Shirin Farhad (1975)
17. Haider Ali (1978)
18. Mirza Jat (Punjabi) (1982)

== Some of his popular songs ==
Song title	Singer	Lyricist	Film notes
Paapi papeeha ray pee pee na bol bairi	Suraiya	D. N. Madhok	Parwana (1947 film)
Jab tum hee nahin apne, dunya hee begaani hai	Suraiya	D. N. Madhok	Parwana (1947 film)
Jis din say piya dil lay gaey, dukh dey gaey, chaen nahin aaey	Noor Jehan	Qateel Shifai	Intezaar (1956 film)
Chhoonay chhoonay naachun gi goonay goonay gaaun gi, piya jab aaen gay unn ko rijhaun gi	Noor Jehan	Qateel Shifai	Intezaar (1956 film)
O' jaanay waale re thehro zara ruuk jaao laut aao	Noor Jehan	Tufail Hoshiarpuri	Intezaar (1956 film)
Mohe Piya Milan Ko Jaanay De Bairania	Nahid Niazi	Qateel Shifai	Zehr-e-Ishq (1958 film)
Suno Arz Meri Kamli Waalay	Zubaida Khanum	Qateel Shifai	A popular Na'at song from Zehr-e-Ishq (1958 film)
Chali Re Chali Re, Barri Aas Laga Ke Chali Re, Mein Tau Des Piya Ke Chali Re	Nahid Niazi	Tanvir Naqvi	Jhoomer (1959 film)
Rhim Jhim Rhim Jhim Parray Phuwaar, Tera Mera Nit Ka Pyaar	Noor Jehan and Munir Hussain	Tanvir Naqvi	Koel (1959 film)
Dil Ka Diya Jalaya Mein Ne, Dil Ka Diya Jalaya	Noor Jehan	Tanvir Naqvi	Koel (1959 film)
O' Bewafa, Mein Ne Tujh Se Pyar Kyun Kiya	Noor Jehan	Tanvir Naqvi	Koel (1959 film)
Tere Bina Sooni Sooni Laage Re Chandani Raat	Noor Jehan	Tanvir Naqvi	Koel (1959 film)
Saagar Roey Lehrein Shor Machaain, Yaad Piya Ki Aaey Naina Bhar Aaen	Noor Jehan	Tanvir Naqvi	Koel (1959 film)
Raqs Mein Hai Sara Jahan, Aayega Koi Shah-e-Khubaan	Nahid Niazi and others	Tanvir Naqvi	Ayaz (1960 film)
Sallu Alaihi Wa Aalihee, Jo Na Hota Tera Jamalihee	Zubaida Khanum and Kausar Parveen	Tanvir Naqvi	Ayaz (1960 film); Another popular Na'at song
Kabhi Tum Bhi Hum Se Thay Aashna, Tumhein Yaad Ho Ke Na Yaad Ho	Noor Jehan		Film producer/ music director Khwaja Khurshid Anwar used this 'borrowed' original ghazal by the 19th-century poet Momin Khan Momin (1800-1851) in his film – Ghunghat (1962 film)
Ja Ke Susral Gori, Maikay Ki Laaj Rakhna	Noor Jehan, Naseem Begum and Mala Begum	Qateel Shifai	Haveli (1964 film)
Kali Kali Mandalaaye Bhanwara, Kahin Bhi Chaen Na Paey, Harjai Kehlaae Bhanwara	Noor Jehan	Tanvir Naqvi	Chingari (1964 film)
Ae Roshanion Kay Shehar Bata	Mehdi Hassan	Tanvir Naqvi	Chingari (1964 film)

== Death and legacy ==
Khurshid Anwar died on 30 October 1984 at age 72 in Lahore after a protracted illness and was laid to rest at Miani Sahib Graveyard. In recognition of his contributions to enrichment of film music, the Bollywood film industry awarded him the coveted Mortal-Men-Immortal-Melodies Award (1982). Great Urdu poet of 20th century, Faiz Ahmad Faiz was a lifelong friend of Khurshid Anwar. During an interview, in reply to a query of Anwar Maqsood, Faiz acknowledged that he was inspired by Khurshid Anwar.

He has also been praised for his efforts to keep alive classical music not only through his compositions but also through his unique collection of classical music (considered his magnum opus) performances recorded by EMI Pakistan, known as Aahang-e-Khusravi in two parts in 1978. Raag Mala has ten audio cassettes that include 90 Raags in ten Thaths. Each Raag has a short introduction in the voice of Khurshid Anwar explaining the characteristics of the Raag followed by its audio performance by renowned classical singers of Pakistan. The second part of Aahang-e-Khusravi is Gharanon Ki Gaiyki on 20 audio cassettes which consists of audio recordings of representatives of the main Gharanas of classical singers in Pakistan.

== Musicologist ==
In recognition of his services for the cause of music, he was awarded the coveted Sitara-e-Imtiaz award by the Government of Pakistan in 1980. His activity in 1976 was to pay tributes to a historical music legend Amir Khusro (1253 A.D.- 1325 A.D.) on the occasion of this music innovator's 700th Birth Anniversary Celebrations in Pakistan. The above-mentioned music recordings by EMI Pakistan and the accompanying book on the history of music by Khurshid Anwar were all part of those celebrations.

== Awards and recognition ==
- Nishan-e-Imtiaz (Order of Excellence) Award by the President of Pakistan in 1982.
- Sitara-e-Imtiaz (Star of Excellence) Award by the President of Pakistan in 1980
- 3 Nigar Awards for Best Music in film Zehr-e-Ishq (1958), film Ghunghat (1962 film) and Punjabi language film Heer Ranjha (1970)
- Mortal-Men-Immortal-Melodies Award in 1982 in India
