= Changez Khan (1958 film) =

Pakistani historical film

- Directed by: Rafiq Sarhadi
- Written by: Hassan-ud-Din
- Produced by: Hassan-ud-Din
- Starring: Asha Posley; Allauddin; Husna; Rakhshi
- Music by: Rashid Attre
- Release date: 24 January 1958
- Country: Pakistan
- Language: Urdu

Changez Khan is a 1958 Pakistani historical film directed by Rafiq Sarhadi. It was based on Naseem Hijazi's novel Akhari Chattan. Hassan-ud-Din played the titular role in the film, who also wrote the screenplay and produced the film as well. The other cast includes Asha Posley, Kamran, Allauddin, Fazal Shah and M. Ismael.

Changez Khan is one of the earliest films of the Pakistani cinema of the historical genre.

Its production had almost completed in 1956 but the film was released in 1958.

The film features the popular and evergreen national or milli song of Inayat Hussain Bhatti, Aye Mard-e-Mujahid Jaag Zra, Ab Waqat-e-Shahadat Hai Aaya, written by Tufail Hoshiarpuri and music by Rashid Attre.

== Cast ==
- Hassan-ud-Din
- Asha Posley
- Husna
- Kamran
- Allauddin
- Fazal Shah
- Rakhshi
- Ghulam Mohammad
- M. Ismael
- Ghulam Qadir
- Mushir Kazmi
