= Chann Mahi =

1956 Pakistani film by Anwar Kamal Pasha

- Directed by: Anwar Kamal Pasha
- Written by: Sheikh Iqbal
- Produced by: Anwar Kamal Pasha
- Starring: Bahar Begum; Asif Jah; Aslam Pervaiz; Nighat Sultana; M. Ismail
- Music by: Rasheed Attre; Film song lyrics: Tufail Hoshiarpuri
- Release date: 2 November 1956
- Country: Pakistan
- Language: Punjabi

Chan Mahi is a Pakistani Punjabi-language film released on 2 November 1956. The film, directed by Anwar Kamal Pasha, became a popular musical film with many super-hit film songs.

Producer and director Anwar Kamal Pasha introduced actress Bahar Begum in this film who later became a well-known film actress both in Punjabi and Urdu language films. She stayed very active from the 1950s to the 1980s in Pakistani film industry.

== Cast ==
- Bahar Begum
- Asif Jah
- Aslam Pervaiz
- Nighat Sultana
- M. Ismail

== Some popular songs ==
- "Bundey Chaandi Dey Sonay Di Nath Ley Ke, Aaja Ho Belia" Sung by Zubaida Khanum, lyrics by Tufail Hoshiarpuri, and music by Rasheed Attre
- "Ni Chithhiey Sajana Diye, Teinun Ghutt Ghutt Japhian Panwaan, Tey Sadaqay Janwaan" Sung by Zubaida Khanum, lyrics by

Tufail Hoshiarpuri and music by Rasheed Attre

- "Pheir Layyan Chann Mahi Akhhian, Dubb Gaey Aas Dey Taaray" Sung by Zubaida Khanum, lyrics by Tufail Hoshiarpuri and music by Rasheed Attre
- "Mahi Maut Da Suneha Ditta Kahll Wey, Ais Dunia Taun Duur Dila Chall Wey" Sung by Zubaida Khanum, lyrics by Tufail Hoshiarpuri and music by Rasheed Attre
