= Nighat Sultana =

Pakistani actress

- Born: Gulzar Begum; 27 February 1935; Kurdistan, Iraq
- Died: 16 December 2002 (aged 67); Karachi, Sindh, Pakistan
- Occupation: Actress
- Years active: 1953 - 2002
- Spouse: Hassan Tariq (m. 1959; div. 1961)
- Children: Tahir Hassan (son); Reena (daughter)
- Parent: Hasan Ali (father)

Nighat Sultana (Punjabi, Urdu: نگہت سلطانہ; 27 February 1935 – 16 December 2002) was a Pakistani actress. She acted in both Urdu and Punjabi films and is known for her roles in films Chann Mahi, Umar Marvi, Saat Lakh, Insaf, Insan Badalta Hai, Neend, Dil Mera Dharkan Teri, Afsana Zindagi Ka and Kabhi Alwida Na Kehna.

== Early life ==
Nighat's father, Hasan Ali, was from a Bengali family who worked in the army and was sent to Iraq during World War I; there he married an Iraqi Kurd woman. Nighat was born in 1935 in Kurdistan, Iraq. When Nighat was fourteen years old her parents left Iraq and settled in Pakistan at Karachi.

Nighat's father wanted her to become a doctor. She studied nursing and became a nurse and worked in an army hospital before joining films. After some time, her father Hasan suffered from an ailment that rendered him blind. Nighat became the only earner of the family, but the money was not enough and she decided to go to Lahore in the hopes of becoming an actress.

In 1953, Nighat went to Lahore and there she met director Aslam Irani, who cast her in his film Tarrap, also starring Sudhir, Shammi and Allauddin.

== Career ==
She made her debut as an actress in 1953. She appeared in the films Pasban, Nooran, Teray Baghair, Insaf, Tamanna, Rahguzar and Mitti Dian Moortan. In 1962, her role of a handicapped woman of a poor family from the Walled City of Lahore in Riaz Shahid's Susral earned her critical acclaim. Then she changed her name to Nighat Sultana and later appeared in the films Pazeb, Koh-e-Noor, Afshan, Salgira, Jaisay Jantay Nahin and Afsana Zindagi Ka. In 1956, she played the leading role in the country's first Sindhi language film Umar Marvi. Since then she appeared in films Zanjeer, BeGunah, Sukh Ka Sapna, Lakhpati, Jan-e-Bahar and Shehbaz.

== Personal life ==
She married director Hassan Tariq in 1959 soon after the release of the film Neend. They had first met on the set of 1957 film Saat Lakh, where he was working as chief assistant director. She had two children with Hassan Tariq, a son named Tahir Hassan and a daughter actress Reena. Hassan divorced her in 1961 and she took custody of her children.

== Death ==
Nighat died at her home in Karachi in 16 December 2002.

== Filmography ==
=== Television ===
Year	Title	Role	Network
1993	Zameen	Neelam	PTV

=== Film ===
Year	Film	Language
1953	Tarrap	Urdu
1953	Mehbooba	Urdu
1954	Raat Ki Baat	Urdu
1956	Umar Marvi	Sindhi
1956	Mandi	Urdu
1956	Pawan	Urdu
1956	Chann Mahi	Punjabi
1957	Aas Pas	Urdu
1957	Thandi Sarak	Urdu
1957	Nooran	Punjabi
1957	Shohrat	Urdu
1957	Saat Lakh	Urdu
1957	Pasban	Urdu
1958	BeGunah	Urdu
1958	Sassi Punnu	Sindhi
1958	Lakhpati	Urdu
1958	Tamanna	Urdu
1958	Jan-e-Bahar	Urdu
1959	Teray Baghair	Urdu
1959	Neend	Urdu
1960	Rahguzar	Urdu
1960	Insaf	Urdu
1960	Hamsafar	Urdu
1960	Shehbaz	Urdu
1960	Mitti Dian Moortan	Punjabi
1960	Zanjeer	Urdu
1961	Mangol	Urdu
1961	Bombay Wala	Urdu
1961	Insan Badalta Hai	Urdu
1962	Sukh Ka Sapna	Urdu
1962	Susral	Urdu
1963	Suhag	Urdu
1963	Seema	Urdu
1964	Pani	Punjabi
1964	Pyar Na Kar Nadaan	Urdu
1964	Ashiana	Urdu
1964	Ishrat	Urdu
1964	Chingari	Urdu
1965	Nain Mily Chain Kahan	Urdu
1965	Chor Darwaza	Urdu
1965	Dil Ke Tukre	Urdu
1965	Coffee House	Urdu
1966	Qabeela	Urdu
1966	Koh-e-Noor	Urdu
1967	Riasat	Urdu
1967	Shola Aur Shabnam	Urdu
1968	Zalim	Urdu
1968	Dil Mera Dharkan Teri	Urdu
1968	Saiqa	Urdu
1968	5 Darya	Punjabi
1969	Salgira	Urdu
1969	Jaisay Jantay Nahin	Urdu
1970	Rangu Jatt	Punjabi
1971	Afshan	Urdu
1972	Afsana Zindagi Ka	Urdu
1972	Pazeb	Urdu
1973	Jawani Di Hawa	Punjabi
1976	Taqdeer Kahan Lay Ayi	Urdu
1976	Beyond the Last Mountain	English
1978	Mehman	Urdu
1981	100 Rifles	Urdu
1981	Meray Apnay	Urdu
1983	Kabhi Alwida Na Kehna	Urdu
1983	Deevangi	Urdu
