= Salma (1960 film) =

1960 film

- Directed by: Ashfaq Malik
- Written by: Nazir Ajmeri
- Produced by: Ashfaq Malik
- Starring: Allauddin; Bahar; Yasmin; Ejaz
- Music by: Rashid Attre
- Release date: 17 June 1960
- Country: Pakistan
- Language: Urdu

Salma is a 1960 Pakistani film directed by Ashfaq Malik and written by Nazir Ajmeri.

It was Allauddin's first appearance in a leading role. A film from the Golden Age of Pakistani cinema, it explores the themes such as the importance of education for girls and the necessity of mutual consent in marital relationships.

A moderately successful film of 1960, it was remade in 1980 as Saima, starring Babra Sharif and Nadeem.

== Plot ==
Fazlu is a quarrelsome, uneducated and unemployed man from a lower-class family, who lives with her mother who hardly makes the both ends meet. His sister, Hameeda is a devoted housewife whose husband Khalil is not happy with her due to lack of mutual understanding between them. He wants to marry again with Salma due to the reason. When Salma visits Khalil along with her mother, Fazlu comes there for her sister by which Salma learns that he is already married.

Salma who doesn't like Fazlu due to her previous unpleasant interactions with him, gets his marriage proposal from her teacher. On revealing the Fazlu as a bridegroom-to-be, Salma's mother leaves his house denying furiously. Fazlu's mother dies there shortly afterwards, and after her death Salma helps him as he has no means of livelihood. She helps him as she likes him but he considers her favors as a price of her sister's life as Khalil still wants to marry her.

Khalil feels guilty when Hameeda has a road accident while caring for him. He apologizes to her and thanks Salma for helping him realize his mistake. She then starts teaching and educating Fazlu.

== Cast ==
- Bahar as Salma
- Allauddin as Fazal Muhammad “Fazlu”
- Yasmin as Hameeda
- Ejaz as Khalil
- Bibbo as Salma's mother
- Salma Mumtaz as Fazlu's mother
- Talish as Khalil's father
- Rekha as Khalil's mother
- A. Shah Shikarpuri

== Release ==
The film was released on 17 June 1960, in the theaters of Karachi and Lahore, and celebrated golden jubilee at the main cinema.

== Soundtrack ==
All lyrics are written by Tanvir Naqvi, Qateel Shifai and Zahoor Nazar; all music is composed by Rashid Attre

Salma
No.	Title	Lyrics	Singer (s)	Length
1.	"Zindagi Hai Ya Kisi Ka Intezaar"	Tanvir Naqvi	Noor Jehan
2.	"Sanwariya, Mann Bhayo Re"	Zahoor Nazar	Naseem Begum
3.	"Jee Bhar Ke Nazar, Takte Ho Idhar"	Qateel Shifai	Naseem Begum
4.	"Aye Jan-o-dil Ke Malik, Kyun Mujh Se Tu Khafa Hai"	Zahoor Nazar	Naseem Begum
5.	"Jab Badli Mein Chanda Chhup Jaye"	Zahoor Nazar	Naseem Begum
6.	"Kali Kali Raat Mein, Bhayya Barsat Mein"	Zahoor Nazar	Batish
7.	"Ghari Ghari, Yun Khari Khari"	Tanvir Naqvi	Saleem Raza
