= Bibbo =

Bibbo may refer to:

- Bibbo Bibbowski, an American comic book character
- Bibbo (actress), composer, singer and actress in both Indian and Pakistani films
