= Zahida Parveen (singer) =

Pakistani singer

- Born: Zahida Parveen Begum; 1925; Amritsar, Punjab, British India
- Died: 15 May 1975 (aged 49–50); Lahore, Pakistan
- Other names: The Nigtingale; The Queen of Kafi
- Education: Patiala Gharana School
- Occupations: Singer; Playback singer, actress
- Years active: 1940 – 1975
- Children: Shahida Parveen (daughter)
- Relatives: Peeran Ditti (sister)
- Awards: Gold Medal award from All Pakistan Music Conference in 1964

Zahida Parveen (1925 – 15 May 1975) was a Pakistani classical singer and film playback singer.

She was known as The Nightingale and The Queen of Kafi.

== Early life ==
Zahida Parveen was born in 1925 at Amritsar, Punjab in British India. She came from a family of classical musicians. Her parents died when she was very young so she was raised by one of her sisters, Peeran Ditti. She joined Patiala gharana school of classical music to learn singing from sarangi player Baba Taj from Kapurthala. Zahida Parveen initially began her career as a tawaif and was well known for singing Multani kafi. Then she studied with Hussain Bakhsh Khan, a sarangi player from Amritsar. Modern critics argue that Zahida Parveen belonged to the 'Peerni' (saintly figure) caste.

== Career ==
After the partition of India, she moved to Pakistan and learned singing from Ashiq Hussain of Patiala Gharana in Lahore. Then she started singing at Radio Pakistan, Lahore. In 1949, she worked as a film playback singer and recorded a qawwali with Iqbal Bano and Munawar Sultana in the film Mundri. The qawwali was composed by G.A. Chishti.

At Radio Pakistan, she performed the songs "Kya Haal Sunawan Dil Da" and "Maindi Ajj Kal Akh Phurkaandi Aei", a composition of Khwaja Ghulam Farid with kafi style; the songs were recorded for His Master's Voice on gramophone and became popular hits. Then she recorded many more Kafis in Urdu, Saraiki, Hindi, Punjabi and Sindhi languages for His Master's Voice recordings, as well as for radio and on-stage.

In the 1940s, she began to sing songs for films in Kheyal style and in classical vocalization and she did playback singing by singing light classical music in different forms like in geets and ghazals. In 1957, she along with Ustad Fateh Ali Khan recorded a song Nain Se Nain Milae Rakhoni Ko for film Waadah (1957 film), the song was composed by Rashid Attre.

In 1958, she worked in film Begunah and sanged a classical song Kaisi Raat Rageeli Aai in duet with Naseem Begum. The same year she was hired again by music composer Rashid Attre for film Jan-e-Bahar and was paired with Naseem Begum. The duo sang the song Ab Tou Ji Bhar Ke Khanjar Chalaenge Hum in raag darbari style.

In 1964, she was honoured by All Pakistan Music Conference with a Gold Medal Award for her contribution to the music industry.

== Personal life ==
Zahida was married and had a daughter named Shahida Parveen. She also wanted her daughter to be a singer. So she trained her daughter in a similar style and Shahida became a student of Ustad Akhtar Hussain Khan at the insistence of her mother.

== Death ==
Zahida Parveen died at the age of 50 on 15 May 1975, in Lahore, Pakistan. She was laid to rest in Miani Sahib Graveyard.

== Filmography ==
Year	Film	Language
1949	Mundri	Punjabi
1950	Anokhi Dastan	Urdu
1951	Billo	Punjabi
1953	Barkha	Urdu
1953	Shehri Babu	Punjabi
1955	Pattan	Punjabi
1956	Morni	Punjabi
1956	Dulla Bhatti	Punjabi
1957	Waadah	Urdu
1957	Yakke Wali	Punjabi
1958	Begunah	Urdu
1958	Jan-e-Bahar	Urdu
1958	Darbar	Urdu
1959	Bacha Jamoora	Punjabi
1964	Baap Ka Baap	Urdu
1965	Dil Ke Tukre	Urdu

== Awards and recognition ==
Year	Award	Category	Result	Title	Ref.
1964	All Pakistan Music Conference	Gold Medal Award	Won	Radio & Music	
