= Salim Iqbal =

Film music composers from Pakistan (1933 - 1996)

- Born: Iqbal Hussain (1931 – 8 April 1996); Saleem Hussain (1933 – 2 April 1996) (Two brothers music composers duo)
- Died: 2 April 1996 (younger brother died); 8 April 1996 (older brother died); Lahore, Punjab, Pakistan
- Occupation: Music composers for Pakistani films
- Years active: 1958 – 1980

Saleem Iqbal (1933 – 8 April 1996) was a Pakistani film music composers duo.

== Early life ==
This duo comprised two brothers – the older brother Iqbal Hussain (1931 – 8 April 1996) and the younger one Saleem Hussain (1933 – 2 April 1996) – who composed music for over 30 films in Pakistan. Both brothers were born in the residential neighbourhood of Bhati Gate, Lahore, British India.

== Career ==
During the 1940s, both brothers, who were in their teens at the time, used to stage the play Heer based on the epic love story of the 18th-century Sufi poet Waris Shah in the narrow streets of the Walled City of Lahore. The two brothers got their early training in the art of singing from their father Master Ilm Din, who was a local professional musician. Later, Saleem Hussain became associated with the film composer Feroz Nizami as his assistant, after the independence of Pakistan in 1947.

== Film songs ==
Song title	Sung by	Lyrics by	Music by	Film notes
Sayyo Ni Mera Dil Dharkay	Zubaida Khanum	Iqbal Hussain	Saleem Iqbal	This was their first career breakthrough hit song from film Sheikh Chilli (1958)
Desaan Da Raja, Meray Babul Da Pyara, Veer Mera Ghori Charhia	Zubaida Khanum and Naseem Begum	Iqbal Hussain	Saleem Iqbal	Their second big hit song which became so popular that it is still sung at wedding events even today. Film Kartar Singh (1959), film producer Saifuddin Saif.
Peireen Beirrian Pazaiban Diyyan Paa Ke, Mahi Ne Teinun Lei Jana Ni	Naseem Begum and Nazir Begum	Waris Ludhianvi	Saleem Iqbal	Film Kartar Singh (1959)
Gori Gori Chandani Di Thandi Thandi Chhaan Ni	Zubaida Khanum	Waris Ludhianvi	Saleem Iqbal	Film Kartar Singh (1959)
Ajj Aakhan Waris Shah Nu, Kittay Qabaraan Vichon Bol	Inayat Hussain Bhatti and Zubaida Khanum	Amrita Pritam	Saleem Iqbal	Film Kartar Singh (1959)
Ajj Mukk Gai Ae Ghaman Wali Shaam, Teinun Sada Pehla Salam	Inayat Hussain Bhatti, Saleem Raza and Ali Bakhsh Zahoor	Saifuddin Saif	Saleem Iqbal	Film Kartar Singh (1959)
Piya Naa Hi Aaye, Sakhi	Ustad Amanat Ali Khan and Noor Jehan	Saifuddin Saif	Saleem Iqbal	Film Darwaza (1962)
Dil Ke Afsane Nigahon Ki Zabaan Tak Pohnchay	Noor Jehan	Ahmad Rahi	Salim Iqbal	Film Baaji (1963)
Chanda Tori Chandani Mein, Jia Jala Jaaye Re	Naseem Begum	Ahmad Rahi	Salim Iqbal	Film Baaji (1963). Naseem Begum won the 'Best Singer' Nigar Award for this song in 1963.
Geo Dhola, Geo Dhola	Noor Jehan	Hazin Qadri	Salim Iqbal	Film Phannay Khan (1965)
Ae Rah-e-Haq Ke Shaheedo Wafa Ki Tasweero	Noor Jehan	Mushir Kazmi	Salim Iqbal	Film Maadr-e-Watan (1966)
Jaan Bujh Ke Tuun Rah Mera Dakkia, Wey Mundia Tu Kehrey Pind Da	Noor Jehan	Khawaja Pervaiz	Salim Iqbal	Film Dukh Sajana Dey (1973)
Sahnu Nehar Waley Pull Te Bula Ke, Te Khowray Mahi Kithay Reh Gaya	Noor Jehan	Rauf Sheikh	Saleem Iqbal	Film Dukh Sajana Dey (1973)
