= Teri Yaad =

Pakistani film

- تیری یاد
- Directed by: Daud Chand; Ram Lal
- Screenplay by: Khadim Mohiudin
- Story by: Sardari Lal
- Produced by: Sardari Lal; D.P. Singha
- Starring: Jahangir Khan; Sardar Muhammad; Ghulam Muhammad; Najma; Rani Kiran; Nazar; Asha Posley; Nasir Khan; Ghulam Qadir; Ragni; Shakir; Shola
- Cinematography: Raza Mir
- Edited by: Rashid Latif (Pappu)
- Music by: Inayat Ali Nath
- Release date: 7 August 1948
- Country: Pakistan
- Language: Urdu

Teri Yaad (Urdu: تیری یاد; Your Memory) was a Pakistani Urdu-language film released on 7 August 1948 in the newly formed country, Pakistan on Eid.

It starred Nasir Khan and Asha Posley in lead roles.

It was the first film released after the independence of Pakistan on 14 August 1947.

== Plot ==
Teri Yaad is the story of a wealthy man before his death. He leaves all his wealth to his newborn daughter, and the newborn son of a dear friend in their names. After the rich man's death, his friend becomes greedy and sets his sights on all of the deceased's property. To grab the property, he poisons the milk of his newborn daughter, which kills the girl. When the rich man's widow and the girl's mother learns of this, she uses a doctor to intimidate the greedy man and forces him to flee the city. Then she adopts an orphan girl and presents her as her own daughter, with the aim of obtaining the property as per her late husband's will. The widow raises the orphaned girl who falls in love with the friend's son, which is not acceptable for the widow. She gets her revenge when friend committed suicide and then the lovers are united.

== Cast ==
- Nasir Khan
- Asha Posley
- Nazar
- Jahangir Khan
- Sardar Muhammad
- Rani Kiran
- Zubaida
- Ghulam Muhammad
- Najma
- Ghulam Qadir
- Ragni
- Shakir
- Shola

== Production ==
=== Background ===
The year 1947 saw the partition of India and the birth of the nation of Pakistan. During this time, the Indian film industry was segregated and the only film production centre left in Pakistan was at Lahore. With the industry reeling in its infancy, it was hard to work on film productions that had been initiated before the partition as many of the working filmmakers and actors had left for or stayed back in India.

=== Music ===
With many hardships, the new film industry was able to release its first feature film, Teri Yaad (1948) on 7 August 1948, premiering at the Parbhat Theatre in Lahore. It starred Asha Posley and Nasir Khan, brother of renowned Indian actor Dilip Kumar who had stayed back in Bombay, India. The playback soundtrack was written and composed by Inayat Ali Nath, Posley's father. The playback singers were Munawar Sultana, Asha Posley and Ali Bakhsh Zahoor. One of the songs featured the line, "Teri Yaad Aye Aye Aur Beeti Beeti Baton". The soundtrack itself was a pioneering effort, showcasing the inaugural artists of Pakistan's film music scene. The film's music was very popular among the audience and Asha Posley loved the song very much. She would fondly sing Teri Yaad Aye song on Radio Music and Television Music Shows. Produced by Dewan Sardari Lal's Dewan Pictures and directed by Daud Chand, the film stayed for a significant time on the celluloid screens in Lahore, Quetta and Dhaka.

== Soundtrack ==
While Inayat Ali Nath provided the music direction, the lyrics were penned by Qateel Shifai, Saifuddin Saif, Tanvir Naqvi and Tufail Hoshiarpuri while the songs were sung by Munawar Sultana, Ali Baksh Zahoor and Nath's daughter Asha Posley (who sang for herself on screen).

Song	Singer(s)	Lyricist	Performer(s)
"Bol Bol Vairniya, Main Gayi Thhi Kahan..."	Munawar Sultana and Ali Baksh Zahoor	Tufail Hoshiarpuri	Asha Posley and Nasir Khan
"Ae Dilwalo, Saajan Gaye Hum Ujar Gaye..."	Munawar Sultana	Tufail Hoshiarpuri	
"Chhalki Jawani, Hey Jiya Mora Dolay..."	Munawar Sultana	Saifuddin Saif	?
"Hamen Chhor Na Jana Ji, Munh Mor Na Jana Ji..."	Munawar Sultana	Saifuddin Saif	?
"Humein Toh Intezar Thha, Sara Chaman Bol Raha Hai Papiha..."	Asha Posley	Saifuddin Saif	Asha Posley
"Main Titli Banke Aayi, Joban Ne Li Angraayi..."	Asha Posley	Saifuddin Saif	Asha Posley
"Kya Yaad Suhani Aayi, O Manchle, Yaad Hai Man Mani..."	Asha Posley	Tanvir Naqvi	Asha Posley
"O Teri Yaad Aye, Aye Beeti Baton Ke Afsane Dohraye..."	Asha Posley	Tanvir Naqvi	Asha Posley
"Dukh Ki Mari Barson Apne Bhaag Ko Roye..."	Asha Posley	Qateel Shifai	Asha Posley
"Mohabbat Ke Mara Chale Jaa Rahe Hain..."	Ali Baksh Zahoor	Qateel Shifai	

== Crew ==
	Name
Producer	Dewan Sardari Lal, D.P. Singh
Writer(s)	Khadim Mohayuddin
Musician(s)	Inayat Ali Nath, (ass.: Anwar Kareem Daad)
Poet(s)	Tanvir Naqvi, Qateel Shafai, Saifuddin Saif, Tufail Hoshiarpuri
Singer(s)	Munawar Sultana, Asha Poslay, Ali Bakhsh Zahoor
Camera	Raza Mir (ass. A. Hameed)
Sound	Z.A. Baig (ass. Mushtaq Rizvi)
Eidtor	M.A. Latif (ass. S.K. Hussain)
Processing	Pyaray Khan (ass. Waris, Shamim, Sunnay Laboratory)
Electrician	Dost Mohammad (ass. Rafiq Sarhadi, M. Ashraf)
Still Photography	Abdullah
Mackup	Latif Hussain
Dresses	Altaf Hussain
Art	Chodhary Sultan (ass: Ghulam Nabi, Fazal Ahmad)
Production chief	Ram Dial
Production Manager	M. Safdar
Publicity	Hamid, Meraj
Studio Engineer	Latif Durrani
Studio	Pancholi Art Studio, Lahore

== Release and box office ==
The film was released in Eid and Teri Yaad ran for five weeks on its main cinema in Lahore. It did average business, also in Karachi where it ran for five weeks on its main cinema. It was also released in Dhaka was the capital of East Pakistan and Quetta. Teri Yaad received "average reviews" in Pakistan.

== Legacy ==
The production of Teri Yaad occurred following the migration of numerous artists and technical personnel to India. As a result, the film was completed in Lahore using limited resources and under restrictive circumstances. Its release marked the establishment of an early domestic filmmaking presence in the newly independent nation.

=== Historical significance for Pakistani cinema ===
Posley became the first female lead of the new Pakistani film industry. As the first film released in Pakistan after independence, Teri Yaad marked the start of the Lahore film industry later known as Lollywood. It was followed by more successful films, such as Shahida (1949) and Do Ansoo (1950), the latter achieving silver jubilee status.
