= Naheed Niazi =

Pakistani playback singer

- ناہید نیازی
- Born: Shahida Khan Niazi; 26 February 1941 (age 85)
- Occupation: Playback singer
- Years active: 1957 – 1971 (Retired)
- Awards: Pride of Performance Award by the President of Pakistan in 1970

Naheed Niazi (born 26 February 1941) is a former Pakistani playback singer who performed in the Lollywood movies during the 1960s. She was married to musician Muslehuddin. She is known for her playback songs, "Chali Re Chali Re Chali Re, Main To Des Piya Ke Chali Re", "Raat Saloni Ayi", and others.

== Life and career ==
Naheed was born as Shahida Niazi on 26 February 1941. Her father Sajjad Sarwar Khan Niazi was a poet and musician, and was also a director at Radio Pakistan. He was also an uncle of the former Deputy Chairman Planning Commission of Pakistan M.M. Ahmad and the cricketer-politician Imran Khan. Her sister is Pakistani playback singer Najma Niazi.

Naheed started her career in 1957 by singing a song for the movie Laila Majnu under the music direction of Rashid Attre, while she was still a student at St Joseph's Convent School, Karachi. Though the first song she recorded was "Mil Gaya Dil Ko Qarar" in Ayaz (1960) for Khawaja Khurshid Anwar though the film released later. One of her earlier songs was "Jaag Taqdeer Ko Jaga Loon Gee" was composed by Muslehuddin for the film Aadmi (1958). She became well-known in both entertainment and mainstream music because of that song. Then Nahid's rendition of her father Sajjad Sarwar Niazi's poem "Ik Baar Phir Kaho Zara" was also much appreciated. In 1961, she became a well-known playback singer because by vocalizing a duet with Ahmed Rushdi, "Raat Saloni Aaye", again composed by Muslehuddin for the movie, Zamana Kya Kahega (1961 film).

In 1962, the Urdu film Daal Mein Kala included a Naheed's song "Samajh Na Aaye Dilko Kahan Lay Jaa Oon Sanam" (Musician: Muslehuddin).

She sang another duet with Ahmed Rushdi, "Raat Ho Gaye Jawan" for the movie Dil Nay Tujhay Maan Liya. The song "Husn Bhi Mauj Mein Hai" for the movie Mujhay Jeenay Do (1968) was recorded in the voice of Naheed and is one of her notable melodies.

When the song "Chum, Chum, Chum, Milay Hain Sanam, Lut Gaye Hum, Allah Qasam" was first played on Radio Pakistan, Naheed touched the peak of her singing career. Later, she recorded several songs during the short time she was a singer. Aside from Moslehuddin, Naheed rendered her voice for nearly all the notable composers of Lollywood film industry, including Rasheed Attre, Khwaja Khurshid Anwar, Nashad, Safdar Hussain, Rehman Verma, Saif Chughtai, Khalil Ahmed, Nisar Bazmi, Master Inayat Hussain, Robin Ghosh, Sohail Rana, and Saleem Iqbal.

== Personal life ==
Naheed married the music director Muslehuddin in January 1964, who had composed most of her songs. The couple left Pakistan for the UK after 1971. Later, her husband Muslehuddin died in 2003 in London.

== Television ==
Both Naheed Niazi and her husband Muslehuddin hosted a television musical show for children on PTV in the late 1960s.

== Awards and recognition ==
- Pride of performance Award by the President of Pakistan in 1970.

== Discography ==
Naheed sang more than 330 songs in Urdu, Punjabi, and Bengali languages, including both film and non-film tracks:

- "Mohe Piya Milan Ko Jaane De" — Movie: Zehr-e-Ishq (1958), Music: Khwaja Khurshid Anwar
- "Chali Ray, Chali Ray, Chali Ray," picturized on Musarrat Nazir, Film: Jhoomer (1959), Lyrics: Tanvir Naqvi, Music: Khwaja Khurshid Anwar
- "Sayyan Jee Ko Dhoond Nay Chali Jogun Bun Kay", picturized on Neelo, music by Safdar Hussain, film Nagin (1959)
- "Kaisa Safar Hai Kahiye, Yoon He Qareeb Rahiye" (duet: Naheed Niazi-Ahmed Rushdi).
- "Tujh Ko Maloom Naheen"
- "Na Koi Sayyan Mera, Na Koi Piya Ray", Film: Jhoomer (1959)
- "Aa Tujh Ko Suna Oon Lori, Halaat Say Chori Chori".
- "Zamana Pyar Ka Itna Hee Kum Hai, Ye Na Jana Tha" Film: Aadmi (1958), Music: Muslehuddin, Lyrics: Majrooh Sultanpuri
- "Akasher Oi Mitimiti Tarar Sathe"
- "Raqs Mein Hai Sara Jahan" Film: Ayyaz (1960), Music: Khwaja Khurshid Anwar, Lyrics: Tanvir Naqvi
- Raat Saloni Aayee Baat Anokhi Layee - Duet with Ahmed Rushdi, Film: Zamana Kya Kahega (1961), Music: Muslehuddin, Lyrics: Fayyaz Hashmi
