= Tehzeeb (1971 film) =

1971 Pakistani film

- Directed by: Hassan Tariq
- Written by: Ibrahim Jalees
- Produced by: Safdar Masud; Hassan Tariq
- Starring: Rani; Shahid Hamid; Rangeela; Aliya; Sabiha Khanum; Ilyas Kashmiri; Zumurrud; Aslam Pervaiz
- Music by: Nisar Bazmi
- Release date: 20 November 1971 (Pakistan)

Tehzeeb (transl. Culture) is a 1971 Pakistani film directed by Hassan Tariq. It stars Rani, Shahid, Sabiha Khanum, Rangeela, Aslam Pervaiz and Lehri.

The makers of this film were asked to change a reference to Egypt (Misr in Urdu language) because it might prove detrimental to diplomatic relations with that country. While the line Laga hai Misr ka bazaar dekho (transl. Come see the Egyptian market) changed to Laga hai husn ka bazaar dekho (transl. Come see the market of beauty) in the movie soundtrack, audio-recordings of the film song had already sold in good numbers.

== Plot ==
The plot revolvers around a family whose matriarch Dadi Amma has a great pride in following eastern traditions and values. When her grandson returns from abroad after getting higher education, he starts hating these traditions, and Chandni, his yet to be wife. He first refuses to marry her but later obliges to do due to the fear of being deprived off. After marriage, he forces her to adapt the western lifestyle and values. One day, she becomes the victim of assault by a club owner while adapting the western culture.

== Cast ==
- Rani
- Shahid Hameed
- Rangeela
- Aslam Pervaiz
- Lehri
- Tamanna
- Sabiha Khanum

== Music ==
A popular song of this film was:

- "Laga Hai Husn Ka Bazaar Dekho" Sung by Mehdi Hassan and solo by Noor Jehan, lyrics by Saifuddin Saif and music by Nisar Bazmi.

== Reception ==
Tehzeeb was a super-hit film of 1971.

The Statesman said the presentation of the film as hackneyed and formula-oriented.
