= Munawar Sultana (singer) =

Pakistani radio and film singer (1924 - 1995)

- Born: Munawwar Sultana; 1925; Ludhiana, Punjab, British India
- Died: 20 May 1995 (aged 69–70); Lahore, Punjab, Pakistan
- Occupation: Playback singer / Radio artist
- Years active: 1948 – 1995

Munawar Sultana (Punjabi, Urdu: منور سلطانہ) (1925 – 20 May 1995) was a Pakistani radio and film singer. She is known for vocalizing the first-ever hit Pakistani film songs, including: Mainu Rab Di Soun Tere Naal Piyar Ho Gya (Film: Pheray 1949), Wastae Rab Da Tu Jaanvien Way Kabootra (Film: Dulla Bhatti 1956), and Ae Quaid-e-Azam, Tera Ehsan Hay, Ehsan (Film: Bedari 1957).

== Early life ==
Sultana was born in Ludhiyana, British India in 1925.

== Career ==
Munawwar Sultana started her career in the mid-1940s as a radio singer. She received her early music education from a composer Abdul Haq Shami. She also took music lessons from the legendary film music director Master Ghulam Haider. Then she also closely collaborated with film music director Ghulam Ahmed Chishti.

Chishti and Munawwar Sultana are credited for reviving the Lahore-based Pakistani film music industry. Her debut film in India was Dhamki (1945) as a playback singer. Then in Pakistan, it was "Teri Yaad", which was also the first movie of Lollywood, released in 1948. She sang for both Urdu and Punjabi movies and recorded 181 songs for 54 films. She is credited for vocalizing film songs that became popular among the public in the first decade of a young Lollywood. Apart from playback singing, Sultana also recorded many semi-classical songs for Radio Pakistan.

== Personal life ==
Munawwar Sultana was married to Ayub Romani who was a station director at Radio Pakistan, Lahore. She quit singing after her marriage, and committed herself to a domestic life and social welfare activities.

== Popular songs ==
=== Film ===
- Menu Rabb Di Sohn Teray Naal Pyar Ho Geya, Wey Channan Sacchi Mucchi ... (1949) (Film: Pheray - Punjabi), Music: G.A. Chishti, Poet: G.A. Chishti (Pakistan's first Punjabi silver jubilee film)
- Way Akhian Lavin Na, Tay Fer Pachhtavin Na ... (1949) (Film: Pheray - Punjabi), Singer(s): Munawar Sultana, Inayat Hussain Bhatti, Music: G.A. Chishti, Poet: G.A. Chishti
- Teray Long Da Peya Lashaka, Halian Nay Hull Dukk Lay ... (1950) (Film: Laray - Punjabi), Singer(s): Inayat Hussain Bhatti, Munawar Sultana, Music: G.A. Chishti
- Way Main Bol Bol Thakki, Teinu Tol Tol Thakki ... (1950) (Film: Laray - Punjabi), Singer(s): Munawar Sultana, Music: G.A. Chishti, Poet: G.A. Chishti
- Dil Ko Laga Ke Kahin Thokar Na Khana, Zalim Zamana Hai Yeh Zalim Zamana... (1950) (Film: Beqarar, Singers: Munawwar Sultana and Ali Bakhsh Zahoor, Music: Master Ghulam Haider, Poet: Tufail Hoshiarpuri
- Baddal Nu Hath Lawan, Tay Uddi Uddi Jawan, Hawa Day Naal ... (1955) (Film: Heer- Punjabi), Singer(s): Munawar Sultana & others, Music: Safdar Hussain, Poet: Hazin Qadri
- Wasta e Rabb Da, Tu Javin Way Kabootra ... (1956) (Film: Dulla Bhatti - Punjabi), Singer(s): Munawar Sultana, Music: G.A. Chishti, Poet: Tufail Hoshiarpuri
- O Dilla Kachya, Qarar Daya Pakkya, Kissay Day Naal Gall Na Karin ... (1956) (Film: Guddi Gudda - Punjabi), Singer(s): Munawar Sultana, Music: G.A. Chishti, Poet: Wali Sahib
- Ik Chor Ik Lutera... (1956) (Film: Sarfarosh, Singer:Munawar Sultana, Music: Rashid Attre, Poet: Tufail Hoshiarpuri
- Ae Qaid-e-Azam, Tera Ehsan Hay, Ehsan ... (1957) (Film: Bedari - Urdu), Singer(s): Munawar Sultana & others., Music: Fateh Ali Khan, Poet: Khawar Zaman

=== Radio ===
- Main Aarzoo e Jaan Likhoon Ya Jaan e Aarzoo, Poet: Akhtar Sheerani
- Chand Roshan Chamakta Sitara Rahe, Poet: Shaukat Thanvi
- Sada Chirriyan Da Chamba We Babul Asan Udd Jana (traditional folk song)
- Ni Sawan Gaayay Ni (traditional folk song)

== Death ==
Munawar Sultana died on 20 May 1995 in Lahore.
