= Rafiq Ghaznavi =

Pakistani musician and actor

- Born: 1907; Rawalpindi, British India
- Died: 4 March 1974 (aged 66–67); Karachi, Sindh, Pakistan
- Occupations: Music composer, actor
- Spouse: Anwari Begum
- Family: Agha–Khan family

Rafiq Ghaznavi (1907 – 4 March 1974) was a British Indian and later Pakistani musician and actor who worked in pre-partition Indian cinema and later Pakistani cinema.

== Early life and education ==
Rafiq Ghaznavi's ancestors were from Ghazni, Afghanistan. According to Cinemaazi he was born in Rawalpindi, British India. Other sources, such as Mazhar Iqbal, state that he was born in Dharamshala.

He was educated at Islamia College, Lahore and could speak a number of languages, including Urdu and Persian, but preferred Punjabi in his daily life. Due to his passion for music, he sought classical music training from Patiala gharana ustads Ashiq Ali and Asif Ali and became a popular singer in Lahore.

== Career ==
=== British India ===
He is known for his contributions to Abdul Rashid Kardar's Heer Ranjha (1932), where he played the lead role in the first Punjabi film and also composed the music and sang the songs. As a music composer, some of his important productions include Sohrab Modi's Sikandar (1941) and Mehboob Khan's Taqdeer (1943). In some movies he used all his skills, such as Prem Pujari (1935), having directed it, written both the story and the dialogues, composing and singing the songs as well as playing the lead character.

=== Pakistan ===
After the partition of India in 1947, he settled in Lahore, Pakistan and later moved to Karachi. In Pakistan, he composed music for director Ashfaq Malik's film Parwaaz (1954) and director Aziz Ahmed's film Mandi (1956). He later joined Radio Pakistan and dedicated himself exclusively to radio programs as a music director.

== Death ==
He died in Karachi at the age of 67 on 4 March 1974.
