= Sassi Punnu (1958 film) =

- Directed by: Riaz Ahmed
- Produced by: Riaz Ahmed (Riazi Films)
- Starring: Nighat Sultana; Sayani; Rakhshi
- Cinematography: Pervaiz Akhtar
- Music by: Verma
- Release date: 30 May 1958
- Country: Pakistan
- Language: Sindhi

Sassi Punnu (Sindhi: سَسُئيِ پُنهوُن, Sassui Punhun) is a 1958 Pakistani film adapted from a popular Sindhi folk tale, produced by Syed A. Haroon, directed by Akbar Ali.

It was released on 30 May 1958.

== Cast ==
- Nighat Sultana
- Sayani
- Rakhshi

This is a black and white film in Sindhi language.

== See also ==
- Sassui Punnhun
- Sindhi folklore
- Sindhi cinema
- List of Sindhi-language films
- Sassi Punno- A Pakistani Urdu language film released in 2004
