= Neend =

1959 film

- Directed by: Hassan Tariq
- Written by: Riaz Shahid
- Screenplay by: Riaz Shahid
- Produced by: S. A. Malik; Zaka Ullah Kitchlew
- Starring: Noor Jehan; Neelo; Aslam Pervaiz; Nighat Sultana; Rakhshi
- Cinematography: Raza Mir
- Music by: Rashid Attre
- Release date: 1959 (Pakistan)
- Country: Pakistan
- Language: Urdu

Neend (transl. Sleep) is a Pakistani drama film directed by Hassan Tariq in his directorial debut and released in 1959. Based on a story and screenplay by Riaz Shahid, the films stars Noor Jehan, Neelo and Aslam Pervaiz with Nighat Sultana, Allauddin and Agha Talish in supporting roles. The music was composed by Rashid Attre while Noor Jehan also sang her own songs in the film.

Neend is one of the last films of Noor Jahan, after which she retired from acting. The film was a hit at the box office and was later remade by the director in 1977 as Begum Jaan. BBC Urdu included it in the best selected films of Pakistani cinema. It was screened by Lok Virsa Museum in August 2016, as a part of special feature films screening in the country. The film won 2 Nigar Awards in different categories.

== Plot ==
The story of the film starts from a school where a child is taken for admission. The man who has brought the child there, starts telling a story to the principal how a coal picker on the railway track becomes mother to a child after falling for the lust of a flamboyant rich businessman. The baby's mother shoots and kills the businessman after he refuses to take the baby. She is sent to jail. Here the flashback ends and this is the kid who has come for school admission.

The principal of the school hears this story and admits the child to the school.

== Cast ==
- Noor Jehan
- Neelo
- Agha Talish
- Nighat Sultana
- Allauddin
- Aslam Pervaiz
- Yasmin
- Rakhshi
- Diljit Mirza
- Asad Jafri

== Music ==
All music is composed by Rashid Attre.

Neend
No.	Title	Lyrics	Singer (s)	Length
1.	"Chhan, Chhan, Chhan, Bajay Payal Bajay"	Tanvir Naqvi	Noor Jehan
2.	"Aa Geyi Raat, Naa Aaye Saanwariya"	Qateel Shifai	Noor Jehan
3.	"Akeli Kahin Matt Jana, Jamana Najuk Hai"	Tanvir Naqvi	Zubaida Khanum, Noor Jehan, Naseem Begum & chorus
4.	"Ik Dil Hai Gahak Itne"	Tanvir Naqvi	Zubaida Khanum
5.	"Tere Darr Par Sanam Chale Aaye"	Qateel Shifai	Noor Jehan
6.	"Jiya Dharkay Sakhi Ri Jor Se"	Tanvir Naqvi	Noor Jehan, Naseem Begum
7.	"Mujh Ko Jawani Bari Mehangi Pari Hai"	Tanvir Naqvi	Zubaida Khanum

Qateel Shifai's ghazal "Tere Darr Par Sanam Chale Aaye" was later used in 1993 Hindi film Phir Teri Kahani Yaad Aayee.

== Awards ==
Neend won 2 Nigar Awards for 'Best Music' and 'Best Script' in 1959.
