= Mandi (1956 film) =

1956 film

- Directed by: Aziz Ahmed
- Screenplay by: Mohammad Hassan
- Based on: A short story by Ghulam Abbas
- Produced by: Nisar Ahmad
- Starring: Khurshid; Ayaz; Nighat Sultana; Bibbo
- Music by: Rafiq Ghaznavi
- Production companies: Eastern Studio; Shahnoor Studios
- Release date: 29 June 1956
- Country: Pakistan
- Language: Urdu

Mandi (transl. Market) is a 1956 Pakistani film directed by Aziz Ahmed. It was based on a short story by Ghulam Abbas. The film features Khurshid in her second film in Pakistan and her final film appearance overall, after which she quit acting.

It also stars Ayaz and Nighat Sultana. Khurshid also sang all songs of the film in the music composition of Rafiq Ghaznavi. It was also the last film of Ghaznavi as he shifted to Radio Pakistan after the film's box office failure.

Mandi was commercially unsuccessful. It is among the earliest Karachi-based films. The production of the film started in the Eastern Studio of Karachi, but later on due to unavailability of the technical facilities it shifted to Shahnoor Studios of Lahore.

== Plot ==
The plot revolves around a neighborhood that is right in the middle of the city and where the prostitutes live. For the women of this particular region, the people from different walks of life demand that these women should be banished from the city so that the society can be freed from the moral evils caused by them. Upon struggling to protect their living place, these contractors of morality raise their voices in favor of these women when they receive financial benefits.

== Cast ==
- Khurshid
- Ayaz
- Nighat Sultana
- Shad
- Bibbo
- Kalavati
- Ghori
- Shah Nawaz
