= Sanson Ki Mala Pe =

Qawwali performed by Nusrat Fateh Ali Khan

Single by Nusrat Fateh Ali Khan

from the album Supreme Collection, Vol. 12
- Language: Hindustani (Hindi-Urdu)
- Released: December 1, 1982
- Genre: Qawwali
- Length: 30:05
- Label: EMI Records
- Composer: Nusrat Fateh Ali Khan
- Lyricist: Tufail Hoshiarpuri / Mirabai

Sanson Ki Mala Pe (Urdu: سانسوں کی مالا پہ, lit. 'On the rosary of my breath') is a single by Nusrat Fateh Ali Khan. It was first performed by Khan during his first visit to India in 1979, when Indian actor and filmmaker Raj Kapoor invited him at the wedding of his son Rishi Kapoor. This is a Qawwali performed by the Pakistani singer-songwriter Nusrat Fateh Ali Khan.

When "Sanson Ki Mala Pe" appeared on Nusrat's early commercial releases, beginning with his 1982 album Supreme Collection, Vol. 12, the lyrics were credited simply as “Traditional." This attribution for the lyrics continued on the 1993 album Sanson Ki Mala Vol. 28, the 1994 master edition, and a subsequent release on December 21, 1995, which likewise listed the piece as “Written-By: Traditional.” The ghazal was also formally published in January 1995 in Tufail Hoshiarpuri’s poetry collection Soch Mala, where it appears under his name as "Sanson Ki Mala Pe (Urdu: سانسوں کی مالا پر, translit. sāñsoñ kī mālā par simrūñ nis-din pī kā nām).” In 2001, a further commercial recording of "Sanson Ki Mala" credited Tufail Hoshiarpuri as the lyricist. The lyrics have also been associated with the medieval Bhakti poet Mirabai, largely due to its devotional imagery centered on Krishna-bhakti themes such as Radha–Krishna symbolism and spiritual longing.

On 3 November 1983 at the Wallace Lawley Centre in Birmingham, Nusrat Fateh Ali Khan (NFAK) delivered a powerful live performance of "Sanson Ki Mala Pe" that transformed the poem's reflective verses into an intense Sufi devotional expression, capturing themes of spiritual longing and ecstasy. The recording of this performance was released in 2004 by Oriental Star Agencies, after NFAK's death, showcasing his distinctive blend of classical poetry and qawwali while introducing the work to a wider international audience and reinforcing its enduring place in South Asian musical traditions.

== Remakes ==
"Saanson Ki Mala"

Song by Kavita Krishnamurthy

from the album Koyla
- Language: Hindustani (Hindi-Urdu)
- Released: 1997
- Genre: Filmi; Indian pop
- Length: 6:47
- Label: Tips Industries
- Composer: Rajesh Roshan
- Lyricist: Indeevar

In 1996, the song was recomposed by Nadeem–Shravan for the film Jeet, starring Sunny Deol, Karisma Kapoor, and Salman Khan.

It was also recreated for the 1997 Hindi film Koyla. It was recomposed by Rajesh Roshan, sung by Kavita Krishnamurthy, and picturized on Shah Rukh Khan and Madhuri Dixit.

Later, Michael Winterbottom used the original version of the song as a soundtrack in his 2011 film Trishna, starring Freida Pinto and Riz Ahmed.

In 2020, Rahat Fateh Ali Khan paid homage to his uncle Nusrat Fateh Ali Khan with a cover version of the song, saying, "Sanson Ki Mala [is] a Qawwali very close to my heart, and this time it has been presented as a fusion track, conceptualised by Salman Ahmed. I dedicate the release to my mentor, Ustad Nusrat Fateh Ali Khan, and my father, Ustad Farrukh Fateh Ali Khan."

In 2022, Portuguese guitarist André Antunes released a metal reinterpretation of the song which became a viral sensation on YouTube. The video, titled "Legendary Pakistani Singer goes Metal," features Antunes playing heavy metal guitar riffs over Nusrat Fateh Ali Khan's original vocal performance. This unlikely fusion of Qawwali and metal has garnered millions of views and introduced the timeless masterpiece to a new generation of listeners, unearthing the classic for a global audience and receiving widespread acclaim for its creativity and power.

In 2023, the song was remade as "Simroon Tera Naam" by Manan Bhardwaj and sung by Sachet Tandon for the T-Series Hindi film Yaariyan 2.

In 2026, the song was recreated by Vaibhav Pani and performed by Madhur Sharma for the movie Mirzapur.
