= Umar Marvi (film) =

- Directed by: Shaikh Hassan
- Written by: Qazi Abdur Rahim
- Produced by: Syed Hussain Ali Shah Fazlani, Fazlani Films
- Starring: Syed Hussain Ali Shah Fazlani; Nighat Sultana; Noor Mohammed Charlie; Bibbo
- Cinematography: Suhail Hashmi
- Music by: Ghulam Nabi Abdul Lateef
- Release date: 12 March 1959
- Running time: 113 minutes
- Country: Pakistan
- Language: Sindhi

Umar Marvi (Sindhi: عمر مارئي), (Urdu: عُمَر ماروی), is a Pakistani film adapted from a popular Sindhi folk tale, Umar Marvi, produced by Syed Hussain Ali Shah Fazlani, directed by Shaikh Hassan and starring Fazlani himself, Nighat Sultana, Noor Mohammed Charlie and Bibbo.

== Plot ==
The story of Marvi and Umar is a popular Sindhi folk tale, on which the poet Shah Abdul Latif Bhittai based one of the surs of his Risalo. Umar (Fazlani), king of Umarkot, is looking for a bride but finds none to his liking. Phog (Noor Mohammed Charlie) mentions the unmatchable beauty of Marvi (Nighat Sultana), a village girl from Malir whom he loves but who is engaged to a fellow villager, Khet. Umar decides to see Marvi for himself and immediately falls under her spell. After unsuccessfully asking for her hand from her father, he resolves to abduct her. Confined in Umar's palace, Marvi stubbornly refuses to become his wife, faithful to her pledge to Khet. Turning down silks and jewelry, she longs for her people, the Marus. When Marvi seems about to surrender, having lost hope of being rescued, a wet-nurse reveals that Umar and Marvi are milk siblings, thus ruling out any possibility of marriage between them. Umar then hands Marvi back to her people, but Khet and the Marus suspect her chastity. Upon hearing the news, Umar goes for Malir to defend Marvi's honor. Both have to undergo a trial to prove their innocence by walking through a fire holding a red-hot iron rod. Umar and Marvi come out of the pyre unhurt. In the end, Umar accepts his mistake and blesses Marvi and Khet as they finally marry.

== Cast ==
- Syed Hussain Ali Shah Fazlani as Umar
- Nighat Sultana as Marvi
- Noor Mohammed Charlie as Phog
- Bibbo

== See also ==
- Umar Marvi
- Sindhi folklore
- Sindhi cinema
- List of Sindhi-language films
