= List of Pakistani films of 1950 =

A list of films produced in Pakistan in 1950 (see 1950 in film): A total of 13 films were released in the country.

Opening	Title	Genre	Language	Director	Cast	Notes
6 January 1950	Jahad	Drama	Urdu	Zahoor Raja	Yasmin, Zahoor Raja, Nazar, Ajmal, Nayab Sarhadi, Shakir, Ashiq Hussain, Nawazish Ali	Yasmin starring in her debut role.
3 February 1950	Beli	Drama	Urdu	Masood Pervez	M. Ismail, Santosh, Sabiha, Shahina, Anu Radha, Shakir, Bilal, M.A. Mirza, Reshma, Nadra, Shaheda, Rani Momtaz, Salma	Debut film for Sabiha Khanum and Santosh Kumar as actors in Pakistan.
17 February 1950	Laray	Drama	Punjabi	Nazir	Sawarn Lata, Nazir, Nazar, Allauddin, Baba Alam Siaposh, Zeenat, Farrukh	Another big romantic and musical film from the Pheray-team. It was an all time greatest musical show by legendary music director Baba Ghulam Ahmed Chishti and singers Munawar Sultana and Inayat Hussain Bhatti.
10 March 1950	Ghalt Fehmi	Drama	Urdu	Ahmad Ullah Ajmeri	Asha Poslay, Jahangir Khan, Nazar, Rani Kiran, Sheikh Iqbal, Saleem Raza, Ghulam Qadir, Parveen Begum, Irshad Begum, Zubaida, Mehpara	The first title of this film was Miss 1949. Comedian Nazar was hero and sang few songs as playback singer. Asha Poslay's father music director Inayat Ali Nath wrote songs as I.A. Nazish..
17 March 1950	Hamari Basti	Drama	Urdu	Shakoor Qadri	Murtaza Gilani, Najma, Shah Nawaz	
7 April 1950	Do Ansoo	Drama	Urdu	Anwar Kamal Pasha	Sabiha Khanum, Santosh Kumar, Shamim, Ajmal, Allauddin	This was the first-ever Urdu language 'Silver Jubilee' hit film in Pakistan. It was released on April 7, 1950.
2 June 1950	Judai	Drama	Urdu	Amin Malik	Shahina, Sadiq Ali, Nazar	
17 July 1950	Beqarar	Drama	Urdu	Nazir Ajmeri	Ragni, S. Gul, Shammi, Noor Mohammed Charlie, Majeed	The film was released on July 17, 1950 with hit music by Master Ghulam Haider.
22 September 1950	Shammi		Punjabi	Munshi Dil	Shammi, Santosh, Ajmal, Shola	This film had a super-hit film song that turned out to be a breakthrough song in Pakistan for the music director Master Inayat Hussain who later became one of the top film musicians in the 1950s and 1960s. This film was produced by the renowned singer Malika Pukhraj.
3 November 1950	Kundan		Urdu	M.S. Dar	Ragni, Shakir, Hamaliawala	
17 November	Anokhi Dasta	Drama	Urdu	Sharif Nayyar	Nazir, Nazar	
22 December 1950	Amanat	Drama	Urdu	Hyder Shah	Darpan, Nazar	Darpan's debut film as an actor in Pakistan.
22 December 1950	Gabhroo		Punjabi	Anwar Kamal Pasha	Shamim, Santosh Kumar, Allauddin, Ajmal	

== See also ==
- 1950 in Pakistan
