= Shahida Parveen =

Pakistani singer

- Born: Shahida Parveen Begum; 1953; Lahore, Pakistan
- Died: 14 March 2003 (aged 49–50); Lahore, Pakistan
- Other name: The Queen of Kafi
- Education: Patiala Gharana School
- Occupations: Folk singer; Classical singer
- Years active: 1968 – 2003
- Children: 2
- Parent: Zahida Parveen (mother)
- Relatives: Peeran Ditti (aunt)
- Awards: Pride of Performance Award by the President of Pakistan (2004)

Shahida Parveen (1953 – 14 March 2003) was a Pakistani classical singer and folk singer. She was known as The Queen of Kafi.

== Early life ==
Shahida was born in 1953 in Lahore, Pakistan. Shahida's mother Zahida Parveen was also a classical singer. She was trained in classical music by her mother and later studied music at a Patiala Gharana training school.

At the training school, she studied music and received training in ghazals and Sufi music by Ustad Akhtar Hussain, father of Amanat Ali Khan and Hamid Ali Khan. Later, she was also trained in geets and qawwali by well-known classical singer of the sub-continent Chhote Ghulam Ali Khan.

== Career ==
She started singing at Radio Pakistan Lahore by singing classical music and Sufi poetry. Later she began to sing ghazals on radio and she performed the ghazal Deepak Raag Hai Chahat Apni a composition of Zuhoor Nazar that became popular. In the 1970s, she was called Queen of Kafi due to her singing kafi songs on His Master's Voice radio and stage.

In 1986, she began to sing on Pakistani television (PTV) programs and one of her program Payal Aur Sargam became popular, when she started singing qawwali and Sufi music. Then she began to sing qawwali at private functions and festivals and in the 1990s, she began to sing national songs on television.

In 2004, she was posthumously honored with the Pride of Performance Award by the President of Pakistan which was given to her daughters for her significant contributions to classical music.

== Personal life ==
Shahida was married and she had two daughters.

== Illness and death ==
She was admitted to Shaikh Zayed Hospital after having kidney problem. Later, her condition improved but then her condition deteriorated.

Shahida died from kidney failure after a week long illness at the age of 50 on March 14, 2003, and was laid to rest next to her mother's grave at Miani Sahib Graveyard.

== Filmography ==
=== Television ===
Year	Title	Role	Network
1986	Payal Aur Sargam	Herself	PTV
1992	Mere Naghmay	Herself	PTV
1994	Mehfil-E-Museeqi	Herself	PTV
1998	Meri Pasand	Herself	PTV

== Awards and recognition ==
Year	Award	Category	Result	Title	Ref.
2004	Pride of Performance	Award by the President of Pakistan	Won	Arts	
