= Agha Talish =

Pakistani actor (1923–1998)

- آغا طالِش
- Born: Agha Ali Abbas Qazalbash; 13 November 1923; Ludhiana, Punjab, British India
- Died: 19 February 1998 (aged 74); Lahore, Punjab, Pakistan
- Occupation: Actor
- Years active: 1947–1998
- Spouse: Umrao Begum
- Children: Ahson Talish (son)
- Relatives: Raza Talish (grandson); Agha Jafar (brother)
- Awards: Pride of Performance Award by the President of Pakistan in 1989; 6 Nigar Awards

Agha Ali Abbas Qizilbash (also known as Agha Talish) (Punjabi, Urdu: آغا طالِش) (13 November 1923 – 19 February 1998) was a Pakistani actor who made his debut in 1947 and was mostly known and recognized in Pakistan for playing character actor or villain roles. Talish was honoured by a Pride of Performance award, by the Government of Pakistan in 1989.

== Life and career ==
Talish was born in Ludhiana, British Raj into a Qizilbash family in 1923. His breakthrough film in Pakistan was film producer Saifuddin Saif's Saat Lakh (1957) where his on-screen performance for this popular hit song was widely admired, Yaaro Mujhe Maaf Rakho Mein Nashe Mein Hoon.

On 5 January 1962 Shaheed was released, his biggest hit film. A film on the theme of Palestine with a script by Riaz Shahid and music by Rasheed Attre, it was produced and directed by Khalil Qaiser. The highlight was the instant hit song Uss Be-wafa Ka Sheher Hai Aur Hum Hain Dosto, by renowned poet Muneer Niazi, with musical composition by Rasheed Attre.

== Death ==
Talish died on 19 February 1998 after a long illness at Lahore, Pakistan. He had a 50-year-long film career.

== Filmography ==
Year	Title	Notes
1947	Saraey Kay Baher	
1955	Jheel Kinarey	
1956	Jabroo	
1956	Miss 56	
1956	Baghi	
1956	Guddi Gudda	
1957	Saat Lakh	
1957	Sehti	
1957	Sardar	
1954	Touheed	
1954	Akhri Daao	
1954	Darbar-e-Habib	
1954	Aadmi	
1959	Boodi Shah	
1959	Sachey Moti	
1959	Neend	
1959	Raaz	
1959	Saathi	
1960	Rahguzar	
1960	Yeh Dunya	
1960	Allahdin Ka Beta	
1960	Salma	
1960	Sahil	
1960	Roopmati Baaz Bahadur	
1960	Saheli	
1961	Ajab Khan	
1961	Sunehrey Sapney	
1961	Farishta	
1961	Chotey Sarkar	
1961	Habu	
1961	Do Raste	
1961	Gulfam	
1961	Bara Bajey	
1962	Susral	
1962	Shake Hand	
1962	Azra	
1962	Qaidi	
1962	Paharan	
1962	Shaheed	
1962	Sukh Ka Sapna	
1962	Aulaad	
1962	Ghungat	
1962	Awaz Dey Kahan Hay	
1962	Dosheeza	
1962	Anchal	
1963	Baghawat	
1963	Kala Pani	
1963	Yahoodi Ki Larki	
1963	Baaji	
1963	Daman	
1963	Mahndi Waley Hath	
1963	Chacha Khamkhowah	
1963	Seema	
1964	Chingari	
1964	Lutaira	
1964	Mama Jee	
1964	Piar Na Kar Naadan	
1964	Gehra Dagh	
1964	Shabab	
1964	Beti	
1964	Havaili	
1964	Landa Bazar	
1964	Farangi	
1965	Doli	
1965	Devdas	
1965	Aurat	
1965	Kaneez	
1965	Malangi	
1965	Raqqasa	
1966	Gawandi	
1966	Joker	
1966	Ruswai	
1966	Bharia Mela	
1966	Paidagir	
1966	Payal Ki Jhankar	
1966	Janbaz	
1967	Lakhon Mein Aik	
1967	Zinda Laash	
1967	Kafir	
1967	Shola Aur Shabnam	
1967	Hamraz	
1967	Hamdam	
1967	Imam Din Gohavia	
1968	Lala Rukh	
1968	Zindagi	
1968	Mafroor	
1968	Aurat Aur Zamana	
1968	Saiqa	
1968	Ashiq	
1968	Beti Beta	
1968	Dil Mera Dharkan Teri	
1968	Jang-e-Azadi	
1968	Taj Mahal	
1968	Mera Ghar Meri Jannat	
1969	Andaleeb	
1969	Aneela	
1969	CID	
1969	Diya Aur Toofan	
1969	Jind Jaan	
1969	Neela Parbat	
1969	Piya Milan Ki Aas	
1969	Tere Ishq Nachaya	
1969	Zarqa	
1969	Zindagi Kitni Haseen Hai	
1970	Shama Aur Parwana	
1970	Takht-o-Taj	
1970	Maa Puttar	
1970	Nya Sawera	
1970	Darinda	
1970	Bedardi	
1970	Aik Phool Aik Pathar	
1970	Charda Sooraj	
1970	Rootha Na Karo	
1971	Dotsi	
1971	Bhen Bhara	
1971	Khak Aur Khoon	
1971	Yeh Aman	
1971	Neend Hamari Khwab Tumhare	
1971	Al-Asifa	
1972	Naag Muni	
1972	Bazar	
1972	Mere Hamsafar	
1972	Soudagar	
1972	Khoun Apna Koun Paraya	
1972	Nizam	
1972	Angarey	
1972	Ehsas	
1972	Umrao Jaan Ada	
1973	Aan	
1973	Sarhad Ki Goad Mein	
1973	Jithey Vagdi Ay Ravi	
1973	Sadhoo aur Sheitan	
1973	Baharon Ki Manzil	
1974	Main Bani Dulhan	
1974	Dillagi	
1974	Naukar Wohti Da	
1974	Imandar	
1974	Jawan Mere Des Da	
1974	Laila Majnoon	
1974	Haqiqat	
1974	Bahisht	
1975	Zindagi Tay Toofan	
1975	Izzat	
1975	Farz Aur Mamta	
1975	Bay Aulad	
1975	Milap	
1975	Shireen Farhad	
1975	Zeenat	
1975	Aik Gunnah Aur Sahi	
1975	Naiki Badi	
1975	Ganwar	
1975	Umang	
1976	Hukam Da Ghulam	
1976	Haibat Khan	
1976	Aulad	
1976	Chor Noon Mor	
1976	Kothey Tapni	
1976	Mahboob Mera Mastana	
1976	Zaib-un-Nisa	
1976	Sachai	
1976	Sazish	
1976	Ann Daata	
1976	Insanyat	
1976	Zuroorat	
1976	Kil Kil Mera Naan	
1977	Ishq Ishq	
1977	Haji Khokhar	
1977	Barey Mian Deewaney	
1977	Salakhein	
1978	Aag Aur Zindagi	
1978	Mazi Haal Mustaqbil	
1978	Inqilab	
1978	Seeta Maryam Margaret	
1978	Zindgi	
1978	Haider Ali	
1978	Playboy	
1978	Aankhon Aankhon Mein	
1979	Mohammed Bin Qasim	
1980	Bandish	
1980	Sardar	
1980	Behram Daku	
1981	Dil Ney Phir Yaad Kia	
1981	Watan	
1981	Alahdin	
1981	Basheera Tey Qanoon	
1981	Wafa	
1981	Do dil	
1981	Chan Suraj	
1981	Sultan Tey Varyam	
1982	Bara Bhai	
1982	Aangan	
1982	Tairey Bina Kiya Jeena	
1982	Sangdil	
1982	Aahat	
1983	Dehleez	
1983	Love Story	
1983	Wadda Khan	
1983	Rustam Te Khan	
1983	Kala Samander	
1984	Doorian	
1984	Kalia	
1984	Ucha Shimla Jatt Da	
1984	Chor Chowkidar	
1984	Dulla Bhati	
1984	Ishq Nachavey Gali Gali	
1985	Dhee Rani	
1985	Ashyana	
1985	Deewaney Dou	
1985	Khuddar	
1985	Direct Hawaldar	
1986	Domoro Intiqam (Pushto)	
1986	Baghi Sipahi	
1986	Malanga	
1986	Faisla	
1986	Nazdeekian	
1987	Allah Rakha	
1987	Duniya	
1987	Nijat	
1988	Mukhra	
1988	Roti	
1988	Baghi Haseena	
1988	Bazar-e-Husn	
1988	Bano	
1988	Piasi	
1989	Shaani	
1989	Roop Ki Rani	
1989	Madam Bawri	
1989	Zabardast	
1989	Miss Allah Rakhi	
1989	Karmoo Dada	
1989	Rakhwala	
1989	Achoo 302	
1989	Mohabbat Ho Tau Aisi Ho	
1989	Nangi Talwar	
1989	Zakhmi Aurat	
1989	Gori Dian Jhanjhran	
1990	Bulandi	
1990	Falak Shair	
1990	Dil	
1990	Nag Devta	
1991	Adil	
1993	Zabata	
1994	Mohabbat Ki Aag	
1994	Sarkata Insaan	
1994	Pajero Group	
1995	Mushkil	
1995	Ajab Khan	

== Awards and recognition ==
- Six Nigar Awards in the years 1961, 1962, 1965, 1972, 1975 and 1994
- Pride of Performance award by the President of Pakistan in 1989

== See also ==
- List of Lollywood actors
