= Pagli (film) =

1943 film

- Directed by: Shankar Mehta
- Music by: Ustad Jhande Khan; Govind Ram; Amir Ali; Rasheed Attre
- Distributed by: Maheshwary Pictures (Lahore)
- Release date: 1943
- Country: India
- Language: Hindi

Pagli is a Bollywood film. It was released in 1943.

== Cast ==
- Aruna Devi
- Asha
- S. Kapur
- Raza
- Ramesh
- Anjana
- Bhag Singh
- Noor Mohammed Charlie

== Soundtrack ==
The music of the film was composed by Ustad Jhande Khan, Govind Ram, Amir Ali, Rasheed Attre.
