= Hamraz =

1967 film

- Original title: ہم راز
- Directed by: Khawaja Khurshid Anwar
- Written by: Khawaja Khurshid Anwar
- Produced by: Khawaja Khurshid Anwar; Sheikh Abdur Rashid
- Starring: Shamim Ara; Muhammad Ali; Agha Talish; Lehri; Tariq Aziz; Nabeela; Rangeela; Meena Shorey; Saiqa
- Cinematography: Nabi Ahmad
- Music by: Khawaja Khurshid Anwar
- Release date: 20 October 1967
- Country: Pakistan
- Language: Urdu

Hamraz (Note: alternatively spelled as Hamraaz) is a 1967 Pakistani suspense thriller mystery film directed by Khwaja Khurshid Anwar.

The film was loosely based on Wilkie Collins's 1860 novel The Woman in White. Its stars are Shamim Ara and Mohammed Ali. Agha Talish, Lehri, Tariq Aziz and Meena Shorey appeared in supporting roles. It was released on 20 October 1967. The film is one of Anwar's signature films, for which he wrote the screenplay and composed the music. The plot revolves around the two twin sisters and the conspiracy against them to grab their property.

== Plot ==
At a deserted place, Dr. Javed meets a girl who comes running towards them in a bad condition. He is giving her first aid in his car when some people come and take her away. But she drops a letter in his car, which he later receives. His colleague, Dr. Afandi, tells him about the letter and the girl Bano, the princess of the Qasierabad state. He goes to the palace of the state, Qaiser Mahal, where Bano's uncle, Nawab Ahsan is unhappy on his arrival. The girl also refuses to recognise him. He learns that she has a disease and decides to treat her.

Nawab Ahsan Mirza wants to marry Bano to his mentally challenged son, Nawab Sultan Mirza, so that he becomes the owner of her property. However, Javed discovers this and opposes his decision as a doctor, and he treats her. That night, Nawab tried to kill Javed but failed. In his next meeting with Bano, he finds no marks on her arm that he had observed last night. He discovers that the girl he treated last night was Shehzadi, Bano's twin sister. Nawab Ahsan confesses there that Shehzadi and Bano are twin sisters and presents an older palace servant as a witness, who was Bano's caretaker in childhood.

After revealing his secret that he had hidden to grab both sisters' property, Nawab Ahsan makes his last move with the help of Husan Ara, who is Bano's governess, but she is Nawab's wife. He agrees Shehzadi to sacrifice for her sister by marrying Nawab Sultan instead of Bano for her happiness. He shuts down Bano in the older palace, where he had kept the Shehzadi for years. He orders his servant to set the palace on fire, but he doesn't do so and tries to assault her. She fights him and is saved when Javed reaches there with the help of Afandi and Bano's friend. Nawab Ahsan manipulates his son's mind to kill Shehzadi, and a maid sees him doing this. After marriage, Shehzadi's condition deteriorates further, and she faints.

== Cast ==
- Shamim Ara as Shehzadi/ Gul Bano
- Mohammed Ali as Dr. Javed
- Agha Talish as Nawab Ahsan Mirza
- Lehri as Altaf
- Tariq Aziz as Dr. Afandi
- Nabeela as Fakhra
- Rangeela as Nawabzada Sultan Mirza
- Meena Shorey as Husan Ara Begum
- Ajmal as Rehman Baba
- Saiqa as the maid

== Soundtrack ==
The film's music director was Khwaja Khurshid Anwar, and Qateel Shifai wrote the film songs lyrics.

=== Track list ===
| Title | Singer(s) |
|---|---|
| Janey kal talak teri hayat ho na ho | Noor Jehan |
| Sahelio kahan ho tum awaaz do | Noor Jehan |
| Kahan ho tum sahelio | Noor Jehan and others. |
| Yeh haseen, nazneen, yeh pyar ke dushman haseen | Mehdi Hassan |
| Waada karo, chhor ke na jao ge | Mala |
| Mujhe aise piya ka pyar mile | Mala |
| Kis dil se main jane du tum ko | Mala |
