= Saat Lakh =

1957 Pakistani Urdu film

- Directed by: Jaffer Malik
- Screenplay by: Saifuddin Saif
- Produced by: Saifuddin Saif
- Starring: Sabiha Khanum; Santosh Kumar; Nayyar Sultana; Neelo; Nighat Sultana; Talish; Himalayawala
- Cinematography: Rasheed Lodhi
- Music by: Rashid Attre
- Release date: 1957 (Pakistan)
- Country: Pakistan
- Language: Urdu

Saat Lakh (lit. 'Seven Lakh') is a 1957 Pakistani Urdu film directed by Jaffer Malik and produced by Saifuddin Saif. It stars Sabiha Khanum and Santosh Kumar in the lead roles, with supporting role by Nayyar Sultana and a guest appearance by Neelo. The film is primarily known for its blockbuster music composed by Rashid Attre.

It is recognised as one of the successful Pakistani films of the 1950s. The plot primarily focuses on "money" and other assets of the female lead's father amounting to PKR700,000 that she could inherit if she fulfils the conditions in her father's will. According to that last will and testament of her father, she is only entitled to his property if she marries. Adhering to testator's last wish, the rich heiress betrays a poor man convicted of accidental killing and starts pretending to marry him.

Saat Lakh is the first successful film of Jaffer Malik. It won the inaugural Nigar Award for best film, in addition to 4 awards in others categories. In an article by BBC, the film was included in the list of 10 best films of the Pakistani cinema. The film's success paved the way to establish the careers of Talish, Neelo and Sultana.

== Plot ==
Kausar Bano, an heiress has to marry to spend her financial assets and physical possessions worth PKR seven lakh each such as a bungalow worth PKR seven lakh and other assets also worth seven lakhs as well as cash worth PKR seven lakh. As part of this condition, she makes a plan to marry a convicted man, Saleem Ahmed, and for this purpose calls her lawyer to fulfill legal requirements of marriage. She then takes him to her other home at a hill station for honeymoon but orders the lawyer to come to the hill station along with the police after two days to arrest his convicted husband. However, during the course of those two days Kausar gets attracted towards him whom she pretended to be a true spouse. At the time of his arrest, he learns about her betrayal behaviour and his love for Kausar turns into hatred.

She subsequently tries to prove his innocence and asks the police that he accidentally killed a man who tried to rape a woman for which he was convicted and is a runaway.

== Cast ==
- Santosh Kumar as Saleem Ahmed
- Sabiha Khanum Kausar Bano
- Neelo
- Nayyar Sultana
- Agha Talish
- Himalayawala
- Asif Jah
- Sultan Khoosat
- Nighat Sultana
- Nusrat Kardar

== Soundtrack ==
All lyrics are written by Saifuddin Saif; all music is composed by Rashid Attre.

No.	Title	Lyrics	Singer (s)	Length
1.	"Har Cheez Yahan Bik Jati Hai"	Saifuddin Saif	Kausar Parveen
2.	"Sitamgar Mujhey Bewafa Janta Hai"	Saifuuddin Saif	Zubaida Khanum
3.	"Ghunghat Utha Loon Key Ghunghat Nikaloon"	Saifuddin Saif	Zubaida Khanum
4.	"Qarar Lootnay Waley Tu Qarar Ko Tarsay"	Saifuddin Saif	Munir Hussain
5.	"Yaaro Mujhey Maaf Karo, Mein Nashay Mein Hoon"	Saifuddin Saif	Saleem Raza
6.	"Too Chhuti Ley Key Aa Ja Balma"	Tufail Hoshiarpuri	Zubaida Khanum

Too Chhuti Ley Key Aa Ja Balma and Yaaro Mujhey Maaf Karo were the popular tracks from the film, where the latter was sold over 100,000 copies.

== Awards and nominations ==
Year	Award	Category	Awardee	Result	Ref.
—N/a	Nigar Awards	Best film	Saat Lakh	Won	
—N/a	Nigar Awards	Best Music	Rashid Attre	Won	
—N/a	Nigar Awards	Best Scriptwriter	Saifuddin Saif	Won	
—N/a	Nigar Awards	Best Actress	Sabiha Khanum	Won	
—N/a	Nigar Awards	Best Supporting Actress	Nayyar Sultana	Won	
