= Beqarar =

1950 film

- Directed by: Nazir Ajmeri
- Screenplay by: Nazir Ajmeri
- Story by: F.D. Sharf
- Produced by: Nazir Ajmeri; S. Gul
- Starring: Ragni; S. Gul; Majid; Shammi; Charlie; Irshad Begum
- Music by: Ghulam Haider
- Distributed by: Filmsaz Productions
- Release date: 17 July 1950
- Country: Pakistan
- Language: Urdu

Beqarar is a 1950 Pakistani film directed and co-produced by Nazir Ajmeri under banner Filmsaz Production. The film starred Ragni, S. Gul, Majid, Shammi, Charlie and Irshad Begum. Ghulam Haider was the music composer of the film's soundtrack.

It was Ajmeri's first film in Pakistan after his migration to the country. A flop film of the year, it became popular due to its music. The film which revolves around the theme of growing maximum grains for the country, was termed as ahead of its time by BBC.

== Plot ==
The plot revolves around a poor farmer who is rewarded by the government due to his hard work for the better production of wheat crop. After this out of jealousy, the brutal son of the village landlord becomes his rival. This rivalry deepens further when both of them fall for the same girl and try to win her love.

== Cast ==
- Ragni
- S. Gul
- Shammi
- Irshad Begum
- Majid
- Nazir Bedi
- G. N. Butt
- Maya Devi
- Charlie

== Music and soundtrack ==
Ghulam Haider composed the music of the film. Arsh Lakhnavi and Tufail Hoshiarpuri were the film songs lyricists.

- Dil Ko Laga Ke Kahin Thokar Na Khaana by Munawar Sultana and Ali Bakhsh Zahoor
- O Pardesiya, Bhool Na Jana by Munawar Sultana
- Be-Dard Zamanay Se Kabhi Pyar Na Karna by Pukhraj Pappu
- Mere Dil Ki Dunya Ujar Gayi by Munawar Sultana
- Ulfat Bhari Nazar Ke Isharay Badal Gaye by Ali Baksh Zahoor

== Release ==
Beqarar was released on 17 July 1950. It completed 18 weeks at the Karachi cinema, thus became a flop film. However, its music by Master Ghulam Haider and film songs became popular.
