= Tanvir Naqvi =

Pakistani lyricist and poet

Tanvir Naqvi تنویر نقوی
- تنویر نقوی
- Syed Khursheed Ali a.k.a. Tanvir Naqvi
- Born: Syed Khursheed Ali; 16 February 1919; Lahore, British India
- Died: 1 November 1972 (aged 53); Lahore, Pakistan
- Occupations: Lyricist, Poet
- Spouse(s): Eidan Bai (Noor Jehan's older sister); Later married Tasneem Naqvi
- Children: 4 (2 sons and 2 daughters)
- Writing career
- Pen name: Tanvir Naqvi
- Language: Urdu, Punjabi
- Genres: Gazal, Nazm
- Notable awards: 3 Nigar Awards in 1959, 1960 and 1971
- Musical career
- Origin: Iran
- Occupation: Songwriter
- Years active: 1946 – 1972

Tanvir Naqvi (born Syed Khursheed Ali; 16 February 1919 – 1 November 1972), also spelled Tanveer Naqvi, was a British Indian and later Pakistani film songs lyricist and poet.

He wrote lyrics for over 200 Lollywood and Bollywood films. He made his debut in Indian cinema with the 1941 film Swami, directed by Abdul Rashid Kardar, and later remained active in Pakistani film industry for over fifteen years. Naqvi earned recognition for writing the song "Aawaz De Kahan Hai" for the 1946 film Anmol Ghadi and "Rang Laayega Shaheedon Ka Lahoo" (Eng. "The Blood of the Martyrs Will Bear Fruit") during the 1965 India-Pakistan war to boost the morale of the nation.

== Early life and career ==
He was born in 1919 in Lahore, British India (in modern-day Lahore, Pakistan). He originally belonged to a family of Persian writers from Iran and started writing poetry at the age of 15, He later married notable singer and actress Noor Jehan's older sister, Eidan Bai. His first poetry collection, Sunehre Sapne, was published by the time he was 21, in 1940.

As a film songs lyricist, he started his career around 1946 at early age, but after moving to Pakistan, he wrote lyrics for Urdu and Punjabi language films, including Pakistan's first feature film Teri Yaad. He also wrote for Salma (1960 film), Noor Jehan's first film exclusively as a playback singer.

In 1933, he went to Bombay when the film director Abdur Rashid Kardar invited him there. Prior to his debut in films, he was writing ghazals, but later wrote songs for Hindi, Urdu and Punjabi films. He is also credited for writing lyrics for Pakistan's patriotic song titled "Rang Laye Ga Shaheedon Ka Lahoo", sung by Noor Jehan. He wrote this song from one of his poems. During his career, he wrote two prominent naats such as "Shah-e-Madina Yasrab Ke Wali" and "Jo Na Hota Tera Jamal Hi". Before the split of Indian subcontinent, Naqvi was recognized one of the greatest classical writers in Punjabi poetry and literature between the 1950s and 1970s.

After partition, the Pakistan film industry didn't produce many films, and by the end of 1952, it had made only five films. Later, Khwaja Khurshid Anwar, a Pakistani filmmaker and a music director teamed up with several other people, including Tanvir Naqvi as songwriter. The team succeeded in making some films between 1956 and 1959, focused on psychological issues experienced by actors due to multiple cultural conflicts.

== Filmography ==
Key
†	Remarks denote a short description of the work where available.

#	Title	Year	Type/Credited as	Remarks
1	Anmol Ghadi	1946	Lyricist	Wrote the highly popular song Aawaz De Kahan Hai, composed by Naushad for this film
2	Jugnu	1947	Lyricist	—N/a
3	Teri Yaad	1948	Lyricist	This was the first released film in Pakistan after independence in 1947. However, none of its film songs became popular.
4	Naata	1955	Lyricist	—N/a
5	Shirin Farhad	1956	Lyricist	Tanvir Naqvi wrote the still popular film song for this Indian film Guzra Hua Zamana, Aata Nahin Dobara sung by Lata Mangeshkar, music by S. Mohinder
6	Anarkali	1958	Lyricist	Wrote the song Kahan Tak Sunoge, Kahan Tak Sunauon, sung by Noor Jehan and music composed by Master Inayat Hussain
7	Jhoomer	1959	Lyricist	Wrote the hit song Chali Re Chali Re, Barri Aas Laga Ke Chali Re, sung by Nahid Niazi and composed by Khwaja Khurshid Anwar
8	Neend	1959	Lyricist	Wrote popular film song Akeli Kahin Matt Jana, Zamana Nazuk Hai sung by Noor Jehan, Zubaida Khanum and Nasim Begum, music by Rashid Attre
9	Koel (film)	1959	Lyricist	Won Best Lyricist Nigar Award for film songs in Koel (1959).: Note: Film Koel (1959) was the 'magnum opus (great work)' of Tanvir Naqvi's film career: Wrote the following highly popular film songs: Rim Jhim Rim Jhim Parray Phuaar, Tera Mera Nit Ka Pyaar; Dil Jala Na Dil Waalay sung by Zubaida Khanum, music by Khwaja Khurshid Anwar; Teray Bina Sooni Sooni Laage Re Chandani Raat; Saagar Roey, Lehrein Shorr Machaain, Yaad Piya Ki Aaye, Naina Bhar Aaen; Dil Ka Diya Jalaya Mein Ne
10	Shaam Dhalay	1960	Lyricist	Won Best Lyricist Nigar Award for film songs in Shaam Dhalay (1960)
11	Salma	1960	Lyricist	Wrote the film's popular song Zindagi Hai Ya Kisi Ka Intezar
12	Gulfaam	1961	Lyricist	Wrote the film song Yeh Naz, Yeh Andaz, Yeh Jadoo, Yeh Adaaen sung by Saleem Raza, music by Rashid Attre
13	Ghunghat	1962	Lyricist	Wrote film song Kabhi Hum Bhi Tum Se Thay Ashna, Tumhein Yaad Ho Ke Na Yaad Ho sung by Noor Jehan, music by Khurshid Anwar
14	Azra	1962	Lyricist	Wrote Jaan-e-Baharan-Rashk-e-Chaman film song, sung by Saleem Raza composed by Inayat Hussain
15	Seema	1963	Lyricist	—N/a
16	Hamraz	1967	Lyricist	—N/a
17	Behan Bhai	1968	Scriptwriter	—N/a
18	Att Khuda Da Vair	1970	Lyricist	Wrote the highly popular Punjabi film song Jadon Hauli Jai Laenda Mera Naam, sung by Noor Jehan, music composed by Bakhshi Wazir
19	Dosti (Pakistani film)	1971	Lyricist	Won Best Lyricist Nigar Award for film songs in Dosti (1971) - Chitthi Zara Sayyan Ji Ke Naam Likh De

== Death ==
He died on 1 November 1972 in Lahore, Pakistan and was buried in Miani Sahib Graveyard in Lahore, Pakistan.
