= Tufail Hoshiarpuri =

Film songs lyricist from Pakistan (1914 - 1993)

Tufail Hoshiarpuri (14 July 1914 – 4 January 1993) was a film song lyricist and poet from Pakistan. Among his most famous songs is "Sanson Ki Mala Pe", a qawwali performed by Nusrat Fateh Ali Khan.

== Early life and career ==
Muhammad Tufail was born on 14 July 1914 near Gauran Gate, Sheesh Mahal Bazar in Hoshiarpur, Punjab, British India. His name was later changed to Tufail Hoshiarpuri as his professional name.

He started his career as a school teacher in his hometown Hoshiarpur. As the call for the British to quit India grew, the Pakistan Movement and the All India Muslim League gained popularity. Tufail Hoshiarpuri started reading patriotic poems at Muslim League political gatherings. British authorities suspended him from his job as a school teacher. Agha Saleem Raza, a film actor at the time, introduced him to some film producers and he thereafter launched his career as a film song lyricist in 1946. He wrote songs for some films in British India before the independence of Pakistan in 1947.

After the partition of India in 1947, he migrated to Lahore, Pakistan and started his career as a journalist there. He later joined Radio Pakistan, Lahore in 1952.

== Popular film songs ==
Song title	Sung by	Lyrics by	Music by	Film notes
Ni Suhay Chooray Waliye, Tu Ikbar Aaja	Inayat Hussain Bhatti	Tufail Hoshiarpuri	Master Inayat Hussain	This was a breakthrough hit film song for both the music composer Inayat Hussain and the song lyricist Tufail Hoshiarpuri in newly independent Pakistan, film Shammi (1950)
Dil Ko Laga Ke Kahin Thokar Na Khana, Zalim Zamana Hai Yeh Zalim Zamana	Munawar Sultana and Ali Bakhsh Zahoor	Tufail Hoshiarpuri	Master Ghulam Haider	Beqarar (1950 film)
Raatan Merian Bana Kay Rabba Anherian, Naseeban Waalay Taaray Dubb Gaye	Zubaida Khanum	Tufail Hoshiarpuri	Rashid Attre	Film Shehri Babu (1953)
Bhagan Waleo, Naam Japo Maula Naam	Inayat Hussain Bhatti	Tufail Hoshiarpuri	Rashid Attre	Film Shehri Babu (1953)
Chadd Javin Na Channa Banh Phar Kay	Zubaida Khanum	Tufail Hoshiarpuri	Ghulam Ahmed Chishti	Film Pattan (1955)
Bunday Chandi De Sonay Di Nath Lay Kay	Zubaida Khanum	Tufail Hoshiarpuri	Rashid Attre	Film Chann Mahi (1956)
Wasta-E-Rabb Da Tun Jaain Way Kabootra	Munawar Sultana	Tufail Hoshiarpuri	G. A. Chishti	Film Dulla Bhatti (1956)
Teri Ulfat Mein Sanam, Dil Nay Bahut Dard Sahay	Zubaida Khanum	Tufail Hoshiarpuri	Rashid Attre	Film Sarfarosh (1956)
Pheir Layyan Chan Mahi Akhian, Dubb Gaye Aas Day Taaray	Zubaida Khanum	Tufail Hoshiarpuri	Rashid Attre	Film Chann Mahi (1956)
Saaday Ang Ang Wich Pyar Nay Peengan Payyan Nay	Zubaida Khanum and Saleem Raza	Tufail Hoshiarpuri	Rashid Attre	Film Chann Mahi (1956)
Nain Say Nain Milaye Rakhanay Ko	Bade Fateh Ali Khan, Zahida Parveen and others	Tufail Hoshiarpuri	Rashid Attre	Film Waadah (1957)
Saadi Nazran Taun Hoyiun Kahnu Duur Dass Ja	Inayat Hussain Bhatti	Tufail Hoshiarpuri	G. A. Chishti	Film Zulfan (1957)
Aaye Mausam Rangeelay Suhanay, Jia Na Hee Maanay, Tu Chutti Lei Kay Aaja Balama	Zubaida Khanum	Tufail Hoshiarpuri	Rashid Attre	Film Saat Lakh (1957)
Banwari Chakori Karay Dunya Say Chori Chori, Chanda Say Pyar	Noor Jehan	Tufail Hoshiarpuri	Rashid Attre	Film Anarkali (1958)
Aei Mard-e-Mujahid, Jaag Zara, Abb Waqt-e-Shahadat Hay Aaya	Inayat Hussain Bhatti and others	Tufail Hoshiarpuri	Rashid Attre	Film Changez Khan (1958)
O Dillan Dian Mailian Nay Chann Jayyan Soortaan	Inayat Hussain Bhatti	Tufail Hoshiarpuri	G. A. Chishti	Film Mitti Dian Murtan (1960)

== Awards and recognition ==
- Pride of Performance Award by the President of Pakistan in 1994.

== Death ==
Tufail Hoshiarpuri died on 4 January 1993 and was buried in the Model Town, Lahore graveyard in Pakistan.
