= Rasheed Atre =

Pakistani film music director

Rasheed Attre
- Born: 15 February 1919; Amritsar, British India
- Died: 18 December 1967 (aged 47–48); Lahore, Pakistan
- Other names: Rashid Attre, Abdul Rashid Attra or Rasheed Atre
- Occupation: Film music composer
- Children: Wajahat Attre (son) (also was a noted film music director in Pakistan)
- Awards: Nigar Awards in 1957, 1959 and 1962

Abdul Rasheed Attray, Abdul Rashid Attra or Rasheed Atre (15 February 1919 – 18 December 1967), also known as Rasheed Attre, was a Pakistani film score composer.

== Early life and career ==
Rasheed Attre was born in Amritsar, Punjab, British India in 1919. His father, Khushi Mohammad, was also a singer-musician in his time. Young Rasheed acquired his initial music lessons from Khan Sahib Ashfaq Husain. Sharp enough in the field of learning music, Rasheed soon mastered the musical instruments in general and the tabla, in particular.

In the early 1940s, Rasheed decided to consolidate his efforts towards music composition and started his music career from Mahishori Pictures, Lahore, for whom he composed two songs for the film Pagli (1943). The rest of Pagli's songs were composed by Ustaad Jhanday Khan. Noted Indian singer and actor K. L. Saigal had heard him sing and told his father that 'young Rasheed' should enter the music department.

Rashid Attre was selected as the music director to compose songs for the Bombay Talkies' first Muslim social film Nateeja (1947), whose superhit ghazal ‘Kahan mein aur kahan deen-e-haram ki kashmakash, Nakhshab, kis kay naqsh-e-pa per rakh diya ghabra kay sar mein nay' is popular to date.

After he migrated to Pakistan with his family in 1948, he initially was not able to take full advantage of noted singer Noor Jehan's singing talent, because Noor Jehan, in those days, would sing only for those films in which she also acted. So Rashid Attre used playback singers Zubaida Khanum and Naseem Begum in the early years of his career in Pakistan. Later, when Noor Jehan changed her mind, he composed music for many popular songs by her before he died in 1967.

== Filmography ==
=== In India ===
- Mamta (1942)
- Pagli (1943)
- Panna (1944)
- Shireen Farhaad (1945)
- Kamra No. 9 (1946)
- Nateeja (1947)
- Paaro (1947)
- Shikayat (1948)

=== In Pakistan ===
- Beli (1950)
- Shehri Babu (1953) - Rashid Attre's big breakthrough Punjabi language film in Pakistan
- Roohi (1954)
- Chann Mahi (1956)
- Sarfarosh (1956)
- Waada (1957)
- Saat Lakh (1957)
- Changez Khan (1958)
- Mukhra (1958)
- Anarkali (1958) (music composed by Rashid Attre and Master Inayat Hussain)
- Neend (1959)
- Shaam Dhalay (1960)
- Salma (1960)
- Farishta (1961)
- Gulfaam (1961)
- Shaheed (1962)
- Qaidi (1962)
- Mauseeqar (1962)
- Dulhan (1963)
- Farangi (1964)
- Jeedar (1965)
- Sawaal (1966)
- Mirza Jat (1967)
- Bauji (1968)
- Zarqa (1969)
- Bahisht (1974)

== Selected hit songs ==
- Bar Bar Barsein Moray Nain, Moray Nain Sung by Kausar Parveen and Sharafat Ali, lyrics by Saifuddin Saif, film Waada (1957).
- Jab Teray Shehar Sey Guzarta Huun Sung by Sharafat Ali, lyrics by Saifuddin Saif, film Waada (1957)
- Aaey mausam rangeelay suhanay, tu chhutti le ke aaja balama, Sung by Zubaida Khanum, lyrics by Tufail Hoshiarpuri, film Saat Lakh (1957)
- Qarar lootne wale Tu Pyaar ko Tarsay, Sung by Munir Hussain, lyrics by Saifuddin Saif, film Saat Lakh (1957)
- Banwari chakori kare dunya se chori chori chanda se pyaar, Sung by Noor Jehan, lyrics by Tufail Hoshiarpuri, film Anarkali (1958)
- Sada Hoon Apne Pyar Ki, Sung by Noor Jehan, lyrics by Qateel Shifai, film Anarkali (1958)
- Dila thehr ja yaar da nazara lein de Sung by Munir Hussain, lyrics by Waris Ludhianvi, film Mukhra (1958)
- Allah-O-Akbar aey mard-e-mujahid jaag zara Sung by Inayat Hussain Bhatti, lyrics by Tufail Hoshiarpuri, film Changez Khan (1958)
- Mujh se pehli si Muhabbat meray mehboob na maang Sung by Noor Jehan, lyrics by Faiz Ahmad Faiz, film Qaidi (1962)
- Gulon Mein Rang Bhare, Baad-e-Naubahar Chale, Sung by Mehdi Hassan, lyrics by Faiz Ahmad Faiz, film Farangi (1964)
- Nisar mein teri galion pe aey watan kay jahan Sung by Munir Hussain, lyrics by Faiz Ahmad Faiz, film Shaheed (1962)
- Uss bewafa ka shehr hai aur hum hain dosto Sung by Nasim Begum, lyrics by Munir Niazi, film Shaheed (1962)

== Awards and recognition ==
- Nigar Award for Best Music in film Saat Lakh (1957)
- Nigar Award for Best Music in film Neend (1959)
- Nigar Award for Best Music in film Shaheed (1962)

== Death ==
Rasheed Attre died on 18 December 1967, at the age of 48 due to a massive heart attack.
