= Saifuddin Saif =

Pakistani lyricist, poet, film producer-director (1922–1993)

- سیف الدین سیف
- Born: Saifuddin; March 20, 1922; Amritsar, British India
- Died: July 12, 1993 (aged 71); Lahore, Punjab, Pakistan
- Resting place: near Model Town, Lahore cemetery
- Education: Govt. M.A.O. College Lahore
- Occupations: Lyricist; Poet; Film producer; Director
- Writing career
- Language: Urdu, Punjabi
- Years active: 1948 – 1993
- Subjects: Politics, Entertainment
- Notable awards: Two Nigar Awards (1957); Best Film Saat Lakh (1957); Best Script/Story Writer for film Saat Lakh (1957)
- Movement: Progressive Writers' Movement

Saifuddin Saif (20 March 1922 – 12 July 1993) was a Pakistani lyricist, poet, film producer-director, and the founder of Rehnuma Films, a film studio in Lahore, in 1954.

He was involved in writing poems and lyrics before and after the Partition. However, most of his films written before partition remained unreleased due to political instability in the subcontinent. He was best known for his film Kartar Singh (1959), and is also credited for writing lyrics for Pakistan's historical and first-ever feature film Teri Yaad, which helped him to appear among the prominent writers.

As a poet, he wrote eleven ghazals and four nazms on various subjects, including fifteen on friendship, fifteen on social issues, one on hope, and a poetry collection titled Kham-e-Kakul, also known as Khan-e-Kamal (amazing ruler).

== Early life and education ==
Saifuddin was born on 20 March 1922 in the household of Khawaja Meraj Din and was raised in Amritsar in British India. He received his education from the Govt. M.A.O. College Lahore, but left midway after he was barred from taking the board exams over joining political activism of the Khaksar Movement, a social movement aimed at freeing India from the British Raj.

== Career ==
Saif started his career as a lyricist, but his childhood was originally associated with poetry writings and after leaving the college, he pursued poetry as a career. He migrated to Pakistan following the partition and settled in Lahore where he initially worked as a dialogue writer and lyricist in the cinema of Pakistan. He later established Rahnuma Films, a full-fledged filmmaking production in 1954. He also wrote lyrics for films before partition, but none of the films was released. After his migration to Pakistan, all the films he had worked on were released, and he was subsequently considered one of the prominent filmmakers of Pakistan.

His first film as a lyricist was Hichkolay (1949), and later wrote songs for Amanat in 1950 and Naveli in 1952. His films Ghulam and Mehbooba (both in 1953) are generally recognized as commercially successful. After his commercial success, he established his film company called Rahnuma Films. He also worked as a producer, director and scriptwriter in Raat Ki Baat and Saat Lakh (1957), and Lollywood's historical film Kartar Singh (1959), which is claimed to have covered real events and bloodshed of the 1947 partition.

He wrote the song "Payal Main Geet Hain Chham Chham Ke" for the film Gumnaam (1954) and also songs for the film Qatil (1955).

couplet by Saifuddin Saif

Dekha to phir vaheen thay chalay thay jahan se hum,
Kashti kay saath saath kinaray chalay gaye.

Translation: We found ourselves exactly where we had started our journey,
The coast kept moving as did the boat.

Besides film lyrics, he primarily used to write poems which were sung by the prominent Pakistani singers, including Noor Jehan, Nusrat Fateh Ali Khan, and Mahdi Hasan. Saif wrote a book titled Khan-e-Kamal, comprising a collection of gazals.

=== Work ===
Key
†	Remarks denote a short description of the work where available.

Title	Year	Type/Credited as	Remarks
Teri Yaad	1948	Lyricist	
Hichkoley	1949	Lyricist	
Amanat	1950	Lyricist	
Naveli	1952	Lyricist	
Ghulam	1953	Lyricist	
Mehbooba	1953	Lyricist	
Raat Kee Baat	1954	Writer, producer-director	The film flopped under the Rehnuma Films banner
Gumnaam	1954	Lyricist	
Qatil	1955	Lyricist	
Saat Lakh	1957	Writer, producer	It was Pakistan's first film that won Nigar Awards
Kartar Singh	1959	Writer, producer-director	After the success of film Kartar Singh, he became one of the most sought-after producer/directors in Pakistan
Roopmati Baaz Bahadur	1960	Lyricist	
Darwaza	1962	Producer-director	
Madr-e-Watan	1966	Producer-director	
Kham-e-Kakul	1992	Poetry	Also known as Khan-e-Kamal

== Awards and recognition ==
- Nigar Award for Saifuddin Saif as Best Script/Story Writer for film Saat Lakh (1957)
- Nigar Award for Best Film Saat Lakh (1957)

== Bibliography ==
- Saif, Saifuddin (1992). Kham-e-Kakul. al Hamd Publications.

== Death ==
Saifuddin Saif died on 12 July 1993 in Lahore, Pakistan at age 71 and is buried near Model Town, Lahore cemetery. His life is covered in a MPhil thesis book titled Shair-e-Kujkulah by Robina Shaista.
