= List of Pakistani Punjabi-language films =

Pakistani Punjabi Lollywood films were most popular in the 1960s, a period that was considered their golden age. Lahore has 21 cinemas as of 2014. A list of Pakistani Punjabi films in chronological order is as follows:

== 1949 ==
Title	Director	Cast	Genre	Notes
1949
Mundri	Daud Chand	Ragni, Noor Mohammed Charlie, Rani Kiran, Sheikh Iqbal, Ilyas Kashmiri, Ghulam Mohammed	Drama	Pakistan's largest film company Evernew Pictures, owned by Agha G.A. Gul, released its first Punjabi film Mundri in 1949. Music by Ghulam Ahmed Chishti.
Pheray	Nazir	Sawarn Lata, Nazir, M. Ismael, Nazar, Zeenat Begum, Maya Devi, Baba Alam Siaposh	Musical	Pheray was the first ever Silver Jubilee Punjabi film produced in Pakistan. The film was released on August 3, 1949. Music director Ghulam Ahmed Chishti had many super-hit film songs in this film by Inayat Hussain Bhatti and by Munawwar Sultana.

== 1950s ==
Title	Director	Cast	Genre	Notes
1950
Beli	Masud Pervaiz	M. Ismail, Santosh Kumar, Sabiha Khanum, Shahina	Drama	Debut film for Sabiha Khanum and Santosh Kumar.
Gabhroo	Anwar Kamal Pasha	Shamim Bano, Santosh Kumar, Allauddin	Drama	Music by Ghulam Ahmed Chishti.
Laaray	Nazir	Sawarn Lata, Nazir, Nazar, Allauddin, Baba Alam Siaposh	Drama	The film was released on February 16, 1950 and had music by Ghulam Ahmed Chishti.
Shammi	Munshi Dil	Shammi, Santosh Kumar, Ajmal, Shola	Romance	A film produced by the famous playback singer and film studio owner Malika Pukhraj, with music by Master Inayat Hussain.
1951
Billo	Amjad Hussain	Najma, Darpan, M. Ismail	Romance	Debut film for film playback singer Zubaida Khanum, music by Ghulam Ahmed Chishti.
Chanway	Madam Noor Jehan	Noor Jehan, Santosh Kumar, Jahangir, Yasmin, Ghulam Mohammed, Sultan Khost, Hamalia Wala and Salim Raza	Musical	Madam Noor Jehan started her film career in Pakistan as an actress, singer and director. Super-hit music by Feroz Nizami.
Dilbar	Anwar Kamal Pasha	Najma, Darpan, M. Ismael	Romance	Music by Ghulam Ahmed Chishti.
1952
Nath	Shafi Ejaz	Hafeez Jehan, Haseeb, Talish	Romance	Talish's debut film.
1953
Shehri Babu	Nazir	Sawarn Lata, Santosh Kumar, Nazar, M. Ismael, Allauddin, Zubaida Khanum and Inayat Hussain Bhatti	Romance; Drama	Released on June 13, 1953. Film producer Nazir gave music director Rasheed Attre his debut opportunity in Pakistan with this film and it had many super-hit film songs by him. It turned out to be a landmark movie for Pakistan in many areas besides its superb music and super-hit film songs.
1954
				No noteworthy Punjabi language film was released in 1954.
1955
Bulbul	Daud Chand	Asha Posley, Sudhir, Nazar, Zeenat Begum	Romance	Music by Ghulam Ahmed Chishti.
Heer	Nazir	Sawarn Lata, Inayat Hussain Bhatti, Zeenat Begum, Nazar, Rekha, Imdad and Ajmal	Romance; Drama	The film was released on October 28, 1955. This was a debut film for Safdar Hussain and celebrated its Golden Jubilee mainly due to his superb music.
Patay Khan	M. A. Rasheed	Noor Jehan, Aslam Pervaiz, Zubaida Khanum, Zarif, Musarrat Nazir, Nazar, M. Ismael, Imdad Hussain, Rekha, Allauddin	Drama	Story, dialogue, and songs by Hazeen Qadri. The film was released on November 18, 1955 and was a breakthrough film for music director Akhtar Hussain Akhian, younger brother of music director Master Inayat Hussain.
Pattan	Luqman	Musarrat Nazir, Santosh Kumar, Asha Posley, Nazar, Ajmal, M. Ismael, Ghulam Mohammed, Sultan Khoost, Diljeet Mirza and Allauddin	Drama	The film was released on May 24, 1955 with many super-hit film songs by music director Ghulam Ahmed Chishti.
1956
Chann Mahi	Anwar Kamal Pasha	Bahar, Aslam Pervaiz, Asif Jah, Rekha, Sheikh Iqbal, Gulraiz	Drama	The film was released on November 30, 1956 with music by Rasheed Attre with film song lyrics by Tufail Hoshiarpuri. The film had many super-hit songs by Zubaida Khanum.
Dulla Bhatti	M. S. Daar	Sabiha Khanum, Sudhir, Asha Posley, Asif Jah, Ghulam Mohammed, Sheikh Iqbal	Biography; Drama	The film was released on January 6, 1956 with super-hit music by Ghulam Ahmed Chishti and one landmark film song, "Waasta ee Rab Da Tuun Jaein Wey Kabootra", lyrics by Tufail Hoshiarpuri.
Guddi Gudda	Wali Sahib	Musarrat Nazir, Sudhir, Talish	Drama	The film was released on November 2, 1956 with film song lyrics by Wali Sahib and music by Ghulam Ahmed Chishti. A huge musical hit of 1956 and Sahib's first film in Pakistan.
Jabroo	Muzaffar Tahir	Yasmin, Akmal Khan, Talish	Drama	Super-hit music by Ashiq Hussain, film song lyrics by Saghar Siddiqi and Sikedar.
Mahi Munda	M.J. Rana	Musarrat Nazir, Sudhir, Ajmal, Zarif, Nazar, Ilyas Kashmiri	Drama	The film was released on March 16, 1956. Music by Ghulam Ahmed Chishti with some super-hit film songs.
Morni	Shakoor Qadri	Yasmin, Inayat Hussain Bhatti, Nazar	Romance	Music by Ghulam Ahmed Chishti.
Peengaan	Amin Malik	Musarrat Nazir, Aslam Pervaiz, Allauddin	Romance	Music by Ghulam Ahmed Chishti, film song lyrics by Hazin Qadri.
1957
Bholay Khan	Jamil Mirza	Sabiha Khanum, Aslam Pervaiz, Neelo, Diljeet Mirza	Drama	A flop film of 1957.
Nooran	M.M. Billoo Mehra	Noor Jehan, Sudhir, Zeenat, Nazar, Ajmal, Maya Devi, Agha Salim Raza	Drama	The film was released on May 30, 1957 with many super-hit film songs by music director Safdar Hussain and lyrics by Hazeen Qadri.
Palkan	Amin Malik	Musarrat Nazir, Akmal Khan, Allauddin, Zarif	Romance	An 'average' film of 1957 with music by Ghulam Ahmed Chishti.
Sehti	M.J. Rana	Musarrat Nazir, Akmal Khan, Neelo, Talish	Drama	A flop film of 1957.
Yakke Wali	M. J. Rana	Musarrat Nazir, Sudhir, Neelo, Zeenat Begum, Ajmal, Ilyas Kashmiri, Rekha, Ghulam Mohammed, Iqbal Kashmiri, Zarif	Drama	The film was released on February 22, 1957. It had super-hit film songs by film song lyricist Ahmad Rahi and music by Ghulam Ahmed Chishti. A Golden Jubilee film.
Zulfaan	Agha Hussaini	Bahar, Aslam Pervaiz, Zeenat Begum	Romance	This film had music by Ghulam Ahmed Chishti, and film song lyrics by Tufail Hoshiarpuri.
1958
Choomantar	M.M. Billoo Mehra	Noor Jehan, Aslam Pervaiz, Laila, Zarif, Salim Raza, Allauddin	Drama, Romance	The film was released on April 21, 1958 with mega-hit music by Rafiq Ali and lyrics by Ahmad Rahi.
Ghar Jawai	M. Akram	Bahar, Sultan Rahi, A. Shah Shikarpuri, Asif Jah	Drama	A flop film of 1958 with music by Salim Iqbal.
Jagga		Meena Shorey, Aslam Pervaiz, Ilyas Kashmiri	Drama	A flop film of 1958.
Jatti	M.J. Rana	Musarrat Nazir, Sudhir, Neelo, Rangeela	Romance; Drama	Rangeela's debut film. Music by Ghulam Ahmed Chishti and song lyrics by Ahmad Rahi
Katchian Kalian	Amin Malik	Neelo, Aslam Pervaiz, Zarif, Ajmal	Romance	A flop film of 1958 with music by Akhtar Hussain.
Mukhra	Jafar Malik	Sabiha Khanum, Santosh Kumar, Asha Posley, Nazar, Ghulam Mohammed, Allauddin	Drama	The film was released on June 28, 1958, with music by Rasheed Attre and mega-hit film songs and song lyrics by Waris Ludhianvi.
Shiekh Chilli	Asif Jah	Sabiha Khanum, Aslam Pervaiz, Asif Jah	Comedy	Music by Salim Iqbal; their debut film.
1959
Bachha Jamoora	Aslam Irani	Meena Shorey, Akmal Khan, Nayyar Sultana, Mazhar Shah, Allauddin, Zarif, Ilyas Kashmiri, Ajmal	Comedy	Music by Rafiq Ali.
Bodi Shah	Qalander Ahmad	Bahar, Akmal Khan, Zarif	Comedy	Music by Tufail Farooqi and film song lyrics by Tufail Hoshiarpuri.
Jaidad	Riaz Ahmad Raju	Musarrat Nazir, Aslam Pervaiz, Shamim Ara, Allauddin	Drama	Music by Ashiq Hussain.
Kartar Singh	Saifuddin Saif	Musarrat Nazir, Sudhir, Bahar, Laila, Inayat Hussain Bhatti, Ajmal, Ghulam Muhammad, Fazal Haq, Zarif and Allauddin	Musical; Drama	One of the greatest Punjabi films produced in Pakistan. The film was released on June 18, 1959 and turned out to be a landmark movie for producer-director Saifuddin Saif and music director Salim Iqbal.
Lukkan Mitti	Wali Sahib	Musarrat Nazir, Aslam Pervaiz, Neelo, Zarif	Musical; Drama	Debut film for music director Hassan Latif Lilak in Pakistan.
Naaji	Sabiha Khanum	Sabiha Khanum, Santosh Kumar	Romance	First attempt as a film director by Sabiha Khanum.
Pardesan	M. Naseem	Noor Jehan, Aslam Pervaiz, Asha Posley, Zarif	Drama	The film was released on April 10, 1959 with music by Akhtar Hussain Akhian.
Suchche Moti	Sheikh Iqbal	Neelo, Ejaz Durrani, Talish	Romance; Drama	A flop film of 1959.
Yaar Beli	Khalil Qaiser	Musarrat Nazir, Sudhir, Neelo, Zarif	Romance; Drama	

== 1960s ==
Title	Director	Cast	Genre	Notes
1960
Behrupia	Aslam Irani	Meena Shorey, Akmal Khan, Zarif, Mazhar Shah, Ajmal	Comedy	Music by Tufail Farooqi.
Mitti Dian Murtaan	Riaz Ahmad Raju	Bahar Begum, Aslam Pervaiz, Zarif, Nazar	Drama	The film was released on October 21, 1960. Music by Ghulam Ahmed Chishti with one super-hit film song related to the film's title.
Rani Khan	M. J. Rana	Husna, Akmal Khan, Nazar, Zarif	Drama	Noor Jehan started her solo career as a Punjabi playback singer in this film. The film was released on November 4, 1960.
Sohni Kumharan	Wali Sahib	Bahar, Aslam Pervaiz, Zarif, Ajmal	Romance film based on Punjabi epic love story Sohni Mahiwal	Music by Hassan Latif Lilak and film song lyrics by Hazin Qadri.
1961
Aabroo	Sheikh Abdul Rehman	Bahar, Akmal Khan, Rekha, Ghulam Mohammed, Sikkedar, Ilyas Kashmiri	Romance; Drama	First Pakistani film in Saraiki language. Music by Ghulam Ahmed Chishti, film song lyrics by Sikkedar and Tufail Hoshiarpuri. One super-hit film song sung by Nahid Niazi.
Dandian		Yasmin, Aslam Pervaiz, Munawar Zarif	Comedy	Debut film for Munawar Zarif.
Mangti		Bahar, Aslam Pervaiz	Drama	
Muftbar	Aslam Irani	Musarrat Nazir, Akmal Khan, Zarif, A. Shah Shikarpuri	Romance; Comedy	Music by Tufail Farooqi.
1962
Billo Jee	M. Ejaz	Sawarn Lata, Habib, Nazir	Romance	
Chouhdry	Muzaffar Tahir	Naghma, Akmal Khan, Asif Jah	Drama	
Jamalo	M. J. Rana	Meena Shorey, Asad Bokhari, Naghma	Romance	
Paharan	Farrukh Bokhari	Yasmin, Yousuf Khan, Talish	Romance	
1963
Chacha Khamkha		Laila, Sudhir, Mazhar Shah	Comedy film	
Choorian	Amin Malik	Laila, Akmal Khan, Mazhar Shah, Rangeela	Drama	This super-hit film was released on May 17, 1963. Music by Tufail Farooqi and film song lyrics by Baba Alam Siaposh. It was a Golden Jubilee film of 1963.
Mehndi Wale Hath	S. Suleman	Zeba, Sultan Rahi, Nazar, Talish	Drama	
Mouj Mela	Aslam Irani	Neelo, Habib, Rani	Romance	The film was released on February 26, 1963. It was a Golden Jubilee film of 1963.
Rishta	N. E. Akhtar	Sabiha, Santosh, Rangeela	Drama	Music by Ghulam Ahmed Chishti. This was the debut film of playback singer Masood Rana.
Tees Mar Khan	Haidar Choudhary	Shirin, Allauddin, Zeenat Begum, Asif Jah	Drama	The film was released on August 30, 1963. It was the debut film for the music team of Manzoor Ashra'.
1964
Bharjai	Haider Chaudhry	Bahar, Akmal Khan, Zahoor Shah, Asif Jah, Ajmal, Sawan	Drama	This film did 'average' business at the box office. Music by Manzoor Ashraf.
Daachi	Aslam Irani	Neelo, Sudhir, Naghma, A. Shah, Nazar, Munawar Zarif	Musical, Drama	This film is about a strange camel and a corrupt adviser, film was ad was released on February 15, 1964. It was a landmark movie for playback singer Masood Rana, who shot to fame after a mega-hit film song in this movie. Music by Ghulam Ahmed Chishti.
Ek Perdesi Ek Mutiyar	Luqman	Naghma, Asad Bokhari, Allauddin, Asif Jah	Romance	Music by Salim Iqbal.
Hath Jori	Aslam Irani	Naghma, Akmal Khan, Razia, Munawar Zarif, Rangeela	Drama	The film was released on December 4, 1964. It was a Golden Jubilee film by Ghulam Ahmed Chishti. Film song lyrics by Hazeen Qadri.
Jugni	Shafi Ejaz	Neelo, Yousuf Khan, M. Ismael	Romance	
Laadli	Haider Chaudhry	Nasira, Akmal Khan, Zeenat Begum	Romance	
Lai Lug	Khawaja Mohiuddin	Firdous, Ejaz Durrani, Allauddin	Comedy; Drama	Super-hit music by Master Inayat Hussain.
Malang	A. Hameed	Firdous, Allauddin, Sawan	Drama	
Mama Jee	Amin Malik	Laila, Sudhir, Habib, Talish		
Mera Mahi	M. J. Rana	Neelo, Akmal Khan, Nazar, Asad Bokhari, Zeenat Begum	Romance	A musical hit by music director Ghulam Ahmed Chishti.
Sher Di Bachi	Jafar Bokhari	Neelo, Mohammad Ali, M. Ismael	Drama	
Pani	Jafar Bokhari	Shirin, Akmal Khan, Mazhar Shah	Drama	
Walait Pass	Muzaffar Tahir	Shirin, Akmal Khan, Asif Jah, Zeenat Begum	Comedy, Romance	Music by Ashiq Hussain.
Waris Shah	Saeed Ashrafi	Bahar, Akmal Khan, Meena Shorey, Nasira, Asif Jah	Drama, Romance	This film was based on the love story of Waris Shah and Bhag Bhari. It was released on March 14, 1964. This movie was a biography of the traditional Punjabi epic love story author and 18th century poet Waris Shah.
1965
Chokidar		Naghma, Asad Bokhari, Zahoor Shah	Drama	
Doli	Haider Chaudhry	Naghma, Akmal Khan, Mazhar Shah	Romance; Drama	This was a musical super-hit movie of 1965 with music by Manzoor Ashraf and film song lyrics by Tanvir Naqvi.
Had Haram	Anwar Kamal Pasha	Shirin, Allauddin, Asif Jah	Comedy; Romance	Music by Master Abdullah.
Heer Sial	Jafar Bokhari	Firdous, Akmal Khan, M. Ismael	Musical story based on a Punjabi epic love story	The film was released on September 3, 1965. It was a musical hit with music by 'Bakhshi Wazir and film song lyrics by Tanvir Naqvi.
Ik Si Chor	Amin Malik	Shirin, Allauddin, Yousuf Khan	Drama	Music by Master Abdullah.
Jeedaar	M. J. Rana	Neelo, Sudhir, Habib, Shirin, Rangeela, Munawar Zarif	Musical; Drama	The film was released on November 19, 1965. Music by Rasheed Attre and film song lyrics by Hazeen Qadri. This was a Platinum Jubilee film.
Jhanjhar		Firdous, Habib, Adeeb	Romance	
Malangi	Rasheed Akhtar	Shirin, Akmal Khan, Firdous, Yousuf Khan, Zumurrud, Munawar Zarif	Musical; Drama	The film was released on December 14, 1965. Super-hit music by Master Abdullah and lyrics by Hazin Qadri. It was a Golden Jubilee film of 1965.
Mann Mouji		Shirin, Sudhir, Akmal	Drama	Music by Tufail Farooqi and film song lyrics by Hazeen Qadri.
Phanney Khan		Shirin, Sudhir, Allauddin	Romance, Drama	Super-hit music by Salim Iqbal and film song lyrics by Hazin Qadri.
Pilpili Sahib		Naghma, Akmal Khan, Noor Mohammed Charlie		
Punjab Da Sher		Naghma, Akmal Khan, Mazhar Shah	Drama	
Soukan		Yasmin, Akmal Khan, Mazhar Shah	Drama, Romance	
1966
Bharia Mela	Aslam Irani	Naghma, Akmal Khan, Sawan, Talish, Rangeela, Munawar Zarif	Romance, Drama	A super-hit musical film of 1966 with music by Ghulam Ahmed Chishti.
1967
Mirza Jat	Masood Pervaiz	Firdous, Ejaz Durrani, Aalia, Munawar Zarif, Meena Shorey, Ilyas Kashmiri	Romance, Drama	A Golden Jubilee film of 1967 that was also based on an epic love story of Punjab - Mirza Sahiban. Superb music of Rasheed Attre before he died in 1967. Excellent and super-sentimental film songs by the eminent lyricist Ahmad Rahi.
Imam Din Gohavia	M Saleem and Mohsin Jamali	Firdous, Akmal Khan, Yousuf Khan, Talish, Munawar Zarif	Historical Drama	Music by Ghulam Ahmed Chishti, film song lyrics by Khawaja Pervez
1968
1969
Mukhra Chann Warga	Waheed Dar	Naghma, Habib, Rani, Yousuf Khan	Romance film	This was a super-hit Punjabi film of 1969 with music by Ghulam Ahmed Chishti.

== 1970s ==
Title	Director	Cast	Genre	Notes
1970
Heer Ranjha	Masud Pervez	Firdous, Ejaz Durrani, Zumurrud, Ajmal	Romance, Drama	This was a Golden Jubilee film of 1970 with superb music of Khawaja Khurshid Anwar and lyrics by Ahmad Rahi.
Att Khuda Da Vair	Khawaja Sarfaraz	Naghma, Habib, Iqbal Hassan, Sultan Rahi, Rafi Khawar, Salma Mumtaz	Romance film, Drama	This film had one run-away super-hit film song by Noor Jehan, song lyrics by Tanvir Naqvi and music by Bakhshi Wazir.
1971
1972
Basheera	Aslam Dar	Sultan Rahi, Habib, Rozina, Aalia, Rangeela, Meena Chaudhry, Taya Barkat, Ilyas Kashmiri	Action film	Sultan Rahi got his big breakthrough in the Pakistani film industry by playing the title role of 'Basheera' in this film. A Diamond Jubilee film of 1972. Super-hit music by Kamal Ahmad, film song lyrics by Mushir Kazmi and Bashir Khokhar.
Do Pattar Annaran De	Haider Chaudhry	Rozina, Habib, Ejaz Durrani, Sultan Rahi, Munawar Zarif, Chun Chun	Romance	A Golden Jubilee film of 1972 with super-hit film songs by music director M. Ashraf and lyrics by Khawaja Pervez
Zaildar	Haider Chaudhry	Firdous, Habib, Sawan, Zumurrud	Drama	A musical hit movie of 1972 with music by Ghulam Ahmed Chishti and lyrics by Khawaja Pervez
1973
Ziddi	Iqbal Kashmiri	Yousuf Khan, Firdous, Nabeela, Ilyas Kashmiri	Romance, Drama	This film had superb music by Master Abdullah and film song lyrics by Hazin Qadri. This was a Golden Jubilee film of 1973.
Khushia				
Ik Madari				
Banarsi Thug				
1974
Khatarnak	Rehmat Ali			
Naukar Wohti Da	Haider Chaudhry	Aasia, Shahid, Mumtaz, Afzaal Ahmed, Talish, Munawar Zarif	Romance film	A Platinum Jubilee film of 1974 with super-hit music by Wajahat Attre and lyrics by Khawaja Pervez.
1975
Sharif Badmash	Iqbal Kashmiri	Yousuf Khan, Mumtaz, Sultan Rahi, Aasiya	Drama	A Golden Jubilee film with super-hit music by Master Abdullah
Sultana Daku	Muzaffar Tahir			
1976
Chitra Te Shera	Iqbal Kashmiri	Aasia, Yousuf Khan, Sultan Rahi, Munawar Zarif, Nayyar Sultana	Action film	This was a flop film of 1976.
Jat Kurrian Tau Darda	Syed Kamal	Neelo, Syed Kamal, Nisho, Ishrat Chaudhry, Nazli, Najma, Munawwar Saeed, Rangeela, Aslam Pervaiz, Nazar	Comedy film, Musical film	A Golden Jubilee film of 1976. Super-hit music and film songs by Wajahat Attre, film song lyrics by Khawaja Pervez.
Jano Kapatti				
Badtameez				
Hukam Da Ghulam				
Toofan	Hassan Askari			
1977
Aj Diyan Kurrian	Syed Kamal	Nisho, Neelo, Saiqa, Syed Kamal, Najma, Rangeela, Asha Posley, Nazar	Romance film, Musical film	A Golden Jubilee film of 1977. Super-hit music and film songs by Wajahat Attre and lyrics by Hazin Qadri.
Sadqay Teri Mout Tun				
1978
Ranga Daku	Rauf Abbasi	Aasia, Sultan Rahi, Afzaal Ahmed, Saiqa, Sawan	Action film	A Golden Jubilee film of 1978 with music and hit songs by Wajahat Attre, and lyrics by Hazin Qadri.
Shola				
1979
Maula Jatt	Yunus Malik	Sultan Rahi; Mustafa Qureshi	Action, Crime, Drama, Fantasy, Thriller	The film was released on February 11, 1979. This film was a landmark movie and introduced 'Gandasa culture' violence into the Pakistani Punjabi movies. This trend lasted for over a decade in Pakistan.
Wehshi Gujjar	Yunus Malik	Sultan Rahi, Aasia, Adeeb, Iqbal Hassan, Afzaal Ahmad, Najma, Sawan	Thriller, Drama	This was a Golden Jubilee film of 1979. Music by Tafoo and film song lyrics by Hazeen Qadri.
Hathiar	M. Akram	Aasia, Sultan Rahi, Mustafa Qureshi, Alam Lohar, Sabiha Khanum	Drama, Action film	This was a Silver Jubilee film of 1979 with music by Nazir Ali and film song lyrics by Khawaja Pervez.
Permit				

== 1980s ==
Title	Director	Cast	Genre	Notes
1980
Behram Daku	Rauf Abbasi	Aasia, Sultan Rahi, Allauddin, Talish, Chakori	Action film	A Golden Jubilee film of 1980 with music by Salim Iqbal, and lyrics by Waris Ludhianvi.
1981
Sher Khan	Younus Malik	Sultan Rahi, Anjuman, Iqbal Hasan	Romance, Drama	Platinum Jubilee film of 1981 by film producer Anwar Kamal Pasha. Super-hit film songs by music director Wajahat Attre.
Muftbar				
Chan Varyam	Jahangir Qaisar	Anjuman, Sultan Rahi, Sawan, Mustafa Qureshi, Iqbal Hassan, Ilyas Kashmiri	Action film	A Diamond Jubilee film of 1981. Super-hit music by Wajahat Attre and film song lyrics by Hazin Qadri.
Chan Suraj	Rauf Abbasi	Mumtaz, Sultan Rahi, Mustafa Qureshi, Talish, Rangeela	Action film	Music by Shehzad Arshad
Athra Puttar	Altaf Hussain	Aasia, Sultan Rahi, Mustafa Qureshi, Rangeela, Nanha, Albela, Ali Ejaz	Romance film	A Golden Jubilee film of 1981 with super-hit film songs by music director Wajahat Attre, film song lyrics by Hazin Qadri.
Amanat	Rangeela	Bazgha, Rangeela, Ghulam Mohiuddin, Allauddin, Aslam Pervaiz, Masood Akhtar, Ali Ejaz	Romance film	A Silver Jubilee hit film of 1981 with super-hit songs by music director Kamal Ahmed, and film song lyrics by Waris Ludhianvi and Khawaja Pervez.
Jeedar				
Anokha Daaj				
Khan-e-Azam				
Maula Jatt in London				
1982
Charda Suraj	Bashir Rana	Mumtaz, Sultan Rahi, Aaliya, Mustafa Qureshi, Afzaal Ahmed	Action film	Music by Ustad Tafu and film song lyrics by Khawaja Pervez.
Ik Doli				
Maidan				
Wehshi Daku				
1983
Wadda Khan	Diljeet Mirza	Yousuf Khan, Rani, Sultan Rahi, Mohammad Ali	Drama	Music by Safdar Hussain, lyrics by Waris Ludhianvi
Rustam Te Khan	Altaf Hussain	Anjuman, Yousuf Khan, Sultan Rahi, Mustafa Qureshi	Action film	A Golden Jubilee film of 1983 with music by M Ashraf, lyrics by Khawaja Pervez
Moti Dogar				
Sher Mama				
Dara Baloch				
Des Pardes				
Jatt Te Dogar				
1984
Sajawal Daku	Agha Hussaini	Sultan Rahi, Rani, Mustafa Qureshi, Nanha, Habib, Zumurrud	Drama	A Golden Jubilee film of 1984, music by Nazir Ali
Pukar	Aizaz Syed	Sultan Rahi, Mumtaz, Mustafa Qureshi, Zumurrud, Sangeeta, Adeeb	Drama	Another hit film of 1984, music by Tafoo
Kalia	Waheed Dar	Sultan Rahi, Mumtaz, Mustafa Qureshi	Action film	Music by Wajahat Attre and film song lyrics by Waris Ludhianvi. A Golden Jubilee film.
Jagga Tay Shera				
Sholay				
1985
Ghulami				
Angara				
Khuddar				
Dhee Rani	Altaf Hussain	Ali Ejaz, Anjuman, Yousuf Khan, Nanha, Mumtaz, Talish	Romance film	Music by Wajahat Attray
1986
Yeh Adam	Irshad Sajid	Sultan Rahi, Aasia, Afzaal Ahmad	Drama	Music by Nazir Ali
Mela	Hasan Askari	Sultan Rahi, Anjuman, Ajmal	Romance, Drama	Music by Wajahat Attre
Malanga	Rasheed Dogar	Anjuman, Sultan Rahi, Talish, Mustafa Qureshi, Ilyas Kashmiri	Romance, Drama	This was a Diamond Jubilee film of 1986 with music and super-hit film songs by Wajahat Attre, song lyrics by Waris Ludhianvi
Charda Suraj	Basheer Rana	Mumtaz, Sultan Rahi, Mustafa Qureshi, Ilyas Kashmiri, Rangeela	Action film	A musical super-hit film of 1986 with superb music by Ustad Tafu, film song lyrics by Khawaja Pervez
Baghi Sipahi				
Qaidi				
1987
Gernail Singh	Younus Malik	Anjuman, Sultan Rahi, Mustafa Qureshi, Chakori	Action film	A Golden Jubilee film of 1987, music by Wajahat Attre and lyrics by Khawaja Pervez
Moti Sher				
Disco Dancer				
Silsila				
1988
Mukhra	Iqbal Kashmiri	Nadeem Baig, Babra Sharif, Samina Peerzada, Talish	Romance	This was a super-hit musical film with music by Wajahat Attre, film song lyrics by Khawaja Pervez.
Maula Baksh	Yunus Malik	Neeli, Sultan Rahi, Nadira, Ghulam Mohiuddin, Bahar Begum, Ilyas Kashmiri, Munir Zarif	Romance film, Action film	It was a Golden Jubilee film of 1988 with super-hit film songs by music director Wajahat Attre and film song lyricist Waris Ludhianvi.
Roti				
1989
Kalka				
Sarfarosh				
Gori Dyan Jhanjran	Usmaan Peerzada	Usmaan Peerzada	Drama	

== 1990s ==
Title	Director	Cast	Genre	Notes
1990
Sarmaya	Idrees Khan	Sultan Rahi, Anjuman, Javed Sheikh		
Insaniyat Kay Dushman				
International Guerillas				
Sher Dil				
1991
Kalay Chor		Neeli, Sultan Rahi, Javed Sheikh		
Cobra				
Gandasa				
Riaz Gujjar				
1992
Daku Raaj				
1993
Akri Shehzada				
Zabata				
Zamana				
1994
Saranga				
Ghunda Raj				
International Luteray				
Pajero Group				
Sher Punjab Da				
Zameen Aasman				
1995
Att Khuda Da Wair		Saima, Sultan Rahi		
Chodhary Badshah		Saima, Sultan Rahi		
Dil Da Chor		Nain Tara, Asad		
Gabhar Singh		Saima, Sultan Rahi		
Ishthari Mujrim		Madiha, Sultan Rahi		
Jungle Ka Qanoon				
Khoon Da Hisab		Anjuman, Sultan Rahi		
Madam Rani				
Maine Pyar Kiya		Madiha, Shaan, Nargis		
Mangal Khan		Anjuman, Sultan Rahi		
Mastana Mahi		Rubi, Umar Sharif, Rahi		
Mundra		Saima, Sultan Rahi		
Naam Ki Suhagan		Rubi, Shaan		
Nangay Paun		Iram Tahir, Faisal Qureshi		
Qalandra		Gori, Sultan Rahi		
Sanata		Saima, Sultan Rahi		
Shartia Mithay		Nargis, Babbu Barral		
Shera Malang		Saima, Sultan Rahi		
Sultan-e-Azam		Saima, Sultan Rahi		
Wehshi Aurat		Saima, Sultan Rahi		
1996
Akku Dusnumbri		Saima, Sultan Rahi		
Bazar Band Karo		Nargis, Sultan Rahi		
Choran Da Shehnshah		Gori, Sultan Rahi		
Do Jeedar		Saima, Sultan Rahi		
Foja		Saima, Sultan Rahi		
Ghundagardi		Saima, Sultan Rahi		
Iqtadar		Sapna, Sultan Rahi		
Munda Shararti		Madiha, Gullu, Rambo		
Rani Khan		Saima, Sultan Rahi		
Sub Se Bara Rupiya		Saima, Sultan Rahi		
Zamana 420		Chandni, Sultan Rahi		
1997
Dushman Da Kharak		Neeli, Sultan Rahi		
Jaggat Singh Jagga		Saima, Iqbal Gondal		
Kala Raj	Faiz Malik	Saima, Sultan Rahi, Izhar Qazi, Nargis	Action	Sultan Rahi's last journey was in this film. The film was released on April 18, 1997.
Kalay Naag		Saima, Izhar Qazi		
Kuri Munda Razi		Sahiba, Rambo, Nargis		
Lahoria		Saima, Sultan Rahi		
Soukhan		Saima, Sultan Rahi		
Takkar		Saima, Sultan Rahi		
Teefa Gujjar		Saima, Sultan Rahi		
1998
Choorian	Syed Noor	Moammar Rana, Saima, Nargis, Shafqat Cheema	Action, Romance, Comedy	This was a remake of 1960's film Mirza Jatt. The film was released on October 16, 1998.
Dopatta		Nargis, Javed Hassan		
Hathiara		Saima, Azam Jahangir		
Perdesi		Saima, Shaan, Saud		
Suhag		Saima, Yousuf Khan, Sana		
1999
Babul Da Wehra		Meera, Shaan, Moamar, Babar Ali, Nirma		
Chohdrani		Saima, Shaan, Anjuman, Saud		
Desan Da Raja		Saima, Shaan, Rambo		
Gustakh Akhian		Naila Raza, Aamar Farid		
Paranda		Nadia, Arbaz Khan		

== 2000s ==
Title	Director	Cast	Genre	Notes
2000
Bali Jatti		Saima, Shaan, Moammar Rana, Sana		
Ghabroo Punjab Da		Nazo, Shafqat Cheema		
Ishtehari Gujjar		Sana, Shaan, Saud, Nargis, Shafqat Cheema		
Jatti Da wairr		Anjuman, Saud		
Jug Mahi		Sana, Shaan, Anjuman, Saud, Nargis, Rambo		
Jugg Wala Mela	Parvez Rana	Saima, Shaan, Panna, Shafqat	Action	
Long Da Lashkara		Shaan, Reema, Nargis		
Mehndi Waley Hath	Syed Noor	Saima, Moammar Rana, Babar Ali, Nirma	Romance; Drama	The film was released on August 25, 2000.
Nooran		Saima, Moamar, Babar Ali		
Peengan		Anjuman, Babar Ali, Saud, Nargis		
Reshman		Sana, Moamar, Resham		
Yaar Badshah		Saima, Shaan, Nargis, saud		
Yaar Chan Warga		Saima, Shaan, Saud, Reema, Nargis		
2001
Asoo Billa		Sana, Shaan, Babar Ali, Nargis		
Allah Badshah		Saima, Shaan, Babar Ali, Sana		
Badmash		Sana, Saud, Noor		
Badmash Gujjar		Saima, Shaan Shahid, Nirma, Moammar Rana, saud, Nargis		
Badmash Puttar		Saima, Shaan, Saud, Reema, Khushbo, rambo		
Chan Puttar		Shehzadi, Sardar Mohammad		
Dil Kach Da Khadona		Saiam, Moamar, Resham		
Gujjar 302		Saima, Shaan, Nozo, Babar ali		
Ghunda Tax		Saima, Shaan, Reema, Moamar, Nargis		
Hamayun Gujjar	Pervez Rana	Shaan, Moammar Rana, Saima, Panna, Shafqat Cheema, Sana	Action; Drama	The film was released on August 31, 2001.
Ik Din Sher Da		Shezadi, Azam Jahangir		
Ik Jagga Hor		Saima, Shafqat Cheema, Reema, Moamar Rana, sana		
Makha Jat		Sana, Shaan, Babur		
Mehar Badshah		Sana, Shaan, Babar Ali, Yousuf Khan		
Mera Mahi		Babar Ali, Reema, Saud, Sana		
Mukhra Chan Warga		Shaan, Saima, Reema, Moamar		
Nizam Lohar		Sana, Saud, Noor, Nargis		
Shehnshah		Saima, Shaan, Nawaz		
Sher-e-Lahore		Saima, Shaan, Moamar, Babar Ali, Nirma		
2002
Achhu Sheedi		Saima, Shaan, Babar Ali		
Allah Rakha		Saima, Shaan, Saud, Nirma, Resham, Rambo		
Araen Da Kharak		Yousuf Khan, Saima, Shaan, Moamar, Nirma		
Atif Choudhary		Saima, Moamar Rana, Babar Ali, Saud, Resham, Nirma, Nargis		
Babbu Khan		Saima, Shaan, Reema, Moamar, Saud, Nargis		
Badmash Te Qanoon		Sana, Shaan, Babar Ali, Noor		
Billa		Meera, Lucky, Saud		
Buddha Gujjar	Syed Noor	Shaan, Resham, Saima	Action; Drama	The film was released on December 6, 2002.
Buddha Sher		Yousuf, Saima, Shaan, Babar Ali, Resham, Rambo, Khushbo		
Chan Mehar		Saima, Moamar Rana, Babar Ali, Nirma		
Charagh Bali		Sana, Shaan, Babar Ali, Saud		
Dada Badmash		Yousuf Khan, Saima, Shaan, Moamar, Resham, Meera, Saud		
Dosa		Heera Malik, Resham, Babar Ali, Moamar, Noor, Nirma		
Ik Gujjar So Badmash		Saima, Moamar Rana		
Jagga Tax		Saima, Shaan, Sana, Babar Ali, Saud		
Jee O Jatta		Reema, Saud, Babar Ali, Nargis		
Kalu Shahpuria		Saima, Shaan, Sana, Moamar		
Lahori Ghunda		Saima, Shaan, Babar Ali, Sana		
Majhu Da Wair		Sana, Shaan, Reema, Babar Ali		
Raju Rocket		Saima, Shaan, Moamar, Babar Ali, Resham		
Rano Phaddebaz		Megha, Saud, Asha		
Sher-e-Azam		Saima, Shaan, Resham		
Sher-e-Pakistan		Saima, Shaan, Babar Ali, Moamar Rana, Reema		
Tohfa Pyar Da		Resham, Shaan, Arbaz, Meera		
Waryam		Saima, Shaan, Babar Ali, Sana		
Wehshi Jatt		Noor, Shaan, Badar Munir		
2003
Allah Nigehban		Shaan, Saima, Moamar, Meera		
Foja Amritsaria		Saima, Shaan, Resham, Babar Ali, Saud, Laila		
Jatt Da Wair		Saima, Shaan, Rambo, Yousaf Khan, Saud, Moamar, Resham, Meera, Nirma, Laila		
Jeeva Gujjar		Shaan, Saima, Babar Ali		
Khamosh Pani				
Khar Damagh Gujjar		Sultan Rahi		
Lara Punjab Da		Saima, Shaan, Sana, Babar Ali, Resham, Moamar		
Mehar Da Medan		Sana, Shaan, Babar Ali, Nargis		
Moula Sher		Saima, Moamar, Saud, Nazo		
Pappu Lahoria		Saima, Shaan, Moamar, Meera		
Remand		Saima, Shaan, Babar Ali, Saud, Reema, Laila		
Shagna De Mehndi		Noor, Shaan, Babar Ali, Nargis, Nirma, Moamar		
Sher Puttar		Sultan, Saima		
Ultimatum		Saima, Shaan, Babar Ali		
2004
Bhola Sajan		Saima, Shaan, Babar Ali, Nirma, Rambo, Laila		
Billu Ghantagharia		Saima, Shaan, Babar Ali, Nirma, Laila		
Curfew Order		Saima, Shaan, Moamar Rana, Babar Ali, Rambo, Noor		
Dehshat		Yousaf Khan, Saima, Shaan, Moamar Rana, Nirma		
Dushman Da Kharak		Sultan Rahi		
Guddo Badshah		Saima, Shaan, Moamar Rana, Meera, Saud, Rambo		
Jabroo		Saima, Shaan, Moamar Rana,Meera		
Jaga Baloch		Saima, Shaan, Resham		
Jageer		Saima, Moammar Rana, Babar Ali, Veena		
Medan		Sana, Shaan, Babar Ali		
Mulla Muzaffar		Saima, Shaan, Moamar Rana, Nirma, Rambo, Khushbo		
Munna Bhai		Sana, Shaan, Babar Ali, Moamar, Resham, Nargis		
Nagri Daata Di		Saima, Shaan, Babar Ali, Rambo, Tabinda		
Pagri Sanbhal Jatta		Sana, Moamar, Saud, Yousaf Khan		
Perdesi Aye Watna Nu		Paro, Saud, Moamar, Veena		
Sakhi Sultan		Saima, Shaan, Moamar Rana, Babar Ali, Laila, Yousaf Khan		
Wehshi Haseena		Sana, Shaan, Babar Ali, Laila, Saud		
2005
Bau Badmash		Saima, Moamar, Babar Ali, Saud, Veena		
Bhola Sunyara		Saima, Shaan, Saud, Aliya, Saima Khan		
Kurian Shehar Dian		Saima, Shaan, Resham, Saud, Rambo, Laila		
Pappu Shehzada		Saima, Shaan, Shafqat Cheema		
Sheru Badshah		Khusbu, Shafqat Cheema, Tariq Shah		
Sohna Yaar Punjabi		Sana, Shamyl Khan, Babar Ali		
Wada Chodhary		Saima, Shaan, Babar Ali, Resham, Saud, Yousaf Khan		
Ziddi Rajput	Sangeeta	Sana, Shaan, Saud, Laila, Saima Khan	Action	The film was released on August 12, 2005.
2006
Athra		Sana, Shaan, Saud, Saima Khan, Nirma		
Butt Badshah		Saima, Shaan, Moamar Rana, Resham, Laila		
Chann Badshah		Local cast		
Ibba (Gujjar)		Shaan, Saima, Moammar Rana, Laila, Saima kHan		
Kangan		Sana, Shaan, Ahmad Butt, Jan Rambo, Laila, Veena, Nirma		
Lahori Shehzadey		Sana, Shaan, Saud, Veena Malik		
Mahi Aawe Ga		Sana, Shahid Khan, Babrak Shah		Pashto film actor Shahid Khan's first Punjabi film as a hero.
Majajan	Syed Noor	Shaan, Saima, Madiha Shah, Saud	Musical; Drama	The film was released on January 6, 2006.
Piyo Badmasha Da		Saima, Shaan, Moamar, Saima Khan		
Pappu Gujjar		Saima, Shaan, Moamar Rana, Meera, Saud		
Qaidi Yaar		Saima, Shaan, Babar Ali		
Sharif Gujjar		Sana, Shaan, Saud, Saima Khan, Arbaz		
Yaar Badmash		Saima, Shaan, Saud, Arbaz		
2007
Achhu Lahoria		Nargis, Shaan, Saud, Shafqat Cheema, Nida Ch		
Ajj Da Badmash		Saima, Shaan,Babar Ali, Resham, Tariq Shah, Shafqat		
Bala Badmash		Saima, Shaan, Moamar Rana, Shafqat		
Billo 302		Nargis, Shaan, Babar Ali, Jan Rambo, Saud		
Ghunda No. 1		Saima, Shaan, Nida Chodhary, Saud		
Ghundi Run	Pervez Rana	Nargis, Shaan, Naghma, Sajna	Action	
Manga Gujjar		Saima, Shaan, Moamar Rana, Shafqat		
Mohabbataan Sachiyaan	Shehzad Rafique	Veena Malik, Babrak Shah, Adnan Khan, Maria Khan	Romance; Drama	The film was released on October 14, 2007.
Murshid Badshah		Sana, Haidar Sultan, Arbaz Khan, Shafqat		
Nasha Jawani Da		Saima, Shaan, Sana, Shafqat Cheema, Laila, Arbaz		
Puttar Hamayun Gujjar Da		Nargis, Shaan, Mustafa Qureshi		
Potra Shahiye Da		Sana, Shaan, Saud, Saima Khan, Moamar, Meera, Arbaz		
Suha Jora	Pervez Rana	Nargis, Shaan, Shafqat Cheema		The film was released on May 4, 2007.
Wehshi Rajput		Nargis, Shaan,Moamar, Shafqat Cheema		
2008
Chan Badshah	Muhammad Rasheed Malik	Saima, Moammar Rana, Nirma, Babar Ali, Arbaaz Khan	Action	
Zill-e-Shah	Shaan	Shaan, Saima, Noor	Drama	
Basanti |Shaan, Saima, Shamil Khan|				
Gulabo |Shaan, Saima, Babar Ali, Resham|				

== 2010s ==
Title	Director	Cast	Genre	Notes	
2010
Ilyasa Gujjar	Pervez Rana	Shaan, Nargis		Released on: 17 November 2010 (Eid-ul-Azha)	
Channa Sachi Muchi |Saima, Moamar, Babar Ali, Hina Shaheen |					
Lado Rani |Shaan, Moamar, Nargis, Sila|					
Virsa |Noman Ijaz, Mehreen Raheel|					
2011
Jugni	Syed Noor	Shaan, Saima, Moammar Rana and Arif Lohar		Released on 31 August 2011 (Eid-ul-Fitr)	
Kafira	Saleem Murad	Sajjad Ahmed Warriach, Legendary Shahid Hameed, Shafqat Cheema and Akram Udasm Sobiyah	Love Story	Released on Eid-ul-Azha. Written by Saleem Murad, and produced by Dr. Sajjad Ahmad Warraich (Inqalaab Production). This is the first Punjabi, movie of Pakistan with visual effects and shot with HD cameras. Assistant Director: Naghman Saleem Kafira. Edited by Naghman Saleem and Zeeshan Amjad.	
Aik Aur Ghazi |Saima|					
2012
Shareeka	Syed Noor	Shaan, Saima, Mustafa Qureshi, Irfan Khoosat, Shafqat Cheema and Begam Bihar		Released on 20 August 2012 (Eid-ul-Fitr)	
2013
Zinda Bhaag	Meenu Gaur & Farjad Nabi	Naseeruddin Shah, Khurram Patras, Amna Ilyas, Zohaib, Salman Ahmad Khan and Naghma Begam		Released on 20 September 2013	
Ishq Khuda |Shaan, Saima, Meera, Ahsan Khan|					
2014
Naseebo	Sajjad Rizvi (Parvez Rana)	Shaan, Nargis, Ajab Gul, Dua Qureshi, Zarri, Tafoo, Shafqat Cheema		Released on 28 February 2014	
2015					Mitti Na Pharol Jogiya
Lahoria tay Pishoria	Sangeeta	Shaan, Sana, Arbaz Khan, Laila	Action film	Released on 23 January 2015	
Gujjar Pooray Dinna Da	Malik Imdad Hussain	Nawazish Gujjar	Action film	Released on 24 April 2015	
Razia Phans Gayi Ghundon Mein	Shahid Rana	Nida Chodhary, Ahmad Butt, Madhu, Babar	Comedy stage drama film	Released on Eid-ul-Fitr (1436 hijri), 18 July 2015	
Sohna Gujjar	Rasheed Malik	Saima, Moamar Rana, Saima Khan, Shafqat Cheema	Action film	Released on 25 September 2015 (Eid-ul-Azha (1436 hijri)	
Sami Rawal	Amjad Malik	Zahid Ali, Dua Qureshi, Bahar, Agha Majid, Amjad Rana, Shazib Mirza, Barkha, Khushi Jee, Zolfi	Folk story	Released on 25 September 2015	
2016
Mahi Way	Mohammad Tariq Romi	Taimoor, Fareha, Ameer Ali, Shabana Chaudhary, Azhar Rangeela	Romantic/action film	Released on 8 April 2016	
Zindagi Guzaro Hass kay	Mohammad Shehzad Haidar	Shafaqt Cheema, Sakhawat Naz, Sardar Kamal	Action film	Released on 22 April 2016	
2017
Punjab Nahi Jaungi				Released on 1 September 2017	
2018
Teefa in Trouble					
Load Wedding					
2019
Zindagi Tamasha					

In 2015, only five Punjabi films were made in Lollywood. Punjabi films continued to languish in this year also. Punjabi releases such as Razia Phas Gayi Gundon Main, Shaan's Lahoria tay Pishoria, Gujjar Pooray Dinna Da, Sohna Gujjar and Sami Rawal all failed to make a mark on the box office in Pakistan.

== 2022 ==
Title	Director	Cast	Genre	Notes
Tere Bajre Di Rakhi	Syed Noor	Mustafa Qureshi, Jannat Mirza, Saima Noor, Babar Ali	romance/drama film	Released on May 3, 2022 (Eid-ul-Fitr 2022)
Dum Mastam	Mohammed Ehteshamuddin	Momin Saqib, Amar Khan, Imran Ashraf, Adnan Siddiqui		Released on May 3, 2022 (Eid-ul-Fitr 2022)
London Nahi Jaunga	Nadeem Baig	Humayun Saeed, Mehwish Hayat, Sohail Ahmed, Kubra Khan	Drama	Released on July 10, 2022
The Legend of Maula Jatt	Bilal Lashari	Fawad Khan, Hamza Ali Abbasi, Mahira Khan, Humaima Malik, Babar Ali, Resham	cult/action film	Released on October 13, 2022
Joyland	Saim Sadiq	Alina Khan, Rasti Farooq, Ali Junejo, Sarwat Gilani	Drama/Narrative	Released: May 23, 2022 (Cannes) November 18, 2022 (Pakistan)

== 2023 ==
Title	Director	Cast	Genre	Notes
Rang Ishqay Da	Pervaiz Kaleem	Iftikhar Thakur, Madiha Shah, Amna Rahi, Ali Abbas Syed, Zariya Khan, Naghma Begum	Romance	

== 2026 ==
Title	Director	Cast	Genre	Notes
Bullah	Shoaib Khan	Shaan, Sara Loren, Saleem Sheikh, Naeema Butt, Adnan Butt, Ali Josh, Maham Mirza	Action	To be released on Eid al-Fitr

== See also ==
- List of Pakistani films
- List of Indian Punjabi films
- List of Urdu-language films
