= List of Pakistani films of 1973 =

A list of films produced in Pakistan in 1973 (see 1973 in film):

== 1973 ==
Title	Director	Cast	Genre	Notes
Aas	Ali Sufian Afaqi	Shabnam, Mohammad Ali, Qavi Khan, Nannha	Romance	A hit movie of 1973 with music by Nisar Bazmi and film song lyrics by Masroor Anwar
Anhoni	Iqbal Akhtar	Aaliya, Waheed Murad, Lehri,	Romance	Music by Lal Mohammad Iqbal.
Anmol				
Azmat				
Banarsi Thug	Iqbal Kashmiri	Munawar Zarif, Ilyas Kashmiri, Ejaz Durrani, Firdous, Sultan Rahi	Social	Composed by Bakhshi Wazeer Sahib.
Baharon Ki Manzil	S. Suleman	Sangeeta, Shahid, Talish	Romance	Music by Nashad
Daman Aur Chingari	Shabab Kiranwi	Mohammad Ali, Nadeem Baig, Aslam Pervaiz, Zeba Ali	Drama	A super-hit musical film of 1973. Music by M. Ashraf.
Ghairat Da Nishan				
Ziddi	Iqbal Kashmiri	Yousuf Khan, EJaz, Ilyas Kashmiri, Nannha, Munawar Zarif	Drama, Action	A super-hit Punjabi musical film with 'Nigar Award winner' music by Master Abdullah
Insan Aur Gadha				
Jaal	Iftikhar Khan	Nisho, Waheed Murad, Nannah, Husna	Action film	Music by Nazir Ali
Farz				
Khawab Aur Zindagi		Waheed Murad		
Khushia	Haidar Chodhary	Munawar Zarif, Habib, Sangeeta	Drama	Prime Minister Zulfikar Ali Bhutto and many other world leaders can be seen on silver screen.
Mulaqat		Nisho, Waheed Murad	Romance	
Naya Rasta	Zafar Shabab			
Rangeela Aur Munawar Zarif	Nazar Shabab	Rangeela, Munawar Zarif, Saiqa, Shaista Qaiser	Comedy	
Jeera Blade	Iftikhar Khan	Munawar Zarif, Aasia, Saiqa, Afzal Ahmed, Bahar	Social	The film won Nigar Award for best cinematography
Sarhad Ki Goud Mein				
Sehrey Ke Phool				
Tum Salamat Raho		Aasiya, Waheed Murad, Mohammad Ali		
Ik Madari				

== See also ==
- 1973 in Pakistan
