= List of Pakistani films of 1975 =

A list of films produced in Pakistan in 1975:

== 1975 ==
Title	Director	Cast	Genre	Notes
Shirin Farhad	Sharif Nayyar	Zeba Ali, Mohammad Ali, Nimmo, Talish	Romance, Drama	The film is a Silver Jubilee
Zeenat	S. Suleman	Shabnam, Nadeem, Shahid, Munawar Zarif, Talish	Drama	A Golden Jubilee film and won 5 Nigar Awards
Pehchan	Pervaiz Malik	Nadeem, Shabnam, Sabiha Khanam, Qavi Khan	Drama	
Sharif Badmash	Iqbal Kashmiri	Yousuf Khan, Aasia, Sultan Rahi, Mustafa Qureshi	Action	Music by Master Abdullah with one mega-hit film song by Noor Jehan
Mera Naam Hai Mohabbat	Shabab Keranvi	Babra Sharif, Ghulam Mohiuddin, Zarqa, Bahar Begum, Tamanna, Rehan	Romance	The film was also very successful in China
Wehshi Jatt	Hassan Askari	Sultan Rahi, Aasia, Iqbal Hassan, Ghazala, Afzal Ahmed, Ilyas Kashmiri	Action	Music by Safdar Hussain
Shararat	S. Suleman	Munawar Zarif, Ghulam Mohiuddin, Mumtaz, Nirala, Khalid Saleem Mota, Lehri	Comedy	It is based on English play Charley's Aunt
Sheeda Pastol	Sharif Ali	Munawar Zarif, Aasia, Saiqa, Afzal Ahmed, Aslam Pervaiz, Nayyar Sultana, Sultan Rahi	Social	
Jub Jub Phool Khile	Iqbal Akhtar	Zeba, Waheed Murad, Mohammad Ali, Nadeem, Mumtaz	Romance	This was a Golden Jubilee film of 1975 with one super-hit film song sung by Mehdi Hassan with music by M Ashraf.
Bin Badal Barsaat				
Sultana Daku				
Aik Gunnah Aur Sahi				
Roshni (film)				

== See also ==
- 1975 in Pakistan
