= Zamurrad =

Pakistani film actress (born 1946)

- زمرد
- Born: Zamurrad Sultana; Amritsar, British India
- Other names: Pakistani Kamini Kaushal; Sitara; Nazi; Choti Zamurrad
- Occupations: Actress; Dancer; Model
- Years active: 1957 – 2016
- Spouse: Shahid (div.)
- Children: 1

Zamurrad Sultana, also known as Zamurrad (Urdu; زمرد) is a Pakistani film actress. Active in Lollywood from 1957 to 2016, she appeared in over 233 Urdu, Punjabi, and Pashto films, predominantly in supporting and character roles. She was among Pakistan's most popular actresses from the 1960s to the 1980s.

She was also known for her exceptional dance skills, particularly in Punjabi cinema during the 1970s and 1980s, and was known for her popular item songs.

== Early life ==
Zamurrad Sultana was born in 1946 in Amritsar, British India.She was born into a musical family and received artistic training under the guidance of her parents from a young age.Before her film career, she worked as a tawaif in the Shahi Mohallah area of Lahore, later known as Heera Mandi. She received extensive training in classical dance and music from expert teachers, skills that later became a cornerstone of her film performances.

== Career ==
Zamurrad began her acting career in 1957 with the Urdu film Masoom. In 1958, she appeared in Urdu film Hasrat where she played the role of actor Yousaf Khan's sister. Initially, to distinguish herself from another actress with the same name, she was referred to as '"Choti Zamurrad" (Little Zamurrad), while the other was "Bari Zamurrad" (Big Zamurrad).

During her career, Zamurrad used two other screen names such as Sitara and Nazi. Shabab Kiranvi gave her the name Sitara for his film Gulbadan. She gained some recognition under this name for her dance performance to the song Bajai Yeh Kesi Been Liya Sukh Chaen Mera Chheen in the film Saheli (1960).

Then she worked in the Karachi-based film Hamein Bhi Jeene Do, director Butt Kasher cast her as a solo heroine and gave her the name "Nazi," publicizing her as Pakistani Kamini Kaushal.

She appeared in many famous films such as Gulfam (1961), Maa Baap (1967), Saiqa (1968), Naseeb Apna Apna (1970), and Ziddi (1973).

During the 1970s, Zamurrad was regarded as one of the most prominent and popular film actresses of Punjabi cinema in Pakistan. In 1983, she starred in the Urdu film Ek Dooje Ke Liye, which initiated a "second era" in her career. She became highly successful as an item song dancer in many Punjabi films during the 1980s. Her item songs were immensely popular in films like Sahibji, Moti Te Dogar, Namak Halal, Ghulami, and Akbar Khan.

Zamurrad appeared in over 150 films, with notable roles in Urdu films like Saheli (1960), Azra (1962), and Badnaam (1966), as well as Punjabi films such as Heer Ranjha (1970) and Ziddi (1973). She received acclaim for her portrayal of Marina a Jewish nomadic dancer in the historical film Al-Hilal (1966) and a negative role in the successful film Banarsi Thug (1973). She also performed popular item songs in Punjabi films during the 1980s. Her final film appearance was in Sajra Piyar in 2016.

== Personal life ==
Zamurrad was married to actor Shahid, but they later divorced. They have one daughter, Rabia Shahid.

== Filmography ==
=== Film ===
Year	Film	Language
1957	Masoom	Urdu
1958	Chhoomantar	Punjabi
1958	Hasrat	Urdu
1960	Saheli	Urdu
1961	Gul Bakavli	Urdu
1961	Gulfam	Urdu
1962	Azra	Urdu
1962	Chodhary	Punjabi
1962	Mera Kya Qasoor	Urdu
1965	Sartaj	Urdu
1965	Malangi	Punjabi
1966	Kon Kisi Ka	Urdu
1966	Badnaam	Urdu
1966	Payel Ki Jhankar	Urdu
1967	Maa Baap	Urdu
1968	Saiqa	Urdu
1968	5 Darya	Punjabi
1969	Tahadi Izzat Da Sawal A	Punjabi
1970	Naseeb Apna Apna	Urdu
1970	Heer Ranjha	Punjabi
1970	Chann Puttar	Punjabi
1971	Night Club	Urdu
1971	Ucha Naa Pyar Da	Punjabi
1971	Pehlvan Jee In London	Punjabi
1971	Tehzeeb	Urdu
1972	Zaildar	Punjabi
1972	Ishtehari Mulzim	Punjabi
1972	Sajjan Beparwah	Punjabi
1972	Umrao Jan Ada	Urdu
1973	Ziddi	Punjabi
1973	Banarsi Thug	Punjabi
1976	Licence	Punjabi
1983	Sahib Ji	Punjabi
1983	Raka	Punjabi
1983	Lawaris	Punjabi
1983	Rustam Te Khan	Punjabi
1983	Gumnam	Urdu
1984	Lazawal	Urdu
1985	Shehzad Gay	Pashto
1985	Jeenay Nahin Dun Gi	Urdu
1985	Palkon Ki Chhaon Mein	Urdu
1985	Ghulami	Punjabi
1985	Jagga	Punjabi
1985	Zamin Aasman	Urdu
1985	Wadera	Punjabi
1986	Qaidi	Punjabi
1986	Aakhri Jang	Punjabi
1987	Sangal	Punjabi
1987	Allah Rakha	Punjabi
1987	Nachay Nagin	Punjabi
1988	Roti	Punjabi
1992	Sher Jang	Punjabi
2016	Sajra Pyar	Punjabi
