= Heer Sial (1938 film) =

1938 film

Heer Syal
- Directed by: Kishan Dev Mehra
- Written by: F. D. Sharf
- Screenplay by: F. D. Sharf
- Story by: F. D. Sharf
- Based on: Heer Ranjha by Waris Shah
- Produced by: Indra Movitone
- Starring: Balo; Shamshad Begum; M. Ismail; Baby Noor Jehan; Eiden Bai; P. N. Bally; J. N. Dar Kashmiri; A. Rahman Kashmiri; R. P. Kapoor; Miss Haider Bandi
- Music by: Dhoomi Khan
- Release date: 1938
- Country: British India
- Language: Punjabi

Heer Syal is a pre-partition Punjabi film released in 1938. It is the second film directed by Kishan Dev Mehra, along with assistant director M. M. Billoo Mehra. It starred new actors Balo and M. Ismail, with Noor Jehan, Haider Bandi and Eiden Bai. It is based on Heer Ranjha - a tragic epic romance story from Punjab by Waris Shah.

== Cast ==
- Balo
- Shamshad Begum
- M. Ismail
- Baby Noor Jehan
- Eiden Bai
- P. N. Bally
- J. N. Dar Kashmiri
- A. Rahman Kashmiri
- R. P. Kapoor
- Haider Bandi

== Songs ==
#	Title	Singer
1	"Sohnay Desan Andar Des Punjab"	Baby Noor Jehan
2	"Sohnay Desan Andar Des Punjab II"	Shamshad Begum

== See also ==
- Heer (disambiguation)
- Heer Ranjha (1932 film)
- Heer Sial (1965 film)
- Heer (1955 film)
- Heer Ranjha (1970 film), a Punjabi film from Pakistan
- Heer Raanjha, a 1970 Hindi film from India
