= Shaista Qaiser =

Pakistani actress

Shaista Qasier
- Born: Shaista Qasier; 5 June 1950 (age 76); Karachi, Pakistan
- Education: University of Karachi
- Occupations: Actress; Model; Radio artist
- Years active: 1964 – 1986
- Spouse: Ghazanfar Ali (m. 1981)
- Children: 3

Shaista Qaiser is a Pakistani actress. She is known for her roles in dramas Sahab, Bibi Aur Ghulam, Intezaar Farmiye, Roshan Manzil and Akhri Chattan. She also acted in Urdu films Maa Tay Maa, Dil Ek Aaina, Neya Rasta, Jaal, Shehar Aur Saye and Kiran Aur Kali.

== Early life ==
Shaista was born in Karachi, Pakistan, and completed her education from University of Karachi. Shaista started working at Radio Pakistan at Karachi.

== Career ==
She joined PTV in 1964 when it was newly established. Shaista acted in many dramas on PTV and later appeared in films. She made her film debut in Maa Tay Maa (1970), which written by Saba Fazli and directed by Iqbal Akhtar, starring with Agha Sajjad, Subhani Ba Yunus and Santosh Russal. She also did modeling and appeared in commercials and advertisements. She later worked in the PTV drama Sahab, Bibi Aur Ghulam.

In 1972 she appeared in film Aakhri Hamla with Syed Kamal, Tamanna, Badar Munir and Qazi Wajid which was written by Habib-ur-Rehman and produced by Syed Kemal. Later she worked in film Dil Ek Aaina with Zeba, Qavi Khan, Sangeeta, Muhammad Ali and Shahid it was directed by Shabab Kiranvi and written by Ali Sufiyan Afaqi the film was a Silver Jubilee at the box office.

In 1973 she worked in film Neya Rasta along with Shabnam, Rangeela, Muhammad Ali and Allaudin it was directed by Zafar Shabab and written by Lubna Afaqi the film was a Silver Jubilee hit at the box office. Later she appeared in Jaal film along with Nisho, Husna and Nanha written by Riaz Arshad which was directed by Iftikhar Khan and produced by Waheed Murad the film was Silver Jubilee hit at the box office. Then she was cast by director Nazar Shabab in film Rangeela Aur Munawar Zarif with Aslam Pervaiz, Munawar Zarif and Asha Posley the film was written by Rasheed Javed and produced by Shabab Kiranvi the film was a Silver Jubilee hit at the box office.

The following year in 1974 director Zia Sarhadi cast her in film Shehar Aur Saye with Aftab Manghi the film received average reviews at the box office. Then she appeared in film Dhamaka along with Shabnam, Jawed Sheikh and Rahman it was directed by S.T. Zaidi. In 1975 she portrayed the role of Ghazala in drama Intezar Farmaiye along with Moin Akhter, Mr. Jaidi, Shakeel and Qazi Wajid which was written by Athar Shah Khan Jaidi. Later the following year in 1976 she appeared in drama Roshan Manzil with Talat Iqbal.

In 1981 she worked in film Kiran Aur Kali with Waheed Murad, Shabnam, Lehri, Roohi Bano and Muhammad Ali it was written by Yaqoob Jamil and directed by Zahid Shah the film was a Golden Jubilee hit at the box office. She won Nigar Award of Best Supporting Actress for her role in film Kiran Aur Kali.

In 1985 she worked in historical drama Akhri Chattan along with Shafi Muhammad Shah, Subhani Ba Yunus, Rizwan Wasti, Fareed Nawaz Baloch, Anwar Iqbal, Tahira Wasti, Jamshed Ansari and Salim Nasir it was based on the same name novel written by Naseem Hijazi the drama was written by Saleem Ahmed and produced by Qasim Jalali. She portrayed the role of Safia a princess who is suffering because of a war and wants to be back with her love ones.

== Personal life ==
Shaista married Ghazanfar Ali a film producer and has three children. She lives with her family in Clifton at Karachi.

== Filmography ==
=== Television ===
| Year | Title | Role | Network |
|---|---|---|---|
| 1971 | Sahab Bibi Aur Ghulam | Nadia | PTV |
| 1975 | Intezar Farmaiye | Ghazala | PTV |
| 1976 | Roshan Manzil | Seemi | PTV |
| 1981 | Tareekh-o-Tamseel | Shehzadi | PTV |
| 1985 | Akhri Chattan | Safia | PTV |

=== Film ===
| Year | Film | Language |
|---|---|---|
| 1970 | Maa Tay Maa | Gujarati |
| 1972 | Aakhri Hamla | Urdu |
| 1972 | Dil Ek Aaina | Urdu |
| 1973 | Neya Rasta | Urdu |
| 1973 | Jaal | Urdu |
| 1973 | Rangeela Aur Munawar Zarif | Urdu |
| 1974 | Shehar Aur Saye | Urdu |
| 1974 | Dhamaka | Urdu |
| 1981 | Kiran Aur Kali | Urdu |

== Awards and recognition ==
| Year | Award | Category | Result | Title | Ref. |
|---|---|---|---|---|---|
| 1981 | Nigar Award | Best Supporting Actress | Won | Kiran Aur Kali | |
