= Firdous Begum =

Pakistani film actress (1947–2020)

- Born: Parveen Begum; 4 August 1947; Lahore, British India
- Died: 16 December 2020 (aged 73); Lahore, Pakistan
- Occupation: Actress
- Years active: 1961–1991
- Notable work: Heer Ranjha (1970); Malangi (1965)
- Spouse: Ejaz Durrani
- Children: 3
- Awards: Won 4 Nigar Awards in 1969, 1970, 1971 and 1973

Firdous Begum (born Parveen Begum; 4 August 1947 – 16 December 2020), known mononymously as Firdous, was a Pakistani actress and she is best known for her role as Heer in the 1970 film Heer Ranjha.

== Early life ==
She was born as Parveen Begum in Lahore, British India on 4 August 1947.

== Career ==
In 1961, she made her debut in film Gul Bakavli. She appeared as a supporting actress with the film Fanoos in 1963, and later played the lead role in Malangi (1965). Her other prominent films include Khandaan, Lai Laag and Aurat.

She appeared in over 197 films, including 130 Punjabi, 20 Urdu and three Pushto films.

== Personal life ==
During her career, she met Akmal Khan, lead actor of Malangi, and later they married, however Akmal died in 1967. She then married Ejaz Durrani, her co-actor of Heer Ranjha. She had three children, including two sons and a daughter.

== Illness and death ==
Firdous Begum died of brain hemorrhage on 16 December 2020 at a hospital in Lahore. She was 73. She is survived by are two sons and a daughter.

== Filmography ==
=== Film ===
Year	Title	Role	Notes	Ref
1961	Gul Bakavli		Firdous's debut film	
1963	Fanoos			
1965	Heer Sial	Heer		
1965	Malangi		A popular film which established Firdous as a major actress	
1966	Jaag Utha Insan			
1970	Heer Ranjha	Heer	A huge box office success. Music was by Khwaja Khurshid Anwar, film songs lyrics were by Ahmad Rahi. The film won 5 Nigar Awards, including the 'Best Actress Award' for Firdous	
1973	Ziddi		Firdous also won 'Best Actress' Nigar Award for this film	
1986	Qaidi			
1991	Da Jungle Badshah			

== Awards and recognition ==
Year	Award	Title	Result	Category	Ref.
1969	Nigar Award	Chan Veer	Won	Special Award	
1970	Nigar Award	Heer Ranjha	Won	Best Actress	
1971	Nigar Award	Aansoo	Won	Special Award	
1973	Nigar Award	Ziddi	Won	Best Actress	
