= Najma Mehboob =

Pakistani film and TV actress

- نجمہ محبوب
- Born: 1949; Rawalpindi, Pakistan
- Died: 6 December 1983 (aged 33–34); Lahore, Pakistan
- Cause of death: Train accident
- Occupation: Actress
- Years active: 1969 – 1983
- Spouse: Muhammad Nisar Hussain (TV director)
- Children: 1

Najma Mehboob (1949 – 6 December 1983) was a Pakistani film and TV actress. She mostly played character and mother roles in dramas and films both in Urdu and Punjabi languages.

== Early life ==
Najma was born in 1949 in Rawalpindi, Pakistan. Initially, she worked in stage plays.

== Career ==
She first appeared on television in 1969 with the drama Haathi Daant telecast from Pakistan Television, Lahore. Afterward, she appeared in several individual television dramas and serials. She also acted in 82 films, the first of which was Geo Dhola (1969), while Nazak Rishtay (1987), her last film was released after her death.

== Personal life ==
Najma was married to TV producer Muhammad Nisar Hussain and had one child with him.

== Death ==
On 6 December 1983, she died at Lahore after being hit by a running train during the shooting for the Punjabi film Rickshaw Driver while she was trying to save a child.

== Filmography ==
=== Television series ===
| Year | Title | Role | Network |
|---|---|---|---|
| 1969 | Haathi Daant | Hina | PTV |
| 1980 | Chanan Tay Darya | Jugnu | PTV |
| 1981 | Dehleez | Salma | PTV |
| 1982 | Qarz | Bibi Ji | PTV |
| 1982 | Sarab | Rabia | PTV |
| 1982 | Badzeed | Nazma | PTV |
| 1982 | Sona Chandi | Frasat Ali Khan's mother | PTV |
| 1983 | Qasai Aur Mehngai | Zohra | PTV |
| 1983 | Shikayatain Hakayatain | Abida | PTV |

=== Film ===
| Year | Film | Language |
|---|---|---|
| 1969 | Geo Dhola | Punjabi |
| 1972 | Khalish | Urdu |
| 1973 | Farz | Urdu |
| 1973 | Khuda Tay Maa | Punjabi |
| 1973 | Be Imaan | Urdu |
| 1973 | Aas | Urdu |
| 1973 | Rangeela Aur Munawar Zarif | Urdu |
| 1973 | Mr. Budhu | Urdu |
| 1973 | Tera Gham Rahay Salamat | Urdu |
| 1974 | Aaina Aur Soorat | Urdu |
| 1974 | Namak Harram | Urdu |
| 1974 | Naukar Wohti Da | Punjabi |
| 1974 | Sacha Jhoota | Urdu |
| 1974 | Intezar | Urdu |
| 1974 | Neelaam | Urdu |
| 1974 | Bhool | Urdu |
| 1975 | Farz Aur Mamta | Urdu |
| 1975 | Paisa | Urdu |
| 1975 | Pyar Ka Mousam | Urdu |
| 1975 | Zeenat | Urdu |
| 1975 | Sultana Daku | Punjabi |
| 1975 | Guddi | Punjabi |
| 1975 | Jab Jab Phool Khile | Urdu |
| 1975 | Zeenat | Urdu |
| 1975 | Roshni | Urdu |
| 1975 | Anari | Urdu |
| 1975 | Shararat | Urdu |
| 1975 | Sheeda Pastol | Punjabi |
| 1976 | Aulad | Urdu |
| 1976 | Khoufnak | Punjabi |
| 1976 | Raja Jani | Urdu |
| 1976 | Insan Aur Farishta | Urdu |
| 1976 | Chitra Te Shera | Punjabi |
| 1976 | Andaata | Urdu |
| 1976 | Aaj Aur Kal | Urdu |
| 1976 | Jano Kapatti | Punjabi |
| 1976 | Daaman Ki Aag | Urdu |
| 1976 | Waqt | Urdu |
| 1976 | Sohni Mehinwal | Punjabi |
| 1976 | Dekha Jaye Ga | Urdu |
| 1976 | Akh Lari Bado Badi | Punjabi |
| 1976 | Nasheman | Urdu |
| 1976 | Thaggan day Thagg | Punjabi |
| 1976 | Kil Kil Mera Naa | Punjabi |
| 1977 | Tera Vi Jawab Nein | Punjabi |
| 1977 | Aamna Samna | Urdu |
| 1977 | Aashi | Urdu |
| 1977 | Dard | Urdu |
| 1977 | Jeenay Ki Rah | Urdu |
| 1977 | Khamosh | Punjabi |
| 1977 | Apnay Huay Paraey | Urdu |
| 1978 | Bohat Khoob | Urdu |
| 1978 | Insan Aur Sheitan | Urdu |
| 1978 | Intekhab | Urdu |
| 1978 | Mehman | Urdu |
| 1978 | Ghazi Ilamuddin Shaheed | Punjabi |
| 1978 | Khuda Aur Mohabbat | Urdu |
| 1978 | Awaz | Urdu |
| 1978 | Achhay Mian | Urdu |
| 1978 | Dushman Ki Talash | Punjabi / Pashto |
| 1978 | Qayamat | Urdu |
| 1979 | Takht Ya Takhta | Punjabi |
| 1979 | Har Fun Moula | Punjabi |
| 1980 | Ham Dono | Urdu |
| 1980 | Saima | Urdu |
| 1980 | Rishta | Urdu |
| 1980 | Chotay Nawab | Urdu |
| 1980 | Double Cross | Urdu |
| 1980 | Sheikh Chilli | Punjabi |
| 1981 | Saala Sahib | Punjabi |
| 1981 | Qurbani | Urdu |
| 1981 | Muftbar | Punjabi |
| 1981 | Faslay | Urdu |
| 1982 | Pasbaan | Urdu |
| 1982 | Charda Suraj | Punjabi |
| 1982 | Aahat | Urdu |
| 1983 | Sahib Jee | Punjabi |
| 1983 | Dillan day Souday | Punjabi |
| 1983 | Nazra | Punjabi |
| 1983 | Qudrat | Punjabi |
| 1983 | Murad Khan | Punjabi |
| 1983 | Rickshaw Driver | Punjabi |
| 1983 | Deevana Mastana | Punjabi |
| 1987 | Nazak Rishtay | Punjabi |

== Awards and nominations ==
| Year | Award | Category | Result | Title | Ref. |
|---|---|---|---|---|---|
| 1983 | PTV Award | Best Actress | Won | Shikayatain Hakayatain | |
