= Naseeb Apna Apna (1970 film) =

- Directed by: Qamar Zaidi
- Produced by: Waheed Murad
- Starring: Waheed Murad; Shabnam; Zamurrad; Nirala; Tamanna; Saqi; Zafar Masood
- Music by: Lal Mohammad Iqbal
- Release date: 3 April 1970
- Running time: approx. 3 hours
- Country: Pakistan
- Language: Urdu

Naseeb Apna Apna is a 1970 Pakistani Urdu black-and-white film directed by Qamar Zaidi and produced by Waheed Murad. The cast included Waheed Murad, Shabnam, Zamurrud, Tamanna, Nirala and Saqi. The movie became a musical blockbuster and was one of the biggest hits of Shabnam's early career.

== Cast ==
- Shabnam
- Waheed Murad
- Zamurrad
- Nirala
- Saqi
- Tamanna
- Zafar Masood
- Mohammad Yousuf
- S.M. Saleem

== Production ==
The film was produced by Waheed Murad, directed by Qamar Zaidi, and written by Iqbal Rizvi. M. Ayub did the camera work.

== Release ==
Naseeb Apna Apna was released on 3 April 1970 in Pakistani cinemas. The film completed 11 weeks on main cinemas and 32 weeks on other cinemas in Karachi and, thus, became a Silver Jubilee hit.

== Music ==
The music of the film was composed by Lal Mohammad Iqbal and the songs were written by Masroor Anwar. Playback singers are Ahmed Rushdi (he received the Best Playback Singer Nigar Award for this film), Mala, Runa Laila and Irene Perveen. A list of the songs for the film is as follows:

- Aye abr-e-karam... by Ahmed Rushdi
- Dil tum ko dey diya hai... by Ahmed Rushdi
- Hum se na bigar o larki!... by Ahmed Rushdi
- Ghum ko bhula kar... by Mala
- Mili gul ko khushboo... by Runa Laila
- Aaj nahi to kal is ghar mein... by Irene Perveen

== Awards ==
Ahmed Rushdi received Nigar Award in the Best Singer's category for the song Aye abr-e-karam for this film Naseeb Apna Apna.
