= Heer Sial (1965 film) =

1965 Pakistani film

- Directed by: Jafar Bokhari
- Screenplay by: Baba Alam Siahposh
- Produced by: Jafar Bokhari; Sajjad Malik
- Starring: Firdous; Akmal; Gulrez; Nasira; M. Ismail; Salma Mumtaz; Zahur Shah; Asif Jah; Sultan Rahi; M. D. Sheikh; Imdad Husain
- Music by: Bakhshi Wazir
- Production company: Bokhari Pictures
- Release date: September 3, 1965 (Pakistan)
- Country: Pakistan
- Language: Punjabi

Heer Sial (Punjabi: ہیر سیال), sometimes spelled Heer Siyal, is a 1965 Punjabi-language Pakistani film directed by Jafar Bokhari, starring Firdous (as Heer) and Akmal (as Ranjha) in title roles. Despite its good musical score, the film did not do well at the box office.

== Cast ==
- Firdous
- Akmal
- M. Ismail
- Gulrez
- Nasira
- Salma Mumtaz
- Zahur Shah
- Asif Jah
- Sultan Rahi
- M. D. Sheikh
- Imdad Husain

== Music and soundtrack ==
The music is composed by Bakhshi Wazir with playback singers, Mehdi Hassan, Naseem Begum, Masood Rana, Irene Parveen and Muzaffar. Tanvir Naqvi and Waris Ludhianvi wrote the film song lyrics.

- "Mauj-O-Takht Hazaray Da Chaudhry Si, Mannia Dannia Wich Sarkar Mian" (Qissa Heer Waris Shah) Sung by Mehdi Hassan
- "Chhamkan Naal Mein Lachkaan Paanwan, Kehan Meinun Heer Sial" Sung by Naseem Begum
- "Loko Aimay Nahin Jay Yaar Da Nazara Labhda" Sung by Masood Rana

== See also ==
- Heer Sial (1938 film)
- Heer Ranjha (1932 film)
- Heer (1955 film)
