= Naeem Hashmi =

Pakistani actor and poet (1914-1976)

- نعیم ہاشمی
- Born: 1914
- Died: April 27, 1976 (aged 61–62)
- Occupations: Pakistani film, television and stage actor, writer, poet, producer, and director
- Writing career
- Notable works: Shah-E-Madina, Yasreb Ke Waali (Naat for the film Noor-e-Islam, 1957)

Naeem Hashmi (1914 – 27 April 1976) was a Pakistani film, television and stage actor, writer, poet, producer, and director. He was known for his roles as a villain in the late 1940s and 1950s, but he later took character roles in over 100 films.

== Career ==
Naeem Hashmi made his film debut in British India with Chandani Chowk (1946). His first movie in Pakistan was Ilzam (1953). His na'ats, or lyrics and praises said for the Islamic prophet Muhammad, also earned him much fame. The peak of his professional career came when he wrote the na'at Shah-E-Madina, Yasreb Ke Waali sung by Saleem Raza and Zubaida Khanum for the Pakistani film Noor-e-Islam (1957). It became a run-away super-hit song in 1957, and still has cultural relevance to this day.

Many of his films, such as the banned Inqalab-e-Kashmir, addressed social and national Pakistani issues. Ziddi (1973), Sharif Badmash (1975), and Chitra Tay Shera (1976) were some of Naeem Hashmi's most successful films.

== Death and legacy ==
Naeem Hashmi died of diabetes-related complications on 27 April 1976.

Naeem Hashmi's eldest son, Khawar Naeem Hashmi, is a Pakistani journalist, who works with BOL TV as its bureau chief in Lahore, Pakistan. He served for 35 years in Jang Group of Newspapers, as a news reporter, and later as Bureau Chief of Geo News in Lahore.

== Filmography ==
=== In India ===
- Chandni Chowk (1946)

=== In Pakistan ===
- Ilzam (1953)
- Khatoon (1955)
- Chhoti Begum (1956)
- Nigar (1957)
- Noor-e-Islam (1957)
- Shama (1959)
- Jhoomer (1959)
- Ayaz (1960)
- Azmat-e-Islam (1965)
- Madar-e-Millat (1966)
- Diya Aur Toofan (1969 film)
- Behan Bhai (1968)
- Babul (1971)
- Nizam (1972)
- Ziddi (1973 film)
- Sharif Badmash (1975 film)
- Chitra Tay Shera (1976 film)

== See also ==
- List of Lollywood actors
