= Deebo Bhattacharya =

Pakistani and Bangladeshi musician

Deebo Bhattacharya দেবু ভট্টাচার্য دیبو بھٹاچاریہ

Background information
- Born: 1 August 1930; Bengal Presidency, British India
- Origin: Bangladesh
- Died: 1994 (aged 63–64)
- Genre: Film score
- Occupation: Music director
- Years active: 1956 – 1974

Deebo Bhattacharya (1 August 1930 – 1994), also known as Debu Bhattacherjee, was a Pakistani-Bangladeshi musician, painter and singer who worked in Lollywood movies during the 1960s and 1970s.

He was one of the well known composers in Bangladesh as well. He is known for composing the classic Urdu song "Bare bemurawat hein ye husn walay, kahein dil laganay ki koshish na karna" for the film Badnaam (1966). After 1971, he became a citizen of Bangladesh. He was awarded Ekushey Padak in 1976 by the Government of Bangladesh.

He earned the first ever Bangladesh National Film Award for Best Music Director for Choritrohin (1975) jointly with Lokman Hossain Fakir. He was conferred Ekushey Padak posthumously in 1997 for his lifetime contribution to Bengali music.

== Early life and career ==
Deebo was born into a Bengali family. He arrived in Pakistan from India in 1956 to work as an assistant to Indian music director Timir Baran who was going to compose music for the film Anokhi (1956 film). While Timir Baran moved back to India after composing for a few Pakistani films, Deebo remained in Pakistan and settled down in Karachi.

In 1957, his first film as a solo music director, Maska Polish, was released. The movie was a box office disappointment but the songs in Ahmed Rushdi's voice gained recognition for Deebo. The same fate befell his next two movies, Yeh Duniya (1960) and Lakhoun Fasane (1961).

With the release of Banjaran (1962), he rose to notoriety, and the song "Na jane kaisa safar hai mera", sung by Noor Jehan, became a hit. The other milestone of Deebo's career was the film Badnaam (1966). One of its songs, "Bare Bemurawat Hain Yei Husn Waale, Kahin Dil Lagane Ko Koshish Na Karna", vocalized by Suraiya Multanikar, is considered one of his most timeless tunes.

In 1968, he composed songs for producer Waheed Murad's film Sumandar including the theme song, Tera Mera Sathi Hai Lehrata Sumandar (singer- Ahmed Rushdi).

In the 1960s and 1970s, he composed music for several other films, including; Shararat (1963), Beti (1964), Taqdeer (1966), Meray Bachay Meri Ankhen (1967), Bahadur (1967), Jhuk Gaya Aasman (1970) and Tiger Gang (1974).

== Popular compositions ==
| Song title | Singer(s) | Lyrics | Movie |
|---|---|---|---|
| Na jane kaisa safar hai mera | Noor Jehan | Fayyaz Hashmi | Banjaran (1962) |
| Ae dil tujhe ab un se ye kaisi shikayat hai | Masood Rana | Masroor Anwar | Shararat (1963) |
| Bare bemurawat hein ye husn wale | Suraiya Multanikar | Masroor Anwar | Badnaam (1966) |
| Hum bhi musafir tum bhi musafir | Masood Rana | Masroor Anwar | Badnaam (1966) |
| Haseen bahar ye mousam | Ahmed Rushdi / Runa Laila | Sehba Akhtar | Mere Bachay Meri Ankhein (1967) |
| Tera mera sathi hai lehrata samandar | Ahmed Rushdi / Masood Rana & others | Sehba Akhtar | Samundar (1968) |
| Yon rooth no gori mujh se | Ahmed Rushdi | Sehba Akhtar | Samundar (1968) |
| Tanha thi aur hamesha se tanha hai zindgi | Mehdi Hassan | Sehba Akhtar | Jaltay Armaan Bhujtay Deep (unreleased) |
| Chaand Ki Saej Pe Taaron Se Saja Ke Sehra | Runa Laila | Sehba Akhtar | Jhuk Gaya Aasman (1970) |

== Discography ==
The following is a list of films Bhattacharya scored:

| Year | Film | Notes |
|---|---|---|
| 1957 | Maska Polish | |
| 1960 | Yeh Duniya | |
| 1961 | Lakhon Fasanay | |
| 1961 | Hum Ek Hain | |
| 1962 | Banjaran | |
| 1963 | Qatl Ke Baad | |
| 1963 | Shararat | |
| 1963 | Shikwa | |
| 1964 | Beti | |
| 1965 | Aarzoo | |
| 1966 | Badnaam | |
| 1966 | Taqdeer | |
| 1967 | Bahadur | |
| 1967 | Mere Bachche Meri Aankhen | |
| 1968 | Ek Hi Raasta | |
| 1968 | Samundar | |
| 1969 | Pyaar Ki Jeet | |
| 1970 | Baazi | jointly composed with Sohail Rana |
| 1970 | Chand Suraj | |
| 1970 | Honeymoon | |
| 1970 | Jhuk Gaya Aasmaan | |
| 1971 | Baazigar | |
| 1974 | Dilwale | |
| 1974 | Tiger Gang | |
| 1975 | Charitraheen | Winner : Bangladesh National Film Award for Best Music Direction |
| 1978 | Bodhu Biday | composed alongside Alauddin Ali |
| 1982 | Ashar Alo | |
| 1982 | My Love | |
| Unreleased | Jaltay Arman Bujhtay Deep | |

== Later life and death ==
Deebo moved to Bangladesh after the separation of East Pakistan in 1971. He died in 1994.

== Awards ==
- Ekushey Padak (1997)
- National Film Award (1976)
