= Sharif Badmash =

1975 film

- Directed by: Iqbal Kashmiri
- Screenplay by: Hazin Qadri
- Story by: Hazin Qadri
- Produced by: Choudhary Mohammad Ajmal; Asim Ilyas
- Starring: Mumtaz; Yousuf Khan; Aasia; Sultan Rahi; Munawar Zarif; Afzal Ahmed; Mustafa Qureshi; Asad Bukhari; Ilyas Kashmiri; Naeem Hashmi
- Cinematography: Saleem Butt
- Edited by: B. A. Bukhi; Shaukat Ali
- Music by: Master Abdullah
- Production companies: Movie Vision; Bari Studio
- Distributed by: Quality Pictures
- Release date: 11 July 1975 (Pakistan)
- Running time: 147 minutes
- Country: Pakistan
- Language: Punjabi

Sharif Badmash is a 1975 Pakistani Punjabi-language action musical drama film directed by Iqbal Kashmiri.

== Cast ==
- Mumtaz as Guddo
- Yousuf Khan as Bao Shareef
- Aasia as Balli
- Sultan Rahi as Nadir Badmash
- Munawar Zarif as Misri
- Ilyas Kashmiri as Jailor
- Afzal Ahmed as Jaggu
- Mustafa Qureshi as Manggu
- Asad Bukhari as Akku
- Shahida as Billo
- Seema as Bali's mother
- Atia Sharif as Masterji's daughter
- Naeem Hashmi as Masterji
- Farah Jalal
- Hamid
- Rangoon Wala
- Chohan
- Agha Dilraj
- Fazal Haq - Thekedar
- Jani - Chanti

== Soundtrack ==
Sharif Badmash

Soundtrack album by Master Abdullah
- Released: May 10, 1979
- Recorded: Famous Reordering
- Studio: Bari Studio
- Genre: Film soundtrack
- Length: 18:47
- Language: Punjabi
- Label: EMI Music
- Director: Iqbal Kashmiri
- Producer: Javed Ashraf; Singers; Noor Jehan; Shaukat Ali
- Compiler: Hazin Qadri

Master Abdullah chronology
Malangi (1965)	Sharif Badmash (1979)	Chitra Te Shera (1976)

All songs, except one were composed by Master Abdullah. The film song lyrics were composed by Hazin Qadri.

=== Track list ===
Music of film Sharif Badmash (Punjabi - 1979)
No.	Title	Lyrics	Music	Singer (s)	Length
1.	"Chandra Govand Na Hoye.."	Hazin Qadri	Master Abdullah	Noor Jehan	3:04
2.	"Mein Na Jamdi Dhola Ve.."	Hazin Qadri	Master Abdullah	Noor Jehan	5:39
3.	"Main Ve Jaanwan Dol, Aja Mere Kol.."	Hazin Qadri	Master Abdullah	Noor Jehan, Mehnaz	3:34
4.	"Dil Diyan Man Ke Chura Chanke.."	Hazin Qadri	Master Abdullah	Noor Jehan	4:42
5.	"Jogi Aya Dawaray Teray, Kann Wich Pa Kay Mundran.."	Hazin Qadri	Master Abdullah	Shaukat Ali	3:26
6.	"Adhi Adhi Raati Mera Sona Aya.."	Hazin Qadri	Master Abdullah	Noor Jehan	3:07
7.	"Meri Tor Kabutri Wargi, Te Dil Kare Gutku Gutku.."	Hazin Qadri	Master Abdullah	Noor Jehan	3:30
Total length:					27:33
