= Imam Din Gohavia =

1967 film

- historical movie original poster
- Directed by: M. Saleem; Mohsin Jamali
- Written by: Sikedar
- Screenplay by: Sikedar
- Story by: Chaudry Mohammad Aslam
- Based on: A true story from 1885 from the British Raj
- Produced by: Chaudhry Mohammed Aslam
- Starring: Akmal; Firdous Begum; Gulsan; Yousuf Khan; A. Khan; Ilyas Kashmiri; Sultan Rahi; Talish; Munawar Zarif; Nabeela; Rangeela; Meena Shorey; Mohammad Ali; Tani Begum
- Narrated by: Mian Khursid Aslam
- Cinematography: Rasheed Choudhry
- Edited by: Ali
- Music by: G.A. Chishti; Lyrics; Waris Ludhianvi, Manzoor Jhalla, Sikkedar
- Distributed by: Chaudhry Films
- Release date: 2 June 1967
- Running time: 150 minutes
- Country: Pakistan
- Language: Punjabi

Imam Din Gohavia (Punjabi: اِمام دین گوہاویا) is a 1967 Pakistani, biographical film in the Punjabi language about the British Raj, directed by M. Saleem and produced by Chaudhry Mohammad Aslam. It stars Akmal Khan, Yousuf Khan and Talish.

== Cast ==
- Akmal Khan as Imam Din Gohavia
- Firdous
- Gulsan
- Yousuf Khan
- A. Khan
- Tani Begum
- Asad Bokhari
- Meena Shorey
- Sikedar
- Ilyas Kashmiri
- Talish
- Mohammad Ali
- Amin Malik (Guest Appearance)
- Munawar Zarif as Shamaulu
- Saeed Khan Rangeela
- Zulfi
- Khalifa Nazir
- Chham Chham
- Sultan Rahi
- Ajmal
- Zeenat Begum
- Fazal Haq
- Farida
- Tahira
- Sheikh Iqbal
- Jaggi
- Shakeel
- Iqbal Hassan

== Soundtrack ==
G.A. Chishti composed the film music and Waris Ludhianvi, Manzoor Jhalla and Sikendar wrote the songs' lyrics.

=== Track listing ===
No.	Title	Artist(s)	Length
1.	"Sukhan Sukhdeyan Ae Din Aaya Te Menu Bara Cha Charya"	Naseem Begum	3:28
2.	"Koi Phul Phul Behnda Gore Rang Da Ghulam"	Nazir Begum, Irene Parveen	3:30
3.	"Lori Dewan Lal Nu Mein Sohnay Lal Nu"	Munawar Zarif, Muzaffar, Siddiq	2:52
4.	"Sayo Pameya De Pind Di Bahar"	Noor Jehan, Irene Parveen	4:20
5.	"Gal Sun Ke Main Phul Wangon Khil Gayi"	Noor Jehan	2:59
6.	"Nachiye Jao Kaleo Tusi Nachiye Ja"	Munawar Zarif, Muzaffar, Siddiq	2:35
7.	"Aai Shagna Dee Rut Mastani"	Noor Jehan	3:20
8.	"Neeli Chatri Waleya Rabba"	Noor Jehan	3:49
