= Billo (film) =

1951 film

Billo (1951 film)
- Directed by: Amjad Hussain
- Produced by: Aslam Hayat
- Starring: Darpan; M. Ismail; Nizam Din; Najma
- Music by: Ghulam Ahmed Chishti
- Release date: January 4, 1951
- Country: Pakistan
- Language: Punjabi

Billo (Punjabi: ਬਿੱਲੋ, Urdu: بلو) is a 1951 Punjabi, Pakistani film directed by Amjad Hussain and starring Darpan, M. Ismail, Nizam Din and Najma.

Ghulam Ahmed Chishti composed the music. Actor Darpan made his debut in this film as well.

== See also ==
- List of Pakistani Punjabi films
