= Suraiya Multanikar =

Pakistani singer (born 1940)

Surayya Multanikar
- ثُریّا مُلتانِیکر
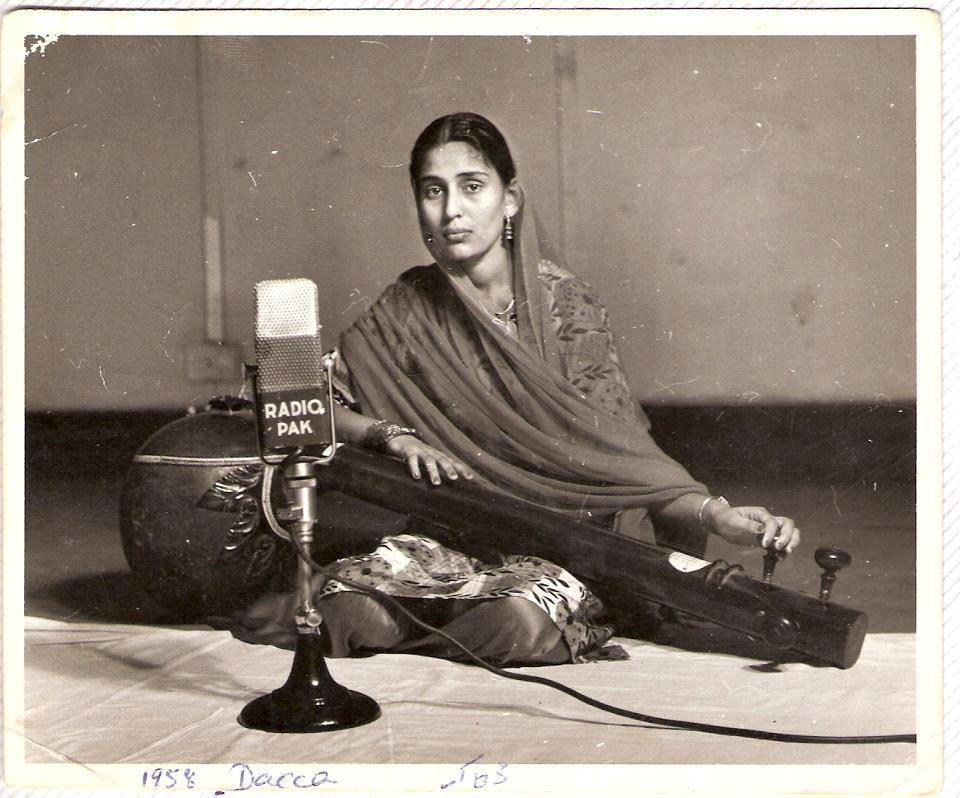
- Multanikar in Dhaka (1958)
- Born: 1940 (age 85–86); Multan, Punjab, British India
- Citizenship: Pakistani
- Occupations: Folk singer, playback singer, vocalist
- Years active: 1955–present
- Children: 7
- Awards: Pride of Performance Award by the President of Pakistan (1986); Sitara-i-Imtiaz (Star of Excellence) Award by the Government of Pakistan (2008)

Suraiya Multanikar (born 1940) is a Pakistani singer mostly known for her folk songs especially kafis. Her repertoire includes classical, semi-classical, ghazal, folk songs, kafis and film songs.

== Early life and family ==
Multanikar was born in Multan, Punjab. Her earliest childhood memories are of wanting to excel as a singer. As no one in her immediate family could provide her vocal training or guidance, she taught herself by listening to film songs and copying their tunes and lyrics. Later, she became a formal disciple of Ghulam Nabi Khan of the Delhi gharana of classical music who was a sarangi player and a strict disciplinarian, popularly known as Fauji Khan.

Multanikar, at age 19, once performed at a gathering organized by former President of Pakistan Ayub Khan.

Multanikar has 7 children (from oldest to youngest): Muhammad Ali, a UK-based orthopaedic doctor; Ruqaiya Sajjad; Ramzan Ali, Shaista, Rabia, Aalia and Rahat Bano. Her youngest daughter, Rahat Multanikar is also a folk singer like her mother.

== Career ==
=== Radio Pakistan ===
On the radio, at age 15, she sang compositions by veteran Pakistani composers, Niaz Hussain Shami and Abdul Haq Qureshi. In her career as a singer, she was inspired from the works of Roshan Ara Begum, Ustad Salamat Ali Khan of Sham Chaurasia gharana, Bade Fateh Ali Khan of Patiala gharana and Mehdi Hassan.

=== Film industry ===
Multanikar's career as a playback singer was short lived. She gained widespread recognition for her song,"Bare Be Murawwat Hain Yeh Husn Walay", "Kahin Dil Laganey Ki Koshish Na Karna" written by Masroor Anwar, music by Deebo Bhattacharya from the Pakistani film, Badnaam (1966).

== Awards and recognition ==
- 1959: Golden Award
- 1960: Chatta Gaang Award
- 1975: Gulam Fareed Award
- 1980: Gulam Fareed Award
- 1982: Jashn-e-Fareed Award
- 1981: Shair-e-Mashriq Award
- 1982: Shair-e-Mashriq Award
- 1986: Pride of Performance Award by the President of Pakistan
- 2000: Shahbaz Award
- 2002: Gulam Fareed Award
- 2006: Lifetime achievement award by Radio Pakistan
- 2008: Sitara-i-Imtiaz Award by the President of Pakistan
