= Jaal (1973 film) =

- Directed by: Iftikhar Khan
- Produced by: Waheed Murad
- Starring: Waheed Murad; Nisho; Husna; Shaista Qaiser; Nanna
- Music by: Nazir Ali
- Distributed by: Film Arts
- Release date: 31 August 1973
- Running time: 180 minutes
- Country: Pakistan
- Language: Urdu

Jaal, a 1973 Pakistani Urdu colour film, is a romantic musical film produced by Waheed Murad and directed by Iftikhar Khan. It was the first colour movie that was produced by Waheed Murad. The film was released on 31 August 1973. It starred Waheed Murad, Nisho, Husna, Shaista Qaiser and Nanna. It was the second film of Waheed Murad with Nisho, first being Mulaqat (1973) (released during the same year).

== Cast ==
- Nisho
- Waheed Murad
- Shaista Qaiser
- Husna
- Nazim
- Nanha
- Saqi
- Changezi
- S.M. Saleem
- Laddan
- Rashid

== Release ==
Jaal was released by Film Arts on 31 August 1973 on Karachi and Lahore cinemas. The film ran 13 weeks in main cinemas and 39 weeks on other cinemas in Karachi, and proved to be an 'average hit' film of the year. The film completed its consecutive 25 weeks on cinemas and attained the status of a 'Silver Jubilee film'.

== Music ==
The music of the film was directed by Nazir Ali. Songs were written by Khawaja Pervez. The songs especially Dil ki dharkan madham madham... became very popular sung by Ahmed Rushdi and Runa Laila:

- Dil ki dharkan madham madham... by Ahmed Rushdi and Runa Laila
- Bun jati meri qismat... by Ahmed Rushdi
- Main ne duniya se... by Ahmed Rushdi
- O meri pyari behna... by Ahmed Rushdi
- Angara mera mun... by Ahmed Rushdi
