= Master Abdullah =

Pakistani film composer (1930 - 1994)

- ماسٹر عبدُاللہ
- Born: Sadiq Ali; 1930; Mazang Kanakmandi, Lahore, Punjab, British India
- Died: 31 January 1994 (aged 63–64); Sheikh Zaid Hospital, Lahore, Pakistan
- Other name: Master Abdullah
- Occupation: Film score composer
- Awards: Won Nigar Award in 1973

Master Abdullah (Punjabi, Urdu: ماسٹر عبدُاللہ), (1930 – 31 January 1994) was a Pakistani film music composer. He is known for his music in movies like "Badla" (1968), "Commander" (1968), "Ziddi" (1973), and "Sheeshay Ka Ghar" (1978).

== Early life and family ==
He was born Sadiq Ali in 1930 in Lahore. His elder brother Master Inayat Hussain (1923–1993) was a film music composer in the early days of Pakistan film industry and was better known in Pakistan than Master Abdullah himself.

== Career ==
Master Abdullah began his film career in 1962 with the Urdu film Suraj Mukhi (1962).

== Major Films of Master Abdullah ==
- Malangi (1965)
- Laado (1966)
- Badla (1968)
- Commander (1968)
- Rangu Jatt (1970)
- Ziddi (1973) (won for this film Best Film Music Director Nigar Award in 1973)
- Shehanshah (1974)
- Sharif Badmash (1975)
- Sheeshay Ka Ghar (1978)
- Jatt Mirza (1982)
- Qismet (1985)

== Compositions ==
Songs composed by Master Abdullah include:

- Mahi way saano bhul na jaaven, Singer: Noor Jehan, Movie: Malangi (1965)
- Phhikki pay gayi chan tarian di lou, Singer: Noor Jehan, Movie: Badla (1968)
- Jan-e-man itna bata do mohabbat hai kiya, Singer: Runa Laila, Movie: Commander (1968)
- Chal chaliay duniya di os nukray, Singer: Noor Jehan / Mehdi Hassan, Movie: Duniya Paise Di (1971)
- Mera dilbar mera dildar ton en, Singer: Tassawar Khanum, Movie: Jaagde Rehna (1972)
- Way chadd meri veni no maroor, Singer: Noor Jehan, Movie: Ziddi (1973)
- Tere naal naal vay main rena, Singer: Noor Jehan, Movie: Ziddi (1973)
- Ye safar tere mere piyar ka, Singer: Mehdi Hassan / Mehnaz, Movie: Sheeshay Ka Ghar (1978)

== Awards ==
Master Abdullah won a Best Musician Nigar Award for the Punjabi film Ziddi in 1973.
