= Choorian (1963 film) =

1963 Pakistani film

- Directed by: Amin Malik
- Written by: Baba Alam Siahposh
- Produced by: Rashid Dar
- Starring: Laila; Akmal Khan; Nasira; Razia; Asif Jah; Ajmal; A. Shah Shikarpuri, Mazhar Shah; Rangeela; Fazal Haq; Saqi; Gulrez; Mehboob Kashmiri; Zarrin Panna
- Music by: Tufail Farooqi; Film dialogue and film songs Lyricist: Baba Alam Siahposh
- Release date: May 17, 1963 (Lahore)
- Country: Pakistan
- Language: Punjabi

Choorian is a 1963 black and white Pakistani Punjabi language super-hit musical film.

It was the first Pakistani film to be given the "only for adults" rating by the censors. The film, when seen from today's standards, would seem quite "clean" to most audiences. But at the time, wearing body-baring dresses was taboo in Pakistan.

Actress Nasira, then famous Pakistani actress, wore dresses that showed more skin than was permissible at that time.

== Cast ==
- Laila
- Akmal Khan
- Nasira
- Razia
- Asif Jah
- M. Ajmal
- A. Shah Shikarpuri
- Mazhar Shah
- Rangeela
- Fazal Haq
- Saqi
- Gulrez
- Mehboob Kashmiri
- Zarrin Panna

== Film's music and super-hit film songs ==
This film had music by music director Tufail Farooqi, film song lyrics by Baba Alam Siahposh

Song	Singers
"Dinghi Pagh Bannhda Ae Munda Numberdar Da"	Noor Jehan
"Wey Gall Sunn Haania, Wey Dil Diya Jaania"	Noor Jehan
