= Zeenat (1975 film) =

1975 film

- Directed by: S. Suleman
- Written by: Agha Hassan Imtesal
- Produced by: Ahmed Shamsi; Rauf Shamsi
- Starring: Shabnam; Nadeem Baig; Shahid; Munawwar Zarif; Agha Talish; Najma; Najma Mehboob; Tamanna
- Music by: Nashad
- Release date: 30 May 1975
- Running time: approx. 3 hours
- Country: Pakistan
- Language: Urdu

Zeenat is a 1975 Pakistani film directed by S. Suleman. Shabnam played the title role in the film opposite Nadeem and Shahid.

It revolves around the sufferings of a baby girl and her journey to womanhood, until she is accepted by her grandfather, who hated her throughout his life. The Mehdi Hassan's ghazal featured in the film, "Rafta Rafta Wo Meri Hasti Ka Samaa Hogaye" became hugely popular and he eventually went on to win a Nigar Award for it as a playback singer.

The film was a golden jubilee hit at the box office. At 19th Nigar Awards, it won five Nigar Awards.

== Plot ==
Nawab Hashmat wants a male heir from his son Waqar and daughter-in law-Nargis due to the threats of division of property later on in life. However, when a girl, Zeenat is born the Nawab orders to have her killed. However on Waqar's and Nargis's begging, he leaves her on the condition she is to be raised with her servants away from her parents and the main house. Owing to maternal mortality, Zeenat's mother dies and her father is also killed in an accident, leaving her newly born brother Shaukat behind.

As Shaukat gets older, he does little except going out to clubs and wasting his grandfather's money on bad hobbies and habits. He transfers all the property on to his name by deception because his grandfather (the Nawab) refused to, due to his nature and bad habits. On the other hand, Zeenat marries Khurram, son of Nawab's hakim. Khurram goes abroad soon after his marriage and his mother throws Zeenat out of the house. She goes to her grandfather's house where the Nawab realises his mistake as the male heir he wanted at the time, now treats him badly. He eventually disowns Shaukat which brings him on to the right path. Khurram returns from abroad and yells at his mother for her bad deeds. He goes and brings Zeenat back home with proper rukhsati ceremony from her grandfather's house.

== Cast ==
- Shabnam in dual role as Nargis/ Zeenat
- Nadeem Baig as Waqar
- Shahid as Khurram
- Munawwar Zarif as Shaukat
- Agha Talish as Nawab
- Najma
- Najma Mehboob
- Tamanna

== Awards ==
Zeenat received 5 Nigar Awards in the following categories:

Category	Awardee
Best actress	Shabnam
Best supporting actor	Agha Talish
Best comedian	Munawwar Zarif
Best male playback singer	Mehdi Hassan
Best sound	A.Z. Baig
