= Roshni (film) =

Pakistani film

- روشنی
- Directed by: Qavi
- Written by: Iqbal Rizvi
- Based on: Housefull by Jameel Bismil
- Produced by: Qavi
- Starring: Nadeem; Mumtaz; Nisho; Sabiha Khanum; Qavi; Adeeb; Lehri; Najma Mehboob; Badar Munir
- Release date: 14 November 1975
- Country: Pakistan
- Language: Urdu

Roshni is a 1975 Pakistani film directed and produced by Muhammad Qavi Khan, and was the only film that he ever directed. The lead cast includes Nadeem, Nisho, Mumtaz, Sabiha Khanum and Lehri. The music was composed by Kamal Ahmed. Released on 14 November 1975, the film had an average box-office showing. The film was based on Jameel Bismil's TV play Housefull.

== Plot ==
Roni used to live a joyful life full of clubs and parties, but gets disturbs when Hanif, her former lover blackmails her by her photos. She accidentally comes across Jahangir, an educated and unemployed guy from a lower town who treats with the bullies who tease the people of his town. She visits her town along with him and feels calm there due to the simplicity of the life, that exists there. She attracts towards him too, and offers him a job in her father's office which he accepts.

Tired of her disturbed life and Hanif's blackmailing, she starts to commit suicide but Jahangir stops her by reaching there on the spot. She gives her strength to live and brings her back to life. She considers her sympathy as a love.

After a few days, she visits his town and is surprised to know about his marriage with Noor Jehan, Jahangir's neighbour and beloved one whom he loves forever. But the marriage comes to a halt, when Noor Jehan is kidnapped by the bullies, who become Jahangir's rival when he restrains them. They takes Noor Jehan to the city, where they intend to sell her to Hanif, Roni's blackmiler. Jahangir beats away them and brings Noor Jehan back with the help of his friend. Hanif is killed there by Roni and she herself killed by his bullet. Jahangir and Noor Jehan comes back and marries.

== Cast ==
- Nadeem
- Mumtaz
- Nisho
- Sabiha Khanum
- Lehri
- Qavi
- Adeeb
- Nasira
- Najma Mehboob
- Badar Munir
- Hanif

== Music and Soundtrack ==
The music of the film was composed by Kamal Ahmed, and lyrics were penned by Taslim Fazli and Riaz ur Rehman Saghar.

- Chhaap Tilak Sab Chheeni performed by Mehnaz
- Honay Laga Hai Pyar performed by Mehnaz
- Kuch Bolo Na, Bolo Na performed by Mehnaz
- Jan-e-Man, Dildar-e-Man performed by Mala
- Bari Khala Ko Salam performed by Naheed Akhtar and chorus
- Chal Mere Do Paiyyon Ke Ghoray Chal performed by Ahmed Rushdie

== Release and reception ==
Roshni was released on 14 November 1975. It failed to make a mark on the box office and ended up being an average grosser.

The film received mixed reviews, with The Statesman said it as a "mediocre film", and faulted it for the bad direction and poor characterisation.
