= Malangi (film) =

Pakistani film

Malangi (1965 film)
- Malangi Movie original poster
- Directed by: Rashid Akhtar; Mohsin Jamali (Guests); Rashid Abid; Arshad Multani
- Written by: Chaudhry Mohammad Aslam
- Screenplay by: Sikedar
- Story by: Chaudhry Mohammad Aslam
- Based on: Actual Historical Events (1924 British Raj)
- Produced by: Chaudhry Mohammed Aslam
- Starring: Akmal; Yousuf Khan; Shirin; Firdous; Mazhar Shah; Sawan; Talish; Munawar Zarif; Rangeela; Mohammad Ali; Aslam Pervaiz; Ajmal
- Narrated by: Mian Rasheed Aslam
- Cinematography: Mehmood A. Qazi; Moulvi Ghulam Mohammad
- Edited by: Ali, Buki
- Music by: Master Abdullah; Lyrics; Hazin Qadri, Master Abdullah; Singers; Noor Jehan, Masood Rana
- Distributed by: Chaudhry Films (Pvt.) Ltd
- Release date: 17 December 1965 (Pakistan)
- Running time: 160 minutes
- Country: Pakistan
- Language: Punjabi

Malangi (Punjabi: ملنگی) is a 1965 Pakistani biographical and musical film directed by Rashid Akhtar and produced by Chaudhry Mohammad Aslam. The cast included Akmal, Shirin, Yousuf Khan and Talish. This was a 'Golden Jubilee' film of 1965 and had super-hit film songs by the music director Master Abdullah.

== Cast ==
- Akmal as (Malangi), the film's title role
- Yousuf Khan
- Shirin
- Firdous
- Mazhar Shah as (Harnama)
- Sawan
- Fazal Haq
- M. Ajmal
- Sheikh Iqbal
- Talish
- Zeenat Begum
- Sikkedar
- Aslam Pervaiz (Guest appearance)
- Amin Malik (Guest appearance)
- Mohammad Ali (Guest appearance)
- Chham Chham
- Zumurrud
- Rangeela
- Gulshan
- Munawar Zarif
- Zulfi
- Khalifa Nazir
- Chun Chun
- Kamala Chaudhry
- Gotam
- A Khan
- Abu Shah
- Zia

== Soundtrack ==
"Malangi"
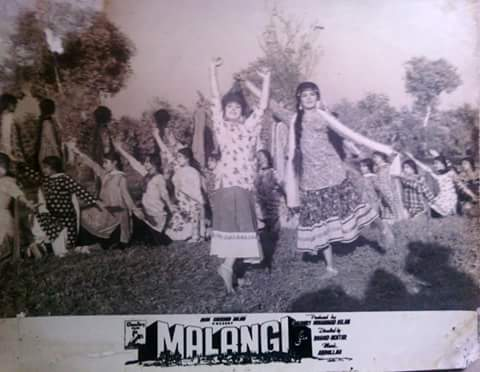
- Single picture sleeve

Single by Master Abdullah
- Released: December 1, 1974
- Recorded: 1974
- Studio: Bari Studio - Pakistan
- Genre: Film soundtrack
- Length: 3:01
- Label: Shalimar Records
- Songwriter: Hazin Qadri
- Producer: Chaudhry Mohammad Aslam

Master Abdullah singles chronology
"Heer Ranjha" (1979)	"Malangi" (1974)	"Imam Din Gohavia" (1976)

The music of the film is by famous musician Master Abdullah. The lyrics are penned by Hazin Qadri. Madam Noor Jehan and musician Master Abdullah became the demand of the box office after three mega hit musical films in the same year the others being Imam Din Gohavia

The score and soundtrack for Malangi were composed by Master Abdullah. Rashid Akhtar had worked on eight films with Master Abdullah and developed a rapport with him. The lyrics were by Hazin Qadri. The soundtrack consists of 8 songs and features vocals by:

- Noor Jehan
- Mala
- Nazir Begum
- Irene Perveen
- Masood Rana
- Munawar Zarif
- Master Abdullah

=== Track listing ===
No.	Title	Artist(s)	Length
1.	"Khana De Khan Parohney"	Masood Rana	3:28
2.	"Balle Balle Bhaee Lokan Paahney Phull Uddia"	Nazir Begum & Irene Parveen	3:30
3.	"Chad Kurriye Khayal"	Nazir Begum & Irene Parveen	2:52
4.	"Mahi We Sanu Bhul Na Jaaween "	Noor Jehan	4:20
5.	"Uth Majhe Dya Sher Jawaanan"	Masood Rana	2:59
6.	"Channa Wey Charrh Kothay Tey Udeekan, Tey Aaja Tu"	Mala	2:35
7.	"Suno Merey Sajno Tey Nalay Mitro, Hanion Tey Bailio"	Munawar Zarif & Master Abdullah	3:20
8.	"Chad Challi Babla, Terian Mein Galian"	Mala	3:49
