= Badnaam (film) =

- بدنام
- Directed by: Iqbal Shehzad
- Screenplay by: Riaz Shahid
- Based on: Jhumkay by Saadat Hassan Manto
- Produced by: Iqbal Shehzad
- Starring: Allauddin; Nabeela; Neelo; Ejaz Durrani; Diljeet Mirza; Hameed Wain; Tani Begum; Rangeela
- Cinematography: M. Sadiq
- Music by: Deebo Bhattacharya
- Distributed by: Montana Films
- Release date: 2 September 1966
- Country: Pakistan
- Language: Urdu

Badnaam is a Pakistani film in Urdu language, released on 2 September 1966, adapted from Saadat Hasan Manto's short story Jhumkay ("Ear-rings") by screenwriter Riaz Shahid, and was the second film adaptation of the Manto's story after 1946 Bollywood adaptation. The film was directed and produced by Iqbal Shehzad, in his debut as a film director. Badnaam's cast included Allauddin, Nabeela, Neelo, Ejaz Durrani, Diljeet Mirza, Hameed Wain, Rangeela and Zamurrad.

The film celebrated its Silver Jubilee at the Pakistani cinemas in 1966 and was a box-office hit. The song of the film "Bare Bemurawat Hain Yei Husn Waale" was enormously popular, composed by Deebo Bhattacharya and is of the most prominent song of the singer Suraiya Multanikar. Badnaam received critical acclaim for its script and received three awards at Nigar Awards with a special award for Allauddin. It was also entered in the 5th Moscow International Film Festival.

== Plot ==
The film's plot revolves around a poor housewife who desires to get a pair of earrings but her poor husband cannot afford it for her. One day, she buys them but pays a heavy price for it.

== Cast ==
- Allauddin
- Nabeela
- Neelo
- Ejaz Durrani
- Diljeet Mirza
- Tani Begum
- Hameed Wain
- Rangeela
- Zamurrad

== Music ==
Music was composed by Deebo also known as Deebo Bhattacharya, film song lyrics were by Masroor Anwar, Tanvir Naqvi and Himayat Ali Shair.

- " Baday Be-Murrawwat Hain Yeh Husn Waalay, Kahin Dil Lagaanay Ki Koshish Na Karna"

Sung by playback singer, Suraiya Multanikar. This mujra song was performed in the film by actress Zamurrad.
This run-away mega-hit film's "mujra" song was mainly responsible for the film's box-office success and became of the best known song of the singer. The tune of the song was also used by Indian music duo Nadeem-Shravan.

- "Abhi Tau Dil Mein Halki Si Khalish Mahsoos Hoti Hai, Bahut Mumkin Hai Kal Iss Ka Mohabbat Naam Ho Jaaey"

Sung by Masood Rana

- "Bohat Beabroo Ho Kr Tere Kuche Se Hum Nikle"

Sung by Masood Rana, Shaukat Ali, Salamat Ali, Imdad Hussain & co

- "Hum Bhi Musafir, Tum Bhi Musafir Kon Kisi Ka Howay"

Sung by Masood Rana

- "Aa Tujh Ko Sunaun Lori, Halat Se Chori Chori"

Sung by Naheed Niazi

== Release and response ==
Badnaam was released on 2 September 1966. The film ran for 35 weeks in Karachi cinemas and was a silver jubilee hit.

== Reception and legacy ==
Badnaam is considered as an important film from the Golden Age of Pakistani cinema, that depicts the realism and presents intellectual stimulation. An author described it as, one of the best story-based films ever made in West Pakistan.

Contemporary critics also praised the film due to its various aspects of filmmaking, with Daily Times included it among the list of unforgettable and daring films of the Pakistani cinema. Muhammad Suhayb of Dawn praised the film's story, music and performances.

== Awards and nominations ==
Nigar Awards

- Special Nigar Award - Allaudin
- Nigar Award for Best Supporting Actress - Nabeela
- Nigar Award for Best Scriptwriter - Riaz Shahid (based on a short story by Saadat Hasan Manto)
