= Chitra Te Shera =

1976 film

Chitra Te Shera چِترا تے شیرا
- Punjabi: چِترا تے شیرا
- Directed by: Iqbal Kashmiri; Hassan Zubeiri
- Written by: Aziz Merathi; Dialogue; Rasheed Sajid; Iqbal Kashmiri
- Produced by: Babar Iqbal
- Starring: Yousuf Khan; Sultan Rahi; Aasia; Shahnaz; Afzaal Ahmad; Najma Mehboob; Adeeb; Nayyar Sultana; Ilyas Kashmiri; Naeem Hashmi; Sheikh Iqbal; Ali Ejaz; Kemal Irani; Munawar Zarif
- Narrated by: Waqar Bhai
- Cinematography: Saleem Butt
- Edited by: Saleem Ahmed Rasheed; Khalid Pervez
- Music by: Master Inayat Hussain
- Production companies: Green Art Studio; Evernew Studio
- Distributed by: Quality Pictures
- Release date: July 16, 1976
- Running time: 136 minutes
- Country: Pakistan
- Language: Punjabi

Chitra Te Shera (Punjabi: چترا تے شیرا) is a 1976 Pakistani Punjabi-language historical fiction film, directed by Iqbal Kashmiri and Hassan Zubeiri. The film stars Shahnaz in the lead role, with Yousuf Khan, Aasia, Sultan Rahi, and Ilyas Kashmiri.

== Cast ==
- Shahnaz – Reshma
- Yousuf Khan – Shera
- Asiya – Amina
- Sultan Rahi – Chitra Daku
- Munawar Zarif – Boota Singh
- Nayyar Sultana – Malika Jazbbat
- Adeeb – Farangi
- Afzaal Ahmad – Farangi
- Ilyas Kashmiri – Farangi
- Waheeda Khan
- Kamal Irani
- Sheikh Iqbal – Lala Tarmdas
- Naeem Hashmi
- Atia Sharf
- Sultan Iqbal
- Rehana Babari
- Hamid Hussan
- Ali Ejaz (Guest)
- Najma (Guest appearance)
- Jaggi
- Shah Nawaz
- Najma Mehboob

== Track list ==
All tracks are written by Rasheed Sajid & Aziz Merathi & Iqbal Kashmiri.

Chitra Te Shera Track listing
No.	Title	Lyrics	Music	Singer(s)	Length
1.	"Aya Mahi Aya, Akoin Mera Sonha Ay.."	Hazeen Qadri & Khawaja Pervez	Master Inayat Hussain	Noor Jehan	3:37
2.	"Nachan Gi Mein Nachan Gi O Zalma Nachan Gi.."	Hazeen Qadri & Khawaja Pervez	Master Inayat Hussain	Noor Jehan	4:30
3.	"Assan Maan Watan Da Rakhna A, Sir Lathna A, Dhar Nachna A."	Hazeen Qadri & Khawaja Pervez	Master Inayat Hussain	Masood Rana	4:21
4.	"Paveen Kuj Kahveen, Manda Nahi Bolna.."	Hazeen Qadri & Khawaja Pervez	Master Inayat Hussain	Noor Jehan	3:25
5.	"Dukh Dil Da Ruj Ke Bolia Naye."	Hazeen Qadri & Khawaja Pervez	Master Inayat Hussain	Mehdi Hassan	3:28
6.	"Aaey Wailey Nehray Nehray Beann Dey.."	Hazeen Qadri & Khawaja Pervez	Master Inayat Hussain	Noor Jehan	3:17
7.	"Sir Chukday Nahi Kadai Zulama Agay (Reprise).."	Hazeen Qadri & Khawaja Pervez	Master Inayat Hussain	Masood Rana	2:34
Total length:					25:12
