= Akmal Khan =

Pakistani actor (1929 - 1967)

Akmal
- Born: Mohammad Asif Khan; 11 November 1929; Lahore, Pakistan
- Died: 11 June 1967 (aged 37); Lahore, Pakistan
- Occupation: Actor
- Years active: 1955 – 1967
- Spouse: Malka Begum
- Children: Shehbaz Akmal (son) and 6 daughters
- Relatives: M. Ajmal Khan (older brother who was also an actor)

Akmal Khan, or Akmal, (11 November 1929 – 11 June 1967) was a Pakistani film actor.

== Early life and career ==
Akmal Khan's birth name was Mohammad Asif Khan and he was born in 1929 in Lahore, British India. Akmal Khan (his professional name) first became a film make-up artist and was then introduced as an actor by the Pakistani film producer-director Anwar Kamal Pasha in his film Qatil (1955). In 1956, he appeared as a lead actor in the Punjabi language film Jabroo (1956). This was a hit film and gave Akmal his breakthrough in the Pakistani film industry.

== Death ==
Tombstone of Akmal's grave

Akmal died due to cardiac arrest on 11 June 1967. He is buried in Muslim Town Graveyard, Lahore.

== Selected filmography ==
Title	Released	Language
Qatil	1955	Urdu
Jabroo	1956	Punjabi
Dulla Bhatti	1956	Punjabi
Palkaan	1957	Punjabi
Bodi Shah	1959	Punjabi
Bacha Jamoora	1959	Punjabi
Rani Khan	1960	Punjabi
Muftbar	1961	Punjabi
Choorian	1963	Punjabi
Malangi	1965	Punjabi
Heer Sial	1965	Punjabi
Doli	1965	Punjabi
Imam Din Gohavia	1967	Punjabi
