= Tamanna Begum =

Pakistani actress (1944 - 2012)

- تمنا بیگم
- Born: Safia Begum; 1944; Aligarh, Uttar Pradesh, British India
- Died: 20 February 2012 (aged 67–68); Karachi, Sindh, Pakistan
- Occupations: Actress; Radio Artist; Radio Presenter
- Years active: 1960–2012
- Children: 1
- Awards: Nigar Awards (1977)

Tamanna Begum (1944 – 20 February 2012) was a Pakistani film and television actress.

== Early life ==
Tamanna Begum was born in 1944 at Aligarh, Uttar Pradesh in British India.

== Career ==
Tamanna Begum started her media career as a presenter at Radio Pakistan in Lahore in 1960 and later performed in theater plays before moving into the film industry. She debuted in films with Daaman in 1962. She won the Nigar Awards for Best Supporting Actress for her role in Bharosa in 1977. Over her career, she appeared in more than 263 films, often in negative roles, but also in some comedic ones.

In 1964, soon after the launch of PTV earlier in the year, she worked in PTV's first-ever play, Nazrana, co-starring with Kanwal Naseer, Qavi Khan and Khursheed Shahid. The drama was written by Najma Farooqi. After decades in film, she transitioned to television and worked in hundreds of TV drama serials, appearing in various character roles in Pakistani TV dramas.

== Personal life ==
Tamanna Begum was married and she had one daughter.

== Illness and death ==
Tamanna Begum died after a long illness in Karachi on 20 February 2012. She had a heart attack which led to kidney failure, and she was receiving treatment in a private hospital, including dialysis twice a week. Despite the treatment, she did not recover and died. At the time of her death, reports varied about her age: Samaa TV claimed she was 64, Dawn reported 68 and The Express Tribune stated 75.

== Filmography ==
=== Film ===
Tamanna Begum did a total of 263 films. Some of her popular films are:

Year	Title	Language	Ref.
1963	Daaman	Urdu	
1964	Ashiana	Urdu	
1970	Najma	Urdu	
1970	Naseeb Apna Apna	Urdu	
1970	Parai Beti	Urdu	
1971	Afshan	Urdu	
1971	Khamosh Nigahen	Urdu	
1971	Ilzaam	Urdu	
1971	Nadaan	Urdu	
1972	Sajjan Beparwah	Punjabi	
1972	Mohabbat	Urdu	
1972	Pazeb	Urdu	
1972	Umrao Jaan Ada	Urdu	
1973	Anmol	Urdu	
1974	Shama	Urdu	
1975	Zeenat	Urdu	
1976	Nasheman	Urdu	
1977	Bharosa	Urdu	
1978	Juvand Ya Marg	Pashto	
1978	Nazrana	Urdu	
1979	Behan Bhai	Urdu	
1979	Neya Andaz	Urdu	
1979	Waaday Ki Zanjeer	Urdu	
1980	Zamir	Urdu	
1980	Sohra Te Jawai	Punjabi	
1981	Bara Aadmi	Urdu	
1982	Ek Din Bahu Ka	Urdu	
1983	Deevangi	Urdu	
1984	Muqaddar Ka Sikandar	Urdu	
1989	Shaani	Urdu	
1996	Mehndi	Urdu	
1997	Sangam	Urdu	
1998	Dupatta Jal Raha Hay	Urdu	
1999	Dunya Say Kya Darna	Urdu	

=== Television ===
Year	Title	Role	Network
1964	Nazrana	Begum Sahiba	PTV
1982	Alif Noon	Amma	PTV
1982	Sona Chandi	Ruqaya	PTV
1988	Mirat-ul-Uroos	Nani	PTV
1988	Bakht Nama	Grandmother	PTV
1994	Saat Bhiraie	Dai	PTV
1995	Dukh Sukh	Masi	PTV
1995	Uraan	Bibi Ji	PTV
1995	Kallo	Zulfiqar's mother	PTV
1995	Red Card	Salika	STN
1995	Maigh Malhar	Professor Chaudhry's Sister	PTV
1997	Zahar Baad	Sarfaraz's mother	STN
1998	Jeet	Bua	PTV
1999	Is Ghar Ke Andar	Dadi	PTV
2002	Faaslay	Meeru's aunt	PTV
2002	Chaandni Raatain	Bubbo	PTV
2003	Mehndi	Janna Bi	PTV
2004	Moorat	Kinza's mother	Geo Entertainment
2005	Chahatain	Aunty	PTV
2009	Veena	Munna's mother	ARY Digital
2010	Halaat	Afzal's mother	ARY Digital
2011	Mere Sanwariya Ka Naam	Munni's mother	ARY Digital
2011	Khandan e Shughlia	Moinuddin's mother	ARY Digital
2011	Masab Ki Dillagi	Amma	ARY Digital
2012	Juhi Jenny Javeria	Aneesa Begum	ATV
2012	Dil Dard Dhuan	Khala	ARY Digital
2012	Vanee	Dadi	Geo TV

=== Telefilm ===
Year	Title	Role
2011	Ahsaas	Amma

== Awards and recognition ==
Year	Award	Category	Result	Title	Ref.
1977	Nigar Awards	Best Supporting Actress	Won	Bharosa	
