= Heer Ranjha (1970 film) =

1970 Pakistani film

- DVD cover
- Directed by: Masood Parvez
- Screenplay by: Ahmad Rahi
- Based on: Heer Ranjha by Waris Shah
- Produced by: Ejaz Durrani; Masood Parvez
- Starring: M. Ajmal; Ejaz Durrani; Firdous; Najmul Hassan; Tani Begum; Zamurrad; Munawar Zarif; Salma Mumtaz; Rehana
- Cinematography: Masood-ur-Rehman; Munawar Ayub
- Edited by: Zamir Qamir
- Music by: Khawaja Khurshid Anwar
- Production companies: Evernew Studio; Sany Colour Laboratory Karachi
- Distributed by: Punjab Pictures
- Release date: 19 June 1970
- Running time: 2:17:25
- Country: Pakistan
- Language: Punjabi

Heer Ranjha (Punjabi/Urdu: ہیر رانجھا) is a 1970 Pakistani Punjabi film, based on the classic epic folk tragedy of Heer Ranjha, whose most famous rendition was by the Sufi poet Waris Shah.

The film is ranked among the critics and users' poll of "Top Ten Pakistani films" conducted by British Film Institute.

== Plot ==
The film revolves around Heer (Firdous), a girl born into a wealthy rural family, and Ranjha (Ejaz Durrani) the youngest of four brothers and his deceased father's favorite son, whose journey from his own village takes him to the village where Heer lives after the wives of his brothers refuse him food and mock him.

He meets and falls in love with Heer after she offers him work tending to her family's cattle. However her jealous uncle Kaido has other plans and will stop at nothing to prevent the two from being together. When Heer is subsequently forced by her father to marry another man, Saida Khera, she broken-heartedly enters a shrine. Ranjha, reciting the name of "Allah", eventually finds her and they are reunited. Their happiness does not last long, as Ranjha is arrested by the local ruler, although he is soon freed and permitted to marry Heer.

On their wedding day, however, Heer's jealous uncle Kaido poisons her. Ranjha, after hearing the calls of Heer's soul screaming his name, comes to realize that her uncle Kaido has killed her. Ranjha kills Kaido with the latter's walking stick and then collapses and dies, to be together with Heer in the afterlife.

== Cast ==
- M. Ajmal as Kaido
- Ejaz Durrani as Ranjha (played the lead role and was the film producer also)
- Firdous as Heer
- Najmul Hassan
- Zamurrad
- Tani Begum
- Munawar Zarif as Saida Khera
- Rehana
- Salma Mumtaz
- Rangeela
- Seema

== Songs (album) ==
All lyrics are written by Ahmad Rahi; all music is composed by Khawaja Khurshid Anwar

Heer Ranjha album - track listing
No.	Title	Singer(s)	Length
1.	"Awwal Hamd Khuda Da Wird Kariye."	Noor Jehan, Ghulam Ali	4:30
2.	"Main Chham Chham Nachan, Main Chham Chham Gawan.."	Noor Jehan, Naseem Begum	3:41
3.	"Sun Wanjli Di Mithri Taan Way.."	Noor Jehan	4:23
4.	"O Wanjli Walarya, Tu Taan Moh Leyi O Mutiyaar.."	Noor Jehan, Munir Hussain	3:29
5.	"Chann Mahia Teri Rah Peyi Takni Aan.."	Noor Jehan	3:29
6.	"Doli Charhdian Marian Heer Cheekan.."	Noor Jehan	1:07
7.	"Teri Khair Hovay, Doli Charh Jan Waliye.."	Munir Hussain	3:17
8.	"Rabba Wekh Leya Tera Main Jahan.."	Masood Rana	3:37
9.	"Kaddi Aa Mil Ranjhan Way, Teinu Dil Da Haal Sunawan.."	Noor Jehan	3:55
10.	"Adhi Raat Jad Log Aram Karday (Heer Waris Shah).."	Ghulam Ali, Naseem Begum	2:59
11.	"Tu Chor Main Teri Chori, Balocha Hania.."	Irene Parveen	3:19
12.	"Zulfan Di Thandi Thandi Chhan, Dholna.."	Noor Jehan, Irene Parveen	4:04
13.	"Wichhray Meet Mila Day, Rabba.."	Mujeeb Aalam and others	3:17
Total length:			45:01

== Awards ==
- Nigar Award for Best Punjabi-language Film (1970)
- Nigar Award for Best Director (Punjabi-language films) (1970)
- Nigar Award for Best Music Director (Punjabi-language films) (1970)
- Special Nigar Award to supporting actor M. Ajmal (1970)
