= Irene Perveen =

Film playback singer

Irene Parveen
- Genres: Film playback singing
- Occupation: Singer
- Instrument: Vocalist
- Years active: 1958 – 1972

Irene Perveen also spelled as Irene Parveen is a Pakistani playback singer from the 1960s, who mainly sang for Pakistani films. She gained popularity for her film song, "Tumhi ho mehboob mere" for Shabab Kiranvi's Aaina (1966).

== Career ==
In the beginning, Irene used to sing in Radio Pakistan's music programs. She started her career in the film Noor-e-Islam in 1957. She sang some popular duets with Masood Rana and Ahmed Rushdi. She later sang many hit songs for 31 films including the super-hit song Tumhi Ho Mehboob Meray in Kiranvi's Aaina, with lyrics by Khawaja Pervez and music by M. Ashraf. In the 1960s, she was the most suitable female singer to sing comedy or parody songs, and sang many comedy songs with Ahmad Rushdi and Masood Rana.

== Personal life ==
Irene married Cecil Samuel, from a prominent Peshawari family. She has lived in England since 1983.

== Popular songs ==
Irene sang around 800 Urdu and Punjabi film songs. Some of her popular songs are:

- Tumhi ho Mehoob mere (Film: Aaina, 1966)
- Dil na lagana ja ke Des paraye (Film: Insaniyat, 1967)
- Rutt Sawan ki re, Mann bhaawan ki (Film: Zamin, 1965)
- Kaan mein Jhumka dhole (Film: Badnaam, 1966)
- Ik aur baat mani (Film: Badnaam, 1966)
- Maan bhi jao Guriya Rani (Film: Hamrahi, 1966)
- Nikke hundiya da pyar (Film: Mirza Jatt, 1967)
- Arre re re re re re main chali (Film: Katari, 1968)
- Hello Hello Mr. Abdul Ghani (Film: Behan Bhai, 1968)
- Shareer kahein ke (Film: Daastan, 1969)
- Kis qadar hai etmad (Film: Azmat, 1970)
- Aaj nahin to kall is Ghar mein Chand si Bhabhi aye gi (Film: Naseeb Apna Apna, 1970)
- Ke Ke Ke Tumi Bolona (Film: Dheu Er Por Dheu, 1970) [Bengali]
- Tumi Bolte Paro Ki (Film: Swaralipi, 1970) [Bengali]
