= Ziddi (1973 film) =

Pakistani film

- Directed by: Iqbal Kashmiri
- Written by: Hazin Qadri
- Produced by: Chodhary Mohammad Ajmal; Moazzam Ilyas
- Starring: Yousuf Khan; Firdous; Ejaz; Nabeela; Tani Begum; Ilyas Kashmiri; Munawar Zarif; Nannha; Mumtaz
- Cinematography: Nabi Ahmad
- Edited by: Hazin Qadri
- Music by: Master Abdullah
- Production company: Bari Studios
- Distributed by: Quality Films
- Release date: 16 January 1973
- Running time: 170 minutes
- Country: Pakistan
- Language: Punjabi

Ziddi (1973) is a Pakistani (Urdu: ضدى) Punjabi language film released on January 16, 1973. The cast included Yousuf Khan, Nabeela and Firdous. It is considered a hit movie of 1973 that won 6 Nigar Awards.

== Cast ==
- Yousuf Khan
- Firdous
- Ejaz
- Zumurrad
- Munawar Zarif as Shaadi
- Nannha
- Khalifa Nazir
- Naeem Hashmi
- Hamid Hussain
- Rozina
- Mumtaz
- Nabeela
- Ilyas Kashmiri
- Rangeela
- Changezi
- Tani Begum

== Super-hit songs of this film ==
- "Teray Naal Naal Wey Mein Rehna" sung by Noor Jehan
- "Sohnia Mein Teray Jee Sadaqay, Hore Mein Aakhaan Kee Sadaqay" sung by Noor Jehan
- "Wey Chhadd Meri Weeni Na Marore" sung by Noor Jehan
- "Akhhian Wey Raateen Saun Na Deindian" sung by Noor Jehan

The songs' lyrics were written by Saifuddin Saif, Hazeen Qadri and Waris Ludhianvi, and music was composed by Master Abdullah.

== Awards ==
Won 6 Nigar Awards for Best Film, Best Director, Best Script, Best Actor, Best Actress and Best Music in the Punjabi-language films category.
