= Yousuf Khan (actor) =

Pakistani film actor (1930–2004)

- یوسف خان
- Born: Khan Mohammad Yousuf Khan; 1933; Ferozepur, Punjab, British India (now Punjab, India)
- Died: 19 September 2009 (aged 75–76); Lahore, Pakistan
- Occupation: Actor
- Years active: 1954–2004
- Awards: Pride of Performance Award by the President of Pakistan in 2004; Nigar Award in film Ziddi (1973)

Yousuf Khan (Urdu: یوسف خان; 1933 – 19 September 2009) was one of Pakistan's most respected actors.

He appeared in more than four hundred films in Urdu, Punjabi and Pashto languages over his 46 year long career. Among his important movies were Ziddi (1973), which turned him into a leading actor, and But Shikan (1994), both recipients of Nigar Awards. His 1974 Punjabi film Khatarnak became one of the first Punjabi films to achieve Diamond Jubilee status, running for over 100 weeks in both Lahore and Karachi. He played leading roles till his last active years in the industry, including in Budha Gujjar (2002).

== Early life and education ==
According to family sources, Yousuf Khan was born in 1933 in Ferozepur, British India (now Punjab, India). Following the Partition of India in 1947, his family migrated to Pakistan and settled in Kasur, Punjab, Pakistan. His father, Khan Nawaz Khan, was a barrister by profession. Khan received his early education at Islamia High School, Bhatti Gate, Lahore. During his studies one of his classmates would be future filmmaker Riaz Shahid, the father of actor-director Shaan.

Khan was an pigeon enthusiast who brought his pigeons with him during the 1947 migration. His pigeons remained a lifelong hobby, as well as a part of his public image.

== Career ==
Yousuf Khan first appeared on film sets as a spectator during a shoot in Lahore’s Bagh-e-Jinnah; he made his debut in the film Parwaaz in 1954. He started his film career as a supporting actor, but later matured into a lead actor, especially with Ziddi (1973). He started his film career when the Pakistani film industry was ruled by big name actors like Sudhir, Santosh Kumar, Darpan and Aslam Pervaiz. He made a name for himself first as a romantic hero in Urdu language films. Later on, in the late 1970s till the mid-1990s, he became known as an action hero in Punjabi and Pashto language films.

== Death ==
Yousuf Khan died on 19 September 2009 at age 76 at Lahore, Pakistan of cardiac arrest. He was buried in his adopted hometown Kasur, Punjab, Pakistan.

== Awards and recognition ==
- Nigar Award for Best Actor in Punjabi language film Ziddi
- Pride of Performance Award in 2004 by the President of Pakistan

== Selected filmography ==
- Parwaaz (1954) (his debut film)
- Hasrat (1958)
- Nagin (1959)
- Laggan (1960)
- Do Raste (1961)
- Susral (1962)
- Khamosh Raho (1964)
- Malangi (1965)
- Maa Baap (1966)
- Imam Din Gohavia (1967)
- Taj Mahal (1968)
- Dil-i-Betaab (1969)
- Babul (1971)
- Gharnata (1971)
- Khoon Da Darya (1973)
- Ziddi (1973)
- Jawab Do (1974)
- Seedha Raasta (1974)
- Khatarnak (1974)
- Khooni (1975)
- Sharif Badmash (1975)
- Chitra Te Shera (1976)
- Phool aur Sholay (1976)
- Warrant (1976)
- Yaar da Sehra (1976)
- Yarana (1976)
- Takrao (1978)
- General Bakht Khan (1979)
- Dushman Dar (1981)
- Rustam Tey Khan (1983)
- Wadda Khan (1984)
- Ghulami (1985)
- Joora (1986)
- Disco Dancer (1987)
- Khuda Gawah (1993)
- Umar Mukhtar (1997)
- Allah Rakha
- Bau Ji
- Bharosa
- Chann Puttar
- Chann Veer
- Chhanga Tay Manga
- Dushman Mera Yaar
- Japani Guddi
- Khan -E- Azam
- Khatarnak
- Nagin
- Qissa Khawani
- Sher Maidaan Da
- Shera
- Sohni Mahiwal
- Tere Ishq Nachaya
- Buddha Gujjar (2002)
- Arrain Da Kharak

== See also ==
- List of Lollywood actors
