= Munawar Zarif =

Pakistani comedian and actor

- منور ظریف
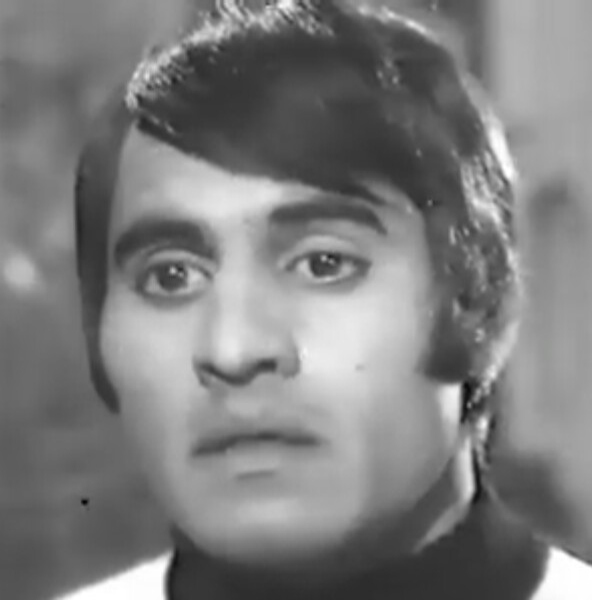
- Munawar Zarif in 1973
- Born: Muhammad Munawar; 2 February 1940; Gujranwala, Punjab, British India (now in Punjab, Pakistan)
- Died: 29 April 1976 (aged 36); Lahore, Punjab, Pakistan
- Resting place: Bibi Pak Daman Cemetery, Lahore, Pakistan
- Other name: Shahenshah-e-Zarafat (Urdu: شہنشاہِ ﻇﺮﺍﻓﺖ)
- Occupations: Actor; comedian
- Years active: 1961 – 1976
- Known for: A versatile comedian
- Works: Performances
- Spouse: Bilquis Khanum
- Children: 3, including Faisal Munawar Zarif who also died in 2019
- Relatives: Mohammad Zarif (brother); Munir Zarif (eldest brother); Rasheed Zarif (brother); Majeed Zarif (brother)
- Awards: Won 3 Nigar Awards during his career

Munawar Zarif (Punjabi, Urdu: منور ظریف; 2 February 1940 – 29 April 1976) was a Pakistani film actor and comedian. His fans named him Shahenshah-e-Zarafat (Urdu: شہنشاہِ ﻇﺮﺍﻓﺖ), meaning the King of Humor.

He was one of the most popular and highest paid actors of the 1970s and is considered one of the greatest comedians of South Asia.

== Early life and career ==
Munawar Zarif was born on 2 February 1940 in Gujranwala, Punjab. He started his film career with the Punjabi film Dandian (1961). His breakthrough film was 1964's Hath Jori. After starting as a comedian, he was promoted to playing second leads starting with the film Parday Mein Rehnay Do (1973). Subsequently, he was cast as the lead actor in films such as Banarsi Thug (1973) and Jeera Blade (1973). Possibly his most popular role was in 1974's Naukar Wohti Da, which became a runaway hit.

He received his first Nigar Award in "Special Award" category for his performance in Ishaq Deewana (1971). He won the Nigar Award in the "Best Comedian" category for Baharo Phool Barsao (1972) and Zeenat (1975 film). He appeared in more than 300 films from 1961 to 1976. He was well-known for his Ad-Lib dialogue delivery.

== Personal life ==
Munawar Zarif was the younger brother of comedian Mohammad Zarif (1926-1960), famous in the 1950s for being the first comedian in Pakistan's cinema to play lead roles, while his other brothers Rasheed Zarif (1946-1974) and Majeed Zarif (1942-2012) were also comedians in movies. Eldest brother was Munir Zarif (1934 - 2014), a film and TV actor famous for his roles in serials like Sona Chandi, Aalif Laila and Ainak Wala Jin, who died in 2014 at age 75.

He was lifelong friend of fellow comedian Ali Ejaz.

Munawar Zarif got married through a traditional arranged marriage within his extended family. His only son Faisal Munawar Zarif debuted as an actor with Puttar Munawar Zareef Da in 1994, followed by other movies like Puttar Jeeray Blade Da (1996) and Khotay Sikay (1998), but he couldn't find success in the film industry, so he moved to England before relocating to Morocco after marrying a Moroccan woman, where he died in 2019 of cardiac arrest at the age of 44.

== Death ==
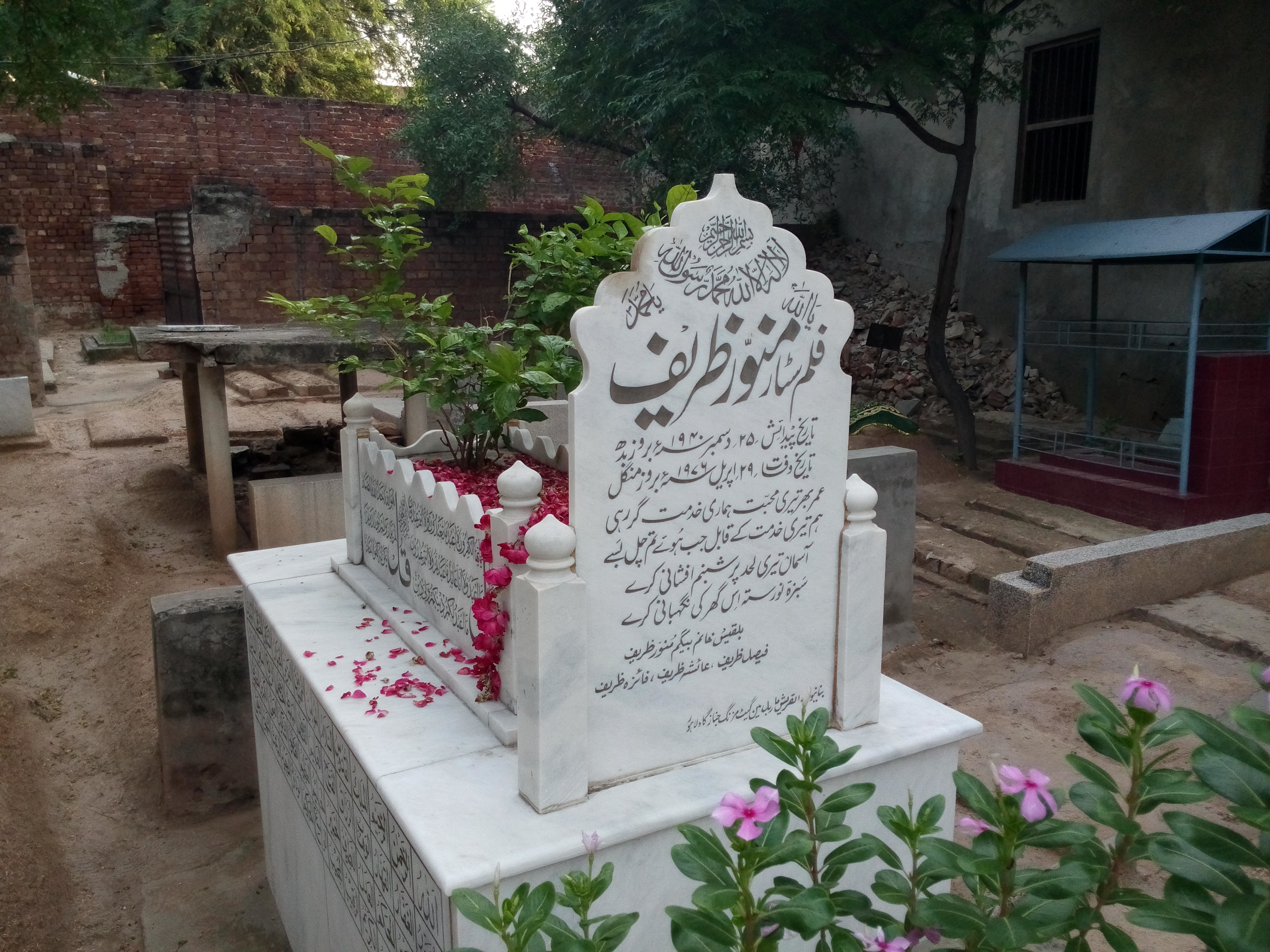
Zarif's grave at Bibi Pak Daman graveyard Lahore

Zarif's family announced his death in Pakistan, on 29 April 1976 at the age of 36. He died in Lahore due to cirrhosis of the liver and a sudden heart attack. He was laid to rest at Bibi Pak Daman Cemetery, Lahore.

== Legacy ==
Munawar Zarif is often regarded as one of the greatest comedians ever in Pakistani films. Fellow comedian and friend Ali Ejaz recalled his ability to improvise lines on the spot and called him an 'extempore' comedian.

Radio Pakistan Multan programme manager Asif Khan Khaitran reminisced about the success of Munawar Zarif and said: "There was a time in his career when writers would develop script with Munawar Zarif's personality in mind."

According to a major English-language newspaper of Pakistan, other noted Pakistani comedians Umer Shareef, Moin Akhter and Sohail Ahmed copied his spontaneous and well-timed style before they became famous.

Comedian Umer Shareef called him the "Mount Everest" of comedy and said that "for attaining fame in the field of comedy one must follow Munawar Zarif’s school of thought."

== Filmography ==
=== 1960s ===
Year	Title	Role	Notes
1961	Dandiyan		
1964	Haath Jori	Beeru	
1965	Malangi		
1966	Bharia Mela		
1967	Imam Din Gohavia	Shamaulu	
1968	Bau Jee		
1968	Shahansha-e-Jahangir		
1968	Taj Mahal		
1969	Diya Aur Toofan	Abdullah	

=== 1970s ===
Year	Title	Role	Notes
1970	Heer Ranjha	Saida Khera	
1970	Rangeela	Josheela	
1971	Dil Aur Duniya	Parwana	
1971	Khamosh Nigahen	Munawar	
1971	Ishq Deevana	Maqbool "Qoola" Ahmed	Special Nigar Award
1972	Baharo Phool Barsao	Mirza	Nigar Award for Best Comedian
1973	Ziddi	Shaadi	
1973	Parday Mein Rehnay Do	Qurban	
1973	Ajj Da Mehinwal	Izzat "Izzy" Baig	
1973	Banarsi Thug	Sheeda	
1973	Khushia	Khushi	
1973	Rangeela Aur Munawar Zarif	Munawar Zarif / Khan Bahadur Ishtiaq Ali	
1973	Jeera Blade	Shafqat / Jeera Blade	
1974	Manji Kithay Dahwan	Rahmat	
1974	Naukar Wohti Da	Bhola / Munawar	
1974	Namak Haram	Jamal / Jameel	Double role
1974	Chakkarbaz	Iqbal "Baala" Hassan	
Hasday Aao Hasday Jao	Mhanna		
1975	Pyar Ka Mousam	Munawar	
1975	Zeenat	Shaukat	Nigar Award for Best Comedian
1975	Sharif Badmash	Misrri	
1975	Shararat	Sherwani	
1975	Sheeda Pastol	Sheeda Pastol / Jeeda	Double role
1975	Shoukan Melay Di	Bahadar	
1976	Hukam Da Ghulam	Jani	
1976	Jano Kapatti	Jano / Jani	
1976	Anjaam	Khaleel	
1976	Ustad Shagird	Jani	
1976	Chitra Tay Shera	Boota Singh	
1976	Badtameez	Afzal	
1976	Reshma Tay Shera	Jimmy	
1977	Naya Suraj		

== Awards and honours ==
Nigar Awards

- Nigar Awards 1971 - Special Award for Ishq Deevana
- Nigar Awards 1972 - Best Comedian for Baharo Phool Barsao
- Nigar Awards 1975 - Best Comedian for Zeenat (1975 film)

== See also ==
- List of Pakistani actors
