= List of Pakistani films of 1965 =

A list of films produced in Pakistan in the year 1965:

== 1965 ==
Title	Director	Cast	Notes
1965
Aakhri Station		Rani, Haroon, Shabnam, Subhash Dutta, Akbar	East Pakistan
Aisa Bhi Hota He	Fazal Karim Fazli	Zeba, Syed Kamal, Nirala, Saloni	Music by Nisar Bazmi
Arzoo		Hanif, Tarranum, Talat Siddiqui, Ibrahim Nafees	
Aurat		Rani, Habib, Firdous, Talish	
Azmat-e-Islam	Nazir and Naeem Hashmi	Sawarn Lata, Habib, Shamim, Chand	
Bahana	Zahir Raihan	Kabori, Rahman, Garaj Babu	East Pakistan
Bahu Begum		Sabira, Habib, Waheed Murad, Deeba	
Chhoti Si Duniya		Laila, Habib, Zeenat, Allauddin	
Chori Chhuppe		Rozina, Sethi, Mahmood Ali, Sharafat	
Devdas	Sarfraz	Shamim Ara, Habib, Nayyar Sultana, Talish	
Dil Ke Tukre		Shamim Ara, Deeba, Mohammad Ali, Habib	
Doctor		Bahar, Waheed Murad, Yasmeen, Jaffery	
Eid Mubarak	S. M. Yusuf	Zeba, Waheed Murad, Habib, Rukhsana	Music by A. Hamid
Faraib		Neelo, Habib, Deeba, Rangeela	
Fashion		Shamim Ara, Santosh Kumar, Habib	
Hazar Dastaan		Rani, Mohammad Ali, Nazar, Adeeb	
Hum Matwaley Naujawan		Deeba, Sultan, Naghma, Asad, Zeenat	
Ishq-e-Habib		Talat Siddiqi, Ibrahim Nafees, Tarranum	
Kaise Kahun		Shabnam, Khalil, Subhash Dutta, Mustafa	East Pakistan
Kajal		Shabnam, Khalil, Subhash Dutta, Anwera	
Kalay Log		Bahar, Habib, Amy, Kafira, Anwer Majeed	
Kaneez	Hassan Tariq	Sabiha Khanum, Waheed Murad, Mohammad Ali, Santosh Kumar, Zeba	Music by Khalil Ahmed and Tassaduq
Khota Paisa		Saloni, Mohammad Ali, Aaliya, Aslam Pervaiz	
Koh Qaf		Laila, Darpan, Diljeet, Azad	
Mala		Sultana Zaman, Azim, Irfan, Akbar	East Pakistan
Mujahid		Mohammad Ali, Sabira, Sultana, Aslam Pervaiz, Deeba, Adeeb	Music by Khalil Ahmed
Naache Nagan Baje Been		Rani, Mohammad Ali, Firdaus, Rangeela	
Naila	Sharif Nayyar	Shamim Ara, Santosh Kumar, Darpan, Ragni	Music by Inayat Hussain
Raqasa		Neelo, Rukhsana, Talish, Yousuf	
Riwaaj		Zeba, Mohammad Ali, Yasmeen, Farida	
Saagar	Ehtesham	Shabnam, Azim, Tarana, Subhash Dutta, Inam	East Pakistan
Saaz-o-Awaz		Rani, Waheed Murad, Ragni, Rangeela	
Sanam		Bahar, Mohammad Ali, Rani, Kamal, Kumar	
Sartaj		Deeba, Kamaal, Aslam Pervaiz, Komal, Faizi	
Sat Rang	Fateh Lohani	Sultana Zaman, Haroon, Qazi Khaliq	East Pakistan
Shabnum		Rani, Kamal, Mohammad Ali, Zeba, Lehri	
Tamasha		Husna, Sultan, Panna, Nazar, Saqi	
Tere Shehar Mein		Zeba, Allauddin, Ajmal, Farida	
Yeh Jehan Wale		Deeba, Habib, Rani, Asad	
Zameen	Wazir Ali	Deeba, Allauddin, Asad, Zeenat	

== See also ==
- 1965 in Pakistan
