= List of Pakistani films of 1963 =

A list of films produced in Pakistan in 1963 (see 1963 in film) in the Urdu language:

== 1963 ==
Title	Director	Cast	Notes
1963
Aurat Eik Kahani		Nayyar Sultana, Ejaz Durrani, Husna, Saqi, Rajni	
Baarat	Rahim Gul	Neelo, Ratan Kumar, Naghma, Nazar, Zeenat	
Baghawat	Sudhir	Shimmi, Sudhir, Nayyar Sultana, Akmal, Talish	
Baaji	S. Suleman	Nayyar Sultana, Darpan, Zeba, Talish, Amy Minwala	
Damaad		Laila, Asad, Zeenat, Naghma	
Daaman	Qadeer Ghori	Sabiha Khanum, Santosh, Waheed Murad, Neelo, Talish	
Dhoop Chaon		Bahar, Ejaz Durrani, Sumita, Nasira	
Dilne Tujhe Maan Liya		Zeba, Kemal, Nirala, Mohammad Ali	
Dulhan		Nayyar Sultana, Darpan, Shamim Ara, Nabila, Habib	
Ek Tera Sahara	Najam Naqvi	Shamim Ara, Darpan, Rani, Jafferey	
Fanoos		Komea, Salman, Ilyas, Azad, Bibbo	
Ghazala		Shamim Ara, Habib, Nasira, Nazar	
Hamen Bhi Jeene Do		Hanif, Nazi, Kamal Irani, Qamar	
Ishq Per Zor Nahin		Jamila, Aslam Pervaiz, Ilyas, Talish	
Kala Aadmi		Habib, Neelo, Rukhsana, Rajni	
Kala Pani		Shamim Ara, Yasmeen, Sudhir, Habib	
Kancher Deyal	Zahir Raihan	Khan Ata, Anwar Hossain, Sumita Devi	East Pakistan
Khoon Ki Piyas		Laila, Yusuf, Rukhsana, Diljit	
Maa Beti		Zeba, Darpan, Lehri, Agha Jan, Sethi	
Maa Beti		Yasmeen, Yusuf, Rukhsana, Meena Shorey, Allauddin	
Maa Ke Ansoo		Nayyar Sultana, Habib, Zeenat, Naghma	
Main Ne Kya Jurm Kiya		Laila, Habib, Ajmal, Saqi, Aslam Pervaiz	
Marvi		Nighat, Fazlani, Bibbo, Charlie	
Mr. X		Mohammad Ali, Nirala, Nasira, Adeeb	
Nach Ghar	A. Jabbar Khan	Shabnam, Golam Mustafa, Nasima Khan	East Pakistan
Nateeja		Shamim Ara, Yusuf, Saba, Naeem Hashmi	
Neelam		Rukhsana, Sudhir, Asad Bokhari, Naghma, Zeenat	
Preet Na Jane Reet	M. Chaudhury	Shabnam, Khalil, Golam Mustafa, Surraiya	East Pakistan
Qanoon		Shamim Ara, Allauddin, Aslam Pervaiz, Nazar	
Qatal Ke Baad		Neelo, Kamal, Lehri, Aslam Pervaiz, Mohammad Ali	
Sazish	Anwar Kamal Pasha	Shamim Ara, Habib, Makrukh, Naghma	
Seema		Shamim Ara, Santosh, Panna, Sultan	
Shararat		Bahar, Mohammad Ali, Laila, Asad Jafferey	
Shikwah		Sabiha Khanum, Darpan, Neelo, Aslam Pervaiz	
Suhaag		Bahar, Habib, Nighat, Majid, Surraiya Bano	
Sumera		Zeba, Ratan Kumar, Naghma, Allauddin	
Talash	Mustafiz	Shabnam, Rahman, Shawkat Akbar, Rani Sarkar, Subhash Dutta	East Pakistan
Tangay Wala		Shamim Ara, Darpan, Lehri, Talish	
Teen Aur Teen		Meena Shorey, Habib, Lehri, Asad Jaffery	
Teer Andaz		Rukhsana, Sultan, Saba, Sahira	
Yahudi Ki Ladki		Nayyar Sultana, Darpan, Talish, Meena Shorey	

== See also ==
- 1963 in Pakistan
