= Paigham (1964 film) =

1964 film

- پیغام
- Directed by: Nazir Ajmeri
- Story by: Nazir Ajmeri
- Produced by: S. M. Yusuf; F. M. Sardar
- Starring: Shamim Ara; Sultan; Rukhsana
- Music by: A. Hameed
- Production companies: F&Y Movies
- Release date: 18 September 1964
- Country: Pakistan
- Language: Urdu

Paigham is a Pakistani social drama film, directed by Nazir Ajmeri, and co-produced by S. M. Yusuf and F. M. Sardar under banner F&Y Movies. It starred Shamim Ara, Sultan and Rukhsana. The film was remade by S. Suleman as Aaj Aur Kal (1976).

Paigham was a critical and commercial success. At the annual Nigar Award ceremony, it won an award in the category of Best comedian for Lehri.

== Plot ==
Mumtaz's elder sister took her own life due to the ill treatment by her in-laws, who demanded dowry. Mumtaz loved Shahbaz, but his father was greedy and wanted a wealthy bride with a substantial dowry. He preferred Khumar, Mumtaz's affluent friend, but agreed to marry Shahbaz to Mumtaz when her father promised a large dowry. However, on the wedding night, the money was stolen, and Mumtaz's father was left empty-handed. Shahbaz's father canceled the wedding, leaving Mumtaz's family devastated. Her father became mentally unstable, and her mother died.

Shahbaz's father then married him to Khumar, who sought revenge for her friend's situation. She made their life miserable, and Shahbaz eventually divorced her. However, Shahbaz's father was worried about the significant maher he had to return. They sold their house to repay the mehar, leading to poverty.

Shahbaz realized his mistake and began to care for Mumtaz. He fell ill and remembered her. His father approached Mumtaz's father, now recovered, and asked him to marry Mumtaz to Shahbaz, but he refused, reminding him of their past encounter. Khumar arrived and revealed that she and Shahbaz loved each other, and their marriage was fixed.

== Cast ==
- Shamim Ara as Khumar
- Sultan as Shahbaz
- Rukhsana as Mumtaz
- Lehri
- Rangeela
- M. Ismael
- Zeenat

== Soundtrack ==
All lyrics are written by Fayyaz Hashmi; all music is composed by A. Hameed

Paigham
No.	Title	Singer (s)	Length
1.	"Na Raas Aayi Wafa Dil Laga Ke Dekh Liya"	Munir Hussain
2.	"Aye Behno, Utho Woh Kaam Karain"	Mala Begum and chorus
3.	"Pyar Kiya Hai To Sanam, Pyar Nibhana Hoga"	Munir Hussain, Irene Perveen
4.	"Wafaon Ki Hum Ko, Saza To Na Do Gey"	Mala Begum, Naseem Begum and chorus
5.	"Sabar De Un Ghamzadon Ko"	Noor Jehan
6.	"Mohabbat Dard Mein Duba Hua Paigham Le Aayi"	Noor Jehan
7.	"Ja Re Bedardi, Tu Kya Jaane Pyar"	Noor Jehan

== Awards ==
At 1964 Nigar Awards, it received an award:

- Best comedian - Lehri
