= Pardah (film) =

- Directed by: Nazir Ajmeri
- Written by: Nazir Ajmeri
- Produced by: Nazir Ajmeri
- Starring: Shamim Ara; Habib; Saqi; Hameed Wain
- Cinematography: M. Fazil
- Music by: Safdar Hussain
- Production company: Bari Studio
- Release date: 18 March 1966
- Running time: ~ 2 hours and 20 minutes
- Country: Pakistan
- Language: Urdu

Pardah is a Pakistani Urdu film directed, produced and written by Nazir Ajmeri. It stars Shamim Ara and Habib in young to old roles. The film is about a man who kept one his secret under wraps for years. Music was composed by Safdar Hussain. At Box office, the film performed averagely.

The film was one of the final films of the director Ajmeri, who directed successful films like Kismet (1956) and Paigham (1963).

== Plot ==
Tired of his domestic tensions due to fights with his wife, Moazzam comes across a naive villager maiden, Zahida. He feels at ease in her company, and during his often visits to her spends good time with her. After her mother's death, the only individual of her family, he marries with her. Moazzam, who is already married, keeps his second marriage a secret and spends time with Zahida in another house. She gets pregnant and gives birth to a baby girl.

Years passed, and they still keep their marriage a secret. On adolescence, their daughter Mahjabeen come across two of her class-fellows who fall for her. Later, it is revealed that one of them is the son of Moazzam from his first wife, while the other one is his nephew.

== Cast ==
- Shamim Ara
- Habib
- Gulrukh
- Komal
- Roshan
- Shakeel
- Hameed Wain
- Saqi

== Release ==
The film was released on 18 March 1966 in the cinemas of Karachi and Lahore, and did average to flop business at the Box office.

== Soundtrack ==
The soundtrack album of the film was composed by Safdar Hussain, and lyrics by Fayyaz Hashmi.

=== Track list ===
- Bra Sukh Chain Mere Chote Se Gaon Mein by Irene Perveen, Munir Hussain and chorus
- Haye Allah Ji, Kaise Kis Ko Bataun by Mala Begum
- Idhar Aao, Tumhare Kaan Mein Ek Baat Kehna Hai by Saleem Raza and Mala
- Saaz-e-Dil Chera Hai Hum Ne by Mala
- Shaheedo Ka Khoon, Tum Se Kya Keh Raha Hai by Mala
