= Nabeela (actress) =

Pakistani actress

- Born: Shireen Gul; 29 December 1944; Lahore, British India
- Died: 9 July 1979 (aged 34); Lahore, Pakistan
- Other name: The Queen of Emotions
- Education: Lahore College
- Occupation: Actress
- Years active: 1963 – 1979
- Children: 1

Shireen Gul, also known as Nabeela (Urdu:نبیلہ) was a Pakistani actress working in Urdu and Punjabi language films. She was known as Malka-e-Jazbat (The Queen of Emotions) because of the tragic roles she often portrayed in films. She worked is known for her roles in the films Ashiana (1964), Badnaam (1966), Babul Da Wehra (1968), Jagg Beeti (1968), Pagri Sanbhal Jatta (1968), Saiqa (1968), Veryam (1969), Ishq Na Puchhay Zaat (1969), Sheran Day Puttar Sher (1969), Sajna Door Deya (1970), Maa Puttar (1970), Dunya Matlab Di (1970), Babul (1971), Charagh Kahan Roshni Kahan (1971).

== Early life ==
Shireen was born in 1944 in Lahore and completed her education from Lahore College.

== Career ==
Nabeela made her debut as an actress in S. M. Yusuf's Dulhan in 1963. Then, she appeared in Ashiana, Haveli, Bahu Begum and Kaneez.

Her breakthrough came in 1966 with Iqbal Shehzad's film Badnaam, in which she starred alongside Allauddin, Neelo, Ejaz Durrani and Rangeela. Suraiya Multanikar's song Baday Be-Murrawwat Hain Yeh Husn Waalay and a Lori from the film were picturised on her. The film, which was based on a short story by Saadat Hassan Manto, earned her Nigar Award for Best Supporting Actress.

Following the success of Badnaam, she was cast in 14 Saal, released in 1968, in her only leading role. She also appeared in Karishma, Saiqa and Babul Da Wehra later that year.

== Personal life ==
She lived at Lahore with her parents and pets, then later she got married and had one daughter.

== Death ==
Due to personal problems, she started taking drugs and died from an accidental overdose at the age of 34 on 9 July 1979.

== Filmography ==
=== Film ===
Year	Film	Language
1963	Dulhan	Urdu
1964	Jameela	Urdu
1964	Ashiana	Urdu
1964	Haveli	Urdu
1964	Aurat Ka Pyar	Urdu
1965	Bahu Begum	Urdu
1965	Kaneez	Urdu
1966	Misaal	Urdu
1966	Bhai Jan	Urdu
1966	Paidagir	Punjabi
1966	Badnaam	Urdu
1966	Woh Kon Thi	Urdu
1967	Imam Din Gohavia	Punjabi
1967	Kafir	Urdu
1967	Hamraz	Urdu
1968	Karishma	Urdu
1968	Zindagi	Urdu
1968	Babul Da Wehra	Punjabi
1968	Jagg Beeti	Punjabi
1968	Pagri Sanbhal Jatta	Punjabi
1968	14 Saal	Urdu
1968	Ek Musafir Ek Haseena	Urdu
1968	Saiqa	Urdu
1968	Mela 2 Din Da	Punjabi
1968	Aawara	Urdu
1969	Aasra	Urdu
1969	Haidar Khan	Punjabi
1969	Veryam	Punjabi
1969	Run Murid	Punjabi
1969	Lachhi	Punjabi
1969	14vin Sadi	Urdu
1969	Ishq Na Puchhay Zaat	Punjabi
1969	Sheran Day Puttar Sher	Punjabi
1969	Mehman	Urdu
1969	Jaggu	Punjabi
1970	Mahallaydar	Punjabi
1970	Sajna Door Deya	Punjabi
1970	Maa Puttar	Punjabi
1970	Wichhray Rabb Melay	Punjabi
1970	BeWafa	Urdu
1970	Bhai Chara	Punjabi
1970	Dil Dian Lagian	Punjabi
1970	Behram	Punjabi
1970	Rabb Di Shaan	Punjabi
1970	Dunya Matlab Di	Punjabi
1970	Tikka Mathay Da	Punjabi
1971	Raja Rani	Punjabi
1971	Ghunghroo	Punjabi
1971	Chanan Akhian Da	Punjabi
1971	Babul	Punjabi
1971	Bazigar	Punjabi
1971	Jatt Da Qoul	Punjabi
1971	Ghairat Mera Naa	Punjabi
1971	Charagh Kahan Roshni Kahan	Urdu
1971	Ishq Bina Ki Jeena	Punjabi
1971	Waris	Punjabi
1971	Al-Asifa	Urdu
1972	Eid Da Chann	Punjabi
1972	Ghairat Tay Qanoon	Punjabi
1972	Jagday Rehna	Punjabi
1972	Morcha	Punjabi
1972	Puttar 5 Daryawan Da	Punjabi
1973	Ziddi	Punjabi
1973	Khoon Da Badla Khoon	Punjabi
1973	Shado	Punjabi
1973	Wichhria Sathi	Punjabi
1973	Kubra Ashiq	Urdu
1973	Khushia	Punjabi
1973	Rangeela Ashiq	Punjabi
1974	Nagri Daata Di	Punjabi
1974	Pag Teri Hath Mera	Punjabi
1974	Badmash Puttar	Punjabi
1974	Maa Da Lal	Punjabi
1974	Sasta Khoon Mehnga Pani	Punjabi
1974	Sohna Mukhra	Punjabi
1974	Jadoo	Punjabi
1975	Khanzada	Punjabi
1975	A Pagg Meray Veer Di	Punjabi
1976	Mout Khed Jawana Di	Punjabi
1976	Akhar	Punjabi
1976	Hukam Da Ghulam	Punjabi
1976	Ajj Da Badmash	Punjabi
1976	Jatt Kurian Tun Darda	Punjabi
1976	Jawan Tay Medan	Punjabi
1977	Dada	Punjabi
1977	Danka	Punjabi
1977	Jeera Sain	Punjabi
1977	Aj Diyan Kurrian	Punjabi
1978	Gharib Da Baal	Punjabi
1978	Lathi Charge	Punjabi
1979	Bakka Rath	Punjabi
1980	Raju Rangbaz	Punjabi
1981	Shart	Punjabi
1981	Mohabbat Aur Majboori	Urdu

== Awards and recognition ==
Year	Award	Category	Result	Title	Ref.
1966	Nigar Award	Best Supporting Actress	Won	Badnaam	
