= Ashiana (1964 film) =

1964 film

- Directed by: S. M. Yusuf
- Written by: Hasrat Lakhnavi
- Produced by: S. M. Yusuf; F. M. Sardar
- Starring: Zeba; Kamal; Habib; Rukhsana; Nighat Sultana; Adeeb; Lehri
- Cinematography: Babar Bilal
- Music by: A. Hameed
- Production companies: F&Y Movies
- Release date: 9 October 1964
- Running time: 2 hours 30 minutes
- Country: Pakistan
- Language: Urdu

Ashiana is a 1964 Pakistani film directed by S. M. Yusuf, who also co-produced it.

Ashiana is the third collaboration of S. M. Yusuf with Fayyaz Hashmi and A.Hameed, after Saheli (1960) and Aulad (1962). S. M. Yusuf received his third Nigar Award for best director at the annual award ceremony.

== Plot ==
The plot focuses on Malik family, where the quarrelsome matriarch of the house Sabira Begum has full control on the house while the patriarch Malik Siraj is a soft-spoken and noble person. Their family comprises; an elder son Rasheed, his wife Husna and her son, his younger son Saeed, daughter Kishwar and son-in-law Aslam. Sabira has a typical cruel relation with Husna and Kishwar also does the exploitation all day. One day Saeed falls for a girl named Safia, the daughter of a rich father and decides to marry her. Before the marriage, Saeed warns Salma, Safia's stepmother about the bad environment of his house.

One day, Kishwar manipulates her brother Rasheed about his wife Husna to which he starts hating her and becomes close to a tawaif Samia. After marriage, Salma owns all the dowry items on Safia's name which Sabira doesn't like. She just starts beating her but then Salma comes in front of her, who was in Safia's dress. She insults Sabira and denies to send her daughter in her house. Safia, however, comes back to her husband silently and sends her sister-in-law Kishwar to her in-laws, who caused chaos in the house. She then controls the whole house, by grabbing the keys of the house from Sabira. Rasheed becomes poorer as he starts losing his wealth on Smaia. Safia warns Saeed to keep an eye on Rasheed, who one day catches him in Samia's house in drunken state and brings him back. Kishwar returns and creates a doubt in Safia's mind by misrepresenting things about Husna and Saeed.

Safia doubts Saeed while observing him who confronts his sister-in-law Husna, and starts making a noise there. Rasheed who is in drunken state also comes there and throws Husna out of the house. Safia also goes to her father's house. Saeed goes to convince her but she doesn't believe her. Salma helps them in their problems, and tells them a plan according to which, Saeed with his manager brings Rasheed to right path. Safia becomes a servant at Salma's house so that she can save Rasheed from her. Rasheed sells the business and mortgages the house. At Salma's house, Saeed comes where both the brothers argue. Rasheed brings his father for his support who slaps Saeed. He decides to handle the business himself but learns of Rasheed's evil antics in the meantime.

Rasheed and Samia decides to elope but Husna and Saeed discovers their plan. Samia's brother catches them with the help of police, but on veil lifting, Husna appears there instead of Samia to which police leaves them. He apologies Husna for his injustices and goes to his house with her. Salma prevents the selling of their house and everyone starts living there happily.

== Cast ==
- Zeba as Safia
- Kamal as Saeed
- Habib as Rasheed
- Rukhsana as Husna
- Nighat Sultana as Salma
- Lehri as Malik Siraj
- Nabeela as Kishwar
- Asad Jafri as Aslam
- Asha Posley as Sabira
- Samia Naaz as Samia
- G.N. Butt as Manager
- Najmul Hasan as Safia's father
- Adeeb as Zahir
- Tamanna
- Sultan Rahi (guest appearance)

== Soundtrack ==
All lyrics are written by Fayyaz Hashmi; all music is composed by A. Hameed.

Ashiana
No.	Title	Singer (s)	Length
1.	"Ek Haseen Meharban, Pyar Ka Yeh Samaan "	Mala, Irene Perveen
2.	"Ja Re Bedardi Tunay Kahin Ka, Hamain Na Chora"	Mala & chorus
3.	"Baray Sangdil Ho, Baray Na-samajh Ho, Tumhein Pyar Karna Sikhana Parey Ga "	Ahmed Rushdi, Mala
4.	"Jee, Dekha Jo Unhen, Dil Ne Chupke Se Kaha"	Ahmed Rushdi, Mala
5.	"Jo Dil Ko Tortey Hain, Unka Bhi Jawab Nahin"	Munir Hussain

== Reception ==
=== Box office ===
Ashiana celebrated its silver jubilee at the box office after a theatrical run of 39 weeks.

=== Critical reception ===
In a review of the film by The Illustrated Weekly of Pakistan, the cinematography was praised but direction was faulted stating "If one ignores the old style of Yusuf's direction, then "Ashiana" can be termed as a good film technically. It has good photography and sets are ornate which have been exploited well. But the characters roam about as if acting on a theatrical stage."

In another article, the same newspaper included Ashiana among the films that retained best wing of West Pakistan in 1964.

== Awards ==
Year	Awards	Category	Awardee	Ref.
1964	Nigar Awards	Best Director	S. M. Yusuf	
1964	Nigar Awards	Best Cinematographer	Babar Bilal	
