= A. Hameed =

Pakistani music composer (1924 - 1991)

- Shaikh Abdul Hameed a.k.a. A. Hameed

Background information
- Also known as: A. Hameed
- Born: Shaikh Abdul Hameed; 1924; Amritsar, Punjab, British India (present-day India)
- Origin: Punjabi
- Died: 20 May 1991 (aged 66–67) Rawalpindi, Punjab, Pakistan
- Occupations: Composer; Music director
- Instrument: Piano
- Years active: 1957 – 1991
- Formerly of: Bollywood; Lollywood

A. Hameed (born Shaikh Abdul Hameed; 1924 – 20 May 1991) was a Pakistani film score composer and music director.

He started his career in Bombay cinema (in modern-day Bollywood) and later worked in Lollywood, the Pakistan film industry originally based in Lahore. The first Pakistani film he worked on as a director was Anjaam (1957). However, he earned his recognition in Pakistani film industry as a music composer.

== Biography ==
Shaikh Abdul Hameed was born in 1924 in Amritsar, British India (now India). He initially worked in Hindi film industry with the veteran music composer Ghulam Haider as a pianist, and subsequently composed music in Pakistan for the films Anjaam (1957) and Bharosa (1958).

His family later migrated to Pakistan following the partition of India in 1947 and worked in Pakistani films as a composer. His first hit film song that became very popular was in Raat Ke Rahi (1960). The same year, the widely popular film Saheli gained him a lot of recognition as a music composer. Another popular film Aulad (1962) followed with notable songs, "Naam le le ke tera hum to jiye jaen ge" (Naseem Begum), and Tum mile pyar mila ab koi armaan nahin (Naseem Begum - Munir Hussain). His next musical creation was film Tauba (1964). It made a great impact with its melodious tracks. Munir Hussain and Saleem Raza's Qawwali, "Na milta gar ye tauba ka sahaara hum kahaan jaate" and Noor Jehan's song "O re sanam dil yeh kaise bataye" became very popular.

== Filmography ==
| # | Title | Year | Credited as | Ref. |
|---|---|---|---|---|
| 1 | Anjaam | 1957 | Music composer | |
| 2 | Saheli | 1960 | Music composer | |
| 3 | Aulad | 1962 | Music composer | |
| 4 | Susral | 1962 | Music composer | |
| 5 | Paigham | 1964 | Music composer | |
| 6 | Ashiana | 1974 | Music composer | |
| 7 | Gharnata | 1971 | Music composer | |
| 8 | Yeh Aman | 1971 | Music composer | |
| 9 | Bahisht | 1974 | Music composer | |
| 10 | Begum Jaan | 1977 | Music composer | |
| 11 | Awaz | 1978 | Music composer | |
| 12 | Behan Bhai | 1979 | | |
| 13 | Naya Andaz | 1979 | | |
| 14 | Sangdil | 1982 | | |

== Popular film songs ==
| Year | Film | Song title | Sung by | Lyrics by | Notes |
|---|---|---|---|---|---|
| 1960 | Raat Ke Rahi | Kiya Hua Dil Pe Sitam, Tum Na Samjho Ge Balam | Zubaida Khanum | Fayyaz Hashmi | His first breakthrough hit film song |
| 1960 | Saheli | Mukhre Pe Sehra Daale, Aaja O' Aane Waale | Nasim Begum and Nazir Begum | Fayyaz Hashmi | Producer/Director S. M. Yusuf; A Silver jubilee film |
| 1960 | Saheli | Hum Bhool Gayey Har Baat, Magar Tera Pyar Nahin Bhoolay | Nasim Begum | Fayyaz Hashmi | |
| 1976 | Surayya Bhopali | Tha yaqeen key aen gi ye rataan kabhi | Naheed Akhtar | Saifuddin Saif | |
| 1960 | Saheli | Kahin Do Dil Jo Mil Jaate, Bigirta Kya Zamane Ka | Saleem Raza and Nasim Begum | Fayyaz Hashmi | |
| 1962 | Aulad | Naam Le Le Ke Tera Hum Tau Jiye Jaaen Gae | Nasim Begum | Fayyaz Hashmi | |
| 1962 | Aulad | Tum Qaum Ki Maan Ho Socho Zara, Aurat Se Hamein Yeh Kehna Hai | Nasim Begum | Fayyaz Hashmi | |
| 1964 | Tauba | Na Milta Gar Yeh Tauba Ka Sahara, Tau Hum Kahan Jaatey | Saleem Raza and Munir Hussain | Fayyaz Hashmi | Hamd Qawwali |
| 1965 | Shabnam | Chun Liya Mein Ne Tumhein Sara Jahan Rehne Diya | Noor Jehan | Fayyaz Hashmi | |
| 1971 | Angaare | Ab Ke Hum Bichhre Tau Shayad Kabhi Khwaboun Mein Milein | Mehdi Hassan | Ahmad Faraz | |
| 1971 | Yeh Aman | Zulm Rahe Aur Aman Bhi Ho, Kaise Mumkin Hai Tum Hi Kaho | Noor Jehan and Mehdi Hassan | Habib Jalib | A film about freedom struggle in Kashmir |
| 1974 | Samaaj | Chalo Kahin Dur Yeh Samaj Chhorr Dein | Mehdi Hassan and Mala | Riaz ur Rehman Saghar | Ended up being a breakthrough film song and became a highly popular song for the film song lyricist Riaz ur Rehman Saghar. His professional career got a big boost after writing this song. |
| 1974 | Jawab Do | Zindagi ja chhor de peechha mera | Mehdi Hassan and Noor Jehan | | |
| 1975 | Professor | Janam janam tera mera saath rahe ga | Runa Laila | | |
| 1976 | Surraya Bhopali | Jis taraf aankh uthaon teri tasveeran hain | Nahid Akhtar and Mehdi Hassan | | |
| 1978 | Mazi, Haal, Mustaqbil | Zindagi tu ne har qadam pe mujhe | Ghulam Abbas and Mehnaz | | |
| 1978 | Awaz | Tu mere pyaar ka geet hai | Mehdi Hassan / Nahid Akhtar / Asad Amanat Ali | | |
| 1979 | Naya Andaz | Sanson mein hai tu | A. Nayyar and Noor Jehan | | |
| 1981 | Watan | Ae dost teri ankh jo nam hai | Ghulam Abbas | | |

== Awards and recognition ==
- Nigar Award for Best Music Director in Dosti (1971).

== Death ==
A. Hameed died in Rawalpindi, Pakistan on 20 May 1991.
