= Zamana Kya Kahega =

1961 film

- Directed by: Iqbal Yousuf
- Written by: Fayyaz Hashmi
- Screenplay by: Hasrat Lakhnavi
- Starring: Shamim Ara; Kamal; Lehri
- Music by: Muslehuddin
- Production companies: F&Y Movies
- Release date: 10 November 1961
- Country: Pakistan
- Language: Urdu

Zamana Kya Kahega is a Pakistani film directed by Iqbal Yousuf, son of veteran filmmaker S. M. Yusuf who co-produced it as well under banner F&Y Movies.

Hasrat Lakhnavi wrote the screenplay based on a story by Fayyaz Hashmi. The film stars Shamim Ara, Kamal and Lehri. The soundtrack was composed by Muslehuddin.

It was released on 10 November 1961, and became a moderate success at the box office.

It was Yousuf's second film after his directorial debut Raat Ke Rahi (1960) which failed at the box office despite having similar genre of a spy film. Zamana Kya Kahega was among his commercially successful films as his later venture Daal Mein Kala (1962) also failed commercially. The film was selected to exhibit in Tehran, Damascus, Beirut and Ankara in 1965 to explore the market for Lollywood films. The film received 2 Nigar Awards in the Best Cinematography and Best Sound Editing categories.

== Cast ==
- Shamim Ara
- Kamal
- Lehri
- Rukhsana
- S. Gul
- Faizi
- Saqi
- Sikandar

== Soundtrack ==
All music is composed by Muslehuddin.

Zamana Kya Kahega
No.	Title	Lyrics	Singer (s)	Length
1.	"Raat Saloni Aayi, Baat Anoki Layi"	Fayyaz Hashmi	Ahmed Rushdi, Naheed Niazi
2.	"Dil Na Janay Kab Aaye Ga Hazoor"	Fayyaz Hashmi	Naseem Begum
3.	"Kaisa Safar Hai Kahiye"	Fayyaz Hashmi	Ahmed Rushdi, Naheed Niazi
4.	"Lab Pe Yeh Sharmana Ji"	Fayyaz Hashmi	Ahmed Rushdi, Irene Perveen
5.	"Kahay Ko Jhagar Ke, Chalay Ho Akkar Ke"	Nazim Panipati	Ahmed Rushdi

== Release ==
Zamana Kya Kahega was released on 10 November 1961. It celebrated its silver jubilee at the box office.

== Awards ==
Year	Awards	Category	Awardee	Ref.
1961	Nigar Awards	Best cinematography	Riaz Bukhari	
1961	Nigar Awards	Best Sound Editing	Zafar Khawaja	
