= Surayya =

- ثریّا
- Directed by: Shabab Kiranvi
- Screenplay by: Dialogues: Shabab Kiranvi; Shatir Ghaznavi
- Story by: Shabab Kiranvi
- Produced by: Mujaddad Ali
- Starring: Nayyar Sultana; Habib-ur-Rehman
- Cinematography: A. Hameed
- Music by: Akhtar Hussain; Mohammad Ali Munnu
- Release date: 13 January 1961
- Country: Pakistan
- Language: Urdu

Surayya is a 1961 Pakistani melodrama film directed by Shabab Kiranvi, who also wrote the screenplay and dialogues. The films stars Nayyar Sultana in the titular role along with Habib-ur-Rehman, who played the male lead, and both played the young to old roles in the film. The film was released in January 1961 and was a box office hit. At annual Nigar Awards, Rehman won Best Actor award for his performance in the film.

== Plot ==
Surayya and Yousuf love each other since childhood however, get separate when Surayya's brother Toufik decides to marry her with Dilshad. Yousuf sends her mother to Surayya's house with his proposal but Toufik denies her insultingly due to past conflict between the two families.

Surayya goes to Lahore after marrying Dilshad. On the other hand, Yousuf's mother gets him married to Yaseem. He gets a job of manager in Dilshad's office in Lahore. After an year, Yasmeen dies after giving birth to a child. On the other hand, Surayya gives birth to still child. Due to Surayya and Dilshad's sorrow, Buland Iqbal (son-in-law of Dilshad's aunt) advises Dilshad to adapt Yousuf's son which will be beneficial for both of them, as his own wife has died and it will be difficult to brought him up with mother. In this way, Dilshad brings Yousuf's child to his house but on repenting of his decision of separating of a father from his son, he allows Yousuf to visit his house to meet his child. There, he encounters Surayya.

== Cast ==
- Nayyar Sultana as Surayya
- Habib-ur-Rehman as Yousuf
- Azad as Toufik
- Asad Bokhari as Dilshad
- Salma Mumtaz as Toufik's wife
- Bibbo as Yousuf's mother
- Zeenat as Dilshad's aunt
- Ali Baba as Buland Iqbal
- Shehzad as Mushtaq
- Yasmin as Yasmeen
- Nasira as Razia
- Rukhsana as Najmi, Toufik's daughter
- Aslam Pervaiz as Saleem

== Release ==
The film released on 13 January 1961.

== Music ==
All music is composed by Mohammad Ali Munnu and Akhtar Hussain Akhian.

Surayya
No.	Title	Lyrics	Music	Singer (s)	Length
1.	"Aaj Mere Munnay Ki Salgirah Hai"	Adil	Mohammad Ali Munnu	Irene Perveen and chorus
2.	"Pyar Kehtay Hai Jisay, Yeh Pyar Hai Hazoor"	Ghulam Rabbani	Akhtar Hussain Akhian	Kausar Parveen
3.	"Bachpan Beeta Aayi Jawani"	Shabab Kiranvi	Akhtar Hussain Akhian	Munir Hussain, Irene Perveen
5.	"Bhaiya Ki Ladli Ho, Bhabhi Ki Pyari"	Shabab Kiranvi	Akhtar Hussain Akhian	Kausar Parveen, Irene Perveen and chorus
6.	"Ladlay, Chal Mere Ladlay, Chal Sapno Ke Des"	Shabab Kiranvi	Akhtar Hussain Akhian	Naseem Begum
7.	"Kitna Bedard Yeh Zamana Hai, Begunnah Zulam Ka Nishana Hai"	Shabab Kiranvi	Mohammad Ali Munnu	Munir Hissain

== Awards ==
- Nigar Award for Best Actor - Habib-ur-Rehman
