= Sangdil (1982 film) =

Pakistani film

- سنگدل
- Directed by: Hassan Tariq
- Written by: Syed Noor
- Produced by: S.A. Gul
- Starring: Nadeem; Babra Sharif; Bindiya
- Cinematography: Kamran Mirza
- Edited by: Asghar
- Music by: A. Hameed
- Distributed by: Evernew Pictures
- Release date: 2 April 1982
- Running time: 150 minutes
- Country: Pakistan
- Language: Urdu

Sangdil (Urdu: سنگدل, lit. 'Stone-Heart') is a 1982 Pakistani film directed by Hassan Tariq, written by Syed Noor and produced by A. Hameed. It stars Nadeem, Babra Sharif and Bindiya in leading roles.

== Plot ==
The story is about a widower Waqar and has two children whom he loves deeply. Later, he meets Roshi a singer, and Waqar's children begin to like her due to her kind and sweet nature. Then he marries her so that his children can have someone as a mother.

== Cast ==
- Nadeem as Waqar / Tiger
- Babra Sharif as Roshi
- Bindiya as Rita
- Sabiha Khanum as Madame
- Nanha as Anees
- Nabila as Jamila
- Sumair as Efi
- Talat Siddiqui as Roshi's mother
- Aslam Pervaiz as Black Jack
- Agha Talish as Shauket

== Production ==
Sangdil was filmed in Lahore and it was presented by Evernew Pictures. Kamran Mirza was the cinematographer and Asghar was the editor. Film director Hassan Tariq died soon after making this film.

== Music ==
All lyrics are written by Saifuddin Saif and Saeed Gilani; all music is composed by A. Hameed

Sangdil
No.	Title	Singer (s)	Length
1.	"Aao Naa Pyar Karen"	Nazia Hassan	4:14
2.	"Disco Deewane"	Nazia Hassan	4:06
3.	"Tum Na Karo Pyar"	Naheed Akhtar	4:10
4.	"Log Kehte Hain"	Mehnaz Begum	5:00
5.	"Mera Baalam Aane Wale Hai"	Naheed Akhtar	4:14
6.	"Ab Main Nahin Tumhara"	Ghulam Abbas	3:40
7.	"Yeh Aap Ki Mehfil Hai"	Ghulam Abbas	3:32
8.	"Jahan Tak Haden"	A. Nayyar & Mehnaz Begum	7:44
9.	"Chandan Ke Ubtan Se"	Mehnaz Begum	1:22
10.	"Saij Ki Har Shikan Se"	A. Nayyar & Mehnaz Begum	5:05
11.	"Bada Afsous Hai Daddy"	Naheed Akhtar & Mehnaz Begum	4:29
12.	"Tum Jo Honge Juda Ek"	Mehnaz Begum & Naheed Akhtar	4:24
13.	"Chupke Ke Zindagi"	Mehnaz Begum	1:54
14.	"Koi Pankhari Agar"	Naheed Akhtar	4:40
15.	"Tum Jo Honge Juda Do"	Mehnaz Begum	1:01

== Awards ==
Year	Award	Category	Result	Recipients and nominees	Ref.
1982	Nigar Award	Best Actress	Won	Babra Sharif	
1982	Nigar Award	Best Actor	Won	Nadeem	
1982	Nigar Award	Best Scriptwriter	Won	Syed Noor	
1982	Nigar Award	Best Director	Won	Hassan Tariq	
1982	Nigar Award	Best Film	Won	Sangdil	
1982	Nigar Award	Best Supporting Actress	Won	Sabiha Khanum	
1982	Nigar Award	Best Cinematographer	Won	Kamran Mirza	
1982	Nigar Award	Best Film Editor	Won	Asghar	
1982	Nigar Award	Best Art Director	Won	Islam Shahabi	
1982	Nigar Award	Best Sound Editor	Won	M. Zafar	

== Reception ==
The film was released on 2 April 1982, and was a box office super hit film. It became a Diamond jubilee film.
