= Devdas (1965 film) =

- Directed by: Khawaja Sarfaraz
- Written by: Naseem Rizwani; Khawaja Sarfaraz (screenplay)
- Based on: Devdas by Sharat Chandra Chattopadhyay
- Produced by: Nawaz; Khawaja Sarfaraz
- Starring: Shamim Ara; Habib; Nayyar Sultana
- Narrated by: Bimal Roy
- Cinematography: Irshad Ahmad
- Music by: Akhtar Hussain
- Release date: June 25, 1965
- Country: Pakistan
- Language: Urdu

Devdas (Urdu: ﺩﯾﻮﺩﺍﺱ) is a 1965 Pakistani drama movie directed by Khawaja Sarfaraz, based on the Sharat Chandra Chattopadhyay's famous 1917 Bengali novel Devdas. It starred Habib, Shamim Ara and Nayyar Sultana in lead roles supported by Asad Bukhari, Azad, Ajmal, Maya Devi and Razia. Sultan Rahi appears in the film as an extra.

== Plot ==
Dev's return from the city after completion of his education excites her childhood lover Paro. However, Paro's mother doubts on this relationship considering the status of his father, who is the thakur of the village. Seeing Paro and Dev's closeness, her decide to take it further and asks Dev's father to marry them. Dev's fsther however denies leading Paro's father to take a firm decision of marry her daughter in more noble and rich family than of Thakur. Paro asks Dev to retrieve the decision but he denies saying it is against their dignity. Dev writes aletter for Paro mentioning that their union is impossible leading further dostances between them. The disheartened Dev's friend then takes him to a tawaif Chandarmukhi's place on his demand. At first sight, Chandarmukhi falls for Dev finding him attractive.

== Cast ==
- Shamim Ara as Parvati
- Habib as Devdas
- Nayyar Sultana as Chandramukhi
- Asad Bukhari
- Azad
- Ajmal
- Rani Kiran
- Maya Devi
- Razia
- Sultan Rahi

== Soundtrack ==
Lyrics are written by Qateel Shifai and Roop Baivt and the music is composed by Akhtar Hussain.

- "Bairi, Akhian Na Kehna Mora Manay" sung by Naseem Begum
- "Dil Mein Koi Aas Nahin" sung by Saleem Raza
- "Kya Mangen, Is Dunya Say" sung by Saleem Raza
- "Maan Bhi Ja Gori" sung by Naheed Niazi
- "Manzil Apni Door O, Sathi" sung by Ahmed Rushdi
- "Mori Pooja Kay Phool Murjhaye" sung by Kausar Perveen
- "Nacho, Nacho, Manwa Moray" sung by Irene Perveen
- "Ruk Ja, O Bewafa" sung by Kausar Perveen
- "Taskeen Jo Day Jatay" sung by Saleem Raza
- "Theis Lagati Hay Yeh Dunya" sung by Naseem Begum

== Background and reception ==
The film is one of the many adaptations of the Bengali novel of the same name, and was the first of the two Pakistani films on the novel.

=== Critical reception ===
While reviewing the performances of the lead cast, The Illustrated Weekly of Pakistan criticised Habib's performance and called it a complete disappointment. About Sultana'a performance, the newspaper remarked that she looks uncomfortable in her role. Ara's performance was however praised.
