= List of Pakistani films of 1968 =

A list of films produced in Pakistan in 1968 (see 1968 in film) and in the Urdu language:

== 1968 ==
Title	Director	Cast	Notes
1968
Adalat	Hassan Tariq	Zeba, Hyder, Rani, Rukhsana, Aslam Pervaiz	
Alif Laila		Ghazala, Syed Kamal, Rozina, Aslam Pervaiz, Zeenat	
Ashiq		Deeba, Kamal, Aaliya, Talish	
Aurat Aur Zamana		Husna, Kamal, Talish, Shahnawaz	
Awaara		Syed Kamal, Naghma, Nabila, Salma Mumtaz	
Baalam		Zeba, Darpan, Aslam Pervaiz, Nazar	
Behan Bhai	Hassan Tariq	Nadeem, Deeba, Husna, Aslam Pervaiz, Ejaz, Kamal	
Beti Beta		Firdaus, Ejaz, Rozina, Talish	
Chand Aur Chandni	Ehtesham	Shabana, Nadeem, Reshma, Dear Ashgar	East Pakistan
Chauda Saal		Yusuf, Nabila, Sabira Sultana, Asif Jah	
Cheen Le Azadi		Rani, Sudhir, Saloni, Adeeb	
Commander		Sabiha, Santosh, Rani, Saiqa	
Dara		Rani, Nasrullah Butt, Adeeb, Aaliya	
Dhoop Aur Saey		Attiya Ashraf, Ali Ejaz, Qavi, Munnawer Taufiq	
Dil Diya Dard Liya		Zeba, Mohammed Ali, Ghazala, M. Akhtar	
Dil Mera Dharkan Teri	M. A. Rashid	Shamim Ara, Rani, Waheed Murad, Lehri	
Do Bhai		Saloni, Ejaz, Habib, Adeeb	
Doosri Maa		Shamim Ara, Syed Kamal, Lehri, Rozina	
Doosri Shadi	Hassan Tariq	Saloni, Ejaz, Deeba, Nazar	
Eik Hi Rasta	Hassan Tariq	Rani, Sudhir, Talish, Salma Mumtaz	
Eik Musafir Eik Haseena		Nayyar, Darpan, Lehri, Kamal, Saboohi	
Ghar Pyara Ghar		Reshma, Kamal, Najma, Allaudin	
Gori	Mohsin	Nasima Khan, Rahman, Akbar, Khalil	East Pakistan
Harfun Maula		Sudhir, Firdaus, Yusuf Khan, Allaudin	
Ismet		Ejaz, Husna, Zeba, Aslam Pervaiz, Ragni	
Jaan-e-Azro	Qadeer Ghori	Shamim Ara, Waheed Murad, Aslam Pervaiz, Salma Mumtaz	
Jahan Baje Shehnai	Rahman	Suchanda, Rahman, Anwar, Arshad Imam	East Pakistan
Jahan Tum Wahan Hum	Pervez Malik	Shabnam, Waheed Murad, Nirala, Badar Munir	
Janglee Phool	M. Shahjehan	Sultana Zaman, Khalil, Akbar, Suchanda	East Pakistan
Josh-e-Intiqam		Deeba, Shakeel, Zamarrud, Nanna, Adeeb	
Jugnoo	Mamnoon Khan	Sharmili Ahmed, Akbar, Dear Asghar, Jalil Afghani	East Pakistan
Karishma		Neelo, Mohammed Ali, Nabila, Aslam Pervaiz	
Katari		Zamarrud, Tariq Aziz, Ejaz, Mustafa Qureshi	
Khilona		Shamim Ara, Kamal, Sofia Bano, Aslam Pervaiz	
Lalarukh		Neelo, Mohammed Ali, Asad, Talish, Adeeb	
Mafroor		Zeba, Sudhir, Nasira, Aslam Pervaiz, Talish	
Mahal		Zeba, Mohammed Ali, Zamarrud, Aslam Pervaiz, Lehri	
Main Kahan Manzil Kahan		Nadeem, Zamarrud, Ada, Ejaz	
Main Zinda Hoon	M. Salim	Shabnam, Sudhir, Ejaz, Adeeb	
Manzil Door Nahin		Hanif, Sofia Bano, Fozina, Sajjad	
Mera Ghar Meri Jannat	Hassan Tariq	Shamin Ara, Mohammed Ali, Saqi, Rani	
Meri Dosti Mera Pyar	A. Hameed	M. Akhter, Rosy, Anarkali, Zahid, Saiqa	
Mujhe Jeene Do		Zeba, Mohammed Ali, Zamarrud, Rangeela, Ajmal	
Nadir Khan		Nayyar Sultana, Habib, Aslam Pervaiz, Rekha	
Nahreed		Sabiha, Santosh, Deeba, Aslam Pervaiz, Farida	
Nakhuda		Rukhsana, Shakeel, Zammurud, Ibrahim Nafees	
Paapi		Bano, Shakeel, Sitara, Shahina	
Padosi		Deeba, Nadeem, M. Ismail, Abbas Nausha	
Pakeezah		Ejaz, Zeba, Mohammed Ali, Gulrukh	
Paristan		Neelo, Mohammed Ali, Nazar, Asad, Zamarrud	
Quli	Mustafiz	Nadeem, Shabana, Sujata, Azim, Naina	East Pakistan
Saiqa		Shamim Ara, Mohammed Ali, Talish, Darpan, Santosh, Zamarrud	
Samandar	Rafiq Rizvi	Shabnam, Waheed Murad, Hanif, Rozina, Rashid	
Sangdil		Nadeem, Deeba, Masood Ahkter, Rozina	
Shahi Mahal		Mohammed Ali, Firdaus, Aslam Pervaiz, Hameed Wain	
Shareek-e-Hayat	S. M. Yusuf	Shabnam, Kamal, Sabira Sultana, Lehri	
Shahansha-e-Jahangir		Sabiha Khanum, Santosh Kumar, Ejaz Durrani, Saloni	
Shehnai	Syed Kamal	Deeba, Syed Kamal, Lehri, Jaffery, Reshma	
Soeey Nadya Jage Pani	Khan Ataur Rahman	Kabori Sarwar, Hasan Imam, Rosy, Jalil Afghani	East Pakistan
Sone ki Chidya		Ghazala, Mohammed Ali, Ilyas, Sabira Sultana	
Taj Mahal		Zeba, Mohammed Ali, Rehan, Talish, Aalyia	
Tum Mere Ho	Suroor Barabankvi	Shabnam, Nadeem, Sofia, Dear Asghar	
Wali Ehad		Saloni, Habib, Saqi, Mazhar Shah	
Zalim		Ejaz, Rani, Saloni, Adeeb	
Zindagi		Ghazala, Shakeel, Tariq Aziz, Talish	

== See also ==
- 1968 in Pakistan
