= Muslehuddin (composer) =

Pakistani and Bengali music composer (1932-2003)

Moslehuddin
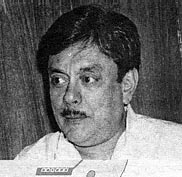
- Born: Abul Qasim Mohammed Moslehuddin; 27 October 1932; Bengal Presidency, British India
- Died: 6 August 2003 (aged 70); England
- Occupations: Music composer/director for films, stage and television with Pakistan TV and BBC
- Years active: 1950s – 1960s, 1970s (Film, TV and stage) to 1990s (mainly TV and stage)
- Education: Master of Commerce degree in commerce and economics
- Alma mater: University of Dhaka
- Notable work: Zindagi mein aik phal bhi; Raat saloni aayee; Raat chalee hai jhoom kay. Akasher Oi Miti Miti (Bengali).
- Spouse: Nahid Niazi
- Children: Feisal Mosleh, Nermin Mosleh (Nermeen Parry)
- Awards: Pride of Performance Award by the President of Pakistan in 1970; Tamgha-e-Imtiaz (Medal of Excellence) Award by the Government of Pakistan in 1969; Won Nigar Award in 1960

Moslehuddin (born Abul Qasim Mohammed Moslehuddin; 27 October 1932 – 6 August 2003; also spelled Muslehuddin) was a Pakistani film score composer and music director. He composed music for sixteen Lollywood films besides contributing to Pakistan Television (PTV), the BBC, Bengali music and stage and TV shows.

At the young age of sixteen, he started his career as a composer. He married Nahid Niazi in Lahore, Pakistan, on 10 January 1964.

Niazi was a very prominent Pakistani singer who worked with all of the top music directors in Pakistan before and after their marriage. In PTV shows like Kaliyon Ki Mala (the first children's TV music programme in Pakistan started under the name Padma Kee Mouje by Moslehuddin in 1964), Moslehuddin and Nahid Niazi both wrote (music and lyrics), sang, and produced songs.

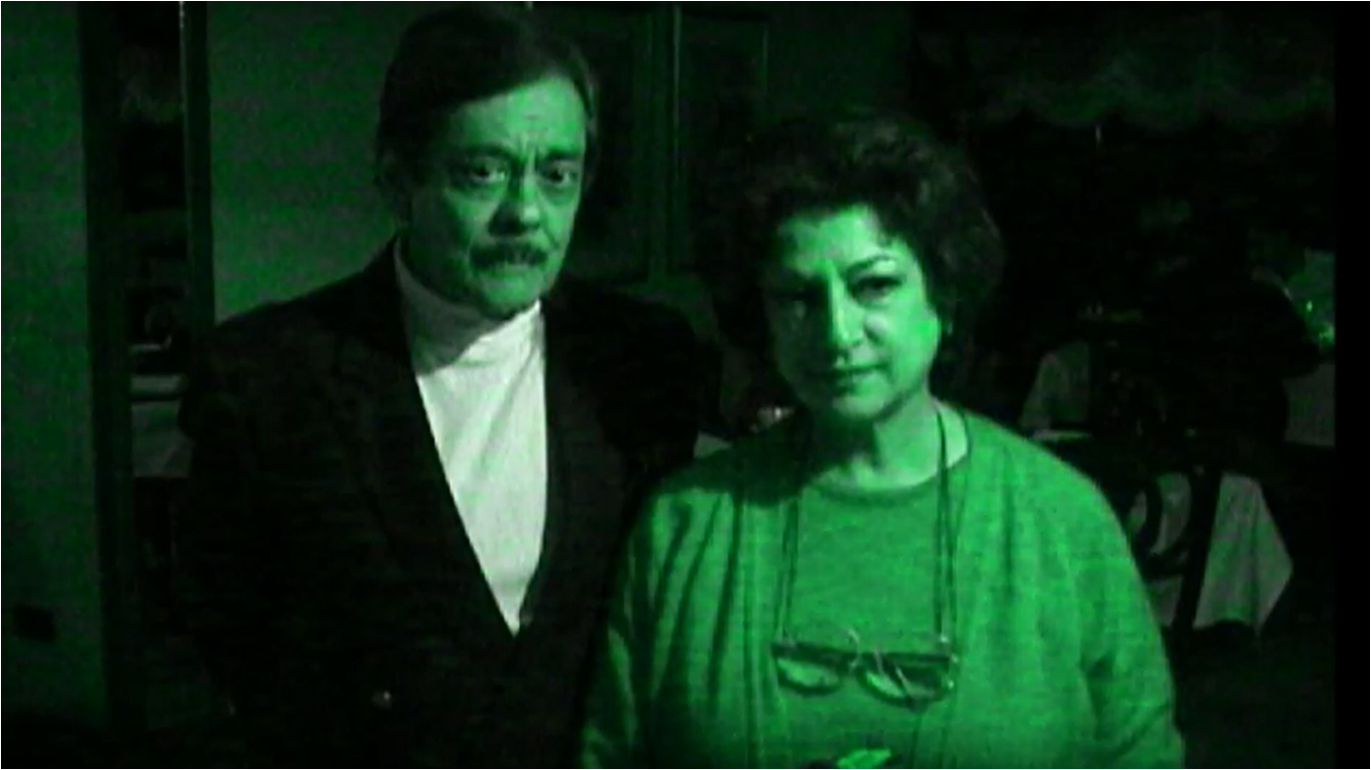
Music composer Moslehuddin with his playback singer wife Nahid Niazi in Pakistan under studio night light c. 2000

== Biography ==
He was born as Abul Qasim Mohammed Moslehuddin on 27 October 1932 in Bengal Presidency (in modern-day Bangladesh). He later migrated to West Pakistan in 1956. After obtaining an M.Com. degree in Commerce and Economics from the University of Dhaka, he went to Lahore where he initially started working in Pakistani film industry as a music composer. He and Deebo Bhattacharya were the two Bengali composers who started their musical careers in the 1950s from West Pakistan. In 1958, he met Luqman, a Pakistani film director who introduced him in his film titled Aadmi. He also composed music for Humsafar (1960 film), which became the recipient of a Nigar Award in the Best Music category in 1960. He introduced Western, Arabic and Bengali-style music to films.

He composed music for various Urdu films such as Daal Mein Kaala, Deewana, Joker, Jaan Pehchaan, Rahguzar and Josh among others. Besides his contribution to the film industry, he worked for Pakistan Television Corporation which he originally joined in 1964 and was one of its pioneering artists. He along with his wife produced the first children's television series focused on music and songs such as Kaliyon Ki Mala and Padma Kee Mouje.

One of the most famous songs that Moslehuddin composed was the Bengali song Akasher Oi Miti Miti. Moslehuddin wrote the music and the lyrics for this song. Before Moslehuddin married Nahid Niazi she recorded Moslehuddin's famous song Is "Jahan Mein Kash Koi Dil Lagaye" sung by Nahid Niazi and Saleem Raza.

In the 1960s Moslehuddin traveled to Calcutta, India to record Hemant Kumar for the song Raat Sohani Hai.

In 1971, Moslehuddin and his wife went to the U.K. to record for the BBC and do various tours doing musical shows . During this time the split of East Pakistan happened and they decided to apply to remain and migrate to the U.K. in 1971. Moslehuddin spent much of his life in the U.K. but also spent months at a time visiting Pakistan and the USA to visit his son Feisal. Both Moslehuddin and his wife Nahid continued working for Pakistan Television in the 1970s, 80s and 90s and produced many new songs and performances. They both also worked for the BBC, and Moslehuddin managed multiple musical performances for the BBC both in Birmingham (Pebble Mill) and London over many of the years he spent in the U.K. Some of these performances are viewable on YouTube. e.g. https://www.youtube.com/watch?v=htvrLScwzeo&t=152s

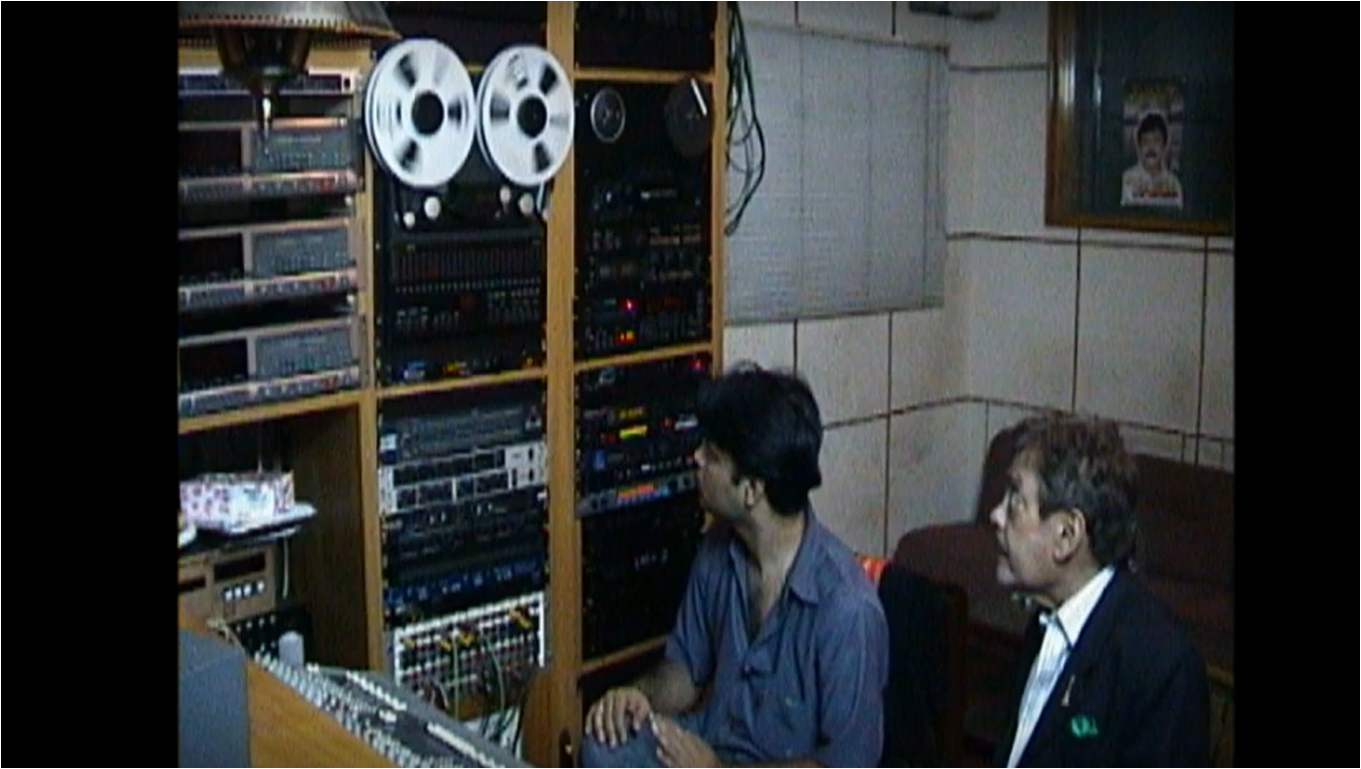
Moslehuddin producing a song in Lollywood

== Filmography ==
- Aadmi (1958)
- Rahguzar (1960) (producer: Zia Sarhadi)
- Humsafar (1960)
- Zamana Kya Kahega (1961) (producer: Iqbal Yusuf)
- Daal Mein Kaala (1962)
- Dil Ne Tujhe Maan Liya (1963)
- Yahudi Ki Larki (1963)
- Nehle Pe Dehla (1964)
- Joker (1966)
- Jaan Pehchan (1967)
- Mujhe Jeene Duo (1968)
- Mitti Ke Putlay (1974)

== Popular songs ==
- Magar Ae Haseena-e-Nazneen, Mujhe Tujh Se Koi Gila Nahin Sung by Saleem Raza
- Raat Saloni Aaee, Baat Anokhi Laaee Sung by Ahmed Rushdi and Nahid Niazi, lyrics by Fayyaz Hashmi
- Zindagi mein aik pal bhi chain aaye na.
- Aaj Iss Shehr Mein (film Joker) originally sung by Ahmad Rushdi.

== Awards and recognition ==
- Pride of Performance Award by the President of Pakistan in 1970
- Tamgha-e-Imtiaz (Medal of Excellence) Award by the Government of Pakistan in 1969
- Nigar Award as Best Music Director in film Hamsafar (1960)

== Death ==
He died of a heart attack in England on 6 August 2003.
