= Bahisht =

1974 film

- Urdu: بہشت
- Directed by: Hassan Tariq
- Screenplay by: Younis Rahi
- Story by: Riaz Shahid
- Produced by: Neelo (credited as Neelo Shahid)
- Starring: Nisho; Nadeem; Nayyar Sultana; Saiqa; Talish; Lehri; Afzaal Ahmad
- Music by: Rashid Attre; A. Hameed
- Production company: N.I. Productions
- Release date: 29 November 1974
- Country: Pakistan
- Language: Urdu

Bahisht is a 1974 Pakistani family drama film produced by Neelo and written by Riaz Shahid.

After the censorship that Yeh Aman (1971) faced, Shahid decided to come up with a more basic theme. The post-production work of the film started during the filming of Yeh Aman. During the film's production, Shahid was diagnosed with Cancer and died halfway leaving the film incomplete, and then the film was directed by Hassan Tariq.

The music of the film was composed by Rashid Attre and A. Hameed. A. Nayyar made his debut as a playback singer with this film.

The film won 4 Nigar Awards, including the 'Best Film' award for 1974.

== Plot ==
Khalid and Rehana come across each other in their college, where they fall for each other. After the usual bantering, they get married. Rehana who belongs to an upper-class family unlike Khalid, faces hurdles in the marriage created by Sarkar Maa (Khalid's mother). She compromises and tries to save her married life, until she loses her unborn due to her mother-in-law's cruel behaviour. After the incident, she decides to separate from Khalid and leaves him.

== Cast ==
- Nisho
- Nadeem
- Nayyar Sultana
- Talish
- Lehri
- Zamurrad
- Saiqa
- Aurangzeb
- Afzaal Ahmad

== Soundtrack ==
All lyrics are written by Riaz Shahid, Taslim Fazli; all music is composed by Rashid Attre, A. Hameed

Bahisht
| No. | Title | Lyrics | Music | Singer (s) | Length |
|---|---|---|---|---|---|
| 1. | "Ek Se Do Ho Jayen Ge" | | A. Hameed | Rubina Badar |
| 2. | "Mein Jo Shair Kabhi Hota" | | A. Hameed | Mehdi Hassan |
| 3. | "Naqab To Hataiye" | | A. Hameed | Naseem Begum, Ahmed Rushdi |
| 4. | "Yunhi Din Cut Jaye, Yunhi Sham Dhal Jaye" | | A. Hameed | Rubina Badar, A. Nayyar |
| 5. | "Kal Tak Jo Kehte Thay Apna, Aaj Wohi Begaanay Hain" | Riaz Shahid | A. Hameed | Noor Jehan |
| 6. | "Sitaro, Meri Rataun Ke Saharo" | | A. Hameed | Noor Jehan |
| 7. | "Hai Raat Raat Bhar Ki" | | A. Hameed | Noor Jehan, Mehdi Hassan |
| 8. | "Kyun Puchhte Ho, Kaya Tum Se Kahun" | | Rashid Attre | Mehdi Hassan |

== Release and reception ==
The film was released on 29 November 1974.

While reviewing positively, The Statesman said it as "Not a routine film", and praised the writing regarding the themes and staying close to the core plot.

== Awards ==
| Year | Award | Category | Awardee | Result | Ref. |
|---|---|---|---|---|---|
| —N/a | Nigar Awards | Best Film | N.I. Productions | Won | |
| —N/a | Nigar Awards | Best Scriptwriter | Riaz Shahid | Won | |
| —N/a | Nigar Awards | Best Screenplay | Riaz Shahid | Won | |
| —N/a | Nigar Awards | Best Supporting Actress | Nayyar Sultana | Won | |
