= Mukhra Chann Warga =

1969 film

- Directed by: Waheed Daar
- Produced by: M. A. Qazi
- Starring: Naghma; Habib; Rani; Yousuf Khan; M. Ismael; Munawar Zarif; Shahida; ChunChun; Mazhar Shah; Sawan
- Music by: Ghulam Ahmed Chishti
- Distributed by: Qazi Films
- Release date: 12 September 1969
- Country: Pakistan
- Language: Punjabi

Mukhra Chann Warga is a 1969 Punjabi-language Pakistani film.

== Cast ==
- Naghma
- Habib
- Rani
- Yousuf Khan
- M. Ismael
- Munawar Zarif
- Shahida
- ChunChun
- Mazhar Shah
- Sawan

== Music ==
The music was composed by Ghulam Ahmed Chishti. Famous playback singers of the time like Noor Jehan, Runa Laila, Masood Rana, Mala and Naseem Begum lent their voice to the songs.

- "Teri akh da nain jawab, bullian khirrian surkh Gulab, tohr jeeven wagda peya Chenab, te.." _ Masood Rana and Naseem Begum
- "Ban gaye phull gulab de ajj gorian banhwan..." - Noor Jehan
- "Satt Bismillah aayian noo, teinu wekhia te..." - Noor Jehan
- "Tera jehrri kurri te dil a, o main te nahin?" - Runa Laila
