= Saheli (film) =

1960 Pakistani Urdu film

- Urdu: سہیلی
- Directed by: S. M. Yusuf
- Screenplay by: Hasrat Lakhnavi
- Produced by: S. M. Yusuf; F. M. Sardar
- Starring: Nayyar Sultana; Shamim Ara; Darpan; Bahar; Aslam Pervaiz; Bibbo; Rakhshi
- Music by: A. Hameed
- Production company: FRY Movies
- Release date: 1960
- Country: Pakistan
- Language: Urdu

Saheli (lit. 'Friend' (Note: Saheli is an Urdu or Sanskrit word usually used to address a female's friend)) is a 1960 Pakistani Urdu language music blockbuster classical film directed by S. M. Yusuf and co-produced by F. M. Sardar.

It is written by Hasrat Lakhnavi while music is composed by A. Hameed. It features Nayyar Sultana, Shamim Ara and Darpan in the lead while supporting actors features Aslam Pervaiz along with others. It was screened in 2016 by the Lok Virsa Museum. Saheli is the first film of Yusuf to be made in the country after he migrated to Pakistan, and the 1960s first prominent film of Nayyar Sultana, Shamim Ara and Darpan, leading the film to celebrate its golden Jubilee.

Saheli won 5 Presidential awards and also became the recipient of four Nigar Awards, a film award in Pakistan presented by the Nigar magazine to recognise those who have made contributions to the cinema of Pakistan.

At the time of award ceremony, Shamim Ara refused to accept the Best Supporting Actress award, citing she played protagonist role while Nayyar Sultana appeared as supporting actress. Both actresses, according to the BBC Urdu, appeared in the lead. The publication also included it in the list of ten best films from Pakistan.

== Plot ==
Saheli revolves around cultural reforms when two friends Jamila and Razia argue about polygamous marriage. Both friends live and raised together in Rawalpindi. Razia trying to convince her friend Jamila by seeking her consent to marry her husband, supposed to be his second wife. She also makes efforts to convince her husband to marry her friend in an attempt to create a favourable environment for both of them so that they can live together after marrying the same person. Subsequently, Razia leaves for her relatives in Hyderabad after they called her there, and the two lives in solidarity as a result. When the two feels lonely, they begin miss each other and communicates via writing letters. When writing to Jamila, Razia always starts her letter with emotional opening phrase "mere pyare habib" (my dear beloved). When Jamila’s brother Aslam learns about their communication patterns, he intercept the letters and sometimes avoid to post or pass the letters to each other. The friends lost contact due to Jamila’s brother interception.

The eager to meet her friend leads Jamila to deliberately pretend to be an ill and requests the doctor to fake the situation asking her mother that the two should meet either sending Jamila to Razia or Razia should be called to her home. Following the faking illness, physician visits Jamila home where he falls in love with her and a marriage date is fixed as a result. On wedding day, the doctor dies in a car crash. Her family learns about an identical person. They rush to the hospital. The doctor's death leads Jamila to be experience distress event, and she suffers from psychological trauma. Her family admits her daughter in the same hospital in Karachi. After she opens her eyes in hospital, an identical person appears before her. She doesn't adequately differentiate the new doctor (psychological specialist) and the two marries. Her mother describes the incident to Razia, the whom latter visits her home and subsequently sings a song accordingly. She advises her husband to not reveal the truth, but one day doctor's servant explains the story to Razia's friend, leading her to know about her new husband. She speaks to Razia over phone in an attempt to make an apology for marrying the identical doctor unknowingly. While on the phone, she hears arguments between Jamila's brother and Razia when her brother enters in the room and threats to rape her friend. On hearing this, she subsequently arrives Razia's home with a weapon and kills her own brother.

== Cast ==
- Shamim Ara as Jamila
- Nayyar Sultana as Razia
- Darpan as two doctors (dual role)
- Aslam Pervaiz as Aslam, Jamila's brother
- Bahar Begum
- Agha Talish
- Nirala
- Faizi
- Sharara
- Hasrat Lakhnavi
- Salma Mumtaz as Jamila's mother
- G.N. Butt
- Bibbo
- Rakhshi
- Zamurrad
- Imdad Hussain
- (Guests: Lehri, Saqi, Ali Baba, Faizi, Sultan Rahi (extra actors))

== Soundtrack ==
All music is composed by A. Hameed

Saheli
No.	Title	Lyrics	Singer (s)	Length
1.	"Hum Ney Jo Phool Chuney, Dil Mein Chubhay Jaatein Hain"	Fayyaz Hashmi	Naseem Begum
2.	"Kaheen Do Dil Jo Mil Jatey, Bigadta Kya Zamane Ka"	Fayyaz Hashmi	Saleem Raza, Naseem Begum
3.	"Hum Bhool Gaey Har Baat, Magar Tera Pyaar Nahin Bhoolay"	Fayyaz Hashmi	Saleem Raza, Naseem Begum
4.	"Mukhray Peh Sehra Dalay, Aa Ja O Aanay Walay"	Fayyaz Hashmi	Naseem Begum and chorus
5.	"Saheli, Chun Le Apna Sathi"	Fayyaz Hashmi	Naseem Begum, Irene Perveen and chorus
6.	"Yeh Dunya Gol Mol Hai"	Fayyaz Hashmi	Fazal Hussain and chorus

== Release and box office ==
The film was released on 23 December 1960. It became golden jubilee hit of the year by completing 50 weeks in the Karachi circuit. It was also released in the International Film Festival of India in the following year.

== Awards ==
Year	Awards	Category	Awardee	Ref.
1960	Nigar Awards	Best director	S. M. Yusuf	
1960	Nigar Awards	Best actress	Nayyar Sultana	
1960	Nigar Awards	Best actor	Darpan	
1960	Nigar Awards	Best supporting actress	Shamim Ara	
1961	Presidential Award	Best Film	S. M. Yusuf and F. M. Sardar	
1961	Presidential Award	Best Director	S. M. Yusuf	
1961	Presidential Award	Best Actress	Shamim Ara	
1961	Presidential Award	Best Supporting Actress	Nayyar Sultana	
1961	Presidential Award	Best Supporting Actor	Talish	
