= Nayyar Sultana =

Pakistani film actress

- نیر سلطانہ
- Nayyar Sultana in 1963 film Baji
- Born: Tayyaba Bano; 4 March 1932; Aligarh, United Provinces, British India
- Died: 27 October 1992 (aged 60); Karachi, Sindh, Pakistan
- Other names: Malka-i-Jazbaat (Queen of Sentiments); Queen of Emotions
- Education: Aligarh Muslim University
- Occupation: Actress
- Years active: 1955 – 1992
- Spouse: Darpan (m. 1962; died 1980)
- Children: Qaisar Abbas (son); Ali Abbas (son)
- Relatives: Santosh Kumar (brother-in-law); Mansoor (brother-in-law); S. Suleman (brother-in-law)
- Awards: Nigar Awards in 1957, 1960, 1962, 1974 and 1994

Nayyar Sultana (born Tayyaba Bano; 4 March 1932 – 27 October 1992), known as Malka-i-Jazbaat (Queen of Sentiments) and Queen of Emotions, was a Pakistani film actress. She became one of the foremost screen actresses of Lollywood in the 1950s and 1960s.

== Early life ==
Nayyar Sultana was born Tayyaba Bano in Aligarh (British India) on 4 March 1932 (as per Pakmag website) to a Muslim family. She had her education in Women's College, Aligarh. Her family migrated to Karachi, after the independence of Pakistan in 1954.

== Career ==
Sultana's parents were related to actress Shamim Bano, the wife of famous Pakistani film producer and director Anwar Kamal Pasha, who cast her in his directorial Qatil in 1955 in a supporting role with the screen name Nazli, marking her acting debut. Later the same year, she landed the second lead in Humayun Mirza's Intikhab. Thereafter, she appeared with the screen name of Nayyar Sultana. She came into prominence in 1957 with Jaffar Malik's Saat Lakh, where she portrayed a tawaif opposite Santosh Kumar, and earned a Nigar Award for best supporting actress for her performance. S. M. Yusuf's Saheli in 1960 proved her greatest success till that point. The film celebrated its golden jubilee on the box office and Sultana's portrayal of a loving wife and a selfless friend earned her another Nigar Award for Best Actress. In 1962, she played a newlywed bride who elopes soon after her marriage in Khawaja Khurshid Anwar's Ghunghat. A reviewer from the Outlook found her performance as "indifferent but tolerable". She played the titular role in younger brother-in-law S. Suleman's directed Baaji (1963) opposite husband Darpan and earned praise for the portrayal of a young frustrated widow. While reviewing Baaji (1963), Herald called her performance "the strongest element of the film".

She briefly left the industry after her marriage with Darpan. With her portrayal of a blind country girl in Ek Musafir Ek Haseena, released in 1968, she made a comeback to the films, but it couldn't push her career further as most of her films at that time like Meri Bhabhi (1969), Hamjoli (1970) and Azmat (1973) were not commercially successful at the box office.

In the 1970s, she moved to performing character roles in S. Suleman's Abhi To Main Jawan Hoon and two films by Hassan Tariq, Mazi Haal Mustaqbil and Seeta Maryam Margaret. These were her last critically acclaimed films before she gradually faded away from the screen. After the death of her husband Darpan in 1980, Sultana appeared in a handful of films and managed his recruiting agency till her own death a decade later. Sultana had worked in over 225 films during her 37-year film career and received a number of awards. She was known for performing tragic roles.

== Personal life ==
She married Darpan, her co-star and one of the foremost romantic heroes in Pakistani film industry, at the pinnacle of her movie career and had two sons Qaisar and Ali. Darpan's elder brother Santosh Kumar was also an actor, and another brother, S. Suleman, was a film director.

Sultana owned a travel agency called "Darpan International".

== Illness and death ==
Nayyar Sultana died of cancer on 27 October 1992 at Aga Khan Hospital in Karachi, Pakistan.

== Artistry and legacy ==
Through her on-screen portrayals, Sultana contributed to the development of profound and prudent women characters in Pakistani cinema during the 1960s.

== Filmography ==
=== Television shows ===
Year	Title	Role	Notes
1992	Yes Sir, No Sir	Herself	PTV

=== Films ===
Year	Title	Role	Notes
1955	Qatil		
1955	Intekhab		
1957	Saat Lakh		
1958	Dil Mein Tu		
1958	Mukhra		
1958	Touheed		
1958	Akhri Dao		
1958	Aadmi		
1959	Bacha Jamoora		
1959	Lalkar		
1959	Mazloom		
1960	Rahguzar		
1960	Behrupiya		
1960	Aik Thi Maa		
1960	Ayaz		
1960	Khaibar Mail		
1960	Daku Ki Ladki		
1960	Saheli	Razia	
1961	Surayya	Surayya	
1961	Son of Ali Baba		
1961	Bombay Wala		
1961	Gulfarosh		
1961	3 Phool		
1962	Aulad		
1962	Mehtab		
1962	Ghunghat	Naheed / Usha Rani	
1962	Barsat Mein		
1962	Shake Hand		
1963	Baghawat		
1963	Maa kay Aansoo		
1963	Yahudi Ki Ladki		
1963	Baaji	Farzana / Baaji	
1963	Dulhan	Shabnum	
1963	Tangay Wala		
1963	Aurat Ek Kahani		
1965	Devdas	Chandramukhi	
1968	Nadir Khan		
1968	Aik Musafar Aik Haseena		
1969	Saza		
1970	Chann Sajna		
1972	Farz Aur Mohabbat		
1972	Jagde Rehna		
1972	Umrao Jaan Ada	Khanam	
1973	Khuda Te Maa		
1974	Bahisht	Sarkar Maa	
1974	Dillagi	Baji	
1975	Pehchan	Fakirni	Guest appearance
1975	Sheeda Pastol		
1975	Aik Gunnah Aur Sahi		
1976	Chitra Tay Shera		
1976	Badtameez		
1977	Naya Suraj		
1978	Kora Kaghaz		
1979	Khushboo		
1980	Smuggler		
1980	Aag Aur Sholay		
1982	Ek Din Bahu Ka	Malika Aliya	
1983	Sher Mama	Sabara	
1983	Wadda Khan		
1984	Miss Colombo		
1989	Shaani		
1994	Sarkata Insaan		Posthumous release

== Awards and recognition ==
Year	Award	Category	Result	Title	Ref.
1957	Nigar Award	Best Supporting Actress	Won	Saat Lakh	
1960	Nigar Award	Best Actress	Won	Saheli	
1962	Nigar Award	Best Actress	Won	Aulad	
1974	Nigar Award	Best Supporting Actress	Won	Bahisht	
1994	Nigar Award	Best Supporting Actress	Won	Sarkata Insaan	

== See also ==
- List of Pakistani actresses
