= Aaina (1944 film) =

1944 film

- Directed by: S. M. Yusuf
- Produced by: R. D. Productions
- Starring: Trilok Kapoor; Kaushalya; Yakub; Husn Banu
- Music by: Gulshan Sufi; Fateh Ali Khan
- Release date: 1944
- Country: India
- Language: Hindi

Aaina is a 1944 Hindi language Bollywood film. It was released in 1944.

The film is directed by S. M. Yusuf. It is notable for its exploration of social issues through its compelling narrative, set during the formative years of Indian cinema in the 1940s. The film features a memorable soundtrack composed by Gulshan Sufi and Fateh Ali Khan, with the popular song "Balamji Ye Kya Jadoo Dala" performed by Zohrabai Ambalewali and Gope.

== Plot ==
The plot of Aaina revolves around a young woman, played by Mumtaz Shanti, who finds herself caught between love and familial duty. As she is forced to make difficult decisions, the film explores deep emotional themes such as sacrifice and personal turmoil. Her romantic relationship is tested by the societal expectations and constraints placed on her.

The film delves deeply into the emotional struggles of the protagonist, who must navigate these personal conflicts and make life-changing decisions As the narrative unfolds, the central character’s inner turmoil intensifies, highlighting themes of personal sacrifice, loyalty, and the constraints of societal norms.

The story also emphasizes the moral dilemmas of the time, illustrating how personal desires often clash with societal responsibilities. The film's portrayal of the emotional stakes of its characters has earned it recognition for its depth and realism in the portrayal of social issues.

== Music ==
The soundtrack of Aaina was composed by Gulshan Sufi and Fateh Ali Khan, two prominent figures in 1940s Bollywood music. The film's music is remembered for its catchy and impactful songs, particularly the song "Balamji Ye Kya Jadoo Dala", performed by Zohrabai Ambalewali and Gope.

== Legacy ==
'Aaina' is still remembered in the annals of Indian cinema for its strong narrative, emotional performances, and unforgettable music. Over time, it has been recognized as a classic film that captured the essence of 1940s Bollywood. Many modern-day film critics and historians refer to this film for its unique portrayal of love and sacrifice, which influenced later works in Indian cinema.

== Cast ==
The cast of the film:

- Trilok Kapoor
- Kaushalya
- Yakub
- Husn Banu
- Sulochana Chatterjee
- Rajkumari Shukla
- Yashodhara Katju
