= List of Pakistani film directors =

This is a list of Pakistani film directors.

== A ==
- Jawad Ahmad
- W.Z. Ahmed
- M. Akram
- Mohammad Ali
- Sajjad Ali
- Khawaja Khurshid Anwar
- Shamim Ara
- Ammar Aziz

== B ==
- Nadeem Baig
- Ahmad Bashir
- Syed Faisal Bukhari

== C ==
- Nadeem Cheema

== D ==
- Imtiaz Dharker
- Momina Duraid

== E ==
- Mohammed Ehteshamuddin

== G ==
- Mushtaq Gazdar
- Ajab Gul
- Rahim Gul
- Sajjad Gul

== H ==
- Haissam Hussain
- Haseeb Hassan

== I ==
- Alizeh Imtiaz

== J ==
- Javed Jabbar
- Mehreen Jabbar
- Yasir Jaswal
- Azfar Jafri
- Noor Jehan
- Ismail Jilani
- Aziz Jindani

== K ==
- Zarrar Kahn
- Pervaiz Kaleem
- Syed Kamal
- Ilyas Kashmiri
- Shahzad Kashmiri
- Rauf Khalid
- Khalique Ibrahim Khalique
- Nazir Ahmed Khan
- Reema Khan
- Uzair Zaheer Khan
- Sarmad Khoosat

== L ==
- Bilal Lashari
- Mubashir Lucman

== M ==
- Pervez Malik
- Shoaib Mansoor
- Saqib Mausoof
- Samar Minallah
- Jan Mohammad
- Salma Mumtaz
- Badar Munir
- Waheed Murad

== N ==
- Farjad Nabi
- Nannha
- Afia Nathaniel
- Yasir Nawaz
- Zarqa Nawaz
- Nazar-ul-Islam
- Syed Noor

== O ==
- Sharmeen Obaid-Chinoy

== P ==
- Anwar Kamal Pasha
- Samina Peerzada
- Usman Peerzada

== Q ==
- Khalil-ur-Rehman Qamar
- Mustafa Qureshi
- Nabeel Qureshi

== R ==
- Shehzad Rafiq
- Hassan Rana
- Rangeela
- Saeed Khan Rangeela
- Asim Raza
- Javed Raza
- Jarrar Rizvi
- Saeed Rizvi
- Shaukat Hussain Rizvi

== S ==
- Sangeeta
- Adnan Sarwar
- Riaz Shahid
- Shaan Shahid
- Umer Sharif
- Anjum Shahzad
- Javed Sheikh
- Sudhir
- Sabiha Sumar

== T ==
- Hassan Tariq

== W ==
- Wajahat Rauf

== Z ==
- Maheen Zia

== See also ==
- List of Pakistani television and theatre directors
