= Baaji (1963 film) =

1963 film

- Original title: باجی
- Directed by: S. Suleman
- Screenplay by: Anwar Batalvi
- Story by: Anwar Batalvi
- Produced by: Azizullah Hassan
- Starring: Nayyar Sultana; Darpan; Zeba; Lehri; Agha Talish; Bibbo; Zareen Panna
- Music by: Saleem Iqbal
- Production company: Javedaan Productions
- Release date: 3 May 1963 (Pakistan)
- Country: Pakistan
- Language: Urdu

Baaji is a 1963 Pakistani musical romance film directed by S. Suleman. It was based on a story by Anwar Batalvi who co-wrote the screenplay with Ahmed Rahi, and produced by Hafeezullah Hasan. The film features Nayyar Sultana in the title role with Darpan, Zeba, Agha Talish and Lehri in pivotal roles. The music of the film's soundtrack was composed by Saleem Iqbal. Baaji depicts the frustrations of a lonely young widow.

The film didn't perform well at the box office but received appreciable reviews, primarily due to Sultana's performance. In 2018, the film was selected to screen at Lok Virsa Museum. It received 5 awards at 1963 Nigar Awards, including Best film.

== Plot ==
Farzana a.k.a. 'Fari', commonly known as Baaji in her circle of friends, is a young widow. She lives with some of her servants in a bungalow. Baaji lives a lonely life and has no family members living with her. One day, her cousin Nasir comes to meet her and she discovers that he lives nearby with a friend for his work assignment. Nasir then meets Seemi, daughter of Baaji's servant. They both fall for each other and decide to marry. Nasir returns home to bring his mother to send his proposal of marriage. When Baaji initially thinks that his mother is visiting to propose a marriage between Nasir and Baaji. But when she arrives, she requests her to take Naisr's proposal to Seemi's parents. Baaji is shocked to hear it but controls herself and decides to arrange their marriage. After their marriage is settled, Baaji's health deteriorates and she is admitted to a hospital. In the hospital, one of Baaji's servants Zeenat tells Nasir that he is responsible for Baaji's condition because his friendly and caring behaviour towards her weighs on her. He then decides to call off the marriage and refuses to marry Seemi but agrees later when Baaji insists upon it. In this way, Nasir and Seemi get married but Baaji dies sitting on the bench in her house's garden.

== Cast ==
- Nayyar Sultana as Farzana “Fari”, Baaji
- Darpan as Nasir
- Zeba as Seemi
- Salma Mumtaz as Seemi's mother
- Bibbo as Naisr's mother
- Lehri as Shahid
- Naeema Garaj as Zeenat
- Agha Talish
- Zareen Panna
- Amy Minwalla
- Nazar
- Yasmin as Guest (cameo appearance)
- Ejaz as Guest (cameo appearance)
- Noor Jehan as Guest (cameo; appearance in song "Sajjan Lagi Tori")
- Habib as Guest (cameo; appearance in song "Sajjan Lagi Tori")
- Sabiha Khanum as Guest (cameo; appearance in song "Sajjan Lagi Tori")
- Santosh Kumar as Guest (cameo; appearance in song "Sajjan Lagi Tori")
- Waheed Murad as Visiter (cameo; appearance in song "Sajjan Lagi Tori")
- Sultan Rahi as Visiter (cameo; appearance in song "Sajjan Lagi Tori")

== Soundtrack ==
All lyrics of the songs were written by Ahmad Rahi while music was composed by Saleem Iqbal.

The film features a classical number Sajjan Lagi Tori Lagan Mun Maa by Noor Jehan and Farida Khanum, on which classical dance was performed by Zareen Panna and Emi Menuwala. Indian tabla player Usataad Allah Rakha provide the rhythmic support to the dance and song. The song also features a number of cameos including, Noor Jehan, Sabiha Khanum, Santosh Kumar, Ejaz, Yasmin, Waheed Murad, Habib, Nazar and Sultan Rahi.

=== Track listing ===
- Dil Ke Afsanay, Nigahon Ki Zuban Tak Pohanche sung by Noor Jehan
- Chanda Tori Chandani Mein sung by Naseem Begum
- Sanwariya, Ne Haye Diya Bara Dukh Denu by Naseem Begum
- Ab Yahan Koi Nahi, Koi Nahi Aaye Ga sung by Noor Jehan
- Saaf Chhuptay Bhi Nahi, Samnay Aate Bhi Nahi by Saleem Raza
- Sajjan Lagi Tori Lagan Mun Maa sung by Noor Jehan and Farida Khanum
- Aa, Aa, Aa, Kon Kut Bhei Laaj Mohay Aye by Salamat Ali Khan and Nazakat Ali Khan

== Reception ==
=== Critical reception ===
While praising the Sultana's performance, The Illustrated Weekly of Pakistan wrote, "Nayyar was, however, at her best in Baaji. Playing the role of a love - starved woman, whose exterior conceals her frustrations and unfulfilled desires, Nayyar lent grace and dignity to the character assigned to her."

In a review by Herald, the reviewer stated her performance as the strongest element of the film. The journal also praised the dialogues, and stated the film as the best of Suleman's career.

The Outlook reviewing the film miscellaneously stating, "Likewise, half of ‘𝘉𝘢𝘢𝘫𝘪’ is devoted to getting it to us that the ‘𝘉𝘢𝘢𝘫𝘪’ in question—Nayyar again—is pathetically inhumane."

== Awards and nominations ==
Year	Award	Category	Awardee	Result	Ref.
1963	Nigar Awards	Best Film	Azizullah Hassan	Won	
1963	Nigar Awards	Best Scriptwriter	Anwat Batalvi	Won	
1963	Nigar Awards	Best Playback Singer (Female)	Naseem Begum	Won	
1963	Nigar Awards	Best Editing	Hameed Chaudhry	Won	
1963	Nigar Awards	Best Sound	Taj Malik	Won	

== Legacy ==
Baaji topped the critics' poll of "Top Ten Pakistani Films" conducted by British Film Institute in 2002. When asked by Cinemaya, critic Aijaz Gul named the film among the "Top Ten Films" of Pakistani cinema.

The film's title was chosen by the director Saqib Malik to name his film Baaji.
