= Amy Minwalla =

Pakistan dancer and film actress

- ایمی منوالا
- Born: Karachi, Pakistan
- Occupations: Actress; Dancer
- Years active: 1955 – 1971

Amy Minwalla is a Pakistani actress and dancer. She was primarily active in the Urdu and Punjabi film industry during the 1960s and is known for her kathak and classical dances in many Pakistani films.

== Early life ==
Minwalla was born into a Parsi family in Karachi, Pakistan and practices the religion Zoroastrianism. She came from a musical family with tawaif background. She studied art under her parents' guidance from a young age and received professional Kathak dance training.

== Career ==
Amy Minwalla made her screen debut in 1955 from Punjabi-language film Sohni (1955 film) directed by M. J. Rana. She was active in the Pakistani film industry for about 20 years (1950s - 1970s) as a notable supporting actress and dancer and was frequently invited to perform dances at important social events. Her dances were considered very popular among the Pakistani cinemagoers and a necessary ingredient of many Pakistani films. Minwalla once performed ballet with international dancers at Metropole Hotel in Karachi.

== Personal life ==
Minwalla married Pakistani film director Hassan Tariq, with whom she had a daughter. They later divorced.

Her cousin Kanga Asheville is also an actress and dancer.

== Filmography ==
Year	Film
1955	Sohni
1959	Faisala
1959	Savera
1959	Gumrah
1960	Gharib
1960	Bhabhi
1960	Shehzadi
1960	2 Ustad
1960	Shehbaz
1960	Mitti Dian Moortan
1960	Daku Ki Larki
1960	Neelofar
1960	Laggan
1961	Chhotay Sarkar
1961	Farishta
1961	Sunehray Sapnay
1961	Mangol
1961	Ghazi Bin Abbas
1961	2 Rastay
1962	Shaheed
1962	Darwaza
1962	Azra
1962	Husn-o-Ishq
1962	Chodhary
1962	Ajnabi
1962	Dosheeza
1962	Unchay Mahal
1962	Barsat Mein
1963	Ishq Par Zor Nahin
1963	3 & 3
1963	Shikva
1963	Yahudi Ki Larki
1963	Baaji
1963	Nateeja
1963	Teer Andaz
1963	Kala Aadmi
1963	Seema
1963	Qatal Kay Baad
1964	Lutera
1964	Mamta
1964	Pyar Na Kar Nadaan
1964	Gehra Dagh
1964	Jhalak
1964	Andhi Mohabbat
1964	Vah Bei Vah
1964	Sher Di Bachi
1964	Hath Jori
1965	Doctor
1965	Kalay Log
1965	1000 Dastan
1965	Mujahid
1965	Ham Matvalay Nojavan
1965	Kaneez
1966	Taqdeer
1968	Pakeeza
1970	Darinda
1971	Roop Behroop
