= Kaneez (1965 film) =

1965 Pakistani film

- Film poster of Kaneez
- Directed by: Hassan Tariq
- Written by: Ali Sufiyan Afaqi
- Produced by: Hassan Tariq; Ali Sufiyan Afaqi
- Starring: Waheed Murad; Zeba; Mohammad Ali; Sabiha Khanum; Lehri; Santosh Kumar; Adeeb; Talish; Nabeela; Saqi; Aslam Pervaiz; S. Suleman; Ahmad Rushdi
- Cinematography: Kamran Mirza
- Edited by: Asghar
- Music by: Khalil Ahmed
- Release date: 26 November 1965
- Running time: approx. 3 hours
- Country: Pakistan
- Language: Urdu

Kaneez is a 1965 Pakistani Urdu black-and-white film directed by Hassan Tariq, who co-produced it with Ali Sufiyan Afaqi. Afaqi also wrote the screenplay. The cast includes Waheed Murad, Zeba, Mohammad Ali, Sabiha Khanum, Lehri, Saqi, Adeeb and Talish. The film revolves around a family having high traditions.

A golden jubilee hit film of the year, it won 5 Nigar Awards at the annual ceremony.

== Cast ==
- Zeba
- Waheed Murad
- Mohammad Ali
- Sabiha Khanum
- Talish
- Lehri
- Adeeb
- Amy Minwalla
- Gotam
- Imdad Hussain
- Saqi
- Khatana
- Nabeela
- Pappu
- Billu
- (Guest appearances: Santosh Kumar, Aslam Pervaiz, Sabira Sultana, Nasira, Faizi, A. Shah, S. Suleman, Ahmad Rushdi)

== Release ==
Kaneez was released on 26 November 1965 in Pakistani cinemas. The film completed 16 weeks on Naz Cinema and 50 weeks on other cinemas of Karachi and, thus, became a Golden Jubilee film.

== Music ==
The music of the film was composed by Khalil Ahmed and Tasadduq Hussain and the songs were written by Himayat Ali Shair and Agha Hashar Kashmiri. Playback singers were Ahmed Rushdi, Mala, Naseem Begum and Masood Rana. A list of the songs of the film is as follows:

- Jab raat dhali... by Ahmed Rushdi and Mala
- Ghair ki baton ka akhir aitbaar aahee gaya... sung by Naseem Begum, written by Agha Hashar Kashmiri. This ghazal song became a super-hit.
- Pyar mein hum aye jaan-e-tamanna... by Ahmed Rushdi
- Aag hai dono tarf barabar lagi hui... by Ahmed Rushdi
- Tujhe haqeer samjhati rahe gi yeh duniya... by Masood Rana

== Awards ==
Kaneez won 5 Nigar Awards in the following categories:

| Category | Recipient |
|---|---|
| Best actor | Mohammad Ali |
| Best screenplay | Ali Sufiyan Afaqi |
| Best supporting actor | Talish |
| Best editing | Asghar |
| Best comedian | Lehri |
