= Dulhan (1963 film) =

- دلہن
- Directed by: S. M. Yusuf
- Written by: Hasrat Lakhnavi
- Starring: Shamim Ara; Darpan; Nayyar Sultana; Lehri; Nabeela; Salma Mumtaz; Habib; Rehana; Bibbo
- Cinematography: Babar Bilal
- Music by: Rashid Attre
- Production company: Eveready Pictures
- Release date: 1 November 1963
- Country: Pakistan
- Language: Urdu

Dulhan is a 1963 Urdu Pakistani film directed by S. M. Yusuf and produced by J.C. Anand under Eveready Pictures. The lead cast of the film include Shamim Ara, Darpan, Nayyar Sultana, Nabeela and Habib. The music of the film was composed by Rashid Attre. It was released on 1 November 1963 and was a flop at the box office.

== Plot ==
Zafar and Najma want to marry but Zafar's father fixes his marriage with another girl. He agrees to do so because of his father's deteriorated condition. On the wedding night, when he is on a voyage with his bride, a storm causes many people to go missing and some die. At that moment, Zafar's bride changes as both of them had not seen their partners before. The girl with Zafar (apparently his bride) is revealed to be Shabnum and was married to a friend of her brother.

Zafar tells no one about this mishap and even Shabnum doesn't realize it. When Najma feels heartbroken upon learning that Zafar has married. When Shabnum realises that the person she is living with is not her husband, she escapes from his house and meets with an accident on the road. The woman in the car takes her to hospital where Zafar also comes to find her. She states that her name is Mumtaz so that he couldn't access to her. The woman takes her to her house where she lives with her son who is a doctor۔ In her house, it revealed on Shabnum that her son is the same person whom she married. She doesn't disclose this because she thinks that no one would accept her after living with an unknown person and everyone will inquire the proof of chastity. She lives there as Mumtaz and one day, her brother comes there after being blinded by the storm. Pervaiz operates on him, restoring his sight.

Najma becomes ill due to heartbreak and Dr. Pevaiz comes for her checkup regularly. Due to an understanding between them, their mothers decide to fix their marriage to which they both deny but later agree due to constant pressure.

When Pervaiz sees her sister Shabnum, she tells her story to him. Dr. Pervaiz who stands near says that she needs no proof. Najma flees from the wedding but when she reaches home, Zafar who comes there to prove Shabnum's innocence marries Najma.

== Cast ==
- Shamim Ara
- Darpan
- Nayyar Sultana
- Habib
- Nabeela
- Lehri
- Nasira
- Salma Mumtaz
- Rehana
- Bibbo

== Music ==
The music was composed by Rashid Attre and all lyrics of the songs were written by Fayyaz Hashmi, Nakhshab and Aziz Kashmiri.

- Mujh Se Mat Pooch Mere Dil Ki Tamanna Kya Hai by Saleem Raza and Naheed Niazi
- Bari Mushkil Se Nigahain Uthi Hain by Noor Jehan
- Chhannak Chhannak, Meri Jhanjhar Chhanke by Saleem Raza, Naseem Begum and co.
- Jan-e-Man, Jan-e-Man, Yeh Khat Nahi by Irene Perveen and Mala Begum

== Release and box office ==
Dulhan was released on 1 November 1963 and did not reach the silver jubilee status, and is thus considered a flop.

== Reception ==
The Illustrated Weekly of Pakistan opined that the film is "based on a good story idea which has not been properly delineated on the screen."
