= Eid Mubarak (film) =

1965 Pakistani film

- Directed by: S. M. Yusuf
- Screenplay by: S. M. Yusuf
- Story by: Fayyaz Hashmi
- Starring: Waheed Murad; Zeba; Habib; Rukhsama; Sabira Sultana; Kamal Irani; Seema Begum; Nirala; Adeeb
- Cinematography: Mehboob Ali
- Music by: A. Hameed
- Production companies: F&Y Movies
- Release date: 2 July 1965
- Running time: ~135 minutes
- Country: Pakistan
- Language: Urdu

Eid Mubarak is a 1965 Pakistani muslim social directed by S. M. Yusuf, who co-produced it and also wrote the screenplay for the film, based on a story written by Fayyaz Hashmi. The film explores the themes of love, brotherhood, and respect within a middle-class family during Eid celebrations, marking it a pioneering work in the genre of Muslim Social in Lollywood.

It features Waheed Murad, Zeba, Habib and Rukhsana in leading roles. The film featured songs performed by Mala, Ahmed Rushdi, and Munir Hussain, with music composition by A. Hameed. The film also included a Naat, Reham Karo Ya Shah-e-Do Aalam, performed by Mala. The film performed well at the box office and was a silver jublee hit. It won a Nigar Award for Best sound editing.

== Plot ==
The plot revolves around the Eid festival and mutual love, brotherhood and mutual respect among the characters of a family after mutual suspicions.

The story revolves around a household where an elder brother lives with his younger siblings (a sister and a brother) as their parents have died. The elder brother, Azeem wants to marry one of his siblings and Tahira who is the daughter of Azeem's phuppo (parental aunt) likes him and wants to marry him. On the day of Eid-ul-Fitr, he learns that his brother Nadeem loves Naheed when he goes to her house. Naheed's father fist taunts Azeem because of his poverty but later, not only agrees for their marriage but also promises to marry his sister, Tahira, with a doctor he knows.

On Eid day, Tahira becomes victim of an accident which injures her leg and she starts to walk on crutches. Due to her lameness, the groom's family denies to marry her while Nadeem and Naheed get married. After the wedding, Azeem and Nadeem advise Naheed to take special care of Tahira.

One day, Azeem and Nadeem scold Naheed as they misunderstand that she doesn't take care of Tahira which upsets Naheed so much that she starts to hate Jameel's siblings. Another day, Anna Bi (Naheed's servant) knocks Tahira down unknowingly that she would fall. Azeem sees it all and blames Anna Bi which Nadeem furiously denies and slaps Tahira. Nadeem becomes distant from his siblings and does not embrace his brother after prayer of Eid-ul-Azha and then leaves for Naheed's father's house along with her. Zahida also shifts to the city with her mother due to her job, leaving Naheed and Azeem alone.

Naheed's father arranges a party and invites Azeem and Tahira also, who come but later leave when Naheed insults them. The party is arranged to announce that all of Naheed's father business and property will be inherited by Nadeem. At this party, her father's secretary arrives with police who arrest her father as he owns a business of counterfeit drugs. Police is about to arrest the secretary as well because he was equally involved in this unlawful evil act but he escapes and shoots Naheed's father and himself is shot by police. Nadeem is then arrested by police due to his father-in-law's crime and Naheed is left alone. Azeem and Tahira have a road accident and Tahira becomes lost when she seeks a doctor. As Tahira also doesn't find her brother, so she takes shelter at the doctor's house. She goes to 'mailad' in doctor's neighborhood which was actually arranged by Zahid, who lives with her mother and has also brought Naheed to her as she was alone. Azeem goes to police station to report about her sister and meets with Nadeem there. He comes home with Nadeem and finds Tahira too. Nadeem needs some money for Nadeem's bail which he takes from his uncle who has not inherited his father's property to his siblings. Nadeem is released from jail and Azeem marries Zahida while the doctor marries Tahira as he feels that he has done wrong with Tahira.

== Cast ==
- Waheed Murad as Nadeem
- Zeba as Naheed
- Habib as Azeem
- Rukhsana as Tahira
- Iqbal Yusuf
- Nirala
- Seema Begum
- Kamal Irani
- Faizi
- Adeeb
- Sabira Sultana

== Soundtrack ==
All lyrics are written by Fayyaz Hashmi; all music is composed by A. Hameed.

Eid Mubarak
| No. | Title | Singer (s) | Length |
|---|---|---|---|
| 1. | "Hum ko duaen do, Tumhein qatil bana diya" | Munir Hussain |
| 2. | "Khuda ki qasam bari jach rahi ho" | Mala |
| 3. | "Taqdeer hans rahi thi" | Mala |
| 4. | "Meri guriya ka hai jalwa nirala" | Ahmad Rushdi |
| 5. | "O lampak shampak shampak shoo" | Ahmad Rushdi, Munir Hussain & others |
| 6. | "Reham karo ya shah-e-do-aalam" | Mala |

== Release and response ==
Eid Mubarak was released on 2 July 1965. The film ran for 18 weeks in the cinemas of Karachi and was a Silver Jubilee hit.

== Awards ==
| Year | Ceremony | Category | Recipient | Ref. |
|---|---|---|---|---|
| 1965 | Nigar Awards | Best Sound Editing | Hashim Quraishi | |
