= Ghulam Abbas (singer) =

Pakistani film and television singer

Ghulam Abbas غلام عباس
- Classical Singer Ghulam Abbas
- Born: 1 January 1955 (age 71); Jhang, Punjab, Pakistan
- Occupation: Singer
- Years active: 1975 – present
- Known for: Film playback / Classical music singing
- Awards: Pride of Performance (2020); Tamgha-i-Imtiaz (2011); 4 'Best Singer' Nigar Awards

Ghulam Abbas (born 1 January 1955) is a Pakistani radio, television, and film singer. He is known for his ghazals, geets, and playback singing for Urdu and Punjabi movies. Besides winning 4 Nigar Awards as a playback singer, he was also honored with the Tamgha-i-Imtiaz (Medal of Excellence) in 2011 and the Pride of Performance Award in 2020 by the President of Pakistan.

== Early life and education ==
Ghulam Abbas was born on 1 January 1955, in Jhang, Punjab, Pakistan. He got his school education in Multan. His higher education includes master's degrees in Philosophy and Urdu literature.

== Singing career ==
Playback singer Mehdi Hassan noticed this young boy and introduced him to his mentor Ismail Khan. Abbas got an advanced classical training in singing from him.

Ghulam Abbas started his playback singing career with a Punjabi film "Aashiq Loag Soudai" in 1975. His first breakthrough was a song in the film "Ajnabi" (1975), under the musical direction of Nisar Bazmi. The song was "Wo aa to jaye magar intezar hi kam hai" and its popularity established him as a playback singer. Then musician Robin Ghosh gave him a career-boosting song, "Aise wo sharmaye jaise megha chaye" for movie "Do Saathi" (1975). From there on, Abbas gave voice to 129 songs in 120 films.

Apart from playback singing for movies, Abbas also sang many ghazals, semi-classical songs, and national songs for Radio Pakistan and Pakistan Television. His ghazal "Main ne roka bhi nahin aur wo thehra bhi nahin" won the award of having most broadcasts on Radio Pakistan.

== Film songs ==
Some hit songs of Ghulam Abbas are:

- 1975 (Film: Ajnabi): Woh Aa To Jaye Magar, Mera Intezar Hi Kam Hay, Music: Nisar Bazmi
- 1975 (Film: Do Sathi): Aisay Woh Sharmaye, Jaisay Megha Chhaye, Music: Robin Ghosh
- 1976 (Film: Deevar): Deewana Kahin Tum Ko Na, Deevana Bana Day, Music: M. Ashraf
- 1977 (Film: Aashi): Jan-e-Tamanna, Kab Tak Tum Na, Pyar Mera Pehchano Gay, Music: Nazir Ali
- 1978 (Film: Mehman): Dekh Kar Tujh Ko، Main Gham Dil Kay Bhula Deta Hun, Music: M. Ashraf
- 1978 (Film: Mazi, Haal, Mustaqbil): Zindagi Tu Nay Har Qadm Peh Mujhay, Ek Sapna Neya Dikhaya Hay, Music: A. Hameed
- 1978 (Film: Awaz): Hari Bhari Abadian, Geet Gati Wadian, Music: A. Hameed
- 1978 (Film: Intekhab): Ham Na Tarsen Kabhi Phir Khushi Kay Liye, Music: Nisar Bazmi
- 1979 (Film: Pakeeza): Mil Jata Hay Yaar Magar Pyar Nahin Milta, Music: M. Ashraf
- 1984 (Film: Bobby): Ik Bar Milo Ham Say To So Bar Milayn Gay, Music: Amjad Bobby
- 1995 (Film: Jo Darr Gya Woh Marr Gya): Tu Hai Dil Ki Dharkan, Music: Robin Ghosh
- 2003 (Film: Shararat): Tu Hay Chand Raat, Music: Wajahat Attre

== Classical songs / Ghazals ==
- Main ne roka bhi nahin aur wo thhehra bhi nahin, Poet: Aslam Ansari
- Khudi Ka Sir'r-e-Nehan La Ilaha Illallah, Poet: Allama Muhammad Iqbal
- Aye Pak watan Aye Pak Zameen, Poet: ?
- Mil ke bichar gaya, Poet: Adeen Taji

== Awards and recognition ==
Year	Award	Category	Result	Film	Ref.
1978	Nigar Award	Best playback male singer	Won	Mazi Haal Mustaqbil	
1981	Nigar Award	Best playback male singer	Won	Qurbani	
1993	Nigar Award	Best playback male singer	Won	Insaniyat	
1994	Nigar Award	Best playback male singer	Won	Rani Beti Raaj Karay Gee	
2011	Tamgha-i-Imtiaz	Arts	Won	–	
2020	Pride of Performance	Arts	Won	–	
