= Aulad (1962 film) =

1962 film

Aulaad
- Directed by: S. M. Yusuf
- Produced by: F. M. Sardar; S.M. Yousuf
- Starring: Nayyar Sultana; Habib; Waheed Murad; Rehana; Rukhsana; Agha Talish
- Music by: A. Hameed
- Production companies: S&Y Films
- Release date: 3 August 1962
- Running time: 180 minutes
- Country: Pakistan
- Language: Urdu

Aulaad (transl. Progeny) is a 1962 Pakistani Urdu-language black and white film.

The film was released on 3 August 1962, and was directed by S. M. Yusuf who also co-produced it with F. M. Sardar under the banner F&Y Movies.

The story, dialogues and lyrics were written by Fayyaz Hashmi. The cast included Nayyar Sultana, Habib, Waheed Murad, Talish and Rehana. The music composition was done by A. Hameed. The film revolves around the struggles and greatness of a woman as a mother and wife. It marked the debut of Murad as an actor who later went on to become a superstar of Pakistani cinema.

Aulad was a super-hit musical film of 1962, and won two awards at the 1962 Nigar Awards ceremony including Best director and Best Actress for Sultana.

== Cast ==
- Nayyar Sultana
- Habib
- Waheed Murad
- Rehana
- Talish
- Sultan Rahi (as a guest appearance)

== Music ==
The music of the film was composed by music director A. Hameed. The songs were written by Fayyaz Hashmi.

| Song | Singers | Notes |
|---|---|---|
| "Haq La Illaha Illallah Farma Diya Kamli Waley Ne" | Saleem Raza, Munir Hussain and others | A Na`at Qawwali song |
| "Tum Qoum Ki Maan Ho Socho Zara, Aurat Sey Hamein Yeh Kehna Hai" | Naseem Begum | |
| "Naam Lay Lay Ke Tera Hum Tau Jiyey Jaaein Gey" | Naseem Begum | |
| "Tum Milay Pyaar Mila, Abb Koi Armaan Nahin" | Naseem Begum and Saleem Raza | |

== Box office ==
Aulaad was a golden jubilee hit film at the box office.

== Awards ==
Aulaad received 2 awards at 6th Nigar Awards in the following categories at :

- Best director - S. M. Yusuf
- Best actress - Nayyar Sultana
