= S. Suleman =

Pakistani film director (1938–2021)

- Born: Syed Suleman; 29 December 1938; Hyderabad State, British India
- Died: 14 April 2021 (aged 82); Lahore, Pakistan
- Other names: Sullu Bhai
- Occupations: Film director; Actor; Producer
- Years active: 1948 – 2014
- Spouse: Zareen Panna (m. 1967–2021)
- Children: 5
- Relatives: Santosh Kumar (brother); Mansoor (brother); Darpan (brother); Sabiha Khanum (sister-in-law); Nayyar Sultana (sister-in-law)
- Awards: 10 Nigar Awards; Pride of Performance Award (year?); Sitara-e-Imtiaz Award (year?)

Syed Suleman (29 December 1938 – 14 April 2021), also known as S. Suleman or Sullu Bhai, was a Pakistani film director.

He also appeared in Bollywood films with minor roles before migrating to Pakistan, where he directed at least 48 films in Pakistan film industry between 1961 and 1998, including two Punjabi films.

He made his acting debut with an Indian film Mela, playing the younger version of Dilip Kumar's role. He made his directorial debut with Gulfam (1961) while his last film as a director is Very Good Dunya Very Bad Log (1998). Zeenat (1975) is the first film of Suleman which helped him to earn his first Nigar Awards — Best Director. He also directed Urdu TV serials after discontinuing work in the Pakistan film industry.

== Early life ==
He was born as Syed Suleman in Hyderabad State, British India (in modern-day Hyderabad, India). He migrated to Pakistan in the early 1950s to join his two brothers, Santosh Kumar and Darpan, in Lahore. He married actress and dancer Zareen Panna in the 1960s, with whom he had five children, including two sons and one daughter. S. Suleman first worked as an assistant to the veteran film director Anwar Kamal Pasha. He is the recipient of ten Nigar Awards.

== Career ==
He first appeared in films in 1947, when he played Dilip Kumar's younger role in film Mela (1948). After moving to Pakistan following the partition of India, he ventured in Pakistan films in the mid-50s. He initially worked at the editing department, and later a Pakistani film director and producer Anwar Kamal Pasha made him assistant director for film Sarfarosh (1956) starring Suleman's elder brother Santosh Kumar and sister-in-law Sabiha Khanum. He later worked as an assistant director of Saat Lakh (1957) and Saathi (1959). Following the promotion of Saathi, he made his directorial debut with Gulfam. In 1963, he collaborated with Darpan for Baaji (1963) and Taangewala (1963). In 1966, he directed Tamasha that flopped at the box office. A year later, the film flopped he collaborated with a writer Agha Hasan Imtisal and a music director Nisar Bazmi for the production of Jaise Jante Nahin (1969), Bewafaa (1970), Sabaq (1972), and Shararat (1976). Bewafaa was the only film of Suleman starring Waheed Murad. Noted Pakistani film director Syed Noor first had assisted him in film direction before launching his independent career as a director.

After creating ten films in collaboration with Muhammad Ali and Zeba, he worked with new actors such as Nadeem Baig and Shabnam. He also introduced Ghulam Mohiuddin to films with Anarri, Babra Sharif with Intezar (1974), Waseem Abbas with Manzil (1981). Some singers also made their debut with Suleman's films such as Mujeeb Aalam with "Main Khushsi Se Kyun Na Gaaon" from Lori, Tahira Syed with "Yeh Mehfil Jo Aaj Saji Hai" from Muhabbat, and Zil-e-Huma with "Sulagh Raha Hai Tann Mera" from Very Good Dunya Very Bad Log.

Following the introduction of Videocassette recorder (VCR) in Pakistan, he directed action-thriller films Manzil (1981) and Tere Bina Kya Jeena (1982) starring Muhammad Ali. After making 48 films, he left the film industry and joined television where he directed serials such as Colony 52, Kiya Yehi Pyar Hai and Ana.

== Filmography ==
Year	Title	Director	Ref(s)
1961	Gulfam	Yes	
1963	Baji	Yes	
1963	Mehndi Walay Hath	Yes	
1963	Tangay Wala	Yes	
1965	Tamasha	Yes	
1966	Tasvir	Yes	
1966	Lori	Yes	
1967	Aag	Yes	
1968	Yaar Dost	Yes	
1969	Piya Millan Ki Aas	Yes	
1969	Jaisay Jantay Nahi	Yes	
1969	Baharen Phir Bhi Ayen Gi	Yes	
1970	Bewafa	Yes	
1970	Mohabbat Rang Laye Gi	Yes	
1970	Ek Phool Ek Pathar	Yes	
1971	Teri Soorat Meri Ankhen	Yes	
1972	Ilzam	Yes	
1972	Mohabbat	Yes	
1972	Sabaq	Yes	
1973	Society	Yes	
1973	Tera Gham Rahay Salamat	Yes	
1973	Baharon Ki Manzil	Yes	
1974	Intezar	Yes	
1974	Miss Hippy	Yes	
1974	Bhool	Yes	
1975	Zeenat	Yes	
1975	Gumrah	Yes	
1975	Anari	Yes	
1975	Sharat	Yes	
1975	Zanjeer	Yes	
1976	Mom Ki Guriya	Yes	
1976	Aaj Aur Kal	Yes	
1976	Tallaq	Yes	
1976	Insaniyat	Yes	
1977	Uff Yeh Bivian	Yes	
1977	Mere Huzoor	Yes	
1977	Pyar Ka Waada	Yes	
1978	Aag Aur Zindagi	Yes	
1978	Abhi To Main Jawan Hun	Yes	
1978	Prince	Yes	
1979	Nazr-e-Karm	Yes	
1980	Haaey Yeh Shohar	Yes	
1981	Manzil	Yes	
1981	Dil Ek Khilona	Yes	
1982	Teray Bina Kya Jeena	Yes	
1987	7 Sahelian	Yes	
1987	Love in London	Yes	
1998	Very Good Dunya Very Bad Log	Yes	

== Television ==
- Colony 52 (2004)
- Kiya Yehi Pyar Hai
- Ana (2004)
- Abdullah Karwani
- Taal Wala
- Kuch Dil Ne Kaha (2006)

== Death ==
Suleman was suffering from diabetes and kidney disease for some time before his death. He was admitted to a private hospital in Lahore where he died on 14 April 2021.

== Awards ==
He was the recipient of twelve awards, including ten Nigar Awards by Nigar magazine, one Sitara-i-Imtiaz (Star of Excellence) award and the Pride of Performance award by the government of Pakistan.
