= Lehri (actor) =

Actor (1929–2012)

- لہری
- Born: Safirullah Siddiqui; 2 January 1929; Kanpur, United Provinces, British India (present-day Uttar Pradesh, India)
- Died: 13 September 2012 (aged 83); Karachi, Pakistan
- Occupations: Actor; Comedian
- Years active: 1956 – 1986
- Awards: 12 Nigar Awards

Safirullah Siddiqui (2 January 1929 – 13 September 2012), commonly known by his stage name Lehri, was a comedian and actor in the Urdu film industry of Pakistan.

He is still considered as one of the most acclaimed comedians of South Asia, and is known as the comedy king in the Pakistan film industry.

In a film career spanning 38 years, he acted in 225 movies.

He won 12 Nigar Awards for "Best Comedian" from 1963 to 1982.

== Early life ==
Lehri was born on 2 January 1929 in Kanpur, British India. After independence, he along with his family, migrated to Pakistan and settled in Karachi. As a teenager he worked as a stenotypist and hosiery salesman. He performed on radio and stage before entering the film industry.

== Career ==
Lehri acted from the late 1950s until the 1980s. He won the Nigar Award 12 times for various films between 1963 and 1986; his first film, Anokhi, was released in 1956, and his last production was Dhanak in 1986. The vast majority of his films have been in Urdu, though he did perform in a few Punjabi productions.

Lehri's forte was the quip and in his monotone, his audience became used to finding a brand of quiet, almost surreptitious humour. To critics and to his fans, his restrained style came to personify the 'decency' of times gone by. After the mid-1980s, Lehri was reduced to occasional appearances on television and newspaper columns. By the time private-sector television arrived, though, the film industry was struggling and all that it had once encompassed was looked upon both with a sense of loss and with fondness.

== Death ==
Lehri retired in late 1986 after suffering a stroke; after his retirement, his health started deteriorating, then Prime Minister Benazir Bhutto set up a monthly stipend for him of Rs. 2,500, which he continued to receive until his last days; however there was no increase in the amount until his death. He died on 13 September 2012 in Karachi, aged 83, from lung, kidney disease, diabetes, high blood pressure and heart issues. He had been under treatment and was on a ventilator due to prolonged illness in a private hospital at the time of his death. Lehri’s funeral prayers took place on the same evening at Masjid-e-Baitul-Mukkaram in Gulshan-e-Iqbal, and he was buried at the Yasinabad Graveyard, Karachi.

== Filmography ==
- 1956: Anokhi (Urdu)
- 1957: Bedari (Urdu)
- 1960: Insaf (Urdu)
- 1960: Noukari (Urdu)
- 1960: 2 Ustad (Urdu)
- 1960: Aladin Ka Beta (Urdu)
- 1960: Raat Kay Rahi (Urdu)
- 1960: Neelofar (Urdu)
- 1960: Saheli (Urdu)
- 1961: Insan Badalta Hay (Urdu)
- 1961: Zamana Kya Kahega (Urdu)
- 1961: Ham Ek Hayn (Urdu)
- 1962: Qaidi (Urdu)
- 1962: Aulad (Urdu)
- 1962: Dosheeza (Urdu)
- 1962: Susral (Urdu)
- 1962: Mehboob (Urdu)
- 1962: Anchal (Urdu)
- 1963: Ishq Par Zor Nahin (Urdu)
- 1963: Jab Say Dekha Hay Tumhen (Urdu)
- 1963: Baaji (Urdu)
- 1963: Daaman (Urdu)
- 1963: Dulhan (Urdu)
- 1963: Qatal Kay Baad (Urdu)
- 1964: Chhoti Ammi (Urdu)
- 1964: Touba (Urdu)
- 1964: Paigham (Urdu)
- 1964: Ashiana (Urdu)
- 1964: Baghi Sipahi (Urdu)
- 1964: Chhoti Behan (Urdu)
- 1965: Aisa Bhi Hota Hay (Urdu)
- 1965: Shabnam (Urdu)
- 1965: Teray Shehar Mein (Urdu)
- 1965: Kaneez (Urdu) (Lehri won the Nigar Award for this film)
- 1966: Aag Ka Darya (Urdu)
- 1967: Devar Bhabi (Urdu)
- 1967: Hamraz (Urdu)
- 1967: Aag (Urdu)
- 1968: Doosri Maa (Urdu)
- 1968: Jan-e-Arzoo (Urdu)
- 1968: Mahal (Urdu)
- 1968: Dil Mera Dharkan Teri (Urdu)
- 1968: Ek Hi Rasta (Urdu)
- 1968: Ek Musafir Ek Haseena (Urdu)
- 1968: Sharik-e-Hayyat (Urdu)
- 1968: Pakeeza (Urdu)
- 1968: Shehnai (Urdu)
- 1968: Saiqa (Urdu)
- 1968: Mera Ghar Meri Jannat (Urdu)
- 1968: Aawara (Urdu)
- 1969: Ishara (Urdu)
- 1969: Nai Laila Naya Majnu (Urdu)
- 1969: Piya Millan Ki Aas (Urdu)
- 1969: Jaisay Jantay Nahin (Urdu)
- 1969: Ladla (Urdu)
- 1969: Bahu Rani (Urdu)
- 1969: Andaleeb (Urdu)
- 1969: Ik Nageena (Urdu)
- 1969: Pak Daaman (Urdu)
- 1969: Dil day Kay Dekho (Urdu)
- 1969: Baharen Phir Bhi Ayen Gi (Urdu)
- 1970: Shama Aur Parwana (Urdu)
- 1970: Anjan (Urdu)
- 1970: Noreen (Urdu)
- 1970: Jalay Na Kyun Parwana (Urdu)
- 1970: Mohabbat Rang Laye Gi (Urdu)
- 1970: Anjuman (Urdu)
- 1970: Road To Swat (Urdu)
- 1971: Dunya Na Manay (Urdu)
- 1971: Afshan (Urdu)
- 1971: Insaf Aur Qanoon (Urdu)
- 1971: Rootha Na Karo (Urdu)
- 1971: Roop Behroop (Urdu)
- 1971: Salam-e-Mohabbat (Urdu)
- 1971: Jaltay Suraj Kay Neechay (Urdu)
- 1971: Charagh Kahan Roshni Kahan (Urdu)
- 1971: Tehzeeb (Urdu)
- 1972: Meray Hamsafar (Urdu)
- 1972: Main Bhi To Insan Hun (Urdu)
- 1972: Ehsaas (Urdu)
- 1973: Nadan (Urdu)
- 1973: Sehray Kay Phool (Urdu)
- 1973: Mulaqat (Urdu)
- 1973: Dil Ka Shehar (Urdu)
- 1973: Khawab Aur Zindagi (Urdu)
- 1973: Society (Urdu)
- 1973: Anhoni (Urdu)
- 1973: Nadiya Kay Paar (Urdu)
- 1974: Bano Rani (Urdu)
- 1974: Dillagi (Urdu)
- 1974: Aabroo (Urdu)
- 1974: Tum Salamat Raho (Urdu)
- 1974: Subah Ka Tara (Urdu)
- 1974: Chahat (Urdu)
- 1974: Babul Mor Muharan (Punjabi)
- 1974: Phool Meray Gulshan Ka (Urdu)
- 1974: Sawan Aya Tum Nahin Aye (Urdu)
- 1974: Sharafat (Urdu)
- 1974: Usay Dekha Usay Chaha (Urdu)
- 1974: Miss Hippy (Urdu)
- 1974: Bahisht (Urdu)
- 1975: Izzat (Urdu)
- 1975: Bin Badal Barsaat (Urdu)
- 1975: Pyar Ka Mousam (Urdu)
- 1975: Aarzoo (Urdu)
- 1975: Zeenat (Urdu)
- 1975: Mohabbat Zindagi Hai (Urdu)
- 1975: 2 Sathi (Urdu)
- 1975: Gumrah (Urdu)
- 1975: Eisar (Urdu)
- 1975: Dil Nasheen (Urdu)
- 1975: Anari (Urdu)
- 1975: Palki (Urdu)
- 1975: Bikhray Moti (Urdu)
- 1975: Soorat Aur Seerat (Urdu)
- 1975: Shararat (Urdu)
- 1975: Roshni (Urdu)
- 1975: Badal Geya Insan (Urdu)
- 1975: Zanjeer (Urdu)
- 1975: Masoom (Urdu)
- 1976: Zubaida (Urdu)
- 1976: Mom Ki Guriya (Urdu)
- 1976: Rastay Ka Pathar (Urdu)
- 1976: Koshish (Urdu)
- 1976: Daagh (Urdu)
- 1976: Aaj Aur Kal (Urdu)
- 1976: Tallaq (Urdu)
- 1976: Waada (Urdu)
- 1976: Dekha Jaye Ga (Urdu)
- 1976: 2 Aansoo (Urdu)
- 1976: Ann Daata (Urdu)
- 1976: Nasheman (Urdu)
- 1976: Insaniyat (Urdu)
- 1976: Geo Aur Jeenay Do (Urdu)
- 1976: Phool Aur Sholay (Urdu)
- 1977: Uff Yeh Bivian (Urdu)
- 1977: Sangam (Urdu)
- 1977: Jawani Deevani (Urdu)
- 1977: Jeenay Ki Rah (Urdu)
- 1978: Amber (Urdu)
- 1978: Dil Kay Daagh (Urdu)
- 1978: Aadmi (Urdu)
- 1978: Aabshar (Urdu)
- 1978: Aag Aur Zindagi (Urdu)
- 1978: Kabhi Kabhi (Urdu)
- 1978: Prince (Urdu)
- 1978: Khuda Aur Mohabbat (Urdu)
- 1978: Mousam Hay Ashqana (Urdu)
- 1979: Neya Andaz (Urdu)
- 1980: Zamir (Urdu)
- 1980: Bandhan (Urdu)
- 1980: Haseena Maan Jaye Gi (Urdu)
- 1980: Saima (Urdu)
- 1980: Badnam (Urdu)
- 1981: Dil Ek Khilona (Urdu)
- 1981: Kiran Aur Kali (Urdu)
- 1982: Bivi Ho To Aisi (Urdu)
- 1983: Maang Meri Bhar Do (Urdu)
- 1983: Nadani (Urdu)
- 1983: Tina (Urdu)
- 1984: Teray Ghar Kay Samnay (Urdu)
- 1985: Hero (Urdu)
- 1985: Halchal (Urdu)
- 1986: Dhanak (Urdu)
- 1991: Pyar Aur Paisa (Urdu)
- 2001: Babu (Urdu)
- Unreleased: Janay Anjanay (Urdu)

== Awards and recognition ==
Lehri won 12 Nigar awards, which is considered one of the most prestigious awards in Urdu and Lollywood film industry in Pakistan.

Year	Nominated work	Award	Category	Result
1963	Daman	Nigar Awards	Best Comedian	Won
1964	Paigham	Nigar Awards	Best Comedian	Won
1965	Kaneez	Nigar Awards	Best Comedian	Won
1967	Mein Wo Nahi	Nigar Awards	Best Comedian	Won
1968	Saiqa	Nigar Awards	Best Comedian	Won
1969	Nai Laila Naya Majnu	Nigar Awards	Best Comedian	Won
1970	Anjuman	Nigar Awards	Best Comedian	Won
1974	Dillagi	Nigar Awards	Best Comedian	Won
1976	Aaj Aur Kal	Nigar Awards	Best Comedian	Won
1979	Naya Andaaz	Nigar Awards	Best Comedian	Won
1980	Saima	Nigar Awards	Best Comedian	Won
1982	Beewe Ho To Aisee	Nigar Awards	Best Comedian	Won
1996	Acting	Pride of Performance Award	Arts	Won
