= Habib (actor) =

Pakistani actor, director and producer (1940 - 2016)

- حبیب
- Born: Habib-ur-Rehman; 26 November 1940; Patiala State, Punjab, British India
- Died: 25 February 2016 (aged 75); Lahore, Punjab, Pakistan
- Education: Govt. M.A.O College Lahore
- Occupations: Film actor; Film Producer; Director
- Years active: 1958 – 2016
- Spouse: Naghma (m. 1972; div. 1988)
- Children: 7
- Awards: Pride of Performance Award by the President of Pakistan in 2011; Won 3 Nigar Awards during his career

Habib-ur-Rehman (Urdu: حبیب الرحمان; 26 November 1940 – 25 February 2016), better known by his screen name Habib, was a Pakistani film actor, director, producer and television actor.

He was one of the busiest heroes of the Pakistani film industry and established himself as one of the most successful actors of Pakistani cinema, acting in almost 600 movies in a career spanning 60 years. He appeared in both Punjabi and Urdu language movies.

== Early and personal life ==
Habib-ur-Rehman was born into a Punjabi family of the Arain community, in Basi village not far from Sirhind-Fategarh in the Patiala State, Punjab, British India. His father worked in the railways, and the family moved to Gujranwala after the independence of Pakistan in 1947, where he was educated, earning three master's degrees in English literature, Urdu and Persian from the Govt. M.A.O College Lahore.

He married fellow film actress Naghma in 1972, but later separated and got divorced from her in 1988. Habib was the father of two sons and four daughters from his first wife who had died some years ago, and another daughter later from his second wife, actress Naghma. He then married Shaheen Habib and they lived together for 36 years until his death in 2016.

Khalid Tabassum, journalist and writer, wrote his film memories which were published in Daily Nawa-i-Waqt in 1986.

== Career ==
=== Actor ===
==== Urdu films ====
Having come across the Pancholi Studios by chance, he made his debut in film Lakhat-e-Jigar (1958), then some of his films flopped till Aadmi (1958). He received an important role in the film Aadmi (1958), breaking through obscurity and first became well-known as a film actor, and soon took other roles in Urdu hit films such as Ayyaz (1960), Zehr-e-Ishq (1958), Surayya (1961), Saperan (1961), Aulad (1962), Mehtab, Maa Ke Aansoo, Khandan, Aashiyana (1964), Fashion, Dil Ke Tukrey, Basheera (1972), Eid Mubarak (1965), Dil Aur Duniya, Haar Geya Insaan and Waqt.

==== Punjabi films ====
Among his Punjabi films, Mouj Mela (1963) was a super-hit musical Golden Jubilee film. He took the role of a side-hero in Platinum Jubilee film, Jeedar (1965), but he could not repeat this success until 1967. Dil Da Jani (1967), Yaar Maar, Babul Da Wehra (1968), Chann Makhna (1968), Do Mutiyaran (1968), Chann Veer (1969), Mukhra Chann Warga, Genterman (1969), Waryam, Att Khuda Da Vair (1970), Chann Puttar (1970), Taxi Driver (1970), Rangu Jatt (1970), Duniya Paise Di (1971), Sajjan Be-Parwah, Ik Doli Do Kahar, Basheera (1972), Do Pattar Annaran Dey (1972), Zaildar (1972), Khushiya and "Malanga (1986)" are his Punjabi films.

==== Television ====
In television, his most famous role was in the PTV drama Rahain (1998), in the late 1990s. Later he worked in drama Tawan (1996) and Pooray Chaand Ki Raat (2004) then he worked in drama Vanee which aired on Geo Entertainment.

=== Director and producer ===
He directed and produced two Sindhi films, Baaghi and Allah Bachayo, but without much success.

He was not successful as a film producer. Pardes and Haar Gaya Insaan were average box office films. Some other films he had produced had also flopped at the box office.

== Death ==
Habib-ur-Rehman suffered a brain haemorrhage a week before his death. At that time, he was admitted to Ittefaq Hospital, Lahore for treatment where he died on 25 February 2016 and was laid to rest at Airline Society. He was survived by seven children, five daughters and two sons.

== Selected filmography ==
=== Television series ===
Year	Title	Role	Notes
1996	Tawan	Raheem-ud-din	PTV
1998	Rahain	Wakeel Sahib	PTV
2004	Pooray Chaand Ki Raat	Chaudhary Kamal	PTV
2012	Vanee	Baba	Geo Entertainment
2013	Ullu Baraye Farokht Nahi	Yaqoob Malkana	Hum TV

=== Film ===
==== Urdu ====
- Lakht-e-Jigar (1956)
- Aadmi (1958)
- Zehr-e-Ishq (1958)
- Izzat (1960)
- Ayyaz (1960)
- Saperan (1961)
- Aulad (1962)
- Dulhan (1963)
- Ashiana (1964)
- Devdas (1965)
- Dil Ke Tukre (1965)
- Eid Mubarak (1965)
- Taj Mahal (1968)

==== Punjabi ====
- Mouj Mela (1963)
- Jeedar (1965)
- Dil Da Jani (1967)
- Chan Makhana (1968)
- Mukhra Chann Warga (1969)
- Att Khuda Da Vair (1970)
- Basheera (1972)
- Khushia (1973)
- Ik Madari (1973)
- Naukar Wohti Da (1974)
- Dara Baloch (1983)
- Rustam Te Khan (1983)
- Gernail Singh (1987)

== Awards ==
- 1958 – Nigar Award for Best Actor - film Aadmi
- 1961 – Nigar Award for Best Actor - film Surayya
- 2002 – Nigar Award Lifetime Achievement Award
- 2009 - Lux Style Awards - Best TV Actor (Satellite) - Nautankee
- 2011 – Pride of Performance Award by the President of Pakistan
