= Hassan Tariq =

Pakistani film director, film producer and screenwriter

- Born: 22 October 1934; Amritsar, Punjab Province, British India
- Died: 24 April 1982 (aged 47); Lahore, Pakistan
- Occupations: Film director, film producer, screenwriter
- Years active: 1959 – 1982
- Spouse(s): Nighat Sultana; Amy Minwalla; Rani
- Children: Rabia Tariq (with Rani); Tahir Hassan (with Nighat); Reena (with Nighat)
- Awards: 3 Nigar Awards in 1968, 1970 and 1982

Hassan Tariq (22 October 1934 – 24 April 1982) was a Pakistani film director, film producer and screenwriter who was famous for making films like Anjuman, Kaneez, Umrao Jan Ada and Devar Bhabi. His accolades include three Nigar Awards.

== Early life and career ==
Hassan was born on 22 October 1934 in Amritsar, British India. He migrated to Pakistan after its establishment. He started his career as an assistant director. He directed his first film, Neend (Sleep), in 1959 and became a successful director. He made around 40 films in the Pakistan film industry and was the main reason behind the acting success of his third wife Rani.

Most of his films revolve around the falling women characters or a hooker with a heart of gold; he explored and exposed the masses to the nawab-tawaif culture. His three famous films, Anjuman (1970), Umrao Jaan Ada (1972) and Surraya Bhopali (1976), all tell the story of a tawaif.

== Personal life ==
Hassan married three times. He was married with actress Nighat Sultana and they had two children, a son named Tahir Hassan and a daughter actress Reena; dancer and actress Amy Minwalla was his second wife and they had a daughter; he then married actress Rani and they had a daughter named Rabia Tariq.

== Death ==
He died on 24 April 1982 at Lahore, Pakistan.

== Awards and recognition ==
- Nigar Award for Best Director in film Behan Bhai (1968).
- Nigar Award for Best Director in film Anjuman (1970 film).
- Nigar Award for Best Director in film Sangdil (1982).

== Filmography ==
- Neend (1959)
- Banjaran (1962) (a golden jubilee film)
- Phannay Khan (1964) (a Punjabi language film)
- Kaneez (1965)
- Devar Bhabi (1967)
- Behan Bhai (1968)
- Mera Ghar Meri Jannat (1968)
- Anjuman (1970)
- Tehzeeb (1971)
- Umrao Jaan Ada (1972)
- Baharo Phool Barsao (1972)
- Bahisht (1974)
- Aik Gunnah Aur Sahi (1975)
- Surraya Bhopali (1976)
- Begum Jaan (1977)
- Seeta Maryam Margaret (1978)
- Sangdil (1982)
