= S. M. Yusuf =

Pakistani film director, producer (1910-1994)

- Born: Shaikh Muhammad Yusuf; 1910; Bombay, British India
- Died: 17 August 1994 (aged 83–84); Lahore, Pakistan
- Occupations: Film director; Producer; Screenwriter
- Years active: 1936–1994
- Spouse: Nigar Sultana
- Awards: Won 3 Nigar Awards in 1960, 1962 and 1964

Shaikh Muhammad Yusuf (c. 1910 – 17 August 1994), known professionally as S. M. Yusuf, (Note: sometimes spelled as S. M. Yousuf) was a Pakistani film director and producer.

He made fourteen films in British India and later after the split of India subcontinent, he worked in Pakistani cinema and made thirteen films, including the blockbuster Saheli (1960) and Aulad (1962).

He was the recipient of 3 Nigar Awards for Best Director in Pakistan and earlier in India, he had become the recipient of an award conferred by the first prime minister of India Jawahar Lal Nehru.

== Biography ==
S. M. Yusuf was born in 1910 in Bombay (in modern-day Mumbai), and then moved to Pakistan in the 1950s. He married Indian actress Nigar Sultana while he lived in India. Their marriage lasted for over five years.

He initially began his career with Shakespeare's plays, and later played supporting actor role in the Merchant of Venice, and Romeo and Juliet. The first film he made as a director was Nek Parveen (1946). Before the partition of India in 1947, he was active in Hindi cinema. He made his professional debut in Bollywood industry around 1936 with the film Bharat Ka Lal. During the 1950s, he made six films in India. Then he directed the film Saheli in 1960 in Pakistan. The film won seven awards, including five Presidential medals and four Nigar Awards.

S. M. Yusuf also introduced two important actors, Waheed Murad and Qavi Khan, to the Pakistani film industry in his films.

== Filmography ==
Key
†	Denotes films that have not yet been released

#	Title	Year	Director	Producer	Screenwriter	Ref.
1	Sharik-e-Hayyat	1967	Yes			
2	Eid Mubarak	1965	Yes			
3	Paigham	1964		Yes		
4	Ashiana	1964	Yes			
5	Dulhan	1963	Yes			
6	Aulad	1962	Yes			
7	Saheli	1960	Yes			
8	Mehndi	1958	Yes			
9	Maalik	1958	Yes			
10	Paak Daman	1957	Yes			
11	Guru Ghantal	1956	Yes			
12	Guzara	1954	Yes	Yes		
13	Anand Bhavan	1953	Yes	Yes		
14	Hyderabad Ki Nazneen	1952	Yes			
15	Bikhare Moti	1951	Yes			
16	Gumashta	1951	Yes	Yes		
17	Bahurani	1950	Yes			
18	Grahasthi	1948	Yes			
19	Pati Seva	1947	Yes			
20	Devar	1946	Yes			
21	Durban	1946	Yes			
22	Nek Pervin	1946	Yes			
23	Piya Milan	1945	Yes			
24	Aaina	1944	Yes		Yes	
25	Rai Saheb	1942	Yes			
26	Laheri Jeewan	1941	Yes			
27	Rangeela Jawan	1940	Yes			
28	Kahan Hai Manzil Teri	1939	Yes		Yes	
29	Rangeela Mazdoor	1939	Yes		Yes	
30	Daulat	1937	Yes			
31	Bharat Ka Lal	1936	Yes			

== Awards and recognition ==
- Nigar Awards – 3 Nigar Awards for 'Best Director' in 1960, 1962 and 1964.

== Death ==
He died in Lahore, Pakistan on 17 August 1994 at age 84.
