= Fayyaz Hashmi =

Pakistani film songs writer (1920-2011)

- فیاض ہاشمی
- Born: 1920; Calcutta, British India
- Died: 29 November 2011 (aged approximately 91) at Karachi, Pakistan
- Awards: Nigar Awards in 1967 and 1988

Fayyaz Hashmi (Urdu: فیاض ہاشمی; 1920 – 2011) was a Pakistani poet and screenwriter who worked both in the Indian and Pakistani film industry.

He penned some memorable songs such as the famous nazm Aaj Jaane Ki Zid Na Karo and Tasveer teri dil mera behela na sakegi. The latter made the singer Talat Mahmood famous in India back in 1944 and was instrumental in introducing him to the Calcutta film industry.

A little known fact about Hashmi is that he wrote the famous 'Na tum mere na dil mera', that was sung by Kamla Jharia, among many others. One of the couplets from this ghazal became popular that reads:

'abas naadaniyon par apni naaz karte hain, abhi dekhi kahan hain aapne naadaniyan meri'

'Dil Ko Hai Tum Se Pyar Kyoon, Yeh Na Bata Sakoon Ga Mein' sung by Jag Mohan

and then.....

"Yeh Raatein, Yeh Mausam, Yeh Hansana Hansaana, Mujhe Bhool Jana, Inhein Na Bhulana" sung by Pankaj Mullick (a non-film song).

== Early life ==
Fayyaz Hashmi was born in Calcutta in 1920. His father, Muhammad Hussain Hashmi, was also a poet with pen name 'Dilgeer' as well as a writer of stage drama. His father also worked for Madan Theatre in Calcutta as a writer and director. The family lived next door to the veteran stage director Agha Hashar Kashmiri who regularly attended the literary gatherings at his father's home.

Fayyaz Hashmi was employed as the resident lyricist by the British-owned Gramophone Company of India from 1943 to 1948. "Fayyaz Hashmi wrote his first verse, 'Chaman mein ghuncha-o-gul ka tabassum dekhne walo - Kabhi tum ne haseen kalyon ka murjhana bhi dekha hai', when he was in 7th class." He wrote his very first full songs that Talat Mahmood sang in 1941 (Sab din ek samaan nahin tha) and the runaway hit Tasveer teri dil mera behla na sakay gi with music composed by Kamal Dasgupta.

== Career in Pakistan ==
In 1951, he was transferred by his employer, Gramophone Company of India, to Lahore to organise the music scene in Pakistan. There he promoted many talented artists including Farida Khanum, Zeenat Begum, Munawar Sultana, Saeen Marna, Saeen Akhtar and Saeen Budha.

He turned to writing of film songs in 1956. Kunwari Bewa was the first Pakistani film with his songs. He wrote more than 2,000 songs for films and the Gramophone Recording Company in his lifetime. He also wrote the stories, dialogues and scripts of many hit films, and received numerous awards during his career.

== Awards and recognition ==
- Fayyaz Hashmi was awarded the 'Graduate Award' three times (A Pakistani film industry award)
- Nigar Award for 'Best Film Song Lyricist' in 1967 for Chalo Achha Hua Tum Bhool Gaye in film Lakhon Mein Aik (1967)
- Nigar Award for 'Best Screenplay Writer' in film Gharibon Ka Badshah (1988)

== Filmography ==
Fayyaz Hashmi worked as a film song lyricist for the following movies:

- Kunwari Bewa (1956)
- Bedari (1956)
- Savera (1959)
- Saheli (1960)
- Raat Ke Rahi (1960)
- Insan Badalta Hai (1961)
- Zamana Kya Kahega (1961)
- Aulad (1962)
- Paisey (1964)
- Eid Mubarak (1964)
- Tauba (1964)
- Beti (1964)
- Dil Ke Tukre (1965)
- Sartaj (1965)
- Ashiana (1965)
- Lakhon Mein Aik (1967)
- Pardah (1966)
- Rishta Hai Pyar Ka (1967)
- Diya Aur Toofan (1969)
- Love in Jungle (1970)
- Ilzaam (1972)
- Badal Aur Bijli (1973)
- Deewane Tere Pyar Ke (1997)

He also worked as a writer and director in the following movies:

- Hum Ek Hain (1961) - Director
- Zamana Kya Kahega (1962) - Writer
- Pehchan (1975) - Screenplay Writer
- Gharibon Ka Badshah (1988) - Screenplay Writer
