= Salma Mumtaz =

Film actress (1926-2012)

- سلمیٰ ممتاز
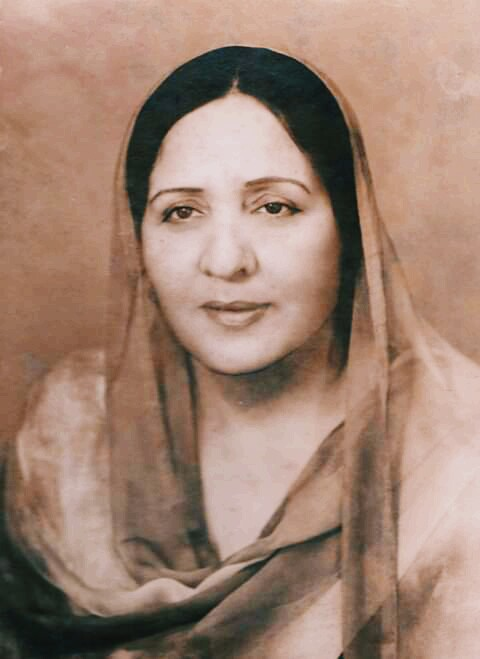
- Born: Jalandhar, Punjab, British India
- Died: 20 January 2012 (aged 85–86); Lahore, Punjab, Pakistan
- Occupations: Actress, film producer, film director
- Known for: Playing the role of 'mother' in films
- Children: Nida Mumtaz (daughter)
- Relatives: Shammi (sister); Sadaf Kanwal (granddaughter)

Salma Mumtaz (1926 – 20 January 2012) was a Pakistani film actress, director and producer.

== Early life and career ==
Salma Mumtaz was born in Jalandhar, British India in 1926. She moved to Pakistan with her family after independence of Pakistan in 1947. Salma Mumtaz made her film debut as an actress in the 1960 Urdu language film Neelofar (1960). A dancer in addition to being an actor, Mumtaz acted in more than 300, mostly Punjabi-language, films during her career.

She also became known for portraying mothers and motherly figures opposite well known Pakistani and Indian actors, including Waheed Murad, Mohammad Ali, Shahid and Punjabi language film actor, Akmal. Some of her best known films included Dil Mera Dharkan Teri (1968), Puttar Da Piyar, Heer Ranjha (1970), and Sheran Di Jori. Mumtaz also worked behind the camera as a film director and producer.

Mumtaz's brother, Pervaiz Nasir, was a film producer.

== Filmography ==
Title	Year
Salma	1960
Clerk	1960
Qaidi	1962
Mauj Mela	1963
Baji	1963
Dulhan	1963
Daachi	1964
Heer Sial	1965
Aag Ka Darya	1966
Dil Mera Dharkan Teri	1968
Diya Aur Toofan	1969
Nai Laila Naya Majnu	1969
Utt Khuda Da Vair	1970
Rangeela	1970
Maan Puttar	1970
Heer Ranjha	1970
Sher Puttar	1971
Lottery	1974
Joora	1986
Roti	1988

== Death and survivors ==
Salma Mumtaz died in Lahore on 20 January 2012, from complications of a long battle with diabetes at the age of 85. Her survivors included her daughter, television actress Nida Mumtaz. She was also the elder sister of Pakistani actress, Shammi, of the 1950s fame.

Her colleagues from the Pakistani film industry, including actress Bahar Begum and film scriptwriter Pervaiz Kaleem, were among those who paid tributes to her after her death.
