= Naseem Begum =

Pakistani singer (1936–1971)

Naseem Begum PP
- نسِیم بیگم
- Born: Naseem Begum; 24 February 1936; Amritsar, Punjab, British India
- Died: 29 September 1971 (aged 35); Lahore, Pakistan
- Other name: The Tragedy Queen
- Occupation: Playback singer
- Years active: 1956 – 1971
- Spouse: Deen Mohammad (husband)
- Children: 6
- Awards: Pride of Performance (1965)

Naseem Begum (Urdu: نسِیم بیگم), (24 February 1936 – 29 September 1971) was a famous Pakistani playback singer. She was known as The Tragedy Queen for singing sorrowful and downhearted songs in films.

She rose to prominence in the late 1950s, and by 1964, she had won the prestigious Nigar Awards on four occasions. Despite originally being billed as a Second Noor Jehan, Naseem Begum quickly carved out her own successful niche in the Pakistani film industry.

She was the original singer of the celebrated Pakistani patriotic song "Aye Rah-e-Haq Ke Shaheedo" ("O Martyrs of the Righteous Path").

== Early life ==
Naseem Begum was born in the city of Amritsar, British India, in 1936. She acquired her musical training from the classical singer Mukhtar Begum, the elder sister of the renowned ghazal vocalist Farida Khanum.

== Career ==
The first film she appeared in was Guddi Gudda, where she was a playback singer. In 1958, the music composer Mian Sheharyar was greatly impressed by her vocal range, and gave her the opportunity to sing for his film Begunah (1958).

Naseem Begum immediately achieved success with her song "Nainon mein jal bhar aayey", which became popular in Pakistan.

For her contributions towards singing industry and for army for her moral support in the Indo-Pak war, she was honored by the Government of Pakistan with the Pride of Performance in 1965.

== Personal life ==
Naseem married a book publisher named Deen Mohammad at Lahore and had six children.

== Death ==
Begum suffered a brain hemorrhage while giving birth to her sixth child and died on 29 September 1971 in Lahore, Pakistan, at the age of 35. She was laid to rest at Miani Sahib Graveyard, Lahore.

== Filmography ==
Remarkable films in which Naseem Begum sang songs are:

- Guddi Gudda (1956)
- Kartar Singh (1959)
- Salma (1960)
- Shaam Dhalay (1960)
- Saheli (1960)
- Ghunghat (1962)
- Shaheed (1962)
- Aulad (1962)
- Baaji (1963)
- Dulhan (1963)
- Ik Tera Sahara (1963)
- Haveli (1964)
- Beti (1964)
- Farangi (1964)
- Kaneez (1965)
- Aag Ka Darya (1966)
- Maader-e-Watan (1966)
- Payel Ki Jhankar (1966)
- Shahansha-e-Jahangir (1968)
- Zarqa (1969)

In addition to these films, she also sang for many Punjabi films, some of which are Tees Maar Khan (1963), Jeedar (1965), Mukhra Chann Warga and Genter Man (1969). Some big musical films on her credit are Lutera (1964), Koun Kisi Ka, Kousar, Chann Puttar (1970), Mera Veer (1967), Chann Veer (1969), Langotiya and Yeh Raste Hain Pyar Ke.

== List of her popular songs ==
- Aye Rahe Haq Ke Shaheedo
- "Veer Mera Ghori Charia"
- "Uss Bewafa ka Shehr Hai Aur Hum Hain Dosto, Ashk-e-Rawaan Ki Nehar Hai aur Hum Hain Dosto"
- "Sau Baar Chaman Mehka Sau Baar Bahar Aayi, Duniya ki Wohi Raunaq Dil ki Wohi Tanhayi"
- "Mera Bichhra Balum Ghar aa Gaya Ghar aa Gaya, Meri Payal Bajai Chhanan Chhanan Chahann"
- "Chanda Toray Chandani Main Jiya Jala Jaye Re"
- "Habibi Hayya Hayya Habibi Hayya Hayya"
- "Hum Bhool Gaye Har Baat Magar Tera Pyaar Nahin Bhoole"

== Awards and recognition ==
Year	Award	Category	Result	Title	Ref.
1960	Nigar Award	Best Female Playback Singer	Won	Shaam Dhale	
1961	Nigar Award	Best Female Playback Singer	Won	Shaheed	
1963	Nigar Award	Best Female Playback Singer	Won	Baji	
1964	Nigar Award	Best Female Playback Singer	Won	Lutera	
1965	Pride of Performance	Award by the President of Pakistan	Won	Arts	
