= List of Pakistani films of 1986 =

A list of films produced in Pakistan in 1986 (see 1986 in film) in chronological order and in the Urdu language:

== Lollywood 1986 ==
Lollywood	Director	Cast	Notes
Aawara	Inayat Ullah Khan	Musarrat Shaheen, Asif Khan, Arifa Siddiqi	
Dhanak	Mohammad Javed Fazil	Sonia, Faisal, Arifa Siddiqi, Lehri	
Zanjeer	Parvez Malik	Nazan Sanchi, Javed Sheikh, Mohammad Ali, Mumtaz	Box Office: Hit
Baat Ban Jaye	Musarrat Shaheen	Sangeeta, Mohammad Ali, Musarrat, Faisal, Firdous	Box Office: Average
Shadi Meray Shohar Ki	Masroor Anwar	Shabnam, Javed Sheikh, Shamena Pirzada, Seemab	
BeQarar	Hassan Askari	Babra Sharif, Faisal, Sherry Malik	
Jhoomar Chor	Sharif Nayyar	Shabnam, Javed Sheikh, Ejaz, Zamurrad, Abid Kashmiri	
Ruby	Nazar Shabab	Sabeeta, Izhar Qazi, Geeta Kumari, Shafi Mohammad, Rangeela	Box Office: Hit
Sheeshay Ka Dil Lohay Kay Haath	Asif Khan	Durdana Rehman, Asif Khan, Naghma, Savera	
Ham Ek Hayn	Iqbal Kashmiri	Salma Agha, Javed Sheikh	Box Office: Super Hit
Hisab	Mohammad Javed Fazil	Rozeena, Nadeem	
Bangkok Kay Chor	Jan Mohammad	Sabeeta, Izhar Qazi, Humayun Qureshi	
Dream Girl	Saeed Ali Khan	Nadia Hassan, Badar Munir, Sonia, Babar	
Qatil Ki Talash	M. A. Rasheed	Babra Sharif, Nadeem Baig, Mohammad Ali, Mumtaz	Box Office: Average
Shak	Tehsin Khan	Badar Munir, Khanum, Musarrat Shaheen, Asif Khan	Box Office: Flop
Mian Bivi Aur Woh	Farooq Khan	Sangeeta, Asif Khan, Badar Munir	Box Office: Average
Miss Bangkok	Iqbal Akhtar	Babra Sharif, Shiva, Talat Hussain	
Talash	Hassan Askari	Nazan Saatci, Nadeem	Box Office: Average
White Gold	Zafar Shabab	Vajeera, Noor Naghmi, Mohammad Ali, Nanha	Box Office: Average
Agar Tum Na Hotay	Jamshed Naqvi	Anuja, Nautan, Faisal, Zamurrad	
Ek Hi Raasta	Hasnain	Babra Sharif, Javed Sheikh, Zamurrad, Mohammad Ali	Average
Faisala		Shabnam, Nadeem, Javed Sheikh	Box Office: Hit
Nazdeekian	Ustad Nazakat Ali Khan	Samina Pirzada, Usman Pirzada, Irfan Khosat, Talish	
First Blood	Nazad Ali Fartash	Lubna Khatak, Babar, Sitara, Waseem Abbas	
Siasat	Syed Kemal	Sakina Sammu, Syed Kemal, Nisho, Munawar Saeed	
Toofan Aur Zindagi	Yousuf Bhatti	Musarrat Shaheen, Badar Munir, Asif Khan	
Baghi Qaidi	Mumtaz Ali Khan	Musarrat Shaheen, Badar Munir, Asif Khan	

== Punjabi 1986 ==
Punjabi	Director	Cast	Notes
Zulm Da Toofan	Younis Rathor	Sultan Rahi, Anjuman, Mustafa Qureshi	
Mama Saray Shehar Da	Majeed Rana	Mumtaz, Ali Ejaz, Nanha, Rangeela, Sultan Rahi	
Bad Amla	Inayat Ullah Khan	Musarrat Shaheen, Asif Khan, Babar	
Bhagi Sipahi	Fiaz Sheikh	Sultan Rahi, Mumtaz, Asiya, Mustafa Qureshi	Box Office: Semi-Hit
Kaffara	Daud Butt	Sangeeta, Shehbaz Akmal, Zamurrad, Firdous	
Griftari	Imtiaz Quresh	Mumtaz, Sultan Rahi	
Qulli	Rangeela	Rani, Ali Ejaz, Nanha, Nazli	
Chann Tay Soorma	Masood Butt	Sultan Rahi, Anjuman, Mustafa Qureshi, Mumtaz	
2 Qaidi	Amin Riaz	Sultan Rahi, Anjuman, Chakori, Rangeela, Mustafa Qureshi, Adeeb, Bahar	
Pagal Puttar	Mohammad Fyaz	Nazli, Iqbal Hassan, Musarrat Shaheen, Ali Ejaz	
Qaidi	Masood Butt	Sultan Rahi, Anjuman	Box Office: Super Hit
Riksha Driver	Shuja Aqeel	Shahid, Neelam, Kashif Raja, Durdana Rehman	
Joora	Haidar Chodhary	Anjuman, Yousuf Khan, Ali Ejaz, Sangeeta, Bindia, Iqbal Hassan	Box Office: Hit
Yeh Adam	Irshad Sajid	Asiya, Sultan Rahi, Afzaal Ahmad, Aliya, Masood Akhtar, Nimmi	
Shak	Tehsin Khan	Badar Munir, Khanum, Musarrat Shaheen, Asif Khan	
Chann Bahadur	Altaf Khan	Sultan Rahi, Anjuman, Mustafa Qureshi, Yousuf Khan	
Shah Zaman	Aslam Dar	Durdana Rehman, Zahoor Ali, Afzaal Ahmad, Arifa Siddiqi	
Insaf	Raoof Abbasi	Sultan Rahi, Anjuman, Mustafa Qureshi, Rangeela, Nazli	
Jitt Qanoon Di	Iqbal Bhatti	Mumtaz, Sultan Rahi, Iqbal Hassan, Nazli, Shujaat Hashmi, Sawan, Bahar	
Akbar Khan	Hassan Askari	Sultan Rahi, Anjuman, Gori, Mustafa Qureshi	
Chall So Chall	Younis Malik	Rani, Sultan Rahi, Mustafa Qureshi, Ilyas Kashmiri, Bahar	
Charhda Toofan	Masood Bhatt	Mumtaz, Sultan Rahi, Mustafa Qureshi	
Hitler	Idrees Khas	Sultan Rahi, Anjuman, Mustafa Qureshi, Shahida Mini	
Andha Qanoon	Altaf Hussain	Gori, Ghulam Mohiuddin, Shehbaz Akmal	
Dushami Jatt Di	Rasheed Akhtar	Kaifee, Chakori, Iqbal Hassan, Nazli, Sawan	
Nishan	Altaf Hussain	Sangeeta, Shehbaz Akmal, Nadira, Babar	
Qarz	Masood Butt	Sultan Rahi, Anjuman, Mohammad Ali, Mustafa Qureshi	
Puttar Shahiye Da	Daud Butt	Anjuman, Yousuf Khan, Sultan Rahi, Mustafa Qureshi, Iqbal Hassan, Afzaal Ahmad	
Agg Day Darya	Jahangir Qaisar	Mumtaz, Sultan Rahi, Mustafa Qureshi, Iqbal Hassan	
Aakhri Jang	Younis Malik	Sultan Rahi, Neeli, Ghulam Mohiuddin, Nadira, Bahar	Box Office: Super Hit
Bhabhi Dian Choorian	Iqbal Kashmiri	Salma Agha, Javed Sheikh, Faisal Iqbal	Box Office: Average
Kali Basti	Akram Khan	Sultan Rahi, Anjuman, Bazgha, Mustafa Qureshi	
Qasai Puttar	Tamancha Jan	Chakori, Kaifee, Musarrat Shaheen, Humayun Qureshi	
Suhagan	Hasnain	Sultan Rahi, Mumtaz, Ali Ejaz, Nanha, Javed Hassan	
Sanjhi Hathkari	M. Akram	Sultan Rahi, Anjuman, Mustafa Qureshi, Bahar	
Dara Gujjar	Imtiaz Quresh	Sultan Rahi, Anjuman	
Haq Sach	Kaifee	Sultan Rahi, Anjuman, Mustafa Qureshi, Kaifee, Chakori, Nanha	
Neya Toofan	Iqbal Ali	Sangeeta, Ghulam Mohiuddin, Sitara, Adeeb	
Babul Dian Galian	Zafar Haydar	Durdana Rehman, Shujaat Hashmi, Aslam	
Puttar Sheran Day	Daud Butt	Anjuman, Yousuf Khan, Sultan Rahi, Iqbal Hassan	
Qeemat	Haidar Chodhary	Anjuman, Yousuf Khan, Sultan Rahi, Khanum, Bahar, Adeeb, Sawan	Box Office: Super Hit
Shehnai	Qadeer Malik	Rani, Ghulam Mohiuddin, Shujaat Hashmi, Sonia	
Malanga	Rasheed Dogar	Sultan Rahi, Anjuman, Mustafa Qureshi, Afzaal Ahmad, Ilyas Kashmiri, Bahar	Box Office: Super Hit
Lali Badshah	Raja Imtiaz Ali	Sangeeta, Shehbaz Akmal, Habib, Naghma	
Mela	Hassan Askari	Sultan Rahi, Anjuman, Gori, Zamurrad, Mustafa Qureshi, Ilyas Kashmiri, Sawan, Bahar	
Balocha Tay Daku	Asif Khan	Mumtaz, Sultan Rahi, Mustafa Qureshi	
Sher Bahadur	M. Aslam	Sultan Rahi, Anjuman, Afzaal Ahmad, Zamurrad, Naghma, Habib	
Kon Zabardast	Idrees Khan	Sultan Rahi, Chakori, Musarrat Shaheen, Bahar	

== Pashto 1986 ==
Pashto	Director	Cast	Notes
Khuwaga Zaher	Ghulam Haydar	Shehnaz, Badar Munir, Haidar, Liaqat Major	
Da Veenay Karkha	Saeed Ali Khan	Nimmi, Badar Munir, Asif Khan	
Zangle	Saeed Ali Khan	Nadia, Badar Munir, Asif Khan, Sanita	Box Office: Unknown
Qaul	Qaisar Sanober	Yasmin Khan, Badar Munir, Bedar Bakht, Shehnaz, Tariq Shah	Box Office: Unknown
Zama Qasam	Mumtaz Ali Khan	Musarrat Shaheen, Badar Munir, Asif Khan, Nimmi	
Jaidad	Darwesh	Yasmin Khan, Badar Munir, Asif Khan, Khanum	
Da Wakht Badshah	Ansakh Saeedi	Yasmin Khan, Badar Munir, Nimmi	
Levaney Khan	Saeed Ali Khan	Nadia, Badar Munir, Asif Khan, Bedar Bakht	
Poti Ain Pag	H. E. Bukhari	Ishrat Chaudhary, Mehboob Alam	Box Office: Unknown
Yasmeen	Sabir Waseem	Yasmin Khan, Badar Munir, Zamurrad, Bedar Bakht	Box Office: Unknown
Da Mor Inteqam	Iqbal Kashmiri	Salma Agha, Javed Sheikh, Talish, Noutan	
Guzar	Nasir Raza Khan	Shehnaz Khan, Badar Munir, Asif Khan, Tariq Shah	
Laram	Darwesh	Nimmi, Badar Munir, Humayun Qureshi, Firdous	Box Office: Hit
Paidagir	Syed Amir Sarhadi	Yasmin Khan, Badar Munir, Nemat Sarhadi	
Da Lastonri Mar	Darwesh	Yasmin Khan, Badar Munir, Asif Khan, Bedar Bakht	
Haqdar	Darwesh	Khanum, Badar Munir, Asif Khan, Darwesh, Ismael Shah	
Jirga	Qaisar Sanober	Yasmin Khan, Badar Munir, Asif Khan, Amrozia, Nageena, Parveen Bobby, Nemat Sarhadi	
Sarkash	Nasir Raza Khan	Khanum, Badar Munir, Asif Khan, Nimmi, Tariq Shah	
Yawa Veena	Saleem Chhotoo	Yasmin Khan, Badar Munir, Asif Khan, Surayya Khan	
Kha Khawar Bad Nishta	Aziz Tabussum	Musarrat Shaheen, Badar Munir, Bedar Bakht, Shehnaz	
Da Sheshay Zra	Asif Khan	Savera, Asif Khan, Durdana Rehman, Naghma	
Dushman Kaka	Tehsin Khan	Badar Munir, Asif Khan, Mohammad Ali, Khanum	Box Office: Flop
Jawand O Toofan	Yousuf Bhatti	Musarrat Shaheen, Badar Munir, Asif Khan, Nisho, Umar Daraz, Surayya Khan, Aman, Bahar	
Khair Bashi	Yasmin Khan	Yasmin Khan, Bedar Bakht, Humayun Qureshi, Nimmi	
Qalang	Inayat Ullah Khan	Yasmin Khan, Badar Munir, Bedar Bakht, Suraiya Khan, Parveen Bobby	
Wafadar	Sabir Waseem	Yasmin Khan, Badar Munir, Aman, Zamurrad, Muslim Amaan	
Bay Wakoof	Aziz Tabassum	Musarrat Shaheen, Badar Munir, Liaqat Major, Umar Daraz Khalil, Nemat Sarhadi	

== See also ==
- 1986 in Pakistan
