= List of Pakistani films of 1988 =

A list of films produced in Pakistan in 1988 (see 1988 in film) and in the Urdu language:

== Lollywood (Jan-Dec 1988) ==
Lollywood	Director	Cast	Notes
Chakkar	Nazrul Islam	Babra Sharif, Faisal, Kaveeta, Qavi	
Qatilon Kay Qatil	M. A. Rasheed	Salma Agha, Javed Sheikh, Afzaal Ahmad, Rangeela	
Aman Ki Gaud	M. Abdullah	Sushma Shahi, Jameel Babar, Durdana Rehman	
Maa Bani Dulhan	Iqbal Kashmiri	Babra Sharif, Ismael Shah, Sushma Shahi, Jahanzeb, Tariq Aziz	
Daku Ki Larki	Mumtaz Ali Khan	Babra Sharif, Babar, Rangeela, Mustafa Qureshi	
Disco Deevaney	Jafar Bukhari	Santra, Zafar Iqbal, Aliya	
Shehanshah	Sangeeta	Sultan Rahi, Babra Sharif, Ismael Shah, Nazan Sanchi	
Aag Hi Aag	Mohammad Javed Fazil	Salma Agha, Javed Sheikh, Sabeeta, Ghulam Mohayuddin	
Choron Ki Badshah	Jan Mohammad	Kaveeta, Izhar Qazi, Salma Agha, Mustafa Qureshi	
Hangama	Aziz Tabassum	Kaveeta, Sabeeta, Sheri, Asif Khan	
Haseena 420	Masood Butt	Neeli, Sultan Rahi, Ghulam Mohayuddin, Jahanzeb	Box Office: Super Hit
Inteha	Qesar Mehmood	Sitara, Badar Munir, Urooj	
Baghi Haseena	Zafar Shabab	Babra Sharif, Izhar Qazi, Kaveeta, Ismael Shah	Box Office: Average
Meri Adalat	M. A. Rasheed	Sachurita, Nadeem, Mustafa Qureshi	Box Office: Average
Kalay Baadal	Manzoor Ahmad	Durdana Rehman, Asif Khan, Abid Ali, Adeeb, Bahar	
Bazar-e-Husn	Mohammad Javed Fazil	Salma Agha, Nadeem, Sameena Peerzada, Faisal	Box Office: Hit
Masoom Gawah	Mohammad Tariq	Neeli, Ismael Shah, Qavi, Firdous	
Gharibon Ka Badshah	Parvez Malik	Javed Sheikh, Salma Agha, Nida Mumtaz, Asif Khan, Abid Ali, Anwar Iqbal	Box Office: Hit
Qismat Wala	Agha Hussaini	Sultan Rahi, Anjuman, Mustafa Qureshi, Sitara, Bahar	
Sheesh Nagin	Sharif Ali	Shabnam, Javed Sheikh, Rangeela	
Sherni	Daud Butt	Salma Agha, Javed Sheikh, Humayun Qureshi, Rashid Mehmood, Firdous, Babar	
Lady Boss	Baqar Rizvi	Musarrat Shaheen, Badar Munir, Naghma	
Pyasi	Aziz Meeruti	Aneeta Raj, Babar, Aliya, Humayun Qureshi	

== Punjabi (Jan-Dec 1988) ==
Punjabi	Director	Cast	Notes
Khan Daku	Unknown	Unknown	
Commando Action	A. Riaz	Nadira, Ghulam Mohayuddin, Mustafa Quresh, Shahid	
Sakhi Daata	Zahoor Hussain Gilani	Nautan, Yousuf Khan, Neeli, Deeba, Babar, Humayun Qureshi	
Maula Bakhsh	Younis Malik	Sultan Rahi, Neeli, Nadira, Ghulam Mohayuddin, Bahar	Box Office: Super Hit
Garm Lahoo	M. Sharif	Neelo, Sultan Rahi, Shujaat Hashmi, Chakori	
Dilawar Khan	Abid Shujaa	Neeli, Sultan Rahi, Ghulam Mohayuddin, Shahid	Box Office: Flop
Elaan-e-Jung	Mohammad Sarwar	Sushma Shahi, Sultan Rahi, Jahanzeb	
Allah Ditta	Iqbal Kashmiri	Sultan Rahi, Gori, Sushma Shahi, Mustafa Qureshi	
Jatt Majhay Da	Masood Butt	Yousuf Khan, Sangeeta, Rani, Sultan Rahi	
Pyar Tera Mera	Nazeer Hussain	Mumtaz, Ghulam Mohayuddin, Sonia, Rangeela, Bahar	
Shehanshah	Sangeeta	Sultan Rahi, Babra Sharif, Ismael Shah	
Mafroor	Hassan Askari	Nadira, Sultan Rahi, Ghulam Mohayuddin, Mumtaz	Box Office: Super Hit
Daagh	Aslam Dar	Salma Agha, Javed Sheikh, Durdana Rehman	
Ik Shehanshah	Sangeeta	Babra Sharif, Sultan Rahi, Nazan, Ismael Shah	
Hukumut	Haidar Chodhary	Nadira, Sultan Rahi, Gori, Izhar Qazi	
Basheera in Trouble	Javed Hassan	Sultan Rahi, Khanum, Javed Hassan, Rangeela, Sonia	
Tohfa	Daud Butt	Nadira, Sultan Rahi, Ismael Shah, Neeli	
Allah Dad	Masood Butt	Neeli, Sultan Rahi, Izhar Qazi, Sitara	
Bardasht	Haidar Chodhary	Anjuman, Izhar Qazi, Ghulam Mohayuddin	
Mukhra	Iqbal Kashmiri	Babra Sharif, Nadeem, Samina Pirzada, Adeeb, Humayun Qureshi, Talish, Jameel Babar	Box Office: Hit
Taqatwar	Hasnain	Chakori, Sultan Rahi, Mumtaz, Aliya	
Mundri	Altaf Hussain	Mumtaz, Sultan Rahi, Ghulam Mohayuddin	
Noori	Altaf Hussain	Sultan Rahi, Anjuman, Izhar Qazi, Rangeela	
Sherbaz Khan	Hassan Askari	Kaveeta, Yousuf Khan, Sonia, Babar, Asif Khan	
Sheru Tay Sultan	Zaki Jaral	Mumtaz, Sultan Rahi, Mustafa Qureshi	
Jang	Masood Butt	Neeli, Sultan Rahi, Yousuf Khan, Samina Pirzada, Babar, Ilyas Kashmiri	
Bano	Ghulam Mohayuddin	Bahar, Aslam Parvez, Nazar, Zeenat	
Madari	Nasir Raza Khan	Musarrat Shaheen, Asif Khan, Shehnaz	
Chann Punjab Da	Mohammad Saleem	Sitara, Shehbaz Akmal, Shahid, Nazli	
Sherni	Daud Butt	Salma Agha, Javed Sheikh, Humayun Qureshi	
Hunter Wali	Iqbal Kashmiri	Sultan Rahi, Anjuman, Mustafa Qureshi, Rangeela, Humayun Qureshi	
Roti	Veena	Sultan Rahi, Anjuman, Mustafa Qureshi, Talish, Bahar	Box Office: Super Hit
Aakhri Muqadma	Iftikhar Chodhary	Anjuman, Ghulam Mohayuddin, Iqbal Hassan, Nazli, Ilyas Kashmiri, Bahar	

== Pashto (Jan-Dec 1988) ==
Pashto	Director	Cast	Notes
Naseeb	Rahat S. Khan	Durdana Rehman, Badar Munir, Rahila, Asif Khan	
Noukar	Aziz Tabassum	Musarrat Shaheen, Liaqat Major, Asif Khan, Shehnaz	
Zama Jang			
Badguman	Noor Karim Bangash	Suneeta Khan, Asif Khan, Nighat Yasmeen	
Soudagar	Saeed Ali Khan	Suneeta Khan, Badar Munir, Musarrat Shaheen	
Shaka	Basheer Rana	Anjuman, Shehbaz Akmal, Babar, Afzal, Soniya	
Yadona Dolei	Munir Ahmad	Bindia, Asif Khan, Nimi, Rangeela, Yasmeen	
Hercules	Tamacha Jan	Nadia Hafeez, Badar Munir, Umar Daraz	
Hisab Kitab	Malik M. Khan	Khanum, Badar Munir, Shenaz	
Da Plar Arman	Farooq Qaisar Khan	Musarrat Shaheen, Asif Khan, Badar Munir, Sangeeta	
Da Mar Navey	Saeed Ali Khan	Suneeta Khan, Badar Munir, Khanum	
Farz-o-Qanoon	Darwesh	Khanum, Badar Munir, Babar, Parveen Bobby	
Sharafat	Qesar Mehmood	Khanum, Badar Munir, Asif Khan, Nemat Sarhadi	
Dushman Dada	Rai Farooque	Shahida Mini, Badar Munir, Deeba, Ismael Shah, Saba Shaheen	
Asli Mujrim	Farooq Qaisar Khan	Suneeta Khan, Badar Munir, Musarrat Shaheen	
Dakah	M. Salim Chhotoo	Shehnaz Khan, Badar Munir, Durdana Rehman	
Bacha	Saeed Ali Khan	Suneeta Khan, Badar Munir, Suneeta	
Da Bhabhi Bangri	Darwesh	Neeli, Sultan Rahi, Izhar Qazi, Sitara	
Masto Sarmast	Aziz Khan	Suneeta Khan, Badar Munir, Afshan, Asif Khan	
Nangyalay	Wali Sahib	Musarrat Shaheen, Badar Munir, Naghma	
Shah Laila	Shoaib Gilani	Musarrat Shaheen, Asif Khan, Sumbal	
Da Disco Lewanai	Darwesh	Anjuman, Badar Munir, Sangeeta, Rangeela	
Damto Zor	Rai Farooque	Durdana Rehman, Badar Munir, Asif Khan	
Ghazi-o-Shaheed	Haidar	Shehnaz Khan, Badar Munir, Asif Khan	
Khan Pa Japan Kay	Aziz Tabassum	Shehnaz Khan, Badar Munir, Shehzadi	
Peerangye	Arshad Mirza	Nimmi, Badar Munir, Asif Khan, Rangeela	
Khan Badmash	Saeed Ali Khan	Musarrat, Badar Munir, Suneeta, Asif Khan, Sitara	

== See also ==
- 1988 in Pakistan
