= List of Pakistani films of 1989 =

A list films produced in Pakistan in 1989 (see 1989 in film) and in the Urdu language:

== Lollywood 1989 (Jan - Dec) ==
Lollywood	Director	Cast	Notes
Josheela Dushman	G. M. Din	Mustafa Qureshi, Sangeeta, Ismael Shah	
Jeenay Ki Aarzoo	Hassan Farooque	Mumtaz, Asif Khan, Shahid, Abid Ali, Tariq Shah	
Ik Jaan Hayn Hum	Hasnain	Mumtaz, Javed Sheikh, Izhar Qazi, Rangeela, Humayun Qureshi	
Dushmano Kay Dushman	Mohammad Javed Fazil	Babra Sharif, Javed Sheikh, Shakila Qureshi	
Sarfarosh	Iqbal Kashmiri	Sultan Rahi, Neeli, Jahanzeb, Sushma Shahi, Abid Ali, Rangeela, Asim Bukhari, Abid Butt	Urdu/Punjabi (double version)
Taqat Ka Toofan	Sangeeta	Salma Agha, Nadeem, Ghulam Mohiuddin, Jahanzeb	Box Office: Average
Kraye Kay Qatil	Faza Hussain Quresh	Babra Sharif, Ismael Shah, Mohammad Ali, Deeba	
Shani	Saeed Rizvi	Babra Sharif, Sherry Malik, Mohammad Ali, Sabiha, Nayyar Sultana, Talish, Asif Khan	Box Office: Hit
Madam Bawri	Nazar-ul-Islam	Neeli, Sultan Rahi, Javed Sheikh, Asif Khan, Munawar Saeed, Humayun Qureshi, Rangeela, Albela, Jamil Fakhri	Box Office: Hit Urdu/Punjabi (double version)
Roop Ki Rani	Jan Mohammad Jamman	Neeli, Javed Sheikh, Talish, Rangeela, Sultan Rahi, Humayun Qureshi	
Badshah	Zahoor Hussain Gilani	Kaveeta, Ismael Shah, Shahida Mini, Humayun Qureshi, Mustafa Qureshi	Punjabi/Urdu (double version)
Manila Kay Janbaz	Jan Mohammad Jamman	Kaveeta, Izhar Qazi, Ismael Shah, Mustafa Qureshi	
Rangeela Jasoos	Iqbal Kashmiri	Neeli, Sultan Rahi, Javed Sheikh, Ghulam Mohiuddin, Naghma, Rangeela	Urdu/Punjabi (double version)
Barood Ki Chhaon Mein	Nazar-ul-Islam	Kaveeta, Nadeem, Sushma Shahi, Neelo, Mustafa Qureshi, Humayun Qureshi, Qavi	Box Office: Average
Nagin Jogi	Masood Butt	Nadira, Sultan Rahi, Gori, Ghulam Mohiuddin, Munawar Saeed	Urdu/Punjabi (double version)
Mohabbat Ho To Aisi Ho	Feroze	Zeba, Mohammad Ali, Sherry Malik, Gori, Abid Kashmiri, Aslam Parvez, Sabiha Khanum, Nayyar Sultana, Majeed Zarif	
Lady Commando	Shamim Ara	Shabnam, Babra Sharif, Ghulam Mohiuddin, Shiva, Jameel Babar, Rangeela, Nasir Chann	
Ameer Khan	Younis Malik	Neeli, Sultan Rahi, Javed Sheikh, Ghulam Mohiuddin, Naghma, Tariq Shah	Urdu/Punjabi (double version)
Aag Aur Suhag	Nasir Raza Khan	Shehnaz Khan, Asif Khan, Tariq Shah, Raheela Agha, Nageena Khanum, Tariq Shah	
Toofani Bijlian	Nazar Shabab	Neeli, Javed Sheikh, Ismael Shah, Humayun Qureshi, Rangeela	Box Office: Average
Inteqam Hum Lenge	Baqar Rizvi	Karishma, Shiva, Deeba, Mustafa Qureshi, Chakram	
Zakhmi Aurat	Iqbal Rizvi	Nadira, Sultan Rahi, Javed Sheikh, Sehar, Afzaal Ahmad, Naghma, Talish, Sawan, Zahir Shah, Altaf Khan, Khalifa Nazir, Seema	Punjabi/Urdu (double version)
Qayamat Say Qayamat Tak	Mumtaz Ali Khan	Naila, Ajab Gul, Sonia, Haidar Abbas	Urdu/Punjabi (double version)
Jurm-o-Qanoon	Nasir Raza Khan	Mumtaz, Asif Khan, Shahid, Rangeela, Bahar, Shehnaz, Saba Sheikh, Tariq Shah, Bedar Bakht	

== Punjabi 1989 (Jan - Dec) ==
Punjabi	Director	Cast	Notes
Jaal	Daud Butt	Neeli, Sultan Rahi, Humayun Qureshi, Bahar, Adeeb	
Jaan Nisar	Daud Butt	Neeli, Sultan Rahi, Sushma Shahi, Ghulam Mohiuddin, Mustafa Qureshi, Firdous, Shugufta	
Sikandra	Altaf Hussain	Sultan Rahi, Anjuman, Mumtaz, Ghulam Mohiuddin, Ilyas Kashmiri, Mustafa Qureshi, Rangeela, Khalifa Nazir, Munir Zarif, Chakram, Bahar	
Super Girl	Mohammad Aslam Malik	Sultan Rahi, Anjuman, Gori, Humayun Qureshi, Rangeela, Albela, Qavi	Box Office: Super Hit
Qatil Haseena	Khalifa Saeed Ahmad	Sultan Rahi, Anjuman, Akbar, Rangeela, Humayun Qureshi	
Sarfarosh	Iqbal Kashmiri	Sultan Rahi, Neeli, Jahanzeb, Sushma Shahi, Abid Ali, Rangeela, Asim Bukhari, Abid Butt	Urdu/Punjabi (double version)
Maula Sain	Masood Butt	Sultan Rahi, Anjuman, Ghulam Mohiuddin, Rangeela, Mustafa Qureshi	
Ishq Rog	Kaifee	Babra Sharif, Nadim Abbas, Waseem Abbas, Kaifee, Chakori, Sonia, Bahar, Afzal Ahmad, Albela, Irfan Khoost, Munir Zarif, Tariq Shah	
Yarana	Younis Malik	Sultan Rahi, Neeli, Jahanzeb, Nadira, Ghulam Mohiuddin, Tariq Shah, Ladla	
Aakhri Qatal	Aslam Irani	Sultan Rahi, Anjuman, Sitara, Ghulam Mohiuddin, Mustafa Qureshi, Afzaal Ahmad, Adeeb, Ilyas Kashmiri, Zahir Shah, Seema	
Rogi	Dr. Masood Hassan	Shahida Mini, Masood Ahsan, Nida Mumtaz, Adeeb, Mazhar Shah, Afzal Khan	
Bilawal	Kaifee	Sultan Rahi, Anjuman, Talish, Afzaal Ahmad, Adeeb, Humayun Qureshi, Bahar	
Kalka	Shahid Rana	Sultan Rahi, Anjuman, Asif Khan, Afzal, Shahida Mini, Adeeb, Shafqat Cheema	Box Office: Super Hit
Madam Bawri	Nazrul Islam	Neeli, Sultan Rahi, Javed Sheikh, Asif Khan, Munawar Saeed, Humayun Qureshi, Rangeela, Albela, Jamil Fakhri	Box Office: Hit Urdu/Punjabi (double version)
Miss Allah Rakhi	Haidar Chodhary	Nadira, Ismael Shah, Deeba, Rangeela, Humayun Qureshi, Adeeb, Zahir Shah, Abid Ali	
Zabardast	Haidar Chodhary	Sultan Rahi, Anjuman, Nadira, Ghulam Mohiuddin, Talish	
Karmu Dada	Saleem Jafri	Neeli, Ismael Shah, Sultan Rahi, Sonia, Zamurrad, Talish	
Badshah	Zahoor Hussain Gilani	Kaveeta, Ismael Shah, Shahida Mini, Humayun Qureshi, Mustafa Qureshi	Punjabi/Urdu (double version)
Phoolan Devi	Masood Butt	Salma Agha, Javed Sheikh, Izhar Qazi, Humayun Qureshi, Gori	
Karma	Jahangir Qaisar	Nadira, Sultan Rahi, Ghulam Mohiuddin, Asif Khan, Zahir Shah, Adeeb, Trannum, Rashid Mehmood	
Daket	Jahangir Qaisar	Sultan Rahi, Anjuman, Kaveeta, Ghulam Mohiuddin, Mustafa Qureshi, Bahar, Sawan	
Rakhwala	Waheed Dar	Nadira, Sultan Rahi, Sushma Shahi, Izhar Qazi, Talish, Naghma, Humayun Qureshi	
Achuu 302	Altaf Hussain	Sultan Rahi, Anjuman, Talish, Humayun Qureshi, Afzaal Ahmad, Bahar, Albela, Seema	
Changeza	Daud Butt	Sultan Rahi, Anjuman, Ghulam Mohiuddin, Humayun Qureshi, Afzaal Ahmad, Abid Ali	
Mera Challenge	Azmat Nawaz	Sultan Rahi, Neeli, Nadira, Ghulam Mohiuddin, Babar, Deeba, Talish, Asim Bukhari	
Rangeela Jasoos	Iqbal Kashmiri	Neeli, Sultan Rahi, Javed Sheikh, Ghulam Mohiuddin, Naghma, Rangeela	Urdu/Punjabi (double version)
Zulm Da Suraj	Javed Iqbal	Nadira, Yousuf, Nisho, Sawan, Bahar, Mustafa Qureshi	
Khuda Bakhsh	Nasir Hussain	Kaveeta, Sultan Rahi, Jahanzeb, Sitara, Humayun Qureshi, Adeeb, Babar, Salma Mumtaz, Saiqa, Nimmo, Zahir Shah	
Nagin Jogi	Masood Butt	Nadira, Sultan Rahi, Gori, Ghulam Mohiuddin, Munawar Saeed	Urdu/Punjabi (double version)
Sheran Di Maa	Masood Butt	Neeli, Sultan Rahi, Mustafa Qureshi, Bahar, Zamurrad, Albela, Ilyas Kashmiri, Tanzeem Hassan, Saleem Hassan	
Barish	Altaf Hussain	Babra Sharif, Javed Sheikh, Izhar Qazi, Abdul Ghafoor Butt, Mustafa Qureshi, Naghma, Adeeb	
Yamla Jatt	Syed Raza Zaidi	Neeli, Sultan Rahi, Ghulam Mohiuddin, Rangeela, Bahar, Humayun Qureshi, Munir Zarif	
Ameer Khan	Younis Malik	Neeli, Sultan Rahi, Javed Sheikh, Ghulam Mohiuddin, Naghma, Tariq Shah	Urdu/Punjabi (double version)
Pani	Haidar Chodhary	Kaveeta, Javed Sheikh, Ghulam Mohiuddin, Isamel Shah, Humayun Qureshi	
Kala Heera	Tariq Hussain	Mumtaz, Ghulam Mohiuddin, Adeeb, Sangeeta, Naghma, Habib	
Jung e Jung	M. Aslam	Neeli, Sultan Rahi, Jahanzeb, Rangeela, Babar, Humayun Qureshi	
Nangi Talwar	Haidar Chodhary	Anjuman, Javed Sheikh, Ghulam Mohiuddin, Gori, Talish, Humayun Qureshi	
Mazdoor	Safdar Hussain	Sultan Rahi, Anjuman, Gori, Adeeb, Bahar, Humayun Qureshi	
30 Mar Khan	Iqbal Kashmiri	Nadira, Nadeem, Shamim Ara, Badar Munir	Box Office: Average]]
Zakhmi Aurat	Iqbal Rizvi	Nadira, Sultan Rahi, Javed Sheikh, Sehar, Afzaal Ahmad, Naghma, Talish, Sawan, Zahir Shah, Altaf Khan, Khalifa Nazir, Seema	Punjabi/Urdu (double version)
Lalu	Faisal Ejaz	Kaveeta, Sultan Rahi, Tanzeem Hassan, Chakori, Rangeela, Bahar, Saiqa	
Qayamat Say Qayamat Tak	Mumtaz Ali Khan	Naila, Ajab Gul, Sonia, Haidar Abbas	Urdu/Punjabi (double version)
Dushman Dada	Rai Farooque	Babra Sharif, Sultan Rahi, Ismael Shah, Shahida Mini	
Meri Hathjori	Masood Butt	Asiya, Sultan Rahi, Kaifee, Chakori, Mustafa Qureshi	
Mujrim	Haidar Chodhary	Sultan Rahi, Nadira, Ghulam Mohiuddin, Ismael Shah, Humayun Qureshi, Afzaal Ahmad, Kaveeta, Gori, Sushma Shahi, Albela	Box Office: Super Hit
Allah Khair	Mohammad Ashraf Butt	Neeli, Sultan Rahi, Sitara, Tanzeem Hassan, Albela, Humayun Qureshi, Zahir Shah	
Divani Disco Di	Ejaz Hussain	Munaza Sheikh, Sultan Rahi, Ismael Shah, Rangeela	

== Pashto 1989 (Jan - Dec) ==
Pashto	Director	Cast	Notes
Nang Peh Watan		Yasmin Khan, Badar Munir, Bedar Bakht, Liaqat Major	
Matlabi Dunya	Qaisar Sanober	Shehnaz Khan, Badar Munir, Asif Khan, Nemat Sarhadi	
Da Laas Pa Laas	Darwesh	Khanum, Badar Munir, Shehnaz, Tariq Shah, Suneeta, Nemat Sarhadi	
Zamka Wa Aasmaan	Majeed Khan	Shehnaz Khan, Badar Munir, Liaqat Major, Nemat Sarhadi	
Farar	Inayat Ullah Khan	Musarrat Shaheen, Badar Munir, Asif Khan, Khanum, Babar	
Da Daku Lur	Mumtaz Ali Khan	Babra Sharif, Babar, Shenaz, Musarrat Shaheen, Rangeela, Mustafa Qureshi	
Maat Keh Zanjeero Na	Musarrat Shaheen	Musarrat Shaheen, Bedar Bakht, Saba Shaheen, Liaqat Major	
Heroine	Farooq Qaiser	Musarrat Shaheen, Badar Munir, Savera, Bedar Bakht	
Sher Shah	Naseem Khan	Shehnaz Khan, Badar Munir, Durdana Rehman, Bedar Bakht, Nemat Sarhadi	
Sultan	Naseem Khan	Shehnaz Khan, Badar Munir, Musarrat Shaheen, Asif Khan	
Yo Betaj Badshah	Darwesh	Durdana Rehman, Badar Munir, Suneeta Khan, Liaqat Major	
Da Wadah Shapah	Shoaib Gilani	Musarrat Shaheen, Asif Khan, Shoaib, Liaqat Major, Khanum, Nageena	
Nar Pukhtoon	Amioah Khan	Musarrat Shaheen, Badar Munir, Rangeela, Liaqat Major	
Sher Badshah	Naseem Khan	Durdana Rehman, Badar Munir, Shenaz, Nemat Sarhadi, Liaqat Major	
Aakhri Faisala	Qaisar Sanober	Shehnaz Khan, Badar Munir, Nemat Sarhadi, Sian Nagoon, Liaqat Major	
Badmaashi Na Manam	Naseem Khan	Musurrat Shaheen, Badar Munir, Saba Shaheen, Liaqat Major	
Da Taqdeer Aik	Fakhruddi	Musarrat Shaheen, Badar Munir, Shebaz, Nemat Sarhadi	
Grengo	Saeed Ali Khan	Musarrat Shaheen, Badar Munir, Chakori, Bedar Bakht, Durdana Rehman	
Da Zulm Anjaam	Aziz Tabassum	Najma, Mustafa Qureshi, Asif Khan, Nazli, Chakori, Anita, Bahar, Humayun Qureshi	
Truck Driver	Qaisar Sanober	Farhat, Badar Munir, Nadia, Nageena, Khanum, Nemat Sarhadi	
Zarah Dushmani	Inayat Ullah Khan	Musarrat Shaheen, Asif Khan, Saba Shaheen, Ishrat Chaudhary	
Medan	Parvez Khan	Suneeta, Badar Munir, Shehnaz, Bedar Bakht, Nemat Sarhadi	
Ajal	Nasir Raza Khan	Reheela Agha, Asif Khan, Jameel Babar, Shehla, Naeem, Shehnaz, Bedar Bakht, Nida, Tariq Shah	
Da Qudrat Insaf	Rahat S. Khan	Musarrat Shaheen, Badar Munir, Firdaus Jamal, Durdana Rehman, Bedar Bakht	
Jawab	Noor Karim Bangish	Musarrat Shaheen, Badar Munir, Asif Khan, Suneeta Khan, Kaleem Shah	
Paristan	Darwesh	Musarrat Shaheen, Badar Munir, Suneeta Khan, Saba Shaheen, Tariq Shah	
Khan Dost	Munir Khan	Musarrat Shaheen, Badar Munir, Bedar Bakht, Kaveeta, Ismael Shah	
Pat Khamar	Noor Karim Bangish	Musarrat Shaheen, Badar Munir, Ghulam Mohiuddin, Beena, Imrozia, Nemat Sarhadi, Shehnaz	
Da Azadi Jung	Abdur Rasheed	Afshan, Saba Shaheen, Shazia, Ali Muslim	

== See also ==
1989 in Pakistan
