= List of Pakistani films of 1987 =

A list of films produced in Pakistan in 1987 (see 1987 in film) and in the Urdu language:

== Lollywood 1987 (Jan-Dec) ==
Lollywood	Director	Cast	Notes
Aag Aur Sholay	S. A. Hafiz	Anjana, Javed Sheikh, Mohammad Ali	
Greban	Iqbal Rizvi	Babra Sharif, Faisal, Firdous, Zamurrad	Box Office: Flop
Nazuk Rishtay	Mushtaq Babar	Sangeeta, Shahid, Ghulam Mohiuddin, Nisho, Asif Khan	
Ham Say Na Takrana	Jamshed Naqvi	Anuja, Javed Sheikh, Babar, Neelo, Nanha, Julia	
Love in Nepal	Wasir Ali	Shabnam, Izhar Qazi, Ismael Shah, Sushma Shahi	
Qasm Munnay Ki	Sangeeta	Babra Sharif	Box Office: Average
Zalzala	Iqbal Yousuf	Sudhir, Rani, Waheed Murad, Sultan Rahi	Box Office: Flop
Kundan	Mohammad Javed Fazil	Babra Sharif, Nadeem, Ghulam Mohiuddin, Mumtaz, Afzaal Ahmad	Box Office: Hit
Deewar	Amman Mirza	Babra Sharif, Javed Sheikh, Mohammad Ali, Talish, Sangeeta	Box Office: Average
Choron Ki Baraat	Iqbal Kashmiri	Nadeem, Neeli, Shiva, Sushma Shahi, Jahanzeb, Naghma, Faisal	Box Office: Hit
Manila Ki Bijlian	Mohammad Jan	Kaveeta, Sabeeta, Nazan Sanchi, Sushma Shahi	
Masti Khan	Asghar Ali Khan	Mustafa Qureshi, Shabnam, Ghulam Mohiuddin, Mohammad Ali	Box Office: Average
Saas Meri Saheli	Zafar Shabab	Shabnam, Javed Sheikh, Ayaz	
Ek Say Barh Kar Ek	Nazar Shabab	Salma Agha, Javed Sheikh, Sabeeta, Ismael Shah	Box Office: Average
Himmat Wala	Aziz Tabassum	Sabeeta, Izhar Qazi, Nautan	
Lady Smuggler	Aziz Tabassum	Shabnam, Babra Sharif	
Son of Ann Daata	Aziz Tabassum	Sudhir, Sultan Rahi, Babra Sharif, Ghulam Mohayuddin, Talish, Mohammed Ali Shehki, Zamurrad, Asif Khan	Box Office: Flop
Teri Banhon Mein	Younis Rathor	Shabnam, Mohammad Ali, Sonia, Babar	Box Office: Average
Lawa	Iqbal Kashmiri	Neeli, Shiva, Sushma Shahi	Box Office: Average
Nijat	Hassan Askari	Sabeeta, Izhar Qazi, Ghulam Mohiuddin, Sitara	
Iqrar	Inayat Ullah Khan	Ismael Shah, Durdana Rehman, Sitara, Masood Akhtar, Surayya Khan	
Rocky Dada	Arshad Qureshi	Sonia, Shahid, Habib, Bahar	Box Office: Flop
Sonay Ki Talash	Hassan Askari	Faiza Kemal, Ismael Shah	
Meri Awaaz	Iqbal Rizvi	Nadira, Ismael Shah, Sitara, Firdaus Jamal	
7 Sahelian	S. Suleman	Rozeena, Razzak, Zenat, A.T.M., Srijana Mathema, Doli Pertheba	Box Office: Flop
Badla	K. Khursheed	Nadeem, Naazan Sanchi, Shiva, Sushma Shahi	Box Office: Average
Love in London	S. Suleman	Babra Sharif, Nadeem, Nayyar Sultana, Talish, Rangeela	Box Office: Average
Mera Insaf	Zahid Shah	Babra Sharif, Izhar Qazi, Mumtaz, Shafi Mohammad, Deeba, Afzaal Ahmad, Umer Sharif, Syed Kemal, Naghma, Bindia, Saiqa, Jameel Fakhri, Malik Anokha, Mehboob Alam	

== See also ==
- 1987 in Pakistan
