= List of Pakistani films of 1981 =

1981 marked a significant period in Pakistani cinema, as it faced a rapid decline due to islamization in the country, consequently resulting in destabilization of the film industry. With growing censorship policies, Punjabi and Pashto action films dominated the field. Sultan Rahi starred in films like Maula Jutt In London and Khan e Azam, becoming an iconic figure of the time.

== Urdu ==
Title	Release	Director	Cast	Notes
Manzil	2 January	S. Suleman	Mohammad Ali, Babra Sharif, Waseem Abbas, Mumtaz, Talish, Nanha, Qavi	Box Office: Super Hit
Resham	30 January	H. M. Yousuf	Mustasfa Qureshi, Najma, Asif Khan, Yasmin Khan, Nanha, Sabiha, Adeeb	Box Office: Flop
Lajawab	13 February	Shabab Keranvi	Babra Sharif, Nadeem, Shujaat Hashmi, Roshan, Roomana, Tamanna, Jameel Fakhri	Box Office: Super Hit
Dil Ek Khilona	27 March	S. Suleman	Sangeeta, Shahid, Lehri, Roohi Bano	
Bara Aadmi	3 April	Shamas Chodhary	Babra Sharif, Mohammad Ali, Shahid, Roohi Bano	Box Office: Hit
Laggan	10 March	Rehman	Babra Sharif, Rehman, Ishrat Chaudhary, Shehla Gill	Box Office: Flop
Gunman	8 May	Iqbal Yousuf	Babra Sharif, Mohammad Ali, Waheed Murad	Box Office: Average
Meray Apnay	8 May	Shamam Ara	Shamim Ara, Shahid, Mumtaz, Waheed Murad	Box Office: Average
Dil Nay Phir Yaad Kiya	15 May	Iqbal Akhtar	Babra Sharif, Shahid, Waheed Murad, Nayyar Sultana	Box Office: Hit
Qurbani	22 May	Parvez Malik	Shabnam, Nadeem, Master Khurram, Nimmo	Box Office: Super Hit
Kala Dhanda Goray Log	29 May	Javed Sajjad	Sangeeta, Asif Khan, Waheed Murad, Samina Peerzada, Badar Munir	Box Office: Average
Aladdin	2 August	Iqbal Kashmiri	Babra Sharif, Faisal, Bindiya, Ali Ejaz	Box Office: Average
Watan	2 August	Hassan Tariq	Rani, Shahid, Mohammad Ali, Kaveeta	Box Office: Average
Kiran Aur Kali	4 September	Zahid Shah	Mohammad Ali, Shabnam, Waheed Murad, Shaista Qaiser	Box Office: Hit
Mohabbat Aur Majboori	4 September	Mansoor Sayed	Babra Sharif, Ghulam Mohiuddin, Allauddin, Nimmi, Nabeela	
Sangram	4 September	Iqbal Yousuf	Mumtaz, Mohammad Ali, Asif Khan, Adeeb	Box Office: Hit
Azeem Qaum Ki Azeem Beti	11 September	Shaad Sarhadi	Nimmi, Naeem Khan, Nasir Khan, Shammi	
Faslay	18 September	Zafar Shabab	Shabnam, Mohammad Ali, Bazgha, Nanha	
Qanoon Shikan	25 September	Quraish Chodhary	Sultan Rahi, Asiya, Afzaal Ahmad, Chakori	
Ghairao	9 October	Iqbal Yousuf	Shabnam, Mohammad Ali, Waheed Murad, Asif Khan	Box Office: Average
Yeh Zamana Aur Hay	9 October	Shabab Keranavi	Babra Sharif, Ayaz, Faisal, Andaleeb	Box Office: Hit
Tangay Wali	13 November	M. J. Rana	Shabnam, Mohammad Ali, Nisho, Bindia	Box Office: Average
Wafa	13 November	Luqman	Babra Sharif, Asif Raza Mir, Nazia Hafeez, Aslam Parvez, Faisal Luqman	Box Office: Hit
Khotay Sikkay	20 November	Aziz Tabassum	Mohammad Ali, Babra Sharif, Ghulam Mohiuddin, Badar Munir	Box Office: Average
2 Dil	27 November	Aslam Dar	Babra Sharif, Asif Raza Mir, Ghulam Mohiuddin, Talish	
100 Rifles	25 December	Sharif Ali	Musarrat Shaheen, Sultan Rahi, Badar Munir, Sweety	

== Punjabi ==
Title	Release	Director	Cast	Notes
Dushman Dar	2 January	Masood Asghar	Najma, Sultan Rahi, Mustafa Qureshi, Nazli	
Shart	23 January	Riaz Ahmad Raju	Asiya, Shahid, Sultan Rahi, Iqbal Hassan	
Kala Rupia	30 January	Akram Khan	Najma, Mustafa Qureshi, Musarrat Shaheen, Asif Khan	
Khan-e-Azam	6 February	Younis Malik	Sudhir, Asiya, Sultan Rahi, Mustafa Qureshi	Box Office: Average
Rabb Tay Maa	6 February	Akram Khan	Farah Deeba, Iqbal Hassan, Sabiha Khanum, Saiqa	
Anokha Daaj	27 February	Aslam Dar	Sultan Rahi, Asiya, Durdana Rehman, Waheed Murad	Box Office: Super Hit
Gabhroo	20 March	Jafar Malik	Asiya, Yousuf Khan, Musarrat Shaheen, Aurangzeb	
Ik Puttar Ik Veer	10 April	Waheed Dar	Najma, Yousuf Khan, Mustafa Qureshi, Sabiha	Box Office: Average
Mr Aflatoon	17 April	Naseem Haidar	Mumtaz, Ali Ejaz, Rangeela, Bindia	
Sher Medan Da	24 April	M. Akram	Asiya, Sultan Rahi, Anjuman, Mustafa Qureshi	Box Office: Super Hit
Maula Dad	8 May	Rehmat Ali	Asiya, Yousuf Khan, Mustafa Qureshi, Durdana Rehman	
Sheran Day Puttar Sher	15 May	Masood Butt	Asiya, Sultan Rahi, Mustafa Qureshi, Chakori	Box Office: Average
Toofan Tay Chattan	22 May	Arshad Mirza	Sudhir, Asiya, Mustafa Qureshi, Ilyas Kashmiri	Box Office: Average
Fatafat	29 May	Diljeet Mirza	Mumtaz, Shahid, Syed Kemal, Nanha	
Geo Shera	5 June	Masood Bin Aslam	Chakori, Kaifee, Afzaal Ahmad, Saiqa	
Athra Puttar	12 June	Altaf Hussain	Asiya, Sultan Rahi, Mustafa Qureshi, Bazgha	Box Office: Super Hit
Parwah Nein	12 June	Iftikhar Khan	Mumtaz, Yousuf Khan, Waheed Murad, Kaveeta	
Chacha Bhateeja	2 August	Haidar Chodhary	Anjuman, Ali Ejaz, Nanha, Durdana Rehman	
Chan Varyam	2 August	Jahangir Qaisar	Sultan Rahi, Anjuman, Afzaal Ahmad, Shagufta	Box Office: Super Hit
Milay Ga Zulm Da Badla	2 August	Kaifee	Sultan Rahi, Chakori, Kaifee, Anjuman	Box Office: Super Hit
Sala Sahib	2 August	Altaf Hussain	Mumtaz, Ali Ejaz, Anjuman, Nanha, Rangeela, Sultan Rahi	Box Office: Blockbuster
Sher Khan	2 August	Younis Malik	Sultan Rahi, Anjuman, Mustafa Qureshi, Iqbal Hassan	Box Office: Blockbuster
Jatt Da Vair	28 August	Younis Malik	Sultan Rahi, Najma, Mustafa Qureshi, Chakori	
Aakhri Qurbani	4 September	Syed Zahoor Hussain Gilani	Sudhir, Sultan Rahi, Musarrat Shaheen, Iqbal Hassan	
Dara Sikandar	4 September	Rehmat Ali	Mumtaz, Sultan Rahi, Mustafa Qureshi, Nanha	
Veryam	4 September	Arshad Mirza	Sultan Rahi, Anjuman, Mustafa Qureshi, Mumtaz	Box Office: Super Hit
Athra Tay Jeedar	11 September	Javed Hassan	Najma, Sultan Rahi, Kaifee, Deeba	
Chan Suraj	11 September	Rauf Abbasi	Mumtaz, Sultan Rahi, Nazli, Afzaal Ahmad	
Khar Damagh	18 September	Daud Butt	Asiya, Sultan Rahi, Iqbal Hassan, Chakori	
Basheera Tay Qanoon	9 October	Saeed Daar	Asiya, Sultan Rahi, Talish, Aliya	Box Office: Average
Jeedar	9 October	Kaifee	Sultan Rahi, Anjuman, Mustafa Qureshi, Kaifee	Box Office: Super Hit
Maula Jatt Tay Noori Natt	9 October	Amin Riaz	Mumtaz, Iqbal Hassan, Ali Ejaz, Nanha	
Muftbar	9 October	Hassan Askari	Sultan Rahi, Anjuman, Ali Ejaz, Afzaal Ahmad	Box Office: Average
Rustam	23 October	Iqbal Kashmiri	Asiya, Sultan Rahi, Mumtaz, Humayun Qureshi	Box Office: Average
Tor Deyo Zanjeeran	23 October	Mulazim Hussain Bhatti	Musarrat Shaheen, Iqbal Hassan, Nazli, Rangeela	
Zehreela Dushman	13 November	Ilyas Kashmiri	Najma, Sultan Rahi, Bahar, Aurangzeb	
Billu Sher	20 November	Parvez Kaleem	Musarrat Shaheen, Yousuf Khan, Afzaal Ahmad, Aurangzeb	
Posti	20 November	Raza Mir	Mumtaz, Yousuf Khan, Nazli, Afzaal Ahmad	
Changa Tay Manga	27 November	Haidar	Anjuman, Yousuf Khan, Sultan Rahi, Haidar, Chakori	Box Office: Average
Jatt In London	27 November	Younis Malik	Asiya, Sultan Rahi, Mustafa Qureshi, Chakori	Box Office: Super Hit
Amanat	18 December	Rangeela	Bazgha, Ghulam Mohiuddin, Rangeela, Talat Siddiqi	Box Office: Hit
Notan Da Badshah	25 December	Imtiaz Qaisar	Najma, Asif Khan, Mustafa Qureshi, Iqbal Hassan	
Sultan Tay Veryam	25 December	Waheed Dar	Mumtaz, Yousuf Khan, Mustafa Qureshi, Beena	

== Pashto ==
Title	Release	Director	Cast	Notes
Khabara Da Izzat Da	23 January	Sanobar Khan	Musarrat Shaheen, Badar Munir, Jani, Yasmin Khan	
Daagh	13 February	Iqbal Hussain	Yasmin Khan, Badar Munir, Surayya Khan, Bedar Bakht	Box Office: Hit
Aakhri Nakha	10 April	Anaskh Saeedi	Musarrat Shaheen, Badar Munir, Ishrat Chaudhary, Afzaal Ahmad	Box Office: Hit
Ghairat Zama Iman	8 May	Aziz Tabassum	Yasmin Khan, Badar Munir, Bedar Bakht, Umar Daraz	
Sogand	5 June	Inayat Ullah Khan	Yasmin Khan, Badar Munir, Bedar Bakht, Umar Daraz Khalil	Box Office: Hit
Kufr-o-Islam	24 July	Yasmin Khan	Musarrat Shaheen, Asif Khan, Mumtaz, Amrozia	
Chamnai Khan	28 August	Asghar Ali Khan	Surayya Khan, Badar Munir, Naemat Sarhadi	
Nave Ongrezey	9 October	Waheeda Khan	Musarrat Shaheen, Badar Munir, Liaqat Major	Box Office: Hit
Pakhtum Pa Wilayat Kamb	23 October	Javed Sajjad	Badar Munir, Asif Khan, Samina, Sangeeta	Box Office: Hit
Dagaz Da Maidan	20 November	Aziz Tabassum	Yasmin Khan, Badar Munir, Bedar Bakht, Shehnaz	
Dosti	11 December	Saeed Anaskh Saeedi	Musarrat Shaheen, Badar Munir, Jameel Babar, Beena	Box Office: Hit
Farz	11 December	Sabir Waseem	Yasmin Khan, Badar Munir, Liaqat Major	Box Office: Average
Aashna	18 December	Nasir Raza Khan	Musarrat Shaheen, Badar Munir, Yasmin Khan	Box Office: Average
Ghazab	18 December	Saeed Anaskh Saeedi	Khanum, Badar Munir, Jameel Babar, Ishrat Chaudhary	
Ujrati Qatil	18 December	Mushtaq Ahmad, Farooq Khan, Iftikhar	Yasmin Khan, Bedar Bakht, Nadra Momtaz	Box Office: Average
Sal Topakay	(Unknown)	Sharif Ali	Musarrat Shaheen, Badar Munir, Ghulam Mohiuddin	

== Sindhi ==
Title	Release	Director	Cast	Notes
Ghato Ghar Na Aya	9 October	Samad Sheikh	Bilqees, Babar Sultan, Farzana, Zarina Sheikh	

== See also ==
- 1981 in Pakistan
