= Sherry Malik =

Pakistani actor (born 1960)

- Born: 5 October 1960 (age 65); Karachi, Pakistan
- Education: St. Patrick's College
- Alma mater: University of Karachi
- Occupations: Actor; Director; Screenwriter
- Years active: 1983 – present
- Children: 2
- Parent: Mumtaz Ayub (mother)
- Relatives: Anita Ayoob (sister); Amber Ayub (sister)

Sherry Malik is a Pakistani actor, director and screenwriter, known for his appearances in Urdu and Punjabi films such as Tina, Beqarar, Himmat Wala, Hangama, Shani and Mohabbat Ho To Aisi Ho.

== Early life ==
Malik was born into a Punjabi Pathan family in 1960 in Karachi, Pakistan. He completed his secondary education at St. Patrick's College, and later graduated from University of Karachi. Sherry's family were close friends with Waheed Murad's family.

During an event, Malik was spotted by film director Jan Mohammad Jamman, who offered him a role in his next film, Tina, which Malik accepted.

== Career ==
=== Actor ===
In 1983, Malik made his debut in Tina; he appeared alongside Mohammad Ali, Babra Sharif, Waseem Abbas and Faisal Rehman. The film was received well at the box office and, as a platinum jubilee hit, further boosted Sherry's career.

In 1986, he featured in Beqarar, alongside Babra Sharif, Zamurrad and Faisal Rehman. It was written by Syed Noor, directed by Hassan Askari, and produced by Riaz Gul Agha. The film was a silver jubilee at the box office.

The following year in 1987 he starred in patriotic film Himat Wala along with Izhar Qazi and Rangeela. The film was a success and a silver jubilee at the box office, and his on-screen chemistry with Qazi was very well received by the critics. This led to Malik being dubbed as the "macho man", a journalistic phrase that was prevalent in the 1980s and became a metaphor for toughness, rebellion, and the anti-establishment disposition of an entire generation.

In 1988, he appeared in romantic film Hangama alongside Kaveeta, Sabeeta, Rangeela and Asif Khan, which was a silver jubilee film at the box office.

In 1989, he appeared in Shani, Pakistan's first science fiction film, directed by Saeed Rizvi and starring Babra Sharif, Asif Khan, Tamanna Begum, Sabiha Khanum, Nayyar Sultana and Mohammad Ali. The film is famous for its special effects; it was the first time such effects were seen in Pakistan.

The same year he appeared in Mohabbat Ho To Aisi Ho. The film was based upon Razia Butt's novel Shabbo. He starred alongside Mohammad Ali, Zeba, Gori and Nayyar Sultana. The film was a silver jubilee at the box office. Malik portrayed the role of Zeba's husband, who had become separated from her sober husband. Mohammad Ali and his acting were praised by the critics.

The following year in 1990, he appeared in International Goreelay along Jawed Sheikh, Ghulam Mohiuddin, Mustafa Qureshi and Neeli. The film received average reviews at the box office. In 1993, he appeared in Ottui Baruwata.

In 1994, he was offered the main role in Sarkata Insaan, a Pakistani science fiction horror action drama film directed by Saeed Rizvi, but he turned it down; in 1996 Saeed Rana offered him a role in Choron Kay Ghar Chor, which he also declined.

In 1997, he played in Anchal alongside Resham and Nadeem. The film was directed by Altaf Hussain, and despite it received average reviews it became a silver jubilee at the box office. The same year, he worked in film Karam Data, where he portrayed the role of Kashif and he starred with Deeba, Sahiba, Bahar Begum and Afzal Khan. It was a silver jubilee.

After working in films for some time, he transitioned into television, primarily working in dramas and telefilms. In 1999, he worked in drama Tum Sey Mil Kar which aired on PTV; he worked alongside Vaneeza Ahmed, Shakeel, Jia Ali, Munawar Saeed and Usman Peerzada. He portrayed the role of Dr. Roomi, a hard working and dedicated doctor who has been in love with his colleague Dr. Shameen (portrayed by Vaneeza Ahmed) for the past seven years, but is unable to admit this due to his shy and sweet nature. The drama was written by Haseena Moin and directed by Parvez Malik.

Then he appeared in the drama House of Commons which aired on TV One in 2012. He teaches film directing and writing at S3H Department Of Mass Communication, NUST an academic institute in Islamabad.

=== Director and screenwriter ===
He directed and wrote numerous telefilms for Geo TV and films including, Tere Pyar Mein, a story about a young Indian Sikh girl Preety goes to the historic city of Lahore, Pakistan for a religious pilgrimage of a Sikh holy place there with her father. He also wrote film Yeh Dil Aap Ka Huwa, a romantic story of Falak living in Switzerland and his feelings for Sitara which won eight Nigar Awards.

== Personal life ==
Malik is married and has two children; he moved to America with his family. Sherry's younger sisters Anita Ayoob and Amber Ayub were popular actresses in 1990s.

== Filmography ==
=== Television ===
Year	Title	Role	Network
1999	Tum Sey Mil Kar	Roomi	PTV
2012	House of Commons	Asad	TV One

=== Film ===
Year	Film	Language
1983	Tina	Urdu
1986	BeQarar	Urdu
1987	Himat Wala	Urdu
1988	Boloban	Bengali
1988	Hangama	Urdu
1989	Shani	Urdu
1989	Mohabbat Ho To Aisi Ho	Urdu
1990	International Goreelay	Urdu
1993	Ottui Baruwata	Sinhala
1997	Aanchal	Urdu
1997	Karam Data	Urdu

==== Screenwriter ====
Year	Film	Language
2000	Tere Pyar Mein	Urdu
2002	Yeh Dil Aap Ka Huwa	Urdu
