= List of Pakistani films of 1993 =

List of Pakistani films by year 1993

A list films produced in Pakistan in 1993 (see 1993 in film) and in the Urdu language:

== 1993 ==
Title	Director	Cast	Genre	Notes
1993
Hathi Mere Saathi		Reema Khan		
Khazana	Hassan Askari	Nadeem, Izhar Qazi, Sahiba	Drama	
Khuda Ghawah	Masud Butt	Nadeem, Neeli, Sultan Rahi, Saima	Drama	
Kotwal	Shahid Rana	Nadeem, Neeli, Sultan Rahi	Drama	
Khwahish	Nazrul Islam	Samina Peerzada, Moin Rahman, Babra Sharif	Drama	
No Baby No (film)	Sultan Rahi, Sahiba, Humayun Qureshi, Umer Sharif, Tariq Shah	Drama		
Qasam	Syed Noor	Nadeem; Saleem Sheikh	Drama	
Zabata				Also released in Punjabi language. (Double version film)
Mr. Charlie				

== See also ==
- 1993 in Pakistan
