= Mukhra (1988 film) =

1988 film

- Directed by: Iqbal Kashmiri
- Produced by: Mian Siddiq
- Starring: Nadeem Baig; Babra Sharif; Samina Peerzada; Ismail Shah; Talish; Nighat Butt
- Music by: Wajahat Attre
- Distributed by: N.I. Productions
- Release date: 25 July 1988
- Country: Pakistan
- Language: Punjabi

Mukhra (Punjabi: مکھڑا) is a 1988 Pakistani Punjabi film starring Nadeem Baig and Babra Sharif.

This film won 8 Nigar Awards in different categories in 1988.

== Plot ==
Powla (Nadeem Baig) is a village bumpkin who dreams of being brave by defeating robbers. In reality, he is a coward.

His mother (Nighat Butt) dies suddenly due to a snake bite. Powla wishes to die too so that he may reunite with his mother in death. He tries to commit suicide by laying down on a railroad track but his plan is foiled when some men find him there and take him to their boss. The men are gangsters and seeing Powla's naivety they want to take advantage of him. They plan to use his death as a way to commit insurance fraud. Soniya (Babra Sharif) is the gangsters' secretary.

Powla keeps trying to find a way to kill himself. One day, a lady is injured by a car of some gangsters. Powla sees her and takes her to a hospital. Her daughter (Sameena Peerzada) comes to the hospital and she recovers. Being grateful to Powla, she starts to consider him as her son and her daughter also thinks of him as a brother.

Meanwhile, the gangsters are still trying to kill him and commit insurance fraud. Soniya overhears their plan to kill him and decides to save him. She saves his life twice, but never reveals her true identity to him. The villagers mistakenly start to believe that it is Powla who is fending off his attackers and start considering him to be a brave man.

Powla eventually discovers Soniya's identity. His sister's marriage is due to be held, but the gangsters come again once and for all to completely destroy Powla. They wound his adoptive mother & abduct his sister. She kills herself when they attempt to rape her. Finally, Powla is no longer afraid. He teams up with Soniya and takes revenge against the villains.

== Cast ==
- Adeeb as Adeeb
- Nadeem Baig as Powla
- Babra Sharif as Soniya
- Samina Peerzada as Powla's sister
- Nighat Butt as Powla's mother
- Talish
- Ismael Shah
- Afzaal Ahmad
- Humayun Qureshi

== Soundtrack ==
The music of the movie was composed by Wajahat Attre. The songs were sung by Madam Noor Jehan, Humaira Channa, Masood Rana and Nadeem.

- Bindi Da Lashkara, Meri Bindi Da Lashkara, Sung by Noor Jehan
- Mundia, Dopatta Chhad Mera, Nahin Sharman Da Ghund Lai Da... Sung by Noor Jehan, Nadeem, lyrics by Khawaja Pervez
- Teinu Takkia Pharak Gayi Akh Ni, Tere Qadman Che Dil Ditta Rakh Ni, Dhak Dhina Dhin Dil Gaya Sung by Noor Jehan, Nadeem and Masood Rana
- Ik Mera Mukhra Pyara, Pagal Zamana Sara... Sung by Humaira Channa
- Vekh Ve Din Charya Ke Nayi... Sung by Noor Jehan
- Cheechi Wich Challa Mere Ranjhan Da Sung by Noor Jehan

== Awards ==
Nigar Awards - Mukhra (1988 film) won 8 awards in the following Punjabi language categories:

- Best Film of 1988 in the Punjabi-language category
- Best Director - Iqbal Kashmiri
- Best Script - Bashir Niaz
- Best Actor - Nadeem
- Best Actress - Babra Sharif
- Best Supporting Actress - Samina Peerzada
- Best Music - Wajahat Attre
- Best Singer - Mehnaz Begum
