= Hathyar =

Hathyar (lit. 'weapon') may refer to:

- Hathiar, a 1979 Indian Hindi-language film
- Hathyar (1989 film), a 1989 Indian Hindi-language film
- Hathyar (2002 film), an Indian Hindi-language film
- "Hathyar", a song by Gurmeet Singh and Nachhatar Gill from the 2018 Indian film Subedar Joginder Singh

== See also ==
- Hatyara (disambiguation)
