= Chief Sahib =

1996 Pakistani film

- Directed by: Javed Sheikh
- Produced by: Javed Sheikh
- Starring: Saleem Sheikh; Neeli; Javed Sheikh; Meera; Behroze Sabzwari; Zeba Bakhtiar; Ismail Tara; Mustafa Qureshi; Asif Khan; Andaleeb; Zeba Shehnaz
- Music by: Amjad Bobby
- Production company: J.S. Pictures
- Distributed by: J.S. Pictures
- Release date: 26 March 1996
- Country: Pakistan
- Language: Urdu

Chief Saab is a 1996 Pakistani musical comedy film, directed by Javed Sheikh and starring himself, Neeli, Saleem Sheikh and Meera in the lead roles. It was a super-hit musical film of 1996.

== Cast ==
- Javed Sheikh
- Neeli
- Saleem Sheikh
- Meera
- Behroze Sabzwari
- Zeba Bakhtiar
- Ismail Tara
- Zeba Shehnaz
- Mustafa Qureshi
- Asif Khan
- Andaleeb

== Music ==
The music was arranged by Amjad Bobby. The film song lyrics were penned by Saleem Ahmad Saleem and Azhar Zaman. The songs were sung by famous playback singers Shazia Manzoor, Fariha Pervez, Sajjad Ali and Waris Baig. Some of the songs became most popular among the public, especially the song " MAIN NE TUJHE KHOYA TAU AISA LAGA" written by Athar Zaman and separately sung by Waris Baig and Shazia Manzoor attracted much attention of the audience. Other significant tracks are:

- Bas Bhaii Bas Ziada Baat Nahin, Chief Sahib ... Sung by Sajjad Ali
- Sunu Sunu, Bolo Bolo Mera Tum Pe Dil Aa Gaya ... Sung by Shazia Manzoor and Waris Baig
- Raat Nasheeli, Nazrein Mila Lay ... Sung by Fariha Pervez and Waris Baig

== Awards ==
- Nigar Award for Best Comedian Ismail Tara in Chief Sahib (1996).
