= Mukhra =

Mukhra may refer to:

- Mukhra (1988 film), a Pakistani Punjabi film
- Mukhra (1958 film), a Pakistani Punjabi film
