= Loha =

Loha (lit. 'iron' in Indic languages) may refer to:

== Places ==
- Loha, Nanded, a town in Nanded district, Maharashtra state of India
- Loha (Vidhan Sabha constituency), assembly constituency in Maharashtra state of India
- Loha taluka, tehsil in Maharashtra state of India

== Films ==
- Loha (1987 film), Indian film directed by Raj N. Sippy
- Loha (1997 film), Indian film directed by Kanti Shah
- Loha (2004 film), a Pakistani film of 2004

== See also ==
- Loham, a 2015 Indian film
- Loha Singh, 1966 Indian Bhojpuri-language film
