= Watan Kay Rakhwalay =

- Directed by: Hasnain
- Written by: Mohammad Pervaiz Kaleem
- Produced by: Mohammad Younis, Dost Mohammad Dogar
- Starring: Nadeem; Sultan Rahi; Izhar Qazi; Nadira; Saima Noor; Ismail Shah; Zahir Shah; Irfan Khoosat; Abid Ali; Talish; Humayun Qureshi; Adeeb; Ilyas Kashmiri; Deeba
- Narrated by: Muhammad Riaz
- Cinematography: Babar Bilal
- Edited by: Ashiq Ali Hujra
- Music by: Nazir Ali
- Distributed by: Dost Movies
- Release date: 23 June 1991 (Pakistan)
- Running time: 155 minutes
- Country: Pakistan
- Languages: Urdu/Punjabi, Double version

Watan Kay Rakhwalay (Urdu: وطن کے رکھوالے) is a 1991 Pakistani double version action, political film directed by Hasnain and produced by Mohammad Younis. The film stars actors Nadeem, Nadira, Sultan Rahi and Humayun Qureshi. It was edited by Mohammad Ashiq Ali.

== Cast ==
- Nadeem as (Saleem Ahmed)
- Sultan Rahi as (Mehjer Sher Ali)
- Izhar Qazi as (Dsp Imran Khan)
- Nadira as (Miss Sherin)
- Saima Noor as (Mehak)
- Ismail Shah as (Munna)
- Irfan Khoosat as (Tanedar)
- Masood Akhtar as (Bara Mian)
- Ilyas Kashmiri as (Justice)
- Adeeb as (Samdbahi)
- Deeba as (Sher Ali mother)
- Humayun Qureshi as (Chandia)
- Abid Ali as (Jankia)
- Nasrrullah Butt
- Zahir Shah as (Jabla)
- Zubair as (Sabla)
- Shafqat Cheema as (Abbla)
- Talish as (Justice)
- Tariq Shah as (Panday)
- Achi Khan as (Jimmy)
- Mumtaz Malik as (Jackie)
- Mehmood Aslam as (Dannie)
- Hamid Butt
- Aasim Bhukari

== Crew ==
- Writer - Pervaiz Kaleem
- Producer - Mohammed Younis
- Production Company - Dost Movies
- Cinematographer - Babar Bilal
- Music Director - Nazir Ali
- Lyricist - Habib Jalib
- Playback Singer - Humaira Channa
