= Hatyara =

Hatyara (lit. 'Murderer') may refer to the following:

- Hatyara (1977 film), an Indian Hindi-language action crime film
- Hatyara (1998 film), an Indian Hindi-language crime film

== See also ==
- Hathyar (disambiguation)
