= Akri Shehzada =

1993 film

Akhri Shehzada
- Directed by: M. Aslam
- Written by: Saleem Murad
- Screenplay by: Saleem Murad
- Story by: Saleem Murad
- Produced by: M Jahangir; Maqsood Ahmad
- Starring: Sultan Rahi, Saima Noor, Tanzeem Hasaan, Humayun Qureshi, Adeeb
- Cinematography: Nusrullah Din
- Music by: Zulfiqar Ali
- Release date: 31 December 1993
- Running time: 137 min
- Country: Pakistan
- Language: Punjabi

Akhri Shehzada is a 1993 Punjabi action film. The film is directed by M. Aslam, who has also produced films including Khan Bahadur (1994) and Gujjar Badshah (1994).

== Cast ==
- Sultan Rahi
- Saima Noor
- Tanzeem Hasaan
- Afzal Khan
- Zahir Shah
- Humayun Qureshi
- Adeeb
- Tariq Shah
- Asam Bukhari

== Release ==
Akri Shehzada was released on 31 December 1993.

== Music ==
The music of the film was composed by Zulfiqar Ali. The film songs were written by Saleem Murad and sung by Noor Jehan.
