= Zamana (1993 film) =

- Directed by: Mohammad Javed Fazil
- Written by: Basheer Niaz
- Produced by: Humayun Butt; Haider Khalil
- Starring: Sultan Rahi; Neeli; Javed Sheikh; Izhar Qazi; Gori; Humayun Qureshi
- Cinematography: Saleem Butt
- Edited by: Rana Sikandar
- Music by: Ashfaq Ali
- Release date: 19 November 1993
- Running time: 157 mins
- Country: Pakistan
- Languages: Punjabi/Urdu; Double version

Zamana is a 1993 Pakistani film directed by Mohammad Javed Fazil, starring Sultan Rahi, Javed Sheikh and Humayun Qureshi. It premiered on 19 November 1993.

== Crew ==
- Production Company – Shahina Productions
- Music Director – Ashfaq Ali
- Lyricists – Abdullah and Yasin Hazin
- Playback Singers – Noor Jehan
