= Mera Naam Hai Mohabbat =

1975 Pakistani romantic drama film

Mera Naam Hai Mohabbat میرا نام ہے محبت
- Directed by: Shabab Kiranwi
- Screenplay by: Shabab Keranvi
- Story by: Inspired by Love Story by Arthur Hiller
- Produced by: A. Hameed
- Starring: Babra Sharif; Ghulam Mohiuddin
- Cinematography: Sadiq Moti
- Music by: M Ashraf
- Release date: 6 August 1975
- Country: Pakistan
- Language: Urdu

Mere Naam Hai Mohabaat (Urdu: میرا نام ہے محبت) is a 1975 Pakistani romantic drama film. The film's story is inspired by Love Story (1970), which in turn was based on the novel of the same name by Eric Segal. It won the Nigar Award in 1975 for Best Film of the Year, and awards in six other categories. The film was also released in China and became successful there.

Babra Sharif rose to become one of the most popular actresses of Pakistani cinema for almost two decades following the success of this film.

== Plot summary ==
This film is a story of a sad romantic girl who has cancer. She tries to hide this from her lover. Her family is unaware of this problem also. The lovers are very idealistic and truly in love with each other and this film also has a tragic end just like Love Story (1970).

== Cast ==
- Babra Sharif
- Ghulam Mohiuddin
- Zarqa
- Bahar Begum
- Tamanna
- Rehan
- Farzana
- Allauddin
- Masood Akhtar
- Inayat Anjum

== Production ==
The film's plot was reportedly inspired by a Chinese folk story.

Mera Naam Hai Mohabbat introduced two new faces to the Pakistani silver screen, actor Ghulam Mohiuddin and actress Babra Sharif, propelling them into stardom due to the box-office success of this film.

== Awards ==
Mera Naam Hai Mohabbat received 7 Nigar Awards in 1975 in the following categories.

Category	Awardee
Best Film	Mera Naam Hai Mohabbat
Best Director	Shabab Kiranvi
Best Script	Shabab Kiranvi
Best Music	M. Ashraf
Best Editor	Javed Tahir
Special Award	Babra Sharif
Special Award	Ghulam Mohiuddin

== Soundtrack ==
- Milte julte rahiye ga, Aankh mili hai Mehdi Hassan
- Aage tum peechhe ham, jao ge kahan Ahmad Rushdi
- Pyasa Kunwen kay paas aata hay Mehdi Hassan
- Yeh Duniya rahe na rahe mere hamdam Naheed Akhtar and Mehdi Hassan
- Phoolon ko dekh dekh kay sharma rahay hain aap Mehdi Hassan
- Tujhe pyar karte karte meri umar beet jaye Mehdi Hassan
- Tujhe pyar karte karte meri umar beet jaye Naheed Akhtar
- Yeh Duniya rahay na rahay mere Hamdam (sad) Mehdi Hassan

== Box office ==
Mera Naam Hai Mohabbat was a box office success in Pakistan.

Overseas in China, it released in 1981, following the success of Indian Bollywood films such as Awaara, Noorie and Caravan in the last several years. Mera Naam Hai Mohabbat became the highest-grossing foreign film of 1981, selling nearly 60 million tickets in China. At an average ticket price of CN¥0.2, the film grossed an estimated CN¥12 million, equivalent to $7.1 million (Rs. 70 million). Adjusted for inflation, this is equivalent to $25 million (Rs. 3.3 billion).
