= List of Pakistani films of 2004 =

List of Pakistani films by year 2004

This is a list of films produced in Pakistan in 2004 (see 2004 in film) and in the Urdu language.

== 2004 ==
Title	Director	Cast	Genre	Notes
2004
Amman Ke Dushman	Iqbal Kashmiri	Reema Khan, Shaan Shahid, Saud		
Budha Bigra Jaye		Aleena, Rambo, Naveed		
Daaman Aur Chingari		Saima, Izhar, Nargis		
Hum Ek Hain	Syed Noor	Shaan; Saima	Drama	A very sensitive story about Shia-Sunni conflict in Pakistan. The film was released in November, 2004
Jan Leva		Sana, Moamar Rana		
Khamosh Pani	Sabiha Sumar	Kiron Kher, Aamir Ali Malik, Arsad Mahmud	Drama	Film Released on February 25, 2004 (France)
Loha		Samia, Shaan, Rambo		
Rabba Ishq Na Howe		Sami, Asima, Nimra		
Salakhain	Shehzad Rafiq	Zara Sheikh, Meera, Saud, Ahmed Butt	Action; Drama	The film was released on August 13, 2004
Sassi Punno	Hassan Askari	Sana, Moamar Rana		

== See also ==
- 2004 in Pakistan
