= Pajero Group =

- Directed by: Idrees Khan
- Written by: Nasir Adib
- Produced by: M Shafiq Butt; Faqeer Muhammad
- Starring: Sultan Rahi; Saima; Ghulam Mohiuddin; Neeli; Izhar Qazi; Mustafa Qureshi; Adeeb; Bahar; Shafqat Cheema; Humayun Qureshi; Zahir Shah
- Narrated by: M Shafiq Butt
- Cinematography: Ghazanfar Ali
- Edited by: Khalid Buki
- Music by: Wajahat Attre
- Production companies: Evernew Studio; Shaab Studio
- Distributed by: Shafiq Films
- Release date: 22 July 1994 (Pakistan)
- Running time: 143 minutes
- Country: Pakistan
- Languages: Urdu&Punjabi, Double version

Pajero Group (Urdu and Punjabi: پجارو گروپ) is a 1994 Pakistani action and musical film directed by Idrees Khan and produced by Shafiq Butt. Film starring actor Sultan Rahi, Ghulam Mohiuddin, Izhar Qazi, Mustafa Qureshi and Humayun Qureshi, Edited by Mohammad Ashiq Ali Hujra Shah Muqeem.

== Cast ==
- Sultan Rahi as (Nadar Khan)
- Neeli as (Crime Reporter)
- Ghulam Mohiuddin as (Babar)
- Saima as (Love of Babar)
- Izhar Qazi as (Anwar)
- Mustafa Qureshi as (DSP Haq Nawaz Jhangva)
- Humayun Qureshi as (Halku Khan)
- Adeeb as (Haji Sahib)
- Talish as (Khawaja Sahib)
- Bahar as (Mai Rehmatey)
- Shafqat Cheema as (Haji Rasheed)
- Raseela as (Munshi)
- Achhi Khan
- Nasrrullah Butt as (Falak Sher)
- Afzal Khan as (Sain Baba)
- Zahir Shah - Guest's
- Altaf Khan

== Soundtrack ==
The music of Pajero Group is composed by Wajahat Attray with lyrics penned by Waris Ludhianvi.

Pajero Group

Soundtrack album by Wajahat Attray
- Released: 22 July 1994
- Recorded: 1994
- Genre: Film soundtrack
- Length: 25:22
- Language: Punjabi
- Label: EMI Musical
- Director: Idrees Khan
- Producer: Azhar Khan
- Compiler: Waris Ludhianvi

Wajahat Attray chronology
Daku Raaj	Pajero Group	International Luteray

=== Track listing ===
No.	Title	Artist(s)	Length
1.	"Teri Meri Dharkan, Pyar Which Kho Gai"	Noor Jehan & A Nayyar	5:00
2.	"Paranda Besabra, Te Kulgia Bekabra"	Noor Jehan	4:41
3.	"Bori Bori Teri Nazar Bori"	Saira Naseem	4:40
4.	"Weeni Maroor We"	Noor Jehan	4:06
5.	"Jawani Sarr Bal Gai"	Noor Jehan	5:02
6.	"Bhaga Waliyo Naam Jappo Mula Naam"	Anwar Rafi	6:05
