= Cobra (1991 film) =

Pakistani film

- Directed by: Shahid Rana
- Written by: Saleem Murad
- Screenplay by: Saleem Murad
- Story by: Saleem Murad
- Produced by: Malik Saleem; Mian Mohammad Ali; Malik Qadeer
- Starring: Sultan Rahi; Gori; Ghulam Mohiuddin; Nadira; Humayun Qureshi; Abid Ali; Asif Khan
- Narrated by: Malik Shahbaaz; Malik Iqbal
- Cinematography: Iqbal Nimmi
- Edited by: K.D. Mirza
- Music by: Zulfiqar Ali
- Production company: Khalifa Productions
- Release date: 9 August 1991
- Running time: 155 minutes
- Country: Pakistan
- Language: Punjabi

Cobra is a 1991 Pakistani Punjabi-language action thriller film directed by Shahid Rana and produced by Malik Saleem, starring Sultan Rahi, Gori, Ghulam Mohiuddin, Nadira, Abid Ali, Asif Khan and Humayun Qureshi. The film is a remake of 1978's Indian film Don, starring Amitabh Bachchan. Sultan Rahi portrays dual roles as Cobra and Stuntman Akbar Khan.

== Synopsis ==
Inspector Khan (Abid Ali) is in pursuit of crime boss Cobra (Sultan Rahi) and his gang. When Cobra gets killed in a police encounter, Inspector Khan trains his lookalike to pose as gang boss and help nab his gang.

== Cast ==
- Sultan Rahi as Cobra / Akbar Khan (double role)
- Gori as Maria
- Ghulam Mohiuddin as Inspector Arshad
- Nadira as Uzmaa
- Humayun Qureshi as Dr. Diyang
- Abid Ali as Inspector Khan
- Asif Khan as DIG Police / Chief
- Naghma as Akbar's mother
- Salma Agha as Singer Salma (Guest Appearance)

== Soundtrack ==
Song	Singers	Time	Notes
"Chummi Leindi Aei Hawa"	Salma Agha	5:01	Popular song
"Kuri Saan Kuwari Lag Gayi Yaari"	Noor Jehan	5:04	Popular song
"Aa Gya Cobra"	Salma Agha	5:41	Popular song
"Tu Tay Meri Akhiyan Di Neend Churai"	Noor Jehan	5:00	Popular song
"Kagaz Kalam Leyaa"		4:06	Popular song
"We Chutti Le Le Ek Din Di"		5:00	Popular song
