= Sarkata Insaan =

1994 film

Sar Kata Insaan
- Theatrical release poster
- Directed by: Saeed Rizvi
- Produced by: Saeed Rizvi
- Starring: Babra Sharif; Ghulam Mohiuddin; Izhar Qazi
- Cinematography: Saeed Rizvi
- Music by: Kamal Ahmed
- Production company: Novitas
- Distributed by: Al-Farooq Movies
- Release date: 22 April 1994
- Running time: 148 minutes
- Country: Pakistan
- Language: Urdu

Sarkata Insaan (Urdu: سر کٹا انسان, transl. Beheaded man) is a 1994 Pakistani science fiction horror action drama film directed, produced and visual effects created by Saeed Rizvi.

The film stars Babra Sharif, Ghulam Mohiuddin and Qavi Khan in lead roles.

== Cast ==
- Babra Sharif
- Ghulam Mohiuddin
- Qavi Khan
- Izhar Qazi
- Ajab Gul
- Sapna
- Talish
- Saeed Khan Rangeela
- Adeeb
- Munir Zareef
- Asif Khan
- Nayyar Sultana
- Gibran Haider Rizvi

== Release ==
Sarkata Insaan was released on 22 April 1994. In September 2023, a remastered version of the film was released in cinemas across Pakistan.

== Awards ==
This film won four Nigar Awards in 1994 – Best Film of 1994, Best Actor, Best Supporting Actress and Best Songwriter.
