= Haseena Atom Bomb =

- DVD cover
- Directed by: Saeed Ali Khan
- Starring: Badar Munir; Musarrat Shaheen; B. Bakht; Shahnaz
- Release date: 1990
- Country: Pakistan
- Language: Pashto

Haseena Atom Bomb is a 1990 cult Pakistani film directed by Saeed Ali Khan. Originally recorded in Pashto on a low-budget, the film was subsequently dubbed in Urdu, becoming a national blockbuster.
