= Darra Khaibar =

- Starring: Asif Khan; Surayya Khan
- Release date: 1971
- Country: Pakistan
- Language: Pashto

Darra Khaibar is a Pakistani Pashto film, starring Asif Khan and Surayya Khan. The film, directed by Mumtaz Ali Khan and produced by Habib Ullah Productions, was released on 14 May, 1971.

== Cast ==
- Asif Khan
- Surayya Khan

Gulzar alam
