= Izhar Qazi =

Pakistani actor and singer

- اظہار قاضی
- Born: Izhar Qazi; 16 September 1957; Khadda Market, Karachi, Pakistan
- Died: 23 December 2007 (aged 50); Gulistan-e-Jauhar, Karachi, Pakistan
- Resting place: Model Colony graveyard, Karachi, Pakistan
- Occupations: Actor; Singer
- Years active: 1982–2005
- Awards: Nigar Award (2 times), National Award, Graduate Award, Bolan Award

Izhar Qazi (16 September 1957 – 23 December 2007) was a Pakistani actor and singer. His most famous films were Love in Nepal, Aalmi Jasoos, Khazana, and Sarkata Insaan. He was a two-time recipient of the Nigar award. Most of his films were in Urdu and Punjabi. He was also a singer; he recorded a studio album, Zara Aake Dekho To, that was re-released by EMI Pakistan in 2014.

== Early life and education ==
Qazi was born in Khadda Market, Karachi. He began his professional career as an engineer at the Pakistan Steel Mills.

== Career ==
=== Television roles (early 1980s) ===
He was introduced to television drama writer Fatima Surayya Bajia by his manager, Syed Abdul Munim. Bajia was looking for a new face for television, and Qazi's resemblance to Indian actor Amitabh Bachchan immediately caught her attention. She invited him to audition and he made his acting and television debut in 1982, starring in the family drama Ana. He appeared as the romantic lead alongside Mehreen Ilahi, Shakeel, and Ghazala Kaifee. He later appeared in the serials Daira and Gardish with Shakeel and Saqi.

=== Leading film roles in Urdu and Punjabi cinema (mid-1980s to mid-1990s) ===
After achieving television success, Qazi transitioned into the Lollywood film industry in 1986. His film debut as the lead role in Nazar Shabab's Ruby, alongside Mustafa Qureshi, Shafi Mohammad, Sabeeta, and Rangeela. The film was met with critical acclaim. Qazi's role in the film was also notable because Jawed Sheikh had originally been cast for the lead role, but quit to travel to India with his then wife Salma Agha. Around the same time, Shiekh had also been cast in the film Bangkok Ke Chor. Director Jan Mohammad fired Shiekh and awarded the role to Qazi. Qazi's collaborations with Jan Muhammad included popular films including Manila Ki Bijlyan, Roop Ki Rani, and Choron Ka Baadshah. He also teamed up with Sultan Rahi in Punjabi films.

=== Last years ===
Qazi retired from the film industry in 2003. His last acting role was in the series Pani Pe Naam, which aired on PTV. He was dismayed by the poor quality of Lollywood films and local film industry politics. He then concentrated on his real estate business.

== Personal life ==
Qazi had four daughters and a son. He was active in several literary organizations.

On 23 December 2007, he suffered a heart attack while singing at the wedding of his sister-in-law in Gulistan-e-Jauhar, Karachi. He died at a local hospital later the same day. He was buried at Model Colony graveyard.

== Awards and recognition ==
Qazi was nominated for Best Actor at the Lux Style Awards in 2004 for her performance in Paani Pe Naam. He also won the Graduate Award and Bolan Award. He was awarded Nigar Awards for his performances in Sakhi baadshan and Bakhtawar. He also received the National Award for best actor for his role in Masood Butt's Chiragh Bali.

== Filmography ==
=== Films ===
Year	Title	Language	Co-star(s)
1986	Ruby	Urdu	Sabeeta, Rangeela
1986	Bangkok ke Chor	Urdu	Sabeeta
1987	Love in Nepal	Urdu	Shabnam
1987	Dulari	Punjabi	Anjuman, Sultan Rahi
1987	Himmatwala	Urdu	Sabeeta
1987	Manila ki bijliyan	Urdu	Sabeeta
1987	Mera Insaaf	Urdu	Babra Sharif
1987	Nachay Nagin	Punjabi	Nadira, Ismael Shah, Sultan Rahi
1987	Nijaat	Urdu	Sabeeta
1987	Baaghi Haseena	Urdu	Babra Sharif
1988	Bardasht	Punjabi	Anjuman
1988	Choron ka Baadshah	Urdu	Kaveeta
1989	Manila ke Janbaaz	Urdu	Kaveeta
1989	Rakhwala	Punjabi	Nadira, Sultan Rahi
1990	Jangi	Punjabi	Anjuman, Sultan Rahi
1990	KalaPani	Punjabi, Urdu	Babra Sharif, Ajab Gul
1990	Manga	Punjabi	Anjuman, Sultan Rahi
1990	NumberOne	Punjabi, Urdu	Salma Agha
1990	Insaniyat Kay Dushman	Urdu	Anjuman, Sultan Rahi, Nadeem
1990	Leader	Urdu	Kaveeta, Nadeem, Hamayun
1991	Akhri shikar	Punjabi, Urdu	Babra Sharif, Salma Agha
1991	Bakhtawar	Punjabi, Urdu	Neeli, Saima, Ghulam Moh
1991	Chiragh Bali	Punjabi	Anjuman, Sultan Rahi
1991	Teen Yakke teen Chhakke	Punjabi, Urdu	Neeli, Sultan Rahi
1991	Aalmi Jasoos	Punjabi, Urdu	Kaveeta, Ghulam Mohayuddin
1991	Watan Kay Rakhwalay	Urdu	Nadira, Saima, Sultan Rahi, Nadeem
1992	Suhaagraat	Punjabi, Urdu	Kaveeta
1992	Abdullah The Great	Punjabi, Urdu	Neeli, Nadeem, Saima, Sultan Rahi
1993	Ghunda	Punjabi	Reema, Sultan Rahi
1993	Ghunghru do Kalashankoff	Pashto	Salma Agha
1993	Iradah	Punjabi, Urdu	Madiah Shah, Sultan Rahi
1993	Jannat	Urdu	Rubi Niazi, Mohsin Khan
1993	Nagin Sapera	Punjabi, Urdu	Madiha Shah, Jan Rambo
1993	Sapni	Punjabi, Urdu	Nadia, Sonia
1993	Betaj Badshah	Punjabi, Urdu	Neeli, Reema, Nadeem, Abid Ali
1993	Zamana	Punjabi, Urdu	Sultan Rahi, Neeli, Javed Sheikh, Gori
1994	Zameen Aasman	Punjabi, Urdu	Nadeem, Sultan Rahi, Madiha Shah, Bahar
1994	Pajero Group	Punjabi, Urdu	Sultan Rahi, Ghulam Mohiuddin, Saima, Mustafa Qureshi, Neeli, Humayun Qureshi
1994	Laila	Punjabi, Urdu	Nadira
1994	Sanam Bewafa	Punjabi, Urdu	Madiha Shah, Sahiba
1994	Sarkata Insaan	Urdu	
1995	Khazana	Urdu	Nadeem, Sahiba
1995	Jungle Ka Qanoon	Punjabi, Urdu	Saima, Reema, Sultan Rahi, Nadeem
1997	Ghail	Urdu	Babra Sharif, Ghulam Mohiuddin
1997	Kala Raj	Punjabi	Saima, Sultan Rahi
1997	Kalay Naag	Punjabi	Saima
1997	Aulad ki Qasam	Urdu	Reema, Babur Ali, Shabnam, Nadeem
1999	Hawwa ki Beti	Urdu	Sapna, Nargis
2004	Daaman aur Chingari	Urdu	Saima, Nargis
2005	Parcham	Urdu	Sana, Shaan, Arbaz Khan

=== Television ===
Year	Title	Network
1982	Ana	PTV
1983	Daira	PTV
1987	Gardish	PTV
1993	Zakham	PTV
2003	Pani Pe Naam	PTV

== Discography ==
Studio album

- Zara Aake Dekho To (EMI Pakistan, 2014)

== See also ==
- List of Lollywood actors
