= Mushkil =

1995 Pakistani film

- Directed by: Javed Sheikh
- Written by: Syed Noor; Javed Sheikh
- Produced by: Abdul Habib
- Starring: Ghulam Mohiuddin; Nadeem; Neeli; Javed Sheikh; Behroze Sabzwari; Talish; Meera; Asif Khan
- Music by: Amjad Bobby
- Distributed by: Habib Jalib Films
- Release date: 31 March 1995
- Country: Pakistan
- Language: Urdu

Mushkil (Urdu: مشکل, lit. difficult) is a 1995 Pakistani Urdu-language film which was released in 1995 across theaters in Pakistan. The film dealt with the issue of child-camel-jockeys illegally trafficked from the third world countries into numerous Arab countries.

The super-hit film music was composed by Amjad Bobby. Hit tracks included Dil Ho Gaya Hai Tera Deewana and Mushkil Hai Bara Mushkil Hai. This film was directed by Javed Sheikh.

== Cast ==
- Neeli
- Javed Sheikh
- Behroze Sabzwari
- Talish
- Asif Khan
- Meera
- Ghulam Mohiuddin (Guest appearance)
- Nadeem (Guest appearance)

== Soundtrack ==
The lyrics were written by Masroor Anwar and Saleem A. Saleem and music was composed by Amjad Bobby.

- Dil Ho Gya Hay, Tera Deevana (Female version) sung by Mehnaz Begum
- Dil Ho Gya Hay, Tera Deevana (Male version) sung by Tehseen Javed
- Tujhko Bhool Kay Zinda Rehna, Mushkil Hai Bara Mushkil sung by Mehnaz Begum, Tehseen Javed

== Awards ==
- Nigar Award for Best Actor for Javed Sheikh in Mushkil (1995 film)
