= Hathiar =

1979 film

- Directed by: M. Akram
- Story by: Nasir Adeeb
- Produced by: Tufail Imran; Salauddin Malik
- Cinematography: Parvez Khan
- Edited by: Musadik Sheikh
- Music by: Nazir Ali; Lyrics; Khawaja Pervez; Singers; Noor Jehan; Naheed Akhtar; Alam Lohar
- Production companies: Vilties Sound System; Evernew Studio
- Distributed by: S. T. R. Productions
- Release date: 1 June 1979 (Pakistan)
- Running time: 132 minutes
- Country: Pakistan
- Language: Punjabi

Hathiar (Punjabi: ہتھیار) is a 1979 Punjabi-language Pakistani film.

The film was directed by M. Akram. The composer of the songs of the film was Nazir Ali. The songs were sung by famous Pakistani singers Noor Jehan, Naheed Akhtar and Alam Lohar. The melodies were composed by Khawaja Pervez.

== Cast ==
- Sultan Rahi as (Sultan)
- Mustafa Qureshi as (Maluo)
- Aasia as (Gulabo)
- Ghazal as (Taji)
- Gori as (Rajjo)
- Alam Lohar as (Alam Lohar)
- Sabiha Khanum as (Sultan of Mother)
- Rangeela as (Lohar)
- Kamal Irani as (Justice)
- Tariq Aziz as (Police Inspector)

== Track listing ==
No.	Title	Artist(s)	Length
1.	"Tu Tay Moh Leyi Ae Sohneya Naar Patolay Wargi.."	Naheed Akhtar	4:15
2.	"Tu Gabhroo Jatt Punjab Da Teinu Kul Zamana Janda.."	Alam Lohar	4:14
3.	"Pawan Bhangray Tay Maaran Bharkan Ajj Khali Ho Geian Sarkan.."	Noor Jehan	4:12
4.	"Jee Sajna Jeedara Teri Ki Ki Sift Karan Tu Ziddi Ghora Athra.."	Noor Jehan	4:24
5.	"Sohna Yaar Taveeta Wala Main Tay Keeta Pyar Nirala.."	Noor Jehan	3:55
6.	"Akhian Milayian Teray Naal Main Sanbhi Jawani Sulla Saal Main.."	Noor Jehan	4:18
