= Nadira (Pakistani actress) =

Pakistani actress

- نادرہ
- Born: Malika Farah; 22 November 1968; Lahore, Punjab, Pakistan
- Died: 6 August 1995 (aged 26); Gulberg, Lahore, Punjab, Pakistan
- Cause of death: Shot dead by unknown gunmen
- Other name: The White Rose
- Occupations: Actress; Dancer
- Years active: 1986 – 1994
- Spouse: Malik Ijaz Hussain (m. 1993–1995)
- Children: 2

Nadira (22 November 1968 – 6 August 1995) was a Pakistani film actress and dancer, active in Punjabi and Urdu-language cinema from the mid-1980s to the mid-1990s. She was popularly known as The White Rose due to her romantic roles and graceful on-screen persona.

Born in Lahore, she made her acting debut in the Punjabi film Aakhri Jang (1986), although Nishan (1986) was released earlier and is considered her first appearance on record. Over a career spanning approximately eight years, Nadira became a prominent figure in Lollywood, noted for her expressive performances and distinctive dance style. She frequently starred opposite actors such as Sultan Rahi, Ghulam Mohiuddin, and Ismael Shah, and often played emotionally intense and dramatic roles. Her notable films include Aakhri Jang (1986), Puttar Sheran Day (1986), Baadal (1986), Nachay Nagi (1987), Meri Aavaz (1987), Commando Action (1988), Maula Bakhsh (1988), Mafroor (1988), Jagga Daku (1993), Miss Allah Rakhi (1989), 30 Mar Khan (1989), and Zakhmi Aurat (1989). In Meri Aavaz, she performed in two songs that became popular at the time. Nadira married businessman Ijaz Hussain and had two children. Following her marriage, she retired from the entertainment industry. On 6 August 1995, she was fatally shot by unidentified assailants in Liberty Market, Lahore.

== Early life ==
Nadira was born as Malika Farah on 22 November 1968 in Lahore.

== Career ==
Nadira was introduced by director Yunus Malik to the Pakistani film industry by offering her a role in his film Akhri Jang in 1986. Nadira's first film was Akhri Jang (The Last War), but director Altaf Hussain's Punjabi film Nishan (Mark) got released first, therefore, as per record, Nishan remains the first released film of Nadira.

Nadira was considered as talented actress, in film Nachay Nagin she played the best role of her life. In this film, she played the role of serpent for the first time and acclaimed a lot of fame along with the dancing hero Ismael Shah. Then she became famous for playing the role of serpent. She played role of serpent in Nachay Nagin, Nachay Jogi and Jadoo Garni.

Nadira starred in 52 films, out of which 25 enjoyed Silver jubilee, 4 enjoyed diamond jubilee and one film Akhri Jang enjoyed golden jubilee. (Note: A silver jubilee film is one shown continuously in cinemas in one city for 25 weeks.) (Note: A diamond jubilee film is one shown continuously in cinemas in one city for 60 weeks.) (Note: A golden jubilee film is one shown continuously in cinemas in one city for 50 weeks.) She was known as " The White Rose" in industry. She was considered a good dancer. During her film career she starred in 2 Urdu, 35 Punjabi, 2 Pashto and 14 double version (Punjabi/Urdu) films.

== Personal life ==
In 1993, she married a gold merchant Malik Ijaz Hussain with whom she had two children, elder daughter Rimsha Rubab & younger son Haider Ali. Nadira quit acting after marriage.

== Death ==
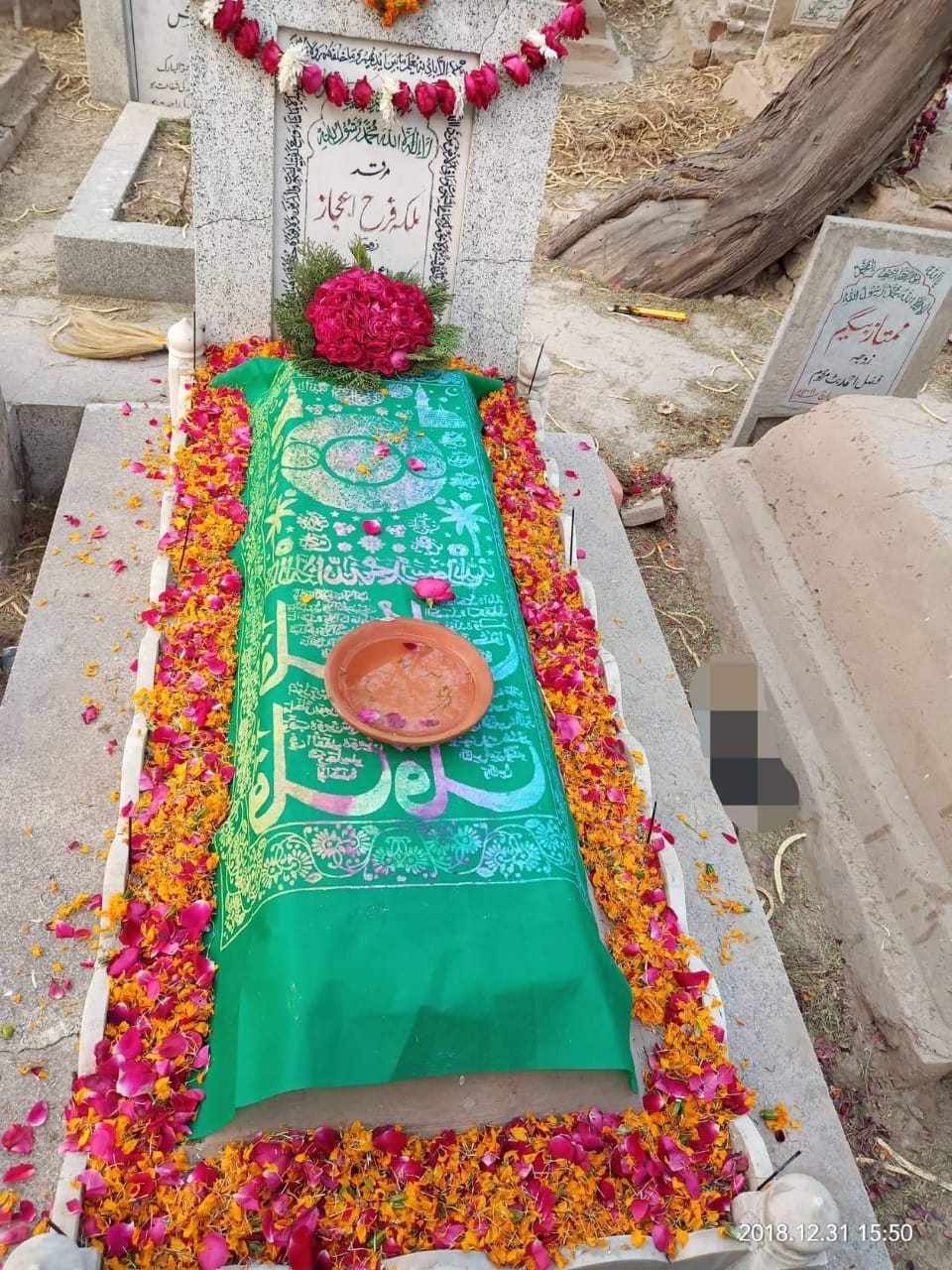
Nadira's grave, Miani Sahib Graveyard, Lahore

Nadira was shot dead by unknown robbers on 6 August 1995 near Gulberg, Lahore. Nadira and her husband were on their way home from a restaurant when the robbers stopped their car and tried to snatch the car keys. Resistance from her husband led to firing from the robbers. A bullet hit the neck of Nadira, who was in the front seat and she was killed. Accusations of murder were made against Nadira's husband, but investigation was inconclusive.

== Filmography ==
=== Film ===
#	Year	Film	Director	Language	Notes
1	1986	Nishan	Altaf Hussain	Punjabi	released first
2	1986	Akhri Jang	Yunus Malik	Punjabi	debut film
3	1986	Puttar Sheran Day	Altaf Hussain	Punjabi	
4	1987	Badal	Yunus Malik	Punjabi	
5	1987	Nachay Nagin	Haider Chaudhry	Punjabi	
6	1987	Meri Awaz	Iqbal Rizvi	Urdu	first Urdu film
7	1987	Commando Action	A. Riaz	Punjabi	
8	1988	Maula Baksh	Yunus Malik	Punjabi	
9	1988	Mafroor	Hassan Askari	Punjabi	
10	1988	Hukumat	Haider Chaudhry	Punjabi	
11	1988	Tohfa	Daud Butt	Punjabi	
12	1988	Bardasht	Haider Chaudhry	double version	
13	1989	Yarana	Yunus Malik	Punjabi	
14	1989	Zabardast	Haider Chaudhry	Punjabi	
15	1989	Miss Allah Rakhi	Haider Chaudhry	Punjabi	
16	1989	Karma	Jahangir Qaisar	Punjabi	
17	1989	Rakhwala	Waheed Dar	Punjabi	
18	1989	Mera Challenge	Azmat Nawaz	Punjabi	
19	1989	Nagin Jogi	Masood Butt	double version	
20	1989	Zulm Da Suraj	M. Javed Iqbal	Punjabi	
21	1989	Tees Maar Khan	Iqbal Kāshmiri	Punjabi	
22	1989	Zakhmi Aurat	Iqbal Kāshmiri	double version	
23	1989	Mujrim	Haider Chaudhry	Punjabi	
24	1990	Jailor	Daud Butt	Punjabi	
25	1990	Hifazat	Haider Chaudhry	Punjabi	
26	1990	Puttar Jaggay Da	Hassan Askari	Punjabi	
27	1990	Waqt	M. Idrees Khan	Punjabi	
28	1990	Raja	Iqbal Kāshmiri	double version	
29	1990	Marshal	Yunus Malik	Punjabi	
30	1990	Jang Baz	Irshad Sajid	Punjabi	
31	1991	Doulat Kay Pujari	M. Idrees Khan	double version	
32	1991	Jadoo Garni	Hasnain	Punjabi	
33	1991	Husn Ka Chor	Altaf Hussain	double version	
34	1991	Lakhan	Masood Butt	Punjabi	
35	1991	Watan Kay Rakhwalay	Hasnain	double version	
36	1991	Lahori Badmash	Shahid Rana	Punjabi	
37	1991	Nadira	Altaf Hussain	double version	
38	1991	Cobra	Shahid Rana	double version	
39	1991	Meri Jang	Muhammad Rasheed Dogar	Punjabi	
40	1991	Sher Afgan	Yunus Malik	Punjabi	
41	1991	Shere Badmash	Saeed Ali Khan	Pashto	(Note: Some scenes of her Punjabi films were included in this film, but Nadira didn't acted in the film formally.)
42	1992	Joshilay	Imtiaz Rana	Urdu	
43	1992	Mohammad Khan	Kaifee	Punjabi	
44	1992	Qanoon Zamapa Laske	Inayat Ullah Khan	Pashto	first Pashto film
45	1992	Sher Jang	Yunus Malik	Punjabi	
46	1992	Mehbooba	Hasnain	double version	
47	1992	Godfather	Parvez Rana	double version	
48	1992	Mera Inteqam	Faiz Malik	Punjabi	
49	1993	Jagga Daku	Yunus Malik	Punjabi	
50	1993	Aadil	Altaf Hussain	double version	
51	1993	Ilaqa Ghair	Mumtaz Ali Khan	double version	
52	1994	Laila	Nazrul Islam	double version	last film

== Awards and recognition ==
Year	Award	Category	Result	Title	Ref.
1991	Nigar Award	Best Actress	Won	Watan Kay Rakhwalay	
