= Gori (actress) =

Pakistani film actress

- گوری
- Born: Gauhar Afroz; 14 September 1965 (age 61); Multan, Pakistan
- Occupation: Actress
- Years active: 1979–2003
- Children: 1
- Relatives: Anjuman (sister); Lucky Ali (brother-in-law); Mobin Malik (brother-in-law)

Gauhar Afroz (also known as Gori; Urdu: گوری) is a former Pakistani film actress. Gori acted in Punjabi, Pashto, and Urdu films including Hathiar (1979), Zara Si Baat (1982), Super Girl (1989), Mujrim (1989), and Chattan (1992).

== Early life ==
Gori's parents were from Ahmedpur East. They later settled in Multan, where Gori was born on 14 September 1965.

== Career ==
In 1979, Gori started her film career with her debut Hathiar. The film was a hit, starring Sultan Rahi, Sabiha Khanum, and Mustafa Qureshi. She was a successful and popular actress in the 1980s and 1990s. Gori was very selective in her work, and worked in about 56 movies. After the decline of Urdu cinema in the early 2000s, in 2003 she worked in her last Punjabi film, Khar Damagh Gujjar, and quit the Pakistani film industry after the film was released.

== Personal life ==
Gori's older sister Anjuman is an actress and she has one daughter.

== Filmography ==
=== Film ===
Year	Film	Language
1979	Hathiar	Punjabi
1982	Zara Si Baat	Urdu
1983	Insaf Ka Tarazoo	Punjabi
1983	Dushman Pyara	Punjabi
1984	Chann Cheeta	Punjabi
1985	Nikah	Punjabi
1986	Akbar Khan	Punjabi
1986	Andha Qanoon	Punjabi
1986	Mela	Punjabi
1988	Allah Ditta	Punjabi
1988	Hukumat	Punjabi
1989	Super Girl	Punjabi
1989	Phoolan Devi	Punjabi
1989	Nagin Jogi	Punjabi / Urdu
1989	Mohabbat Ho To Aisi Ho	Urdu
1989	Nangi Talwar	Punjabi
1989	Mazdoor	Punjabi
1989	Mujrim	Punjabi
1990	Babul	Punjabi
1990	Sultana	Punjabi
1990	Tezab	Punjabi / Urdu
1990	Hifazat	Punjabi
1990	Khandani Badmash	Punjabi
1990	Loha	Punjabi
1990	Sher Dil	Punjabi
1991	Action	Punjabi
1991	Falak Sher	Punjabi
1991	Gandasa	Punjabi
1991	Chattan	Punjabi / Urdu
1991	Lahori Badmash	Punjabi
1991	Badmash Thug	Punjabi / Urdu
1991	Cobra	Punjabi
1991	Behram	Punjabi
1991	Mastan Khan	Punjabi / Urdu
1991	Gulfam	Punjabi / Urdu
1991	Hashar Nashar	Pashto
1991	Shooka	Punjabi
1992	Shera Pandi	Punjabi
1992	6'Ka	Punjabi
1992	Tarazoo	Punjabi
1992	Agg day Golay	Punjabi
1992	Sanwal	Punjabi
1992	Deputy	Punjabi
1992	Pattan	Punjabi
1992	Abida	Punjabi / Urdu
1992	Gawah Tay Badmash	Punjabi
1992	Chattan	Pashto
1993	Katwal	Punjabi
1993	Roshan Jatt	Punjabi
1993	Faqeera	Punjabi
1994	Sher Punjab Da	Punjabi
1994	Saranga	Punjabi
1994	Ziddi Gujjar	Punjabi
1995	Qalandra	Punjabi
1996	Choran Da Shehanshah	Punjabi
2003	Khar Damagh Gujjar	Punjabi

== See also ==
- Anjuman
