= Musarrat Shaheen =

Pakistani actress and politician

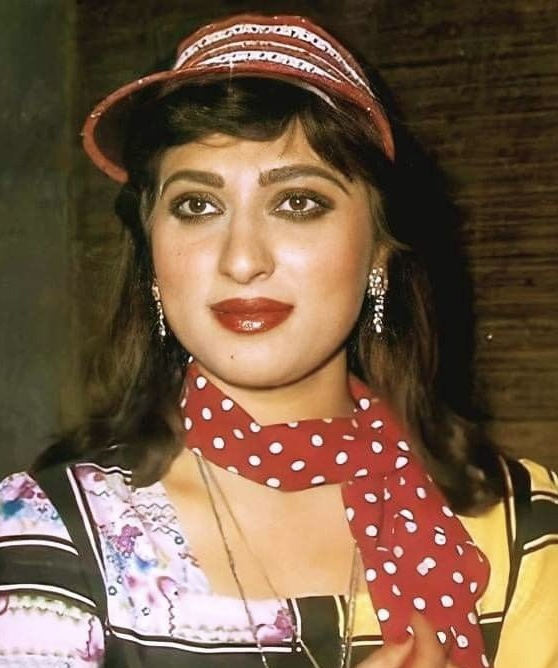
- Musarrat in the 80s.
- Born: 1958 (age 67–68); Dera Ismail Khan
- Occupation: Actress
- Years active: 1975-1996
- Notable work: Dulhan Ek Raat Ki, Black Cat, Accident, Bharusa, Khofnak

Musarrat Shaheen is a Pakistani actress-turned-politician from Khyber Pakhtunkhwa. She is the chairwoman of the Pakistan Tehreek-e-Masawat. Apart from politics, she was a noted actress in Pashto cinema, and the first heroine of the Pashto cinema in Pakistan.

Some of her films include Haseena Atom Bomb, Black Cat, Bharusa, Dulhan Ek Raat Ki, Amber, Jaan Ki Bazi, Shikari and Accident. She rose to fame after appearing in the 1975 film Dulhan Ek Raat Ki.

She frequently acted alongside Badar Munir. They appeared in numerous films throughout the 70s, 80s and 90s.

== Career ==
Shaheen's first role was in a Punjabi film called Aaj Ki Baat. She then appeared in the film Dulhan Ek Raat Ki as a bar dancer. She received critical acclaim and attention for the role. After appearing in the film, her career took off.

She worked in at least 400 Pashto films. She has also worked in numerous Urdu films, dramas and other projects. Her most popular works include Haseena Atom Bomb, Aawara and Dhamki.

In 2000, Musarrat formed her own political party Pakistan Tehreek-e-Masawat (PTM). Although she has not achieved electoral success, she has contested elections against Fazal-ur-Rehman in every election.
