= Sitara (actress) =

Pakistani former film actress

- ستارہ
- Occupation: Actress
- Years active: 1984–1991
- Relatives: Shamsa Kanwal (sister)

Sitara is a Pakistani former film actress known for her works mostly in Punjabi and Urdu cinema.

== Career ==
She entered the film industry in 1984 and made her debut with the Punjabi film Dil Maa Da. During her film career she appeared in 10 Urdu, 19 Punjabi and 4 Pashto films.

== Personal life ==
Sitara married the Pashto films action instructor Puppoo in 1991. He was murdered a year after their marriage.

== Filmography ==
#	Year	Title	Language	Director	Notes
1	1984	Dil Maa Da	Punjabi	Mohammad Saleem	debut
2	1985	Direct Hawaldar	Urdu	Irfan Khoosat	first Urdu film
3	1986	Naya Toofan	Punjabi	Iqbal Ali	
4	1986	First Blood	Urdu	Nazad Ali Fartash	
5	1987	Jugnu	Punjabi	Faiz Malik	
6	1987	Deewar	Urdu	Amman Mirza	
7	1987	Da Juvand Bazi	Pashto	Inayat Ullah Khan	first Pashto film
8	1987	Dulari	Punjabi	Haidar Chodhary	
9	1987	Janbaz	Punjabi	Altaf Hussain	
10	1987	Nijat	Urdu	Hassan Askari	
11	1987	Iqrar	Urdu	Inayat Ullah Khan	
12	1987	Aeitbar	Pashto	Inayat Ullah Khan	
13	1987	Meri Awaz	Urdu	Iqbal Rizvi	
14	1988	Inteha	Urdu	Qaisar Mehmood	
15	1988	Allah Dad	Punjabi	Masood Butt	
16	1988	Qismat Wala	Urdu	Agha Hussaini	
17	1988	Chann Punjab Da	Punjab	Mohammad Saleem	
18	1988	Khan Badmash	Pashto	Saeed Ali Khan	
19	1989	Aakhri Qatal	Punjabi	Aslam Irani	
20	1989	Bilawal	Punjabi	Kaifee	
21	1989	Khuda Bakhsh	Punjabi	Nasir Hussain	
22	1989	Allah Khair	Punjabi	Mohammad Ashraf Butt	
23	1990	Gori Dian Jhanjhran	Punjabi	Usman Peerzada	
24	1990	Jurrat	Punjabi	Waheed Dar	
25	1990	Loha	Punjab	Waheed Dar	
26	1990	Khatarnak	Punjabi	Akram Khan	
27	1990	Makhan Gujjar	Punjabi	Yunus Malik	
28	1990	Chann Badmash	Punjabi	Azmat Nawaz	
29	1991	Meri Jang	Punjabi	Muhammad Rasheed Dogar	
30	1996	Shenogay	Pashto	Irfan Shah	last
