= Adeeb =

Pakistani film actor (1926–2006)

- ادیب
- Born: Muzaffar Ahmed; 1926; Bombay, British India
- Died: 26 May 2006 (aged 80); Lahore, Punjab, Pakistan
- Occupation: film actor
- Spouse: Tani Begum (divorced)

Muzaffar Adeeb (1926 – 26 May 2006), known mononymously as Adeeb, was a Pakistani film actor. He appeared in 38 Indian films from 1940 to 1962, although he did not start performing in films very actively until the 1950s. In 1962, he shifted from Bombay (now Mumbai), India, to Lahore, Pakistan and resumed his film career that lasted until his death with over 500 films to his credit.

== Early life and career ==
Adeeb was born in Bombay in a conservative Pathan family from Kashmir. His family had moved to Bombay before the independence of Pakistan in 1947 and that is where the actor in him emerged, after the completion of his Master's Degree in Urdu literature from Bombay University, Maharashtra. Unlike his contemporaries, scriptwriting was the first love of Adeeb, who worked in the scriptwriting department with Raj Kapoor's father, Prithviraj Kapoor, in Prithvi Theatre and later with Indian National Theatre as an assistant director. It was during this time that he learned the basics of acting which later helped him entertain two generations of audience.

Although he worked in minor roles in his initial career, it was Zia Sarhadi's Footpath (1953) that gave him his first breakthrough role opposite Dilip Kumar, Meena Kumari and Anwar Hussain (Nargis's brother). He worked in 30 films during his stay in India, including Mehndi, Pak Daman (1956) and Jung, before migrating to Pakistan in 1962, on the insistence of director Akbar Ali Akku and actor/director Iqbal Yusuf, son of Adeeb's close friend, director S.M. Yusuf. He settled in Karachi and later moved to Lahore in search of roles which kept pouring in from the 1960s until his last film – Syed Noor's super-hit Majajan (2006).

In an era when on-screen villainy in Pakistani films was ruled by good looking villains such as Aslam Pervaiz, Masood Akhtar and even Mohammad Ali (in his initial films), Adeeb made his entry with Daal Mein Kala (1964), which was directed by Iqbal Yusuf and featured Syed Kamal and Bahar Begum in the lead along with Nirala and Mohammad Ali.

In the coming years, he became a close friend of Mohammad Ali and the two acted in numerous successful films such as Kaneez (1965 film), Aadil (1966) and Baghi Sardar (1966), Hatim Tai (1967), Mahal (1968), Naaz (1969), Aansoo Ban Gaye Moti (1970), Dushman (1974), Shirin Farhad (1975), Haider Ali (1979), Josh, Sangram (1981), Zanjeer (1986) with Rocky Dada being their last film together in 1987.

He was at ease in both Urdu and Punjabi films, playing memorable roles in countless films opposite other actors such as Sultan Rahi in Maula Jatt (1979) and Andaata, Waheed Murad in Eid Mubarak (1965) and Kaneez, Saaz Aur Awaaz (1965), Rishta Hai Pyar Ka (1967), Aik Nagina (1969), Afsana (1970) and Dushman (1974), Syed Kamal in Daal Main Kaala (1962) and Shab Bakhair and Nadeem in Talaash (1986), Ustadon Kay Ustad (1990) and Khazana (1995). Late directors – Rangeela's Diya Aur Toofan and Riaz Shahid's Gharnata and Yeh Aman (both 1971) – gave Adeeb tailor-made roles in their films to show his true potential. He was one of the few actors to work with actor Shaan's father, Riaz Shahid, and portray the character of his on-screen father.

During his last years, he was more active on stage than in films and depicted the role of Sir Syed Ahmed Khan in one of his last TV plays. In a career spanning over 50 years, Adeeb featured in more than 500 films, depicting villainous roles in different shades such as a deceiving brother, cruel father, nasty husband, dishonest friend and brutal landlord.

== Personal life ==
Adeeb married actress Tani Begum but later they both filed for divorce citing irreconcilable differences but remained on good terms.

== Death ==
Adeeb died on 26 May 2006, at the Punjab Institute of Cardiology, Lahore, where he was admitted after suffering a heart attack the previous week.

== Filmography ==
| Title | Released | Language |
|---|---|---|
| Ashiana | 1964 | Urdu |
| Eid Mubarak | 1965 | Urdu |
| Dil Ke Tukre | 1965 | Urdu |
| Aakhri Chattan | 1970 | Urdu |
| Aansoo Ban Gaey Moti | 1970 | Urdu |
| Love in Jungle | 1970 | Urdu |
| Naya Savera | 1970 | Urdu |
| Shahi Faqir | 1970 | Urdu |
| Takht-o-Taj | 1970 | Urdu |
| Tikka Mathe Da | 1970 | Punjabi |
| Roshni (film) | 1975 | Urdu |
| Sultana Daku | 1975 | Punjabi |
| Chitra Te Shera | 1976 | Punjabi |
| Ranga Daku | 1978 | Punjabi |
| Maula Jatt | 1979 | Punjabi |
| Hathiar | 1979 | Punjabi |
| Wehshi Gujjar | 1979 | Punjabi |
| General Bakht Khan | 1979 | Urdu |
| Behram Daku | 1980 | Punjabi |
| Sher Khan | 1981 | Punjabi |
| Jeedar | 1981 | Punjabi |
| Dara Baloch | 1983 | Punjabi |
| Jatt Te Dogar | 1983 | Punjabi |
| Moti Dogar | 1983 | Punjabi |
| Sher Mama | 1983 | Punjabi |
| Kalia | 1984 | Punjabi |
| Pukar | 1984 | Punjabi |
| Ghulami | 1985 | Punjabi |
| Shah Behram | 1985 | Punjabi |
| Joora | 1986 | Punjabi |
| Gernail Singh | 1987 | Punjabi |
| Sher Dil | 1990 | Punjabi |
| Ustadon Ke Ustad | 1990 | Urdu |
| Gandasa | 1991 | Punjabi |
| Riaz Gujjar | 1991 | Punjabi |
| Akri Shehzada | 1993 | Punjabi |
| Pajero Group | 1994 | Punjabi/Urdu |
| Sher Punjab Da | 1994 | Punjabi |
| Ghunda Raj | 1994 | Punjabi |
| Sarkata Insaan | 1994 | Urdu |

== See also ==
- List of Lollywood actors
