= Ismael Shah =

Pakistani actor

- اسماعیل شاہ
- Born: Ismael Shah; 22 May 1962; Pishin District, Balochistan, Pakistan
- Died: 29 October 1992 (aged 30); Quetta, Balochistan, Pakistan
- Occupation: Actor
- Years active: 1975–1992

Ismael Shah (22 May 1962 – 29 October 1992) was a Pakistani film and TV actor known for his movies including "Baghi Qaidi"(1986), and "Nachay Naagin"(1989).

== Early life and family ==
Ismael Shah was born in Pishin District, Baluchistan in 1962. He belonged to a Syed family that had migrated first from Kashmir to Afghanistan and then to Baluchistan.

== Acting career ==
Ismael Shah started his acting career in Baluchi dramas from PTV Quetta center in 1975. His first Urdu TV play was, "Regbaan". In 1980, he became famous for his portrayal of a historical character in the PTV drama serial Shaheen, based on the acclaimed novel by Naseem Hijazi. His cinema debut was "Baghi Qaidi" which was released in 1986. It was an action thriller that went well on the box office. This movie opened the doors of Lollywood for him. Due to his dance performances in later movies like,"Dulari"(1987) and "Nachay Nagin"(1987), Ismael Shah was tagged as the "first dancing hero of Pakistan".

== Death ==
Ismael Shah died on 29 October 1992, due to a sudden heart attack.

== Filmography ==
=== Television series ===
Year	Title	Role	Network
1980	Regbaan	Shah	PTV
1980	Shaheen	Badar Bin Mugheera	PTV
1986	Jungle	Sikandar	PTV
1986	Hazaron Raaste	Haider	PTV

=== Film ===
Ismael Shah worked in total 75 Urdu & Punjabi movies. His hit films are:

- 1986: Baghi Qaidi (Urdu)
- 1987: Dulari (Punjabi)
- 1987: Nachay Nagin (Punjabi)
- 1987: Ek Say Barh Kar Ek (Urdu)
- 1987: Iqrar (Urdu)
- 1987: Love in Nepal (Urdu)
- 1987: Lady Smuggler (Urdu)
- 1988: Mukhra (Punjabi
- 1988: Basheera in Trouble (Punjabi)
- 1988: Bardasht (Punjabi)
- 1988: Baghi Haseena (Urdu)
- 1988: Maa Bani Dulhan (Urdu)
- 1988: Shehanshah (Punjabi/Urdu double version)
- 1988: Tohfa (Punjabi)
- 1989: Josheela Dushman (Urdu)
- 1989: Manila Kay Janbaz (Urdu)
- 1990: Hifazat (Punjabi)
- 1991: Kalay Chor (Punjabi/Urdu double version)
