= Asif Khan (actor) =

Pakistani filmaker and Actor

- آصف خان
- Born: Asif Ali Khan; 1943 (age 82–83); Badrashi, Nowshera District, Khyber Pakhtunkhwa
- Occupations: Actor; Producer
- Years active: 1971–present
- Children: Arbaaz Khan (son)
- Awards: 2 Nigar Awards

Asif Ali Khan is a Pakistani film actor and producer who worked in Urdu, Pashto, and Punjabi movies from the 1970s to 2010s. His notable movies include Darra Khaibar (1971), Sargent (1977), Shola (1978), Parakh (1978), and Shaani (1989). He won 2 Nigar Awards for Best Actor during his 50 years long career. He was awarded the Pride of Performance in the field of Arts on 23 March 2015 by then President of Pakistan Mamnoon Hussain.

== Early life ==
Asif Khan was born in Badrashi village, Nowshera District, Khyber Pakhtunkhwa, in 1943.

== Career ==
Asif Khan's debut movie was a Pashto film Darra Khaibar, released in 1971. The film was an overnight success, making Asif Khan a household name. His first Urdu film was Suhaag (1972). He has worked in about 550 movies in Urdu, Pashto and Punjabi languages. He has played diverse roles both as a hero and a villain. In 1981, he produced an Urdu film Kala Dhanda Goray Log that did well at the box office.

== Personal life ==
Asif Khan was married in 1965. Of his six children, only Arbaaz Khan chose to adopt the same profession as his father.

== Selected filmography ==
=== Films ===
Asif Khan worked in 550 films including 391 Pushto, 87 Urdu, 62 Punjabi, including:

Year	Title	Language	Producer
1971	Darra Khaibar	Pashto	
1975	Zarqa	Urdu	
1976	Jagga Gujjar	Punjabi	
1977	Sargent	Urdu	
1977	Kon Sharif Kon Badmash	Punjabi	
1978	Shola	Punjabi	
1978	Parakh	Urdu	
1979	Aurat Raj	Urdu	
1980	Sangdil	Urdu	
1981	Kala Dhanda Goray Log	Urdu	Yes
1983	Sher Khan	Pashto	
1987	Ghar Kab Aao Gay	Urdu	
1989	Shaani	Urdu	
1989	Kalka	Punjabi	
1995	Mushkil	Urdu	
1996	Chief Saab	Urdu	
2005	Kyun Tum Say Itna Pyar Hay	Urdu	

=== Television series ===
Year	Title	Role	Network
2022	Sang-e-Mah	Masha'Allah Khan	Hum TV
2025	Jinn Ki Shadi Unki Shadi		Hum TV

== Awards and nominations ==
Year	Award	Category	Result	Film	Ref.
1978	Nigar Award	Best Actor	Won	Shola	
1989	Nigar Award	Best Supporting Actor	Won	Shaani	
