= Iqbal Kashmiri =

Pakistani film director (1942–2020)

- اقبال کشمیری
- Born: Iqbal Kashmiri; 1942; Lahore, British India, (now Pakistan)
- Died: 15 November 2020 (aged 77–78); Lahore, Pakistan
- Occupations: Film director and actor
- Awards: Won 3 Nigar Awards in 1971, 1986 and 1987

Iqbal Kashmiri (1942 Lahore – 15 November 2020) was a Lollywood film director. Kashmiri died as a result of kidney disease. Kashmiri "delivered a total of 84 films, in Urdu, Punjabi and Pashto."

== Early life and career ==
Kashmiri's father, Karim Bakhsh, ran a hotel near Delhi Darwaza, Lahore, Pakistan. His first foray in film was as an extra in the 1954 movie Deewar. Taxi Driver was his first film as a director, in 1970 followed by Babul (1971) and Banarsi Thag (1973).

As a young man, he was fond of movies, and was introduced to the Pakistani actor Ilyas Kashmiri who used to live in his neighborhood in Lahore. With Ilyas Kashmiri's help, he was able to play a small role in a Punjabi-language film Yakke Wali (1957). He later worked as an assistant to many veteran Pakistani film directors including Amin Malik, M. J. Rana, Khalil Qaiser, Aslam Irani and Aziz Meeruthi.

Iqbal Kashmiri played a key role in developing the film career and popularizing two major actors of Pakistani film industry – Sultan Rahi and Munawar Zarif. He is also credited with introducing actress Neeli in his film Choron Ki Baraat in 1987.

== Death ==
Iqbal Kashmiri was suffering from chronic kidney disease for some time. He was hospitalized in critical condition in the first week of November 2020. He was treated in the hospital's intensive care unit but he died on 15 November 2020. His survivors include two sons and four daughters.

== Selected filmography ==
=== As a film director ===
- Amman Ke Dushman (2004)
- Border (2002)
- Musalman (2001)
- Ghar Kab Aao Gay (2000)
- Ham Khilari Pyar Kay (2000)
- Dil Sanbhala Na Jaye (1998)
- Jo Darr Gya Woh Marr Gya (1995)
- International Luteray (1994)
- Sarfarosh (1989 film)
- Rangeelay Jasoos (1989 film)
- Choron Ki Baraat (1987 film)
- Bhabhi Dian Choorian (1986 film)
- Hum Aik Hain (1986 film), this film won eight Nigar Awards including Best Film and Best Director for Iqbal Kashmiri.
- Choron Ki Baraat won seven Nigar Awards
- Qismet (1985 film) (this was a highly successful platinum jubilee film)
- Muqaddar Ka Sikandar (film) (1984)
- Black Warrant (1982 film)
- Sharif Badmash (1975 film)
- Jadoo (1974 film)
- Banarsi Thag (1973)
- Ziddi (1973 film)
- Sasta Khoon Mehnga Pani (1974 film)
- Babul (1971 film)
- Taxi Driver (1970) (his debut film as a film director)

=== As an actor ===
- Deewar (1954) (his debut film as an actor)
- Yakke Wali (1957)

== Awards and recognition ==
- Nigar Award for Best Director in 1971 for Babul (1971 film) - a Punjabi-language film
- Nigar Award for Best Director in 1986 for Hum Aik Hain (1986 film)
- Nigar Award for Best Director in 1987 for Choron Ki Barat (1987 film)
