= Babra Sharif =

Pakistani film actress

- بابرہ شریف
- Born: Kiran Malik; 10 December 1954 (age 71); Lahore, Nankana Sahib, Punjab, Pakistan
- Occupations: Actress; Model
- Years active: 1968 – present
- Spouse: Shahid (m. 1977; div. 1978)
- Awards: Sitara-i-Imtiaz (Star of Excellence) Award by the President of Pakistan (2019); PTV National Icon Award (2023)

Babra Sharif (Urdu: بابرہ شرِیف; born 10 December 1954) is a Pakistani film actress, best known for her acting roles from the mid-1970s to the 1990s. She is one of the most popular actress of 1970s, 1980s and 1990s as well a leading actress in Urdu films.

She started her career in television commercials in 1973. She has worked with many famous names of her time, including Shahid, Nadeem, Asif Khan, Waheed Murad, Ghulam Mohyedin, Faisal Rehman, Muhammad Ali and Sultan Rahi. She had great success in Urdu films in Pakistan.

She did a variety of roles which proved her versatility as an actress. Some critics have also considered her among the best actresses of her time in Pakistan.

She worked in more than 150 movies.

== Early life ==
Sharif original name as Kiran Malik was born in Lahore, Pakistan in a middle-class family. From her early childhood, she took considerable interest in show business.

== Career ==
=== Modelling and television ===
Sharif began modelling at the age of 12; she made her presence felt in a 'Jet' washing powder commercial in 1973 and came to be known as the 'Jet' powder girl. Fair-haired, attractive and intelligent, she soon became a household name. In the same year 1973, she appeared in Mohsin Shirazi's television play, which was telecast from PTV Karachi station and also in the PTV drama Kiran Kahani, a classical slapstick comedy written by Haseena Moin and directed by Shirin Khan which had Roohi Bano, Manzoor Qureshi and Jamshed Ansari in the cast. After a long while, she came back to television in 1992 for Nadan Nadia, a Pakistan television comedy play by Anwar Maqsood.

Her appearance in the 'Lux' advertisement with the message, 'Aakhir loag hamara chehra he to deikhtay hain',(Urdu meaning: After all it is our face that people see) took her fame to the top.

=== 1970s ===
In 1974, Shamim Ara signed Sharif for her film Bhool which was scheduled to be directed by S. Suleman. At the same time, S. Suleman also signed Sharif for his film Intezaar. Both films released in 1974 but incidentally, Intezaar was released before Bhool. Hence, Sharif debuted in the film Intezaar as a supporting character. Another of her films in 1974 Shama, directed by Nazar Shabab and co-starring Waheed Murad, Deeba, Mohammad Ali and Nadeem, was a golden jubilee.

Despite her work in films, Sharif had to look for more opportunities in movies, which did not came immediately. In 1975, she appeared as supporting actress, in director Masood Pervez's film Mera Naa Paatay Khan. Neelo and Shahid played the lead roles. Her efforts took on a new intensity and she proved her worth in the Pakistani cinema. She worked in director Iqbal Kashmiri's film Sharif Badmash. Ali Sufiyan Afaqi's film Ajnabi, Nazar Shabab's film Naukar.

An undeterred Sharif, dressed to perform, played the lead role opposite Ghulam Mohiuddin in director Wazeer Ali's film Masoom. Her most memorable role came in the super hit 1975 film Mera Naam Hai Mohabbat, directed by Shabab Kiranvi and earned her Special Award from Nigar Awards. Her next five releases in 1976 were Pervez Malik's film Talaash, Shabab Kiranvi's Dewar, Ali Sufyan Aafaqi's Aag aur Aansoo, Aslam Daar's Zubeida and one of her most successful films Shabana, directed by Zafar Shabab. The film successfully completed the golden jubilee, by winning performances turned in by Sharif, Waheed Murad and Shahid. Sharif also won Best Actress award from Nigar Awards.

Sharif continued her success with Zafar Shabab's Waqt (1976 film) in which she co-starred with Waheed Murad, Kavita and Shamim Ara.

=== 1980s ===
In 1980, she appeared in Iqbal Akhtar's film Chotay Nawab. She again collaborated with Akhtar in the 1981 film Dil nay phir yaad kya with Shahid and Waheed Murad. Her first release of 1982, was Sangdil; her performance was appreciated and she also won her second Nigar Awards for best actress in this film. From 1980 to 1990, Sharif worked in a number of films. Some of them were successful, some were not but her overall career remained successful in that decade. Some of her notable films of the decade are Deewanay Do, Chakkar, Khwahish, Deikha Jaaye Ga, Jawani Deewani, Mausum Hai Aashiqana, Aladin, Maa Bani Dulhan, Kaali, Insaan, Do Dil, Qudrat Da Intiqaam, Hero (1985 film), Miss Colombo (1984) and Miss Bangkok (1986).

For her performances in the last two films, she won two Best Actress award by Nigar Awards.

By the late 1980s, Sharif took more challenging roles and won critical praise for her performances in movies Aik Chehra Do Roop, Mehak, Saathi, Baaghi Haseena, Ishq Da Roag, Baarish, Duniya, Kundan (1987), Miss Bangkok (1986), Mukhra (1988) and Gori Deyaan Jhanjharan (1990). For her performances in last three films, she won three Best Actress award by Nigar Awards. In 1989, Sharif also worked in Pakistan's first sci-fi film Shaani directed by Saeed Rizvi but the film was a commercial and critical failure.

=== 1990s – Career setback, success regained and retirement ===
By the 1990s, Sharif's films were failing to do well at the box office. By the mid-1990s, she appeared only in a few films. During that time, she took a break and later started shooting for director Sangeeta's film Samaaj. She had to give up her character in Samaaj. But her next release in 1995 film Ham nahin ya tum nahin was a box-office success, which she followed with Piyasa Sawan and Dostana. In 1996 her film Sajawal released which was also a success. But after regaining success, Sharif did not sign more films. Sharif's last film was Ghayal, in which she worked opposite Izhar Qazi. The film was directed by Hasnain and released in 1997.

Sharif said about her decision to quit acting that:

"I am self analytical. It is important to keep your feet on the ground in a profession where you are idolized to such an extent that each wish becomes a command for others. But I had always wanted to quit films at the peak of my career. I had prepared myself mentally for that moment. One of the reasons why I am at peace with myself is that I never socialized or made friends with the showbiz lot. Examples of actors like Waheed Murad made a deep impression on me. I never wanted to touch the peak of stardom only to drop low in life. No, life is more than lights, adulation and being beautiful,"

In 2005, she appeared in a Lux 50 years celebration commercial.

She temporarily resumed her career as a model and currently owns a jewellery shop in Karachi.

== Personal life ==
Babra's sister Fakhra Sharif was also an actress. Babra Sharif married actor Shahid in 1977 Their marriage ended in divorce in 1978.

== Awards and accolades ==
She received the Nigar Awards eight times in her movie career.

- Special Award from Nigar Awards for her work in the film Mera Naam Hai Mohabbat in 1975.
- Nigar Award for best actress in the film Shabana in 1976. (Urdu)
- Nigar Award for best actress in the film Sangdil in 1982. (Urdu)
- Nigar Award for best actress in the film Miss Colombo in 1984. (Urdu)
- Nigar Award for best actress in the film Miss Bangkok in 1986. (Urdu)
- Nigar Award for best actress in the film Kundan in 1987. (Urdu)
- Nigar Award for best actress in the film Mukhra in 1988. (Punjabi)
- Nigar Award for best actress in the film Gori diyyaan jhanjharan in 1990. (Punjabi)

In 2003, Sharif won LUX Icon of Beauty Award for 2002 by Lux Style Awards held in Karachi.

In 2019, she was honoured by the Government of Pakistan with the Sitara-e-Imtiaz (Star of Excellence) award for her contributions towards the film and television industry.

In 2023, she received PTV National Icon Award at PTV's (PTV Icon Awards).

== See also ==
- List of Pakistani actresses
