= Neeli =

Former Pakistani film actress

- نیلی
- Born: Neelofar Begum; 24 June 1966 (age 60); Hyderabad, Pakistan
- Education: St. Mary's College (F.A)
- Occupations: Actress; Model; Dancer
- Years active: 1986 – 2006
- Children: 2
- Awards: 7 Nigar Awards

Neeli (Urdu: نیلی, born Neelofar) is a former Pakistani film actress who acted in Urdu, Pashto, Sindhi and Punjabi language films.

== Early life ==
Neelofar was born on 24 June 1966 in Hyderabad, Pakistan.

== Career ==
The director/producer Yunus Malik, a family friend, offered Neeli a role in a Punjabi film Akhri Jang. Sangeeta signed her for a role in the Urdu film Kasam Munne Kee. After that film, Sajjad Gul signed her up in his films Choron Ki Barat and Haseena 420. She starred in Madame Bavary in 1988 and had a double role in Kalay Chor. Later, she was paired with Javed Sheikh, and together they starred in Sher Ali (1992), Khuda Gawah (1993), Mushkil (1995), Jeeva (1995), and Chief Saab (1996). Neeli's pairing with Javed Sheikh was popular in films and then she worked in a PTV drama Yeh Jahan in 1994 under the name "Khoobsurat Jahan", which was shot on location in Scotland and London. Mushkil, dealing with the subject of child labour, was Sheikh's debut as director. After the decline of the Pakistani film industry in the early 2000s, Neeli gradually left the business in 2006.

== Personal life ==
She married a businessman and has two children with him. She along with her family moved and settled in Dubai. She was close friends with actors Jawed Sheikh, Nadeem and Sangeeta.

== Filmography ==
=== Television series ===
| Year | Title | Role | Network |
|---|---|---|---|
| 1994 | Yeh Jahan | Ambreen | PTV |

=== Film ===
| Year | Film | Role |
|---|---|---|
| 2006 | Dulhan Banti Hain Naseeboan Waliaan | |
| 2006 | Kudyoon Ko Daley | |
| 2000 | Ham Khilari Pyar Ke | |
| 2000 | Meri Tauba | |
| 1999 | Darindgi | |
| 1999 | Ishq Zinda Rahe Ga | |
| 1998 | Very Good Duniya Very Bad Laug | |
| 1998 | Insaf Ho To Aisa | |
| 1998 | Khalnaik | |
| 1998 | Harjai | |
| 1998 | Hathiara | |
| 1998 | Dushman Da Kharak | |
| 1997 | Mard Jeene Nahin Dete | |
| 1997 | Karam Data | |
| 1997 | Fareb | |
| 1997 | Dil Tera Aashiq | |
| 1996 | Chief Sahib | |
| 1996 | Dana | |
| 1996 | Sakhi Badshah | |
| 1996 | Chief Sahab | |
| 1996 | Kurdion Ko Daley Dana | |
| 1996 | Aao Pyar Karen | |
| 1995 | Jeeva | |
| 1995 | Mushkil | |
| 1995 | Jo Darr Gya Woh Marr Gya | |
| 1995 | Ham Nahin Ya Tum Nahin | |
| 1994 | Nehla Dehla | |
| 1994 | Pajero Group | |
| 1994 | Aakhri Mujra | |
| 1994 | Ziddi Gujjar | |
| 1993 | Khuda Ghawah | |
| 1993 | Aan | |
| 1993 | Zamana | |
| 1993 | Anhoni | |
| 1993 | Farishta | |
| 1993 | Wardi | |
| 1993 | Yaadgar | |
| 1993 | Be Taj Badshah | |
| 1993 | Sheeda Talli | |
| 1993 | Katwal | |
| 1993 | Nadir Shah | |
| 1993 | Nuri Bahadur | |
| 1992 | Sher Ali | |
| 1992 | Abida | |
| 1992 | Parinday | |
| 1992 | Dosti | |
| 1992 | Daku Raj | |
| 1992 | Sher Jang | |
| 1992 | Pamela | |
| 1992 | Abdullah the Great | |
| 1992 | Mohabbat Ke Saudagar | |
| 1992 | Dehshat Gard | |
| 1992 | Lashkar | |
| 1991 | Piar Aur Paisa | |
| 1991 | Darya Khan | |
| 1991 | Bakhtawar | |
| 1991 | Khatron Ke Khilari | |
| 1991 | Teen Yakke Teen Chhakke | |
| 1991 | Dolat Ke Pujari | |
| 1991 | Saat Khoon Muaf | |
| 1991 | Da Jurmunu Badshah | |
| 1991 | Kalay Chor | |
| 1990 | Chann Badmuash | |
| 1990 | Aakhri Takra | |
| 1990 | Choran Di Rani | |
| 1990 | Marshal | |
| 1990 | Jailor | |
| 1990 | Jangju Goreelay | |
| 1990 | International Guerillas | |
| 1990 | Insaniyat Kay Dushman | |
| 1989 | Yamla Jatt | |
| 1989 | Ameer Khan | |
| 1989 | Allah Khair | |
| 1989 | Toofani Bijlian | |
| 1989 | Jang Hi Jang | |
| 1989 | Madam Bawari | |
| 1989 | Karmu Dada | |
| 1989 | Rangeelay Jasoos | |
| 1989 | Mera Challenge | |
| 1989 | Sheran Di Maa | |
| 1989 | Roop ki Rani | |
| 1989 | Sarfarosh | |
| 1989 | Jan Nisar | |
| 1989 | Jaal | |
| 1988 | Allah Dad | |
| 1988 | Maasoom Gawah | |
| 1988 | Jang | |
| 1988 | Dilawar Khan | |
| 1988 | Qatil | |
| 1988 | Hesab Ketab | |
| 1988 | Haseena 420 | |
| 1988 | Tohfa | |
| 1988 | Maula Baksh | |
| 1987 | Choron Ki Barat | |
| 1987 | Bazi | |
| 1987 | Lava | |
| 1987 | Bhoot Bangla | |
| 1987 | Lady Reporter | |
| 1986 | Aakhri Jung | |

== Awards and recognition ==
Neeli won 7 Nigar Awards and 2 National Awards.

=== Nigar Awards ===
| Year | Award | Category | Result | Film | Ref. |
|---|---|---|---|---|---|
| 1987 | Nigar Awards | Best Supporting Actress | Won | Qasam Munney Ki | |
| 1989 | Nigar Awards | Best Actress | Won | Madam Bawari | |
| 1991 | Nigar Awards | Best Actress | Won | Bakhtawar | |
| 1993 | Nigar Awards | Best Actress | Won | Zamana | |
| 1994 | Nigar Awards | Best Actress | Won | Aakhri Mujra | |
| 1996 | Nigar Awards | Best Supporting Actress | Won | Sakahi Badshah | |
| 1997 | Nigar Awards | Best Actress | Won | Mard Jeenay Nahi Dete | |

=== National Awards ===
| Year | Award | Category | Result | Film | Ref. |
|---|---|---|---|---|---|
| 1988 | National Awards | Best Actress | Won | Haseena 420 | |
| 1991 | National Awards | Best Actress | Won | Bakhtawar | |

== See also ==
- List of Lollywood actors
