= Ghulam Mohiuddin (actor) =

Pakistani actor (born 1950)

- غلام محی الدین
- Born: 27 October 1950 (age 75); Hyderabad, India
- Other name: Gullo Bhai
- Occupation: Actor
- Years active: 1974–present
- Children: Ali Mohiuddin (son); Ayesha Kashif (daughter); Mariam Mohiuddin (daughter)
- Awards: Pride of Performance award by the President of Pakistan (2020); Won 7 Nigar Awards during his career

Ghulam Mohiuddin (Punjabi, Urdu: غلام محی الدین; also spelled Ghulam Mohi-Ud-Din) (born 27 October 1950) is a Pakistani actor of Urdu and Punjabi films.

One of the country's most popular film actors from the 1970s to the 1990s, he has worked in over 400 Urdu and Punjabi movies during a career spanning nearly 50 years.

He is popularly known as Gullo Bhai in the Pakistan film industry.

== Early life and family ==
Mohiuddin was born in Hyderabad, India in 1950; his family moved to Nazimabad, Karachi in 1958. He belongs to a Muhajir family of policemen with roots in Hyderabad Deccan and Bombay. One of five brothers and three sisters, he later shifted for his film work to Lahore, Punjab, where he has been living ever since.

His son Ali Mohiuddin is also an actor, having made his film debut in 2016 with Sawal 700 Crore Dollar Ka. Ghulam had produced the movie.

== Career ==
=== Cinema ===
After graduation, Mohiuddin began acting with radio and television plays. In 1974, he began his career in the film industry with the movie Dil Walay. The following year, he starred in Mera Naam Hai Mohabbat, which became a blockbuster hit in both Pakistan and China. This film was inspired by a Chinese folk story and marked Babra Sharif's debut as a lead actress.

He worked in all film genres, including action, where he was known for performing his own stunts. He was also noted for embracing experimental roles: in Pakistan's own adaptations of Sergio Leone's spaghetti westerns he played the "Man with No Name" type characters in movies such as Aansoo Aur Sholay (1976), followed by Aatish (1980) and Aandhi Aur Toofan (1984). He also starred in sci-fi movies and in Punjabi movies, while he could play the hero, the anti-hero as well the villain.

=== Television ===
Beginning in the 2000s, as a result of the decline of Pakistan's cinema, Mohiuddin ventured into television series.

== Legacy ==
Ghulam Mohiuddin is widely regarded as one of the defining stars of Pakistan's cinema golden era, particularly from the 1970s through the 1990s. Over a career spanning nearly five decades and more than 400 films, he became known for his screen presence, remembered for his tall stature and distinctive deep voice, his performances in both Urdu and Punjabi cinema, and enduring popularity across generations.

He has been the recipient of numerous accolades, including multiple Nigar Awards, Lux Style Awards and the prestigious Pride of Performance award, which was presented to him by the President of Pakistan in 2020.

== Selected filmography ==
=== Films ===
Year	Title	Role	References
1974	Dil Walay		
1975	Mera Naam Hai Mohabbat		
1975	Shararat	Asif	
1976	Society Girl	Asif	
1977	Ishq Ishq		
1978	Awaz		
1980	Aag Aur Sholay		
1981	Amanat		
1984	Doorian		
1987	Gernail Singh	Ghulam Mohammad	
1988	Maula Baksh		
1988	Aag Hi Aag		
1988	Haseena 420		
1989	Taqat Ka Toofan		
1989	Maula Sain		
1990	Hoshiar		
1990	Sholay-E-Sholay		
1990	Miss Cleopatra		
1990	International Guerillas		
1991	Zid		
1991	Sar Kata Insan		
1991	Kalay Chor	Sher Jang	
1991	Cobra	Inspector Arshad	
1991	Aalmi Jasoos		
1992	Daku Raaj		
1992	Majhoo		
1992	Hasinon Ki Barat		
1994	Pajero Group	Babar	
1994	Khandan		
1994	International Luteray		
1994	Buth Shikan		
1994	Saranga	Mansoor	
1994	Sarkata Insaan		
1995	Mushkil		
1995	Madam Rani	Aducet	
1995	Jungle Ka Qanoon		
1995	Jeeva		
1997	Qarz		
1997	Umar Mukhtar		
2011	Son of Pakistan		
2011	Khamosh Raho		
2013	Chambaili		
2016	Sawal 700 Crore Dollar Ka	Ringo	
2018	The Donkey King	Badshah Khan	

=== Television series ===
Year	Title	Role	Network
2006	Dobara	Jalal	PTV
2007	Mithaas	Dilawar	PTV
2012	Koi Meray Dil Say Pouchay	Sameer's father	PTV
2015	Dilfareb	Zain's father	Geo TV
2015	Maikey Ko Dedo Sandes	Maryam's father	Geo Entertainment
2016	Izn-e-Rukhsat	Sundus's father	Geo TV
2017	Khudgarz	Hassan's father	ARY Digital
2018	Sodai	Fariya's father	Express Entertainment

=== Telefilm ===
Year	Title	Role
2012	Mano	Mano's father-in-law

== Awards and recognition ==
Year	Award	Category	Result	Title	Ref.
1975	Nigar Award	Special Award	Won	Mera Naam Hai Mohabbat	
1978	Nigar Award	Special Award	Won	Mutthi Bhar Chawal	
1984	Nigar Award	Best Supporting Actor	Won	Lazawal	
1991	Nigar Award	Best Supporting Actor	Won	Zid	
1994	Nigar Award	Best Actor	Won	Sarkata Insaan	
1997	Nigar Award	Best Supporting Actor	Won	Karz	
2002	Nigar Award	Lifetime Achievement Award	Won	Himself	
2020	Pride of Performance	Award by the President of Pakistan	Won	Himself	
2023	PTV Icon Awards	National Icon Award	Won	Himself	

== See also ==
- List of Lollywood actors
