= List of Pakistani films of 1984 =

A list of films produced in Pakistan in 1984 (see 1984 in film) and in the Urdu language:

== 1984 (Jan-Dec) ==
Title	language	Director	Cast	Notes
Yeh Kaisay Hua	Urdu	Iqbal Rizvi	Kaveeta, Nadeem, Badar Munir, Firdaus Jamal, Nemat Sarhadi	Box Office: Average
Jagga Tay Shera	Punjabi	Imtiaz Quresh	Sultan Rahi, Anjuman, Iqbal Hassan, Naghma	
Khush Naseeb	Pashto	Syed Ansakh Saeedi	Musarrat Shaheen, Badar Munir, Tariq Shah, Liaqat Major, Shehnaz, Umar Daraz Khalil, Nemat Sarhadi	Box Office: Average
Shanakhti Card	Punjabi	S. Jamsheri	Aasia, Sultan Rahi, Iqbal Hassan, Saiqa, Adeeb, Afzaal Ahmad, Shahnawaz Ghumman, Imrozia, Asha Poslay, Meena Daud, Achhi Khan, Tanzeem Hassan	
Zaman Paigaam	Punjabi	Aziz Tabassum	Babra Sharif, Ghulam Mohayuddin, Mohammad Ali	Box Office: Flop
Namak Halal	Punjabi	Rangeela	Mumtaz, Ali Ejaz, Nanha, Khanum, Rangeela, Firdaus Jamal, Adeeb, Bahar, Zamurrad, Irfan Khoost, Jameel Fakhri, Altaf Khan, Sajjad Kishwar	
Hathan Vich Hath	Punjabi	Iqbal Kashmiri	Mumtaz, Sultan Rahi, Mustafa Qureshi, Iqbal Hassan	
Aisa Bhi Hota Hay	Urdu	Masroor Anwar	Shabnam, Shafi Mohammad, Arifa Siddiqi, Tamanna, Lehri	Box Office: Hit
Shikari	Urdu	Mumtaz Ali Khan	Jameel Babar, Arzoo, Musarrat Shaheen, Bedar Bakht, Rangeela, Zahir Shah, Jahangir Mughal	Box Office: Average
Mela Tay Medan	Punjabi	Imtiaz Quresh	Anjuman, Yousuf Khan, Mustafa Qureshi, Aliya, Afzaal Ahmad, Rangeela, Bahar, Talish, Allauddin, Sawan, Asif Khan, Fazil Butt, Qasim Khan, Raj Multani, Jahangir Mughal، Khawar Abbas	Box Office: Average
Dada Ustad	Punjabi	Hasnain	Sultan Rahi, Rani, Ali Ejaz, Nanha, Nazli, Iqbal Hassan, Rangeela, Adeeb, Zamurrad, Saiqa, Parveen Boby, Khalid Saleem Mota, Altaf Khan, Nasrullah Butt	
Ishq Samundar	Punjabi	Altaf Hussain	Mumtaz, Ali Ejaz, Nanha, Nazli, Rangeela, Sheikh Iqbal	
Amal Dulare Mall	Pashto	Murad Shanwari	Yasmin Khan, Badar Munir, Umar Daraz	
Kaka Ji	Punjabi	Rangeela	Khanum, Ali Ejaz, Nanha, Nazli, Bahar, Rangeela	
Muqaddar Ka Sikandar	Urdu	Iqbal Kashmiri	Mumtaz, Mohammad Ali, Sultan Rahi, Bindia, Ali Ejaz, Munawar Saeed, Rehan, Firdaus Jamal, Tamanna, Seema,	Box Office: Average
Iman Tay Farangi	Punjabi	Khalifa Saeed Ahmad	Mumtaz, Sultan Rahi, Nazli, Akbar, Iqbal Hassan, Shahid, Badar Munir, Nanha, Khalifa Nazir, Sawan	Box Office: Average
Shadi Magar Aadhi	Urdu	Zafar Shabab	Shabnam, Javed Sheikh, Bindiya, Aurangzeb	Box Office: Hit
Haibat Khan	Punjabi	Syed Zahoor Hussain Gilani	Mohammad Ali, Sultan Rahi, Mumtaz, Badar Munir, Durdana Rehman, Adeeb, Naghma, Majeed Zarif, Seema, Jaggi Malik, Changezi, Iqbal Durrani, Nasrullah Butt, Nazia Hafeez, Tariq Javed, Abid Kashmiri	Box Office: Average
Kalia	Punjabi	Waheed Dar	Mumtaz, Sultan Rahi, Mustafa Qureshi, Nazli, Iqbal Hassan	Box Office: Superhit
Doorian	Urdu	Hassan Askari	Shabnam, Faisal, Mohammad Ali, Arzoo, Talish, Hanif, Ibrahim Nafees, Akhtar Shad	Box Office: Hit
Fifty Fifty	Punjabi	Arif Chodhary	Musarrat Shaheen, Ali Ejaz, Nanha, Durdana Rehman, Aslam Parvez, Ilyas Kashmiri, Bahar, Majeed Zarif, Khalid Saleem Mota	
Ilaqa Exchange	Punjabi	Sikkedar	Aasia, Yousuf Khan, Afzal Khan, Shehla Gil, Adeeb, Zahir Shah, Jahangir Mughal, Aliya, Musarrat Shaheen, Sawan, Jaggi Malik, Iqbal Durrani	
Ishq Pecha	Punjabi	Anwar Iqbal	Rani, Ali Ejaz, Nanha, Mumtaz, Nazli	
Bala Gaadi	Punjabi	Azmat Nawaz	Mumtaz, Iqbal Hassan, Kaifee, Chakori, Afzaal Ahmad, Inayat Hussain Bhatti, Bahar, Adeeb, Naghma, Saiqa, Ajmal Khan, Seema, Zahir Shah, Iqbal Durrani, Jaggi Malik	Box Office: Average
Naam Mera Badnam	Urdu	Sangeeta	Shabnam, Mohammad Ali, Sangeeta, Kaveeta, Ayaz, Aurangzeb Laghari, Abid Kashmiri, Saqi	Box Office: Hit
Lal Toofan	Punjabi	M. Akram	Sultan Rahi, Anjuman, Mustafa Qureshi, Khanum, Adeeb, Bahar, Zubair, Rangeela, Jaggi Malik, Mehboob Alam, Changezi, Ladla, Imdad Hussain, Zahir Shah, Niazi, Nazia Hafeez, Altaf Khan, Khawar Abbas, Mustafa Tind, Jabroo	Box Office: Average
Sholay	Punjabi	Younis Malik	Sultan Rahi, Anjuman, Mustafa Qureshi, Ejaz, Bahar, Afzaal Ahmad, Ilyas Kashmiri, Nanha, Khalifa Nazir, Abid Kashmiri, Imdad Hussain, Altaf Khan, Iqbal Durrani, Zahir Shah, Anwar Khan, Jaggi Malik, Changezi, Sawan	
Commandar	Punjabi	S.A. Bukhari	Sultan Rahi, Anjuman, Mustafa Qureshi, Iqbal Hassan, Habib, Bahar, Bazghar, Nazli, Rangeela, Ajmal, Mustafa Tind, Imdad Hussain, Taya Barkat, Iqbal Durrani, Khawar Abbas, Raj Multani	Box Office: Average
Jagga Tay Reshma	Punjabi	Younis Malik	Rani, Sultan Rahi, Mustafa Qureshi, Iqbal Hassan, Naghma, Bahar, Ilyas Kashmiri, Talish, Adeeb, Mizla, Rangeela, Ladla, Jaggi Malik, Altaf Khan, Nasrullah Butt, Iqbal Durrani, Saleem Hassan, Khawar Abbas	
Basera	Urdu	Ehtesham, Sharif Amini	Shabana, Nadeem, Mustafa, Rangeela, Shoukat, Master Adnan, Bobby Maya Chaudhry	Box Office: Hit
Kamyabi	Urdu	Pervez Malik	Nadeem Baig, Shabnam, Talat Hussain, Nanha	Box Office: Hit
Khog Dushman	Punjabi	Aziz Tabassum	Yasmin Khan, Badar Munir, Bedar Bakht, Shehnaz, Tariq Shah, Parveen Bobby, Kaleem, Rasheed Khan	Box Office: Average
Miss Colombo	Urdu	Shamim Ara	Babra Sharif, Faisal, Javed Sheikh, Sabeeta, Aslam Parvez, Rangeela, Nayyar Sultana, Qavi, Irfan Khoost	Box Office: Hit
Nave Bond	Pashto	Darwesh	Yasmin Khan, Badar Munir, Mussarat Shaheen	Box Office: Average
Phul Machhi	Sindhi	Noor-Ul-Islam	Shehla, Babar Sultan, Raju, Roshan	
Taqat	Punjabi	Kaifee	Sultan Rahi, Anjuman, Kaifee, Chakori, Iqbal Hassan, Afzaal Ahmad, Bahar, Mustafa Qureshi, Nanna, Irfan Khoost, Munir Zarif, Munawar Saeed, Sawan, Iqbal Durrani, Zahir Shah, Jaggi Malik, Seema	
Ukhly Nave	Pashto	Saeed Ali Khan	Musarrat Shaheen, Badar Munir, Asif Khan	Box Office: Hit
Yaar Badshah	Pashto	Saeed Anaskh Saeedi	Sangeeta, Jameel Babar, Tariq Shah, Liaqat Major	
Teri Meri Ek Marzi	Punjabi	Nazar Shabab	Durdana Rehman, Ali Ejaz, Nanha, Nazli, Rangeela, Jameel Fakhri, Imrozia, Khalid Saleem Mota, Aurangzeb, Seema, Saqi, Chakram, Munawar Saeed, Albela, Murid Ahmad	
Baghi	Punjabi	Waheed Dar	Anjuman, Mustafa Qureshi, Mumtaz, Shujait, Rangeela	
Lewanai	Pashto	Iqbal Hussain	Yasmin Khan, Badar Munir, Nadra, Sardar Ali, Liaqat Major, Bedar Bakht, Umar Daraz, Nemat Sarhadi	
Barood	Urdu	Raye Farooq	Shabnam, Mohammad Ali, Sultan Rahi, Lubna Khattak, Babar, Qavi, Nanha, Tariq Shah, Shahida Mini, Seema	Box Office: Average
Ucha Shamla Jatt Da	Punjabi	Aslam Irani	Rani, Sultan Rahi, Mustafa Qureshi, Bazgha, Iqbal Hassan, Ilyas Kashmiri, Afzaal Ahmad, Bahar, Firdous, Seema, Adeeb, Changezi, Talish, Jaggi Malik, Zahir Shah	
Chor Chowkidar	Punjabi	Altaf Hussain	Rani, Ali Ejaz, Nanha, Nazli, Khalifa Nazir, Qavi, Talish, Shehla Gill, Anwar Khan, Tamanna, Farah Deeba, Altaf Khan, Haidar Abbas	
Andher Nagri	Punjabi	Mushtaq Babar	Mumtaz, Ali Ejaz, Nanha, Firdous, Talish, Adeeb, Fida Malik, Aliya, Nazli, Sheikh Iqbal, Imdad Hussain, Banka	
Khanu Dada	Punjabi	Altaf Hussain	Mumtaz, Ali Ejaz, Nanha, Nazli, Iqbal Hassan, Rangeela, Tanzeem Hassan, Aslam Parvez, Imrozia, Jaggi Malik, Altaf Khan, Khawar Abbas	
Aandhi Aur Toofan	Urdu	S.A Hafiz	Shabnam, Ghulam Mohiuddin, Mohammad Ali, Habib, Mustafa Qureshi, Humayun Qureshi, Nanha, Rangeela, Adeeb	Box Office: Average
Baz Shehbaz	Punjabi	Altaf Hussain	Sultan Rahi, Anjuman, Mustafa Qureshi, Naghma, Iqbal Hassan	Box Office: Average
Bobby	Urdu	Nazar Shabab	Sabeeta, Javed Sheikh, Mohammad Ali, Rangeela, Sikandar Shaheen, Benjamin Sisters	Box Office: Super-Hit
Droghrona	Pashto	Mumtaz Ali Khan	Musarrat Shaheen, Badar Munir, Nemat Sarhadi	
Dulla Bhatti	Punjabi	M. Akram	Anjuman, Yousuf Khan, Mustafa Qureshi, Sabiha Khanum, Nanha, Nazli, Rangeela, Albela, Khalid Saleem Mota, Roomana, Talish, Aslam Parvez, Adeeb, Sawan	Box Office: Average
Kalyar	Punjabi	Deen	Anjuman, Ejaz, Iqbal Hassan, Zamarrud, Ilyas Kashmiri, Rangeela, Bahar, Mustafa Qureshi, Zahir Shah, Sajjad Kishwar, Saqi	Box Office: Average
Taavan	Punjabi	Basheer Rana	Mumtaz, Sultan Rahi, Mustafa Qureshi, Shahida Mini, Iqbal Hassan	
Khubsoorat Dulhan	Urdu	Syed Ali Khan	Musarrat Shaheen, Badar Munir, Asif Khan, Sawera, Liaqat Major	
Sajawal Daku	Punjabi	Agha Hussaini	Rani, Sultan Rahi, Mustafa Qureshi, Shagufta, Nanha, Humayun Qureshi, Jaggi Malik, Iqbal Durrani	
Suhe Meenh	Pashto	Manzoor Ahmad	Nimmi, Badar Munir, Nemat Sarhadi, Liaqat Major	
Aaj Ka Insan	Urdu	Gulzar Ahmad	Rani, Shahid, Ghulam Mohiuddin, Asif Khan, Ruhi Bano, Aslam Parvez	Box Office: Unknown
Amail	Pashto	Inayat Ullah Khan	Yasmin Khan, Badar Munir, Bedar Bakht, Meena Gul, Aman, Umar Daraz Khalil, Nemat Sarhadi	
Naseebon Wali	Urdu	Shamas Chodhary	Shabnam, Shafi Mohammad, Mohammad Ali, Waseem Abbas, Shahida Mini	Box Office: Average
Taqat	Pashto	Ansakh Saeedi	Musarrat Shaheen, Badar Munir, Nemat Sarhadi	
Judai	Punjabi	Younis Rathore	Rani, Ali Ejaz, Nanha, Sangeeta, Nazli, Syed Noor, Aslam Parvez, Tamanna, Asim Bukhari	
Pardesi Ain Pyar	Sindhi	Mushtaq Changezi	Reeta, Musthaq Changezi, Anjuman, Nasreen, Roshan	
Raja Rani	Punjabi	Rangeela	Rani, Ali Ejaz, Nanha, Sangeeta, Rangeela	Box Office: Average
Khush Naseeb	Urdu	A.H Saddiqi	Kaveeta, Nadeem, Qavi, Behroz Sabazwari, Nayyar Sultana	Box Office: Average
Mamta	Sindhi	Yousuf Nasar	Reeta, Mustaq Changezi, Nayyar Sultana, Munawar Saeed	Box Office: Hit
Pukar	Punjabi	Aizaz Syed	Mumtaz, Sultan Rahi, Mustafa Qureshi, Sangeeta, Zamurrad, Nimmo, Adeeb, Bahar, Jaggi Malik, Saleem Hassan	
Ishq Nachavay Gali Gali	Punjabi	Aslam Dar	Durdana Rehman, Ayaz, Shahida Minni, Rangeela, Sabiha Khanum, Talish, Zahoor Ali, Master Khurram, Taya Barkat, Afzaal Ahmad, Nasrullah Butt	Box Office: SuperHit
Chann Cheeta	Punjabi	Masood Asghar	Sultan Rahi, Anjuman, Mustafa Qureshi, Iqbal Hassan, Nazli, Gori, Bahar, Firdous, Sawan, Ilyas Kashmiri, Zahir Shah, Rangeela, Sheikh Iqbal, Taya Barkat	
Karaye Kay Goreelay	Urdu	Waheeda Khan	Laela, Javed Sheikh, Badar Munir, Abid Ali, Asif Khan, Ghulam Mohiuddin, Firdous, Nemat Sarhadi, Rangeela	Box Office: Average
Lazawal	Urdu	Muhammad Javed Fazil	Shabnam, Nadeem	Box Office: Hit
Qanoon	Pashto	Mumtaz Ali Khan	Musarrat Shaheen, Badar Munir, Musarrat Shaheen, Nemat Sarhadi	Box Office: Average
Dil Maa Da	Punjabi	Mohammad Saleem	Sultan Rahi, Sangeeta, Shehbaz Akmal, Sitara, Firdous, Mohammad Ali, Iqbal Hassan, Nazli, Afzal Khan, Shujaat Hashmi, Asad Bukhari, Sawan, Talish, Aslam Parvez, Ajmal, Sheikh Iqbal, Ilyas Kashmiri, Sikedar, Jaggi Malik, Mustafa Tind, Gotam, Zahir Shah, Adeeb, Seema, Talat Siddiqi, Asha Poslay	Box Office: Average
Laggan	Punjabi	Basheer Rana	Sultan Rahi, Anjuman, Mustafa Qureshi, Shahida Mini	Box Office: Average
Laraka	Punjabi	M. Aslam	Rani, Sultan Rahi, Mustafa Qureshi, Bazgha, Afzal	Box Office: Average
Aag Ka Samundar	Urdu	Iqbal Yousuf	Mohammad Ali, Rani, Shahid, Aslam Parvez, Adeeb, Saiqa, Nimmo, Seema, Saqi, Chakram, Sheikh Iqbal, Ilyas Anjum, Shahnawaz Ghumman, Khalid Saleem Mota, Parvez Raza	Box Office: Average
Changhala	Pashto	Toufiq Shan	Musarrat Shaheen, Badar Munir, Nemat Sarhadi	
Jatt Kemala Gaya Dubai	Punjabi	Syed Kamal	Syed Kamal, Nadia Hassan, Naila Jabeen, Firdaus Jamal, Aslam Parvez, Sawan, Faizi, Ladla, Hamid Rana	
Teray Ghar Kay Samnay	Urdu	Zafar Shabab	Shabnam, Javed Sheikh, Rangeela, Lehri, Surayya Khan, Ismat Tahira, Abid Kashmiri, Tamanna, Behroz Sabazwari, Jeevan Sultan, Meena Daud, Jawad Waseem	Box Office: Average
Jamrood Khan	Pashto	Aziz Khan	Musarrat Shaheen, Badar Munir, Nemat Sarhadi	
Reshmi Rumal	Punjabi	Jameel Akhtar	Suzi Saleha, Shahid, Habib, Durdana Rehman, Masood Akhtar, Ali Asad, Farath Raza, Sawan, Iqbal Durrani, Jaggi Malik, Taya Barkat, Raj Multani, Saqi, Fomi	Box Office: Flop

== See also ==
- 1984 in Pakistan
