= List of Pakistani films of 1980 =

This is a list of films produced in Pakistan during 1980 (see 1980 in film) which use the Urdu language:

== Urdu ==
Title	Release	Director	Cast	Notes
Bandish	11 January	Nazrul Islam	Shabnam, Nadeem, Diana Christana, Roy Martin	Box Office: Super Hit
Aap Ki Khatir	1 February	Zeenat	Rani, Shahid, Rahat Kazmi, Rangeela, Aslam Parvez	
Farzana	8 February	Shams Chodhary	Kaveeta, Shahid, Najma, Ghulam Mohayuddin	
Ham Dono	15 February	Parvez Malik	Shabnam, Nadeem, Syed Kemal, Nimmi, Saiqa, Jameel Bismil	Box Office: Super Hit
Daaman	29 February	Shabab Keranvi	Babra Sharif, Asif Raza Mir, Ali Ejaz	
Zamir	7 March	Iqbal Akhtar	Deeba, Mohammad Ali, Waheed Murad, Roohi Bano	Box Office: Average
Chotay Nawab	14 March	Iqbal Akhtar	Babra Sharif, Shahid, Waheed Murad, Neelo, Bindia	Box Office: Average
Bandhan	21 March	Shaukat Hashmi	Neelam, Waheed Murad, Najma, Ghulam Mohayuddin	Box Office: Flop
Mahal Meray Sapno Ka	21 March	Sangeeta	Kaveeta, Nadeem, Sangeeta, Ghulam Mohayuddin	Box Office: Average
Khandan	28 March	Riaz Malik	Najma, Rahat Kazmi, Badar Munir, Tamanna	
Aatish	11 April	S. A. Hafiz	Najma, Ghulam Mohayuddin, Badar Munir	Box Office: Average
Hey Yeh Shohar	11 April	S. Suleman	Rani, Shahid, Asif Raza Mir, Shehla Gill	
Haseena Maan Jaye Gi	25 April	Nazrul Islam	Asiya, Rangeela, Lehri, Tamanna, Ragni	Box Office: Flop
Saima	2 May	Mohammad Javed Fazil	Babra Sharif, Nadeem, Rahat Kazmi, Bazgha	Box Office: Super Hit
Sathi	9 May	Nazar Shabab	Babra Sharif, Shahid, Asif Raza Mir, Bindia, Rangeela	Box Office: Average
Smuggler	16 May	Javed Sajjad	Ishrat Chaudhary, Badar Munir, Mustafa Qureshi	
Samjhota	2 June (unconfirmed)	Sagheer Ahmad	Musarrat Shaheen, Ghulam Mohayuddin, Roohi Bano	
Suraj Bhi Tamashai	2 June	M. Zia-ur-Rasheed	Rahat Kazmi, Khalid Nizami, Zenat Yasmin	
Aazmaish	6 June	Zafar Shabab	Shabnam, Shahid, Rahat Kazmi, Nanha	
Badaltay Mousam	13 August	Nazar Shabab	Shabnam, Nadeem, Shahid, Tahira Naqvi	Box Office: Average
Double Cross	13 August	M. Farooq	Asiya, Asif Khan, Mustafa Qureshi, Deeba	
Hanstay Aansoo	13 August	Munawar Rasheed	Nisho, Tariq, Allauddin, Saqi, Shabbo, Nazneen	
Rishta	5 September	Parvez Malik	Shabnam, Nadeem, Anjuman, Sabiha, Allauddin, Nayyar Sultana	Box Office: Hit
Badnam	3 October	Iqbal Yousuf	Mohammad Ali, Rani, Babra Sharif, Waheed Murad	Box Office: Hit
Mehndi Lagi Meray Haath	20 October	Sangeeta	Sangeeta, Nadeem, Kaveeta, Rangeela, Bahar	Box Office: Average
Nahin Abhi Nahin	7 November	Nazrul Islam	Shabnam, Faisal, Ayaz, Arzoo, Deeba, Qavi	Box Office: Super Hit
Pyari	12 December	Jamshed Naqvi	Shabnam, Waheed Murad, Ghulam Mohayuddin, Nisho, Qavi, Naghma, Humayun Qureshi	Box Office: Hit

== Punjabi ==
Title	Release	Director	Cast	Notes
Aakhri Nishan	1 February	S. A. Bukhari	Musarrat Shaheen, Afzaal Ahmad, Jameel Babar, Aslam Parvez, Bahar	Box Office: Average
Dushman Mera Yaar	8 February	Akhtar Saleem	Asiya, Sultan Rahi, Asif Khan, Khalid Saleem, Adeeb	Box Office: Average
Hirasat	8 February	Agha Hussaini	Sultan Rahi, Najma, Asif Khan, Chakori, Mustafa Qureshi, Adeeb, Bahar	
Shikanja	22 February	Khursheed Ullah	Sweety, Asif Khan, Mustafa Qureshi	Box Office: Average
Badmashi Band	29 February	Mulazim Hussain Bhatti	Chakori, Kaifee, Nazli, Altaf Khan, Romana	
Ik Wohti 3 Lahray	7 March	Rangeela	Mumtaz, Syed Kemal, Nanha, Rangeela, Khalid Saleem Mota	
Jeeru Badnaam	14 March	Altaf Ali	Chakori, Kaifee, Bahar, Ishrat Chaudhary, Rangeela	
2 Toofaan	2 May	Rehmat Ali	Asiya, Sudhir, Mustafa Qureshi, Nanha, Ilyas Kashmiri	
Wadda Thanedar	30 May	Nanha	Mumtaz, Nanha, Kaifee, Chakori, Ali Ejaz, Bahar, Jaggi Malik, Altaf Khan	
Yaar Dushman	6 June	Waheed Dar	Asiya, Yousuf Khan, Najma, Chakori, Mustafa Qureshi, Nanha	
Mann Mauji	13 June	Imtiaz Quresh	Asiya, Shahid, Nanha, Aslam Parvez, Mustafa Qureshi	
Ladla Puttar	4 July	Rasheed Akhtar	Asiya, Sangeeta, Rangeela, Waheeda Khan	
Behram Daku	13 August	Rauf Abbasi	Asiya, Sultan Rahi, Chakori, Adeeb, Ajmal, Talish, Raj Multani, Khayyam, Nasrullah Butt	Box Office: Super Hit
Lahu Day Rishtay	13 August	Raja Hafeez	Rani, Inayat Hussain Bhatti, Kaifee, Husna, Munawar Zarif	
Sardar	13 August	Iqbal Kashmiri	Yousuf Khan, Asiya, Iqbal Hassan, Anjuman, Talish, Sabiha, Zahir Shah, Adeeb, Rangeela	Box Office: Average
Barkat Majeethia	12 September	Hafeez Ahmad	Yousuf Khan, Musarrat Shaheen, Ishrat Chaudhry, Adeeb, Afzaal Ahmad, Sawan	
Mama Bhanja	3 October	Aslam Irani	Sudhir, Musarrat Shaheen, Afzaal Ahmad, Nazli, Mazhar Shah, Shahnawaz	
Sheikh Chilli	3 October	Daud Butt	Rani, Shahid, Aslam Khan, Chakori	
2 Nishan	20 October	Waheed Dar	Asiya, Mumtaz, Mustafa Qureshi, Yousuf Khan	
Jhagra	20 October	Akbar Khan	Asiya, Bahar, Mustafa Qureshi, Ilyas Kashmiri	
Raju Rangbaz	20 October	Daud Butt	Asiya, Sultan Rahi, Afzaal Ahmad, Najma	
Sohra Tay Jawani	5 December	Haidar Chodhary	Mumtaz, Ali Ejaz, Nanha, Tamanna, Durdana Rehman	Box Office: Super Hit
Heera Puttar	12 December	Hashim Khan	Neelo, Iqbal Hassan, Saiqa, Ali Ejaz, Aslam Parvez	

== Pashto ==
Title	Release	Director	Cast	Notes
Da Veenay Tagj	1 February	Ishtiaq Akbar	Sheren Khan, Mushtaq, Bakhat Nazer, Yaar Mohammad, Sher Khan	
Beltoon	2 May	Iqbal Hussain	Yasmin Khan, Badar Munir, Liaqat Major	Box Office: Average
Iqrar	2 May	Inayat Ullah Khan	Yasmin Khan, Badar Munir, Liaqat Major	Box Office: Average
Zakhmoona	30 May	Mumtaz Ali Khan	Najma, Asif Khan, Mussarat Shaheen, Badar Munir	Box Office: Average
Angaar	6 June	Inayat Ullah Khan	Yasmin Khan, Badar Munir, Bedar Bakhat, Khanum	
Baraan	6 June	Waheeda Khan	Yasmin Khan, Bedar Bakht, Humayun Qureshi, Nemat Sarhadi	Box Office: Average
Insaf	27 October	Aziz Tabassum	Yasmin Khan, Badar Munir, Bedar Bakht, Surayya Khan	Box Office: Average
Peghor	28 November	Mukhtar Khan	Yasmin Khan, Badar Munir, Naemat Sarhadi	Box Office: Average
Spen Stargay	12 December	Waheeda Khan	Musarrat Shaheen, Badar Munir, Bedar Bakht, Khushi Maheen, Ishrat Chaudhary, Liaqat Major	Box Office: Hit

== Others ==
Title	Release	Director	Cast	Notes
Qissa Khawani	20 October	Tanvir Qateel	Sultan Rahi, Yasmin Khan, Waheeda Khan, Rangeela	Language: Hindko. First and only film.

== See also ==
- 1980 in Pakistan
