= List of Pakistani films of 1985 =

A list of films produced in Pakistan in 1985:

== Lollywood films 1985 (Jan - Dec) ==
Lollywood	Director	Cast	Notes
Hero	Iqbal Yusuf	Waheed Murad, Mumtaz, Nadeem Baig, Aslam Pervaiz, Saqi, Babra Sharif	Box Office:
Benazir Qurbani	K. Khursheed	Shabnam, Javed Sheikh, Ayaz, Kokab Dar, Rangeela, Firdaus Jamal, Tamanna	Box Office: Unknown
Ham Say Hay Zamana	Mohammad Javed Fazil	Nadeem, Talat Hussain, Abid Kashmiri, Irfan Khoost, Rozeena, Mustafa, Menu Rehman, Shiva	Box Office: Hit
Mehak	Zafar Shabab	Babra Sharif, Faisal, Sabiha, Zamurrad, Mohammad Ali, Kheyyam Sarhadi, Tani	Box Office: Average
Halchal	Parvez Malik	Shabana, Javed Sheikh, Nazan Sanchi, Adeeb, Lehri, Talat Hussain, Behroz Sabzwari	Box Office: Hit
Ek Dulhan	Mumtaz Ali Khan	Rani, Badar Munir, Mohammad Ali, Nemat Sarhadi, Shahida Mini, Firdous, Iqbal Bukhari, Rangeela	Box Office: Average
Black Mail	Iqbal Kashmiri	Sultan Rahi, Nazli, Ghulam Mohiuddin, Shehnaz, Mustafa Qureshi, Qavi, Saqi, Zahir Shah	Box Office: Unknown
Parwana	Jahangir Qaisar	Babra Sharif, Nadeem, Asif Raza Mir, Zamurrad, Qavi, Bahar, Khalid Saleem Mota, Tamanna	Box Office: Average
Hong Kong Kay Sholay	Jan Mohammad	Babra Sharif, Javed Sheikh, Geeta Kumari, Vajeera, Rangeela, Adeeb, Mustafa Qureshi	Box Office: Hit
Mashriq Maghrib	Shuja Aqeel	Najma, Syed Kemal, Aurangzeb, Nimmi, Rozina, Khanum, Aslam Parvez, Khalid Saleem Mota, Parveen Boby, Meena Daud, Kemal Irani, Saqi, Afshan Qureshi, Seema	Box Office: Unknown
Miss Singapore	Shamim Ara	Babra Sharif, Faisal, Rangeela, Nanha, Afzaal Ahmad, Humayun Qureshi, Albela, Afshan Qureshi, Munawar Saeed, Khurram	Box Office: Hit
Jeenay Nahin Dun Gi	Sangeeta	Mohammad Ali, Sangeeta, Kaveeta, Javed Sheikh, Zamurrad, Afzaal Ahmad, Bahar, Rangeela, Kokab Dar, Saqi	Box Office: Hit
Deevanay 2	Nazrul Islam	Babra Sharif, Nadeem, Bindia, Talish, Sabiha	Box Office: Hit
Khoon Aur Pani	Younis Malik	Rani, Mohammad Ali, Babra Sharif, Ghulam Mohiuddin	Box Office: Hit
Palkon Ki Chhaon Mein	Nazrul Islam	Babra Sharif, Faisal, Ayaz, Jamil Fakhri, Nazir Hussaini, Zamurrad, Seema, Khalifa Nazir, Behroz Sabzwari, Sadiq Ali	Box Office: Hit
Nadia	Nazar Shabab	Sabeeta, Javed Sheikh, Seemab, Shahid, Humayun Qureshi	Box Office: Average
Naraz	Mohammad Javed Fazil	Shabnam, Nadeem, Faisal, Arifa Siddiqi, Tamanna, Samina Ahmad, Talish, Irfan Khoost, Abid Kashmiri, Abid Butt, Sajjad Kishwar, Talat Siddiqi, Afzaal Ahmad	Box Office: Average
Zamin Aasman	Nazrul Islam	Sabeeta, Nadeem, Shiva, Noutan, Sushma Shahi, Zamurrad, Anwar Hussain, Mustafa	Box Office: Hit
Direct Hawaldar	Irfan Khoost	Irfan Khoost, Sonia, Babar, Sitara, Qavi, Jameel Fakhri, Talish, Sultan Rahi, Fakhri Ahmad, Zubair, Ismat Tahira, Firdaus Jamal, Afshan Qureshi, Ghayyur Akhtar, Musarrat Shaheen, Tariq Shah, Asim Bukhari, Alia Begum, Abid Butt, Hamid Rana, Mohammad Ali, Jahangir Mughal	Box Office: Hit
Ham Aur Tum	Hassan Askari	Salma Agha, Javed Sheikh, Nanha, Afzal Ahmad, Nasir Chin, Abdul Hameed Bajwa, Surinder Kochal Durdial, Diptee	Box Office: Average

== Punjabi films 1985 (Jan-Dec) ==
Title	Director	Cast	Notes
Sahib Bahadur	Rangeela	Rani, Ali Ejaz, Nazli, Rangeela, Nanha	Box Office: Unknown
Thag Badshah	Naseem Haider	Rani, Ali Ejaz, Nazli, Nanha, Zamurrad, Rangeela, Iqbal Hassan	Box Office: Unknown
Sajjan Dushman	Hasnain	Sangeeta, Yousuf, Iqbal Hassan, Mustafa Qureshi, Firdous, Nazli	Box Office: Average
Nikah	Altaf Hussain	Anjuman, Ali Ejaz, Nanha, Rangeela, Talat Siddiqi, Ilyas Kashmiri, Gori, Hairat Angez, Majeed Zarif, Munir Zarif, Abid Kashmiri, Mustafa Tind, Haidar Abbas, Abbu Shah	Box Office: Unknown
Choorian	Altaf Hussain	Anjuman, Ali Ejaz, Nanha, Nazli, Zamurrad, Iqbal Hassan	
Badlay Di Agg	Haidar Chodhary	Anjuman, Yousuf Khan, Mustafa Qureshi, Iqbal Hassan, Naghma, Ilyas Kashmiri, Imrozia, Haidar Abbas, Anwar Khan	Box Office: Unknown
Dhee Rani	Altaf Hussain	Mumtaz, Ali Ejaz, Yousuf Khan, Anjuman, Nanha, Ilyas Kashmiri, Talish, Iqbal Hassan	Box Office: Superhit
Rishta Kagaz Da	Altaf Hussain	Anjuman, Ali Ejaz, Nanha, Rangeela, Shahida Mini, Humayun Qureshi	Box Office: Unknown
Babar Khan	Daud Butt	Rani, Yousuf Khan, Mustafa Qureshi, Sangeeta	Box Office: Average
Chandni	Iftikhar Khan	Rani, Ali Ejaz, Sangeeta, Nanha, Master Khurram, Rangeela, Firdous, Zamurrad	Box Office: Unknown
Chann Baloch	Parvez Rana	Rani, Sultan Rahi, Mustafa Qureshi, Firdous, Iqbal Hassan	Box Office: Average
Lakha Daku	Altaf Hussain	Sultan Rahi, Anjuman, Mustafa Qureshi, Iqbal Hassan, Nargis	Box Office: Unknown
Maa Puttar	Altaf Hussain	Sultan Rahi, Anjuman, Mustafa Qureshi, Iqbal Hassan, Naghma, Habib-ur-Rahman	Box Office: Unknown
Qismat	Iqbal Kashmiri	Anjuman, Yousuf Khan, Sultan Rahi, Sangeeta, Arifa Siddiqi, Nanha	
Haidar Khan	Younis Rathor	Khanum, Mustafa Qureshi, Iqbal Hassan, Habib-ur-Rahman, Nazli, Sawan	Box Office: Unknown
Angara	Mohammad Akram	Aasia, Yousuf Khan, Sultan Rahi, Sabiha, Allauddin	Box Office: Unknown
Ajab Khan	Waheed Dar	Anjuman, Yousuf Khan, Sultan Rahi, Babra, Afzal	Box Office: Super Hit
Chann Heera	Arshad Mirza	Anjuman, Ghulam Mohiuddin, Zamurrad, Iqbal Hassan, Firdous, Ilyas Kashmiri, Bahar	Box Office: Average
Sheesh Naag	Imtiaz Quresh	Rani, Sultan Rahi, Mustafa Qureshi, Zamurrad, Afzaal Ahmad, Bahar	Box Office: Average
Aashiana	Altaf Hussain	Durdana Rehman, Raza Khan, Sangeeta	Box Office: Unknown
Anparh	Mohammad Fyaz	Rani, Ali Ejaz, Nanha, Nazli, Shahida Mini, Majeed Zarif	Box Office: Unknown
Soudaybazi	Nasir Hussain	Sultan Rahi, Anjuman, Ali Ejaz, Sangeeta, Nazli	Box Office: Unknown
Muqaddar	Haidar Chodhary	Rani, Iqbal Hassan, Sangeeta, Ghulam Mohiuddin, Zamurrad, Rangeela, Asad Bukhari, Bahar	Box Office: Unknown
Pukhay Bateray	Idrees Khan	Nanha, Ali Ejaz, Mumtaz, Babar Masud, Khanum, Rangeela, Zahir Shah, Bahar	Box Office: Unknown
Jagawar	Abid Shujaa	Sapna, Shehbaz Akmal, Firdous, Aurangzeb Laghari, Fida Malik	Box Office: Unknown
Khuddar	M.Akram	Anjuman, Sultan Rahi, Mustafa Qureshi, Iqbal Hassan, Aslam Parvez, Talish, Naghma, Bahar, Zamurrad, Khanum	Box Office: Unknown
Bau Jhalla	Mohammad Tariq	Durdana Rehman, Irfan Hashmi, Aliya, Albela, Fakhri Ahmad, Tariq Javed, Abid Kashmiri, Munir Zarif, Jaggi Malik	Box Office: Flop
Ghulami	Hasnain	Rani, Sultan Rahi, Yousuf, Mustafa Qureshi, Mohammad Ali, Afzaal Ahmad, Nanha	Box Office: Hit
Jagga	Masood Butt	Sultan Rahi, Anjuman, Mustafa Qureshi, Zamurrad, Nanha, Bahar	Box Office: Super Hit
Mehndi	Altaf Hussain	Anjuman, Javed Sheikh, Nanha, Rangeela, Afzaal Ahmad	Box Office: Hit
Shah Behram	Kaifee	Mohammad Ali, Sultan Rahi, Anjuman, Kaifee, Iqbal Hassan, Adeeb	Box Office: Average
Haq Mehar	Iftikhar Khan	Babra Sharif, Waseem Abbas, Iqbal Hassan, Zamurrad, Afzaal Ahmad, Firdous	Box Office: Average
Ziddi Khan	Haidar	Sultan Rahi, Anjuman, Mustafa Qureshi, Shahida Mini, Haidar	Box Office: Unknown
Halaku Tay Khan	Aqeel Gaba	Mumtaz, Yousuf Khan, Sultan Rahi, Mustafa Qureshi	Box Office: Average
2 Hathkarian	Hassan Askari	Rani, Shahid, Bazgha, Habib, Afzaal Ahmad, Zamurrad, Adeeb, Rangeela	Box Office: Average
Ham Aur Tum	Hassan Askari	Salma Agha, Javed Sheikh, Nanha, Afzaal Ahmad, Nasir Chann	Box Office: Average
Wadera	Daud Butt	Anjuman, Mustafa Qureshi, Ghulam Mohiuddin, Arifa Siddiqi	Box Office: Hit
Jani Dushman	Younis Qureshi	Mumtaz, Iqbal Hassan, Mustafa Qureshi	Box Office: Average

== Pashto Films 1985 (Jan-Dec) ==
Pashto	Director	Cast	Notes
Yarana	Darwesh	Badar Munir, Yasmin Khan, Khushi Maheen, Jameel Babar	Box Office: Unknown
Khan Babar Khan	Aziz Khan	Musarrat Shaheen, Badar Munir, Nemat Sarhadi	Box Office: Average]]
Sharif Badmash	Inayat Ullah Khan	Musarrat Shaheen, Badar Munir, Nemat Sarhadi	Box Office: Average
Khaibar Khan	S.Sunny	Yasmin Khan, Badar Munir, Nemat Sarhadi	Box Office: Unknown
Daghara	Nasir Raza Khan	Tariq Shah, Musarrat Shaheen, Asif Khan, Sangeeta, Jameel Babar	Box Office: Unknown
Darinda	Murtaza Qureshi	Nimmi, Badar Munir, Nasarullah Butt, Nemat Sarhadi	Box Office: Unknown
Da Dushman Kelay	Farooq Qaiser	Yasmin Khan, Badar Munir, Farooq Khan, Asif Khan, Surayya Khan	Box Office: Unknown
Janwar	Saeed Ali Khan	Musarrat Shaheen, Badar Munir, Bedar Bakht	Box Office: Unknown
Nehla Dehla	Yousuf Bhatti	Khanum, Badar Munir, Nemat Sarhadi	Box Office: Unknown
Shehzad Gay	Saeed Ali Khan	Sonia, Badar Munir, Nadia Hassan	Box Office: Hit
Da Aakhri Dao	Inayat Ullah Khan	Musarrat Shaheen, Badar Munir, Nemat Sarhadi	Box Office: Unknown
Da Marg Soudagar	Maqsood Khan	Musarrat Shaheen, Badar Munir, Humayun Qureshi, Shahnaz, Parveen	Box Office: Average
Niyyato Murad	Samad Khan	Yasmin Khan, Badar Munir, Humayun Qureshi, Nemat Sarhadi	Box Office: Unknown
Da Veenay Daray	Saeed Ali Khan	Musarrat Shaheen, Badar Munir, Nimmi, Deeba, Tariq, Nayyar Sultana, Saqi	Box Office: Unknown
Khaista Gul	Saeed Ali Khan	Musarrat Shaheen, Badar Munir	Box Office: Hit
Shehbaz Khan	Inayat Ullah Khan	Yasmin Khan, Badar Munir, Liaqat Major	Box Office: Unknown
Sher Dil Khan	Umar Farooq	Yasmin Khan, Badar Munir, Bedar Bakht, Nimmi, Aman	Box Office: Unknown
Qurbani	Tehsin Khan	Yasmin Khan, Badar Munir, Sanita Khan, Nageena, Khanum	Box Office: Hit
Zanawar	Saeed Ali Khan	Khanum, Badar Munir, Asif Khan, Mahjabeen Kazalbash, Sangeeta, Shehnaz, Nemat Sarhadi	Box Office: Hit
Insaniyat	Ramzan Babar	Musarrat Shaheen, Badar Munir, Ismael, Ghzala	Box Office: Unknown
Jageer	Taj-Ul-Malik	Yasmin Khan, Badar Munir, Musarrat Shaheen, Asif Khan	Box Office: Average
Aazadi	Saeed Anaskh Saeedi	Yasmin Khan, Badar Munir, Liaqat Major	Box Office: Average
Awaz	Yasmin Khan	Yasmin Khan Asif Khan, Nimmi, Abid Ali	Box Office: Average
Elaan	Darwesh	Yasmin Khan, Badar Munir, Rehman, Nemat Sarhadi	Box Office: Unknown
Aulad	Qaisar Sanober	Yasmin Khan, Badar Munir, Bedar Bakht, Naseem	Box Office: Unknown
Beqasoor	Yousuf Bhatti	Musarrat Shaheen, Badar Munir	Box Office: Unknown
Da Plar Gunah	Unknown	Nimmi, Badar Munir, Asif Khan, Shehnaz	Box Office: Unknown
Jan-O-Janan	Darwesh	Musarrat Shaheen, Badar Munir, Nighat Yasmeen	Box Office: Unknown
Neki Badi	Waseem Jan	Laela Shaheen, Badar Munir, Bedar Bakht, Nagina K, Parveen Bobby	Box Office: Unknown]]
Pukhto	Wazer-E-Azam	Yasmin Khan, Badar Munir, Asif Khan, Khanum	Box Office: Unknown

== See also ==
- 1985 in Pakistan
