= List of Pakistani films of 1982 =

A list of films produced in Pakistan in 1982 (see 1982 in film):

Title	Director	Cast	Genre	Language	Notes	References
Aahat	Mohammad Javed Fazil	Nadeem, Shabnam, Waheed Murad, Bindiya	Romantic musical	Urdu		
Aangan	Nazar-ul-Islam	Nadeem, Babra Sharif, Bindiya	Musical	Urdu		
Charda Suraj	Basheer Rana	Sultan Rahi, Mumtaz, Mustafa Qureshi, Ilyas Kashmiri	Musical	Punjabi	Music by Tafoo and lyrics by Khawaja Pervez	
Ek Din Bahu Ka	Shabab Kiranvi	Babra Sharif, Bindiya, Ayaz Naik, Bazgha	Musical	Urdu	Music by M. Ashraf	
Ik Doli	M. Akram	Sultan Rahi, Ilyas Kashmiri, Adeeb, Mustafa Qureshi	Action comedy	Punjabi		
Meherbani	Parvez Malik		Musical			
Mian Biwi Razi	Sangeeta	Nadeem, Kaveeta, Tahira Naqvi, Nanha	Comedy	Urdu	Music by Kamal Ahmed, Film songs by Taslim Fazli, Khawaja Pervez and Saeed Gillani	
Sangdil	Hassan Tariq	Nadeem, Babra Sharif, Bindiya	Musical	Urdu	Music by A. Hameed; received ten Nigar Awards, including best film and best director	

== See also ==
- 1982 in Pakistan
