= List of awards and nominations received by Waheed Murad =

Waheed Murad was a Pakistani actor. This is a list of his awards, honours and recognitions.

== Nigar Awards ==
Winner

- 1964 - Best Actor for Heera aur Pathar
- 1966 - Best Producer for Armaan
- 1969 - Best Actor for Andleeb
- 1971 - Best Actor for Mastana Mahi
- 2002 - Legend Award for Lifetime achievement

== Rooman Awards ==
Winner

- 1965 - Best Actor for Eid Mubarak
- 1966 - Best Actor for Armaan
- 1966 - Best Producer for Armaan
- 1969 - Best Actor for Andleeb
- 1974 - Best Actor for Phool Mere Gulshan Ka

== Graduate Awards ==
Winner

- 1969 - Best Actor for Andleeb
- 1971 - Best Actor for Mastana Mahi
- 1975 - Best Actor for Jab Jab Phool Khile

== Noor Jahan Awards ==
Winner

- 1966 - Best Actor for Armaan
- 1966 - Best Producer for Armaan

== Mussawir Awards ==
Winner

- 1975 - Best Actor for Jab Jab Phool Khile
- 1983 - Life Time Achievement Award

== Sindh Awami Awards ==
Winner

- 1975 - Best Actor for Jab Jab Phool Khile
- 1976 - Best Actor for Shabana

== PIA Arts Academy Award ==
Winner

- 1978 - Best Actor for Awaz
- 1979 - Best Actor for Behan Bhai

== AlFankar Awards ==
Winner

- 1978 - Best Actor for Awaz
- 1980 - Best Actor for Badnaam

== Shabab Awards / Shabab Memorial Awards ==
Winner

- 1967 - Best Actor for Insaniyat
- 1985 - Best Supporting Actor for Anokha Daaj

== Other awards ==
Winner

- 1969 - Chitrali Award: Best Actor for Andleeb
- 1969 - Khalil Qaiser Award: Best Actor for Andleeb
- 1969 - Curtex Award: Best Actor for Andleeb
- 1975 - Aghaz Award: Best Actor for Jab Jab Phool Khile
- 1978 - Chaministan International Award for Public Popularity Competition: Most Popular Film Star
- 1979 - National Award: Best Actor for Behan Bhai
- 1981 - Riaz Shahid Award: Best Actor for Gherao
- 1982 - National Academy Award: Best Supporting Actor for Aahat
- 2011 - Sitara-e-Imtiaz: Lifetime achievement award
- 2012 - 17th PTV Awards: Tribute to Pakistani Legends
- 2016 - ARY Film Awards: Legend award
