= Behan Bhai =

Behan Bhai may refer to:

- Behan Bhai (1968 film), a Pakistani film directed by Hassan Tariq
- Behan Bhai (1979 film), a Pakistani film directed by Nazar Shabab
