= Begum Jaan =

Begum Jaan may refer to:

- Begum Jaan (1977 film), a Pakistani drama film
- Begum Jaan (2017 film), an Indian Hindi period drama film
