= Footpath Ki Ghaas =

Pakistani television series

- فٹ پاتھ کی گھاس
- Genre: Drama
- Written by: Bano Qudsia
- Directed by: Muhammad Nisar Hussain
- Starring: Bindiya; Rubina Ashraf; Behroz Sabzwari; Waseem Abbas
- Country of origin: Pakistan
- Original language: Urdu
- No. of seasons: 1
- No. of episodes: 2

Production
- Producer: Muhammad Nisar Hussain

Original release
- Network: PTV
- Release: 1985

Footpath Ki Ghaas (Urdu: فٹ پاتھ کی گھاس, lit. 'Sidewalk Grass') is a 1985 Pakistani television series written by Bano Qudsia, adapted from her work of the same name, and produced and directed by Muhammad Nisar Hussain. It aired on PTV.

== Plot ==
Footpath Ki Ghaas centres on two sisters, Kulsoom (Bindiya) and Batool (Rubina Ashraf), who live with their mother Zubaida (Nighat Butt), a hospital nurse. Batool works in an office while Kulsoom is preparing for her examinations. Bashir (Farooq Zameer) cares for his ailing son Nadeem (Behroz Sabzwari), who is largely confined to bed. Wajid (Waseem Abbas) is a carefree man employed at a local office.

== Cast ==
- Bindiya as Kulsoom
- Rubina Ashraf as Batool
- Behroz Sabzwari as Nadeem
- Waseem Abbas as Wajid
- Nighat Butt as Zubaida
- Qavi Khan as Chacha
- Khayyam Sarhadi as Naeem
- Farooq Zameer as Bashir
- Khursheed Shoukat as Begum Sahiba
- Ejaz Qaiser as Postman
- Shahid Mubeen as Bookseller
- Naz Bashir-ud-Din as Lady
- Najam Begum as Lady
- Abu Shah as Old Man
- C.M. Munir as Professor
- Irfan as Furqan
- Kashif Yousaf as Amar
- Asim Bukhari as Maqbool

== Accolades ==
Year	Award	Category	Recipient	Result	Ref.
1986	6th PTV Awards	Best Actress	Bindiya	Nominated	
1986	6th PTV Awards	Best Writer	Bano Qudsia	Won	
