= Joora (film) =

Pakistani film

- جورا
- Directed by: Haider Chaudhry
- Written by: Younis Javed; Haider Chaudhry; Shahid Adeeb; Syed
- Produced by: Chodhary Sana Ullah
- Starring: Anjuman; Yousuf Khan; Sangeeta; Bindiya; Iqbal Hassan; Ali Ejaz; Seema Begum; Aslam Pervaiz; Ilyas Kashmiri; Salma Mumtaz; Adeeb; Saiqa; Irfan Khoosat; Bahar Begum; Musarrat Shaheen; Mehboob Alam; Jameel Fakhri
- Music by: M. Ashraf
- Distributed by: Sanai Industries Limited
- Release date: 11 April 1986
- Running time: 150 minutes
- Country: Pakistan
- Language: Punjabi

Joora or Jura (Urdu: جورا, lit. 'Couple') is a 1986 Pakistani film it was based on Younis Javed novel Ragon Mein Andhera but then it was also written by Younis Javed along with Haider Chaudhry, Shahid Adeeb. It was directed by Haider Chaudhry and produced by Chaudhary Sana Ullah. It stars Anjuman, Aslam Pervaiz, Yousuf Khan, Sangeeta, Bindiya, Iqbal Hassan and Ali Ejaz in leading roles.

== Plot ==
The story is about a police officer who believes in honest work and wants to remove corruption from the society. Later the police officer meets many people during a drug case investigation.

== Cast ==
- Anjuman
- Yousuf Khan
- Sangeeta
- Bindiya
- Iqbal Hassan
- Ali Ejaz
- Seema Begum
- Aslam Pervaiz
- Ilyas Kashmiri
- Salma Mumtaz
- Adeeb
- Saiqa
- Irfan Khoosat
- Bahar Begum
- Asim Bukhari
- Musarrat Shaheen
- Mehboob Alam
- Jameel Fakhri

== Production ==
The film was based on Younis Javed novel and originally Aslam Pervaiz and Iqbal Hassan were cast in lead roles but then changes were made and then Yousuf did Aslam's role as they both died at a car accident after finishing a shooting scene. Later, the film was completed in 1986.

== Music ==
All lyrics are written by Khawaja Pervaiz; all music is composed by M. Ashraf.

Joora
No.	Title	Singer (s)	Length
1.	"Channa Dub Chale Tare"	Noor Jehan	4:01

== Reception ==
The film was released on April 11, 1986, and it was a hit at the box office.
