= Sher Mama =

- Directed by: Imtiaz Quresh
- Written by: Imtiaz Quresh
- Produced by: Agha Imtiaz Ali Khan
- Starring: Sultan Rahi; Mumtaz; Iqbal Hassan; Mustafa Qureshi; Durdana Rehman Qavi Khan Nayyar Sultana; Saawan; Rangeela
- Narrated by: Agha Ishfaq; Khurram Choudhry
- Cinematography: Riaz Butt
- Edited by: M. Ashraf Bhatti
- Music by: Kamal Ahmed
- Production companies: Vilties Sound System; Sanay color laboratory
- Distributed by: Yaarana Productions
- Release date: 2 December 1983
- Running time: 136 minutes
- Country: Pakistan
- Language: Punjabi

Sher Mama (Punjabi: شیر ماما) is a 1983 Pakistani Punjabi language action film, directed by Imtiaz Quresh and produced by Agha Imtiaz Ali Khan. The film actors are Sultan Rahi, Mumtaz, Mustafa Qureshi and Iqbal Hassan.

== Cast ==
- Sultan Rahi
- Mumtaz as Noor
- Mustafa Qureshi as Kartar Singh
- Iqbal Hassan as Garnail Singh
- Durdana Rehman as Basanto
- Qavi Khan as Akbar
- Nayyar Sultana as Sabara
- Rangeela as Farangi
- Jaggi Malik as Kikara
- Sawan as Shamsher
- Khawar Abbas
- Tanni

== Songs (album) ==
All lyrics are written by Khawaja Pervez; all music is composed by Kamal Ahmed

Sher Mama album - track listing
No.	Title	Singer(s)	Length
1.	"Mere Charchay Gali Gali Mein Aa Noor Jehan.."	Noor Jehan	4:30
2.	"Enj Lagda Ae Tere Nal Muhabbat Ho Gai Ae.."	Noor Jehan	3:51
3.	"Tere Sadqay O Sardara To Ay Jindjan To Pyara.."	Noor Jehan	4:33
4.	"Nath Sonay Di Lishkan Mar Di.."	Naheed Akhtar	3:45
5.	"Boliyan Te Mere Yar Maulay Da Naa Ay.."	Noor Jehan, Naheed Akhtar	3:21
Total length:			19:01
