= Seeta Maryam Margaret =

Pakistani film

- Directed by: Hassan Tariq
- Written by: Agha Hassan Imtisal
- Produced by: Safdar Masud
- Starring: Rani; Muhammad Ali; Talish; Nayyar Sultana; Qavi; Deeba; Shahid
- Music by: A. Hameed
- Release date: 5 September 1978
- Country: Pakistan
- Language: Urdu

Seeta Maryam Margaret is a 1978 Pakistani Urdu-language film directed by Hassan Tariq.

It is written by Agha Hassan Imtisal with music composed by A. Hameed. It features Rani in the titular roles with Muhammad Ali, Talish, Nayyar Sultana, Qavi and Deeba in prominent roles with Shahid in a special appearance.

It was among the last films of Nayyar Sultana and earned a silver jubilee status at the box office.

== Plot ==
Safia abandoned her newborn twin baby girls at the side of the road and attempted to drown herself in a river. Two passers-by, a childless Hindu man named Bhagwan Daas and a Christian club owner known only as Mr Nameless, took the girls away.

Bhagwan Daas and his wife, Lajwanti, adopted one of the girls and raised her as their own daughter. They raised her according to their religion and named her Seeta. When Seeta was nearly eight, her birth mother found her and took her away to be raised according to Islamic teachings. They changed her name to Maryam and emphasised that she had been rescued, causing her to question her identity.

Meanwhile, Margaret, a popular dancer at the Blue Moon Club, was persuaded by Mr Nameless to exploit wealthy patrons who visited her. Margaret is Maryam's twin sister and later falls for Rashid, Maryam's cousin, who also loves her. When Maryam discovers that Margaret is her twin sister, she plans to switch places with her so that Margaret can experience the love she yearns for.

== Cast ==
- Rani as Seeta/Maryam & Margaret
- Muhammad Ali as Bhagwan Daas
- Qavi as Baqir
- Nayyar Sultana as Safia
- Talish as Mr. Nameless
- Deeba as Lajwanti
- Faraz as Rashid
- Ilyas Kashmiri
- Saqi
- Shahid (special appearance)

== Soundtrack ==
All lyrics are written by Qateel Shifai; all music is composed by A. Hameed

Seeta Maryam Margaret
No.	Title	Singer (s)	Length
1.	"Aye Bhai, Aye Mister, Kucchh Soch Samajh Kar Baat Karo"	Ahmed Rushdi
2.	"Yeh Na Socho Ke Main Kon Hun"	Naheed Akhtar
3.	"Hello Prince, Ache To Ho"	Mehnaz
4.	"Janay Mein Kon Hun"	Mehnaz
