= Farz (1973 film) =

1973 film

- Urdu: فرض
- Directed by: Laeeq Akhtar
- Screenplay by: Masroor Anwar
- Produced by: Shamim Ara
- Starring: Shamim Ara; Kamal; Nisho; Qavi; Saqi; Mumtaz; Ragni; Nanha; Saleem Nasir; Najma Mehboob; Mustafa Qureshi; Munawar Saeed; Sabira Sultana
- Music by: Nashad
- Production company: Shamim Ara Productions
- Release date: 16 January 1973
- Country: Pakistan
- Language: Urdu

Farz (Urdu: فرض, lit. 'Duty') is a 1973 Pakistani Urdu-language film directed by Laeeq Akhtar and produced by Shamim Ara under the banner Shamim Ara Productions.

Alongside Ara, the film stars Syed Kamal, Qavi, Nisho and Mumtaz.

The music was composed by Nashad.

== Plot ==
Set against the backdrop of War, the plot revolves around the services of the military and martyrs who sacrifice their lives for the country. It is story of a wife and mother who lost her husband and son for the sake of country.

== Cast ==
- Shamim Ara
- Syed Kamal
- Qavi
- Nisho
- Mumtaz
- Imran
- Saqi
- (Guest appearances: Ragni, Nanha, Sabira Sultana, Saleem Nasir, Najma Mehboob, Mustafa Qureshi, Munawar Saeed)

== Release and reception ==
The film was released on 16 January 1973.

The Statesman praised the film for its off-beat themes.
