= Ik Doli =

1982 film

- Directed by: M. Akram
- Written by: Hazin Qadri
- Produced by: Tufail Imran; Malik Salahuddin
- Starring: Sultan Rahi; Mustafa Qureshi; Aasia; Ilyas Kashmiri; Shama; Ishrat Chaudhary; Nanha; Rangeela; Adeeb
- Cinematography: Parvez Khan
- Edited by: Mosaddegh Sheikh
- Music by: Nazir Ali
- Production company: S.T.R Productions
- Release date: 12 March 1982 (Pakistan)
- Running time: 142 min
- Country: Pakistan
- Language: Punjabi

Ik Doli (Punjabi: اک ڈولی) is a 1982 Punjabi-language action comedy film from Pakistan. The film was directed by M. Akram. The story was written by Hazeen Qadri and the music was composed by Nazir Ali.

== Story ==
Johnny Machhi (Sultan Rahi) was a 'Kahar'. From the village of Chaudhry (Ilyas Kashmiri) a 'doli' was about to travel on the shoulders of this 'Kahar' today. Chaudhry's daughter (Shama) Shano's doli that on this occasion Chaudhry's two nephews Badru and Jiro (Adeeb) and (Jagi Malik) attacked. They strongly asserted their right that Chaudhry's daughter Ming was ours. We will not let her doli go to a third house. Chaudhry revealed in clear words that both of you are considered by the society as the leaders of rogue elements. I am a noble man and I have married my daughter to another noble man.

== Cast ==
- Sultan Rahi
- Mustafa Qureshi
- Aasia
- Ishrat Chaudhary
- Nazli
- Ilyas Kashmiri
- Imrozia
- Nanha
- Rangeela
- Khalid Saleem Mota
- Adeeb

== Track listing ==
No.	Title	Artist(s)	Length
1.	"Jan Jawani Sadqe Haan De Hani Sadqe Nain Mila Ke Wari Jawan.."	Noor Jehan	2:27
2.	"Ve Kahar Veera Sardar Veera Tere Hath Doli Di Mohar Veera, Doli Doley Na.."	Noor Jehan	4:15
3.	"Maar Maar Ke Aakkar Pahnni.."	Noor Jehan	3:18
4.	"Ve Gujra Chad De Arriyaan.."	Noor Jehan	3:17
5.	"Sapni Di Tor Tori Ik Ik More Murrye.."	Noor Jehan	3:21
6.	"Dilbar Dil Wich Aa Gaya.."	Noor Jehan	3:12
