= Nadamat =

2012 Pakistani television series

- Title screen
- Genre: Drama
- Written by: K Rehman
- Directed by: Dilawar Malik
- Starring: Sanam Baloch; Sajid Hasan; Shakeel; Zhalay Sarhadi; Shahood Alvi; Soniya Hussain; Shamim Hilaly
- Theme music composer: Waqar Ali
- Opening theme: Nadamat written by Sabir Zafar performed by Rahat Fateh Ali Khan
- Country of origin: Pakistan
- Original language: Urdu
- No. of episodes: 18

Production
- Executive producer: 1. FARSEntertainment
- Producer: FARS Entertainment
- Cinematography: Naveed Malik
- Editor: Waseem Malik
- Running time: ~40 minutes

Original release
- Network: Hum TV
- Release: 2 January – 30 April 2012

Nadamat (Urdu: ندامت) is a Pakistani television series aired on Hum TV during 2012. It is directed by Dilawar Malik and written by K Rehman. It shows the struggle of a woman after she gets married, and how she sacrifices and pushes through obstacles to keep her marriage going. At the end, she does achieve that, but at a cost.

== Synopsis ==
The plot mirrors the hard disposition of individuals and the obliteration that it causes.

The everyday routine of Dr. Tania transforms her into an experiencing hellfire inferable from her father, Nawab Shuja ud Din's one mix-up. As she goes out and goes to live with her better half, Sohail, she is stood up to by considerably more obstacles. Her dull past follows her like a shadow in her present for her husband treats her with doubt and contempt constantly. Other significant characters of the story are the couple pair Nasir and Kiran, and Nasir's sibling, Taifor. What disarray will Taifor, who has lived abroad, bring into his sibling and sister-in-law's lives? What sort of difficulties will Tania's past make for her? How can she handle her present?

== Cast ==
- Sanam Baloch as Dr. Tania
- Sajid Hasan Nawab Shuja ud Din
- Shakeel as Sohail
- Jahanara Hai as Kiran's mother
- Soniya Hussain as Anam
- Ayesha Gul as Zoha
- Taifoor Khan as Nasir
- Zhalay Sarhadi as Kiran
- Shamim Hilaly as Tania's aunt
- Bindiya as Farzana
- Shahood Alvi as Nasir
- Khizar Awan
- Imran Ashraf as Rohail
