= Afsana (1970 film) =

Pakistani romantic drama film

- Afsana film DVD cover
- افسانہ
- Directed by: Luqman
- Screenplay by: Anwar Sajjad
- Produced by: Asghar Ali Bandooq Wala
- Starring: Deeba: Waheed Murad; Rozina; Nanha; Kemal Irani; Asha Posley; Saqi
- Cinematography: Nabi Ahmad, Azhar Barki
- Music by: Nashad
- Production company: A.M.I. Productions
- Release date: 6 February 1970
- Country: Pakistan
- Language: Urdu

Afsana is a 1970 Pakistani Urdu romantic drama film directed by Luqman. The film starred Waheed Murad, Deeba, Rozina, Nanha, and others. One of the film's playback songs, "Yun Kho Gaye Tere Piyar Mein Hum" (vocalized by Mujeeb Alam) was a hit track of the time.

== Plot ==
A modest son of a businessman, Nasir, develops feelings for his classmate, Nahid, who comes from a low-income household. Both of their parents approve of their marriage after a brief drama. After returning from his wedding with Nahid, Nasir dies in a car accident and Nahid gets injured. Nasir's father designates his daughter-in-law as the successor while still alive. Here comes a criminal named Zafar, who resembles Nasir. He starts living with Nahid and her mother in Nasir's home under the guise of being a distant cousin of Nasir. Actually, Nasir's former colleague Ghazala, who was jealous of Nasir and Nahid's marriage, has enlisted him to take her revenge.

== Cast ==
- Deeba — as Naheed
- Waheed Murad — in dual roles as Nasir and Zafar
- Rozina — as Ghazala
- Nanha — as Nasir's friend Badar
- Kemal Irani — as Nasir's father
- Shakir
- Asha Posley
- Saqi
- Waheeda Khan
- Niggo
- Rajni
- Fattu
- Luqman

== Music and soundtracks ==
The music of Afsana was composed by Nashad and lyrics were penned by Tanveer Naqvi:

- Yun Kho Geye Teray Pyar Mein Hum, Ab Hosh Mein Aana Mushkil Hay... Singer(s): Mujeeb Alam
- Gila To Yeh Hay Keh Kyun Hum Nay Tujh Say Pyar Kiya... Singer(s): Mala
- Hum Aap Kay Hayn Janab-e-Aali, Na Ham Say Itna Hijab Kijiye... Singer(s): Ahmad Rushdi, Mala
- Hum Ko Tumharay Sar Ki Qasm, Pyar Tumhen Kartay Hayn Hum... Singer(s): Ahmad Rushdi
- Hum Ko Tumharay Sar Ki Qasm, Pyar Tumhen Kartay Hayn Hum... Singer(s): Mala
- Na Ham Tum Sya Juda, Na Tum Ham Say Juda Ho... Singer(s): Ahmad Rushdi

== Release and box office ==
Afsana was released on 6 February 1970. It ran for 28 weeks at the Karachi's theaters.
