= Chan Suraj =

1981 film

چن سورج Chan Suraj
- Directed by: Rauf Abbasi
- Written by: Saeed Sahili
- Starring: Sultan Rahi; Mustafa Qureshi; Mumtaz; Qavi Khan; Sabiha Khanum; Talish; Ilyas Kashmiri; Rehan; Rangeela; Ishrat Chaudhary; Altaf Khan
- Cinematography: Naseeruddin
- Edited by: M. Javed
- Music by: Wajahat Attre film song lyrics, Khawaja Pervez
- Production companies: Zaibyko Pictures; Bari Studio
- Release date: 11 September 1981
- Running time: 177 minutes
- Country: Pakistan
- Language: Punjabi

Chann Suraj (Punjabi: چن سورج) is a 1981 Pakistani Punjabi-language action film, directed by Rauf Abbasi and produced by Khursheed Ahmad. The film stars Sultan Rahi in the lead role with Mumtaz, Mustafa Qureshi and Talish.

== Cast ==
- Sultan Rahi as Heera
- Mustafa Qureshi as Suraj
- Mumtaz as Reshma
- Qavi Khan as Shaukat Ali
- Sabiha Khanum as Hajira
- Talish as Karnal
- Altaf Khan as Mr. Azam
- Ishrat Chaudhary
- Ilyas Kashmiri as Chaudhary Hashim
- Rangeela
- Rehan
- Changezi
- Saleem Hasan
- Iqbal Durani
- Nasrullah Butt
- Khawar Abbas
- Haidar Abbas

== Track list ==
#	Title	Singer(s)
1	"Shala Jeevay Sohna Yaar"	Noor Jahan
2	"Dil Nal Pyara Dildar Milan"	Noor Jehan

== See also ==
- List of Pakistani Punjabi films
