= Bahar Begum =

Pakistani actress

- بہار بیگم
- Born: Kishwar Hafeez; 1 August 1942 (age 84); Lahore, Punjab, British India
- Education: Convent of Jesus and Mary Lahore
- Occupation: Film actress
- Years active: 1956 - present
- Spouse: Iqbal Yusuf (ex-husband)
- Children: 2
- Relatives: S. M. Yusuf (father-in-law)
- Awards: Nigar Awards - Lifetime Achievement Award in 2002

Bahar Begum (born Kishwar Begum; c. 1942) is an actress best known for many Pakistani movies since 1956.

She was first introduced to the Pakistani film industry by the renowned film director Anwar Kamal Pasha in the film Chann Mahi (1956). Anwar Kamal Pasha is the one that gave her the professional film world name Bahar Begum. She later acted in Punjabi, Pashto and Urdu language Pakistani films and had a very active career from 1956 till the 2000s. She has more than 600 films to her credit and she has been reportedly given the title of 'Queen of Sentiments' (Malika-i-Jazbat) for playing the supporting roles in films.

== Early life and education ==
Bahar Begum studied at the Convent of Jesus and Mary Lahore, Pakistan.

== Career ==
Having grown up in Lahore, Pakistan, her career has centered on the Punjabi film industry, initially playing heroines and then "emotionally strong mothers", usually ending-up playing 'mother' to a popular lead actor of Punjabi films Sultan Rahi in his films during the 1980s. She has performed well in films playing a loud rural woman, especially the role of a Chaudhrani in Punjabi movies. Bahar Begum can speak Punjabi, Urdu, Pashto and English fluently.

== Personal life ==
Bahar Begum married director and actor Iqbal Yousuf, son of film director S. M. Yusuf. They have two children. The couple divorced some years later.

== Filmography ==
=== Television series ===
Year	Title	Role	Network
1996	Teesra Aadmi	Tehmina's mother	PTV
1998	Paranda	Begum Zara	PTV
2011	Akbari Asghari	Amma	Hum TV
2014	Bhabhi	Sarim's mother	ARY Digital
2017	Wafa Ka Mausam	Soni's mother	TV One

=== Film ===
Title	Released	Language
Chann Mahi	1956	Punjabi
Kartar Singh	1959	Punjabi
Watan	1960	Urdu
Aik Thi Maa	1960	Urdu
Salma	1960	Urdu
Sohni Kumaharan	1960	Punjabi
Mitti Diyan Moortan	1960	Punjabi
Laggan	1960	Urdu
Aabroo	1961	Punjabi
Jaduger	1961	Urdu
Mangti	1961	Punjabi
Tum Na Mano	1961	Urdu
Do Raste	1961	Urdu
Ajnabi	1962	Urdu
Suraj Mukhi	1962	Urdu
Dal Me Kala	1962	Urdu
Dhoop Chaon	1963	Urdu
Shararat	1963	Urdu
Suhaag	1963	Urdu
Azad	1964	Urdu
Bharjai	1964	Punjabi
Khandan	1964	Urdu
Lunda Bazar	1964	Urdu
Lutera	1964	Urdu
Mamta	1964	Urdu
Waris Shah	1964	Punjabi
Doctor	1965	Urdu
Kalay Log	1965	Urdu
Sanam	1965	Urdu
Jeera Blade	1973	Punjabi
Sargent	1977	Urdu
Sadqay Teri Mout Tun	1977	Punjabi
Begum Jaan	1977	Urdu
Aina	1977	Urdu
Wehshi Gujjar	1979	Punjabi
Sher Khan	1981	Punjabi
Chan Suraj	1981	Punjabi
Khan-e-Azam	1981	Punjabi
Jatt Da Vair	1981	Punjabi
Aangan	1982	Urdu
Charda Suraj	1982	Punjabi
Jatt Te Dogar	1983	Punjabi
Des Pardes	1983	Punjabi
Moti Dogar	1983	Punjabi
Rustam Te Khan	1983	Punjabi
Sher Mama	1983	Punjabi
Dara Baloch	1983	Punjabi
Sholay	1984	Punjabi
Pukar	1984	Punjabi
Khuddar	1985	Punjabi
Ghulami	1985	Punjabi
Qaidi	1986	Punjabi
Malanga	1986	Punjabi
Joora	1986	Punjabi
Gernail Singh	1987	Punjabi
Moti Sher	1987	Punjabi
Silsila	1987	Punjabi
Roti	1988	Punjabi
Sarmaya	1990	Punjabi
Sher Dil	1990	Punjabi
Kalay Chor	1991	Punjabi/Urdu
Riaz Gujjar	1991	Punjabi
Daku Raj	1992	Punjabi
Zamana	1993	Punjabi/Urdu
Pajero Group	1994	Punjabi/Urdu
Sher Punjab Da	1994	Punjabi
Zameen Aasman	1994	Punjabi/Urdu
Choorian	1998	Punjabi
Mehndi Waley Hath	2000	Punjabi
Soha Jora	2007	Punjabi
Khamosh Raho	2011	Urdu
Shareeka	2012	Punjabi
Shor Sharaba	2018	Urdu

== Awards and recognition ==
Year	Award	Category	Result	Title	Ref.
1993	Nigar Award	Best Supporting Actress	Won	Zamana	
1994	Nigar Award	Best Supporting Actress	Won	Zameen Aasman	
1999	Nigar Award	Special Award	Won	Millennium Award	
2002	Nigar Award	Lifetime Achievement Award	Won	Contribution to Cinema	
