= Aangan (1982 film) =

1982 Pakistani film

- آنگن
- Directed by: Nazar-ul-Islam
- Written by: Sofia Sultana
- Produced by: A. Waheed Murad
- Starring: Nadeem; Babra Sharif; Bindiya
- Music by: M. Ashraf
- Distributed by: Evernew Studios Lahore
- Release date: 3 September 1982
- Running time: 230 minutes
- Country: Pakistan
- Language: Urdu

Aangan (Urdu: آنگن, lit. 'The Patio') is a 1982 Pakistani film it written by Sofia Sultana and directed by Nazar-ul-Islam it was produced by A. Waheed Murad. It stars Nadeem, Babra Sharif and Bindiya in leading roles.

== Plot ==
The story is about two young lovers Nadeem (Nadeem) and Farzana (Babra) later they both get married despite the opposition from their parents. Later Farzana suspects due to some gossip that her husband must be liking Honey (Bindiya) who is an orphan and boss of her father's construction company.

== Cast ==
- Nadeem as Nadeem
- Babra Sharif as Farzana
- Bindiya as Honey
- Bahar Begum as Farzana's mother
- Nanha as Nadeem's father
- Agha Talish as Lawyer
- Bazgha as Nadeem's friend
- Santosh Kumar as Magistrate registrar
- Sajjad Kishwar as Mister
- Irfan Khoosat as Police Officer

== Music ==
All lyrics are written by Qateel Shifai and Himayat Ali Shair; all music is composed by M. Ashraf.

Aangan
No.	Title	Singer (s)	Length
1.	"Iss Duniya Ke Pehle Din Se Mujhe Talaash"	Mehnaz Begum & A. Nayyar	1:40
2.	"Mujh Ko Teri Wafa Ka Yaqeen"	A. Nayyar	4:00
3.	"Tum Na Karo Pyar"	Naheed Akhtar	4:10
4.	"Log Kehte Hain"	Mehnaz Begum	5:00
5.	"Mera Baalam Aane Wale Hai"	Naheed Akhtar	4:14
6.	"Jahan Tak Haden"	A. Nayyar & Mehnaz Begum	7:44
7.	"Chandan Ke Ubtan Se"	Mehnaz Begum	1:22
8.	"Saij Ki Har Shikan Se"	A. Nayyar & Mehnaz Begum	5:05
9.	"Bada Afsous Hai Daddy"	Naheed Akhtar & Mehnaz Begum	4:29
10.	"Tum Jo Honge Juda Ek"	Mehnaz Begum & Naheed Akhtar	4:24
11.	"Chupke Ke Zindagi"	Mehnaz Begum	1:54
12.	"Koi Pankhari Agar"	Naheed Akhtar	4:40
13.	"Tum Jo Honge Juda Do"	Mehnaz Begum	1:01

== Reception ==
The film was released on 3 September 1982, and it was a Silver Jubilee hit at the box office.
