= Behan Bhai (1979 film) =

Pakistani film

- بہن بھائی
- Directed by: Nazar Shabab
- Written by: Shabab Kiranvi
- Produced by: A. Hameed
- Starring: Waheed Murad; Rani; Mohammad Ali; Bindiya
- Music by: Kamal Ahmed
- Distributed by: Nazar Art
- Release date: 19 January 1979
- Running time: 150 minutes
- Country: Pakistan
- Language: Urdu

Behan Bhai (Urdu: بہن بھائی, lit. 'Sister and Brother') is a 1979 Pakistani film directed by Nazar Shabab and written by Shabab Kiranvi and produced by A. Hameed.

== Plot ==
The story is about two brothers Mehmood (Mohammad) and Hamid (Waheed) who are honest and are looking for a job. Later they meet a young girl (Rani) who is an orphan; they take her in their care. Then the younger brother Hamid meets a wealthy girl named Beena (Bindiya) who asks him to pretend to be her fake husband so that her grandmother (Sabiha) won't marry her to someone else.

== Cast ==
- Waheed Murad as Hamid
- Rani as Samina
- Mohammad Ali as Mehmood Mian
- Bindiya as Beena
- Sabiha Khanum as Qudsia Begum (Beena's grandmother)
- Nanha as Saith Sahib
- Ali Ejaz as Film director
- Rangeela as Taxi driver
- Kamal Irani as Doctor
- Saqi as 'The man on the street'
- Ibrahim Nafees as Doctor
- Shahnawaz Ghuman as Amjad

== Production ==
Behan Bhai was filmed in Lahore and it was presented by Nazar Art. Bashir Niaz wrote the dialogues and other crew included Chandra Mohan and Beli Ram.

== Music ==
All lyrics are written by Qateel Shifai and Saeed Gilani; all music is composed by Kamal Ahmed

Behan Bhai
No.	Title	Singer (s)	Length
1.	"Do Sathi Jeevan Kay, Ik Doojay Ka Sath Nibhaen Gay"	Mehdi Hassan & Mehnaz Begum	6:29
2.	"Hanstay Hanstay Jeena"	Mehdi Hassan	2:44
3.	"Is Dunya Mein Yaar, Ham To Rahay Anari"	Mehdi Hassan & Ghulam Abbas	4:37
4.	"Tera Mere Pyar Jo"	Naheed Akhtar	5:00
5.	"Do Dilom Ki Mukammal"	Mehnaz Begum & Mehdi Hassan	4:33
6.	"Teri Meri Yari"	Mehnaz Begum	4:05

== Awards ==
Year	Award	Category	Result	Recipients and nominees	Ref.
1979	PIA Arts Academy Awards	Best Actor	Won	Waheed Murad	
1979	National Award	Best Actor	Won	Waheed Murad	

== Reception ==
The film was released on 19 January 1979, and was a box office hit. It became a golden jubilee film.
