= Aap Ki Khatir (1980 film) =

Pakistani film

- آپ کی خاطر
- Directed by: Zeenat
- Written by: Haroon Pasha
- Produced by: Javed Iqbal & Pervaiz Iqbal
- Starring: Rani Begum; Shahid; Rahat Kazmi; Bindiya
- Music by: Nazir Ali
- Distributed by: Film B.R.B
- Release date: 1 February 1980
- Running time: 150 minutes
- Country: Pakistan
- Language: Urdu

Aap Ki Khatir (Urdu: آپ کی خاطر, lit. 'For Your Sake') is a 1980 Pakistani film directed by Zeenat, written by Haroon Pasha, and produced by Javed Iqbal and Pervaiz Iqbal. It stars Rani Begum, Shahid, Rahat Kazmi and Bindiya in leading roles.

== Synopsis ==
The story is about Seema (Rani) from a wealthy family who falls in love with Shakeel (Shahid), her friend from college. But due to some problems they don't get married. Later Anwar (Rahat) comes from London and falls in love with Seema. However Anwar falls ill and learns that he has an incurable heart problem. Despite everything, Seema chooses to marry Anwar and remains loyal to him. Meanwhile, Shakeel heads to a forest mountain area and stays at a hotel where he befriends Bindia (Bindiya), a friendly girl. She helps him move on.

== Cast ==
- Rani Begum as Seema
- Shahid as Shakeel
- Rahat Kazmi as Anwar
- Bindiya as Bindia
- Shehla Gill as Shehla
- Rangeela as Rangeela
- Aslam Pervaiz as Seema's father
- Nanha as Mehmood
- Ibrahim Nafees as Baba
- Saqi as 'Mister'
- Meena Daud as Anwar's mother

== Music ==
All lyrics are written by Khawaja Pervaiz; all music is composed by Nazir Ali

Aap Ki Khatir
| No. | Title | Singer (s) | Length |
|---|---|---|---|
| 1. | "Ajnabi Des Mein Thukraye Huway" | Mehdi Hassan | 4:30 |
| 2. | "Hont Si Kar Jiye, Gham Chhupa Kar Jiye" | Mehdi Hassan | 3:50 |
| 3. | "Waado Peh Kar Eitbar, Sajna" | Mehdi Hassan & Naheed Akhtar | 2:30 |

== Reception ==
The film was released on 1 February 1980, and it was a Silver Jubilee hit at the box office.
