= Begum Jaan (1977 film) =

1977 film

- Directed by: Hassan Tariq
- Written by: Agha Hassan Imtisal
- Produced by: Bahadur Shah; Abdul Quddus Khan
- Starring: Rani Begum; Shahid; Qavi; Bindiya; Aurangzeb; Rangeela
- Music by: A. Hameed
- Production company: Mughal Films
- Release date: 23 June 1977 (Pakistan)
- Country: Pakistan
- Language: Urdu

Begum Jaan is a 1977 Pakistani drama film directed by Hassan Tariq, and is a remake of his 1959 film Neend. The film stars Rani in the title role, alongside Shahid, with Qavi, Aurangzeb, and Rangeela in supporting roles.

The soundtrack, composed by A. Hameed with lyrics by Qateel Shifai, complements the film's narrative. Released on 23 June 1977, Begum Jaan was a commercial success.

The story revolves around a Pashtun woman who sells clothes door-to-door and faces societal challenges after giving birth to a child out of wedlock. Although granted a nationwide theatrical release, the film was censored and restricted in certain areas.

== Plot ==
The film revolves around Begum Jaan, a saleswoman who peddles smuggled clothing door-to-door after giving birth to a child out of wedlock. She becomes infatuated with Seth Shahid, a wealthy businessman who feigns piety to win her affection. Begum Jaan dreams of marrying him, but her wholesaler, Khasta Gul Khan, also vies for her hand.

One day, Begum Jaan is chased by police inspector Aftab, who suspects her of buying smuggled clothes. At the police station, Inspector Aftab's brother, Amjad, a columnist, intervenes and discovers Begum Jaan's innocence. He learns that she is merely a pawn in a larger smuggling operation involving wealthy individuals.

Begum Jaan's life takes a drastic turn when Seth Shahid assaults her and promises to marry her. She reports Khasta Gul Khan's smuggling to the authorities, leading to his arrest. However, when she becomes pregnant out of wedlock, the community shuns her. Amjad advocates for her justice, and together they confront Seth Shahid, who denies responsibility.

The case goes to court, where Shahid's lawyer disparages Begum Jaan's character. Despite her efforts to clear her name, Begum Jaan loses the case due to Khasta Gul Khan's false testimony.

Seeking revenge, Begum Jaan shoots Seth Shahid and surrenders to the police. After serving her sentence, she emerges from prison with her young son. Amjad awaits her, and when she asks why he has stood by her, he replies that their bond is rooted in humanity and truth.

== Cast ==
- Rani as Begum Jaan
- Shahid as Seth Shahid
- Aurangzeb as Aftab
- Qavi as Amjad
- Rnageela as Khasta Gul Khan
- Bindiya as Rosie
- Bahar Begum
- Albela
- Jamshed Ansari

== Soundtrack ==
Film's music was composed by A. Hameed and the film songs lyrics were by Qateel Shifai.

All lyrics are written by Qateel Shifai; all music is composed by A. Hameed.

Begum Jaan
No.	Title	Singer (s)	Length
1.	"Begum Jan, bhala kya janay"	Naheed Akhtar
2.	"Gharib Phir Gharib Hay.."	Mehdi Hassan
3.	"Janay Yeh Dil"	Naheed Akhtar & co.
