= Sajawal Daku =

1984 film

- original poster
- Directed by: Agha Hussaini
- Written by: Nasir Adib
- Produced by: Agha Hussaini; Suhail Hussaini
- Starring: Sultan Rahi; Mustafa Qureshi; Rani; Shagufta; Humayun Qureshi; Jaggi Malik; Habib; Nannha
- Cinematography: Imtiaz Qureshi
- Edited by: Shafqat Ullah Khan
- Music by: Nazir Ali
- Production companies: H – S Films; Evrenew Studio
- Release date: 12 October 1984
- Running time: 170 minutes
- Country: Pakistan
- Language: Punjabi

Sajawal Daku (Punjabi: سجاول ڈاکو) is a 1984 Pakistani Punjabi-language action film, directed by Agha Hussaini. The film stars Sultan Rahi in the lead role with Rani and Humayun Qureshi.

== Cast ==
- Sultan Rahi
- Mustafa Qureshi
- Rani
- Shagufta
- Humayun Qureshi
- Habib
- Nannha

== Track list ==
#	Title	Singer(s)
1	"Suj Bun Ke Tere Layi Aai"	Noor Jahan
2	"Badlay Ne Saah Te, Zamin Tapdi"	Noor Jahan
3	"Sohni Kurri Noun Billian Akkhan Dekhan Chori Chori"	Noor Jahan
