= Aahat (Pakistani film) =

Pakistani film

- آہت
- Directed by: Mohammad Javed Fazil
- Written by: Syed Noor
- Produced by: Atta Buzdar
- Starring: Nadeem; Shabnam; Waheed Murad; Bindiya
- Music by: Robin Ghosh
- Distributed by: Buzdar Productions
- Release date: 16 April 1982
- Running time: 150 minutes
- Country: Pakistan
- Language: Urdu

Aahat (Urdu: آہت, lit. 'Hurt') is a 1982 Pakistani film written by Syed Noor and directed by Mohammad Javed Fazil. It was produced by Atta Buzdar. It stars Nadeem, Shabnam, Waheed Murad and Bindiya in leading roles.

== Plot ==
A young boy Faraz goes abroad for further education leaving behind his waiting beloved Samina. Faraz childhood friend Bauli (Bindiya) is heartbroken and spends her time alone lost in her thoughts. With almost no contact for several years, he comes back to find out that things have drastically changed in his absence and learns that his beloved is now married to her cousin Asif (Waheed).

== Cast ==
- Nadeem as Faraz
- Shabnam as Samina
- Waheed Murad as Asif
- Bindiya as Bauli
- Najma Mehboob as Maria
- Nanha as Davidson
- Jameel Fakhri as Fakhri
- Agha Talish as Seth Firasat Ali
- Abid Kashmiri as Office worker
- Romana as Gulshan
- Saqi as Sahib
- Anwar Ali as Seth Zakaria Polani

== Music ==
All lyrics are written by Saeed Gilani; all music is composed by Robin Ghosh.

Aahat
No.	Title	Singer (s)	Length
1.	"Chamman Chamman, Kali Kali, Dagar Dagar, Gali Gali"	Akhlaq Ahmed	5:43
2.	"Rut Aae Rut Jaae Re"	Nayyara Noor	3:00
3.	"Waada Hai, Waada Ka"	Nayyara Noor & A. Nayyar	4:30
4.	"Waada Hai, Waada Ko Na Toren Gay Kabhi"	A. Nayyar & Nayyara Noor	6:28
5.	"Yaad-e-Mazi Azab Hai, YA Khuda, Cheen Lay Mujh Say Mera Hafza"	Mehdi Hassan & Nayyara Noor	4:00

== Accolades ==
Year	Award	Category	Result	Recipients and nominees	Ref.
1982	National Academy Award	Best Supporting Actor	Won	Waheed Murad	

== Reception ==
The film was released on 16 April 1982, and it was a Silver Jubilee hit at the box office.
