= Awaz (1978 film) =

1978 Pakistani film by Zafar Shabab

- Poster
- Directed by: Zafar Shabab
- Produced by: Zafar Shabab
- Starring: Waheed Murad; Shabnam; Ghulam Mohiuddin; Naghma; Mohammad Ali; Bindiya; Nanha; Najma Mehboob
- Music by: A. Hameed
- Distributed by: Zafar Art Productions
- Release date: 27 October 1978
- Running time: 180 minutes
- Country: Pakistan
- Language: Urdu

Awaz (Urdu: آواز, transl. The Voice) is a 1978 Pakistani Urdu language film, produced and directed by Zafar Shabab. The film stars Waheed Murad, Shabnam, Bindiya, Ghulam Mohiuddin, Naghma, Nanha, Najma Mehboob and Mohammad Ali. The film was released on 27 October 1978 in Pakistani cinemas.

== Cast ==
- Waheed Murad
- Shabnam
- Ghulam Mohiuddin
- Bindiya
- Naghma
- Nanna
- Najma Mehboob
- Muhammad Ali

== Soundtrack ==
Music was composed by A. Hameed and the songs were written by Saeed Gillani. Playback singers are Mehdi Hassan, Ghulam Abbas, A Nayyar, Naheed Akhtar and Asad Amanat Ali Khan.

=== Songs ===
- "Tu mere pyar ka geet hai..." by Mehdi Hassan
- "Tu mere pyar ka geet hai..." by Naheed Akhtar
- "Tu mere pyar ka geet hai..." by Asad Amanat Ali Khan
- "Suno suno, shehar ke basio..." by A Nayyar
- "Hari bhari abadian..." by Ghulam Abbas
