= Shahida Mini =

Pakistani actress

- Born: 1966 (age 59–60); Lahore, Punjab, Pakistan
- Occupations: Actress, singer, producer, composer
- Years active: 1982–present
- Children: Mehreen Atta (daughter)
- Relatives: Fahad Shaikh (son-in-law)
- Awards: Pride of Performance Award by the Government of Pakistan (2013)

Shahida Mini, also known as Mini (Urdu: شاہدہ منی), is a Pakistani film actress and singer. She runs her own production house called SM Production.

== Early life ==
Shahida Mini was born in late 1966 in Lahore, Pakistan. She completed her studies from the University of Lahore.

== Career ==
Shahida started singing at age 17. Shahida's parents encouraged her to sing and she started to sing at Radio Pakistan. Shahida began her career as a child artist and made her debut as an actress in the 1982 Punjabi movie Jahez.

She appeared in movies Insaf Ka Tarazo, Achha Shookar Wala, Dushman Dada, Damto Zor and Taubaa. Shahida also appeared in movies Chahat, Dil Lagi, Nargis and Dehleez. She also appeared on television in dramas Qafas and Manjhdaar.

== Personal life ==
Shahida Mini is married. She has one daughter named Mehreen Atta. Shahida's daughter is married to actor Fahad Shaikh.

== Filmography ==
=== Television ===
Year	Title	Role	Network
2000	Qafas	Shaista	PTV
2016	Manjdhar	Aapa	Geo TV
2016	Mazaaq Raat	Herself	Dunya News
2019	The Shareef Show Mubarak Ho	Herself	Geo TV

=== Film ===
Year	Film	Language
1982	Jahez	Punjabi
1983	Insaf Ka Tarazoo	Urdu
1983	Dehleez	Urdu
1983	Da Insaf Tala	Pashto
1984	Dada Ustad	Punjabi
1984	Barood	Urdu
1984	Taawan	Punjabi
1984	Naseebon Wali	Urdu
1984	Lagaan	Punjabi
1985	Ek Dulhan	Urdu
1985	Rishta Kaghaz Da	Punjabi
1985	Ziddi Khan	Punjabi
1986	Hitler	Punjabi
1987	Saas Meri Saheli	Urdu
1987	Son of Ann Daata	Urdu
1988	Jatt Majhay Da	Punjabi
1988	Basheera in Trouble	Punjabi
1988	Dushman Dada	Pashto
1988	Damto Zor	Pashto
1989	Ishq Rog	Punjabi
1989	Rogi	Punjabi
1989	Kalka	Punjabi
1989	Badshah	Punjabi, Urdu
1989	Dushman Dada	Punjabi
1990	Babrak	Pashto
1990	Palay Khan	Punjabi
1990	Tezab	Punjabi, Urdu
1990	Puttar Jaggay Da	Punjabi
1990	Number One	Punjabi, Urdu
1990	Sher Dil	Punjabi
1990	Ik Daka	Punjabi, Urdu
1991	Super Power	Punjabi
1991	Wehshi Dogar	Punjabi
1991	Gandasa	Punjabi
1991	Wardatia	Punjabi
1991	Lakhan	Punjabi
1991	Mastan Khan	Punjabi, Urdu
1991	Hashar Nashar	Pashto
1991	Betab	Punjabi, Urdu
1992	Shera Pandi	Punjabi
1992	Pabandi	Urdu
1992	Ashqi	Punjabi, Urdu
1992	Consular	Punjabi
1992	Kakay Da Kharak	Punjabi
1992	Zindagi	Punjabi, Urdu
1992	Dunya 10 Numbri	Punjabi, Urdu
1992	Sanwal	Punjabi
1992	Chahat	Punjabi, Urdu
1992	Deputy	Punjabi
1992	Achha Shookar Wala	Punjabi
1992	Nargis	Punjabi, Urdu
1992	Shama	Punjabi, Urdu
1992	Hero	Punjabi, Urdu
1992	Babra	Punjabi
1993	Noori Bahadur	Punjabi
1993	Faqeera	Punjabi
1993	Rambo 303	Punjabi, Urdu
1993	Guru Chela	Punjabi, Urdu
1993	Teesri Dunya	Punjabi, Urdu
1993	Anjuman	Punjabi, Urdu
1993	Farishta	Punjabi, Urdu
1993	Puttar Munawar Zarif Da	Punjabi, Urdu
1993	Sar-e-Aam	Punjabi
1993	Danday Da Dour	Punjabi
1994	Sanam Bewafa	Punjabi, Urdu
1994	Danda Pir	Punjabi
1994	Albela Ashiq	Urdu
1994	Jungli Mera Naam	Punjabi, Urdu
1994	Naseeb	Punjabi, Urdu
1994	Gujjar Punjab Da	Punjabi
1994	Puttar Jeeray Blade Da	Punjabi, Urdu
1995	Wehshi Aurat	Punjabi
1995	Mastana Mahi	Punjabi
1995	Golden Girl	Punjabi, Urdu
1996	Bazar Band Karo	Punjabi
1996	Choron Kay Ghar Chor	Urdu
1997	Miss Klashankoff	Urdu
1997	Teefa Gujjar	Punjabi
1998	Ziddi	Punjabi
2000	Meri Touba	Punjabi
2003	Lahori Thug	Punjabi

== Awards and recognition ==
- Nigar Award for Best Supporting actress in 1992
- Bolan Award in 1995
- PTV National Award for Best Singer of the Year 2002
- Graduate Award in 2003
- Asian Melody Queen Award in 2006
- PTV Prime Award UK in 2008
- Lifetime Achievement Award by the President of Pakistan in 2012
- Pride of Performance Award by the President of Pakistan in 2013
