= Shabab Kiranvi =

Pakistani film director, producer (1925–1982)

Shabab Kairanwi
- Born: Nazir Ahmed; 1926; Muzaffarnagar, United Provinces of Agra and Oudh, British India
- Died: 5 November 1982 (aged 56–57); Lahore, Punjab, Pakistan
- Occupations: Film director, producer, lyricist, novelist
- Years active: 1955 – 1982
- Awards: Special Nigar Award for 30 years of excellence in Pakistani film industry in 1981

Shabab Kairanwi (born Nazir Ahmed; 1926 – 5 November 1982) was a Pakistani film director, producer, and occasional screenwriter, lyricist and novelist. He debuted in the Pakistani film industry as a producer and lyricist with Jalwa (1955) while he made his directorial debut with Surayya (1961).

He directed more than fifty films out of seventy-five he produced. His films as a producer includes Surayya (1961) and Shama-e-Mohabbat (1977) among others. Most of his films revolve around social issues, social inequality concerning poor and rich besides creating comedy films. He made his first color motion picture film in 1969 with Tumhi ho Mehboob Meray. He worked as a scriptwriter in the film Bemisaal.

== Early life ==
He was born as Nazir Ahmed in 1926 in Muzaffarnagar, British India. He was originally a journalist who started his journalism career with film magazine titled Picture.

When he memorized the Quran during his primary schooling, he became known as Hafiz Nazir Ahmed. At 15, he started writing poems and chose the pseudonym "Shabab". He was a resident of Kairana and thus he became known as Shabab Kiranwi.

He and his family migrated to Pakistan following the partition of the Indian subcontinent and he settled in Lahore. He spent his initial time in poetry and took poetry classes from Tajvar Najibabadi.

== Career ==
Kiranwi started his career as a producer in 1955 with Jalwa. He made more than seventy-five Urdu films throughout his career. Some of his films became the recipient of Nigar Awards. His other films include Mehtab, which became one of the superhit films at the box office, leading him to establish his own film production company Shabab Studio. The production house was established at Thokar Niaz Beg, Lahore. It produced socio-romantic films until Kiranwi stopped working in films. It is now housing a film academy at the premises established by Syed Noor. Studio's first films was Insaniyat which also became a prominent film of his production company. It was a debut film of Tariq Aziz and Ali Ejaz. He later made Aina (1966), Sangdil (1968), Insan Aur Aadmi, Insaaf Aur Kanoon, Daman Aur Chingari (1973), Mera Naam Hai Mohabbat, Saheli, Naukar, Shamah, Aaina Aur Soorat (1974), and Shama-E-Mohabbat (1977) under his company's banner.

Most of his film music is composed by the music director M. Ashraf. 80% of Ashraf's songs became superhit. Kiranwi is accused of producing replica films based on Indian films than producing original works. Film Insaniyat (1967 film) is also said to be a replica of the Indian film Dil Ek Mandir (1963 film).

As a lyricist, his two poems such as Mooj Shabaab and Bazar Sada were published before his death. He was a student of Pakistani poet Ehsan Danish. As a novelist, he wrote more than twenty-four novels, including Phool Ke Saye, Ek Aurat Hazar Marhaley, and Dard-e-Dil Aur Khalish among others.

== As lyricist ==
=== Discography ===
- "Tu Jahan Kahin Bhi Jaye, Mera Pyar Yaad Rakhna" from Insan Aur Aadmi
- "Kya Mila Zalim Tujhe" from Mein Bhi Insan Huun
- "Yeh Wada Kiya Tha Mohabbat Karein Gay" from Daman Aur Chingari (1973 film)
- "Aankhen Ghazal Hai Aapki" from Saheli (1978 film)
- "Allah Teri Shaan" from Saheli
- "Ek Dard Sa Dil Me Uthta Hai" from Jalwa.

== Introduced new talent ==
Shab Kiranvi is credited with introducing actors Babra Sharif, Ghulam Mohiuddin, Ali Ejaz and Anjuman into the Pakistani film industry.

== Awards ==
Won a Special Nigar Award for 30 years of excellence in Pakistani film industry in 1981.

== Death ==
Shabab Kiranvi died on 5 November 1982 at Lahore, Pakistan. Among his survivors were two sons Zafar Shabab and Nazar Shabab.
