= M. Akram =

Pakistani film producer and director

- ایم اکرم
- Born: 28 March 1934; Gujranwala, Pakistan
- Died: 3 April 2016 (aged 82); Lahore, Pakistan
- Education: University of the Punjab, Lahore
- Occupations: Film editor, Film director
- Years active: 1951 – 2001
- Spouse: Manzooran Begum (married her in 1957)
- Children: Jafar Akram, Sadiq Akram, Parvez Akram, Rubina Akram, Samina Akram
- Awards: Won Nigar Awards in 1960 and 1961

M. Akram (28 March 1934 – 3 April 2016) was a Pakistani film director.

He made and directed many popular films in Punjabi language in the 1960s, 1970s and 1980s in Pakistan.

== Early life and career ==
Muhammad Akram was born on 28 March 1934 in Gujranwala, Punjab, Pakistan. His family shifted to Lahore in 1945, when he was very young. He finished his basic education in Lahore. Veteran Pakistani film director Anwar Kamal Pasha first helped him get a film editor's job in his film Dilbar (1951). Akram worked as a film editor from 1951 to 1958, in the beginning of his professional career. His first film as director was Ghar Jawai (1958) and then he gained some fame from the Punjabi film Banki Naar in 1966. His brother M. Parvez was a film producer who produced most of their common films.

== Major popular films ==
Listed below are some of his successful films:

- Ghar Jawai (1958)
- Baanki Naar (1966)
- Charda Suraj (1970)
- Uchha Naan Pyar Da (1971)
- Sultan (1972)
- Khan Chacha (1972) (A Diamond Jubilee film)
- Sidha Rasta (1974)
- Ishq Mera Naa (1974) (A Platinum Jubilee film)
- Hathiar (1979)
- Khuddar (1985 film) (A Golden Jubilee film)
- Sanjhi Hathkadi (1986)

== Awards and recognition ==
- Nigar Award for 'Best Editing' in film Shaam Dhalay (1960)
- Nigar Award for 'Best Editing' in Gulfam (1961 film)

== Death ==
He died on 3 April 2016 at Lahore, Pakistan.

== See also ==
- List of Pakistani directors
