= Rangeela (actor) =

Pakistani film actor, singer, producer and director

- رنگیلا
- Born: Mohammad Saeed Khan; 1 January 1937; Parachinar, Khyber Pakhtunkhwa, Pakistan
- Died: 24 May 2005 (aged 68); Lahore, Punjab, Pakistan
- Occupations: Actor; Comedian; Director; Producer; Singer; Composer; Writer; Bodybuilder; Painter; Distributor
- Years active: 1956 – 1999
- Spouse: 3
- Children: 14
- Awards: Pride of Performance Award by the President of Pakistan in 2005; 11 Nigar Awards in his entire film career

Mohammad Saeed Khan (1 January 1937 – 24 May 2005), better known by his stage name Rangeela, was a Pakistani actor, comedian, director and producer.

He was also a professional bodybuilder, a billboard painter, a writer (both a screenwriter and a lyricist), a film distributor, a singer and a music composer.

He is regarded as one of the finest comedians of the Pakistani film industry.

Beginning in 1956 with the Punjabi film Chann Mahi, he eventually performed in over 550 films in a career spanning over 4 decades.

== Early life ==
His birth name was Mohammad Saeed Khan and he was born in Parachinar, a city in the Kurram District of Khyber Pakhtunkhwa. His family moved to Peshawar when he was very young, He took a keen interest in bodybuilding and physical exercises as a teenager.

== Career ==
He moved to Lahore at a young age and earned his livelihood by painting billboards for the Pakistani film industry. Once, when the shooting of a film was taking place, an actor for a comedic role was needed. The film director asked Mohammad Saeed Khan to play the part which he did. All those present during the shooting were amused by his acting style and he became an actor through sheer luck. Rangeela made his professional cinematic debut in the 1958 Punjabi film Jatti, directed by M. J. Rana.

He started playing humorous roles in movies and became highly popular. In 1969, he formed 'Rangeela Productions' to produce his own movies. He not only produced films but also directed his productions, sang songs, and wrote some scripts as well. His movies, to the surprise of many film industry stalwarts, attracted a large number of viewers. The film Diya Aur Toofan, released on 9 May 1969, was Rangeela's directional debut. He directed numerous movies under the banner of Rangeela Productions. His acting was showcased in the film Rangeela (1970), in which he played the title role. His third consecutive hit film was Dil Aur Dunya (1971), starring Habib, Aasia and Rangeela. He brought to the film Dil Aur Dunya a sobering sense of a director's prowess which is the opposite to his celluloid persona.

When Rangeela produced film Dia Aur Toofan, he sang a song Gaa mere manwa gata ja re, janaa hai hamka duur under the music direction of Kamal Ahmed. People of the film industry were taken aback to know Rangeela was producing a film. The film attracted a large number of movie-goers. His song also became very popular.

== Family ==
He was married three times and had eight daughters and six sons. One of his daughter, Farah Deeba, is a politician in Lahore, another daughter is a CPA accountant based in the United States, while his son Zamar Khan acted in several TV and theatre dramas, sitcoms, and movies. Another son, Jahanzaib, acted in some movies before he quit showbiz.

== Death ==
Rangeela died of a cardiac arrest on 24 May 2005 at the age of 68.

== Selected filmography ==
Year	Film	Actor	Director	Producer	Screenwriter	Lyricist	Singer	Language	Notes
1956	Chhan Mahi	Yes						Punjabi	
1957	Daata	Yes						Urdu	
1957	Nooran	Yes						Punjabi	
1958	Jatti	Yes						Punjabi	
1959	Shera	Yes						Punjabi	
1960	Gulbadlan	Yes						Urdu	
1960	Salma	Yes						Urdu	
1964	Gehra Daagh	Yes						Urdu	
1964	Paigham	Yes						Urdu	
1965	Malangi	Yes						Punjabi	
1965	Dil Ke Tukre	Yes						Urdu	
1967	Imam Din Gohavia	Yes						Punjabi	
1969	Diya Aur Toofan	Yes	Yes	Yes		Yes	Yes	Urdu	
1970	Rangeela	Yes	Yes	Yes	Yes		Yes	Urdu	
1971	Dil Aur Dunya	Yes	Yes	Yes	Yes		Yes	Urdu	
1971	Dosti	Yes						Urdu	
1972	Ehsaas	Yes						Urdu	
1973	Rangeela Aur Munawar Zarif	Yes						Urdu	
1973	Insan Aur Gadha	Yes					Yes	Urdu	
1973	Ziddi	Yes						Punjabi	
1973	Kubra Ashiq	Yes	Yes	Yes	Yes			Urdu	
1973	Ik Madari	Yes						Punjabi	
1974	Do Tasweerain	Yes						Urdu	
1977	Begum Jaan	Yes						Urdu	
1977	Aj Diyan Kurrian	Yes						Punjabi	
1979	Behan Bhai	Yes						Urdu	
1979	Aurat Raj	Yes	Yes	Yes	Yes	Yes	Yes	Urdu	
1979	Khushboo (1979 film)	Yes						Urdu	
1979	Maula Jatt	Yes						Punjabi	Cameo appearance
1980	Nahin Abhi Nahin	Yes						Urdu	
1980	Aap Ki Khatir	Yes						Urdu	
1981	Amanat	Yes	Yes	Yes				Punjabi	
1981	Chan Suraj	Yes						Punjabi	
1982	Ik Doli	Yes						Punjabi	
1982	Charda Suraj	Yes						Punjabi	
1983	Sher Mama	Yes						Punjabi	
1984	Teray Ghar Kay Samnay	Yes						Urdu	
1984	Doorian	Yes						Urdu	
1986	Qaidi	Yes						Punjabi	
1987	Disco Dancer	Yes						Punjabi	
1987	Lady Smuggler	Yes						Urdu	
1988	Bazar-e-Husn	Yes						Urdu	
1989	Madam Bawri	Yes						Punjabi	Double role
1989	Rangeelay Jasoos	Yes						Urdu/Punjabi	Double role
1990	International Guerillas	Yes						Urdu/Punjabi	Double role
1990	Sarmaya	Yes						Punjabi	
1991	Kalay Chor	Yes						Urdu/Punjabi	
1992	Hero	Yes						Urdu/Punjabi	
1992	Abdullah the Great	Yes						Urdu/Punjabi	Double role
1997	Kurri Munda Razi	Yes						Punjabi	
1998	Nakhra Gori Da	Yes						Punjabi	
1999	Eik Aur Love Story	Yes						Urdu	

== Awards ==
- Nigar Award for Best Screenwriter, for film Rangeela in 1970
- Nigar Award for Best Comedian, in the film Dil Aur Dunya in 1971
- Nigar Award for Best Comedian, in the film Insan Aur Gadha in 1973
- Special Award from Nigar Awards for simultaneously playing three roles in the film Meri Zindigi Hai Naghma in 1972
- Special Award from Nigar Awards for his comic role in the film Naukar tay Maalik in 1982
- Nigar Award for Best story- writer, in the film Sona chandi in 1983
- Nigar Award for Best director in the film Sona Chandi in 1983
- Nigar Award for Best Comedian in the film Miss Colombo in 1984
- Nigar Award for Best Comedian in the film Baghi Qaidi in 1986
- Nigar Award for Best Comedian in the film Teen yakkay teen chakkay in 1991
- Nigar Award Special Awards, Millennium Award in 1999
- Pride of Performance Award in 2005 by the President of Pakistan for his contributions to the Pakistan film industry

== See also ==
- Music of Pakistan
- List of Lollywood actors
