= Rani Begum =

Pakistani actress and model

- رانی بیگم
- Born: Nasira Begum; 8 December 1946; Lahore, Punjab, British India
- Died: 27 May 1993 (aged 46); Karachi, Pakistan
- Other names: The Dancing Queen; Lux Girl; Queen of Lollywood
- Occupations: Actress; model
- Years active: 1962 – 1993
- Spouses: Hassan Tariq (m. 1970; div. 1977) Mian Javed Qamar (m. 1979; div. 1980) Sarfraz Nawaz (m. 1982; div. 1991)
- Children: 1
- Awards: Won 3 Nigar Awards in 1968, 1971 and 1983

Rani Begum (Punjabi, Urdu: رانی بیگم; 8 December 1946 – 27 May 1993) was a Pakistani film and television actress. She gained success in the late 1960s when she made a hit pair with Waheed Murad. She was also known as The Dancing Queen, Queen of Lollywood and Lux Girl for her portrayal of romantic and dancing roles in films. She remained one of the most successful actresses of the subcontinent and was also popular for her dance performances in films.

== Early life ==
Rani Begum was born on 8 December 1946 as Nasira in Mozang, Lahore to Malik Muhammed Shafi and Iqbal Begum in an Punjabi Arain family. Her father was a driver for Mukhtar Begum, a singer who was married to Agha Hashar Kashmiri, a well-known Urdu dramatist. Mukhtar Begum took over and raised Rani herself. After being raised by Mukhtar Begum, Rani moved in with her mother with whom she reconciled.

== Acting career ==
Rani acted in both Urdu and Punjabi movies in Pakistani cinema. In 1962, Anwar Kamal Pasha gave Rani her first role in Mehboob. For several years after Mehoob, Rani appeared in supporting roles in films like Mouj Maila, Ek Tera Sahara and Safaid Khoon. Until 1965 she starred in other films, but when they flopped one after another she was dubbed a jinxed actress.

However, after the success of Hazar Dastan (1965) and Devar Bhabi (1967), Rani became a leading actress. Some of her more notable films are Chann Makhna, Sajjan Pyara, Jind Jan, Duniya Matlab Di, Anjuman, Tehzeeb, Umrao Jaan Ada, Naag Muni, Seeta Maryam Margaret, Aik Gunnah Aur Sahi and Surraya Bhopali. In Umrao Jaan Ada, she portrayed an ill-fated tawaif and poetess from Lucknow. In a review of the film, The Statesman noted that she has "worked hard with dances", "acted very well in the love scenes", and "has come off very well as Umrao". In 1974, she portrayed Laila in Laila Majnu, based on the eponymous legend. In the same year, she portrayed a halala victim torn between her two lovers in Deedar. In 1975, she portrayed a Romani girl who falls for an urban man in Dilruba. In 1978, she played dual roles in Seeta Maryam Margaret, portraying twin sisters raised in different religious backgrounds. She also acted in two TV serials Khuwahish and Fareb in the early 1990s.

== Personal life ==
After her initial success in the late 1960s, she married renowned director Hassan Tariq, with whom she had a daughter, Rabia. Due to conflicts, Hassan Tariq divorced Rani in the late 1970s. She then married producer Mian Javed Qamar, who divorced her when it was discovered that Rani had leukemia. During her treatment in London, she met famous cricketer Sarfaraz Nawaz. Soon they developed a good relationship with each other and got married. Rani helped Sarfraz in his election campaign in the late 1980s. But their relationship also did not last long and they parted. After getting divorced for the third time, Rani was struck by the grief of loneliness. Cancer also struck back and this time with much more intensity as Rani did not have much desire to live but to see her daughter get married.

== Illness and death ==
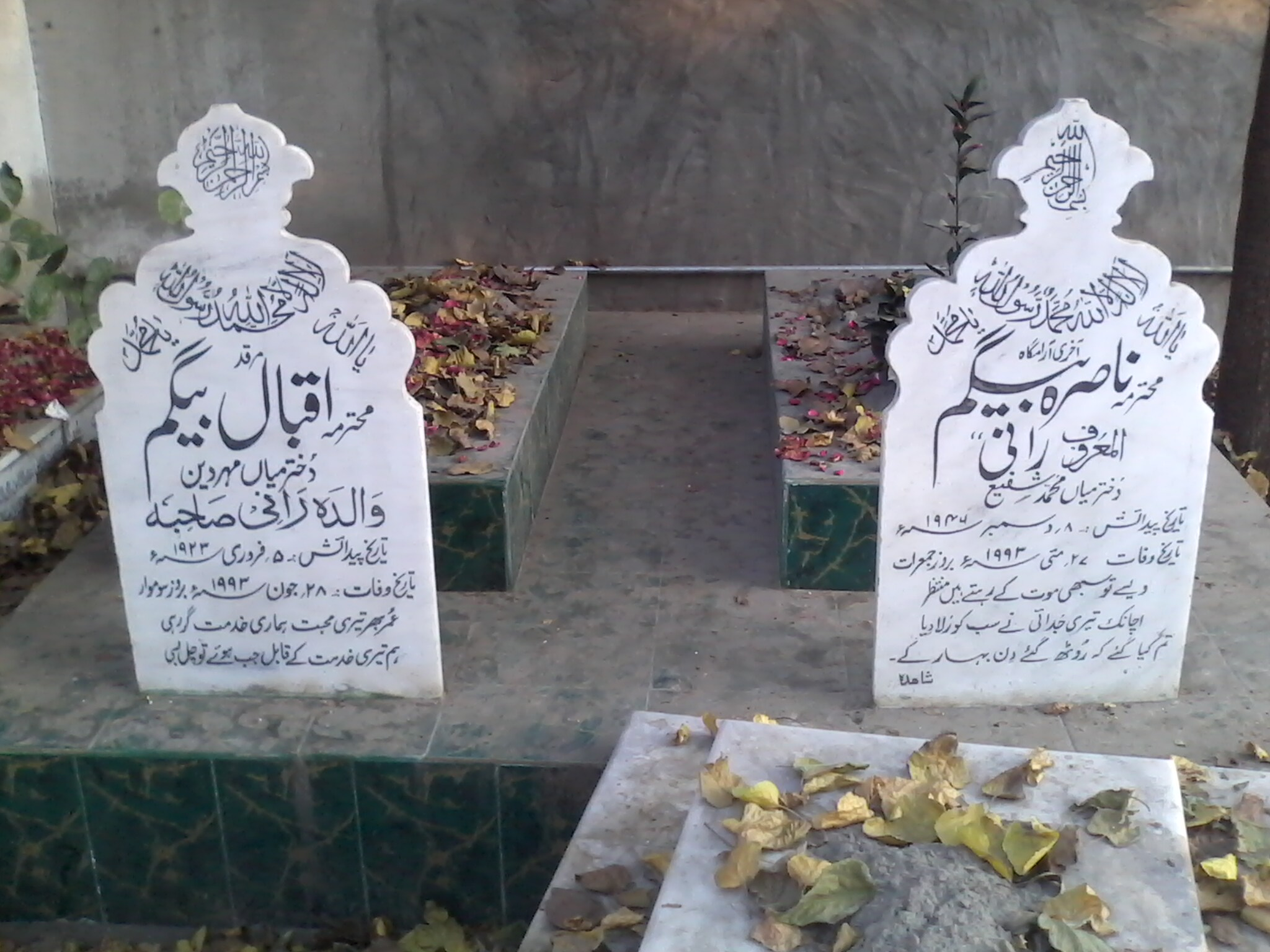
Graves of Rani and her mother

Tombstone of Rani's Grave

Rani died of cancer on 27 May 1993 at the age of 46 in Karachi, just a few days after her daughter Rabia's marriage. Shortly after Rani's death, her mother who was seriously ill and never knew of her daughter's death, also died. Rani's only sister also died three months later. Rani and her mother were buried side by side in Lahore in Muslim Town Cemetery.

== Filmography ==
=== Television series ===
Year	Title	Role	Network
1986	Show Time	Herself	PTV
1993	Khuwahish	Nafeesa Begum	PTV
1993	Fareb	Shabahat	PTV

=== Film ===
Year	Title	Role	Ref.
1962	Mehboob		
1963	Ik Tera Sahara		
1963	Mauj Mela		
1964	Aurat Ka Pyar		
1964	Chhoti Ammi		
1964	Chhoti Behan		
1964	Ik Dil Do Deewane		
1964	Safaid Khoon		
1964	Shatranj		
1965	Aakhri Station	Fozia	
1965	Aurat		
1965	Hazar Dastaan		
1965	Nache Nagan Baje Been		
1965	Sanam		
1965	Saaz-o-Awaz		
1965	Shabnam		
1965	Yeh Jahan Wale		
1966	Bhai Jaan		
1966	Ghar ka Ujala		
1966	Goonga		
1966	Insaan		
1966	Joker		
1966	Woh Kaun Thi		
1967	Bereham		
1967	Devar Bhabhi		
1967	Hokumat		
1967	Kafir		
1967	Nadira		
1967	Shab-ba-Khair		
1967	Sitamgar		
1967	Yatim		
1968	Adalat	Reshma	
1968	Behan Bhai		
1968	Chan Choudvin Da		
1968	Chan Makhnan		
1968	Cheen Le Azadi		
1968	Commander		
1968	Dara		
1968	Dil Mera Dharkan Teri	Nadira	
1968	Eik Hi Rasta		
1968	Mera Ghar Meri Jannat	Mona	
1968	Sajjan Pyara		
1968	Zalim		
1969	Dilbar Jani		
1969	Dil-e-Baitab		
1969	Diya Aur Toofan	Salma	
1969	Ghabru Put Punjab De		
1969	Jindjan		
1969	Khoon Nahaq		
1969	Kochwaan		
1969	Maa Beta		
1969	Mukhra Chan Warga		
1969	Panchi te Pardesi		
1970	Aakhri Chattan		
1970	Anjuman	Anjuman	
1970	Chan Sajna		
1970	Dil Diyan Laggian		
1970	Do Nain Sawali		
1970	Duniya Matlab Di		
1970	Mehram Dil Da		
1970	Mr. 420		
1970	Rab di Shan		
1970	Sajjan Beli		
1970	Shama Aur Parwana		
1970	Taxi Driver		
1971	Babul		
1971	Des Mera Jidaran Da		
1971	Do Baghi		
1971	Ishq Bina ki Jeena		
1971	Jeyo Jatta		
1971	Mr. 303		
1971	Rab Rakha		
1971	Sakhi Lutera		
1971	Siran Nal Sardarian		
1971	Sucha Sauda		
1971	Tehzeeb	Tehzeeb	
1971	Uncha Naa Pyar Da		
1971	Wehshi		
1972	Azaadi		
1972	Badley Gi Duniya Saathi		
1972	Baharo Phool Barsao	Salma	
1972	Bhai Bhai		
1972	Dhol Jawanian Mane		
1972	Dil Naal Sajjan De		
1972	Ghairat Te Qanoon		
1972	Khalish		
1972	Meri Ghairat Teri Izzat		
1972	Naag Muni	Neera / Naag Muni	
1972	Sodagar		
1972	Umrao Jaan Ada	Umrao Jaan Ada	
1973	Ek thi Larki		
1973	Jeib Kutra		
1973	Pyasa		
1974	Deedar		
1974	Laila Majnoo	Laila	
1974	Zulm Kade Nein Phalda		
1975	Dilruba		
1975	Aik Gunnah Aur Sahi	Afshan	
1975	Pulekha		
1976	Aulad		
1976	Naag aur Nagin		
1976	Surraya Bhopali	Surraya Bhopali	
1976	Zaroorat		
1977	Begum Jan	Begum Jan	
1977	Kaloo		
1978	Nazrana		
1978	Parakh		
1978	Saheli		
1978	Seeta Maryam Margaret	Seeta/Maryam, Margaret	
1979	Ab Ghar Jane Do		
1979	Aurat Raj		
1979	Behan Bhai		
1979	Ibadat		
1979	Josh		
1979	Khushboo		
1979	Mr. Ranjha		
1979	Naqsh-e-Qadam		
1979	Nawabzadi		
1979	Nai Tehzeeb		
1979	Tarana		
1980	Badnaam		
1980	Haye Yeh Shohar		
1980	Aap Ki Khatir		
1980	Lahoo De Rishte		
1980	Sheikh Chilli		
1981	Gun Man		
1981	Watan		
1982	Kinara		
1982	Aas Paas		
1983	Bigri Naslen		
1983	Deewana Mastana		
1983	Wadda Khan		
1983	Kala Sumandar		
1983	Sona Chandi		
1984	Chor Chokidar		
1984	Dada Ustad		
1984	Devar Bhabhi		
1984	Iman Te Farangi		
1984	Ishq Pecha		
1984	Jagga Te Reshma		
1984	Judai		
1984	Laraka		
1984	Raja Rani		
1984	Sajawal Daku		
1984	Ucha Shamla Jatt Da		
1984	Aag Ka Sumandar		
1984	Aaj Ka Inssan		
1985	Ann Parh		
1985	Babur Khan		
1985	Chandni		
1985	Chann Baloch		
1985	Do Hathkarian		
1985	Ek Dulhan		
1985	Ghulami		
1985	Khoon Aur Pani		
1985	Khuddar		
1985	Muqaddar		
1985	Sahib Bahadur		
1985	Thugg Badshah		
1986	Chall So Chall		
1986	Qulli		
1986	Shehnai		
1987	Kala Toofan		
1987	Zalzala		
1987	Zidbazi		
1988	Jatt Majhay Da		
1989	Aap Ki Khatir		
1991	Yohnavey		
1991	Truck Driver		

== Awards and recognition ==
Year	Award	Category	Result	Title	Ref.
1968	Nigar Award	Special Award	Won	Mera Ghar Meri Jannat	
1971	Nigar Award	Best Actress	Won	Babul	
1983	Nigar Award	Best Actress	Won	Sona Chandi	

== See also ==
- List of Pakistani actresses
