= Nanha =

Pakistani film and television actor (1942 - 1986)

- ننھا
- Born: Rafi Khawar; 4 August 1942
- Died: 2 June 1986 (aged 43); Lahore, Punjab, Pakistan
- Occupations: Actor, comedian
- Years active: 1966–1986
- Awards: Won 3 Nigar Awards during his career

Rafi Khawar (Punjabi, Urdu: رفیع خاور) (4 August 1942 – 2 June 1986), popularly known as Nanha (Urdu: ننھا), was a Pakistani actor and comedian. He started his film career in 1966 and earned several awards, including three Nigar Awards.

== Career ==
His first Urdu language film was Watan Ka Sipahi, released in 1966. Nanha got a breakthrough from film Noukar in 1976. He played the lead role in film Tehka Pehlwan in 1979, and in the same year his film Dubai Chalo was a super hit at the box office. His pairing with fellow comedian Ali Ejaz was popular since film Insaniyat (1967). Ali Ejaz and Nanha, as popular pair of comedians, were seen together in more than 50 films.

He was regarded as a comedy talent, and for many years was the star of the widely popular Pakistan Television Corporation TV show Alif Noon, which ran for three seasons during the early 1980s. Nanha acted in Alif Noon with his fellow comedian Kamal Ahmed Rizvi who portrayed Allan in the TV show.

A supporting actress and a then popular film dancer named Nazli usually appeared with Nanha as his love interest in his film appearances. They were also often seen together in public and became romantically involved in real life. Nanha's success in films and celebrity status was at an all-time high, which meant that money was never an issue with Nanha during his love affair with Nazli. He even pressured his film producers to cast Nazli with him in many films and the pair became inseparable in the early 1980s. This was not to last after Nanha's films started to flop and he fell on hard times financially. Then Nazli also started to lose interest in him.

== Death ==
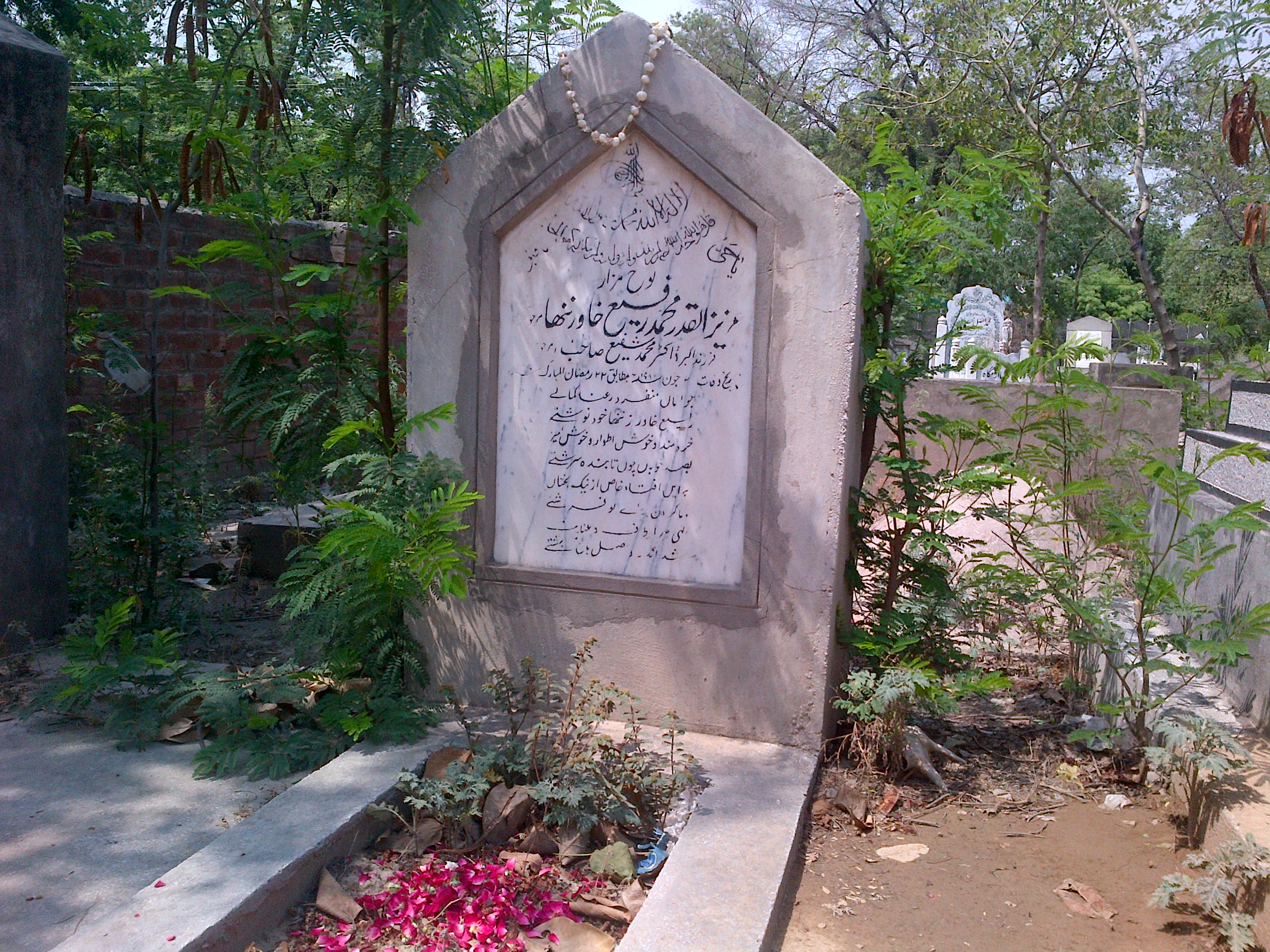
Nanha's grave at Karim Block Graveyard, Allama Iqbal Town, Lahore

Certain mysterious circumstances reportedly and allegedly drove Nanha to commit suicide by shooting himself with a shotgun on 2 June 1986. His final resting place is in a cemetery located in Karim Block, Allama Iqbal Town, Lahore, Pakistan.

== Filmography ==
Year	Film	Role	Note
1970	Afsana		
1970	Love in Jungle		
1973	Khushia		
1973	Jaal		
1973	Farz		
1974	Tum salamat raho		
1974	Khatarnak		
1976	Naukar		
1976	Hukam Da Ghulam		
1977	Naya Suraj		
1977	Sargent		
1978	Awaz		
1978	Ranga Daku		
1979	Dubai Chalo		
1979	Behan Bhai		
1979	Waaday Ki Zanjeer		
1979	Aurat Raj		
1980	Nahin Abhi Nahin		
1980	Sohra Te Jawai		
1980	Aap Ki Khatir		
1981	Athra Puttar		
1981	Sala Sahib		
1981	Jeedar		
1981	Sher Khan		
1982	Dostana		
1982	Naukar Te Malik		
1982	Ik Doli		
1982	Aahat		
1982	Aangan		
1983	Sona Chandi		
1984	Judai		
1984	Sholay		
1984	Kamyabi		
1984	Doorian		
1984	Sajawal Daku		
1985	Ghulami		
1985	Choorian		
1986	Qaidi		
1986	Malanga		
1986	Mela		
1987	Disco Dancer		
1987	Gernail Singh		

== Awards ==
Year	Award	Group	Film	Result
1977	Nigar Award	Best Comedian	Bharosa	Won
1978	Nigar Award	Best Comedian	Playboy	Won
1983	Nigar Award	Best Comedian	Love Story	Won

== See also ==
- List of Lollywood actors
