= Bindiya (Pakistani actress) =

Pakistani actress

- بندیا
- Born: Rubina Ahmad; 2 May 1960 (age 65); Lahore, Pakistan
- Education: University of Lahore
- Occupations: Actress; Singer; Newscaster
- Years active: 1973 – present
- Spouses: Zafar Ibrahim (m. 2013) Asad Nazir (m. 1997; div. 1999) Muhammad Al-khumaish (m. 1980; div. 1986)
- Children: 1
- Relatives: Vaneeza Ahmad (niece); Meena Pervaiz (sister)

Bindiya is a Pakistani actress and singer. She is known for her roles in dramas Noor Bano, Nadamat, Samundar, Thakan, and Meri Behan Maya, and has also acted in Urdu and Punjabi films, including Begum Jaan, Awaz, Pakeeza, Behan Bhai, Ek Din Bahu Ka, and Joora. She is one of the most popular actress of her time and was one of the most successful actresses of the 1970s, 1980s, and 1990s.

== Early life ==
Bindiya's parents lived in Calcutta. Her mother was from Calcutta, and her father was from Bengal. After Partition, her parents migrated from India to Pakistan and settled in Lahore. Bindiya was born in 1960 in Lahore, Pakistan, and completed her studies at the University of Lahore, graduating with a master's degree in English literature.

== Career ==
Bindiya started working as an English newscaster on PTV, and later she made her debut as an actress in drama Jhok Siyal. Then she appeared in the dramas Chattan Par Ghonsala, Samundar, Din, and Aik Din. She also appeared in dramas Drama 83, Andhera Ujala, Status, and Footpath Ki Ghaas. In the late 1980s, she worked in theatre with Saba Hameed and Samina Ahmad. Then, she worked in films both Urdu and Punjabi, including Khan Baloch, Begum Jaan, Awaz, Pakeeza, Behan Bhai, Ek Din Bahu Ka, Joora, and Aahat.

In 1980s during her peak, she was offered a role in a film by Indian film director Yash Chopra but she refused.

Since then she has appeared in the dramas Meri Behan Maya, Noor Bano, Nadamat, and Takkay Ki Ayegi Baraat.

== Personal life ==
Bindiya first married Muhammad Al-khumaish, a pilot from Jordan, in the 1980s, but later she divorced him and took custody of her only son, Jahanzeb. Then she married actor Asad Nazir; after one-and a half years, she divorced him. In 2013, she married Zafar Ibrahim. Bindiya's sister Meena Pervaiz was a newscaster, and her niece Vaneeza Ahmad is an actress, model and occasional singer.

== Filmography ==
=== Television ===
Year	Title	Role	Network
1973	Jhok Siyal	Sania	PTV
1975	Moorat	Zohra	PTV
1981	Chattan Par Ghonsala	Hina Shaukat	PTV
1983	Samundar	Nosheen	PTV
1983	Qasai Aur Mehngai	Zartaj	PTV
1984	Khul Ja Simsim	Ayesha	PTV
1984	20 Golden Years Of PTV	Herself	PTV
1984	Andhera Ujala	Nasreen	PTV
1984	Status	Shahina	PTV
1985	Footpath Ki Ghaas	Kulsoom	PTV
1986	Aik Din Raat	Naheed	PTV
1988	Gumshuda	Afshan	PTV
1989	Neelay Hath	Sajida Hameed	PTV
1990	Baraf Ke Rang	Rita Raty	STN
1992	Din	Tabinda	PTV
1993	Aik Shaam Din Ke Naam	Herself	PTV
2006	Dobara	Aroosa	PTV
2007	Mithaas	Reshma	PTV
2009	Sitarey	Sitara	PTV
2009	Tinkay	Zari	PTV
2010	Noor Bano	Alvina's mother	Hum TV
2011	Jee Saheeli	Herself	A-Plus
2011	Nadamat	Farzana	Hum TV
2011	Tera Pyar Nahi Bhoole	Walusha	PTV
2011	Takkay Ki Ayegi Baraat	Sukaina's mother	Geo TV
2012	Thakan	Izmat	ARY Digital
2012	Chalo Phir Se Jee Kar Dekhain	Zaitoon Bano	PTV
2012	Anushka	Romana	PTV
2012	Meri Behan Maya	Attiya Shahzeb	Geo Entertainment
2014	Tum Woh Nahi	Munazzah	Express Entertainment
2020	The Shareef Show Mubarak Ho	Herself	Geo Entertainment

=== Film ===
Year	Film	Language
1977	Begum Jaan	Urdu
1977	Yadon Ki Barat	Urdu
1978	Nazrana	Urdu
1978	Awaz	Urdu
1978	Shola	Punjabi
1979	Mr. Ranjha	Urdu
1979	Tandur	Pashto
1979	Waaday Ki Zanjeer	Urdu
1979	Behan Bhai	Urdu
1979	Tarana	Urdu
1979	Pakeeza	Urdu
1980	Aap Ki Khatir	Urdu
1980	Chotay Nawab	Urdu
1980	Jhagra	Punjabi
1980	Sathi	Urdu
1981	Bara Aadmi	Urdu
1981	Moula Jatt Tay Noori Natt	Punjabi
1981	Mr. Aflatoon	Punjabi
1981	Aladin	Urdu
1981	Rustam	Punjabi
1981	Tangay Wali	Urdu
1982	Sangdil	Urdu
1982	Aangan	Urdu
1982	Aahat	Urdu
1982	Bivian Hey Bivian	Urdu
1982	Ek Din Bahu Ka	Urdu
1984	Muqaddar Ka Sikandar	Urdu
1984	Shadi Magar Aadhi	Urdu
1985	Khan Baloch	Siraiki
1985	Deewanay Do	Urdu
1986	Joora	Punjabi
1986	Poti Ain Pag	Pashto
1987	Mera Insaf	Urdu
1988	Yadona Dolei	Pashto

== Awards and nominations ==
Year	Award	Category	Result	Title	Ref.
1986	6th PTV Awards	Best Actress	Nominated	Footpath Ki Ghaas	
