= Saqi (actor) =

Pakistani film and TV actor

- ساقی
- Born: Abdul Latif Baloch; 2 April 1925; Baghdad, Iraq
- Died: 22 December 1986 (aged 61)
- Occupation: Actor
- Years active: 1955 – 1986
- Spouse: Yasmeen Khan
- Children: 6

Abdul Latif Baloch, better known by his screen name Saqi (2 April 1925 – 22 December 1986), was a Pakistani film and television actor. He is known for mostly playing supportive roles in the Lollywood movies. He starred in more than 500 Urdu, Punjabi, Sindhi, and Pashto films.

== Early life and family ==
Saqi was born on 2 April 1925, in Baghdad, Iraq, where his father had been appointed during the First World War and later stayed there for a while as a railway employee. Saqi belonged to a Baloch family settled in Dadu District, Sindh. His mother was a Kurd from Iraq. His brother Abdul Karim Baloch served as a general manager at Pakistan Television (PTV), Karachi Center.

== Career ==
Saqi could speak more than 10 languages and his ability to speak English fluently helped him gain a small role in an international film Bhowani Junction (1956) which was partly shot in Lahore and starred Ava Gardner. His first Urdu film Ilteja was released in 1955. He appeared in a leading role along with Nighat Sultana in the movie Lakhpati (1958). In 1959, he played a role of a snake charmer in the film Nagin. Another important film in his career was the 1967 release Lakhon Mein Aik. He was mostly cast in character and villain roles.

Saqi worked in over 500 Urdu, Punjabi, Sindhi, and Pashto films. He also produced two films, Paapi (1968) and Hum Log (1970), but they couldn't get box office success. He also played significant roles in TV plays like Deewarein, Jungle, and Gardish. He introduced two male playback singers Mujeeb Aalam and Masood Rana to Lollywood films. His last film Dushmani was released in 1990, four years after his death.

== Personal life and death ==
From his first marriage, Saqi had two daughters and four sons. Later, he also married the actress Yasmeen Khan who used to work in Pashto films. Saqi died on 22 December 1986.

Saqi was a close friend of Mustafa Qureshi, who is famous for playing villain in Pakistani films.

== Awards and recognition ==
- Nigar Award for 'Best Supporting Actor' in Lakhon Mein Aik (1967 film).

== Selected filmography ==
- Iltija (1955) (Saqi's debut film in Pakistan)
- Lakhpati (1958)
- Sassi Punnu (1958)
- Raaz (1959)
- Nagin (1959)
- Raat Kay Rahi (1960)
- Clerk (1960)
- Rahguzar (1960)
- Izzat (1960)
- Bombay Wala (1961)
- Zamana Kya Kahega (1961)
- Shaheed (1962)
- Hazar Dastan (1965)
- Aag Ka Darya (1966)
- Lakhon Mein Aik (1967)
- Mera Ghar Meri Jannat (1968)
- Zarqa (1969)
- Afsana (1970)
- Naseeb Apna Apna (1970)
- Mohabbat (1972)
- Angarey (1972)
- Farz (1973)
- Naya Suraj (1977)
- Mutthi Bhar Chawal (1978)
- Seeta Maryam Margaret (1978)
- Permit (1979)
- Behan Bhai (1979)
- Pakeeza (1979)
- Chotay Nawab (1980)
- Aap Ki Khatir (1980)
- Mian Biwi Razi (1982)
- Muqaddar Ka Sikandar (1984)
