= Ali Ejaz =

Pakistani actor

- Born: 21 October 1941; Qila Gujar Singh, Lahore, Punjab, British India
- Died: 18 December 2018 (aged 77); Lahore, Punjab, Pakistan
- Occupations: Actor; Comedian
- Years active: 1967 – 2018
- Awards: Won 2 Nigar Awards; Won the Pride of Performance award by the President of Pakistan in 1993

Ali Ejaz (21 October 1941 – 18 December 2018) was a Pakistani film and television actor known for his film roles in FBI Operation Pakistan (1971), Sona Chandi (1983), and Chor Machaye Shor (1996). He was given the Pride of Performance Award in 1993 by the President of Pakistan.

Ejaz acted in 106 movies during his career over 5 decades (of which 84 films were in Punjabi, 22 in Urdu, and 1 in Pashto) and in numerous TV dramas.

== Early life and career ==
Ali Ejaz was born on 21 October 1941 in Qila Gujar Singh, Lahore, Pakistan. Comedian Munawwar Zareef was his class-fellow at school.

He started his career with theatre in the 1960s. He was introduced to the film world by the film producer/director Shabab Keranvi who had met Ejaz at a bank. He also frequently acted in Pakistani Television Corporation (PTV) plays. While working at PTV, he trained a generation of artistes. His film roles and his pairing with actress Anjuman and actor Nannha were highly popular in Pakistan in the 1980s.

== Social activist ==
In 2015, he launched a social welfare project near Sialkot, Punjab, Pakistan under his non-government organization (NGO), Ali Ejaz Foundation. This project, The Homes for the Welfare of the Old People, planned to build 132 homes within 3 years with donations from the public, industrialists and philanthropists.

== Death ==
Ali Ejaz died on 18 December 2018 in Lahore at the age of 77 due to a cardiac arrest. Ali Ejaz had earlier suffered from paralysis a decade ago. He is survived by his widow and two sons who abandoned him in his last years by shifting the actor in the servant quarter. He was laid to rest at a local graveyard on Multan road Lahore in his fathers's shrine, the same day after his funeral prayer was offered at Ayubia market in Muslim Town, Lahore.

== Filmography ==
- Insaniyat (Pakistan film debut)
- Dilbar Jani (1969)
- Yamla Jatt (1969)
- Sayyan (1970)
- FBI Operation Pakistan (1971) (Alternate name for this film: Tiger Gang)
- Dil Aur Duniya (1971)
- Geo Jatta (1971)
- Sajjan Dushman (1972)
- Nizam (1972)
- Lalla Majnoo (1973)
- Ik Madari (1973)
- Jogi (1975)
- Sultana Daku (1975)
- Wehshi Jatt (1975)
- Hathkari (1975)
- Warrant (1976)
- Aj Diyan Kurrian (1977)
- Dubai Chalo (1979)
- Waaday Ki Zanjeer (1979)
- Aap Se Kya Parda (1979)
- Behan Bhai (1979)
- Sohra Te Jawai (1980)
- Chacha Bhateeja (1981)
- Muftbar (1981)
- Maula Jatt in London (1981)
- Maula Jat Te Nuri Natt (1981)
- Sala Sahib (1981)
- Dostana (1982)
- Mirza Jat (1982)
- Sahib Jee (1983)
- Susral Chalo (1983)
- Samundar Par (1983)
- Sona Chandi (1983)
- Ishq Pecha (1984)
- Muqaddar Ka Sikandar (1984)
- Joora (1986)
- Chor Machaye Shor (1996)
- Dil Sanbhala Na Jaye (1998)

== Popular TV dramas ==
- Lakhon Mein Teen (1966)
- Heer Ranjha (1972)
- Dubai Chalo (1979) – long-play
- Khawaja and Son (1987) – a popular Pakistani television drama series
- Khoji (1990)
- Maskan (1985)
- Sheeda Talli (1990)
- Parosi (1990)
- Shab Daig (1992)
- Ali Baba (1995)
- Asghari Akhbari (2011)

His other television hits include serials like Lakhon Mein Teen with Qavi Khan and Athar Shah Khan and Dubai Chalo.

== Awards and recognition ==
- Pride of Performance Award by the President of Pakistan (1993)
- Nigar Award for Best Comedian (1981)
- Nigar Award for Best Comedian (1984)
