= Iqbal Hassan =

Pakistani film actor (1942–1984)

- اقبال حسن
- Born: 1942; Lahore, British India
- Died: 14 November 1984 (aged 41–42)
- Occupation: Film actor
- Years active: 1965 – 1984

Iqbal Hassan (1942 – 14 November 1984) was a Pakistani film actor who mostly worked in Punjabi movies during the 1970s and the early 1980s. He is best known by his title role in the movie Sher Khan (1981).

== Life and career ==
Hassan was born in 1942 in Lahore, British India.

He started his acting career in 1965 in the film Punjab Da Sher, which starred the villain Mazhar Shah. Later, he played the hero in the movie Sassi Punnu (1968) opposite Naghma. He appeared in approximately 300 films in his 20-year long career, fifty of which he played the sole hero in. The 1981 release Sher Khan was the most important film in Hassan's career in which he played the title role. In 1972, along with Muhammad Ali and Zeba, he co-produced the Urdu movie Badlay Gi Dunya Saathi.

He died in a car accident on 14 November 1984. Fellow actor Aslam Pervaiz was seriously injured in the accident and died at a hospital a week later.

== Selected filmography ==
- Punjab da Sher (1965)
- Yaar Dost (1968)
- Sassi Punnu (1968)
- Nikkay Hundian da Pyar (1969)
- Charda Suraj (1970)
- Jeb Kutra (1973)
- Sher Khan (1981)
