= Qavi Khan =

Pakistani actor (1942–2023)

Muhammad Qavi khan SI PP NI
- محمد قوی خان
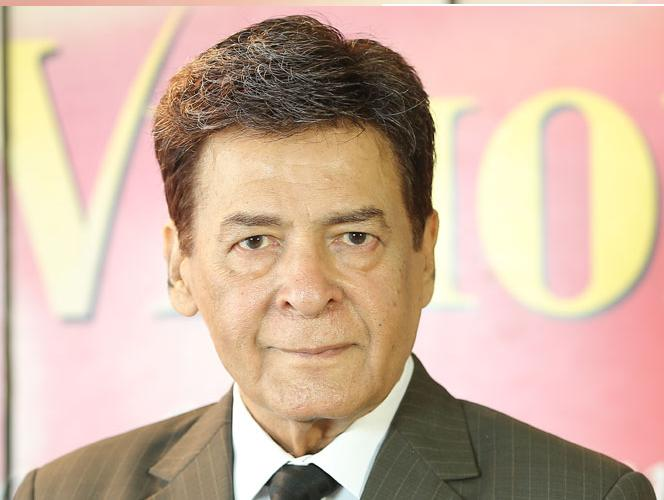
- Born: 13 November 1942; Saharanpur, Uttar Pradesh, British India
- Died: 5 March 2023 (aged 80); Mississauga, Canada
- Occupations: Actor; Director; Playwright
- Years active: 1952–2023
- Spouse: Naheed Qavi
- Children: 4
- Awards: Pride of Performance Award (1980); Sitara-e-Imtiaz (2012); Nishan-e-Imtiaz (2023) (posthumously)

Muhammad Qavi Khan (Urdu: محمد قوی خان; 13 November 1942 – 5 March 2023) was a Pakistani film, radio, theatre and television actor, director, producer and playwright.

Khan acted in over 200 films and some 1,000 television plays.

Khan is best known for his police drama serial Andhera Ujala (1984), which launched him to stardom alongside his fellow actors Irfan Khoosat and Jameel Fakhri. His other starring roles include Durr-e-Shehwar (2012), Alif Allah Aur Insaan and Aangan (both 2017–18), the latter of which earned him Lux Style Award for Best TV Actor (critics' and viewers') nominations at the 18th Lux Style Awards.

In March 2011, Pakistan National Council of the Arts honored his achievements in an event. He was honoured with the Pride of Performance and Sitara-e-Imtiaz in 1980 and 2012 respectively by the government of Pakistan for his contribution to arts.

== Early and personal life ==
Khan was born in an Urdu-speaking family of ancestral Pashtun (Yousufzai) roots to a father who served in the British Indian Army. Following the 1947 Partition of India, the family moved to Pakistan, settling down in Khokropar, Sindh, before moving to Peshawar, where they would live opposite the Mahabat Khan Mosque. Khan would get his early education there and later work as a front desk officer at a Grindlays Bank branch before going to Lahore to pursue his passion for acting more seriously.

He married in 1968 and had four children. His sons Adnan Qavi and Mehran Qavi have also been actors.

== Career ==
=== Radio ===
In 1952, he began his career as a child artist by joining Radio Pakistan Peshawar.

=== Theatre ===
In 1961, he was cast in Dagha Baz, a play written by Envar Sajjad and directed by Kamal Ahmed Rizvi.

=== Television ===
In 1964, he started his television career by playing the lead in PTV's first-ever play, Nazrana, and went on to be part of some 1,000 serials.

In 1966, he appeared in PTV's black-and-white hit drama Lakhon Main Teen (transl. Three in a million) along with Ali Ejaz and Athar Shah Khan Jaidi.

In 2021, he played Muhammad Boota, a Punjabi authoritative older man who has a legacy in the catering business, in Ishq Jalebi, a role written especially for him.

=== Films ===
In 1964, he worked in his first movie, Diljeet Mirza's Riwaj.

In 1971, he started producing films, Mr Buddhu being the first of some 13 film productions, while he would eventually act in over 200 films.

In 1975, he directed Roshni, his only film as director.

=== Literature ===
He was also a playwright, having written the autobiographical one-man stage play Action and Reaction in 2011.

== Death ==
Khan died of cancer on 5 March 2023, at the age of 80 in Canada and was laid to rest at Meadowvale Cemetery, Section 32, Grave No 114, Brampton, Ontario, Canada.

== Selected filmography ==
=== Films ===
Year	Title	Role	Producer	Director	Language
1964	Riwaj				Urdu
1971	Charagh Kahan Roshni Kahan				Urdu
1971	Neend Hamari Khwab Tumhare				Urdu
1971	Tiger Gang	Hassan			English/Urdu
1971	Mr Buddhu		Yes		Urdu
1972	Khalish				Urdu
1972	Suhag				Urdu
1972	Naag Muni				Urdu
1972	Pazeb				Urdu
1972	Mohabbat				Urdu
1972	Meh Jabeenay				Pashto
1973	Mr. Budhu				Urdu
1973	Farz				Urdu
1973	Be-Imaan				Urdu
1973	Aas				Urdu
1974	Intezar				Urdu
1974	Mitti Ke Putlay				Urdu
1974	Manji Kithay Dahwan				Punjabi
1974	Neelaam				Urdu
1975	Mohabbat Zindagi Hai				Urdu
1975	Ajnabi				Urdu
1975	Roshni		Yes	Yes	Urdu
1976	Badtameez	Akhtar			Punjabi
1976	Society Girl				Urdu
1976	Mujhay Galay Laga Lo				Urdu
1977	Aaina				Urdu
1977	Begum Jaan	Amjad			Urdu
1977	Jawani Deevani		Yes		Urdu
1978	Seeta Maryam Margaret	Baqir			Urdu
1979	Chori Chori		Yes		Urdu
1979	Main Chup Rahun Gi				Urdu
1979	Pakeeza				Urdu
1980	Nahin Abhi Nahin				Urdu
1981	Chan Suraj	Shaukat Ali			Punjabi
1982	Pasban				Urdu
1988	Maa Bani Dulhan				Urdu
1989	Sarfarosh				Punjabi
1991	Kalay Chor	Press reporter			Punjabi/Urdu
1994	Zameen Aasman	Farrukh			Punjabi/Urdu
1994	International Luteray	Rahim Sahab			Punjabi/Urdu
1994	Sarkata Insaan				Urdu
2014	Main Kukkoo Aur Woh	Kukkoo			Urdu
2015	Wrong No.	Nawab			Urdu
2017	Mehrunisa V Lub U	Bunty (Ali's grandfather)			Urdu
2018	Pari				Urdu
2020	I'll Meet You There	Baba			Urdu
2021	Tameez Uddin Ki Badtameez Family	Tameez Uddin			Urdu
2022	Quaid-e-Azam Zindabad	Munir Mughal			Urdu
2022	Tich Button	Dada			Urdu

=== Television series ===
Year	Serial	Role	Channel
1966	Lakhon Main Teen		PTV
1981	Dehleez		PTV
1982	Alif Noon		PTV
1983	Dour-e-Junoon	Sami	PTV
1984–1985	Andhera Ujala	DSP Tahir Ali Khan	PTV
1992	Din	Ehsan	PTV
1993	Fareb	Ameer-ud-Deen	PTV
1994	Angar Wadi	Professor Shafee	PTV
1995	Uraan	Nawab Hussain	PTV
1997	Ashiyana	Wajid Khan	PTV
2005	Sussar in Law	Malik Khadim	PTV
2007	Lahori Gate	Nosha	PTV Home
2008	Mutthi Bhar Mitti	Jamal	Hum TV
2008	Chaudhween Ka Chand	Baray Daada	Hum TV
2009	Mannchalay	Khawaja Sahib	Hum TV
2009	Mishaal		PTV
2009	Baityaan		Hum TV
2010	Dastaan	Naseeb Bhai	Hum TV
2011	Meray Qatil Meray Dildar	Umar's father	Hum TV
2011	Phir Chand Pe Dastak		Hum TV
2011	Zindagi Dhoop Tum Ghana Saya	Akbar	ARY Digital
2011	Jo Chale To Jaan Se Guzar Gaye		Geo TV
2012	Durr-e-Shahwar	Mansoor	Hum TV
2012	Meri Behan Meri Dewrani		ARY Digital
2012–2013	Aik Nayee Cinderella	Shah Baba	Geo TV
2013–2014	Kalmoohi		Geo TV
	Dr. Duago		Geo TV
2014	Do Qadam Door Thay	Zohab's Grandfather	Geo TV
2014–2015	Sadqay Tumhare	Molvi	Hum TV
2015	Khatoon Manzil	Abba Jaan	ARY Digital
2015	Ishqaaway		Geo Entertainment
2015	Bojh		Geo TV
2016	Tum Kon Piya	Waqar Ali	Urdu 1
2016	Haya Ke Daaman Main	Azeem	Hum TV
2016	Yeh Ishq		ARY Digital
2016	New York Se New Karachi	Abba Ji	TV One
2016	Saheliyan		ARY Digital
2016	Seeta Bagri		TV One
2017	Munkir	Mursheed Saeen	TV One
2017	Nazr-e-Bad		Hum TV
2017	Alif Allah Aur Insaan	Moulvi	Hum TV
2017	Khaani	Hamid Malik	Geo Entertainment
2017	Aangan	Mian Sahab	ARY Digital
2017	Parchayee		Hum TV
2017-2018	Meraas		Hum TV
2018	Babban Khala Ki Betiyann		ARY Digital
2019	Mujhe Rang De		LTN Family
2019	Darr Khuda Say	Mazhar	Geo TV
2019	Shahrukh Ki Saliyan	Molvi Sahab	Geo TV
2019	Janbaaz	Tahir Khan	Express Entertainment; PTV Home
2020	Zebaish	Molvi Sahab	Hum TV
2020	Prem Gali	Dada Jee	ARY Digital
2020	Mushk	Railway station ghost	Hum TV
2021	Ishq Jalebi	Muhammad Boota or Bau Jee	GEO Entertainment
2021	Chupke Chupke	Bare Abba	Hum TV
2022	Pehchaan	Sharmeen's father	Hum TV
2022	Meri Shehzadi	Sanaullah	Hum TV

== Awards and recognition ==
- 2012 Sitara-e-Imtiaz by the Government of Pakistan
- PTV Award for Best Actor
- Lifetime Achievement Award by PTV in 2007
- 1978 Nigar Award for Best Supporting Actor for Parakh
- Nishan-e-Imtiaz by the President of Pakistan in 2023.
- Lux Style Award for Best TV Actor (Critics' & Viewers') at the 18th Lux Style Awards for Aangan
