= Ehsaan =

1967 Pakistani film

- Directed by: Pervaiz Malik
- Written by: Waheed Murad
- Produced by: Waheed Murad
- Starring: Waheed Murad; Zeba; Nirala; Rozina; Azad; Ibrahim Nafees
- Music by: Sohail Rana
- Distributed by: Film Arts
- Release date: 3 June 1967
- Running time: 180 minutes
- Country: Pakistan
- Language: Urdu

Ehsaan (Urdu: احسان) is a 1967 Pakistani Urdu black & white film produced by Waheed Murad and directed by Pervaiz Malik. The film is a love story, starring Waheed Murad, Zeba, Nirala, Rozina, Azad and Ibrahim Nafees.

== Cast ==
- Zeba
- Waheed Murad
- Rozina
- Nirala
- Ibrahim Nafees
- Azad
- Zahoor Ahmad
- Baby Jugnu
- S.M. Saleem
- Latif Charlie
- Khursheed Kanwar
- Mehmood Ali
- Rafiq Tingu

== Release ==
Ehsaan was released on 3 June 1967 by Film Arts in cinemas of Karachi and Lahore and proved to be one of the popular films of 1967. The film completed 12 weeks on main cinemas and 40 weeks in other cinemas of Karachi and became a 'Silver Jubilee film'. The film had completed 50 weeks and became a 'Golden Jubilee film' in Lahore.

== Plot ==
The story was written by Waheed Murad. It boasts a sensitive script as the psychiatrist Waheed falls in love with and woos young widow (and mother of a young daughter to boot) Zeba, a romance that was decidedly different for its time. Complications obviously arise but the movie remains surprisingly mature and for the most part doesn’t turn into a typical Lollywood melodrama.

== Filming ==
Ehsaan was filmed in Karachi, and during its filming, Zeba got married with Mohammad Ali.

== Music ==
The music and the songs are not as good as in Heera Aur Pathar (1964), Armaan (1966) or Doraha (1967), but there are a couple of popular numbers such as Eik naye more par... and Do akhian.... The music is composed by Sohail Rana and lyrics for the songs written by Masroor Anwar.

=== Discography ===
- Do akhian... by Ahmed Rushdi & Irene Perveen
- Ik naye mor pe lay aaein hain haalaat mujhe.. by Mehdi Hassan
- Ik naye more pe... by Mala
- Aaja ke dil bula raha hai by Ahmed Rushdi
- Aey meri zindagi... by Ahmed Rushdi & Mala
