= List of Pakistani films of 1970 =

A list of films produced in Pakistan in 1970 (see 1970 in film) and in the Urdu language:

== 1970 ==
Title	Director	Cast	Notes
Aakhri Chattan		Rani, Nursallah, Adeeb, Tarana	
Aansoo Ban Gaey Moti	M. A. Rasheed	Shamim Ara, Mohammad Ali, Nasima Khan, Adeeb	
Aashna		Sumbul, Talat Hussain, Nanna, Salim	
Afsana		Deeba, Rozina, Waheed Murad, Nanna	
Anjaan		Zeba, Mohammad Ali, Rukhsana, Allaudin	
Anjuman	Hassan Tariq	Rani, Waheed Murad, Deeba, Sabiha Khanum, Santosh, Lehri	
Baazi		Nadeem, Nisho, Mohammad Ali, Rehan, Qavi	
Bedari		Saloni, Kamal, Lehri, Aaliya	
Bequsoor		Deeba, Mohammad Ali, Masood Akhter, Zeenat	
Bewafa	S. Suleman	Shamim Ara, Waheed Murad, Rehana, Nabila, Mustafa Qureshi	
Chalo Maan Gayai	Rahman	Shabnam, Rahman, Jalil Afghani, Subhash Dutta	East Pakistan
Chand Suraj		Nadeem, Waheed Murad, Shabana, Rozina, Nanna, Sangeeta	
Darinda		Saloni, Sudhir, Rukhsana, Aaliya, Talish	
Diyar-e-Peghamberan (film)			Feature-length documentary
Eik Phool Eik Pathar		Zeeba, Mohammad Ali, Talish, Aamir, Aatiya Ashraf	
Eik Zalim Eik Hasina	Karigar	Azim, Shamim Ara, Sultana Zaman, Mustafa	East Pakistan
Honeymoon		Husna, Kamal, Rozina, Jaffery	
Hum Log		Jugnoo, Waheed Murad, Zeenat, Nasira, Saqi	
Humjoli		Nayyar Sultana, Darpan, Mustafa Quereshi, Saqi	
Insan Aur Aadmi		Zeba, Mohammad Ali, Talat Hussain, Aasia	
Jale Na Kyun Parwana	Shaukat Hashmi	Shabnam, Nadeem, Kamal, Saiqa, Lehri	
Jhuk Gaya Aasman		Tarannum, Modi, K. Irani, Nirala, Tarana	
Kauser		Yasmin, Rukhsana, Habib, Allaudin	
Kirdaar		Akter Aziz, Ghazala, Rozina, Tariq Aziz	
Love in Europe		Rozina, Kamal, Tarana, Ibrahim Nafees	
Love in Jungle		Aaliya, Azim, Adeeb, Nanna	
Maina	Qazi Zaheer	Kabori Sarwar, Razzaq, Anwar Hossain, Siraj	East Pakistan
Mohabat Rang Laigi		Zeba, Mohammad Ali, Lehri, Saqi, Saiqa	
Mr 420 (Pakistani film)		Iqbal Yusuf, Rani, Rozina, Nirala	
Najma		Zeba, Mohammad Ali, Rozina, Aaliya, Tamanna	
Naseeb Apna Apna	Qamar Zaidi	Shabnam, Waheed Murad, Nirala, Saqi	Music by Lal Mohammad Iqbal
Naya Savera	Jamil Akhter	Shabnam, Ejaz Durrani, Zamarrud, Adeeb	
Noreen		Mohammad Ali, Zeba, Ghazala, Lehri, Sabira Sultana	
Paraee Beti		Kamal, Rozina, Tariq Aziz, Tamanna	
Payal	Mustafiz	Shabana, Razzaq, Javed, Anis	East Pakistan
Phir Chand Nikle Ga	Rafiq Rizvi	Deeba, Waheed Murad, Rozina, Nirala	Music by Sohail Rana
Raja Rani		Saloni, Jamal, Aaliya, Zahid, Faisal	
Rangeela	Rangeela	Nisho, Aqeel, Saiqa, Rangeela, Salma Mumtaz, M. Zareef	
Reshman		Saoloni, Sudhir, Asliya, Rangeela, Iqbal	
Road to Swat		Syed Kamal, Nasima Khan, Aasia	
Saughat	Pervez Malik	Rozina, Nadeem, Masood Akhtar, Zamarrud	
Shahi Faqir		Ghazala, Masood Rana, Adeeb, Tarana	
Shama Aur Parwana	Hassan Tariq	Shabnam, Nadeem, Rani, Ejaz Durrani	
Shama Parwana		Nazim, Anila, Ibrahim Nafees, Nirala	
Takht-o-Taj		Saloni, Salim, Talish, Adeeb	
Ye Raste Hain Pyar Ke		Ejaz, Saloni, Habib, Aaliya	

== See also ==
- 1970 in Pakistan
