= Jab Jab Phool Khile (1975 film) =

1975 Pakistani film

Jub Jub Phool Khiley
- Directed by: Iqbal Akhtar
- Written by: Zahida Masroor
- Screenplay by: Masroor Anwar
- Produced by: Riaz Bukhari and Shariq Chaudhry
- Starring: Waheed Murad; Mohammad Ali; Nadeem; Zeba; Mumtaz; Ibrahim Nafees; Aliya Begum; Khalid Saleem Mota; Najma Mehboob
- Music by: M. Ashraf
- Release date: 21 November 1975
- Running time: 180 minutes
- Country: Pakistan
- Language: Urdu

Jub Jub Phool Khiley (transl. Whenever the blossoms bloom) was a Pakistani Urdu-language film, released on 21 November 1975. It starred Zeba, Mumtaz, Waheed Murad, Mohammad Ali and Nadeem.

The film went on to be a super-hit at the cinemas all over Pakistan and completed 50 weeks on the big screen, becoming a golden jubilee film

== Plot ==
In a house like any other, live a lawyer, his wife, their 3 sons (Naeem, Saleem and Nadeem) and their nanny Surayya. During his lifetime, the lawyer has made many enemies including the convicts he has put in jail. On a stormy night, one of those convicts, now a free man, arrives at his doorstep to seek revenge. Although the lawyer does not fear his imminent death, the convict, named Raja Daaku says he will kill off the lawyer's whole family. The lawyer's wife tries to save her husband but gets shot in the process and her husband meets the same fate. The three boys are separated in the confusion. Surayya, the nanny, runs in desperation with the only child she can save, Nadeem, and the other two boys run off by themselves. Naeem manages to board a train but Saleem is not quick enough to board the train and is left behind.

Years later, all three boys have grown up and meet completely different fates, unaware of each other's whereabouts.

Naeem (Mohammad Ali) has been adopted by a wealthy land owner and has become a lawyer and also handles his adoptive father's business. He marries his childhood sweetheart Naila (Zeba). Saleem (Waheed Murad) is caught by Raja Daaku and brought up as a smuggler thief. Nadeem is brought up by their nanny Surayya and grows up to be a dedicated Intelligence Officer. He loves his boisterous neighbor Chandani (Salma Mumtaz).

The story later unfolds as how fate makes the long-lost brothers meet and what is in each of their destinies.

At the end Nadeem baig was a good and lovely actor he helps many poor people in his real life

== Cast ==
- Zeba
- Muhammad Ali
- Nadeem
- Waheed Murad
- Mumtaz
- Ibrahim Nafees
- Najma Mehboob
- Shahnawaz
- Nazli
- Saqi
- Khalid Saleem Mota
- Jameel Bismil
- Master Imran
- Chakram
- Sultana Iqbal
- Aliya Begum
- (Guests: Nayyar Sultana, Darpan, Kemal Irani, Faisal Bukhari)

== Super-hit film songs ==
- "Be-Iman Chahun Tujhay Subah Shaam", Sung by Mehdi Hassan, film song lyrics by Masroor Anwar and music by M Ashraf
- "Kya Pata Zindagi Ka", Sung by Ahmed Rushdi, film song lyrics by Masroor Anwar and music by M Ashraf
