= Armaan (2013 film) =

2013 album

- Directed by: Anjum Shahzad Associate director Wajahatullah Khan
- Written by: Vasay Chaudhry; Fawad Khan
- Based on: Armaan by Waheed Murad
- Produced by: Abdullah Kadwani; 7th Sky Entertainment; Tarang Housefull
- Edited by: Ehtesham Hameed Khan (ET) & Waqas Ali Khan (VIKY)
- Music by: Farrukh Abid & Shoaib Farrukh
- Production company: 7th Sky Entertainment
- Distributed by: Geo Films
- Release date: 13 November 2013
- Running time: 140 minutes
- Country: Pakistan
- Language: Urdu
- Box office: Rs. 1.5 crore (US$54,000)

Armaan (Urdu: ارمان) is a 2013 Pakistani romantic drama film directed by Anjum Shahzad. The film is a remake of the same name released in 1966, starring Waheed Murad and Zeba. The film is produced by Tarang Housefull, Abdullah Kadwani and 7th Sky Entertainment. The remake stars Fawad Khan, Aamina Sheikh, Vasay Chaudhry and Mahnoor Khan. Fawad Khan and Aamina Sheikh won Tarang Housefull Awards for Best On Screen Couple. It is available on Amazon Prime Video.

== Plot ==
The film tells the story of a beautiful but underprivileged girl, Zarnaab, living in Murree with her widowed stepmother and half-sister, Zartaab. A young and flirtatious man, Armaan meets Zarnaab at a friend's Mayoon and is mesmerized by her. Zarnaab pranks him by switching places with a hijra. The encounter of Armaan flirting with the hijra is recorded on the video of the ceremony. An infuriated Armaan orders his manager, Danny, to find out the name and address of the girl who played the prank on him.

The following morning, Armaan's grandfather (and also his only guardian) informs Armaan about his late father's letter asking Armaan to marry his relative's daughter in Murree. Meanwhile, Danny finds out about Zarnaab. Reluctant at first, Armaan agrees to go to Murree when he is told that Zarnaab also lives there.

Not inclined to marry, Armaan informs Danny that they will switch roles in Murree. Armaan strolls off to explore Murree and looks for Zarnaab. Upon hearing the piano playing from a nearby school Armaan follows the sound and discovers that Zarnaab is the one playing it. Panic stricken, Zarnaab calls the security guard and the principal, Zarnaab's stepmother, also arrives. They kick Armaan out of the school premises.

Danny, disguised as Armaan, arrives at the relative's house. Armaan also arrives only to find out that the school's principal is also the relative. Armaan and Danny pose as each other. Danny meets Zartaab, the girl that Armaan is supposed to marry. Zartaab, on the other hand, is in love with Salman and wants to marry him. When she tells her mother about her relationship with Salman, her mother refuses to accept the couple. Meanwhile, Armaan (fake Danny) and Zarnaab fall in love and start spending time with each other. One day Zarnaab and Armaan are sitting near a tree covered with a tattered cloth. Zarnaab tells him the story of how hundreds of years ago there were two lovers who wanted to get married but their families disagreed. So they decided that if they could not live together, they would die together. Before jumping off the cliff they tied the cloth to the tree as a sign of their love. When they jumped, the cloth rips off and pulls them back to safety. Armaan is skeptic and Zarnaab tries to prove him the truthfulness of the story by tying a red cloth to the tree. As she is about to jump off the cliff Armaan pulls her to safety and leaves angrily. She then mumbles that he didn't ask whose name she tied the cloth for, implying that she tied it for Armaan.

Meanwhile, Zartaab meets Salman and tells him that the situation is becoming serious and he should inform his family otherwise, she would have to marry Danny (fake Armaan). Salman dumps her and walks away. After a misunderstanding where Zarnaab unexpectedly finds out that Armaan was only posing as Danny, the couple is able to patch up after Armaan explains everything to Zarnaab.

On the same day Armaan's grandfather arrives in Murree and the truth comes to light. Armaan tells his grandfather that he wants to marry Zarnaab and not Zartaab. On being questioned by her mother about refusing to marry Armaan, Zartaab is forced to confess that she is pregnant with Salman's child. She tries to commit suicide but is saved in time. The doctor informs her mother that it is too late to abort the child and Zartaab herself is unwilling to do so. Her mother then implores Zarnaab to make Zartaab and Armaan's marriage happen. Zarnaab sacrifices her love for the sake of her sister and stepmother. She shows Armaan Zartaab's ultrasound photos and lies to him about the child being her and her lover's. She asks him to leave her alone and marry her sister instead. A shocked and dejected Armaan resigns himself to marrying Zartaab.

On the day of the wedding, Salman goes to Zartaab's bedroom to ask for forgiveness. Angrily, she yells at him for ruining not only her life but also Zarnaab's who was forced to sacrifice her love by lying to Armaan. Armaan overhears the conversation and leaves to find Zarnaab. Armaan rushes to find her trying to commit suicide by jumping off the cliff. He holds her hand to stop her and pulls her back. Before leaving, he takes off the cloth from the tree and throws it away as the lovers reunite.

== Cast ==
- Fawad Khan as Armaan
- Aamina Sheikh as Zarnaab Mirza
- Lubna Aslam as Zartaab's mother.
- Manzoor Qureshi as Armaan's grandfather
- Mahnoor Khan as Zartaab Mirza
- Jahanzaib Khan as Salman
- Vasay Chaudhry as Danny

== Soundtrack ==
Armaan

Soundtrack album by Rahat Fateh Ali Khan, Aamir Zaki, Shaan and Sana Zulfiqar
- Length: 37:45
- Language: Urdu
- Producer: Abdullah Kadwani

Armaan songs are sung by Rahat Fateh Ali Khan, Aamir Zaki, Shreya Ghoshal, Shaan and Sana Zulfiqar.

Track listing
| No. | Title | Singer(s) | Length |
|---|---|---|---|
| 1. | "Ko Ko Korina" | Sana Zulfiqar, Aamir Zaki | 5:32 |
| 2. | "Akelay Na Jaana" | Rahat Fateh Ali Khan, Shreya Ghoshal | 5:23 |
| 3. | "Jab Piyar Main Do Dil" | Shaan | 5:38 |
