= Insaniyat (1967 film) =

1967 film

- Urdu: انسانیت
- Directed by: Shabab Kiranwi
- Written by: Shabab Kiranwi
- Produced by: A. Hameed
- Starring: Waheed Murad; Zeba; Tariq Aziz; Firdous; Nanna; Asha Posley; Ali Ejaz; Hameed Wain; Salma Mumtaz; Sultan Rahi; Tani Begum
- Music by: M Ashraf
- Distributed by: Shabab Productions
- Release date: 24 February 1967
- Running time: approx. 3 hours
- Country: Pakistan
- Language: Urdu

Insaniyat (transl. humanity) is a 1967 Pakistani Urdu language black-and-white film produced by A. Hameed, directed by Shabab Kiranvi who also wrote the screenplay. The film starred Waheed Murad, Zeba, Tariq Aziz, Firdous and Nanna. The film revolves around a doctor, who has to treat the husband of his ex beloved, suffering from cancer.

The film was a remake of the Indian film, Dil Ek Mandir which in turn was the remake of a Tamil film, Nenjil Or Aalayam.

== Cast ==
- Zeba
- Waheed Murad
- Tariq Aziz
- Firdous Begum
- Razia
- Nanha
- Ali Ejaz
- Ali Baba
- Asha Posley
- Tani Begum
- G.N. Butt
- Guests: Sultan Rahi, Salma Mumtaz, Zeenat, Hameed Wain

== Release ==
Insaniyat was released on 24 February 1967 by Shabab Productions in Pakistani cinemas. It was a silver jubilee film, completing 30 weeks in theaters.

In 2017, it was screened by Lok Virsa Museum.

== Plot ==
Insaniyat is a story of a dedicated doctor Ajmal and a faithful love interest Noor Jahan. Ajmal leaves the country for abroad to get a higher degree in medical sciences whereas his beloved Noor Jahan waits for his return. Before his return, Noor Jahan is forcefully married to Jahangir by her parents. On wedding night, it is discovered that Jahangir is a cancer patient. After returning home, Ajmal saves his patient Jahangir's life who was married to his beloved. Firdous played the role of a mad girl, Perveen under medical treatment in Ajmal's clinic.

== Music ==
The music of Insaniyat is composed by M Ashraf and the lyrics are written by the director Shabab Kiranvi, Khawaja Pervez and Nazim Panipati. Playback singers are Ahmed Rushdi, Mala and Irene Parveen.

- Jan-e-bahar, jan-e-tamanna... by Ahmed Rushdi
- Pyar mein sub kuch chalta hai... by Ahmed Rushdi & Irene Parveen
- Mohabbat mein sara jahan jal gaya hai by Mala
- Mere hamdam mere sathi... by Mala
- Ummat ke ghamkhwar... Naat song by Mala
- Hai ri mohabbat... by Mala
- Dil na lagana... by Irene Parveen
