= Hero (1985 film) =

1985 Pakistani action film

- Poster
- Directed by: Iqbal Yousuf
- Written by: Waheed Murad
- Produced by: Waheed Murad
- Starring: Waheed Murad; Babra Sharif; Adil Murad; Mumtaz; Khalid Saleem Mota; Munawar Saeed; Tani Begum
- Distributed by: Film Arts
- Release date: 11 January 1985
- Running time: 180 minutes
- Country: Pakistan
- Language: Urdu

Hero is a 1985 Pakistani action film starring Waheed Murad, Babra Sharif, Mumtaz, Aslam Pervaiz, Saqi, with Nadeem and Murad's son Adil Murad in guest appearances. It was produced by Murad and directed by Iqbal Yousuf. Murad died leaving the film incomplete in 1983, was later completed by Yousuf, and released after two years of Murad's death on 11 January 1985 countrywide.

During that time, Murad was facing challenges and was being offered supporting roles or projects from B-class film directors. So, he decided to produce his own film and chose his close friend Iqbal Yousuf as the director. Murad wrote the script and story himself, and he had high expectations for the film, as he shared his enthusiasm in an interview on Anwar Maqsood's program Silver Jubilee.

== Synopsis ==
Hero is a romantic and action movie. Waheed Murad played double role in this film. It is based on a story of two different persons but with similar faces, one is very innocent and the other is a gangster.

== Cast ==
- Waheed Murad
- Babra Sharif
- Mumtaz
- Adil Murad
- Munawar Saeed
- Tani Begum
- Huma Dar
- Seema
- Saqi
- Khalid Saleem Mota
- Chakram
- Hanif
- Jahangir Mughal
- (Guests: Talish, Lehri, Aslam Parvez, Ilyas Kashmiri, Shahid, Ali Ejaz, Nadeem)

== Release ==
Hero was released on 11 January 1985, i.e., after two years of Waheed Murad's death. The film was released on Lyric Cinema of Karachi and Firdous Cinema of Hyderabad. The film had average success and completed 35 weeks on cinemas with 5 weeks on main cinemas and thus became a Silver Jubilee film.

== Production ==
The development of the film began in 1981, directed by Iqbal Yousuf and starring Waheed Murad, playing double role in the film. It was the seventh and final film appearance of Murad in a double role. Murad took a risk by changing his iconic look for the film, sporting a moustache in the opening scenes and altering his hairstyle. However, Murad's sudden death in 1983 halted the production. The film was later completed using a stand-in and body double for the remaining scenes. Salahuddin Tunio was approached to complete the remaining scenes, but he declined, citing personal reasons and a payment dispute, after which Kaukab Mehdi eventually took on the role, however the details of his involvement are not well-documented, as reported by Dawn.

The film was released posthumously in January 1985, with Salma Murad, Murad's widow, and Yousuf working to complete it.

== Music ==
The music of the film was composed by Kamal Ahmed with Tasleem Fazli and Khwaja Pervaiz as lyricist. Ahmed Rushdi, Noor Jehan, Mehdi Hassan and Mehnaz were the lead singers. The songs are:

Song	Singer	Note(s)
Ban Ke Misra Ghazal Ka	Ahmed Rushdi	
Yeh Dunya Pyar Ki	Mehnaz	
Woh Nain Suhagan Hote Hain	Mehnaz	
Mil Gaye Ho Tum	Mehnaz	
Main Tujh Ko Kya Bataoon	Noor Jehan	
Tere Jalwon Ki Dhoop Chhaon Ne	Mehdi Hassan	
