= Mohabbat Zindagi Hai (1975 film) =

- Directed by: Iqbal Akhtar
- Produced by: Begum Riaz
- Starring: Mohammad Ali; Zeba; Waheed Murad; Mumtaz; Lehri; Qavi Khan; Saqi; Nayyar Sultana
- Music by: M Ashraf; Film song lyrics Masroor Anwar
- Release date: 6 June 1975
- Running time: 180 minutes
- Country: Pakistan
- Language: Urdu

Mohabbat Zindagi Hai (Urdu: محبت زندگی ہے) is a 1975 Pakistani Urdu-language film directed by Iqbal Akhtar and produced by Begum Riaz. It is a musical romance film starring Mohammad Ali, Zeba, Waheed Murad, Mumtaz, Nayyar Sultana, Qavi Khan, Saqi and Lehri. Waheed Murad played a secondary role and Zeba played a lead role against Mohammad Ali.

== Cast ==
- Zeba
- Mohammad Ali
- Waheed Murad
- Mumtaz
- Lehri
- Qavi
- Nayyar Sultana
- Saqi
- Zeenat
- Zarqa
- Khalid Saleem Mota
- Mustafa Tind
- Shahnawaz

== Themes ==
A central theme of Mohabbat Zindagi Hai is the tension between Westernized modernity and traditional Pakistani values. The film presents this conflict through the transformation of Mumtaz’s character from an independent, socially active young woman into someone who embraces conventional cultural and moral ideals when her England-returned fiancé makes her realise the folloes of that culture.

== Release ==
Mohabbat Zindagi Hai was released by Ayaz Films on 6 June 1975 in Pakistani cinemas. The film completed 12 weeks on main cinemas and 59 weeks on other cinemas in Karachi and, thus, became a Golden Jubilee film.

== Music ==
The music of the film is composed by M Ashraf and the songs are written by Masroor Anwar. Playback singers are Ahmed Rushdi, Mehdi Hassan and Nahid Akhtar. One song of the film became very popular especially Dil ko jalana hum ne chorr diya....

- Dil ko jalana hum ne chorr diya, chorr diya... by Ahmed Rushdi
- Mashriqi rang ko chorr kar... by Ahmed Rushdi
- Main shair to nahin, ghazal kehne ko jee chahata hai... by Mehdi Hassan
- Turu Turu Tara Tara, Bolay Yeh Dil Ik Tara... by Nahid Akhtar
- Dil Sanbhala Na Jaye... by Naheed Akhtar
- Teri Ankhon Ko Jab Dekha... by Mehdi Hassan
