= Saleem Shehzad =

Pakistani singer

- Born: March 1946 (age 80); Ajmer, British India
- Origin: Lahore
- Genres: Playback singing; semi-classical
- Occupation: Singer
- Instruments: Harmonium; Piano; Sitar; Tabla
- Years active: 1959–1995

Saleem Shehzad (born March 1946) is a Pakistani film, television, and radio singer. He is known for his song, Piyar Ki Yaad Nigahon Mein Sajaye Rakhna, playback vocalized for the Urdu movie Talaash in 1976.

== Early life ==
Shehzad was born in March 1945, in Ajmer, British India, near the shrine of Khwaja Moinuddin Chishti. His family migrated to Karachi, Pakistan after the partition in 1947. His father Azim Prem "Ragi" was a Sufi poet and singer specializing in ghazal and qawwali who wanted his son to be a singer as well. His mother stitched clothes for Noor Jehan. Shehzad got his early music training from Ustad Bade Ghulam Ali Khan who was residing in Lahore and was a friend of his father. Saleem began playing the harmonium in childhood and was largely self-taught through observation and practice. He later learned the piano, sitar, and tabla, and completed a graduate degree at Karachi University.

== Career ==
=== Early years: radio ===
Shehzad's career as a playback singer started with a song sung for the film, Savera, released in 1959. In 1962, he won a film competition that was held to select singers for a movie, Hum Ek Hein in Lahore. His first song, Onchay Onchay Mehalon Mein Dekho, was penned by Fayyaz Hashmi and composed by M. Ali Sharif. In 1964, he was offered a job at Radio Pakistan, Lahore, where he served for the next eighteen years and recorded over 2,000 songs, ghazals, and na'ats. During that time, he continued his training under Ustad Khursheed Ahmed Bode, who had also trained Mohammed Rafi.

=== Peak years: cinema ===
In 1964, the composer Sohail Rana picked Shehzad as a playback vocalist for his film, Heera Aur Pathar. In the film, Shehzad sang a duet, along with Talat Siddiqui, Mujhay Ik Larky Se Piyar Ho Gaya, that became a hit of the time. His other hit song, Mohabbat Ke Diye Jala Lo, came from the movie, Asalam o Alaikum in 1969. In 1976, he recorded a song, Piyar Ki Yaad Nigahon Mein Sajaye Rakhna, for the film Talash, that later became his identity. The melody was later reused in the 1978 Hindi film Kasme Vaade, composed by R. D. Burman, with revised lyrics beginning Pyar Ke Rang Se Tu Dil Ko Sajaye Rakhna. His last movie as a playback singer was Moeen Akhtar's Mr. K2, which was released in 1995. In total, he sung for some 60 films in Pakistan.

=== Later years: television and brief career in India ===
Saleem performed vocals for several patriotic and religious television dramas, including Labbaik, Muhammad Bin Qasim, Tipu Sultan, and Sir Syed Ahmad Khan, all produced by Qasim Jalali. From the 1980s onward, he also made frequent visits to India at the invitation of admirers. In 1982, he recorded the song Peda Kar Ke Bhool Gaya Kyun for the Hindi film Jeevan Dhara, with music composed by Laxmikant–Pyarelal.

He later released approximately ten music albums with an Indian music label, but did not receive royalties for these recordings.

== Personal life ==
Shehzad lives in Karachi and gives music lessons to young singers at his home. He has supported himself by teaching music to children and performing at small, privately arranged events, and stated that he received a monthly government stipend of PKR 5,000, which he described as insufficient for his living expenses. In 2021, he almost lost his eyesight due to a mistreated ocular disease. He has three sons, none involved in music: two work abroad while a son is in the Karachi Police.

== Notable songs ==
Shehzad sang 23 songs for 19 Urdu film:

Song title	Lyrics by	Music by	Film
R.A.T. Rat, Maani Chuha, C.A.T. Cat, Maani Billi..	Nazim Panipati	Manzoor	Savera (1959)
Mujhay Ik Larki Se Piyar Ho Gaya (co-singer: Talat Siddiqui)	Masroor Anwar	Sohail Rana	Heera Aur Pathar (1964)
Rahay Himmat Jawan Apni Sathi Rahay Honto Peh Apnay Tarana	Masroor Anwar	Sohail Rana	Heera Aur Pathar (1964)
Mohabbat Kay Diye Jala Lo, Wafa Kay Geet Gungana Lo	Sohail Iqbal	Nazar-Sabir	Asslam-o-Elaikum (1969)
Zindagi To Aap Ki Raanaion Ka Naam Hay (co-singer: Runa Laila)	Masroor Anwar	Sohail Rana	Saughaat (1970)
Piyar Ki Yaad Nigahon Mein Sajaye Rakhna	Masroor Anwar	Nisar Bazmi	Talaash (1976)
