= Anhoni =

- Directed by: Iqbal Akhter
- Starring: Waheed Murad; Aliya Begum; Lehri; Nimmi
- Music by: Lal Mohammad Iqbal
- Release date: 21 December 1973
- Running time: 137 mins
- Country: Pakistan
- Language: Urdu

Anhoni is a 1973 Pakistani film directed by Iqbal Akhtar, starring Waheed Murad, Aliya Begum and Lehri. It was premiered on 21 December 1973. Lal Mohammad Iqbal composed the music in the voices of Ahmed Rushdi and Runa Laila.

== Cast ==
- Aliya Begum
- Waheed Murad
- Lehri
- Nimmi
- Zarqa
- Seema
- Zahid Khan
- Rashid
- Saajan
- Mehboob Kashmiri
- Hamid
- Jalil Afghani

== Songs ==
- Hai Kahan Woh Kali (Ahmed Rushdi)
- Mein Tujhey Nazar Kya Doon (Ahmed Rushdi)

== Box office ==
Anhoni was a silver jubilee hit, completing 31 weeks in theaters.
