= Ko Ko Korina =

First pop-song of South Asia

Song by Ahmed Rushdi
- Language: Urdu
- Released: 18 March 1966
- Genre: Pop
- Composer: Sohail Rana
- Lyricist: Masroor Anwar

"Ko Ko Korina" (Urdu:کوکوکورینا) is a song which appeared in the 1966 Urdu-language film Armaan and is considered the first pop song of Pakistan, and often of all South Asia. Produced during the Golden Age of Pakistani cinema, the song's lyrics were written by Masroor Anwar and the music composed by Sohail Rana. Ahmed Rushdi was the playback singer, with actor Waheed Murad lip-syncing.

== Background ==
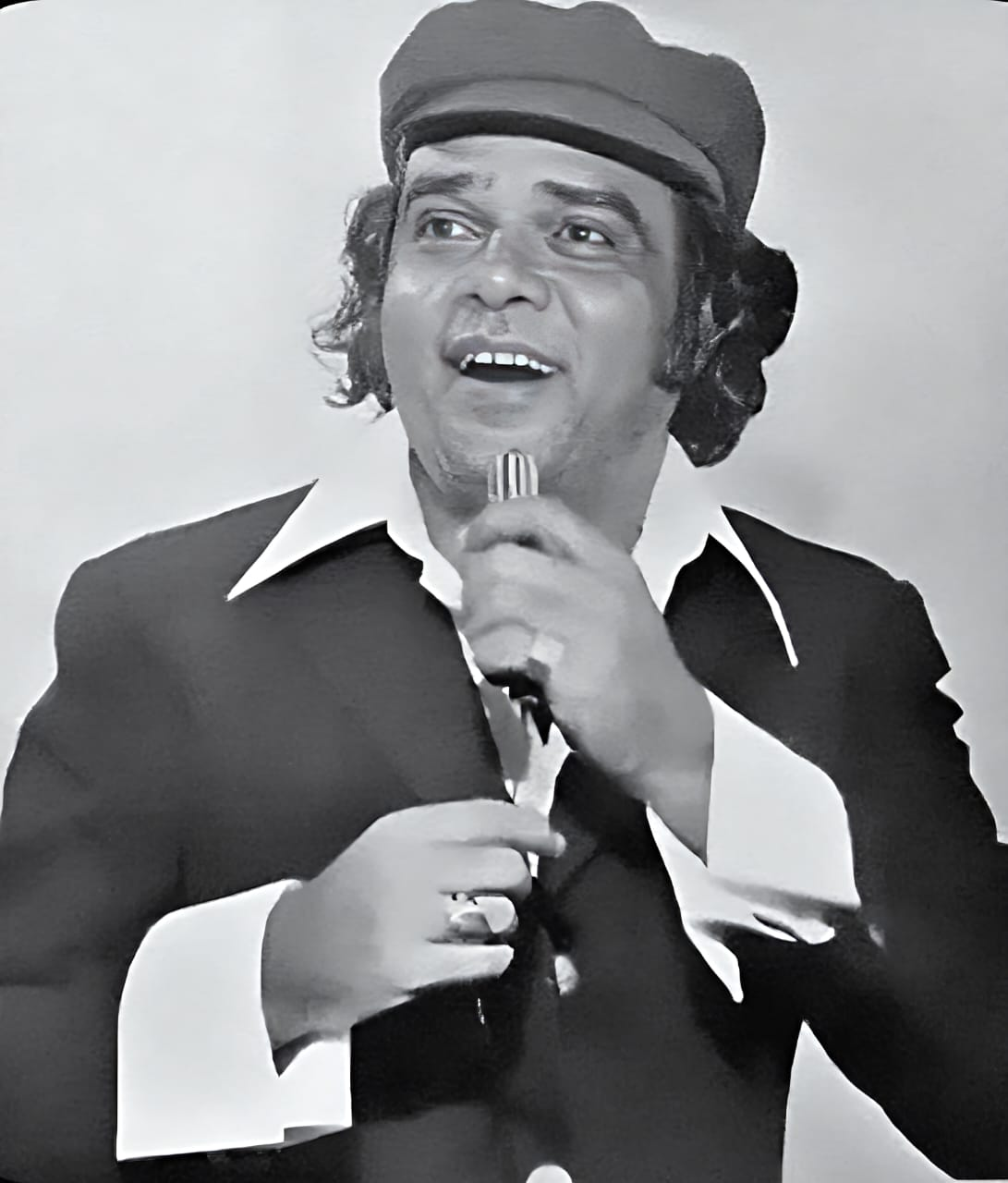
Playback singer Ahmed Rushdi sang Ko Ko Korina

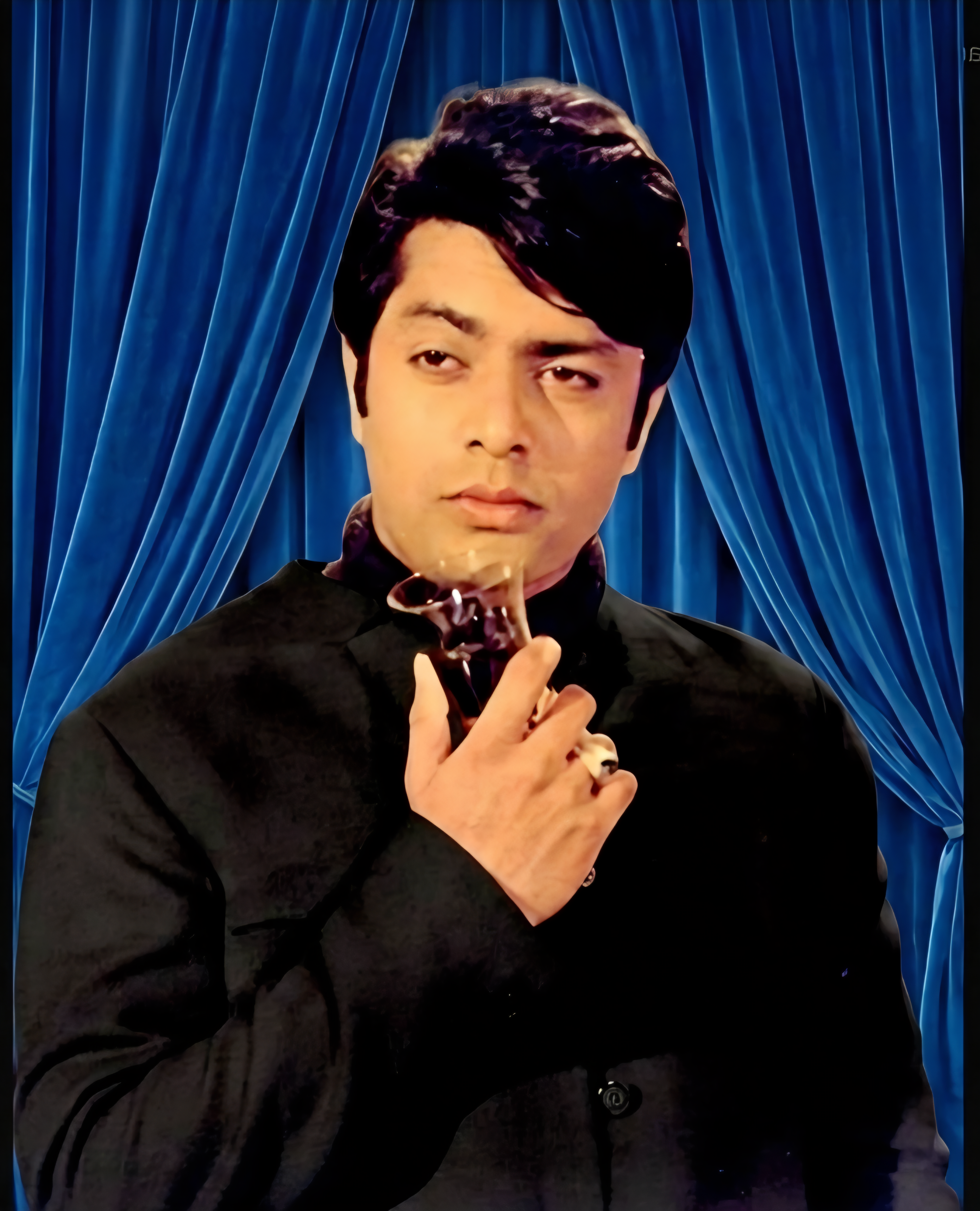
Actor Waheed Murad lip-synced Ko Ko Korina

In 1966, actor-producer Waheed Murad made his film Armaan in which Sohail Rana came up with a pop song "Ko ko Korina" which got a full house success not only all over the country but also all over South Asia. Playback singer Ahmed Rushdi recorded this song. Following Rushdi's success, Christian bands specialising in jazz started performing at various night clubs and hotel lobbies in Karachi, Hyderabad, Mumbai, Dhaka and Lahore.

== Remakes ==
The 2013 Geo TV television film Armaan, featured the song in a new version, with a few English lyrics. The song was sung by Sana Zulfiqar and Aamir Zaki, and was picturized on Fawad Khan, Aamina Sheikh, Jahanzaib Khan and Mahnoor Khan.

In August 2018, Coke Studio produced a remake of "Ko Ko Korina", originally lip-sync by Waheed Murad in the voices of Momina Mustehsan and Ahad Raza Mir. Their rendition of this Pakistani classic was widely criticized. Within a few days of the video being released on YouTube, it became the most-disliked video in the music show's 11-year history; even the then Minister for Human Rights Shireen Mazari called the remake "horrendous". Waheed Murad's son Adil Murad also apologized to the Pakistani nation for allowing Coke Studio a remake of the song. In 2022, Ko Ko Korina featured in the opening scene of American series Ms. Marvel (miniseries) and won top ratings.
