= Kamyabi =

1984 film

- Directed by: Pervez Malik
- Screenplay by: Pervez Malik
- Story by: Pervez Malik
- Produced by: Pervez Malik, Javed A. Chaudhry
- Starring: Nadeem Baig; Shabnam; Talat Hussain; Sabiha Khanum; Master Khurram; Nanha
- Narrated by: Sanaullah Chaudhry
- Cinematography: Riaz Bukhari
- Edited by: Z. A. Zulfi
- Music by: M. Ashraf; Lyrics; Masroor Anwar; Singers; Naheed Akhtar, A. Nayyar, Ghulam Ali
- Production companies: Film Ventures; Shah Films
- Distributed by: A. M. Studio, International Studio
- Release date: 30 June 1984 (Pakistan)
- Running time: 160 minutes
- Countries: Canada; Pakistan
- Language: Urdu

Kamyabi (Urdu: کامیابی) is a 1984 Pakistani, family drama and a musical film – directed, screenplay, produced by Pervez Malik. Film stars actor Shabnam, Nadeem, Sabiha Khanum, Talat Hussain.

== Cast ==
- Nadeem as (Tariq), the film's title role
- Shabnam
- Talat Hussain
- Sabiha Khanum
- Master Khurram
- Nannha
- Anis Qureshi
- Ejaz Akhtar

== Soundtrack ==
The lyrics are penned by Masroor Anwar and the film musical score by M. Ashraf:

Kamyabi

Soundtrack album by M. Ashraf
- Released: 1984
- Recorded: 1984
- Genre: Film soundtrack
- Length: 32:43
- Language: Urdu
- Label: Best Musical
- Director: Pervez Malik
- Producer: Javed A. Chaudhry

M. Ashraf chronology
Insaniyat Kay Dushman (1990)	Kamyabi (1984)	Kalka (1989)

=== Track listing ===
No.	Title	Artist(s)	Length
1.	"Jo Zamane Mein Himmat Na Haaray"	Ghulam Ali	4:30
2.	"Jan-E-Mann Teri Nasihli Ankhun Ka"	A. Nayyar	4:39
3.	"Chalo Chalen Papa Ham Apnay Pakistan Mein"	Naheed Akhtar	4:04
4.	"Kia Main Sunaoon Is Dil Ka Haal Wayi Wayi"	Naheed Akhtar	4:41
5.	"Chand Mulaqaton Mein"	A. Nayyar & Naheed Akhtar	5:44
6.	"Hay Apnay Watan Say Pyar Hamein"	Naheed Akhtar	4:58
7.	"Kamyabi Qadam Choomti Hai"	Ghulam Ali	4:07

== Box office ==
The film was a golden jubilee hit, completing 61 weeks in the theaters.
