= Mohabbat Zindagi Hai =

Mohabbat Zindagi Hai may refer to:

- Mohabbat Zindagi Hai (1966 film), a 1966 Indian Hindi-language romantic film by Jagdish Nirula, starring Dharmendra and Rajshree
- Mohabbat Zindagi Hai (1975 film), a 1975 Pakistani Urdu film
- "Mohabbat Zindagi Hai" (song), a popular song written for the Pakistani film Tum Salamat Raho
