= Clerk (1989 film) =

- Directed by: Manoj Kumar
- Written by: Manoj Kumar
- Produced by: Manoj Kumar
- Starring: Ashok Kumar; Rajendra Kumar; Manoj Kumar; Shashi Kapoor; Rekha; Anita Raj; Sonu Walia; Mohamed Ali; Zeba
- Cinematography: Joe D Souza
- Edited by: Manoj Kumar
- Music by: Uttam Jagadish
- Release date: 7 April 1989
- Running time: 165 minutes
- Country: India
- Language: Hindi

Clerk is a 1989 Indian Hindi-language action thriller film written, produced and directed by Manoj Kumar and starring Manoj Kumar alongside an ensemble cast including Rekha, Anita Raj, Shashi Kapoor, Rajendra Kumar, Ashok Kumar, Prem Chopra, Sonu Walia, Rajiv Goswami, along with Pakistani actors Mohammed Ali & Zeba in their only Hindi film appearance. It was the last film Manoj Kumar directed that had him in the leading role.

== Plot synopsis ==
The film is a story of an honest clerk, Bharat (Manoj Kumar), who along with his family faces immense difficulties owing to their poverty. The plot revolves around the circumstances which force him to become corrupt. In the end, he repents and becomes honest again — while also saving his nation from anti-nationals.

== Cast ==
- Ashok Kumar as Satyapati
- Rajendra Kumar as Rahim Khan
- Manoj Kumar as Bharat
- Shashi Kapoor as Vijay Kapoor
- Rekha as Sneha
- Anita Raj as Pooja
- Sonu Walia as Sonu
- Rajiv Goswami as Balram
- Prem Chopra as Sadhuram
- Om Shivpuri as General Jindal
- Mohammad Ali as Ram
- Zeba as Rukmini
- Dina Pathak as Bharat's mother
- Sonika Gill as Tulsi
- Rajendranath as S. P. Lal
- Birbal as Kuljeet
- Anoop Kumar as Head Clerk Mukherjee

== Music ==
The music was composed by Jagdish Khanna, Uttam Singh and Uttam Ghosh. The music was released under T-Series.

1. "Jhoom Jhoom Kar Gaao Re, Aaj Pandrah August Hai" — Mahendra Kapoor, Lata Mangeshkar
2. "Mai Ek Clerk Hu" — Mahendra Kapoor
3. "Neelaam Ghar Me Humne" — Lata Mangeshkar
4. "Rakh Geeta Pe Haath" — Nitin Mukesh, Lata Mangeshkar
5. "Kadam Kadam" — Mahendra Kapoor
6. "Tumse Jo Baat Hui" — Bhupinder Singh
7. "Tun Tun Tun Tun Tun" — Lata Mangeshkar
