= Mujeeb Alam =

Pakistani film singer

Mujeeb Aalam
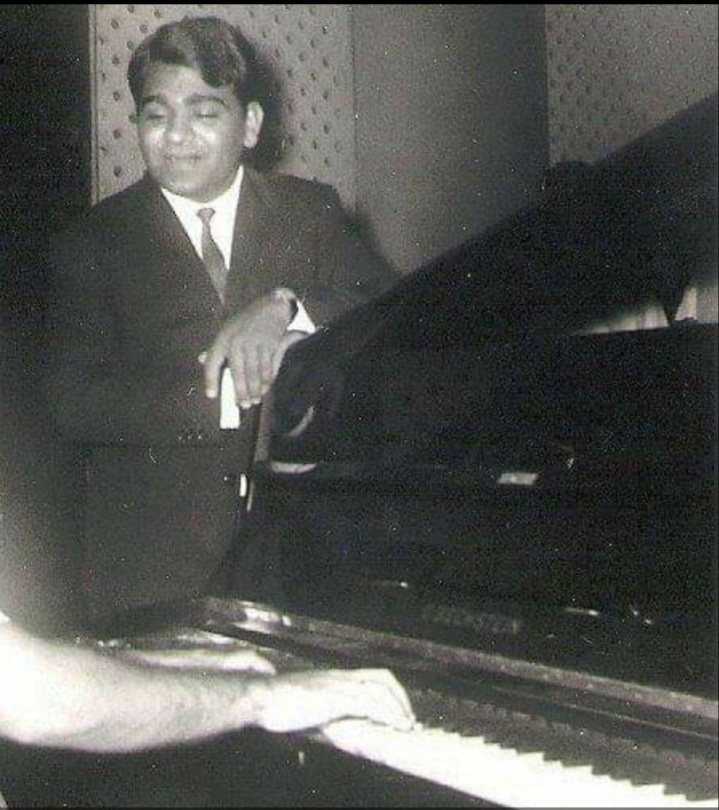
- Alam in 1966

Background information
- Born: 2 September 1948; Kanpur, India
- Died: 2 June 2004 (aged 55) Karachi, Pakistan
- Genres: Playback singing, ghazal
- Occupation: Playback Singer
- Instrument: Vocalist
- Years active: 1964–2004

Mujeeb Aalam (2 September 1948 – 2 June 2004) was a Pakistani playback singer who had a short film career. His singing style was a mixture of Mehdi Hassan and Ahmad Rushdi's styles. He sang dozens of hit songs in the late 1960s. However, he lost his popularity in the mid-1970s as more versatile singers like Akhlaq Ahmed and A. Nayyar entered Pakistan film industry.

== Early life and career ==
Mujeeb Alam was born in 1948 in the city of Kanpur and then settled with his parents in Lahore. He started his career at the age of 14 from Radio Pakistan, Lahore. Musician Hassan Latif gave him the chance to sing in his film Nargis, but the film didn't release. However, in 1966, he recorded songs for the film Jalwa and in 1967, a song from Chakori, Woh mere samney, became popular.

He got recognition in the mid-1960s and became one of the prominent playback singers in the industry. He sang over 12,000 songs and won a number of awards. He also performed at hundreds of musical concerts in Pakistan and abroad.

Alam’s songs were picturised on film artists like Nadeem, Waheed Murad, and Mohammad Ali. In early 1980s, when Ahmed Rushdi could no longer perform vocally due to his ailing health, Alam was selected to record songs composed by Rushdi himself. Those recordings were later compiled and released digitally as the album ''Mujeeb sings for Rushdi''.

== Death ==
Mujeeb Aalam retired from films in 1979. He used to participate in private shows and musical programmes which were broadcast from Pakistani television and other TV channels. Mujeeb resided in Block J, North Nazimabad, Karachi, for quite some time.

On Wednesday 2 June 2004, according to his daughter, he left his home at 11:15 pm and as they were about to approach Super Highway when Aalam complained of chest pains and difficulty in breathing. He stopped the car, picked up a bottle of water but fell on the steering wheel. She further said that her father was taken to a private hospital near Sohrab Goth where he was pronounced dead. He was 55 years old.

Aalam's funeral prayers were held on Thursday afternoon at a mosque near his residence in Gulshan-i-Maymar. He was laid to rest at Sakhi Hassan graveyard Karachi where his friend, playback singer Ahmed Rushdi, is also buried.

== Popular songs ==
- "Main teray ajnabi shehr main"
- "Main tera shehr chhor jaoon ga" for film Shama Aur Parwana (1970), lyrics by Saifuddin Saif, music by Nisar Bazmi
- "Main khushi se kiyoon na gaoon, mera dil bhi gaa raha hai"
- "Woh naqab rukh ulat kar meray samnay na aain".
- "Woh meray samnay tasweer banay baithay hain" for film Chakori in 1967, music by Robin Ghosh. This was a breakthrough hit song for him that earned him real fame and a Nigar Award in Pakistan.

== Awards and recognition ==
- Nigar Award as 'Best Singer' for film Chakori in 1967.
