= Lal Mohammad Iqbal =

Pakistani film music composer (1930–2013)

Background information
- Born: Lal Mohammad (1933 - 2009) and Buland Iqbal (1930 - 2013); Rajasthan, British India (Lal Mohammad)
- Origin: Pakistani
- Died: Karachi, Pakistan (both of them died in Karachi)
- Genres: Contemporary instrumental
- Occupations: Composers and music directors of films
- Instruments: Flute, Sarangi
- Years active: 1957–1994
- Father: Bundu Khan

Lal Mohammad Iqbal were a Pakistani composer duo, consisting of Lal Mohammad (1933 – 29 September 2009) and Buland Iqbal (1930 – 25 July 2013). They were among the leading musicians of Pakistan film industry belonging to the country's golden era of film songs.

Buland Iqbal composed music at Radio Pakistan with his colleague Lal Mohammad and the duo became known as Lal Mohammad Iqbal. They had joined Radio Pakistan, Karachi within a span of six months in 1950. At first, they together composed 'geets' and 'ghazals' for Radio Pakistan. The duo is primarily remembered for their compositions in the voice of playback singer Ahmed Rushdi.

== Early life and career ==
Buland Iqbal was the son of Ustad Bundu Khan (1880 – 1955), the famous sarangi player of the subcontinent and he was the younger brother of Umrao Bundu Khan, a sarangi player and classical singer. Belonging to a family of classical musicians of Delhi gharana, Buland Iqbal had command over numerous ragas, which he also sang.

Iqbal used to compose music on Radio and then with his mate Lal Mohammad. He started his film career in 1961 with the film Bara Bajey (1962).

They were first given the chance for films by playback singer Ahmed Rushdi as Rushdi introduced them to different film producers.

The duo composed music for at least 40 films and utilized the voices of many playback singers, including three vocalists from India, namely Talat Mahmood, C. H. Atma and Mubarak Begum. Their last film as a music director was Sab Ke Baap which was released in 1994. Lal Mohammad had died earlier on 29 September 2009 whereas over the last two decades, Buland Iqbal devoted his time to teaching classical and ghazal singing. His devotion for music was so intense that till the age of 80, he would come to teach music four to five times in a week driving his motorbike from his residence in Liaquatabad, Karachi to many other parts of the city.

== Death ==
Lal Mohammad and Buland Iqbal were totally forgotten by the Pakistani film industry and spent their last years in anonymity. Buland Iqbal died on 25 July 2013 in Karachi at age 83, whereas Lal Mohammad had died earlier on 29 September 2009.

== Popular compositions of Lal Mohammad Iqbal ==
Film Song	Singers	Song Lyrics By	Film and year
"Gori zara phir se baja payalya peepal ki chhaon main"	Muhammad Ifrahim, Nasima Shaheen	Dukhi Premnagri	film Jaag Utha Insaan (1966)
"Ae ABr-e-Karam Aj Itna Baras Kay Woh Jaa Na Sakein"	Ahmed Rushdi,	Masroor Anwar	film Naseeb Apna Apna (1970)
"Hai Kahan Woh Kali"	Ahmed Rushdi	Fazal Ahmad Karim Fazli	film Anhoni (1973)
"Socha Tha Pyar Na Karein Gey"	Ahmed Rushdi		film Ladla (1969)
"Duniya Kisi Ke Pyar Mein Jannat Se Kam Nahin"	Mehdi Hassan	Dukhi Premnagri	film Jaag Utha Insaan (1966)
"Rah-e-Talab Mein Kon Kisi Ka, Apnay Bhi Beganay Hayn"	Habib Wali Mohammad	Asrar Ahmad (Ibn-e-Safi)	film Dhamaka (1974)
