= Anjuman (1970 film) =

1970 Pakistani film

- Directed by: Hassan Tariq
- Written by: Agha Hassan Imtisal
- Produced by: Safdar Masud
- Starring: Waheed Murad; Rani; Deeba; Santosh Kumar; Sabiha Khanam; Lehri
- Edited by: Al-Hameed
- Music by: Nisar Bazmi
- Production company: Ideal Movies
- Distributed by: Eveready Pictures
- Release date: 31 July 1970
- Running time: approx. 3 hours
- Country: Pakistan
- Language: Urdu

Anjuman is a Pakistani Urdu film released on 31 July 1970, starring Waheed Murad, Rani, Deeba, Santosh Kumar, Sabiha Khanam and Lehri. The film was released during the heyday of Murad and became a milestone in his career. The film was produced by Safdar Masud under the banner Ideal Movies and directed by Hassan Tariq.

The film was released at the worst possible political situation of the country with the India–Pakistan war of 1971 raging in former East Pakistan. Nevertheless, the film became a huge success, with famous tracks by Runa Laila and Ahmed Rushdi.

The film won 8 Nigar Awards in the categories of best film, best director, best screenplay, best musician, best lyricist, best playback female singer, best editor, best art director and best comedian.

== Plot ==
The film depicts a tragic tale centered around Anjuman, a tawaif portrayed, who initially captivates the wealthy Nawab Wajahat Ali, only to later find herself falling for his younger brother, Nawab Asif Ali. Asif, torn between duty and desire, frequents Anjuman's kotha at her request, despite his affection for another woman, Nudrat. Noorulain Zartaj, Nawab Wajahat Ali's wife, beseeches Anjuman to sacrifice her own happiness for Asif's sake. The story culminates tragically as Anjuman, heartbroken and betrayed, sings a sorrowful melody at her lover's wedding before succumbing to poison, dying at his feet.

== Cast ==
- Rani Begum as Anjuman
- Waheed Murad as Asif Ali
- Santosh Kumar as Wajahat Ali
- Sabiha Khanam as Noorulain Zartaj
- Deeba as Nudrat
- Lehri
- Ragini as Maya Devi

== Music ==
The music was directed by Nisar Bazmi. Songs of the film, especially sung by Runa Laila, became a huge success in Pakistan:

- Izhar bhi mushkil hai... by Noor Jehan
- Bhabhi meri bhabhi... by Ahmed Rushdi
- Bhabhi meri bhabhi... (sad) by Ahmed Rushdi
- Aap Dil Ki Anjuman Mein... by Runa Laila
- Dil Dharke Main Tum Se... by Runa Laila
- Yadash bakhair bachpan mein... by Ahmed Rushdi
- Lag rahi hei mujhe... by Ahmed Rushdi
- " Naianwa chalayie baan... by [Noor Jahan]

== Release ==
Anjuman was released on 31 July 1970, at the worst political time of Pakistan, by Babar Pictures. The film ran for continuously 81 weeks at cinemas in Karachi. The film celebrated a Platinum Jubilee and became a huge success for the year 1970.

== Remake ==
It was remade as a television film in 2013 with the same name, which starred Imran Abbas Naqvi, Sara Loren, Alyy Khan, directed by Yasir Nawaz and produced by Tarang Housefull.

== Awards ==
Anjuman won 8 Nigar Awards in the following categories:

Category	Recipient
Best film	Safdar Masud
Best director	Hassan Tariq
Best music	Nisar Bazmi
Best lyrics	Masroor Anwar
Best female playback singer	Runa Laila
Best editing	Al-Hameed
Best art director	Habib Shah
Best comedian	Lehri
