= Heera Aur Pathar =

1964 film

- Directed by: Parvez Malik
- Produced by: Waheed Murad
- Starring: Waheed Murad; Zeba; Nirala; Ibrahim Nafees; Kamal Irani
- Edited by: M. Aqeel Khan
- Music by: Sohail Rana
- Distributed by: Film Arts
- Release date: 12 November 1964
- Running time: approx. 3 hours
- Country: Pakistan
- Language: Urdu

Heera Aur Pathar (transl. Diamond and Stone) is a 1964 Pakistani Urdu language black-and-white film.

It was the first film of Waheed Murad as a lead actor who also produced it. The film was released on 11 December 1964. Murad introduced film director Parvez Malik for the first time to Pakistani cinema, marking his directorial debut. Also he had introduced film editor, M. Aqeel Khan, who would later receive the Nigar Award for his work in the movie. It was a hit film of 1964.

== Cast and crew ==
Waahed Murad and Zeba in a scene

- Waheed Murad
- Zeba
- Nirala
- Ibrahim Nafees
- Kamal Irani

=== Crew ===
- Music: Sohail Rana
- Editing: M. Aqeel Khan
- Camera: Nazir Hussain
- Assistant Camera: Badar Munir

== Music ==
The music of the film was composed by Sohail Rana. Sohail earned plaudits from his fans for the composition of Mujhay tum say mohabbat hai.... Although, he did not earn a Nigar Award for this film. The songs were written by Masroor Anwar and Mauj Lakhnavi. Playback singers are: Khursheed Nurali (Sheerazi) Ahmed Rushdi, Najma Niazi, Khursheed Begum, Saleem Shahzad, Mala, Wasim Farooqui and Talat Siddiqui.

=== Discography ===
- Mujhay tum se mohabbat hai... by Ahmed Rushdi and Najma Niazi
- Gori simti jaye sharam se... by Ahmed Rushdi
- Aaj mujhe kya hua... by Najma Niazi
- Rahey himmat jawan apni... by Khursheed Nurali (Sheerazi) and Saleem Shehzad
- Ja ja rey chanda... by Mala
- Mujhay ek larki se pyar ho gaya... by Saleem Shahzad and Talat Siddiqui
- Aao manaen picnic... by Waseem Farooqui and Khursheed Begum

== Awards ==
Film Heera Aur Pathar won two Nigar awards for the year 1964:

- Waheed Murad won Nigar Award in the Best Actor category
- M. Aqeel Khan won Nigar Award in the Best Film Editor category
