= Parvez Malik =

Pakistani film director (1937 - 2008)

Pervez Malik پرویز ملک
- Born: 1937; Karachi, British India
- Died: 18 November 2008 (aged 70-71); Islamabad, Pakistan
- Occupation: Film director
- Years active: 1964 – 2008
- Awards: 2 Nigar Awards in 1966 and in 1981; Pride of Performance Presidential Award in 1992

Pervez Malik (1937 – 18 November 2008) was a Pakistani film director, who directed Pakistan's first platinum jubilee film, Armaan (1966). He directed more than 20 films, mostly in Urdu language, and received excellent reviews for many of his films from both film critics and the public.

== Early life ==
Pervez Malik was nine years old when Pakistan became independent in 1947. His family had a background in military service, but he was influenced by his classfellow, Waheed Murad, whose father, Nisar Murad, ran a film distribution business, named Film Arts. With the passage of time, they both learned the art of making and marketing films from Nisar Murad and his colleagues who were mostly film-industry personalities. After graduation, both decided to study film-making in the US, but Waheed Murad, an only child, was not allowed by his parents to go to the US for four years. So Pervez Malik went alone while Waheed Murad was admitted to Karachi University to pursue his second highest passion, English Literature. Pervez Malik received his master's degree in film-making from University of Southern California in Los Angeles and returned to Pakistan in 1963.

== Film career ==
After returning, he joined the country's most widely circulated English language magazine, Eastern Film, as assistant editor. During this period, Waheed Murad had already produced his own two films under the banner of his father's Films Art. When Pervez Malik joined him, they made hit films like Heera Aur Pathar, Armaan (1966) and Ehsaan (1967). Pervez Malik won the prestigious Nigar Award for Armaan and Qurbani (1981) as Best Film Director. During his film career, Pervez almost always wrote his own screenplays. Following some differences with Waheed Murad, Pervez Malik decided to start casting other heroes like Nadeem and Mohammad Ali in his films. He then never cast Waheed Murad in his films any more.

== Some popular films as director ==
- Heera Aur Pathar (1964), Starring: Zeba, Waheed Murad
- Armaan (1966) (a Platinum Jubilee film), Starring: Zeba, Waheed Murad
- Ehsaan (1967), Starring: Zeba, Waheed Murad
- Doraha (1967), Starring: Shamim Ara, Waheed Murad
- Anmol (1973), Starring: Shabnam, Shahid
- Pehchan (1975), Starring: Shabnam, Nadeem
- Talaash (1976), Starring: Babra Sharif, Nadeem, Shabnam
- Pakeeza (1979), Starring: Shabnam, Nadeem
- Intikhab (1978) Starring: Shabnam, Mohammad Ali
- Hum Dono (1980), Starring: Shabnam, Nadeem
- Qurbani (1981), Starring: Shabnam, Nadeem
- Kamyabi (1984), Starring: Shabnam, Nadeem
- Hulchal (1985), Starring: Javed Sheikh, Nazan Saatci, Shabana
- Gharibon Ka Baadshah (1988)., Starring: Javed Sheikh, Salma Agha

== Awards and recognition ==
- Pride of Performance Award by the President of Pakistan in 1992
- Nigar Award for Best Director twice for films Armaan (1966) and Qurbani (1981)

== Death and legacy ==
Pervez Malik died on 18 Nov 2008 due to a cardiac arrest having directed over 20 films for the Pakistani film industry. His survivors included two sons Imran and Irfan and a daughter besides his wife.
