= Bandagi =

Bandgi
- Directed by: K. Shankar
- Produced by: M. C. Ramamurthi
- Starring: Vinod Mehra; Sandhya Roy
- Music by: Shankar–Jaikishan
- Release date: 1972
- Country: India
- Language: Hindi

Bandgi is a 1972 Bollywood romance film directed by K. Shankar. The film stars Vinod Mehra and Sandhya Roy in lead roles.

== Cast ==
- Vinod Mehra as Darpan
- Sandhya Roy as Aarti
- Pandari Bai as Sita
- Madan Puri as Jaswant
- Sujit Kumar as Kumar
- Padma Khanna as Lily
- Ramesh Deo as Shankarlal

== Soundtrack ==
All songs were written by Rajendra Krishan.

Song	Singer
"O Mera Yaar Zulf Mein Phool Lagake Chalta Hai"	Kishore Kumar
"Allah Kasam Ek Tum Ho Jis Par Dil Aaya"	Kishore Kumar
"Yeh Tooti Botal Ke Tukde, O Sanam Bewafa"	Kishore Kumar
"Phoolon Ki Taazgi Ho Tum, Shabnam Ki Naazgi Ho Tum"	Kishore Kumar, Asha Bhosle
"Bade Anadi Seedhe Saade, O Sanam Tum Bhole Bhaale"	Asha Bhosle
"Mera Naam Hai Jawaani Mastani"	Asha Bhosle
