= Asian Woman =

UK magazine

- Editor: J Wimal
- Categories: Fashion, Lifestyle
- Frequency: Quarterly
- Founded: 2000
- Company: Jayson Emerald Media Corp. Ltd.
- Country: United Kingdom
- Language: English

Asian Woman is a fashion and lifestyle glossy catering to South-Asian women. The magazine was established in June 2000 and first released in 2001. It was started by Smart Asian Media headed by Sarwar Ahmed and Samina Saeed.

Since 2009 the magazine has branched out into a more diverse mainstream market with non-Asian cover stars including BBC Strictly Come Dancing star Alesha Dixon and UK girl group Sugababes as part of a mission to "bring the beauty and appeal of Asian fashion and culture to a wider audience".

In late 2011 the magazine hit national headlines with its decision to use the stars of The Only Way Is Essex, Jessica Wright, Sam Faiers and Lucy Meck on its Winter 2011 cover. The juxtaposition of what was seen as two opposing cultures fuelled an impassioned racism row. Comments on the official Facebook page branded the covers stars as “not Asian at all… it’s being fake tanned brown asian”, while a Twitter user posted: “well I just couldn't imagine the Asian community being appreciative of what #towie brings to the table". Asian Woman's Editor-in-Chief J Wimal responded to the debate on Twitter: “Rather impressed by the huge and mixed response to the new @AsianWomanMag cover and the impassioned debate that it's sparked... On the one hand a lot of people are appreciating our mission to bring the beauty and appeal of Asian fashion and culture to wider audience. On the other hand it's also unveiling a mass of ignorant opinions that are at best irrelevant, at worst horrifically prejudiced."

Less controversial cover stars include Bollywood superstar Aishwarya Rai, Slumdog Millionaire actress Freida Pinto, and British-Asian singer Jay Sean.

Asian Woman magazine is published by Jayson Emerald Media, which acquired it in 2013. The company's stable of titles include Asian Bride, Asian Fashion, Asian Groom and Asian Home & Style. Asian Woman is the publisher's flagship title and has aided a number of mainstream brands in reaching the South-Asian market, including Harrods, Swarovski, Dior and L'Oréal.
