= Adil Murad =

Pakistani actor

- Born: 13 November 1976 (age 49); Lahore, Punjab, Pakistan
- Occupations: Film actor; Telefilm actor; Telefilm Producer
- Years active: 1985 – present
- Spouse: Marrium Raheem (wife)
- Children: 2
- Parent(s): Waheed Murad (father); Salma Maker (mother)
- Relatives: Nasir Murad (grandfather); Shireen Murad (grandmother); Sadia Murad (sister); Aaliya Murad (sister)

Adil Murad is a Pakistani film producer and actor in films, television serials and telefilms. He is the son of actor Waheed Murad.

== Early life ==
Adil's grandfather, Nisar Murad, was a renowned film distributor from Sialkot in Punjab. The Murads claimed to have Turkish ancestry. One of their ancestors, Murat, was a soldier of Ottoman origin serving in the Mughal army, who settled in Punjab.

== Career ==
In the 1980s, Adil made his debut as a child actor and appeared in his father's film Hero which was released in 1985. The film, which his father also wrote, was a silver jubilee hit at the box office. After this success, he continued to work in more films. He made his acting debut in the Pakistani Urdu colour film Raja Sahib in 1996. Although the film didn't do well at the box office due to weak direction and a poorly developed storyline, his performance received highly positive feedback. Since then, he has been working in telefilms as an actor and as producer. Later, he was cast by Shoaib Mansoor in his telefilm Streets of Karachi, which was based on the life of a couple in Karachi and the ups and downs of the city. In 2016, when the ARY Film Awards announced the Special Recognition Award for Waheed's lifelong contributions to film, Adil received the award on behalf of his father.

== Personal life ==
Adil is married to the tennis player Marrium Raheem. They have two children.

== Filmography ==
=== Actor ===
==== Television series ====
Year	Title	Role	Producer	Network
2009	Buri Aurat	Adeel		Geo TV
2011	Sapnon Ki Oat Main	Mehroz		TV One
2012	Kaash	Azaan		PTV
2012	Meri Ladli	Sajid		ARY Digital
2014	Bhabhi	Faris		ARY Digital
2015	Yeh Pyar Hai	Salman		TV One
2017	Aadat	Sarmad		TV One
2018	Saiyaan Way	Shahvez		TV One
2022	Naqqara-e-Khuda	No	Yes	TV One

==== Telefilms ====
Year	Title	Role
2010	Streets of Karachi	Zakir
2011	Ahsaas	Umair
2012	Dil Kuch Aur Samjha Tha	Faisal

==== Films ====
Year	Film	Role	Language
1985	Hero	Jani	Urdu
1986	Shadi Mere Shohar Ki	Sherry	Urdu
1996	Raja Sahib	Raja	Urdu
2011	Kasak	Shahzeb	Urdu
2013	Aseer-e-Shak	Zahid	Urdu
2017	Chain Aye Na	Murad	Urdu

=== Host ===
Year	Title	Role	Network
2010	Lakhon Ka Such	Himself	A-Plus
2012	Lakhon Ka Such Season 2	Himself	A-Plus
