= Doraha (film) =

1967 film

- Film poster of Doraha
- Directed by: Pervaiz Malik
- Written by: Syed Ahmed Rifat
- Produced by: Sohail Rana; Pervaiz Malik
- Starring: Waheed Murad; Shamim Ara; Deeba; Talish; Ibrahim Nafees; Nirala; Talat Siddiqui
- Music by: Sohail Rana
- Production company: United Talents
- Release date: 25 August 1967
- Running time: 180 minutes
- Country: Pakistan
- Language: Urdu

Doraha (Urdu: دوراہا, lit. 'Crossroads') is a 1967 Pakistani musical romance film written by Syed Ahmed Rifat and directed by Pervaiz Malik. It starred Waheed Murad and Shamim Ara, with Deeba, Talish and Ibrahim Nafees in the supporting cast. The film became remarkable due to its music, which was composed by Sohail Rana. It was co-produced by Malik and Rana under the banner United Talents.

At the box office, the film failed to become a big hit, as it was expected, but it gained more importance after several years, especially during the 1980s and 1990s due to its music and songs.

== Plot ==
The story begins with a young, educated singer, Nadeem, who wants to establish himself in the music industry. Upon receiving a letter from his friend Nasir, Nadeem comes to Murree from Karachi, where he meets Naheed, the daughter of his former teacher Amjad. After initial comedic misunderstandings, Nadeem and Naheed fall in love and make promises to each other. Meanwhile, a local girl, Shano, also develops feelings for Nadeem.

Nadeem returns to Karachi for a recording, and Naheed also moves back with her father. Nadeem sends his mother to propose to Naheed's family, but Amjad insults Nadeem's singing career and rejects the proposal. Nadeem's mother dies of grief, and he returns to Murree to stay with Nasir. Amjad arranges Naheed's marriage to Asif, an engineer.

Nadeem meets Shano again, who tries to console him, but he rejects her advances. Asif's company starts a construction project, and Nadeem gets a job there, unaware that Asif is Naheed's husband. Asif recognizes Nadeem's talent and promotes him. When Asif forces Nadeem to sing at his wedding anniversary, Nadeem is shocked to see Naheed as Asif's wife. Naheed insults Nadeem and asks him to leave.

Later, Nadeem saves Asif from an assassination attempt and becomes blind due to injuries. Naheed visits Asif in the hospital and discovers Nadeem's identity. Overcome with regret, she asks Shano to take care of Nadeem. Shano, who has been loving Nadeem, becomes possessive and jealous, but Nadeem eventually accepts her care. Eventually, Nadeem, Shano, and their friends return to the city, with Nadeem coming to terms with his new life with Shano.

== Cast ==
- Waheed Murad as Nadeem
- Shamim Ara as Naheed
- Deeba as Shano
- Ibrahim Nafees as Asif
- Talish as Amjad
- Nirala as Nasir
- Talat Siddiqui as Nadeem's mother
- Qurban Jilani as Arshad

== Production ==
The songs of the film were recorded in Lahore while the film was mainly shot in Karachi's Eastern Studios.

== Release ==
The film was released by United Talents on 25 August 1967 on cinemas of Karachi and Lahore. During the same year, Doraha got tough competition from other successful films like Chakori, Lakhon Mein Aik, Darshan and Aag.

== Music ==
The music of the film is composed by Sohail Rana. The songs of Doraha, particularly, Bhooli hui hoon daastan ... , Mujhe tum nazar se gira tau rahe ho ... Haan isi more par ... Tumhein kaise bata doon ... and Ajnabi zara souch lo ... became very popular on the Radio at that time. The evergreen songs of the film were written by Masroor Anwar and mostly sung by Ahmed Rushdi and Mala. Only one song was recorded in Mehdi Hassan's voice. Waheed Murad declared Rushdi's song, "Bhooli hui hoon daastan", his favorite song. The film Doraha proved to be a milestone in Ahmed Rushdi's career.

=== Track listing ===
- Tumhen Kaise Bata Doon by Ahmed Rushdi
- Bhooli Hui Hoon Daastan by Ahmed Rushdi
- Bhooli Hui Hoon Daastan by Ahmed Rushdi and Mala
- Mujhe Tum Nazar Se Gira Tau Rahe Ho by Mehdi Hassan
- Haan Isi Mor Par by Ahmed Rushdi
- Ajnabi Zara Souch Lo by Ahmed Rushdi
- Koi Mere Dil Mein by Mala
- Wafaaon Ka Badla by Mala
- Ae Chand Zara Ruk Jaana by Mala

The ghazal Mujhe Tum Nazar Se Gira Tau Rahe Ho was later covered by many singers including Ali Zafar.
