= Zeba (actress) =

Pakistani actress

Zeba HI
- زیبا
- Born: Shaheen Bano; 10 September 1945 (age 81); Ambala, Punjab, British India
- Occupations: Actress, Producer
- Years active: 1962 – 1989
- Known for: Taubah (1964 film); Aisa Bhi Hota Hai (1965); Armaan (1966 film) (1966); Insaan Aur Aadmi (1970); Mohabbat (1972 film)
- Spouses: Khawaja Rehmat Ali (1959 – 1962); Sudhir (1964 – 1966); Mohammad Ali (1967 – 2006)
- Children: Samina Ali
- Awards: 1 Best Supporting Actress Nigar Awards; 3 Best Actress Nigar Awards during her career; 2 Special Nigar Awards
- Honours: Hilal-e-Imtiaz (Crescent of Excellence) Award by the President of Pakistan (2016)

Shaheen Bano (born 10 September 1945), known professionally as Zeba (Urdu: زیبا), is a Pakistani former actress. She was one of the top stars of the Pakistani film industry in the 1960s and the early 1970s.

She was voted among 25 of the greatest actors of Asia in a 2010 CNN poll.

During a career that spanned almost three decades, Zeba appeared in numerous commercially successful as well as critically appreciated films, many of which featured her alongside actor and husband Mohammad Ali. She also starred in the 1966 film Arman, which became Pakistan's first platinum jubilee film, and was produced by actor and producer Waheed Murad.

== Early life ==
Born as Shaheen Bano in Ambala, British India on 10 September 1945, Zeba's family migrated to Pakistan from India when she was only 3 years old. She received her basic education in Pakistan. She made her screen debut in film Chiragh Jalta Raha in 1962.

== Career ==
In 1961, producer Noor Mohammad Khan cast her as the heroine in his film Zindagi but later, for unknown reasons, the film was shelved. By then, she accepted a role in another film initially named Shakir. Arif was the hero, and the movie was eventually released in 1962 with a different name Chiragh Jalta Raha and won her the Nigar Award for best supporting actress. Other debut cast were Mohammad Ali and Kamal Irani. Her second release of 1962, Jab say dekha hai tumhain, opposite Darpan earned her critical success. Her next film, Baaji was released in 1963 which was also successful.

Her first release of 1964, Taubah, was a golden jubilee movie. Her pair, first with Kamal and then with Waheed Murad, who was the only producer at that time from Karachi. Her second collaboration with Waheed Murad was the 1964 film Heera aur pathar. Her next three releases in 1964 were Aashiana, Baghi Sipahi and Head Constable.

After the introduction of color movies, she first appeared in Najma. Rishtah hey pyar ka was her first film which was shot overseas. Her first release of 1966 was Armaan which was also Pakistan's first platinum jubilee Urdu film. Armaan was produced by Waheed Murad himself and directed by Pervaiz Malik. The movie was released on 18 March 1966. She won her first Nigar Award in the Best Actress category for this film. During the same year, Zeba and Waheed Murad were teamed up in two other movies, i.e., Josh and Jaag utha insaan. From 1965 to 1969 Zeba worked in a number of films. Some of her notable and successful films of that time are Eid Mubarak (1964), Kaneez, Dard-e-Dil, Koh-e-Noor, Josh, Suhagan, Taj Mahal, Anjaan, Mohabbat rang laye gi, Ek Phool ek Pathar and Bahoo Rani. In 1970, she played a young-to-old role in Shabab Kiranvi's film Insaan aur Aadmi. Her performance was greatly appreciated and she won her second Nigar Award for Best Actress.

One of her most memorable roles came in the 1972 film Mohabbat which was a critical and commercial success and earned Zeba her the third Best Actress award from Nigar Awards.

She starred in only one Punjabi film named Mehndi wale hath, even though she had worked with a total of 45 film directors over her entire career.

She along with Mohammad Ali also worked in 1989 Hindi movie Clerk, which was written, produced, directed by and starring Manoj Kumar alongside an ensemble cast including Rekha, Anita Raj, Shashi Kapoor, Rajendra Kumar, Ashok Kumar, Prem Chopra and Sonu Walia. This was her only Hindi film appearance.

Zeba reportedly told a major newspaper of Pakistan in 2021, "I'm not complete without Ali. He was a good husband, a great father and a good friend."

=== Films with Mohammad Ali ===
By the late 1970s, Zeba started to work opposite her husband only. Known in the media by the portmanteau 'Ali-Zeb', the celebrity couple did a number of movies together. Some of their most notable films are:

- Chiragh Jalta Raha (1962) – This was the debut movie for both of them.
- Aag (1967)
- Jaise Jante Naheen (1969)
- Baharein Phir Bhi Aaeingee
- Dil Diya Dard Liya (1968)
- Najma
- Afsana Zindagi Ka (1972)
- Mohabbat (1972 film)
- Aurat Ek Paheli
- Naukar
- Mohabbat Zindagi Hai
- Jab Jab Phool Khile (1975)
- Phool Mere Gulshan Ka
- Daman Aur Chingari (1973)

Her last film Mohabbat Ho Tau Aesi, released in 1989, was also with Mohammad Ali.

== Personal life ==
Her first marriage was to Khawaja Rehmat Ali (1959–1962), and her second to film actor Sudhir (1964–1966). Although Zeba had met Mohammad Ali on the set of their debut film Chiragh Jalta Raha (1962), their affection for each other was rekindled on the set of the film Tum Mile Pyar Mila (1966), and they married on 29 September 1966, while the film was still under production. The couple described it as a love marriage, and they remained married until Ali's death from a heart attack on 19 March 2006.

Zeba had a daughter from her first marriage named Samina; after marrying Zeba, Ali legally adopted Samina, giving her the name Samina Ali.

== Awards and recognition ==
- Hilal-i-Imtiaz (Crescent of Excellence) Award in 2016 by the President of Pakistan

She received the Nigar Awards four times in her film acting career:

- Nigar Award for Best Supporting Actress in film Chiragh Jalta Raha in 1962
- Nigar Award for Best Actress in film Armaan in 1966
- Nigar Award for Best Actress in film Insaan Aur Aadmi in 1970
- Nigar Award for Best Actress in film Mohabbat in 1972

She also received two special awards from Nigar Awards [Millennium award in 1999] and [Ilyas Rashidi gold medal in 2002].

== Filmography ==
1962

- Chiragh Jalta Raha
- Jab se dekha hai tumhen

1963

- Baaji
- Dil ne tujhe maan liya
- Sumeera
- Mehndi wale hath (Punjabi)

1964

- Taubah
- Ashiana
- Heera aur pathar
- Head constable
- Baghi Sipahi

1965

- Kaneez
- Eid Mubarak
- Aisa bhi hota hai
- Rawaaj
- Tere shehar mein

1966

- Armaan
- Josh
- Koh-e-Noor
- Lori
- Tasveer
- Jokar
- Dard-e-Dil
- Jaag utha Insaan

1967

- Insaniyat
- Ehsaan
- Rishta hai pyar ka
- Maa Baap
- Aag
- Suhagan
- Waqt ki pukar

1968

- Mafroor
- Baalam
- Adalat
- Pakeeza
- Asmat
- Mujhe jeeney do
- Mahal
- Dil diya dard liya
- Taj Mahal (1968 film)

1969

- Tum mile pyar mila
- Jaise jante nahin
- Zindgi kitni haseen hai
- Bahu Rani
- Jang-e-Azadi

1970

- Insaan Aur Aadmi
- Mohabbat rang laye gi
- Ik Phool ik Pathar
- Anjaan
- Najma
- Noreen

1971

- Insaaf Aur Qanoon
- Duniya na maney
- Yaden
- Teri soorat meri Ankhen
- Salam-e-Mohabbat
- Aansoo bahaye Pathron ne

1972

- Afsana Zindgi ka
- Ilzaam
- Sabbaq
- Mohabbat
- Badley gi Duniya saathi
- Dil ik Aaina

1973

- Daman Aur Chingari
- Nadiya ke paar

1974

- Phool Mere Gulshan Ka
- Tiger Gang
- Shama
- Parchhaen

1975

- Jab Jab Phool Khile (Pakistani film)
- Noukar
- Bin Baadal Barsat
- Aarzoo
- Mohabbat Zindagi Hai
- Sheerin Farhad
- Gumrah
- Palki
- Isar

1976

- Aurat ek paheli
- Phool aur Sholay
- Goonj uthi Shehnai
- Dharkan
- Aap ka Khadam

1977

- Bharosa

1978

- Kora Kaghaz
- Takrao

1979

- Chori Chori
- Ibadat

1989

- Clerk
- Mohabbat ho to aisi

== See also ==
- List of Lollywood actors
