= Ahmed Rushdi =

Pakistani playback singer (1934–1983)

Ahmed Rushdi احمد رشدی; SI PP

Background information
- Also known as: Magician of Voice (Urdu: آواز کا جادوگر); Master of Stage (Urdu: اسٹیج کا استاد); Rushdi Sahab (Urdu: رُشدی صاحب)
- Born: Syed Ahmed Rushdi; 24 April 1934; Hyderabad Deccan
- Origin: Pakistan
- Died: 11 April 1983 (aged 48) Karachi, Pakistan
- Genres: Classical music; pop; ghazal; disco; hip-hop; rock and roll
- Occupations: Urdu and regional playback singer
- Instrument: Vocalist
- Years active: 1951–1983

Ahmed Rushdi (Urdu: احمد رشدی; 24 April 1934 – 11 April 1983) was a versatile Pakistani playback singer and "an important contributor to the golden age of Pakistani film music". Known as the Magician of voice, he is widely regarded as one of the greatest singers in South Asia who could sing high tenor notes with ease. He is best known for his versatility and distinctive voice, with complex and dark emotional expressions. His ability to modulate his voice to match the specific screen persona and style of an actor was a hallmark of his career. Rushdi could sing romantic ballads, pop, ghazal, disco, rock and roll, hip-hop, classical, qawwali-style, patriotic and comedic numbers with equal skill. Considered the first pop singer of South Asia, he sang South Asia's first pop song, "Ko Ko Korina", in the 1966 film Armaan.

Born in Hyderabad Deccan, he migrated to Pakistan following partition. In 1954, he recorded the official National Anthem of Pakistan with several other singers. Rushdi has recorded the highest number of film songs in the history of Pakistani cinema in Urdu, English, Punjabi, Bengali, Sindhi, and Gujarati and found unprecedented success as a playback artist from the mid-1950s to the early 1980s. He was also known for his stage performances. He suffered from poor health during the latter part of his life and died of a heart attack at the relatively young age of 48, after recording approximately 5,000 film songs for 583 released films. Besides popular music, Rushdi also helped popularize the ghazals of Naseer Turabi. He was awarded five Nigar Awards, the "Best Singer of the Millennium" title, "Life Time Achievement Award", "Legend Award" and Lux Style Award.

In 2003, 20 years after his death, Pakistani president Pervez Musharraf awarded him the Sitara-i-Imtiaz, the "star of excellence", for distinguished merit in the field of arts. In a 2016 survey by Asian Woman magazine, Rushdi was declared a darling singer of all time. In 2022, his song "Ko Ko Korina" featured in the opening scene of the American television miniseries Ms. Marvel and won top ratings.

== Early life ==
Ahmed Rushdi was born to a religious, conservative family of Hyderabad Deccan in 1934. His father, Syed Manzoor Mohammad, taught Arabic, Islamic history and Persian at Aurangabad College, Hyderabad, Deccan. He died when Rushdi was only six years old. From a young age, Rushdi was fond of listening to the musical programs, including songs, which were broadcast from the radio. He neither inherited music from anyone, nor was anybody in his family ever affiliated with music. Ahmed Rushdi's singing talents impressed a very close friend of his father, whom he called uncle and who loved him dearly. He enrolled in a local music academy in Hyderabad, Deccan. Moreover, two popular composers of the time, M. A. Rauf and Iqbal Qureshi, also taught music in the same school. Thus, Ahmed Rushdi learnt the basics of music from the afore-mentioned teachers. Later, he got some training in classical music from Ustad Nathu Khan.

Ahmed Rushdi did not get any sort of formal training of classical music either before or after becoming a successful playback singer, but he had effective command over high and low notes. He sang his first song in the Indian film Ibrat in 1951 and got recognition. His family moved to Pakistan and settled in Karachi in 1954, where he began participating in variety shows, music programs, and children's programs on radio. In 1954, he recorded his first non-film song, "Bunder Road se Keemari," written by Mehdi Zaheer for the popular Radio Pakistan show Bachchon Ki Duniya; the song was a hit and became the stepping stone for Rushdi's future.

== Singing career ==
=== 1950s and 1960s ===
After the success of "Bunder Road se Keemari," Rushdi was offered songs as a playback singer for films and quickly gained popularity. He lent his voice to many hit films like Bara Admi (1956), Wah Rey Zamaney (1957), Raat Ke Rahi (1957), Yeh Dunya (1958), and many more. Rushdi got good recognition for singing "Mari lela ne aisi" in Anokhi (1956), "Chalak Rahi Hain Mastiyan", and "Chal Na Sakey Gi 420" in Raaz (1959). In 1961, he sang the popular song "Chand Sa Mukhra Gora Badan" in the film Saperan, for which he received his first Nigar Award as Best Male Playback Singer. He further strengthened his status as one of the top male playback singers in Mehtaab (1962), in which he sang "Gol Gappay Wala Aaya" for actor Alauddin; they would again be teamed in Susral. In 1966, he sang "Ko Ko Korina,"considered the first modern Pakistani pop song.

The film Anchal (1960) was an important film in Rushdi's career. Music director Khalil Ahmed recorded an extremely sad number, "Kisi chaman mei raho tum", in singer Saleem Raza's voice but wanted Rushdi to re-record the song as he was not satisfied with Saleem Raza's singing. Rushdi did so, and the song recorded in his voice satisfied composer Khalil. Raza's career, as a singer was affected and doomed later on. After that, whenever Khalil composed music for any film, Rushdi remained his first choice. The mid-1960s saw the rise of brilliant singers like Mehdi Hassan and Masood Rana, but it did not affect Rushdi's career and he kept on leading the film music.

Music experts including Nisar Bazmi, Sohail Rana, and M. Ashraf are unanimous that Rushdi's voice was best suited for every hero, comedian, and even character actor. He lent his voice to Waheed Murad, Nadeem, Mohammad Ali, Santosh Kumar, Darpan, Habib, Rehman, Shahid, Qavi Khan, Ghulam Mohiuddin, and Rahat Kazmi and was tailor-made for every actor of the film industry. Rushdi's voice was even ideally suited to comedians such as Munawar Zarif, Lehri, Nirala, Nanha, and Rangeela.

Rushdi recorded the ghazal "Shok-e-awargi", written by poet Habib Jalib for actor Syed Kamal, in the 1963 film Joker. This ghazal sung by Rushdi, gained popularity amongst music listeners. Rushdi and Jalib again teamed up for Mohammad Ali in the films Khamosh Raho (1964). Rushdi sang the ghazal "Mei Nahi Manta" for the same film and gained Habib Jalib countrywide fame. He recorded a qawwali, "Madiney waley ko mera salam kehdena", along with Munir Husain the same year.

Actor Nadeem's first film as a leading actor was Chakori (1967). Rushdi recorded four songs for this film in the composition of music director Robin Ghosh. "Kabhi toe tum ko yaad ayen gi," "Pyare pyare yar humare", and "Tujhe chahein meri bahein". The same year, the film Doraha and Shehnai were released. He recorded all the songs for these films, including "Bhooli hue hoon dastan", "tumhein kaise bta doon", "Han issi mor per" (film Doraha) and "Tujhey apney dil se mei kaise", "Nazaron se haseen hai", and "Dunya mei tumko jeena hai agar" (film Shehnai).

In 1968, Rushdi recorded his first ever Bengali song in the film Notun Name Dako of Dhaka, titled "Ke Tumi Ele Go", which became a smashing hit in then–East Pakistan. He sang playback hits in the same year like "Ae mere diwaney dil" (film Jahan tum wahan hum), "Socha tha pyar na karein ge" (film Ladla), "Usey dekha usey chaha usey bhool gaye" (film Jahan tum wahan hum), "Teri aankhon ke bheegey sitarey" (film Ma Beta), and many more. The same year, Rushdi recorded a song "Salam-e-mohabbat" for Mohammad Ali in Khawaja Khurshid Anwar's composition.

Rushdi sang for Waheed Murad in the 1969 film Naseeb Apna Apna. The song "Ae abr-e-kaaram aaj itna baras" brought another Nigar Award for him. The song was composed by Lal Mohammad Iqbal. He also won different awards for songs like "Dil tumko de diya hai" and "Hum se na bigar aye larki". Around the same year, he sang a duet with Mala in the film Baharei phir bhi ayen gi, "Khush naseebi hai meri", under the music direction of Shamim Nazli.

In 1969, the film Andaleeb was released. Ahmed Rushdi recorded all the songs for Waheed Murad in this film. The song "Kuch log rooth ker bhi" was a hit. Its sad version was sung by Noor Jahan. Although he sang for every film hero in Pakistan, his pairing with Waheed Murad, proved to be the most popular, in such movies as Armaan (1966); the song "Akele Na Jaana" from that movie in Sohail Rana's composition gained Rushdi another Nigar Award. Well-known hits of Rushdi picturised on Waheed Murad, such as "Lag rahi hai mujhey aaj sari faza ajnabi" or "Kuchh loag rooth kar bi" were composed by Nisar Bazmi, the legendary composer for Pakistani movies. Ahmed Rushdi-Nisar Bazmi pair and Ahmed Rushdi-Sohail Rana combination were two of the most successful singer-music director pairs of Pakistan film music.

=== 1970s and 1980s ===
The 1970s brought new faces such as Alamgir, Akhlaq Ahmed, Ghulam Abbas, A Nayyar, etc. But Rushdi remained a leading singer of the film industry. Films Bandagi, Naag Muni, and Baazi were released in 1971. Ahmed Rushdi had a playback in all three films. He also won several awards for songs such as "Aik albeli si naar" (Naag Muni), "Tum bhi ho ajnabi" (Baazi), and "Poocho na hum ne kis liye" (Intezar). Perhaps, the song below never rang as true as it did after Ahmed Rushdi's demise: "Chore chalay hum chore chalay lo sheher tumhara chore chalay", film, Phir Chand Nikley Ga (1970), music, Sohail Rana.

Rushdi sang four solo songs and one duet for Waheed in the film Khalish (1972). "Honto pe tera naam" (with Mala), "Kal achanak jo sar-e-rah mili thi", "Ghussey mei gulabi gaal", and "Pyar hota hai". M. Ashraf was the music director. Around the same year, he sang for Mohammad Ali in the film Mohabbat. Rushdi recorded three songs in the film, including the sad song "Khudara mohabbat na karna". The music director was Nisar Bazmi.

In 1973, he recorded a qawwali "Dil torney waley" for the film Mehboob mera mastana. Ahmed Rushdi also recorded a romantic number "Teri jabeen se chodhwin ka chand jhankta rahey" (film Nadan) for actor Rehman. He recorded a sad song, "Angara mera mann", for the film Jaal, which was released the same year. He was also fond of acting and appeared in thirteen films as an actor, including Anokhi (1956), Kaneez (1965), Saat Lakh (1967), and Dekha Jaye Ga (1976). He also composed a music album in singer Mujeeb Aalam's voice.

In 1974, the film Anhoni was released. Waheed Murad and Aliya were in leading roles. Music director Lal Mohammad Iqbal recorded two songs in Rushdi's voice: "Hai kahan who kali" and a sad number, "Mei tujhey Nazar kia doon". In the same year, he sang for actor Shahid in the film Dharkan. He recorded a romantic number "Rangat gulabi chehra kitabi" for Shahid.

In 1975, Ahmed Rushdi recorded "Dil ko jalana hum ne chor diya" for Mohabbat Zindagi Hai. This song was picturised on Waheed Murad and gained countrywide popularity. He sang another song, "Mashriqi rang ko chor ke", for the same film. He recorded many songs for Pakistani television, including "Dil mei tu hai", "Han issi mor pe", and "Bheegey hue mousam mei".

Sharmeeli (1978) was his last film with actor Nadeem as a playback singer. It was a successful musical film whose songs gained popularity among the masses. Rushdi recorded two songs for Nadeem, "Tu samney hai mere" and "Bheegey hue mousam mei". The same year he recorded the popular song for Mohammad Ali "Aagey aagey mohtarma peechey peechey mohtram" (for the film Apka Khadim). He sang a classical number "Tere naina barey chit chor" for the film Jab Jab Phool Khiley the following year. He also sang in films like Accident, Achey Mian, Bohut Khoob, Baarat and Aag Aur Zindagi.

The year 1980 proved to be a nightmare for Pakistan film industry. The number of Urdu films decreased rapidly and the era of Punjabi films started. In those films there was very little room for male playback singers as those movies were completely dominated by the songs in mostly female voices. Immediately following the military installation of Muhammad Zia-ul-Haq as president, measures were put in place to limit the distribution of music and the only source of entertainment was the government-owned television network Pakistan Television Corporation (PTV). While music videos were banned in the country. Rushdi sang in films such as Farzana, Hanstey Aansoo, Haseena Maan Jaye Gi etc. but his glorious singing career was almost coming to an end.

Rushdi was not only singing for films, but was also an equally busy figure for radio and television. He remained a leading singer between 1954 and 1983. He sang for all the famous actors of the Pakistani film industry. Rushdi recorded his last song "Ban ke misra ghazal ka" in 1983 for the film Hero, which was picturised on Waheed Murad and the song was a hit. He recorded a large number of duets in many languages with Noor Jahan, Zubaida Khanum, Runa Laila, Mala, Naheed Niazi, Irene Parveen, Naseem Begum, Mehnaz, Rubina Badar and Naheed Akhtar in his 33-year singing career.

== Honorific title of Magician of Voice ==
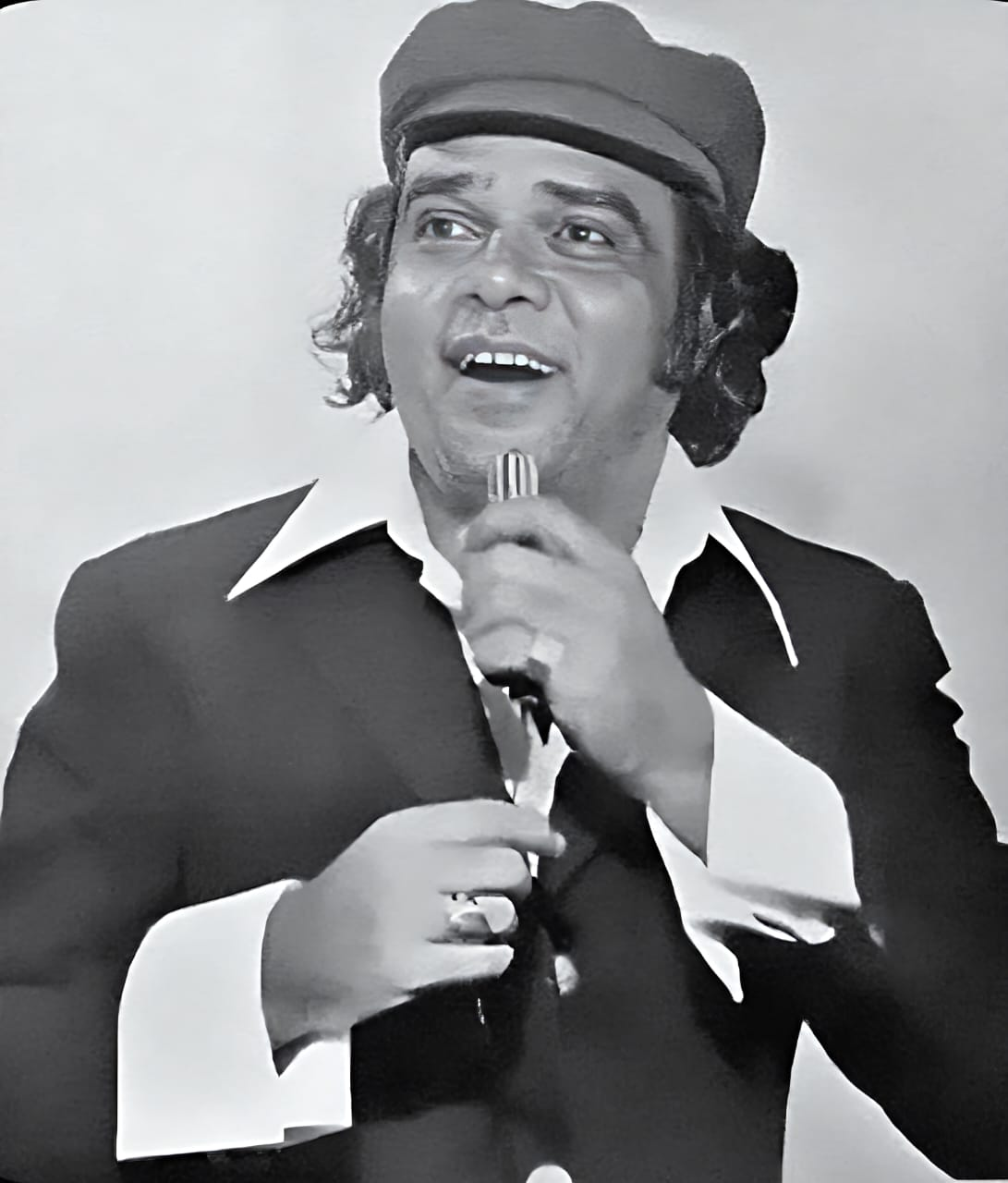
Rushdi performing live on stage

Ahmed Rushdi is credited with the honorific nickname of "Magician of Voice" because of his ability of singing in different genres including happy, comedy, tragedy, qawwali, lullaby, patriotic, pop, revolutionary and folk. Rushdi's renditions of "sharaabi" (drunk) songs and "tauba" (hangover/regret) songs are notable in South Asian cinema because he could flawlessly mimic the slurs, hiccups, and emotional instability of an intoxicated man without actually being drunk. He was not only the first South Asian vocalist to go pop but also inspired generations with his clear delivery, timely expressions and rendition of songs. He had the unique quality of giving expressions during singing along with producing sounds of different birds and objects. He recorded a song "Burhapey mein dill na lagana" in the film Jub Jub Phool Khile for actors Waheed Murad and Nadeem in both young and old voices in a single go which attracted huge admiration from music critics.

== First regular pop singer of South Asia ==
Ahmed Rushdi is considered to be the first regular pop singer of South Asia as he introduced hip-hop, rock and roll, disco and other modern genres in South Asian music and has since then been adopted in Bangladesh, India and lately Nepal as a pioneering influence in their respective pop cultures. Following Rushdi's success, Christian bands specialising in jazz started performing at various night clubs and hotel lobbies in Karachi, Hyderabad, Mumbai, Dhaka and Lahore. They would usually sing either famous American jazz hits or cover Rushdi's songs. Rushdi sang playback hits along with Runa Laila until the Bangladesh Liberation War when East Pakistan was declared an independent state.

Because of Ahmed Rushdi, Pakistani music industry has steadily spread throughout South Asia and today is the most popular genre in Pakistan and the neighbouring South Asian countries. Pop icons like Alamgir, Mohammed Ali Shehki and Nazia Hassan later on followed Rushdi's landmarks in playback singing.

== Personal life ==
=== Marriage ===
Ahmed Rushdi married Humera on 30 November 1963. His wife died in 1992, nine years after Rushdi. He belonged to a Sayed family (a sacred caste in muslims) and was a religious person. Despite his popularity and fame, Rushdi never had any scandal in his entire career. He had three daughters. His younger daughter, Rana Rushdi used to sing her father's songs in his presence which always pleased Rushdi a lot. He was against allowing his daughters to adopt singing as a profession. Ahmed Rushdi and Noor Jahan were the highest-paid singers in their time but Rushdi did not charge those producers and music directors a single rupee, who could not afford him. The music director Lal Mohammad Iqbal made his entry into the Pakistan film industry, because Rushdi introduced him to different producers, which he disclosed after Rushdi's death. Likewise, the poet Masroor Anwer got his first film as Rushdi insisted the music director Manzoor-Ashraf give Masroor a chance.

=== Last years ===
In the early 1980s, Rushdi shifted to Karachi as he was not feeling well and wanted to have a proper heart treatment. He was also singing less for films and film music itself was facing a decline. The 1980s saw a nose-dive in the progress of cinema in Pakistan. The number of cinemas decreased rapidly and people preferred watching television over going to a cinema. Playback singing that once was popular now struggled to exist and the singers needed a new medium to start afresh. Even then, Rushdi's demand and popularity was still there with the music directors. He opened a music academy in order to teach music and playback singing to youngsters. Ahmed Rushdi never faced downfall as far as his singing career was concerned.

Until the 1970s, Rushdi was one of the leading voices in the Indian subcontinent. He recorded fewer songs in his last years on the advice of doctors.

== Death ==
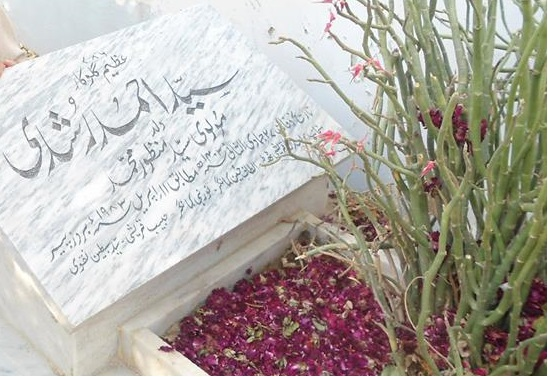
Ahmed Rushdi's grave at Sakhi Hassan cemetery, Karachi

Since 1976, Ahmed Rushdi was a heart patient and his doctors advised him to abstain from singing, but Rushdi refused by saying that music was his life. When he had a second heart attack in 1981, he was composing a musical album in the voice of singer Mujeeb Aalam. On the night of 11 April 1983, he had a third heart attack. He was immediately taken to the hospital but was pronounced dead by the doctors. He was 48. Rushdi was buried at Sakhi Hassan Graveyard, Karachi. His last non-film song was "Aaney walo suno" which was a duet with Mehnaz.

On his death, actor Waheed Murad said, "Today I have lost my voice." Waheed further said in an interview, "Sometimes I think that if I suddenly disappear or am no more for any reason, I would like to be remembered by the song 'Bhooli hui hoon dastaan, guzra hua khayal hoon-Jisko na tum samajh sakay mien aisa aik sawal hoon'." (I'm a tale forgotten, a thought bygone. I'm the question which you couldn't understand) which was also picturised on him in 1967 and sung by Rushdi. After Rushdi's death, Murad as well as other friends and singers had appeared on a show to pay him a tribute; many of those same people appeared on the show six months later, reminiscing about Waheed as he also died.

== Popularity and influence ==
Rushdi changed the sound of film music in the Indian subcontinent and his impact has also been felt on the Indian and Bangladeshi film industries. He is widely regarded as one of the remarkable singers from South Asia and was effective in every genre of singing including ghazals and qawwalis.

Music director Nisar Bazmi in an interview said, "Ahmed Rushdi and Mohammad Rafi are amongst those few singers in the subcontinent, whose voices did not form 'cones', as they rose and touch the higher notes. Their volumes rose up without getting squeaky!" Bazmi also quoted the song "Aisey bhi hain meharban" (from the film Jaisey jantey nahin) to prove that Rushdi was also a master of serious singing. In another interview he said, "I was happy and amazed to find a Chinese group rendering this song on one occasion. People from abroad also sing Rushdi's songs which clearly indicates his popularity and influence."

Indian playback singer Kishore Kumar, being an admirer of Ahmed Rushdi, paid him a tribute at Royal Albert Hall London by singing Rushdi's one of the songs "Aik urran khattola aye ga kisi lal pari ko laye ga". Kishore publicly praised Rushdi's playback genius, acknowledging that Rushdi had perfected the art of conversational screen singing before anyone else.

Sonu Nigam, Shaan and Kumar Sanu, who remained leading playback singers in the Indian film industry, also paid their tributes to Rushdi and sang his songs.

Actor Nadeem in a television interview said, "Ahmed Rushdi had an amazing voice quality and he made my work easier."

Many of his contemporaries compared his music with that of classically trained singers, although Rushdi never had any influences from any classical singer. He is famously known as "Magician of Voice" and his popularity also turned traditional classical singers against him but did not affect his fame and his death is termed as an irreparable loss to the industry.

Actor Waheed Murad declared Rushdi's song, "Bhooli hui hoon daastan", his favorite song. Music directors like M. Ashraf and Nisar Bazmi also hold century partnerships with Ahmed Rushdi as they composed hundreds of songs for him. According to complete songography, M. Ashraf composed 734 songs in 211 films for Rushdi but available figures indicate a composition of 132 songs in 100 films for him. The first film of this pair was Speran in 1961 and the last was Hero in 1983.

In 2018, Ahmed Rushdi's impact forced Coke Studio Pakistan (in season 11) to produce a remake of Rushdi's first South Asian pop song "Ko Ko Korina" in the voices of Momina Mustehsan and Ahad Raza Mir, which raised nationwide hue and cry to the extent that Minister for Human Rights in Pakistan Shireen Mazari had to come out in media to term the remake as "horrendous" since the classic was widely believed to be destroyed by both singers.

Ahmed Rushdi influenced many singers in the music industry including A. Nayyar, Mujeeb Aalam, Naheed Niazi, Runa Laila and Bashir Ahmad. He is included among those artists around the world who continue to be popular and enjoy a huge fan base even after their death.

== Awards ==
Nigar Awards

- 1961 – Best Male Playback Singer for the song "Chand Sa Mukhra Gora Badan" (چاند سا مکھڑا گورا بدن) in film Saperan
- 1962 – Best Male Playback Singer for the song "Gol Gappey Wala" (گول گپے والا) in film Mehtaab
- 1963 – Best Male Playback Singer for the song "Kisi Chaman Mei Raho" (کسی چمن میں رہو) in film Anchal
- 1966 – Best Male Playback Singer for the song "Akeley Na Jana" (اکیلے نا جانا) in film Armaan
- 1970 – Best Male Playback Singer for the song "Aey Abr-e-Karam" (اے ابر کرم) in film Naseeb Apna Apna
- 2004 – Life Time Achievement Award

Graduate Awards

- 1965 – Best Male Playback singer for the song "Mohabbat Mei Tere Ser Ki Qasam" in film Aisa Bhi Hota Hai
- 1967 – Best Male Playback singer for the song "Haan Issi Mor par" in film Doraha
- 1968 – Best Male Playback singer for the song "Kabhi Toe Tumko Yaad Ayen Gi" in film Chakori
- 1969 – Best Male Playback singer for the song "Kuch Log Rooth Kar Bhi" in film Andaleeb
- 1970 – Best Male Playback singer for the song "Lag Rahi Hai Mujhey Aaj Sari Fiza" in film Anjuman

Musawwir Awards

- 1972 – Best Male Playback singer for the song "Meri Jaan Meri Jaan Yehi Zindagi Hai" in film Bandagi
- 1973 – Best Male Playback singer for the song "Hai Kahan Woh Kali" in film Anhoni
- 1975 – Best Male Playback singer for the song "Mashriqi Rang Ko Chor Ke" in film Mohabbat Zindagi Hai
- 1978 – Best Male Playback singer for the song "Tu Saamney Hai Mere" in film Sharmeeli
- 1979 – Best Male Playback singer for the song "Sab Kamron Mein Band Hain" in film Zameer

Other awards

- 1967 – Best Sad Song Award for "Tujhey Apney Dil Se Mei Kaisey Bhuladoon" in the film Shehnai
- 1968 – Classic Award for the song "Kiya Hai Jo Pyar To Padega Nibhana" in the film Dil Mera Dharkan Teri
- 1970 – Silver Screen Award for the song "Chhor Chaley Hum Chhor Chaley" in the film Phir Chand Nikley Ga
- 1973 – Al-Fankar Award for the song "Mei Tujhey Nazar kya Doon" in the film Anhoni
- 1975 – Screen Light Award for the song "Dil Ko Jalana Hum Ne Chor Diya" in the film Mohabbat Zindagi Hai
- 1983 – Rooman Award for the song "Ban Ke Misra Ghazal Ka Chaley Aaona" in the film Hero
- 2000 – Best Singer of the Millennium Award
- 2001 – Legend Award
- 2004 – Sitara-i-Imtiaz
- 2005 – Indus TV Indus Music Hall of Fame
- 2012 – Lux Style Award Lifetime Achievement Award

== See also ==
- Playback singer
- Ghazal
- Cinema of Pakistan
- Honorific nicknames in popular music
- List of Pakistani film singers
- List of Pakistani ghazal singers
- List of Pakistani actors
