= Masroor Anwar =

Pakistani poet (1944 - 1996)

- Born: 6 January 1944; Shimla, Punjab, British India
- Died: 1 April 1996 (aged 52); Lahore, Punjab, Pakistan
- Occupations: Urdu poet, journalist, Film Songs writer
- Writing career
- Genres: Ghazal and Nazm poetry, film music lyrics
- Notable awards: Nigar Awards in 1968 and 1970; Pride of Performance Award (1997) by the Government of Pakistan

Masroor Anwar (6 January 1944 – 1 April 1996) was a Pakistani ghazal poet, film song lyricist and a film screenwriter. He wrote the lyrics for 'Ko Ko Korina', South Asia's first pop song, and working alongside Sohail Rana, film director Pervez Malik and film producer and actor Waheed Murad in the 1960s. He was part of the country's golden age of cinema, helping establish Karachi as a major hub for film production.

== Early life and career ==
He was born in 1944 in Shimla, Punjab, British India and following the partition, moved to Karachi, Pakistan. In Karachi, he grew up to be a chubby and baby-faced young man. After finishing his basic education from Government Islamia Science College, Karachi, he worked for Pakistan International Airlines (PIA) for a short period and later for Radio Pakistan as a staff artist because of his deep interest in poetry and literature. At Radio Pakistan, he was helped by the film actor Ibrahim Nafees who introduced him to the film producer Iqbal Shehzad. He was hired by Iqbal Shehzad to write his first film song for his film Banjaran (1962). Then he became part of a group of four people in Karachi – including Waheed Murad, Pervez Malik, and Sohail Rana – that made many big hit films together in the 1960s and 1970s.

== Death and legacy ==
He died in Lahore on 1 April 1996 at age 51 and was laid to rest at Karim Block graveyard, Iqbal town, Lahore.

In the history of Pakistani cinema, Masroor Anwar was considered one of the best film song writers. Besides film songs, he also wrote some touching popular patriotic songs.

== Popular songs ==
Song	Singer	Music director	Film or Television notes
Master Jee Hamein Sabaq Parha Do	Nahid Niazi	Deebo Bhattacharya	Banjaran (1962 film); Masroor Anwar's first film song
Chanda Se Milne Chali Hai Chakori	Mala	Sohail Rana	Jab Se Dekha Hai Tumhein (1962 film)
Apni Jaan Nazar Karoon, Apni Wafa Pesh Karoon (a patriotic song)	Mehdi Hassan		A Radio Pakistan production (1965)
Mujhe Ik Larki Se Pyaar Ho Gaya	Salim Shehzad and Shazia	Sohail Rana	Heera Aur Pathar (1964 film)
Akelay Na Jaana Hamein Chhorr Kar Tum	Mala and Ahmed Rushdi	Sohail Rana	Armaan
Ko Ko Korina	Ahmed Rushdi	Sohail Rana	Armaan (1966 film)
Bare Be-Murrawwat Hein Yeh Husn Waalay, Kahin Dil Lagaanay Ki Koshish Na Karna	Suraiya Multanikar	Deebo Bhattacharya	Badnaam (1966 film); This one was a huge 'mujra' song hit
Mujhe Tum Nazar Se Gira Tau Rahe Ho	Mehdi Hassan	Sohail Rana	Doraha
Ik Sitam Aur Meri Jann, Abhi Jaan Baqi Hai	Mehdi Hassan	Nisar Bazmi	Saiqa (1968)
Dil Dharke Mein Tum Se Yeh Kaise Kahoon, Kehti Hai Meri Nazar Shukriya	Runa Laila	Nisar Bazmi	Anjuman
Sohni Dharti Allah Rakhay Qadam Qadam Aabad Tujhe (a patriotic song)	Shahnaz Begum	Sohail Rana	A Pakistani television production
Ae Dil Apna Dard Chhupaa Kar, Geet Khushi Ke Gaaey Ja	Akhlaq Ahmed	Nisar Bazmi	Pehchan (1975 film)
Pyar Ki Yaad Nigahon Mein Sajai Rakhna	Salim Shehzad	Nisar Bazmi	Talash (1976 film)

== Awards and recognition ==
- Nigar Award for Best Screenplay Writer for film Saiqa in 1968
- Nigar Award for Best Screenplay Writer for film Sughaat in 1970
- Nigar Award for Best Film Song Lyricist in 1970 for film Anjuman
- Pride of Performance Award by the President of Pakistan (1997)
