= Mohammad Ali (actor) =

Pakistani actor (1931–2006)

- محمد علی
- Born: 19 April 1931; Rampur, United Provinces, British India (modern-day Uttar Pradesh, India)
- Died: 19 March 2006 (aged 74); Lahore, Punjab, Pakistan
- Other names: Shahenshah-e-Jazbaat (Urdu: شہنشاہ جذبات); Ali Bhai, Bhaiya
- Occupations: Actor, producer, social worker
- Years active: 1962 – 1995
- Spouse: Zeba
- Children: 1
- Awards: 8 Nigar Awards for Best Actor
- Honours: Pride of Performance by the President of Pakistan (1984)

Mohammad Ali (Urdu: مُحمّد علی; 19 April 1931 – 19 March 2006) was a Pakistani actor. He was known as Shahenshah-e-Jazbaat (Urdu: شہنشاہِ جذبات), meaning The Emperor of Emotions. A versatile performer, he acted in dramatic, romantic, and historical movies. He was voted among 25 of the greatest actors of Asia in a 2010 CNN poll.

== Early life ==
Mohammad Ali was born in Rampur, United Provinces, British India on 10 November 1938. He was the son of Maulana Syed Murshid Ali, an Islamic scholar. He was the youngest of two brothers and two sisters. After his birth the family migrated from Rampur to Rohtak, and from there to Hyderabad, finally settling in Multan shortly after the independence of Pakistan in 1947.

He attended the Millat High School, Multan. He further studied in Government Emerson College, Multan. In 1954, he moved to Hyderabad to pursue higher studies and obtained a BA from City College, Hyderabad.

== Career ==
=== Start of career from Radio Pakistan ===
Muhammad Ali joined Radio Pakistan Hyderabad station as a broadcaster in 1956, where his elder brother Irshad was already working as a drama artist. After a while, he moved to the Bahawalpur radio station and eventually to Radio Pakistan, Karachi where its then Director General Zulfiqar Ali Bukhari became the mentor for his acting career.

=== Film career ===
Zulfiqar Ali Bukhari, Director General, Radio Pakistan introduced him to the film producer Fazal Ahmed Kareem Fazli.

So Mohammad Ali started his film career with Fazal Ahmad Karim Fazli's film Chiragh Jalta Raha (1962). Chiragh Jalta Raha was premiered by Fatima Jinnah, the sister of Pakistan's founder Muhammad Ali Jinnah, on 9 March 1962 at Nishat Cinema, Karachi. He then appeared as a villain in director Munawwar Rasheed's film Bahadur, director Iqbal Yusuf's film Daal Mein Kala, and director Javed Hashmi's film Dil Ne Tujhay Maan Liya. His first film as a hero was Mr. X. But the movie Shararat (1963) was released earlier than his first film Mr. X. Later, he moved to Lahore and worked in the movie Khandan (1964). But his breakthrough came with the film Khamosh Raho (1964). In 1989, he had an extended cameo in the Hindi film Clerk.

Mohammad Ali was the lead actor and 'hero' in 94 films. His first lead acting credit was Shararat (1963) and his last movie as a lead actor was Aaj Ki Raat (1983). Another movie was Mohabbat ho to Aeisi (1989) and the last movie of his career was Dum Mast Qalander (1995).

== Playback singers ==
Ali was most often voiced by Mehdi Hassan and Ahmed Rushdi. Mehdi Hassan sang 115 songs for Ali in 88 movies. Rushdi sang 100 songs in 57 movies for Ali. Masood Rana sang 34 songs for Ali in his 23 films. Others who provided their voice were Akhlaq Ahmed, Ghulam Abbas, Rajab Ali and Mujeeb Aalam.

== Personal life ==
Ali met Zeba for the first time in 1962 during the filming of their debut film Chiragh Jalta Raha (1962). The couple got married four years later, on 29 September 1966, during the filming of Tum Mile Pyar Mila and remained married until Ali's death in 2006. The marriage was described as a love marriage by the couple.

They did not have any children together. However, Mohammad Ali legally adopted Samina, Zeba's daughter from her previous marriage, giving her the name Samina Ali.

== Political and social activism ==
Mohammad Ali and his wife Zeba both had close relations with different political regimes in the country. At the International Moscow Film Festival, he wore a black dress in protest against India holding 93,000 POWs after the 1971 war. In Nawaz Sharif's government, he also served as the cultural minister and introduced new policies to improve the condition of Pakistani film Industry.

=== Ali-Zaib Foundation ===
Muhammad Ali along with Shahid Ali Zaidi founded Ali-Zaib Foundation in 1995 to help Thalassemia patients. The foundation built hospitals in Sargodha, Sahiwal, Jhang, Gujranwala, and Okara, with its head office in Faisalabad.

== Retirement from films and his death ==
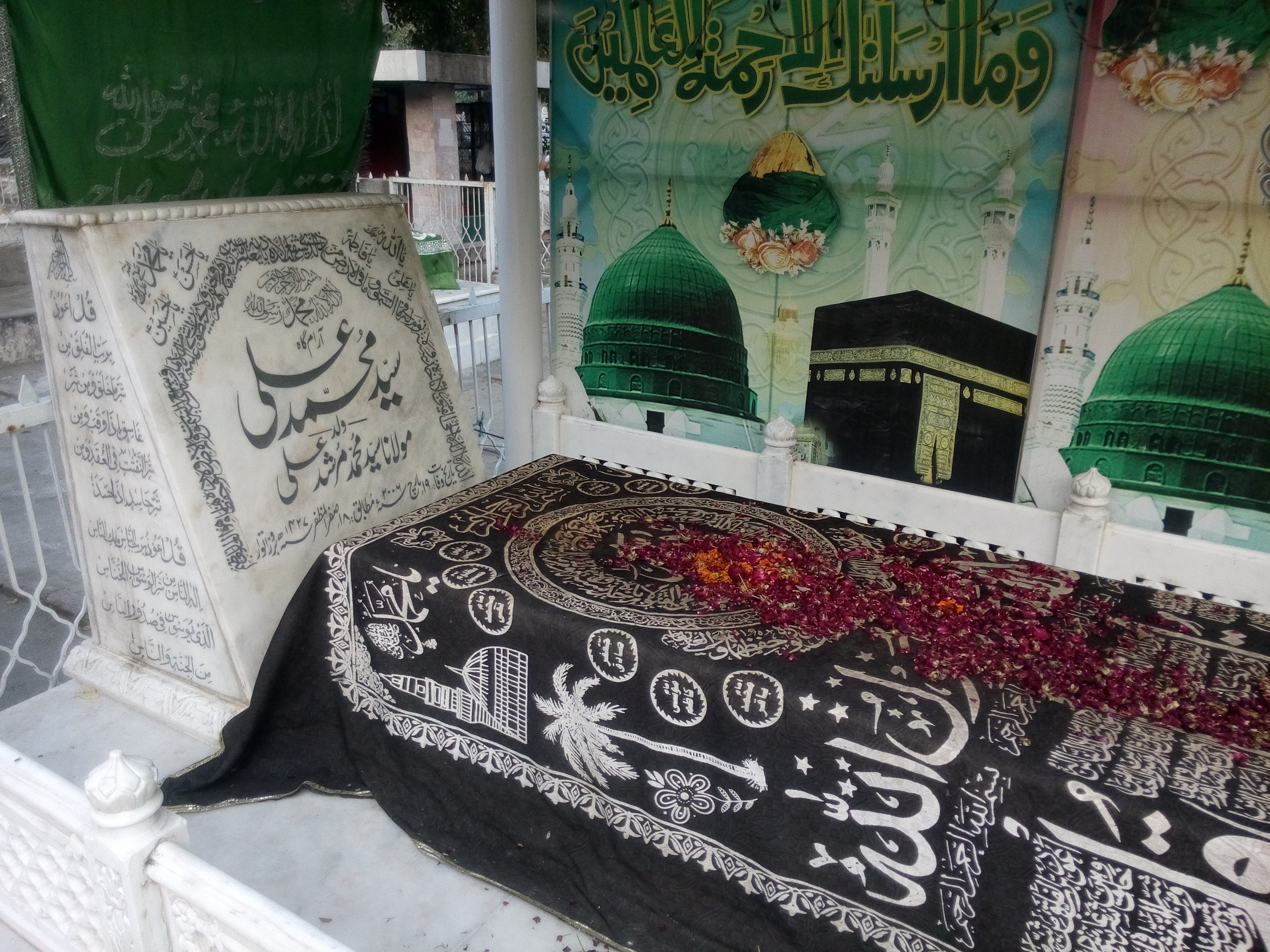
Ali's last resting place in the courtyard of Mian Mir Shrine at Lahore

After his retirement from films, when Mohammad Ali was asked in a television show about his disassociation from the films, he said: "The atmosphere in which I was accustomed to work for films and the way films are made now, have entirely changed, hence I called it quits." He was very generous and warm towards his fans. One of the best Pashto poets Zahir Shah Zahir has dedicated all his poetry to Mohammad Ali which includes more than ten books. The poet used to visit his house and have long discussions about the social welfare of people and Pakistani society.

Mohammad Ali died on 19 March 2006 due to a heart attack in Lahore.

== Awards and recognition ==
He won 10 Nigar awards in his long film career starting from 1964 to 1984.

- Nigar Award for Best Supporting Actor in film Khamosh Raho (1964)
- Nigar Award for Best Actor in film Kaneez (1965)
- Nigar Award for Best Actor in film Aag Ka Darya (1966)
- Nigar Award for Best Actor in film Saiqa (1968)
- Nigar Award for Best Actor in film Insaan Aur Aadmi (1970)
- Nigar Award for Best Actor for Wehshi (1971)
- Nigar Award for Best Actor in film Aas (1973)
- Nigar Award for Best Actor for film Aaina Aur Soorat (1974)
- Nigar Award for Best Actor for film Haidar Ali (1978)
- Special Nigar Award in 1984 for films Doorian and Bobby
- Pride of Performance Award, which is the nation's third highest civilian award, given by then President of Pakistan Zia ul Haq in 1984, in recognition of his lifelong services to the entertainment industry of Pakistan. Later, he was also honoured with the Tamgha-e-Imtiaz (Medal of Excellence), the second highest civilian award in Pakistan.

He received many honours and special awards like the Millennium Legend Star Graduate Award in 2000, Ilyas Rasheedi Gold medal 1998, Nigar Lifetime Achievement Award 1998, Nigar Millennium Award 2000, Lifetime Excellency Award 1997, Pakistan Best Personality Award 1997. He received Bolan Awards, Screen Light Awards, National Academy Awards, Critics Award, Cultural Award from Punjab University and an Asian Academy Award. He received the first foreign award Al-Nasr Award in Dubai 1984. He was also awarded the Naushad Award of India.

== See also ==
- List of Urdu-language films
- List of Lollywood actors
