= Waheed Murad =

Pakistani actor, film producer and director

SI Waheed Murad
- وحید مراد
- Born: 2 October 1938; Sialkot, Punjab, British India (now Pakistan)
- Died: 23 November 1983 (aged 45); Karachi, Sindh, Pakistan
- Other names: Chocolate Hero; Lady Killer
- Education: Sindh Muslim Government Arts & Commerce College, Karachi; University of Karachi
- Occupation: Actor • film producer • screenwriter
- Years active: 1959–1983
- Notable work: Heera Aur Pathar, Armaan
- Spouse: Salma Murad (m. 1964)
- Children: 3, including Adil Murad
- Awards: Sitara-i-Imtiaz (Star of Excellence) by the President of Pakistan (posthumously in 2010 6 Nigar Awards

Waheed Murad (Urdu: وحید مراد; 2 October 1938 – 23 November 1983), also known as Chocolate Hero, was a Pakistani film actor, producer and script writer. Famous for his charming expressions, attractive personality, tender voice and unusual talent for acting, Murad was considered one of the most famous and influential actors of Pakistan and South Asia.

Murad was born in Sialkot, Pakistan. He graduated from the S. M. Arts College Karachi, and then earned a master's degree in English literature from University of Karachi. He started his film career in a cameo in 1959 in the film Saathi when he was 21 years old. The film, Armaan, which was produced by him, was the first Pakistani film to complete 75 weeks in cinemas. Murad is the only actor of film industry to secure the highest number of platinum, diamond, golden and silver jubilees. He mesmerized Pakistani nation during 1960s and 1970s more than anyone before or after and is considered to be evergreen chocolate hero of Pakistan's silver screen history. He acted in 125 feature films and earned 32 film awards.

In November 2010, 27 years after his death, the Pakistani President Asif Ali Zardari posthumously awarded him the Sitara-e-Imtiaz, the third highest honour and civilian award by the State of Pakistan, given in the fields of literature, arts, sports, medicine, or science. On 2 October 2019, Google celebrated Murad's 81st birthday with a doodle on its homepage for Pakistan, India and several other countries.

== Early life ==
Murad was an only child who was born in Sialkot and grew up in Karachi. His mother was Shireen Murad (a Christian from Bikaner who had converted to Islam), and his father was Nisar Murad, a film distributor in Bombay, both of whom had migrated to Karachi before the partition of India (1947). He did graduation from S. M. Arts College, Karachi, and then masters in English literature from University of Karachi. His father's family belonged to the cultural elite of Sialkot.

Murad's ancestors had migrated from the Bahmani Sultanate in southern India to Kashmir and eventually settled in Sialkot in the 18th-century. Where Murad's grandfather Zahoor Murad, an advocate and a social activist, adopted the surname "Murad" in 1887. The Murads also claimed Turkish ancestry; claiming that one of their ancestors, Murat, was a soldier of Ottoman-origin serving in the Mughal Army who settled in Punjab.

== Film career ==
Waheed Murad started his film career by playing a cameo in 1959 in Al-Hamid's Saathi. He then his father's established 'Film Art' in 1961 as a producer of the film Insan Badalta Hai. His second film as producer, Jab Se Dakha Hai Tumhein starring Darpan and Zeba, was commercially unsuccessful. Afterwards, Darpan most of the time started coming late at studio. Zeba suggested Waheed to cast himself as hero in his next film. Waheed was not ready to sign himself in his own movies. But when the same suggestion came from his old good friend Pervaiz Malik, he accepted it on the condition that if Zeba would be his co-star, Zeba accepted in return (according to Zeba). As a result, he debuted in a starring role in 1962's Aulad, where he played a support role. The film was directed by S.M. Yousuf. Murad's rise to fame came with Heera Aur Pathar, released in 1964. This film marked a significant milestone in his career as both a producer and actor. Notably, his childhood friend Pervez Malik made his directorial debut with this movie. He got the Nigar award in the Best Actor category for the same film.

In 1966, Murad produced and acted in Armaan, whose story was also written by him and directed by Pervaiz Malik. Nasir, the carefree son of a tycoon who switches place with his friend on their tour to Muree. Surpassing all the former box office records at that time by completing 75 weeks in the theaters, Armaan became the first film to celebrate its platinum jubilee at the box office. The film achieved cult status due to its music, composed by Sohail Rana, especially the song "Ko Ko Korina", the first popsong of South Asia. For the film, Murad received two Nigar awards in the categories of best producer and best actor.

Following the success of Armaan, Murad reunited the team for his next production Ehsaan, released in 1967, which was directed by Pervaiz Malik, and featured music by Sohail Rana. In the film, Murad played a psychiatrist who falls for a widow played by Zeba.

In 1967, he appeared as the leading actor in films like Devar Bhabi, Doraha, Insaaniyat and Maan baap. From 1964 to 1968, Murad and Pervaiz Malik made Heera Aur Pathar, Armaan, Ehsaan, Doraha and Jahan tum wahan hum. The combination of Waheed Murad, Pervaiz Malik, Masroor Anwar, Sohail Rana, Ahmed Rushdi and Zeba created a number of films. Waheed Murad brought Malik, Anwar and Rana under the umbrella of 'Film Arts'. Film Arts broke up and Pervaiz Malik started creating his own projects with new actors. A total of seven films, including two films, i.e., Usey dekha usey chaha and Dushman released after a long gap of 6 years in 1974, were produced with the combination of Waheed and Pervaiz (but not under 'Film Art' Production).

In 1968, Murad started in his production Samandar, co-starring Shabnam. Set in a fishing colony, Samandar explores themes of power struggles, foreign intrusion, and the complexities of relationships between different groups, marking a significant departure from Murad's earlier films. Murad made his debut as a singer in the film by singing "Saathi Tera Mera Saathi Hai" with Masood Rana. The film was a mediocre success at the box office.

In 1969, Murad made his directorial debut with Ishaara, for which he wrote the story and also produced. In the film, Murad played the role of a struggling artist, and sang the song "Jaise Taise Beet Gaya Din" with Deeba. The film also starring Rozina, Aliya and Talish, was commercially unsuccessful. Murad received another Nigar award in the best actor category for the film.

In his 25-year career, Murad paired with many actresses like Zeba, Shamim Ara, Rani, Naghma, Aaliya, Sangeeta, Kaveeta, Aasia, Shabnam, Deeba, Babra Sharif, Rukhsana, Bahar Begum and Neelo. He acted in a total of 124 films (two were released after his death), of which 38 were black and white and 86 were in colour. He also appeared in six films as a guest star including his first and shortest appearance in 1959's Saathi. He acted in 115 Urdu films, 8 Punjabi films and 1 Pushto film, and earned 32 film awards including ones for best producer and for best actor.

In 1986, Zalzala, co-starring Rani, was released, marking Murad's last film as an actor.

=== Film Art productions ===
Waheed Murad produced eleven films under his father's company Film Art. He was the youngest film producer in the Pakistani film industry at that time. Most of his produced films were either Golden Jubilee or Silver Jubilee. During the 1960s and early 1970s, he produced films like Insaan Badalta Hai (1961) (his first film as producer), Armaan (1966), Ehsaan (1967), Naseeb Apna Apna (1970) and Mastana Mahi (Punjabi film of 1971). However, after Mastana Mahi, he produced no film except Hero which was produced in the 1980s and was released after his death.

As a director, he had directed as well as produced Ishaara (1969) with co-star Deeba.

== Playback singers ==
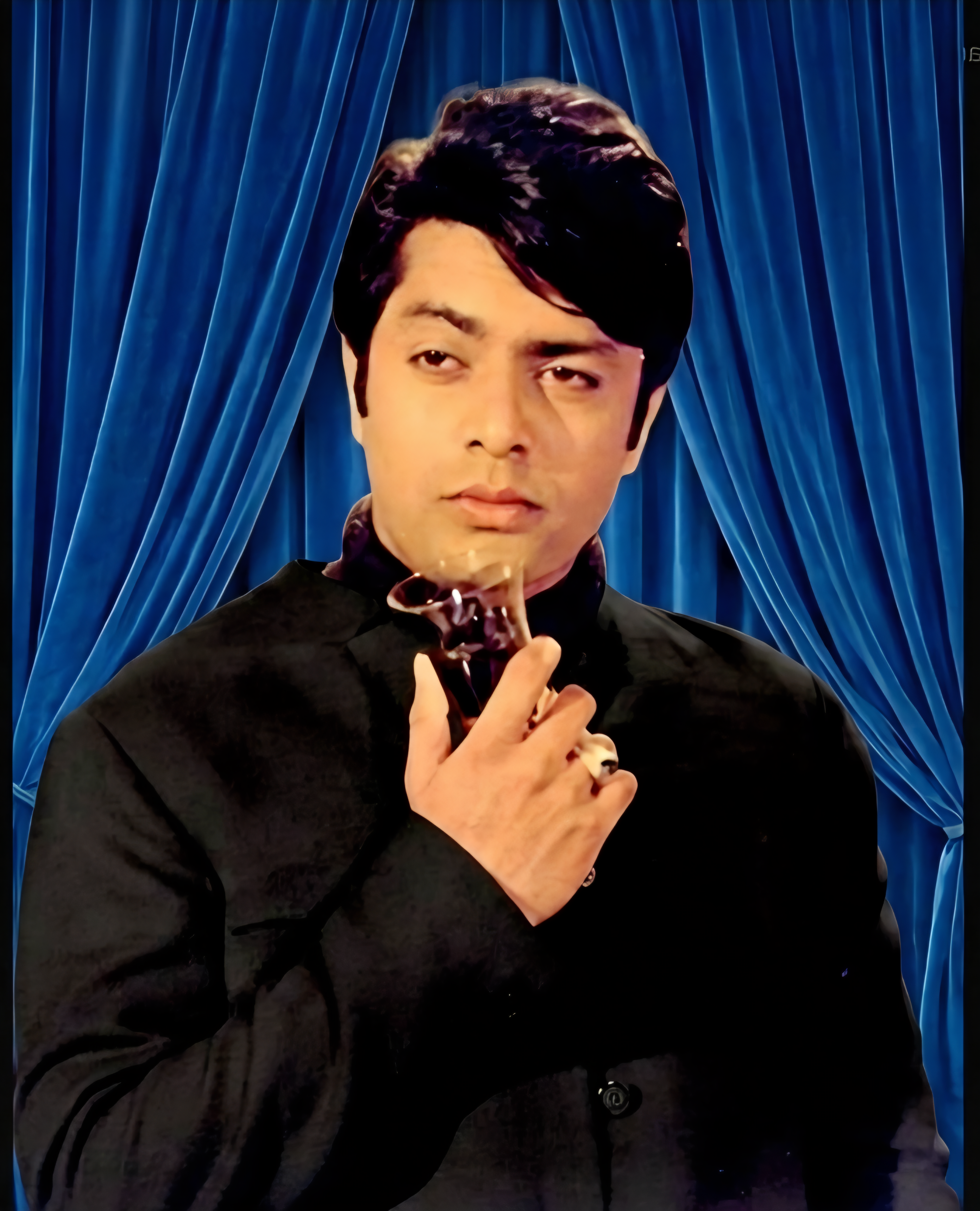
Waheed during lip-syncing a song by Ahmed Rushdi

In Waheed's career, most of the songs picturised by him were sung by Ahmed Rushdi. He sang more than 200 duet and solo songs for him. Other playback singers who provided voice for him were Mehdi Hassan, Masood Rana, Saleem Raza, Akhlaq Ahmed, Mujeeb Aalam, Asad Amanat Ali Khan, Bashir Ahmad, Ustad Amanat Ali Khan and A Nayyar.

In August 2018, Coke Studio produced a remake of Ahmed Rushdi's first South Asian pop song "Ko Ko Korina", originally lip-sync by Waheed Murad in the 1966 film Armaan, in the voices of Mustehsan and Ahad Raza Mir. Their rendition of this Pakistani classic was widely criticized. Within a few days of the video being released on YouTube, it became the most-disliked video in the music show's 11-year history. Waheed Murad's son Adil Murad also reacted to the outcry by apologizing to the song's fans for the controversial remake. In 2022, "Ko Ko Korina", featured in the opening scene of American series Ms. Marvel and won top ratings.

== Later life ==
By the late 1970s, Waheed was being cast in supporting roles either with Nadeem or with Mohammad Ali. Most of the leading heroines like Zeba, Shabnam and Nisho were not allowed to play lead roles with Waheed by their husbands. Pervaiz Malik wrote in a local newspaper: "Not even once during that time [did] Waheed come to me seeking work in my films. Waheed was becoming depressed. His close friends revealed that he was becoming addicted to alcohol, oral tobacco and sleeping pills. Even his domestic life suffered and his wife Salma left for the United States. A combination of bad habits and stress caused ulceration in Waheed's stomach in 1981. He suffered from bleeding and had to undergo stomach removal to save his life. His many fans came to the hospital to donate blood to save his life. Although, he recovered, he lost a significant amount of weight. Even then, Iqbal Akhtar and Iqbal Yousuf, who proved to be real friends in difficult times, cast Waheed Murad in their movies. Waheed appeared old and charmless in Dil ney phir yaad keya and Ghairao. Even his loyal admirers felt that it was all over for him."

In 1983, Anwar Maqsood, a TV writer and anchor and a close friend, invited Waheed to his TV comedy show Silver Jubilee.

Babra Sharif, revealed that during the filming of a scene of Hero, Waheed lost his balance while walking toward her and fell down. He took several minutes to catch his breath prior to standing up on his feet again.

In July 1983, Waheed was driving his car too fast and struck a tree. He was left with a scar on his face. A few days after the accident, Waheed asked his friend Pervez Malik for a role. Malik said, "Get better and you will be the lead in my next film." He replied, "You give me the role and I will get better". He was going to Karachi to get the scar fixed to complete the last few scenes of Hero when he met the chief editor, Ilyas Rasheedi, of the film magazine 'Nigar' at the airport. Rasheedi wrote in his magazine:

By chance a famous film producer was also present in the waiting area and Waheed put him on the spot by asking if he had a role for him for Javed Sheikh's father in his movie. The producer had a difficult time dodging Waheed.

=== Last days and death ===
Waheed's son Adil was in Karachi staying with his grandmother. A day before his face surgery, Waheed celebrated his son's birthday. He bought several gifts for Adil and wished him a happy year.

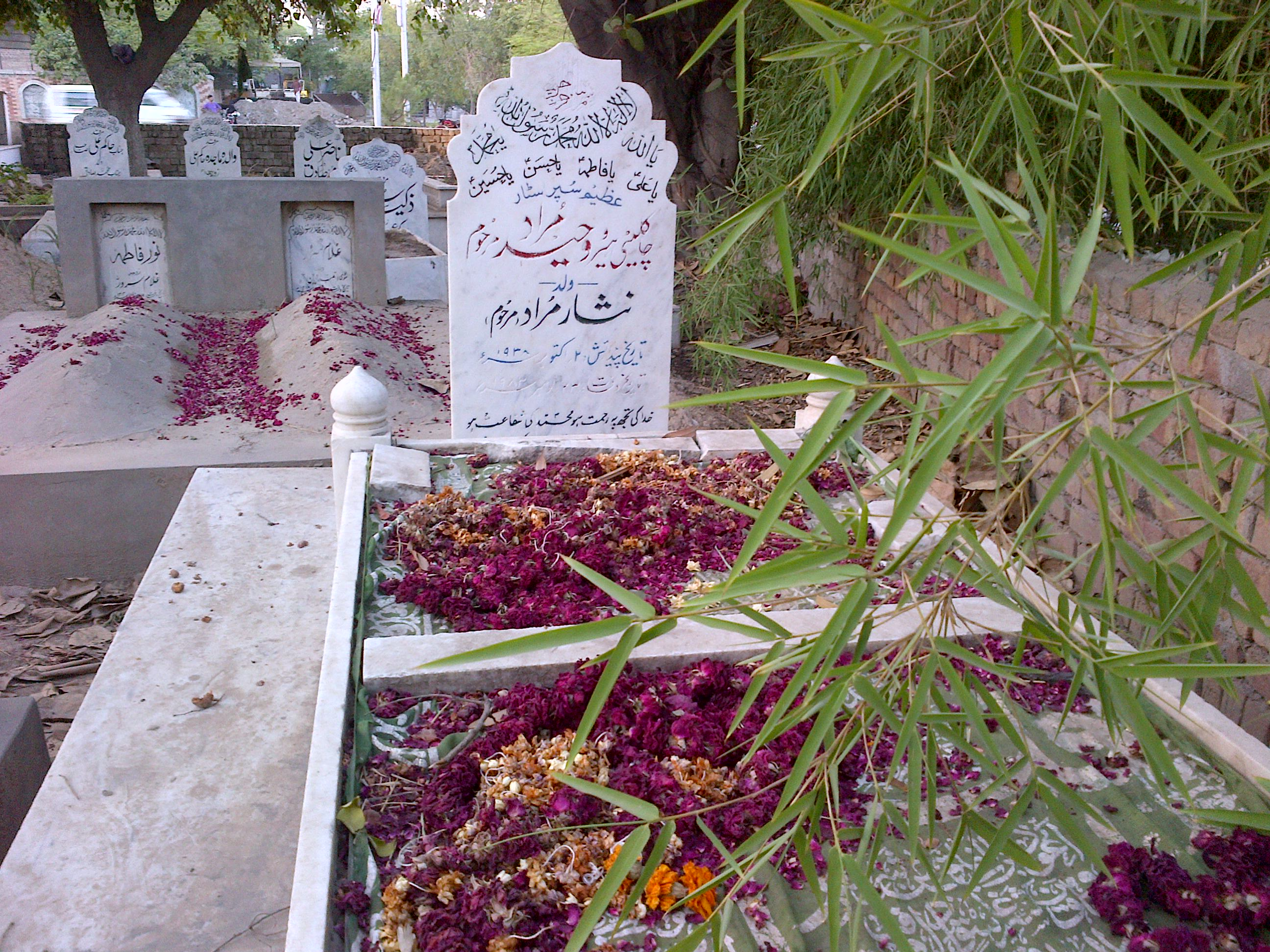
Waheed's grave in Firdous Market graveyard Lahore

He returned late to spend the night at Anita Ayub's mother Mumtaz Ayub's home. When Waheed did not wake up until late, the door had to be forced open and Waheed was found lying on the floor, dead for several hours. A paan leaf with an unidentified substance in it was found in his mouth. It is not clear if the cause of death was a heart attack or suicide. Waheed was buried near his father's grave in Firdous Market Cemetery, Lahore. Whereas, his mother ''Shireen Murad'' (8 June 1915 - 19 November 1989), was buried at Defence housing cemetery Karachi.

== Personal life ==
Waheed Murad married Salma, the daughter of a Karachi-based industrialist, on 17 September 1964. They had two daughters, Aaliya and Sadia, and one son, Adil, who has also been an actor. Sadia died in infancy.

== Awards and honours ==
On 2 October 2019, Google celebrated Murad's 81st birthday with a doodle on its homepage for Pakistan. At PTV Awards in 2012 on 11 June at 17th PTV Awards tributes were paid to him and he was awarded PTV Pakistani Legend Award which was given to his son Adil Murad.

== Tributes and honours ==
His biography Waheed Murad: His Life and Our Times, authored by Khurram Ali Shafique, was published in 2015.

The Government of Pakistan named a street and intersection after him in Lahore on 16 August 2021.

== Sources ==
- Maheen A. Rashdi (25 September 2016). "The people's actor". Dawn.com. Archived from the original on 15 June 2024.
- Muhammad Suhayb (8 October 2018). "In loving memory of Waheed Murad". www.thenews.com.pk. Archived from the original on 16 June 2025.
- "In memoriam: Samandar, a parable?". Dawn.com. 28 November 2010. Archived from the original on 25 June 2025.
- Muhammad Suhayb (9 May 2021). "Flashback: A tale of two Classics". Dawn.com. Archived from the original on 3 June 2025.
- Omair Alavi (22 November 2020). "The Different Avatars of Waheed Murad". www.thenews.com.pk. Archived from the original on 25 June 2025.
