= Agha Sikandar =

Pakistani actor

- آغا سکندر
- Born: Agha Sikandar Abbas; 21 November 1954; Lahore, Pakistan
- Died: 25 May 1993 (aged 38); Lahore, Pakistan
- Resting place: Mominpura Cemetery, Lahore
- Education: University of Punjab
- Occupation: Actor
- Years active: 1979 – 1993
- Spouse: Rubina Sikandar (wife)
- Children: Aagha Ali (son); Ali Sikandar (son)
- Parent: Agha Saleem Raza (father)
- Relatives: Saba Hameed (cousin); Huma Hameed (cousin); Inayat Hussain Bhatti (father-in-law); Shahida Bano (mother-in-law); Waseem Abbas (brother-in-law); Kaifee (uncle); Ali Abbas (nephew); Hina Altaf (daughter-in-law); Ramsha Khan (niece)

Agha Sikandar was a Pakistani television and film actor. He appeared in classic dramas Waris and Dehleez. He also appeared in Urdu and Punjabi films Mian Biwi Razi, Faslay and Jatt Te Dogar.

== Early life ==
Agha was born in 1954 in Lahore, Pakistan and completed his studies at the University of Lahore.

Agha's father Agha Saleem Raza (d. 1965) was an actor in Urdu and Punjabi cinema, mainly known for his roles as villain during the 30s and 40s.

== Career ==
Agha was interested in acting and made his debut as an actor in late 1970s on PTV dramas and he did a number of roles in dramas in the late 1970s. He appeared in the Amjad Islam Amjad drama Waris as Farrukh, the emotional son of a widow, in a role that was a massive hit. Agha then appeared in philosophical telefilm written by Ashfaq Ahmed called Cinderella Aur Sakina with Saba Hameed. Then in 1981 he appeared in drama Dehleez as Abid Khan a villain role which was also written by Amjad Islam Amjad. Agha also appeared in films and he was offered many films from filmmakers.

In 1981 Agha appeared in film Faslay with famous actress Shabnam and actor Muhammad Ali which was a Silver Jubilee. The following year, he appeared in film Mian Biwi Razi with actresses Kaveeta, Tahira Naqvi and actor Nadeem Baig which was box-office hit in which he did a comic role with alongside Sangeeta. Agha was offered more offers from directors, they saw him to be a natural romantic hero. In 1983, he appeared in film Jatt Te Dogar with Sultan Rahi, Mustafa Qureshi, Adeeb and Bahar Begum. Agha was known as an emotionally fragile and romantic person and he usually did the roles of characters which were emotional and fragile in dramas quite close to his life.

When Pakistan Urdu Cinema fell into decline and was replaced by Punjabi films, he felt emotional due to some problems, and his output in both dramas and films began to decline in 1985.

Agha became addicted to heroin which made him even more unpredictable and emotionally fragile. He was sent to rehabilitation to recover but he was in and out on numerous occasions. Agha tried to rekindle the fame he had between the 1970s and 1990s, he couldn't find any acting offers, which drove him into depression.

He completely disappeared from television in early 1993 as his heroin addiction worsened. Agha was emotionally battered, haunted and taunted by his addiction and failing to come to terms with the loss of friends and the fame he once had.

In 1993, Agha was found dead which was announced and according to his contemporaries he had utilised only a small portion of the talent.

== Personal life ==
Agha married Rubina, the daughter of actor Inayat Hussain Bhatti and Shahida Bano.

Agha's sons Aagha Ali and Ali Sikandar are both actors.

Agha's son Agha Ali was married to actress Hina Altaf.

== Illness and death ==
Agha died of a heroin overdose on 25 May 1993 in Lahore. He was 38 years old. Although some of his co-stars initially suspected that he died from a heart attack, it was later revealed he had overdosed. He was laid to rest at Mominpura Cemetery in Lahore.

== Filmography ==
=== Television ===
Year	Title	Role	Network
1979	Waris	Farrukh	PTV
1981	Dehleez	Abid Khan	PTV
1983	Ragon Mein Andhera	Farhan	PTV
1985	Asaan Se Baat	Murad	PTV
1986	Hazaroon Khwahishan	Sir	PTV
1988	Malika-e-Alam	Safi	PTV
1990	Kahani No: 10	Anjam	PTV
1993	Kal Aaj Aur Kal	Shahzad	PTV

=== Telefilm ===
Year	Title	Role
1980	Cinderella Aur Sakina	Nisar

=== Film ===
Year	Film	Language
1981	Faslay	Urdu
1982	Mian Biwi Razi	Urdu
1982	Zara Si Baat	Urdu
1983	Jatt Te Dogar	Punjabi
1985	Shah Behram	Punjabi
