= Shehla Gill =

Pakistani actress (born 1960)

- Born: Shehla Gill; 12 September 1960 (age 65); Lahore, Pakistan
- Education: Kinnaird College for Women
- Occupations: Actress; Model
- Years active: 1977 – 2010
- Children: 2

Shehla Gill is a Pakistani actress. She worked in both Urdu and Punjabi films and is known for her roles in films Mutthi Bhar Chawal (1978), Permit (1979), 2 Rastay (1979), Sathi (1980), Anokha Daaj (1981) Wehshi Daku (1982) and Ek Din Bahu Ka (1982).

== Early life ==
Shehla was born in Lahore at Pakistan and completed her studies from Kinnaird College for Women.

== Career ==
Film actress and director Sangeeta saw her perform at a theatre play at college and offered her to work in films which she accepted. She made her debut as an actress in director Baqar Rizvi's film Black Cat followed by numerous other films, including Shama-e-Mohabbat, Bobby and Julie, and Saheli.

In 1978 her breakthrough came in film Mutthi Bhar Chawal which was directed by Sangeeta and starred with Ghulam Mohiuddin, Sangeeta, Kaveeta and Nadeem Baig. She portrayed the role of Rano's daughter the film received positive reviews and it won numerous awards and she won Nigar Award for Best Supporting Actress.

In 1979 she appeared in films Waaday Ki Zanjeer, Permit, Har Fun Maula, 2 Rastay, Aurat Raj and Sohni Dharti. Later she also started doing modeling for magazines, advertisements and commercials. The following year in 1980 she appeared in films Aap Ki Khatir, Hey Yeh Shohar and Sathi.

In 1981 she worked in films Laggan, Dushman and then she starred in film Anokha Daaj along with Waheed Murad, Ilyas Kashmiri, Aasia and Sabiha Khanum the film was a super hit at box office.

== Personal life ==
Shehla married a businessman. They have two children. The family subsequently settled in France.

== Filmography ==
=== Film ===
Year	Film	Language
1977	Black Cat	Urdu
1977	Shama-e-Mohabbat	Urdu
1977	Bobby And Julie	Urdu
1977	Saheli	Urdu
1978	Mutthi Bhar Chawal	Urdu
1979	Permit	Punjabi
1979	Aurat Raj	Urdu
1979	Waaday Ki Zanjeer	Urdu
1979	Har Fun Maula	Punjabi
1979	2 Rastay	Urdu
1979	Sohni Dharti	Punjabi
1980	Aap Ki Khatir	Urdu
1980	Hey Yeh Shohar	Urdu
1980	Sathi	Urdu
1981	Anokha Daaj	Punjabi
1981	Laggan	Urdu
1981	Dushman	Urdu
1981	Bara Aadmi	Urdu
1982	Wehshi Daku	Punjabi
1982	Aaina Aur Zindagi	Urdu
1982	Mian Biwi Razi	Urdu
1982	Ek Din Bahu Ka	Urdu
1982	I Love You	Urdu
1982	Jagat Tay Murad	Punjabi
1982	Agent 009	Urdu
1983	Jan-o-Janan	Pashto
1984	Chor Chokidar	Punjabi
1985	Shehbaz Khan	Pashto
1987	Kundan	Urdu
1988	Lady Boss	Urdu
1989	Ajal	Pashto

== Awards and recognition ==
Year	Award	Category	Result	Title	Ref.
1978	Nigar Award	Best Supporting Actress	Won	Mutthi Bhar Chawal	
