= Iqbal Bahu =

Pakistani folk singer (1944-2012)

- اقبال باہُو
- Born: 4 September 1944; Gurdaspur, Punjab, British India
- Died: 24 March 2012 (aged 67); Lahore, Punjab, Pakistan
- Occupation: Singer
- Years active: 1964 – 2012
- Known for: Folk, ghazal
- Awards: Tamgha-i-Imtiaz (Medal of Excellence) Award by the Government of Pakistan in 2008

Muhammad Iqbal Bahu (Punjabi, Urdu: اقبال باہُو; 4 September 1944 – 24 March 2012) was a Pakistani sufi and folk singer.

== Early life and career ==
Iqbal Bahu was born as Muhammad Iqbal in Gurdaspur, Punjab, British India in 1944. His family migrated to Pakistan after the partition of India in 1947, and settled in Lahore. Iqbal started his career as a banker. He worked for National Bank from 1971 to 1997, but his singing in Sufi music brought him fame and recognition. Bahu started his singing career in 1964 from Radio Pakistan, Lahore. He was introduced to radio by Muhammad Azam Khan, former chief controller Radio Pakistan. His involvement in the mysticism of the 17th century well-known Punjabi Sufi saint Sultan Bahu made him add Bahu to his name.

He held a special command in Punjabi poetry of Sufi tradition and included works of other saints such as Fariduddin Ganjshakar in his repertoire. In the beginning, he sang mainly for Radio Pakistan and then later for Pakistan Television. Playwright Amjad Islam Amjad created a small role for Bahu in drama serial Waris and also appeared in PTV drama serial Kajal Ghar. He mastered the Sufi tradition of well-known saint Sultan Bahu. He sang many Sufi songs for Radio Pakistan and Pakistan Television.

He also gave concert performances around the globe in his later life including at BBC Bush House, London in 1992. He was awarded Tamgha-i-Imtiaz (Medal of Excellence) Award by the Government of Pakistan in 2008.

== Death ==
Bahu died on 24 March 2012 due to a heart attack in Lahore at age 68 and was laid to rest at Miani Sahib Graveyard, Lahore next day. Among the survivors were his wife, 3 daughters and 2 sons.

== Awards ==
- Tamgha-i-Imtiaz (Medal of Excellence) Award in 2008 by the Government of Pakistan
- Sultan Bahu Award
- PTV Award
- Graduate Award
- Baba Fareed Award
- Hazrat Sultan Bahoo Award
- International Sufi Festival Award
- Red Crescent Award
- Kalam-e-Bahoo Award
- Herf-O-Awaz Award
