= Sohail Asghar =

Pakistani actor (1954–2021)

- سہیل اصغر
- Born: 5 November 1954; Multan, Punjab, Dominion of Pakistan
- Died: 13 November 2021 (aged 67); Lahore, Punjab, Pakistan
- Occupation: Actor
- Years active: 1978–2021
- Notable work: Laag, Khwahish
- Awards: PTV Award for 'Best Actor' in 2002

Sohail Asghar (05 November 1954 – 13 November 2021) was a Pakistani TV, film and theater actor.

== Career ==
Sohail was born in Multan, Pakistan in 1954. After completing his education he joined Radio Pakistan, Lahore. He worked as a radio jockey from 1978 to 1988. He was introduced to television in the TV drama Raat at PTV Lahore by director Nusrat Thakur. He appeared in his first movie, Murad, in 2003. He received an award for Outstanding Performance at the 1st Indus Drama Awards for this film.

== Awards and recognition ==
He received the PTV Award 'Best Actor' award for 2002 at the 12th PTV Awards ceremony organized to mark 40 years of Pakistan Television.

== Death and legacy ==
Sohail Asghar died after being ill for a year and a half before his death. He was hospitalized for a week and went through a major stomach surgery in a hospital in Lahore but died on 13 November 2021, aged 67.

The death of the veteran actor was mourned by National Council of the Arts, National Institute of Folk and Traditional Heritage as well as the Lok Virsa Museum staff in Pakistan.

== Filmography ==
- Murad (2003) (his film debut)
- Mahnoor (2004)
- Victim of an Honor Killing (a British movie about honor killings)

== TV Dramas ==
- Khafa Khafa Zindagi (2018)
- Mere Khudaya (ARY Digital) (2018)
- Teri Meri Love Story (2016)
- Aap ki Kaneez (2014)
- Ek Hatheli Pe Hina Ek Hatheli Pe Lahoo (2011)
- Aashti (2009)
- Chaudhavin Raat (2002) (PTV)
- Laag as Kaku Lala (1998)
- Pyas (1989) (PTV)
- Khuwahish (1993)
- Alao (1994)
- Chand Grehan (1995) (PTV)
- Manchalay Ka Sauda (PTV)
- Kajal Ghar (PTV)
- Khuda Ki Basti (Geo TV Production)

== Awards ==
Ceremony	Category	Project	Result
PTV Award	Best TV Actor	Chaudhavin Raat (2002)	Won
4th Lux Style Awards	Best TV Actor (Terrestrial)	Mah-e-Neem Shab	Nominated
6th Lux Style Awards	Best TV Actor (Satellite)	Dohri	Nominated
7th Lux Style Awards	Best TV Actor (Satellite)	Vanee	Nominated
