= Najeebullah Anjum =

Pakistani film and TV actor

Najeebullah Anjum (born 1955) is a Pakistani film and TV actor. He was born and raised in Peshawar, attending Forward High School and later graduating from Edwardes High School.

During his career, Anjum appeared in 500 television plays for Pakistan Television Corporation by 2007.

Anjum has also worked in a few films. His debut film was Rauf Khalid's 2003 period drama Laaj. He also acted in Shoaib Mansoor's 2007 contemporary drama Khuda Ke Liye.

== Filmography ==
- Laaj (2003)
- Khuda Ke Liye (2007)
- Revenge of the Worthless (2015)

== Awards ==
Anjum was awarded Pride of Performance, best PTV actor in 1986 and the Medal of Excellence in 2005.

== See also ==
- List of Lollywood actors
