= Waris (serial) =

- Title screen
- Written by: Amjad Islam Amjad
- Directed by: Nusrat Thakur; Ghazanfer Ali
- Starring: Abid Ali; Mehboob Alam; Munawar Saeed; Uzma Gillani; Samina Ahmad; Firdous Jamal; Shujaat Hashmi; Aurangzeb Leghari; Ghayyur Akhtar; Nighat Butt; Tahira Naqvi; Agha Sikandar; Jeevan Sultan; Talat Siddiqui; Iqbal Bahu; Malik Anokha; Rina
- Country of origin: Pakistan
- Original language: Urdu
- No. of episodes: 21

Original release
- Network: Pakistan Television Corporation
- Release: 29 December 1979 – 22 March 1980

Waris (Urdu: وارث) is a Pakistani television drama serial created by PTV, written by Amjad Islam Amjad, and directed by Ghazanfer Ali and Nusrat Thakur.

The first of the 21 episodes was aired from PTV Lahore on Saturday 29 December 1979 and the last on 22 March 1980 and was an acclaimed mega hit. https://youtube.com/playlist?list=PLj-INzURwZ47eoyu03xgsEN2McrtfB8VZ&si=wDHnayONP3vt6ZKO

== Plot ==
A Punjabi feudal (zamindar), Chaudhry (Note: The name Chaudhary also means a feudal lord.) Hashmat rules his fiefdom, Sikandarpur, with an iron grip. Along with his son Chaudhry Yaqub and two grandsons Chaudhry Anwar Ali and Chaudhry Niaz Ali (sons of his deceased son, Chaudhry Ghulam Ali), he struggles to hold on to Sikanderpur, which is the proposed site for a dam.

The two grandsons are constantly at loggerheads. The younger one, Chaudhry Anwar Ali is a prodigal scion of a feudal family. He is also ruthless, like his grandfather, Chaudhry Hashmat. The older one, Chaudhry Niaz Ali wishes to escape to the big city, Lahore, but is trapped in the feudal web.

There is vicious intra-family feudal politics at play. Chaudhry Yaqub is eyeing the entire estate of his father Chaudhry Hashmat by attempting to pit Chaudhry Anwar against his older brother Chaudhry Niaz. His machinations are carried out by Mauladad, who is an employee of Chaudhry Anwar. Mauladad is a tough, wily guy employed by Chaudhry Anwar to carry out hit-jobs, abductions, etc.

Fateh Sher is an unknown guy, his true identity is revealed as the drama reaches its climax. Fateh Sher fled to Sikandarpur with his wife Zohra. Zohra was originally engaged to the older nephew of the Chaudhry of Ahmadpur, Hayat Muhammad. Another lead character, Dilawar is the younger nephew of Hayat Muhammad. Zohra's marriage with Fateh Sher causes strife in the village and they had to run for their lives. After moving to Sikandarpur, they start a new life and Fateh Sher assumes a new identity.

Meanwhile, a blood feud ensues between the families of Hayat Muhammad and Fateh Sher. In rural Punjabi culture, it is a huge insult for a man, if his fiancé marries someone else. To avenge this grave insult, Dilawar's older brother launches a failed attack on Fetah Sher's village, where police were lying in wait in anticipation of an attack. To save his older brother, Dilawar gives a false statement to the police saying he launched the attack and not his brother. For this (false) acknowledgement, Dilawar is sentenced to ten years in prison. While Dilawar is serving his term, his older brother goes out to seek and kill Fateh Sher. But before he can get to Fateh Sher, Fateh Sher kills him. These events catalyze a deep rage and hatred in Dilawar against Fateh Sher. Upon his release from prison, he only has one purpose in life - to seek out and kill Fateh Sher.

Fateh Sher was last spotted in Sikandarpur, the fiefdom of Chaudhry Hashmat. It is very difficult for any outsider to come to Sikandarpur without attracting the scrutiny of Chaudhry Hashmat and his servants. To get to Sikandarpur, Dilawar starts working as a servant for Chaudhry Yaqub in Lahore. When Chaudhry Hashmat visits his son Chaudhry Yaqub in Lahore to purchase a high-pedigree dog (Crystal) from Saulat Mirza, the latter turns down all offers, infuriating Chaudhry Hashmat who is not used to taking no for an answer. Seizing the opportunity to earn Chaudhry Hashmat's favor, Dilawar steals the prized dog, Crystal, from Saulat Mirza and brings it to Chaudhry Hashmat. This act endears Dilawar to Chaudhry Hashmat and lets Dilawar into Chaudhry Hashmat's inner circle of confidants and servants. Chaudhry Hashmat takes Dilawar with him to Sikandarpur.

Ironically, the first and only true friend Dilawar makes in Sikandarpur is Mauladad, who in reality is his nemesis Fateh Sher - the person Dilawar is seeking to find and kill.

== Cast ==
- Abid Ali as Dilawar
- Mehboob Alam as Chaudhry Hashmat Khan
- Uzma Gillani as Zakiya Ghulam Ali (widow of Chaudhry Ghulam Ali)
- Samina Ahmad as Sughra
- Firdous Jamal as Chaudhry Anwar Ali
- Ghayyur Akhtar as Chaudhry Hayat Muhammad
- Nighat Butt as Zubaida (Wife of Chaudhry Yaqub)
- Tahira Naqvi as Seemi
- Talat Siddiqui as Dilawar's mother
- Reena as Zuhran (Mauladad's wife)
- Munawar Saeed as Chaudhry Yaqub
- Shujaat Hashmi as Mauladad / Fateh Sher
- Aurangzeb Leghari as Chaudhry Niaz Ali
- Agha Sikandar as Farrukh
- Sajjad Kishwar as Sher Muhammad
- Muhammad Ayub as Master Ji
- Amanullah as Chheema Maachhi
- Iqbal Bahu as Folk singer
- Malik Anokha as Mengha (Chaudhry's servant)
