= Asghar Nadeem Syed =

Pakistani TV drama serial writer

Asghar Nadeem Syed (اصغر ندیم سید) (born 14 January 1950) is a Pakistani playwright, TV drama serial writer and poet. He has written dramas for the Pakistani state channel, PTV, as well as the privately owned Shalimar Television Network.

== Early life and career ==
Syed was born on 14 January 1950 in the city of Multan, Pakistan. He received his master's degree in Urdu language from the University of Punjab, Lahore and completed his PhD at Bahauddin Zakariya University in Multan. He is married and has three children; a son and two daughters. His son Syed Adeel Hassan is a British national who works for FTSE 100 businesses in the UK. Syed gets inspiration from his son to depict life in foreign lands. Syed is a family man with strong bonds with his son and daughters. Syed wrote the popular TV play Chand Grehan, an Urdu TV drama serial that was one of the highest rated dramas produced by STN, along with "Nijaat" and "Hawain," classic dramas from PTV. One of Syed's works, "Ghulam Gardish" was directed by Nusrat Thakur.

At one time, Asghar Nadeem Syed was a media consultant at the Pakistan Television Corporation.

His dramas depict the social injustices in the society. He has written plays depicting the feudal culture in rural Sindh, exploitation of women, the oligarchic structure in Pakistan comprising politicians, feudals, media moguls and the bureaucracy.

In January 2014, he was wounded by unknown assailants in a gun attack in Lahore while he was returning home from his job as head of the Department of Television, Film and Theatre at Beaconhouse National University in Lahore. The assailants shot at his car when he was near Shaukat Khanum Hospital.

Syed has a total of 36 years of teaching experience.

== TV plays ==
- Pyas (1989) (PTV)
- Khuwahish (1993) (aired on PTV)
- Nijaat (1993) (aired on PTV)
- Alao (1994) (aired on PTV)
- Chand Grehan (1995) (aired on Shalimar Television Network)
- Maigh Malhar (1995) (NTM)
- Hawain (1997) (PTV)
- Ghulam Gardish (1998) (PTV)
- Riyasat (2005) (aired on Geo TV)
- Khuda Zameen Se Gaya Nahin (2009) (aired on PTV)
- Bol Meri Machli (aired on Geo TV from 2009-2010)
- Tum Ho Ke Chup (2011) (aired on Geo TV)
- Dil Tou Bhatkay Ga (2012) (aired on Geo TV)
- Jaan'nisar (2016–17) (aired on A-Plus Entertainment)
- Aik Bond Zindagi (2018) (aired on A-Plus Entertainment)

== Literary activities ==
In 2013, he served on the Board of Governors of Pakistan Academy of Letters, an institution of Pakistani scholars and writers. In November 2020, he was appointed as one of the directors of Pakistan Television under the chairmanship of Mr. Naeem Bokhari.

== Awards and recognition ==
- He won Best Writer Nigar Award for drama Pyas in 1989.
- He won Best Writer Award at 9th PTV Awards in 1998
- Pride of Performance Award by the President of Pakistan in 2006
- Pakistan Television Corporation Award for Best Writer

=== Lux Style Awards ===
Ceremony	Category	Project	Result
9th Lux Style Awards	Best Television Writer	Khuda Zameen Se Gaya Nahi	Won
10th Lux Style Awards	Best Television Writer	Bol Meri Machli	Nominated

== Books ==
=== Poetry Collections ===
- Tarz‑e‑Ehsas (طرزِ احساس; *Style of Feeling*) (1988)

A collection of Urdu poems exploring emotional landscapes and introspection, showcasing Syed’s lyrical voice in early poetic form.

- Aadhe Chaand Ki Raat (آدھے چاند کی رات; *Mid‑Moon Night*) (1993)

A volume of evocative ghazals and nazms capturing themes of longing, romance, and night‑time reflection.

- Adhuri Kulliyat (ادھوری کلیات; *Incomplete Collected Works*) (2014)

A curated compilation of selected poems from Syed’s earlier work, including unpublished and rare pieces.

- Jahanabad Ki Galiyan (جہاں آباد کی گلیاں; *Streets of Jahanabad*) (2023)

Recent poems centered on urban life, nostalgia, and cultural change in old Lahore neighborhoods.

=== Short Fiction ===
- Kahani Mujhe Mili (کہانی مجھے ملی; *I Found a Story*) (2017)

A collection of ten short stories reflecting social issues, human struggles, and reflective narratives.

=== Character Sketches ===
- Phirta Hai Falak Barson (پھرتا ہے فلک برسوں; *The Sky Wanders for Years*) (2022)

A series of vivid character sketches (khaakay) portraying personalities from various walks of life.

=== Literary Criticism ===
- Syed Waqar Azeem: Shakhsiyat Aur Fun (سید وقار عظیم: شخصیت اور فن; *Syed Waqar Azeem: Personality and Art*) (2017)

A critical study on noted literary figure Syed Waqar Azeem, analyzing his life, works, and stylistic contributions.

=== Play & Script Anthologies ===
- Dasht‑e‑Imkaan (دشتِ امکان; *Desert of Possibilities*)

A collection of dramatic writings and scripts, highlighting Syed’s contribution to Urdu drama.

- Tooti Hui Tanaab Udhar (ٹوٹی ہوئی تناب ادھر; *The Rope is Broken Over There*) (2019)

A dramatic text or play centering on social and psychological tension, with symbolic undertones.

=== Other Works ===
- Zameen‑Zaad Ka Ufaq (زمین زاد کا اُفق; *Horizon Born of the Earth*)

Likely a poetry or reflection-based work; exact category and publication date unspecified.
