= Anokha Daaj =

1981 Pakistani film by Aslam Dar

- Anokha Daj
- Directed by: Aslam Dar; Murtaza Qureshi
- Story by: Sheikh Iqbal
- Produced by: Aslam Dar; Qamar Butt
- Starring: Sultan Rahi; Asiya; Waheed Murad; Sabiha Khanum; Ilyas Kashmiri; Shehla Gill; Tani Begum; Durdana Rehman; Sheikh Iqbal; Altaf Khan
- Narrated by: S. M. Siddiq
- Cinematography: Sadiq Moti
- Edited by: Khurshad Ahmad
- Music by: Master Rafiq Ali; Lyricist: Waris Ludhianvi; Singers: Mehnaz; Afshan
- Distributed by: AQ films
- Release date: 27 February 1981 (Pakistan)
- Running time: 160 minutes
- Country: Pakistan
- Language: Punjabi

Anokha Daaj Punjabi film (انوکھا داج) is a 1981 Pakistani drama film.

Directed and produced by Aslam Dar, the film stars Sultan Rahi, Aasia, Waheed Murad, Sabiha Khanum and Sheikh Iqbal.

== Cast ==
- Sultan Rahi
- Asiya
- Durdana Rehman
- Waheed Murad
- Sabiha Khanum
- Ilyas Kashmiri
- Tani Begum
- Sheikh Iqbal
- Nasrullah Butt
- Rehan
- Saqi
- Altaf Hussain
- Shehla Gill
- Taya Barkat
- Fazal Haq
- Abbu Shah
- Rafiq

== Track list ==
The soundtrack was composed by the musician Master Rafiq Ali, with lyrics by Waris Ludhianvi and sung by Mehnaz and Afshan.

#	Title	Singer(s)
1	"Yaar Ve Assan Terey Nal Laiyan"	Mehnaz
2	"Rangi Gayi We Main Rungi Gayi"	Mehnaz
3	"Nee Tainu Kuriye Mubarkan"	Afshan, Shazia
4	"Ho Dagga Kass Ke Dhol Noon"	Rubina Badar
5	"Dus Rabba Jug Wich Dhiyaan"	Mehnaz
6	"Tu Tay Akhyaasee Lagian Na"	Mehnaz

== Accolades ==
Year	Award	Category	Result	Recipients and nominees	Ref.
1985	Shabab Memorial Awards	Best Supporting Actor	Won	Waheed Murad	

== Box office ==
Anokha Daaj got a status of a platinum jubilee film at box office.
