= Wehshi Daku =

1982 film

- Directed by: Ali Tahir
- Written by: Iftikhar Shahid
- Produced by: Nisar Ali Shah; Ateeq Tufail
- Starring: Sultan Rahi; Musarrat Shaheen; Nazli; Usman Peerzada; Ali Ejaz; Sheikh Iqbal; Jaggi Malik; Seema; Khalid Saleem Mota; Mehboob Alam; Irfan Khoosat; Shehla Gill
- Cinematography: Nabi Ahmed; S. Shakoor
- Music by: Wajahat Attre
- Production company: N A Pictures
- Distributed by: International Film Makers
- Release date: 12 February 1982 (Pakistan)
- Country: Pakistan
- Language: Punjabi

Wehshi Daku (Punjabi) is a 1982 Pakistani, action and a drama film directed by Ali Tahir.

== Cast ==
- Sultan Rahi
- Musarrat Shaheen
- Nazli
- Aasia
- Usman Peerzada
- Ali Ejaz
- Shehla Gill
- Sheikh Iqbal
- Seema
- Khalid Saleem Mota
- Mehboob Alam
- Irfan Khoosat

== Film release ==
This film was released on 12 February 1982.

== Music ==
Film music was by Wajahat Attre.
