= Rahain =

1998 Pakistani television serial

- Title screen
- Based on: Taawan Taawan Tara by Mansha Yaad
- Written by: Mansha Yaad
- Directed by: Tariq Jameel
- Country of origin: Pakistan
- Original languages: Urdu; Punjabi
- No. of episodes: 17

Original release
- Network: Pakistan Television Corporation
- Release: 1998 – 1998

Rahain is a Pakistani television serial written and directed for Pakistan Television Corporation by Mansha Yaad and Tariq Jameel respectively. It was broadcast from PTV's Lahore centre and consists of seventeen episodes. Sources differ on whether the serial first aired in 1998 or 1999. (Note: The PTV official portal record 1998 as the broadcast year, while several secondary sources, give 1999.)

The serial is based on the Punjabi novel Taawan Taawan Tara by Mansha Yaad, though Yaad later maintained that the television serial Raahain was conceived as an independent project distinct from the novel. The story examines social issues across rural and urban settings in Pakistan, including illiteracy, injustice, legal disputes, and intergenerational family conflict.

== Plot ==
The serial follows multiple interconnected storylines set across village and city environments in Punjab. A kabaddi player loses his leg during a match; a young woman's life is altered after she leaves home; a young man travels to the city to pursue an education; and a man who is in love with a woman later commits criminal acts. The narrative traces the consequences of illiteracy, social injustice, cultural conflict, and family disputes across generations.

== Cast ==
- Tauqeer Nasir as Jura Bhatti
- Saleem Sheikh as Khalid
- Habib-ur-Rehman as Wakeel Sahib
- Ghayyur Akhtar as Chaudhary Akbar
- Riaz Mahmood as Hakeem
- Sumaira Yousaf as Farah
- Naima Khan as Aapa
- Naseem Vicky as Falak Sher
- Masood Akhtar as Malik Murad Ali
- Bushra Chaudhary as Farzana
- Sarfraz Ansari as Chaanda Mochi
- Sarfraz Rana as Sarwar
- Sakhawat Naz as Mirasi
- Tasneem Haiderani as Waris
- Rubina Naz as Shehnaz
- Salma Khan as Satto Kumhari
- Aslam Shaheen as Ditta Marasi
- Dildar as Thanedar
- Farooq Asghar as Mooda
- Abdul Rasheed as Mian Abdul
- Munir Narang as Gamu
- Najma Begum as Khalid's mother
- Farzeen as Nujji Suniari
- Jazba Sultan as Fatima
- Saima Saleem as Taaji
- Akhtar Shad as Karam Deen Kumhar
- Asif Iqbal as Jeeru
- Hina as Rizwana
- Anjum Ahmed as Daari
- Mudassar Qadeer as Sain Yunus
- Tariq Mustafa as Munshi Faqir Muhammad
- Saeed Sheikh as Malik Murad's Munshi
- Tipu Sultan as Hameed
- Rauf Ramooz as Intesar
- Tahira Imam as Intesar's bhabbi
- Hamid Mehmood as Kubba Julaha

== Production ==
The serial was produced and directed by Tariq Jameel, a television director and producer at PTV. The screenplay was written by Mansha Yaad, who also authored the source novel. Filming took place partly in a village setting and partly in Lahore.

== Reception ==
Mansha Yaad received a PTV award in connection with the serial, according to an obituary published by Dawn. (Note: The Dawn obituary states the PTV award was received "in 1988"; this appears to be a typographical error in the source, as the serial was produced and broadcast in 1998 or 1999. The date cannot be independently verified from other reliable sources.) Writing in the Daily Times, Amjad Parvez noted that critic and writer Intizar Hussain found parallels between Mansha Yaad's rural characterisation in the serial and the work of Krishan Chander.
