= Mahnoor =

- Logo
- Genre: Romance; Musical; Drama
- Written by: Zafar Mairaj
- Directed by: Adnan Wai Qureshi
- Starring: Savera Nadeem; Sara Loren; Ayub Khoso; Sohail Asghar; Kamran Jillani; Akbar Subhani; Afshan Qureshi.
- Theme music composer: Javed Allahditta
- Opening theme: Ankhon K Ratjago by Mehnaz
- Composer: Mohsin Allah Dittah
- Country of origin: United Kingdom
- Original languages: Urdu; Hindi with English translations

Production
- Executive producer: Raheel Rao (Geo TV)
- Producers: Kamran Qureshi; Nadeem J. (Geo TV)
- Production locations: Karachi, Pakistan
- Cinematography: Naeem Ahmad
- Editor: Imran Wai Qureshi
- Running time: 102 minutes

Original release
- Network: GEO TV UK, USA & Pakistan
- Release: 2004

Mahnoor (Urdu: ماه نور) is a Pakistani musical film directed by Adnan Wai Qureshi, written by Zafar Mairaj and produced by Kamran Qureshi and Nadeem J.

It is a story of a young girl, who was brought up in the red light district of town and was taught to dance and sing. She was famous for her voice and beauty. One day she went outside the barn to dance at a birthday party and there after watching the bond of a mother and child, she wished to become a mother.

== Plot ==
Kajal (Savera Nadeem), a famous professional eastern classical singer and dancer, was invited to perform at a birthday party. She observed the feeling of a mother for a child and wished to become a mother.

Kajal's foster mother (Afshan Qureshi) didn't want her to have a baby, but she insisted and in the end the mother made a deal with Sikander Ali Khan (Ayub Khoso) and decided to sell her Nath Utrai(virginity).

Her musician, Wafa (Sohail Asghar), told Kajal about her mother's plan and they both ran away leaving the barn in the dark. They moved to another city, got married and started a new life. After some time they had a baby girl, whom they named Mahnoor (moonlight) as they thought she came into the world to enlighten their life.

Mahnoor (Sara Loren) liked a boy Rohail (Kamran Jillani) who loved her very much and wanted to marry her. But her mother wanted her to study as much as she could. The girl shared her feelings with her father who supported her and convinced his wife.

Mahnoor won first prize in a college singing contest and was approached by a music company but her mother didn't give her permission. On Mahnoor's refusal, the owner of the music company (Hassan Shaheed Mirza) asked Mahnoor, why her mother didn't like her singing when she herself was very famous for her own singing? Mahnoor who was not aware of her parents' past was a little surprised by this news.

The college function story was covered by the newspaper and Firdos Bai tracked them through that news. Firdos Bai demanded Kajal to give Mahnoor for prostitution and singing at her business place to compensate for the loss she had suffered due to Kajal and Wafa's leaving the barn.

Her father shared the whole story of their past with Mahnoor. Kajal was not prepared to let her daughter go to that place where she left once. Rather she preferred to go herself with Firdos Bai. Mahnoor after knowing the truth about her parents, helped them along with her fiancé. They ordered Firdos and her pimp Gullo (Akbar Subhani) to leave the house or they will contact police and saved her mother.

== Cast ==
- Savera Nadeem as Kajal Bai
- Sara Loren as Mahnoor
- Ayub Khoso as Sikandar Ali Khan
- Sohail Asghar as Ustaad Wafa
- Kamran Jillani as Rohail
- Akbar Subhani as Gullo
- Afshan Qureshi as Firdos Bai
- Hassan Shaheed Mirza as Head of music company
- Hareem Qureshi as Birthday girl

== Soundtrack ==
External videos
- Trailer of Mahnoor

There are four situational songs in this serial. Qawwali and music videos were recorded on original locations. The songs were composed by Javed and Mohsin Allahditta, lyricists was M Nasir and Choreography by Farukh Darbar.

Tracklist
No.	Title	Singer(s)	Length
1.	"Ankhon k Ratjago"	Mehnaz	5:45
2.	"Sargam Me Sur"	Saima Iqbal	02:20
3.	"Dil Ke Sada"	Mohsin Allah Dittah	5:44
4.	"Sab Chor K"	Iqbal Shad Qawal	3:50
