= Laaj (film) =

- Directed by: A. Rauf Khalid
- Written by: A. Rauf Khalid
- Produced by: A. Rauf Khalid; Ashfaq Hussain; Bagar Naqvi
- Starring: Zara Sheikh; Nirma; Imran Khan; Resham; Talat Hussain
- Cinematography: Waqar Bukhari
- Edited by: Zulfiqar Zulfi
- Music by: Amjad Bobby
- Release date: 26 November 2003
- Country: Pakistan
- Language: Urdu

Laaj (Urdu: لاج) is a 2003 Pakistani Urdu language film written and directed by Rauf Khalid. The film features Zara Sheikh and Imran Khan in lead roles. Film's music is composed by Amjad Bobby.

== Plot ==
The story is set in old British Raj (later IND-PAK )under British rule, in the 1920s. The warring Pathans of the North West region of India had become more aggressive towards the ruling Britain. The Fakir of Ippy was already a living legend before he started a war that was fought over the love of a couple that knew no bounds of religion, cast, color or language.

A wealthy Hindu girl named Ram Kori, using the alias Chand Bibi, runs away from her home with a Pathan boy Noor Ali Khan and meets a mystic Muslim leader called the 'Fakir of Ippy'. The Fakir marries Noor Ali Khan and Ram Kori after she accepts Islam and agrees to be renamed as Noor Jahan.

The influential and rich Hindus of the area go to the British Court run by an English Political Agent involved in both the executive and the judiciary. The agent is, in actuality, against the warring Pathans, and he intends to teach them a lesson. In the court, the political agent decides against the couple's case. Since Noor Jahan had become a Muslim, she was to be tried under Muslim Law, where a girl of fourteen years is adult and can choose her husband. However, according to the political agent's decision, since under the English Law a girl is considered minor till she reaches the age of eighteen, both her acceptance of Islam as well as her marriage are made void.

The Muslim lawyers representing Noor Jahan insisted that the court also decree that the girl will not be taken away from the city Bannu, which was granted. However, Noor Jahan was secretly taken away to Hoshiarpur where the girl's parents lived. Noor Ali Khan, at the behest of the faqir, goes to Hoshiarpur. He exchanges hot words with Noor Jahan's family, resulting in his stabbing a man and then his arrest. He eventually broke out of the jail, picked up Noor Jahan and come back to Waziristan area.

The British, after a failed dialogue, attack the village. The Fakir, unhappy with the attack, wages a holy war against the English. Backed by German aid, he starts Guerilla warfare against the British.

== Cast ==
- Zara Sheikh
- Imran Khan
- Nirma
- Resham
- Talat Hussain
- Najeebullah Anjum
- Rashid Mehmood
- Usman Mughal
- Afshan Qureshi
- Nayyar Ejaz
- James Kavaz
- Pat Kelman
- Abdul Mannan as captain

== Awards and recognition ==
Ceremony	Category	Recipient	Result
3rd Lux Style Awards	Best Film Director	Rauf Khalid	Nominated
3rd Lux Style Awards	Best Film Actor	Talat Hussain	Nominated
3rd Lux Style Awards	Best Film Actress	Zara Sheikh	Won
3rd Lux Style Awards	Best Film Actress	Resham	Nominated

- National Film Awards (film Laaj won 4 awards)

== See also ==
- List of Urdu-language films
