= Mutthi Bhar Chawal =

1978 film

- Directed by: Sangeeta
- Written by: Iqbal Rizvi
- Screenplay by: Rajinder Singh Bedi
- Story by: Rajinder Singh Bedi
- Based on: Ek Chadar Maili Si by Rajinder Singh Bedi
- Starring: Nadeem Baig; Kaveeta; Rahat Kazmi; Shehla Gill; Ghulam Mohiuddin
- Cinematography: Azhar Burki
- Edited by: Z.A. Zulfi
- Music by: Kamal Ahmed
- Release date: 16 June 1978
- Country: Pakistan
- Language: Urdu

Mutthi Bhar Chawal (A Fistful of Rice) is a 1978 Pakistani classical Urdu film based on Rajinder Singh Bedi's novel Ek Chaadar Maili Si. Directed by Sangeeta, with musical composition by Kamal Ahmed.

It is one of the greatest hits of Sangeeta and debut film of Syed Noor as a screenwriter.

The film is about rural life in Pakistan and a family's struggle to survive after the head of the household dies and his wife is widowed. It is one of the Pakistani films with the maximum number of awards won, including six Nigar Awards. It made the list of the 10 best Pakistani cinema films created by a well-known Pakistani film critic and published by BBC Urdu.

== Plot ==
A Sikh woman Rani/Rano lives in East Punjab with her in-laws. When Rano suddenly becomes widowed after her husband dies in a horse and carriage accident, she struggles to raise her children. Her in-laws come with a marriage proposal and forcibly ask her to marry Rano's brother-in-law Mangal who is in love with a vegetable seller's daughter, Lajjo and is much younger than her and who always saw her as a sister-in-law.

== Cast ==
- Nadeem Baig as Mangal
- Shehla Gill as Rano's daughter
- Sangeeta as Rano
- Ghulam Mohiuddin as Ghulam Mohi-Vo-Din
- Kaveeta as Lajjo
- Rahat Kazmi

== Production ==
The film was shot at Bari Studios and Evernew Studio of Lahore.

== Legacy ==
Actor Rahat Kazmi named Mutthi Bhar Chawal as his favourite film. In 2020, the film was included among BBC Urdu's "Ten best films of Pakistani cinema", selected by critic Aijaz Gul.

=== Remake ===
The film was remade as a television series with same title, directed by Sangeeta and aired in 2008.

== Awards and nominations ==
Year	Award	Category	Awardee	Nominated work	Result	Ref.
1978	Nigar Awards	Best film	Mutthi Bhar Chawal	Mutthi Bhar Chawal	Won	
1978	Nigar Awards	Best Director	Sangeeta	Mutthi Bhar Chawal	Won	
1978	Nigar Awards	Best Actress	Sangeeta	Mutthi Bhar Chawal	Won	
1978	Nigar Awards	Best Editing	Z.A. Zulfi	Mutthi Bhar Chawal	Won	
1978	Nigar Awards	Best Supporting Actress	Shehla Gill	Mutthi Bhar Chawal	Won	
1978	Nigar Awards	Best Special Performance	Ghulam Mohiuddin	Mutthi Bhar Chawal	Won	
