= Alao (TV series) =

Pakistani television series

- Title screen
- الاؤ
- Genre: Youth; Drama
- Written by: Asghar Nadeem Syed
- Directed by: Shaukat Zain-ul-Abideen
- Starring: Nabeel; Uzma Gillani; Madeeha Gauhar; Sohail Asghar
- Country of origin: Pakistan
- Original language: Urdu
- No. of seasons: 1
- No. of episodes: 7

Production
- Producer: Shaukat Zain-ul-Abideen

Original release
- Network: PTV
- Release: 1994 – 1994

Alao (Urdu: الاؤ, lit. 'Bonfire') is a 1994 Pakistani television series. Asghar Nadeem Syed wrote it; Shaukat Zain-ul-Abideen produced and directed.

== Synopsis ==
The series deals with social issues around marriage, divorce among them. Hajra has just been released from jail and is trying to track down her daughter, Chandi. Elsewhere, Irshad — a wealthy woman with a taste for expensive things — has no idea that her son Daniyal has fallen in with the wrong crowd and is on his way to becoming a drug addict.

== Cast ==
- Nabeel as Daniyal
- Uzma Gillani as Hajra
- Madeeha Gauhar as Irshad
- Seemi Zaidi as Chandi
- Sohail Asghar as Ghunghru
- Saiqa as Suhani Begum
- Khalid Butt as the Advocate
- Jameel Fakhri as the Thekedar
- Ismat Tahira as Begum Karim
- Munawar Saeed as Chaudhary Anwar
- Abid Khan as Rashid
- Farooq Butt as the student leader
- Asif Alvi as Aamir
- Saeed Yousaf as Bobby
- Ali Haider as Waqas
- Waseem Haider as Rashid
- Altaf Ur Rehman as Hafiz Karim
- Mona Victor as Nanni
- Sarfraz Sial as the servant
- Nazar Abbas as Gogi
- Karim Multani as Nashi
- Munir Zareef as Tunda
- Hasan Zia as Jeda
- Qaiser Rafiq as Jamil
- Javed Babar as Doctor 1
- Kazim Raza as Doctor 2
- Shubnam Kanwal as the nurse
- Abdul Wahid as the A.S.I.
- Gul Zareen as the SHO
- Majid Zareef as the jeweller
- Hamid Mehmood as the teacher
- Meher-Un-Nisa as Gully
- Anil Chaudhary as the medical supervisor
