= Society Girl (1976 film) =

1976 film

- Directed by: Sangeeta
- Written by: Syed Noor
- Produced by: Syed Raza Ali Rizvi
- Starring: Sangeeta; Kaveeta; Ghulam Mohiuddin; Nisho
- Edited by: A. Saeed
- Music by: Nazir Ali
- Production company: Evernew Studios
- Release date: 16 April 1976
- Running time: 137 minutes
- Country: Pakistan
- Language: Urdu

Society Girl is a 1976 Pakistani drama film, directed by Sangeeta and written by Syed Noor. The film is produced by Azam J Irani, with music by Nazir Ali and song lyrics by Tasleem Fazli. The film stars Sangeeta, Ghulam Mohiuddin, Kaveeta, Aslam Pervaiz, and Nisho. Sangeeta won a Special Nigar Award for directing this commercially successful film.

== Cast ==
- Sangeeta as Julie
- Ghulam Mohiuddin as Asif
- Kaveeta as Mona
- Qavi Khan as Doctor
- Aslam Pervaiz as Seth
- Bahar Begum as Mummy
- Nisho as Shakeela
- Saqi
- Ibrahim Nafees

== Soundtrack ==
The film music was composed by Nazir Ali:

1. Tum Jaisi Bhi Ho – Mehdi Hassan
2. Tere Qadmon Men Bikhar Jane (Happy) – Noor Jahan
3. Happy Christmas To You – Nahid Akhtar & others
4. Andaz Wohi Apnaya Hay Teray Dil Ko Pasand Jo Aa Jaye - Nahid Akhtar

== Reception ==
Society Girl was a critical and commercial success. The success of the film established Sangeeta as one of the leading directors of Pakistani cinema.

== Awards ==
Nigar Awards

- Special Award - Sangeeta
- Best Supporting Actress - Kaveeta
- Best Editing - A. Saeed
