= Kajal Ghar =

Pakistani television drama serial

- کاجل گھر
- Genre: TV drama
- Written by: Khalid Ahmad
- Directed by: Muhammad Saleem Tahir
- Country of origin: Pakistan
- Original languages: Urdu, Punjabi
- No. of episodes: 13

Production
- Production company: PTV

Original release
- Network: PTV
- Release: 9 March 2001 – June 2001

Kajal Ghar (lit. 'House of Kohl') is a 13-episode Pakistani television drama serial produced and broadcast by Pakistan Television. Directed by Saleem Tahir and written by Khalid Ahmad, the drama was originally broadcast on PTV in 2001.

== Plot ==
Set against Punjab's rustic rural backdrop with glimpses of urban life, the drama revolves around Chaudhary Riyasat Ali, the tyrannical head of Feroza village. His reign of terror plagues numerous families and ultimately tears his own home apart. The conflict escalates when his city-bred son, Shaukat, takes up his father-in-law's dream of building a mosque and madrasa in the village, sparking fierce opposition from the tyrant. Shaukat later returns for the foundation stone laying ceremony of the mosque, accompanied by Sufi Baqir Ali—whom Chaudhary had previously exiled from the village—the Sufi's own son, Asad, and others. Enraged by their arrival, Chaudhary opens fire, shooting and injuring Sufi Baqir Ali's son. The narrative culminates in Chaudhary's downfall, as he is killed by his own loyal servant, Lakhoo.

== Cast and characters ==
Played by	Character
Sohail Ahmed	Chaudhary Riyasat Ali
Sohail Asghar	Sufi Baqir Ali
Saleem Sheikh	Shaukat Ali
Asim Bukhari	Hakeem Abdullah Karyalay Walay
Khalid Butt	Khursheed Munawar
Iqbal Bahu	Lok Gulukaar Iqbal
Tani Begum	Producer
Riaz Mahmood	Riaz
Rashid Mahmood	Lakhoo
Khursheed Shaukat	Seth Yousaf
Rasheed Ali	Allah Ditta
Zara Akbar	Shehreena
Mariam Baloch	Zeba
Khawaja Saleem	Diwana
Mohsin Gilani	DSP Ashraf
Raza William	DSP
Javaid Iqbal	Thanedar Safdar Khan
Naseem Abbas	Thanedar Inspector Gul
Saeed Sheikh	Hawaldar Shah Ji
Samina Butt	Razia
Razia Malik	Razia
Sana Raheem	Fatima
Tasneem Kausar	Ghulam Bibi
Najma Begum	Bantay
Rabia Tabassum	Sakeena
Roohi Khan	Reshma
Neelam Bhatti	Neelam
Sadaf Khan	Zareena
Sohni	Sara
Akhtar Shad	Doctor Maalik
M Shareef	Siddiq Anwar
Munir Narang	Karinda
Sultan Raza	Baba Babar
Khurram Rana	Asad
Abid Qureshi	Abid Mochi
Benazir Awan	Dinoo
Zahid Qureshi	Feeqa Taili (Rafiq)
Jahangir Khan	Naveed
Aslam Malik	Aslam
Wahaj Ahmed	Kazim Sajjad
Ghulam Noor	Cleric
Abdul Sattar	Chaprasi
Munir Zareef	Munshi
Nazeer Khan	Munshi Siraj Din
Asim Jamil	Karinda
Nazeer Anjum	Jeera
Ghulam Ahmad	Basheera
Khalid Sidiqui	Nazeera
Anjum Malik	Dehati
Ali Shair	Kaka
Khursheed Ali	Phajja (Fazal Din)
Abid Zafar	Railway Ticket Seller

== Production and reception ==
The serial was produced at PTV Lahore Center, which was renowned for creating critically acclaimed social dramas during the 1980s and 1990s. Directed by Saleem Tahir, the play received widespread appreciation for its strong dialogue delivery, stellar performances, and authentic cultural representation. The performance of Sohail Asghar and Sohail Ahmed was particularly lauded by critics and viewers alike, cementing their status as some of the finest character actors of Pakistan.
