= Silsila (disambiguation) =

Silsila (also transliterated as Silsilah, Silsileh, Silsilay, Selseleh, Selsele, etc.) is an Arabic term meaning "chain", "lineage".

Silsila may also refer to:

- Silsila (1981 film), a Bollywood film starring Amitabh Bachchan, Rekha and Jaya Bhaduri, with music by Shiv–Hari and lyrics by Javed Akhtar.
- Silsila (1987 film), a Pakistani Punjabi-language film
- Silsilay, a Pakistani TV series
- Silsiilay, a 2005 Hindi film
- Silsileh, Syria
- Selseleh County, Iran
- Gebel el-Silsila, an archaeological quarry site in Egypt

== See also ==
- Chain Gate (Jerusalem), Arabic Bab as-Silsila; western gate of Al-Aqsa compound. It gives its name to Chain Street, Tariq Bab as-Silsila
- Dome of the Chain, Arabic Qubbat as-Silsila; Al-Aqsa compound, Jerusalem
