= Bara Aadmi =

Pakistani film

- بڑا آدمی
- Directed by: Shamas Chodhary
- Written by: Riaz ur Rehman Saghar
- Produced by: M. Ashraf, Rehmatullah
- Starring: Muhammad Ali; Babra Sharif; Bindiya; Shahid; Roohi Bano; Durdana Rehman
- Music by: Nazir Ali
- Distributed by: A.R. Films
- Release date: 3 April 1981
- Running time: 150 minutes
- Country: Pakistan
- Language: Urdu

Bara Aadmi (Urdu: بڑا آدمی, lit. 'The Great Man') is a 1981 Pakistani film it was written by Riaz ur Rehman Saghar and directed by Shamas Chodhary it was produced by M. Ashraf and Rehmatullah. It stars Muhammad Ali, Babra Sharif, Bindiya, Shahid and Roohi Bano in leading roles.

== Plot ==
The story is about a (Muhammad) Azeem who is a poor man and is the eldest among his siblings; he takes care of his three younger sisters (Babra) Khalida, (Shehla) Sajida and (Durdana) Choti. He is engaged to (Bindiya) Safia who really loves him and wants to become his wife but her (Tamanna) mother is against the marriage. Later he and (Roohi) Shahida fall in loves and get married.

== Cast ==
- Muhammad Ali as Azeem
- Babra Sharif as Khalida
- Bindiya as Safia
- Shahid as Akhtar
- Roohi Bano as Shahida
- Shehla Gill as Sajida
- Nanha as Seth Imran
- Durdana Rehman as Choti
- Bahar Begum as Akhtar's mother
- Tamanna as Safia's mother
- Irfan Khoosat as Horsemen
- Jameel Fakhri as Horsemen rider
- Kemal Irani as Businessman

== Music ==
All lyrics are written by Riaz ur Rehman Saghar; all music is composed by Nazir Ali.

Bara Aadmi
| No. | Title | Singer (s) | Length |
|---|---|---|---|
| 1. | "Aane Wali Khushiyon Ka Ehsas Tou Hai" | Mehdi Hassan | 4:59 |
| 2. | "Daikh Idhar Aik Nazar Rooth Ke Jane Walay" | A. Nayyar & Mehnaz Begum | 3:57 |
| 3. | "Khush Rahay Duniya Mohabbat Se" | Rajab Ali | 4:39 |
| 4. | "Kuch Dair Tou Ruk Jao Barsat Ke Bahany" | Noor Jehan | 3:42 |

== Reception ==
The film was released on 3 April 1981, and it was a Golden Jubliee hit at the box office.
