= Aurat Raj =

- Directed by: Rangeela
- Produced by: Rangeela
- Starring: Rani Begum; Waheed Murad; Sultan Rahi; Usman Peerzada; Badar Munir; Nanha; Shehla Gill; Durdana Rehman
- Release date: 1979
- Country: Pakistan
- Language: Urdu

Aurat Raj (transl. Women's Rule) is one of the first Pakistani feminist films. Released in 1979, it was produced and directed by Rangeela. It is a satirical movie and was produced during the grim times for women under the conservative dictator, General Zia-ul-Haq's, socio-politically adverse dictatorship. Ahead of its time, it did not do well commercially at the box office.

The plot is based on a short story of Shaukat Thanvi, where oppressed women of Pakistan fight back by forming a feminist movement on roads and gain political power too. After gaining political power, in a satirical comedy fantasy scene, the female lead gives a taste of patriarchy and misogyny to Pakistani men by converting all of them into women a time. The fantastical scenarios, musical flights and comedic twists in the film have been hailed as interventionist tools and techniques that help to complicate and refashion the present by envisioning radical futures.

== Cast ==
- Rani
- Waheed Murad
- Sultan Rahi
- Chakori
- Naghma
- Shehla Gill
- Durdana Rehman
- Rangeela
- Yasmin Khan
- Badar Munir
- Asif Khan
- Usman Pirzada
- Khanum
- Waheeda Khan
- Surayya Khan
- Nazar
- Nanha
- Albela
- Khalid Saleem Mota
- Iqbal Durrani
- Irfan Khoost
- Ali Ahmed
- Ladla
- Chakram
- Saqi
- Shahnawaz
- (Guests: Yousuf Khan, Ali Ejaz, Durdana Rehman, Zahid Khan)

== Box office ==
The film was a "Silver Jubilee" hit, completing 45 weeks in theaters.

== See also ==
- Aurat March
- Me too movement in Pakistan
- Girls at Dhabas
