= Mishaal =

Pakistani television drama

- Genre: Drama
- Written by: Rauf Khalid
- Directed by: Rauf Khalid
- Country of origin: Pakistan
- Original language: Urdu
- No. of episodes: 17

Production
- Running time: ~45 minutes

Original release
- Network: PTV Home
- Release: 2008

Mishaal is a Pakistani television drama serial. It was aired by PTV in 17 episodes in 2008. It was written, produced and directed by Abdul Rauf Khalid.

== Plot ==
Mishaal is an Urdu language crime thriller TV drama serial. Mishaal lives with her brother, elder sister and their paternal uncle who is a strict disciplinarian. This makes her brother rebellious and he ends up running away from home and falls into the wrong hands. Will their family get their happy ending?

== Cast ==
- Saba Qamar as Fatima Mansoor
- Bilal Qureshi
- Anum Zahra (Strawbarro) as Mishaal
- Babar Ali as Rashid: Mishaal's elder brother
- Sana Zahra (Fruito) as Asifa
- Sunny Baba
- Waqas Majeed Khan
- Rashid Mehmood as Mishaal's father
- Ghulam Mohiyuddin as Mansoor Ali Khan
- Juggan Kazim as Dua
- Kinza Malik as Saifunnisa: Mishaal's elder sister
- Qavi Khan as Alam
