= Jatt Te Dogar =

1983 Pakistani film

- Directed by: Imtiaz Qureshi; Ejaz Aftab
- Written by: Imtiaz Qureshi
- Screenplay by: Imtiaz Qureshi
- Story by: Imtiaz Qureshi
- Produced by: Agha Imtiaz Ali Khan
- Starring: Sultan Rahi; Mustafa Qureshi; Mumtaz; Durdana Rehman; Adeeb; Sawan; Bahar; Rangeela; Agha Sikandar; Jaggi Malik; Nasrullah Butt; Altaf Khan; Changezi; Zahir Shah
- Narrated by: Agha Isfaq; Khurram Choudhry
- Cinematography: Riaz Butt
- Edited by: Rasheed Habib
- Music by: Wajahat Attre; Film song lyrics by Khawaja Pervez
- Production companies: Yaarana Productions; Vilties Sound System
- Distributed by: Sanay Color Laboratory
- Release date: April 29, 1983 (Pakistan)
- Running time: 170 minutes
- Country: Pakistan
- Language: Punjabi

Jatt Te Dogar (Punjabi: جٹ ڈوگر) is a 1983 Pakistan Punjabi language film, directed by Imtiaz Qureshi and produced by Agha Imtiaz Ali Khan. The film stars are actors Sultan Rahi, Mumtaz, Mustafa Qureshi and Adeeb.

== Cast ==
- Sultan Rahi - Achhu
- Mustafa Qureshi - Khanu
- Mumtaz - (love interest of Achhu)
- Durdana Rehman - (sister of achhu)
- Adeeb - (Jageerdar)
- Agha Sikandar - (Bau Sikandar)
- Changezi
- Rangeela - (Jeera)
- Altaf Khan
- Bahar Begum
- Khawar Abbas
- Sawan - (badro)
- Jaggi Malik
- Nasrullah Butt
- Zahir Shah
- Achi Khan
- Maqbool Anwar
- Raj Multani
- Booliay
- Musarrat Iman
- Sabahna
- Shaheen
- Jabroo
- Fida Malik
- Ali Nasir
- Insaf Waris - (child actor)
- Parvez Rahi - (child actor)
- Adeeb

== Track list ==
The music of the film is by famous musician Wajahat Attre. The lyrics are penned by Khawaja Pervez and the singers are Noor Jehan, Naheed Akhtar, Masood Rana.

#	Title	Singer(s)
1	"Aaya Jay Ulat Zamana"	Noor Jahan
2	"Jatta Khich Kalaijay Pei Gai"	Noor Jehan
3	"Shehran Wichon Shehar Suni Da Faisalabad Nirala"	Naheed Akhtar, Masood Rana
4	"Mar Jaawan Gi Je Toun Dil Todia"	Noor Jahan
5	"Kalli Main Kalli Koi Deway Tasalli"	Noor Jehan
6	"Tuttay Howe Dilan Nun Milan Wali Main"	Noor Jehan
7	"Qadar Ilam Di Tussi Ki Jano"	Noor Jehan
