= Permit (film) =

Pakistani action musical film

Permit پرمٹ
- Directed by: Imtiaz Quresh
- Written by: Imtiaz Quresh
- Produced by: Javed Ashraf
- Starring: Sultan Rahi; Aasia; Chakori; Afzal Ahmed; Sawan; Ilyas Kashmiri; Bahar; Aslam Pervaiz; Zahir Shah; Imrozia; Shehla Gill; Rangeela
- Cinematography: Riaz Butt
- Edited by: Zamir Qamir; Qasir Zamir
- Music by: Wajahat Attre
- Production company: Bari Studio
- Distributed by: Azad Productions
- Release date: 13 July 1979 (Pakistan)
- Running time: 157 minutes
- Country: Pakistan
- Language: Punjabi

Permit is a 1979 Pakistani Punjabi action musical film directed by Imtiaz Quraish and produced by Javed Ashraf.

== Cast ==
- Aasia
- Sultan Rahi
- Chakori
- Afzaal Ahmad
- Bahar
- Ilyas Kashmiri
- Sawan
- Shehla Gill
- Saqi
- Jaggi Malik
- Nasrullah Butt
- Zahir Shah
- Rangeela
- Khalid Saleem Mota
- Imrozia
- Aslam Pervaiz
- Anita
- Nazli
- Naureen

== Soundtrack ==
Permit

Soundtrack album by Wajahat Attre
- Released: 10 May 1979
- Recorded: Shalimar Reordering
- Studio: Bari Studio
- Genre: Film soundtrack
- Length: 18:47
- Language: Punjabi
- Label: EMI Music
- Director: Imtiaz Qureshi
- Producer: Javed Ashraf; Singers; Noor Jehan; Naheed Akhtar; Mehnaz; Akhlaq Ahmed; A. Nayyar
- Compiler: Khawaja Pervez & Waris Ludhyanvi

Wajahat Attre chronology
Maula Jat (1979)	Permit (1979)	Hathiar (1979)

Music of film Permit (Punjabi - 1979)
No.	Title	Lyrics	Music	Singer (s)	Length
1.	"Do Maamay, Bhanevan Sada Kalla Kalla.."	Waris Ludhyanvi	Wajahat Attre	Akhlaq Ahmed & A. Nayyar	3:41
2.	"Ho Gayi, Ho Gayi, Ho Gayi, Meray Yaar Di Zamanat Ho Gayi.."	Waris Ludhyanvi	Wajahat Attre	Naheed Akhtar	2:53
3.	"Pyar Na Karna, Dunya Kehndi, Jan Talli Tay Rakni.."	Khawaja Pervez	Wajahat Attre	Naheed Akhtar & Mehnaz	2:23
4.	"Way Main Sonay Di Nathli Pani A.."	Khawaja Pervez	Wajahat Attre	Noor Jehan	3:38
5.	"Way Teri Meri Akh Larh Gayi.."	Khawaja Pervez	Wajahat Attre	Mehnaz	3:20
6.	"Yaar Di Khatir Bhes Wataya, Main Gujri Ban Gayi, Way Gujra Teray Layi.."	Khawaja Pervez	Wajahat Attre	Noor Jehan	4:20
Total length:					18:47
