= Durdana Rehman =

Pakistani actress (born 1960)

- دردانہ رحمان
- Born: Durdana Rehman Begum; 10 December 1960 (age 65); Lahore, Pakistan
- Other name: The Screen Siren
- Education: University of Lahore
- Occupations: Actress; Singer; Model
- Years active: 1975–present
- Spouse: Aslam Dar (m. 1981; died 2014)
- Children: 2

Durdana Rehman is a Pakistani actress (born 10 December 1960). She was also known as The Screen Siren. She is known for her roles in Urdu and Punjabi films including Aurat Raj, Bara Aadmi, Anokha Daaj, Sher Mama, Silsila and Jhoomar.

== Early life ==
Rehman was born in Lahore at Pakistan and she completed her early education from Government Girls School later she completed her studies from University of Lahore.

== Career ==
Rehman made her debut as an actress in the 1975 Urdu film Paisa which was a silver jubilee film at the box office. She appeared in films Sayyan Anari, Baray Mian Deevanay, Khak Aur Khoon, Ab Ghar Janay Do, Aurat Raj, Dehshat, Dubai Chalo, Sohra Tay Jawai, Anokha Daaj, Bara Aadmi and Maula Dad. Later she appeared in films Riksha Driver, Shah Zaman, Sheeshay Ka Dil Lohay Kay Haath, Babul Dian Galian, Balocha Tay Daku, Da Sheshay Zra, Doli Tay Hathkari, Gernail Singh, Griftar, Turkhamar, Silsila, Masti Khan, Malka and Dillan Day Souday.

In 1984 she starred in film Ishq Nachaway Gali Gali with Ayaz Naik and Sabiha Khanum. The film was a super hit at the box office and she won Nigar Award for Best Actress for her role.

Rehman also sang songs in films and radio then she worked in films Meena Sur Angar Day, Bandish, Shama Chah Baligi Patangan Razi, Mohabtan Sachian, Jhoomar, Baghi, Puttar Makhan Gujjar Da, Ranjhay Hath Gandasa, Sahib Ji and Fiker Not.

She has worked in over one hundred films. In 2011 she worked in drama Hulla Ray along with Asma Abbas, Fareeha Jabeen, Kashif Mehmood and Ashraf Khan which aired on TV One. Then she started working in dramas and she appeared in drama Salma and Sotailay on PTV and in May 2022 she also launched her own YouTube Channel in which she does interviews of actors and actresses.

== Personal life ==
Rehman married film director Aslam Dar and they had two children: a son named Salman Rehman and a daughter named Maham Rehman, a singer. Durdana's sister Nadia Ali is an actress.

== Filmography ==
=== Television ===
Year	Title	Role	Network
2009	Salma	Salma	PTV
2011	Hulla Ray	Masarrat	TV One
2023	Sotailay	Hajra	PTV

=== Film ===
Year	Title	Role
1975	Paisa	Urdu
1975	Rabb Da Roop	Siraiki
1976	Sayyan Anari	Urdu
1976	Raja Jani	Urdu
1977	Baray Mian Deevanay	Urdu
1978	Goga	Punjabi
1979	Khak Aur Khoon	Urdu
1979	Ab Ghar Janay Do	Urdu
1979	Aurat Raj	Urdu
1979	Dehshat	Punjabi
1979	Dubai Chalo	Punjabi
1980	Sohra Tay Jawai	Punjabi
1981	Anokha Daaj	Punjabi
1981	Bara Aadmi	Urdu
1981	Maula Dad	Punjabi
1981	Chacha Bhateeja	Punjabi
1981	Mohabbat Aur Majboori	Urdu
1981	Chhanga Tay Manga	Punjabi
1981	2 Dil	Urdu
1982	Noukar Tay Malik	Punjabi
1982	Dostana	Punjabi
1982	Visa Dubai Da	Punjabi
1982	Mirza Jatt	Punjabi
1983	Dillan Day Souday	Punjabi
1983	Heera Pathar	Punjabi
1983	Sahib Ji	Punjabi
1983	Jatt Te Dogar	Punjabi
1983	Qudrat	Punjabi
1983	Khan Veer	Punjabi
1983	Sher Mama	Punjabi
1983	Baghi Sher	Punjabi
1984	Haibat Khan	Punjabi
1984	Fifty Fifty	Punjabi
1984	Teri Meri Ik Marzi	Punjabi
1984	Ishq Nachaway Gali Gali	Punjabi
1984	Reshmi Rumal	Punjabi
1985	Aashiana	Punjabi
1985	Bau Jhalla	Punjabi
1986	Riksha Driver	Punjabi
1986	Shah Zaman	Punjabi
1986	Sheeshay Ka Dil Lohay Kay Haath	Urdu
1986	Babul Dian Galian	Punjabi
1986	Balocha Tay Daku	Punjabi
1986	Da Sheshay Zra	Pashto
1987	Doli Tay Hathkari	Punjabi
1987	Gernail Singh	Punjabi
1987	Griftar	Pashto
1987	Turkhamar	Pashto
1987	Silsila	Punjabi
1987	Masti Khan	Urdu
1987	Malka	Punjabi
1987	Iqrar	Urdu
1987	Aeitbar	Pashto
1987	Heera Lal	Punjabi
1987	Khuli Kachehri	Punjabi
1988	Naseeb	Pashto
1988	Garm Lahoo	Punjabi
1988	Aman Ki Gaud	Urdu
1988	Daagh	Punjabi
1988	Kalay Baadal	Urdu
1988	Dakah	Pashto
1988	Damto Zor	Pashto
1989	Sher Shah	Pashto
1989	Yo Betaj Badshah	Pashto
1989	Sher Badshah	Pashto
1989	Grengo	Pashto
1989	Da Qudrat Insaf	Pashto
1990	Babrak	Pashto
1990	Daveene Jang	Pashto
1990	Lutera	Punjabi
1990	Qudrat Da Inteqam	Punjabi
1990	Da Tobak Zaba	Pashto
1990	Loafer	Pashto
1991	Pasoori Badshah	Punjabi
1991	Pyar Karn Tun Nein Darna	Punjabi / Urdu
1992	303	Pashto
1992	Zama Inteqam	Pashto
1992	Allah Bachayo	Sindhi
1993	Zovee Da Shaitan	Pashto
1993	Tabahe	Pashto
1993	Da Shaitanano Janj	Pashto
1994	Chargal	Pashto
1994	Aflatoon	Pashto
1994	Da Zond Mela	Pashto
1994	Tandurda Aasman	Pashto
1994	Warrant	Pashto
1994	Riwaj	Pashto
1994	Yalghar	Pashto
1994	Paisay Ta Salam	Pashto
1995	Aur Toofan	Pashto
1995	Pazeb	Urdu
1995	Ghahl Daku Badmash	Pashto
1997	Karishma	Urdu
1997	Ham Kisi Say Kam Nahin	Urdu
1998	Darshal	Pashto
1998	Lordabala	Pashto
1998	Gataba Zamavi	Pashto
1999	Aish-o-Ishrat	Pashto
1999	Sorpezwan	Pashto
1999	Paranda	Punjabi
2000	Doneojam	Pashto
2001	Leontob	Pashto
2002	Ghazi Ilmuddin Shaheed	Urdu
2003	Meena Sur Angar Day	Pashto
2003	Bandish	Urdu
2004	Shama Chah Baligi Patangan Razi	Pashto
2007	Mohabtan Sachian	Punjabi
2007	Jhoomar	Urdu
2012	Baghi	Pashto
2014	Puttar Makhan Gujjar Da	Punjabi
2014	Ranjhay Hath Gandasa	Punjabi
2016	Fiker Not	Urdu
2016	Haidar Gujjar	Punjabi

== Awards and recognition ==
Year	Award	Category	Result	Title	Ref.
1984	Nigar Award	Best Actress	Won	Ishq Nachaway Gali Gali	
2013	Bolan Awards	Lifetime Achievement Award	Won	Contribution to Cinema	
2020	40th Bolan Awards	Lifetime Achievement Award	Won	Contribution to Media Industry	
2022	Cultural Journalists Foundation of Pakistan	Lifetime Achievement Award	Won	Contribution to Cinema	
2023	Alhamra Art Center	Mumtaz Begum Special Award	Won	Contribution to Film Cinema	
2023	Waheed Murad Awards	Tribute to Pakistani Legends	Won	Contribution to Cinema	
2024	Fatima Jinnah Gold Medal	Lifetime Achievement Award	Won	Contribution to Film Industry	
