= Muhammad Mansha Yaad =

Pakistani writer

- محمد منشا یاد
- Born: Muhammad Mansha Yaad; 5 September 1937; Thattha Nishtran village, Farooqabad, Punjab, Pakistan
- Died: 15 October 2011 (aged 74); Islamabad, Pakistan
- Occupations: Writer, playwright
- Spouse: Farhat Nasim Akhtar
- Writing career
- Pen name: Yaad
- Genre: Fiction
- Subject: Literature
- Website: www.manshayaad.com

Muhammad Mansha Yaad (Urdu: محمد منشا یاد؛ Punjabi: محمد منشا یاد) was a writer and playwright from Punjab, Pakistan. He received the Pride of Performance award in 2005 from the Government of Pakistan. He has won many other awards from organizations in various countries which are also listed in this article.

His first short story appeared in 1955 and his first collection of stories was published in 1975. He contributed Urdu and Punjabi stories to many literary magazines. He has published ten collections of short stories, including one in Punjabi, along with a novel in Punjabi, Tanwan Tanwan Tara, and many television series and plays.

== Personal life and education ==
Muhammad Mansha Yaad was born on 5 September 1937 in Thattha Nishtran, a village about 18 kilometer from Farooqabad. He studied in village Gajyana Nau up to 5th grade and completed his matriculation examination from Hafizabad and earned a diploma in engineering from Rasul College in 1955. He passed examinations of Fazil-e-Urdu in 1964, gained a Bachelor of Arts degree in 1965, Masters in Urdu in 1967 and Master in Punjabi in 1972 from University of the Punjab.

He was married in Lahore to his cousin Farhat Nasim Akhtar in 1960. He had one daughter and three sons.

Yaad joined the Pakistan Government Service in 1958 in PWD Rehabilitation in Rawalpindi and Murree for about two years (1958–1960) as a Sub-Engineer, and in 1960, he joined Federal Capital Commission which was later converted into Capital Development Authority (CDA), Islamabad, as Sub-Engineer and then served as an Assistant Engineer, Executive Engineer, Public Relations Officer & Chief Complaints Officer over time and retired as Deputy Director in 1997.

=== Death and legacy ===
Mansha Yaad's mother used to tell young Mansha Punjabi folk songs, tales and popular stories. Dawn (newspaper) in its article on Mansha Yaad remarked, "Such upbringing turned an engineer into a short story writer who emerged as a good quality writer in the subcontinent."

After his retirement, he lived in Islamabad at his residence known as Afsana Manzil (منزل افسانہ or "Fiction Destination") and devoted his time to literature and literary events. He died of a heart attack on 15 October 2011 in Islamabad.

== Pen name ==
As a youngster he had a keen interest in poetry and, after considering several pen names, chose "Yaad". His work responsibilities allowed him little time to stay involved in writing and he slowly drifted him apart from poetry. Yet he kept the pen name hoping eventually to return to poetry. As he says: "Didn’t know when smoke may start rising from the poem kiln again".

== Works ==
=== Short stories ===
"Band Muthi Main Jugnoo" (بند مٹھی میں جگنو) ("Fireflies in a closed fist"), "Maas aur Mitti" (ماس اور مٹی) "Khala Andar Khala" (خلا اندر خلا) ("Void within Void"). "Waqt Samunder" "Wagda Panni (Punjabi Shah Mukhi & Gur Mukhi)", "Darakhat Aadmi", "Door Ki Awaaz", "Tamaasha", "Kwawab Saraay", "Ik Kankar Thairey Paani Mein" ("A pebble in still waters").

=== Novels ===
- Taanwan Taanwan Taara (ٹان٘واں ٹان٘واں تارا) (Punjabi novel)

== Writing for television ==
Rahain was a serial drama by PTV Lahore centre in 1998. It was based on the Punjabi novel "Tanwa Tanwa Tara" by Yaad. The drama focuses on different societal issue of people both living in urban and rural areas such as the value of education, culture and justice.

== Literary activities ==
In 1972, Yaad founded Halqa Arbab e Zauq, Islamabad, the first prominent literary organization in the capital city.

In Islamabad, he also founded some other literary organizations such as Likhnay Walon Ki Anjuman, Rabta, Bazame Kitab and Fiction Forum, which enriched the newly built city literarily and culturally.

== Translations ==
- Children and Gunpowder
- The Eyes of Jacob
- The Noose
- Replica

== Awards and recognition ==
- Baba Farid Adabi Award for Best Novel Writer (2006)
- Life Time Achievement Award at 12th International Punjabi Conference (2005)
- Pride of Performance Award for Novel and Short Story writing, by the Pakistan Government (2005)
- Life Time Achievement Award by Writers Forum, Islamabad (2004)
- Punjabi Adabi Culture Sangat Award (2004)
- Awarded by Punjabi Likhari Forum, United Kingdom for his Literary Work (2004)
- Exceptional Performance Award by Sadai Adab International (DFW Metroplex UK 2004)

== See also ==
- Bano Qudsia
- Wasif Ali Wasif
- Qudrat Ullah Shahab
- Mumtaz Mufti
- Ibn-e-Insha
