= Tahira Naqvi =

Pakistani actress

- طاہرہ نقوی
- Born: Tahira Naqvi; 20 August 1956; Allo Mahar, Daska, Sialkot District, Punjab, Pakistan
- Died: 2 June 1982 (aged 25); Combined Military Hospital Rawalpindi, Rawalpindi, Punjab, Pakistan
- Resting place: Lahore
- Other names: Mistress of Emotions
- Education: Convent of Jesus and Mary, Lahore
- Occupation: Actress
- Years active: 1974 - 1982
- Children: 1
- Awards: PTV Best Actress Award (1982)

Tahira Naqvi (Punjabi, Urdu: طاہرہ نقوی; 20 August 1956 – 2 June 1982) was a Pakistani actress who began her career in the 1970s and worked until her death at the age of 25. She became popular by appearing in several television series and two films in her career spanning a few years. She was known as the Mistress of Emotions because she portrayed roles of sentiment, nostalgia, and despondency in dramas. Tahira, along with Uzma Gillani, Khalida Riyasat, and Roohi Bano, dominated Pakistan's television screens during the 1970s and 1980s.

== Early life ==
Tahira Naqvi was born in Daska, Pakistan, on August 20, 1956. She completed her early studies at the Convent of Jesus and Mary, Lahore, and later graduated from Government Girls College.

== Career ==
She began her career as a television actress. Tahira also worked at Radio Pakistan in 1974, and she worked in fifty television dramas. In 1976, she played a role in a theatre play about drug addiction among the youth in Pakistan. Tahira did a lead role in Hash along with Talat Hussain. Written by Sarmad Sehbai, the play was shown at Government College, Kinnaird College, National Councils of the Arts and Lahore College. She acted in television serials Zindagi Bandagi (1978), Waris (1979) and Dehleez (1981). She also won the PTV Award for Best Actress. Tahira also appeared in two films Badaltey Mosam (1980) and Mian Biwi Razi (1982) both of the movies were Silver Jubliee hits at the Box Office but her main focus was on television. She became a famous name in early 80s and received extensive praise for her work.

== Personal life ==
Tahira was married and she had one daughter named Asma Ahmed Khan.

== Illness and death ==
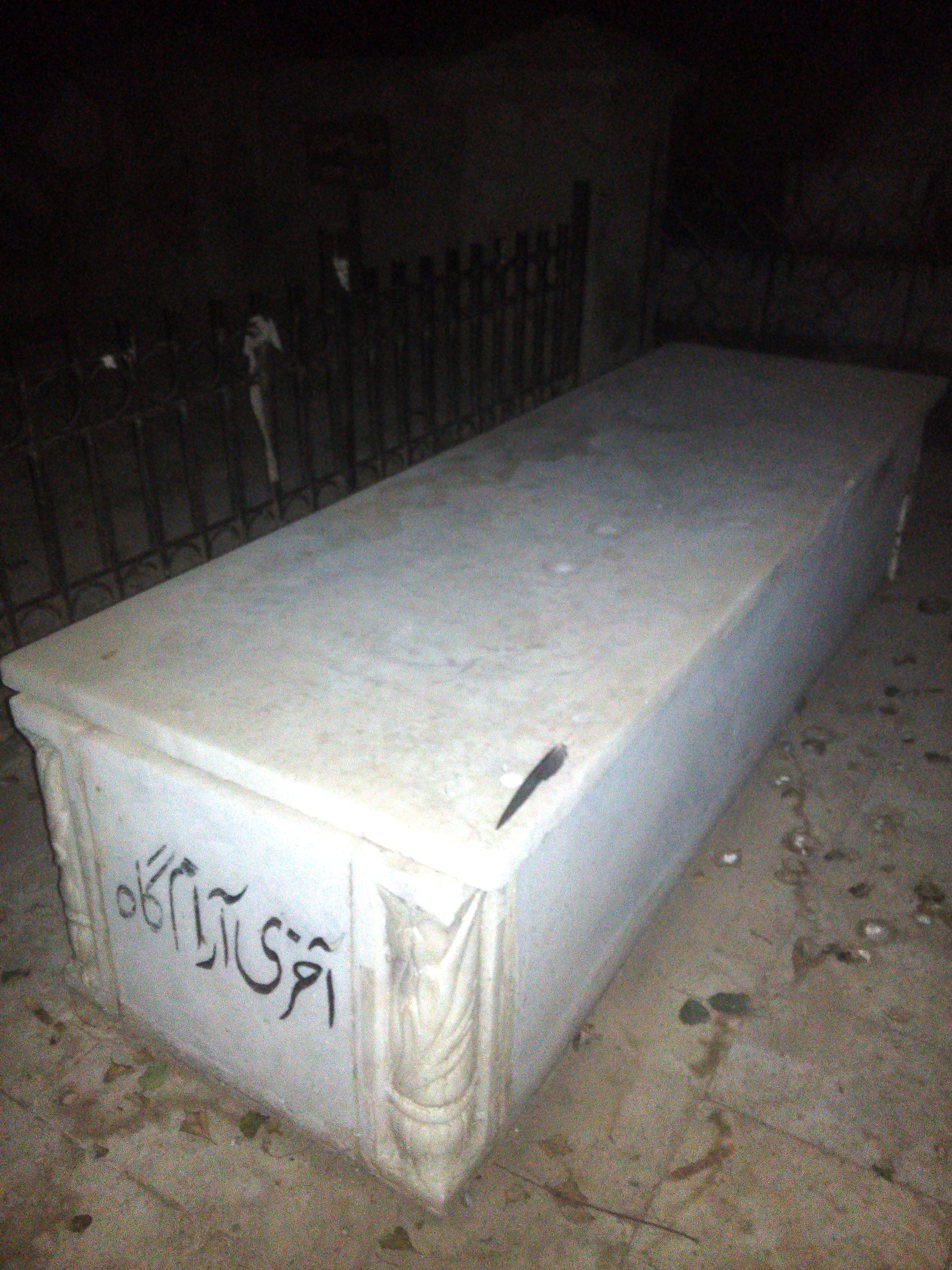
Naqvi's grave at Mian Mir graveyard Lahore

Tahira was diagnosed with cancer and was admitted to Combined Military Hospital (CMH) in Rawalpindi for treatment. On 2 June 1982, she died at the CMH at the age of 25 after battling cancer. She was buried in the compound's graveyard at the tomb of Mian Mir in Lahore.

== Filmography ==
=== Television series ===
- Dastak Na Do
- Zanjeer
- Madan-e-Mohabbat
- Zindagi Bandagi
- Manzil Hai Kahan
- Khana Badosh
- Waris
- Ek Haqeeqat Ek Fasana
- Dehleez
- Eshaan
- Siah Kiran
- Aur Drame
- Sayeen Aur Psychiatrist

=== Telefilm ===
- Madawa

=== Film ===
- Badaltey Mosam
- Mian Biwi Razi

=== Theatre ===
- Hash

== Honour ==
In 2021 on August 16 the Government of Pakistan named a street and intersection after her in Lahore.

== Awards and nominations ==
| Year | Award | Category | Result | Title | Ref. |
|---|---|---|---|---|---|
| 1982 | PTV Award | Best Actress | Won | Zindagi Bandagi | |
