= Nusrat Thakur =

- Born: 1937; Lahore, Punjab, British India
- Died: 6 November 2009 (aged 71–72); Lahore, Punjab, Pakistan
- Occupations: Television producer and director
- Years active: 1960s – 1990s
- Known for: Directing TV dramas Waris (serial), Dehleez

Nusrat Thakur (1937 – 6 November 2009) was a Pakistani television director and producer. He was the producer of some of the most successful PTV dramas like Waris and Dehleez.

== Early life and career ==
Nusrat Thakur was born at Lahore, British India in 1937. His father's name was M.J. Thakur who was a radio personality. Nusrat Thakur started his career at Radio Pakistan in the 1960s. Later he started his television career by assisting noted PTV producer and director Yawar Hayat Khan in the 1970s, followed by producing and directing TV dramas independently. He retired as General Manager of PTV, Lahore in the 1990s after a service of 40 years with this Pakistani television.

== Death and legacy ==
Nusrat Thakur died of cardiac arrest on 6 November 2009 at Lahore after a brief illness. He had been diabetic for some time and that had led to some other complications in the past. Among his survivors are his wife, a son and a daughter. Nusrat Thakur was against the glamourisation of women or expensive and grand TV sets. Instead he brought a certain degree of realism into all his TV plays.

== TV Dramas ==
Most of Nusrat Thakur's directed TV plays were written by Amjad Islam Amjad and Asghar Nadeem Syed

- Waris (1979)
- Dehleez (1980s)
- Waqt
- Samundar
- Raat
- Pyas
- Duniya (1990s)
- Eendhan (1990s)
- Ghulam Gardish (1998)
- Tawan (Early 2000s)
