= Laag (TV series) =

- Title screen
- Genre: Action; Crime; Drama
- Written by: Rauf Khalid
- Directed by: Rauf Khalid
- Starring: Rauf Khalid; Zeba Bakhtiar; Nadia Khan; Sohail Asghar; Nayyar Ejaz; Nirma; Naima Khan; Rashid Mehmood
- Country of origin: Pakistan
- Original language: Urdu
- No. of episodes: 27

Production
- Producer: Rauf Khalid
- Running time: ~35 minutes

Original release
- Network: PTV
- Release: 1998 – 2000

Laag (Urdu: لاگ) is a Pakistani action crime drama serial that aired on PTV from 1998 until 2000. Its story was based on the issues of Kashmir and mostly shot in Pakistan-administered parts of Kashmir. The serial was written, directed, and produced by Rauf Khalid.

== Plot ==
Huraira is a child from a family struggling to get by in the Indian-administered Kashmir. In an attack planned by JKLF area commander Ghulam Butt, all of Huraira's siblings are killed. Huraira is lucky enough to escape and is found by a Hindu couple. The couple raises him as "Kailash", and he leaves his former life behind. However, he is haunted by his past when he grows into a man and witnesses hostile elements in the Indian-controlled part of Kashmir.

== Cast ==
- Rauf Khalid as Kailash Agarwal/Huraira
- Zeba Bakhtiar as Bisaal Indaraabi
- Nadia Khan as Safia
- Fareedullah as Waleed Abdullah
- Azra Aftab as Zubaida
- Farooq Ashraf Awan as Father of Kalash
- Sohail Asghar as Ghulam Butt / Kaku Lala
- Nayyar Ejaz as Major Kalidas
- Naima Khan as Riffat Ara
- Nirma as Squadern Leader Sheetal Kaali Das
- Rashid Mehmood as Moomal
- Lateef Arshad

== See also ==
- Pakistan Television Corporation
- List of television programmes broadcast by PTV
