= Mian Biwi Razi =

1982 film

- Directed by: Sangeeta
- Written by: Iqbal Rizvi
- Produced by: Syed Tayyab Ali
- Starring: Nadeem Baig; Tahira Naqvi; Kaveeta; Agha Sikandar; Shehla Gill
- Music by: Kamal Ahmad (Composer); Naheed Akhtar, Masood Rana, A. Nayyar (Singers)
- Release date: 29 January 1982 (Pakistan)
- Country: Pakistan
- Language: Urdu

Mian Biwi Razi (Urdu: میاں بیوی راضی, lit. 'If the Spouses are in Agreement') is a 1982 comedy–drama film directed by Sangeeta, written by Iqbal Rizvi and produced by Syed Tayyab Ali.

The film stars Nadeem Baig, Tahira Naqvi, Kaveeta, Agha Sikandar, Shehla Gill and Saqi. It was released on 29 January 1982, was a box-office hit and ended up being a Platinum Jubilee film of 1982.

This was Tahira Naqvi's last acting role. She died of cancer six months after the film's release.

== Cast ==
- Nadeem Baig
- Tahira Naqvi
- Kaveeta
- Agha Sikandar
- Shehla Gill
- Saqi

== Soundtrack ==
The soundtrack of the film consisting of five songs was composed by Kamal Ahmed, and the film songs were sung by Naheed Akhtar, Masood Rana and A. Nayyar.

=== Songs ===
1. Bhikaran Hun Bhuki Hazar Din Say, Sung by Naheed Akhtar, lyrics by Taslim Fazli
2. Ishq Na Dekhay Oonch Neech Ko
3. Mausam Suhana Mausam, Sung by A. Nayyar, lyrics by Saeed Gillani
4. Shehri Babu Say Karke Shadi, Main Dekho, Sung by Naheed Akhtar, lyrics by Khawaja Pervez
5. Soona Tha Jeevan, Tu Nay Bakhera Rang Pyar Ka, Sung by Naheed Akhtar and A. Nayyar, lyrics by Saeed Gillani
