= Mehboob Alam (actor) =

Pakistani actor

- محبوب عالم
- Born: Mehboob Alam; 14 March 1948; Hyderabad, Pakistan
- Died: 23 May 1993 (aged 45); Karachi, Sindh, Pakistan
- Other names: Mahboob Alam
- Education: Masters in History
- Occupations: Actor; film actor; radio artist
- Years active: 1970–1994

Mehboob Alam (14 March 1948 – 23 May 1993) was a Pakistani actor. He is best known for playing the feudal Chaudhry Hashmat Ali in the PTV drama Waris (1979).

== Early life and education ==
Mehboob Alam was born in 1948 in Tando Ghulam Ali, Matli District, Hyderabad in Pakistan. He did his Masters in History and he also worked at Radio Pakistan later he made his debut in Sindhi film Soorath.

== Career ==
=== Television ===
Some of his notable television roles include those in the PTV drama Waris (1979) Andhera Ujala (1984), Apnay Log (1985) and Neelay Hath in 1989.

=== Cinema ===
Mehboob Alam acted in 38 movies (12 Urdu, 15 Punjabi, and 11 Sindhi), including Sooarth (Sindhi, 1973), Rut Ja Ristha, Dharti La Kunwar (1975), Dharti Dilwaran Jee (Sindhi, 1975), Shehzor (Sindhi, 1976), Khaak Aur Khoon (Urdu, 1979), Chotay Nawab (Urdu, 1980), Chan Varyam (Punjabi, 1981), Fatafat (Punjabi, 1981), Khan Balouch (Punjabi, 1985), and Darya Khan (Sindhi, 1991).

== Death and legacy ==
He died on 18 March 1994 in Karachi at age 46 and was laid to rest in his ancestral graveyard in Hyderabad district.

In 2005 at 1st Indus Drama Awards in Karachi, he was posthumously honoured with Special Award for his contributions to cinema which was given to his family and tributes were paid to him by television personalities including Moin Akhter, Adnan Siddiqui, Faysal Qureshi, Sultana Siddiqui, Humayun Saeed and Babra Sharif.

== Filmography ==
=== Television series ===
| Year | Title | Role | Network |
|---|---|---|---|
| 1979 | Waris | Chaudhry Hashmat Ali | PTV |
| 1981 | Dehleez | Rafiq | PTV |
| 1982 | Alif Noon | Customer | PTV |
| 1983 | Ragon Mein Andhera | Officer | PTV |
| 1983 | Nangay Paon | Mirza Aziz Koka | PTV |
| 1983 | Samundar | Shabaz Khan | PTV |
| 1984 | Andhera Ujala | Police officer | PTV |
| 1984 | 20 Golden Years Of PTV | Himself | PTV |
| 1984 | Khul Ja Sim Sim | Ayesha's father | PTV |
| 1985 | Waqt | Muzafar's Father | PTV |
| 1985 | Dubai Chalo | Chaudhry | PTV |
| 1985 | Apnay Log | Sarwar Ejaz | PTV |
| 1986 | Deadline | Sohail | PTV |
| 1986 | Sacha Jhoot | DSP | PTV |
| 1987 | Wadi | Karam Khan | PTV |
| 1987 | Raat | Mehmood | PTV |
| 1988 | Mama Seemi | Nanva | PTV |
| 1989 | Pyas | Sanwal | PTV |
| 1989 | Neelay Hath | Jeevan | PTV |
| 1990 | Fishaar | Toheed | PTV |
| 1994 | Manchalay Ka Sauda | Sufi Karni | PTV |

=== Film ===
| Year | Film | Language |
|---|---|---|
| 1973 | Soorath | Sindhi |
| 1974 | Ghairat Jo Sawal | Sindhi / Punjabi |
| 1975 | Rutt Ja Rishta | Sindhi |
| 1975 | Dharti Lal Kanwar | Sindhi |
| 1975 | Nawabzada | Punjabi |
| 1975 | Dharti Dil Waran Ji | Sindhi |
| 1975 | Masoom | Urdu |
| 1976 | Shehzor | Sindhi |
| 1977 | Aamna Samna | Urdu |
| 1977 | Dard | Urdu |
| 1977 | Apnay Huay Paraey | Urdu |
| 1978 | Sharmili | Urdu |
| 1978 | Prince | Urdu |
| 1978 | Haider Ali | Urdu |
| 1978 | Achhay Mian | Urdu |
| 1978 | Haidar Daler | Siraiki |
| 1979 | Khaak Aur Khoon | Urdu |
| 1979 | Har Fun Maula | Punjabi |
| 1980 | Rishta | Urdu |
| 1980 | Chotay Nawab | Urdu |
| 1981 | Fatafat | Sindhi |
| 1981 | Chan Varyam | Punjabi |
| 1982 | Wehshi Daku | Punjabi |
| 1983 | Border Built | Urdu |
| 1983 | Shagird Maulay Jatt Da | Punjabi |
| 1984 | Lal Toofan | Punjabi |
| 1985 | Khan Baloch | Siraiki |
| 1986 | Joora | Punjabi |
| 1986 | Poti Ain Pag | Pashto |
| 1987 | Mera Insaf | Urdu |
| 1987 | Khuli Kachehri | Punjabi |
| 1991 | Darya Khan | Sindhi |

== Awards and recognition ==
| Year | Award | Category | Result | Title | Ref. |
|---|---|---|---|---|---|
| 2005 | The 1st Indus Drama Awards | Special Award | Won | Contribution to Cinema | |
