= Ek Din Bahu Ka =

Pakistani film

- ایک دن بہو کا
- Directed by: Shabab Kiranvi
- Written by: Shabab Kiranvi
- Produced by: Shabab Kiranvi
- Starring: Babra Sharif; Bindiya; Ayaz Naik; Bazgha
- Music by: M. Ashraf
- Distributed by: Shabab Productions
- Release date: 23 July 1982
- Running time: 150 minutes
- Country: Pakistan
- Language: Urdu

Ek Din Bahu Ka (Urdu: ایک دن بہو کا, lit. 'One day daughter-in-law') is a 1982 Pakistani film written, directed and produced by Shabab Kiranvi. It stars Babra Sharif, Bindiya, Ayaz Naik, and Bazgha in leading roles.

== Plot ==
The story is about Zeenat (Bazgha) a daughter-in-law who faces problems from her mother-in-law Jannat (Tani Begum) and her daughter Salma (Bindiya) but her brother-in-law Rashid (Ayaz Naik) is very supportive of her and later he marries Nishat (Babra Sharif) a very kind girl.

== Cast ==
- Babra Sharif as Nishat
- Bindiya as Salma
- Ayaz Naik as Rashid
- Bazgha as Zeenat
- Tamanna as Bano
- Shehla Gill as Sitara
- Aurangzeb Leghari as Hamid
- Tani Begum as Jannat
- Nayyar Sultana as Malika Aliya
- Nanha as Chaudry Nooruddin Jahangir
- Jameel Fakhri as Banih Mian
- Master Khurram as Bubblo
- Asha Posley as Begum
- Khalid Saleem Mota as Guest
- Sikander Shaheen

== Music ==
All lyrics are written by Saeed Gilani; all music is composed by M. Ashraf.

Ek Din Bahu Ka
No.	Title	Singer (s)	Length
1.	"Disco Deewani Mera"	Naheed Akhtar	5:59
2.	"O Jane Jan"	Naheed Akhtar	5:26
3.	"Aaenge Mausam"	A. Nayyar	5:18
4.	"Phool Gulshan Mein"	Naheed Akhtar & Sammi Mussarat	5:11
5.	"Ek Din Bahu Ka"	Sammi Mussarat	6:01

== Reception ==
The film was released on 23 July 1982, and was a box office hit.
