= Pyas =

1989 Pakistani television drama series

- پیاس
- Genre: Drama
- Written by: Asghar Nadeem Syed
- Directed by: Nusrat Thakur
- Starring: Arifa Siddiqui; Abid Ali; Shakila Qureshi; Sohail Asghar; Tahira Wasti; Ajab Gul
- Country of origin: Pakistan
- Original language: Urdu
- No. of seasons: 1
- No. of episodes: 13

Production
- Producer: Nusrat Thakur

Original release
- Network: PTV
- Release: 1989 – 1989

Pyas (Urdu: پیاس, lit. 'Thirst') is a 1989 Pakistani television drama series written by Asghar Nadeem Syed and produced and directed by Nusrat Thakur. Broadcast on PTV, the series was received favourably by audiences in both Pakistan and India. It received three Nigar Awards in 1989, including Best Producer, Best Actress and Best Writer.

== Plot ==
The series follows Seema, a young woman living with her parents. Her father, Qadir Khan, treats her harshly, while her mother, Taj Bibi, is gentle and supportive. The household is disrupted when Qadir takes a second wife, Shamshad, straining his relationship with Seema. Taj Bibi, by contrast, comes to accept the new marriage.

== Cast ==
Actor	Character
Arifa Siddiqui	Seema
Abid Ali	Qadir Khan
Shakila Qureshi	Shamshad
Nighat Butt	Taj Bibi
Tahira Wasti	Zainab
Sohail Asghar	Suhara (Lala)
Ajab Gul	Jenwra
Irsa Ghazal	Jeeran
Nida Mumtaz	Janto
Afzaal Ahmad	Syed Suleman Shah
Masood Akhtar	Jeeran's father
Mehboob Alam	Sanwal
Mehmood Aslam	Munshi Hayat
Ghayyur Akhtar	Police Inspector
Abid Khan	Faqeer Saen
Kanwal Nauman	Zareena
Azmul Haq	Ashraf
Altaf-ur-Rahman	Malik Mastan (Mastoo)
Munir Nadir	Policeman

== Accolades ==
Awards and nominations for Pyas
Year	Award	Category	Recipient	Result	Ref.
1989	Nigar Award	Best Producer	Nusrat Thakur	Won	
1989	Nigar Award	Best Actress	Shakila Qureshi	Won	
1989	Nigar Award	Best Writer	Asghar Nadeem Syed	Won	

== Broadcast and adaptation ==
Pyas was rebroadcast on PTV on several occasions and was later included in the network's archive segment PTV Gold Hour.

In June 2016, the Indian lyricist and screenwriter Javed Akhtar was reported to have approached Asghar Nadeem Syed regarding a possible film adaptation of the series.
