= Dehleez (1981 TV series) =

- Created by: Amjad Islam Amjad
- Directed by: Yawar Hayat Khan (assisted by Kunwar Aftab Ahmed, Qanbar Ali Shah, Nusrat Thakur)
- Starring: Roohi Bano; Mehboob Alam; Uzma Gillani; Asif Raza Mir; Qavi Khan; Afzaal Ahmad; Tahira Naqvi; Firdous Jamal; Khayam Sarhadi; Aurangzeb Leghari; Agha Sikandar; Najma Mehboob; Talat Siddiqui
- Country of origin: Pakistan
- Original language: Urdu
- No. of episodes: 13

Production
- Producers: PTV, Lahore Centre
- Running time: 50 minutes

Original release
- Network: PTV
- Release: 1981

Dehleez is a 1981 Pakistani television series which aired on PTV from Lahore center.

Written by Amjad Islam Amjad, it featured Roohi Bano, Mahboob Alam, Uzma Gillani and Tahira Naqvi among others. The serial was directed by Yawar Hayat Khan and assisted by Qambar Ali Shah, Kunwar Aftab Ahmed and Nusrat Thakur. Dehleez is one of the famous PTV dramas, still remembered for its storyline and star cast. The drama is considered a cult classic and one of the rarest gems of PTV. It was re-aired on the 50th anniversary of PTV in 2014.

== Cast ==
- Roohi Bano as Saeeda
- Uzma Gillani as Anisa Ahmad
- Qavi Khan as Faqir Hussain
- Afzaal Ahmad as Ahmad Ali
- Mehboob Alam as Rafiq
- Tahira Naqvi as Tamkeen
- Agha Sikandar as Abid Khan
- Arifa Siddiqui as Ani
- Aurangzeb Leghari as Jahangir
- Firdous Jamal as Jamal
- Asif Raza Mir as Akhtar
- Khayyam Sarhadi as Khalid
- Abid Kashmiri as Salmat
- Mona Siddiqui as Neelam
- Najma Mehboob as Salma
- Badi Uzzaman as Samandar Khan
- Ghayyur Akhtar as Taj Din
- Jameel Fakhri as Lalu
- Mehmood Akhtar as Shahbaz
- Tauqeer Nasir as Nasir
- Khalid Butt as Sami
- Asim Bukhari as Editor
- Munir Nadir as Malik
- Talat Siddiqui as Shafiq's wife
- Ayub Khan as Shafiq
- Irfan Hashmi as Jeella
- Tashfeen as Saeeda's friend
- Asad Nazir as Saeed Ghani
- Fakhri Ahmed as Faiz
- Mohammad Zubair as Fateh Muhammad
