= Khalid Saleem Mota =

Pakistani comedian (born 1947)

- خالد سلیم موٹا
- Born: Khalid Saleem; 1947 (age 78–79); Chiniot, District Jhang
- Education: B.A., LLB
- Occupation: Comedy actor
- Years active: 1968 - 2010
- Children: 3 sons and 2 daughters

Khalid Saleem Mota is a Pakistani former comedian actor who worked in TV dramas and films during the 1970s and 1980s.

== Life and career ==
Mota was born in 1947 in Chiniot, District Jhang. He received early school education at his hometown. He moved to Faisalabad as a young boy with his family as the majority of his family members are business owners. Later, the family moved to Hyderabad, where he went on to do his matriculation and intermediate. Mota relocated to Lahore after earning his bachelor's degree with the intention of becoming an actor.

He was introduced to television by the writer Athar Shah Khan Jaidi. He appeared in more than 300 Urdu and Punjabi films.

== Personal life ==
In 2010, both his legs were amputated due to diabetes-related complications, making him unable to continue his acting career. He has 3 sons and 2 daughters. Presently, he is living a retired life.

== Filmography ==
A list of his selected films includes:

- 1968: Kanjus (Punjabi)
- 1971: Ucha Naa Pyar Da (Punjabi)
- 1972: Khan Chacha (Punjabi)
- 1973: Parday Mein Rehnay Do (Urdu)
- 1973: Anmol (Urdu)
- 1973: Daman Aur Chingari (Urdu)
- 1973: Rangeela Aur Munawar Zarif (Urdu)
- 1974: Main Bani Dulhan (Urdu)
- 1974: Tiger Gang (Urdu)
- 1974: Subah Ka Tara (Urdu)
- 1974: Aaina Aur Soorat (Urdu)
- 1974: Namak Haraam (Urdu)
- 1974: Dushman (Urdu)
- 1974: Bahisht (Urdu)
- 1974: Shama (Urdu)
- 1975: Bin Badal Barsaat (Urdu)
- 1975: Aarzoo (Urdu)
- 1975: Teray Meray Sapnay (Urdu)
- 1975: Mohabbat Zindagi Hay (Urdu)
- 1975: Do Sathi (Urdu)
- 1975: Shararat (Urdu)
- 1975: Sheeda Pastol (Punjabi)
- 1975: Roshni (Urdu)
- 1975: Jab Jab Phool Khilay (Urdu)
- 1975: Noukar (Urdu)
- 1975: Zanjeer (Urdu)
- 1976: Zubaida (Urdu)
- 1976: Talash (Urdu)
- 1976: Toofan (Punjabi)
- 1976: Daaman Ki Aag (Urdu)
- 1976: Sohni Mehinwal (Punjabi)
- 1976: Zaroorat (Urdu)
- 1977: Begum Jan (Urdu)
- 1977: Ishq Ishq (Urdu)
- 1977: Sadqay Teri Mout Tun (Punjabi)
- 1977: Apnay Huay Paraey (Urdu)
- 1977: Salakhen (Urdu)
- 1978: Sharmili (Urdu)
- 1978: Abhi To Main Jawan Hun (Urdu)
- 1978: Intekhab (Urdu)
- 1978: Mazi, Haal Aur Mustaqbil (Urdu)
- 1978: Puttar Phannay Khan Da (Punjabi)
- 1979: Maula Jatt (Punjabi)
- 1979: Aurat Raj (Urdu)
- 1979: Permit (Punjabi)
- 1980: Chotay Nawab (Urdu)
- 1980: Bandhan (Urdu)
- 1980: Nahin Abhi Nahin (Urdu)
- 1980: Sohra Tay Jawai (Punjabi)
- 1980: Behram Daku (Punjabi)
- 1981: Chacha Bhateeja (Punjabi)
- 1981: Sala Sahib (Punjabi)
- 1981:Athra Puttar (Punjabi)
- 1981:Wehshi Daku (Punjabi)
- 1983:Ek Din Bahu Ka (Urdu)
- 1984: Muqaddar Ka Sikandar (film) (Urdu)
- 1985: Hero (Urdu)
- 1985: Angara (Punjabi)
- 1987: Dulari (Punjabi)
