= Angar Wadi =

- Title screen
- Genre: Action; Drama; Thriller
- Written by: Rauf Khalid
- Directed by: Tariq Mairaj
- Starring: Rauf Khalid; Atiqa Odho; Farid Ullah; Shagufta Ali; Qavi Khan; Khayyam Sarhadi
- Country of origin: Pakistan
- Original language: Urdu
- No. of episodes: 18

Production
- Producer: Rauf Khalid
- Running time: 28 min.
- Production company: PTV

Original release
- Network: PTV
- Release: 1994 – 1994

Angar Wadi (Urdu: انگار وادی, lit. 'Cindered Valley') is a Pakistani television play/drama. It was aired by PTV in 1994, and comprises 18 episodes. It was directed by Tariq Mairaj, written and produced by Abdul Rauf Khalid.

== Plot ==
Captain Hamza is an Indian Army captain and a Kashmiri by origin. His family consists of his father, Shafi, his mother, a younger sister Nazo, and an elder brother, Talha, who is a lecturer at Gandhi Medical College, Delhi. After conflicts with the administration, he resigns and opens a clinic for the poor but is persecuted for allegedly treating militants. After several days, the Indian Army releases him on Captain Hamza's efforts. Talha later joins Molvi Mushtaque, who is the commander of Hizbul Mujahideen. Talha's ex-colleague Osha also comes with him. Osha has a crush on Dr. Talha. Meanwhile, Hamza meets a beautiful Kashmiri girl, Hajra, who is an MBBS student. They fall in love with one another. Later, it is revealed that Hajra is engaged to her cousin Hanif, who is a non-educated irresponsible person, and she dislikes him. She manages to convince her mother to let her marry Hamza. There comes a huge twist in their lives when Hamza is accused of helping militants and is tried by a court-martial. Hamza is sentenced to jail with hard labour for 25 years. He manages to escape from there with the help of his old friend Colonel Balber. The Indian Army performs a massive crackdown operation on Hamza's home town. Hamza's mother is also killed. Then, Hamza too joins Hizbul Mujahideen to pursue the independence of Kashmir from the Indian state. Hajra's mother dies from a severe health condition, and Hajra escapes from her uncle's house to marry Hamza. Indian Army raids on the militants, where Osha is arrested while saving Molvi Mushtaque. Soldiers arrest Molvi Mushtaque. He dies later under health conditions from the Indian Army, and Dr. Talha takes an oath to continue his mission. Shafi and Nazo manage to cross the border and escape to Pakistan, while Hajra joins Hamza to cross the control line. While they are crossing the border, Indian BSF opens fire on them, killing Hamza. Hajra is successfully rescued by the Pakistan Army. Later, Hajra gives birth to a son who is named Obaid-ur-Rehman by his grandfather Shafi.

== Cast ==
- Rauf Khalid as Captain Hamza Shafee Shaheed
- Atiqa Odho as Dr. Hajra Hamza Shafee
- Farid Ullah as Mujahideen Commander Dr. Talha
- Shagufta Ali as Dr. Usha
- Qavi Khan as Professor Shafee; Hamza and Talha's father
- Khayyam Sarhadi as Senior Mujahideen Commander Maulvi Mushtaq Shaheed
- Nisar Qadri as Principal
- Atiya Sharaf as Hamza's mother
- Rashid Mehmood as Col. Ram Lal
- Samina Ahmad as Hajra's Mother
- Saleem Khawaja as Ajit Nolakkha
- Naveen Naqvi as Sonaina
