= Riaz Mahmood =

Pakistani radio personality and TV actor

Riaz Mahmood PP
- ریاض محمُود
- Born: 1937 (age 88–89); Lahore, Punjab, British India
- Occupations: Actor; Broadcaster; Writer
- Years active: 1958–present
- Employer: Radio Pakistan
- Notable work: Rahain; Kajal Ghar; Bol
- Awards: Pride of Performance (2007)

Riaz Mahmood (Punjabi, Urdu: ریاض محمُود) is a veteran Pakistani actor and senior radio broadcaster from Lahore, who remained associated with Radio Pakistan for six decades, and is recognized as an eminent figure of the institution.

== Career ==
=== Radio ===
Upon joining Radio Pakistan, Riaz Mahmood held multiple positions at the Lahore station, culminating in his retirement as a senior broadcaster in 1997. He was the host of the widely acclaimed radio show Punjabi Darbar. Due to his irreplaceable expertise, Radio Pakistan repeatedly extended his service until 2007. He subsequently continued hosting radio programs on a contract basis from 2007 to 2017.

=== Acting ===
Although known mainly as a producer and broadcaster for Radio Pakistan, Riaz Mahmood also acted in television dramas for Pakistan Television Corporation (PTV). His roles included parts in the Punjabi dramas Tahli Thallay and Uchay Burj Lahore Day, and in the serials Alif Noon, Sooraj Kay Saath Saath, Rahain and Kajal Ghar. He also appeared in the film Bol.

== Awards and recognition ==
- Pride of Performance Award for Riaz Mahmood was announced by the Government of Pakistan on 14 August 2006 and the award was conferred on 23 March 2007. This award was conferred upon him in recognition of his contributions to the field of art and broadcasting.

== Filmography ==
=== Television ===
Year	Drama	Role	Network	Notes
1964	Tahli Thallay		PTV	Punjabi
1974	Uchay Burj Lahore Day	Munshi	PTV	Punjabi
1980	Mai Aur Kamai	Shah Ji	PTV	Anthology: Aur Daramay
1982	Alif Noon	Different roles.	PTV	
1982	Sona Chandi	Doctor Naqvi	PTV	
1983	Tota Kahani	Personal	PTV	Long-play: 9th story
1986	Sooraj Kay Saath Saath	Khawaja Ali Nawaz	PTV	
1990	Aakhri Geet	Chachan	PTV	Long-play
1993	Duniya	Khalid's father	PTV	
1994	Manchalay Ka Sauda	Noor Muhammad	PTV	Episode: 12
1995	Katba	Mulazim Hussain	PTV	Anthology: Kahani Ghar
1995	Red Card	Hameed	PTV	
1998	Rahain	Hakeem	PTV	
2001	Kajal Ghar	Riaz	PTV	Brick manufacturer
2012	Samjhauta Express	Major Upadhyay	PTV	

=== Films ===
Year	Title	Role	Notes
2011	Bol	Zafar Shah	
