= Uzma Gillani =

Pakistani actress

- عظمیٰ گیلانی
- Born: Uzma Begum; 1945 (age 80–81); Meerut, British India
- Occupation: Actress
- Years active: 1964 – present
- Spouse: Inayat Shah Gillani (m. 1965; died 2017)
- Children: 2
- Honours: Pride of Performance Award by the President of Pakistan (1982); PTV Awaard in 1998

Uzma Gillani (born 1945; Urdu: عظمیٰ گیلانی) is a veteran Pakistani television actress. She starred in and made appearances in several television shows in her career beginning in the 1970s.

== Early life ==
Gillani was born in Meerut, British India and her parents migrated to Pakistan.

== Career ==
Gillani is known for her choice of roles that demonstrate a character's tough nature and autocratic disposition. She is considered to be one of the greatest television actors of all time in Pakistan. Gillani began her career through PTV's most successful plays Waris (1979), Dehleez (1981), Panah (1981) and Nangay Paoon (1983), which earned her recognition and a Pride of Performance Award by the President of Pakistan in 1982.

With her career spanning over 60 years, she is one of Pakistan's early TV actresses that gained fame when television emerged in Pakistan in 1964.

== Personal life ==
Gillani married Inayat Shah Gillani and the couple had two children. Her husband died in 2017.

Gillani was diagnosed with cancer but bravely fought the disease and made a full recovery following the treatment.

== Filmography ==
=== Television series ===
Year	Title	Role	Network	Ref(s).
1971	Dada Aur Dil Dada	Hamida	PTV	
1972	Aik Mohabbat Sau Afsanay	Maa	PTV	
1973	Maraat-e-Mohabbat	Zakia	PTV	
1976	Maai Aur Kamai	Amma Shana	PTV	
1978	Manzil Hai Kahan	Ishrat	PTV	
1979	Waris	Zakiya Ghulam Ali	PTV	
1981	Dehleez	Anisa Ahmed	PTV	
1982	Alif Noon	Shadani	PTV	
1982	Doosra Kinara	Malkani	PTV	
1983	Nangay Paoon	Mariam-uz-Zamani	PTV	
1983	Phoolon Wala Rasta	Fozia Ahmed	PTV	
1986	Koi To Ho	Abida	PTV	
1989	Neelay Hath	Zulekha	PTV	
1990	Badaltay Qabil	Lali	PTV	
1992	Nasheman	Farida	PTV	
1994	Alao	Hajra	PTV	
1996	Bari Amma	Bi Amma	PTV	
1998	Shaam Sey Phelay	Yasmeen Ahmed	PTV	
2000	Chamak	Nargis Begum	PTV	
2002	Punkh	Zohra Begum	PTV	
2002	Reshma To Jhalli Hai	Jammi	Indus TV	
2003	Ishq Aatish	Irene	Geo TV	
2003	Chahtain	Fari	Geo TV	
2003	Badlon Par Basera	Fareedoon's mother	PTV	
2004	Maa	Gohar	PTV	
2006	Masuri	Rani	PTV	
2006	Lagan	Faiza's mother	PTV	
2006	Amar Bail	Ammi	TV One	
2007	Man-o-Salwa	Karam's mother	Hum TV	
2008	Sookhey Pattey	Aini	Geo TV	
2009	Kinara Mil Gaya Hota	Mira	TV One	
2009	Tujh Pe Qurban	Razia Sultana	ARY Zindagi	
2012	Bulbulay	Malika	ARY Digital	
2013	Taar-e-Ankaboot	Hazrat Bibi	Geo TV	
2014	Firaaq	Maa Jee	Hum TV	
2015	Maryam	Firdous Begum	Geo Entertainment	
2016	Shehr-e-Ajnabi	Aapa Begum	A-Plus	
2017	Dastar-e-Ana	Zaibunnisa	TV One	
2019	Kaisa Hai Naseeban	Musarrat	ARY Digital	
2019	Bhool	Mrs. Sherazi	ARY Digital	

=== Telefilm ===
Year	Title	Role	Ref.
1981	Panah	Shah Bibi	

=== Film ===
Year	Title	Role	Ref.
2019	Sacch	Uzma	

== Honours ==
The Government of Pakistan named a street and intersection after her in Lahore on August 16, 2021. In 2022 on May 19 the Cantonment Board of Bahawalpur (CBB) named a Park after her called Uzma Gillani Park for children and women in Model Town.

== Awards and recognition ==
Year	Award	Category	Result	Work	Ref(s).
1981	PTV Award	Best Actress	Nominated	Panah	
1982	Pride of Performance	Award by the President of Pakistan	Won	for contributions to Arts	
1998	PTV Award	Best Actress	Won	Shaam Sey Phelay	
2004	3rd Lux Style Awards	Lux Style Award for Best TV Actress - Terrestrial	Nominated	Pataal	
2013	2nd Hum Awards	Hum Award for Best Actor in a Negative Role	Nominated	Firaaq	
