= Rauf Khalid =

Pakistani actor, filmmaker and television writer (1957-2011)

Abdul Rauf Khalid
- عبدالرؤف خالد
- Born: 19 December 1957; Mardan, Khyber Pakhtunkhwa, Pakistan
- Died: 24 November 2011 (aged 53); Sheikhupura, Punjab, Pakistan
- Occupations: Actor; Filmmaker; Screenwriter; Painter
- Years active: 1989–2011
- Spouse: Rubina Khalid
- Awards: Pride of Performance (1995)

Abdul Rauf Khalid (Urdu: عبدالرؤف خالد; 19 December 1957 – 24 November 2011), informally known as Rauf Khalid, was a Pakistani actor, director, producer, writer and painter.

== Early life and education ==
Abdul Rauf Khalid was born on 19 December 1957 in Mardan, Khyber Pakhtunkhwa. While still a college student, he began writing for Radio Pakistan. His radio play Rozgaar ("Livehood") became a popular success and was later adapted for television. He also wrote short stories that were recognized, including Neeli Gurya ("The Blue Doll"). After attending Islamia College University, Peshawar he served as a bureaucrat and serviceman before enterting the entertainment industry.

== Career ==
=== Actor, director, producer and screenwriter ===
In 1989, Khalid wrote and partially directed Madaar ("Axis"), a seven-episode serial exposing drug trafficking, telecast from Pakistan Television Corporation (PTV) - Quetta Center. It has been considered PTV's first thriller. In 1991, he directed Guest House, a 52-episode comedy series. In 1995, he Khalid directed Angar Wadi ("Valley of Burning Coals"), a 15-episode serial based on the Kashmir conflict, for which he was an actor and a producer apart from writing it. In 1998, Khalid made Laag ("Attachment"), a 27-episode serial, again based on Kashmir, which he wrote, directed, produced, and acted in. In 2003, Rauf Khalid released Laaj ("Honor"), his debut movie, a period film set in the British Raj. Although it reportedly did poorly at the box office, it won 12 Bolan Awards, 14 Graduate Awards, 4 National Film Awards, and the Lux Style Awards. In 2008, Khalid made his third television serial, Mishaal ("Beacon"), for which he served as writer, director and producer, which was telecast by national TV network PTV Home on Tuesday evenings in Pakistan.

=== Painter ===
His paintings have been exhibited in the World Fine Art Gallery, New York City and the Omma Art Gallery in Crete, Greece.

=== Cultural and educational work ===
In 2007, Rauf Khalid established a College of TV and Film Direction in Lok Virsa, Shakarparian, Islamabad. He was also the chairman of the National Institute of Cultural Studies, Islamabad.

== Death and legacy ==
Rauf Khalid died on 24 November 2011, aged 53, in a traffic accident near Sheikhupura, Punjab as he was coming to Islamabad from Lahore via the M-2 motorway. He is survived by his wife, senator Rubina Khalid, and their two sons and a daughter. His funeral prayer was offered in Peshawar, Khyber Pakhtunkhwa.

In March 2012, an event was arranged by Lok Virsa of Pakistan to pay tribute to him, which was attended by Minister for Communications Arbab Alamgir Khan, senators Saeeda Iqbal and Saifullah Bangash, among others.

== Filmography ==
=== Television series ===
| Year | Title | Role | Director | Writer | Producer | Network | Ref(s) |
|---|---|---|---|---|---|---|---|
| 1989 | Madaar | No | Yes | Yes | No | PTV | |
| 1991 | Guest House | No | Yes | No | No | PTV | |
| 1994 | Angar Wadi | Captain Hamza Shafee | No | Yes | Yes | PTV | |
| 1998 | Laag | Kailash Agarwal/Huraira | Yes | Yes | Yes | PTV | |
| 2008 | Mishaal | No | Yes | Yes | Yes | PTV Home | |

=== Film ===
| Year | Title | Actor | Director | Writer | Producer |
|---|---|---|---|---|---|
| 2003 | Laaj | Yes | Yes | Yes | Yes |

== Awards and recognition ==
| Type of Award | Name of Award | Notes |
|---|---|---|
| The President of Pakistan award | Pride of Performance Award | In 1995 |
| The Prime Minister of Pakistan award | The Kashmir Medal | For writing TV plays highlighting the plight of the Kashmiri people |
| Bolan Award | Best Director | For the film Laaj (2003) |
| Bolan Award | Best Film | For the film Laaj (2003) |
| Bolan Award | Best Writer | For the film Laaj (2003) |
| Bolan Award | Best Supporting Actor | For the film Laaj (2003) |
| Graduate Guild Award | Best Director | For the film Laaj (2003) |
| Graduate Guild Award | Best Writer | For the film Laaj (2003) |
| Graduate Guild Award | Best Producer | For the film Laaj (2003) |
| Graduate Guild Award | Best Supporting Actor | For the film Laaj (2003) |
| Graduate Guild Award | Best Original Script | For the film Laaj (2003) |
| National Pakistan Award | Best Director | For the film Laaj (2003) |
| National Pakistan Award | Best Film | For the film Laaj (2003) |
| National Pakistan Award | Best Writer | For the film Laaj (2003) |
| National Pakistan Award | Best Original Soundtrack | Shared with Zille Huma |
| Lux Style Awards | Best Film | For the film Laaj (2003) |

== See also ==
- List of Pakistani actors
