= Sangeeta (Pakistani actress) =

Pakistani actress

- سنگیتا
- Born: Parveen Rizvi; 14 June 1958 (age 68); Karachi, Pakistan
- Occupations: Film director; Actress
- Years active: 1969 – present
- Spouse(s): Naveed Akbar Butt (divorced); Humayun Qureshi (divorced)
- Children: 3
- Parent(s): Tayyab Hussain Rizvi (father); Mehtab Rizvi (mother)
- Relatives: See Khan family Kaveeta (sister); Raza Ali Rizvi (brother); Hina Rizvi (sister); Jiah Khan (niece)
- Awards: Nigar Award; Best Director; 1998 Nikah; 1978 Mutthi Bhar Chawal; Best Actress; 1978 Mutthi Bhar Chawal; Special Award; 1976 Society Girl; 1983 Sona Chandi; Best Supporting Actress; 1971 Yeh Aman; 1984 Naam Mera Badnaam
- Honours: Pride of Performance (2023)

Parveen Rizvi, better known as Sangeeta, (Urdu: سنگیتا; born 14 June 1958) is a Pakistani film actress, filmmaker and director of television drama serials.

== Early life ==
Parveen Rizvi was born on 14 June 1958 in Karachi, Pakistan. Her mother Mehtab Rizvi also had a career in show business. Parveen's younger sister, Nasreen Rizvi (professionally known as Kaveeta) is also associated with Pakistani cinema. The late British-American actress Jiah Khan was her niece.

== Career ==
=== Acting ===
In 1969, Sangeeta appeared on the film Koh-e-Noor (1969) as a child star; it was directed by Agha Husaini. In 1971, she moved to Lahore from her birthplace of Karachi and started a more serious career in Lollywood movies in Lahore. Her role as a supporting actress in Riaz Shahid's movie Yeh Aman (1971) was well-liked by the Pakistani public. She went on to act in dozens of other movies before deciding to become a film producer-director with her own film Society Girl in 1976. Sangeeta has over 120 films to her credit as an actress and a producer-director. In 2022 on August 14, she was honored by the Government of Pakistan with the Pride of Performance for her contributions towards the film and television industry.

=== Film directing ===
Sangeeta directed her debut film in 1976, Society Girl, which was a box-office hit. Her second film as director was Mujhay Galay Laga Lo, starring Sangeeta, Kaveeta, Ghulam Mohiuddin, Nayyar Sultana, and Bahar Begum. In 1978, she directed the critically acclaimed film Mutthi Bhar Chawal. Her film Mian Biwi Razi (1982) celebrated its Platinum Jubilee and was a highly successful movie. Her film Thori Si Bewafai was the first Pakistani film to be shot in United States. During the 1990s, she directed commercially successful films like Khilona (1996) and Nikah (1998). In 2019, she directed the romantic film Sirf Tum Hi To Ho.

== Filmography ==
=== As director ===
Year	Film	Language
1976	Society Girl	Urdu
1976	Mujhe Gale Laga Lo	Urdu
1977	Ishq Ishq	Urdu
1978	Mutthi Bhar Chawal	Urdu
1979	Laad Pyar Aur Beiti	Urdu
1980	Mahal Mere Sapnon Ka	Urdu
1982	Mian Biwi Razi	Urdu
1982	Thori Si Bewafai	Urdu
1984	Naam Mera Badnam	Urdu
1985	Jeeney Nahin Dungi	Urdu
1986	Ik Shehanshah	Urdu
1987	Qasam Munnay Ki	Urdu
1988	Shahenshah	Urdu/Punjabi
1989	Taqat Ka Toofan	Urdu
1989	Kalka	Punjabi
1990	Kaali	Urdu
1990	Zehreelay	Urdu
1991	Betab	Urdu
1993	Behroopia	Urdu
1996	Khilona	Urdu
1997	Aashqi Khel Nahin	Urdu
1997	Dream Girl	Urdu
1997	Jeet	Urdu
1998	Ehsaas	Urdu
1998	Nikah	Urdu
1998	Harjai	Urdu
1998	Do Boond Pani	Urdu
1999	Qaid	Urdu
1999	Qismat	Urdu
1999	Dil To Pagal	Urdu
2001	Mere Mehboob	Urdu
2001	Gharana	Urdu
2001	Daldal	Urdu
2002	Jahad	Urdu
2003	Qayamat	Urdu
2003	Remand	Punjabi
2003	Soldier	Urdu
2003	Yeh Wada Raha	Urdu
2005	Daku Haseena	Urdu
2005	Kuriyaan Shehr Diyan	Punjabi
2005	Mustafa Khan	Punjabi
2006	Tarap	Urdu
2006	Athra	Punjabi
2006	Yaar Badmash	Punjabi
2008	Gulabo	Punjabi
2008	Ziddi Badmash	Punjabi
2010	Hakim Arain	Punjabi
2010	Haseeno ka Mela	Punjabi
2012	Chunri	Urdu
2019	Sirf Tum Hi To Ho	Urdu

=== As actress ===
Year	Film	Role	Language	Notes
1969	Koh-e-Noor		Urdu	
1969	Kangan		Urdu	
1971	Yeh Aman		Urdu	
1971	Naag Muni		Urdu	
1972	Baharo Phool Barsao		Urdu	
1973	Khushia	Taaji / Seema	Punjabi	Double role
1973	Baharon Ki Manzil		Punjabi	
1975	Bin Badal Barsaat	Gori	Urdu	
1976	Society Girl	Julie	Urdu	
1984	Pukar		Punjabi	
1986	Joora		Punjabi	
1987	Disco Dancer	Sangeeta	Punjabi	
1989	Kala		Punjabi	
2019	Betabiyan		Urdu	

=== Television series ===
Year	Drama	Network
2010	Dastaan	Hum TV
2011	Kis Din Mera Viyah Howay Ga Season 1	Geo TV
2012	Nikhar Gaye Gulab Sare	Hum TV
2012	Meri Behan Meri Dewrani	ARY Digital
2013	Main Chup Rahungi	TV One
2013	Quddusi Sahab Ki Bewah	ARY Digital
2013	Kis Din Mera Viyah Howay Ga Season 2	Geo Entertainment
2013	Mohabbat Humsafar Meri	TV One
2013	Rehaai	Hum TV
2013	Yeh Shaadi Nahi Ho Sakti	ARY Digital
2013	Kis Din Mera Viyah Howay Ga Season 3	Geo Entertainment
2014	Rishtey	ARY Zindagi
2015	Malaika	Urdu 1
2015	Dil-e-Barbaad	ARY Digital
2016	Haya Ke Daaman Main	Hum TV
2016	Sakeena	A-Plus
2017	Jatan	ARY Digital
2017	Mohabbat Khawab Safar	Hum TV
2017	Larka Karachi Ka Kudi Lahore Di	Express Entertainment
2018	Kis Din Mera Viyah Howay Ga Season 4	Geo Entertainment
2018	Do Biwian Ek Bechara	ARY Digital
2018	Bari Phuppo	A-Plus
2019	Mein Na Janoo	Hum TV
2019	Mera Maan Rakhna	TV One
2019	Abba	PTV Home
2020	Tera Ghum Aur Hum	Hum TV
2020	Qarar	Hum TV
2021	Aslam Ka Gaon	PTV
2021	Pehli Si Muhabbat	ARY Digital
2021	Badnaseeb	Hum TV
2022	Teri Rah Mein	ARY Digital
2022	Sirat-e-Mustaqeem Season 2	ARY Digital
2023	Sotailay	PTV
2023	Qabeel	Aur Life
2023	Dil Pe Zakham Khaye Hain	Hum TV

=== Telefilm ===
Year	Title	Role
2019	Kothi Say Nagan Chowrangi	Amjad's mother
2020	Tuition Wali Tabbassum	Tabbassum's mother

== Awards and recognition ==
Year	Award	Category	Result	Title	Ref.
1971	Nigar Award	Best Supporting Actress	Won	Yeh Aman	
1976	Nigar Award	Special Awards	Won	Society Girl	
1978	Nigar Award	Best Director	Won	Mutthi Bhar Chawal	
1978	Nigar Award	Best Actress	Won	Mutthi Bhar Chawal	
1983	Nigar Award	Special Awards	Won	Sona Chandi	
1984	Nigar Award	Best Supporting Actress	Won	Naam Mera Badnaam	
1998	Nigar Award	Best Director	Won	Nikah	
2020	Pakistan International Screen Awards	Life Time Achievement Award	Won	Contribution to Cinema	
2023	Pride of Performance	Award by the Government of Pakistan	Won	Contribution to Media Industry	
2023	PTV Icon Awards	National Icon Awards	Won	Contribution to Media Industry	
