= Kaveeta =

Pakistani actress

- Born: Nasreen Rizvi; 1960 (age 65–66); Karachi, Pakistan
- Occupation: Actress
- Years active: 1974–1994
- Children: 2
- Parent(s): Tayyab Hussain Rizvi (father); Mehtab Rizvi (mother)
- Relatives: Sangeeta (sister); Hina Rizvi (sister); Raza Ali Rizvi (brother); Jiah Khan (niece)
- Awards: 4 Nigar Awards; Best Supporting Actress

Nasreen Rizvi, also known as Kaveeta, is a Pakistani former film actress who is known for films Tere Mere Sapne (1975), Society Girl (1976), Mohabbat Aur Mehangai (1976), Kabhi Kabhi (1978), Mutthi Bhar Chawal (1978), Mian Biwi Razi (1982) and Qasam (1993).

== Early life ==
Nasreen Rizvi was born in 1960 in Karachi, Pakistan. Her mother Mehtab Rizvi also had a career in the film industry and her father Tayyab Hussain Rizvi was a producer. Kaveeta's elder sister Sangeeta was already associated with Pakistani cinema.

== Career ==
=== Acting ===
She mostly worked in films produced and directed by her elder sister Sangeeta. Kaveeta worked in around 70 films during her 20-year career from 1974 – 1994. In 1994, she quit the Pakistani film industry and decided to settle in the United States.

== Personal life ==
Actress Kaveeta also known as Kavita was born as Nasreen Rizvi. She is the aunt of the late British-American actress Jiah Khan.

== Filmography ==
=== Film ===
- Do Badan (1974)
- Tere Mere Sapne (1975)
- Mujhe Gale Laga Lo (1976)
- Society Girl (1976)
- Mohabbat Aur Mehngai (1976)
- Kabhi Kabhi (1978)
- Mutthi Bhar Chawal (1978)
- Mehndi Lagi Mere Hath (1980)
- Mian Biwi Razi (1982)
- Jeene Nahin Doongi (1985)
- Dakket (1989)
- Manila Ke Janbaz (1989)
- Barood Ki Chhaoon Mein (1989)
- Siren (1990)
- Hijrat (1992)
- Qasam (1993)
- Jungli Mera Naam (1994)

== Awards and recognition ==
Kaveeta won 4 Nigar Awards - first for the film Tere Mere Sapne (1975), then her second one in 1976 for 'Best Supporting Actress' for Society Girl, third in film Jeenay Nahin Doongi and fourth in film Barood Ki Chha (1989).

Year	Award	Category	Result	Title	Ref.
1975	Nigar Award	Best Supporting Actress	Won	Tere Mere Sapne	
1976	Nigar Award	Best Supporting Actress	Won	Society Girl	
1985	Nigar Award	Special Awards	Won	Jeenay Nahin Doongi	
1989	Nigar Award	Best Actress	Won	Barood Ki Chhaoon Mein	
