= Amjad Islam Amjad =

Pakistani poet and lyricist (1944–2023)

Amjad Islam Amjad امجد اسلام امجد PP SI HI
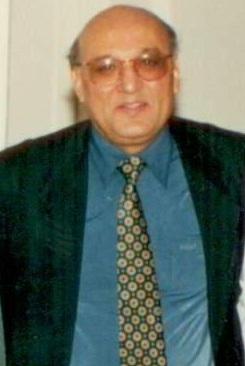
- Amjad in 2012
- Born: 4 August 1944; Lahore, Punjab, British India
- Died: 10 February 2023 (aged 78); Lahore, Punjab, Pakistan
- Education: Government Islamia College Civil Lines, Lahore
- Occupations: Poet, lyricist
- Known for: Poetry, drama, writing, editorial writing
- Spouse: Firdous Amjad
- Children: Ali Zeeshan Amjad
- Awards: Pride of Performance in 1987; Sitara-e-Imtiaz (Star of Excellence) Award (1998) Hilal-i-Imtiaz (Crescent of Excellence) Award by the President of Pakistan (2023)
- Website: amjadislamamjad.com

Amjad Islam Amjad (Note: Urdu: امجد اسلام امجد) (4 August 1944 – 10 February 2023) was a Pakistani Urdu poet, screenwriter, playwright and lyricist.

The author of more than 70 books, he received many awards for his literary work and screenplays for TV, including the Pride of Performance and Sitara-e-Imtiaz (Star of Excellence) awards. He received the prestigious Tamgh-e-Imtiaz in 1998.

== Early life and education ==
Amjad was born in Lahore, Punjab in British India (now Pakistan). His family originally belonged to Sialkot. He received his secondary education in Lahore, and graduated from Government Islamia College Civil Lines, Lahore. He was also member of the college cricket team and participated in the inter-collegiate tournament. He gained a Masters of Arts degree in Urdu literature from Punjab University.

== Career ==
=== Professional career ===
He began his career as a lecturer in Govt. M.A.O. College Lahore. He worked as a director at Pakistan Television Corporation from 1975 to 1979, before returning to teaching.

In 1989, Amjad was appointed Director General of the Urdu Science Board. He also worked as a project director of the Children Library Complex.

=== Literature ===
He wrote many books, columns, translation, criticism and essays, while his main focus remained on writing nazm, a type of Urdu poetry.

=== Television scriptwriter ===
Amjad is the writer of many drama series for Pakistan Television Corporation including Waris. He wrote his first PTV play, Pehla Khel, in 1973 thanks to the recommendation of Athar Shah Khan Jaidi. Among his most notable dramas are Waris, Dehleez, Samandar, Din, Raat, Waqt and Apnay Log.

=== Lyricist ===
He wrote the lyrics of Mann Ki Lagan for the 2003 movie Paap, the song which launched the Bollywood career of Rahat Fateh Ali Khan.

=== Journalism ===
In June 2008, he joined Urdu newspaper Daily Express and wrote column with the title of Chasham-e-Tamasha.

== Illness and death ==
Amjad died from a sudden cardiac arrest on 10 February 2023 in Lahore, Pakistan at the age of 78.

== Legacy ==
Amjad Islam Amjad has been a vital part of the literary world. some of his famous dramas include; Waris, Din, Fishar and many more. He received the prestigious Tamgh-e-Imtiaz in 1998.

He also translated the poetries of the African poets in Urdu called Kale Logon ki Roshan Nazmein.

In December 2019, Amjad received the Necip Fazil International Culture and Art Award in Istanbul, Turkey.

Amjad Islam Amjad also wrote dramas based on criticism. He has been honoured with many national and international awards. He was a member of Blessing for All foundation.

Governor of Punjab, Pakistan, Muhammad Baligh Ur Rehman expressed his grief over Amjad's death by saying:

"Undoubtedly, Amjad Islam Amjad was Pakistan's number one drama writer. He made a name for himself with his unique poetry. Poets and drama writers like him are born after decades".

== Awards and honours ==
- Sitara-i-Imtiaz (Star of Excellence) Award by the President of Pakistan (1998)
- Pride of Performance Award by the President of Pakistan (1987)
- Presidential Iqbal Award (Best Book of Poetry: Fishaar) (1982)
- Writers Guild Award (Best Translation Work: Aks) (1976)
- Best Playwright, PTV Awards (1980, 1984, 1998, 1999 and 2001)
- Karachi Arts Council Award, (Best Book of Prose: Nai Puraney) (1991)
- Special President Award (TV Serial: Waris) (1980)
- Best Nazam Nigar of the Year "Biaaz" Award (2005)
- Best Film Writer Nigar Award (2 Awards) (1982–1987)
- Agfa Award (1987)
- Bolan Award (2 Awards) (1987–1995)
- TV Serial Waris (Published in Chinese Language) (1987)
- TV Serial Waris (Dubbed in Chinese Language & Telecasted on Chinese TV National Network) (1988)
- Amjad Islam Amjad Art & Personality (Compilation Of Writings About Art & Personality of Amjad Islam Amjad) (1996)
- Special Edition of Monthly ”Chahaar Su" (2001)
- Special Edition of Monthly "Biaaz" (2003)
- Jashn-E-Amjad Islam Amjad, Doha- Dubai (2001)
- PTV Awards (12 total including Silver Jubilee Award) (1989)
- Recipient of Graduate Awards (16 Awards total as 'Best Writer') (1975 To 2000)
- National Award, Best Book of Poetry "Sahilon Ki Hawa" (2000)
- Ahmed Nadeem Qasmi Award, Best Book of Poetry "Yaheen Kaheen" (2006)
- 20th Aalmi Frogh-e-Urdu Adab Award (2016)
- Necip Fazil International Culture and Art Award
- Hilal-i-Imtiaz (Crescent of Excellence) Award by the President of Pakistan (2023)

== Bibliography ==
=== PTV drama serials ===
- Waris (1979 to 1980)
- Dehleez (1981)
- Samandar (1983)
- Waqt (1986)
- Fishaar
- Raat
- Din (1992)
- Eendhen
- Inkaar
- Chacha Abdul Baqi (short)
- Daman Ki Aag (short)
- Lahu Meain Phool (short)

=== Private serials ===
- Agar
- Girah
- Zamana
- Bandagi
- Sheeraza
- Sher-Dil

=== Long plays (PTV) ===
- Bazdeed
- Dukhon Ki Chadar
- Apnay Log
- Laikin
- Dhund Ke Uss Par
- Sham Se Pehley
- Nizam Lohaar
- Ghanti
- TV, TV
- Ye Kinara Chala Ke Naau Chali
- Baazgasht
- Abhi Tou Mein Jawan Hun
- Mutthi Se Phisalti Rait
- Aag Sab Ko Jalati Hai
- Johar
- Nazdeek

=== Short plays (25 minutes, PTV) ===
- Jo Yun Hota Tou Kya Hota
- Aap Kal Aaiye
- Taale Mand Ki Pareshaniyan
- Deewar Ke Iss Par-Uss Par
- Makan Ki Talaash Mein
- Shauq Bohat Hai
- Sheesha-O-Sang

=== General plays (50 minutes, PTV) ===
- Aakhri Khawab (1973)
- Barzakh (1974)
- Moum Ki Guriya (1974)
- Khwab Jagtey Hain (1975)
- Ya Naseeb Clinic
- Balkani
- Sauda
- Ahl-E-Nazar
- Shabzad
- Rubaroo
- Suragh E Sahar
- Pichli Raat Ka Chand
- Sawaal
- Mere Bhi Hain Kuch Khwab
- Gardish
- Jaras
- Bachon Ka Bagh
- Ehsas E Ziyan
- Apna Ghar
- Zindagi Ke Miley Mein
- Ulti Churri
- Sooraj Bhi Tamashai
- Paras Pathar
- Doosra Qadam
- Apney Hissey Ka Bhouj
- Tawaan
- Isi Ka Naam Duniya Hai
- Ghairon Se Kaha Tum Ne
- Idher Udher Se
- Zero Point
- Abhi Nahi Kabhi Nahi
- Tasalsul
- Girti Hui Deewar
- Aakhri Tamatar
- Qutab Sitara
- Qafla E Sakht Jan
- Ghar
- Pewasta Reh Shajar Se
- Phir Yun Huwa
- Apni Khudi Pehchaan
- Mere Khawab Reza Reza
- Bakrey Ki Shadi
- Basharat
- Zero Point 2
- Bara Andhera Hai
- Eesaar
- Eid Ka Tohfa

=== Adapted plays ===
- Kan Russ
- Bandagi Bechargi
- Bura Aadmi
- Aks Aur Aainey
- Dehaktey Khwab
- Waris
- Manzil Hai Kahan
- Gard Bad E Hayat
- Rifi Ki Duniya
- Ehsaan
- Sannata
- Baitey Baitiyan
- Amar Bail
- Hisaab
- Summander Ke Nichey
- Dou Gaz Zameen
- Namak Haram
- Ghanti
- Bara Andhera Hai
- Barf Mein Lagi Aag
- Chacha Abdul Baqi
- Lahu Mei Phool

=== Punjabi plays ===
- Nehle Te Dehla
- Khauta Sikka
- Bhukh

=== Plays for children ===
- Jadu Ki Sheeshi
- Bahadur Shehzada
- Daal Mei Kala

=== Stage plays ===
- Ghar Aya Mehmaan
- Dastak
- Kis Ko Keh Rahe Ho

=== Short films ===
- Doosri Taraf
- Beneath The Sea

=== Tele film ===
- Aaina

== Audio albums ==
- Muhabbat Aisa Darya Hai
- Hum Us Ke Hain
- Raat Sammundar Mein
- Mere Bhi Hain Kuch Khawab
- More than 150 of his songs for films, TV And radio have been recorded by singers Nusrat Fateh Ali Khan, Ustad Hamid Ali Khan, folk and sufi songs performer Abida Parveen, ghazal singers Ghulam Ali, Iqbal Bano, Jagjit Singh, Noor Jehan and many other singers.

== Publications ==
| Publication | Type | Year |
|---|---|---|
| Barzakh | Poetry | 1974 |
| Aks | Translation of Modern Resistance Poetry of Palestine | 1976 |
| Saatwan Dar | Poetry | 1978 |
| Waris | TV Serial | 1980 |
| Kalay Logon Ki Roshan Nazmein | Translations of the Blacks' Poetry From US & Africa | 1981 |
| Dehleez | TV Serial | 1982 |
| Fishar | Poetry | 1982 |
| Shaher Der Shaher | Travelogue | 1988 |
| Zara Phir Se Kehna | Poetry | 1988 |
| Aankhon Mein Tere Sapney | Lyrics | 1989 |
| Chashm-E-Tamasha | Columns | 1990 |
| Lahu Mein Phool | Adapted Plays | 1990 |
| Nai Puraney | A new Look on Classic Urdu Poetry | 1991 |
| Apney Log | Long Plays | 1991 |
| In The Last Days Of Autumn | English Translation of Selected Poetry | 1991 |
| Khizaan Ke Akhri Din | Collected Works (Poetry) | 1991 |
| Yeh Afsaney | Selection And Criticism of Short Stories | 1992 |
| Kehkashan | Anthology of Urdu Poetesses | 1992 |
| Us Paar | Poetry | 1992 |
| Resham Resham | Travelogue | 1992 |
| Waqt | TV Serial | 1993 |
| Itne Khwab Kahan Rakhun Gaa | Poetry | 1994 |
| Ya Naseeb Clinic | Comedy Plays | 1995 |
| Khatay Meethay | Columns | 1995 |
| Sapne Baat Nahi Karte | Lyrics | 1995 |
| Din | TV Serial | 1995 |
| Raat | TV Serial | 1995 |
| Samundar | TV Serial | 1997 |
| Baarish Ki Awaz | Poetry | 1997 |
| Dakhtey Chale Gaey | Columns | 1998 |
| Sahar Aasar | Poetry | 1998 |
| Nayi Aankhen Purane Khwab | Columns | 1999 |
| Sapne Kaise Baat Karein | Lyrics | 1999 |
| Jahannam Ki Dasween Gehrai | Translation | 1999 |
| Mere Bhi Hain Kuch Khwab | Collected "Nazmein" | 1999 |
| Hum Us Ke Hain | Collected "Ghazlein" | 1999 |
| Sahilon Ki Hawa | Collected "Ghazlein" | 1999 |
| Sahilon Ki Hawa | Poetry | 2000 |
| Bandagi | TV series | 2001 |
| Chaoon | Columns | 2002 |
| Phir Yun Huwa | Poetry | 2003 |
| Mohabbat Aisa Dariya Hai | Selected Poems | 2004 |
| Saat Din | Travelogue | 2004 |
| Autograph | Selection Of Majeed Amjad's Poetry | 2004 |
| Tere Dhayaan Ki Taiz Hawa | Selected Poems | 2004 |
| Desperate In Love | Selected English Translations | 2004 |
| Love Encompasses All | English Translations | 2005 |
| Yahin Kahin | Poetry | 2006 |
| Teesrey Pehar Ki Dhoop | Columns | 2007 |
| Khwab Jagte Hein | Selected Plays | 2007 |
| Sapno Se Bhari Aankhen | Collected Lyrics | 2008 |
| Chalo Japan Chaltey Hein | Travelogue | 2008 |
| Asbab | Hamd-O-Naat | 2008 |
| Yeh Mera Shehr-Esukhan | Selection of Parveen Shakir's Poetry | 2008 |
| Nazdeek | Poetry | 2009 |
| Dhund Ke Us Paar | Columns | 2009 |
| Raat Samundar Mein | Selection of Ghazals | 2010 |
| Sham Saray | Poetry | 2012 |
| Koi Din Aur | Columns (Condolence) | 2012 |
| Shifting Sands | Translations In English | 2011 |
| Baatein Kerte Din | Poetry | 2014 |
| Kara Bayu | Translations in Turkish | 2014 |
| Cento Poesie D’amore | Translations in Italian | 2014 |
| Geet Hamaray | Songs For Children (3 Volumes) | 2015 |
| Girah | TV Serial | 2017 |
| Chirag E Rehguzar | Columns | 2017 |
| Safar Parey | Travelogues | 2018 |
| Zindagi Ke Meley Mein | Poetry | 2018 |
| Such Ki Talaash Mein | Criticism | 2018 |
| Al Hub-O-Nahar | Translations In Arabic | 2018 |

== See also ==
- List of Pakistani poets
- List of Pakistani writers
- List of Urdu language poets
- List of Urdu language writers
