= Salman Shahid =

Pakistani actor

- Born: 1945 (age 80–81); Lahore, Punjab, British India
- Occupation: Actor
- Years active: 1975–present
- Parent: Khursheed Shahid (mother)

Salman Shahid (Urdu: سلمان شاہد) is a Pakistani film, theatre, television and voice actor.

The son of producer Saleem Shahid and the late veteran actress Khursheed Shahid, he has worked in Lollywood, Bollywood as well as in theatre and television.

He has appeared in the Pakistani Television (PTV) programme Such Gup (1975), the TV shows Taal Matol (1975), Teen Bata Teen (1995) and Hoo Bahoo (2006).

== Career ==
=== Media education and early work ===
In 1976, Pakistan National Council of the Arts (PNCA) gave Salman a scholarship to study film-making in Moscow for four years. He eventually completed his film studies at the prestigious Moscow Film School.

On his return to Pakistan, he work to help establish various drama groups and a drama school.

His series Ababeel (PTV Lahore) and Seerhian (PTV Karachi) were noted, while he also did several noteworthy individual plays as well as direct episodes for the successful TV comedy series Family Front, which aired on PTV in 1997.

=== Direction and screenwriting ===
Salman has been directing plays since his college days, such as Arthur Miller's Death of a Salesman in 1973 and later Luigi Pirandello's Six Characters In Search of an Author in 2007, and, when it comes to television, he wrote, directed and acted in the serial Bano Ko Pehchano (Geo TV) for which he received nominations in all departments of his work at the 2006 Lux Style Awards.

His production Tassadum was selected at the Cairo International Festival of Experimental Theatre.

=== Career in India ===
Salman has acted in films in India, playing a main protagonist in Kabul Express (2006) and the main antagonist in Ishqiya (2010), both films having run the international festival circuit.

== Filmography ==
=== Films ===
Year	Title	Role	Country	Ref
2004	Khamosh Pani	Amin	Pakistan	
2006	Kabul Express	Imran Khan Afridi / Subedar M.J. Mohammad	India	
2010	Ishqiya	Mushtaq Bhai	India	
2014	Dedh Ishqiya	Mushtaq Bhai	India	
2014	Tamanna	Mian Tariq Ali	Pakistan	
2014	Na Maloom Afraad	Gogi	Pakistan	
2016	Teri Meri Love Story	Rana Saheb	Pakistan	
2017	Azad		Pakistan	
2018	Altered Skin	Imtiaz	Pakistan	
2019	Ready Steady No	Chaudhry Saheb	Pakistan	

=== Television serials ===
Year	Title	Role	Channel	Director	Screenwriter	Ref
1975	Such Gup		PTV			
1975	Taal Matol		PTV			
1982	Dhoop Dewar	Asad	PTV			
1982	Alif Noon	different roles.	PTV			
1984	Andhera Ujala	different roles.	PTV			
1985	Apnay Log	Iqtedar Ali	PTV			
1986	Ababeel		PTV			
1988	Seerhian	Kamal	PTV			
1992	Sophia	Imtiaz	PTV			
1995	Zard Dopehar	Nabeel	PTV			
1995	Teen Bata Teen	Kharoos	PTV			
1996	Hairat Kadah "Farar"	Kaleem	PTV			
1997	Family Front		PTV			
1999	Comedy Theater		PTV			
2000	Anokhay Log	Scientist	PTV			
2005	Jaye Kahan Yeh Dil		Geo TV			
2005	Bano Ko Pehchano		Geo TV	Yes	Yes	
2008	Bandiwan	Poet	PTV Home			
2009	Na Jane Kyun		PTV Home			
2010	Noor Bano		Hum TV			
2011	Khuda Aur Muhabbat	Maulvi Aleem	Geo TV			
2012	Mi-Raqsam		Geo TV			
2013	Aseerzadi	Peer Jalal	Hum TV			
2016	Faltu Larki	Anwar-ul-Haq	A-Plus TV			
2017	Shadi Mubarak Ho		Ary Digital			
2017	Mujhay Jeenay Do	Khuda Baksh	Urdu 1			
2017	Bhai	Munner; Ashraf's father	A-Plus TV			
2019	Bewaja		PTV Home			
2019	Tu Zindagi Hai		PTV Home			
2021	Raqeeb Se	Masood	Hum TV			
2023	Tumhare Husn Ke Naam	Qureshi Sahab	Green Entertainment			
2023	Nauroz		Green Entertainment			
2025	Sher	Kaka	Ary Digital			
2026	Bas Tera Saath Ho		Ary Digital			

=== Web series ===
Year	Title	Role	Director	Country	Notes
2024	Barzakh	Jafar Khanzada	Asim Abbasi	Pakistan	Web series on ZEE5

== Awards and nominations ==
Year	Award	Nominated work	Category	Result
2006	5th Lux Style Awards	Bano Ko Pehchano	Best TV Actor (Satellite)	Nominated
2006	5th Lux Style Awards	Bano Ko Pehchano	Best TV Director (Satellite)	Nominated
2015	14th Lux Style Awards	Na Maloom Afraad	Best Film Actor	Nominated
2019	18th Lux Style Awards	Ready Steady No	Best Film Actor	Nominated
