= Asim Bukhari =

Pakistani actor (1944–2026)

Asim Bukhari PP
- عاصم بخاری
- Born: 29 August 1944; Lahore, Punjab, British India
- Died: 11 March 2026 (aged 81); Lahore, Punjab, Pakistan
- Occupations: Actor; Playwright; Poet
- Years active: 1965–2026
- Notable work: Sona Chandi; Ainak Wala Jin; Zard Dopehar; Janjal Pura
- Children: 4, including Ajlal and Moattar
- Awards: Pride of Performance Award (2014)
- Writing career
- Language: Punjabi
- Years active: 1996–2026
- Genre: Poetry
- Subject: Sufism
- Notable works: Dohrian Shaklaan (2000); Soch Udaari; Dil Chirian Da Aahlna

Asim Bukhari (Punjabi, Urdu: عاصم بخاری; 29 August 1944 – 11 March 2026) was a Pakistani television and film actor, and Punjabi poet.

== Early and personal life ==
Asim Bukhari belonged to Lahore. He studied at Lahore, Sargodha and Karachi. He got a job in the National Bank while still studying. He married on 31 March 1974 and had four children.

== Acting career ==
Asim Bukhari started his acting career with Pakistan Television (PTV) in 1965. In his long career, he has acted in more than 50 stage plays, 250 films and more than 600 TV dramas. He hosted a program called "Punjab Rang" for Radio Pakistan. He also wrote plays for radio and TV.

While he acted, a top drama Janjaal Pura, was regarded as one of his most famous works. He also played in another popular drama, Sona Chandi.

His son Ajlal Bukhari and daughter Moattar also acted as child-actors in PTV dramas in the 90s.

== Poetic works ==
Asim Bukhari started Punjabi poetry in 1996. The spiritual dimension of his personality is clearly visible in his poetry. Three collections of his Punjabi poetry "Dohrian Shaklaan", "Soch Udaari", and "Dil Chirian Da Aahlna" were published.

== Awards and recognition ==
- Pride of Performance Award for Asim Bukhari was announced by the Government of Pakistan on 14 August 2014 and the award was conferred on 23 March 2015.
- Punjabi Cultural Award: A special event "An Evening with Asim Bukhari" was organized by Punjab Institute of Language Art and Culture on 20 June 2019. In this prestigious event, he was honored with the "Punjabi Cultural Award" in recognition of the promotion of Punjabi language, literature and Punjabi Sufi poetry.

== Death ==
Bukhari died in Lahore on 11 March 2026. His son, Ajlal Bukhari, confirmed the news on social media.

== Filmography ==
=== Television series ===
Year	Drama	Role	Channel	Notes
1965	Karay Ka Ghar		PTV	
1966	Lakhon Main Teen		PTV	
1970s	Bhola Khanjar		PTV	
1970s	Ali Baba Chalees Chor	Ali Baba	PTV	
1975	Shanna-e-Saba	without name	PTV	Aik Mohabbat Sau Afsanay
1975	Zood-e-Pasheman	without name	PTV	Aik Mohabbat Sau Afsanay
1975	Daze Kol	Saith	PTV	Aik Mohabbat Sau Afsanay
1980	Teesra Kinara	Ameer-ud-Din	PTV	
1981	Zindgi Bandgi	Doctor	PTV	Long-play: Drama 81
1981	Darwaza	Sultan's father	PTV	Long-play: Drama 81
1981	Dehleez		PTV	
1982	Sarab	Doctor	PTV	Long-play: Drama 82
1982	Antique Shop Main	Customer	PTV	Anthology: Alif Noon
1982	Eye Clinic Main	Patient's father	PTV	Anthology: Alif Noon
1982	Insurance Main	Insurance agent	PTV	Anthology: Alif Noon
1982	Township Main	Owner	PTV	Anthology: Alif Noon
1983	Sona Chandi	Shamas	PTV	
1983	Anjanay Main	Samia's father	PTV	Long-play: Drama 83
1983	Wadi-e-Purkhar	Professor	PTV	Long-play: Drama 83
1983	Pholon Wala Rasta	Mohsin	PTV	Long-play: Drama 83
1984	Dukhon Ki Chadar	Chauhdry Niaz	PTV	Long-play: Drama 84
1984	Status	Nasir	PTV	Long-play: Drama 84
1984	Zindgi	Professor	PTV	Anthology: Andhera Ujala
1984	Sanpolia	Faizan's father	PTV	Anthology: Andhera Ujala
1984	Naseeb	Naseer	PTV	Anthology: Andhera Ujala
1984	Zar Zameen	Afzal Ahmad	PTV	Anthology: Andhera Ujala
1984	Awaz	Ahsan	PTV	Anthology: Andhera Ujala
1984	Akaas Bail	Rahim Bakhsh	PTV	Anthology: Andhera Ujala
1984	Mojza	Altaf	PTV	Anthology: Andhera Ujala
1984	Mirza And Sons	Chauhdry Rehmat Ullah	PTV	Long-play: Drama 84
1984	Sahil	Malik Manzoor	PTV	
1985	Tota Kahani	Saeen Rahat	PTV	Long-play: 11th story
1985	Apnay Log	Kulsoom's father	PTV	Long-play: Drama 85
1985	Dasht-e-Tanhai	Farasat Ali	PTV	Long-play: Drama 85
1985	Dubai Chalo	Peter	PTV	Long-play: Drama 85
1986	Fehmida Ki Kahani Ustani Rahat Ki Zubani	Lawyer	PTV	Long-play: Drama 86
1986	In Se Miliay	Danish	PTV	Long-play: Drama 86
1986	Khwabon Ka Jungle	Hashmi	PTV	Long-play: Drama 86
1986	Lekin	Fazal Hussain	PTV	Long-play: Drama 86
1986	Rishtay Aur Rastay	Qasim Baig	PTV	Chinese Collaboration
1986	Hazaron Raaste	Doctor	PTV	
1987	Dhund Ke Us Paar	Mateen	PTV	Long-play: Drama 87
1988	Sooraj Kay Sath Sath	Sardar Khan	PTV	
1988	Bakht Nama	Major William	PTV	
1988	Do Dhari Talwar	Fazal Kareem	PTV	Anthology: Band Gali
1988	Mama Seemi	Uncle Rehbar	PTV	Anthology: Band Gali
1989	Hisar	Talib Hussain	PTV	
1989	Neelay Hath	Noman Siddiqui	PTV	
1990	Khoji		PTV	
1991	Ghar Se Niklay	Bukhari	PTV	
1991	Ghenti	Sultan Ali	PTV	Long-play
1992	Haveli	Nasir's father	PTV	
1992	Rustam Aur Sohrab	Noor Anwar	PTV	Long-play
1992	Wisal	Qadir	PTV	Kashmir based, Long-play
1992	Nashaib	Shaikh Mazhar-ud-Din	PTV	
1993	Ainak Wala Jin	Bazurg	PTV	
1993	Khuwahish	Rasheed	PTV	
1994	Mann Chalay Ka Souda	Chauhdri Nazeer	PTV	Episode: 3
1994	Takmeel	Professor	PTV	Long-play: Tele Theater
1994	Lawrence Of Thalebia	Malik	PTV	Anthology: Qasimi Kahani
1994	Adam Zaad	Master Wan Tang	PTV	Anthology: Hairat Kadah
1994	Paigham Zubani Aur Hai	Anwaar	PTV	Anthology: Hairat Kadah
1994	Daldal	Masood	PTV	
1995	Zard Dopehar	Jawad	PTV	
1995	Akhri Kirdar	Tariq Naseem Qureshi	PTV	Anthology: Suragh
1995	Uran	Darwesh Kamal	PTV	PIA series
1996	Zaroorat	Seerat Mirza	PTV	
1996	Foul Play	Baig Sahib/Refree	PTV	Long-play
1996	Apnay Aur Sapnay	Sufi Nazeer	PTV	Long-play
1996	Mein Ik Darya Ke Paar Utra	Editor	PTV	Long-play
1996	Lab-e-Sahil	Chief Secretary II	PTV	Long-play
1996	Heer Ranjha	Ajju Chauhdry	PTV	Long-play
1996	Ranjish	Sadiq	PTV	
1996	Janjal Pura	Sheikh Shiraakat	PTV	
1997	Rehaai	Baba Manni	PTV	Anthology: Sachi Kahanian
1997	Family Front	Malik Iqbal	PTV	Sitcom
1997	Pathar Ka Chand	Munshi Siraj Din	PTV	
1998	Ghulam Gardish	Nawazish Ali	PTV	
1998	Musafatain		PTV	
1999	Dhund	Siddiqui	PTV	Telefilm
1999	Parchhayen	Bukhari	PTV	
1999	Ghareeb-e-Shehar	Political leader	PTV	
2000	Us Paar	Malik/Baba Jani	PTV	Docudrama
2001	Bila Unwan	Mazhar Ali Khan	PTV	Telefilm
2001	Kajal Ghar	Hakeem Abdullah	PTV	
2002	Nazdeek		PTV	Long-play
2003	Shampak Shoo	Shair Sultan	PTV	
2003	Shanakht	Turkey Baba	PTV	
2003	Dil Ye Kehta Hai		PTV	
2003	Babay	Mirza	PTV	Long-play
2004	Ta Hadd-e-Nigah	Laajpat	PTV	Kashmir based, Long-play
2006	Malangi	Shah Sahib	PTV	
2007	Ibn-e-Adam	Lawyer	ARY Digital	
2009	Saray Gamay	Maulana Shams-ud-Din	PTV	
2010	Pal Bhar Main		ATV	
2011	Chand Mera Bhi To Hey	Baba Garvi Wala	PTV	
2012	Bano Bazar	Agha Ji	Geo Entertainment	
2012	Maya	Noorani	ARY Digital	
2015	Aik Sitam Aur Sahi	Syed Sabtain Shah	Express Entertainment	
2015	Be Parwahian		PTV	
2016	Akeli Reh Gai Mein		Aaj Entertainment	
2016	Mohabbat Behta Darya	Aziz	TV One	
2017	Rani	Shah Ji	Geo Entertainment	
2019	Tootay Pattay	Agha Ji	PTV	
2019	Apni Jannat	Sheikh Sahib	Inner Pakistan	Web series
2020	Ghenti	Doctor	PTV	Kashmir based, Short-play
2022	Ishq Pagal Karay	Waheed	TV One	
2022	Qalandar	Baba Ji	Geo Entertainment	
2023	Sehan	Khairoo Baba	PTV	

=== Punjabi dramas ===
Year	Drama	Role	Channel	Notes
1974	Aapay Ranjha Hoi		PTV	
1995	Jhalla	Haji Ikhlaq	PTV	Anthology: Ajj Di Kahani
1995	Beopari	Master Fazal	PTV	Anthology: Ajj Di Kahani
1995	Kalay Karmaan Walay	Chauhdry Muhammad Ali	PTV	Anthology: Ajj Di Kahani
1996	Treth		PTV	Long-play
1997	Hook	Police officer	PTV	
1999	Laat		PTV	
2004	Wadi Eid	Haneef	PTV	Long-play
2006	Agg Da Darya	Chauhdry Hayat MPA	Apna Channel	
2007	Makaan Tay Makeen	Baba Jee	PTV	Anthology: Jag Beeti
2007	Saya	Saleem	PTV	Anthology: Jag Beeti
2007	Pachhtaway Di Agg	Afzal	PTV	Anthology: Jag Beeti
2007	Zaat Da Qarz	Master Ameen	PTV	Anthology: Jag Beeti
2007	Jugnoo	Professor	PTV	Anthology: Jag Beeti
2007	Rasmaan	Malik Jameel	PTV	Anthology: Jag Beeti
2007	Oukhay Painday	Peer Jee	PTV	
