= Shahid Nadeem =

Pakistani writer and director

- شاہد ندیم
- Born: Shahid Mahmood Nadeem; 1947 (age 78–79); Sopore, Kashmir, British India
- Occupations: Human rights activist, journalist, playwright, screenwriter, theatre director, television director
- Years active: 1970s to present
- Employer(s): PTV (DMD); Ajoka Theater (executive director)
- Notable work: Toba Tek Singh (1992); Zard Dopehar (1995); Uraan (1995); Janjal Pura (1996); Bullah (2001); Burqavaganza (2008); Kaun Hai Yeh Gustakh (2012)
- Spouse: Madeeha Gauhar (wife)
- Children: Savera Nadeem (daughter); Nirvaan Nadeem (son); Sarang Nadeem (son)
- Relatives: Faryal Gohar (sister-in-law)
- Awards: List of awards

Shahid Mahmood Nadeem (Punjabi, Urdu: شاہد محمود ندیم; born 1947) is a Pakistani journalist, playwright, screenwriter, theater and television director, and human rights activist.

He served as the general manager, program director, and deputy managing director of the Pakistan Television Corporation. He is currently director of the Ajoka Theater as well as the PTV Academy.

== Early life ==
Shahid Nadeem was born to a Muslim family in 1947, during the partitioning of British India, in Sopore, Kashmir, to a well-known doctor; the family later settled in Lahore, Punjab.

== Career ==
Nadeem began his career as a human rights and social activist in Lahore. During the era of Muhammad Zia-ul-Haq, he was imprisoned three times in 1969, 1970, and in 1979 for his political activism. In 1980, he was forced to go abroad and moved to London where he worked for Amnesty International between 1980 and 1988, from 1991 to 1993 in Hong Kong, and then in Los Angeles.

Nadeem has directed and written plays for the theater as well as a number of TV series, most of them for PTV. The majority of his plays are written in Urdu and Punjabi. He has adapted a few English plays. Nadeem writes for newspapers, among them The Express Tribune.

In 1995, Nadeem directed and wrote two television serials for the Pakistan Television Corporation including Neelay Hath. One of them is the political drama Zard Dopehar which aired on PTV and starred Shujaat Hashmi and Samina Peerzada. The story centres around a corrupt politician who grew up in a typical middle-class family.

The other, Uraan, aired in the same year on PTV and was very popular. It focused on the culture and management at Pakistan International Airlines (PIA). It was shot mostly at the Jinnah International Airport, Karachi, but some of it was filmed in Kathmandu, London, Nairobi, New York City, and Paris. Shakeel played the lead as a PIA aircraft captain and Faryal Gohar as a senior flight purser.

Nadeem wrote a hit comedy television series Janjaal Pura for PTV during the 2000s. The serial was directed by Tariq Jamil and starred Savera Nadeem, Mehmood Aslam and Naseem Vicky.

On 23 August 2008, the Alhamra Arts Council hosted the launch of Selected Plays published by Oxford University Press (OUP) with the help of Ajoka. The book contains seven of his famous plays: Teesri Dastak, Barri, Aik Thi Nani, Kala Meda Bhes, Dukhini, Bulha and Burqavaganza. The book was also launched at the Pakistan National Council of the Arts (PNCA), Islamabad on 25 August 2008 with the help of the Pakistan Academy of Letters. Two collections of his Urdu and Punjabi plays have been published.

In 2012 Nadeem wrote a play Kaun Hai Yeh Gustakh, directed by Madeeha Gauhar, which was first performed at the Alhamra Arts Council in Lahore on 14 December 2012 by the Ajoka Theater group. The play is based on the life of Saadat Hassan Manto and was well received by audiences. Manto was played by Naseem Abbas. In January 2013 the play was presented at the Akshara Theatre in New Delhi, India. It was due to be presented at the National School of Drama (NSD) in New Delhi but was cancelled due to security concerns. In February 2013, Kaun Hai Yeh Gustakh was performed at Nishtar Hall, Peshawar by Ajoka.

In 2013, Nadeem started writing the script for the television serial Main Manto based on the life of Saadat Hasan Manto. The series is directed by Sarmad Sultan Khoosat, with Sarmad Khoosat playing the lead; he is supported by Mahira Khan and Saba Qamar. The film screened all over Pakistan to critical acclaim.

== Personal life ==
Nadeem has a daughter, Savera Nadeem, from his first marriage who is a television actress. Later Nadeem married Madeeha Gauhar and has two sons, Sarang and Nirvaan, the latter being a TV, film and theatre actor/director, who has also written columns for The Nation. Nadeem and Gauhar first met in London when Shahid was working at Amnesty International and Gauhar was on a study scholarship from the British Council.

== Books ==
- Selected Plays. Oxford: Oxford University Press, 2008 ISBN 978-0-19-547477-0.

== Filmography ==
=== Films ===
Films
Year	Title	director	screenWriter	Notes
2003	Shararat	No	Yes	
2015	Manto	No	Yes	

=== Plays ===
Plays
Year	Title	Director	Writer	Notes
1985	Chalk Chakkar	No	Yes	Adaption of The Caucasian Chalk Circle by Bertolt Brecht
1987	Barri	No	Yes	
1987	Marya Hoya Kutta	No	Yes	
1988	Itt	Yes	Yes	
1989	Choolah	No	Yes	
1990	Jhali kithay jaway	No	Yes	
1991	Teesri Dastak	No	Yes	
1992	Lappar	No	Yes	
1992	Toba Tek Singh	No	Yes	Adaption of Toba Tek Singh by Saadat Hasan Manto
1992	Dekh Tamasha Chalta Ban	No	Yes	
1993	Ek Thi Nani	No	Yes	
1995	Jum Jum Jeeway Jaman Pura	No	Yes	
1995	Uraan			
1998	Bala King	No	Yes	
2000	Dukhini	No	Yes	
2001	Bullah			
	Adhoori	No	Yes	
	Mainoon Kari Kareenday Ni Mae	No	Yes	
2001	Bullah	No	Yes	
	Border Border	No	Yes	
2006	Dushman	No	Yes	
2006	Maon Ke Naam	No	Yes	
2008	Burqavaganza	Yes	Yes	
2008	Hotel Mohenjodaro	Yes	Yes	
2010	Dara	Yes	Yes	
2011	The Dreams Can Come True	No	Yes	
2011	Dukh Darya	No	Yes	
2011	Kala Meda Bhes			
2011	Mera Rang De Basanti Chola	No	Yes	
2011	Amrika Chalo	Yes	Yes	
2012	Rozan-e-Zindan Se	No	No	Editor and selector of the play
2012	Kaun Hai Yeh Gustakh	No	Yes	

=== Television ===
Television
Year	Title	Director	screenWriter	Notes
1995	Zard Dopehar	Yes	Yes	
1995	Uraan	Yes	Yes	
1997	Janjaal Pura	No	Yes	
2013	Main Manto	No	Yes	

== Awards and nominations ==
Year	Award	Category	Work	Result
1989	PTV Silver Jubilee Award			Won
2001	PEN International	Fellowship		Won
2005	Masood Khadarpoosh Award		Bulha	Won
2010	Pride of Performance Award	Literature	Playwright	Won
