= Ghayyur Akhtar =

Pakistani actor

- غیُور اختر
- Born: 5 October 1945; Lahore, Punjab, British India
- Died: 7 February 2014 (aged 68); Lahore, Punjab, Pakistan
- Occupations: Actor, producer, director, screenwriter
- Height: 6.0 ft (183 cm)
- Children: Hamza Ghayyur Akhtar
- Awards: Tamgha-e-Imtiaz (Medal of Excellence) by the Government of Pakistan in 2003; Pride of Performance by President of Pakistan in 2009

Ghayyur Akhtar (Punjabi, Urdu: غیُور اختر, 5 October 1945 – 7 February 2014) was a Pakistani radio, television, film and theater actor. He also worked as a writer, director and producer.

He is best known for playing a role in the television serial Sona Chandi (1982).

== Early life and education ==
Akhtar was born on 5 October 1945 in Lahore, Punjab, British India. He received his Bachelor of Arts degree from the University of the Punjab in Lahore.

His younger brother Zill-e-Subhan was also an actor.

== Career ==
=== Actor ===
He began his acting career in the 1970s with Radio Pakistan.

He was known as "Hameed Bhai (O Ho Ho Ho)" from his performance on the television serial Sona Chandi and Chacha Barkat from Radio Pakistan because of his "O Ho Ho Ho" dialogue.

He shifted his career to television in the 1980s and appeared on PTV classic serials like Sona Chandi, Khawaja and Son, Waris and soaps like Ainak Wala Jin.

He also appeared in mainstream cinema in Direct Hawaldar (1985), but television drama remained his major field.

He also appeared on the Din News political talk show Wah Wah as a Chaudary for over a year.

=== Screenwriter ===
He wrote stage plays, including Kutkutarian.

== Death ==
Akhtar died on 7 February 2014 in Lahore at age 68, after prolonged illness and was laid to rest at Mian Mir Graveyard in the city.

== Legacy and recognition ==
In recognition of his services in media, writer and columnist Munnu Bhai wrote two columns called Gir-e-Baan in his honour.

Akhtar was decorated with a Pride of Performance award in 2009 as well as Tamgha-e-Imtiaz.

== Television series ==
Year	Title	Role	Network	Notes
1975	Ghareeb-e-Shehar	Safdar	PTV	Aik Mohabbat Sau Afsany
1975	Madan-e-Mohabbat	Khaleel	PTV	Aik Mohabbat Sau Afsany
1979	Waris	Hayat Muhammad	PTV	
1980	Alif Laila	Jinn	PTV	
1981	Dehleez	Taj Deen	PTV	
1982	Sona Chandi	Hameed	PTV	
1982	Alif Noon	Different roles	PTV	
1984	Aankh Macholi	Babu Ji	PTV	
1985	Apnay Log	Mooda Pehlwan	PTV	
1985	Khawaja and Son	Javed	PTV	
1985	Waqt	Chaudhry	PTV	
1986	Koi To Ho	Habib	PTV	
1986	Khawabon Ka Jungle	Karinda	PTV	
1988	Sooraj Ke Sath Sath	Imam Deen	PTV	
1989	Pyas	Inspector Rab Nawaz	PTV	
1990	Bau Train	Passenger	PTV	
1991	Pat Jhar	Sajjad Ali	PTV	
1992	Din	Habib	PTV	
1992	Jhalla	Sheikh Saleem	PTV	Anthology: Ajj Di Kahani
1992	Rahai	Sheeda	PTV	Anthology: Ajj Di Kahani
1992	Hath Ghari	Sheikh	PTV	Anthology: Ajj Di Kahani
1992	Welhay Masroof	Taya	PTV	Anthology: Ajj Di Kahani
1993	Sifarish	Rehman	PTV	Anthology: Raas
1993	Fareb	Naseem Khan	PTV	
1993	Ainak Wala Jin	Samri Jadoogar	PTV	
1995	Zard Dopehar	Police Officer	PTV	
1995	Khawab Azab		PTV	
1996	Aisi Bulandi Aisi Pasti	Quraishi	PTV	Anthology: Hairat Kada
1996	Adam Zad	Sain Kharoji Wala	PTV	Anthology: Hairat Kada
1996	Ranjish	Lala Ji	PTV	
1996	Ghar Galian Aur Rastay		PTV	
1996	Heer Ranjha	Ranjha's brother	PTV	Telefilm
1996	Lab-e-Sahil	Zamindar	PTV	Telefilm
1997	Family Front		PTV	Sitcom
1997	Pathar Ka Chand	Chaudhry Kareem	PTV	
1997	Manjdhar	Jaggu	PTV	
1997	Hook	Sardar Kamal	PTV	
1998	Rahain	Chaudhry Akbar	PTV	
1998	Amber Maria	Aaqa Kharkaash	PTV	
1998	Kala Dayra		PTV	
1999	Jan Khatra-e-Jan	Doctor	PTV	Comedy Theater
1999	Budha Trunk Aur Boski	Jeera	PTV	Comedy Theater
2000	Us Paar	Malik Hakim	PTV	
2000	Dopatta	Khateeb	PTV	
2000	Inkar		PTV	
2001	Dehleez	Rehmat	PTV	Short-play
2001	Muskrahat	Malik Ehsaan	PTV	
2001	Hawa Pe Raqs	G.M	PTV	
2001	Jaza Saza		PTV	
2002	Nigah	Roshan	PTV	
2003	Pappoo Plaza	Dilbar Changaizi		Sitcom
2004	Gali Main Mach Gaya Shor	Mhooda		
2004	Ruton Kay Aanchal		PTV	
2004	Saiban Sheeshay Ka	Malik	PTV	
2005	Penda	Mojoo Malik	PTV	
2006	Jannat Pur		PTV	
2007	Jheel	Malik Sajawal	PTV	
2007	Junoo Main Jitni Bhi Guzri	Habib	PTV	Telefilm
2007	Naal Meray Koi Challay	Chaudhry Hakim	PTV	
2008	Wehray Aa War Meray	Chaudhry	PTV	Anthology: Jag Beeti
2009	Saray Gamay	Chhammi Pehalwan	PTV	
2009	Afsar Be Kar-e-Khas		PTV	
2011	Girjaan		PTV	Telefilm
2011	Sohail Clinic		ATV	
2011	Dhee Rani	Chaudhry Salamat	PTV	

== Awards ==
- Pride of Performance Award by the President of Pakistan in 2009
- Tamgha-e-Imtiaz Award in 2003
- Graduate Award [Two times each from Radio Pakistan (1990–91) and TV (1986–87)]
- Graduate Award (2001–02, Radio Pakistan)
- Pakistan Broadcasting Corporation (1999–2000, Organized by Radio)
- PTV Regional Award for Drama Artist (2002–2003).
- Asian Award (1993–94, PTV)
- Musawar Award (1991–92, PTV)
- Bahoo Award (1993–94, PTV)
- Shezan Award (1994–95, PTV)
