= Tauqeer Nasir =

Pakistani actor

- توقیر ناصر
- Born: 14 September 1957 (age 69); Dera Ghazi Khan, Punjab, Pakistan
- Education: Master's degree in Mass Communications, University of the Punjab
- Occupations: Actor, presenter, former Director General of Pakistan National Council of the Arts (2009 - 2011)
- Years active: 1978 – present
- Organization(s): Pakistan Television Corporation, Pakistan National Council of Arts
- Awards: Pride of Performance by President of Pakistan; Tamgha-e-Imtiaz (Medal of Excellence) Award by the Government of Pakistan in 1999

Tauqeer Nasir (Punjabi, Urdu: توقیر ناصر) is a Pakistani actor who has mostly worked in television, in Urdu as well in Punjabi.

He has served as Director General of Pakistan National Council of Arts for two years.

== Early life and education ==
Tauqeer Nasir was born in Dera Ghazi Khan. He finished his basic education in the cities of Dera Ghazi Khan, Muzaffargarh and Multan. He graduated with a master's degree in Mass Communications from Punjab University, Lahore in 1981. Before joining the entertainment industry he had aimed to join the Pakistan Armed Forces.

== Career ==
He started his career in 1978 with Pakistan Television Corporation (PTV).

== Awards and recognition ==
- Pride of Performance
- Tamgha-e-Imtiaz (Medal of Excellence) Award by the Government of Pakistan in 1999.
- Nominee: Best Actor Drama Series in The 1st Indus Drama Awards 2005 for Maa Aur Mamta (Mazloom)
- Hilal-i-Muzaffargarh Award in 2019.

== Filmography ==
=== Television ===
Year	Title	Role	Network	Notes
1978	Parwaaz	–	PTV	Acting debut.
1979	Alif Laila	Abid	PTV	Episode: Shahi Nishani
1981	Dehleez	Nasir	PTV	Social drama exploring family and societal dynamics.
1981	Kaanch Ka Pul	Gullu	PTV	Long-play Drama 81
1981	Mata-e-Ghuroor	Gullu	PTV	Long-play Drama 81
1982	Sona Chandi	Popa	PTV	Hugely popular serial that brought him national recognition.
1983	Samundar	Tanveer	PTV	
1983	Anjany Main	Babar	PTV	Long-play Drama 83
1984	Khul Ja Sim Sim	–	PTV	Long-play Drama 84
1984	Nasoor	Qaidi Number 9	PTV	Anthology: Andhera Ujala
1985	Raat Gaye	Hameed	PTV	Long-play Drama 85
1985	Dard Aur Darmaan	Wazeer	PTV	Long-play Drama 85
1987	Darya	Sanwal	PTV	Drama about the emotional journey of characters living in the Cholistan desert.
1988	Zangar	Amir Sheikh	PTV	
1990	Fishaar	Waleed	PTV	A youth-centered drama directed by Ayub Khawar.
1990	Raig Zaar	Imtiaz	PTV	Play about complexities of feudalism, power struggles, and human greed.
1992	Phul Pathar	Arshad	PTV	Anthology: Qissa Kahani
1992	Saver Da Bhulea	–	PTV	Anthology: Qissa Kahani
1992	Kalay Karmaan Walay	Kala	PTV	Anthology: Qissa Kahani
1993	Sifarish	Aftab	PTV	Anthology: Raas
1993	Kashkol	Mehmood	PTV	Played a morally conflicted character in this acclaimed social drama.
1995	Raiza Raiza	Muneer	PTV	
1995	Hamaam Main	Mohsin Adeel	PTV	Long-play Kahani Ghar
1996	Ishq Ka Ain	Peer Bakhsh	PTV	
1996	Dastak	Qaiser	PTV	Long-play
1998	Rahain	Zahoor Bhatti	PTV	Played a village elder caught between rural traditions and urban change.
1998	Jeet	Nasir	PTV	
1998	Kala Dayra	–	PTV	
1999	Parchhayen	Jamal	PTV	
1999	Chandpur Ka Chandoo	Deewan Ferozi	PTV	
1999	Kikar Kanday	Shafiq	PTV	Punjabi drama directed by Sharafat Ali Naqvi.
1999	Baal-o-Par	Maulvi Sahib	PTV	
1999	Ghareeb-e-Shehar	Aslam	PTV	
2002	Landa Bazar	Yawar Kamal	PTV	Iconic Punjabi-language role portraying a complex patriarch.
2004	Dil Hai Ke Diya Hai	Daniyal	PTV	
2004	Aag	Sabir	PTV	
2004	Tapdi Chhaan	–	PTV	Punjabi drama
2005	Kaun Hai	Khawar	PTV	Telefilm
2005	Kuch Bhi Na Kaha	Mohi-ud-din	PTV	Telefilm
2007	Koi Tay Hai	Mehmood Nishtar	Apna TV	
2009	Yaad Piya Ki Aye	Faraz	PTV	
2010	Jinhain Rastay Main Khabar Hui	–	PTV	
2012	Thakan	Kaashan Azmat	ARY Digital	Featured as a father struggling with generational change.
2013	Dil Awaiz	Meer Amraiz	PTV Home	Played a key supporting role in a family-centered serial.
2017	Namak	Sikandar Hayat	PTV Home	
2017	Khamoshi	Sabir	Hum TV	Portrayed an emotionally layered father figure.
2017	Laal Ishq	Yawar Kamal	A-Plus	Reprised his role from Landa Bazar in this sequel series.
2018	Visaal	Shabbeer	ARY Digital	
2018	Bisaat e Dil	Malik	Hum TV	
2020	Jhooti	Akbar	ARY Digital	
2020	Humraaz	Ahmed	Apna TV	

=== Films ===
Year	Title	Role	Language	Notes
1990	Qayamat ke Baad	Hamid	Punjabi	Played an investigative journalist, the movie was written by Syed Noor.
