= Savera Nadeem =

Pakistani actress, producer and director (born 1974)

Savera Arham Nadeem
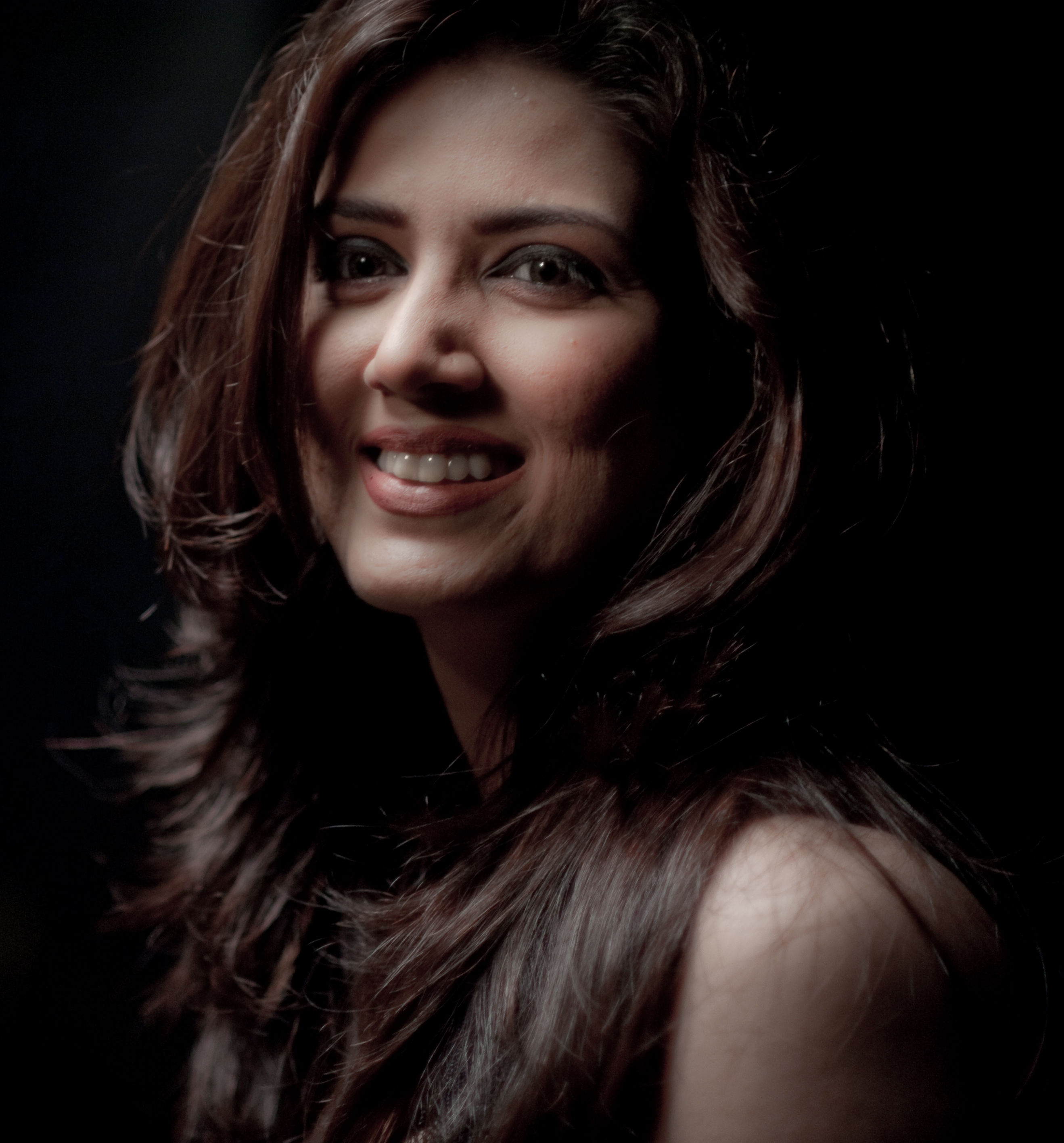
- Born: 1974 (age 51–52); Lahore, Punjab, Pakistan
- Occupations: Actor; producer; director
- Years active: 1995–present
- Children: 2
- Parents: Shahid Nadeem (father); Madeeha Gauhar (stepmother)
- Relatives: Faryal Gohar (aunt)

Savera Nadeem (Punjabi: سویرا ندیم) is a Pakistani actress, producer, and director. Primarily known for her work on television; she also acted in theatre and films. Nadeem received a Lux Style Award for Best Television Actress and five nominations.

== Early life ==
Savera Nadeem was born in 1974 to a Kashmiri family in Lahore. Her father, Shahid Nadeem, is a prominent journalist. She has a Masters in English Literature from Kinnaird College, Lahore, and studied directing at the National School of Drama, Delhi. Nadeem also has a background in classical music.

== Career ==
=== Acting ===
Nadeem started acting when she was fifteen, with her first appearance in the drama Kiran, being broadcast in 1989. She subsequently had the lead role in Ayub Khawar's directed social-issue drama Inkaar. For her performance in the series, Nadeem won the PTV Award for Best Actress. In 1995, she played a gynecologist appointed in a small neighborhood in the dark comedy Janjal Pura.

In 2010, Nadeem appeared in the drama Diya Jalay as a wife caught in an abusive marriage. A reviewer from Dawn opined that she "not only emotes well but looks smashing". Later that year, she portrayed a self-sacrificing housewife struggling emotionally in the drama Qaid-e-Tanhai. Nadeem won Lux Style Award for Best TV Actress for her performance at the 11th Lux Style Awards.

In 2012, Nadeem played the titular role of the rigid and dictatorial Zubeida in the drama Bari Aapa. She was drawn to the project due to the character and the gripping dialogues. She then appeared in the drama Mera Yaqeen, portraying a bedridden, paralysed housewife grappling with her husband's romantic affair with her best friend. While reviewing the series for The Express Tribune, reviewer Altaf Hussain found that she "steals the scenes whenever she appears on screen".

In 2015, Nadeem played a cameo role in her second film, the biographical-drama Manto. Based on the life of eminent Urdu writer Saadat Hassan Manto, Nadeem portrayed a tanga puller, a character wrote by the writer himself in one of his short stories.

In 2022, Nadeem played the manipulative and sly matriarch in the mystery-thriller Wehem. Nadeem was agreed to the project due to the unique character traits. In 2023, she played a malevolent stepmother of the male protagonist in the romance Jaan-e-Jahan. The performance received positive reviews from critics.

=== Producer and director ===
Nadeem's first job as director was on Kal, a telefilm starring Saba Qamar and Fawad Khan that aired on PTV and Geo TV in 2006. Subsequently, she directed thirteen episodes of Qurbaton Ke Silsilay, a drama broadcast on PTV.

== Filmography ==
=== Films ===
Year	Title	Role	Notes
2015	Good Morning Karachi	PJ	cameo
2015	Manto	Taangay Wali	

=== Television ===
Year	Title	Role	Notes
1989	Kiran	Kiran	
1995	Dastak Aur Darwaza	Rabia Ali	
1995	Uraan	Fayeza	
1996	Janjal Pura	Mah Jabeen	
1998	Madan-e-Mohabbat	Jameela	Aik Mohabbat Sau Afsanay
2000	Mohabatain	Sara	
2000	Inkaar	Tania	
2001	Muskarahat	Atia	
2001	Sawan	Naureen	
2001	Pehli Barish	Megha	
2003	Karwat	Rabeya	
2004	Qafla	Savera	
2004	Mahnoor	Kajal Bai	Telefilm
2005	Tanha	Rania	
2005	Shikast	Nisha	
2006	Gharoor	Baawi	
2006	Manzil	Somia	
2006	Ek Tere Siwa	Shaista	
2007	Aurat Aur Char Devari	Shehnaz / Zubeida	Episode "Aik Aurat Do Nikkah"
2008	Kaisa Yeh Junoon	Rukhsana	
	Pul Saraat		Telefilm
	Baji		Telefilm
	Arzoo		Telefilm
2010	Diya Jalay	Nadia	
2010–11	Qaid-e-Tanhai	Aisha	
2010–11	Mera Saaein	Naima Malik	
2010–11	Woh Chaar		
2012	Mera Yaqeen	Maha	
2012–13	Badi Aapa	Zubeida “Bari Aapa”	
2013	Teri Berukhi	Aleena	
2017	Manto	Taangay Wali	
2017	Kitni Girhain Baaki Hain (season 2)	Meena	Episode 33
2017	Laut Ke Chalay Aana	Zainab	
2017–18	Meraas	Jahan Aara	
2018	Nibah	Saiqa	
2018–19	Baba Jani	Sadia	
2018–19	Haiwan	Azra	
2019–20	Meray Paas Tum Ho	Maham Sayyed	Guest appearance
2019–20	Tera Yahan Koi Nahin	Hawa	
2020	Tum Ho Wajah	Sehba	
2020	Dikhawa		Anthology series; Episode 2
2022–2023	Wehem	Rukhsana Saleem	
2023	Mein Kahani Hun		
2023	Kitni Girhain Baaki Hain	Zahida Ali	Episode "Husn-e-Ittefaq"
2023–24	Jaan-e-Jahan	Kishwar Shah	
2024	Bismil	Reham	
2024	Parwarish	Mahnoor Jahangir	
2025	Kuch Na Kehna	Noora	

=== Web series ===
Year	Title	Role	Platform	Notes
2021	Dhoop Ki Deewar	Amna Sher Ali	ZEE5	
2024	Abdullahpur Ka Devdas	Jahan Aara Begum	ZEE5	

=== Talk Shows ===
Nadeem was the presenter of AAJ TV's morning show AAJ SUBH from 27 September 2010 to 16 September 2011.

== Awards ==
Year	Award	Category	Work	Result	Ref.
TBA	PTV Awards	Best Drama Actress	Inkaar	Won	

=== Lux Style Awards ===
Ceremony	Category	Project	Result
3rd Lux Style Awards	Best Television Actress	Ibn Aadam	Nominated
7th Lux Style Awards	Best Television Actress (Satellite)	Shikwah	Nominated
8th Lux Style Awards	Best Television Actress (Satellite)	Milay Kuch Yun	Nominated
10th Lux Style Awards	Best Television Actress (Satellite)	Diya Jalay	Nominated
11th Lux Style Awards	Best Television Actress (Satellite)	Qaid-e-Tanhai	Won

== See also ==
- List of Lollywood actors
