= Fishaar =

Pakistani television series

- فشار
- Genre: Drama
- Written by: Amjad Islam Amjad
- Directed by: Ayub Khawar
- Starring: Qavi Khan; Samina Peerzada; Sohail Ahmed; Waseem Abbas; Tauqeer Nasir; Nauman Ijaz
- Country of origin: Pakistan
- Original language: Urdu
- No. of episodes: 24

Original release
- Network: PTV
- Release: 1990 – 1990

Fishaar (Urdu: فشار; transl. Pressure) is a Pakistani Urdu-language television drama serial written by Amjad Islam Amjad and directed by Ayub Khawar. The 24-episode serial was produced at the Lahore Centre of Pakistan Television Corporation and first broadcast in 1990.

The serial dealt with social pressures faced by young people in urban Pakistan, including unemployment and limited educational opportunities. It is among the early-career roles of Nauman Ijaz, whose previous appearance was a debut and brief role in the 1989 PTV play Aik Din, as well as of Sohail Ahmed, Natasha Hussain and Tauqeer Nasir.

== Plot ==
The serial follows a group of young people navigating financial hardship, joblessness and the pressures of family expectation in a Pakistani urban setting, with several storylines exploring the temptations and difficulties of choosing legitimate paths to advancement.

== Cast ==
- Qavi Khan as Seth Razzaq
- Samina Peerzada as Razia
- Sohail Ahmed as Malik
- Waseem Abbas as Fareed
- Mehboob Alam as Toheed
- Tahira Wasti as Bilqees Anees
- Tauqeer Nasir as Waleed
- Abid Kashmiri as Nawaz Din Chaudhary
- Nauman Ijaz as Ahmad Jamal Khan
- Mehmood Aslam as Ashfaq
- Aurangzeb Leghari as Murtaza Khan
- Khursheed Shahid as Shamsa
- Arifa Siddiqui as Rabab
- Naima Khan as Lalarukh
- Khalid Butt as Zaid
- Natasha Hussain as Natasha
