= Sona Chandi =

Pakistani television series

- Written by: Munnu Bhai
- Directed by: Rashid Dar
- Starring: Sheeba Hassan; Hamid Rana; Ghayyur Akhtar; Tamanna Begum; Tashqeen; Munir Zareef; Atiya Sharaf; Yaqoob Atif; Khursheed Shahid; Neelofar Abbasi; Yasmeen Tahir; Farooq Zameer; Tauqeer Nasir; Arifa Siddiqui; Jamil Fakhri; Masood Akhtar; Durdana Butt; Shakila Qureshi; Abid Kashmiri; Samina Khalid; Tani Begum; Talat Siddiqui; Najma Mehboob
- Country of origin: Pakistan
- Original language: Urdu
- No. of episodes: 48

Production
- Producer: Pakistan Television Corporation
- Running time: 20-25 Min

Original release
- Release: 1982

Sona Chandi (Urdu: سونا چاندی) is a classic Pakistani comedy-drama television serial that produced 48 episodes but released only 32 episodes by PTV . The story of the drama, written by Munnu Bhai, revolves around a couple who comes to a city in search of work so that they can pay off their debt. The role of Sona is played by Hamid Rana and Chandi by Sheeba Hassan. This simple, innocent couple, while performing their domestic-help jobs in different homes, ends up helping many people solve their problems.

== Play's background and inspiration ==
The play was inspired by a real couple named Sona (male) and Chandi (female) from Kallurkot, a Tehsil city in the Bhakkar District of Punjab, Pakistan. Munnu Bhai (the writer of the play), who was educated in Kallurkot during his father's posting there as the railway station master of North Western Railway (British India) in the city before 1947, has mentioned his inspiration for these roles in his numerous interviews. Sona is still alive and lives in Kallurkot. During one of his visits to Kallurkot a few years back, Munnu Bhai got to meet the real Sona, who is portrayed in the 1983 film version of the same play, 'Sona Chandi' (1983).

The credit for its popularity goes to the whole team: Munnu Bhai's script, direction by Rashid Dar, and performances by the actors, especially the leading characters of this PTV drama. Sona and Chandi.

== Cast ==
=== Main cast ===
- Sheeba Hassan as Chandi
- Hamid Rana as Sona
- Ghayyur Akhtar as Bhai Hameed
- Ayub Khan as Mama Yaqoob
- Tashfeen as Baji Rukhsana
- Munir Zareef as Chacha karmoo
- Atiya Sharaf as Massi Barkate
- Munna Lahori as Diver of Nawab Farasat Ali Khan

=== Supporting cast ===
- Khursheed Shahid as Mehtab Begum
- Asim Bukhari as Shams
- Farooq Zameer as Abbas Ali Khan
- Durdana Butt as Kako Dhoban
- Arifa Siddiqui as Chhoti Bibi
- Tauqeer Nasir as Popa
- Neelofar Abbasi as Begum Akhtar
- Aurangzeb Leghari as Bao Naseeb
- Tamanna Begum as Ruqaya
- Jamil Fakhri as Munawar
- Abid Kashmiri as Ghafoor
- Sajjad Kishwar as Tafazzul
- Yasmeen Tahir as Mrs. Tafazzul
- Samina Khalid as Batool
- Tani Begum as Basheera
- Talat Siddiqui as Begum Abbas Ali
- Shakila Qureshi as Pinky
- Masood Akhtar as Chaudhry Afzal
- Najma Mehboob as Frasat Ali Khan's mother
- Reena as Zaib
- Ismat Tahira as Hameeda
- Muhammad Sharif as Basheer
