= Ajoka Theatre =

Pakistani not-for-profit arts organization

- Type: Not-for-profit arts organization
- Industry: Entertainment
- Genre: Urdu and Punjabi plays, social performance, street theatre & theatre for peace
- Founded: 14 May 1984; 42 years ago
- Founder: Madeeha Gauhar
- Headquarters: Lahore, Punjab, Pakistan
- Area served: Worldwide
- Key people: Madeeha Gauahar; Shahid Nadeem; Nirvaan Nadeem
- Website: ajoka.org.pk

Ajoka Theatre (Urdu: اجوکا ناٹک, literal translation of Ajoka: "today/present") is a Pakistani not-for-profit arts organization based in Lahore, Punjab, with focus on producing and performing social theatrical stage productions, founded in 1984. The group was formed by director, actress and playwright, Madeeha Gauhar at peak of the tensions during the state of emergency under the regime of General Muhammad Zia-ul-Haq. Ajoka Theatre received the prestigious Prince Claus Award in 2006 and the International Theatre Pasta Award in 2007.

Since its inception, the group have staged many popular society critical pieces in theatres, on the streets and in public spaces, as well as in productions for television and on video. Ajoka Theatre has not only performed in Pakistan, but has also in the South Asian region, in countries like India, Bangladesh, Nepal and Sri Lanka, as well as in Europe and United States of America. The group focuses on promotion of a just, humane, secular and equal society, alongside the subject of women's rights in a society that is greatly dominated by men.

The group's first ever theatrical performance was Jaloos (Procession) written by veteran Indian playwright Badal Sarkar. The style of Ajoka's performances can be characterised as an elaboration on the oral tradition of Bhand and Nautanki that found a flourishing base in the area that currently overlaps the province of Punjab. In spite of the Western education of Gauhar, she does not limit herself to classical Western theatre techniques. Instead, she mixes authentic Pakistani elements, combining it with contemporary sentiments.

== History ==
Gauhar was born in 1956 in Karachi. After she obtained a Master of Arts degree in English literature, she moved to England where she obtained another master's degree, in theatre sciences at the University of London. In 1983, after returning to Lahore, Gauhar and her husband Shahid Nadeem founded Ajoka Theatre, the first theatre group of significance there.

In 2007, Ajoka performed a piece that was written and directed by Gauhar, called Burqavaganza (Burqa-vaganza), which led to great controversy. Actors dressed in burkas put themes on the stage like sexual discrimination, intolerance and fanaticism. From a Western perspective, the piece was a rather innocent performance on hypocrisy of a society that bathes in corruption. In her own country though, Members of Parliament called for a ban of it, and the Minister of Culture threatened with sanctions when it would be staged any longer. In spite of the ban, non-governmental organisations and women's rights activists had the theatre piece translated into English and staged performances internationally as a sign of support to Ajoka.

On 23 August 2008, Alhamra Arts Council hosted the launch of Selected Plays published by Oxford University Press (OUP) and written by Shahid Nadeem with the help of Ajoka. The book contains seven of his famous plays Teesri Dastak, Barri, Aik Thi Nani, Kala Meda Bhes, Dukhini, Bulha and Burqavaganza. The book again launched at the Pakistan National Council of the Arts (PNCA), Islamabad on 25 August 2008 with the help of Pakistan Academy of Letters. His book, Selected Plays, a collection of his six famous plays in an English translation was published by OUP in August 2008. Two collections of his Urdu and Punjabi plays has been published.

In 2012, Nadeem wrote a play Kaun Hai Yeh Gustakh, directed by Madeeha Gauhar and first played at Alhamra Arts Council, Lahore on 14 December by Ajoka. The play is based on the life of Saadat Hassan Manto, and was well received by audiences. Manto was played by Naseem Abbas. In January 2013 the play was presented at the Akshara Theatre in New Delhi, India. The play was due to be presented at the National School of Drama (NSD) in New Delhi but was cancelled due to security concerns. In February 2013, the play was held at Nishtar Hall, Peshawar by Ajoka.

== Productions ==
Ajoka Theatre has staged several theatrical performances, mostly all plays have been adapted or written by Madeeha Gauhar and Shahid Nadeem.

- 1984: Jaloos, by Badal Sarkar
- 1985: Chalk Chakkar, by Bertolt Brecht
- 1987: Barri, by Shahid Nadeem
- 1987: Marya Hoya Kutta, by Shahid Nadeem
- 1988: Itt, by Shahid Nadeem
- 1989: Choolah, by Shahid Nadeem
- 1990: Jhali Kithay Jaway, by Shahid Nadeem
- 1991: Teesri Dastak, by Shahid Nadeem
- 1992: Lappar, by Shahid Nadeem
- 1992: Toba Tek Singh, by Saadat Hassan Manto
- 1992: Dekh Tamasha Chaltha Ban, by Shahid Nadeem
- 1993: Aik Thee Naani, by Shahid Nadeem
- 1994: Kali Ghata: Acting for Nature by WWF Pakistan
- 1994: Talismati Tota, by Shahid Nadeem
- 1995: Jum Jum Jeevay Jaman Pura, by Shahid Nadeem
- 1996: Kala Mainda Bhes, by Madeeha Gauhar
- 1997: Dukhini, by Shahid Nadeem
- 1998: Bala King, by Bertolt Brecht
- 2000: Adhoori, by Kishwar Naheed, Fehmida Riaz and Ishrat Afreen
- 2001: Chal Melay Nu Chaliay, by Shahid Nadeem
- 2001: Bullah, by Shahid Nadeem
- 2004: Mainoon Kari Kareenday Ni Mae, by Shahid Nadeem
- 2004: Piro Preman, by Dr. Swarajbir
- 2004: Shehr-e-Afsos, by Intezar Hussain
- 2005: Border, Border, by Shahid Nadeem
- 2006: Dukh Darya, by Shahid Nadeem
- 2006: Dushman, by Shahid Nadeem
- 2006: Maon Kay Naam, by Saadat Hasan Manto
- 2007: Surkh Gulaaba'n Da Mausam, by Mazhar Tirmazi
- 2007: Burqavaganza, by Shahid Nadeem
- 2008: Hotel Mohenjodaro, by Ghulam Abbas
- 2009: Raja Rasalu, by Malik Aslam
- 2010: Dara, by Shahid Nadeem
- 2011: The Dreams Can Come True, by Shahid Nadeem
- 2011: Mera Rang De Basanti Chola, by Madeeha Gauhar
- 2011: Amrika Chalo, by Shahid Nadeem
- 2012: Rozan-E-Zindan Se, by Shahid Nadeem
- 2012: Kaun Hai Yeh Gustakh, by Shahid Nadeem
- 2014: Lo Phir Basant Ayee, by Shahid Nadeem
- 2015: Kaun Bane Ga Badshah, by Shahid Nadeem
- 2016: Kabeera Khara Bazar Mai, by Shahid Nadeem
- 2016: Anhi Mai Da Sufna, by Shahid Nadeem
- 2017: Intezaar, by Shahid Nadeem
- 2018: Chairing Cross, by Shahid Nadeem

== Bibliography ==
=== Literature ===
- Afzal-Khan, Fawzia (2005). A Critical Stage: The Role of Secular Alternative Theatre in Pakistan. India: Seagull Books. ISBN 9788170462750.
- Nadeem, Shahid (2008). Selected Plays. Pakistan: Oxford University Press. ISBN 9780195474770.
