= Abid Kashmiri =

Pakistani actor and comedian (1950–2024)

- عابد کاشمیری
- Born: 4 May 1947; Lahore, Punjab, Pakistan
- Died: 11 October 2024 (aged 77); Lahore, Punjab, Pakistan
- Occupation: Actor
- Years active: 1965–2024

Abid Kashmiri (Urdu: عابد کاشمیری; 4 May 1947 – 11 October 2024) was a Pakistani film, television and stage actor, known for his comedic roles. He worked in Pakistani films, TV dramas as well as theatre in both Urdu and Punjabi languages.

== Early life and career ==
Kashmiri was born on 4 May 1947 in Lahore, Punjab. He was married and had two sons and two daughters.

He started his acting career in the mid-1970s and became established as a comedian from the early 1980s.

== Death ==
Kashmiri died in Lahore on 11 October 2024, following a heart attack. He was 77.

== Selected filmography ==
=== Films ===
Year	Title
1982	Aahat
1988	Bazar-e-Husn
1996	Jeety Hain Shaan Se

=== Television series ===
Year	Title	Role	Network
1975	Mai Aur Kamai	Sultan	PTV
1979	Waris	Hasmat's man	PTV
1980	Teesra Kinara	Bank manager	PTV
1981	Dehleez	Salmat	PTV
1982	Sona Chandi	Ghafoor	PTV
1982	Alif Noon	Jasoos	PTV
1983	Samundar	Gullu Badshah	PTV
1984	Mata-e-Gharoor	Shop keeper	PTV
1984	Dukhon Ki Chadar	Chaudhry Niaz	PTV
1984	Andhera Ujala	Saeed	PTV
1985	Dasht-e-Tanhai	Parvez	PTV
1985	Apnay Log	Imran	PTV
1986	Lekin	Baqir	PTV
1986	Khawabon Ka Jungle	Fareed	PTV
1986	Sacha Jhoot	Butt Sahab	PTV
1987	Raat	Mehtab	PTV
1988	Suraj Key Sath Sath	Siraj	PTV
1990	Fishar	Nawazuddin Chaudhry	PTV
1993	Zakham	Abdul Ghafoor	PTV
1998	Home Sweet Home	Siddiqui	PTV
2007	Lahori Gate	Pehlwan	PTV

== Awards ==
- 1988 - Nigar Award for Best Comedian - Bazar-e-Husn
