= Neelay Hath =

Pakistani television drama series

- نیلے ہاتھ
- Genre: Drama
- Written by: Shahid Nadeem
- Directed by: Muhammad Azeem
- Starring: Madeeha Gauhar; Uzma Gillani; Arifa Siddiqui; Bindiya; Faryal Gohar; Saba Hameed; Bushra Ansari; Roohi Bano
- Country of origin: Pakistan
- Original language: Urdu
- No. of seasons: 1
- No. of episodes: 19

Production
- Producer: Muhammad Azeem

Original release
- Network: PTV
- Release: 1989 – 1989

Neelay Hath (Urdu: نیلے ہاتھ, lit. 'Blue Hands') is a 1989 Pakistani television drama series written by Shahid Nadeem and directed and produced by Muhammad Azeem. It was adapted from the stage play Barri (The Acquittal), written by Nadeem and first produced by Ajoka Theatre in 1987, directed by Madeeha Gauhar. The series aired on PTV during the first government of Benazir Bhutto. It was also broadcast in India.

== Plot ==
Nabeela Noman, an educated woman and member of a women's rights organisation, is imprisoned on false charges. In prison, she encounters four other women who have also been falsely imprisoned: an activist, a mother detained in place of her wanted son, a woman charged with dancing at a shrine, and a young woman who killed her husband.

== Cast ==
- Madeeha Gauhar as Nabeela Noman
- Uzma Gillani as Zulekha
- Saba Hameed as Parveen
- Roohi Bano as Zainab
- Bushra Ansari as Jameela
- Arifa Siddiqui as Sakeena
- Bindiya as Sajida Hameed
- Faryal Gohar as Zarmeen
- Khayyam Sarhadi as Rashid
- Talat Siddiqui as Sakeena's mother
- Mehboob Alam as Jeevan
- Irsa Ghazal as Rano
- Naima Khan as Bari Phuppo
- Nirvaan Nadeem as Jameela's son
- Asim Bukhari as Noman Siddiqui
- Fareeha Jabeen as Police Woman
- Hina Shaheen as Wakeel
- Tani Begum as Rani
- Mehmood Aslam as Manzoor
- Jazba Sultan as Ruqayya
- Mansoor Baloch as Kamran
- Jameel Fakhri as Khanu
- Haseeb Pasha as Jilani
- Uzra Butt as Mai Jee
- Kanwal Nauman as Amna
- Ismat Tahira as Sudhi
- Tauqeer Nisar as Murad
- Tasneem Kausar as Nazeer Bibi
- Najma Begum as Clothing Supervisor in Jail
- Altaf ur Rehman as Parveen's father
- Khalida Arjumand as Sajida's mother
- Aurangzeb Leghari as Abdul Kareem
- Yusaf Ali as Rehmat
- Jeevan Sultan as Deputy
- Sikandar Shaheen as I.G.
- Khalid Butt as Muhammad Deen
- Mehwish Apa as Prisoner
- Roohi Khan as Zeenat Ara
- Basit Khan as Rizwan
- Parvez Raza as Mukhtar
- Munir Nadir as Chaudhry Bichoo
- Inam Khan as Anwar
- Hamid Mehmood as Lal Deen
- Reena as Zarmin
- Noman Shah as Adil
- Salma Khan as Shehzadi
- Tahira Saleem as Mrs Tauqeer
- Veena Khan as Hajra

== Production ==
Neelay Hath was adapted from Barri (The Acquittal), a stage play written by Shahid Nadeem and first produced by Ajoka Theatre in 1987 under the direction of Madeeha Gauhar. The play portrays four women held in a prison cell on different charges and was produced to draw attention to the conditions of women prisoners and gender discrimination in Pakistan's legal system. Following the play's critical success in Pakistan and India, Nadeem adapted it as a television serial. The play has subsequently been staged in various cities in Pakistan, India, and the United States.
