= Mehmood Aslam =

Pakistani actor

- محمود اسلم
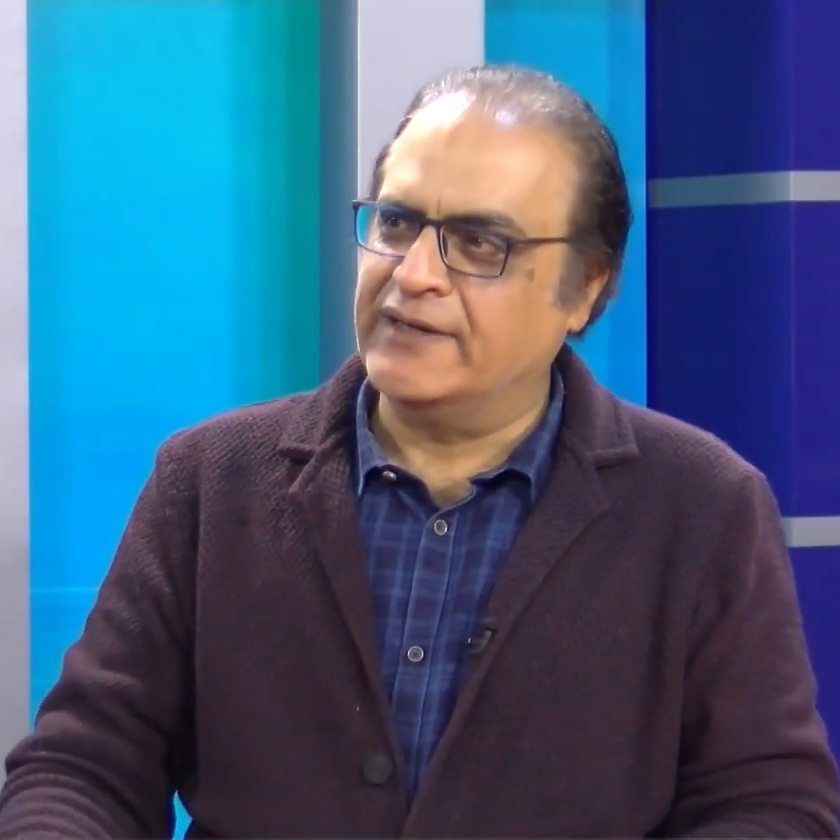
- Aslam in 2020
- Born: 1 December 1951 (age 74); Lahore, Punjab, Pakistan
- Occupations: Actor; Director
- Years active: 1977–present
- Notable work: Janjal Pura, Boota From Toba Tek Singh, Bulbulay, London Criminology

Mehmood Aslam (Punjabi, Urdu: محمود اسلم) is a Pakistani actor who works mainly in television, and has also done some films and stage dramas. Mostly known for his notable work in Bulbulay.

== Career ==
Active as an actor since 1977, Aslam has appeared in classic drama series such as Andhera Ujala (1984–1985), Din (1992) and Janjal Pura (1996). He has played lead roles as well as supporting roles as villains, but is best known for his comic role in the ongoing comedy series Bulbulay, which began in 2009.

Some of his other notable projects include Landa Bazar (2002), Uraan (2010), Ladies Park (2011) and Daray Daray Naina (2012),Amna aur wehshi Darinda(2025).

== Filmography ==
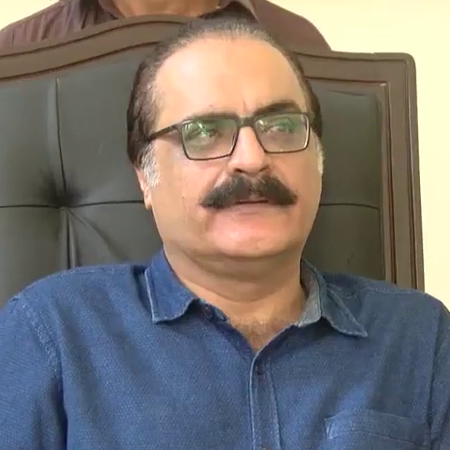
Aslam in 2018

=== Films ===
Key
†	Denotes films that have not yet been released
†	Denotes films that are currently on cinema

Year	Film	Role	Language
1990	Sarmaya	Out	Punjabi
1990	Jurrat	Mastu	Punjabi
2013	Strawberry		Urdu
2018	Teefa in Trouble	Butt Sahab	Urdu/Punjabi
2018	Jackpot		Urdu
2019	Wrong No. 2	Wazir	Urdu
2019	Chhalawa	Chaudhary Rafaqat	Urdu
2019	Kaaf Kangana		Urdu
2022	Chakkar		Urdu
2022	Quaid-e-Azam Zindabad	Babar Jilani	Urdu
2023	Huey Tum Ajnabi	Sheikh Mujibur Rahman	Urdu

=== Television series ===
Year	Title	Role	Channel
1983	Samundar	Najeeb	PTV
1983	Ragon Main Andhera	Anwar	PTV
1983	Phoolon Wala Raasta	Naveed	PTV
1983	Roshni	Rasheed	PTV
1983	Picnic	Amir's cousin	PTV
1984	Andhera Ujala	Different roles.	PTV
1984	Dukhon Ki Chadar	S.P	PTV
1985	Khawaja and Son	Waqar	PTV
1985	Apnay Log	Mudassir	PTV
1985	Waqt	Sultan	PTV
1987	Dhund Ke Us Paar	Sohail	PTV
1987	Raat	Ali Mumtaz	PTV
1989	Pyas	Munshi Hayat	PTV
1989	Neelay Hath	Manzoor	PTV
1990	Fishaar	Ashfaq	PTV
1991	Dard Vichora	Yousaf	PTV
1992	Din	Saeen Dilawar	PTV
1992	Nashaib	Haider	PTV
1994	Paharon Ki Burf	Shehriyar	PTV
1994	Aashob	Raza	PTV
1995	Amar Bail	Nawaz	PTV
1995	Dastak Aur Darwaza	Hameed	PTV
1995	Uraan	Khanzada	PTV
1996	Janjal Pura	Reema	PTV
1997	Mein Ik Darya Ke Paar Utra	Moin	PTV
1998	Yeh Azad Log	Master Majeed	PTV
1999	Comedy Theater	Different roles.	PTV
1999	Boota from Toba Tek Singh	Kanwar Surkhab	PTV
2000	Dopatta	Tauseeq Alam	PTV
2000	Mohabatein	Shahnawaz	PTV
2001	Kaun	Doctor	STN
2001	Mr Jamshaid D.P	Mr Jamshaid D.P	STN
2002	Landa Bazar	Dawar Kamal	PTV
2003	Achanak	Treen	PTV
2003	Umrao Jaan Ada	Dilawar Khan	Geo Entertainment
2003	Babay	Ahmed Jamal	PTV
2004	Ajjal	Jawwad	PTV
2004	Kantay	Mumtaz Khan Taji	PTV
2005	Double Sawari		PTV
2006	Malangi	Malik	PTV
2007	Abhi Abhi To Aye Ho		PTV
2009	Ishq Ki Inteha	Qayyum	Geo Entertainment
2009–present	Bulbulay	Mahmood Sahab	ARY Digital
2010	Uraan		Geo TV
2011	Ladies Park		Geo TV
2011	Shikan		PTV Home
2012	Band Baje Ga	Jahangeer (Jojo)	ARY Digital
2012	Vanee		Geo TV
2012	Daray Daray Naina		A-Plus TV
2014	Main Deewani		Hum TV
2014	Haq Maher		ARY Digital
2014	Jalebiyan	Tafangam	Geo TV
2014	Sadqay Tumhare		Hum TV
2015	Alvida	Salman	Hum TV
2016	Mann Mayal	Shahaab	Hum TV
2016	Lagao	Rana	Hum TV
2017	Mohabbat Khawab Safar	Agha Fayyaz	Hum TV
2017	Hari Hari Churiyaan	Shujat	Geo TV
2017	Pagli	Hakeem Karamat Ali	Hum TV
2017	Khaani	Mir Shah	Geo Entertainment
2018	Haara Dil	Abrar	A-Plus TV
2018	Ki Jaana Main Kaun	Waqar Ahmad Khan	Hum TV
2018	Silsilay	Ateeque	Geo Entertainment
2019	Yaariyan	Hamid Baig	Geo Entertainment
2019	Do Bol	Iqbal Hussain	ARY Digital
2019	Meray Dost Meray Yaar	Uncle Sam	Geo TV
2019	Deewangi	Mujadood Durrani	Geo TV
2020	Shokhiyaan	Sikander	Geo TV
2020	Raqs e Bismil	Pir Qudaratullah Shah	Hum TV
2021	Ishq Jalebi	Rafaqat	Geo Entertainment
2021	Baddua	Mudassir	ARY Digital
2022	Fraud	Nisar	ARY Digital
2022	Farq	Arif	Geo Entertainment
2022	Badzaat	Akbar	Geo Entertainment
2022	Tere Bin	Malik Mukhtar	Geo Entertainment
2023	Ehraam-e-Junoon	Kamran	Geo Entertainment
2024	Jaan Nisar	Baba Saien	Geo Entertainment
2024	Aye Ishq e Junoon	Ali Nawaz	ARY Digital
2024	Faraar	Azam Shah	Green Entertainment
2025	Main Zameen Tu Aasmaan	Sultan Ahmed	Green Entertainment
2026	Shaidai	Malik Hashmat	Geo Entertainment
2026	Nashtar	Mansab Ali Khan	Geo Entertainment
2026	Mitti De Baway	Azam Khan	Green Entertainment
2026	Dar-e-Nijaat	Qudratullah	ARY Digital

=== Telefilms ===
Year	Title	Role	Channel	Notes
2010	Shadi Aur Tum Say?	Seemi Pasha	Hum TV	
2015	Main Mari Nahin Mirza		Ary Digital	Eid special
2017	Principal Nadra 19 Grade		Hum TV	Eid special
2018	Rok Sako To Rok Lo	Chaudhry Sahab	Geo TV	
2019	Help Me Durdana	Chaudhry Sahab	Ary Digital	Eid special
2022	Saeedabad ki Saeeda	Mirza Liaquat	Hum TV	Eid special

=== Anthology series ===
Year	Title	Role	Channel	Notes
2018	Kabhi Band Kabhi Baja		Express Entertainment	Episode 12
2018	Ustani Jee	Abdul Karim	Hum TV	Episode 7
2019	Choti Choti Batain		Hum TV	Story 6
2023	Dikhawa (season 4)		Geo Entertainment	Episode "Qanoon"
2024	Contractors		Geo Entertainment	Supporting role

=== Other appearances ===
Year	Title	Notes
2017	Mazaaq Raat	Special appearance
2019	Bol Nights with Ahsan Khan	Special appearance

== Awards and nominations ==
Year	Ceremony	Category	Project	Result
2008	7th Lux Style Awards	Best TV Actor (Satellite)	Hazaron Khwahishen	Nominated
2012	11th Lux Style Awards	Best TV Actor (Terrestrial)	Aankh Salamat Andhe Log	Nominated
2014	2nd Hum Awards	Best Supporting Actor	Rishtay Kuchh Adhooray Se	Nominated
