= Munir Nadir =

Pakistani actor (1946–2016)

- منِیر نادر
- Born: 1946; Lahore, Punjab, British India
- Died: 26 August 2016 (aged 69–70); Lahore, Punjab, Pakistan
- Occupations: TV actor; film actor; radio artist
- Years active: 1970–2016

Munir Nadir (1946 — 2016) was a notable Pakistani film actor. He also worked in television and theatre. He died at the age of 70 in Lahore.

== Filmography ==
=== Television ===
Year	Drama	Role	Network	Notes
1980	Teesra Kinara	Sultan	PTV	
1981	Dehleez	Malik	PTV	
1981	Mata-e-Ghuroor	Sultan	PTV	Long-play
1983	Ragon Mein Andhera	Mushtaq Katta	PTV	Long-play
1984	Andhera Ujala	Different roles.	PTV	Anthology series
1985	Apnay Log	Pehlwan's man	PTV	Long-play
1988	Sooraj Ke Sath Sath	Chaudhry	PTV	
1989	Neelay Hath	Chaudhry Bichoo	PTV	
1989	Pyas	Policeman	PTV	
1992	Mitti Sona	Waryam	PTV	Anthology: Ajj Di Kahani
1994	Manchalay Ka Sauda	Guest	PTV	Episode: 12
1996	Janjal Pura	Iman Bakhsh	PTV	
2002	Hum Tum Aur Woh	Pehlwan Hadi Jor	PTV	
2002	Landa Bazar	Master Jee	PTV	
2008	Wavrola	Allah Wasaaya	PTV	
2011	Zindagi	Nazeer	PTV	
2015	Aangan Mein Deewar	Mehmood Aalam	PTV	
2016	Akeli Reh Gai Mein	Shaikh Ji	PTV	
