= Aurangzeb Leghari =

Pakistani actor (born 1944)

- اورنگزیب لغاری
- Born: 25 October 1944 (age 82); Rahimabad, Rahim Yar Khan, British India
- Education: Central Model School Lahore, Government College Lahore, Cadet College Petaro, Jamshoro
- Occupations: Actor; Weather presenter
- Years active: 1960–present
- Awards: Pride of Performance Award (2014)

Aurangzeb Leghari (born 25 October 1944) is a Pakistani TV actor who has been working in TV dramas since the 1970s. His notable TV dramas include Waris, Dehleez, Waqat, Uchay Burj Lahore Dey, and Chanan Tey Dariya. He was honored with the Pride of Performance Award in 2014.

== Early life ==
Leghari was born on 25 October 1944 in Rahimabad, Rahim Yar Khan, British India. He completed his education at the Government Central Model School, Lahore. He earned his graduate degree at the Government College Lahore.

== Career ==
Leghari started his acting career by participating in theatrical plays in the 1960s. His debut TV play was Samjohta, but he got fame for his role in Amjad Islam Amjad's play Waris, telecast in 1979–1980 on PTV. He has performed in some 300 theatrical plays.

He worked in over 300 theatrical plays and he also hosted shows. Then he worked as Weather presenter used to read the weather report on PTV.

He also appeared in some Urdu films like Naureen, Faslay (1981), and others.

== Personal life ==
Aurangzeb has been married twice, but he is now living a blissful life with his first wife and family. He has four children—two with each wife. He recently stated in an interview that his second marriage lasted for an unpleasant 14 years. However, after a long separation, his second wife finally agreed to divorce.

Since 2024, he has been managing a business alongside his acting career.

== Selected filmography ==
=== Television ===
| Year | Title | Role | Network | Notes |
|---|---|---|---|---|
| 1973 | Aik Mohabbat So Afsanay | Master Ji | PTV | |
| 1979 | Alif Laila | Bandar Jin | PTV | Bandar Ki Kahani |
| 1979 | Waris | Chaudhry Niaz Ali | PTV | |
| 1980 | Chanan Tey Dariya | Amir | PTV | Punjabi drama |
| 1981 | Dehleez | Jahangir | PTV | |
| 1982 | Sona Chandi | Naseeb | PTV | |
| 1984 | Andhera Ujala | Raheel | PTV | |
| 1984 | Mirza And Sons | Abid | PTV | Long-play |
| 1985 | Sahil | Sajjad | PTV | |
| 1985 | Apnay Log | Musharraf | PTV | Long-play |
| 1986 | Waqat | Zaid | PTV | |
| 1986 | Hazaron Raaste | Taimoor | PTV | |
| 1989 | Neelay Hath | Abdul Kareem | PTV | |
| 1990 | Uchay Burj Lahore Dey | Parvaiz | PTV | Punjabi drama |
| 1990 | Chakar-e-Azam | Gohram Khan | PTV | |
| 1990 | Fishaar | Murtaza Khan | PTV | |
| 1991 | Tahli Thallay | Saeed | PTV | Punjabi drama |
| 1993 | Fareb | Sultan Khan | PTV | |
| 1995 | Zard Dopehar | Officer | PTV | |
| 1996 | Paigham Zubani Aur Hai | Muhammad Ali | PTV | Hairat Kadah |
| 1997 | Ghar Se Ghar | Sheikh Zubruddin | PTV | |
| 1998 | Ghulam Gardish | Riyasat Ali | PTV | |
| 1999 | Kikar Kanday | Riyasat | PTV | Punjabi drama |
| 2002 | Thori Khushi Thora Ghum | Allah Wasaya | PTV | |
| 2003 | Dil Lagi | Mehmood | PTV | |
| 2005 | Azal | Rahim | Indus TV | |
| 2008 | Oops | Hassan | ARY Digital | |
| 2010 | Awaaz | Sheikh Sahab | ATV | |
| 2011 | Adhooray Khawab | Jamal | PTV Home | |
| 2011 | Al Tash | Javed | PTV Home | |
| 2012 | Main | Chaudhry Sahab | PTV Home | |
| 2013 | Mere Harjai | Saad's father | ARY Digital | |
| 2014 | Khechal | Chaudhary Akbar | PTV Home | Punjabi drama |
| 2014–2015 | Ye Chahatain Ye Ranjishain | Sikandar | PTV Home | |
| 2015 | Mazi | Farooq | A-Plus TV | |
| 2016 | Piya Be Dardi | Sahir's father | A-Plus TV | |
| 2017 | Namak | Seth Jawad | PTV Home | |
| 2017 | Rani | Qutub Shah | Geo Entertainment | |
| 2018 | Tu Jo Nahi | Chaudhary Sahib | Express Entertainment | |
| 2019 | Kaneez | | A-Plus TV | |
| 2018–19 | Be Parwaiyaan | | PTV Home | |
| 2020 | Dil Tanha Tanha | Mirha's father | Hum TV | |
| 2020 | Saraab | Hoorain's father | Hum TV | |
| 2021 | Ajnabi Humsafar | Aleezay's father | SAB TV | |
| 2021 | Dobara | Mehru's father | Hum TV | |
| 2023 | Mohabbat Kay Baad | Jia's father | SAB TV | |
| 2023 | Tere Siwa | Arshad | Mun TV | |

=== Films and Short films ===
| Year | Film | Language |
|---|---|---|
| 1970 | Noreen | Urdu |
| 1978 | Saheli | Urdu |
| 1981 | Faslay | Urdu |
| 1981 | Wafa | Urdu |
| 1982 | Ek Din Bahu Ka | Urdu |
| 1992 | Dillagi | Punjabi |
| 1992 | Shehzada | Urdu |
| 1993 | Qasam | Urdu |
| 1995 | Dharkan | Urdu |
| 2013 | Main Hoon Shahid Afridi | Urdu |
| 2023 | Baba Jani | Urdu |
| 2024 | 200,000 | Urdu |

== Awards and recognition ==
| Year | Award | Category | Title | Result | Ref. |
|---|---|---|---|---|---|
| 1993 | Nigar Awards | Best Supporting Actor | Qasam | Won | |
| 2014 | Pride of Performance | Pride of Performance Award by the President of Pakistan | Arts | Won | |
