= Khursheed Shahid =

Pakistani actress (1926–2021)

- خورشید شاہد
- Born: Khursheed Shahid; 1 January 1923; Delhi, British India
- Died: 27 June 2021 (aged 98); Lahore, Pakistan
- Occupations: Actress; Singer
- Years active: 1933–2010
- Spouse: Salim Shahid (husband)
- Children: Salman Shahid (son)
- Awards: Pride of Performance (1995)

Begum Khursheed Shahid (1 January 1923 – 27 June 2021) was a Pakistani actress and singer. She was also the mother of actor Salman Shahid.

== Early life ==
Khursheed Shahid was born in 1926 in Delhi, where her father was a government official and her mother was an educated housewife. Khursheed, along with her sisters and brother, used to watch performances of Ram Leela, a religious theatre. She, along with her sisters, used to act in Ram Leela Theatre, portraying different characters on stage at age seven. Khursheed completed her education in Delhi. Khursheed's father was a liberal man, who believed that education was important for girls. Khursheed's siblings included four sisters and one brother. Khursheed's father supported her career.

== Career ==
Khursheed Shahid began acting and singing at the age of nine. When Khursheed was in sixth grade, Congress leader Aruna Asaf Ali came to her school looking for someone young, and her classmates told Ms. Ali about her singing and acting talents. Ms. Ali selected Khurhseed for a musical performance. Later, after the performance, Ms. Ali took her to the All India Radio to listen to renowned music composer Feroz Nizami;he listened to her singing and encouraged her to sing. He gave her a poem to sing after listening to Khursheed, so he told her to visit him the next day, so that he would compose it for her. The following day when she sang the poem for Feroz, he liked it and told her that it was of Raag Darbari. Khursheed was nine when she started singing at All India Radio, Delhi. She also read poems written by Mukhtar Siddiqui at All India Radio.

Later, she moved to Parliament Street, where she met music director Roshan Lal Nagrath, paternal grandfather of popular Indian actor Hrithik Roshan. He saw Khursheed's potential for singing, and he started to have rehearsals for her and gave her lessons about singing. Kursheed befriended his wife, and she would visit his family.

After the Partition, in 1947, she and her family moved to Lahore, Pakistan. Khursheed went to Radio Pakistan for audition and she started doing musical programmes by station director Mehmood Nizami. He liked her classical singing and gave her lessons. Mehmood Nizami introduced Khursheed to Bhai Lal, and she learnt classical singing from Bhai Lal Mohammad. She was also inspired by Roshan Ara Begum, she started copying her style and singing so much that many people acknowledged that Khursheed sounded like Roshan Ara on the radio. Khursheed met Roshan Ara Begum at Lahore Arts Council. There Khursheed and Roshan Ara Begum became friends, and she would take Khursheed to places she would visit, and then taught Khursheed to play Tanpura.

Khursheed used to do theatre before the launch of PTV in 1964, and did a lot of quality theatre plays written by Faiz Ahmad Faiz, Manto, and Sadequain. Khursheed made a name for herself in theatre. After PTV was launched in 1964 in Pakistan, the PTV Managing Director Aslam Azhar offered her work. She agreed on the condition that she would be the highest paid actress at PTV, and he agreed. Khursheed did her first play for PTV, Rass Malai, a comedy drama. Then she regularly worked for PTV in dramas including Wadi-e-Purkhar, Kaanch Ka Pul, Fehmida Ki Kahani, Ustani Rahat Ki Zabani, Kiran Kahani and Dhund.

Then Khursheed appeared in Khurshid Anwar's film Chingari at the insistence of Faiz Sahib. Khursheed performance in the Punjabi movie Bhola Sajan, directed by Ashfaque Malik, was regarded as the finest acting; even Khursheed admitted herself.

In 1995, Khursheed was honoured for her contributions towards the singing, film, and television industry, she was honoured by the Government of Pakistan with the Pride of Performance.

Khursheed worked in popular TV drama series to her credit, including Parchaiyan, Zair, Zabar, Pesh, and Uncle Urfi. All these drama series were written by playwright and scriptwriter Haseena Moin. Later in late 2010, she retired and went to live with her son, she moved to Lahore permanently to be with her son Salman Shahid.

== Personal life ==
Kursheed married producer Salim Shahid at a very young age. The marriage did not last long, and they did not divorce. Salim left for BBC London a few years after their marriage; there he stayed till his death. She has one son, Salman Shahid, who is also an actor.

== Illness and death ==
Khursheed Shahid was admitted to a hospital a few days back after she suffered a cardiac arrest. She died on 27 June due to cardiac arrest while she was in the hospital, aged 95 She was laid to rest in a Phase 7 cemetery after her funeral prayers were held at the Defense mosque in Defense Phase 2, Block T.

== Filmography ==
=== Television series ===
- Ras Malai
- Uncle Urfi
- Zair, Zabar, Pesh
- Parchaiyan
- Masoom
- Teesra Kinara
- Samundar
- Sayeen Aur Psychiatrist
- Saahil
- Man Chalay Ka Sauda
- Inn Sey Miliye
- Chabi Aur Chabiyan
- Dhoop Dewar
- Kaanch Ka Pul
- Fehmida Ki Kahani, Ustani Rahat Ki Zubani
- Andhera Ujala
- Sannata
- Sona Chandi
- Chabi Aur Chabiyan
- Ana
- Dhund
- Kiran Kahani
- Fishaar
- Wadi-e-Purkhar
- Boota from Toba Tek Singh
- Ek Umer Asar Hone Tak

=== Telefilm ===
- Haq dar

=== Film ===
- Dhoop Aur Saye
- Chingari
- Bhola Sajan
- Khamosh Pani
- Ghalib

== Awards and recognition ==
She was awarded the Pride of Performance by the President of Pakistan in 1995
