= Zard Dopehar =

Pakistani television melodrama serial

- Title screen for Zard Dopehar
- Genre: Political drama; Telenovela
- Based on: Politics of Pakistan in 90s
- Written by: Shahid Nadeem
- Directed by: Shahid Nadeem
- Starring: Samina Peerzada; Samiya Mumtaz; Madeeha Gauhar; Salman Shahid; Nadira; Naima Khan
- Opening theme: "Zard Dopehar"
- Composer: PTV music
- Country of origin: Pakistan
- Original language: Urdu
- No. of episodes: 13

Production
- Producer: PTV Lahore Center
- Running time: 40 minutes

Original release
- Network: PTV Home
- Release: 1 January 1995 – 1995

Zard Dopehar (Urdu: زرد دوپہر, transl. The yellow afternoon) is a 14-episode Pakistani television melodrama serial, first aired on PTV Home in 1995. It portrayed rise of a middle-class Lahori politician, Malik Mehrban Ali, a character based on Nawaz Sharif.

Samina Peerzada told in an interview that her teenage daughter pulled out a knife after being inspired by the actions of her character in the serial, leading her to make sure to not to allow in her family watching her dramas afterwards.

== History ==
Zard Dopehar was written by Shahid Nadeem. The drama was not given permission to be produced by-then government of the PMLN. The PPP's government allowed the drama to be produced, after winning the elections. It was aired on PTV in 1995.

== Plot ==
Story of the drama revolves around a popular industrialist Mehrban Ali from Walled City of Lahore, who starts his political career as a councilor. But soon with help of flattery of hidden characters and his cleverness, he becomes minister. But then his downfall begins when his political skills starts to become his hurdles. And ringmasters (hidden characters) becomes exasperated of him.

Another story in the drama is of Saira Begum, sister of Mehrban Ali. Her brother doesn't allow her to marry a university fellow, in fear of division of the inherited property. In the drama, women activism can be seen.

== Cast ==
- Enver Sajjad as Mastan
- Madeeha Gauhar as Saira
- Nadira as Laila
- Anmol as Parveen
- Naima Khan as Shahida Nabeel
- Samina Peerzada as Zetoon
- Samiya Mumtaz as Sanyya
- Zahid Qureshi as Akhtar
- Salman Shahid as Nabeel
- Asim Bukhari as Jawad
- Ismat Tahira as Tariq's aunt
- Shujaat Hashmi as Malik Meharban Ali (based on Nawaz Sharif)
- Ghayyur Akhtar as Police officer
- Naseem Abbas as Police officer
- Dildar as Worker
- Altaf ur Rehman as Judge
- Mehar-Un-Nissa as Mehra Begum
- Uzra Butt as Dadi
- Aurangzeb Leghari as Officer
