= Ata ul Haq Qasmi =

Journalist, newspaper columnist

Ata ul Haq Qasmi عطا الحق قاسمی
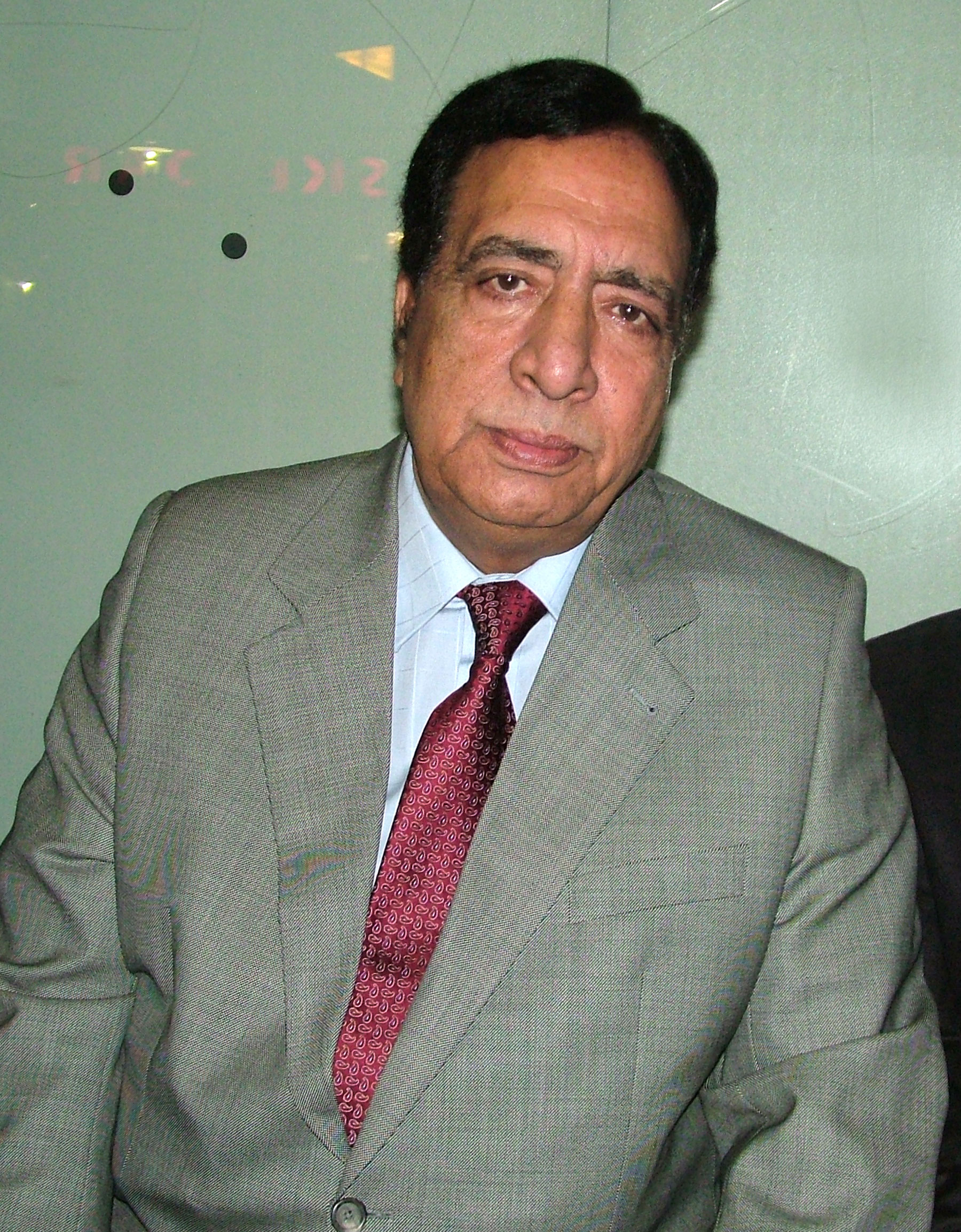
- Born: 1 February 1943 (age 83); Amritsar, Punjab, British India
- Occupations: Columnist, Journalist, Former Ambassador, Former Professor of Urdu Literature
- Known for: Witty columns in newspapers
- Children: Yasir Pirzada; Pirzada Muhammad Omar Qasmi; Pirzada Muhammad Ali Usman Qasmi

Ata ul Haq Qasmi (Punjabi, Urdu: عطا الحق قاسمی) is a Pakistani Urdu-language newspaper columnist, playwright and poet. He is the author of around 20 books and many articles on different subjects for the leading newspapers of Pakistan. His books have been translated into four languages.

== Early life and career ==
Qasmi was born in Amritsar, Punjab, British India, in 1943. His family has Kashmiri roots. His father Maulana Baha ul Haq Qasmi used to teach at MAO High School and MAO College in Amritsar. After the independence of Pakistan in 1947, his family migrated to Pakistan, first settling in Wazirabad and later moving to Lahore where he finished his high school. He graduated from Government M.A.O. College, Lahore. He first joined the Urdu language newspaper Nawa-i-Waqt as a sub-editor where the renowned journalist Majid Nizami was the editor. Later he started writing columns for Daily Jang and many other newspapers.

Qasmi has been praised for his "[...] satire on social inequalities of the society and his anti-dictatorship stance which he boldly takes in his columns."

He served as the Ambassador of Pakistan in Norway and Thailand from 1997 to 1999. His books and newspaper columns include Rozan-e-Dewar Sey, Column Tamam, Shar Goshiyan, Hansna Rona Mana Hay, Mazeed Ganjey Farishtey and many more while his TV Drama serials include the most popular PTV TV dramas Khawaja and Son (1988), "Shab Daig", Aap ka Khadim popularly known by its character Sheeda Taili and Khoye Hooun Ki Justajoo.

His travelogues Shoq-e-Awargi and Goron kay des mein are widely read and popular among the readers. In early 2015, he was serving as the honorary Chairman of the Lahore Arts Council, Lahore, Pakistan.

Pakistani journalist Altaf Gauhar once named him the wittiest newspaper columnist in Pakistan. Writer Mushtaq Ahmad Yusufi has called him the best newspaper columnist in the country. He has been working as a journalist for 52 years.

In 2015, he was appointed Chairman for Pakistan Television Corporation, a state-owned institution, where he served till December 2017. He has been associated and involved with Pakistani television for over 35 years as a playwright.

== Personal life ==
Ata ul Haq Qasmi has three sons: Pirzada Muhammad Omar Qasmi, Pirzada Muhammad Ali Usman Qasmi and Yasir Pirzada.

== Awards and recognition ==
- Pride of Performance Award by the President of Pakistan in 1991
- Sitara-i-Imtiaz (Star of Excellence) Award by the President of Pakistan
- Hilal-i-Imtiaz (Crescent of Excellence) Award by the President of Pakistan in 2014
- Nishan-e-Imtiaz (Order of Excellence) Award by the President of Pakistan in 2025
