= Madeeha Gauhar =

Pakistani actress, playwright, theater director and women's rights activist

- مدیحہ گوہر
- Born: 21 September 1956; Karachi, Pakistan
- Died: 25 April 2018 (aged 61); Lahore, Pakistan
- Occupations: Actress; Director and creator of the Ajoka Theatre
- Years active: 1973 – 2018
- Spouse: Shahid Nadeem (husband)
- Relatives: Faryal Gohar (sister); Sarang Nadeem (son); Nirvaan Nadeem (son); Savera Nadeem (daughter)
- Awards: See list in this article

Madeeha Gauhar (Urdu: مدیحہ گوہر; 21 September 1956 – 25 April 2018) was a Pakistani TV and stage actress, playwright, director of social theater, and women's rights activist. In 1984, she founded Ajoka Theatre where social themes were staged in theaters, on the street and in public places. With Ajoka Theater, she performed in Asia and Europe. She was one of the leading actresses on Pakistan's Television screens in the 1970s, 1980s and 1990s.

== Early life and career ==
Madeeha Gauhar was born in 1956 in Karachi, Pakistan. After obtaining a Master of Arts degree in English literature from Government College Lahore, she moved to England where she obtained another master's degree, studying theater science at the University of London.

In 1983, with her studies completed, she returned to her native country, settling in Lahore. She was involved in the Women's March on 12 February when she and others protested against the martial law regime. She was photographed being pushed back by a police officer.

Gauhar and her husband Shahid Nadeem founded Ajoka Theatre in 1984, a notable theater group of significance in the city. Ajoka (English:Current) elaborates on the oral tradition of Bhand and Nautanki and found a flourishing base in the area that overlaps the province of Punjab. Despite her educational background in the UK and China, Gauhar did not restrict herself to conventional classical Western theater techniques. Rather, she aimed to incorporate authentic Pakistani elements with contemporary sentiments. With Ajoka, Gauhar performed in Pakistan, and subsequently in many other countries. The troupe performed in the region such as India, Bangladesh, Nepal and Sri Lanka, as well as in several countries in Europe.

The most important motive of the shows, according to Gauhar, is the promotion of a just, humane, secular and equal society. She directed almost 36 plays which were performed in Pakistan as well as in other Asian countries. In directing performances in the theater, Gauhar utilised aesthetics and theatrical techniques to reflect the moral, social and political reality of contemporary Pakistan. A recurrent theme for her, as a feminist, was the subject of women's rights in a society that is greatly dominated by men.

In 2006, she was honored with a Prince Claus Award from the Netherlands. In 2007, she won the International Theatre Pasta Award.

In 2007, Ajoka performed a play that was written and directed by Gauhar, the Burqavaganza (Burqa-vaganza), which led to great controversy. Actors dressed in burkas acted out themes of sexual discrimination, intolerance and fanaticism. From a Western perspective, the piece was a rather innocent performance on hypocrisy of a society that bathes in corruption. In her own country, though, Members of Parliament called for a ban on the performance, and the Minister of Culture threatened with sanctions, if the stage play continued. The ban on the stage play was finally imposed as threatened, but the non-governmental organizations and women's rights activists had the play translated into English and did staged performances internationally as a sign of support to Ajoka.

== Major plays ==
- Toba Tek Singh based on Saadat Hasan Manto's short story
- Ek Thi Nani
- Bulha on Bulleh Shah's life
- Letters to Uncle Sam
- Hotel Mohenjodaro
- Lo Phir Basant Ayee

== Death and legacy ==
Madeeha Gauhar died in Lahore, Pakistan, on 25 April 2018 at the age of 61 after a three-year illness with cancer. Madeeha Gauhar tried to promote peace between India and Pakistan and tirelessly campaigned for it. She also was widely considered as one of Pakistan's leading women's rights activists. Madeeha Gauhar's Ajoka Theater's plays were frequently based on social and human rights issues - for example female literacy, honour killings, and religious extremism.

== Filmography ==
=== Television series ===
Year	Title	Role	Network
1975	Zanjeer	Suraiya	PTV
1979	Alif Laila	Malika	PTV
1982	Dhoop Dewar	Nargis	PTV
1982	Alif Noon	Police lady	PTV
1984	Sohni Mahiwal	Sohni	PTV
1985	Apnay Log	Rehana	PTV
1985	Ali Baba Aor Qasim Bhai	Aliya	PTV
1989	Neelay Hath	Nabeela Noman	PTV
1993	Zard Dopehar	Saira	PTV
1994	Alao	Irshad	PTV
1995	Uraan	Rehana	PTV
1995	Nashaib	Naseem	PTV
1997	Janjal Pura	Politician	PTV
2005	Azal	Samina	Indus TV

== Awards and nominations ==
Madeeha Gauhar received numerous awards for her theatrical efforts, including:

- At the first iteration of the 1st Indus Drama Awards in 2005, she was nominated for Best Actress Drama Serial in a Supporting Role.
- Madeeha Gauhar was nominated for the Nobel Peace Prize in 2005.
- In 2006, Gauhar was awarded Prince Claus Award in the Netherlands
- Tamgha-i-Imtiaz (Medal of Distinction), awarded to her by the President of Pakistan in 2003 for her efforts in improving Pakistani theatre.
- Fatima Jinnah Award by the Government of Pakistan in 2014

== See also ==
- National Women's Day (Pakistan)
