= Burqavaganza =

Play by Shahid Nadeem

Burqavaganza (Urdu: برقع وگینزا) is a controversial satirical play written by Shahid Nadeem about the burqa worn by conservative Muslim women, staged in Pakistan in 2010 by the Ajoka Theater Company.

== Ajoka Theatre ==
Ajoka Theatre is a drama group founded by playwright Madeeha Gauhar, with the goal of producing "socially meaningful theatre about women's issues and Sufi ideas."

== Controversy ==
Burkavaganza has received criticism with conservative members of the society for being blasphemous. Madeeha Gauhar, with the Ajoka Theatre group, stated in an interview with BBC that "the play is not designed to offend Islam or any other religion". In 2012 Gauhar stated "some people say it is burqa bashing. It certainly is not; it has many layers of meaning, and I think that's precisely why it was deemed subversive and subsequently it was not allowed to be performed." For some, "Burqavaganza" is a funny love story in the time of jihad. For others, it mocks Islam. Burqavaganza play has successfully brought Ajoka into the limelight because of its highly controversial theme.

== Government ban on the play ==
The government's ban on the play highlighted Pakistan's liberal-conservative divide. The ban was viewed by some commentators as an act of appeasement towards religious extremists by a government that was otherwise keen to promote a liberal ethos in the country.

A senior official at the Ministry of Culture said the play “pollutes young minds” and “should not be shown anywhere in Pakistan.” The Senate's cultural committee concluded a venomous debate by issuing a recommendation that “plays not hurt the feelings of anyone.”
