= Janjal Pura =

Comedy situation drama from Pakistan

- جنجال پورہ
- Genre: Drama; Humour
- Written by: Shahid Nadeem
- Directed by: Tariq Jamil
- Country of origin: Pakistan
- Original languages: Urdu, Punjabi
- No. of episodes: 30

Original release
- Network: Pakistan Television Corporation
- Release: 21 July 1996

Janjal Pura is a Pakistani humorous situation comedy television series broadcast on Pakistan Television Corporation, Lahore center, and was based on a stag play. The story is set in a fictional small town where residents, each driven by different passions and temperaments, constantly vie to outdo one another. At the heart of the drama lie themes of family planning and population control.

It was written by Shahid Nadeem and directed by Tariq Jamil. It first aired in 1996.

== Plot ==
Maasi Phatto, Raju Nai, Khwaja Sara Reema and Resham, cunning nurses of family planning and the newly appointed gynecologist lady doctor are some of the characters who live in the fictional town and try to raise the standard of living there. All of its inhabitants work hard in their respective fields, but they are not on good terms with each other and try to outdo each other. However, they unite when their hometown is threatened by some foreign danger.

== Cast ==
- Nayyar Ejaz as Cheemi Guru
- Mehmood Aslam as Reema
- Savera Nadeem as Dr. Mahjabeen
- Khalid Butt as Master Hidayat Ullah
- Madeeha Gauhar as Politician
- Asim Bukhari as Sheikh Sharakat
- Naseem Vicky as Chambeli
- Mehwish as Aapa Sughran
- Ashraf Khan as Kareem Bakhsh
- Jamil Fakhri as Salman Bakhsh
- Munir Nadir as Iman Bakhsh
- Iftikhar Ahmad as Imran Bakhsh
- Sarfraz Rana as Zulfi
- Aslam Shaheen as Arastu
