= Apnay Log =

Pakistani television long play

- Title screen
- اپنے لوگ
- Genre: Drama
- Written by: Amjad Islam Amjad
- Directed by: Mohammad Nisar Hussain
- Starring: Madeeha Gauhar; Abid Ali; Saba Hameed; Aurangzeb Leghari; Salman Shahid
- Country of origin: Pakistan
- Original language: Urdu

Production
- Producer: Mohammad Nisar Hussain

Original release
- Network: PTV
- Release: 1985 – 1985

Apnay Log (Urdu: اپنے لوگ, lit. 'Own People') is a 1985 Pakistani television long play. It was written by Amjad Islam Amjad, and directed and produced by Mohammad Nisar Hussain. Made at PTV's Lahore Centre, the play is routinely grouped with Waris, Dehleez, Samandar, Raat and Waqt as one of Amjad's best-known screenplays.

== Plot ==
Murad turns away from a government career and chooses teaching instead. He hopes to marry Rehana, but she tells him that her father won't accept a teacher as a son-in-law. Her father arranges her marriage to Murad's friend Iqtedar, and she goes through with it. Murad later marries Kulsoom, who comes from a poor family. He then loses his teaching post for refusing to accept terms laid down by Musharraf.

== Cast ==
- Madeeha Gauhar as Rehana
- Abid Ali as Murad
- Saba Hameed as Kulsoom
- Aurangzeb Leghari as Musharraf
- Salman Shahid as Iqtedar Ali
- Abid Kashmiri as Imran
- Mehboob Alam as Sarwar Ejaz
- Shabnam Zahid as Mehreen
- Mehmood Aslam as Mudassir
- Ejaz Qaiser as the Principal
- Tajamul Husain as Abdul Qaddus
- Baqir Ali as Javed
- Zahid Siddiq as the Professor
- Khursheed Shukat as Qureshi
- Asim Bukhari as Kulsoom's father
- Qayyum Shehzad as Farzand Ali
- Inayat Amjum as Yar Muhammad
- Ghayyur Akhtar as Mooda Pehlwan
- Munir Nadir as Pehlwan's man
- Khursheed Ali as Pehlwan's man
- Asif Seemab as a student
- Fozia Rehman as a student
- Humayun Sheikh as a student
- Nazneen Mazhar as a student
- Shahid Mubeen as a student
- Muhammad Zubair as Zubair
- Basit Khan as Shamim Akhtar
- Noman Shah as the Doctor

The cast appears in PTV's official episode listing.

== Production ==
Apnay Log was made for PTV's Lahore Centre in 1985 as a long play single, extended drama rather than a serial. Amjad had been a director at PTV from 1975 to 1979, and the script came out of the period in which he produced most of his best-received television work. He later said he would stopped writing for television altogether, putting it down to a drop in screenplay standards once private channels began to multiply.

== Reception ==
Profiles and obituaries of Amjad regularly count Apnay Log among his most popular PTV screenplays. Both Arab News and The Express Tribune have noted that several of his PTV plays drew international recognition, with Apne Log on the list. When Amjad died of a cardiac arrest on 10 February 2023, obituaries cited the play once again as part of his core body of television writing.
