= Uraan (1995 TV series) =

Pakistani television series

- اُڑان
- Genre: Drama
- Written by: Shahid Nadeem
- Directed by: Shahid Nadeem
- Starring: Faryal Gohar; Abid Ali; Savera Nadeem; Shakeel; Madeeha Gauhar; Naima Khan; Resham; Nabeel
- Country of origin: Pakistan
- Original language: Urdu
- No. of seasons: 1
- No. of episodes: 20

Production
- Producer: Muhammad Azeem

Original release
- Network: PTV
- Release: 1995 – 1995

Uraan (Urdu: اُڑان, lit. 'Flight') is a 1995 Pakistani television series set against the backdrop of Pakistan International Airlines, written and directed by Shahid Nadeem and produced by Muhammad Azeem. It aired on PTV and consists of 20 episodes.

== Synopsis ==
The series centres on the intersecting lives of airline passengers, cabin crew, and pilots, exploring personal and professional events set within the world of commercial aviation.

== Cast ==
- Shakeel as Captain Jamshed
- Abid Ali as Waqar
- Savera Nadeem as Faiza
- Faryal Gohar as Amira
- Madeeha Gauhar as Rehana
- Saba Hameed as Neelam
- Naima Khan as Tabbasum
- Ashraf Khan as Akhtar
- Jazba Sultan as Faiza's mother
- Nabeel as Khalid
- Nasreen Qureshi as Amira's mother
- Farooq Zameer as Amira's father
- Sohail Asghar as Akbar Ali
- Zulqarnain Haider as Abdul Baqi
- Shahid Nadeem as Farhan's father
- Sarfraz Rana as Ameen
- Nafees Hasan as Nafees
- Asim Bukhari as Darwesh Kamal
- Ismat Tahira as Nomi's grandmother
- Tamanna as Bibi Ji
- Nauman Ijaz as Adnan
- Iffat Rahim as Sara
- Hameed Sheikh as Bahadur
- Shaiyanne Malik as fashion photographer
- Wakeel Farooqi as Resham's father
- Aslam Shaheen as Sehwat
- Resham as plane passenger
- Zahid Qureshi as Masood
- Ajlal Bukhari as Shumail
- Ayesha Alam as air hostess
- Qaisar Ali as plane passenger
- Mehmood Aslam as Khanzada
- Javed Babar as Babar
- Shahnaz Khawaja as Shani
- Qavi Khan as Nawab Hussain
- Adnan Qavi as Mansoor
- Omar Pitras Waqar as Nomi

== Production ==
=== Filming ===
Principal photography took place in Karachi, with additional location shooting in Paris, London, New York City, Kathmandu, and Nairobi.

=== Stage adaptation ===
Shahid Nadeem also adapted Uraan as a stage play, which was performed at Ajoka Theatre.
