= Fareb (TV series) =

Pakistani television series

- Title screen
- فریب
- Genre: Drama
- Written by: Mustansar Hussain Tarar
- Directed by: Rashid Dar
- Starring: Rani Begum; Ajab Gul; Naima Khan; Aurangzeb Leghari; Nida Mumtaz
- Country of origin: Pakistan
- Original language: Urdu
- No. of seasons: 1
- No. of episodes: 13

Production
- Producer: Rashid Dar

Original release
- Network: PTV
- Release: 1993 – 1993

Fareb (Urdu: فریب, lit. 'Deception') is a 1993 Pakistani television drama series written by Mustansar Hussain Tarar and produced and directed by Rashid Dar. It aired on PTV. It is among Tarar's noted works for PTV, alongside Hazaron Raaste and Parinda.

== Plot ==
Fareb follows two principal storylines. Shabahat, devoted to by her father Bashiruddin, is betrayed by her fiancé and subsequently leaves for the United States. Yasir, who aspires to a career in the police, marries Gulzar Begum, a woman from a wealthy family, and sets out to expose the corrupt Sultan Khan.

== Cast ==
- Rani Begum as Shabahat (Haashi Bi)
- Ajab Gul as Yasher Kamal
- Naima Khan as Gulzar Begum
- Aurangzeb Leghari as Sultan Khan
- Nida Mumtaz as Maryam
- Ashraf Khan as Sheru
- Irfan Khoosat as Najeeb-ullah
- Ghayyur Akhtar as Naseem Khan
- Nighat Butt as Sakeena
- Munawar Saeed as Bashir-ud-din Arslan
- Qavi Khan as Ameer-ud-din Arslan
- Khalid Moin Butt as Naseer-ud-din Arslan
- Mehr-un-Nisa as Bano
- Sania as Sara
- Farkhanda as Sara's mother
- Saeed Sheikh as Lamboo
- Mohsin Rizvi as Bahar Deen
- Altaf Ur Rehman as Maqsood Bamchhik
- C.M. Munir as Nabi Bakhsh
- Shoukat Zaidi as Kamal-ud-deen
- Arshad Niazi as Gul Zaman Matka
- Saleem Zahid as Faqeer-ud-deen
- Munir Narang as Shahid's Associate
- Noman Shah as Aftab
- Azfar Tahir as Doctor Zubair
- Rasheed Ali as Hakeem Saeed-ul-Hasan
- Shabbir Hussain as Police Officer
- Qudsia Bano as Massi
- Nazar Abbas as Fazal Kalia
- Suljuk Mustansar Tarar as Taimoor
- Khursheed Shaukat as Khadim Hussain
- Mujahid Abbas as Dilshad
