= Naima Khan =

Pakistani actress

- نعیمہ خان
- Born: 26 October 1972 (age 53); Lahore, Punjab, Pakistan
- Education: University of Lahore
- Occupation: Actress
- Years active: 1987 – present
- Spouse: Rashid Ahmad Khan (husband)
- Children: 3
- Relatives: Ashfaq Ahmad (uncle); Bano Qudsia (aunt)

Naima Khan (born 26 October 1972) is a Pakistani actress. She is known for her roles in dramas Tum Mere Kya Ho, Saya-e-Dewar Bhi Nahi, Shehnai, Yaqeen Ka Safar, Yeh Dil Mera and Uraan.

== Early life ==
Naima was born on 26 October 1972 in Lahore. She completed her studies from University of Lahore. Her father, Anwar Elahi Khan, was in the Pakistan Air Force and her mother was an Aalima Fazila and a radio artist who played the character of Zohran Bibi in the famous radio play, Talqeen Shah. Her mother, Zakia Khanum, was a cousin of famous Urdu writer and playwright Ashfaq Ahmad. Naima Khan joined the industry in 1987.

== Career ==
She started her acting on PTV by appearing in dramas PTV in 1987. She was noted for her roles in dramas Patt Jharr, Fareb, Nashaib, Zeeshan, Aik Qadam Par Manzil, Fishaar and Chandpur ka Chando. She also appeared in drama Adhoori Aurat along with Ayeza Khan and Faysal Qureshi and Khuda Aur Muhabbat with Imran Abbas and Sadia Khan. Since then she appeared in dramas Tum Mere Kya Ho, Saya-e-Dewar Bhi Nahi, Yaqeen Ka Safar and Yeh Dil Mera, Beti, Jo Tu Chahey.

== Personal life ==
Naima is married to Rashid Ahmad Khan and has 2 daughters named Halima Khan and Hifza Khan. Her eldest daughter, Rabia Khan, died at the age of 5 to 6 years in 1993.

== Filmography ==
=== Television ===
Year	Title	Role	Network
1987	Waadi	Jalal Khan's wife	PTV
1988	Sanata	Najma	PTV
1988	Mirat-ul-Uroos	Tamasha	PTV
1988	Teesra Khat	Saba	PTV
1989	Neelay Hath	Bari Phuppo	PTV
1990	Fishaar	Lalarukh	PTV
1991	Patt Jharr	Jameela	PTV
1991	Nashaib	Arifa	PTV
1992	Din	Imtenan's wife	PTV
1992	Sofia	Tahira	PTV
1992	Zeeshan	Nusrat	PTV
1993	Doosra Aasman	Mahira's mother	PTV
1993	Fareb	Gulzar Begum	PTV
1994	Chiryan Da Chamba	Suriaya	PTV
1994	Takmeel	Cheemo	PTV
1994	Akhri Baat	Aliya	PTV
1995	Zard Dopehar	Mrs. Shahida Nabeel	PTV
1995	Uraan	Tabbasum	PTV
1996	Zaroorat	Samina	PTV
1996	Teesra Aadmi	Nighat	PTV
1997	Family Front	Mrs. Kamal	PTV
1998	Aik Qadam Par Manzil	Aabi	PTV
1998	Laag	Riffat Ara	PTV
1998	Rahain	Aapa	PTV
1999	Boota from Toba Tek Singh	Sarwat Begum	PTV
1999	Chandpur ka Chandoo	Peeno	PTV
2000	Anaa	Saira Begum	PTV
2000	Dopatta		PTV
2005	Khayal	Nazma	PTV
2010	Teri Gali Mein	Roheda	ARY Digital
2010	Natak Mandi	Sarah's mother-in-law	PTV
2011	Hulla Ray	Shagufta	TV One
2011	Afsar Be-Kar-E-Khas	Mrs. Ejaz	PTV
2012	Nikhar Gaye Gulab Sare	Sheharyal's mother	Hum TV
2012	Sirat-e-Mustaqeem	Raheela	Express Entertainment
2013	Bhool	Raza's mother	PTV
2013	Adhoori Aurat	Maryam's mother	Geo TV
2013	Aasmanon Pay Likha	Abda	Geo Entertainment
2014	Uff Yeh Mohabbat	Rukiya	Geo TV
2014	Aik Pal	Noor Fatima's mother	Hum TV
2015	Mahi Ray	Hafsa's mother	PTV
2015	Maikey Ko Dedo Sandes	Maryam's mother	Geo TV
2015	Tum Mere Kya Ho	Ammi	PTV
2015	Chandan Haar	Samreen	A-Plus
2015	Inteha	Lubna	Express Entertainment
2015	Ali Ki Ammi	Rasheeda	Geo Entertainment
2015	Maan	Maheen	Hum TV
2015	Ishqaaway	Noor Jahan	Geo Entertainment
2016	Saya-e-Dewar Bhi Nahi	Zubaida	Hum TV
2016	Gila	Noor Bano	Hum TV
2017	Badnaam	Suriya	ARY Digital
2017	Naseebon Jali	Maheeta	Hum TV
2017	Yaqeen Ka Safar	Jehangir's mother	Hum TV
2017	Khuda Aur Muhabbat Season 2	Rasheeda	Geo Entertainment
2017	Alif Allah Aur Insaan	Chaman Begum	Hum TV
2018	Noor Bibi	Sultana	Geo Entertainment
2018	Beti	Fareeda	ARY Digital
2019	Jo Tu Chahey	Fasiha	Hum TV
2019	Yeh Dil Mera	Nargis Bua	Hum TV
2021	Shehnai	Saiqa	ARY Digital
2021	Ruswaiyaan	Zain's mother	SAB TV
2022	Teri Rah Mein	Najma	ARY Digital
2022	Hoor Pari Noor	Fazeelat	Express Entertainment
2022	Guddu	Ujala's aunt	Geo Entertainment
2022	Ishq Nahin Aasan	Bilquis	Aan TV
2022	Qalandar	Qudsia	Geo Entertainment
2023	Tumhare Husn Ke Naam	Hamida	Green Entertainment
2024	Akhara	Bushra	Green Entertainment
2024	Pas-e-Deewar	Rashida	Green Entertainment
2025	Adhi Bewafayi	Razia	Hum TV
2025	Rasam-e-Wafa	Samina	ARY Digital
2025	Pamaal	Farzana	Green Entertainment

=== Telefilm ===
Year	Title	Role
2021	Hangor S-131	Allaudin's mother

=== Film ===
Year	Title	Role
2011	Bol	Master's wife
2016	Saya e Khuda e Zuljalal	Safia
