= Teesra Kinara =

Pakistani television series

- Title screen
- تیسرا کنارا
- Genre: Family; Drama
- Based on: The Fountainhead by Ayn Rand
- Written by: Rahat Kazmi
- Directed by: Shahzad Khalil
- Starring: Rahat Kazmi; Sahira Kazmi; Usman Peerzada; Saba Hameed; Badar Khalil; Shafi Muhammad Shah
- Theme music composer: M. Ashraf; Shamim Ahmed
- Composer: Khalil Ahmad
- Country of origin: Pakistan
- Original language: Urdu
- No. of seasons: 1
- No. of episodes: 13

Production
- Producer: Shahzad Khalil

Original release
- Network: PTV
- Release: 1980 – 1980

Teesra Kinara (Urdu: تیسرا کنارا, lit. 'The Third Bank') is a 1980 Pakistani television series written by Rahat Kazmi and based on Ayn Rand's novel The Fountainhead. It was produced and directed by Shahzad Khalil. The series aired on PTV and ran for thirteen episodes. The series is regarded as one of the best 80s colour-TV serials. Its iconic OST is the classic ghazal "Kabhi Hum Khoobsurat Thay" and it was sung by Nayyara Noor.

== Plot ==
The series follows Ali (Rahat Kazmi), an architecture student who is expelled from his department for refusing to conform to conventional design principles. His close friend Raheel Obaid (Usman Peerzada) takes a more orthodox path, joining an established architecture firm and attaining conventional success. Ali later meets Mehreen (Sahira Kazmi), a newspaper reporter and critic, and comes into conflict with Babar Kamal (Shafi Muhammad Shah), a businessman. A parallel storyline follows Shazia (Badar Khalil), a well-known actress, who asks Raheel to befriend her daughter Salma (Saba Hameed), a resident of a girls' hostel.

Drawing on the central themes of The Fountainhead, the series examines the tension between individualism and collectivism, chiefly through the professions of architecture and journalism. Ali is portrayed as a gifted but uncompromising figure who declines the Dean's offer to return to university a year after his expulsion. His unconventional designs place him at odds with established professionals and academics, and he struggles to secure work despite his evident ability. Raheel Obaid, by contrast, thrives within the prevailing system: he graduates at the top of his class, is recruited by a prominent firm, and is widely respected in his professional circles.

Mehreen, the daughter of a prominent businessman who owns the firm employing Raheel, works as a critic for a newspaper called Jazbat. Dissatisfied with her profession and the repetitive nature of reviewing similar projects, she is pursued by several suitors but is drawn only to Ali. Though she privately identifies with individualist ideals, she remains constrained by her employer.

A recurring motif in the series is self-awareness, with the principal characters shown to be unusually conscious of their own abilities, limitations, and the perceptions others hold of them.

== Cast ==
- Rahat Kazmi as Ali
- Sahira Kazmi as Mehreen
- Usman Peerzada as Raheel Obaid
- Saba Hameed as Salma
- Badar Khalil as Shazia
- Shafi Muhammad Shah as Babar Kamal
- Tani Begum as Begum Aziz
- Khursheed Shahid as Mrs. Zaidi
- Badi Uzzaman as Haleem Hafazi
- Jameel Fakhri as Khatir
- Khalid Butt as Sikandar
- Asim Bukhari as Ameer-ud-Din
- Atiya Sharaf as Mehreen's mother (older)
  - Reena as Mehreen's mother (younger)
- Abid Kashmiri as Banker
- Munir Nadir as Sultan
- Abid Butt as Khawaja
- Irfan Hashmi as Worker
- C. M. Munir as Professor
- Altaf-ur-Rehman as Qasim Jaffery
- Mirza Ghazanfar Baig as Chairman

== Soundtrack ==
The music for the series was composed by Shamin Ahmed and performed by Nayyara Noor.

Tracklist
No.	Title	Singer(s)	Length
1.	"Kabhi Hum Khoobsurat"	Nayyara Noor	2:44
