= Ishrat Afreen =

Pakistani poet

- Born: Ishrat Jehan; 25 December 1956 (age 69); Karachi, Pakistan
- Other name: Ishrat Aafreen
- Occupations: Urdu poet, writer
- Known for: Part of the feminist movement in Urdu literature

Ishrat Afreen (born Ishrat Jehan; alternative spelling of pen name: Ishrat Aafreen; born 25 December 1956) is an Urdu poet. Her works have been translated into several languages, including English, Japanese, Sanskrit, and Hindi. The ghazal singers Jagjit Singh and Chitra Singh performed her poetry in their anthology Beyond Time (1987), and Zia Mohyeddin has recited her nazms in his 17th and 20th recorded volumes, as well as in his ongoing concerts.

== Early life and education ==
Afreen was born Ishrat Jehan in Karachi into an educated family, the eldest of five children. She was first published at the age of fourteen in the Daily Jang, with the date of that publication given in secondary sources as 31 April 1971. She continued writing and was published in numerous literary magazines across India and Pakistan.

She pursued undergraduate studies at Allama Iqbal Government College, Karachi, and later received a master's degree in Urdu literature from the University of Karachi. She also taught at the Aga Khan School and boarding house.

== Career ==
Afreen became assistant editor of the monthly magazine Awaaz, edited by the poet Fahmida Riaz. Alongside her writing, she participated in several radio programmes on Radio Pakistan from 1970 to 1984 that were broadcast nationally and internationally. She later worked under Mirza Jamil on the Noori Nastaliq Urdu script for InPage.

Afreen is currently the principal Urdu lecturer for The University of Texas at Austin's Hindi Urdu Flagship Program.

== Personal life ==
In 1985, Afreen married Syed Perwaiz Jafri, an Indian lawyer, and settled in India. The couple moved to the United States in 1990 and now reside in Houston, Texas. They have three children.

== Publications ==
Afreen has published two collections of poetry: Kunj Peeleh Poolon Ka (1985) and Dhoop Apne Hisse Ki (2005). Her work was included in the anthology Beyond Belief: Contemporary Feminist Urdu Poetry (Lahore: ASR Publications, 1990), edited and translated by Rukhsana Ahmad, which was later republished in the United Kingdom in 1991 under the title We Sinful Women: Contemporary Urdu Feminist Poetry.
