= Khawaja and Son =

Situation comedy TV drama of Pakistan

- Genre: Drama, Family
- Written by: Ata ul Haq Qasmi
- Directed by: Ayub Khawar
- Starring: Ali Ejaz; Aurangzeb; Arifa Siddiqui; Huma Hameed; Khayyam Sarhadi; Fauzia Rehman; Muhammad Zubair; Samina Khalid; Jazba Sultan; Ismat Tahira; Ghayyur Akhtar
- Country of origin: Pakistan
- Original language: Urdu
- No. of episodes: 8

Production
- Producer: Pakistan Television Corporation

Original release
- Network: Pakistan Television Corporation
- Release: 1985 – 1985

Khajawa and Son, Pakistani TV show (began in 1985) is a comedy serial that revolves around Khawaja Sahib (played by Ali Ejaz) and his son Jawad (played by Aurangzeb).

It is directed by Ayub Khawar and written by Ata ul Haq Qasmi.

== Plot ==
As a father, Khawaja Sahib is quick to catch on to any mistakes or wrong steps his son takes and is ever ready to correct him. His major correction tool is twisting the ears of his son, who is a full grown adult. With his father not giving him much room to breathe and his nine sisters continuously placing demands on him, there is not much fun out there for Jawad. His loss is the TV viewer's gain as the products of these interactions, the comical scenes and situations, are a treat to watch. This drama series provides a comic relief while talking about social issues in Pakistani society.

This TV comedy drama is for those who appreciate the value of principles, family values, and respect for elders, and above all have an insatiable appetite for fun and humor. Khawaja and Son makes for light viewing, isn't taxing on the brain and therefore can be viewed over and over again.

Ali Ejaz's comical role as Khawaja Sahib is a revelation. His dialogue delivery is quite exceptional, especially when he suddenly switches to speaking in English (broken and forced); this is a source of much amusement for the viewers. The TV series director Ayub Khawar is quite skillful in doing his job and is highly rated among the TV directors of Pakistan.

== Cast ==
- Ali Ejaz as Khawaja Sahib (plays the father's role)
- Aurangzeb as Jawad (plays the son's role)
- Ghayyur Akhtar as Javed
- Arifa Siddiqui as Samina
- Samina Khalid as Nabeela
- Shaista Jabeen as Rubina
- Ismat Tahira as Rabia
- Najma Begum as Ruqayya
- Iram Kanwal as Yasmeen
- Fakhri Ahmed as Chaudhry A.W
- Fauzia Rehman as Aasia
- Huma Hameed as Khalida
- Jazba Sultan as Razia
- Khayyam Sarhadi as Khalda's husband
- Muhammad Sharif as Udas
- Salma Khan as Nabeela's Mother
- Akhtar Shad as Doctor Anwar
- Shama Chaudhry as Zahid's Mother
- Tauqeer Nisar as Zahid
- Zahir Khan as Rafiq
- Tajammal Hussain as Raqayya's Husband
