= Manto (TV series) =

2017 Pakistani biographical television series

- Written by: Shahid Nadeem
- Directed by: Sarmad Khoosat
- Starring: Sarmad Khoosat; Sania Saeed; Saba Qamar; Arjumand Rahim; Nimra Bucha
- Country of origin: Pakistan
- Original language: Urdu
- No. of episodes: 20

Production
- Producers: Asif Raza Mir; Babar Javed
- Cinematography: Khizer Idrees
- Production company: A&B Entertainment

Original release
- Network: Har Pal Geo
- Release: 3 November 2017 – 16 March 2018

Manto is a 2017 Pakistani television biographical drama series, directed by Sarmad Khoosat who also played the title role in the series, produced by Babar Javed and Asif Raza Mir under banner A&B Entertainment. The other cast includes Sania Saeed, Saba Qamar, Arjumand Rahim and Nimra Bucha in prominent roles. The drama portrays the life of the iconic Urdu novelist Saadat Hasan Manto.

== Cast ==
- Sarmad Khoosat as Saadat Hassan Manto
- Sania Saeed as Safia Manto
- Saba Qamar as Noor Jehan
- Arjumand Rahim as Bulwant Kaur
- Asad Siddiqui as Masood
- Akbar Subhani as Muhammad Hussain
- Mizna Waqas as Minal
- Qaiser Naqvi as Safia's mother
- Yasra Rizvi as Balwant Kaur
- Mahira Khan as Madari
- Sarmed Mirza as Shaukat Thanvi
- Azfar Rehman as Passenger

== Production ==
In 2012, it was reported that Sarmad Khoosat is directing a TV series based on the life and literary work of Saadat Hassan Manto. It had a total of 20 episodes and was also made as the film. Both the film and the television series were directed by Khoosat, who also played the title character. Playwright Shahid Nadeem served as a screenwriter and Babar Javed produced the serial and film under A & B Entertainment at Geo Films. The series was scheduled to release in 2012, but was put on hold for the film production. In 2016, it was revealed that Khoosat's film will be aired on television with the same cast. The series originally aired on Geo Entertainment from 3 November 2017.

== Reception ==
One review on Images described it as a thoughtful look at Manto and complimented several performances.
