= Din (TV series) =

Pakistani television series

- Title screen
- دن
- Genre: Drama
- Written by: Amjad Islam Amjad
- Directed by: Ayub Khawar
- Starring: Waseem Abbas; Qavi Khan; Nida Mumtaz; Bindiya; Nabeel; Mehmood Aslam; Resham
- Country of origin: Pakistan
- Original language: Urdu
- No. of seasons: 1
- No. of episodes: 18

Production
- Producer: Haider Imam Rizvi

Original release
- Network: PTV
- Release: 1992 – 1992

Din (Urdu: دن, lit. 'Day') is a 1992 Pakistani television drama series written by Amjad Islam Amjad, directed by Ayub Khawar, and produced by Haider Imam Rizvi. Produced at the PTV Lahore Centre, it deals with feudalism, politics, and the family, centring on an upright civil servant.

== Plot ==
Din follows Ehsan, an honest civil servant, and his children Zeeshan and Shaheen, who wish to pursue education and contribute to the development of their village. The village, however, is dominated by a feudal lord, Sardar Dilawar, whose arbitrary authority constrains those around him. Tabinda eventually enters Dilawar's life and attempts to reform him.

== Cast ==
- Afzaal Ahmed as Wahab
- Waseem Abbas as Faran
- Qavi Khan as Ehsan
- Nida Mumtaz as Shaheen
- Bindiya as Tabinda
- Mehmood Aslam as Sardar Dilawar
- Resham as Nawal
- Nabeel as Zeeshan
- Naima Khan as Imtenan's Wife
- Sohail Ahmed as Badruddin
- Asad Tadeer as Mushtaq
- Ismat Tahira as Zahid's Mother
- Javed Rizvi as Kamali
- Aneeq Naji as Qamar
- Nayyar Ejaz as Dewan
- Ziwayya as Maria
- Wajid Bukhari as Sardar
- Tauseef Khan as Imtenan
- Saleem Pasha as Mulazim
- Simra Afzal as Maheen
- Mehmood Akhtar as Akhtar
- Zahid Qureshi as Aadmi
- Afshan Bhatti as Wife
- Neelam Khalid as Wahab's Wife
- Naeem Butt as Police Inspector

== Broadcast ==
Due to its popularity, the series was rebroadcast by PTV Home under the PTV Gold Hour strand.
