= Ayub Khawar =

Pakistani television director

- ایوب خاور
- Born: Ayub Khawar; 12 June 1948 (age 78); Chakwal, Punjab, Pakistan
- Occupations: Poet; Author; Television director; Television producer
- Years active: 1976 – present
- Known for: Director of TV situation comedy drama Khawaja and Son (1985)
- Awards: Pride of Performance Award by the President of Pakistan in 2014

Ayub Khawar is a Pakistani poet, author, and television director. He directed many of the TV serials for Pakistan Television including Khawaja and Son, Fishaar, Din, Qasmi Kahani, Gharib-e-Shehar, Pataal and Gulzar Classics.

He is the author of more than 50 books. He has also been nominated twice for Best TV Director at Lux Style Awards.

== Early life ==
Khawar was born in Chakwal on 12 June 1948. He got his earlier education from there and went on to Karachi for higher studies. He got his Masters degree in Urdu literature from the University of Karachi. As he finished his basic education in Chakwal, his father was serving in the Pakistan Army in Karachi at that time. He was asked to come to Karachi by his father to live with him. Khawar ended up finishing all his higher education in Karachi.

== Career ==
=== Television career ===
His career in mass media spans over four decades, from 1976 to 2004 during which he served as head of projects, television producer, and director on Satellite and Terrestrial TV channels. Some of his directorial projects include Khawaja and Son (1985), Din (1992), Nashaib (1995), Qasmi Kahani (1995), Gharib-e-Shehar (1999), Pataal (2004), and Gulzar Classics (2009).

In 2022, he is serving as the project head of the popular comedy talk show Mazaaq Raat, which broadcasts on Dunya News. He is now settled in Lahore.

=== Literary career ===
Khawar started writing poems and poetry in his college days. By the end of his education, he was a well-known poet among literary circles. More than 50 books of his have been published which included both poetry and prose, while some of the poetry has been translated into English as well.

He was first introduced to the Indian Urdu-language poet, lyricist and author Gulzar by Ahmed Nadeem Qasmi.

== Television ==
Khawar has directed the following television series:

- Khawaja and Son (1985)
- Fishaar (1990)
- Din (1992)
- Qasmi Kahani (1994)
- Girah
- Hisaar
- Nasheb (1995)
- Daldal
- Heer Ranjha (1996)
- Apney Prayey
- Ali Baba Aur 40 Chor (TV series)
- Ghareeb-e-Sheher (1999)
- Kaanch ke Par (2000)
- Inkaar (2000)
- Dil Lagi (2003)
- Pataal (2004)
- Yeh Bhi Kisi Ki Beti Hay (2005)
- Gulzar Classics (2009)

== Selected bibliography ==
Some of his writing work include:

- Gul Mausam-e-Khazan (1992)
- Mohabbat Ki Kitaab
- Love in the First of Terrorism
- Bohat Kuch Kho Gaya Hai (2010)
- Tumhein Jaane Ki Jaldi Thee
- Symphony & Other Poems

== Awards and honours ==
- Pride of Performance Award by the President of Pakistan in 2014.
- 2005 - Best TV Director at the 4th Lux Style Awards - for Pataal
- 2006 - Nominated - Best TV Director at the 5th Lux Style Awards - for Yeh Bhi Kisi Ki Beti Hai
