= Jameel Fakhri =

Pakistani actor

Jamil Fakhri
- جمیل فخری
- Born: Mohammad Jamil; 15 September 1946; Lahore, Punjab, Pakistan
- Died: 9 June 2011 (aged 64); Lahore, Punjab, Pakistan
- Occupation: Actor
- Years active: 1978–2009
- Awards: Pride of Performance Award by the President of Pakistan in 2002; Nigar Award in 1981

Jamil Fakhri (Urdu: جمیل فخری; 15 September 1946 – 9 June 2011) was a veteran Pakistani film, TV and stage artist. He gained popularity from Pakistan Television Corporation's TV drama serial Andhera Ujala (1984), in which he played the police inspector Jaffer Hussain. In Andhera Ujala, senior police officer Qavi Khan and his team of junior and mid-level police fight crime in their locality, creating both very humorous situations and drawing attention to serious social issues.

== Early life and career ==
Jamil Fakhri was born in Lahore, Pakistan in 1946. After finishing his basic education, he started working for National Bank of Pakistan. Then he started doing theater at WAPDA Auditorium and Alhamra Arts Council, and worked with some already established TV actors and directors. He got his break with Athar Shah Khan Jaidi's series Andar Aana Mana Hai (1978). Fakhri worked with many prominent TV actors of the time including Irfan Khoosat, Khayyam Sarhadi, Firdous Jamal, Masood Akhtar, Kamal Ahmed Rizvi, and Nanha. He also worked with some top TV producers and directors in the 1980s, including Yawar Hayat Khan, Rashid Dar (director of the above-mentioned TV drama Andhera Ujala), Kamal Ahmed Rizvi and many more. Besides acting in television dramas, he also acted in more than 50 Pakistani films.

== TV dramas ==
- Tanay Banay (TV drama)
- Waris (1979)
- Teesra Kinara (1980)
- Alif Noon (1982)
- Wadi-e-Purkhar (1983)
- Ragon Main Andhera (1983)
- Andhera Ujala (1984)
- Neelay Hath (1989)
- Ureek
- Aaj Ka Khel
- Alif Laila
- Jheel
- Zakhira Andozi
- Ek Muhabbat Sau Afsanay

== Awards and recognition ==
- Pride of Performance Award by the President of Pakistan in 2002.
- Nigar Award- Best Comedian award in film Yeh Zamana Aur Hai (1981).

== Death and legacy ==
According to Jamil Fakhri's family, he first learned on 7 December 2010 that his son, Ali Ayaz Fakhri, who had been living in the United States, had been kidnapped and later killed. According to reports about his son's gruesome murder, his body was cut up into pieces and then set on fire. This really distressed the actor and took a heavy toll on his health for several months until finally he had a stroke on 31 May 2011. He was hospitalized in a coma for many days and died on 9 June 2011 at Lahore, the city of his birth.

He left behind three other sons, and a widow. In his condeolnece message, Farrukh Bashir, General Manager of Pakistan Television, Lahore Center, said that Jamil Fakhri had remained associated with PTV for a long time and in his death, PTV had also lost a great artist. He was buried in Miani Sahib Graveyard, Lahore near the shrine of Ilm-ud-Shaheed.
