= Nishtar Hall =

Cultural centre in Peshawar, Pakistan

Coordinates: 34.0123°N 71.5642°E

Nishtar Hall is a cultural centre and music venue in Peshawar, Pakistan. It was established to promote and represent the Pashtun culture and music. Hall was established in 1985. It is an only and large entertainment venue in Peshawar with a capacity of 600 people. It remained closed for eight years and opened again in 2000s.

== History ==
Hall was established in 1985 to promote culture of Khyber Pakhtunkhwa. It was named after a Pashtun freedom fighter Sardar Abdur Rab Nishtar. In start it was organised by the Abasin Arts Council and later by Cultural Department of Khyber Pakhtunkhwa.
