= Family Front =

- Title screen
- Also known as: Title screen for Family Front
- Genre: Comedy; Drama; Sitcom
- Created by: Waseem Abbas
- Written by: Muhammad Younis Butt
- Directed by: Waseem Abbas
- Starring: Saba Hameed; Samina Ahmad; Waseem Abbas; Mira Hashmi; Anjum Shahzad; Naima Khan; Naseem Vicky; Iram Hassan; Iffat Rahim; Seemi Raheel; Nadia Jamil
- Country of origin: Pakistan
- Original language: Urdu
- No. of seasons: 1
- No. of episodes: 189

Production
- Producer: Younis Butt
- Running time: 25 minutes
- Production companies: Younis Butt Production; PTV Home

Original release
- Network: PTV Home; Star Plus
- Release: 1 January 1997 – 21 May 1999

Family Front (Urdu: فیملی فرنٹ) is a 1997 Pakistani comedy drama sitcom television series. It was broadcast by the Pakistan Television Corporation (PTV World, now PTV News). The sitcom was directed by Waseem Abbas and written by Muhammad Younis Butt.

The cast included Saba Hameed, Samina Ahmad, Waseem Abbas, Mira Hashmi, Naima Khan, Iram Hassan, Iffat Rahim, Anjum Shahzad and Naseem Vicky. This comedy show became highly popular and ran for many TV seasons. A spin-off sequel, titled Hum Sab Ajeeb Se Hain later aired on Aaj Entertainment. The show was also aired on STAR Plus International in 1999.

Younis Butt used a format characterized by miscommunication, pun-based dialogue, and situational comedy within a 25-minute runtime, an approach he continued in later television projects. The series brought wider public recognition to several cast members. Anjum Shahzad won a PTV Award for his portrayal of Bobby, while Naseem Vicky later expanded his career into stage theatre and international television.

== Cast ==
- Waseem Abbas as Azam
- Saba Hameed as Sumbal
- Samina Ahmad as Nusrat
- Anjum Shahzad as Naveed "Bobby"
- Naseem Vicky as Khushiya
- Mira Hashmi as Huma in early episodes
- Urooj Nasir as Huma in later episodes
- Ashraf Khan as Dr. Qubool
- Seemi Raheel as Ani (Choti Phopo)
- Sardar Kamal as Shaukat
- Naima Khan as Mrs. Kamal
- Shakila Qureshi as Shakeela
- Iram Hassan as Salma
- Shujaat Hashmi as Khushiya's uncle
- Nadia Jamil as Nadia
- Sardar Kamal as Shaukat
- Irfan Khoosat as Laag Baig
- Amjad Islam Amjad as Amjad Islam Amjad
- Ayesha Sana as Mano
- Babu Baral as Akram
- Fareeha Jabeen as Begum Qanchi
- Afshan Qureshi as Begum Amir
- Nadia Afgan as Bushra
- Jana Malik as Natasha
- Farhana Maqsood
- Nasir Chinyoti
- Sohail Ahmed
- Kashif Mehmood
- Abid Khan as Cash Khan, a property dealer
- Iffat Rahim as Seema

== Reception ==
Writing for the Dawn Images, Rashid Sami found it as the only comedy series that can be termed as "quality production" and further wrote that, "Though recorded on filmi format it has managed to keep a grip on script, treatment and performance."
