= Andhera Ujala =

Pakistani television series

- Title screen
- Genre: Drama; Police procedural
- Written by: Younis Javed
- Directed by: Rashid Dar
- Starring: Qavi Khan; Rahat Kazmi; Jameel Fakhri; Abid Butt; Irfan Khoosat
- Country of origin: Pakistan
- Original language: Urdu
- No. of episodes: 52

Original release
- Network: PTV
- Release: 1984 – 1985

Andhera Ujala (Urdu: اندھیرا اجالا, English: Darkness, Brightness) is a Pakistani crime investigation television series that aired on Pakistan Television (PTV) in 1984–85, written by Younis Javed and directed by Rashid Dar.

It also had an occasional touch of comic moments, mainly centred upon the character of constable Karam Dad. The leading cast of the series included Irfan Khoosat, Jamil Fakhri, Qavi Khan, Rahat Kazmi and Abid Butt (sub-inspector). The main theme of this TV series was based on the 1983 drama Ragon mein Andhera, which aired on 29 December 1983, that depicted a police team's efforts to fight crime and the spread of narcotics in their locality. The series has had numerous reruns and become a cult classic.

== Cast ==
=== Main cast ===
- Qavi Khan as ASP Tahir Ali Khan
- Jameel Fakhri as (SHO) Inspector Jaffar Hussain
- Abid Butt as Sub Inspector Mehmood
- Javed Piya as ASI Mian Khan
- Mureed Ahmed as Head Constable Rehmat Khan
- Mumtaz Waseem as Constable Latif (Teefa Kaatha)
- M. Shareef (Muhammad Sharif) as Constable Nawa Parauhna
- Mahmood as Constable Allah Ditta
- Anwar Ali as Sharafat Chuhar Kanvi (episodes: Sawal, Shana Bashana)
- Irfan Khoosat as Havaldar Karam Dad

=== Recurring cast ===
- Asim Bukhari (different roles)
- Munawar Saeed (different roles)
- Zaib Rehman as Neeli
- Yasmeen Ismail as Begum
- Talat Siddiqui as Tahir's mother
- Samina Ahmad as Anjum
- Afshan Qureshi as Jaffar Begum
- Shakila Qureshi as Sajida
- Mehboob Alam as Police officer
- Aurangzeb Leghari as Raheel
- Khayam Sarhadi as Naeem
- Firdous Jamal as Arif
- Tauqeer Nasir as Qaidi Number 9
- Saba Hameed as Rubi
- Sehrish Khan as Saima
- Tahira Wasti as Nasir's mother
- Rubina Ashraf as Romana
- Bindiya as Nasreen
- Faysal Quraishi as Taha
- Firdous Jamal as Arif
- Nighat Butt as Nasreen's mother
- Waseem Abbas as Nasir
- Khursheed Shahid as Zainab
- Sarwat Ateeq as Muneer Begum
- Jazba Sultan as Begum Aziz
- Ismat Tahira
- Faiza Hasan as Zubaida
- Atiya Sharaf as Amma
- Lalarukh Hameed as Rubina
- Khalid Moin Butt as Anwar
- Rashid Mahmood (different roles)

== Accolades ==
Year	Award	Category	Result	Recipients and nominees	Ref.
1984	Nigar Award	Best Actor	Won	Jameel Fakhri	

== Sequel ==
A sequel of Andhera Ujala was launched in 2019 with a new cast as well as the two old characters of Qavi Khan and Irfan Khoosat. The new members included Danish Taimoor, Rashid Farooqi. Khawaja Saleem, Hamza Firdous, Ayaz Sammo and Irfan Motiwala.
