= Pakistan National Council of the Arts =

Pakistani government body to promote and develop arts

Pakistan National Council of the Arts پاکستان قومی انجمن فنون

Agency overview
- Type: Council responsible for promotion of culture, art, musics, film, and theatre
- Agency executive: Fouzia Saeed, Director General in 2021
- Website: Official Website

Footnotes
- National Heritage and Culture Division

Pakistan National Council of the Arts also known as PNCA (Urdu: پاکستان قومی انجمن برائے فنون) is a federal institute under the National Heritage and Culture Division, Government of Pakistan. It was established through an Act of Parliament in 1973 with the mandate to lead the development of arts in Pakistan. PNCA policies are framed by its Board of Governors which reports to the Federal Minister for National Heritage and Culture Division.

== Headquarters ==
It is based in Sector F-5/1, Islamabad, Pakistan.

== Divisions ==
The Council is structured into four major divisions:

=== Visual Arts ===
The Visual Arts Division (VAD) was established /set up in 1974 initially named as "Plastic Arts Division". The Division has two operational components, when initiated; The National Art Gallery (NAG) & Design Section (initially functioning in a residential facility and shifted to its permanent venue in 2007).

In July 2017, China's culture was showcased at the PNCA.

=== Performing Arts ===
Performing Arts Division of PNCA is mandated for the promotion and preservation of the Intangible Cultural Heritage. It is engaged in organizing different shows/ programmes representing provincial/ regional cultures/ heritage – (Dance, Music and Drama).

A National Music Festival was held to commemorate the 70th Independence Day of Pakistan in August 2017. The events were scheduled as follows:

- Day one – Performances by all classical singers from different parts of the country
- Day two – Performances by the Pakistani instrumentalists
- Day three – Performances by all the folk singers

=== Pictorial Exhibitions ===
To celebrate the culture and heritage of Pakistan, pictorial exhibitions are also held at the PNCA. These picture displays capture folk heritage, traditional architecture and just routine life in Pakistan. In October 2017, a photo exhibition from Colombia titled 'Amazing Amazon' was held at PNCA.

=== Children Art Workshop ===
Pakistan National Council of the Arts has a Children Art Workshop section. CAW organizes following colourful programmes round the year:

- Independence Day – 14 August
- Pakistan Day – 23 March
- Universal Children Day – 21 November
- Speech Competition Day
- Naat Competition Day
- Singing Competition Day
- Mehfil-Millad Day

=== National Puppet Theatre ===
National Puppet Theatre was established in 1975. It was a step taken by Pakistan National Council of the Arts, Ministry of Culture & Pakistan in order to revive the most popular folk art, which was dying due to negligence. Two groups were sent to China for Rod puppet training in 1975 and 1979 and a third was sent to Poland in 1987. Since then its quest to promote the art of puppetry, at home and in remote/ far flung areas of Pakistan, is in progress. NPT is carrying on its services to entertain/educate the children and norms through puppetry at home by conducting free puppet shows every Friday at Liaquat Memorial Hall, Rawalpindi in the past and is carrying on this at National Art Gallery, Islamabad with its eleven-member team. This team of National Puppet Theatre also holds shows every year to highlight important international events like Earthquake Victims Day, Kashmir Solidarity Day, Pakistan Day Celebrations, Independence Day Celebrations, World Tourism Day, and Universal Children Day & Quaid-e-Azam Day Celebrations.

== See also ==
- National Heritage and Culture Division
- National Art Gallery, Pakistan
- National Academy of Performing Arts
