= Alif Noon =

- DVD cover for Alif Noon
- Genre: Comedy
- Created by: Kamal Ahmed Rizvi
- Written by: Kamal Ahmed Rizvi
- Starring: Kamal Ahmed Rizvi; Rafi Khawar
- Country of origin: Pakistan
- Original language: Urdu
- No. of seasons: 1st (1965); 2nd (1982)

Production
- Production company: PTV Karachi

Original release
- Network: PTV
- Release: 1 June 1965 – 1982

Alif Noon (Urdu: الف نون) is a 1965 comedy television series from Pakistan Television, written by Kamal Ahmed Rizvi. The cast consisted of Rafi Khawar, known as Nanha, and Kamal Ahmed Rizvi known as Allan.

The sitcom spanned four distinct periods. The first run lasted from June 1, 1965, to November 30, 1965; it comprised 23 episodes and was titled "Alif aur Noon." These episodes were broadcast live. Large crowds would gather at hotels and public places to watch the show. The sitcom's popularity drove up the demand for television sets, prompting many companies to begin importing them. In 1968, VTR (Video Tape Recording) technology was introduced in the country. "Alif aur Noon" was aired a second time from March 15, 1968, to March 18, 1969. It was broadcast a third time in December 1971 under the title "Alif Noon," and a fourth time—also as "Alif Noon"—from April 28, 1981, through 1982.

== Plot ==
Each episode follows 'Allan' as a clever business-minded person, coming up with one immoral trick or another to earn fast money. He used to use 'Nanha' as his stooge. He himself was not inclined to work and would rather be the sleeping partner in every saga or tell the tricks to poor Nanha (his front man). The character of Nanha became an instant hit. He faced the new society and was therefore used by Allan as the 'front man' for his constantly failing get-rich-quick gimmicks. In the end, he would unintentionally toss out the whole plot of scheming Allan by speaking the truth to the public.

== Cast ==
Main

- Kamal Ahmed Rizvi as Allan
- Rafi Khawar as Nanha

Special Appearances

- Munawar Saeed as Teacher
- Uzma Gillani as Patient
- Qavi Khan as Journalist
- Madeeha Gauhar as police officer
- Samina Ahmad as Andaleeb
- Khalid Butt as Policeman
- Nighat Butt as Zareena's mother
- Sheeba Hassan as Sakeena
- Tamanna as Amma
- Mehboob Alam as Customer
- Jameel Fakhri as Chaudhary
- Durdana Butt as Mai
- Samina Khalid as Zareena
- Atiya Sharaf as Fazila
- Shamim Hilaly as College Student
- Qavi Khan as Munnan
- Tasneem Kausar as Poor lady

== Pakistani society ==
Although a 1960s comedy drama, the show portrayed the dark side of Pakistani society, where scams, frauds, and such are widespread. The series contained a positive message in each episode, though.

== Film industry ==
'In Film industry' episode, it is shown that inexperienced and materialistic type of people have come into the Pakistani film industry who just make 'dummy' films. This could be easily validated from the state of present film industry in Pakistan.
