= Mirat-ul-Uroos (1988 TV series) =

1988 Pakistani television drama series

- Title screen
- مراۃ العرُوس
- Genre: Family; Drama
- Written by: Professor Haq Nawaz
- Directed by: Shaukat Zain-ul-Abideen
- Starring: Irsa Ghazal; Arifa Siddiqui; Naima Khan
- Country of origin: Pakistan
- Original language: Urdu
- No. of seasons: 1
- No. of episodes: 5

Production
- Producer: Shaukat Zain-ul-Abideen

Original release
- Network: PTV
- Release: 1988 – 1988

Mirat-ul-Uroos (Urdu: مراۃ العرُوس, lit. 'The Bride's Mirror') is a 1988 Pakistani television drama series written by Professor Haq Nawaz, based on the Urdu novel Mirat-ul-Uroos by Nazir Ahmad Dehlvi. It was produced and directed by Shaukat Zain-ul-Abideen for PTV. The series is one of several Pakistani television adaptations of Dehlvi's novel, which was first published in 1869 and is considered a foundational work of Urdu prose fiction.

== Plot ==
The drama centres on two sisters, Akbari and Asghari. Akbari, the elder, was raised in privilege and receives a poor education; Asghari, the younger, is modest and well educated. Both sisters marry and face difficulties adjusting to their new homes, with their contrasting characters determining how they fare in their respective marriages.

== Cast ==
- Irsa Ghazal as Akbari
- Arifa Siddiqui as Asghari
- Naima Khan as Tamasha
- Tamanna as Naani
- Afshan Qureshi as Khala
- Tani Begum as Mama Azmat
- Salma Khan as Kifayat-un-Nisa
- Ismat Tahira as Saas
- Atiya Sharaf as Mother
- Javed Rizvi as Moulvi Muhammad Faazil
- Anjum Ayaz as Kamil
- Pervaiz Raza as Aqil
- Agha Sadiq Ali as Door Andesh
- Mudassar Hussain as Kher Andesh
- Farrukh Sultan as Maal Andesh
- Shabnam as Zulfan
- Jazba Sultan as Bi Amma
- Nousheen Taj as Mehmooda
- Zameer Fatmi as Ravi
- Pervaiz Bhatti as Bazaz
- Muneer Purana as Kunjra
- Sagar Hashmi as Halwai
- Hamid Mehmood as Hazari

== Production ==
The series is an adaptation of Mirat-ul-Uroos, a didactic Urdu novel by Nazir Ahmad Dehlvi first published in 1869. The novel follows two sisters of contrasting character and is regarded as one of the first novels in Urdu literature. The novel has been adapted for Pakistani television on several subsequent occasions, including a 2011 comedy series Akbari Asghari and a 2012 serial Mirat-ul-Uroos on Geo Entertainment.
