= Jo Bichar Gaye =

Pakistani television series

- Urdu: جو بچھڑ گئے
- Genre: Period drama
- Based on: Bichar Gaye by Col. Z.I.Farrukh
- Written by: Ali Moeen
- Screenplay by: Haissam Hussain; Mehreen Alam
- Directed by: Haissam Hussain
- Starring: Wahaj Ali; Maya Ali; Talha Chahour; Nadia Jamil; Adnan Jaffar; Sajid Shah
- Composer: Sibte Hassan
- Country of origin: Pakistan
- Original languages: Urdu; Bengali
- No. of seasons: 1
- No. of episodes: 14

Production
- Executive producer: Haissam Hussain
- Production location: Lahore
- Editors: Liaqat Baltee; Ghayoor Hussain
- Running time: 36 - 38 minutes
- Production company: H2 Films Productions

Original release
- Network: Geo Entertainment
- Release: 12 December 2021 – 13 March 2022

Jo Bichar Gaye (Urdu: جو بچھڑ گئے, lit. 'Those Who Got Separated') is a Pakistani historical drama television series based on the book "Bichar Gaye" by Col. Z. I. Farrukh. The series is directed and produced by Haissam Hussain under his banner H2 Films, Mehreen Alam as co-writer for screenplay and written by Ali Moeen. It features Wahaj Ali, Maya Ali and Talha Chahour in leading roles. Set in 1970 and 1971, Jo Bichar Gaye is based on the Bangladesh Liberation War, and the fall of Dhaka. It premiered on Geo Entertainment on 12 December 2021 and aired weekly. The show ended on 13 March 2022 with 14 episodes.

== Plot ==
The plot revolves around the political conflict between West Pakistan and East Pakistan (modern day Bangladesh) leading up to the 1971 India-Pakistan war, and deals with fictional events from 1970 to 1971.

== Cast ==
- Wahaj Ali as Rumi. A character based on Shafi Imam Rumi
- Maya Ali as Sonia Anwar
- Talha Chahour as Capt. Z.I. Farrukh
- Adnan Jaffar as Col A.Fakhruddin
- Nadia Jamil as Shabnam Anwar
- Sajid Shah as Anwarul Haq
- Fazal Hussain as Haroon Anwar
- Rana Majid as Capt. Salahuddin Baig
- Aurangzaib Mirza as Col Aurangzeb
- Ahmed Abbas as Capt. Kabeer Alam
- Umer Darr as Capt. Siddiqui
- Omar Cheema as Shil
- Shizza Khan as Koko Aftab
- Zaheer Taj as Maj. Ghayas ud Din
- Usman Zia as Professor Ajeet
- Fahad Hashmi as Union Leader
- Usama Rehan as Tameez ud Fin
- Shahrule Ali As Sheikh Mujibur Rahman
- Fahad Sokhta as Professor
- Shah Fahad as Politician
- Arsalan Dultana as Politician
- Major Omer Shabbir as Maj. Omer
- Ghulam Hussain as Mohammad Ruhul Amin
- Muneeb Qadir as Jawaharlal Nehru

== Episodes ==
Jo Bichar Gaye, episodes
| No. overall | No. in season | Title | Original release date |
|---|---|---|---|
| 1 | 1 | "The Oath" | 12 December 2021 |
Captain Farrukh reaches Dhaka after being posted there, and feels that the circumstances are not good, favoring some major disaster. He is introduced to Brig. A. Fakhruddin, and updates him about the conditions. In Dhaka University, Professor Ajeet addresses the students, telling them that they suffered a lot because of West Pakistan's unfairness, and now they want freedom. Sonia condemns it, and asks "what kind of freedom?". On invitation, Farrukh goes to an event of Dhaka University's dramatic club society, where he encounters Sonia.
| 2 | 2 | "The Last Toast" | 19 December 2021 |
Students from West Pakistan go to Professor Ajeet to save their lives when some Bengali students try to kill them. He does not help them, and instead talks about his ideology. The next day, Sonia goes to the police station with some West Pakistani students to register a missing persons complaint. There she encounters Farrukh, who asks her what he can do to help her; she says he should find the students. At night, Farrukh goes to the university, where he sees Maj. Ghayas ud Din involved in anti-government activities and informs about it to Brig. A. Fakhruddin. On the other hand, Rumi discovers Sonia's support for the government and he complains to his paternal aunt, Shabnam, however, she supports her daughter. Farrukh meets her and tells Sonia there is still no information regarding the missing students. She invites him to the new years party at her house.
| 3 | 3 | "Future Prime Minister of Pakistan" | 26 December 2021 |
| 4 | 4 | "Agartala Conspiracy" | 2 January 2022 |
| 5 | 5 | "Peaceful Protest" | 9 January 2022 |
| 6 | 6 | "Writ of the Government" | 16 January 2022 |
| 7 | 7 | "Dead Reckoning" | 23 January 2022 |
| 8 | 8 | "Ghazipur" | 30 January 2022 |
| 9 | 9 | "Dead Before Dawn" | 6 February 2022 |
| 10 | 10 | "Operation Searchlight" | 13 February 2022 |
| 11 | 11 | "Uncivil War" | 20 February 2022 |
| 12 | 12 | "The Last Prayer" | 27 February 2022 |
| 13 | 13 | "The War" | 6 March 2022 |
| 14 | 14 | "The Fall" | 13 March 2022 |

== Production ==
=== Casting and development ===
Wahaj revealed in an interview about his upcoming project with Maya. Talha Chahour, a theatre actor makes his television debut with this serial. The serial marks comeback of Nadia Jamil after her cancer recovery.

=== Filming ===
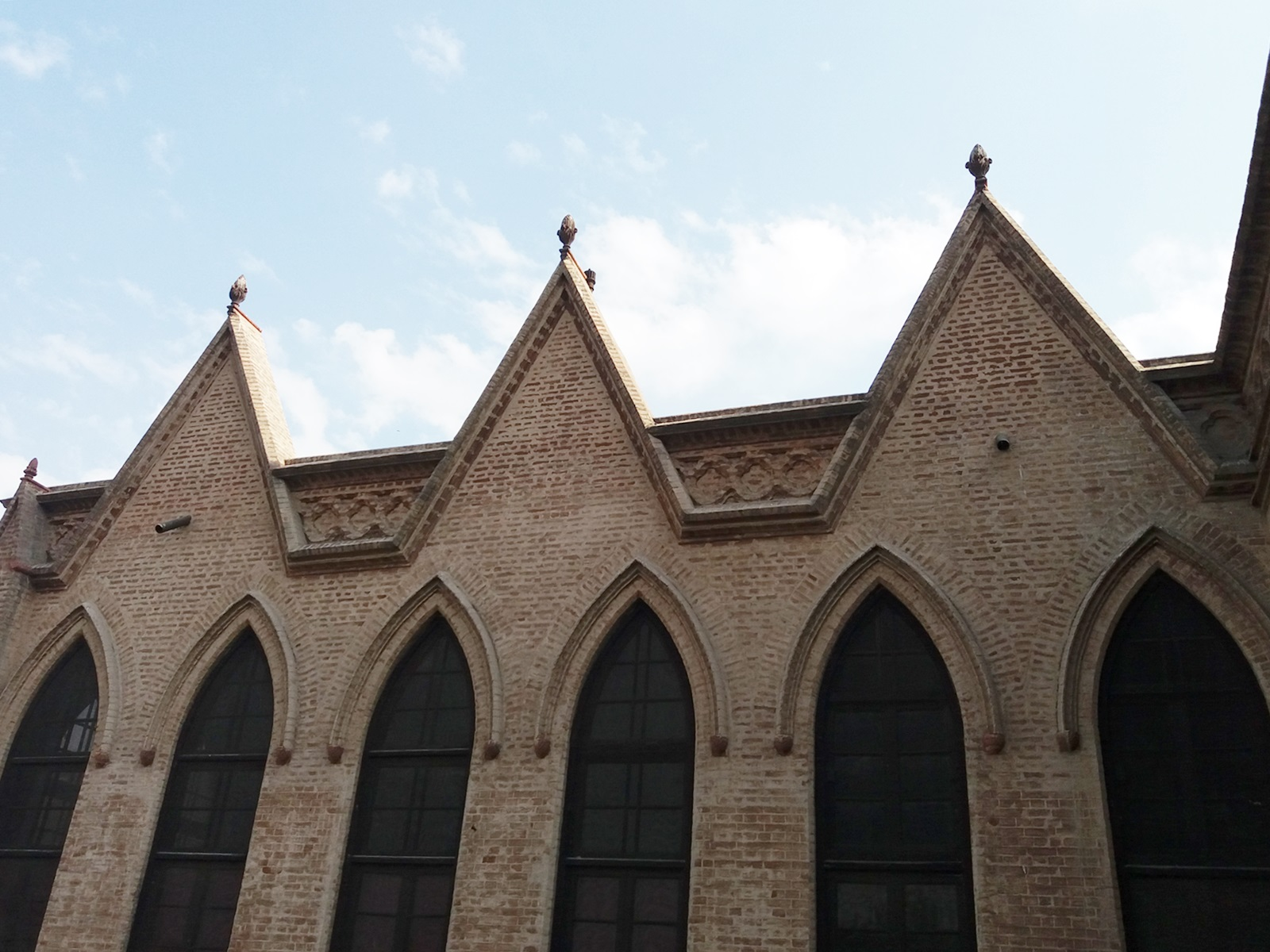
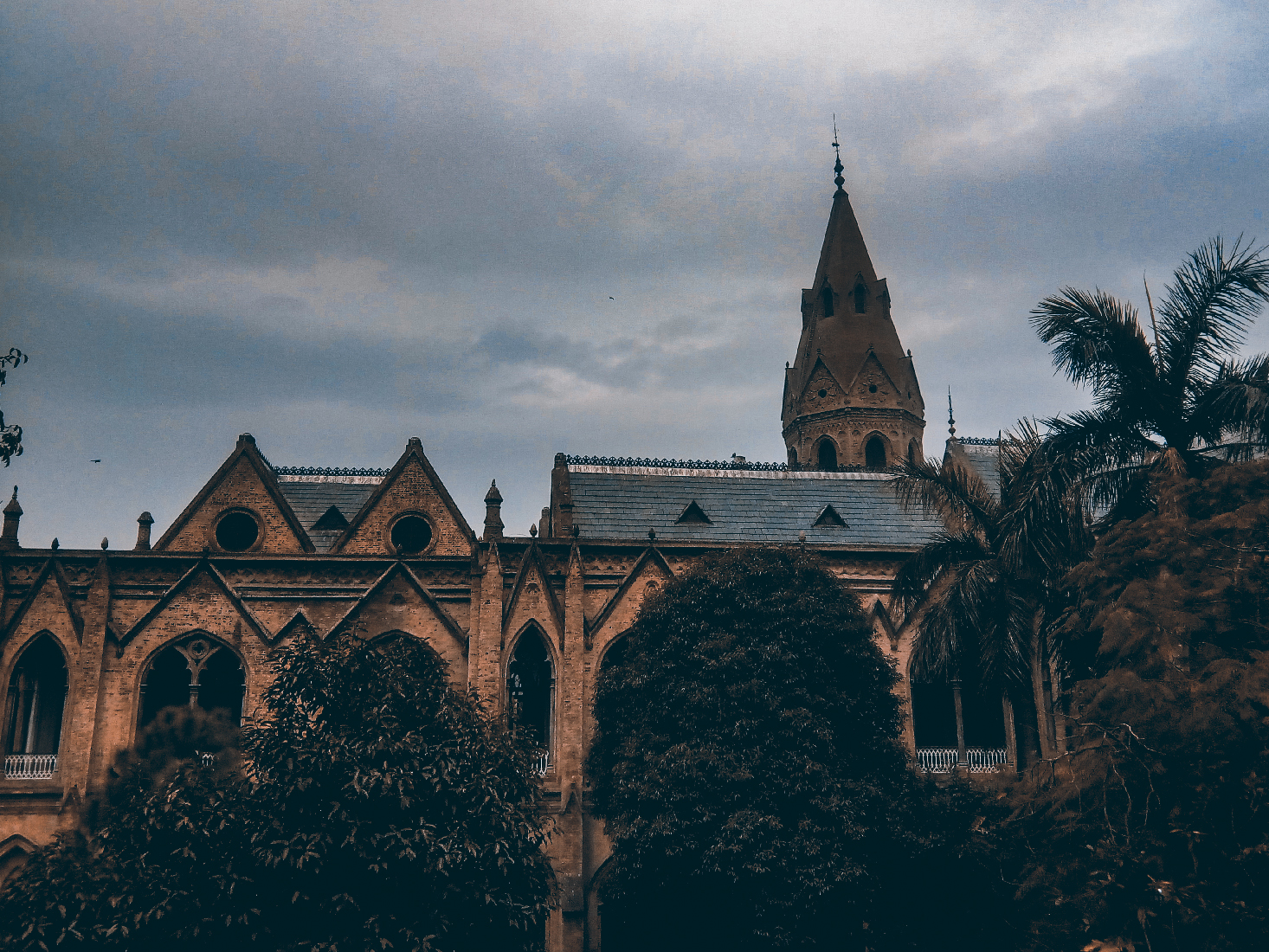
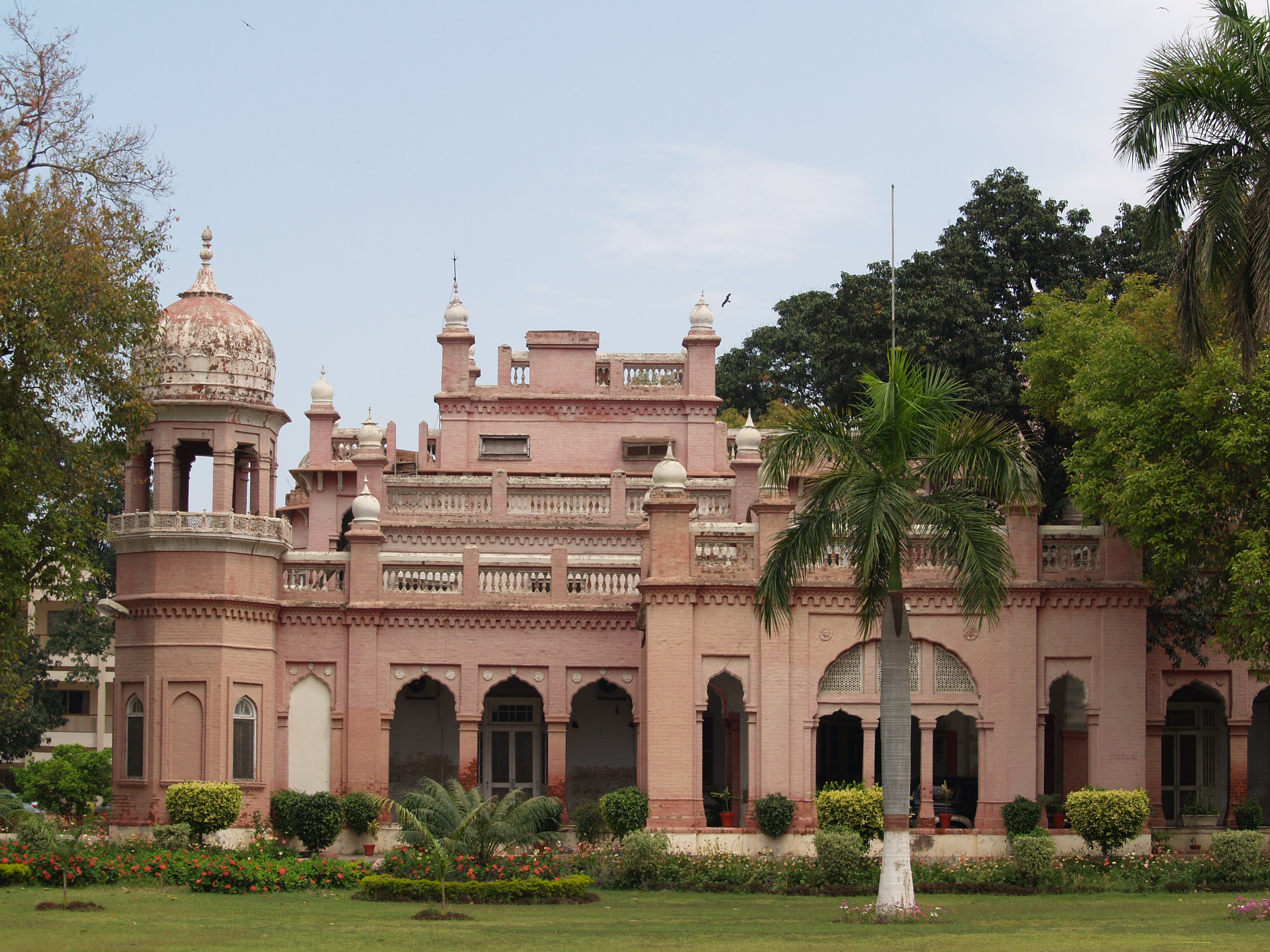
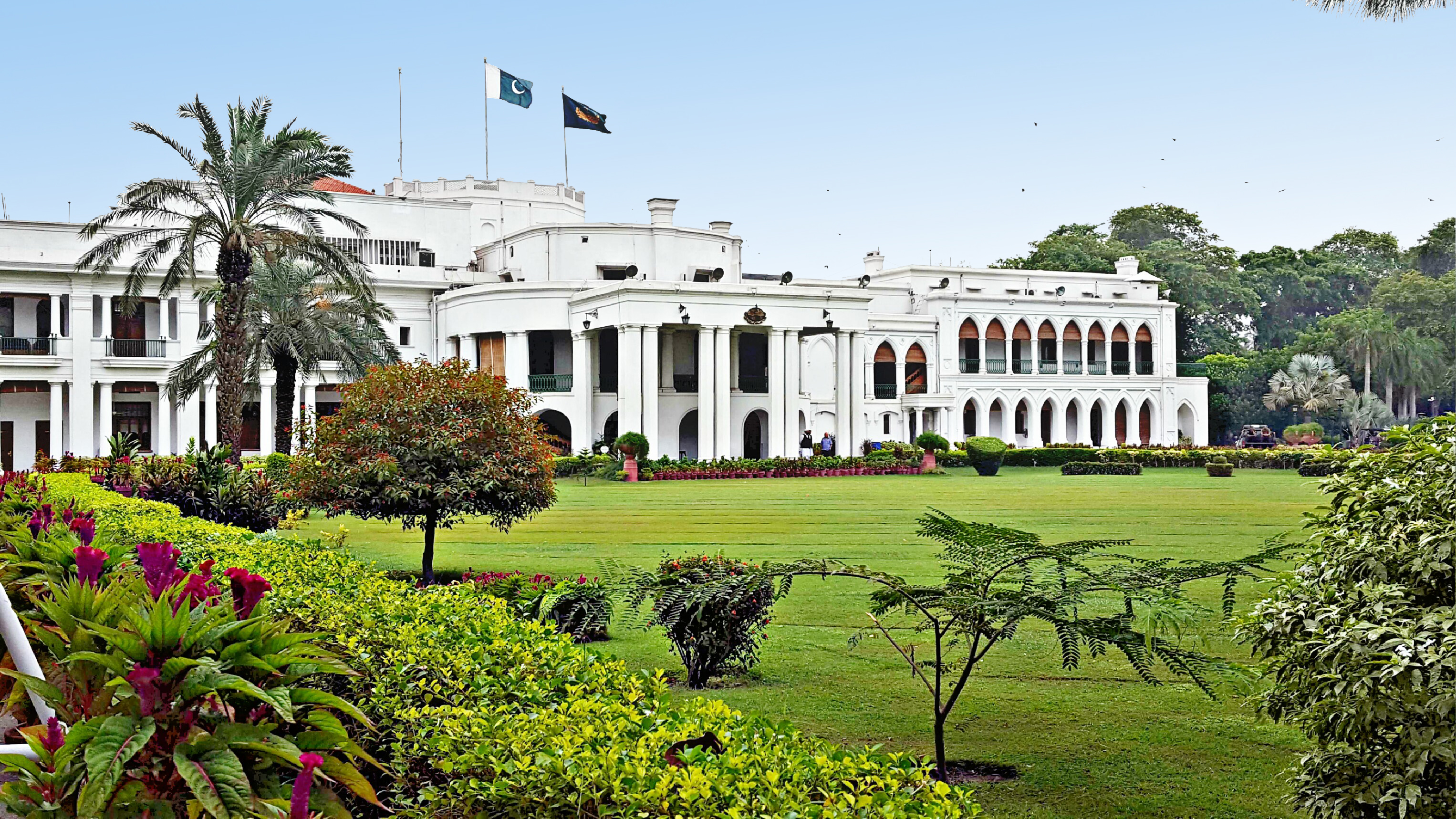
Shooting locations: Clockwise from upper left: Government College, Lahore (upper two), Governor's house and Chamba House

The shooting of the series took place within Lahore at several locations, mainly Government College University, Punjab University Old Campus, National College of Arts (NCA) and Chamba House, Lahore. A few scenes were filmed in Governor's House, Lahore too.

=== Release ===
The series was originally produced to be release on Green Entertainment, however due to the delayed launch of the network it could not happen and consequently the series aired on Geo Entertainment. The first and second teasers were released on 8 December 2021. The series premiered on 12 December 2021.

== Critical reception ==
The series received acclaim due to its execution and script.

In a review for Dawn, the reviewer praised its unbiased approach comparing it with Hussain's previous historical-period drama stating, "Like Haissam Hussain’s previous work Dastan, which centred on Partition, Jo Bichar Gaye does not indulge in triumphalist patriotism or demonisation." A review for The Express Tribune noted Wahaj Ali's performance as Rumi. Noor-Ul-Huda of The News International found it as a "well-executed drama" with a "nuanced storyline" and commended the casting, direction, and subject matter, its attention to detail in cinematography, costuming, and visual effects.

In a review published by The Daily Star, the reviewer panned the series for its distorted portrayal of the 1971 Liberation War, showing protesting Dhaka University students as "uncouth bullies" and Pakistani army men as "righteous gentlemen", and noted the inaccurate depiction of historical events and its use of derogatory language towards Bengalis.

Historian Anam Zakaria, writing for Dawn, argued that it distorts historical events, humanises Pakistani soldiers while depicting Bengalis as villains, and reinforces a narrative that absolves Pakistan of responsibility for the war.

== Awards ==
| Year | Ceremony | Categories | Recipient | Result | Ref. |
|---|---|---|---|---|---|
| 2022 | 21st Lux Style Awards | Best Emerging Talent in TV | Talha Chahour | Nominated | |

== Soundtrack ==
Jo Bichar Gaye

Soundtrack album by Sibte Hassan
- Released: 29 January 2022
- Recorded: 2021
- Length: 5:50
- Language: Urdu
- Label: Geo

All lyrics are written by Mubashir Hasan; all music is composed by Sibte Hassan.

| No. | Title | Singer | Length |
|---|---|---|---|
| 1. | "Raste Kathin" (Female version) | Beena Khan | 1:37 |
| 2. | "Raste Kathin" (Male version) | Sibte Hassan | 1:37 |
| 3. | "Tanhai" (co-written by Sibte Hassan) | Sibte Hassan | 2:46 |
| Total length: | | | 5:50 |

== See also ==
- Khaab Toot Jaatay Hain
