= Faiza Gillani =

Pakistani actress (born 1982)

- Born: 3 March 1982 (age 44); Karachi, Sindh, Pakistan
- Occupations: Actress; Model
- Years active: 1996 – present
- Children: 2
- Relatives: Irsa Ghazal (cousin); Ushna Shah (cousin); Shah Sharabeel (cousin)

Faiza Gillani is a Pakistani television, theatre and film actress known for her character roles. She made her on-screen debut in 1996, and her notable supporting roles were in the dramas Ullu Baraye Farokht Nahi, Sannata, Deewangi and Prem Gali. She made her cinematic debut with 2019 crime thriller Laal Kabootar.

== Career ==
Gillani made her acting debut in 1996 with Pakistan Television Corporation's Ranjish.

In 2023, she portrayed a salon owner, Babra, in Serial Killer. A reviewer from DAWN Images hailed her performance as "simply exceptional", and further opined that her "extraordinary range in bringing Babra to life is truly impressive."

== Filmography ==
=== Television series ===
Year	Title	Character	Network	Ref(s)
1996	Ranjish	Sharda	PTV	
2007	Tere Pehlu Mein	Fiza	Geo Entertainment	
2010	Madhosh	Naina	TV One	
2011	Main Chand Si	Abida	ARY Digital	
2011	Nail Polish	Ruba	A-Plus	
2012	Bhabhi Sambhal Chabi	Tehreen Begum	Urdu 1	
2012	Mithaas	Shireen	PTV	
2012	Ghaao	Rosie	Geo Entertainment	
2013	Kami Reh Gaee	Sana	PTV Network	
2013	Ullu Baraye Farokht Nahi	Sitara	Hum TV	
2013	Sannata	Neelam	ARY Digital	
2013	Jaan Hatheli Par	Faiza	Urdu 1	
2014	Uff Yeh Mohabbat	Samina	Geo Entertainment	
2014	Nazdikiyaan	Nadia	ARY Digital	
2015	Mohabbat Aag Si	Sharifa	Hum TV	
2015	Mujhe Kucch Kehna Hai	Azra	Geo Entertainment	
2016	Mera Yaar Miladay	Muneeza	ARY Digital	
2016	Ahsas	Di	Urdu 1	
2016	Jhoot	Fouzia	Hum TV	
2016	Sakeena	Sweetie	A-Plus	
2016	Izn-e-Rukhsat	Midhat	Geo Entertainment	
2016	Intezaar	Naila	A-Plus TV	
2017	Baji Irshad	Fariha	Express Entertainment	
2017	Zakham	Khalida	ARY Digital	
2017	Bachay Baray e Farokht	Shazia	Urdu 1	
2017	Pinjra	Shabana	A-Plus TV	
2018	Lamhay	Arfa	A-Plus TV	
2018	Meri Guriya	Mrs. Javed	ARY Digital	
2018	Badbakht	Kulsoom	ARY Zindagi	
2019	Khudparast	Sadia	ARY Digital	
2019	Meray Mohsin	Mrs. Zahid	Geo Entertainment	
2019	Deewangi	Nuzhat	Geo Entertainment	
2019	Makafaat Season 1	Durdana	Geo Entertainment	
2020	Tarap	Rabia	Hum TV	
2020	Bikhray Moti	Shaggo	ARY Digital	
2020	Prem Gali	Nargis	ARY Digital	
2021	Qayamat	Parween	Geo Entertainment	
2021	Pardes	Nabeela	ARY Digital	
2021	Makafaat Season 3	Azra	Geo Entertainment	
2022	Aitebaar	Fariha	Hum TV	
2022	Nisa	Rakshi	Geo Entertainment	
2022	Makafaat Season 4	Aiza	Geo Entertainment	
2022	Dikhawa Season 3	Fouzia	Geo Entertainment	
2023	Bojh	Faiza	Geo Entertainment	
2023	Meesni	Sahira	Hum TV	
2023	Farq	Yasmeen	Geo Entertainment	
2023	Mein Kahani Hun	Sadia	Express Entertainment	
2023	Jhok Sarkar	Zulekha	Hum TV	
2023	Jannat Se Aagay	Sirya	Geo Entertainment	
2023	Working Women	Hashmat	Green Entertainment	
2023	Mannat Murad	Nudrat	Geo Entertainment	
2023	Khushbo Mein Basay Khat	Sajida "Chajo"	Hum TV	
2023	Breaking News	Ayesha	Green Entertainment	
2024	Serial Killer	Barbara	Green Entertainment	
2024	Pagal Khana	Reema	Green Entertainment	
2024	Tere Mere Sapnay	Shama	Geo Entertainment	
2024	Dikhawa Season 5	Maleeha	Geo Entertainment	
2024	Meem Se Mohabbat	Saleeqa	Hum TV	
2025	Mann Marzi	Safeena	Geo Entertainment	
2025	Makafat Season 7	Nighat	Geo Entertainment	
2025	Haya	Riffat	Geo Entertainment	
2025	Case No 9	Judge	Geo Entertainment	
2025	Pamaal	Safia	Green Entertainment	

=== Film ===
Key
†	Denotes film/serial that has not yet been released

Year	Title	Role	Notes
2019	Laal Kabootar	Nasreen	film debut
2019	Beila	Beila	short film
2022	Dum Mastam	Aliya	

=== Web series ===
Year	Title	Role	Notes
2020	Churails	Bilquis	Episode 2, 9
2021	Qatil Haseenaon Ke Naam	Kanwal	
2022	Mrs. & Mr. Shameem	Rukhsana	
2024	Barzakh	Tasleem	Web series for ZEE5
