= Akbari Asghari =

Pakistani comedy drama television series

- Also known as: Aaja Sajna Miliye Jhuliye
- Genre: Romantic comedy
- Created by: Six sigma Presentation
- Written by: Faiza Iftikhar
- Directed by: Haissam Hussain
- Starring: Sanam Baloch; Humaima Malick; Imran Abbas; Fawad Khan
- Opening theme: by Athar Sani
- Country of origin: Pakistan
- Original languages: Urdu, Punjabi, English
- No. of seasons: 1
- No. of episodes: 25

Production
- Producer: Samina Humayun Saeed
- Production locations: Pakistan, Turkey
- Running time: 40-42 minutes

Original release
- Network: Hum TV
- Release: 28 May – 10 November 2011

Akbari Asghari is a 2011 Pakistani comedy-drama television series loosely based on Nazir Ahmad Dehlvi's Mirat-ul-Uroos. A modern-day comical adaptation of the novella, the series was written by Faiza Iftikhar and directed by Haissam Hussain. Sanam Baloch and Humaima Malik played the titular Akbari and Asghari respectively with Imran Abbas and Fawad Khan as the male leads.

== Plot ==
The story is of two sisters, Akbari and Asghari, who have spent their whole lives abroad. Now their cab driver father, Hatim, wants them to marry his nephews Akbar and Asghar. Akbari is a pretentious girl who wants to impress her parents but does whatever she wishes. On the other hand, Asghari is not a hypocrite, and she does everything publicly.

Akbari is interested in a Christian boy, Roger. When Hatim and Kulsoom ask the sisters to marry Akbar and Asghar, Asghari blatantly refuses, whereas Akbari agrees to be in the good books of her parents. When Hatim goes shopping for the marriage, Akbari plans to escape from the house. She leaves and goes to Roger's house, where she finds him with a girl. He tells her that the girl is his wife. Akbari is shocked. Kulsoom succeeds in finding her and brings her back.

After this incident Akbari agrees to marry Akbar. But in the village, Akbar does not agree to marry Akbari, as he wants a religious wife and thinks his cousins are ultra-modern.

Hatim and Kulsoom bring Akbari to Pakistan. When they see Akbar, they are worried because Akbar is very religious. When Akbar tells Asghar that he does not want to marry Akbari, Asghar says that instead of Akbar, he will marry Akbari. Asghar only wants to marry Akbari for money, as Hatim has told everyone in Pakistan that he owns much wealth.

Hatim and Kulsoom are pleased when Shaheen and Luqman tell them about Akbari and Asghar's marriage. Asghar's cousin and girlfriend, Shabbo, is angry with him. He lies to her that Akbari has promised to refuse to marry at the time of Nikkah. On the eve of dholki, Asghari had to come and attend the wedding. Luqman sends Akbar to bring Asghari from the station. Asghari comes home. On the wedding day, Asghari starts dancing with the dancer, which upsets the whole family. Shabbo becomes very upset.

After the marriage, Hatim has a heart attack, so his father tells him to take Akbar to America so that he can take care of Hatim and his business. Akbar goes there, and it is revealed to him that the family is poor, and they pretend that they are rich. In America, Akbar also slowly befriends Asghari but is upset when he sees her with her friend Raj, a Hindu Indian whom he mistakes for her boyfriend.

On returning to Pakistan, he tells his peer (religious figure) about the relationship between Asghari and Raj. Peer convinces him that to save Asghari from marrying a non-Muslim, he must marry her instead. Though slightly sceptical, Akbar later agrees.

On the other hand, Akbari is adjusting very badly in her new home. She is rude to her mother-in-law but convinces all the other family members that she is the victim and gains their sympathy. She also shows no interest in Asghar and ignores his advances. The furious Shabbo vows to revenge Asghar for betraying her and tries to take every opportunity possible to make it look like he is cheating on Akbari with her.

Akbari also convinces Asghari that she is being ill-treated in Pakistan, so she will convince her parents to force Asghar to divorce her. Asghari, who sees Shabbo and Asghar together, is convinced he is cheating on Akbari as well though Akbari remains oblivious to the matter. On receiving the proposal from Akbar, Asghari sees it as an opportunity to be closer to her sister and grant her justice and thus agrees, much to the surprise of her family.

Akbar and Asghari are married in Pakistan, but their demeanour towards each other remains somewhat cold, each prejudiced against the other. However, they soon grow to like each other though both refuse to acknowledge or show it. Meanwhile, Akbar's peer turns out to be a fraud, and despite the many hints he receives from people he knows, Akbar refuses to hear a word against him.

To show Akbar the truth, Asghari goes to the peer with a problem, and on seeing her beauty, he calls her to meet him at night. Meanwhile, Akbari discovers about Asghar and Shabbo, and despite her pretence that Asghar means nothing to her, she is deeply hurt. Asghar, too, is in a fix when Shabbo blackmails him into meeting her again and again, even though he has fallen for his wife. At last, when Shabbo calls him to meet her on the roof, Asghar is saved by his mother, who warns Shabbo to leave her son alone unless she wants the whole family to know about her true colours.

Asghar goes and apologizes to Akbari and confesses his love for her, and she too tells him she loves him and goes and thanks and apologizes to her mother-in-law. Akbar saves Asghari as the peer tries to harass her when she goes there alone at night. Akbar finally realizes the truth about the fraud and confesses to Asghari that he loves her, to which she admits she reciprocates.

== Cast ==
Main Cast
Actor	Role	Description
Sanam Baloch	Akbari a.k.a. Becky	The elder daughter of Hatim and Kim and wife of Asghar
Humaima Malik	Asghari a.k.a. Sarah	The younger daughter of Hatim and Kim and wife of Akbar
Imran Abbas	Akbar Choudhry	The elder son of Shaheen and Luqmaan and husband of Asghari
Fawad Khan	Asghar Choudhry	The younger son of Shaheen and Luqmaan and husband of Akbari
Asma Abbas	Kulsoom a.k.a. Kim	Mother of Akbari and Asghari. Wife of Hatim
Rehan Sheikh	Hatim Choudhry	Father of Akbari and Asghari, Husband of Kim
Nargis Rasheed	Shaheen	Mother of Akbar and Asghar, Wife of Luqmaan
Ashraf Khan	Luqmaan Choudhry	Father of Akbar and Asghar, Husband of Shaheen
Nasreen Qureshi	Kaneez Fathima a.k.a. Bay Ji	Sister of KFC
Humaira Ali	Batool	Sister of Hatim and Luqmaan, Mother of Shabbo from Sialkot
Ali Ejaz	Karim Fazal Choudhry a.k.a. KFC	The patriarch. Father of Hatim, Luqmaan and Batool.
Kiran Haq	Shabana a.k.a. Shabbo	Daughter of Batool; cousin of Akbari, Asghari, Akbar and Asghar
Nayyar Ejaz	Peer O Murshid	Fraud Peer of village and Murshid of Akbar Choudhry
Anita Campher	Sushmita a.k.a. Sush	Kim's friend
Musa Kaya	Roger	Akbari's Lover. Gets Break-up
Tipu Sharif	Raj Malhotra	Sush's son and friend of Saarah
Tulin Mutlu	Roger's wife	

== Production ==
According to Iftikhar, she was unsatisfied with the idealization of quiet, uneducated women and the villainization of educated, outspoken women in Nazir Ahmad Dehlvi's Mirat-ul-Uroos. She argued that Akbari's imperfections don't make her characterless, and advocates for equal rights and respect for women regardless of their abilities. It marked second collaboration of Sanam Baloch and Fawad Khan after Dastaan.

== Release ==
=== Broadcast ===
- Akbari Asghari originally aired on Hum TV from 28 May 2011 to 10 November 2011.
- The show reran on Hum TV's sister channel Hum Sitaray premiered on 14 January 2016.
- The show aired on Hum Europe from 8 May 2016.
- In 2020, the show aired on Hum TV under the segment "Hum Kahaniyan" from Monday to Friday at 9:00 am.
- It also aired in India on Zindagi from 22 June 2015, under the title Aaja Sajna Miliye Juliye to celebrate the channel's first anniversary.

=== Digital release ===
- In December 2022, it was made available for streaming on Hum TV's Official YouTube Channel.
