= Kami Reh Gaee =

Pakistani television series

- Genre: Drama; Romantic
- Written by: Kashif Nisar
- Directed by: Kashif Nisar
- Starring: Nauman Ejaz; Mehwish Hayat; Irsa Ghazal; Uzma Hassan; Saba Faisal; Seemi Raheel; Faiza Gillani
- Theme music composer: Sahir Ali Bagga
- Opening theme: "Kami Reh Gaee" by Waheed-ul-Hassan; Nandini Srikar
- Composer: Sahir Ali Bagga
- Country of origin: Pakistan
- Original language: Urdu
- No. of episodes: 22

Production
- Executive producer: Khawar Azhar
- Producer: Khawar Azhar
- Production locations: Karachi, Pakistan
- Cinematography: Rashid Abbas
- Editors: Zeeshan Aslam; Aman Ali Butt
- Camera setup: Multi-camera setup
- Running time: 40 minutes

Original release
- Network: PTV Network
- Release: 2013 – 2013

Kami Reh Gaee is a 2013 Pakistani drama serial directed and written by Kashif Nisar and produced by Khawar Azhar. It stars Nauman Ejaz, Mehwish Hayat and Irsa Ghazal in lead roles.

== Cast ==
- Nauman Ejaz as Waqar
- Mehwish Hayat as Laila
- Irsa Ghazal as Maham
- Jahanzeb Gurchani
- Agha Ali as Ali
- Uzma Hassan
- Saba Faisal
- Seemi Raheel
- Haseeb Khan
- Abdullah Ejaz
- Imran Rizvi
- Zahid Qureshi
- Faiza Gillani
- Anushey Asad

== Awards and nominations ==
=== 13th Lux Style Awards ===
- Best TV Actor Terrestrial-Nauman Ijaz
- Best TV Actress Terrestrial-Mehwish Hayat

==== Nominations ====
- Best TV Play

== See also ==
- List of PTV dramas
