= Mirat-ul-Uroos =

Urdu language novel by Nazir Ahmad Dehlvi

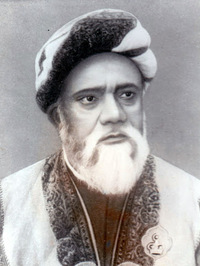
- Author: Nazir Ahmad Dehlvi
- Language: Urdu
- Genre: Novel
- Set in: Delhi
- Published: 1869

Mirat-ul-Uroos (Urdu: مراۃ العروس, The bride's mirror) is an Urdu language novel written by Indian author Nazir Ahmad Dehlvi, also popularly known as Deputy Nazir Ahmad, (1830–1912) and published in 1869. The novel contains themes promoting the cause of female education in Muslim and Indian society, and is credited for giving birth to an entire genre of fictional works promoting female literacy in Urdu, Hindi, Punjabi, Kashmiri and other languages of the Indian subcontinent. The book sold over 100,000 copies within a few years of its initial publishing.

== Plot ==
The story contrasts the lives of Akbari and Asghari, two Muslim sisters from Delhi. The first part of the book describes the life of Akbari, who is raised in privilege. She is depicted as lazy and poorly educated. When she moves to her husband's house after her marriage, she has a very difficult time and brings all manner of unhappiness upon herself by her poor judgment and behavior. The book's second part is centered on the younger sister Asghari, who is modest, hardworking and educated well in a school. She despises idle chatter and is the beloved of all in her society. When she is married, she too undergoes a difficult transition, but through her hard-work, winsome manners and good education is able to form solid bonds with her husband's family and the people of her new society. The story goes through a number of twists and turns that describe the experiences of the two women at various stages in their lives.

== Sequel ==
In 1873, "Banat-un-Nash" (بنات النعش, Daughters of the bier, which is also the Arabic name for the constellation Ursa Major) was published as a sequel to Mirat-ul-Uroos. It depicted Asghari running a girls' school in her neihbourhood.

== TV drama adaptations ==
Mirat-ul-Uroos was also adapted for television under the same name by PTV (Pakistan Television Corporation). The role of "Akbari" was played by Irsa Ghazal and "Asghari" was played by Arifa Siddiqui.

In 2011, this story was once again adapted into a comedy television drama, by the name of Akbari Asghari, which aired on Hum TV. The role of Akbari was played by Sanam Baloch and Asghari was played by Humaima Malik. Imran Abbas Naqvi and Fawad Khan played the male leads.

In 2013, the story of Akbari and Asghari continued with Mirat Ul Uroos, a Geo TV drama. This serial is about the granddaughters of Akbari, played by Aamina Sheikh and Mehwish Hayat, and the grandsons of Asghari, played by Mikaal Zulfiqar and Ahsan Khan.

== See also ==
- Deputy Nazir Ahmad Dehlvi
