= 13th Lux Style Awards =

Pakistani film awards ceremony

- Date: 4 December 2014
- Site: Mövenpick, Karachi
- Hosted by: Moomal Sheikh

The 13th Lux Style Awards was a 2014 event presented by Lux to honor the fashion, music, films and Pakistani television of 2013. Ceremony was held on 4 December 2014 in a private ceremony, for the first in the thirteen years of LUX, event wasn't televised.

== Winners and nominees ==
Following are the winners (in bold) and nominees for the 13th Lux Style Awards:

=== Film ===
| Best Film | Best Director |
|---|---|
| **Zinda Bhaag**; Main Hoon Shahid Afridi; Siyaah; Waar | **Meenu Gaur and Farjad Nabi – Zinda Bhaag**; Syed Ali Raza Usama – Main Hoon Shahid Afridi; Azfar Jafri – Siyaah; Bilal Lashari – Waar |
| Best Actor | Best Actress |
| **Khurram Patras – Zinda Bhaag**; Humayun Saeed – Main Hoon Shahid Afridi; Mohib Mirza – Seedlings; Gohar Rasheed – Seedlings; Shaan Shahid – Waar | **Aamina Sheikh – Seedlings**; Hareem Farooq – Siyaah; Mahnoor Usman – Siyaah; Aamina Sheikh – Josh; Amna Ilyas – Zinda Bhaag |

=== Television ===
| Best Television Serial - Satellite | Best Television Serial - Terrestrial |
|---|---|
| **Daagh (ARY Digital)**; Aun Zara (A Plus); Rehaai (Hum TV); Nanhi (Geo TV); Ullu Baraye Farokht Nahi (Hum TV) | **Mar Jayen Hum tu Kiya (ATV)**; Daag-e-Nadamat (PTV); Dil Awaiz (PTV); Kami Reh Gaee (PTV); Kuch Is Tarah (PTV) |
| Best Television Actor - Satellite | Best Television Actress - Satellite |
| **Fawad Khan – Zindagi Gulzar Hai (Hum TV)**; Fahad Mustafa – Daagh (ARY Digital); Fahad Mustafa – Kankar (Hum TV); Noman Ejaz – Rehaai (Hum TV); Noman Ejaz – Ullu Baraye Farokht Nahi (Hum TV) | **Sanam Saeed – Zindagi Gulzar Hai (Hum TV)**; Meher Bano – Daagh (ARY Digital); Sajal Ali – Nanhi (Geo TV); Samina Peerzada – Rehaai (Hum TV); Irsa Ghazal – Ullu Baraye Farokht Nahi (Hum TV) |
| Best Television Actor - Terrestrial | Best Television Actress - Terrestrial |
| **Noman Ejaz – Kami Reh Gaee (PTV)**; Faisal Rehman – Daag-e-Nadamat (PTV); Noman Ejaz – Dil Awaiz (PTV); Noor Hassan Rizvi – Kuch Is Tarha (PTV); Mohib Mirza – Roshni Andhera Roshni (ATV) | **Yamina Peerzada – Roshni Andhera Roshni (ATV)**; **Mehwish Hayat – Kami Reh Gaee (PTV)**; Mehreen Raheel – Daag-e-Nadamat (PTV); Sana Nawaz – Dil Awaiz (PTV); Aamina Sheikh – Kuch Is Tarha (PTV) |
| Best Television Director | Best Television Writer |
| **Haseeb Hassan — Nanhi (Geo TV)**; Haissam Hussain – Aun Zara (A Plus); Mehreen Jabbar – Rehaai (Hum TV); Kashif Nisar – Ullu Baraye Farokht Nahi (Hum TV); Sultana Siddiqui – Zindagi Gulzar Hai (Hum TV) | **Amna Mufti – Ullu Baraye Farokht Nahi (Hum TV)**; Moona Haseeb – Nanhi (Geo TV); Faiza Iftikhar – Aun Zara (A Plus); Farhat Ishtiaq – Rehaai (Hum TV); Umera Ahmad – Zindagi Gulzar Hai (Hum TV) |

=== Music ===
| Best Album | Best Music Video Director |
|---|---|
| **Yaraan Di toli – Rizwan Ali Jaffri**; Piyas – Jal; The Mushroom Cloud Effect – Adil Omar; Sargoshiyan – Saturn | **Yasir Jaswal – Bolay**; Adeel PK – Waris Shah; Adnan Khandar – Main Sufi Hun; Adnan Malik – My Punjabi Love for You; Yasir Jaswal – Akhri Bar Milo |
| Best Original Soundtrack | Best Song of the Year |
| **Humayun Saeed and Shahzad Nasib – Main Hoon Shahid Afridi**; Aaron Haroon Rashid – Burka Avenger (Geo Tez); Amir Munawar – Waar; Naureen Ali Sidiki – Mujhe Khuda Pe Yaqeen Hai (Hum TV); Mazhar Zaidi – Zinda Bhaag | **Malal – Rahat Fateh Ali Khan**; Bolay – Uair Jaswal; Har Zulm – Sajjad Ali; Jeet – Qayas; Khair Mangdi – Bilal Saeed |
| Best Emerging Talent in Music | |
| **Shehryar Mirza**; Bell; Disbelief; Fables of Cantt; Soch | |

=== Fashion ===
| Best Model of the Year - Female | Best Model of the Year - Male |
|---|---|
| **Cybil Chaudhry**; Amna Ilyas; Fouzia Aman; Nooray Bhatty; Rabia Butt | **Abbas Jafri**; Athar Amin; Jahan-e-Khalid; Rizwan Ali Jafri; Waleed Khalid |
| Best Fashion Photographer | Best Hair and Makeup Artist |
| **Rizwan-ul-Haq**; Abdullah Harris; Guddu Shani; Maram & Aabroo; Nadir and Maha | **Nabila Maqsood**; Maram & Aabroo; Nighat Misbah; Rana Khan |
| Best Achievement in Fashion Design - Luxury Prèt | Best Achievement in Fashion Design - Prèt |
| **Sania Maskatiya**; Ali Xeeshan; Elan; Sana Safinaz; Shela Chatoor | **Body Focus**; Khaadi; Sana Safinaz; Sania Maskatiya; Sublime |
| Best Achievement in Fashion Design - Lawn | Best Achievement in Fashion Design - Menswear |
| **Sania Maskatiya**; Elan; Fahad Hussayn; Sana Safinaz; Faraz Mannan | **Ahmad Bham**; Fahad Hussayn; Hassan Shehryar Yasin; Nauman Arfeen |
| Best High Street Brand | Best Emerging Talent in Fashion |
| **Khaadi**; Daaman; Gulabo; MK nation; Sana Safinaz | **Amna Babar - Female Model**; Azeem Sani - Fashion Photographer; Mahgul Rashid - Fashion Designer; Natasha and Saloon - Hair and Makeup Artist; Tabesh Oza - Male Model |

== See also ==
- 2nd Hum Awards
- 1st ARY Film Awards
