= Talha Chahour =

Pakistani actor (born 1997)

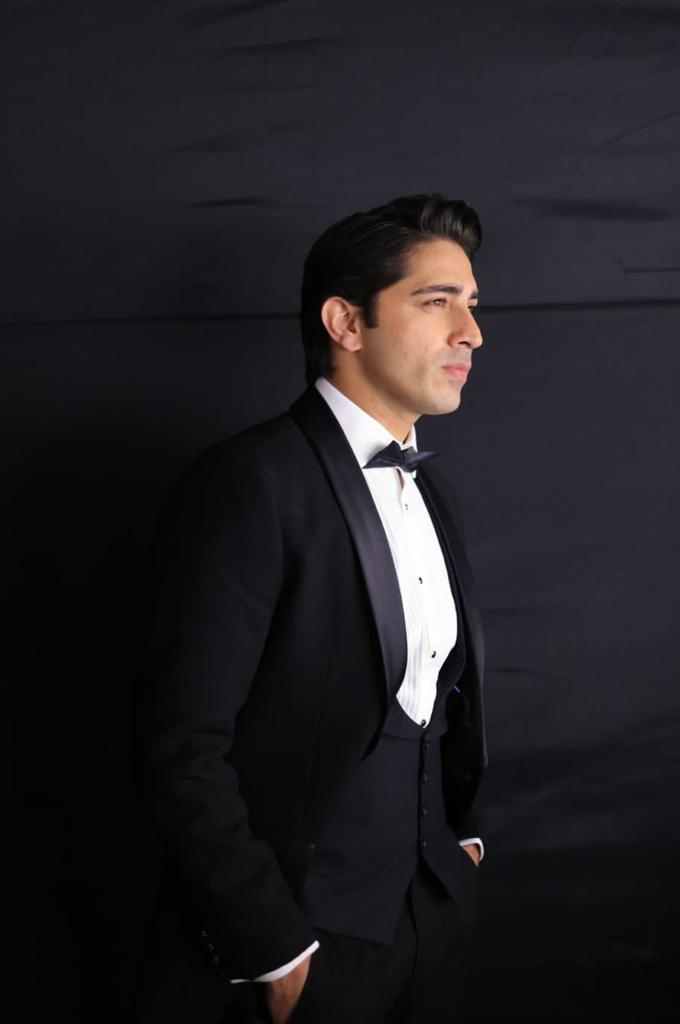
- Chahour at an event in 2023
- Born: 10 December 1997 (age 28); Rahim Yar Khan, Punjab, Pakistan
- Education: Government College University
- Occupation: Actor
- Years active: 2017–present

Talha Chahour is a Pakistani actor known for his work in theatre and television. He rose to prominence for his portrayal of Capt. Z. I. Farrukh in the political thriller Jo Bichar Gaye (2021–22), and received praise for the romantic drama Mannat Murad (2023–24). The former earned him a Lux Style Award for Best Emerging Talent in Television nomination.

== Early life and education ==
Talha Chahour was born and raised in Rahim Yar Khan, Punjab, Pakistan. He belongs to a Punjabi family and is the youngest of six siblings. His father, Akhtar Chahour, is a lawyer and a member of the Punjab Bar Council, currently serving as Chairman of the Human Rights Committee. Talha moved to Lahore when he was fifteen years of age to study at the Government College University, Lahore. He graduated in political science in 2018.

== Career ==
=== Theatre ===
After actively participating in the Dramatics Club of his college, Chahour began his career in theatre. He appeared in over 400 theatrical performances with the Ajoka Theater group. Some of his plays include Dara, Bullah, Lo Phir Basant Aayi, Tiger of Mysore, Anhi Mai Da Sufna, Macbeth and Bhagat Singh. Chahour also traveled with this theatre group to the United States and India, performing in several cities. Chahour became the General Secretary of GCDC (Government College Dramatics Club) in his last year of college, i.e. 2017–18. He conducted several acting workshops in GCU's amphitheater. He was awarded the Roll of Honour for serving in the GCDC. Chahour has won an Indian Academy Award in Theatre from the Ministry of Chandigarh. He also won a Naatshala Award from the Government of Amritsar, India.

=== Television ===
Chahour made his television debut in 2017 with Kashif Nisar's drama Farz where he played a supporting role.

His big breakthrough performance on television came with Har Pal Geo's political thriller drama Jo Bichar Gaye (2021-22), directed by Haissam Hussain, co starring Maya Ali and Wahaj Ali, which was about the fall of Dhaka. Chahour played the protagonist, Capt. Z. I. Farrukh, on whose memoirs the series was based. Chahour earned critical appreciation along with a nomination for Best Emerging Talent in Television at the 21st Lux Style Awards for his performance in this drama.

Chahour starred in Hum TV's Wabaal (2022), playing Faraz opposite Sarah Khan. He then appeared on Geo's Jannat Se Aagay as Farooq Ahmed alongside Kubra Khan, Ramsha Khan and Gohar Rasheed. Chahour next starred in Geo's Mannat Murad (2023-24) opposite Iqra Aziz where the two played the titular roles respectively.

In 2025, Chahour starred in ARY Digital's Eid special comedy telefilm Aik Shakki Love Story as Kabir Sikander opposite Sabeena Farooq. He also appeared as Qais Rafiq in Hum TV's drama Jama Taqseem alongside Mawra Hocane. He is starring in the new drama of Hum TV titled Neeli Kothi opposite Anmol Baloch.

== Personal life ==
Chahour's relationship status is single. In January 2025, he lost his mother.

== Filmography ==
=== Television dramas ===
Year	Title	Role	Network	Ref
2017	Farz	Imran	PTV Home	
2021	Jo Bichar Gaye	Capt. Z. I. Farrukh	Geo Entertainment	
2022	Wabaal	Faraz	Hum TV	
2023	Jannat Se Aagay	Farooq Ahmed	Geo Entertainment	
2023	Mannat Murad	Chaudhary Murad Hashmat Ali	Geo Entertainment	
2025	Jama Taqseem	Qais Rafiq	Hum TV	
2025	Neeli Kothi	Zaid Ali	Hum TV	
2026	Rutba	Hadi	ARY Digital	

=== Telefilms ===
Year	Title	Role	Director	Network
2025	Aik Shakki Love Story	Kabir Sikander	Badar Mehmood	ARY Digital

=== Films ===
Year	Title	Role	Notes	Ref.
2019	The Last Follower and the Resurrection of Voldemort	Edward	Student short film	

=== Music videos ===
Year	Title	Artist	Notes	Ref.
2025	Inna Akhiyan	Hadiqa Kiani		

== Awards and nominations ==
Year	Awards	Category	Work	Result	Ref.
2022	Lux Style Awards	Best Emerging Talent in Television	Jo Bichar Gaye	Nominated	
