= Nargis Rasheed =

Pakistani actress

- Born: 1 May 1967 (age 58); Rawalakot, Azad Kashmir, Pakistan
- Occupations: Actress, model
- Years active: 2000–present

Nargis Rasheed is a Pakistani actress who predominantly works in Urdu television serials and films. Her acting credits include Mere Harjai, Bad Gumaan, Ullu Baraye Farokht Nahi, Talkhiyaan, Muhabbat Ab Nahi Hugi, Aik Pal, Jhoot, Akbari Asghari, Alif Allah Aur Insaan, Tajdeed e Wafa, Kiran, Jo Tu Chahey and Ready Steady No.

== Filmography ==
=== Film ===
- Ready Steady No (2019)

=== Television ===
Year	Title	Role	Network
	Kache Pakke Ramg		PTV Home
2000	Junoon		PTV Home
2000	Sanam Khana		PTV Home
2013	Akbari Asghari	Shaheen	Hum TV
2011	Mere Harjai	Rohan	Geo TV
2013	Sannata	Naseeban	ARY Digital
2014	Ullu Baraye Farokht Nahi	Batool	ARY Digital
2015	Talkhiyaan	Aai	Hum TV
2015	Muhabbat Ab Nahi Hugi	Fiza's Mother	Hum TV
2015	Kaise Huaye Benaam	Paras's sister	Geo Entertainment
2015	Aik Pal	Noor Fatima's aunt	ARY Digital
2016	Bad Gumaan	Shaista	Hum TV
2016	Jhoot	Ghazala (Jamal's mother)	Hum TV
2016	Tumhari Marium	Mariam's mother	Hum TV
2016	Kiran		Geo TV
2017	Alif Allah Aur Insaan	Rani's mother	Hum TV
2018	Glass Tora Bara Aana		Hum TV
2018	Tajdeed e Wafa		Hum TV
2018	Chakkar	Nargis	BOL Entertainment
2019	Jo Tu Chahey	Shama	Hum TV
2021-22	Parizaad	Amna	Hum TV
