= Uzma Hassan =

Pakistani actress

- Born: 15 June 1980 (age 46); Lahore, Punjab, Pakistan
- Education: National Academy of Performing Arts
- Occupations: Actress; Model
- Years active: 2005 – present

Uzma Hassan is a Pakistani actress. She is known for her roles in dramas including Mohabbat Aag Si, Aangan, Prem Gali, Sang-e-Mar Mar, Pehli Si Muhabbat and Mannat Murad. She made her film debut with the romantic-drama film Arth (2018) for which she received critical acclaim and a nomination for Best Actress at Lux Style Awards.

== Filmography ==
=== Television series ===
Year	Title	Role	Network	Notes
2005	Inspector Khojee	Huma	PTV	
2011	Aao Kahani Buntay Hain	Tabinda	PTV	
2011	Shashlik Xtra Hot	Anna	Geo TV	
2012	Wilyti Desi	Maham	PTV	
2012	Kyun Ke Jeena Hai Jhoom Ke	Noor	PTV	
2012	Chalo Phir Se Jee Kar Dekhain	Faiza	PTV	
2012	Mere Huzoor	Zareen	Express Entertainment	
2012	Mr: Mom	Sara	Express Entertainment	
2013	Kami Reh Gaee	Asma	PTV	
2013	Ghundi	Rukhsana	Hum Sitaray	
2014	Ullu Baraye Farokht Nahi	Sajida	Hum TV	
2014	Apni Kahani Kesay Kahein	Yasmeen	Express Entertainment	
2014	Bay Emaan Mohabbat	Sobia	ARY Digital	
2014	Tum Mere Hi Rehna	Amber	Hum TV	
2015	Ek Sitam Aur Sahi	Zareen	Express Entertainment	
2015	Mohabbat Aag Si	Samiya	Hum TV	
2016	Main Kamli	Kulsoom	Aaj Entertainment	
2016	Kitni Girhain Baaki Hain 2	Nadia	Hum TV	Episode 31
2016	Dil Lagi	Sabiha	ARY Digital	
2016	Mannat	Gulnaz	Geo TV	
2016	Sang-e-Mar Mar	Shehrbano	Hum TV	
2017	No Time For Pyar Vyar	Maryam	PTV	
2017	Aangan	Rubina	ARY Digital	
2018	Ustani Jee	Soniya	Hum TV	Episode 4
2018	Kabhi Band Kabhi Baja	Madiha	Express Entertainment	Episode 4
2020	Prem Gali	Musarrat	ARY Digital	
2021	Pehli Si Muhabbat	Zainab	ARY Digital	
2021	Ishq-E-Laa	Kanwal Sultan	Hum TV	
2023	Mannat Murad	Sabiha	Geo Entertainment	
2024	Khaie	Gul Wareen	Geo TV	
2024	Dil-e-Nadan	Nighat	Geo Entertainment	
2025	Meri Tanhai	DD	Hum TV	
2025	Mann Mast Malang	Asma	Geo Entertainment	
2025	Dil Wali Gali Mein	Tamkenat	Hum TV	
2026	Mitti De Baway	Kausar	Green Entertainment	
2026	Hurmat	Hurmat's mother	Hum TV	

=== Web series ===
Year	Title	Role	Network
2022	Mrs. & Mr. Shameem	Humaira	ZEE5

=== Telefilm ===
Year	Title	Role
2019	Kausar Kahan Gae	Zubi

=== Film ===
Year	Title	Role	Notes
2005	Red Doors	Dance class student	English
2017	Arth - The Destination	Uzma	
2020	Kalasha- A Journey of Hope	Pari	

=== Other appearance ===
Year	Title	Role	Network
2018	Mazaaq Raat	Herself	Dunya News
2019	Say It All with Iffat Omer	Herself	YouTube
2024	Gup Shab With Vasay Chaudhry	Herself	Samaa TV

== Awards and nominations ==
Year	Award	Category	Result	Title	Ref.
2017	5th Hum Awards	Best Actress in a Negative Role	Nominated	Sang-e-Mar Mar	
2018	17th Lux Style Awards	Best Actress	Nominated	Arth - The Destination	
2018	4th Galaxy Lollywood Awards	Best Actress in a Leading Role	Nominated	Arth - The Destination	
2018	4th Galaxy Lollywood Awards	Best Actress Debut	Nominated	Arth - The Destination	
2018	4th Galaxy Lollywood Awards	Cinematic Moment of the Year	Nominated	Arth - The Destination	
