= Anjum Ayaz =

Pakistani sculptor

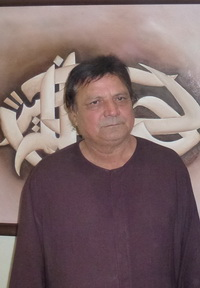
Anjum Ayaz

Anjum Ayaz (born 1949 in Amroha, India) is a Pakistani sculptor, theatre director, and painter. His work is made up of stone and mixed materials for specific large size sculptures for public, beaches and gardens. His work has been exhibited in Montreal, Paris, Marseille, Tokyo, Dubai, New York, Beijing, Holand, Germany, Singapore, Sydney and regularly in Pakistan for the past 30 years. He has also participated in 25 groups and solo sculpture shows.

== Early education ==
He started his education from National College of Arts 1965–1967, then moved to Karachi and joined Karachi School of Art and graduated in Fine Arts in 1970. He worked as an artist and designer for Pakistan Tourism Development Corporation from 1971–1978.

== Career ==
He started acting in various plays in Lahore for Pakistan Television (PTV) such as "Aladin ka chirag", the famous "Merat ul Uroos" and many more private productions as well. He also adapted and directed Sadaat Hussain Manto’s best short stories in classic drama for Geo Television, "Badshahat ka Khatma" and "Mohammad Bhai".

He currently works for the National Academy of Performing Arts as faculty member of theatre art department. He acted for NAPA faculty theatre production "Habib Mamoo" directed by Zia Mohiuddin. Directed four theatre plays for NAPA repertory theatre group "Wakeel Sahab", "Kanjoos", "Dil ka kia rang karon" and "Begum Jaan".

== Awards ==
- Acknowledgement of Art performance by Parliament of New South Wales, Australia.
- President's award for Pride of Performance, Pakistan.
