= Pakistan's Got Talent =

Pakistani reality television talent competition

- Genre: Reality talent competition
- Based on: Got Talent by Simon Cowell
- Judges: Ali Zafar; Mehwish Hayat; Tabish Hashmi; Usman Bashir
- Country of origin: Pakistan

Production
- Production company: Pixel Entertainment

Original release
- Network: Geo Entertainment
- Release: 18 July 2026

Related
- Got Talent

Pakistan's Got Talent is a Pakistani reality television talent competition based on the international Got Talent franchise created by Simon Cowell and owned by Fremantle. Produced by Pixel Entertainment, the programme is scheduled to premiere on Geo Entertainment on 18 July 2026. The first season will be judged by Ali Zafar, Mehwish Hayat, Tabish Hashmi and Usman Bashir.

The programme was announced in August 2025 after Pixel Entertainment signed an agreement with Fremantle to bring the format to Pakistan. Auditions opened in February 2026 for performers from across Pakistan, including singers, dancers, magicians, comedians, acrobats and beatboxers.

== Background ==
The Got Talent format was created by Simon Cowell and is owned by Fremantle. Before the announcement of a Pakistani edition, the format had aired in more than 70 countries. In August 2025, Pixel Entertainment announced that it had signed a deal with Fremantle to launch the franchise in Pakistan.

Rizwan Siddiqui, chief executive officer and co-founder of Pixel Entertainment, stated that the Pakistani version was intended to provide a platform for performers from cities, towns and villages across the country. The programme is open to a range of performers, including singers, dancers, magicians, comedians, acrobats and beatboxers.

== Production ==
In March 2026, Geo Television Network and Pixel Entertainment launched the programme in Pakistan, alongside a promotional campaign on the network. Auditions were conducted through the programme's official audition website.

=== Judges ===
In June 2026, Ali Zafar, Mehwish Hayat and Tabish Hashmi were announced as judges for the first season.

== Auditions ==
Auditions for Pakistan's Got Talent opened in February 2026, following an announcement by Pixel Entertainment. Applicants were required to provide details of their act, a performance video and an introductory video.

The audition form accepted a range of performance categories, including singing, comedy, magic, dance, acrobatics, martial arts, music and stunts, with an additional option for other acts. Applicants were required to be Pakistani residents and to provide a valid national identity card or passport. Animal acts required proof that the animals were healthy and vaccinated, while pyrotechnics and explosives were not permitted.

== See also ==
- Pakistan Idol
- MasterChef Pakistan
- Shark Tank Pakistan
