= Kalia (film) =

1984 film

(کالیا) Kalia (1984 film)
- Directed by: Waheed Dar; Mohammad Arif
- Written by: Syed Noor
- Produced by: Faqooq Malik; Aslam Butt
- Starring: Sultan Rahi; Mumtaz; Tani Begum; Mustafa Qureshi; Nazli; Iqbal Hassan; Afzaal Ahmed; Ilyas Kashmiri; Sawan; Tani Begum; Adeeb; Talat Siddiqui
- Narrated by: Dr. Majdia Farooq
- Cinematography: Masood Butt
- Edited by: Shaukat Ali
- Music by: Wajahat Attre; Lyrics; Ahmad Rahi; Waris Ludhianvi; Khawaja Pervez
- Distributed by: Ann Datta Production
- Release date: 6 April 1984
- Running time: 162 minutes
- Country: Pakistan
- Language: Punjabi

Kalia (Punjabi) is a 1984 Pakistani action drama and musical film directed by Waheed Dar and produced by Faqooq Malik. The film stars actor Sultan Rahi, Mumtaz, Mustafa Qureshi, and Iqbal Hassan.

== Inspiration ==
The film is dedicated to the dutiful jawans of the law enforcement agencies of Pakistan.

== Plot ==
Kalia was son of a poor family who rebelled against opposition under tyrannical Chaudhry Balandbakht and his mother, Jamal was honest cop who falls for Kalia's sister.

== Cast ==
- Sultan Rahi as Kalia
- Mumtaz as Chanda
- Mustafa Qureshi as Jamal
- Nazli as Jamal's love interest
- Iqbal Hassan as Akoo
- Afzaal Ahmad as DSP
- Ilyas Kashmiri as Chaudhry Balandbakht
- Talat Siddiqui as mother of Kalia
- Sawan as Dara daku
- Tani Begum as Begum
- Talish (Guests actor appearance)
- Adeeb as heera daku
- Jaggi Malik
- Altaf Khan
- Zahir Shah
- Seema

== Soundtrack ==
The music of Kalia is composed by Wajahat Attre with lyrics penned by Waris Ludhianvi and Khawaja Pervez and singers are Noor Jehan and Naheed Akhtar.

Kalia

Soundtrack album by Wajahat Attray
- Released: 6 April 1984
- Recorded: Shabab Brothers
- Genre: Film soundtrack
- Length: 27:30
- Language: Punjabi
- Label: EMI Musical
- Director: Hassan Askari
- Producer: Muhammad Younis
- Compiler: Khawaja Pervez

Wajahat Attray chronology
Dara Baloch (1984)	Kalia (1984)	Khuddar (1985)

=== Track listing ===
No.	Title	Artist(s)	Length
1.	"Challa Nee Challa Haaye Challa, Gori Cheechi Nuun Ghutda"	Noor Jehan & Naheed Akhtar	5:00
2.	"Gore Peiraan Wich Aa Gaya"	Noor Jehan	5:07
3.	"Phool Phool Kali Kali Karey Intezar"	Noor Jehan	5:59
4.	"Yaraa Lang Gai Teray Pyar Di Gali"	Noor Jehan	5:51
5.	"Jeenan Pyar Na Kisay De Nal Paya"	Noor Jehan	5:35
