= Kabhi Kabhi (2013 TV series) =

- Genre: Drama romance
- Written by: Samira Fazal
- Directed by: Anjum Shahzad
- Starring: Ahsan Khan; Mehwish Hayat (For entire cast see the section on cast below)
- Opening theme: Kabhi Kabhi Wafa Mili by Alycia Dias
- Country of origin: Pakistan
- Original language: Urdu
- No. of seasons: 1
- No. of episodes: 28

Production
- Producer: Idream Entertainment
- Production locations: Karachi, Pakistan
- Running time: 35-42 Minutes
- Production company: ARY Digital

Original release
- Network: ARY Digital
- Release: 20 September 2013

Kabhi Kabhi was a 2013 Pakistani drama serial penned by Samira Fazal, directed by Anjum Shehzad and broadcast on ARY Digital in 2013. It was also broadcast in India on Zindagi from 23 June 2015.

== Cast ==
- Ahsan Khan as Aarez
- Mehwish Hayat as Eeshal
- Javed Sheikh (the father of Eeshal and Eva)
- Bushra Ansari Aarez's mother
- Faris Shafi as Sunny
- Nausheen Shah as Eva (Eeshal's sister)
- Alyy Khan as Rehbar (Eva's husband)
- Sana Askari as Soni (Aarez's sister)

== Story ==
Kabhi Kabhi has been directed by Anjum Shehzad and has been written by Samira Fazal. ‘Kabhi Kabhi’ is a love story that revolves around Ariz and Ishal. Ariz belongs to a lower-middle-class background, a family of limited means and is also the sole breadwinner of the family. Ishal, on the other hand, comes from an upper-class family. She is studying abroad and wishes to escape the mechanical life that her father has provided her. Ishal's filthy rich father wants his daughter to marry Shahraiz as he has all the qualities that he wants in a son-in-law, he is rich, educated and very spoilt. Ishal also has a dominating brother-in-law, Rehbar, who wants her to marry Shahraiz. Though Ishal and Ariz marry despite everyone's disapproval, they have many troubles in their life because of Ariz's wicked mother and sister. Plus, Ishal's father keeps creating trouble in their life because he wants to get his daughter out of the middle-class house. The story is based on the struggles of their love life because of their difference in status in society.
