= Mannat Murad =

Pakistani television series

- Urdu: منّت مراد
- Genre: Drama; Romance
- Written by: Nadia Akhter
- Directed by: Syed Wajahat Hussain
- Starring: Iqra Aziz; Talha Chahour
- Opening theme: "Dil Haara" by Asim Azhar
- Country of origin: Pakistan
- Original languages: Urdu; Punjabi
- No. of seasons: 1
- No. of episodes: 33

Production
- Producers: Abdullah Kadwani; Asad Qureshi
- Running time: Approx. 36-45 Minutes
- Production company: 7th Sky Entertainment

Original release
- Network: Geo Entertainment
- Release: 26 September 2023 – 16 January 2024

Mannat Murad (Urdu: منّت مراد, lit. 'Wish and desire') is a Pakistani television series directed by Syed Wajahat Hussain. It stars Iqra Aziz and Talha Chahour in the titular roles. The supporting cast includes Irsa Ghazal, Noor ul Hassan, Rabya Kulsoom and Uzma Hassan.

== Plot ==
Chaudhary Murad Hashmat Ali is the only brother of four sisters Fazeelat, Nudrat, Itrat, Nighat and the apple of his mother Razia's eye. Murad's mother is a widow and he has two unmarried sisters Fazeelat and Nighat in the house - he financially supports all three as well as his married sister Nudrat whose husband does not work and gambles away what little they have. He supports his eldest sister Fazeelat emotionally as well, who has depression after Razia refused to allow her to marry Qadir, a man of her choice, many years ago. Now, the man Fazeelat was arranged to marry also refused to marry her. Razia struggles to find a rishta for her, due to her increasing age and Fazeelat faces many taunts which causes her depression and breakdowns.

Mannat is an independent and intelligent woman with three older brothers Nafees, Adil, Saad and a sister in law Sabiha who dote on her. Although she is given everything she wants to build a career and be independent so she starts a job in an office.

Murad sees Mannat in the office building – both work for separate companies but share a building. He falls in love at first sight but Mannat does not notice him.

Mannat and Murad meet through an arranged marriage setup but things don't work out because their families end up bickering and quarreling during the meeting.

Eventually, they meet again at work and fall in love while getting to know each other. However, having a love marriage is out of the question for both of them. Razia wants him to marry a girl that she chooses because she thinks that she will have more control over her daughter in law. Mannat's eldest brother Nafees is also very possessive of her and wants to hand pick her husband.

Without revealing that they are already in a relationship, they trick their families into arranging their marriage in spite of the differences between their class and mindset.

During the marriage ceremonies the class and mindset differences are highlighted when Razia demand gold as gifts for herself and her daughters and also returns Mannat's dowry furniture claiming that it was not enough. Mannat seeing Sabiha scrambling to meet their demands wonders if she made the right choice.

Once married, although they have a strong bond, conflict begins to arise between the couple because of Murad's controlling mother and sisters. Murad's family expects him to run around for them as he always has done - even on his wedding night when his gambler brother in law Shoukat is arrested. His sister also taunts him that he cares more for Mannat than his own family making him feel conflicted.

Nafees makes the situation worse. Seeing Mannat's care for Murad he experiences jealousy because Mannat no longer has all her attention on her siblings.

The two families eventually figure out that Mannat and Murad were in love before they married. This knowledge intensifies the existing tension.

Murad also feels jealous meeting Sabiha's brother, Hammad, especially when he finds out that he asked for Mannat's hand and was rejected but is now divorced. He compares the cars that they drive when talking with Mannat and his insecurities are evident. Nafeed does not help matters by showing preference to Hammad.

Mannar and Murad often argue, often regarding his married sisters turning up at the house to live adding to the financial strain, Murad's refusal to accept a honeymoon as a present from Mannats brothers and Mannat wanting to go back to work.

There is a particularly vicious fight instigated by Nudrat and one thing leads to another and Murad slaps Mannat. She slaps him back and decides to end the marriage.

Nafees starts dropping hints to Hammad that he should move back permanently and rekindle a relationship with Mannat. Meanwhile Razia and her daughters are trying to encourage him to consider marrying his cousin Nisho that has always held a torch for him.

While the divorce proceedings are going on, Mannat and Murad come face to face at a mutual friend's house. After an angry confrontation, they rekindle their relationship and start seeing each other in secret. Unaware of this development, their families continue to look for new partners for them.

Soon, Mannat becomes pregnant and tells her family that she has secretly been seeing Murad. They invite his family over. When Razia doubts the paternity of the baby, he finally stands up to her and defends Mannat in front of everyone. Mannat is impressed with his support, and the two of them officially reconcile.

The series ends with the Nafees marrying Fazeelat. It is implied that Mannat arranged their marriage.

== Cast ==
- Iqra Aziz as Mannat Murad Chaudhary: Nafees, Adil and Saad's sister; Murad's wife
- Talha Chahour as Chaudhary Murad Hashmat Ali: Razia and Hashmat's son; Nudrat, Fazeelat, Nighat and Itrat's brother; Mannat's husband
- Irsa Ghazal as Razia Chaudhary: Hashmat's widow; Murad, Itrat, Fazeelat, Nighat and Nudrat's mother
- Noor ul Hassan as Nafees: Adil, Saad and Mannat's brother; Fazeelat's husband
- Rabya Kulsoom as Azra: Murad's colleague; Mannat and Murad's friend
- Uzma Hassan as Sabiha Adil: Adil's wife
- Tipu Sharif as Adil: Nafees, Saad and Mannat's brother; Sabiha's husband
- Faiza Gillani as Nudrat Shoukat: Razia and Hashmat's daughter; Itrat, Fazeelat, Nighat and Murad's sister; Shoukat's wife; Pinky's mother
- Hammad Siddiqui as Shoukat Chaudhary: Nudrat's husband; Pinky's father
- Mizna Waqas as Fazeelat Nafees: Razia and Hashmat's daughter; Nudrat, Itrat, Nighat and Murad's sister; Nafees's wife
- Sana Nadir as Nighat "Niggi" Chaudhary: Razia and Hashmat's daughter; Nudrat, Itrat, Fazeelat and Murad's sister
- Rehma Zaman as Itrat Faisal : Razia and Hashmat's daughter; Faisal's wife; Nudrat, Fazeelat, Nighat and Murad's sister; Guriya's mother
- Ali Safina as Faisal: Itrat's Husband; Guriya's father
- Anam Tanveer as Sitara: Nudrat, Itrat, Fazeelat, Nighat and Murad's cousin
- Mustafa Changazi as Saad: Nafees, Adil and Mannat's brother.
- Sachal Afzal as Athar: Murad's best friend and colleague
- Parveen Akbar as Shamim Ara: Mannat and Murad's marriage matchmaker
- Salma Zafar Asim as Shakira: Razia's relative
- Rahat Ghani as Rida: Mannat's friend and colleague
- Abdul Hadi Khan as Ahad Adil: Adil and Sabiha's son
- Zarlish as Guriya: Itrat and Faisal's daughter
- Rubab as Pinky Shoukat: Nudrat's and Shoukat's daughter
- Kousar Siddiqui as Hajra
- Ali Rehman Khan as Hammad: Sabiha's brother

== Production ==
In November 2022, there were rumours that Farhan Saeed would appear opposite to Iqra Aziz after Suno Chanda in Syed Wajahat Hussain directed Mannat Murad. However, the same month it was confirmed that not Farhan Saeed, but Talha Chahour will play the lead role. It marked Iqra Aziz's second drama directed by Hussain after Khuda Aur Muhabbat (season 3).

== Reception ==
Gaitee Ara Siddiqi of The News International praised the themes and the narrative of the series, addition of the humour and Irsa Ghazal's performance as a dominant matiarch. A reviewer from The Nation praised the storyline of the series of the initial episodes but criticised the screenplay of the later episodes noting its inconsistencies.
