= Jannat Se Aagay =

2023 Pakistani television series

- جنت سے آگے
- Genre: Drama; Thriller; Ontology
- Written by: Umera Ahmed
- Directed by: Haseeb Hassan
- Starring: Kubra Khan; Ramsha Khan; Gohar Rasheed; Talha Chahour
- Theme music composer: Shuja Haider
- Opening theme: Singer; Quratulain Balouch and Shuja Haider
- Country of origin: Pakistan
- Original language: Urdu
- No. of episodes: 30

Production
- Producers: Abdullah Kadwani; Asad Qureshi
- Production company: 7th Sky Entertainment

Original release
- Network: Geo Entertainment
- Release: 11 August – 18 November 2023

Jannat Se Aagay (Urdu: جنت سے آگے, lit. 'Beyond Paradise') is a Pakistani drama television series produced by Abdullah Kadwani and Asad Qureshi under the banner 7th Sky Entertainment. It is directed by Haseeb Hassan and written by Umera Ahmed. It stars Kubra Khan, Ramsha Khan, Gohar Rasheed, Talha Chahour and others. The storyline delves into toxic trends within the entertainment industry, touching on themes such as sensationalism and public humiliation for ratings. The first episode of the series was aired on Geo Entertainment on 11 August 2023.

Nadia Khan, a former morning show host on Pakistani television, bashed the portrayal of the morning show culture in the series, to which Haseeb Hassan responded by emphasising on the 'fictitious' nature of the series.

== Plot ==
Tabassum Mughal, a middle class college student idealises Jannat Ali Khan, a celebrity morning show host. Tabassum has several problems in her house like the unemployment of her brother, marriage of her elder sister and biggest of them all is the poverty in her house as her father is about to retire from his job. She is engaged to her cousin Farooq Ahmed who loves her unconditionally and tries to fulfill her every demand. With the help of her friend, she learns that Jannat needs a nanny for her children, Aaliyan and Aima as it becomes difficult for her to manage them with the hectic schedule of her work. Her morning show is popular among the masses, maintains the top position on the television rating point chart due to which she becomes a celebrity figure. This leads to worsen her relationship with her husband Nauman. He then establishes relation with his colleague Zara and intends to marry her. However, he keeps this relationship as a secret to avoid any kind of financial trouble that he may have after separation with his successful wife. Jannat became doubtful of Nauman cheating on her but he came clean in front of her again and again.

Initially Tabassum's parents doesn't allow her to work as a maid in her house but later agree due to the condition of their house. She starts working in her house and gets fascinated by the lavish lifestyle of hers. Jannat at first doubts her for being loyal to her due to some incidents but later believes on her due to her devotion for her. When Jannat becomes fully confident about her innocence, she starts stealing her stuff. Whenever Jannat used to get doubtful on Tabassum again, she does something to gain her trust making Jannat feel guilty for her doubts. Jannat who doesn't have a happy married life and yearns for Nauman's love, admires Farooq's love for Tabassum. Jannat gives job to Farooq at the studio upon knowing he is searching for job. Tabassum started taking Farooq for granted and started affair with Jibran, AD at Jannat's show. She thinks he can give her a better future than Farooq. He complains about this to Jannat who confronts Tabassum and tells her not to lose a diamond like Farooq. She also exposes Jibran being engaged already to her. Jannat fires Jibran due to which he breaks up with Tabassum. Farooq and Tabassum get married but their married life isn't good because of her changed behaviour and greed. Farooq goes to Jannat and complains about Tabassum being changed since she started working with her and Jannat gives her off for some days. Slowly, Jannat's career started facing downfall. And soon, she started realising Tabassum's reality including her attempt to break her up with Nauman with the help of black magic and hence she fires Tabassum. When Jannat's jewelry and money got stolen, Nauman blames it on Tabassum on which Jannat agrees. The two went to Tabassum's house with police and raid her home. There, she discovers thefts of her other stuff which makes her sure that Tabassum has stolen money and jewelry despite her swearing on her unborn child that she hasn't stolen them. Tabassum and Farooq are arrested. The betrayal shatters Jannat's world and crushes Tabassum dreams of a luxurious life. She realised her mistakes and regrets them. However, Farooq stands by her. Jannat's rival Ayla bails Tabassum and Farooq and invites them on her show to speak against Jannat. Police exposes that Nauman has stolen money and jewelry and not Tabassum. Jannat gets devasted by this betrayal. She takes her complain against Tabassum back. Jannat confronts Nauman about the theft and express disappointment. Tabassum and Farooq appear on the show but they spoke truth instead of speaking against Jannat. Tabassum also admitted her mistakes and reveals shallow reality of morning shows. Jannat apologies on her show for glorifying wrong things and announces quitting the show.

Tabassum and Farooq start living a happy life. Jannat goes to Tabassum and apologise to her and patch up. Zara realises Nauman's theft and breaks up with her. She also regrets ruining Jannat's marriage and apologises to her. Nauman, too, regrets all his wrong doings and apologised to both Zara and Jannat.

Jannat takes divorce from Nauman and decide to co parent their children. After a year, Tabassum and Farooq live a happy and peaceful life with their daughter Fatima and on the other hand, Jannat finds solace in living simple life with her children Aaliyan and Aima.

== Cast ==
=== Main ===
- Kubra Khan as Jannat Ali Khan: A morning show host; Nauman's ex wife; Mrs. Khan's daughter; Aneela's sister; Aaliyan and Aima's mother.
- Ramsha Khan as Tabassum "Bitto" Mughal: Abid and Tasneem's daughter; Sirya, Naseem, Asghar and Aasia's sister; Farooq's wife.
- Gohar Rasheed as Nauman Ali: Jannat's ex husband; Zara's love interest; Aaliyan and Aima's father.
- Talha Chahour as Farooq Ahmed: Shabana's son; Shakeel's brother; Tabassum's husband.

=== Supporting ===
- Saboor Aly as Zara: Nauman's love interest.
- Lubna Aslam as Tasneem Mughal: Abid's wife; Sirya, Naseem, Tabassum, Asghar and Aasia's mother; Shabana's sister.
- Dania Enwer as Naseem "Nammo" Mughal: Abid and Tasneem's daughter; Sirya, Tabassum, Asghar and Aasia's sister.
- Aina Asif as Aasia "Guriya" Mughal: Abid and Tasneem's daughter; Sirya, Naseem, Tabassum and Asghar's sister; Shakeel's love interest.
- Rahil Siddiqui as Asghar "Munna" Mughal: Abid and Tasneem's son; Sirya, Naseem, Tabassum and Aasia's brother.
- Shehryar Zaidi as Abid Mughal: Tasneem's husband; Sirya, Naseem, Tabassum, Asghat and Aasia's father.
- Ayesha Jahanzeb as Aila: Morning Show Host; Jannat's rival.
- Hina Khawaja Bayat as Shabana "Shabbo" Ahmed: Farooq and Shakeel's mother; Tasneem's sister.
- Faiza Gillani as Sirya Mughal: Abid and Tasneem's daughter; Naseem, Tabassum, Asghar and Aasia’s sister; Naeem's wife.
- Hoorain Khan as Aima Nauman: Nauman and Jannat's daughter; Aaliyan's sister.
- Aiman Zaman as Chanda: Tabassum's friend.
- Hamzah Tariq as Jibran: Jannat's former AD.
- Ismat Zaidi as Nauman's mother.
- Shamim Hilaly as Mrs. Khan: Jannat and Aneela's mother.
- Areej Chaudhary as Aneela Ali Khan: Mrs. Khan's daughter; Jannat's sister.
- Akber Islam as Jannat's Show's Channel GM.

=== Guest ===
- Shazia Qaiser as Nadira's mother (Episode 1)
- Fahima Awan as bride in morning show (Episode 2)
- Shabbir Jan as Elahi Baksh Memon (Episode 5)
- Humaira Bano as Ms. Shamsi, School principal (Episode 6)
- Zoya Nasir as Amber, an actress and Jannat’s rival (Episode 6)

== Production ==
In September 2022, it reported that Kubra, Ramsha, Rasheed and Chahour will play the leading roles in Hassan's directorial and Ahmed's written Jannat Se Aagay. The principal photography began on 29 August 2022. It marked Kubra's return to television after Sang-e-Mah (2022).

The first teaser of the series featuring Kubra was released by the network on 24 July 2023.

== Reception ==
=== Critical reception ===
While reviewing the initial episodes, Gaitee Ara Siddiqi of The News International praised the Ahmed's writing while noticing the dialogues and "unseen" plotline, Kubra and Ramsha's performances but criticised the former's dialogue delivery. Zainab Mossadiq of The News International praised the story, direction and performances of the actors stating, "Jannat Se Aagay is a well-rounded production. The flawless direction and applause-worthy execution of the story have reeled in and maintained a dedicated audience. The brilliant performances by all the major leads add to the appeal for the audience." Nudrat Nazir of The Nation praised the performances of the actors especially of Kubra Khan and Ramsha Khan and the portrayal of media but was critical of the portrayal of a cheater husband.

== Accolades ==
Year	Award	Category	Nominee	Result	Ref(s)
2025	23rd Lux Style Awards	Best Television Director	Haseeb Hassan	Nominated	
2025	23rd Lux Style Awards	Best Television Writer	Umera Ahmed	Nominated	
