= Ready Steady No =

2019 Pakistani romantic comedy film

- Film poster
- Directed by: Hisham Bin Munawwar
- Written by: Hisham Bin Munawwar
- Produced by: Hisham Bin Munawwar
- Starring: Faisal Saif; Amna Ilyas
- Cinematography: Fazal Ahmed; Muhammad Ali
- Edited by: Vasi Hassan
- Music by: Baqir Abbas; Hassan Badshah
- Production company: Obsessive Compulsive Dreamers
- Distributed by: Hum Films; Eveready Films
- Release date: 19 July 2019
- Country: Pakistan
- Language: Urdu

Ready Steady No is a 2019 Pakistani romantic comedy film. The film features Amna Ilyas, Salman Shahid, Faisal Saif, Zain Afzal, Marhoom Ahmed Bilal, Nargis Rasheed and Ismail Tara. It is written, directed, and produced by Hisham Bin Munawwar. It released on 19 July 2019 under the banners of Hum Films and Eveready Films.

== Cast ==
- Faisal Saif as Faisal
- Amna Ilyas as Razia
- Salman Shahid as Chaudhry Sahab; Razia's father
- Zain Afzal as Maulana
- Ismail Tara as Faisal's father
- Nargis Rasheed as Faisal's mother
- Nayyar Ejaz as a palmist
- Ashraf Khan
- Marhoom Ahmad Bilal as Advocate Mazhar Fakhar
- Saleem Albela
- Muneer Ahmed as Detective Muneer; Razia's cousin

== Soundtrack ==
Film music has been directed by Baqir Abbas and produced by Hassan Badshah.

No.	Title	Lyrics	Singer(s)	Length
1.	"Dekho Dekho"	Hisham Bin Munawar	Hisham Bin Munawar, Rahma Ali	4:40
2.	"Nachee Ja"	Hisham Bin Munawar	Asrar	3:10

== Critical reception ==
Omair Alavi wrote that the film "makes your belief stronger in clean comedy" because it "delivers a clean comedy" on "situations, more than dialogues." Shafiq Ul Hasan rated 2 out of 5 stars and wrote in The Express Tribune that it "is an earnest attempt" and "offers a fresh script" to "those who like stage plays and prefer loud comedy." Sonia Ashraf of Dawn Images said that the "plot for this romantic comedy sounds simple enough", unfortunately "it fizzled out" due to "a poor script". Asjad Khan of OY! wrote that it "is an entertaining film, with a social message" and "a worthy effort for "an independent film maker", however, "it could have been better if" focused a "bit more in building the relationship between" the lead pair. Yousuf Mehmood rated 3 out of 5 stars and wrote on PakistaniCinema.net "the film drags a little, and its cinematic appeal is lacking" but it is "a purely comedic film where the audience was howling laughing, along with their families." Usman Ghafoor of Gulf News commented, "The humour here is essentially situational and verbal", but "throughout the narrative, the film keeps returning to slapstick", and "cinematography is perhaps its other weak point." Hassan Hassan of Galaxy Lollywood said that it is a "socially relevant" film whose "cast offer moments of fun with their acting" but rated only 1.5 star out of 5 and added that "the cast alone, isn't able to save the film from being a disastrously boring affair" as it is not entertaining.

== Accolades ==
Date of ceremony	Award	Category	Recipient(s) and nominee(s)	Result	Ref.
December 31, 2020	Lux Style Awards	Best Film	Hisham Bin Munawar	Nominated	
December 31, 2020	Lux Style Awards	Best Director	Hisham Bin Munawar	Nominated	
December 31, 2020	Lux Style Awards	Best Actor	Salman Shahid	Nominated	
