= Rutba (TV series) =

2026 Pakistani television drama

- Television release poster
- رُتبہ
- Genre: Drama; Romance
- Written by: Umera Ahmed
- Directed by: Haseeb Hassan
- Starring: Mehwish Hayat; Zahid Ahmed; Hiba Bukhari; Talha Chahour
- Country of origin: Pakistan
- Original language: Urdu
- No. of seasons: 1
- No. of episodes: 13

Production
- Producers: Humayun Saeed; Sana Shahnawaz
- Production locations: Karachi, Pakistan
- Camera setup: Multi-camera setup
- Running time: 38 minutes
- Production companies: Six Sigma Plus; Next Level Entertainment

Original release
- Network: ARY Digital
- Release: 6 October 2026 – present

Rutba (رتبہ; transl. Status) is a 2026 Pakistani romantic drama television series written by Umera Ahmed and directed by Haseeb Hassan. Produced by Humayun Saeed and Sana Shahnawaz under the production banners of Six Sigma Plus and Next Level Entertainment, the series stars Talha Chahour, Hiba Bukhari, Mehwish Hayat and Zahid Ahmed in leading roles. It premiered on ARY Digital on 6 October 2026.

== Plot ==
The series follows Hadi, a police officer whose professional responsibilities and personal relationships become increasingly complicated after he is posted to a new location. His interactions with influential individuals bring him into situations that test his principles and judgment.

== Cast ==
- Mehwish Hayat as Sheeli
- Zahid Ahmed as Meer
- Hiba Bukhari as Mahnoor
- Talha Chahour as Hadi
- Ali Tahir
- Salma Hasan
- Irsa Ghazal
- Shehryar Zaidi
- Aamir Qureshi
- Usman Chaudery
- Ahsan Murad
- Sikandar Nawaz

== Production ==
Rutba was written by Umera Ahmed and directed by Haseeb Hassan. The series was produced by Humayun Saeed and Sana Shahnawaz under Six Sigma Plus and Next Level Entertainment. The drama was announced by ARY Digital in October 2026.

In an interview with Something Haute, actor Talha Chahour revealed that the drama's narrative and characters were inspired by real-life individuals and events. He explained that this connection was one of the reasons he accepted the role of Hadi. Chahour also stated that he conducted research into the character's background to understand his experiences and motivations. Chahour described Hadi as a character whose integrity is tested by the environment in which he works. He also discussed the character's personal struggles and the responsibilities associated with holding a position of authority.

Rutba premiered on ARY Digital on 6 October 2026. The series airs on Mondays and Tuesdays at 8:00 pm Pakistan Standard Time. Episodes are also available through the ARY Plus streaming platform.

== Reception ==
In its review, Dawn discussed the series initial storyline and the contrast between its central characters. The review highlighted the developing crime narrative and the performances of the principal cast. In another review published in November 2026, Dawn commented on the changing dynamics between Hadi, Mahnoor, Sheeli and Meer. It also discussed the performances of Talha Chahour, Mehwish Hayat and Zahid Ahmed.

In a review for The News International, Gaitee Ara Siddiqi discussed the series screenplay, production, pacing and performances. The review praised the performances of the principal cast and described the initial episodes as effective in establishing the characters and their backgrounds. It also highlighted the mystery surrounding Sheeli and Meer's interest in Hadi and Mahnoor.
