= Tani Begum =

Pakistani actress

- تانی بیگم
- Born: Khursheed Begum; 19 October 1940 (age 85); Lahore, British India
- Education: University of Lahore
- Occupations: Actress; Singer
- Years active: 1965–2016
- Spouses: Adeeb (divorced)
- Children: Seemi Zaidi (daughter); Sehar (daughter)

Khursheed Begum, also known as Tani Begum, is a Pakistani actress and singer. She acted in both Urdu and Punjabi films and is known for her roles in films Sangdil (1968), Dard (1969), Heer Ranjha (1970), Insaf Aur Qanoon (1971), Sheran De Puttar Sher (1981) and Ek Din Bahu Ka (1982).

== Early life ==
Tani was born in Lahore, British India and she completed her education from University of Lahore.

== Career ==
Tani Begum made her debut an actress in 1965 in Punjabi film Malangi which was a super hit film at the box office. She appeared in films Genterman, Dulla Haidri, Yamla Jatt, Saza, Mehram Dil Da, Anjan, Anwara and Taxi Driver. Then she changed her name to Tani Begum and later she appeared in films Dil Ek Aain, Mann Ki Jeet, Raju, Wichhria Sathi, Baharon Ki Manzil, 2 Badan, Pyar Hi Pyar and Dunya Gol Hay. Since then she appeared in films Daaman, Lajawab, Anokha Daaj, Toofan Tay Chattan, Yeh Zamana Aur Hay, 2 Dil and Noukar Tay Malik.

She also used to sing songs in films and on radio and then started working in dramas as well on PTV. She appeared in the dramas Teesra Kinara, Sona Chandi, Mirat-ul-Uroos and Neelay Hath. She worked in over 150s films and several dramas.

In late 2016, she retired and moved to the United States to live with her daughter Seemi Zaidi. at Maryland and there she runs her boutique and jewellery shop.

== Personal life ==
Tani married five times and all five marriages ended in divorce. One of her spouses was actor Adeeb. She has five children including two sons and three daughters. Tani's daughters, Sehar and Seemi Zaidi, were also actresses.

== Filmography ==
=== Television ===
Year	Title	Role
1980	Teesra Kinara	Begum Aziz
1982	Sona Chandi	Basheera
1985	Dubai Chalo	Ayesha
1988	Mirat-ul-Uroos	Azmat
1989	Neelay Hath	Rani
1990	Mai Aur Kamai	Shehla's mother
1992	Diwana	Begum
1994	Goonga Aur Company	Bushra
1996	Ranjish	Babra
2001	Kajal Ghar	Producer

=== Film ===
Year	Film	Language
1965	Malangi	Punjabi
1966	Qabeela	Urdu
1966	Watan Ka Sipahi	Urdu
1966	Sarhad	Urdu
1966	Kon Kisi Ka	Urdu
1966	Bhai Jan	Urdu
1966	Bharia Mela	Punjabi
1966	Baghi Sardar	Urdu
1966	Badnaam	Urdu
1966	Tabedar	Punjabi
1967	Insaniyat	Urdu
1967	Chann Ji	Punjabi
1967	Imam Din Gohavia	Punjabi
1967	Albela	Urdu
1967	Dil Deevana	Urdu
1967	Shola Aur Shabnam	Urdu
1967	Wohti	Punjabi
1967	Dost Dushman	Urdu
1967	Mela	Punjabi
1967	Mirza Jatt	Punjabi
1968	Sangdil	Urdu
1968	Shehanshah-e-Jahangir	Urdu
1968	Ek Hi Rasta	Urdu
1968	Josh-e-Inteqam	Urdu
1968	Behan Bhai	Urdu
1968	Sharik-e-Hayyat	Urdu
1968	Dil Diya Dard Liya	Urdu
1968	Meri Dosti Mera Pyar	Urdu
1968	Mujhay Jeenay Do	Urdu
1968	Paristan	Urdu
1968	Mera Ghar Meri Jannat	Urdu
1968	Chalbaz	Punjabi
1968	Murad Baloch	Punjabi
1968	Beti Beta	Urdu
1968	Shahi Mahal	Urdu
1969	Nikkay Hundian Da Pyar	Punjabi
1969	Dard	Urdu
1969	Chann Veer	Punjabi
1969	Zindagi Kitni Haseen Hay	Urdu
1969	Najo	Punjabi
1969	Fasana-e-Dil	Urdu
1969	Lachhi	Punjabi
1969	Ik Nageena	Urdu
1969	Sheran Day Puttar Sher	Punjabi
1969	Meri Bhabhi	Urdu
1969	Koonj Wichhar Geyi	Punjabi
1969	Genterman	Punjabi
1969	Dulla Haidri	Punjabi
1969	Nai Laila Naya Majnu	Urdu
1969	Yamla Jatt	Punjabi
1969	Saza	Urdu
1970	Mehram Dil Da	Punjabi
1970	Anjan	Urdu
1970	Anwara	Punjabi
1970	Taxi Driver	Punjabi
1970	Noreen	Urdu
1970	Heer Ranjha	Punjabi
1970	Rabb Di Shaan	Punjabi
1970	Att Khuda Da Vair	Punjabi
1970	Dera Sajna Da	Punjabi
1971	Asghara	Punjabi
1971	Dunya Paisay Di	Punjabi
1971	Dosti	Urdu
1971	Insaf Aur Qanoon	Urdu
1971	Parai Aag	Urdu
1971	Jatt Da Qoul	Punjabi
1971	Al-Asifa	Urdu
1972	Japani Guddi	Punjabi
1972	2 Pattar Anaran Day	Punjabi
1972	Ik Doli 2 Kahar	Punjabi
1972	Kon Dillan Dian Janay	Punjabi
1972	Dil Ek Aaina	Urdu
1972	Mann Ki Jeet	Urdu
1972	Raju	Punjabi
1973	Wichhria Sathi	Punjabi
1973	Ziddi	Punjabi
1973	Baharon Ki Manzil	Urdu
1974	2 Badan	Urdu
1974	Pyar Hi Pyar	Urdu
1974	Dunya Gol Hay	Urdu
1974	Kei Saal Pehlay	Urdu
1974	Phool Meray Gulshan Ka	Urdu
1974	Noukar Wohti Da	Punjabi
1974	Jurm Tay Nafrat	Punjabi
1974	Hashu Khan	Punjabi
1975	Pulekha	Punjabi
1975	BeAulad	Punjabi
1975	Sir Da Badla	Punjabi
1975	Teray Meray Sapnay	Urdu
1975	Sheeda Pastol	Punjabi
1976	Yaar Da Sehra	Punjabi
1976	Akhar	Punjabi
1976	Deewar	Urdu
1976	Sohni Mehinwal	Punjabi
1976	Yarana	Punjabi
1977	Puttar Tay Qanoon	Punjabi
1977	Inteqam Di Agg	Punjabi
1978	Ek Chehra 2 Roop	Urdu
1978	Kora Kaghaz	Urdu
1978	Intekhab	Urdu
1979	Tarana	Urdu
1979	2 Rastay	Urdu
1979	Wehshi Gujjar	Punjabi
1979	Dubai Chalo	Punjabi
1980	Hirasat	Punjabi
1980	Daaman	Urdu
1981	Lajawab	Urdu
1981	Anokha Daaj	Punjabi
1981	Toofan Tay Chattan	Punjabi
1981	Yeh Zamana Aur Hay	Urdu
1981	2 Dil	Urdu
1982	Noukar Tay Malik	Punjabi
1982	Shaan	Punjabi
1982	Aaina Aur Zindagi	Urdu
1982	Dostana	Punjabi
1982	Ek Din Bahu Ka	Urdu
1982	Shera	Punjabi
1983	Dillan day Souday	Punjabi
1983	Deevangi	Urdu
1983	Jinn Chacha	Punjabi
1983	Susral Chalo	Punjabi
1983	Ek Doojay Kay Liye	Urdu
1983	Bau Ji	Punjabi
1983	Samundar Par	Punjabi
1983	Dehshat Khan	Punjabi
1983	Kainat	Urdu
1983	Wadda Khan	Punjabi
1983	Dushman Pyara	Punjabi
1983	Mirza, Majnu, Ranjha	Punjabi
1984	Kalia	Punjabi
1984	Kalyar	Punjabi
1985	Hero	Urdu
1985	Haidar Khan	Punjabi
1985	Ziddi Khan	Punjabi
1987	Malka	Punjabi
1987	Khanu Sher	Punjabi
1988	Dilawar Khan	Punjabi
1988	Basheera in Trouble	Punjabi
1988	Jang	Punjabi
1990	Manga	Punjabi
1992	Nargis	Punjabi / Urdu
1993	Gunnah	Urdu
1993	Toofan	Punjabi
1994	Athra Gujjar	Punjabi
1994	Khubsoorat Sheitan	Urdu
2016	Sajra Pyar	Punjabi
