= Jama Taqseem =

2025 Pakistani television series

- Genre: Family drama; Social drama
- Written by: Sarwat Nazir
- Directed by: Ali Hassan
- Starring: Mawra Hocane; Talha Chahour; Javed Sheikh; Beo Raana Zafar
- Country of origin: Pakistan
- Original language: Urdu
- No. of episodes: 30

Production
- Producer: Momina Duraid
- Production company: MD Productions

Original release
- Network: Hum TV
- Release: September 10, 2025

Jama Taqseem is a Pakistani television series written by Sarwat Nazir and directed by Ali Hassan. Produced by Momina Duraid under MD Productions, the series stars Mawra Hocane and Talha Chahour in the lead roles. It premiered on Hum TV on 10 September 2025.

The story centres on the dynamics of a joint family and the differences between traditional domestic expectations and the aspirations of younger family members. The casting brought Mawra Hocane and Talha Chahour together as the central married couple.

== Plot ==
The series follows Laila and Qais, a newly married couple from contrasting family backgrounds. Laila is an educated woman who comes from a relatively liberal household, whereas Qais belongs to a traditional joint family headed by his father.

After their marriage, Laila moves into her husband's family home and encounters expectations that conflict with her personal interests and upbringing. Her educational qualifications and ambitions receive little recognition, while domestic responsibilities become a major part of her daily routine.

Qais struggles to balance his responsibilities towards his wife and his family. As disagreements develop within the household, the couple confronts questions concerning privacy, personal independence and the boundaries of family involvement. The story also explores tensions between relatives, generational differences and the consequences of harassment within a family environment.

== Cast ==
- Mawra Hocane as Laila
- Talha Chahour as Qais
- Javed Sheikh as Rafiq
- Beo Raana Zafar as Shahida
- Hassan Ahmed as Hameed
- Madiha Rizvi as Nighat
- Amna Malik as Rashida
- Saad Azhar
- Amna Khan as Nudrat
- Deepak Perwani as Ashar
- Tazeen Hussain as Zoobia
- Hania Ahmed as Shafaq
- Nazeeha Zainab as Sidra
- Elahi Bux Khan as Zeeshan

== Reception ==
In October 2025, Maliha Rehman, writing for Dawn, observed that the drama resonated with viewers because its depiction of domestic pressures reflected experiences found in many Pakistani households. The review praised its writing, direction and performances, while noting that its subject matter could be emotionally difficult to watch. It also highlighted the series' treatment of women's domestic responsibilities, family interference and the effects of restrictive household environments.

In January 2026, Amber Javed Malik included the series in her retrospective assessment of Pakistani television dramas published by Images. She placed it among the dramas that worked during the year, highlighting its exploration of the transition from joint-family living to independent households. However, she noted that certain developments in the storyline affected its overall execution.

In December 2025, Sana Hussain, reviewing the series for Images, described it as a thoughtful and socially relevant drama. The review praised its handling of sensitive subjects, particularly harassment and marital boundaries, while also identifying shortcomings in some later story developments.
