= Ullu Baraye Farokht Nahi =

2013 Pakistani television series

- Written by: Amna Mufti
- Directed by: Kashif Nisar
- Starring: Nauman Ijaz; Saba Qamar; Noman Masood; Sohail Ahmed; Yumna Zaidi; Omair Rana; Irsa Ghazal
- Opening theme: Aaj Rang Hai by Sahir Ali Bagga
- Composer: Sahir Ali Bagga
- Country of origin: Pakistan
- Original language: Urdu
- No. of episodes: 25

Production
- Executive producer: Momina Duraid
- Producer: Noman Masood
- Production company: Naughty Forty Productions

Original release
- Network: Hum TV
- Release: 30 April – 15 October 2013

Ullu Baraaye Farokht Nahi (Urdu: الو براۓ فروخت نہیں, lit. 'The owl is not for sale') is a Pakistani drama television series based on the afsana of the same name by Amna Mufti, which was first published in 2009 in a monthly Urdu digest Shuaa. Directed by Kashif Nisar, the series stars an ensemble cast of Nauman Ijaz, Sohail Ahmed, Saba Qamar, Uzma Hassan, Irsa Ghazal, Yumna Zaidi, and Noman Masood in prominent roles. Dealing with the subjects of feudalism and Watta satta (exchange marriage), the series is a dark tale of revenge, violence and tragedy that destroys two families.

Ullu Baraye Farokht Nahi received praise from critics for its direction, script and performances of the actors and was nominated in all categories at the 13th Lux Style Awards.

== Plot ==
In a village, two estranged brothers, Mian Yakoob Malkana and Mian Ishaq Malkana, reunite their families through a Watta satta marriage. However, their reconciliation is short-lived as Ishaq seeks revenge for his son's murder by killing Nazeer Fatima, Mian Yakoob's daughter, and burying her under an elm tree. Mian Ghulam Fareed, Mian Yakoob's son, manipulates the housemaid, Sajida, into stealing keys and later suffocates his father. He mistreats his wife, Gul-e-Rana, and suspects foul play in his father's death but keeps it hidden.

Aasia Yakoob Malkana, Ghulam Fareed's sister who lives and studies in the city, falls for her married teacher, Professor Chuhan, leading to a decline in her studies. Gul-e-Rana takes charge of the household and discovers her pregnancy shortly after. Ghulam Fareed improves his relationship with her and arranges Sajida's marriage to Wali Muhammad, leading to her suicide.

Ghulam Fareed's elder sister, Kaneez Fatima, affectionately known as Aapi Ji by the younger family members, intends to marry off Aasia to Professor Chuhan when visits her, as per Aasia's desire. However, Ghulam Fareed strongly opposes this plan. Gul-e-Rana gives birth to twins and calls Aapi Ji back to the haveli. Ishaq Malkana visits his grandchildren, and Aapi Ji confronts him about Nazeer Fatima's death. She learns the truth from Zaid, a dervish and the former servant, and reveals it to the family.

Ghulam Ali, Ishaq's son, is shot and killed, leaving both families devastated. Ishaq seeks revenge, and Ghulam Fareed's sons are killed. Aapi Ji's health declines, and Ghulam Fareed brings Zaid to the haveli purposely to treat her, rather than consulting the doctor. To escape from the political intrigues of the haveli, Aapi Ji proposes marriage to Zaid, but he refuses. Ghulam Fareed discovers their plan and murders Zaid, imprisoning Aapi Ji in a room.

Aasia's mental health deteriorates further, and Ghulam Fareed exploits Aapi Ji's vulnerability, subjecting unsuspecting girls to assault. When the newlywed Zubia gets trapped, Aasia's friend, Samra, now an NGO worker, comes to rescue Zubia on her husband's request and learns about the heinous crimes in the haveli. She devises a plan with Sir Chauhan and recovers Zubia with the help of Ishaq Malkana. She also manages to escape Aasia with Wali Muhammad, who married secretly.

Ghulam Fareed attempts to locate Aasia but fails. On a dark night, Samra and a journalist accompanying her are shot by unknown assailants around the haveli, while trying to help Aasia after her return to the haveli. Enraged, Ghulam Fareed plots to kill his sisters but accidentally ingests the poisoned Sardai meant for them. The haveli is left deserted, with only Aapi Ji and Gul-e-Rana remaining, both traumatized. The story is later fictionalized by the author, Professor Chuhan, who receives an award for this book.

== Cast ==
- Noman Ijaz as Mian Ghulam Farid
- Saba Qamar as Gul-e-Rana
- Noman Masood as Wali Muhammad
- Sohail Ahmed as Ishaq Malkana
- Yumna Zaidi as Aasiya Yaqoob
- Omair Rana as Sir Chauhan
- Kamran Mujahid as Ghulam Ali
- Irsa Ghazal as Kaneez Fatima
- Uzma Hassan as Sajida
- Saleem Mairaj as Zaid
- Nargis Rasheed as Batool
- Hina Rizvi as Nazeer Fatima
- Faiza Gillani as Zubia
- Habib as Yaqoob Malkana

== Production ==
Originally slated for release by another network, which attempted to interfere with the script, producer Nauman Masood stood firm, ensuring the story was shot as written, without any changes. Writer Amna Mufti credited Nisar with realizing her vision.

== Broadcast and release ==
The series premiered on Hum TV on April 30, 2013, in a prime-time night slot. However, due to low viewership, it was later shifted to a late-night slot after a few episodes.

The show also aired in India on Zindagi from 3 February 2015 to 21 March 2015 under title Aaj Rang Hai.

== Reception ==
=== Critical reception ===
In a year-end article by The Express Tribune, the series garnered widespread critical acclaim for its outstanding direction, writing, and performances. Director Kashif Nisar won the People's Choice Award for his exceptional work, with reviewers praising his skill in navigating complex characters and storylines without losing focus on the main narrative. The script by Amna Mufti was also commended for its nuance and depth. The cast performances, with Nauman Ijaz, Saba Qamar, and Sohail Ahmed receiving particular praise. Additionally, Irsa Ghazal won the People's Choice Award for Best Supporting Actress.

Sadaf Haider of DAWN Images included it in the honourable mentions of iconic Pakistani TV dramas. In another article, Haider described the series as "surprising", "shocking", and "addictive", but criticized it for dragging.

=== Awards and nominations ===
Year	Award	Category	Recipient(s) and nominee(s)	Result	Ref
2013	Hum Awards	Best Actor in a negative role	Nauman Ijaz	Won	
2014	Lux Style Awards	Best Television Writer	Amna Mufti	Won	
2014	Lux Style Awards	Best Television Actress	Irsa Ghazal	Nominated	
2014	Lux Style Awards	Best Television Actor	Nauman Ijaz	Nominated	
2014	Lux Style Awards	Best Television Play - Satellite	Noman Masood	Nominated	
2014	Lux Style Awards	Best Television Director	Kashif Nisar	Nominated	
