= Mirat-ul-Uroos (2012 TV series) =

Pakistani TV series (2012–2013)

- Intertitle on Zindagi as Aina Dulhan Ka featuring Aamina Sheikh (right) and Mehwish Hayat.
- Also known as: Aaina Dulhan Ka
- Genre: Romance; Family drama
- Based on: Mirat-ul-Uroos by Nazir Ahmad Dehlvi
- Written by: Umera Ahmad
- Directed by: Anjum Shahzad
- Starring: Aamina Sheikh; Mikaal Zulfiqar; Mehwish Hayat; Ahsan Khan; (For entire cast see the section on cast below)
- Theme music composer: Composer; Shani Haider; Lyricist; Naseer Turabi
- Opening theme: Mera Chhota Sa Ek Sapna Hai (sung by Fariha Pervez); Har Saans Gawahi Deta Hai (sung by Mehwish Hayat)
- Country of origin: Pakistan
- Original language: Urdu
- No. of seasons: 1
- No. of episodes: 30

Production
- Running time: Approx. 40-45 Minutes
- Production company: 7th Sky Entertainment

Original release
- Network: Geo Entertainment
- Release: 4 December 2012 – 6 June 2013

Mirat-ul-Uroos (Urdu: مراۃُ العروسlit: The Mirror of the Bride) is a Pakistani telenovela inspired by the novel of the same name by Nazir Ahmad Dehlvi. It was directed by Anjum Shahzad and written by Umera Ahmad. It aired on Geo Entertainment in Pakistan from 4 December 2012 to 6 June 2013. The story of the serial is linked to the original story of the two sisters Akbari and Asghari and revolves around the granddaughters of Akbari, played by Aamina Sheikh and Mehwish Hayat, and the grandsons of Asghari, played by Mikaal Zulfiqar and Ahsan Khan.

== Plot summary ==
Mirat-ul-Uroos contrasts the lives of the grandchildren of Akbari and Asghari. Akbari's first granddaughter Aiza is arrogant, a spendthrift and has been raised with a lot of love, while her second granddaughter Aima is the exact opposite of Aiza. Asghari's grandsons are Hammad and Hashim, who fall for and eventually marry Aiza and Aima, respectively. Aiza shows her true colours in her in-laws' house. Hammad has an extramarital affair, and Aiza leaves him, but they eventually reunite.

== Cast ==
- Mehwish Hayat as Aima
- Aamina Sheikh as Aiza
- Ahsan Khan as Hashim
- Mikaal Zulfiqar as Hammad
- Samina Ahmad as Asghari
- Ayesha Khan as Akbari
- Momal Sheikh as Hamna
- Umer Naru as Farhan
- Afraz Rasool as Zain
- Sarah Khan as Javeria a.ka. Joey
- Saba Faisal as Rafia; Hammad and Haashim's mother
- Azra Mohyeddin as Amna; Aiza and Aima's mother
- Mohsin Gillani as Wajahat Akbar Choudhary; Hammad and Haashim's father
- Hashim Butt as Naasir Asghar Choudhry; Aiza and Aima's father

== Soundtrack ==
The theme song of the series "Har Saans Gawahi Deta Hai" was performed by Mehwish Hayat and Fariha Pervez.

== Production ==
=== Background and development ===
Mirat-ul-Uroos, the first novel in Urdu literature, was written by Nazir Ahmad Dehlvi, also known as Deputy Nazir Ahmad, and first published in 1869. The novel promotes the cause of female education in Muslim and Indian society. This TV adaptation is the third of Nazir's novel, but producer Abdullah Kadwani clarified that it is not a direct adaptation, rather inspired by the novel, with the story picking up where the original novel concludes. Renowned Pakistani author and screenwriter Umera Ahmad penned the script, having previously collaborated with the production house on serials like Doraha (2008) and Meri Zaat Zarra-e-Benishan (2010).

== International broadcast ==
Mirat-ul-Uroos was also broadcast in India by Zindagi, under the title Aaina Dulhan Ka, premiering on 10 November 2014 and ending its run on 13 December 2014. Due to its popularity in India, it started to run again from 8 May 2015 at 6 pm.
