= Punjab University College of Information Technology =

Pakistani computer science college

- Former name: Department of Computer Science
- Type: Public
- Established: 2000
- Parent institution: University of the Punjab, Lahore
- Vice-Chancellor: Prof. Dr. Syed Muhammad Ali Shah (TI)(SI)
- Principal: Prof. Dr. Muhammad Kamran Malik (Central Administrator)
- Dean: Prof. Dr. Shahzad Sarwar
- Academic staff: 100
- Administrative staff: 150
- Students: 2,500
- Undergraduates: 2,200
- Location: Lahore, Punjab, Pakistan
- Campus: 20 acres (8.1 ha); Urban
- Colors: Sky blue and white
- Nickname: PUCIT
- Website: www.pucit.edu.pk

Punjab University College of Information Technology (PUCIT) is a college of computer science and information technology at the University of the Punjab located in Lahore, Pakistan. The college is located on the university's Allama Iqbal Campus (Old Campus) in Bahawalpur Block near old Anarkali and PUCIT Quaid-i-Azam Campus (New Campus) is located on Syed Kabeer Ali Shah road, Canal Bank, Lahore.

== History ==
The college was established with the name Center for Computer Science in 1988. It was situated in the Center for Solid State Physics on the University of the Punjab's new campus. The first program offered was a year-long, two-semester postgraduate diploma for which 24 students were registered. This program was offered until 2000.

In 1991 the Center for Computer Science was upgraded to the Department of Computer Science and for the first time a full-fledged two-year MSc program (annual system) in computer science was offered. The first ever intake for the program was 15 students, which eventually increased to 30.

In December 2000, the department was upgraded to a full-fledged college under the new name of the Punjab University College of Information Technology.

== Administration ==
The current Central Administrator is Prof. Dr. Muhammad Kamran Malik.

== Laboratories ==
The college has four computer laboratories providing students access to the internet. A total of 800 plus computers along with internet facilities are available for the students. For postgraduate students, a separate laboratory is present while an electronics laboratory is made for electronics and physics purposes.

== Research labs ==
The college has eight computer laboratories providing students access to the internet. A total of 800 plus computers along with internet facilities are available for the students. For postgraduate students, a separate laboratory is present while an electronics laboratory is made for electronics and physics purposes.

=== National Center of Artificial Intelligence (NCAI), University of the Punjab ===
The National Center of Artificial Intelligence (NCAI), University of the Punjab is funded by Higher Education Commission of Government of Pakistan with a capital cost of PKRS 97.705 million. The central aim is to facilitate the researchers in the field of AI; help them establish and grow AI industry following international trends and seek solutions to the indigenous problems through AI.

=== Artificial Intelligence and Multidisciplinary (AIM) Research Lab ===
Artificial Intelligence and Multidisciplinary (AIM) research laboratory is established in May 2012 to design and utilize cross-disciplinary research tools and techniques for human understanding of such hidden mysteries and craft new artifacts based on research findings for the well-being of humanity. The Lab has secured research funding from various sources including National Information and Communication Technology Research and Development (ICT RnD) fund, Higher Education Commission of Pakistan etc.

== Achievements ==
- 2004 ZABVISION - first in the All Pakistan On-spot Programming Competition
- 2004 SOFTEC - third in the 9th All Pakistan SOFTEC' 04 - held at NUCES, Lahore
- 2006 SOFTEC - Stood 3rd in the All Asia Programming Competition - held at NUCES, Lahore - Team (Fayyaz, Rizwan, and Zaheer)
- 2007 - first in the All Asia Programming Competition - held at NUCES, Lahore - Team (Sohaib, Shahzad and others)
- Third in the All Pakistan English debating competition
- A PUCIT student was selected among the top eight speakers in the "Student Convention"
- A PUCIT student was selected among the top three articles writers in a National article writing competition held by The News
