= Rehar =

Town in Uttar Pradesh, India

Coordinates: 29°22′N 78°46′E

Rehar is a town in Bijnor district, in the Indian state of Uttar Pradesh.

== History ==
Rehar Riyasat was ruled by Rathore kings during medieval and British times, who are believed to have originally come from present-day Rajasthan to settled in Rehar. Rehar Riyasat was ruled by Raja Bhup Rathod, followed by his son Raja Kundan Rathod, and then by Kundan's son Raja Rai Lakhan Singh.

During the revolt of 1857, Kuwar Bhup Singh Rathod emerged as a prominent rebels in Bijnor. At that time British officers residing in Amagarh were attacked and killed. Following the revolt, the Rehar estate was reduced to only 300 villages. The town, hosted a fort whose ruins survive at the Government Navratan Inter College.

Residents paid agricultural taxes (lagaan) to the ruling family, totalling around Rs 16,698 during the time of Rai Lakhan Singh Rathod.

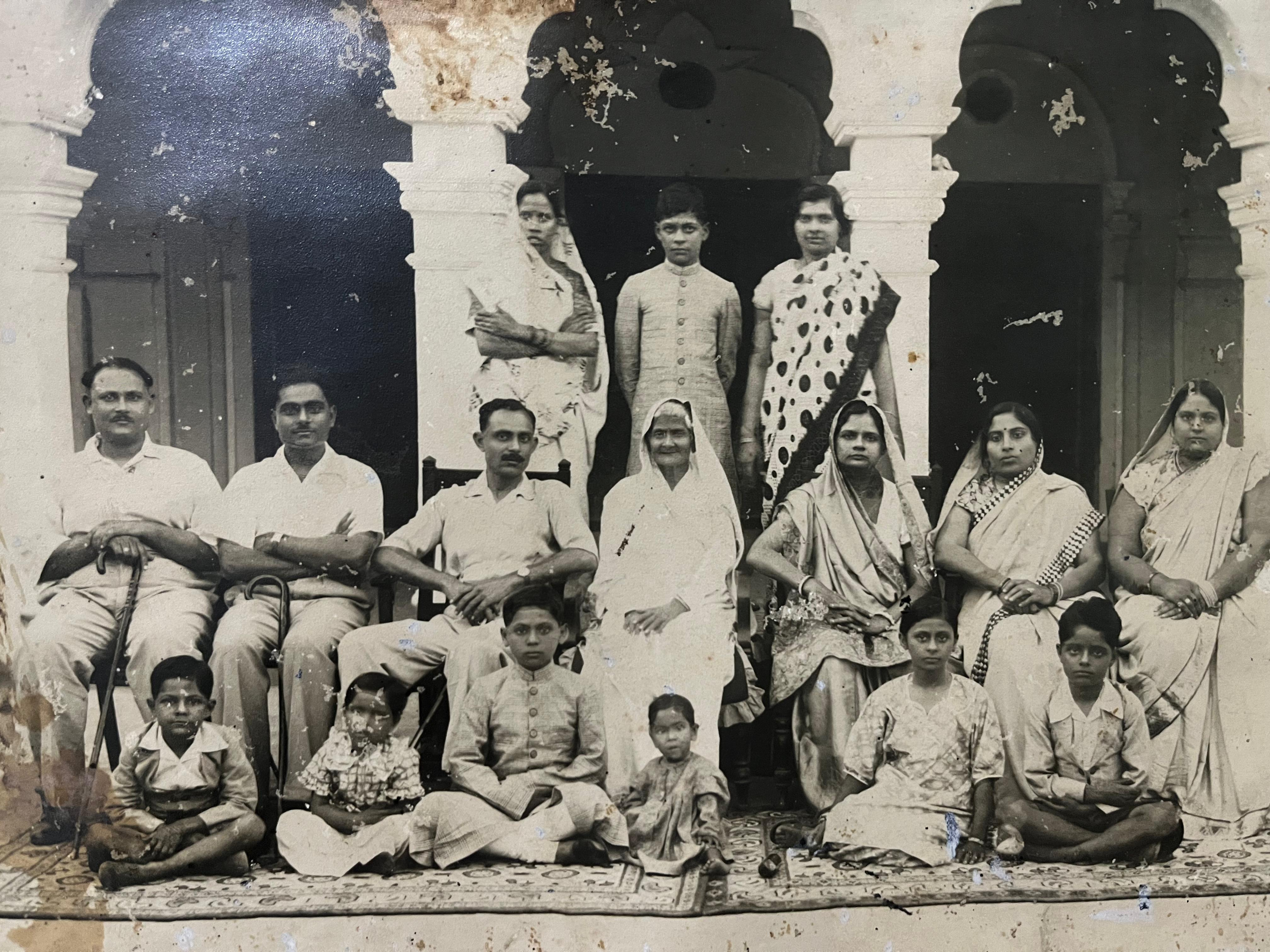
The ruling family, 1870s

== Demographics ==
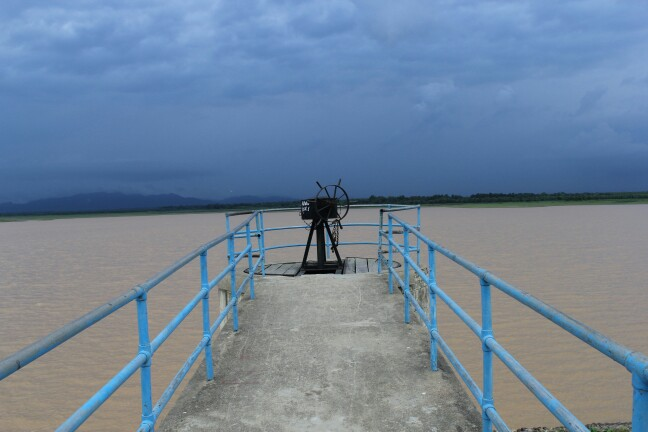
Pili Dam Rehar. By Prashant Sehgal

As of the 2001 Indian census, Rehar had a population of 4,954, of which 53% were male and 47% were female. Rehar had an average literacy rate of 39%, lower than the national average of 59.5%; with 59% of the males and 41% of females literate. 17% of the population is under 6 years.
