= Anam Zakaria =

Pakistani writer, Oral-historian and educator based in Canada

- Education: International Development; Anthropology
- Alma mater: McGill University; University of Toronto
- Occupations: Author, researcher, educationist, oral historian

Anam Zakaria (Urdu: انَم زَكَريا) is a Canada-based Pakistani writer, oral historian and educator. She is the author of the prize-winning book The Footprints of Partition: Narratives of Four Generations of Pakistanis and Indians (2015) and 1971: A People's History from Bangladesh, Pakistan and India (2019).

== Biography ==
Anam Zakaria holds an undergraduate degree in international development from McGill University, and two master's degrees from University of Toronto in anthropology and counselling psychology.

Anam has a sixteen-year career experience in the non-profit sector. She has previously worked as a director at the Citizens Archive of Pakistan. She conducted interviews from the partition generation of Pakistan and was part of the team leading the exchange-for-change program between 2010 and 2013. The program was aimed at building peace among students of Pakistan and India. Anam has also worked in the education and energy sectors at the Association for the Development of Pakistan. She has also taught at Headstart School in Islamabad.

Anam is a freelance journalist and has written articles for CBC, Toronto Star, Scroll, Al-Jazeera, The New York Times, Dawn, The Hill Times and The Wire.

Anam has authored books on South Asian history and conflicts. The Footprints of Partition: Narratives of Four Generations of Pakistanis and Indians (2015) was her first book. Since then, she has published Between the Great Divide: A Journey into Pakistan-Administered Kashmir (2018) and 1971: A People's History from Bangladesh, Pakistan and India (2019). She used her own research, including interviews and museum visits for her third book.

Between 2016 and 2022 she was the Head of Fellowships for the KP Government Innovation Fellowship Program, at Code for Pakistan, where she now serves as Vice President – Fellowships. The program is a partnership between the KP Government, The World Bank and Code for Pakistan.

In Canada, Anam has worked in the settlement sector to support newcomers and refugees and currently works towards inclusive city-building. She is also the co-founder of Qissa, a platform for immigrant storytelling that documents and exhibits oral histories of newcomers and refugees, disrupting the white gaze through which immigrant stories are usually told. Qissa's recent projects include Driving Canada: A front-row seat of immigration through Uber, featuring oral histories with ride-share drivers in the Greater Toronto and Hamilton Area and the annual Qissa Festival which brings together newcomer and refugee writers and artists for panels and performances.

She is married to Pakistani writer Haroon Khalid.

== Awards ==
- Winner: 2017 KLF German Peace Prize for her book The Footprints of Partition.

== Books ==
- The Footprints of Partition: Narratives of Four Generations of Pakistanis and Indians (2015).
- Between the Great Divide: A Journey into Pakistan-Administered Kashmir (2018).
- 1971: A People's History from Bangladesh, Pakistan and India (2019).
