= Mehwish Hayat =

Pakistani actress and singer (born 1988)

Mehwish Hayat TI
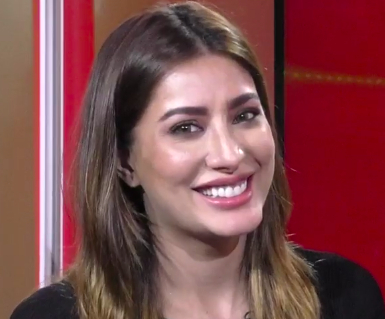
- Hayat at a talk show in 2019
- Born: 6 January 1988 (age 38); Karachi, Sindh, Pakistan
- Education: University of Karachi
- Occupations: Actress; singer
- Years active: 2009–present
- Honours: Tamgha-e-Imtiaz (2019)
- Musical career
- Genre: Pop music
- Instrument: Vocals
- Label: Coke Studio

Mehwish Hayat (born 6 January 1988) is a Pakistani actress who primarily works in Urdu films, and formerly, in television. She made her film debut with the comedy Jawani Phir Nahi Ani (2015) and followed that up with a lead role in Actor in Law (2016). Hayat has since starred in the comedies Punjab Nahi Jaungi (2017), Load Wedding (2018), and London Nahi Jaunga (2022), all of which rank among the highest-grossing Pakistani films.

== Career ==
The 2012 romantic drama series Meray Qatil Meray Dildar marked a significant turning point in Hayat's career, earning her praise and nomination for Best Actress at the Lux Style Awards. She later portraying of a strong headed in Kashif Nisar's acclaim series Kami Reh Gayi (2013). She achieved further success by featuring in four of Momina Duraid's romantic dramas—Phir Chand Pe Dastak (2011), Mirat-ul-Uroos (2012), Ishq Mein Teray (2013), Ru Baru (2014) and Anjum Shahzad's highly successful family drama Kabhi Kabhi (2013). Her last Pakistani television appearance was Nadeem Baig's tragic romance Dil Lagi (2016). In 2022 she had a supporting role in the Marvel Cinematic Universe TV series Ms. Marvel, as the character Aisha, who has to flee India to Pakistan during the 1940s.

Hayat is the recipient of Lux Style Award and was honoured by the Government of Pakistan with the Tamgha-e-Imtiaz in 2019.

In 2024, Hayat made her television comeback with ARY Digital's television film Ijazat, along with Hassan Sheheryar Yasin. In 2025, she made her small screen appearance after 7 years in Geo Entertainment's television series Dayan, along with Ahsan Khan and Hira Mani.

In 2026, Hayat was announced as a judge for the first season of Pakistan's Got Talent, the Pakistani version of the international Got Talent franchise, alongside Ali Zafar and Tabish Hashmi.

== Personal life ==
Hayat was born on 6 January 1988 in Karachi, Sindh, Pakistan. Her mother, Rukhsar Hayat, was a popular television actress during the 1980s, her eldest brother Zeeshan is a singer-composer while her older sister, Afsheen, is a singer as well. Another older brother, Danish Hayat, is an actor and, through him, she's the sister-in-law of Faiza Ashfaq, a model.

== Filmography ==
=== Films ===
Year	Title	Role	Notes	Ref(s)
2014	Na Maloom Afraad	Dancer	Special appearance in song "Billi"	
2015	Jawani Phir Nahi Ani	Marina		
2016	Actor in Law	Meenu Screwala		
2017	Punjab Nahi Jaungi	Amal Dastoor		
2018	Jawani Phir Nahi Ani 2	Marina	Voice cameo	
2018	Load Wedding	Meerab		
2018	3 Bahadur: Rise of the Warriors	Erma (voice)	Animated film	
2019	Chhalawa	Zoya Rafaqat Chaudhary		
2019	Baaji	Gangster Guriya	Special appearance in song "Gangster Guriya"	
2022	London Nahi Jaunga	Sara Tiwana		
2023	Teri Meri Kahaniyaan	Sadaf	Anthology film	
2024	Daghabaaz Dil	Zoya		
2026	Zombeid	Zara		

=== Short films ===
Year	Title	Role	Director	Notes	Ref(s)
2009	Insha'Allah	Sahar	Khurram Mahmood	Short film	
2015	Dho Dala: The Sin Washer	Pari	Iram Parveen Bilal	Short film	

=== Television ===
Year	Title	Role	Network	Director	Notes	Ref(s)
2004	Wujood-e-Laraib	Afshan		Saqib Rizvi	Acting debut	
2009	Massi Aur Malika	Hina		Abid Ali		
2010	Shehr-e-dil Ke Darwazay	Maria		Nadeem Siddiqui		
2010	Thori Si Wafa Chahiye	Mehreen (aka Mehru)	Geo Entertainment	Yasir Nawaz		
2011	Meray Qatil Meray Dildar	Maham	Hum TV	Asim Ali		
2011	Phir Chand Pe Dastak	Mariam	Hum TV	Saife Hassan		
2012	Dil Tou Bhatkay Ga			Haseeb Hassan		
2012	Man Jali	Tooba Wahab		Nadeem Baig		
2012	Mirat-ul-Uroos	Aima	Geo Entertainment	Anjum Shahzad		
2012	Bin Tere	Saman		Angeline Malik		
2012	Main					
2013	Kabhi Kabhi	Ishaal	ARY Digital	Anjum Shahzad		
2013	Ishq Mein Teray	Aiza	Hum TV	Faheem Burney		
2013	Kami Reh Gaee	Laila	PTV Network	Kashif Nisar		
2014	Ru Baru	Seema (Sarmad's mother)	Hum TV	Saife Hassan		
2015	Unsuni	Sadaf	PTV Home	Ehraz Ali Mirza		
2016	Dil Lagi	Anmol	ARY Digital	Nadeem Beyg		
2022	Ms. Marvel	Aisha	Disney+	Various	American debut	
2024	Ijaazat	Leena	ARY Digital	Ahmed Bhatti	Telefilm	
2025	Dayan	Nihaal / Misha	Geo Entertainment	Siraj-ul-Haque	Drama comeback	
2026	Rutba	Shahnaz (aka Sheeli)	ARY Digital	Haseeb Hassan		

=== Web series ===
Year	Title	Role	Director	Ref(s)
2019	Enaaya	Enaaya	Wajahat Rauf	

=== Other appearances ===
Year	Title	Role	Director	Notes	Ref(s)
2013	Kitni Girhain Baaki Hain	Zareena	Angeline Malik		
2013	Hum Sab Umeed Se Hain	Host	Anjum Shahzad		
2026	Pakistan's Got Talent	Judge	—N/a	Reality talent competition	

== Discography ==
- "Pani Barsa"‍—‌Man Jali (2010)
- "Tell Me Why"‍—‌Meri Behan Maya (2011)
- "Har Saans Gawahi Deta Hai"‍—‌Mirat-ul-Uroos (2012)
- "Mujhse Ab Meri Mohabbat Ke Fasanena Kaho"‍—‌Talkhiyaan (2013)
- "Tu Hi Tu" with Shiraz Uppal in 3rd episode of Coke Studio 9 as featured artist (2016)
- "Dil Saab Dil Babu"‍—‌Sitaron Bhari Raat (2019)
- "Chamkeeli" with Abrar-ul-Haq (2019)

== Awards and nominations ==
Year	Nominee / work	Award	Result	Ref
Lux Style Awards
2013	Mere Qatil Mere Dildar	Best TV Actress – Satellite	Nominated	
2013	Mein	Best TV Actress – Terrestrial	Nominated	
2014	Kami Reh Gaee	Best Television Actress – Terrestrial	Won	
2016	Jawani Phir Nahi Ani	Best Actress (Film)	Nominated	
2017	Dil Lagi	Best TV Actress	Nominated	
2017	Actor in Law	Best Actress (Film)	Nominated	
2018	Punjab Nahi Jaungi	Best Actress (Film)	Nominated	
2019	Load Wedding	Best Actress (Film)	Won	
Hum Awards
2013	Mere Qatil Mere Dildar	Best Actress (Drama)	Nominated	
2013	Mere Qatil Mere Dildar	Best Onscreen Couple (Drama)	Nominated	
Hum Style Awards
2016		Most Stylish Actress (Film)	Nominated	
Nigar Awards
2017	Actor in Law	Best Actress (Film)	Nominated	
International Pakistan Prestige Awards
2017	Actor in Law	Best Actress (Film)	Won	
2018	Punjab Nahi Jaungi	Best Actress (Film)	Won	

== See also ==
- List of Pakistani models
- List of Pakistani actresses
