= Nazir Ahmad Dehlvi =

Indian Urdu writer (1831–1912)

Maulvi Deputy Nazir Ahmad
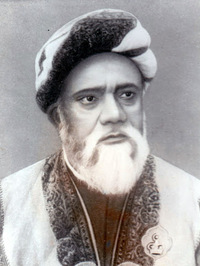
- Deputy Nazir Ahmad
- Born: 6 December 1831; Rehar Village, District Bijnor, Uttar Pradesh, India
- Died: 3 May 1912 (aged 80); Delhi, India
- Resting place: Shah Baqi Billah Cemetery, near New Delhi Railway Station
- Education: Zakir Husain Delhi College (Delhi College)
- Occupation: Novelist
- Writing career
- Pen name: Deputy Nazir Ahmad
- Period: Mughal era, British Indian

Maulvi Nazir Ahmad Dehlvi (6 December 1831 – 3 May 1912), also known as Deputy Nazir Ahmad, was an Urdu novelist, social and religious reformer, and orator. He wrote over 30 books on subjects such as law, logic, ethics and linguistics, as well as novels such as Mirat-ul-Uroos, Tobat-un-Nasuh, and Ibn-ul-waqt. He also translated the Qur’an into Urdu.

== Early life and upbringing ==
Nazir Ahmad was born in 1831 to a family of scholars in Rehar, Bijnor District, U.P., India. His father, Saadat Ali Khan, was a teacher at a madrassa. Until the age of nine, he was home-schooled in Persian and Arabic. He then studied Arabic grammar for five years under the guidance of Deputy Collector Bajnor, Nasrallah Saheb.

To further Ahmad's Arabic skills, in 1842 his father took him to Delhi to study under the guidance of Abd ul-Khaliq at the Aurangabadi Mosque. Ahmad's family was greatly opposed to sending boys to educational institutions running on western lines and urged that education should be confined within the walls of the mosque. However, on a visit to Delhi College, he was offered a scholarship to complete his studies at the college. He took advantage of the opportunity and enrolled in the college in 1846. However, he enrolled in the Urdu section of the college, as his father had said to him, “he would rather see [Ahmad] die than learn English”. From 1846 to 1853 at Delhi College, he studied under Arabic scholar Mamluk Ali Nanautawi and English principal Mr. Taylor, receiving regular education of Arabic literature, philosophy, mathematics and English.

During his time at the mosque at Delhi, Ahmad also discreetly arranged his own marriage to Maulvi Abd ul-Khaliq's granddaughter. Student living in the mosque helped the Maulvi Sahab with daily chores. Ahmad had to carry in his lap a little girl, who became his wife as he grew up, as his teacher was fond of his hard-working habits and good character. He had one son and two daughters from the marriage. His son, Bashiruddin Ahmad Dehlvi, was a high-ranking official, whose own son, Shahid Ahmed Dehlvi, was a famous writer in Pakistan.

== Life after Delhi College ==
Upon completion of his education, in 1853, Ahmad joined the British colonial administration. He began his life as a school teacher, teaching Arabic in a small school at Kunjah, in Gujrat District, in Punjab. After serving two years in Kunjah, he was appointed as deputy inspector of schools in Cawnpore, but his work there was affected by the mutiny of 1857. At the outbreak of the mutiny, he rejoined his family back in Delhi.

Over time, his English improved enough that he could translate English text into Urdu. His acumen at translation was tested for the first time when, at the request of Lieutenant Governor Sir William Muir of the North-Western Provinces, Ahmad translated the Income Tax Act from English to Urdu. Later, a board was convened to carry out the translation of the Indian penal code to Urdu. Ahmad was an important member of the board and carried out a chunk of the translation himself.

In recognition for his hard work and ability, the colonial government decided to give him an appointment in the revenue department, in which he first worked as a Tehsildar, and then in 1863, as a Deputy Collector.

Ahmad garnered more acclaim from his story books. As his daughters were growing up, he realized that there were no good Urdu books focused on the education of girls. He began writing a story for his daughters. The way he in ‘true to life’ manner described the ‘house of the family’ and the ‘talks between the members of the family’ captured the fascination of his girls. The girls kept pressing him to write more and more of the story. The fame of his stories spread in the neighborhood, and copies of the manuscripts were made and other girls read on their own. Nazir Ahmad wrote reformative novels. He laid special emphasis on the education of girls as well as on training them in handling domestic affairs.

Initially, Ahmad wrote without any thought of publication, and his writings were initially limited to a small social circle. Mathew Kempson, the British Director of Public Instruction, discovered the stories during his visit to Jhansi where Ahmad was serving, which led to book being published under the name Mirat-ul-Urus, “Bride’s Mirror”, in 1869.

Mirat ul Urus won huge acclaim upon being published. When Sir William Muir, who knew Ahmad from before, saw the book, he was greatly impressed by it. Two months after Kempson's visit to Jhansi, where he came across Ahmad's writing, he sent Ahmad a letter telling how his book was ‘first of its kind’ and was awarded a cash prize of 1000 rupees. At a Darbar held in Agra in 1869, Sir Williams publicly praised the book. He also gave the author a clock as personal present with the author's name inscribed on it.

== Life after retirement ==
On his return to Delhi, Ahmad undertook the task of translating the Quran to Urdu. He devoted three years to this task with assistance from four hired Maulvis. He translated it into idiomatic Urdu to enable Urdu speaking people to understand the content better. He also included parenthetical phrases in the translation to make the meaning of the text more clear. This translation brought more fame to Ahmad than any of his earlier publications.

Towards the later part of his stay in the city, Ahmad ceased to write fiction and got more involved in Sir Syed's political activities. In these political campaigns, he explored oration. He made his first public speech at the annual meeting of Tibbia College in Delhi. Sheik Abdul Qadir noted this as the likely point where he realized "his tongue could wield a greater influence than his pen" in stirring the masses. The demand of his eloquent speeches made him to travel to Calcutta, Madras and Bombay. Aligarh and Lahore were also his frequent stops. He made the most speeches at the annual meetings of Mohammadan Educational Conferences. The Anjuman-i-Himayat Islam of Lahore invited him for their annual anniversary meetings, and his lecture of sideline of the gathering attracted throngs of crowds. With his commendable sense of humor and eloquent recitation of verses, he could hold his audience ‘spell bound for two to three hours in a stretch’.

Despite holding a post in the British government, Ahmad still preferred the traditional Indian lifestyle, rather than the more anglicized modern British lifestyle.

== List of works ==
=== Novels ===
Urdu title	English translation	Date	Description	Ref
Mirat-ul-Uroos	the Bride’s mirror	1869	This is the first novel written by Ahmad and it is also the first novel of Urdu literature. It is the story of two sisters, Asghari and Akbari. Asghari was younger sister and she was really intelligent, doing every thing with wisdom and intelligence. Akbari was a foolish girl, losing much because of her foolishness. Through this novel Ahmad tried to raise consciousness in girls about the discipline of house keeping.	
Binat-un-Nash	the Daughter of the bier		The novel had ‘Asghari’ from Mirat-ul-Uroos as the chief character, although here Asghari is a school teacher. The idea of female education is a core theme of this books. That is done by giving lessons in general education and physical sciences through conversations between a teacher and her student. This publishing was also a great success. This was the time when Ahmad's writings became a mode of guidance for the girls of Mohammadan families.	
Toba tun Nasoh	Sincere Repentance	1873	It is a story of a ‘penitent sinner’, who fighting cholera out of hopelessness, turns himself to the right path of God. His wife embraces the change in her husband. However, his children, especially the eldest son, have indulged into irretractable bad manners. The author talks about how the former habits of the father led to the eldest son's being spoiled. Nazir through his story highlights the importance of grooming and disciplining kids as they are growing up. Simultaneously, he stresses on the youth to heed the advice of their elders.	
Ibn ul Waqt		1888	It describes the difficulties of a man who grew up in an old fashioned home but adopted a Western style of living and proved misfit.	
Muhsinat (Fasana e Mubtala)		1885	Story of an unfortunate man who marries two wives and suffers constant friction at home.	
Ayama		1891	It stresses on the remarriage of widows.	
Mauzia-e-Hasana			It's the collection of letters he wrote to his son.	
Ummahat-ul-Ummah	Mother of the faithful			
Roya e Sadiqa		1892		

=== Translations ===
Some of the translated titles include:

- Tarjuma-i Qur’an, 1896 - Urdu translation of the Quran
