= Irsa Ghazal =

Pakistani television actress

- Occupation: Actor
- Years active: 1988–present
- Relatives: Ushna Shah (half-sister) Syeda Ismat Tahira (Mother)

Irsa Ghazal is a Pakistani television actress known for her roles in television serials such as Mirat-ul-Uroos (1988), Ullu Baraye Farokht Nahi (2013), Yeh Mera Deewanapan Hai (2015), O Rangreza (2017), Aangan (2018), Ishq Jalebi (2021), Mannat Murad (2023), and Aye Ishq E Junoon (2024)

== Personal life ==
Ghazal is the daughter of former actress Syeda Ismat Tahira. Her half-sister Ushna Shah is also an actress.

== Career ==
Ghazal made her acting debut from PTV's Mirat-ul-Uroos in 1988. Then, she appeared in television serials such as Samjhauta Express, Ullu Baraye Farokht Nahi and Kahi Unkahi, the second one of which earned her nomination of Lux Style Award for Best TV Actress. She further appeared in television serials such as O Rangreza, Aangan, Ruswai and Ishq Jalebi. From 2023 to 2024, she played Razia Sultana, a dominant matriarch in Mannat Murad, and received praise for her portrayal.

== Filmography ==
=== Television ===
Year	Title	Role	Network	Ref(s)
1988	Mirat-ul-Uroos	Akbari		
1989	Pyas	Jeeran	PTV	
1989	Neelay Hath	Rano	PTV	
2010	Samjhauta Express	Pragya Singh Sadhvi	PTV	
2012	Kahi Unkahi	Saira	Hum TV	
2013	Ullu Baraye Farokht Nahi	Aapa Bee	Hum TV	
2013–2014	Rishtay Kuch Adhooray Se	Gaeti Ara's mother	Hum TV	
2014	Shikwa	Munazza	ARY Digital	
2015	Mumkin	Mehreen	ARY Digital	
2015	Farwa Ki ABC	Farwa's mother	A-Plus TV	
2015	Khatoon Manzil	Nighat	ARY Digital	
2015	Yeh Mera Deewanapan Hai	Attiya	A-Plus TV	
2016	Khuda Mera Bhi Hai	Arshi	ARY Digital	
2016	Moray Saiyaan	Zakia	ARY Digital	
2017	Andaaz-e-Sitam	Begum Nawazish	Urdu 1	
2017	O Rangreza	Mumtaz nicknamed Mummo	Hum TV	
2017	Aangan	Hajra	ARY Digital	
2017	Aadat	Neelum	TV One	
2018	Dil-e-Bereham	Aaira	A-Plus TV	
2019	Barfi Laddu	Naila Sheikh	ARY Digital	
2019	Ruswai	Salma	ARY Digital	
2021	Ishq Jalebi	Sajeela (Sajjo)	Geo Entertainment	
2022	Chaudhry and Sons	Malika Dadi	Geo Entertainment	
2022	Habs	Sadia	ARY Digital	
2023	Kuch Ankahi	Shammo Begum	ARY Digital	
2023–2024	Mannat Murad	Razia Sultana	Geo Entertainment	
2024–2025	Aye Ishq-e-Junoon	Afiya Ali Nawaz (nee Kamal)	Geo Entertainment	
2026	Rutba		ARY Digital	

== Awards and nominations ==
Year	Awards	Category	Work	Result	Ref(s).
2014	Lux Style Award	Best Television Actress - Terrestrial	Ullu Baraye Farokht Nahi	Nominated	
