= Talat Siddiqui =

Pakistani actress

- طلعت صدیقی
- Born: Adeeba Nazeer; 18 February 1939; Shimla, Punjab, British India
- Died: 9 May 2021 (aged 82); Lahore, Punjab, Pakistan
- Education: Shimla School
- Occupations: Actress; Singer
- Years active: 1956 – 2010
- Spouse: Bashir Ahmed Siddiqui (m. 1954; died 1970)
- Children: Nahid Siddiqui (daughter); Arifa Siddiqui (daughter)
- Parent: Nazir Ahmad (father)
- Relatives: Rehana Siddiqui (sister); Fariha Pervez (niece)

Adeeba Nazeer, also known as Talat Siddiqui (18 February 1939 - 9 May 2021), was a Pakistani actress and singer. She acted in both Urdu and Punjabi films and is known for her roles in the films Ishq-e-Habib (1965), Kon Kisi Ka (1966), Lori (1966), Yaar Maar (1967), Chacha Ji (1967), Behan Bhai (1968), Ladla (1969), Andaleeb (1969), Umrao Jan Ada (1972), and Baghi Tay Farangi (1976).

== Early life ==
Adeeba Nazeer was born in 1939 in Shimla, Punjab, British India. She was the eldest of her siblings. She completed her studies (FA) in her hometown. Talat's father, named Nazir Ahmad, was a government servant.

== Career ==
She and her husband migrated to Pakistan and started living in Karachi. After a short while, her husband got imprisoned in a court case. To take care of her child (Nahid Siddiqui) and run the household, she auditioned at Radio Pakistan. After some time, she became known as Talat Siddiqui. She did playback singing in some films, and later she acted in films Ishq-e-Habib, Tasvir, Aarzoo, Dard-e-Dil, and Phir Subah Ho Gi. She also appeared in films Doraha, Main Woh Nahin, Jani Dushman, Mera Veer, Ik Si Maa, and Panchhi Tay Pardesi. Talat also worked in many dramas on PTV, including Dehleez, Kahan Hai Manzil, Zarb Gulab, Hisaar, Waris, and Dhund Kay Uss Par.

== Personal life ==
Her father was a chronic asthma patient, and being unable to take on her responsibilities anymore, got her married to Bashir Ahmed Siddiqui, at the age of 15. She had four children, including two daughters; Arifa Siddiqui (a famous Pakistani actress and singer of the 80s and 90s) and Nahid Siddiqui (an internationally renowned Kathak dancer). Talat's younger sister Rehana Siddiqui was also an actress. Fariha Pervez, a famous Pakistani singer, is her niece.

== Illness and death ==
She contracted a prolonged illness and was put on a ventilator towards the end of her life, but her condition worsened, and she died on 9 May 2021, at the age of 82. She was laid to rest in the Canal View Society graveyard in Lahore.

== Filmography ==
=== Television ===
Year	Title	Role	Network
1979	Waris	Dilawar's mother	PTV
1981	Kahan Hai Manzil	Ruqayya	PTV
1981	Dehleez	Ammi Begum	PTV
1982	Sona Chandi	Begum Abbas Ali	PTV
1982	Zard Gulab	Old lady	PTV
1984	Andhera Ujala	Tahir's mother	PTV
1986	Aik Din Raat	Naheed's mother	PTV
1987	Dhund Kay Uss Par	Hina's mother	PTV
1988	Do Dhari Talvar	Saima's mother	PTV
1989	Hisaar	Rasheeda	PTV
1989	Fehmida Ki Kahani Ustani Rahat Ki Zubani	Bari Ammi	PTV
1989	Neelay Hath	Sakeena's mother	PTV
1993	Yes Sir, No Sir	Herself	PTV
1994	Aik Din - Saboot	Ali's aunt	PTV

=== Film ===
Year	Film	Language
1963	Hamen Bhi Jeenay Do	Urdu
1964	Mehkhana	Urdu
1964	Heera Aur Pathar	Urdu
1964	Chhoti Behan	Urdu
1965	Ishq-e-Habib	Urdu
1965	Aarzoo	Urdu
1966	Tasvir	Urdu
1966	Moajza	Urdu
1966	Kon Kisi Ka	Urdu
1966	Lori	Urdu
1966	Dard-e-Dil	Urdu
1967	Yaar Maar	Punjabi
1967	Main Woh Nahin	Urdu
1967	Meray Laal	Urdu
1967	Chacha Ji	Punjabi
1967	Hukumat	Urdu
1967	Doraha	Urdu
1967	Phir Subah Ho Gi	Urdu
1967	Mera Veer	Punjabi
1967	Maa Baap	Urdu
1967	Jani Dushman	Punjabi
1967	Hamdam	Urdu
1968	Behan Bhai	Urdu
1968	Ik Si Maa	Punjabi
1968	Commander	Urdu
1968	Beti Beta	Urdu
1968	Chann 14vin Da	Punjabi
1969	Shaheed Teetu Mir	Urdu
1969	Pyar Da Palla	Punjabi
1969	Panchhi Tay Pardesi	Punjabi
1969	Piya Millan Ki Aas	Urdu
1969	Ghar Damaad	Urdu
1969	Aneela	Urdu
1969	Ladla	Urdu
1969	Andaleeb	Urdu
1969	Naaz	Urdu
1969	Geo Dhola	Punjabi
1971	Jatt Da Qoul	Punjabi
1971	Sohna Puttar	Punjabi
1972	Eid Da Chann	Punjabi
1972	Insan Ik Tamasha	Punjabi
1972	Umrao Jan Ada	Urdu
1973	Aan	Punjabi
1973	Aar Par	Urdu
1973	Khoon Da Badla Khoon	Punjabi
1973	Jithay Wagdi A Ravi	Punjabi
1973	Professor	Urdu
1974	Tiger Gang	Urdu
1974	Sohna Daku	Punjabi
1975	Heera Phumman	Punjabi
1975	Dil Nasheen	Urdu
1975	Palki	Urdu
1975	Sar-e-Aam	Punjabi
1975	Gunahgar	Punjabi
1976	Baghi Tay Farangi	Punjabi
1976	Akh Lari Bado Badi	Punjabi
1976	Dharkan	Urdu
1978	Ek Chehra 2 Roop	Urdu
1978	Aadmi	Urdu
1978	Sharmili	Urdu
1979	Qatil Tay Farishta	Punjabi
1981	Amanat	Punjabi
1982	Haidar Sultan	Punjabi
1982	Sangdil	Urdu
1983	Aakhri Muqabila	Punjabi
1984	Dulla Bhatti	Punjabi
1984	Kalia	Punjabi
1984	Dil Maa Da	Punjabi
1985	Nikah	Punjabi
1985	Qismat	Punjabi
1985	Naraz	Urdu
1986	Riksha Driver	Punjabi
1987	Son of Ann Daata	Urdu
1987	Teri Banhon Mein	Urdu
1989	Aakhri Qatal	Punjabi
