= Nahid Siddiqui =

Pakistani Kathak dancer

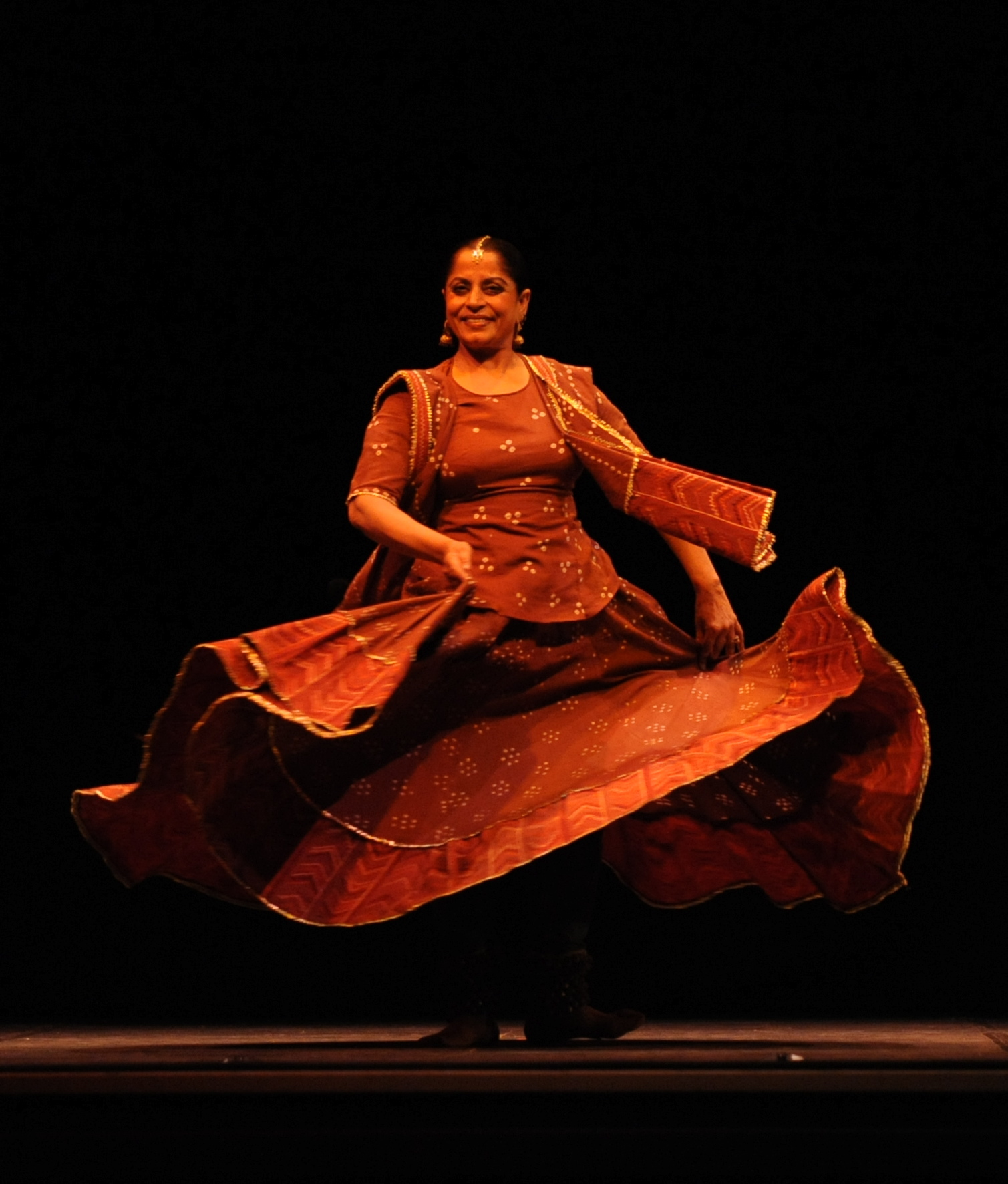
- Born: 1956 (age 69–70); Rawalpindi, Punjab, Pakistan
- Education: University of Home Economics; Happy Home School
- Occupations: Kathak choreographer, dancer
- Years active: 1970s – present
- Organizations: Nahid Siddiqui Foundation
- Parent: Talat Siddiqui (mother)
- Relatives: Arifa Siddiqui (sister); Fariha Pervez (cousin); Rehana Siddiqui (aunt)
- Awards: Pride of Performance (Pakistan) (1994); Lux Style Award (Lifetime Achievement Award) (2018)
- Website: nahidsiddiqui.com

Nahid Siddiqui (born 1956) is a Pakistani dancer and exponent of Kathak. She studied under Maharaj Kathak in Pakistan and Birju Maharaj in India. Scholars have identified her style as incorporating Islamic and Sufi aesthetic influences. She has performed at major venues, festivals, and on television internationally.

She has been the recipient of several awards, including Pakistan’s Pride of Performance, the UK’s British Cultural Award, and the International Dance Award. She is the main character of the spiritual novel Sitaron Bhari Raat ('The Starry Night'), by Canadian-Pakistani writer Waseem Raza Syed.

== Early life ==
Nahid was born in Rawalpindi, Pakistan in 1956. She is the eldest daughter of actor Talat Siddiqui and Mohammad Bashir Siddiqui. At the age of 3, she moved to Karachi with her parents. Her parents enrolled her in Happy Home School, Karachi. In the late 1960s, she moved to Lahore with her parents and joined the University of Home Economics, known at the time as Home Economics College.

== Life and Works ==
=== Education ===
It was under the tutelage of the distinguished teacher Baba Maharaj, and later, Pandit Birju Maharaj, that Nahid Siddiqui, embarked on a journey to delve deep into Kathak, becoming the only Pakistani to extensively explore the physical and theoretical nuances of this ancient dance form. Nahid started learning Kathak from Baba Maharaj Ghulam Hussain Kathak in 1971.

In 1976, Nahid Siddiqui had the honor to travel with the entourage of former Prime Minister Zulfiqar Ali Bhutto and represent Pakistan as a Kathak dancer, embarking on a journey that would make her strive to root and evolve Kathak in Pakistan. She has performed in the United States, Canada, Germany, Italy, Morocco, and Jordan and has performed for audiences that have often comprised international dignitaries. Some of them were the Late Shah of Iran and Khanum Farah Diba, Chancellor Schmidt of West Germany, Prime Minister Pierre Trudeau of Canada, King Hussein of Jordan, and King Zahir Shah of Afghanistan.

Payal, a dynamic thirteen-episode visual encyclopedia, aired in 1978, to date remains the only such endeavor in Pakistan in which Nahid Siddiqui collaborated with classical musicians, creating a masterpiece, which shed light on Kathak in a society where there was very little awareness of this art. Payal, however, was banned and taken off air by the military regime after its sixth episode was aired on TV. Nahid Siddiqui has since been symbolic of resistance against extremist ideologies, beautifully using her art to exemplify Islamic culture in a way not seen before. This production is now viewed and studied by ardent Kathak dancers around the world.

== Life in England ==
In England, where she lived in exile, Nahid Siddiqui inculcated the paradigms of Islamic geometry, Sufi poetry, Persian, Arab and Turkic influences in Kathak. Through the in-depth understanding of Islamic geometry, Nahid Siddiqui has greatly enhanced the visual vocabulary of Kathak by striving to find the perfect posture and body alignment to paint evocative lines and compositions. She is one of the very few Kathak dancers' who is renowned for her finesse and immense sophistication in movement. While in England, she provided her students a different perspective of Kathak, which was and is still not being explored in India. In England, she became the first Pakistani to teach at the Bharatiya Vidya Bhavan, (Indian Cultural Centre). She began her teaching career at the Midlands Arts Centre, Birmingham. She launched her dance company and since then has continued to produce professional dancers, some of whom have gone on launch their own companies in England and around the world. Those worth mentions include Late Jahanara Akhlaq, Sonia Kundi, and Simmi Gupta. It is noteworthy to mention that while she was teaching dance in England, she received patronage from the Art Council from 1990 onwards and trained many dancers of western descent. In times of violence, in a country facing an identity crisis, where ancient cultural teachings have been left to decay, she revisited her roots in Pakistan to do her bidding. By showing young Pakistanis the beauty of the ancient arts in a modern and free environment, she gives nourishment to a true culture of the East. Unlike general Kathak endeavors in Pakistan, her technique has a proper curriculum, which in its physical aspect is as strict as ballet. Nahid Siddiqui has been holding lecture demonstrations and workshops in Pakistan. Since 2005, she has taught Kathak at the privately run Lahore Chitrakar and in the department of Musicology at the National College of Arts, Lahore. She has also worked extensively with the prestigious Agha Khan University in Karachi and held workshops there. She continues to live in Lahore, Pakistan and keeps dance alive by holding routine performances for the young audience. She is running her own organization named Nahid Siddiqui Foundation, which works for Dance, Yoga, and Music.

== Awards & Achievements ==
- Pride of Performance (1994)
- Time Out Award (1991)
- The Digital Award
- British Cultural Award
- International Dance Award
- Faiz Ahmed Faiz Award
- Dance Umbrella Award
- Lux Style Award (Lifetime Achievement Award)
- National Indian Arts Award (Life Time Achievement Award)
