= Rehana Siddiqui =

Pakistani actress

- ریحانہ صدیقی
- Born: Rehana Nazir; 28 February 1946; Shimla, Punjab, British India
- Died: 24 July 2021 (aged 75); Blackburn, England, United Kingdom
- Occupations: Actress; Writer; Radio artist
- Years active: 1962 – 2012
- Spouse: Aurangzeb (divorced)
- Children: 2
- Parent: Nazir Ahmed (father)
- Relatives: Talat Siddiqui (sister); Arifa Siddiqui (niece); Nahid Siddiqui (niece); Fariha Pervez (niece)
- Awards: Pride of Performance (2009)

Rehana Siddiqui (Punjabi, Urdu: ریحانہ صدیقی) was a Pakistani film, television and theatre actress. She was known for her roles in dramas Khawab Azab, Zameen, Fasad Ki Jar, Takmeel, Manchalay Ka Sauda, Saat Bhiraie, Teen Bata Teen, Ghareeb-e-Shehar and Barson Baad.

== Early life ==
She was born in 1946 in Shimla, Punjab, British India. Her father, Nazir Ahmed, was a government employee.

== Career ==
Rehana started working at Radio Pakistan in 1962 and before joining Radio she used to write short stories for newspaper and magazines, using her pen name Rehana Zeerat. She made her debut as an actress in 1964 when PTV was newly established, and was noted for her roles in dramas Fasad Ki Jar, Shama Har Rang Main Jalti Hai, Zameen, Kuch To Kaho, Sat Bhiraie, Takmeel, Dastak Aur Darwaza and Kallo. She also appeared in dramas Saat Bhiraie, Aadhi Roti Aik Langoti, Gohra Ghaas Khaata Hai and Tanha, and did theatre and stage plays at Lahore. She also worked in Urdu and Punjabi films and appeared in films Bahu Rani, Aanch, Hamdam, Agg Tay Khoon and Mohabbat Rang Laye Gi. For her contributions towards the Radio, Television and Film industry, she was honored by the Government of Pakistan with the Pride of Performance in 2009.

Later in late 2012 she retired and went to live with one of her daughters at Blackburn at United Kingdom.

== Personal life ==
She married film actor Aurangzeb but later they divorced and she took the custody of her two daughters. Her elder sister Talat Siddiqui was also an actress and singer. Rehana's nieces Fariha Pervez and Arifa Siddiqui are both singers and Nahid Siddiqui is a famous dancer.

== Illness and death ==
She contracted a prolonged illness from which she died in Blackburn, United Kingdom at age 75.

== Awards and recognition ==
She was honored by the Government of Pakistan with the Pride of Performance in 2009.

== Filmography ==
=== Television ===
Year	Title	Role	Network
1965	Aadhi Roti Aik Langoti	Rani	PTV
1966	Shama Har Rang Main Jalti Hai	Shama	PTV
1968	Kuch To Kaho	Shameen	PTV
1969	Ghora Ghaas Khaata Hai	Humna	PTV
1992	Khawab Azab	Asma's mother	STN
1992	Sofia	Parveen	PTV
1993	Zameen	Sanwal's sister	PTV
1994	Takmeel	Ferozan	PTV
1994	Alhamdulillah	Zeb-un-nisa	PTV
1994	Machalay Ka Sauda	Mala Begum	PTV
1994	Sat Bhiraie	Naik Khatoon	PTV
1994	Al-Hamd-u-lillah	Zaib-un-nisa	PTV
1995	Kallo	Sajid's mother	PTV
1995	Dastak Aur Darwaza	Bua	PTV
1995	Teen Bata Teen	Masi	PTV
1995	Red Card	Noman's mother	STN
1997	Ghar Se Ghar	Noor-un-Nisa	PTV
1998	Larki Ek Sharmili Si	Tai	STN
1999	Girah	Nani	PTV
1999	Fasad Ki Jar	Dadi	PTV
1999	Ghareeb-e-Shehar	Zohra	PTV
2000	Us Paar	Begum Sahiba	PTV
2000	Bandhan	Aslam's mother	PTV
2001	Saas Bhi Aik Maa Hai	Amna Begum	PTV
2004	Aag	Paaro	PTV
2004	Shahla Kot	Nadira	PTV
2004	Amavas Ki Raat	Girja Devi	PTV
2006	Barson Baad	Rabia	PTV
2006	Ikhtiar Tay Etbaar	Masi Barkatay	PTV
2007	Junoo Mein Jitni Bhi Guzri	Sakina	PTV
2007	Delhi Kay Bankay	Surayya	A-Plus
2012	Tanha	Begum Shahab	PTV

=== Film ===
Year	Film	Language
1967	Hamdam	Urdu
1969	Aanch	Urdu
1969	Bahu Rani	Urdu
1969	Salgira	Urdu
1970	Be Wafa	Urdu
1970	Mohabbat Rang Laye Gi	Urdu
1972	Ek Raat	Urdu
1975	Agg Tay Khoon	Punjabi
1975	Baghi	Pashto
1977	Mohabbat Mar Nahin Sakti	Urdu

=== Other appearance ===
Year	Title	Role	Network
1997	Tum Jo Chaho Tu Suno	Herself	PTV

== Awards and recognition ==
Year	Award	Category	Result	Title	Ref.
2009	Pride of Performance	Award by the President of Pakistan	Won	Herself	
