= Samundar (TV series) =

- Title screen
- Created by: Amjad Islam Amjad
- Directed by: Yawar Hayat Khan and Qasim Jalali
- Starring: Abid Ali; Mehboob Alam; Bindiya; Asif Raza Mir; Waseem Abbas; Nighat Butt; Khursheed Shahid; Arifa Siddiqui; Sarwat Ateeq; Shakila Qureshi; Sehrish Khan; Tauqeer Nasir; Nisar Qadri; Mehmood Aslam
- Country of origin: Pakistan
- No. of episodes: 18

Production
- Running time: 56 - 60 min

Original release
- Network: PTV.
- Release: 1983

Samundar (transl. Ocean) is a 1983 Pakistani television series presented by the PTV network. It was broadcast from the PTV Lahore center and was directed by Yawar Hayat and Qasim Jalali; Amjad Islam Amjad wrote the script. The series is one of the most famous ones from PTV. It is remembered to this day due to its unique storyline and star cast.

== Characters and cast ==
The noun "Samundar" is Amjad Islam Amjad's metaphorical reference to the world that surrounds us all. An Abyss full of unique human characteristics, frailties and triumphant human spirit. The Drama tells the story of five unique friends bonded together by friendship and a common purpose in a business partnership. Their lives are essentially torn apart by greed, lust for wealth, impulsive power, scandalous ambition and lack of morals. The five friends also display a unique set of characteristics, personifying individuality and a unique perspective on life.

Mehboob Alam as Shabaz Khan: is a feudal lord who descends from the centuries-old socioeconomically stagnant and yet dominant Agrarian Indo-Asian culture. He represents all that is historically wrong with the systemic Feudal landownership system. He is a tenacious blowhard, power-mongering, aggressive proto-businessman. He uses any means necessary to force and maintain his egotistical control over the world that surrounds him. He is the dominant of the 5 partners, more solemn and decisive in action and believes in short term solutions.
Nisar Qadri as Qadeer: A meager and yet shrewd salvage business owner who brings to the partnership table a cunning extra sense, a worldly practical perspective, self-serving impulse, diabolical survival instinct, and a hobby and knack for knowing a variety of exotic poisons. He is pragmatic and relies heavily on using lingual metaphors to memorize any listener. He is also astute negotiator and possess a skillful art of measurements and assessment.
Irfan Khoosat as Ibrahim: is a self-absorbed, passive, surreptitious, petty and incredulous large person. He brings to the business partnership almost entirely an ebb of fellowship, although he can turn on a dime with absolute vengeance and surmounting hunger for gains.
Bindiya as Nosheen: The effervescent socially gifted strong-minded feminist first born of Khan Shabaz Khan. She carries a soft caring interior over a hard tenacious defensive shell. She represents the clan's Feudal hegemonic powerful facade. She is feisty, flirtatious and holds no grudges.
Asif Raza Mir as Nasir: The prodigal eldest son of "Baqar", one of the FIVE partners. An idealist and a progressive thinker and a graduating medical doctor. He aspires to change the centuries-old traditionalism, although nearly always confines himself to a traditional upbringing as the "good son".
Waseem Abbas as Yasir: The central character in this play. The younger of the Baqar's boys who happens to kick off this titillating and suspenseful drama when he is Bailed out by Ahmed Kamal, only to find himself working for him in efforts to avenge his father's murderers.
Arifa Siddiqui as Sidra: a happy go lucky girl for whom fate has something else in store
Sarwat Ateeq as Jeeran: who has hidden a dark secret in her heart for so many years
Tauqeer Nasir as Tanveer: who can go to any extent to take revenge
Mohammad Zubair as Mehroz: a wealthy boy
Abid Kashmiri Gullu: a rickshaw driver with a heart of gold
Sehrish Khan as Sumaira: a friendly person and is unaware of her past
Shakila Qureshi as Tabbasum : is a kind person and for whom life is a burden
Mehmood Aslam as Najeeb: a spoilt student and uses his father's position and money to destroy others
Nighat Butt as Qamar-un-Nisa: an evil woman who destroyed the lives of several girls for her own advantage
Khursheed Shahid as Nasir and Yasir's mother: a kind mother who wants to see her children happy
Poonam as Tehseen: a practical and caring young woman
Abid Ali as Zaman: is related in some way to all these characters and plays an important part in everyone's life
