= Barson Baad =

- Title screen
- Genre: Television Drama Serial
- Written by: Nasir Jaffri
- Directed by: Syed Faisal Bukhari
- Creative director: Sohail Khan
- Starring: Jawed Sheikh; Shabbir Jan; Khayyam Sarhadi; Ahsan Khan; Fareeda Shabbir; Kashif Mehmood; Rehana Siddiqui; Darakshan Tahir; Narjis Amir; Hamda Raheel; Eva Majid and Zaigham Jaffri
- Theme music composer: Wajid Ali Nashad
- Opening theme: Barson Baad by Ameer Ali
- Composers: Wajid Ali Nashad and Syed Anser
- Country of origin: Pakistan
- Original language: Urdu
- No. of seasons: 1

Production
- Executive producer: Safdar Jaffri
- Producer: Syed Nasir Jaffri
- Production location: Pakistan Scotland
- Editor: Majid Cheema

Original release
- Network: PTV
- Release: 2005 – 2006

Barson Baad (Urdu: برسوں بعد, lit. 'Years later') is a Pakistani television drama broadcast by PTV in 2005. The series was written by Nasir Jaffri, scripted by Salman Wajih Hassan, and directed by Syed Faisal Bukhari. It was filmed on location in Pakistan and Scotland.

== Plot ==
Barson Baad is a story of two brothers who live in Scotland.

== Cast ==
- Jawed Sheikh
- Shabbir Jan
- Khayyam Sarhadi
- Ahsan Khan
- Fareeda Shabbir
- Kashif Mehmood
- Narjis Amir
- Hamda Raheel
- Darakshan Tahir
- Rehana Siddiqui
- Eva Majid
- Zaigham Jaffri

Production crew

- Salman Wajih Hassan (screenplay)
- Syed Nasir Jaffri (producer)(writer)
- Syed Faisal Bukhari (director)
- Wajid Ali Nashad (Music)
- waris baig (Singer)
- Mumtaz Khan
