= Yawar Hayat Khan =

Pakistani TV producer and director (1943-2016)

- Born: 18 October 1943; Lahore, Punjab, British India
- Died: 3 November 2016 (aged 73); Lahore, Punjab, Pakistan
- Occupations: Producer, Director of TV dramas at Pakistan Television Corporation
- Years active: 1965-2004 (retired in 2004)

Yawar Hayat Khan (18 October 1943 – 3 November 2016), was a producer and director of the Pakistan Television (PTV) starting from 1965 to 2004. He is considered one of the chief architects of PTV drama serials in its early years after television was introduced in Pakistan in 1964.

== Early life ==
Yawar Hayat Khan was born in Lahore, on 18 October 1943, the eldest son of Brigadier Azmat Hayat Khan and grandson of Sir Sikandar Hayat Khan, the Punjabi Khattar aristocrat and statesman. From his mother's side he was the nephew of Anwar Kamal Pasha, a famed early film director of Pakistan and a grandson of the famous Urdu poet and writer, Hakim Ahmad Shuja. He was initially educated at the Aitchison College, and then went on for his Bachelor of Arts degree to the Forman Christian College.

== Creative work ==
Yawar Hayat Khan started his television career at Pakistan Television Corporation in 1965. As a young producer-director, he directed the immensely popular rural folk drama Jhok Siyaal (1973), based on a work written earlier by Syed Shabbir Hussain Shah, the Punjabi writer (husband of the classical singer Malika Pukhraj and father of Ghazal singer Tahira Syed). This was followed by serials such as Samundar , Nasheman, Dehleez, Sahil, Gumshuda and others, during the 1980s and 1990s. He retired in 2004.

The influence of British film director Sir David Lean is often visible on Khan's work, especially his epic, panoramic shots of natural scenes.

In a TV interview, Yawar Hayat also compared some of his work to the writings of the American writer William Faulkner, stating that he also created 'highly cerebral' and 'complex' works, that often reflected the lives of feudal aristocrats in their declining years, at odds with a changing society; as well as a diversity of rural and urban poor engaged in a 'harsh and sometimes grotesque struggle' for existence. Veteran TV actor Behroze Sabzwari gives a lot of credit to Yawar Hayat Khan for the high quality TV dramas produced on Pakistan Television Corporation. Late Professor Jilani Kamran, a famous Pakistani critic and author, whilst praising Hayat Khan's work as 'enjoying a special status in PTV's seminal years' also stated that his popularity and that of other directors/producers like him, was 'fast declining among the young digital generation'. While Mustansar Hussain Tarar, another Pakistani writer, feels that "With the departure of Yawar Hayat a creative era of production and direction has come to an end. He was an excellent conversationalist and had a profound influence on anyone who met him." Moreover, he won many Awards including Asian Awards, Asian Excellence Performance Awards, Nigar Awards, and PTV Awards.

== Death ==
Yawar Hayat Khan died after a prolonged illness, in Lahore, Pakistan, on the evening of 3 November 2016.

== TV dramas ==
- Farar
- Goonj
- Kundi
- Lamp Post
- Sedhraan
- Qila Kahani
- Hairat Qadah
- Jhok Siyal (1973)
- Band Gali aur Khula Rasta (PTV Aur Dramay Series-1980s)
- Bandar Jaati aur Mamta (PTV Aur Dramay Series-1980s)
- Goonga aur Company Bahadur (PTV Aur Dramay Series-1980s)
- Qasai aur Mehngai (PTV Aur Dramay Series-1980s)
- Dehleez (1981)
- Nasheman
- Samundar (1983)
- Saahil-i-Gumshuda
- Phool (Ek Haqeeqat Ek Fasana Drama Series)
- Zanjeer (Ek Haqeeqat Ek Fasana Drama Series)
- Picnic (Drama 83)- 1983 Drama Series
- Gumshuda (Drama 88)- 1988 Drama Series
- Airport
- Jazeera
- Jheel (Jazeera Sequel)
- Lambay Hath
- Vaadi
- Malika e Alam
- Hisaab
- Aik Muhabbat Ki Kahani
- Zanjeer
- Sada Bahar
- Adam Zaad (Hairat Kadah Remake)
- Ye Kahani Nahi Hai
- Shanakht
- Parwaz

== Awards and nominations ==
Year	Award	Category	Result	Ref.
1998	9th PTV Awards	Best Producer	Won	
