= Krishna legends in Kathak =

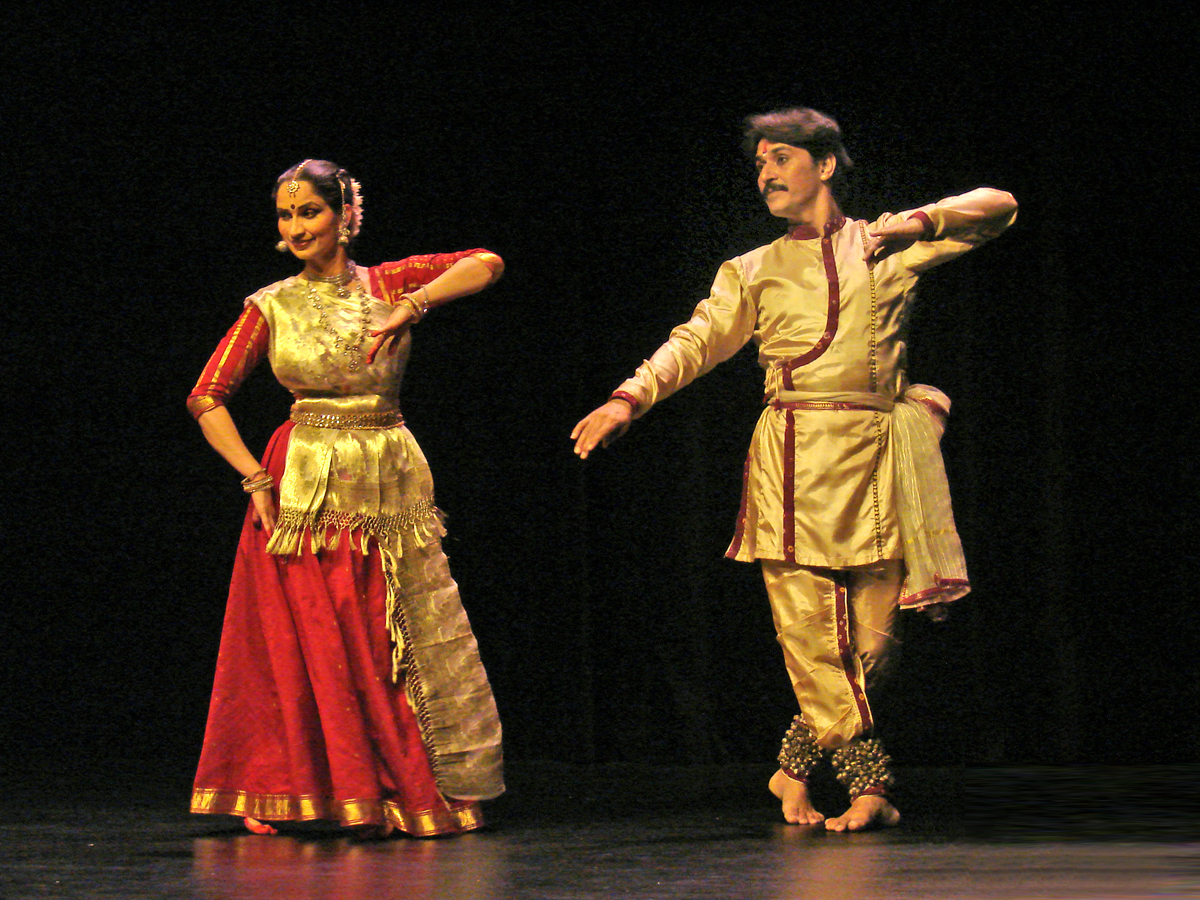
Kathak performance by Sharmila Sharma and Rajendra Kumar Gangani at the Guimet Museum (November 2007)

Kathak is a form of Indian classical dance. The dance style in its formative phase was inseparably linked with Krishna legend. The word Kathak comes from the word katha which means "story".

== History ==
Kathak has been closely associated with Krishna's legends. The earliest mention of Kathak as an art form is found in the Arjuna-Vanavasa chapter of the Aadi-Parva of Mahabharata. In its initial phase, Kathak is regarded to have been a mimetic representation of Puranic literature accompanied with dance. Kathakas were Granthikas reciting stories related to Vishnu. When Krishna was identified with Vishnu, Granthikas began narrating Krishna-based stories. During this time, a rich musical theater form had grown out of the rich Krishna theater tradition of Mathura region. It is believed that Katha-Vachan, the earliest form of Kathak was exclusively based on Krishna's legend.

== Forms of Krishna bhakti ==
The bhakti centering on Krishna is of two forms:

- Kanta bhava or worship of Krishna and Rukmini.
- Madhura bhava or worship of Krishna and Radha.

The concept of madhura bhakti where Lord is the "Supreme lover" gained popularity amongst the worshipers of Krishna. The most notable compositions are of the Ashtachhapkars. They were eight poets and the followers of Vallabhacharya and Vithalnath named as Surdas, Kumbhandas, Nandadas, Parmanandadas, Chaturbhujdas, Krishnadas, Govindswami and Chitswami. These poets produced a wealth of lyrical songs narrating the various episodes of Krishna's life with special emphasis on madhura bhava.

Kathak dancers liberally use these songs in their recitals. Krishna's childhood pranks, depicted by Surdas were the epitome of Vatsalyarasa. Even while depicting shringar rasa – madhura bhava, Krishna legend is shown with many splendored hues and colours. The amorous dalliance of the symbolic lovers Krishna and Radha is the meeting of Jeevatma with Parmatma. The outpourings of these saint-poets form an integral part of a Kathak dancer's repertoire.

== Themes ==
The Krishna theme in kathak may be one of these:

- Gat Nikas — these depict simple stories. In Gat Bhava, the dancer portrays two or more characters with a half-turn. This role playing is generalized under various gats like makhan chori, paniya bharan, chedchad, ghungat (veil), murli (flute), matki (pot), etc. where Krishna is symbolized by murli or crown and Radha by ghungat or matki.
- Kavita — These are poems set in rhythmic cycle narrating mythological episodes like kaliya, govardhan lila, etc. where the Dancer expresses the words of the kavita with appropriate hand gestures and symbols.
- Thumri — These are semi-classical music compositions exhaustively covering the entire gamut of emotions, situations, expressions and episodes of Krishna legends. A thumri may showcase love of Krishna and Radha depicting them together on a swing or in a boat or playing rasa or highlight their anxiety and distress during the period of separation. Thumri highlights the prowess of a Kathak dancer and are dealt with a lot of subtlety.

It is said that when Krishna danced his divine dance on the hood of the defeated serpent Kaliya, various mnemonic sounds emanated from Krishna's feet like Ta, Thai, Tat, etc. which formed the building blocks of Kathak. Krishna is also known as "Natwar", hence these sounds came to be known as Natwari.

== See also ==
- Kuchipudi
- Bharatanatyam
