= Hafeez Tahir =

TV producer

- حفیظ طاہر
- Born: September 2, 1947 (age 78); Mian Mir, Lahore, Pakistan
- Education: National College of Arts; University of the Punjab
- Occupations: Television producer Director; Writer; Poet
- Years active: 1980–2017
- Notable work: Ainak Wala Jin

Hafeez Tahir (Punjabi: حفیظ طاہر) (born 2 September 1947) is a Pakistani TV producer, director, poet and writer.

He directed the popular children's TV serial Ainak Wala Jin (1993).

== Early life and education ==
Hafeez Tahir was born in the Mian Mir village of Lahore, Pakistan on 2 September 1947. Belonging to a working-class family, he spent his early childhood in modest circumstances, living in a mud house and often watching trains pass near his home, a memory he recalls vividly from his youth. His father’s employment in Kuwait led the rest of his family to migrate to the Gulf, while Tahir remained behind, learning to live independently at a young age. He received most of his education in Lahore.

From an early age, Tahir developed a keen interest in literature and the performing arts. In junior school, he began participating in debates, stage performances, and creative writing. He went to Islamia College Railway Road, and later Government Islamia College, Civil Lines, Lahore followed by National College of Arts, where he initially studied architecture but left in his second year after excelling in English and being recommended by a teacher to go into literature, switching to University of the Punjab, Lahore. There, he got his master's degrees in Administrative Science and Urdu literature.

== Career ==
=== Literature ===
Tahir began his career as a poet and published his first poetry book Aathwaan Rang in 1980, followed by Zair-e-Zameen in 1993. His literary work later expanded to include writing for children, and published the children's novel Manzil Manzil; he has also worked on a collection of Punjabi poetry.

=== Politics ===
Politically, he was a founding member of Pakistan Peoples Party in 1967.

=== Television ===
He began his professional media career as an associate editor for a magazine at Nespak, where he was introduced to Pakistan Television (PTV) by actor Farooq Zameer. He started at PTV in 1980 as a production assistant and remained with the network as a programs producer until his retirement in 2017, retiring as executive producer.

=== Journalism ===
In addition to television production, Tahir has worked as a film journalist and a photojournalist; his photography has been recognized and awarded multiple times by the National Press Trust. Throughout his career he has collaborated with notable musicians and featured music-based television productions showcasing legendary artists.

== Books ==
- Aathwaan Rang (1980). Poetry.
- Zair-e-Zameen (1993). Poetry.
- Manzil Manzil (2017). Novel for children.

== Awards and recognition ==
- Pride of Performance Award by the President of Pakistan in 2023.
- Pakistan Television (PTV) 'Director of the Decade' Award won by Hafeez Tahir for Ainak Wala Jin (TV series).
