= Ainak Wala Jin =

Pakistani children's television series

- Title screen
- Genre: Children; Fantasy; Comedy
- Written by: Abdul Hameed
- Directed by: Hafeez Tahir
- Starring: Shehzad Qaiser; Munna Lahori; Sehrish Khan; Nisar Butt; Asad Bhandara; Nusrat Ara; Haseeb Pasha; Ijlal Tahir; Moattar Bokhari; Fariha Pervez; Humera Arshad; Jamil Fakhri; Albela; Arifa Siddiqui; Rashid Mehmood; Ghayyur Akhtar; Zeba Shehnaz
- Country of origin: Pakistan
- Original language: Urdu
- No. of seasons: 2
- No. of episodes: Season 1 (152), Season 2 (90)

Production
- Producer: Hafeez Tahir
- Production location: Lahore
- Production company: PTV

Original release
- Network: PTV One
- Release: April 25, 1993 – July 29, 2008

Ainak Wala Jin (Urdu: عینک والا جن, lit. 'The Spectacled Genie') is a Pakistani children's television series produced and broadcast by PTV Lahore from 1993 to 1996 and again from 2005 to 2008.

This drama was rebroadcast twice on television in Pakistan due to public demand. It was widely popular among children for its humour and fictional storyline. The first episode of this drama was aired on April 25, 1993. The first season, consisting of 152 episodes, ended on July 4, 1996. Ainak Wala Jin 2 went on air on March 27, 2005. The last of its 90 episodes went on air on July 29, 2008.

== Plot ==
The theme was conceived by Hafeez Tahir. The story follows a genie who lives among humans and encounters magicians, witches, other genies, extraterrestrial characters, and other figures. These encounters form the basis of the storyline, which incorporates elements of comedy, magic, moral themes, and educational content for children and adults.

== Cast ==
=== Season 1 ===
The main actors of this drama are:

- Shehzad Qaiser as Nastoor (Ainak Wala Jin).
- Sehrish Khan as Mother (Baji Farkhanda)
- Nabeel Ahmad Goheer as Daddy
- Munna Lahori as Zakoota Jin
- Ghayyur Akhtar as Samari Jadugar
- Ajlal Asim Bukhari as Imran
- Moattar Asim Bukhari (now Moattar Adeel) as Moattar
- Asim Bukhari as Bazurg
- Zahid Sharif as Jin
- Nusrat Ara as Bil Batori
- Farooq Butt as Space Chief
- Aneel Chaudhri as Ashkali
- Fariha Pervez as Aini
- Humera Arshad as Toofani Nagan
- Shabnam Majeed as Baaji
- Haseeb Pasha as Hamoon Jadoogar
- Asad Bhandara as Charlie Mamu
- Mukhtar Ahmad Shaad as Rehmu Baba
- Nisar Butt as Umro Ayyar
- Humza Ghayyur Akhtar as Dubi
- Hamza Bin Tahir as son of Nastoor
- Jameel Fakhri as Shah Taloos
- Albela as Taya Abba
- Honey Albela as Junior Taya Abba
- Umar Daraz Khalil as Aamlee Jadugar
- Rashid Mehmood as Sarkata Insaan
- Najma as Karnani Churail
- Babu Baral as (guest appearance) Jin
- Jamal Pasha as Chotta Jin
- Naeem Akhtar as Yamag (Pirate)
- Abida Beg as Anqa Jadogarni
- Farooq Zamir Ghory as Grandfather
- Humayon Rasheed as Shahenshah e Jinnat
- Tina Aftab as Auntie
- Amjad Zaidi as Mr. Z
- Aziz Khan as Mr. Y
- Waheed Majeed as Space Scientist
- Poonam Kashif as Moattar's friend
- Bilal Bokhari as Student Jin
- Reema Syed, daughter of Taya Abba
- Zeba Shehnaz as Jadogarni
- Tahira as Goshi
- Imran Akbar as Parizaad

=== Season 2 ===
The main actors of this drama are:

- Raza Qazi as Ibn e Nastoor (Ainak Wala Jin)
- Munna Lahori as Zakoota Jin
- Haseeb Pasha as Hamoon Jadoogar
- Nusrat Ara as Bill Batori
- Najma Begum as Karnani Churail
- Ghayur Akhtar as Samri Jadoogar
- Mukhtar Ahmad Shaad as Rehmu Baba
- Asad Bhandara as Charli Mamu
- Ramia as Mother
- Haider Sultan as Father
- Mannan as Mannan (Son)
- Yusra as Yusra (Daughter)
- Inshra Raja as Gulab Pari
- Asghar chaudhry as Kala Deo
- Samina Khalid as Rabata Jadoogarni
- Shahid Chaudhry as Tagout
- Abbas Bajwa as Raphrhi Jadoogar
- Atif Malik as Afrasyaab
- Humayun Rasheed as Shahenshah e Jinnat
- Sobia as Malaka e Koh Qaf
- Amir Wazir as Wazir e Jinnat
- Megha as Jadugarni

== Production ==
The serial was written by Abdul Hameed, who is popularly known as A Hameed. He has written about two hundred books, innumerable columns, memoirs, novels, fiction for children, and many serials for Pakistani television. His TV serials included Dachi, Alif Liala (many episodes), Ambar Naag Maria, and AINAK WALA JIN. The last one surpassed his other works in popularity.

== Popularity ==
The team was also invited by Imran Khan, the Pakistani cricketer turned politician, to raise funds for his Shaukat Khanum Memorial Cancer Hospital & Research Centre and, in this connection, the entire play team, along with the play director Hafeez Tahir, had the honour of performing before Princess Diana, Princess of Wales and Imran Khan in 1996. The play has also been presented on stage at the Alhamra Arts Council, Lahore, Pakistan.

== Sequel ==
The play was returned with a sequel, 'Ainak Wala Jin 2'.

== See also ==
- Pakistan Television Corporation
- List of television programmes broadcast by PTV
