= Arifa Siddiqui =

Pakistani actress

- عارفہ صدیقی
- Born: Arifa Siddiqui; 9 June 1969 (age 57); Lahore, Punjab, Pakistan
- Occupations: Actress; Singer
- Years active: 1980–present
- Spouses: Tabeer Ali (m. 2018) Ustad Nazar Hussain (m. 1995; died 2018)
- Children: 1
- Parent(s): Talat Siddiqui (mother); Mohammad Bashir Siddiqui (father)
- Relatives: Nahid Siddiqui (sister); Fariha Pervez (cousin); Rehana Siddiqui (aunt)

Arifa Siddiqui (Punjabi: عارفہ صدیقی) is a Pakistani actress and singer who is best known for appearing in several Pakistani TV shows in the 1980s and 1990s.

== Early life ==
Arifa was born on 9 June 1969 in Lahore, Pakistan. She is the daughter of actress Talat Siddiqui who worked for Pakistan radio and film industry. Her sister Nahid Siddiqui is a classical dancer and was previously married to television personality Zia Mohyeddin. Arifa is the cousin of Pakistani pop and TV singer Fariha Pervez. Actress Rehana Siddiqui was her aunt.

== Career ==
Arifa appeared in several Pakistani TV serials including Dehleez (1981), Sona Chandi (1983), Samundar (1983), Khawaja and Son (1985) and Ainak Wala Jin (1993).

== Personal life ==
Arifa’s first marriage was to Ustad Nazar Hussain, who was 30 years her senior. Hussain was a music composer and singer at PTV, Lahore, as well as her music teacher. Arifa quit the TV industry after her first marriage. The couple was married for 23 years until Hussain’s death in January 2018. She later married composer and singer Tabeer Ali.

== Filmography ==
=== Television series ===
Year	Drama	Role	Network	Notes	Ref.
1979	Alif Laila	Pari	PTV	Episode: Sunehri Parinda	
1981	Dehleez	Ani	PTV		
1982	Sona Chandi	Chhoti Bibi	PTV		
1982	Zard Gulab	Rani	PTV	Long-Play	
1982	Sarab	Sooban	PTV	Long-Play	
1983	Samundar	Sidra	PTV		
1984	Status		PTV		
1985	Tota Kahani		PTV		
1985	Khawaja and Son	Samina	PTV		
1988	Do Dhari Talwar	Saima	PTV	Anthology: Band Gali	
1988	Mirat-ul-Uroos	Asghari	PTV		
1989	Pyas	Seema	PTV		
1989	Neelay Hath	Sakeena	PTV		
1990	Fishaar	Rubab	PTV		
1992	Wadera Sayeen				
1993	Yes Sir No Sir				
1993	Ainak Wala Jin		PTV		
1994	Daldal	Saira	PTV		
1994	Manchaly ka Sauda	Salma	PTV		
1994	Baitay Baitian	Sharfi	PTV	Long-Play	
1994	Ehsaan	Sabiha	PTV	Long-Play	
1995	Aapa	Sajday	PTV	Anthology: Kahani Ghar	
1995	Khoobsurat	Saima	PTV	Long-Play	
1998	Larki Ek Sharmili Si	Nasreen	STN	Anthology: Comedy Theater	
1999	Ghareeb-e-Shehar	Mona	PTV		
1999	Farar		STN		
2000	Inkar		PTV		
2000	Karwat	Tabinda			
2004	Shahla Kot	Nazo			
2004	Over Smart		PTV	Sitcom	

=== Film ===
Year	Film	Language
1984	Aisa Bhi Hota Hay	Urdu
1985	Qismat	Punjabi
1985	Naraz	Urdu
1985	Wadera	Punjabi
1986	Aawara	Urdu
1986	Shah Zaman	Punjabi
1986	Dhanak	Urdu
1986	Qatil Ki Talash	Urdu
1987	Sangal	Punjabi
1987	Faqeeria	Punjabi
1987	Jugnu	Punjabi
1987	Moti Sher	Punjabi
1987	Son of Ann Daata	Urdu
1988	Pyar Tera Mera	Punjabi
1990	Babul	Punjabi
1992	Wadero Sain	Sindhi
1993	Da Dushmanai Or	Pashto
1996	Ghoonghat	Urdu

== Awards and recognition ==
Year	Award	Category	Result	Title	Ref.
1985	Nigar Award	Best Supporting Actress	Won	Qismat	
1986	Nigar Award	Best Supporting Actress	Won	Qatil Ki Talash	
