= Abdul Hameed (writer) =

Pakistani Urdu writer (1924-2011)

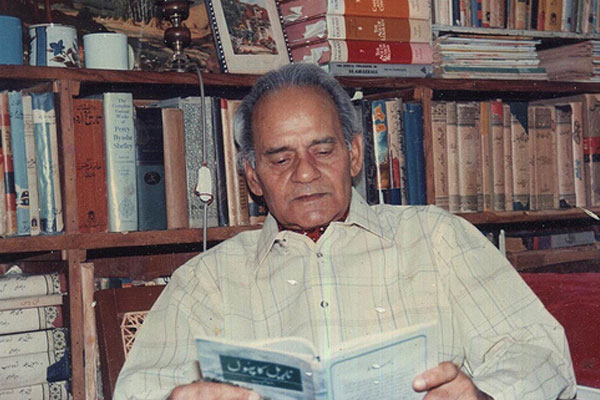
- Born: Abdul Hameed; 25 August 1928; Amritsar, British India
- Died: 29 April 2011 (aged 82); Lahore, Pakistan
- Occupations: Novelist, short story writer, playwright and broadcaster
- Writing career
- Years active: 1955–2011
- Notable works: Ambar, Naag & Maria, Tahly Thallay (TV serial), Ainak Wala Jin (1993) (A TV serial for children)
- Notable awards: Pride of Performance Award by the President of Pakistan in 1997
- Literary movement: Progressive Writers' Movement

Abdul Hameed (Urdu: اے۔ حمید-; 25 Aug 1928 – 29 April 2011), widely known by his pen name A. Hameed, was an Urdu fiction writer from Pakistan. He was also known for writing a popular children's TV play Ainak Wala Jin (1993) for Pakistan Television Corporation which was broadcast on PTV during the mid-1990s. He is also known for his Maut Ka Taaqub series, a novel for children spread over 300 issues and counting 35,000 pages.

== Biography ==
A. Hameed was an Urdu short story writer, novelist, columnist, and children's author. He established his literary identity with his debut novel Derbay (Urdu: ڈربے) in 1950 and his first collection of Urdu short stories Manzil, Manzil (منزل منزل) in 1952. He started writing Urdu fiction at a time when Saadat Hasan Manto, Krishan Chander, Rajinder Singh Bedi, Balwant Singh, Quratulain Haider, Mumtaz Mufti, Ashfaq Ahmed, and Ismat Chughtai were the Urdu fiction writers at the forefront of Indo-Pakistan's Progressive Writers Movement.

His other novels include Baarish mein judai /بارش میں جُدائی, Jungle rotay hain/ جنگل روتے ہیں, Zard gulaab / زرد گلاب, Barfbaari ki Raat / برف باری کی رات. He was also known for writing a popular children's TV play Ainak Wala Jin (1993) for Pakistan Television Corporation which was broadcast on Pakistan TV during the mid-1990s.

Besides writing Urdu fiction, A. Hameed worked as a Feature Writer for Pakistan Radio, Lahore Studios from 1947 onward till his retirement. In the 1980s, A. Hameed started writing a Sunday Urdu Column titled "Amritsar ki Yaadein" from the daily Nawai Waqt, Lahore that became very popular, was published in book form by Maqbool Sons Publishers Dyal Singh Mansion, Lahore and was later translated into English by Khalid Hassan. A. Hameed worked for Voice of America, Washington Studios for two years before returning to his home in Samanabad, Lahore. In the mid-1990s, Pakistan TV Lahore Studios producer Hafeez Tahir started broadcasting a Children's TV Drama Serial Ainak Wala Jinn with a screenplay written by A. Hameed that became a blockbuster hit all over Pakistan. This Children's TV Serial was later produced in book format as well. A. Hameed wrote an Urdu Children's Novel Series Ambar Naag Maria that ran into over a hundred novels and was very popular among young Pakistani children.

=== Early life and education ===
A. Hameed was born in 1928 in Amritsar, British India to Kashmiri parents Khalifa Abdul Aziz and Sardaar Begum. His father wanted to train him as a wrestler. In the last years of World War II, A. Hameed left Amritsar after completing matriculation exam to join his brother-in-law Captain Mumtaz Malik in Ceylon where Capt. Mumtaz Malik was a Radio Feature Writer in the British War Propaganda Cell in Columbo, Ceylon/Sri Lanka. After narrating for Radio plays at Radio Ceylon, A. Hameed was sent on a journalistic assignment to Rangoon, Burma/Myanmaar. A. Hameed wrote about his days spent in Sri Lanka and Burma during the last years of World War II in his short stories, especially the short story Chaandani aur Jazeeray / چاندنی اور جزیرے Amritsar, British India.

He completed his high school education in Amritsar and migrated to Lahore at the time of the Partition of British India into Pakistan and India in August, 1947. A. Hameed joined Radio Pakistan as an assistant script editor.He wrote numerous radio plays broadcast by Radio Pakistan, Lahore Studios. During his stay at Radio Pakistan that lasted till his retirement, A. Hameed started writing short stories, novels, newspaper columns, and children's novels.

=== Career ===
A. Hameed's first collection of short stories 'Manzil Manzil' received popular acclaim and he became recognized as a realist Urdu fiction writer and member of the Progressive Writers' Movement. Apart from writing short stories and novels, he wrote a Sunday column Amritsar kee Yaadein and later on Lahore kee Yaadein for the daily Nawai Waqt. He also wrote plays for radio and television.

A. Hameed has written more than 200 novels and 100 books comprising Urdu short stories, Urdu novels, Travelogues (Americano), Children's novel series, and Children's TV Drama Serial Ainak wala Jinn. In his youth, he was influenced by the Progressive Writers' Movement and especially by the writings of Saadat Hassan Manto Manto's quote about A Hameed getting romantic even on seeing a street lamp post and Krishan Chander. Urdu She'r Ki Dastan, Urdu Nasr ki Dastan (in which he has given information about the prose literature of many Urdu prose writers from Banda Nawaz Gesu Daraz to the recent prose writers of Deccan and Gujrat), Mirza Ghalib Lahore Mein and Dastango Ashfaq Ahmad are his most famous books.

His drama Ainak Wala Jin was popular with children which was aired on PTV during the mid-1990s. It was staged in Drama Theatres in Lahore and later turned into a book series for children. In 1996 he wrote a PTV documentary telefilm Operation Dwarka 1965. Moreover, his fantasy series of 100 novels for children known as the Ambar Naag Maria (series of books) increased his popularity. He was awarded Pride of Performance by the Government of Pakistan. He is the author of a Series named Mout Ke Taaqob Mia Pursuing the Death this series has three hundred episodes His drama Ainak Wala Jin was popular with children which was aired on PTV during the mid-1990s. In 1996 he wrote a PTV documentary telefilm Operation Dwarka 1965. Moreover, his fantasy series of 100 novels for children known as the Ambar Naag Maria (series of books) increased his popularity.

=== His Books ===
- Manzil Manzil (منزل منزل)(Destination after Destination)(ISBN 9693505018, Publisher: SMP, Language: Urdu, Category: Short Stories Year: 1996)
- Bharat ke Firaun(9 parts)بھارت کے فرعون
- Khufia Mission خفیہ مشن
- Commando Operation کمانڈو آپریشن
- Action Dwarka ایکشن دوارکا
- RAW ki Saazish را کی سازش
- Gwalior ke Torture Cell گوالیار کے ٹارچر سیل
- Fauji Camp se Faraar فوجی کیمپ سے فرار
- Commando Attack کمانڈو اٹیک
- Bharati Dehshatgard بھارتی دہشت گرد
- Sarfarosh Mujahid سرفروش مجاہد
- Urdu Nasr ki Daastaan (اردو نثر کی داستان)(Story of Urdu Prose)(14 Parts)(Publisher: Matbuaat Sheikh Ghulam Ali Lahore, Language: Urdu, Category: Literary Criticism & Research, Year: 1999)
- Amber, Naag and Maria عنبر ناگ ماریا (Amber, Naag and Maria) (Children’s Adventure Series, 287 Parts)

First 100 parts titled Maut ka Taaqqub (موت کا تعاقب) (In Pursuit of Death)

Next 100 parts titled Amber, Naag, Maria ki Wapsi (عنبر، ناگ، ماریا کی واپسی) (The Return of Amber, Naag and Maria)

Final parts titled Amber, Naag, Maria Katee Khala Mein (عنبر، ناگ، ماریا کٹی خلا میں) (Amber, Naag and Maria in Space)(Publisher: Shiekh Ghulam Ali & Sons Language: Urdu; Category: Children’s Adventure / Science Fiction; Year: 1960s–1990s)

== Death ==
Abdul Hameed died of cardiac disease, diabetes and kidney problems on 29 April 2011 at the age of 85. His funeral was attended by many fellow writers including Ata ul Haq Qasmi and the veteran journalist Mujibur Rehman Shami.

== Awards and recognition ==
- Pride of Performance Award by the President of Pakistan in 1997.
