= Sehrish Khan =

Pakistani actress

- سحرش خان
- Born: 10 July 1959 (age 67); Lahore, Punjab, Pakistan
- Occupation: TV actress
- Years active: 1979–present
- Known for: Samundar (1983); Ainak Wala Jin (1993)
- Children: 3

Sehrish Khan (born 10 July 1959) is a Pakistani TV actress who worked in TV plays mostly during the 1980s and 1990s. She is known for her roles in TV dramas Samundar (1983), Andhera Ujala (1984), and Ainak Wala Jin (1993).

== Career ==
Sehrish started her acting career in 1979 at PTV Lahore. Her first notable drama was Amjad Islam Amjad's Samundar (1983). During 1984-1985, she made several guest appearances in the TV serial Andhera Ujala along with the regular cast. Her role as Farkhanda in the children's fictional play Ainak Wala Jin was an important milestone in her career. The play was aired on PTV in 1993-1996. Madaar (1990) and Rait (1992) were among her other notable TV dramas. In 1995, she starred in the drama Master Barket Masih, based on the issues of educational system. In the late 1990s, she took a break from acting and returned to television in 2009.

In 2012, she appeared in the telefilm Des Mein Nikla Chand which was aired on PTV. In 2015, she appeared in Geo TV's drama Tera Mera Rishta as Aliya. Her other telefilm was Bhaylan (2016), which was written by Attaullah Ali and produced by Shaukat Chingizi.

== Personal life ==
In the late 1990s, she married a businessman and settled in Los Angeles.

== Filmography ==
=== Television series ===
Year	Title	Role	Network
1983	Samundar	Sumaira	PTV
1984	Andhera Ujala	Saima	PTV
1987	Waadi	Kulsoom	PTV
1989	Hisaar	Salma	PTV
1990	Madaar	Aasma	PTV
1992	Rait	Mehlab	PTV
1992	Sham Savair		PTV
1993	Zameen	Sozaena	PTV
1993	Ainak Wala Jin	Farkhanda	PTV
1994	Aashob		PTV
1995	Master Barkat Masih	Sahla	PTV
1996	Hip Hip Hurray	Herself	PTV
1998	Gereye Ban	Noreen	PTV
1999	Comedy Theater		PTV
2015	Tum Mere Kya Ho	Rehman Begum	PTV
2015	Tera Mera Rishta	Aliya	Geo Entertainment
2015	Aangan Mein Deewar		PTV

=== Telefilm ===
Year	Title	Role
2012	Des Mein Nikla Chand	Shaista
2016	Bhalyan	Hamna

== Awards and nominations ==
Year	Award	Category	Result	Title	Ref.
1996	STN Awards	Best Talent	Won	Hip Hip Hurray	
