= Feroz Gul =

Sindhi musician and composer

Ustad Feroz Gul Sindhi: استاد فيروز گل
- Born: 16 June 1943
- Died: 14 October 1996 (aged 53)
- Occupations: Singer, Music Director
- Years active: 1925 – 1975 Son = Ustaad Salamat Feroz Salamat
- Awards: Tamgha-i-Imtiaz (Medal of Distinction) (2012) by the Government of Pakistan

Ustad Feroz Gul (Sindhi: فيروز گل) was a Sindhi-language musician and composer from Pakistan.

== Awards and recognition ==
- Tamgha-e-Imtiaz (Medal of Distinction) in 2012 by the Government of Pakistan.
