= Kathak =

Classical dance form from North India

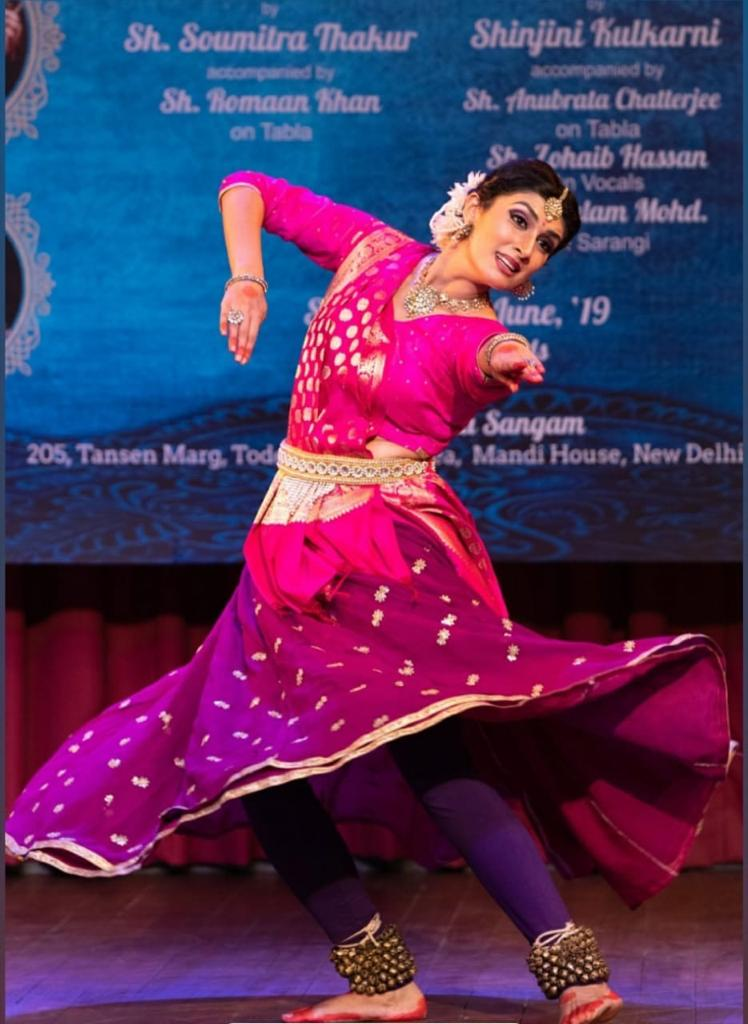
- Shinjini Kulkarni presenting a Kathak performance
- Genre: Indian classical dance
- Instrument(s): Ghungroo, Tabla, Pakhawaj, Manjira
- Origin: Uttar Pradesh

Kathak is one of the eight major forms of Indian classical dance. Its origin is attributed to the traveling bards in ancient northern India known as Kathakaar ("storyteller"), who communicated stories from the Hindu epics through dance, songs, and music. Its name derives from the Sanskrit word kathaa which means "story", and kathakaar which means "the one who tells a story" or "to do with stories". As time went on the dance-form acquired aspects of technical movement expertise in addition to the story-telling features, so nowadays performers usually give equal emphasis to both.

Kathak evolved during the Bhakti movement, particularly by incorporating the childhood stories of the Hindu deity Krishna, as well as independently in the courts of North India. Especially during the Mughal rule, the emperors were patrons of Kathak dance and actively promoted it in their royal courts. The Nawab of Awadh, Emperor Wajid Ali Shah himself was a practitioner of Kathak. Kathak performances include Urdu ghazal and commonly used instruments brought during the Mughal period. As a result, it is the only Indian classical dance form to feature Persian elements.

Stylistically, the Kathak dance form emphasizes rhythmic foot movements, with the ankles adorned with small bells (Ghungroo) and the movement harmonized to the music and especially its rhythm. The legs and torso are generally straight, and if a story is being told, it is through a developed vocabulary based on the gestures of arms and upper body movement, facial expressions, neck movements, eyes and eyebrow movement, stage movements, bends, and turns. The main focus of the dance becomes the eyes and the foot movements. The eyes work as a medium of communication of the story the dancer is trying to communicate. With the eyebrows the dancer gives various facial expressions.

Kathak is mainly found in four styles or schools, called "gharana", named after the cities where the Kathak dance tradition evolved – Jaipur, Banares, and Lucknow and Raigarh. These forms used to be quite distinct in their style and presentation but in recent years have converged to an extent, although they still retain their specialities. The Jaipur gharana focuses on technical expertise, with long pure dance compositions and fast spins and footwork; the Banaras gharana focuses on footwork and story-telling about Krishna, and Lucknow gharana focus more on grace and elegance. There is a fourth gharana which evolved in the court of the King of Raigarh, where the king invited representatives of all three gharanas to his court to serve as court dancers and teachers. The result produced some unique compositions, known as the Raigarh gharana.

Kathak is a performative art form that has survived and thrived as an oral tradition, innovated and taught from one generation to another verbally and through practice. It transitioned, adapted, and integrated the tastes of the Mughal courts in the 16th and 17th centuries, particularly by Akbar, but stagnated and went into decline during the British colonial era, then was reborn as India gained independence and sought to rediscover its ancient roots and a sense of national identity through the arts.

== Etymology and nomenclature ==
The term Kathak is rooted in the Vedic term Katha (Sanskrit: कथा) which means "story, conversation, traditional tale". It differs from the numerous folk dance forms found in the north and other parts of the Indian subcontinent.

The Kathak dancers in ancient India were traveling bards and were known as Kathakas or Kathakar.

Kathak has inspired simplified regional variants, such as the Bhavai – a form of rural theatre focusing on the tales of Hindu people (Shakti) – and one which emerged in the medieval era, and is presently found in Gujarat, Rajasthan, and Madhya Pradesh. Another variant that emerged from ancient Kathak is Thumri.

Thumri was developed by the tawaif community who were called "nautch" dancers by the British. Their history as Kathak dancers have been erased in modern India. Pallabi Chakravorty. (2008)."Bells Of Change: Kathak Dance, Women And Modernity In India", also see "The Tawaif And The Item Girl: A Struggle For Identity"

== History ==
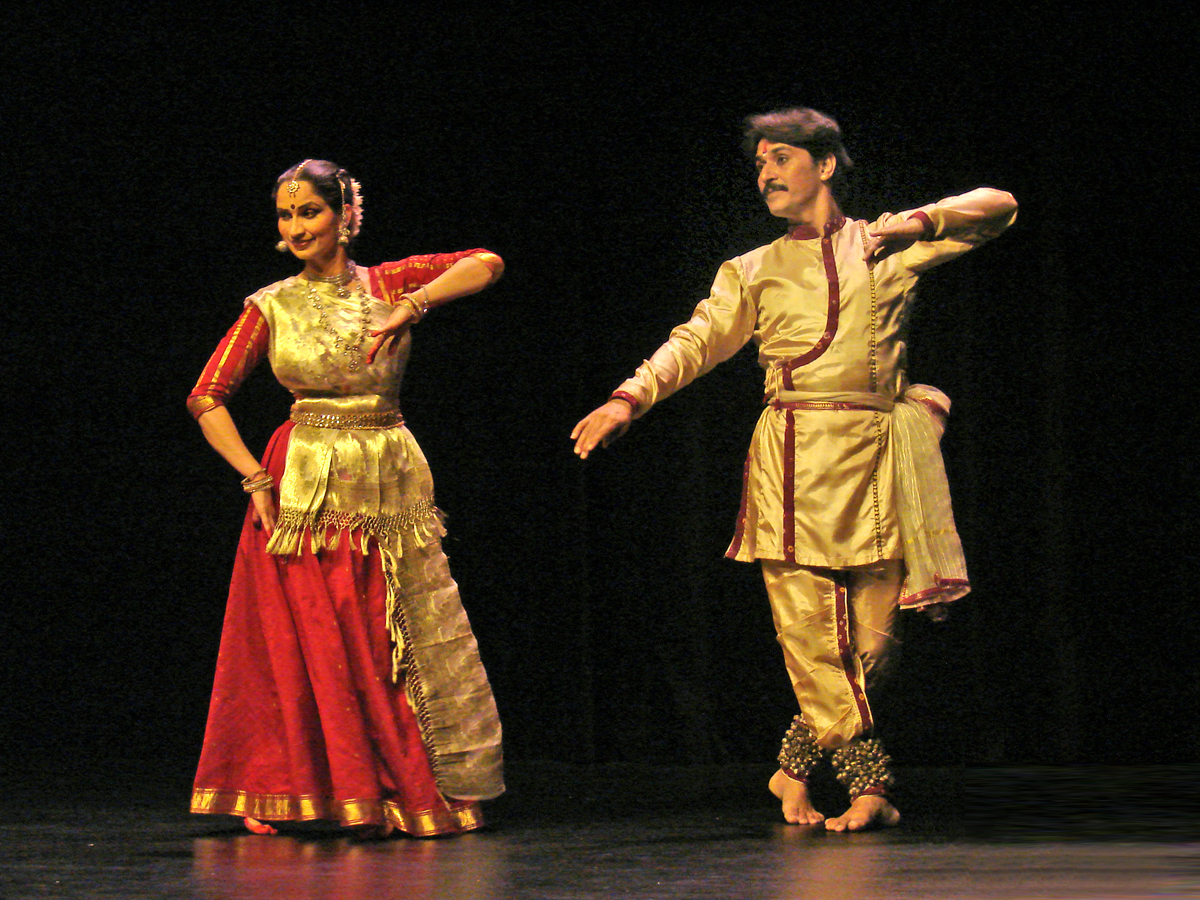
Performance by Sharmila Sharma and Rajendra Kumar Gangani at the Guimet Museum (November 2007)

Performance arts and culture

Let Nātya (drama and dance) be the fifth vedic scripture.
Combined with an epic story,
tending to virtue, wealth, joy and spiritual freedom,
it must contain the significance of every scripture
and forward every art.

— Nātyaśāstra 1.14–15

According to Mary Snodgrass, the Kathak tradition of India is traceable to 400 BCE. The earliest surviving text with Kathak roots is the Natya Shastra, attributed to sage Bharata. Its first complete compilation is dated to between 200 BCE and 200 CE, but estimates vary between 500 BCE and 500 CE.

The most studied version of the Natya Shastra text consists of about 6000 verses structured into 36 chapters. Natalia Lidova states that the text describes the theory of Tāṇḍava dance (Shiva), the theory of rasa, of bhāva, expression, gestures, acting techniques, basic steps, and standing postures – all of which are part of Indian classical dances, including Kathak. Dance and performance arts, states this ancient Hindu text, are a form of expression of spiritual ideas, virtues, and the essence of scriptures.

The 2nd century BCE panels found in Bharhut show the dancers in a vertical stance with their arms' positions already suggesting today's Kathak movements. Most of the dancers have one arm near the ear in a ''pataka hasta'' (mudra). In subsequent years, the hasta was lowered to the bust level.

The term Kathakas in the sense of "storytellers" appears in ancient Hindu texts, such as the Mahabharata:

वेदवेदाङ्गविद्वांसस्तथैवाध्यात्मचिन्तकाः।
चौक्षाश्च भगवद्भक्ताः सूताः पौराणिकाश्च ये॥२॥
कथकाश्चापरे राजञ्श्रमणाश्च वनौकसः।
दिव्याख्यानानि ये चापि पठन्ति मधुरं द्विजाः॥३॥

Followed by the scholars of the Vedas and Vedangas, and by those who ponder on their soul,
by persons skilled in music, by the devotees of Bhagavata, (...)
by Kathakas (reciters of the sacred lore), by dwellers of forests, (...)
by those who sweetly recite celestial histories.

— Adi Parva CCVI.2-3, Mahabharat, Book 1 (Note: The verse number is of the critical edition used by JAB van Buitenen. There are many manuscripts of the Mahabharata, and in some versions such as the one translated by Manmatha Nath Dutt in 1894, this verse is found in his chapter 226.)

Bards, actors, dancers, songsters, and musical reciters of legends and stories are mentioned hundreds of times in the Hindu Epics.

=== Bhakti movement era ===
Textual studies suggest that Kathak as a classical dance form likely started in Banares (Varanasi) and from there migrated northwest to Lucknow, Jaipur, and other parts of north and northwest India. The Lucknow tradition of Kathak dance attributes the style to a Bhakti movement devotee named Ishwari from the Handia village in Prayagraj, Uttar Pradesh, who credited Hindu god Krishna appearing in his dream and asking him to develop "dance as a form of worship". Ishwari taught his descendants, who in turn preserved the learning and developments through an oral tradition over six generations, ultimately yielding the Lucknow version of the Kathak dance – a family tree that is acknowledged in both Hindu and Muslim music-related Indian literature.

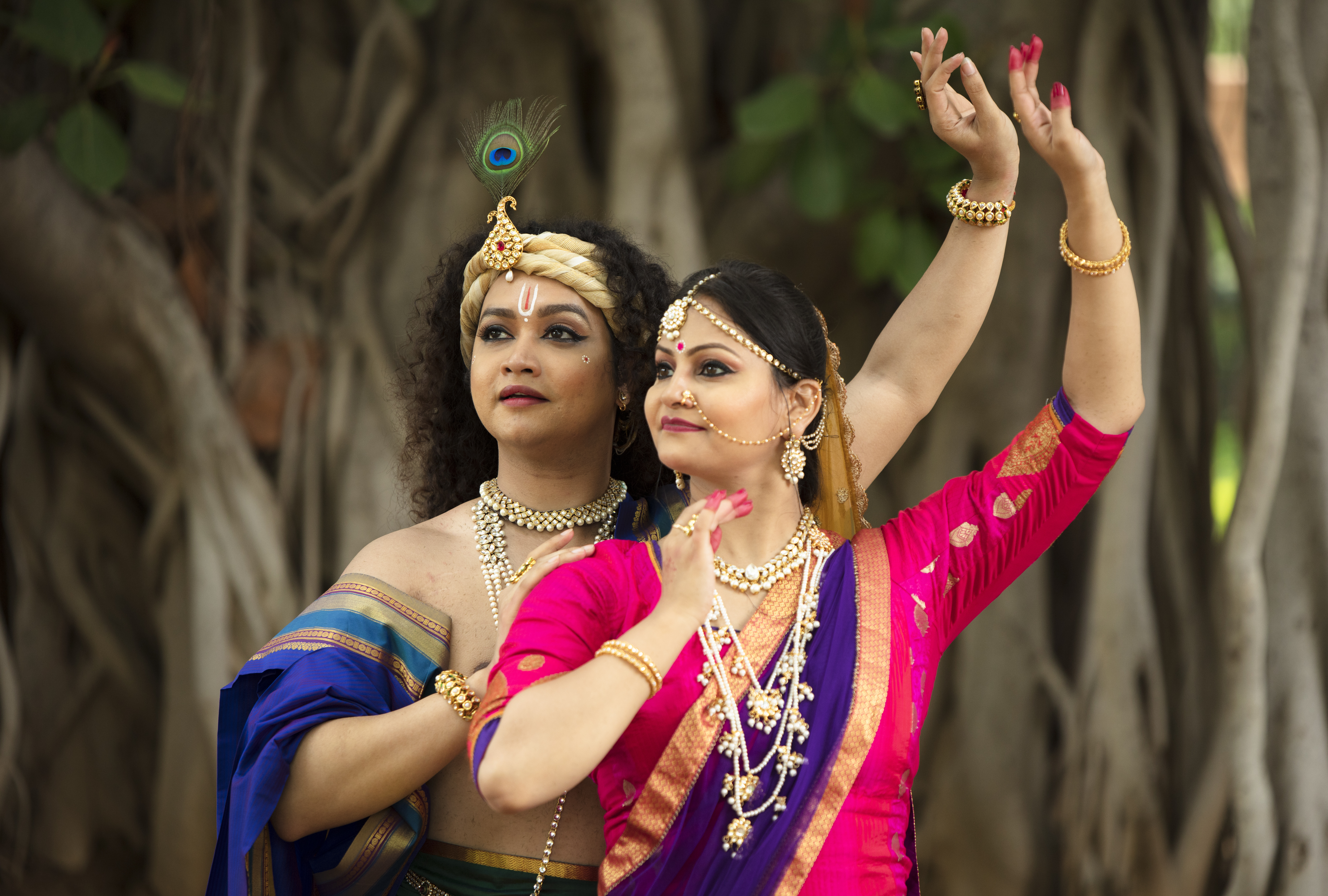
A picture from The Musical - Gita Govinda, Namrata Rai as Radha and Vishal Krishna as Krishna

The evolution in Kathak dance theme during the Bhakti movement centered primarily around divine Krishna, his lover Radha, and milkmaids (gopis) – around legends and texts such as the Bhagavata Purana found in the Vaishnavism tradition of Hinduism. The love between Radha and Krishna became symbolism for the love between Atman (soul within) and the supreme source (Cosmic soul everywhere), a theme that dance ballet and mimetic plays of Kathak artists expressed. Although central Asian influence of Kathak rapid whirls has been proposed, Sangitaratnakara, a 13th-century Sanskrit text on Indian classical music and dance in Chapter 4 mentions a dance movement with rapid whirling around like a wheel keeping the arms in the Dola pose and bending the body inwards called 'Cakramandala'. It is employed in worshipping gods and in vigorous movement.

The emergence of Raslila, mainly in the Braj region (Mathura in Western U.P.) was an important development. It combined in itself music, dance, and the narrative. Dance in Raslila, however, was mainly an extension of the basic mime and gestures of the Kathakars or story-tellers which blended easily with the existing traditional dance.

=== Mughal era ===
With the coming of the Mughals, this dance form received a new impetus. A transition from the temple courtyard to the palace durbar took place which necessitated changes in presentation. In both Hindu and Muslim courts, Kathak became highly stylized and came to be regarded as a sophisticated Islamic form of entertainment. Under the Muslims, there was a greater stress on nritya and bhavag - the dance's graceful, expressive, and sensuous dimensions.

The Mughal era courts and nobles accepted Kathak as a form of aristocratic entertainment, which low income families were willing to provide. According to Drid Williams:

It should be remembered that the first Kathak dancers were, after all, Hindus who danced for Moghul overlords. Too much outward expression of religious belief was without doubt undesirable. It is therefore reasonable to assume that the wide use of 'abstract' dancing, intricate bell work (tatkar), dazzling turns and the fleeting, transient, glimpses of Radha and Krishna in Kathak arose both to remind the dancers about their reasons for dancing and (gently, unobtrusively) to deceive their courtly Moghul audiences. Perhaps tatkar and tukras formed the bulk of these first dancers' performances. Gradually more and more images, then stories of Krishna and Radha crept in.

— Drid Williams, Anthropology and the Dance

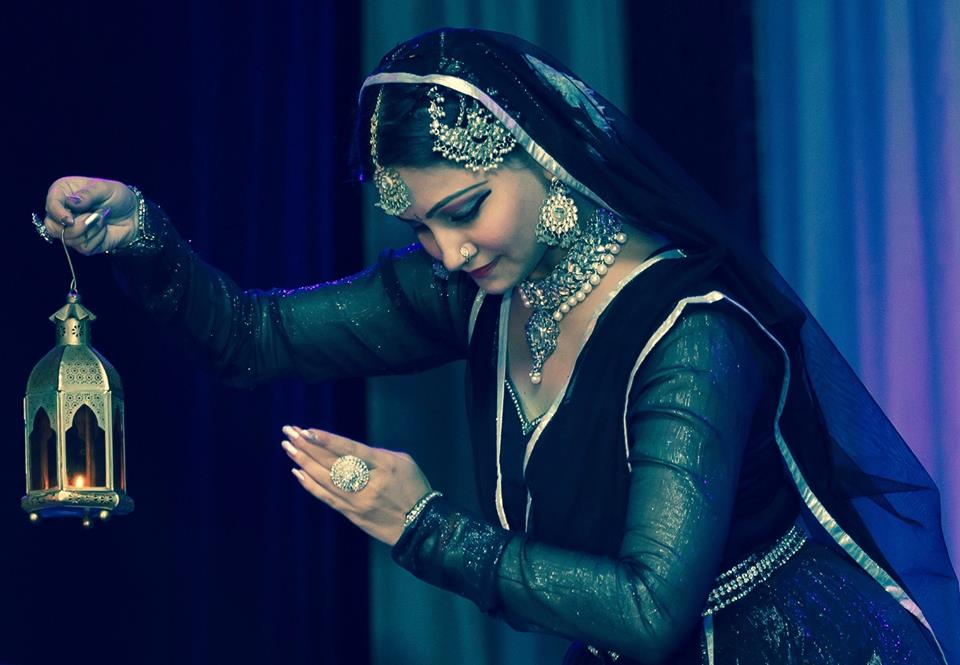
Namrata Rai (Kathak Dancer) while performing Sufi poetries in a concert

Over time, the Kathak repertoire added Persian and Central Asian themes, such as the whirling of Sufi dance. The dress replaced sari with items that bared midriff and included a transparent veil of the type common with medieval Harem dancers. When the colonial European officials began arriving in India, the Kathak court entertainment they witnessed was a synthesis of the ancient Indian tradition and Central Asian-Persian dance form.

=== British Raj era ===
With the expansion of British colonial rule in 19th-century India, Kathak along with all other classical dance forms were discouraged and it went into decline. This was in part the result of the Victorian morality of sexual repressiveness along with Anglican missionaries who criticized Hinduism. Reverend James Long, for example, proposed that Kathak dancers should forget ancient Indian tales and Hindu legends, and substitute them with European legends and Christian tales. Missionaries recorded their frustration in Church Missionary Review when they saw Hindu audiences applaud and shout "Ram, Ram" during Kathak performances.

The seductive gestures and facial expressions during Kathak performances in Temples and family occasions were caricatured in The Wrongs of Indian Womanhood, published at the start of the 20th century, as evidence of "harlots, debased erotic culture, slavery to idols and priests" tradition, and Christian missionaries demanded that this must be stopped, launching the "anti-dance movement" or "anti-nautch movement" in 1892. Officials and newspapers dehumanized the Kathak dancers and the sources of patronage were pressured to stop supporting the Kathak performing "nautch girls" (also termed as devadasis and tawa'ifs in mid 20th century literature). Many accused the dance form as a front for prostitution, while revivalists questioned the constructed histories by the colonial writers.

Not only did missionaries and colonial officials ridicule the Kathak dancers, Indian men who had been educated in British institutions and had adapted to Victorian prudery also joined the criticism, states Margaret Walker, possibly because they had lost their cultural connection, no longer understood the underlying spiritual themes behind the dance, and assumed this was one of the "social ills, immoral and backward elements" in their heritage that they must stamp out. However, the Hindu families continued their private tutoring and kept the Kathak art alive as an oral tradition. Kathak teachers also shifted to training boys to preserve the tradition, as most of the 20th-century ridicule had been directed at Kathak "nautch girls".

Kathak was brought to the attention of audiences outside India in the early 20th century through Kalkaprasad Maharaj.

=== Post-independence era ===
The movement to end the colonial era and for an independent India, states Walker, also witnessed a revival of Kathak and more broadly, a cultural ferment and effort to reclaim culture and rediscover history.

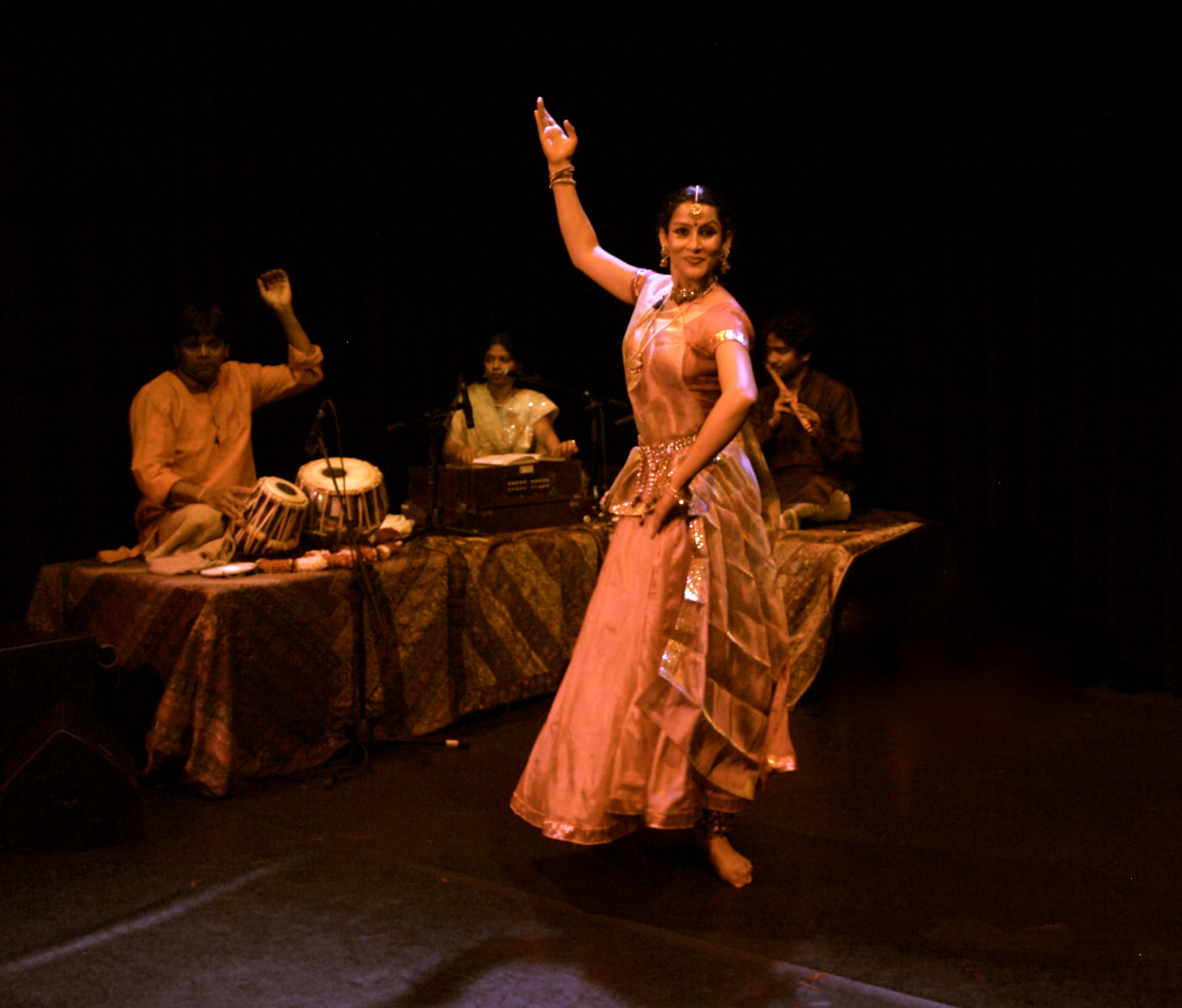
State of 'sam' performed by Manisha Gulyani

The Kathak revival movements co-developed in Hindu gharanas, particularly by the Kathak-Misra community. Of these the Jaipur and Lucknow sub-traditions of Kathak have attracted more scholarship.

The oldest Kathak department pat a degree college (university) was formed in 1956 at Indira Kala Sangeet University, a public university located in Khairagarh where Puru Dadheech instated the first Kathak syllabus for degree programs. It was inspired by the diploma syllabus of Mohanrao Kallianpurkar at Bhatkhande College.

According to a BBC Arts article, Kathak is unique in being practiced by the Muslim community of the India, and thus has a "historical link to Islam." Farah Yasmeen Shaikh, a Muslim and a disciple of Pandit Chitresh Das in the Lucknow school, considers Kathak as a "confluence of Hindu and Muslim cultures", and has presented her performance in Pakistan. In contrast, states BBC, Nahid Siddiqui (a legendary Kathak dancer from Pakistan, settled and nurtured in the UK), "has a hard time practising and presenting her [Kathak] art in her birth-country of Pakistan".

While most scholars consider Kathak as an ancient art, some such as Margaret Walker suggest the modern Kathak is a 20th-century phenomenon, more a form of cultural revival, if one relies on the music-related Indian documents.

== Repertoire ==
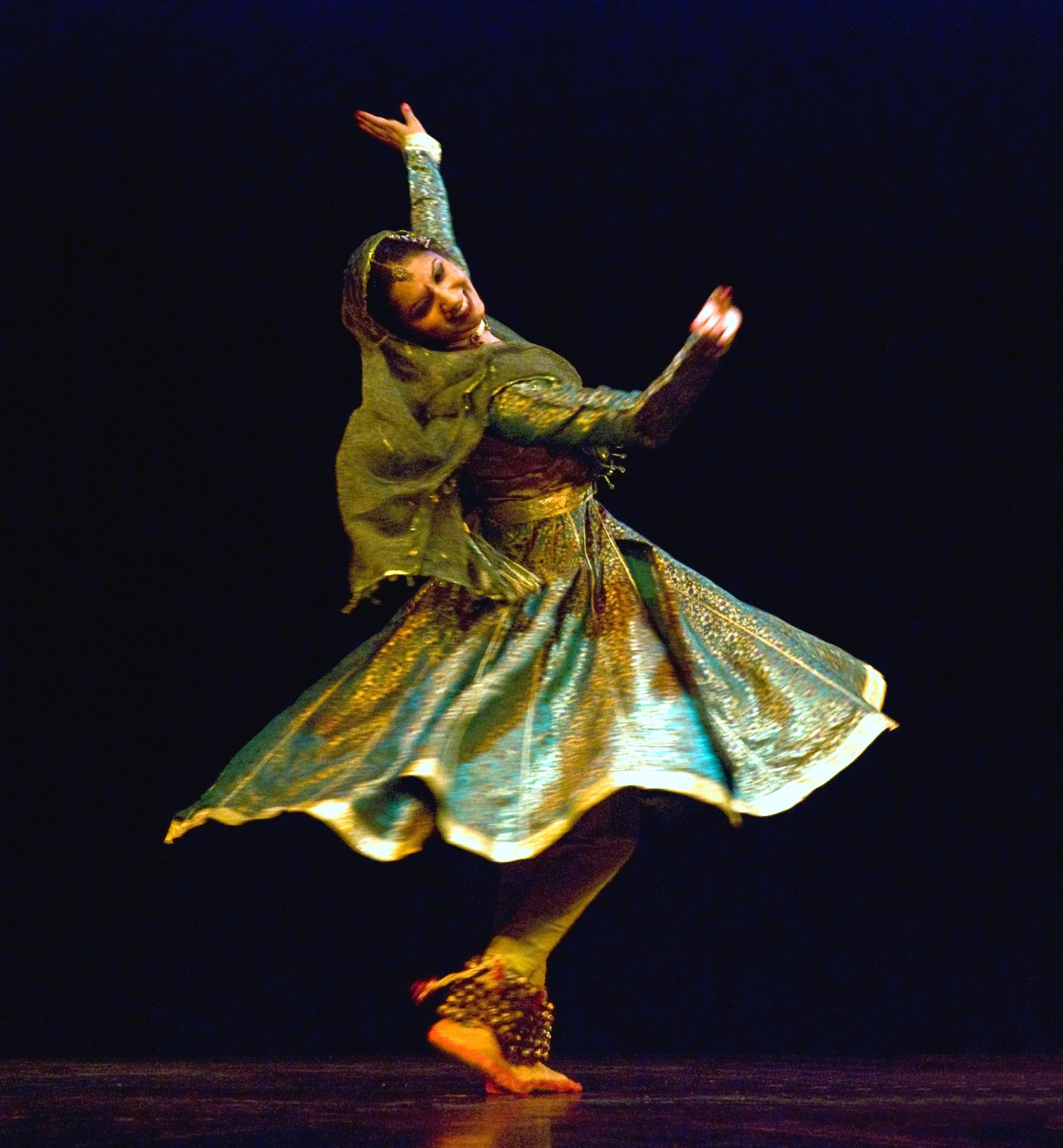
Chakkarwala tukra is a swirling part, here performed by Richa Jain

A modern Kathak, in all three major sub-traditions called Lucknow, Banares, and Jaipur styles (gharana), states Bruno Nettl, consist of three main sections - the invocation, one pure (abstract) dance recital, and one expressive dance.

The invocation (vandana) consists of the dancer coming to stage and offering respect to his or her guru and the musicians on the stage. If the team is from the Hindu tradition, the dancer(s) combine facial expressions and hand gestures (mudra) to invoke Hindu gods and goddesses; while a Muslim performance replaces the devotional expressions with a salami (salutation).

The pure dance is called a nritta, while the expressive dance is called a nritya. A Kathak performance can be solo, duo, or team. In a technical performance, the speed and energy the dancers exchange with the audience increases in multiples, that is, the tempo doubles or quadruples. During the performance, one or more of the Kathak artists may come to the microphone, interact with the audience, explain something, tell an anecdote in a particular language, or rhythmically recite a song.

The dresses of the dancer and the facial cosmetics between a Hindu or Muslim Kathak dance troupe varies. The stage typically is bare with no distracting background, states Williams, with musicians seated on rugs downstage right (audience's left), and if it is a Hindu performance there is an image of dancing Shiva (Nataraja) or a Ganesha on the stage's left with flowers and perfumed incense burning. (Note: Alternatively, there may be an image of a spiritual leader or someone that the Kathak artists revere.)

=== Pure dance (Nritta) ===
The nritta performance starts off with a thàth sequence, which is a slower graceful movement of wrists, neck, and eyebrows. Thereafter, the dancer gradually increases speed and energy, while completing a sequence of bol (mnemonic syllables in Indian tradition). Each bol has short sections, similar to technical exercises in Western dance traditions, wherein the dancer engages the audience with tora, tukra, parhant, paran, and others stressing footwork, gestures, and turns. Each section when completed has a punctuation mark, usually a sharp turn of the head. Each ankle is adorned with small bells (ghungroo), which may have just one bell or hundreds. The dancer's rapid movements and footwork in a nritta is perfectly timed to the musical beats (tala) and tempos, and the footwork sequences are called tatkars.

Most of the Nritta performance is abstract, fast, and rhythmic. In a Kathak nritta, as with all classical Indian dance forms, the viewer is presented with pure movement, wherein the emphasis is the beauty in motion, form, speed, range, and pattern. It aims to engage the senses (prakriti) of the audience.

=== Expressive dance (Nritya) ===
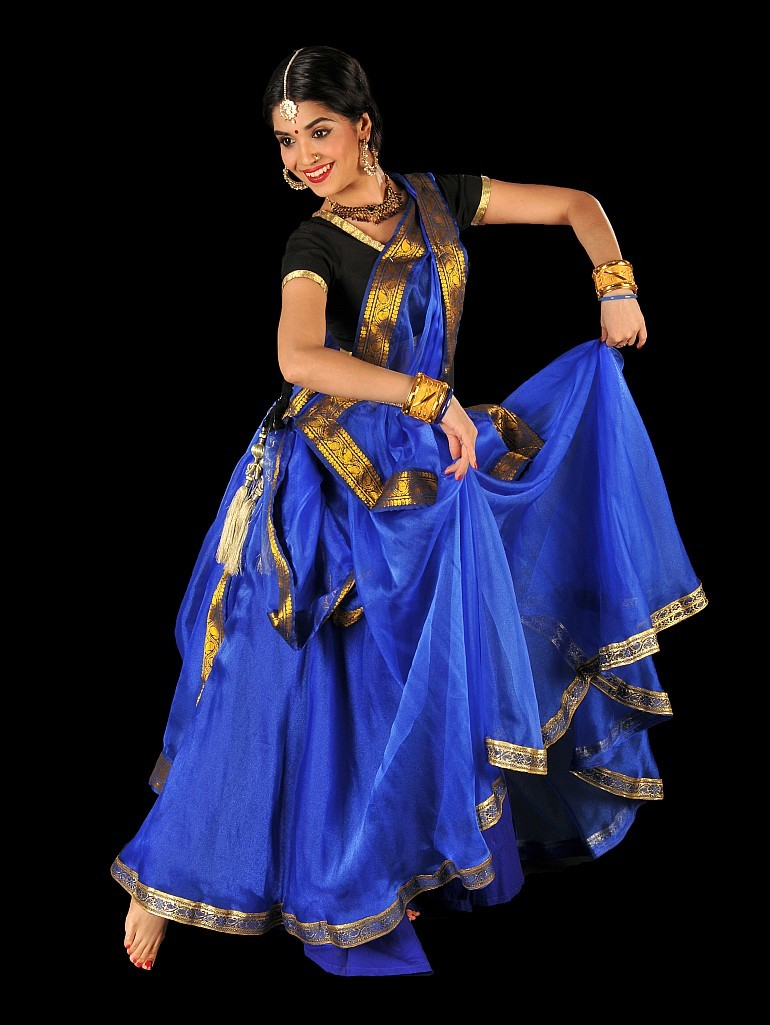
The expressive (nritya) stage of the Kathak dance, in Hindu dress

Nritya is a slower and expressive aspect of Kathak that attempts to communicate feelings and storyline particularly with spiritual themes in Hindu dance traditions. In a nritya, the dance expands to include words, musical notes, and gestures to articulate a legend or message. It is more than sensory enjoyment; it aims to engage the emotions and mind of the viewer.

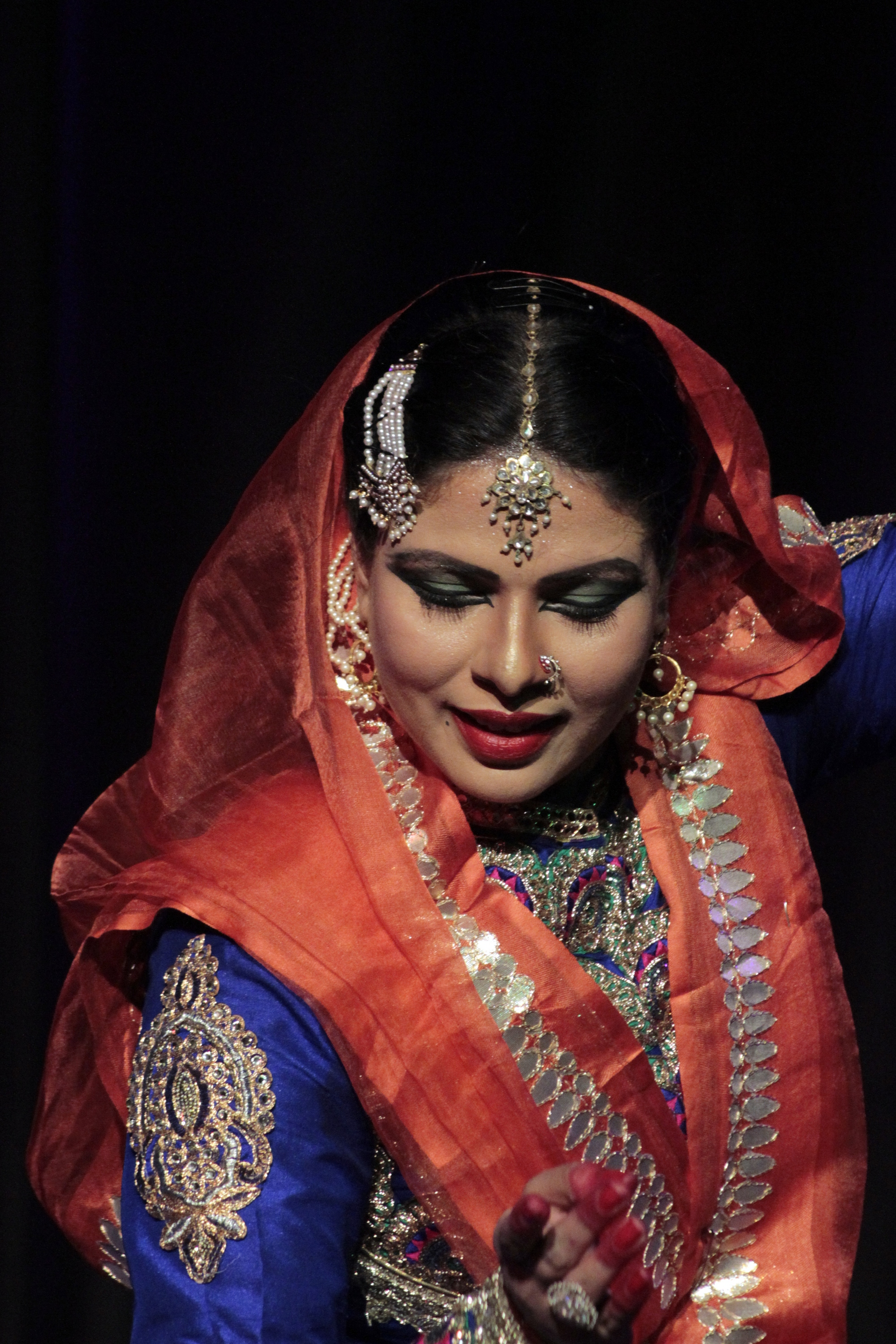
Facial expressions

The expressiveness of Kathak is also found in other classical dances of India. Its roots are found in the Natyashastra text which defines drama in verse 6.10 as that which aesthetically arouses joy in the spectator, through the medium of actor's art of communication, that helps connect and transport the individual into a super sensual inner state of being. The Natya connects through abhinaya (literally, "carrying to the spectators"), that is applying body-speech-mind and scene, wherein asserts Natyashastra, the actors communicate to the audience, through song and music. Drama in this ancient Sanskrit text, thus, is an art to engage every aspect of life, in order to glorify and gift a state of joyful consciousness. According to Massey, another important ancient text that has influenced Kathak is the Abhinaya Darpanam of Nandikeshvara (~2nd century CE).

In Kathak, abhinaya is in the form of expressive gestures and pantomime set to music that usually outlines a legend or the plot of a well known story. The gestures and facial expressions convey the ras (sentiment, emotional taste) and bhava (mood) of the underlying story. In the Hindu texts on dance, the guru and the artists successfully express the spiritual ideas by paying attention to four aspects of a performance: Angik (gestures and body language), Vachik (song, recitation, music, and rhythm), Aharya (dress, make-up, jewelry), and Satvik (artist's mental disposition and emotional connection with the story and audience, wherein the artist's inner and outer state resonates). A Kathak nritya performance, however, grants flexibility to the artists and invites improvisation, and it may not be accompanied with a song or recital about the legend. The stories in Kathak performance generally tend to be about the Hindu god Krishna (or in some cases Shiva or Devi), and the stories come from sources such as the Bhagavata Purana or the Indian Epics. This form of expressiveness is also found in thumri and Persian ghazals.

=== Dresses ===
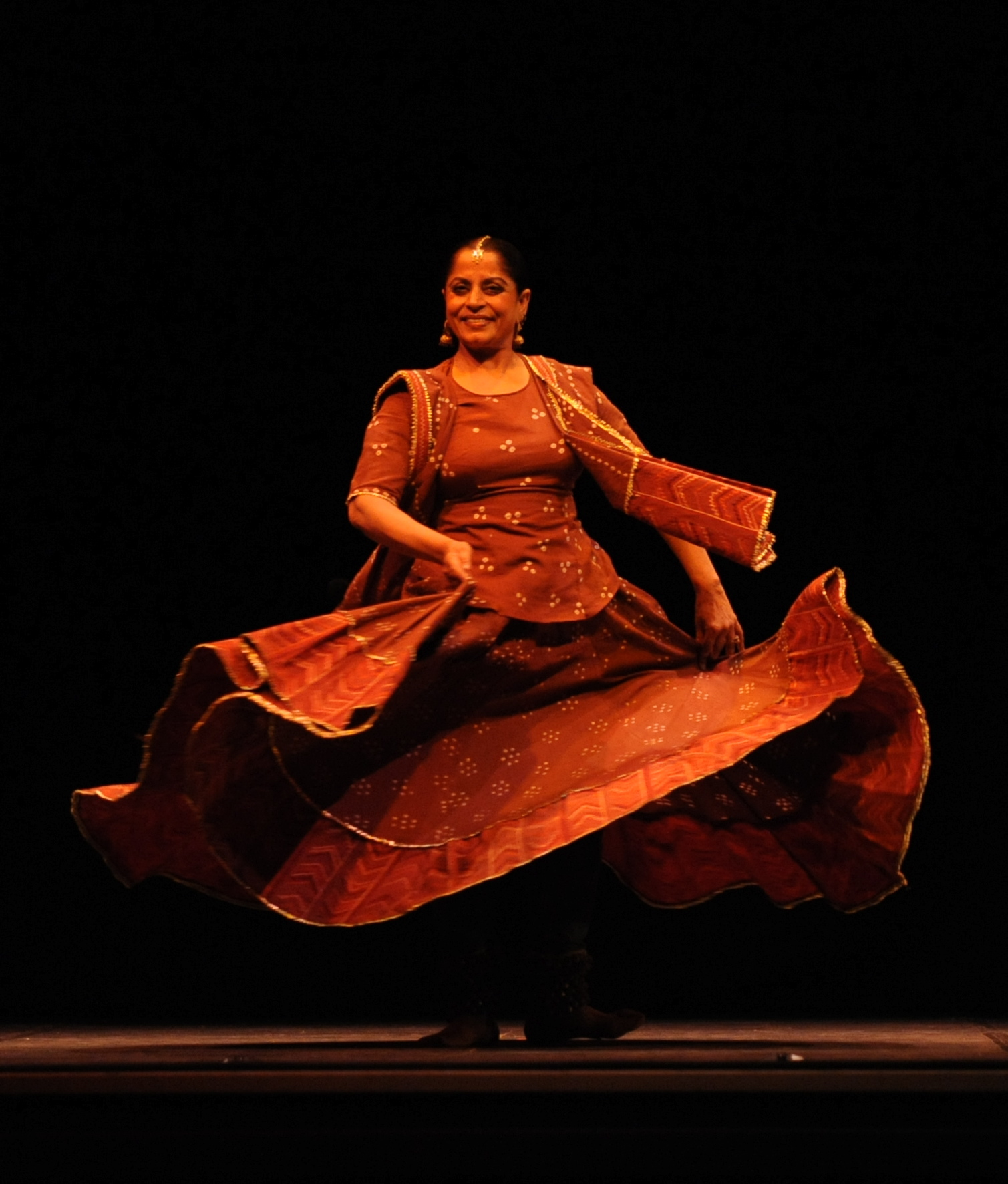
Kathak maestro Nahid Siddiqui, in Muslim dress

The dresses vary among Kathak performers and find their sources in either Hindu or Muslim culture.

The Hindu dress for female dancers has two variations. One is based on a sari, but is worn in a style different from the customary style that goes over the left shoulder. A Kathak artist generally wraps the sari around the waist and it hangs down from the left. A blouse called choli covers the upper body. The artist may wear a scarf (called orhni in some places). Hair, face, ear, neck, hand, wrist, and ankle jewelry, typically of gold, may adorn the artist. A tika or bindi in the middle of the forehead is common. The second variation of a Hindu Kathak dancer wears a either a ghagra or lehenga, a long, full (just above the ankle), light-weight skirt. It will usually have an embroidered border that helps highlight the dance motion. The skirt is contrasted with a different color choli, and a transparent scarf typically drapes over it and the dancer's head. Jewelry is typically present in the second variation.

The Muslim dress for female dancers also uses a skirt, but includes close fitting churidar pyjamas and sometimes a long coat covering hands and the upper body. The head has a cover scarf and the jewelry is light. Another variation features the Kathak dancer wearing an anarkali, a tunic with a flared skirt that can fall down to the dancer's ankles. The dancers wear churidar pyjamas or trousers underneath the anarkali.

The Hindu dress for male Kathak performers is typically a silk dhoti draped around the waist, and covered with a silk scarf tied over the top. The upper body is usually left bare or with only the Hindu thread, but is sometimes covered with a loose sleeveless jacket. Kathak male artists also wear jewellery, but often of stones and much simpler than the female artists. The Mughal dress for male Kathak performers is kurta-churidar. The kurta can be a simple one, or cut as an angarkha. There is also the possibility of adapting the angarkha or kurta for dance to incorporate wider flare in the lower portion. Particularly older variety dress includes the small peaked cap too.

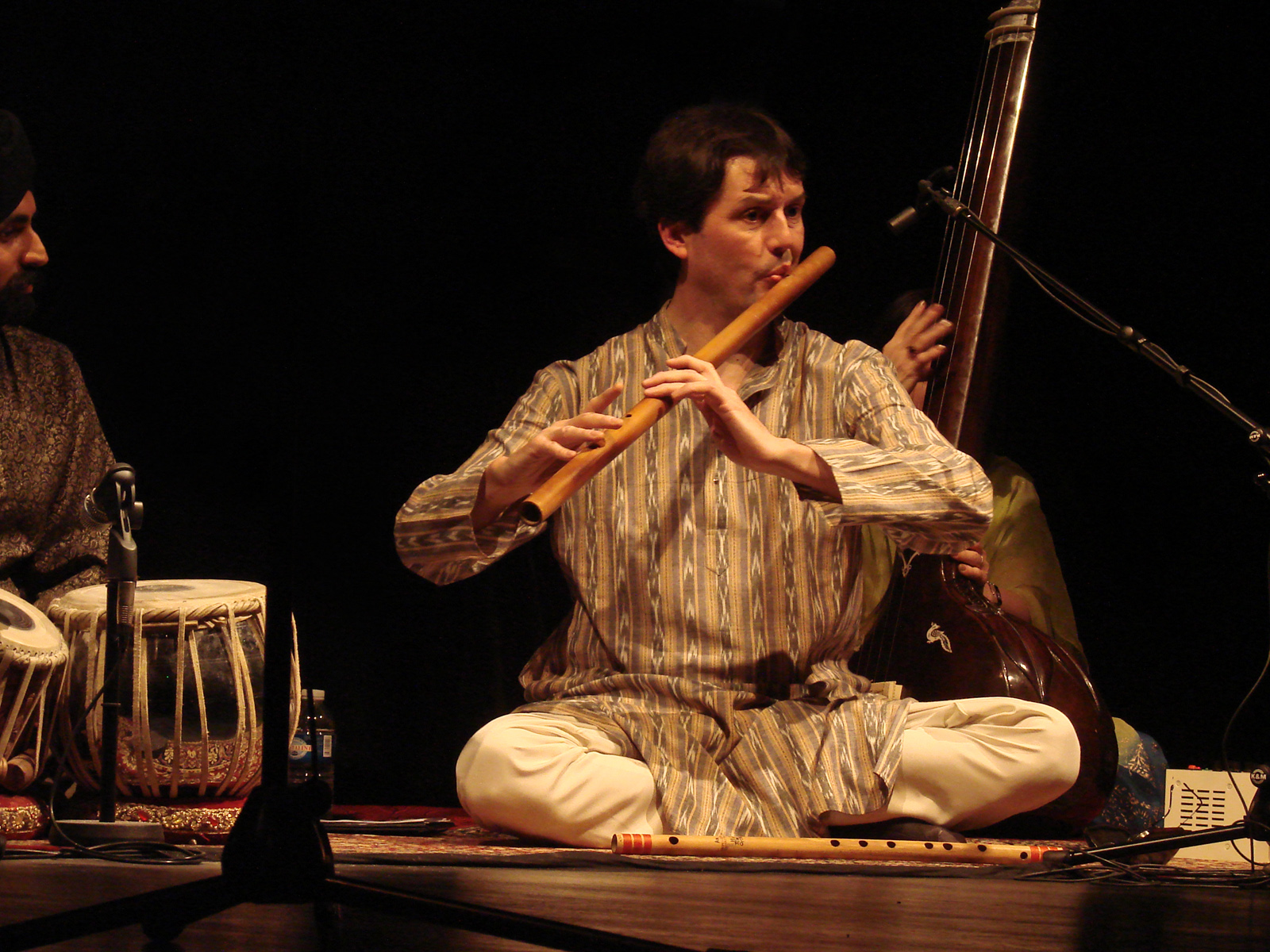
A tabla drummer and other musicians play for a Kathak dancer.

== Instruments ==
The ensemble of musical instruments vary with any Kathak performer, ranging from two to twelve classical Indian instruments, or more in versions with synthetic innovations. The most common instruments that go with Kathak are tabla (a pair of hand drums) that sync with the dancer's feet rhythms, sarangi, or harmonium with manjira (hand cymbals) that meters the tal (cycle), and other instruments to add effect, depth, and structure to the expressive stage of a Kathak performance.

== Music ==
The ancient music genre of India, Dhrupad, was re-introduced into Kathak for the first time by India's senior Kathak exponent Mahamahopadhyay Dr. Pandit Puru Dadheech. He is India's first Kathak dancer to bring back Dhrupad on the formal Kathak stage and this composition in 28 matra. Shankar Pralayankar, his Dhrupad composition, has the unique status of regularly being sung in concerts by Dhrupad maestros the Gundecha Brothers.

== Gharanas ==
Kathak is a diffuse tradition, of which four gharanas (schools) are most well known and studied – Jaipur, Varanasi, and Lucknow and Raigarh. The schools place different relative emphasis between aspects of a Kathak performance, such as the acting versus footwork. The Lucknow style, for example, emphasizes acting while Jaipur style emphasizes the dance and footwork. Traditionally, the Jaipur gharana has had a strong spiritual flavor, covering a diverse range of ideas in Vaishnavism and Shaivism.

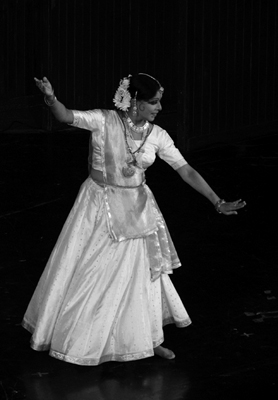
Shovana Narayan, recipient of the Padma Shri for contributions to Indian classical dance

The Jaipur gharana traces its origins to Bhanuji, a famed Shiva Tandava dancer who upon visiting Vrindavan was inspired and taught Natvari Nritya. Bhanuji's grandons Laluji and Kanhuji were similarly inspired by Krishna. They returned to Jaipur, and together they began the Jaipur gharana of Kathak. The Jaipur style developed under the sponsorship of Rajput rulers, and they favored the Kathak dance with Hindu religious themes. In the modern era, this school has continued their emphasis on dance and footwork with Jai Lal, Janki Prasad, Kundan Lal, Mohan Lal, and Nawal Kishore. This school is best known for its systematic innovations in rhythmic dancing, and the use of dance movement to express a story.

The Lucknow gharana of Kathak dance attributes its origins to a rural Krishna devotee named Ishwari from the village in southeast Uttar Pradesh, who aimed to develop Kathak dance as a form of loving devotion to Krishna. This school thrived after the Mughal Empire collapsed, when Kathak artists moved from Delhi to Lucknow under the sponsorship of Avadh nawabs who favored court dance culture. In the modern era, the Lucknow gharana style influences the dance school in New Delhi with Shambu Maharaj, Birju Maharaj, and Lacchu Maharaj. Kathak choreography there has developed themes beyond Krishna-Radha, such as those based on the drama works of Kalidasa's Shiva-Parvati and Bhavabhuti's Malati-Madhav. This school has also attempted a Hindu-Muslim Kathak fusion style, highlighting the court dancers' theme.

The Banares gharana is the third major style, traditionally believed to be the oldest. Its history is unclear. According to Kothari, the school started with Janakiprasad from a village near Jaipur who resettled in Varanasi, but one whose ancestors were famed dancers and musicians. Janakiprasad was a dancer and a Sanskrit scholar, and credited with inventing the bols of Kathak, which are mnemonic syllables within the language of this classical dance of India.

The Raigarh Ghrana is the fourth gharana, Raja Saheb introduced this style in his court where it not only focuses on the taalnag but also the finese and elegance of all the major three gharanas.

According to Nicole Lehmann, modern Kathak dancers show, to varying degrees, a fusion of the styles from all three gharanas.

== Relationship with other art forms ==
The north Indian Kathak dance differs from the south Indian Bharatanatyam in several ways, even though both have roots in the Hindu text Natya Shastra. Kathak expressions – particularly in Hindu devotional styles – are more introverted and withdrawn, while Bharatanatyam is more extroverted and expansive. Kathak is normally performed in a standing form with legs and torso typically straight, while Bharatanatyam extensively utilizes bent knee form (ara mandi, half sitting position that is somewhat similar to Demi Plié ballet move).

Kathak is also different from Kathakali, though both are Indian classical dance traditions of "story play" wherein the stories have been traditionally derived from the Hindu epics and the Puranas. Kathakali emerged in the southwestern region of India (modern Kerala) and is distinctive in its elaborate codified colorful makeup, masks, and dress. Kathakali traditionally has been troupes of predominantly male actor-dancers, who dress up as hero, heroines, gods, goddesses, demons, demonesses, priests, animals, and daily life characters. Both dance forms employ elaborate footwork, choreography, and hand gestures, but Kathakali integrates south Indian martial arts movements such as leaps and jumps. Both dance forms trace their roots to classical Sanskrit texts, but Kathakali has relatively more recent origins, more closely follows the Hastha Lakshanadeepika text, and began flourishing in the 16th century. While each has a different musical and dance language, both deploy a host of similar traditional Indian musical instruments.

According to Miriam Phillips, the Indian Kathak and the Spanish Flamenco dance share many visual, rhythmic, and kinesthetic similarities.

== Gallery ==
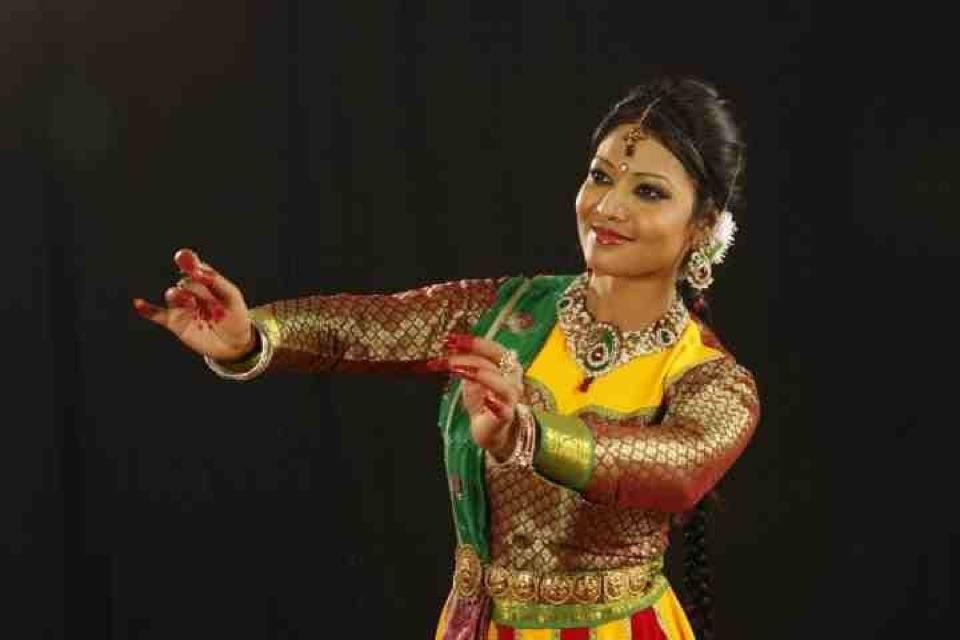
Kathak facial expressions

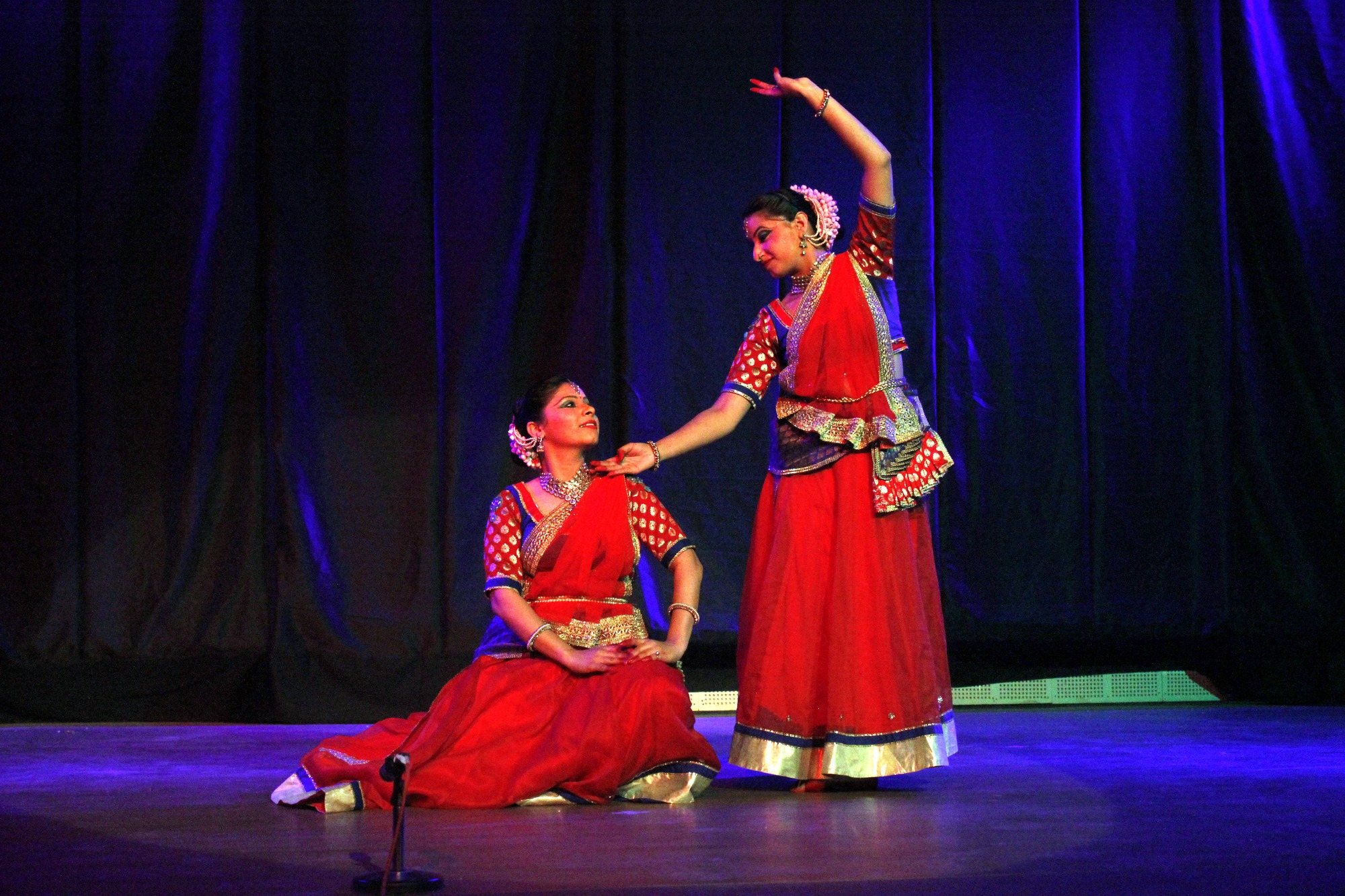
Kathak duet performance

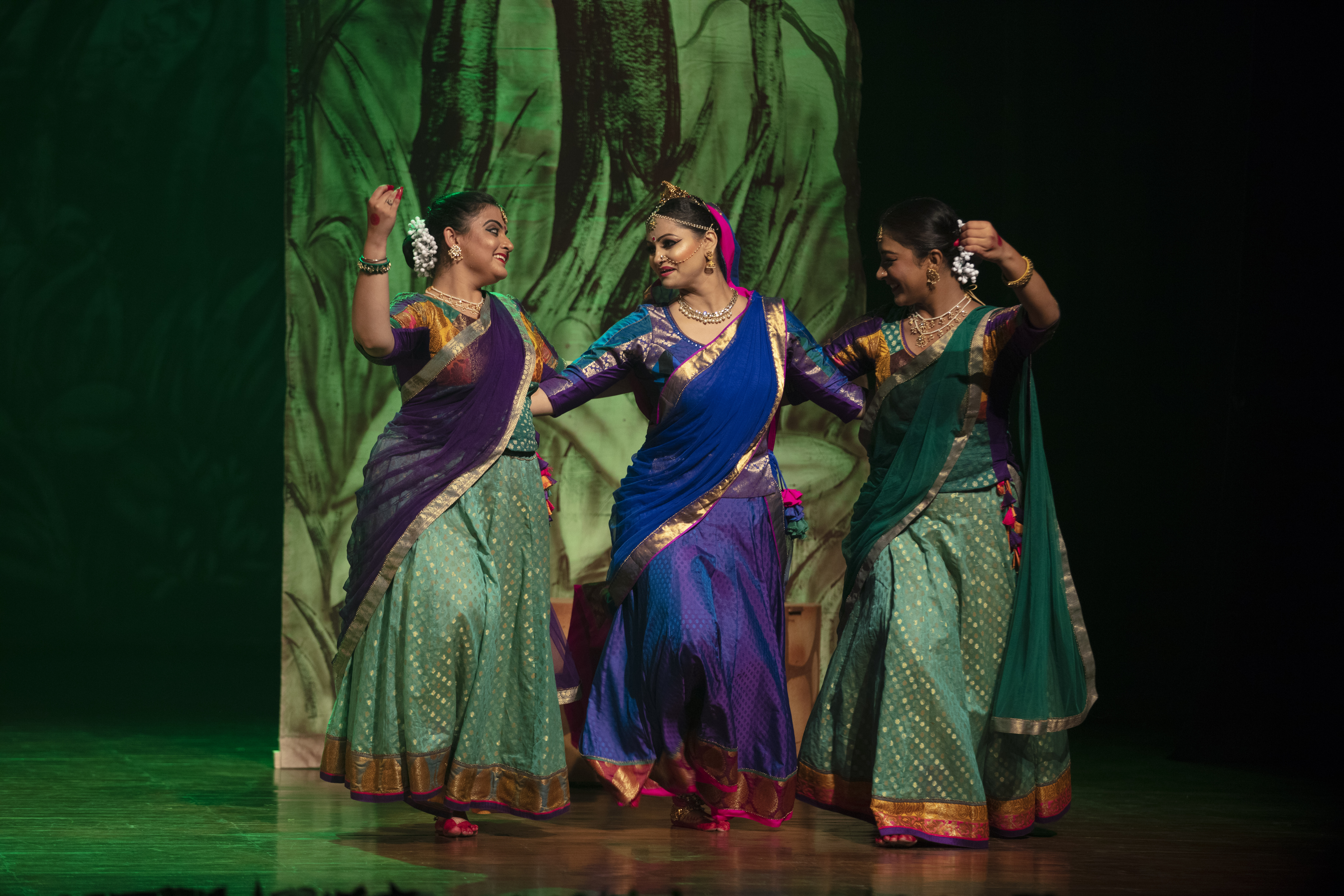
Kathak group performance

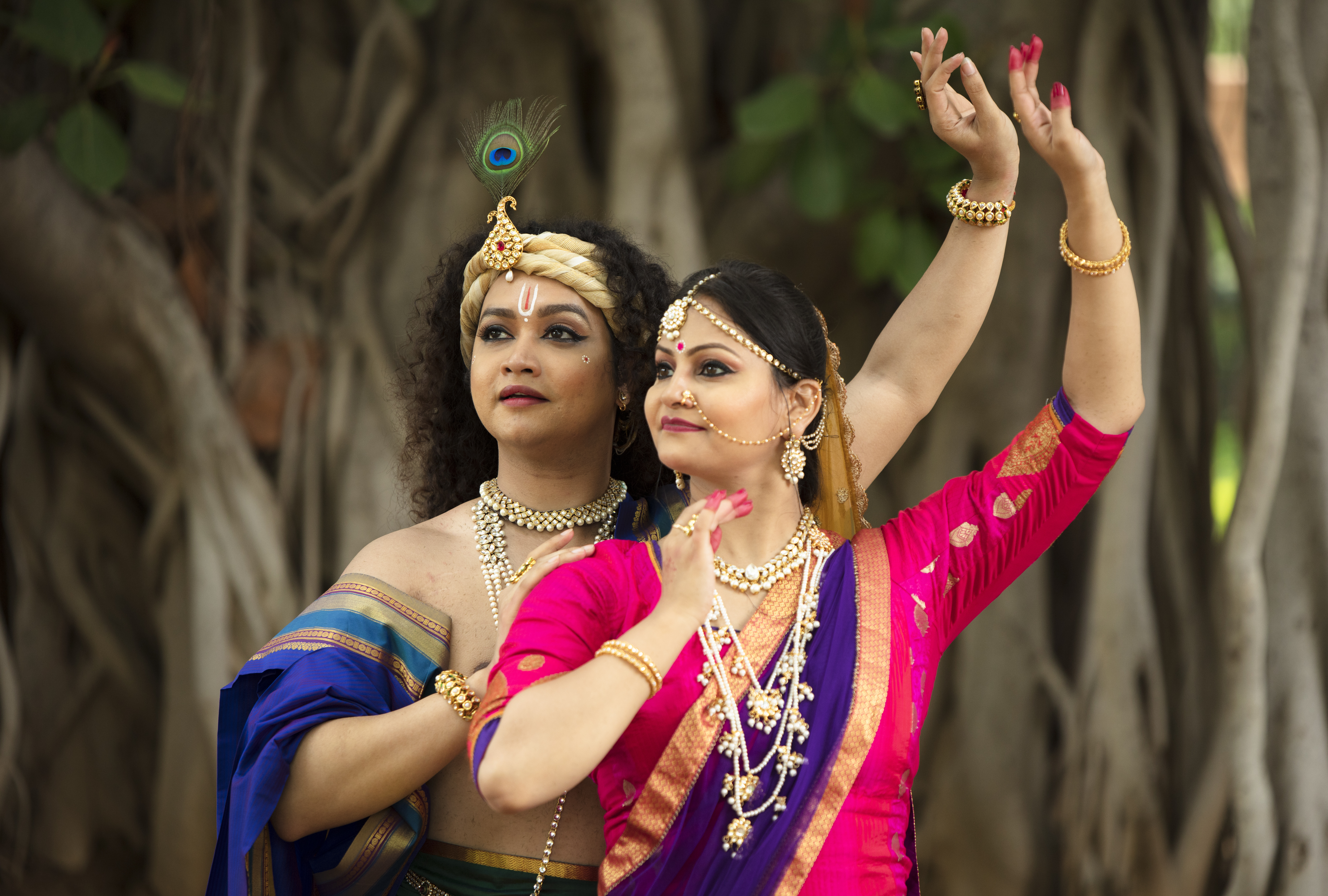
Namrata Rai and Vishal Krishna

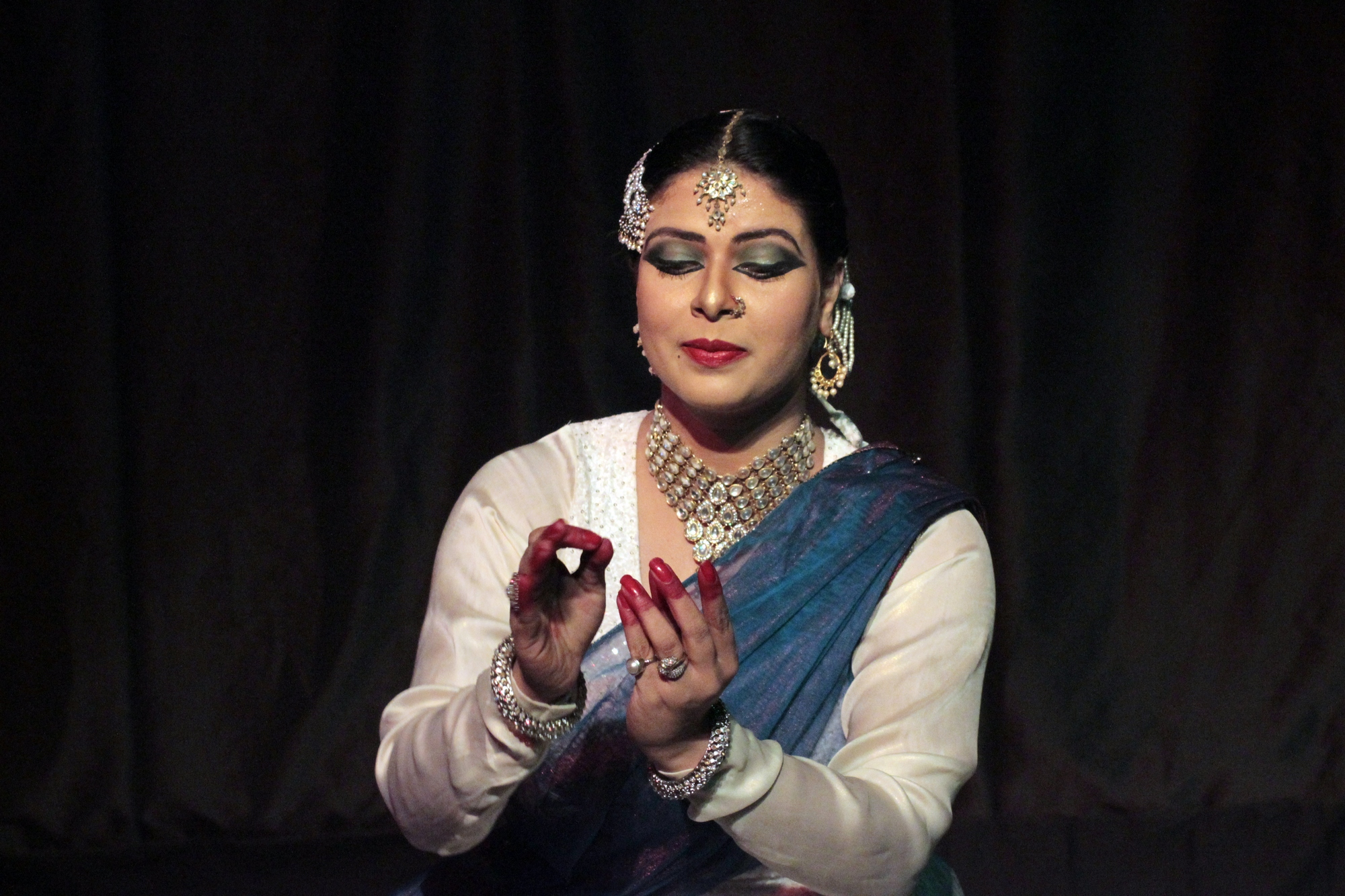
Sufi style-based Kathak

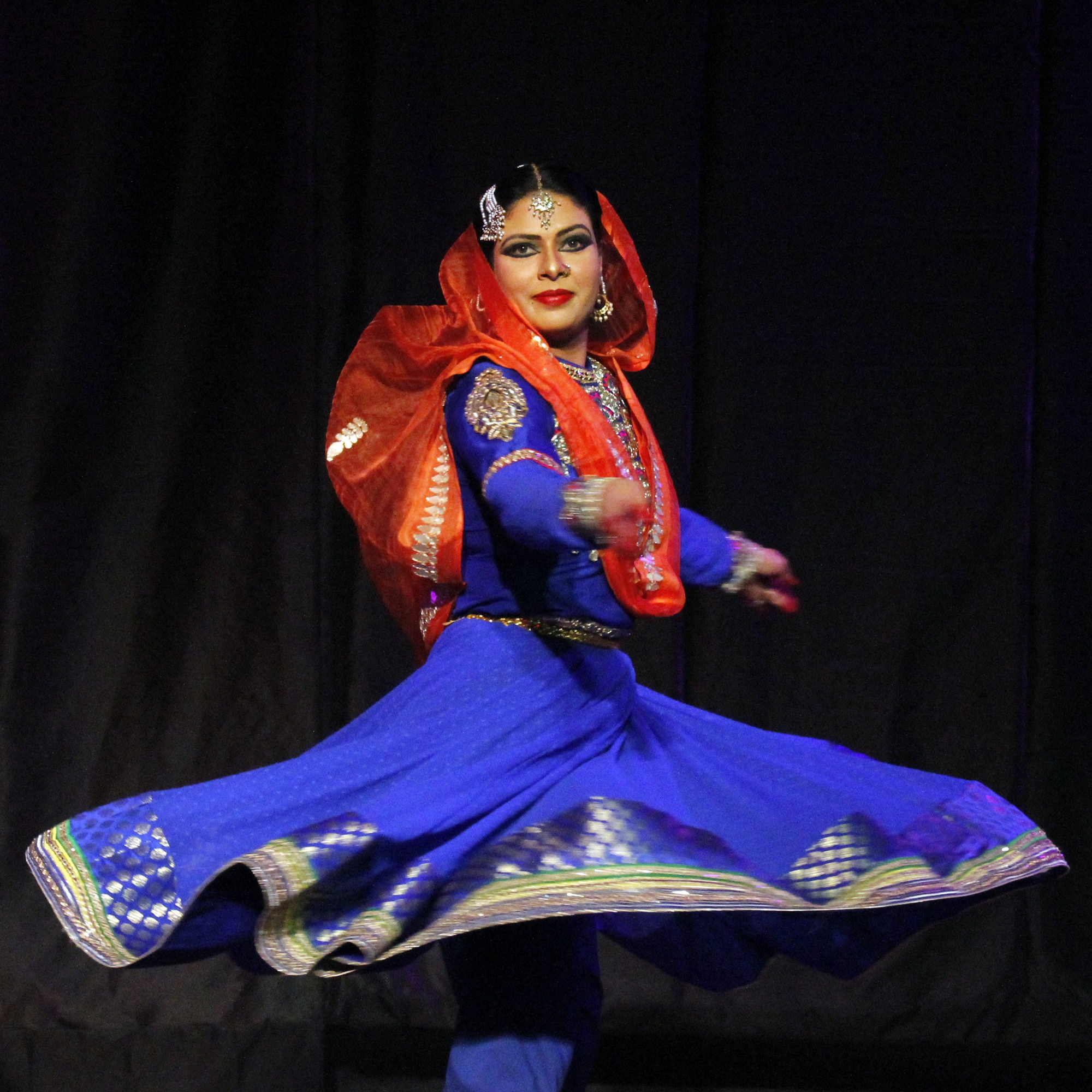
Kathak pirouettes

== See also ==
- List of Kathak exponents
- Khattak dance
