= Fariha Pervez =

Pakistani Singer

- Born: Fariha Pervez; 2 February 1974 (age 52); Lahore, Punjab, Pakistan
- Occupation: Singer
- Spouse: Married
- Awards: Pride of Performance award by the President of Pakistan in 2025

Fariha Pervez (Punjabi: فریحہ پرویز) is a Pakistani pop singer-songwriter, and music producer.

She is specially known for the rendition of various popular and famous ghazals (a form of romantic poem). She started her career anchoring and acting from a very young age on Pakistan Television. She also co-hosted the popular children's music program Aangan Aangan Taray. After the release of her debut album "Nice & Naughty", her song "Patang Baaz Sajna" (a.k.a. Bo Kata song) became an instant hit and from there, her musical career took off and she decided to focus solely on singing.

== Early life ==
Fariha Pervez was born in Lahore, Pakistan on 2 February 1974. She claims to have inherited her singing talent from her father. In 1995, Pervez joined Master Feroze Gill for classical training in music. She belongs to an artist family of Pakistani showbiz. She is the only sister of two brothers and likes to spend her spare time with her family.

== Career ==
Fariha Pervez started her career with anchoring and acting in the early 1990s but then she switched over to music in the mid-1990s. She received her classical music training from Feroz Gul and Ghulam Hassan Shaggan of Gwalior gharana. She began her career as an actress and worked in quite a few drama serials including the famous kids drama Ainak Wala Jin and Hairat Kada.

Pervez released her first music album in 1996, titled Nice & Naughty with the super-hit song 'Patangbaz Sajna'. She has released seven albums so far and has had many hit songs from each album. During her musical career, she has sung for Pakistani films such as Chief Sahib (1996), Ghunghat (1996), Sangam (1997), Inteha (1999) and Moosa Khan (2001). After acting in a few films, she realized acting was not her real interest and she then started focussing on singing.

In her early days as a singer, Fariha Pervez also appeared in the famous PTV programmes which consisted of Amir Khusrau's mystic wedding songs by the name of Woh Bahar Aayi and Chilmann. Fariha Pervez sang alongside her cousin Arifa Siddiqui, Seemi Zaidi, Shabnam Majeed and Saira Naseem. Other than that, Fariha Pervez has sung numerous drama title songs and singles as well as several songs in the popular PTV musical program "Virsa", a series of traditional musical program, produced by Yousuf Salahuddin for Pakistan Television.

Fariha Pervez herself is a fan of pop singer Sajjad Ali and Mehnaz Begum and gets her inspiration from them.

=== Passion (2005) ===
Her 6th album, Passion, was released in 2005 under Sadaf Stereo. This album contained 12 songs. The video of "Yaad Piya Ki Aaye" (Tribute to Ustad Bade Ghulam Ali Khan) was the first one directed by Jawad Bashir. This 'Thumri' also received the award for the Best Ballad in the first "The Musik Awards" (TMA).

Songs list
Song title	Music	Lyrics
Patangbaz Sajna Se (Bo Kaata song)	Mujahid Hussain	Zahid Abbas
Thora Thora Pyar	Shuja Haider	Shuja Haider
Hera Phairiyan	Sahir Ali Bagga	Anis Ahmed
Mujhe Le Ke Chal	Mehmood Khan	Mehmood Khan
Akhyan Akhyan	Sahir Ali Bagga	Anis Ahmed
Dhoondh Le Panah	Mehmood Khan	Mehmood Khan
Aa Mere Pass	Shuja Haider	Shuja Haider
Chalo Ik Saath	Amjad Bobby (Late), Sequencing: Moon	Adeen Taj
Ja Main Nai Khedna	Sahir Ali Bagga	Anis Ahmed
Mehndi Rung Li	Ifrahim	Ifrahim
Yaad Piya Ki Aaye; This thumri song was also sung by Ustad Bade Ghulam Ali Khan many years ago	Mujahid Hussain	Ayub Khawar
Mai Ni Mai	Sahir Ali Bagga	Anis Ahmed
Thora Thora Pyar (Party Mix)	Shuja Haider	Shuja Haider
O' Vela Yaad Kar	M. Arshad	Riaz ur Rehman Saghar

== Filmography ==
=== Television ===
Year	Title	Role	Network
1992	Sophia	Anila	PTV
1993	Ainak Wala Jin	Aini	PTV
1994	Daldal	Neelam	PTV
1994	Manchalay Ka Sauda	Shahida	PTV
1996	Aisi Bulandi Aisi Pasti	Zohra	PTV
1999	Comedy Theater		PTV

== Awards ==
Awards
No.	Award giving body	Award	Year	Result
1	1st Indus Music Awards	Best Song (Kokla Chapaaki); Fariha Pervez - Best female pop artist	2004	Won
2	1st Indus Music Awards	Best Female Singer of the Year	2004	Nominated
3	1st The Musik Awards	Best Ballad (Yaad Piya Ki Aaye)	2006	Won
4	1st The Musik Awards	Most Wanted Female	2006	Nominated
5	3rd Indus Music Awards	Best Female Singer of the Year	2007	Won
6	1st MTV Pakistan Music Awards	Best Female Singer of the Year	2009	Won
7	1st Pakistan Media Awards	Best Female Singer	2010	Nominated
8	2nd Pakistan Media Awards	Best Female Singer of the Year	2011	Won
9	PTV National Awards	Best Female Singer of the Year 2010	2011	Nominated
10	4th Dynamic Women's Day Awards	Special Award for Achievements in Music	2015	Won
11	Pride of Performance award by the President of Pakistan	Best Female Singer of Pakistan	2025	Won
