= Tehseen Javed =

Pakistani pop singer

- تحسین جاوید
- Born: Tehseen Javed; 12 March 1960 (age 65); Karachi, Sindh, Pakistan
- Other names: Tehsin Javed
- Occupations: Singer; Musician; Playback singer; Composer
- Years active: 1977 - present

Tehseen Javed (also spelled Tehsin Javed) (Urdu: تحسین جاوید; born 12 March 1960) is a Pakistani Pop singer and composer. He is known for his work as a playback singer in Pakistani films. He gained significant recognition for his blockbuster song "Dil Hogaya Hai Tera Dewana" from the 1995 film Mushkil.

== Early life ==
Tehseen was born in Karachi, Pakistan. Javed began his music career as a teenager in Karachi, where he was also raised. In 1977, he was discovered by Karim Shahabuddin and he invited him to PTV Karachi Center. He was studying engineering but he left it after his first semester because he was interested in singing and started singing in college. There he gave an audition and he passed it then he met Shabi Farooqui. Shabi wrote a song Mere Lafzon Ki Mehkar Tu for him but he had to go to another station for a music show then Alamgir sang the song.

Then he went to another studio and Shoaib gave him another song to sing which Alamgir was supposed to sing but he couldn't make it.

== Career ==
Tehseen Javed established himself in the Pakistani music industry with a versatile discography spanning film soundtracks, patriotic songs, and popular hits. He emerged on the music scene as a teenager and released his first pop album in 1981. His breakthrough came after singing Ahmed Rushdi's song "Bekal Raat Bitai" on PTV's Silver Jubilee Show in 1983.

Tehseen Javed had a close, personal, mentor-disciple relationship with the late, legendary Pakistani playback singer Ahmed Rushdi. They were not biologically related, but their bond was significant for Javed's early career.

Javed considered Rushdi his "Rushdi bhai" (brother) and has stated that Rushdi guided him closely during his initial days in the industry. Seasoned film director Javed Fazil reportedly referred to Tehseen Javed as Rushdi's "only true replacement" in the industry. Javed recalled moments of Rushdi traveling with him on his motorcycle, a "true filmi situation" that cemented their bond.

He is the only living singer known to have performed at Rushdi's Benefit Show in May 1982, which aimed to raise funds for Rushdi's heart surgery. Javed was heavily influenced by Rushdi's musical style; his Nigar Award-winning performance for the song "Kyun Tu Ne Mujhe Pyar Ka Paigham Diya Hai" in the 1994 film Sarkata Insaan was sung under Rushdi's clear influence.

He also did playback singing for movies including Ham Say Hay Zamana, Ustadon Kay Ustad, Mr. 420, Mr. Charlie, Sarkata Insaan, Mushkil and Suraj Pey Dastak.

Javed has achieved success across various mediums, including radio, television, films, stage, and commercial jingles, a feat previously attributed only to his mentor, Ahmed Rushdi.

Javed remains an active live performer, having participated in various international events such as the Pakistan Mela in Chicago and the Pakistan Festival in Houston.

== Personal life ==
Tehseen lives at United States and he is unmarried.

== Filmography ==
=== Television ===
Year	Title	Role	Network
1982	Rushdi's Benefit Show	Himself	PTV
1982	Shab-i-Naghma-i-Dil	Himself	PTV
1982	25th Nigar Awards	Himself	PTV
1983	Silver Jubilee	Himself	PTV
1985	Rang Tarang	Himself	PTV
1989	Eid Rang	Himself	PTV
1993	Aaj Ki Shaam	Himself	PTV
1995	Hip Hip Hurray Season 1	Himself	STN
2008	Brunch With Bushra Ansari	Himself	Geo News
2012	Bushra Ansari Show	Himself	Dunya News

=== Film ===
Year	Title	Role
1985	Ham Say Hay Zamana	Urdu
1990	Ustadon Kay Ustad	Urdu
1992	Mr. 420	Urdu
1993	Mr. Charlie	Urdu
1994	Sarkata Insaan	Urdu
1995	Mushkil	Urdu
1997	Suraj Pey Dastak	Urdu
1997	Deewane Tere Pyar Ke	Urdu
2002	Daaku	Urdu
2003	Bandish	Urdu
2024	MaXXXine	English

=== Albums ===
- "Dil Hogaya Hai Tera Dewana" (from Mushkil achieved significant international popularity)
- "Tera Naam Mera Naam"
- "Mahiya"
- "Falak Pe Dekh Raha Hoon"
- "Adal Karaein Aye Baadshah"

=== Patriotic songs ===
Tehseen had also sung many patriotic songs including "Hum Zinda Qaum Hain.

== Awards and recognition ==
Year	Award	Category	Result	Title	Ref.
1994	Nigar Awards	Best Singer	Won	Sarkata Insaan	
1995	STN Awards	Best New Talent	Won	Hip Hip Hurray Season 1	
