= Rubi Niazi =

Pakistani actress

- روبی نیازی
- Born: 18 June 1972 (age 54); Karachi, Pakistan
- Other name: Ruby Niazi
- Occupations: Actress; Model; Theatre actress
- Years active: 1991 – 2012
- Spouse: Aslam Natha (m. 1993; died 1995)
- Children: 1
- Awards: Nigar Award (1992)

Rubi Niazi (born 1972) is a Pakistani former actress and model. She is known for her performances in the movies Mr. 420 (1992), Aaj Ka Daur (1992), Behroopia (1993), Jannat (1993) and Albela Ashiq (1994). In 1992 she won Nigar Award for Best Actress for her role in the film Mr. 420.

== Early life ==
Rubi's family had migrated from India to Pakistan after the partition and settled in Karachi. Born in 1972, Rubi was raised in Karachi.

== Career ==
Rubi started working as a model for various commercials and fashion designers. Her acting career began in the theatre, where she worked with artists like Umer Sharif and Moin Akhtar. Later, she also appeared in some TV plays. Her debut film was Umer Sharif's Mr. 420, released in 1992. The film was commercially successful and opened the doors to Lollywood for her. Her later movies Aaj Ka Daur (1992) and Behroopia (1993) also performed well at the box office. During her short film career, Rubi appeared in 12 Urdu and Punjabi movies.

In 1995, she played a role in Asghar Nadeem Syed's TV series Chand Grehan.

== Personal life ==
Rubi married the filmmaker Aslam Natha and quit Lollywood. Her husband was later murdered in 1995 in Karachi. They have a daughter, who was born soon after Natha's death.

== Filmography ==
=== Television series ===
Year	Title	Role	Network
1994	Akhri Baat	Hadiqa / Jamila	PTV
1995	Chand Grehan	Shireen	STN
1997	Haeyi Jaydi	Rubi	PTV
2008	Mushkbar	Lubna	PTV
2010	Hawa Rait Aur Aangan	Naghmana	PTV

=== Telefilm ===
Year	Title	Role
2012	Roshni Ki Dastak	Mrs. Insaf

=== Film ===
Year	Film	Language
1992	Mr. 420	Urdu
1992	Aaj Ka Dour	Urdu
1993	Behrupia	Urdu
1993	Ilzam	Punjabi / Urdu
1993	Jannat	Urdu
1993	Jadoo Nagri	Punjabi / Urdu
1994	Nehla Dehla	Punjabi / Urdu
1994	Mahallaydar	Punjabi / Urdu
1994	Albela Ashiq	Urdu
1995	Mr K2	Urdu
1995	Chhupay Rustam	Punjabi / Urdu
1995	Mastana Mahi	Punjabi
1995	Naam Ki Suhagan	Urdu

== Awards and recognition ==
Year	Award	Category	Result	Film	Ref.
1992	Nigar Award	Best Actress	Won	Mr. 420	
