= Sarwat Ateeq =

Pakistani actress

- ثروت عتیق
- Born: 22 May 1949 (age 77); Lahore, Pakistan
- Education: Punjab University
- Occupations: Actress; Singer; Radio artist
- Years active: 1965 – 2010
- Spouse: Ateeq Ullah Sheikh (husband)
- Children: 2

Sarwat Ateeq is a Pakistani actress. She was among the most popular and successful Pakistani actresses of the 1970s, 1980s and 1990s. She is known for her roles in dramas Darwaza, Dukhon Ki Chadar, Mirza & Sons, Samundar, Sach Jhoot, Kaanch Ka Pul, Aankh Macholly and Guest House.

== Early life ==
Sarwat was born in 1949 on 22 May in Lahore, Pakistan. She completed her MA in journalism from Punjab University.

== Career ==
Sarwat had a passion for singing although she never learned music from anybody but she would sing songs in school ceremonies and participated in school stage dramas. In 1965 she successfully auditioned for Radio Pakistan. Sarwat participated in a children's program as a child artist. After sometime she got interested in acting and visited PTV for audition and was immediately selected by the judges.

She also acted in stages plays in addition to working on the radio. Sarwat received basic training in art from radio but since she was working in dramas and couldn't work on Radio so she left Radio. She started her career on NTV from Lahore Center and she played a major role in director Fazal Kamal's comedy show Sach Jhoot, the drama was a success and then she appeared in many more dramas.

Sarwat also worked in drama Dukhan Ki Chadar on PTV the drama was directed Yawar Hayat and Qasim Jalali which was written by Amjad Islam Amjad. Sarwat's performance was praised by viewers. She also starred in classic drama Darwaza with Asif Raza Mir, Roohi Bano and Durdana Butt the drama was very popular which was written by Munnu Bhai.

In the 1990s she worked in many dramas and her drama Guest House was popular which directed by Khalid Hafeez in which she did the role of Raheela Shameem.

In 2010 she worked in Geo TV's popular drama Thori Si Wafa Chahiye written by Syed Wasi Shah and directed by Yasir Nawaz starring with Mehwish Hayat, Iffat Rahim and Sajid Hasan.

Then she retired from acting in late 2010 and went to live with her son at Islamabad.

== Personal life ==
Sarwat is married to Ateeq Ullah Sheikh and has two children. Sarwat's husband was a program producer in radio.

== Filmography ==
=== Television ===
Year	Title	Role	Network
1971	Dastak Na Do	Geeti	PTV
1972	Sitamgar Tere Liye	Sanam	PTV
1973	Ya Naseeeb Clinic	Begum	PTV
1976	Kaliyan	Ms. Rizwan	PTV
1978	Sach Jhoot	Nighat	PTV
1979	Alif Laila	Zamurad	PTV
1979	Geetiara	Sabreen	PTV
1980	Sayeen Aur Psychiatrist	Barkat Bibi	PTV
1981	Darwaza	Zari's mother	PTV
1981	Kaanch Ka Pul	Margaret	PTV
1982	Siah Kiran	Tahira	PTV
1983	Dour-e-Junoon	Rehana	PTV
1983	Wadi-e-Purkhar	Gami	PTV
1983	Samundar	Jeeran	PTV
1984	Dukhon Ki Chadar	Bakhtu	PTV
1984	Status	Sajida	PTV
1984	Tota Kahani No: 09	Razia	PTV
1984	Mirza & Sons	Hameeda Begum	PTV
1984	Andhera Ujala	Muneer Begum	PTV
1984	Aankh Macholi	Naseem	PTV
1984	Mata-e-Gharoor	Nago	PTV
1985	Ali Baba Aor Qasim Bhai	Hafiza	PTV
1985	Drama 85	Parveen	PTV
1985	Raat Gaye	Bholan	PTV
1986	Inn Sey Miliye	Zohra	PTV
1986	Meri Saadgi Dekh	Mansoor's mother	PTV
1986	Deadline	Bari Behan	PTV
1987	Dhund Kay Us Paar	Sadia	PTV
1988	Sooraj Kay Sath Sath	Jameela	PTV
1989	Fehmida Ki Kahani Ustani Rahat Ki Zubani	Ayesha	PTV
1990	Kahani No: 10	Baji	PTV
1990	Dasht	Waheeda	PTV
1991	Guest House	Raheela Shameem	PTV
1991	Bacho Ka Park	Lady	PTV
1997	Dua	Ayesha	PTV
1998	Kahani No: 09	Shahida	PTV
2010	Thori Si Wafa Chahiye	Shagufta	Geo TV

=== Telefilm ===
Year	Title	Role
1984	Aankh Macholly	Kako

== Awards and nominations ==
Year	Award	Category	Result	Title	Ref.
1981	PTV Award	Best Actress	Nominated	Sach Jhoot	
1983	PTV Award	Best Actress	Won	Samundar	
1985	PTV Award	Best Actress	Nominated	Dukhon Ki Chadar	
1986	6th PTV Awards	Best Actress	Nominated	Raat Gaye	
1998	PTV Award	Best Actress	Nominated	Herself	
