= Sheeba Hassan =

Pakistani actress

PP Sheeba Hassan
- شیبا حسن
- Born: Sheeba Arshad; 21 May 1960 (age 66); Lahore, Pakistan
- Other name: Tomboy of The Punjabi Stage
- Occupations: TV actress; Stage actress
- Years active: 1960s – 2014
- Known for: Played the role of 'Chandi' in Sona Chandi PTV drama (1982)
- Children: 4
- Relatives: Mukhtar Begum (aunt); Farida Khanum (aunt)
- Awards: PTV Award (1983); Pride of Performance award by the President of Pakistan (2025)

Sheeba Hassan (née Arshad) is a Pakistani stage and television actress who is known for her comic role as Chandi in the TV serial Sona Chandi (1982).

== Early life ==
Sheeba was born into a family of musicians in Lahore, Pakistan. Both of her aunts, Mukhtar Begum and Farida Khanum, were well known ghazal singers of their times. She learnt classical dance from Maharaj Ghulam Hussain Kathak. She made her debut as a child artist at Radio Pakistan Lahore in the 1960s, and her first radio play was Mehtab Deen Di Baithak (Gathering With Mehtab Deen).

== Career ==
In the 1970s, she started her career as a stage artist at the Alhamra Hall, Lahore. She did many theatre and stage plays, including the play Twist, but it was a comedy role in Lada Pithi (Spoilt Girl) that made her well known in the world of theater. Sheeba worked in hundreds of stage plays, most typically Hakkay Bakkay. Because of her sharp wit and Punjabi-language acting, she was known as Mahi Munda (Tomboy of the Punjabi Stage).

She earned fame by starring as Chandi in Munnu Bhai's TV serial Sona Chandi, which was aired in 1982 on PTV. She was paired with actor Hamid Rana who acted as Sona in the play. Later, she appeared in another of Munnu Bhai's plays, Ababeel. She also continued participating in stage dramas until she announced retirement in 2014.

On 23 March 2025, the Government of Pakistan honored her with the Presidential Pride of Performance for her contributions to the television Industry.

== Personal life ==
Sheeba got married in the late 1980s and has four children.

== Filmography ==
=== Television series ===
- Aik Mohabbat So Afsanay as Zahira (1973)
- Dastaan-e-Habib as Feroza (1974)
- Ajar-e-Aswad as Bua Ji (1975)
- Alif Noon as Sakina (1982)
- Sona Chandi as Chandi (1982)
- Jokar Pokar (1989)
- Dareechay (1990)
- Ahsas Aur Kamtari as Razia (1991)
- Keh Jaaan Mein Koon as Nazeera (1992)
- Damad (1993)
- Ababeel as Nagina (1994)

=== Other appearance ===
Year	Title	Role	Network
2011	Jee Saheeli	Herself	A-Plus
2017	Salam Zindagi	Herself	ARY Zindagi
2022	G-Sarkar	Herself	Neo News

== Awards and nominations ==
Year	Award	Category	Result	Title	Ref.
1983	PTV Award	Best actress	Won	Sona Chandi	
2025	Pride of Performance	Award by the President of Pakistan	Won	Arts	
