= Guest House (TV series) =

- Genre: Comedy drama
- Written by: Mustansar Hussain Tarar; Adeem Hashmi; Rauf Khalid; Arif Waqar; Ahmad Daud; Doctor Tariq Aziz; Sarwat Ateeq; Hamid Rana; Nasir Baloch; Mansha Yaad
- Directed by: Shakir Uzair; Farooq Qaiser; Iqbal Ansari; Arif Rana
- Starring: Afzal Khan; Khalid Hafeez; Sarwat Ateeq; Nasir Iqbal; Tariq Malik; Nabeela Khan; Ghazala Butt; Laila Zuberi; Hamid Rana
- Country of origin: Pakistan
- Original language: Urdu
- No. of episodes: 52

Production
- Running time: 50 minutes

Original release
- Network: Pakistan Television Corporation
- Release: 1991 – 1992

Guest House (Urdu script: گیسٹ ہاؤس) is a 1991 Pakistani comedy-drama series directed by Shakir Uzair and broadcast on PTV from 1991 to 1992. The setting is Welcome Guest House, a fictional guest house in a posh area of Islamabad. It is run by Mr. Shameem and his wife with the help of three regular employees, Naveed, Murad, and Rambo.

== Plot ==
Every episode starts with the arrival of new guests and the involvement of the guest house's employees in their comic and tragic situations. Almost all the episodes end with the guest's problems solved with the help of all-too-readily helpful employees and reluctant owners of the guest house.

=== Pilot episode ===
The pilot episode introduces the janitor of the guest house, 'John Rambo', in a very dramatic way. He is holding a janitor's wiper like a rifle or machine gun, and thrilling background music is playing. The camera moves in a way that the wiper actually looks like a rifle at the beginning of the scene. Later, it turns out that 'John Rambo, Cockroach Killer' is inspired by the main character of the Hollywood movie First Blood.

The character of Rambo was an instant hit and played a vital role in the popularity of the series. Producers wanted to remove the character after the pilot episode, but his success made them decide otherwise. One of the producers admitted on TV that after the success of Rambo in the pilot episodes, he was the focus of every episode.

== Characters ==
All the main characters associated with the guest house are shown as very simple people and, on several occasions, have been fooled by charlatans posing as PEERS (fake jogis) or film directors. They tend to get involved in the personal matters of their guests and try to resolve their issues.

=== Mr. Shameem ===
Mr. Shameem (played by Khalid Hafeez) is the founder and owner of the guest house. Although he is very faithful to his wife, she always suspects him of having an affair or having another wife, mostly because he likes to flirt and has been caught doing so on many occasions, especially with small-time female celebrities who stay at the guest house. He is very stingy and doesn't like his wife's occasional shopping sprees, which are the main cause of their domestic problems.

Mr. Shameem is a good businessman. He is always ready to please his guests and tries to meet their often outrageous demands. He is a strict taskmaster and often deducts small amounts from the salaries of his employees in order to punish them.

Unlike his employees, he does not like to get involved in his guests' personal problems. However, he often finds himself in situations where he has to get involved to bail out his employees and save the reputation of his guest house.

=== Mrs. Raheela Shameem ===
Mrs. Shameem (played by Sarwat Ateeq) is married to Mr. Shameem and is always addressed as Mrs. Shameem, never by her first name, except in episode 3, where an old college friend reveals her first name to be Raheela. She is very outspoken and has no qualms about expressing her opinions, even if it means disapproval of the guests. She has almost the same powers in the matters of the guest house as her husband, but she scarcely uses them. She loves shopping and complains that her husband is stingy and doesn't support her shopping. She is often nostalgic about her youth and remembers the long hair she used to have. She is compassionate and easily gets involved in the personal matters of the guests. She often takes sides with the women in huests' domestic disputes. She can easily find the reflections of her own personal life in the personal problems of others.

She is very soft on the employees, often takes their side, and tries to stop her husband from punishing them. She even hid Rambo in a room when he was fired by her husband. Later, she persuaded Mr. Shameem to rehire him.

=== Murad ===
Murad (played by Tariq Malik) is the 'bell boy' of the guest house. He hums "TIP TIP karta mein kumray mein aata hoon" when walking around the guest house. He drops subtle hints to the guests in order to get tips from them. He often starts a conversation with a guest, asking if they know English, and then proceeds to ask if they know what T-I-P stands for. His other pet phrase is "easy feel" which he uses in many different contexts.

=== John Rambo ===
John Rambo (played by Afzal Khan) is the janitor of the guest house. He is an illiterate person and belongs to a village in the suburbs of the city. He is simple and honest and has very high self-esteem. He never accepts any tips and feels offended when they are offered. He can be easily persuaded into anything if he feels it is morally right. In one episode, he goes on a mission against pollution and is beaten when he tries to stop a pop concert to prevent noise pollution.

He is obsessed with Hollywood action movies, the Rambo series in particular, and wants to be an action film hero. Many guests have tried to exploit his ambition for movies, often costing him financial losses. He wears a sleeveless black T-shirt with a skull and crossbones and a pair of loose orange pajamas. He has a butterfly tattoo on each arm.

He has a strange style of introducing himself. He crosses his arms, keeping them at a small distance from his body, poses his head at an angle to his torso, and says this English-language sentence in the local accent: "My name is Rambo Rambo, John Rambo, Silver Stallone, Cockroach Killer." He always mispronounces "Sylvester Stallone" as "Silver Stallone." When he is excited, he adds "After Kar" at the beginning of his signature sentence. This is a combination of "After All" and "Aakhir Kar" (Urdu: آخر کار). Both of these phrases have the same meanings in English and Urdu, respectively.

He always wears a janitor's wiper like a rifle on his back. His well-intentioned misadventures and indulgence in the private lives of the guests often put him in trouble with Mr. Shameem, and Mrs. Shameem comes to his rescue, who has sisterly affection for him.

He has a fiancée named Jeeran who lives in his village. He often daydreams about her, while working.

Rambo, after giving his best performance in Guest House, became very popular in Pakistan and then suddenly became a Lollywood star and played many lead and supporting roles in Pakistani movies. During his successful film career, he proposed to his fellow actress Sahiba (the daughter of the famous actress Nisho) and later married her. Now she is known as Sahiba Afzal in the Pakistani film industry.

=== Bau Naveed ===
Naveed (played by Nasir Iqbal) is the manager of the guest house. Nasir Iqbal also performed Lala Peshori and Mr. Guide (very popular characters) of Kaliyan and Uncle Sargam shows. Nowadays he is living in Dallas, Texas. He is now started a you tube channel (visit America - Nasir Iqbal). He won the best supporting actor award from Pakistan Television in 1999.

=== Nazia ===
Raheela Shameem's sister (played by Nabeela Khan) and sister-in-law to Mr. Shameem.

=== Begum ===
Noshi's mother (played by Ghazala Butt) and wife to Mumtaz.
