= Hamid Rana =

Pakistani television actor

- Born: 5 June 1957 (age 69); Arifwala, Punjab, Pakistan
- Known for: Played the role of 'Sona' in Sona Chandi PTV drama (1982)
- Children: 2
- Awards: Pride of Performance award by the President of Pakistan in 2025

Hamid Rana (Punjabi: حامد راݨا, Urdu: حامد رانا) is a Pakistani television actor and also appeared in Lollywood films. He started his acting career in the 1970s. He gained immense popularity through his performances in various television drama serials and later went on to act in movies as well.

However, it was his portrayal of the character Sona in the Pakistan Television drama serial Sona Chandi (1982) that won him critical acclaim. The show, written by Munnu Bhai and directed by Rashid Dar and Shahzad Khalil, was a massive hit with audiences of all ages and became one of the most-watched television drama serials of its time in Pakistan.

== Early life and career ==
Hamid Rana, born into a Punjabi Rajput family, belongs to the city of Arifwala in Pakpattan district, Punjab, Pakistan. His performance and portrayal of the character Sona in the drama serial Sona Chandi was highly praised by critics and audiences alike. In particular, he was reviewed positively for his ability to emotionally connect his character with the audiences. His chemistry with co-star, Sheeba Hassan, who played the role of Chandi, was also widely appreciated, with the duo becoming a popular on-screen couple of Pakistani television. The serial itself revolved around a village-dwelling couple who migrate to the city in order to settle debts their family needs to repay. This comedy-drama showed us the lives of the elite through the eyes of the poor, highlighting moral values with a tinge of humour. They worked as domestic helpers but helped solve other people's problems.

Hamid Rana also acted in another comedy play by the name of Ya Naseeb Clinic during the black and white television era. In 2011, he completed a drama project titled Girjaan under the banner of Rana Productions.

== Filmography ==
=== Television ===
Year	Drama	Role	Writer	Director	Network	Notes
1975	Ya Naseeb Clinic	Mad			PTV	
1982	Sona Chandi	Sona			PTV	
1984	Khul Ja Sim Sim	Feroz (photographer)			PTV	Long-play
1986	Deadline	Clerk			PTV	Long-play
1986	Ababeel	Mundri			PTV	
1987	Mohallay Daar	Jachho	Yes		PTV	
1991	Halchal	Aleem	Yes		PTV	Guest House
1991	Noora Kushti	Tufail Geeta Pehlwan	Yes		PTV	Guest House
1991	Status	Family elder	Yes		PTV	Guest House
1994	Taangay Waala	Hero			PTV	Punjabi
1997	Akkhar	Ashraf			PTV	Punjabi
1999	Budha Trunk Aur Boski	Akbar			PTV	Comedy Theater
1999	Jany Na Paye	Basheer			PTV	Comedy Theater
1999	High Jump	Sultan			PTV	Comedy Theater
1999-2000	Aahlna	Chauhdary Salamat			PTV	Punjabi
2000	Sahib Sarkar	Faqiria			PTV	
2004	Neela Aasman				PTV	
2006	Toba Tek Singh	Mad			PTV	Telefilm
2008	Bandiwan	Warayam			PTV	Telefilm
2009	Saaray Gaamay	Abdur Rahman Khan			PTV	Comedy
2011	Girjaan	Zafar	Yes	Yes	PTV	Telefilm
2021	Aslam Ka Gaon	Baseer			PTV	

=== Films ===
Year	Title	Role	Language	Notes
1981	Muftbar	Surli	Punjabi	Supporting role

== Awards and recognition ==
- Pride of Performance award by the President of Pakistan for his contributions as an actor.

== See also ==
- List of Lollywood actors
- Sona Chandi (1982)
