= Insaf Ho To Aisa =

1998 film

- Directed by: Masood Butt
- Starring: Babar Ali; Reema Khan; Saud; Neeli; Sahiba Afzal; Jan Rambo; Shaan Shahid
- Music by: Tafoo
- Release date: 1998
- Country: Pakistan

Insaf Ho To Aisa is a 1998 comedy Pakistani film directed by Masood Butt, featuring Babar Ali, Reema Khan, Saud (actor), Neeli, Sahiba Afzal, Jan Rambo and Shaan Shahid.

It was released on 30 January 1998.

Film music was scored by Tafoo and the film song lyrics were by Saeed Gilani. The same year, the hit film Nikaah also was released starring Reema and Shaan.
