= Nabeela Khan =

Pakistani actress

- Born: 20 October 1963 (age 62); Rawalpindi, Pakistan
- Education: University of Rawalpindi
- Occupation: Actress
- Years active: 1986 –present
- Spouse: Jahangir Khan (divorced)
- Children: Sajawal Khan (son); Areej Khan (daughter)

Nabeela Khan is a Pakistani actress. She is known for her roles in dramas Muqaddar, Inkaar, Ishqiya, Shehnai and Nand.

== Early life ==
Nabeela was born in 1968 in Rawalpindi, Pakistan. She completed her studies from University of Rawalpindi.

== Career ==
Nabeela started working at PTV Peshawar Centre when she went there to visit with her mother. There a producer Masood Ahmed Shah cast her in a drama. Then she also worked at Radio and after that she made her debut in the PTV drama Hisar in 1986. She was noted for her roles in the dramas Guest House, Talash, Faisla and Gul-e-Lala. She also appeared in dramas Ehd-e-Wafa, Inkaar, Main Khwab Bunti Hon and Dil Tanha Tanha. Since then she has appeared in dramas Ishqiya, Aurat Kahani, Muqaddar, Nand, Pehli Si Muhabbat and Shehnai.

== Personal life ==
Nabeela was married to actor Jahangir Khan "Jani" and has three children, but they later divorced. Nabeela's son Sajawal Khan is also an actor.

== Filmography ==
=== Television ===
Year	Title	Role	Network
1986	Hisar	Gulrukh	PTV
1990	Mosamon Ki Dhoop	Reema	PTV
1991	Guest House	Nazia	PTV
1991	Gul-e-Lala	Zarmina	PTV
1992	Talash	Nazo	PTV
1993	Khwab Raastey	Jan	PTV
1993	Faisla	Bibi	PTV
1994	Bisat	Ayesha	PTV
1995	Shakhsaar	Muneeba	PTV
1996	Khwab Kam Khwab	Bibi Gi	PTV
1996	Aahan	Nabeela	PTV
1999	Jaa Gyar	Sultana	PTV
2019	Ehd-e-Wafa	Haris's mother	Hum TV
2019	Inkaar	Shayan's mother	Hum TV
2019	Main Khwab Bunti Hon	Safia	Hum TV
2020	Barish Mein Aag	Asia	LTN Family
2020	Dil Tanha Tanha	Tarbiyah	Hum TV
2020	Ishqiya	Mrs. Kashif	ARY Digital
2020	Muqaddar	Salma	Geo Entertainment
2020	Nand	Amna	ARY Digital
2021	Shehnai	Bushra	ARY Digital
2021	Pehli Si Muhabbat	Nabila	ARY Digital
2023	Aurat Kahani	Faria's mother	SAB TV
2023	Subh-e-Nau	Jawad's mother	PTV
2023	Mohabbat Ki Akhri Kahani	Zubaida	Express Entertainment
2023	Namak Haram	Uzma	Hum TV
2024	Khaie	Lalarukh	Geo Entertainment
2024	Kaisi Hai Ye Ruswai	Arifa	Express Entertainment

=== Web series ===
Year	Title	Role	Notes
2022	Ruswaye	Nazia	

=== Telefilm ===
Year	Title	Role
1990	Court Say Court Tak	Saeeda

=== Film ===
Year	Title	Role
2022	Ay Ishq Zara Rang De	Ami Ji

== Awards and nominations ==
Year	Award	Category	Result	Title	Ref.
1999	PTV Award	Best Actress	Won	Khwab Kam Khwab	
2022	2nd TVM Star Awards	Best Versatile Actress	Won	Star Awards Committee	
