= Wadi-e-Purkhar =

Pakistani television series

- Title screen
- وادی پُرخار
- Genre: Family; Drama
- Written by: Younus Javed
- Directed by: Mohammad Nisar Hussain
- Starring: Khalida Riyasat; Usman Peerzada; Sarwat Ateeq; Asif Raza Mir; Khursheed Shahid
- Country of origin: Pakistan
- Original language: Urdu

Production
- Producer: Mohammad Nisar Hussain

Original release
- Network: PTV
- Release: 1983

Wadi-e-Purkhar (Urdu: وادی پُرخار, lit. 'Thorny Valley') is a 1983 Pakistani television Urdu long play written by Younus Javed and produced and directed by Mohammad Nisar Hussain for PTV.

== Synopsis ==
The story is about Najma and Naseeruddin who are friends at college and later get married. Najma faces a hard time getting used to the traditions of Naseeruddin's family. She meets Gami who tells Najma that she is afflicted with a sickness, which makes Najma sad. Zaibunnisa usually finds every way to give Najma a hard time but much to her sadness her husband dies and she raises her son Ahmar alone. Zaibunnisa and Karam-Un-nisa then demand Najma to give them Ahmar who is heir to his father's wealth but she refuses.

== Cast ==
- Khalida Riyasat as Najma
- Usman Peerzada as Naseeruddin
- Sarwat Ateeq as Gami
- Asif Raza Mir as Ahmar
- Samina Khalid as Jeevni
- Khursheed Shahid as Zaibunnisa
- Nighat Butt as Karam-Un-Nisa
- Ismat Tahira as Rahat
- Durdana Butt as Sughra
- Abid Butt as Rafi Ahmed
- Jameel Fakhri as Hakim Ali
- Mian Azam as Ahmed Khan
- Farzana Siddiqui as Rajida
- Tehrim Math as Sajida
- Ejaz Qaiser as Jamal
- Wasim Gohar as Shafique
- Javed Akhtar as Noora
- Nazar Abbas as Chabba
- Asim Bukhari as Professor
- Nasir Butt as Ahmed
- Kazim Raza as Student
- M.A. Khan as Judge
- Javed Piya as Belaf
- Heema as Nasira

== Accolades ==
Year	Award	Category	Name	Result	Ref.
1989	PTV Awards	Best Actress	Khalida Riyasat	Won	
