= Afzaal Ahmad =

Pakistani actor (died 2022)

Syed Afzaal Ahmad
- سید افضال احمد
- Born: 1940; Jhang, Punjab, British India (now Pakistan)
- Died: 2 December 2022 (aged 81–82); Lahore, Punjab, Pakistan
- Occupation: Actor
- Years active: 1971–2012
- Notable work: International Gorillay, Hell’s Ground, Sharif Badmash

Syed Afzaal Ahmad (سید افضال احمد; 1940 – 2 December 2022) was a Pakistani film and television actor mostly known for his supporting roles across Urdu and Punjabi cinema. He appeared in over 200 films, including International Gorillay and Hell's Ground. A graduate of Government College Lahore, he also ran Lahore's Tamaseel Theatre and was active in the entertainment industry for over five decades.

== Early life and education ==
Syed Afzaal Ahmad was born in Jhang, Punjab, Pakistan, around 1940–42.

He completed his schooling at the prestigious Aitchison College in Lahore and later earned a Bachelor of Arts degree from Government College, Lahore.

During his college years, Ahmad began acting in radio plays and early PTV dramas, starting with works by Ashfaq Ahmad. He gained audience recognition even before graduating.

== Career ==
=== Radio and theatre ===
Afzaal Ahmad began his career in the late 1960s, initially performing in radio dramas and theatre while studying at Government College, Lahore.

Away from his acting career, he owned and operated Lahore's Tamaseel Theatre, one of the first venues in Pakistan to feature a revolving stage. He invested in modern lighting and sound technology and produced popular plays such as Muhabbaton Kay Musafair and Janam Janam Ki Maili Chadar.

=== Cinema and television ===
His transition to television came through early PTV serials, often working with writers like Ashfaq Ahmad and Bano Qudsia.

He made his film debut in 1971 and went on to appear in more than 200 films in Urdu, Punjabi, and Pashto. Notable films include International Gorillay (1990), in which he played a prominent supporting role, as well as Sharif Badmash, Ilaqa Incharge, and Hell's Ground (2007), a cult horror film in which he played a rare late-career role in English-language cinema.

Ahmad was known for portraying authoritative and dignified characters, often cast as judges, police officers, or feudal lords, contributing to his image as a serious and graceful performer.

He remained active in the same industry for over five decades, spanning Pakistan's golden age of cinema through its decline and digital-era revival.

== Later years and death ==
In 2001, Ahmad suffered a serious brain hemorrhage followed by a stroke, which led to long-term speech impairment and paralysis. He continued to live at his Lahore farmhouse with close family support until his death in 2022. Despite his illness, he received care from immediate family but faced periods of social and financial isolation due to health setbacks.

On 2 December 2022, Ahmad died at Lahore General Hospital after suffering from a brain hemorrhage.

== Selected filmography ==
Among others, Afzal Ahmad starred in the following films:

Year	Title	Language	Notes
1973	Anmol	Urdu	One of his earliest known film roles
1974	Khatarnak	Urdu	
1982	Charda Suraj	Punjabi	
1984	Doorian	Urdu	Popular social drama
1987	Moti Sher	Punjabi	Action film
1990	International Guerillas	Urdu	Political satire
1993	Mr. Charlie	Urdu	Comedy
2012	Shareeka	Punjabi	Final film appearance
