= Thori Si Wafa Chahiye =

Pakistani television series

- Original title: تھوڑی سی وفا چاہیے
- Written by: Syed Wasi Shah
- Directed by: Yasir Nawaz
- Starring: Iffat Rahim; Sajid Hasan; Mehwish Hayat
- Opening theme: Rahat Fateh Ali Khan
- Country of origin: Pakistan
- Original language: Urdu
- No. of episodes: 18

Production
- Producer: Hassan Zia
- Production company: Mastermind Productions

Original release
- Network: Geo Entertainment
- Release: 18 March – 15 July 2010

Thori Si Wafa Chahiye is a Pakistani television series directed by Yasir Nawaz, written by Syed Wasi Shah, and first broadcast on Geo Entertainment. It stars Iffat Rahim, Sajid Hasan, and Mehwish Hayat in the lead roles. The series depicts the impact of extra-marital affairs on all concerned.

The series received two nominations at the 11th Lux Style Awards, including Best TV Actor for Hasan and Best TV Director for Nawaz.

== Plot ==
There is a lack of understanding between the married couple, Rania and Sheraz. Sheraz is a corrupt government officer and has two children with Rania. The dispute between them and the arrogant nature of Sheraz result in their divorce. He later marries his beautiful and young colleague, Mehreen, who belongs to a poor family. Rania also moves on with her life and marries a nice guy, Jasim. Sheraz is then dismissed due to corruption charges. To save his assets from confiscation, he transfers his assets to his new father-in-law. After several investigations, he is sent to prison but later comes out after making a deal, according to which he is terminated permanently from the job. He goes to Mehreen who has now started an affair with Sheraz's assistant and asks for his property back, which she refuses to part with.

== Cast ==
- Iffat Rahim as Rania
- Sajid Hasan as Sheraz
- Mehwish Hayat as Mehreen
- Adnan Siddiqui as Jasim
- Akhtar Hasnain as Arif
- Shamoon Abbasi as Police
- Qaiser Naqvi as Dadi
- Sarwat Ateeq as Shagufta

== Reception ==
Dawn praised the performances of the lead cast, especially of Hasan's acting, but criticised the violent scenes.

== Accolades ==
Year	Award	Category	Recipient(s)/ nominee(s)	Result	Ref.
2011	Lux Style Awards	Best Television Director	Yasir Nawaz	Nominated	
2011	Lux Style Awards	Best Television Actor - Satellite	Sajid Hasan	Nominated	
