= Samina Khalid =

Pakistani actress

- ثمینہ خالد
- Born: Samina Khalid; 10 February 1962 (age 64); Lahore, Punjab, Pakistan
- Occupations: Dancer; Actress; Radio artist
- Years active: 1981 – 2011
- Awards: PTV Award (2003)

Samina Khalid (Punjabi: ثمینہ خالد) is a Pakistani television actress. She is known for playing comic roles in PTV's dramas Dhoop Dewar (1982), Khawaja and Son (1985) and Ainak Wala Jin (1993).

== Career ==
She participated in many dramas and programs at the Radio Pakistan and PTV Lahore center during the 1980s and the 1990s. Her portrayal of the character Nabeela in Ata ul Haq Qasmi's serial Khawaja and Son is regarded as classic. Her way of pronouncing "Jawad Jee", and pronunciation of alphabet "Ṛe" were quite humorous.

== Filmography ==
=== Television series ===
Year	Drama	Role	Channel	Notes
1982	Dhoop Dewar	Noreen	PTV	Long-play
1982	Alif Laila	Seemi	PTV	
1982	Sona Chandi	Batool	PTV	
1982	Alif Noon	Zareena	PTV	
1983	Wadi-e-Purkhar	Jeevni	PTV	Long-play
1985	Khawaja and Son	Nabeela	PTV	
1988	Sooraj Kay Sath Sath	Husan Ara	PTV	
1991	Patt Jhar	Chheemo	PTV	
1993	Zameen	Shadaan	PTV	
1993	Ainak Wala Jin	Rabata Jadoogarni	PTV	
1994	Tohmat	Tahira	PTV	Shaam Savair
1995	Sadhraan	Sania	PTV	Ajj Di Kahani
1995	Bhulekha	Saamya	PTV	Ajj Di Kahani
1995	Patay Di Gal	Shabbo	PTV	Ajj Di Kahani
2002	Ham Tum Aur Woh	Isha	PTV	Sitcom
2003	Pakhi vaas	Bibi	PTV	
2007	Makaan Te Makeen	Bibi	PTV	Jag Beeti
2011	Naal Meray Koi Challay	Noori	PTV	

== Awards and recognition ==
Year	Award	Category	Result	TV Drama	Ref.
2003	PTV Award	Best Actress	Won	Pakhi Vaas	
