= Khalida Riyasat =

Pakistani actress (1953-1996)

- خالدہ ریاست
- Born: Khalida Riyasat; 7 July 1953; Karachi, Pakistan
- Died: 26 August 1996 (aged 43); Karachi, Pakistan
- Occupation: Actress
- Years active: 1974–1996
- Known for: Acting
- Spouse: Faisal Saleh Hayat (m. 1984–1996)
- Children: 2
- Relatives: Ayesha Khan (sister)

Khalida Riyasat (Urdu: خالدہ ریاست; 7 July 1953 – 26 August 1996) was a veteran Pakistani television actress. Along with Roohi Bano and Uzma Gillani, she dominated Pakistan's television screens from the mid-1970s to the mid-1990s.

== Early life and family ==
Khalida Riyasat was born in 1953 in Karachi. She was the younger sister of notable television personality Ayesha Khan.

== Career ==
Riyasat's earliest drama was the 1975 detective series Naamdaar. Her career took off with Haseena Moin's classic Bandish during the late 1970s. In another popular venture, she acted alongside actor Moin Akhtar in the tongue-in-cheek long play, Half-Plate by Anwar Maqsood. Some of her notable plays are Panah, Bandish, Dhoop Dewar, Khoya Hua Aadmi, Silver Jubilee, Tabeer, Ab Tum Ja Saktey Ho and Parosi.

== Personal life ==
Khalida married Faisal Saleh Hayat in 1984 and had two sons.

== Death ==
Riyasat died of cancer on 26 August 1996 at age 43 and was laid to rest at Sakhi Hassan Graveyard, Karachi

== Filmography ==
=== Television serials ===
| Year | Title | Role | Notes |
|---|---|---|---|
| 1975 | Aik Muhabbat Sou Afsane | Rana | |
| | Dhund | | |
| | Naamdaar | | |
| | Lazawal | | |
| | Nasheman | | |
| | Maqsoom | | |
| | Saaye | | |
| | Ankahi | | |
| | Silver Jublie | | |
| 1975 | Tabeer | Sakeena | |
| 1976 | Zod-e-Pashemaan | Laila | |
| 1976 | Bandish | Tania | |
| 1983 | Adhay Chehray | Aleena Ali Ahmed | |
| 1990 | Parosi | Jahan Ara | |
| | Yes Sir, No Sir | | |

=== Telefilm ===
| Year | Title | Role | Notes |
|---|---|---|---|
| 1979 | Typist | Safia Azeem | |
| 1981 | Panah | Shireen | |
| 1982 | Dhoop Dewar | Roshan | |
| 1982 | Qarz | Dr. Safia | |
| 1982 | Baazdeed | Rubina | |
| 1983 | Nange Paon | Nadira | |
| 1985 | Umeed-e-Bahar | Dr. Jamila | |
| | Dasht-e-Tanhai | | |
| 1983 | Wadi-e-Purkhar | Najma | |
| 1986 | Meri Sadgi Dekh | Sumra | |
| 1989 | Khoya Huwa Aadmi | Bano | |
| 1990 | Half Plate | Begum Mirza | |
| 1996 | Ab Tum Ja Saktey Ho | Aaliya | |
| | Naqsh e Saani | | |

== Tributes and honours ==
In 2005, tributes were paid to her and she was called a legend at the 1st Indus Drama Awards in Karachi by television personalities including Moin Akhter, Adnan Siddiqui, Faysal Qureshi, Sultana Siddiqui, Humayun Saeed and Babra Sharif. The Government of Pakistan named a street and intersection after her in Lahore on August 16, 2021.

== Awards and nominations ==
| Year | Award | Category | Result | Title | Ref. |
|---|---|---|---|---|---|
| 1984 | PTV Award | Best Actress | Nominated | Dhoop Dewar | |
| 1985 | PTV Award | Best Actress | Nominated | Ankahi | |
| 1988 | PTV Award | Best Actress | Nominated | Saaye | |
| 1989 | PTV Award | Best Actress | Won | Wadi-e-Purkhar | |
