= Nisho =

Pakistani actress

- نشو
- Born: Bilquis Khanum; 13 August 1954 (age 71); Gujrat, Punjab, Pakistan
- Education: University of Punjab
- Occupation: Actress
- Years active: 1970 – present
- Spouses: Inam Rabbani (m. 1970; div. 1976) Tasleem Fazli (m. 1978; died 1982) Jamal Pasha (m. 1986; died 2019)
- Children: 3, including Sahiba (daughter)
- Relatives: Afzal Khan (son-in-law)

Bilquis Khanum (born 13 August 1954), also known as Nisho (Urdu; نشو۔), is a Pakistani film actress. She has worked in more than 150 feature films of Lollywood.

== Early life ==
Bilquis Begum was born in Gujrat, Punjab, Pakistan. She completed her studies from University of Punjab.

== Career ==
In the beginning, Nisho was in theatre at school. She made her big screen debut in the film Baazi in 1970. She moved to Karachi, she worked in Lollywood movies. She appeared in films Rangeela, Tiger Gang, Roop Behroop, Bazigar, Yaar Des Punjab Day, Yeh Aman. After the success of her movies she changed her name to Nisho. Later she appeared in films with Waheed Murad and Nadeem Baig. She also sang songs in movies written by her husband Tasleem Fazli, a poet. Nisho also appeared in movies Zalim Tay Mazloom, Namak Harram, Phool Meray Gulshan Ka and Neelaam.

== Personal life ==
Nisho first married her class-fellow Inam Rabbani, but later divorced him. Then she was married to songwriter and poet Tasleem Fazli and they had a daughter named Ayesha Fazli who later married Ali Raza Khan, son of actress Firdous Begum. Nisho's husband died on 17 August 1982. After his death, Nisho married captain Jamal Pasha; the singer Hamza Pasha is their son. She has three children; including actress Sahiba. Nisho's daughter Sahiba is married to actor Afzal Khan. Her grandson Ahsan Afzal Khan is also an actor.

== Filmography ==
=== Television ===
Year	Title	Role	Network
1996	Mahpara	Mahpara	PTV
2012	Ik Doojay Ki Liay	Nisho	PTV
2015	Yeh Chahtein Yeh Ranjishein	Aliya	PTV
2023	Saas Nahi Raas	Madam Wajahat	Mun TV

=== Film ===
Year	Film	Language
1970	Baazi	Urdu
1970	Rangeela	Urdu
1971	Tiger Gang	Urdu
1971	Roop Behroop	Urdu
1971	Bazigar	Punjabi
1971	Yaar Des Punjab Day	Punjabi
1971	Yeh Aman	Urdu
1972	Baazar	Urdu
1972	Angarey	Urdu
1973	Farz	Urdu
1973	Nadan	Urdu
1973	Aar Par	Urdu
1973	Sehray Kay Phool	Urdu
1973	Mulaqat	Urdu
1973	Dulhan Rani	Urdu
1973	Insan Aur Gadha	Urdu
1973	Jaal	Urdu
1973	Kubra Ashiq	Urdu
1973	Ek Thi Larki	Urdu
1973	Tera Gham Rahay Salamat	Urdu
1974	Samaj	Urdu
1974	Mitti Ke Putlay	Urdu
1974	Zalim Tay Mazloom	Punjabi
1974	Parda Na Uthao	Urdu
1974	Namak Harram	Urdu
1974	Phool Meray Gulshan Ka	Urdu
1974	Imandar	Urdu
1974	Neelaam	Urdu
1974	Bahisht	Urdu
1975	Paisa	Urdu
1975	Moashra	Urdu
1975	Shikwa	Urdu
1975	Gumrah	Urdu
1975	Professor	Urdu
1975	Bikhray Moti	Urdu
1975	Neiki Badi	Urdu
1975	Athra	Punjabi
1975	Soorat Aur Seerat	Urdu
1975	Haiwan	Urdu
1975	Roshni	Urdu
1975	Neik Parveen	Urdu
1976	Zubaida	Urdu
1976	Rastay Ka Pathar	Urdu
1976	Aaj Aur Kal	Urdu
1976	Society Girl	Urdu
1976	Badtameez	Punjabi
1976	Jatt Kurian Tun Darda	Punjabi
1976	Dharkan	Urdu
1977	Aamna Samna	Urdu
1977	Gora Kala	Urdu
1977	BeGunah	Punjabi
1977	Aj Diyan Kurrian	Punjabi
1978	Dil Kay Daagh	Urdu
1978	Aadmi	Urdu
1978	Ehtjaj	Urdu
1978	Kall day Munday	Punjabi
1978	Lakha	Punjabi
1979	Mohammad Bin Qasim	Urdu
1980	Hanstay Aansoo	Urdu
1980	Pyari	Urdu
1981	Tangay Wali	Urdu
1982	Saharay	Urdu
1983	Qudrat	Punjabi
1986	Siasat	Urdu
1986	Toofan Aur Zindagi	Urdu
1986	Jawand O Toofan	Pashto
1987	Nazuk Rishtay	Urdu
1987	Meri Awaz	Urdu
1989	Zulm Da Suraj	Punjabi
1992	Mr. 420	Urdu
1994	Khubsoorat Sheitan	Urdu
1994	Anokha Pyar	Urdu
2016	Gunah Ka Anjam	Urdu
2019	Baaji	Urdu
2023	Huey Tum Ajnabi	Urdu

== Awards and recognition ==
Year	Award	Category	Result	Title	Ref.
2023	PTV Icon Awards	National Icon Awards	Won	Contribution to Cinema Industry	
