= Farida Khanum =

Pakistani classical and ghazal singer

HI PP Farida Khanum
- فرِیدہ خانَم
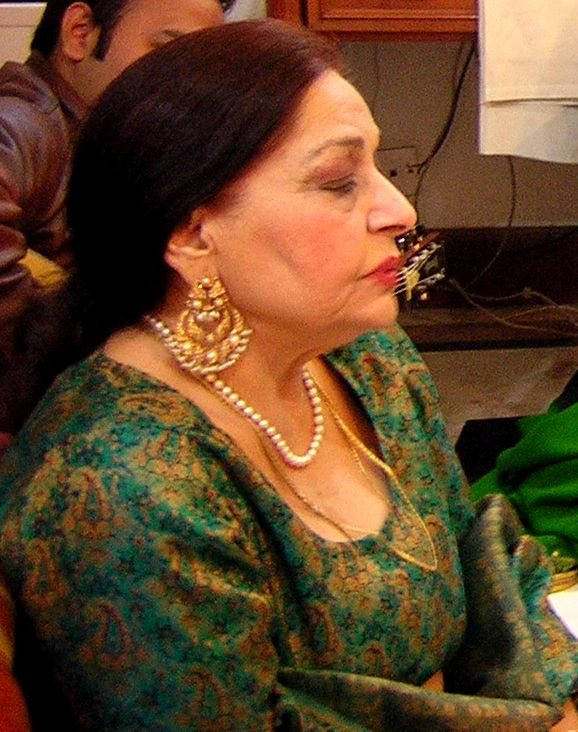
- Farida Khanum rehearsing in December 2005
- Born: Farida Khanum; 16 May 1934 (age 92); Amritsar, British India
- Other name: Queen of Ghazal
- Occupations: Classical singer; Actress; Ghazal singer
- Years active: 1953 - present
- Known for: Ghazal • Dadra • Khyal • Thumri
- Notable credit(s): Coke Studio Pakistan; Pakistan Television Corporation (PTV); Radio Pakistan
- Children: 6
- Relatives: Agha Hashar Kashmiri (brother-in-law); Mukhtar Begum (sister); Sheeba Hassan (niece)
- Awards: Pride of Performance (1970); Hilal-i-Imtiaz (2005)

Farida Khanum (Urdu: فرِیدہ خانَم) is a Pakistani classical singer. She is also known by her honorific title Malika-e-Ghazal (The Queen of Ghazal) in both Pakistan and India and is widely regarded as one of the greatest exponents of the ghazal genre of singing.

== Early life ==
Khanum was born in 1934 in Calcutta, British India, into a Punjabi Muslim family. She had four siblings — a sister and three brothers. Her sister is the famous singer, Mukhtar Begum. Their entire family moved from Amritsar, Punjab, to Lahore, Pakistan, when she was 18 years old.

She started learning Khayal, Thumri, and Dadra from Ustad Ashiq Ali Khan of Patiala gharana. As a child, her sister Mukhtar Begum would take her to the Khan's place for regular riyaaz (practice of classical music). Her family moved to Pakistan after the Partition of India in 1947.

== Career ==
Farida Khanum gave her first public concert in 1950 at the very young age of 15, and then joined Radio Pakistan, where she gained recognition for her singing talent. She became a star when Pakistan's president Ayub Khan invited her to a public recital in the 1960s. Farida also acted in films, and also sang songs for films. She has been a frequent performer on Pakistan Television and other Pakistani TV channels. The ghazal she is most associated with is Aaj Jaane Ki Zidd Naa Karo, written by the famous poet Fayyaz Hashmi. In 2015, at the age of 80, she sang this ghazal in Coke Studio Season 8.

Khanum's live concerts in India have been very popular. She visited Kabul, Afghanistan, in the late 1960s and early 1970s for concerts where she collaborated with Afghan musicians and sang Persian-language ghazals.

== Personal life ==
Farida Khanum lives in Lahore, Pakistan. She has five daughters and one son. Her niece, Sheeba Hassan, is also an actress.

== Filmography ==
=== Television shows ===
Year	Title	Role	Network
1983	Silver Jubilee	Herself	PTV

=== Film ===
Year	Film	Language
1953	Sailab	Urdu
1961	Sher-e-Islam	Urdu
1963	Baaji	Urdu
1967	Main Woh Nahin	Urdu
1968	Pakeeza	Urdu
1969	Qasm Us Waqt Ki	Urdu
1970	Pardesi	Punjabi
1972	Bazi Jit Lei	Punjabi
1973	Pyasa	Urdu
1973	Dukh Sajna Day	Punjabi
1974	Rano	Punjabi
1979	Nishani	Urdu

== Discography ==
- 1978 Farida Khanum in Concert Vol. 1
- 1979 Farida Khanum in Concert Vol. 2
- 1980 Farida Khanum in Concert Vol. 3
- 1985 Taghazzul Farida Khanum Vol. 1
- 1993 Farida Khanum: Meri Pasand Vol 1
- 1993 Farida Khanum: Meri Pasand Vol 2

=== Studio releases ===
Year	Title	Album details	Track listing
1993	Farida Khanum: Meri Pasand Vol 1	Digital release date: 9 April 1993: Label: EMI Pakistan; Genre: World Music; UPC: 829410843775	1. Voh Ishq Jo Humse; 2. Sham-E-Firaq Ab Na; 3. Main Ne Pairon Mein Payal; 4. Raat Jo Tum Ne Deep; 5. Kuchh Ishq Tha Kuchh; 6. Voh Mujh Se Huwe; 7. Yun Saja Chand; 8. Aaj Jane Ki Zid Na Karo; 9. Bairi More Nainan
1993	Farida Khanum: Meri Pasand Vol 2	Digital release date: 9 April 1993: Label: EMI Pakistan; Genre: World Music; UPC: 829410843874	1. Mangwa De Jhumka; 2. Be Chain Bohat Phirna; 3. Suey Maikade Na Jate; 4. Dil Pe Ik Turfa Qayamat; 5. Uzr Aane Main Bhi; 6. Chand Niklee Kisi Janib; 7. Naina Re Naina; 8. Na Rawa Kahiye; 9. Es Tarah Qissa Mera

=== Compilations and live albums ===
Year	Title	Album details	Track listing
1978	Farida Khanum In Concert Vol. 1	Digital release date: 1 December 1978: Label: EMI Pakistan; Genre: World Music; UPC: 829410393676	1. Aaj Jane Ki Zid Na Karo; 2. Mohabbat Karne Wale; 3. Dil Jalane Ki Baat; 4. Uzr Aane Mein Bhi; 5. Mere Hamnafas Mere; 6. Tum Aur Faraib Khao; 7. Sajan Lago Toori; 8. Kuch Ishq Tha
1979	Farida Khanum In Concert Vol. 2	Digital release date: 1 October 1979: Label: EMI Pakistan; Genre: World Music; UPC: 829410503570	1. Chand Nikle Kisi Janib; 2. Wo Kabhi Mil Jayen To; 3. Chand Day Mora; 4. Na Aate Hamen; 5. Ashiq Ke Liye Yaksan; 6. Na Rawa Kahiye; 7. Mit Gaya Zoq-E-Yaqeen; 8. Tere Pyar Mein Ruswa
1980	Farida Khanum In Concert Vol. 3	Digital release date: 1 January 1980: Label: EMI Pakistan; Genre: World Music; UPC: 829410503679	1. Dayar-E-Dil Ki Raat Mein; 2. Yeh Kya Ke Ek Jahan Ko; 3. Ab Na Sahoon Tori; 4. Naina Re Naina; 5. Dil-E-Muztar Ko; 6. Ya Rab Gham-E-Hijran Mein
1985	Taghazzul Farida Khanum Vol 1	Digital release date: 1 July 1985: Label: EMI Pakistan; Genre: World Music; UPC: 884385348106	1. Dil Pe Ik Turfa Qayamat; 2. Asar Us Ko Zara Nahin; 3. Voh Ehad Ehad Hi Kya; 4. So Raha Tha To Shor; 5. Voh Kabhi Mil Jaen To; 6. Garmi-E-Shauq-E-Nazara; 7. Le Ke Voh Teghe Jafa; 8. Dil Mein Hamare; 9. Kis Ko Dhoondne Ghar; 10. Ki Wafa Ham Se To; 11. Lutf Voh Ishq Mein; 12. Chand Meri Tarah

== Tribute ==
In April 2012, a special music concert "Malika-e-Ghazal" was held by Radio Pakistan, Lahore to pay tribute to her. It was attended by several notable personalities and broadcast from various stations.

== Awards and recognition ==
Year	Award	Category	Result	Title	Ref.
1970	Pride of Performance	Award by the President of Pakistan	Won	Herself	
1974	EMI Silver Disc Awards	Best Ghazal Singer	Won	Herself	
1980	Amir Khusrau Award	Best Ghazal Singer	Won	Herself	
2000	PTV Award	Best Singer	Won	Herself	
2005	Hilal-i-Imtiaz (Crescent of Excellence)	Award by the President of Pakistan	Won	Herself	
2005	Hafiz Ali Khan Award	Best Singer	Won	Herself	
2007	The Times of India	Malika-e-Ghazal (Queen of Ghazal)	Won	Herself	
2017	5th Hum Awards	Hum Honorary Lifetime Achievement Award	Won	Herself	
2021	20th Lux Style Awards	Unilever Chairman's Lifetime Achievement Award	Won	Herself	
