= Shakila Qureshi =

Pakistani actress

- شکیلہ قریشی
- Born: 29 October 1962 (age 63); Multan, Punjab, Pakistan
- Other name: Shakeela Qureshi
- Occupations: Actress; Model
- Years active: 1980 – 2010
- Spouse: Umer Shareef (m. 1995; div. 1998)
- Awards: Nigar Award (1989)

Shakila Qureshi, also spelled as Shakeela Qureshi, is a Pakistani former TV and film actress from the 1980s and 1990s. Her notable films include Mr. 420 (1992) and Mr. Charlie (1993). She received the best TV actress Nigar Award in 1989.

== Early life ==
Shakila was interested in acting from a young age. She made her debut in a PTV drama from Lahore.

== Career ==
Shakila worked in PTV dramas during the 1980s. Her notable dramas include Aik Din, Samundar, Pyas, Kikar Kahday and many others such as Sona Chandi, Labbaik. She also showed her face in several TV commercials. In 1983, she opted for films and her debut movie was "Deewangi", directed by Zafar Shabab which was a Golden Jubliee super hit at the box office. The following year in 1989 she received Nigar Award for Best TV Actress for her role as Shamshad in the PTV drama Pyas. Later, she was paired with the comedian actor Umer Shareef in movies Mr. 420 (1992), Mr. Charlie (1993), Miss Fitna (1993), and Baaghi Shehzaday (1995). Then she went back to work in dramas but after sometime, she retired in 2010.

== Personal life ==
Shakila married the comedian Umer Shareef in 1995, but divorced him shortly after.

== Filmography ==
=== Television series ===
Year	Title	Role	Network
1982	Sona Chandi	Pinky	PTV
1982	Chanan Te Dariya	Nayyara	PTV
1983	Samundar	Tabbasum	PTV
1984	Andhera Ujala	Sajida	PTV
1986	Aik Din	Hoora	PTV
1986	Koi To Ho	Saira	PTV
1989	Pyas	Shamshad	PTV
1990	Chakar-e-Azam	Gohar	PTV
1995	Hip Hip Hurray Season 1	Herself	STN
1996	Hip Hip Hurray Season 2	Herself	STN
1996	Labbaik	Zainab	PTV
1997	Family Front	Shakeela	PTV
1999	Kikar Kahday	Azra	PTV
2001	Hawa Pe Raqs	Jahan Ara	PTV

=== Film ===
Year	Film	Language
1983	Deewangi	Urdu
1987	Moti Sher	Punjabi
1988	Dushman	Sindhi
1989	Dushmano Kay Dushman	Urdu
1990	Governor	Punjabi
1990	Paisa Naach Nachaway	Punjabi
1990	Sarmaya	Punjabi
1990	Hushiar	Punjabi
1992	Mr. 420	Urdu
1993	Soudagar	Punjabi / Urdu
1993	Mr. Charlie	Urdu
1994	Actor	Punjabi / Urdu
1994	Hathkari	Punjabi / Urdu
1994	Miss Fitna	Urdu
1995	Baghi Shehzaday	Punjabi / Urdu
1995	Khotay Sikkay	Punjabi / Urdu
1998	Sahib, Bibi Aur Tawaif	Urdu

=== Stage dramas ===
Year	Title	Role	Theater
1989	Buddha Ghar Pe Hai?	Beti	

== Awards and recognition ==
Year	Award	Category	Result	Title	Ref.
1989	Nigar Award	Best TV actress	Won	Pyas	
1995	STN Awards	Best New Talent	Won	Hip Hip Hurray Season 1	
1996	STN Awards	Best Talent	Won	Hip Hip Hurray Season 2	
