= Adeem Hashmi =

Pakistani poet (1946–2001)

- عدیم ہاشمی
- Born: Fashih Uddin; 1 August 1946; Firozpur, British India
- Died: 5 November 2001 (aged 55); Chicago, US
- Occupations: Poet; writer; playwright
- Website: www.adeemhashmi.com

Adeem Hashmi (Note: Urdu: عدیم ہاشمی) (born Fashih Uddin; 1 August 1946 – 5 November 2001) was a Pakistani Urdu poet, writer and playwright.

== Life and career ==
Hashmi's birth name is Fashih Uddin. He wrote the drama serial Aghosh for Pakistan Television. He also wrote a few stories for the comedy-drama series Guest House and songs for radio and TV. He lived most of his life traveling to the United States, and for this heart transplant in 2001, he went to the US on his last trip to visit his friend and prominent poet, Ifti Nasim, who then took care of his burial because of the post-9/11 crisis.

== Literary works ==
Hashmi's works includes Urdu books, poetry and lyrics. Among his most acclaimed works are the collections Tarkash, Mukalima, and Chehra Tumhara Yaad Rahta Hai, as well as the volumes Fasle Aise Bhi Honge and Bahut Nazdik Aate Jaa Rahe Ho. These titles showcase the breadth of his literary contribution across poetry and prose.

== Exile ==
He was exiled for writing against Muhammad Zia-ul-Haq. He was brought back by Benazir Bhutto and then exiled again after writing against her as well.

== Death ==
Hashmi died during heart transplant surgery at the Cook County hospital on 5 November 2001, and was buried in a cemetery for Pakistanis in Chicago, US.
