= Afzal Khan (actor) =

Pakistani actor and comedian

Jan Rambo
- افضل خان
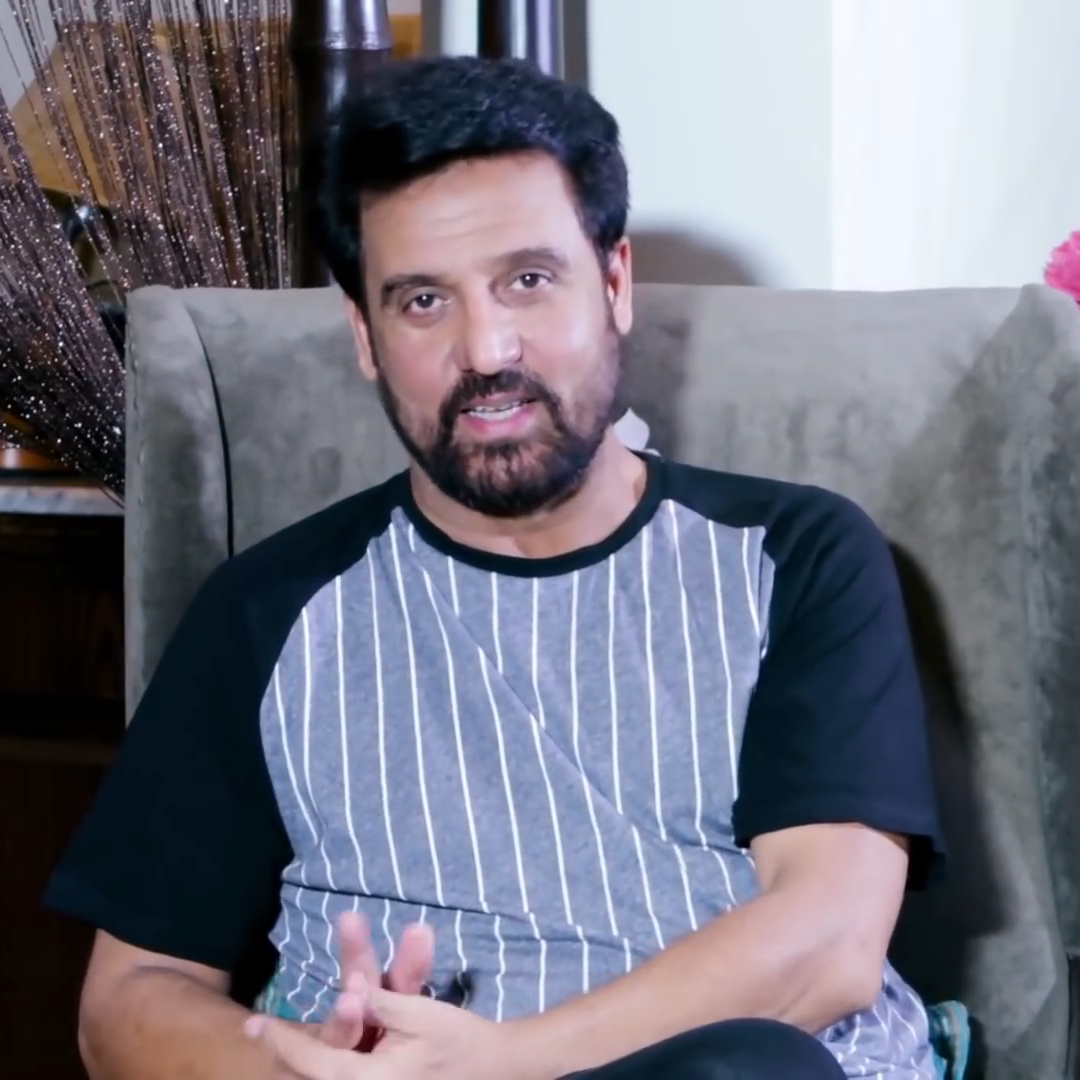
- Khan in 2020
- Born: Afzal Khan; Havelian, Khyber Pakhtunkhwa, Pakistan
- Other name: Jan Rambo
- Occupations: Actor; Comedian; Director; Producer; Host
- Years active: 1991 – Present
- Spouse: Sahiba Afzal
- Children: 2

Afzal Khan (Urdu: افضل خان), better known as Jan Rambo, is a Pakistani film and TV actor, comedian, director, producer and host.

He rose to fame by playing a janitor nicknamed Jan Rambo in PTV's famous comedy show Guest House (1991). He later assumed Jan Rambo as his screen name after the Sylvester Stallone character John Rambo. People on the TV stage had nicknamed him Jan Rambo due to his face, though certainly not his physique, resembling the Hollywood actor's.

== Early life and education ==
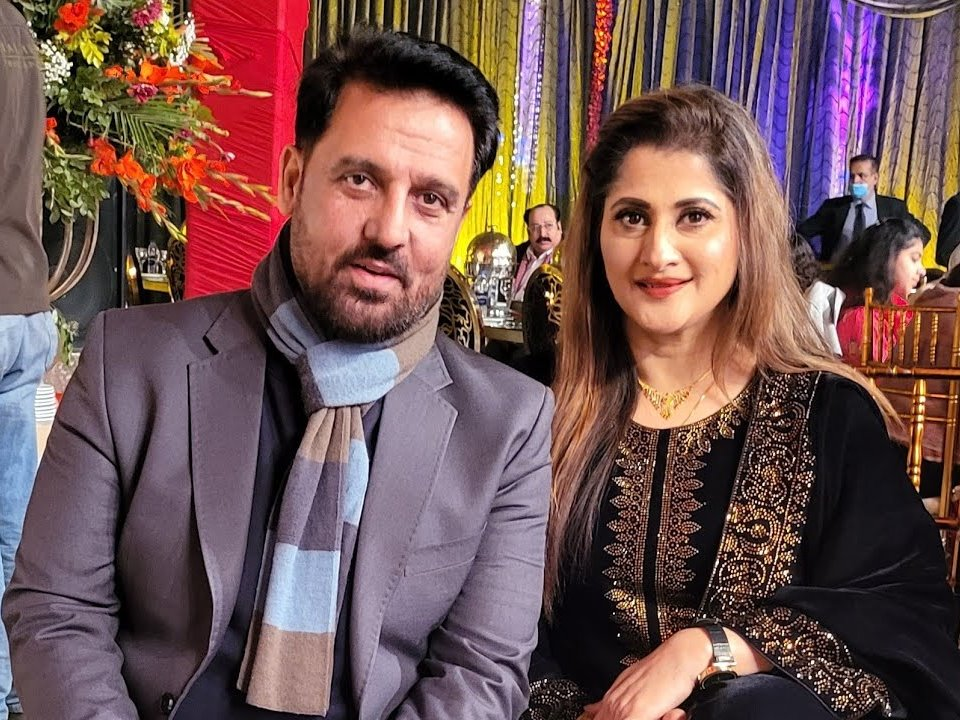
Sahiba and Afzal in 2023

Khan studied at the Asghar Mall College in Rawalpindi, Punjab.

== Career ==
Afzal Khan's comedy style was influenced by film actors Rangeela and Munawwar Zarif. He began his acting career from stage dramas in Islamabad and initially acted in a few plays by PTV that were aired only in Islamabad and Peshawar.

He was cast as Jan Rambo (a janitor) in PTV's comedy series Guest House in 1991. It was an instant hit and Rambo became the most popular character of the series.

After his success as Jan Rambo, he began to get movie offers. In 1992, he signed his first movie and became a mainstream Lollywood actor. He holds the record of signing the highest number of feature films in a single day, that is 26. Khan has appeared in more than 150 movies. However, his image of a comedy actor earned him mostly comedy characters. He tried to do some serious movies but wasn't as successful.

He was particularly noted for his dancing skills, and it has been written that he brought a "revolution" to "synchronized dancing" in Pakistani cinema.

In 2018, he directed the A-Plus TV drama Taqdeer, again starring both Sahiba and Rana.

In 2011, he hosted a morning show on Apna Channel.

== Personal life ==
Khan is married to fellow Lollywood actress Sahiba Afzal, who is the daughter of veteran film actress Nisho. They have two sons. Their elder son, Ahsan Afzal Khan, made his acting debut in the Ramadan play Heer Da Hero.

== Selected filmography ==
=== Television serials ===
Year	Title	Role	Director	Network	Ref
1991	Guest House	Janitor		PTV	
2008–2018	Choki # 420	ASI Raja Shafiq		Aaj Entertainment	
2012	Pak Villa	Sonny		Geo Entertainment	
2012	Larka Karachi Ka Kuri Lahore Di	Sultan Rahi Jr.		Express Entertainment	
2013	Timmy G	Guest		ARY Digital	
2014–2015	Yeh Chahatein Yeh Ranjishein	Murad	Yes	PTV Home	
2016–2017	Khuda Aur Muhabbat (season 2)	Ghafoora Coolie		Geo Entertainment	
2017	Naagin	Golden Khan		Geo Entertainment	
2018	Taqdeer	Taimur Khan	Yes	A-Plus Entertainment	
2021–2022	Thora Sa Pyar	Taimur Khan	Yes	SAB TV	
2023	Heer Da Hero	Inspector Rasheed Jutt		Geo Entertainment	
2023	Thana Tick Tock	SHO Nazakat Butt		EEE Entertainment	
2024	Pagal Khana	Natha		Green Entertainment	
2024	Baby Baji	Qureshi Sahab		ARY Digital	
2025	Aas Paas	Ausaf		Geo Entertainment	
2025	Mafaad Parast	Muneer		Geo Entertainment	
2026	Mitti De Baway	Iqbal Channan's father		Green Entertainment	

=== Webseries ===
Year	Title	Role	Ref
2023	Bashu	Bashu	

=== Films ===
Year	Title	Role	Language	Ref
1992	Hero		Urdu/Punjabi	
1993	Haathi Mere Saathi		Urdu	
1994	International Luteray		Urdu/Punjabi	
1994	Ghunda Raj	Mastana	Punjabi	
1995	Madam Rani		Urdu/Punjabi	
1995	Munda Bigra Jaye	Raja	Urdu	
1995	Love 95		Urdu	
1996	Chor Machaye Shor		Punjabi	
1998	Insaf Ho To Aisa		Urdu	
1998	Zewar		Urdu	
1999	Kursi Aur Qanoon		Urdu	
2001	Jungle Queen		Urdu	
2001	Moosa Khan		Urdu	
2003	Darinda		Urdu	
2011	Love Mein Ghum		Urdu	
2016	Saya e Khuda e Zuljalal	Ghulam Haidar	Urdu	
2016	Jackpot	Cameo appearance	Urdu	
2018	The Donkey King	Jan Mangu	Urdu	
2022	Ghabrana Nahi Hai	Aslam	Urdu	
2023	Money Back Guarantee		Urdu	

== See also ==
- List of Lollywood actors
