= Dil Tanha Tanha =

Pakistani drama television series

- Genre: Drama; Romance
- Written by: Misbah Ali Syed
- Directed by: Ali Masud Saeed
- Music by: SK Salman Khan
- Opening theme: "Dil Tanha Tanha ..." by Ahmed Jahanzeb
- Country of origin: Pakistan
- Original language: Urdu
- No. of episodes: 40

Production
- Executive producer: Momina Duraid
- Producer: Moomal Shunaid
- Running time: Approx. 40 minutes
- Production company: Moomal Productions

Original release
- Network: Hum TV
- Release: 18 November 2020 – 1 April 2021

Dil Tanha Tanha (Urdu: دل تنہا تنہا, lit. 'The Lonely Heart') is a Pakistani drama television series produced by Moomal Shunaid under her banner Moomal Productions and aired on Hum TV from 18 November 2020 to 1 April 2021. It stars Kiran Haq, Nazish Jahangir, Mohsin Abbas Haider, and Ali Ansari in leading roles.

== Premise ==
The series revolves around the constant suffering and despair of women in our society due to inequality and unfair treatment. It shows that how man has taught to win in any case.

== Cast ==
- Mohsin Abbas Haider as Adeel
- Kiran Haq as Tooba
- Ali Ansari as Asfand
- Nazish Jahangir as Mirha
- Arez Ahmed as Sohail
- Fareeha Jabeen as Adeel's mother
- Farah Nadeem as Ammi
- Aurangzeb Leghari as Mirha's father
- Nabeela Khan as Tarbiyah
- Zubair Akram
- Kanwal Khan as Nimra
- Michalle Mumtaz as Maria
- Mehak Ali as Zeeshan's mother
- Shahzad Malik
