= Ab Tum Ja Saktey Ho =

- Title screen
- Original title: اب تم جا سکتے ہو
- Screenplay by: Mansoor Mani
- Story by: Khadija Mastoor
- Directed by: Mehreen Jabbar
- Starring: Khalida Riyasat; Sania Saeed; Humayun Saeed
- Theme music composer: Farrukh Abid
- Country of origin: Pakistan
- Original language: Urdu

Production
- Producer: Mehreen Jabbar
- Cinematography: Nameer Malik
- Editor: Pervaiz Piyar Ali
- Production company: Tasveer Productions

Original release
- Network: Pakistan Television Corporation
- Release: 1996

Ab Tum Ja Saktey Ho (lit. "You can go now!") is a Pakistani telefilm directed by Mehreen Jabbar and aired on Pakistan Television. It is based on a short story by Khadija Mastoor. It starred Khalida Riyasat, Sania Saeed and Humayun Saeed. The telefilm was released in 1996 and first broadcast on Pakistan Television Corporation.

The telefilm is among the earliest directorial works of Jabbar.

== Plot ==
Aliya is an unmarried school teacher who lives with her niece Raheela. Aliya is used to interfering in every aspect of Raheela's life, which makes the young girl feel trapped. But Raheela does not dare to raise her voice against her aunt. Things change completely for both women when a relative, Shaukat, comes to live with them.

== Cast ==
- Khalida Riyasat as Aliya
- Sania Saeed as Raheela
- Humayun Saeed as Shuakat

== Reception ==
One review praised the telefilm for its theme of obsession with marriage, and called it "another feel-good telefilm by Jabbar".
