= The Shareef Show Mubarak Ho =

Pakistani television show

- Title screen
- Also known as: The Shareef Show
- Genre: Talk Show
- Directed by: Muhammad Nadeem
- Presented by: Umer Shareef
- Country of origin: Pakistan
- Original language: Urdu

Original release
- Network: Geo Entertainment
- Release: 26 October 2009

The Shareef Show Mubarak Ho (previously The Shareef Show) was a late night Pakistani talk show hosted by Umer Shareef, airing on Geo TV. The first episode aired on 26 October 2009, featuring the politician Ghulam Mustafa Khar as a guest.

The Shareef Show invites celebrity guests from the world of film, television, music, fashion, sport and politics.
