= Mukhtar Begum =

Pakistani singer

- Born: Mukhtar Khanum; 12 July 1901; Amritsar, Punjab, British India, (present-day India)
- Died: 25 February 1982 (aged 80); Karachi, Sindh, Pakistan
- Other names: The Queen of Music; Queen Songstress; Melody Queen of India; Queen of Indian Talkie Music; Queen of Parsi Theatre
- Education: Patiala Gharana Music School
- Occupations: Singer; Actress; Dancer; Composer
- Years active: 1920 – 1982
- Spouse: Agha Hashar Kashmiri
- Children: 1
- Parent: Ghulam Muhammad (father)
- Relatives: Farida Khanum (sister); Sheeba Hassan (niece)

Mukhtar Begum (born Mukhtar Khanum) was a Pakistani classical singer, composer, ghazal singer, dancer and actress. She was known as The Queen of Music, Queen of Indian Talkie Music, Queen Songstress, The Queen of Parsi Theatre, and Melody Queen of India for singing songs in films, theatre, and on radio. She worked in Hindi, Punjabi, and Urdu films and was known for her roles in the films Hathili Dulhan, Ali Baba 40 Chor, Nala Damayanti, Dil Ki Pyas, Ankh Ka Nasha, Muflis Ashiq, and Chatra Bakavali.

== Early life ==
Mukhtar Begum was born Mukhtar Khanum in 1901 in Amritsar, British India. Mukhtar was the eldest sibling of three brothers and a sister, Farida Khanum.

Mukhtar's father, Ghulam Muhammad, was a great music lover, and he used to play harmonium. When he realized that his elder daughter, Mukhtar Begum, had a natural talent for music, he sent her to receive early training in classical singing under Ustad Shambhu Maharaj, Ustad Allah Daya Khan Meherban, and Ustad Lachhu Maharaj. They trained her in thumri, dadra, and ghazal singing.

She attended Patiala Gharana's classic music school. A teacher named Ustad Mian Meherbaan Khan there liked her singing, and he was the teacher of Ustad Aashiq Ali Khan. So he trained Mukhtar Begum in Hindustani vocal classical music from the age of seven.

In 1920, she was regularly invited by Rajas and Maharajas to their royal courts, and was given huge respect. She was hired by Nizam of Hyderabad at his court and would sing classical songs. Then he offered her to sit next to his Queen, which was criticised by his court officials. Later he mentioned that the reason he had offered her to sit next to the Queen's chair was because of her art and talent.

== Career ==
In the 1930s, she moved to Kolkata, and she did stage plays and theatre, which were written by famous Urdu playwright and poet Agha Hashar Kashmiri. Mukhtar Begum also went to Bombay, and there she also worked in theatre. She worked mostly in parsi theatre plays and dramas; later, she was called The Queen of Parsi Theatre.

After doing theatre, she started working in silent films and made her debut in 1931, and she appeared in both Hindi, Punjabi, and Urdu films, including Nala Damayanti, Dil Ki Pyas, Ankh Ka Nasha, and Muflis Ashiq. Mukhtar Begum also composed songs for two films in which she worked, including Prem Ki Aag and Bhesham.

In Calcutta, she met Noor Jehan and her family, and she encouraged Noor Jehan and her sisters to join films and theater. So she introduced them to some producers and to her husband, Agha Hashar Kashmiri.

After her husband's death in 1935 then she founded her own film company, Mukhtar Films.

Mukhtar Begum, along with her family, moved to Pakistan after partition and she settled in Lahore. She continued to sing ghazals for radio and television. At Lahore, Mukhtar Begum then went to Radio Pakistan. From there, she sang many songs.

Mukhatr Begum also worked as a music teacher, and she trained singer Naseem Begum and her own younger sister Farida Khanum in classical music singing and ghazals.

In 1962, she was invited by President Ayub Khan when he established Agha Hashar Academy on September 20 in Lahore, which he named after her husband Agha Hashar Kashmiri in his honour and for his contribution to the arts field, and she worked there as a teacher both in the singing and acting departments.

Then she started acting in films and appeared in the film Aina, which was written by Bashir Niaz and directed by Nazar-ul-Islam. The film was a Diamond Jubilee at the box office.

== Personal life ==
Mukhtar married Urdu poet, playwright, and dramatist Agha Hashar Kashmiri; later, she had one child with him, and Mukhtar's younger sister Farida Khanum is also a famous ghazal singer, and her niece Sheeba Hassan is also an actress.

== Illness and death ==
Mukhtar Begum suffered a paralysis and contracted a prolonged illness from which she died on 25 February 1982 at age 80 in Karachi, and she was laid to rest at Society's Graveyard in Karachi.

== Filmography ==
=== Film ===
Year	Film	Language
1932	Ali Baba 40 Chor	Hindi, Urdu
1932	Chatra Bakawali	Hindi, Urdu
1932	Hathili Dulhan	Hindi, Urdu
1932	Hindustan	Hindi, Urdu
1932	Indrasabha	Hindi, Urdu
1932	Krishna Kant Ki Wasiyat	Hindi, Urdu
1932	Muflis Ashiq	Hindi, Urdu
1932	Shravan Kumar	Hindi, Urdu
1933	Ankh Ka Nasha	Urdu, Hindi
1933	Aurat Ka Pyar	Hindi, Urdu
1933	Chantamini	Hindi, Urdu
1933	Nala Damayanti	Urdu, Hindi
1933	Ramayan	Hindi, Urdu
1934	Seeta	Urdu, Hindi
1935	Dil Ki Pyas	Hindi, Urdu
1935	Majnu 1935	Hindi, Urdu
1936	Prem Ki Aag	Hindi, Urdu
1937	Bhesham	Hindi, Urdu
1940	Matwali Mira	Punjabi
1941	Chatra Bakvali	Punjabi
1977	Aina	Urdu

=== Composer ===
Year	Film	Role	Notes
1936	Prem Ki Aag	Composer	She acted in the film
1937	Bhesham	Composer	Under her production Mukhtar Films
