= Dhoop Dewar =

Pakistani television series

- Title screen
- دھوپ دیوار
- Genre: Drama
- Written by: Younus Javed
- Directed by: Mohammad Nisar Hussain
- Starring: Madeeha Gauhar; Khalida Riyasat; Firdous Jamal; Salman Shahid
- Country of origin: Pakistan
- Original language: Urdu

Production
- Producer: Mohammad Nisar Hussain

Original release
- Network: PTV
- Release: 1982

Dhoop Dewar (Urdu: دھوپ دیوار, lit. 'Sunny Wall') is a 1982 Pakistani television play written by Younus Javed and produced and directed by Mohammad Nisar Hussain. It aired on PTV.

== Plot ==
Dhoop Dewar centres on Nargis, Roshan, Salman, and Asad. Roshan comes from a wealthy family and wishes to marry Salman, who is from a middle-class background, but her father withholds his consent. Salman subsequently marries Nargis, a college lecturer from an educated family. His conduct creates difficulties in the marriage, and the couple eventually separate, leaving their son Asad to bear the consequences.

== Cast ==
- Madeeha Gauhar as Nargis
- Khalida Riyasat as Roshan
- Firdous Jamal as Salman
- Salman Shahid as Ezad
- Sajjad Kishwar as Amjad Hussain
- Khursheed Shahid as Salma
- Inam Khan as Asad
- Hamid Mehmood as Zeerak
- Nazar Abbas as Clerk
- Pervaiz Raza as Clerk
- Mian Azam as Fazal Baba
- Shahid Ahmed as Ahmed
- Huma Dar as Azra
- Samina Khalid as Noreen
- Sadaf Khan as Husna
- Riaz Shoki as Chaprasi
- Abid Butt as Sardar Ahmed
- Javed Akhtar as Talib Ilm
- Abdul Ghafoor as Asad

== Accolades ==
Year	Award	Category	Recipient	Result	Ref.
1984	PTV Awards	Best Actress	Khalida Riyasat	Nominated	
