= International Guerillas =

International Gorillay
- Directed by: Jan Mohammad
- Written by: Nasir Adeeb (screenplay) Zahoor Ahmed (dialogue)
- Produced by: Sajjad Gul
- Starring: Mustafa Qureshi; Babra Sharif; Javed Sheikh
- Music by: M Ashraf
- Distributed by: Eveready Pictures
- Release date: 27 April 1990
- Running time: 167 minutes
- Country: Pakistan
- Languages: Urdu; Punjabi; English

International Guerrillas (original title: International Gorillay) is a 1990 spy action film from Pakistan, originally released in the context of the Satanic Verses controversy. The movie portrays Salman Rushdie as its main villain. The film was made primarily in the Urdu and Punjabi languages with some bits of English. it also features several musical numbers including songs and dances.

The film was produced by Sajjad Gul, who described it as a purely commercial project rather than an artistic one.

== Plot ==
The film's protagonists are three Pakistani brothers, the eldest one being a police officer and the younger two, small-time hoodlums. The three brothers ultimately reconcile in the light of the controversy over The Satanic Verses: in a dramatized version of the Islamabad police firing on a mob on 12 February 1990 when five demonstrators were killed and 83 injured, their younger sister is killed by the police while demonstrating against Rushdie. The three brothers decide to avenge her and Islam's honor by hunting down and killing Rushdie. They receive the help of a female police officer in the course of their mission.

Salman Rushdie, played by Afzaal Ahmad, is portrayed in the film as a sadistic criminal mastermind, working for an international conspiracy devoted to destroying Islam (as the Muslim faith is an obstacle to his wishes of building casinos, nightclubs and brothels around the world). He is depicted as hiding in the Philippines, guarded by a private army led by an Israeli general. Saeed Khan Rangeela stars as "Chief Batu Batu", Rushdie's main Jewish henchman. Rushdie lives a life of hedonism and other excesses and routinely amuses himself by torturing and killing the mujaheddins who regularly try to hunt him down. He also enjoys torturing Muslims by making them listen to readings of The Satanic Verses.

The protagonists arrive in the Philippines and start their hunt for Rushdie, who escapes them repeatedly thanks to the use of multiple decoys. In the course of one of their attempts to kill Rushdie, the three brothers appear wearing Batman costumes. The Israeli general's sister is sent to seduce one of the Muslim guerrillas but ends up falling in love with him and ultimately converting to Islam in the final scene.

The film ends with a gunfight opposing the four "International Guerrillas" and Rushdie's army of Israeli henchmen. The heroes defeat the villains and, as Rushdie attempts to flee the scene, four giant Qur'ans appear in the sky and fire lightning bolts at the writer, incinerating him.

== Cast ==
- Ghulam Mohiuddin
- Mustafa Qureshi
- Saeed Khan Rangeela
- Babra Sharif
- Hamayun Qureshi
- Naghma
- Afzaal Ahmad as Salman Rushdie.

== Temporary ban in the UK and response by Rushdie ==
The film was denied a certificate by the British Board of Film Classification, effectively denying it a cinema release in the UK. The board cited the safety of Salman Rushdie as an argument for refusing the certificate, arguing that it could inflame some to violence.

Although the film portrayed Salman Rushdie very negatively, he opposed the ruling of the BBFC, arguing that:

As a writer, I am opposed in principle to the use of the archaic criminal laws of blasphemy, sedition and criminal libel against creative works, even in the case of a film which quite plainly vilifies me.

The ban was overturned, and the film was classified at 18. Rushdie later said, "If that film had been banned, it would have become the hottest video in town: everyone would have seen it". While the film was a great hit in Pakistan, it enjoyed only a limited release in the West, where it went virtually unnoticed.
