= Chor Machaye Shor (1996 film) =

1996 film

- Directed by: Syed Noor
- Written by: Syed Noor
- Produced by: Ahad Malik
- Starring: Reema Khan; Babar Ali; Saud; Jan Rambo
- Cinematography: Shoaib Mansoor
- Music by: M. Arshad
- Release date: 22 March 1996
- Country: Pakistan
- Language: Urdu

Chor Machaye Shor (Transl: When the guilty protest) is a 1996 Pakistani Urdu-language film directed by Syed Noor. The film starred Babar Ali, Resham, and Sahiba Afzal. It was released on 22 March 1996.

It is a re-make of the 1980 Punjabi film Sohra te Jawai (Transl: Father-in-law and son-in-law).

== Cast ==
- Reema Khan
- Babar Ali
- Jan Rambo
- Saud
- Sahiba Afzal
- Resham
- Ali Ejaz

== Songs ==
Film song lyrics were written by Riaz ur Rehman Saghar and Saeed Gillani, and M. Arshad composed the music.

- Ghari Raat Ka Eik Bajaye Aur Janu Ghar Na Aye, sung by Shazia Manzoor, Saira Naseem
- Banno Hamari Anmol, Sajao Doli Dholak Baja Ke, sung by Shazia Manzoor, Saira Naseem and others.

== Awards ==
- Nigar Award for Best Female Playback Singer for this film in 1996.
