= Sajjad Kishwar =

Pakistani actor (1933–2022)

- سجاد کِشور
- Born: 6 July 1933; Ludhiana, Punjab, British India
- Died: 24 May 2022 (aged 88); Rawalpindi, Punjab, Pakistan
- Occupations: TV, film and radio actor
- Years active: 1967 - 2018
- Awards: Tamgha-e-Imtiaz (Medal of Excellence) Award by the Government of Pakistan

Sajjad Kishwar (Punjabi, Urdu: سجاد کِشور; 6 July 1933 – 24 May 2022) was a Pakistani film, radio and television actor.

== Career ==
Sajjad Kishwar was born in the early 1930s in Ludhiana, Punjab, British India. He began his career in Pakistan Television Rawalpindi in 1967, as an actor in the drama Raizgari.

During his nearly 45-year career, he performed in around 100 films and 1,000 television dramas.

== Awards ==
- 2006 Lifetime Achievement Award, Radio Pakistan
- 2010 Lifetime Achievement Award, National Development Council of Pakistan
- Tamgha-e-Imtiaz (Medal of Excellence) Award by the Government of Pakistan.

== Filmography ==
He appeared in more than 100 films and nearly 1000 television series:

=== Films ===
- 1982 - Aangan
- 2007 - Khuda Kay Liye

=== Television series ===
Year	Title	Role	Notes
1967	Raizgari		
—	Akhri Shab		
1975	Dada Aur Dildada	Mubarak	Aik Muhabbat Sau Afsanay
1979–1980	Waris	Sher Muhammad	
1981	Kaanch Ka Pul	Doctor Lateef	Long-play
1981	Chataan Par Ghonsla	Shaukat	Long-play
1982	Dhoop Dewar	Amjad Hussain	Long-play
1982	Sona Chandi	Tafazzul	
1983	Alif Noon		
1991	Sangchoor	Inspector Azhar	
1992	Visaal	Bakhshi Siddiq	
1992	Pani Pe Likha Tha	Zahoor	Long-play
1994	Shareeka	Chowkidar	Shaam Savair
1995	Zeest		
2000	Qafs		
2001	Armaan		
2003	Izteraab	Head Master	
2011	Tinkay		
2011	Jeena To Hai		
2011	Dard Kay Rishtay	Salman	
2018	Dhanak	Siddiqui	

== See also ==
- List of Lollywood actors
