= Kaanch Ka Pul =

1981 Pakistani television long play

- کانچ کا پل
- Genre: Drama; Tragedy
- Written by: Younus Javed
- Directed by: Mohammad Nisar Hussain
- Starring: Roohi Bano; Sarwat Ateeq; Khursheed Shahid; Tauqeer Nasir; Firdous Jamal
- Country of origin: Pakistan
- Original language: Urdu

Production
- Producer: Mohammad Nisar Hussain

Original release
- Network: PTV
- Release: 1981

Kaanch Ka Pul (Urdu: کانچ کا پل, lit. 'The Glass Bridge') is a 1981 Pakistani television long play written by Younus Javed and produced and directed by Mohammad Nisar Hussain for PTV.

== Plot ==
The central character is Shahida, a doctor who operates a clinic serving underprivileged patients. She lives with her mother, Begum Nisar, who is sympathetic to her circumstances. Begum Nisar wishes to arrange Shahida's marriage to a prosperous man, but Shahida declines, having been affected by the breakdown of her parents' marriage and her own earlier broken engagement. She chose to live with her mother following her parents' divorce. Margaret, a nurse and close friend, provides Shahida with emotional support. Shahida's estranged father later visits to inform her that he is relocating to California, a meeting that unsettles Begum Nisar. Shortly afterwards, Shahida's cousin Yousaf returns from abroad and seeks to marry her; she refuses, as he had previously abandoned their planned marriage. Shahida subsequently takes on the care of a mute and physically disabled child named Gullu, following the death of his parents. Over time, Gullu regains the ability to speak and walk. When he is older, Gullu confesses his love for Shahida.

== Cast ==
- Roohi Bano as Shahida
- Sarwat Ateeq as Margaret
- Khursheed Shahid as Begum Nisar
- Tauqeer Nasir as Gullu
- Firdous Jamal as Yousaf
- Sajjad Kishwar as Doctor Latif
- Khalid Usman as Nisar
- Tahira Saleem as Surayya
- Sara Haq as Razia
- Nasir Naqvi as Zahid
- Qudsia Bano as Daraan
- Chandni as Salma
- Riaz Shoki as Anwar Zaman
- Farooq Azhar as Jameel
- Azam Jahangir as Amjad
- Mumtaz Ali as Hameed
- M. Alam as Dehati
- Saleem Pasha as Altaf
- Saeed Iqbal as Ahmed
- Roshan Aara as Mam
- Afshan as Najma
- Najma Hasan as Ferozaan
- Naz Basheeruddin as Noraan
- Sanami as Ajmal
