= Umer Shareef =

Pakistani film director, actor, comedian (1955-2021)

Umer Sharif TI
- عمر شریف
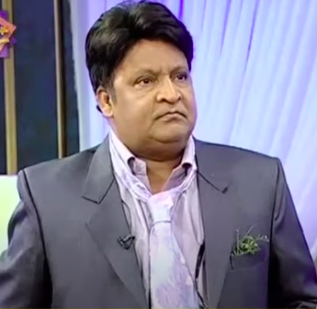
- Umer Shareef in 2017
- Born: Mohammad Umer; 19 April 1955; Karachi, Sindh, Pakistan
- Died: 2 October 2021 (aged 66); Nuremberg, Germany
- Resting place: Abdullah Shah Ghazi Mazar, Clifton, Karachi
- Occupations: Actor; Host; Comedian; Director; Producer; Writer; Singer; Television personality
- Years active: 1969–2021
- Title: King of Comedy
- Spouses: Deeba Omer; Shakila Qureshi (m. 1995; div. 1998); Zareen Ghazal (m. 2005–2021)
- Awards: Tamgha-e-Imtiaz

Comedy career
- Medium: Stand-up; film; television
- Genres: Observational comedy; Character comedy; Improvisational comedy; Satire
- Subjects: Everyday life; Popular culture; Pakistani culture; Celebrities

Mohammad Umer (19 April 1955 – 2 October 2021), known professionally as Umer Shareef, was a Pakistani actor, host, comedian, director, producer, writer, singer and television personality.

Umer began his career at the age of 14 with stand-up comedy and later worked in around 60 stage comedies as well as numerous television shows and films, where he not only acted but also directed and produced.

== Early life ==
Mohammad Umer was born on 19 April 1955, into a middle-class Muhajir family in Liaquatabad, Karachi. The youngest of his siblings, he lost his father when he was 4.

== Career ==
=== Stage ===
In 1969, Umer started his career from Karachi as a stage performer at the age of 14. He joined theatre, using the stage name Umer Zarif, modelled after his favourite comedian Munawar Zarif, but later renamed himself to Umer Sharif following Egyptian actor Omar Sharif that he admired due to the 1962 movie Lawrence of Arabia.

In 1976, he wrote the stage play Bionic Servant, inspired by the American TV series Six Million Dollar Man, where Moin Akhter was an actor, marking their first collaboration.

Some of his extremely popular comedy stage plays were 1989's Bakra Qistoon Pe and Buddha Ghar Pe Hai.

Sharif became a very popular star during this period. Much of the success came from the fact that he started to record his stage shows and his videotapes were rented out in a manner similar to movies. Yes Sir Eid and No Sir Eid were among the first stage plays to come out on video.

==== Controversy ====
For the 50-year anniversary of Pakistan's independence, Sharif performed a play called Umer Sharif Haazir Ho. In the play, representatives from many occupations were summoned in court to explain what they had done for Pakistan over the past 50 years. Upset by the portrayal a lawyer, an organization of lawyers lodged a case against Sharif as a result.

=== Television ===
In 2002, Sharif wrote his first TV serial, Parda Na Uthao.

In October 2009, he started hosting his own late-night talk show, The Shareef Show, on Geo Entertainment. He interviewed many actors, entertainers, musicians, and politicians on the show. Another of his shows was Umer Sharif vs Umer Sharif, where he donned over 400 get-ups. He also appeared as a guest judge on the Indian stand-up comedy show The Great Indian Laughter Challenge, alongside Navjot Singh Siddhu, and Shekhar Suman.

=== Films ===
Sharif's first movie was Hisaab (1986) but he's better known for Mr 420 (1992), a movie where he not only acted but also directed, wrote and sung in, that led to a revival of Pakistan's cinema till 1998.

He would work in some 35 films, his last movie being Chand Babu (1999), that he directed, produced and acted in.

=== Politics ===
In 2007, Sharif announced he had joined MQM, saying he had done so because the party was open-minded and ‘best for Karachi’. In 2011, backed by the MQM, he ran for the presidency of the Karachi Arts Council. But the PPP-backed candidate, Ahmed Shah, defeated him.

=== Philanthropy ===
In 2006, the Umer Sharif Welfare Trust was formed with the stated goal of creating a "state of the art health centre that provides services free of cost."

== Awards and recognition ==
Sharif received National awards for Best Director and Best Actor in 1992 for Mr. 420. He received ten Nigar Awards. Sharif was the only actor to receive four Nigar Awards in a single year. He received three Graduate Awards. Sharif was also a recipient of Tamgha-e-Imtiaz.

== Illness and death ==
On 10 September 2021, Pakistani television host and news anchor Waseem Badami posted a video of Shareef on Instagram where he requested the then Prime Minister of Pakistan, Imran Khan to facilitate cancer treatment for him overseas. Soon after the video came out, Indian singer Daler Mehndi also appealed to Prime Minister Imran Khan for immediate treatment for Sharif. On 11 September 2021, the government formed a medical board to decide whether or not to send him abroad for treatment. He was granted a United States visa for medical treatment on 16 September 2021 and the Sindh government also approved 40 million rupees for his treatment. Despite all these projects, on 2 October 2021, he died in a hospital in Nuremberg, Germany, at the age of 66.

== Influence and legacy ==
Referred to as the "King of Comedy", Sharif is considered to be one of the greatest comedians of South Asia. Popular Indian comedians like Johnny Lever hailed him as "The God of Asian comedy".

Leading Pakistani in show business and political leaders offered their condolences including Mehwish Hayat, Hareem Farooq and Imran Khan.

== Selected filmography ==
=== Stage dramas ===
- Bakra Qiston Pay Part 1, 2, 3, 4, 5 (1989)
- Dulhan Main Lekar Jaonga
- Salam Karachi (2005)
- Andaz Apna Apna
- Meri Bhi To Eid Karade
- Nayee Aami Purana Abba (2004)
- Yeh Hay Naya Tamasha (1993)
- Yeh Hay Naya Zamana (2003)
- Yes Sir Eid No Sir Eid (1989)
- Eid Tere Naam
- No Parking (1985)
- Samad Bond 007
- Nach Meri Bulbul
- Lahore se London
- Angoor Khatay Hain
- Petrol Pump
- Lotay te Lafafey
- Loot Sale (2004)
- Half Plate
- Meri Jaan Thanedaar
- Umar Sharif in Jungle
- Beauty Parlour (1998)
- Makeup Room
- Chaudhary Plaza (2004)
- Mamu Mazak Mat Karo (1993)
- Hum Se Milo
- Yeh To House Full Hogaya
- Bakra Munna Bhai (2004)
- Behrupia
- Lal Qile ki Rai Lalu Khet ka Raja
- Chand Baraye Farokhat (2003)
- Hanste Raho Chalte Raho (2003)
- Umar Sharif Hazir Ho (1997)
- Baby Samjha Karo
- Doctor aur Kasai
- Budha Ghar Pe Hai
- Eid Aashiqon Ki
- Nehle pe Dehla
- One Day Eid Match (1992)
- Police Ho To Aisi
- Paying Guest (2003)
- Aao Sach Bolain
- Flight 420
- Coolie 420
- Hamsa Ho To Samn Aaye (1994)
- Walima Taiyar Hai
- Filmi Pariyan
- Akbar e Azam in Pakistan
- Jeet Teri Peda Mera
- Shadi Magar Aadhi
- Bebia
- Mano Meri Baat
- Gol Maal
- Female Ki Email
- Eidy Chupa ke Rakhna
- Dulha (2002)
- Corner Wali Haveli
- Valima tayar hai
- Laal kilay ki rani, laloo khet ka raja
- Tera baqra mera qasai
- Nayee ammi purane abbu
- Kia cheez hai Pakistani

=== Films ===
Year	Title	Actor	Director	Producer	Writer	Singer	Language	Notes
1986	Hisab	Yes	No	No	No	No	Urdu	
1987	Kundan	Yes	No	No	No	No	Urdu	
1992	Mr. 420	Yes	Yes	No	Yes	Yes	Urdu	
1993	Mr. Charlie	Yes	Yes	No	Yes	Yes	Urdu	
1994	Khandan	Yes	No	No	No	No	Urdu/Punjabi	
1994	Laat Sahb	Yes	No	No	No	Yes	Urdu/Punjabi	
1994	Ghunda Raj	Yes	No	No	No	No	Punjabi	
1994	Zameen Aasman	Yes	No	No	No	No	Urdu/Punjabi	
1994	But Shikkan	Yes	No	No	No	No	Urdu/Punjabi	
1995	Mastana Mahi	Yes	No	No	No	No	Punjabi	
1999	Chand Babu	Yes	Yes	Yes	Yes	Yes	Urdu	

=== Television shows ===
Year	Show	Role	Channel	Notes
2009	The Shareef Show	Host	Geo Entertainment	
2005–2008	The Great Indian Laughter Challenge	Guest	STAR One	
2005	Omer Sharif vs Omer Sharif	Host/Actor	Geo Entertainment	
