= Mr. Charlie =

1993 Pakistani Urdu film

- Original title: مسٹر. چارلی
- Directed by: Umer Sharif
- Produced by: Parvez Kaifee
- Starring: Shakila Qureshi; Umer Shareef; Deeba; Afzaal Ahmad
- Music by: Kemal Ahmed
- Release date: 25 March 1993
- Country: Pakistan
- Language: Urdu

Mr. Charlie is a 1993 Pakistani Urdu romantic comedy film directed by Umer Shareef. The lead cast included Shakila Qureshi, Umer Shareef, Deeba and Afzaal Ahmad.

== Cast ==
- Shakila Qureshi
- Umer Shareef
- Sherien
- Shafqat
- Deeba
- Afzaal Ahmad

== Release and box office ==
Mr. Charlie was released on 25 March 1993.

== Music and soundtracks ==
The playback music was composed by Kemal Ahmed and lyrics were penned by Umer Shareef:

- Ladka Badnaam Hua Haseena Teray liye — Singer: Umer Sharif

== Awards ==
Year	Film	Award	Category	Awardee	Ref.
1992	Mr. Charlie	Nigar Award	Best actor	Umer Shareef	
