= Mr. 420 (1992 film) =

1992 Pakistani Urdu film

- Original title: مسٹر. 420
- Directed by: Umer Shareef
- Written by: Umer Sharif
- Produced by: Parvez Kaifee
- Starring: Umer Shareef; Shakila Qureshi; Rubi Niazi; Madiha Shah; Abid Ali; Nisho; Nirala
- Music by: Kemal Ahmed
- Production company: Meeran Lajpal Films
- Release date: 12 May 1992
- Country: Pakistan
- Language: Urdu

Mr. 420 is a 1992 Pakistani Urdu film directed by Umer Shareef. The film starred Shareef, Madiha Shah, Shakila Qureshi, Rubi Niazi, Nisho, and Abid Ali. Mr. 420 won 6 Nigar Awards, including the best film award for the year.

== Cast ==
- Umer Shareef
- Madiha Shah
- Shakila Qureshi
- Rubi Niazi
- Nisho
- Abid Ali
- Tariq Shah
- Nirala
- Chakram
- Majeed Zarif

== Release and box office ==
Mr. 420 was released on 12 June 1992. It was crowned as a golden jubilee hit film.

== Awards ==
Year	Film	Award	Category	Awardee	Ref.
1992	Mr. 420	Nigar Award	Best film		
1992	Mr. 420	Nigar Award	Best actress	Rubi Niazi	
1992	Mr. 420	Nigar Award	Best actor	Umer Shareef	
1992	Mr. 420	Nigar Award	Best director	Umer Shareef	
1992	Mr. 420	Nigar Award	Best Script writer	Umer Shareef	
1992	Mr. 420	Nigar Award	Best Screenplay	Umer Shareef	
