= Sahiba (actress) =

Pakistani actress

Sahiba Afzal
- صاحبہ افضل
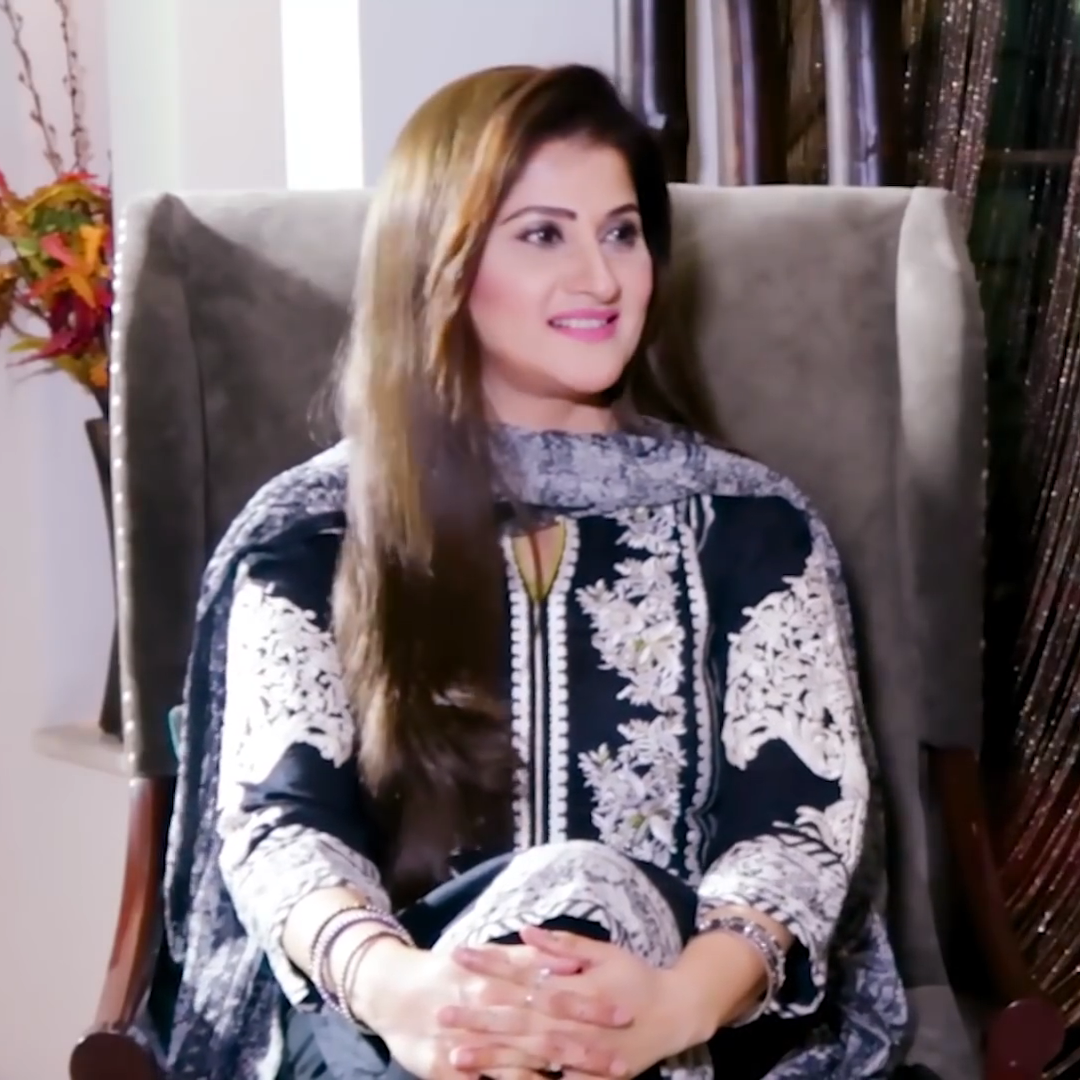
- Sahiba in 2020
- Born: Madiha Ahmad; 5 August 1976 (age 50); Lahore, Punjab, Pakistan
- Occupations: Film actress; Producer
- Years active: 1992 - present
- Spouse: Afzal Khan (m. 1998)
- Children: 2
- Parent(s): Nisho (mother); Inam Rabbani (father)
- Relatives: Hamza Pasha (brother)
- Awards: Nigar Award (1998)

Sahiba Afzal is a Pakistani film and TV actress and producer. She is the daughter of Nisho and Inam Rabbani. She has appeared in several movies in Pakistan, including Hero (1992), Hathi Meray Sathi (1993), Munda Bigra Jaey (1995), Chor Machaye Shor (1996), Lur Da Sheitan (1996), Yawa Gunah Bala Sahi (1996), Ham To Chalay Susral (1996) and Munafiq (2013).

== Early life ==
She was born Madiha, daughter of actress Nisho and Inam Rabbani.

== Career ==
Sahiba started her career as a leading actress in her debut film "Mohabbat ke Sodager", released in 1992. Sahiba's first superhit film was Hero in 1992 with her future husband Jan Rambo and Izhar Qazi. Sahiba's well known films include Hero (1992), Hathi Mere Sathi (1993), Khazana (1995), Munda Bigra Jaye (1995), Mamla Garbar Hai (1996), Hum To Chalay Susral (1996), Chor Machaye Shor (1996), Dil Bhi Tera Hum Bhi Tere (1997), and Zever (1998). She has worked in both Urdu and Punjabi movies. She acted in many films in the 1990s but took a break after marrying fellow actor Afzal Khan, who is popularly known as Jan Rambo for his resemblance to John Rambo, the character played by Hollywood actor Sylvester Stallone. Later, Sahiba appeared in a few TV dramas with her husband.

== Personal life ==
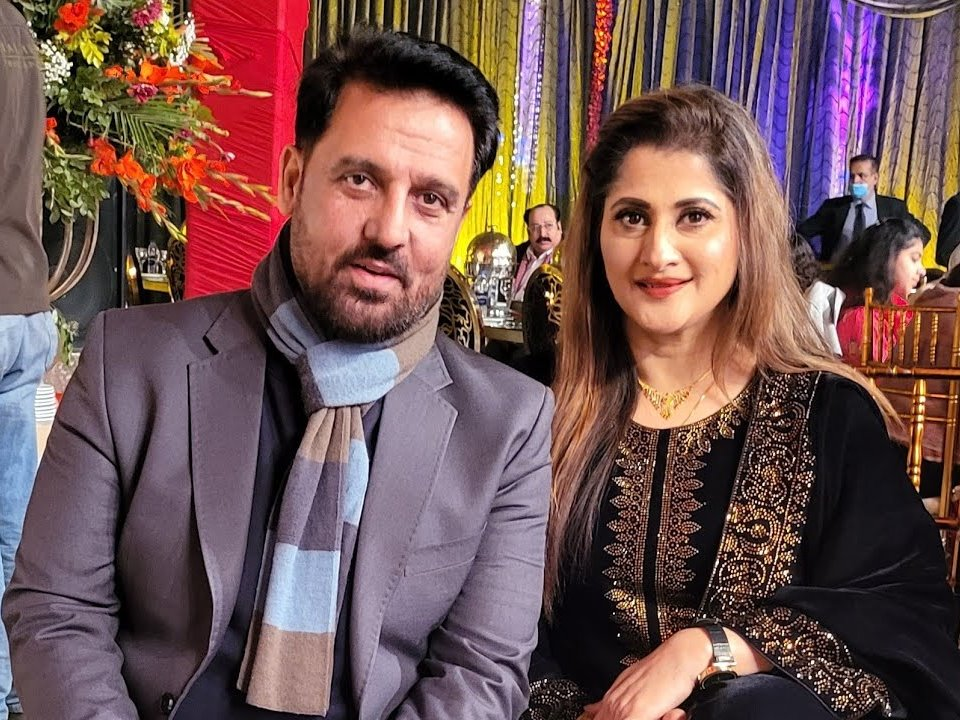
Sahiba and Afzal in 2023

Sahiba married fellow actor Jan Rambo (Afzal Khan) and took a break from the industry. They have two sons. Sahiba's eldest son Ahsan Afzal Khan started acting as well and he made his debut in 2023 in the comedy drama Heer Da Hero on Geo Entertainment.

== Filmography ==
=== Television series ===
| Year | Title | Role | Network |
|---|---|---|---|
| 1995 | Hip Hip Hurray Season 1 | Herself | STN |
| 1996 | Hip Hip Hurray Season 2 | Herself | STN |
| 2012 | Ik Doojay K Liay | Sahiba | PTV |
| 2012 | Pak Villa | Zoni | Geo Entertainment |
| 2015 | Yeh Chahtein Yeh Ranjishein | Eman | PTV |
| 2016 | Chand Aur Chanda | Chanda | ATV |
| 2017 | Boltay Afsanay - Khushboo | Dilnasheen | TV One |
| 2017 | Rani | Faryal | Geo TV |
| 2021 | Thora Sa Pyar | Rabia | SAB TV |
| 2023 | Gunjal | Bano | Aur Life |
| 2023 | Mohabbat Ki Aakhri Kahani | Sitara | Express Entertainment |
| 2023 | Saas Nahi Raas | Saima | Mun TV |
| 2024 | Pagal Khana | Ruqayya | Green Entertainment |
| 2024 | Aafat | Mehak | Geo Entertainment |
| 2025 | Sitaron Se Agay | Rabia | Express Entertainment |
| 2025 | Ishq Di Chashni | Neelima | Green Entertainment |
| 2025 | Aas Paas | Kashifa | Geo Entertainment |
| 2025 | Qubool Hai | Anisa | Express Entertainment |
| 2025 | Visaal-E-Ishq | Fauzia | Green Entertainment |
| 2025 | Mafaad Parast | Alia | Geo Entertainment |
| 2025 | Neeli Kothi | Rabia | Hum TV |
| 2026 | Aye Dil Aazma Nahin | Shireen | Hum TV |
| 2026 | Mitti De Baway | Iqbal's mother | Green Entertainment |

=== Telefilm ===
| Year | Title | Role |
|---|---|---|
| 2021 | Uff Yeh Biwiyan (reloaded) | Zaibmara |
| 2021 | Bakra Aik Qassaie Do | Nida |
| 2021 | Bhoot | Suzanne |
| 2022 | Kanpain Tang Rahi Hain | Falak |
| 2024 | Tamanna Ki Aarzu | Tamanna |
| 2025 | Dil Ne Kaha Dil Se | Aina |

=== Film ===
| Year | Film | Language |
|---|---|---|
| 1992 | Mohabbat Ke Saudagar | Punjabi / Urdu |
| 1992 | Police Story | Urdu |
| 1992 | Ishq Rehna Sada | Urdu |
| 1992 | Hero | Punjabi / Urdu |
| 1992 | Babra | Punjabi |
| 1993 | Guru Chela | Punjabi / Urdu |
| 1993 | Saudagar | Punjabi / Urdu |
| 1993 | Prince | Urdu / Punjabi |
| 1993 | No Babby No | Punjabi / Urdu |
| 1993 | Haathi Mere Saathi | Urdu |
| 1994 | Sanam Bewafa | Punjabi / Urdu |
| 1994 | Actor | Urdu / Punjabi |
| 1994 | Beta | Urdu |
| 1994 | Puttar Jeere Blade Da | Punjabi / Urdu |
| 1994 | Khubsurat Shaitan | Urdu |
| 1994 | Traffic Jam | Punjabi |
| 1995 | Khazana | Urdu |
| 1995 | Munda Bigra Jaye | Urdu |
| 1995 | Panah | Urdu |
| 1996 | Love 95 | Urdu |
| 1996 | Munda Tera Deevana | Urdu |
| 1996 | Chor Machaye Shor | Punjabi |
| 1996 | Maamla Garbar Hai | Urdu |
| 1996 | Yawa Gunah Bala Sahi | Pashto |
| 1996 | Ham To Chale Susral | Urdu |
| 1996 | Miss Istambul | Urdu |
| 1996 | Munda Shararti | Pashto |
| 1996 | Raja Sahab | Urdu |
| 1996 | Cheez Bari Hai Mast Mast | Urdu |
| 1996 | Iqtadar | Punjabi |
| 1996 | Jeetay Hain Shaan Se | Urdu |
| 1996 | Mehndi | Urdu |
| 1996 | Aao Pyar Karen | Urdu |
| 1997 | Hum Kisi Se Kam Nahin | Urdu |
| 1997 | Kuri Munda Razi | Punjabi |
| 1997 | Main Khilari Tu Anari | Urdu |
| 1997 | Najaiz | Urdu |
| 1997 | Khuda Janay | Urdu |
| 1997 | Raja Pakistani | Urdu |
| 1997 | Karishma | Urdu |
| 1997 | Jan Jan Pakistan | Urdu |
| 1997 | Karam Data | Punjabi / Urdu |
| 1997 | Barsat Ki Raat | Urdu |
| 1997 | Dil Bhi Tera Hum Bhi Tere | Urdu |
| 1997 | Dever Deevanay | Urdu |
| 1997 | Sukhan | Punjabi |
| 1998 | Insaf Ho To Aisa | Urdu |
| 1998 | Kabhi Haan Kabhi Naa | Urdu |
| 1998 | Zewar | Urdu |
| 1998 | Khal Nayak | Urdu |
| 1998 | Sahab Bibi Aur Tawaif | Urdu |
| 1998 | Doli Saja K Rakhna | Urdu |
| 1998 | Muhafiz | Urdu |
| 1999 | Chand Babu | Urdu |
| 1999 | Ishq Zinda Rahe Ga | Urdu |
| 1999 | Dil Mein Chupa K Rakhna | Urdu |
| 2000 | Dil Se Na Bhulana | Urdu |
| 2000 | Mr Fraudiye | Urdu |
| 2008 | Pekhawer Kho Pekawer day, Kana | Pashto |
| 2008 | Rab day, Mal Sha | Pashto |
| 2008 | Zargeye May Sho Pagal | Pashto |
| 2008 | Sarkari Raj | Punjabi |
| 2011 | Neyyat Safa Manzil Asan | Pasho |
| 2011 | Sabar May Tamam Sho | Pashto |
| 2011 | Angaar | Pashto |
| 2012 | Har Dam Khair | Pashto |
| 2013 | Munafiq | Pashto |
| 2015 | I Love You Too | Pashto |
| 2015 | Malang Pa Dua Rang | Pashto |
| 2016 | Saya e Khuda e Zuljalal | Urdu |
| 2017 | Dus Khushi Ba Mane | Pashto |
| 2017 | Zakhmona | Pashto |
| 2018 | The Donkey King | Urdu |
| 2019 | De Te Loafari Wei | Pashto |
| 2019 | Handani Gandageer | Pashto |

== Awards and recognition ==
| Year | Award | Category | Result | Title | Ref. |
|---|---|---|---|---|---|
| 1995 | STN Awards | Best New Talent | Won | Hip Hip Hurray Season 1 | |
| 1996 | STN Awards | Best Talent | Won | Hip Hip Hurray Season 2 | |
| 1998 | Nigar Award | Best Supporting Actress | Won | Zewar | |

== Cited work ==
- Gazdar, Mushtaq (1997). Pakistan Cinema, 1947-1997. Oxford University Press. ISBN 0-19-577817-0.
