= Munnu Bhai =

Playwright and journalist from Pakistan

Muneer Ahmed Qureshi (6 February 1933 – 19 January 2018), better known as Munnu Bhai, was a Pakistani newspaper journalist, columnist, poet and writer. He was awarded the Pride of Performance Award by the President of Pakistan in 2007 for his services to the nation. He died on 22 January 2018 in Lahore, aged 84. He was also rewarded Hilal-i-Imtiaz (Crescent of Excellence) Award on 23 March 2018 for his notable literary services.

== Early life ==
He was born as Muneer Ahmed Qureshi in Wazirabad, Punjab, British India on 6 February 1933. He finished his schooling from Government College, Attock. He turned 80 in February 2013 per his own speech made at a public event in his honour in Lahore, Pakistan and reported by Dawn newspaper, Karachi. He also shared another fact about his life in that speech, "I have been a foster brother of a Sikh boy, Gurdutt Singh. His mother nursed me for 15 days or so, because my own mother was sick at that time", he told the audience at a ceremony titled in the Punjabi language 'Munnu Bhai Diyan Sattay Khairan' (lit: 'May Munnu Bhai be blessed in all aspects').

== Career ==
Munnu Bhai started his career by working as a translator for an Urdu language newspaper but eventually developed into a playwright and a dramatist. His career as a drama-writer was primarily devoted to writing plays for Pakistan Television Corporation (PTV). As a playwright, Munnu Bhai's most famous TV drama to date is Sona Chandi released in 1982. He has also written plays like 'Ashiana' and 'Dasht' and contributed in an environmental docudrama- 'Before It's Too Late'. Tamanna, a UK-Pakistani production shot entirely in Pakistan with the soundtrack featuring Rahat Fateh Ali Khan is also written by Munnu Bhai. His name is mostly associated with column writing but Muneer Ahmed Qureshi or 'Munnu Bhai', as he is better known as, has put on paper a few of the most remembered and revered drama serials in Pakistani television history. He has been one of the most outstanding and consistent writers in Pakistan. ‘Sona Chandi' is his most famous drama serial up to date and has won him much praise for his talented writing. A story about a village couple who moves to the city to earn money and attain a better standard of life, it is still etched into the minds of its viewers for its well-built and well executed plot as well as its humorous story line.

He also ventured into long plays, producing immensely entertaining plays such as ‘Gumshuda’ and ‘Khubsurat’ which were well received by the audience and drew favourable comments from the critics. He also wrote another renowned drama serial ‘Ashiyaana’ which was characterised by its buoyant and optimistic plot as well as for highlighting family values. His drama serial ‘Dasht’ was another one of his brilliant works and portrayed the life style, cultural traditions as well as the backwardness of the Balochi tribes based in Gwadar.

His Punjabi poetry is considered one of the best works in recent Punjabi literature and poetry. A regular columnist for the Daily Jang newspaper, Munnu Bhai is considered to be among Pakistan's best and brightest columnists.

== Death and legacy ==
Munnu Bhai died in Lahore, Pakistan on 19 January 2018 at age 84. He had been suffering from kidney and cardiac problems for some time and had been going through dialysis treatment at a hospital.

Pakistan's Information Minister, Pervez Rashid, in a speech at a public event in 2014, to pay tribute to Munnu Bhai, said that Habib Jalib was the only other poet whose poetry reflected the era he lived in. Munnu Bhai, at the same event, said that he learned everything he knows from the common people. Writers should understand that glamour is in realism and they should increase interaction with the common people to write articles close to the hearts of the people.

In 2014, he donated his personal library to Government College University, Lahore for their contribution to promotion of drama and literature.

A major Pakistani English-language newspaper commented after his death, "Apart from his work as a playwright and poet, he also stressed the need for a free media. He said that terrorism, poverty and social degradation could be eliminated by means of truthful journalism. He strongly believed that with time, journalism in Pakistan would mature and perform a constructive role in society."

A veteran Pakistani journalist I. A. Rehman commented about him at a 2013 event to honor Munnu Bhai, "Munnu Bhai always wrote to the purpose, to create awareness among the masses and to kindle hope among them even in worst circumstances."

== Selected works ==
- اجے قیامت نئیں آئی (*Ajay Qayamat Nahi Aayi*, The Doomsday Has Not Come Yet) – A Punjabi poetry collection published in 1977, reflecting themes of human struggle, injustice, and hope.
- جنگل اُداس ہے (*Jungle Udaas Hai*, The Forest Is Sad) – An anthology of newspaper columns highlighting social injustice, human empathy, and political critique.
- فلسطین، فلسطین (*Falasteen, Falasteen*, Palestine, Palestine) – A collection of writings focused on the Palestinian cause and broader issues of global oppression.
- محبت کی ایک سو ایک نظمیں (*Mohabbat Ki 101 Nazmein*, 101 Poems of Love) – A poetic compilation exploring themes of love, longing, and emotional resilience.
- انسانی منظرنامہ (*Insani Manzar Nama*, A Human Panorama) – A collection of translated and original essays reflecting on human dignity and social issues.
- منو بھائی کے گریبان (*Munnu Bhai Ke Gareban*, In Munnu Bhai’s Collar) – A selection of his signature newspaper columns under the title "Gareban", offering commentary on everyday lives and moral conscience.
