= List of Pakistani films of 1995 =

List of Pakistani films by year 1995

This is a list of films produced in Pakistan in 1995.

== 1995 ==
Title	Director	Cast	Genre	Notes
1995
Ainak Wala Jinn		Shah Taj, Abid Kashmiri		
Ajab Khan		Madiha, Badar Munir		
Awargi		Madiha, Shaan, Nadeem		
Baghi Shehzaday		Saima, Sultan Rahi		Also released in Punjabi language. (Double version film)
Chuupay Rustam		Rubi, Umar Sharif, Rahi		Also released in Punjabi language. (Double version film)
Dam Mast Qalandar		Anjuman, Sultan Rahi		Also released in Punjabi language. (Double version film)
Golden Girl		Anjuman, Sultan Rahi		Also released in Punjabi language. (Double version film)
Ham Nahin Ya Tum Nahin		Neeli, Javed, Babra		Also released in Punjabi language. (Double version film)
Jeenay Do		Hina Shahin, Nawaz Khan		Also released in Punjabi language. (Double version film)
Jeeva	Syed Noor	Babar Ali, Resham, Nadeem, Neeli, Javed Sheikh	Action; Drama	Debut film for Babar Ali and Resham. The film was released on March 3, 1995
Jo Darr Gya Woh Marr Gya	Iqbal Kashmiri	Neeli, Javed Sheikh, Atiqa Odho, Reema and Nadeem	Romance; Drama	The film was released on September 22, 1995
Jungle Ka Qanoon		Saima, Sultan Rahi		Also released in Punjabi language. (Double version film)
Kanta		Meera, Mohsin, Talish		Meera's debut film.
Khazana		Sahiba, Nadeem, Izhar		
Khotay Sikkay		Reema, Umer Sharif		Also released in Punjabi language. (Double version film)
Madame Rani	Masud Butt	Anjuman, Ghulam Mohiuddin, Nadeem, Sultan Rahi, Reema Khan	Action	Also released in Punjabi language. (Double version film) Released on May 10, 1995
Mr. K2		Seema Rizvi, Moin Akhtar		
Munda Bigra Jaye	Shamim Ara	Reema, Babar Ali, Sahiba, Jan Rambo	Comedy; Drama	The film was released on April 14, 1995
Muskarahat		Reema, Umar Sharif		
Mushkil	Javed Sheikh	Ghulam Mohiuddin, Nadeem, Neeli, Javed Sheikh	Drama	Javed Sheikh's debut film as a film director. The film was released on March 31, 1995
Panah		Sahiba, Nadeem, Javed		
Sadak (1995 film)		Rahi, Reema, Babar Ali		
Sargam	Syed Noor	Adnan Sami Khan, Zeba Bakhtiar, Nadeem	Musical, Romance, Drama	Adnan Sami's debut film as an actor and a musician. The film was released on September 1, 1995.
Zar Gul	Salmaan Peerzada	Salmaan Ali, Faryal Gohar, Talat Hussain, Jamil Malik, Steve Masty, Babar Peerzada, Imraan Peerzada, Samina Peerzada, Mehmood Sidiqi	Drama	Salmaan Peerzada's debut film as a writer and director.

== See also ==
- 1995 in Pakistan
