= Behkawa =

Pakistani television drama

- Title screen
- Genre: Family drama Social drama
- Written by: Fasih Bari Khan
- Directed by: Mazhar Moin
- Opening theme: "Behkawa" by Qurat-ul-Ain Balouch
- Country of origin: Pakistan
- Original language: Urdu
- No. of episodes: 26

Production
- Running time: Approx 40 Minutes
- Production companies: Media City Productions; NZ Signature Films

Original release
- Network: Geo Entertainment
- Release: 9 February – 18 July 2012

Behkawa is a Pakistani social drama serial produced by Media City Productions and NZ Signature Films, directed by Mazhar Moin and written by Fasih Bari Khan. The drama stars Maria Wasti, Hina Dilpazeer, Adnan Siddiqui, Nirvaan Nadeem and Rubina Ashraf in lead roles. It was originally aired from 9 February to 18 July 2012 on Geo Entertainment.

== Cast ==
- Maria Wasti as Maya
- Hina Dilpazeer as Iftikhar
- Adnan Siddiqui as Zubair
- Samina Ahmed as Sitara's grandmother
- Rubina Ashraf as Maya's mother
- Anoushay Abbasi as Nagmana
- Rashid Farooqui as Sitara's father
- Asma Abbas as Dilshad
- Mirza Shahi as Sitara's grandfather
- Nirvaan Nadeem as Bilal
- Lubna Aslam as Bilal's mother
- Akbar Islam as Zaheer
- Nazli Nasr as Sweetie's mother
- Fazal Hussain as Sajo
- Arisha Razi as Sweetie
- Sara Razi as Sitara
