= Faltu Larki =

Pakistani television drama series

- Title screen
- Developed by: Aamra Shahid
- Written by: Fasih Bari Khan
- Directed by: Mazhar Moin
- Starring: Samiya Mumtaz; Hina Dilpazeer; Anum Fayyaz; Dania Enwer; Jinaan Hussain
- Country of origin: Pakistan
- Original language: Urdu
- No. of episodes: 28

Production
- Producer: Tariq Mujeeb
- Editor: Shahbaz Ali Baloch
- Camera setup: Multi-camera setup

Original release
- Network: A-Plus Entertainment
- Release: 3 November 2016 – 21 April 2017

Faltu Larki (Urdu: فالتو لڑکی, lit. 'Useless Girl') is a Pakistani family drama television series, produced by Tariq Mujeeb. The series aired weekly on A-Plus Entertainment every Thursday from November 2016 to April 2017. It stars Hina Dilpazeer, Anum Fayyaz, Samiya Mumtaz, Dania Enwer and Jinaan Hussain in lead roles.

The series marked the comeback of the Quddusi Sahab Ki Bewah duo, writer Fasih Bari Khan and director Mazhar Moin. That series also starred Dilpazeer in title role.

== Synopsis ==
Faltu Larki tackles the story of a girl who travels from India to Pakistan to live with her family but encounters difficulty. She has to go through a lot of issues in the household and has no say in the state of affairs. The play also takes into account the lives of other female characters involved who also become victim of society’s double standards and its ill treatment of women.

The play points out that women are not given their due rights and are taken for granted quite often. However, it remains to be seen just how the title applies to the lives of these women and whether Faltu Larki aims to change society’s perception of women.

== Plot ==
The plot revolves around a middle-class household from Karachi of two brothers, Anwar-ul-Haq and Siraj-ul-Haq. Anwar runs a shop and has two wives. He likes his second wife Paro more who was the daughter of his deceased friend and is much younger than him. His relations with his first wife Raskha are not so pleasant as she is outspoken and doesn't not like Paro. Raskha's younger daughter Erum is getting married which creates a hustle and bustle in the house. The in-laws of Erum although fulfill their religious duties but are not straight forward people and somehow greedy.

Siraj goes to Bhopal at his cousin's death (whom he likes) and brings her daughter Jahan Ara with him as there she was alone. Jahan Ara lives in Siraj's portion where his wife Almas does not welcome her at first but later accepts her. She is first teased by Yasir but later befriends of his. He is unemployed and his father taunts which disturbs him badly and leading to his further destruction. Jahan Ara observes it and consoles him but Almas sees them together considering that they have an affair. Next day, Yasir confesses to Jahan Ara that he may have talk to many girls, but he loves only her. He talks with his father for his marriage with her but he forbids by taunting him. After the incident, Almas sends Jahan Ara to Paro's house thinking that no man like Yasir is there. In Paro's house, Jahan Ara handles all the kitchen work and also monitors Pashi on her mother's advice as she chats to his class fellow on her phone. Anwar considers the Jahan Ara as a perfect match for Bhai Jaan and discusses it with Paro. Paro who herself once wanted to marry him and keeps eyes on him now too, opposes the idea. Bhai Jaan who himself is also interested in Jahan Ara tells Raska about Jahan Ara whom he wants to marry which she rejects. One day, Yasir tells Paro about his love for Jahan Ara and asks for help to which she agrees as she herself also doesn't want Jahan Ara and Bhai Jaan's marriage.

Mushtari, the washerwoman of the house finds another job at a haveli and from there she brings the marriage proposal of Moazzam Jah for Faiza to which Raskha agrees. Moazzam Jah's sister, Tajwar is a dominating woman, has a strange relation with her tomboyish driver Anwer, and is a matriarch of her house. She wants to get his brother married who has some psychological issues. She calls off Moazzam's wedding with Faiza when it reveals on her that she is not as simple and dumb as she requires after which Mushtari suggests her to marry him with Jahan Ara who is a simple, innocent and orphan maiden. On the other hand, Paro tries to convince Yasir to elope with Jahan Ara to which he refuses stating that Jahan Ara's dignity is very valuable for him. After failing her trap, she then libels on Jahan Ara that she has an affair with a cable guy after which Anwar calls off the decision of her marriage with Bhai Jaan and sends her back to Siraj's house. In his house, Yasir, who is now working in a coaching centre, gains some time to spend with her and tells her that he has changed himself. Meanwhile, the marriage proposal of Moazzam Jah for Jahan Ara is accepted by Siraj and Almas as Tajwar offers them twenty lac rupees in return. When Yasir learns of it, he informs Jahan Ara, but she does not believe him. He tries to call off her wedding and save her but fails but there Jahan Ara also confesses her love for him.

Pashi gets caught with his class-fellow Kashi and Paro beats her furiously. Anwar tries to stop her but in this anger state, the truth slips from her tongue that her love and life with him was always fake, after which Anwar starts to hate her. It turns Anwar towards Raskha, and the things between them sort out and they become happy with each other. After her abortion and facing a lot of domestic abuse and emotional traumas from Tabish and his family, Erum decides to divorce him and returns her house. The strayed young minds of Pashi and Kashi lead them to kill each other as their parents treat them strictly. After Pashi's death, Paro's life gets upside down and Anwar divorces her as she already confessed the truth to him. He decides with Raskha to go for Umrah.

On her wedding day, Jahan Ara decides not to let someone sell her and asks Almas about her price to which she realizes her mistake. In the haveli, Tajwar who is already a patient of epilepsy has another stroke when she sees Anwer and Nimmo (Mushtari's daughter) together. Later, it is revealed that one of their stepbrother returns from abroad and admits Tajwar, Moazzam Jah and their mother who was already mentally challenged, in a mental hospital.

After deciding not to bare that abuse, Jahan Ara goes to police station where she confesses that she has burnt her passport that was actually burnt by Siraj so that she may stay here without nationality. After living in police custody and the completion of legal procedures, she leaves the police station to go to her country, and Yasir who is now a successful businessman goes there to meet her and says that he will visit her there.

== Cast ==
- Salman Shahid as Anwar-ul-Haq
- Hina Dilpazeer as Syeda Raskha Bano, Anwar's first wife
- Samiya Mumtaz as Mah Para "Paro", Anwar's second wife
- Behroze Sabzwari Siraj-ul-Haq, Anwar's younger brother
- Lubna Aslam as Almas, Siraj's wife
- Jinaan Hussain as Faiza, Raskha's elder daughter
- Anum Fayyaz as Erum, Raskha's second daughter
- Tipu Shareef as Arslan aka Bhai Jaan, Raskha's son
- Farhan Ahmed Malhi as Yasir Siraj-ul-Haq, Siraj's son
- Dania Enwer as Jahan Ara, Siraj's niece in relation from Bhopal
- Hareem Sohail as Palwasha "Pashi" Anwar, Paro's daughter
- Sumbul Shahid as Mushtari Bai, washerwoman of the house
- Sarah Razi as Nimmo, Mushtari's daughter
- Imran Ashraf as Tabish, Erum's husband
- Nadia Afgan as Naghmana, Tabish's religious extremist mother
- Sumaiyya Bukhsh as Muneeza, Tabish's sister
- Zubii Majeed as Muneera, Tabish's second sister
- Yasra Rizvi as Tajwar, matriarch of her haveli
- Waqar Hussain as Moazzam Jah, Tajwar's brother
- Seemi Raheel as mentally challenged mother of Tajwar and Moazzam
- Hajra Khan as Anwer, a tomboyish servant in Tajwar's haveli
- Fauzia Mushtaq as Habiba, Naghmana's friend
- Fazal Hussain as Kashi, Pashi's class-fellow

== Reception ==
=== Critical reception ===
Faltu Larki received mixed reviews throughout its broadcast with praise for performances and writing. The News International called the show as "brilliant" and lauded the series to depict the polygamy sensitively.
