= Nirvaan Nadeem =

Pakistani Director, actor, Entrepreneur

- Occupations: Actor; Director; Entrepreneur
- Years active: 2010s – present
- Parent(s): Shahid Nadeem (father); Madiha Gauhar (mother)
- Relatives: Faryal Gohar (aunt)

Nirvaan Nadeem is a Pakistani actor, director and founder/director of Ajoka Institute and Nirvaan Superfoods. As an actor, he has worked on television and theater. He appeared in several Urdu television series including Mohabbat Jaye Bhar Mein, Sehra Teri Pyas and Behkawa, feature film "Baaji" as well as numerous projects for ISPR including "Ehd-e-Wafa", and the Shehzad Roy and Ayesha Omer music video "Meray Dhol Sipahiya".

== Career ==
He was born in Sopore, the son of playwright and former PTV Deputy MD Shahid Nadeem and TV/theater director and Ajoka Theatre founder Madeeha Gauhar. He is a graduate of the National College of Arts.

Nadeem made his debut from PTV as an actor. He first played the leading role in PTV's Sehra Teri Pyas alongside Sanam Baloch.

He also worked in theater as an actor and director and continues to be associated with Ajoka Theatre.

== Filmography ==
- Baaji (2019)

== Television ==
Year	Title	Roles	Notes
2011	Mein Baba ki Ladli		
2011	Sehra Teri Pyas		
2011	Faseel-e-Jaan Se Aagay	LT Zeeshan Shaheed	Episode "Ehd-e-Wafa"
2012	Behkawa	Bilal	
2012	Mohabbat Jaye Bhar Mein	Tariq	
2013	Dil Mohallay Ki Haveli	Shehroze	
2013	Zindagi Udaas Hai Tu		
2014	Main Deewani	Shahzaib	
2014	Do Saal Ki Aurat	Raheel	
2015	Khilona	Sufiyan	
2016	Anabiya	Qasim	
2016	Baba Ki Rani	Akmal	
2017	Is Chand Pe Dagh Nahin	Sajid	
2018	Mohini Mansion Ki Cinderellayain	Billa	
