= Chakkar (TV series) =

Pakistani television series

- Urdu: چکر
- Written by: Rukshana Nigar
- Directed by: Kanwal Khoosart
- Starring: Faryal Gohar; Resham; Zain Afzal; Aamna Malick
- Theme music composer: Zainub Jawwad; Sahir Afzal
- Country of origin: Pakistan
- Original language: Urdu
- No. of episodes: 25

Production
- Producer: Sohaib Idrees
- Production location: Lahore
- Editors: Iftikhar Ahmad; Kaleem Ullah
- Camera setup: Nasir Javed
- Production company: BOL Entertainment

Original release
- Network: BOL Network
- Release: 4 December 2018 – 18 March 2019

Chakkar (Urdu: چکر, lit. 'Cycle') is a 2018 Pakistani television drama series written by Rukhsana Nigar that premiered on 12 December 2018 on Bol Entertainment, directed by Kanwal Khoosat. It stars Resham as a middle-aged woman who becomes bitter due to her stepmother and wants love and affection by marrying. Zain Afzal, Aamna Malick and Faryal Gohar played pivotal roles.

== Synopsis ==
The story is about how a middle-aged woman—whether she is a stepmother or her husband's second wife—copes with her many relations, and who emerges successful in this roundabout of relations.

== Plot ==
Zeba lives in a middle-class locality of Lahore with her father Sajjad, stepmother Kishwar and half-brother Monty. She has great hold on her house as her deceased mother has named the house after her. Over the years, she has developed a great rivalry with Kishwar. Her aunt Nuzhat teaches in a school, whom she calls Nuzhi Aapa is the only friend and guiding figure for her. Kishwar wants to marry Monty first but she marries earlier with a middle-class man Saad in return of some money.

Saad marries her as he was in need of money despite married already. He was not happy with her first marriage with Rija which was done by her mother Nargis. She married with Rija in return that Nargis will help her by giving him money to set his business.

Initially, Zeba gets furious when knows about his first marriage later accept it superficially. She helps Saad in managing his own business by selling the property that her deceased mother has left for her. Zeba helps him to establish his new business but couldn't succeed and ultimately loses her financial means. She tries to prove Rija as charactless girl in front of Nargis but fails ultimately. Saad gets jailed on quarrelling with a fraudee who has grabbed a few lacs from him. The empty-handed Zeba bails him by loan from others.

Their relationship distorts when Zeba cares for him a lot and he in return feels sympathy for Rija. Kishwar and Sajjad who doesn't know that Rija is married to Saad come to her house with a proposal of Monty for Rija after knowing his interest in Rija. She however gets furious over it and tells them the truth. It weakens Zeba's position before her parents and she yells at Saad and Nargis which worsens her relationship with Saad. He starts getting closer to Rija and away from Zeba. She then asks him for divorce to which he tells her to wait till his money to be paid.

Rija gets pregnant and it further increases the distances between Zeba and Saad as she wished him to become a mother but he refused. She tries to re-establish her relationship with Saad but couldn't succeed and due to severe depression gets brain hemorrhage. Nuzhi Aapa takes her to Karachi with her for her better treatment as Sajjad and Kishwar were already hateful to her. The depressed and silent Zeba becomes better after months and joins school with Nuzhi Aapa for a change in her life.

After two weeks of giving birth, Rija dies and shortly after Nargis also becomes partially paralysis due to brain hemorrhage. Saad starts another job for better livelihood and it becomes difficult for him to look after his mother and daughter. On Rija's death Sajjad comes for condolences and Monty starts looking after of his daughter Nida and Nargis. One day Nargis dies and Nuzhi Aapa tries to convince Zeba to go Lahore but fails. Later, Kishwar and Sajjad also starts looking after of Nida. Saad realises his mistakes and he wants a forgiveness from Zeba. She comes to Lahore finally and meets him. They decide to start from a new end where Zeba resolves to become a good mother for Nida.

== Cast ==
- Resham as Zeba / Zebi
- Faryal Gohar as Kishwar
- Aamna Malick as Rija
- Zain Afzal as Saad
- Irfan Khoosat as Sajjad
- Nargis Rasheed as Nargis
- Sania Saeed as Nuzhat / Nuzhi Aapa
- Omar Cheema as Monty
- Kiran Shah as Roshi
- Aitzaz Anjum as Javed
- Adnan Jehangir
- Saad Khalid
- Jawad Butt
- Misbah Butt
- Samina Butt
- Iram Sana
- Shama Rana
- Ajmal Deewan
- Qaiser Latif

== Production ==
In September 2017, it was revealed that Gohar would make her acting comeback after fifteen years and would appear in Kanwal Khoosat's directed Chakkar in which Resham will play the central character. Saeed was cast for special appearance in the series, and she was approached by Fasih Bari Khan, content head of the series. The principal photography started in October of the same year and concluded in December. In November 2018, Resham revealed that the shooting of her series by Kanwal Khoosat is complete from past seven to eight months but hasn't aired yet due to some reasons.
