= Mohini Mansion Ki Cinderellayain =

Pakistani television drama series

- Urdu: موہنی مینشن کی سنڈریلا
- Genre: Social drama Comedy drama
- Written by: Fasih Bari Khan
- Directed by: Ali Tahir
- Starring: Shabnam; Faryal Gohar; Rubya Chaudhry; Hira Khan; Qavi Khan; Naeem Tahir; Yasmeen Tahir; Heena Chaudhry
- Theme music composer: Sahir Ali Bagga
- Country of origin: Pakistan
- Original language: Urdu
- No. of seasons: 1
- No. of episodes: 16

Production
- Producer: BOL Entertainment
- Production location: Lahore
- Editor: Ehtisham Ali
- Running time: 39 - 40 minutes

Original release
- Network: BOL Network
- Release: 3 December 2018 – 18 March 2019

Mohini Mansion Ki Cinderellayain (Urdu: موہنی مینشن کی سنڈریلا ئیں, lit. 'The Cinderellas of Mohini Mansion') is a 2018 Pakistani television comedy drama series that premiered on 3 December 2018 on Bol Entertainment, directed by Ali Tahir and written by Fasih Bari Khan. It stars Qavi Khan and veteran actresses Shabnam and Faryal Gohar in lead roles. The series is produced by Bol Entertainment.

== Cast ==
- Shabnam as Shabana Jharna
- Rubya Chaudhry as Shamamah
- Qavi Khan as Zangu
- Faryal Gohar as Daaro Maasi
- Saima Saleem as Azra
- Hira Khan as Kaali
- Naeem Tahir as Chacha Radio
- Yasmeen Tahir as Zubeida
- Heena Chaudhry as Billi
- Sardar Nabeel as Uzair
- Imaan Malik as Laatu
- Waqas Irfan as Puppu Chocolaty
- Shah Fahad as Maulvi
- Sumbul Shahid as Aapa Jan
- Nirvaan Nadeem as Billa
- Tahira Imam as Mukhtaaran
- Usama Khan as Azmat
- Farah Tufail as Pino
- Umer Darr
- Sakhawat Naz

== Production ==
=== Development ===
In October 2017, Ali Tahir revealed that he is going to direct a comedy serial for Bol Entertainment titled 'Mohini Mansion Ki Cinderellayain' which is scripted by the Quddusi Sahab Ki Bewah-fame scriptwriter Fasih Bari Khan. The serial explores the lives of a whole neighborhood set in 1992 in interior Lahore. He also revealed that there will be over 52 episodes.

=== Casting ===
Veteran actress Shabnam showed her interest in making a comeback to Pakistani television during her visit to Pakistan. Actor and director Ali Tahir cast her as lead protagonist in his directorial, Mohini Mansion Ki Cinderella for Bol Entertainment. Thus the series marks the comeback of Shabnam to Pakistani television screens after 18 years. Veteran actress Faryal Gohar also made her return to television after 15 years with this series. Tahir also cast his parents Naeem Tahir and Yasmeen Tahir. The series also stars the model Rubya Chaudhry and debutants including Miss Veet 2017 winner Hira Khan, and Sardar Nabeel.
