= Jeewan Hathi =

- جیون ہاتھی
- Directed by: Meenu Gaur; Farjad Nabi
- Written by: Fasih Bari Khan
- Story by: Fasih Bari Khan
- Produced by: Shailja Kejriwal; Mazhar Zaidi
- Starring: Samiya Mumtaz; Hina Dilpazeer; Naseeruddin Shah; Saife Hassan
- Cinematography: Rana Kamran
- Edited by: Armaghan Hasan
- Music by: Sahir Ali Bagga; Ali Aftab Saeed
- Production company: Matteela Films
- Distributed by: zee5
- Release dates: 17 July 2016 (LIFF); 4 November 2016 (Pakistan)
- Running time: 60 minutes
- Country: Pakistan
- Language: Urdu
- Box office: Rs. 6.50 crore (US$230,000)

Jeewan Hathi (Urdu: جیون ہاتھی, English: The Elephant in the Room) is a 2016 Pakistani dark comedy film directed by Meenu Gaur and Farjad Nabi, written by Fasih Bari Khan and produced by Shailja Kejriwal and Mazhar Zaidi. The film stars Samiya Mumtaz, Hina Dilpazeer, Naseeruddin Shah, Saife Hassan and Adnan Jaffar.

== Cast ==
- Samiya Mumtaz
- Hina Dilpazeer as Natasha
- Naseeruddin Shah
- Fawad Khan
- Saife Hassan
- Adnan Jaffar
- Nimra Bucha
- Kiran Tabeer
- Jahangir Khan
- Nazarul Hassan
- Ayesha Omer

== Production ==
Jeewan Hathi is produced under Matteela Films. The film is directed by the duo of Meenu Gaur and Farjad Nabi, who directed Zinda Bhaag (2013). The film is written by Fasih Bari Khan, produced by Shailja Kejriwal and co-produced by Vikas Sharma. The cast of the film includes Samiya Mumtaz, Hina Dilpazeer, Naseeruddin Shah, Saife Hassan, Fawad Khan, Adnan Jaffar, Nazarul Hassan and Kiran Tabeer.

Dilpazeer said in an interview that she would play the role of a morning show host at the television channel of her husband, played by Shah. She said that the film was shot in Karachi.

== Soundtrack ==
The soundtrack of the film consists of two songs by Ali Aftab Saeed and Sahir Ali Bagga, with lyrics by Hasan Mujtaba.

== Release ==
The film was first screened at London Indian Film Festival on 17 July 2016 and subsequently at the Locarno International Film Festival on 11 August 2017. It was scheduled to be released across Pakistan on 4 November 2016.
