= Mohabbat Jaye Bhar Mein =

Television series

- Written by: Fasih Bari Khan
- Directed by: Mazhar Moin
- Starring: Sajal Aly; Resham; Adnan Siddiqui; Hina Dilpazeer; Naeema Garaj; Imran Aslam
- Opening theme: "Muhabbat Bhar Mei Jaye" by Shibani Kashyap
- Country of origin: Pakistan
- Original language: Urdu

Production
- Producer: Momina Duraid
- Running time: approximately 45 minutes

Original release
- Network: Hum TV
- Release: 2 September 2012 – 27 January 2013

Mohabbat Jaye Bhar Mein (Urdu: محبَت جاۓ بھاڑ میں, lit. 'Let Love Go to Hell') is a Pakistani drama television series produced by Momina Duraid. Written by Fasih Bari Khan and directed by Mazhar Moin, it tells the story of a lower locality flat building where scandals are born galore. It premiered on Hum TV on 2 September 2012 and last aired on 27 January 2013.

== Plot ==
Mohabbat Jaye Bhar Mein is a story that focuses on characters from the middle-class area of Karachi who live in the same apartment building. It mainly focuses on two females, Shagufta and Neeli. Neeli is a high school girl who loves to live in a fantasy world. Trying to break out of the struggles of a low-income family, Neeli tries to date boys who have money so they can buy her things and take her out to fancy restaurants. Neeli's mother delivers a child every year. Due to many children in a low-income family, and the lack of attention for each child, none of the siblings get along. Since Neeli's parents cannot afford to buy them the nicer things in life, Neeli and her sister escape to Shagufta's house to borrow make-up, jewellery, and clothes.

Shagufta is an attractive woman, admired by many men who want to be romantically involved with her. She is unmarried, and although she does not physically go to work, she makes her income from owning partial shares of a nearby shop. Shagufta has a mother who is mentally insane and a brother affected by Down Syndrome. Her neighbours misunderstand Shagufta and look down on her for being single, having a crazy mother and going out late at night (usually to meet men). Jealous of Shagufta's good looks, many neighbours, including Neeli's mother, think that Shagufta is a whore, but deep down inside, Shagufta is a very caring woman and has a heart of gold, going above and beyond to help someone in need.

Shagufta falls in love with a cable technician who works in the apartments named Nasser, and she wants to marry him. Nasser is promiscuous and eventually falls for Neeli, whom he sees dancing at a friend's wedding. When Shagufta and Neeli argue, Neeli decides to hurt Shagufta by starting an affair with Nasser.

Other characters in the story, such as Neeli's dad, Basharat, and older brother, are also madly in love with Shagufta. Mohabbat Jaye Bhar Mein has many comedic scenes, but it is a far deeper drama, showing the viewers the internal pain and suffering of the many characters.

== Cast ==
- Sajal Aly as Neeli
- Arisha Razi/Resham as Shagufta
- Hina Dilpazeer as Nasreen, Neeli's Mother
- Adnan Siddiqui as Basharat, Neeli's Father
- Imran Aslam as Nasir, Neeli and Shagufta's boy friend
- Minal Khan as Rani, Neeli's younger sister
- Fareeha Jabeen as Shagufta's mother
- Naeema Garaj as Zubeida, Nasreen's mother
- Raza Zaidi as Mubashir, Neeli's brother
- Nirvaan Nadeem as Tariq, Nasir's friend
- Fazal Hassain as Gullu, Neeli's brother
- Rashid Farooqi as Ismail, Nasreen's cousin
- Rehana Kaleem as Kokab, Nasreen's friend
- Sohail Masood as Shagufta's father (only in flashback)
- Ubaida Ansari as Zubeida's sister-in-law
- Adnan Gabol as Shagufta's brother
- Zahida Batool
- Bilal Ahmad
- Syed Karam Hussain
- Mohammad Ali

== Soundtrack ==
Mohabbat Jaye Bhar Mein's title song Mohabbat Bhar Mei Jaye is sung by Shibani Kashyap, composed by Shoaib Farrukh and Farrukh Abid and lyrics by Fasih Bari.
