= Hunerkada College of Visual and Performing Arts =

Fine arts college in Islamabad, Pakistan

Hunerkada College of Visual and Performing Arts was established by Artist Association of Pakistan as a Fine Arts college in Islamabad, Pakistan.

The college was founded in 1992 as a non-government and not-for-profit organization with a commitment to promote Visual and Performing Arts. It was established by a well known Pakistani Artist Jamal Shah with a vision to share his skills and knowledge about visual & performing arts to the generations. Currently, its campuses are located in Islamabad and Lahore.

It offers four-year Degree programs in Fine Arts, Textile Design, and Fashion Design in affiliation with the University of Sargodha. It also has a masters program in process with the said university. It has a branch in Lahore as part of its policy of establishing branches in all major cities.

The college offers different courses and programs in Painting, Drawing, Sculpturing, Print Making, Photography, Film Making, Music, Dance, Textile Design, Graphic Design, Fashion Design, Miniature, Calligraphy, Ceramics, Interior Design, Hand Embroidery and Embellishment, Web Design and Development, Jewelry and Accessories, Auto CAD, Textile Weaving, Fabric Printing, Pattern Drafting and Cutting, etc.

== Hunerkada Films ==
- Revenge of the Worthless (2016)

== Location Hunerkada, Lahore Campus ==
- "Hunerkada College of Visual and Performing Arts" (Map). Google Maps.
