= 7 Din Mohabbat In =

- film poster
- Urdu: سات دن محبت اِن
- Directed by: Meenu Gaur; Farjad Nabi
- Written by: Fasih Bari Khan
- Starring: Mahira Khan; Sheheryar Munawar
- Cinematography: Rana Kamran
- Edited by: Rizwan AQ
- Music by: Arshad Mehmood; Shuja Haider; Shani Arshad
- Production companies: Dawn Films; IMGC Global Entertainment
- Distributed by: Distribution Club; B4U Motion Pictures
- Release date: 16 June 2018 (Eid al-Fitr)
- Running time: 138 min
- Country: Pakistan
- Language: Urdu
- Box office: Rs. 13 crore (US$470,000)

7 Din Mohabbat In (lit. 'Love in 7 Days') is a 2018 Pakistani romantic comedy fantasy film. It was directed by Meenu–Farjad under Matteela Films. Written by Fasih Bari Khan, the film features Mahira Khan and Sheheryar Munawar in lead roles and also stars Amna Ilyas, Mira Sethi, Hina Dilpazeer and Javed Sheikh. It was released on Eid al-Fitr, 16 June 2018, under the production banners of Dawn Films and IMGC Global Entertainment, and has been distributed by Distribution Club in Pakistan and by B4U Motion Pictures internationally.

It received mixed reviews from critics. Some praised the film's strong performances and striking visuals, while some criticised the lead characters and the storyline. Despite this, the film was a box office success.

== Plot ==
Tipu (Sheheryar Munawar) is a young introverted man who works in a jewellery shop. He dreams of a girl who would be his one true love. A girl Neeli (Mahira Khan) also lives with him and his mother (Hina Dilpazeer). Tipu doesn't show any affection towards her but Neeli is always affectionate towards him. Tipu's mother dislikes Neeli and mistreats her. She wants to get her out of her house by getting her to marry a goon named Naseer Kankatta (Shamoon Abbasi).

One day Tipu inadvertently approaches a mysterious man who gives him a magic bottle to solve his problem. A jinn (Javed Sheikh) comes out of it and introduces himself as Dwarka Prasad from New Delhi. He gives Tipu a deadline of seven days in which he must get a girl to say "I love you", but she has to have a mole on her face. If he fails to do so, the Djinn will take him as his servant to hell. He tells Tipu that his time starts right now which incidentally is 12 'o' clock but Tipu discovers that the actual time was 30 mins behind so in reality it was 11:30.

So, Tipu starts his search for a girl with a mole on her face with the help of his friend Tingu Master (Danish Maqsood) but fails many times. Tingu suggests to him a feminist named Ghazala (Amna Ilyas) as she has a mole on her face. Tipu succeeds in inviting Ghazala on a date in a restaurant. Whilst on a date, Dwarka puts a bomb in Ghazala's bag and informs the police which results in her getting arrested and imprisoned.

After his failed attempt, Tipu is approached by a rich old lady named Pino (Beo Zafar) who tells him that she needs a necklace delivered right away which she had ordered earlier for her granddaughter Princess Sonu (Mira Sethi) who is arriving that day from England via (Frankfurt). Upon reaching Sonu's mansion, Tipu discovers that Sonu also has a mole on her face. Tipu also realises along with Sonu that her father lured her to Karachi intentionally so he can marry her off to his bad-tempered nephew Sadiq Moti (Adnan Shah Tipu). Pino suggests to her that she should marry Tipu who can help her get rid of Sadiq. So, while Ghazala is imprisoned this provokes Tipu to go for Sonu because of the time he has left with the Djinn. Whilst trying to woo Sonu, he inadvertently falls head over heels in love with Neeli.

Sonu succeeds in eloping from Sadiq with Tipu to a hotel where Dwarka tries to interrupt them. Tipu finds out there that Sonu is in love with Fadi. Neeli becomes suspicious and Dwarka takes her to the hotel where she discovers that Tipu is there with Sonu whilst courting her and assumes he's cheating. Tipu reveals to Neeli that Sonu is in love with Faadi (Emmad Irfani) which pacifies Neeli. Tipu is relieved and approaches Neeli to tell her he is all hers but Neeli tells him that she has already accepted Naseer's proposal and will marry him the very next day. Tipu is heartbroken.

On the 7th day which is also Neeli's wedding day, Dwarka bails out Ghazala from jail disguised as Tipu's family lawyer and lies to her that Tipu is marrying Neeli. Enraged Ghazala teams up with her feminine group to go and break up the wedding. Upon reaching she realises its not Tipu's wedding. After finding out the whole story Tipu gains sympathy from Ghazala and confronts Naseer with her help. Tipu and Neeli are happily united and Tipu reveals to her the truth about Dwarka's challenge and his deadline. But by then, Dwarka appears and everyone vanishes except Tipu and Neeli. He wounds Tipu but Neeli reveals that she also has a mole near her ear. Dwarka ensures them that they are late as it was twenty-five minutes past twelve. But Neeli reveals to him that he is following New Delhi's time while there are still five minutes left until twelve according to Karachi's time. She quickly says "I love you" and their true love empowers Dwarka.

In the end, an empowered Dwarka gets attention of Tipu's mother as she recognizes him as a man she loved while she was in Delhi. They eventually fall for each other while Tipu and Neeli happily marry.

== Cast ==
- Sheheryar Munawar as Tipu
- Mahira Khan as Nilofar "Neeli"
- Javed Sheikh as Dwarka Prasad
- Hina Dilpazeer as Tipu's mother
- Aamir Qureshi as Naseer Kankatta
- Amna Ilyas as Ghazala
- Mira Sethi as Princess Sonu
- Rimal Ali as Mona Lisa (dance performance in song "Saudai Saiyan")
- Ayesha Omer as Tipu's date partner (special appearance)
- Beo Zafar as Parveen "Pino"
- Adnan Shah Tipu as Sadiq Moti
- Mohammed Ehteshamuddin (cameo)
- Emmad Irfani as Faadi (cameo)
- Danish Maqsood as Tingu Master
- Fareeha Jabeen

== Production ==
=== Development ===
On 11 April 2016, Herald Entertainment, a company of the Dawn Media Group, signed a contract with Matteela Films, which also included to work on a film with the directorial duo Meenu Gaur and Farjad Nabi of Zinda Bhaag (2013) fame. Written by Fasih Bari Khan, Saat Din Mohabbat In was announced by Dawn Films on 1 March 2017 as their debut production, "this moving film promises to be both a visual and musical treat for moviegoers," said an official spokesperson. On 17 July, it was reported that IMGC Global Entertainment signed an agreement to co-produce the film. Distribution Club Pvt Ltd was appointed the nationwide distributors. Speaking about the film, Sanam Mehdi; the executive producer of Dawn Films said, "I believe this film will be the beginning of a new era in Pakistani cinema."

=== Casting ===
Mahira Khan and Sheheryar Munawar were signed in the lead roles, and their names were revealed as the film was announced. It will be their second mutual film after Ho Mann Jahaan (2016). Khan said, "I am doing a comedy film for the first time ever. I am nervous about it and excited as well."

The cast that were initially signed in supporting roles include Amna Ilyas, Mira Sethi, Imran Aslam, Rehana Saigol, Rimal Ali, Aamir Qureshi and Adnan Shah Tipu. Ilyas commented on her role that "You can also call this girl a feminist, because "she believes in equality between men and women." Rimal Ali said, "I was approached for the movie by producer, Sanam Mehdi and I knew I had to do it." Sethi signed this as her debut film, she said about her role, "I am playing a British character".

On 22 August, it was announced that Javed Sheikh will also be a part of the film, on which he commented, "We need more light hearted stories like these that have the potential to entertain the audience". On 31 October, it was announced that the Bulbulay fame actresses Ayesha Omer and Hina Dilpazeer too joined the cast. Dilpazeer commented on her second film with Meenu–Farjad, "I feel the audiences will love its unique storyline."

=== Filming ===
After having rehearsals throughout July, the principal photography began on 1 August 2017 in Karachi, while the last spell was shot in November 2017. Rana Kamran has served as the cinematographer.

== Soundtrack ==
Film music has been composed by Arshad Mehmood, Shuja Haider and Shani Arshad. Wahab Shah joined the crew as choreographer.

No.	Title	Lyrics	Music	Singer(s)	Length
1.	"Yunhi Rastay Mai"	Piyush Mishra	Shuja Haider	Ali Sethi, Aima Baig	4:52
2.	"Kaahe Ko Biyahi Bides"	Amir Khusrow	Waqar Ali	Abu Muhammad, Fareed Ayaz	6:09
3.	"Saudai Saiyan"	Shakeel Sohail	Shiraz Uppal	Neha Chaudhry	3:14
4.	"Jawai Noon"	Ashraf Ali	Ashraf Ali	Waqar Ehsin	4:01
5.	"Ishq Lara"		Shani Arshad	Shani Arshad and Natasha Baig	3:20
Total length:					21:36

== Release ==
=== Box office ===
According to the box-office report, Saat Din Mohabbat In has managed to make Rs. 5.3 crores in Pakistani theaters on the Eid weekend. The film collected 8.05 crores in its 1st week including the next Friday. The film also collected 1.6 crores overseas in its first week. It collected 1.75 crores in its 2nd week, making its total domestic gross up to 9.8 crores. According to reports of 10 July, the film had already grossed 10.35 crores in Pakistan. The worldwide gross of film is 13 crores .

=== Home media ===
Saat din Mohhabat In was made available for streaming on Netflix.

=== Critical reception ===
The film generally gathered positive reviews but some criticised it for its storyline and noted resemblance to Bollywood movies.

Shaheera Anwar from The Express Tribune gave a positive review with a rating of 3.5/5, stating ''All in all, 7DMI boasts of power-packed performances which will keep you entertained, even if you don't quite take to the script.'' She praised the film's direction, dialogues and cast, and rewarded the film with the verdict as ''If you're looking for beautiful sets, hilarious punch lines and some PG-rated comedy, 7DMI is your best bet.''

Omair Alavi of Samaa TV praised the unique storyline, believable characters, and performances of the cast, including Sheheryar Munawwar, Mahira Khan, and Jawed Sheikh, but criticized the unnecessary and poorly executed item song and the slow-paced first half, also noting similarities with foreign films like Bedazzled and Cinderella.

Asjad Khan of HIP praised its visual effects and wrote that "It’s very safe to say that 7DMI has utilized CGI and sound design better than any other Pakistani film". The editor also praised its screenplay and all in all praised the actors especially Mahira Khan and wrote "In a very different role Mahira Khan proves that she is a versatile actress".

Amna Zaidi of Siddy Says praised the direction and wrote "The directors have made sure everything, from the Karachi backdrop, to the background music, styling of characters, dialogues, action and comedy all play in harmony with each other delivering an entertaining flick". She also praised the leading actors and complimented on Sheheryar Munawar, as "Tipu played by Sheheryar Munawar is the highlight of the film, not only does he act like a dorkey 29 year old to perfection, he looks amazing on screen" and praised Mahira Khan, writing that "Mahira is definitely on a roll and a journey to reinvent herself, and she is doing it like a boss. Her comic timing and expression show a new side of her, and you can't help fall in love with Neeli’s firecracker character".

Aparita Bhandari of CBC Arts praised the film for its stand for female empowerment, dealing with LGBT issues and more powerful hidden elements.

Mahwash Ajaz of Khaleej Times wrote that "While the film retains some pithy dialogues and lags at some points, it stays fresh and intelligent for the most part. The film may be a departure from the dark and gritty Zinda Bhaag but it is no less smart. This is perhaps what can truly wow the audience: Meenu and Farjad take care of the smallest of details, they add important messages, play on metaphors and transformations, they take the best of Pakistani stage qualities, boil down the macabre theatre and turn it into gold."

Areebah Shahid from Bolo Jawan gave the film 2.5 out of 5 stars. While the reviewer praised the film saying that it "wonderfully captures Karachi. It embraces both its wondrous lights and its heaps of garbage; its Urdu speaking residents and its Punjabi settlers; its feminist sub-culture and its drama queens", but criticised it stating that, "7 Din Mohabbat In is strictly a one-time watch that is unlikely to appeal to maturer audiences. Watch only because it is the better of the three options this Eid and because Pakistani cinema needs your support."

Another review was given by Khusro Mumtaz from The News International, who wrote ''By the end, the movie limps across the finish line in a completely predictable fashion.''

Dawn's staff writer Anum Rehman Chagani gave 4 out of 5 stars, praising the direction and visual effects, and said ''7DMI wouldn't have been bearable if it wasn't so darn visually appealing.'' She feels that few scenes were inspired by other movies, and wrote ''While Fasih Bari Khan is an intelligent writer, no doubt about it, the movie's story was a let-down.'' She praised the performances, specially from Mahira Khan ''With every role she takes on, it's becoming evident she's on a mission to reinvent herself, step out of her comfort zone and grow as an actor.''

== See also ==
- List of Pakistani films of 2018
