= Traffik =

- Genre: Drama
- Written by: Simon Moore
- Directed by: Alastair Reid
- Starring: Bill Paterson; Julia Ormond; Juraj Kukura; Lindsay Duncan; Fritz Müller-Scherz; Tilo Prückner; Faryal Gohar; Jamal Shah; Talat Hussain
- Music by: Tim Souster
- Country of origin: United Kingdom
- Original language: English
- No. of series: 1
- No. of episodes: 6

Production
- Producer: Brian Eastman
- Cinematography: Clive Tickner
- Editors: Neil Thomson; Jon Gregory; Andrew McClelland
- Production company: Picture Partnership Productions

Original release
- Network: Channel 4
- Release: 22 June – 24 July 1989

Traffik is a 1989 British television serial about illegal drug trade. Its three stories are interwoven, with arcs told from the perspectives of Afghan and Pakistani growers, dealers and manufacturers, German dealers, and British users. It was nominated for six BAFTA Awards, winning four, including for Best Drama Series or Serial. It also won an International Emmy Award for best drama. The 2000 crime drama film Traffic, directed by Steven Soderbergh, was based on the miniseries. In turn, the 2004 American television miniseries Traffic was based on both versions.

== Background ==
The six-part serial was produced by Britain's Channel 4, written by Simon Moore and directed by Alastair Reid. In the United States, it first aired on Masterpiece Theatre in 1990.

== Cast ==
- Bill Paterson as Jack Lithgow, a Scottish Home Office minister engaged in combating heroin importation from Pakistan.
- Julia Ormond as his drug addicted daughter Caroline.
- Juraj Kukura as Karl Rosshalde, a German drug smuggler.
- Lindsay Duncan as Rosshalde's English wife Helen.
- Fritz Müller-Scherz and Tilo Prückner as the German detectives attempting to bring down Rosshalde with the help of informer Jacques Ledesert (Peter Lakenmacher)
- Jamal Shah as Pakistani opium poppy grower Fazal, who is evicted from his land as a result of policies encouraged by the British government.
- Talat Hussain as Pakistani drug lord Tariq Butt, the supplier of Rosshalde's European heroin network.
- Faryal Gohar as Roomana, daughter of the Pakistani magistrate; she later shows Lithgow the extent of the deception Tariq Butt has foisted upon customs officials.
- Ismat Shahjahan as Sabira, Fazal's wife.

== Episode list ==
No.	Title	Original release date
1	"The Farmer"	22 June 1989
2	"The Addict"	26 June 1989
3	"The Criminal"	3 July 1989
4	"The Chemist"	10 July 1989
5	"The Politician"	17 July 1989
6	"The Courier"	24 July 1989

== Reception ==
The miniseries currently has an average rating of 83% on Rotten Tomatoes. Writer Suan C. Boyd acknowledges the miniseries for giving different perspectives of the global war on drug trade, going as far as to claim that Traffik is the only film sample that includes the poppy grower in depth.

== Awards and nominations ==
Year	Award	Category	Result
1989	International Emmy Award	Drama	Won
1990	BAFTA Awards	Drama Series or Serial	Won
1990	BAFTA Awards	Design	Won
1990	BAFTA Awards	Film Cameraman	Won
1990	BAFTA Awards	Film Sound	Won
1990	BAFTA Awards	Film Editor	Nominated
1990	BAFTA Awards	Original Television Music	Nominated

== Home media ==
The miniseries was released on DVD on 26 June 2001 by Acorn Media.
