= Yeh Zindagi Hai =

Pakistani comedy-drama television series

- Title card
- Written by: Fizza Jaffri; Salma Zafar; Javeria Saud
- Directed by: Kamran Akbar Khan; Syed Atif Hussain
- Starring: Javeria Saud; Saud; Alyy Khan; Sidra Batool; Ismail Tara; Noman Habib; Beenish Chohan; Behroze Sabzwari; Esha Noor; Hina Dilpazeer; Adeel Chaudhry; Shabbir Jan; Ubaida Ansari; Momal Sheikh; Shahroz Sabzwari; Naveed Raza; Sahir Lodhi; Junaid Akhter
- Country of origin: Pakistan
- Original language: Urdu
- No. of seasons: 2
- No. of episodes: Season 1: 281; Season 2: 50

Production
- Producers: Javeria Jalil; Saud
- Running time: approximately 45 minutes

Original release
- Network: Geo Entertainment
- Release: 12 May 2008 – 2013

Yeh Zindagi Hai (Urdu: یہ زندگی ہے, lit. 'This Is Life') is a Pakistani Urdu language comedy-drama television series that aired on Geo Entertainment from 2008 to 2013. It initially starred Javeria Saud, Saud Qasmi, Moammar Rana, Hina Dilpazeer, and Sana Fakhar. It became one of the longest-running television series in the history of Pakistani television, airing for six and a half years with more than 300 episodes. Yeh Zindagi Hai was hugely popular from its premier and made its leading actress, Javeria Saud, a star.

Shahrezad Samiuddin of Dawn found it low-brow and melodramatic but argued that its popularity represents genuine public taste that should not be dismissed.

== Premise ==
The show is about a middle-class family. It features sisters, Saeeda and Bano, and their children. Saeeda has two daughters, Hajira and Jamila, and a son, Bhola. Bhola married their neighbor's daughter, Nargis, without the family's permission and has a son named Jamal. Jamal has liked Jamila since childhood, but Jamila likes Momi. Saeeda asks Jamila for a dowry for Hajra's wedding, enraging Jamila.

== Cast ==
- Javeria Saud as Jamila and Chameli
- Saud as Shirazi
- Imran Urooj as Jamal, Jamila's cousin and love interest
- Alyy Khan as Jalal Ahmad
- Sidra Batool as Jannat "Jenny" Shirazi
- Salma Zafar as Saeeda, Jamila's mother
- Ismail Tara as Tara Qasai
- Parveen Akbar as Bano, Jamal's mother
- Naeema Garaj as Shakira, Saeeda's neighbor
- Sherry Shah as Pinki, Jamal's love interest
- Noman Habib as Bhola Jr.; Jamila's son
- Fahad Mustafa as Bhola Sr., Jamila's brother
- Beenish Chohan as Nargis, Bhola's love interest
- Behroze Sabzwari as Laddan
- Hina Dilpazeer as Hajira, Jamila's eldest sister
- Mehmood Qasmi as Majid, Hajira's husband
- Sana Fakhar as Sana
- Moammar Rana as Momi
- Ghazala Jawaid as Paarvati, Pinki's mother
- Adeel Chaudhry as Kam (Kamal)
- Junaid Akhter as Salman
- Esha Noor as Jabbo
- Momal Sheikh as Jalebi
- Shahroz Sabzwari as Sheroz
- Christina Albert as Saloni
- Faizan as Rehan
- Naveed Raza as Laddo
- Zainab Qayyum as Dil Araam
- Sahir Lodhi as Sameer
- Sangeeta as JB's mother-in-law
- Fareeda Shabbir as Joja, Laddan's wife
- Ubaida Ansari as Kulsoom

=== Guest appearances ===
- Majid Khan (2008)
- Humayun Saeed (2010–2011)
- Nida Yasir (2013)

== Episodes ==
=== Episode 1-100 ===
==== Jamila's Love ====
A woman, whose son is being tutored by Jamila, fires Jamila after her son discovers the affair between Momi and Jamila.

==== Jamila's TV Work ====
Jamila contacts Majid's friend, Kamal, who works at a television station. A misunderstanding develops, and Jamila leaves the house. Kamal takes Jamila to a Kotha rather than a TV station.

==== Scenes of Kotha ====
At the Kotha, an angry supervisor tells Jamila she can never go home because there is no return door.

==== Entrance of Shirazi ====
At the Kotha, Jamila meets Shirazi who has come to see the Mujra. Shirazi is wealthy, with businesses in Dubai and Pakistan. His daughter, Jannat, was raised by Sultana, Shirazi's aunt. Shirazi helps Jamila escape from the Kotha.

==== Jamila's Return Home ====
Jamila thanks Shairazi for helping her. Because she was gone for so many days, Jamila's family believes she has run away with someone. Shirazi takes Jamila home, but her family questions why she returned and tells her to leave. To smooth the situation, Shirazi lies and says that he has married Jamila, which causes Jamila's mother to beat her. After Jamilla falls into his arms, Shirazi takes her to his car, while Jamal watches and tells them no one would believe them.

==== Jamila and Shairazi's wedding ====
Shirazi takes Jamila to his home; Jamila is surprised to see a large house. Shirazi introduces Jamila to Sultana and her daughter. He tells Sultana that Jamila is a guest tonight but she will own the house tomorrow. Jamila is unhappy and confused about whether or not she should marry Shirazi. Sultana convinces Jamila to marry Shairaza by telling her that his wife died a year ago and that he is a very kind man. However, Sultana tells Shairazi to take some time before the marriage, as every girl has opinions about her marriage arrangements; Shairazi agrees with Sultana. Jamila overhears this conversation and, now willing to marry Shirazi because of his extreme wealth, tells him there is no need to delay the marriage. Suspicious that Sultanta does not want her to marry Shairazi, Jamilia asks him about the conversation. He says she only heard part of the conversation and explains what Sultana meant. Shirazi gives Jamilla shopping money; she is happy when she sees a shopping mall for the first time. The couple marry several days later.

==== Death of Nargis's Child/Jamila's Divorce ====
When Nargis loses her child because of Hajira, her mother takes her back. Shirazi is fed up with Jamila's behavior. Through Bhola, he finds out about Jamila's affair with Jamal and divorces her. Jamila blames her mother for her divorce. Saeeda tries to arrange Bhola's second marriage, but Nargis comes back to him.

==== Jamila's Second Marriage to Jamal ====
Jamal causes drama over the marriage of his stepmother's daughter Pinki. Pinki advises him to marry Jamila. Hajira marries to Majid. After Hajira's marriage, Saeeda feels Jamila's pain. When Jamal proposes to Jamila, she tells him of Kotha and her married life with Shirazi. Jamal realizes how selfish and senseless they are. After many challenges, Jamila agrees to marry Jamal.

==== Fight with Jamila ====
Jamal and Jamila fight. Jamal leaves their home to live with Pinki.

==== People on Rent ====
Two women, Hazoori and her sister Dil Araam, and their uncle, Mammon Hazoor, rent the upper floor of Saeeda's house. This episode explores the poor living conditions of all people and the sadnesses of Saeeda and her renters.

==== Shairazi Marries Dil Aram/Jamila Re-marries Shairazi ====
Shirazi and Jamila are alone and Jamila is pregnant. For her child's future, Jamila decides to divorce Jamal and remarry Shirazi. After Shairaz helps Jamila and her family, she goes to his house and says she has something to tell him. At the same time, Shirazi says he also has something to say, and Jamila tells him to go first.

==== Dil Araam's Love ====
Dil Araam's lover has left but returns to say he is sorry and wants to marry her. Saeeda convinces Dil Araam to marry her lover.

==== Back to Hazoori Begum and Mamoon Hazoor ====
After Dil Araam's marriage, Hazoori and Mamoon Hazoor decide to live elsewhere.

=== Episodes 100-135 ===
In the future, Jamila's son, Bhola, becomes a taxi driver. Pinki's son, Kamal, is a pop star.

== Production ==
According to director Syed Atif Hussain, the channel heads push for glamorous content frustrated him, leading to come up with the concept of Yeh Zindagi Hai, a show with relatable characters and minimal glamour. Atif however departured after 32 episodes.

== Release ==
Yeh Zindagi Hai aired Sundays at 9:00 P.M on Geo TV. Sony Entertainment Television Asia broadcast the show Sundays at 8.00 P.M., starting in November 2009.

== Reception ==
The series became popular due to the on-screen chemistry of the real-life couple Saud and Javeria Saud. Initially, the series was praised for its unique plot and ensemble cast, but over the years the series ultimately received criticism due to its unrealistic and melodramatic plot. When asked about the show's long-term popularity in an interview with The Nation, actress Javeria Saud commented, ''It is not that its popularity lessened with time. In this era in which we run after ratings and where dramas are turned down if they do not bring the required rating, Yeh Zindagi Hai continued to run for six and a half years in prime time. This is proof of its consistent popularity.''
