= Revenge of the Worthless =

2016 Pakistani Urdu, Pashto and English-language film

- Theatrical release poster
- Directed by: Jamal Shah
- Written by: Jamal Shah
- Based on: Real-life Events
- Produced by: Amna Shah
- Starring: Jamal Shah; Shamil Khan; Maira Khan; Firdous Jamal; Ayub Khoso; Emil Karakose
- Cinematography: Aamir Tehseen Rao
- Edited by: Malik Irfan
- Music by: Mehdi Raza
- Production company: Hunerkada Films
- Distributed by: Summit Entertainment
- Release date: 22 July 2016
- Running time: 150 minutes
- Country: Pakistan
- Languages: Urdu; Pashto; English

Revenge of the Worthless is a 2016 Pakistani Urdu, Pashto and English-language action drama film featuring the directorial debut of Jamal Shah with an assistant direction of Zohaib Akhtar and produced by Amna Shah under production banner Hunerkada Films. The film casts Jamal Shah, Ayub Khoso, Firdous Jamal, Shamil Khan, Maira Khan, Noor Bukhari in a cameo, and Emel Karakose along with new talent, the students of Hunerkada College of Visual and Performing Arts.

== Plot outline ==
The film depicts a brutally disfigured cultural narrative of a land with the enviable cultural heritage highlighting the heroic struggle of a few unsung heroes against Taliban terrorists during the 2009 Swat Insurgency.

Jamal Shah plays the lead, Zarak Khan, whose wife and two daughters refuse to leave their ancestral home. They decide to fight the invaders, along with their household staff. Tragedy leads to the end of Zarak Khan, three servants, and one daughter.

== Cast ==
- Jamal Shah as Zarak Khan
- Firdous Jamal as Maulana Sufi Mohummed
- Ayub Khoso as Ameer Qudratuullah
- Imran Tareen as Janan Khan
- Shamil Khan as Arbaz Khan
- Maira Khan as Shabana
- Noor Bukhari in Cameo
- Emil Karakose as Palwasha
- Iftikhar Qaiser as Ustad
- Asfandyar Khan as Taliban
- Qumber Ali as Taliban
- Saad Farukh Khan as Arab Doctor.
- Bilal Khattak as Masoom Khan
- Abdul Rahim Langove as Gulalai
- Iram Rehman as Zarlashta
- Kaleem Achakzai as Ismael
- Asif Shah as Kareem Kaka
- Agha Mustafa Hassan as Sher Khan
- Zubair Achakzai as Commander Mansoor
- Qazi Zubair as Malik Qahar Khan
- Meheryar Khan as Taliban

== Marketing ==
First look title poster was revealed on 26 November 2015 and teaser trailer on 15 January 2016. Theatrical trailer and poster was revealed on 5 April 2016. Final look poster and theatrical trailer was released on 15 January 2016.

== Release ==
Firstly, the film was scheduled to release on 22 May 2015 but it was postponed because of Zimbabwe cricket tour to Pakistan after the 6 years ban on Pakistan tours. The director thought it may affect the film business as matches were being held in Lahore, the Lollywood city. The film was scheduled for 15 January 2016 release but yet again the film was postponed. The film was passed uncut by CBFC for release on 22 July 2016.

== See also ==
- List of directorial debuts
- List of Pakistani films of 2016
