= Kiran Tabeer =

Pakistani actress and television host

- Born: March 7, 1990 (age 36); Lahore, Pakistan
- Occupations: Actress; model; television host
- Years active: 2011–present
- Spouse: Ali Hamza Safdar (m. 13 January 2011)
- Children: 2

Kiran Tabeer (کرن تَبیر; born 7 March 1990) is a Pakistani television actress, model, and former television host. She has appeared in numerous Pakistani television dramas and in film, and is best known for her role as Saeeda in the HUM TV drama serial Parizaad (2021–2022).

== Early life and career ==
Details of her education are not publicly documented.

Tabeer began her career as a television host, appearing on the comedy programme Hum Sub Umeed Se Hain on Geo TV. She subsequently transitioned to acting, making her drama debut in 2011. Her early television work included supporting appearances in Dil Ka Darwaza (2014) and Kitna Satatay Ho.

She appeared in the Pakistani dark comedy film Jeewan Hathi (2016). Her subsequent television work included roles in Tum Kon Piya, Hatheli, Ishq-e-Benaam, Saaya (2018), and Meri Baji, among others.

Her most prominent role to date is that of Saeeda — the sister of the title character — in Parizaad (2021–2022), a critically acclaimed HUM TV drama written by Hashim Nadeem and directed by Shahzad Kashmiri, in which she appeared in seven episodes alongside Ahmed Ali Akbar and Yumna Zaidi.

== Personal life ==
Tabeer married Ali Hamza Safdar, a businessman, on 13 January 2011. The couple have two children, including a daughter named Izzah Hamza Malik.

== Filmography ==
=== Television ===
Year	Title	Role	Network
2014	Dil Ka Darwaza		
2016	Tum Kon Piya		ARY Digital
2016	Hatheli	Samiya	HUM TV
2017	Ishq-e-Benaam		HUM TV
2017	Sikwa Nahi Kisi Se	Sonia	
2018	Saaya	Saba	Geo Entertainment
2018	Meri Baji		
2021–22	Parizaad	Saeeda	HUM TV
2021	Uraan		

=== Film ===
Year	Title	Role
2016	Jeewan Hathi	
