= Do Saal Ki Aurat =

Pakistani television series

- Genre: Drama; Romance film
- Written by: Amir Raza
- Directed by: Chaudhary Ali Hassan
- Starring: Samiya Mumtaz; Umair Rana; Noor ul Hassan; Nayyer Ejaz
- Country of origin: Pakistan
- Original language: Urdu
- No. of seasons: 1
- No. of episodes: 21

Production
- Executive producers: Kashif Nisar; Qaiser Ali
- Camera setup: Multi-camera setup
- Running time: 1 hour
- Production company: Karachi Entertainment

Original release
- Network: Hum TV
- Release: 1 October – 11 December 2014

Do Saal Ki Aurat (Urdu: دو سال کی عورت; lit. Woman of 2 Years) is a Pakistani television drama series that was first aired from 1 October to 11 December 2014. It is directed by Chaudhary Ali Hassan and written by Amir Raza.

== Cast ==
- Samiya Mumtaz as Hajra
- Umair Rana
- Noor ul Hassan
- Nayyer Ejaz
- Ali Tahir
- Farah Shah
- Munazzah Arif as Faria
- Nirvaan Nadeem as Raheel
- Hanzala Shahid
- Muhammad Sadoon
- Bonita Malik
