= Tum Ho Ke Chup =

Pakistani television series

- Original title: تم ہو کہ چُپ
- Written by: Asghar Nadeem Syed
- Directed by: Haseeb Hassan
- Starring: Humayun Saeed; Ayesha Khan; Abid Ali; Hina Khawaja Bayat; Hina Dilpazir
- Theme music composer: Waqar Ali
- Country of origin: Pakistan
- Original language: Urdu
- No. of episodes: 21

Production
- Producer: Khurram Raza
- Editor: M. Aamir Qureshi
- Camera setup: Ali Hafeez

Original release
- Network: Geo Entertainment
- Release: 30 April 2011 – 2011

Tum Ho Ke Chup (Urdu: تم ہو کہ چُپ, lit. 'And yet you are silent') is a Pakistani television series directed by Haseeb Hassan and written by Asghar Nadeem Syed. It aired on Geo Entertainment in 2011. It stars Ayesha Khan, Humayun Saeed, Abid Ali, Hina Dilpazir and Zarrar Khan. The series revolves around the struggle of a foreign returned girl against the feudal system in Baloch culture.

== Cast ==
- Abid Ali as Sardar Jamal Khan
- Humayun Saeed as Mir Zarrar Khan
- Ayesha Khan as Mishal
- Hina Khawaja Bayat as Bibi Janam
- Hina Dilpazeer as Saazein Bibi
- Fiza Ali as Parivarsh
- Tehreem Zuberi as Bibi Zaitoon
- Zeba Ali as Bibi Gulbano
- Syed Jibran as Nomi
- Faisal Shah as Birbal
- Zarrar Khan as Sikander
- Shehroz Sabzwari as Zeeshan

== Production ==
The series was shot in Quetta, Balochistan and London, UK.

== Awards and nominations ==
Year	Award	Category	Recipient(s)/ nominee(s)	Result	Ref.
2012	Lux Style Awards	Best Television Actress - Satellite	Hina Dilpazir	Nominated	
