= Chand Grehan =

Pakistani television series

- Title screen
- چاند گرہن
- Genre: Drama
- Written by: Asghar Nadeem Syed
- Directed by: Tajdar Alam
- Starring: Huma Nawab; Shafi Muhammad Shah; Faryal Gohar; Ayaz Naik; Tahira Wasti
- Country of origin: Pakistan
- Original language: Urdu
- No. of seasons: 1
- No. of episodes: 15

Original release
- Network: STN
- Release: 1995 – 1995

Chand Grehan (Urdu: چاند گرہن, lit. 'Lunar Eclipse') is a 1995 Pakistani television drama series written by Asghar Nadeem Syed and directed by Tajdar Alam. It aired on Shalimar Television Network.

== Plot ==
Chand Grehan centres on the tension between political influence and social class. Shehrbano (Huma Nawab), a woman from a wealthy family, wishes to marry Nasir (Ayaz Naik), but the disparity in their social backgrounds prevents the union.

== Cast ==
- Huma Nawab as Shehrbano
- Ayaz Naik as Nasir
- Shafi Muhammad Shah as Lal Hussain Shah Sahab
- Faryal Gohar as Gulbahar Begum
- Tahira Wasti as Khanum
- Shakeel as Babar Sahab
- Sajida Syed as Mrs. Babar
- Abdullah Kadwani as Amjad
- Sheema Kermani as Ameer-ul-Nisa
- Gulab Chandio as Dil Bahar
- Ubaida Ansari as Mai Bhagaa
- Qaiser Naqvi as Dai
- Mehmood Akhtar as Sodagar
- Qazi Wajid as Kamal Sahab
- Sohail Asghar as Jahanian Shah
- Rubi Niazi as Shireen
- Latif Kapadia as Lateef Bhai
- Roshan Atta as Mai Muradan

== Accolades ==
Year	Award	Category	Recipient	Result	Ref.
1995	Nigar Award	Best Director	Tajdar Alam	Won	
