= Jinnah (film) =

1998 film by Jamil Dehlavi

- Theatrical release poster
- Directed by: Jamil Dehlavi
- Screenplay by: Akbar S. Ahmed; Jamil Dehlavi
- Produced by: Jamil Dehlavi
- Starring: Christopher Lee; Shashi Kapoor; James Fox; Maria Aitken; Robert Ashby; Richard Lintern; Shireen Shah; Indira Varma; Shakeel
- Narrated by: Shashi Kapoor
- Cinematography: Nicholas D. Knowland
- Edited by: Robert M. Reitano; Paul Hodgson
- Music by: Nigel Clarke; Michael Csányi-Wills
- Production company: The Quaid Project Limited (UK)
- Distributed by: Dehlavi Films Productions
- Release dates: 2 September 1998 (Pakistan); 7 November 1998 (UK)
- Running time: 110 minutes
- Countries: Pakistan; United Kingdom
- Languages: English; Urdu
- Budget: $6 million
- Box office: $150,000

Jinnah (Urdu: جناح, romanised: Jinnāh) is a 1998 British–Pakistani epic biographical film directed by Jamil Dehlavi, who co-wrote the screenplay with Akbar S. Ahmed. It follows the life of Muhammad Ali Jinnah, the founding father of Pakistan, and stars Christopher Lee in the lead role as Jinnah.

To make this film, Shashi Kapoor wanted to invest $1 million. He became the subject of controversy in India and Pakistan for acting in the film. Jinnah was shown in Mill Valley Film Festival on 15 October 1999. Sir Christopher Lee also starred as the title character in Jinnah. In his autobiography, Lee challenged Jamil Dehlavi's credibility as a director, describing Dehlavi as "indecisive and without enough experience to communicate easily on the set", and recalling occasions when the cameraman "effectively direct[ed] many of the scenes" while Dehlavi "stood like a rabbit in the headlights". Former Channel 4 executive Farrukh Dhondy also helped write the screenplay for the film for £12,000. Ahmed and Dehlavi later became involved in a financial dispute.

== Plot ==
The film opens with the words of Professor Stanley Wolpert:

Few individuals significantly alter the course of history.
Fewer still modify the map of the world.
Hardly anyone can be credited with creating a nation-state.
Muhammad Ali Jinnah did all three.

A guide takes Jinnah to 1947, where, at the Cromwell Conference with Lord Mountbatten, he demands a homeland for Indian Muslims.

In flashbacks, the guide recounts Jinnah's marriage to the Parsi Rattanbai Petit, known as Ruttie, whom he marries against her parents' wishes because of their religious differences and age gap. In 1922, Jinnah becomes politically isolated as he devotes himself to promoting moderation amid growing Hindu-Muslim hostility, straining his marriage. Ruttie eventually leaves him with their daughter, and they separate. Her subsequent death from cancer deeply affects Jinnah and strengthens his determination to establish Pakistan. He returns to British India and pursues the two-nation theory. At the Muslim League's 1940 annual conference, he assures thousands of Muslims that Pakistan will be created.

The Guide asks Jinnah whom he loves most apart from Ruttie and his sister Fatima. He names his daughter, who had married a Parsi man without his permission.

In 1947, Muslim fanatics attack a Muslim League conference, arguing that a Muslim state cannot grant equal rights to women and non-Muslims. Jinnah rejects their extremism, insisting that Islam needs people with the vision to build the country. The partition of India follows, and Jinnah and the Guide witness Muslims being massacred during migration by Hindus and Sikhs. Jinnah becomes the first Governor-General of Pakistan and appoints Liaquat Ali Khan as the first Prime Minister of Pakistan. He bids farewell to Dina, who promises to visit but remains in Bombay with her husband and child.

After independence and the end of British rule, Pakistan emerges as a new nation and refuge for the subcontinent's Muslims, and Jinnah receives the title Quaid-e-Azam. He awaits the first train carrying Muslim refugees from India, only to find everyone aboard dead except an infant.

Fatimah and Lady Edwina Mountbatten visit refugees, prompting Lady Mountbatten to recognise the importance of independence. Meanwhile, the Hindu Maharaja of Kashmir, Sir Hari Singh, delays choosing between India and Pakistan. Mountbatten betrays Jinnah, and amid an October 1947 revolt aided by Pakistani irregulars, the Maharaja accedes to India and Indian troops are airlifted into Kashmir. Jinnah orders Pakistani troops into the region, beginning a war between India and Pakistan that contributes to the continuing Kashmir conflict.

The film concludes with Jinnah and Lord Louis Mountbatten, 1st Earl Mountbatten of Burma, the last Viceroy of India, before a Heavenly Court, where Jinnah accuses Mountbatten of betrayal. Jinnah and his angelic judge then return to the scene of Muslim refugees, where Jinnah expresses sorrow over their suffering during the division of Punjab. The refugees respond by chanting "Pakistan Zindabad", ending the film.

== Cast ==
- Christopher Lee as Muhammad Ali Jinnah
  - Richard Lintern as Muhammad Ali Jinnah (Younger)
- Shashi Kapoor as Narrator
- James Fox as Lord Louis Mountbatten
- Maria Aitken as Edwina Mountbatten
- Shireen Shah as Fatima Jinnah
- Indira Varma as Rattanbai ('Ruttie') Jinnah
- Robert Ashby as Jawaharlal Nehru
- Sam Dastor as Mahatma Gandhi
- Shakeel as Liaquat Ali Khan
- Vaneeza Ahmed as Dina Wadia
- Nafees Ahmed as Dina Wadia (Younger)
- Shoaib Shaikh as Neville Wadia
- Roger Brierley as Judge
- Vernon Dobtcheff as Lord Willingdon
- Rowena Cooper as Lady Willingdon
- James Curran as Colonel Knowles
- Michael Elwyn as Sir Cyril Radcliffe
- Ian Gelder as the English police officer
- Christopher Godwin as Recruitment officer In charge
- John Grillo as Sir Dinshaw Petit
- Talat Hussain as Refugee
- Ubaida Ansari as Ayah
- John Nettleton as General Gracey
- David Quilter as Porrit
- Khayyam Sarhadi as Abdur Rab Nishtar
- David Sterne as Birtwhistle
- Marc Zuber as Allama Muhammad Iqbal
- Shahid Iqbal as Barrister M. C. Chagla
- Mervyn Hosein as Abul Kalam Azad
- Nausheen Masud as Student
- Stephen Mortlock as the English Reporter
- Sana Mohammad Abul Fetouh as Zakiya

== Soundtrack ==
Jinnah

Soundtrack album by Nigel Clarke and Michael Csányi-Wills

Track listing
| No. | Title | Lyrics | Singer(s) | Length |
|---|---|---|---|---|
| 1. | "Azadi" | Salman Ahmad (composition), Sabir Zafar | Ali Azmat, Samina Ahmed |

== Critical reception ==
The film received an overwhelmingly positive response in Pakistan. Christopher Lee spoke highly of the film, calling his performance in it the best of his career as well as stressing the importance of the film.

The most important film I made, in terms of its subject and the great responsibility I had as an actor was a film I did about the founder of Pakistan, called Jinnah. It had the best reviews I've ever had in my entire career — as a film and as a performance. But ultimately it was never shown at the [world] cinemas.

However, the choice of Lee to play the lead role led to a large amount of media controversy in Pakistan because of his previous roles in horror films and vampire films as Count Dracula, with Lee having received death threats which required personal bodyguards during filming. The BBC reported that the threats were due to his previous film roles and not that he was a European playing an Asian. Some critics even demanded a ban on the film.

== Awards ==
- Grand Prize - Zanzibar International Film Festival
- Best International Film - World Film Awards, Indonesia
- Gold Award Best Foreign Film - Worldfest Flagstaff
- Silver Award, 1999 - WorldFest-Houston International Film Festival
- Golden Pyramid Award Nomination - Cairo International Film Festival

== See also ==
- List of Islamic films
- Cinema in Pakistan
- List of Asian historical drama films
- List of artistic depictions of Mahatma Gandhi
- List of artistic depictions of Sheikh Mujibur Rahman
