= Lazwaal Ishq =

Laazwal Ishq

- لَزَوَال عشق
- Genre: Reality dating show
- Presented by: Ayesha Omar
- Country of origin: Pakistan
- Original language: Urdu
- No. of episodes: 100 (planned)

Production
- Production locations: Istanbul, Turkey
- Running time: Variable

Original release
- Network: YouTube
- Release: 29 September 2025 – present

Lazwaal Ishq (Urdu: لَزَوَال عشق; transl. Eternal Love or Undying Love) is a 2025 Pakistani Urdu-language reality dating show hosted by actress Ayesha Omar. The series is filmed in Turkey, and started out with featuring eight Pakistani contestants, four men and four women, living together in a luxury villa while forming romantic connections and competing in various challenges. The show have since spiraled into an, almost, pure bullying show where the host is not acting in the best interest of the contestants. The program is regarded as the first Urdu-language dating reality show produced for digital platforms in Pakistan. It has attracted widespread attention and debate for introducing a Western-style dating format into Urdu media.

The constants have complained, in interviews, about lack of diversity in food and drinks, only being served bread and eggs.

Compared to other countries "Love Island", this production lacks direction, responsibility, and actual romance/love or intrigues past bullying based on precived mental health and/or skin color.

== Format ==
The show follows eight single contestants who live under one roof in a villa located in Istanbul, Turkey. Participants compete in relationship-based games, emotional challenges, and compatibility tests. Throughout the series, contestants pair up, switch partners, and face eliminations based on performance, viewer engagement, or in-show decisions.

The final objective is to form the most compatible couple, who are declared the winners of Lazwaal Ishq. Unlike most Pakistani reality programs, the series is released exclusively on YouTube and not broadcast on television.

== Production and development ==
Lazwaal Ishq was announced in September 2025 through social media teasers. The concept is adapted from the Turkish show Aşk Adası (Love Island Turkey). Filming took place in a villa overlooking the Bosphorus in Istanbul, showcasing modern architecture and scenic landscapes.

According to media reports, the show consists of approximately 100 planned episodes. Its host, Ayesha Omar, described it as a “relationship-based entertainment format,” denying that it was a conventional dating show.

=== Contestants ===
- Sheraz Ali
- Junaid Akhter
- Fahad Khan
- Hamza Abbasi
- Umair Farooq
- Maaz Ahmed
- Jannat
- Fatima Jinnah
- Batool Abidi
- Laiba Raees
- Urooj Shamim
- Hamza Gul
- Ashir Azeem
- Memoona Qudoos
- Tuba Khan
- Tabassam Akram
- Ayesha Sajjad
- Meer Hamza
- Imaan Lakhani

== Release ==
The first episode premiered on September 29, 2025 on YouTube, following the teaser’s release earlier that month. The launch episode reportedly reached over 125,000 views within a few hours of release.

== Reception and controversy ==
Lazwaal Ishq received mixed reactions upon announcement and release. Critics argued that the show’s themes—dating, cohabitation, and romantic intimacy—conflicted with Pakistani social and religious norms.

Calls for a ban circulated online, prompting a clarification from the Pakistan Electronic Media Regulatory Authority (PEMRA). The authority stated that Lazwaal Ishq is not being broadcast on any licensed television channel and therefore falls outside its regulatory scope.

Ayesha Omar responded to criticism by explaining that the show promotes healthy conversation and emotional understanding rather than physical intimacy. Some viewers have praised it as a bold step toward modern digital entertainment in Pakistan, while others continue to criticize its format.

== Cultural impact ==
The show has sparked conversations about modernization, gender norms, and media regulation in Pakistan. Media analysts have linked its popularity to the rise of streaming-first entertainment, bypassing state-regulated broadcast channels and giving producers greater creative freedom.
