= Jamal Shah =

Pakistani actor

- جمال شاہ

Chairman Silk Road Culture Center, Former Federal Minister of National Heritage and Culture
- Caretaker
- In office 17 August 2023 – 4 March 2024
- Prime Minister: Anwaar ul Haq Kakar; Shehbaz Sharif
- Preceded by: Marriyum Aurangzeb (as Minister of Information & Broadcasting)
- Succeeded by: Attaullah Tarar (as Minister of Information & Broadcasting)

Personal details
- Born: 1 March 1956 (age 70) Quetta, Balochistan, Pakistan
- Spouse(s): Faryal Gohar (div.) Amna Shah
- Education: Slade School of Fine Art; National College of Arts; University of Balochistan
- Occupation: Actor; director; singer; painter; sculptor
- Awards: Ordre des Arts et des Lettres

Jamal Shah (Pashto: جمال شاہ, born 1 March 1956) is a Pakistani actor, director, musician, writer, sculptor, painter, and social activist. He has also served as the Federal Minister of Culture in the Kakar caretaker cabinet. In 2021, Shah was awarded the Ordre des Arts et des Lettres from the French Minister of Culture.

== Early life and education ==
Shah was born into a Pashto speaking Syed family in 1956 in Quetta, Balochistan, Pakistan. His paternal uncle Aziz Jan Agha was an artist and would serve as his early role model.

Shah's family opposed pursuit of art as an unviable line of profession and wanted him to be a doctor, so he applied for admission to Bolan Medical College and did well enough to get in but he told his family he hadn’t made it and went for a BSc in Geology instead. He then received a Master's degree in English literature from the University of Balochistan in 1978, graduated from the National College of Arts in Lahore in 1983, and later obtained a Master's degree in fine arts from the Slade School of Fine Art in London, United Kingdom.

== Personal life ==
In 1983, he married actress Faryal Gohar. Their marriage ended in divorce after nine years. Shah described the contrast in their personalities as the cause of their divorce.

== Career ==
=== Music ===
Shah began his association with television in 1976 as a singer and composer. He remained actively involved in Pashto musical programming for approximately 15 years, during which he became a widely recognized and respected performer. His music continues to be well regarded among Pashto-speaking audiences in Pakistan and Afghanistan.

=== Painting and sculpture ===
In 1984, Shah established the Fine Arts Department at the University of Balochistan and headed it until 1986. In 1985, he founded the Artists Association of Balochistan and also was appointed the first Chairman of the Artist Association of Pakistan.

He founded the Hunerkada College of Visual and Performing Arts in Islamabad in 1992 and later became a Telenor Pakistan brand ambassador doing television productions under the banner of Hunerkada Productions.

In 2007, Shah became the executive director of Pakistan National Council of the Arts (PNCA) in Islamabad, Pakistan, and then was appointed its Director General in October 2016. His tenure at PNCA ended on 22 September 2019 with him stating in an interview with Alyan Khan that he "did not want any extension". In 2019, Shah was the President and Chief Curator of the first Islamabad Art Festival.

In 2022, he sculpted a bronze bust of Pakistani Nobel laureate Dr Abdus Salam, which was unveiled by the director general of International Atomic Energy Agency, Yukiya Amano at IAEA's 61st general conference.

=== Films and television ===
During his time at the NCA, Jamal Shah undertook limited work for Pakistan Television (PTV), primarily in music-related programming. After returning to Quetta, he began acting in PTV drama serials. He appeared in Band Galli, written by Ashfaq Ahmed, and also authored a stage play on coal miners titled Kohkan. Much of Jamal Shah's work during this period consisted of PTV drama productions that addressed socially and politically sensitive themes, including political intrigue in Tapish and the subject of AIDS in Kal.

During the 1980s he began to have an international recognition, being called "the next Omar Sharif" and getting a role in the 1989 Channel 4 television serial Traffik, but he refused most of these offers as they clashed with his Islamic values.

In 1991, Shah made his feature film debut in the film K2, directed by Franc Roddam, and since then, he has appeared in many other movies and TV dramas.

Shah made his directorial debut with the 2016 film Revenge of the Worthless.

== Selected filmography ==
=== Films ===
Year	Film	Role	Actor	Director	Writer
1991	K2	Malik	Yes		
2016	Ho Mann Jahaan	Manizeh's father	Yes		
2016	Revenge of the Worthless	Zarak Khan	Yes	Yes	Yes
2016	Hijrat		Yes		

=== Television series ===
Year	Name	Role	Writer	Producer	Director	Network
1975	Kokan		Yes			PTV
1976	Band Gali					PTV
1985	Naqab e Zan					PTV
1986	Jungle					PTV
1988	Madar	Inspector Zark Khan				PTV
1989	Tapish	Waleed Raza				PTV
1989	Traffik	Fazal				Channel 4
1990	Parosi	Malik Iqbal				NTM
1990	Palay Shah	Palay Khan	Yes			PTV
1993	Baarish Kay Baad	Jahangir				PTV
1995	Kal			Yes		PTV
2006	Tere Pehlu Mein					PTV
2010	Chunri					PTV
2014	Aag	Raja Safraz	Yes	Yes	Yes	PlayMax
2016	Saya-e-Dewar Bhi Nahi	Shahab Shah				Hum TV
2023	Tere Ishq Ke Naam	Mehr Ali Khan				Ary Digital

== See also ==
- Pakistan National Council of the Arts
- Artist Association of Pakistan
- Hunerkada College of Visual and Performing Arts
- List of Lollywood actors
- Traffik
