= Artist Association of Pakistan =

Artist Association of Pakistan is an association of artists in Pakistan. Artist Association of Pakistan also established Hunerkada College of Visual and Performing Arts as a fine arts college in Islamabad, Pakistan.

== See also ==
- Hunerkada College of Visual and Performing Arts
- Jamal Shah
