= Rimal Ali =

Pakistani transgender model and actor

- رِمل علی
- Born: Rimal Ali Shah; Faisalabad, Punjab, Pakistan
- Occupations: Model; actress; dancer; activist
- Years active: 2016–present
- Known for: First openly transgender actress in Pakistani cinema
- Notable work: 7 Din Mohabbat In (2018); "Dhola" (2017)

Rimal Ali Shah (Urdu: رِمل علی) is a Pakistani transgender model, actress, dancer, and activist. She made her film debut in 2018 with Saat Din Mohabbat In.

== Early life and education ==
Rimal Ali was born in Faisalabad, Punjab, Pakistan. She holds a Bachelor of Commerce degree from the University of Punjab.

== Career ==
Rimal first gained widespread public attention in early 2017 through her appearance in the music video for "Dhola" by the Pakistani band Soch, which was released in January 2017. She made her film debut in 2018 with Saat Din Mohabbat In.

== Filmography ==
- Saat Din Mohabbat In (2018) as Mona Lisa
- Rehbra

== See also ==
- Mehak Malik
