= Kitna Satatay Ho =

Television series

- Written by: Fasih Bari Khan
- Directed by: Mazhar Moin
- Starring: Arij Fatyma; Adnan Siddiqui; Rubina Ashraf
- Opening theme: "Kitna Satatay Ho"
- Country of origin: Pakistan
- Original language: Urdu
- No. of episodes: 25

Production
- Producer: Momina Duraid
- Running time: 30–45 minutes

Original release
- Network: Hum TV
- Release: 17 May – 22 November 2015

Kitna Satatay Ho (Urdu: کتنا ستاتے ہو, lit. 'How much do you bother me') is a 2015 Pakistani romantic drama serial. It first aired on 17 May 2015 Hum TV. The series was directed by Mazhar Moin, written by Fasih Bari Khan, and produced by Momina Duraid. The drama aired Sunday evenings. The show ended on 22 November 2015. The script by Fasih Bari Kahn was praised by Dawn's critics as one of the best from 2015, "for his complete and masterful understanding of the human condition and showing us a more gritty reality" The series stars Arij Fatyma in the lead role.

== Plot ==
A typical household story, where sisters-in-law are always trying to bring each other down. The story revolves around family politics and greed.

== Cast ==
- Arij Fatyma as Amna
- Adnan Siddiqui as Hassan
- Rubina Ashraf as Bhabhi
- Usman Peerzada as Zubair
- Kiran Tabeir as Rabia
- Raheela Agha as Nuzhat
- Huma Nawab as Hammad's aunt
- Rubina Ashraf as Rabia's mother
- Junaid Akhtar as Hamaad
