= Ubaida Ansari =

Pakistani actress

- Born: 25 July 1936; Aligarh, Uttar Pradesh, British India
- Died: 21 March 2014 (aged 77); Karachi, Sindh, Pakistan
- Education: University of Karachi
- Occupation: Actress
- Years active: 1960–2014
- Children: 2

Ubaida Ansari (1936–2014) was a Pakistani actress. She acted in numerous television dramas. She was known for her roles in dramas Quddusi Sahab Ki Bewah, Yeh Zindagi Hai, Meri Saheli Meri Humjoli, Rehaai and Zard Mausam.

== Career ==
In 1960 she started working at Radio Pakistan in Lahore. She was noted for her high-pitch voice and for her work in the dramas Zeenat, Khala Kulsoom Ka Kumba and Tum Hi To Ho. She also appeared in dramas Saagar Ka Ansoo, Stolen and Mera Muqaddama Tum Laro Gay. In 1998 she appeared in the movie Jinnah. She also appeared in the drama Yeh Zindagi Hai and Yeh Zindagi Hai Season 2 as Kulsoom which was the longest-running television series. She later appeared in a variety of dramas including Quddusi Sahab Ki Bewah, Zard Mausam and Rehaai.

== Personal life ==
Ubaida was married and had two children.

== Illness and death ==
She died at the age of 78 on 21 March 2014 in Karachi.

== Filmography ==
=== Television ===
| Year | Title | Role | Network |
|---|---|---|---|
| 1982 | Ankahi | Nurse | PTV |
| 1985 | Karawaan | Chanal | PTV |
| 1985 | Guriya | Sister | PTV |
| 1986 | Saaey | Bua Begum | PTV |
| 1988 | Saagar Ka Ansoo | Raeesani | PTV |
| 1988 | Seerhiyan | Bua | PTV |
| 1989 | Aab-o-Saraab | Khala Teje | PTV |
| 1990 | Stolen | Ayah | PTV |
| 1991 | Aahat | Doctor Sahiba | PTV |
| 1991 | Zeenat | Zeenat's mother | PTV |
| 1992 | Manzilein Aur bhi | Fehmida's mother | PTV |
| 1993 | Mera Nam Hai Muhabbat | Shama | PTV |
| 1994 | Rasm-e-Wafa | Jahanzeb's mother | PTV |
| 1995 | Chand Grehan | Mai Bhagaa | PTV |
| 1996 | Tum Meray Pass Raho | Nani | PTV |
| 1998 | Dhoop Mein Sawan | Rani | PTV |
| 2000 | Mera Muqadama Tum Laro Gay | Shamsa's mother | PTV |
| 2000 | Main Hu Na | Khala | PTV |
| 2000 | Zaib-un-Nisa | Rubina | PTV |
| 2000 | Mardangi Ka Taqaza | Jameel's mother | PTV |
| 2001 | Khala Kulsoom Ka Kumba | Mehmona | PTV |
| 2003 | Tum Hi To Ho | Jameela | PTV |
| 2004 | Janey Do | Chand's mother | PTV |
| 2006 | Tehrik-e-Niswan | Ahmed's mother | PTV |
| 2006 | Ramzan Mirza Section Officer | Anwari Begum | PTV |
| 2007 | Buri Aurat | Barkaten | Geo Entertainment |
| 2008 | Yeh Zindagi Hai | Kulsoom | Geo Entertainment |
| 2009 | Abhi Door Hai Kinara | Tameezni | PTV |
| 2012 | Mohabbat Jaye Bhar Mein | Zubeida's sister-in-law | Hum TV |
| 2012 | Dehleez | Rajjo | ARY Digital |
| 2012 | Quddusi Sahab Ki Bewah | Nunhi | ARY Digital |
| 2012 | Zard Mausam | Suriya | Hum TV |
| 2012 | Meri Saheli Meri Humjoli | Sabiha | Urdu 1 |
| 2013 | Pul Ke Uss Paar | Gul Rukh | Urdu 1 |
| 2013 | Rehaai | Ammi Jan | Hum TV |
| 2013 | Yeh Zindagi Hai Season 2 | Kulsoom | Geo Entertainment |

=== Telefilm ===
| Year | Title | Role |
|---|---|---|
| 1981 | Panah | Noor Bano |
| 1995 | Gul Phenke Hein | Aaya |
| 2013 | Lady Boxer | Muneer's mother |
| 2014 | Shadi Karogay | Ustani Ji |

=== Film ===
| Year | Title | Role |
|---|---|---|
| 1998 | Jinnah | Ayah |
