= Rehbra =

- Theatrical Poster
- Directed by: Amin Iqbal
- Written by: Assad Ali Shah; Shakeel Chohan
- Produced by: Saira Afzal
- Starring: Ahsan Khan; Ayesha Omer
- Release date: 24 June 2022
- Country: Pakistan
- Languages: Urdu, Punjabi

Rehbra is a 2022 Pakistani romantic comedy film, directed by Amin Iqbal and produced by Saira Afzal. The film stars Ahsan Khan and Ayesha Omer.

== Cast ==
- Ahsan Khan as Danish
- Ayesha Omer as Bubbly
- Sarish Khan
- Rimal Ali
- Saba Faisal
- Sohail Sameer
- Ghulam Mohiuddin

== Production ==
In 2017, Ahsan Khan stated that, "The film is almost done, it's 95% done." Khan and Omer resumed the shooting in January 2020. The principal shooting for the film was wrapped in September 2021.

== Release ==
The film has had its release date repeatedly postponed. It was first scheduled to release in 2020, but later got postponed. It was later released countrywide on 24 June 2022.

== See also ==
- Cinema of Pakistan
- Lollywood
