= Rubya Chaudhry =

Pakistani fashion model and actress

- Born: Rubya Chaudhry; Karachi, Pakistan
- Occupations: Actress; Supermodel; Comedian; Singer; Performer
- Years active: 2006 - present
- Partner: Umair Dar
- Modeling information
- Height: 5 ft 10 in (178 cm)
- Hair color: Dark Brown
- Eye color: Dark Brown

Rubya Chaudhry (born 21 December) is a Pakistani actress and fashion model. In 2006, she made her on-screen debut in the Pakistani cult classic slasher film, Zibahkhana. Since then, she has appeared in several Pakistani television shows, movies, and fashion shows.

== Model ==
Rubya Chaudhry was brought up in Karachi. She joined the fashion industry after completing her secondary education. Tall and slim, with a striking face, she was quickly successful. She has worked on the runway for major Pakistani designers, and in commercials and photoshoots for magazines. She has modeled for designers such as Arif Mahmood and Ayesha Hasan, and in shows such as Fashion Pakistan and Karachi Fashion. In an interview, she has said that fashion is as demanding as acting, saying "Fashion is about what you already possess and you refine what you have to work with. In acting, that's not so."

== Actress ==
Rubya Chaudhry has followed her step-mother as an actress in television plays and serials including 6 Degrees (Hum TV), Karachi-Aaj (RC T.V 3), Mission Karachi (Hum TV) and Love Marriage (Geo TV). She played "Inam-ul-Haq" in Mannchalay, a comedy TV drama serial that was televised on Hum TV. She also starred in the 2010 Hum TV teledrama Zindagi Main Kuch Life. Rubya Chaudhry starred as "Roxy" in the 2007 film Zibahkhana ("Hell's Ground"), called Pakistan's first splatter film, in which a group of teens meets a variety of bloodthirsty ghouls and zombies. The film has been described as a "gore-lover's paradise." However, despite the plot being basically a remake of The Texas Chain Saw Massacre, the movie is original in its setting, music and many details, and won international awards. Rubya Chaudhry was also in the cast of Siyaah, a Pakistani horror film that was released in 2013. Chaudhry also portrayed a greedy woman in ARY Digital telenovela Parchaiyan. She also plays a prominent role in Mohini Mansion Ki Cinderellayain on Bol Entertainment.
