= Sehra Teri Pyas =

2011 Pakistani television drama series

- صحرا تیری پیاس
- Genre: Drama
- Written by: Dr. Nasir Baloch
- Directed by: Sajjad Ahmad
- Starring: Sanam Baloch; Nirvaan Nadeem; Imran Arooj; Kamran Mujahid; Firdous Jamal; Farah Tufail; Jameel Fakhri; Affan Waheed; Humaira Ali
- Country of origin: Pakistan
- Original language: Urdu
- No. of episodes: 15

Production
- Producer: Khalid Rasheed

Original release
- Network: PTV Home
- Release: 30 August – 13 September 2011

Sehra Teri Pyas (صحرا تیری پیاس; transl. Thirst of the Desert) is a 2011 Pakistani television drama series written by Dr. Nasir Baloch, produced by Khalid Rasheed, and directed by Sajjad Ahmad. It was broadcast on PTV Home, running for 15 episodes from 30 August to 13 September 2011.

== Cast ==
- Sanam Baloch as Faiza Ali Shah
- Nirvaan Nadeem
- Imran Arooj
- Kamran Mujahid
- Firdous Jamal
- Farah Tufail
- Jameel Fakhri
- Affan Waheed
- Humaira Ali as Ameer Bibi

== Accolades ==
Year	Award	Category	Recipient	Result
2012	Lux Style Awards	Best Actress (Satellite)	Sanam Baloch	Won
