= Faryal Gohar =

Pakistani actress (born 1959)

- Born: Faryal Ali Gohar; 18 December 1959 (age 66); Lahore, Pakistan
- Education: Lahore American School; Kinnaird College for Women; McGill University; University of Southern California
- Occupations: Actress; Model; Television writer; Human rights activist; Writer
- Years active: 1975 – present
- Spouse(s): Irfan Jamil Rahman (m. 2002; died 2011) Jamal Shah (m. 1983; div. 1992)
- Children: 1
- Parent(s): Sayyid Gohar (father); Khadija Ali Gohar (mother)
- Relatives: Madeeha Gauhar (sister); Aamir Ali Gohar (brother); Nirvaan Nadeem (nephew); Savera Nadeem (niece); Sarang Nadeem (nephew); Shahid Nadeem (brother-in-law)

Faryal Gohar (born 18 December 1959) is a Pakistani actress, model, television writer and human rights activist. She is known for her roles in dramas Uraan, Chaandni Raatain, Chand Grehan, Wisal and Mohini Mansion Ki Cinderellayain.

== Early life ==
Faryal was born on 18 December 1959, in Lahore, Pakistan. She attended Lahore American School, she enjoyed playing sports and she played softball eventually she became the captain of softball in her school. Then she went to Kinnaird College for Women there she took part in sports. Later she went to Canada to study political economy and studied at McGill University. After graduating from McGill University, she moved to the United States and attended the University of Southern California in Los Angeles, where she studied documentary film.

== Career ==
Faryal made her debut as an actress on PTV in 1975 and she worked in drama Zanjeer. She worked as a model and was a popular model in 1970s. She appeared in drama Traffik with her husband Jamal Shah. Then she appeared in dramas Uraan, Chand Grehan and Chaandni Raatain.

In 1984, she established the Fine Arts Department at the University of Balochistan. She also appeared in telefilm Gul Phenke Hein as Jahanara Faryal joined Ajoka Theatre which was founded by her sister Madeeha and she did many theatre plays in the 1980s and the 1990s.

Faryal was appointed as UNFPA Goodwill Ambassador for the United Nations Population Fund in 1999.

In 1997 she appeared in the movie Zar Gul as Yasmin and in 2014 in the movie Tamanna as Madame Fatima. Then she appeared in drama Mohini Mansion Ki Cinderellayain as Daaro Maasi along with actress Shabnam and Qavi Khan.

In 2018 she was appointed as Goodwill Cancer Care Ambassador by Cancer Care Hospital & Research Center.

Faryal was appointed as Goodwill Softball Ambassador by Federation of Pakistan president Haider Khan Lehri in 2019.

== Personal life ==
Faryal married actor Jamal Shah and they were a power couple to audiences in Pakistan after they fell in love working together in cinema and art industry together for quite a long time but 9 years later they divorced. During her marriage to Jamal, she had conceived but developed complications in the pregnancy, leading to a miscarriage. In 2002, Faryal married Irfan Jamil Rahman, a Pakistani doctor in California in the United States, but he died from cancer in 2011. Faryal's elder sister actress Madeeha Gauhar died in 2018. Faryal is the aunt of actress Savera Nadeem and sister-in-law to screenwriter Shahid Nadeem.

== Filmography ==
=== Television ===
Year	Title	Role	Network
1975	Zanjeer	Maria	PTV
1988	Band Gali	Nida	PTV
1988	Kohkan	Zari	PTV
1989	Traffik	Romana	Channel 4
1989	Neelay Hath	Zarmeen	PTV
1992	Wisal	Zonia	PTV
1995	Chand Grehan	Gulbahar	PTV
1995	Uraan	Amira	PTV
2002	Chaandni Raatain	Abginey Aamir	PTV
2008	Brunch With Bushra Ansari	Herself	Geo News
2010	Saza Aur Jaza	Roshna	PTV
2018	Chakkar	Kishwar	BOL Entertainment
2018	Mohini Mansion Ki Cinderellayain	Daaro Maasi	BOL Entertainment

=== Telefilm ===
Year	Title	Role
1990	Gul Phenke Hein	Jahanara

=== Film ===
Year	Title	Role
1997	Zar Gul	Yasmin
2014	Tamanna	Madame Fatima

=== Music video ===
Year	Song	Singer(s)	Notes
2010	Koi Dil Mein	Rahat Fateh Ali Khan	Co-star Salman Shahid

== Philanthropy ==
In 1994, She participate in a fundraising event for the cancer hospital in Lahore, which was founded by Imran Khan. Faryal sold her house in Zaman Park and gave that money to the raising funds for the Shaukat Khanum Memorial Cancer Hospital.

== Ambassadorship ==
- UNFPA Goodwill Ambassador in 1999
- Ambassador for Cancer Care in 2018
- Pakistan softball Ambassador in 2019

== Awards and nominations ==
Year	Award	Category	Result	Title	Ref.
2003	2nd Lux Style Awards	Best Actress (TV)	Nominated	Chaandni Raatain	
2007	Patras Bokhari Awards	Best Novel Writer	Won	No Space for Further Burials	
2024	Roger Deakin Awards	Best Writer	Won	An Abundance of Wild Roses	
2025	Banff Mountain Book Competition	Best Novel	Won	An Abundance of Wild Roses	

== Bibliography ==
Faryal authored a critically novel titled The Scent of Wet Earth in August about exploration of desire and loss set in present day. Then she wrote another book titled No Space for Further Burials mentioning concerns about the socio-political situation for which she won Patras Bokhari Awards and the novel was translated in several European languages. In 2024 she wrote a novel titled An Abundance of Wild Roses about a lonely boy.
