= Ayesha Omar =

Pakistani actor, singer and model

- عائشہ عمر
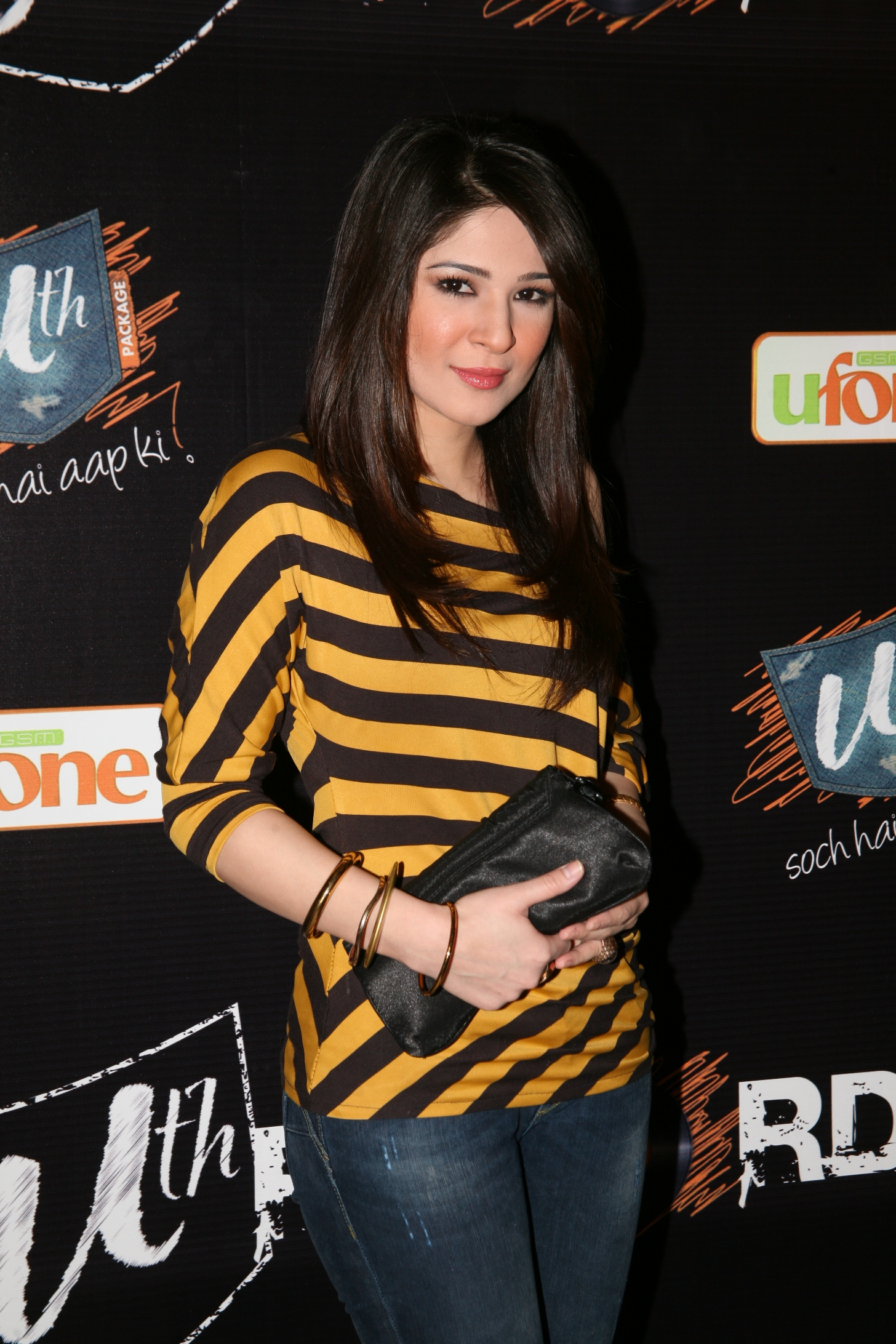
- Omar at an event for Ufone in 2011
- Born: 12 October 1981 (age 45); Lahore, Punjab, Pakistan
- Education: Lahore Grammar School
- Alma mater: National College of Arts
- Occupations: Actress; model; singer; painter
- Years active: 2000–present

Ayesha Omar (Urdu: عائشہ عمر; born 12 October 1981) is a Pakistani actress and occasional singer. Considered a style icon in her home country, Omar is one of the most popular and highest-paid actresses in Pakistan.

In 2012, she released her first singles "Chalte Chalte" and "Khamoshi" which, although a commercial success in Pakistan, was met with a mixed reaction from critics. Omar went on to win the Lux Style Award for Best Album. She made her film debut in the lead role with successful romantic-comedy Karachi Se Lahore in 2015, followed by supporting characters in war film Yalghaar (2017) and the drama Kaaf Kangana (2019).

== Early life and education ==
Omar was born in Lahore, Pakistan on 12 October 1981. She was one year old when her father died, so her mother raised Omar and her brother as a single parent. She described her childhood as "tough" and "independent". She attended Lahore Grammar School, and went to the National College of Arts for her Bachelors and Masters qualifications. While in school and college, she participated in co-curricular activities and learnt dance through theatre plays.

== Career ==
=== Modeling ===
Omar started her career as a model. She has done many commercials, including for Kurkure, Harpic, Capri, Pantene and Zong. Omar first hosted the show Meray Bachpan Kay Din on PTV at the age of eight. She then hosted Morning show Yeh Waqt Hai Mera on CNBC Pakistan, Rhythm on Prime TV and Hot chocolate on ARY Zauq. In 2018, she attended the New York Fashion Week as Pakistan's representative for the beauty brand Maybelline New York.

=== Acting ===
Omar made her acting debut with the serial College Jeans, which aired on PTV. Following this, she appeared in Geo TV's drama serial Dolly Ki Ayegi Baraat alongside veteran actors like Bushra Ansari, Saba Hameed and Jawed Sheikh. Since 2009, she has appeared on the popular sitcom Bulbulay as Khoobsurat, with actor Nabeel. Bulbulay become the most watched sitcom of Pakistan. Following the success of Bulbulay, Omar received strong media coverage and became a household name. Its second season currently airs on ARY Digital.

Omar then appeared in PTV serial Dil Ko Manana Aya Nahi opposite Amanat Ali, and Geo TV's drama serial Ladies Park alongside Humayun Saeed, Azfar Rehman, Hina Dilpazeer and Mahnoor Baloch.

In 2012, she was seen in Hum TV's highly successful romantic-drama serial Zindagi Gulzar Hai. She portrayed Sara, a girl with grey shades. In the serial, she played the role of on-screen sister of Fawad Khan. In an interview with The News International, she commented: "Fawad I’ve known since I was in college. We were part of the same underground music scene in Lahore – he was with EP and I was with my college band. We’ve spent some great times and practically grown up together. He was always very cute and very talented. But no, I can never think of him ‘that’ way and I didn’t mind playing his sister at all."

In 2013, she played the main antagonist called Arzoo in Tanhai on Hum TV. The show was a success.

She was also seen in Geo Kahani's serial Soha or Savera and Hum TV's serial Woh Chaar. Apart from television, she also performed item songs in Pakistani films Love Mein Ghum and Main Hoon Shahid Afridi, both of which were commercially successful.

After becoming an established actress through Pakistani television, Omar stepped into the film industry in the lead role of Wajahat Rauf's road drama film Karachi Se Lahore, in which she acted with Shehzad Sheikh. Upon release, the film received mixed reviews from critics. The Express Tribune criticized Omar's appearance in the movie and wrote: "There was barely anything for Ayesha Omar in the script, which is why her performance doesn't get noticed more than a girl wearing a revealing top, in a jeep flooded by guys. Even her item number Tutti Fruity was a touch jittery and certainly not worth the hype." Although Karachi Se Lahore was not critically well-received, it was a box office success, with a total earning of 10 Crore (US$1.0 million) worldwide.

Omar continued to act in television plays after signing few films, and made episodic appearances on Mr. Shamim and Kitni Girhain Baaki Hain 2.

Her next film release was Yalghaar in 2017, in which she played the character of Zarmina. Dawn.com describes her character as, "Her role, if any, is to grieve constantly and have Tor Jan whisper philosophical sayings into her ear. Yalghaar is among the most expensive Pakistani films ever made and the cost of waterproof makeup on Ayesha Omar's ashen face coupled with an endless cascade of fake tears, have surely contributed their share." Despite having an ensemble cast including Shaan, Humayun Saeed, Adnan Siddiqui among others, the film failed to garner a high score at box office, and collected around a total income of 200 million (US$1.9 million), which was called disappointing as compared to its big budget.

In 2018, Omar made a special appearance in the film Saat Din Mohabbat In with Sheheryar Munawar, which was released in June 2018. Speaking about the film in a press statement, Omar commented: "I said yes to the movie as soon as I read the script. I absolutely loved the concept of the movie as it is a complete entertainer with a pinch of both comedy and romance." The film was a box office success.

In 2019, she played a supporting character in the romantic-drama film Kaaf Kangana, directed by Khalil-ur-Rehman Qamar. Haiya Bokhari of Dawn.com noted, "Omar's character, though brief in its screen-time provides some relief, both aesthetically compared to odious styling featured in the rest of the film and in terms of acting and dialogue. Her natural effervescence shines through bringing some respite to sore eyes." The film emerged as a box office bomb.

=== Music ===
Omar first sang the song "Man Chala Hai" for her commercial Capri. She also sang the song "Bhooli Yaadon Mein", the title song of her serial Ladies Park and "Manjali", the title song of the Geo TV serial Manjali. She also sang the songs "Aoa" and "Tu Hi Hai".

In 2012, Omar released two albums "Chalte Chalte" and "Khamoshi" for which she won the Lux Style Award for Best Album. In 2013, she released her third album "Gimme Gimme". She also recorded an old classical song named "Laage Re Nain" and another fusion song "Miyan Ki Malhar" for Coke Studio Pakistan (Season 6) during the same year.

=== Painting ===
A Fine Arts graduate from NCA, she said that, even before acting and modelling, painting and singing were her first passions and career choices.

== Personal life ==
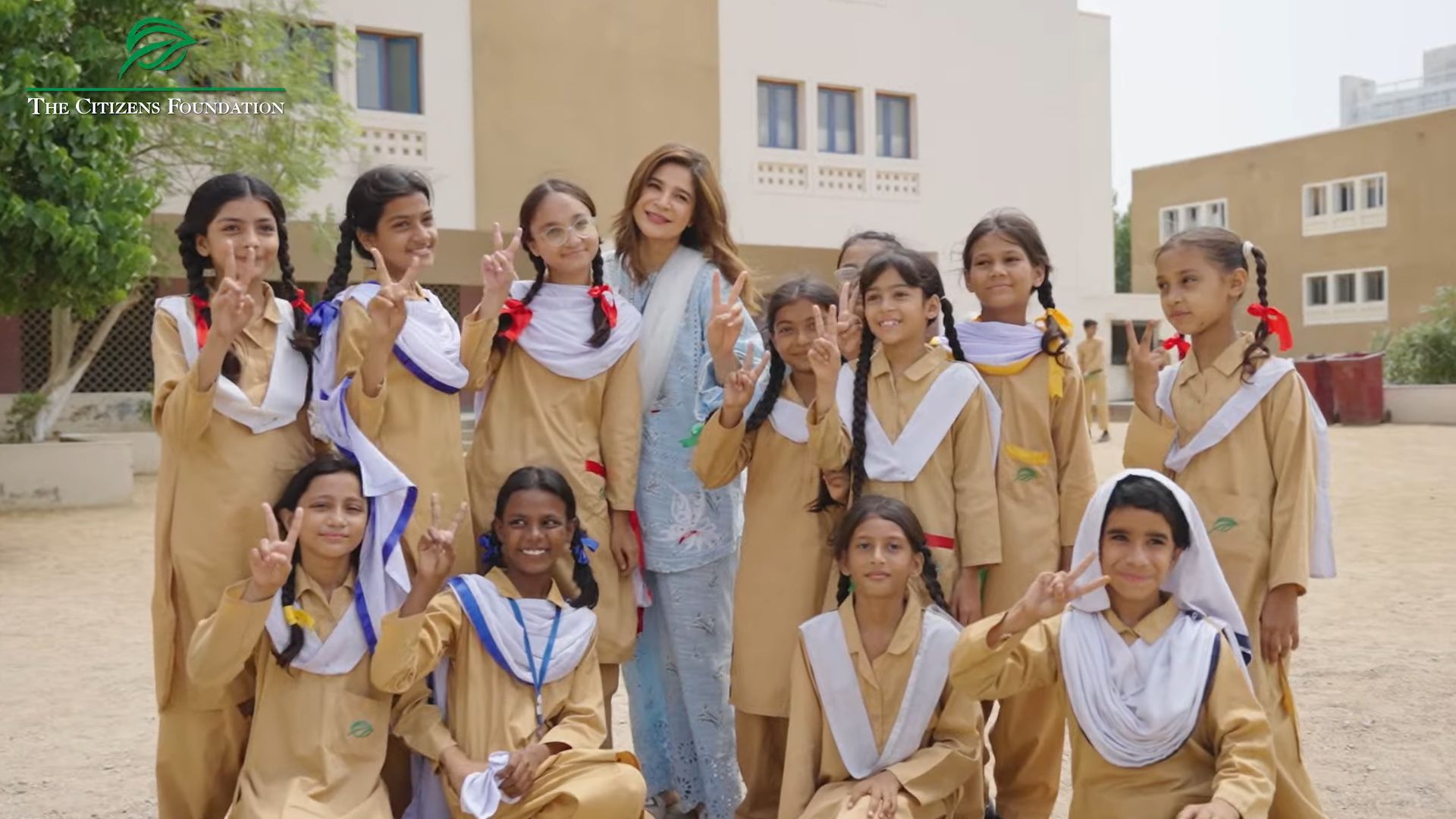
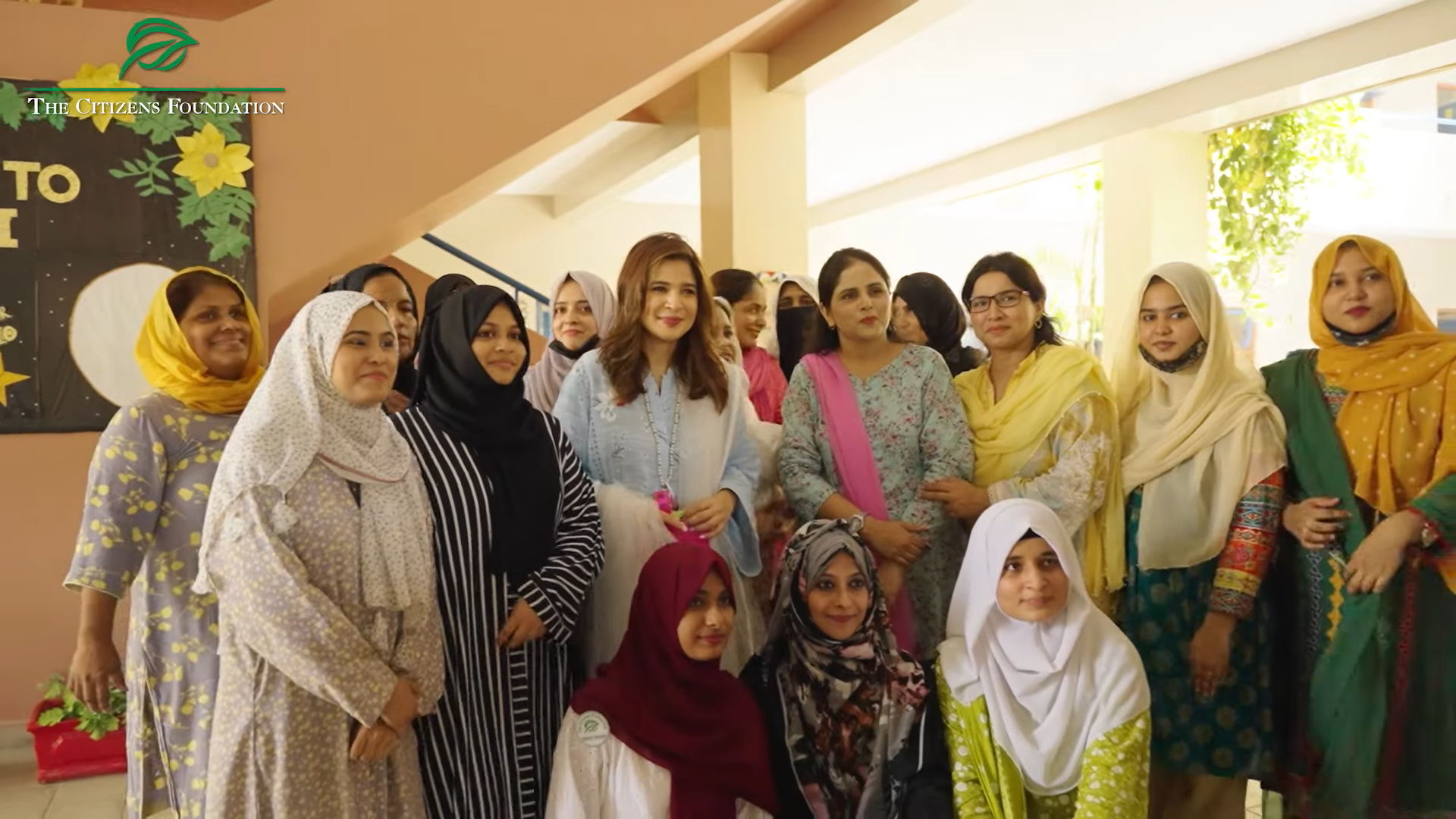
Ayesha Omar serves as the Goodwill ambassador for The Citizens Foundation.

In December 2015, Ayesha Omar and her co-star Azfar Rehman met with a road accident. The actors were reportedly travelling from Karachi to Hyderabad when the accident occurred. According to a source, another vehicle collided into their car, causing the car to swerve off the road and fall into a ditch. After recovering from her injuries, Omar said: "My entire life flashed in front of my eyes as I held onto my seat waiting to be hit by a truck."

In a 2020 interview with Ahsan Khan on his show Bol Nights with Ahsan Khan, Omar revealed that she has also been a victim of sexual harassment, stating: "I have been through harassment in my career and life, so I understand how it feels. I don’t have the courage to talk about it yet, maybe someday I will. But I can totally relate with everyone who has been through it."

She remains friends with her former boyfriend Sikander Rizvi.

== Filmography ==
Key
†	Denotes film/drama that has not released yet

=== Film ===
Year	Film	Role	Notes
2011	Love Mein Ghum	Herself	Special appearance in song "Love Mein Ghum"
2013	Main Hoon Shahid Afridi	Herself	Special appearance in song "Beautiful Night"
2015	Karachi Se Lahore	Maryam	Also playback singer for "Tutti Fruiti"
2017	Yalghaar	Zarmina	
2018	7 Din Mohabbat In	Tipu's unnamed partner	Special appearance
2019	Kaaf Kangana	Gulnaz	
2022	Rehbra	Bubbly	
2023	Money Back Guarantee	Meena Begum	
2023	Huey Tum Ajnabi	Ayesha	
2023	Kukri	Zara	
2023	Dhai Chaal	Kanwal	
2024	Taxali Gate	Muskaan	Also producer
2026	Mera Lyari	Behnaz Baloch	Also executive producer

=== Television ===
Year	Serial	Role	Notes
2000	Kollege Jeans	Sabahat	
2001	Kaun (Psycho Thriller)	Sania	Appeared in Episode 2 & 6
2006	Kuch Lamhe Zindagi Kay	Mishi	
2006	Muthi Bhar Aasman		
2009–2017, 2018	Bulbulay	Khoobsurat	ARY Digital, then on BOL Entertainment
2009	Meri Zaat Zarra-e-Benishan	Herself	Special appearance
2010	Dolly Ki Ayegi Baraat	Sila	
2011	Ladies Park	Natasha	
2012	Dil Ko Manana Aya Nahi	Noor	
2012	Woh Chaar	Meher	
2012	Zindagi Gulzar Hai	Sara	
2013	Tanhai	Arzoo	Negative Role
2014	Soha Aur Savera	Soha	
2014	Meri Guriya	Qurat-ul-Ain	Telefilm
2015	Mr. Shamim	Sidra Niazi	
2015	Miss You Kabhi Kabhi	Noor Hassan	
2016	Mera Dard Bayzuba	Soha	
2016	Kitni Girhain Baaki Hain 2	Sara	Episode 2
2019	Phir Bulbulay	Khoobsurat	
2019–present	Bulbulay (season 2)	Khoobsurat	
2021	Bisaat	Sofia	
2022	Habs	Soha	Negative Role
2022–present	Selahaddin Eyyubi	Not known	

=== Reality shows ===
Year	Serial	Role	Network
2002–2003	Meray Bachpan Kay Din	Host	PTV
2005–2006	Rhythm	Host	Prime TV
2010–2011	Yeh Waqt Hai Mera	Host	CNBC Pakistan
2012–2012	Hot Chocolate	Host	ARY Zauq
2016	Battle of the Bands	Host	Various
2025–	Lazwaal Ishq	Host	YouTube

== Discography ==
Year	Song	Notes
2010	"Man Chala Hai"	Song for commercial Capri
2010	"Aoa"	Music Video
2010	"Tu Hi Hai"	Music Video
2011	"Bhooli Yaadon Mein"	Theme song of serial Ladies Park
2011	"Manjali"	Theme song of serial Manjali
2011	"Ye Kya Hua"	Theme song of serial Uraan
2012	"Chalte Chalte"	Music Video
2012	"Khamoshi"	Video Album; Lux Style Award for Best Album
2013	"Gimme Gimme"	Music Video
2013	"Laage Re Nain"	Sung at Coke Studio Pakistan (Season 6)
2013	"Miyan Ki Malhaar"	Sung at Coke Studio Pakistan (Season 6)
2015	"Tutti Fruiti"	Sung for the film Karachi se Lahore

== Awards and nominations ==
Year	Nominee / work	Award	Result	Ref
Lux Style Awards
2008	Kaisa Yeh Junoon	Best Television Actress (Satellite)	Nominated	
2013	Khamoshi	Best Album of the Year	Won	
ARY Film Awards
2016	Karachi Se Lahore	ARY Film Award for Best Actress	Nominated	
2016	Karachi Se Lahore	ARY Film Award for Best Star Debut Female	Won	
International Pakistan Prestige Awards
2017	Style Icon of the Year Female		Won	

== See also ==
- List of Pakistani actresses
