= Mazhar Moin =

Pakistani television director

Mazhar Moin is a Pakistani television director who has worked in a number of genres, often exploring themes of the lower-middle class, disability, and marginalized communities with social commentary. He has been described as a "new wave" director, because of his departure from the melodramatic portrayals of wealthy characters prevalent in Pakistani television, by focusing on low-middle class stories. Moin has worked with a range of sensitive subjects such as homosexuality and transgender issues, as well as the concerns and experiences of minorities and marginalized communities in Karachi, such as Christians and Hindus.

== Career ==
=== Quddusi Sahab Ki Bewah ===
Quddusi Sahab Ki Bewah is based on the tele-film "Raunaq Jehan ka Nafsiyati Gharana" by Moin and Fasih Bari Khan. It is a social commentary on the middle class and lower middle classes, their changing social spaces, and their engagement with the traditional models of culture and language.

The 'sharif' (respectable) but lower middle-class family headed by Shakooran, the Bewah (widow) of Quddusi Sahab, lives as an illegal occupant of the downstairs portion of their landlord's house. The Bihari landlord Aleemuddin's family lives upstairs and consists of his 2 wives, a son and daughter, and his "Pashto, Urdu and wannabe-English-speaking" daughter-in-law, Rooh Afza.

It is language and the social conflicts between the two households that drives the various plots in the drama.

Hina Dilpazir plays multiple characters - Shakooran, Badraka Jahan, Rooh Afza, Bengali baji, Nazima Khatoon (Aleemuddin's sister), Nazeer Khan (the ill-mannered street rat), Tina Gul (Rooh Afza's mother), Elaichi (the transgender servant) and Tamizini.

=== Sirf Tum ===
The 2023 serial Sirf Tum is a love story of two cousins Hannan (played by Hamza Sohail) and Abeer (played by Anmol Baloch). It was criticized for 2 scenes; the first for the depiction of drinking alcohol and the second relating to a bedroom scene.

=== Meem Kahani ===
The Meem Kahani channel on YouTube is where Moin's short-form and more controversial content is released. This consists of a number of short plays, up to 18 minutes in length, and allows for the exploration of "taboo subjects" that the Pakistani regulators would not allow on television.

=== Professional collaborations ===
His oldest artistic partnership is with writer Fasih Bari Khan, with whom he has worked on numerous projects, including "Quddusi Sahab Ki Bewah", "Burns Road Ki Nilofer", "Saraye Ghat Ki Farzana", "Faltu Larki", "Behkawa" and "Kitna Satatay Ho". Fasih Bari Khan is known for his exploration of social issues, and their collaborations often explore these themes with a blend of comedy and realism. Khan explains that "Mazhar and l are childhood friends. Our projects are born over a random cup of tea". Moin has directed many of Bari's screenplays, to critical approval, with Burns Road ki Nilofer being described in 2012 as a "zenith of their collaboration".

Hina Dilpazeer is an character actress who has worked with Moin in "Quddusi Sahab Ki Bewah" and "Burns Road Ki Nilofer". Dilpazeer's versatility and comedic talents have combined successfully with Moin's style. She gained recognition for portraying more than 12 different characters in Moin's directed play "Quddusi Sahab Ki Bewah", where she also contributed to costume and make-up design.

Moin has established a strong professional relationship with the production house 7th Sky Entertainment, led by Abdullah Kadwani and Asad Qureshi. He has directed several commercially successful series under their banner, including "Dil Awaiz" "Shahrukh Ki Saliyan," "Bajjo," "Nisa," and "Thori Sazish Thori Mudakhlat". Moin has said that working with 7th Sky Entertainment allowed him to "work openly".

== Filmography ==
| Title | Year | Notes |
| Burns Road Ki Nilofer | 2006/2008 | Comedy-drama |
| Raunaq Jehan ka Nafsiyati Gharana | 2010 | Comedy/Drama |
| Behkawa | 2012 | LGBT life |
| Quddusi Sahab Ki Bewah | 2012-2014 | Black comedy |
| Mithu Aur Aapa | 2014 | Comedy |
| Aik Aur Aurat | 2010 | Drama |
| Taare Ankaboot | 2014 | Drama |
| Kitna Satatay Ho | 2015 | Romantic drama |
| Chhappar Phaar Kay | 2016 | Family drama |
| Iss Khamoshi Ka Matlab | 2016 | Family/Romantic drama |
| Faltu Larki | 2016 | Family drama |
| Iltija | 2017 | Drama about disability |
| Piyari Bittu | 2017-2018 | Family drama about Alzheimer's |
| Haiwan | 2018 | Social awareness drama about child abuse |
| Shahrukh Ki Saliyan | 2019-2020 | Romantic comedy |
| Meherposh | 2020 | Romantic drama |
| Dour | 2021 | Drama |
| Romantic Razia | 2021 | Romantic comedy telefilm |
| Dil Awaiz | 2022 | Drama |
| Kanpain Tang Rahi Hain | 2022 | Comedy telefilm |
| Plum Cake | 2023 | LGBTQ+ short film/Drama |
| Bahar Nagar | 2025 | Light entertainment |
