= Hina Dilpazeer =

Pakistani actress, comedian and host

- حنا دلپذیر
- Born: Hina Dilpazeer Khan; 16 January 1969 (age 57); Karachi, Sindh, Pakistan
- Occupations: Actress, television presenter
- Years active: 2006–present
- Spouse: Ahmed Ali (m. 1989; div. 1992)
- Children: 1

Hina Dilpazeer Khan (Urdu: حنا دلپذیر) is a Pakistani actress and television presenter. Known for her comic roles, she is widely regarded as one of the most popular comedians and actresses in Pakistan.

Dilpazeer rose to prominence for playing leading comic roles in the television series Annie Ki Ayegi Baraat (2012), Mohabbat Jaye Bhar Mein (2012) and Mithu Aur Aapa (2012). She garnered international recognition with the family sitcom Bulbulay (2009–present) and for playing more than 40 characters in the cult classic black comedy series Quddusi Sahab Ki Bewah (2012–2014).

Dilpazeer's films include supporting roles in the comedy drama 7 Din Mohabbat In (2018) and the romantic comedy Parey Hut Love (2019). The latter ranks among the highest-grossing Pakistani films.

== Early life ==
Dilpazeer was born to a Pakistani family in Karachi, Pakistan. After completing her early education in Karachi, her family moved to UAE because of her father's employment. After spending some years in Dubai, Dilpazeer returned to Karachi in 2006.

== Career ==
While Dilpazeer was in UAE, she pursued a radio career. She wrote and performed radio plays. After returning to Pakistan, she started her career in 2006 in the Pakistani TV industry by obtaining the role of Saeeda in Burns Road Ki Nilofar, a telefilm directed by Mazhar Moin and broadcast by ARY Digital. The critics and the public highly appreciated her acting in Burns Road Ki Nilofar.

Dilpazeer loves theater work very much and has performed in several theatre plays with one being the National Academy of Performing Arts' Dil Ka Kya Rang Karoon. Dilpazeer made her first professional screen debut in Fasih Bari Khan's telefilm Burns Road Ki Neelofar in 2008, for which she received the 2009 Kara Film Festival Award for Best Supporting Actress. She then appeared in several television films and series, including the Geo TV drama Tum Ho Ke Chup (2011), which further earned her critical appraisal, and the cult classic comedy drama Quddusi Sahab Ki Bewa (2012), in which she played more than forty different main and supporting characters, through which she garnered appraisal and proved herself as one of the finest actors in the industry.

Dilpazeer's performance in the sitcom Bulbulay as Momo has created a cult following, which led her to international acclaim and recognition. She received her first Lux Style Award nomination as Best TV Actress – Satellite for her performance in Tum Ho Ke Chup. She further gained critical acclaim with a comedy character in Mohabbat Jaye Bhar Mein (2012) where she played a middle-class housewife, that earned her the title of "most versatile" actor of recent times, and her second Lux Style Award nomination as Best TV Actress – Satellite. Dilpazeer's other noted projects are Ladies Park (2011), Annie Ki Ayegi Baraat (2012) and Mithu Aur Aapa (2014).

== Personal life ==
In her family, Dilpazeer states she was closest to her father. She remembers him as her "friend" and credits him for many of her qualities. Besides being involved in television and theatre, Dilpazeer enjoys poetry and music and adores Roshan Ara Begum, Bade Ghulam Ali Khan, Master Madan, and Begum Akhtar.

Dilpazeer married Ahmed Ali in 1989 in a love marriage. They have a son, Mustafa Ali, who was born the same year. The marriage ended in 1992, with Hina stating that Ahmed divorced her in anger. At the time of the divorce, Dilpazeer was 23 years old and her son was 3 years old.

== Filmography ==
=== Film ===
Year	Title	Role	Notes
2016	Jeewan Hathi	Natasha	
2017	Shaan-e-Ishq	Mehwish's mother	
2018	7 Din Mohabbat In	Tipu's mother	
2018	The Donkey King	Miss Fitna	Animated film (voice role)
2019	Parey Hut Love	Farida	
2023	Money Back Guarantee	Sahiba Begum	
2025	Chaa Jaa Re	Shagufta	Filming

=== Television ===
==== Actress ====
Year	Title	Role	Notes	Ref(s)
2006	Burns Road Ki Nilofer	Saeeda	Telefilm	
2008	Yeh Zindagi Hai	Hajira		
2008	Mehman	Surraiyya		
2009	Noorpur Ki Rani	Bano		
2009	Nadaaniyaan	Chef Rahat		
2009–2016	Bulbulay	Mumtaz (Momo)		
2009	Andata			
2009	Veena			
2010	Ronaq Jahan Ka Nafsiyati Gharana		Telefilm	
2010	Rang		Telefilm	
2011	Ladies Park	Kulsoom		
2011	Tum Ho Ke Chup	Saazein Bibi		
2012	Annie Ki Ayegi Baraat	Bilo Farry Dharallah		
2012–2014	Quddusi Sahab Ki Bewah	Various		
2012	Mohabbat Jaye Bhar Mein	Nasreen, Neeli's Mother		
2012	Fun Khana	Kausar		
2012	Jahez	Badar-un-Nisa "Baddo"		
2013	Taar-e-Ankaboot			
2014	Mithu Aur Aapa	Mitthu		
2014	Siray Ghat Ki farzana			
2015	Googly Mohalla	Naheed	2015 World Cup special	
2015	Khatoon Manzil			
2016	Iss Khamoshi Ka Matlab	Sundas's mother in law		
2016	Hina Dilpazir Ki Gudgudee	Dolly Phuppo	Telefilm	
2016	Jab Tak Ishq Nahi Hota	Fazeelat		
2016	Faltu Larki	Syeda Raskha Bano		
2016	Kitni Girhain Baaki Hain (season 2)	Shamma/Barrister Maasi	Episode 8	
2016–2017	Hum Sub Ajeeb Se Hain	Behtreen		
2018	Lollipop			
2018	Hum Chale Aaye	Farzana		
2018–2019	Baandi	Faiza		
2018–2019	Siskiyan			
2019	Choti Choti Batain	Akaash's mother	Story 2	
2019	Phir Bulbulay	Mumtaz (Momo)		
2019	Jhanka Tanki		Telefilm	
2019	Bulbulay (season 2)	Mumtaz / Momo		
2019	Gul-e-Rana Ki Bhawajain	Gul-e-Rana	Telefilm	
2020	Shokhiyaan	Gauri		
2020	Bhabi Nazar Laga Dengi	Saima	Telefilm	
2021	Laddu Ki Lady	Rakshi's mother	Telefilm	
2021	Foreign Love Affair	Saira	Telefilm	
2021	Dil Ke Chor	Ansa	Telefilm	
2021	Tameez Uddin Ki Badtameez Family	Bilqees	Telefilm	
2021	Romantic Razia		Telefilm	
2022	Made For China	Mrs. Fazeelat	Telefilm	
2022	Thori Sazish Thori Mudakhlat	Dolly	Telefilm	
2025	Bahar Nagar	Bahar Begum		

==== Presenter ====
Year	Serial	Role	Channel
2015–2016	Dilpazeer Show	Host	ARY Digital

==== Director ====
Year	Serial	Channel
2016	Hina Dilpazir Ki Gudgudee	TVOne Global

== Awards and nominations ==
Year	Award	Nominated work	Category	Result
2008	Kara Film Festival	Burns Road Ki Nilofar	Best Female Actor in a Supporting Role	Won
2012	Lux Style Awards	Tum Ho Ke Chup	Satellite Best TV Actress	Nominated
2012	Hum Awards	Mohabbat Jaye Bhar Mein	Hum Award for Best Supporting Actress	Nominated
2013	Lux Style Awards	Quddusi Sahab Ki Bewah	Satellite Best TV Actress	Nominated
2019	Hum Awards	Baandi	Hum Award for Most Impactful Character	Nominated
