= Zar Gul =

Pakistani film

- زر گل
- Directed by: Salmaan Peerzada
- Written by: Salmaan Peerzada
- Produced by: Usman Peerzada
- Starring: Imraan Peerzada; Faryal Gohar; Samina Peerzada; Talat Hussain
- Music by: Roger White
- Distributed by: Peer Films
- Release date: 1997
- Running time: 120 minutes
- Country: Pakistan
- Language: Urdu

Zar Gul (Urdu: زر گل, lit. 'Golden Rose') is a 1997 Pakistani film directed and written by Salmaan Peerzada and produced by Usman Peerzada.

== Plot ==
The story revolves around a young boy who later becomes an outlaw and dacoit, but remains a hero to the poor, after his father is killed by a crooked politician.

== Cast ==
- Imraan Peerzada as Zar Gul
  - Babar Peerzada as Young Zar Gul
- Faryal Gohar as Yasmin
- Mehmood Siddiqui as Nawab
- Samina Peerzada as Nawab's wife
- Talat Hussain as Zahid
- Steve Masty as Jack
- Jamil Malik as Yar Badshah
- Salmaan Ali as Salman

== Production ==
Zar Gul was filmed in Pakistan and United Kingdom. It was presented by Peer Films and it was written also directed by Salmaan Peerzada. The film was released in three different languages in Pastho, Punjabi and English with subtitles. The film was also screened at FiLUMS International Film festival.

== Music ==
The background music and music scenes were composed by Roger White.
