= Talat Hussain (actor) =

Pakistani actor (1942–2024)

Talat Hussain PP SI
- طلعت حسین
- Born: Talat Hussain Warsi; 18 September 1942; Delhi, British India
- Died: 26 May 2024 (aged 81); Karachi, Sindh, Pakistan
- Education: London Academy of Music and Dramatic Art
- Occupations: Actor; Radio host Teacher
- Years active: 1962–2024
- Children: 3
- Awards: Sitara-i-Imtiaz (2021); Pride of Performance (1982)

Talat Hussain Warsi (18 September 1942 – 26 May 2024) was a Pakistani actor and radio host.

The son of Shaista Begum, who was one of the pioneering voices of Radio Pakistan, he was called "the Pakistani Laurence Olivier" for his versatility and his later role as mentor to other actors.

== Early life and education ==
Talat Hussain was born in Delhi, British India on 18 September 1942, his parents moving to Karachi soon after the partition, where his mother Shaista Begum joined Radio Pakistan as a broadcaster. His father was a civil servant.

He earned his Bachelor of Arts degree from Islamia College and in 1972 he enrolled in the London Academy of Music and Dramatic Arts.

== Career ==
=== 1960s-1970s: Early work in radio and cinema ===
One of his first movies was Chiragh Jalta Raha (1962), where he played a supporting role, now considered a classic, and in 1967 he joined Radio Pakistan as a voiceover artist.

He then shared the screen with some important names of Pakistan's cinema, such as Waheed Murad in Ishara (1969) or Mohammad Ali in Insaan Aur Admi (1970).

=== 1970s-1980s: Rise to prominence through television ===
In the 1970s and the 1980s the country witnessed the rise of PTV television serials, Talat Hussain playing lead roles in popular serials such as Bandish (1976).

=== 1990s-2010s: Mature character roles ===
In the later part of his career he used to play character roles marked by maturity, like in Kashkol (1993).

=== International productions ===
Talat Hussain worked in several foreign films, television drama serials and long plays, including the Turkish movie Malkoçolu Ölüm Fedaileri (1971), Channel Four's television serials Traffik (1989) and Family Pride (1991). In 2006, Hussain won the Amanda Award for the Best Supporting Role in the Norwegian film Import-Eksport (2005). He also appeared in the Indian film Souten Ki Beti (1989) and made a guest appearance in Jinnah (1998).

== Other work ==
=== Acting teacher ===
As of 2012, he was a faculty member at the National Academy of Performing Arts (NAPA) in Karachi where he taught acting.

He was also the director of the Arts Council of Pakistan Karachi's theatre department.

=== Literature ===
He wrote short stories, including Sanduq and Taza Bastiyan that have been theatrically enacted by his students, and was working on novels at the time of his death.

He also composed prose poetry.

=== Qur'anic narration ===
In the 1980s he recorded a narration of a translation of the Qur'an in Urdu, which remains popular.

== Personal life ==
Hussain was married to Rakhshanda Hussain, a professor of psychology at the University of Karachi. They had three children, two daughters and one son: Tazeen, the eldest daughter, was a television actress before quitting after her wedding, while younger daughter Roohaina, has a few television plays to her credit.

== Illness and death ==
In February 2012, Talat Hussain revealed that he had caught a skin allergy in 2010, which developed complications due to incorrect treatment by a local cosmetologist. He said "I couldn't even talk properly, let alone walk or sit after the treatment."

Hussain died in Karachi on 26 May 2024, at the age of 81.

== Legacy and tributes ==
Talat Hussain's career was recorded by the author Huma Mir in the book Yeh Hain Talat Hussain. In 2014, tributes were paid to him at an event at the Arts Council of Pakistan, Karachi, by many television personalities, including playwright Haseena Moin, veteran TV actor/playwright of Alif Noon (1982) fame; Kamal Ahmed Rizvi; journalist Mazhar Abbas; and veteran TV actor Qazi Wajid.

== Selected filmography ==
=== Television serials ===
Year	Title	Role	Director	Channel	Notes	Ref
1976	Parchaiyan	Shiraz		PTV		
1976	Bandish	Shahzad		PTV		
1976	Gangsters	Detox Doctor		BBC	English production, 2 episodes	
1979	Typist	Safdar Ali		PTV		
1980	Rabta	Tahir		PTV		
1980	Waiting Room	Kamal Akmal		PTV		
1982	Sarab	Shahid		PTV		
1985	Karawaan	Tofeeq Ahmed		PTV		
1989	Traffik	Drug lord Tariq Butt		Channel 4	English production	
1990	Kareem Sahab Ka Ghar	Kareem		PTV		
1993	Kashkol	Fazal Jah		NTM		
1994	Umedon Ke Saye	No	Yes	PTV		
1997	Hawain	Meer Muhammad		PTV		
1999	Pindar	No	Yes	PTV		
2000	Aansoo	Doctor Ahsan		PTV		
2000	Sath Sath Ya Alag Alag	No	Yes	PTV		
2001	Doordesh	Raja		PTV		
2002	Des Pardes	Malik Nasir		PTV		
2002	Thori Khushi Thora Ghum	Shamsheer		PTV		
2002	The Castle: Aik Umeed	Fawad Ali Syed		PTV		
2004	Meharun Nisa	Yousuf		Indus TV/ Zee TV		
2004	Ana	Agha Jalal Khan		ARY Digital		
2005	Riyasat	Qadir Jogi		ARY Digital		
2011	Dolly Aunty Ka Dream Villa	Malik Nazeer		Geo TV		
2016	Mann Mayal	Rehman		Hum TV		
2019	Damsa	Sohail		ARY Digital		
2023	Na Tumhain Khabar Na Humien Khabar	Mansoor		Aan TV		

=== Films ===
- Chiragh Jalta Raha (1962)
- Ishara (1969 - written, produced and directed by Waheed Murad)
- Insan aur Aadmi (1970)
- Malkoçoğlu Ölüm Fedaileri (1971, Turkish-Iranian-Pakistani co-production film)
- Mohabbat Mar Nahi Sakti (1977)
- Bandagi (1972)
- Qurbani (1981 film)
- Gumnaam (1983)
- Kamyabi (1984)
- Halchal (1985)
- Ek Say Barh Kar Ek (1987)
- Sautan Ki Beti (Indian film)
- Raja Sahab (1996)
- Zar Gul (1997)
- Jinnah - The Movie (1998)
- Laaj (2003)
- Import-Eksport (2005 Norwegian film)
- Actor in Law (2016)
- Chupan Chupai (2017)
- Project Ghazi (2017)

=== Stage ===
- Andhera Ujala
- Raz o Niaz
- Guriya Ghar
- Lao Tau Qatalnama Mera
- Sufaid Khoon
- Khalid Ki Khala
- Jo Chalay To Jaan Sey Guzar Gayey

== Awards and nominations ==
- Pride of Performance Award (1982).
- Best Actor Gumnan, National Film Awards (1985).
- Nigar Award in 1986 for Best Supporting Actor in film Miss Bangkok (1986)
- Amanda Award (2006) Best Supporting Actor in Norwegian film – Import Eksport (2005).
- The 1st Indus Drama Awards (2005) Nominee: Best Actor Drama Series in a Leading Role.
- Sitara-i-Imtiaz (Star of Excellence) Award by the President of Pakistan in 2021.

=== Lux Style Awards ===
Ceremony	Category	Project	Result	Ref(s).
3rd Lux Style Awards	Best Film Actor	Laaj	Nominated	
4th Lux Style Awards	Best TV Actor (Satellite)	Ana	Nominated	
5th Lux Style Awards	Best TV Actor (Satellite)	Yeh Bhi Kisi Ki Bayti Hai	Won	
5th Lux Style Awards	Best TV Actor (Satellite)	Riyasat	Nominated	
8th Lux Style Awards	Best TV Actor (Terrestrial)	Kabhi Aye Na Judai	Won	

== See also ==
- National Academy of Performing Arts
- List of Lollywood actors
