= Fasih Bari Khan =

Pakistani television and filmwriter

- Born: Karachi, Sindh, Pakistan
- Occupation: Screenwriter
- Writing career
- Language: Urdu

Fasih Bari Khan (Urdu: فصیح باری خان) is a television scriptwriter from Pakistan. Khan is generally known for the bold portrayals of social issues in his writings. He has also written scripts for Lollywood films and is best known for 7 Din Mohabbat In (2018). In Pakistan television industry he received critical praise for the blockbuster drama Quddusi Sahab Ki Bewah.

== Career ==
Khan has written several highly acclaimed yet controversial TV plays for different networks. He first rose to fame with the acclaimed Burns Road Ki Nilofer. He is best known for Quddusi Sahab Ki Bewah which ran for 140 episodes His stories are reflective of everyday lives of the inner cities of Pakistan and highlight ills of society that are often viewed as controversial. It was the case for the supernatural series Taar-e-Ankaboot (2013), which touched on many taboo and bold subjects such as prostitution, sexuality and black magic. His plays come across as a slice of life, offered up without the garnishing of pretence. Most of them were staged by Mazhar Moin, a childhood friend of his.

In late 2021, Khan made his directional debut with short film Dafa Ho Jao Tum starring Resham and Abdullah Ejaz.

== Work ==
=== Films ===
- 7 Din Mohabbat In
- Jeewan Hathi

=== Drama serials ===
- Behkawa
- Quddusi Sahab Ki Bewah
- Mohabbat Jaye Bhar Mein
- Mithu Aur Aapa
- Kitna Satatay Ho
- Faltu Larki
- Mohini Mansion Ki Cinderellayain
- Ghisi Piti Mohabbat

=== Telefilms ===
- Burns Road Ki Niloufer
- Pichaal Pariyaan

=== Web series ===
- Chintoo Ki Mummy
