= Quddusi Sahab Ki Bewah =

Pakistani comedy drama television series 2012–2014

- Genre: Black comedy
- Written by: Fasi Bari Khan
- Directed by: Mazhar Moin
- Creative director: Nauman Qamar
- Starring: Hina Dilpazeer; Shehnaz Pervaiz; Uroosa Siddiqui; Badar Khalil; Waqar Hussain; Ubaida Ansari; Mirza Shahi; Maqsood Hassan; Najiba Faiz; Sangeeta
- Country of origin: Pakistan
- Original language: Urdu
- No. of episodes: 155

Production
- Executive producer: Kamran S.A Khan
- Producers: Khalid Ali; Nadeem Nawaz
- Production location: Pakistan
- Running time: 35-45 min (1 hour with intervals)
- Production company: Crew Entertainment

Original release
- Network: ARY Digital
- Release: 12 February 2012 – 25 June 2014

Quddusi Sahab Ki Bewah (Urdu: قدوسی صاحب کی بیوہ, lit. 'Mr. Quddusi's Widow') is a Pakistani black comedy television series which premiered in 2012 on ARY Digital. The series became popular soon after its initial telecast due to the storyline, authentic humour and Hina Dilpazeer's acting in multiple roles, portraying more than 40 characters. It is the follow-up television series of telefilms written by Fasih Bari Khan and directed by Mazhar Moin.

The film has developed a cult following over the years. The lexicon of the series has become part of everyday and ordinary language.

== Plot ==
It is a story of two families living in upper and lower floors of a house. The householder Aleem ud-Din lives upstairs with his family, his wife Nunhi, a divorced daughter Bhunarya, a son Maqsood and daughter-in-law Rooh Afzaa. While, Quddusi's widow Shakooran lives downstairs as a tenant with her three daughters, Khajusta Jahan, Badraka Jahan, Shagufta Jahan and a son Abdul Wudood Ahmad. Aqeela Bhabhi is also a major character who is a neighbour and a good friend of Shakooran. Both families later shift to a new house owned by Shakooran when Shagufta Jahan is married to Aleem ud-Din. Aqeela is kicked out of her home by her sons and lives with Shakooran, who makes her do all the housework.

== Cast and characters ==
Actor name	Character name	First episode appearance	Total episode appearances	Notes
Main character
Hina Dilpazeer	Shakooran	Episode 1	155	Quddusi Sahab's widow of Dehlavi heritage and occupant of Aleemuddin's house, hypocritical and highly boastful with a tendency to use old Urdu idioms
Hina Dilpazeer	Badreeqa Jahan	Episode 1	120	Second daughter of Quddusi Sahab, headmistress of a public school who often quotes Urdu poetry and old novels
Hina Dilpazeer	Rooh Afza	Episode 1	155	Aleemuddin's self-obsessed and self-proclaimed 'glamorous' daughter in law who possesses a big superiority complex and peppers her speech with English phrases
Shehnaz Pervaiz	Khajista Jahan	Episode 1	148	Eldest daughter of Quddusi Sahab, homeopathic doctor who is obsessed with men and finding a husband to marry
Uroosa Siddiqui	Shagufta Jahan	Episode 1	137	Third daughter and youngest child of Quddusi Sahab and later Aleemuddin's second wife before getting divorced, initially constantly laughs through any situation before becoming a strict dictator over Aleemuddin and his family after her marriage, then descends into mental illness after her divorce
Waqar Hussain	Wadood Ahmed	Episode 1	149	Only son of Quddusi Sahab, highly effeminate and obsessed with fashion, dancing, and make up, best friends with Rooh Afzah
Mirza Shahi	Aleemuddin Sahab	Episode 2	120	Landlord of Shakooran, perverted old man who harasses every woman around him before eventually marrying Shagufta (after initially getting into a relationship with Khajista), later wants to get married a third time
Ubaida Ansari	Nanhi	Episode 1	117	Maqsood and Bhunarya's mother and Aleemuddin's first wife, extremely frugal and averse to bathing and cleanliness
Maqsood Hassan	Maqsood	Episode 1	109	Short-heighted husband of Rooh Afza, constantly has extra-marital affairs despite being extremely fearful of Rooh Afza's wrath
Badar Khalil	Aqeela Bhabhi	Episode 1	140	Shakooran's friend and neighbor, she later starts living with Shakooran and her family when her sons kick her out for her dubious behaviour, always tries to steal things and seduce men to get her way
Supporting character
Hina Dilpazeer	Bengali Baji	Episode 4	15	Voodoo and black magic specialist from Bangladesh
Hina Dilpazeer	Nazima Khatoon	Episode 11	69	Aleemuddin's elder sister, always schemes to get Aleemuddin's property whilst trying to get rid of his wife and children
Hina Dilpazeer	Nazeer Dilbarjaani	Episode 20	89	Second love interest of Badreeqa and later Shagufta, con man and mechanic who tries to charm every woman he can to get money despite having a wife and a teenage daughter (who later get involved in his schemes)
Hina Dilpazeer	Tina Gul	Episode 33	44	Rooh Afza's mother, upper class gold-digger who is constantly gambling or drinking away with her rich friends or getting remarried to rich old man
Hina Dilpazeer	Elaichi	Episode 48	18	Trans woman in the vicinity of Shakooran's house, has familiar relations with both Durdana and Farhat Arra and gets involved in both's schemes
Hina Dilpazeer	Tameezni Bua	Episode 62	5	Unhygienic lady for surveillance of Kahjista when Shakooran and family goes to Murree
Hina Dilpazeer	Mursaleen Mian	Episode 63	6	Accountant at guest house in Murree but pretends to be blind and owner of guest house
Hina Dilpazeer	Simi	Episode 63	4	Mursaleen Mian's mentally unwell young daughter
Hina Dilpazeer	Shaheena Phurki	Episode 86	12	Police inspector, Rooh Afza's friend
Anees Alam	Basheer	Episode 2	38	Love interest of Badreeqa Jahan, later married her, however divorced shortly after their marriage and started dating Khajista subsequently
Hira Sheikh	Bhunarya	Episode 10	111	Daughter of Aleemuddin and Nanhi, gets divorced and starts living with them, dumb and unhygienic yet constantly dotes on Wadood
Sajal Aly	Farzana	Episode 35	20	Love interest of Wadood
Asma Abbas	Durdana	Episode 35	20	Farzana's greedy mother
Rehana Kaleem	Shahida Beauty Parlor Wali	Episode 38	23	beautician having affair with Maqsood
Sameera Hassan	Ruqqaiya Darjeelingwala	Episode 43	5	Tina Gul's friend and Nazeer's madam
Rashid Farooqui	Bhunnu	Episode 75	51	Nazima Khatoon's son
Sangeeta	Farhat Arra	Episode 76	25	widow and neighbor in Shakooran's vicinity
Fazila Lashari	Shafiqa	Episode 76	24	Farhat Arra's daughter
Sarah Razi	Afifa	Episode 76	26	Farhat Arra's daughter
Minal Khan	Aneesa	Episode 76	26	Farhat Arra's daughter
Anum Aqeel	Shabbo	Episode 79	3	Aleemuddin's fiancé for third marriage
Irfan Khoosat	Molvi Sahab	Episode 79	9	Aqeela's love interest
Raza Zaidi	Rauf	Episode 81	10	Afifa's boyfriend
Hina Rizvi	Rizwana	Episode 110	22	Nazeer's wife who is a nurse and joins him in his schemes
Komal Iqbal	Popi	Episode 110	26	Nazeer and Rizwana daughter who has many boyfriends and joins her parents in their exploits
Haddy Firdousi	Azam Kalti	Episode 110	6	Thug, Popi's boyfriend and later husband
Daniyal Afzal Khan	Waheed	Episode 110	2	Popi's friend
Shabbir Rana	Dilip Kumar	Episode 124	4	Rooh Afza's maternal grandfather, Shakooran's crush
Unknown	Chakram Uncle	Episode 121	4	Basheer's uncle suggested by him for Halala with Khajista
Minor character
Nasreen John	Farhat Aapa	Episode 1	3	Family Planning doctor and Shagufta's colleague
Nuzhat Fakhar	Nasreen	Episode 3	1	Co-worker of Khajista at Homeopathic clinic
Hina Dilpazeer	Khala	Episode 29	2	fraudster and bandit from Korangi, disguised as Madhu Chopra
Hina Dilpazeer	Mong Phali Aapa	Episode 72	1	Magistrate registrar who solemnizes Khajista and Basheer
Hina Dilpazeer	Herself	Episode 93	2	
Sonya Hussyn	Shehnaaz Akhtar	Episode 29	2	fraudster and bandit from Korangi, disguised as Priyanka Chopra
Najiba Faiz	Zareena	Episode 29	2	fraudster and bandit from Malir, disguised as Kareena Kapoor
Urooj Abbas	Bagga Sahab	Episode 46	2	casting director at local advertising model agency
Urooj Abbas	Jaan-e-Alam	Episode 56	4	Shagufta's driver and love interest of Bhunarya
Urooj Abbas	Khursheed	Episode 76	1	smuggler and father of girl for whom Wadood's marriage proposal was suggested
Urooj Abbas	Kallan	Episode 77	3	butcher and Bhunarya's friend
Shahid Khwaja	Saleem Mainpuri	Episode 101	1	reporter on a news channel
Mathira	Herself	Episode 118	2	Shakooran's family wins a chance to host Mathira on Eid so she visits the family to celebrate Eid with them

Role	Portrayed by
Fraud Aunty	Hina Dilpazeer
Nida TV Host (Eid Special Episode)	Hina Dilpazeer
Morning Show Host (1 episode)	Hina Dilpazeer

== Production ==
=== Filming ===
The principal shooting of the serial took place in Karachi. Whereas for some episodes, shooting also took place at Murree.

== Reception ==
The series received critical acclaim due to its humour, storyline and Dilpazir's performance. Her performance in almost 40 characters (including the titular characters, supporting characters and some recurring characters) earned her praise from critics as well as the audience.

== Accolades ==
Year	Awards	Category	Recipient(s)/ nominee(s)	Result	Ref.
2013	Lux Style Awards	Best TV Actress - Satellite	Hina Dilpazir	Nominated	
