= Deewanay Do =

Pakistani film

- دیوانے دو
- Directed by: Nazar-ul-Islam
- Written by: Shoki & Asghar
- Produced by: Nazar-ul-Islam
- Starring: Nadeem; Babra Sharif; Bindiya
- Music by: M. Ashraf
- Distributed by: Shaheen Ginza Combined Productions
- Release date: 27 August 1985
- Running time: 150 minutes
- Country: Pakistan
- Language: Urdu

Deewanay Do (Urdu: دیوانے دو, lit. 'Let's Go Crazy') is a 1985 Pakistani film it was written by Shoki & Asghar and directed and produced by Nazar-ul-Islam. It stars Nadeem, Babra Sharif and Bindiya in leading roles.

== Plot ==
The story is about a rich boy Mansoor (Nadeem) and later he meets Saira (Babra) who is from a well good family. They both meet during an accident but they both falls in love and decides to get married but Mansoor's father (Agha) is against the marriage while his mother (Bahar) supports him but later gives up due to her husband's pressure. Then Katie comes from Prais with her father. Katie (Bindiya) begins to like Mansoor and their parents likes it and believes they are a perfect couple and arranges a marriage so they could be together.

== Cast ==
- Nadeem as Mansoor
- Babra Sharif as Saira
- Bindiya as Katie
- Sabiha Khanum as Saira's mother
- Bahar Begum as Sabia
- Agha Talish as Daud

== Music ==
All lyrics are written by Tasleem Fazli & Khawaja Pervaiz; all music is composed by M. Ashraf.

Deewanay Do
No.	Title	Singer (s)	Length
1.	"Aa Pal Do Pal Kuchh Baat Karayn"	Mehdi Hassan	3:50
2.	"Bach Bach Kay Main Kahan Jaoon Ga"	Akhlaq Ahmed	4:00
3.	"Bheegi Bheegi Barsaat Aaei"	A. Nayyar	4:50
4.	"Chori Chori Miltey Rehna"	Ghulam Abbas & Mehnaz Begum	3:50
5.	"Ju Pyar Mohabbat Kartey Hayn"	Mehnaz Begum & Ghulam Abbas	4:30
6.	"O Sathi Ray Pyar Karien Gayy"	A. Nayyar & Mehnaz Begum	4:40

== Reception ==
The film was released on 27 August 1985, and it was a Golden Jubliee hit at the box office.
