= Robin Ghosh discography =

Robin Ghosh (1939–2016) was a Bangladeshi-descent Pakistani film score composer. He scored music for 47 films in Urdu and Bengali. The following is a complete list of the films he composed:

== 1960s ==
Year	Film	Language	Country	Notes
1960	Rajdhanir Buke	Bengali	Pakistan	
1962	Chanda	Urdu	Pakistan	
1962	Notun Sur	Bengali	Pakistan	
1963	Talash	Urdu/Bengali (bilingual)	Pakistan	Winner: Nigar Award for Best Music Director
1964	Paisay	Urdu	Pakistan	
1964	Karwan	Urdu	Pakistan	
1964	Bandhan	Urdu	Pakistan	
1966	Begana	Urdu	Pakistan	
1966	Bhayya	Urdu	Pakistan	
1967	Chakori	Urdu/Bengali (bilingual)	Pakistan	Winner: Nigar Award for Best Music Director
1968	Tum Meray Ho	Urdu	Pakistan	
1968	Jahan Tum Wahan Hum	Urdu	Pakistan	
1969	Daag	Urdu	Pakistan	

== 1970s ==
Year	Film	Language	Country	Notes
1970	Pitch Dhala Poth	Bengali	Pakistan	
1971	Nacher Putul	Bengali	Pakistan	
1972	Ehsaas	Urdu	Pakistan	
1974	Bhool	Urdu	Pakistan	
1974	Chahat	Urdu	Pakistan	Winner: Nigar Award for Best Music Director
1974	Miss Happy	Urdu	Pakistan	
1974	Sharafat	Urdu	Pakistan	
1975	Do Sathi	Urdu	Pakistan	
1975	Umang	Urdu	Pakistan	
1974	Anokhi	Urdu	Pakistan	
1974	Jeeo Aur Jeene Do	Urdu	Pakistan	
1974	Mom Ki Guriya	Urdu	Pakistan	
1977	Aina	Urdu	Pakistan	Winner: Nigar Award for Best Music Director
1978	Amber	Urdu	Pakistan	
1978	Anmol Mohabbat	Urdu	Pakistan	

== 1980s ==
Year	Film	Language	Country	Notes
1980	Bandish	Urdu	Pakistan	Winner: Nigar Award for Best Music Director
1980	Nahin Abhi Nahin	Urdu	Pakistan	
1980	Shesh Uttar	Bengali	Bangladesh	his first Bangladeshi film after its independence
1981	Kiran Aur Kali	Urdu	Pakistan	
1982	Aahat	Urdu	Pakistan	
1983	Do Bheegey Badan	Urdu	Pakistan	
1984	Doorian	Urdu	Pakistan	Winner: Nigar Award for Best Music Director
1985	Hum Aur Tum	Urdu	Pakistan	
1987	Julie	Bengali	Bangladesh	
1987	Love in Nepal	Urdu	Pakistan	
1988	Sheesh Nagin	Urdu	Pakistan	

== 1990-present ==
Year	Film	Language	Country	Notes
1993	Khwahish	Urdu	Pakistan	
1993	Ranjish	Urdu	Pakistan	composed along with Alauddin Ali
1995	Jo Dar Gaya Woh Mar Gaya	Urdu	Pakistan	
1996	Ghoonghat	Urdu	Pakistan	
1998	Wedding	Urdu	Pakistan	
2001	Badmash Gujjar	Urdu	Pakistan	
2016	Salute	Urdu	Pakistan	

== Unreleased ==
Film	Language	Country	Notes
Pyaas	Urdu	Pakistan	

== Background Score Only ==
Year	Film	Composer	Language	Country	Notes
1988	Jogajog	Alauddin Ali	Bengali	Bangladesh	
