= Nadeem filmography =

Nadeem has acted in over 200 Pakistani films from his debut film Chakori (1967), and his hit films such as Diya Aur Toofan (1969), and Aina (1977) to modern superhits such as Main Hoon Shahid Afridi (2013). The following is a list of the films he has been a part of as an actor or director.

== Filmography ==
Year	Title	Role	Note
1967	Chakori	Anwer/Anu	
1967	Chote Saheb		
1968	Behan Bhai		
1968	Chand Aur Chandni		
1968	Main Kahan Manzil Kahan		
1968	Padosi		
1968	Quli		
1968	Sangdil		
1968	Tum Mere Ho		
1969	Anari		
1969	Aneela		
1969	Daag	Arshad	
1969	Diya Aur Toofan		
1969	Fasana-e-dil		
1969	Nanzeen		
1970	Baazi		
1970	Chand Suraj		
1970	Jaie Na Kyun Parwana		
1970	Saughat		
1970	Shama Aur Parwana		
1971	Aansoo		
1971	Chiragh Kahan Roshni Kahan		
1971	Jalte Soraj ke Neeche		
1971	Parai Aag		
1972	Pazaib		
1972	Angarey		
1972	Suhag		
1972	Ehsaas		
1973	Nadaan		
1973	Daman Aur Chingari		
1974	Mitti Ke Putlay		
1974	Dillagi		
1974	Bahisht		
1974	Do Tasweerain		
1975	Pehchan	Janu	
1975	Zeenat	Waqar	
1975	Anari		
1975	Roshni	Jahangir	
1976	Daman Ki Aag		
1977	Aina		
1977	Ishq Ishq		
1978	Playboy		
1978	Zindagi		
1979	Pakeeza		
1980	Bandish		
1981	Mutthi Bhar Chawal		
1982	Sangdil		
1982	Aahat		
1982	Aangan		
1983	Gehri Chot - AKA: Door Desh	Tony	Pakistan-India joint venture film
1983	Dehleez		
1983	Deewangi		
1984	Yeh Kaise Hua		
1984	Kamyabi	Tariq	
1985	Hero		
1985	Yaadon Ki Kasam		
1985	Naraz		
1986	Talaash		
1987	Badla		
1988	Mukhra		
1988	Bazar-e-Husn		
1989	Taqat Ka Toofan		
1990	Bulandi		
1990	Insaniyat Kay Dushman		
1990	Aasmaan		
1991	Watan Kay Rakhwalay		
1991	Zid		
1991	Aandhi		
1992	Abdullah the Great		
1992	Shehzada		
1992	Mehbooba		
1992	Chahat		
1993	Anhoni		
1993	Khuda Ghawah		
1993	Qasam		
1993	Kotwal		
1993	Khandan		
1994	International Luteray		
1994	Zameen Aasman		
1994	Khazana		
1995	Jeeva		
1995	Madam Rani	Dr. Baig	
1995	Jungle Ka Qanoon		
1995	Mushkil		
1995	Sargam		
1995	Jo Darr Gya Woh Marr Gya		
1996	Mummy		
1996	Hawain		
1997	Umar Mukhtar		
1997	Deewaney Terey Pyaar Key		
1997	Aulad Ki Kasam		
1998	Muhafiz		
1998	Dupatta Jal Raha Hai		
1999	Inteha		
2000	Billi		
2005	Kyun Tum Say Itna Pyar Hai		
2005	Koi Tujh Sa Kahan	Sir Romeo	
2006	Pehla Pehla Pyar		
2006	Tarap		
2007	Mein Ek Din Laut Kay Aaoon Ga	Dr. Azim	
2008	Khulay Asmaan Kay Neechay		
2011	Love Mein Gum	Dr. Kanwal	
2011	Bhai Log	Abba Bhai	
2013	Main Hoon Shahid Afridi	Imam Deen	
2014	The System	Pesh Imam	
2016	Hijrat		
2016	Sikander		
2018	Azaadi	Azaad's father	
2019	Parey Hut Love	Faisal	
2019	Superstar	Agha Jaan	
2020	Zarrar	Mejor General Mujtaba	
