= Sharafat (1974 film) =

1974 Pakistani Urdu film

- شرافت
- Directed by: Nazar-ul-Islam
- Screenplay by: Bashir Niaz
- Produced by: Sheikh Abdul Wahid & Sheikh Abdul Shakoor
- Starring: Nadeem; Shabnum; Qavi; Allaudin; Nayyar Sultana; Lehri; Sofia Bano; Nanha; Munawar Saeed; Seema
- Cinematography: Afzal Chaudhary
- Edited by: Irshad Durrani
- Music by: Robin Ghosh
- Production company: Teenie Productions
- Release date: 9 August 1974
- Country: Pakistan
- Language: Urdu

Sharafat is a 1974 Pakistani Urdu film produced By Sheikh Abdul Wahid & Sheikh Abdul Shakoor, directed by Nazar-ul-Islam and written by Bashir Niaz. Under the supervision of "Teenie Productions" ۔The lead cast included Nadeem, Shabnum, and Qavi. The music of the film was composed by Robin Ghosh and one of the playback tracks, "Teray Bheegay Badan Ki Khushboo Se" became an all-time hit. Sharafat received 4 Nigar Awards in various categories of filmmaking.

== Synopsis ==
A poor woman dies because her only son is unable to provide her with the treatment she needs to survive. The son turns into a white-shirt thief and later falls in love with a fallen girl.

== Cast ==
- Nadeem
- Shabnam
- Qavi
- Allaudin
- Nayyar Sultana
- Lehri
- Sofia Bano
- Masood Akhtar
- Nanha
- Munawar Saeed
- Saqi
- Seema
- Ibrahim Nafees
- Kamal Irani

== Music and soundtracks ==
The music of Sharafat was composed by Robin Ghosh and the songs were penned by Kaleem Usmani:

Song	Singer
Ik Saya Roz Nikalta Hai	Rubina Badar
Teray Bheegay Badan Ki Khushboo Se	Mehdi Hassan
Hay Mere Sang Challa Ek Khubsurat Saathi	Akhlaq Ahmed, Nayyara Noor

== Awards ==
Sharafat won 4 Nigar Awards for the following categories:

Category	Awardee
Best director	Nazar-ul-Islam
Best cinematographer	Afzal Chaudhary
Best film editor	Irshad Durrani
Best male playback singer	Mehdi Hassan
