= Mumtaz (Pakistani actress) =

Pakistani actress (born 1952)

- ممتاز
- Born: Riffat Qazalbash; 7 October 1952 (age 73); Karachi, Sindh, Pakistan
- Occupations: Actress; model; dancer
- Years active: 1971 - present
- Spouse: Bari Malik (divorced)
- Children: 3
- Awards: Won 5 Nigar Awards during her film career

Mumtaz (born 1952) is a Pakistani film actress who worked in Urdu and Punjabi movies during the 1970s, 1980s and 1990s. She is known for her lead roles in the movies Pyaar Ka Mausam (1975), Mohabbat Zindagi Hai (1975), Jab Jab Phool Khile (1975), and Amber (1978). She won 5 Nigar Awards in her long cinema career.

== Early life ==
Mumtaz was born as Riffat Qazalbash in 1952 in Karachi. Mumtaz's father Amir-ul-Hassan Qazalbash, was a resident of Agra. After Partition of India in 1947, he migrated to Pakistan and moved to Karachi. Before appearing in Lollywood films, she was quite popular for dancing at various functions and social events in Karachi.

== Career ==
Mumtaz came to films in 1971. Her first film was Dil Aur Dunya and her second film, Ehsaas (1972) was directed by Nazar-ul-Islam and produced by Ilyas Rashidi. Along with Shabnam and Nadeem in the lead cast, Mumtaz had a small role in the film. She again played a small role in Shahid and Rani's film Umrao Jaan Aada. Meanwhile, she had given a dance performance in a Punjabi film, Banarsi Thug (1973), to a song sung by Noor Jehan, with the lyrics Ankh Lari Badu Badi, Mouqa Miley Kadi Kadi. The song was filmed in a bar. This sensational song was a huge super hit and made Mumtaz famous overnight. After Banarasi Thug, Mumtaz's social film Sidha Raasta, starring Naghma, Yousuf Khan, and Sultan Rahi, became a diamond jubilee and Mumtaz became the center of attention for film fans across Pakistan.

Mumtaz's first lead role film was Intezaar which was released in 1974. The film starred Mumtaz alongside Shabnam, Nadeem, Babra Sharif, and Mohammad Qavi. The heroine of this film was Shabnam, but the entire story of this film revolves around Mumtaz. In this film, Mumtaz was portrayed as a very modern girl. This film became a silver jubilee in Karachi. Just two weeks after the release of this film, Mumtaz's other film Shikaar was released, in which she appeared as a full heroine. In this film, Mumtaz played the role of a dumb girl against the hero Shahid, who was portrayed as a savage wild man. After the release of this film, Mumtaz dominated Pakistan's film industry and she became a busy actress. Her film Dushman, which was released at the end of 1974, also became a golden jubilee hit. The director of this film was Pervez Malik. In this film, Mumtaz played a lead role along with Waheed Murad and Muhammad Ali.

Dancing was the central attraction in Mumtaz's screen performances. In the movie Mohabbat Zindagi Hai, singer Nahid Akhtar's playback song "Tut Turu Tara Tara" was pictured on Mumtaz. She was much applauded for her dancing performance for that song.

Later, Mumtaz worked in several successful movies like Pyaar Ka Maasam (1975), Mohabbat Zindagi Hai (1975), Jab Jab Phool Khile (1975), Sheeshay Ka Ghar (1978), and Amber (1978). Her last film, Ghail, was released in 1997.

After a break of almost 25 years following her marriage, Mumtaz returned to Pakistan from Canada and resumed acting in films. Later, she transitioned to television.

In 2025, she made a comeback in films and appeared in film Welcome to Punjab which was released on 14 August 2025 and her role was praised.

== Personal life ==
Reportedly, Mumtaz was in a relationship with film producer Chaudhry Ajmal during the late 1970s, though they were never married. She was married to film studio owner Bari Malik for a short period. She had a son, Zeeshan Raheel Bari, with him before they separated in the early 1980s.

Later, she married a Pakistani businessman and moved to Canada. As of 2025, she lives in Canada with her family.

== Filmography ==
=== Television ===
| Year | Title | Role | Network |
|---|---|---|---|
| 2023 | Star & Style Season 4 | Herself | PTV |

=== Film ===
Mumtaz acted in 202 Urdu and Punjabi films:

| Year | Film | Language |
|---|---|---|
| 1971 | Dil Aur Dunya | Urdu |
| 1972 | Ehsaas | Urdu |
| 1972 | Umrao Jaan Ada | Urdu |
| 1973 | Mr. 420 | Punjabi |
| 1973 | Ziddi | Punjabi |
| 1973 | Yaar, Pyar Tay Maa | Punjabi |
| 1973 | Banarsi Thug | Punjabi |
| 1973 | Rangeela Ashiq | Punjabi |
| 1973 | Rangeela Aur Munawar Zarif | Urdu |
| 1973 | Farz | Urdu |
| 1974 | Tum Salamat Raho | Urdu |
| 1974 | Sidha Rasta | Punjabi |
| 1974 | Naukar Wohti Da Diamond jubilee film | Punjabi |
| 1974 | Badmash Puttar | Punjabi |
| 1974 | Shikar | Urdu |
| 1974 | Qatil | Punjabi |
| 1974 | Intezar | Urdu |
| 1974 | Bhool (Golden jubilee film) | Urdu |
| 1974 | Dushman | Urdu |
| 1974 | Deedar | Urdu |
| 1974 | Jadoo | Punjabi |
| 1975 | Saajan Rang Rangeela | Urdu |
| 1975 | Haar Geya Insan | Urdu |
| 1975 | Pyar Ka Mousam | Urdu |
| 1975 | Mohabbat Zindagi Hai | Urdu |
| 1975 | Sharif Badmash | Punjabi |
| 1975 | Soorat Aur Seerat | Urdu |
| 1975 | Guddi | Punjabi |
| 1975 | Shararat | Urdu |
| 1975 | Roshni | Urdu |
| 1975 | Jab Jab Phool Khile | Urdu |
| 1975 | Shoukan Melay Di | Punjabi |
| 1976 | Talash (Diamond jubilee film) | Urdu |
| 1976 | Koshish | Urdu |
| 1976 | Sohni Mehinval | Punjabi |
| 1976 | Kharidar | Urdu |
| 1976 | Pathar Tay Moti | Punjabi |
| 1976 | Akh Lari Bado Badi | Punjabi |
| 1976 | Ann Daata | Urdu |
| 1976 | Reshma Tay Shera | Punjabi |
| 1976 | Gama B.A. | Punjabi |
| 1976 | Geo Aur Jeenay Do | Urdu |
| 1976 | Jahangira | Punjabi |
| 1977 | Aavara | Urdu |
| 1977 | Parastish | Urdu |
| 1977 | Jasoos | Urdu |
| 1977 | Jabroo | Punjabi |
| 1977 | BeGunah | Punjabi |
| 1977 | Jeenay Ki Rah | Urdu |
| 1977 | Shaheen | Urdu |
| 1977 | Apnay Huay Paraey | Urdu |
| 1978 | Amber | Urdu |
| 1978 | Aag Aur Zindagi | Urdu |
| 1978 | Sharmili | Urdu |
| 1978 | Sheeshay Ka Ghar | Urdu |
| 1978 | Kall Day Munday | Punjabi |
| 1978 | Haider Ali | Urdu |
| 1978 | Dushman Ki Talash | Urdu / Pashto |
| 1979 | Qasm Khoon Di | Punjabi |
| 1979 | Yahan Say Vahan Tak | Urdu |
| 1979 | Tehka Pehlvan | Punjabi |
| 1979 | Remand | Punjabi |
| 1979 | Raja Ki Aye Gi Baraat | Urdu |
| 1979 | 2 Rastay | Urdu |
| 1979 | Attal Faisala | Punjabi |
| 1979 | Jeenay Ki Saza | Urdu |
| 1979 | Ziddi Jatt | Punjabi |
| 1979 | Dangal | Punjabi |
| 1979 | Khana Jangi | Punjabi |
| 1979 | Nizam Daku | Punjabi |
| 1979 | Khushboo | Urdu |
| 1979 | Dubai Chalo | Punjabi |
| 1979 | Qatil Tay Farishta | Punjabi |
| 1980 | Ik Wohti 3 Lahray | Punjabi |
| 1980 | Iqrar | Pashto |
| 1980 | Vadda Thanedar | Punjabi |
| 1980 | Baraan | Pashto |
| 1980 | 2 Nishan | Punjabi |
| 1980 | Sohra Tay Jawai | Punjabi |
| 1981 | Khabara Da Izzat Da | Pashto |
| 1981 | Mr. Aflatoon | Punjabi |
| 1981 | Gunman | Urdu |
| 1981 | Meray Apnay | Urdu |
| 1981 | Fatafat | Punjabi |
| 1981 | Parvah Nein | Punjabi |
| 1981 | Kufr-o-Islam | Pashto |
| 1981 | Sala Sahib | Punjabi |
| 1981 | Sher Khan | Punjabi |
| 1981 | Sangram | Urdu |
| 1981 | Dara Sikandar | Punjabi |
| 1981 | Veryam | Punjabi |
| 1981 | Chann Suraj | Punjabi |
| 1981 | Maula Jatt Tay Noori Natt | Punjabi |
| 1981 | Rustam | Punjabi |
| 1981 | Posti | Punjabi |
| 1981 | Ghazab | Pashto |
| 1981 | Sultan Tay Veryam | Punjabi |
| 1982 | Black Warrant | Urdu |
| 1982 | Bharia Mela | Punjabi |
| 1982 | Raja Sahib | Urdu |
| 1982 | Sangsar | Punjabi |
| 1982 | 2 Bhiga Zamin | Punjabi |
| 1982 | Noukar Tay Malik | Punjabi |
| 1982 | Haidar Sultan | Punjabi |
| 1982 | Ik Nikah Hor Sahi | Punjabi |
| 1982 | Shaan | Punjabi |
| 1982 | Bivian Hey Bivian | Urdu |
| 1982 | Wohti Jee | Punjabi |
| 1982 | Zara Si Baat | Urdu |
| 1982 | Charhda Suraj | Punjabi |
| 1982 | Visa Dubai Da | Punjabi |
| 1982 | Ik Ziddi Veer | Punjabi |
| 1982 | Wohti Da Sawal A | Punjabi |
| 1983 | Jatt Tay Dogar | Punjabi |
| 1983 | 2 Ziddi | Punjabi |
| 1983 | Bau Ji | Punjabi |
| 1983 | Aakhri Muqabila | Punjabi |
| 1983 | Moti Tay Dogar | Punjabi |
| 1983 | Dillan day Souday | Punjabi |
| 1983 | Susral Chalo | Punjabi |
| 1983 | Raka | Punjabi |
| 1983 | Murad Khan | Punjabi |
| 1983 | Samundar Par | Punjabi |
| 1983 | Toofan Tay Toofan | Punjabi |
| 1983 | Heera Pathar | Punjabi |
| 1983 | Sher Mama | Punjabi |
| 1984 | Namak Halal | Punjabi |
| 1984 | Hathan Vich Hath | Punjabi |
| 1984 | Ishq Samundar | Punjabi |
| 1984 | Kalia | Punjabi |
| 1984 | Muqaddar Ka Sikandar | Urdu |
| 1984 | Iman Tay Farangi | Punjabi |
| 1984 | Haibat Khan | Punjabi |
| 1984 | Ishq Pecha | Punjabi |
| 1984 | Bala Gaadi | Punjabi |
| 1984 | Baghi | Punjabi |
| 1984 | Khanu Dada | Punjabi |
| 1984 | Andher Nagri | Punjabi |
| 1984 | Taavan | Punjabi |
| 1984 | Pukar | Punjabi |
| 1985 | Hero | Urdu |
| 1985 | Dhee Rani | Punjabi |
| 1985 | Pukhay Bateray | Punjabi |
| 1985 | Halaku Tay Khan | Punjabi |
| 1985 | Jani Dushman | Punjabi |
| 1986 | Mama Saray Shehar Da | Punjabi |
| 1986 | Baghi Sipahi | Punjabi |
| 1986 | Zanjeer | Urdu |
| 1986 | Griftari | Punjabi |
| 1986 | Chann Tay Soorma | Punjabi |
| 1986 | Jitt Qanoon Di | Punjabi |
| 1986 | Charhda Toofan | Punjabi |
| 1986 | Qatil Ki Talash | Urdu |
| 1986 | Agg Day Darya | Punjabi |
| 1986 | Suhagan | Punjabi |
| 1986 | Balocha Tay Daku | Punjabi |
| 1987 | Sangal | Punjabi |
| 1987 | Moti Sher | Punjabi |
| 1987 | Kala Toofan | Punjabi |
| 1987 | Jabar Khan | Punjabi |
| 1987 | Kundan | Urdu |
| 1987 | Rajput | Punjabi |
| 1987 | Chann Mahi | Punjabi |
| 1987 | Babul Veer | Punjabi |
| 1987 | Mera Insaf | Urdu |
| 1988 | Pyar Tera Mera | Punjabi |
| 1988 | Farz-o-Qanoon | Pashto |
| 1988 | Mafroor | Punjabi |
| 1988 | Taqatvar | Punjabi |
| 1988 | Baghi Haseena | Urdu |
| 1988 | Mundri | Punjabi |
| 1988 | Sheru Tay Sultan | Punjabi |
| 1989 | Sikandra | Punjabi |
| 1989 | Jeenay Ki Aarzoo | Urdu |
| 1989 | Ik Jan Hayn Ham | Urdu |
| 1989 | Rogi | Punjabi |
| 1989 | Achhu 302 | Punjabi |
| 1989 | Faislo Zamir Jo | Sindhi |
| 1989 | Kala Heera | Punjabi |
| 1989 | Jurm-o-Qanoon | Urdu |
| 1990 | Siren | Punjabi |
| 1990 | Babul | Punjabi |
| 1990 | Palay Khan | Punjabi |
| 1990 | Khatarnak | Punjabi |
| 1990 | Qudrat Da Inteqam | Punjabi |
| 1990 | Chann Badmash | Punjabi |
| 1990 | Kufr-o-Islam | Urdu |
| 1991 | Kalay Chor | Punjabi / Urdu |
| 1991 | Sar Phira | Punjabi |
| 1991 | Aalmi Jasoos | Punjabi / Urdu |
| 1991 | Gandasa | Punjabi |
| 1991 | Badmash Thug | Punjabi / Urdu |
| 1991 | Pasoori Badshah | Punjabi |
| 1991 | Gangva | Punjabi |
| 1991 | Pyar Hi Pyar | Punjabi / Urdu |
| 1992 | Zindagi | Punjabi / Urdu |
| 1992 | Mera Inteqam | Punjabi |
| 1993 | Da Nakrezo Shpa | Pashto |
| 1994 | Malang Bacha | Pashto |
| 1996 | Iqtadar | Punjabi |
| 1997 | Ghail | Urdu |
| 2025 | Welcome to Punjab | Urdu |

== Awards and recognition ==
| Year | Award | Category | Result | Title | Ref. |
|---|---|---|---|---|---|
| 1975 | Nigar Award | Best Actress | Won | Jaadu | |
| 1978 | Nigar Award | Special Award | Won | Haidar Ali | |
| 1979 | Nigar Award | Best Actress | Won | Nizam Daku | |
| 1980 | Nigar Award | Best Actress | Won | Sohra Te Jawai | |
| 1985 | Nigar Award | Best Actress | Won | Dhee Rani | |
