= Zindagi (1978 film) =

1978 film

Zindagi زندگی
- film poster
- Directed by: Nazar-ul-Islam
- Written by: Bashir Niaz
- Based on: Walking Tall by Phil Karlson
- Produced by: Ahmed Shamsi
- Starring: Babra Sharif; Nadeem; Mustafa Qureshi; Tariq Aziz; Agha Talish; Nanha
- Music by: M. Ashraf
- Release date: 29 September 1978
- Country: Pakistan
- Language: Urdu
- Box office: Platinum jubilee film

Zindagi (Urdu: زندگی) is a 1978 Pakistani Urdu film. It was a platinum jubilee hit directed by Nazar-ul-Islam and screenplay by Bashir Niaz.

The cast included Babra Sharif, Nadeem, Mustafa Qureshi, Talish, and Tariq Aziz. The music was composed by M. Ashraf and lyrics by Kaleem Usmani with hit tracks like, "Tere sung dosti hum na chorrein kabhi" and "Jungle mein mangle tere hi dum se".

Zindagi received a Nigar Award in the best lyricist category.

== Plot ==
A law-abiding citizen risks his life and family fighting against a criminal gang for the betterment of society.

== Cast ==
- Babra Sharif
- Nadeem
- Mustafa Qureshi
- Talish
- Nanha
- Sabiha Khanum
- Tariq Aziz
- Kemal Irani
- Saqi

== Production ==
Zindagi was produced by Ahmed Shamsi, directed by Nazar-ul-Islam and written by Bashir Niaz. It was partly filmed in Bangkok. The film was based on American film Walking Tall (1973).

== Soundtracks ==
Music composer: M. Ashraf, Lyricist: Kaleem Usmani

- Janay Kya Ho Geya Hay ... Singer(s): Ghulam Abbas, Mehnaz
- Jungle Mein Mangal Teray Hi Dam Say ... Singer(s): Mehnaz, A Nayyar
- Teray Sung Dosti, Ham Na Chhoren Kabhi ... Singer(s): Mehdi Hassan, Mehnaz
- Teray Sung Dosti, Ham Na Chhoren Kabhi ... Singer(s): A. Nayyar, Mehnaz
- Tujhay Dil Mein Basa Lun, Dharkan Mein Chhupa Lun ... Singer(s): Mehnaz * HALL Song ...Singer(e): Davi Franco, Felipe

== Box office ==
Zindagi was released on 29 September 1978. It completed 88 weeks at main theaters and declared as a platinum jubilee hit.

== Awards ==
Zindagi won a Nigar Award for the category of best lyricist (Kaleem Usmani).
