= Nimmo (actress) =

Pakistani actress

- نمو
- Born: Noreen Butt; 3 August 1950; Lahore, Pakistan
- Died: 16 December 2010 (aged 60); Lahore, Pakistan
- Other name: The Doll of Cinema Screen
- Education: University of Punjab
- Occupations: Actress; Model
- Years active: 1970 – 2003
- Spouse: Javed Dastgir Mirza (husband)
- Children: 1
- Parent: Shahzad Mahmood (father)
- Relatives: Nighat Butt (sister-in-law)

Noreen Butt, also known as Nimmo (Urdu: نمو; August 1950 – 16 December 2010) was a Pakistani actress and model. She was known as The Doll of the Cinema Screen because of the glamorous roles she often portrayed in films. She acted in both Urdu and Punjabi films and is known for her roles in the films Basheera, Zarq Khan, Dillagi, Chahat, Farz Aur Mamta, Khanzada, Hashar Nashar, Aina, Danka, Sangam, Chor Sipahi, Nizam Daku and Behram Daku.

== Early life ==
Noreen was born on 3 August 1950 in Lahore, Pakistan. Nimmo's father Shahzad Mahmood, also known as Rajpal, was an actor and writer in Hindi cinema in British India. Later his wife returned to India and divorced her father. After Partition of India, Nimmo's father migrated to Pakistan and went to Karachi; later he tried to build a film studio, but when that plan did not work he returned to Lahore. Nimmo's elder brother Abid Butt was an actor who married Nighat Butt, an actress. Another elder brother Zahid Butt lived in Karachi.

Noreen completed her early education from Lahore Girls College and then graduated from University of Punjab. She was interested in working in films because her father Shahzad and her brother Abid Butt were actors. Then her father supported her passion for acting so he took her with him to Nigar Khans Studio at Lahore.

== Career ==
In 1970 she gave a screen test for a film but faced a difficulty the filmmakers would declare her unsuitable for roles. Later she filed an appeal against the decision of the filmmakers in the court and she won the case in her favor. When Shabab Productions launched their new film Fasana Dil, they wanted to cast a new girl and Noreen immediately caught their attention so they cast her in the lead role opposite actor Nadeem as the hero. Shabab Kiranvi named her Nimmo while working on the film then Shabab Kiranvi asked Nimmo to sign a contract according to his terms, according to which she would not work in any other filmmaker's film for five years but Nimmo refused and left working on Fasana Dil then Deeba was cast in the lead role.

Later, filmmaker and director Aslam Dar, an acquaintance of Nimmo's father heard about her so one day he came to her house and cast her in his film Sakhi Latera. Nimmo always considered Aslam Dar a good friend. Nimmo's acting was praised in Sakhi Latera. The musical comedy film was presented in Reno Cinema in Karachi in which Nasrullah Butt played the lead role and actress Rani Begum played the lead role.

Later she signed a contract with Dreamland Pictures and made her debut as an actress in film Mujrim Kon starring along with Rozina, Zia Mohyeddin, and Allauddin which was written by Haroon Pasha and directed by Aslam Dar. The film was screened in Karachi's Regal Cinema and Aslam Dar was impressed by Nimmo's acting that he again cast her in his upcoming film.

After the success of her two films then in 1972 Nimmu portrayed the role of a brave wife in Basheera, it brought both Nimmo and Sultan Rahi to prominence, while the next year Nimmo also worked in film Zarq Khan. In 1974, Aslam Dar's classical romantic musical blockbuster Urdu film Dillagi it was a Super Hit at the box office and it received Golden Jubilee and Platinum Jubilee all the actors Shabnam, Nadeem, Nayyar Sultana, Agha Talish and Nimmo got a lot of fame.

She worked in total 113 films throughout her career and she worked in Urdu, Pashto and Punjabi films. In 2003 she worked in Punjabi Fauja Amritsaria in which Shaan did the lead role and it was directed by Sangeeta.

Then she retired and went to live with her family at Lahore.

== Personal life ==
Nimmo was married in an arranged marriage, which she described as abusive. Later she filed for divorce; she later married the magistrate who handled her divorce case and they had a daughter.

== Death ==
She died on 16 December in 2010 at Lahore and she was buried at Lahore Graveyard.

== Filmography ==
=== Film ===
Year	Film	Language
1970	Mujrim Kon	Urdu
1971	Sakhi Lutera	Urdu
1972	Basheera	Punjabi
1973	Khoon Da Darya	Punjabi
1973	Zarq Khan	Urdu
1973	Sharabi	Punjabi
1974	Dillagi	Urdu
1974	Lottery	Punjabi
1974	Chahat	Urdu
1974	Teray Jehay Putt Jamman Manwa	Punjabi
1974	Nanha Farishta	Urdu
1974	Babul Sadqay Teray	Punjabi
1974	Suhag Mera Lahu Tera	Punjabi
1975	Farz Aur Mamta	Urdu
1975	Khanzada	Punjabi
1975	Shirin Farhad	Urdu
1975	Balwant Kour	Punjabi
1975	Rajjo	Punjabi
1976	Hukam Da Ghulam	Punjabi
1976	Mom Ki Guriya	Urdu
1976	Kothay Tapni	Punjabi
1976	Wardat	Punjabi
1976	Licence	Punjabi
1976	Pathar Tay Moti	Punjabi
1976	Akh Lari Bado Badi	Punjabi
1976	Hashar Nashar	Punjabi
1976	Kil Kil Mera Naa	Punjabi
1977	Aina	Urdu
1977	Dada	Punjabi
1977	Danka	Punjabi
1977	Fraud	Punjabi
1977	Sangam	Urdu
1977	Inteqam Di Agg	Punjabi
1977	Chor Sipahi	Punjabi
1977	Neya Suraj	Urdu
1977	Baghi Tay Qanoon	Punjabi
1978	Wafadar	Punjabi
1978	Elaan	Punjabi
1978	Inqilab	Urdu
1978	Jashan	Punjabi
1979	Nizam Daku	Punjabi
1979	Iqbal-e-Jurm	Punjabi
1980	Samjhota	Urdu
1980	Behram Daku	Punjabi
1980	2 Nishan	Punjabi
1981	Qurbani	Urdu
1981	Farz	Pashto
1981	Posti	Punjabi
1982	Noukar Tay Malik	Punjabi
1982	Aab-e-Hayyat	Urdu
1982	Yaar Beli	Punjabi
1983	Heera Faqeera	Punjabi
1983	Jatt, Gujjar Tay Natt	Punjabi
1983	Sarkari Order	Punjabi
1984	Pukar	Punjabi
1984	Aag Ka Samundar	Urdu
1985	Maa Puttar	Punjabi
1986	Riksha Driver	Punjabi
1986	Kon Zabardast	Punjabi
1988	Tohfa	Punjabi
1989	Khuda Bakhsh	Punjabi
1990	Chann Badmash	Punjabi
2003	Foja Amritsaria	Punjabi
