= Kalay Chor =

1991 film

- Directed by: Nazar-ul-Islam
- Written by: Nasir Adeeb
- Story by: Habib Jalib
- Produced by: Habib Jalib
- Starring: Sultan Rahi; Javed Sheikh; Neeli; Ghulam Mohiuddin; Ismael Shah; Afzaal Ahmad; Qavi; Naghma; Mumtaz; Bahar; Nida Mumtaz; Rangeela; Moin Akhter; Abid Ali; Shafqat Cheema; Rashid Mehmood; Shagufta; Humayun Qureshi
- Narrated by: Saleem Ahmed Saleem
- Cinematography: Waqar Bukhari
- Edited by: M. Sarwar
- Music by: Wajahat Attre; Lyrics; Habib Jalib; Saleem Ahmed Saleem; Waris Ludhyanvi; Singers; Noor Jehan, A. Nayyar, Mehnaz
- Production company: Evernew Studio
- Distributed by: Habib Jalib Pictures
- Release date: 4 January 1991 (Pakistan)
- Running time: 153 minutes
- Country: Pakistan
- Languages: Urdu/Punjabi, Double version

Kalay Chor (Punjabi: کَالے چور) is a 1991 Pakistani action film, directed by Nazar-ul-Islam and produced by Habib Jalib. The film stars Neeli, Sultan Rahi, Javed Sheikh, Ghulam Mohiuddin and Humayun Qureshi .

== Cast ==
- Sultan Rahi as (Kabira)
- Javed Sheikh as (Javed)
- Neeli as (Lashi)
- Ghulam Mohiuddin as (Sher Jang)
- Humayun Qureshi as (Kaali)
- Rangeela
- Abid Ali as (Ashiq Shah)
- Afzaal Ahmed as (Sher Afghan)
- Bahar as (mother of Neeli)
- Naghma as (mother of kabira)
- Moin Akhter
- Shagufta as (Sher jang sister)
- Nida Mumtaz - (Guest)
- Rashid Mehmood
- Qavi Khan as (Press reporter)
- Akhtar Shad as (CID Officer)
- Mansoor Baloch as (Dupty Jafar)
- Mian Badal
- Mumtaz as Lashi'sister
- Shafqat Cheema

== Soundtrack ==
کَالے چور Kalay Chor

Soundtrack album by Wajahat Attre
- Released: 1991
- Recorded: 1991
- Genre: Film soundtrack
- Length: 31:04
- Language: Punjabi
- Director: Nazar-ul-Islam
- Producer: Habib Jalib

=== Track listing ===
No.	Title	Artist(s)	Length
1.	"Tan De Ujlay Man De"	Noor Jehan	5:00
2.	"Chala Padey Ranjhna"	Noor Jehan	4:15
3.	"Hay Main Kha Lai Hari Mirch"	Noor Jehan & A Nayyar	4:40
4.	"Kahe Yeh Har Koi Mujh Ko"	Noor Jehan	6:34
5.	"Tera Mukhda Chan Da"	Mehnaz	4:12
6.	"Sajan Mere Aa"	Noor Jehan	4:21

== Awards ==
Kalay Chor received a Nigar Award for the Best Actor (Javed Sheikh) category.
