= Suroor Barabankvi =

Poet and writer (1930 - 1980)

- Born: Syed Saeed ur Rehman; 30 January 1919; Barabanki, British India
- Died: 13 April 1980 (aged 61); Dhaka, Bangladesh
- Resting place: Karachi, Pakistan
- Occupations: Poet, film songs writer and film director
- Writing career
- Pen name: Suroor Barabankvi
- Language: Urdu
- Years active: 1951 – 1980

Syed Saeed-ur-Rehman, also known by his pen name Suroor Barabankvi, (Urdu: سرور بارہ بنکوی 30 January 1919 – 13 April 1980), was a Pakistani Urdu poet and lyricist.

== Life and career ==
Born Syed Saeed ur Rehman in Barabanki, Uttar Pradesh, British India in 1919, he wrote under the pseudonym Suroor (exhilaration). He started his poetry at the age of 18.

He recited his poetry to Jigar Moradabadi, who appreciated his poetic talent. In 1951, Suroor participated in the Independence Day Mushaira at Dhaka, East Pakistan along with Jigar Moradabadi.

In 1952, he visited East Pakistan where the noted Urdu scholar Abdul Haq offered him the job of General Secretary of the ‘'Anjuman-i Taraqqi-i Urdu’', at their Dhaka branch office and he started a magazine named ‘Filkaar’ there. He also directed three films, all in Urdu: Aakhri Station (1965) in East Pakistan, and Tum Mere Ho (1968) and Aashna (1970) in West Pakistan. He also wrote some songs for the film Dhamaka, written by Ibn-e-Safi, released in December 1974.

== Selected film songs ==
Song title	Singer	Lyrics by	Music by	Film notes
Kuch Apni Kahyye, Kuch Meri Suniye	Bashir Ahmad and Ferdausi Begum	Suroor Barabankvi	Robin Ghosh	Talash (1963 film)
Mein Rickshawala Bechara	Bashir Ahmad	Suroor Barabankvi	Robin Ghosh	Talash (1963 film)
Humein Kho Kar Bahut Pachhtao Gay, Jab Hum Nahin Haun Gay	Runa Laila	Suroor Barabankvi	Robin Ghosh	Ehsaas (1972 film)
Samaa Woh Khwab Sa Samaa	Akhlaq Ahmed	Suroor Barabankvi	Robin Ghosh	Nahin Abhi Nahin (1980)

== Filmography ==
- Chanda (1962) (Suroor Barabankvi wrote its story, script and film songs)
- Talash (1963)
- Chand Aur Chandni (1966)
- Kajal (1965)
- Milan (1964)
- Tum Meray Ho (1968) (based on Krishan Chander's short story, Anjaan)
- Aashna (1970)
- Ehsaas (1972)
- Dhamaka (1974)
- Aina (1977)
- Nahin Abhi Nahin (1980)
- Kiran Aur Kali (1981)

== Death ==
In 1980, Suroor Barabankvi went to Dhaka to finalize arrangements for shooting a film where he had a heart attack and died on 13 April 1980. His body was brought to Karachi, Pakistan for burial.

== See also ==
- Ghazal
- Khumar Barabankvi
