= Khawaja Pervaiz =

Pakistani film songs writer (1930–2011)

Khawaja Pervez
- Born: Khawaja Ghulam Mohiuddin; 28 December 1930; Amritsar, British India
- Died: 20 June 2011 (aged 80); Lahore, Pakistan
- Occupations: Film songwriter, film screenwriter
- Years active: 1965 – 2011
- Relatives: Bubloo Butt (son)
- Awards: 5 Nigar Awards in 1985, 1992, 1993, 1994 and 1995

Khawaja Pervez (Urdu: خواجہ پرویز; 28 December 1930 – 20 June 2011) was a prominent Pakistani film composer- lyricist and film songwriter for both Urdu and Punjabi language films. His birth name was Khawaja Ghulam Mohiuddin. His professional career spanned over 40 years.

== Early life ==
Khawaja Ghulam Mohiuddin, popularly known as Khawaja Pervaiz, was born into a Kashmiri Muslim family in Amritsar, Punjab, British India. After the independence of Pakistan in 1947, his family along with him moved to Lahore. He graduated from Dayal Singh College, Lahore in 1954.

== Career ==
Khawaja Pervaiz's college friend Zafar Iqbal who was a son of film director Wali Sahib introduced him to his father who later hired him as an assistant. He worked with Wali Sahib while the latter was making the films Guddi Gudda (1956), Lukan Miti (1959) and Sohni Kumharan (1960).

Khawaja Pervez's first film, as a lyricist, was Diljeet Mirza's Rawaj in 1965 in Pakistan. He got a big breakthrough from the song "Tum hee ho mehboob meray" in the film Aina (1966) sung by Irene Perveen and Masood Rana, and composed by Manzoor Ashraf, who later became known as music director M. Ashraf. He was the lyricist for numerous very famous songs, including "Sunn Wey Balori Akh Waleya", "Jub Koi Pyar Sai Bulai Ga, Tum Ko Aik Shakhs Yaad Aiy Ga", "Kisay Da Yaar Na Wichray", "Mahi Aavey Gaa, Main Phullaan Naal Dharti Sajawan Gi", "Meri Chichi Da Challa Mahi La Layaa", "Do Dil Ik Doojay Kolun Door Ho Gayey", "Teray Bina Yuun Gharrian Beetien, Jaisay Saddian Beet Gayien", "Jan-e-Jan Tu Jo Kahay, Gaaoon Mein Geet Naey", and "Dil-e-Veeran Hay, Teri Yaad Hay, Tanhai Hai".

In a career spanning four decades, he wrote more than 15,000 film songs, out of which around 5,000 songs were sung by Noor Jehan alone. He was a well-sought-after and popular film songwriter and his songs were sung by almost all well-known Pakistani vocalists of the time, including Mehdi Hassan, Masood Rana, Ahmed Rushdi, Nahid Akhtar, Mehnaz, Runa Laila, Mala (Pakistani singer), Nayyara Noor, Inayat Hussain Bhatti, Musarrat Nazir and many others. Many of the popular Qawwali songs performed by the renowned Nusrat Fateh Ali Khan were written by Khawaja Pervez.

== Some of his popular songs ==
| Song title | Sung by | Music by | Film and year |
|---|---|---|---|
| Tum Hee Ho Mehboob Meray | Irene Perveen and Masood Rana | M Ashraf | film Aina (1966) |
| Saamney Aa Ke Tujh Ko Pukara Nahin, Teri Ruswai Mujh Ko Gawara Nahin | Mehdi Hassan | M Ashraf | film Dard (1968) |
| Meri Chichi Da Challa Mahi La Laya | Noor Jehan | M Ashraf | film Dhee Rani (1969) |
| Jab Koie Piyar Se Bulaye Ga | Mehdi Hassan | M. Ashraf | film Zindagi Kitni Haseen Hai (1969) |
| Sunn Wey Balori Akh Waleya | Noor Jehan | Ustad Tafu | film Anwara (1970) |
| Dil Bhi Dahk Dahk Paey Dhamaalan, Nachhan Lag Paey Saah, Sohnia Teray Jee Sadaqay, Hore Mein Aakhan Ki Sadaqay | Noor Jehan | Ustad Tafu | film Pehlwan Jee in London (1971) |
| Wey Sab Taun Sohnia, Haey Wey Mun Mohania | Tassawar Khanum | Nazir Ali | film Rangeela (1970) |
| Akhh Lari Bado Badi, Mauqa Milay Kadi Kadi | Noor Jehan | Bakhshi Wazir | film Banarsi Thugg (1973) |
| Nashian Nay Saadia, Hulia Wigaaria | Masood Rana | Bakhshi Wazir | film Banarsi Thugg (1973) |
| Pyar Bharay Do Sharmeelay Nain | Mehdi Hassan | Robin Ghosh | film Chahat (1974) |
| Meri Vail Di Qameez Ajj Phaat Gai Ae | Noor Jehan | Ustad Tafu | film Dada (1977) |
| Yehi Hai Pyaarey Zindagi, Kabhi Hain Gham Kabhi Khushi | Akhlaq Ahmed | Kamal Ahmed | film Prince (1978) |
| Rab Jaanay Sahnun Te Tu Maar Suttia, Phul Pattian Teray Kohlon Mein Duur Howan, Jehray Din Mein Mar Gai, Meinun Rona Panj Daryawaan | Noor Jehan | Ustad Tafu | film Sohra Te Jawai (1980) |
| Jai Mein Hoondi Dholna Sonay Di Taweetri | Noor Jehan | Wajahat Attre | film Sholay (1984) |
| Mahi Aaway Ga Mein Phullan Naal Dharti Sajawan Gi | Noor Jehan | Nazir Ali | film Qaidi (1986) |
| Mera Laung Gawacha | Musarrat Nazir | Wazir Afzal | A Pakistan Television Corporation production |
| Sahnun Ik Pal Chaen Na Aaway Sajna Terey Bina | Nusrat Fateh Ali Khan | Nusrat Fateh Ali Khan | 1993 released |
| Aaja Teinun Akhiyan Udeek Diyan, Dil Waajan Marda | Nusrat Fateh Ali Khan | Nusrat Fateh Ali Khan | A highly popular qawwali in Pakistan and some overseas regions |
| Jo Na Mil Saka Wohi Bewafa | Noor Jehan | | Film Sham Se Pehle Aa Jana (2009) |

== Death and legacy ==
Pervez died at the Mayo Hospital, Lahore after a protracted illness at age 80 due to a prolonged illness with asthma & diabetes complications. He also had a heart attack before his death. He left behind two widows, five sons, six daughters and five Nigar Awards. He was buried at Miani Sahib Graveyard in Lahore where a lot of showbiz celebrities were in attendance including folk singer Shaukat Ali, actors Iftikhar Thakur and Sohail Ahmed. Also present were famous film producers Syed Noor and Shehzad Rafiq. His fellow poet Riaz ur Rehman Saghar said that Khawaja Pervez always helped other artists in their difficult times.

Veteran Pakistani film music director Wajahat Attre paid a tribute to him on his death anniversary in 2016 by reportedly saying: "He was an asset of our country. We enjoyed a long association and friendship and I bear witness to the fact that Pervaiz was enriched with creativity and talent".

== Awards and recognition ==
- 5 Nigar Awards for Best Lyricist in 1985, 1992, 1993, 1994 and 1995
