= Bandish (1980 Pakistani film) =

1980 Pakistani Urdu film

Bandish (1980) بندش
- Directed by: Nazar-ul-Islam
- Written by: Bashir Niaz
- Based on: Random Harvest (1942)
- Produced by: Ahmad Shamsi
- Starring: Shabnam; Nadeem; Dana Christina; Allauddin; Agha Talish
- Cinematography: Riaz Bukhari
- Music by: Robin Ghosh
- Production company: Oriental Films
- Release date: 11 January 1980
- Countries: Pakistan, Indonesia
- Languages: Urdu, Indonesian

Bandish (Urdu: بندش) is a Pakistani romantic drama Urdu film released in 1980. It was directed by Nazar-ul-Islam and the top cast included Shabnam, Nadeem, and Diana Christina. Bandish was shot in Pakistan and Indonesia. The film was a commercial success and won 7 Nigar Awards in different categories. The movie's songs, "Sona Na Chandi Na Koi Mahal" and "Do Pyasay Dil Ek Hue Hain" became the most iconic melodies of the era. The movie was inspired by the 1942 Hollywood film Random Harvest.

== Plot ==
The central idea of Bandish was taken from the Hollywood film Random Harvest (1942). The story is about a married Pakistani man who is a son of an industrialist and husband of a loving wife. He goes on a business trip to Indonesia. There he receives a head injury in a boat accident. Though he survives the accident and reaches ashore on an island but due to the trauma, he now experiences amnesia, forgetting his personal identity and his family back in Pakistan. On the island, he meets an Indonesian girl who takes him to her home and takes care of him. Days pass by and the Indonesian girl starts learning his language, Urdu. Meanwhile, his wife starts tracking him and finally finds him. Then a drama occurs between the three characters; a man with lost memory, a worried wife, and a girl in love with a foreigner.

== Cast ==
- Shabnam
- Nadeem
- Diana Christina (from Indonesia),
- Roy Marten
- Aminah Cendrakasih
- Zainal Abidin
- Talish
- Allauddin
- Nafeesa Hassan
- Master Amir
- Talat Hussain (guest appearance)

== Music and soundtracks ==
The music of Bandish was composed by Robin Ghosh and it was one of the strongest points of the film. The soundtracks became very popular:

- Do Pyasay Dil Eik Huway Hayn Aisay... Singers: Mehdi Hassan, Mehnaz, Poet: Taslim Fazli
- Achha Achha Laago Ray... Singers: Nayyara Noor, A Nayyar, Poet: Riaz ur Rehman Saghar
- Hello Hello Saing... Singers: Nayyara Noor, A Nayyar, Poet: Tasleem Fazli
- Sona Na Chandi Na Koi Mahal Jan-e-Mann... Singer: Akhlaq Ahmed, Poet: Saeed Gilani
- Tujhay Dil Say Laga Loun Palkon Mein Chhupa Loun... Singers: Mehnaz, Poet: Tasleem Fazli

== Reception and reviews ==
Bandish did well at the box office and completed 88 weeks in theaters. The film received very positive reviews from cinema fans and the critics. Due to the Indonesian actress Diana Kristina, Bandish also got attention in Indonesia.

== Awards ==
Bandish won 7 Nigar Awards in the following categories:

- Best supporting actor: Allauddin
- Best lyricist: Tasleem Fazli
- Best cinematographer: Kamran Mirza
- Best playback female singer: Mehnaz
- Best playback male singer: Akhlaq Ahmed
- Best film editor: K.D. Mirza
- Special award: Diana Kristina
