= Khushboo (1979 film) =

Pakistani film

- Directed by: Nazar Shabab
- Screenplay by: Bashir Niaz
- Starring: Rani; Shahid; Mumtaz; Nayyar Sultana; Rangeela
- Music by: M. Ashraf
- Production company: Shabab Art Productions
- Release date: 25 August 1979
- Country: Pakistan
- Language: Urdu

Khushboo (transl. Fragrance) is a 1979 Pakistani film directed by Nazar Shabab. It is produced by A. Hameed and music was composed by M. Ashraf.

The lead cast of the film includes Rani, Shahid, Mumtaz with Nayyar Sultana and Rangeela in the supporting cast. It was released on 25 August 1979, on the occasion of Eid-ul-Fitr, and was a golden jubilee hit at the box office.

== Awards ==
Main Jis Din Bhula Dun Tera Pyar Dil Se was a popular track from the film's soundtrack and won a Nigar Award for the playback singer Mehnaz in 1979.

== Plot ==
A young, arrogant and spoilt businessman Amjad marries Zeenat to avenge the slaps that she has given him when he mistreated her. After marriage, he imprisons her in the house. She initially hopes to make him a good person with her love, but on constant deprivation of respect by him, she decides to teach him a lesson. She devises a plan to spend a night with him and does it with the help of an employee of his. Amjad, who spends nights with girls, consummates their relationship that night, unknowing that she is his wife. Zeenat then becomes pregnant and hopes to birth a boy who can avenge her insult from him. He then throws her out of the house when he discovers her pregnancy. She then gives birth to a girl, Sitara.

Amjad's first wife dies after giving birth to a girl, Salma. Years passed and she ages and spends these years deprived of her father's love due to his nature. On the other hand, Zeenat's daughter Siatara also becomes older and learns of his father and his treatment with her mother. She decides to take revenge on her father and starts living in his house as Salma, due to having a similar face. With a series of events, she brings her father to the right path and in the end gets her mother her due respect.

== Cast ==
- Rani as Zeenat
- Shahid as Amjad
- Mumtaz as Sitara & Salma
- Nayyar Sultana
- Rangeela
- Ibrahim Nafees

== Soundtrack ==
All lyrics are written by Masroor Anwar; all music is composed by M. Ashraf

Khushboo
No.	Title	Singer (s)	Length
1.	"Aao Kahin Door Chalain"	Mehnaz, Mehdi Hassan
2.	"Main Jis Din Bhula Dun Tera Pyar Dil Sey"	Mehnaz
3.	"Main Jis Din Bhula Dun Tera Pyar Dil Sey"	Mehdi Hassan

Main Jis Din Bhula Dun Tera Pyar Dil Sey was a popular track from the film's soundtrack, in the vocals of Mehnaz and Mehdi Hassan. The song is considered as a classic and one of the best song by Mehnaz. It was plagiarized by the music director Raamlaxman for the 1990 Indian film Police Public as well.
