= Doorian =

1984 film

- Directed by: Hassan Askari
- Written by: Bashir Niaz
- Produced by: S. A. Gul
- Starring: Shabnam; Mohammed Ali; Faisal Rehman; Agha Talish
- Music by: Robin Ghosh
- Production company: Evernew Productions
- Release date: 6 April 1984
- Country: Pakistan
- Language: Urdu

Doorian (Urdu: دوریاں, lit. 'Estrangement') is a 1984 Pakistani film directed by Hassan Askari, based on a story by Bashir Niaz, and produced by S. A. Gul under the banner Evernew Pictures.

A golden jubilee hit film of the year, it received seven Nigar Awards including "best film". Doorian was also remade in Bollywood as Aandhiyan (1990).

== Plot ==
The rich and influential husband mistreats his wife, leading to her separation from him. The plot then revolves around her struggle to get custody of her son and lead her life as a single parent.

== Cast ==
- Shabnam
- Mohammed Ali
- Faisal Rehman
- Agha Talish
- Arzoo
- Hanif
- Ibrahim Nafees

=== Guest cast ===
- Ghulam Mohiuddin
- Aslam Pervaiz
- Afzaal Ahmad
- Nanha
- Rangeela
- Firdous Jamal

== Soundtrack ==
All songs were written by lyricist Saeed Gillani and the music was composed by Robin Ghosh.

=== Track list ===
Song	Performance by
"Tere qadmo ko chhumu ga"	Zoheb Hassan, Nazia Hassan
"Bas ek tere siwa koi nahi hai mera"	Ikhlaaq Ahmed, Mehnaz Begum
"Sapna, dekha tha chota sa sapna"	Ikhlaaq Ahmed, Mehnaz Begum
"Basti ka kaam hai jalna"	Mehnaz Begum
"Jab bhi bhoolna chaha, tum yaad aaye"	Mehnaz Begum
"Khoye ho na janay tum kahan"	Nayyara Noor

Bas Ek Tere Siwa was remade in the 1990 Indian film Aandhiyan as Dunya Mein Tere Siva pictured on Prosenjit Chatterjee and Mumtaz.

It was also remade in the 1990 film Aashiqui as Jaane Jigar Jaaneman pictured on the film's main characters.

== Remake ==
The film was remade in Hindi in 1990 with the title Aandhiyan, starring Shatrughan Sinha, Mumtaz, Prosenjit Chatterjee.

== Awards ==
At the annual Nigar Awards ceremony, Doorian won seven awards in the following categories:

Category	Recipient
Best Film	Evernew Productions
Best Director	Hassan Askari
Best Scriptwriter	Bashir Niaz
Best Musician	Robin Ghosh
Best Art director	Haji Mohiuddin
Best Playback female singer	Nayyara Noor
Best Playback male singer	Ikhlaaq Ahmed
