= List of Pakistani film singers =

This article contains the list of the past, present and forthcoming film singers that are based in Pakistan. Following are the most popular Pakistani film singers of all times.

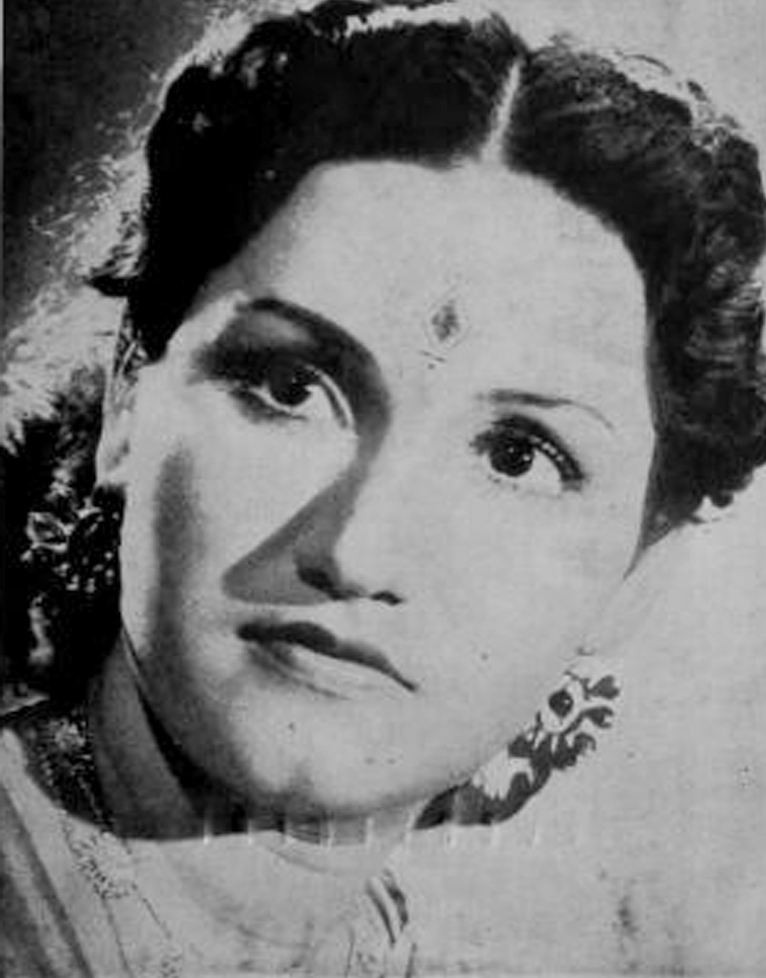
Noor Jehan

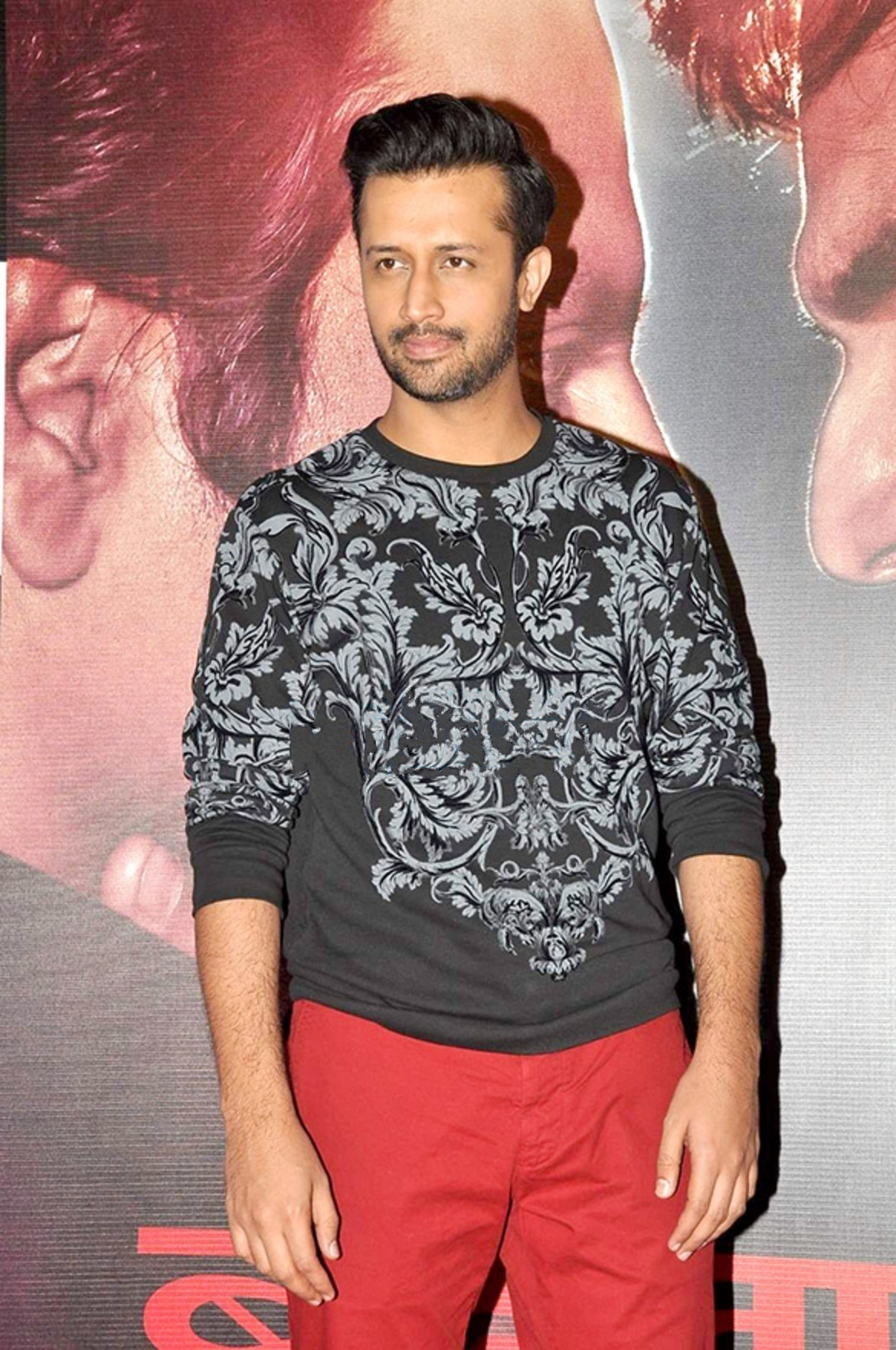
Atif Aslam

For more film singers by their letter specifications you can find it below.

== A ==
- Ahmed Rushdi
- Atif Aslam
- Alamgir Haq

== G ==
- Ghulam Ali
- Gul Panra

== H ==
- Hadiqa Kiyani
- Humera Arshad

== I ==
- Inayat Hussain Bhatti

== J ==
- Jawad Ahmed

== L ==
- Laila Khan

== M ==
- Mala
- Masood Rana
- Mehdi Hassan

== N ==
- Naseem Begum
- Nayyara Noor
- Nazia Hassan
- Noor Jehan
- Nusrat Fateh Ali Khan

== R ==
- Rahat Fateh Ali Khan

== S ==
- Shafqat Amanat Ali Khan
- Shoukat Ali Khan

== W ==
- Waris Baig

== Z ==
- Zoheb Hassan
- Zubaida Khanum

== See also ==
- Music of Pakistan
- List of Pakistanis
- Music of South Asia
- Culture of Pakistan
