= Aaj Aur Kal (1976 film) =

1976 Pakistani Urdu film

- آج اور کل
- Directed by: S. Suleman
- Screenplay by: Bashir Niaz
- Story by: Nazir Ajmeri
- Produced by: Irfan Malik
- Starring: Shabnam; Rahat Kazmi; Nisho; Ghulam Mohiuddin; Qavi; Lehri; Tamanna; Najma Mehboob; Kamal Irani; Rangeela
- Music by: Khalil Ahmed
- Release date: 9 April 1976
- Country: Pakistan
- Language: Urdu

Aaj Aur Kal (Urdu: آج اور کل) is a 1976 Pakistani Urdu-language social film directed by S. Suleman. The lead cast included Shabnam, Rahat Kazmi, Nisho, Ghulam Mohiuddin, Qavi, and Lehri. The film was a remake of director Nazir Ajmeri's Paigham (1964). Aaj Aur Kal was a diamond jubilee hit at the box office and won 8 Nigar Awards in different categories, including the "best film" of the year. The film was produced by Irfan Malik..

== Cast ==
- Shabnam
- Rahat Kazmi
- Nisho
- Ghulam Mohiuddin
- Qavi
- Lehri
- Tamanna
- Najma Mehboob
- Ibrahim Nafees
- Kamal Irani
- Rangeela (guest appearance)

== Release and box office ==
Aaj Aur Kal was released on 9 April 1976. It achieved a diamond jubilee film status by its successful long run at theaters in Pakistan.

== Music and soundtracks ==
The music of Aaj Aur Kal was composed by Khalil Ahmed and songs were penned by Tasleem Fazli:

- Aagay Aagay Dekhiye Hota Hay Kya — Singer: Naheed Akhtar
- Dunya Walo, Jahez Ki Laanat, Aaj To Hay, Kya Kal Bhi Rahya Gi — Singer: Noor Jehan
- Ham Ko Mita Sakay Dunya — Singers: Naheed Akhtar and others.
- Pyar Ka Waada Aisay Nibhayen — Singers: Mehdi Hassan, Mehnaz
- Saheli Jao Pia Ke Dea — Singer: Mehnaz

== Awards ==
Aaj Aur Kal won 8 Nigar Awards for the following categories:

Category	Awardee
Best film of 1976	Irfan Malik
Best director	S. Suleman
Best script writer	Nazir Ajmeri
Best screenplay	Bashir Niaz
Best supporting actor	Qavi
Best sound editor	A.Z. Baig
Best comedian	Lehri
Best female playback singer	Noor Jehan
