= Ehsaas =

Ehsaas may refer to:

- Ehsaas (1972 film), a Pakistani Urdu-language film
- Ehsaas: The Feeling, a 2001 Indian Hindi-language film
- Ahsaas, a 1979 Indian Hindi-language romantic film
