= Khalil Ahmed =

Pakistani film score composer (1936 - 1997)

Background information
- Born: Khalil Ahmed; 3 March 1936; Agra, British India
- Origin: Pakistan
- Died: 22 July 1997 (aged 61) Lahore, Pakistan
- Genres: Film music, Television music composer, Radio music composer
- Occupations: Composer, music director
- Years active: 1962 – 1994

Khalil Ahmed (3 March 1936 – 22 July 1997) was a Pakistani composer for radio, television, and films. He started his career with film Aanchal (1962) and remained one of the leading music directors in Pakistan in the 1960s.

He composed several memorable songs for Radio Pakistan and Pakistan Television in the 1960s, 1970s and 1980s.

== Early life ==
Khalil Ahmed was born on 3 March 1936, in Agra, British India. He migrated to Pakistan in 1952.

== Career ==
=== Film ===
Khalil Ahmed made his music debut with director Al-Hamid's film Aanchal (1962), which was released on 7 December 1962, starring Shamim Ara, Darpan, Saba and Talish. The song "kisi chaman mein raho, tum bahar ban ke raho" (singer Ahmed Rushdi) became a smash hit in Pakistan and established Khalil's name as a film composer. He quickly became one of the stalwarts of Pakistani film industry.

Khalil Ahmed always had his finger on the pulse of what the listeners wanted to hear on radio, television and in his films. He composed music for film Khamosh Raho (1964) and recorded a Nazm in Ahmed Rushdi's voice Mein nahi manta (lyrics Habib Jalib) which became famous all over Pakistan.

He also gave hit music of film Khilona (1967). The songs "Chand se chandni" and "Gul kahoon khushboo kahoon" both recorded in Ahmed Rushdi's voice were very popular. An accomplished composer for television and films, Khalil's many contributions to music had made him a popular Pakistani film music composer. For example:"Uss kay gham ko kya kahayye" (singer: Mehdi Hassan, film Guriya, producer-director: Himayat Ali Shair. This film could not be released. Khalil Ahmed was a specialist in sad compositions and he became one of the top composers of the 1960s after composing the songs of film Kaneez (1965 film). Song "Jab rat dhali tum yaad aye" (singer Mala and Ahmed Rushdi) became a popular song. His last movie, "Anokha Piyar", was released in 1994. Khalil Ahmed was one of Pakistan film industry's prominent musicians in the 1960s and 1970s, composing film music in over 40 films.

=== Television ===
In 1978, Khalil began hosting a music program for children, which was telecast from the Pakistan Television, Lahore station. It was called "Hum Kaliyan Hum Taare" with co- host Nayyara Noor, Tahira Syed and the young Niazi Brothers (known as folk singers Babar and Javed Niazi in 2024). After joining PTV, he composed some memorable songs using voices of most prominent singers of the time; Nayyara Noor, Nahid Akhtar, Farida Khanum, Amanat Ali Khan, Masood Rana, Musarrat Nazir, to name a few. His melody, "Insha Jee Uthho Ab Kooch Karo", penned by Ibn-e-Insha and sang by Amanat Ali Khan, became an all-time-classic.

According to the veteran Pakistan Television Corporation producer/director Khawaja Najmul Hassan, "I was doing a program 'Andaz Apna Apna' at the time (in the 1980s). Khalil Ahmed composed the tune and we asked Farida Khanumm to sing it. The song was Mein nay pairon main payal tou bandhey nahin". It was poet Tasleem Fazli's last wish that she sing this song.

== Popular television songs ==
Song	Singers	Song lyrics by	Remarks
Chanjhar Phabdi Na Mutiar Bina	Tahira Syed	Baba Alam Siyah Posh	A PTV, Lahore production
Insha Ji Utho Abb Kooch Karo	Amanat Ali Khan	Ibn-e-Insha	A Pakistan Television Production
Watan Ki Mitti Gawah Rehna	Nayyara Noor	Sehba Akhtar	A PTV, Karachi Centre production
Hamara Parcham Yeh Pyara Parcham, Parchamon Mein Yeh Azeem Parcham	Naheed Akhtar	Saif Zulfi	A PTV production
Honton Pe Kabhi Un Ke Mera Naam Hi Aye	Amanat Ali Khan	Ada Jafri	A PTV production
Main Ne Pairon Mein Payal To Bandhi Nahein	Farida Khanum	Tasleem Fazli	A PTV production. Reportedly it was poet Taslim Fazli's last wish that Farida Khanum sing his song
Jalay To Jalayo Gori	Nayyara Noor	Ibn e Insha	A PTV production
Chalay To Kut Hi Jaye Ga Safar Ahista Ahista	Musarrat Nazir	Mustafa Zaidi	A PTV production
Jug Jug Jiye Mera Piyara Watan	Sabiha Khanum	Masroor Anwar	A PTV production
Millat Ka Pasban Hai Muhammad Ali Jinnah	Masood Rana	Mian Bashir Ahmed	A PTV production

== Super-hit film songs ==
Song	Singers	Song lyrics by	Film and year
Kisi Chaman Mein Raho, Tum Bahar Bun Ke Raho, Khuda Karey Kisi Dil Ka Qaraar Bun Ke Raho	Ahmed Rushdi	Himayat Ali Shair	Aanchal (1962)
Na Chhura Sako Gay Daaman, Na Nazar Bacha Sako Gay	Naseem Begum	Himayat Ali Shair	Daaman (1963)
Mein Nay Tau Pareet Nibhaii, Sanwaria Re Nikla Tu Harjai	Mala	Himayat Ali Shair	Khamosh Raho (1964)
Ghair Ki Baataun Ka Aakhir Aitbaar Aa Hee Gaya	Naseem Begum	Agha Hashar Kashmiri	Kaneez (1965)
Sathio Mujahido Jaag Utha Hai Sara Watan (a patriotic song)	Masood Rana and Shaukat Ali	Himayat Ali Shair	Mujahid (1965)
Chanda Ke Hindole Mein, Urran Khatole Mein, Ammi Ka Dulara Soey	Sorayya Hyderabadi	Himayat Ali Shair	Lori (1966)
Woh Nabiyon Mein Rehmat Laqab Panay Wala	Masood Rana	Altaf Hussain Hali	Tasvir (1966)
Teri Khatir Zamaney Bhar Ko Hum Thukra Kay Aaen Hain	Runa Laila	Himayat Ali Shair	Wali Ehad (1968)
Pyaar Ka Waada Aisay Nibhain, Koi Juda Karne Na Paaey	Mehdi Hassan and Mehnaz	Taslim Fazli	Aaj Aur Kal (1976)

== Death ==
Khalil Ahmed died on 22 July 1997, in Lahore, Pakistan at age 61.
