= Mitti Ke Putlay =

Pakistani film

- Poster
- Directed by: Ehtesham
- Written by: Ehtesham; Nadeem
- Produced by: Nadeem
- Starring: Nadeem; Nisho; Yasmeen Khan; Afzaal Ahmad; Qavi; Munawar Saeed
- Music by: M. Ashraf; Muslehuddin
- Release date: 22 February 1974
- Country: Pakistan
- Language: Urdu

Mitti Ke Putlay is a Pakistani film, directed by Ehtesham, produced by Nadeem, and both co-wrote the screenplay. The film revolves around the struggle and rights of workers. The music for the film was composed by M. Ashraf and Muslehuddin. It won the Lenin Prize in the USSR.

== Cast ==
- Nadeem
- Nisho
- Afzaal Ahmad
- Yasmeen Khan
- Qavi Khan
- Munawar Saeed
