= Alamgir (singer) =

Pakistani musical artist (born 1955)

Alamgir عالمگیر PP NA
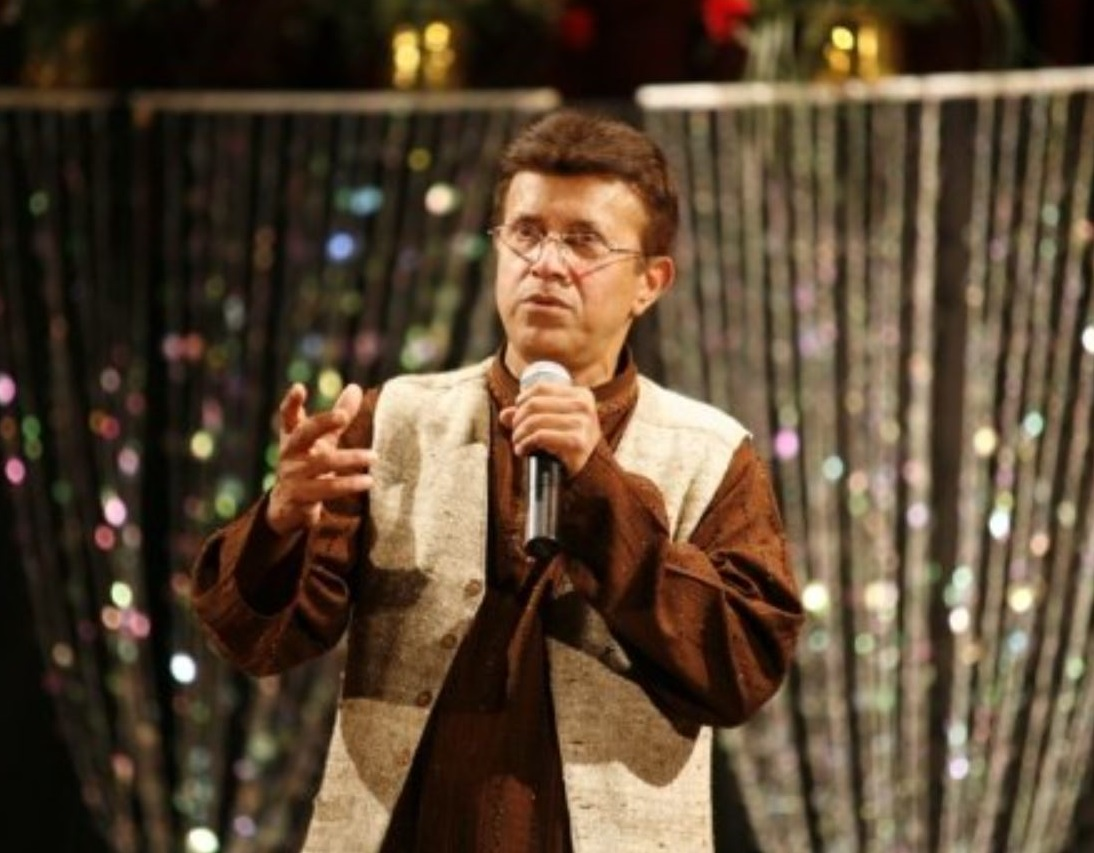

Background information
- Also known as: Baba-e-Pop, Elvis of the East
- Born: Alamgir Haq; 11 August 1955 (age 71); Rangpur
- Genres: Pop; Playback singing
- Occupations: Singer; Musician
- Instrument: Vocals
- Years active: 1970–present

Alamgir Haq is a Bengali singer-songwriter, guitarist, and one of the pioneers of pop music in Pakistan who is also widely well-known in Bangladesh. Referred to as the Elvis of the East, his style of singing is inspired by playback singer Ahmed Rushdi and Elvis Presley.

== Life and career ==
Alamgir was born on 11 August 1955 in Rangpur, Bangladesh. His father, Farmuzal Haq, was a politician and a member of the All India Muslim League as Secretary of Treasury and later a member of Pakistan's National Assembly during the presidency of Ayub Khan. The Haq family's Bengali heritage shaped Alamgir's early cultural environment, immersing him in the vibrant traditions of Bangladesh amid the pre- and post-partition political fervor.

He grew up in Dhaka, where a rich mix of local and foreign influences sparked his early interest in music. He was inspired by Bengali folk artists such as Abbasuddin Ahmed, whose renditions of traditional songs reflected the region’s cultural landscape, and was also exposed to Western icons like Elvis Presley and Indian playback singers such as Mohammed Rafi. These diverse influences shaped his multifaceted musical sensibility rooted in his Bengali heritage.

=== Education and relocation to Pakistan ===
Alamgir studied at Mirzapur Cadet College, Tangail, Bangladesh. He briefly studied at Shaheen School in Dacca. In 1971, at the age of around 15, he moved to Karachi, West Pakistan, to continue his studies at the University of Karachi before immigrating to the United States.

=== Early performances ===
Alamgir settled in the PECHS area of Karachi and began performing in the evenings around 1971 at a small café called Globe Hotel on Tariq Road. The café owner promised him Rs. 350 per month plus free dinner. Famous for its intellectual gatherings, the café was where his singing talent was first noticed. An audience member who admired his singing and guitar playing told Alamgir about a youth show on Pakistan Television called Ferozan, hosted by Khushbakht Aliya. He auditioned; Khushbakht liked his performance but had already chosen another contestant. Renowned composer Sohail Rana, who happened to be in the same room, later called Alamgir outside the TV station and offered him a job as a guitarist on his children’s program "Hum Hi Hum,". This was Alamgir’s entry into the professional music world.

=== Rise to fame ===
Alamgir began appearing on Pakistan Television in the early 1970s, when modern Urdu pop was still unfamiliar in the country and Western-style music was considered cutting-edge. Shair Siddiqui hired him for Karachi Television’s first pop music program, Sunday Ke Sunday, in 1971 and introduced him with the song “Albela Rahi,” which became a hit among the 1970s youth in 1972. For a time, music-loving young people would gather near Karachi’s Jheel Park hoping to glimpse the new pop star as he drove by in his red sports car. His second pop song, “Pyar Hai Zindagi Ka Gehna,” was also an Urdu adaptation of a foreign tune, and he quickly gained popularity with the younger generation. Alamgir is also known for performing Bengali songs, most notably “Aamay Bhashaili Rey,” which he sang on Season 6, Episode 4 of Coke Studio Pakistan.

As his career progressed, Alamgir expanded from television performances to the broader Pakistani music industry and toured internationally. He inherited polycystic kidney disease from his mother, underwent dialysis three times a week, and later received a successful kidney transplant in November 2020.

In 2012 he performed in various shows in Pakistan. Returning to the screen to reconnect with fans who grew up with him, Alamgir joined Meesha Shafi, Strings, Ali Azmat, and Shahzad Hasan as a judge on the ARY Digital singing competition Music Icons in April 2013. He also gave a live interview on the PTV morning show Subh-e-Nau on 6 January 2014.

== Artistry ==
Alamgir is widely regarded as the founder of modern Urdu pop music in Pakistan. In the 1970s he introduced Western-influenced, guitar-driven sounds and romantic ballads that laid the groundwork for later generations of musicians. Hits such as "Dekha Na Tha" shifted popular music away from traditional playback singing toward a more accessible pop format that resonated with urban youth and influenced 1980s pop artists and bands. This innovation helped establish pop as a dominant genre in Pakistan, moving beyond the film-centric music of earlier decades.

Known affectionately as "Baba-e-Pop" (Father of Pop), Alamgir also blended Bengali and Pakistani musical elements—drawing on his Bangladeshi roots—to create cross-cultural appeal. Songs like "Aamay Bhashaili Rey" exemplified this fusion by incorporating Bengali folk influences into Urdu pop, helping bridge audiences in Pakistan and Bangladesh and promoting a shared South Asian musical identity. His emphasis on heartfelt romantic ballads and electric-guitar arrangements popularized those styles and inspired a wave of singer-songwriters who adopted similar techniques for emotional storytelling. Alamgir’s enduring fanbase spans Pakistan, Bangladesh, and the South Asian diaspora, where his music continues to evoke nostalgia and cultural connection.

In 2025, he paid tribute by performing Ali Zafar’s "Balo Batiyan" at a concert; Zafar responded emotionally and praised the gesture as an honor to intergenerational musical bonds, underscoring Alamgir’s lasting cultural stature.

=== Awards and honors ===
- Lifetime Achievement Award in 2012 by PTV
- Pride of Performance Award in 2013 by the President of Pakistan
- Nigar Award for Best Playback Singer for the film Aina
- Best Singer Award in 1986 by PTV
- Lifetime Achievement Award in 2019 by Pakistan Air Force
- Lifetime Achievement Award in 2019 by Hum TV

== Personal life ==
Alamgir is married and has one son; the family keeps a low public profile. His wife has provided emotional support throughout his career, contributing to his personal stability amid demanding professional responsibilities.

After relocating to Pakistan in 1970, Alamgir settled in Karachi, where he lived and developed his career for several decades. In the late 1990s he moved to the United States with his family and made Atlanta, Georgia his primary residence. He continues to live in Atlanta while maintaining strong family ties in Pakistan through regular visits.

== Works ==
=== Singles & albums ===
- Mujahideen-e-Aflak: Tum Hi Say Aye Mujahido Jahan Ka Sabbat Hai (Produced by Pakistan Air Force)
- Aina
- Aamay Bhashaili Re
- Dekha Na Tha Kabhi Humne Ye Sama
- Dekh Tera Kia Rang Kar Dia Hai
- Gori Panghat Pe Tero
- Heart Beat (1992)
- Hum Sab Ka Pakistan
- Keh Dena
- Khayal Rakhna
- Maaon Ki Dua Puri Hui
- Shaam Se Pehlay Aana
- Cotton Fields

=== Playback songs ===
- Mujhay Dil Say Na Bhulana, Chahay Rokay Yeh Zamana ... (Duet with Mehnaz for Aina, Music: Robin Ghosh
- Waada Karo Sajna, Chhu Keh Mujhay Tum Abhi, Bichhray Gay Na ... (Duet with Mehnaz for Aina, Music: Robin Ghosh)
- Baharen, Teray Aanay Say.. (for movie Bobby And julie 1978), Music: Karim Shahabuddin
- Dekha Na Tha Kabhi Hum Ne Yeh Samaan ... (Duet with Naheed Akhtar for movie Bobby And Julie 1978), Music: Karim Shahabuddin

== See also ==
- Music of Pakistan
- Pakistani popular music
