= Badal Ghosh =

Businessman

- বাদল ঘোষ (Bengali) بدل گھوش (Urdu)
- Born: c. 1925; Baghdad, Kingdom of Iraq
- Died: Singapore
- Education: University of Dhaka
- Occupation: Businessman
- Parent(s): S.M Ghosh (father); Asnat Zia Ghosh (mother)
- Relatives: Robin Ghosh (brother) Shabnam (sister-in-law)

Badal Ghosh was a Pakistani and later Bangladeshi businessman and political donor to Sheikh Mujibur Rahman.

== Early life ==
Ghosh was born in 1925 in Baghdad. His father, S. M. Ghosh, was a Bengali Hindu, and his mother was an Iraqi Christian from Baghdad who separated after returning to Wari, Old Dhaka. He and his brothers were raised by their mother as Christians. He has two brothers, Robin Ghosh, a music director, and Ashoke Ghosh, a film director.

== Education ==
He completed his bachelor's in commerce at the University of Dhaka.

== Career ==
Ghosh owned the Dhaka-based Ajax Power Industries, which he established in the 1950s. He imported agricultural machines. The company was headuarter was on Jinnah Avenue in Dhaka. Another subsidiary, Ajax Jute Mills, was closed in 2014. Its current owner, Mohammad Kawsar Zaman Babla, alleged it was occupied by Awami League politicians because of his association with the Bangladesh Nationalist Party.

== Legal issues ==
The Special Branch investigated Ghosh in the 1960s to see if he was financing the Awami League led by Sheikh Mujibur Rahman. However, the real reason is said to be an alleged affair between Badal's brother Ashoke Ghosh and Nusrat Jahan Begum (wife of Muhammad Basit).

== Death ==
Ghosh died in Singapore.
