= A. Nayyar =

Film playback singer (1955-2016)

Arthur Nayyar
- Born: 14 April 1955; Sahiwal, Punjab, Pakistan
- Died: 11 November 2016 (aged 61); Lahore, Punjab, Pakistan
- Occupation: Singer
- Years active: 1974 – 2016
- Known for: Film playback singing
- Awards: Pride of Performance Award in 2018; 5 Nigar Awards during his film career

Arthur Nayyar (14 April 1955– 11 November 2016), commonly known as A. Nayyar, was a Pakistani film playback singer.

He started his career in 1974 with a duet song. Nayyar always claimed famous singer Ahmed Rushdi as an important contributor to his career as he learned film playback singing from Rushdi and the noted singer Mehdi Hassan helped him improve his voice quality.

Nayyar and Akhlaq Ahmed remained dominant playback singers of the Pakistani film industry in the late 1970s and throughout the 1980s.

== Early life ==
Nayyar was born in Chak No.148/9.L, Ranson Abad, a small village in the Sahiwal District, to a Christian family. His childhood was spent in Arifwala, Punjab, Pakistan and later he shifted to Lahore. He completed his matriculation from St Francis High School, Lahore and was admitted to Forman Christian College. He graduated with a bachelor's degree from the Government Central Training College in 1975. Nayyar spent his childhood watching both Indian and Pakistani films. Film playback singers like Muhammad Rafi, Talat Mehmood, and Saleem Raza inspired him.

== Career ==
Nayyar's first appearance on TV was on the show Naye Fankar ("New Artists") in 1974 after which he began his playback singing journey. He was introduced to Lollywood by Riaz Shahid, a noted filmmaker of the time, who was searching for a singing talent for his upcoming venture Bahisht (1974). He was a student of film music director Wajahat Attre and also used to go to noted ghazal singer Mehdi Hassan for guidance.

Nayyar sang over 4,200 film, radio and television songs in his singing career.

== Death ==
A. Nayyar was a heart patient during the last few years of his life. He was in a financial crisis as the film industry had totally forgotten him. On the night of 11 November 2016 Nayyar died at his residence in Lahore of a cardiac arrest after a prolonged illness. He was buried at Christian Graveyard on Jail Road, Lahore.

== Awards and recognition ==
- Pride of Performance Award by the President of Pakistan in 2018.
  5 Nigar Awards during his film career
- A. Nayyar won five Nigar Awards for playback singing. His first Nigar Award for best singer in director Hasan Askari's film "Aag" in 1979, Nigar Award for best singer in director Sangeeta's film "Jeenay naheen doon gee" in 1985, Nigar Award for best singer in director Pervez Malik's film Ghareboan ka badshah in 1988 and Nigar Award for best singer in director Sangeeta's film "Taqat ka tufaan" in 1989 and then again in 1991.

== Popular film songs ==
- Yunhin din cut jaye, yuhin shaam dhal jaye, Sung by A. Nayyar and Rubina Badar, film song lyrics by Taslim Fazli, composed by music director A. Hameed, film Bahisht (1974)
- ‘Pyar to ik din hona tha, hona tha ho gaya’, Sung by A. Nayyar with Naheed Akhtar, lyrics by Kaleem Usmani, music by M. Ashraf from the film Kharidar (1976)
- ‘Sathi mujhay mil gaya, mil gaya mil gaya’, Sung by A. Nayyar, lyrics by Fayyaz Hashmi, music by Ustad Tafu, from film Jasoos (1977)
- ‘Milay do sathi khili do kaliyan’, Sung by A. Nayyar, lyrics by Kaleem Usmani, music by Robin Ghosh from film Amber (1978)
- ‘Ik baat kahoon dildara’ Sung by A. Nayyar, film song lyrics by Fayyaz Hashmi, music by Ustad Tafu from film Khuda Aur Mohabbat (1978).
- 'Jee Rahay Hein Hum Tanha', Sung by A. Nayyar, film song lyrics by Yonus Hamdam, music by Karim Shahabuddin from film Sharmeeli (1978).

Nayyar also ran a music academy in Lahore.

== See also ==
- List of Pakistani film singers
- List of Pakistani ghazal singers
