= Bashir Niaz =

Pakistani screenwriter (1936–2002)

- Born: 9 July 1936; Gujranwala, British India
- Died: 5 August 2002 (aged 66); Lahore, Pakistan
- Education: Government Islamia College, Lahore
- Occupation: Screenwriter
- Years active: 1963–2002
- Children: 4
- Awards: 15 Nigar Awards

Bashir Niaz (9 July 1936 – 5 August 2002) was a Pakistani film story, dialogue, and screenwriter. He is known for writing scripts/dialogues for blockbuster movies like Diya aur Tofaan (1969), Aina (1977), and Bandish (1980). He won a total of 15 Nigar Awards as a dialogue/scriptwriter.

== Early life ==
Bashir Niaz was born on 9 May 1936, in Jamke Chattha, Gujranwala District, Punjab, British India (now Punjab, Pakistan). He graduated from Government Islamia College, Lahore. Then he joined journalism and worked for several magazines and journals. Later he turned towards film journalism and worked for the weekly Nigar.

== Career ==
Niaz started his career as a screenwriter in 1963 by writing a script for the movie Chhoti Behan. Initially he teamed up with directors like Shabab Kiranvi, K. Khurshid, and Haider Chowdhri. Later he developed a professional understanding with the director Nazar-ul-Islam.

Niaz was known as "the magician of dialogues", and was good at creating witty, emotional, and dramatic dialogues for the general public. In 1980, he was asked to write a Pakistani version of the Hollywood film Random Harvest (1942). He wrote the script for Bandish, a platinum jubilee hit of the year. During his long career as a screenwriter, he wrote stories and dialogues for many successful Urdu and Punjabi films.

== Filmography ==
Some of the popular films of Bashir Niaz as a screenwriter are:

- Ehsaas (1972)
- Naukar Wohti Da (1974)
- Aina (1977)
- Ambar (1978)
- Parakh (1978)
- Zindagi (1978)
- Shola (1978)
- Khushboo (1979)
- Bandish (1980)
- Noukar te maalik (1982)
- Doorian (1984)
- Dhee rani (1985)
- Hum eik hain (1986)
- Janbaaz (1987)
- Mukhra (1988)
- Zakhmi Aurat (1989)
- Chahat (1992)
- Rani Beti Raaj Kare Gi (1994)

== Awards ==
Niaz received his first Nigar Award for the movie Ehsaas (1972). As a story/dialogue/screenwriter, he won a record 15 Nigar Awards from 1972 to 1994 for both Urdu and Punjabi films.

== Death ==
Niaz had a heart attack in 2002. He died on 5 August 2002 at age 63, in London and was buried in Samanabad graveyard, Lahore.
