= Ehsaas (1972 film) =

1972 film

- احساس
- Directed by: Nazar-ul-Islam
- Screenplay by: Bashir Niaz
- Story by: Ibrahim Jalees
- Produced by: Ilyas Rashidi
- Starring: Nadeem; Shabnam; Qavi; Lehri; Rangeela; Agha Talish; Mumtaz; Sofia Bano; Jalil Afghani
- Cinematography: Masoodur Rehman
- Music by: Robin Ghosh
- Production company: Rooni Films
- Release date: 22 December 1972
- Country: Pakistan
- Language: Urdu

Ehsaas is a 1972 Pakistani Urdu film directed by Nazar-ul-Islam. The lead cast included Nadeem, Shabnam, Qavi, Lehri, and Rangeela. The film won 3 Nigar Awards in the best actor, director, and screenwriter categories.

== Cast ==
- Nadeem
- Shabnam
- Qavi
- Lehri
- Rangeela
- Agha Talish
- Ajmal
- Sentosh Russal
- Mumtaz
- Sofia Bano
- Jalil Afghani

== Music and soundtracks ==
The playback music of Ehsaas was composed by Robin Ghosh. The lyrics were penned by Suroor Barabankvi and Akhtar Yousuf:

- Aap Ka Husn Jo Dekha To Khuda Yaad Aya... Singer(s): Mehdi Hassan
- Aap Ka Husn Jo Dekha To Khuda Yaad Aya... Singer(s): Runa Laila
- Allah Allah, Meri Mehfil Mein Woh Mehman Aya... Singer(s): Runa Laila, Ahmad Rushdi
- Bheegi Bheegi, Thandi Hawa, Jhuki Jhuk Urti Ghata, Mousam Hay Deevana... Singer(s): Runa Laila, Masood Rana
- Hamen Kho Kar Buhat Pachhtao Gay... Singer(s): Runa Laila
- Ik Din Kaya Hua, Waqt Tha Subha Ka... Singer(s): Runa Laila
- Ruk Jao, Abhi Mat Jao... Singer(s): Ahmad Rushdi, Shehnaz Begum

== Release and box office ==
Ehsaas was released on 22 December 1972. It was a silver jubilee hit that completed 31 weeks at the main theater.

== Awards ==
| Year | Film | Award | Category | Awardee | Ref. |
|---|---|---|---|---|---|
| 1972 | Ehsaas | Nigar Award | Best actor | Nadeem | |
| 1972 | Ehsaas | Nigar Award | Best director | Nazar-ul-Islam | |
| 1972 | Ehsaas | Nigar Award | Best Script writer | Bashir Niaz | |
