= Shabnam =

Bangladeshi–Pakistani film actress

- شبنم; শবনম
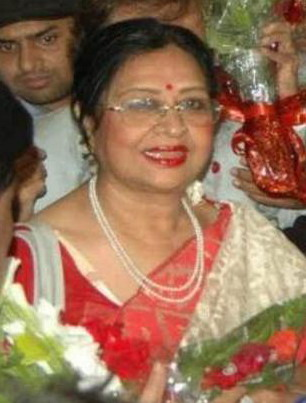
- Pronunciation: [ʃəbnəm]
- Born: Jharna Basak; 17 August 1946 (age 80); Dacca, Bengal, British India
- Citizenship: Pakistani (until 1999); Bangladeshi
- Occupation: Actress
- Years active: 1961–present
- Spouse: Robin Ghosh (m. 1964; died 2016)
- Relatives: Badal Ghosh (brother-in-law)
- Awards: 13 Nigar Awards; Lux Style Lifetime Achievement Award (2019); Lifetime Achievement Award from Pakistan Television (2012); Sitara-i-Imtiaz from the President of Pakistan (2024)

Jharna Basak (Note: Bengali pronunciation: [d͡ʒʱɔɾna bɔʃak].) (born 17 August 1946), known by her stage name Shabnam, (Note: Urdu pronunciation: [ʃəbnəm]; Bengali pronunciation: [ʃɔbnɔm].) is a Bangladeshi–Pakistani stage and film actress. Actor Waheed Murad introduced her to the Pakistani film industry by offering her a lead role in his film Samundar in 1968. Shabnam remained active in Lollywood in the 1960s, 1970s, and 1980s. She has been nominated for Nigar awards several times, winning it 13 times (the most for an actress). She has appeared in over 150 films. She was a leading actress in the Pakistani film industry for 28 years.

Shabnam migrated from East to West Pakistan in 1968, and lived in the country until the late 1990s; later she returned to her native Bangladesh.

== Early life ==
Shabnam was born on 17 August 1946 in Dhaka, in the erstwhile British India in a Bengali Hindu family. Her father was Nani Basak, a football referee from Dhaka. As a young girl, she was more adventurous and tomboyish in nature in comparison to her sister, who was into singing. She would still practice dance moves. She was offered a role in a movie as a supporting dancer, thus beginning her career in arts.

== Career ==
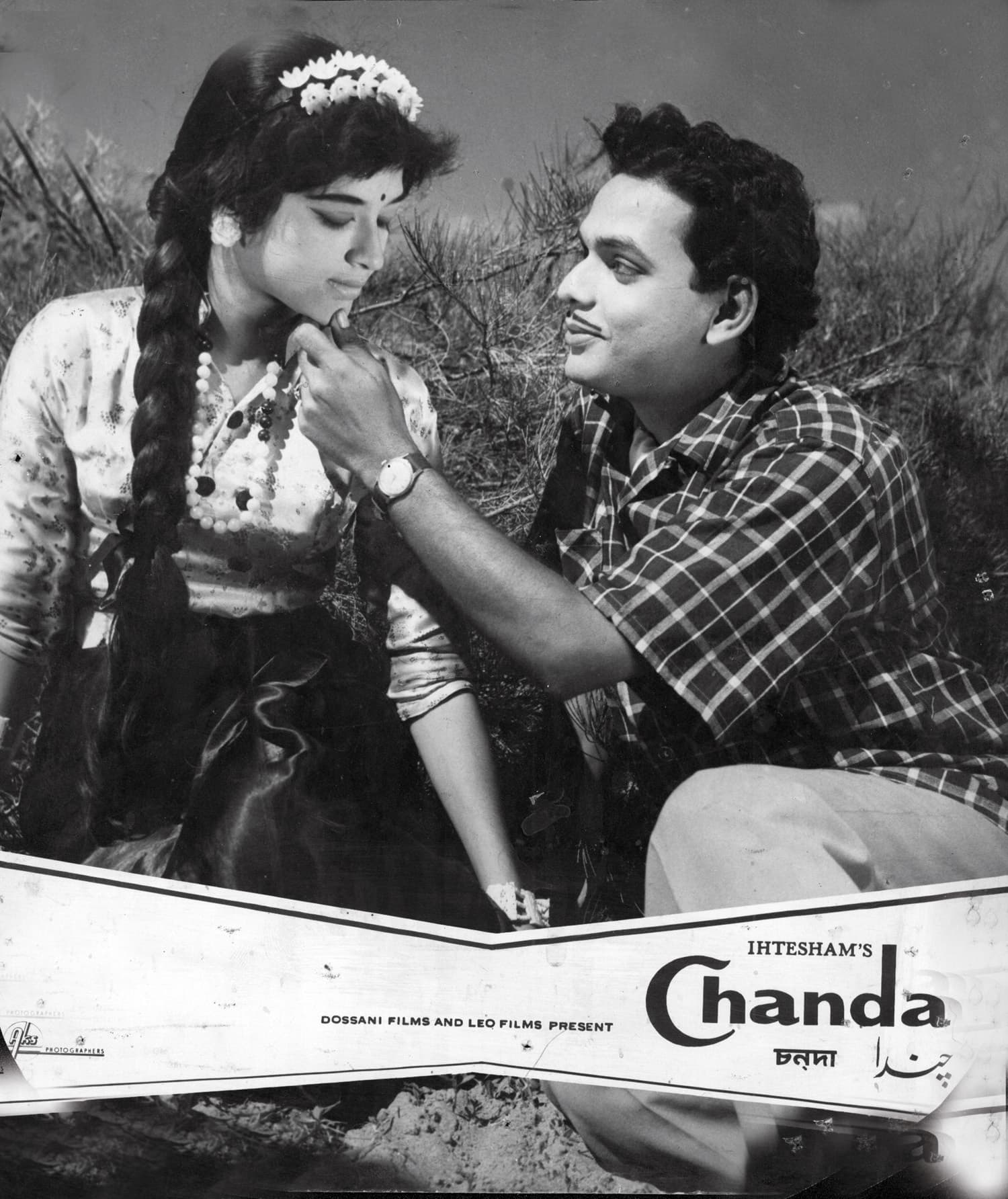
Shabnam on the film poster of Chanda (1962), directed by Ehtesham

Shabnam began her career when her father got her admitted into the Bulbul Lalitakala Academy. A close friend of her father got her a role in a dance sequence in the movie "Ei Desh Tomar Amar". Her next role was as a dancer in the movie "Rajdhanir Bukey". When the song became a hit, the audience requested that she be cast as a lead actress. That was when she starred in her Bengali debut film as a heroine, Harano Din.

Shabnam moved to West Pakistan after the director Ehtesham cast her in his Urdu movie Chanda in the erstwhile West Pakistan. Since her Urdu wasn't that proficient at that point in time, the rehearsals were scripted in Bengali. The music of this film was composed by her husband Robin Ghosh. The film turned out to be a hit, starting her career in the top ranks of the Pakistan film industry.

After starring in dozens of super-hit films, Shabnam became the number one reigning actress in Pakistan by the early 1970s. She retained that position until the mid-1980s, when she slowly started to retire. She is considered to probably be the only film actress in the world to have continuously and successfully played the romantic lead in films for almost three decades, from the early 1960s to the late 1980s.

After the Bangladesh Liberation War had ended, Shabnam wanted to visit her native homeland. It took her two years to get the "No Objection Certificate" which was required for her to get a Bangladeshi visa. It was later revealed that Lollywood had requested the Foreign Ministry of Pakistan to not give her a visa, as they feared she would not return from Bangladesh. Nevertheless, she reassured her fans and colleagues that she would not abandon Pakistan, and would be back after visiting her parents. Only then did the Foreign Ministry let her leave Pakistan, making sure their most popular actress would not leave. Around 1988, she switched on to character acting and was again doing films in her native Dhaka and Lahore. Since 1987 she made London her place of residence. Shabnam left Pakistan and its film industry in the late 1990s. She gracefully retired and moved to Bangladesh in 1997. According to her, she retired because of her age, and her duty to look after her parents, as they were entering their last years. She planned on retiring after her super-hit blockbuster film Aaina. But because of the overwhelming number of fans and offers she had in Pakistan, it took her 20 years to finish her last films, and then enter retirement.

After returning to Dhaka and taking a break for 2 years, Shabnam lastly performed in movie 'Ammajan,’ directed by Kazi Hayat. She performed in that movie in the central role and it was released in 1999. The film went on to be a super-hit and one of the most successful movies in Bangladeshi film history.

In 2012, Shabnam visited Pakistan along with her husband after 13 years, where they were awarded lifetime achievement award by the Pakistani government. The award ceremony was organized by PTV. The function was hosted by prominent actress and television presenter Bushra Ansari. The function included live interviews of she and her husband, along with famous singers and co-artists of the duo. Many of Shabnam's and Robin Ghosh's songs were performed on stage by young Pakistani artists. The show was attended by top members of the Pakistani community, most notably the then Prime Minister of Pakistan, Yousaf Raza Gillani.

23 of her Urdu movies celebrated diamond jubilees in Lollywood. Shabnam was the heroine among 12 of those movies. Shabnam won 13 Nigar Awards for best actress, which is a record to date.

In 2017, Shabnam announced that she would be returning to the Pakistani entertainment industry with television series Mohini Mansion Ki Cinderellayain, which is directed by Ali Tahir, and its music is composed by Sahir Ali Bagga. She is also committed to star in Aina 2, a sequel to her 1977 film Aina, which will be directed by Syed Noor.

== Personal life ==
Shabnam married music composer Robin Ghosh in 1966. They had one son. Robin Ghosh died on 13 February 2016 in Dhaka, due to respiratory failures. In an interview, she described him as a loving, caring and very understanding person who never interfered in her film life and never asked questions when she came home late from work. After retirement from the film industry, she used to take care of her parents and her husband, until their deaths. She now leads a retired life as a housewife, in Dhaka.

== 1978 assault ==
Farooq Bandial, a politician from Punjab's Khushab district and the cousin of Umar Ata Bandial, along with other four men committed armed dacoity at the residence of Robin Ghosh and Shabnam in Gulberg area of Lahore on 13 May 1978. A Special Military Court handed Bandial and four other men death sentences for committing armed dacoity. Farooq Bandial's uncle Fateh Khan Bandial was then a secretary in the federal government. He used his influences and the accused were later commuted by General Muhammad Zia-ul-Haq after Robin Ghosh and Shabnam granted them a pardon, and it was later changed to a life sentence. Bhandial joined Imran Khan's PTI in 2018, but was expelled the same day after news of his involvement in the dacoity re-surfaced. S.M. Zafar served as the legal counsel for Robin Ghosh and Shabnam in their case. The details of the case were recounted in detail in his book Mere Mashhoor Muqaddamay (My Popular Cases).

== Filmography ==
Shabnam worked in a total of 170 films, including 152 Urdu films, 14 Bengali and 4 Punjabi films. Her unreleased films include: Gharonda, Bunjarun and Itna Pyar Kon Karay. Her debut film was a Bengali film. Her first Urdu film, Chanda (1962 film) was filmed in Bangladesh.

Year	Title	Role	Director	Notes	Ref(s)
1959	E Desh Tomar Amar				
1961	Rajdhanir Bukey		Ehtesham		
1961	Harano Din		Mustafiz		
1961	Kakhono Asheni		Zahir Raihan		
1962	Azaan		Fazal Haq		
1962	Chanda		Ehtesham		
1963	Talash		Mustafiz		
1963	Naach Ghar		Abdul Jabbar Khan		
1963	Preet Na Jane Reet		M. Chaudhury		
1964	Karwan		S. M. Parvez		
1964	Paisay		Mustafiz		
1965	Aakhri Station		Suroor Barabankvi		
1965	Kaise Kahun		S. Khan		
1965	Kajal	Rita / Chanchal	Nazar-ul-Islam		
1965	Saagar		Ehtesham		
1966	Begana		S. M. Parvez		
1966	Raja Sanyasi		Khan Ataur Rahman		
1967	Darshan		Rehman		
1968	Jahan Tum Wahan Hum		Pervez Malik		
1968	Main Zinda Hoon		M. Salim		
1968	Samandar		Rafiq Rizvi		
1968	Shareek-e-Hayat		S. M. Yusuf		
1968	Tum Mere Ho		Suroor Barabankvi		
1969	Aasra		Raza Mir		
1969	Anari		Mustafiz		
1969	Andaleeb		Farid Ahmed		
1969	Daagh		Ehtesham		
1969	Joar Bhata		Attaur Rahman		
1969	Ladla		A. H. Siddiqui		
1969	Naz		Sharif Nayyar		
1969	Nazneen		Khalid Khurshid		
1969	Qasam Uss Waqt Ki		A. J. Kardar		
1970	Chalo Maan Gayai		Rahman		
1970	Jale Na Kyun Parwana		Shaukat Hashmi		
1970	Naseeb Apna Apna		Qamar Zaidi		
1970	Naya Savera		Jamil Akhter		
1970	Shama Aur Parwana		Hassan Tariq		
1971	Afshan		Javed Hashmi		
1971	Chiragh Kahan Roshni Kahan		K. Kurshid		
1971	Dosti		Sharif Nayyar		
1971	Rootha Na Karo		Munawar Rasheed		
1972	Bandagi				
1972	Ehsaas				
1972	Mann Ki Jeet				
1972	Mere Hamsafar				
1973	Anmol				
1973	Badal Aur Bijli				
1973	Gharana				
1973	Nya Raasta				
1973	Naam Ke Nawab				
1973	Society				
1973	Zakhmi				
1973	Aas				
1974	Aina Aur Soorat				
1974	Bano Rani				
1974	Chahat				
1974	Dhamaka				
1974	Dillagi				
1974	Do Badan				
1974	Do Tasviren				
1974	Intezar				
1974	Main Bani Dulhan				
1974	Miss Hippy				
1974	Qismat				
1974	Sawan Aya Tum Nahin Aye				
1974	Sharafat				
1974	Aabroo				
1975	Anari				
1975	Badal Gaya Insaan				
1975	Be-misal				
1975	Bikhrey Moti				
1975	Dil Nasheen				
1975	Do Saathi				
1975	Jageer				
1975	Farz Aur Mamta				
1975	Milap				
1975	Paisa				
1975	Pehchan	Sara	Pervaiz Malik		
1975	Umang				
1975	Zanjeer				
1975	Zeenat				
1976	Anokhi				
1976	Daman Ki Aag				
1976	Do Aansoo				
1976	Daag				
1976	Mom Ki Guria				
1976	Raja Jani				
1976	Sachai				
1976	Sayyan Anari				
1976	Talash				
1976	Tallaq				
1976	Aaj Aur Kal				
1977	Aina		Nazar-ul-Islam		
1977	Mere Huzoor				
1977	Naya Suraj				
1977	Sangam				
1977	Shama-e-Mohabbat				
1977	Uff Yeh Bivian				
1978	Abhi To Mein Jawan Hun				
1978	Achhey Mian				
1978	Ankhon Ankhon Mein				
1978	Anmol Mohabbat				
1978	Awaz				
1978	Intekhab				
1978	Milan				
1978	Saheli				
1978	Aabshar				
1979	Chalte Chalte				
1979	Nazr-e-Karam				
1979	Nishani				
1979	Pakeeza				
1979	Naya Andaaz				
1980	Azmaish				
1980	Badaltey Mousam				
1980	Bandish		Nazar-ul-Islam		
1980	Hum Dono				
1980	Nahin Abhi Nahin				
1980	Pyari				
1980	Rishta				
1981	Faaslay				
1981	Ghaerao				
1981	Kiran Aur Kali				
1981	Qurbani				
1981	Tange Wali				
1982	Biwi Ho To Aisi				
1982	I Love You				
1982	Khoobsoorat				
1982	Naseeb				
1982	Saharey				
1982	Zara Si Baat				
1982	Aahat				
1983	Deewangi				
1983	Dehleez				
1983	Gumnam				
1983	Kabhi Alwida Na Kehna				
1983	Maang Meri Bhar Do				
1983	Aaj Ki Raat				
1984	Aisa Bhi Hota Hai				
1984	Andhi Aur Toofan				
1984	Barood				
1984	Doorian				
1984	Kamyabi				
1984	Lazawal				
1984	Naseebon Wali				
1984	Naam Mera Badnam				
1984	Shadi Magar Adhi				
1984	Tere Ghar Ke Samne				
1985	Benazir Qurbani				
1985	Naraz				
1986	Faisla				
1986	Jhoomar Chor				
1986	Shadi Mere Shohar Ki				
1987	Bazi				
1987	Kaloo				
1987	Love in Nepal				
1987	Malka				
1987	Masti Khan				
1987	Saas Meri Saheli				
1987	Teri Banhon Mein				
1988	Sheesh Nagin				
1988	Jogajog	Julekha Chowdhury			
1989	Lady Commando				
1993	Ranjish				
1994	Rani Beti Raj Karegi				
1995	Awargi				
1996	Saza				
1997	Aulad Ki Qasam				
1999	Ammajan				

== Tributes and honours ==
In 2017, actress Saba Qamar paid tribute to Shabnam by performing on one of her song at the annual Lux Style Awards ceremony.
