= Aina (1977 film) =

1977 film

- Directed by: Nazar-ul-Islam
- Written by: Bashir Niaz
- Produced by: Rauf Ahmed Shamsi
- Starring: Shabnam; Nadeem; Rehan; Bahar Begum; Nimmo; Shahzeb (child actor); Qavi Khan (guest actor)
- Cinematography: Afzal Chaudhry
- Edited by: Irshad Durrani
- Music by: Robin Ghosh
- Release date: 18 March 1977
- Running time: 147 minutes
- Country: Pakistan
- Language: Urdu

Aina (Urdu: آئینہ, lit. 'The Mirror') is a 1977 Pakistani romantic drama film directed by Nazar-ul-Islam and starring Nadeem and Shabnam. Singers are Mehdi Hassan, Mehnaz, Nayyara Noor, and Alamgir. The film was a major box-office success primarily due to its music, which was composed by Robin Ghosh. It became the longest-running Pakistani film at the cinemas. The film was a remake of a Hindi film Aa Gale Lag Jaa starring Shashi Kapoor and Sharmila Tagore. The movie went on to be remade in Hindi in 1985 as Pyar Jhukta Nahin.

At the annual Nigar Awards, the film received 12 awards, including, best film, best director, best actor, best actress, and best supporting actress, and best playback singer. It topped the British Film Institute's users' poll of "Top ten Pakistani films of all times" in 2002.

== Plot ==
Aina is a love story of two hearts and two souls but from two different social classes, one being the daughter of a business tycoon, i.e., Rita (Shabnam), and one being a realistic, self-confident, and a little bit arrogant poor young man, Iqbal (Nadeem). Rita is a leisure girl, whereas Nadeem works as a hotel receptionist, and they both fall in love. The entire movie is about how a rich girl and a poor man fell in love and the struggles that came after their marriage.

== Cast ==
- Shabnam as Rita
- Nadeem Baig as Iqbal
- Bahar Begum as Rita's mother
- Shahzeb as Rita & Iqbal's son
- Rehan as Seth Sahab (Rita's father)
- Qavi Khan
- Zarqa As dancer
- Rehana as Begum
- Khalid Saleem Mota as Mota
- Ragni as iqbal'mother
- Mukhtar Begum as Dadi
- Nimmo
- Nazir Ahmed Khan as Seth

== Soundtrack ==
The film was a musical success as well and has trademark song visualizations from director Nazar-ul-Islam. The music was composed by Robin Ghosh, and the playback singers were Mehdi Hassan, Mehnaz, Alamgir, Nayyara Noor, and Akhlaq Ahmed. The theme song is "Mujhe dil se na bhulana", sung in a happy or sad mood and another song version sung by the child star at the climax of the movie. And the lyrics were written by Tasleem Fazli.

- Kabhi Mai Sochta Houn...by Mehdi Hassan
- Wada Karo Saajna...by Mehnaz and Alamgir
- Mujhe Dil Se Na Bhulana (happy version)...by Mehnaz and Alamgir
- Haseen Wadion Se Yeh Pucho...by Akhlaq Ahmed and Nayyara Noor
- Ruthey Ho Tum Tumko Kaisay Manaun Piya...by Nayyara Noor
- Mujhe Dil Se Na Bhulana (sad version)...by Mehdi Hassan
- Mujhe Dil Se Na Bhulana (child version)...by Nayyara Noor

== Release and reception ==
Aina was released on 18 March 1977 in Pakistani cinemas. In Karachi, it was released in two main cinemas, Bambino and Scala.

Aina is Pakistan's only Urdu film to have a crown jubilee (a mega-hit film) with a total running period of 401 weeks on all cinemas and 48 weeks on the main cinema in Karachi. The film had broken all the previous box office records, and no Pakistani film has touched that record again till date.

Mushtaq Gazdar, a well-known film critic, in his book 'Pakistan Cinema 1947 - 1997', Oxford University Press, 1997, said:

"In Aina, Nazrul infused a romantic note through the songs, using the elements of nature as tools to enhance their impact. His use of open spaces to create the mood of the scenes in contrast with the normal lip-sync presentation of songs greatly appealed to the audience."

This movie was so popular that it was shown in Karachi Cinemas for almost 8 consecutive years (401 consecutive weeks). The film ran to packed crowds in theatres across China as well. In the 1990s, it was telecast on Bangladesh Television.

In 2002, the film topped the users' poll of "Top ten Pakistani films" conducted by the British Film Institute. The film was also ranked among the critics' polls of the institute.

== Awards ==
One of its songs "Mujhay dil se na bhulana...", sung by Mehdi Hassan, won the Nigar Award for the best song of the year 1977. In total, the film won 12 awards:

Award	Awardee
Best Movie for the year 1977	Producer: M. Ahmed Shamsi
Best Director	Nazar-ul-Islam
Best Dialogues/Screenplay	ٌٌٌٌBashir Niaz
Best Actress	Shabnam
Best Actor	Nadeem
Best Supporting Actor	Rehan
Best Musician	Robin Ghosh
Best songwriter-lyricist	Tasleem Fazli (for the song: "Mujhe dil se na bhulana...")
Best photography/cinematography	Afzal Chaudhry
Best playback singer	Mehdi Hassan (for the song: "Mujhe dil se na bhulana...")
Best upcoming singer	Alamgir (for the song: "Wada karo saajna...")
Special award	Shahzeb (child star)

== Remakes and possible sequel ==
The 1998 Pakistani film Nikah, directed by Sangeeta, was loosely based on Aina. Another remake was made in 2013 with the same name, which starred Faisal Qureshi, Saba Qamar, directed by Sarmad Sultan Khoosat and produced by A & B Entertainment.

In April 2017, director Syed Noor announced a sequel to the film, tentatively known as Aina 2. Noor told The Express Tribune, "Of course, Aina 2 will further the story told in Aina with the original star cast members as well as some new faces. Also, we’re planning on filming it in Canada this time."
