= Nayyara Noor =

Pakistani playback singer (1950–2022)

- نیرہ نور
- Born: 19 October 1950; Guwahati, Assam, India
- Died: 20 August 2022 (aged 71); Karachi, Sindh, Pakistan
- Occupation: Playback singer
- Years active: 1971–2012
- Known for: Ghazal singing
- Title: Bulbul-e-Pakistan
- Awards: Pride of Performance (2006); Nigar Award (1973)

Nayyara Noor (Note: Urdu: نیرہ نور, Urdu pronunciation: [nɛːɾɑ nuːɾ]; Assamese: নাইয়াৰা নূৰ, Assamese pronunciation: [nai̯̯aɹa nuɹ].) (Urdu: نیرہ نور, Assamese: নাইয়াৰা নূৰ; 19 October 1950 – 20 August 2022) was a Pakistani playback singer, who was considered one of the country's most popular singers. She was known for performing in live ghazal singing concerts in Pakistani TV shows and in concert halls around the country.

== Early life ==
Nayyara Noor was born on 19 October 1950 in Guwahati, Assam. Her family and ancestors belonged to a merchant class and had their roots in Amritsar, Punjab. Her father was an active member of the All-India Muslim League and had hosted Pakistan's founding father Muhammad Ali Jinnah during his trip to Assam before the Partition of India in 1947.

In 1957 or 1958, Noor, along with her mother and siblings, migrated from India to Pakistan, settling in Karachi. However, her father stayed back in Assam until 1993 to look after the family's immovable properties.

== Career ==
As a child, Nayyara is said to have been inspired by the bhajans of Kanan Devi and Kamla as well as the ghazals and thumris of Begum Akhtar. Although Nayyara had no formal musical background nor formal training, she was discovered by Professor Asrar Ahmad at the Islamia College in Lahore when he heard her sing the Lata Mangeshkar bhajan "Jo tum todo piya" from Jhanak Jhanak Payal Baaje for her friends and teachers at an annual dinner at the National College of Arts in Lahore in 1968. Soon thereafter, she was asked to sing for the university's Radio Pakistan programs.

In 1971, Nayyara made her public singing debut in Pakistani television serials and then beginning with films such as Gharana (1973) and Tansen. She went on to sing ghazals, a form of Urdu poetry, penned by the famous poets such as Ghalib and Faiz Ahmad Faiz and performed with legends such as Mehdi Hassan and Ahmed Rushdi.

In 2012, Nayyara Noor officially announced that she would no longer sing professionally. After her marriage, she maintained that her primary roles were those of a wife and a mother. She said that music was a passion with her but never her top priority.

Nayyara performed at mehfils and mushairas, having cemented a following among ghazal lovers in Pakistan and India. Probably the most famous ghazal of hers was "Ae Jazba-e-Dil Gar Main Chahoon", written by Behzad Lucknavi. She later won many awards for this ghazal.

== Awards and recognition ==
Year	Award	Category	Result	Work	Ref.
1973	Nigar Awards	Best playback female singer	Won	Gharana (film)	
2006	Pride of Performance	Arts	Won	Life time achievement	

- Three Gold Medal Awards at the annual All Pakistan Music Conference concerts

== Discography ==
=== Non-film songs/ghazals ===
She was a versatile singer; the following are some of the ghazals she recorded:

Song title	Lyrics by	Music by
"Ae Jazba e Dil Gar Main Chahun, Har Cheez Muqabil Aajaye"	Behzad Lucknavi	
"Aaj Bazaar Main Pabajaulan Chalo"	Faiz Ahmad Faiz	
"Woh Jo Hum Mein Tum Mein Qarar Tha Tumhein Yaad Ho Keh Na Yaad Ho"	Momin Khan Momin	
"Rang barsaat nay bharay kuchh tou"	Nasir Kazmi	
"Phir sawan ruth ki pawan chali tum yaad aaei"	Nasir Kazmi	
"Aye ishq hamay barbaad na kar"	Akhtar Sheerani	Khalil Ahmed
"Barkha Barsay Chhat Per, Mein Teray Sapnay Deikhuun"	Faiz Ahmad Faiz	
"Intesaab"	Faiz Ahmad Faiz	
"Kabhi Hum Bhi Khoobssorat Thay"	Ahmed Shamim; for the PTV drama series Teesra Kinara	
"Jalay tau jalao gori"	Ibn-e-Insha	
"Hum Kay Thehray Ajnabi"	Faiz Ahmad Faiz	

=== Notable film songs ===
Song title	Lyrics by	Music by	Film and year
"Tera Saaya Jahan Bhi Ho Sajana, Palkain Bichha Duun"	Kaleem Usmani	M. Ashraf	Gharana (1973)
"Aaj Gham Hai Tau Kya, Woh Din Bhi Zaroor Aaeiga, Jab Tera Gham Khushi Mein Badal Jaaega"	Khawaja Pervaiz	Kamal Ahmad	Mastana (1973)
"Roothay Ho Tum, Tumko Kaisay Manauun Piya, Bolo Na"	Taslim Fazli	Robin Ghosh	Aina (1977)
"Mujhay Dil Sey Na Bhulana, Chaahay Rokay Zamana"	Taslim Fazli	Robin Ghosh	Aina (1977)
"Iss Parcham Kay Saaey Talay Hum Eik Hain"	Kaleem Usmani	M. Ashraf	Farz Aur Mamta (1975)
"Bol Ree Gurrya Bol"	Masroor Anwar	Nisar Bazmi	Aas (1973)
"Too Hee Bata, Pagli Pawan"	Masroor Anwar	M. Ashraf	Phool Mere Gulshan Ka (1974)
"Itna Bhi Na Chaho Mujhe"			Parda Na Uthao (1974)
"Tera pyar bun kay Aaye"		Robin Ghosh	Bhool (1974)
"Mausum tau diwana hai"			Dou saathi (1975)
"Kuchh loag mohabbat ka sila"		Nashaad	Gumrah (1975)
"Toot Gaya Sapna"		Karim Shahabuddin	Bobby and Julie (1978)

== Personal life ==
She was married to Shehryar Zaidi. Her younger son Jaffer Zaidi is the lead vocalist of Kaavish music band, while the older son Naad-e-Ali has started his career as a solo singer.

== Death ==
She died on 20 August 2022 in Karachi after a brief illness at the age of 71.
