= Nazar-ul-Islam =

Pakistani film director (1939–1994)

- Born: 1939; Calcutta, India
- Died: 11 January 1994 (aged 54–55); Lahore, Pakistan
- Occupations: Director; filmmaker
- Years active: 1966 – 1994
- Awards: Won 4 Nigar Awards during his career

Nazar-ul-Islam (1939 – 11 January 1994) was a Pakistani film director known for his movies like, Ehsaas (1972), Sharafat (1974), Aina (1977), and Bandish (1980). His son Imran Islam has been a television actor and producer.

== Early life ==
Nazar-ul-Islam was born in Calcutta in 1939 and later migrated to East Pakistan (now Bangladesh). In 1971, after the separation of East Pakistan, he settled in Lahore, Pakistan.

== Career ==
Nazar-ul-Islam started his career as a film editor in the 1960s in Dhaka. He directed his first Urdu movie, "Kajal" in 1965. His other notable Urdu movie in Dhaka was, "Piyasa"(1969). After 1971, he became the most successful film director of Lollywood in the decades of 1970s and 1980s. His successful films include: Ehsaas (1972), Sharafat (1974), Ambar (1979), Bandish (1980), Nahin Abhi Nahin (1980), Do Deewane (1982), and Kalay Chor (1991). Nazar-ul-Islam brought a realistic approach to filmmaking and experimented with new themes for Urdu movies.

His movie, "Aina"(1977) became a record-setting mega-hit in the history of Pakistani cinema. It ran for a total of 401 weeks after being released on 18 March 1977.

== Filmography ==
Nazar-ul-Islam directed 30 Urdu, Bengali, and Punjabi films. Some of his popular movies are:

- 1965: Kajal (Urdu)
- 1970: Darpochurno (Bengali)
- 1971: Shorolipi (Bengali)
- 1972: Ehsaas (Urdu)
- 1974: Sharafat (Urdu)
- 1974: Haqeeqat (Urdu)
- 1977: Aaina (Urdu)
- 1978: Amber (Urdu)
- 1978: Zindagi (Urdu)
- 1980: Bandish (Urdu)
- 1980: Nahin Abhi Nahin (Urdu)
- 1982: Aangan (Urdu)
- 1983: Love Story (Urdu)
- 1985: Deewanay Do (Urdu)
- 1985: Palkon Ki Chhaon Mein (Urdu)
- 1985: Zamin Aasman (Urdu)
- 1989: Madam Bawari (Punjabi)
- 1989: Barood Ki Chhaon Mein (Urdu)
- 1991: Kalay Chor (Punjabi)

== Awards ==
Nazar-ul-Islam received 4 'Best Director' Nigar awards for the following movies:

Year	Film	Award	Category	Awardee	Ref.
1972	Ehsaas	Nigar Award	Best Director	Nazar-ul-Islam	
1974	Sharafat	Nigar Award	Best director	Nazar-ul-Islam	
1977	Aina	Nigar Award	Best Director	Nazar-ul-Islam	

- Madam Bawari (1989) (Best Director - Punjabi-language film of 1989)

== Death ==
Nazar-ul-Islam died on 11 January 1994, and was buried in Lahore, Pakistan.

== See also ==
List of Pakistani film directors
