= Mehnaz Begum =

Pakistani singer

- Born: 1958; Mahmudabad, Uttar Pradesh, India
- Died: 19 January 2013 (aged 55); Manama, Bahrain
- Occupations: Singer, film playback singer
- Years active: 1972–2013
- Parent: Kajjan Begum (mother)
- Awards: 13 Nigar Awards; Lux Style Award (Lifetime Achievement Award) (2011)

Mehnaz Begum (Urdu: مہناز بیگم; 1958 – 19 January 2013) was a Pakistani singer, known for her work during the 1970s and 1980s. Recipient of several Nigar Awards, her career spanned across radio, television, and playback singing.

== Early life ==
Mehnaz was born at Mahmudabad, Uttar Pradesh, India in 1958. Her family migrated to Pakistan in the late 1950s. She received her initial training in music from her mother Kajjan Begum who was also a singer.

== Career ==
Mehnaz started her career as a playback singer in the early 1970s. Saleem Gilani, the director general of Radio Pakistan, Karachi first spotted her doing a concert at her college and helped develop her singing career. Mehdi Hassan and his elder brother Pandit Ghulam Qadir trained her at the radio station for about a month. Her melodious voice, musical training and control over her voice made her popular among the Pakistani film music directors.

She sang a variety of genres but specialized in ghazal, thumri, dadra, khayal, drupad and reciting salam, noha and marsiya. She was the daughter of celebrated sub-continental singer Kajjan Begum. and the famous government officer Abdullah Abdullah Tasnim, but when she gained fame, she changed her name to simply Mehnaz or Mehnaz Begum. She also sang ghazals and light classical music for Pakistani television shows

== Personal life ==
Mehnaz never married. Some of her favorite hobbies included bird-watching and admiring nature. Her favorite television show and movie were Franklin (life of a turtle named Franklin), and Bambi (1942 animated movie), respectively. Mehnaz loved to paint in her college days and wanted to choose painting as her career. She also delighted in drawing various flowers and birds.

== Discography ==
=== Film ===
Song title	Lyrics by	Music by	Film notes
Mera Pyar Tere Jeevan Ke Sang Rahega	Masroor Anwar	Nisar Bazmi	Pehchan (1975 film)
Pyar Ka Waada Aisay Nibhaen, Koi Juda Karne Na Pai	Taslim Fazli	Khalil Ahmed	Aaj Aur Kal (1976)
Mujhe Dil Se Na Bhulana	Taslim Fazli	Robin Ghosh	Aina
Tere mere piyar ka aisa naata hai	Riaz Arshad	Kamal Ahmed	Salakhein (1977)
Jaisi Tasveer Banai Hai Mere Saajan Ne	Taslim Fazli	Wajid Nashad	Parastish (1977 film)
Mein Jis Din Bhula Doon Tera Pyar Sajna	Masroor Anwar	M. Ashraf	Khushboo (1979)
Do Pyaasay Dil Aik Huay Hain Aise	Taslim Fazli	Robin Ghosh	Bandish
Sachha Tera Naam, Tu Hi Bigre Banai Kaam	Masroor Anwar	Nisar Bazmi	Biwi Ho Tau Aisi (1982 film)

=== Radio ===
Song title	Lyrics by
Ae Meri Sar Zameen e Watan	
Lutf Woh Ishq Mein	Dagh Dehlvi
Har Cheez Hai Mehve Khudnomai	Muhammad Iqbal

=== TV ===
Song title	Lyrics by	Music
Kajrari Ankhiyon Mein Nindya Na Aye		Niaz Ahmed
Bichray Meet Ab Aan Milay Hein (Co-singer: Muhammad Ifrahim)	Shabi Farooqui	Sohail Rana
Naina Jaagte Rehna	Hafeez Jalandhari	Sohail Rana
Jayon Main Kahan		Sohail Rana

== Death ==
She died on 19 January 2013 at a Bahrain hospital while transiting from Karachi to Miami, Florida for medical treatment of a respiratory ailment. Her condition worsened during the flight and during a stopover at the Bahrain airport, she was taken to a hospital where she died. Mehnaz was laid to rest at Wadi-e-Hussain graveyard in Sohrab Goth Karachi.

== Awards and recognition ==
- She had won the Nigar Award for Best Female Playback Singer 13 times
- Lifetime Achievement Award by Lux Style Awards (2011)
