= M. Ashraf =

Pakistani film music director

- ایم اشرف
- Born: Muhammad Ashraf; 1 February 1942; Lahore, Punjab, British India
- Died: 4 February 2007 (aged 65) at Karachi, Sindh, Pakistan
- Occupations: Composer & music director for films
- Years active: 1961 – 2005
- Relatives: M. Arshad (son) (also a music director); Ustad Tafu (cousin); Master Inayat Hussain (maternal uncle or 'Mamu')
- Awards: Won 6 Nigar Awards during his career Won 14 Graduate Awards of the Pakistani film industry during his career

M. Ashraf or Muhammad Ashraf (1 February 1942 – 4 February 2007) was a Pakistani film composer.

In the early 1960s, he first started as one member of the music directors duo of Manzoor – Ashraf in the Pakistan film industry.

By the end of his 45 years long career, he had composed more than 2,000 film songs for over 400 films.

== Early life and career ==
Muhammad Ashraf was born in Lahore, British India inside the Bhati Gate area in 1942. M. Ashraf got music lessons from his 'Nana' (maternal grandfather who also happened to be a 'Mamu' (uncle) of veteran Pakistani music director Master Inayat Hussain (1916 – 26 March 1993). M. Ashraf first assisted his 'Mamu' (uncle) music director Akhtar Hussain Akhian for five years. He belonged to a known family of musicians in Pakistan with Ustad Tafu also being his cousin.

He started his film career with a teammate Master Manzoor with (1959 film Savera hit song "Tu jo nahin hay tau kuchh bhi nahin hay") sung by playback singer S. B. John. Film Saperan (1961) was another hit film and the song Chand Sa Mukhra Gora Badan was another popular film song which gained singer Ahmed Rushdi his first Nigar Award. This way two-music-directors-team was created that went by the name Manzoor – Ashraf. Both musicians worked with each other from 1956 to 1967 and then M. Ashraf decided to go solo in 1967 with film Sajda (1967).

Manzoor Ashraf duo or team had musicians Master Manzoor and Muhammad Ashraf in it. Together, they composed music in 26 films in the 1960s. After separation from music director Master Manzoor, his first film as M Ashraf alone was Sajda in 1967. In the 1970s, he reached the peak of his film career and composed music for many big hit films. He continued his successful march in the 1980s despite the downfall of Urdu films and a dominance of Punjabi films. "M. Ashraf's musical journey ended with Tere Bin Jiya Na Jaye (2005).

== Playback singers introduced by him ==
Famous folk singer Shaukat Ali was introduced in film director Haidar Chodhary's inaugural super-hit musical film Tees Mar Khan in 1963. Naheed Akhtar was introduced by him in film Nanha Farisha in 1974 with the song: "Janey kyun dil tarapta rehta hay, Aao jee addi tappa gaen". Nayyara Noor actually had her first appearance in Punjabi film Ziddi (1973 film) but her first super-hit song was composed by M. Ashraf. Rajab Ali appeared in his film Yadein in 1971 with a popular duet song with Noor Jehan. Asad Amanat Ali Khan was introduced into the Pakistani film industry by M. Ashraf in film Saheli (1978).

M Ashraf set new records in Pakistan, working mainly with 5 major film playback singers of his time, namely with Noor Jehan, Mehdi Hassan, Naheed Akhtar, Masood Rana, and Ahmed Rushdi while also introducing new talent such as Ghulam Abbas, A. Nayyar, Alamgir, Mohammed Ali Shehki, Rajab Ali, Anwar Rafi and other upcoming new artists of that era to the broader audience of movies and pop radio airplays.

== Some of his popular songs ==
- "Tu Jo Nahin Hai, Tau Kuchh Bhi Nahin Hai" Sung by S. B. John, lyrics by Fayyaz Hashmi, film Savera (1959)
- "Chand Sa Mukhra Gora Badan, Jal Mein Lagaey Meethi Aggan" Sung by Ahmed Rushdi, lyrics by Shabab Kiranwi, film Saperan (1961)
  Playback singer Ahmed Rushdi won his first Nigar Award for this film song
- "Gole Gappay Wala Aaya, Gole Gappay Laaya" Sung by Ahmed Rushdi, lyrics by Hazeen Qadri, film Mehtab (1962)
- "Tum Hi Ho Mahboob Meray, Mein Kyuun Na Tumhein Pyaar Karoon" Sung by Masood Rana, lyrics by Khawaja Pervez, film Aina (1966)
- "Saamne Aake Tujh Ko Pukara Nahin, Teri Ruswai Mujhko Gawara Nahin" Sung by Mehdi Hassan, lyrics by Khawaja Pervez, film Dard (1968)
- Jab Koi Pyaar Se Bulaeye Ga, Tum Ko Eik Shaksh Yaad Aaye Ga Sung by Mehdi Hassan, lyrics by Khawaja Pervez, film Zindagi Kitni Haseen Hai (1969)
- "O' Mera Babu Chhaill Chhabeela Mein Tau Naachoon Gi" Sung by Runa Laila, lyrics by Taslim Fazli, film Munn Ki Jeet (1972)
- "Do Pattar Anaran De" Sung by Noor Jehan, lyrics by Khawaja Pervez, film Do Pattar Anaran De (1972)
- "Tera Saaya Jahan Bhi Ho Sajana Palkain Bichhaoon" Sung by Nayyara Noor, lyrics by Kaleem Usmani, film Gharana (1973)
- "Hamaray Dil Se Mat Khailo Khilona Toot Jaaye Ga" Sung by Mehdi Hassan, lyrics by Taslim Fazli, film Daman Aur Chingari (1973)
- "Meray Shauq Da Nahin Aetbar Teinun" Sung by Ghulam Ali, lyrics by Ghulam Mustafa Tabassum, film Eik Thi Larki (1973)
- "Tujhe Pyar Karte Karte Meri Umar Beet Jaaye" Sung by Mehdi Hassan, lyrics by Taslim Fazli, film Mera Naam Hai Mohabbat (1975)
- "Iss Parcham Kay Saaey Talay Hum Eik Hain" Sung by Nayyara Noor, lyrics by Kaleem Usmani, film Farz Aur Mamta (1975)
- "Socha Tha Mein Ne Dil Nahin Doon Gi, Hai Rabba O' Dil Dena Paya" Sung by Nahid Akhtar, lyrics by Taslim Fazli, film Anari (1975)
- "Be Iman Chahoon Tujhe Subah O Shaam" Sung by Mehdi Hassan, lyrics by Masroor Anwar, film Jab Jab Phool Khilay (1975)
- "Kitne din ke baad mile ho" sung by Ghulam Bass, film Apnay Huey Paraey (1976).
- "Babul Tau Duaen Deta Hai" Sung by Mehdi Hassan, lyrics by Taslim Fazli, film Baraat (1978)
- "Jo Dard Mila Apnaun Se Mila", Sung by Mehdi Hassan, lyrics by Taslim Fazli, film Shabana (1976)
- "Mera Laung Gawacha" Sung by Musarrat Nazir, lyrics by Khawaja Pervez, film Allah Rakha (1987)
- "Dopatta Mera Lal rang Da" (a bhangra song), Sung by Humaira Channa and Shazia Manzoor, lyrics by Saeed Gillani, film Munda Bigra Jaye (1995)

== Awards and recognition ==
- Won 6 Nigar Award for 'Best Music' in 6 different films - film Gharana (1973), film Mera Naam Hai Mohabbat (1975), film Shabana (1976), film Qurbani (1981), Punjabi-language films Dhee Rani (1985) and Qismet (1986).
- M. Ashraf also won 14 Graduate Awards of the Pakistan film industry.

== Death and legacy ==
M. Ashraf died of a cardiac arrest on 4 February 2007 in Karachi, Pakistan at the age of 65.

"He had the distinction of working with film directors such as S. Suleman, Nazrul Islam, M. Javed Fazil, Pervez Malik, Shamim Ara, Iqbal Akhtar, Jan Mohammad and Hasan Askari. And banking on his music, they all tasted success."

Even during M. Ashraf's lifetime and after his death, his son, M. Arshad has "emerged as a formidable musician" with hit films to his credit such as Bulandi (1990 film), Jeeva (1995 film), Dopatta Jal Raha Hai (1998 film), Jungle Queen (2000 film), Salakhain (2004 film). His two other sons are Nadeem Ashraf and Salman Ashraf.
