= Akhlaq Ahmed =

Pakistani playback singer (1946 - 1999)

Akhlaq Ahmed اخلاق احمد
- Born: 10 January 1946; Delhi, British India
- Died: 4 August 1999 (aged 53); London, United Kingdom
- Occupation: Playback singer of film songs
- Years active: 1973 – 1998
- Awards: Won 7 Nigar Awards during his career

Akhlaq Ahmed (Urdu: اخلاق احمد; 10 January 1946 – 4 August 1999) was a Pakistani film playback singer whose singing talent earned him fame in the late 1970s and 1980s.

== Early life and career ==
He was born in Delhi, British India in 1946 and started as a stage singer in the 1960s in Karachi, when he was a member of a famous singing group with two other artists, fellow singer Masood Rana and Nadeem, who gained much fame as a film actor. Akhlaq Ahmad was the third generation of male playback singers in the Pakistan film industry. He struggled for many years, but gained some recognition in the 1970s as a playback singer. The song "Sona Na Chandi Na Koi Mahal" in the film Bandish (1980), and "Sawan Aye Sawan Jaye" in the film Chahat (1974), are his big hit film songs. Both these songs were composed by music director Robin Ghosh. His song tally is under one hundred songs. Famous Indian singer Sonu Nigam sang many songs of Akhlaq Ahmed as Sonu's voice closely resembles Akhlaq's and released these songs in the late 1990s.

Earlier Akhlaq Ahmed had first started singing for friends at gatherings just for fun. He was later member of a famous singing group from Karachi with two other artists, film playback singer Masood Rana and film actor Nadeem. He initially started singing as a stage singer in the 1960s. Akhlaq Ahmed debuted as a film singer in the 1973 film Pazaib with music by Lal Mohammad Iqbal. He was unable to get a dominant place in the Pakistan film industry because when he started his singing career Ahmed Rushdi was the prominent playback singer in the Pakistani film industry. Despite that, he remained a somewhat successful singer in the late 1970s and 1980s due to his singing talent.

== Death ==
Akhlaq Ahmed spent the last few years of his life battling blood cancer which was diagnosed back in 1985. His wife, an employee at Pakistan International Airlines (PIA), admitted him at a hospital in London. He died on 4 August 1999, at London and was laid to rest at Walthem Forest Muslim Cemetery in London.

His last film as a singer was Nikah (1998).

== Popular songs ==
- Sawan Aye, Sawan Jaye, Tujh Ko Pukaren Geet Hamaray... 1974 (Film: Chahat, Music: Robin Ghosh)
- Ae Dil, Apna Dard Chhupa Kar, Geet Khushi Kay Gaye Ja..1975 (Film: Pehchan - Music: Nisar Bazmi)
- Raat Bhar Jiya Mora Mujhay Kyun Sataye..1975 (Film: Umang - Music: Robin Ghosh)
- Dekho Yeh Kon Aa Geya, Ban Kay Nasha Chha Geya..1975 (Film: 2 Sathi - Music: Robin Ghosh)
- Ek Thi Guriya Bari Bholi Bhali..1975 (Film: 2 Sathi - Music: Robin Ghosh)
- Main Hun, Rastey Ka Pathar, Hay Naseeb Mera Thokar..1976 (Film: Rastay Ka Pathar - Music: Nashad)
- Sathi Meray, Bin Teray, Kaisay Beetay Gi..1976 (Film: Zubaida - Music: Kamal Ahmed)
- Sona Na Chandi, Na Koi Mahal, Jan-e-Mann..1980 (Film: Bandish - Music: Robin Ghosh)
- Samaan, Woh Khawab Sa Samaa..1980 (Film: Nahin Abhi Nahin - Music: Robin Ghosh)
- Kabhi Khwahishon Nay Loota..1982 (Film: Mehrbani - Music: M. Ashraf)

== Awards and recognition ==
- 7 Nigar Awards for Best Male Playback Singer – won this award 7 times in 1980, 1982, 1983, 1984, 1986, 1987 and in 1990.
