= Nadeem (Pakistani actor) =

Pakistani actor, singer and producer

- ندیم
- Born: Mirza Nazir Baig; 19 July 1941 (age 85); Vijayawada, Madras Presidency, British India (now in Andhra Pradesh, India)
- Occupations: Film actor, singer
- Years active: 1967–present
- Relatives: Captain Ehtesham (father-in-law)
- Awards: Pride of Performance Award by the President of Pakistan (1997); Nigar Awards (won this award 17 times during his career)
- Website: www.supernadeem.com

Mirza Nazir Baig (born 19 July 1941), best known by his screen name Nadeem (Urdu: ندیم), is a Pakistani actor, singer and producer. He has appeared in over two hundred films. He has been honored with the Pride of Performance award in 1997. He has also produced two movies, Mitti Ke Putlay (1974), which he also co-wrote and which won the Lenin Prize in the USSR, and Mukhra (1988), a romantic-comedy Punjabi film.

== Early life ==
Nadeem was born on 19 July 1941 in Vijayawada, which at the time was part of the Madras Presidency in British India. His father worked in an oil company. Nadeem migrated to Dhaka, East Pakistan along with his family after the independence of Pakistan, in 1947. After his early education in Nazimabad, he finished high school at Sindh Madrasa-tul-Islam and attended some years of college at Government Islamia Science College, Karachi before he entered the Pakistani film industry. In his college days he was also a cricketer, playing up to the first-class level in the Quaid-e-Azam Trophy.

Nadeem, and artists Talat Hussain, M. Zaheer Khan, Aftab Azeem, Saleem Jafry, and TV producer Iqbal Haider were all discovered at a club in Karachi in the 1960s. He and his friends, Ameer Ahmed Khan and Qasim Siddiqui, won several music competitions. At one of those musical competitions, he was noticed by singer Ferdausi Rahman. She was impressed by his singing talent and encouraged him to try playback singing in Dhaka's film industry. In Dhaka, while working in an office, he used to sing in both Urdu and Bengali.

== Career ==
Nadeem's film career spans nearly 60 years. He started his career in 1967 and appeared in his first film, Chakori (1967), in a leading role opposite actress Shabana. He was initially supposed to be a playback singer for the movie. The film was produced and directed by Captain Ehtesham, who, in real life, became his father-in-law in 1968 when Nadeem married Farzana, Ehtesham's daughter. The film did well in both circuits of the Pakistani film industry, i.e., West and East Pakistan. He won a Nigar Award in the best actor's category for Chakori. Nadeem's films include Nadan (1973), Anari, Pehchan (1975), Talash (1976), Aina (1977), Hum Dono (1980), Lajawab, Qurbani (1981), Sangdil (1982), and Dehleez (1983). He made a popular screen pairing with actress Shabnam, with whom he acted in most of his films. Besides acting, Nadeem has sung many songs for films. Nadeem has worked with veteran film directors of the Pakistani film industry, including Pervez Malik, Nazrul Islam, S. Suleman, Shamim Ara, Sangeeta, and Samina Peerzada. Among the well-known actors, he has worked with Santosh Kumar, Darpan, Waheed Murad, Allauddin, and Syed Kamal over his long career.

== Playback singers ==
In his career, Nadeem has been mostly voiced by Ahmed Rushdi and later Akhlaq Ahmed provided his voice. He acknowledged that songs in Rushdi's voice made his work easier and played a significant role in his success.

== Personal life ==
Nadeem married a Bangladeshi girl Farzana (A close friend of film actress Shabnam) in 1968, with whom he has 2 sons but the marriage could not last long and eventually they were divorced in 1997. Both his sons choose to live in Bangladesh with their mother. Nadeem currently lives in Karachi and seldom works in Pakistani television plays.

== Selected filmography ==
- Chakori (1967) (Nadeem's debut film)
- Behan Bhai (1968)
- Diya Aur Toofan (1969)
- Daman Aur Chingari (1973)
- Aina (1977)
- Bandish (1980)
- Dillagi (1974)
- Shama (1974)
- Phool Mere Gulshan Ka (1974)
- Anari (1975)
- Jab Jab Phool Khile (1975)
- Pehchan (1975)
- Mutthi Bhar Chawal (1978)
- Pakeeza (1979)
- Dehleez (1983)
- Doordesh (1983) - Bollywood film
- Mukhra (1988) - a film produced by Nadeem Baig also
- Bulandi (1990)
- Sargam (1995)
- Jeeva (1995)
- Inteha (1999)
- Koi Tujh Sa Kahan (2005)
- Mein Ek Din Laut Kay Aaoon Ga (2007)
- Love Mein Gum (2011)
- Main Hoon Shahid Afridi (2013)
- The System (2014)
- Hijrat (2016)
- Sikander (2016)
- Superstar (2019)
- Parey Hut Love (2019)
- Zarrar (2022)
- Tere Bajre Di Rakhi (2022)

== Television ==
Year	Title	Channel
2005	Riyasat	ARY Digital
2007	Saheli	Hum TV
2012	Mil Ke Bhi Hum Na Mile	Geo TV
2014	Jaan Hatheli Par	PTV Home
2015	Mol	Hum TV
2016	Tum Yaad Aaye	ARY Digital
2016	Rishta Hai Jaisey Khawab Sa	Aaj Entertainment
2022	Ishq E Laa	Hum TV
2022	Khaab Toot Jaatay Hain	Hum TV

== Awards and recognition ==
- Nigar Award for a total of 16 times between 1967 and 2002 as an actor including the Nigar Award Millennium Award in 1999
- Pride of Performance Award by the President of Pakistan in 1997

=== Lux Style Awards ===
Ceremony	Category	Project	Result
2nd Lux Style Awards	Chaiperson's Lifetime Achievement Award	for his contributions to Pakistani film industry	Won
4th Lux Style Awards	Best TV Actor (Satellite)	Jaisay Jante Nahi	Nominated
18th Lux Style Awards	Best Film Actor	Superstar	Nominated

== See also ==
- List of Lollywood actors
