= Robin Ghosh =

Pakistani and Bangladeshi film music composer (1939 - 2016)

- রবিন ঘোষ (Bengali) روبن گھوش (Urdu)
- Born: 13 September 1939; Baghdad, Iraq
- Died: 13 February 2016 (aged 76); Dhaka, Bangladesh
- Citizenship: Pakistani (1947–1998); Bangladeshi (1998–2016)
- Occupations: Composer, musician, singer
- Years active: 1961–1986
- Spouse: Shabnam (m. 1964-2016; his death)
- Children: Ronnie Ghosh
- Parent(s): S.M Ghosh (father); Asnat Zia Ghosh (mother)
- Relatives: Badal Ghosh (brother)
- Awards: Won 6 Nigar Awards during his long career

Robin Ghosh (Bengali: রবিন ঘোষ, Urdu: روبن گھوش; 13 September 1939 – 13 February 2016) was a Pakistani-Bangladeshi playback singer and film music composer, best known for singing and composing music for Lollywood films from 1961 to 1986. Robin Ghosh had a notable contribution in establishing career of Playback singer Ahmed Rushdi and to his success. Ghosh gained fame in the mid-1960s when Rushdi sang his compositions in films like Chakori (1967), Jahan Tum Wahan Hum, Paisa, etc.

== Early life ==
Robin Ghosh's father worked for the International Red Cross and was posted at Baghdad during the First World War, where Ghosh was educated in a convent school. His father was a Bengali Hindu, who had never converted to Christianity and his mother was an Arab Catholic Christian named Asnat Zia Ghosh, a Baghdadi Catholic Christian. When Ghosh was young, his father S.M Ghosh left the family and married another woman leaving the family to Asnat, which she raised all by herself in Wari, Old Dhaka. His brother, Ashok Ghosh, was a film director in Bangladesh and directed the film Nacher Putol 1972, which has the famous song "Rup Nogorer Rajkonna".

When the Second World War ended in 1945, the six-year-old Ghosh along with his family moved to Dhaka, in Bengal (in pre-partitioned India). He showed interest in music, collecting gramophone records and playing the harmonium, and finally graduated with music major in Dhaka.

== Family life ==
In the late 1950s, Ghosh was offered a job at the Dhaka Radio Station by a friend. This friend's sister, Shabnam who occasionally played in various Bengali films, became friends with him. The two finally got married. Together they had a son, Ronnie (born 1966).

== Film career ==
Since Robin Ghosh was a Christian, he had exposure to 'choir singing' at his church. When he was young, he had also worked with veteran film music composer Salil Chowdhury. Later he also worked, as an assistant, with a Pakistani film music composer from Bengal, Muslahuddin. In the early 1960s, film director Ehtesham visited Dhaka Radio Station, and offered Ghosh a contract as a composer for his films. His debut was for the Bengali film Raj Dhanir Bookay in 1960, and followed by numerous other Bengali and Urdu films, including Chanda (1962), Talash (1963), Paisa (1964), Chakori (1967) and Bhaiya (1966). After the release of the film Tum Meray Ho, Ghosh moved to Karachi, Pakistan continuing to compose film music into the 1980s. He composed songs for the film Aaina (1977) one of the greatest films ever made in the Pakistani film industry. This film celebrated its Platinum Jubilee at the Pakistani cinemas.

== Awards and recognition ==
Robin Ghosh won a total of 6 Nigar Awards for the following films:

- Nigar Award for best film composer for Talash (1963)
- Nigar Award for best film composer for Chakori (1967)
- Nigar Award for best film composer for Chahat (1974)
- Nigar Award for best film composer for Aaina (1977)
- Nigar Award for best film composer for Bandish (1980)
- Nigar Award for best film composer for Doorian (1984)

== Death and legacy ==
On 10 February 2016, Ghosh became ill and was admitted to a hospital in Dhaka, Bangladesh. He died on 13 February 2016 due to respiratory failure. He was 78 years old.
