= List of Nigar Awards =

Nigar Awards
- Awarded for: Excellence in cinematic achievements
- Location: Lahore
- Country: Pakistan
- Presented by: Weekly Nigar
- First award: 1957
- Final award: 2017

The Nigar Awards are divided in three sections, i.e. Urdu, Punjabi and Pushto film awards. For Punjabi films, the Nigar Awards started from 1970 (in 1967 and 1968, the Nigar Award for Best Punjabi Film was awarded). Since 1979, the award administration also started to give Nigar Awards to television personalities and since 1982, to stage artists.

Following is the list of Nigar Awards for Urdu films from 1957 to 2002 and 2017 and Nigar Awards for Punjabi films from 1967 to 2002.

== 1957 ==
=== For Urdu films ===
Award	Winner	Film
Best Film	Saifuddin Saif	Saat Lakh
Best Director	W.Z. Ahmed	Waadah
Best Script / Story Writer	Saifuddin Saif	Saat Lakh
Best Actor	Santosh Kumar	Waadah
Best Actress	Sabiha Khanum	Saat Lakh
Best Supporting Actor	Allauddin	Aas Paas
Best Supporting Actress	Nayyar Sultana	Saat Lakh
Best Musician	Rasheed Attre	Saat Lakh
Best Cinematographer	Suhail Hashmi	Bara Aadmi

== 1958 ==
=== For Urdu films ===
Award	Awardee	Film
Best Film		Aadmi
Best Director	Luqman	Aadmi
Best Script Writer	Ayub Sarwar	Aadmi
Best Actor	Habib	Aadmi
Best Actress	Musarrat Nazir	Zehr-e-Ishq
Best Actress	Bibbo	Zehr-e-Ishq
Best Supporting Actor	Allauddin	Aadmi
Best Supporting Actress	Bano Begum	Zehr-e-Ishq
Best Musician	Khwaja Khurshid Anwar	Zehr-e-Ishq
Best Lyricist	Qateel Shifai	Anarkali
Best Cinematographer	Raza Mir	Aakhri Nishan
Best Sound Editor	Afzal Hussain	Zehr-e-Ishq
Best Female Playback Singer	Noor Jehan	Anarkali

== 1959 ==
=== For Urdu films ===
Award	Awardee	Film
Best Film		Raaz
Best Director	Khalil Qaiser	Nagin
Best Script Writer	Riaz Shahid	Neend
Best Actor	Darpan	Saathi
Best Actress	Musarrat Nazir	Jhoomer
Best Supporting Actor	Allauddin	Raaz
Best Supporting Actress	Neelo	Koel
Best Musician	Rasheed Attre	Neend
Best Lyricist	Tanvir Naqvi	Koel
Best Cinematographer	Nabi Ahmed	Jhoomer
Best Playback Singer	Noor Jehan	Koel
Best Editor	Khursheed Ahmed	Faisla
Best Sound Editor	C. Mandody	Koel

== 1960 ==
=== For Urdu films ===
Award	Awardee	Film
Best Film		Salma
Best Director	S. M. Yusuf	Saheli
Best script writer	Anwar Kamal Pasha	Watan
Best screenplay	Nazeer Ajmeri	Salma
Best actor	Darpan	Saheli
Best actress	Nayyar Sultana	Saheli
Best Supporting Actor	Allauddin	Salma
Best supporting actress	Shamim Ara	Saheli
Best musician	Muslehuddin	Humsafar
Best Lyricist	Tanvir Naqvi	Shaam Dhalay
Best cinematographer	Nabi Ahmed	Ayaz
Best playback female singer	Naseem Begum	Shaam Dhalay
Best playback male singer	Saleem Raza	Humsafar
Best editor	M. Akram	Shaam Dhalay
Best sound editor	Taj Malik	Shaam Dhalay
Best comedian – special award	Nazar	Humsafar

=== For Bengali films ===
Award	Awardee	Film
Best Film		Asiya

== 1961 ==
=== For Urdu films ===
Award	Awardee	Film
Best actor	Habib	Surayya
Best supporting actress	Bano Begum	Ghalib
Best musician	Rasheed Attre	Shaheed
Best Lyricist	Faiz Ahmed Faiz	Shaheed
Best cinematographer	Riaz Bukhari	Zamana Kya Kahe Ga
Best playback female singer	Naseem Begum	Shaheed
Best playback male singer	Ahmed Rushdi	Saperan
Best editor	M. Akram	Gulfaam
Best sound editor	Zafar Khawaja	Zamana Kya Kahe Ga

== 1962 ==
=== For Urdu films ===
Award	Awardee	Film
Best Film		Shaheed
Best Director	Khalil Qaiser	Shaheed
Best script writer	Riaz Shahid	Shaheed
Best screenplay	Riaz Shahid	Shaheed
Best actress	Musarrat Nazir	Shaheed
Best Supporting Actor	Talish	Shaheed
Best Film		Chanda
Best Director	NFAK	Aulad
Best script writer	Fazal Ahmad Karim Fazli	Chiragh Jalta Raha
Best Supporting Actress	Zeba	Chiragh Jalta Raha
Best screenplay	Ibrahim Jalees	Aanchal
Best actor	Santosh Kumar	Ghunghat
Best actress	Nayyar Sultana	Aulad
Best Supporting Actor	Talish	Aanchal
Best supporting actress	Shabnam	Chanda
Best musician	Khwaja Khurshid Anwar	Ghunghat
Best Lyricist	Himayat Ali Shair	Aanchal
Best cinematographer	Nabi Ahmed	Ghunghat
Best playback female singer	Mala	Ishq Par Zor Nahin
Best playback male singer	Ahmed Rushdi	Mehtaab
Best editor	Ali	Ghunghat
Best sound editor	C. Mondody	Mehtaab
Best comedian	Subhash Dutta	Chanda

== 1963 ==
=== For Urdu films ===
Award	Awardee	Film
Best Film		Baaji
Best Director	Qadeer Ghori	Daman
Best script writer	Anwar Batalvi	Baaji
Best screenplay	Riaz Shahid	Shikwa
Best actor	Santosh Kumar	Daman
Best actress	Sabiha Khanum	Shikwa
Best Supporting Actor	Allauddin	Shikwa
Best supporting actress	Neelo	Daman
Best musician	Robin Ghosh	Talash
Best Lyricist	Himayat Ali Shair	Daman
Best cinematographer	Raza Mir	Seema
Best playback female singer	Naseem Begum	Baaji
Best playback male singer	Saleem Raza	Seema
Best editor	Haider Chaudhry	Baji
Best art director	Haji Mohiuddin	Faanoos
Best sound editor	Taj Malik	Baji
Best comedian	Lehri	Daman

== 1964 ==
=== For Urdu films ===
Award	Awardee	Film
Best Film	Tajamul Hasan Rizvi	Khamosh Raho
Best Director	S.M. Yousuf	Ashiana
Best script writer	Riaz Shahid	Khamosh Raho
Best screenplay	Riaz Shahid	Farangi
Best actor	Waheed Murad	Heera Aur Pathar
Best actress	Shamim Ara	Farangi
Best Supporting Actor	Mohammad Ali	Khamosh Raho
Best supporting actress	Sumeeta	Sangam
Best musician	Nashad	Maikhana
Best Lyricist	Faiz Ahmad Faiz	Farangi
Best cinematographer	Babar Bilal	Aashiana
Best playback female singer	Naseem Begum	Lutera
Best playback male singer	Mehdi Hassan	Farangi
Best editor	M. Aqeel Khan	Heera Aur Pathar
Best art director	Haji Mohiuddin	Maikhana
Best sound editor	Yousuf Ameen	Khamosh Raho
Best comedian	Lehri	Paigham

== 1965 ==
=== For Urdu films ===
Award	Awardee	Film
Best Film		Naila
Best Director	Sharif Nayyar	Naila
Best script writer	Hajra Masroor	Aakhri Station
Best screenplay	Ali Sufiyan Afaqi	Kaneez
Best actor	Mohammad Ali	Kaneez
Best actress	Shamim Ara	Naila
Best Supporting Actor	Talish	Kaneez
Best supporting actress	Shabnam	Aakhri Station
Best musician	Master Inayat	Naila
Best Lyricist	Qateel Shifai	Naila
Best cinematographer	Nabi Ahmed	Naila
Best playback female singer	Mala	Naila
Best playback male singer	Masood Rana	Mujahid
Best editor	Asghar	Kaneez
Best art director	S.M. Khwaja	Naila
Best sound editor	Hashim Qureshi	Eid mubarak
Best comedian	Lehri	Kaneez
Special award	Noor Jehan	(for war-time songs)

== 1966 ==
=== For Urdu films ===
Award	Awardee	Film
Best Film	Waheed Murad	Armaan
Best Director	Pervez Malik	Arman
Best script writer	Saadat Hassan Manto	Badnaam
Best screenplay	Ahmad Nadeem Qasmi	Lori
Best actor	Mohammad Ali	Aag Ka Darya
Best actress	Zeba	Armaan
Best Supporting Actor	Shaukat Akbar	Bhayya
Best supporting actress	Nabila	Badnaam
Best musician	Sohail Rana	Armaan
Best Lyricist	Josh Malihabadi	Aag Ka Darya
Best cinematographer	Raza Mir	Aag Ka Darya
Best playback female singer	Noor Jehan	Aag Ka Darya
Best playback male singer	Ahmed Rushdi	Armaan
Best editor	Maqsood Hussain	Jaag Utha Insaan
Best art director	M. Ramzan	Aaina
Best sound editor	Hassan Zia	Lori
Best comedian	Nirala	Armaan
Special award	Sohail Hashmi	Jaan Pehchaan
Special award	Master Rufi	Lori
Special award	Allauddin	Badnaam

== 1967 ==
=== For Urdu films ===
Award	Awardee	Film
Best Film	Mustafiz	Chakori
Best Director	Ehtesham	Chakori
Best script writer	Ata-ur-Rehman Khan	Chakori
Best screenplay	Naqi Mustafa	Nawab Sirajuddaula
Best actor	Nadeem	Chakori
Best actress	Shamim Ara	Lakhon Mein Aik
Best Supporting Actor	Saaqi	Lakhon Mein Aik
Best supporting actress	Tarannum	Aag
Best musician	Robin Ghosh	Chakori
Best Lyricist	Fayyaz Hashmi	Lakhon Mein Aik
Best cinematographer	Kamran Mirza	Lakhon Mein Aik
Best playback female singer	Noor Jehan	Lakhon Mein Aik
Best playback male singer	Mujeeb Aalam	Chakori
Best editor	Khudadad Mirza	Aag
Best art director	Haji Mohiuddin	Aag
Best sound editor	Afzal Hussain	Lakhon Mein Aik
Best comedian	Lehri	Mein Woh Nahin
Special award	Sabiha Khanum	Devar Bhabi
Special award	Anwar Hossain	Nawab Sirajuddaula

=== For Punjabi films ===
Award	Awardee	Film
Best Film		Dil Da Jaani

== 1968 ==
=== For Urdu films ===
Award	Awardee	Film
Best Film		Saiqa
Best Director	Hassan Tariq	Behan Bhai
Best script writer	Razia Butt	Saiqa
Best screenplay	Masroor Anwar	Saiqa
Best actor	Mohammad Ali	Saiqa
Best actress	Shamim Ara	Saiqa
Best Supporting Actor	Allauddin	Dil Liya Dard Diya
Best supporting actress	Rozina Qureshi	Ishara
Best musician	Nisar Bazmi	Saiqa
Best Lyricist	Masroor Anwar	Saiqa
Best cinematographer	Masood-ul-Rehman	Taj Mahal
Best playback female singer	Runa Laila	Commander
Best playback male singer	Mehdi Hassan	Saiqa
Best Film editor		
Best art director	Haji Mohiuddin	Taj Mahal
Best sound editor	Taj Malik	Ishq
Best comedian	Lehri	Saiqa
Special award	Kamal	Behan Bhai
Special award	Rani	Mera Ghar Meri Jannat
Special award	Babu Jugnu	Mera Ghar Meri Jannat

=== For Punjabi films ===
Award	Awardee	Film
Best Film		Chan Makhana

== 1969 ==
=== For Urdu films ===
Award	Awardee	Film
Best Film		Zarqa
Best Director	Riaz Shahid	Zarqa
Best script writer	Riaz Shahid	Zarqa
Best screenplay	Ali Sufyan Afaaqi	Andaleeb
Best actor	Waheed Murad	Andaleeb
Best actress	Neelo	Zarqa
Best Supporting Actor	Qavi Khan	Bahu Rani
Best supporting actress	Aliya Begum	Nai Laila Naya Majnu
Best musician	Nashad	Salgirah
Best Lyricist	Habib Jalib	Zarqa
Best cinematographer	Afzal Chowdhary	Pyasa
Best playback female singer	Noor Jehan	Salgirah
Best playback male singer	Mehdi Hassan	Zarqa
Best Film editor	Ali	Zarqa
Best art director	Habib Shah	Zarqa
Best sound editor	A.Z. Baig	Andaleeb
Best comedian	Lehri	Nai Laila Naya Majnu
Special award	Shabnam	Andaleeb
Special award	A. J. Kardar	Qasam Us Waqt Ki

== 1970 ==
=== For Urdu films ===
Award	Awardee	Film
Best Film	Safdar Masood	Anjuman
Best Director	Hassan Tariq	Anjuman
Best script writer	Rangeela	Rangeela
Best screenplay	Masroor Anwar	Sughaat
Best actor	Mohammad Ali	Insaan Aur Aadmi
Best actress	Zeba	Insaan Aur Aadmi
Best Supporting Actor	Aslam Pervaiz	Insaan Aur Aadmi
Best supporting actress	Saiqa	Rangeela
Best musician	Nisar Bazmi	Anjuman
Best Lyricist	Masroor Anwar	Anjuman
Best cinematographer	Sohail Hashmi	Honeymoon
Best playback female singer	Runa Laila	Anjuman
Best playback male singer	Ahmed Rushdi	Naseeb Apna Apna
Best Film editor	AlHamid	Anjuman
Best art director	Habib Shah	Anjuman
Best sound editor	Akhtar Gilani	Insaan Aur Aadmi
Best comedian	Lehri	Anjuman
Special award	Habib Wali Mohammad	for singing "Aashian Jal Gya"

=== For Punjabi films ===
Award	Awardee	Film
Best Film		Heer Ranjha
Best Director	Masood Parvez	Heer Ranjha
Best script writer	Tanvir Kazmi	Maa Puttar
Best actor	Sudhir	Maa Puttar
Best actress	Firdous Begum	Heer Ranjha
Best Female Playback Singer	Noor Jehan	Heer Ranjha
Best musician	Khwaja Khurshid Anwar	Heer Ranjha
Special award	Ajmal	Heer Ranjha
Special award	Deeba	Sajna Door Diya

== 1971 ==
=== For Urdu films ===
Award	Awardee	Film
Best Film		Dosti
Best Director	Sharif Nayyar	Dosti
Best script writer	Riaz Ahmed	Ansu
Best screenplay	Riaz Shahid	Yeh Aman
Best actor	Mohammad Ali	Wehshi
Best actress	Shabnam	Dosti
Best Supporting Actor	Masood Akhtar	Teri Soorat Meri Aankhein
Best supporting actress	Sangeeta	Yeh Aman
Best musician	A. Hameed	Dosti
Best Lyricist	Tanveer Naqvi	Dosti
Best cinematographer	M. Fazil	Dosti
Best playback female singer	Noor Jehan	Dosti
Best playback male singer	Masood Rana	Ansu
Best Film editor	Arshad Durrani	Dosti
Best art director	Habib Shah	Yeh Aman
Best sound editor	A.Z. Baig	Yeh Aman
Best comedian	Rangeela	Dil Aur Duniya
Best cinematographer	Ali Khan	Dil Aur Duniya
Special award	Firdous	Ansu

=== For Punjabi films ===
Award	Awardee	Film
Best Film		Babul
Best Director	Iqbal Kashmiri	Babul
Best script writer	Ghazanfar Ali	Babul
Best actor	Waheed Murad	Mastana Mahi
Best actress	Rani	Babul
Best musician	Nazir Ali	Mastana Mahi
Special Award	Aliya Begum	Mastana Mahi
Special Award	Sultan Rahi	Babul
Special Award	Munawar Zarif	Ishq Deewana

== 1972 ==
=== For Urdu films ===
Award	Awardee	Film
Best Film	M. Sadiq	Baharo Phool Barsao
Best Director	Nazrul Islam	Ehsaas
Best script writer	M. Sadiq	Baharo Phool Barsao
Best screenplay	Bashir Niaz	Ehsaas
Best actor	Nadeem	Ehsaas
Best actress	Zeba	Mohabbat
Best Supporting Actor	Talish	Angarey
Best supporting actress	Husna	Subaq
Best musician	Nisar Bazmi	Meri Zindagi Hai Nagma
Best Lyricist	S. Rizvi	Baharo Phool Barsao
Best cinematographer	Sohail Hashmi	Mere Humsafar
Best playback female singer	Tahira Syed	Mohabbat
Best playback male singer	Mehdi Hassan	Meri Zindagi Hai Nagma
Best Film editor	Hasnain	Mere Humsafar
Best art director	Islam Shahabi	Sabaq
Best sound editor	A.Z. Baig	Sabaq
Best comedian	Munawar Zarif	Baharo Phool Barsao
Special award	Rangeela	Meri Zindagi Hai Nagma

=== For Punjabi films ===
Award	Awardee	Film
Best Film		Basheera
Best Director	Aslam Dar	Basheera
Best script writer	Aziz Bhatti	Basheera
Best actor	Sultan Rahi	Basheera
Best Actress	Aliya Begum	Zulm Da Badla
Best cinematographer	Javed Malik	Ek Raat
Best Female Playback Singer	Noor Jehan	Sultan
Best musician	Nazir Ali	Sultan

== 1973 ==
=== For Urdu films ===
Award	Awardee	Film
Best Film		Aas
Best Director	Ali Sufiyan Afaqi	Aas
Best script writer	Ali Sufian Afaqi	Aas
Best screenplay	Ali Sufian Afaqi	Aas
Best actor	Mohammad Ali	Aas
Best actress	Shabnum	Anmol
Best Supporting Actor	Munawar Saeed	Anmol
Best supporting actress	Sofia Bano	Pardey Mein Rehney Do
Best musician	M Ashraf	Gharana
Best Lyricist	S. Rizvi	Gharana
Best cinematographer	Ghazanfar Bukhari	Aas
Best playback female singer	Nayyara Noor	Gharana
Best playback male singer	Mehdi Hassan	Naya Rasta
Best Film editor	Ali	Daman Aur Chingari
Best art director	Islam Shahabi	Aas
Best sound editor	Mubarak Ali	Aas
Best comedian	Rangeela	Insan Aur Gadha

=== For Punjabi films ===
Award	Awardee	Film
Best Film		Ziddi
Best Director	Iqbal Kashmiri	Ziddi
Best script writer	Hazeen Qadri	Ziddi
Best actor	Yousuf Khan	Ziddi
Best actress	Firdous	Ziddi
Best cinematographer	Sarwar Gul	Jeera Blade
Best Female Playback Singer	Noor Jehan	Ziddi
Best musician	Master Abdullah	Ziddi

== 1974 ==
=== For Urdu films ===
Award	Awardee	Film
Best Film		Bahisht
Best Director	Nazrul Islam	Sharafat
Best script writer	Riaz Shahid	Bahisht
Best screenplay	Riaz Shahid	Bahisht
Best actor	Mohammad Ali	Aaina Aur Soorat
Best actress	Shabnum	Dillagi
Best Supporting Actor	Shahid	Deedar
Best supporting actress	Nayyar Sultana	Bahisht
Best musician	Robin Ghosh	Chahat
Best Lyricist	Akhtar Yousuf	Chahat
Best cinematographer	Afzal Chaudhary	Sharafat
Best playback female singer	Naheed Akhtar	Shama
Best playback male singer	Mehdi Hassan	Sharafat
Best Film editor	Irshad Durrani	Sharafat
Best art director	Islam Shahabi	Deedar
Best sound editor	Wajid Ali	Dillagi
Best comedian	Lehri	Dillagi
Special award	Akhlaq Ahmed	Chahat

=== For Punjabi films ===
Award	Awardee	Film
Best Film		Naukar Wohti Da
Best Director	Haider Chudhary	Naukar Wohti Da
Best script writer	Sheikh Iqbal	Naukar Wohti Da
Best actor	Sudhir	Lottery
Best actress	Neelo	Khatarnaak
Best cinematographer	Masood-ul-Rahman	Khatarnaak
Best musician	Wajahat Attre	Naukar Wohti Da

== 1975 ==
=== For Urdu films ===
Award	Awardee	Film
Best Film		Mera Naam Hai Mohabaat
Best Director	Shabab Kiranvi	Mera Naam Hai Mohabaat
Best Script	Shabab Kiranvi	Mera Naam Hai Mohabaat
Best Screenplay	Agha Imtesal	Aik Gunnah Aur Sahi
Best Actor	Nadeem	Anari
Best Actress	Shabnam	Zeenat
Best Supporting Actor	Talish	Zeenat
Best Supporting Actress	Kaveeta	Teray Meray Sapnay
Best Music	M Ashraf	Mera Naam Hai Mohabbat
Best Lyrics	Masroor Anwar	Pehchan
Best Cinematographer	Babar Bilal	Aik Gunnah Aur Sahi
Best Female Singer	Naheed Akhtar	Pehchan
Best Male Singer	Mehdi Hassan	Zeenat
Best Editor	Javed Tahir	Mera Naam Hai Mohabbat
Best Art Director	Islam Shahabi	Aik Gunnah Aur Sahi
Best Sound	A.Z. Baig	Zeenat
Best Comedian	Munawar Zarif	Zeenat
Special Award	Sabiha Khanum	Aik Gunnah Aur Sahi
Special Award	Babra Sharif	Mera Naam Hai Mohabbat
Special Award	Ghulam Mohiuddin	Mera Naam Hai Mohabbat

=== For Punjabi films ===
Award	Awardee	Film
Best Film		Wehshi Jatt
Best Director	Hasan Askari	Wehshi Jatt
Best Script	Ahmad Nadeem Qasmi	Wehshi Jatt
Best Actor	Sultan Rahi	Wehshi Jatt
Best Actress	Mumtaz	Jadoo
Best Cinematographer	Irshad Ahmed	Wehshi Jatt
Best Music	Master Inayat Hussain	Jadoo

== 1976 ==
=== For Urdu films ===
Award	Awardee	Film
Best Film		Aaj Aur Kal
Best Director	S. Suleman	Aaj Aur Kal
Best script writer	Nazir Ajmeri	Aaj Aur Kal
Best screenplay	Bashir Niaz	Aaj Aur Kal
Best actor	Shahid	Shabana
Best actress	Babra Sharif	Shabana
Best Supporting Actor	Qavi Khan	Aaj Aur Kal
Best supporting actress	Kaveeta	Society Girl
Best musician	M Ashraf	Shabana
Best Lyricist	Tasleem Fazli	Shabana
Best cinematographer	M. Hussain	Andaata
Best playback female singer	Noor Jehan	Aaj Aur Kal
Best playback male singer	Mehdi Hassan	Shabana
Best Film editor	A. Saeed	Society Girl
Best art director	Islam Shahabi	Waqt
Best sound editor	A.Z. Baig	Aaj Aur Kal
Best comedian	Lehri	Aaj Aur Kal
Special award	Roohi Bano	Insaan Aur Farishta
Special award	Sangeeta	Society Girl

=== For Punjabi films ===
Award	Awardee	Film
Best Film		Toofan
Best Director	Hassan Askari	Toofan
Best script writer	Nasir Adeeb	Toofan
Best actor	Kamal	Jat Kurian Taun Darda
Best actress	Neelo	Jat Kurian Taun Darda
Best musician	Wajahat Attre	Jat Kurian Taun Darda

== 1977 ==
=== For Urdu films ===
Award	Awardee	Film
Best Film	A.R. Shamsi	Aaina
Best Director	Nazrul Islam	Aaina
Best script writer	Salma Kanwal	Mehmaan
Best screenplay	Bashir Niaz	Aaina
Best actor	Nadeem	Aaina
Best actress	Shabnam	Aaina
Best Supporting Actor	Rehan	Aaina
Best supporting actress	Tamanna	Bharosa
Best musician	Robin Ghosh	Aaina
Best Lyricist	Tasleem Fazli	Aaina
Best cinematographer	Afzal Chaudhary	Aaina
Best playback female singer	Mehnaz Begum	Salakhein
Best playback male singer	Mehdi Hassan	Aaina
Best Film editor	A. Saeed	Mehmaan
Best art director	Islam	Bharosa
Best sound editor	Sohail Najmi	Mehmaan
Best comedian	Nanha	Bharosa
Special award	Alamgir	Aaina
Special award	Shahzeb (child star)	Aaina

=== For Punjabi films ===
Award	Awardee	Film
Best Film		Aj Diyan Kurrian
Best Director	Waheed Dar	Jabroo
Best script writer	S. Dar	Jabroo
Best actor	Yousuf Khan	Jabroo
Best actress	Aasia	Qanoon
Best musician	Wajahat Attre	Aj Diyan Kurrian

== 1978 ==
=== For Urdu films ===
Award	Awardee	Film
Best Film		Mutthi Bhar Chawal
Best Director	Sangeeta	Mutthi Bhar Chawal
Best script writer	Riaz Shahid	Haider Ali
Best Supporting Actress	Shehla Gill	Mutthi Bhar Chawal
Best screenplay	Bashir Niaz	Amber
Best actor	Mohammad Ali	Haider Ali
Best actress	Sangeeta	Mutthi Bhar Chawal
Best Supporting Actor	Qavi Khan	Parakh
Best supporting actress	Nadia	Playboy
Best musician	Robin Ghosh	Amber
Best Lyricist	Kaleem Usmani	Zindagi
Best cinematographer	Kamran Mirza	Playboy
Best playback female singer	Mehnaz	Playboy
Best playback male singer	Ghulam Abbas	Maazi Haal Mustaqbil
Best Film editor	Z.A. Zulfi	Mutthi Bhar Chawal
Best art director	Habib Shah	Haider Ali
Best sound editor	Gulzar Ali	Awaz
Best comedian	Nanha	Playboy
Special award	Mumtaz	Haider Ali
Special award	Ghulam Mohiuddin	Maazi Haal Mustaqbil

=== For Punjabi films ===
Award	Awardee	Film
Best Film		Shola
Best Director	Rehmat Ali	Shola
Best script writer	K. Qadri	Ilm Deen Shaheed
Best actor	Asif Khan	Shola
Best actress	Najma	Shola
Best musician	Akbar Amar Anthony	Wajahat Attre

== 1979 ==
=== For Urdu films ===
Award	Awardee	Film
Best Film		Khaak Aur Khoon
Best Director	Masood Parvez	Khaak Aur Khoon
Best script writer	Naseem Hijazi	Khaak Aur Khoon
Best screenplay	Naseem Hijazi	Khaak Aur Khoon
Best actor	Nadeem	Pakeeza
Best actress	Shabnam	Pakeeza
Best Supporting Actor	Mustafa Qureshi	Lal Aandhi
Best supporting actress	Aasia	Aag
Best musician	Nisar Bazmi	Khaak Aur Khoon
Best Lyricist	Qateel Shifai	Aag
Best cinematographer	Masood-ur-Rehman	Khaak Aur Khoon
Best playback female singer	Mehnaz Begum	Khushboo
Best playback male singer	A. Nayyar	Aag
Best Film editor	Ali	Khaak Aur Khoon
Best art director	Haji Mohiuddin	Khaak Aur Khoon
Best sound editor	M. Saeed	Miss Hong Kong
Best comedian	Lehri	Naya andaaz
Special award	Ashar	Aag
Special award	Nazir Chan	Miss Hong Kong

=== For Punjabi films ===
Award	Awardee	Film
Best Film		Dubai Chalo
Best Director	Haider Chaudhury	Dubai Chalo
Best script writer	Riaz Batelvi	Dubai Chalo
Best Female Playback Singer	Noor Jehan	Dubai Chalo
Best actor	Ali Ejaz	Dubai Chalo
Best actress	Mumtaz	Nizam Daku
Best musician	Ustad Tafu	Dubai Chalo

=== For television ===
Award	Awardee	Television
Special Award	Fatima Surayya Bajia	PTV

== 1980 ==
=== For Urdu films ===
Award	Awardee	Film
Best Film		Saima
Best Director	Javed Fazil	Saima
Best script writer	Nazir Ajmeri	Saima
Best screenplay	Syed Noor	Saima
Best actor	Nadeem	Saima
Best actress	Shabnam	Hum Dono
Best Supporting Actor	Allauddin	Bandish
Best supporting actress	Bazgha	Saima
Best musician	Robin Ghosh	Bandish
Best Lyricist	Tasleem Fazli	Bandish
Best cinematographer	Kamran Mirza	Bandish
Best playback female singer	Mehnaz	Bandish
Best playback male singer	Akhlaq Ahmed	Bandish
Best Film editor	K.D. Mirza	Bandish
Best art director	Haji Mohiuddin	Zameer
Best sound editor	S. Afzal Hussain	Saima
Best comedian	Lehri	Saima
Special award	Diana Kristina	Bandish
Special award	Faisal Rehman	Nahin Abhi Nahin

=== For Punjabi films ===
Award	Awardee	Film
Best Film		Sohra Ta Javai
Best Director	Haider Chaudhury	Sohra Ta Javai
Best script writer	Syed Noor	Sohra Ta Javai
Best Female Playback Singer	Noor Jehan	Sohra Ta Javai
Best actor	Ali Ejaz	Sohra Ta Javai
Best actress	Mumtaz	Sohra Ta Javai
Best musician	Wajahat Attre	Do Toofan

== 1981 ==
=== For Urdu films ===
Award	Awardee	Film
Best Film		Qurbani
Best Director	Pervaiz Malik	Qurbani
Best script writer	T. Jamil	Kiran Aur Kali
Best screenplay	Amjad Islam	Qurbani
Best actor	Nadeem	Qurbani
Best actress	Shabnam	Qurbani
Best Supporting Actor	Faisal Rehman	Yeh Zamana Aur Hai
Best supporting actress	Shaista Qaiser	Kiran Aur Kali
Best musician	M. Ashraf	Qurbani
Best Lyricist	Masroor Anwar	Qurbani
Best cinematographer	Riaz Bukhari	Qurbani
Best playback female singer	Mehnaz	Qurbani
Best playback male singer	Ghulam Abbas	Qurbani
Best Film editor	Akbar Ali	Kaala Dhanda Goray Log
Best art director	Islam Shahabi	Manzil
Best sound editor	M. Hussain	Kiran Aur Kali
Best comedian	Jamil Fakhri	Yeh Zamana Aur Hai
Special award	Master Khurram	Qurbani
Special award	Noor Jehan	for 30 years of excellence
Special award	Sabiha Khanum	for 30 years of excellence
Special award	Shabab Kiranvi	for 30 years of excellence
Special award	Anwar Kamal Pasha	for 30 years of excellence
Special award	Sudhir	for 30 years of excellence
Special award	Aslam Pervaiz	for 30 years of excellence

=== For Punjabi films ===
Award	Awardee	Film
Best Film		Sher Khan
Best Director	Yunus Malik	Sher Khan
Best script writer	Nasir Adeeb	Chan Veryam
Best actor	Mustafa Qureshi	Sher Khan
Best actress	Anjuman	Sher Khan
Best musician	Wajahat Attre	Sher Khan
Best Female Playback Singer	Noor Jehan	Sher Khan

=== For television ===
Award	Awardee	Television
Best Producer	Shehzad Khalil	PTV

== 1982 ==
=== For Urdu films ===
Award	Awardee	Film
Best Film		Sangdil
Best Director	Hassan Tariq	Sangdil
Best script writer	Syed Noor	Sangdil
Best screenplay	A.S. Afaqi	Meharbani
Best actor	Nadeem	Sangdil
Best actress	Babra Sharif	Sangdil
Best Supporting Actor	S. Hashmi	Naseeb
Best supporting actress	Sabiha Khanum	Sangdil
Best musician	Nisar Bazmi	Biwi Ho To Aisi
Best Lyricist	Masroor Anwar	Biwi Ho To Aisi
Best cinematographer	Kamran Mirza	Sangdil
Best playback female singer	Mehnaz	Biwi Ho To Aisi
Best playback male singer	Akhlaq Ahmed	Meharbani
Best Film editor	Asghar	Sangdil
Best art director	Islam Shahabi	Sangdil
Best sound editor	M. Zafar	Sangdil
Best comedian	Lehri	Biwi Ho To Aisi
Special award	Rangeela	Nauker Te Malik
Special award	Asha Posley	for 30 years of excellence
Special award	Meena Shorey	for 30 years of excellence
Special award	Nazir	for 30 years of excellence
Special award	Azad	for 30 years of excellence

=== For Punjabi films ===
Award	Awardee	Film
Best Film		Naukar Te Maalik
Best Director	Hasnain	Naukar Te Maalik
Best script writer	Bashir Niaz	Naukar Te Maalik
Best actor	Ali Ejaz	Naukar Te Maalik
Best actress	Anjuman	Do Bigha Zameen
Best musician	Wajahat Attre	Do Bigha Zameen

=== For television ===
Award	Awardee	Program
Best Actress	Shehnaz Sheikh	Ankahi
Best Writer	Haseena Moin	Ankahi
Best Singer	Tahira Syed	PTV
Best Newscaster	Arjumand Shaheen	PTV
Best Documentary Film		Jangli Janwar

== 1983 ==
=== For Urdu films ===
Award	Awardee	Film
Best Film		Dehleez
Best Director	Javed Fazil	Dehleez
Best script writer	Syed Noor	Dehleez
Best screenplay	A.S. Afaqi	Kabhi Alvida Na Kehna
Best actor	Nadeem	Dehleez
Best actress	Shabnam	Kabhi Alvida Na Kehna
Best Supporting Actor	Talat Hussain	Gumnaam
Best supporting actress	Bazgha	Tina
Best musician	Amjad Bobby	Kabhi Alvida Na Kehna
Best Lyricist	Saeed Gilani	Kabhi Alvida Na Kehna
Best cinematographer	Pervaiz Khan	Dehleez
Best playback female singer	Mehnaz	Kabhi Alvida Na Kehna
Best playback male singer	Akhlaq Ahmed	Nadaani
Best Film editor	Asghar	Dehleez
Best art director	Haji Mohiuddin	Dehleez
Best sound editor	M. Zafar	Love story
Best comedian	Nanna	Love story
Special award	Master Shahbaz	Kabhi Alvida Na Kehna

=== For Punjabi films ===
Award	Awardee	Film
Best Film		Sona Chandi
Best Director	Rangeela	Sona Chandi
Best script writer	Rangeela	Sona Chandi
Best actor	Mustafa Qureshi	Rustam Te Khan
Best actress	Rani Begum	Sona Chandi
Best musician	Wajahat Attre	Saab Ji
Best Female Playback Singer	Noor Jehan	Sona Chandi
Special Award	Sangeeta	Sona Chandi

=== For television ===
Award	Awardee	Program
Best Actor	Noor Muhammad Lashari	Dewarein
Best Writer	Abdul Qadir Junaijo	Dewarein
Best Singer	Abida Parveen	PTV
Best Newscaster	Mahpara Safdar	PTV Khabarnama

== 1984 ==
=== For Urdu films ===
Award	Awardee	Film
Best Film		Doorian
Best Director	Hassan Askari	Doorian
Best script writer	Bashir Niaz	Doorian
Best screenplay	Ali Afaqi	Kamyabi
Best actor	Nadeem	Lazawal
Best actress	Babra Sharif	Miss Colombo
Best Supporting Actor	Ghulam Mohiuddin	Lazawal
Best supporting actress	Sangeeta	Naam Mera Badnaam
Best musician	Robin Ghosh	Doorian
Best Lyricist	Masroor Anwar	Bobby
Best cinematographer	Kamran Mirza	Miss Colombo
Best playback female singer	Nayyara Noor	Doorian
Best playback male singer	Akhlaq Ahmed	Doorian
Best Film editor	K.D. Mirza	Miss Colombo
Best art director	Haji Mohiuddin	Doorian
Best sound editor	M. Zafar	Lazawal
Best comedian	Rangeela	Miss Colombo
Special award	Aslam Pervaiz	Miss Colombo
Special award	Mohammad Ali	Doorian and Bobby

=== For Punjabi films ===
Award	Awardee	Film
Best Film		Ishaq Nachaway Gali Gali
Best Director	Aslam Daar	Ishaq Nachaway Gali Gali
Best script writer	Saeed Sahli	Ishaq Nachaway Gali Gali
Best actor	Ayaz Naik	Ishaq Nachaway Gali Gali
Best actress	Durdana Rehman	Ishaq Nachaway Gali Gali
Best musician	Kamal Ahmed	Ishaq Nachaway Gali Gali

=== For television ===
Award	Awardee	Program
Best Actress	Bushra Ansari	Angan Terha
Best Writer	Anwar Maqsood	Angan Terha
Best Singer	Tahira Syed	PTV
Best Actor	Jameel Fakhri	Andhera Ujala

== 1985 ==
=== For Urdu films ===
Award	Awardee	Film
Best Film		Naraz
Best Director	Javed Fazil	Naraz
Best script writer	Saeed Gilani	[Naraz]]
Best screenplay	Hassan Imtesal	Jeenay Nahin Doon Gi
Best actor	Nadeem	Naraz
Best actress	Shabnam	Naraaz
Best Supporting Actor	Talat Hussain	Hum Se Hai Zamana
Best supporting actress	Samina Ahmed	Naraaz
Best musician	Kamal Ahmed	Jeenay Nahin Doon Gi
Best Lyricist	Khwaja Pervaiz	Direct Hawaldar
Best cinematographer	Jan Mohammad	Hong Kong Ke Sholay
Best playback female singer	Nahid Akhtar	Hum Se Hai Zamana
Best playback male singer	A. Nayyar	Jeenay Nahin Doon Gi
Best Film editor	Zulfi	Hong Kong Ke Sholay
Best art director	Islam Shahabi	Qismet
Best sound editor	Sohail Najmi	Hum Se Hai Zamana
Best comedian	Irfan Khoosat	Hum Se Hai Zamana
Special award	Saqi	For 30 years of excellence
Special award	Kaveeta	Jeenay Nahin Doon Gi
Special award	Faisal	Naraz
Best foreign male performer	Shiva	Hum Se Hai Zamana
Best foreign female performer	Rozina	Hum Se Hai Zamana

=== For Punjabi films ===
Award	Awardee	Film
Best Film		Dhee Rani
Best Director	Altaf Hussain	Dhee Rani
Best script writer	Bashir Niaz	Dhee Rani
Best actor	Ghulam Mohiuddin	Wadera
Best actress	Mumtaz	Dhee Rani
Best Supporting Actor	Talish	Dhee Rani
Best supporting actress	Arifa Siddiqui	Kismat
Best musician	M. Ashraf	Dhee Rani

=== For television ===
Award	Awardee	Program
Best Drama		Ana
Best Writer	Fatima Surayya Bajia	Ana
Best Actor	Zulqarnain Haider	
Best Newscaster (U)	Khalid Hameed	PTV
Best Newscaster (E)	Shaista Zaid	PTV
Best Compere	Khushbakht Shujaat	Chehray

== 1986 ==
=== For Urdu films ===
Award	Awardee	Film
Best Film		Hum Ek Hain
Best Director	Iqbal Kashmiri	Hum Ek Hain
Best script writer	Jaffar Arash	Hum Ek Hain
Best screenplay	Bashir Niaz and S. Sajid	Hum Ek Hain
Best actor	Nadeem	Faisla
Best actress	Babra Sharif	Miss Bangkok
Best Supporting Actor	Talat Hussain	Miss Bangkok
Best supporting actress	Arifa Siddiqui	Qatil Ki Talaash
Best musician	Nisar Bazmi	Hum Ek Hain
Best Lyricist	Habib Jalib	Hum Ek Hain
Best cinematographer	Sarwar Gul	Faisla
Best playback female singer	Humaira Channa	Hum Ek Hain
Best playback male singer	Akhlaq Ahmed	Qatil Ki Talaash
Best Film editor	K.D. Mirza	Faisla
Best sound editor	M. Saeed	Faisla
Best comedian	Rangeela	Baghi Qaidi
Best foreign male performer	Shiva	Hum Ek Hain
Best foreign female performer	Sabita	Ruby

=== For Punjabi films ===
Award	Awardee	Film
Best Film		Qismet
Best Director	Haider Chaudhary	Qismet
Best script writer	Nasir Adeeb	Ye Adam
Best actor	Afzal Ahmad	Ye Adam
Best actress	Anjuman	Qismet
Best musician	M. Ashraf	Qismet
Best art director	Jamal Saifi	Qismet

=== For television ===
Award	Awardee	Program
Best Producer	Shehzad Khalil	Tanhaiyaan
Best Actress	Marina Khan	Tanhaiyaan
Best Actor	Abid Ali	Hazaron Raaste
Best Writer	Mustansar Hussain Tarar	Hazaron Raaste
Best Newscaster (U)	Ishrat Fatima	PTV News
Best Newscaster (E)	Jehan Ara Moeen	PTV News

== 1987 ==
=== For Urdu films ===
Award	Awardee	Film
Best Film		Choron Ki Barat
Best Director	Iqbal Kashmiri	Choron Ki Barat
Best script writer	Amjad Islam Amjad	Choron Ki Barat
Best screenplay	Amjad Islam Amjad	Choron Ki Barat
Best actor	Nadeem	Choron Ki Barat
Best actress	Babra Sharif	Kundan
Best Supporting Actor	Abid Ali	Sonay Ki Talaash
Best supporting actress	Neeli	Qasam Munney Ki
Best musician	Kamal Ahmed	Kundan
Best Lyricist	Habib Jalib	Choron Ki Barat
Best cinematographer	Jan Mohammad	Manilla Ki Bijlian
Best playback female singer	Mehnaz	Kundan
Best playback male singer	Akhlaq Ahmed	Kundan
Best comedian	Umer Sharif	Kundan

=== For Punjabi films ===
Award	Awardee	Film
Best Film		Dulari
Best Director	Haider Chudhary	Dulari
Best script writer	Bashir Niaz	Dulari
Best actor	Sultan Rahi	Dulari
Best actress	Anjuman	Dulari
Best musician	M. Ashraf	Dulari

=== For television ===
Award	Awardee	Program
Best Producer	Sahira Kazmi	Dhoop Kinaray
Best Actor	Rahat Kazmi	Dhoop Kinaray
Best Writer	Haseena Moin	Dhoop Kinaray
Best Actress	Saba Parvez	Aasman
Best Newscaster (U)	Zubair-ud-din	PTV
Best Newscaster (E)	Nahid Anwar	PTV
Best Compere	Naeem Bukhari	Jehan Numa
Best Special Compere	Saleem Tahir	Main Aur Aap

== 1988 ==
=== For Urdu films ===
Award	Awardee	Film
Best Film		Bazar-e-Husan
Best Director	Javed Fazil	Bazar-e-Husan
Best script writer	Pervaiz Malik	Gharibon Ka Baadshah
Best screenplay	Fiaz Hashmi	Gharibon Ka Baadshah
Best actor	Javed Sheikh	Gharibon Ka Baadshah
Best actress	Salma Agha	Bazar-e-Husan
Best Child Star	Jamshaid Habib	Masoom Gawah
Best musician	M. Ashraf	Bazar-e-Husan
Best Lyricist	Ahmed Rahi	Bazar-e-Husan
Best cinematographer	M. Ayub	Aag Hi Aag
Best playback male singer	A. Nayyar	Gharibon Ka Baadshah
Best comedian	Abid Kashmiri	Bazar-e-Husan

=== For Punjabi films ===
Award	Awardee	Film
Best Film		Mukhra
Best Director	Iqbal Kashmiri	Mukhra
Best script writer	Bashir Niaz	Mukhra
Best actor	Nadeem	Mukhra
Best actress	Babra Sharif	Mukhra
Best supporting actress	Samina Peerzada	Mukhra
Best musician	Wajhat Attre	Mukhra
Best playback female singer	Mehnaz	Mukhra

=== For television ===
Award	Awardee	Program
Best Director	Shehzad Khalil	Saya
Best Writer	Zakia Akbar	Saya
Best Compere	Nazia Hassan	Dhanak
Best Compere	Dildar Pervaiz Bhatti	Mela
Best Compere	Himayat Ali Shair	Aqeedat Ka Safar
Best Newscaster	Shazia Zaheer	PTV
Best Newscaster	Abdus Salam	PTV
Best Announcer	Fareeda Abbasi	PTV Karachi

== 1989 ==
=== For Urdu films ===
Award	Awardee	Film
Best Film	Rafiq Rizvi	Shaani
Best Director	Saeed Rizvi	Shaani
Best script writer	Razia Butt	Mohabbat Ho To Aisi
Best screenplay	Agha Nazir	Shaani
Best actor	Nadeem	Barood Ki Chahoon
Best actress	Kaveeta	Barood Ki Chahoon
Best Supporting Actor	Asif Khan	Shaani
Best supporting actress	Neelo	Barood Ki Chahoon
Best musician	M. Ashraf	Roop Ki Rani
Best Lyricist	Hakim Nasir	Dushmano Ka Dushman
Best playback female singer	Humaira Channa	Dushmano Ka Dushman
Best playback male singer	A. Nayyar	Taqat Ka Toofan
Best comedian	Umar Sharif	Barood Ki Chahoon
Best comedian	Saeed Rizvi	Shaani

=== For Punjabi films ===
Award	Awardee	Film
Best Film		Madam Bawari
Best Director	Nazarul Islam	Madam Bawari
Best actor	Sultan Rahi	Kalka
Best script writer	Bashir Niaz	Zakhmi Aurat
Best actor	Javed Sheikh	Baarish
Best actress	Neeli	Madam Bawari
Best musician	Zulfiqar Ali	Tees Mar Khan

=== For television ===
Award	Awardee	Program
Best Producer	Sultana Siddiqui	Music program
Best Writer	Hameed Kashmiri	
Best Writer	Asghar Nadeem Syed	Pyas
Best Actress	Shakila Qureshi	Pyas
Best Producer	Nusrat Thhakur	Pyas
Best Newscaster	Qurat-ul-Ain Ali	PTV
Best Newscater	Azhar Lodhi	PTV

== 1990 ==
=== For Urdu films ===
Award	Awardee	Film
Best Film		Insaniyat Kay Dushman
Best Director	Hasnain	Insaniyat Kay Dushman
Best script writer	Adeeb	Insaniyat Kay Dushman
Best screenplay	Syed Noor	Bulandi
Best actor	Javed Sheikh	Ustadon Ke Ustad
Best actress	Anjuman	Insaniyat Kay Dushman
Best Supporting Actor	Afzal Ahmed	Bulandi
Best supporting actress	Samina Pirzada	Bulandi
Best musician	Kamal Ahmed	Aasman
Best Lyricist	Masroor Anwar	Bulandi
Best cinematographer	Saleem But	Insaniyat Kay Dushman
Best playback female singer	Mehnaz	Bulandi
Best playback male singer	Akhlaq Ahmed	Bulandi

=== For Punjabi films ===
Award	Awardee	Film
Best Film		Hoshyar
Best Director	Haider Chudhary	Hoshyar
Best script writer	Haider Chudhary	Hoshyar
Best actor	Nadeem	Gorian Dian Jhangra
Best actress	Babra Sharif	Gorian Dian Jhangra
Best Supporting Actor	Huyamoon Qureshi	Hoshyar
Best supporting actress	Munaza Sheikh	Sheer Dil
Best musician	Wajhat Attre	Gorian Dian Jhangra
Best Lyricist	Waris Ludhanvi	Gorian Dian Jhangra
Best comedian	Albela	Hoshyar

=== For television ===
Award	Awardee	Program
Best Producer	Sahira Kazmi	Hawa Ki Beti
Best Writer	Noor-ul-Huda Shah	Hawa Ki Beti
Best Producer	Iqbal Ansari	Sung Chor
Best Sindhi Actor	Noor Muhammad Lashari	PTV
Best Newscater	Nahid Anwar	PTV

== 1991 ==
=== For Urdu films ===
Award	Awardee	Film
Best Film		Watan Kay Rakhwalay
Best Director	Hasnain	Watan Kay Rakhwalay
Best script writer	Pervaiz Kalim	Watan Kay Rakhwalay
Best screenplay	Pervaiz Kalim	Watan Kay Rakhwalay
Best actor	Nadeem	Watan Kay Rakhwalay
Best actress	Nadira	Watan Kay Rakhwalay
Best Supporting Actor	Ghulam Mohiuddin	Zid
Best supporting actress		
Best musician	Kamal Ahmed	Aandhi
Best Lyricist	Habib Jalib	Watan Kay Rakhwalay
Best cinematographer	Babar Bilal	Watan Kay Rakhwalay
Best playback female singer	Humaira Channa	Watan Kay Rakhwalay
Best playback male singer		

=== For Punjabi films ===
Award	Awardee	Film
Best Film		Bakhtawar
Best Director	Iqbal Kashmiri	Bakhtawar
Best script writer	Tanveer Kazmi	Bakhtawar
Best actor	Javed Sheikh	Kalay Choor
Best actress	Neeli	Bakhtawar
Best Supporting Actor	Badar Munir	Teen Yake Teen Chake
Best supporting actress	Saima	Bakhtawar
Best musician	M. Ashraf	Chiragh Bali
Best Lyricist	Waris Ludhanvi	Chiragh Bali
Best playback female singer	Noor Jehan	Chiragh Bali
Best comedian	Rangeela	Teen Yake Teen Chake

== 1992 ==
=== For Urdu films ===
Award	Awardee	Film
Best Film	Umer Sharif	Mr. 420
Best Director	Umer Sharif	Mr. 420
Best script writer	Umer Sharif	Mr. 420
Best screenplay	Umer Sharif	Mr. 420
Best actor	Umer Sharif	Mr. 420
Best actress	Rubi Niazi	Mr. 420
Best Supporting Actor	Arshad Mehmood	Aaj Aur Kal
Best supporting actress	Zoya Butt	Aaj Aur Kal
Best musician	Kamal Ahmed	Aaj Ka Daur
Best Lyricist	Masroor Anwar	Aaj Ka Daur
Best cinematographer	M. Ayub	Aaj Ka Daur
Best playback female singer	Tarannum Naz	Aaj Ka Daur
Best playback male singer	Arshad Mehmood	Aaj Ka Daur

=== For Punjabi films ===
Award	Awardee	Film
Best Film		Chahat
Best Director	Hasnain	Chahat
Best script writer	Bashir Niaz	Chahat
Best actor	Sultan Rahi	Majhoo
Best actress	Anjuman	Majhoo
Best Supporting Actor	Humayun Qureshi	Majhoo
Best supporting actress	Shahida Mini	Chahat
Best musician	M. Ashraf	Majhoo
Best Lyricist	Khawaja Pervaiz	Chahat
Best playback female singer	Noor Jehan	Majhoo

== 1993 ==
=== For Urdu films ===
Award	Awardee	Film
Best Film	Shamim Khurshid	Hathi Mere Sathi
Best Director	Shamim Ara	Hathi Mere Sathi
Best script writer	Pervaiz Kaleem	Gunaah
Best screenplay	Pervaiz Kaleem	Gunaah
Best actor	Umer Sharif	Mr. Charlie
Best actress	Reema	Hathi Mere Sathi
Best Supporting Actor	Aurangzeb Leghari	Qasam
Best supporting actress	Kanwal Nauman	Qasam
Best musician	Wajid Ali Nashad	Hathi Mere Sathi
Best Lyricist	Saeed Gilani	Hathi Mere Sathi
Best cinematographer	Babar Bilal	Qasam
Best playback female singer	Humaira Channa	Gunaah
Best playback male singer	Sajjad Ali	Hathi Mere Sathi
Best comedian	Ismail Tara	Hathi Mere Sathi

=== For Punjabi films ===
Award	Awardee	Film
Best Film		Insayniat
Best Director	Hasnain	Insayniat
Best script writer	Nasir Adeeb	Khuda Gawah
Best actor	Javed Sheikh	Zamana
Best actress	Neeli	Zamana
Best Supporting Actor	Irfan Khoosat	Johtay Raees
Best supporting actress	Bahar	Zamana
Best musician	M. Ashraf	Insayniat
Best Lyricist	Khawaja Pervaiz	Insayniat
Best playback female singer	Shamsa Kanwal	Zamana
Best playback male singer	Ghulam Abbas	Insayniat

== 1994 ==
=== For Urdu films ===
Award	Awardee	Film
Best Film		Sarkata Insaan
Best Director	Shamim Ara	Aakhri Mujra
Best script writer	Mazhar Anjum	Aakhri Mujra
Best screenplay	Mazhar Anjum	Aakhri Mujra
Best actor	Ghulam Mohiuddin	Sarkata Insaan
Best actress	Neeli	Aakhri Mujra
Best Supporting Actor	Talish	Aakhri Mujra
Best supporting actress	Nayyar Sultana	Sarkata Insaan
Best musician	Wajid Ali Nashad	Aakhri Mujra
Best Lyricist	Qateel Shifai	Sarkata Insaan
Best cinematographer	Saeed Rizvi	Sarkata Insaan
Best playback female singer	Humaira Channa	Aakhri Mujra
Best playback male singer	Tehseen Javed	Sarkata Insaan
Best comedian	Ismail Tara	Aakhri Mujra

=== For Punjabi films ===
Award	Awardee	Film
Best Film		Rani Beeti Raj Karaygi
Best Director	Altaf Husain	Rani Beeti Raj Karaygi
Best script writer	Bashir Niaz	Rani Beeti Raj Karaygi
Best actor	Yousuf Khan	Buat Shikan
Best actress	Reema	Rani Beeti Raj Karaygi
Best Supporting Actor	Huymoon Qureshi	Khandan
Best supporting actress	Bahar	Zameen Aasman
Best musician	M. Ashraf	Aakhri Mujra
Best Lyricist	Khawaja Pervaiz	Aakhri Mujra
Best playback female singer	Shamsa Kanwal	Rani Beeti Raj Karraygi
Best playback male singer	Ghulam Abbas	Rani Beeti Raj Karraygi

== 1995 ==
=== For Urdu films ===
Award	Awardee	Film
Best Film	Syed Noor	Sargam
Best Director	Syed Noor	Sargam
Best script writer	Syed Noor	Sargam
Best screenplay	Dabeerul Hasan	Munda Bigra Jaiy
Best actor	Javed Sheikh	Mushkil
Best actress	Zeba Bakhtiar	Sargam
Best Supporting Actor	Mahraj Ghulam Hussain	Sargam
Best supporting actress	Zeba Shehnaz	Munda Bigra Jaiy
Best musician	Adnan Sami Khan	Sargam
Best Lyricist	Riaz-ur-Rahman Saghir	Sargam
Best cinematographer	Waqar Bukhari	Mushkil
Best playback female singer	Hadiqa Kiyani	Sargam
Best playback male singer	Anwar Rafi	Jeeva
Best comedian	Ismail Tara	Munda Bigra Jaiy

=== For Punjabi films ===
Award	Awardee	Film
Best Film		Jungle Ka Qanoon
Best Director	Masood Butt	Jungle Ka Qanoon
Best script writer	Nasir Adeeb	Jungle Ka Qanoon
Best actor	Sultan Rahi	Gubbar Singh
Best actress	Reema	Jungle Ka Qanoon
Best Supporting Actor	Huymoon Qureshi	Jungle Ka Qanoon
Best supporting actress	Nargis	Madam Rani
Best musician	M. Ashraf	Jungle Ka Qanoon
Best Lyricist	Khawaja Pervaiz	Jungle Ka Qanoon
Best cinematographer	Masood Butt	Madam Rani
Best playback female singer	Saira Naseem	Jungle Ka Qanoon
Best playback male singer	Ghulam Abbas	Jungle Ka Qanoon

=== For television ===
Award	Awardee	Film
Best Director	Taj Dar Alam	Drama Serial Chand Grehan

== 1996 ==
=== For Urdu films ===
Award	Awardee	Film
Best Film		Hawaen
Best Director	Syed Noor	Hawaen
Best script writer	Rukhsana Noor	Hawaen
Best screenplay	Syed Noor	Hawaen
Best actor	Saud	Hawaen
Best actress	Meera	Khilona
Best Supporting Actor	Ali Aijaz	Khilona
Best supporting actress	Andaleeb	Ghunghat
Best musician	Amjad Bobby	Ghunghat
Best Lyricist	Riaz-ur-Rahman Saghir	Ghunghat
Best cinematographer	Waqar Bukhari	Chief Sahib
Best playback female singer	Shazia Manzoor and Saira Nasim	Chor Machaaey Shor
Best playback male singer	Arshad Mehmood	Ghunghat
Best comedian	Ismail Tara	Chief Sahib

=== For Punjabi films ===
Award	Awardee	Film
Best Film		Sakahi Badshah
Best Director	Masood Butt	Sakahi Badshah
Best script writer	Nasir Adeeb	Sakahi Badshah
Best actor	Izhar Qazi	Sakahi Badshah
Best actress	Saima	Sakahi Badshah
Best Supporting Actor	Huymoon Qureshi	Sakahi Badshah
Best supporting actress	Neeli	Sakahi Badshah
Best musician	Taffu	Sakahi Badshah
Best cinematographer	Masood Butt	Sakahi Badshah

== 1997 ==
=== For Urdu films ===
Award	Awardee	Film
Best Film		Deewane Tere Pyar Ke
Best Director	Syed Noor	Deewane Tere Pyar Ke
Best script writer	Syed Noor	Deewane Tere Pyar Ke
Best screenplay	Khalilur Rehman Qamar	Karaz
Best actor	Shaan	Sangam
Best actress	Neeli	Mard Jeenay Nahi Dete
Best Supporting Actor	Ghulam Mohiuddin	Karz
Best supporting actress	Sana	Sangam
Best musician	Amjad Bobby	Deewane Tere Pyar Ke
Best Lyricist	Rukhsana Noor	Sangam
Best cinematographer	Aakif Malik	Deewane Tere Pyar Ke
Best playback female singer	Humaira Channa	Sangam
Best playback male singer	Anwar Rafi	Dil Kisi Ka Dost Nahi
Best comedian	Sardar Kamal	Deewane Tere Pyar Ke

=== For Punjabi films ===
Award	Awardee	Film
Best Film		Kala Raj
Best Director	Faiz Malik	Kala Raj
Best script writer	Nasir Adeeb	Kala Raj
Best actor	Izhar Qazi	Kala Raj
Best actress	Reema	Kala Raj
Best Supporting Actor	Shafqat Cheema	Kala Raj
Best supporting actress	Nargis	Kala Raj
Best musician	Wajaht Attre	Sukan
Best Lyricist	Saeed Gilani	Kala Raj
Best playback female singer	Azra Jehan	Loharia

== 1998 ==
=== For Urdu films ===
Award	Awardee	Film
Best Film		Nikah
Best Director	Sangeeta	Nikah
Best script writer	Pervaiz Kalim	Nikah
Best screenplay	Syed Noor	Zaiwar
Best actor	Shaan	Nikah
Best actress	Reema	Nikah
Best Supporting Actor	Sohail Khan	Deewarain
Best supporting actress	Sahiba	Zaiver
Best musician	Nisar Bazmi	Very Good Duniya Very Bad Log
Best Lyricist	Masroor Anwar	Very Good Duniya Very Bad Log
Best cinematographer	Riaz Butt	Nikah
Best playback female singer	Shazia Manzoor	Very Good Duniya Very Bad Log
Best playback male singer	Anwar Rafi	Very Good Duniya Very Bad Log
Best comedian	Ismail Tara	Deewarain

=== For Punjabi films ===
Award	Awardee	Film
Best Film		Choorian
Best Director	Syed Noor	Choorian
Best script writer	Rukhsana Noor	Choorian
Best actor	Moammar Rana	Choorian
Best actress	Saima	Choorian
Best Supporting Actor	Shafqat Cheema	Choorian
Best supporting actress	Erum Tahir	Pardeesi
Best musician	Zulfiqar Ali	Choorian
Best Lyricist	Masroor Anwar	Choorian
Best cinematographer	Naseeruddin	Choorian
Best playback female singer	Saira Naseem	Choorian
Best playback male singer	Ameer Ali	Choorian

=== For Television Serial ===
Award	Awardee	Film
Best Director	Tajdar Alam	Drama Serial, Rahi-The Great

== 1999 ==
=== For Urdu films ===
Award	Awardee	Film
Best Film		Jannat Ki Talash
Best Director	Hassan Askari	Jannat Ki Talash
Best script writer	Navees Pervaiz	Jannat Ki Talash
Best screenplay	Syed Noor	Daku Rani
Best actor	Shaan	Jannat Ki Talash
Best actress	Resham	Jannat Ki Talash
Best Supporting Actor	Javed Sheikh	Guns and Roses
Best supporting actress	Sana	Jannat Ki Talash
Best musician	Waqar Ali	Ek Aur Love Story
Best Lyricist	Ahmed Faraz	Jannat Ki Talash
Best cinematographer	Waqar Bukhari	Guns and Roses
Best choreographer		Guns and Roses
Best playback female singer	Mehnaz	Jannat Ki Talash
Best playback male singer	Asif Mehdi	Jannat Ki Talash
Best Film editor	Z.A. Zulfi	Daku Rani
Best art director	Tanveer Malik	Guns and Roses
Best sound editor		Mujhe Jeenay Do
Best comedian		
Special award	Muhammad Ali	Millennium Award (Nigar Awards)
Special award	Zeba	Millennium award
Special award	Nadeem	Millennium award
Special award	Bahar Begum	Millennium award
Special award	Qateel Shifai	Millennium award
Special award	Badar Munir	Millennium award
Special award	Umer Sharif	Millennium award
Special award	Rangeela	Millennium award
Special award	Sabiha Khanum	Millennium award
Special award	Neelo	Millennium award
Special award	Nusret Fateh Ali Khan	Millennium award
Special award	Mehdi Hassan	Millennium award
Special award	Noor Jehan	Millennium award
Special award	Ali Sufyan Afaqi	Millennium award
Special award	Shamim Ara	Ilyas Rashidi Gold Medal
Special award	Anjuman	
Special award	Meera	
Special award	Shehzad Roy	

=== For Punjabi films ===
Award	Awardee	Film
Best Film		Nikki Jaee Haan
Best Director	Masood Butt	Nikki Jaee Haan
Best script writer	Babar Kashmiri	Nikki Jaee Haan
Best actor	Moammar Rana	Nikki Jaee Haan
Best actress	Reema	Nikki Jaee Haan
Best Supporting Actor	Abid Ali	Nikki Jaee Haan
Best supporting actress	Laila	Nikki Jaee Haan
Best musician	Zulfiqar Ali	Nikki Jaee Haan
Best Lyricist	Ahmed Rahi	Nikki Jaee Haan
Best cinematographer	Pervaiz Khan	Chaudrani
Best choreographer		Nikki Jaee Haan
Best playback female singer	Azra Jehan	Nikki Jaee Haan

== 2000 ==
=== For Urdu films ===
Award	Awardee	Film
Best Film	Shehzad Gul	Tere Pyar Mein
Best Director	Hassan Askari	Tere Pyar Mein
Best script writer	Raja Aziz Khan	Tere Pyar Mein
Best screenplay	Rashid Sajid and Mazhar Anjum	Tere Pyar Mein
Best actor	Shaan Shahid	Tere Pyar Mein
Best actress	Zara Sheikh	Tere Pyar Mein
Best Supporting Actor	Raza Riaz	Tere Pyar Mein
Best supporting actress	Atiqa Odho	Mujhe Chand Chahiye
Best musician	Ronaq Ali and Sajid Ali	Mujhe Chand Chahiye
Best Lyricist	Riaz-ur-Rehman Saghir	Mujhe Chand Chahiye
Best cinematographer	Waqar Bukhar and Faisal Bukhari	Mujhe Chand Chahiye
Best choreographer	Pappu Samrat	Mujhe Chand Chahiye
Best playback female singer	Saima Jehan	Mujhe Chand Chahiye
Best playback male singer	Waris Baig	Mujhe Chand Chahiye
Best Film editor	Zulfi	Tere Pyar Mein
Best art director	Tanweer Fatima	Mujhe Chand Chahiye
Best sound editor	Afzal Hussain	Tere Pyar Mein
Best comedian		
Special award	Sabiha Khanum	Honorary gold medal awarded
Special award	Kamal	Lifetime achievement award
Special award	Naghma	Lifetime achievement award
Special award	Reema	Mujhe Chand Chahiye

=== For Punjabi films ===
Award	Awardee	Film
Best Film		Mehndi Waley Hath
Best Director	Syed Noor	Mehndi Waley Hath
Best script writer	Rukhsana Noor	Mehndi Waley Hath
Best actor	Moammar Rana	Mehndi Waley Hath
Best actress	Saima	Mehndi Waley Hath
Best Supporting Actor	Shafqat Cheema	Mehndi Waley Hath
Best supporting actress	Nargis	Long Da Lashkara
Best musician	Zulfiqar Ali and Altaf Haider	Mehndi Waley Hath
Best Lyricist	Rukhsana Noor	Mehndi Waley Hath
Best cinematographer	Ali Jan	Mehndi Waley Hath
Best playback female singer	Saira Naseem	Mehndi Waley Hath
Special award	Babar Ali	Mehndi Waley Hath

== 2001 ==
=== For Urdu films ===
Award	Awardee	Film
Best Film	Saqib Khan	Khoey Ho Tum Kahan
Best Director	Ajab Gul	Khoey Ho Tum Kahan
Best script writer	Ajab Gul	Khoey Ho Tum Kahan
Best screenplay	Zubair Khan	Khoey Ho Tum Kahan
Best actor	Ajab Gul	Khoey ho tum kahan
Best actress	Meera	Khoey Ho Tum Kahan
Best Film editor	Z.A. Zulfi	
Best playback female singer	Saira Naseem	Rukhsati
Best playback male singer	Zain	Khoey Ho Tum Kahan

== 2002 ==
=== For Urdu films ===
Award	Winner	Film
Best Film	Akbar Khan	Yeh Dil Aap Ka Hua
Best Director	Javed Sheikh	Yeh Dil Aap Ka Hua
Best script writer	Babar Kashmiri	Yeh Dil Aap Ka Hua
Best actor	Moammar Rana	Yeh Dil Aap Ka Hua
Best actress	Sana	Yeh Dil Aap Ka Hua
Best Supporting Actor	Saleem Sheikh	Yeh Dil Aap Ka Hua
Best supporting actress	Veena Malik	Yeh Dil Aap Ka Hua
Best musician	Amjad Bobby	Yeh Dil Aap Ka Hua
Special award	Waheed Murad	Legend awards
Special award	Habib	Lifetime achievement award
Special award	Bahar Begum	Lifetime achievement award
Special award	Ghulam Mohiuddin	Lifetime achievement award
Special award	Shaheen Bano	Ilyas Rashidi gold medal
Special award	Nadeem Baig	Ilyas Rashidi gold medal
Best playback female singer	Humera Channa	"Manila Kay Jasoos"
Best playback male singer	Tauseef Dar	"Daku"

== See also ==
- Nigar Awards
- Nigar magazine
- Lux Style Awards
