= Nigar Award for Best Actress =

Nigar Awards for Best Actress
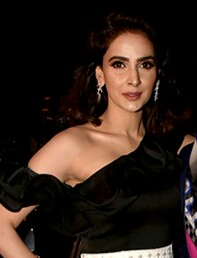
- The 2017/last recipient: Saba Qamar
- Awarded for: Best performance by an actress in a leading role
- Country: Pakistan
- Presented by: Nigar
- First award: Sabiha Khanum, Saat Lakh (1957)
- Currently held by: Saba Qamar, Lahore Se Aagey (2017)

The Nigar Award for Best Actress, also known as Nigar Public Film Award for Best Actress, is an award constituted for the cinema of Pakistan to recognise contribution of a lead actress in Lollywood. Established in 1958 by Ilyas Rashidi, it is presented annually by Nigar magazine as part of its annual ceremony of Nigar Awards. The award ceremony takes place independently and is not associated with government or for-profit entities such as production house or television channel.

First presented in 1957, the first Best Actress award was given to Sabiha Khanum for Saat Lakh (1957). The last award was given to Saba Qamar in 2017 for Lahore Se Aagey.

== Multiple winners ==
- 10 Wins: Shabnam
- 7 Wins: Babra Sharif
- 6 Wins: Anjuman
- 6 Wins: Reema Khan
- 5 Wins: Neeli
- 4 Wins: Shamim Ara
- 4 Wins: Mumtaz
- 3 Wins: Zeba
- 3 Wins: Neelo
- 3 Wins: Musarrat Nazir
- 3 Wins: Saima Noor
- 2 Wins: Sabiha Khanum
- 2 Wins: Nayyar Sultana
- 2 Wins: Meera
- 2 Wins: Firdous Begum
- 2 Wins: Mustafa Qureshi
- 2 Wins: Umer Shareef

== Winners and nominees ==
Table key
‡	Indicates the winner

=== 1950s ===
Year	Photos of winners	Actor	Role(s)	Film	Ref(s)
1957 (1st)		Sabiha Khanam ‡	N/A	Saat Lakh	
1958 (2nd)	—N/a	Musarrat Nazir ‡	Sanwali	Zeher-e-Ishq	
1959 (3rd)	—N/a	Musarrat Nazir ‡	Shadaan	Jhoomer	

=== 1960s ===
Year	Photos of winners	Actor	Role(s)	Film	Ref(s)
1960 (4th)		Nayyar Sultana ‡	Razia	Saheli	
1961 (5th)	—N/a	Musarrat Nazir ‡	Laila	Shaheed	
1962 (6th)		Nayyar Sultana ‡	Tayyaba	Aulad	
1963 (7th)		Sabiha Khanum ‡	Ismat	Shikwa	
1964 (8th)		Shamim Ara ‡	Gul	Farangi	
1965 (9th)		Shamim Ara ‡	Naila	Naila	
1966 (10th)		Zeba ‡	Najma	Armaan	
1967 (11th)		Shamim Ara ‡	Shakuntla	Lakhon Mein Aik	
1968 (12th)		Shamim Ara ‡	Saiqa	Saiqa	
1969 (13th)		Neelo ‡	Zarqa	Zarqa	

=== 1970s ===
Year	Photos of winners	Actress	Role(s)	Film	Ref(s)
Awards are also presented to Punjabi language films since 1970
1970 (14th)	—N/a	Zeba ‡	N/A	Insaan aur Aadmi (1970)	
1970 (14th)	—N/a	Firdous Begum ‡	Heer	Heer Ranjha	
1971 (15th)		Shabnum ‡	Rani	Dosti	
1971 (15th)		Rani ‡	N/A	Babul	
1972 (16th)	—N/a	Zeba ‡	N/A	Mohabbat	
1972 (16th)	—N/a	Aliya Begum ‡	N/A	Zulm Da Badla	
1973 (17th)		Shabnum ‡	Bano	Anmol	
1973 (17th)	—N/a	Firdous Begum ‡	N/A	Ziddi	
1974 (18th)		Shabnum ‡	Najma	Dillagi	
1974 (18th)	—N/a	Neelo ‡	N/A	Khatarnaak	
1975 (19th)		Shabnum ‡	Nargis/ Zeenat	Zeenat	
1975 (19th)	—N/a	Mumtaz ‡	N/A	Jadoo	
1976 (20th)	—N/a	Babra Sharif ‡	Shabana/ Farzana	Shabana	
1976 (20th)	—N/a	Neelo ‡	N/A	Jat Kurian Taun Darda	
1977 (21st)		Shabnum ‡	Rita	Aina	
1977 (21st)		Aasia ‡	N/A	Qanoon	
1978 (22nd)	—N/a	Sangeeta ‡	Rano	Mutthi Bhar Chawal	
1978 (22nd)	—N/a	Najma ‡	N/A	Shola	
1979 (23rd)		Shabnum ‡	N/A	Pakeeza (1979)	
1979 (23rd)	—N/a	Mumtaz ‡	N/A	Nizam Daku (1979)	

=== 1980s ===
Year	Photos of winners	Actress	Role(s)	Film	Ref(s)
1980 (24th)		Shabnam ‡	N/A	Hum Dono (1980)	
1980 (24th)	—N/a	Mumtaz ‡	N/A	Sohra Te Jawai (1980)	
1981 (25th)		Shabnam ‡	N/A	Qurbani (1981)	
1981 (25th)	—N/a	Anjuman ‡	N/A	Sher Khan (1981)	
1982 (26th)	—N/a	Babra Sharif ‡	N/A	Sangdil (1982)	
1982 (26th)	—N/a	Anjuman ‡	N/A	Do Bigha Zameen (1982)	
1983 (27th)	—N/a	Shabnam ‡	N/A	Kabhi Alvida Na Kehna (1983)	
1983 (27th)		Rani ‡	N/A	Sona Chandi (1983)	
1984 (28th)	—N/a	Babra Sharif ‡	N/A	Miss Colombo (1984)	
1984 (28th)	—N/a	Durdana Rehman ‡	N/A	Ishq Nachaway Gali Gali (1984)	
1985 (29th)		Shabnam ‡	N/A	Naraaz (1985)	
1985 (29th)	—N/a	Mumtaz ‡	N/A	Dhee Rani (1985)	
1986 (30th)	—N/a	Babra Sharif ‡	N/A	Miss Bangkok (1986)	
1986 (30th)	—N/a	Anjuman ‡	N/A	Qismet (1986)	
1987 (31st)	—N/a	Babra Sharif ‡	N/A	Kundan (1987)	
1987 (31st)	—N/a	Anjuman ‡	N/A	Dulari (1987)	
1988 (32nd)	—N/a	Salma Agha ‡	Gori	Bazar-e-Husn	
1988 (32nd)	—N/a	Babra Sharif ‡	N/A	Mukhra	
1989 (33rd)	—N/a	Kaveeta ‡	N/A	Barood Ki Chahoon (1989)	
1989 (33rd)	—N/a	Neeli ‡	N/A	Madam Bawari (1989)	

=== 1990s ===
Year	Photos of winners	Actor	Role(s)	Film	Ref(s)
1990 (34th)	—N/a	Anjuman ‡	Miss Rita	Insaniyat Kay Dushman	
1990 (34th)	—N/a	Babra Sharif ‡	N/A	Gorian Dian Jhangra (1990)	
1991 (35th)	—N/a	Nadira ‡	Miss Sherin	Watan Kay Rakhwalay	
1991 (35th)	—N/a	Neeli ‡	N/A	Bakhtawar	
1992 (36th)	—N/a	Rubi Niazi ‡	N/A	Mr. 420 (1992)	
1992 (36th)	—N/a	Anjuman ‡	N/A	Majhoo (1992)	
1993 (37th)	—N/a	Reema Khan ‡	N/A	Haathi Mere Saathi	
1993 (37th)	—N/a	Neeli ‡	N/A	Zamana	
1994 (38th)	—N/a	Neeli ‡	Sitara	Aakhri Mujra (1994)	
1994 (38th)	—N/a	Reema Khan ‡	N/A	Rani Beti Raaj Kare Gi (1994)	
1995 (39th)		Zeba Bakhtiar ‡	N/A	Sargam	
1995 (39th)	—N/a	Reema Khan ‡	N/A	Jungle Ka Qanoon (1995)	
1996 (40th)		Meera ‡	N/A	Khilona (1996)	
1996 (40th)	—N/a	Saima Noor ‡	N/A	Sakahi Badshah (1996)	
1997 (41st)	—N/a	Neeli ‡	N/A	Mujhe Jeene Nahi Dete (1997)	
1997 (41st)	—N/a	Reema Khan ‡	N/A	Kala Raj (1997)	
1998 (42nd)	—N/a	Reema Khan ‡	Bisma	Nikah	
1998 (42nd)	—N/a	Saima Noor ‡	Billo	Choorian	
1999 (43rd)	—N/a	Resham‡	Salma	Jannat Ki Talash	
1999 (43rd)	—N/a	Reema Khan ‡	N/A	Nikki Jaee Haan (1999)	

=== 2000s ===
Year	Photos of winners	Actor	Role(s)	Film	Ref(s)
2000 (45th)	—N/a	Zara Sheikh ‡	Preeti	Tere Pyar Mein	
2000 (45th)	—N/a	Saima Noor ‡	N/A	Mehndi Waley Hath (2000)	
2001 (46th)		Meera ‡	N/A	Khoey Ho Tum Kahan	
2002 (46th)		Sana Fakhar ‡	Sitara	Yeh Dil Aap Ka Huwa	
Not announced from 2003 to 2016
2017 (47th)		Saba Qamar ‡	Taara Ahmed	Lahore Se Aagey	
