= Nigar Award for Best Actor =

Award presented annually by Nigar magazine

Nigar Awards for Best Actor
- Awarded for: Best performance by an actor in a leading role
- Country: Pakistan
- Presented by: Nigar
- First award: Santosh Kumar, Waada (1957)
- Currently held by: Fahad Mustafa, Mah e Mir (2017)

The Nigar Award for Best Actor, also known as Nigar Public Film Award for Best Actor, is an award constituted for the cinema of Pakistan to recognise contribution of a lead actor in Lollywood. Established in 1958 by Ilyas Rashidi, it is presented annually by Nigar magazine as part of its annual ceremony of Nigar Awards. The award ceremony takes place independently and is not associated with any government or for-profit entities such as production house or television channel.

The first Best Actor award ceremony took place in 1957 and was given to Santosh Kumar for Waada (1957). The last award was given to Fahad Mustafa in 2017 for Actor in Law.

== Superlatives ==
| Superlative | Actor | Record |
|---|---|---|
| Actor with most awards | Nadeem | 17 |
| Actor with most consecutive awards | Nadeem (1967-91) | 17 |

== Multiple winners ==
- 17 Wins: Nadeem
- 8 Wins: Mohammad Ali
- 5 Wins: Sultan Rahi
- 5 Wins: Jawed Sheikh
- 4 Wins: Waheed Murad
- 4 Wins: Shaan Shahid
- 4 Wins: Moammar Rana
- 3 Wins: Santosh Kumar
- 2 Wins: Darpan
- 2 Wins: Habib
- 2 Wins: Sudhir
- 2 Wins: Ali Ejaz
- 2 Wins: Mustafa Qureshi
- 2 Wins: Umer Shareef
- 2 Wins: Izhar Qazi

== Winners and nominees ==
Table key
| ‡ | Indicates the winner |

=== 1950s ===
| Year | Photos of winners | Actor | Role(s) | Film | Ref(s) |
|---|---|---|---|---|---|
| 1957 (1st) | —N/a | Santosh Kumar ‡ | Santosh | Waada | |
| 1958 (2nd) | —N/a | Habib ‡ | Habib | Aadmi | |
| 1959 (3rd) | —N/a | Darpan ‡ | Darpan | Saathi (1959) | |

=== 1960s ===
| Year | Photos of winners | Actor | Role(s) | Film | Ref(s) |
|---|---|---|---|---|---|
| 1960 (4th) | | Darpan ‡ | Doctor | Saheli | |
| 1961 (5th) | —N/a | Habib ‡ | N/A | Surayya (1961) | |
| 1962 (6th) | | Santosh Kumar ‡ | Shahid | Ghunghat | |
| 1963 (7th) | | Santosh Kumar ‡ | N/A | Daman (1963) | |
| 1964 (8th) | | Waheed Murad ‡ | Donkey cart owner | Heera Aur Pathar | |
| 1965 (9th) | | Muhammad Ali ‡ | N/A | Kaneez | |
| 1966 (10th) | | Muhammad Ali ‡ | N/A | Aag Ka Darya (1966) | |
| 1967 (11th) | —N/a | Nadeem ‡ | N/A | Chakori | |
| 1968 (12th) | | Muhammad Ali ‡ | Anwer/Anu | Saiqa (1968) | |
| 1969 (13th) | | Waheed Murad ‡ | N/A | Andaleeb | |

=== 1970s ===
| Year | Photos of winners | Actor | Role(s) | Film | Ref(s) |
|---|---|---|---|---|---|
Awards are also presented to Punjabi language films since 1970
| 1970 (14th) | —N/a | Muhammad Ali ‡ | N/A | Insaan aur Aadmi (1970) | |
| 1970 (14th) | —N/a | Sudhir ‡ | N/A | Maa Putter (1970) | |
| 1971 (15th) | —N/a | Muhammad Ali ‡ | N/A | Wehshi (1971) | |
| 1971 (15th) | | Waheed Murad ‡ | N/A | Mastana Mahi (1971) | |
| 1972 (16th) | —N/a | Nadeem ‡ | N/A | Ehsas (1972) | |
| 1972 (16th) | —N/a | Sultan Rahi ‡ | N/A | Basheera (1972) | |
| 1973 (17th) | —N/a | Muhammad Ali ‡ | N/A | Aas (1973) | |
| 1973 (17th) | —N/a | Yousuf Khan ‡ | N/A | Ziddi | |
| 1974 (18th) | —N/a | Muhammad Ali ‡ | N/A | Aaina Aur Soorat (1974) | |
| 1974 (18th) | —N/a | Sudhir ‡ | N/A | Lottery (1974) | |
| 1975 (19th) | —N/a | Nadeem ‡ | N/A | Anari (1975) | |
| 1975 (19th) | —N/a | Sultan Rahi ‡ | N/A | Wehshi Jatt (1975) | |
| 1976 (20th) | —N/a | Shahid ‡ | N/A | Shabana | |
| 1976 (20th) | —N/a | Kamal ‡ | N/A | Jat Kurian Taun Darda (1976) | |
| 1977 (21st) | —N/a | Nadeem ‡ | N/A | Aina | |
| 1977 (21st) | —N/a | Yousuf Khan ‡ | N/A | Jabroo (1977) | |
| 1978 (22nd) | —N/a | Muhammad Ali ‡ | N/A | Haider Ali (1978) | |
| 1978 (22nd) | —N/a | Asif Khan ‡ | N/A | Shola (1978) | |
| 1979 (23rd) | —N/a | Nadeem ‡ | N/A | Pakeeza (1979) | |
| 1979 (23rd) | —N/a | Ali Ejaz ‡ | N/A | Dubai Chalo (1979) | |

=== 1980s ===
| Year | Photos of winners | Actor | Role(s) | Film | Ref(s) |
|---|---|---|---|---|---|
| 1980 (24th) | —N/a | Nadeem ‡ | N/A | Saima (1980) | |
| 1980 (24th) | —N/a | Ali Ejaz ‡ | N/A | Sohra Te Jawai (1980) | |
| 1981 (25th) | —N/a | Nadeem ‡ | N/A | Qurbani (1981) | |
| 1981 (25th) | —N/a | Mustafa Qureshi ‡ | N/A | Sher Khan (1981) | |
| 1982 (26th) | —N/a | Nadeem ‡ | N/A | Sangdil (1982) | |
| 1982 (26th) | —N/a | Ali Eijaz ‡ | N/A | Naukar Te Maalik (1982) | |
| 1983 (27th) | —N/a | Nadeem ‡ | N/A | Dehleez (1983) | |
| 1983 (27th) | —N/a | Mustafa Qureshi ‡ | N/A | Rustam Te Khan (1983) | |
| 1984 (28th) | —N/a | Nadeem ‡ | N/A | Lazawal (1984) | |
| 1984 (28th) | —N/a | Ayaz ‡ | N/A | Ishq Nachaway Gali Gali (1984) | |
| 1985 (29th) | —N/a | Nadeem ‡ | N/A | Naraaz (1985) | |
| 1985 (29th) | —N/a | Ghulam Mohiuddin ‡ | N/A | Wadera (1985) | |
| 1986 (30th) | —N/a | Nadeem ‡ | N/A | Faisla (1986) | |
| 1986 (30th) | —N/a | Afzal Ahmad ‡ | N/A | Ye Adam (1986) | |
| 1987 (31st) | —N/a | Nadeem ‡ | N/A | Choron Ki Barat (1987) | |
| 1987 (31st) | —N/a | Sultan Rahi ‡ | N/A | Dulari (1987) | |
| 1988 (32nd) | | Jawed Sheikh ‡ | N/A | Gharibon Ka Baadshah (1988) | |
| 1988 (32nd) | —N/a | Nadeem ‡ | N/A | Mukhra | |
| 1989 (33rd) | —N/a | Nadeem ‡ | N/A | Barood Ki Chahoon (1989) | |
| 1989 (33rd) | —N/a | Sultan Rahi ‡ | N/A | Kalka | |
| 1989 (33rd) | —N/a | Jawed Sheikh ‡ | N/A | Baarish (1989) | |

=== 1990s ===
| Year | Photos of winners | Actor | Role(s) | Film | Ref(s) |
|---|---|---|---|---|---|
| 1990 (34th) | | Jawed Sheikh ‡ | N/A | Ustadon Ke Ustad (1990) | |
| 1990 (34th) | —N/a | Nadeem ‡ | N/A | Gorian Dian Jhangra (1990) | |
| 1991 (35th) | —N/a | Nadeem ‡ | N/A | Watan Kay Rakhwalay | |
| 1991 (35th) | | Javed Sheikh ‡ | N/A | Kalay Chor | |
| 1992 (36th) | | Umer Shareef ‡ | N/A | Mr. 420 (1992) | |
| 1992 (36th) | —N/a | Sultan Rahi ‡ | N/A | Majhoo (1992) | |
| 1993 (37th) | | Umer Shareef ‡ | N/A | Mr. Charlie (1993) | |
| 1993 (37th) | | Jawed Sheikh ‡ | N/A | Zamana | |
| 1994 (38th) | —N/a | Ghulam Mohiuddin ‡ | N/A | Sarkata Insaan | |
| 1994 (38th) | —N/a | Yousuf Khan ‡ | N/A | But Shikan (1994) | |
| 1995 (39th) | | Jawed Sheikh ‡ | N/A | Mushkil | |
| 1995 (39th) | —N/a | Sultan Rahi ‡ | N/A | Gubbar Singh (1995) | |
| 1996 (40th) | —N/a | Saud ‡ | N/A | Hawaen (1996) | |
| 1996 (40th) | —N/a | Izhar Qazi ‡ | N/A | Sakahi Badshah (1996) | |
| 1997 (41st) | | Shaan Shahid ‡ | N/A | Sangam (1997) | |
| 1997 (41st) | —N/a | Izhar Qazi ‡ | N/A | Kala Raj (1997) | |
| 1998 (42nd) | | Shaan Shahid ‡ | N/A | Nikah | |
| 1998 (42nd) | —N/a | Moammar Rana ‡ | N/A | Choorian | |
| 1999 (43rd) | | Shaan Shahid ‡ | N/A | Jannat Ki Talash | |
| 1999 (43rd) | —N/a | Moammar Rana ‡ | N/A | Nikki Jaee Haan (1999) | |

=== 2000s ===
| Year | Photos of winners | Actor | Role(s) | Film | Ref(s) |
|---|---|---|---|---|---|
| 2000 (45th) | | Shaan Shahid ‡ | Ali | Tere Pyar Mein | |
| 2000 (45th) | —N/a | Moammar Rana ‡ | N/A | Mehndi Waley Hath (2000) | |
| 2001 (46th) | —N/a | Ajab Gul ‡ | Aswad | Khoey Ho Tum Kahan | |
| 2002 (46th) | —N/a | Moammar Rana ‡ | Falak | Yeh Dil Aap Ka Huwa | |
Not announced from 2003 to 2016
| 2017 (47th) | | Fahad Mustafa ‡ | Ahmad Jamal/Mir Taqi Mir | Mah e Mir | |
