= Muqaddar Ka Sikandar (1984 film) =

Pakistani film

- مقدر کا سکندر
- Directed by: Iqbal Kashmiri
- Written by: Sheikh Iqbal & Arsh Lakhnavi
- Produced by: Saleem Ashrafi
- Starring: Muhammad Ali; Mumtaz; Bindiya; Sultan Rahi
- Music by: Wajid Nashad
- Distributed by: Shadman Productions
- Release date: 23 March 1984
- Running time: 230 minutes
- Country: Pakistan
- Language: Urdu

Muqaddar Ka Sikandar (Urdu: مقدر کا سکندر, lit. 'Alexander of Destiny') is a 1984 Pakistani film, directed by Iqbal Kashmiri, written by Sheikh Iqbal and Arsh Lakhnavi and produced by Saleem Ashrafi. It stars Muhammad Ali, Mumtaz, Bindiya and Sultan Rahi in leading roles.

== Plot ==
The story is about Sikandar (Muhammad) who is very good at horse riding and later he wins some matches and gets rich. Then he meets (Mumtaz) Noreen who begins to like him but later Sweetie (Bindiya) also begins to like him who is the daughter of his wealthy friend. Later Sikandar is caught in a case of fraud and tries to clear his name meanwhile Raja (Sultan) also have some personal problems with Sikandar and has a score to settled.

== Cast ==
- Muhammad Ali as Sikandar
- Mumtaz as Noreen
- Bindiya as Sweetie
- Sultan Rahi as Raja
- Afshan Qureshi as Lily
- Tamanna as Madame
- Irfan Khoosat as Mr. Sadaqat
- Seema as Seema
- Khalid Saleem Mota as Ghulam
- Saqi as Seth
- Firdous Jamal as Lawyer
- Ali Ejaz as Sikandar friend
- Munawar Saeed as Client

== Music ==
All lyrics are written by Taslim Fazli & Saeed Gilani; all music is composed by Wajid Nashad.

Muqaddar Ka Sikandar
No.	Title	Singer (s)	Length
1.	"Bura Hai Rog Ishqe"	Mehnaz Begum	4:56
2.	"Aankhon Se Dil Mein"	Naheed Akhtar & Shamsa Kanwal	4:29
3.	"Main Kali Gulab Ki"	Naheed Akhtar	4:40
4.	"Ho Dil Dilbar Pyari"	Mehnaz Begum & Shazia	6:00
5.	"Duniya Ko Jalne De"	Mehnaz Begum	5:18

== Reception ==
The film was released on 23 March 1984, and it was a Silver Jubilee hit at the box office.
