= 2nd Lux Style Awards =

2003 Pakistani awards ceremony

- Date: 22 February 2003– 24 February 2003
- Site: Expo Centre, Karachi
- Hosted by: Moin Akhter

Highlights
- Best Picture: Yeh Dil Aap Ka Huwa

Television coverage
- Channel: ARY Digital

The 2003 Lux Style Awards, officially known as the 2nd Lux Style Awards ceremony, presented by the Lux Style Awards honours the best films of 2002 and took place 22–24 February 2003. This year, the city of Pakistan played host to the Pakistani Film Industry.

The official ceremony took place on 24 February 2003, at the Expo Centre, in Karachi. During the ceremony, Lux Style Awards were awarded in 27 competitive categories. The ceremony was televised in Pakistan and internationally on ARY Digital. Actor Reema Khan hosted the ceremony.

== Background ==
The Lux Style Awards is an award ceremony held annually in Pakistan since 2002. The awards celebrate "style" in the Pakistani entertainment industry, and honour the country's best talents in film, television, music, and fashion. Around 30 awards are given annually.

== Winners and nominees ==
Winners are listed first and highlighted in boldface.

2003 nominees and winners
Category	Nominees	Winner
Film
Best Film	Buddha Gujjar; Dil Dewana Hai	Yeh Dil Aap Ka Huwa
Best Film Actor	Moammar Rana-Kon Banega Crorepati; Saleem Sheikh-Yeh Dil Aap Ka Huwa; Shaan Shahid-Dakoo; Yousuf Khan-Buddha Gujjar	Moammar Rana-Yeh Dil Aap Ka Huwa
Best Film Actress	Meera-Raqqasa; Reema Khan-Fire; Saima Noor-Dakoo; Zara Sheikh-Chalo Ishq Larain	Sana Fakhar-Yeh Dil Aap Ka Huwa
Television
Best Television Play	Landa Bazar-PTV; Sarmaya-Indus Vision; Singhaar-PTV; Thori Khusi Thora Ghum-PTV	Chaandni Raatain-PTV
Best Television Actor	Akbar Subhani-Rabia Zinda Rahegi (ARY Digital); Faisal Rehman-Sarmaya (Indus Vision); Faysal Quraishi-Deewar (PTV)	Humayun Saeed-Chaandni Raatain (PTV)
Best Television Actress	Amna Haq-Singhar (PTV); Faryal Gohar-Chaandni Raatain (PTV); Nadia Jamil-Faisla (??)	Sania Saeed-Shayad Kay Phir Bahar Aaye (PTV)
Music
Best Music Act	Fuzön; Jawad Ahmed; Riaz Ali Qadri; Sajjad Ali	Abrar-ul-Haq
Best Video Director	N/A	Jami
Miscellaneous and General Awards
Most Stylish Sportsperson	Aisam-ul-Haq; Shahid Afridi; Shoaib Akhtar; Waqar Younis	Wasim Akram
Best Achievement in Fine Art	N/A	Imran Qureshi

== Special awards ==
=== LUX Icon of Beauty Award ===
Babra Sharif

=== LUX Woman of Substance Award ===
Asma Jehangir

=== Chairman's Lifetime Achievement Award ===
Nadeem Baig

=== Most Promising Emerging Talent ===
Fuzön
