= Son of Pakistan =

- Directed by: Jarar Rizvi
- Written by: Muhammad Tariq
- Produced by: Chaudhry Hameed
- Starring: Meera; Shamil Khan; Ghulam Mohiuddin; Sana Nawaz; Amna Zaheer
- Music by: Naveed Wajid Ali Naushad.
- Production company: New Vision Productions
- Distributed by: Geo Films
- Release date: 16 December 2011
- Country: Pakistan
- Language: Urdu

Son of Pakistan (Urdu: سن آف ٻاكستان, English: Son of Pakistan) is a 2011 Lollywood Urdu film written and directed by Jarrar Rizvi and released in summer 2011. It stars Sana Nawaz, Meera, Shamil Khan and Ghulam Mohiuddin, Baber Ali and Shafqat Cheema in the lead roles & Amna Zaheer (Daughter of Syed Zaheer Rizvi) as a Child Star daughter of Meera in the film.

== Premise ==
Set in Pakistan, against the backdrop of the war on terror and the prevalent consequences of the war stigmatizing Pakistan as a country that breeds and indoctrinates terrorism. The filmmakers intended Son of Pakistan to enlighten the masses and the world at large about Pakistan and its people against the backdrop of the war on terror's consequences. The filmmakers intended to counter a negative prejudice about Pakistan and its people as terrorists — and to show their perspective that the people of Pakistan follow a peaceful way of life.

The movie tells the story of a dutiful police officer S.P. Islam who comes from a patriotic upbringing as does his brother. Son of Pakistan depicts uncertainty in the concept of patriotism while taking the protagonist's perspective of compassion towards his fellow citizens when he cannot be certain that everyone shares his beliefs. In a place of uncertainty being an enforcer of law where he comes across a potential terrorist every day, he can't trust anyone and has only himself to trust.

== Cast ==
- Ghulam Mohiuddin
- Babar Ali as Aliis Abu Zahid
- Shamil Khan
- Meera
- Amna Zaheer
- Sana Nawaz
- Sila Hussain
- Amit Bhola Hansda
- Shafqat Cheema

== Release ==
The film was released on 16 December 2011.

=== Reception ===
Son of Pakistan mostly faced negative reviews. A critical review published in the Express Tribune stated "Son of Pakistan disappoints." There are some sources who praises the film, especially the director and producer for their courageous effort.

== Soundtrack ==
No.	Title	Performer(s)	Length
1.	"Son of Pakistan Title Song"	Ameer Ali	3:18
2.	"Bhangra Punjabi Bha Zara"	Saima Jahan, Ameer Ali, Amna Zaheer, Nadeem Abbas, Amir Ghulam Abbas	4:35
3.	"Kaali Kaali Tere Ankhein"	Ahmed Jahanzeb	5:20
4.	"Hum Tum Sa Mila"	Ameer Ali, Saima Jahan	3:01
5.	"Bibi Sheerini"	Saima Jahan	1:42
6.	"Toona Toona"	Maria Shaukat	2:47
7.	"Yeh Mausam"	Saima Jahan, Nadeem Abbas	2:53
