= Jarrar Rizvi =

Pakistani film director

- Born: Jarrar Rizvi; Karachi, Sindh, Pakistan
- Occupation: Film director
- Years active: 1964 – present

Jarrar Rizvi is a Pakistani film director who directed Agent 009, Jeetay Hain Shaan Sey and Son of Pakistan. His films are usually patriotically themed. He is known as a 'star-maker' in Pakistani showbiz, introducing certain stars such as Veena Malik and Meera.

He has been in advertising for 32 years.

== Early life ==
During the 60s, Rizvi worked with his father, Baqar Rizvi, who was a director in Karachi Studio working with the likes of Sahiba and Santosh.

He continued to work in advertising in Karachi also.

== Directing career ==
During the 1980s Rizvi started his directing career; his debut movie was Agent 009, an Urdu film. It starred Mussarat Shaheen, Qavi, Aslam Pervez, Naghma and Nasir Chan. He directed Jeetay Hain Shaan Sey in 1996, starring Sahiba Afzal, Asad Bukhari, Nain Tara, Sonia and Abid Kashmiri. It did not succeed in the box office, leaving Rizvi a long gap in his directing career.

In 2011 he released his film Son of Pakistan, on a budget of 40 million Pakistani rupees. It starred Shamil Khan, Sana Nawaz, Meera and Babar Ali.

Rizvi is working on a mega-budget film, Aman ki Asha, based on the idea of promoting peace in South Asia. “My subjects are always message-based and patriotically inclined. That’s why I never compromise on quantity over quality,” Jarar says while chalking out his plan. He changed the name to Deal. Other movies Rizvi has announced are Janbaaz, Insaaf Tay Hun Huway Ga, Dracula in Pakistan and Thor Punjaban.

== Filmography ==
=== Director ===
Year	Film	Language
1982	Agent 009	Urdu
1996	Jeetay Hain Shaan Sey	Urdu
2011	Son of Pakistan	Urdu
2012	Janbaaz	Urdu
Eid ul Fitr 2016	Jab Tak Hain Hum	Urdu
TBA	Aik Dil Hi To Hai	Urdu
TBA	Tumne Chaha Hi Nahin	Urdu

=== Assistant director ===
Year	Film	Language
1977	Door Ki Aawaz	Urdu
1979	Black Cat	Urdu
1882	Nishana	Urdu
1987	Patta Khazana	Pushto
1988	Lady Boss	Urdu
1989	Inteqam Hum Lein Ge	Urdu
