= Saira Naseem =

Pakistani singer

- سائرہ نسیم
- Born: 8 December 1970 (age 55); Lahore, Punjab
- Occupation: Singer
- Years active: 1987 – present
- Spouse(s): Nadeem Abbas Lonay Wala (m. 2012; div. 2020) Asad Abbas (m. 1994; died 2000)
- Awards: Sitara-i-Imtiaz (Star of Excellence) award by the President of Pakistan in 2026; Won 4 Nigar Awards for her playback singing in films Superstar Award by Radio Pakistan in 2022

Sahira Naseem is a Pakistani singer who also is a playback singer in the Lollywood films from the era of 1990s to the present. She has received 4 Best Playback Singer Nigar Awards.

In 2011, she performed in a 'mega concert' arranged by Pakistan National Council of the Arts along with folk singers Attaullah Khan Esakhelvi and Malkoo in Islamabad, Pakistan.

== Career ==
Naseem started her singing career in the film Hum Se Hai Zamana, which was released in 1987. She sang a chorus song for the film along with A. Nayyar, Munir Hussain, and Masood Rana. From then on, her career as a playback vocalist kept moving forward and she sang 55 songs in 81 Urdu and Punjabi movies. Apart from film songs, she also sings poems, ghazals, and naats.

== List of Popular films songs ==
- 1994 (Film: International Luteray - Urdu) ... Main Jungle Ki Bulbul, Mujhay Pinjray Mein Rakhwa, Music: Wajahat Attre, Poet: Khawaja Pervez
- 1994 (Film: International Luteray - Urdu) ... Meri Kamar Peerh Shuru Ho Geyi, Kuchh Kar Jania, Music: Wajahat Attray, Poet: Khawaja Parvez
- 1994 (Film: Laat Sahib - Punjabi) ... Teinu Meray Leyi Rabb Nay Banaya, Music: M. Ashraf, Poet: Khawaja Parvez
- 1996 (Film: Chor Machaye Shor (1996 film) - Urdu) ... Ghari Raat Ka Eik Bajaye Aur Janu Ghar Na Aye, Music: M. Arshad, Poet: ?
- 1996 (Film: Ghunghat - Urdu) ... Mein Larki Hoon Phool Tau Nahin Ke Koi Mujhe Taur Le Ga, Music: Amjad Bobby, Poet: Riaz ur Rehman Saghar
- 1997 (Film: Sangam - Urdu) ... Aa Pyar Dil Mein Jagaa, Music: Amjad Bobby, Poet: Riaz ur Rehman Saghar
- 1998 (Film: Choorian- Punjabi) ... Neray Neray Aa Zalma Way, Main Thak Geyi Aan, Music: Zulfiqar Ali, Poet: Ahmed Aqeel Ruby
- 1998 (Film: Choorian - Punjabi) ... Torr Suttan Choorian Tay Khol Suttan Waal, Music: Zulfiqar Ali, Poet: Ahmed Aqeel Ruby
- 1998 (Film: Choorian - Punjabi) ... Udd Kothay Uttun Kanwan Way, Music: Zulfiqar Ali, Poet: Rukhsana Noor
- 1998 (Film: Nikah - Urdu) ... Jara Hai Jara Hai Sayyan Ang Laga Le, Music: M. Arshad, Poet: Saeed Gillani
- 2000 (Film: Billi - Urdu) ... Apne Daman Main Jaga Do, Music: M. Arshad, Poet: ?
- 2000 (Film: Jungle Queen - Urdu) ... Taroon Bhari Raat, Music: M. Arshad, Poet: ?
- 2003 (Film: Larki Punjaban - Urdu) ... Mere Sajan, Music: Zain, Poet: ?

== Awards and recognition ==
Year	Award	Category	Result	Notes	Ref.
1995	Nigar Award	Best playback female singer	Won	Jungle Ka Qanoon (film)	
1996	Nigar Award	Best playback female singer (along with Shazia Manzoor)	Won	Chor Machaaey Shor (film)	
1998	Nigar Award	Best playback female singer	Won	Choorian (film)	
2000	Nigar Award	Best playback female singer	Won	Mehndi Waley Hath (film)	
2022	Superstar Award	Singer	Won	Radio Pakistan	
2026	Sitara-i-Imtiaz (Star of Excellence) award	Singer	Won	awarded by the President of Pakistan	
