= Malkoo =

Pakistani Singer and Composer

- Born: Muhammad Ashraf Malik; 27 May 1974 (age 51)
- Origin: Sargodha, Punjab, Pakistan
- Genres: Bhangra; Pop; Folk
- Occupations: Singer-songwriter musician
- Years active: 2004 - present
- Label: Malkoo Studio TPGold

Malkoo (Punjabi, Urdu: ملکو) born as Muhammad Ashraf Malik (Punjabi, Urdu: محمد اشرف ملک) on 27 May 1974 in Sargodha is a Pakistani pop, Punjabi bhangra and folk singer and composer.

Malkoo has sung songs in Punjabi language, Pashto language and Saraiki languages and the songs are in folk, pop music and bhangra genre.

In 2011, he performed in a 'mega concert' arranged by Pakistan National Council of the Arts along with folk singer Attaullah Khan Esakhelvi and Saira Naseem in Islamabad, Pakistan.

== Discography ==
Malkoo released his first album Sochna Vi Na in 2004 which was very popular in Pakistan and among overseas Pakistanis.

- "Sochna Vi Na" (2004)
- Bismillah Karan (2011)
- Kala Jora Paa Sahdi Farmaish Tey (2007)
- Wey Changa Sahda Yaar Ae Toon
- Aaja Sohniye Tenu Nachnaan Sikha Diyan (2007)
- Chhaddo Sahnun Guddian Uddaan Deo
- Bhatti Dollar Kaman Challeya (2007)
- Nachdi Kamaal
- Malkoo Studio Season 1 (2018)
- Malkoo Studio Season 2 (Wedding Session) (2021)
- Nak da Koka Qaidi 804 Part 1 (2023)
- Nak da Koka Qaidi 804 Part 2 (2023)
