= Sargam (1995 film) =

1995 film

Sargam سرگم
- Directed by: Syed Noor
- Written by: Syed Noor
- Produced by: Syed Noor
- Starring: Adnan Sami Khan; Zeba Bakhtiar; Nadeem; Shafqat Cheema
- Music by: Adnan Sami Khan
- Release date: 1 September 1995
- Country: Pakistan
- Language: Urdu

Sargam (transl. Melody) is a Pakistani musical Urdu film directed by Syed Noor starring the singer Adnan Sami Khan and Zeba Bakhtiar. In an interview, Adnan Sami would say that Sanjay Leela Bhansali's Hum Dil De Chuke Sanam (1999) was a "copy" of Sargam.

The film marked Sami Khan's first and only appearance in any Pakistani film. Additionally, classical musician Maharaj Ghulam Hussain Kathak made a rare acting appearance in this film.

The song 'Woh Mujhey Yaad Aaya' was sung by the Pakistani pop artist Hadiqa Kiyani.

This film won eight Nigar Awards in 1995.

== Cast ==
- Zeba Bakhtiar
- Adnan Sami Khan
- Mustafa Qureshi
- Nadeem
- Deeba

== Soundtrack ==
Most of the film songs were written by Riaz ur Rehman Saghar, and the music was composed by Adnan Sami Khan.

- "Aae Khuda, aae Khuda, jis nay ki justuju"... (Singer: Adnan Sami Khan), lyrics by the poet Muzaffar Warsi
- "Suhani rutt ayi, mann jhoomay"... (Singer: Hamid Ali Khan, Adnan Sami Khan and Hadiqa Kiyani)
- "Pall do pall kay hayn andheray"... (Singer: Adnan Sami Khan)
- "Bheega hua mousam pyara"... (Singer: Adnan Sami Khan)
- "Chamki kiran, khilay purwa"... (Singer: Hamid Ali Khan and Adnan Sami Khan)
- "Kab sey khili ho, mujhe abb mili ho" (Classic music vs Pop music)... (Singer: Maharaj Ghulam Hussain Kathak, Adnan Sami Khan and Hadiqa Kiyani)
- "Kya hay, yeh uljhan kya hay...?" (Singer: Adnan Sami Khan and Asha Bhosle)
- "Zara Dholki bajao gorio"... (Singer: Adnan Sami Khan and Asha Bhosle)
- "Pyar bina jeena nahin jeena"... (Singer: Adnan Sami Khan and Hadiqa Kiyani)
- "Barse Badal, dil mein halchal"... (Singer: Adnan Sami Khan and Hadiqa Kiyani)
- "Woh mujhay yaad aaya"... (Singer: Hadiqa Kiyani)

== Awards ==
Year	Award	Category	Recipient(s)	Result
1995	Nigar Awards	Best Film	Syed Noor	Won
1995	Nigar Awards	Best Director	Syed Noor	Won
1995	Nigar Awards	Best Script Writer	Syed Noor	Won
1995	Nigar Awards	Best Actress	Zeba Bakhtiar	Won
1995	Nigar Awards	Best Supporting Actor	Maharaj Ghulam Hussain Kathak	Won
1995	Nigar Awards	Best Music Director	Adnan Sami Khan	Won
1995	Nigar Awards	Best Lyricist	Riaz ur Rehman Saghar	Won
1995	Nigar Awards	Best Playback Female Singer	Hadiqa Kiyani	Won
