= Arjumand Shaheen =

Pakistani newscaster

- Born: Arjumand Shaheen Zaidi; Lahore, Pakistan
- Education: University of Lahore (MA)
- Occupations: Newscaster; Writer; Sports commentator
- Years active: 1972 – present
- Spouse: Mazahir Zaidi (husband)
- Children: 2
- Relatives: Shehryar Zaidi (brother); Nayyara Noor (sister-in-law); Jaffer Zaidi (nephew)

Arjumand Shaheen is a Pakistani newscaster at Radio Pakistan and PTV and a short story writer.

== Early life ==
Shaheen's parents were from Muzaffarnagar in Uttar Pradesh during British India, but after the partition of India her family migrated to Pakistan and settled in Lahore, where Arjumand was born on 28 November 1952. She is the sister of actors Shehryar Zaidi, Shahnawaz Zaidi and newscaster Yasmeen Wasti.

She received a Master of Arts from the University of Lahore.

== Career ==
Shaheen started working at Radio Pakistan in 1972, where she worked for two years as a news reader for local news, and later worked as a sports commentator. She was later contacted by a director from PTV Centre, and eventually was selected for the 9:00 pm PTV Khabarnama. She used to announce news about important events, such as about Kashmir and business-related news. Later she also wrote a short story book which was published in 1978. In the 1980s, she also worked in Milaads.

In 1982, she was awarded Nigar Award for Best Newscaster.

In 1999, she was honored by the Government of Pakistan with the Tamgha-e-Imtiaz for her contributions to the media and radio industry.

Later, she moved with her family to London and worked as a short story writer. She wrote a book Mausam Ki Baarish ("seasonal rain") followed by another short story Be Mausam Ki Barish ("unseasonal rain").

== Personal life ==
Shaheen married Mazahir Zaidi and has two daughters. Her aunt Azra Asghar is a novel writer.

== Filmography ==
=== News presentations ===
Year	Title	Role	Network
1972	Urdu Khabrein	Newscaster	Radio Pakistan
1974	PTV Khabarnama	Newscaster	PTV

== Awards and recognition ==
Year	Award	Category	Result	Presented by	Ref.
1982	Nigar Award	Best Newscaster	Won	Nigar Awards Committee	
1999	Tamgha-e-Imtiaz	Arts	Won	President of Pakistan	
