= Shaista Zaid =

Pakistani newscaster

- شائستہ زید
- Born: Shaista Khan; Rawalpindi, Punjab, Pakistan
- Occupations: Radio Presenter; Newscaster
- Years active: 1969 – 2012
- Children: 2
- Awards: Pride of Performance (1988)

Shaista Zaid is a former Pakistani English newscaster and radio presenter who worked for Pakistan Television and Radio Pakistan for almost four decades. In 1988, she received presidential Pride of Performance Awards. She has also received a Nigar Award for Best Newscaster.

== Early life ==
Shaista Zaid belongs to Rawalpindi, Punjab and joined PTV in 1969, five years after the launch of the first state-owned news channel.

== Career ==
She worked anchored evening English news on PTV until 2012. She retired after 43 years on July, 20th 2012 as the most senior newscaster of Pakistan Television News.

== Awards and recognition ==
- Pride of Performance Award in 1988 by the President of Pakistan.
- Nigar Award
- At 9th PTV Awards she received best newscaster award in 1998
