= Saleem Sheikh =

Pakistani actor

- سلیم شیخ
- Born: 9 March 1967 (age 59); Rawalpindi, Punjab, Pakistan
- Occupations: Actor; Producer
- Years active: 1975–present
- Spouse: Nosheen Saleem (1999–present)
- Relatives: Jawed Sheikh (brother); Behroze Sabzwari (brother-in-law); Shahzad Sheikh (nephew); Momal Sheikh (niece); Shehroz Sabzwari (nephew)

Saleem Sheikh (Punjabi, Urdu: سلیم شیخ) (also spelled Saleem Shaikh) is a Pakistani actor and producer.

== Career ==
=== 1970s: Child actor ===
He made his on-screen debut in PTV's drama series Shama where he portrayed the younger version of his brother Jawed Sheikh's character. He later appeared as a child artist in PTV's children's plays.

=== 1990s: Mainstream success ===
He is best known for portraying GC Safeer in Shoaib Mansoor's military drama Sunehray Din. Sheikh made his film debut in 1992 with Mohabbat Ke Saudagar.

=== 2010s-present: Resurgence and character roles ===
His career saw a resurgence in 2010 when he played Abdul Hameed "Midu" in Anokha Ladla and in its sequels in the following years.

== Selected filmography ==
Key
†	denotes film / drama that has not released yet
†	Denotes films / drama that are currently on cinema / on air

=== Television serials ===
Year	Title	Role	Producer	Network	Notes
1976	Shama	Mansoor		PTV	Child actor
1986	Dastak	Salman		PTV	
1990	Parosi	Arsal		PTV	
1991	Sunehray Din	Safeer		PTV	
1993	Zakham	Anees		PTV	
1994	Khoobsurat Jahan	Nasir		PTV	
1995	Dastak Aur Darwaza	Mehboob		PTV	
1995	Dukh Sukh	Sarmad		PTV	
1998	Kallo	Sajid		PTV	
1998	Rahain	Khalid		PTV	
1998	Paranda	Yasir		PTV	
1998	Cast Walk	Farhan		PTV	
1999	Chandpur Ka Chandoo	Ahsan		PTV	
1999	Ghareeb-e-Shehar	Saleem Ullah		PTV	
2000	Qafas	Sheharyar		PTV	
2000	Jeevan	Zafar		PTV	
2000	Kaanch Kay Par	Rohail		PTV	
2000	Dopatta	Kashif		PTV	
2001	Kajal Ghar	Shaukat		PTV	
2001	Armaan	Aadil		PTV	
2001	Sarmaya	Jahangir		PTV	
2002	Dunya Dari	Rahat		PTV	
2003	Pankh	Taimur		PTV	
2003	Karwat	Jamal		PTV	
2004	Khamosh	SHO Sikandar		PTV	
2004	Neela Aasman	Kamal		PTV	
2004	Sirf Tumhare Liye			PTV	
2005	Dil Se Dil Tak	Danish		PTV	
2005	Sath Nibhana Hai	Shah Mir		PTV	
2005	Kaanch Ki Guria	Fahad		PTV	
2006	Makan	Jaffer		Geo Entertainment	
2007	Ye Rah Mushkil Nahi			PTV Home	
2007	Dil Mera Mera Nahi			PTV Home	
2007	Pyar Main			PTV Home	
2007	Paglay Yahin Ke			PTV Home	
2007	Ghar	Talib		PTV Home	
2008	Khawahishon Kay Jugnoo			PTV Home	
2008	Shehar-e-Murad			PTV Home	
2010	Dil Behkay Ga	Ameer		PTV Home	
2011	Anokha Ladla (Season 1)	Abdul Hameed "Midu"	Yes	PTV Home	
2012	Bilqees Kaur	Farooq		Hum TV	
2012	Anokha Ladla (Season 2)	Abdul Hameed "Midu"	Yes	PTV Home	
2013	Anokha Ladla (Season 3)	Abdul Hameed "Midu"	Yes	PTV Home	
2014	Apni Kahani Kese Kahain		Yes	Express Entertainment	
2015	Maan	Nadeem		Hum TV	
2015	Tere Baghair	Nisar		Hum TV	
2016	Babul Ka Angna			Geo Entertainment	
2016	Nautanki Family			PTV Home	
2016	Pashemaan		Yes	Express Entertainment	
2016	Laaj	Dilawar		Hum TV	
2017	Adhi Gawahi	Faizan		Hum TV	
2017	Dar Si Jaati Hai Sila	Sikander		Hum TV	
2017	Rani	Nadir Shah		Geo Entertainment	
2017	No Time For Pyar Vyar	Ashar		PTV Home	
2018	Jugnu	Jugnu	Yes	PTV Home	
2018	Aapko Kya Takleef Hai	Nasir		Bol	
2018	Hoor Pari	Najeeb		A-Plus TV	
2020	Baarish Main Aag	Sardar Shahzad		LTN Family	
2022	Wabaal	Shakir		Hum TV	
2023	Fairy Tale	Pasha Sahib		Hum TV	
2023	Fairy Tale 2	Pasha Sahib		Hum TV	
2026	Dekh Zara Pyar Se	Abu Qaiser		Hum TV	

=== Films ===
- Mohabat Ke Saudagar (1992)
- Duniya Dus Numberi (1993)
- Qasam (1993)
- Chief Sahib (1996)
- Sangam (1997)
- Yes Boss (1997)
- Kaheen Pyar Na Hojaye (1998)
- Dil Sanbhala Na Jaye (1998)
- Aik Aur Love Story (1999)
- Yeh Dil Aap Ka Huwa (2002)
- Khulay Aasman Ke Neechay (2008)
- Bullah (2026) as Bakhshi, the movie's main antagonist

== Awards ==
- Bolan award for Best actor in Chief Sahb 1996
- Nigar award for Best supporting actor in Yeh Dil Aap Ka Huwa 2002
- Ptv Award for best supporting actor in (Dil Behkay Ga) 2012

Ceremony	Category	Project	Result
2nd Lux Style Awards	Best Film Actor	Yeh Dil Aap Ka Huwa	Nominated
10th Lux Style Awards	Best TV Play (Terrestrial)	Anokha Ladla	Won
10th Lux Style Awards	Best TV Actor (Terrestrial)	Anokha Ladla	Nominated
12th Lux Style Awards	Best TV Actor (Terrestrial)	Anokha Ladla	Nominated

== See also ==
- List of Lollywood actors
