= Nasir Adeeb =

Pakistani film scriptwriter

- Born: 6 March 1947 (age 79); Sargodha, Punjab, British India (present-day Punjab, Pakistan)
- Occupation: Film scriptwriter
- Years active: 1975 – present
- Spouse: Amna Ulfat
- Children: 3 sons; 2 Daughters Zoya Nasir
- Parents: Ghulam Hussain (father); Khatija Begum (mother)
- Awards: Full list

Nasir Adeeb (born 6 March 1947) is a Pakistani scriptwriter, chiefly working in Punjabi language films of Lollywood.

He holds unasserted world record for writing the highest number of film scripts until date. (Note: around 2019 to 2020) He has also written many novels, including a spy novel which was published during his school days. He earned recognition in the 1970s with his first classical film Wehshi Jatt and subsequently with Maula Jatt, a mass market blockbuster film with its characters like Noori Natt. The film became a subject between the government of Pakistan and the filmmakers for its story written by Nasir Adeeb.

The recipient of numerous awards and accordion, including Presidential Pride of Performance, he wrote scripts and dialogues for more than four hundred films and is also credited for introducing "gandasa" genre in films which according to The Diplomat brought significant improvements to the Pakistan film industry during its unsuccessful productions.

== Life and background ==
He was born to Khadija Begum and Ghulam Hussain in Sargodha on 6 March 1947. He has seven siblings, including five brothers and 2 sisters. In 1961, he moved to Lahore where he began his film career.

== Career ==
He started his career in 1971 at Pakistan Television Corporation as an assistant program producer. At that time, his novel titled Aswa was seen in a local newspaper ad for a film claimed to ran without his consent. The incident was referred to judiciary where a civil Judge named Sheikh Abdur Rashid investigated the incident, leading him to become a part of the film and was eventually introduced to the Lollywood. He also wrote a play titled Janam Janam Ki Maili Chadar that premiered on the country's broadcaster and ran for one thousand shows, one of the longest TV shows of Pakistan. His film songs are chiefly sung by Noor Jehan, Pakistani playback singer also referred to as "the queen of melody". As a screenwriter, he wrote The Legend of Maula Jatt film. In 2024, he made controversial remarks about Reema which earned outrage from celebrates later Adeeb apologized.

== Filmography ==
Title	Year	Type/Credited as	Ref.
Wehshi Jatt	1975	Screenwriter	
Maula Jatt	1979	Screenwriter	
Chan Varyam	1981	Screenwriter	
Sher Khan	1981	Screenwriter	
Yeh Adam	1986	Screenwriter	
International Luteray	1994	Writer	
International Guerillas	1999	Screenwriter	
The Legend of Maula Jatt	2022	Screenwriter	
Bullah	2026	Screenwriter	

== Awards ==
Year	Nominated work and artist	Award	Category	Result	Ref.
2019	Maula Jatt	Pride of Performance by the President of Pakistan	Best scriptwriter	Won	
1986	Yeh Adam	Nigar award	Best scriptwriter	Won	
1981	Chan Varyam	Nigar award	Best scriptwriter	Won	
1976	Toofan	Nigar award	Best scriptwriter	Won	
—N/a	Nasir Adeeb	Asian Cultural Award	Best scriptwriter	Won	
—N/a	Nasir Adeeb	Bolan Award	Best scriptwriter	Won	
—N/a	Nasir Adeeb	Graduate Award	Best scriptwriter	Won	
