= Ismail Tara =

Pakistani actor and comedian (1949–2022)

- اسماعیل تارا
- Born: Muhammad Ismail Merchant; 16 November 1949; Karachi, Pakistan
- Died: 24 November 2022 (aged 73); Karachi, Pakistan
- Occupations: Actor; Comedian
- Years active: 1964 – 2022
- Known for: Fifty Fifty (TV comedy show)
- Awards: Pride of Performance award by the President of Pakistan in 2022 * 5 Nigar Awards during his career

Ismail Tara (Urdu: اسماعیل تارا; 16 November 1949 – 24 November 2022), born Muhammad Ismail Merchant, was a Pakistani actor and comedian.

He worked in stage plays, television serials and Lollywood films from 1964 until his death in 2022.

He was best known for his work in Fifty Fifty, which aired on Pakistani television's PTV in the 1980s.

He was a five-time Nigar Awards winner for the best comedian in the films Haathi Mere Saathi (1993), Aakhri Mujra (1994), Munda Bigra Jaye (1995), Chief Sahib (1996) and Deewarein (1998).

== Early life ==
Tara was born on 16 November 1949 Muhammad Ismail Merchant in Karachi into a Gujarati-speaking Memon business family, and began his career in 1964, at the age of 15, when he got a role in a play staged by a small theatre.

== Career ==
Tara first rose to prominence when he became a part of the Zia Mohyeddin Show in 1972–1973.

Tara is best known for the popular TV show Fifty Fifty, ending up writing some of its scripts along with fellow TV comedian Majid Jahangir when the original scriptwriter Anwar Maqsood had a fall-out with the show's cast in 1981.

According to a major Pakistani English-language newspaper:

"Ismail Tara, who passed away November 24, 2022, was a master of physical comedy and mimicry. It was the legendary skit show Fifty Fifty that launched him to nationwide fame and it was its presence, first on VCDs and then on YouTube, that sustained it and made him a household name with a whole new generation of viewers".

== Personal life and death ==
Tara had to perform a comedy theater the same day his 8-year-old son died. After his performance, he told the audience about his son's death.

Ismail Tara died due to kidney failure in Karachi on 24 November 2022, at the age of 73. He was buried in his hometown Karachi, Pakistan.

== Filmography ==
=== Television ===
Year	Title	Channel
1978	Fifty Fifty	PTV
1987	Ghar Rama	PTV
1992	Haveli	PTV
2005	Rubber Band	ARY Digital
2007	Mamoo	PTV
2008	Choki # 420	Aaj Entertainment
2008	Paanch Saheliyan	Geo Entertainment
2008	Yeh Zindagi Hai	Geo Entertainment
2009	Nadaaniyaan	Geo Entertainment
2012	One Way Ticket	Hum TV
2012	Pak Villa	Geo TV
2012	Dheeli Colony	Urdu 1
2013	Orangi Ki Anwari	TVOne
2013	Yeh Shadi Nahi Ho Sakti	ARY Digital
2013	Bulbulay	ARY Digital
2013	Namak Paray	Hum TV
2015	Love In Gulshan-e-Bihar	TVOne
2018	Jinn Ki Aayegi Baraat	BOL Entertainment
2018	Mirchiyaan	BOL Entertainment
2019	Barfi Laddu	ARY Digital
2019	Bhai Bhai	Express Entertainment
2020	Ulta Seedha	Apna TV
2020	Shokhiyaan	Geo Entertainment
2022	Woh Pagal Si	ARY Digital

=== Films ===
Year	Movie	Role
1993	Haathi Mere Saathi	
1994	Aakhri Mujra	
1995	Munda Bigra Jaye	
1996	Chief Sahib	
1997	Hum Kisi Se Kum Nahin	
1997	Jan Jan Pakistan	
1997	Raju	
1998	Deewarein	
1998	Kabhi Haan Kabhi Naa	
1999	Mujhe Jeene Do	
2000	Mujhe Chand Chahiye	
2002	Yeh Dil Aap Ka Huwa	
2008	Khulay Aasman Ke Neechay	
2013	Main Hoon Shahid Afridi	Malick Khalid
2015	Jawani Phir Nahi Ani	
2015	Halla Gulla	
2016	Sawal 700 Crore Dollar Ka	
2018	Jackpot	Mr.China
2018	The Donkey King	Pehalwan Chacha
2019	Ready Steady No	

=== Stage plays ===
Title	Language
Soney Ki Chirya	Punjabi
Mehndi Lagi Mere Hath	Punjabi
Tere Nakhre Hazaar	Punjabi
Pohlay Badshah	Punjabi
Wah Wah Moin Akhtar	Urdu

== Awards and nominations ==
- Nigar Awards: Winner for best comedian for Haathi Mere Saathi in 1993
- Nigar Awards: Winner for best comedian for Aakhri Mujra in 1994
- Nigar Awards: Winner for best comedian for Munda Bigra Jaye in 1995
- Nigar Awards: Winner for best comedian for Chief Sahib in 1996
- Nigar Awards: Winner for best comedian for Deewarein in 1998
- The 1st Indus Drama Awards: Nominated for Best Actor Sitcom in a Leading Role and received Award for TV Comedy Series Fifty Fifty (1980s)
- Pride of Performance award from the President of Pakistan in 2022 for his contributions to Pakistani television and films.
