= Wajid Nashad =

Pakistani music director

Wajid Ali Nashad
- Born: Wajid Ali; 1953; Bombay (now Mumbai), India
- Died: 18 June 2008 (aged 54–55); Lahore, Pakistan
- Occupations: Film and Television Music Composer
- Years active: 1977 – 2008
- Relatives: Music director Nashad (father); Music director Naveed Ali Nashad (son)
- Awards: Nigar Award in 1994

Wajid Ali Nashad (Urdu: واجِد علی ناشاد), (1953 – 18 June 2008) was a noted Pakistani music composer. He was born in Bombay, India and died in Lahore, Pakistan after having a long career as a composer. He died on 18 June 2008.

== Early life and career ==
Wajid Ali was the son of eminent musician Nashad and brother of singer Ameer Ali. In 1964, Nashad's family migrated to Pakistan from Bombay (now Mumbai). Wajid graduated from the Government College Lahore, Pakistan and went on to complete an MA degree as a private candidate.

Wajid composed music for more than 50 films. His first film was Parastish (1977) (Released on: January 14, 1977, banner: N G Films, producer: Nasim Ahmad, director: Aziz-ul-Hassan, Cast: Deeba, Nadeem, Waheed Murad, Mumtaz, Nanha, Khalid Salim Mota, Saqi, Munawar Saeed, Nayyar Sultana). It had the following songs:

- "Mujhe le chal, yahaan se door un Waadiyon mein, jahaan khushboo ho, jahaan naghme haun, jahaan pyaar mile", rendered by Mehnaz Begum
- "Subah-o-shaam, tera naam, honthon pe hai", rendered by Mehnaz Begum
- "Aankhon se tum jana nahin door", rendered by Ahmad Rushdi
- "Chhod na dena mera saath, Sathi", rendered by Mehnaz Begum
- "Saathi re, beet na jaye mausam pyar ka", rendered by Rajab Ali, Mehnaz Begum

Other films he composed for were:

- Lady Commando (1989)
- Aakhri Mujra (1994) - Wajid Ali Nashad won the Best Music Nigar Award for this film.
- Mummy (1996)
- Love '95 (1996)
- Haathi Mere Saathi (1993)
- Miss Istanbul (1996)
- Hum Kisi Se Kum Nahin (1997)
- Koi Tujh Sa Kahan (2005)
- Tarap (2006)
- Zevar

He also composed background music for many television programmes and serials including the following TV dramas:

- Dasht (Singer: Ameer Ali)
- Doosra Aasman (Singer: Ameer Ali)
- Kanch Ke Par (Singer: Ameer Ali)
- Lunda Bazar (Singer: Ameer Ali)
- Hawa Pe Raqs (Singer: Ameer Ali)
- Mehndi Walay Haath (TV Series) (2005)
- Sada Suhagan (2007)

== Death and legacy ==
Wajid Ali Nashad died on June 18, 2008, in Lahore at the age of 55. He is survived by four sons and a daughter. One of his sons, Naveed Nashad, is following his father's and grandfather's musical footsteps, working on many drama serials and films. Pakistani popular singer and his younger brother Ameer Ali told news reporters, after his death, that his brother had developed sinus problems three years ago and had undergone surgery for its treatment. The problem came back again recently and he was operated upon again. But his health started getting worse and he was taken to Shaukat Khanum Memorial Hospital, Lahore where he was diagnosed as suffering from brain tumour.

Show business personalities attending his funeral were musician Wajahat Attre, film writer Pervaiz Kaleem, film producer/director Asif Ali Pota and musician M. Arshad.
