= Jungle Ka Qanoon =

1995 Pakistani political action film directed by Masood Butt

Jangal Ka Qanoon
- Directed by: Masood Butt
- Written by: Nasir Adeeb
- Produced by: Safdar Khan, Safdar Malik
- Starring: Sultan Rahi; Nadeem; Ghulam Mohiuddin; Izhar Qazi; Saima; Reema; Nargis; Bahar; Albela; Abid Ali; Altaf Khan; Tariq Shah; Adeeb; Humayun Qureshi
- Narrated by: Haji Akram
- Cinematography: Masood Butt
- Edited by: Z.A Gulf
- Music by: M. Ashraf
- Production company: Evernew Studio
- Distributed by: Shama Purana Pictures
- Release date: 1 December 1995 (Pakistan)
- Running time: 153 minutes
- Country: Pakistan
- Languages: Urdu/Punjabi, Double version

Jungle Ka Qanoon (Urdu: جنگل کا قانون) is 1995 Pakistani double version political action film directed by Masood Butt and produced by Safdar Khan. The film stars actors Nadeem, Ghulam Mohiuddin, Sultan Rahi and Humayun Qureshi.

== Cast ==
- Sultan Rahi
- Nadeem
- Izhar Qazi
- Saima
- Reema
- Nargis
- Albela
- Abid Ali
- Bahar Begum
- Humayun Qureshi
- Tariq Shah
- Shafqat Cheema
- Adeeb
- Altaf Khan
- Zahir Shah
- Nasrrullah Butt

== Crew ==
- Writer - Nasir Adeeb
- Producer - Safdar Khan
- Production Company - Shama Parwana Pictures
- Cinematographer - Masud Butt
- Music Director - M. Ashraf
- Lyricist - Saeed Gillani, Khawaja Pervez
- Playback Singers - Noor Jehan, Saira Naseem

== Awards ==
This film won a total of 7 awards as listed below:

- Nigar Award for 'Best Film of 1995' in the Punjabi-language category.
- Nigar Award 'Best Director', Masood Butt in the Punjabi-language category
- Nigar Award 'Best Scriptwriter', Nasir Adeeb in the Punjabi-language category
- Nigar Award 'Best Actress', Reema Khan in the Punjabi-language category
- Nigar Award 'Best Supporting Actor', Humayun Qureshi in the Punjabi-language category
- Nigar Award 'Best Music Director', M. Ashraf in the Punjabi-language category
- Nigar Award 'Best song writer, Khawaja Pervez in the Punjabi-language category
