= Shamsa Kanwal =

Pakistani singer

- Occupations: radio, television, and film singer
- Known for: singing in Pakistani radio, television, and film
- Spouse: Altaf Hussain

Shamsa Kanwal is a Pakistani radio, television, and film singer. She started singing as a child in the TV program "Geet Suhanay". She has sung around 1000 geets, ghazals, and playback songs during the 1980s and 1990s. She is also a poet and her first poetry book has been published under the title "Dhoop Ki Zad Mein Pehla Chand".

She was married to film director Altaf Hussain.

== Discography ==
- Tu Aaya Aaya Hai
- Maan Bhi Jao
- Muskurane Ko Ji
- Ae Ri Gajarya
- Main Ne Tere Khawab
- Subah Ki Pehli Kiran
- Mat Jao Mat Jao
- Khuda Kare Ke Meri Arz-e-Pak
- Aesi Ratein Bhi
- Ranj Khenchey They Dagh
- Chup Ho Ja Re
- Aankhon Mein Tere Sapne
- Tujh Pe Fida Mere

== Awards ==
Year	Award	Category	Result	Film	Ref.
1993	Nigar Award	Best playback female singer	Won	Zamana	
1994	Nigar Award	Best playback female singer	Won	Rani Beti Raj Karraygi	
