= Chakori =

1967 film

- Nadeem Baig and Shabana in Chakori
- Directed by: Captain Ehtesham
- Produced by: Fazal Dossani & Mustafiz
- Starring: Nadeem Baig; Shabana; Mirza Shahi
- Music by: Robin Ghosh (Won 'Best Music Director' Nigar Award for this film)
- Release date: 22 March 1967
- Country: Pakistan
- Language: Urdu

Chakori (Bengali: চকোরী Urdu: چکوری), is a Pakistani Urdu feature film. This film was released on 22 March 1967 on Eid-ul-Azha Day in Dhaka, East Pakistan (now Bangladesh). The film was directed by Captain Ehtesham.

It was Nadeem's and Shabana's debut film. The film ran for 81 weeks, and became a platinum jubilee film.

== Cast ==
- Nadeem Baig as Anwer/Anu
- Shabana as Chakori
- Reshma
- Mirza Shahi as Professor Patle Khan Footpathia
- Mustafa, Dear Asghar
- Jalil Afghani
- Irfan

== Music ==
Music director Robin Ghosh won the Nigar Award for Best Musician for this film.

== Songs ==
- Kabhi to tumko yaad ayengi Sung by Ahmed Rushdi, lyrics by Akhtar Yousuf and music by Robin Ghosh
- Kahan ho tum ko dhoondh rahi hain by Nadeem and Ferdausi Rahman
- Woh mere saamne tasveer bane baithe hain by Mujeeb Alam
- Woh mere saamne tasveer bane baithe hain by Ferdausi Rahman
- Khanak jaye re chaandi ka mora jhoomka by Ferdausi Rahman
- Pyaare pyaare yaar hamaare by Ahmed Rushdi
- Tujhe Chahein Meri Banhein by Ahmed Rushdi
- Rut Hai Jawan by Najma Niazi

== Box office ==
The film was a platinum jubilee hit film. It ran in cinemas for 81 consecutive weeks.

== Nigar Awards ==
Award	Recipient
Best Film	Producer: Mustafiz
Best Director	Ehtisham
Best Script	Atta Ur Rehman
Best Actor	Nadeem Baig
Best Musician	Robin Ghosh
Best Playback singer (Male)	Mujeeb Aalam (for the song: "Woh Mere Saamne Tasveer Bane Baithe Hain"

== Impact ==
Chakori was a debut movie of Nadeem Baig and launched his long and successful career as a superstar in Lollywood.
