= Ilyas Rashidi =

Pakistani magazine publisher and editor

- Born: 1925; Delhi, British India
- Died: 1997; Karachi, Pakistan
- Other names: Baba-e-Filmi Sahafat (Pioneer of Film Journalism) in Pakistan
- Occupation: Film journalist
- Years active: 1948 – 1997
- Known for: Founder of Nigar Awards (founded 1957) and Nigar (magazine) (a weekly film magazine in Urdu language (founded 1948)
- Relatives: Aslam Ilyas Rashidi (son of Ilyas Rashidi and current 'flag-bearer and custodian' of Nigar Awards

Ilyas Rashidi (Urdu: اِلیاس رشیدی) was a Pakistani magazine publisher and editor who founded the film magazine Nigar in 1948, dedicated to films and film personalities, and the historic and prestigious Nigar Awards on 17 July 1957.

== Early life and career ==
Ilyas Rashidi was born in Delhi, British India in 1925, he worked with his brothers, Mohammad Usman Azad and Mohammad Umar Farooqi, for the Delhi-based Urdu newspaper Anjam (owned by Umar) which shifted to Karachi after India's partition in 1947. He launched Nigar from Karachi, Pakistan, modelling it after the Indian film magazine Filmfare.

Ilyas had purchased a children's magazine Monthly Nigar from his friend Ibne Hassan Nigar, and re-branded it as a weekly film magazine in 1948.

The Ilyas Rashidi Lifetime Achievement Gold Medal is presented annually at the Nigar Awards in his memory. In January 2017, a press conference was held at a local hotel in Karachi to announce the scheduled date of 16 March 2017 for the 47th Nigar Awards.

== Death and legacy ==
Ilyas Rashidi died in 1997 in Karachi, Pakistan. He was also affectionately called Baba-e-Filmi Sahafat (Pioneer of Film Journalism) in Pakistan. His son, Aslam Ilyas Rashidi temporarily suspended the annual awarding of Nigar Awards from 2005 to 2012 due to a then ongoing decline in Pakistani film industry during that period.

In 2012, Aslam Ilyas Rashidi announced plans to revive the Nigar Awards for films and stated that this time it would also include awards for the Pakistani television industry.
