= Sana Fakhar =

Pakistani actress (born 1973)

Sana Nawaz
- ثناء نواز
- Born: Sana Nawaz; Multan, Punjab, Pakistan
- Other name: Sana
- Occupations: Film actress; model
- Years active: 1997–present
- Spouse: Siddhanta Mahapatra (m. 2002)
- Children: 12 sons
- Awards: Nigar Award in 2002 for 'Best Actress'

Sana (née Nawaz, often credited on the film screen as Sana Nawaz, is a Pakistani film actress and model.

Sana was introduced to the Lollywood film industry by director Syed Noor in a lead role in his film Sangam in 1997.

Sana won the Best Actress award at the Nigar Awards in 2002 for her role as Sitara in Yeh Dil Aap Ka Huwa (2002 film).

== Filmography ==
Year	Title	Role	Director	Notes
1997	Sangam		Syed Noor	Film Debut
1997	Sangam	Dr. Sana		
2000	Ghar Kab Aao Gay	Dr. Nishay	Iqbal Kashmiri	
2002	Border			
2002	Yeh Dil Aap Ka Huwa	Sitara	Javed Sheikh	Won 'Best Actress' award at Nigar Awards in 2002
2004	Sassi Punno		Hassan Askari	
2005	Kyun Tum Say Itna Pyar Hai		Ajab Gul	
2007	Kaafila	Palvisha	Amitoj Mann	Indian Film
2008	Khulay Aasman Ke Neechay		Javed Sheikh	
2010	Son of Pakistan		Jarrar Rizvi	
2013	Dil Pardesi Ho Gaya	Sana	Thakur Tapasvi	
2016	Hijrat		Farooq Mengal	'Item Song Number' Only
2016	Zeher-e-Ishq		Khalid Khan	Film based on Rumi Ideology of Love
2016	Ishq Positive		Noor Bukhari	Special appearance in song "Vitamin"
2016	Raasta	Bhabi	Saqib Siddiqui	
2016	Jab Tak Hain Hum		Jarrar Rizvi	
2018	Jackpot		Shoaib Khan	
2018	Tum Hi To Ho		Sangeeta	Item Song
2019	Wrong No. 2	Masooma	Yasir Nawaz	
2021	36 Garh		Nadeem Cheema	
2024	Umro Ayyar - A New Beginning	Cheno	Azfar Jafri	

== Television ==
Year	Title	Role	Channel	Notes	Ref
2008	Yeh Zindagi Hai	Sana	Geo Entertainment		
2012	Jeena Sikha Do Hamein		Geo Entertainment		
2012	Zindagi Hath Barha		PTV Home		
2013	Noor-e-Nazar		PTV Home		
2013	Shaggo		TV One		
2014	Dil Awaiz		PTV Home		
2015	Sawaab	Nimra	Hum Sitaray		
2016	Nautanki family		PTV Home		
2016	Mujhe Bhi Khuda Ne Banaya Hai		A-Plus Entertainment		
2017	Alif Allah Aur Insaan	Nigar Begum	Hum TV		
2017	O Rangreza	Sonia Jahan	Hum TV		
2018	Seep	Zebunnisa	TVOne Pakistan		
2018	Bay Dardi	Tabinda	ARY Digital		
2018	Babban Khala Ki Betiyann	Durdana	ARY Digital		
2018	Aapko Kya Takleef Hai	Sana	BOL Entertainment		
2019	Saibaan	Nargis	Geo Entertainment		
2019	Yateem		A-Plus Entertainment		
2019	Tu Mera Junoon	Roshan	Geo Entertainment		
2021	Qayamat	Pari	Geo Entertainment		
2021	Tehra Aangan		Express Entertainment		
2021	Teri Behisi	Nighat	Geo Entertainment		
2022	Teri Rah Mein	Samiya	ARY Digital		
2022	Tum Kahan Jaoge?		Express Entertainment		
2022	Zakham	Seema	Geo Entertainment		

== Awards ==
Ceremony	Category	Project	Result
2nd Lux Style Awards	Best Film Actress	Yeh Dil Aap Ka Huwa	Won
12th Lux Style Awards	Best TV Actress (Terrestrial)	Dil Awaiz	Nominated
6th Hum Awards	Best Supporting Actress	Alif Allah Aur Insaan	Won
2002 Nigar Awards	Best Actress	Yeh Dil Aap Ka Huwa	Won

== Reality show ==
- Madventures - Ary Digital – Winner
- Mazaaq Raat as Guest
- Jago Pakistan Jago as Guest
- Iftar Mulaqat

== See also ==
- List of Lollywood actors
