= Haathi Mere Saathi (1993 film) =

1993 film

- Directed by: Shamim Ara
- Produced by: Shamim Khurshid
- Starring: Reema; Mohsin Khan; Afzal Khan; Sahiba Afzal; Shafqat Cheema; Ismail Tara
- Music by: Wajid Ali Nashad
- Release date: 5 November 1993
- Country: Pakistan
- Language: Urdu

Haathi Mere Saathi is a 1993 Urdu-language Pakistani film. The English title is The Elephant Walk. This film was a Nigar Award winner for Best Film of the year 1993.

== Cast ==
- Reema Khan
- 'John Rambo'
- Sahiba Afzal
- Shafqat Cheema

All music is scored by Wajid Ali Nashad and the film director was Shamim Ara.

== Soundtrack ==
No.	Title	Singer(s)	Length
1.	"Tum Din Main Suraj"	Kumar Sanu, Asha Bhosle
