= Jannat Ki Talash =

1999 film

- Directed by: Hassan Askari
- Written by: Pervaiz Kaleem
- Produced by: Mohammed Younas
- Starring: Resham; Shaan; Sana
- Cinematography: Faisal Bukhari
- Music by: Zulfiqar Ali Atre; Badar Miandad; Film song lyrics by Ahmed Faraz and Ustad Daman
- Release date: 13 August 1999 (Pakistan)
- Country: Pakistan
- Language: Urdu

Jannat Ki Talash (Urdu: جنت کی تلاش, lit. 'In Search of Heaven') is a 1999 Pakistani film which won the Nigar Award for Best Film of the Year for 1999.

== Plot summary ==
Jannat Ki Talash is set around the year 1947, when Pakistan won independence and revolves around Salma (Resham). Salma and Faraz (Shaan) had been in love before the creation of Pakistan and were fiance's. While Faraz lived in Lahore, Salma lived what would become the partitioned India. They previously met each other frequently. The ethnic violence and rioting after the creation of Pakistan was announced led to the displacement and killing at a large scale where. Salma was presumed dead. It had been three years since her presumed death and Faraz's mother encourages him to marry his cousin Afsana (Sana), which he resists but later unwillingly accepts. However Salma returns to Pakistan, upon learning this Faraz hurries to the police station to bring her home. She is lifeless, pale and does not say a word. She is described by Faraz's aunt as a 'living corpse' not saying anything instead feeling powerless and depressed. Faraz feels despondent that the woman he once loved has turned into someone else. She does not speak until a turn of events take place and she is forced to defend herself in court. There Faraz forces her to talk of what happened to her in India and to defend herself. She finally speaks and talks of her experience.

== Cast ==
- Resham as Salma
- Shaan as Faraz
- Sana as Afsana
- Saud as Tara Singh
- Khushboo
- Abid Ali
- Shafqat Cheema
- Mustafa Qureshi
- Afshan Qureshi

== Awards ==
Year	Awards	Category	Winner	Result	Ref.
1999	Nigar Awards	Best Film	Jannat Ki Talash	Won	
1999	Nigar Awards	Best Director	Hassan Askari	Won	
1999	Nigar Awards	Best Writer	Naveed Pervaiz	Won	
1999	Nigar Awards	Best Actor	Shaan	Won	
1999	Nigar Awards	Best Actress	Resham	Won	
1999	Nigar Awards	Best Supporting actress	Sana	Won	
1999	Nigar Awards	Best Lyricist	Ahmed Faraz	Won	
1999	Nigar Awards	Best Playback female singer	Mehnaz	Won	
1999	Nigar Awards	Best Playback male singer	Asif Mehdi	Won	
