= Yeh Dil Aap Ka Huwa =

- Directed by: Jawed Sheikh
- Written by: Sherry Malik; Babar Kashmiri; Agha Hasan Imtisal
- Produced by: Akbar Khan
- Starring: Babar Ali; Veena Malik; Moammar Rana; Sana; Javed Sheikh; Saleem Sheikh
- Cinematography: Waqar Bokhari
- Edited by: William Watts
- Music by: Amjad Bobby
- Production company: Sonic Enterprises
- Distributed by: Sadaf Entertainment
- Release date: 19 July 2002
- Country: Pakistan
- Language: Urdu
- Box office: Rs. 13 crore (US$470,000)

Yeh Dil Aap ka Huwa (Urdu: یہ دِل آپ کا ہوا, lit. 'This heart is now yours') is a 2002 Pakistani Urdu film starring Sana, Moammar Rana and Saleem Sheikh among others. It was directed by Jawed Sheikh. The film's soundtrack is composed by Amjad Bobby.

The film won 8 Nigar Awards in 2002.

== Synopsis ==
The film revolves around the romance of Falak (Moammar Rana), a young Pakistani living in Switzerland who has unidentified yearnings for eastern culture, and Sitara (Sana) whose brother Zargul opposes their relationship.

== Release ==
The film was also released in London and the United States.

== Cast ==
- Moammar Rana as Falak
- Sana as Sitara
- Saleem Sheikh as Chaand
- Javed Sheikh as Jamal
- Badar Khalil
- Veena Malik as Pinki
- Babar Ali as Zargul
- Zoha
- Ismail Tara
- Shafqat Cheema as Inspector

== Awards ==
Year	Award	Category	Recipient(s)	Result
2002	Nigar Awards	Best Film	Akbar Khan	Won
2002	Nigar Awards	Best Director	Javed Sheikh	Won
2002	Nigar Awards	Best Script Writer	Babar Kashmiri	Won
2002	Nigar Awards	Best Actor	Moammar Rana	Won
2002	Nigar Awards	Best Actress	Sana	Won
2002	Nigar Awards	Best Supporting Actor	Saleem Sheikh	Won
2002	Nigar Awards	Best Supporting Actress	Veena Malik	Won
2002	Nigar Awards	Best Musician	Amjad Bobby	Won
