= Khoey Ho Tum Kahan =

2001 Pakistani film

- Directed by: Ajab Gul
- Written by: Ajab Gul
- Produced by: Saqib Khan
- Starring: Meera; Babar Ali; Naghma; Deeba
- Cinematography: Tehsin Khan
- Music by: Zain
- Release date: 27 April 2001
- Country: Pakistan
- Language: Urdu

Khoey Ho Tum Kahan (Urdu: کھوئے هو تم کہاں ) is a 2001 Pakistani Urdu film directed by Ajab Gul, with choreography by Ehtisham Ali Khan. The film starred Babar Ali, Ajab Gul and Meera. It earned 5 Nigar Awards, and performed well at the box office.

== Synopsis ==
It is a suspense thriller with a tilt on Meera character's issues. Her husband wants to kill her to get all her property and hires a killer to get rid of her. She survives the attack and eventually figures out that her husband wants her dead.

== Cast ==
- Meera
- Babar Ali as Sherry
- Ajab Gul

== Soundtrack ==
The music is composed by Zain.

#	Song	Singer(s)
1	"Khawabon Mein Koi Aanay Laga Hai"	Zain, Asma Lata
2	"Ek Haseen Nazneen Dulruba"	Zain
3	"Khoey Ho Tum Kahan"	Asma Lata
4	"Door Jana Na Mujh Se"	Zain
5	"Lagta Hai Jaisay Mujhe Pyar Ho Gaya"	Zain, Asma Lata
6	"Sari Dunya Ko Dushman Bana Kar"	Zain, Humaira Channa
7	"Mere Yaar Bata Kya Hota Hai Pyar"	Zain, Asma Lata
8	"Ya Meri Ban Ja Ya Mujh Ko"	Zain, Asma Lata
9	"Teri Yaad Mein Rona Chod Diya"	Asma Lata

== Awards ==
Year	Award	Film	Winner	Result
2001	Nigar Awards Best Film	Khoey Ho Tum Kahan	Saqib Khan	Won
2001	Nigar Awards Best director	Khoey Ho Tum Kahan	Ajab Gul	Won
2001	Nigar Awards Best screenplay	Khoey Ho Tum Kahan	..	Won
2001	Nigar Awards Best actor	Khoey Ho Tum Kahan	Ajab Gul	Won
2001	Nigar Awards Best actress	Khoey Ho Tum Kahan	Meera	Won
2001	Nigar Awards Best editor	Khoey Ho Tum Kahan	Z.A. Zulfi	Won
2001	1st Lux Style Awards Best film	Khoey Ho Tum Kahan	Saqib Khan	Nominated
