= Mehndi Waley Hath =

2000 Pakistani film

- Directed by: Syed Noor
- Written by: Syed Noor
- Produced by: Syed Noor
- Starring: Saima; Moammar Rana; Babar Ali; Nirma
- Cinematography: Shoaib Mansoor
- Music by: Zulfiqar Ali
- Release date: August 25, 2000
- Country: Pakistan
- Language: Punjabi

Mehndi Waley Hath (2000) is a Punjabi-language Pakistani film directed by Syed Noor starring Saima, Moammar Rana and Babar Ali.

Mehndi Waley Hath was Syed Noor's unofficial follow up to his 1998 film Choorian.

== Plot ==
The film begins with a voice over explaining the "cause" of the filmmakers in attempting to expose a "cruel custom"(as the poster said) that exists in the rural areas of the Punjab where women are married off (illegally) to the Quran so that the landowning families do not have to part with any of its wealth by giving the women their share in ancestral property. The action is based around the rural haveli of Vadda Saeen - the family elder, and his wife. They live in their sprawling estate together with the extended family that is usually warring with one another. There are also legions of slaves (ghulams) who devote themselves to the Vadda Saeen and show their love for their Saeen by kissing and nuzzling his feet!

The house contains two warring "bahu's", the benign, kindhearted widow Naghma and the Wicked-Super-Dyke-from-Hell Bahar. Naghma has a demented son, Babar Ali who shoots people for fun and a daughter, Saima, an overgrown 35-year-old teenager with an unhealthy pigeon fetish. Problems arise when it is discovered that the family will stand to lose a large segment of their land once Saima is wedded. The family elders, cajoled and abetted by Eyebrow Queen Bahar decide to adopt a plan where Saima is to get married, not to a handsome young prince but to the Holy Book. There are to be no festivities, no joy and little chance of children. Not only that, but she is to wear only white and must live with her husband in a deserted mausoleum! Naturally Saima, expecting marriage to a handsome young pigeon is rather depressed when she is banished to a life on the periphery. Matters start coming to a head when Rana returns from "frontline duty" to find that the girl of his dreams has been forced to wed the Quran and live in exile. He consults a nearby imam who tells him that such marriages are unrecognized by Islam and are simply an illegal schemes by which families attempt to retain their wealth. So, armed with this information, the hitherto timid Rana decides to take on the almighty family of Vadda Saeen, led by the dangerously psychotic Babar Ali.

First off, the movie must be commended for at least making an attempt to tackle a relevant issue in a language most likely to be understood by the masses. The film is also to be commended for avoiding the sleazy element associated with Punjabi movies. Syed Noor plays to the masses but avoids the smutty element quite successfully going for the wholesome style of "Choorian" instead. The film has some fairly decent tunes to help it along, but the pace starts slowing more and more as we approach the inevitable climax. Saima looks fetching and should be featuring in next years Film Award ceremonies for her acting in this film - yet she looks considerably older than her co-star Moammar Rana. Bahar eats up the screen and dominates as only she can while Nirma, as Babar Ali's trinket does not make much impression despite being given a sizzling number to perform. Nirma's future does not appear to be too bright.

Babar Ali ends up taking most of the acting accolades delivering a menacing performance as the evil brother Mattoo. He ought to forget about taking on romantic leads considering how average (to put it mildly) he looks and would be far better advised to stick to this sort of negative role, which he performed with such distinction here. Mehndi Waley Hath is at least not an outright embarrassment and is somewhat elevated by the "message" that it attempts to deliver. A feather in director/producer/screenwriter Syed Noor's cap - a rare commodity these days.

== Film business ==
When the film released, it did excellent business in the initial week or two before settling down for a steady run. The film achieved a six-month Silver Jubilee in many places in Punjab playing in regular shows (3 per day), which was great even if it barely matched the record-breaking success of film Choorian (1998). Mehndi Waley Hath was also nominated for 16 awards in 2000. Film song lyrics were written by Aqil Ruby and music by Zulfiqar Ali.

== Cast ==
- Saima as Shugi
- Moammar Rana as Sheikho
- Babar Ali as Mattu
- Bahar Begum
- Shafqat Cheema
- Nirma as Mattu's lover
- Naghma
- Umar Daraz Khalil
- Irfan Khoosat

== Awards ==
- Mehndi Waley Hath won 12 Nigar Awards in the Punjabi-language films category in 2000.
