= Nadia Khan =

Pakistani TV host and actress (born 1979)

- نادیہ خان
- Born: 22 May 1979 (age 47); Quetta, Pakistan
- Occupations: TV presenter, actor, producer
- Years active: 1993–present
- Spouse(s): Khawar Iqbal (m. 1990) (divorced) Faisal Mumtaz Rao (m. 2020)
- Children: 3
- Relatives: Mumtaz Hamid Rao (father-in-law)

Nadia Khan (born 22 May 1979) is a Pakistani television actress, presenter and producer. She is best known for hosting the Nadia Khan Show (2006–2013) and starring in Bandhan (1998), Aisi Hai Tanhai (2017), Kam Zarf (2019) and Dolly Darling (2019). She also started a YouTube channel OutStyle in 2017.

== Early life and education ==
Nadia Khan was born in Quetta, Pakistan to a Niazi family, one of the largest Pashtun tribes predominately residing in Afghanistan and northwestern Pakistan. Her father, Mohammed Aslam Khan, is a retired army colonel from Hoshiarpur, British India, and her mother, Tahira Khan, is a housewife from Sahiwal, Pakistan. Her father migrated to Lahore, Pakistan during the 1947 Partition of India and studied at Chistia High School before joining the Attabad-based Pakistan Military Academy in 1956. He served in the Pakistan Armed Forces from 1959 to 1986.

Khan completed her schooling from Federal Government Postgraduate College for Women, also known as C.B. College, that started as a small girls’ school on 26 Feb 1952 by the Rawalpindi Cantonment Board (RCB).

== Career ==
=== 1990s: Television debut and early work ===
Khan made her television debut in 1993 with Daak Time (1993–1995), a Pakistani children’s show hosted by Farooq Qaiser featuring an anthropomorphic puppet Uncle Sargam, that aired on Network Television Marketing (NTM). She was cast in Pal Do Pal (1995), a romantic-drama written by Haseena Moin and directed by Syed Ali Bukhari. She later appeared in Bharam (1997), Mahrukh (1997), and Bandhan (1998), for which she won the PTV Best Actress Award, Laag (1998–2000), Des Pardes (1999), Manzilein (2000).

=== 2000–2015: Return from hiatus and success as a presenter ===
In 2003, Khan began hosting ARY Digital's morning show Breakfast with Nadia comprising segments on celebrities, culture, and daily life. She moved to Geo Entertainment in 2006 to host the Nadia Khan Show, interviewing a variety of Pakistani celebrities, artists, performers, religious leaders, athletes and politicians including Fawad Khan, Iman Ali, Atif Aslam, Rahat Fateh Ali Khan, Shahid Afridi, Imran Khan, Bobby Deol, Farida Jalal, and Saroj Khan. Originally airing from 2006 to 2010, the show returned for a second and third season in 2012 and 2013 before being cancelled. Khan won two Masala Lifestyle Awards, organized by Dubai-based ITP Media Group and Masala! magazine, for the Best TV Presenter in 2008 and 2009.

During this time, she also starred in Haseeb Hassan's Koi To Ho (2005), Faisal Qureshi's Main Aur Tum (2008), and Ye Hai Zindagi (2008). In August 2011, Khan hosted the Eid Transmission on Dunya News. She hosted Croron Mein Khel, a game show, on BOL Entertainment.

In January 2018, Khan became the first Pakistani beauty, fashion and lifestyle YouTube influencer to reach 100,000 subscribers on her YouTube channel, Outstyle.

In 2019, she started a morning show again on PTV named Morning @ home.

== Personal life ==
In the 1990s, Khan married Khawar Iqbal, with whom she has two children. The couple divorced after ten years. She married Faisal Mumtaz Rao, a retired Pakistan Air Force fighter pilot and son of Pakistani electronic media journalist Mumtaz Hamid Rao, in December 2020. She adopted her third child in 2020, when he was 20 days old.

Khan describes herself as “realistic feminist” and advocates for female emancipation over imposing a level of moral culpability on men at large.

== Filmography ==
=== Television ===
Year	Drama	Role	Writer	Director	Broadcasting network	Notes
1995	Pal do Pal	Rameen	Haseena Moin	Mohsin	PTV	
1996	Baandhan	Farry	Bushra Rahman	Tariq Mairaj	PTV	PTV Best Actress Award
1997	Bharam	Zarmina	Izhar Bobby	M.Izhar Bobby	PTV	PTV Classic Drama Award
1997	Mahrukh	Mahrukh	Aftab Ahmed	Arshi Bhai	PTV	
1999	Des Pardes	Sara	Haseena Moin	Ali Rizvi	PTV	
1998	Laag	Safia	Rauf Khalid	Rauf Khalid	PTV	
2000	Manzilein	Ghazal	Seema Ghazal	Fahim Burny	PTV	
2005	Koi To Ho	Yasmeen	Danish Javed	Haseeb Hassan	ARY Digital	
2008	Main Aur Tum	Radha	Aljaz Imran	Faisal Qureshi	ARY Digital	Episode Sitaara Plus
2008	Yeh Zindagi Hai	Herself	Fizza Jaffri	Kamran Akbar Khan	Geo TV	Guest appearance
2017	Aisi Hai Tanhai	Kinza	Mohsin Ali	Badar Mehmood	ARY Digital	
2018	Zun Mureed		Amna Mufti	Syed Ahmed Kamran	Hum TV	
2018	Kaisi Aurat Hoon Main	Maham	Saima Akram Chudhery	Fahim Burney	Hum TV	
2018	Khana Khud Garam Karo	Jamila	Kashif Saleem	Kashif Saleem	ARY Digital	Telefilm
2019	Kam Zarf	Aima	Seema Munaf	Zeeshan Ahmed	Geo Entertainment	
2019	Jhanka Tanki	Neeli	Misbah Ali Syed	Kashif Saleem	ARY Digital	Telefilm
2019	Dolly Darling	Dolly	Dr. Muhammad Younis Butt	Muhammad Iftikhar Iffi	Geo Entertainment	
2022	Pehchaan	Safina	Rubina Kabira Khan	Asad Jabal	Hum TV	
2022	Wehshi	Muneera	Shumaila Zaidi	Iqbal Hussain	Hum TV	

=== Talk shows ===
Year	Show	Type	Broadcasting network	Notes
1993–1995	Daak Time (Mail Time) with Uncle Sargam	Children Choice	STN/NTM	Khan's hosting debut
2003–2006	Breakfast with Nadia	Morning show	ARY Digital	
2006–2010	Nadia Khan Show	Morning show	Geo TV	Masala TV Award For Best TV Presenter 2008 and Masala TV Award For Best TV Presenter 2009
2011	Eid with Nadia Khan	Eid special show	Dunya News	
2012–2013	[[Nadia Khan Show|The Nadia Khan Show (season 2)]]	Talk show (weekend nights)	Geo Entertainment	
2015	Nadia Khan Show (season 3)	Morning show	Geo Entertainment	
2018	Croron Mein Khel	Game Show	BOL Entertainment	
2019–2020	Morning @ Home	Morning Talkshow	PTV Home	

== Awards and recognition ==
=== PTV awards ===
Winner

- 1997: Best Actor (Female); Bandhan

=== Masala Lifestyle awards ===
Winner

- 2008: Best TV Presenter; Nadia Khan Show
- 2009: Best TV Presenter; Nadia Khan Show[1]
