= Tishnagi Dil Ki =

Pakistani television series

- Genre: Romantic drama
- Written by: Seema Munaf
- Directed by: Asim Ali
- Starring: Azfar Rehman; Anum Fayyaz; Kinza Hashmi
- Opening theme: "Har Pal Milli Tishnagi" by Rosemarry and Faakhir Mehmood
- Original language: Urdu
- Original title: ur
- No. of episodes: 30

Production
- Running time: 35-38min
- Production company: 7th Sky Entertainment

Original release
- Network: GEO TV
- Release: 8 March – 15 July 2017

Tishnagi Dil Ki (Eng; Thirst of Heart) is a Pakistani romantic drama serial that aired on Geo Entertainment. It was written by Seema Munaf, produced by Abdullah Kadwani and Asad Qureshi and directed by Asim Ali. The serial gained high ratings.

The serial marked the third joint appearance of Azfar Rehman and Anum Fayyaz, after Parvarish (2014) and Intezaar (2016) on ARY Digital and A-Plus Entertainment, respectively.

== Synopsis ==
“Tishnagi Dil Ki” is a story of college lovebirds Tabaan (Anum Fayyaz) and Zuhair (Azfar Rehman), who plan to marry after completing their studies. However their families and fate has something else planned. Zuhair's mother has already promised her sister to tie the knot between Zuhair and her niece Natasha (Kinza Hashmi). Zuhair, who is deeply in love with Tabaan, does not like Natasha at all, as Natasha is a self centered and arrogant girl.

On the other hand, Tabaan's father suffers a loss in his business and goes bankrupt. The risks get higher when his friend Ausaaf Kiyani (Javed Sheikh) offers him to help by marrying Tabaan. Considering her family's financial constraints, Tabaan agrees to marry Ausaf who is already married. Tabaan makes a life changing decision without informing Zuhair and cuts of all connection with him.

Tabaan suffers from atrocities in Ausaaf's house as his family isn't ready to accept her however, Tabaan tries her best to oblige everyone around her. Once again Tabaan's life is disrupted when Ausaaf suffers from a heart attack and dies. Before dying, Ausaaf instructed his close friend Khalid to take care of Tabaan. Khalid takes Tabaan's responsibility as his own daughter where Tabaan and Zuhair meet each other once again.

Will Tabaan and Zuhair able to love each other with their broken hearts? Or will they end up hurting themselves?

== Cast ==
- Anum Fayyaz as Taaba'an: Female protagonist who suffers difficulties after the death of her father and brother in a car accident. She is a patient and caring girl.
- Azfar Rehman as Zuhair: Taaba'an's college love who lives with Daadu, Mother, Khaala and Taaya jaan. He is in love with Taaba’an.
- Javed Shaikh as Ausaf: An aged businessman and friend of Taaba'an's father. Taaba’an married him because her father faced the collapse of his business, although Javed was already married, with a son of Taaba’an's age. After few months of marriage, he dies of heart attack.
- Kinza Hashmi as Natasha: Antagonist and arrogant, egocentric girl who wants to marry Zuhair. She does not have respect for anyone.
- Yasir Shoro as Sheharyar: Zuhair's cousin. Helps Taaba'an after she came in Zuhair's home as a maid. He was engaged to Natasha's sister Meena.
- Mohsin Gilani as Taaba'an's father: He dies in a car accident.
- Shaista Jabeen as Zuhair's mother: She wants her son to marry Natasha. She hated Taab'’an.
- Hashim Butt as Khalid: Shaheer's father and Zuhair's Taaya who brought Taaba’an in his house after he is entrusted by his friend Ausaf.
- Hina Rizvi as Naima: Natasha's mother, who conspires against Taaba'an and helps her evil daughter.
- Maryam Tiwana as Meena: Natasha's sister, a caring and soft-hearted girl. She supports Taaba’an while knowing that she was Zuhair's former girlfriend.
- Sabiha Hashmi as Hajira: Zuhair loved and obeyed her. She knows Taaba'an is an innocent girl so she plays an important part in patching things up between Zuhair and Taban.
- Beena Chaudhary as Ausaf's first wife: A greedy lady, who wants Ausaf's property that he handed over to Taaba’an before his death.
- Shahvaar Ali Khan as Ausaf's son: Cruel person who tortures Taban to tell him the truth about where she had hidden his father's property.
- Arsalan Raja as Anwar: Evil guy who helps Natasha's mother in her plans.
- Fahima Awan as Neelam: The wife of Ausaf's son–A kind lady who helped Taaba'an to escape from her husband. Later, she justified herself and told her husband that God had not blessed them with a child yet, because he was a cruel man who was torturing a lady for sake of property.
- Zuhab Khan as Faiz: Taban's brother who also dies in a car accident.

== Location ==
Drama is shot in northern Pakistan mainly in Murree and Nathia Gali. Scenes were also shot in Karachi.

Azfar stated, "Even though our team was very accommodating and professional, my experience shooting up north was not as colorful as I had expected. Basically the locals there weren't very facilitating and gave us a tough time shooting."

== Soundtrack ==
The original soundtrack of Tishnagi Dil Ki is sung and composed by Faakhir Mehmood and Rose Merry while the lyrics are penned down by Fatima Najeeb. The song is available on Patari.

== Release ==
The drama debuted on 8 March 2017. It ended on 17 July 2017 post Eid.
