= Nadia Khan Show =

TV entertainment show

- Title screen
- Also known as: Geo Mazay Say
- Genre: Talk show on weekends
- Created by: Nadia Khan
- Developed by: Geo Tv
- Presented by: Nadia Khan
- Voices of: Farooq Qaiser
- Narrated by: Farooq Qaiser
- Theme music composer: Khawar Javed
- Opening theme: Khawar Javed
- Composer: Khawar Javed
- Country of origin: Pakistan
- Original language: Urdu
- No. of seasons: 3
- No. of episodes: 700+

Production
- Production location: Islamabad
- Running time: 120 Minutes

Original release
- Network: Geo Entertainment
- Release: 13 November 2006 – 24 May 2013

Related
- Subh-e-Pakistan

Nadia Khan Show is a talk show on Pakistan TV channel Geo Entertainment, started in 2022 and hosted by presenter and producer Nadia Khan.

== Overview ==
The show aired on Geo Entertainment. It originally ran as a morning show from 2006 to 2010, then returned in 2012, as a nighttime talk show.

On 24 May 2013, it was announced on Facebook's official page that the show had ended. The morning show was revived in November 2015 on Geo Entertainment, after a gap of two years once Bushra Ansari's morning show Utho Geo Pakistan ended after a run of a month due to her prior commitments.

== Seasons ==
The first season was a morning show for about four years, and the programme became the first Urdu entertainment show to ever get a huge rating in Pakistan. After a one-year break and various reruns on Geo TV, NKS returned on GEO TV for Season 2 on 31 September 2012.

=== Season 1 ===
1st Season of the show premiered on 14 November 2006 from the Network’s Dubai Studios. The show airs (Mon-Sat) from 9am-11am.

The show featured interviews with celebrities, subject matter experts and members of the public.(Mondays, Wednesdays and Fridays). Interviews included Fawad Khan, Iman Ali, Atif Aslam, Rahat Fateh Ali Khan, Shahid Afridi, Imran Khan, Bobby Deol, Farida Jalal, and Saroj Khan.

The Magazine Edition was a mix of different segments on celebrity lifestyles, beauty tips, child care, entertaining talent shows and many exciting prizes (Tuesday and Thursday). On 22 July 2010, a talent hunt was also done by the show called the 'This Is It' campaign, a nationwide hunt for Pakistan's next top model. There was a short list of 45 candidates out of 150 finalists that were chosen from 12,000 profiles. Shaharzad Askari and Touseef were the winners of the campaign.

=== Season 2 ===
In season two, the show continued to cover a variety of topics. In addition, the audience was polled on the subjects covered. In its second season, 28 episodes were aired on Geo TV.

=== Season 3 ===
Geo Tv has picked up Nadia Khan Show again for a third season. It commenced in February 2013; broadcast on Friday and Saturday in the 6-8pm slot as an evening live show with an exciting, entertaining and informative format on 2 Feb 2013, with a new look and feel.

Segments

- Nadia Khan Diary
- NKS jockey Wid Zeeshan
- Cheap Boss
- Whatz up
- NKS Helpline
- Guest corner

== Episodes ==
=== Season 2 Episodes ===
Season Two : Episodes
Episode	Date 2012	Topic	Celebrity Guests	Specialists
1	31 March	Launch Show	Resham, Sarmad Sultan Khoosat, Nadia Jamil, Anna (fashion designer), Khawar Javed (singer), Shahida Mini, Dr. Omer Adil, Sabina Pasha, Kamiar Rokani, Anna (fashion designer), Bunty (Nadia’s friend) and Babloo.	
2	7 April	Pervez Musharraf	Laila (Actress), Sohail Warraich	
3	8 April	Veena Malik part 1	Babrik Shah (ex-husband), Khawar Riaz, Mukarram Kaleem	Ashiq Chudhary (critique), Dr. Sadaf (psychologist), Bunty (fashion photographer)
4	14 April	Veena Malik part 2	Babrik Shah (ex-husband), Khawar Riaz, Mukarram Kaleem	Ashiq Chudhary (critique), Dr. Sadaf (psychologist), Bunty (fashion photographer)
5	15 April	Role of journalists & News Media	Hamid Mir, Iftikhar Ahmad, Muhammad Malick	
6	21 April	Relationship Issues in Youth	Farhan Saeed, Sheraz Sikandar (model, boys’ representative), Tamara Saleem (student, girls’ representative)	Dr. Erum Bokhari (psychologist), Dr. Zarqa (cosmetic dermatologist), Maria Tauqeer (educationist), Suraj Baba (writer)
7	28 April	what are we eating ?	Mohsin Bhatti (consumer rights activist), Dr. Farzeen (nutritionist), Dr. Tauqeer (medical doctor and social activist)	Saeed Akhtar Ansari (Director Punjab Consumer Protection Council), Sajid Hussain Qureshi (senior chef), Mr and Mrs Mian Kausar Hameed (organic farmers)
8	29 April	Zong Sab Keh Do Special	Umer Sharif, Shazia Manzoor, Raheem Shah, Amanat Ali, Sanam Marvi, Rabi Peerzada	
9	5 May	Increasing Trend of Cross-dressing	Ali Saleem, Sakhawat Naz, Dr Omar Adil (writer)	Dr Zakria Zakir (sociologist), Almas Bobby (President Shemale Foundation of Pakistan), Irfan Urfi (writer)
10	6 May	Downfall & Revival Of Lollywood	Usman Peerzada (producer, director, actor), Bilal Lashari, Javed Raza, Shireen Pasha (documentary maker, Head NCA Film & TV Dept)	Nasir Adeeb (script writer), Ashiq Chaudhry (senior journalist), Bahar Begum, Aslam Dar (producer, director).
11	12 May	Reasons of plane crashes	Captain Umair Mian (commercial pilot, Pakistan Aviation), Shahid Zulfiqar (retired Air Marshal), Captain Natasha (trainee commercial pilot).	Mohsin Zahoor (President Lahore Flying Club), Tahir Saleem (Secretary Lahore Flying Club), Dr. Abrar Elahi Malik (surgeon and member of Medi Board CAA), Captain Rabia (trainee commercial pilot).
12	May	Mother's Day Special	Ali Moeen Nawazish (and Mrs Bushra), Aliya Rashid (and Mrs Bushra), Moeen Khan (and Mrs Ayesha Khan), Dr Zaman (and Mrs Raheela) and Ali and Zoya of The Others (and Mrs Aleena Uzair)	
13	19 May	Electricity Crisis in Pakistan	Ejaz Rafique Qureshi (DG PEPCO), Nadeem Bhatti (CM of FPCCI), Munawar Baseer (MD of PEPCO)	Muhammad Arshad Pervaiz (consumers’ representative), Fazeel Asif Jah (CEO of Power Holding (PVT) Ltd), Asad Mehmood (mechanical engineer), Hasan Rafique (student)
14	20 May	Exploitation of models in fashion industry part 1	Ahmed Butt, Khawar Riaz, Hareb (model)	Angeline Malick (actor, producer, director), Shaheel (model coordinator), Wajahat (talent manager)
15	26 May	Exploitation of models in fashion industry part 2	Ahmed Butt, Khawar Riaz, Hareb (model)	Angeline Malick (actor, producer, director), Shaheel (model coordinator), Wajahat (talent manager)
16	27 May	Obsession with looks and abuse of cosmetic treatment	Prof. Dr. Farid Ahmad Khan (Chairman Dept. of Plastic Surgery Mayo Hospital), Dr. Hamayun (plastic surgeon), Prof. Dr. Atif Kazmi (Head of Dermatology Department, King Edward Medical University, Mayo Hospital), Dr. Ali Kazmi (dermatologist)	Dr. Nosheeba Salman (aesthetic dermatologist), Dr. Omar Sheikh (cosmetic and surgical dermatologist), Dr. Zarqa Suharwardy Taimur (cosmetic dermatologist), Humaira Arshad (singer)
17	2 June	Extravagance in Pakistani Weddings	Mani (host, actor), Nadia Afghan (actor), Dr. Zakria Zakar (sociologist).	Maulana Raghib Naeemi (religious scholar), Tariq Bucha (social analyst), Faisal Waheed (wedding planner), Sofia Nilofer (matchmaker).
18	3 June	what are we eating part 2 ?	Mohsin Bhatti (consumer rights activist), Dr. Tauqeer Akhtar (medical doctor and social activist), Mehboob Ali Manji (Senior Member Punjab Food Authority).	Prof. Dr. Irshad Hussain Qureshi (Professor of Medicine, KE Uni Lahore), S.A. Hameed (former CM Punjab Taskforce for Essential Items), Adil Jahangir (restaurateur), Chef Saleem (bakery chef).
19	9 June	Joint Family vs. Nuclear Family part 1	Nouman Javed (singer), Ali Tahir (actor), Wajiha Tahir (actor)	Orya Maqbool Jaan (social analyst), Dr. Mohammad Nizamuddin (social scientist), Hafiz Tahir Ashrafi (religious scholar), Azhar Iqbal (family lawyer), Ayesha Kashif (psychologist), Shahzeena Sarfraz (working woman)
20	10 June	Joint Family vs. Nuclear Family part 2	Nouman Javed (singer), Ali Tahir (actor), Wajiha Tahir (actor)	Orya Maqbool Jaan (social analyst), Dr. Mohammad Nizamuddin (social scientist), Hafiz Tahir Ashrafi (religious scholar), Azhar Iqbal (family lawyer), Ayesha Kashif (psychologist), Shahzeena Sarfraz (working woman)
21	16 June	Investigation for a wedding proposal ?	Seemi Raheel (senior actor), Nisho (senior actor), Asim Sultan (journalist)	Rafia Rafique (psychologist), Muhammad Ikram (marriage bureau owner), Khawaja Asghar (parent), Mrs. Khawaja Asghar (parent), Irfan (boys' representative), Hanna (girls' representative)
22	23 June	Today’s Pakistani Drama Industry	Jamal Shah, Asghar Nadeem Syed (writer), Faheem Burney (director, producer), Azfar Rehman (model, actor), Esheeta (actor)	Neelam Shaheen (psychologist)
23	24 June	Importance of Working women	Mussarat Misbah (entrepreneur, beauty expert, social worker), Moneeza Hashmi (electronic media consultant, women’s rights activist), Roshaneh Zafar (social entrepreneur)	Maulana Raghib Naeemi (religious scholar), Khawaja Amjad Saeed (economist), Rahla Rahat (sociologist), Imrana Zoraiz Lashari (psychologist)
24	30 June	Road Accidents part 1	Gohar (musician), Anoushe Asad (actor, host), Mustafa (singer), Ahmad Faraz (senior crime reporter)	Dr. Rizwan Naseer (DG Rescue 1122), Dr. Javed Akram (CEO Jinnah Hospital), Syed Mohammad Amin Bokhari (SP Traffic Lahore), Asad Bokhari (criminal lawyer), Dr. Iram Bokharey (psychologist)
25	1 July	Road Accidents part 2	Gohar (musician), Anoushe Asad (actor, host), Mustafa (singer), Ahmad Faraz (senior crime reporter)	Dr. Rizwan Naseer (DG Rescue 1122), Dr. Javed Akram (CEO Jinnah Hospital), Syed Mohammad Amin Bokhari (SP Traffic Lahore), Asad Bokhari (criminal lawyer), Dr. Iram Bokharey (psychologist)
26	8 July	Weight Loss Obsession	Nadia Hussain (model), Sana Askari (actress), Saim (fashion designer)	Dr. Tauqeer (medical doctor, social activist), Dr. Farzeen (nutritionist), Professor Saad Malik (psychiatrist)
27	14 July	spouses cheating on their partners	Dr. Durdana Butt (actor, educationist), Shahida Mini (singer, actor)	Sadia Sohail (marriage counselor), Dr. Ahmed Usman (sociologist), Hafiz Tahir Ashrafi (religious scholar), Umar Rasheed (family lawyer), Dr. Rafia Rafique (psychologist)
28	15 July	How to treat domestic helpers ?	Sophia Sohail (actress, hostess), Sumbal Shahid (actor, host, singer), Riffat Haider Bokhari (ASP)	Sheraz Nisar (crime reporter -Jang), Sajida Parveen (domestic staff provider), Imran Hur Shah (lawyer), Ahmed Faraz (Senior Crime Reporter –Geo News), Dr. Naumana Amjad (psychologist)

== Awards and recognition ==
Nadia Khan won the Masala Tv Awards For Best TV Presenter for her performance in this show.

=== Masala Lifestyle Awards ===
Winner

- 2008: Best TV Presenter; Nadia Khan Show
- 2009: Best TV Presenter; Nadia Khan Show
