= Faaslay =

2025 Pakistani television series

- Genre: Drama
- Written by: Moona Syed; Content Vibes
- Directed by: Fahim Burney
- Starring: Saboor Aly; Ali Ansari
- Country of origin: Pakistan
- Original language: Urdu

Production
- Producer: Tehreem Chaudhary
- Production company: Multiverse Entertainment

Original release
- Network: Green Entertainment
- Release: December 5, 2025

Faaslay is a Pakistani television series directed by Fahim Burney. The series stars Saboor Aly and Ali Ansari in lead roles. The first episode aired on Green Entertainment on 5 December 2025.

== Plot ==
The series follows Ainy and Zaviyar, childhood friends whose relationship is affected by differences in their social circumstances and family expectations. Ainy aspires to establish a restaurant, while Zaviyar works as an architect. Their personal ambitions and family disagreements create difficulties in their relationship, eventually leading to an unexpected marriage.

== Cast ==
- Saboor Aly as Ainy
- Ali Ansari as Zaviyar
- Azfar Rehman as Adil
- Saba Hameed as Zeenat
- Mishal Kareem as Nida
- Tara Mahmood as Kishwar Jahan
- Ayesha Sohail as Saba
- Hunzala Lashari as Sikandar
- Syed Afzal Ali as Shakeel Ahmed

== Production ==
Faaslay was directed by Fahim Burney and written by Moona Syed. Tehreem Chaudhary produced the series under the banner of Multiverse Entertainment. The drama brought real-life married actors Saboor Aly and Ali Ansari together in leading roles. Their previous on-screen collaboration was the television series Naqab Zan (2019).
