= CMK (disambiguation) =

CMK may refer to:

- Central Milton Keynes, the central business district of Milton Keynes, Buckinghamshire, England
- Centralna Magistrala Kolejowa, a long railway line in Poland
- cmk, an extinct Chemakum language once spoken by the Chemakum (ISO 639:cmk)
- Croron Mein Khel, a Pakistani gameshow aired on BOL Entertainment
- Crabbet/Maynesboro/Kellogg, a label for specific lines of "Domestic" or "American-bred" Arabian horses
