= Croron Mein Khel =

Pakistani television game show

- Genre: Game show Reality
- Presented by: Nadia Khan; Maria Wasti; Zainab Qayyum; Sanam Jung
- Country of origin: Pakistan
- Original language: Urdu
- No. of seasons: 2
- No. of episodes: 238

Production
- Production location: Karachi
- Running time: 60 Minutes

Original release
- Network: BOL Network
- Release: 6 December 2018 – 22 April 2020

Croron Mein Khel (CMK) (Urdu: کروڑوں میں کھیل, romanized: Rolling in tens of millions) is a Pakistani gameshow that was broadcast on BOL Entertainment. Its first host was Nadia Khan. It is one of the most famous gameshows in Pakistan. Its slogan is "Kyunke yeh khel hai croron ka" (English: Because This Game is of Millions). Until 2020 it was hosted by Maria Wasti. The show format is similar to Who Wants to Be a Millionaire?.

== History ==
The first episode of Croron Mein Khel was aired on 6 December 2018 (five days after BOL Entertainment Release). The first episode's guest was Reema Khan.

== Episodes ==
No.	Guest(s)	Date of broadcast
1	Reema Khan	6 December 2018
2	Faysal Qureshi	7 December 2018
3	Imran Abbas	13 December 2018
4	Danish Taimoor	14 December 2018
5	Syed Jibran	20 December 2018
6	Ayesha Omer	21 December 2018
7	Hina Dilpazeer	27 December 2018
8	Sonya Hussain	28 December 2018
9	Imran Ashraf	3 January 2019
10	Hina Altaf	4 January 2019
11	Aijaz Aslam	10 January 2019
12	Azfar Rehman	11 January 2019
13	Javed Sheikh	17 January 2019
14	Junaid Khan	18 January 2019
15	Zahid Ahmed	24 January 2019
16	Nauman Masood	25 January 2019
17	Shahood Alvi	31 January 2019
18	Meera	1 February 2019
