= Muthi Bhar Chaawal =

Pakistani television series

- Written by: Iqbal Rizvi
- Story by: Rajinder Singh Bedi
- Directed by: Sangeeta
- Starring: Resham; Ahsan Khan
- Theme music composer: M. Arshad
- Opening theme: Humera Channa
- Country of origin: Pakista
- Original language: Urdu
- No. of episodes: 25

Production
- Executive producer: Seema Taher Khan
- Producer: Asghar Mirza
- Cinematography: Nain Maniar
- Production company: Airwaves Media

Original release
- Network: TV One
- Release: 2008 – 2008

Muthi Bhar Chaawal is a Pakistani television series directed by Sangeeta and originally aired on TV One in 2008. The series is based on the director's own film of the same name which in turn was based on the classic Urdu novella, "Ek Chadar Maili Si" by Rajinder Singh Bedi. The series stars Resham and Ahsan Khan with Babar Ali in a guest role.

Ahsan Khan teremd his part and the series one of his career favourites.

== Plot ==
The story revolves around a village adjacent to Kotla Railway station, where Rano lives with her three children, her husband, Tiloka, his parents, and his younger brother, Mangal. Tiloka, the sole breadwinner of the family, earns a livelihood by driving a tonga. Due to his habit of consuming alcohol, Rano often fights with him. One day, Tiloka drops a female passenger from Gurdaspur, Shanti, at the village's Dharamshala, where she is assaulted by its owner, Meharban Daas. The next day, Shanti's brother arrives and learns from her that she was taken there by Tiloka. In a fit of rage, he murders Tiloka instantly, and the police arrests him and Meharban Daas for their crimes. The family shatters due to the untimely death of Tiloka. His mother, Jindo, blames Rano for this, and Jindo's behaviour further devastates her. After the death of his elder brother, Mangal comes to his senses and starts earning a livelihood by driving his brother's tonga. Rano's neighbours advise her to marry Mangal, but she refuses angrily, stating that she has brought him up like her younger brother. They decide to put forward the proposal through the Panchayat. The Panchayat's Sarpanch, Giyani, comes to Rano's house and asks the family to arrange their marriage. Mangal doesn't approve of this and runs away at the time of the marriage ceremony. He is, however, brought back and married off to Rano. The couple's dynamic remains the same after their marriage. However, Mangal's childhood friends and neighbours, Bali and Bindo, who had wanted to marry him, are heartbroken. Bindo accepts the fate, but Bali considers it Mangal's betrayal and decides to kill him through her brothers by calling him late at night to the fields. Mangal couldn't go there because Rano stopped him at night, and Bali's brother mistakenly kill a donkey there. In return, the Panchayat orders them to compensate the donkey's owner for the loss. After the incident, Bali's brothers arrange a suitable suitor for her, and she is married off soon, after which Mangal takes a sigh of relief. The financial condition of his family improves, and he and Rano accept the new dynamic of their relationship.

A few years pass, and Shanti's brother Suljeet Singh is released from the prison before the completion of his sentence. He goes to the Dharamshala to avenge the murder of his sister, where Meharban Daas has also been released. While living in the village, Suljeet comes across Bari, the daughter of Rano and Tiloka, and learns that he had killed her father without any fault on his part. Meharban Daas learns about Bari's frequent secret meetings with Suljeet and decides to tarnish their honour. He tells Mangal about Bari and Suljeet's meetings, suspecting that he will fight with Suljeet and one will kill the other as a result. However, Mangal doesn't kill Suljeet when Suljeet ensures that they have done nothing wrong. Meharban Daas then threatens Giyani to defame Suljeet and Bari after which he decides to marry them to maintain the peace in the village. Suljeet kidnaps the younger brother of Meharban Daas and openly confronts him, telling Meharban Daas that his younger brother is in his possession. Meharban Daas tries to kill him but cannot because of his brother. At last, he goes to the ruins outside the village, suspecting that Suljeet has kept his brother there. There, his brother dies after falling from the wall, and Suljeet tries to kill Meharban Daas, but the villagers arrive and stop him. He runs away to the forest, where he dies from a snakebite. Suljeet leaves with the villagers and Giyani who asks him to live in his house as his son, to which he agrees. He takes Suljeet's marriage proposal for Bari to Rano's family, and the family accepts it. At the time of the ceremony, Rano comes across the groom and recognises him as the same person who was arrested for her husband's murder. She announces that the marriage should be called off, but Suljeet asks for forgiveness, saying that he had gone blind in his thirst for revenge. Rano's family and Giyani convince her to forgive him and consider her daughter's happiness, to which she agrees, and everyone at the ceremony starts enjoying themselves.

== Cast ==
- Resham as Rano
- Ahsan Khan as Mangal Singh
- Babar Ali as Tiloka Singh
- Fareeha Jabeen as Jindo
- Rashid Mehmood as Meharban Daas
- Hanan Sameed as Nawab Dil
- Ayesha Haq as Bali
- Bilal Khan as Suljeet Singh

== Soundtrack ==
The original soundtrack of the serial was performed by Attaullah Khan Esakhelvi.

== Production ==
In August 2007, it reported that Sangeeta will made TV series on her classical Urdu film Mutthi Bhar Chawal for which she considered Meera, Saima Noor and Resham to portray the leading character. Later that year, it confirmed that Resham will play the leading character in the series that was played Sangeeta herself in the film.

== Reception ==
Writing for the DAWN Images, Fouzia Mapara praised Resham's performance stating that she is "in the right role as she totally surrenders herself to the role", and further noted the camera work, title song and the rustic backdrop, but found the portrayal of violence as tacky.

=== Accolades ===
Year	Awards	Category	Recipient/ nominee	Result	Ref.
2009	Lux Style Awards	Best TV Play	Airwaves Media	Nominated	
2009	Lux Style Awards	Best TV Actress - Satellite	Resham	Nominated	
