= Xarb =

Xerb
- Origin: Lahore, Pakistan
- Genres: Blues, Classic Rock, Qawwali
- Years active: 2008–present
- Members: Raheem "Sunny" Shabhaz; Muhammad "Lala" Ahsan; Saud Anver; Mobeen Zahid; Qamar Parvi

Xarb is a five-member band from Lahore, Pakistan. The band was formed in 2008 and achieved its current membership in 2011. The band received increased public attention in 2018, when they performed on the third and fourth seasons of the show "Pepsi Battle of the Bands", eventually finishing second in the competition. The band's style has been described by both its members and local music critics as a fusion of Western rock genres and local musical influences. They continue to play live at venues within Pakistan.

== History ==
Xarb is composed of five members: the band's bass guitarist, Raheem "Sunny" Shabhaz, its drummer, Muhammad "Lala" Ahsan, it's Guitarist, Saud Anver, from Faisalabad, its guitarist/singer-songwriter, Mobeen Zahid, from the United Arab Emirates, and its lead vocalist and keyboardist, Qamar Parvi, from Rawalpindi. Shabhaz and Ahasan are natives of Lahore, while Anver, Zahid, and Parvi moved there to pursue graduate studies at Lahore's University of Engineering and Technology.

Although Anver, Zahid, and Parvi first played together in 2008, the same year that they graduated from university, the band only achieved its present membership in 2011, when Shabhaz and Ahsan joined after they were introduced to the group by its former bassist, Zia. The band's members have played with many other local bands since the band's creation, including "Mothership", "Draine", "Ahsan", and "Raheem" before the band was brought together by Saud.

Xarb's first music video, "Baysabro", was released in April 2014. The song was composed as an anti-war song, and the video featured Afghan refugee children. The video won an award at the local LUMS Music Festival and went on to be screened at several international film festivals.

In 2017 Shabhaz and Ahsan temporarily joined the band "Badnaam" to compete in the second season of Pepsi Battle of the Bands, and American Idol-style show in which local competed against one another each week, with viewers voting on their favourite bands to determine who wins. Xarb themselves did not compete in 2017's Pepsi Battle of the Bands because they heard about the registration for the competition too late, but they later noted how Badnaam's participation in the competition had improved their popularity.

In 2018 Xarb was a popular contestant in the third season of the Pepsi Battle of the Bands. They eventually finished second-place, beaten by a rival local band, Bayaan. Throughout the season Xarb's performances were praised by in-studio judges as "consistent", having "all the potential in the world", reminiscent of the older Pakistani musician Attaullah Khan Esakhelvi, and being an interesting fusion of blues, country music, and Desi influences.

In 2019 Xarb produced a music video for their song "Deewar". The video featured "a woman struggling to run ahead while being held back by ominous masked folk." The theme of the video was interpreted by local reviewers as "breaking free from whatever shackles you". Xarb's release of this video followed a positive reception following their performance of the song (as guest performers) in the fourth season of Pepsi Battle of the Bands.

Mobeen, the group's guitarist, learned to play guitar during his last year at university. In 2020 he wrote and produced the musical score for the short film "Darya Ke Iss Paar".

Xarb continues to play live at regular venues in Pakistan.

In 2023, Xarb directed and did the background score for the Shoaib Sultan's movie Gunjal along with Rahat Fateh Ali Khan.

== Style and influences ==
Xarb's music has been interpreted by local Pakistani critics as a blend of Western blues and classic rock with Pakistani Qawwali. Many of Xarb's songs have been interpreted as modern reflections on traditional Sufi themes, though they have categorised themselves as a contemporary band.

The band has cited numerous musical influences in their interviews. Local musical influences cited by members of Xarb include Mehdi Hassan, Ghulam Ali, Farida Khanum, Abida Parveen, Nusrat Fateh Ali Khan, Vital Signs, Junoon, and Gumby. International musical influences cited by the band include Pearl Jam, The Who, Led Zeppelin, AC/DC, Red Hot Chili Peppers, Tool, Porcupine Tree, Victor Wooten, John Bonham, Keith Moon, Danny Carey, Chad Smith, Dave Abbruzzese, Stevie Ray Vaughan, Pete Townshend, and B.B. King.

In addition to their own original music, the band has produced covers of songs from Noor Jehan, Shahnaz Begum, Nayyara Noor, and Nusrat Fateh Ali Khan.

== See also ==
- Xarb's music on Soundcloud

== Bibliography ==
- Ahmad, Onusha. "Xarb: The Perfect Blend of Qawwali and Rock". Geo News. August 23, 2018. Retrieved on February 12, 2023.
- "Mobeen Zahid". Images. Retrieved on February 12, 2023.
- Images Staff. "Xarb Wants You to Break Barriers in Their New Music Video". Images. December 3, 2019. Retrieved on February 12, 2023.
- Aijaz, Rahul. "Xarb, Bayaan Fight it out One Last Time". The Tribune. August 27, 2018. Retrieved on February 12, 2023.
- Majeed, Shahir. "The Hottest New Band From PBoB: 'Xarb'". The Wailay Log. 2018. Retrieved on February 12, 2023.
- Mangobaaz Studio. "Here's EVERYTHING You Need To Know About ‘Xarb' From Pepsi Battle Of The Bands". August 5, 2018. Retrieved on February 12, 2023.
- Mazhar, Zahrah. "XARB: Fine-Tuning Rock Music in Pakistan". Youlin Magazine. June 25, 2014. Retrieved on February 12, 2023.
- Sabeeh, Maheen. "Pepsi Battle of the Bands 3 Crown Bayaan Winners". The News. September, 2018. Retrieved on February 12, 2023.
