= Azfar Rehman =

Pakistani model, TV host and actor

- Born: 7 June 1984 (age 42); Karachi, Sindh, Pakistan
- Occupations: Actor; Model; Host; Video Jockey
- Years active: 2006–present

Azfar Rehman (Urdu: اظفر رحمان) is a Pakistani model, VJ, TV host and actor.

He has acted in Dugdugi, Ladies Park, Sitamgar, Baityaan, Mehar Bano aur Shah Bano, Noor Pur Ki Rani, Mohabbat Rooth Jaye Toh and Phir Chand Pe Dastak. He also played the roles of Sheharyar in Aatish and Raheel in Qadam Qadam Ishq.

He also hosted three seasons of the reality show Miss Veet Pakistan.

He has been hosting the Morning Star with Azfar Rehman on TV One since January 2022.

== Early life ==
Azfar Rehman is of Kashmiri descent, born in Karachi on 7 June 1987.

== Career ==
He started his career as a model for commercials when he was 16 and, in 2006, he got his TV break as the host of a celebrity talk show called Spotlight with Azfar Rehman, before turning to acting, describing himself as a method actor.

He made his acting debut with the ARY Digital serial Kaisa Yeh Junoon, in 2007.

== Filmography ==
Key
| † | Denotes film / drama that has not released yet |
| † | Denotes films / drama that are currently on cinema / on air |

=== Television ===
| Year | Title | Role | Channel | Notes | Ref |
|---|---|---|---|---|---|
| 2007 | Kaisa Yeh Junoon | | ARY Digital | Nominated for Best TV Actor-Satellite category of 8th Lux Style Awards, Dialogues by Haseena Moin | |
| 2007 | Yaad Tu Ayengay | special appearance | Geo TV | Written by Khalil-ur-Rehman Qamar | |
| 2007 | Chalte Chalte | | ARY Digital | | |
| 2008 | Rang Birangi | | ARY Digital | | |
| 2009 | Baityaan | | Hum TV | | |
| 2009 | Noor Pur Ki Rani | Nofil | Hum TV | | |
| 2009 | Roza Ke Rozay | | ARY Digital | Ramadhan Special Serial | |
| 2010 | Chand Pe Dastak | | Hum TV | Broadcast during Ramadan | |
| 2010 | Dil-e-Abad | | Hum TV | Based on Urdu novel Dil-e-Abad by Riffat Siraj | |
| 2011 | Dugdugi | Azfar | ARY Digital | Sitcom | |
| 2011 | Qurbat | | ARY Digital | | |
| 2011 | Ladies Park | Sam | Geo TV | Written by Muhammad Younis Butt, Directed by Nadeem Baig | |
| 2011 | Bichday Toh Ahsaas Hua | | A-Plus TV | Directed by Barkat Sidiki | |
| 2011 | Phir Chand Pe Dastak | | Hum TV | A sequel of Chand Pe Dastak | |
| 2011 | Kaala Jadoo | | ARY Digital | | |
| 2011 | Mohabbat Rooth Jaye Toh | Asad | Hum TV | Written by Faiza Iftikhar | |
| 2012 | Happily Married | | ARY Digital | Directed by Wajahat Rauf | |
| 2012 | Mehar Bano aur Shah Bano | brother of the sisters | Hum TV | Written by Seema Ghazal | |
| 2012 | Sitamgar | Adil | Hum TV | | |
| 2013 | Bunty I Love You | | Hum TV | written by Khalil-Ur-Rehman Qamar | |
| 2013 | Ishq Mein Teray | Saad | Hum TV | | |
| 2013 | Tanhai | Mohsin | Hum TV | | |
| 2013 | Ek Pagal Si Larki | | Hum TV | | |
| 2014 | Dhol Bajnay Laga | | Hum TV | Ramadan special | |
| 2014 | Parvarish | Raffay | ARY Digital | Written by Momina Khursheed Ali | |
| 2014 | Band Khirkyon Kay Peechay | | TV One | | |
| 2014 | Janam Jali | Adeel | Hum TV | | |
| 2015 | Tere Baghair | Salman | Hum TV | Directed by Owais Khan | |
| 2015 | Mohabbat Aag Si | Wajahat | Hum TV | Directed by Syed Ahmed Kamran | |
| 2015 | Mohabbat Ho Gai Tum Say | Ayzer | TV One | Written by Haseena Moin | |
| 2015 | New York Se New Karachi | | TV One | | |
| 2015 | Surkh Jorra | Roman | Hum Sitaray | | < |
| 2015 | Meray Dil Meray Musafir | Zaryab | TV One | | |
| 2015 | Tumhari Natasha | Ahmer | Hum TV | | |
| 2015 | Mein Adhuri | Sooban | ARY Digital | | |
| 2016 | Hatheli | Salman | Hum TV | Written by Mustafa Hashmi | |
| 2016 | Intezaar | Azmeer | A-Plus TV | Directed by Kashif Nisar | |
| 2017 | Nazr-e-Bad | Pervez | Hum TV | | |
| 2017 | Mere Humnavaa | Haris | ARY Digital | Written by Rahat Jabeen | |
| 2017 | Khoobsurat | Burhan | Urdu1 | | |
| 2017 | Adhi Gawahi | Hamdan | Hum TV | Written by Saima Akram Chaudhry | |
| 2017 | Tishnagi Dil Ki | Zuhair | Geo TV | Directed by Asim Ali | |
| 2017 | Mere Charagar | Mueed | Geo Kahani | Written by Ruksana Nigar Adnan | |
| 2017 | Khidmat Guzar | Mukhtar | A-Plus TV | Directed by Faheem Burney | |
| 2018 | Teri Meri Kahani | Ibrahim | Hum TV | | |
| 2018 | Aatish | Sheheryar | Hum TV | | |
| 2019 | Qadam Qadam Ishq | Raheel | A-Plus TV | | |
| 2020 | Saza e Ishq | Faris | Express Entertainment | Directed by Fahim Burney | |
| 2020 | Aik Aur Munafiq | Bilal | Geo TV | Episode: Jhatka | |
| 2021 | Tehra Aangan | Faris | Express Entertainment | | |
| 2021 | Aakhir Kab Tak | Zafar | Hum TV | Syed Ali Raza Usama | |
| 2021 | Dour | Abban | Geo TV | Mazhar Moin | |
| 2021–22 | Bisaat | Jahanzaib | Hum TV | | |
| 2022 | Dil Zaar Zaar | Rayyan | Geo Entertainment | | |
| 2022 | Zakham | Affan | Geo Entertainment | | |
| 2022 | Angna | Taimoor | ARY Digital | | |
| 2023 | Mere Ban Jao | Fardeen | Hum TV | | |
| 2023 | Adan | Faraz | Aan TV | | |
| 2024 | Dil Manay Na | | Green Entertainment | | |
| 2025 | Ism E Yaran | | Hum Tv | | |

==== Anthology series ====
| Year | Title | Role | Channel | Notes | Ref |
|---|---|---|---|---|---|
| 2011 | Sharek-e-Hayat | Zohaib | Hum TV | | |
| 2012 | Kitni Girhain Baaki Hain | Abbas | Hum TV | | |
| 2012 | Sasural Ke Rang Anokhay | | Hum TV | | |
| 2019 | Choti Choti Batain | Sarim | Hum TV | | |
| 2020 | Haqeeqat; Episode Malal | Almer | A plus | | |
| 2023 | Pyar Kay Naghmay; Nargis Kay Phool | | TV One Pakistan | | |

==== Telefilms ====
| Year | Title | Role | Channel | Notes | Ref | |
|---|---|---|---|---|---|---|
| 2008 | Mili Ali Ko Mili | Ali | Hum TV | | | |
| 2010 | Mere Sapnon Ki Rani | | Hum TV | Eid Special | | |
| 2010 | Shaadi Vaadi Pyaar Vyaar | | Hum TV | Eid Special | | |
| 2010 | 2011 | Kya Item Hai? | | Ary Digital | | |
| 2010 | 2011 | Do Daant Ki Mohhabat | | Hum TV | Eid Special | |
| 2010 | 2011 | 2012 | Izhaar | | | |
| 2010 | 2011 | 2012 | Yeh Guriya Meri Hai | | PTV Home | |
| 2010 | 2011 | 2013 | Eidi Nahi Milegi | | Hum TV | Eid Special |
| 2010 | 2011 | 2013 | Sirf Tum | Misbah | Hum TV | |
| 2010 | 2011 | 2014 | Yaad | Saim | Hum TV | |
| 2014 | 2011 | RungRaiz Mera | Tallal | Hum TV | | |
| 2014 | 2011 | Chupke Chupke Pyar | | Hum TV | Eid Special | |
| 2015 | Ek Our Ek Gyarah | Murad | Hum TV | | | |
| 2017 | Chand Aur Chanda | | | | | |
| 2017 | Kasam Sey | | | | | |
| 2017 | Judai | Danish | Urdu1 | | | |
| 2018 | Ek Chance Pyar Ka | Shahzaib | Hum TV | | | |
| 2019 | Jhanka Tanki | | Ary Digital | Eid Special | | |
| 2019 | Apni Apni Love Story | Sameer | Ary Digital | Eid Special | | |
| 2021 | Romantic Razia | Rameez | Geo Entertainment | | | |
| 2026 | Humrahi | Aurangzaib | Geo Entertainmemt | | | |

=== Films ===
| Year | Film | Role | Director | Notes | Ref. |
|---|---|---|---|---|---|
| 2015 | Manto | Passenger | Sarmad Khoosat | Guest for the song Kya Hoga | |
| 2017 | Punjab Nahi Jaungi | Vasay | Nadeem Baig | | |
| 2019 | Chhalawa | Sameer | Wajahat Rauf | Lead role | |

=== As a Host ===
- (2006) | Spotlight | Host | TVOne Pakistan
- (2006) | AAJ Entertainment Tonight | AAJ News

== Awards and nominations ==
| Ceremony | Category | Project | Result |
|---|---|---|---|
| 8th Lux Style Awards | Best TV Actor (Satellite) | Kaisa Yeh Junoon | Nominated |
| 14th Lux Style Awards | Best TV Actor | New York Se New Karachi | Nominated |
