= Pyar Hi Pyar Mein =

Pyaar Hi Pyaar Mein
- Directed by: Fahim Burney
- Produced by: Syed Afzal Ali
- Starring: Anchal; Ashaal; Meera
- Cinematography: Faisal Bokhari
- Music by: Wajid Ali Nashad
- Release date: 4 April 2003
- Country: Pakistan
- Language: Urdu

Pyar Hi Pyar Mein (Urdu: پیار ہی پیار میں) is a 2003 Pakistani film directed by Fahim Burney. The film generated considerable hype prior to its release but was a commercial failure.

== Plot ==
Sara (Anchal) and Ashal (Ashal) are partners in the academy who are in love. Ashal dreams of becoming rich before getting married and encounters someone who can make his dreams a reality, Nisha.

Nisha, enamored by Ashal, sweeps him off to Dubai to establish a branch of the academy. Ashal becomes involved with her, and Nisha creates hurdles to make Sara marry a business tycoon, Akhter.

Ashal spots Sara dancing at a nightclub. After a couple of dance sequences, Ashal discovers that the woman he has been pursuing is not Sara but her twin sister Anchal. He discovers she has a fiancé, Sameer.

To reunite with her mother and sister, Ashal brings Anchal and her fiancé to Pakistan and discovers Sara has become a widow. She gives birth to a son. Her stepmother-in-law arranges for her to be kidnapped to coerce her to marry her younger son and keep the family's wealth.

== Cast ==
- Ali Tabish
- Anchal
- Nisha
- Nisha Mei (girl on Facebook)
- Meera
- Wasif Butt

== Accolades ==
Ceremony	Category	Recipient	Result
3rd Lux Style Awards	Best Film Director	Fahim Burney	Nominated
3rd Lux Style Awards	Best Film Actor	Ashaal	Nominated
