= Hum Sub Umeed Se Hain =

TV situation comedy show

- Genre: Political satire, comedy, Slapstick
- Created by: Muhammad Younis Butt
- Written by: Muhammad Younis Butt
- Directed by: Fawad Wyne Anjum Shehzad
- Presented by: Veena Malik (2007–2008); Mehwish Hayat (2008, 2013–14); Saba Qamar (2009–2013, 2014–15); Hira Mani (2012); Meera (2014); Naseem Vicky (2014–15); Alif Noon (2015)
- Country of origin: Pakistan
- Original language: Urdu
- No. of seasons: 15
- No. of episodes: 574

Production
- Executive producer: Imran Aslam
- Producer: Rauf Afaq
- Running time: 60–62 minutes (per episode)

Original release
- Network: Geo TV; Geo News
- Release: 14 July 2007 – 26 December 2015

Related
- Miss Fire; S.H.E.

Hum Sub Umeed Se Hain (Urdu: ہم سب امید سے ہیں, lit. 'We Are All Expecting') was a political satire show, which featured funny segments on Pakistani political issues.

Hosted by Saba Qamar, Fiza Ali and Mehwish Hayat, the show was divided into 3 versions. The first one was 'Midweek Version' hosted by Mehwish Hayat, the second was 'Extra Version' hosted by Fiza Ali and the third was 'Weekend Version' hosted by Saba Qamar. Earlier this show was also hosted by actress Veena Malik, Sara Chaudry, Hira Salman, Kiran Tabeer, Mathira and Arisha Razi.

This show started airing in July 2007. Due to its popularity, it aired till 2015 and was finished in 2015 due to ban on Geo Entertainment.

== Production ==
It is written by the Pakistani TV programs screenwriter and humorist Muhammad Younis Butt.

== Plot ==
The program mostly makes fun of corrupt and lazy politicians who always somehow sneak into the political process and get elected. This show's TV artists try to portray them in their situational comedy. The show also covers current affairs topics in Pakistan in a humorous way. The show mocks the Pakistani politicians and presents the Pakistani political issues in funny segments. In addition to other characters, each episode has a guest, who mocks an international or national politician. It usually deals with current events. It was also hosted by Nabeel And Khwaja Aslam in 2004–2005.

== Series overview ==
Season | Host	No. of episodes	Originally broadcast (Pakistan)	
Season | Host	No. of episodes	First episode	Last episode
1	212	14 July 2007	27 December 2008

== Hosts and cast ==
- Veena Malik as host (Host of the show for 2007 and 2008 TV season)
- Saba Qamar as Resham (Host of the show for 2009–2013, 2015 TV seasons)
- Meera as herself (Host of the show for 2014 TV season)
- Fiza Ali as News host (Host few episodes)
- Mehwish Hayat as Newscaster (Host few episodes)
- Arisha Razi as Nunni (Host few episodes)
- Mathira as News interviewer (Host few episodes)
- Naseem Vicky as Naseem (Stand-up Comedian)
- Hira Mani as Advertisement lady (Appeared in few episodes)
- Rubina Arif as Firdos Ashiq Awan (Appeared in some episodes)
- Adla Khan as Morning show host (Appeared in some episodes)
- Uroosa Qureshi as Meera interviewer (Appeared in some episodes)
- Alif Noon (Stand-up Comedian)

== Segments ==
- Ek Din Hum Sub Umeed Se Hain Ke Saath
- News Fuse
- News Muse
- Nokri.com
- As You Wish
- After News
- After Shocks
- ANP Channel
- B-Ads
- Bezti Idol
- C.I.D
- Cross Match
- Coffee With Sheikh
- Channel R
- Door 2 Door
- Meera Point
- Pakistan Avengers
- Parody Song
- Punch Policy
- Phelay Tolo Phir Bolo
- Signal Banned
- Side News
- Sochna Vi Naa
- Show Time
- Show Shah
- C News
- Bachay Ghair Siyassi Hoty Hain
- Boiling Point
- Broken News
- Bezti Idol
- Extra Tez
- Food News
- Future Ads
- Final Song
- Model Siyast Dan
- Top Flop
- Ticket Tantrum
- Totkay
- Rap Battle
- Rigging Point
- Returning Point
- Round The Clock
- Z Man
- O Teri
- Films
- Farmao Farmao
- Lie Detector
- Love 2013
- Love 2014
- Love 2015
- Load Shedding Time
- Larry King Still Alive
- Pakistan Idle
- Yeh Bandhan Tu Iqtadar Bandhan Hai
- Hasna Mana Hai
- Old Is Gold
- Laugh Line
- Gupshup
- Inklaab
- Billo Online
- Sur Naak
- Super 4
- Sur Tiiter Bitter (Sur Kshetra)
- Geo P.I.R.
- Geo F.I.R. 2050
- Under Score
