= Jeeva (1995 film) =

1995 Pakistani film

- Directed by: Syed Noor
- Written by: Syed Noor
- Produced by: Suhail Butt
- Starring: Babar Ali; Resham; Nadeem; Neeli; Javed Sheikh; Ghulam Mohiuddin
- Cinematography: Ali Jan
- Music by: M. Arshad
- Production company: Eveready Pictures
- Release date: 3 March 1995
- Running time: 169 minutes
- Country: Pakistan
- Language: Urdu

Jeeva (Urdu: جیوا) is a 1995 Urdu Pakistani film directed by Syed Noor. The film introduced Babar Ali and Resham into Lollywood. Nadeem played the title role alongside Resham and Babar Ali. Playback singer Anwar Rafi is in this film. Folk singer Shaukat Ali sang a duet with Noor Jehan. Jeeva was a Platinum Jubilee movie. The music was by M. Arshad.

== Plot ==
Jeeva, A tribal Pathan leader attacks a rival pashtun clan harbouring a drug trafficker killing the drug lord and members of the pashtun clan. the two remaining sons of the clan pledge to take revenge for the killings until one of them Gul falls for Jeeva's daughter Dilaara.

== Cast ==
- Nadeem as Jeeva
- Deeba as Deeba
- Resham as Dilaara
- Babar Ali as Gul
- Javed Sheikh
- Neeli as Bando
- Ghulam Mohyuddin as Neko Singh
- Mustafa Qureshi

== Songs ==
- "Januun Suun Zara, Palkain Tau Uthha" sung by Anwar Rafi, song lyrics by Saeed Gillani, music by M. Arshad. Singer Anwar Rafi won the 'Best Male Singer' Nigar Award for this film in 1995.
- "Chhu Lay Agar Tujhko Hawa, Tau Lagta Hai Yeh Mujhko Burra", sung by Anwar Rafi and Humaira Channa, song lyrics by Saeed Gillani and music by M. Arshad.
