= Zun Mureed =

Pakistani television drama series

- Urdu: زن مرید
- Genre: Romance; Family drama
- Written by: Amna Mufti
- Directed by: Ahned Kamran
- Starring: Nadia Khan; Omair Rana; Ayesha Gul
- Theme music composer: Sahir Ali Bagga
- Country of origin: Pakistan
- Original language: Urdu
- No. of seasons: 1
- No. of episodes: 28

Production
- Producer: Moomal Shunaid
- Production company: Momina Duraid Productions

Original release
- Network: Hum TV
- Release: 2 March – 8 September 2018

Zunn Mureed or Zann Mureed (Urdu: زن مرید; lit: Uxorious) is a 2018 Pakistani drama television series that premiered on 2 March 2018 on Hum TV. It is directed by Ahmed Kamran and written by Amna Mufti. The 28-episode series stars Nadia Khan and Omair Rana in lead roles. The serial is produced by Momina Duraid under her production company MD Productions.

It aired on Hum Pashto 1 under the same title.

== Cast ==
- Nadia Khan as Tabassum
- Omair Rana as Sajjad
- Hina Khawaja Bayat as Maryam
- Kashif Mehmood
- Ayesha Gul
- Sami Khan Jr. as Bobby (Child star)
- Javeria as Bobby's sister (Child star)
- Khalid Anam as Khalid
- Shamim Hilaly as Amma

== Soundtrack ==
Zun Mureed - OST

Soundtrack album by Sahir Ali Bagga and Beena khan
- Released: 3 June 2018
- Recorded: 2018
- Genre: Television soundtrack
- Length: (4:00)
- Language: Urdu
- Label: Hum TV

Music video
- "Zun Mureed " OST on YouTube

The title song was sung by Sahir Ali Bagga and Beena Khan. The music was composed by Sahir Ali Bagga and the lyrics were written by Ali Zaryoun.

== Production ==
Omair Rana disclosed that during filming, the cast, including Hina Khawaja Bayat, were unaware of the series' ending despite being halfway through production. Additionally, Rana expressed concerns over a scene where his character divorces his wife over the phone, deeming it unrealistic, after which his lines were rewritten.
