= Bilal Khan (actor) =

Pakistani actor (1978–2010)

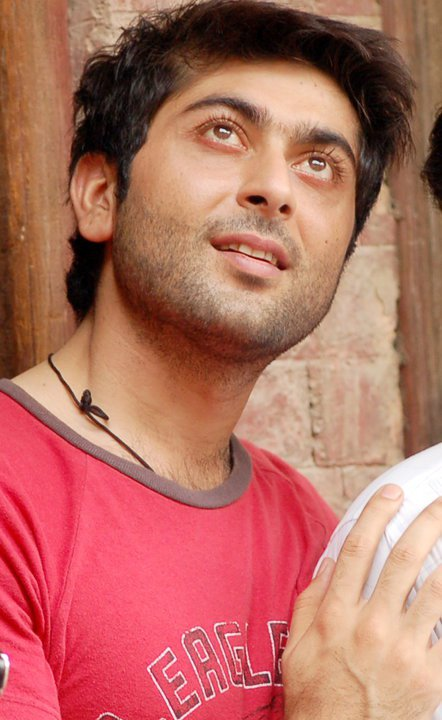
- Born: Bilal Khan; 15 August 1978
- Died: 14 August 2010 (aged 31)
- Occupations: Actor and model

Bilal Khan (Urdu: بلال خان) (15 August 1978 – 14 August 2010) was a Pakistani television actor and model, known for some of his lead roles in major Pakistani drama serials. Khan previously acted in Pakistani movies and the ATV serials such as Dehli kay Bankay and Pal Bhar Mein. He came to prominence after starring in the 2002 Lollywood release Pehla Sajda.

Khan injured severally in an accident of gas explosion on August 11, 2010, and died off due to the resulting injuries on August 13. One of his last roles was a guest appearance in the 2010 drama serial Dastaan.

== Death ==
On 11 August 2010, Khan was critically injured during an accidental gas explosion at a guest house in Islamabad, where he was staying for the shooting of a television production. He died from his injuries a day before his 32nd birthday, on 14 August 2010, in Pakistan Institute of Medical Sciences. He was laid to rest in Fateh Jang, his native town.

== Television ==
Year	Title	Role	Notes
2007	Khuda Gawah	Kamran	
2008	Muthi Bhar Chaawal	Suljeet Singh	
2010	Dastaan	social worker	Guest appearance
