= Ladies Park =

2011 Pakistani drama comedy serial

- Genre: Drama; Comedy
- Written by: Muhammad Younis Butt
- Directed by: Nadeem Baig
- Starring: Mahnoor Baloch; Humayun Saeed; Nadia Hussain; Asif Raza Mir; Arjumand Rahim; Shahood Alvi; Ayesha Omar; Hina Dilpazeer; Azfar Rehman; Sana Askari
- Country of origin: Pakistan
- Original language: Urdu
- No. of episodes: 22

Production
- Running time: 40–45 minutes

Original release
- Network: Geo Entertainment
- Release: 22 February 2011

Ladies Park (Urdu: لیڈیز پارک) is a 2011 Pakistani drama comedy serial broadcasting by Geo Entertainment. It is directed by Nadeem Baig and written by Muhammad Younis Butt, casting Mahnoor Baloch, Humayun Saeed, Nadia Hussain, Sana Askari, Asif Raza Mir, Arjumand Rahim, Shahood Alvi and Ayesha Omar. It was first aired on 22 February 2011.

== Plot ==
The series revolves around the lives of four couples and their trials and tribulations. When Sonia, Saba, Natasha and Rubina meet in a neighbourhood park every day, they share each other's problems as they take their evening walk. Apart from recreation, this is a time when these women bare their souls to each other, console each other and try to solve each other's problems by lending a helping hand; this often leads to hilariously catastrophic results.

== Cast ==
- Mahnoor Baloch as Soniya
- Humayun Saeed as Sarmad (Sarmi)
- Nadia Hussain as Saba
- Asif Raza Mir Saba's husband
- Arjumand Rahim as Rubina
- Shahood Alvi as Kulsoom's husband
- Sana Askari as Ayesha
- Ayesha Omar as Natasha
- Hina Dilpazeer as Kulsoom
- Azfar Rehman as Sam
- Beo Zafar as Bee Jee
- Noor Hassan Rizvi as Sameer
