= Sitamgar (TV series) =

- Screen title
- Genre: Drama; Romance
- Written by: Sarwat Nazeer
- Directed by: Fahim Burney
- Starring: Angeline Malik; Nadia Hussain; Sajal Aly; Azfar Rehman; Ali Afzal; Sunita Marshall; Faisal Rehman
- Country of origin: Pakistan
- Original language: Urdu
- No. of episodes: 20

Production
- Producer: Momina Duraid

Original release
- Release: 18 October 2012 – 7 March 2013

Sitamgar (Urdu: ستمگر, lit. 'Tormentor') is a Pakistani romantic drama television series directed by Fahim Burney, broadcasting on Hum TV every Thursday between October 2012 to March 2013. The series is written by Sarwat Nazir, and stars Sajal Aly opposite Faisal Rehman, with an ensemble supporting cast of Angeline Malik, Nadia Hussain, Azfar Rehman, Sunita Marshall, and Ali Afzal.

This show was broadcast on Indian channel Zindagi from 28 November 2015.

== Plot ==
The story starts with Zoya (Sajal Aly) wandering around a mall in Dubai, where she finds a cute doll she wants to buy. At the same time, Zohaib (Faisal Rehman) sees the same doll and pleads with Zoya to give it to him. Zoya disagrees, saying she found it first and leaves with it. Upset by this, Zohaib walks away and sits on a bench when Zoya comes to him and gives him the doll. A few hours later, he finds Zoya sitting alone as the car has broken down. Zohaib offers her a ride home, where she asks him to play loud music and does very childish things. Suddenly, she faints, and Zohaib takes her to the hospital, where he finds out she's anorexic and hasn't eaten for days. On learning that Zoya is in the hospital, Sheena (Angeline Malik), Zoya's Ani, rushes to the hospital to see her. On seeing Zohaib with Zoya, she questions Zoya about him, and Zoya says he's her boyfriend. Annoyed by this, Zohaib quickly escapes and goes back home.

Meanwhile, in Pakistan, Zohaib's wife Zahra (Sunita Marshall) is shown visiting her sister's house, where she meets Asad (Hassan Ahmed), her sister's brother-in-law, who had proposed to her years ago. Zahra had rejected Asad as she was in love with Zohaib, leaving Asad heartbroken for the rest of his life. Zahra is always annoyed by his presence as she thinks he wants to make her feel guilty for rejecting him. Zohaib returns to Pakistan and gifts his daughter the doll Zoya gave him. On seeing the gift tag with Zoya's name, Zahra questions Zohaib about her, and he explains to her everything that happened in Dubai. When he goes to work a few days later, he learns that Zoya is his boss Shiraz's (Ali Afzal) daughter. On seeing how uninterested Zoya is in his business, Shiraz asks Zohaib to train her and make her as hard-working as he is. When it is Zoya's birthday, and her dad leaves for a business trip, Zohaib arranges a party for her to cheer her up, only forgetting that it's his wedding anniversary the same day. As they dance playfully, Zeba (Nadia Hussain), Shiraz's partner, walks in and questions them. Zoya hates Zeba and chases her away, and talks to her harshly. Meanwhile, Zahra is waiting for Zohaib at home. He arrives home late and tries to make it up to Zahra by dancing with her, but he still thinks of Zoya.

On Shiraz's arrival, he asks Zohaib to take Zoya to an art gallery so she can buy a painting she likes. Zoya buys a painting for Zohaib and goes to his house to give it to his wife, where she tells her about the birthday party that Zohaib had given her. Zeba tells Shiraz what she saw the other day and how she thinks that Zohaib is using her to get Shiraz's money. Shiraz immediately sends Zoya back to Dubai against her will, where Zoya meets Adil (Azfar Rehman), who is staying at Ani's house. She becomes very silent and unhappy and feels alone. Zoya starts missing Zohaib and even tries to call him. Sheena gets worried when she sees Zoya in this condition. Sheena tries to turn her into the old Zoya, but nothing works. She refuses to marry Adil when her father asks her to since she is in love with Zohaib. Shiraz has taken the Dubai assignment away from Zohaib and given it to someone else. Zohaib asks Zoya to help him in vain, but she refuses and seeing Zohaib's greed, she gets engaged to Adil. At this time, Zeba and Shiraz also get married. Zohaib gets his Dubai project back and meets Zoya again. After having coffee with her and Adil, he finds that Zoya forgot her phone and goes to her house to return it to her. Zoya expresses her love to Zohaib, and Zohaib finds that he loves her too. They start dating, and she becomes the same Zoya again. Sheena realises that something suspicious is going on and meets Zohaib. She tells Zohaib to leave Zoya alone. Realising that everyone is mistaking his love for greed, Zohaib leaves his job at Shiraz's company and returns to Pakistan to sort things out with Zahra.

In Pakistan, he realises that Zahra and his daughter depend on him and is unsure about abandoning them. He tells Zoya he cannot marry her and that she should forget him. Zoya, heartbroken, agrees to this and continues her relationship with Adil. One day, Zoya suddenly faints and is rushed to the hospital. They find that Zoya is suffering from a Brain Tumor and is in her last stage. Adil, scared to marry a sick person, breaks his engagement with Zoya and returns to Australia. Shiraz soon arrives and finds out that Adil has left. Zoya calls Zohaib and tells him what has happened. Zohaib becomes tense and tells her that he loves her and will come to see her. Zahra overhears him and cries, but lets Zohaib go. Zohaib goes to Dubai and meets Zoya. He makes her lively again and eventually marries her. Zahra is devastated by this news. During this time, Asad comes to help and takes care of her daughter. He slowly tries to cheer her up and feels he has almost won her over. Zoya again faints, and when taken to the hospital, she finds out she is pregnant. On hearing this, Zeba objects to her pregnancy, saying that she is too sick to be pregnant, but Shiraz doesn't pay much attention to her. Zeba soon starts to get jealous of Zoya and asks Shiraz for their child, so Zoya's child will not inherit all of Shiraz's empire. Zahra's sister asks her to marry Asad, which she agrees to.

Asad's mother is dying and asks Zahra to decide in Asad's favour. After his mother's death, Asad misses her and asks Zahra to marry him. Zahra says nothing and leaves the room. Soon, Zohaib sends Zahra divorce papers, which she signs against her will. Zeba pressures Shiraz to give her a child, to which he says no. She accuses him of only loving Zoya and wanting to give his whole empire to her, to which he replies that the money is not his but his ex-wife's and according to her will, the money now belongs to Zoya and her children. After hearing this, Zeba leaves him. Zohaib starts missing Zahra and his daughter. He tries to call them and finds out what has happened. He asks Zoya if they can keep his daughter with him, to which Zoya agrees. They return to Pakistan, where on seeing Zohaib, Zahra hugs him and professes how much she has missed him. Asad sees this and leaves forever, carrying all of Zahra's memories in his heart. Zohaib tells Zahra that he only married Zoya to give her happiness in her last few days. Zoya overhears this and faints. Eventually, Zoya gives birth to a girl and asks Zahra to be her mother, to which Zahra agrees, and afterwards, Zoya dies.

Zahra takes care of Zoya's daughter, named after Zoya. Zohaib asks her to forgive him, to which she says she has forgiven him, but it will take her time to forget everything he has done to her.

== Cast ==
- Angeline Malik as Sheena
- Nadia Hussain as Zeba
- Sajal Aly as Zoya
- Azfar Rehman as Adil
- Ali Afzal as Shiraz
- Sunita Marshall as Zahra
- Faisal Rehman as Zohaib
- Hassan Ahmed as Asad

== Soundtrack ==
Sitamgar

Soundtrack album by Sohail Haider
- Genre: Theme song
- Length: 5:25
- Language: Urdu
- Producer: Momina Duraid

Sitamgar's OST is composed and sung by Sohail Haider and the lyrics are written by Sabir Zafar.

Track list
No.	Title	Singer(s)	Length
1.	"Sitamgar"	Sohail Haider	5:25
