= Ahmed Habib Ki Betiyan =

Television series

- Official Intertitle of the show
- Genre: Soap opera Family drama Romance
- Written by: Sheema Kamal
- Directed by: Nadeem Siddique
- Starring: Sajal Aly; Anum Fayyaz; Kiran Haq; Farah Nadeem; Qaiser Naqvi; (For entire cast see below)
- Country of origin: Pakistan
- Original language: Urdu
- No. of seasons: 1
- No. of episodes: 89

Production
- Producer: Momina Duraid
- Running time: 18 minutes approx.

Original release
- Network: Hum TV
- Release: 12 December 2011 – 14 May 2012

Ahmed Habib Ki Betiyan (Urdu: احمد حبیب کی بیٹیاں, lit. 'Ahmed Habib's daughters') is a Pakistani soap opera television series broadcast by Hum TV. It was directed by Nadeem Siddique and written by Sheema Kamal. Shabbir Jan, Sajal Aly, Anum Fayyaz, and Kiran Haq portrayed some of the main characters.

The show was also broadcast by Hum Sitaray in 2016, and in the UK on Hum Europe in 2019.

== Cast ==
- Shabbir Jan as Ahmed Habib
- Annam Fayyaz
- Farah Nadeem
- Sajal Aly as Ayeza
- Yasir Shoro
- Kiran Haq
- Nisa Khan as Ayesha
- Farah Nadir
- Tipu Sharif as Faisal
- Qaiser Naqvi
- Anita Fatima Camphor
- Khalid Anum

== See also ==
- List of programs broadcast by Hum TV
