= Khuda Gawah (TV series) =

- Title screen
- Written by: Asif Ali Pota
- Directed by: Sohail Iftikhar Khan
- Starring: Arbaaz Khan; Saba Qamar; Nayyar Ejaz; Jana Malik; Deeba; Badar Khalil; Bilal Khan; Shamil Khan; Laila Zuberi
- Theme music composer: Wajid Ali Nashad
- Composer: Wajid Ali Nashad
- Country of origin: Pakistan
- Original language: Urdu
- No. of seasons: 1
- No. of episodes: 24

Production
- Producer: Asif Ali Pota
- Production location: Pakistan
- Cinematography: Adil Askari
- Editor: Tahir Ali
- Production company: Atv

Original release
- Network: ATV
- Release: January 2007 – 2007

Khuda Gawah (transl. God is my witness) is a Pakistani action romance television series that was aired on 2007 on ATV. The drama is directed by Sohail Iftikhar Khan, written by Asif Ali Pota, with music by Wajis Ali Nashad. The cast includes Arbaaz Khan, Saba Qamar and Nayyar Ijaz. The series is the adaptation of the 1992 Indian film Khuda Gawah which starred Sridevi, Amitabh Bachchan and Danny Denzongpa.

== Cast ==
- Arbaz Khan
- Saba Qamar as Sonia
- Nayyar Ijaz
- Rustam
- Aurangzeb Eshai
- Shamil Khan as Abdullah
- Bilal Khan as Kamran
- Mohsin Gillani
- Anwar Khan
- Ashraf Rahi
- Humayun Gull
- Rasheed Ali
- Khawar Butt
- Sharjeel
- Anjum
- Saleem Hassan
- Wali Shah
- Shahzeeb
- Deeba
- Laila Zubari
- Rabia Tabasum
- Jana Malik as Memoona
- Minal
- Kiran Shah
- Straberro
- Nadi Begum
- Badar Khallil
