= Subah Be Daagh Hai =

- Genre: Drama
- Directed by: Junaid Masood Khan
- Starring: Yumna Zaidi; Humayun Ashraf; Anum Fayyaz
- Country of origin: Pakistan
- Original language: Urdu

Production
- Producers: Momina Duraid; Geeti Masood
- Cinematography: Suleman Razzaq
- Editors: Kashif Ahmad; Wasim
- Running time: 109 minutes
- Production company: MD Productions

Original release
- Network: Hum TV
- Release: 29 November 2014

Subah Be Daagh Hai is a 2014 Pakistani television film produced by Momina Duraid under their banner MD Productions. It stars Yumna Zaidi, Humayun Ashraf and Anum Fayyaz.

== Cast ==
- Yumna Zaidi as Ayesha
- Humayun Ashraf as Zain
- Anum Fayyaz as Natasha
- Shehryar Zaidi as Malik Sahib: Natasha's father
- Seema Sehar as Natasha's mother
- Kaiser Naqvi as Ayesha's maternal grandmother
