= Fahim Burney =

Pakistani director and producer

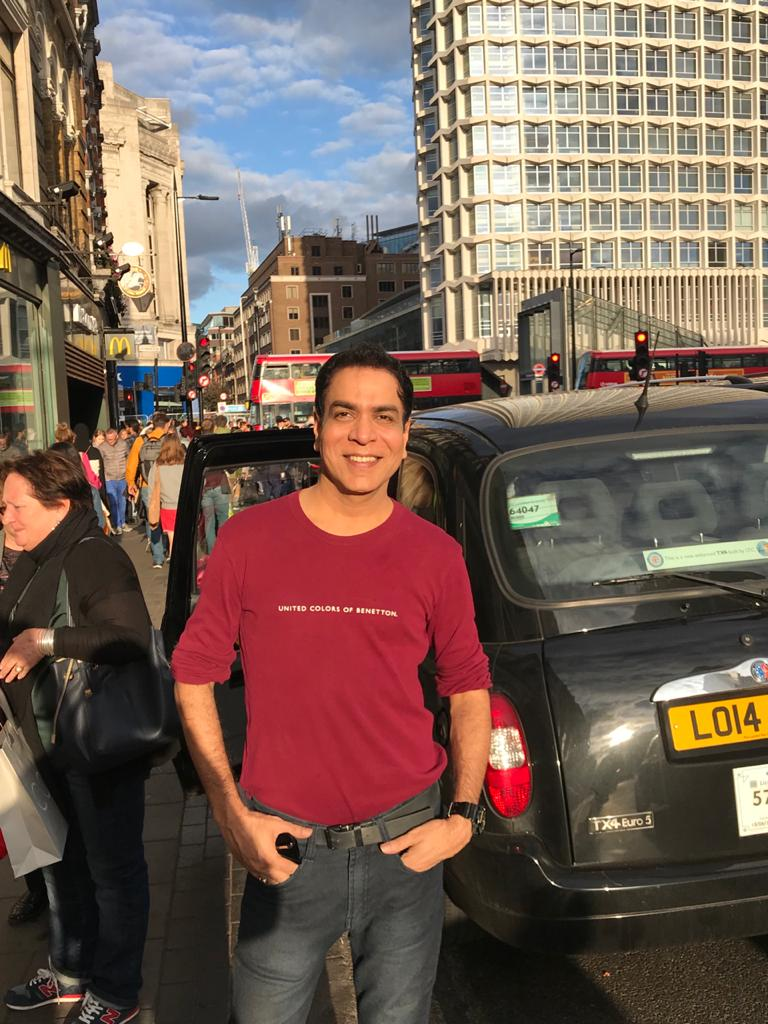
- Born: Lahore, Punjab Pakistan
- Occupations: Director; producer
- Years active: 2003–present

Fahim Burney is a Pakistani television director and producer. Mostly known for his work in Urdu television industry, he has directed and produced several television series. His debut film Pyar Hi Pyar Mein (2003) earned him a Lux Style Award nomination for Best film director. He also got a Best TV director nomination for Kabhi Aye Naa Judai (2007) at the 8th Lux Style Awards.

== Career ==
Burney set up his production company in Karachi in the early 2000s.

== Filmography ==
=== Film ===
Year	Title	Ref.
2003	Pyar Hi Pyar Mein	

=== Television ===
Year	Title	Director	Producer	Ref.
2006	Piya Kay Ghar Jana Hai	Yes	No	
2010	Noor Bano	Yes	No	
2012	Mehar Bano aur Shah Bano	Yes	No	
2012	New York Se New Karachi	Yes	No	
2012	Yahan Pyar Nahin Hai	Yes	No	
2012	Sitamgar	Yes	No	
2013	Tanhai	Yes	No	
2013	Khoya Khoya Chand	Yes	No	
2013	Ishq Mein Teray	Yes	No	
2014	Kahani Raima Aur Manahil Ki	Yes	No	
2014	Dhol Bajnay Laga	Yes	No	
2014	De Ijazat Jo Tu	Yes	No	
2014	Agar Tum Na Hotay	Yes	No	
2015	Ishq Ibadat	Yes	No	
2015	Zara Si Bhool	No	Yes	
2015	Meray Dil Meray Musafir	No	Yes	
2015	Tumhari Natasha	Yes	No	
2016	Kaisay Tum Se Kahoon	Yes	No	
2016	Dharkan	Yes	No	
2016	Laaj	Yes	No	
2016	Khoobsurat	Yes	Yes	
2017	Kathputli	No	Yes	
2017	Dil-e-Jaanam	Yes	No	
2017	Adhi Gawahi	Yes	Yes	
2017	Khidmat Guzar	Yes	Yes	
2018	Kaisi Aurat Hoon Main	Yes	Yes	
2018	Rashk	No	Yes	
2019	Qismat	Yes	Yes	
2020	Saza e Ishq	Yes	No	
2020	Tum Se Kehna Tha	Yes	Yes	
2021	Bisaat	Yes	Yes	
2023	Honey Moon	Yes	No	
2023	College Gate	Yes	No	
2023	Fatima Feng	Yes	No	
2024	Dil Ka Kya Karein	Yes	No	
2024-25	Iqtidar	Yes	No	
2025	Faaslay	Yes	No	
