= Gunjal =

2023 Pakistani Urdu language film

- گنجل
- Directed by: Shoaib Sultan
- Written by: Nirmal Bano; Ali Kazmi
- Screenplay by: Ali Kazmi
- Story by: Shoaib Sultan
- Based on: Murder of Iqbal Masih
- Produced by: Nighat Akbar Shah
- Starring: Ahmed Ali Akbar; Resham; Amna Ilyas; Ahmad Ali Butt
- Cinematography: Ikram Khan
- Edited by: Mahad Ali Sajid; Sean T Faust
- Music by: Rahat Fateh Ali Khan; Qamar Parvi; Mobeen Zahid; Zonaib Zahid; Xarb
- Production company: Adur Productions Film
- Distributed by: Eveready Pictures
- Release dates: 20 November 2023 (UMT University); 15 December 2023 (Pakistan); (Note: The film was pre launch in UMT University in Lahore only on the occasion of Children's Day but the Official Release for the film in Nationwide and Internationally is 15 December 2023)
- Running time: 137 minutes
- Country: Pakistan
- Languages: Urdu; Punjabi (minor)
- Budget: TBA
- Box office: PKR 2 Crore

Gunjal is a 2023 Pakistani action crime thriller film inspired by the true story of a child labour activist Iqbal Masih, who campaigned against child labour in the 1990s before his murder. The film is directed by Shoaib Sultan, produced by Nighat Akbar Shah and written by Nirmal Bano and Ali Kazmi. Zonaib Zahid and Xarb are the music directors, while the background score is performed by Rahat Fateh Ali Khan, Qamar Parvi, Mobeen Zahid and Zonaib Zahid. It features Ahmed Ali Akbar, Resham, Amna Ilyas and Ahmad Ali Butt in leading roles. The film was released on 15 December 2023.

== Plot ==
The film revolves the journalistic odyssey of Shahbaz Bhatti as he follows the investigation of Iqbal Masih's murder. Iqbal was a child engaged in activism against child labor in the Pakistan of the 1990s.

Bhatti's quest unfurls against the backdrop of a society ensconced in hidden secrets. The story invites viewers into a nuanced exploration of not only the investigative process but also the socio-political milieu that shrouded Iqbal's activism. The narrative trains the light on a society grappling with its own dichotomies.

== Cast ==
- Ahmed Ali Akbar as Shahbaz Bhatti
- Resham as Sarwat Rehman
- Amna Ilyas as Mehar
- Syed Muhammad Ali as Irfan Masih
- Ahmad Ali Butt as Salman Habib
- Razia Malik as Maryam Bibi
- Arham Khan as Iqbal
- Omair Rana as Daily Payam Editor
- Samiya Mumtaz as Najma
- Ali Aftab Saeed as Mazhar
- Fahad Hashmi as Hawaldar
- Ahsen Murad as Arshad
- Habiba Sufyan as Saba
- Munir Khan as Ejaz Ullah
- Syed Tanveer Hussain as Nadeem
- Sardar Nabeel as Pervaiz
- Ebtisam Mustafa as Luqman

== Production ==
=== Development and Filming ===
In April 2023, it was reported that Ahmed Ali Akbar working on an upcoming project which is based on the Social issues of Children's and which is produced by Nighat Akbar Shah. The primary film shooting took place in Lahore and Rural areas of Pakistan.

=== Release ===
Trailer for the film released on 30 September 2023. The film is set to release on 15 December 2023 in Nationwide and Internationally. The film also made a pre-launch event on 20 November 2023 at UMT University, Lahore on the occasion of Children's Day.

== See also ==
- List of Pakistani films of 2023
- List of Pakistani films of 2024
