= Kaisa Yeh Junoon =

Pakistani television series

- Opening title screen
- Genre: Drama
- Written by: Haseena Moin
- Directed by: Raana Shaikh
- Starring: Azfar Rehman; Ayesha Omar; Savera Nadeem; Asif Raza Mir; Adnan Siddiqui; Kirron Kher
- Opening theme: Kaisa Yeh Junoon by Rahat Fateh Ali Khan
- Country of origin: Pakistan
- Original language: Urdu

Original release
- Network: ARY Digital
- Release: 2008

Kaisa Yeh Junoon (English: "What is this obsession?") is a Pakistani television series directed by Raana Sheikh, who also wrote the screenplay with dialogues by Haseena Moin. It first aired in 2008 on ARY Digital and focuses on the subjects of terrorism and religious extremism. The series has Azfar Rehman, Ayesha Omar, Adnan Siddiqui, Madiha Iftikhar, and Savera Nadeem in leading roles.

It received three nominations at the 8th Lux Style Awards, including Best TV Play - Satellite.

== Cast ==
- Madiha Iftikhar as Sana
- Adnan Siddiqui as Anwar Kamal
- Ayesha Omar as Mandy
- Azfar Rehman as Sameer
- Savera Nadeem as Rukhsana
- Saba Hameed
- Asif Raza Mir as Bilal
- Kiron Kher
- Ali Kazmi as Omar
- Hassan Niazi as Aamir
- Farah Nadeem as Attiya
- Laila Wasti as Mehreen

== Production ==
According to director Raana Sheikh, she was first asked to direct the series in the Indian style, with over-the-top and exaggerated production. The series marked the acting debut of Rehman and his first appearance with Omar, the others being Roza Kay Rozy, Miss U Kabhi Kabhi, and Bisaat. The series marked the appearance of Bollywood actress Kiron Kher, who played the supporting role in the series in her first Pakistani TV drama.

The series was shot in London, Bombay, and Karachi.

== Accolades ==
Ceremony	Category	Recipient	Result
8th Lux Style Awards	Best TV Play (Satellite)	Kaisa Yeh Junoon	Nominated
8th Lux Style Awards	Best TV Actor (Satellite)	Azfar Rehman	Nominated
8th Lux Style Awards	Best TV Actress	Ayesha Omer	Nominated
