= Aisi Hai Tanhai =

2017 Pakistani television series

- Title Card for Aisi Hai Tanhai
- Genre: Tragedy; Romance film
- Written by: Mohsin Ali
- Directed by: Badar Mehmood
- Starring: Sami Khan; Sonya Hussain
- Theme music composer: Waqar Ali
- Opening theme: "Aisi Hai Tanhai" by Rahat Fateh Ali Khan
- Country of origin: Pakistan
- Original language: Urdu
- No. of seasons: 1
- No. of episodes: 33

Production
- Camera setup: Multi-camera setup

Original release
- Network: ARY Digital
- Release: 8 November 2017 – 21 March 2018

Aisi Hai Tanhai (Urdu: ایسی ہے تنہائی, lit. 'Such is Loneliness') is a Pakistani television serial that originally aired on ARY Digital Network on 8 November 2017 and ended on 21 March 2018. It is written by Mohsin Ali, produced by Fahad Mustafa, and Dr. Ali Kazmi, and directed by Badar Mehmood. In this serial, Sami Khan has played the lead role, which was based on a love story with Sonya Hussain and Nadia Khan. Aisi Hai Tanhai talks about how social media can become a curse for someone's life and destroy everything.

== Plot ==
Pakeeza (Sonya Hussain) is a college student who lives with her widowed mother Khadija (Saba Hameed) and older sister Kinza (Nadia Khan). She falls in love with her classmate Hamza (Sami Khan) and soon they are engaged. Meanwhile, Kinza is married into a respectable family. One day, Hamza challenges Pakeeza to prove the love and trust she has for him. She takes bold pictures on her phone, and the next day she offers Hamza to take a look. He feels ashamed and denies the offer. Immediately afterwards, some goons snatch Pakeeza's phone and shoot her in the process. Hamza rushes her to the hospital, where she recovers fully but expresses concern over the contents of her phone.

The goons leak Pakeeza's photos all over social media, where they go viral. Hamza's friends hold him responsible for this and Hamza goes to lengths to ensure that Pakeeza's family remains oblivious. His close friend Ramsha is in love with him and feels jealous of his relationship with Pakeeza. To sabotage their engagement, she forwards Pakeeza's photos to Hamza's mother. This causes Hamza's parents to break off their son's engagement. Pakeeza's family learns the truth about her viral photos when Kinza's husband divorces her. In retaliation, Khadija poisons Pakeeza. As Pakeeza is admitted to the hospital in critical condition, Khadija leaves and informs everyone that Pakeeza committed suicide. This devastates Kinza and Hamza, while Ramsha feels guilty for the betrayal. Pakeeza is shifted to another ward in the meantime, where Dr. Saad (Kamran Jilani) takes interest in her case and takes it upon himself to try and heal her. When Khadija returns to the hospital, she is told that there is a deceased patient in the ward Pakeeza had been in, causing her to believe that Pakeeza is dead.

While she is in a coma, Pakeeza is raped by a hospital custodian and this goes unnoticed by the rest of the staff. She eventually awakens, much to Dr. Saad's delight, and begins to recover slowly. In the meantime, Hamza marries Kinza as he feels responsible for ruining Pakeeza and her family's reputation. Dr. Saad offers Pakeeza shelter in his home after she is discharged and learns that she is pregnant. The hospital custodian is arrested, while Pakeeza is distraught over the trauma she has faced. Dr. Saad begins to receive threats for helping her and to protect him, she leaves to stay in a women's shelter. There she is shunned once it is discovered that she is pregnant. Now homeless, Pakeeza travels to a local shrine and suffers a bad fall. Ramsha, who had been volunteering at the shrine, sees this and is shocked to know that Pakeeza is alive. She takes her to a hospital, where Pakeeza is told that she has had a miscarriage. While Ramsha takes care of Pakeeza at her own home, Dr. Saad works hard to take the custodian to court. He urges Pakeeza to provide testimony so that justice can be served. Khadija receives a notice to appear in court, where she is shocked to find Pakeeza alive. Kinza and Hamza are also surprised to learn of Pakeeza's rape case. During the trial, the prosecutor questions Pakeeza's character and discusses her leaked photos. After Khadija and Ramsha admit their wrongdoings in court, this further traumatizes Pakeeza. She confronts her mother and Hamza, questioning their actions. Khadija passes away the next morning after wallowing in guilt. Soon after this, Hamza is shot and dies in the hospital as Pakeeza weeps beside him. The court finds the custodian guilty after he confesses his crime and is sentenced to jail. Pakeeza forgives Ramsha and moves in with her. She opens up a self-defense school for young girls, promising to fight for their rights.

== Cast ==
- Sonya Hussain as Pakeeza Islam
- Sami Khan as Hamza
- Nadia Khan as Kinza
- Sadia Ghaffar as Ramsha
- Saba Hameed as Khadija Islam
- Shehryar Zaidi as Hamza's father
- Seemi Pasha as Hamza's mother
- Kamran Jilani as Dr. Saad
- Fazila Qazi as Dr. Saad's sister

== Soundtrack ==
Aisi Hai Tanhai

Soundtrack album by Rahat Fateh Ali Khan
- Genre: Theme song
- Length: 2:43
- Language: Urdu
- Producer: BIG BANG Entertainment

Track list
No.	Title	Singer(s)	Length
1.	"Aisi Hai Tanhai"	Rahat Fateh Ali Khan	2:43

== International broadcast ==
The serial was dubbed in Arabic and was broadcast under the title Karamati (کرامتی) on MBC Bollywood across Arab World and North Africa.

== Awards and nominations ==
Date of ceremony	Award	Category	Recipient(s) and nominee(s)	Result	References
2019	ARY Digital- Social Media Drama Awards 2018	Best Drama Serial -2018	Aisi Hai Tanhai	Nominated	
2019	ARY Digital- Social Media Drama Awards 2018	Best Actor Male (Serial)	Sami Khan	Nominated	
2019	ARY Digital- Social Media Drama Awards 2018	Best Actor Female (Serial)	Sonya Hussyn	Nominated	
2019	ARY Digital- Social Media Drama Awards 2018	Best Supporting Actor (Male)	Kamran Jilani	Nominated	
2019	ARY Digital- Social Media Drama Awards 2018	Best Supporting Actor (Female)	Nadia Khan	Nominated	
2019	ARY Digital- Social Media Drama Awards 2018	Best OST	Rahat Fateh Ali Khan	Nominated	
2019	ARY Digital- Social Media Drama Awards 2018	Best Couple	Sami Khan and Sonya Hussyn	Nominated	
2019	ARY Digital- Social Media Drama Awards 2018	Best Director	Badar Mehmood	Nominated	
2019	ARY Digital- Social Media Drama Awards 2018	Best Script Writer	Mohsin Ali	Nominated	
2019	Lux Style Awards	Best TV Play	Aisi Hai Tanhai	Nominated	
2019	Lux Style Awards	Best TV Actress (Critic's choice)	Sonya Hussyn	Nominated	
2019	Lux Style Awards	Best TV Actress (Viewer's choice)	Sonya Hussyn	Nominated	
