= Adla Khan =

Pakistani actress

- Born: Lahore, Pakistan
- Occupation: Actress
- Years active: 2012 – present

Adla Khan is a Pakistani actress. She is known for her roles in dramas such as Kaisi Aurat Hoon Main, Kasak Rahay Ge, Baba Jani, Tera Yahan Koi Nahin, Inteqam and Fitrat.

== Early life ==
Adla was born in Lahore, Pakistan.

== Career ==
Adla made her acting debut in 2012 on PTV and appeared in PTV dramas. She was noted for her roles in dramas Koi Meray Dil Say Pouchay, Saheliyaan, Maya, Mahi Ray and Miss You Kabhi Kabhi. She also appeared in dramas Tumhari Natasha, Ishqaaway, Thori Si Wafa, Kaisi Aurat Hoon Main and Dil Muhallay Ki Haveli. Since then she has appeared in dramas Kasak Rahay Ge, Zakham, Baba Jani, Tera Yahan Koi Nahin and Fitrat.

== Filmography ==
=== Television ===
Year	Title	Role	Network	Refs
2012	Koi Meray Dil Say Pouchay	Raheen	PTV	
2012	Maya	Sumbul	ARY Digital	
2013	Hum Sub Umeed Se Hain	Morning show host	Geo TV	
2013	Dil Muhallay Ki Haveli	Rabia	Geo TV	
2015	Mahi Ray	Nousha	PTV	
2015	Ishqaaway	Mahnoor	Geo Entertainment	
2015	Miss You Kabhi Kabhi	Aiza	Hum Sitaray	
2015	Tumhari Natasha	Sumbul	Hum TV	
2016	Saheliyaan	Kushbakht	ARY Digital	
2017	Thori Si Wafa	Beena	Hum TV	
2017	Zakham	Mehwish	ARY Digital	
2018; 2020	Mazaaq Raat	Herself	Dunya News	
2018	Kaisi Aurat Hoon Main	Amal	Hum TV	
2018	Kasak Rahay Ge	Emaan	TV One	
2018	Baba Jani	Nabeela	Geo Entertainment	
2019	Dolly Darling	Mansooba	Geo Entertainment	
2019	Tera Yahan Koi Nahin	Ghazala	Hum TV	
2019–2022	Makafaat	Alizeh (Season 1), Savera (Season 2), Saira (Season 3), Nazi (Season 4)	Geo Entertainment	
2020	Fitrat	Maliha	Geo Entertainment	
2020–2023	Dikhawa	Malika (Season 1), Naheed (Season 2), Fajar (Season 3), Nadia (Season 4)	Geo Entertainment	
2021	Dour	Yasmeen	Geo Entertainment	
2022	Inteqam	Seema	Geo TV	
2022	Kaala Doriya	Nida	Hum TV	
