= Shamil Khan =

Pakistani actor (born 1978)

- Born: Mohammad Shamyl Bakht Khan; 17 March 1978 (age 48); Islamabad, Pakistan
- Other name: Shamyl Khan
- Occupation: Actor
- Years active: 2003 – Present

Shamil Khan (Urdu: شامل خان; also known as Shamyl; born March 1978 in Islamabad) is a Pakistani film and television actor.

He is best known for his film debut in Larki Punjaban (2003).

He also appeared in the Hum TV serial Sadqay Tumhare (2014)

Shamil Khan was appointed as a CLF Goodwill Ambassador by the Children's Literature Festival on July 30, 2019.

== Early life and family ==
Shamil's father Jahangir Khan (1926-2013) was a journalist, a bureaucrat and also an actor who appeared in Pakistan's first movie, Teri Yaad (1948), in a lead role.

Shamil has three sisters and three brothers.

== Career ==
Shamil was in Lahore for basant when he met famous director Syed Noor, who convinced him to take on acting and also taught him other skills related to the field such as direction, cinematography, production, editing and scriptwriting, also giving him his break with Larki Punjaban in 2003.

He has since then appeared in numerous films and television plays.

== Filmography ==
=== Films ===
Year	Title	Role	Language	Notes
2003	Larki Punjaban		Urdu	Acting debut
2004	Hum Ek Hain		Urdu	
2006	Jism		Urdu	
2008	Basanti		Urdu	
2008	Gulabo		Urdu	
2008	Kabhi Pyar Na Karna		Urdu	
2011	Son of Pakistan		Urdu	
2016	Revenge of the Worthless	Arbaz Khan	Urdu	
2023	Aar Paar	Kamal Ahsan	Punjabi	
2025	Qulfee	Ghulab Chatri (GC)	Urdu	Main antagonist

=== Television serials ===
Year	Title	Role	Channel
2004	Saiban Sheeshay Ka	Abdul	PTV Home
2006	Kharidar		PTV Home
2006	Dobara		PTV Home
2007	Khuda Gawah	Abdullah	ATV
2010	Roger		PTV
2010	Lahore Junction		PTV
2010	Kalmoohi	Shayaan (Shani)	PTV
2010	Husn Ara Kaun		TV One
2011	Binte Adam		PTV Home
2011	Nazar		PTV Home
2013	Anjanay Nagar	Shezar	TV One
2013	Love, Life Aur Lahore		A-Plus
2014	Chahat	Mir Danyal	PTV Home
2014	Sadqay Tumhare	Dr. Maqsood	Hum TV
2015	Akeli	Azfar	Hum TV
2015	Tere Baghair	Arslan	Hum TV
2015	Ishq-e-Benaam	Kesar	Hum TV
2015	Maana Ka Gharana	Malik	Hum TV
2016	Bad Gumaan	Salman	Hum TV
2017	Phir Wohi Mohabbat	Yasir	Hum TV
2017	Yaqeen Ka Safar	Dr. Shehroze	Hum TV
2017	Thori Si Wafa	Akhtar	Hum TV
2017	Mera Haq	Umair	Geo TV
2018	Seep	Waqas	TV One
2018	Tajdeed e Wafa	Cameo appearance	Hum TV
2019	Anaa	Ghazanfar	Hum TV
2019	Bharam	Burhan	Hum TV
2019	Log Kia Kahengay	Feroze	Hum TV
2022	Sang-e-Mah	Dr. Haider	Hum TV
2023	Nauroz	Darvesh Khan	Green Entertainment
2024	Jafaa	Saleem	Hum TV
2024	Duniyapur	Zamir	Green Entertainment
2025	Bajjo	Jawad	Geo Entertainment
2025	Dayan	Javed	Geo Entertainment
2026	Jahannum Ba'raasta Jannat	Salaar Khan	Green Entertainment
2026	Aik Mohabbat Aur	Chaudhry	Green Entertainment
2026	Muhafiz	Nadeem	Geo Entertainment

== Awards and nomination ==
Year	Ceremony	Category	Project	Result
2004	3rd Lux Style Awards	Best Film Actor	Larki Punjaban	Nominated
2017	5th Hum Awards	Best Soap Actor	Bad Gumaan	Nominated
