= 8th Lux Style Awards =

Pakistani film awards ceremony

- Date: 12 September 2009
- Site: Expo Centre, Karachi
- Hosted by: Ahsan Khan and Sana Nawaz

Television coverage
- Channel: ARY Digital

The 8th Lux Style Awards ceremony was held in Expo Center in Karachi, Pakistan. The show was hosted by Ahsan Khan, Sana Nawaz and from the members of BNN. The 8th Lux Style Awards ceremony was to be held at Karachi Expo Center but due to unstable political conditions, the ceremony was postponed instead winners were announced and photographed at the Red Carpet. Some of the film and music categories were removed from the award.

== Films ==
Category	Winner	Nominations
Best Film	Ramchand Pakistani	Zill-e-Shah; Gulabo
Best Film Actor	Shaan Shahid-Zill-e-Shah	Syed Fazal Hussain-Ramchand Pakistani; Rashid Farooqi-Ramchand Pakistani
Best Film Actress	Maria Wasti-Ramchand Pakistani	Nandita Das-Ramchand Pakistani; Saima Noor-Zill-e-Shah

== Television ==
Category	Winner	Nominations
Best Television Play (Terrestrial)	Thora Sa Asman-PTV	Nautankee-ATV; Dasht Aashna-PTV; Kabhi Aye Na Judai-ATV; Mussafat-PTV
Best Television Director (Terrestrial)	Shah Bilal-Nautankee (ATV)	Fahim Burney-Kabhi Aye Na Judai (ATV); Kazim Pasha-Thora Sa Asman (PTV); Syed Atif Hussain-Kaisay Aye Karar (ATV); Ali Rizvi-Dasht Aashna (PTV)
Best Television Actor (Terrestrial)	Talat Hussain-Kabhi Aye Na Judai (PTV)	Arbaaz Khan-Kanch Kay Jugnoo (ATV); Habib-Nautankee (ATV); Fahad Mustafa-Kaise Aye Karar (ATV); Noman Ijaz-Mussafat (PTV)
Best Television Actress (Terrestrial)	Saima Noor-Nautankee (ATV)	Naheed Shabbir-Kanch Kay Jugnoo (ATV); Aliya Imam Thora Sa Asman (PTV); Erum Akhtar-Kabhi Aye Na Judai (ATV); Mehreen Raheel-Kabhi Aye Na Judai (ATV)
Best Television Play (Satellite)	Khamoshiyan-Hum TV	Kaisa Yeh Junoon-ARY Digital; Sarkar Sahab-ARY Digital; Muthi Bhar Chaawal-TV One; Jhumka Jan-Hum TV
Best Television Director (Satellite)	Babar Javed-Jhumka Jan (Hum TV)	Babar Javed-Manay Na Ye Dil (Hum TV); Babar Javed-Khamoshiyan (Hum TV); Barkat Siddiqui-Gatt Jor (TV One); Kamran Qureshi-Sarkar Sahab (ARY Digital)
Best Television Actor (Satellite)	Nauman Ijaz-Khamoshiyan (Hum TV)	Faysal Quraishi-Manay Na Ye Dil (Hum TV); Azfar Rehman-Kaisa Yeh Junoon (ARY Digital); Asif Raza Mir-Sarkar Sahab (ARY Digital); Faisal Rehman-Khamoshiyan (Hum TV)
Best Television Actress (Satellite)	Sania Saeed-Jhumka Jan (Hum TV)	Ayesha Omer-Kaisa Yeh Junoon (ARY Digital); Sonia Rehman-Mohabat Karne Walon Ke Nam (Hum TV); Savera Nadeem-Milay Kuch Yun (ARY Digital); Resham-Muthi Bhar Chaawal (TV One)

== Music ==
Category	Winner	Nominations
Best Song of the Year	Khabon Ke Rishtey-Najam Sheraz	Laga Reh-Shehzad Roy; Gallan-Ali Azmat; Aitebar-Zeb Bangash & Hania Aslam; Khaireyan De Nal-Shafqat Amanat Ali
Best Album of the Year	Qismat Apney Haath Mein-Shehzad Roy	Chup-Zeb Bangash & Haniya Aslam; Koi Aanay Wala Hai-Strings; Klashinfolk-Ali Azmat; Tabeer-Shafqat Amanat Ali
Best Video Director	Ahsan Rahim-Laga Reh	Zeeshan Parwez-Gallan; Jami-Jago; Saqib Malik-Aitebar; Jalal & Amir-Aisi Tesi
Best Music Director	Faisal Rafi & Rohail Hayat-Charkha	Mekaal Hasan Band-Chup; Zeeshan Haider-Qismat Apney Haath Mein

== Fashion ==
Ceremony	Winners	Nominations
Best Model of the Year (female)	Nadia Hussain	Fayeza Ansari; Neha Ahmed; Nooray Bhatty; Rabia Butt
Best Model of the Year (male)	Ameer Zeb Khan	Abdullah Khan; Arsalan; Iftikhar Zafar; Rizwan Ali
Best Fashion Photographer/Videographer	Khawar Riaz	Arif Mehmood; Rizwan Baig; Guddu Shani; Rizwan-ul-Haq
Best Fashion Makeup & Hair Artist	Akif Ilyas	Guddu Shani; Khawar Riaz; Munazza Rizwan; Tariq Amin
Best Emerging Talent in Fashion	Aamina Sheikh	Adnan Pardesy; Fahad Hussain; Fayyaz Ahmed; Nisha Butt
Best Retail Brand	Generation	Crossroads; Ego; Fnk Asia; Stoneage
Best Achievement in Fashion Design (Prét)	Iman Ahmed at Body Focus	Maheen Karim; Sadaf Malaterre; Sara Shahid at Sublime; Sonya Battla
Best Achievement in Fashion Design (Couture)	Sana Safinaz	Bunto Kazmi; Kamiar Rokni; Rizwan Baig; Umar Sayee
Best Achievement in Fashion Design (Menswear)	Ismail Farid	Amir Adnan; Deepak Perwani; Kuki Concepts; Munib Nawaz
