= Swaarangi =

- Theatrical release poster
- Directed by: Phida Hussain
- Written by: Phida Hussain
- Produced by: Mazhar Abbas
- Starring: Resham; Ayub Khoso; Naveed Akbar; Waseem Manzoor; Hamza Mushtaq; Shahzaib Johar
- Cinematography: Phida Hussain
- Edited by: Phida Hussain
- Music by: Sahir Ali Bagga
- Production companies: Flipping Images Productions; Phidahussain Productions
- Distributed by: Footprint Entertainment
- Release date: 11 September 2015
- Running time: 106 minutes
- Country: Pakistan
- Language: Urdu

Swaarangi (Urdu: سوارنگی) is a 2015 Pakistani crime drama film directed by Phida Hussain and produced by Mazhar Abbas under the production banner of Flipping Images Productions and Phida Hussain Productions. The film stars Resham, Ayub Khoso, Naveed Akbar, Waseem Manzoor, Hamza Mushtaq and Shahzaib Johar in lead roles.

The film was released by Footprint Entertainment on 11 September 2015 on limited screens in Pakistan.

== Synopsis ==
Salma's husband, Jamal is not the easiest man to get along with, but for the sake of their children, she stays with him. Jamal is a heroin addict, dependent on Salma's instincts to protect her wedding vows so he can take advantage of her honorability to get his daily fix. He is lost without her, desperate to change however willing to sell his soul to the devil if need be. Although Salma is powerless to change his sick ways but she has to stand against the odds and struggle for everything she got. Zaryaab is the man who controls the illegal activities of the area. He is fully supported by the powerful syndicate head Saien. Swaarangi is an intertwined story about life, fate, sacrifice and survival.

== Cast ==
- Resham as Salma
- Ayub Khoso as Saieen
- Hamza Mushtaq as Asad
- Waseem Manzoor as Zaryaab
- Zulfiqar Gullshahi as Inspector Akbar
- Naveed Akbar as Jamal
- Shahzaib Johar as Haris
- Aftab Nisar as Nawaz
- Hasnain as Saieen assistant
- Rehman Saieen's assistant

== Music ==
The music of the film is composed by Sahir Ali Bagga and Mujtaba Ali Choni.

== Release ==
Earlier, the film was scheduled to release on 28 August 2015 but was delayed for a later release on 11 September.

== See also ==
- List of directorial debuts
- List of Pakistani films of 2015
