= 3rd Lux Style Awards =

2004 Pakistani awards ceremony

- Date: 14 March 2004
- Site: Sheikh Zyed hall, Dubai
- Hosted by: Arbaaz Khan and Zara Sheikh

Highlights
- Best Film: Larki Panjaban

Television coverage
- Channel: ARY Digital

The 3rd Lux Style Awards ceremony was held in Dubai, United Arab Emirates. The show was hosted by Humayun Saeed, Zara Sheikh and from the members of BNN. The show had the performances by Iman Ali and Reema Khan, Sana Nawaz, Veena Malik, Meera, Saba Qamar and Mikaal Zulfiqar etc. Some of the film and music categories were removed from the award.

Most nominations in Television categories were received by serial Mehndi. It won all the categories in which it was nominated. Larki Punjaban led most nominations and awards in Film categories. PTV led most nominations and winning three.

== Film ==
Category	Winners	Nominations
Best Film Director	Syed Noor-Larki Panjaban	Syed Noor-Commando; Rauf Khalid-Laaj; Fahim Burney-Pyar Hi Pyar Mein; Sangeeta-Yeh Wada Raha
Best Film Actor	Shaan Shahid-Commando	Babar Ali-Larki Panjaban; Shamil Khan-Larki Panjaban; Ashaal-Pyar Hi Pyar Mein; Talat Hussain-Laaj
Best Film Actress	Zara Sheikh-Laaj	Resham-Laaj; Saima Noor-Larki Panjaban; Saima Noor-Commando; Meera-Commando

== Television ==
Category	Winner	Nominations
Best Television Play	Mehndi-PTV	Seeli Baarish-Geo TV; Harjaee-Indus Vision; Thori Si Mohabbat-Geo TV; Ambulance-Indus Vision
Best Television Actor	Humayun Saeed-Mehndi (PTV)	Faysal Quraishi-Umrao Jaan Ada (TV series) (Geo TV); Faysal Quraishi-Harjaee (Indus Vision); Abid Ali-Mehndi (PTV); Sajid Hasan-Ishq Aatish (Geo TV)
Best Television Actress	Aaminah Haq-Mehndi (PTV)	Sonia Rehman-Ambulance (Indus Vision); Sania Saeed-Thori Si Mohabbat (Geo TV); Savera Nadeem-Ibn Adam (ARY Digital); Bushra Ansari-Umrao Jaan Ada (TV series) (Geo TV)

== Music ==
Category	Winner	Nominations
Best Album of the Year	Huqa Pani-Ali Zafar	Dhaani-Strings; Sub to Sohniye-Faakhir Mehmood; Yeh Moaomla Koi Aur Hai-Najam Sheraz; Parastish-Ahmed Jahanzeb
Best Video Director	Shoaib Mansoor-Anarkali	Sohail Javed-Jogi; Ghazali Farooqui-Janbaaz; Jami-Chaaye Chaaye; Jami-Akhiyaan

== Special ==
Category	Winner
Chairperson's Lifetime Achievement Award (Male)	Muhammad Ali
Chairperson's Lifetime Achievement Award (Female)	Zeba
