= Anum Fayyaz =

Pakistani television actress

- Born: 25 December 1991 (age 34); Karachi, Pakistan
- Education: Govt Degree College For Women
- Occupations: Actress; Model
- Years active: 2006 – 2023
- Spouse: Asad Anwar (m. 2016)
- Children: 1

Anum Fayyaz (Urdu: انم فیاض) is a Pakistani former television actress and model. She is known for acting in dramas such as Ahmed Habib Ki Betiyan, Meri Maa, Ishq Ibadat, and Parvarish.

== Personal life ==
She married Asad Anwar on 25 November 2016 in Makkah. They have one child.

Anum later took to social media to announce her retirement from the entertainment industry. She posted a message calling her decision 'difficult.' "I have decided to leave the industry and want to focus on my family," the post rea. She thanked her fans for their support.

== Filmography ==
Key
†	Denotes film / drama that has not been released yet
†	Denotes films / dramas that are currently in cinema / on air

=== Television serials ===
Year	Title	Role	Network
2011	Extras: The Mango People	Hira	Hum TV
2011	Ahmad Habib Ki Baitiyan	Aiza	Hum TV
2012	Zard Mausam	Birjees	Hum TV
2012	Mar Jain Bhi To Kya	Zareen	Hum TV
2012	Bilqees Kaur	Seemi	Hum TV
2013	Mein Hari Piya	Taalia	Hum TV
2013	Saari Bhool Hamari Thi	Maryam	Hum TV
2013	Meri Maa	Rameen	Geo Entertainment
2014	Rukhsati	Masooma	Geo Entertainment
2014	Ghar Aik Jannat	Maham	Geo Kahani
2014	Pachtawa	Saman	ARY Digital
2014	Parvarish	Noor-ul-Ain	ARY Digital
2015	Zara Si Bhool	Taskeen	TV One
2015	Ishq Ibadat	Rano	Hum TV
2015	Mera Yahan Koi Nahi	Sofia	Geo Entertainment
2015	Dil Tere Naam	Manahil	Urdu 1
2016	Mein Sitara	Falak	TV One
2016	Intezaar	Saba	A-Plus TV
2016	Muntazir	Ayesha	Play Entertainment
2016	Yeh Chahatein Yeh Shiddatein	Navera	Geo Entertainment
2016	Faltu Larki	Erum	A-Plus TV
2017	Tishnagi Dil Ki	Tabaan	Geo Entertainment
2017	Jaltay Gulab	Roshni	TV One
2017	Mohabbat Mushkil Hai	Uroosa	Hum TV
2017	Jannat	Zara	A-Plus TV
2017	Kabhi Socha Na Tha	Dil Nasheen	Geo Entertainment
2017	Aadat	Sana	TV One
2018	Mera Khuda Jane	Iqra	Geo Entertainment
2018	Tum Se Hi Talluq Hai	Naina	Geo Entertainment
2018	Band Khirkiyan	Midhat	Hum TV
2018	Mohabbat Dard Bunti Hai	Aliha	PTV Home
2019	Makafaat Season 1	Maryam	Geo Entertainment
2020	Aye Mohabbat	Rameen	TV One
2021	Makafaat Season 3	Areeba	Geo TV
2022	Beqadar	Mahrukh	Hum TV
2022	Makafaat Season 4	Zoya	Geo Entertainment
2022	Dikhawa Season 3	Nirma	Geo Entertainment

=== Telefilm ===
Year	Title	Role
2012	Usha	Mala
2014	Subah Be Daagh Hai	Natasha
2016	Desi Girl Videshi Babu	Faiza
2018	Teri Nazar	Sara
2018	Maro Goli	Sadia

=== Film ===
Year	Title	Role
2011	Tasveer Ka Aik Rukhh	Doctor Ji
2021	Dil Se	Zara

== See also ==
- List of Pakistani actresses
