= Tumhari Natasha =

Television series

- Written by: Farida Masroor; Adison
- Directed by: Fahim Burney
- Starring: Sohai Ali Abro; Azfar Rehman
- Theme music composer: Sohail Haider
- Opening theme: "Tumhari Natasha"; Singer(s); Basit Ali & Bushra Bilal
- Country of origin: Pakistan
- Original language: Urdu
- No. of episodes: 20

Production
- Producer: Hammad Abbas
- Running time: 30–45 minutes
- Production company: AnF Production

Original release
- Network: Hum TV
- Release: 24 July – 11 December 2015

Tumhari Natasha (English:Your Natasha) is a 2015 Pakistani romantic drama serial aired on Hum TV. The series is directed by Fahim Burney and produced by Hammad Abbas. The show aired every Friday at 9:10 pm from 24 July to 11 December 2015.

== Plot ==
The Series spins around the fundamental lead Natasha, the little girl of an effective businessman, Afnan Adil and Dur-e-Shahwar. Conceived with a silver spoon in her mouth, Natasha has every one of the enhancements one could wish for in their life, yet the one thing she wishes the most for is a life of bliss and love with her parents, which is absent as they are regularly inconsistent with each other. Natasha venerates her companion Sumbal's parents, Farooq Sahib and Shahnaz Begum, who are an impeccable photo of a glad couple and who have made their home a shelter of affection, care, and mutual respect. The story takes an energizing turn when the pressure between her parents develops and they choose to split up. Natasha needs to pick between her parents, however, she would rather leave on an arrangement that may spare her from making a decision. The series then shows how Natasha's arrangement works, leading her to much further dissatisfaction.

== Cast ==
- Sohai Ali Abro as Natasha
- Azfar Rehman as Ahmer
- Farhan Ahmed Malhi as Kaif
- Saba Hameed as Natasha's mother
- Adla Khan as Sumbul
- Waseem Abbas as Natasha's father
- Asma Abbas as Ahmer's Mother
- Qazi Wajid
- Tariq Jamil
- Asad Mahmood
