= Larki Punjaban =

2003 film

- Directed by: Syed Noor
- Written by: Rukhsana Noor
- Produced by: Afzal M. Khan
- Starring: Babar Ali; Shamil Khan; Saima
- Cinematography: Waqar Bukhari
- Music by: Zain
- Distributed by: Paragon Entertainment
- Release date: 25 December 2003
- Country: Pakistan
- Language: Urdu

Larki Punjaban (Urdu: لڑکی پنجابن; lit. Punjabi Girl) is a 2003 Pakistani Urdu film directed by Syed Noor and starring Babar Ali, Saima, and Shamyl Khan.

== Plot ==
A simple, love story between a Sikh girl (Saima) and a Muslim boy (Shamyl Khan).

In August 1947, both Pakistan and India got their independence. Partition lines were drawn on the map of the British Raj, dividing not only the subcontinent but also provinces, particularly Punjab. The results of the partition were catastrophic. All in the name of religion and nationalism, people who had lived together in harmony for centuries committed mindless acts of violence against each other, resulting in over one million deaths that including Sikhs, Muslims and Hindus. An estimated 75,000 women were raped and over twelve million people were uprooted. Hindus and Sikhs migrated to India and Muslims to Pakistan.

During these troubled times, a select few did not give in to the acts of barbarism. One such person was a young Muslim man who refused to participate in the fires of hate and destruction burning around him. During the hostilities, he found a young Sikh girl separated from her family. Risking the anger of the mobs, he brought her home and offered her sanctuary. As the fires of hate began to burn out, families came to terms with losing loved ones on both sides. Those who could not be found were presumed dead. The young girl was touched by how the boy protected her against the ruthless mobs, risking his own life. Eventually, they fell in love. She converted to Islam and they married.

Years later, this girl becomes a dying grandmother herself and her last wish is to meet her family, back in India. After enquiring, she discovered that her family had migrated to Chandigarh, India.

Knowing her family would disown her if they discovered that she had converted to Islam, she contacts her sister, pretending to be a long lost Muslim friend and invited her and her family to come to Lahore for a religious pilgrimage to 'Nankana Sahib' a highly revered Sikh Temple, where thousands of Sikhs travel to visit it every year.

The Sikh family comes to Lahore where the two sisters live together as friends, not knowing about their real relationship as sisters. During their stay with the Muslim family, history began to repeat itself. Preetam, the daughter of the Sikh family, started to get friendly with Shamil Khan, the son of a Muslim family. When the Sikh family discovers that a relationship is blossoming, they quickly return to Chandigarh. However, the young couple keeps in touch on the telephone and the Internet, and their love grows stronger.

Preetam's family, realizing the potential problems, sends her off to Malaysia to marry her fiancé. Shamil is heart broken at suddenly losing contact with Preetam. Shamil's family, watching his despair, persuaded him to travel to Malaysia to complete his education.

As fate would have it, Shamil sees Preetam in Kuala Lumpur, only a few days before she is due to marry. What can they do? Run away together and face the wrath of their families? Or accept the decision of their elders and sacrifice their love for each other? Can their love and cultural barriers survive the pressures of culture, tradition, inbred hatred and religion of their elders? As in fables, will love to conquer all, or will the harsh realities of life suffocate the young lovers into submission?

== Film business ==
The film did an average amount of business at the box office.

== Cast ==
- Babar Ali
- Saima
- Shamyl Khan
- Rashid Mehmood
- Rasheed Naz
- Tariq Shah
- Azhar Rangeela
- Bahar Begum
- Naghma Begum
- Habib

== Awards and recognition ==
Ceremony	Category	Recipient	Result
3rd Lux Style Awards	Best Film Director	Syed Noor	Won
3rd Lux Style Awards	Best Film Actor	Babar Ali	Nominated
3rd Lux Style Awards	Best Film Actor	Shamil Khan	Nominated
3rd Lux Style Awards	Best Film Actress	Saima Noor	Nominated
