= Kaisi Aurat Hoon Main =

Television series

- کیسی عورت ہوں میں
- Genre: Legal drama; Mystery; Romance; Thriller film
- Written by: Saima Akram Chudhery
- Directed by: Fahim Burney
- Starring: Nadia Khan; Faisal Rehman
- Theme music composer: Wali Hamid Ali Khan
- Opening theme: "Ranjishein Sahi" by Hamid Ali Khan
- Country of origin: Pakistan
- Original language: Urdu
- No. of seasons: 1
- No. of episodes: 25

Production
- Executive producer: Momina Duraid
- Producers: Mukhtar Ahmad Chohan; Hammad Abbas
- Camera setup: Single-camera setup
- Running time: 35~40 minutes
- Production companies: A&F Production

Original release
- Network: Hum TV
- Release: 2 May – 24 October 2018

Kaisi Aurat Hoon Main (lit. 'What type of woman am I?'), previously titled Kaisi Aurat Ho Tum is a Pakistani drama serial, which was first aired on 2 May 2018 on Hum TV replacing Dar Si Jaati Hai Sila. It stars Nadia Khan and Faisal Rehman.

The drama focuses on struggles of women in society, and tells the story of a popular celebrity chef whose success threatens her chauvinist husband. It is directed by Fahim Burney and written by Saima Akram Chudhery.

== Plot ==
Maham and Moiz fall for each other in their high school and decide to be together forever. They overcome all obstacles to tie the knot, but their happily-ever-after is short-lived. Moiz soon starts neglecting his duties as a husband and father. Maham takes matters into her own hands, pursuing a career as a TV chef. However, her rising star sparks Moiz's jealousy, leading him to unleash a barrage of emotional abuse that threatens to destroy Maham's sense of self.

== Cast ==
- Nadia Khan as Maham Moiz
- Faisal Rehman as Moiz
- Ali Josh as Taimoor
- Saniya Shamshad as Savera
- Adla Khan as Amal
- Arslan Rafiq Mughal as Jawad
- Mareeha Safdar as Beenish (Biya)
- Daniyal Arshad as Danish
- Marium Shafi as Maham's mother
- Ruhi Bano as Moiz's mother
- Sana Butt
- Hammad Abbas
- Umair Rafique
- Saba Shahid
- Saima Butt
- Shamma Arif
- Kamran Sheikh
- Maria Malik as Rania
- Moosa as Ayan
- Banita as Isma

=== Guest appearances ===
- Uzma Khan as Sara Hamdan
- Saim Ali as Ahmed Shuja
- Wali Hamid Ali Khan as Haider

== Production ==
The concept of the series was presented by the director Fahim Burney, which initially centered around the story of a morning show host who faces emotional abuse from her husband. However, the team modified the story to avoid potential controversy, changing the protagonist's profession from a morning show host to a cooking show host. Following this adjustment, the writer Saima Akram Chaudhry took charge of developing the characters and the storyline, bringing the series to life.

The series was previously titled Kaisi Aurat Ho Tum.
