= Tera Yahan Koi Nahin =

Pakistani television series by Momina Duraid

- Official title card
- تیرا یہاں کوئی نہیں
- Genre: Drama
- Written by: Farhad Qaimkhani
- Directed by: Haseeb Ali
- Starring: Kinza Hashmi; Asad Siddiqui; Nadia Hussain; Savera Nadeem; Anam Tanveer; Adla Khan; Farhan Ali Agha; Ahmad Harhash
- Country of origin: Pakistan
- Original language: Urdu
- No. of episodes: 39

Production
- Producer: Momina Duraid
- Production location: Pakistan
- Cinematography: Azhar Abbas Kazmi
- Editor: Faizan Ghori
- Camera setup: Multi-camera setup
- Running time: approx. 43-45 minutes
- Production company: MD Productions

Original release
- Network: Hum TV
- Release: 30 December 2019 – 30 June 2020

Tera Yahan Koi Nahi (Urdu: تیرا یہاں کوئی نہیں, lit. 'Nobody is yours here') is a Pakistani television series produced by Momina Duraid under their production banner MD Productions. It stars Kinza Hashmi, Asad Siddiqui, Savera Nadeem, Anam Tanveer, Nadia Hussain and Farhan Ali Agha in pivotal roles.

== Plot ==
The plot focuses on the relationship of a mother and her daughter, and how the mother's gentle nature causes a rift between the daughter and mother with the daughter believing her mother is being a 'doormat'. The serial also explores the love story of old age couples.

== Cast ==
- Kinza Hashmi as Maryam
- Asad Siddiqui as Waqas
- Savera Nadeem as Hawaa
- Nadia Hussain as Arsalan's mother
- Farhan Ali Agha as Safeer
- Anam Tanveer as Rubi
- Adla Khan as Ghazala
- Adnan Shah Tipu
- Sajjad Paul as Waqar
- Gul-e-Rana as Safeer's mother
- Noaman Sami as Arsalan
- Nida Mumtaz as Waqas's mother
- Akhter Hasnain
- Ahmad Harhash

== Music ==
The show's theme song is composed by Atif Ali, with lyrics from Sabir Zafar sung by Samra Khan.
