= Ishqaaway =

Pakistani television series

- Genre: Love story
- Written by: Maira Sajid
- Directed by: Ali Faizan
- Starring: Sami Khan; Rabab Hashim; Sonia Mishal; Qavi Khan; Naima Khan; Adla Khan; Sumbul Shahid
- Country of origin: Pakistan
- Original language: Urdu
- No. of episodes: 33

Production
- Producer: Babar Javed
- Production location: Pakistan
- Running time: 40 min

Original release
- Network: Geo Entertainment
- Release: 27 July – 17 November 2015

Ishqaway (Urdu: عشقاوے) is a 2015 Pakistani drama television series directed by Ali Faizan, produced by Babar Javed, and written by Maira Sajid. The drama stars Sami Khan, Rabab Hashim, and Sonia Mishal in lead roles and first aired on 27 July 2015 on Geo Entertainment. The series aired every Monday and Tuesday at 9:00 P.M and also aired on the Indian channel Zindagi under the same title.

== Synopsis ==
Haim and Amaal are being pressured into marrying each other. Haim finds himself falling for Amaal's best friend, Saafina. Will he respect his family's wishes or pursue Saafina?

== Cast and characters ==
- Sami Khan as Haim
- Sonia Mishal as Amaal
- Rabab Hashim as Safinaa
- Qavi Khan
- Ghana Ali
- Hammad Farooqui as Nail
- Zainab Ahmed
- Munazzah Arif as Almas
- Hashim Butt
- Sophia Ahmed
- Naima Khan
- Haseeb Khan
- Sumbul Shahid as Safinaa's mother
- Imran Ahmed
- Areeba Ali
- Rohail Haider
- Shabana Kanwal
- Tanveer Malik
- Zafar Abbas
- Adla Khan
- Safdar Gondal
