= Resham =

Pakistani film and television actress

- ریشم
- Born: October 2, 1968 (age 58); Faisalabad, Punjab, Pakistan
- Occupations: Film actor, television actor
- Years active: 1992 – present
- Awards: Pride of Performance Award by the President of Pakistan in 2021; Nigar Award in 1999

Resham ریشم (Born: Saima Shah صائمہ) is a Pakistani film and television actress and model.

She made her film debut with Jeeva in 1995, and was a leading actress of Lollywood during the 1990s. Her notable film credits include Jeeva (1995), Ghunghat (1996), Dupatta Jal Raha Hai (1998), Pal Do Pal (1999), and Swaarangi (2015). She won a National Award for Best Actress for her performance in the film Sangam (1997), and the Nigar Award for Best Actress for the film Jannat Ki Talash (1999).

== Early life ==
Resham got her early education in Lahore and studied till matriculation. She comes from a Punjabi family. Her mother died when she was seven and was raised by her elder sister.

== Career ==
=== Cinematic breakthrough and success ===
Resham made her cinematic debut with Syed Noor's revenge-thriller Jeeva in 1995. She had previously played minor roles in television dramas. She then starred in several of Syed Noor's commercially successful films throughout the 1990s, including the melodrama Chor Machaye Shor, the drama Ghunghat (both 1996) and the romance Sangam (1997) – for which she received a National Award for Best Actress, She then starred in the Syed Noor's-directed female-centric Dupatta Jal Raha Hai (1998), and Samina Peerzada's directorial debut Inteha (1999), based on the subject of marital rape. She continued to portray leading and supporting roles in Pakistani films until the decline of Lollywood in the early 2000s.

=== Transition to television and sporadic work in films ===
With the decline in Lollywood, Resham began to take television projects regularly in the following decade; and played the pivotal role in Umera Ahmed's written Man-o-Salwa. She received a nomination of Lux Style Award for Best TV Actress - Satellite for her performance at the 7th Lux Style Awards.

In 2008, she depicted a village-based resilient housewife coping with poverty and the death of her husband in the drama Muthi Bhar Chaawal. The serial was based on Rajinder Singh Bedi's Urdu novella Ek Chadar Maili Si, and Resham termed her part as "the first role of its kind that she has portrayed in her career". The performance earned her a nomination of Best TV Actress - Satellite at the 8th Lux Style Awards.

In 2009, she paired with Humayun Saeed in the romance-drama Aashti, depciting a Karachi-based Bengali housemaid. The performance earned her another nomination of Lux Style Award for Best TV Actress - Satellite at the 8th Lux Style Awards. In 2011, she made a cameo appearance in her cinematic comeback in Reema Khan's romance-drama Love Mein Ghum. Resham then depicted the procurer of a brothel in Samira Fazal's written drama Sanjha.

In 2012, she portrayed Mehrunissa in Zafar Mairaj's written romance-drama Ashk, co-starring Sohail Sameer and Fawad Khan. In a review by The Express Tribune, the reviewer Hareem Ahmed opined that she sports "same pained expression in almost every scene" and faulted her for lacking on-screen chemistry with Sameer. In the same year, she played a lovestruck maiden from a lower locality in Fasih Bari Khan's written Mohabbat Jaye Bhar Mein. In 2013, she appeared in Bari Khan's Taar-e-Ankaboot, portraying an unsatisfied masochist housewife.

She returned to lead cinematic role with the social-drama Swaarangi in 2014, which highlighted the issue of drug addiction and the impact of it on the lives of addicts and their families. Resham portrayed Salam, a troubled housewife due to the addiction of her husband and related problems, in the film. Swaarangi was a commercial failure, and was banned in several cities throughout the country. In 2017, she participated in a fashion week organized by the Pakistan Fashion Design Council (PFDC).

From 2017 to 2019, she played the pivotal role of Sajna Sapairan, a snake charmer in the supernatural drama series Naagin, which is Pakistan's first-ever television serial based on the concept of Ichchhadhaari Naagin. In an interview, she described her part in the series as a "negative character but quite glamorous.". In November 2018, Resham joined Khalil-ur-Rehman Qamar's written and directed romance-drama Kaaf Kangana, but quit it in the same month due to professional reasons.

In 2019, she played the titular character of spiritual and influential matriarch in the family drama Noor Bibi. The same year, she starred as a headstrong lawyer opposite Agha Ali in the romance-drama Muthi Bhar Chahat.

In 2022, Resham returned to Punjabi cinema with Bilal Lashari action-drama The Legend of Maula Jatt, appearing in the special appearance of the mother Maula Jutt, the titular character of the film. Her next role was of a newspaper editor in the crime-thriller Gunjal, inspired by Iqbal Masih case.

In 2026, Resham portrayed a poverty-stricken housemaid whose teenage daughter gets illegitimate pregnancy in the episode "Paheli" of the anthology-series Circle.

== Personal life ==
In June 2017, Resham announced that she would be getting married in 2018. Her husband was said to be a businessman in Europe and that she would also move there after her marriage. She denied these reports in 2019.

In April 2018, soon after Meesha Shafi's allegations of sexual harassment against Ali Zafar, Resham supported Zafar, stating: "Ali knows the difference between friendship and harassment. He cannot do such a thing."

== Philanthropy ==
During the 2010 Pakistan floods, Resham sent a truck carrying flood relief goods including items such as mineral water, pulses, and milk to the affected areas through the Express Helpline Trust. Her first truck was sent to Rahim Yar Khan and the second to Kot Addu.

In 2011, she visited Lahore's Bari Studio and distributed money among struggling actors, technicians, and dancers.

== Awards and recognition ==
=== Awards ===
Year	Ceremony	Category	Project	Result	Ref(s).
1997	National Awards	Best Film Actress	Sangam	Won	
1999	Nigar Awards	Best Film Actress	Jannat ki Talash	Won	
2004	Lux Style Awards	Best Film Actress	Laaj	Nominated	
2008	Lux Style Awards	Best TV Actress (Satellite)	Man-O-Salwa	Nominated	
2009	Lux Style Awards	Best TV Actress (Satellite)	Muthi Bhar Chaawal	Nominated	
2010	Lux Style Awards	Best TV Actress (Satellite)	Aashti	Nominated	
2013	Lux Style Awards	Best TV Actress (Terrestrial)	Ik Yad Hai	Nominated	
2016	Hum Awards	Best Soap Actress	Ishq Ibadat	Won	

=== Honours ===
Year	Title	Presenter	Notes
2021	Pride of Performance	Government of Pakistan	

== Selected filmography ==
Year	Movie	Role	Ref.
1995	Jeeva	Dilaara	
1995	Aawargi		
1996	Chor Machaye Shor	Faree	
1996	Ghunghat	Roxy	
1996	Love 95		
1996	Kuriyon Ko Dale Daana		
1997	Sangam	Resham	
1997	Aanchal		
1997	Yes Boss		
1997	Muhabbat Hai Kya Cheez		
1997	Sharafat		
1998	Dupatta Jal Raha Hai	Kiran	
1998	Very Good Dunya Very Bed Log		
1999	Inteha	Sheena	
1999	Jannat Ki Talash	Salma	
1999	Pal Do Pal	Khushboo	
2000	Reshmaa	Reshmi	
2002	Toofan		
2006	Pehla Pehla Pyaar	Nida	
2006	Tarap		
2015	Swaarangi	Salma	
2023	Sanak	Saleena	
2023	Gunjal	Sarwat Rehman	

== Television ==
Year	Title	Role	Notes	Refs.
1992	Din	Nawal		
1994	Dukh Sukh			
1995	Kahani Ghar	Zarri	Episode "Amar Bail"	
1995	Uraan	Plane Passenger		
2006	Banjar	Shahania		
2007	Man-O-Salwa	Zainab/ Parizaad		
2008	Muthi Bhar Chaawal	Rano		
2009	Tere Liye	Mehar Bano		
2009	Aashti	Aashti		
2010	Chatt	Slana		
2011	Payal			
2011–2012	Ik Yaad Hai	Asiya		
2011–2012	Sanjha	Mumtaz		
2012	Ashk	Mehrunissa "Mehru"		
2012	Kaghaz Ki Nao			
2012	Laaj	Gada		
2012	Mohabbat Jaye Bhar Mein	Shagufta		
2013	Taar-e-Ankaboot	Tabinda		
2014	Dhol Bajnay Laga	Parizaad		
2015	Ishq Ibadat	Sobia/ Sobi		
2016	Mere Humdum	Hoor Bano		
2017	Masoom	Fabiha	Episode 1–6	
2017–2019	Naagin	Sajna		
2018	Dukh Sukh	Karam	Episode "Maafi"	
2018–2019	Chakkar	Zeba		
2018–2019	Noor Bibi	Noor Bibi		
2019	Muthi Bhar Chahat	Tehzeeb		
2021	Terha Aangan	Rashk-e-Qamar	Episode 1–6	
2026	Circle	Shamshad	Episode "Paheli"	

== See also ==
- List of Pakistani actresses
