= Mumtaz Hamid Rao =

Pakistani newspaper editor (1941–2011)

Mumtaz Hamid Rao (1941 – 2011)

Mumtaz Hamid Rao (Urdu: مُمتاز حمِید راؤ) (16 June 1941 in Sialkot, Pakistan – 8 November 2011 in Rawalpindi) was a senior Pakistani electronic media journalist and analyst.

== Career ==
Mumtaz Hamid Rao was picked in 1965 as the first news editor and reporter after PTV began transmission on 26 November 1964 and retired as its director of news.

In 2001, Rao launched Pakistan's first daily online newspaper, Pakistan Times, of which he remained as editor-in-chief. Before that, he worked as a TV journalist and a former director of news at Pakistan Television Corporation.

He joined Pakistan Television (PTV) in 1965 from the Pakistan Press Association, where he was chief reporter in Lahore and retired as the director of news and current affairs of PTV.

Educated at Murray College in Sialkot and later at the University of Punjab, where he graduated in law, he has been responsible for conducting a number of journalistic courses in PTV. He headed the News and Current Affairs department in Lahore in 1972. In 1979, he made a tour of Europe to study different European network systems and completed a four-month attachment with BBC.

== Death and legacy ==
Mumtaz Hamid Rao died on 8 November 2011 after a brief illness. His survivors include his widow and four sons.

Mumtaz Hamid Rao was the son of a well-known Kashmiri freedom movement activist and a journalist Abdul Hamid Nizami, who was also known for his work as the director of Sericulture Department. Former prime ministers of Azad Kashmir, Chaudhry Abdul Majeed and Barrister Sultan Mehmood Chaudhry both expressed their shock and grief over the death of Mumtaz Hamid Rao. They both described his death a great loss to the Pakistani journalist community and particularly to the Kashmir freedom struggle.

== See also ==
- List of Pakistani journalists
- Pakistan Television
