= Intezaar (TV series) =

- Title screen
- Written by: Asma Sayani
- Directed by: Kashif Nisar
- Starring: Mikaal Zulfiqar; Sana Javed; Anum Fayyaz; Durdana Butt
- Country of origin: Pakistan
- Original language: Urdu
- No. of episodes: 21

Production
- Producer: A-Plus
- Camera setup: Multi-camera setup

Original release
- Network: A-Plus TV
- Release: 2 June – 27 October 2016

Intezaar (transl. Wait) is a Pakistani Urdu-language family drama series, produced by A-Plus. The drama originally aired on A-Plus Entertainment in 2016, on Prime time every Thursday. It stars Anum Fayyaz, Mikaal Zulfiqar and Sana Javed in lead roles. Intezaar is a story of tragedy and romance intertwined together.

== Cast ==
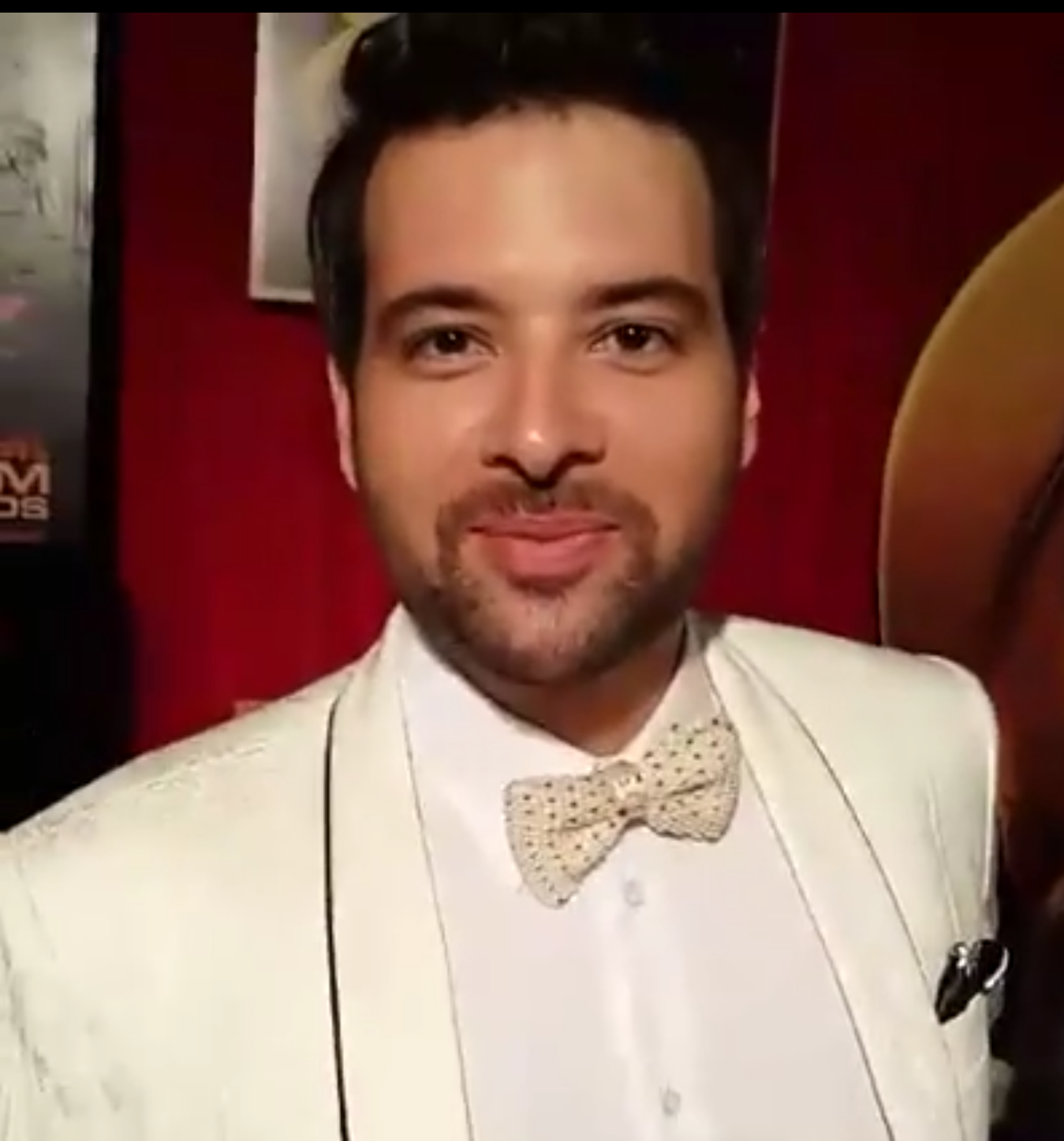
Mikaal Zulfiqar
- Mikaal Zulfiqar as Shariq
- Sana Javed as Zoya
- Anum Fayyaz as Saba
- Ismat Iqbal as Zoya's mother
- Azfar Rehman as Azmeer
- Faiza Gillani as Naila
- Sajida Syed as Azmeer's mother
- Durdana Butt as Zoya's grandmother
- Munazzah Arif as Nafisa
- Mehmood Akhtar as Azmeer's father
