= Parvarish (2014 TV series) =

2014 Pakistani television series

- Genre: Romance; Drama
- Created by: Ironline productions
- Based on: Original Script
- Written by: Momina Khursheed Ali
- Directed by: Mohsin Mirza
- Starring: Azfar Rehman; Anum Fayyaz; Sidra Batool; Babar Khan; Saba Faisal (For entire cast see the section of cast below)
- Opening theme: "Parvarish"
- Country of origin: Pakistan
- Original language: Urdu
- No. of seasons: 1
- No. of episodes: 36

Production
- Camera setup: Multi-Camera setup
- Running time: 35-37 minutes

Original release
- Network: ARY Digital

Related
- Khilona

Parvarish (Urdu: پرورش) is a 2014 Pakistani television series. It started on 23 September 2014 and ended on 17 March 2015. It is written by Momina Khursheed Ali. It is produced by Ironline productions. It is directed by Mohsin Mirza. It stars Azfar Rehman, Anum Fayyaz, Sidra Batool, Babar Khan and Saba Faisal in lead roles.

== Soundtrack ==
=== Music ===
The Parvarish theme song is sung by Beena Khan. Lyrics for the song are written by Sahir Ali Bagga. The opening theme and ending theme is Apni Parvarish.

=== Track listing ===
No.	Title	Artist (s)	Length
1.	"'Parvarish'"	Beena Khan	2:20

== Cast ==
- Azfar Rehman as Raafeh
- Anum Fayyaz as Noor-ul-Ain
- Sidra Batool as Isbah
- Babar Khan as Babar
- Saba Faisal as Dilawaiz, Raafeh and Babar's mother
- Firdous Jamal as Ibrahim, Raafeh and Babar's father
- Jinaan Hussain as Sundas
- Naveed Raza as Rameez
- Mehmood Akhtar as Isbah's father
- Seemi Pasha as Isbah's mother
- Farah Nadir as Noor's step mother
- Shahzad Raza as Noor's father
- Aasiya Amjad as Natasha
