= Nadia Hussain =

Pakistani actress and model (born 1979)

Nadia Hussain Khan
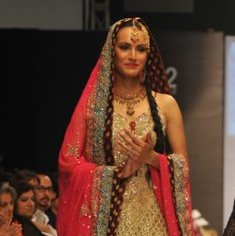
- Nadia Hussain at Pakistan Fashion Week in 2010.
- Born: Nadia Hussain; 11 January 1979 (age 47); United Kingdom
- Occupations: Actress, swimmer, supermodel, dentist, beauty instructor
- Years active: 2000–present
- Height: 178 cm (5 ft 10 in)
- Spouse: Atif Khan (m. 2003)
- Children: 4
- Relatives: Tina Sani (aunt); Tabinda Chinoy (aunt)

Nadia Hussain Khan (Urdu: نادیہ حسین, born 11 January 1979) is a Pakistani television actress, host, supermodel, entrepreneur and fashion designer. She's recognized as one of Pakistan's first supermodels.

== Career ==
Hussain was born in the United Kingdom and came to Karachi, Pakistan at the age of four.

Hussain started her career in modelling in 2000, just after she had completed her A-levels. Hussain, just 20 at the time, appeared in a modelling shoot for a Winter Collection of Lakhani Silk Mills. She was the only Pakistani model to have been chosen by Rizwan Beyg for the Sarajevo Fashion Week.

As an actress, she has worked in various dramas.

She is a practicing dentist, owns a salon, and has her own lawn collection and footwear line called Fetish.

She is the niece of the renowned Pakistani singer Tina Sani.

She did her first shoot for Herald magazine with Deepak Perwani and Tapu Javeri as fashion designer and photographer.

== Personal life ==
Hussain got married at the age of 24 to investment banker Atif Khan in 2003. She is the mother of four children.

== Television ==
- Ishq Junoon Deewangi (Hum TV)
- Ladies Park (Geo Entertainment)
- Manay Na Ye Dil (Hum TV) as Rubab
- Noor Bano (Hum TV) as Sara
- Omar Dadi aur Gharwalay (ARY Digital)
- Sitamgar (Hum TV) as Zeba
- Choti Si Kahani (PTV Home) as Mishal
- Shert (Urdu 1) as Afroze
- Mithu Aur Aapa (Hum TV)
- Kitni Girhain Baaki Hain (Hum TV)
- Ittehad Ramzan
- Tera Yahan Koi Nahin
- Raja Ki Raji
- Thays as Shahista
- Jalan (ARY Digital) as Kinza
- Chupke Chupke (Hum TV) as Amma Chuumantar
- Yun Tu Hai Pyar Bohut (Hum TV)
- Pehchaan (Hum TV) as Shaheena
- Fitna (Hum TV) as Talat
