= Muhammad Younis Butt =

Pakistani humorist

- Born: Muhammad Younis Butt; 4 January 1962 (age 64); Gujranwala, Punjab, Pakistan
- Education: King Edward Medical College
- Occupations: Humorist, writer, columnist
- Children: Mohammad Asbaq Younis, Muhammad Akbar Younis, Azan Younis, Hania Younis
- Writing career
- Genre: Humor
- Subject: Urdu
- Notable works: Family Front; Hum Sab Umeed Sai Hain; Hum Sab Ajeeb Se Hain

Muhammad Younis Butt (born 4 January 1962) is a Pakistani screenwriter and humorist notable for his comedy and satire TV shows.

He is also a column writer and executive producer. His most popular show is Hum Sab Umeed Sai Hain. Most of his TV shows were derived from his writings. His current show is Hum Sab Ajeeb Se Hain which is being broadcast on Aaj Entertainment.

== Early life ==
Muhammad Younis Butt was born on 4 January 1962 in Gujranwala, Punjab, Pakistan. After finishing his basic education, he received his MBBS (Bachelor of Medicine, Bachelor of Surgery) from King Edward Medical College, Lahore. During his student life, he was involved in many dramatic/theater-based activities, and started working on his comedy books while still in college.

== Professional career ==
His first most popular drama, as a writer, was Family Front. This play won the Nigar Award in 2000. It was one of the few humor shows of the time when the state-run PTV was the only TV channel available in Pakistan. His later work Hum Sab Umeed Sai Hain is one of the most popular shows in Pakistan. In March 2012, Younis Butt left Geo News and joined Dunya TV. It has its own Bas Kar Awards. Ladies Park a comedy show of Geo TV was written by him. Nowadays, His current sitcom show Hum Sab Ajeeb Se Hain is running successfully on Aaj Entertainment.

== Writings ==
His books include:

- Family Front – Award-winning popular drama on PTV
- Hum Sab Umeed Sai Hain – Pakistani TV show with political humor on Geo TV
- Romeo Weds Heer
- Shahrukh Ki Saaliyan (2019)
- Barfi Laddu (2019)
- 2011 Mehngai Awards – A political humour award show aired on Geo TV.
- Double Trouble (book)
- Butt Tamiziyan - Pakistani TV show with political humour on Dunya TV.
- Kharmastiyaan
- Laaf Park
- Ladies Park
- Gharmastiyyan
- MisFit (2001)
- S.H.E
- Yeh Duniya Hai Dil Walon Ki - comedy series on geo TV
- Khundkariyaan
- Aks Bar Aks
- Hawaiyaan
- Shaitaniyaan
- Noke Joke
- Tu Tu Main Main
- Mazahiyaat
- Khunda Zan
- Mazah Bakhair
- Joke Dar Joke
- Afrah Tafreeh
- Butt Soortiyaan
- Butt Paray
- Mazah Pursi
- Ghuldasta
- Dil lagi (2003–2005) PTV
- Kallabaziyaan
- Batt Kariyaan
- Mazah Gardi
- Dino Ki Dulhaniya (2017)
- S.H.E comedy drama on GEO TV
- MissFire comedy on geo TV
- Shanakhat Parade 1
- Shanakhat Parade 2 new book in 2025

== Awards and honors ==
- He was awarded the Nigar Award for Family Front.
- The Bus Kar Awards, which are Hum Sab Umeed Sai Hain's own awards, have been held twice for the performers of Hum Sab Umeed Sai Hain.

Ptv world award 1999 For family front Graduate film awards 2001-2
