= Nazir Begum =

Pakistani singer

- نذیر بیگم
- Born: Nazir Begum; 15 May 1939 (age 87); Faisalabad, British India
- Other name: Nazeer Begum
- Occupations: Folk Singer; Radio Singer; Playback Singer
- Years active: 1952–2016
- Children: 3
- Relatives: Maqsood Ahmed (brother-in-law)

Nazir Begum (born 15 May 1939), also known as Nazeer Begum (Urdu: نذیر بیگم), is a prominent Pakistani folk, classical, and playback singer, particularly known for her contributions to the Punjabi and Urdu cinema during the "Golden Era of Lollywood" era in the 1960s and 1970s.

== Early life ==
Nazir Begum was born in Faisalabad on May 15, 1939 after partition of India then her family migrated to Pakistan. At a young age, she moved to Peshawar, where she started singing. She loved singing from childhood and used to sing at her school. This early passion led her to pursue singing professionally. While in her early teens, around 13 or 14, she started singing at Radio Pakistan in Peshawar. The prominence of radio in the 1950s meant this was a prestigious position.

After marrying at a young age in Peshawar, she and her husband relocated to Karachi. Nazir Begum's brother-in-law was the renowned Pakistani cricketer Maqsood Ahmed. Maqsood used his influence to help Nazeer Begum's career. He referred her to his friend, Hameed Naseem, a producer at Radio Pakistan in Karachi. In the mid-1950s, before the widespread availability of television, Radio Pakistan was the most influential medium for information and entertainment. It had a reach that extended across both domestic and international audiences. The radio network acted as an important training ground for budding artists. It provided a platform for live performances, allowing Nazir Begum to learn and hone her skills alongside established classical and semi-classical musicians.

== Career ==
Nazir Begum's film career began in Karachi. She first sang a song for the film Sailab, which starred Sabiha Khanum, Farida Khanum and Masood and featured music by Asghar Ali Muhammad Hussain. Later the producers of Hamari Zaban, the first film produced in Karachi, invited her to sing five songs. The music was composed by Ghulam Nabi Abdul Latif, but the film ultimately failed at the box office and was only released in the Karachi circuit. Her third film, Mehfil, was released on June 17, 1955, and starred Sabiha, Sudhir, and Allauddin. This provided her with further exposure in the film industry. During this period, she also demonstrated her versatility by lending her voice to the first Sindhi film Umar Marvi.

In 1960, it was most significant turning point in her career occurred when the popular playback singer Zubaida Khanum retired from Lollywood after getting married. Nazir Begum was invited to fill this void by singing for Lahore-based films, with a focus on the Punjabi language. Her folk songs, such as Kala Doriya Kunde Naal Aryai Oye, were already widely popular on Radio Pakistan, which built a foundation for her film career. She received invitations to sing for films produced by Aslam Irani and Shabab Kiranvi. During this time, she delivered several instant hits, including Nimbuan Da Jora Assan Bagay Wichaun Toreya and Thora Thora Chann Wekhya, Buhta Reh Gaya Ghataan Dei Ohlay. In the film Babul Da Wehra, she performed a duet song with Naseem Begum.

Despite her extensive output, the success ratio was not consistently high, due to the variable quality of the films being produced at the time. To improve her singing, she became a dedicated pupil of classical music so she became a student of classical music under Ustad Payare Khan. After Ustad Payare Khan's death, she continued her classical training with his son, Ustad Umeed Ali Khan of the Patiala Gharana.

She was known for her ambition and versatile singing style. She sang in all local languages and even in foreign languages during her visits abroad as part of government cultural delegations to countries like China and Korea. Over the course of her career, Nazir Begum recorded three hundred songs across approximately one fifty films.

After receiving advice from Agha G. A. Gul, the owner of Evernew Studios in Lahore. Nazir Begum relocated to the city to pursue a career in the film industry. She began singing for both Urdu and Punjabi films. Her first recorded song, Rasham Da Lacha Lak Wei, was a duet with Zubaida Khanum for the film Yakke Waali, which starred Musarrat Nazir and Sudhir. Nazir Begum's popularity rose with the song Rut Mastani, Haye Jawani, Raha Na Jaye Re, Haye Re, which was featured in the film Tees Maar Khan and filmed on actress Shirin. The song was composed by Hassan Latif and became one of her signature tunes.

In 1963, she recorded the popular track Samaa Jab Pyara Pyara Ho for the film Maan Ke Aansoo. Composed by Manzoor Ashraf, the song was filmed on actors Roshan and Naghma Begum and featured in Shabab Kiranvi's film starring Nayyar Sultana and Habib.

Nazir Begum was also known for her duets with other notable singers of the era. Her collaborations with Ahmed Rushdi, Masood Rana and Irene Parveen are still well-regarded. She frequently sang with singer Khursheed Begum. One of her memorable duets was with Mehdi Hassan, titled Yei Chandani Yei Saaye, Pehlu Main Tum Ho Merey, for the film Miss 56.

In 2000, she was honoured by Radio Pakistan, Lahore with a Life Achievement Radio Award for her contribution to the music industry.

== Personal life ==
Nazir Begum is married and has three sons. One of her sons became a doctor, another an engineer, and a third, a banker. Her son Khawer, a banker, lives in Lahore. Khawer worked for a period at Izzat Majeed's Sachal Studios while it was in operation, until the studio's closure due to Majeed's dementia.

== Filmography ==
=== Television ===
Year	Title	Role	Network
1971	PTV Music Show	Herself	PTV
2000	Khawateen Times	Herself	PTV

=== Film ===
Year	Film	Language
1953	Sailab	Urdu
1956	Miss 56	Urdu
1961	Insan Badalta Hai	Urdu
1962	Azra	Urdu
1963	Tees Maar Khan	Punjabi
1965	Ik Si Chor	Punjabi
1965	Pilpli Sahib	Punjabi
1965	Mann Mouji	Punjabi
1965	Malangi	Punjabi
1966	Chughalkhor	Punjabi
1966	Bharia Mela	Punjabi
1966	Tabedar	Punjabi
1967	Yaaran Naal Baharan	Punjabi
1968	Pind Di Kurri	Punjabi
1968	Kurmai	Punjabi
1969	Kousar	Urdu
1969	Neela Parbat	Urdu
1969	Ishq Na Puchhay Zaat	Punjabi
1970	Hamjoli	Urdu
1970	Yeh Rastay Hayn Pyar Kay	Urdu
1970	Laralappa	Punjabi
1970	Bazi	Urdu
1970	Darinda	Urdu
1970	Att Khuda Da Vair	Punjabi
1971	Jor Javana Da	Punjabi
1971	Baba Dina	Punjabi
1971	Ghunghroo	Punjabi
1971	Bazigar	Punjabi
1972	Umrao Jaan Ada	Urdu
1973	Ik Dhee Punjab Di	Punjabi
1973	4 Khoon day Pyasay	Punjabi
1973	Nishan	Punjabi
1977	Dharti Lahu Mangdi	Punjabi
2016	Sajra Pyar	Punjabi

== Cultural ambassadorship ==
Her ambition extended beyond local music. She was also part of government cultural delegations, singing in foreign languages during visits to countries like China and South Korea.

== Awards and recognition ==
Year	Award	Category	Result	Title	Ref.
2000	Radio Pakistan, Lahore Award	Life Achievement Radio Award	Won	Music	
