= Devar Bhabi =

Pakistani film

- Original title: دیور بھابھی
- Directed by: Hassan Tariq
- Written by: Ali Sufiyan Afaqi (dialogues)
- Screenplay by: Haasan Tariq
- Story by: Arsh Lakhnavi
- Produced by: Sabiha Khanum (credited as Sabiha Raza)
- Starring: Waheed Murad; Sabiha Khanum; Rani
- Music by: Inayat Hussain
- Production company: Santosh Productions
- Release date: 5 May 1967
- Country: Pakistan
- Language: Urdu

Devar Bhabi is a 1967 Pakistani film directed by Hassan Tariq. It is produced by Sabiha Khanum under the banner Santosh Productions. The film features Waheed Murad and Khanum in titular roles, with Rani in a pivotal role, and Santosh Kumar in a guest appearance. The music composer of the film's soundtrack was Inayat Hussain.

== Plot ==
Despite the poverty, Jamila and Raza, brother and sister-in-law of Khalid, fix his marriage with his classmate Naheed, on his wish. On fixing their marriage, a neighbour of Raza who likes Naheed gossips in front of him about Khalid and Jamila, to which he kills him in a fenzy. Raza was sentenced to death, and Khalid and Jamila are left only in the house with Najam, Jamila, and Raza's daughter. Tired of tainting and chatter about their relationship, Jamila gets Khalid married to Naheed. After marriage, Naheed too doubts their relationship. One day, she insults Jamila, to which she leaves the house with her daughter.

== Cast ==
- Waheed Murad as Khalid
- Sabiha Khanum as Jamila
- Rani as Naheed
- Lehri
- Baby Najmi as Najma
- Asad Jafri
- Santosh Kumar as Raza Ali

== Music and soundtrack ==
The music of Devar Bhabi was composed by Inayat Hussain and Fayyaz Hashmi was the lyricist.

- Yeh Mera Ghar Meri Jaant by Noor Jehan
- Is Bazm-e-Jahan Mein Kya Cheez Mohabbat Hoti Hai by Munir Hussain, Shoukat Ali and chorus
- Three Cheers for Bhabhi, Hip Hip Hurray by Ahmed Rushdi
- Yeh Kaghaz-e-Phool Jese Chehray by Mehdi Hassan
- Tum Wohi Ho, Lo Tumhen Aaj Bta Deta Hun by Ahmed Rushdi

== Release and reception ==
Devar Bhabi was released on 5 May 1967, in the cinemas of Karachi and Lahore.

It attained the Golden jubilee status with a theatrical run of 50 weeks.

== Awards ==
Devar Bhabi won a Nigar Award in the following category:

Year	Award	Category	Awardee	Ref.
1967	Nigar Awards	Special Award	Sabiha Khanum	

== Impact ==
The film's success proved to be a major breakthrough for Rani and established the career in Lollywood.

The film was remade as a television film in 2013 by the same title, produced by Tarang Houseful. It starred Saima and Sami Khan.
