= Qatil (1955 film) =

1955 Pakistani Urdu-language film directed by Anwar Kamal Pasha

- Directed by: Anwar Kamal Pasha
- Screenplay by: Hakim Ahmad Shuja
- Story by: Hakim Ahmad Shuja
- Produced by: Agha G. A. Gul
- Starring: Sabiha Khanum; Santosh Kumar; Musarrat Nazir; Aslam Pervaiz
- Music by: Inayat Hussain
- Release date: 21 January 1955
- Country: Pakistan
- Language: Urdu

Qatil is a 1955 Pakistani Urdu-language film directed by Anwar Kamal Pasha and written by his father Hakim Ahmad Shuja. The film stars Santosh Kumar and Sabiha Khanum in the lead roles. Released nationwide on 21 January 1955, Qatil marked the debut of actors Musarrat Nazir, Aslam Pervaiz, Nayyar Sultana, and Diljeet Mirza in supporting roles, as well as playback singer Saleem Raza. The film is regarded as among the signature works of Pasha. Its ghazal "Ulfat ki nai manzil ko chala", performed by Iqbal Bano, achieved widespread popularity.

== Plot ==
Bankay Bihari Laal is a young man from a village who spends his days gambling. His mother urges him to move to the city in search of employment, but he refuses. When a wealthy businessman, Seth Kishori Laal, and his daughter Saroj visit the village, Bankay saves them from a thief. In gratitude, Seth invites Bankay to visit him in the city.

Bankay eventually relocates to the city, taking lodgings at the home of an elderly man, Banarsi Laal, and securing a position as a clerk in Seth's company. Saroj falls in love with Bankay, and Seth consents to their marriage. Bankay, however, is already married: following Banarsi Laal's death, he had wed Meena at the old man's request. Concealing his marital status out of desire for Seth's wealth, Bankay attempts to poison Meena. She survives but is cast out and taken in by villagers.

One of the villagers later brings Meena to Seth's household, where she finds work as a servant. She eventually discovers that Bankay intends to marry Saroj. In the meantime, Saroj's former fiancé, Ashok, an army officer, returns after a period of imprisonment abroad, disrupting Bankay's plans. In a rage, Bankay attempts to shoot Saroj, but she survives and he is forced to flee.

Learning that Seth has offered a reward for his capture, Bankay presents himself at Seth's house and surrenders, requesting that the reward money be used to build a hospital for the poor. He accuses Seth of exploiting him and thereby driving him to attempt to kill his wife. Saroj then reveals that Meena is alive and living in their household. Reunited with Meena, Bankay is overcome with relief. Seth releases the couple and provides Meena with a substantial sum of money.

== Cast ==
- Santosh Kumar as Bankay Bihari Laal
- Sabiha Khanum as Meena / Basanti
- Musarrat Nazir as Saroj
- Aslam Pervaiz as Ashok
- Bibbo as Maata Ji
- M. Ismael as Seth Kishori Laal
- Nayyar Sultana (credited as Nazli)
- Diljeet Mirza

== Soundtrack ==
The music was composed by Inayat Hussain.

Qatil
No.	Title	Lyrics	Singer(s)	Length
1.	"Ulfat Ki Nai Manzil Ko Chala, Tu Baanhain Daal Ke Baanhon Mein"	Qateel Shifai	Iqbal Bano
2.	"O' Mayna, Na Jaanay Kya Ho Gaya, Kahan Dil Kho Gaya"	Tufail Hoshiarpuri	Kausar Parveen
3.	"Aatey Ho Yaad Baar Baar, Kaisey Tumhe Bhulayen Hum"	Qateel Shifai	Saleem Raza
4.	"Dil Ki Yeh Aawaz Hai"	Qateel Shifai	Kausar Parveen and chorus
5.	"Le Ke Pyar Ka Pyam Sanwali Saloni Shaam Aagayi"	Qateel Shifai	Munawar Sultana
6.	"Thandi Aahein Bharein"	Qateel Shifai	Kausar Parveen
7.	"Waah Re Badaltey Zamanay"	Saifuddin Saif	Munawar Sultana

== Production ==
While developing the story of Qatil, Pasha encountered difficulty in reviving the character of Meena, whom the script had initially killed off. He sought assistance from Saadat Hasan Manto, who was at the time employed in the story department of Shahnoor Studios. Despite having previously expressed criticism of Pasha's work, Manto resolved the narrative problem in exchange for five hundred rupees.

== Release and reception ==
Qatil was released on 21 January 1955. The film completed a golden jubilee run at the box office.
