= Lori (film) =

Pakistani film

- Original title: لوری
- Directed by: S. Suleman
- Written by: Zakir Hussain
- Screenplay by: Ahmed Nadeem Qasmi
- Produced by: Himayat Ali Shair
- Starring: Zeba; Talat Siddiqui; Santosh Kumar; Muhammad Ali
- Music by: Khalil Ahmed
- Release date: 1966
- Country: Pakistan
- Language: Urdu

Lori is a 1966 Pakistani film directed by S. Suleman and produced by Himayat Ali Shair, who also wrote the lyrics, in his debut production. Zeba, Santosh Kumar, Muhammad Ali, Talat Siddiqui and Saloni starred in the film. Based on a story by Zakir Hussain, the dialogues were written by Ahmed Nadeem Qasmi, and music composition was of Khalil Ahmed.

== Plot ==
Najma is a doctor by profession. When she is appointed in another city, she locates to the house of her old friend, Zarri, from that city. Zarri is married to Javed and has a 6-7 year old son, Munna. Her brother, Saleem, and sister-in-law, Farida, also live with them. Shortly after her arrival, Najma gets attached to Munna due to her loving nature, and he finds happiness in her company.

One day, Zarri gets into an accident and is taken to the hospital. Najma tries to save her but fails. On her deathbed, Zarri takes a promise from Najma that she will always take care of her son. Najma agrees, and Zarri passes away. After Zarri's death, Najma manages to take care of the orphaned Munna in the best possible way.

One night, Javed enters her room just to observe her, but she gets frightened and leaves the house the following morning. Munna and Saleem, who both love her, try to bring her back but are unsuccessful despite their high requests. However, she agrees to return when Munna harms himself. Upon her return, Javed proposes to her, and she accepts, but only for Munna's sake.

Saleem is heartbroken by this development, and his love for Najma transforms into hate when Farida, who loves Saleem, convinces him that Najma might have killed Zarri to take her place in the house and that her love for Munna and Saleem could be fake. Saleem blames Najma everywhere they encounter, labeling her a witch and making Munna stay away from her.

Late one night, Najma and Saleem unintentionally come across each other and part ways after Saleem's usual blaming. Javed learns about it, and the next day, he again finds them together while Najma is just there to see Munna. In a fit of rage, Saleem slaps Najma, tearing apart her character. Farida, who has learned that love cannot be achieved through hateful ways, repents her deeds and arrives just in time to tell the truth about Najma's greatness and her own antics against her.

== Cast ==
- Zeba as Dr. Najma
- Talat Siddiqui as Zarina "Zarri"
- Santosh Kumar as Javed
- Muhammad Ali as Saleem
- Master Rufi as Munna
- Saloni as Farida

== Production ==
The film was the produced by eminent poet Himayat Ali Shair, as his first film production venture. The principal photography took place in Bari Studio, Lahore.

== Soundtrack ==
All music is composed by Khalil Ahmed.

No.	Title	Singer(s)	Length
1.	"Main Khushi Se Kyun Na Gaoon"	Mujeeb Alam
2.	"Chanda Ke Hi Dolay Mein"	Surayya Hyderabadi
3.	"Taali Bajje Bayi Taali Bajje"	Irene Perveen, Mala Begum
4.	"Khudawanda Yei Kaisi Aag Si Jalti Hei Seene Main"	Mehdi Hassan

== Reception ==
In a review, the film was placed among the films of the year that deserve a mention for being a good example of filmmaking.

=== Accolades ===
Lori won 3 awards at the annual Nigar Awards ceremony.

Award	Awardee
Best Screenplay	Ahmed Nadeem Qasmi
Best Sound Editor	Hassan Zia
Special Award	Master Rufi
