= Qaidi (1962 film) =

- Directed by: Najam Naqvi
- Written by: Hasrat Lakhnavi (story); Ahmad Rahi (dialogues)
- Produced by: Agha G. A. Gul
- Starring: Shamim Ara; Darpan
- Music by: Rashid Attre
- Production company: Evernew Studio
- Release date: 15 May 1962
- Country: Pakistan
- Language: Urdu

Qaidi is a 1962 Pakistani film directed by Najam Naqvi. It was produced by Agha G. A. Gul under banner Evernew Studio. It stars Shamim Ara and Darpan. The film festures the evergreen poem of Faiz Ahmad Faiz, Mujh Se Pehli Si Mohabbat Mere Mehboob Na Maang sung by Noor Jehan.

== Cast ==
- Shamim Ara
- Darpan
- Agha Talish
- Nazr
- Lehri
- Allauddin
- Salma Mumtaz
- Panna
- Himalaya Wala
- Sultan Rahi (extra)

== Soundtrack ==
All music was composed Rashid Attre.

Song title	Sung by	Lyrics by	Music by
"Ek deewane ka is dil ne kaha maan liya"	Noor Jehan, Mehdi Hassan	Qateel Shifai	Rashid Attre
"Mujh Se Pehli Si Mohabbat Mere Mehboob Na Maang"	Noor Jehan	Faiz Ahmad Faiz	Rashid Attre
"Yaad kar kar ke mein sari raat roti rahi"	Noor Jehan	Ahmad Rahi	Rashid Attre
"Kisi ki mohabbat mein hum kho gye hain"	Noor Jehan	Muzaffar Warsi	Rashid Attre
"Sun sanwali surat wale, ik pyar bhara dil kya bole"	Naseem Begum, Mala Begum	Nakshab	Rashid Attre
"Meri sarkar tu be-kar biggar jati hai, meri bigri ban jati hai"	Ahmed Rushdi, Irene Perveen	Aziz Kashmiri	Rashid Attre
"Mere dil ki anjuman main tere gham se roshni hai"	Saleem Raza	Habib Jalib	Rashid Attre
