= Naela (1965 film) =

1965 Pakistani romantic musical drama film

- Urdu: نائلہ
- Directed by: Sharif Nayyar
- Written by: Sharif Nayyar & Adeeb (dialogues)
- Screenplay by: Sharif Nayyar & Adeeb
- Story by: Razia Butt
- Based on: Naela by Razia Butt
- Produced by: G. A. Gul
- Starring: Shamim Ara; Santosh Kumar; Darpan
- Cinematography: Nabi Ahmed
- Edited by: M. A. Latif
- Music by: Inayat Hussain
- Production company: Evernew Studio
- Release date: 29 October 1965 (Pakistan)
- Country: Pakistan
- Language: Urdu

Naela is a 1965 Pakistani musical romance drama film, directed by Sharif Nayyar, who also wrote the screenplay. The film is based on the novel of the same name by Razia Butt. It stars Shamim Ara in the title role with Santosh Kumar and Darpan in substantial roles. The film revolves around Naela who finds herself caught in a heartbreaking love triangle.

Naela was released on 29 October 1965, and was commercially successful with a record theatrical run in Peshawar. The music of the film was composed by Inayat Hussain. It became popular due to the gahzal "Gham-e-dil ko, in ankhon se, chhalak jana bhi aata hai", performed by Mala. The film was also screened at the Lok Virsa Museum of Pakistan in 2016. Naela is often cited as the first full-length colour film of the then West Pakistan, however Ek Dil Do Diwane, released an year earlier, was the actual first full-length colour film made in the West Pakistan.

== Plot ==
Naela is busy with the arrangements of the family gatherings at her aunt's house. The gathering is held due to her cousins Zafar (also her fiancé) and Akhtar. She loves Zafar and vice versa. On arrival, Akhtar becomes free with her, makes jokes and laughs as he used to do in his childhood. Naela wants to spend time with Zafar, but every time either it can't happen or Akhtar comes. Several events take place that confuse both of them that either she/he loves him/her or not. Naela's friend Simki, who often visits Naela, confesses her love for Zafar which he denies, and Akhtar sees it. He asks her if she likes him and tries to assault her, but Zafar reaches there, slapped by Akhtar, but saves Simki.

Later, one day Akhtar and Naela go horseback riding, where Akhtar tells her that he loves to spend time with her and he is in love with her. Naela rejects him, goes back, and confines herself in a room, as she had injured herself by falling from the horse. There, Akhtar comes again to tell her that he loves her. He then tells her mother that he wants to marry Naela, who gets worried about the fate of her sons. She wants to do justice with them, but Akhtar's love wins, and she decides to marry him with Naela, as Zafar is her stepson.

== Cast ==
- Shamim Ara as Naela
- Santosh Kumar as Zafar
- Darpan as Akhtar
- Ragni as Zafar and Akhtar's mother
- A. Shah
- Gul Rukh
- Saqi
- Husna
- Kumar

== Soundtrack ==
All lyrics are written by Qateel Shifai, Himayat Ali Shair; all music is composed by Inayat Hussain.

No.	Title	Lyrics	Music	Singer (s)	Length
1.	"Mujhay arzoo thi jis ki, Woh payam aa gaya hay"		Master Inayat Hussain	Mala Begum
2.	"Gham-e-Dil ko, in ankhon se chhalak jaana bhi aata hai"	Qateel Shifai	Inayat Hussain	Mala	3:49
3.	"Ab thandi ahen bhar pagli, Jaa aur mohabbat kar pagli"	Qateel Shifai		Mala
4.	"Dil ke veeranay mein ik shama hai roshan kab se"	Himayat Ali Shair		Mala
5.	"Hai yehi mohabbat ki reet, Jaye na jawani beet"			Mala and others
6.	"Mohabbat ke jahan mein, Husn kay dum se ujala"			Mala, Naseem Begum and others
7.	"Door veeranay mein ik shama hai roshan kab se"	Himayat Ali Shair		Mala & Masood Rana

== Release and reception ==
The film released on 29 October 1965 and was a hit at the box office. It had a theatrical run of 51 weeks in Karachi cinema with a Golden Jubilee hit. The film ran for a record three years in Firdos cinema, a local cinema in Peshawar. Lok Virsa Museum screened the film in 2016 to retain the classical cinema from Rawalpindi, where the film was shot.

The film was selected among the "Top ten films" of Pakistani cinema by critic Aijaz Gul for the Cinemaya.

== Awards ==
At the 1965 Nigar Awards, this film received eight Nigar Awards.

Year	Award	Category	Awardee	Result	Ref.
1965	Nigar Awards	Best Film	Agha G. A. Gul	Won	
1965	Nigar Awards	Best Director	Sharif Nayyar	Won	
1965	Nigar Awards	Best Actress	Shamim Ara	Won	
1965	Nigar Awards	Best Musician	Inayat Hussain	Won	
1965	Nigar Awards	Best Female Playback Singer	Mala	Won	
1965	Nigar Awards	Best lyricist	Qateel Shifai	Won	
1965	Nigar Awards	Best Art director	S. M. Khwaja	Won	
1965	Nigar Awards	Best cinematographer	Nabi Ahmed	Won	
