= Sharif Nayyar =

Pakistani film director and screenwriter (1922–2007)

- Born: 1922; Lahore, British India
- Died: April 24, 2007 (aged 84–85); Lahore, Pakistan
- Occupations: Film director; Screenwriter
- Years active: 1936–1994
- Awards: Won 3 Nigar Awards in 1965, 1971 and 1999

Sharif Nayyar (c. 1922 – 24 April 2007), was a Pakistani film director. Having a career spanning over four decades, he directed his first film in 1947 in British India and directed a total of 13 films including a Punjabi film. In Pakistani cinema, Nayyar is known for directing one of Lollywood's earliest colour films, Naela (1965) and a Diamond jubilee film Dosti (1971). For directing these films, he received two Nigar Awards.

== Life and career ==
Nayyar was born in Lahore. He began his career from acting in Laila Majnu, starring Swaran Lata and Nazer while Yadgaar was his first film as a director. He rose to fame from commercially successful Naela which released in 1965 and was based on the novel of the same name by Razia Butt. In 1966, he directed his first Punjabi film Laado. In 1971, he directed Dosti which was the second Diamond Jubilee film in the cinema at that time.

== Filmography ==
Key
†	Denotes films that have not yet been released

#	Title	Year	Director	Screenwriter	Notes	Ref.
1	Yadgar	1947	Yes	Yes	Hindi film	
2	Anokhi Dastaan	1950	Yes		First film in Pakistan	
3	Bheegi Palkein	1952	Yes	Yes		
4	Mehfil	1955	Yes			
5	Masoom	1957	Yes			
6	Ishq Par Zor Nahi	1963	Yes	Yes		
7	Naela	1965	Yes	Yes		
8	Laado	1966	Yes		Punjabi film	
9	Naaz	1969	Yes	Yes		
8	Dosti	1971	Yes			
11	Ek Thi Ladki	1973	Yes		co-director	
12	Shirin Farhad	1975	Yes			
13	Jhoomar Chor	1986	Yes			

== Awards and nominations ==
Nayyar received three Nigar Awards in his career;

- 1965 – Best Director for Naela (1965 film)
- 1971 – Best Director for Dosti (1971 film)
- 1999 - Millennium Special Award from Nigar Awards
