= Saathi (1959 film) =

1959 Pakistani film

- Original title: ساتھی
- Directed by: Al-Hamid
- Written by: Iqbal Rizvi
- Produced by: Darpan
- Starring: Darpan; Neelo
- Music by: Fateh Ali Khan
- Release date: 1959
- Country: Pakistan
- Language: Urdu

Saathi is a 1959 Pakistani black-and-white film directed by Al-Hamid, and produced by Darpan who also played the leading role in it opposite Neelo. The story writer was Iqbal Rizvi and Fateh Ali Khan composed the music.

Saathi became a milestone for its actors with Neelo took on one of her early lead roles and rising to become a leading actress after the film’s success, Waheed Murad marked his screen debut who appeared in a cameo, and Darpan debuted as a film producer and later went on to win his first Nigar Award for Best Actor for his performance.

== Cast ==
- Darpan as Anwar
- Neelo as Salma/ Janu
- Husna
- Nazar
- Naeem Hashmi
- Talish
- Waheed Murad (cameo)

== Production ==
Saathi was produced by Darpan in his debut film production, directed by Al-Hamid, and S. Suleman was the assistant-director. At that time, Darpan was struggling to establish his career and writer Iqbal Rizvi suggested him to produce his own film, leading him to invest his payment of his 1957 film Noor-e-Islam for buying raw material to begin the production and signing the lead actress Neelo opposite himself.

== Release ==
Released in 1959, Saathi was a silver jubilee hit film of the year.

== Awards ==
Year	Award	Category	Recipient/nominee	Result	Ref.
1957	Nigar Awards	Best Actor	Darpan	Won	

== Legacy ==
Waheed Murad made a cameo in the film, marking his first ever on-screen appearance. The commercial success of Saathi cemented the career of Neelo, leading her to become among the successful leading actresses of the 1960s and 1970s. The success of the film prompted assistant-director S. Suleman to director and following the success he went on to collaborate with Darpan again for their next venture Gulfam.
