= Gumnaam (1954 film) =

1954 Pakistani Urdu film

- Directed by: Anwar Kamal Pasha
- Written by: Hakim Ahmad Shuja
- Screenplay by: Anwar Kamal Pasha
- Produced by: Agha G. A. Gul
- Starring: Sabiha Khanum; Sudhir; Nasreen; Himalyawala; Ragni; Seema; M. Ismail; Asif Jah
- Music by: Inayat Hussain
- Production company: Shahnoor Studios
- Release date: 1954 (Pakistan)
- Country: Pakistan
- Language: Urdu

Gumnaam (lit. 'Anonymous'), sometimes spelled Gumnam, is a 1954 Pakistani Urdu language crime blockbuster film directed and screenplay by Anwar Kamal Pasha, produced by Agha G. A. Gul and written by Hakim Ahmad Shuja.

Music composed by Inayat Hussain, it stars Sabiha Khanum, Sudhir, Himalyawala, Seema and Ragni in the lead. In 2018, Lok Virsa Museum displayed the film as part of special showcase of the feature films in the country. The film is primarily known for its music and lyrics, and is recognized as one of the music blockbuster films of the Pakistani cinema of the 1950s.

It talks about sexual desire and crime, involving a village girl and a boy who is intentionally trapped by a club owner in a case, leading his fiancée to wait for months to reply to the love letters she sends the boy.

== Plot ==
Sudhir is a criminal who left the village to escape police arrest. After evacuation, the two lost contact, and they keep writing letters to each other as a result. His fiancee has never been to school, and she always seeks help from each other to read letters. Due to the absence of her fiancé, she suffers from a memory disorder such as trauma. One day, her fiance is arrested by law enforcement agencies, but before he went to jail, he writes a letter to her fiance explaining the situation. When she opens the letter, a man approaches her and fakes Sudhir's death in an attempt to marry her.

== Cast ==
- Sabiha Khanum
- Sudhir
- Ragni
- Himalyawala
- Nasreen
- Seema
- M. Ismail
- Asif Jah

== Soundtrack ==
All music is composed by Inayat Hussain

Gumnam
No.	Title	Lyrics	Singer (s)	Length
1.	"A Chand Un Say Kehna"	Qateel Shifai	Kausar Parveen
2.	"Bhag Yahan Say Bhag"	Tanvir Naqvi	Fazal Hussain
3.	"Payel Mein Geet Hain Chhamm Chhamm Ke, Tu Lakh Chale Ri Gori Thamm Thamm Ke"	Saifuddin Saif	Iqbal Bano
