= Fazal Hussain (singer) =

Pakistani radio and film singer (1935–1992)

- Born: 1 August 1935; Lahore, British India
- Died: 26 September 1992 (aged 57); Lahore, Pakistan
- Occupations: Singer, playback singer
- Years active: 1953–1971

Fazal Hussain (1 August 1935 – 26 September 1992) was a Pakistani radio and playback singer who was active in the Pakistan film industry from the early 1950s to the early 1970s. He sang for Radio Pakistan throughout his career and is noted for his work with several leading music composers of the period.

== Early life ==
Fazal Hussain was born on 1 August 1935 in Lahore, British India.

== Career ==
Hussain was introduced to film playback singing by composer Ghulam Haider, who cast him in the film Ghulam (1953). His debut Urdu film was Aagosh (1953), for which he sang four songs under composer Inayat Hussain. Over the course of his career he sang more than 80 songs in approximately 60 films. His last film recordings were made for Sadaa-e-Kashmir, which was released as Do Baaghi in 1971.

He worked with many prominent Pakistani composers during his career, including Inayat Hussain, Ghulam Haider, Hassan Latif, Tufail Farooqui, Rafiq Ghaznavi, Feroz Nizami, G.A. Chishti, and Tassaduq Hussain.

== Death ==
Fazal Hussain died on 26 September 1992 in Lahore.

== Selected filmography ==
Song	Film	Year	Lyrics	Music
Aaj Yeh Kisko Nazar Kay Saamnay Paata Houn Mein	Toofan	1955	Saifuddin Saif	G.A. Chishti
Barbad Huway Ham Jin Kay Liye, Dil Peh Aisi Chot Khai	Ghulam	1953		Ghulam Haider
