= Jo Darr Gya Woh Marr Gya =

1995 Pakistani film

- Cover
- Directed by: Iqbal Kashmiri
- Written by: Amjad Islam Amjad
- Screenplay by: Mohiuddin Nawab
- Produced by: S. A. Gul
- Starring: Neeli; Nadeem; Atiqa Odho; Reema; Javed Sheikh; Babar Ali
- Music by: Robin Ghosh; Nusrat Fateh Ali Khan; Ustad Tafu; Amir Munawar
- Distributed by: Evernew Pictures
- Release date: 22 September 1995
- Country: Pakistan
- Language: Urdu

Jo Darr Gya Woh Marr Gya (Urdu: جو ڈر گیا وہ مر گیا) is a 1995 Pakistani suspense-crime thriller film directed by Iqbal Kashmiri, produced by S. A. Gul and written by Amjad Islam Amjad from a screenplay by Mohiuddin Nawab. Produced by Evernew Pictures, it features Babar Ali and Reema as "fixers" working to clear Nadeem's character of wrongful accusations, Javed Sheikh and Atiqa Odho also star. The film is an adaptation of the 1992 American thriller Consenting Adults, directed by Alan J. Pakula.

The film was popular and celebrated for its suspenseful storyline and memorable soundtrack, including music by prominent artists like Nusrat Fateh Ali Khan and Robin Ghosh. The film is loosely inspired by Consenting Adults, yet adapted uniquely to fit Pakistani cultural themes. It also sparked discussions for a bold narrative, completing a successful "golden jubilee" with extended theater runs across Pakistan. The film remains notable for how it showcased Pakistani cinema's capacity to reinterpret international storylines for local audiences, highlighting the chemistry between Babar and Reema as a prominent on-screen duo of the 90s. Jo Darr Gya Woh Marr Gya is considered a classic, standing out for its engaging plot, thrilling sequences, and the performances of its leads, leaving a legacy that continues to intrigue fans today.

== Cast ==
- Neeli
- Javed Sheikh
- Atiqa Odho as Begum Kamal
- Reema Khan as Natsha, Asad's lover
- Nadeem as Afzal
- Babar Ali as Asad

== Reception ==
The film was released in the summer of 1995 and earned major revenue for its production studio. The film did well at the box office by completing 66 weeks in theaters.

Jo Darr Gaya Wo Mar Gaya was initially regarded as bold enough to be banned by some film critics.
