= Aik Gunnah Aur Sahi =

1975 film

- Directed by: Hassan Tariq
- Screenplay by: Agha Hassan Imtisal
- Based on: Mummy by Saadat Hassan Manto
- Produced by: Safdar Masood
- Starring: Rani; Mohammed Ali; Sabiha Khanam; Shahid; Nayyar Sultana; Darpan
- Music by: Nisar Bazmi
- Release date: 25 July 1975
- Country: Pakistan
- Language: Urdu

Aik Gunnah Aur Sahi is a Pakistani Urdu film directed by Hassan Tariq, based on short story "Mummy" by Saadat Hassan Manto, and released in 1975.

== Plot ==
Mummy, is a madam at a brothel. She loves one of her girls, Afshan, like her own daughter, yet she does not hesitate to send her to rich men who spend the night with her in exchange of money. One day, Afshan comes across a man, Asif, who accidentally runs her over with his car and then saves her life by taking her to hospital. After knowing her more, he decides to marry her. Mummy allows him to do so but hides her past. He brings her to his house where she is shocked to see her father-in-law who was one of her clients and was the reason why she had her accident with Asif's car in the first place. The old man dies in shock but that is not the end of Afshan and Asif's misfortunes. The rest of the story narrates that.

== Cast ==
- Rani
- Mohammed Ali
- Sabiha Khanam
- Shahid
- Nayyar Sultana
- Darpan

=== Guest appearances ===
- Agha Talish
- Aslam Pervaiz
- Ilyas Kashmiri
- Kemal Irani

== Release ==
Aik Gunnah Aur Sahi was released on 25 July 1975. It ran for 52 consecutive weeks in Karachi and became a platinum jubilee film.

== Soundtrack ==
Aik Gunnah Aur Sahi
No.	Title	Lyrics	Music	Singer (s)	Length
1.	"Mein Jo Kehta Hun Begunah"	Masroor Anwar	Nisar Bazmi	Mehdi Hassan
2.	"Kya Haseen Jisam Hai"	Saifuddin Saif	Nisar Bazmi	Mehnaz Begum

== Reception ==
=== Critical reception ===
Sabiha Khanum's performance in the film was met with critical acclaim. While commenting on her performance, a reviewer noted that despite overacting sometimes and being pretentious, she managed to give a good performance... a 'Madame with a heart of gold' who is constantly helping destitute women down on their luck.

=== Awards ===
The film received 4 Nigar Awards in 1975 in the following categories.

Category	Awardee
Best screenplay	Agha Hassan Imtisal
Best cinematographer	Babar Bilal
Best Art director	Islam Shahabi
Special Award	Sabiha Khanam
