= Bin Badal Barsaat =

1975 film

Bin Baadal Barsat
- Directed by: Zeenat Begum
- Produced by: Zeenat Begum
- Starring: Zeba; Mohammad Ali; Shahid; Sangeeta; Ilyas Kashmiri; Lehri; Nanha; Nirala
- Music by: Shamim Nazli
- Production company: Zeenat Films
- Release date: 7 March 1975
- Running time: 152 minutes
- Country: Pakistan
- Language: Urdu

Bin Badal Barsaat is a 1975 Pakistani film starring Zeba and Mohammad Ali.

It was directed and produced by Zeenat Begum. The film follows a married couple, Zarina and Judge Akbar Ali, who struggle to have a child. The film also stars Shahid, Sangeeta, Lehri, Nanha, Nirala and Ilyas Kashmiri.

== Synopsis ==
Zarina (Zeba) and Judge Akbar Ali (Ali) struggle unsuccessfully to have a child. The couple eventually succeeds in having a son, but the child goes missing following a convoluted series of events and ends up in a gang of beggars led by Dada (Ilyas Kashmiri). The child and family are eventually reunited thanks to the efforts of a dancing girl named Gori (Sangeeta) and her fiancé Badshah.

== Cast ==
- Zeba as Zarina
- Mohammad Ali as Akbar Ali
- Shahid as Badshah
- Sangeeta as Gori
- Ilyas Kashmiri as Dada
- Lehri
- Nanha
- Nirala
- Seema

== Soundtrack ==
The music is composed by the only female composer of Pakistani film industry Shamim Nazli.

#	Title	Singer(s)
1	"Tu Mera Pyar Hay"	Mehdi Hassan
2	"Bhar Do Jholi Meri"	Sabri Brothers Qawwali Group
3	Chor Chor Chor, Machaya Main Shor	Mala
4	Log Deevanay Hayn	Tassawar Khanum
5	Na Maa Ka Pyar Mila	Mala & Chorus
6	Rim Jhim Naina Barsen	Noor Jehan
7	Sawal Karti Hay Aurat	Mala
8	Tu Jo Aya To Dil Ko Qarar	Mala

== Reception ==
The film was a commercial success upon its release. In a retrospective review published in 2017, the film's plot and acting were panned, but the film's soundtrack, composed by Shamin Nazli, was praised, and the film is described as a valuable case study of women's roles in Lollywood.
