= Darpan (actor) =

Pakistani film actor (1928–1980)

- درپن
- Darpan as Akhtar in 'Naela' (1965)
- Born: Syed Ishrat Abbas; 11 April 1928; United Provinces, British India
- Died: 8 November 1980 (aged 52); Lahore, Pakistan
- Occupations: Actor; Producer
- Years active: 1950–1980
- Spouse: Nayyar Sultana (m. 1962)
- Children: Syed Qaisar Abbas (son); Syed Ali Abbas (son)
- Relatives: Santosh Kumar (brother); Sabiha Khanum (sister-in-law); Mansoor (brother); S. Suleman (brother); Zareen Panna (sister-in-law)
- Awards: Nigar Awards in 1959 and 1960

Syed Ishrat Abbas (Urdu: سیّد عِشرت عبّاس, 11 April 1928 – 8 November 1980), better known by his stage name Darpan (Urdu: درپَن), was one of the original romantic heroes of the "Golden Age" of Pakistan's film industry (also commonly known as Lollywood).

== Early life ==
Syed Ishrat Abbas was born into a middle-class family originally from the United Provinces of British India, where he was born on 11 April 1928 (as per Pakmag website). His older brother, Santosh Kumar, was also a film actor. Another brother, S. Suleman, was a film director.

== Career ==
Darpan was introduced in the film Amanat in 1950 and went on to feature in the Pakistani Punjabi film Billo in 1951. After starring in a few more films produced in Lahore, he decided to try his luck in India, where he only had moderate level of success. Notable films from this period include Barati (1954), Adl-e-Jehangir (1955) alongside Meena Kumari and Heer (1956) alongside Nutan. Both Adl-e-Jehangir and Heer featured Pradeep Kumar in the lead role; Darpan played supporting characters in these films.

Darpan came back to Lahore after a few years, where the film industry was then booming, and he acted in Baap Ka Gunah (1957). He had a breakthrough with his self-produced film Sathi. Raat Ke Rahi (1960), Saheli (1961), Gulfam (1961), Qaidi (1952), Anchal (1962), Baaji (1963), Shikwa (1963), Ik Tera Sahara (1963) and Naela (1965) were some big films in which he played vital roles. Critics applauded his lead role performance back in Pakistan's film Saheli (1960) in which he starred alongside Nayyar Sultana and Shamim Ara.

He won a Best Actor Nigar Award for his performance in Saheli (1960), as well as a Presidential award. His last big film as hero was Payal Ki Jhankar in 1966. He was the hero in two of Waheed Murad's produced films Insaan Badalta Hai (1961) and Jab Se Dekha Hai Tumhen (1963). He played the villain in Ik Gunah Aur Sahi, and was a supporting actor in Khuda Te Maan, Jub Jub Phool Khile (1975) and a few other films.

== Personal life ==
Darpan was a good-looking and attractive man with hazel eyes and a rich playboy's smile. At first glance, he seemed like a non-serious flirt and a 'lady killer'. At least, that was his 'professional image as an actor'. He used to play non-serious fun-loving roles in the movies quite unlike his older actor brother Santosh Kumar who used to take serious romantic roles in the Pakistani movies of the 1950s and 1960s.

When it came to marriage, Darpan fell for a shy, typically eastern and a lady-like fellow actress, Nayyar Sultana. They had been paired together earlier in a super-hit Pakistani film Saheli (1960) which also starred Shamim Ara and was directed by veteran film director S. M. Yusuf.

== Death ==
He died in Lahore on 8 November 1980 at age 52.

== Filmography ==
Darpan did a total of 71 films - 58 films in Urdu language, 3 in Hindi language, 8 in Punjabi language and 2 films in Pashto language.

=== Film ===
==== In India ====
| Year | Film | Role | Language |
|---|---|---|---|
| 1954 | Barati | Atmaram | Hindi |
| 1955 | Adl-e-Jehangir | Prince Khurram | Hindi |
| 1956 | Heer | | Hindi |

==== In Pakistan ====
| Year | Film | Role | Language |
|---|---|---|---|
| 1950 | Amanat | | Urdu |
| 1951 | Billo | | Punjabi |
| 1953 | Mehbooba | | Urdu |
| 1957 | Baap Ka Gunah | | Urdu |
| 1957 | Noor-e-Islam | | Urdu |
| 1958 | Jan-e-Bahar | | Urdu |
| 1958 | Mukhra | | Punjabi |
| 1958 | Rukhsana | | Urdu |
| 1959 | Sahara | | Urdu |
| 1959 | Khullja Sim Sim | | Urdu |
| 1959 | Shama | | Urdu |
| 1959 | Saathi | | Urdu |
| 1960 | Noukari | | Urdu |
| 1960 | Raat Kay Rahi | | Urdu |
| 1960 | Saheli | | Urdu |
| 1961 | Insan Badalta Hai | | Urdu |
| 1961 | Gulfam | | Urdu |
| 1961 | Lakhon Fasane | | Urdu |
| 1962 | Qaidi | | Urdu |
| 1962 | Mousiqaar | | Urdu |
| 1962 | Aanchal | | Urdu |
| 1962 | Beta | | Urdu |
| 1962 | Unchay Mahal | | Urdu |
| 1963 | Jab se dekha hai tumhen | | Urdu |
| 1963 | Yahudi ki larki | | Urdu |
| 1963 | Baaji | Nasir | Urdu |
| 1963 | Teer Andaz | | Urdu |
| 1963 | Shikwa | | Urdu |
| 1963 | Dulhan | | Urdu |
| 1963 | Ik Tera Sahara | | Urdu |
| 1963 | Tange Wala | | Urdu |
| 1964 | Baap ka Baap | | Urdu |
| 1964 | Shikari | | Urdu |
| 1964 | Inspector | | Urdu |
| 1964 | Shabab | | Urdu |
| 1965 | Koh-e-Qaaf | | Urdu |
| 1965 | Naela | Akhtar | Urdu |
| 1966 | Al-Hilaal | | Urdu |
| 1966 | Hamrahi | School Principal | Urdu |
| 1966 | Jalwah | | Urdu |
| 1966 | Mere Mehboob | | Urdu |
| 1966 | Payal Ki Jhankar | | Urdu |
| 1966 | Mojza | | Urdu |
| 1967 | Sham Savera | | Urdu |
| 1967 | Bahadur | | Urdu |
| 1967 | Sitamgar | | Urdu |
| 1967 | Shola Aur Shabnam | | Urdu |
| 1968 | Baalam | | Urdu |
| 1968 | Ik Musafar Ik Haseena | | Urdu |
| 1968 | Saiqa | | Urdu |
| 1969 | Meri Bhabi | | Urdu |
| 1969 | Fasana-e-Dil | | Urdu |
| 1969 | Saza | | Urdu |
| 1970 | Hamjoli | | Urdu |
| 1970 | Chann Sajna | | Punjabi |
| 1971 | Ishq Deevana | | Punjabi |
| 1973 | Khuda Te Maan | | Punjabi |
| 1973 | Azmat | | Urdu |
| 1973 | Khushia | | Punjabi |
| 1974 | Jawab Do | | Urdu |
| 1974 | Deedar | | Urdu |
| 1975 | Nadir Khan | | Punjabi |
| 1975 | Izzat | | Urdu |
| 1975 | Aik Gunnah Aur Sahi | | Urdu |
| 1975 | Jub Jub Phool Khile | | Urdu |
| 1976 | Ajj Di Taza Khabar | | Punjabi |
| 1977 | Cheekh | | Urdu / Pashto |
| 1979 | Nawabzadi | | Urdu |
| 1986 | Laram | | Pashto |

== Awards and recognition ==
| Year | Award | Category | Result | Title | Ref. |
|---|---|---|---|---|---|
| 1959 | Nigar Award | Best Actor | Won | Saathi | |
| 1960 | Nigar Award | Best Actor | Won | Saheli | |

== See also ==
- List of Lollywood actors
