= Azra (film) =

1962 film

- Directed by: Munshi Dil
- Written by: Munshi Dil
- Produced by: Agha G. A. Gul
- Starring: Neelo; Ejaz; Allauddin; Panna; Naeem Hashmi
- Music by: Inayat Hussain
- Production company: Evernew Pictures
- Release date: 13 April 1962
- Country: Pakistan
- Language: Urdu

Azra is a 1962 Pakistani costume film directed by Munshi Dil, and produced by Agha G. A. Gul under Evernew Pictures banner. Neelo played the title role in the film opposite Ejaz. The film is based on the legend of Azra Wameq. The music of the film was composed by Inayat Hussain. Although the film was primarily in black and white, some of the songs were featured in colour.

It was Neelo's first pairing with Ejaz; they would later play together in Dosheeza (1962), Beti (1964), Gehra Daagh (1964) and Badnaam (1966). Although not a commercially successful film initially, Azra gained importance in the 1970s during its later theatrical runs and the film's popular film songs of Inayat Hussain.

== Plot ==
The plot revolves around two lovers, Azra and Wameq. A princess of the state, Azra falls for Wameq at first sight and manages to make him the guest of the palace. There, they both get a chance to know more about each other and come close to each other. After the end of the mehfil, Wameq goes to her bedroom but returns after kissing her. A maid in the palace observes this and informs the King.

== Cast ==
- Neelo
- Ejaz
- Allauddin
- Laila
- Himalyawala
- Naeem Hashmi
- M. Ismael
- Ajmal
- Panna
- Zamurrad
- Zarif (Guest appearance)

== Soundtrack ==
All music is composed by Inayat Hussain.

Azra
No.	Title	Lyrics	Singer (s)	Length
1.	"Jaan-e-Baharan-Rashk-e-Chaman"	Tanvir Naqvi	Saleem Raza
2.	"Aye Janam, Gaye Jawani, Dam Badam"	Tanvir Naqvi	Noor Jehan
3.	"Dil Yun Yun Yun Yun Hota Hai"	Munshi Zahir	Ahmed Rushdi, Naseem Begum
4.	"Sharma Ke Hum Se Aankh Milane Ka Shukria"	Saifuddin Saif	Noor Jehan, Saleem Raza
5.	"Idhar Bhi Dekhiye, Phool Sa Labb, Chandan Sa Badan"	Tufail Hoshiarpuri	Naseem Begum, Nazir Begum and chorus
6.	"Kuch Bhi Na Kaha Aur Keh Bhi Gaye"	Tanvir Naqvi	Noor Jehan
7.	"Gum Huey Rastey, Kho Geyin Manzilain"	Tanvir Naqvi	Saleem Raza
