= Sofia Bano =

Pakistani film actress (1938–2024)

- صوفیہ بانو
- Born: Sofia Bano Begum; 23 October 1938; Bombay, British India
- Died: 20 November 2024 (aged 86); Karachi, Sindh, Pakistan
- Other name: Sufia Bano
- Citizenship: British Indian (1938-1947); Indian (1947-1964); Pakistani (1964-2024)
- Occupations: Actress; Singer; Model
- Years active: 1964–1976
- Spouse: Haroon Ahmed (m. 1978)
- Children: 2
- Awards: Nigar Award: Best Supporting Actress Award for Parday Mein Rehnay Do (1973)

Sofia Bano (23 October 1938 – 20 November 2024) was a prominent Pakistani film actress and singer who worked in the Lollywood film industry during the 1960s and 1970s. Originally from Bombay, India, she moved to Pakistan to pursue a career in cinema and became one of the most respected character actresses of her era. She is best remembered for her award-winning performance in the 1973 film Parday Mein Rehnay Do.

== Early life ==
Sofia Bano was born on October 23, 1938, in Bombay (now Mumbai), British India. She began her acting career in Bombay with supporting roles before being recruited by Pakistani director Javed Hashmi to work in Karachi. She moved to Pakistan in the mid-1960s accompanied by her brothers.

== Career ==
=== Initial leading roles (1964–1968) ===
Bano made her Pakistani film debut in the 1964 film Chhoti Behan, playing a supportive role. Her first role as a lead heroine was intended for the film Sehra, but the project was never completed beyond its song recordings and opening ceremony. One of those songs, "Akeela Na Jana," sung by Naseema Shaheen and picturized on Bano, became a major hit.

In 1966, she starred as a lead heroine opposite Muhammad Ali in Akelay Na Jana, which was a moderate box-office success. During this period, she also appeared in Azadi Ya Mout (1966), a war drama set during the 1965 Kashmir war, where she played the character Reshama, followed by Ham Dono, a film where she starred opposite Syed Kamal in a double role.

In 1968, Tum Mere Ho, she played Sufia, an educated and bold woman married to a man with a disfigured face. Over the next decade, she transitioned into more complex supporting and character roles, often portraying educated, bold, and "proud" women.

=== Transition to character roles and peak success (1969–1973) ===
As her leading roles were able to gain moderate commercial traction, Bano transitioned into more complex supporting and character roles. In 1969, she appeared in the adult-certified social drama Neela Parbat, one of the first Pakistani films inspired by Italian neorealism.

The year 1973 marked the pinnacle of her career with two major hits, including Gharana. She played the patient and devoted wife of Muhammad Ali, a role that showcased her range in traditional family dramas. Later, in Parday Mein Rehnay Do, which was directed by Shabab Kiranvi, Bano played a stubborn, arrogant, and wealthy socialite.

For her performance in Parday Mein Rehnay Do, she won the Nigar Award for Best Supporting Actress in 1973.

=== Success and retirement (1974–1976) ===
Bano remained highly active in the mid-1970s, appearing in five films in 1974 alone, including Do Tasveerein, Sharafat, and her only Punjabi film, Naukar Wohti Da. Her final screen appearance was in the 1976 film Zarurat, directed by Hassan Tariq.

During her 12-year career, Bano appeared in approximately 28 films, including a Punjabi movie.

== Personal life ==
In 1978, Sofia Bano married Haroon Ahmed, a businessman and politician of Pakistan Muslim League from Karachi. Following her marriage, she retired from the film industry. The couple had two children.

== Illness and death ==
Sofia died of natural causes on 20 November 2024 in Karachi, Pakistan.

== Filmography ==
=== Film ===
Year	Film	Language
1964	Chhoti Behan	Urdu
1966	Akelay Na Jana	Urdu
1966	Azadi Ya Mout	Urdu
1966	Ham Dono	Urdu
1967	Meray Laal	Urdu
1968	Manzil Door Nahein	Urdu
1968	Papi	Urdu
1968	Khilona	Urdu
1968	Tum Mere Ho	Urdu
1969	Neela Parbat	Urdu
1970	Maa Te Maa	Urdu
1971	Parai Aag	Urdu
1971	Mohabbat	Urdu
1972	Ehsaas	Urdu
1973	Sarhad Ki Goud Mein	Urdu
1973	Gharana	Urdu
1973	Nadan	Urdu
1973	Parday Mein Rehnay Do	Urdu
1974	Do Tasveerein	Urdu
1974	Sharafat	Urdu
1974	Naukar Wohti Da	Punjabi
1974	Qismat	Urdu
1975	Professor	Urdu
1976	Zarurat	Urdu
Unreleased	Sehra	Urdu
Unreleased	Ham Bhi Parhay Hayn Rahon Mein	Urdu
Unreleased	Halchal	Urdu

== Awards and recognition ==
Year	Award	Category	Result	Title	Ref.
1973	Nigar Award	Best Supporting Actress	Won	Parday Mein Rehnay Do	
