= Sabiha Khanum =

Pakistani actress (1935–2020)

- صبیحہ خانم
- Born: Mukhtar Begum; 16 October 1935; Gujrat, Punjab, British India
- Died: 13 June 2020 (aged 84); Leesburg, Virginia, U.S.
- Other name: First Lady of Pakistani Cinema
- Years active: 1948–2000
- Spouse: Santosh Kumar (m. 1958; died 1982)
- Children: Syed Ahsan Raza, Fareeha Shaharyar and Afia Chaudhry
- Parent(s): Muhammad Ali (Maahia) & Iqbal Begum (Baalo)
- Relatives: Darpan (brother-in-law); Sarish Khan (granddaughter); S. Suleman (brother-in-law); Mansoor (brother-in-law); Nayyar Sultana (cousin); Zareen Panna (cousin)
- Awards: Pride of Performance Award by the President of Pakistan in 1986; 8 Nigar Awards

Sabiha Khanum (Urdu: صبیحہ خانم; born Mukhtar Begum; 16 October 1935 – 13 June 2020) was a Pakistani film actress. She is also known as the "First Lady of Pakistani Cinema", and is often recognized for her role in Pakistani cinema during the 1950s and 1960s. The recipient of the Pride of Performance and Nigar Awards, she debuted in Lollywood films with Beli (1950), and also appeared in television dramas.

Some of her notable films include Do Ansoo (1950), Sassi (1954), Gumnaam (1954), Dulla Bhatti (1956), Sarfarosh (1956), Mukhra (1958), and Devar Bhabhi (1967).

She appeared mostly in Santosh Kumar's films, playing protagonist roles opposite him. Sabiha and Santosh are sometimes known for the on-screen chemistry they shared and built following the 1950s and 60s films, in particular after they worked in the film Qatil (1955).

== Early life ==
Sabiha Khanum was born Mukhtar Begum in a village near Gujrat in Punjab, Pakistan, to Mohammad Ali (Maahia), who was from Delhi, and Iqbal Begum (Baalo), who was a stage and film actress from Amritsar. She was raised in a conservative rural environment by her grandparents but got her first acting opportunity on stage in Lahore, after moving there to be with her father.

A cultural delegation visited a cinema house in Sialkot, Pakistan, in 1948. Mukhtar Begum (then a young girl in 1948), who was part of the delegation, sang the Punjabi song "Kithhay gaey oon pardesia way" from the film Sassi Punnoon (which starred Baalu and Aslam). Her performance was praised, and soon Mohammad Ali introduced his daughter to stage drama writer and poet, Nafees Khaleeli. Noting her determination, Khaleeli offered her a role in the drama Buut Shikan, which she accepted. Nafees Khaleeli gave her the screen name Sabiha Khanum.

== Career ==
At Nafees Khaleeli's request, the film director Masood Parvez offered her a role in the film Beli (1950), giving Sabiha her debut as a film actress. Beli was also by Masood Pervez's first directorial.

Next, Sabiha played the role of 'Noori' in famous director/producer Anwar Kamal Pasha's Do Ansoo (1950), also starring Santosh Kumar, and Gulshan Ara. It was the first film to celebrate a Silver Jubilee in the new film industry of Pakistan. The film was based on a Noor Jehan earlier hit Bhai Jaan (1945) and looks at how a man inadvertently ruins the lives of his wife and daughter. In fact, such was the impact of the film that it was remade twice, subsequently in Pakistan in Punjabi and Anjuman in Urdu.

Sabiha gained some more recognition in her next movie Aaghosh, directed by Murtaza Jilani, starring Santosh, Sabiha, and Gulshan Ara. Her role, in the film 'Ghulam', released in 1953, directed by Anwar Kamal Pasha, with Santosh, was also well received. Film directors admired her ability to improvise because she was talented and ambitious.

Her role in the film Gumnaam (1954) was also appreciated by the moviegoers. The movie was directed by Anwar Kamal Pasha, starring Seema, Sudhir, and Sabiha Khanum. This film is a story about a intellectually disabled girl, played by Sabiha. She played the role of 'Nooran' in the romantic Punjabi film, Dulla Bhatti (1956), directed by M.S. Daar, and this movie celebrated its Golden Jubilee at the Pakistani cinemas.

Sassi (1954) was based on the well-known tragic love story of Sassui Punnhun and went on to become the first Golden Jubilee film of Pakistan. Indian director Aspi Irani offered Sabiha the titular female lead role in his production Shirin Farhad (1956), which she declined due to scheduling conflicts; eventually Madhubala was cast in the role.

Sabiha's achievement along with Santosh Kumar in the following films is still noteworthy:Mukhra (1958), Muskurahat (1959), Rishta (1963), Hasrat (1958), Ishrat, Shikwa (1963), Teray Baghair (1959), Mauseeqar (1962), Dulhan, Kaneez (1965 film), Dewar Bhabi (1967), Shaam Dhalay (1960), Pak Daman (1969), Anjuman (1970), Sarfarosh (1956), Inteqaam (1955), Qatil (1955), Sawaal (1966), Commander (1968), and Mohabbat (1972). Her role in the film Anjuman (1970 film) was very well-liked, as were director Hasan Tariq's films Tehzeeb (1971) and Ik Gunah Aur Sahi (1975), director Zia Sarhadi's film Rah Guzar (1960), director Zahoor Raja's film Deewana (1964), and director Jameel Akhtar's film Aik Raat.

Altogether, Sabiha starred in 202 movies, mainly in Urdu . She was awarded the 6 Nigar Award and the Pride of Performance Award for her acting career.

Sabiha ventured into television serials in the 1980s. The most notables are Dasht and Ehsaas.

She also sang two patriotic songs:

- Sohni dharti Allah rakhay qadam qadam aabad tujhay
- Jug jug jeeye mera pyara watan, lub pay dua hai dil mein lagun

In Anwar Maqsood's stage show Silver Jubilee in 1983, she rendered the song Yaad karoon tujhay shaam saweray from the film Mauseeqar (1962). As the final lyrics faded away that evening, the audience stood up and applauded.

Sabiha Khanum, who had been in the public eye for four decades, finally retired, and lived with her eldest daughter in the United States. Her other children also settled there.

== Personal life ==
Sabiha married co-star Santosh Kumar on 1 October 1958.

Santosh was already a married man with children. The two, after initial opposition from Sabiha's father, married during the making of Hasrat (1958). They starred together in 47 movies and played a couple in the majority of them. They together had three children, including one son named Syed Ahsan Raza and two daughters named Fareeha Shaharyar and Afia Chaudhry. Sabiha's grand daughter Sarish Khan is a model and actress.

== Illness and death ==
She lived with her daughter in Leesburg, Virginia until her death on 13 June 2020 at the age of 84. She had been hospitalized for the past few months due to kidney issues.

== Filmography ==
=== Television series ===
| Year | Title | Role | Notes |
|---|---|---|---|
| 1983 | Silver Jubilee | Herself | PTV |
| 1987 | Ehsas | Nafees | PTV |
| 1993 | Dasht | Daayi Maa | PTV |
| 1993 | Yes Sir, No Sir | Herself | PTV |
| 1999 | Tawan | Safia | PTV |

=== Film ===
| Year | Title | Language | Role(s) | Notes | Ref(s). |
|---|---|---|---|---|---|
| 1950 | Beli | | | Debut film | |
| 1950 | Do Ansoo | Urdu | Noorie | First Silver Jubilee film of Pakistan) | |
| 1950 | Hamari Basti | | | | |
| 1951 | Ghairat | | | | |
| 1951 | Pinjra | | | | |
| 1953 | Barkha | | | | |
| 1953 | Ghulam | | Bimala | | |
| 1953 | Sailab | | | | |
| 1953 | Aaghosh | | | | |
| 1954 | Gumnaam | | | | |
| 1954 | Raat Ki Baat | | | | |
| 1954 | Sassi | | Sassi | First Golden Jubilee film of Pakistan | |
| 1955 | Inteqam | | | | |
| 1955 | Mehfil | | | | |
| 1955 | Qatil | | Meena alias Basanti | | |
| 1955 | Shararay | | | | |
| 1955 | Sohni | | | | |
| 1955 | Toofan | | | | |
| 1956 | Chhoti Begum | | | | |
| 1956 | Dulla Bhatti | | | | |
| 1956 | Hameeda | | | | |
| 1956 | Hatim | | | | |
| 1956 | Sarfarosh | | Bano | | |
| 1957 | Bholey Khan | | | | |
| 1957 | Daata | | | | |
| 1957 | Ishq-e-Laila | | Laila | | |
| 1957 | Pasban | | | | |
| 1957 | Sardar | | | | |
| 1957 | Saat Lakh | | Kausar Bano | | |
| 1957 | Waadah | | Fareeda | | |
| 1957 | Aankh Ka Nasha | | | | |
| 1957 | Aas Paas | | | | |
| 1958 | Darbar | | | | |
| 1958 | Dil Mein Tu | | | | |
| 1958 | Hasrat | | | | |
| 1958 | Mukhra | Punjabi | Shirin | | |
| 1958 | Sheikh Chilli | | | | |
| 1959 | Muskarahat | | | | |
| 1959 | Naghma-e-Dil | | | | |
| 1959 | Naji | Punjabi | Naji | | |
| 1959 | Tere Baghair | | | | |
| 1959 | Aaj Kal | | | | |
| 1960 | Ayaz | | | | |
| 1960 | Rahguzar | | | | |
| 1960 | Saltanat | | | | |
| 1960 | Shaam Dhalay | | | | |
| 1962 | Mosseqar | | | | |
| 1963 | Daaman | | | | |
| 1963 | Rishta | | | | |
| 1963 | Shikwa | | | | |
| 1964 | Deevana | | | | |
| 1964 | Ishrat | | | | |
| 1965 | Kaneez | | | | |
| 1966 | Sawaal | | | | |
| 1966 | Tasveer | | | | |
| 1967 | Devar Bhabi | | Jameela | | |
| 1967 | Sitamgar | | | | |
| 1967 | Aag | | | | |
| 1968 | Commander | | | | |
| 1968 | Naheed | | | | |
| 1968 | Shahansha-e-Jahangir | | | | |
| 1969 | Ladla | | | | |
| 1969 | Maa Beta | | | | |
| 1969 | Pakdaaman | | | | |
| 1970 | Anjuman | | Noor-u-lain Zartaj | | |
| 1970 | Matrai Maa | | | | |
| 1970 | Mohabbat Rang Laaey Gi | | | | |
| 1970 | Sajna Duur Daya | | | | |
| 1971 | Banda Bashar | | | | |
| 1971 | Bhain Bhara | | | | |
| 1971 | Garhasti | | | | |
| 1971 | Jaltey Sooraj Ke Neechay | | | | |
| 1971 | Tehzeeb | | | | |
| 1971 | Yaar Des Punjab De | | | | |
| 1972 | Ek Raat | | | | |
| 1972 | Mohabbat | | | | |
| 1972 | Sirr Da Saiin | | | | |
| 1972 | Aao Pyar Karein | | | | |
| 1973 | Khawab Aur Zindagi | | | | |
| 1973 | Sharabi | | | | |
| 1974 | Deedar | | | | |
| 1974 | Miss Hippy | | | | |
| 1974 | Pyar Di Nishani | | | | |
| 1974 | Qismat | | | | |
| 1974 | Rangi | | | | |
| 1974 | Sayyo Ni Mera Mahi | | | | |
| 1975 | Bikhrey Moti | | | | |
| 1975 | Dhan Jigra Maa Da | Punjabi | | | |
| 1975 | Farz Te Aulaad | Punjabi | | | |
| 1975 | Aik Gunnah Aur Sahi | Urdu | | | |
| 1975 | Isar | Urdu | | | |
| 1975 | Neki Badi | Urdu | | | |
| 1975 | Pehchan | Urdu | | | |
| 1975 | Roshni | Urdu | | | |
| 1975 | Watan Iman | Punjabi | | | |
| 1975 | Zanjeer | Urdu | | | |
| 1976 | Aulad | Urdu | | | |
| 1976 | Rastey Ka Pathar | Urdu | | | |
| 1976 | Wardat | Punjabi | | | |
| 1976 | Zubaida | Urdu | | | |
| 1977 | Kalu | Urdu | | | |
| 1977 | Mere Hazoor | Urdu | | | |
| 1977 | Aag Aur Zindagi | Urdu | | | |
| 1978 | Abhi Tau Mein Jawan Huun | Urdu | | | |
| 1978 | Haidar Ali | | | | |
| 1978 | Shera | Punjabi | | | |
| 1978 | Tamashbeen | Punjabi | | | |
| 1978 | Shola | Punjabi | | | |
| 1979 | Do Raastey | Urdu | | | |
| 1979 | Raja Ki Aaye Gi Barat | Urdu | | | |
| 1979 | Waaday Ki Zanjeer | Urdu | Maryam | | |
| 1979 | Behan Bhai | Urdu | Qudsiya Begum | | |
| 1980 | Badmashi Band | Punjabi | | | |
| 1980 | Rishta | Urdu | | | |
| 1981 | Anokha Daaj | Punjabi | | | |
| 1981 | Chan Suraj | Punjabi | Hajira | | |
| 1981 | Parvah Nahin | Punjabi | | | |
| 1982 | Sangdil | Urdu | | | |
| 1982 | Wohti Jee | Punjabi | | | |
| 1984 | Ishq Nachawey Gali Gali | Punjabi | | | |
| 1984 | Kamyabi | Urdu | | | |
| 1985 | Angara | Punjabi | | | |
| 1985 | Deewany Do | Urdu | | | |
| 1985 | Mehak | Urdu | | | |
| 1989 | Mohabbat Ho Tau Aisi | Urdu | | | |
| 1989 | Shaani | | | | |
| 1994 | Saranga | Punjabi | Chiragh Khan's wife | Last film | |

=== Other appearance ===
| Year | Title | Role | Network |
|---|---|---|---|
| 1997 | Tum Jo Chaho Tu Suno | Herself | PTV |

== Awards and recognition ==
Sabiha Khanum has won several Nigar awards during her lifetime:

| Year | Award | Category | Result | Title | Ref. |
|---|---|---|---|---|---|
| 1957 | Nigar Award | Best Actress | Won | Saat Lakh | |
| 1963 | Nigar Award | Best Actress | Won | Shikwa | |
| 1967 | Nigar Award | Special Award | Won | Devar Bhabhi | |
| 1975 | Nigar Award | Special Award | Won | Aik Gunnah Aur Sahi | |
| 1981 | Nigar Award | Special Award | Won | Thirty Years of Acting Career | |
| 1982 | Nigar Award | Best Supporting Actress | Won | Sangdil | |
| 1986 | Pride of Performance | Awarded by the President of Pakistan | Won | Arts | |
| 1999 | Nigar Award | Millennium Award | Won | Herself | |
| 2000 | Nigar Award | Honorary Gold Medal | Won | Herself | |

== Artistry and legacy ==
In the book Pakistan Cinema, 1947–1997, author Mushtaq Gazdar noted that Khanum's acting style was influenced by Indian film actress Madhubala. Khanum's career as an actress lasted over four decades, and she is referred to in the media as the "First Lady of Pakistani cinema".

== Sources ==
- Gazdar, Mushtaq (1997). Pakistan Cinema, 1947–1997. Oxford University Press. ISBN 978-0195778175.
