= Naukar Wohti Da =

1974 Pakistani film

- Directed by: Haider Chauhdry
- Written by: Sheikh Iqbal
- Produced by: Chaudhry Ismail
- Starring: Munawar Zarif; Aasia; Mumtaz; Afzaal Ahmad; Nasira; Najma Mehboob; Meena Daud; Shahid; Habib; Agha Talish; Sofia Bano; Iqbal Hassan; Saqi
- Music by: Wajahat Attre
- Release date: 26 July 1974
- Running time: 138 min
- Country: Pakistan
- Language: Punjabi

Naukar Wohti Da (Punjabi: ﻧﻮﮐﺮ ﻭﻭﮨﭩﯽ ﺩﺍ) is a 1974 Punjabi-language Pakistani film, starring Munawar Zarif in the lead role, opposite Aasia. The film tells the story of a hired husband. It was remade in Hindi as Naukar Biwi Ka (1983).

This film is considered one of the most iconic ever made in Pakistan, and was one of the big hits of Munawar Zarif as a lead actor.

== Plot ==
Anwar (Habib), who comes from a wealthy family, defies his father, Khan Bahadur (Agha Talish), and marries a poor but pretty woman (Meena Daud). He is asked to leave the family home for going against his father's wishes. The newlyweds settle elsewhere and soon become the proud parents of a daughter, Razia (Aasia). They meet with the parents of young Munawar (Munawar Zarif) and arrange a child-marriage of their daughter with Munawar. Anwar and his wife die in crisis. Luckily, a loyal employee, Baba Peeru (Saqi), saves their daughter's life. He takes her to Khan Bahadur, who accepts her with tears in his eyes.

Years later, Munawar and Razia have grown up. While Razia still lives with her wealthy grandfather, Munawar's father has died, leaving his widow (Najma Mehboob) destitute. When she goes to confirm their marriage, Razia shuns and humiliates her. This enrages Munawar who then vows to make Razia apologize to his mother, as well as confirm their marriage. To escape marriage, Razia tells Khan Bahadur that she's already married. Munawar travels to city to become an actor and win back Razia. There he meets a famous actress, Mumtaz, who falls in love with him. Munawar meets Razia and recognizes her, Coincidentally, Razia hires Munawar to act as her husband, so that she can get her grandfather to back off. During this period Razia falls in love with Munawar. Razia after slapping Munawar twice for teasing her to marry Mumtaz expresses her love. Munawar tells Mumtaz about Razia, heartbroken Mumtaz commits suicide. Before dying she expresses her love to Munawar.

Munawar and Razia decide to marry before Khan Bahadur knows about the truth, he overhears them, insults Munawar and arranges Razia's marriage. Munawar rescues Razia, and takes her to his mother. Razia apologizes to Munawar's mother. Khan Bahadur and police chase them. Finally, Khan Bahadur finds out that Munawar is the same person Razia was engaged to. He realises his mistake and decides to get them married.

== Cast ==
- Munawar Zarif as Munawar
- Aasia as Razia
- Mumtaz as Mumtaz
- Agha Talish as Khan Bahadur
- Afzaal Ahmad as Akhter
- Nasira as Mary
- Najma Mehboob as Bhola's mother
- Meena Daud as Anwar's wife
- Saqi as Baba Peeru
- Shahid as Shahid
- Habib as Anwar
- Iqbal Hassan as Himself
- Sofia Bano as Herself

== Soundtrack ==
It had superb music by Wajahat Attre and film song lyrics by Khawaja Pervez and Waris Ludhianvi.

- "Toonba Wajda Eei Na Taar Bina" sung by Noor Jehan
- "Zindagi Tamasha Bani, Dunya Da Haasa Bani" sung by Afshan
- "Chhai Chhai Chhai O' Budha Pyar Mangda" sung by Afshan
- "Mainthon Kadi Sajna Bani Na Begana" sung By Noor Jehan
- " Chup Kar Darr Wat Jaa" sung By Masood Rana
- "Chup Kar Darr Wat Jaa" sung By Noor Jehan

The song “Zindagi Tamasha Bani” was used as a central plot point and the title for Sarmad Khoosat’s film “Zindagi Tamasha”(2019).

== Accolades ==
- Nigar Award for Best Film
- Nigar Award for Best Director - Haider Chauhdry
- Nigar Award for Script Writer - Sheikh Iqbal
- Nigar Award for Best Musician - Wajahat Attre

== Remakes ==
- Naukar Biwi Ka (1983 film)
- Naukar Vahuti Da

== Reception ==
Naukar Wohti Da celebrated its Platinum Jubilee at Pakistani cinemas in 1974.
