= Naukar Biwi Ka =

1983 Indian film by Rajkumar Kohli

- Theatrical release poster
- Directed by: Rajkumar Kohli
- Based on: Naukar Wohti Da (1974)
- Produced by: Nishi Kohli
- Starring: Dharmendra; Reena Roy; Raj Babbar; Anita Raj; Kader Khan; Pran; Om Prakash
- Music by: Bappi Lahiri
- Release date: 22 July 1983
- Running time: 2 Hours 46 Mins
- Country: India
- Language: Hindi

Naukar Biwi Ka is a 1983 Hindi romantic comedy film, a remake of the Pakistani Punjabi film Naukar Wohti Da (1974). The film stars Dharmendra, Reena Roy, Raj Babbar, Anita Raj, Kader Khan, Pran and Om Prakash. It was directed by Rajkumar Kohli.

== Plot ==
Inspector Amar Nath apprehends and arrests a notorious gangster who goes by different aliases (Deshbandhu Jagannath, Pinto, Abdul Karim), and gets him sentenced to prison for several years.

Amar, who comes from a wealthy family, defies his father, Jagirdar Bishamber Nath, and marries a poor woman, Sheela Sharma (Neeta Mehta). He is asked to leave the family home. Amar and Sheela settle elsewhere and soon become parents to a daughter, Jyoti. They meet with the parents of young Deepak Kumar and arrange a child-marriage of their daughter with Deepak. Pinto escapes from prison, hunts down Amar and Sheela, and kills them.

A loyal employee and chauffeur, Abdul, saves Jyoti's life. He takes her to her grandfather, who accepts her, feeling remorse for his earlier behavior towards his only son. Years later, Deepak and Jyoti have grown up. While Jyoti still lives with her wealthy grandpa, Deepak's dad has died, leaving Deepak and his mother destitute. When Deepak's mother tries to finalize Jyoti's marriage to her son, Jyoti humiliates her. This enrages Deepak. He goes to confront Jyoti and ends up fighting with Jyoti's boyfriend, Anand. In return, Jyoti slaps Deepak. Deepak vows to make her apologize to his mother for her behavior and change her attitude towards him and their marriage. In a twist of fate, Jyoti has to seek Deepak's help in pacifying her grandfather so that he agrees to her marriage with Anand.

In another part of the story, film star Sandhya meets Deepak and grows fond of him. Jyoti eventually grows jealous of Deepak's friendship with Sandhya and admits that she has feelings for Deepak.

== Cast ==
- Dharmendra as Deepak Kumar/ Raja
- Reena Roy as Sandhya Jagannath
- Anita Raj as Jyoti/Rani
- Raj Babbar as Prabhat Kumar
- Rishi Kapoor in song 'Kya Naam Hai Tera' (cameo)
- Danny Denzongpa (cameo)
- Kader Khan as Deshbandhu Jagannath/Pinto/Abdul Karim
- Rajeev Anand as Anand Jagannath
- Pran as Abdul
- Om Prakash as Jagirdar Bishambharnath
- Vinod Mehra as Inspector Amarnath
- Neeta Mehta as Sheela Sharma
- A. K. Hangal as Mr. Sharma
- Sushma Seth as Sandhya's fake mother
- Madan Puri as film director
- Agha (actor) as Khan
- Jankidas
- Bob Christo as Rustom
- Narsing Yadav

== Soundtrack ==
Lyrics: Anjaan (lyricist)

| # | Song | Singer |
|---|---|---|
| 1 | "Zamana To Hai Naukar Biwi Ka" | Kishore Kumar, Nishi Kohli |
| 2 | "Kya Naam Hai Tera" | Kishore Kumar, Asha Bhosle |
| 3 | "Yaar Mila" | Kishore Kumar, Asha Bhosle |
| 4 | "Main Nahin Doon" | Bappi Lahiri, Asha Bhosle |
| 5 | "O Mere Sajna" | Asha Bhosle |
| 6 | "Dance Music" | Bappi Lahiri |
