= Neela Parbat =

- Directed by: Ahmad Bashir; Hafeez Romani
- Written by: Mumtaz Mufti
- Produced by: Ahmad Bashir
- Starring: Mohammad Ali; Talish; Husna; Komal; Sofia Bano; Kamal Irani; Panna
- Music by: Piarang Qadir; Akhtar Hussain
- Production company: Filmo Eutopia
- Release date: 3 January 1969
- Country: Pakistan
- Language: Urdu

Neela Parbat (Urdu: نیلا پربت, lit. 'Blue Mountain') is a 1969 Pakistani Urdu film produced and co-directed by Ahmad Bashir as his only film. The story of the film was written by renowned Urdu author Mumtaz Mufti, who was inspired by Freud's theory. The lead cast included Mohammad Ali, Talish, Husna, Sofia Bano, Komal and Zareen Panna.

Neela Parbat is the first non-horror film of the Pakistani cinema which was given an Adult certificate, and also among the pioneer films that were inspired by Italian neorealism. The film had music composed by Piarang Qadir and Akhtar Hussain and features classical numbers by several singers. Famous Urdu poets Hafeez Jalandhari and Ibn-e-Insha were among the lyricists. The film became a box office disaster due to its mature theme and distinctive style of body language.

== Plot ==
On his deathbed, Painda Khan's friend takes a promise from him to take care of his daughter Laila 'Laali' for his whole life. After his death, Painda Khan adopts Laali and she starts living in his house. Painda Khan's son Bakhtiar 'Bakhtoo' and Laali soon develop a strong mutual bond. Painda Khan too loves Laali and treats her passionately. He later discovers that he has fallen for her when he finds it unbearable for anyone to be around her, even his own son. Due to his frankness with Laali (who has feelings for him), he wants to marry Bakhtoo with his brother's daughter, who Bakhtoo already has some intimate relations with. This conflict between the father and son and the love of a father for his adopted daughter cause the destruction of relations thereafter.

== Cast ==
The cast of the film include:

- Husna as Laila “Laali”
- Mohammad Ali as Bakhtiyar “Bakhtoo”
- Talish as Painda Khan
- Sofia Bano
- Komal
- Kemal Irani
- Panna
- Azad
- Gotam
- Piyarang Qadir
- Fomi

== Production ==
=== Background ===
It was one of Pakistan's earliest experimental feature films. It had experimentation by the film director with the Freudian sensual themes, which was very unusual for Pakistani cinema at that time. So the film received a 'for adults only' rating. In the film, actress Komal had a really interesting foray into the parallel cinema. She portrayed the sensual plaything for Muhammad Ali's character.

It was filmed in Karachi's Eastern Studio and Lahore's Bari Studio.

=== Crew ===
The film was produced by Ahmed Bashir, directed by Ahmad Bashir with Hafeez Romani as co-director, and written by Mumtaz Mufti. The crew included:

- Cameramen: M. Hussain, Naseem Hassan, Nusrat Butt
- Other's assistant director: Arshad Mirza
- Background music: Saleem Iqbal
- Ass. Cameraman: Masood Butt

== Soundtrack ==
Neela Parbat
No.	Title	Lyrics	Music	Singer (s)	Length
1.	"Gharian Aayi Meet Milan Ki"	Zahoor Nazar	Akhtar Hussain	Noor Jehan
2.	"Chanda Muskaraye Door Se Aur Chakori Roye"	Piyarang Qadir	Piyarang Qadir	Aniqa Bano
3.	"Hum Se Baat Kro Jee, Sanwariya"	Ibn-e-Insha	Piyarang Qadir	Asmara Ahmad
4.	"O Dil Tor Ke Janay Walay, Dil Ki Baat Btata Ja"	Hafeez Jalandhari	Piyarang Qadir	Nazir Begum
5.	"Hey Rey Dagmag Dolay Jeevan Nao"	Zahoor Nazar	Piyarang Qadir	Altaf Mehmood, Asmara Ahmad & chorus

== Release and box office ==
Neela Parbat was released on 3 January 1969. Along with the theatres of nine other cities, it was released in Dacca, Lahore and Karachi. The film was a flop with only 5 weeks at theaters.
