= Barati (1954 film) =

- Directed by: J. K. Nanda
- Starring: Darpan; Chand Usmani; Johnny Walker; Om Prakash
- Music by: Roshan
- Release date: 1954
- Country: India
- Language: Hindi

Barati is a 1954 Bollywood comedy film directed by J. K. Nanda. It stars Darpan, Chand Usmani, Johnny Walker, Om Prakash in pivotal roles. Darpan, a leading Pakistani actor, performed the lead role opposite Chand Usmani.

== Plot ==
A young Laajo's family is worried about finding the right groom for her. A series of comical situations arise when her brother Sunder, with his maternal uncle, sets out to find the right man for his sister.

== Cast ==
- Agha as Sundar
- Darpan as Atmaram
- Chand Usmani as Sunder's sister
- Johnny Walker as Groom
- Om Prakash as Headmaster Bishandas

== Soundtrack ==
Song	Singer
"Aaja Balam Ab Aaja"	Lata Mangeshkar
"Aa Phir Se Mere Pyar Ki"	Lata Mangeshkar
"Koi Kehde Papiha Se Jake"	Lata Mangeshkar
"Kahin Dur Koyaliya Gaye Re, Mera Chhota Sa Dil Ghabraye Re"	Lata Mangeshkar, Sudha Malhotra
"Dhak Dhak Kare Dil"	C. Ramchandra
"Teri Nazron Ne Humko Chheda Hai, Hum Shor Macha Denge"	C. Ramchandra, Asha Bhosle
"Kis Naam Se Pukarun"	Asha Bhosle
"Nach Le Bawariya, Tohe Lene Aaya Sanwariya"	Asha Bhosle, S. Balbir
