= Sassi (film) =

1954 film

- Directed by: Dawood Chand
- Produced by: J.C. Anand
- Starring: Sabiha; Sudhir; Ghulam Mohammad; Shah Nawaz; Asha Posley; Bibbo; Nazar
- Music by: G. A. Chishti
- Production company: Eveready Pictures
- Release date: 3 June 1954
- Country: Pakistan
- Language: Urdu

Sassi is a 1954 Pakistani romance film directed by Dawood Chand and produced by J.C. Anand under the banner of Eveready Pictures.

It was a remake of the director's own Sassi Punnu (1939), which was based on the legend of the same name. In this 1954 film, Sabiha played the title role opposite Sudhir, while Asha Posley, Nazar, and Ghulam Mohammad were in supporting roles. The musical score of the film was composed by G. A. Chishti. Sassi was a commercially successful film, and is recognised as the first golden jubilee hit film of the Pakistani cinema.

== Plot summary ==
The plot is based on Sassui Punnhun, one of the four popular tragic romances of Sindh. It revolves around Sassi, who faces hardships and difficulties while seeking his beloved husband, who was separated from her by the rivals.

== Cast ==
- Sabiha
- Sudhir
- Ghulam Mohammad
- Asha Posley
- Nazar
- Shah Nawaz
- Saleem Raza
- Maya Devi
- Bibbo
- G. N. Butt

== Soundtrack ==
All lyrics are written by Aziz Meeruti; all music is composed by G. A. Chishti

Sassi
No.	Title	Singer (s)	Length
1.	"Chandni Raaton Mein Aa Pyar Ka Naghma Sun Le"	Inayat Hussain Bhatti, Kausar Parveen
2.	"Ghari Dou Ghari Mein Hua Khatam Samjho"	Pukhraj Pappu, Inayat Hussain Bhatti
3.	"Nigahein Mila Ke Zara Muskara Duo"	Pukhraj Pappu, Inayat Hussain Bhatti
4.	"Hatto Bacho, Hatto Bacho"	Pukhraj Pappu & chorus
5.	"Jeene Ka Maza Le Le Pehlu Mein"	Kausar Parveen
6.	"Na Yeh Chand Hoga, Na Taray Rahen Ge"	Pukhraj Pappu, Kausar Parveen
7.	"Ball Paray Taqdeer Mein"	Pukhraj Pappu

== Production ==
Sassi was the remake of director Dawood Chand's 1939 film Sassi Punnu. Sabiha Khanum played the title role in the film, the role played by her mother in 1939 version. The film had a big production budget for that time. Filming took place in Swat region and some areas of Lahore.

Hemant Kumar's song Na Yeh Chand Hoga, Na Taray Rahen Ge was plagiarized in the film.

== Release and reception ==
Sassi was released on 3 June 1954 in the cinemas of Lahore and Karachi. The film ran for 51 weeks and created history by being the first Pakistani film to celebrate its Golden jubilee at the box office.

The film was released in India as well.

=== Critical reception ===
While reviewing the film for the Indian magazine Filmindia, the panned the film stating, ""Sassi" is a trashy import from Pakistan and an ugly rotten affair as a motion picture. This length of darkened exhibition is not worth seeing and not worth looking free by exhibitors. The picture constitutes a damnable risk to any conscientious exhibitor."

== Impact ==
This was the first golden jubilee hit film of the newly established Pakistani film industry, this film helped boost the Pakistani film industry in its earl days.

Due to the film's success, Eveready Pictures made another folktale-based film Sohni (1955), also starring Sabiha and Sudhir.
