= Tees Maar Khan (1963 film) =

1963 film

- Directed by: Haider Chaudhry
- Produced by: Shabab Keranvi
- Starring: Allauddin; Shirin; Sawan; Asif Jah
- Music by: M. Ashraf
- Production company: Shabab Productions
- Distributed by: Shabab Productions
- Release date: August 30, 1963
- Country: Pakistan
- Language: Punjabi

Tees Maar Khan (1963) is a Pakistani Punjabi film which stars Shirin, Allauddin and Sawan in the lead roles.

== Production ==
Alauddin was introduced as a hero for the first time. It was the debut film of actress Shirin and Haider Chaudhry's directorial debut.

== Cast ==
- Allauddin
- Shirin
- Sawan
- Zeenat
- Asif Jah
- ChunChun
- Zahoor
- M. Ajmal

== Music ==
The composers of the music of this film were Manzoor Ashraf (two musicians named Master Manzoor and M. Ashraf). M. Ashraf later separated from Master Manzoor in the late 1960s, went solo and became quite a popular film music director in Pakistan until his death in 2007. The film songs are sung by Naseem Begum, Nazir Begum, Ahmad Rushdi, Shaukat Ali.

- "Nimbuan da jora assan bage wichun toria" Nazir Begum
- "Pyar bina nain milde naan"... Nazir Begum
- "Ni main noukar toon sarkar" ... Ahmed Rushdi, Nazir Begum
- Pagri sanbhal Chora... Shaukat Ali, Nazir Begum
- "We Channa tenoo teri Jatti da salam aey".. Naseem Begum
- "Meri Jhanjhar chhan chhan chhanke".. Naseem Begum
