= Shamim Nazli =

Pakistani music director (1940–2010)

Shamim Nazli شمیم نازلی

Background information
- Also known as: First female musician of Pakistan Cinema
- Born: 1940; Amritsar, Punjab, British India
- Origin: Faisalabad, Punjab, Pakistan
- Died: 27 November 2010 (aged 69–70) Lahore, Punjab, Pakistan
- Genre: Film score
- Occupations: Music director; composer
- Years active: 1969 - 2010
- Children: 1
- Relatives: Mala Begum (sister)

Shamim Nazli (Punjabi, Urdu: شمیم نازلی), (1940 - 27 November 2010) was a Pakistani music director. She composed playback music for movies like Baharein Phir Bhi Ayein Gi (1969) and Bin Badal Barsaat (1975). She was the elder sister of playback singer Mala. She is known to be the only female musician in the history of Lollywood.

== Early life and family ==
Shamim Nazli was born in Amritsar, Punjab, British India, in 1940. After the partition of the Indian subcontinent in 1947, her family migrated to Pakistan and settled in Faisalabad (then Lyallpur). Nazli had a younger sister Mala who later became a famous playback singer of Pakistani film industry. Nazli's uncle Mirza Sultan Baig (Nizam Din) was a radio artist and worked for many years in the famous Punjabi radio program "Jamhoor Di Awaz" (The Voice of People) at Radio Pakistan Lahore. Nazli and her sister Mala, both had a passion for music. She trained her sister Mala in music at home and later, took her to the senior music director G.A Chishti to groom her as a singer.

== Career ==
Shamim Nazli started her career as a music director from the film, "Baharein Phir Bhi Ayen Gi" produced by her sister Mala in 1969. Her music compositions for the movie were widely appreciated. The track, "Piyar Ke naghmay kis ne cherray" became a pop melody in demand. It was a thrilling club song picturized by the actress Rozina. Another song from the movie was, "Khush naseebi hai meri", a romantic duet vocalized by Ahmed Rushdi and Mala. Nazli's second movie was "Night Club" (1971). Though the film didn't go well at the box office, Nazli's music was par excellence. Some notable songs of the movie were "Mila jo piyar tumhara bahar ayi hai" (Rushdi/Mala) and "Sathia o mere sathia kuch keh zara" (Mala). Then Nazli got an opportunity to compose music for a hit movie, "Bin Badal Barsaat" released in 1975. The songs of the movie were very popular; "Sawal Karti Hay Aurat, Jawab Do Mardo, Sada-e-Dard Suno", "Tu Mera Pyar Hay, Tujh Ko Sada Main Chahun Ga", and "Rim Jhim Naina Barsen, Pyasay Hayn Jazbat Tujh Bin, Bin Baadal Barsat". When the actress/director Shamim Ara started her film, "Mera Piyar Yaad Rakhna", she signed Nazli as a music director but that movie never got released in cinemas. Apart from films, Shamim Nazli also worked in a PTV program "Bazm-e-Nagh" and composed songs for Radio Pakistan, Lahore.

In 2008, Nazli planned to release her music album consisting of five songs.

== Personal life ==
Shamim's mother named Masu Bai was a well known singer at Amritsar then after Partition she migrated from India to Pakistan and settled in Faisalabad. She was married and had one daughter named Rukhsana also known as Shama.

== Death ==
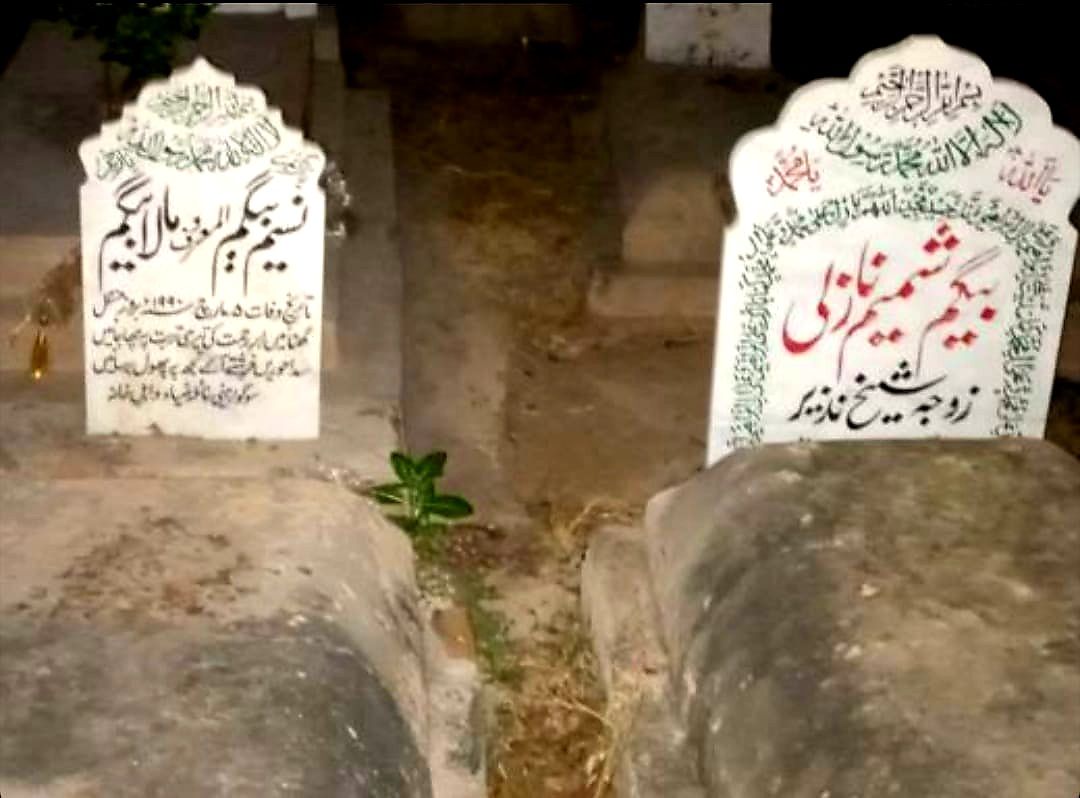
Gravestones of Nazli and her sister Mala Begum at Miani Sahib Cemetery, Lahore

Shamim was admitted to a hospital after she suffered a cardiac arrest and angina but Nazli died on 27 November 2010, and was laid to rest next to her sister Mala's grave at Miani Sahib Graveyard, Lahore.

== Compositions ==
- Gheron se pyar kia mujhe beqara kia zalima ... (Singer:Mala, Movie: Baharen Phir Bhi Ayengi)ef>
- Jeena hai pyarey to pyar keejye ... (Singer: Ahmed Rushdi, Movie:Baharen Phir Bhi Ayengi)
- Khush naseebi hai meri tum ne apnaya hai ... (Singers: Ahmed Rushdi/Mala, Movie:Baharen Phir Bhi Ayengi)
- Merey leye jahan main ab koi bhi khushi nahi ... (Singer: Mehdi Hassan, Movie:Baharen Phir Bhi Ayengi)
- Pyar key naghmen kis ne cherey main to kho gai ... (Singer: Mala, Movie:Baharen Phir Bhi Ayengi)
- Terey baghair zindagi bhatka hua khayal thi ... (Singer: Mehdi Hassan, Movie:Baharen Phir Bhi Ayengi)
- Tum aye ho to ye dil door hogaya gham se ... (Singer: Mehdi Hassan, Movie:Baharen Phir Bhi Ayengi)
- Log deewaney hain kya kaam kya kartey hain ... (Singer: Tassawar Khanum, Movie:Bin Badal Barsaat)
- Na maan ka pyar mila aur na baap ka saya ... (Singer: Mala & co, Movie:Bin Badal Barsaat)
- Tu mera pyar hai tujh ko sada main chahunga ... (Singer: Mehdi Hassan, Movie:Bin Badal Barsaat)
- Rim jhim rim jhim naina barsey pyasey hain jazbaat ... (Singer: Noor Jehan, Movie:Bin Badal Barsaat)
- Tu jo aya to dil ko qaraar aagaya ... (Singer: Mala, Movie:Bin Badal Barsaat)
- Chor chor chor machaya main ne shor ... (Singer: Mala, Movie:Bin Badal Barsaat)
- Sawal karti hai aurat jawab do mardo ... (Singer: Mala, Movie:Bin Badal Barsaat)
- Aa Sanam pyar karen dil se iqraar karen ... (Singer: Mala, Movie:Night Club)
- Sahara de key pyar ka bana hai koi ajnabi ... (Singer: Mala, Movie:Night Club)
- Sathiya o merey sathiya kuch keh zara kuch sun zara ... (Singer: Mala, Movie:Night Club)
