= Insan Badalta Hai =

- Urdu: انسان بدلتا ہے
- Directed by: Munawwar Rasheed
- Produced by: Waheed Murad
- Starring: Shamim Ara; Darpan; Lehri; Nirala; Rehana; Panna; Nighat Sultana; Arsh Muneer
- Music by: Zafar Khursheed
- Release date: 1961
- Country: Pakistan
- Language: Urdu

Insan Badalta Hai is a 1961 Pakistani film produced by Waheed Murad in his debut production. It starred Darpan and Shamim Ara. The film was directed by Munawwar Rasheed.

== Plot ==
The plot revolves around a young woman Jamila, who works as a supervisor at her father's factory. One day, she fires two persons from job due to some misunderstanding. After a few days, his father rehires them when they save his life outside the factory. The factory's owner then appoints one of the person Jamal as his secretary.

Jamila feels embarrassed when she encounters him. However, later a good chemistry develops between them. The owner is also satisfied with him due to the factory commercial progress. He intends to marry him with Jamila. But, his nephew wants to marry her, only to get her wealth.

== Cast ==
- Shamim Ara
- Darpan
- Lehri
- Nirala
- Nighat Sultana
- Panna
- Rehana
- Arsh Muneer

== Release ==
The film was released in May 1961, in the cinemas of Karachi. It was a commercially successful film of the year.

== Soundtrack ==
The music was composed by Khursheed Zafar. All lyrics were written by Izhaar Malihabadi and Fayyaz Hashmi.

- Aye Be-Niaz Maula, Mujhe Tujh Pe Naaz Hai — Zubaida Khanum
- Are O Haseena, Kafir Hassena, Saj Ke Chali — Ahmed Rushdi, Nazir Begum & chorus
- Dil Le Kar Chale Ho Kahan — Ahmed Rushdi & Nazir Begum
- Hum Tum Aur Yeh Khoi Khoi Raat — Zubaida Khanum & S.B. John
