= Mujh Se Pehli Si Mohabbat Mere Mehboob Na Maang =

Poem by Faiz Ahmad Faiz

مجھ سے پہلی سی محبت مری محبوب نہ مانگ

مجھ سے پہلی سی محبت مری محبوب نہ مانگ

میں نے سمجھا تھا کہ تو ہے تو درخشاں ہے حیات

تیرا غم ہے تو غم دہر کا جھگڑا کیا ہے

تیری صورت سے ہے عالم میں بہاروں کو ثبات

تیری آنکھوں کے سوا دنیا میں رکھا کیا ہے

تو جو مل جائے تو تقدیر نگوں ہو جائے

یوں نہ تھا میں نے فقط چاہا تھا یوں ہو جائے

اور بھی دکھ ہیں زمانے میں محبت کے سوا

راحتیں اور بھی ہیں وصل کی راحت کے سوا

ان گنت صدیوں کے تاریک بہیمانہ طلسم

ریشم و اطلس و کمخاب میں بنوائے ہوئے

جا بہ جا بکتے ہوئے کوچہ و بازار میں جسم

خاک میں لتھڑے ہوئے خون میں نہلائے ہوئے

جسم نکلے ہوئے امراض کے تنوروں سے

پیپ بہتی ہوئی گلتے ہوئے ناسوروں سے

لوٹ جاتی ہے ادھر کو بھی نظر کیا کیجے

اب بھی دل کش ہے ترا حسن مگر کیا کیجے

اور بھی دکھ ہیں زمانے میں محبت کے سوا

راحتیں اور بھی ہیں وصل کی راحت کے سوا

مجھ سے پہلی سی محبت مری محبوب نہ مانگ

"Mujh Se Pehli Si Mohabbat Mere Mehboob Na Maang" (translated as "My love, don’t ask me for the love I once gave you") is an Urdu nazm by Faiz Ahmad Faiz. The song is popular through its rendition by singer Noor Jehan and has been notably performed by many others. According to Faiz, the nazm also marks his transition from the romantic work of his earlier years to mature works of his later years.

== History ==
The poem appeared in his first collection of poetry Naqsh-e-Fariyadi, published in 1943. Faiz belonged to the Progressive Writers’ Movement and "Mujh Se Pehli Si Mohabbat Mere Mehboob Na Maang" marks his transition from ‘traditional Urdu poetry, to poetry with purpose’.

== Themes ==
The poet entreats his beloved not to ask of him the love that he once had for her because he has witnessed oppression, violence and death. He tells her that while she still enchants him, he can no longer love her with the same intensity as he cannot turn his gaze away from the brutal realities of society built on inequality and injustice. The poem contrasts and maintains a tension between the disembodied love of beauty and the ugly reality of social disparity and oppression. However, it has been noted that the poetic subject remains a reluctant revolutionary who merely views the scenes of social oppression, immobilized by his beloved's gaze. The poem signals Faiz's evolution from romantic poetry towards poems that deal with social concerns. Faiz himself described it as 'the boundary' between his early romantic work and the mature works of his later years.

== In popular culture ==
The nazm was originally set to music and sung by Noor Jehan at the request of Faiz himself at a gathering held to celebrate his release from prison. It was also set to music for the film Qaidi in 1962. Noor Jehan's rendition of the poem became famous and Faiz is said to have remarked that the poem no longer belonged to him but to Noor Jehan. The poem was parodied by Khalid Akhtar in his novel Bees Sau Gyarah (1950). A line from the poem, "Teri aankhon ke siva duniya mein rakha kya hai", was used by Majrooh Sultanpuri as the opening verse of a song in the Hindi film Chirag (1969). Sahir Ludhianvi’s song "Tum mujhe bhool bhi jaao to yeh haq hai tumko" (1959 Bollywood film Didi) is noted for its similarity of theme with this poem. The song featured in Episode 03 of Season 10 of Coke Studio Pakistan and was sung by Humaira Channa and Nabeel Shaukat Ali as a tribute to Noor Jehan. Zohra Sehgal’s reading of it for the 2012 documentary Zohra Sehgal: An Interview by M. K. Raina went viral on the internet. The 2016 Hindi film Ae Dil Hai Mushkil featured an extract from the nazm.

== English translation ==
Oh my love, don't ask me for the love I once gave you
I thought that life will shine eternally only if I had you

I had your sorrows then the sorrow fights of this world mean nothing to me
Spring becomes long lasting in this world only because of your face

Except your eyes, nothing is there in this world to see
If I found you, my fate would bow before me

This is not how it was, I only wanted that it could be this way
Not only grief of love, the world is full of other sorrows, heartaches

There is happiness other than the joy of union
The dark magic of uncountable dark years

Woven in satin, silk and brocade
In every lane, bodies flesh is sold in market

Covered in dust, bathed in blood
Bodies retrieved from the furnace of diseases

Pus discharge flowing from their rotten ulcers
What can I do sometimes my eyes look in that direction also

Even now your beauty is magical tantalizing but what can be done
Not only grief of love, the world is full of other sorrows, heartaches

There is happiness other than the joy of union
Oh my love, don't ask me for the love I once gave you
