= Sajjad Gul =

Film producer and director

Agha Sajjad Gul (Urdu: آغا سجاد گل) is a producer, director and one of the media moguls in Pakistan. He is the youngest son of renowned film studio owner and a pioneer of Pakistan film industry, the late Agha G. A. Gul (1913 – 1983).

Aijaz, Riaz and Shahzad are the other sons of the late Agha G. A. Gul, the original owner and creator of Evernew Studios, on Multan Road, Lahore, Pakistan after the Independence of Pakistan in 1947. G. A. Gul is widely considered to be one of the pioneers of Pakistan film industry along with the film producers and studio owners, Shaukat Hussain Rizvi and Anwar Kamal Pasha.

== Career ==
Sajjad Gul owns the film production house Evernew Studios in Lahore and is the CEO of one of the media houses in Pakistan, Evernew Group. He is currently managing 8 companies: Evernew Concept (advertising agency), Evernew Entertainment (production company), Evernew Pictures, Evernew Studios, Evernew Carat, Evernew Solutions, Evernew Films and Evernew Music, which will launch soon. Apart from overseeing and managing the studio, Sajjad Gul has closely been linked to the development and growth of Pakistani cinema.

== Filmography ==
=== Producer ===
- Doorian (1984)
- International Gorillay (1990)
- Jo Darr Gya Woh Marr Gya (1995)
- Deewane Tere Pyar Ke (1998)
- No Paisa No Problem (2000)
- Tere Pyar Mein (2000)
- Chalo Ishq Larain (2002)

=== Director ===
- Chalo Ishq Larain (2002)

== Television drama serials ==
=== Producer ===
- Mehndi
- Chaandni Raatain
- Nestlé Nesvita Women of Strength '09
- Tum Kahan Hum Kahan
- Jiaa Naa Jaye
- Aik Raat Chand Si
- Aik Aur Kahani
- Na Tum Jano Na Hum Janein
- Thora Thora Pyar
- Woh Rishtey Woh Naatey
- Tumharay Liay
- Uraan
- Azar Ki Ayegi Baraat
- Dolly ki Ayegi Baraat
- Takkay ki Ayegi Baraat
- Annie Ki Ayegi Baraat
- Carte d'Or 'Meethi Si Lagan' Series
