= Zareen Panna =

Pakistani actress

- زرین پنہ
- Born: Zareen Nawab; 1947 (age 78–79); Shimla, British India
- Education: Islamia Girls College
- Occupations: Actress; Dancer
- Years active: 1952–present
- Spouse: S. Suleman (m. 1967; died 2021)
- Children: 5
- Parent: Nawab Khalil (father)
- Relatives: Santosh Kumar (brother-in-law); Darpan (brother-in-law); Sabiha Khanum (cousin); Nayyar Sultana (cousin); Mansoor (brother-in-law)
- Awards: Sitara-i-Imtiaz (1958); Pride of Performance (2018)

Zareen Panna, also known as Panna or Zarrin (Urdu; زرین; born 1947) is a Pakistani actress and former classical dancer. She has acted in both Urdu and Punjabi films.

== Early life ==
Zareen was born in 1947 in Shimla, British India. She along with her family migrated to Pakistan in Karachi. Zareen was interested in arts and dancing from a young age. Comedian Sultan Khoosat, father of actor Irfan Khoosat, was a friend of her family, he introduced her to Ghulam Hussain (Patiala Gharana) and Ustad Shado Maharaj (Dehli Gharana). They trained her in classical dancing and later Mukhtar Begum, sister of Farida Khanum, helped her in dancing and at that time she was taught by Rafi Anwar, Siddique Samrat and Madam Azuri.

Zareen attended a school to become a doctor to help her family. Her mother supported her decision to become a doctor because she wanted her to become one. She also took dancing classes, as she enjoyed dancing and decided to become a dancer. Later, Zareen attended Islamia Girls College in Karachi. From there, she completed her studies.

Zareen's father, Nawab Khalil, was an adviser in the court of Maharaja of Patiala and her mother was a housewife.

== Career ==
Zareen started as a child actress. She first did advertisements for leading brands of that time. After that, she learned Bharatanatyam, Khattak and Kathakali dancing. She achieving national and international recognition at a very young age and in 1958, she was awarded Sitara-i-Imtiaz by the President of Pakistan Ayub Khan. In 1960, she made her debut as an actress in 1960 in the film Gharib and had a successful career. She worked in multiple films, such as Insaan Badalta Hai, Lakhon Fasanay, Sukh Ka Sapna, Insaan Badalta Hai and Taj Aur Talwar. She also performed in front of Pakistan President Iskander Mirza, appreciating her and also doing live performances in front of former prime ministers Feroz Khan Noon and Zulfikar Ali Bhutto. In 1959, she also did a performance for President of United States Dwight D. Eisenhower during his visit to Pakistan at The Palace Hotel.

In 1961, she did a classical performance for Queen Elizabeth II when she visited Pakistan with her husband Prince Philip.

She was invited by former prime minister Feroz Khan Noon to perform in front of King of Afghanistan Mohammed Zahir Shah. When president Sukarno visited Pakistan in 1963, she performed a live dance show for him.

She also went to China, performing in the Palace of Mao Zedong. She also went to Russia, participating in a cultural festival at Moscow.

In 2018, she a did a live dance performance for prince Aga Khan IV when he visited Pakistan. For her contributions towards the television and film industry, she was honored by the Government of Pakistan with the Pride of Performance in 2018.

== Personal life ==
In the 1960s, Zareen married actor and film director S. Suleman, brother of actors Santosh Kumar, Mansoor and Darpan. She was a close relative of actresses Sabiha Khanum and Nayyar Sultana. She has five children, including three sons and two daughters. After 25 years, she and S. Suleman separated, but they did not divorce and she kept custody of their children.

== Filmography ==
=== Film ===
Year	Film	Language
1960	Gharib	Urdu
1961	Insan Badalta Hai	Urdu
1961	Taj Aur Talwar	Urdu
1961	Gul Bakavli	Urdu
1961	Sher-e-Islam	Urdu
1961	Gulfam	Urdu
1961	Lakhon Fasanay	Urdu
1962	Sukh Ka Sapna	Urdu
1962	Darwaza	Urdu
1962	Azra	Urdu
1962	Inqilab	Urdu
1962	Qaidi	Urdu
1962	Bulbul-e-Baghdad	Urdu
1962	Zarina	Urdu
1962	Anchal	Urdu
1962	Ek Manzil 2 Rahen	Urdu
1963	Mouj Mela	Punjabi
1963	Baghawat	Urdu
1963	Qanoon	Urdu
1963	Yahudi Ki Larki	Urdu
1963	Baji	Urdu
1963	Choorian	Urdu
1963	Sazish	Urdu
1963	Teer Andaz	Urdu
1963	Seema	Urdu
1963	Ik Tera Sahara	Urdu
1963	Tangay Wala	Urdu
1963	Maa Beti	Urdu
1963	Aurat Ek Kahani	Urdu
1964	Baap Ka Baap	Urdu
1964	Touba	Urdu
1964	Shikari	Urdu
1964	Inspector	Urdu
1964	Ishrat	Urdu
1964	Jhalak	Urdu
1964	Shabab	Urdu
1964	Pyar Ki Saza	Urdu
1964	Phool Aur Kantay	Urdu
1964	Deevana	Urdu
1964	Haveli	Urdu
1964	Baghi Sipahi	Urdu
1964	Landa Bazar	Urdu
1965	Sartaj	Urdu
1965	Tamasha	Urdu
1967	Bahadur	Urdu
1967	Zinda Laash	Urdu
1968	Pakeeza	Urdu
1969	Neela Parbat	Urdu
1969	Langotia	Punjabi
1969	Dhol Sipahi	Punjabi
1970	Payel	Bengali / Urdu

== Awards and recognition ==
Year	Award	Category	Result	Title	Ref.
1958	Sitara-i-Imtiaz	Awarded by the President of Pakistan	Won	Herself	
2018	Pride of Performance	Awarded by the President of Pakistan	Won	Herself	
