= Mushtaq Gazdar =

Pakistani cinematographer and film historian (1940-2000)

- Born: 1937; Karachi, British India
- Died: 15 November 2000 (aged 62–63); Karachi, Pakistan
- Occupations: Cinematographer; Documentary film maker Film historian
- Known for: Publishing the book Pakistan Cinema (1947-1997); Founding member of the Human Rights Commission of Pakistan
- Awards: Pride of Performance Award in 1992; Won 2 Nigar Awards during his career

Mushtaq Gazdar (Urdu: مشتاق گزدر) (1937 – 15 November 2000) was a Pakistani film maker and cinematographer, who scripted, directed and produced around 190 short feature films, documentary films and newsreels on subjects including poverty-stricken women, especially those abused, bought and sold in open flesh markets, as well as helpless children.

He was also a founding member of the Human Rights Commission of Pakistan.

He also "scripted, directed and produced more than 175 short feature films, documentaries, and newsreels in the 1970s-1990s".

== Early life and career ==
Mushtaq Gazdar was born in 1937 in Karachi. He completed his MSc in physics from the University of Karachi. He held diplomas in film-making technique from London and Tokyo, and founded a production house in Karachi. He also worked as production assistant for a UK-based TV film mini-series, the Emmy Award winner Traffik (1989).

He was a founding member of the Human Rights Commission of Pakistan. Mushtaq Gazdar also wrote articles on social issues for newspapers. Mushtaq personally had politically progressive ideology and associated with people like Faiz Ahmed Faiz, Sibte Hassan and Dorab Patel.

He also wrote a voluminous book Pakistani Cinema: 1947-1997, a historical and critical study of Pakistan's film industry, published in 1997 to commemorate Pakistan's 50th anniversary. Before he suddenly died on 15 November 2000, he was elected the honorary secretary of the Pakistan Arts Council, Karachi.

== Family ==
Mushtaq Gazdar was married to Saeeda Gazdar, a short story writer and a poet, and together they had a son and a daughter. His daughter, Aisha Gazdar, worked with her father and became a short documentary film maker in Pakistan in 2010.

== Books ==
- Pakistan Cinema (1947-1997) by Mushtaq Gazdar (published in 1997, Oxford University Press)

== Awards and recognition ==
- Pride of Performance Award by the President of Pakistan in 1992
- Won 2 Nigar Awards for his short documentary films
- Won the grand prize at the Tampere International Film Festival in Finland for his docudrama 'They are killing the horse'
