= Himayat Ali Shair =

Urdu poet and writer (1926–2019)

- Born: 14 July 1926; Aurangabad, Hyderabad Deccan, British India
- Died: 15 July 2019 (aged 93); Toronto, Canada
- Occupations: Poet, Film songs lyricist
- Awards: Pride of Performance by the President of Pakistan in 2002; Presidential Iqbal Award by the President of Pakistan in 1984

Himayat Ali Shair (Urdu: حمایت علی شاعر; 14 July 1926 – 15 July 2019) was an Urdu poet, writer, film songwriter, actor and radio drama artist from Pakistan.

He received the 2002 Pride of Performance Award for his literary services in Urdu literature from the president of Pakistan. He also received two Nigar Awards in 1962 and 1963 for 'Best Song Lyricist' for Pakistani films Aanchal (1962) and Daman (1963).

== Early life and education ==
Himayat Ali Shair was born in Aurangabad, Hyderabad Deccan, British India on 14 July 1926. His mother died when he was three years old. At a very young age, he was exposed to the leading leftist writers of that time. He did his master's degree in Urdu from the University of Sindh at Jamshoro, Pakistan.

== Career ==
Himayat Ali Shair worked for All India Radio before migrating to Pakistan in 1951 to begin his career with Radio Pakistan in Karachi. His first poetry collection "Aag Main Phool" was published in 1956 and received the Presidential Award in 1958. Later, he started a successful career as a film songs lyricist, receiving Nigar Awards for the films Aanchal (1962) and Daaman (1963). In 1966, Shair produced and directed the film Lori (lit. lullaby) starring Muhammad Ali, Zeba and Santosh Kumar.

Shair wrote the first few evergreen songs in the cinema of Pakistan. Some of the songs include Na Chura Sakogay Daaman, Jaag Utha Hai Sara Watan, Khudawanda Yeh Kaisi Aag, Jab Raat Dhali, Har Qadam Per Nit Naye Sanchay Main Dhal Jatay Hain Log, Tujh Ko Maloom Naheen, Tujh Ko Kya Maloom and many others.

His collection of poetry includes "Mitti Ka Qarz," "Tashnagi Ka Safar," "Haroon Ki Awaz," which received Allama Dr. Muhammad Iqbal Award and "Harf Harf Roshni." Shair is the only poet in Urdu literary history who wrote an autobiography titled "Aaina Sar Aaina." Over 400 pages, the autobiography is composed of as many as 3,500 couplets. In 2007, he published a collection of all of his poetry as "Kuliyat-e-Shair".

Himayat Ali Shair's research work for Pakistan Television titled Aqeedat ka safar (700 years of Na'at poetry) has also been published. Another series shed valuable light on 50 years of Naat poetry in Pakistan. His other TV programmes included Ghazal uss nay chheri (700 years of Urdu poetry), Khushboo ka safar (500 years of regional poets' Urdu poetry), Mohabbaton kay safeer (500 years of Sindhi poets' Urdu poetry) and Lub aazad (40 years of agitational poetry).

In 1976, he joined Sindh University as an associate Professor of Urdu Literature on the insistence of his friend and poet Shaikh Ayaz. He taught Urdu at this university from 1976 to 1987. He then retired from this job and chose to devote himself to literary pursuits. He quit the film industry as his children grew older, due to the fact that the film industry was not considered a respectable institute. In his words: “Besides, my wife had been insisting that I switch to some 'decent' profession, even if it is a low-paid one, as she feared the grown-up children might follow in my footsteps and enter the film world. Her fears were not unfounded as one day I also observed my son Roshan Khayal, a university student then, sporting well-known actor Mohammad Ali's hairdo."

On 27 March 2010, a literary evening was organized in Hyderabad, Sindh by Kamaluddin Memorial Society in honor of Shair. The Vice-Chancellor of Sindh University, Dr. Nazir A. Mughal announced the establishment of "Himayat Ali Shair Chair" in recognition of his services to literature. He also announced five scholarships of Rs 5,000 each per month for research on literary contributions of Himayat Ali Shair for M.Phil/PhD degrees. A resolution was adopted on the occasion called for naming a road in the city after Himayat Ali Shair.

== Personal life ==
Himayat Ali Shair married Meraj Naseem in 1949; they were together for 52 years, until his wife died in Toronto, Ontario, Canada of liver cancer. She is buried in Pickering, Ontario, Canada where their children live.

Himayat Ali Shair spent most of his time in Pakistan and Canada where his children live and frequently visited his hometown in India, where his siblings reside.

== Filmography ==
Himayat Ali Shair wrote film songs for the following Pakistani films:

- Aanchal (1962)
- Jab Se Dekha Hai Tumhein (1962)
- Daaman (1963)
- Dil Ne Tujhe Maan Liya
- Ek Tera Sahara (1963)
- Khamosh Raho (1964)
- Kaneez (1965 film)
- Naila (1965) (Himayat Ali Shair wrote only one song for this popular film, the rest were written by Qateel Shifai)
- Mujahid (1965)
- Lori (1966) [wrote a highly popular lori (lullaby song) for this film]
- Tasveer (1966)
- Wali-Ehad (1968)

== List of works/bibliography ==
- An Kahi (a short story)
- Aag Mein Phool (this collection of poetry won him a Presidential Award in 1959)
- Shikast-e-Aarzoo
- Mitti Ka Qarz (poetry)
- Harf Harf Roshani (poetry)

== Awards and recognition ==
- Pride of Performance Award by the President of Pakistan in 2002
- Nigar Award for film Aanchal (1962) and Daaman (1963) as 'Best Film Song Lyricist'
- Makhdoom Mohiuddin International Award in Delhi, India in 1989
- Life Achievement Award in Washington in 2001
- Presidential Iqbal Award by the President of Pakistan in 1984
- Naqoosh Award

== Death ==
Himayat Ali Shair died in Toronto, Canada on 15 July 2019 at age 93. He reportedly suffered a heart attack. Among his survivors are his eight children, four boys including Roshan Khayal, Auje Kamal who live in Canada now, and four girls.
