= Inayat Hussain (composer) =

Pakistani film composer (1916 - 1993)

Master Inayat Hussain
- ماسٹر عِنایَت حُسَین
- Born: Inayat Hussain; 1916; Lahore, Punjab, British India
- Died: 26 March 1993 at age 76; Lahore, Punjab, Pakistan
- Occupations: Music composer for Pakistani films Music composer for ghazals and Nazms on Radio Pakistan and Pakistani television
- Years active: 1946 – 1985
- Awards: 2 Nigar Awards (1965) and (1975)

Master Inayat Hussain (Punjabi, Urdu: ماسٹر عِنایَت حُسَین; 1916 – 26 March 1993) was a Pakistani film music composer.

== Early life and career ==
Inayat Hussain was born in the Bhati Gate area of Lahore in 1916. He also lived in the Lohari Gate, Lahore area in the mid-1980s. After receiving some basic education, he became a formal student of Ustad Bade Ghulam Ali Khan of Patiala gharana for learning the traditional classical music. He learned to play harmonium and other musical instruments in his youth. In the early part of his career, he worked in several theatrical organisations in Calcutta and Bombay in British India, both as a singer and as an actor. Having won some recognition in the music world, he worked as a Court Singer to the Nawab of Rampur for a short time.

Later, for nine years, he worked as a music composer for Columbia Gramophone Recording Company and for His Master's Voice music labels. He also had the opportunity to work with the then renowned singers Roshan Ara Begum, Zeenat Begum and Malika Pukhraj both at All India Radio and later at Radio Pakistan.

He composed music for nearly 65 films, starting with the Punjabi-language film Kamli (1946) before independence of Pakistan in 1947. His first film in Pakistan was Hichkolay (1949). In 1950, he got a breakthrough with his first super-hit song in film Shammi (1950) which was produced by the famous ghazal singer Malika Pukhraj. Next opportunity for recognition came with the popularity of a song in film Gumnaam (1954) that was written by Saifuddin Saif, Payal Mein Geet Hain Chhumm Chhumm Ke. And the next year in 1955, he even got attention from a highly-recognized personality in the Indian subcontinent in the field of classical music Amir Khan who made a special stopover in Lahore on his way back from his scheduled Afghanistan tour, just to meet him in Lahore and compliment him in person for composing the film song Ulfat Ki Nai Manzil Ko Chala for Anwar Kamal Pasha's film Qatil (1955), lyrics written by Qateel Shifai and skillfully sung by Iqbal Bano under his music direction.

It was an achievement having recognition from an authority in the music field for a newcomer. He ended up becoming a leading film composer of Pakistan and composed music for nearly 65 films from 1949 to 1985.

== Popular hit songs ==
All the songs listed below had music by Master Inayat Hussain:

Song	Singer	Song lyrics by	Film year and notes
Dolay Re Mann Haulay Haulay	Roshan Ara Begum		All India Radio production (1944)
"Suhe Chooray Waliye, Tu Ik Baar Aaja"	Inayat Hussain Bhatti	Tufail Hoshiarpuri	Shammi (1950) - his first hit song in Pakistan film producer Malika Pukhraj
"Payal Mein Geet Hain Chhumm Chhumm Ke"	Iqbal Bano	adapted by Saifuddin Saif based on earlier poem by Hakim Ahmad Shuja	Gumnaam (1954) film producer Agha G. A. Gul film director Anwar Kamal Pasha
"Ulfat Ki Nai Manzil Ko Chala, Tu Baanhain Daal Ke Baanhon Mein"	Iqbal Bano	Qateel Shifai	Qatil (1955) - film director Anwar Kamal Pasha
"O' Mayna, Na Jaanay Kya Ho Gaya, Kahan Dil Kho Gaya"	Kausar Parveen	Qateel Shifai	Qatil (1955)
"Ik Pal Bhi Nahin Araam Yahan, Dukh Dard Ke Laakh Bahanay Hain"	Iqbal Bano	Qateel Shifai	Aankh ka Nasha (1957)
"Kahan Tak Suno Gay, Kahan Tak Sunaoon; Hazaron Hee Shikway, Kya Kya Bataoon"	Noor Jehan	Tanvir Naqvi	Anarkali (1958), he composed music for 3 of its film songs Remaining film songs were composed by Rasheed Attre
"Jaan-e-Baharan Rashk-e-Chaman"	Saleem Raza	Tanvir Naqvi	Azra (1962) Also worth mentioning here that Inayat Hussain had earlier introduced Saleem Raza as a singer in his earlier film Qatil (1955).
"Kuchh Bhi Na Kaha, Aur Keh Bhi Gaye"	Noor Jehan	Tufail Hoshiarpuri	Azra (1962)
"Ae Dil Kisi Ki Yaad Mein Hota Hai Beqarar Kyun"	Saleem Raza	Qateel Shifai	Ik Tera Sahara (1963)
"Baadalon Mein Chhup Raha Hai Chaand Kyun"	Saleem Raza and Nasim Begum	Qateel Shifai	Ik Tera Sahara (1963)
"Ghanghore Ghata Chhaai Hai"	Nasim Begum	Qateel Shifai	Ik Tera Sahara (1963)
"Dil Deta Hai Ro Ro Duhai, Kisi Se Koi Pyar Na Kare"	Mala	Qateel Shifai	Ishq Par Zor Nahin (1963)
"Ae Dharti Panj Daryanwan Di"; A song about the land of Punjab	Alam Lohar	Tanvir Naqvi	Laeey Lag (1964)
"Chunni Kesri Te Gotay Diyyan Dhaarian"; A Punjabi wedding song	Mala, Naheed Niazi and Irene Perveen	Tanvir Naqvi	Laeey Lag (1964)
"Dil Ke Veeranay Mein Ik Shama Hai Roshan Kab Se"	Mala and Masood Rana	Himayat Ali Shair	Naila (1965)
"Mujhe Arzoo Thi Jis Ki Who Payaam Aa Gaya Hai"	Mala	Qateel Shifai	Naila (1965); Master Inayat Hussain had 4 hit film songs in Naila (1965)
"Gham-e-Deil Ko In Aankhon Se Chhalak Jana Bhi Aata Hai"	Mala	Qateel Shifai	Naila
"Ab Thandi Aanhein Bhar Pagli, Jaa Aur Muhabbat Kar Pagli"	Mala	Qateel Shifai	Naila (1965)
Kiya Hai Jo Pyar Tau Parey Ga Nibhana, Rakh Diya Qadamon Mein Dil Nazrana, Qabool Kar Lo	Mala and Ahmed Rushdi	Qateel Shifai	Dil Mera Dharkan Teri (1968)
"Gulab Ki Si Patti Kichhore Ka Makhana; Dekho Meri Jaan Bani Hai Moti Dana"	Mala Begum and others	Qateel Shifai	Paakdaman (1969)
"Ham Se Badal Gaya Woh Nigahein Tau Kya Hua; Zinda Hain Kitne Log Muhabbat Kiye Baghair"	Mehdi Hassan	Qateel Shifai	Dil-e-Betab (1969)
"Ya Apna Kisay Nuun Karle, Ya Aap Kise Da Ho Bailiya"	Masood Rana	Hazin Qadri	Dil Diyan Laggian (1970)
"Agar Mein Bata Doon Meray Dil Mein Kya Hai; Tau Mujh Se Nigahein Chura Tau Na Lo Gay"	Runa Laila	Qateel Shifai	Aansoo Ban Gaye Moti (1970)
"Tarrak Tarrak Taali Wajdi Ae"	Noor Jehan	Hazin Qadri	Challenge (1974)
"Asaan Maan Watanaan Da Rakhna Ae"	Masood Rana	Hazin Qadri	Chitra Te Shera (1976)
"Udd Ja Ni Hawaey Meri Chunni Na Urra"	Noor Jehan	Ahmad Rahi	Jabroo (1977)
"Jee Karda Ae Mein Dig Paan Dharram Karke"	Afshan	Hazin Qadri	Jabroo (1977)
"Jay Munda Howay Haan Da"	Afshan and Mehnaz Begum	Ahmad Rahi	Jabroo (1977)
"Ae Tay Horr Ghandhan Haun Giyyan Pakkian; Tay Jhinnan Tuun Zore Laayen Ga"	Noor Jehan	Nasim Fazal	Maula Jatt (1979)
"Ae Tay Waela Aap Dassay Ga; Kaun Marda Maidan Pae Ne Hullay"	Alam Lohar and Shaukat Ali	Nasim Fazal	Maula Jatt (1979)
"Rehmat Da Meenh Paa Khudaya"	Inayat Hussain Bhatti	Sufi Mian Muhammad Bakhsh (1830-1907)	Taaqat (1984)

== Music as a family tradition ==
Master Inayat Hussain had two younger brothers – Master Abdullah (1930 – 31 January 1994) who was also a noted film music composer in Pakistan and then the youngest brother Akhtar Hussain Akhiyan of Punjabi hit film Paatay Khan (1955) fame. In fact, Master Inayat Hussain came from a family with a strong music tradition called 'Mozang Gharana' that also included a cousin and another Pakistani film music composer, Ustad Tafu. One of his nephews M. Ashraf (1 February 1942 – 4 February 2007) was also a successful film music composer from the 1960s to the 1990s.

== Awards and recognition ==
- Nigar Award for Best Music in film Naila (1965)
- Nigar Award for Best Music in Punjabi-language film Jadoo (1975)

== Death ==
Inayat Hussain died on 26 March 1993 at age 76 at his hometown, Lahore, Pakistan and was laid to rest at Miani Sahib Graveyard, Lahore.
