= Agha G. A. Gul =

Film producer from Pakistan

Agha G. A. Gul (19 February 1913 – 6 September 1983) is widely considered to be one of the pioneers of cinema in Pakistan. He also was the founder and owner of the Evernew Studios in Lahore, Pakistan.

== Career ==
Gul was born in Peshawar, British India on 19 February 1913. Agha G. A. Gul remains one of the towering figures of Pakistani film industry in its early years along with film producers Shaukat Hussain Rizvi, Anwar Kamal Pasha and W. Z. Ahmed. He also laid the foundations of his 'Evernew Studios' which provided the film making facilities in Pakistan's early days.

== Filmography ==
=== As a film producer ===
- Mundri (1949)
- Gumnaam (1954)
- Qatil (1955)
- Dulla Bhatti (1956) (A hit film which earned him so much money that he was able to buy Evernew Studios with it)
- Lakht-e-Jigar (1956)
- Naghma-e-Dil (1959)
- Mehboob (1962)
- Qaidi (1962)
- Azra (1962)
- Mauj Mela (1963)
- Ik Tera Sahara (1963)
- Daachi (1964)
- Naila (1965) [This film won 7 Nigar Awards - producer: Agha G. A. Gul]
- Payal Ki Jhankar (1966)
- Salam-e-Mohabbat (1971)
- Sangdil (1982) ['Best Film of 1982' - A film produced by Agha G. A. Gul]

== Death and legacy ==
Agha G. A. Gul died in London, England on 6 September 1983 at age 70. His two sons, Sajjad Gul and Shehzad Gul, continued his work in the Pakistani film industry after his death.
