= Mala Begum =

Pakistani singer (1942–1990)

- مالا بیگم
- Born: Naseem Nazli; 9 November 1942; Faisalabad, Punjab, British India
- Died: 5 March 1990 (aged 47); Lahore, Punjab, Pakistan
- Other names: Princess Mala Begum; Mala
- Occupations: Ghazal singer; film playback singer
- Years active: 1961–1990
- Spouse: Muhammad Ashiq Butt (divorced)
- Children: 1
- Relatives: Shamim Nazli (sister)
- Awards: Nigar Award for Best Playback Singer (1962); Nigar Award for Best Playback Singer (1965)

Naseem Begum (Punjabi, Urdu: نسِیم نازلی; 9 November 1942 – 5 March 1990), known professionally as Mala (Urdu: مالا), was a Pakistani playback singer of Urdu and Punjabi films.

In the 1960s, Mala was one-half of the 'hit pair for singing duet film songs' with famous playback singer Ahmed Rushdi and they gave numerous hits to Pakistan film industry. She was also called Princess Mala Begum as she provided the singing voice for actresses who portrayed roles of royal and upper-class families in films. She sang many popular film songs during a singing career spanning almost three decades in the 1960s, 1970s, and 1980s.

== Early life ==
Mala's given name was Naseem Begum. She was born on 9 November 1942 in Faisalabad, Punjab. She was the younger sister of music composer Shamim Nazli.

== Career ==
Mala was interested in singing and music from a young age. Her elder sister Shamim Nazli happened to be her first music teacher and Naseem learned the basics of music from her. On her sister's request, music composer, Baba Ghulam Ahmed Chishti recorded two songs for the Punjabi film Aabroo (1961) in Mala's voice. However, the film flopped. Despite the fact that her elder sister got her a break in films, it was the film producer Anwar Kamal Pasha who persuaded Naseem to try her luck and not give up on the Pakistani film industry. Her first hit in films came in 1962. She changed her name to Mala and sang a simple Urdu composition, Aaya re dekho for the film Sooraj Mukhi (1962). The music was composed by Master Abdullah. In 1962, Mala rendered her voice to a tragic Urdu composition, Dil daeta hai ro ro duhai, kisi sey koi pyaar na karey for the film Ishq Par Zor Nahin (1962). The music was composed by Master Inayat Hussain and the song was picturised on actress Yasmin and this film song ended up being a popular song of 1962. The film song lyrics were written by Qateel Shifai.

Additionally, Mala's greatest accomplishment was the film song 'Akele Na Jaana' in the film Armaan (1966 film). Mala teamed up with music director Sohail Rana and film songs writer Masroor Anwar.
Besides Urdu language film songs, she also sang many memorable popular film songs for films in the Punjabi language.

== Personal life ==
Mala married twice but both of her marriages failed miserably. She had a daughter from husband Muhammad Ashiq Butt who was a film producer and she named her daughter after her musical iconic film, Naila.

== Death ==
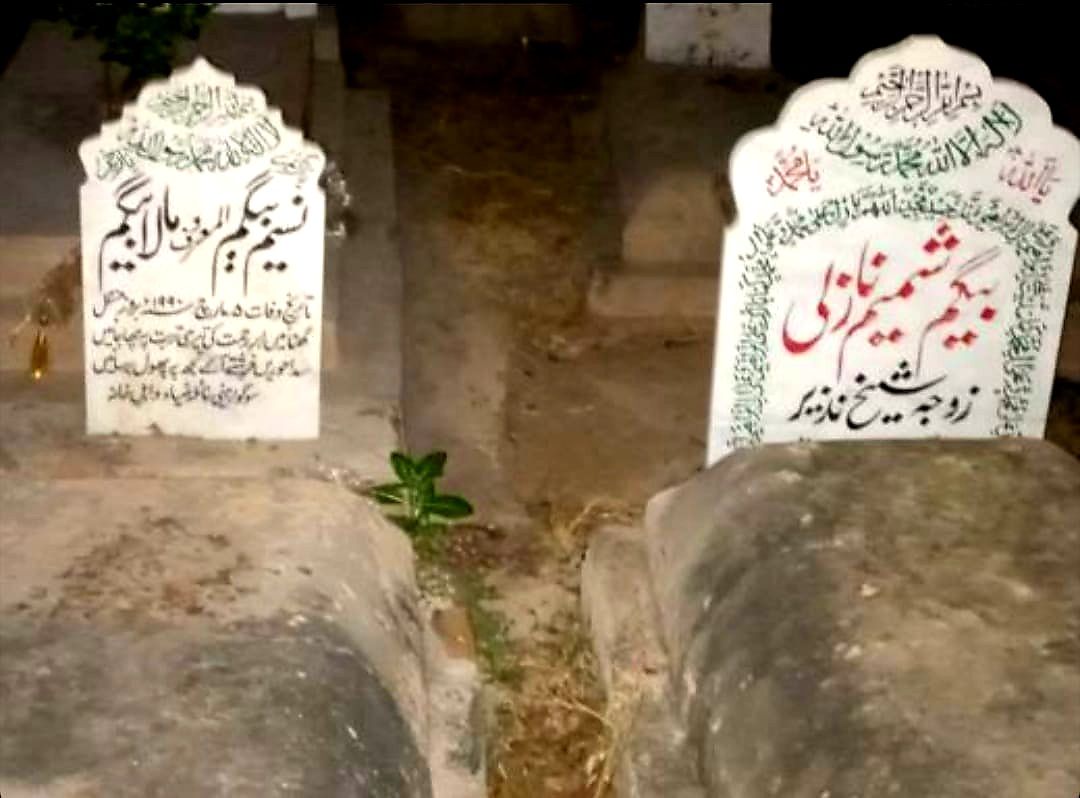
Gravestones of Mala and her sister Shamim Nazli at Miani Sahib Cemetery, Lahore

Mala died on 5 March 1990 and was laid to rest at Miani Sahib Graveyard, Lahore. Later her sister was also buried near her grave.

== Popular film songs ==
- "Sapnon mein urri urri jaaoon", Sung by Mala, lyrics by Qateel Shifai, music by Rasheed Attre in film Mehboob (1962)
- "Dil deta hai ro ro duhai kisi se koi pyar na kare", Sung by Sain Akhtar Hussain and Mala, lyrics by Qateel Shifai, music by Master Inayat Hussain in film Ishq Par Zor Nahin (1962)
- "Mein nein tau pareet nibhai, saanwaria re nikla tu harjai", Sung by Mala, lyrics by Himayat Ali Shair, music by Khalil Ahmed in film Khamosh Raho (1964)
- "Taangay walia sawari aan mein teray haan dee", Sung by Mala, lyrics by Hazeen Qadri, music by Ghulam Ahmed Chishti in film Daachi (1964)
- "Jaa re bedardi tu nein kahin ka hamein na chhorra", Sung by Mala, lyrics by Fayyaz Hashmi, music by A. Hamid in film Ashiana (1964)
- "Chunni kaisri tay gottay dian dhaarian", Sung by Mala, Naheed Niazi and Irene Perveen, lyrics by Tanvir Naqvi, music by Master Inayat Hussain in film Lai Lag (1964)
- "Reham karo ya shah-e-do-aalam" Sung by Mala, lyrics by Fayyaz Hashmi, music by A. Hamid in film Eid Mubarak (1965)
- "Chhadd challi babula terian mein gallian", Sung by Mala, lyrics by Hazeen Qadri, music by Master Abdullah in film Malangi (1965)
- "Ballay ballay wai lokaan paahnay phull uddia", Sung by Mala and others, lyrics by Hazeen Qadri, music by Master Abdullah in film Malangi (1965)
- "Mujhe arzoo thi jiski who paigham aa gaya hai", Sung by Mala, lyrics by Qateel Shifai, music by Master Inayat Hussain in film Naila (1965)
- "Gham-e-dil ko inn aankhon sey chhalak jana bhi aata hai", Sung by Mala, lyrics by Qateel Shifai, music by Master Inayat Hussain in film Naila (1965)
- "Dil ke veraanay mein ik shama hai roshan kab se", Sung by Mala, lyrics by Himayat Ali Shair, music by Master Inayat Hussain in film Naila (1965)
- "Ab thandi aahein bhar pagli, jaa aur mohabbat kar pagli", Sung by Mala, lyrics by Qateel Shifai, music by Master Inayat Hussain in film Naila (1965)
- "Saaz-e-dil chhaira hai humne, hukam tha kuchh gaaeay" Sung by Mala, lyrics by Qateel Shifai, music by Safdar Hussain in film Pardah (1966)
- "Yeh samaan pyaara pyaara, yeh hawaain thandi thandi", Sung by Mala, lyrics and music by Bashir Ahmed or (B. A. Deep) in film Darshan (1967)
- "Shama ka shola bharak raha hai", Sung by Mala, lyrics by Mushir Kazmi, music by Nisar Bazmi in film Aadil (1966)
- "Akelay na jaana hamein chorr kar", Sung by Mala, lyrics by Masroor Anwar, music by Sohail Rana in film Armaan (1966)
- "Chanda se milnay chali hai chakori", Sung by Mala and Firdausi Begum, lyrics by Akhtar Yousuf, music by Robin Ghosh in film Chakori (1967)
- "Ni lang jaana assaan dilaan te paer dhar ke", Sung by Mala, lyrics by Ahmad Rahi, music by Rehman Verma in film Sassi Punnun (1968)
- "Tujhay piyar ki qasam hai", Sung by Masood Rana/Mala, lyrics by Suroor Barabankvi, music by Karim Shahabuddin in film Chand Aur Chandni (1968)
- "Mohey aaii na jag se laaj, mein itna zor se naachi aaj, ke ghunghroo tuut gai", Sung by Mala, lyrics by Qateel Shifai, music by Nisar Bazmi in film Naaz (1969)
- "Kisne torra hai dil hazoor ka", Sung by Mala, lyrics by Khawaja Pervez, music by Kamal Ahmad in film Rangeela (1970)
- "Chalo kahin duur, yeh samaj chorr dein", Sung by Mala and Mehdi Hassan, lyrics by Habib Jalib, music by A. Hamid in film Samaaj (1974)

== Awards and recognition ==
Year	Award	Category	Result	Title	Ref.
1962	Nigar Award	Best Playback Singer	Won	Ishq Par Zor Nahin	
1965	Nigar Award	Best Playback Singer	Won	Naila	

== See also ==
- Shamim Nazli
