= Iqbal Bano =

Pakistani classical and ghazal singer

Iqbal Bano PP
- اِقبال بانو
- Iqbal Bano
- Born: 28 August 1928; Delhi, British India
- Died: 21 April 2009 (aged 80); Lahore, Punjab, Pakistan
- Other name: The Queen of Ghazal
- Occupation: Singer
- Years active: 1939 – 2009
- Style: Ghazal • Thumri • Dadra • Khayal
- Children: 3
- Awards: Pride of Performance (1974)

Iqbal Bano (Urdu: اِقبال بانو; born 1928 in Delhi – died 21 April 2009 in Lahore) was a Pakistani singer who specialized in ghazal. She is popularly known by her honorific title Malika-e-Ghazal (The Queen of Ghazal) in both Pakistan and India. She was known for her semi-classical Urdu ghazal songs and classical thumris, but also sang easy-listening numbers in films in the 1950s. In 1974, she became the recipient of the Pride of Performance award.

== Early life ==
Iqbal Bano was born in 1928 in Delhi, British India. From a young age, she developed a love for music. It was a crucial moment of her life when her friend's father told Bano's father, "My daughters do sing reasonably well, but Iqbal Bano is especially blessed in singing. She will become a big name if you begin her training." Her father allowed her to study music. She spent her childhood years in Rohtak near Delhi.

In Delhi, she studied under Ustad Sabri Khan and Ustad Chaand Khan of the Delhi gharana, an expert in all kinds of pure classical and light classical forms of vocal music.

He instructed her in pure classical music and light classical music within the framework of classical forms of thumri and dadra. She was duly initiated Ganda-bandh shagird (formally initiated disciple; Ganda-bandh is a traditional knot-tying-ceremony which cements the relationship between guru and student) of her Ustad (teacher).

== Career ==
Ustad Chaand Khan referred her to All India Radio, Delhi, where she sang on the radio and recorded her first songs. In 1948, aged 21, she migrated to Pakistan and also married into a land-owning family in Multan, Pakistan. She moved to Multan with her husband who promised her that he would never try to stop her from singing, but would rather encourage and promote her. In her earlier career Iqbal Bano collaborated with well known lyricists such as the poets Saifuddin Saif and Qateel Shifai and composers such as Master Inayat Hussain and Rasheed Attre. She had become a 'singing star' by the 1950s, singing soundtrack songs for famous Pakistani Urdu films like Payal Mein Geet Hai Cham Cham Ke (film Gumnaam, 1954), Ulfat ki Nai Manzil ko Chala (Qatil, 1955), Chhor Hamen Kis Des Sudharay Sayyan Hamaray and Dono Dillon Peh Hua Ulfat Ka Asar (Inteqaam, 1955), Taaron Ka Bhi Tu Maalik (Sarfarosh, 1956), Pareshan Raat Sari Hai (Ishq-e-Laila, 1957), and Ambva ki Darrion pe Jhoolana Jhoolae Ja (Nagin, 1959). Iqbal Bano was later invited by Radio Pakistan for classical performances on the radio. Her debut public concert took place in 1957, at the Lahore Arts Council.

Throughout her musical career she also appeared on Pakistan Television programs in addition to conducting concerts. By 1970s, Iqbal Bano had achieved fame as a popular artist and her stature had grown in the Pakistani cultural community as an accomplished ghazal singer for which she was critically acclaimed by her artist peers. An example of this was seen in a memorable concert in a television program called 'Nikhar' in the early 1970s; in the recordings of this program numerous literary and musical artists of Pakistan such as Hafeez Jalandhari, Ahmed Faraz, Amjad Islam Amjad, Kishwar Naheed, Ashfaq Ahmed and Nayyara Noor could be seen in the audience.

Her husband died in 1980, after which she moved to Lahore from Multan. Many music critics observed that her temperament was particularly suited to vocal genres like thumri, dadra, and ghazal. According to BBC News website, "Few singers of classical music matched the brilliance of her voice and her command over musical notes".

== Ghazal specialist ==
Iqbal Bano is regarded as an accomplished ghazal singer around the world who took the sub-continental ghazal singing to new heights and has been called the "Queen of Ghazal". Her repertoire include ghazals of numerous poets, including Mirza Ghalib (Muddat Hoi Hai Yaar Ko), Quli Qutub Shah (Piya Baaj Piyala, Piya Baaj Jaay Na), Baqi Siddiqui (Daagh e Dil Humko Yaad Anay Lagay), Daagh Dehlvi (Tere Wade Ko - Daag), Nasir Kazmi (Kuchh To Ehsas-e-Ziyan Tha Pahle) and Ahmed Faraz (Ranjish Hi Sahi). However, in her later career she was recognized particularly for singing ghazals of Faiz Ahmed Faiz, a Lenin Prize-winning poet, such as Aaiye Haath Uthaen, Mere Dil Mere Musafir, Yeh Mausam-e-Gul, Rang Pairahan Ka, Na Ganwao Nawak-e-Neem Kash, Dono Jahan Teri Mohobbat Mein Haar Ke amongst others; her rendition of Faiz Ahmad Faiz's Dasht-e-Tanhai Mein has become a timeless classic. In addition to Urdu, she also sang in Saraiki, Punjabi and Persian, the latter introducing her to audiences outside the sub-continent in Iran and Afghanistan. In pre-1979 Afghanistan, she was often invited to the annual cultural fair, the Jashn-e-Kabul.

In light classical, her presentation of Thumris in Raag Khamaj (Kaahe Sataye Mohey), Raag Tilak Kamod (Sautan Ghar Na Ja), Raag Des (Nahin Pare Mohe Chain), Raag Pilu (Gori Tore Naina Kajar Bin Kaare) and other such renderings have become classics. Iqbal Bano was well known for her versatility as a singer and vocalist; she was not only at ease with classical, light-classical, film and popular music but also rendered her classical training to folk songs.

Music lovers noted some similarities between Iqbal Bano and Begum Akhtar, especially some marked resemblances in their styles of singing. Bano's recitals stuck to a classical style that lays more stress on the raag purity.

== Defiance and activism ==
Although Iqbal Bano was not directly involved in politics or political campaigning, she made an effective protest that has gone down in history as an iconic symbol of resistance and as legend. From 1977 to 1988 Pakistan was under the military dictatorship headed by General Muhammad Zia-ul-Haq. By 1986 Zia’s regime was in full swing with severe curtailment and abuses of basic human rights, so much so that various restriction were placed on what clothing could be worn by public figures, particularly women. One such curtailment of basic human rights was the banning of the sari, a common attire for women of all religions in many countries in the sub-continent, as un-Islamic.

Iqbal Bano had worn sari for decades and appeared in concerts, radio and television programs and was famous for rendering the poetry of Faiz Ahmad Faiz. Not long after Zia's regime issued the edict that sari was to be banned from the public sphere, Iqbal Bano donned a black sari and appeared at the Al-Hamra hall in Lahore, Pakistan on 13 February 1986 in front of a large audience. This was an event to commemorate anniversary of the renowned poet Faiz Ahmad Faiz who was himself out of favour with and surveilled by Zia's regime due to his progressive views and anti-fascist writings. At the event in 1985, Iqbal Bano resplendent in a black sari, a universal color of protest and a garment banned by Zia's regime, and went on to sing Faiz Ahmad Faiz's famous poem of resistance Hum Dekhenge (We shall see), in an act of defiance against General Muhammad Zia-ul-Haq's diktat and rule. This simple act of defiance led to a crackdown by the Zia regime, persecution of the organizers of the event and a ban on Iqbal Bano appearing on national stage as a singer.

== Personal life ==
Iqbal Bano married a landlord in 1948 and had three children including two sons named Humayun and Afzal, also a daughter named Maleeha.

== Illness and death ==
After a short illness, at the age of 80, Iqbal Bano died in Lahore, Pakistan on 21 April 2009.

== Awards and recognition ==
Year	Award	Category	Result	Title	Ref.
1974	Pride of Performance	Award by the President of Pakistan	Won	Arts	
