= Evernew Studios =

Film studio in Pakistan

Evernew Studios is a film studio located on Multan Road in Lahore, Pakistan. It was and still is owned and operated by Agha G. A. Gul (1913 – 1983) and his family members.

After the death of the father Agha Gul in 1983, his two sons Sajjad Gul and Shehzad Gul now operate the studios.

The building was originally of Pancholi Studios, owned by Dalsukh M. Pancholi, and was later changed to Evernew Studios after the partition of India.

== Historical background ==
Agha G. A. Gul first established Evernew Studios in 1937. After the independence of Pakistan in 1947, the Hindu owner, Dalsukh Pancholi, of Pancholi Art Pictures Studios in Lahore, British India migrated to Bombay. So Agha G. A. Gul took over these abandoned studios and consolidated and renamed them as Evernew Studios in Lahore, Pakistan. Later, it became a sprawling 40-acre studio. Pakistani film industry, at its peak in the 1970s and 1980s, used to make over 100 films in a year.
