= Nigar Awards =

Pakistani film awards

Nigar Awards نگارانعامات Negār Inʿāmaʿat
- Current: 47th Nigar Awards
- Country: Pakistan
- First award: 1958 (for films released in 1957)

The Nigar Awards (Urdu: نگارانعامات, romanized: Negār Inʿāmaʿat, lit. 'Picture Awards') were presented in an annual award show to recognize outstanding achievement in Pakistani cinema. The honors were awarded by Nigar Magazine founded in 1948. The Nigar Awards were Pakistan's version of the Academy Awards. The 46th Nigar Awards ceremony was held on April 3, 2004, and a revival was planned in 2017.

The annual presentation ceremony featured performances by prominent artists. The first Nigar Awards ceremony was held in 1957, to honor the accomplishments of Pakistani cinema for the year 1956. In 2002, following the 46th Annual Nigar Awards, Nigar Magazine announced its discontinuation of the awards due to the collapse of the Pakistani cinema industry.

After a 15-year hiatus, with the revival of Pakistani cinema, the 47th Nigar Awards were announced to be held on 16 March 2017 in Karachi. They were eventually cancelled.

== History ==
The Nigar Awards were introduced in 1957 by Ilyas Rashidi, also known as Baba-e-Filmi Sahafat (translation: The Father of Film Journalism) in Pakistan. For almost 50 years, Nigar Awards were the only regular annual awards ceremony that took place in Pakistan.

The award was an extension of the Nigar Magazine, which was also founded by Rashidi in 1948 and was Pakistan's first weekly newspaper dedicated solely to Pakistani cinema. Ilyas Rashidi acquired experience in entertainment journalism through his association with Umer Azad (his older brother) and his daily newspaper Anjam, which had shifted its offices from Delhi to Karachi in 1947. Ilyas had been inspired by Filmfare magazine and thus purchased a children's magazine Monthly Nigar from his friend Ibne Hassan Nigar, and re-branded it as a weekly film magazine from Karachi. The first award distribution ceremony was held on 17 July 1958 (for films released in 1957) at Evernew Studios in Lahore, Pakistan.

Since 1979, the award administration also started to give Nigar Awards to television personalities and since 1982, to stage artists. The first TV personality to receive the award was Fatima Surayya Bajia who got a special award. Among stage artists, Furqan Haider and Moin Akhtar were the first to be honored with the award in the categories of best stage director and best stage compere respectively.

== Design ==
Ilyas Rashidi (died in 1997) had initially chosen the design of a lady statuette and the Nigar Awards continued with this award from 1957 to 1977. During the Islamic dictatorial rule of President General Zia-ul-Haq and his regime, the statue design was changed into a textual design. In 2017, the 47th Nigar Awards reverted to the original award design.

== Ceremony ==
Instead of the usual practice of envelope opening, the awards committee prints the names of the winners on the back of the invitation cards that are sent to all invitees. This removes the charm of suspenseful moments for the attendees. Despite all this, the awards committee has strict rules of only considering the candidacy of those films and television shows that are nominated for the awards and their copies are provided by the filmmakers or distributors to the Awards Committee of Nigar Awards. The Nigar Awards are also known for their impartial assessment and unbiased attitude as compared with other high-level awards in Pakistan for the public entertainment media. The awards committee had poets, scholars, film producers and senior actors from all over Pakistan. Another prominent factor of the awards is that, over time, various categories from both television and film industry that have been included to cover such subjects as Urdu, Punjabi and Pashto and Sindhi films.

== Categories ==
The Nigar Awards are divided into Urdu, Pashto, Punjabi and Sindhi sections, which each section having several categories:

- Best Film
- Best director
- Best Script
- Best Screenplay
- Nigar Award for Best Actor
- Nigar Award for Best Actress
- Best Supporting actor
- Best Supporting actress
- Best Music
- Best Lyrics
- Best Camera
- Best Female Singer
- Best Male Singer
- Best Film Editing
- Best Art Director
- Best Sound
- Best Comedian
- Special Awards
- Ilyas Rashidi Lifetime Achievement Gold Medal

== See also ==
- List of Nigar Awards
- Nigar
