= List of Pakistani films of 1972 =

A list of films produced in Pakistan in 1972 (see 1972 in film) in the Urdu language:

== 1972 ==
Title	Director	Cast	Genre	Notes
Aao Pyar Karen		Deeba, Nadeem, Rangeela		
Afsana Zindagi Ka	Shabab Keranvi	Zeba Ali, Mohammad Ali, Zeenat	Musical	The film was released on January 7, 1972.
Akhri Hamla		Shaista Qaiser, Kemal		
Angaray		Shamim Ara, Nadeem, Nisho		
Azaadi		Rani, Nasrullah Butt, Saqi		
Badguman		Tarannum, Habib, Asad		
Badle Gi Duniya Saathi		Zeba, Mohammad Ali, Iqbal Hassan		
Baharo Phool Barsao	M. Sadiq; Hasan Tariq	Rani, Waheed Murad, Sangeeta, Rukhsana, Munawar Zarif, Saiqa, Abbas Nosha, Kamal Irani, Tamanna, Rekha, Sheikh Iqbal, Changezi, Iqbal Durrani, Chakram, Ilyas Kashmiri and Aslam Pervaiz	Drama; Musical	A film based on Lucknow culture, released on August 11, 1972.
Bandagi		Shabnum, Waheed Murad, Talish		
Bazaar		Nisho, Imran Sangeeta		
Bhai Bhai		Rani, Kemal, Yousuf, Naghma		
Dil Ek Aina		Zeba, Mohammad Ali, Sangeeta		
Daulat Aur Duniya	Khalifa Saeed	Rozina, Waheed Murad, Aaliya, Aslam Pervaiz	Musical	The film was released on April 28, 1972.
Ehsaas	Nazar-ul-Islam	Shabnam, Nadeem, Rangeela, Mumtaz, Qavi, Sufia Bano, Lehri, Ajmal, Jalil Afghani, Santosh Rissal, Talish	Musical	The film was released on December 22, 1972.
Ek Raat	Jamil Akhtar	Deeba, Shahid, Sabiha, Santosh, Aslam Pervez	Musical	The film was released on September 29, 1972.
Farz Aur Mohabbat		Nayyar Sultana, Sudhir		
Gata Jaye Banjara		Zamurrad, Agha Sajjad		
Hill Station		Shamim Ara, Waheed Murad		
Ilzam	S. Suleman	Zeba Ali, Mohammad Ali, Sangeeta, Shahid	Musical	The film was released on March 10, 1972.
Jahan Baraf Girti Hai	Story, production and direction by Nazir Hussain	Yasmin Khan, Badar Munir		
Janwar		Chakori, Badar Munir		
Khalish		Rani, Waheed Murad, Allauddin		
Kon Apna Kon Paraya		Tarana, Habib, Talish		
Basheera		Habib-ur-Rehman, Sultan Rahi, Rozina		
Main Akela		Aasiya, Shahid, Asad		
Main Bhi To Insaan Hoon		Aasiya, Rangeela, Shahid		
Mann Ki Jeet	Shabab Keranvi	Shabnum, Nadeem, Ejaz, Sangeeta, Zarqa, Nanha, Farah Jalal, Qavi, Shahnawaz	Musical	The film was released on December 1, 1972.
Mere Hamsafar	Pervez Malik	Shabnam, Mohammad Ali, Aga Talish	Musical	The film was released on January 21, 1972.
Meri Mohabbat Tere Hawale		Deeba, Nazim, Aqeel		
Meri Zindagi Hai Naghma	Shevan Rizvi	Sangeeta, Rangeela, Saiqa, Qavi, Chakram, Tamanna, Aslam Pervez	Musical	The film was released on June 30, 1972.
Mohabbat	S. Suleman	Zeba, Mohammad Ali, Sabiha Khanum, Santosh, Andaleeb, Rangeela, Saiqa, Roshan, Saqi, Qavi, Sahira, Niggo, Chham Chham, Pervez Sajjad, Ghayyur Akhtar, Begum Khurshid Mirza	Musical	The film was released on June 2, 1972.
Naag Muni	Raza Mir	Rani, Waheed Murad, Sangeeta, Qavi, Rukhsana, Jalil Afghani, Masood Akhtar, Saqi, Arsalan, Talish	Musical	The film was released on April 7, 1972.
Pardes	Saqlain Rizvi	Deeba, Habib, Haidar, Rangeela, Zulfi, Naghma	Musical	The film was released on March 17, 1972.
Pazaib		Aasiya, Nadeem, Mustafa Qureshi		
Sabbaq	Syed Suleman	Zeba, Mohammad Ali, Husna, Ragni		
Sipah Salar		Saloni, Ejaz, Adeeb		
Sodagar		Rani, Adil, Talish		
Suhag		Shamim Ara, Nadeem, Qavi		
Umrao Jaan Ada	Hasan Tariq	Rani, Shahid, Zamurrad, Aasiya, Mumtaz, Rangeela, Lehri, Ladla, Imdad Hussain, Nayyar Sultana, Tamanna, Talat Siddiqi, Allauddin, Aga Talish	Romance; Musical	The film was released on December 29, 1972 and celebrated its Golden Jubilee at Pakistani cinemas.
Yeh Raaste Hain Pyaar Ke		Aaliya, Habib, Ejaz		
Zindgi Ek Safar Hai		Shamim Ara, Waheed Murad		
Zindgi Ke Mailay		Zamurrad, Sultan Rahi, Hamid Ch.		

== See also ==
- 1972 in Pakistan
