= List of Pakistani films of 2008 =

List of Pakistani films by year 2008

== 2008 ==
This is a list of films produced in Pakistan in 2008 (see 2008 in film) and in the Urdu language.

Film	Director	Cast	Genre
Azan	Roshan Malik	Shaan, Saima, Moammar Rana	
Anjaam	M Hanif	Shaan, Veena Malik, Sami Khan	Drama
Basanti	Hassan Askari	Shaan, Saima, Mustafa Qureshi	Drama
Haseeno Ka Mela			
Husn Ki Bijlian and Bharjai			
Ishq Badshah			
Kabhi Pyar Na Karna	Javed Raza	Moammar Rana, Zara Sheikh	Musical
Kala Pul	Saqib Mausoof	Saleem Iqbal, Angeline Malik, Munawwar Saeed	Neo-noir
Khair De Ka Ghareeb Yum	Arshad Khan	Shahid, Sonia Lal, Nazo, Ali Khan, Shabina khan, Mehwish	
Zill-e-Shah	Shaan Shahid	Saima Noor, Shaan Shahid, Noor Bukhari	
Khulay Aasman Ke Neechay	Javed Sheikh	Nadeem Baig, Sana, Saleem Sheikh, Meera, Humayoon Saeed	Musical
Meri Zindagi			
Gulabo			
Ramchand Pakistani	Mehreen Jabbar	Nandita Das, Syed Fazel Hussain, Rashid Farooqui	Drama
