= List of Pakistani films of 2006 =

List of Pakistani films by year 2006

This is a list of films produced in Pakistan in 2006 (see 2006 in film) and in the Urdu language.

== 2006 ==
Title	Director	Cast	Genre	Notes
Urdu language
Dulhan Banti Hein Naseebo Walian		Reema, Saud, Neeli, Jan Rambo		
Gunahon Ka Shehar		Sana, Ahmad Butt, Saima Khan		
Jism		Roofi Ana'am, Shamyl Khan		
Madam Diyaribaz		Saima, Ahmad Butt, Arbaz Khan		
Murder		Roofi Ana'am, Arbaz Khan, Shamyl Khan		
One Two Ka One		Saima, Moamar Rana, Reema		
Pehla Pehla Pyaar	Mubashir Luckman	Zara Sheikh, Nadeem, Resham, Ali Tabish, Babrak Shah	Romance; Drama	The film was released on January 11, 2006
Tarrap	Sangeeta	Nadeem, Resham, Saud, Babrak Shah	Drama	The film was released on October 24, 2006
Wapsi		Veena Malik, Shamyl Khan, Arbaz Khan		
Zakhmi Aurat		Sana, Shaan, Roofi Ana'am		
Zamin Ke Khuda		Saima, Shaan, Moamar Rana		Also released in Punjabi language (Double version film)

Title	Director	Cast	Genre	Notes
Pashto language
Andaz		Nazo, Arbaz Khan, Jahangir Khan		
Ajzi Loya Badshahi Da		Sidra Noor, Shahid Khan, Asif Khan		
Akhar Zarade Kana		Sidra Noor, Shahid Khan, Jahangir Khan		
Ashqi Badablada		Shabnam Chaudhry, Shahid Khan, Jahangir Khan		
Azad Qaidi		Asima, Shahid Khan, Jahangir Khan		
Dam Gunah Da Cheh Pakhton Dam		Sidra Noor, Shahid Khan, Imran Khan		
Dasey Data Meh Gora		Nazo, Arbaz Khan, Jahangir Khan		
Dilbarey		Shabnam Chaudhry, Shahid Khan, Asif Khan		
Dooddili Beminey		Asima, Shahid Khan, Jahangir Khan		
Ghulami Na Manam		Nazo, Arbaz Khan, Jahangir Khan		
Kaki Khan		Sana, Shahid Khan, Babrak Shah		
Lag Da Zra Na Tapos Oka		Sidra Noor, Arbaz Khan, Dilbar Munir		
Maku Kharab Sheh		Sidra Khan, Shahid Khan, Nemat Sarhadi		
Mena Maku Pagla		Sidra Noor, Shahid Khan, Asif Khan		
Musafar		Nazo, Arbaz Khan, Jahangir Khan		
Pakhton Yaar		Veena Mailk, Shahid Khan, Nemat Sarhadi		
Pezor Peh Chagla Bozam		Nazo, Arbaz Khan, Jahangir Khan		
Ranjiz Ranjiz		Asima, Ajab Gul, Shahid Khan		
Sa Be Yaad Satee		Sidra Noor, Jahangir Khan, Nemat Sarhadi		
Sabar Sheh Zargiya		Asima, Arbaz Khan, Ajab Gul		
Sozam Peh Angar		Veena Malik, Shahid Khan, Jahangir Khan		
Tata Chehilche Mai Sheh		Sidra Noor, Arbaz Khan, Jahangir Khan		
Yaar Baash		Asima, Ajab Gul, Jahangir Khan		
Zama Jana Gharibi Da		Sidra Noor, Shahid Khan, Asif Khan		
Zamana Satarge Yadegi		Sidra Khan, Arbaz Khan, Asif Khan		

== See also ==
- 2006 in Pakistan
