= Mujhe Jeene Do (1999 film) =

1999 Pakistani film

- Directed by: Javed Sheikh
- Written by: Pervaiz Kaleem
- Produced by: Mian Farzand Ali
- Starring: Meera; Babar Ali; Sana; Javed Sheikh; Nayyar Ejaz; Ismail Tara
- Music by: Amjad Bobby; Film song lyrics by Riaz ur Rehman Saghar
- Distributed by: Arain Pictures
- Release date: 3 September 1999
- Country: Pakistan
- Language: Urdu

Mujhe Jeene Do is a 1999 Urdu film, produced in Pakistan and directed by Javed Sheikh. The film stars Meera, Babar Ali, Sana and Javed Sheikh. The film's music is by Amjad Bobby.

== Cast ==
- Meera
- Babar Ali
- Sana
- Javed Sheikh
- Nayyar Ejaz
- Ismail Tara

== Awards ==
- Nigar Award for Best Sound for Mujhe Jeene Do (1999 film).
