= Tere Pyar Mein =

- Directed by: Hassan Askari
- Written by: Sherry Malik; Raja Riaz
- Produced by: Sajjad Gul
- Starring: Shaan; Zara Sheikh; Veena Malik; Badar Munir; Noor Bukhari; Irfan Khoosat; Raza; Sabira Sultana; Khalid Butt
- Edited by: Zulifquar Zulfi
- Music by: Amjad Bobby
- Distributed by: Evernew Pictures
- Release date: 28 December 2000
- Country: Pakistan
- Language: Urdu

Tere Pyar Mein (Urdu: تیرے پیار میں) (lit: In Your Love) is a 2000 Pakistani film which was released in December 2000. It launched the career of Zara Sheikh in Lollywood.

== Plot ==
The story is about a young Indian Sikh girl Preety played by Zara Sheikh, who goes to the historic city of Lahore, Pakistan for a religious pilgrimage of a Sikh holy place there with her father. A Pakistani boy named Ali (Shaan), who is a banker, falls in love with her. After the pilgrimage, she goes back to her country. Ali realizes that he feels lost without her and goes after her. They both are delighted to see each other, but Preety's friend in India, who is also in the Indian Army, is not able to deal with Preety falling in love with a Pakistani as he wants to marry her and also because of his hatred towards Pakistan because of Pakistan army which killed many indian troops in Kargil War. When Ali visits India, he sends his forces after the two lovers under the allegation that Ali is from Pakistan. The couple flees, and after days of hide and seek, Ali is barely able to destroy the Indian Army cars following them. In the last scene, the lovers arrive at the Pakistan-India border, where they see a Pakistani Flag, and their emotions are filled with joy.

== Film business ==
This film celebrated its 'diamond jubilee' (one year running), a highly successful movie.

== Soundtrack ==
The music is composed by Amjad Bobby, film song lyrics by Riaz ur Rehman Saghar and Aqeel Ruby

- "Kal Thi Mohabbat" - Hema Sardesai
- "Aasman Ko Lagane Haath Main" - Kavita Krishnamurthy
- "Haath Se Haath Kia Gaya - Duet" - Humaira Channa, Sonu Nigam
- "Haath Se Haath Kia Gaya - Male" - Sonu Nigam
- "Nikli Ghar Se" - Jaspinder Narula
- "Sangam Hua" - Kavita Krishnamurthy
- "Dum Ishq Da Yaara" - Jaspinder Narula

== Cast ==
- Shaan as Ali
- Zara Sheikh as Preeti
- Veena Malik as Amina
- Noor Bukhari
- Irfan Khoosat as Servant Ramzan
- Badar Munir
- Khalid Butt
- Sabira Sultana
- Raza as Major Narayan
- Raja Riaz as Balbir Singh
- Rashid Mehmood

== Awards ==
Year	Award	Film	Winner	Result
2000	Nigar Awards Best Film	Tere Pyar Mein	Shehzad Gul	Won
2000	Nigar Awards Best Dialog	Tere Pyar Mein	Rashid Sajid	Won
2000	Nigar Awards Best director	Tere Pyar Mein	Hassan Askari	Won
2000	Nigar Awards Best Writer	Tere Pyar Mein	Raja Aziz Khan	Won
2000	Nigar Awards Best actor	Tere Pyar Mein	Shaan	Won
2000	Nigar Awards Best actress	Tere Pyar Mein	Zara Sheikh	Won
2000	Nigar Awards Best supporting actor	Tere Pyar Mein	Raja Riaz	Won
2000	Nigar Awards Best editor	Tere Pyar Mein	Zulfi	Won
2000	Nigar Awards Best sound editor	Tere Pyar Mein	Afzal Hussain	Won
2002	Lux Style Award Best Film	Tere Pyar Mein	Shehzad Gul	Won
