= Andaleeb (actress) =

Pakistani actress (1943-2016)

- Born: Andaleeb Begum; 3 October 1943; Calcutta, British India
- Died: 16 August 2016 (aged 72); Karachi, Sindh, Pakistan
- Other names: Andleeb
- Occupations: Actress; Model; Air Hostess
- Years active: 1963 – 2006
- Children: 3

Andaleeb (Urdu: عندلیب), also known as Andleeb, was a Pakistani actress and model. She worked in both Urdu and Punjabi films and is known for her roles in films such as Suhag, Mera Saaya, Mohabbat, Zindagi Ek Safar Hay, Sadhu Aur Sheitan, Badal Aur Bijli, Gharana, Usay Dekha Usay Chaha, Shehar Aur Saye, Ghunghat and Yeh Zamana Aur Hay.

== Early life ==
Andaleeb was born in 1943 in Calcutta during British India. Her mother was from Calcutta, and her father hailed from Iran. After the partition of India, her parents migrated to Pakistan and settled in Karachi.

At school she joined drama stage and tableau presentations. She completed her matriculation from Karachi College later she got a job as an air hostess with the national flag carrier PIA and worked there for five years. She was spotted by a PTV director who invited her to work in an advertisement. She accepted and did a commercial for Rexona soap and soon after left PIA and begin to work in dramas.

== Career ==
She started her acting from PTV Karachi Centre and made her debut in drama Khuda Ki Basti. The drama was written by Shaukat Siddiqui based on his novel and she portrayed the role of Mrs. Kamal but the serial turned out to be a super-hit and won many laurels and accolades.

In 1969, Mohsin Shirazi was making a skit show called Gar Too Bura Na Maney. He noted Andaleeb in a commercial and her expressions seemed to stand out so he cast her in the show. In 1972, Parvez Malik cast Andaleeb in his film Suhag and Andaleeb had the role of sister, opposite Nadeem and Rozina and immediately after this film that Andaleeb got popular as a vamp.

In 1972, S. Suleman was making his film and he cast Andaleeb in a vamp role. He directed his film Mohabbat, which presented a story of a typical upper-middle `60s household. Mohammad Ali and Zeba portrayed the role of husband and wife who meet and later they both get lost from each other but the pair meet again, Mohammad Ali portrayed the role of a responsible and warm hearted husband and gets involved with a poor girl. Santosh Kumar and Sabiha Khanum were also part of the cast. Andaleeb portrayed the role of fiancée and takes her marriage to Ali for granted. Nisar Bazmi composed a super hit song which was sung by Tahira Syed, titled Yeh Mehfil Jo Aaj Saji Hai, Iss Mehfil Main Hai Koi Hum Sa, Hum Sa Ho To Samne Aaey and it was picturized on Andaleeb.

Later in 1973, Mohsin Shirazi had selected Andaleeb mentally for the film he was making Badal Aur Bijli along with Nadeem and Shabnam. In 1995 she portrayed the role of Sakeena in drama Dukh Sukh which was written by Abdul Qadir Junejo and directed by Muhammad Saleem Tahir.

Later she was noticed by film director Shahzad Rafique in a drama on PTV and was impressed by her acting skills. In 1996, she was cast by Shahzad and Syed Noor in film Ghunghat which became a super hit film at the box office and she won Nigar Award for Best Supporting Actress.

Then she worked in films such as Ham Kisi Say Kam Nahin, Dil Valay, Fareb, Muhafiz, Qaid and Sheru Badshah.

In 2006, she retired and went to live with her children in Karachi.

== Personal life ==
Andaleeb married her former neighbor. They have a son and daughter. She divorced him and took the custody of her two children and went to live with her parents. Later she married Karim and she had one daughter, singer and actress Amna Karim.

== Illness and death ==
Andaleeb contracted tuberculosis from which she died in Karachi on August 16, 2016.

== Filmography ==
=== Television ===
Year	Title	Role	Network
1969	Khuda Ki Basti	Mrs. Kamal	PTV
1969	Gar Too Bura Na Maney	Shireen	PTV
1995	Dukh Sukh	Sakeena	PTV

=== Film ===
Year	Film	Language
1970	Soughat	Urdu
1972	Suhag	Urdu
1972	Mera Saaya	Urdu
1972	Mohabbat	Urdu
1972	Zindagi Ek Safar Hay	Urdu
1973	Sadhu Aur Sheitan	Urdu
1973	Badal Aur Bijli	Urdu
1973	Gharana	Urdu
1974	Usay Dekha Usay Chaha	Urdu
1974	Shehar Aur Saye	Urdu
1981	Yeh Zamana Aur Hay	Urdu
1982	Maidan	Punjabi
1982	Aab-e-Hayyat	Urdu
1982	Jahez	Punjabi
1983	Do Bheegay Badan	Urdu
1996	Raju Ban Geya Gentleman	Urdu
1996	Chief Sahib	Urdu
1996	Ghunghat	Urdu
1997	Hum Tumhare Hain	Urdu
1997	Ham Kisi Say Kam Nahin	Urdu
1997	Dil Valay	Urdu
1997	Fareb	Urdu
1998	Muhafiz	Urdu
1999	Qaid	Urdu
2005	Sheru Badshah	Urdu

== Awards and recognition ==
Year	Award	Category	Result	Title	Ref.
1996	Nigar Award	Best Supporting Actress	Won	Ghunghat	
