= Ghoonghat (disambiguation) =

A ghoonghat is a veil worn by Indian women

Ghoonghat or Ghunghat may also refer to

- Ghunghat (1960 film), an Indian film directed by Ramanand Sagar
- Ghunghat (1962 film), a Pakistani film directed by Khurshid Anwar
- Ghunghat (1996 film), a Pakistani film directed by Syed Noor
