= Family Pride =

Family Pride is the name of:

- Family Pride, the British soap opera.
- The previous name of the Family Equality Council.
- Family Pride Canada, a Canadian organization advocating for family equality for LGBT parents.
