= Salakhain =

2004 Pakistani film

- Directed by: Shahzad Rafique
- Written by: Amjad Islam Amjad
- Produced by: Rashid Khawaja; Khalil Rana
- Starring: Zara Sheikh; Meera; Saud; Ahmed Butt; Farooq Zamir
- Cinematography: Ali Jan
- Music by: M. Arshad
- Distributed by: Mandviwalla Entertainment
- Release date: 13 August 2004
- Country: Pakistan
- Language: Urdu

Salakhain (Urdu: سلاخیں) is a Pakistani Lollywood film which was released in 2004. Stars included Ahmed Butt, Zara Sheikh, Sami Khan, and Meera. The music was composed by M Arshad. Sajid Hassan and Saud were cast as villains with Shafi Muhammad as their boss.

== Synopsis ==
Salakhain is an Urdu feature film set in the backdrop of Gawalmandi, Lahore. It is the story of a young man who is passionate about life and dreams of a bright and prosperous future. Little does he know that he is destined for a future engulfed with hatred, anger and revenge.

Introducing Ahmed Butt, a male model and winner of LUX Style Awards for 2003 for Best Model, in the lead role, Salakhain is devoid of compassion and sympathy, but full of action.

== Plot ==
Meera

Salakhain tells the story of an innocent, hardworking student called Faizan (Ahmed Butt) who comes from a lower-middle-class family and who is in love with an equally innocent and earnest looking young girl. Faizan is 'the good son' and wants to live up to his father's dream which is to run a business and improve the lifestyle of their family. Unfortunately the dreams are shattered while he was taking his exams as he is implicated in a crime- a dispute with the 'booti mafia' (people facilitating cheating during exams), this results in his father's death and mother's mental health suffers due to shock of the tragic events, one following the other in quick succession.

In jail, he meets a man called Zaigham (Saud) and becomes friends with him who knows his enemies well and has his own issues to settle with them. Zaigham gets Faizan out of jail. Faizan now wants revenge for his parents. The rest is as predictable as any action movie made anywhere in the world - a journey towards retribution, passing through the maze called politics and crime.

Zara Sheikh, the girl Faizan loves, marries (Sami Khan) a police officer who is looking for Faizan since he is a criminal and Zara hides his picture when she sees it in Sami's wanted list so he won't know what he looks like. Meera and Faizan team up to kill Sajid Hassan who is the gang leader. Meera wants to kill him because he killed her sister by throwing acid on her face. Faizan finds his mother and, at the end, in a shootout Faizan finds out that Zara is married and Meera and Faizan are killed in a shootout.

== Film's Reception ==
It was a super-hit film of 2004 in Pakistan.

== Cast ==
- Ahmed Butt as Faizan
- Zara Sheikh as Sawera
- Meera as Natasha
- Saud Qasmi as Zaigham
- Sajid Hasan as underworld gang leader Jibran
- Sami Khan as Police officer Mansoor
- Shafi Mohammad
- Nayyar Ejaz
- Tariq Teddy as a Barber
- Amanat Chan

== Accolades ==
Ceremony	Category	Result
4th Lux Style Awards	Best Film	Won

== Soundtrack ==
- "Barish" - Sonu Nigam, Alka Yagnik; Lyrics by Khawaja Pervaiz
- "Naina" - Sonu Nigam; Lyrics by Amjad Islam Amjad
- "Ishq Khuda" - Naghmana Jaferi; Lyrics by Riaz Ur Rehman Saghar
- "Sunehri Shaam" - Zille Huma; Lyrics by Riaz ur Rehman Saghar
- "Madhoshian" - Shabnam Majeed; Lyrics by Ayub Khawar
- "Salakhein" - Naghmana Jaferi; Lyrics by Ayub Khawar
- "Vaada Hain Vaadon Ko" - Kumar Sanu
