= Qasam (film) =

1993 film

Qasam (1993 film)
- Directed by: Syed Noor
- Written by: Pervaiz Kaleem
- Produced by: Javed Chaudry Aziz
- Starring: Saleem Sheikh; Iram Hassan
- Music by: Amjad Bobby
- Release date: 24 December 1993
- Country: Pakistan
- Language: Urdu

Qasam (lit. The Vow ) is a 1993 Pakistani film directed by Syed Noor starring Nadeem, Saleem Sheikh and Iram Hassan. This was the debut film for actor Saleem Sheikh, but it got delayed and film Mohabatt Kay Saudagar was released earlier starring Saleem Sheikh.

== Plot ==
The story was based on a boy's story whose parents split up because of his father's second marriage & his mother took him away from his father.

== Cast ==
- Nadeem
- Saleem Sheikh
- Kaveeta
- Iram Hassan
- Kanwal
