= Ahmed Butt =

Pakistani model and film actor

- احمد بٹ
- Born: 18 November 1975 (age 50); Lahore, Pakistan
- Occupations: Model, Film Actor
- Years active: 2004 present
- Spouse: Humaira Arshad (m. 2004–2019)

Ahmed Butt is a Pakistani model and a film actor.

== Early life and career ==
Ahmed Butt was born into an ethnic Kashmiri family in Lahore, Pakistan on 18 November 1975.

During his marriage with Pakistani singer Humaira Arshad from 2004 to 2019, their many separations and reconciliations were often in the news. On 2 November 2016, their latest reconciliation was reported in Pakistani newspapers. Humaira had accused Butt of physical and emotional abuse, and added that he had discontinued work after marriage and she had to fend for the family alone. Butt denied the claims. Ahmed Butt also denied Humaira's allegation that he had demanded 30 million rupees from her. He claimed that she owed money to him related to a flat.

In April 2019, Humaira Arshad and Butt divorced. Ahmed Butt received the custody of their son and had plans to move to the United States with him, whereas Humaira Arshad would be able to focus on her singing career in Pakistan.

== Filmography ==
Year	Movie
2004	Salakhain
2006	Gunahon Ka Sheher
2006	Mein Ek Din Laut Kay Aaoon Ga
2012	Sher Dil
