= Arshad Mehmood (singer) =

Pakistani singer

- Occupation: Singer
- Years active: 1990 – present
- Awards: Won 2 Nigar Awards in 1992 and 1996 for'Best Playback Singer'

Arshad Mehmood is a Pakistani singer.

Many of his songs for the Pakistani film industry, commonly known as Lollywood, have been popular. He won the Nigar Award for Best Playback Singer in 1992 and again in 1996.

== Super-hit film songs ==
- "Dekha Jo Chehra Tera Mausam Bhi Pyaara Laga", sung by Arshad Mehmood, lyrics by Riaz ur Rehman Saghar and music by Amjad Bobby in film Ghunghat (1996).
- "Ho Sakay Tau Mera Eik Kaam Karo", sung by Arshad Mehmood, lyrics by Saeed Gillani, music by M. Arshad in film Dopatta Jal Raha Hai (1998).
