= Shamim Ara =

Pakistani film actress (1938 - 2016)

- شمیم آرا
- Born: Putli Bai; 22 March 1938; Aligarh, United Provinces, British India
- Died: 5 August 2016 (aged 78); London, England
- Other name: The Tragic Beauty
- Occupations: Actress; Film producer; Film director in Pakistan
- Years active: 1956 – 2010
- Spouses: Sardar Rind; Abdul Majid Carim; Fareed Ahmed; Dabeer-ul-Hasan (before 2016)
- Children: Salman Majid Carim (son)

Shamim Ara (شمیم آرا, 22 March 1938 – 5 August 2016) was a Pakistani film actress, director, and producer. She was known as The Tragic Beauty because of the tragic heroine roles she often portrayed in films. She was one of the most popular and successful actresses of the 1960s, 1970s, 1980s, and 1990s. She is regarded as one of the most influential actresses of all time in Pakistani cinema.

== Early life ==
Ara was born as Putli Bai in Aligarh, Uttar Pradesh, British India on 22 March 1938. Her mother was a professional dancer who encouraged her to pursue acting and dancing. Her maternal grandmother was her guardian, taking key decisions regarding her early life and career. The family relocated to Karachi in 1956, following the partition of India.

== Career ==
In 1956, Putli Bai's family was visiting some relatives in Lahore, Pakistan, when, after a chance meeting with the well-known film director, Najam Naqvi, she was signed for his next movie. He was searching for a new face for his film Kanwari Bewah (1956) and was impressed by her cute face, sweet voice, approachable personality, and innocent yet inviting smile. It was Najam Naqvi who introduced her under the stage name Shamim Ara, because her previous name was similar to the infamous dacoit Putli Bai. Though the film did not attract many viewers, a noticeable new female star had appeared on the horizon of the Pakistan film industry.

She had her first prominent role in 1958 in Anwar Kamal Pasha's Anarkali as a Surayya alongside Noor Jehan, who played the titular Anarkali. For the next two years, Ara went on to star in a few films, but none of them were a major success at the box office, including Waah Re Zamanay, Raaz, and Alam Ara. However, in 1960, a substantial role in S. M. Yusuf's Saheli as an amnesiac bride proved to be a breakthrough for her career. Ara then appeared in 1962 in Qaidi as a woman yearning for the return of her beloved. The film featured Faiz Ahmed Faiz's ghazal, Mujh Se Pehli Si Mohabbat Mere Mehboob Na Maang, which was picturized on her, with the Noor Jehan lending her voice to the song, marking the first instance where Jehan gave her voice to Ara's character. She had become a household name. Her fame and impeccable acting skills landed her the title character in Naela (1965), the first color film produced in then-West Pakistan. Her portrayal of the tragic Naila won her further critical acclaim. She went on to star in many hit films, including Devdas, Doraha, and Hamraz. However, Qaidi (1962), Chingari (1964), Farangi (1964), Naela (1965), Aag Ka Darya (1966), Lakhon Mein Aik (1967), Saiqa (1968), and Salgira (1968) were landmarks in her career, securing her a position as the top actress of the 1960s in Lollywood.

Her acting career came to a halt when she retired as a leading lady in the early 1970s. But that did not stop her from being a part of the Pakistani film industry, as she pioneered to produce and direct films on her own. However, none of those films reached the level of success Shamim Ara had at the height of her acting career.

Jaidaad (1959) and Tees Maar Khan (1989) were the only two Punjabi movies in which she performed.

=== As a film producer ===
In 1968, she produced her first film Saiqa (1968 film) which was based on the novel by Razia Butt. The film attracted a large number of viewers especially females.

=== As a film director ===
In 1976, she made her directorial debut with Jeo Aur Jeenay Do. Later, she also directed the Diamond Jubilee film Munda Bigra Jaye (1995). Other films she directed include Playboy (1978), Miss Hong Kong (1979), Miss Singapore (1985), Miss Colombo (1984), Lady Smuggler (1987), Lady Commando (1989), Haathi Mere Saathi (1993), Aakhri Mujra (1994), Baita (1994), Munda Bigra Jaye (1995), Hum To Chaley Susral (1996), Miss Istanbul (1996), Love 95 (1996), Hum Kisi Say Kum Nahin (1997), and Pal Do Pal (1999). For Haathi Mere Saathi and Aakhri Mujra, she won two consecutive Nigar Awards as a Best Director.

== Personal life ==
Ara was married four times. Her first husband was Sardar Rind, a landlord of Balochistan, who died in a car accident. She then married Abdul Majid Carim, the scion of the family that runs Agfa Color Film Company. They had a son, Salman Majid Carim, who was to be her only child, but the marriage ended in divorce. Her third marriage was to W.Z. Ahmed's son director Fareed Ahmed. That marriage, too, ended in divorce after only three days. Ara later married director and writer Dabeer-ul-Hassan. They lived in Lahore until 2005, when she and her son Salman Majid Carim moved to London, while her husband remained in Pakistan.

== Illness and death ==
Ara's health declined after she suffered a stroke in 2001. During a visit to Pakistan, she suffered a brain hemorrhage on 19 October 2010 and was taken back to London for treatment. She remained in and out of hospital for six years in coma, and was cared for by her only son, Salman Majid Carim. Ara died on 5 August 2016 in a hospital in London after prolonged illness.

Her only son led the funeral arrangements, and she was buried in the UK.

== Filmography ==
=== Film ===
Year	Title	Role(s)	Producer	Director	Notes	Ref(s).
1956	Kanwari Bewah				Debut	
1956	Miss 56					
1958	Anarkali	Surayya				
1958	Wah Re Zamaney					
1959	Alam Ara	Alam Ara				
1959	Apna Paraya					
1959	Faislah					
1959	Savera					
1959	Jaidaad				Punjabi-film	
1959	Mazloom					
1959	Raaz	Ghazala				
1960	Bhabi					
1960	Do Ustad					
1960	Izzat					
1960	Raat Ke Rahi					
1960	Roopmati Baaz Bahadur	Roopmati				
1960	Saheli	Jamila				
1961	Insan Badalta Hai	Jamila				
1961	Zamana Kya Kahega					
1961	Zamin Ka Chaand					
1962	Aanchal					
1962	Mehboob					
1962	Mera Kya Qasoor					
1962	Qaidi					
1962	Inqalab					
1963	Dulhan	Najma				
1963	Ek Tera Sahara					
1963	Ghazala					
1963	Kala Pani					
1963	Saazish					
1963	Seema	Seema				
1963	Tange Wala					
1964	Baap Ka Baap					
1964	Chingari					
1964	Farangi	Gul				
1964	Haveli					
1964	Maihkhanah					
1964	Paigham	Khumar				
1964	Pyaar Ki Sazaa					
1964	Shabab					
1964	Shikari					
1964	Tanha					
1965	Devdas	Parvati				
1965	Dil Ke Tukre	Musarrat				
1965	Fashion					
1965	Naela	Naela				
1966	Aag Ka Darya					
1966	Jalwa					
1966	Majboor	Tasneem				
1966	Mere Mehboob					
1966	Pardah	Zahida				
1966	Qabeelah					
1967	Doraha	Naheed				
1967	Hamraz	Shehzadi/ Gul Bano			dual role	
1967	Lakhon Mein Aik	Shakuntla				
1968	Saiqa	Saiqa	Yes			
1968	Dil Mera Dharkan Teri	Najma				
1968	Mera Ghar Meri Jannat	Najma				
1969	Salgira	Shabana/ Salma				
1969	Aanch					
1969	Dil-e-Betaab	Bano				
1970	Aansoo Ban Gaey Moti	Raji				
1970	Bewafa	Amber				
1970	Eik Zalim Eik Hasina					
1971	Parai Aag					
1971	Wehshi					
1971	Khak Aur Khoon					
1972	Angarey	Ayesha				
1972	Suhag		Yes			
1973	Khwaab Aur Zindagi	Najma				
1973	Farz		Yes			
1974	Bhool	—N/a	Yes			
1976	Zaib-un-Nisa	Zaib-un-Nisa				
1978	Playboy	—N/a	Yes	Yes		
1981	Mere Apne	Aashi	Yes	Yes		
1984	Miss Colombo	—N/a	Yes	Yes		
1985	Miss Singapore	—N/a	Yes	Yes		
1993	Haathi Mere Saathi	—N/a		Yes		
1994	Aakhri Mujra	—N/a	Yes	Yes		
1999	Pal Do Pal	—N/a		Yes		

== Tributes and honours ==
She received tributes from several celebrities, including Resham, Humaima Malick, Nadeem, Ghulam Mohiuddin and Mustafa Qureshi, following her illness and passing. Actor Jawed Sheikh stated that she was "the kind of actress she was is hard to find", and considered her as "the finest of them all [actresses]" along with Nayyar Sultana.

Pakistan National Council of Arts held an event in September 2016 to pay tribute to Ara.

At the 2026 Cannes Film Festival, actress Sanam Saeed paid tribute to Ara, describing her as the starting point of a lineage of women in Pakistani cinema and highlighting her legacy as an actor, producer and director who broke boundaries and opened doors for women behind the camera.

== Artistry and legacy ==
As a director, Ara didn't dwell on the real issues in her directorial projects and rely on formulaic filmmaking. According to screenwriter Vasay Chaudhry, Miss franchise was perhaps her most important contribution to the Pakistani cinema, and he further noted that she knew exactly what the box office craved for and over the years, she mastered the commercial film formulae.

She was one of the few Pakistani actresses who transitioned into directing, and was the first one to took-on full time direction. Ara was referenced in 1973 film Khwab Aur Zindagi in the song as "Khud ko samajh rahi hai shayad Shamim Ara" ("She's probably trying to understand herself, Shamim Ara"). In 1971, Ara was part of a Pakistani delegation to Sri Lanka, along with Waheed Murad and Noor Jehan, for a film festival.

== Awards and recognition ==
Year	Award	Category	Result	Title	Ref.
1960	Nigar Award	Best Support Actress	Won	Saheli	
1964	Nigar Award	Best Actress	Won	Farangi	
1965	Nigar Award	Best Actress	Won	Naela	
1967	Nigar Award	Best Actress	Won	Lakhon Mein Aik	
1968	Nigar Award	Best Actress	Won	Saiqa	
1993	Nigar Award	Best Director	Won	Haathi Mere Saathi	
1994	Nigar Award	Best Director	Won	Aakhri Mujra	
1999	Nigar Award	The Ilyas Rashidi Gold medal	Won	—N/a	
2005	Lux Style Awards	Chairperson's Lifetime Award	Won	—N/a	

== See also ==
- List of Lollywood actors
