= Amjad Bobby =

Pakistani film music composer (1942-2005)

- Born: Amjad Hussain; 1942; Amritsar, Punjab, British India
- Died: 14 April 2005 (aged 62–63); Lahore, Punjab, Pakistan
- Other name: Amjad Bobby
- Occupations: Film composer, music Director
- Years active: 1969–2005
- Awards: Won 4 Nigar Awards

Amjad Bobby (Punjabi, Urdu: امجد بوبی; 1942 – 15 April 2005) was an acclaimed Pakistani music composer and director.

== Early life and career ==
He was born in Amritsar, British India in 1942. His father wanted him to be a clerk but he preferred to become a film music composer. His first film as a music director was Aik Nagina (1969), whose song "Dil nahi toe koi sheesha koi pathar hi milay" in Ahmed Rushdi's voice gained him some recognition.

"Initially, like all musicians, he achieved fame after struggling and assisted renowned musicians like A. Hameed, Nashad, Nisar Bazmi, Khwaja Khurshid Anwar and Rasheed Attre." Amjad Bobby had little success in the 1970s. His first hit song was "Kajra lagana chor do, sawan ka rukh badal jaye ga", sung by great singer Mehdi Hassan for movie Ansoo Aur Sholay. Later he composed music of movie Aik Nagina with two super hit songs "Beena tera naam" and "Tere bin raha jaye naa". The decade of the 1980s brought luck for Amjad Bobby and he gave many great songs to the Pakistani film industry. His success continued till his death in 2005.

=== Death ===
Amjad Bobby died of cardiac arrest on 15 April 2005 in Lahore. His death was a big loss for Pakistani film music industry because Amjad Bobby was a composer who almost singlehandedly gave film music a new direction and brought much freshness into the film music in the 1990s, when it most needed it in Pakistan.

== Awards and recognition ==
- Nigar Award for Best Music Director in film 'Kabhi Alwida Na Kehna' (1983)
- Nigar Award for film Ghunghat (1996)
- Nigar Award for film Deewane Tere Pyar Ke (1997)
- Nigar Award for film Yeh Dil Aap Ka Huwa (2002)
- He also received the 'Bolan Award' for best Music Composer for film Mujhe Jeene Do (1999).

== Worked with many film playback singers ==
He had worked with singers from both Pakistan and India. He composed music for Ahmed Rushdi, Salma Agha, Akhlaq Ahmed, Ghulam Abbas, A Nayyar, Waris Baig, Shazia Manzoor, Humera Channa, Arshad Mehmood, Kumar Sanu, Udit Narayan, Alka Yagnik, Sonu Nigam, Kavita, Saira Nasim, Jaspinder Narula.

=== Special appearances as a live singer ===
At the Nigar Awards presentation, he sang a song from his movie 'Kabhi Haan Kabhi Naa'. The song was originally sung by Arshad Mehmood, but due to his busy schedule, he could not come so Amjad Bobby sang in his place. He also sang in Javed Sheikh's movie Mushkil, and performed this song on stage several times.

== Filmography as music composer ==
Year	Film
2008	Khulay Aasman Ke Neechay
2008	Kabhi Pyar Na Karna
2005	Koi Tujh Sa Kahan
2003	Laaj
2002	Yeh Dil Aap Ka Huwa
2000	Tere Pyar Mein
2000	Ghar Kab Aao Gay
2000	Mujhe Jeene Do
1999	Inteha
1998	Kahin Pyar Na Ho Jae
1998	Karz
1997	Muhabbat Hai Kya Cheez
1997	Chupke Chupke
1997	Deewarein
1997	Yes Boss
1997	Deewane Tere Pyar Ke
1997	Sangam
1996	Ghunghat
1996	Chief Sahib
1995	Raju Ban Gaya Gentleman
1995	Dharkan
1994	Khoobsoorat Jahan
1994	Kabhi Haan Kabhi Naan
1994	Mushkil
1993	Qasam
1989	Barood Ki Chaon
1985	Aag Ka Samandar
1985	Benazir Qurbani
1984	Bobby
1984	Lazawal
1983	Kabhi Alvida Na Kehna
1978	Baraat
1977	Meri Bhabhi
1976	Raja Jani
1969	Nagina

== Film songs ==
Song name	Film	Year
Dil Nahin Tau Koi Sheesha	Aik Nagina	1969
Lehra Kay Pee Gaye	Raja Jani	1976
Kajra Lagana Chorr Dou	Ansoo Aur Sholay	
Beena Tera Naam	Naqsh-e-Qadam	1970s
Tere bin raha jaye na	Naqsh-e-Qadam	
Kabhi Alwida Na Kehna	Kabhi Alwida Na Kehna	1983
Mera Pyar Bhi Tu	Lazawal	1984
Mil gai Mil gai Mujhko Pyar Ki Woh Manzil	Aik Nagina	
Aap Apni Misal Hota Hae	Lazawal	1984
Ik Bar Milo Humse Tau	Bobby	1984
Jabse Tu Zindagi Me Aya	Nadia	1985
Mushkil Hae Bada Mushkil Hae	Mushkil	1994
Dil Ho Gaya Hae Tera Diwana	Mushkil	1994
Khoobsoorat Jahan	Khoobsorat Jahan	
Aa Pyar Dil Mein Jaga	Sangam	1996
Surmai Baadlon Kay Peechhe	Sangam	1996
Dekha Jo Chehra Tera, Mausam Pyara Laga	Ghunghat	1996
Choodian Chanakti Haen	Raju Ban Gaya Gentleman	1996
Haseenon se Nazneeno se	Chief Sahib	1996
Ik Karz Muhabbat hae gin gin k	Karz	1998
Deewane Tere Pyar Kay	Deewane Tere Pyar Ke	1997
Dil Kay Badle Dil	Ghar Kab Aao Gay	2000
Haath Se Haath Kya Gaya	Tere Pyar Mein	2000
Yeh Dil Aap Ka Huwa	Yeh Dil Aap Ka Huwa	2002
Falak Se Sitara	Yeh Dil Aap Ka Huwa	2002
Mun Chali Re Aai	Laaj	2003
Koi Tujh Sa Kahan	Koi Tujh Sa Kahan	2005

== See also ==
- Javed Sheikh, directed "Mushkil", its music was composed by Amjad Bobby
- Kabhi Pyar Na Karna, (2008) film, Amjad Bobby is the music composer
