= Honour Killing (film) =

- Theatrical release poster
- Directed by: Avtar Bhogal
- Written by: Avtar Bhogal
- Screenplay by: Avtar Bhogal
- Story by: Avtar Bhogal
- Produced by: Manmohan Singh
- Starring: Zara Sheikh; Sandeep Singh
- Cinematography: Chris Tritschler
- Edited by: Rajeev Gupta
- Music by: Uttam Singh
- Production companies: ABC Films International; Ek Onkar Films
- Release date: 27 February 2015
- Running time: 145 minutes
- Country: India
- Languages: Hindi; Punjabi; English

Honour Killing is a 2015 Bollywood multilingual social drama film written and directed by Avtar Bhogal, and produced by Manmohan Singh under the banners of ABC Films International and Ek Onkar Films. The film features actors Zara Sheikh and Sandeep Singh in the lead roles. The film's music was composed by Uttam Singh.

== Cast ==
- Zara Sheikh as Sameera
- Sandeep Singh as Sunny
- Tom Alter as Mr. Smith
- Gulshan Grover as Harjinder Singh
- Prem Chopra as Gurmail Singh
- Majid Hussein
- Javed Sheikh
- Chloe Wicks
- Sandeep Garcha
- Gurdial Sira
- Karan Singh
- Ward Khan
- Pammi Dhillon
- Zeeshan Ali
- Scott Mills as Police Officer

== Music ==
Honour Killing

Soundtrack album by Uttam Singh
- Released: 13 March 2014
- Genre: Feature film soundtrack
- Length: 41:42
- Label: Blue Tomatoes Music

Uttam Singh chronology
Rajjo (2013)	Honour Killing (2014)

Uttam Singh composed the film score of Honour Killing with lyrics by Dev Kohli.

All lyrics are written by Dev Kohli; all music is composed by Uttam Singh.

Honour Killing
No.	Title	Singer(s)	Length
1.	"Dilan Te Hukumtaan - Female"	Shreya Ghoshal	4:58
2.	"Dilan Te Hukumtaan - Male"	Kunal Ganjawala	5:05
3.	"Dholna"	Shreya Ghoshal, Kunal Ganjawala	5:50
4.	"Dharti Guruan DI"	Lakhwinder Wadali	6:29
5.	"Khao Piyo Jio"	Sumitra Iyer, Ravinder Updhyay	4:33
6.	"Rabba Maaf Kareen"	Roop Kumar Rathod	7:11
7.	"Balle Balle Shava Shava"	Javed Ali, Uttam Singh	7:36
Total length:			41:42
