= Kaleem Usmani =

Pakistani poet, lyricist (1928-2000)

- Born: Ehtisham Ilahi; 28 February 1928; Saharanpur, British India
- Died: 28 August 2000 (aged 72); Lahore, Pakistan
- Occupations: Poet, lyricist
- Writing career
- Language: Urdu
- Years active: 1955 – 2000
- Genre: Ghazal
- Notable awards: Nigar Awards in 1973 and 1978

Kaleem Usmani (born Ehtisham Ilahi; 28 February 1928 – 28 August 2000) was a Pakistani Urdu poet who wrote ghazals, naats, patriotic songs and more than one hundred songs for thirty-seven Urdu films.

He earned recognition as a lyricist by winning 2 Nigar Awards as 'Best Lyricist' in 1973 and 1978.

He worked at Pakistan Television Corporation and Radio Pakistan besides working for Pakistan films during which he wrote lyrics for Urdu films.

== Early life ==
Kaleem Usmani was born Ehtisham Ilahi in Saharanpur, British India on 28 February 1928, in a family related to the Shabbir Ahmad Usmani. After partition of the Indian subcontinent, he migrated to Pakistan and lived his life in Lahore city.

== Career ==
Prior to migration, he learnt poetry from his father Fazal Ilahi. When he settled in Lahore, he took poetry classes from Ehsan Danish. He was often invited to mushairas and subsequently he was offered work in films as a lyricist. His first film was Intekhab (1955). The film flopped at the box office and later he wrote songs for Bara Aadmi (1957), including "Kahe Jalana Dil Ko Chhoro" which became one of the prominent songs in the country. In 1959, he wrote songs, including "Mithi Mithi Batiyon Se Jia Na Jala" for Raaz (1959) which helped him to retain his position in the Pakistani film industry. In 1966, he wrote songs for Hum Dono (1966) and Jalwa (1966). Songs "Koi Ja Ke Unse Keh De" and "Laagi Re Lagan Yehi Dil Mein" from the film Jalwa became prominent songs in Pakistan. In 1969, he wrote songs for films Nazneen and Andaleeb (1969).

=== Patriotic songs ===
In 1973, he wrote Pakistani film song "Tera Saya Jaha Bhi Ho, Palkein Bichhaaun" for Gharana film for which he was awarded a Nigar Award. His patriotic songs include "Is Parcham Ke Saye Taley Hum Eik Hain" and "Ye Watan Tumhara Hai".

== Death ==
He died on 28 August 2000 in Lahore and is buried in a cemetery of Lahore, Pakistan.

== Awards ==
| Year | Award | Category | Nominated work | Result | Ref. |
|---|---|---|---|---|---|
| —N/a | Nigar Awards | Best Lyricist | "Tere Sang Dosti Hum Na Chhoden Kabhi" from Zindagi (1978) | Won | |
| —N/a | Nigar Awards | Best Lyricist | "Tera Saya Jahan Bhi Ho Sajna, Palkein Bichhaun" from Gharana (1973) | Won | |
