= Zia Mohyeddin =

Pakistani-British actor (1931–2023)

Zia Mohyeddin HI SI
- ضیاء محی الدین
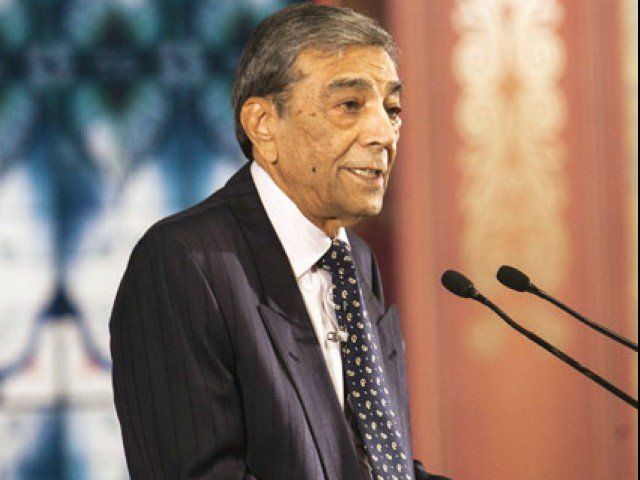
- Mohyeddin at a public gathering
- Born: 20 June 1931; Lyallpur, Punjab, British India
- Died: 13 February 2023 (aged 91); Karachi, Sindh, Pakistan
- Citizenship: Pakistan; United Kingdom
- Occupations: Actor; producer; broadcaster
- Years active: 1954 – 2023
- Title: Chairman of National Academy of Performing Arts, Karachi
- Spouse: Azra Bano Zaidi (m. 1994)
- Children: 4

Zia Mohyeddin (Note: Urdu: ضیاء محی الدین) (20 June 1931 – 13 February 2023) was a Pakistani and British actor and producer. Known for his distinctive voice, he is recognised as one of the greatest prose and poem reciters in the Urdu language, alongside also reciting in English. Mohyeddin served as the chairman of the National Academy of Performing Arts since its inception in 2005.

Born in Lyallpur, Punjab, he was trained at Royal Academy of Dramatic Art in London. He made his West End debut as Dr. Aziz in A Passage to India (1960) play. Mohyeddin made his film debut in Rahguzar (1960) and gained attention for his role as Tafas in Lawrence of Arabia (1962). He later appeared in Sammy Going South (1963), Behold a Pale Horse (1964) and Khartoum (1966). Mohyeddin became renowned for hosting his Pakistan Television talk show The Zia Mohyeddin Show (1969–1973).

Mohyeddin was also the author of three books; A Carrot is a Carrot (2008), Theatrics (2012) and The God of My Idolatry (2016). He was also known as one of the greatest prose recitors of the Urdu language. He died due to natural causes in Karachi in 2023.

== Early life and career ==
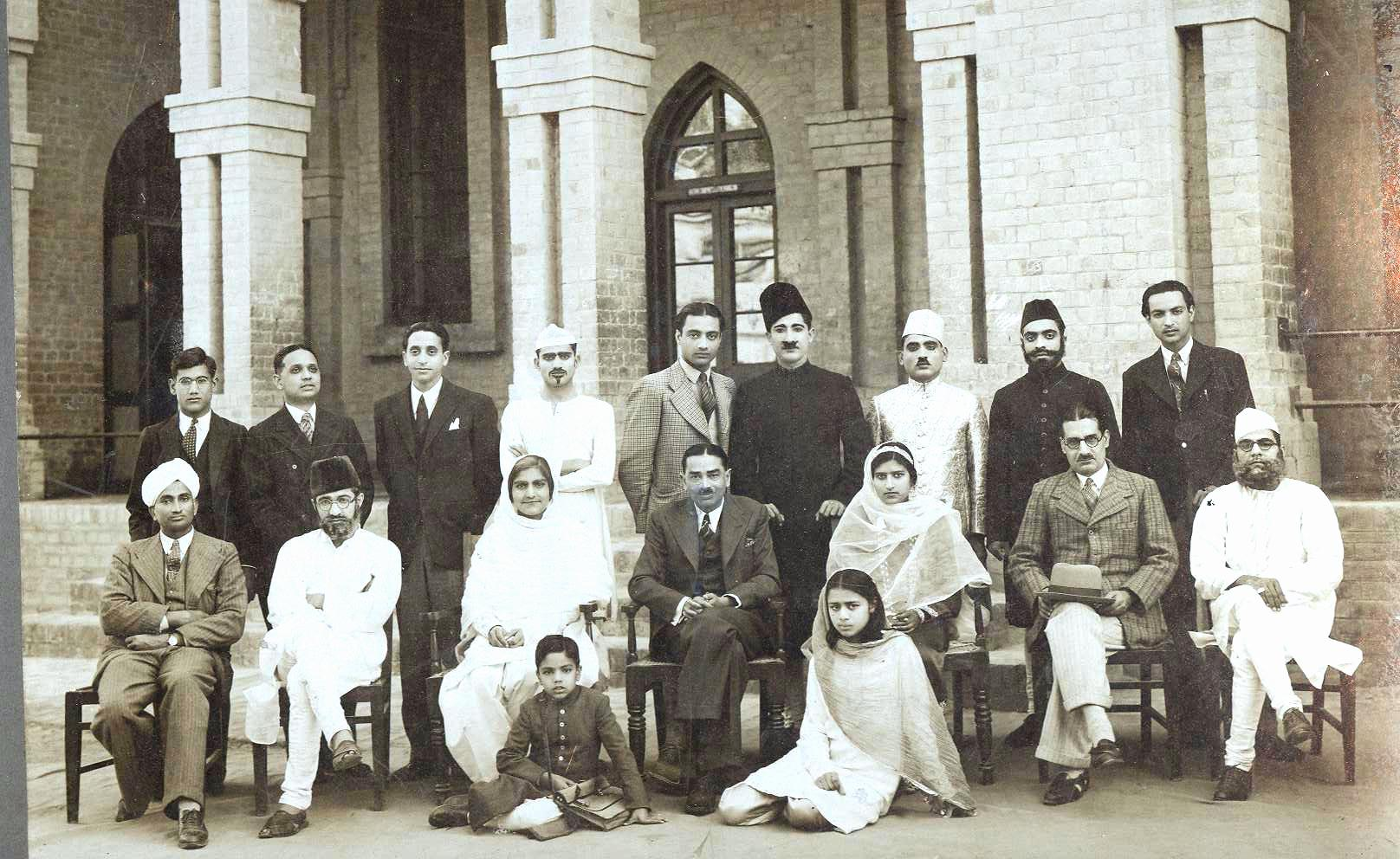
Mohyeddin at the age of 7 (on the floor, left) with the Central Training College Dramatic Club, Lahore, circa 1939. His father, Khadim Mohyeddin, is seated second from right.

Zia Mohyeddin was born in Lyallpur, Punjab, British India (now Faisalabad, Pakistan) belonging to the Chawla clan. His family had origins in Rohtak, Punjab, British India (now in Haryana, India). Zia Mohyeddin was fluent in four languages, Punjabi, Urdu, English and Persian.

His father, Khadim Mohyeddin, was a mathematician, musicologist, playwright, and lyricist associated with various theatre groups.

Zia spent his early life in Lahore, studying at the Government College, where he was a prize-winning Urdu debater for the college team. He later trained at the Royal Academy of Dramatic Art in London from 1953 to 1955. On his return to Pakistan, he produced, directed, and acted in numerous plays. After stage roles in Long Day's Journey into Night and Julius Caesar, he made his West End debut as Dr. Aziz in A Passage to India on 20 April 1960 at the Comedy Theatre. The production continued for 302 performances. He reprised this role in the 1965 BBC television adaptation as well. He made his film debut in Lawrence of Arabia (1962), playing the role of Tafas (the Arab guide who is shot by Omar Sharif for drinking water from the wrong well). He then made numerous TV and film appearances. As an actor, he worked for nearly 47 years in the United Kingdom.

His first wife was Sarwar Zemani with whom he had two sons, Minos Ameer and Risha Ameen.

== Return to Pakistan and later career ==
Mohyeddin returned to Pakistan in the late 1960s. Between 1969 and 1973, he hosted the popular television talk show The Zia Mohyeddin Show, best remembered for Mohyeddin's rap-style song segment, which he would introduce with his trademark phrase of "zara theka lagaiye". He was also appointed director of the PIA Arts Academy. Around this time, he met and subsequently married the renowned Kathak dancer Nahid Siddiqui. Together they had a son, the percussionist and music producer, Hassan "Moyo" Mohyeddin.

Following differences with the military regime of General Zia-ul-Haq, Mohyeddin returned to the United Kingdom in the late 1970s. During the 1980s Mohyeddin worked in Birmingham, UK, where he produced Central Television's flagship multicultural programme Here and Now (1986–1989), a weekly magazine program. He also produced and starred in the first soap opera with a British Asian cast, Family Pride (1991–1992).

While working in Britain in the 1980s, he was asked in an interview by a Pakistani news reporter whether he missed Pakistan. He replied that he did, that it was his home country, and that he missed his friends there and the people of Pakistan.

Mohyeddin then travelled the world giving Urdu poetry and prose recitations, as well as readings of English letters and literature. As a matter of practice, he emphasised that the metric structure of the entire poem must be studied by the reciter. He commented unfavourably on reciters who would habitually pause after every rhyming couplet, or "hammer" out the verses without regard for rhythm.

Mohyeddin married his third wife Azra Bano Zaidi in 1994. They had one daughter, Aaliya, who was born in 2002.

In February 2005, the then-president of Pakistan Pervez Musharraf invited Mohyeddin to form the National Academy of Performing Arts in Karachi, of which Mohyeddin was president since its inception.

Mohyeddin died on 13 February 2023, at the age of 91.

== Films ==
- Rahguzar (1960)
- Lawrence of Arabia (1962) – Tafas
- Sammy Going South (1963) – The Syrian
- Behold a Pale Horse (1964) – Luis, Guide of Paco
- Khartoum (1966) – Zobeir Pasha Al-Zubayr Rahma Mansur
- Deadlier Than the Male (1966) – King Fedra
- The Sailor from Gibraltar (1967) – Noori
- They Came from Beyond Space (1967) – Farge
- Work Is a Four-Letter Word (1968) – Dr. Aly Narayana
- Bombay Talkie (1970) – Hari
- Mujrim Kaun (1970) – Jamil (only lead role in a Lollywood movie)
- Suhag (1972)
- Ashanti (1979) – Djamil
- The Assam Garden (1985) – Mr. Lal
- Partition (1987)
- Immaculate Conception (1992) – Shehzada
- Some Lover to Some Beloved (documentary, 2017; Mohyeddin portrays himself)
- The Colour of My Heart (documentary, 2026; Mohyeddin portrays himself)

== Selected television appearances ==
- The Adventures of Sir Francis Drake (episode "Visit to Spain", 1962) – King Philip of Spain
- Danger Man (four episodes, 1964–1966) – Dr. Savari / Sinclair Jones / Mr. Sen / Khan
- The Avengers (episode "Honey for the Prince", 1966) – Prince Ali
- Adam Adamant Lives! (episode "The Basardi Affair", 1967) – Sheikh Abdul
- Jackanory (story "The Bird Talisman", 1967) – Storyteller
- Man in a Suitcase (episode "Night Flight to Andorra", 1968) – Rafael
- The Champions (episode "Shadow of the Panther", 1969) – Prengo
- Hadleigh (episode "Some You Win Some You Lose", 1969) – Major Savvas Stylianos
- Detective (episode "Hunt the Peacock", 1969) – Inspector Ghote
- Gangsters (four episodes, 1978) – Iqbal Khan
- Z-Cars (episode "Heavenly Host", 1978) – Anwar Chowdry
- Minder (episode "Diamonds Are a Girl's Worst Enemy", 1980) – Tajvir
- Death of a Princess (1980) – Marwan Shaheen
- The Jewel in the Crown (1984) – Mohammad Ali 'Mak' Kasim
- Bergerac (episode "A Touch of Eastern Promise", 1984) – Adnan Rashid
- Family Pride (1991–92) – Balbir "BB" Bedi
- Dhun Hamari Tumharay Naam Hui (1990s)

== Books ==
- A Carrot is a Carrot: Memories and Reflections, Ushba Publishing, Karachi, 2008
- Theatrics, National Academy of Performing Arts, Karachi, 2012
- The God of My Idolatry: Memories and Reflections, Pakistan Publishing House, Karachi, 2016

== Awards and recognition ==
- Hilal-i-Imtiaz in 2012 by the President of Pakistan.
- Sitara-i-Imtiaz in 2003 by the Government of Pakistan.
- Lifetime Achievement Award on 29 November 2017, presented by the Pakistani community living in Dubai & given by the Pakistan Ambassador in United Arab Emirates (UAE).
- Zia Mohyeddin Flyover, Gulistan-e-Johar 23 March 2023.
