= Naag Muni =

Pakistani supernatural musical romance film

- ناگ منی
- Directed by: Raza Mir
- Written by: Waheeda Naseem; Masroor Anwar; Ahmad Rahi; (dialogues)
- Screenplay by: Najam ul Hassan
- Based on: Naag Muni by Waheeda Naseem
- Produced by: Afzal Hussain; Raza Mir
- Starring: Waheed Murad; Rani; Sangeeta; Qavi; Masood Akhtar
- Music by: Nisar Bazmi
- Production company: United Workers
- Release date: 7 April 1972
- Country: Pakistan
- Language: Urdu

Naag Muni is a Pakistani supernatural musical romance film directed by Raza Mir. It stars Rani and Waheed Murad in leading roles. The music of the film was composed by Nisar Bazmi and songs by Noor Jehan, Mehdi Hassan and Ahmed Rushdi.

== Plot ==
A pharmaceutical researchers travels in a mysterious land with his colleague, where he comes across a native girl and falls for her. She too falls for him and they both face the difficulties afterwards, as the girl belongs to a tribe of serpent god.

The plot also deals with the theme of reincarnation.

== Cast ==
- Rani as Neera / Naag Muni
- Waheed Murad as Dr. Anwar / Rajkumar Surajiya
- Sangeeta as Bindiya
- Masood Akhtar as Sardar Anasha
- Qavi Khan as Dr. Khayal
- Agha Talish as Sardar Shanaka
- Rukhsana as Prema
- Saqi as Usama
- Najam ul Hassan as Maharaaj
- Jalil Afghani as Raajkumar

== Soundtrack ==
All music is composed by Nisar Bazmi.

Naag Muni
No.	Title	Lyrics	Singer (s)	Length
1.	"Aag Lagaye, Dil Tarpaye"	Habib Jalib	Ahmed Rushdi
2.	"Aaj Bhi Sooraj Doob Gaya Hai"	Masroor Anwar	Noor Jehan
3.	"Mann Mein Uthi Nayi Tarang"	Habib Jalib	Noor Jehan
4.	"Tann To Pe Warun"	Habib Jalib	Noor Jehan
5.	"Sanwaray, Moh Se Preet Nibhana Re"	Habib Jalib	Noor Jehan
6.	"Pag Lagay Dasi Darsh Ki Pyasi"	Habib Jalib	Noor Jehan and chorus
7.	"Mera Imaan Mohabbat Hai"	Habib Jalib	Mehdi Hassan
8.	"Jiya Tarsey, Naina Barsey"	Fayyaz Hashmi	Noor Jehan

== Release and reception ==
The film was released on 7 April 1972. It attained the silver jubilee status in Karachi. The film was also released in Portugal with a Portuguese dubbed version on 24 January 1979.

The Statesman gave the mixed review to the film regarding its direction and stoy, while praised the music.
