= Gunahon Ka Sheher =

2006 film

- DVD Cover
- Directed by: Saeed Ali Khan
- Produced by: Saeed Iqbal
- Starring: Ahmed Butt; Sana
- Music by: Humaira Arshad, Owais Malik
- Release date: 2006
- Country: Pakistan
- Language: Urdu

Gunahon Ka Sheher is a 2006 Pakistani Urdu language erotic film, directed by Pashto film director Saeed Ali Khan.

== Synopsis ==
The story of Aik Gunahoon Ka Shehr revolves around a young man (Ahmed Butt) fascinated by city life and the thrills it has to offer. Once there, unemployment eventually leads him to join a gang of blackmailers involved in sex crimes, in turn leading to his ruin.

== Controversy ==
When the team of Aik Gunahoon Ka Shehr approached the Pakistan Film Censor Board for a clearance certificate, objection was raised over the phrase Gunahoon Ka Shehr. Later the name was modified to Aik Gunahoon Ka Shehr. What exactly they aimed to achieve by this is still a mystery.

Secondly, the members of the respected censor board charged that the film contained erotic scenes and dialogue. Consequently, the film appeared before a full board who chopped off several scenes and dialogues which they considered ‘unnecessary’ and ‘irrelevant’, resulting in the producer reshooting them. Annoyed, producer Saeed Iqbal presented his stand before the censor board members, stating that the story of the film depicts the true picture of youth today who indulge in sex and crime.

"The objection was unfair because already a number of Pakistani, Indian and English movies with sexual content are being exhibited at cinemas and cable networks throughout the country," he said. He further confessed that it is not a family film. "Who likes to watch a family film in our dingy cinema houses? This is an era of love, romance, sex and action all packaged as one," he explained.

== Music ==
The best part of the film is its music composed by Humaira Arshad and Awais Malik. Here viewers are hoping that the musicians signal healthy changes in film music, too. Saeed Ali Khan, the director called for Ahmed Butt originally, but then there was an easy access to his wife for the singing, she was more than happy to make her debut in Lollywood as a composer.

== Cast ==
- Ahmed Butt
- Sana
- Saima Khan (Mujra dancer)
- Fakhar Imam (Sana's husband)
