= Aag Ka Darya (film) =

- آگ کا دریا
- Directed by: Humayun Mirza
- Screenplay by: Riaz Shahid
- Story by: Riaz Shahid
- Produced by: Amanullah Khan
- Starring: Shamim Ara; Mohammed Ali
- Cinematography: Raza Mir
- Music by: Abdul Latif; Ghulam Nabi
- Production company: Films D. Orient
- Release date: 24 January 1966
- Country: Pakistan
- Language: Urdu

Aag Ka Darya (transl. The river of the fire) is a 1966 Pakistani black and white film, directed by Humayun Mirza. The dialogues and the story writer was Riaz Shahid, with cinematography by Raza Mir. It stars Shamim Ara and Mohammed Ali in leading roles. An unofficial remake of the 1963 Hindi film Mujhe Jeene Do, it revolves around a bandit and a dancing girl. The film features songs and milli naghmay by Noor Jehan, Naseem Begum, Mala Begum, Irene Parveen, Saleem Raza, Ahmad Rushdi and Masood Rana. Aag Ka Darya is one of the few films for which the poetry is done by the renowned Urdu poet, Josh Malihabadi. Theatrically released on 24 January 1966, the film was a commercially successful film of the year, it was released. The film received praise due to its cinematography but was criticised for copied the plot, and is known for its Nigar Award-winning music and national songs. It became a landmark in Ali's career, establishing him as one of the leading actors of the Pakistani cinema.

At the annual Nigar Awards, it won in 4 categories, including best actor for Ali, best lyricist for Malihabadi and best cinematographer for Mir.

== Plot ==
The plot revolves around a bandit and a dancer girl who falls for each other, and yells at the same due to other's deeds. The legal authorities tries to catch the bandit but he manages to escape every time. After the birth of her son, the girl wants a safe and sound future for the son while on the other hand, the bandit also wants to give up his this life for which she helps him.

== Cast ==
- Muhammad Ali
- Shamim Ara
- Lehri
- Saqi
- Fazal Haq
- M. Ismail
- Nasira
- Salma Mumtaz
- Chham Chham

== Music ==
All lyrics are written by Josh Malihabadi; all music is composed by Ghulam Nabi and Abdul Latif.

No.	Title	Singer (s)	Length
1.	"Aye watan hum hain teri shama ke parwano mein"	Masood Rana
2.	"Aye sarkar-e-madina"	Noor Jehan
3.	"Hawa se moti baras rhe hain"	Noor Jehan
4.	"Mann ja balam, na thukra mera pyar"	Noor Jehan
5.	"Ya Rab, yeh balaon mein giraftar"	Noor Jehan
6.	"Ghanghor andhera hai, khamoshi ka sama hai"	Noor Jehan & Saleem Raza
7.	"Balma, aaya moray dwaray"	Mala Begum
8.	"Kheiton peh dekho, kesi chhai bahar"	Ahmed Rushdi, Irene Parveen & chorus
9.	"Raat aayi to saqi ne bri dhoom macha di"	Naseem Begum & chorus

== Release and reception ==
Aag Ka Darya was released on 24 January 1966. The film celebrated its Silver jubilee in the Karachi circuit.

In November 2017, it was screened at the Lok Virsa Museum to showcase the historical film records.

=== Critical reception ===
In his book "Pakistan Cinema, 1947–1997", film critic Mushtaq Gazdar praised the cinematography for the depiction of rural and urban Sindh, despite its resemblance with Bollywood flicks Gunga Jumna and Mujhe Jeene Do.

== Awards ==
Year	Award	Category	Awardee	Result	Ref.
1966	Nigar Awards	Best Actor	Muhammad Ali	Won	
1966	Nigar Awards	Best Lyricist	Josh Malihabadi	Won	
1966	Nigar Awards	Best Cinematographer	Raza Mir	Won	
1966	Nigar Awards	Best Playback female singer	Noor Jehan	Won	
