= Badar uz Zaman =

Pakistani musicologist (1940–2023)

Ustad Badar uz Zaman
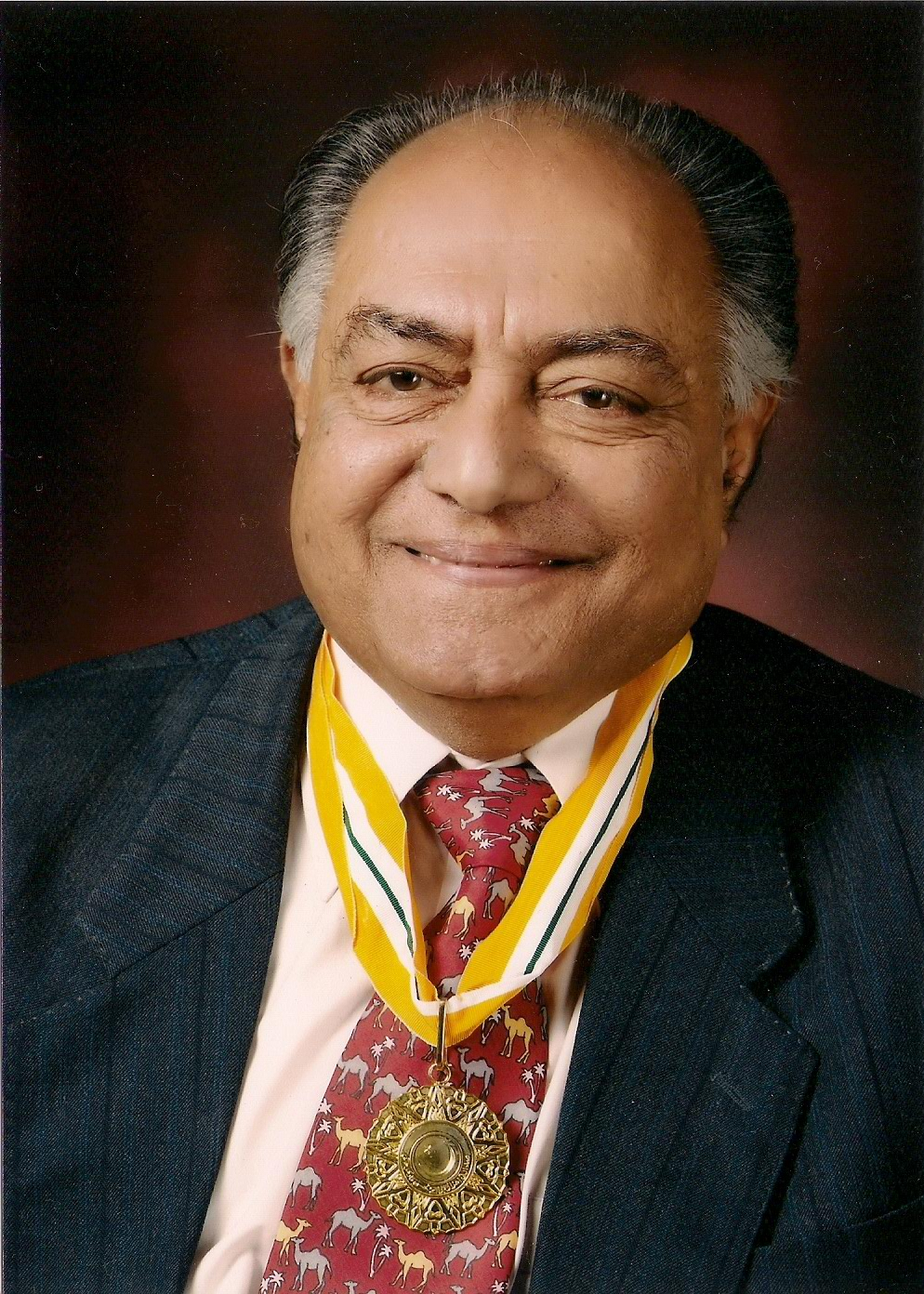
- Born: 21 April 1940
- Died: 1 December 2023 (aged 83); Lahore, Punjab, Pakistan
- Occupations: Pakistani classical and Khyal singing, musicologist
- Years active: 1956–2023
- Awards: Pride of Performance Award by the President of Pakistan (2006)

Pride of Performance Award Recipient
- Date: 23 March 2006
- Country: Islamic Republic of Pakistan
- Presented by: Islamic Republic of Pakistan

Badar uz Zaman (21 April 1940 – 1 December 2023) was a Pakistani classical singer. He contributed to Pakistani classical music by promoting and re-interpreting compositions of the sub-continent's Muslim composers. Zaman performed with his brother, Ustad Qamar-uz-Zaman, carrying forward Pakistan's own "Kasur Gharana" traditions of the art of Khayal music. Classical singers typically represent Indian Gharanas of music.

== Early life and education ==
Badar uz Zaman was born on 21 April 1940. Zaman came from a wealthy family of Lahore cloth merchants. He was educated in Pakistan at the University of the Punjab, Lahore, earning a bachelor's degree in music, and M.A. degree in political science.

== Career ==
Zaman started his music career in 1956. Pervaiz Shami introduced him to debut on Radio Pakistan. He served the Punjab Council of the Arts as Deputy Director Drama and Resident Director, Faisalabad, Sargodha and D.G Khan Arts Councils. As of 2012 Zaman was attached as Associate Professor to the Music Department, University of the Punjab Lahore.

He received music training from Ustad Faiz Ali (Gawaliyar), Ustad Iftikhar Ahmed Khan (Delhi), Ustad Chhotay Ghulam Ali Khan (Qasur) and Ustad Bhai Naseera (Punjab). In composing of film songs, he was affiliated with the renowned Pakistani music director Nisar Bazmi for 18 years. He was active in music for about 56 years, singing Khayal, Thumris, Dadra, and Ghazal.

Zaman remained active as a music performer in later life, particularly in partnership with his brother, Ustad Qamar-uz-Zaman. Described as the "more articulate of the two", Badar uz Zaman expressed views on topics including India-Pakistan cultural exchange, and the 2011 arrest of singer Rahat Fateh Ali Khan.

== Death ==
Badar uz Zaman died on 1 December 2023, at the age of 83.

== Books ==
Zaman authored, translated, researched and edited several books on music, such as:

- Nawa-e-Mosiqi,
- Taal Sagar,
- Sada Rang,
- Tohfa-tul-hind,
- Ramoz-e-Sitar
- Punjab ki classiki moosiqi ko ataa Tappa
- Muarif-ul-Naghmaat (Part 1, Part 2 and part 3)
- Sada-e-Mausiqui

His books Nawa-e-Mosiqi, Taal Sagar and Sada Rang have been translated into Hindi, English and Gurmukhi and are being taught in Pakistani and Indian universities.

== Awards ==
Zaman was awarded a number of honours/awards including:

- Graduate Award 1974–75 & 1975–76,
- PTV Best Classical Singer Award 1982,
- Ahang-e-Khusravi, KH. Khurshid Anwer Award 1987,
- K.L.Saigol Award 1991,
- Aitaraf-e-Fun Award 1999.
- PBC National Excellence Award for Classical Singer 14 April 2001.
- Best Sufi Singer Award at Chandi Garh 2007.
- Sada-e-Sufi Award Ludhiana 2007.
- President of Pakistan Award for Pride of Performance (23 March 2006)
- Unique Award for Serving Punjabi Music 2013 (by Govt of Indian Punjab)
- Nazakat Salamat Award by Sham Churasi Circle and PNCA (2014)
- Muslim League Golden Jubilee Award for Best Services of Classical Music (19 March 1999)
- Aetraf-e-Fun Award in Recognition of 40 Years Music Services, Multan (26 March 2000)
- Aetraf-e-Husn-e-Karkardagi Award by Faran Homeopathic College and Sargodha Art Council (16 May 2015)
- Best Music Judge Award, Inter-Collegiate Music Competition (1964)
- Ameer Khushro Award in Pakistan Music Festival, Lahore (25 November 1979)
- Punjab Youth Academy, Faisalabad Best Light Singer Award (1982)
- Gliders Best Composer Award, Faisalabad (1984)
- Pakistan Hilal-e-Ahmar Award (1985)
- Aahang-e-Khusrovi Khaja Khursheed Anwar Gold Medal for Best Classical Singer (1987)
- Awarded Gold Medal for the Best Services in the field of Classical Music (1990)
- Gold Medal Easter Music Festival, Lahore (10 April 1979)
- Best Classical Singer Award by Bishop of Pakistan, Jonathan Rehmat and Eugene John (2 April 2009)
- Ameer Khusro Award by Melody Festival (2012)
- Husn-e-Karkardagi Award (16 January 2005)
- Best Singer Award by IGM, Lahore (2002)
- Best Keertankar Award by Chief Adviser Shiromani Gurdwara Parbandhak Committee Balbeer Singh, Harbhajan Singh and Jaswant Singh (16 May 2007)
- Sada-e-Sufi Award, Ludhiana (21 May 2007)

== Dabistan-e-Khusru Badar uz Zaman Music School ==
Badar uz Zaman was recognized with Pakistan's first-ever music academy being named after him. The Jadeed Foundation named their music school after him, describing him as a "legendary classical musician of Pakistan."

Zaman's contributions toward the preservation and promotion of classical music in Pakistan and sole entity representing Kasur Gharana are recognised all over the Indian subcontinent.
