= Kabhi Pyar Na Karna =

- Directed by: Javed Raza
- Written by: Ahmed Aqeel Ruby
- Produced by: Khawaja Tariq Tahir
- Starring: Zara Sheikh; Moammar Rana; Neha Dhupia; Veena Malik; Shamyl Khan; Naghma
- Cinematography: Waqar Bokhari
- Edited by: Ashfaq Makrani
- Music by: Amjad Bobby; Humaira Arshad
- Distributed by: Eveready Pictures
- Release date: 18 April 2008
- Country: Pakistan
- Language: Urdu

Kabhi Pyar Na Karna is a Pakistani Urdu film directed by Javed Raza. The film was produced by Khawaja Tariq Tahir and it is written by Ahmed Aqeel Ruby. Zara Sheikh, Veena Malik and Moammar Rana perform leading roles in this film. Bollywood actress Neha Dhupia made her Pakistani film debut. Kabhi Pyar Na Karna was distributed by Eveready Pictures and was released on 18 April 2008.

== Cast ==
- Zara Sheikh
- Moammar Rana
- Neha Dhupia
- Veena Malik
- Shamyl Khan
- Naghma

== Production ==
The film was shot in the United States and Pakistan. Bollywood actress Neha Dhupia made her Pakistani film debut

== Release ==
The film was released nationwide on 18 April 2008.
