= Shamim Ejaz =

Pakistani newscaster

- Born: Qudsia Begum; 6 September 1923; Hyderabad, Telangana, British India
- Died: 8 July 2009 (aged 85); Karachi, Sindh, Pakistan
- Education: Osmania University
- Occupations: Newscaster; Writer
- Years active: 1942–2006
- Children: 2
- Parent(s): Muhammad Fasiuddin (father); Aziz-Un-Nisa (mother)
- Relatives: Waheeda Naseem (sister); Ejaz Hussain Alvi (grandfather)

Shamim Ejaz was a Pakistani newscaster and radio newsreader at Pakistan Television Corporation.

== Early life ==
Shamim was born on 6 September 1923 in Hyderabad at Telangana during British India. She was the elder sister of Waheeda Naseem. Her mother Aziz-Un-Nisa and grandfather Ejaz Hussain Alvi were both poets and writers.

She completed her education from Osmania University and graduated with a degree in Arts.

== Career ==
Shamim used to write short stories and novels before she joined Radio Station Hyderabad later during her studies she joined Radio Hyderabad. In 1951 her parents migrated to Pakistan and settled in Karachi then she worked as an air hostess at Pakistan International Airlines. Then she joined Radio Pakistan Karachi and auditioned for announcer then she was selected for newsreader.

In 1965 she announced Pakistan presidential election on both Radio and PTV which were won by Muhammad Ayub Khan. The same year she was promoted to newsreader and during the war she was associated with news wing of Radio Pakistan along with Shakeel Ahmed and announced the news of Indo-Pakistani War of 1965 and events of Kashmir.

After the war in 1960s she hosted a show called For Military Brothers which was about the soldiers the show became popular among the army. In 1970s she worked as newscaster and read news at PTV Khabarnama on PTV.

In 1980s she worked for radio Deutsche Welle in Germany. Then she came back to Pakistan and worked at both Radio and PTV for forty years.

In 2006 she retired from Radio and PTV then she worked on contracts for Radio.

== Personal life ==
Shamim was married and had two children and her younger sister Waheeda Naseem was a poet and writer.

== Death ==
Shamim died on 8 July 2009 at Karachi, Pakistan and was buried near her sister's grave at Model Colony graveyard in Karachi.

== Filmography ==
=== News presentations ===
Year	Title	Role	Network
1965	For Military Brothers	Host	Radio Pakistan
1969	Urdu Khabrein	Newscaster	Radio Pakistan
1970	PTV Khabarnama	Newscaster	PTV

== Awards and nominations ==
Year	Award	Category	Result	Title	Ref.
1999	Tamgha-e-Imtiaz	Award by the President of Pakistan	Nominated	Arts	
