= Seema (1963 film) =

- Directed by: S.A. Bukhari
- Written by: Anwar Batalvi
- Produced by: Shamim Ashraf Malik
- Starring: Shamim Ara; Santosh Kumar; Talish; Sultan; Panna
- Cinematography: Raza Mir
- Music by: Master Inayat Hussain
- Release date: 25 October 1963
- Country: Pakistan
- Language: Urdu

Seema is a 1963 Pakistani film directed by S.A. Bukhari in his directorial debut. The story writer was Anwar Batalvi and the cinematographer was Raza Mir. The film stars Shamim Ara in the titular role, as a headstrong and possessive lover. It also stars Santosh Kumar, Sultan, Talish and Panna. The music was composed by Master Inayat Hussain.

== Plot ==
Seema's father is a heart patient and he decides to marry her with his cardiologist, Masood. Seema who loves Shahid, the famous poet of the country does not want to marry him on his father's wish. Due to her love for him, she succeeds in marrying him. Her possessiveness towards Shahid usually creates problems between her and Shahid. After her pregnancy, Shahid goes to a lonely place to complete the collection of his poetry, to which she thinks that he has gone leaving her behind forever. But after a few days, on his arrival she argues with him and leaves for Masood to asks for aborting her unborn. She goes to Masood's house who tries to convince her not to abort. He goes to drop her off at her house where Shahid gets caught with an accident due to fire in the house.

== Cast ==
- Shamim Ara as Seema
- Santosh Kumar as Shahid
- Sultan
- Talish
- Panna
- Asad Jafri
- Sikandar
- Emi Menuwala
- Nighat Sultana as Begum (cameo)

== Music ==
All music is composed by Master Inayat Hussain.

Seema
No.	Title	Lyrics	Singer (s)	Length
1.	"Shaam-e-gham Phir Aageyi"	Arif Razmi	Saleem Raza
2.	"Aye Meri Jaan-e-ghazal Kyun Na Teri Chahat Karun"	Qateel Shifai	Saleem Raza
3.	"Aa Dilbar, Sanam, Tujh Ko Bulayen Hum"	Qateel Shifai	Saleem Raza, Naheed Niazi
4.	"Bhool Jao Ge Tum, Kar Ke Waada"	Habib Jalib	Saleem Raza
5.	"Sayyan Re, Balma Re, Balma Lage Re"	Tanvir Naqvi	Naheed Niazi
6.	"Shama Bhuj Geyi Hai"	Tanvir Naqvi	Saleem Raza

== Reception ==
A reviewer from The Illustrated Weekly of Pakistan noted Shamim Ara's acting as many of the plus points of the movie.

== Awards ==
At annual Nigar Awards, the film won two awards.

Category	Recipient
Best Cinematography	Raza Mir
Best Playback Singer (male)	Saleem Raza
