= Chalo Ishq Larain =

Pakistani film

- Poster
- Directed by: Hassan Askari
- Produced by: Sajjad Gul
- Starring: Meera; Zara Sheikh; Ali Haider; Sabira Sultana
- Music by: Sajid Hussain
- Release date: April 2002
- Country: Pakistan
- Language: Urdu

Chalo Ishq Larain is a Pakistani film directed by Hassan Askari, which was released across Pakistan in April 2002, starring Meera, Ali Haider and Zara Sheikh.

== Cast ==
- Zara Sheikh
- Meera
- Ali Haider
- Sabira Sultana
- Imran Khan

== Awards ==
Ceremony	Category	Recipient	Result
2nd Lux Style Awards	Best Film Actress	Zara Sheikh	Nominated
