= Sabira Sultana =

Pakistani actress (born 1945)

- Born: Rabia Begum; 21 December 1945 (age 80); Bombay, British India (present day Mumbai, India)
- Other names: Statue of Marble; Queen of Beauty
- Occupations: Actress; Model
- Years active: 1960–2002
- Children: 1

Sabira Sultana (born 21 December 1945), also known as Statue of Marble, is a Pakistani actress and model. Considered one of the leading actresses of the "golden era" of Pakistani cinema, Sabira was among the leading actresses of the 1960s and 1970s. Active from the 1960s to 2002, she was known for her beauty and versatility, portraying a range of characters from romantic leads to supporting and character roles in Urdu, Punjabi, and Pashto films.

== Early life and education ==
She was born in Bombay, British India (present-day Mumbai), to a conservative Kashmiri family; her birth name was Rabia Begum. After the partition of India her parents migrated to Lahore. Influenced by her sophisticated personality, her friends encouraged her to enter the film industry. Sultana had a strong educational background. After her acting career, she became deeply involved in running her own girls' school in Lahore.

== Career ==
=== Debut and success (1960s) ===
Sultana began her career in the early 1960s with supporting roles. She made her debut in a supporting role in Urdu film Insaf and her acting was praised by the critics which was released in 1960 the film was a box office hit it achieve silver jubilee success. In 1964, she received her first leading roles in the romantic dramas Jamila and Shukria. The following year, she earned critical acclaim for her powerful portrayal of a character from youth to old age in the family drama Kaneez, which established her as a respected actress. She delivered other memorable performances in films like Aadil (1966) and the blockbuster Saiqa (1968), and was nicknamed the "Queen of Beauty" by fans.

=== Critically acclaimed roles (1970s) ===
Her career continued successfully into the 1970s with roles in films like Chand Suraj (1970) and Chiragh Kahan Roshni Kahan (1971). In 1975, she played her first and only villainous role in the film Bemisaal. Sultana also acted in several Pashto-language films during this decade, beginning with the successful Ajab Khan Afridi in 1971.

=== Hiatus and comeback ===
Following her appearance in Bemisaal, Sultana took a hiatus from the film industry. In 1990, she moved to television and appeared in drama Bore Ke Lado later in 1991 then she worked in drama Main Aur Bhai Jaan both dramas were aired on PTV. She returned in 1992, transitioning to character and elderly roles. During the 1990s, she also worked as a model for various brands including Gul Ahmed Lawn and other lawn manufacturers also in advertisements. Her final film role was in Chalo Ishq Larain in 2002.

Throughout her career, Sabira Sultana appeared in over 65 films across Urdu, Punjabi, and Pashto languages. Her ability to adapt to different roles and perform with a versatile range cemented her legacy in Lollywood.

== Personal life ==
Sultana is married and has one daughter.

In 2022, Sultana appealed to the government for recognition of her services to Pashto cinema. In November 2025, she received financial assistance from Punjab Chief Minister Maryam Nawaz due to her illness.

== Filmography ==
=== Television ===
Year	Title	Role	Network
1990	Bore Ke Lado	Shaista	PTV
1991	Main Aur Bhai Jaan	Begum Sahiba	PTV

=== Film ===
Year	Title	language	Ref.
1960	Insaf	Urdu	
1960	Dil Kis ko Doon	Urdu	
1961	Tum Na Mano	Urdu	
1963	Yahudi Ki Larki	Urdu	
1964	Shukria	Urdu	
1964	Jamila	Urdu	
1964	Maa Ka Pyar	Urdu	
1964	Choti Behan	Urdu	
1965	Bahu Begun	Urdu	
1965	Nargis	Urdu	
1965	Eid Mubarak	Urdu	
1965	Umar Qaid	Urdu	
1965	Mujahid	Urdu	
1965	Kaneez	Urdu	
1966	Moajza	Urdu	
1966	Mera Salaam	Urdu	
1966	Aadil	Urdu	
1966	Khalifa	Urdu	
1966	Insaan	Urdu	
1966	Naghma-e-Sehra	Urdu	
1967	Elaan	Urdu	
1967	Musafir	Urdu	
1967	Burma Road	Urdu	
1967	Shaam Savera	Urdu	
1968	14 Saal	Urdu	
1968	Shareek-e-Hayat	Urdu	
1968	Sonay Ki Chirya	Urdu	
1968	Saiqa	Urdu	
1968	Taj Mahal	Urdu	
1969	Buzdil	Urdu	
1969	Dil De Ke Dekho	Urdu	
1970	Takht Aur Taj	Urdu	
1970	Ansoo Ban Gaye Moti	Urdu	
1970	Kahin Deep Jale Kahin Dil	Urdu	
1970	Naureen	Urdu	
1970	Chand Suraj	Urdu	
1971	Gharnata	Urdu	
1971	Charagh Kahan Roshni Kahan	Urdu	
1971	Ajab Khan Afridi	Pashto	
1972	Badlay Gi Dunya Sathi	Urdu	
1972	Suhag	Urdu	
1972	Dil Ek Aina	Urdu	
1973	Farz	Urdu	
1973	Sarhad Ki Gaud Mein	Urdu	
1973	Naya Rasta	Urdu	
1973	Melma	Pashto	
1973	Zakhmi	Urdu	
1973	Rangeela Aur Munawwar Zarif	Urdu	
1974	Jang Aw Aman	Pashto	
1974	Intezar	Urdu	
1974	Wotan Mena	Urdu	
1974	Mastani Mehbooba	Urdu	
1975	Bemisaal	Urdu	
1992	Hero	Urdu / Punjabi	
1996	Kelona	Urdu	
1997	Mard Jeenay Nahi Dete	Urdu	
1997	Chand Girhan	Urdu	
1999	Qismat	Urdu	
2000	Bali Jatti	Punjabi	
2000	Jagg Mahi	Punjabi	
2000	Sharang Da Bangroo	Pashto	
2000	Tere Pyar Mein	Urdu	
2001	Janwar	Urdu	
2002	Chalo Ishq Larain	Urdu	
