= Lakhon Mein Aik =

1967 film

- Poster
- Urdu: لاکھوں میں ایک
- Directed by: Raza Mir
- Written by: Zia Sarhadi
- Produced by: Afzal Hussain; Raza Mir
- Starring: Shamim Ara; Ejaz
- Cinematography: Kamran Mirza
- Edited by: Rehmat Ali
- Music by: Nisar Bazmi
- Production company: United Workers
- Release date: 28 April 1967
- Country: Pakistan
- Language: Urdu

Lakhon Mein Aik (Hindustani pronunciation: [laːkʰoːn meːn eːk] transl. One in a million) is a 1967 Pakistani romantic drama film directed by Raza Mir and written by Zia Sarhadi. Set 20 years after the partition of India, the film stars Shamim Ara and Ejaz as star-crossed lovers. It was released on 28 April 1967 and became a commercial success, winning six Nigar Awards including Best Actress for Ara.

== Plot ==
In 1947, following the partition of India, communal riots emerge in Kashmir. A Hindu family tries to flee to India but is accidentally separated from their young daughter, Shakuntala. Shakuntala and a Muslim boy Mahmood fall in love but then they are separated and feel agony at that time.

== Cast ==
- Shamim Ara as Shakuntala
  - Baby Sabrina as Shakuntala (young)
- Ejaz as Mahmood / Dildar Khan
  - Master Mahmood as Dildar Khan (young)
- Talish as Ahmed Ali
- Saqi as Dilbar Khan
- Mustafa Qureshi as Madhu Sudhan Laal

== Production ==
In Bollywood, Zia Sarhadi was known for his films Hum Log (1951) and Foothoath (1953). After his migration to Pakistan, he wrote the story of Lakhon Mein Aik, based on a cross-border romance. Mustafa Qureshi made his debut with this film. He was approached by Mir to play the villainous role in the film, when Mir spotted him during the filming of Aag Ka Darya (1966).

== Themes ==
Lakhon Mein Aik is set 20 years after the partition of India which happened in 1947, though historian Karan Bali notes that the events of 1947 "play a key role in kick-starting the doomed Indo-Pak love story". He also considers that though Pakistani people view the film as unbiased and balanced, from an Indian perspective it "does not really appear quite as so" since the majority of Muslim characters are portrayed as sympathetic, and "every Hindu, barring the heroine and her father, is seen as negative or evil".

== Soundtrack ==
The soundtrack was composed by Nisar Bazmi.

Track listing
No.	Title	Lyrics	Singer(s)	Length
1.	"Bari Mushkil Say Hua Tera Mera Sath Piya"	Tanvir Naqvi	Noor Jehan
2.	"Challo Achha Hua Tum Bhool Gaye, Ik Bhool Hi Tha Mera Pyar"	Fayyaz Hashmi	Noor Jehan
3.	"Dil Diya Dard Liya, Ankh Mein Aansoo Aye"	Masroor Anwar	Mehdi Hassan
4.	"Halaat Badal Nahin Saktay, In Rahon Mein Bhi Jeevan Bhar"	Masroor Anwar	Noor Jehan
5.	"Ho, Sun Saajna, Dukhi Mann Ki Pukar, Hua Vairi Sansar"	Masroor Anwar	Noor Jehan
6.	"Mann Mandar Kay Devta, Rakhio Laaj Hamari"	Fayyaz Hashmi	Noor Jehan, Chorus
7.	"Pyar Na Ho Jab Dil Mein To Jeena Hay Adhoora"	Tanvir Naqvi	Naseem Begum, Ahmed Rushdi
8.	"Sathi Kahan Ho, Awaz To Do, Pal Pal Mera Pyar Pukaray"	Tanvir Naqvi	Noor Jehan, Mujeeb Alam

== Release and reception ==
Lakhon Mein Aik was released on 28 April 1967, and became a commercial success. In 2017, the film was screened at the Mandwa Film Club in Lok Virsa Museum, Islamabad.

Filmman of The Statesman said it "does make a departure from the general run of Urdu films but somehow clings to the hackneyed twists and turns.

== Accolades ==
The film won in six categories at the Pakistani Nigar Awards:

- Best Actress for Shamim Ara
- Best Supporting Actor for Saqi
- Best Sound
- Best Camera work
- Best Female Singer for Noor Jehan
- Best Lyricist for Fayyaz Hashmi.

== Legacy and impact ==
Lakhon Mein Aik was the debut film of Mustafa Qureshi, it launched his career in Urdu films after which he went on to become a famous star of the Punjabi films. Along with Saheli and Saiqa, Lakhon Mein Aik is considered as the best performance of Shamim Ara.

The cross-border romance theme of Lakhon Mein Aik later inspired the Indian filmmaker Raj Kapoor with the idea of the film Henna (1991), and may be a source of inspiration for Gadar: Ek Prem Katha (2001) and Veer-Zaara (2004). The film was adapted by Sangeeta as a television series which aired on TV One in 2009 starting Babar Ali and Noor.

In an article of The Express Tribune, actor Jawed Sheikh recommended the film for its powerful performances and hit musical score.

BBC Urdu included it among the "Top ten best films of the Pakistani cinema", selected by critic Aijaz Gul. The film was also named among another list by Gul, "Top Ten Films" as published by Cinemaya in 2000.
