= Waheeda Naseem =

Pakistani writer

- Born: Faheeda Naseem Begum; 9 October 1927; Hyderabad, Telangana, British India
- Died: 28 October 1996 (aged 69); Karachi, Sindh, Pakistan
- Education: Osmania University
- Occupations: Writer; Poet; Teacher
- Years active: 1948–1996
- Children: 3
- Parent(s): Muhammad Fasiuddin (father); Aziz-Un-Nisa (mother)
- Relatives: Shamim Ejaz (sister); Ejaz Hussain Alvi (grandfather)

Waheeda Naseem, also known as Naseem, was a Pakistani novelist, poet, short story writer and fiction writer.

== Early life ==
Waheeda was born on 9 October 1927 in Hyderabad at Telangana during British India. She was the younger sister of Shamim Ejaz. Her mother Aziz-Un-Nisa and her maternal grandfather Ejaz Hussain Alvi, who were also poets and writers, encouraged her to write.

She completed her education from Osmania University and graduated with MSC in Botany in 1951.

== Career ==
Waheeda started writing short stories from an early age after she was encouraged by her mother. After finishing her studies then in 1952 her family migrated to Pakistan and settled at Karachi later she joined the education department and used to teach botany which was her profession later she became principal of Government College Science for Women at Nazimabad and later she retired in 1987. She wrote 24 Urdu novels and short stories.

Waheeda also wrote several dramas for Pakistan Television Corporation. In 1972 she wrote Naag Muni a supernatural musical film based on her novel it had Waheed Murad, Rani and Sangeeta in lead roles the film was a silver jubilee hit at the box office.

She became popular because of her poetry and fiction stories. She wrote several books including Moji Naseem, Naat wa Salam, Marsiya Kakuri, Naag Mani, Raj Mahal, Rang Mahal and Deep. The most well known stories she wrote are Aurangabad, From Malik Anbar to Aurangzeb, Woman and Urdu Language, Shahan Hai Taj, Dastaan Dur Dastaan, Sahil Ki Tamnna, Gham Dil Kahe Na Jaye, Shabu Rani and Zakhum Hayat.

== Personal life ==
Waheeda was married and had three children and her elder sister Shamim Ejaz was a newscaster.

== Death ==
Waheeda died on 28 October 1996 in Karachi, Pakistan and was buried at Model Colony graveyard in Karachi.

== Filmography ==
=== Writer ===
Year	Title	Notes
1972	Naag Muni	Writer

=== Television series ===
Year	Title	Notes
1992	Hasina-E-Alam	Writer
2003	Sahil Ki Tamanna	Writer
