= Mein Ek Din Laut Kay Aaoon Ga =

- Directed by: Mohammad Javed Fazil
- Written by: Mohammad Javed Fazil
- Produced by: Shoaib Alam; Asif Jan
- Starring: Humayun Saeed; Ahmed Butt; Nadeem; Pooja Kanwal; Javed Sheikh; Saba Hameed
- Cinematography: Ramesh Krishna
- Edited by: Zafar Sultan
- Music by: Jawad Ahmad
- Production companies: SuperMusicMasti UK; Geo Films
- Distributed by: Geo Films
- Release date: 1 August 2007
- Running time: 158 min
- Country: Pakistan
- Language: Urdu
- Box office: Rs. 2 crore (US$72,000)

Mein Ek Din Laut Kay Aaoon Ga (Urdu: میں ایک دن لوٹ کے آؤں گا) is a 2007 Pakistani Lollywood Urdu-language film starring Humayun Saeed, Nadeem, Nausheen Ali Sardar, Pooja Kanwal and Javed Sheikh. The film was directed by Mohammad Javed Fazil. It was Fazil's last film before his death in 2010, and was mostly shot in Hyderabad, India.

The film was released on 22 August 2007 in the UK. It was reportedly inspired by the Indian film Karz.

== Plot ==
Zoheb (Ahmed Butt) runs his late father's business with the help of Mr. Khan (Javed Sheikh). His mother, Mrs. Haroon (Saba Hameed), is busy preparing for her daughter's wedding while also on the lookout for a suitable match for her son. Meanwhile, Zoheb chances to meet Sheeza (Pooja Kanwal) two songs later, falls madly in love with her and marries her without his mother's consent. But, once she finds out, Saba's character asks her son to bring his wife home. While driving back home with his bride, Zoheb is pushed over a cliff by Sheeza.

Hence, the first twist – Sheeza is actually Mr. Khan's daughter, who had suffered insult at the hands of Zoheb's father when the latter refused to give him his share in the business. Sheeza married the son to avenge her father's mistreatment, and the father-daughter duo then force Zoheb's family out of the house and forcibly take possession of all the property.

But unknown to the Khans, Zoheb survives the fall at the cost of having his face mutilated. Enters his savior, plastic surgeon Dr Azim (Nadeem), who not only gives him a new face but a new name as well, Babar (Humayun Saeed). But Zoheb's new identity also has a past and it is only when Sherry (Nausheen Ali Sardar) enters the picture that he finds out about it. Sherry wants revenge over wrongs Babar had committed against her, and attempts to kill Zoheb, not realizing that the man with Babar's face is actually Zoheb. She plants a car bomb in Zoheb's car, and in a surprise twist Sheeza in a motorcycle comes to warn Zoheb. After jumping over a tractor trailer in the car (Sheeza uses very good driving skills to guide the motorcycle under the trailer), Zoheb knocks his car into another, causing it to flip and explode. The car he was in then also explodes, but not before Sheeza is able to alert him and save his life. Zoheb flirts with death on many additional occasions but ultimately is able to convince Sherry that he is in fact not Babar. After some more unexpected twists, Sherry falls in love with Babar and plans to help him avenge himself from the likes of Mr. Khan and Sheeza. First Zoheb kills Mr. Khan's henchman, in a surprising swimming pool scene in which the henchman is chased down and strangled by a snake that causes him to leap out of the pool in pain. Later, Zoheb plants a bomb in Mr. Khan's car, leading to Khan's demise. And finally, he exacts revenge on Sheeza, whose saving his life was not enough to save her own. Zoheb and Sherry are seen at the end reuniting with his family.

== Cast ==
- Ahmed Butt as Zoheb
- Nadeem as Dr. Azeem
- Nausheen Ali Sardar as Sherry
- Humayun Saeed as Zoheb/Babar
- Javed Sheikh as Mr. Khan Tariq
- Pooja Kanwal as Sheeza
- Saba Hameed as Mrs. Haroon
- Prithvi as Mr. Haroon
- Rana Jung Bahadur as Taji

== Film location ==
The film was shot in Northern India.

== Music ==
The songs are sung by Asha Bhosle, Sunidhi Chauhan, Alka Yagnik, and Jawad Ahmad. Music is also by Jawad Ahmad.

1. Mein Ek Din Laut Kay Aaoonga
2. Cherey Badal Jatey Hain
3. Dil Ke Tar Bajay
4. Dum Dum Laga Ray
5. Suno Piya
6. Suno Piya (Remix)
