= Angarey (1972 film) =

Pakistani film

- انگارے
- Directed by: Fareed Ahmed
- Starring: Shamim Ara; Nadeem; Nisho; Masud Akhtar; Talish
- Music by: A. Hameed
- Release date: 15 September 1972
- Country: Pakistan
- Language: Urdu

Angarey is a Pakistani film directed by Fareed Ahmed. It stars Shamim Ara, Nadeem, Nisho, Masud Akhtar and Agha Talish in lead roles. It was released on 15 September 1972. The music composition was provided by A. Hameed.

== Plot ==
The plot revolves around the family of Noor Muhammad Chaudhary whose elder son Akhtar Chaudhary returns from abroad after getting an L.L.B degree. While his younger son Anwar wanders around all the day and flies the kites. He loves and wants to marry Aliya, the younger sister of the station master of his village. On the other hand, Chaudhary looks for an educated girl to marry Akhtar, who could help him in abroad, for which he chooses Aliya. But, Chaudhary's cousin brother Gulzar Ahmed (who wants to grab his property), changes the bride by sending the proposal of Aliya's elder sister, Ayesha. At the time of nikkah ceremony, it reveals on Chaudhary that the bride has been changed. He is infuriated and decides to call off the marriage. But Akhtar denies as he doesn't want to hurt someone and marries her. After her marriage, she wins Chaudhary's heart by treating him well.

One day, when Chudhary realises that she is uneducated, he advises Akhtar to go abroad lonely because there his uneducated wife will be a burden for him. He goes abroad living Ayesha behind with his newborn. After few days, the cousin brother of Chaudhary devises another plan to remove the heirs of the property. At a night, Chaudhary sees Ayesha leaving from Anwar's room. Gulzar and his wife reach there and blames her of bad deeds and throws her out of the house. Anwar tries to help her but all in vain. Aliya's brother also refuses flatly to marry him with her sister. The heartbroken Anwar then goes to his father in drunken state and tells him everything clearly to which he apologizes and repents on his deed. Gulzar comes to take his signature on legal papers of abandonment but Ayesha comes there and takes over it. Now, Chaudhary discovers his schemes and insults him. He runs outside the room, locks them inside and sets the house on fire. Akhtar from abroad reaches there and along with Anwar saves the house. Police arrests the Gulzar Ahmed and his wife dies in the fire. The family then reunites there and Chaudhary announces the marriage of Aliya and Anwar.

== Cast ==
- Shamim Ara as Ayesha
- Nadeem as Anwar Chaudhary
- Nisho as Aliya
- Masud Akhtar as Akhtar Chaudhary
- Talish as Noor Muhammad Chaudhary
- Diljeet Mirza
- Saqi

== Soundtrack ==
All lyrics are written by Kaleem Usmani; all music is composed by A. Hameed.

Angarey
No.	Title	Lyrics	Singer (s)	Length
1.	"Eid Ka Din Hai, Gallay Hans Ke Laga Lo"		Ahmed Rushdi, Mala
2.	"Chanda Meray Tu"		Mala
3.	"Ab Ke Hum Bichray To Shayad Kabhi Khwabon Mein Milen"	Ahmed Faraz	Mehdi Hassan
4.	"Ik Pal To Ruko, Hum Se Waada Karo"		Irene Perveen, Ahmed Rushdi

== Reception ==
Hailing the film as "an unusual film", The Statesman praised the film, applauding its story, performances, and "restrained directorial handling" by Farid Ahmed, which elevates it to "something offbeat".

In an interview with the Daily Times, screenwriter Fasih Bari Khan cited the film as one of his favourites.
