= S.S. Mausoof =

Pakistani-American writer and filmmaker

S.S. Mausoof is a Pakistani-American writer and filmmaker who lives in San Francisco.

Mausoof's feature narrative, Kala Pul, The Black Bridge (2006), is a noir thriller shot in Karachi by Markus Huersch and was short listed at the Singapore Media Development Authority's Asian Festival of First Films. The film also won the best in category award at NJ Cinefest. His other works include the critically acclaimed short film, Absolution (2010) and a unique documentary on the Indus valley civilization, In Search of Meluhha: The Story Of Mohenjodaro. Maysoof's debut novel, The Warehouse, has been published by Hachette in India and is scheduled to be published in the UK, France and Spain.
