= Mohabbat (1972 film) =

1972 film

- محبت
- Directed by: S. Suleman
- Screenplay by: Ali Sufiyan Afaqi
- Story by: Hameeda Jabeen
- Based on: Tamanna (novel)
- Produced by: Azra Jabeen
- Starring: Zeba; Muhammad Ali; Sabiha Khanam; Santosh Kumar; Andaleeb; Begum Khurshid Mirza; Rangeela; Saiqa; Zeba Shehnaz; Saqi; Qavi; Niggo; Ghayyur Akhtar
- Cinematography: Ali Jan
- Music by: Nisar Bazmi
- Production company: Azra Movies
- Release date: 2 June 1972
- Country: Pakistan
- Language: Urdu

Mohabbat is a 1972 Pakistani Urdu romantic drama film directed by S. Suleman.

The lead cast included Zeba, Muhammad Ali, Sabiha Khanam, Santosh, Andaleeb, and Begum Khurshid Mirza. The film was based on the novel Tamanna by Hameeda Jabeen.

== Cast ==
- Zeba
- Muhammad Ali
- Sabiha Khanam
- Santosh
- Andaleeb
- Begum Khurshid Mirza
- Rangeela
- Saiqa
- Zeba Shehnaz
- Roshan
- Saqi
- Qavi
- Sahira
- Niggo
- Chham Chham
- Parvez Sajjad
- Ghayyur Akhtar

== Music and soundtracks ==
The music of the film was composed by Nisar Bazmi. The lyricists were Qateel Shafai, Habib Jalib, and Ahmad Faraz:

- Agar Koi Poochhay, Baharon Ka Matlab... Singer(s): Ahmad Rushdi, Runa Laila, Poet: Qateel Shafai
- Banwra Mann, Aisay Dharka Na Tha... Singer(s): Noor Jehan, Poet: ?
- Di Mubarakbad Us Nay, Shukriya Is Dillagi Ka... Singer(s): Runa Laila, Poet: ?
- Khudara, Mohabbat, Mohabbat Na Karna... Singer(s): Ahmad Rushdi, Poet: ?
- Kisi Ki Ankhon Nay Kiya Hay Aisa Jadoo... Singer(s): Noor Jahan, Poet: ?
- Ranjish Hi Sahi, Dil Hi Dukhanay Kay Liye Aa... Singer(s): Mehdi Hassan, Poet: Ahmad Faraz
- Yeh Mehfil Jo Aaj Sajji Hay, Is Mehfil Mein, Hay Koi Ham Sa... Singer(s): Tahira Syed, Poet: ?

== Release and box office ==
Mohabbat was released on 2 June 1972. The film was an 'average hit' at the box office.

== Awards ==
Year	Award	Category	Awardee	Ref.
1972	Nigar Award	Best actress	Zeba	
1972	Nigar Award	Best playback singer	Tahira Syed	
