= Ghunghat (1996 film) =

1996 film

- Directed by: Syed Noor
- Produced by: Shahzad Rafique
- Starring: Shaan; Resham; Saira Khan; Saima Noor; Arbaaz Khan; Andaleeb
- Music by: Amjad Bobby
- Release date: 12 July 1996
- Running time: Awards: Won 4 Nigar Awards in 1996
- Country: Pakistan
- Language: Urdu

Ghunghat (also spelled Ghoonghat) (Urdu: گھونگٹ) is an Urdu language Pakistani film released in the summer of 1996. It marked Shaan's comeback into the Pakistani film industry and won the actor many plaudits for his performance as the scheming villain. It also marked the debut of Arbaaz Khan, son of actor Asif Khan.

It is directed by Syed Noor and produced by Shahzad Rafique. Pakistani singer Fariha Pervez dubbed Andaleeb's character in the film on the request of the director Syed Noor.

== Plot ==
The story of Ghunghat revolves around Afreen (played by Andaleeb) who marries Kamal (played by Mohsin Khan) after a misunderstanding, before they fall in love. However, her life becomes complicated when her ex-lover, Omer (played by Shaan), re-enters the picture. He plots to blackmail her and sends another woman to seduce Kamal in an attempt to destroy her in an attempt to destroy her. The film explores themes of love, betrayal, and the complexities of relationships as Afreen is torn between her past and present. As the narrative unfolds, Omer's return leads to tension and conflict in Afreen's marriage, culminating in dramatic confrontations that test the characters' loyalties and moral boundaries. The film also touches on societal expectations and the challenges faced by women in maintaining their honor and dignity.

== Cast ==
- Mohsin Khan as Kamal
- Andaleeb as Afrheen
- Shaan as Naddam
- Resham
- Arbaaz Khan

== Film's soundtrack ==
Ghunghat's music soundtrack is composed by Amjad Bobby. A number of the film's songs became hits, some before the film was even released.

Song	Singers	Song lyrics by	Music by
"Dekha Jo Chehra Tera Mausam Bhi Pyaara Laga"	Arshad Mehmood	Riaz ur Rehman Saghar	Amjad Bobby
"Mein Larki Hoon Phool Tau Nahin Ke Koi Mujhe Taur Le Ga"	Saira Nasim and Waris Baig	Riaz ur Rehman Saghar	Amjad Bobby
"Yeh Mausam Yeh Tanhai"	Shabana Kausar	Riaz ur Rehman Saghar	Amjad Bobby
"Kaisay Jiyae Mere Bin"	Saira Nasim and Waris Baig	Riaz ur Rehman Saghar	Amjad Bobby

== Awards ==
- Nigar Award for Best Supporting Actress in 1996
- Nigar Award for Best Music Director in 1996
- Nigar Award for Best Song Writer in 1996
- Nigar Award for Best Male Singer in 1996
