= Suhag =

1972 film

- Directed by: Fareed Ahmed
- Screenplay by: Masroor Anwar
- Story by: Hameeda Jabeen
- Produced by: Shamim Ara
- Starring: Shamim Ara; Zia Mohyeddin; Nadeem; Andaleeb; Sabira Sultana; Asif Khan; Naeema Garaj; Talish; Qavi; Zamurrad
- Music by: Nashad
- Production company: Shamim Ara Productions
- Release date: 8 November 1972
- Country: Pakistan
- Language: Urdu

Suhag is a 1972 Pakistani film directed by Fareed Ahmed and produced by Shamim Ara under the banner Shamim Ara Productions.

Shamim Ara also played the lead role in this film opposite Nadeem and Zia Mohyeddin. The film was based on Hameeda Jabeen novel Saemi. Music was composed by Nashad. Nadeem played a villainous role in the film. The film was commercially unsuccessful.

== Plot ==
Saemi lives alone with her mother after her father marries a young woman, Naghma. Her elder sister, Saila, is married to Professor Waqar, and the couple has two young daughters. Saemi meets Murad, the tutor of Saila’s children, and they gradually fall in love. After getting to know each other better, they decide to marry. Saemi shares her decision with her friends and Saila. However, Murad has to travel abroad because of his father’s illness. He continues to write letters to Saemi, promising to return as soon as possible.

Meanwhile, Saemi’s life takes a dramatic turn when Saila dies. Soon after, her father also dies, leaving Saemi and her mother in a difficult situation. To ensure the proper carre and love for Saila’s children, Saemi’s mother pressures her into marrying Waqar and taking responsibility for her sister’s daughters.

When Murad returns, he is heartbroken to learn that Saemi has married Waqar. Believing that she has betrayed him, he struggles to accept the situation. However, Saemi’s friend Sultana explains the circumstances that forced Saemi to make this difficult decision following the deaths of her sister and father.

Waqar later invites Murad to dinner at his home, where Murad asks Saemi to meet him the following day at her friend’s house. Saemi goes there and tries to convince Murad that they should not meet again. However, Murad reminds her of their past love and the promises they made to each other. As a result, they gradually resume their relationship and begin meeting regularly. Eventually, they decide to elope together. Their frequent meetings arouse Waqar’s suspicions, and he eventually discovers the truth about their relationship.

Meanwhile, Saemi’s mother is expected to return from Hajj, arriving in Karachi by train. Waqar asks the family to get ready to receive her at the railway station. On the way there, Saemi gets out of the car at her friend’s house, saying that she has an important task to complete and will join them at the station later. From her friend’s house, Saemi returns home to pack her belongings. There, she finds a letter from Waqar. In the letter, he tells her to live her life according to her own wishes, as he now understands her love for Murad. He also explains that he is stepping out of her life so that she can live peacefully with the man she loves. After reading the letter, Saemi realises the true value of her home and family. She then leaves for the railway station with Murad. As the train begins to move, Murad helps her get off in time, where Waqar tries to understand his daughters that she will not come to them. In the end, Saemi succeeds in boarding the train when Waqar notices her, lending her arm out of the train door for her support. Murad waves hand to the couple as they reunite.

== Cast ==
- Shamim Ara as Saiam "Saemi"
- Zia Mohyeddin as Professor Waqar
- Nadeem as Murad
- Andaleeb as Razia
- Sabira Sultana as Saila
- Asif Khan
- Naeema Garaj
- Pandit Shahed

=== Guest appearances ===
- Talish as Ahmed
- Zamurrad as Naghma "Niggi"
- Qavi

== Music and soundtrack ==
All lyrics are written by Masroor Anwar; all music is composed by Nashad

Suhag
No.	Title	Singer (s)	Length
1.	"Kis Ne Meray Labon Par Bakheray"	Ahmed Rushdi, Noor Jehan
2.	"Pyar Ko Hum Banaye Ge Aisi Misal"	Ahmed Rushdi, Noor Jehan
3.	"Mujh Ko Gham-e-Haalat Ki Tasvir Samjhana"	Noor Jehan
4.	"Kuch Hi Dino Ki Baat Hai"	Ahmed Rushdi
5.	"Tumhen Mubarak Nayi Kahani"	Mehdi Hassan

== Production ==
The film was based on Hameeda Jabeen's bestselling of 1960s Saemi (romanized: Ṣāi'mi). It was directed by Fareed Ahmed and produced Shamim Ara under her production banner Shamim Ara Productions. It was Zia Mohyeddin's second film in Pakistan after Mujrim Kon.
