= Javed Raza =

Film director

- Occupations: Film director film producer, writer
- Years active: 1970 – Present

Javed Raza is a film director and producer in Pakistan.

== Directing career ==
Before he started directing, he was a film assistant director and the assistant of actor Saeed Khan Rangeela.

He directed his first film in 1982, Visa Dubai Daa. After Visa Dubai Daa, he directed films including Akbara, Mutthi Mai Rumaal, Dakoo Haseena, Piyasa Saavan, Kurri Munda Raazi and Amanat. In 2008, he released his film, Kabhi Pyar Na Karna.

== Filmography ==
=== Director ===
| Year | Film | Language |
|---|---|---|
| 1981 | Amanat | Urdu |
| 1982 | Visa Dubai Da | Punjabi |
| 1984 | Akbara | Urdu |
| 1987 | Mutthi Mai Rumaal | Punjabi |
| 1990 | Daku Hasina | Urdu |
| 1994 | Piyasa Sawan | Urdu |
| 1997 | Kuri Munda Razi | Punjabi |
| 2008 | Kabhi Pyar Na Karna | Urdu |
| 2012 | Money Money Paisa Paisa | Urdu |
| 2013 | Shor Sharaba | Punjabi |
| 2013 | Dil Hai Pakistani | Urdu |
