= Family Pride (TV series) =

- Starring: Paul Henry; Zia Mohyeddin; Talat Hussain
- Country of origin: United Kingdom
- Original language: English
- No. of episodes: 51

Production
- Executive producer: Zia Mohyeddin
- Running time: 30 minutes
- Production company: Central Independent Television

Original release
- Network: Central Television; Channel 4
- Release: 30 June 1991 – 16 December 1992

Family Pride is a British soap opera produced by Central Television, which ran from 30 June 1991 to 16 December 1992. It was written by Mahmood Jamal and Barry Simmer and centred on the lives of three Asian families living in Birmingham: the Bedis, the Rizvis and the Lais. It was produced by Zia Mohyeddin, directed by Henry Foster and Faris Kermani, and first appeared on 30 June 1991.

== Background ==
Family Pride was shown in the Midlands region on ITV, with national broadcast on Channel 4. It was considered to be the first Asian soap opera in Britain, which India Today praised and wrote: "Asian actors finally have a chance to get their teeth into some meaty roles instead of the crumbs they've been offered so far: stereotyped bit roles". Zia Mohyeddin, as well as starring in the soap, acted as the executive producer. He began devising it in 1989 when he realised that the necessary acting and writing talent was available. Despite only running for 51 episodes, it was praised for being a showcase for Asian talent in the UK.
