= Raza Mir =

Pakistani director

- Born: 4 November 1927; Lahore, Punjab, British India
- Died: 15 September 2002 (aged 74); Calgary, Canada
- Occupations: Cinematographer; director; actor; producer
- Years active: 1943 – 2002
- Spouse(s): Musarrat Mir, Meena Shorey (m. 1946; div. 1947)
- Children: Asif Raza Mir , Ahsan Raza Mir (sons) (Daughter) Amera Raza Mir
- Relatives: Ahad Raza Mir (grandson) Adnan Raza Mir (grandson) Mehreen Mir (granddaughter) Khushbakht Mir (granddaughter) Mohsin Butt (grandson) Qasim Butt (grandson)
- Awards: Pride of Performance by the President of Pakistan (1999)

Raza Mir (1927 – 15 September 2002) was a Pakistani cinematographer, film producer and director.

He was the cinematographer of the Pakistan's first ever film Teri Yaad (1948). He is best known for Lakhon Mein Aik (1967), which was based on Hindu-Muslim relations. His work as a cinematographer earned him three Nigar Awards. He was also awarded with the President's Pride of Performance.

== Early life ==
Mir was born in 1927 at Lahore, Punjab, British India.

== Career ==
Mir first joined The Pancholi Studio as a cameraman in 1943. Shehar Se Door (1946) is his only film as an actor, where he played the lead role opposite Meena Shorey. He was the cinematographer of Pakistan's first ever film Teri Yaad (1949) in which Asha Posley and Nasir Khan were the leads. He had a difficult time while filming with the poor technology and cameras due to which the film received average reviews. His work as a director in Lakhon Mein Aik (1967) was met with mostly positive critical reception.

== Personal life ==
Mir first married the actress Meena Shorey, however they divorced later, before the independence of Pakistan. His son from his second marriage, Asif Raza Mir is a famous television and film actor. Acclaimed actor Ahad Raza Mir is his grandson.

== Death ==
Mir died on 15 September 2002, in Calgary, Canada, which became his final resting place.

== Filmography ==
=== as an actor ===
Year	Film	Language	Ref.
1946	Shehar Se Door	Urdu	

=== as a cinematographer ===
Year	Film	Language	Ref.
1948	Teri Yaad	Urdu	
1949	Pheray	Punjabi	
1950	Laray	Punjabi	
1958	Aakhri Nishan	Urdu	
1959	Neend	Urdu	
1960	Rahguzar	Urdu	
1963	Seema	Urdu	
1966	Aag Ka Darya	Urdu	
1967	Zinda Laash	Urdu	

=== as a director ===
Year	Film	Language	Ref.
1964	Beti	Urdu	
1967	Lakhon Mein Aik	Urdu	
1969	Aasra	Urdu	
1969	Aneela	Urdu	
1971	Parai Aag	Urdu	
1972	Naag Muni	Urdu	
1973	Wichhria Sathi	Punjabi	
1975	Arzoo	Urdu	
1975	Professor	Urdu	
1976	Sohni Mehinwal	Punjabi	
1978	Dil Kay Daagh	Urdu	
1981	Posti	Punjabi	
1993	Anhoni	Urdu	

== Awards and recognition ==
Year	Award	Category	Work	Result	Ref(s).
1958	Nigar Awards	Best Cinematographer	Aakhri Nishan	Won	
1963	Nigar Awards	Best Cinematographer	Seema	Won	
1966	Nigar Awards	Best Cinematographer	Aag Ka Darya	Won	
1999	Pride of Performance Award	Arts	Contribution to Pakistani cinema	Won	
