= Zara Sheikh =

Pakistani model and actress

- زارا شیخ
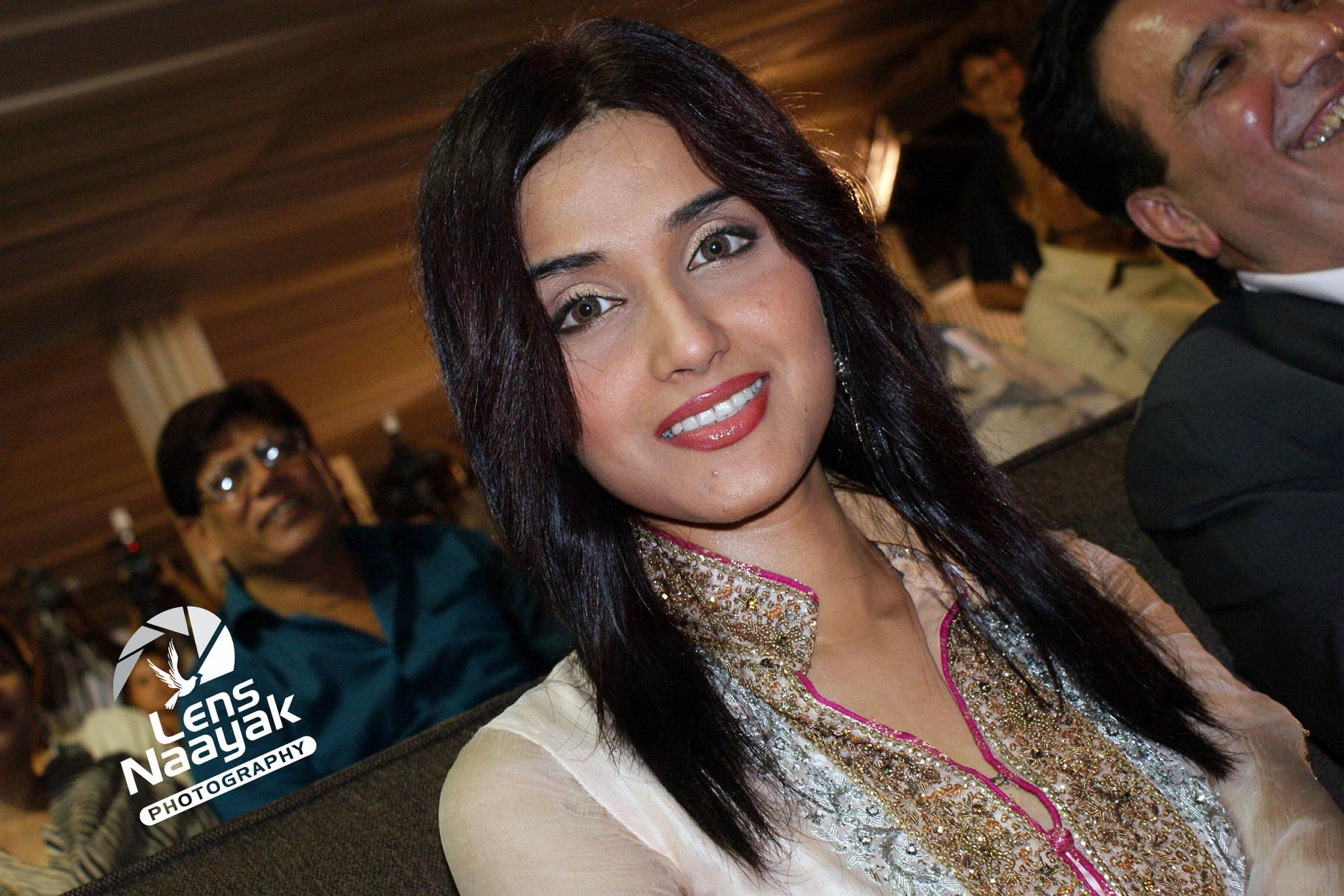
- Sheikh in 2010
- Born: Lahore, Punjab, Pakistan
- Occupations: Model; actress
- Years active: 2000 – present

Zara Sheikh (Punjabi, Urdu: زارا شیخ) is a Pakistani model and actress. Sheikh has acted in films such as Tere Pyar Mein (2000), Salakhain (2004), and Laaj (2003). She won the Nigar Award for Best Actress for her performance in Tere Pyar Mein and the Lux Style Award for Best Actress for her performance in 'Laaj'.

== Career ==
=== Modelling ===
Zara Sheikh started her more than decade long modeling career even before stepping into movies at a very young age. She started out with photographer Khawar Riaz and till date, is named as one of his most successful models. Due to her unconventional looks, slender frame, and height, Zara was a favourite for leading designers. She could be seen on the covers of many Pakistani magazines, and appeared in campaigns for brands like Deepak Perwani, Aasia Saail, Salina Wardah, Nee Punhal, Dawn Bread, Mobilink, Rite Biscuits, Golden Chips, Coca-Cola, Head & Shoulders, Dabur Amla, 7Up, Meezan, Gul Ahmed, Nishat, Levi's, Crossroads, and Lajwanti.

Unlike most Pakistani models, her fashion career, despite entering movies in 2000, continued for a long time.

=== Films ===
Zara Sheikh made her cinema screen debut in 2000, through film director Hassan Askari's Tere Pyar Mein, in which she played the role of an Indian Sikh girl, who falls in love with a Pakistani banker. Sheikh received the Nigar's Best Actress award for her role in the film.

In 2002, she appeared in Sajjad Gul's Chalo Ishq Larain. A year later, in 2003, Sheikh played the part of a Hindu girl, Ram Khori, who converts to Islam, in Laaj (means Honour in English), a love tale set in the backdrop of 1947 partition of India and Pakistan.

In 2004, Zara Sheikh worked in the 150 minute, Shahzad Rafique-directed Salakhain (translated as The Bars).

In 2006, Zara Sheikh played the role of a girl-in-love in the Mubashir Lucman-directed Pehla Pehla Pyar (The First Love), a film partly filmed in Thailand. Speaking of her experience, post-production, Sheikh said, "It's not easy to work with Mubasher. He's motivated by his film a lot and does not believe in any compromises." She also stated that, at one point she had worked twenty-eight hours at a stretch, but that when I saw the result on the screen afterwards, I was in tears because it was clearly worth it."

In 2019, she starred in Heer Maan Ja.

=== Singing ===
In 2002, Zara Sheikh collaborated with Ali Haider to playback sing three musical numbers for her movie Chalo Ishq Larain.

== Filmography ==
=== Film ===
Year	Title	Role	Ref.
2000	Tere Pyar Mein	Preeti	
2002	Chalo Ishq Larain		
2003	Laaj		
2003	Commando		
2003	Yeh Waada Raha		
2004	Salakhain		
2005	Tere Bin Jiya Na Jaye		
2006	Pehla Pehla Pyaar		
2008	Kabhi Pyar Na Karna		
2014	Honour Killing	Sameera	
2017	Jung		
2019	Heer Maan Ja		

=== Television ===
Year	Title	Role	Network
2021	Raqs-e-Bismil	Laila	Hum TV

== Accolades ==
Ceremony	Category	Film	Result	Ref.
2000 Nigar Awards	Best Actress (Urdu)	Tere Pyar Mein	Won	
1st Lux Style Awards	Best Film Actress	Tere Pyar Mein	Won	
2nd Lux Style Awards	Best Film Actress	Chalo Ishq Larain	Nominated	
3rd Lux Style Awards	Best Film Actress	Laaj	Won	

== Music videos ==
- "Gal V Na Kare" – Wet Metals
- "O' Sanam" (O' Love!) –Yasir Akhter
- "Ghar Aya Mera" (Mine, Came Home) – Tulsi
- "Khamaj" – Fuzon
- "Punjabi Touch" – Abrar-ul-Haq
- Hum Ek Hain (We Are One) – Shehzad Roy
- "Atom Bomb (Jee Chaey)" – Faakhir
- "Tu Hi Meri Aas" – Usman Malik

== See also ==
- List of Pakistani actresses
