= Riaz ur Rehman Saghar =

Poet and film songs lyricist

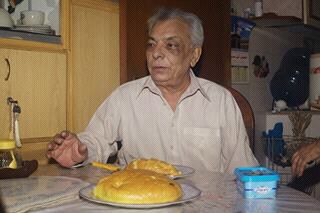
- Born: 1 Dec 1941; Bathinda, Punjab, British India
- Died: 1 June 2013 (aged 71); Lahore, Punjab, Pakistan
- Occupations: Poet, film song lyricist
- Years active: 1973–2013
- Family: wife and one daughter
- Awards: Nigar Award as Best Film Song Lyricist in 1995

Riaz-Ur-Rehman Saghar (Punjabi, Urdu: ریاض الرحمان ساغر, born 1 December 1941, Bathinda, Punjab, British India; died 1 June 2013, at Lahore, Pakistan) was a poet and film song lyricist active in Pakistani cinema.

He had been awarded numerous awards in recognition of his services to the Pakistani film industry. He is credited with having written over 25,000 songs in his lifetime, including many for noted Pakistani singers such as Hadiqa Kiani ("Dupatta Mera Malmal Da" [دوپٹا میرا ململ دا], "Yaad Sajan Di Ayi" [یاد سجن دی آوے]) and a duet song with Asha Bhosle and Adnan Sami Khan ("Kabhi to Nazar Milao" [کبھی تو نظر ملاؤ]). Saghar also wrote prose and dialogue for some of the films.

== Early life ==
Riaz-ur-Rehman Saghar was born on 1 December 1941 in Bathinda, Punjab, British India to Maulvi Muhammad Azeem and Sadiqan Bibi. In 1947, his family emigrated to Pakistan as refugees following the partition of India. During the journey, Saghar's father was murdered by a Sikh extremist, and his infant brother died of starvation. In Walton Cantonment and later Multan, where Saghar and his mother settled, they made their living making and selling paper bags in the marketplace. Saghar enrolled in Millat High School where he discovered his love of poetry. He later entered Emerson College Multan for Intermediate Studies, where his poetry readings attracted large crowds. After several warnings, he was expelled from Emerson, after which he traveled to Lahore to begin his career. He finished his schooling in Multan and then moved to Lahore in 1957.

== Career ==
=== In journalism ===
In Lahore, Saghar found a job at Lail o Nahar, an Urdu-language weekly magazine, where he worked for a year but soon realized it was not his place of interest. He moved on to Nawa-i-Waqt daily newspaper and while there, he did his Intermediate and bachelor's degrees in 'Punjabi Fazil'. He worked as a culture and film editor at Nawa-i-Waqt (newspaper) and the weekly 'Family' magazine till 1996.

=== As a newspaper columnist ===
Saghar was the first columnist to write on national political situations in the form of a ballad. His first column was published in 1996 by the title of "Arz Kia Hai" (Urdu عرض کیا ہے), covering political, social and cultural Issues. His last column was published in Nawa-i-Waqt on 24 March 2013 by the title of "Subah ka sitara chup gya ha" (صبح کا ستارہ چُھپ گیا ہے) .

=== Career in the film industry ===
==== As a songwriter ====
While working as a journalist, Saghar's love for poetry remained strong. In 1958, he wrote his first song for a film that was never released. His first released song was in the film Alia, but his first real success came with the song "Mere dil kay sanam khane mei ek tasveer aisi hai" from the film Shareek e Hayat. He wrote film song lyrics for a Punjabi movie "Ishq Khuuda"(2013) which was released after his death. Saghar worked as a journalist but his passion for poetry drove him to the film world as well. He wrote more than 2000 songs during his professional career.

==== Film dialogue and script writer ====
Saghar worked as a dialogue and story writer for about 75 films, including Shama (1974), Naukar (1975), Susraal (1977), Shabana (1976), Nazrana (1978), Aurat aik paheli, Awaz (1978), Bharosa(1977) Tarana and Moor (film) (2015)

=== As a film and TV songwriter ===
Saghar has written over 2,000 songs for many singers and music directors for Pakistani films, radio and TV.

Some of his popular songs were:

- Chalo Kahin Dur Yeh Samaj Chorr Dein Sung by Mala and Mehdi Hassan, music by A. Hameed, film Samaj (1974)
- Ankhein Ghazal Hain Aapki Aur Hount Hain Gulab Sung by Asad Amanat Ali Khan, music by M. Ashraf, film Saheli (1978)
- Dekha Jo Chehra Tera Mausam Bhi Pyara Laga Sung by Arshad Mehmood (singer), music by Amjad Bobby, film Ghunghat (1996 film)
- Mujh Ko Bhi Koi Lift Karadey Sung by Adnan Sami Khan
- Dupatta Mera Malmal Da Sung by Hadiqa Kiani, lyrics by Riaz ur Rehman Saghar (1998)
- Kal Shab Dekha Mein Nay Chaand Jharoke Mein Sung by Waris Baig, music by Sajjad Ali and Raunaq Ali, film Mujhe Chand Chahiye (2000)
- O' Vela Yaad Kar Sung by Fariha Pervez, music by M. Arshad (2001)
- Yaad Sajan Di Aaii Sung by Hadiqa Kiani, lyrics by Riaz ur Rehman Saghar (2002)

=== Publications ===
Song books

- Main Nay Jo Geet Likhay

Prose

- Woh Bhi Kia Din Thay (autobiography)
- Camera, Qalam aur Dunya (Travelogue of 7 Countries)
- Lahore Ta Bombay Brasta Delhi (Travelogue of India)
- Sarkari Mehmaan Khaana (Book on events inside Jail)

Poetry

- Chand Jharoke Mein
- Piare Piare Geet Hamare
- Arz Kia Hai, Sur Sitarey
- Aangan Aangan Taray ( Poems in this book were presented on PTV for children. All poems started from Urdu alphabets. Federal Ministry of Education also instructed all syllabus book boards to utilize this book).
- Chalo Cheen Chalain (travelogue to China: the first ballad travelogue in Urdu)
- Sooraj Kab Nikle Ga (incomplete autobiography in ballad form)
- Pakistan pe jaan qurban ( a national song recited by him on Pakistan Television)

== Awards and recognition ==
Saghar has received many awards in recognition of his services to the film industry of Pakistan. Prominent ones are:

- National Film Award
- PTV Award
- Cultural Graduate Award
- Nigar Award in 1995 for Best Film Song Lyricist in the film Sargam (1995 film)
- Bolan Award

== Death and legacy ==
After being ill for a few months, Riaz ur Rehman Saghar lost his battle to cancer in Jinnah Hospital, Lahore on 1 June 2013 and was laid to rest in Kareem Block, Iqbal Town, Lahore graveyard on 2 June 2013. "He could write a poem in 10 to 15 minutes no matter how noisy it was." said a Pakistani journalist Sajid Yazdani who had associated with him for 10 to 15 years. Among his survivors were a wife and a daughter.

Veteran Pakistani musician Arshad Mehmood (composer) said at his death that he was one of the poets who understood music as much as he understood poetry.

== Books ==
- Saghar, Riaz-ur-Rehman Woh bhi kia din thay (Autobiography)
