= Humaira Arshad =

Pakistani pop singer from Lahore

Humera Arshad حمیرا ارشد
- Occupation: Singer
- Years active: 2000–present
- Spouse: Ahmed Butt (m. 2004–2019)
- Musical career
- Also known as: Humera
- Origin: Lahore, Punjab, Pakistan
- Genres: Pop
- Years active: 2000–present
- Label: None

Humaira Arshad or Humera Arshad (Punjabi, Urdu: حمیرا ارشد; born 1975) is a Pakistani pop singer from Lahore.

== Career ==
She started her career as an actress in PTV Home's television series Ainak Wala Jin (a PTV show for children in the 1990s) where she played the role of Toofani Nagan.

She is a folk, pop, culture, and ghazal singer who has been classically trained. Her albums are Choori Kach Di and Gal Sun Dholna. Humaira says she used to accompany her mother to majlis for soaz khwani from an early age. She also musically trained under Nusrat Fateh Ali Khan for some time.

== Discography ==
=== Albums ===
- Choori Kach Di
  1. "Ankheen Meri"
  2. "Chori Kach Di"
  3. "Dil Se"
  4. "Give Me Chance"
  5. "Hasda Hasanda"
  6. "Jag Soo Gaya"
  7. "Listen To Me"
  8. "O Piya"
  9. "Saanwre"
  10. "Sada Hoon Apne Pyar Ki"
  11. "Sham Ki Ankh"
  12. "Uuf Allah"
- Gal Sun Dholna
  1. "Aa ke Sapnoon Mein"
  2. "Aai Re Raat Mehndi Ki"
  3. "Aaja Paich Laraiye"
  4. "Aashiqui Aashiqui"
  5. "Akhan Tikhiyan"
  6. "Ankhiyan De Vich"
  7. "Dilbar Dil Ke"
  8. "Gul Sun Dholna"
  9. "Habibi Hayya Hayya"
  10. "Main Nai Boldi"
  11. "Mur Aawo Re Sayyan"
  12. "Na Koe Jan Na Pehchan"

=== Singles ===
- "Aaja Paich Laraiye"
- "Aashiqui Aashiqui"
- "Akhan Tikhiyan"
- "Dilbar Dil Ke"
- "Gal Sun Dholna"
- "Main Nai Boldi"
- "Mur Aawo Re Sayyan"
- Naats, Hamd and a Ramadan Salaam

=== Coke Studio ===
- (2017) "Kaatay Na Katay" alongside Aima Baig & Rachel Viccaji
- (2018) "Luddi Hai Jamalo" With Ali Sethi (Episode 11)

== Personal life ==
Arshad married film actor Ahmed Butt in 2004. They divorced in 2019.

== Television shows ==
Television series	Role	TV Channel
Ainak Wala Jin (1993 TV Show for kids)	Toofani Nagan	PTV One

== Awards and recognition ==
- 'Pakistan Achievement Award' in 2015. She was given this award at a ceremony in London by an organization called 'Pakistan Achievement Awards UK and Europe'.
