= Tahira Syed =

Pakistani singer

Tahira Syed طاہرہ سيد PP
- Born: Tahira Syed; 6 November 1955 (age 70); Lahore, Punjab, Pakistan
- Genre: Folk music • Ghazal
- Occupations: Vocalist; TV personality
- Instrument: Vocals
- Years active: 1968 – present
- Label: Radio Pakistan
- Spouse: Naeem Bokhari (m. 1977; div. 1990)
- Children: Hasnain Bokhari (son); Kiran Bokhari (daughter)
- Parent(s): Malika Pukhraj (mother); Shabbir Hussain (father)
- Relatives: Asif Habibullah (son-in-law)

Tahira Syed (in Punjabi and Urdu: طاہرہ سيد) (born 1955,Lahore) is a Pakistani ghazal and folk singer. Her repertoire includes folk songs in Urdu, Punjabi, Dogri and Pahari.

== Early life ==
Tahira Syed was born in Lahore to a vocalist Malika Pukhraj and Shabbir Hussain, a Punjabi, government official and writer.

Syed obtained her primary education from the Convent of Jesus and Mary where she passed her Senior Cambridge examinations. She graduated from Lahore College, then studied law at the Punjab University. After obtaining an LLB degree, she enrolled in a Masters Program in English at Kinnaird College for Women, Lahore, but later dropped out of the college.

Syed began singing, aged 12, to please her mother. After two years of rigorous classical music training by Akhtar Hussain, Syed was instructed in geet and ghazal by her mother. Her final teacher, Nazar Hussain, taught her voice modulation and raggi (singing using the throat).

== Music career ==
Syed first appeared on air in 1968–1969 on Radio Pakistan, and then on Pakistan Television. "Yeh Alam Shauq Ka Dekha na Jaey", "Chanjar Phabdi Na Mutiar Bina" and "Abhi Tau Main Jawan Houn", written by Pakistani poet Hafeez Jalandhri, are some of her most popular songs. In April 1985, she appeared on the cover of National Geographic magazine. She received the Pakistan Television Lifetime Achievement Award, and the Pride of Performance Award from the President of Pakistan on 23 March 2013. In 1972, she won the Nigar Award for Best Female Playback Singer.

Syed continues to perform at diverse events such as a "ghazal evening" in Dallas, Texas, U.S., a tribute to Faiz Ahmed Faiz in Philadelphia, Pennsylvania, U.S., and at the Faiz International Festival in Lahore.

== Personal life ==
Syed was married to lawyer Naeem Bukhari for 15 years (1975–1990) before their separation and divorce; they have two children together. She is a well-known personality in Pakistan and occasionally speaks publicly at art and literature events.

== Awards and recognition ==
Year	Award	Category	Result	Title	Ref.
1972	Nigar Awards	Best Playback Singer	Won	Mohabbat	
1982	Nigar Awards	Best Singer	Won	Nigar Awards Committee	
1994	PTV Awards	Lifetime Achievement Award	Won	Herself	
2013	Pride of Performance	Award by the President of Pakistan	Won	Herself	
