= Nisar Bazmi =

Film music composer (1924 - 2007)

- Born: Syed Nisar Ahmed; 1 December 1924; Jalgaon, Khandesh, Maharashtra, British India
- Died: 22 March 2007 (aged 83); Karachi, Sindh, Pakistan
- Occupations: Composer & music director of films
- Years active: 1944 – 2007
- Awards: Pride of Performance Award by the President of Pakistan in 1994; Won 5 Nigar Awards during his long career

Nisar Bazmi (1 December 1924 – 22 March 2007) was a composer and music director of Indian and Pakistan film industry.

Nisar Bazmi was known as one of the accomplished musicians of South Asia. He also introduced new singers like Alamgir and Mehnaz Begum. The duo of composers Laxmikant–Pyarelal were musicians with Bazmi in India before the partition. Bazmi is primarily remembered for his compositions in the voice of playback singer Ahmed Rushdi.

== Early life and career ==
Syed Nisar Ahmed, was the son of Syed Qudrat Ali. He was born in 1924 in Jalgaon in Khandesh area of Maharashtra state, India. He did not belong to an artistic family. In fact, his family was extremely poor. He had to join Yasin Khan's Qawwali Group, a noted Qawwal in Mumbai at that time, as 'humnawa' (companion) at age 11.

He possessed no prior musical background. In the late 1930s, a prominent Indian musician of Bombay, Khan Saheb Aman Ali Khan was convinced by Nisar Bazmi's musical interest and taught him music for four years. Equipped with artistic know-how, young Nisar Bazmi, who was just 13 at the time, quickly mastered the various ragas and the musical instruments. In 1939, the All India Radio hired him as an artist. In 1944, he composed some songs for a drama, "Nadir Shah Durrani", which was broadcast from the Bombay Radio Station. The songs were sung by Rafiq Ghaznavi and Amirbai Karnataki. After this initial success, Nisar Bazmi "started earning 50 rupees a month - a respectable salary in those days."

=== In India ===
Nisar Bazmi composed music for film "Jamana Paar", which was released in 1946. At this time, he also changed his name to Nisar Bazmi. He composed music for forty films in India. Twenty eight films were released during his stay in India. The rest of the movies were released in India after he emigrated to Pakistan.

=== In Pakistan ===
Nisar Bazmi came to visit his relatives in Pakistan in 1962. Here he met veteran film producer Fazal Ahmad Karim Fazli who invited him to compose music for Pakistani films. "Mr Bazmi accepted the offer and decided to settle in Pakistan."

His first song in Pakistan was "Mohabbat mei tere sar ki qasam" (singers, Ahmed Rushdi, Noor Jahan) for the 1964 film "Aisa bhi hota hai". He also composed many songs for Runa Laila, Ahmed Rushdi, Mehdi Hassan, Naheed Akhtar Faisal Nadeem, Khursheed Nurali (Sheerazi), and Saleem Shahzaad. He had trained many of the modern composers. His closest student/assistant was Badar uz Zaman, the famous classical singer and composer, who remained associated with him for 18 years. Nisar Bazmi received many Nigar Awards for his achievements and composed music for 140 films in all during his career.

== Music and popular film songs of Nisar Bazmi ==
Film Song	Singers	Song Lyrics By	Film and year
""Mohabbat Mei Tere Sar Ki Qasam"	Ahmed Rushdi, Noor Jehan	Masroor Anwar	film Aisa Bhi Hota Hai (1965)
"Ho Tamanna Aur Kya Jaan-E-Tamanna Aap Hain"	Noor Jehan	Masroor Anwar	film Aisa Bhi Hota Hai (1965)
"Shama Ka Shola Bharak Raha He, Dil Perwan Dharak Raha He"	Mala	Mushir Kazmi	film Aadil (1966)
"Chalo Achha Hua Tum Bhool Gaye"	Noor Jehan	Fayyaz Hashmi	film Lakhon Mein Aik (1967)
'Bari Mushkil Se Hoa Tera Mera Saath Piya"	Noor Jehan	Tanvir Naqvi	film Lakhon Me Aik (1967)
"Yun Zindagi Ki Rah Me, Takta Gaya Koi"	Mehdi Hasan	Masroor Anwar	fim Aag (1967)
"Mausam Haseen He Laikin, Tum Sa Haseen Nahi He"	Ahmed Rushdi	Masroor Anwar	film Aag (1967)
"Ïk Sitam Aur Meri Jan, Abhi Jan Baqi He"	Mehdi Hasan	Masroor Anwar	film Saiqa (1968)
"Ae Baharon Gawah Rehna"	Ahmed Rushdi	Masroor Anwar	film Saiqa (1968)
"Aisey Bhi Hain Meharban"	Ahmed Rushdi	Masroor Anwar	film Jaisay Jaantay Nahin (1969)
"Mausam Haseen Hai Laikin Tum Sa Haseen Nahin Hai"	Ahmed Rushdi, Mala	Masroor Anwar	film Jaisay Jaantay Nahin (1969)
"Kuchh Loag Rooth Kar Bhi Lagte Hain Kitne Pyaare"	Noor Jehan	Masroor Anwar	film Andaleeb (1969)
"Mein Teray Ajnabi Shehar Mein, Dhoondta Phir Raha Hoo Tujhe"	Mujeeb Alam	Masroor Anwar	fim Shama Aur Perwana (1970)
"Mein Tera Sheher Chorr Jaoon Ga"	Mujeeb Alam	Saifuddin Saif	fim Shama Aur Perwana (1970)
"Ranjish Hi Sahi"	Mehdi Hassan	Ahmad Faraz	film Mohabbat (1972)
"Yeh Mehfil Jo Aaj Saji He, Is Mehfil Me He Koi Humsa"	Tahira Syed	Qateel Shifai	film Mohabbat (1972)
"Mohay Aaii Na Jag Say Laaj, Mein Itna Zor Say Naachi Aaj, Ke Ghunghroo Toot Gaey"	Mala	Qateel Shifai	film Naz (1969)
"Mere Dil Ki Mehfil Saja Deinay Waley"	Ahmed Rushdi, Noor Jehan	Masroor Anwar	film Andaleeb (1969)
"Lag Rahi Hai Mujhey Aaj Sari Fiza Ajnabi"	Ahmed Rushdi	Masroor Anwar	Anjuman (1970)
"Hoey Hoey Dil Dharkay, Mein Tum Say Yeh Kaisay Kahun, Kehti Hai Meri Nazar Shukria"	Runa Laila	Masroor Anwar	Anjuman (1970)
"Aap Dil Ki Anjuman Me, Husn Ban ker Aa Gai"	Runa Laila	Masroor Anwar	Anjuman (1970)
"Izhaar Bhi Mushkil He, Kuch Keh Bhi Nahi Sakte"	Noor Jahan	Saifuddin Saif	Anjum (1970)
"Ik Husn Ki Devi Se Mujhe Pyar Hoa Tha"	Mehdi Hassan	Shevan Rizvi	film Meri Zindagi He Naghma (1972)
" Katay Na Kuttay Re Ratya Saiyan Intizar Me"	Runa Laila	Saifuddin Saif	film Umrao Jan Ada (1972)
"Mane Na Bairi Balma, Oo Mora Man Tarpae"	Runa Laila, Irene Perveen	Saifudddin Saif	film Umrao Jan Ada (1972)
"Jo Bacha Tha, Woh Lutanay KeLie Aye Hein"	Noor Jahan	Saifuddin Saif	film Umrao Jan Ada (1972)
"Bol Ri Gurria Bol Zara"	Nayyara Noor	Masroor Anwar	film Aas (1973)
"Sanwaray, Jia Tarpay, Nena Barsay"	Noor Jehan	Fayyaz Hashmi	film Naag Mani (1972)
"Sanwaray, Mo Se Preet Nibhana Re"	Noor Jehan	Fayyaz Hashmi	film Naag Mani (1972)
"Hum Chalay To Humaray, Sang Sang Nazare Chale"	Alamgir	Masroor Anwar	fil Jageer (1975)
"Allah Hee Allah Kia Karo"	Naheed Akhtar	Masroor Anwar	film Pehchan (1975)
'Mera Pyar Tere Jeewan Ke Sang Rahe Ga"	Mehdi Hasan	Masroor Anwar	film Pehchan (1975)
"Pyar Ki Yaad Nigaho Mein Sajaaye Rakhna"	Naheed Akhtar	Masroor Anwar	film Talash (1975)

- "Mohabbat Mein Tere Sar Ki Qasam Aisa Bhi Hota Hai" was his first big hit film song in Pakistan.

== Awards and recognition ==
- Pride of Performance Award in 1994 by the President of Pakistan
- Nigar Award - Nisar Bazmi won 'Best Music Director' award five times for different films

== Death and legacy ==
Nisar Bazmi died on 22 March 2007 in Karachi and was buried the next day near his residence in North Karachi.

A major Pakistani English-language newspaper commented after his death, "In the death of Nisar Bazmi, students of music in Pakistan have lost an opportunity to benefit from the experience of a virtuoso who scored 140 films in all."

"Nisar Bazmi was a thorough professional and a man of rare imagination. He used to study the storyline and the setting of a film before composing the music for a song."
