= Sudhir filmography =

Sudhir (real name Shah Zaman Khan) was a Pakistani film actor, director and producer. He made his film debut in the 1947 movie Farz and continued to work in Pakistani cinema through the 1980s. In the course of his career, he became known as an action hero, and appeared in a total of 173 films.

== Filmography ==
Sudhir's films are shown below. Each decade (1950s, 1960s, 1970s) are listed separately.

=== 1950s ===
- Dopatta (1952)
- Gumnam (1954)
- Sassi (1954)
- Toofan (1955)
- Dulla Bhatti (1956)
- Mahi Munda (1956)
- Chhoti Begum (1956)
- Baaghi (1956)
- Guddi Gudda (1956)
- Daata (1957)
- Yakke Wali (1957)
- Nooran (1957)
- Anarkali (1958)
- Aankh Ka Nasha (1958)
- Jatti (1958)
- Akhri Nishan (1958)
- Kartar Singh
- Jhoomer (1958)

=== 1960s ===
- Ek Thi Maa (1960)
- Ajab Khan (1961)
- Gul Bakawli (1961)
- Ghalib (1961)
- Baghawat (1963)
- Kala Pani (1963)
- Chacha Khamkhawa
- Daachi (1964)
- Mama Jee
- Ghadaar
- Farangi (1964)
- Phanney Khan (1965)
- Mann Mouji (1965)
- Jeedar (1965)
- Josh
- Koh-e-Noor
- Abba Jee
- Jani Dushman
- Maidan (1968)
- Mafroor
- Chann Makhna (1968)
- Pagri Sanbhal Jatta (1968)
- Ek Hi Rasta (1968)
- Her Fun Moula
- Main Zinda Hun
- Buzdil
- Bhaian Di Jori (1969)
- Waryam (1969)
- Sheran de Puttar Sher (1969)

=== 1970s ===
- Maa Puttar (1970)
- Behram
- Charhda Suraj (1970)
- Sher Puttar
- Yaar Badshah
- Sajawal
- Ghairat Mera Naa
- Ishq Bina Ki Jeena
- Khoon Paseena
- Heera Moti
- Puttar Da Pyar
- Nizam (1972)
- Thaah (1972)
- Nishan
- Bahadra
- Lottery (1974)
- Jadoo (1974)
- Sir da badla
- Dhan Jigra Maa Da
- Soorat Aur Seerat
- Sultana Daku (1975)
- Baaghi Te Farangi
- Ann Daata
- Do Chor
- Dushan Ki Talash
- General Bakht Khan (1979)

=== 1980s ===
- Khan-e-Azam (1981)
- Maidan (1982)
- Zalzala (1987)
- Son of Ann Daata (1987)

=== Roles with other famous actors ===
Sudhir starred in the majority of Pakistani films made during the 1950s, 1960s and 1980s, and worked with several other Pakistani movie stars, including:

- Mazhar Shah (21 films)
- Allauddin (21)
- Talish (17)
- Habib (12)
- Iqbal Hassan (11)
- Muhammad Ali (10)
- Sultan Rahi (10)
- Sawan (9)
- Ilyas Kashmiri (9)
- Asad Bukhari (8)
- Adeeb (5)
- Shahid (5)
- Akmal (4)
- Yusuf Khan (4)
- Inayat Hussain Bhatti (3)
- Waheed Murad (3)
- Ejaz Durrani (3)

Sudhir worked with actresses including Asha Posley, Rehana, Husna, Jamila Razzaq, Bahar, Deeba, Ghazala, Roohi Bano, as well as the following actresses:

- Firdous (28 films)
- Neeli (23)
- Naghma (22 films)
- Sabiha Khanum (14 films)
- Musarrat Nazir (12 films)
- Saloni (7 films)
- Aasia (6 films)
- Zeba (6 films)
- Rani (5 films)
- Noor Jehan (4 films)
- Rukhsana (3 films)
- Rozina (3 films)
- Musarrat Shaheen (3 films)
- Gulshan Ara (2 films)
- Meena Shorey (2 films)
- Nayyar Sultana (2 films)
- Laila (2 films)
- Aliya (2 films)
- Najma (2 films)
- Shamim Ara (2 films)

=== Directorial roles ===
He directed two films:

- Sahil (1960)
- Baghawat (1963)

=== Popular film songs ===
Film songs which were picturized on him that became hits included:

- Aaj yeh kis ko nazar ke samne pata hun main...

(Fazal Hussain - Toofan 1954)

- Jhootiye jehan diye, kachiye zaban diye...

(Inayat Hussain Bhatti - Mahi Munda 1956)

- Panchhi te Perdeshi, pyar jadun vi pandey...

(Munir Hussain - Nooran 1957)

- Ik Berhi wich do sawar, Ik Perdeshi ik Mutiyar

(Munir Hussain - Nooran 1957)

- Kar sari khataen muaaf meri, tere darr peh main aan gira

(Salim Raza - Daata 1957)

- Teinu sada pehla salaam, peetey shahadat de jaam...

(Inayat Hussain Bhatti - Kartar Singh (1959)

- Tange wala khair mangda, Tanga Lahore da huwe te pawen Jhang da

(Masood Rana - Daachi 1964)

- Ik nikki jnni gall uttun mukh morhe ke, Dildar chaliya...

(Masood Rana - Pind di Kurri - 1968)

- A Maa pyari Maa, sadi bhuliyan too Phull khirde ne..

(Masood Rana - Weryam 1969)

- Ik Parri, harri bharri...

(Ahmad Rushdi - Soorat aur Seerat 1975)
