= Eveready Pictures =

Pakistani production company

- Formerly: Eveready Productions
- Company type: Private
- Industry: Entertainment
- Founded: 1947
- Founder: J.C. Anand
- Headquarters: Karachi, Pakistan
- Key people: Satish Anand (Director and CEO)
- Divisions: Film production Film distribution Television production Marketing; Merchandising; Licensing
- Website: Eveready Group

Eveready Pictures is a Pakistani film and television production and distribution company. Since its inception in the 1940s, the company has grown to be one of the largest film studios in Pakistan. The company has produced nearly 100 movies and distributed over 700 movies.

== Films produced ==
Year	Title	Director	Cast	Ref(s)
1954	Sassi	Daud Chand	Sabiha Khanum, Sudhir, Asha Posley	
1955	Heer	Nazir Ahmed Khan	Swaran Lata, Inayat Hussain Bhatti, M. Ajmal, Zeenat Begum	
1956	Hatim	Daud Chand	Sudhir, Sabiha Khanum, Asha Posley, Sultan Rahi, M. Ajmal	
1956	Miss 56	R.K.Shorey	Meena Shorey, Shamim Ara, Deeba, Aslam Pervaiz	
1957	Nooran	M. A. Khan	Sudhir, Noor Jehan, Saeed Khan Rangeela	
1957	Ishq-e-Laila	Munshi Dil	Sabiha Khanum, Santosh Kumar, Asha Posley, M. Ajmal, Allauddin	
1957	Murad	Daud Chand	Asha Posley, Syed Kamal, Sultan Rahi, Sabiha Khanum	
1957	Noor-e-Islam	Nazir	Naeem Hashmi, Swaran Lata, Nazar, Nazir	
1958	Hasrat	Munshi Dil	Allauddin, Yusuf Khan, Santosh Kumar	
1959	Alam Ara	Daud Chand	Shamim Ara, Akmal, Nasira, Ilyas Kashmiri, Asha Poslay	
1960	Saheli	S. M. Yusuf	Nayyar Sultana, Shamim Ara, Darpan, Bahar, Aslam Pervaiz	
1963	Dulhan	S. M. Yusuf	Nayyar Sultana, Habib, Darpan, Shamim Ara	
1975	Mera Naam Hai Mohabbat	Shabab Kervani	Babra Sharif, Ghulam Mohiuddin, Zarqa	
1985	Qurbani	Tehsin Khan	Yasmin Khan, Badar Munir, Sanita Khan, Nageena	
1993	Hathi Mere Sathi	Shamim Ara	Reema Khan, Mohsin Khan, Afzal Khan, Shafqat Cheema	
1995	Jeeva	Syed Noor	Babar Ali, Resham, Nadeem, Jawed Sheikh	

== Films distributed ==
In addition to the films produced by Eveready Pictures since 1947, the following films from other banners have been distributed, in domestic and/or overseas markets, by the company.

- Heer
- Mahal
- Barsaat
- Awaara
- Chanda
- Anjuman
- International Guerillas
- Kabhi Pyar Na Karna
- Khamosh Raho
- Once Upon ay Time in Mumbai Dobaara!
- Mah e Mir
- Mehrunisa V Lub U
- Pinky Memsaab
- Chhalawa
- Hijrat
- Na Maloom Afraad
- Ishq Positive
- Bin Roye
- Bajrangi Bhaijaan
- Chupan Chupai
- Verna
- Taj Mahal: An Eternal Love Story
- Maan Jao Naa
- Zero
- Sawaal 700 Crore Dollar Ka
- Parwaaz Hai Junoon
- Bachaana
- Avengers: Infinity War
- Tick Tock
- Ready Steady No
- Khel Khel Mein
- Ishrat Made in China
- Parde Mein Rehne Do
- Chakkar
- Kamli
- Gunjal

== Television ==
The television dramas produced by Eveready Pictures are:

Year	Title	Genre	Network	Episodes	Refs
2007	Waqt	Drama	ARY Digital	30	
2008	Koonj	Drama	Hum TV	28	
2011	Bhanwar	Drama	Hum TV	27	
2011	Choti Si Kahani	Drama	ARY Digital	27	
2012	Raju Rocket	Sitcom	Hum TV	22	
2014	Dil Apna Preet Parayi	Drama	Hum TV	30	
2014	Nestlé Nido Young Stars	Reality show	ARY Digital	27	
2015	Sehra Main Safar	Drama	Hum TV	27	
2016	Mol	Drama	Hum TV	27	
2016	Bad Gumaan	Drama	Hum TV	30	
2018	Karamat-e-Ishq	Drama	TV One	27	
2019	Janbaaz	Drama	Express TV	20	
2020	Mein Jeena Chahti Hoon	Drama	Express TV	14	
2022	Main Aisi Kyun Houn	Drama	Express TV	5	
