= List of Pakistani films of 1953 =

A list of films produced in Pakistan in 1953 (see 1953 in film): A total of 10 films were released in the country.

== 1953 ==
Opening	Title	Genre	Language	Director	Cast	Notes
9 January 1953	Ghulam	Social film	Urdu	Anwar Kamal Pasha	Sabiha Khanum, Santosh Kumar, Shammi	
27 February 1953	Sailaab	Social film	Urdu		Sabiha Khanum, Masood, Hamaliawala	
13 June 1953	Aavaz	Social film	Urdu	Khadim Mohiudin	Gulshan Ara, Santosh Kumar	Eid-ul-Fitr (1372 hijri), Saturday, June 13, 1953
13 June 1953	Barkha	Social film	Urdu	Shaikh Hassan	Nazar, Asha Posley, Sabiha Khanum	
13 June 1953	Shehri Babu	Romantic, musical film	Punjabi	Nazir	waran Lata, Santosh, Nazar, M. Ismael, Allauddin, Inayat Hussain Bhatti, Shahana, Ghulam Mohammad, (Guest: Zubaida Khanum)	Producer & Director Nazir selected Santosh as hero with his wife-heronie Sawarn Lata in this famous romantic and melodious film from the 50s.
7 August 1953	Mehbooba	Social film	Urdu	Luqman	Shammi, Santosh Kumar, Asha Posley	
9 October 1953	Ilzam	Social film	Urdu	Rafiq Anwar	Shammi, Rafiq Anwar, Naeem Hashmi	This film was written by Naeem Hashmi. The poets were Yazdani Jalandhri & Naeem Hashmi.
6 November 1953	Gulnar	Romantic, musical film	Urdu	Imtiyaz Ali Taj	Noor Jehan, Santosh Kumar, Bibbo, Zarif, Shahnawaz	
27 November 1953	Tarrap	Social film	Urdu	Aslam Irani	Shammi, Sudhir, Allauddin	
25 December 1953	Aaghosh	Social film	Urdu	Murtaza Gilani	Gulshan Ara, M. Ismail, Santosh Kumar, Sabiha Khanum	

== See also ==
- 1953 in Pakistan
