= List of Pakistani films of 1954 =

A list of films produced in Pakistan in 1954 (see 1954 in film) and in the Urdu language:

== 1954 ==
Title	Director	Cast	Genre	Notes
1954
Deewar		Gulshan Ara, Sudhir, Allauddin		
Gumnaam	Anwar Kamal Pasha	Sabiha Khanum, Sudhir, Ragni, M. Ismael, Asif Jah, Nasreen, Ghulam Mohammad, Himalaya Wala	Musical drama	The film was released on March 26, 1954 and had a super-hit film song by Iqbal Bano with music by Master Inayat Hussain.
Mujrim		Gulshan Ara, Yousuf, Allauddin		
Perwaz		Sabiha Khanum, Yousuf Khan, Asha Posley, Nazar		Actor Yousuf Khan began his career from this film.
Raat Ki Baat		Sabiha Khanum, Santosh Kumar, Allauddin		
Ruhi	W.Z. Ahmed	Shammi, Santosh Kumar, Hamalia Wala		This was the first banned film in Pakistan. It had music by Rasheed Attre.
Sassi	Daud Chand	Shah Nawaz, Nazar, Asha Posley, Sabiha Khanum, Sudhir	Musical	The film was released on June 3, 1954 and celebrated its Silver Jubilee at the Pakistani cinemas. Music by Ghulam Ahmed Chishti.

== See also ==
- 1954 in Pakistan
