= Sham Dhale (1960 film) =

1960 film

- شام ڈھلے
- Directed by: Santosh Kumar
- Produced by: Santosh Kumar
- Starring: Santosh Kumar; Sabiha Khanum; Allauddin; Rukhsana; Nazar; Rakhshi
- Cinematography: Suhail Hashmi
- Edited by: M. Akram
- Music by: Rashid Attre
- Production company: Cressant Films
- Release date: 10 December 1960
- Country: Pakistan
- Language: Urdu

Sham Dhale (transl. Evening falls) is a Pakistani romance drama film directed and produced by Santosh Kumar, and was the only film that Kumar ever directed and produced. He also played the lead role in the film opposite Sabiha Khanum. The music of the film was composed by Rashid Attre.

Although a commercially average film of the year 1960, it became popular due to Ghulam Mustafa Tabassum's ghazal Sau Baar Chaman Mehka, Sau Baar Bahar Aaee, performed by Naseem Begum for the film.

The film won 4 Nigar Awards, at the annual Nigar Awards ceremony.

== Cast ==
- Santosh Kumar
- Sabiha Khanam
- Allauddin
- Rukhsana
- Nazar
- Azad
- Rakhshi
- Sahira

== Music ==
All music is composed by Rashid Attre

Shaam Dhalay
No.	Title	Lyrics	Singer (s)	Length
1.	"Sau Baar Chaman Mehka, Sau Baar Bahar Aaee"	Ghulam Mustafa Tabassum	Naseem Begum
2.	"Shokh Hawayen, Meri Chunri Urayen"	Tanvir Naqvi	Naseem Begum
3.	"Balma Na Sata, Ab To Maan Ja"	Tanvir Naqvi	Naseem Begum
4.	"Murli Bajaye Ja, Dil Mein Samaye Ja"	Tanvir Naqvi	Naseem Begum
5.	"Palkon Pe Ashkon Ke Deep Jalay, Shaam Dhalay"	Tufail Hoshiarpuri	Naseem Begum
6.	"Meri Mast Jawani Lehrai"	Ghulam Mustafa Tabassum	Zubaida Khanum
7.	"Mohabbat Aik Dault Thi"	Ghulam Mustafa Tabassum	Munir Hussain
8.	"Preet Pe Jab Shaam Dhal Jaye Gi"	Ghulam Mustafa Tabassum	Naseem Begum

== Awards ==
Sham Dhale received 4 Nigar Awards in the following categories:

Category	Awardee
Best Lyricist	Tanvir Naqvi
Best Female Playback Singer	Naseem Begum
Best Editing	M. Akram
Best Sound	Taj Malik
