= Hazin Qadri =

Film songwriter and screenwriter (1926–1991)

- Born: Bashir Ahmad; 9 April 1926; Gujranwala District, Punjab, British India
- Died: 3 March 1991 (aged 64)
- Occupations: Film song lyricist, screenwriter
- Years active: 1950 – 1988

Bashir Ahmad (9 April 1926 – 19 March 1991), known as Hazin Qadri, was a Punjabi film song lyricist and film screenwriter from Pakistan.

== Early life ==
Qadri was born Bashir Ahmad in a small village 'Raja Tamoli' near Gujranwala, British India on 9 April 1926. He could not complete his education beyond the elementary or primary school due to poverty. As a young man, he was eager to get an opportunity to try his luck in the then newly established Pakistani film industry after 1947. After two years of struggle, he was given a chance to write his first film song by the veteran film producer and director Anwar Kamal Pasha for his upcoming film Do Ansoo (1950), which turned out to be a commercial hit.

== Career ==
Qadri's second film was Nath (1952), for which he wrote all the songs, script, story and dialogue. This film did not achieve commercial success.

Then his second hit breakthrough film song came in Pattan (1955 film):

- Saada Sajra Pyar, Kahay Baar Baar, Keetay Hoey Qarar Bhul Jaen Na Sung by Zubaida Khanum and Inayat Hussain Bhatti, music composed by G.A. Chishti

In the same year, Qadri had two more big hit films namely Heer (1955) and Pattay Khan (1955). After that, he had many commercially successful films such as Nooran (1957), Daachi (1964), Hath Jori (1964) and many more hit films followed them. He wrote a total of 291 scripts for films during his career.

== Popular film songs ==
Song title	Lyrics by	Music by	Film notes
Saada Sajra Pyar, Kahay Baar Baar, Keetay Hoey Qarar Bhul Jaen Na	Hazeen Qadri	G.A. Chishti	Sung by Zubaida Khanum and Inayat Hussain Bhatti, film Pattan (1955)
Beirri Wich Khailia Ae Mohabbatan Da Khel Oye, Rab Ne Karaya Sahda Pattana Tay Meil Oye	Hazeen Qadri	G.A. Chishti	Sung by Inayat Hussain Bhatti and Zubaida Khanum, film Pattan (1955)
Gallan Sun Ke Mahi De Naal Merian, Dopatta Be-Iman Ho Gaya, Wey Chandra Shaitan Ho Gaya	Hazeen Qadri	Rashid Attre	Sung by Zubaida Khanum, film Shehri Babu (1953)
Baddal Nuun Hath Laanwan, Tay Uddi Uddi Janwan Hawa De Naal	Hazeen Qadri	Safdar Hussain	Sung by Munawar Sultana, film Heer (1955)
Sahnoon Sajanan Dey Milnay Di Taang Aey	Hazeen Qadri	Safdar Hussain	Sung by Inayat Hussain Bhatti, film Heer (1955)
Aaja Meri Pharlay Baanh	Hazeen Qadri	Akhtar Hussain Akhian	Sung by Noor Jehan, film Pattay Khan (1955)
Kalli Kalli Jaan Dukh Lakh Tay Karore Wey	Hazeen Qadri	Akhtar Hussain Akhian	Sung by Noor Jehan, film Pattay Khan (1955)
Morr Lay Mohar Channa	Hazeen Qadri	Akhtar Hussain Akhian	Sung by Noor Jehan, film Pattay Khan (1955)
Teinun Bhull Gayyan Sahdian Wey Chahwaan, Wey Assan Teinun Ki Aakhna	Hazeen Qadri	G.A. Chishti	Sung by Kausar Parveen, film Peengaan (1956)
Panchhi Te Pardesi Aake Turr Jaanday	Hazeen Qadri	Safdar Hussain	Sung by Noor Jehan and Munir Hussain, film Nooran (1957)
Taangay Wala Khair Mangda	Hazeen Qadri	G.A. Chishti	Sung by Masood Rana, film Daachi (1964)
Saadi Ajab Kahani Ae, Bhull Kay Puranay Dukhrray	Hazeen Qadri	G.A. Chishti	Sung by Mala and Masood Rana, film Mera Mahi (1964)
Mahi Wey Sahnun Bhul Na Jaavin	Hazeen Qadri	Master Abdullah	Sung by Noor Jehan, film Malangi (1965 film)
Ballay Ballay, Bhei Lokaan Bhanay Chann Charhya, Ballay Ballay, Bhei Lokaan Bhanay Phull Uddya	Hazeen Qadri	Master Abdullah	Sung by Mala and others, film Malangi (1965 film)
Chhad Chali Babula, Terian Mein Galian	Hazeen Qadri	Master Abdullah	Sung by Mala, film Malangi (1965 film)
Geo Dhola, Tutt Gayi Anjuan Di Ajj Mala	Hazeen Qadri	Salim Iqbal	Sung by Noor Jehan, film Phannay Khan (1965)
Aanay Da Glass Piyo, Aanay Da Glass	Hazeen Qadri	Tufail Farooqi	Sung by Masood Rana, film Man Mauji (1965)
Sajna Nay Buhay Aggay Chikk Taan Lei	Hazeen Qadri	G.A. Chishti	Sung by Masood Rana, film Bharia Mela (1966)
Teinu Samnay Batha Kay Sharmanwan, Tay Eihu Mera Jee Karda	Hazeen Qadri	Wazir Afzal	Sung by Noor Jehan, film Dil Da Jaani (1967)
Sayyo Ni Meray Dil Da Jaani, Hai Ni Mukh Morr Gaya Jay	Hazeen Qadri	Wazir Afzal	Sung by Noor Jehan, film Dil Da Jaani (1967)
O' Chann Meray Makhana, Tey Hass Ke Ik Pal Eidhar Takna, Sahda Mushkil Ho Gaya Bachna	Hazeen Qadri	G. A. Chishti	Sung by Inayat Hussain Bhatti, film Chann Makhna (1968)
Kehnday Ne Nainan Teray Kole Rehna	Hazeen Qadri	Wazir Afzal	Sung by Noor Jehan, film Juma Janj Naal (1968)
Wagdi Nadi Da Pani, Enjh Ja Kay Murr Nahin Aanda	Hazeen Qadri	Wajahat Attre	Sung by Noor Jehan, film Ishq Na Puchhay Zaat (1969)
Sathun Kahnu Pherian Nei Akhian Wey Babua, Allah Karey Doonian Taraqqian Wey Babua	Hazeen Qadri	Nazir Ali	Sung by Noor Jehan, film Genterman (1969)
Jaa Aj Tau Mein Teri	Hazeen Qadri	Wazir Afzal	Sung by Noor Jehan, film Yaar Mastanay (1974)
Kallian Na Jana, Sahde Naal Naal Chalo Ji	Hazeen Qadri	Wajahat Attre	Sung by Nahid Akhtar and Mehnaz Begum, film Aj Diyan Kurrian (1977)

== Death ==
Hazin Qadri died on 3 March 1991 at age 64. In his later years of life, he had a stroke and was suffering from paralysis and lived mostly homebound.
