= Peengan (1956 film) =

1956 film

- Directed by: Amin Malik
- Written by: Hazin Qadri
- Produced by: M. Nasim
- Starring: Musarrat Nazir; Asha Posley; Aslam Pervaiz; Allauddin
- Music by: Ghulam Ahmed Chishti
- Release date: 1956
- Country: Pakistan
- Language: Punjabi

Peengan is a 1956 Pakistani Punjabi-language film directed by Amin Malik.

== Cast ==
- Musarrat Nazir
- Aslam Pervaiz
- Asha Posley
- Allauddin
- Zarif

== Music ==
This film's music was composed by Ghulam Ahmed Chishti and the film song lyrics were by Hazin Qadri.

=== Tracks ===
Song title	Sung by	Lyrics by	Music by	Film notes
Chunni Lay Kay Sitarian Wali, Tay Mela Lutdi Phiran	Munawar Sultana	Hazin Qadri	G.A. Chishti	
Assan Laggian Torr Nibhanian, Wey Chhadd Ke Na Jaeen Dil Jaania	Zubaida Khanum and Fazal Hussain	G.A. Chishti	Ghulam Ahmed Chishti	
Gori Gori Dhuup Channan Kali Kali Chhaan Wey, Aaja Chann Mahi Teray Waari Waari Jaa'n Wey	Kausar Parveen	Hazin Qadri	G.A. Chishti	Peengan was an 'average film' at the box office but its songs and music became popular in 1956
Teinun Bhull Gayyan Sahdian Chahwaan, Wey Assan Teinun Kee Aakhna	Kausar Parveen	Hazin Qadri	G.A. Chishti	
