= Shehri Babu =

1953 film

Shehri Baboo
- Directed by: Nazir Ahmed Khan
- Written by: Baba Alam Siaposh
- Produced by: Nazir Ahmed Khan
- Starring: Swaran Lata; Santosh Kumar; M. Ismael; Nazar; Asha Posley; Allauddin
- Music by: Rashid Attre; Safdar Hussain (assistant)
- Release date: 13 June 1953
- Country: Pakistan
- Language: Punjabi

Shehri Babu is a 1953 Pakistani Punjabi-language film directed by Nazir Ahmed Khan. The lead roles were played by Santosh Kumar and Nazir's wife Swaran Lata.

== Cast ==
- Swaran Lata
- Santosh Kumar
- Asha Posley
- Allauddin
- Inayat Hussain Bhatti
- Nazar

== Soundtracks ==
Music for the film was rendered by Rashid Attre and song lyrics are by Tufail Hoshiarpuri, Hazin Qadri and Waris Ludhianvi. Playback singers are Zubaida Khanum, Munawar Sultana and Inayat Hussain Bhatti.

For Rashid Attre and Zubaida Khanum, Shehri Babu was a breakthrough film and also his first big musical hit in the newly-independent Pakistan.

Song title	Sung by	Lyrics by	Music by	Film notes
Gallan Sun Ke Mahi De Naal Merian, Dopatta Beimaan Ho Gaya, Ni Chandra Shaitan Ho Gaya	Zubaida Khanum	Hazin Qadri	Rashid Attre	
Mera Naram Kaalja Dol Gaya	Zubaida Khanum	Waris Ludhianvi	Rashid Attre	
Ik Kurri Di Cheez Gawachi, Palkay Chaita Aaway Ga	Inayat Hussain Bhatti and Zubaida Khanum	Waris Ludhianvi	Rashid Attre	
Raatan Merian Bana Ke Rabba Nehrian, Naseeban Waalay Taaray Dubb Gaey	Zubaida Khanum	Tufail Hoshiarpuri	Rashid Attre	
Bhagan Waleo, Naam Japo Maula Naam	Inayat Hussain Bhatti	Tufail Hoshiarpuri	Rashid Attre	
