= Ishq-e-Laila =

1957 Pakistani Urdu film

- Theatrical release poster
- Directed by: Munshi Dil
- Written by: Munshi Dil
- Screenplay by: Munshi Dil
- Based on: Layla and Majnun by: Nizami Ganjavi; a poem about a tragic love story
- Produced by: J.C. Anand
- Starring: Sabiha Khanum; Santosh Kumar; Allaudin; Ajmal; Zeenat Begum; M. Ismail; Maya Devi; Asha Posley; Imdad Hussain
- Music by: Safdar Hussain
- Distributed by: Eveready Pictures
- Release date: 12 April 1957 (Pakistan)
- Country: Pakistan
- Language: Urdu

Ishq-e-Laila is a 1957 Pakistani Urdu language fantasy romance film directed by Munshi Dil and produced by J.C. Anand. The film is primarily known for its blockbuster music by Safdar Hussain and lyrics by Qateel Shifai. It stars Sabiha Khanum, Santosh Kumar and Allaudin in the lead. In 2017, Lok Virsa Museum screened the film as part of special showcase of the feature films in the country.

It talks about Layla and Majnun, a tragic love story by Nizami Ganjavi. The film consists of twelve to fourteen songs, leading it to become the first and the only film of the Pakistani film industry with maximum number of songs recorded till century. The filmmakers are argued to have introduced central character in an informal manner, leading it to create a discrepancy between the film story and the poem. During the filming process, the protagonist actor appeared well dressed with a good physical appearance, contradict to the two lovers of the poem who appears in a poor health condition due to distress events experienced during their relationship span.

== Cast ==
- Santosh Kumar as Qais, playing protagonist character of Majnun
- Sabiha Khanum as Laila, playing as central role in film as Majnun's lover
- Allauddin
- Asha Posley
- M. Ajmal

== Crew ==
- AH Rana Production Manager

== Soundtrack ==
All lyrics are written by Qateel Shifai; all music is composed by Safdar Hussain.

No.	Title	Singer (s)	Length
1.	"Sitaro Tum To So Jao"	Iqbal Bano
2.	"Mohabbat Ka Janaza"	Inayat Hussain Bhatti
3.	"Chand takey chup chup"	Saleem Raza, Zubaida Khanum
4.	"Ae Bad-e-Saba"	Zubaida Khanum
5.	"Bata Ae Asmaan Walay"	Inayat Hussain Bhatti
6.	"Chand Si Teri Jabeen"	Inayat Hussain Bhatti
7.	"Dil Say Jo Dil Takraye"	Zubaida Khanum
8.	"Hey Meri Majboor Jawani"	Zubaida Khanum
9.	"Ik halki halki aahat"	Iqbal Bano
