= Dil Ke Tukre =

Pakistani drama film

- Directed by: Nazir Ajmeri
- Written by: Nazir Ajmeri
- Produced by: Nazir Ajmeri
- Starring: Shamim Ara; Muhammad Ali; Habib; Deeba; Rangeela; Asha Posley; Adeeb; Nighat Sultana
- Music by: Safdar Hussain
- Release date: 1 May 1965
- Running time: approx. 2 hours
- Country: Pakistan
- Language: Urdu

Dil Ke Tukre is a 1965 Pakistani drama film directed, produced and written by Nazir Ajmeri.

It stars Shamim Ara, Muhammad Ali, Deeba and Habib in lead roles. Music was composed by Safdar Hussain. The film was released on 7 May 1965, and became a silver jubilee hit.

== Plot ==
The story revolves around Akbar, a hardworking tonga driver who supports his ailing father, widowed sister Hamida, and her children. Akbar's life takes a turn when he saves a tawaif named Gohar from being kidnapped. Gohar falls in love with Akbar and wants him to rescue her from her life of shame.

Meanwhile, a wealthy man and Akbar's neighbour named Rashid is searching for his sister who was kidnapped 13 years ago. His wife, Mussrat, befriends Akbar and considers him her brother. However, their lives become entangled in a web of deceit and kidnapping.

Kidnappings of children are rampant in the city. One of the members of this gang gets employed at Rashid's house as a servant. One day, Rashid visits Gohar's kotha with his friend Nawab Rustam, but Nawab Rustam cleverly informs his wife Musarrat about his whereabouts. While Rashid is trying to uncover Gohar's true identity in the room, Mussarat arrives and humiliates Gohar before taking Rashid away.

Akbar visits Gohar one day but is attacked by the henchmen of the kotha and forced to leave. Meanwhile, Rashid's servant kidnaps his daughter Najma. The head of the kotha, tired of Gohar's antics, devises a plan to send her back to the people she was bought from, while also informing Akbar about the situation.

Akbar chases the henchmen and arrives at the location, where he finds Gohar along with Mussarat's daughter Najma. He also discovers that Nawab Rustam is the leader of the gang. It is revealed that Gohar is actually Rashid's long-lost sister. Upon learning that his secret has been exposed, Nawab Rustam's men demand a large ransom from Rashid in exchange for Najma. However, Rashid beats them when they try to deceive him. Meanwhile, Rashid's servant alerts the police, who arrive and arrest Nawab Rustam's henchmen. Akbar's horse returns empty, causing concern for his family. At the police's request, Akbar's sister Hamida talks to the tamed horse, which leads them to the location where Akbar is being held.

A fight ensues between Akbar's family and Nawab Rustam's henchmen, with the police arriving to apprehend the culprits. Nawab Rustam tries to escape with Najma but is shot by the police while attempting to flee deceitfully. Akbar reveals to Rashid that Gohar is his long-lost sister, and the family is finally reunited.

== Cast ==
- Shamim Ara as Musarrat
- Muhammad Ali as Akbar
- Habib as Rashid
- Deeba as Gohar
- Rangeela as Gullu Bunnd
- Asha Posley as head of the kotha
- Adeeb as Nawab Rustam
- Nighat Sultana as Hamida
- S. Gul as Inspector
- Chham Chham
- Oma Devi

== Music and soundtrack ==
All lyrics are written by Fayyaz Hashmi; all music is composed by Safdar Hussain

Dil Ke Tukre
No.	Title	Singer (s)	Length
1.	"Zindagi Tum Se Mili"	Mala, Munir Hussain
2.	"Ja O Ghazi Ja, Mere Chand Se Bhaiyya Ko Dhoond Ke La"	Mala and chorus
3.	"Yeh Dunya Haseen Hai, HaseenoN Ke Dum Se"	Mala, Irene Perveen, Zahida Parveen and chorus
4.	"Main Sadqay, Main Wari Meri Jaan"	Mala
5.	"Kisi Se Haal-e-Dil, Aaj Agar Ham Keh Nahin Sakte"	Mala
6.	"Hum Tangay Waoe Hi, Bhaiyya"	Ahmed Rushdi

== Release and reception ==
Dil Ke Tukre was premiered in the Eroze Cinema of Karachi in May 1965. Although not a very successful film, it became a silver jubilee hit with a run of 25 weeks.

In a review by The Illustrated Weekly of Pakistan, the film was labelled as "a cliche-ridden formula film".
