= Mukhra (1958 film) =

1958 film

- Directed by: Jaffar Malik
- Story by: Shabab Kiranvi
- Produced by: Mian Ehsan-ul-Haq; Santosh Kumar
- Starring: Afzal; Allauddin; Ilyas Kashmiri; Sabiha Khanum; Santosh Kumar; Anjum; Darpan; Bibbo; Asha Posley; Nayyar Sultana; Yasmin
- Music by: Rasheed Attre
- Distributed by: Crescent Pictures of Mian Ehsan
- Release date: 29 June 1958
- Country: Pakistan
- Language: Punjabi

Mukhra is a super-hit 1958 Pakistani Punjabi-language film. Many of its songs became very popular due to its superb music by Rasheed Attre.

== Cast ==
- Mohammad Afzal- Himalaywala
- Allauddin
- Anjum
- Darpan
- Ilyas Kashmiri
- Sabiha Khanum - Sabiha
- Santosh Kumar - Santosh
- Diljeet Mirza (comedian)
- Ghulam Mohammed
- Nazar (comedian)
- Asha Posley
- Bibbo
- Nayyar Sultana
- Yasmin

== Reception ==
This film was rated as a "hit" Punjabi film of 1958 in Pakistan.

== Soundtrack ==
The music of the film was composed by Rasheed Attre with famous singers of the time including Zubaida Khanum, Naseem Begum, Munir Hussain and Sain Akhtar. The popular film songs were written by Waris Ludhianvi.

- "Doray khich ke na kajra paayye maapiyan de pind kurriay", Sung by Zubaida Khanum
- "Dilla, thehr ja yaar da nazara lain de", Sung by Munir Hussain
- "Main dardi Surma na pawan, Akhaan wich mahi wasda..." Zubaida Khanum
- (Bhairvi raag on violin)
- "Mera dil channa, kachh da khadona...", Sung by Zubaida Khanum
- "Naley nach naley Gon, te pambeeri wangu ponh...", Sung by Naseem Begum, Munir Hussain
- "Mahi sahnu takna te assan sharmana...", Sung by Zubaida Khanum
- "Dilla, thehr ja yaar da nazara lain de", Sung by Zubaida Khanum
- "Meri Akh tera Dil na chura le...", Sung by Zubaida Khanum
- "Meinu dasdi chanani teri, we chhup ja chann...", Sung by Zubaida Khanum
- "Mere do mastaney nain, raat din rehnde...", Sung by Zubaida Khanum

== Special screening at Lok Virsa Museum ==
On 11 August 2018, this old classic Pakistani Punjabi film was selected to be screened by the Lok Virsa Museum management (Lok Virsa Film Club Mandwa).
