= Ahmad Rahi =

Pakistani poet and film songs writer

- Born: Ghulam Ahmad; 12 November 1923; Amritsar, Punjab, British India
- Died: 2 September 2002 (aged 78); Lahore, Punjab, Pakistan
- Occupations: Poet, writer, film screenwriter
- Years active: 1950 – 1980s
- Known for: Progressive Writers' Movement activist
- Awards: Pride of Performance Award by the President of Pakistan (1997); Adamjee Literary Award for his book 'Taranjan'

Ahmad Rahi (Note: Punjabi: احمد راہی) (12 November 1923 – 2 September 2002) was a Punjabi poet and writer from Pakistan.

== Early life ==
Ghulam Ahmad (professional name 'Ahmad Rahi') was born on 12 November 1923 in Amritsar, British India. His birth name was Ghulam Ahmad, a name given by his spiritual leader Khorsheed Ahmad. He completed his basic early education from Amritsar in 1940. After completing his high school, he got admission in M.A.O. College, Lahore but was expelled due to taking part in political movements. After expulsion, he joined his father in his business of selling embroidered wool shawls in the local market.

== Life and film career in Pakistan ==
After independence of Pakistan in 1947, he migrated to Pakistan and joined the magazine Sawera as an editor in Lahore at a monthly salary of Rupees 25. He wrote about the events and bloodshed leading up to the independence of Pakistan in 1947 which was a very painful personal experience for him due to the atrocities committed by Muslims, Sikhs and Hindus against each other. Religious biases and sectarian animosities flared up and were at their peak level during 1947. Deeply and personally affected by the events, he wrote two books on this subject. His first book Taranjan was published in 1952 and the second book was also published under the name of Nimi Nimi Hawa. Both books were in the Punjabi language. Taranjan was a poetry book about the bloodshed ahead of the independence of Pakistan in 1947.

== Progressive Writers' Movement activist ==
Ahmad Rahi, along with the renowned Pakistani film producer-director Saifuddin Saif, noted short story writer Saadat Hassan Manto and the now-celebrated Pakistani poet Faiz Ahmed Faiz started gathering socially at the historic Pak Tea House in Lahore, shortly after the independence of Pakistan in 1947. One of those Ahmad Rahi's old friends was Abdul Hameed (writer) (1928 – 29 April 2011) who had told a major Lahore newspaper in an interview before he died in 2011, "Literary giants like Sahir Ludhianvi, Munir Niazi, Ahmad Rahi, Ashfaq Ahmad, Ibn-e-Insha and Nasir Kazmi were among his closest friends. He had been a part of the historic years of 'Pak Tea House' crowd in Lahore, Pakistan. This historic tea house was and still is known as a gathering place for intellectuals, poets, writers and artists. "It holds a special place in the memories of those who know about Lahore's vibrant literary and cultural past." Pak Tea House, therefore, also became a central location for all these above intellectuals who were also active in the Progressive Writers' Movement in Pakistan.

Film songs written by him for films Heer Ranjha (1970), Mirza Jat (1967), Baji (1963) and Yakke Wali (1957) became run-away super-hits in Pakistan. He was a close friend of renowned Pakistani writer Saadat Hasan Manto and film producer and poet Saifuddin Saif, and all 3 friends played key roles in the early years of Pakistan film industry in Lahore. He wrote songs for a total of 51 films - 9 films in Urdu language and 42 movies in the Punjabi language.

== Death and legacy ==
Ahmad Rahi died on 2 September 2002 in Lahore, Pakistan at age 79. He had been paralyzed for almost seven months which had affected his speech and memory. He is survived by his wife, a son and a daughter.

On his death anniversary event in 2009, Punjab Institute of Language, Art and Culture (PILAC) Director-General said that Ahmad Rahi was an 'egoist' who never made compromises in his life.

== Awards and recognition ==
- Pride of Performance Award by the President of Pakistan in 1997.
- Adamjee Literary Award for literature for his book 'Taranjan' (book in Punjabi-language).

== Memorable super-hit film songs ==
Ahmad Rahi was a pioneer poet in the early days of Pakistan film industry. "It is said that he wrote over 1900 film songs for Urdu and Punjabi films."

- "Resham da laacha lakk wey, jatti challi morabbian di saer nuun" Sung by Zubaida Khanum and others, music by Ghulam Ahmed Chishti, film Yakke Wali (1957 film)
- "Kalli sawari bhae, bhaati lohari bhae", film Yakke Wali (1957)
- "Jatti challi morabbian di saer nuun", film Yakke Wali (1957)
- "Teray dar tey aake sajana wey", film Yakke Wali (1957)
- "Meri chunni diyan reshmi tandaan", film Jatti (1958), music by Ghulam Ahmed Chishti
- "Sunjay dil waale boohay, ajay mein nahion tohay", film Mirza Jat (1967), music by Rasheed Attre
- "Mutiaro ni meray haan dio" Sung by Noor Jehan, film Mirza Jat (1967), music by Rasheed Attre
- "Dil ke afsaane nigahon ki zaban tak pohanchay" film Baji (1963) soundtrack, sung by Noor Jehan, music by Saleem Iqbal
- "Chanda tori chaandani mein jia jala jaaey re" film Baji (1963) soundtrack, sung by Naseem Begum, music by Salim Iqbal
- "Burray naseeb meray wairi hoya pyaar mera" film Chhumantar (1958) soundtrack, sung by Zarif and Zubaida Khanum, music by Master Rafiq Ali
- "Aeni gull duss deio nikkay nikkay tario" film Chhumantar (1958) soundtrack, sung by Noor Jehan, music by Master Rafiq Ali.

Later in 1970, he wrote all the highly popular hit film songs of the Punjabi-language film Heer Ranjha (1970 film) with music by Khwaja Khurshid Anwar.
