= Pheray =

1949 Pakistani film

- Directed by: Nazir Ahmed Khan
- Produced by: Swaran Lata
- Starring: Swaran Lata; Nazir Ahmed Khan; M. Ismael; Nazar; Zeenat; Maya Devi; Baba Alam Siaposh; Allauddin
- Cinematography: Raza Mir
- Music by: Ghulam Ahmed Chishti
- Release date: 28 July 1949
- Country: Pakistan
- Language: Punjabi

Pheray is a 1949 Pakistani Punjabi-language film directed by Nazir Ahmed Khan. The story of the film was a remake of Nazir's own 1945 Indian film Gaon Ki Gori, that was released before partition. Ghulam Ahmed Chishti composed the music and the lyrics were written by G. A. Chishti and Baba Alam Siyahposh.

The singers were Munawar Sultana and Inayat Hussain Bhatti. The film was released on 28 July 1949.

Pheray was a big musical hit and became Pakistan's first 'Silver Jubilee' film. It was screened in Lahore for 25 weeks at Palace Cinema and in Karachi for 5 weeks at the Taj Mahal Cinema.

== Plot ==
Rani loves Jani, but her brother Raju opposes their union. Having borrowed money from Chaudhary Lachhu, a wealthy zamindar in a neighboring village, Raju hatches a plan to marry Rani to him in repayment. Lachhu had already fallen for Rani after seeing her at a fair, and Raju took advantage of this. During the wedding ceremony, Rani's best friend Lachhi stood in for her and took the seven steps around the fire, saat phere, completely veiled by her ghunghat, and no one noticed the switch. After the ceremony, Rani and Lachhi moved to Lachhu's house and take over their original positions. However, Rani feigns illness to avoid any intimate relations with him. Eventually, Lachhu gets tired of her tactics and discovered the truth behind her behavior. Feeling sympathetic towards the young lovers, he decided to rectify the situation and arranged for Rani to marry Jani instead.

== Cast ==
- Swaran Lata as Rani
- Nazir Ahmed Khan as Jani
- Muhammad Ismael as Chaudhary Lachhu
- Allauddin as Raju
- Nazar as Chhajju
- Zeenat Begum as Lachhi
- Baba Alam Siaposh
- Maya Devi
