= Heer (1955 film) =

1955 film

- Directed by: Nazir
- Screenplay by: Baba Alam Siyahposh
- Based on: Heer Ranjha by Waris Shah
- Produced by: J.C. Anand
- Starring: Swaran Lata; Inayat Hussain Bhatti; Rekha; Zeenat Begum; M. Ajmal; Nazar; Imdad Husain
- Music by: Safdar Hussain
- Distributed by: Eveready Pictures
- Release date: 28 October 1955
- Country: Pakistan
- Language: Punjabi

Heer (Punjabi: ھیر) is a 1955 Pakistani Punjabi-language film produced by J.C. Anand, directed by Nazir starring Swaran Lata and Inayat Hussain Bhatti in title roles. The film is based on the Punjabi folktale Heer Ranjha, by Waris Shah.

It tells the story of the love between Heer Sial and Dheedo Ranjha who are destined not to be together. Produced by J.C. Anand's Eveready Pictures, Heer was the first Punjabi film produced in Karachi.

== Cast ==
Actor/Actress	Roles
Swaran Lata	Heer
Inayat Hussain Bhatti	Ranjha
Rekha	Malki (Heer's mother)
M. Ajmal	Kaido (Heer's uncle)
Nazar	Saida Khera (Heer's husband)
Zeenat Begum	Sehti (Saida's sister)
Imdad Husain	Bhangi

== Music and soundtrack ==
The music is composed by Safdar Hussain with playback singers, Inayat Hussain Bhatti, Munawar Sultana, Imdad Husain and Zubaida Khanum.

- "Dhole Diley Da Jani Ajay Nahin Aaya" Sung by Zubaida Khanum, lyrics by Baba Alam Siyahposh and music of Safdar Hussain
- "Assaan Jaan Kay Meet Lai Akhh Wey" Sung by Zubaida Khanum, lyrics by Baba Alam Siyahposh
- "Hun Beerrian Nuun Kar Ley Bund Ni, Khulla Chhagga Paan Waliay" Sung by Inayat Hussain Bhatti and others, a Banghra song, lyrics by Hazin Qadri and music by Safdar Hussain
- "Sahnun Sajana Dey Milney Di Taang Aei" Sung by Inayat Hussain Bhatti, lyrics by Hazin Qadri
- "Akhhaan Millian Gulabi Nainaan Naal Ji" Sung by Zubaida Khanum, lyrics by Hazin Qadri, music by Safdar Hussain

== See also ==
- Heer Ranjha (1932 film)
- Heer Sial (1938 film)
- Heer Sial (1965 film)
