= Zafar Iqbal Zafri =

- Genres: playback singing
- Occupation: Singer

Zafar Iqbal Zafri is a Pakistani melody singer and a playback singer in Lollywood Pakistan.

== Album list ==
- Janejaan
- Bhool ja Mere Dil
- Mein To Har Mor Pe
- Aur Is Dil Mein
- Agar Bewafa Thujh Ko
- Piyar Ki Bhool
- Mere Dushman Tu Meri
- Dil Mein HO Tum
- Dooriyaan
- Dil kiya karey
- Dil Da Jani
- Chori Chori
- Dil Se Tera Nam Mit Jaye Dua Karna
- Sharabi Ghazlen
- Mere Mehboob Qayamat Hogi
