= Sultana Daku (1975 film) =

1975 film

- Directed by: Muzaffar Tahir
- Written by: Riaz Arshad
- Based on: English reign true events (1920)
- Produced by: Riaz Choudhry
- Starring: Sudhir; Neelo; Nazli; Munawar Saeed; Ali Ejaz; Veena; Najma Mehboob; Ashraf Khan; Jaggi Malik; Seema; Munir Zarif; Adeeb; Rehan; Alauddin; Master Muad
- Cinematography: Waqar Hussain
- Edited by: Iqbal Malik
- Music by: G.A. Chishti; Lyrics; Waris Ludhyanvi; Habib Jalib; Hassan Nisar; Singers; Noor Jehan
- Production companies: Oriental Films; Evernew Studio
- Release date: 12 December 1975 (Pakistan)
- Running time: 148 minutes
- Country: Pakistan
- Language: Punjabi

Sultana Daku (سلطانہ ڈاکو Pakistani, Punjabi) is a 1975 film that was released on 12 December, 1975.

== Cast ==
- Sudhir as Sultana Daku, the film's title role
- Neelo as (Reshma)
- Nazli as (Reetha)
- Munawar Saeed as (Ramoo)
- Veena as (Gulabo)
- Ali Ejaz as (Karmu)
- Najma Mehboob as (Mother's of Sultana)
- Ashraf Khan as (Thanedar)
- Jaggi Malik as (Gopal Singh)
- Seema as (Prinder Kaur)
- Munir Zarif as (Comedy)
- Nouroz as (Thakkar's Child)
- Rehana Babri as (Supporting actress)
- Banka as (Thakkar Bansi)
- Meena Daud as (Nayika)
- Taya Barkat as (Sardar)
- Master Murad as (Sheeda)
- Adeeb as (Farangi)
- Rehan as (Farangi)
- Alauddin as (Thakkar)

== Track listing ==
No.	Title	Artist(s)	Length
1.	"Meinu Chheir Chheir Langdi Hawa.."	Noor Jehan	4:23
2.	"Way Kurri Main Badam Wargi, Meinu Akh Day Isharay Naal Bhann Lay.."	Noor Jehan	3:45
3.	"Nein Main Teray Kol Behna, Tu Tay Sharab Pi.."	Noor Jehan	3:33
4.	"Mera Pyar, Mera Pyar Aa Geya, Ajj Di Raat A Bhagan Wali.."	Noor Jehan	5:10
5.	"Ratan Nay Banaya Sanu, Anherian Nay Paliya.."	Noor Jehan	4:37
6.	"Main Tay Rakh Leye Naag Saperay.."	Noor Jehan	3:22

All film musical score was by G.A. Chishti and film song lyrics were by Waris Ludhianvi, Habib Jalib and Hassan Nisar.
