= Noor-e-Islam =

1957 film

Noor-e-Islam (1957 film)
- Directed by: Nazir
- Written by: Arsh Lakhnavi
- Produced by: J.C. Anand
- Starring: Darpan; Swaran Lata; Nazir; Naeem Hashmi; Asha Posley; Nazar
- Music by: Hassan Latif
- Production company: Eveready Pictures
- Release date: 1 November 1957
- Country: Pakistan
- Language: Urdu

Noor-e-Islam is a 1957 Pakistani costume drama film directed by Nazir and produced by J.C. Anand under banner Eveready Pictures.

The film tells the story on the style of Arabian Nights, and revolves around the conflict between Muslims and Mongols. The film features the popular Naʽat Shah-e-Madina, Yasrab Ke Wali by Irene Perveen and Saleem Raza.

It was Perveen's first film for which she lent her voice.

== Cast ==
- Swaran Lata
- Darpan
- Nazir
- Asha Posley
- Naeem Hashmi
- Nazar
- Majeed

== Soundtrack ==
Noor-e-Islam became popular due to its Naʽat Shah-e-Madina, Yasrab Ke Wali which was performed by Irene Perveen and Saleem Raza with chorus. The Naʽat was written by Naeem Hashmi while the rest of the lyrics were penned by Tanvir Naqvi. Hassan Latif was the music composer for the film's soundtrack.

=== Track listing ===
- Dil Kisi Ko Dijiye Sung by Zubaida Khanum
- Meri Nigahon Ne Chooma Sung by Zubaida Khanum
- Palken To Utha, Nazren To Mila Sung by Zubaida Khanum and Fazal Hussain
- Ya Rab Tere Bandey Jaye Kahan by Zubaida Khanum
