= Dulla Bhatti (1956 film) =

Pakistani Punjabi-language film (1956)

- Directed by: M. S. Dar
- Produced by: Agha G. A. Gul
- Starring: Sabiha Khanum; Sudhir; Asha Posley; Akmal; Allauddin; Rakhshi
- Music by: G.A. Chishti
- Release date: 1956
- Country: Pakistan
- Language: Punjabi

Dulla Bhatti is a 1956 Pakistani Punjabi-language film based on the life story of Dulla Bhatti, a historical folk hero of Punjab, Mughal Empire who lived during the ruling period of Mughal Emperor Akbar.

This film was produced by the veteran film producer Agha G. A. Gul and directed by M. S. Dar.

== Cast ==
- Sabiha Khanum
- Sudhir (as Dulla Bhatti)
- Asha Posley
- M. Ismail
- Ghulam Mohammad
- Rakhshi
- Akmal
- Allauddin

== Popular songs ==
Music was composed by G.A. Chishti, film song lyrics by Tufail Hoshiarpuri. Playback singers were Inayat Hussain Bhatti, Munawar Sultana and Kausar Parveen.

Song title	Sung by	Lyrics by	Music by	Film notes
Wasta ee Rabb da tu jaeen wey kabutra, Chthhi meray dhol nu puhnchain wey kabutra	Munawar Sultana	Tufail Hoshiarpuri	G.A. Chishti	This song became a runaway hit upon the film's release in 1956
