= Chhoti Begum (1956 film) =

1956 film

- Directed by: Ataullah Hashmi
- Screenplay by: Shatir Ghaznavi
- Produced by: Malik Mehboob Ahmad
- Starring: Sudhir; Sabiha Khanum; Asha Posley; Naeem Hashmi; Diljeet Mirza
- Music by: Tassaduq Hussain
- Release date: 10 May 1956
- Country: Pakistan
- Language: Urdu

Chhoti Begum is a 1956 Urdu-language Pakistani film directed by Ataullah Hashmi with music and songs by Tassaduq Hussain.

== Cast ==
- Sabiha Khanum
- Sudhir
- Zareef
- Asha Posley
- Diljeet Mirza
- Naeem Hashmi
- Shola
- Nadira

== Popular film songs ==
It was a debut film for music director Tassaduq Hussain, film song lyrics were by Qateel Shifai and Hazin Qadri.
