= J.C. Anand =

Pakistani film producer

- Born: Jagdish Chand Anand; 1922; Bhera, Sargodha, Punjab. (British India)
- Died: 17 May 1977 (aged 54–55); Karachi, Sindh, Pakistan
- Occupation: film producer
- Years active: 1947 – 1977
- Relatives: Satish Anand (son); Juhi Chawla (niece)

Jagdish Chand Anand better known as J.C. Anand (1922 – 17 May 1977) was a Pakistani film producer and distributor. One of the largest distributors within the country, he founded Eveready Pictures in Karachi.

== Family background ==
Anand was born in 1922 in Bhera, Sargodha District, British India. His father was a businessman. His family opted to stay back in Pakistan at the time of Partition in 1947. Anand was the Maternal uncle of Indian actress Juhi Chawla, who is his sister's daughter.

His son, Satish Chand Anand, after graduating from London School of Economics in 1971 continues to make films in Pakistan under their home banner Eveready Pictures. Satish Chand has 3 daughters. The middle daughter is in medical profession. His eldest daughter Tania is based in UK and the youngest Neha based in Dubai, both are in infotainment business.

== Career ==
Soon after independence in 1947, Anand founded Eveready Pictures to produce and distribute films. Pakistan's pioneer film producer Agha G. A. Gul was his colleague and a friend. Film producer J. C. Anand played a key role in inviting Indian film maker Roop K. Shorey and his then popular actress wife Meena Shorey to Pakistan to make Miss 56 (1956). Meena Shorey was born in Raiwind, Punjab near Lahore and had become famously known as the Larra Lappa girl after the success of Indian film Ek Thi Ladki (1949).

== Death ==
J.C. Anand died on 17 May 1977 in Karachi, Pakistan.

== Films ==
- Sassi (1954) (first golden jubilee film of Pakistan)
- Heer (1955) (with highly popular music and film songs by music director Safdar Hussain)
- Miss 56 (1956)
- Ishq-e-Laila (1957)
- Murad (1957)
- Noor-e-Islam (1957) (with super-hit Naat song Shah-e-Madina Yasrab Ke Waali)
- Hasrat (1958)
- Alam Ara (1959)
- Dulhan (1963)
