= Safdar Hussain =

Pakistani music director

- Died: 24 March 1989 Lahore
- Genres: Film score
- Occupation: Music director of films
- Years active: 1955 – 1987

Safdar Hussain (died 1989) was a Pakistani musician who composed playback melodies for Urdu and Punjabi Lollywood films from the 1950s to the 1980s.

He is known for composing music for movies like Heer (1955), Ishq-e-Laila (1957), and Nooran (1957). Some of his notable compositions include "Assan Jan Kay Meet Lei Akh Way, Jhooti Mooti Da Pa Leyaey Kakh Way" (Singer: Zubaida Khanum), "Laila O Laila, Shehar Khoobaan Laila" (Singer: Zubaida Khanum), "Wekhya Howay Ni Kisay Takya Howay, Ucha Jeya Shamla" (Singer: Noor Jehan), and others.

== Career ==
Safdar's debut movie as a music director was Heer. It was directed by Nazir and released in 1955. Safdar was introduced to the filmmaker by the musician Rashid Attre who was also his uncle. The tracks of the film were hits and helped launch Safdar's music career in Lollywood. In 1957, he composed music for the film Ishq-e-Laila, which is considered the biggest ever musical movie in the history of Pakistani cinema. The film included record fourteen songs and almost all of them became classics. Another milestone in Safdar's career was a Punjabi movie, Nooran (1957). Most of its songs were vocalized by Noor Jehan and became popular at the time.

As a music director, Safdar composed music for 76 Urdu and Punjabi movies. His last movie, Meri Awaz, was released in 1987.

== Popular compositions ==
- 1955 (Film: Heer - Punjabi) ... Sanu Sajna Day Milnay Di Tang A, Seenay Wich Wajji Ishqay Di Taang, Singer(s): Inayat Hussain Bhatti, Poet: Hazeen Qadri
- 1955 (Film: Heer - Punjabi) ... Assan Jan Kay Meet Lei Akh Way, Jhooti Mooti Da Pa Leya Kakh Way, Singer(s): Zubaida Khanum, Poet: Hazin Qadri
- 1955 (Film: Heer - Punjabi) ... Baddal Nu Hath Lawan Tay Uddi Uddi Jawan Hawa Day Naal, Singer(s): Munawar Sultana & others, Poet: Hazin Qadri
- 1955 (Film: Heer - Punjabi) ... Dhol Dillay Da Jani Ajjay Nein Aya, Day Kay Dard Nishani, Singer(s): Zubaida Khanum, Poet: Hazin Qadri
- 1957 (Film: Ishq-e-Laila - Urdu) ... Mohabbat Ka Janaza Ja Raha Hay, Singer(s): Inayat Hussain Bhatti, Poet: Qateel Shifai
- 1957 (Film: Ishq-e-Laila - Urdu) ... Sitaro Tum Tau So Jao, Pareshan Raat Sari Hay, Singer(s): Iqbal Bano, Music: Safdar Hussain, Poet: Qateel Shafai
- 1957 (Film: Nooran - Punjabi)...Panchhi Te Pardesi Aake Turr Jawndey, Singers: Noor Jehan, Munir Hussain, Poet: Hazin Qadri
- 1959 (Film: Naaji - Punjabi) ... Mera Jeeway Dhola, Singer: Zubaida Khanum, Poet: Baba Alam Siyahposh
- 1959 (Film: Nagin - Urdu) ... Sayyan Ji Ko Dhoondnay Chali, Phirroon Mein Gali Gali Jogan Ban Ke, Singer: Naheed Niazi, Poet: Qateel Shifai
- 1959 (Film: Nagin - Urdu) ... Ambwa Ki Daarion Pe Jhoolna Jhulai Ja, Abb Ke Sawan Ghar Aai Ja, Singer: Iqbal Bano, Poet: Qateel Shifai
- 1967 (Film: Shab Bakhair - Urdu) ... Teray Gham Say Mohabbat Ho Gayi Hay, Sittam Sehnay Ki Aadat Ho Gai Hai, Singer(s): Mala Begum, Poet: Fayyaz Hashmi
- 1967 (FIlm: Shab Bakhair - Urdu) ... Hamein Koi Gham Nahin Tha, Gham-e-Ashiqi Se Pehlay, Singer: Mehdi Hassan, Poet Fayyaz Hashmi
- 1969 (Film: Dulla Haidari - Punjabi) ... Bazi Jitt Leyi O Jind Pyar Day Naven La Kay, Singer(s): Noor Jehan, Poet: Khawaja Pervaiz
- 1972 (Film: Thah - Punjabi) ... Pehli Wari Ajj Unhan Akhian Nay Takiya Eiho Jeya Takya, Singer(s): Ghulam Ali, Poet: Waris Ludhyanvi
- 1972 (Film: Thah - Punjabi) ... Teray Milan Nu Ayi Barhay Chah Kar Kay, Aa Seenay Naal Lagg Ja Thah Kar Kay, Singer(s): Noor Jehan, Poet: Waris Ludhyanvi
- 1974 (Film: Khatarnak - Punjabi) ... Teray Sadqay Way Dildara, Ajj Mukkian Ne Tangan Pyar Dian, Singer(s): Noor Jahan, Poet: Khawaja Parvaiz
- 1976 (Film: Wardat - Punjabi) ... Koi Kar Kay Bahana Sanu Mill Mahi Way, Raatan Aa Geyan Chananiyan, Singer(s): Mala, Poet: Qateel Shifai
- 1978 (Film: Ghunda - Punjabi) ... Hor Sunao Sajna Ki Haal Chaal Ay, Singer(s): Masood Rana, Poet: Khawaja Pervaiz

== Death ==
Safdar Hussain died on 24 March 1989, in Lahore, Pakistan.
