= Paraye Bas Mein =

- Directed by: Daud Chand
- Starring: Asha Posley; Zubeida Begum; Pran; Zubeida
- Release date: 1946
- Country: India
- Language: Hindi

Paraye Bas Mein is a Bollywood film. It was released in 1946.

== Cast ==
- Asha Posley
- Zubeida Begum
- Pran
- Zubeida
- Nazar
- Zahoor Shah
- Ramlal
