= Aai Bahar =

1946 film

- Directed by: Shankar Mehta
- Starring: Asha Posley; Om Prakash; Noor Mohammed Charlie
- Cinematography: D. N. Madhok
- Music by: Pandit Amarnath; Anupam Ghatak
- Release date: 1946
- Country: India
- Language: Hindi

Aai Bahar (lit. 'Spring Comes') is a Bollywood film. It was released in 1946.

== Cast ==
- Asha Posley
- Om Prakash
- Noor Mohammed Charlie
- Irshad
- Ramesh
- Ajmal
