= Intezar (1956 film) =

1956 film

Intezar (1956)
- Directed by: Masood Parvez
- Written by: Syed Imtiaz Ali Taj (dialogues)
- Screenplay by: Khwaja Khurshid Anwar
- Produced by: Sultan Jilani; Khwaja Khurshid Anwar
- Starring: Noor Jehan; Santosh Kumar; Asha Posley; Rakhshi
- Cinematography: Nabi Ahmed
- Music by: Khwaja Khurshid Anwar
- Production company: Select Pictures
- Release date: 12 May 1956 (Pakistan)
- Country: Pakistan
- Language: Urdu

Intezar (Urdu: انتظار, lit. 'Wait') is a Pakistani musical romance film directed by Masood Parvez.

It was co-produced by Khwaja Khurshid Anwar who also composed the music for the film. Noor Jehan and Santosh Kumar played the leading roles in the film with Kumar appearing in the dual role in this film. The film revolves around a blind girl from the mountains who waits for her childhood love interest who lives in the city.

A musical blockbuster of its time, the film is considered as one of the best musical films of Lollywood of all times with songs by Noor Jehan, Kausar Parveen and Iqbal Bano and lyrics by Qateel Shifai. The songs of the film "Chand Hsaey Dunya Basey", "Jis Din Se Piya Dil Le Gye", "Aa Bhi Ja" and "O Janey Waley" became memorable.

== Plot ==
Nimmi, a blind girl with a melodious voice lives in a hilly village. She awaits for her childhood friend, Saleem who used to live here fifteen years ago in their childhood. However, they couldn't keep in touch as Slaeem's mother doesn't like her son's friendship with a singer's daughter. Years after when his mother dies, he goes to the mountains to meet Nimmi but there he meets Chhemo, Nimmi's cousin. On the advice of Lachoo, Chhemo deceives Saleem and introduces herself as Nimmi to him, so that she can get her wealth. On the other hand, Nimmi feels that something is wrong as she finds that Saleem is near to her.

Things take a turn for all of them when a theatre manager offers a job to both Nimmi and Chhemo in his theater in Karachi. The time finally arrives when Nimmi discovers about Saleem and has yet to meet him but he gets prey of Lachoo's attack who injures his leg and throws him from the bridge. Nimmi then goes to Karachi where she sings the songs in the theater. The theatre actually belonged to Saleem's twin brother Naeem who falls in love with her.

== Cast ==
- Noor Jehan as Nimmi
- Santosh Kumar as twin brothers Saleem and Naeem (dual role)
- Asha Posley as Chhemo
- Majeed
- Rani Kiran
- Rakhshi
- Ghulam Mohammed

== Soundtrack ==
All lyrics are written by Qateel Shifai; all music is composed by Khwaja Khurshid Anwar

Intezaar
No.	Title	Singer (s)	Length
1.	"Aa Gaye, Balam Pardesi, Sajjan Pardesi "	Noor Jehan
2.	"Aankh Se Aankh Mila Le"	Noor Jehan, Iqbal Bano
3.	"Chand Hasay, Dunya Basay "	Noor Jehan
4.	"Gazab Kiya Yere Waday Pe Aitebaar Kiya "	Noor Jehan
5.	"Chhunn Chhunn Nachu Gi, Gunn Gaun Gi "	Noor Jehan
6.	"Sanwan Ki Ghangor Ghattao "	Noor Jehan
7.	"Jawani Ki Raatain, Jawani Ke Din"	Kausar Parveen & co.
8.	"O Janey Waley Rey, Thehro Zra Ruk Jao "	Noor Jehan
9.	"O Chanda Ja Badli Mein Chhup Ja"	Kausar Parveen
10.	"Jis Din Se Piya Dil Le Gye "	Noor Jehan

== Release ==
The film was released on 12 May 1956. It also had a theatrical release in India.

== Reception ==
Mushtaq Gazdar, a well-known film critic, in his book "Pakistan Cinema 1947 - 1997" termed some of the songs of the film as 'immortal masterpieces of classic film music'.

Lata Mangeshkar termed the music of the film as one of her favourite Pakistani music score.
