= Sadqay Teri Mout Tun =

- Sadkey Teri Maut Ton
- Directed by: Inayat Hussain Bhatti
- Written by: Qaisar Malik
- Produced by: Nadeem Abbas; Mian Farzand Ali
- Starring: Kaifee; Inayat Hussain Bhatti; Neelo; Sultan Rahi; Najma; Bahar Begum; Khalid Saleem Mota; Deeba; Sawan
- Cinematography: M. Latif
- Music by: Bakhshi Wazir
- Distributed by: Bhatti films
- Release date: 28 July 1977 (Pakistan)
- Running time: 160 (minutes)
- Country: Pakistan
- Language: Punjabi

Sadqay Teri Mout Tun (صدقے تیری موت توں) is a 1977 Pakistani Punjabi-language action film.

It is directed by Inayat Hussain Bhatti, produced by Nadeem Abbas, starring Inayat Hussain Bhatti, Neelo, Kaifee and Sultan Rahi

== Cast ==
- Inayat Hussain Bhatti
- Sultan Rahi
- Neelo
- Kaifee
- Najma
- Deeba
- Jaggi
- Munawar Saeed
- Khalid Saleem Mota
- Bahar
- Sawan
- Imrozia
- Altaf Khan

== Track list ==
The soundtrack was composed by the musician Bakhshi Wazir, with lyrics by Waris Ludhyanvi and sung by Mehnaz, Inayat Hussain Bhatti.

#	Title	Singer(s)
1	"Ho ji ho, Dunya walo, Rabb nay sarey"	Inayat Hussain Bhatti
2	"Zalim kehnday Daku meinu"	Inayat Hussain Bhatti
