= Guddi Gudda =

1956 film

- Directed by: Wali Sahib
- Starring: Musarrat Nazir; Sudhir; Asha Posley; Agha Talish
- Music by: Ghulam Ahmed Chishti
- Release date: 1956
- Country: Pakistan
- Language: Punjabi

Guddi Gudda was a 1956 Pakistani Punjabi-language film directed by Wali Sahib.

== Cast ==
- Musarrat Nazir
- Sudhir
- Asha Posley
- Agha Talish
- M. Ajmal
- Zubaida Khanum
- Ghulam Mohammad

== Music ==
The film's music was by Ghulam Ahmed Chishti, popularly known as Baba G.A. Chisti, song lyrics were written by Wali Sahib. Playback singers for the film were Munawar Sultana, Zubaida Khanum and Abdul Shakoor Bedil.

=== Tracks ===
Song title	Sung by	Lyrics by	Music by	Film notes
Babul Da Wehra Chhad Ke, Hoke Majboor Challi, Guddian Patole Chhad Ke, Veeran Taun Dur Challi	Zubaida Khanum	Wali Sahib	G.A. Chishti	Guddi Gudda was an 'average film' at the box office but its songs and music became popular in 1956
Naieen Reesaan Shehar Lahore Diyan, Sun Sajna Gallan Ghor Diyan	Zubaida Khanum, Munawar Sultana and Abdul Shakoor Bedil	Wali Sahib	G.A. Chishti	
Sahdi Gali Wichhun Chori Chori Lang Mahiya, Haaye Wey Teray Laarian Ne Keeta Sahnu Tang Mahiya	Zubaida Khanum	Nazim Panipati	G.A. Chishti	
Wey Rab Teri Khair Kare, Teinun Laggan Na Tattian Hawaawan	Munawar Sultana	Wali Sahib	G.A. Chishti	
