= M. Ajmal =

Pakistani film actor

Ajmal Khan
- Born: Mohammad Ajmal Qadri; 17 May 1910; Kolkata, British India
- Died: 19 June 1988 (aged 78); Lahore, Punjab, Pakistan
- Other names: Ajmal, Ajmal Khan
- Occupation: Actor
- Years active: 1937–1988
- Relatives: actor Akmal (brother)
- Awards: Nigar Award in 1970

Mohammad Ajmal Qadri (popularly known as Ajmal) (17 May 1910 – 19 June 1988) was a Pakistani actor, best known for his role as Kaido in the classic Pakistani Punjabi film Heer Ranjha.

This film had super-hit music by music director Khwaja Khurshid Anwar and song lyrics by Ahmad Rahi. Qadri played the same role in the previously made film Heer (1955) which was directed by the veteran film director Nazir Ahmed Khan.

== Early life and career ==
Ajmal was born on 17 May 1910 and started acting in 1930s. He was praised for his massive screen presence, sharp expressions, and a powerful baritone voice that made him fit for heavy supporting and villainous roles. Over a career spanning five decades (1937–1988), he appeared in 212 films, including 135 Punjabi and 77 Urdu productions.

He entered the film industry before the creation of Pakistan, debuting in the pre-partition Punjabi film Sohni Mahiwal (1937), shot in Lahore. After the partition of British India, he resumed his acting career in Pakistan with the Urdu movie Hichkolay (1949). Ajmal was mostly seen in supporting roles in Pakistani movies. He was the elder brother of Punjabi films lead actor Akmal.

== Death ==
Ajmal died on 19 June 1988 in Lahore and was laid to rest at Garden Town Graveyard (Cemetery), Lahore.

== Selected filmography ==
He started as a villain actor and appeared in many movies like:

- Yamla Jat (1940)
- Khazanchi (1941 film)
- Khandan (1942 film)
- Zamindar (1942)
- Hichkolay (1949) his debut film in Pakistan
- Heer (1955 film)
- Guddi Guddi (1956)
- Baghi (1956)
- Yakke Wali (1957)
- Ishq-e-Laila (1957)
- Nooran (1957)
- Jatti (1958)
- Kartar Singh (1959)
- Sohni Kumharan (1960)
- Tees Mar Khan (1963)
- Malangi (1965)
- Phannay Khan (1965)
- Imam Din Gohavia (1967)
- Heer Ranjha (1970)
- Khan Chacha (1972)
- Athra Puttar (1981)
- Moti Tay Dogar (1983)
- Babul (1990)

== Awards ==
- Special Nigar Award for film Heer Ranjha (1970 film)

== See also ==
- Akmal Khan (his younger brother)
