= Nooran (film) =

1957 film

- Directed by: M. A. Khan
- Produced by: J.C. Anand
- Starring: Sudhir; Noor Jehan; Saeed Khan Rangeela; Agha Salim Raza; Maya Devi; Zeenat; Nazar; Nighat Sultana; Ajmal; Rakhshi
- Music by: Safdar Hussain
- Production company: Eveready Pictures
- Release date: May 30, 1957
- Country: Pakistan
- Language: Punjabi

Nooran (Punjabi: نوراں), also spelled Nooraan, is a 1957 Pakistani Punjabi-language musical romance film directed by M. A. Khan and starring Noor Jehan and Sudhir in lead roles. Hazeen Qadri wrote the film, songs lyrics and dialogues of the film. Although, the film didn't do well at box office but over the years, the film's song became popular and inspired the others, especially that sung by Jehan.

== Cast ==
- Noor Jahan
- Sudhir
- Zeenat
- Nazar
- Saleem Raza
- M. Ajmal
- Kamla
- G.N. Butt
- Rakhshi
- Maya Devi
- Ismael Qamar
- Rangeela
- Afzal Beg
- Saeed Akhtar
- Nighat Sultana (guest appearance)

== Production ==
The film was made in Lahore by Ever-ready Pictures. It was produced by J.C Anand, directed by M.A Khan, story/lyrics by Hazin Qadri, and music composed by Safdar Hussain.

== Music ==
Safdar Hussain composed the music, and playback singers were Noor Jehan, Iqbal Bano and Munir Hussain

Track list:

- "Tere Bol Ney, Tey Merian Ney Bullian"
- "Wekhia Hovey Ni Kise Takkia Howey"
- "Panchhi Te Pardesi Aake Turr Jaanday"
- "Phirni Aan Main Labhdi"
- "Daachi Walia Lai Chall Naal Vey"
- "Ik Cheez Gwachi Dil Kolon"
- "Ik Pardesi, Ik Mutiar"
- "Tere Ishq Nachaya Karke Thaiia-Thaiia"
- "Kadi Aa Ve Dilbara Waasta Ee"
