= Miss 56 =

1956 Indian film

- Directed by: Roop K. Shorey
- Written by: I. S. Johar
- Produced by: J. C. Anand
- Starring: Meena Shorey; Santosh
- Music by: Ghulam Ahmed Chishti
- Release date: 1956
- Country: Pakistan

Miss 56 is a 1956 Pakistani comedy film produced by J. C. Anand. It was directed by Roop K. Shorey and written by I. S. Johar, while Ghulam Ahmed Chishti composed the music.

According to film historian Mushtaq Gazdar, the film was inspired by the Indian comedy Mr. & Mrs. '55 (1955). Starring Meena Shorey in the title role, Miss 56 centred on its heroine and was built around Meena's comedic talents.

Miss 56 marked the final collaboration between Roop K. Shorey and Meena. The film received mixed reviews from critics but performed well at the box office.

== Cast ==
- Meena Shorey
- Santosh
- Shamim Ara
- Charlie
- Zarif
- Aslam Pervaiz

== Production ==
Karachi-based producer J. C. Anand invited Indian filmmaker Roop K. Shorey and his actress-wife Meena to Pakistan in 1956 to make Miss 56. According to author Salma Siddique, the production coincided with restrictions on the exhibition of Indian films in Pakistan, which made working in the Pakistani film industry financially attractive for Meena. During the film's production, Meena travelled frequently between Karachi, Lahore, and Bombay.

After completing the film, Meena chose to settle permanently in Pakistan, while Roop K. Shorey returned to India. Miss 56 was the couple's final collaboration and marked the end of their marriage.

== Reception ==
Miss 56 received a mixed critical response, with one contemporary reviewer describing it as "surprisingly light-hearted" for the work of a veteran director. A review published in The Pakistan Times praised Meena as highly expressive, but added that her performance "lacks restraint" and that "the audience wishes there was someone to check her a bit".

The film performed well at the box office.
