= Kartar Singh (film) =

1959 film

- Poster
- Urdu: کرتار سنگھ
- Directed by: Saifuddin Saif
- Screenplay by: Saifuddin Saif
- Produced by: Saifuddin Saif
- Starring: Allauddin; Musarrat Nazir; Sudhir
- Cinematography: Naseem Hussain
- Music by: Saleem Iqbal
- Production company: G.A. Films
- Distributed by: G.A. Films
- Release date: 18 June 1959
- Country: Pakistan
- Language: Punjabi

Kartar Singh is a 1959 Pakistani Punjabi-language film about the partition of India in 1947 and the widespread violence that accompanied it.

It describes the conflicts between Hindus, Muslims and the Sikhs. This film is said to be based on real-life events in 1947. The title role is about an antagonist Kartar Singh who is a petty criminal and a trouble-maker, played by Allauddin who became very well-known after it, and often remembered as Kartar Singh. On seeing this film in Indian Punjab theater screens, it is said that Sikhs failed to recognize him as a Muslim, as he is not a Sikh in real life.

Kartar Singh is considered to be one of the blockbuster Punjabi films in Pakistan and ranks highly in the history of Punjabi cinema.

This film was also shown for three years in East Punjab, India.

== Crew's Background ==
The director and producer of this film Saifuddin Saif had migrated to Pakistan after directly experiencing tragic events of Partition of India in 1947. He was a respected leftist intellectual of Pakistan who was also a member of many progressive movements in Pakistan in the 1950s. Saifuddin Saif was born in Amritsar, British India in 1922 and died on 12 July 1993 at Lahore, Pakistan at age 71.

== Plot summary ==
This film is set in a village in Punjab, India where Hindus, Muslims and Sikhs are shown to be living peacefully before 1947. Vaid Prem Nath, a Hindu, is well respected in the village. Umer Din, a Muslim, is a World War II veteran who has fought in Burma and lives in the village. Kartar Singh, a Sikh, is the main villain who is a petty criminal and a trouble-maker in the village. When India is partitioned, the Muslims of the village including Umer Din and his love interest Laila want to migrate to Pakistan. As they are leaving, there is hostility and violence everywhere in the village. During this time, Umer Din's sister is abducted by the Sikhs but she is protected by an elderly Sikh who gives her shelter and looks after her. When his son tries to force himself on her, the old man kills him. The old man sends Umer Din a letter that his sister is safe and unviolated and sends her safely back to Pakistan. Kartar Singh, on one of his raids into Pakistan, has a scuffle with Umer Din, who works with the Pakistan Border Police, at the border. Umer Din shoots him but just wounds him and lets him escape back to India. His life saved, Kartar Singh has a change of heart. In order to redeem himself, he takes Umer Din's younger brother, sheltered by Vaid Prem Nath, back to him in Pakistan. But Kartar Singh himself is killed at the border as Umer Din suspects he has come on one of his raids again and shoots him dead.

== Cast ==
- Allauddin as Kartar Singh
- Zarif as Vaid Prem Nath, a local Hindu Hakim
- Sudhir as Umer Din, a veteran soldier of World War II
- Musarrat Nazir as love interest of Umer Din
- Laila as sister of Umer Din
- Bahar Begum as friend of love interest of Umer Din
- Fazal Haq as village shop-keeper
- Inayat Hussain Bhatti as village street singer
- M. Ajmal as Jarnail Sehan Singh

== Release ==
The film was released on 18 June 1959 on the Eid-ul-Azha day in Pakistan.

== Music and Songs ==
The music of the film was composed by Salim Iqbal. The lyrics were written by Amrita Pritam, Waris Ludhianvi and Saifuddin Saif himself, the producer and director of the film. The playback singers included Zubaida Khanum, Inayat Hussain Bhatti, Saleem Raza and Naseem Begum and Sain Akhtar.

- "Ajj Aakhaan Waris Shah Nu" – Sung by Zubaida Khanum, Inayat Hussain Bhatti, lyrics by Amrita Pritam
- "Ajj Mukk Gayee Ae Gaman Wali Shaam, Tainu Sahda Pehla Salaam" – Sung by Saleem Raza, Inayat Hussain Bhatti, lyrics by Saifuddin Saif
- "Gori Gori Chandni di Thandi Thandi Chhan Ni" – Sung by Zubaida Khanum, lyrics of all other film songs are by Waris Ludhianvi.
- "Rab Ik Bujharat" – Sung by Saleem Raza, lyrics by the Sufi poet Waris Shah
- "Baarin Barsi Khattan Gaya Si" – Sung by Sain Akhtar and chorus — a Banghra song
- "Mahi Ne Tainu Le Jaana Ni Goriye" – Sung by Zubaida Khanum, Naseem Begum
- "Desan Da Raja Meray Babul Da Pyaara" – Sung by Naseem Begum, Zubaida Khanum and others

== Reviews and response ==
=== In Pakistan ===
This film is considered to be as one of the greatest Punjabi films of Pakistan. Highest-grossing film of its time and one of the highest-grossing film of Pakistani film industry. Film crew included most popular talent of the Pakistani film industry. Sudhir, was a top hero of Pakistani films for four decades. Musarrat Nazir later known for her rendering and popularisation of Punjabi folk songs like Mera Laung Gawacha and Lathhe Di Chaadar. She was a popular lead actress of Punjabi films in the 1950s and 1960s. Ajmal was also a great Pakistani performer. Actress Bahar Begum was in a supporting role of a mother. She became popular for supporting roles like mother of Sultan Rahi in most of the Punjabi films of 1980s. Laila became well known for one of the popular wedding songs of the film. She was given lead roles in films after the popularity of her wedding song in this film and Zarif who had a role of a Hindu, was a great comedian of Pakistan film industry. He was the elder brother of famous comedian Munawar Zarif. Fazl Haq and Ghulam Mohammed were senior actors and were included in most of the films of that time. Playback singer Inayat Hussain Bhatti also performed in this film. He was known as a film hero only for some films but as a playback singer for many. The iconic actor of Pakistani cinema Allauddin was given the film's title role. His Punjabi dialogue spoken by the Sikhs became very popular. Film song Ajj aakhaan Waris Shah nu was a poem written by Amrita Pritam in reaction to Partition of India after her first-hand experience of the tragic events. She was loved on both sides of the border. As a token of respect and love, the Punjabi poets of Pakistan from the Punjab Academy, Pakistan sent her chaddars (green silk sheets edged with gold) from the tombs of Waris Shah and fellow Sufi mystic poets Bulle Shah and Sultan Bahu. This touched her the most and Amrita Pritam had her picture taken with these chaddars.

In 2015, Kartar Singh (1959 film) was screened by the Mandwa Film Club at the National Institute of Folk and Traditional Heritage (Lok Virsa Museum) in Islamabad, Pakistan. "It was the third film featured by the film club as part of an ongoing series."

=== In India ===
It is reportedly said that this film was shown for three years in Punjab, India. A major Indian movie website 'upperstall.com' gives a detailed review of this film and comments, "The film manages to bring out the horrors of partition, of how man debased himself totally and the absolute, senseless violence he unleashed on a fellow human being in the name of religion. In fact, what strikes one as a pleasant surprise about Kartar Singh, actually is the restraint in the story in terms of dealing with the various communities and bringing forth the message of humanity."
