= Saleem Raza (singer) =

Pakistani film playback singer

- سلِیم رضا
- Born: Noel Dias; 4 March 1932; Amritsar, British India
- Died: 25 November 1983 (aged 51); Vancouver, British Columbia, Canada
- Occupation: Film playback singer
- Years active: 1955 – 1983
- Awards: Nigar Awards in 1960 and 1963

Noel Dias (4 March 1932 – 25 November 1983), better known as Saleem Raza (Urdu: سلِیم رضا), was a Pakistani playback singer. Born in a Christian family, he converted to Islam later. Raza started his singing career from Lahore, Pakistan, quickly gaining popularity. A classically trained vocalist, he was particularly acclaimed for his soulful, melancholic songs. Raza enjoyed prominence in the mid-1950s, but his career was overshadowed by the growing popularity of Ahmed Rushdi by late 1950s. He gradually lost favour with film music directors and retired from playback singing in 1966. He later moved to Canada, where he died in 1983.

== Career ==
Saleem Raza was born Noel Dias in a Christian family in Amritsar. After the Partition of India in 1947, he migrated to Pakistan and settled in Lahore. He began his musical journey singing for Lahore Radio Station. Raza received musical training from prominent music composers of the era, including Master Sadiq Ali and Ustad Aashiq Husain. He was introduced to the Pakistani film industry by veteran music composer Ghulam Ahmed Chishti. Raza made his debut in Syed Atta Ullah Shah Hashmi's 1955 film Naukar, notably delivering the emotional duet "Taqdeer Kay Malik, Dekh Zara Kya Zulm Yeh Dunya Karti Hai" with Kausar Perveen. That same year, he sang "Aatay Ho Yaad Bar Bar" in Anwar Kamal Pasha's Qatil. His major breakthrough came in 1957 with the playful hit "Yaaro Mujhe Muaaf Rakho, Main Nashey Mein Hoon” in Saifuddin Saif's film Saat Lakh. He went on to lend his voice to several films, including Aas Paas (1957), Do Rastey, Hamsafar (1960), Seema (1963) and many more. His final film as playback singer was Payal Ki Jhankar (1966).

== Career decline ==
Raza remained a dominating singer in the late 1950s due to his popularity in singing tragic songs. In 1961, music director Khalil Ahmed recorded a sad song, "Kisi Chaman Mein Raho Tum, Bahaar Bun Kay Raho", in Raza's voice for the film Aanchal (1962), but he was not satisfied with his singing style. Initially, he decided to re-record the same song in Mehdi Hassan's voice but changed his mind because Hassan was facing difficulty with high notes as the composition had a wide range and variations. Khalil Ahmed finally invited the famous singer Ahmed Rushdi to sing the same song; Rushdi not only satisfied Khalil but the song also became a hit. Apart from Ahmed Rushdi, Raza was in direct competition with highly talented singers like Munir Hussain, Mehdi Hassan, Masood Rana, Mujeeb Aalam and Bashir Ahmad. Moreover, his voice was best suited for Syed Musa Raza (Santosh Kumar) and his brother Darpan. The two actors also lost their popularity in the mid-1960s. These were the basic factors which affected his popularity. Later, with the change in the recording devices, Raza found it difficult to adjust to the new equipment, resulting in a setback to his career.

== Death ==
Raza migrated to Vancouver, British Columbia, Canada in 1975, and established a music school there. For eight years, from 1975 to 1983, Raza taught music to numerous music students. He also started performing in local South Asian musical concerts. Raza suffered from kidney failure, which claimed his life on 25 November 1983. He was 51 years of age.

== Urdu and Punjabi musical movies ==
Some notable Urdu and Punjabi films for which Raza sang songs include:

Saat Lakh (1957), Ishq-e-Laila (1957), Bedari (1957), Daata (1957), Saheli (1960), Rahguzar (1960), Salma (1960), Gulfam (1961), Saperan (1961), Azra (1962), Mousiqaar (1962), Aanchal (1962), Qaidi (1962), Seema (1963), Ik Tera Sahara (1963), Tauba (1964), Chingari (1964), Payal Ki Jhankar (1966), Noor-e-Islam (1957), Chann Mahi (1956), Kartar Singh (1959), Mouj Mela (1963).

== Some popular songs ==
1. Bedard Zamane Walon Ne, lyrics by Sahil Farani, music by Akhtar Hussain Akhian (based on a composition by Fateh Ali Khan), film: Aas Paas (1957)

2. Shah-e-Madina (saw), lyrics by Naeem Hashmi, music by Hassan Latif, film: Noor-e-Islam (1957)

3. Ay Nazneen Tujh Sa Haseen Hum Ne Kaheen Dekha Nahin, lyrics by Tanvir Naqvi, music by Hassan Latif, film: Shama (1959)

4. Zindagi Mein Ek Pal Bhi Chain Aye Na, lyrics by Tanvir Naqvi, music by Muslehuddin, film: Hamsafar (1960)

5. Bana Kay Mera Nasheman, lyrics by Habib Jalib, music by Master Inayat Hussain, film: Do Rastay (1961)

6. Tujh Ko Maloom Nahin, lyrics by Himayat Ali Shair, music by Khalil Ahmad, film: Aanchal (1962)

7. Jaan-e-Baharaan, Rashk-e-Chaman, lyrics by Tanvir Naqvi, music by Master Inayat Hussain, film: Azra (1962)

8. Tum Jug Jug Geo Maharaj, lyrics by Tanvir Naqvi, music by Rashid Attre, film: Mousiqar (1962)

9. Ae Dil Kisi Ki Yaad Mein Hota Hai Beqarar Kyun, lyrics by Qateel Shifai, music by Master Inayat Hussain, film: Ik Tera Sahara (1963)

10. Na Milta Gar Yeh Tauba Ka Sahara, lyrics by Fayyaz Hashmi, music by A. Hameed, film: Tauba (1964)

11. Jo Kisi Kay Qareeb Hotay Hain, Woh Baray Khush Naseeb Hotay Hain, lyrics by Fayyaz Hashmi, music by A. Hameed, film: Shabnam (1965)

12. Ek Hamein Awara Kehna, Koi Bara Ilzam Nahin, lyrics by Habib Jalib, music by Rashid Attre, film: Insaan (1966)

13. Husn Ko Chand Jawani Ko Kanwal Kehte Hain, lyrics by Qateel Shifai, music by Rashid Attre, film: Payal Ki Jhankar (1966)

14. Yaaro Mujhay Muaf Rakho, Main Nashay Mein Hoon, lyrics by Saifuddin Saif, music by Rashid Attre, film: Saat Lakh (1957)

15. Meray Dil Ki Anjuman Mein, Teray Gham Say Roshni Hai, lyrics by Habib Jalib, music by Rashid Attre, film: Qaidi (1962)

== Awards and recognition ==
- Nigar Award Best Singer for film Hamsafar (1960)
- Nigar Award Best Singer for film Seema (1963)
- Gold Medal Award in 1966 by the Pakistan Arts Council, Lahore
