= Yakke Wali =

1957 Pakistani film

- Directed by: M. J. Rana
- Produced by: Bari Malik
- Starring: Musarrat Nazir; Sudhir
- Music by: Ghulam Ahmed Chishti
- Release date: 1957
- Country: Pakistan
- Language: Punjabi

Yakke Wali is a 1957 Pakistani Punjabi-language film directed by M. J. Rana and produced by Bari Malik. It tells the story of a woman who earns a living by driving a tanga. Musarrat Nazir played the title role in the film with Sudhir, M. Ajmal and Neelo in prominent roles.

Yakke Wali is inspired by the short story "License" by Saadat Hassan Manto.

Yakke Wali was successful at the box office and received rave reviews.

The film was such a hit at the box office that the producer built a film studio in Lahore called Bari Studio from the film's earnings.

== Plot ==
Yakke Wali revolves around a hardworking and brave Punjabi woman, Laali, who supports her family by driving a tanga. She drives around her village but one day owing to her fight with some of the villagers, she leaves the village and goes to the city of Lahore. Being a female in Lahore, it becomes difficult for her to drive the tanga, so she decides to disguise herself as a man and starts driving to make a living.

== Cast ==
- Musarrat Nazir as Laali
- Sudhir as Aslam
- Zarif
- Nazar
- Ilyas Kashmiri
- M. Ajmal
- Neelo
- Zeenat Begum
- Sultan Rahi (as extra character)

== Production ==
After the success of Mahi Munda (1956), Bari Malik decide to produce another film with the same team, and starred Musarrat Nazir and Sudhir again as leads.

== Music ==
All music is scored by music director Ghulam Ahmed Chishti and film songs and dialogue were by Ahmad Rahi.
