= Asha Posley =

Pakistani actress (1927 - 1998)

- آشا پوسلے
- Born: Sabira Begum; 31 May 1927; Patiala, Punjab, British India
- Died: 26 March 1998 (aged 70); Lahore, Punjab, Pakistan
- Other name: First Heroine of Pakistani film industry
- Occupations: Actress; Singer; writer; Playback Singer
- Years active: 1931 - 1998
- Parent: Inayat Ali Nath (father)
- Relatives: Rani Kiran (sister); Kausar Parveen (sister); Najma Begum (sister); Shamsher Ali (brother)
- Awards: Nigar Award (1982)

Sabira Begum better known as Asha Posley (Punjabi, Urdu: آشا پوسلے; 31 May 1927 – 25 March 1998) was a Pakistani actress and singer. She is recognized as the first heroine of Pakistani films when she acted in Pakistani's first film Teri Yaad. The recipient of the Nigar Award For 30 Years of Excellence, she debuted in Lollywood films with Teri Yaad (1948), and also appeared in television dramas.

Some of her notable films, include Sassi (1954), Noukar (1955), Dulla Bhatti (1956), Noor-e-Islam (1957), Ishq-e-Laila (1957), Mukhra (1958), Aaina (1966), Insaniyat (1967) and Main Zinda Hun (1968).

== Early life ==
Asha Posley was born as Sabira Begum in Patiala, Punjab, British India in 1927.

Asha Posley was the daughter of music composer Inayat Ali Nath, who worked with His Master's Voice in Delhi, and the sister of renowned film playback singer Kausar Parveen and her other sisters were Rani Kiran and Najma Begum. She started singing at the age of four and used to sing in children's radio programmes at All India Radio in Delhi. Asha's younger brother Shamsher Ali was a musician. She started performing in theatre plays and dramas in Urdu and Punjabi. During that time her theatres dramas became very popular and she was trained in singing by her father Inayat Ali Nath. She was skilled in singing ghazal, geet, tappe, thumri and dadra.

In 1940 she moved from Delhi to Lahore along with her family. She accompanied her father to the studios to watch the shooting of director B. R Sethi's 1942 film Gawandhi and he offered her a role in the film which she accepted.

== Career ==
She made her debut as a supporting actress in Lahore-made Punjabi film Gawandi (1942), then the lead role in Hindi film Champa (1945), filmed in British India. She was given her professional name Asha Posley by the renowned music director Ghulam Haider. After the independence of Pakistan in 1947, she migrated with her family to the newly created Pakistan.

She was the heroine of the first-ever released film in Pakistan in Urdu language, Teri Yaad (1948). She played the female lead opposite Nasir Khan, famous Indian actor Dilip Kumar's brother, who played the male lead in the film. After playing the female lead role in films during 1940s, 1950s and 1960s then she was cast mainly in supporting roles especially opposite comedian actors Nazar and Asif Jah in most of her films. She acted in 143 films during her film career spanning over 4 decades.

In 1982 she was honored with Nigar Award For 30 Years of Excellence which was given to her by Ilyas Rashidi for her contributions towards the film industry.

Later she transitioned to television and worked in numerous drama serials by appearing in various character roles in television dramas. In 1995 she appeared in drama Red Card which was written by Rimsha it aired on both PTV and STN.

== Personal life ==
Posley's younger sister Kausar Parveen was playback singer in 1950s and 1960s. Her other younger sister Najma was the actress of Urdu and Punjabi television dramas. Asha's younger brother Shamsher Ali was a musician.

== Death ==
Asha Posley died on 26 March 1998 at Lahore, Pakistan at age 70.

== Filmography ==
=== Television series ===
Year	Title	Role	Network
1976	Asha Tamasha	Asha	PTV
1983	Silver Jubilee	Herself	PTV
1995	Red Card	Nani	PTV

=== Films ===
Year	Film	Language	Role
1942	Gowandhi	Punjabi	
1945	Champa	Hindi / Urdu	
1946	Shehar Say Door	Hindi / Urdu	
1946	Aai Bahar	Hindi / Urdu	
1946	Badnami	Hindi / Urdu	
1946	Kamli	Punjabi	
1946	Khamosh Nigahen	Hindi / Urdu	
1946	Paraye Bas Mein	Hindi / Urdu	
1947	Ek Roz	Hindi / Urdu	
1947	Roop Lekha	Hindi / Urdu	
1947	Arsi	Hindi / Urdu	
1947	Papiha Ray	Hindi / Urdu	
1947	Barsat Ki Ek Raat	Hindi / Urdu	
1947	Visakhi	Punjabi	
1948	Papiha Re	Hindi	
1948	Teri Yaad	Urdu	
1950	Galat Fehmi	Urdu	
1952	Shola	Urdu	
1953	Awaz	Urdu	
1953	Shehri Babu	Urdu	
1953	Barkha	Urdu	
1953	Mehbooba	Urdu	
1954	Sassi	Urdu	
1954	Parvaz	Urdu	
1955	Pattan	Punjabi	
1955	Noukar	Urdu	
1955	Bulbul	Punjabi	
1955	Jheel Kinaray	Urdu	
1955	Toofan	Urdu	
1955	Nazrana	Urdu	
1955	Khizan Kay Baad	Urdu	
1956	Dulla Bhatti	Punjabi	
1956	Morni	Punjabi	
1956	Kismet	Urdu	
1956	Chhoti Begum	Urdu	
1956	Peengan	Punjabi	
1956	Intezar	Urdu	
1956	Pawan	Urdu	
1956	Wehshi	Urdu	
1956	Hatim	Urdu	
1956	Guddi Guddi	Punjabi	
1957	Aas Pas	Urdu	
1957	Ishq-e-Laila	Urdu	
1957	Seestan	Urdu	
1957	Pholay Khan	Punjabi	
1957	Sardar	Urdu	
1957	Noor-e-Islam	Urdu	
1957	Pasban	Urdu	
1958	Sheikh Chilli	Punjabi	
1958	Changez Khan	Urdu	
1958	Mukhra	Punjabi	
1958	Neya Zamana	Urdu	
1958	Anarkali	Urdu	
1958	Tamanna	Urdu	
1958	Ghar Jawai	Punjabi	
1959	Alam Ara	Urdu	
1959	Muskarahat	Urdu	
1959	Pardesan	Punjabi	
1959	Lukkan Meeti	Punjabi	
1959	Naghma-e-Dil	Urdu	
1960	Noukari	Urdu	
1961	Son of Ali Baba	Urdu	
1961	Gul Bakavli	Urdu	
1961	Ham Ek Hayn	Urdu	
1961	Muftbar	Punjabi	
1963	Maa Kay Aansoo	Urdu	
1964	Ishrat	Urdu	
1964	Ashiana	Urdu	
1964	Malang	Punjabi	
1965	Hadd Harram	Punjabi	
1965	Dil Ke Tukre	Urdu	
1965	Zamin	Urdu	
1966	Gowandhi	Punjabi	
1966	Majboor	Urdu	
1966	Jalwa	Urdu	
1966	Goonga	Punjabi	
1966	Ghar Ka Ujala	Urdu	
1966	Aaina	Urdu	
1967	Bahadur	Urdu	
1967	Insaniyat	Urdu	
1967	Wohti	Punjabi	
1967	Mela	Punjabi	
1968	Mehndi	Punjabi	
1968	Meri Dosti Mera Pyar	Urdu	
1968	Ashiq	Urdu	
1968	Main Zinda Hun	Urdu	
1968	Ghar Pyara Ghar	Urdu	
1968	5 Darya	Punjabi	
1969	Run Murid	Punjabi	
1969	Pak Daaman	Urdu	
1970	Afsana	Urdu	
1970	BeQasoor	Urdu	
1970	Gul Bakavli	Punjabi	
1970	Insan Aur Aadmi	Urdu	
1970	Bahadur Kissan	Punjabi	
1970	2 Baghi	Urdu	
1970	Dera Sajna Da	Punjabi	
1971	Sher Puttar	Punjabi	
1971	Yaaden	Urdu	
1971	Insaf Aur Qanoon	Urdu	
1971	Parai Aag	Urdu	
1971	Des Mera Jeedaran Da	Punjabi	
1971	Mastana Mahi	Punjabi	
1971	Aansoo Bahaye Pathron Nay	Urdu	
1972	Khan Chacha	Punjabi	
1972	Dil Naal Sajjan Day	Punjabi	
1972	Sohna Jani	Punjabi	
1972	Changa Khoon	Punjabi	
1972	Nizam	Punjabi	
1973	Sehray Kay Phool	Urdu	
1973	Daku Tay Insan	Punjabi	
1973	Wichhria Sathi	Punjabi	
1973	Ghairat Meray Veer Di	Punjabi	
1973	Rangeela Aur Munawar Zarif	Urdu	
1974	Sohna Daku	Punjabi	
1974	Chakkarbaz	Urdu	
1976	Raja Jani	Urdu	
1976	Insan Aur Farishta	Urdu	
1976	Kharidar	Urdu	
1976	Jatt Kurian Tun Darda	Punjabi	
1976	Mafroor	Punjabi	
1976	Goonj Uthi Shehnai	Urdu	
1976	Zaroorat	Urdu	
1977	Aj Diyan Kurrian	Punjabi	
1978	Nidarr	Punjabi	
1978	Aali Jah	Punjabi	
1978	Ghazi Ilmuddin Shaheed	Punjabi	
1978	Santri Badshah	Punjabi	
1978	Curfew Order	Punjabi	
1979	Ham Sab Chor Hayn	Urdu	
1979	Chaltay Chaltay	Urdu	
1980	Takkar	Punjabi	
1981	Sala Sahib	Punjabi	
1981	Yeh Zamana Aur Hay	Urdu	
1982	Ek Din Bahu Ka	Urdu	
1982	Wohti Jee	Punjabi	
1984	Shanakhti Card	Punjabi	
1984	Kalyar	Punjabi	
1984	Dil Maa Da	Punjabi	
1985	Khuddar	Punjabi	
1986	Insaf	Punjabi	
1996	Raju Ban Geya Gentleman	Urdu	

== Awards and recognition ==
Year	Award	Category	Result	Title	Ref.
1982	Nigar Award	For 30 Years of Excellence	Won	Contribution to Cinema	

== See also ==
- List of Pakistani actresses
