= Munir Hussain (singer) =

Pakistani playback singer (d. 1995)

Munir Hussain منیر حسین
- Born: 1930
- Died: 27 September 1995 (aged 65)
- Occupation: Radio, TV, Film Playback singer
- Years active: 1957–1995
- Formerly of: Lollywood, Radio Pakistan

Munir Hussain (1930 – 27 September 1995) was a Pakistani playback singer. While working in Pakistani films for over thirty-eight years, he primarily sung for Urdu and Punjabi language films. His work include 217 songs in 163 films.

He was one of the first Pakistani singers who earned his recognition in Lollywood, a film industry that produces Urdu and Punjabi-language films. Despite his classical music background and prominence in film industry, he was not able to achieve recognition initially because of Ahmed Rushdi and later because of Masood Rana.

== Biography ==
He was born in family of musicians. Music composer Rashid Attre was his uncle. He was active in the industry from 1957 to 85. He was the second prominent singer after Saleem Raza during that period. His duet song from Heer Ranjha titled "Wanjli Walarya" with Noor Jehan is recognised one of his prominent songs. He later sung "Qarar Lootnay Walay" from Saat Lakh (1957) film when he was introduced to the industry as a playback singer. Prior to singing in Saat Laakh, he worked in Nooran film with his song titled "Panchhi Tay Pardesi" and in Mukhra with "Dilla Thehar Ja".

He also sung qawwalis such as "Na Milta Gar Yeh Touba", a musical genre of Sufi devotional song from the film Touba (1964). One of his uncertain songs was banned by Radio Pakistan as it allegedly consist bitter lyrics. He also sung a patriotic song by Faiz Ahmad Faiz titled "Nisar main teri galiyon pe" from Shaheed.

== Death ==
Munir Hussain died on September 27, 1995, in Lahore.

He was awarded Sitara-e- Imtiaz in 2019 on account of his outstanding achievements by the Government of Pakistan in the field of play back singing.
