= Santosh Kumar (actor) =

Pakistani film actor (1925–1982)

Santosh Kumar SI Santosh Kumar
- سنتوش کُمار
- Born: Syed Musa Abbas Raza; 25 December 1925; Lahore, Punjab, British India
- Died: 11 June 1982 (aged 56); Lahore, Punjab, Pakistan
- Other name: The First Romantic Hero of Pakistan
- Education: Osmania University
- Years active: 1947–1982
- Spouses: Jamila Begum (m. 1953) Sabiha Khanum (m. 1958)
- Children: 6
- Relatives: Darpan (brother); Nayyar Sultana (sister-in-law); Mansoor (brother); S. Suleman (brother); Zareen Panna (sister-in-law); Sarish Khan (grand-daughter)
- Awards: Sitara-i-Imtiaz (2010)

Syed Musa Abbas Raza, (Urdu: سیّد مُوسٰی عبّاس رضا; 25 December 1925 – 11 June 1982) better known as Santosh Kumar (Urdu: سنتوش کُمار), was a Pakistani film actor who was popular in the 1950s and 1960s. He is also known as The First Romantic Hero of Pakistan. He was from an Urdu-speaking family from Lahore, Pakistan. His brother Darpan was also a film actor during the same period, while another brother, S. Suleman, was a film director.

== Early life ==
Santosh Kumar's birth name was Syed Musa Raza. He was born in 1925 in Lahore, British India. He graduated from Osmania University, Hyderabad, British India. He then passed the ICS examination and was waiting to work as a civil servant in the government, before a friend persuaded him to look towards cinema instead.

After the Partition of India in 1947, Santosh Kumar migrated to Lahore, Pakistan with his family.

== Career ==
Owing to his education and awareness, Santosh Kumar was always designated to lead national entourages of actors and artists to represent Pakistan in meetings held abroad, and because of this became known as the foreign minister of the Pakistani film industry. This was revealed by him in one of his interviews broadcast by the Radio Pakistan in the mid-1960s.

The first Nigar Award for best actor in the history of Nigar Awards was presented to him for the film Waada (1957). He also won the Best Actor Nigar Awards in 1962 and 1963. He was awarded the Sitara-i-Imtiaz Award by the President of Pakistan in 2010, long after his death. Shaam Dhalay (1960) is the only movie he produced, directed and played the lead role in.

Santosh Kumar was Pakistan's superstar film hero, along with Sudhir, but he was the first-ever top romantic hero. His first film was Ahinsa in 1947 in India. In Pakistan, his first film was Beli in 1950, and in the same year he became film hero of the first-ever Pakistani silver jubilee Urdu film Do Ansoo (1950).

== Personal life ==
Initially, he was married to Jamila Begum in 1953. They had three children: two daughters, Roohi and Aaliya, and a son Syed Mohsin Raza. On 1 October 1958, he married his frequent co-star and actress Sabiha Khanum, with whom he also had three children: two daughters, Fareeha Shahryar and Aafiya Chaudhry, and a son Syed Ahsan Raza. He remained married to both his wives till his death in 1982. Santosh's grandson Syed Mobin Abbas is a fashion model and actor starring in many videos and fashion shows. His granddaughter Sarish Khan is a model and actress.

== Death ==
Santosh Kumar died on 11 June 1982 at age 56.

== Filmography ==
=== Film ===
Year	Film	Language	Role	Notes
1947	Ahinsa	Hindi		Debut film as an actor
1949	Meri Kahani	Hindi	Kishore	
1950	Beli	Punjabi		First film in Pakistan
1950	Do Ansoo	Urdu	Aslam	
1950	Shammi	Punjabi		
1950	Gabhroo	Punjabi		
1951	Akeli	Urdu		
1951	Chanway	Punjabi	Feroz	
1953	Ghulam	Urdu	Kamal	
1953	Awaaz	Urdu		
1953	Sheri Babu	Punjabi		
1953	Mehbooba	Urdu		
1953	Gulnaar	Urdu		
1953	Aaghosh	Urdu		
1954	Raat ki Baat	Urdu		
1955	Qatil	Urdu	Bankay Bihari Laal	
1955	Pattan	Punjabi		
1955	Nazrana	Urdu		
1955	Inteqam	Urdu		
1956	Hameeda	Urdu		
1956	Lakht-e-Jiggar	Urdu		
1956	Kismet	Urdu	Dr. Amjad Ali Khan	
1956	Intezaar	Urdu	Saleem and Naeem (twins)	Double role
1956	Sarfarosh	Urdu	Suhail	
1956	Miss 56	Urdu		
1957	Ishq-e-Laila	Urdu	Qais	
1957	Waadah	Urdu	Bahadur	
1957	Sardaar	Urdu		
1957	Saat Lakh	Urdu	Saleem Ahmad	
1957	Bedari	Urdu	Saleem	
1958	Hasrat	Urdu		
1958	Mukhra	Punjabi	Nadir Khan	Also Co-producer
1959	Muskarahat	Urdu		
1959	Naji	Punjabi	Aslam Khan	
1959	Tere Baghair	Urdu		
1959	Naghma-e-Dil	Urdu		
1960	Saltanat	Urdu		
1960	Shaam Dhalay	Urdu		Also Producer and Director
1962	Mosseqar	Urdu	Sawant	Also Producer
1962	Ghunghat	Urdu	Shahid	
1963	Rishta	Punjabi		
1963	Daaman	Urdu		Also Producer
1963	Seema	Urdu	Shahid	
1964	Safaid Khoon	Urdu		
1964	Ishrat	Urdu		
1964	Bees Din	Urdu		
1964	Azad	Urdu		
1964	Chingari	Urdu		
1964	Haveli	Urdu		
1965	Faishon	Urdu		
1965	Naela	Urdu	Zafar	
1965	Kaneez	Urdu		
1966	Hamrahi	Urdu		
1966	Insaan	Urdu		
1966	Majboor	Urdu	Dr. Aslam	
1966	Mera Salaam	Urdu		
1966	Maa, Bahu Aur Beta	Urdu		
1966	Sawaal	Urdu		
1966	Taqdeer	Urdu		
1966	Tasveer	Urdu		Guest appearance
1966	Lori	Urdu	Javed	
1967	Be Reham	Urdu		
1967	Lahu Pukare Ga	Urdu		
1967	Sitamgar	Urdu		
1967	Devar Bhabi	Urdu	Raza Ali	Also Producer
1967	Aag	Urdu		
1968	Commander	Urdu		
1968	Naheed	Urdu		
1968	Shahansha-e-Jahangir	Urdu		
1968	Jan-e-arzoo	Urdu		
1968	Wohti	Punjabi		
1969	Pakdaaman	Urdu		
1969	Ladla	Urdu		
1969	Maan Beta	Urdu		
1970	Anjuman	Urdu	Wajahat Ali	
1971	Grahasti	Urdu		
1971	Salaam-e-Mohabbat	Urdu		
1971	Jaltey Suraj Ke Neechay	Urdu		
1972	Ek Raat	Urdu		
1972	Mohabbat	Urdu		
1973	Sharabi	Punjabi		
1974	Miss Hippy	Urdu		
1974	Sharabi	Punjabi		
1976	Tallaq	Urdu		
1982	Aangan	Urdu	Magistrate Registrar	
1985	Deewane Do	Urdu		

== Awards and recognition ==
Year	Award	Category	Result	Title	Ref.
1957	Nigar Award	Saat Lakh	Best Actor	Won	
1962	Nigar Award	Ghunghat	Best Actor	Won	
1963	Nigar Award	Daman	Best Actor	Won	
2010	Sitara-i-Imtiaz (Star of Excellence)	Awarded by the President of Pakistan	Arts	Won	

== See also ==
- List of Lollywood actors
