= Allauddin (Pakistani actor) =

Pakistani actor

- علاؤالدین
- Born: Allauddin Butt; 2 February 1920; Rawalpindi, Punjab, British India (now in Punjab, Pakistan)
- Died: 13 May 1983 (aged 63); Lahore, Punjab, Pakistan
- Occupation: Film Actor
- Years active: 1943 – 1983
- Children: 7
- Awards: Won 7 Nigar Awards in 1957, 1958, 1959, 1960, 1963, 1968, 1980; Special Nigar Award for Badnaam (1966 film)

Allauddin Butt, better known as simply Allauddin (Urdu: علاءُ الدین; 2 February 1920 – 13 May 1983) was a Pakistani actor who worked in Pakistani Lollywood movies. His film career spanned over 4 decades.

== Early life and career ==
Allauddin Butt was born into a Kashmiri family in Rawalpindi, Punjab, British India in 1920. Initially wanting to be a singer, he trained as a musician who frequented the likes of Ustad Alla Rakha, the noted tabla player, in Bombay. Then he met the veteran producer/director A. R. Kardar in Bombay who was originally from Lahore. Kardar encouraged him to try the film world and introduced him to some film personalities. When Allauddin turned to acting, he was one of the very few Pakistani film actors who mostly acted as a villain, comedian and only sometimes as a lead actor in his films.

Allauddin was the older brother and mentor of Pakistani film director Riaz Ahmad 'Raju' who was active in the Pakistani film industry from the 1960s to the 1980s.

== Filmography ==
Year	Film	Language	Role	Notes
1940	Prem Nagar	Hindi	A singer	British-Indian film
1941	Kurmai	Punjabi		British-Indian film
1942	Nai Duniya	Hindi		British-Indian film
1943	Sanjog	Hindi		British-Indian film
1948	Mela	Hindi		Indian film
1951	Ghairat	Urdu		Pakistani film
1952	Bheegee Palkain	Urdu		
1953	Shehri Babu	Urdu		
1953	Tarap	Urdu		
1954	Deevar	Urdu		
1954	Mujrim	Urdu		
1954	Raat Ki Baat	Urdu		
1955	Khizan Ke Baad	Urdu		
1955	Mehfil	Urdu		
1955	Paatay Khan	Urdu		
1955	Pattan	Punjabi		
1956	Baghi	Urdu		
1956	Dulla Bhatti	Punjabi		
1956	Mirza Sahiban	Urdu		
1956	Peengan	Urdu		
1956	Sarfarosh	Urdu		
1956	Wehshi	Urdu		
1957	Bara Aadmi	Urdu		
1957	Ishq-e-Laila	Urdu		
1957	Palkaan	Urdu		
1957	Raaz	Urdu		
1957	Sardar	Urdu		
1957	Waadah	Urdu		
1958	Aakhri Nishan	Urdu		
1958	Bharosa	Urdu		
1958	Changez Khan	Urdu		
1958	Chhoomantar	Urdu		
1958	Darbar	Urdu		
1958	Hasrat	Urdu		
1958	Lakhpati	Urdu		
1958	Mukhra	Punjabi		
1959	Gulshan	Urdu		
1959	Jaidad	Urdu		
1959	Jhoomer	Urdu		
1959	Kartar Singh			
1959	Koel	Urdu		
1959	Neend	Urdu		
1959	Raaz	Urdu		
1959	Tere Baghair	Urdu		
1960	Dakoo Ki Larki	Urdu		
1960	Rahguzar	Urdu		
1960	Saheli	Urdu		
1960	Salma	Urdu		
1961	Bara Bajay	Urdu		
1961	Farishta	Urdu		
1961	Mangol	Urdu		
1961	Teen Phool	Urdu		
1962	Azra	Urdu		
1962	Banjaran	Urdu		
1962	Barsaat Mein	Urdu		
1962	Mehtab			
1962	Qaidi			
1962	Shaheed			
1962	Shake Hand			
1962	Susral			
1963	Maa Ke Aansoo			
1963	Qanoon			
1963	Sameera			
1963	Tees Maar Khan	Urdu		
1964	Aurat Ka Pyar			
1964	Farangi	Urdu		
1964	Ik Pardesi Ik Mutiyar			
1964	Ishrat			
1964	Jhalak			
1964	Lai Lagg			
1964	Malang			
1965	Chhoti Si Duniya	Urdu		
1965	Had Haram			
1965	Ik Si Chor			
1965	Phanney Khan			
1965	Tere Sheher Mein			
1965	Zameen			
1966	Abba Ji			
1966	Badnaam			
1966	Insaan			
1966	Janj			
1966	Kohinoor			
1966	Laddo			
1966	Mr. Allah Ditta			
1966	Naghma-e-Sahara			
1966	Nizam Lohar			
1966	Sarhad			
1966	Un Parh			
1967	Chacha Ji			
1967	Dil Da Jani			
1967	Elan			
1967	Jigri Yaar			
1967	Yaar Maar			
1967	Yateem			
1968	Bau Ji			
1968	Chalbaaz			
1968	Chan Chaudhvin Da	Punjabi		
1968	Ghar Paraya Ghar			
1968	Jaggbeeti			
1968	Janab-e-Aali			
1968	Jumna Janj Naal	Punjabi		
1968	Maa Baap			
1968	Mehndi			
1968	Panj Darya			
1969	Choudhween Sadi			
1969	Yamla Jatt	Punjabi		
1969	Zarqa			
1970	Ali Baba Chalis Chor			
1970	Anjan			
1970	Darinda			
1970	Kousar			
1970	Rangu Jatt	Punjabi		
1970	Sajjan Beli	Punjabi		
1970	Sajna Duur Daya			
1970	Sayyan			
1971	Banda Bashar			
1971	Bazigar			
1971	Jalte Suraj Ke Neeche			
1971	Sher Puttar	Punjabi		
1971	Sohna Puttar	Punjabi		
1971	Yeh Aman			
1972	Do Rangeelay			
1972	Ghairat Te Qanoon			
1972	Insan Ik Tamasha			
1972	Khalish			
1972	Umrao Jaan Ada			
1972	Yaar Nibhande Yaarian			
1973	Anmol			
1973	Daman Aur Chingari			
1973	Ik Madari			
1973	Jithe Vagdi A Ravi	Punjabi		
1973	Sohna Veer			
1974	Aaina Aur Soorat			
1974	Deedar			
1974	Dushman			
1974	Harfan Moula			
1974	Jawab Do			
1974	Khanan Dey Khan Parohney			
1974	Laila Majnoo			
1974	Namak Haram			
1974	Nasha Jawani Da	Punjabi		
1974	Qatil Te Mafroor			
1974	Qismat			
1974	Shama			
1975	Be-Misaal			
1975	Dhan Jigra Maa Da			
1975	Doghla			
1975	Mera Naam Hai Mohabbat			
1975	Sultana Daku			
1976	Ankh Lari Badobadi			
1976	Aulad			
1976	Aurat Aik Paheli			
1976	Deevar			
1976	Insan Aur Farishta			
1976	Sachai			
1976	Surayya Bhopali			
1976	Talash			
1976	Waada			
1976	Zaroorat			
1977	Kaaloo			
1977	Kora Kaghaz			
1978	Amber			
1978	Inqalab			
1978	Puttar Phaney Khan Da	Punjabi		
1979	Dubai Chalo			
1979	Pakeeza			
1980	Bandish			
1980	Behram Daku			
1980	Farishta			
1980	Hanstey Aansoo			
1981	Mohabbat Aur Majboori			
1981	Tangey Wali			
1983	Aaj Ki Raat			
1983	Heera Aur Patthar			
1983	Wadda Khan			
1985	Angara			
1986	Baghi Sipahi			
1986	Yeh Adam			
1990	Dushmani			

== Awards and recognition ==
- Nigar Awards for Best Supporting Actor (he was the recipient of this award for 7 different years, including four years consecutively) – 1957, 1958, 1959, 1960, 1963, 1968, 1980
- Nigar Award - Special Award from Nigar Awards, for Badnaam (1966 film)

== Death ==
Allauddin died on 13 May 1983 at age 63.
