= Ghulam Ahmed Chishti =

Pakistani film music composer (1905 - 1994)

- Born: 17 August 1905; Jalandhar, Punjab, British India
- Died: 25 December 1994 (aged 89); Lahore, Punjab, Pakistan
- Other name: Baba Chishti
- Occupations: Film music director composer lyricist of film songs
- Years active: 1935 – 1994
- Awards: Pride of Performance Award by the President of Pakistan (1989)

Ghulam Ahmed Chishti (Punjabi, Urdu: غُلام احمد چِشتی), (often abbreviated to G.A. Chishti) (Punjabi, Urdu: جی اے چِشتی), (17 August 1905 – 25 December 1994) was a Pakistani music composer, attributed as being one of the founders of Indian and Pakistani film music. He is also sometimes referred to as Baba Chishti.

Working with filmi music, Chishti excelled at Punjabi compositions and was 'apt at weaving the design of influences around Punjabi music'. With almost 5,000 tunes to his credit, he composed scores for 140 – 150 films and was the first musician to reach the '100 films' threshold in newly independent Pakistan after 1947. Being a poet, he had written lyrics for 12 of the most popular Pakistani film songs besides writing hundreds of other film songs during his career.

== Biography ==
=== Early life ===
Ghulam Ahmed Chishti was born on 17 August 1905 in a small village Gunnachaur near Jallandhar, now in Nawanshahar district. Early in his childhood, Chishti became fond of music and would sing na`ats at his school. He was later noticed by the playwright Agha Hashar Kashmiri when Chishti came to Lahore in 1934. Kashmiri was a well-known writer and his plays were praised throughout the Indian subcontinent and would occasionally compose songs for theatres.

Kashmiri hired Chishti to assist him with his work and offered him a monthly salary of 50 rupees. Under Kashmiri's influence, Chishti began learning the intricacies of the music industry and trained with him. Upon Kashmiri's death, Chishti joined a recording company and began composing on his own. Amongst his first records were those for Jaddanbai and Amirbai Karnataki in British India before 1947.

=== Composing for films in India ===
Chishti is responsible for bringing Noor Jehan to the Lahore stage, when she was 9-years-old in 1935. Noor Jehan had continued working with Chishti after his later migration to Lahore, Pakistan. He started his career composing music for the films with Deen-o-Dunya in 1936. Once he got some recognition, he was offered to compose music for L. R. Shori's film Sohni Mahival in 1938. There was an earlier movie 'Sohni Mahiwal (1933) also. Later the Censor Board banned his composition for the song Aik Shehr Ki Londiya from the film Shukriya in 1944 bestowing much needed attention upon the composer. He became known for his compositions both in Urdu and Punjabi languages. Baba Chishti also had given some music lessons to the now well-known Indian film musician Khayyam, when Khayyam was still young and briefly had come over to Lahore. Baba Chishti was a contemporary of famous musicians Pandit Amar Nath and Master Ghulam Haider of the 1940s.

=== Migration to Pakistan ===
However, for Chishti's career, things were to take a drastic turn for the better, after the independence of Pakistan in 1947. He decided on migrating to Pakistan in 1949, where the film industry was reeling in its infancy. The new industry was at the mercy of learned musicians and filmmakers and lacked funds to compete with the imported Indian films. Chishti offered his services as a musician to the Pakistani film industry.

Due to shortage of talent in the music industry, it is reported that Chishti had to compose music for three films at the same time in 1949. His initial compositions for Sachai, Mundri and Pheray (1949) were simultaneously produced. He was hired by the pioneer Pakistani film producer Nazir Ahmed Khan to compose music for his film Pheray. Upon its initial screening, Pheray (1949) became a blockbuster hit and earned plaudits for the composer. It is reported that the six songs in the film were written, composed and recorded in a single day. Later in 1955, Punjabi film Pattan (1955) came along and became a musical hit film for Baba Chishti. Pattan (1955) really boosted his career and he became a well-sought-after music director by the film producers after the box-office success of this film. Baba Chishti was the music director for Pakistan's many early successful films - for example, Pakistan's first silver jubilee film Pheray (1949), later Chishti composed music for 2 golden jubilee films - Sassi (1954) and Noukar (1955) and then super-hit films like Dulla Bhatti (1956) and Yakke Wali (1957).

== Chishti's discoveries ==
Ghulam Ahmed Chishti first introduced into the Pakistani film world the following film playback singers...

- Noor Jehan as a singer on Lahore stage when she was just 9 years old, back in 1935.
- Saleem Raza in film Noukar (1955).
- Naseem Begum in film Guddi Gudda (1956).
- Nazir Begum in film Miss 56 (1956)
- Mala in film Abroo (1961).
- Masood Rana in a Punjabi film Rishta (1963).
- Parvez Mehdi in film Chann Tara (1973).

== Songs ==
- O' akhhian laanween naan, phir pachhtaween naan - Pheray (1949)
- Meinun rab di saun teray naal pyar ho gaya - Munawar Sultana, Film:Pheray (1949)
- Ki keeta taqdeeray, kyun torr dittay do heeray - Pheray (1949)
- Jay nahin see pyar nibhana, sahnun duss ja koi thikana - Pheray (1949)
- Likhhian na murrian, pehli raati mera luttia suhaag wey - Laaray (1950)
- Saada sajra pyar, kahwe bar bar - Pattan (1955)
- Chhad jaween na channa banh pharh ke - Zubaida Khanum, film Pattan (1955)
- Bedhi wichh khailia aey mohabbatan da khail oye, Rabb ne milaya sahda pattanan tey mail oye - Pattan (1955)
- Russ gaya mahi sahda, Rabb sahtaun Roussia - Pattan (1955)
- Raj dularey, tohay dil mein basaaun, tohay geet sunaaun (a lori song) - Naukar (1955)
- Chanda ki nagri se aaja re nindia, taaron ki nagri se aaja (a lori song) - Lakht-e-Jigar (1956)
- Wasta aee Rab da tuun jaaen wey kabootra - Dulla Bhatti (1956)
- Babul da wehra chhadd ke ho ke majboor challi - Guddi Gudda (1956)
- Nahin reesaan shehar Lahore diyyan - Guddi Gudda (1956)
- Teinun bhull gayyan sahdian chahwan, wey assaan teinun ki aakhna - Peengan (1956)
- Resham da laacha lakk wey, na khoor ke arria tak wey - Yakke Wali (1957)
- Kalli sawari bhaee, bhaati lohari bhaee - Yakke Wali (1957)
- Teray darr te aake sajana wey, assaan jholi khaali le challay - Yakke Wali (1957)
- Dilaan dian mailian nain chann jayyan soortaan - Mitti Diyaan Moortan (1960)
- Dil naal sajan de lai rakh saan - Naheed Niazi, lyrics by Sikkedar, film Aabroo (1961)
- Sahdi ajab kahani aey - Mera Mahi (1964)
- Tange wala khair mangda - Masood Rana, film Daachi (1964)
- Soch ke yaar banaween bandaya - Inayat Hussain Bhatti, film Jigri Yaar (1967)
- Paagal nein O' jehray sachha pyar kisay naal karde nein - Yaar Des Punjab De (1971)
- Waada karke mukkre jehra sajjan nahin o' weiri ae - Uchhi Haveli (1971)
- Dushman marey te khushi na kariye - kalaam Mian Muhammad Bakhsh, film Ishq Deewana (1971)
- Do dil ik doojay koloun duur ho gayei - Runa Laila, film Zaildar (1972)
- Tak chann paya jaanda eei - Noor Jehan and Pervez Mehdi, film Chann Tara (1973)

== Awards ==
Ghulam Ahmed Chishti was awarded the Pride of Performance Award for Arts in 1989 by the President of Pakistan.

== Death and legacy ==
Ghulam Ahmed Chishti had a reputation in the Pakistani film industry as a very simple, affable and kind person. Due to his popularity and venerability, he was called Baba Jii (father figure) in the film industry. He died at the age of 89 due to a heart attack on 25 December 1994 in Lahore, Pakistan.

In 2017, a number of TV personalities and film personalities gathered at an event at Alhamra Arts Council in Lahore to pay tribute to Ghulam Ahmed Chishti and his music. This event was organized in collaboration with the Lahore Arts Council.
