= Inayat Hussain Bhatti =

Pakistani film actor, producer and director

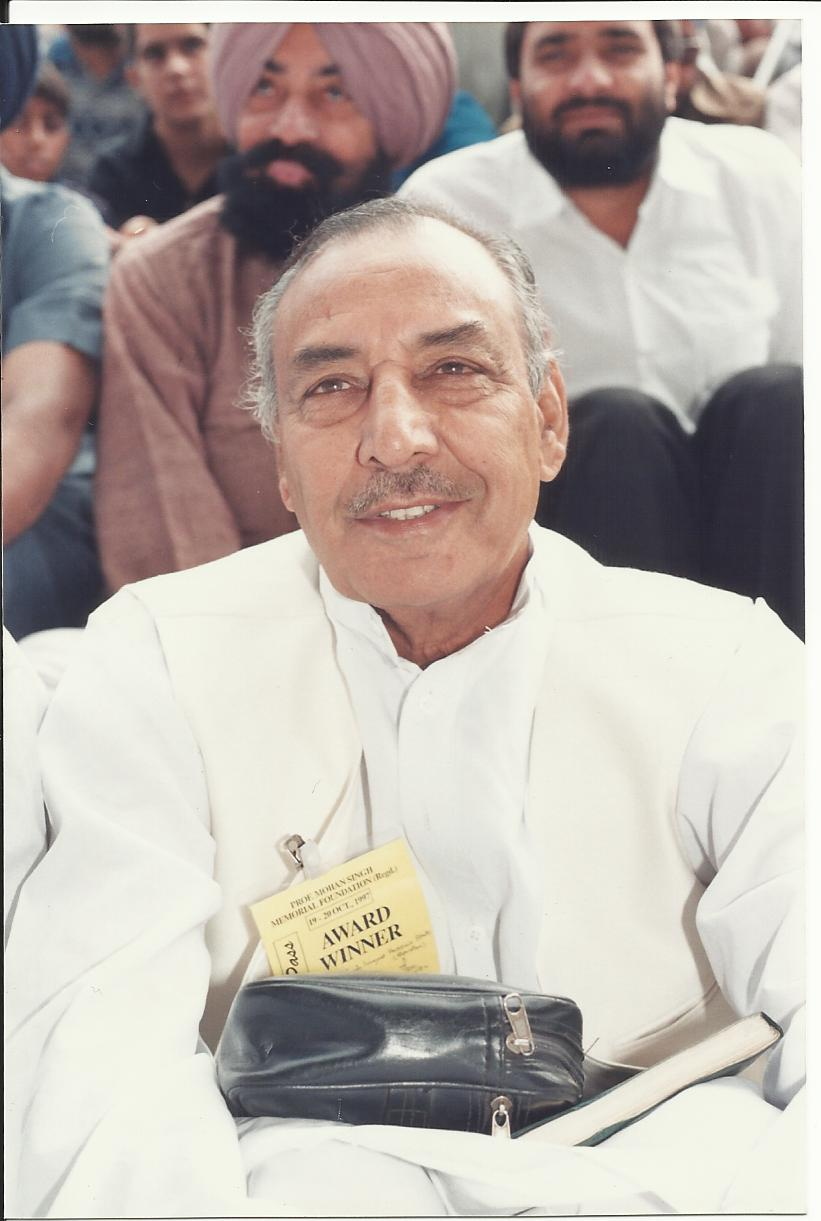
- Inayat Hussain Bhatti
- Born: 12 January 1928; Gujrat, Punjab, British India
- Died: 31 May 1999 (aged 71); Gujrat, Punjab, Pakistan
- Occupations: Singer; Actor; Director; Producer; Social activist; Columnist
- Years active: 1949 – 1999
- Known for: Folk, Pakistani music
- Children: 5, including Waseem Abbas
- Relatives: Kaifee (brother); Aagha Ali (grandson); Ali Abbas (grandson)
- Awards: Pride of Performance (2024)

Inayat Hussain Bhatti (Urdu: عِنایَت حُسَین بھٹّی; 12 January 1928 – 31 May 1999) was a Pakistani film playback singer, film actor, producer, director, script writer, social worker, columnist, religious scholar and an active advocate of the development of the Punjabi language and literature.

In a career spanning some 50 years, he acted in more than 300 movies, produced 30 as well and also directed some, while as a musician he provided approximately 350 songs for some 200 movies. If including non-film work he recorded some 2,500 songs.

== Early and personal life ==
Bhatti was born in Gujrat, Punjab, on 12 January 1928 in a Punjabi Muslim family.

His father Fazal Ellahi Bhatti, a Muslim Rajput of the Bhatti clan, was a well-known social worker in the locality, while Inayat's early interest in the arts was due to Syed Ijaz Hussain Gilani, a lawyer who showed him the world of music and drama, and also Asghar Hayat Jaura, a local kabaddi player, with whom he took an interest in Sufi poetry.

In 1953, Inayat married Shahida Bano, the daughter of Ahmed Din Butt, a retired superintendent of the Indian Railways. Shahida Bano died on 12 March 1997.

Bhatti's children include two sons, three daughters, eleven grandsons and five granddaughters. His youngest son Waseem Abbas is a film, TV and stage artist. The actors Agha Ali and Ali Abbas are his grandsons.

Bhatti's younger brother, known by the stage name Kaifee, was a well-known actor and director from the mid-1960s until the late 1990s.

Bhatti's other relatives in the entertainment industry include Altaf Khan, best-known for his supporting roles, mainly as a villain.

== Early career ==
In December 1948, he moved to Lahore to study law and initially stayed at the MAO College Lahore hostel in Lahore. A few months after his arrival in Lahore, he did his first performance on stage at the YMCA Hall, Lahore. After his YMCA auditorium performance, Bhatti accompanied Ijaz Gilani to Radio Pakistan, Lahore, where he met and became a formal pupil of Master Niaz Hussain Shami, a composer then working for Radio Pakistan in Lahore. It was his association with and training under Master Shami, which facilitated Bhatti's participation in regular radio programs as a singer. He sometimes used to accept character roles in plays broadcast by the Lahore station of Radio Pakistan. Rafi Peer, a playwriter, asked him to be the lead role in his play Akhian (Eyes).

Bhatti was introduced to composer Ghulam Ahmed Chishti by Master Shami in 1949, who offered him an opportunity to record a few songs in producer-director Nazir Ahmed Khan's film Pheray (1949). After this film's popularity, Bhatti became an almost overnight celebrity. Producer-director Nazir offered him the leading role in his Punjabi film Heer (1955) opposite Swaran Lata.

== Career ==
=== Folk theatre ===
During the 1960s, Bhatti also took to folk theatre acting and singing, and toured the rural hinterland of the Punjab along with his theatre group, where he performed his songs and recitation of the works of the great Sufi poets such as Waris Shah, Bulleh Shah, Mian Muhammad Bakhsh, Sultan Bahoo and Shah Abdul Latif Bhittai.

During the 1960s and early 1970s, both Bhatti and Alam Lohar dominated the folk theatre genre in Punjab.

In 1996 Bhatti was invited to attend a Cultural Mela in Mohali, India, by the then Minister of Indian Punjab, Harnek Singh Gharun, the Indian National Congress leader.

=== Films ===
Bhatti was the only male artist in Pakistan film industry who achieved simultaneous super stardom both as an actor and a singer. His first venture, as a film producer was the film Waris Shah (1962), based upon the life and works of the great Sufi poet of Punjab. His second film as a producer Moonh Zor (1965) was also not successful, but then in 1967 his third film Chann Makhna (1968) in which he played the lead role, proved to be a blockbuster at the box office and received the Nigar Award as the best picture of 1968. This was followed by a string of hit movies such as Sajjan Pyara (1968), Jind Jan (1969), Duniya Matlab Di (1970), Ishq Diwana (1971), and Zulam Da Badla (1972) which transformed Bhatti into a superstar actor of the Punjabi movies. The themes of all movies produced by him were based on some social malady of the Punjabi culture.

During his film career, spanning almost five decades, he produced 30 films under the banner of Bhatti Pictures and acted in more than 300 films. He rendered his voice for approximately 500 films, recording more than 2,500 film and non-film songs in Urdu, Punjabi and Sindhi languages.

One of his naat in Arabic is regularly broadcast on Radio Pakistan Lahore, during the holy month of Ramadan for the last four decades.

Bhatti's patriotic song Allahu akbar from the film Genghis Khan (1958) has become a signature tune for the Pakistan Army. The music for this song was composed by veteran music director Rasheed Attre.

His female co-stars included Swaran Lata, Zeenat, Nigar Sultana, Bahar Begum, Meena Shorey, Shirin, Yasmeen, Sabira Sultana, Zummarad, Saiqa, Massarat Shaheen, Naghma, Sangeeta, Rani, Firdous, Saloni, Aasiya, Rukhsana Husna, Neelo and Khannum.

=== Music ===
Beside his solo career as a playback singer, he is credited with singing hundreds of film duet songs with Noor Jehan and Malika Pukhraj to Mala, Irene Parveen, Zubaida Khanum, Munawar Sultana, Kausar Parveen, Naseem Begum, Nahid Niazi, Tassawar Khanum and Afshan.

As a tribute to this legend, his numerous hit songs have been remixed by the new generation of Pakistani singers including Abrar-ul-Haq, Shazia Manzoor, Naseebo Lal, Arif Lohar and many others.

His film music directors include: Ghulam Ahmed Chishti, Master Inayat Hussain, Ghulam Haider, Asghar Ali, Mohammad Hussain, Rasheed Attre, Safdar Hussain, Gul Haider, Mehnu, Tufail Farooqi, Akhtar Hussain, Rehman Verma, Aashiq Hussain, Qadir Faridi, Rafiq Ali, Shad Amrohi, Taalib Hussain, Kamal Ahmed, Salim Iqbal, Tasadduq Hussain, Mohammad Ali Shabbir, Wazir Ali, M Ashraf, Ustad Tafu, Bhagg Gee, Master Abdullah, Nazir Ali, Bakhshi-Wazir and Wajahat Attre.

Inayat Hussain Bhatti has sung poetry of Sufi poets including Waris Shah, Bulleh Shah, Khawaja Ghulam Farid, Mian Muhammad Bakhsh and Shah Abdul Latif Bhittai.

=== Television ===
In the early 1970s, he did Bhatti Da Dayrah, a musical cum talk show every week for a year.

In the 1990s, Bhatti compered a series of TV programmes entitled Ujala on the Sufi saints of Pakistan, and wrote its scripts. The series provided the viewers insight into his Sufistic leanings, and the lives and works of the Sufi poets. It earned its producer, Qaisar Ali Shah, the PTV Award for best religious program.

=== Columnist ===
For years his column Challenge graced the Urdu newspaper Daily Pakistan. In this column, he pointed out the maladies of Pakistani society without any fear.

=== Social worker ===
In 1971, he built and donated a complete tuberculosis treatment ward for poor and needy patients in Gulab Devi Hospital, Lahore in the name of his mother Barkat Bibi. Until his death in 1999, he supported it financially and with other services.

He was against religious sectarianism and was respected by religious scholars of all shades; the Government of Punjab had, on numerous occasions, sought his help in creating religious harmony by way of appointing him as a member of Ittihad Bainul Muslimeen Organisation and a member of the Peace Committee.

=== Politics ===
Bhatti also dabbled in politics by joining Pakistan Peoples Party of Zulfikar Ali Bhutto in 1975. He surprised everyone with his speeches and turned out to be an excellent orator, during the election campaigns of 1977 and 1988, he energetically campaigned for his party, often attending and addressing several different rallies in a single day. During the late 1980s, he was appointed 'secretary of party's cultural wing', a position which he held for a year and then resigned because of his various other commitments.

In 1985 elections, during General Muhammad Zia-ul-Haq’s regime, he contested for a seat in the National Assembly of Pakistan from NA 95, and lost by a narrow margin. Later in his life, he joined All Jammu and Kashmir Muslim Conference of Sardar Muhammad Abdul Qayyum Khan, with whom he shared a cordial relationship.

=== Punjabi culture and religion ===
He was a protagonist of the development of Punjabi language and literature. In the 1970s, along with two other like minded personalities, Mr. Zia Shahid (now chief editor of daily newspaper, Khabrain), and Mr. Masood Khaderposh (a retired bureaucrat), he started the publication of a weekly magazine Kahani (story) for the endorsement of Punjabi language and literature. Bhatti Sahib was also the chairman of Punjab Workers Movement, founded in the 1980s for the same objectives.

He was also an outstanding speaker on different themes of Islam, addressed hundreds of majalis and participated in Muharram congregations regularly.

== Death ==
In 1997, he suffered an attack of paralysis, which impaired his speech and kept him bed-ridden for most of the time thereafter. A few days before his death, the 71-year-old artiste was taken to his native home Gujrat, where on 31 May 1999, he died and was buried next to his parents.

== Selected filmography ==
Year	Title	Director	Producer
1949	Pheray	No	No
1955	Heer	No	No
1959	Kartar Singh	No	No
1964	Waris Shah	No	Yes
1968	Chann Makhna	No	No
1973	Dhiyan Nimaniyan	Yes	Yes
1975	Rabb Da Roop	No	Yes
1977	Sadqay Teri Mout Tun	Yes	No

== Selected discography ==
Studio albums

- Inayat Hussain Bhatti & Afshan, EMI Pakistan, 1978.
- Sacha Sauda - Jind Jaan, EMI Pakistan, 1985.
- Chhalla, Oriental Star Agencies, 1995.
- Kalam-E-Hazrat Sultan Bahoo, Oriental Star Agencies, 1996.
- Saif Ul Mulook, Oriental Star Agencies, 2009.

== Awards and recognition ==
- In recognition of his social services, the Pakistan Medical Association on 2 January 1974, awarded him with Medical College Color, the ceremony was held at Nishtar Medical College, Multan. He is the first and until today, the only non-medical person in the subcontinent to receive this honour.
- After Prince Karim Agha Khan IV and the late prime minister Zulfikar Ali Bhutto, he became the third person to be given honorary life membership of the Punjab Press Club during the mid 1970s.
- Gold medal from the chief minister of Sindh for his patriotic song Allahu akbar.
- Gold Medal from Pakistan People's Party (1976).
- Lifetime Achievement Award from Nigar Awards.
- Lifetime Achievement Award from Bolan Academy.
- Honorary life membership of the Pakistan Film Producers' Association.
- President of Rajput Bhatti Association of Pakistan
- Life chairman of Pakistan Singers' Association.
- Chairman of rehabilitation council of Gulab Devi Hospital, Lahore.
- EMI recording company awarded him a Silver Disc for his 25th year of association with the company (7 December 1976).
- Golden Jubilee film award from Jang Group of Newspapers on 4 July 1996.
- Numerous other awards, medals, shields and commendation certificates from various literary Punjabi committees and associations.
- In 2024 he was awarded Pride of Performance by the Government of Pakistan for his Contribution to Media Industry and arts field.

=== Pakistan Army ===
- For his patriotic songs, Bhatti was bestowed with the following honours by the Pakistan Armed Forces:
- He was the honorary member of numerous army units.

Shields of honour from

- 12 Medium Regiment, Artillery [on the eve of 32nd raising day].
- Officers of 43 Baluch Regiment.
- 48 Signal Battalion [7 January 1993].
- The Century six Artillery Unit.

=== In India ===
He was equally popular across the border in East Punjab (India) and was bestowed with the following honours.

- Awarded with a shield and a trophy by Rotary Club Amritsar South [23 July 1980]
- Awarded with a medallion and a trophy on the occasion of 11 December 1996, International Punjabi Cultural Festival at Mohali [26–27 November 1996]
- Awarded a shield by Chandigarh Press Club, Chandigarh, India, presented to him by the honourable Mr. Justice Amarjit Chaudry, acting chief justice of the Punjab and Haryana High Court [22 October 1997].
- Awarded a shield by the Punjabi Intellectual Forum Chandigarh [25 October 1997]
- shield and a medallion by Sur layamunch Jalandhar [24 December 1997]
- Shield and medallion by Prof. Mohan Singh Foundation, Amritsar [1997]
- After his demise in 1999, Prof. Mohan Singh Foundation Amritsar, announced the "Inayat Hussain Bhatti Memorial Award" as a tribute to him. The first award under this category was awarded to Jasbir Jassi Gurdaspuria of Kudi Kudi fame, in 2001 at Ludhiana, India.
