= Lollywood =

Punjabi and Urdu cinema industry in Pakistan

Lollywood لالی وڈ
- Main distributors: ARY Films; Hum Films; Geo Films; Urdu1 films; PTV Films; Six Sigma Plus; MD Productions; Eveready Pictures

Produced feature films (2024)
- Total: 100+

Lollywood is Pakistan's Punjabi film industry, but has served as the base for both Urdu- and Punjabi-language film production.

Lahore has been the center of Pakistani cinema since independence in 1947. However, with the Urdu film hub largely shifting to Karachi by 2007, the film industry in Lahore became synonymous with the Pakistani Punjabi film Industry.

According to several media sources, the word "Lollywood" is a portmanteau of "Lahore" and "Hollywood", coined in 1989 by Glamour magazine gossip columnist Saleem Nasir, and is usually used comparatively with respect to other film industries in Asian cinema.

== Etymology ==
"Lollywood" is a portmanteau derived from Lahore and "Hollywood", a shorthand reference for the American film industry, Hollywood.

== History ==
Prior to the 1947 partition of India into the Republic of India and Pakistan, the Lahore film industry was initially part of the British Raj-era cinema of India. The Bombay cinema industry (now known as Hindi cinema or "Bollywood" in modern India) was closely linked to the Lahore film industry, as both produced films in the Hindustani language, also known as Hindi-Urdu, the lingua franca of northern and central British India.

== Films ==
Lollywood films in Punjabi were most popular in the 1960s and are often referred to as the golden age of Pakistani Punjabi cinema.

== See also ==
- List of Pakistani films
- List of Urdu-language films
- Lists of Pakistani films by language
- List of Pakistani animated films
- List of highest-grossing films in Pakistan
- Central Board of Film Censors
  - List of films banned in Pakistan

== Bibliography ==
- South Asian Media Cultures: Audiences, Representations, Contexts. United Kingdom, Anthem Press, 2011.
