= Zubaida Khanum =

Pakistani singer (1935 - 2013)

Zubaida Khanum زبیدہ خانم
- Born: Zubaida Khanum; 1935; Amritsar, Punjab, British India
- Died: 19 October 2013 at age 78 Lahore, Punjab, Pakistan
- Genres: Ghazal, Folk music
- Occupation: Film Playback singer
- Years active: 1951–1960 (retired in 1960)

Zubaida Khanum (1935 – 19 October 2013) was a Pakistani playback singer who recorded over 250 film songs during the Golden Age of Pakistani film music of the 1950s and 1960s. She was considered the Pakistani equivalent of Marni Nixon of Hollywood for giving voice to featured actresses in movie musicals.

== Film career ==
Zubaida Khanum made her debut as a singer in the film Shehri Babu in 1953 in which she instantly had many runaway super-hit film songs. Zubaida also acted as a supporting actress in a handful of films including Patay Khan (1955). and Dulla Bhatti (1956). However, she earned a name for herself as the most melodious film playback singer of Punjabi and Urdu films in the 1950s. She recorded over 250 songs, predominantly solo but also in duets with other playback singers especially her pair with Ahmed Rushdi attracted huge public admiration as they sang numerous hit duets during the 1950s.

Her career lasted only for 8 years but her realistic voice and convincing super-hit film songs emerged as a remembrance of the golden period of Pakistan's film industry. She recorded over 300 film songs during her career.{{

She worked with all the famous film music directors of the time including Ghulam Ahmed Chishti, Rasheed Attre, Safdar Hussain, Salim Iqbal, Khwaja Khurshid Anwar and A. Hameed.

== Early life ==
Zubaida Khanum was born in Amritsar, British India, in 1935, in a Muslim family. The family migrated to Lahore after independence in 1947.

Zubaida did not belong to any traditional gharana of classical music and never received any formal music lessons. She was given a head-start as a child when she was given an opportunity to sing at the Lahore station of Radio Pakistan. Renowned Pakistani Swaran Lata and her film producer husband Nazir took a liking to her singing on the radio station and signed her up for their upcoming film Shehri Babu (1953) in which she sang many super-hit film songs.

She married film cameraman Riaz Bukhari at the height of her career and quit the film industry to lead a family life. She had two daughters and two sons. One of her sons is a film cameraman Syed Faisal Bukhari.

== Death ==
Zubaida Khanum died on 19 October 2013 due to cardiac arrest at her home in Lahore at age 78.

== Selected filmography ==
- Shehri Babu (1953)
- Pattan (1955)
- Heer (1955)
- Patay Khan (1955) (she also acted in this movie besides playback singing)
- Chann Mahi (1956)
- Dulla Bhatti (1956) (She acted as a supporting actress)
- Guddi Gudda (1956)
- Baghi (1956)
- Mahi Munda (1956)
- Sarfarosh (1956)
- Saat Lakh (1957)
- Yakke Wali (1957)
- Zulfan (1957)
- Chhoo Mantar (1958)
- Mukhra (1958)
- Kartar Singh (1959 film)
- Koel (1959)
- Raaz (1959)
- Raat Ke Rahi (1960).
- Insan Badalta Hai (1961)
- Ghalib (1961)
