= Nazar (comedian) =

Pakistani comedian, actor

- Portrait of Nazar
- Born: Meerut
- Died: 20 January 1992 (aged 71–72)

Comedy career
- Years active: 1944 – 1961
- Medium: Film
- Occupations: Comedian, actor
- Awards: Nigar Awards (1960) and (1982)

Nazar (1920- 20 January 1992) was a Pakistani comedian and film actor. He debuted in films with a Punjabi language film Gul-Baloch (1944), in which famous Indian singer Mohammed Rafi was also introduced for the first time as a playback singer. Nazar later played comedic role in Pakistan's first feature film Teri Yaad and Pakistan's first silver jubilee film Pheray (1949). As an actor, he appeared in many films and played the lead role in film Judai (1950)‚ directed by Amin Malik.

During the early era of Pakistani films, he worked in Lollywood extensively alongside film actress Zeenat. In 1960, he was awarded the Nigar Award for best comedian for Humsafar (1960) film.

== Filmography ==
Key
†	Remarks denote a short description of the work where available.

#	Title	Year	Comedian	Remarks
1	Gul-Baloch	1944	Yes	
2	Teri Yaad	1948	Yes	
3	Pheray	1949	Yes	Pakistan's first silver jubilee film
4	Judai	1950	Yes	He was cast as the lead actor
5	Sassi	1954	Yes	
6	Baaghi	1956	Yes	
7	Noor-e-Islam	1957	Yes	
8	Aakhri Nishan	1958	Yes	
9	Nagin	1959	Yes	
10	Humsafar	1960	Yes	
11	Gulfam	1961	Yes	
12	Ajab Khan	1961	Yes	
13	Qaidi	1962	Yes	
14	Baji	1963	Yes	

== Awards ==
Year	Award	Nominated work	Category	Result
1960	Nigar Awards	Humsafar (1960)	Best comedian	Won
1982	Nigar Awards	In recognition of his thirty years contribution to Pakistani films	Cinema of Pakistan	Won

== Death ==
Nazar died on 20 January 1992.
