= Sudhir (Pakistani actor) =

Pakistani film actor

- سدھیر
- Born: Shah Zaman Khan Afridi; 25 January 1921; Lahore, British India (now in Pakistan)
- Died: 19 January 1997 (aged 75); Lahore, Pakistan
- Resting place: Lahore, Punjab, Pakistan
- Other name: Shah Zaman Khan
- Occupations: Film Actor, Producer, Director
- Years active: 1940s – 1990s
- Spouse(s): Shammi (m. 1953; death 1997) Zeba (m. 1964; div. 1966)
- Awards: Nigar Awards in 1970, 1974 and 1981

Shah Zaman Khan Afridi, better known as Sudhir (Urdu: سدھیر) or Lala Sudhir (25 January 1921 – 19 January 1997), was a Pakistani actor, director, and producer.

Sudhir was a highly respected film personality.

With his film roles symbolizing valour and bravery, he is known as the first action-hero of Pakistani cinema, appearing in 173 films, including 101 in Punjabi, 70 in Urdu, one in Pashto. He also appeared in a Bollywood film before the Partition of India.

== Early life ==
He was born as Shah Zaman Khan Afridi into a Pashtun family on 25 January 1921 in Lahore, where he lived for much of his life.

== Career ==
=== Cinema ===
Sudhir started his career with a role in a Bollywood film named Farz in 1947 in British India. Afterwards, he migrated to Pakistan. After 1947, he entered Pakistani cinema. His first film was Hichkolay in 1949. He appeared in the hit musical film Dupatta in 1952. His next film, Sassi (1954), became the first ever Urdu film to celebrate a golden jubilee. Dulla Bhatti (1956), Mahi Munda (1956), and Yakke Wali (1957), all starring Sudhir, were the highest grossing Punjabi films of the time. Yakke Wali (1957) was the first blockbuster Punjabi film. These two films led to the building of large film studios in Pakistan. Sudhir was the hero of the action film Baghi (1956), the first Pakistani film to be shown in China.

He was an "action film hero," but appeared as Hatim Tai in Hatim (1956), as Prince Saleem in the famous film Anarkali (1958), as Mirza Jat in the film Mirza Sahiban (1956), as Mahinwal in the film Sohni (1955), and as Mirza Ghalib in the film Ghalib (1961). He acted in the films Nooran (1957), Jhoomer (1959), and Gul Bakawli (1961), etc. He starred in one of the highest grossing Punjabi films, Kartar Singh, in 1959. He later appeared in hits such as the films Farangi (1964) and Ajab Khan (1961), on the struggle against the British Raj.

His film Jeedar (1965) was the first to reach platinum jubilee status. Maa Puttar (1970) was another Punjabi film to celebrate a platinum jubilee. He once fought a real battle with a tiger in the film Sahil (1960). He appeared as a sidekick with his son in the film Dushman Ki Talash (1978).

=== Television ===
At a very old age, he made a special appearance on PTV and was interviewed by Izhar Bobby.

== Personal life ==
Sudhir married four times, twice within his extended family. These two marriages were 'arranged marriages' by his elders, a common practice in Pakistani culture, then with fellow actress Shammi and finally with Pakistani film actress Zeba. His brief marriage to Zeba, who was 24 years his junior, produced no children. Zeba later went on to marry actor Mohammad Ali. Sudhir had four sons from his first three marriages. His eldest son, Noor Zaman Khan, was born to his first wife. His son Meer Zaman, from his second wife, is also an actor. He had two sons – Nadir Zaman Khan and Sikandar Zaman – with actress Shammi. His youngest son, Sikandar, is married to Fatima, a granddaughter of renowned playback singer Noor Jehan. He had no children with Zeba.

== Death ==
Sudhir died on 19 January 1997 and was laid to rest at the Defense Society Graveyard in Lahore, Pakistan.

== Awards and nominations ==
- 1970 - Nigar Awards (Punjabi films)-Best Actor Award for the film Maa Puttar
- 1974 - Nigar Awards (Punjabi films)-Best Actor Award for the film Lottery
- 1981 - Nigar Awards-Special Award for 30 years of excellence.
