= Shahnoor Studios =

Film production studios in Pakistan

- Company type: Private Company
- Industry: Entertainment
- Predecessor: Shori Studios
- Founder: Shaukat Hussain Rizvi and Noor Jehan
- Headquarters: Lahore, Pakistan
- Services: film studio, recording studio

The Shahnoor Studios (also spelled as Shahnur Studios) is the studio taken over by Syed Shaukat Hussain Rizvi and his first wife, Noor Jehan in the aftermath of the independence of Pakistan in 1947. The studio is one of the oldest studios in Lahore, Pakistan and was previously known as Shori Studios.

== History ==
During the 1940s in Bombay, Rizvi initially owned a company called Shaukat Art Productions. Before coming to Pakistan, Rizvi had directed 5 films in India starring Noor Jehan.

- Khandan (1942) - a hit film, with music by Ghulam Haider
- Naukar (1943) - a film written by Saadat Hasan Manto
- Dost (1944) - a hit film, with music by Sajjad Hussain
- Zeenat (1945) - a hit film, with music by Meer Saheb and Hafiz Khan and the all-female super-hit Qawwali "Aahein Na Bhari Shikve Na Kiye"
- Jugnu (1947) - a hit film, with super-hit music by Feroz Nizami

In 1948, after the independence of Pakistan, Noor Jehan and Rizvi shifted to Lahore, Pakistan. On the vandalised remains of what had been the old Shorey Studios, they rebuilt a new studio called Shahnoor Studios, taking the word 'Shah' from Rizvi's name and the word 'Noor' from Noor Jehan's name. It was built from scratch and was finally completed and opened in 1950. The first film to be made there was the Punjabi film, Chanway (1951), a blockbuster film with music by Feroz Nizami. Noor Jehan and Rizvi directed this Punjabi film together, since Rizvi did not speak the Punjabi language fluently. The film became a huge success and brought Noor Jehan fame and fortune in Pakistan.

The studio's early years brought great success as all of Rizvi's films were shot in this studio. However, with the divorce of Rizvi and Noor Jehan in 1955, Noor Jehan had to write off her share of the Shahnoor Studios to Shaukat Hussain Rizvi in the divorce court, to get the custody of her daughter, Zile Huma and also agree to the condition that she would not shoot films in this studio again. Syed Shaukat's career, after the divorce, wasn't as great as it used to be in India, because in marrying Noor Jehan, he was mainly successful because of her. He was only able to make three flop films after his divorce. After the death of Shaukat Hussain Rizvi in 1998 at age 85, this studio is currently managed by Rizvi's three sons Asghar Hussain Rizvi, Shahenshah Rizvi and Ali Mujtaba Rizvi.

== See also ==
- Cinema in Karachi
- Cinema of Pakistan
