= Rehman Verma =

Pakistani music director (1927–2007)

Background information
- Born: Abdul Rehman; 1927; India
- Origin: Lahore
- Died: 11 August 2007 (aged 79–80)
- Genres: Film score
- Occupation: Music director of films
- Years active: 1956 – 1976

Rehman Verma (1927 – 11 August 2007) was a Pakistani music director. He composed playback music for Lollywood's first-ever action movie, Baghi, in 1956. He was one member of the musical duo "Sharma Ji - Verma Ji" along with the Bollywood musician Khayyam whose family name was Sharma. before the partition of India and Pakistan in 1947.

== Early life and career ==
Rehman was born as Abdul Rehman in 1927 in India. He started his music career as "Verma Ji" of the musical duo "Sharma Ji-Verma Ji" that was active in the film industry of the undivided Indian subcontinent. His other partner was music composer Khayyam. Both were disciples of the senior musician G.A. Chishti. After 1947, Khayyam remained in Bombay and Rehman decided to work in the newly established Pakistani film industry in Lahore.

Rehman's first movie in Lollywood was Baaghi, released in 1956. It was the first action-packed film in the history of Pakistani cinema and the first Pakistani film that was screened in China. In 1967, while composing music for the movie Nadira, Rehman taught Kamal Ahmed, who later became an independent music director.

From 1956 to 1976, Rehman created music for 27 Urdu and Punjabi movies. Some of his notable films include Baghi (1956), Aakhri Nishan (1958), Darbar (1958), Alam Ara (1959), Aik Thi Maa (1960), Bombay Wala (1961), Son of Ali Baba (1961), Kala Pani (1963), Ghadaar (1964), Khandan (1964), Khota Paisa (1965), Qabeela (1966), Be Reham (1967), Sassi Punnu (1968), Chor Nale Chattar (1970), Takht-O-Taj (1970), Al-Aasifa (1971), Sipah Salar (1972), Farz Aur Mohabbat (1972), and Laila Majnoo (1973). His last movie, Dara, was released in 1976.

== Popular compositions ==
- 1956 (Film: Baghi - Urdu) ... Balam Tum Haar Geye Jeeta Mera Pyar Mano Na Mano, Singer(s): Zubaida Khanum, Poet: Mushir Kazmi
- 1956 (Film: Baghi - Urdu) ... Kaisay Kahun Main Al-Widaa Jaun Kahan Main Kya Karun, Singer(s): Zubaida Khanum, Poet: Mushir Kazmi
- 1956 (Film: Darbar-e-Habib - Urdu) ... A Khasa-e-Khasan-Russal Waqt-e-Dua Hay Ummat Peh Teri, Singer(s): Zamurrad Bano & others
- 1964 (Film: Khandan - Urdu) ... Haal Kaisa Hay Janab Ka Jawab Dijiye Sawal Ka, Singer(s): Mala, Irene Parveen, Batish, Poet: Mushir Kazmi
- 1967 (Film: Yaaran Naal Baharan - Punjabi) ... Yaaran Naal Baharan Sajna Jis Dharti Tay Yaar Nein Wasday, Singer(s): Masood Rana, Poet: Manzoor Jhalla
- 1967 (Film: Nadira - Urdu) ... Dhina Dhina Dhin Dhina Dil Ko Aaj Dildar Mila, Singer(s): Mala, Najma Niazi & others, Poet: Muzaffar Warsi
- 1968 (Film: Sassi Punnu - Punjabi) ... Jadun Teri Dunya Tun Pyar Tur Jaye Ga, Singer(s): Noor Jehan, Mehdi Hassan, Poet: Ahmad Rahi
- 1968 (Film: Sassi Punnu - Punjabi) ... Ni Ajj Mera Gee Karda, Akkhan Meech Udharian Maaran, Singer: Mala, Poet: Ahmad Rahi
- 1968 (Film: Sassi Punnu - Punjabi) ...Ni Lang Jana Assaan Dillan Tei Paer Dhar Kei, Singer: Mala, Poet: Ahmad Rahi
- 1970 (Film: Chor Nalay Chattar - Punjabi) ... Way Lagian Di Lajj Rakh Lein Kidday Bhul Na Javin Anjana, Singer(s): Noor Jahan, Poet: Manzoor Jhalla

== Death ==
Rehman Verma died on 11 August 2007 at age 79.
