= Arth - The Destination =

2017 film by Shaan Shahid

Arth – The Destination
- Film poster
- Directed by: Shaan Shahid
- Written by: Shaan Shahid
- Based on: Arth by Mahesh Bhatt
- Produced by: Hammad Chaudhry; Faraz Chaudhry; Shaan Shahid
- Starring: Shaan Shahid; Uzma Hassan; Humaima Malick; Mohib Mirza
- Cinematography: Muaz Iqbal
- Edited by: Sagheer Ahmed; Garry Madisonas
- Music by: Sahir Ali Bagga
- Production companies: Cinestar; 5th Element
- Distributed by: HKC Entertainment
- Release dates: 21 December 2017 (Pakistan); 22 December 2017 (Worldwide)
- Running time: 133 minutes
- Country: Pakistan
- Language: Urdu
- Box office: Rs. 13.5 million (US$48,000)

Arth – The Destination is a 2017 Pakistani romantic drama film, written, directed and co-produced by Shaan Shahid under his banner 5th Element. It stars Shahid as Ali, a struggling musician, with Humaima Malick, Mohib Mirza and Uzma Hassan in lead roles. It is a Pakistani remake based on Mahesh Bhatt's 1982 film Arth.

Pre-production began in August 2013 when the film was announced by Shahid. Principal photography began in December 2015 in Lahore and concluded in London in October 2016. Film music has been given by Sahir Ali Bagga. Post-production took place in Pinewood Studios. The film released worldwide on 22 December 2017, under the co-production of Faraz Chaudhry's Cinestar and film distributor Hammad Chaudhry's HKC Entertainment.

== Plot ==
Ali, a struggling musician, comes back to Pakistan from London to continue his music work as he is not getting good work there. When he comes to his hometown, he meets Uzma, a writer, whose marriage with her husband Umer, a film director, is in turmoil because of an up-and-coming actress.

== Cast ==
- Shaan Shahid as Ali; a singer
- Uzma Hassan as Uzma; a writer by day, and a keen fan of Ali
- Humaima Malick as Umaima; a film star
- Mohib Mirza as Umar; a filmmaker
- Imran Momina; Ali's close friend
- Yasir Hussain (cameo appearance)
- Ali Azmat (cameo appearance)
- Rahat Fateh Ali Khan (special appearance)

== Production ==
=== Development ===
Shaan Shahid revealed in August 2013 to The Times of India that when Mahesh Bhatt called him to remake Arth in Pakistani version, he was excited. "The movie will be made in an Urdu version and it's going to a multi-level movie with actors from both the countries", he said. Hammad Chaudhry; film distributor and co-producer said, "Arth 2 is a contemporary take on relationships in modern Pakistan but the essence of the original is intact," adding that Bhatt has "also come on board as mentor." Co-producer Ali Murtaza said to HIP, "We've packaged the old characters [of original Arth] in a fresh screenplay with a new plot". Shahid said to Pakistan Today, "As a writer, for me, it was challenging to take that film out of a condensed art form, add flavour to it and make it into something new".

Bhatt said to the Dawn newspaper that it was the film he started his career with. He commented that Shahid "has complete freedom to reinterpret it however he wishes" and "I am very keen to see" it. Shahid too shared, "I offered him money to buy the rights but he said he doesn't want it." He told that Bhatt said to him, "Just give me credit and make it a symbol of Indo-Pak friendship."

An MoU was signed between ARY Films and Riaz Shahid Films on 23 November 2013 for 5 films. It also included Arth 2, however, ARY Films withdrew their support. Shaan Shahid then clarified later in December 2017 interview with Samaa TV that he believes "such an act limits the scope of the film" that's why he didn't go to media houses.

=== Casting ===
Humaima Malick's name was also revealed as the film was announced. The cast of the film was announced in May 2014, it includes Uzma Hassan. Earlier Humayun Saeed was cast, but due to ARY Films, left. Mohib Mirza replaced him later in December 2015.

In an interview to Samaa TV, Malick told that when Arth 2 was offered to her, she was busy in "Raja Natwarlal and Dekh Magar Pyaar Say". She said that the director told her, "this character was written for me" and "said that if I didn't do it, he will not do it." Mirza told that as the "director had his own vision and nuances set for the character," so he tried to "conceive and portray an already established role" and delivered in his own blended way.

=== Filming ===
Filming began on 1 December 2015 in Lahore on an occasion where director celebrated his 25 years working in Pakistani cinema. The actress Neelo performed film slate's fist clap. Parts were also filmed in Bristol and Scotland. Final leg of filming took place in London from August 2016; and wrapped up in October. Muaz Iqbal has served as film's cinematographer in Pakistan, and Tim wood in Bristol and Scotland.

Shaan Shahid confirmed to HIP that Arth 2 and Zarrar will be the first two Pakistani films to have their post-production in a British film studio; Pinewood Studios, London. The editing and grading stage started in August 2016. It took more than two years to complete the whole production. He said, "Films should not be part of the politics; the intellectual elite of both [India and Pakistan] shouldn't be part of this mayhem".

=== Promotion ===
The film cast teamed up with the UN Women and launched a campaign #EndViolenceAgainstWomen, because the film plot also revolves around multiple social issues including gender equality and the empowerment of women. Shahid said to The News on Sunday, "I feel the tagline 'Decisions determine destiny' is what the film stands for. It is about the power of a single woman."

== Soundtrack ==
Arth – The Destination

Soundtrack album by various artists
- Released: 7 December 2017
- Recorded: 2015–17
- Genre: Soundtrack
- Length: 55:52
- Label: HKC Music
- Producer: Sahir Ali Bagga

Sahir Ali Bagga chronology
Balu Mahi (2017)	Arth – The Destination (2017)

The soundtrack and score for the film has been given by Sahir Ali Bagga. "The songs are actually of my own genre and style. I haven't sought inspiration from any Indian or Western styles." He told The Express Tribune that "All songs are new and we haven't used the age-old formula of forcing through" each genre song, because "a guitarist of today is different from that of the 80s."

No.	Title	Singer(s)	Length
1.	"Sanwar De Khudaya"	Rahat Fateh Ali Khan	7:24
2.	"Ronay De"	Sahir Ali Bagga	4:05
3.	"Aadat"	Sana Zulfiqar	4:21
4.	"Murshed Ji"	Rahat Fateh Ali Khan, Sahir Ali Bagga	6:36
5.	"Fana Huay"	Parisa Farooq	3:51
6.	"Kabhi Main Sochta Hoon"	Sahir Ali Bagga	4:35
7.	"Roohon Kay Darmiyan"	Sahir Ali Bagga	6:58
8.	"Kyun Hai"	Sahir Ali Bagga	4:23
9.	"Hone Do"	Aima Baig	5:53
10.	"Tum Itna"	Sahir Ali Bagga	3:28
11.	"Naya Eik Rabt Paida Kyun Karein"	Humaima Malick	1:12
12.	"Yeh Tum Ho Key Tumhari Yaad"	Shaan Shahid	1:00
13.	"Yeh Rishta Abhi Zinda Hai"	Uzma Hassan	0:51
14.	"Kuch Safar Manzilon Say Shuru"	Shaan Shahid	1:15
Total length:			55:52

== Release ==
After four official teasers, which introduced the characters of the film to the audience; the film's trailer released on 20 October 2017. The film had a limited release in Pakistan on 21 December 2017, a day before its worldwide release on 22 December.

=== Critical reception ===
The film had a premiere event the same day of its release in Lahore. It failed to impress most of the critics and audience.

For Dunya News, Maleeha Mengal praised the music but commented that the film "might soon be forgotten, without a perfect destination but for perfectly logical reasons." Tehreem Azeem praised Uzma Hassan, but criticized its bold scenes and dialogues and said that she wished she had had a remote to fast forward the film. Mahwash Ajaz rated 3 out of 5 stars and praised the film, while she too criticized some of its bold scenes. Dr Tooba Nawaz referred to the film as "masala movie" and too praised Uzma Hassan and film music. For The Express Tribune, Rahul Aijaz too praised the music and Hassan, but rated only 1.5 stars out of 5, saying "There is little entertainment and the message is clouded by amateurish technical errors". Syeda Fizza Hasan Rizvi rated 4 out of 5 stars and praised it, "the movie itself is one emotional rollercoaster ride where you will feel everything".

Shahjehan Saleem of Something Haute rated it 3 stars out of 5 and said that the film "is far from a failure, but also far from perfection", adding, "Despite its shortcomings, the film's strong cast manages" to "veer it towards success." A reviewer from HIP said, "The look of the film is great, but the emotional connect is lacking apart from except probably [Hassan …] However, this film has stretched boundaries for the industry that is for sure." Ayesha Amin of The Nation praised the visual effects and music, but said, "The storyline was not well-defined […] The movie could have been simpler and better, instead of being so dramatic." Manal Faheem Khan of The News International said, "It's dramatic, has an urban flavour, an impressive star cast, is engaging and moves fast. But it's still a badly made film." Yusra Jabeen of DAWN Images praised only Hassan as "the only thing good about Arth 2", while she said that the film was "an absolute disservice" to the "original 1982 classic", as the "basic concept" was "completely let [gone]". Khurram Sohail of Dawn News praised the storytelling, but said that the music could be the only reason to fail the box office numbers.

Dr Dushka H Saiyid of Youlin Magazine said, "It is a film with an interesting storyline and good acting, but the screenplay and directing leave room for improvement." Maman Hussain of Daily Times commented, "Despite strong performances by all four characters, the film lacked expertise on technical grounds", adding that it "is bound to be the success it is truly meant for". Saneela Jawad of Pakistan Today rated 3.5 out of 5 stars and praised it, giving verdict that it "isn't a flawed movie; one wouldn't call it a complete fail, but wouldn't categorize as a perfect movie either." Meshal Ashraf Cheema of Daily Pakistan too praised its cast and music and said, "This film should be named as 'Shaan's Film'", while she criticized its camera work. Omair Alavi praised the music, but rated 2 out of 5 stars and wrote to MAG The Weekly, "Most of the things about Arth were wrong even before the film hit the screens."

=== Accolades ===
Ceremony	Won	Nominated
17th Lux Style Awards	Rahat Fateh Ali Khan – Best Male Singer for "Sanwar De Khudaya"	Uzma Hassan – Best Actress; Humaima Malick – Best Supporting Actress; Sahir Ali Bagga – Best Male Singer for "Murshed Ji"; Sana Zulfiqar – Best Female Singer for "Aadat"
4th Galaxy Lollywood Awards	Sahir Ali Bagga – Best Music; Yasir Hussain – Best Special Appearance	Shaan Shahid – Best Actor in a Leading Role Male; Uzma Hassan – Best Actor in a Leading Role Female; Mohib Mirza – Best Actor in a Supporting Role Male; Humaima Malick – Best Actor in a Supporting Role Female; Uzma Hassan – Best Female Debut; Rahat Fateh Ali Khan – Best Playback Singer Male for "Sanwar De Khudaya"; Sahir Ali Bagga – Best Playback Singer Male for "Ronay De"; "Sanwar De Khudaya" – Song of the Year; Ali Azmat – Best Special Appearance; Mohib Mirza and Humaima Malick – Best On-Screen Couple; Uzma Hassan's pre-interval confrontation scene – Cinematic Moment of the Year

== See also ==
- List of Pakistani films of 2017
