= Ustad Daman =

Pakistani Punjabi-language poet (1911–1984)

- Born: Chiragh Deen; 3 September 1911; Lahore, Punjab, British India (present-day Punjab, Pakistan)
- Died: 3 December 1984 (aged 73); Lahore, Punjab, Pakistan
- Resting place: Banghbanpura, Lahore
- Occupations: Poet; author; mystic; politician
- Years active: 1926 – late 1970s
- Era: Colonial India; Post-independence era
- Movement: Classical Sufi literature Progressive Writers' Movement
- Writing career
- Pen name: Ustad Daman (اُستاد دامن); Daman (دامن)
- Language: Punjabi
- Genres: Nazm; Qissa
- Subjects: Islamic mysticism; politics; love; society

Chiragh Deen (Punjabi pronunciation: [t͡ʃɪɾaːɣ d̪in]; 3 September 1911 – 3 December 1984), known by his pen name Ustad Daman (Note: Punjabi: اُستاد دامن) (pronounced [ʊst̪aːd̪ d̪aːmən]) or Daman, was a Pakistani Punjabi-language poet, writer, mystic and a politician. He was active in politics after the establishment of Pakistan but continued his poetic career and till this day is revered as the "people's poet".

He was introduced into politics by Mian Iftikharuddin, a left-leaning politician and owner of Pakistan Times, a major newspaper in Lahore, Pakistan.

== Early life ==
Chiragh Deen was born in Lahore, Punjab, British India to a Punjabi Muslim family on 3 September 1911.

== Life ==
Ustad Daman's birth name was Chiragh Deen son of Mian Mir Baksh. He was born on 3 September 1911. Ustad Daman was introduced originally as part of the struggle for independence from British rule. A tailor by profession, in 1930, he stitched a suit for Mian Iftikharuddin, who got impressed by his inspiring poetry verse, when the two met each other at his shop. He invited Ustad Daman to recite his poem at a public meeting organized by the Indian National Congress, where Ustad Daman became an instant hit. Pandit Nehru, who was present at that public meeting, dubbed him the 'Poet of Freedom' after listening to his revolutionary anti-imperialist poetry. After this meeting. he became a regular participant in these meetings.

At the time of the 1947 Partition of British India, his shop and house were burned down by rioting mobs and his wife and young daughter were killed. However, Ustad Daman decided to stay in Lahore and the newly created country of Pakistan. He then never remarried and lived the rest of his life in a small room in the 'Old Lahore'. He remained, throughout his life, a fierce opponent of dictatorship, civilian or military, and all corruption and hypocrisy. His work and poetry were published as 'Daman De Moti' after his death by his devoted followers and admirers. The poems he wrote are still widely quoted in the Punjab as well as in other regions of Pakistan.

Pakistani poet Faiz Ahmed Faiz was one of his admirers and occasionally used to visit him in Taxali Gate area of Lahore, Pakistan.

== Songs in films ==
The following poems of Ustad Daman were used in Pakistani films:

- Bach jā munḍyā mōr tau'n, mae'n sadqē tērī tōr tau'n - Sung by Noor Jehan, lyrics by Ustad Daman and music by Feroz Nizami, Chanway film (1951)
- Changā baṇāyā ae sāhnū'n khiḍōṇā - Sung by Noor Jehan, lyrics by Ustad Daman, music by Feroz Nizami, Chanway film (1951)
- Na mein sonay jai na Chandi jai mein pittal bhari paraat, meinu dharti qali kara de, mein nachhaan sari raat - Sung by Humaira Channa, lyrics by Ustad Daman, music by Kaalay Khan, a PTV, Lahore production.

== Death and legacy ==
Ustad Daman was a very close friend of legend poet Faiz Ahmad Faiz, On Faiz's funeral, Ustad Daman wept bitterly, repeatedly saying, "The next turn is mine," right after 13 days, he left this world. He died on 3 December 1984 and was buried in Madhu Lal Hussain graveyard in Lahore.

== See also ==
- Progressive Writers' Movement
- Habib Jalib
- Faiz Ahmed Faiz
- Munnu Bhai
