= Baghi (1956 film) =

1956 Pakistani film by Ashfaq Malik

- Directed by: Ashfaq Malik
- Written by: Ashfaq Malik
- Produced by: Ashfaq Malik; Riaz Ahmad
- Starring: Sudhir; Musarrat Nazir; Yasmin; Allauddin; Agha Talish
- Cinematography: Riaz Ahmad
- Edited by: Muhammad Ismail
- Music by: Rehman Verma
- Production company: A.R. Films
- Distributed by: Shalimar Recording & Broadcasting Company
- Release date: 14 September 1956 (Pakistan)
- Country: Pakistan
- Language: Urdu

Baghi is a 1956 Pakistani Urdu film directed by Ashfaq Malik. Sudhir, Musarrat Nazir, Allauddin, and Agha Talish were among the main cast. Inspired by the American film Apache (1954), it is considered as the first action film of Lollywood.

== Plot ==
The film is based on true events from the time of the British rule in the Indian subcontinent.

== Cast ==
- Sudhir as Akbar
- Musarrat Nazir as Mahesh
- Zubaida Khanum
- Yasmin
- Allauddin
- Talish
- Nazar
- Ghulam Mohammad
- Sultan Rahi (extra)

== Release ==
The film released on 14 September 1956 in Pakistan. The film was the first Pakistani film to be screened in China.

== Production ==
=== Music ===
The music for the film was composed by Rehman Verma, with song lyrics written by the poet Mushir Kazmi, Saghar Siddiqui and A.K. Musarrat. Munawar Sultana, Kausar Praveen, Zubaida Khanum, Pukhraj Pappu and Inayat Hussain Bhatti were the playback singers.
