= Yasmin (actress) =

Pakistani actress (1936–2026)

- یاسمین
- Born: Amina Begum; 1 May 1936; Bombay, Bombay Presidency, British India
- Died: 1 July 2026 (aged 90); Lahore, Punjab, Pakistan
- Resting place: Shah Noor Studio, Lahore, Pakistan
- Other names: Yasmeen; Yasmeen Shaukat; Zarina Begum; Zarina Reshma; Reshma
- Citizenship: British Indian (1936–1950); Pakistani (1950–2026)
- Education: Imambara Girls School, Bombay
- Occupations: Actress; director
- Years active: 1949–1970
- Spouses: Syed Jafar Bokhari (divorced); Shaukat Hussain Rizvi
- Children: 3
- Parent: Atta Muhammad Paracha (father)

Amina Begum (Urdu: یاسمین; 1 May 1936 – 1 July 2026), known professionally as Yasmin or Yasmeen, was a Pakistani actress known for her work in Pakistani cinema. Yasmin was noted for being a perfect fit for tragic roles during her acting career. Her career spanned over two decades during which she appeared as a leading lady as well as played supporting roles in the films of Golden Age of Pakistani cinema.

== Early life and education ==
Amina Begum was born on 1 May 1936 in Bombay, Bombay Presidency, British India. She received her primary education at Imambara Girls School in Bombay. She studied until middle school, though her father, Atta Muhammad Paracha, wished for her to complete her matriculation. Amina, however, was more interested in pursuing a career in acting than in her studies.

Her passion led her to approach A. R. Kardar, who was preparing for the film Dil Lagi, an Urdu version of the folk tale Heer Ranjha. Impressed by her self-confidence and passion, he supported her with a role in the film. The film starred Shyam (Sahira Kazmi's father) and Suraiya in the lead roles.

== Career ==
Yasmin made her debut in 1949 with A.R. Kardar's Dillagi in a supporting role of Sehti. After partition, she shifted to Pakistan and started working in Pakistani cinema.

During the filming of Dillagi, the Partition of India occurred, but Yasmin stayed in India and completed her work in the film. In 1950, she migrated with her family to Lahore, Pakistan. In Pakistan, she initially worked under the names Zarina Reshma and Reshma. The first film in Pakistan in which she starred was Beli, which was written by Saadat Hassan Manto and she had a supporting role in it. Her other early roles under these names included the film Jahad, directed by Zahur Raja, and Amanat, a film by Haider Shah. She was also part of the cast of the film Chan Wey by Shah Noor Productions.

She went on to appear in supporting roles in Dupatta and Lakht-e-Jigar, playing a romantic role opposite Habib, while the main leads were Noor Jehan and Santosh Kumar. She followed it by her lead debut in Morni in 1956.

She later adopted the screen name Yasmin for her 1956 releases such as Kismet and Baghi, where she had a supporting role as the hero's sister.

In the same year, She appeared opposite actor Akmal Khan in the Punjabi film Jabroo, directed by Muzaffar Tahir. She also had a lead role with Talish in Darbar Habib. In 1958, She played the lead role in Tamanna, and received praise for her performance.

== Personal life and death ==
Her relationship with Jafar Bukhari, the cameraman of Chan Wey, developed into a romance and eventually marriage. As a director, Jafar Bukhari cast Yasmin as a heroine in several of his films, including Anjam, Masoom, Zehr-e-Ishq, Nai Lakhi, and Bharosa. The popular song "Dil Deta Hai Ro Ro Dahai" from the film Ishq Par Zor Nahi was filmed on her.

Due to serious differences, she and Jafar Bukhari separated. She then married the film director Syed Shaukat Hussain Rizvi, the former husband of singer Noor Jehan. She has two sons with Rizvi, Shaneshah Hussain Rizvi and Syed Ali Murtaza Rizvi, while Jafar Bukhari has a son, Nasir Bukhari, who resides in Europe.

Yasmin died at her home on 1 July 2026, at the age of 90. She was buried at Shah Noor Studio in Lahore.

== Filmography ==
=== Television ===
Year	Title	Role	Network
1997	Tum Jo Chaho Tu Suno	Herself	PTV

=== Film ===
Year	Title	Role	Language	Notes	Ref.
1949	Dillagi	Sehti	Hindi		
1950	Jahad		Urdu		
1950	Beli		Urdu		
1950	Amanat		Urdu		
1951	Eid		Urdu		
1951	Chan Wey	Shaddo	Punjabi		
1952	Dupatta		Urdu		
1953	Mehbooba		Urdu		
1953	Aaghosh		Urdu		
1955	Shararay		Urdu		
1955	Jheel Kinaray		Urdu		
1955	Ilteja		Urdu		
1956	Morni		Punjabi		
1956	Kismet	Hameeda	Urdu		
1956	Mirza Sahiban		Urdu		
1956	Jabroo	Chandi	Punjabi / Bengali		
1956	Baghi		Urdu		
1956	Darbar-e-Habib		Urdu		
1956	Haqeeqat		Urdu		
1957	Aas Paas		Urdu		
1957	Anjaam		Urdu		
1957	Murad		Urdu		
1957	Masoom		Urdu		
1958	Tamanna		Urdu		
1958	Jan-e-Bahar		Urdu		
1958	Zehr-e-Ishq	Salma	Urdu		
1958	Mukhra		Punjabi		
1958	Touheed		Urdu		
1958	Bharosa		Urdu		
1958	Darbar		Urdu		
1958	Aadmi		Urdu		
1959	Lalkar		Urdu		
1959	Khul Ja Sim Sim		Urdu		
1960	Bhabhi		Urdu		
1960	Humsafar		Urdu		
1960	Salma	Hameeda	Urdu		
1960	Shehbaz		Urdu		
1961	Surayya	Yasmeen	Urdu		
1961	Farishta		Urdu		
1961	Dandian		Punjabi		
1961	Ghalib	Umrao	Urdu		
1963	Sukh Ka Sapna		Urdu		
1963	Paharan		Punjabi		
1963	Awaz De Kahan Hai		Urdu		
1963	Ishq Par Zor Nahin		Urdu		
1963	Kala Pani		Urdu		
1963	Baaji		Urdu	Cameo	
1963	Maine Kya Jurm Kiya		Urdu		
1963	Daaman		Urdu		
1963	Maa Beti		Urdu		
1964	Mama Ji		Punjabi		
1964	Shikari		Urdu		
1964	Mamta		Urdu		
1964	Jhalak		Urdu		
1964	Head Constable		Urdu		
1966	Laddo		Punjabi		
1967	Zinda Laash	Shirin	Urdu		
1969	Kousar	Kousar	Urdu		
