= Dillagi (1974 film) =

1974 Pakistani film

Dillagi دل لگی
- film poster
- Directed by: Aslam Dar
- Written by: Aziz Meeruti
- Produced by: Aslam Dar, Qamar Butt
- Starring: Shabnam; Nadeem; Nayyar Sultana; Lehri; Agha Talish; Rehan
- Music by: Master Rafiq Ali
- Release date: 15 February 1974
- Country: Pakistan
- Language: Urdu
- Box office: A Platinum jubilee film

Dillagi (Urdu: دل لگی) is a 1974 Pakistani romantic drama Urdu film directed by Aslam Dar.

The movie cast included Shabnam, Nadeem, Lehri, Nayyar Sultana, and Agha Talish. Dillagi was a platinum jubilee hit film in the Karachi cinemas citcuit and won 3 Nigar Awards. The music of Dillagi became very popular, especially the tracks, "Dillagi mein aisi dil ko lagi" and "Murjhaye hue phoolon ki qasam" were the popular songs in Pakistan.

== Plot ==
The film story is about a poor motor mechanic who, on every payday, spends his whole salary by pretending to be rich. His ladylove is the daughter of a millionaire, who pretends to be a poor girl. He gives her a lift in a rainy night of one such payday while driving back from a high society club in his precious but borrowed car. Both, while still hiding their true status, fall in love with each other. The girl soon finds out his true identity as a motor mechanic who is an employee of a music-loving workshop owner, but she continues to love him as she finds him a nice and sincere person. She invites him to her birthday party. There the poor mechanic realizes that his girlfriend belongs to an upper-class rich family. He feels dejected and comes back home with a broken heart. A gentleman doctor, who is his client at the workshop, sympathizes with him and tries to get them both married by arguing with the girl's father, but his efforts go in vain, and the millionaire arranges the marriage of his daughter with some other rich guy. The broken-heart mechanic couldn't deal with the reality and dies in a very miserable manner. In the final moments of the marriage ceremony, the millionaire surrenders to the fact that his daughter is not happy and dramatically allows her to marry the mechanic. She rushes towards his lover's house in a bridal dress only to find him dead on his bed. Then, in an immense shock, she dies too.

== Cast ==
- Shabnam (as Najma)
- Nadeem (as Raja)
- Nayyar Sultana(as Baji)
- Nimmo (as Rano)
- Lehri (as Ustaad Baiju Bawra)
- Aqeel
- Agha Talish (as Doctor Sahib)
- Rehan
- Tingu
- Rafiq
- Albela (as Jani)
- (Guest actor: Sultan Rahi)

== Music and soundtracks ==
The music of the film was composed by Master Rafiq Ali.

The song list includes:

1. Aag Laga Kar Chhupnay Walay Sun Mera Afsana, Singer: Masood Rana, Poet: Mushir Kazmi

2. Dillagi Mein Aisi Dil Ko Lagi Keh Dil Kho Gaya, Singer: Noor Jehan, Poet: Riaz ur Rehman Saghar

3. Ham Chalay Is Jahan Say, Dil Uth Gaya Yahan Say, Singer: Mehdi Hassan, Poet: Mushir Kazmi

4. Mujhay Jan Say Bhi Pyara Mehboob Mil Gaya Hay, Singers: Mujeeb Aalam, Noor Jehan, Poet: Bashir Khokhar

5. Murjhaye Huay Phoolon Ki Qasm, Is Des Mein Phir Na Aaun Ga, Singer: Masood Rana, Poet: Mushir Kazmi

6. Pyar Karna To Koi Jurm Nahin Hay Yaro, Singers: Nadeem, Riaz Malik, Albela & Co., Poet: Khawaja Pervaiz

7. Saath Hamara Chhootay Na, Yaad Rahay Yeh Baat, Singers: Mehdi Hassan, Noor Jehan, Poet: Khawaja Pervaiz

8. Sayyan Anari Meray Dil Ko Jalaye Ray, Singer: Noor Jehan, Poet: Khawaja Pervaiz

== Box office and reception ==
Dillagi did well at the box office by completing 84 weeks in theaters. Dillagi is regarded as one of the most successful romantic and musical movies in the history of Pakistani cinema.

== Awards ==
Dillagi received 3 Nigar awards in the following categories:

- Best actress -- Shabnam
- Best sound editor—Wajid Ali
- Best comedian -- Lehri

== Impact ==
- Dillagi was the first big breakthrough of the popular cinema duo, Nadeem and Shabnam, and afterwards, made the duo one of the top priorities of filmmakers.
- Dillagi was unofficially remade in India as Mohabbat Ki Arzoo in 1994.
