= Saba Imtiaz =

Pakistani author, journalist, music critic, and screenwriter

- Born: June 18, 1985 (age 40); Ras-al-khaimah, UAE
- Occupations: Author, journalist, critic, screenwriter
- Notable work: Karachi, You're Killing Me!

Saba Imtiaz is a Pakistani author, journalist, music critic, and screenwriter from Karachi. She previously worked for The News International and The Express Tribune, and is currently writing for The New York Times, The Guardian, and The Christian Science Monitor. Karachi, You're Killing Me! is her debut novel first published in 2014. Imtiaz also wrote the script of the romantic comedy Dekh Magar Pyar Se (2015).

== Career ==
Imtiaz started her career as a freelance journalist and column writer. She had worked for various newspapers like The News International and The Express Tribune before she started writing for The New York Times, The Guardian, and The Christian Science Monitor.

Imtiaz is also a music critic and wrote several articles on music, especially Coke Studio.

=== Karachi, You're Killing Me! ===
Imtiaz is the author of the comedy crime novel Karachi, You're Killing Me!, which was released on February 1, 2014 by the Random House India. The book was mostly positively reviewed . The novel is about a 28-year-old reporter, Ayesha Khan, living in one of the world's most dangerous cities, Karachi, and her misadventures and her efforts to find a nice lover. In April 2015, India's Abundantia Entertainment acquired the Bollywood film rights to the novel, which Vikram Malhotra would produce. Imtiaz would also be involved in developing the screenplay.

=== No Team of Angels ===
Imtiaz has written her second novel No Team of Angels, about the conflict in Karachi. The novel is not yet published.

=== Film career ===
Imtiaz is also a screenwriter, her debut script was Dekh Magar Pyar Se, which was made into a film and was directed by Asad ul Haq, starring Humaima Malick and Sikander Rizvi. The film was released on August 14, 2015, and was commercial success, though it received mixed reviews from critics.

As of 2016, Imtiaz has developed the script of Noor, a Bollywood adaptation of her own novel Karachi, You're Killing Me!. Produced by Bhushan Kumar and starring Sonakshi Sinha in the lead, the film is set for April 2017 release.

== Bibliography ==
- Karachi, You're Killing Me! (2014)
- No Team of Angels (TBA)

== Filmography ==
- 2015 Dekh Magar Pyar Se (Screenwriter)
