= Sikander Rizvi =

Pakistani restaurateur and film actor

- Born: Sikander Rizvi; Karachi, Sindh, Pakistan
- Occupations: Actor, chef
- Years active: 2015–present
- Relatives: See Jehan-Rizvi family

Sikander "Xander" Rizvi (Urdu: سکندر رضوی) is a French Pakistani restaurateur and film actor who founded Xander's.

Born in Karachi to the Jehan-Rizvi family; where his grandparents Noor Jehan and Shaukat Hussain Rizvi and other relatives Sonya Jehan, Zille Huma and Ahmed Ali Butt are all film personalities, he made his acting debut with a leading role in the romantic comedy Dekh Magar Pyar Se along with Humaima Malick–which earned him praise. He also owns a café in Karachi.

== Career ==
Rizvi started his acting career in 2015 with his debut film Dekh Magar Pyar Se, playing the lead role opposite Humaima Malick. The romantic comedy was directed by Asad ul Haq and scripted by Saba Imtiaz. The film was released on the Independence Day, 14 August 2015.

Rizvi also played a supporting role in Hassan Rana's 2017 war action film Yalghaar opposite Shaan Shahid, Humayun Saeed, and Adnan Siddiqui. The film is based on the true story of the Second Battle of Swat, also known as Swat Operation. The film was released in June 2017.

== Personal life ==
Sikander Rizvi was born in Karachi, Sindh, Pakistan to a Pakistani father, Akbar Hussain Rizvi, and French mother, Florence Villiers Rizvi. His paternal grandmother, actress–singer Noor Jehan, and grandfather, film producer Shaukat Hussain Rizvi, were the most influential film personalities of the subcontinent. His sister, Sonya Jehan, and cousin Ahmed Ali Butt, are both actors, while his aunt, Zil-e-Huma, was a singer. He is also known as Xander among family and close friends, and owns a café named Xander's in Karachi. He married his long-time girlfriend Irene, on February 20, 2025.

== Filmography ==
Year	Title	Role	Notes
2015	Dekh Magar Pyar Se	Sikander "Sikki" Badshah Khan	
2017	Yalghaar	Azhar	
