= Chan Wey =

1951 film

Chanway
- Theatrical release poster
- Punjabi: چن وے
- Directed by: Noor Jehan; Shaukat Hussain Rizvi (supervisor)
- Written by: Imtiaz Ali Taj; Ehsan (dialogues)
- Produced by: Shaukat Hussain Rizvi
- Starring: Noor Jehan; Ghulam Mohammad; Santosh Kumar; Jahangir Khan
- Music by: Feroz Nizami
- Production company: Shahnoor Studios
- Release date: 24 March 1951
- Country: Pakistan
- Language: Punjabi

Chanway or Chan Wey (transl. O, Moon) is a 1951 Pakistani Punjabi-language film directed Noor Jehan (in her directorial debut) with the supervision of Shaukat Hussain Rizvi.

It was written by Syed Imtiaz Ali Taj. Feroz Nizami provided the music for the film's soundtrack. It premiered in Lahore's Regent Cinema on 24 March 1951.

The film was the first Pakistani film directed by a woman. "Mundeya Sialkotiya" was a popular track from the film's soundtrack.

== Cast ==
The cast of the film includes:

- Noor Jehan as Seema
- Santosh Kumar as Feroze
- Ghulam Mohammad as Fazal
- Jahangir Khan as Aslam
- Saleem Raza as Chiragh
- Nafees Begum as Khairaan
- Himalyawala as Doctor
- Yasmin as Shaddo

== Production ==
After migrating from India, Shaukat Hussain Rizvi established his Shahnoor Studios and decided to produce a film. He was advised to produce film in Punjabi because at that time Punjabi films such as Pheray (1949) and Laraay (1950) were commercially successful rather than Urdu films. So, he directed and produced Chan Wey and his spouse Noor Jehan was credited as the director because he himself did not know Punjabi. Thus, it became the first Pakistani film by a female director.

The film also marked Noor Jehan's return to the screen since her last film Jugnu (1947), also directed by Rizvi and had music composed by Nizami.

== Release and reception ==
The film premiered on 24 March 1951 in Lahore's Regent cinema. It became commercially successful with a theatrical run of 18 weeks.

== Soundtrack ==
Feroz Nizami composed the film's music on the lyrics of F.D. Sharf and Ustad Daman. All songs were performed by Noor Jehan except one, which was performed by Ali Bakhsh Zahoor.

=== Track listing ===
Song title	Lyrics by	Sung by	Notes
Tere Mukhre Da Kala Kala Til Way, Mera Kud Ke Le Gya Dil Way, Way Mundeya Sialkotiya	F.D. Sharf	Noor Jehan	Popular song from the film's soundtrack
Changa Banaya e Sanu, Kach Da Khadona	F.D. Sharf	Noor Jehan	
Way Tu Bhul Na Javin	F.D. Sharf	Noor Jehan	
Chann Deya Totya Wey, Dillan Deya Khotya	F.D. Sharf	Noor Jehan	This song establishes Noor Jehan's mastery over difficult singing
Bedardaan Di Dunya Kohlun	F.D. Sharf	Ali Baksh Zahoor	
Lamiaan Manzilan, Dil Door Kinaray	F.D. Sharf	Noor Jehan	
Bach Ja Mundeya Mor Tun	Ustad Daman	Noor Jehan	
Teray Long Da Peya Lashkara	F.D. Sharf	Noor Jehan and chorus	
