= Sonya Jehan =

Pakistani actress

- سونیا جہاں
- Born: 24 April 1980 (age 46); Karachi, Sindh, Pakistan
- Citizenship: Pakistani, French
- Education: Saint Martins College of Art
- Occupation: Actress
- Years active: 2005–present
- Spouse: Vivek Narain (m. 2005)
- Children: 2
- Relatives: Jehan-Rizvi family

Sonya Rizvi (Urdu: سونیا جہاں; born 24 April 1980), better known by her stage name Sonya Jehan, is a Pakistani and French film actress who predominantly works in Urdu and Hindi-language films. She is the granddaughter of legendary singer Noor Jehan and filmmaker Shaukat Hussain Rizvi. Jehan is known for portraying supporting roles in several critically acclaimed films, including the Indian drama My Name Is Khan (2010), the English-language political thriller The Reluctant Fundamentalist (2012) and the coming-of-age Pakistani musical drama film Ho Mann Jahaan (2015). Her role in the last of these earned her nomination for Nigar Award for Best Supporting Actress.

In addition to acting in films, she has judged a cooking show and is the owner of Cafe Flo, a French restaurant in Karachi.

== Life and career ==
Jehan was born on 24 April 1980 in Karachi, Sindh, Pakistan. Her father, Akbar Hussain Rizvi, is a Karachi-based businessman, and her mother, Florence Rizvi is a French national. Her original name is Sonya Rizvi but she changed her last name to Jehan in honour of her grandmother, legendary singer Noor Jehan. She has a brother, named Sikander Rizvi, a film actor and restaurateur. She is the granddaughter of legendary filmmaker Shaukat Hussain Rizvi, niece of singer Zille Huma and the first cousin of actor Ahmed Ali Butt.

Jehan had her early education in O-levels from the Centre of Advanced Studies and A-Levels from The Lyceum School, both located in Karachi. She then went to London for higher studies and received a bachelor's degree in designing from the Central St Martins College of Art and Design, following which she returned to Pakistan the same year.

Jehan made her film debut with the romantic historic film Taj Mahal: An Eternal Love Story in 2005 opposite Kabir Bedi. Jehan played the role of Mumtaz Mahal, who is betrayed by the film's central character. The film received mixed reviews from critics, and was moderately successful at the box office; however, Jehan's performance was praised by film critics. Jehan's second release, was Sudhir Mishra's romantic drama Khoya Khoya Chand in 2007, with Shiney Ahuja. The film revolves around the lifestyle of celebrities with aplomb with the 1950s film industry as its backdrop. The film received positive reviews from critics, and Jehan earned critical acclaim for her performance. Jehan next appeared as a religious American Muslim professor in the Karan Johar-directed social drama My Name Is Khan (2010), alongside Shah Rukh Khan, Kajol and Jimmy Shergill. The film, set in America, received positive feedback from the critics and her performance was praised in particular. The film was the most expensive Bollywood film of 2010 and also the highest-value buy over for any Indian film, surpassing the previous record of INR900 million (US$14 million) and was declared as the highest-grossing Bollywood film of 2010.

Mira Nair's political thriller drama film The Reluctant Fundamentalist (2013), was Jehan's first Hollywood production. The film was based on the 2007 novel of the same name by Mohsin Hamid. Jehan played role of professor Nadia, alongside Riz Ahmed, Kate Hudson and Meesha Shafi. Her performance was critically praised. The film mixed reviews from critics, however, her performance was praised. Commercially, the film performed moderately well, with a grossing revenue of $2,028,731.

Jehan next starred in the 2016 coming-of-age musical drama Ho Mann Jahan. Directed by Asim Raza, she was cast alongside Sheheryar Munawar, Mahira Khan and Adeel Hussain. Her portrayal was a Sabina, an outspoken independent women. Upon release, the film as well as her performance received praise. The film was a commercial success as well, with a worldwide earning of Rs. 21.26 crore (US$760,000), Ho Mann Jehan was the top-grossing productions of the year, and ranks among the highest-grossing Pakistani films of all the time. At the annual Nigar Awards, she received a Best Supporting Actress nomination for her performance in the film.

== Personal life ==
Sonya Jehan is married to Vivek Narain, an Indian banker, since 2005, and lives in Delhi, India. The couple have two children, a daughter Noor, and a son Nirvan. Sonya, along with her husband Vivek owns a members-only lifestyle club, The Quorum, which has branches in Gurgaon and Mumbai. The Food & Beverage for the next-door restaurant, Coalesce, is handled by Sonya. Jehan's family is the owner of a French-themed restaurant in Karachi, called Cafe Flo.

== Filmography ==
Year	Film	Role	Notes
2005	Taj Mahal: An Eternal Love Story	Mumtaz Mahal	
2007	Khoya Khoya Chand	Ratanbala	
2010	My Name is Khan	Hasina Khan	
2012	Foodistan	Judge	Television show
2013	The Reluctant Fundamentalist	Nadia	
2016	Ho Mann Jahaan	Sabina	Nominated—Nigar Award for Best Supporting Actress
2019	Parey Hut Love	Gulrukh	Cameo appearance
TBD	Kaptaan: The Making of a Legend	Uzma Khanum	Post-production
