= Master Rafiq Ali =

Pakistani film musician

Master Rafiq Ali ماسٹر رفیق علی
- Origin: Lollywood
- Genres: Film score
- Occupation: Music director
- Years active: 1958 – 1987

Master Rafiq Ali was a Pakistani music director. He is known for composing playback music for Lollywood movies Chhoomantar (1958), Akhri Chattan (1970), Sakhi Lutera (1971), Dillagi (1974), and Zubaida (1976).

== Career ==
Rafiq Ali started his career as a music director with the film Chhoomantar in 1958. In the movie, the actor Zarif and Zubaida Khanum sang the song "Bure Naseeb Mere Vairi Hoya Pyaar Mera" both individually and in duos. In 1970, Rafiq Ali was hired by director Aslam Dar for his movie Aakhri Chattan. Hum Hain Deewane Tere, Ashiq Parwane Tere was a chorus-based song by Musheer Kazmi that was written for Mala. Rafiq's next film was Zia Mohyeddin's Mujrim Kaun (1970). "Mere Mehboob Mere Pyaar Kei Qabil Tu Hei" by Noor Jehan and "Honton Pe Tabasum Nazar Sehmi Sehmi" by Mala and Ahmad Rushdi were notable film songs that he composed.

The 1974 film Dillagi was a crucial milestone in the career of Rafiq Ali. The film's songs rendered by Mujeeb Alam, Masood Rana, Noor Jehan, and Mehdi Hassan had many super hit film songs. In 1976, Rafiq Ali experienced success when he composed playback music for Aslam Dar's directional film Saiyyan Anari. His last work as a musician was the Punjabi film Silsila, released in 1987.

== Notable compositions ==
Rafiq Ali composed 112 songs for 26 Urdu and Punjabi films:

Song title	Lyricist	Singer(s)	Film
Buray Naseeb Meray Vairi Hoya Piyar Mera	Ahmad Rahi	Zubaida Khanum, Zarif	Chhoomantar (1958)
Akhian Wey Raatin Saun Na Deindian	Hazin Qadri	Noor Jehan	Chhoomantar (1958)
Aeni Gall Duss Deyo Nikkay Nikkay Taariyo	Ahmad Rahi	Noor Jehan	Choomantar (1958)
Doongiyan Shaaman Aayyan	Ahmad Rahi	Noor Jehan	Chhoomantar (1958)
Haaey Pyaria Oye Meri Jugni	Hazin qadri	Noor Jehan, Inayat Hussain Bhatti, Naseem Begum	Bachha Jamoora (1959)
Hum Hain Dewaanay Teray Aashiq Parwanay Teray	Mushir Kazmi	Mala & Co	Akhri Chattan (1970)
Koi Jadugar Aaya Meray Dil Mein Samaya	Mushir Kazmi	Runa Laila	Sakhi Lutera (1971)
Aag Laga Kar Chhupnay Walay Sun Mera Afsana	Mushir Kazmi	Masood Rana	Dillagi (1974)
Dillagi Mein Aisi Dil Ko Lagi Keh Dil Kho Geya	Mushir Kazmi	Noor Jehan	Dillagi (1974)
Ham Chalay Is Jahan Say Dil Uthh Geya Yahan Say	Mushir Kazmi	Mehdi Hassan	Dillagi (1974)
Murjhaye Huay Phoolon Ki Qasm Is Des Mein Phir Na Aun Ga	Mushir Kazmi	Masood Rana	Dillagi (1974)
Mujhay Jan Say Bhi Pyara Mehboob Mil Geya Hay	Mushir Kazmi	Mujeeb Alam, Noor Jehan	Dillagi (1974)
Sathi Meray Bin Teray Kaisay Beetay Gi	Fayyaz Hashmi	Akhlaq Ahmed	Zubaida (1976)
