= Humjoli (1946 film) =

- Starring: Noor Jehan
- Release date: 1946
- Country: India
- Language: Hindi

Humjoli is a Bollywood film. It was released in 1946.

== Cast ==
- Noor Jehan
