= Zil-e-Huma =

Pakistani singer

- Born: 26 February 1945; Lahore, British India
- Died: 16 May 2014 (aged 69); Lahore, Pakistan
- Other names: Zile Huma, Zil E Huma
- Occupations: Singer; playback singer
- Years active: 1990s – 2014
- Spouse: Aqeel Butt (divorced)
- Children: Ahmed Ali Butt (son), Mohammad Ali Butt, Mustafa Ali Butt and Hamza Ali Butt
- Parent(s): Noor Jehan (mother); Syed Shaukat Hussain Rizvi (father)
- Relatives: Sonya Jehan (niece); Sikander Rizvi (nephew)
- Family: Nephew: Ayuk Ali Butt

Zil-e-Huma (Urdu: ظِلِّ ہُما) (26 February 1945 – 16 May 2014) was a Pakistani singer and daughter of Noor Jehan.

== Early life ==
Born to the Jehan-Rizvi family, she was the youngest daughter of Noor Jehan and filmmaker Syed Shaukat Hussain Rizvi from Noor Jehan's first marriage. Noor Jehan and Shaukat Hussain Rizvi together also had 2 older sons named Akbar Rizvi and Asghar Rizvi. Huma was born in 1944 in Lahore, Punjab, Pakistan, the youngest of the three children of her parents.

When she was a child, her parents divorced. Her father demanded the family's studio Shahnoor Studios, in return for her custody in the divorce court and was given custody of the studios.

== Career ==
Growing up with her mother in Karachi, singing and music became her passion but during her childhood, her mother Noor Jehan refused to allow her to undergo training in music.

In the early 1990s, after having decided to make music her profession, she commenced formal education in music under Ghulam Mohammed, her mother's Ustad (teacher). She said in an interview, "Learning at that age wasn't an easy game but I had made up my mind to keep on learning as learning never ends". Zil-e-Huma usually used to sing her mother's super-hit film songs on Pakistan Television.

== Personal life ==
At an early age, she married a jeweler, Aqeel Butt, and settled down to a married life. She has four sons including Ahmed Ali Butt. She eventually divorced her husband and decided to pursue a musical career.

== Illness and death ==
Huma died on 16 May 2014 at a Lahore hospital from end-stage kidney disease (chronic kidney failure) and diabetes mellitus; she was 69 years old. A few days ago, doctors had amputated her leg as she was diabetic for some years.
