= Kismet (1956 film) =

Pakistani drama film

- Urdu: قسمت
- Directed by: Nazir Ajmeri
- Written by: Khalil Qaiser
- Story by: Khalil Qaiser
- Produced by: Ismael Noor
- Starring: Musarrat Nazir; Santosh Kumar; Yasmin; Ilyas Kashmiri; Asha Posley
- Cinematography: Riaz Bukhari
- Music by: Feroz Nizami
- Production company: Al-Hamra Films
- Release date: 16 March 1956
- Country: Pakistan
- Language: Urdu

Kismet is a 1956 Pakistani drama film directed by Nazir Ajmeri. It starred Musarrat Nazir, Santosh Kumar and Yasmin. It deals with theme of Talaaq, and was the debut film of Khalil Qaiser as writer and he wrote the script. The music was composed by Feroz Nizami.

A commercially successful film, it is considered as one of best film of Ajmeri's career. It was remade in 1976 by S. Suleman as Tallaq.

== Plot ==
The plot revolves around a happily married couple, Dr. Amjad Ali Khan and Naseema Begum, who become parents to their newborn daughter, Aziza. The couple leads a happy life until the arrival of Hameeda, a poor and orphaned widow whom Amjad brings to his house after her husband's death. Naseema's sister, Tallat, creates doubt in her mind and constantly provokes her to pressure her husband into abandoning Hameeda. However, Amjad considers Hameeda as his sister and refuses to do so.

One day, Naseema shocks the entire family when she asks Amjad in front of everyone whether he should abandon Hameeda or divorce her. Amjad divorces her instantly, and she returns to her parents' house. Her father, whose health had already deteriorated, worsens further. Amjad, who had been treating him, checks on him, but his condition becomes critical, and he is taken to the hospital for surgery. Amjad performs the operation, but unfortunately, he doesn't recover and passes away. Naseema's mother files a case against Amjad, suspecting that he intentionally caused her husband's death due to personal reasons.

Naseema and Amjad both regret their decisions and consider reconciliation but find no way to do so. When Naseema tries to defend Amjad in front of her mother, she is thrown out of the house. The homeless Naseema finds shelter in the house of a kind old man. Through the newspaper, she learns that her mother has won the case, and Amjad is sentenced to death. She goes to the jail where Amjad's family has also gathered. In the meantime, a car hits Aziza, injuring her badly. The daughter's death devastates Naseema.

She wakes up abruptly, realizing it was just a dream. She thanks God it was just a dream and rushes towards Amjad. She asks for forgiveness to demand for divorce. Just then, her father and Tallat arrive, and Tallat tries to provoke her against Amjad, but a slap from Naseema silences her. The family then enjoys a peaceful evening tea together.

== Cast ==
- Musarrat Nazir as Naseema
- Santosh Kumar as Dr. Amjad Ali Khan
- Yasmin as Hameeda
- Asha Posley as Tallat
- Ilyas Kashmiri as Arshad Ali Khan
- Rekha as Amjad and Arshad's mother
- M. Ismael as Rukhsat Ali
- G. N. Butt
- Majeed as Naseema and Tallat's father

== Music ==
All lyrics are written by Tufail Hoshiarpuri; all music is composed by Feroz Nizami.

Kismet
No.	Title	Singer (s)	Length
1.	"Aye Khuda-e-Pak, Aye Parwardigar, Teri Rehmat Ka Nahin Koi Shumar"	Munawar Sultana
2.	"Albelay Naina, Banti Kar Kar Haar Gayi Mein"	Roshan Ara Begum
3.	"Manjhdaar Mein Kashti Hai, Nahi Koi Sahara"	Kausar Parveen
4.	"Tarap Raha Hai Pyar, Gayi Mein Haar"	Kausar Parveen
5.	"Nigah-e-Yaar Hi Samjhe"	Pukhraj Pappu, Hafiz Atta Muhammad Qawwal and chorus
6.	"Yeh Suhana Samaa Aaye Ga Phir Kahan"	Leila Arjumand Banu
7.	"So Ja, Mere Chand, Meri Aankh Ke Tarey"	Saleem Raza
