= Dupatta (1952 film) =

1952 film

- Directed by: Sibtain Fazli
- Produced by: Aslam Lodhi and Sibtain Fazli
- Starring: Noor Jehan; Sudhir; Ajay Kumar; Yasmin; Bibbo
- Music by: Feroz Nizami
- Release date: 28 March 1952
- Country: Pakistan
- Language: Urdu

Dopatta is a Pakistani Urdu language film released on 28 March 1952, directed and co-produced by Sibtain Fazli.

== Plot summary ==
The film story revolves around a girl who marries an army officer. They both soon have a baby daughter. Soon the husband is sent to the front of World War II. Later he is reported missing. After many months of anxiety and heartbreak, the husband returns disfigured, mutilated and not easily recognizable. The devoted wife still accepts him back despite his handicaps.

== Cast ==
- Noor Jehan
- Sudhir
- Ajay Kumar
- Zarina (Note: later known as Yasmin)
- Bibbo
- Ghulam Mohammad
- Azad

== Production ==
This film was directed by Sibtain Fazli and the music composer was Feroz Nizami whose film music and film songs became highly popular. The film's screenplay was written by Hakim Ahmad Shuja. The film was co-produced by Aslam Lodhi who was Sudhir's uncle and wanted to promote Sudhir's film career by this film.

== Box office success ==
This 1952 film proved to be a 'blockbuster' musical hit film due to its highly popular film songs and music.

== Soundtrack ==
Song title	Sung by	Lyrics by	Music by	Film notes
Chandani Raatein, Sab Jug Soye, Hum Jaagein, Taaron Say Karein Baatein	Noor Jehan	Mushir Kazmi	Feroz Nizami	This song was a breakthrough top hit film song for Mushir Kazmi
Pehli Mulaqat Mein Ji, Chandani Raat Mein Ji, Jia Mera Kho Gaya, Hai Kisi Ka Ho Gaya	Noor Jehan	Mushir Kazmi	Feroz Nizami	
Mein Ban Patang Urh Jaun Gi, Hawa Kay Sang Lehraun Gi	Noor Jehan	Mushir Kazmi	Feroz Nizami	
Tum Zindagi Ko Gham Ka Fasana Bana Gaye	Noor Jehan	Arsh Lakhnavi	Feroz Nizami	
Pigalti Aag Say Iss Dil Ko Jalta Dekhtay Jao	Noor Jehan	Mushir Kazmi	Feroz Nizami	
Ruk Jao Sajno Thoda Jinna Hor	Mohammed Rafi	Mushir Kazmi	Feroz Nizami	
Sanwaria, Tohay Koi Pukaray, Aa Ja Ray	Noor Jehan	Mushir Kazmi	Feroz Nizami	
