= Mushir Kazmi =

Film songs lyricist from Pakistan and India (!915 - 1975)

Mushir Kazmi (1915 – 8 December 1975) was a film score lyricist and a poet from Pakistan and India.

== Early life ==
Mushir Kazmi was born in Banur, Punjab in 1915. His breakthrough song was in Chandani Raatein of Dopatta (1952 film).

According to The News International

"If one were to credit 'Dopatta', composer Feroz Nizami, Noor Jehan and lyricist Mushir Kazmi would head the list with several outstanding and still memorable melodies".

Mushir Kazmi ended up writing 97 film songs for more than 50 films during his career.

== Death ==
Mushir Kazmi died on 8 December 1975 in Lahore and was buried at Mominpura Graveyard, Lahore, Pakistan.

== Popular film songs ==
Song title	Sung by	Lyrics by	Music by	Film notes
Chandani Raatein, Sab Jug Soye, Hum Jaagein, Taaron Say Karein Baatein	Noor Jehan	Mushir Kazmi	Feroz Nizami	This song was a breakthrough top hit film song for Mushir Kazmi, film Dopatta (1952 film)
Mein Ban Patang Urh Jaun Gi, Hawa Kay Sang Lehraun Gi	Noor Jehan	Mushir Kazmi	Feroz Nizami	Film Dopatta (1952 film)
Tum Zindagi Ko Gham Ka Fasana Bana Gaye	Noor Jehan	Mushir Kazmi	Feroz Nizami	Film Dopatta (1952 film) - producer: Sibtain Fazli
Pigalti Aag Say Iss Dil Ko Jalta Dekhtay Jao	Noor Jehan	Mushir Kazmi	Feroz Nizami	Film Dopatta (1952 film)
Nainon Mein Jal Bhar Aaye, Moorakh Mann Tarpae Ray, Rooth Gaya Mera Pyar	Naseem Begum	Mushir Kazmi	Mian Sheheryar	Film Begunah (1958)
Samaan Jab Pyara Ho, Pyar Ka Dil Ko sahara Ho	Ahmed Rushdi and Nazir Begum	Mushir Kazmi	M. Ashraf	Film Maan Kay Aansoo (1963 film)
Ae Rah-e-Haq Kay Shaheedo, Wafa Ki Tasveero, Mere Naghme Tumhare Liye Hain	Naseem Begum	Mushir Kazmi	Salim Iqbal	Turned out to be a highly popular Pakistani patriotic song, Maadar-e-Watan (1966 film) - film producer Saifuddin Saif
Shama Ka Shola Bharak Raha Hay	Mala Begum	Mushir Kazmi	Nisar Bazmi	Film Aadil (1966)
Shikwa Na Kar, Ghila Na Kar	Mehdi Hassan	Mushir Kazmi	Wazir Afzal	Film Zamin (1965)
Jan-e-Mann Itna Bata Dou Kay Mohabbat Mohabbat Hai Kya	Runa Laila	Mushir Kazmi	Master Abdullah	Film Commander (1968)
Aag Laga Kar Chhupnay Walay Sun Mera Afsana	Masood Rana	Mushir Kazmi	Master Rafiq Ali	Dillagi (1974)
Dillagi Mein Aisi Dil Ko Lagi Keh Dil Khoh Geya	Noor Jehan	Mushir Kazmi	Master Rafiq Ali	Dillagi (1974)
Ham Chalay Is Jahan Say Dil Uthh Geya Yahan Say	Mehdi Hassan	Mushir Kazmi	Master Rafiq Ali	Dillagi (1974)
Murjhaye Huay Phoolon Ki Qasm Is Des Mein Phir Na Aun Ga	Masood Rana	Mushir Kazmi	Master Rafiq Ali	Dillagi (1974)
Mujhay Jan Say Bhi Pyara Mehboob Mil Geya Hay	Mujeeb Alam, Noor Jehan	Mushir Kazmi	Master Rafiq Ali	Dillagi (1974)
