= Damodar Sharma =

Indian academic and engineer (b. 1941)

Damodar Sharma (born 1941 in Churu, India) is an engineer, educator, founding Vice-Chancellor of the Rajasthan Technical University and winner of the Silver Elephant award of the Bharat Scouts and Guides. He received a Bachelor in Civil Engineering (B.E.) from MBM Engineering College, Jodhpur (1964), a Masters in Technology (M. Tech.) with specialization in geotechnical engineering from Jai Narain Vyas University, Jodhpur (1970) and received his Doctor of Philosophy (Ph.D.) in 1986.

Damodar Sharma initially worked as a junior engineer at the Jawahar Sagar Dam on the Chambal River. He qualified for an appointment as assistant engineer with the Rajasthan Public Service Commission and in 1964 the Director of Technical Education (Rajasthan) appointed him as lecturer in Civil Engineering based at Kota.

== Academic career ==
In December 1965 Damodar Sharma was appointed Lecturer in Civil Engineering at MBM Engineering College, Jodhpur. In 1983, he was appointed as Reader in Civil Engineering at the Government Engineering College, Kota. From 1983 to 1985 he served on deputation at the Mosul Technical Institute, Iraq. During this assignment he was involved in teaching and the development of the remote sensing and surveying laboratory at the institute. In 1990 he received the appointment of Professor in Civil Engineering at Jai Narain Vyas University and became Dean, Faculty of Engineering in 2001. Subsequent to retirement from Jain Narain Vyas University he served as founder Principal of the Geetanjali College of Engineering, Udaipur and then as Principal, Arya Institute of Technology, Jaipur. From 2006 to 2009 he served as the founding Vice-Chancellor of the Rajasthan Technical University, Kota. He then served as Vice-Chancellor of Suresh Gyan Vihar University in Jaipur. He continues to be a member of the Executive Committee and Patron of the MBM Engineering College Alumni Association.

== Memberships ==
- The Institution of Engineers (India)
- Indian Society of Remote Sensing
- Indian Water Works Association
- Indian Society for Technical Education
- Leader trainer and a member of the national training team of the Bharat Scouts and Guides
- Chartered civil engineer.
- MBM Engineering College Alumni Association

== Publications/presentations ==
- Development of a lightweight dynamic penetrometer, Indian Geotechnical Society, July 1972.
- Ground water prospecting, Journal of Power and River Valley Development, April 1972.
- Geophysical methods of subsurface exploration as applied to Civil Engineering work, The Indian Engineer, July 1972.
- Some experiments with a light penetrometer with a view to assess its suitability for exploring subgrades and foundations, Journal of the Indian Road Congress, Vol.35-3, April 1973.
- Effect of house orientation and design on solar heating and thermal comfort, Indian Society of Desert Technology, Vol. 6 No.2, July 1981 (Transaction All India Conference Bikaner).
- Socioeconomic aspects of rural water supply problems in Rajasthan, National Seminar on the Water Resources Management for Rural Development, Oct, 18-19, Sultanpur, Uttar Pradesh
- Use of Electronic distance Measuring Instruments in Civil Engineering, Institution of Engineers (India) 1985-86.
- Use of Bentonite suspension in control of seepage from water harvesting structures in arid regions of Rajasthan, Indian Geotechnical Conference at Warangal (Andhra Pradesh)
- A booklet on soil conservation.

== Famine prevention and water supply studies ==
- Conducted hydrographic survey of the Jawai Dam in Pali district to estimate the availability of drinking water to the city of Jodhpur
- Conducted youth against famine camp covering 100 villages of Jodhpur district to study rural water supply problems

== Hobbies ==
- Rock Climbing, completed Gujarat Institute of Mountaineering Training course
- Received Rambler's Badge from Bharat Scouts and Guides for completing walks from Dalhousie to Chamob and Panchmarhi to Piparia
