= Raja Natwarlal =

2014 Indian film by Kunal Deshmukh

- Directed by: Kunal Deshmukh
- Written by: Screenplay: Parveez Shaikh; Dialogues: Sanjay Masoomm
- Story by: Kunal Deshmukh
- Produced by: Siddharth Roy Kapur
- Starring: Emraan Hashmi; Humaima Malik; Paresh Rawal; Kay Kay Menon; Deepak Tijori; Prasad Oak; Prachi Shah
- Cinematography: Raaj A. Chakravarti
- Edited by: Anand Subaya
- Music by: Songs: Yuvan Shankar Raja; Background Score: Sandeep Shirodkar
- Production company: UTV Motion Pictures
- Distributed by: UTV Motion Pictures
- Release date: 29 August 2014
- Running time: 140 minutes
- Country: India
- Language: Hindi
- Budget: ₹470 million
- Box office: ₹268 million

Raja Natwarlal is a 2014 Indian Hindi-language crime thriller film directed by Kunal Deshmukh and produced by Siddharth Roy Kapur under UTV Motion Pictures. The film features Emraan Hashmi in the title role, alongside Humaima Malik, Paresh Rawal, Kay Kay Menon and Deepak Tijori. The film was released on 29 August 2014 and received positive reviews from critics.

== Plot ==
Mithilesh Kumar Shrivastava a.k.a. Raja (Emraan Hashmi) is a small-time conman who cons people for a living along with his partner in crime Raghav Desai (Deepak Tijori). He is in love with a bar girl named Ziya (Humaima Malik). Feeling sorry for her, Raja decides he wants to go for a big catch so that he can marry his lady love and she won't have to work in a bar anymore. That's when the trouble starts. Along with Raghav, Raja makes a grand plan to swindle a huge amount of money from two baddies. The plan is successful and Raja decides to celebrate.

This is when Varda Yadav (Kay Kay Menon), a billionaire based in Cape Town, enters. The money belonged to him, and upon realizing it had been stolen by two street cons, Varda orders them to be killed. Varda's men find Raghav and kill him. Raja witnesses this and decides to avenge the loss.

He seeks the help of a seasoned crook Victor Singhal alias Yogi (Paresh Rawal), whom Raghav used to talk about before his murder. After a lot of persuasion, Yogi agrees to help Raja have his payback. Later it is revealed that Yogi is actually Raghav's older brother. Yogi trains him, and eventually, they form a team of crooks and set out to Cape Town to finish off Varda where he takes his revenge.

== Cast ==
- Emraan Hashmi as Mithilesh Kumar Srivastava aka Raja Natwarlal
- Paresh Rawal as Victor “Yogi” Singhal
- Humaima Malik as Ziya
- Kay Kay Menon as Varda Yadav
- Deepak Tijori as Raghav "Raju" Desai
- Prachi Shah as Raghav's wife
- Ashiesh Roy as Kaashi
- Namit Shah as Vicky
- Mohammed Zeeshan Ayyub as Jojo
- Shakti Sinha as Waliya
- Sumit Nijhawan as Inspector Singh
- Prasad Oak as Sub-Inspector Mhatre
- Vaibhav Mathur as Customer at the dance bar

== Production ==
In May 2013, it was first reported that Kunal Deshmukh's next project would be produced by UTV Motion Pictures. Deshmukh selected Emraan Hashmi for the lead role, collaborating with him for the fourth time. The film was titled Shaatir and Hashmi was revealed to play the character of a 'shaatir' conman in the film. In April 2014, the film's title was changed to Raja Natwarlal inspired by the 1979 Amitabh Bachchan film Mr. Natwarlal.

In June, it was reported that Abhishek Bachchan would play another lead role besides Hashmi. But he opted out and next month Paresh Rawal was signed for the role. Jacqueline Fernandez and Priyanka Chopra were approached to play the lead female role, but both actresses could not accommodate the dates. In November 2013, Pakistani model and actor Humaima Malick was cast as the female lead. Deepak Tijori was signed for a role in the film in December. Kay Kay Menon was signed for an important role and Deshmukh stated that his character named Vardha Yadav had been modelled on the Sahara India Pariwar chief Subrata Roy. Pritam Chakraborty, who had composed the music for all of Deshmukh's films, was supposed to work on this film's music, too, but was replaced by Yuvan Shankar Raja. Deshmukh later stated that Pritam wanted to take a break and that it was Pritam himself who referred Yuvan Shankar Raja to him. The story seems to have been inspired by the Hollywood film, The Sting. Deshmukh had planned to start the first schedule of the film early 2014 but since Hashmi's other film Badtameez Dil had been postponed, the start of the film's shoot was advanced to October 2013. Principal photography commenced on 20 October 2013. Hashmi took special dance training for the film under choreographer, Raju Khan.

== Soundtrack ==
The film's soundtrack was composed by noted Tamil film composer Yuvan Shankar Raja who made his debut in Hindi films with the film. The lyrics were written by Irshad Kamil. The soundtrack was released through Junglee Music on 30 July 2014 which coincided with its live airing at the Radio City station.

== Critical reception ==
The film received positive reviews upon release.

The Times of India gave 3.5 stars out of 5 and wrote, "With its twisting story, good-looking frames and zingy acting, Raja Natwarlal keeps you entertained". Rachel Saltz from The New York Times wrote, "Mr. Deshmukh's setup can be overly fussy – some of the con machinations seem needlessly complicated and hard to follow, or maybe not quite worth following – but his payoff works. And his cast, too, hits the right notes and finds an easy rhythm". Bollywood Hungama gave 3 stars out of 5 and wrote, "Kunal Deshmukh does a reasonably good job in Raja Natwarlal. There are a few repeated moments from his earlier films, but the plot of the film overshadows that. He manages to get the audiences glued to their seats throughout the film, a few loopholes notwithstanding".

Anupama Chopra from Hindustan Times gave a rating of 2.5 and wrote, "If you can get past the foolishness of the plot, director Kunal Deshmukh's film is mildly engaging". Raja Sen from Rediff gave the same rating, while writing, "Raja Natwarlal has some smarts but tragically lacks the skill or the sleight-of-hand". Kusumita Das from Deccan Chronicle gave 2.5 stars as well and wrote, "There's a gripping premise of a revenge plan, little bit of comedy, some interesting dialogues and convincing performances from the chief cast. But in a bid to broaden the suspense and make the twists more unpredictable, the story gets entwined in all the yarns it manages to spin for over two hours". Shubha Shetty-Saha from mid-day gave 2.5 stars out of 5, too, and wrote, "This film had huge potential but sadly one walks out of the theatre unimpressed by Raja Natwarlals antics and this film". Rahul Desai from Mumbai Mirror wrote, "This film is far from perfect, but makes for an acceptable non-Italian version of The Indian Job-by entertaining solely within the confines of a revenge drama". Sify wrote, "The film, with an impressive intermission point, is pacy and full of twists in the second half...Where the film falters is in insinuating incongruous melodrama and unnecessary characters".

Shubhra Gupta from Indian Express gave 1.5 stars out of 5 and wrote, "A caper flick necessarily has to do a couple of things: it has to have some surprises, and it has to be fun. On neither of these counts, Raja Natwarlal comes up trumps". The Economic Times reported, "With its many twists, the film actually has enough potential to stay gripping, but fails woefully at it as it gets a hackneyed treatment". Faheem Ruhani from India Today, gave the film one star and said, "Unfortunately for Emraan, there is very little in this film that is enthralling. In fact, this story...is nothing but plain boring and exhausting to sit through". Mihir Fadnavis from firstpost.com wrote, " Raja Natwarlal is a con film about con men, and it succeeds wonderfully in conning you into coming to see it. Raja Natwarlal is a Stupid Man's Ocean's 11". Sanjukta Sharma from livemint wrote, "You probably won't remember this film after you have watched it. There is no inventiveness in plot, treatment, and characterization—unlike the best con movies, not for a moment do any of the characters seem to be duping each other, and their wiles or avarice hold no surprises. Raja Natwarlal is unimaginative pulp; it begins and ends on a lukewarm note".

== Box office ==
The film's approximate opening day gross was ₹55 million (US$570,000) to ₹60 million (US$620,000), while ₹52.5 million (US$550,000) were reportedly collected on Saturday; the overall weekend gross was ₹170 million (US$1.8 million). At the end of the first week, the film had collected ₹259 million (US$2.7 million) and the overall lifetime collection were ₹268 million (US$2.8 million) according to Bollywood Hungama.
