= Karachi, You're Killing Me! =

2014 novel by Saba Imtiaz

- Paperback cover
- Author: Saba Imtiaz
- Language: English
- Genre: Comedy, crime
- Publisher: Random House India
- Publication date: 1 February 2014
- Publication place: Pakistan
- Media type: Paperback
- Pages: 272
- ISBN: 978-8184004601

Karachi, You're Killing Me! is a 2014 comedy crime-thriller novel by the Pakistani journalist-writer Saba Imtiaz. The author's debut novel was released in paperback by India's Random House on 1 February 2014. It is written about a 20-year-old reporter, Ayesha Khan, living in one of the world's most beautiful cities, Karachi, about her misadventures and finding a nice lover. The novel received mostly positive feedback from the reviewers. Imtiaz describes the novel as "Bridget Jones's Diary" meets "The Diary of a Social Butterfly." In 2015, the novel was optioned by producer Vikram Malhotra for a Bollywood film adaptation.

== Plot ==
Ayesha Khan, a journalist in her twenties living in one of the world's most lively cities, Karachi, whose work is to show up at bomb sites and picks her way through scattered body parts. Ayesha is hopeless in finding a nice guy like her old friend Saad, to share her personal thoughts with. Other than that, her most basic problem is how to straighten her hair.

== Critical reception ==
Karachi, You're Killing Me! has received critical acclaim. In a review for The Denver Post (AP), Rebecca Santana wrote that the novel successfully dismantles Pakistani stereotypes without moralizing. Santana praised the author's complex and tenacious depiction of the protagonist, unlike Bridget Jones and traditional portrayals of Pakistani women. Somak Ghoshal wrote for the Mint that "the satire is pitch perfect and may hit those of us who live in the subcontinent harder than the rest" and that the "refreshingly devoid of glosses and translations, Imtiaz's novel is unapologetically faithful to the cultural nuances from which it emerges." In the Hindustan Times review by Manjula Narayan was also positive, stating that "a comedy of manners, an incisive look at the journalistic life, an examination of a city with a dangerous edge, and an attempt to stand chicklit on its head, Karachi, You're Killing Me! is, quite simply, a very good read."

Ghausia Rashid Salam of The Missing Slate praised the author and novel and called it a "pretty fantastic" debut novel. Nudrat Kamal wrote for the Newsline and stated that the "humour is the greatest strength of the novel." The Friday Times Mohsin Sidiqui praised the author and the novel, and stated that "Ms. Imtiaz has managed to pull together a novel that you want to read and share with people, not because of a misplaced sense of "Oh crap, it's another Pakistani writer, I suppose I have to be mildly positive," but instead because it's actually laugh-out-loud funny, witty, and entertaining."

== Film adaptation ==
On 9 April 2014, India's Abundantia Entertainment acquired the Bollywood film adaptation rights to the novel. The film would be named Noor which would star Sonakshi Sinha as a female lead and Vikram Malhotra would produce. Author Saba Imtiaz would also be involved in developing the screenplay.
