= Humaima Malick =

Pakistani actress and model (born 1987)

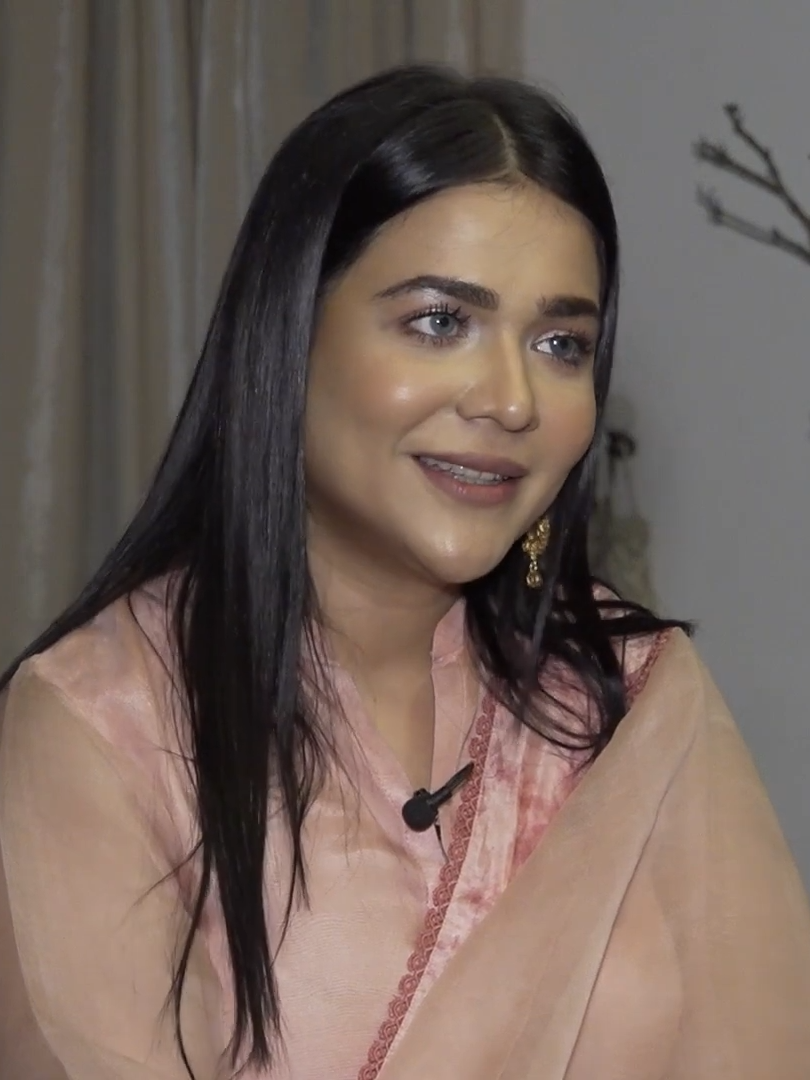
- Malick in 2023
- Born: 18 November 1987 (age 38); Quetta, Balochistan, Pakistan
- Occupations: Model, actress
- Years active: 2009 – present
- Spouse: Shamoon Abbasi (m. 2009; div. 2010)
- Relatives: Feroze Khan (brother); Dua Malik (sister); Sohail Haider (brother-in-law)

Humaima Malick (born 18 November 1987) is a Pakistani actress who works in Pakistani films and serials. She is known for Ishq Junoon Deewangi as Pares Usmani and social-drama Bol in 2011.

== Personal life ==
Malick was born in Quetta in the Balochistan province of Pakistan to a Pashtun father, and a Punjabi mother. She graduated from Government Girls College Quetta and then moved to Karachi along with her family following her father's retirement. Malick has one brother, Feroze Khan, and one sister, Dua Malik. Singer Sohail Haider is her brother-in-law. Malick was previously married to Shamoon Abbasi.

== Career ==
=== Early work (2009–2011) ===
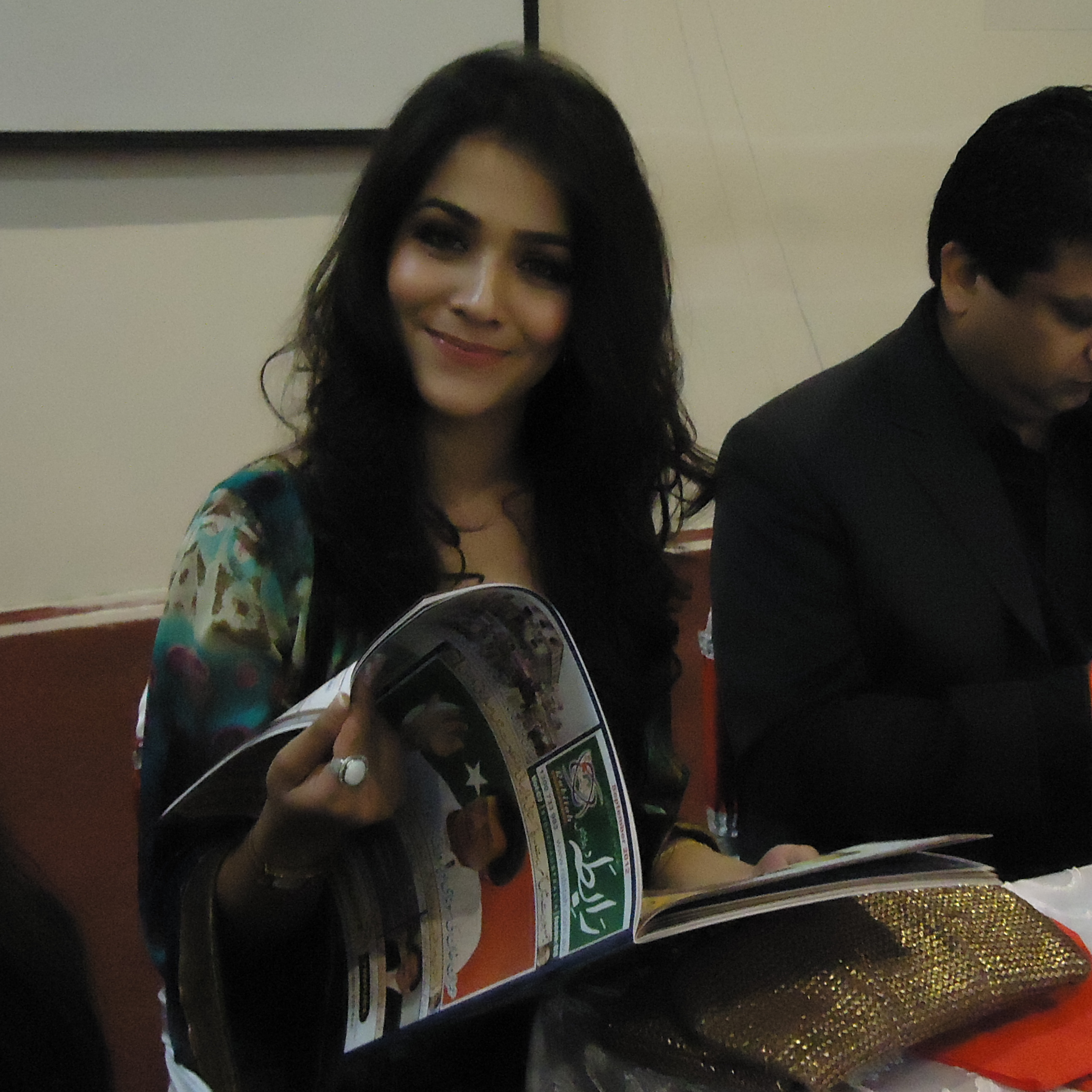
Malick in 2012

Malick started her career as a model at the age of fourteen, through a Unilever Pakistan campaign. It was at the same age that she first walked the ramp, for fashion designer Deepak Perwani. Since then she has appeared in fashion shows for numerous designers.

Malick made her acting debut with the serial Ishq Junoon Deewangi. She then appeared in Barish Kay Ansoo, Tanveer Fatima (B.A), Talluq, and Akbari Asghari.

=== Film career ===
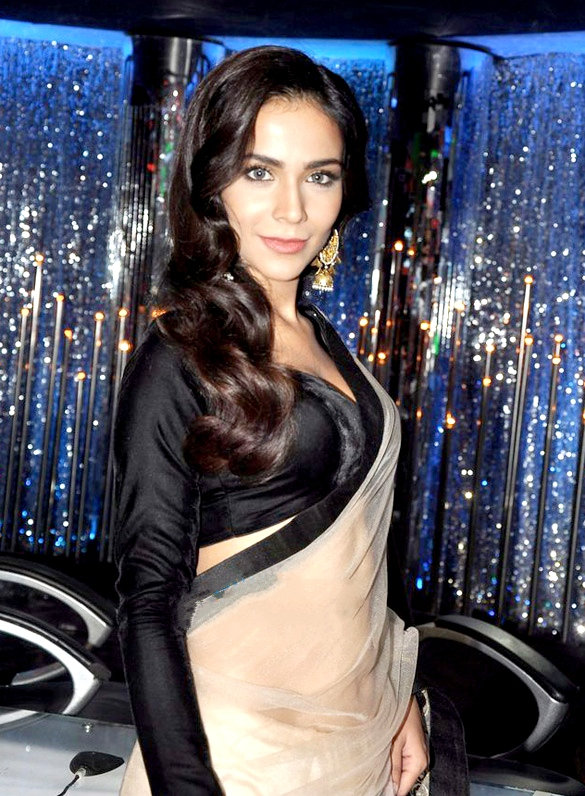
Malick promotes Raja Natwarlal in 2014

Malick made her film debut in Shoaib Mansoor's Bol. In 2012, she appeared in Shehzad Rafique's Ishq Khuda. In 2014, she starred in Kunal Deshmukh's Raja Natwarlal opposite Emraan Hashmi, which was her debut film in Bollywood. She then starred in Asad Ul Haq's Dekh Magar Pyaar Say, alongside Sikander Rizvi.

In 2017, she played the role of a film star in Pakistani film Arth 2, co-starred and directed by Shaan Shahid.

Malick appeared in Bilal Lashari's action-drama The Legend of Maula Jatt.

== Filmography ==
=== Films ===
Key
†	Denotes films that have not yet been released

- All films are in Urdu unless otherwise noted.

Year	Title	Role	Notes	Ref
2011	Bol	Zainab		
2013	Ishq Khuda	Rabia	Cameo appearance	
2014	Raja Natwarlal	Ziya	Hindi	
2015	Dekh Magar Pyaar Say	Annie		
2017	Arth - The Destination	Umaima		
2022	The Legend of Maula Jatt	Daro Nattni		

=== Television ===
Year	Title	Role	Notes
2010	Talluq		
2008	Mili Ali Ko Mili	Mili	
2009	Ishq Junoon Deewangi	Pares Usmani	
2009	Barish Kay Aansoo		
2009	Tanveer Fatima (B.A)	Fatima	
2011	Akbari Asghari	Asghari	
2023	Jindo	Jindo	

== Awards and nominations ==
Year	Award	Category	Work	Result	Ref.
2012	Lux Style Awards	Best Film Actress	Bol	Won	
2012	Asia Pacific Screen Awards	Best Performance by an Actress	Bol	Nominated	
2012	London Asian Film Festival	Best Film Actress	Bol	Won	
2012	Pakistan Media Awards	Best Actress	Bol	Won	
2018	Lux Style Awards	Best Supporting Actress in a Film	Arth - The Destination	Nominated	

== See also ==
- List of Pakistani models
- List of Pakistani actresses
