= Dekh Magar Pyaar Say =

- Theatrical release poster
- دیکھ مگر پیار سے
- Directed by: Asad Ul Haq; Simon Okeke
- Written by: Saba Imtiaz
- Produced by: Ali Murtuza
- Starring: Humaima Malick; Sikander Rizvi; Irfan Khoosat; Amna Ilyas
- Cinematography: Nic Knowland BSC
- Edited by: Eng Yong Teh
- Music by: Background score: Abbas Ali Khan; Songs: Mooroo
- Production company: Shiny Toy Guns
- Distributed by: HKC Entertainment
- Release date: 14 August 2015
- Running time: 107 min
- Country: Pakistan
- Language: Urdu

Dekh Magar Pyaar Say is a 2015 Pakistani romantic comedy film directed by Asad ul Haq and produced by Ali Murtaza under the production banner Shiny Toy Guns. The film was the directorial debut for Haq. The movie starred Humaima Malick and Sikander Rizvi in the lead roles. The latter made his film debut with the movie.

Dekh Magar Pyar Se received positive reviews for good direction, acting and its music. The cinematography was especially lauded as it showcased the beauty of Lahore.

== Cast ==
- Humaima Malick as Annie
- Sikander Rizvi as Sikandar
- Irfan Khoosat
- Amna Ilyas - Special appearance in song "Kaala Doriya"

== Production ==
The film was produced, financed and developed by Shiny Toy Guns. The styling for the movie was done by Saima Rashid Bargfrede. Shehryar Yasin was hired as the Creative and Fashion Design Director for the movie.

=== Casting ===
On 2 April 2015 Humaima Malick and Sikander Rizvi were confirmed as the lead actors. Amna Ilyas was cast for an item song "Kaala Doriya".

=== Filming ===
The film was mostly shot in Lahore over a 45-day period with filming wrapping up in the week of 18 May. The cast and crew were spotted in London shooting scenes for the movie. The cast and crew were reportedly filming bonus footage for the movie in London.

=== Marketing ===
On 2 April 2015 the first teaser poster for the movie was released. Motion poster was revealed on 2 June. The teaser trailer for the movie was released on 1 July via the movie's official Facebook page. To promote the movie, fans were given the opportunity to view the filming of the bonus footage being shot in London via the Periscope app. The movie was also promoted using the hashtag "magarpyaarsay". The theatrical trailer was revealed online on 12 July 2015.

== Soundtrack ==
The background score of the film was given by Abbas Ali Khan.

No.	Title	Length
1.	"Kaala Dooriya"	02:40
2.	"Tumhein Dillagi (Band Version)"
3.	"Tumhein Dillagi (Film Version)"
4.	"Neray Neray Vas"
5.	"Kabhi Kabhi"
6.	"Tasveer"
7.	"Tauba Tauba"
8.	"Dekh Magar Pyar Say (Title Track)"

== Reception ==
Dekh Magar Pyar Se received positive reviews with good directing and acting while praising its music.
