= Feroz Nizami =

Pakistani film score composer (1910-1975)

- Ferozuddin Ahmad a.k.a. Feroz Nizami

Background information
- Also known as: Feroz Nizami
- Born: Ferozuddin Ahmad; 10 November 1910; Lahore, British India (present-day Lahore, Pakistan)
- Origin: Punjab
- Died: 15 November 1975 (aged 65) Lahore, Punjab, Pakistan
- Occupations: Composer; Classical singer; Music director
- Years active: 1943 – 1975

Feroz Nizami (born Ferozuddin Ahmad; 10 November 1910 – 15 November 1975) was a Pakistani film score composer, music director and classical singer.

He composed music for Bollywood films in British India and after partition, he remained actively involved in Pakistan film industry. He is primarily recognized as a music composer for a music blockbuster Indian film Jugnu (1947), which helped him to appear among the prominent composers in both India and Pakistan cinemas. His last composition in Bombay films was released in 1947, leading him to retain his position for more than twenty years in South Asia's music industry during the 1940s.

Before he returned to Pakistan while working in Indian films, he was referred to as "Ustad of Bombay" by the Indian artists such as Lata Mangeshkar, Mohammed Rafi, and Dilip Kumar.

During his last days, he extensively researched music and wrote books on the musical subject such as Ramooz e Moseeqi and Israr e Moseeqi, and an autobiographical book titled Sarchashma e Hayat, comprising a detailed account of his life. He is also credited for introducing the greatest Indian singer Mohammed Rafi to the Indian film industry.

== Early life and education ==
He was born on 10 November 1910 in British India (in modern-day Lahore, Pakistan). Feroz Nizami received his education from the Government Islamia College, and later graduated from a government Islamia College, Lahore. He also studied Sufism and Metaphysics. He was the brother of a Pakistani cricketer Nazar Mohammad and writer Siraj Nizami. He was married to an Indian-born woman Ghulam Fatima. In 2016, his wife argued that she submitted multiple requests to the government of Pakistan, including provincial government of Punjab for financial assistance, she according to The Express Tribune is living in one rental room in Jogi Mohalla area of Bhatti Chowk, Lahore, and was not assisted by the authorities. Following the claimed difficult circumstances, she is believed to return her hometown Bhendi Bazaar, India.

Feroz Nizami was originally working as a singer at a state-owned radio station at Lahore and was later transferred to the All India Radio and eventually at Delhi and later in Lucknow until he went to Bombay (now Mumbai) in search of career opportunities in bollywood. While working at the radio station, he had the opportunity to work with such people as Saadat Hasan Manto, Krishan Chander and another music director Khwaja Khurshid Anwar.

== Career ==
Prior to his debut in Urdu and Hindi films, Feroz received his training in classical music from the classical music teacher Ustad Abdul Wahid Khan of the Kirana gharana. After completing his training, he left midway working for the All India Radio and went to Bombay's Bollywood film industry. He composed different types of music throughout his career, and used classical, semi-classical, thumris and western music in India (before partition) and in Pakistan (after partition). He originally started his career in 1943 with the film Vishwas, in which he worked with Chhelalal, Indian music director. He then composed music in 1946 for Neik Parveen, a flop film of that time, but some of its compositions were good. Later in 1947, Noor Jehan and her husband Shaukat Hussain Rizvi's production company Shaukat Art Productions (SAP) in Bombay (now Mumbai) recruited him to score the music for SAP's first film Jugnu, a music blockbuster film of 1940s.

After the partition, he moved back to Lahore and started working as a music director in Pakistani film industry with his first film Hamri Basti (1949), which did not do well at the box office. However, four years later when Noor Jehan produced the Pakistani film Chann Wey, his compositions for the film were praised in the Indian subcontinent. In 1952, he scored music for Dopatta, the only high-grossing Pakistani film of the early 1950s.

=== Later work ===
During the late 1950s, he used to teach classical music at the Alhamra Arts Council in Lahore, Pakistan.

== Filmography ==
Key
†	Denotes films that have not yet been released

#	Title	Year	Music Director	Producer	Screenwriter	Music Composer
1	Vishwas	1943				Yes
2	Uss Paar	1944				Yes
3	Umang	1944				Yes
4	Badi Baat	1944				Yes
5	Sharbati Aankhen	1945				Yes
6	Piya Milan	1945				Yes
7	Amar Raj	1946				Yes
8	Nek Pervin	1946				Yes
9	Jugnu	1947	Yes			Yes
10	Rangeen Kahani	1947				Yes
11	Hamari Basti	1950				Yes
12	Chanway	1951				Yes
13	Dupatta	1952	Yes			Yes
14	Sharare	1955				Yes
15	Sohni	1955				Yes
16	Intikhab	1955				Yes
17	Kismet	1956				Yes
18	Sola Anne	1959				Yes
19	Raaz	1959				Yes
20	Zanjeer	1960				Yes
21	Manzil	1960				Yes
22	Mongol	1961				Yes
23	Saukan	1965				Yes
24	Gulshan	1974				Yes
25	Sangeet	1974				Yes
26	Zar Zan Zameen	1974				Yes

== Literary work ==
In addition to composing music, he also wrote books on art and music, including English-language books entitled ABC of Music and History and Development of Music, the only writings on the subject that were first written after the country became a sovereign state. In the later years, he wrote more books on the subject such as Ramooz-e-Moseeqi and Israr-e-Moseeqi. A book he wrote on spiritualism was Sarchashma e Hayat, comprising his autobiography.

== Death ==
Feroze Nizami died on 15 November 1975 in Lahore, Pakistan. His death anniversary is observed by the Pakistanis every year, particularly in Lahore.

== Bibliography ==
- Nizami, Feroze (1988). History and Development of Music. Punjab Council of the Arts. p. 151.
- Nizami, Feroze (1988). ABC of Music. Punjab Council of the Arts. p. 142.
- Nizami, Feroze (1988). Asrār-i mūsīqī. Niẓāmī Pablīkeshanz. p. 196.
