= Shaukat Hussain Rizvi =

Pakistani film producer and director (1914-1999)

- Born: 1914; Azamgarh, United Provinces of Agra and Oudh, British India
- Died: 19 August 1999 (aged 84–85); Lahore, Punjab, Pakistan
- Occupations: Film director, film producer and cinematographer
- Spouses: Noor Jehan (m. 1942; div. 1953): Yasmin
- Children: Zil-e-Huma (daughter); Akbar Rizvi (son); Asghar Rizvi (son)
- Relatives: Sonya Jehan (Granddaughter); Sikander Rizvi (Grandson); Ahmad Ali Butt (Grandson)

Syed Shaukat Hussain Rizvi (1914 – 19 August 1999) was a Pakistani actor, film producer and director. He is widely considered to be a pioneer of the Pakistani film industry.

== Early life and career ==
Shaukat Hussain Rizvi was born in the city of Azamgarh, Uttar Pradesh in 1914. He began his career as an assistant projectionist in Calcutta in the early 1930s. Then he was given a job in the editing department of Madan Theatres. By 1942, Rizvi was promoted to a film director and was assigned by the producer Dalsukh M. Pancholi to direct a film named Khandan (1942) starring Pran and Noor Jehan in the lead roles.

The script of this film was written by Imtiaz Ali Taj. After the huge success of this film, Shaukat Hussain Rizvi married Noor Jehan in 1944. Their marriage produced three children: sons Akbar Hussain Rizvi, and Asghar Hussain Rizvi, and a daughter, Zil-e-Huma.

After the independence of Pakistan in 1947, Rizvi, Noor Jehan and their three children moved to Pakistan and later made several films in Pakistan. His marriage to Jehan ended in a divorce in 1953. He later married a Pakistani actress Yasmin. He had two children with Yasmin: Shehnshah Hussain Rizvi and Ali Hussain Rizvi.

== Death and legacy ==
Shaukat Hussain Rizvi died on 19 August 1999 at Lahore, Pakistan at age 85. Pakistani actors Sonya Jehan, and Sikander Rizvi are his grandchildren.

== Filmography ==
His notable works include:

=== Director ===
- Khandaan (1942)
- Naukar (1943)
- Dost (1944)
- Zeenat (1945)
- Jugnu (1947)
- Chanway (1951) (a Punjabi language Pakistani film)
- Gulnar (1953)
- Jaan-e-Bahar (1958)
