= Jugnu (1947 film) =

1947 film

- Theatrical release poster
- Directed by: Shaukat Hussain Rizvi
- Written by: A. S. Usmani
- Screenplay by: Khadim Mohyuddin
- Story by: A. S. Usmani
- Produced by: Shaukat Hussain Rizvi
- Starring: Dilip Kumar; Noor Jehan
- Cinematography: P. Issac
- Edited by: Mohsin T. Bangriwala
- Music by: Feroz Nizami
- Production company: Shaukat Art Productions
- Distributed by: Shaukat Art Productions
- Release date: 23 May 1947
- Country: India
- Language: Hindustani

Jugnu (transl. Firefly) is a 1947 Indian musical romantic comedy film directed and produced by Shaukat Hussain Rizvi. The film stars Dilip Kumar and Noor Jehan in lead roles with Ghulam Mohammad, Jillo, Latika, and Shashikala in supporting roles. It also features a cameo appearance by Mohammed Rafi. It revolves around Suraj, the son of a rich landlord, and Jugnu, an orphan, who fall in love with each other.

Jugnu was released on 23 May 1947 and faced controversies because of its way of depicting romance. The elitarian society including film critics even demanded the film to be banned. Despite these protests, the film was praised for its actors' performances, and became a major commercial success, becoming the highest-grossing Indian film of 1947. (Note: ₹50 lakh (US$5 million) (Note: 1 Indian rupee per US dollar in 1947) in 1947 (equivalent to US$72 million or ₹363 crore in 2016)) The film was Dilip Kumar's first major hit and marked the beginning of his stardom.

== Cast ==
Male

- Dilip Kumar as Suraj
- Zia
- Laddan
- Sanger
- Agha
- Nazir Kashmiri
- Munawwar Agha Najni
- Ghulam Mohamad as Sooraj's father

Female

- Noor Jehan as Jugnu
- Latika as Jugnu's friend
- Parveen
- Shashikala as Suraj's sister
- Farha
- Indoo
- Hoorbanoo
- Jilloo bai as Suraj's mother

== Music ==
No.	Title	Singer(s)	Length
1.	"Yahaan Badala Wafa Ka Bewafai Ke Siwa Kya Hai"	Noor Jehan, Mohammed Rafi	04:47
2.	"Woh Apani Yaad Dilaane Ko"	Mohammed Rafi	03:14
3.	"Aaj Ki Raat Saaz-E-Dil-E-Purdard Na Chheirr"	Noor Jehan	04:43
4.	"Hamein To Sham-E-Gham Mein Katni Hai Zindagi Apni"	Noor Jehan	04:04
5.	"Umangein Dil Ki Machleen Muskarai Zindagi Apni"	Noor Jehan	03:49
6.	"Desh Ki Purkaif Rangi Si Fizaon Mein Kahi"	Roshan Ara Begum	04:48
7.	"Tum Bhi Bhula Do Mein Bhi Bhula Dun"	Noor Jehan	03:47
8.	"Laut Jawaani Phir Nahin Aani"	Shamshad Begum	05:55
Total length:			35:07

== Release ==
Jugnu was released on 23 May 1947. The film was conceptualized and filmed in pre-independence India however, the film's censored version was subsequently released after the partition. The film drew significant controversy upon release, for two major reasons. The first reason was its depiction of romance, flirting and dancing on a college campus setting, which led to negative reviews from film critics. This led to 28 minutes of content being censored by the Indian government. The second reason was the film's director Rizvi and lead actress Noor Jehan becoming Pakistanis after the partition of India.

=== Critical reception ===
In 1948, the biggest Indian film magazine at the time, Filmindia, was very critical of the film. The magazine's editor, film critic Baburao Patel, wrote a negative review, calling Jugnu a "dirty, disgusting, vulgar picture!" Patel stated, it "tells us that college life in India is nothing more than a long sex hunt in which boys chase girls, explore their hand bags, rob their tiffin boxes and sing suggestive love ditties while making vulgar gestures; while girls sigh about heavily, seduce boys to tea, pimp for their friends, puncture their cycle tyres and sing songs of frustrated love," and added, "no decent exhibitor with any pride for his profession or any self-respect should exhibit it in his theatre." He also criticized the director Rizvi for becoming a Pakistani national, falsely accusing him of having connections with Hyderabad State separatist Kasim Razvi. Another 1948 Filmindia editorial attacked Muslim filmmakers such as Rizvi for working in both India and Pakistan, stating "censors must watch carefully such anti-social and anti-religious activities of these fanatic producers who live with us to stab us from day to day," while referencing Jugnu as an example.

=== Box office ===
Jugnu (1947 film) grossed ₹50 lakh (US$5 million) in India, making it the highest-grossing Indian film of 1947. When adjusted for inflation, its gross in 2016 value is equivalent to ₹363 crore (US$72 million). This is the highest for any Indian film at the time, until it was surpassed by Andaz, which also stars Kumar in lead role along with Nargis and Raj Kapoor.
