= Ahmad Ali Butt =

Ahmed Ali Butt
- احمد علی بٹ
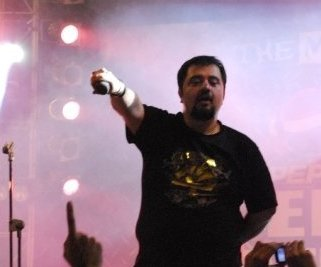
- Ahmad Ali Butt in 2009
- Born: 6 March 1976 (age 49); Karachi, Pakistan
- Occupations: Actor; Comedian; Singer-songwriter
- Years active: 2001–Present
- Spouse: Fatima Khan (m. 2013)
- Mother: Zil-e-Huma
- Relatives: Shaukat Hussain Rizvi (maternal grandfather); Noor Jehan (maternal grandmother)
- Musical career
- Genres: Hip hop; Rap
- Instruments: Vocals; Keyboard
- Formerly of: Entity Paradigm

Ahmad Ali Butt (Urdu: احمد علی بٹ, born 6 March 1976) is a Pakistani actor, comedian, keyboardist, rapper, singer-songwriter, voice actor and television host.

== Early life and family background ==
Ahmad Ali Butt was born on 6 March 1976 in Karachi into a family of Kashmiri ancestry.

He is a maternal grandson of the Azamgarh-born film director Shaukat Hussain Rizvi and actress and playback singer Noor Jehan, and son of the late singer Zil-e-Huma.

His father, Raheel Butt, was a jeweller well known in Lahore's ethnic Kashmiri community. Under the name Aqeel, he was also an actor, playing supporting roles in movies in the 1960s and the 1970s, such as Heer Ranjha (1970).

Ahmad has three brothers.

Butt is married to model Fatima Khan. They had a son in 2014.

== Career ==
=== Actor ===
Butt began his career as an actor with theatre. He later switched to television, appearing in the sitcoms Jutt & Bond, Rubber Band and Inspector Khoji. He would later star in films. He has also pursued a career as a comedian.

=== Musician ===
Butt began his career in music with the alternative rock band Entity Paradigm (EP) as a vocalist and rapper, starting EP with his Jutt & Bond co-actor Fawad Khan.

== Filmography ==
=== Television serials ===
Year	Title	Role	Director	Network	Notes
2001–2004	Jutt & Bond	Jutt		Indus TV	
2005–2008	Rubber Band	Ahmad	Yes	ARY Digital	
2006	Inspector Khoji	Inspector Khoji		PTV	
2014–2017	Mr. Shamim	Mr. James Shamim		Hum TV	
2020	Jhooti	Nasir		ARY Digital	
2024	Gentleman	Dilbar		Green Entertainment	

=== Films ===
Key
†	Denotes film or TV productions that have not yet been released

Year	Films	Role	Notes
2015	Jawani Phir Nahi Ani	Parvez / Pipi	Debut film
2015	Commander Safeguard	Dirtoo	Voiceover; animation film
2016	Dulha Mil Giya	Imran Ahmad	Telefilm on Hum TV
2016	3 Bahadur: The Revenge of Baba Balaam	Gola	Voiceover; animation film
2017	Punjab Nahi Jaungi	Shafique Ahmad	
2018	Jawani Phir Nahi Ani 2	Parvez / Pipi	
2019	Parey Hut Love	Arshad	
2023	Gunjal	Salman Habib	
2025	Love Guru	Ali Ahmed	

== Awards and nominations ==
Year	Ceremony	Category	Project	Result	Ref
2015	15th Lux Style Awards	Best Supporting Actor in a Film	Jawani Phir Nahi Ani	Nominated	
2019	18th Lux Style Awards	Best Film Actor	Jawani Phir Nahi Ani 2	Nominated	
