= Noor Jehan =

Pakistani singer and actress (1926–2000)

Noor Jehan PP TI SI
- نور جہاں
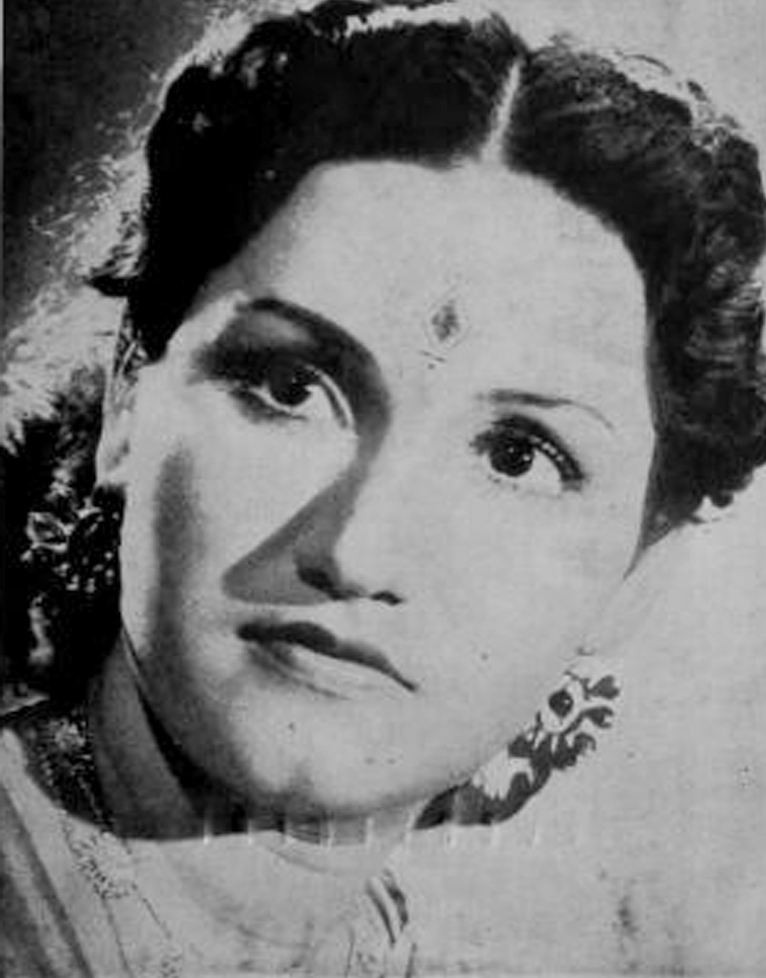
- Noor Jehan in the film Humjoli, c. 1946
- Born: Allah Wasai; 21 September 1926; Kasur, Punjab Province, British India
- Died: 23 December 2000 (aged 74); Karachi, Sindh, Pakistan
- Resting place: Gizri Graveyard, Karachi
- Other names: The Nightingale of The East; Queen of Hearts; Daughter of Nation; The Nightingale of Punjab
- Occupations: Playback Singer; Music Composer; Actress; Director
- Years active: 1930 – 2000
- Notable work: Zeenat (1945); Anmol Ghadi (1946); Jugnu (1947); Mirza Sahiban (1947); Chan Wey (1951); Dupatta (1952); Intezar (1956); Anarkali (1958); Koel (1959)
- Style: Filmi; Ghazal; Classical music; Qawwali
- Title: "Malika-e-Tarannum" (Queen of Melody)
- Spouses: Shaukat Hussain Rizvi (m. 1941; div. 1953) Ejaz Durrani (m. 1959; div. 1971)
- Children: 6, including Zil-e-Huma, Nazia Ejaz Khan
- Relatives: Sonya Jehan (granddaughter); Sikander Rizvi (grandson); Ahmad Ali Butt (grandson)
- Awards: 15 Nigar Awards
- Honours: Pride of Performance (1965); Tamgha-e-Imtiaz (1965); Sitara-e-Imtiaz (1996)

Noor Jehan (Note: Also spelled Noorjehan; born Allah Rakhi Wasai; Punjabi, Urdu: اللہ رکھی وسائی) (21 September 1926 – 23 December 2000) was a Pakistani playback singer and actress. Her six-decade career spanned both British Indian and Pakistani cinema. Jehan had proficiency in Hindustani classical music, as well as in other genres including ghazals. She made her directorial debut with the film Chann Wey in 1951, becoming the first female film director in Pakistan. She is recognized for her contributions to music in South Asia, particularly in Pakistan. She was given the title of Malika-e-Tarannum ("Queen of Melody") in Pakistan.

Along with Ahmed Rushdi, she holds the record for having given voice to the largest number of film songs in the history of Pakistani cinema. She recorded about 10,000 songs in various languages, including Urdu, Punjabi, and Sindhi. She sang a total of 2,422 songs in 1,148 Pakistani films during a career that lasted more than half a century.

== Early life ==
Noor Jehan was born as Allah Wasai on 21 September 1926 into a Punjabi Muslim family in Kot Murad Khan, near Kasur, Punjab, British India. She was born into a family of classical musicians. Noor Jehan's grandmother Amma Hasso was a famous singer and beloved by the public for her charitable work. Her father was the musician and singer Imdad Ali, her mother was tawaif Fateh Bibi. One of her aunts was also a singer. She was the youngest child born to her parents.

== Career ==
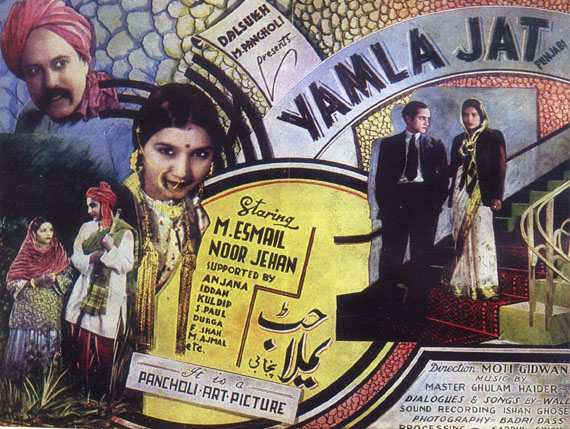
Poster of Yamla Jatt (1940) Noor Jehan, M. Ismail, Pran

=== Career in British India ===
Noor Jehan began to sing at the age of five and showed a keen interest in a range of styles, including traditional folk and popular theatre. Realising her potential for singing, her parents sent her to receive early training in classical singing under Ustad Ghulam Mohammad. Noor Jehan's mother arranged for her to receive musical training under famous classical singer Kajjanbai. Kajjanbai had her receive 12 hours of "riyaz" every day, she also had a teacher who taught her literature lessons every day. She started her training at age 11 in Calcutta, where ustads instructed her in the traditions of the Patiala Gharana of Hindustani classical music and the classical forms of thumri, dhrupad, and khyal.

As a child, Noor Jehan and her two sisters performed on stage in a rural theater troupe called "Taka Theater".At the age of nine, she drew the attention of Punjabi musician Ghulam Ahmed Chishti, who would later introduce her to the stage in Lahore. He composed some ghazals, na`ats, and folk songs for her to perform, although she was keener on breaking into acting or playback singing. Once her vocational training finished, Jehan pursued a career in singing alongside her sister in Lahore, and would usually take part in the live song and dance performances prior to screenings of films in cinemas.

Theatre owner Diwan Sardari Lal took the small girl to Calcutta in the early 1930s, and the entire family moved to Calcutta in hopes of developing the movie careers of Allah Wasai and her older sisters, Eiden Bai and Haider Bandi. Mukhtar Begum (not to be confused with actress Sabiha Khanum) encouraged the sisters to join film companies and recommended them to various producers. She also recommended them to her husband, Agha Hashar Kashmiri, who owned a maidan theatre (a tented theatre to accommodate large audiences). It was here that Wasai received the stage name, Baby Noor Jehan. Her older sisters were offered jobs with one of the Seth Sukh Karnani companies, Indira Movietone, and they went on to be known as the Punjab Mail.

In 1935, K.D. Mehra directed the Punjabi movie Pind di Kuri, in which Noor Jehan acted along with her sisters and sang the Punjabi song "Langh aja patan chanaan da o yaar," which became her earliest hit. She then acted in a film called Missar Ka Sitara (1936) by the same company and sang in it for music composer Damodar Sharma. Jehan also played the child role of Heer in the 1937 film Heer-Sayyal. One of her popular songs from that period, "Shala Jawaniyan Maney" is from Dalsukh Pancholi's Punjabi film Gul Bakawli (1939). All these Punjabi movies were made in Calcutta. After a few years in Calcutta, Jehan returned to Lahore in 1938. In 1939, renowned music director Ghulam Haider composed songs for Jehan which led to her early popularity, and he thus became her early mentor.

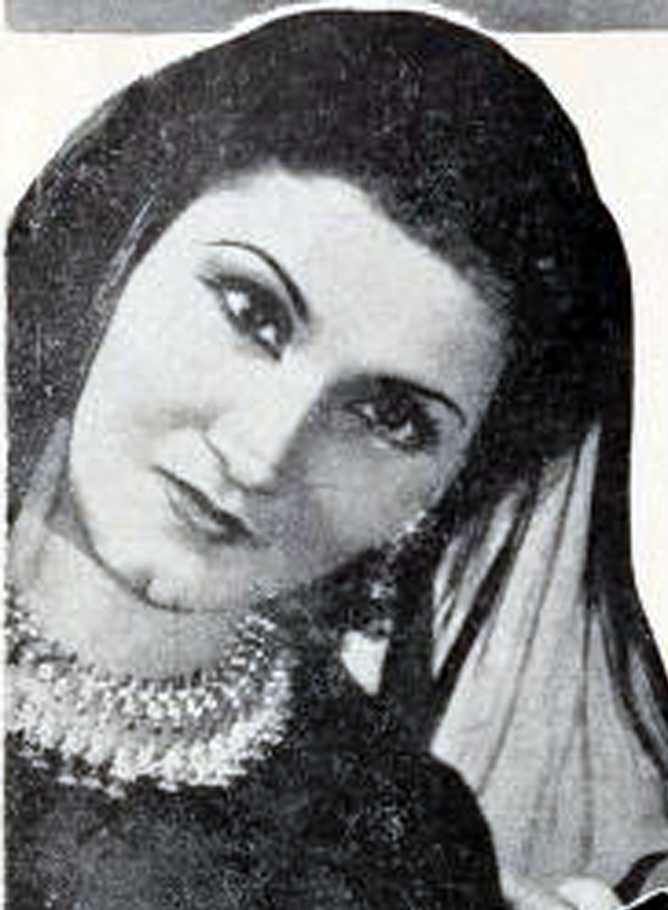
Jehan in the 1945 film Zeenat

In 1942, she played the main lead opposite Pran in Khandaan (1942). It was her first role as an adult, and the film was a major success. The success of Khandaan saw her shifting to Bombay, with the director Syed Shaukat Hussain Rizvi. She shared melodies with Shanta Apte in Duhai (1943). It was in this film that Jehan lent her voice for the second time, to another actress named Husn Bano. She married Rizvi later the same year. From 1945 to 1947 and her subsequent move to Pakistan, Noor Jehan was one of the biggest film actresses of the Indian Film Industry. Her films: Badi Maa, Zeenat, Gaon Ki Gori (all 1945), Anmol Ghadi (1946), Mirza Sahiban (1947) and Jugnu (1947) were the top-grossing films of the years 1945 to 1947. Mirza Sahiban was her last film released in India in which she was paired opposite Trilok Kapoor, brother of Prithviraj Kapoor. Alongside Suraiya, she was the biggest star in the country before Independence.

=== Acting career in Pakistan ===
In 1947, Rizvi and Jehan decided to move to Pakistan, upon the independence of the British Indian Empire, and had resulted in partition of India. They left Bombay and settled in Karachi with their family.

Three years after settling in Pakistan, Jehan starred in her first Pakistani film Chan Wey (1951), opposite Santosh Kumar, which was also her first Pakistani film as a heroine and playback singer. Shaukat Hussain Rizvi and Noor Jehan directed this film together, making Jehan Pakistan's first female director. It became the highest-grossing film in Pakistan in 1951. Jehan's second film in Pakistan was Dupatta (1952) which was produced by Aslam Lodhi, directed by Sibtain Fazli and assisted by A. H. Rana as production manager. Dupatta turned out to be an even bigger success than Chan Wey (1951). Indian director Aspi Irani offered Jehan the titular female lead role in his production Shirin Farhad (1956), which she declined due to scheduling conflicts; eventually Madhubala was cast in the role.

During 1953 and 1954, Jehan and Rizvi had problems and got divorced due to personal differences. She kept custody of the three children from their marriage. In 1959, she married another film actor, Ejaz Durrani, nine years her junior. Durrani pressured her to give up acting, and her last film as an actress/singer was Ghalib (1961). This contributed to the strengthening of her iconic stature. She gained another audience for herself. Her rendition of Faiz Ahmed Faiz's "Mujhse Pehli Si Mohabbat Mere Mehboob Na Maang" is a unique example of tarranum, reciting poetry as a song with music of Rasheed Attre in the Pakistani film Qaidi (1962). Jehan last acted in Baaji in 1963, though not in a leading role.

Jehan bade farewell to film acting in 1963 after a career of 33 years (1930–1963). The pressure of being a mother of six children and the demands of being a wife to another fellow film actor, forced her to give up her career. Jehan made 14 films in Pakistan, ten in Urdu and four in Punjabi as a film actress.

=== As playback singer ===
After quitting acting she took up playback singing. She made her debut exclusively as a playback singer in 1960 with the film Salma. Her first initial playback singing for a Pakistani film was for the 1951 film Chann Wey, for which she was the film director herself. She received many awards, including the Pride of Performance in 1965 by the Pakistani Government. She sang a large number of duets with Ahmed Rushdi, Mehdi Hassan, Masood Rana, Nusrat Fateh Ali Khan and Mujeeb Aalam.

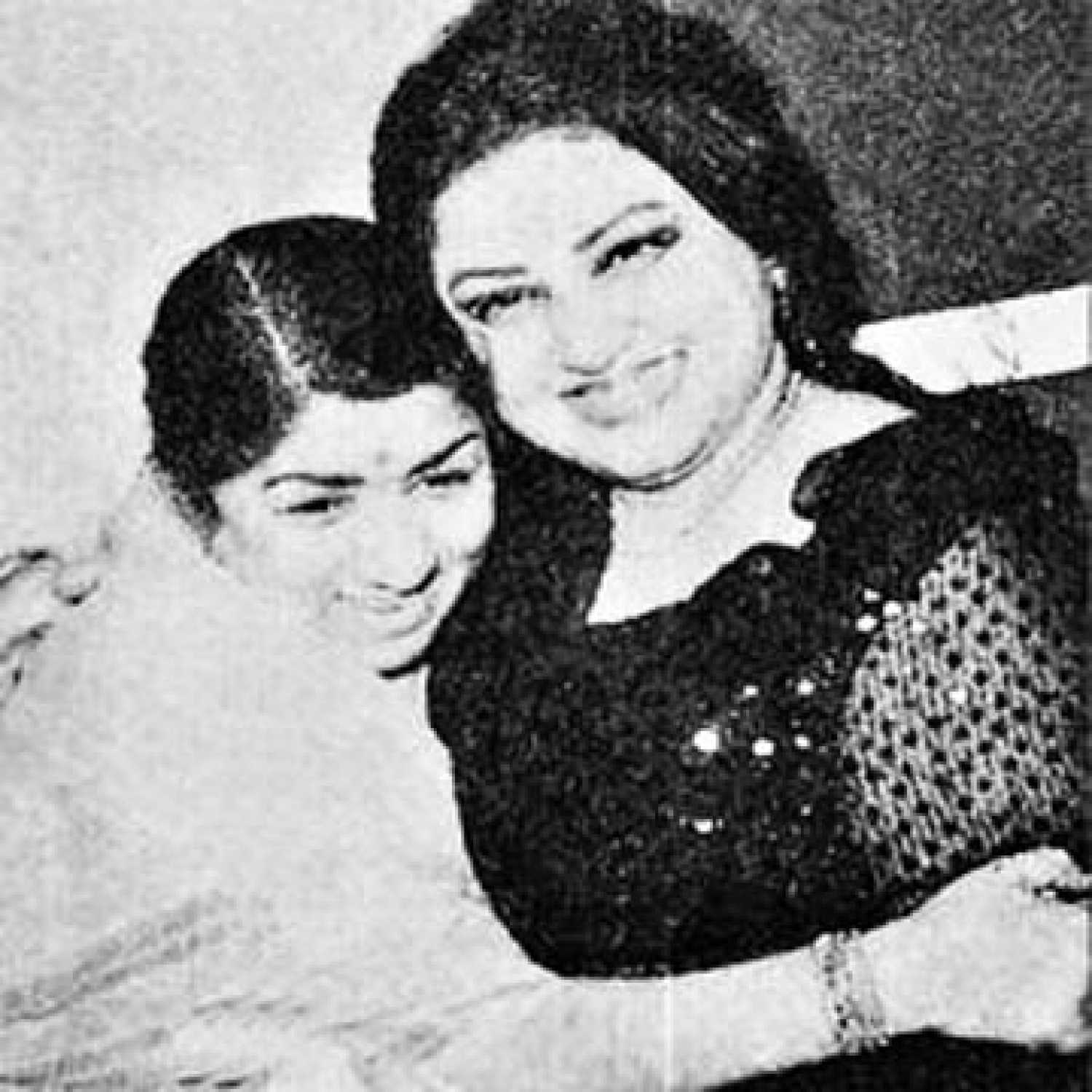
Jehan with singer Lata Mangeshkar

She had an understanding and friendship with many singers of Asia, for example with Alam Lohar and many more. Jehan made great efforts to attend the "Mehfils" (live concerts) of Ustad Salamat Ali Khan, Ustad Fateh Ali Khan, Ustad Nusrat Fateh Ali Khan and Roshan Ara Begum. Lata Mangeshkar commented on Jehan's vocal range, that Jehan could sing as low and as high as she wanted, and that the quality of her voice always remained the same. Singing was, for Jehan, not effortless but an emotionally and physically draining exercise. In the 1990s, Jehan also sang for then débutante actresses Neeli and Reema. For this very reason, Sabiha Khanum affectionately called her Sadabahar (evergreen). Her popularity was further boosted with her patriotic songs during the 1965 war between Pakistan and India.

In 1971 Madam Noor Jehan visited Tokyo for the World Song Festival as a representative from Pakistan.

Jehan visited India in 1982 to celebrate the Golden Jubilee of the Indian talkie movies, where she met Indian Prime Minister Indira Gandhi in New Delhi and was received by Dilip Kumar and Lata Mangeshkar in Bombay. She met all her erstwhile heroes and costars, including Surendra, Pran, Suraiya, composer Naushad and others. The website Women on Record stated: "Noor Jehan injected a degree of passion into her singing unmatched by anyone else. But she left for Pakistan".

In 1991, Vanessa Redgrave invited her to perform at a fundraising event to benefit the children of the Middle East held at Royal Albert Hall London. Lionel Richie, Bob Geldof, Madonna, Boy George, and Duran Duran were some of the performers at the star-studded event which was attended, amongst many others, by thespian John Gielgud, Nobel Prize-winning playwright Harold Pinter, and Oscar-winning actress Dame Peggy Ashcroft. She has also sung "Saiyan Saadey Naal", a song of well-known Pakistani folk singer, songwriter and composer Akram Rahi for the film Dam Mast Kalander/Aalmi Gunday.

== Personal life ==
In 1941, Noor Jehan married Shaukat Hussain Rizvi of Azamgarh, Uttar Pradesh, India. In 1947, Shaukat Rizvi decided to migrate to Pakistan, and Noor Jehan moved too, ending her career in India. She next visited India only in 1982. Her marriage to Rizvi ended in 1953 with a divorce; the couple had three children, including their singer daughter Zil-e-Huma.

Noor Jehan was also in a relationship with cricketer Nazar Mohammad. She married Ejaz Durrani in 1959. The second marriage also produced three children but also ended in divorce in 1971. She also had affair with actor Yousuf Khan.

== Last years and death ==
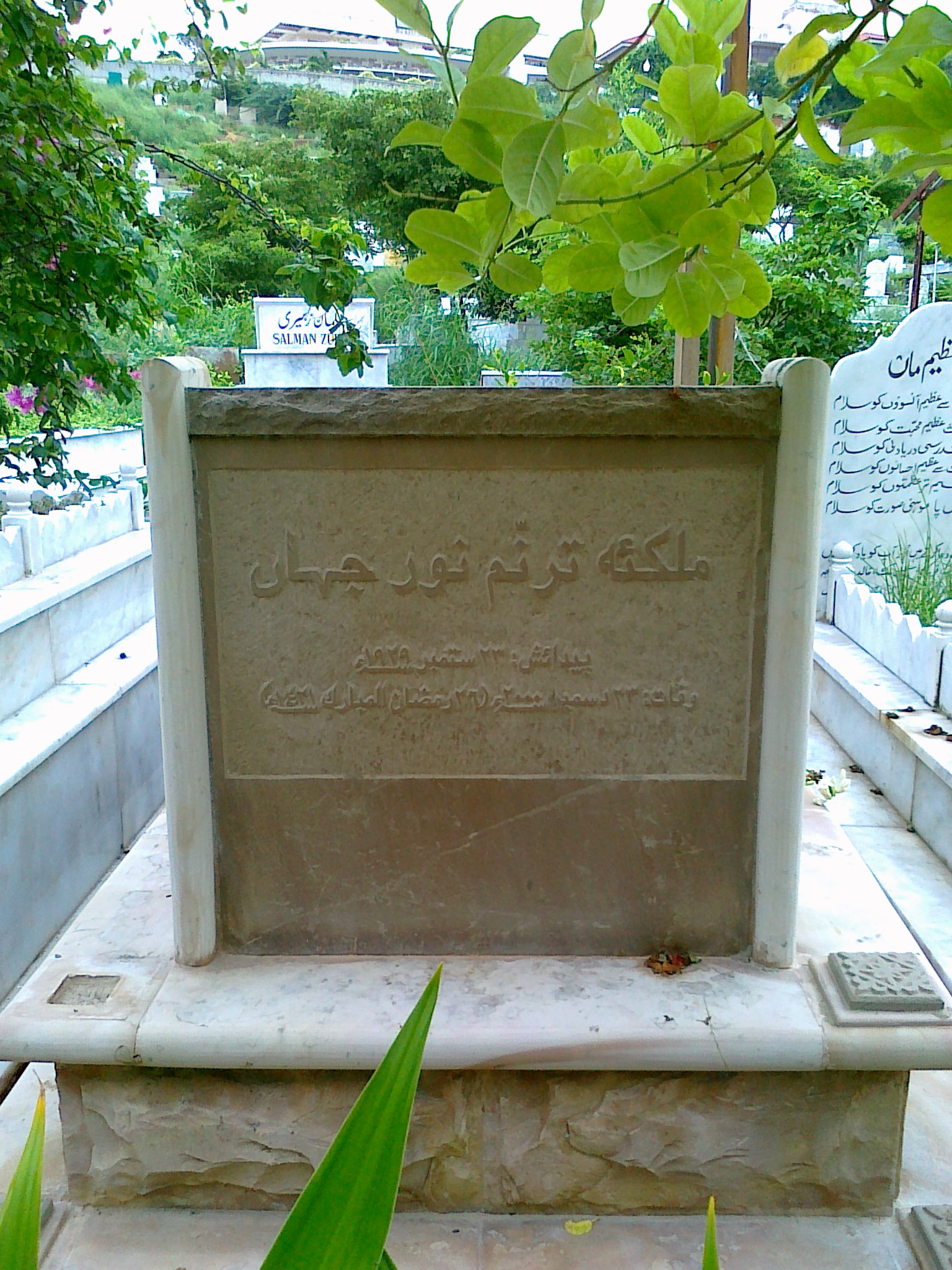
Jehan's gravesite at the Gizri Graveyard near the Saudi Consulate in Karachi

Jehan suffered from chest pains in 1986 on a tour of North America and was diagnosed with angina pectoris, after which she underwent bypass surgery. According to her daughter, Shazia Hassan, she was suffering from chronic kidney disease in her last years and was on dialysis. In 2000, Jehan was hospitalised at Aga Khan University Hospital, Karachi, and suffered a heart attack. On 23 December 2000 (night of 27 Ramadan), Jehan died as a result of heart failure. Her funeral took place at Jamia Masjid Sultan, Karachi and was attended by over 400,000 people. She was buried at the Gizri Graveyard in Karachi. She was given a state funeral by President of Pakistan Pervez Musharraf. He ordered her funeral be taken to Lahore from Karachi, but her daughters insisted on burying her in Karachi on the night she died. In the wake of her death, a famous Indian writer and poet, Javed Akhtar, in an interview in Mumbai, said that "In the worst conditions of our relations with Pakistan in 53 years, in a very hostile atmosphere, our cultural heritage has been a common bridge. Noor Jehan was one such durable bridge. My fear is that her death may have shaken it."

== Awards and honours ==
Noor Jehan received more than 15 Nigar Awards for Best Female Playback Singer, eight for Best Urdu Singer Female and the rest for Punjabi Playback. She has also received the Millennium Singer Award in Pakistan.

- In 1945, for the film Zeenat, she was awarded a gold medal by Z.A. Bukhari.
- Noor Jehan was ranked eighth in a list of Most Influential Pakistanis.
- Mohammad Rafi always wished to make duets with her. Asha Bhosle, a Bollywood playback singer, stated in an interview:

Jehan was one of my favourite singers and when I listened to her Ghazals, I realized how unusual compositions were those, so I decided to take them to a larger audience which they deserve.

She added that;

The world will never see a singer like her. Just as people have not seen another Mohammad Rafi and Kishore Kumar there would never be another Noor Jehan.

- British weekly newspaper Eastern Eye ranked Noor Jehan at 16th in a list of 20 Bollywood singers of all time. The entertainment editor of Eastern Eye wrote that:

Jehan was the first female singing star of the Indian cinema and helped to lay the foundation of playback singing as we know it. She inspired a generation of singers including Lata Mangeshkar before single-handedly kick-starting music In Pakistan and inspired subsequent generations there.

- In 1945, she became the first woman in the subcontinent to sing Qawwali in the film Zeenat. American Queen of Pop Madonna commented that, "I can copy every singer but not Noor Jehan".
- In 1957, she received President's Award for her acting and singing in film Intezaar. It was the same film for which Khwaja Khurshid Anwar also received President's Award for Best Music Director.
- In 1965, she received Special Nigar Award for her wartime songs.
- In 1965, she was awarded Pride of Performance by the president of Pakistan for her singing and acting capabilities.
- She became the Second Pakistani Female Vocalist after Roshan Ara Begum to receive the Pride of Performance award.
- In 1965, she received Tamgha-e-Imtiaz from the army for her moral support in the Indo-Pak war.
- In 1972, she received Silver Disc Award for Best Ghazal Singer followed by Farida Khanum and Roshan Ara Begum was the first to receive the award.
- She was the only Pakistani singer to sing with the Egyptian singer Umm Kulthum.
- In 1981, she received Special Nigar Award for her excellence in 30 years of her career in Pakistan.
- In 1987, she received NTM Life Time Achievement Award.
- In 1991, she became the first Pakistani singer to sing at the Royal Albert Hall London.
- In 1996, she received Sitara-e-Imtiaz.
- In 1998, she received PTV Life Time Achievement Award.
- In 1999, she received Millennium Award for her services to Pakistani cinema.
- In January 2000, Pakistan Television PTV gave her the title of Voice of Century.
- In 2002, she received First Lux Life Time Achievement Award.
- In August 2014, she was declared as the Greatest Female Singer Of Pakistan of all times.
- In August 2017, she was ranked at the top of Female Pakistani Singers.
- She also retained the designation Cultural Ambassador of Pakistan.
- On 21 September 2017, Google Doodle commemorated her 91st birthday.

== Filmography ==
=== British-Indian / IndianFilms ===
Year	Film	Role	Notes
1935	Pind Di Kudi		As child artist
1935	Sheela		As child artist
1936	Misr Ka Sitara		As child artist
1937	Heer-Sayyal		As child artist
1939	Imandaar		As child artist
1939	Pyam-e-Haq		As child artist
1939	Gul-e-Bakawali		As child artist
1940	Sajani		
1940	Yamla Jat		
1941	Chaudhry		
1941	Red Signal		
1941	Umeed		
1941	Susral		
1942	Chandani		
1942	Dheeraj		
1942	Faryad		
1942	Khandan	Zeenat	Shot in Lahore. Second highest grossing Indian film of 1942
1943	Naadaan		
1943	Duhai		
1943	Naukar		Fifth highest grossing Indian film of 1943
1944	Lal Haveli	Mukta	
1944	Dost		
1945	Zeenat	Zeenat	Highest grossing Indian film of 1945
1945	Gaon Ki Gori		Second highest grossing Indian film of 1945
1945	Badi Maa	Hema	Third highest grossing Indian film of 1945
1945	Bhai Jaan		
1946	Anmol Ghadi	Lata alias Renuka	Highest grossing Indian film of 1946 (with Surendra (actor))
1946	Dil		
1946	Humjoli		
1946	Sofia		
1946	Maharana Pratap		
1947	Mirza Sahiban	Sahiban	Fourth highest grossing Indian film of 1947
1947	Jugnu	Jugnu	Highest grossing Indian film of 1947 (with Dilip Kumar)
1947	Abida		
1947	Mirabai		

=== Pakistani Films (only as singer-actress) ===
Year	Film	Role	Notes
1951	Chanway	Seema	First film in Pakistan, biggest hit of 1951
1952	Dupatta	Bulbul	Biggest hit of 1952 in Pakistan
1953	Gulnar		
1955	Patey Khan	Maina	
1956	Lakt-e-Jigar		
1956	Intezaar	Nimmi	
1957	Nooran		
1958	Chhoo Mantar	Naaji	
1958	Anarkali	Nadira alias Anarkali	
1959	Neend	Sanwari	
1959	Pardaisan		
1959	Koel		
1961	Ghalib	Chaudhvin	
1963	Baaji	Singer	Guest appearance in the song "Sajjan Lagi Tori Lagan Mun Maa"
1994	Danda Peer		
1996	Dam Mast Kalander/Aalmi Gunday		

== In popular culture ==
- Director Sarmad Khoosat's television series Piya Naam Ka Diya was about a singer, inspired loosely by Jehan's life.
- In Pakistani film, Manto the role of Jehan was played by Saba Qamar.
- In 2022, Pakistani television actress Ayeza Khan paid tribute to Jehan by adapting her look in TV drama Laapata.
- In 2022, a commemorative tribute to Jehan featured within the 'FaceoftheMonth' series by Indian film scholar, Ashish Dwivedi, published in The Edge Magazine.
