= 3 Bahadur (film series) =

- Directed by: Sharmeen Obaid Chinoy (1, 2, 3)
- Written by: Kamran Khan (1, 2, 3)
- Story by: Kamran Khan (1, 2, 3)
- Produced by: Sharmeen Obaid Chinoy (1, 2; 3); Salman Iqbal (1, 2, 3); Jerjees Seja (1, 2, 3)
- Cinematography: Kamran Khan (1)
- Edited by: Husain Qaizar (1)
- Music by: John Angier (1)
- Production companies: Waadi Animations (1, 2, 3); SOC Films (1)
- Distributed by: ARY Films (1, 2, 3)
- Country: Pakistan
- Language: Urdu
- Box office: Rs. 20.92 crore (US$750,000) (1, 2, 3)

3 Bahadur (Urdu: 3 بہادر) (Read as: Teen Bahadur, Urdu: تین بہادر, teen(۳) is the Urdu number for 3) is a Pakistani film series comprising the animated films directed by Sharmeen Obaid-Chinoy. The series started with the film 3 Bahadur in 2015 and is followed by the sequel 3 Bahadur: The Revenge of Baba Balaam (2016).The third and final installment 3 Bahadur: Rise of the Warriors was released in 2018. Distributed by ARY Films, all films gather the story of three friends and their adventurous journey to save their community from evil.

== Films ==
=== 3 Bahadur (2015) ===
Directed by two times Oscar award winning director Sharmeen Obaid-Chinoy, the plot of the film focuses on three friends and their journey of saving the community from evils like Baba Balaam. The main roles were played by Zuhab Khan, Hanzala Shahid, Muneeba Yaseen, Behroze Sabzwari and Alyy Khan, as Saadi, Kamil, Amna, Dennu and Young Mangu respectively. The film was released on 22 May 2016 in Pakistan as the first full length computer-animated film of Pakistan. It also became highest grossing animated film in Pakistan.

=== 3 Bahadur: The Revenge of Baba Balaam (2016) ===
After getting positive response on 3 Bahadur, director Sharmeen Obaid-Chinoy announced the sequel 3 Bahadur: The Revenge of Baba Balaam. She said "3 Bahadur was a very special project for me because it inculcated a sense of pride and ownership in Pakistani children. Now, with #3Bahadur Part 2, I want to make sure that Saadi, Kamil and Amna inspire bravery and fearlessness in every child across the country." The film will be released in December 2016 and it will be the debut of Fahad Mustafa, Ahmed Ali Butt, Ali Gul Pir and Sarwat Gilani as a voice over artist.

=== 3 Bahadur: Rise of The Warriors (2018) ===
The third film, 3 Bahadur: Rise of the Warriors released in 14 December 2018, which has the voice by Mehwish Hayat, Fahad Mustafa, Sarwat Gillani, Nimra Bucha, and Behroze Sabzwari.

== Cast and characters ==
Character	Film		
Character	3 Bahadur (2015)	3 Bahadur: The Revenge of Baba Balaam (2016)	3 Bahadur: Rise of the Warriors (2018)
Saadi	Zuhab Khan	Zuhab Khan	Zuhab Khan
Kamil	Hanzala Shahid	Hanzala Shahid	Bashar Amir Shafi
Amna	Muneeba Yaseen	Arisha Razi	Arisha Razi
Baba Balaam	Nadir Siddiqui	Salman Shahid	
Deenu	Behroze Sabzwari	Behroze Sabzwari	Behroze Sabzwari
Tony	Mustafa Changazi	Mustafa Changazi	Mustafa Changazi
Teeli	Wasif Ashraf	Ali Gul Pir	Ali Gul Pir
Saadi's mother	Kolsoom Aftab Ahmed	Sarwat Gilani	Sarwat Gilani
Saadi's father	Farhan Qureshi		
Kamil's father	Abu Rashid Khan		
Pateeli	Bassam Shazali	Bassam Shazali	
Chatpa	Bassam Shazali	Bassam Shazali	
Ghutka	Hammad Siddiq	Hammad Siddiq	
Shikra	Hammad Siddiq	Hammad Siddiq	
Young Mangu	Alyy Khan		
Old Mangu	Khalid Ahmed		
Sannata	Badar Qureshi		
Gabru	Joel Frenzer		
Gola		Ahmed Ali Butt	
Lolly		Ali Gul Pir	
Imran		Fahad Mustafa	
Parrot		Zeba Shehnaz	

== Crew ==
Film	Director	Writer(s)	Producer(s)
3 Bahadur (2015)	Sharmeen Obaid-Chinoy	Kamran Khan	Sharmeen Obaid-Chinoy; Salman Iqbal; Jerjees Seja
3 Bahadur: The Revenge of Baba Balaam (2016)	Sharmeen Obaid-Chinoy		Sharmeen Obaid-Chinoy; Salman Iqbal; Jerjees Seja
3 Bahadur: Rise of the Warriors (2018)	Sharmeen Obaid-Chinoy	Kamran Khan	Sharmeen Obaid-Chinoy; Salman Iqbal; Jerjees Seja

== Box office performance ==
Film	Release date	Budget	Box office
3 Bahadur	22 May 2015 (Pakistan)	Rs. 1.50 crore (US$54,000)	Rs. 6.65 crore (US$240,000)
3 Bahadur: The Revenge of Baba Balaam	15 December 2016 (Pakistan)		Rs. 8.10 crore (US$290,000)
3 Bahadur: Rise of the Warriors	14 December 2018 (Pakistan)		Rs. 6.17 crore (US$220,000)
Total			Rs. 20.92 crore (US$750,000)

== See also ==
- List of Pakistani animated films
- List of highest-grossing Pakistani films
- Sharmeen Obaid-Chinoy filmography
