= List of Pakistani animated films =

This is a list of animated films produced in Pakistan. It includes theatrical films, some important short films and upcoming films.

== Featured films ==
This is a list of notable Pakistani animated featured films with their release year, studio, directors, and languages.

Year	Title	Director(s)	Studio(s)	Language(s)	Distributor	Notes
2015	3 Bahadur	Sharmeen Obaid-Chinoy	Waadi Animations, SOC films	Urdu	ARY Films	First full-featured animated film and installment of 3 Bahadur franchise.
2016	3 Bahadur: The Revenge of Baba Balaam	Sharmeen Obaid-Chinoy	Waadi Animations, SOC films	Urdu	ARY Films	2nd installment in franchise.
2018	3 Bahadur: Rise of the Warriors	Sharmeen Obaid-Chinoy	Waadi Animations, SOC films	Urdu	ARY Films	Third and last installment of franchise.
2018	Allahyar and the Legend of Markhor	Uzair Zaheer Khan	3rd World Studios	Urdu	ARY Films	First movie produced entirely in Unreal Engine.
2018	The Donkey King	Aziz Jindani	Talisman Studios	Urdu	Geo Films	Highest-grossing animated feature film of Pakistan.
2018	Tick Tock	Omar Hassan	S4 Solutions Productions	Urdu	Hum Films	A film starring Ahsan Khan, Alyy Khan and Maria Memon is lead roles.
2023	Allahyar and the 100 Flowers of God	Uzair Zaheer Khan	3rd World Studios	Urdu	Mandviwalla Entertainment	Sequel to the 2018 film Allahyar and the Legend of Markhor.
2024	The Glassworker	Usman Riaz	Mano Animation Studios	Urdu, English	Geo Films	First anime-influenced 2D animated film.

== Short films ==
This is a list of notable Pakistani animated short films with their release year, studio, directors, and languages.

Year	Title	Director(s)	Studio(s)	Language(s)	Notes
2020	Sitara: Let Girls Dream	Sharmeen Obaid-Chinoy	Netflix, SOC films	Urdu	Netflix film that focuses social issue of child marriage.
2020	Shehr e Tabassum	Arafat Mazhar	Puffball Studios	Urdu, English	Sci-fi film on Pakistan in 2071.
2020	Swipe	Arafat Mazhar	Puffball Studios	Urdu	A film on the addiction of an app called iFatwa.

== Upcoming films ==
This is a list of Pakistani animated upcoming films.

Year	Title	Director(s)	Studio	Language(s)	Notes
2025	My Daddy My Superhero	Aziz Jindani	Talisman Animation Studios	Urdu	3D-feature superhero-family film.
2025	Under the Blaze	Awais Shaukat	Awartsy	Urdu	First film that focuses on child labour in Pakistan's brick kilns.
TBA	The Chronicles of Umro Ayyar	Arsalan Ali	Ingenuity Productions	Urdu	An adventurous tale of Umro Ayyar.
