= 3 Bahadur: The Revenge of Baba Balaam =

- Theatrical release poster
- Urdu: ٣ بہادر: بابا بالام کا انتقام
- Directed by: Sharmeen Obaid-Chinoy
- Produced by: Sharmeen Obaid-Chinoy; Salman Iqbal; Jerjees Seja
- Starring: Zuhab Khan; Hanzala Shahid; Arisha Razi
- Production company: Waadi Animations
- Distributed by: ARY Films
- Release date: 15 December 2016 (Pakistan)
- Running time: 107 min
- Country: Pakistan
- Language: Urdu
- Box office: Rs. 8.10 crore (US$290,000)

3 Bahadur: The Revenge of Baba Balaam is a Pakistani 3D animated family film directed by Sharmeen Obaid-Chinoy. It is the second installment in the 3 Bahadur franchise.

== Cast ==
- Zuhab Khan as Saadi
- Fahim Khan as Baba Balaam
- Shahzaib Khan as Kamil
- Arisha Razi as Amna
- Behroze Sabzwari as Deenu
- Ahmed Ali Butt as Gola
- Ali Gul Pir as Teeli/Lolly
- Fahad Mustafa as Imran
- Mustafa Changazi as Tony
- Sarwat Gilani as Saadi's mother
- Zeba Shehnaz as Parrot
- Bassam Shazli as Pateeli/Chatpa
- Hammad Siddiq as Ghutka/ Shikra
- Joel Frenzer as Gabru

== Production ==
=== Marketing ===
The sequel of 3 Bahadur was announced in a press release in November 2015. The details revealed that Fahad Mustafa, Ahmed Ali Butt, Salman Shahid and Sarwat Gilani will also lend their voices in the sequel titled 3 Bahadur: The Revenge of Baba Balaam. In March 2016, ARY Films unveiled the first-look poster through a tweet.

== Release ==
The teaser for the film was released on YouTube on 3 August 2016. The official trailer for the film was released online on 27 October 2016. The film was released on 15 December 2016.

== Reception ==
=== Box office ===
The movie opened better on Thursday with day one collecting Rs. 2.17 crore (US$78,000) in its opening week. Film grew 25% relative to previous week collecting Rs. 2.72 crore (US$97,000) taking two weeks total to Rs. 4.89 crore (US$170,000).

== Sequel ==
The third film, 3 Bahadur: Rise of the Warriors was released in December 2018, which has the voice by Mehwish Hayat, Fahad Mustafa, Sarwat Gillani, Nimra Bucha and Behroze Sabzwari.

== See also ==
- List of Pakistani films of 2016
- List of Pakistani animated films
