= Sitara =

Sitara or Sithara may refer to:

== People ==
- Sithara (actress) (born 1973), Indian actress
- Sithara (singer) (born 1986), Indian singer
- Sitara Devi (1920–2014), Indian dancer
- Sitara (actress), Pakistani film actress
- Sitara Hewitt, a British-Pakistani-American actress
- Mohan Sithara (born 1959), Malayalam film music composer

== Film and television ==
- Sitara (1980 film), a 1980 Hindi-language Indian feature film
- Sitaara, a 1984 Telugu-language Indian feature film
- Sitara (2019 film), an Indian Bengali-language film
- Sitara: Let Girls Dream, a 2020 Pakistani animated short film

== Other uses ==
- Sitara (textile), an ornamental curtain used in the sacred sites of Islam
- Sitara ARM Processor, a family of processors available from Texas Instruments
- HAL HJT-36 Sitara, an Indian subsonic intermediate jet trainer aircraft
- Sitara (magazine), an Indian film news magazine

== See also ==
- Sithara (disambiguation)
- Satara (disambiguation)
