= Ek Thi Marium =

2016 Pakistani television film

- Television release poster
- Urdu: اک تھی مریم
- Genre: Biography; Drama
- Based on: Marium Mukhtiar
- Screenplay by: Umera Ahmad
- Directed by: Sarmad Khoosat
- Starring: Sanam Baloch; Behroze Sabzwari; Hina Khawaja Bayat
- Music by: Shani Arshad
- Opening theme: "Pankh Laga Ke" by Zeb Bangash
- Ending theme: "Aye Rah-e-Haq Kay Shaheedo" by Coke Studio 9 artists
- Country of origin: Pakistan
- Original language: Urdu

Production
- Producer: Nina Kashif
- Cinematography: Qasim Ali
- Editors: Faizan Imtiaz; Ahsan Durrani
- Running time: 80 minutes
- Production company: Paragon Productions

Original release
- Network: Urdu 1
- Release: 6 September 2016

Ek Thi Marium (Urdu: ایک تھی مریم transl. Once there was a Marium) is a 2016 Pakistani biographical television film based on the life of Pakistani female fighter pilot Marium Mukhtiar. Produced by Nina Kashif, it is directed by Sarmad Sultan Khoosat and written by Umera Ahmad. It features Sanam Baloch in the title role of Marium Mukhtiar, while Hina Khawaja Bayat and Behroze Sabzwari the played roles of Marium's parents. It was premiered on Defence Day 2016 on Urdu 1. Upon release, the film as well as Baloch's performance received critical acclaim. On 21 October 2016, the film was released in Cinepax nationwide.

== Plot ==
Colonel Mukhtiar Ahmed Sheikh lives in Malir Cantonment, Karachi, together with his wife Rehana Mukhtiar and children Marium Mukhtiar, Marvi Mukhtiar, and Shahrukh Mukhtiar . With an excellent academic career and aim of joining the Pakistan Air Force as a fighter pilot from childhood, Marium enters into the engineering field against her will to fulfill her parents' dream. She continuously found means to equip herself with planes and after spending a year at university she asked her parents' permission to join the Pakistan Air Force. Reluctant of her decision, Marium's father tries to make her understand that a cadet's life is tough, especially for girls, but after seeing her determination, he agrees. Marium begins to prepare herself for the PAF written test and becomes successful both in the test and interview but awaits a final call. Upon returning from university she finds out that the results have been announced, when she encounters her neighbor, who informed her that his son has been selected. She runs to find out her results, and when she could not find her admission letter she becomes disappointed, only to be surprised by her family that she has been selected, and the whole family celebrates.

Marium arrives at PAF Risalpur Academy for training and befriends her roommate, Mahrukh. She, along with other new cadets, is often pranked by seniors as per usual PAF traditions. However, she managed herself through tough physical training and the five o'clock life of cadets. During training she often decides to quit but is encouraged by her mother, who tells her that she is now a "daughter of soil". During her first visit home at her sister's marriage she finds out that her senior's plane has crashed during an operation and prepares herself for any future hazard. After hectic training, tests and flying missions she passed with distinction and becomes a flying officer. She then successfully passed her first solo flight mission, and as per PAF tradition is welcomed by co-cadets throwing buckets of water on her. While on vacation at home, Rehana informed Marium that her senior, Flight Engineer Qaiser has sent a proposal for her. She asks Marium to consider this proposal. Reluctant at first, she agrees to meet Qaiser and ends up getting engaged. After returning to their bases, Marium at PAF Base M.M. Alam in Mianwali, while Qaiser at PAF Faisal Base in Karachi, both frequently talk and plan for their future.

Back at the base, on her first routine operational training mission, Marium boards an FT-7PG aircraft along with Squadron Leader Saqib Abbasi but during flight their plane suffers a mechanical failure. Unable to overcome the situation, both pilots eject a moment before their plane hits the ground near Kundian in Mianwali District. Abbasi suffers minor injuries while Mukhtiar succumbs to her injuries in a military hospital. At the age of 23, Marium becomes the first female fighter pilot to die in the line of duty. Marium's mother receives her casualty notification from five officers along with her cap and Pakistan's flag. Marium receives a guard of honour and a 19-gun salute and was later awarded the Tamgha-e-Basalat by the Government of Pakistan, received by her parents.

== Cast ==
The following are the only billed cast.

- Sanam Baloch as Marium Mukhtiar, first Pakistani female fighter pilot to die in the line of duty
- Hina Khawaja Bayat as Rehana Mukhtiar, Marium's mother
- Behroze Sabzwari as Colonel Mukhtiar Ahmed Sheikh, Marium's father and retired officer
- Shermeen Ali as Marvi Mukhtiar, doctor and Marium's older sister
- Hadi bin Arshad as Shahrukh Mukhtiar, Marium's younger brother
- Agha Mustafa Hassan as Flight Engineer Qaiser, Marium's fiancé
- Sajida Syed as Marium's grandmother
- Alizey Mehak as Mahrukh, Marium's roommate and friend

== Production ==
=== Development ===
Initially Mehreen Jabbar was associated with Urdu1 for the telefilm on the first female fighter Pilot of Pakistan, Marium Mukhtar, who died on 24 November 2015, in the line of duty when her FT-7PG aircraft crashed near Kundian in Mianwali District in the northwest of Punjab, and was assigned to direct the film but due to her commitments to her film Dobara Phir Se she left the project, but assisted throughout the telefilm. Director Sarmad Sultan Khoosat came on board, while Umera Ahmad wrote the screenplay for the telefilm and was produced by Nina Kashif and Urdu1 Pictures. The film was then decided to be released on Pakistan's Defence Day on Urdu1 under the banner of Paragon Productions.

=== Casting ===
In June 2016, Sanam Baloch was cast to portray Mukhtar, she said "When I came to know it’s about Marium Mukhtar and I had to portray her, I decided I have to do it no matter what, although I was in talks with someone else as well for July". She was approached by channel Urdu1 and she said, "Urdu1 along with Mehreen Jabbar directly approached me for the tele-film. Also when I came to know Umera has written it, I couldn't refuse it. It is the role of Marium Mukhtar, a national hero. This project is particularly for myself, my satisfaction as an actor - although it is extremely challenging to live her life and go through the entire process of training but I have to live [the] life of someone incredible."

In order to draw more reality to the character Baloch had to attend pilot training to learn key points, she said "before the shoot, I had spent first two days with the cadets so I can adapt to their environment and body language at the Air Force Academy. I have a couple of Air force people and trainers at the shoot (set), who are helping me out with it. I am trying my best to replicate the way they move about" It was Baloch's first appearance on television after three years. She was last seen on Ahmed's TV series Kankar (2013).

To prepare for her role as a fighter pilot, she dwelt among cadets during shootings and went through hectic physical training. In an interview she explained, "I still haven’t been able to decipher my method to acting. It just happens there and then. Maybe I want to be in the moment while it is being done. So for this character, my approach was the same, that is to get into her head." She further said, "I've never played a real life character before, so I had to be extra careful of everything. For example, I noticed she wore a specific wristwatch. I knew people wouldn’t notice such a detail but I made sure I wear such a watch too. It had to be less of myself and more of her and it was challenging. I loved doing all the physical training. I loved sports when I was young and that made things easier for me. And you know what the instructors were impressed and they even asked me to join Air Force."

=== Filming ===
Principal photography began in late July 2016. The film was shot in Risalpur and in Karachi. Before the shoot, Sanam went through training at the Pakistan Air Force Academy. Assistant director Syed Nabeel Ali Jafri said, "We did the principal photography in late July and most of the film was shot outdoors so it was extremely difficult. The temperatures were around 45 to 50 degrees every day and we used to shoot all day long." Baloch spent two days with the cadets at the academy to adapt to their environment and body language. Baloch spent most of her time at Risalpur Academy during shooting and trained with cadets for the film. She attended physical training, including running, jumping, and carrying heavy arms. She also learned to fly a trainer plane, Mashaaq.

== Soundtrack ==
On 31 August 2016, the soundtrack of Ek Thi Marium, "Pankh Laga Ke", was released online on the channel's website. The soundtrack along with the background music for the telefilm was composed by Shani Arshad and was performed by Zeb Bangash, with all the lyrics penned by Sabir Zafar. In the closing credits of the film, the "Aye Rah-e-Haq Kay Shaheedo" song was used from the 9th season of Coke Studio performed by its featured artists. Originally performed by Naseem Begum, it was recomposed as a tribute to Pakistani soldiers on eves of the 69th Independence of Pakistan and Defence Day.

=== Track listing ===
No.	Title	Lyrics	Singer(s)	Length
1.	"Pankh Laga Ke"	Sabir Zafar	Zeb Bangash	3:30
2.	"Aye Rah-e-Haq Kay Shaheedo"	Musheer Kazmi	Coke Studio 9 artists	5:18

== Reception ==
=== Critical reception ===
The film received an overwhelmingly positive response from critics, particularly for Baloch's performance.

=== Ratings ===
Ek Thi Marium was watched by 1.5 million viewers, which earned 3.04 TRP, placing the channel at number one, leaving Hum TV and ARY Digital at second and third place respectively.

== See also ==
- Aik Hai Nigar
- ISPR Media Productions
