= 3 Bahadur: Rise of the Warriors =

- Film poster
- Directed by: Sharmeen Obaid-Chinoy
- Written by: Kamran Khan
- Starring: Mehwish Hayat; Fahad Mustafa; Sarwat Gillani; Nimra Bucha; Behroze Sabzwari
- Production company: Waadi Animations
- Distributed by: ARY Films
- Release date: 14 December 2018 (PK)
- Running time: 94 minutes
- Country: Pakistan
- Language: Urdu
- Box office: Rs. 61.7 million (US$220,000)

3 Bahadur: Rise of the Warriors (Urdu: 3 بہادر: جنگجوؤں کا عروج) is a Pakistani animated action film directed by Sharmeen Obaid-Chinoy and written by Kamran Khan. It is the third and the final installment in the 3 Bahadur trilogy animated film series and the sequel to 3 Bahadur: The Revenge of Baba Balaam (2016). The film stars the voices by Mehwish Hayat, Fahad Mustafa, Sarwat Gillani, Nimra Bucha and Behroze Sabzwari. It released nationwide on 14 December 2018 by ARY Films.

== Cast ==
- Zuhab Khan as Saadi
- Arisha Razi as Amna
- Bashar Amir Shafi as Kamil
- Mehwish Hayat as Erma
- Fahad Mustafa as Imran; Amna's father
- Sarwat Gillani as Kulsoom; Saadi's mother
- Nimra Bucha as Babushka
- Behroze Sabzwari as Deenu
- Khalid Malik as Kamil's father
- Faheem Khan as Gunchu
- Mustafa Changezi as Tony
- Sarwan Ali Palijo as Kamil bhai

== Production ==
In September 2018, ARY Films announced the production on the third animated film installment in the 3 Bahadur film series was completed, with the voices by Mehwish Hayat, Fahad Mustafa, Sarwat Gillani, Nimra Bucha, and Behroze Sabzwari, with the production done at Waadi Animations. Director Sharmeen Obaid Chinoy said in an interview to The News that the film "has some very strong female characters", featuring "a number of very strong women" from the industry, who "will change the way we see the power of women". She added that "the action sequences are stronger", and "special VFX (with effects)" have been introduced.

Writer Kamran Khan told Dawn that "The characters have grown just like their audience and the plot this time is more complex" with "twists and turns" to keep them "involved in the story". He added that they had decided if the second film does well, the franchise will be a trilogy, "if the need to revive 3 Bahadur arises in the future, who knows we might find a way". The director told that they had "special screenings" to ensure "that kids from all over Pakistan" familiarise with 3 Bahadur.

At the trailer launch, Dettol was announced as the title sponsor for the film, with Dettol Warriors also featuring in it. A golden ticket campaign was started by Dettol for the target audience of children.

== Soundtrack ==
- Title Song
  Singers: Asrar and Hadiqa Kiyani
  Music by: Baqir Abbas and Hassan Badshah

== Release ==
3 Bahadur: Rise of the Warriors released on 14 December 2018 by ARY Films.

== See also ==
- List of Pakistani animated films
- List of Pakistani films of 2018
- Nickelodeon (Pakistan)
