= Marium Mukhtiar =

Pakistani fighter pilot (1992–2015)

Flying Officer Marium Mukhtiar
- Born: May 18, 1992
- Died: November 24, 2015 (aged 23); Kundian, Mianwali District, Punjab, Pakistan
- Burial place: Malir Cantonment Graveyard
- Military career
- Allegiance: Pakistan
- Branch: Pakistan Air Force
- Rank: Flying Officer
- Known for: Pakistan's first female fighter pilot to die in the line of duty
- Awards: Tamgha-e-Basalat

Marium Mukhtiar (May 19, 1992 – November 24, 2015) was a Pakistani fighter pilot. She died flying a Pakistan Air Force (PAF) FT-7PG aircraft that crashed near Kundian in Mianwali District, northwestern Punjab, Pakistan on November 24, 2015. She was the first female Pakistani fighter pilot to die in the line of duty.

== Early life and career ==
Marium Mukhtiar was born into a Sindhi Shaikh family to Colonel Ahmed Mukhtiar who settled in Karachi, as his home town. She attended the Mehran Model School and College in Pano Akil and completed her intermediate from Army Public School and College (APSACS) in Malir Cantonment, Karachi. She played football for Balochistan United in the National Women Football Championship. She studied civil engineering at NED University before qualifying as a fighter pilot in the Pakistan Air Force (PAF) in 2014, along with six other women. She was also involved in charity work, supporting a school for children who were unable to afford an education.

== Death ==
On 24 November 2015, Mukhtiar and her instructor pilot Squadron Leader Saqib Abbasi were on a routine training mission when their FT-7PG crashed near Kundian, Mianwali, Punjab. Both pilots ejected from the cockpit; Abbasi suffered minor injuries, but Mukhtiar died of her injuries in a military hospital. According to a PAF spokesperson, Mukhtiar and Abbasi had ejected at too low an altitude. Abbasi survived possibly because he had managed to eject a few seconds earlier.

Mukhtiar's death was declared a martyrdom (or shahadat) by the PAF, which said both pilots "handled the serious emergency with professionalism and courage and tried to save the ill-fated aircraft until the very last minutes.Flying Officer Mukhtiar could have saved her life had she ejected before taking PAF FT-7PG out of populous areas but both pilots decided to take the risk to keep flying the falling jet."

She is buried in Malir Cantonment Graveyard.

== Awards ==
In December 2015, Pakistan's Senate Standing Committee on Defence (SSCD) recommended Mukhtiar for a state award. She was awarded the Tamgha-e-Basalat by the Government of Pakistan in early 2016.

== Popular culture ==
- Ek Thi Marium – a 2016 Pakistani biographical telefilm aired by Urdu 1, directed by Sarmad Sultan Khoosat, written by Umera Ahmad, and starring Sanam Baloch as Mukhtiar.
