= Allahyar and the 100 Flowers of God =

Pakistani animated science fiction adventure film

- Directed by: Uzair Zaheer Khan
- Written by: Uzair Zaheer Khan
- Produced by: Uzair Zaheer Khan
- Starring: Anum Zaidi; Ali Zafar; Iqra Aziz; Humayun Saeed; Bushra Ansari; Azfar Jafri; Meera; Zayn Marie Khan
- Cinematography: Sohail Akhtar
- Production company: 3rd World Studios
- Distributed by: Mandviwalla Entertainment
- Release date: 28 June 2023
- Running time: 90 minutes
- Country: Pakistan
- Language: Urdu

Allahyar and the 100 Flowers of God (Urdu: اللہ یار اور خدا کے 100 پھول) is a 2023 Pakistani animated science fiction adventure film directed and written by Uzair Zaheer Khan. It is a sequel to 2018 film Allahyar and the Legend of Markhor produced by 3rd World Studios. The film stars the voices by Ali Zafar, Iqra Aziz, Humayun Saeed, Meera, and Bushra Ansari. It was released in Pakistan on 28 June 2023 by Mandviwalla Entertainment. The film is the "first stereoscopic 3D animated feature produced in Pakistan."

== Cast ==
- Ali Zafar as Minister
- Iqra Aziz as Aira
- Humayun Saeed as Sage
- Bushra Ansari as Lizzy Appa
- Azfar Jafri as Hero
- Anum Zaidi as Allahyar
- Meera as Bush Princess
- Zayn Marie Khan

== Production ==
In January 2020, 3rd World Studios announced on YouTube about the production of the second installment of its animated film Allahyar and the Legend of Markhor. The film was directed by Uzair Zaheer Khan, a Pakistani film director and screenwriter who also directed the 2018 film Allahyar and the Legend of Markhor.

The first teaser of the film was released on 23 March 2021 with distribution by Mandviwalla Entertainment.

== Release ==
The trailer for the film was released on 26 May 2023 on YouTube. The film was initially scheduled to release in theatres on 2 June 2023. It was released on 28 June 2023 in Pakistan and distributed by Mandviwalla Entertainment.

== Reception ==
Mohammad Kamran Jawaid, in his review for Dawn/Images, stated, "For the laymen who don't want to get into the technical nitty gritties and just want to know whether the sequel to Allahyar is worth the price of admission — well, I've got good news for you, it's right up there with the best of them." while a review in Dawn wrote, "If wildlife preservation was the idea behind the first film of Allahyar, then the alarming global crisis and shortage of trees are behind the sequel. Allahyar truly rises to the occasion as Muhafiz and saves again with his heroics."

Reporting a special screening, The Nation found "the film lives up to its promise of quality acting along with action, drama and comedy, and what's more, social messages that were greatly appreciated by the audience."

== Soundtrack ==
The OST of the film "Tooti Si Dunya" by Ali Zafar was released on 18 August 2023.

Film OST
No.	Title	Lyrics	Music	Singer(s)	Length
1.	"Meray Malik"	Atif 'Rehan' Siddique	Ahmed Ali	Sanam Marvi
2.	"Tooti Si Dunya"	Ali Zafar	Ali Zafar, Hassan Badshah	Ali Zafar
3.	"Des Kamaal"	Grehan	Grehan	Imran Saeed

== See also ==
- List of Pakistani animated films
- List of Pakistani films of 2023
