= Lali (film) =

Pakistani film

- Directed by: Sarmad Khoosat
- Screenplay by: Sarmad Khoosat; Sundas Hashmi
- Produced by: Sarmad Khoosat; Kanwal Khoosat
- Cinematography: Khizer Idrees
- Edited by: Saim Sadiq
- Music by: Abdullah Siddiqui
- Production companies: Khoosat Films; Enso Films
- Release date: 20 February 2026 (Berlinale)
- Running time: 116 minutes
- Country: Pakistan
- Language: Punjabi

Lali (Urdu: لالی; lit: Red) is a 2026 Pakistani Punjabi-language dark comedy fantasy drama film directed by Sarmad Khoosat. It premiered on 20 February 2026 at the 76th Berlin International Film Festival, and became the first all-Pakistani production to premiere at the Berlinale. In Lali, a couple caught between love and destiny navigates desires, superstitions, and fears as the living and the dead coexist in a restless world filled with dark humor. The film stars Mamya Shajaffar, Channan Hanif, Rasti Farooq, Farazeh Syed and Mehar Bano in lead roles. Lali screened at over 15 international film festivals in 2026, spanning four continents including the BFI London and VIFF.

== Plot ==
Set in the shantytowns of Sahiwal, the story follows Zeba (Mamya Shajaffar) and Sajawal (Channan Hanif), a couple bound by an inherited union. Sajawal is an introverted metal fabricator who is self-conscious about a prominent facial birthmark, while Zeba is widely feared and rumored to be a "cursed bride" because her three previous suitors died under mysterious and violent circumstances before their weddings. As the two marry, Sajawal's paranoia spirals out of control. The film is a surreal, uninhibited "fever dream" that explores desire, grief, and folklore, seamlessly blending dark humor with a supernatural lens where the living share space with the dead and ghosts.

== Cast ==
- Mamya Shajaffar as Zeba
- Channan Hanif as Sajawal
- Rasti Farooq as Bholi
- Farazeh Syed as Sohni Ammi
- Mehar Bano as Noor Jahan

== Production ==
The film was directed by Sarmad Khoosat who co-wrote the screenplay as well. It was edited by Saim Sadiq and the cinematography was done by Khizer Idrees. The project was developed under the working title Shikra, named after Shiv Kumar Batalvi's famous poem "Maye ni Maye, Main Ik Shikra Yaar Banaya" before Khoosat shifted to Lali because it worked as a subtle Easter egg within the narrative. The script was inspired by his aunt's semi-published short story collection Kaala Kambal, which he bought the rights to as the first acquisition of Khoosat Films. Khoosat explained the significance of red not only as a colour of celebration, but also as one of warning, anger, and blood. Describing it as a hue that refuses to be ignored, he also discussed the Shakespearean chorus of four singing men, the deliberate use of live singing over playback, and the strong mother characters that recur across his films, such as Sohni Ammi and Zeba, whom he described as "alter-egos I wish for many women in my life."

== Release ==
=== International Screening ===
Lali made cinematic history with its world premiere on February 20, 2026, at the 76th Berlin International Film Festival. Screening in the festival's prestigious Panorama section, it marked a monumental milestone as the first fully Pakistani feature film production to premiere at the Berlinale. Following this historic debut, the film embarked on an extensive global circuit throughout the spring and summer of 2026. It screened at the Istanbul Film Festival through April 19 before celebrating its US Premiere from April 23 to 26 at the Indian Film Festival of Los Angeles (IFFLA), where it clinched a notable Honourable Mention. Simultaneously, the feature crossed over to South America to screen at BAFICI in Buenos Aires through late April.

Lali continued its international run into the summer as an Official Selection at the Austin Asian American Film Festival from June 24 to 28, before traveling to Vietnam for the 4th Da Nang Asian Film Festival (DANAFF) from June 28 to July 4, cementing its status as a resonant global success. In September 2026, the film was announced as an Official Selection at the DC South Asian Film Festival, screening from September 11 to 13, where Khoosat won the Best Director award. It continued with a slot at the ScreenShot Asia Film Festival from September 16 to 23, and made its Premiere as the Friday Night Feature at the Mosquers Film Festival on September 18. Lali was selected as the Centerpiece Film at the 17th Chicago South Asian Film Festival, where it screened on September 19 at AMC River East 21, marking its Chicago premiere. The film was also selected as the Opening Night Feature at the International South Asian Film Festival (iSAFF) in Surrey, British Columbia, where it had its Canadian premiere on September 24, and as the Opening Night film at the Mosaic International South Asian Film Festival (MISAFF) in Mississauga, Ontario on September 30, followed by its UK Premiere at the 2026 BFI London Film Festival under Laugh Thematic strand in October 2026. Lali also screened at the 2026 Vancouver International Film Festival in the Panorama programme. Lali screened at the 3rd San Francisco International South Asian Film Festival on October 10 at the Roxie Theater. The film had its Seattle screening on October 15 at the Tasveer Film Festival, preceded by a red carpet and followed by a Q&A with the cast and crew. It continued its UK festival run with an official screening at the Bath Film Festival on October 25, 2026.

Lali competed in the international competition at the 9th Yakutsk International Film Festival, held from 4 to 9 November 2026, representing Pakistan alongside films from across Asia and the world.

== Reception ==
=== Critical reception ===
International Cinephile Society gave the film 3.5 stars. In a review by the Screen Daily, the film was noted for its bold storytelling, vivid cinematography, and candid depiction of relationships, but criticized for its tonal inconsistencies and unclear plot elements. IONCINEMA critic Oscar Aitchison praised the film's vivid visuals and authentic depiction of Pakistani life but criticized its narrative as confusing and its climax as an exaggerated, caricatured turn that undermined its earlier subtlety. He ultimately rated the film 2.5 out of 5 stars. Asian Movie Pulse praised Lali as a "remarkable tragicomedy" that is "brilliantly shot" with inventive visuals, though it noted the film's tonal shifts across five distinct segments undermine its unity. The review concluded that despite some narrative weaknesses, the film is a must-see discovery in Pakistani cinema.

In a preview of the Indian Film Festival of Los Angeles for Scroll.in, Lali was described as a "strange, seductive tale of repression, possession and paranoia" that is "initially darkly funny and then dark." The reviewer praised Khoosat's handling of the film's sudden narrative swerves, the "gorgeous colour-coded, suitably jarring camerawork" by cinematographer Khizer Idrees, Abdullah Siddiqui's haunting score, and the "excellent performances" that reflect the script's "normalised bizarreness." The review noted that Khoosat's grasp "slips only in the melodramatic climax," but overall positioned Lali alongside Joyland as "another bold swing at unseen aspects of Pakistani culture."

In a review by award winning Indian film critic Meenakshi Shedde, Lali is described as a "visually stunning" and genre-defying film that "careens cheerfully at high speed between genres," blending comedy, horror, and musical elements to deliver a "unique and courageous" vision of marriage's dark underbelly. Shedde praised the film for its explosive desire and its unflinching portrayal of abuse, set against spectacular Punjabi landscapes, with "stunning" cinematography by Khizer Idrees. She concludes that the film is a significant breakthrough for Pakistani cinema, offering a scathing critique of patriarchal traditions while being unlike any film seen from Pakistan or even India. In a review for The Curb, Lali was described as an "unsettling and thought-provoking film that refuses easy catharsis," praised for its meticulous use of red symbolism, Abdullah Siddiqui's foreboding score, Saim Sadiq's assured editing, and Mamya Shajaffar's layered performance particularly her haunting rendition of Shiv Kumar Batalvi's poem "Raat chanani main turaan." The reviewer noted the film's clever misdirection, shifting from a fable-like domestic comedy in its first hour into a grotesque nightmare and a scathing social critique of how South Asian women are expected to absorb male damage in abusive marriages. However, the review criticised the unnecessary chapter structure and the underdeveloped character of Bholi, calling the latter an "avoidable misstep."

In a review for Movies We Texted About, Lali was described as "never not interesting" and a film that offers "something old and something very new," praised for its unusual depiction of power struggles within a relationship and the fascinating work of its leads, Channan Hanif as a man ruled by his facial difference and Mamya Shajaffar as a woman fighting to stay positive amid grief. The reviewer highlighted Farazeh Syed's scene-stealing debut as Sohni Ammi, calling her "impossible to dislike," and noted that the film's frank assessment of male-female dynamics was surprising given it was co-written by a brother-sister duo. However, the review criticised the film for biting off more than it could chew, an overdone tree metaphor, and a finale that "feels forced," turning a mature relationship into something "stereotypical and boring."

In a review for Eye For Film, Edin Custo praised Lali for flipping the "monster-in-law" trope, suggesting the real villain is the man-child raised by the mother, not the mother herself . The review highlights Farazeh Syed's commanding performance as Sohni Ammi, describing her affection for Zeba as "practical, protective, and oddly tender". Custo notes that Sajawal's immaturity and insecurity become the "true contaminant," with his private shame turning into patriarchal control, and praises Mamya Shajaffar's Zeba for never becoming a martyr, instead showing "agency, tact, and steel". The review commends the film's visual commitment to its red palette and its portrayal of Punjabi customs without exoticizing them, and notes that the late twist where Sajawal's insecurity leads him to relocate blame onto an external force results in an "exorcism" that is "simply refusing to play along."

== Accolades ==
Year	Ceremony	Category	Recipient(s)	Result	Ref.
2026	DC South Asian Film Festival	Best Director	Sarmad Khoosat	Won	
2026	International South Asian Film Festival (iSAFF)	Excellence in Feature Filmmaking	Lali	Won	
2026	Mosaic International South Asian Film Festival (MISAFF)	Special Jury Prize	Lali	Won	
2026	Mosaic International South Asian Film Festival (MISAFF)	Best Sound Design	Lali	Won	
2026	Mosaic International South Asian Film Festival (MISAFF)	Best Supporting Actress	Farazeh Syed	Won	
2026	Yakutsk International Film Festival (YIFF)	Best Actress	Mamya Shajaffar	Won	

== See also ==
- List of Pakistani films of 2026
