= 3 Bahadur =

- Theatrical release poster
- Urdu: ٣ بہادر
- Directed by: Sharmeen Obaid-Chinoy
- Written by: Kamran Khan
- Story by: Kamran Khan
- Produced by: Sharmeen Obaid-Chinoy; Salman Iqbal; Jerjees Seja
- Starring: Muneeba Yaseen; Hanzala Shahid; Zuhab Khan
- Cinematography: Kamran Khan
- Edited by: Husain Qaizar
- Music by: John Angier
- Production companies: Waadi Animations; SOC Films; ARY
- Distributed by: ARY Films
- Release dates: 22 May 2015 (Pakistan); 13 November 2015 (Worldwide)
- Running time: 94 minutes
- Country: Pakistan
- Language: Urdu
- Box office: Rs. 66.5 million (US$240,000)

3 Bahadur (lit. 'three brave ones') is a 2015 Pakistani animated adventure film produced and directed by Sharmeen Obaid-Chinoy. It is the first installment in the 3 Bahadur franchise. The film is co-produced by Waadi Animations which is a joint-venture of SOC films and ARY Films. 3 Bahadur is Pakistan's first animated feature-length film. Film's plot focuses on three eleven-year-old friends, Amna, Saadi and Kamil, three extraordinary children who rise from the unlikeliest of places to save their community from the evils that plague it. The film is set in a fictional town called Roshan Basti (Town of light). Equipped with courage and super powers, they battle against the odds and stand up to injustice to restore peace and harmony in their once thriving community and live a very happy life.

3 Bahadur was theatrically released nationwide by ARY Films on 22 May 2015. It became the highest-grossing animated film at the local box office breaking the previous record of Rio 2. The film grossed Rs. 6.65 crore (US$240,000) after 50 days of successful run in cinemas and became 7th highest-grossing film of Pakistan.

== Plot ==
During a festival in the town of Roshan Nagar, a little girl is kidnapped by a thug named Mangu. A man named Ahmed runs after him, knocks the thug over and rescues the girl. Mangu is then chased towards a cave where he meets a demonic creature named Baba Balaam who gives him evil powers and tells him to protect the key of evil. One night, Mangu emerges from the tower clock and orders the people of Roshan Nagar that he is now their king. Ahmed, the man who rescued the girl, informs the people to not listen to his theatrics. Consequently, Mangu uses his powers to strangle Ahmed while raising him up to the tower, killing him. Soon, Mangu's thugs spread fear all over the town, which later became known as Andher Basti.

Three friends, Saadi, Amna and Kamil are curious to find out about the tower and defeat the thugs even though Saadi's mother orders him not to pay attention to it. The three enter the tower and are granted powers by unknown creatures. Amna has been granted super speed, Kamil, super hearing and Saadi is granted intelligence and the ability to comprehend things cleverly. The next night, they enter the tower again and defeat Mangu's thugs while Mangu attacks them. They are then rescued and shielded by the unknown creatures and are brought to an unknown place.

There they get to know that their local security guard, Deenu Chacha is the guardian of the key which preserves all the good powers. The three kids are granted more powers. Kamil has the ability to fly and jump up high, Amna has the power to create shields and Saadi has the power to create black holes. Mangu tells Saadi about his father's death and recalls that Ahmed was Saadi's father who tried to stop him 10 years ago which angers Saadi. They use all their powers to defeat Mangu by throwing himself and the evil key into a powerful black hole that Saadi creates with all his power. As the key is destroyed, Mangu's influence diminishes and the 3 Bahadur succeed in returning peace to their land.

== Cast ==
You may move your hands to better express yourself on stage or in front of the camera, but in a voice booth, you only have your voice as a communication tool to express yourself. Plus, there is the additional pressure of maintaining that character and ensuring there's a level of normalcy.

— Bassam Shazli, who voiced Pateeli & Chapta
- Zuhab Khan as Saadi (known as Lucas in the US)
- Muneeba Yaseen as Amna
- Hanzala Shahid as Kamil
- Behroze Sabzwari as Deenu Chacha
- Alyy Khan as Young Mangu
- Abu Rashid Khan as Kamil's father
- Kulsoom Aftab Ahmed as Saadi's mother
- Farhan Qureshi as Saadi's father
- Mustafa Changazi as Tony
- Badar Qureshi as Sannata
- Nadir Siddiqui as Baba Balaam
- Wasif Arshad as Teeli
- Khalid Ahmed as old Mangu (Jude Law as Mangu in US)
- Bassam Shazali as Pateeli/Chapta
- Hammad Siddiqui as Gutka/Shikra
- Joel Frenzer as Gabru

== Production ==
=== Development ===
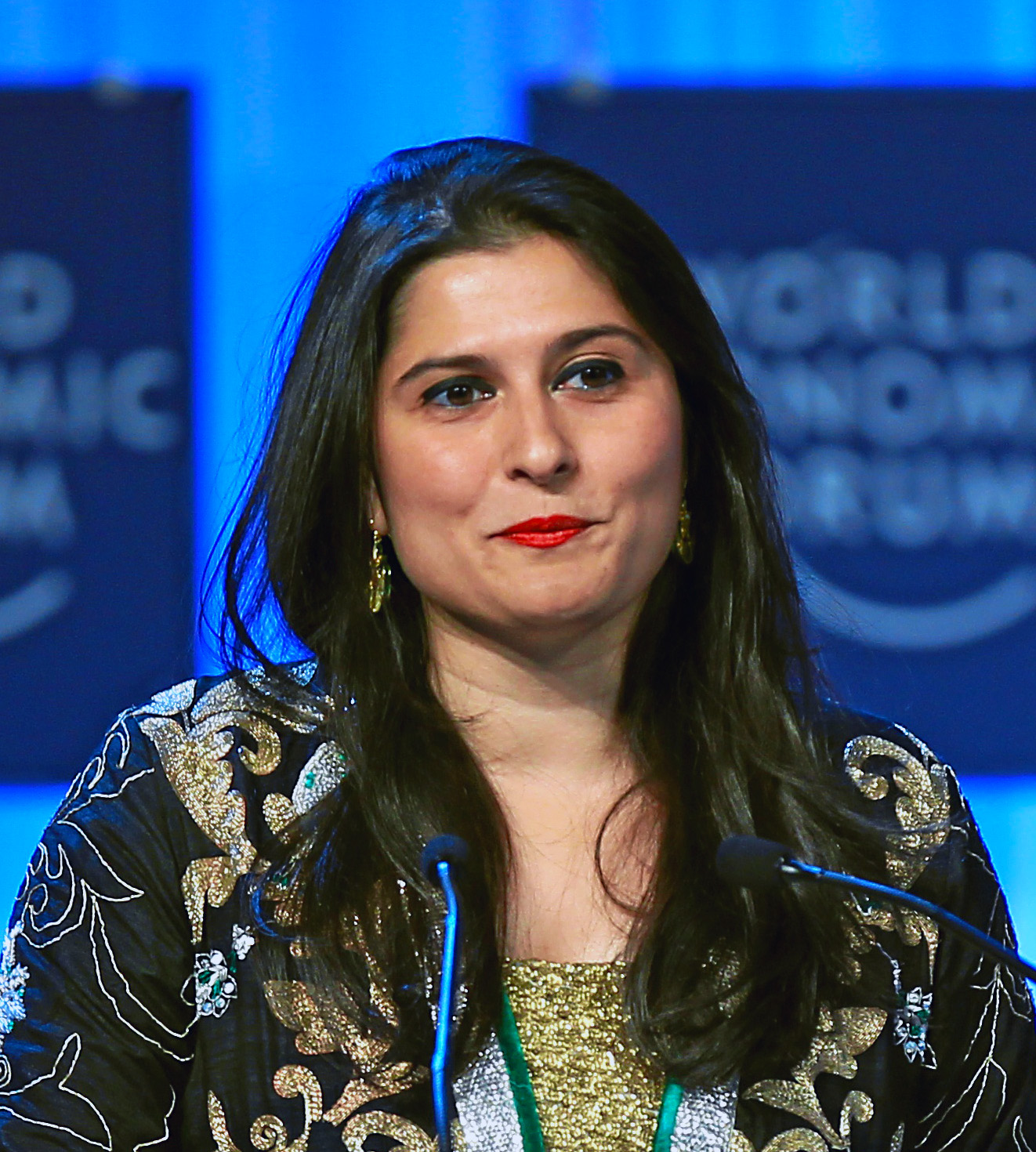
Director and producer Sharmeen Obaid-Chinoy

On 11 September 2014, ARY Films and SOC Films announced a joint venture company by the name of Waadi Animations. Their intention was to produce animated content, including feature films, and announced that their debut project was 3 Bahadur. Sharmeen Obaid Chinoy, CEO Waadi Animation said, "This partnership will allow us to create animated super heroes and heroines that will make us laugh and cry and, most importantly, entertain. We all have an inner child and we will attempt to nurture the imagination of that child at Waadi Animations." At the first look event of the film in Nueplex Cinemas Karachi, the creative director Sharmeen Obaid Chinoy revealed that "[A]lmost three years ago, I had an intense desire to create an animated feature in Pakistan, which would appeal to both children and adults alike. I have to admit, venturing into the realm of animation was unchartered [sic] territory for my team and I, but everyone quickly warmed up to the idea and we began learning the ropes and assembling a team of some of the best animators in the country to work with us. We are proud to announce and share the fruit of our hard work and efforts; Pakistan's first animated feature film." Sharmeen Obaid stated that "3 Bahadur is not just a movie. It is a movement. The message we're sending with this film is that 'We shall overcome.' Like these three kids (film main characters), we can face the challenges that come our way. You don't need to be a superhero. You are a superhero." The film is produced entirely in Pakistan, based in a fictional town named Roshan Basti (town of light).

=== Casting ===
On 12 September 2014, it was announced that Zuhab Khan would play the lead role in the film, while Muneeba Yaseen and Hanzala Shahid were in early talks to join the cast. On 22 September 2014, Behroze Sabzwari, Alyy Khan, Abu Rashid Khan, Kulsoom Aftab Ahmed, Farhan Qureshi, Mustafa Changazi, Badar Qureshi, Nadir Siddiqui, Wasif Arshad and Khalid Ahmed were also in final talks to join the film, Bassam Shazali was added to the cast, playing Pateeli and Chapta and on 26 September 2014, Hammad Siddiqui and Joel Frenzer joined the cast of the film, playing Gutka, Shikra and Gabru.

=== Sound and music ===
3 Bahadur's sound was designed by Dan Golden and mixed by John Bowen. The original score was composed by John Angier with additional vocals by Jacqueline Angier. The foley artist was Soundsquare. The film's soundtrack is composed, sung and produced by Shiraz Uppal at SU Studios in Lahore. The video of theme song directed by Nadir Siddiqui, Husain Qaizar and produced by Wasif Arshad was released on April 20, 2015. The lyrics of the title track were written by Shakeel Sohail.

=== Animation ===
The movie was done in 3D computer animation. Waadi Animations has engineers on its staff who understand the physics of sound and light and how these elements will affect movement in characters.

== Soundtrack ==
- Title song - sung by Shiraz Uppal
- 3 Bahadur - By Shiraz Uppal
- Rauneqain - sung by Shiraz Uppal
- Raunaqein - By Shiraz Uppal
- All Music - Composed by John Angier

== Release ==
3 Bahadur was premiered in Karachi on May 19, 2015. The film was released nationwide by ARY Films on May 22, 2015. It was also screened at the first-ever Pakistan Film Festival in New York City, held from December 3–4, 2016, at the Asia Society.

=== Marketing ===
The first look teaser trailer of film was revealed by Salman Iqbal (CEO ARY) and Sharmeen Obaid Chinoy in a special screening at 1st ARY Film Awards. On 23 December, the film trailer was also premiered at a press event held at Nueplex Cinemas Karachi where the Director of Waadi Animations, Salman Iqbal stated that "We are proud to be bringing the first animated feature film 3 Bahadur under the banner of Waadi Animations, aimed at bringing quality entertainment to our little cinema fans. 3 Bahadur will definitely set a culture of making inspirational movies for children in Pakistan" The Film Director, Sharmeen Obaid Chinoy commented "I believe that 3 Bahadur is going to be groundbreaking because it provides quality entertainment for the whole family." On 27 March 2015 full-length theatrical trailer was revealed on ARY Digital Network by Waadi Animations. The trailer was also screened on several cinema screens from April onwards. Waadi Animations (joint venture by SOC Films and ARY Films), announced their core partners and synergies for the film to be released by ARY Films. English Biscuit Manufacturers (EBM) Peek Freans is the lead sponsor of the film. Other sponsors are Safeguard and McDonald's. EBM will also be introducing various activities around the movie; for instance, film branded packaging for Gluco (biscuit) and a themed web based interactive activity by RIO (biscuit). Head of marketing at EBM, Zulfiqar A. Ansari said "We are proud to be associated with this project. The movie brings out a powerful message for children, that, each one of them has unique abilities and strengths through which they can make positive contribution to the society and that EBM's brands communicate as well." 3 Bahadur started a promotional campaign on 19 January 2015 by publishing comics every Saturday in DAWN's Young World section. An official website was launched in April 2015 website featuring exclusive content including character sketches, BTS videos, images and weekly comic strips.

=== Video game ===
A video game based on the film with same title, developed by Pi Labs in collaboration with Artboard, was released on 30 April 2015 for Android and later for iOS.

== Reception ==
=== Box office ===
The movie opened better on Friday with day one collecting Rs. 3 million (US$11,000). Movie grew around 10% on Day two collecting Rs. 4 million (US$14,000) surpassing Good Morning Karachi and became second-highest-grossing Pakistani film of 2015 after Jalaibee. The movie collected Rs. 6 million (US$21,000) on Sunday taking the three-day weekend to Rs. 12.5 million (US$45,000). The film collected Rs. 2 million (US$7,200) on Monday, Rs. 1.9 million (US$6,800) on Tuesday, Rs. 1.8 million (US$6,400) on Wednesday and Rs. 1.6 million (US$5,700) on Thursday. At the end of week one, the film did business of Rs. 3.5 million (US$13,000) comparative to previous days, taking its one-week total to Rs. 23.8 million (US$85,000). The film added Rs. 20 million (US$72,000) at the end of the second week to the total of Rs. 46.3 million (US$170,000) and became highest grossing Pakistani animated film breaking the previous record of Rio 2 which collected Rs. 45 million (US$160,000). The film surpassed Main Hoon Shahid Afridi after collecting Rs. 1.38 crore (US$49,000) in third week of its release, taking 21 days total to Rs. 5.41 crore (US$190,000). The fourth week business was Rs. 6 million (US$21,000). Film got effected by Ramadan in 5th and 6th week as film collected Rs. 2.5 million (US$8,900) in these two weeks combined taking 6 Weeks total to Rs. 65 million (US$230,000). The film completed its 50-day run in theaters with total collection reaching Rs. 6.63 crore (US$240,000)

=== Critical response ===
Rafay Mahmood of The Express Tribune rated the film 3 out of 5 stars and given the verdict as, "3 Bahadur has funny and frightening moments for children. The use of Urdu language may be the only saviour if they enter expecting something similar to Madagascar or Rio." Mehreen Hasan of DAWN.com wrote "3 Bahadur did half the job in setting the stage for deeper exploration of evil, but barely addresses its root causes or the possibility of reform. Maybe the sequel will address these angles, but it's a lesson delayed." Zeeshan Mahmood of Galaxy Lollywood rated 4 out 5 stars and verdicts as "3 Bahadur is a brave, intelligent and sincere effort by Waadi Animations, ARY Films and Sharmeen Obaid Chinoy and it will, hopefully, set a trend of making animated films and especially films for the kids in Pakistan. Being first animated feature film for kids, it deserves all the credit and praise ignoring its shortfalls. 3 Bahadur is a gift for the kids and it is expected from the parents to take them to the cinemas and enjoy it with them." Faizan Ahmed or brandsynario rated it 7 out of 10 and gave the verdict, "Being the first Pakistani animated feature film, 3 Bahadur had a lot to prove. It was quite a burden, expectations were high and the film delivers what was expected. The effort of introducing a Pakistani animated film should be applauded and cherished. Children can easily relate to the main characters. Overall it is a commendable effort and for the kids, a must watch." Hala Syed of hip reviewed the film and gave the verdict as "Sneakily perceptive 3 Bahadur has a charm and delicacy that will appeal to everyone. Children will find something to relate to and adults will be reminded of what it is like to be a kid."

== Sequel ==
As per report, after success of 3 Bahadur at box office the filmmakers intend to release a sequel by December 2016. In November 2015, it was officially announced by director that 3 Bahadur will return with a sequel in 2016. Director said: "3 Bahadur was a very special project for me because it inculcated a sense of pride and ownership in Pakistani children. Now, with 3 Bahadur Part 2, I want to make sure that Saadi, Kamil and Amna inspire bravery and fearlessness in every child across the country." The first look of sequel was unveiled in February 2016, under the title 3 Bahadur: The Revenge of Baba Balaam, the film cast included Fahad Mustafa, Sarwat Gilani, Ahmed Ali Butt, Zeba Shahnaz and Ali Gul Pir. The film was released on 15 December 2016.

== See also ==
- List of highest-grossing Pakistani films
- List of Pakistani animated films
- List of Pakistani films of 2015
