= Sanam Baloch =

Pakistani actress and television presenter

Sanam Baloch صنم بلوچ
- Born: 14 July 1986 (age 40); Karachi, Sindh, Pakistan
- Education: University of Karachi
- Occupations: Actress; television presenter
- Years active: 2007-2019
- Known for: Dastaan, Durr-e-Shehwar, Ek Thi Marium
- Spouse: Abdullah Farhatullah (m. 2013; div. 2018) Shahzad Ali Jatoi (m. 2020)
- Children: 1
- Parents: Ghulam Murtaza Baloch (father); Maria Baloch (mother)
- Relatives: Sabreen Hisbani (sister); Sindhyar Baloch (nephew)
- Awards: Pakistan Media Award; Lux Style Awards

Sanam Baloch Hisbani or Jatoi (Urdu: صنم بلوچ, Sindhi: صنم بلوچ جتوئي) (born 14 July 1986) credited as Sanam Baloch is a Pakistani actress and television presenter. She has hosted various television shows, such as Sanam Small Room on KTN and The Morning Show with Sanam Baloch on Samaa TV. As an actress, she has starred in critically acclaimed drama series, such as Dastaan (2010) and Durr-e-Shehwar (2012).

== Personal life ==
Sanam was born in a Sindhi Baloch family. She married her colleague Abdullah Farhatullah on 12 October 2013 in a simple Nikah ceremony in Karachi. They met while working for Samaa TV and had been good friends for a long time. Upon her marriage, Baloch changed her name to Sanam Abdullah. Baloch's PR team dismissed rumors of a divorce in April 2018.

In October 2018, Baloch confirmed that she and Abdullah had separated. Although they maintain a cordial relationship, they are no longer friends.

In August 2020, Baloch confirmed the news about her second marriage with Shahzad Ali Jatoi. Sanam has a daughter.

== Career ==
Baloch began her career as a talk show anchor on Sindhi television channel KTN. She hosted two shows, Sanam Small Room and Diyoo on KTN. Her acting debut was long play Kalaq opposite Fahad Mustafa. Baloch went bald to portray the role according to the requirement. She portrayed Rija in the Ramadan special romantic-coemdy Chaudhween Ka Chand. She then portrayed Noorulain Aneez, an innocent orphan in the drama Noorpur Ki Rani, an adaptation of Daphne Du Maurier's Rebecca. For her performance, she received her first ever award nomination, Best Television Actress - Satellite at the 9th Lux Style Awards.

She has also performed in Urdu and Sindhi language music videos. Baloch paired opposite Fawad Khan in the period-drama Dastaan. Based on Razia Butt's novel Bano, Baloch portrayed the eponymous character, a supporter of Pakistan movement whose life is shattered by the Partition of India. Taneeya Hasan of The Express Tribune termed her performance along with Khan's performance as "a remarkable job". The performance earned her Best Drama Actress award at the 2nd Pakistan Media Awards and a nomination of Best Television Actress - Satellite at the 10th Lux Style Awards. In a 2013 interview, Baloch named the portrayal she considered her "most memorable and special" performance when asked about her work. The same year, she depicted a medical student hails from a poor family in the drama Daam. While writing for Dawn, a reviewer found that she "does act well" and "carries herself well and after Doraha, once again comes up with a stellar performance."

Her first role in 2011 was in the drama Zindagi Dhoop Tum Ghana Saya, where she depicted a married woman who is widowed suddenly and faces numerous challenges. Dawn hailed her as "revelation" and opined that, "After Daam and Chemistry, she once again puts in a perfect performance."

Baloch had her first role of 2012 in the drama Durr-e-Shehwar, as the eponymous newly-wed bride navigating the complexities of the married life. While praising her performance, Usman Ghafoor of The News on Sunday opined that she "looks pretty and distressed as Shahwar is supposed to". The same year, Baloch played a victim of domestic abuse from a rural background in the drama Aik Thi Paaro. She then depicted the dual roles of Roshan Ara and Sitara in the romance Roshan Sitara, opposite Affan Waheed and Moammar Rana respectively. In a review by Mag The Weekly, her on-screen pairing with Rana was panned.

Her next role was of a victim of domestic abuse in social-drama Kankar. Farahnaz Moazzam of the Express Tribune stated that she "depicted a battered woman’s experience beautifully".

She took no acting projects for the following three years due to her commitment to hosting, The Morning Show on ARY News. In 2016, she returned to acting and portrayed the fighter pilot Marium Mukhtiar in the biographical television-film Ek Thi Marium.

Baloch then appeared in her only project of 2017 in the drama Teri Raza as the callow Suhana of an upper-class but religious background. DAWN Images readers and critics voted her portrayal as the "most annoying TV character", garnering the highest votes.

In 2019, she starred in the drama Khaas as a victim of emotional abuse at the hands of her narcissistic husband, played by Ali Rehman Khan. While reviewing her and Khan's performances, Buraq Shabbir of The News International found that they has done "a commendable job" and noted their "respective roles that break away from cliched portrayals." For her performance, Baloch received a Best Television Actress nomination at the 1st Pakistan International Screen Awards.

She hosted the morning show Morning with Hum on Hum TV. In 2011, she began hosting Samaa TV's morning show Subh Saverey Samaa Ke Saath, a role she held for three years. She married Abdullah Farhatullah, also a Samaa TV show host. She then joined ARY News, hosting their morning show from 2014 to 2018. Later, she rejoined Samaa TV, hosting the morning show until its conclusion in 2019.

Pakistani films like Bin Roye and Balu Mahi and many others was also offered to Sanam Baloch. In fact, she had signed Bin Roye as well but later she cancelled the contract with Hum TV in lieu of her morning show with ARY News and her wedding.

Baloch is one of the highest-paid actresses of Pakistan.

== Television ==
| Year | Title | Role | Notes |
|---|---|---|---|
| 2008 | Kaalaq | Sidra Mohsin | Television film |
| 2008 | Abhi Abhi | Noor Bano | |
| 2008 | Doraha | Shahla | |
| 2008 | Chaudhween Ka Chand | Rija | |
| 2009 | Mannchalay | Mitthu | |
| 2009 | Noorpur Ki Rani | Noor ul Ain Aneez "Noorie" | |
| 2009 | Morning with Hum | Host | Talk show |
| 2010 | Zeenat Bint-e-Sakina Hazir Ho | Zeenat | |
| 2010 | Dastaan | Bano/ Sundar Kaur | |
| 2010 | Daam | Zara Hidayatullah | |
| 2010 | Chemistry | Raina | |
| 2011 | Zindagi Dhoop Tum Ghana Saya | Hira | |
| 2011 | Sehra Teri Pyas | Faiza Ali Shah | |
| 2011 | Akbari Asghari | Akbari "Becky" | |
| 2011 | Kuch Pyar Ka Pagalpan | Kiran | |
| 2011-2014 | Subh Saverey Samaa Ke Saath | Host | Morning Show (season 01) |
| 2012 | Nadamat | Dr. Tania | |
| 2012 | Ek Thi Parro | Parro | |
| 2012 | Roshan Sitara | Roshan Ara / Sitara | |
| 2012 | Durr-e-Shehwar | Durr-e-Shahwar | |
| 2013 | Kankar | Kiran | |
| 2014–2018 | The Morning Show | Host | Morning show |
| 2016 | Ek Thi Marium | Marium Mukhtiar | Television film |
| 2017 | Teri Raza | Suhana | |
| 2018–2019 | Subh Saverey Samaa Ke Saath 2 | Host | Morning Show on Samaa TV (season 02) |
| 2019 | Khaas | Saba Faraz | |

=== Music videos ===
- Shahnila Ali's jogi music video (2006).
- Najaf Ali's Choodiyun music video (2008).
- Amanat Ali's Thumri music video (2010).

== Awards and nominations ==
| Year | Awards | Work | Category | Result | Ref. |
|---|---|---|---|---|---|
| 2011 | Pakistan Media Awards | Best Drama Actress | Dastaan | Won | |
| 2010 | Lux Style Awards | Best Television Actress (Satellite) | Noorpur Ki Rani | Nominated | |
| 2011 | Lux Style Awards | Best Television Actress (Satellite) | Dastaan | Nominated | |
| 2012 | Lux Style Awards | Best Television Actress (Terrestrial) | Sehra Teri Pyas | Won | |
| 2013 | Hum Awards | Best Actress | Roshan Sitara | Nominated | |
| 2014 | Hum Awards | Best Actress | Kankar | Nominated | |
| 2014 | Hum Awards | Best Actress Popular | Kankar | Nominated | |
| 2014 | Hum Awards | Best Onscreen Couple Popular | Kankar | Nominated | |
| 2014 | Hum Awards | Best Onscreen Couple | Kankar | Nominated | |
| 2020 | Pakistan International Screen Awards | Best Television Actress | Khaas | Nominated | |
