= Aghaz-e-safar =

- Also known as: Aghaz e Safar
- Directed by: Sharmeen Obaid Chinoy
- Presented by: Fakhr-e-Alam
- Country of origin: Pakistan
- Original language: Urdu
- No. of seasons: 1
- No. of episodes: 12

Production
- Running time: 40 - 60 minutes
- Production company: SOC Films

Original release
- Network: Aaj Television
- Release: 13 April 2014 – 2014

Aghaz-e-Safar (English: The Beginning of a Journey) is a Pakistani television talk show that aired on Aaj Television on 13 April 2014. It is hosted by Fakhr-e-Alam and directed by award-winning filmmaker and journalist Sharmeen Obaid Chinoy. The show highlights pressing social issues prevalent in Pakistan such as child abuse, labor rights, medical malpractice, sexual harassment, land grabbing, minority rights, gun control, domestic violence, challenges faced by people with disabilities, water crisis, and the failing education system in one-hour long episodes through short form documentaries, in-studio interviews and expert analysis. The show is the first of its kind to air in Pakistan.

The primary language of the show is Urdu and online versions of the episodes have been subtitled in English. It was Sharmeen Obaid Chinoy’s first venture into Pakistani television.

== Production ==
=== Concept ===
The concept of Aghaz-e-Safar is reflected in its tag line "Don’t be a problem, be an example". On the launch of the show, Sharmeen Obaid Chinoy was quoted as saying, "I’ve always made films that have made people feel uncomfortable. I’m hoping to make Pakistani audiences uncomfortable. It’s time we have these uncomfortable conversations."

Through hard-hitting and nuanced storytelling, Aghaz-e-Safar addresses taboo topics that have long been suppressed in Pakistan. The content of the show is based on the plight of the common Pakistani. In an interview with MAG magazine Sharmeen Obaid Chinoy stated, "Pakistanis talk about politics, politics and politics, but has politics of the country ever helped the common man?"

The show also includes comparisons made with other regional countries such as Bangladesh, India and Sri Lanka. The show aims to inspire and enlighten audiences to be their own change makers. The show does not only talk about issues faced by the people in Pakistan but it also suggests solutions to those problems.

=== Development ===
Aghaz-e-Safar was put together through the collaborative efforts of SOC Films, a production house run by Sharmeen Obaid Chinoy, and Aaj Television. Over a span of two years, the team of SOC Films travelled across Pakistan to bring engaging stories to the attention of the people of Pakistan. They travelled to over 25 cities and collected over 100 untold narratives. The stories vary from small villages to urban centres and reflect the multiplicity of Pakistan.

The team identified 12 pressing issues faced by Pakistan then. Each episode of Aghaz-e-Safar explores one of these problems through firsthand narratives, in-studio interviews and expert analysis. The show is hosted by television personality and chairman of the Sindh Board of Film Censors, Fakhr-e-Alam.

In addition to the television show, Aghaz-e-Safar has a robust website which serves as a platform for dialogue by creating a space that allows Pakistanis to discuss their problems comfortably.

Sharmeen Obaid-Chinoy was inspired to venture into Pakistani television after noticing a significant lack of sensible TV in the country. On the launch of the show, Sharmeen Obaid Chinoy said, "For too long our television screens have been taken over by politicians talking about politics and in that I feel the stories of the people has been lost."

=== Theme song ===
The OST of Aghaz-e-Safar was composed by Khawar Jawad and performed by Shahram Azhar. The song was shot by SOC Films in different regions of Pakistan. The lyrics serve to encourage Pakistanis to unite and embark on a collective journey towards a brighter Pakistan.

== Broadcast ==
=== Airing ===
Aghaz-e-Safar premiered on 13 April 2014 and was telecast on Sundays at 8pm PKT thereafter on Aaj News, a satellite news channel. Aaj provided prime time slot to the show. Talking about the idea behind the program Sharmeen said, "For too long our television screens have been taken over by politicians talking about politics and in that I feel the stories of the people has been lost."

The show is scheduled for repeat telecasts throughout the week: Mondays at 3pm (PKT), Wednesdays at 5pm (PKT), Thursdays at 10pm (PKT), and Sundays at 10am (PKT).

=== Sponsors ===
The show was presented and sponsored by Aquafina. Other associate sponsors included Pakistan Cables and Pakistan Telecommunication Company Ltd.

== Marketing ==
=== Promotions ===
The first teaser of the show was premiered on Dailymotion on 22 March 2014. A total of four teasers featuring Sharmeen Obaid Chinoy were released. The final teaser, published on Dailymotion on 11 April 2014 introduced Fakhr-e-Alam as the host.

The theme song of the show was released on radio channels including CityFM89 and FM91 across Pakistan on 23 March 2014 on Pakistan Day.

== Reception ==
=== Critical response ===
The show was received positively. Reviews by several news and media organizations praised Sharmeen Obaid Chinoy for her effort in highlighting taboo issues that had long been suppressed in Pakistan. Sehrish Butt of Media Blinks stated, "It will be huge refuge for sensible TV audience who is totally sick of the bizarre political talk shows or even worse i.e. sickening Turkish soaps. It was high time that someone actually talked about ‘real’ social problems instead of making masala shows in the name of social responsibility."

In her review, journalist and novelist Bina Shah stated, "It's strong, heady stuff. We've never discussed issues with such openness on such a platform before. It's daring, and it won't be easy to take. But I'd like to venture that it is exactly what we need."

The show was also praised for its format and content. Madeeha Syed of Dawn News wrote, "Some of the stories lay testament to the resilience of the human spirit and are inspiring" and "almost everyone who left the auditorium described being moved by the stories."

Ambreem Asim and Muhammad Rahat Hussain for MAG magazine wrote, "Every episode of the show has a negative and positive side. While one story reveals what happens when the system fails, the other reveals what happens when the system works, concluding on a positive note by giving hope."

Madeeha Syed also praised the show for its in-depth research. She wrote, "The show focuses heavily on facts, information, comparisons, and analyses and there is no room left for error."

=== Viewers’ response ===
The show was well received by viewers describing it as "informative, thought-provoking and an excellent forum for awareness" making it "one of those shows which justifies the existence of television as a medium". Viewers are praised the show for its "fabulous pre-recording research" and "courage in bringing up hushed-down issues".

== Episodes ==
| Episode | Title | Topic | Original air date | TV rating (overall) |
|---|---|---|---|---|
| 1 | Protect our future | Child abuse | 13 April 2014 | 0.26 |
| 2 | United we bargain, divided we fall | Labour rights | 20 April 2014 | |
| 3 | Caring for all | Medical malpractice | 27 April 2014 | |
| 4 | Reclaiming our space | Sexual harassment and rape | 4 May 2014 | 0.26 |
| 5 | Up for Grabs | Land grabbing | 18 May 2014 | 0.30 |
| 6 | | Minorities | | |
| 7 | | Gun Control | | |
| 8 | | Domestic Violence | | |
| 9 | | Disabilities | | |
| 10 | | Water | | |
| 11 | | Unsung Heroes | | |
| 12 | | Education | | |
