= Song of Lahore =

- Film poster
- Directed by: Sharmeen Obaid-Chinoy; Andy Schocken
- Produced by: Sharmeen Obaid-Chinoy; Andy Schocken
- Music by: The Sachal Ensemble, Wynton Marsalis and Jazz at Lincoln Center Orchestra
- Distributed by: Broad Green Pictures
- Release dates: April 18, 2015 (Tribeca Film Festival); November 13, 2015
- Running time: 82 minutes
- Country: United States
- Language: English

Song of Lahore is a documentary film directed by Sharmeen Obaid-Chinoy and Andy Schocken. The film follows a group of musicians as they travel from their home in Pakistan to New York City to perform at Lincoln Center.

== Premiere ==
The film had its world premiere at the Tribeca Film Festival on April 18, 2015. The limited release was set for November 13, 2015.

Actor Faran Tahir and comedian Saad Haroon attended the premiere of the film. Following the screening, the film received a standing ovation.

== Synopsis ==
Song of Lahore tells the story of Sachal Studios, a Pakistani music group who prepare for a New York City performance after being invited by Wynton Marsalis. They rehearse with Marsalis' band, the Jazz, then take the stage together at Lincoln Center.

== Cast ==
- Nijat Ali
- Izzat Majeed
- Saleem Khan

== Reception ==
On review aggregator website Rotten Tomatoes the film has an approval rating of 100% based on 17 critics, with an average rating of 7.1/10. On Metacritic, the film have an above average score of 69 out of 100 based on 6 critics, indicating "generally favorable reviews".

John DeFore of The Hollywood Reporter called the film "likeable if not especially vibrant doc[umentary]".

According to Ronnie Scheib of Variety, the documentary was "excellent".
