= A Girl in the River: The Price of Forgiveness =

- Film poster
- Directed by: Sharmeen Obaid-Chinoy
- Produced by: Tina Brown
- Production companies: SOC Films; HBO Documentary Films
- Distributed by: HBO
- Release date: October 28, 2015
- Running time: 40 minutes
- Countries: US; Pakistan
- Languages: English; Punjabi

A Girl in the River: The Price of Forgiveness (Urdu: دریا میں ایک لڑکی: معافی کی قیمت) is a 2015 documentary film directed by Sharmeen Obaid-Chinoy about honor killings in Pakistan. The film is produced by Tina Brown and Sheila Nevins in collaboration with HBO Documentary Films. A Girl in the River was edited by Geof Bartz, A.C.E.

A Girl in the River earned widespread critical acclaim and won Best Documentary Short Film at the 88th Academy Awards.

== Synopsis ==
The documentary follows the story of a nineteen-year-old girl who survives an honor killing attempt by her father and uncle. The protagonist has a solid stance on not forgiving her attackers, but the public pressures her into forgiving. By doing that, the attackers are freed and can return home.

== Release ==
The film was released on October 28, 2015, and had its worldwide premiere on HBO on March 7, 2016.

== Reaction ==
The movie received mixed reviews in Pakistan.

It won the Oscar for Best Documentary and convinced the Pakistani government to review its laws on honor killings.

== Awards and nominations ==
Awards
Award	Date of ceremony	Category	Recipients and nominees	Result
Academy Award	February 28, 2016	Best Documentary Short	Sharmeen Obaid Chinoy	Won
