= Teri Raza (TV series) =

Pakistani television series

- Left to right: Shehroz Sabzwari, Sanam Baloch, Sarmad Khoosat
- Genre: Family drama Romantic drama
- Written by: Naila Ansari
- Directed by: Aabis Raza
- Starring: Sanam Baloch; Sarmad Khoosat; Shehroz Sabzwari
- Theme music composer: Waqar Ali
- Country of origin: Pakistan
- Original language: Urdu
- No. of seasons: 1
- No. of episodes: 31

Production
- Camera setup: Multi-camera setup

Original release
- Network: ARY Digital
- Release: 8 July 2017 – 1 February 2018

Teri Raza (Urdu: تیری رضا, lit. 'Your Pleasure') is a Pakistani television series that first aired on ARY Digital on 8 July 2017 and ended on 2 February 2018. It was produced by Fahad Mustafa and Dr. Ali Kazmi under their banner Big Bang Entertainment.

== Plot ==
Teri Raza centers on Suhana, a young college student in love with her chauvinist classmate Rameez. Her parents arrange a marriage for her with her older, well-settled relative, Imtiaz, after an Istikhara is performed by her grandmother. Suhana initially resists but eventually agrees to the marriage when Rameez's careless attitude leads her to believe he is not serious about their relationship. After marrying Imtiaz, Suhana cannot adjust to her new life and remains in love with Rameez. Imtiaz, realizing her feelings, divorces her, and she returns to Rameez. Due to his grandmother mother's pressure, Imtiaz marries her colleague Seema, leading Suhana to move on. Thus, she marries Rameez despite the opposition of her family who cut the ties with her after her decision. Her marriage suufers due to chauvinism of Rameez and his ture nature. At this turbulent stage, Suhana then learns that Imtiaz still loves her.

== Cast ==
- Sanam Baloch as Suhana
- Sarmad Khoosat as Imtiaz
- Shehroz Sabzwari as Rameez
- Shaheen Khan as Tallat: Suhana's mother
- Tanveer Jamal as Zafar: Suhana's father
- Tara Mahmood as Sara: Rameez's mother
- Saife Hassan as Rameez's father
- Ayesha Khan as Suhana's grandmother
- Hajra Yamin as Jeena: Imtiaz's sister
- Shamim Hilaly as Sitara: Imtiaz's mother and Suhana's aunt

== Soundtrack ==
"Teri Raza"

Song by Ali Sethi
- Language: Urdu
- Released: 30 May 2018
- Recorded: 2018
- Genre: Television soundtrack
- Length: 4:45
- Label: ARY Digital
- Composer: Ghulam Qadir Pundit
- Lyricist: Hafeez Hoshiyarpuri

Music video
- "Teri Raza" on YouTube

The music was composed by Ghulam Qadir Pundit with lyrics by Hafeez Hoshiyarpuri.

=== Track listing ===
All lyrics are written by Ghulam Qadir Pundit; all music is composed by Mad Music.

No.	Title	Artist(s)	Length
1.	""Mohabbat Karne Wale""	Ali Sethi	4:45

== Reception ==
=== Critical reception ===
The series was received mixed reviews, with critics panning characterisation of the female lead. The character received the highest votes in the "most annoying TV character" category by critics and readers of the DAWN Images.

The series was panned in the year-ender articles of several publications, with Sadaf Haider of DAWN Images criticised characterisation of Suhana's character, Buraq Shabbir of The News International noted the inconsistent treatment of the characters, and Mahwash Badar of The Express Tribune opined that the "story seems very clichéd but the dialogues are beautiful and the story keeps shifting in and out of intrigue to keep the audience hooked".
