= Mera Yaqeen =

- Genre: Romance; Drama
- Written by: Seema Munaf
- Directed by: Sarmad Khoosat
- Starring: Savera Nadeem; Faisal Qureshi; Nimra Bucha
- Country of origin: Pakistan
- Original language: Urdu

Production
- Producers: Asif Raza Mir; Babar Javed
- Production location: Karachi
- Running time: Approx. 40 minutes
- Production company: A&B Entertainment

Original release
- Network: ARY Digital
- Release: 2012

Mera Yaqeen(Urdu: میرا یقین, lit. 'My Belief') is a 2012 Pakistani drama serial aired on ARY Digital. The serial is directed by Sarmad Khoosat and written by Seema Munaf. Starring Faisal Qureshi, Savera Nadeem, Nimra Bucha and Farhan Ali Agha, it was a production of A&B Entertainment. The drama serial follows the life of a happily married couple who are happy in their life until they meet with a disaster.

== Cast ==
- Faisal Qureshi
- Savera Nadeem
- Nimra Bucha
- Zaheen Tahira
- Shehryar Zaidi
- Maria Zahid
- Naveen Waqar
- Farhan Ally Agha
- Sami Sani

== Reception ==
The series gathered praise for performances of the lead cast but received negative reviews due to storyline.

== Accolades ==
Year	Awards	Category	Recipient(s)/ nominee(s)	Result	Ref.
2012	Lux Style Awards	Best TV Play – Satellite	Mera Yaqeen	Nominated	
