= Sarmad Khoosat =

Pakistani actor (born 1979)

- سرمد کھوسٹ
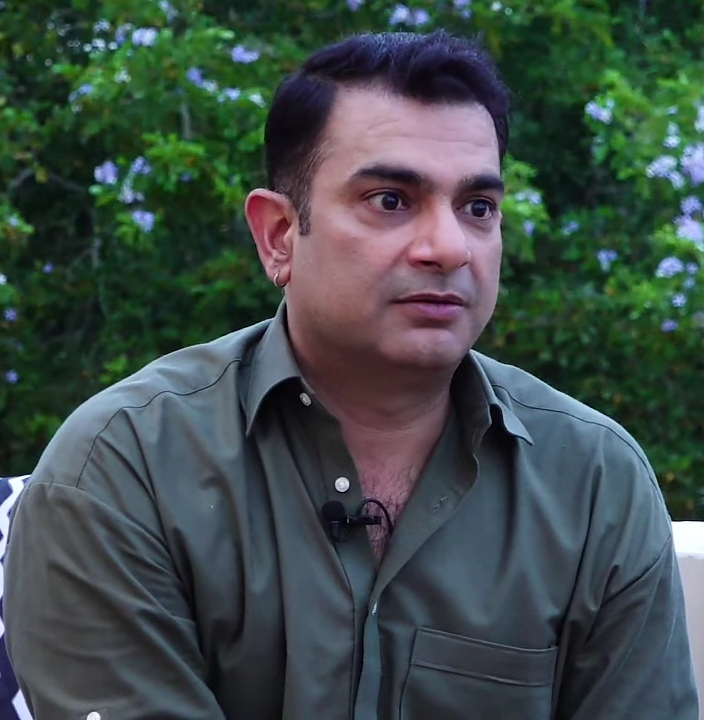
- Khoosat in 2022
- Born: 7 May 1979 (age 47); Lahore, Punjab, Pakistan
- Occupations: Actor; Film/TV director; Film/TV producer; Screenwriter
- Years active: 2001–Present
- Parent(s): Irfan Khoosat (father); Zahida Butt (mother); Kanwal Khoosat (sister)

Sarmad Sultan Khoosat (Urdu: سرمد سلطان کھوسٹ, born 7 May 1979) is a Pakistani actor, director, producer, and screenwriter. Mainly known for his work as a director and actor in both cinema and television, Khoosat has directed the super-hit TV dramas Humsafar (2011) and Shehr-e-Zaat (2012).

The son of actor-comedian Irfan Khoosat, he is considered one of the best South Asian filmmakers with his 2019 film Zindagi Tamasha being selected as Pakistan's entry for the Best International Feature Film at the 93rd Academy Awards. The film also premiered at the 24th Busan International Film Festival under the section 'A Window on Asian Cinema' where it won the Kim Ji-Seok Award. The film also won multiple awards at the 6th Asian World Film Festival. He has also been associated with several critically acclaimed Pakistani films, including Joyland, Kamli (both 2022) and Lali (2026), further cementing his reputation as a prominent figure in contemporary Pakistani cinema. He also portrayed the role of Saadat Hasan Manto in his film Manto (2015).

== Early life and education ==
He is the son of veteran TV and film actor, producer and comedian Irfan Khoosat and Zahida Butt, a PTV newscaster. His sister Kanwal Khoosat is also a director, screenwriter and actress.

Academically, he graduated from Government College University, Lahore and earned a master's degree in psychology and a gold medal. He also was a member of the Debating Kutta Society of GCU.

== Career ==
He rose to prominence in 2001 when he wrote, directed, and acted in the sitcom Shashlik, which ran for over three years on PTV. It was followed by another sitcom on Indus TV, Two Aur Two Chaar, with almost the same cast members, including Nadia Afgan, Khoosat's father Irfan Khoosat, and Khoosat himself.

Sarmad then directed a series of tele-films for Geo TV, Tamasha Ghar, in 2003, the screenwriter Saji Gul basing the work on themes dealing with subconscious desires and fears (inspired by the Freudian school of psychology).

He later directed Bano Qudsia's written Piya Naam Ka Diya in 2007, in which he acted opposite filmstar Saima Noor and Erum Akhtar. Khoosat then served as executive director for a soap serial named Mujhe Apna Naam-o-Nishan Milay, directed by his sister Kanwal Khoosat. In the same year, he directed the murder-mystery Qatil which was produced by Mehreen Jabbar, whom he considered among her mentors.

Khoosat then directed Kalmoohi, an adaptation of Rabindranath Tagore's Chokher Bali, which began airing on PTV in early 2010, and also got good reviews. In 2011, he gained significant prominence and acclaim with the TV drama Pani Jaisa Piyar that aired on Hum TV. It won him the best director award for it on LUX Style Awards. He directed Jal Pari, which was aired on Geo Entertainment. He went on to direct Humsafar for Hum TV, which became an overnight success. His spiritual romantic serial Shehr-e-Zaat was especially popular with women.

He conducted a workshop at the Lahore University of Management Sciences's annual amateur film festival in June 2011.

Khoosat directed episodes for Faseele Jaan Se Aagay and Ashk. He also directed the remake of the original Pakistani film, Aina, as a telefilm. In 2015, he completed shooting feature film Manto and its television adaptation.

In October 2018, he delivered a 24-hour-long live act, No Time To Sleep, enacting the last 24 hours of a death row prisoner's life, a performance which earned him critical appreciation. As of October 2018, he wrote the script for Saqib Malik's upcoming production Ajnabee Sheher Main, while he has two upcoming feature films as director, writing one as well.

His 2019 feature film Zindagi Tamasha won the Kim Jin Seok award at the 24th Busan International Film Festival as well as the Best Film and Best Actor at the Asian World Film Festival 2021. Despite its critical acclaim, the film release was halted in 2020 by the notorious party, TLP, which called for it to be censored. Despite cleared for release by the authorities, Khoosat continued to receive death threats calling for the film to be banned. It was selected as Pakistan's entry for the Best International Feature Film at the 93rd Academy Awards, but was not nominated. The film was then eventually released on YouTube on 4 August 2023.

In 2021, Sarmad Khoosat made a notable return to television after a three-year hiatus with the ARY Digital drama series Pardes. Directed by Marina Khan, the show featured Khoosat in the central role of Ahsan, the eldest son and sole breadwinner of a demanding family who moves abroad to financially support them, sacrificing his own well-being in the process. His performance as the loving husband of Zubaida played by Shaista Lodhi and devoted father was widely praised. Critics and audiences alike lauded his portrayal, with one review noting his character's death was a particularly moving moment, while another described his performance as "exceptionally well" and a testament to his craft. For his performance in the series, Khoosat received a nomination for the Best TV Actor - Critics' Choice award at the 21st Lux Style Awards.

In 2022, he produced and directed the critically acclaimed film Kamli, starring Saba Qamar, Sania Saeed, and Nimra Bucha. The film premiered at the International Film Festival Rotterdam 2023. It won several awards, including Best Director for Khoosat at the 22nd Lux Style Awards, the Minsk International Film Festival and the DC South Asian Film Festival. He also produced the film Joyland, which became the first Pakistani film to be selected for the Cannes Film Festival, where it won the Jury Prize in the Un Certain Regard section and the Queer Palm. Joyland was also selected as Pakistan's entry for the 95th Academy Awards, where it became the first Pakistani film to be shortlisted in the category of Best International Feature Film.

In 2025, Khoosat announced the release of his experimental short film, Dealing in Desire, which was premiered on his YouTube channel in August 2025.

He achieved a historic milestone in February 2026 with the premiere of his film Lali at the 76th Berlin International Film Festival, marking the first fully Pakistani-produced feature film to debut at the Berlinale. The film was screened in the prestigious Panorama section.

== Influence ==
Khoosat is influenced by Satyajit Ray and Ingmar Bergman in direction.

== Filmography ==
=== Television serials ===
| Year | Title | Network | Actor | Director | Writer |
|---|---|---|---|---|---|
| 2001 | Shashlik | PTV | Yes | Yes | Yes |
| 2002 | Do Aur Do Chaar | PTV Home | Yes | Yes | Yes |
| 2007 | Piya Naam Ka Diya | Geo TV | Yes | Yes | No |
| 2008 | Mujhe Apna Naam-o-Nishan Milay | Geo TV | No | Yes | No |
| 2008 | Qaatil | Aaj TV | No | Yes | No |
| 2010 | Kalmoohi | PTV Home | No | Yes | No |
| 2011 | Shashlik Xtra Hot | Geo TV | Yes | Yes | Yes |
| 2011 | Pani Jaisa Pyar | Hum TV | No | Yes | No |
| 2011 | Humsafar | Hum TV | Yes | Yes | No |
| 2012 | Ashk | Geo TV | No | Yes | No |
| 2012 | Shehr-e-Zaat | Hum TV | No | Yes | No |
| 2012 | Mera Yaqeen | Ary Digital | No | Yes | No |
| 2012 | Daagh | Ary Digital | No | Yes | No |
| 2013 | Dil Muhallay Ki Haveli | Geo Entertainment | Yes | No | No |
| 2016 | Mor Mahal | Geo TV | No | Yes | No |
| 2017 | Teri Raza | Ary Digital | Yes | No | No |
| 2017 | Baaghi | Urdu 1 | Yes | No | No |
| 2017 | Mujhay Jeenay Do | Urdu 1 | Yes | No | No |
| 2017 | Manto | Geo TV | Yes | Yes | No |
| 2018 | Noor ul Ain | Ary Digital | No | Yes | No |
| 2018 | Lamhay | A-Plus TV | Yes | No | No |
| 2018 | Aakhri Station | Ary Digital | Yes | Yes | No |
| 2021 | Pardes | Ary Digital | Yes | No | No |
| 2023 | Gunah | Express Entertainment | Yes | No | No |
| 2023 | Gumn | Green Entertainment | Yes | Yes | No |

=== Webseries ===
| Year | Title | Role | Network | Notes |
|---|---|---|---|---|
| 2020 | Ayesha | Fahad Ahmed | YouTube | |
| 2020 | Churails | Husband | Released on Zee5 | |
| 2022 | Baarwan Khiladi | Coach Ikhtiyar Ali | Released on Tapmad and Express TV | |

=== Telefilms ===
| Year | Film | Director | Actor | Writer | Notes |
|---|---|---|---|---|---|
| 2013 | Aina | Yes | No | Yes | Remake of Aina, a 1977 classic |
| 2015 | Dhokay Baaz | No | Yes | No | |
| 2016 | Ek Thi Marium | Yes | No | No | Based on the life of female fighter pilot Marium Mukhtiar |
| 2024 | Roshan Raahein | Yes | Yes | No | |
| 2025 | Badru Chacha Ka Makan | Yes | No | No | Eid-al-Fitr special |

=== Films ===
| Year | Film | Director | Producer | Actor | Writer | Notes |
|---|---|---|---|---|---|---|
| 2015 | Manto | Yes | No | Yes | No | Played the titular role of Manto |
| 2018 | Motorcycle Girl | No | No | Yes | No | |
| 2019 | Zindagi Tamasha | Yes | No | Yes | Yes | |
| 2022 | Kamli | Yes | Yes | No | Yes | |
| 2022 | Joyland | No | Yes | No | No | |
| 2026 | Lali | Yes | No | No | Yes | |

== Awards and recognition ==
In recognition of his contributions to Pakistani cinema, television, and the arts, Sarmad Khoosat received Pride of Performance Award in 2017 by the President of Pakistan.

| Ribbon | Decoration | Country | Year |
|---|---|---|---|
| | Pride of Performance | Pakistan | 2017 |

| Year | Award | Category | Work | Result | Ref. |
|---|---|---|---|---|---|
| 2012 | Lux Style Awards | Best TV Director | Pani Jaisa Piyar | Won | |
| 2013 | Lux Style Awards | Best TV Director | Humsafar | Won | |
| 2016 | Lux Style Awards | Best Film Director | Manto | Nominated | |
| 2016 | Lux Style Awards | Best Film Actor | Manto | Nominated | |
| 2022 | Lux Style Awards | Best TV Actor (Critics' Choice) | Pardes | Nominated | |
| 2023 | Lux Style Awards | Best Film Director | Kamli | Won | |
| 2023 | Minsk International Film Festival | Best Director | Kamli | Won | |
| 2023 | DC South Asian Film Festival | Best Director | Kamli | Won | |
| 2026 | DC South Asian Film Festival | Best Director | Lali | Won | |

== See also ==
- List of Lollywood actors
