= Chaudhween Ka Chand =

Pakistani television series

- Urdu: چودھویں کا چاند
- Genre: Romance; Comedy
- Written by: Faiza Iftikhar
- Directed by: Haissam Hussain
- Starring: Sanam Baloch; Danish Taimoor
- Opening theme: "Tera Hi Pyar" by Sunidhi Chauhan
- Country of origin: Pakistan
- Original language: Urdu
- No. of episodes: 24

Production
- Production company: Moomal Productions

Original release
- Network: Hum TV
- Release: 1 September – 2 October 2008

Chaudhween Ka Chand (transl. Full moon) is a Pakistani Ramadan special romantic comedy television series, written by Faiza Iftikhar, and directed by Haissam Hussain. It aired on Hum TV on weekdays from September 1 to October 2, 2008. It stars Sanam Baloch and Danish Taimoor as a newlywed couple, who navigate their relationship just after their marriage in the holy month of Ramadan.

Chaudhween Ka Chand was the earliest Ramadan special serial, and pioneered their trends.

== Cast ==
- Sanam Baloch as Rija
- Danish Taimoor as Taimoor
- Shakeel as Taimoor's grandfather
- Ismat Zaidi as Rija's mother
- Agha Shairaz as Azeem, Rija's brother-in-law
- Anita Fatima Camphor as Nazli, Shaina's friend
- Saife Hassan as the cehft at Rija and Taimoor's house
- Kanwar Arsalan as Kanwar, Taimoor's friend
- Eshita Syed as Sonia, Rija's friend
- Mani as Shakeel, Taimoor's friend and Sonia's husband
- Farah Shah as Sister Sara, Rija and Taimoor's neighbour
- Qavi Khan as Baray Daada, close friend of Taimoor's grandfather
- Salma Zafar as Rija's phuppo
- Naeema Garaj as Saima, a thief
- Noman Habib as Nomi, Sonia's brother
- Sabahat Ali Bukhari as Shaina, Taimoor's mother
- Arjumand Rahim as Sheera Khan, a famous actress and guest at Taimoor and Rija's house

== Production ==
Novelist and digest writer Faiza Iftikhar's writings for the monthly journals including Khwateen Digest caught the attention of director and actress Samina Ahmad and she met her to Sultana Siddiqui, the president of Hum TV; the meeting led her to write the Ramadan-based romantic-comedy Chaudhween Ka Chand. In between, Iftikhar began another screenplay but Chaudhween Ka Chand completed its production earlier and broadcast earlier, marking her debut serial as a screenwriterfor.

== Reception ==
The series was a commercial success; becoming a breakthrough for Baloch, and led Iftikhar to receive more demands of romantic-comedy genre.

=== Legacy ===
Chaudhween Ka Chand was one of its kind and the earliest Ramadan special series on Pakistani television, pioneering their trends. Due to the commercial success of the series, Ifitkhar received demands for romantic comedies leading her to write Mannchalay and Tujh Pe Quurban.
