= Sithara =

Sithara is an alternative to Sitara which in Hindi means "a star". The following are notable people and works with name:

- Sithara (singer), Indian singer
- Sithara (actress), Indian actress
- Sitara Devi kathak dancer
- Mohan Sithara, Malayalam film music composer
- Sitaara, a 1984 Telugu film
- Sithara, the Hindi TV series Sasural Simar Ka dubbed into Malayalam

== See also ==
- Sitara (disambiguation)
