= Satara =

Satara may refer to:

== Places ==
- Satara (city), Maharashtra, India
- Satara district, Maharashtra, India
- Satara Lok Sabha constituency
- Satara Assembly constituency
- Satara railway station
- Satara State, a former princely state of British India
- Satara, rest camp in the Kruger National Park

== People ==
- Satara Murray (born 1993), American association footballer

== Other uses ==
- Satara (moth), a genus of moths in the family Erebidae
