= Shehr e Tabassum =

- Urdu: شہر تبسم
- Directed by: Arafat Mazhar
- Production company: Puffball Studios
- Release date: February 29, 2020
- Running time: 9 min
- Country: Pakistan
- Language: Urdu

Shehr e Tabassum (Urdu: شہر تبسم, romanized: Śahr-i-Tabassum, lit. 'City of Smiles'), officially translated as City of Smiles, is a 2020 Pakistani Urdu-language animated short film directed by Arafat Mazhar and produced by Puffball Studios. It features an animated depiction of Pakistan set in a dystopian future of 2071, where crime and violent disagreements have been minimized by using technology to force everyone to constantly smile and not show negative emotions under threat of death.

The first trailer for Shehr e Tabassum was released in February 2019, and the final version was uploaded to YouTube on February 29, 2020. The film's creators have noted that other works—including science fiction films like Blade Runner and Akira, and such novels as George Orwell's Nineteen Eighty-Four—were the primary inspirations for the setting in the film.

== Development and production ==
The original concept for the film was obtained by the director, Arafat Mazhar, from a psychologist, Ayesha Iftikhar, who acted as co-founder with Mazhar for Shehri Pakistan, an organization whose focus has been on improving literacy and education among the children of Pakistan. Mazhar took this initiating concept for the film and spent several years forming the setting and city that would be presented in this version of Pakistan, naming the city and film Shehr e Tabassum. This included creating the design for the security robots and the civilian outfits, along with the general color palette for different scenes, which were all given to the creative director, Isma Gul Hassan. The idea of being the first to produce an animated cyberpunk film by an Urdu development team inspired several animators and designers to join the design team. The film uses a 2D animation style that is referred to by Mazhar as “Cyber-Khilafat aesthetic” and expresses his goals of using audio-visual mediums to depict societal and legal concepts and their impacts, with Shehr e Tabassum focusing on "freedom of expression, privacy, [and] surveillance in the digital age".

The film was first publicly showcased on February 2, 2020, at the Lahore Music Meet, but director Mazhar explained to the audience that he was not going to submit the film to any international film festivals, as they have a non-release clause that would prevent widespread dissemination of the film for free. Other pre-release screenings were done the same week in the United Kingdom. Following the screenings, the film was released online later that month.

== Setting and plot ==
The film is set in the city of Shehr e Tabassum, Pakistan in the year 2071 with an extreme surveillance state in place that observes and monitors the facial expressions of all citizens. A prior law had been passed in the country in order to prevent the social strife and conflict that came about from a civil war several decades earlier and the law required that all citizens smile at all times, which is measured by a head worn device. The device is referred to as a Hassmukh (lit. 'MerryFace') and fits around the head and throat, with the wide brimmed clothing reminiscent of someone being choked. The protagonist observes different aspects of the city, including flying rickshaws, large signboards lit by neon images that features parodic references to real stores in Pakistan, and frequent advertisements and references to a pill called "Smileton" that helps to make people constantly happy. Workers are also shown being physically reprimanded by the floating eye robots if they stop smiling while moving boxes. Numerous background conversations can be heard, with many of the citizens using the phrase ‘sab theek ho jayega’ (everything will be okay) when describing hardships and injustices in their lives.

== Critical reception ==
In an article for The News International, Haiya Bokhari praised the film, stating "bold and subversive, the film critiques not only our current political and social environment but links policing and censorship to a surveillance framework that curbs emotions, quite literally." Bokhari also noted the strong support from audiences for the female protagonist and the non-conformity attitude that was presented by her. Newlines Magazine's Anmol Irfan acknowledged the original nature of the film in Urdu animation, but focused more on what it meant for Pakistani media "as an artform" and suggested that a main reason for the success and popularity of the film is due to how it is "sparking conversations about the nature of present-day society" in the country. Writing for Dawn, Yusra Habib stated that the short film was "wholesome" and did manage to emotionally resonate, especially with the incident involving the mother and her not smiling child, but also pointed out that it was lacking in some ways, such as presenting a world that was much more advanced than what we'd see today, and that it "left a little to be desired" in the parts of the setting that were incomplete. Turyal Azam Khan in Asia Times commented on how most prior animation work in Pakistan had been thought of as only aimed at children and that Shehr e Tabassum has been a recent component in changing that viewpoint. Also, that the story's futuristic subject matter, but still being set in Pakistan, made it a "one-of-a-kind project" in modern animation.
