= Hanzala Shahid =

Pakistani actor

- حنظلہ شاہد
- Born: Attock, Punjab, Pakistan
- Occupation: Actor
- Years active: 2010

Hanzala is a Pakistani child actor who has appeared in 164 drama serials and Lollywood films.

He was a voice actor in 3 Bahadur and 3 Bahadur: The Revenge of Baba Balaam.
