= ARY Films =

Pakistani film company

- Industry: Film distribution, Film production
- Founded: 2007; 19 years ago
- Headquarters: Karachi, Sindh, Pakistan
- Products: Film
- Owner: Salman Iqbal; Jerjees Seja
- Parent: ARY Digital Network

ARY Films (Urdu: اے آر وائی فلمز) is a film distribution and production company in Pakistan, part of ARY Digital Network. 35 films including 11 Urdu, six Punjabi and 17 Pashto films have been released by ARY Films since 2013. Among them, Waar, Jawani Phir Nahi Ani, Wrong No., Jalaibee, 3 Bahadur and Punjab Nahi Jaungi have topped the charts in the industry.

== Films ==
List of films distributed/produced under the banner ARY Films

Release date	Title	Notes	Ref.
14 October 2007	Godfather	Distribution	
10 August 2013	Josh: Independence Through Unity		
23 August 2013	Main Hoon Shahid Afridi		
20 September 2013	Seedlings		
30 September 2013	Zinda Bhaag	Co-distribution with Footprint Entertainment	
16 October 2013	Waar		
13 June 2014	Tamanna		
29 July 2014	Sultanat		
20 March 2015	Jalaibee		
22 May 2015	3 Bahadur	Co-production with SOC Films	
18 July 2015	Wrong No.		
13 August 2015	Shah		
25 September 2015	Jawani Phir Nahi Ani	Co-production with Six Sigma Plus	
27 November 2015	John		
1 January 2016	Ho Mann Jahaan		
25 March 2016	Isteqamat	Co-production with Six Sigma Plus	
12 August 2016	Toilet - Where Love Begins	Co-produced with Shiny Toy Gun Films	
13 September 2016	Janaan		
28 October 2016	Team		
11 November 2016	Lahore Se Aagey	Co-production with Showcase Films	
25 November 2016	Dobara Phir Se	Production & distribution	
15 December 2016	3 Bahadur: The Revenge of Baba Balaam	Post-production	
13 January 2017	Kasam Sey		
2 September 2017	Punjab Nahi Jaungi	Distribution and co-production	
21 December 2017	Arth 2	Distribution	
21 December 2017	Rangreza	Distribution	
5 January 2018	Parchi	Co-production with IRK Films and Atif Lakhani Films	
14 June 2018	Azaadi	Distribution	
22 August 2018	Jawani Phir Nahi Ani 2	Co-production with Sig Sigma Plus and Salman Iqbal Films	
14 December 2018	3 Bahadur: Rise of the Warriors		
23 March 2019	Sherdil	Distribution	
9 June 2019	Slayer Returns		
August 2019	Parey Hut Love	Distribution	
10 July 2022	London Nahi Jaunga	Distribution and co-production	
28 October 2022	Tich Button		
TBA	Kamli	Distribution	
25 November 2022	Zarrar	Distribution	
6 June 2025	Love Guru	Distribution	
21 March 2026	Aag Lagay Basti Mein	Distribution and co-production with Big Bang Films	
27 May 2026	Luv Di Saun	Distribution	

== Joint ventures ==
An MoU was signed between ARY Films and Riaz Shahid Films on 23 November 2013, starting a joint production venture between the two companies announcing two films at the event, Arth 2 and Mission-5.

ARY Films is making a sequel of Waar, to be shot in Pakistan, U.K., Russia, Turkey and Yugoslavia.

On 7 December 2013, ARY Films & MindWorks Media joined hands to produce Pakistani movies. The collaboration started with Waar 2 and Delta Echo Foxtrot, later named Yalghaar.

On 11 September 2014, ARY Films and SOC Films announced a joint venture company named Waadi Animations, in intention to produce animated content including feature films, with the debut project 3 Bahadur.

== See also ==
- ARY Film Awards
- List of film distributors in Pakistan
