= Kundian =

Town in Punjab, Pakistan

Coordinates: 32°27′0″N 71°28′0″E

Kundian كندياں Mohalla Mominpura
- City and union council
- Interactive map of Kundian
- Country: Pakistan
- Region: Punjab
- District: Mianwali District
- Tehsil: Piplan

Population (2017 Pakistani census)
  - Total: 45,768
- Time zone: UTC+5 (PST)
- Postal code: 42050

Kundian (Urdu: كندياں), is the 2nd largest city of District Mianwali, tehsil Piplan in the Punjab province of Pakistan. Kundian is divided into Kundian Katcha & Pacca units. Kundian Junction railway station started operation in August 1887.

Kundian faces cold winds from Tajikistan and Afghanistan region being in line with river Kurram.

== History ==
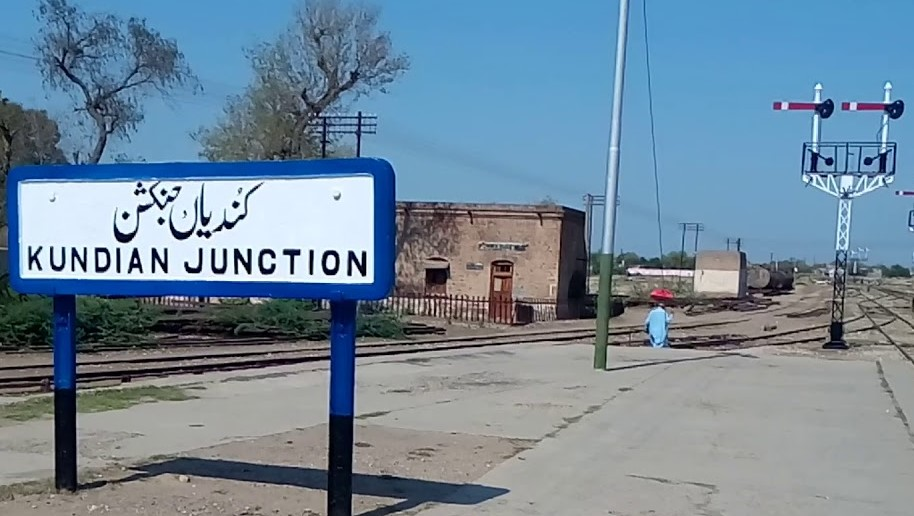
Pakistan Railways' Kundian Railways Station

The first settlement record of Kundian is from 1878. Old Kundian was situated, starting from Himmat Shah to Seelwan Chitta School in West of Current Kundian, Aliwali.

This town remained famous during the British regime and was considered a railway hub in North Western State Railway (NWR). Being in line with Sakesar top hills of Salt range, Kundian became a railway Junction. The old benches of Northwestern Railway can still be seen at Kundian Railway Junction. Railway Locomotive Shed is the 3rd largest locomotive shed of Pakistan Railways. This town remained on the transport priority map during Sher Shah Suri regime. The British government set up civil Rest House to manage local administrative affairs. Kundian Junction railway station is also a railway centre for locals of Katcha areas and Billott Sharif too.

There is a big Pakistan State Oil's oil depot in Kundian. Kundian remained a military pathway from hereby to Kundal, Darra Tang and Afghanistan.

Khanqah Sirajia is a very famous religious place in the south of Kundian.

Chashma Barrage and Chashma Hydroelectric Project are also located in Kundian. Kundian Nuclear Fuel Complex (KNFC) is also in the close vicinity.

=== Railway History of Kundian Junction ===
According to various versions British Indian railway reports like report of 1892. Sind Sagar Railway branch of main line from Lala Mulsa to Malkwal was extended from Malakwal to Bhakkar. So Kundian Railway station was formed on the way from Khushab Jn to Bhakkar. Before this a railway track was laid from Darya Khan to kalur kot to aid Military operations of Dera Ismail Khan and DG Khan. Military boat service linked this track. So Sindh Sagar railway was linked with this track. Also Kundian to attock track was constructed for military purposes.

Kundian Junction started functioning from 15 August 1887 when goods train service became operational from Malakwal to Bhakkar via Khushab Jn. Then Kundian to Daud Khel - Maari section was opened from 15 march 1892.

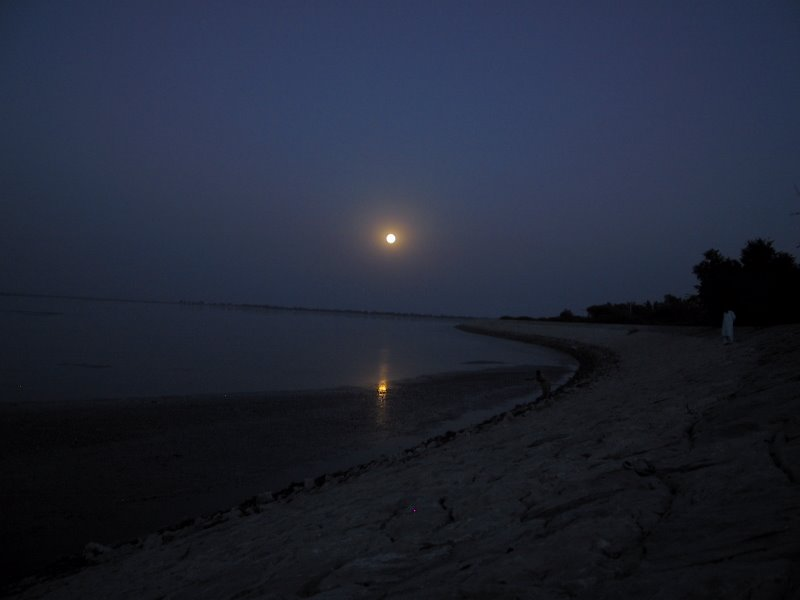
Kundian City has different castes and tribes, They represent the different areas of Kundian related to their caste. Mohalla Noor Kheil, Mohalla Yakhooran Wala, Mohalla Kalyaran Wala, Mohalla Sumbalan Wala, Mohalla Watooun Wala, Mohalla Keetan Wala, Mohalla Hussain Kheilan Wala, Mohalla Budhay Kheilan Wala

== Attractions ==
The Chashma Barrage is a notable attraction of Kundian, numerous people and families go there to swim and have fun, besides Kundian has many cultural attractions such as the Big Baazar in the heart of Kundian, Kundian is divided into several districts or Mohallas, for example, Mohalla Mominpura, which is the main and the most important district of Kundian. Kalyaran Wala Mohalla, Wattonwan Wala Mohalla are other examples. Besides that, Kundian has many pizza shops, restaurants, and marts. It also has renowned parks and farms for sightseeing, however, none of these beat the tourist attraction which is the Chashma Lake.
