= Behroze Sabzwari =

Pakistani actor

- بہروز سبزواری
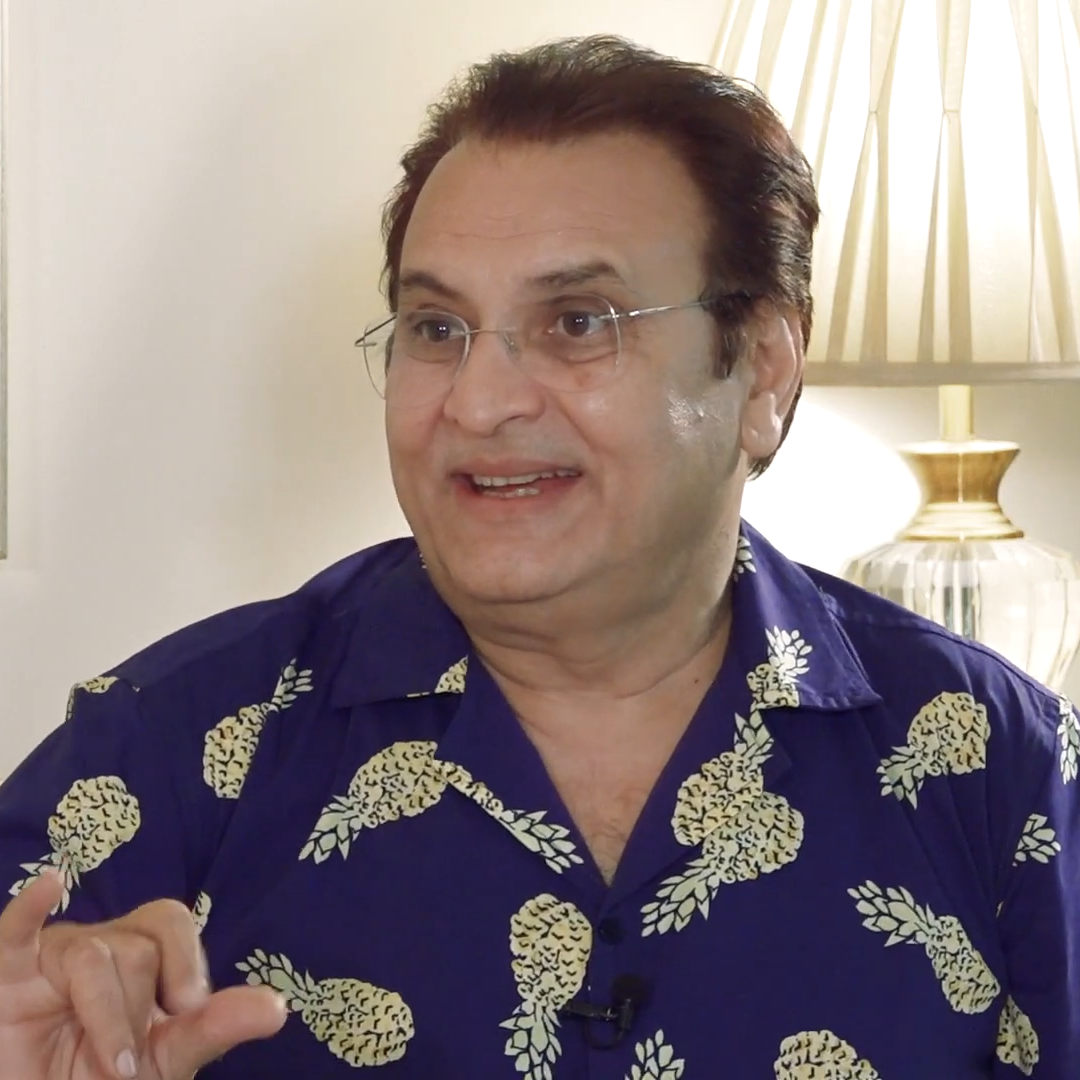
- Sabzwari in 2023
- Born: Behroze Sabzwari; 16 February 1955 (age 71)
- Occupations: Actor, Radio personality
- Years active: 1970s–present
- Notable work: Khuda Ki Basti (1974); Ankahi (1982); Tanhaiyaan (1985)
- Children: Shahroz Sabzwari
- Relatives: Javed Sheikh (brother-in-Law); Saleem Sheikh (brother-in-Law); Shahzad Sheikh (nephew); Momal Sheikh (niece)
- Honours: Pride of Performance (2009)

Behroze Sabzwari (Urdu: بہروز سبزواری) is a Pakistani actor who has appeared in films, television dramas and done voice-acting roles.

== Career ==
Behroze began his career at Radio Pakistan as a radio presenter. In the late 1970s, he started his acting career by starring in a "live" television children's play Dadajan Nanajan. Behroze has appeared in a number of television commercials. He has also done many stage plays, including the famous Khawaja Moinuddin play Mirza Ghalib Bandar Road Par. This was the earliest of Behroze's plays and introduced him to the TV viewers throughout Pakistan in the early seventies. However, he achieved fame through the PTV play Khuda Ki Basti in 1974 where he played the role of Nausha.

Behroze Sabzwari received the Pride of Performance on 23 March 2009, for his services to the Pakistani television industry for more than 40 years.

== Personal life ==
During the PTV serial era, he became known for his portrayal of the character Qabacha in the drama series Tanhaiyaan, with Bollywood actor Raj Kapoor also having acknowledged him.

When someone like Raj Kapoor messages you from India, saying: 'Qabacha when you are in Bombay, you will stay with me,' you know you are popular and loved.

— Behroz Sabzwari

== Television plays ==
Year	Title	Role	Channel	Notes	Ref
1969	Khuda Ki Basti	Nosha	PTV Home	PTV Classical Hit	
1969	Mera Naam Hai Mangoo		PTV Home	Classical Drama	
1982	Ankahi	Moby	PTV Home	Classical Drama, Written by Haseena Moin	
1985	Tanhaiyaan	Qutbutdin	PTV Home	Classical Drama, Written by Haseena Moin	
1998	Uljhan		PTV Home	Super Hit	
2001	Wafa Kay Mausam		PTV Home	Super Hit, Written by Naheed Sultana Akhtar and Directed by Sultana Siddiqui	
2002	Pyar Agar Kabhi Phir Hua		PTV Home	(PTV long Play)	
2008	Yeh Zindagi Hai	Laddan	Geo TV		
2010	Daam	Haji Saab			
2011	Anokha Ladla				
2011	Humsafar	Baseerat Hussain	Hum TV	Super Hit	
2012	Meray Dard Ko Jo Zuban Miley	Ahmed Ali			
2012	Tanhaiyan Naye Silsilay	Qabacha			
2012	Roshan Sitara	Ashfaq			
2013	Zindagi Gulzar Hai	Abrar	Hum TV	Memorable	
2013	Aise Jalay Jiya		Hum TV		
2013	Kankar		Hum TV		
2014	Susraal Mera				
2015	Gul-e-Rana	Abdul Aziz	Hum TV		
2015	Mera Naam Yousuf Hai	Waji Ahmed			
2015	Karb	Fahad	Hum TV		
2015	Diyar-e-Dil	Tajamal	Hum TV		
2016	Socha Na Tha		ARY Zindagi		
2016	Be Aitbaar	Asif	Hum TV		
2017	Commander Safeguard's Mission: Clean Sweep	Ghunsunna "Ghunnay"			
2017	Tumhare Hain		ARY Digital		
2017	Zard Zamano Ka Sawera		ARY Digital		
2017	Baby				
2017	Tau Dil Ka Kia Hua		Hum TV		
2018	Bay Dardi		ARY Digital		
2018	Naulakha				
2019	Dil-e-Bereham		A-Plus TV		
2019	Khaas		Hum TV		
2019	Barfi Laddu		ARY Digital		
2019	Thora Sa Haq	Waqar	ARY Digital		
2019	Azaab-e-Zindagi †	Hanzal			
2020	Bheegi Palkain				
2020	Bhabi Nazar Laga Dengi	Zulfiqar	ARY Digital		
2020	Meray Dost Meray Yaar Season 2	Zain's father	Geo Entertainment	Mini series	
2021	Hona Tha Pyar	Sharaafat Ali	Hum TV		
2022	Chauraha	Saleem (Junaid's father)	Geo TV		
2022	Mushkil		Geo TV		
2023	Ziddi	Usman	Aan TV		
2025	Ek Jhooti Kahani		Hum TV		

== Filmography ==
Year	Film	Role	Notes	Refs
1985	Halchal			
1985	Palkon ki Chhaon mein			
1995	Mushkil			
1996	Chief Sahib			
1999	Aik Aur Love Story			
2008	Khulay Aasman Ke Neechay			
2015	3 Bahadur	Voice of Deenu		
2016	Lahore Se Aagey	M. Mughal		
2016	3 Bahadur: The Revenge of Baba Balaam	Voice of Deenu		
2017	Chalay Thay Saath			
2018	3 Bahadur: Rise of the Warriors	Voice of Deenu		
2022	Lafangey			
2025	Neelofar	Fakhru		
