= Nimra Bucha =

Pakistani actress

- نِمرہ بُچّہ
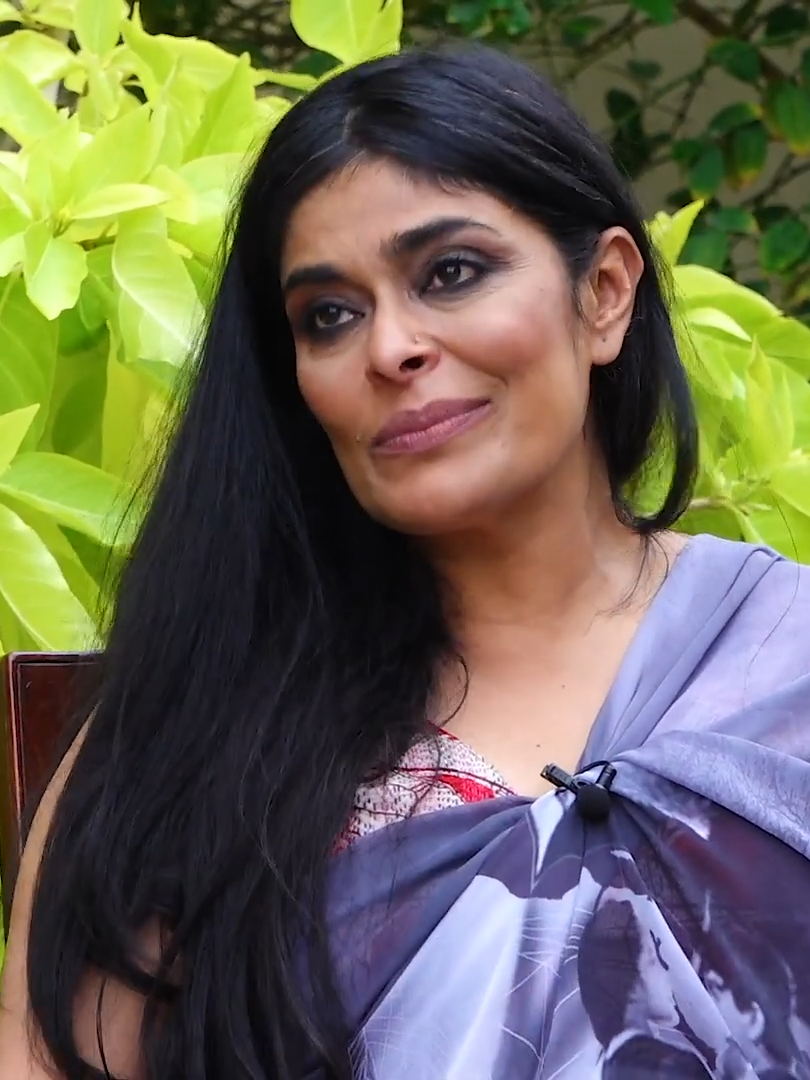
- Bucha in 2022
- Born: Karachi, Sindh, Pakistan
- Occupation: Actress
- Spouse: Mohammed Hanif
- Relatives: Sana Bucha (sister)

Nimra Bucha (Urdu: نِمرہ بُچّہ) is a Pakistani actress who has worked in TV serials, films, web-series and theatre. She played the role of Saadat Hassan Manto's muse in Sarmad Khoosat's Manto which earned her a nomination for Lux Style Awards for best supporting actress film.

== Career ==
She started her career at Traverse Theatre in 2006. She has since acted in several television dramas on different channels. Her famous work includes TV dramas Daam and Mera Yaqeen.

== Filmography ==
=== Films ===
Year	Film	Role	Notes
2011	Ghar Aur Ghata	Aisha	Television film
2015	Manto	Manto's muse	
2016	Ho Mann Jahaan	Shahida	
2016	Azad (2016 film)		
2016	Gardaab		
2018	3 Bahadur: Rise of the Warriors	Babushka	Voice only
2018	Altered Skin	Amina	
—	Senti Aur Mental		unreleased
2022	Kamli	Zeenat	
2023	Polite Society	Raheela Shah	
2023	The Queen of My Dreams	Mariam	

=== Television ===
Year	Title	Role	Network	Notes	Ref
2010	Daam	Aasma	ARY Digital	Acting debut	
2010	Parsa	Soni	Hum TV		
2010	Mastana Mahi	Pooja	Hum TV		
2011	Ek Nazar Meri Taraf	Safiya	Geo Entertainment		
2012	Mera Yaqeen	Nazish	ARY Digital		
2012	Baandi	Maya	ARY Digital	Lead role	
2013	Sabz Pari Laal Kabootar	Sakina	Geo Entertainment	Lead role	
2018	Aakhri Station	Shabana	ARY Digital	Lead role	
2022	Ms. Marvel	Najma	Disney+	American TV series	
2023	Murder is Easy	Mrs Humbleby	BBC One	Two-part drama	

=== Webseries ===
Year	Title	Role	Notes
2020	Churails	Batool Jan	ZEE5

== Accolades ==
Year	Nominee / Work	Award	Result	Ref
2016	Best supporting actress / Manto	Lux Style Award	Nominated	

== Personal life ==
Bucha is married to the British-Pakistani writer and journalist Mohammed Hanif.
