= Sharmeen Obaid-Chinoy =

Pakistani filmmaker and journalist (born 1978)

Hilal-e-Imtiaz Sharmeen Obaid-Chinoy
- شرمین عبید چنائے
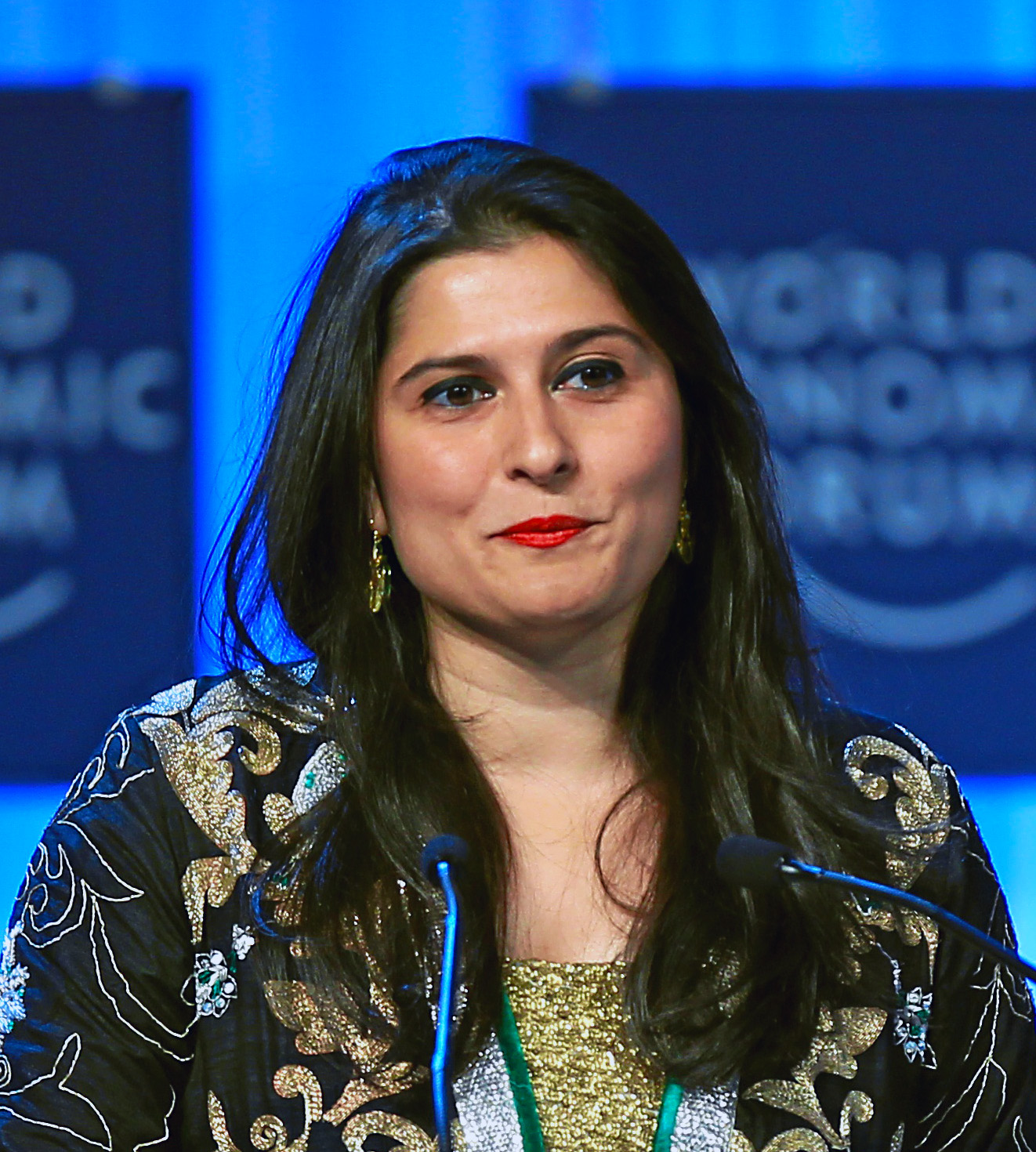
- Chinoy at the World Economic Forum in 2013
- Born: November 12, 1978 (age 48); Karachi, Sindh, Pakistan
- Citizenship: Canadian, Pakistani
- Education: Smith College (BA); Stanford University (MA, MIP)
- Occupations: Filmmaker, journalist
- Years active: 2000–present
- Spouse: Fahd Kamal Chinoy
- Children: 2
- Honours: Hilal-e-Imtiaz
- Website: Official website

Sharmeen Obaid-Chinoy (Urdu: شرمین عبید چنائے; born November 12, 1978) is a Pakistani-Canadian journalist, filmmaker and political activist known for her work in films that highlight gender inequality against women. She is the recipient of seven Emmy Awards and two Academy Awards.

== Early life and education ==
Obaid-Chinoy was born on 12 November 1978 in Karachi, Pakistan. She is a Gujarati Muslim. Her mother Saba Obaid is a social worker, and her father Sheikh Obaid was a businessman. She has four younger sisters, including Mahjabeen Obaid, and a younger brother. Obaid-Chinoy attended Convent of Jesus and Mary, followed by schooling at Karachi Grammar School, where she was a class-fellow of Kumail Nanjiani. According to her, she was not inclined toward academics but received good grades. She asked many questions about the world, so her mother suggested that she put her questions in writing. Obaid-Chinoy wrote to a local English-language newspaper, and by the age of 17 was doing investigative reporting for it.

Obaid-Chinoy moved to the United States to attend Smith College, where she completed her bachelor's degree in Economics and Government in 2002. Later, she received two master's degrees from Stanford University in Communication and International Policy Studies. Following her education, she moved to Toronto with her husband Fahd Chinoy, and as of 2015 divided her time between Karachi and Toronto. She became a Canadian citizen in 2004.

== Career ==
In 2002, Obaid-Chinoy returned to Pakistan, and launched her career as a filmmaker with her first film Terror's Children for The New York Times. In 2003 and 2004 she made two award-winning films while a graduate student at Stanford University. She then began a long association with the PBS TV series Frontline World, where she reported "On a Razor's Edge" in 2004 and went on over the next 5 years to produce many broadcast reports, online videos and written "Dispatches" from Pakistan. Her most notable films include Children of the Taliban, The Lost Generation, Afghanistan Unveiled, 3 Bahadur, Song of Lahore and the Academy Award-winning Saving Face and A Girl in the River: The Price of Forgiveness. Her visual contributions have earned her numerous awards, including the Academy Award for Best Short Subject Documentary (2012 and 2016) and the Emmy Award in the same category (2010 and 2011) and the One World Media Award for Broadcast Journalist of the Year (2007). Her films have been aired on several international channels, including the PBS, CNN, Discovery Channel, Al Jazeera English and Channel 4.

Obaid-Chinoy has won seven Emmy Awards, including two in the International Emmy Award for Current Affairs Documentary category for the films Pakistan's Taliban Generation and Saving Face. Her Academy Award win for Saving Face made her the first Pakistani to win an Academy Award, and one of only 11 female directors to ever win an Oscar for a non-fiction film. She is also the first non-American to win the Livingston Award for Young Journalists.

In 2007, Obaid-Chinoy helped found the Citizens Archive of Pakistan, whose projects center around the preservation of Pakistan's cultural and social heritage. She also serves as the Ambassador for Blood Safety for Pakistan's national blood safety program. Obaid-Chinoy is a TED Fellow. Time magazine named her in its annual list of the 100 most influential people in the world for 2012.

On 23 March 2012, Pakistan's president conferred the second highest civilian award, the Hilal-e-Imtiaz, on Obaid-Chinoy for bringing honour to Pakistan as a filmmaker. The same year Time magazine named her one of the 100 most influential people in the world. She was ranked 37th on Desiclub.com's list of the 50 Coolest Desis of 2009. In 2012, Obaid-Chinoy released the 5-part series Ho Yaqeen (To Believe). In 2014, SOC Films and Obaid-Chinoy released Aghaz-e-Safar, a 12-episode series for Aaj News which tackled issues affecting ordinary Pakistanis across the country including child abuse, domestic violence, issues of gun violence, water scarcity, land grabbing etc. She holds the records for being the first female film director to have won two Academy Awards by the age of 37 and the first person of Pakistani origin to be nominated for (and to win) the Academy Award for best documentary in the short subject category, and the first person of Pakistani origin to win any Academy Award.

In 2014, SOC Films released the 6-part series I Heart Karachi. On 19 April 2015, Song of Lahore, directed and produced by her and Andy Schocken, premiered at Tribeca Film Festival and was the Runner-Up to the Tribeca Audience Choice Award. In September 2015, Broad Green Pictures acquired the U.S. distribution rights to Song of Lahore announcing the release of the film in select cinemas in the U.S. In October 2015 the film was submitted for consideration in the documentary feature category for the 2016 Oscars by the Academy of Motion Picture Arts and Sciences. Song of Lahore European premiere was at the International Documentary Film Festival Amsterdam (IDFA) from 18 to 29 November 2015. The film had its Middle Eastern premiere at the 12th Annual Dubai International Film Festival in December 2015.

On 22 May 2015, Pakistan's first animated movie, 3 Bahadur, directed by Obaid-Chinoy, a film dedicated to inculcating bravery in the youth of Pakistan, was released by Waadi Animations. It was the first computer-animated feature-length film made by a Pakistani. Despite being shown on only 50 screens in Pakistan, the film became Pakistan's highest grossing animated movie of all time, earning Rs 6.5 million and exceeding the record set by Rio 2. 3 Bahadur also screened at the Montreal World Film Festival in Canada, in August 2015.

On 11 September 2015, Journey of a Thousand Miles: Peacekeepers Obaid-Chinoy's feature documentary, co-directed and produced with Geeta Gandbhir, screened at the Toronto International Film Festival 2015 for its North American premiere. The film follows the journey of three Bangladeshi women soldiers who are deployed to Haiti as part of the United Nations peacekeeping mission. The film premiered at the Mumbai Film Festival on 29 October 2015 for its Asian premiere and played at the DOC NYC Festival in November 2015.

On 15 February 2016, Obaid-Chinoy met with the Prime Minister of Pakistan, Nawaz Sharif in Islamabad to discuss the measures required to plug legal loopholes which allow the perpetrators of the so-called honour killings to walk free. On 22 February 2016, the first screening of A Girl in the River: The Price of Forgiveness was held at the Prime Minister's Secretariat in Islamabad, opened by remarks made by Obaid-Chinoy and Prime Minister Sharif - concerning the amendments needed to prevent honour killings from occurring in Pakistan. On 17 February 2016, the film screened at the United Nations Headquarters in New York City as part of a discussion of women and peacekeeping. The documentary won the Humanitarian Award at the RiverRun International Film Festival on 21 April 2016 and also won at the Bentonville Film Festival, dated 7 May 2016. On 28 February 2016, A Girl in the River: The Price of Forgiveness won Obaid-Chinoy a second Oscar for Best Documentary, Short Subject at the 88th Academy Awards. This is the first Oscar win for her film company SOC Films and her second Oscar as director. Later in 2017, the work also received an International Emmy Award for Best Documentary.

"This week the Pakistani prime minister has said that he will change the law on honour killing after watching this film. That is the power of film."

— Obaid-Chinoy while accepting her Oscar for A Girl in the River: The Price of Forgiveness

On 20 May 2016 Song of Lahore was released in select cinemas across New York City and Los Angeles.

Obaid-Chinoy's commercial venture Sulagta Sitara is a documentary series which was released on ARY Digital in 2016. In January 2017, she was invited to speak at the 47th World Economic Forum (WEF), and was the first artist to co-chair the WEF's annual meeting. Obaid-Chinoy said: "It is a great honour to be the first artist ever to be given the opportunity to co-chair the prestigious World Economic Forum at Davos in 2017. I have always believed that the true mark of any thriving society is the amount of investment made in its cultural and artistic infrastructure. There is, now, an increasing recognition of the fact that business and economics must go hand-in-hand with culture and arts for society to move forward and it is with great pride that I will be representing both the art community and my country, Pakistan!"

From 1–9 July 2017 a new work by Obaid-Chinoy - HOME1947 - was inaugurated at the Manchester International Festival. The exhibition then travelled to Mumbai in August, where it formed part of the Museum of Memories at the Godrej India Culture Lab. The Pakistan premiere of Home 1947 took place in October 2017 at the Heritage Now festival in Lahore, before transferring to Karachi in December 2017.

Obaid-Chinoy's series of documentary films, Look But With Love, released on the Within app in October 2017, is Pakistan's first virtual reality documentary series focusing on the people of Pakistan who are striving to change the socio-political landscape of their communities through causes they are passionate about.

In November 2017, Obaid-Chinoy was awarded the 2017 Knight International Journalism Award, by the International Center for Journalists (ICFJ) in Washington, DC. The award recognises her efforts to chronicle the human toll of extremism. "At great personal risk, Obaid-Chinoy and al Masri faced terrorism head on, getting behind the scenes to chronicle untold abuses", said ICFJ President Joyce Barnathan. The award by the ICFJ recognises media professionals who demonstrate a passionate commitment to excellent reporting that makes a difference in the lives of people around the world. Obaid-Chinoys' work in highlighting legal loopholes around the practice of honour killing led to legislative change in Pakistan.

In 2018, the Aagahi series was launched which educates women about the rights and how to navigate the police and judicial system. Aagahi has won wide acclaim with women sharing the videos and commenting on their usefulness.

In 2018, Obaid-Chinoy spoke at TED in Vancouver about the impact of mobile cinema which has been traveling across Pakistan screening films for small towns and communities in all provinces.

In June 2018, it was announced that the HBO Sports documentary Student Athlete, directed by Obaid-Chinoy and Trish Dalton, would be debuting on 2 October 2018 on the HBO network.

In September 2019, Obaid-Chinoy unveiled her animated film, Sitara: Let Girls Dream, in theaters in New York. It was produced under the banner of Obaid-Chinoy's animation company, Waadi Animations entirely in Pakistan, in association with Vice Studios and Gucci's Chime For Change.

Her animated mini-series Stories for Children about inspiring figures in Pakistan looks at local heroes' relationships with their parents. Obaid-Chinoy is the honorary consul general for Norway in Karachi, Pakistan.

It was announced in September 2020 that Obaid-Chinoy would be co-directing the Ms. Marvel series with Adil El Arbi, Bilall Fallah and Meera Menon for Disney+ to bring Marvel Studios’ first Muslim hero to the big screen. The opportunity made her the first Pakistani director to be involved with Marvel.

Following its tour in Pakistan, the Home 1947 showcase made its North American debut at Oklahoma Contemporary in February 2022. Within this exhibition, Obaid-Chinoy contributed two films that delve into the profound impact of the Partition of India in 1947. Obaid-Chinoy's earlier film, Terror’s Children (2002), focused on Afghan refugee children in Karachi.

In September 2022, Patakha Pictures, founded by Obaid-Chinoy, launched "Pakistan Stories" in collaboration with the Scottish Documentary Institute and the British Council. The initiative supported ten female Pakistani documentary filmmakers, pairing them to produce five short films over 12 weeks, celebrating 75 years of Pakistan through the female gaze.

In October 2022, it was reported that Obaid-Chinoy would be directing an untitled film set in the Star Wars universe, written by Steven Knight, from a previous draft by Damon Lindelof and Justin Britt-Gibson. In April 2023, Disney officially announced during the Star Wars Celebration convention that Obaid-Chinoy would direct the film, set 15 years after the events of The Rise of Skywalker, and with Daisy Ridley back as Rey. It was originally scheduled for a December 17, 2027, but in May 2025, it was removed from the release schedule, with Avengers: Doomsday taking its place. In February 2023 Obaid-Chinoy introduced an international art residency program "Neela Asmaan" through SOC Films. The program provides opportunities for both emerging and established artists from Pakistan and beyond to work in the picturesque Shigar Valley of Gilgit-Baltistan.

It was announced in April 2023 that Obaid-Chinoy is set to direct a new documentary about the life of fashion designer Diane von Fürstenberg. The documentary, co-directed with Trish Dalton called Diane von Fürstenberg: Woman in Charge has been released on Hulu. It features interviews with her family, Hillary Clinton, Oprah Winfrey, Barry Diller, Anderson Cooper, Mark Jacobs, archival footage, as well as telling her mother's story as a Holocaust survivor.

== Works ==
†	Denotes productions that have not yet been released

=== Non-fiction ===
Year	Film	Director	Producer	Notes
2002	Terror's Children	Yes	Yes	
2003	Reinventing the Taliban?	Yes	Yes	
2004, 2009	Frontline/World	No	Yes	Segments: "Pakistan: On a Razor's Edge", "Children of the Taliban", "Pakistan: Letter from Karachi"
2005	Women of the Holy Kingdom	Yes	Yes	
2005	Pakistan's Double Game	Yes	No	
2006	Highway of Tears	Yes	No	
2006	City of Guilt	No	Yes	
2006	Cold Comfort	Yes	Yes	
2006	The New Apartheid	Yes	No	
2006	Assimilation No, Integration Yes	Yes	No	
2007	Birth of a Nation	Yes	No	
2007, 2009	Dispatches	No	Yes	Episodes: "Afghanistan Unveiled", "Pakistan's Taliban Generation"
2008	Iraq: The Lost Generation	No	Yes	
2010	True Stories	Yes	Yes	Episode: "Transgender: Pakistan's Open Secret"
2010	Sold: Fighting the New Global Slave Trade	No	Yes	
2012	Saving Face	Yes	Yes	
2013	Ho Yaqeen	Yes	Yes	6 episodes, director: episode "Humera Bachal"
2014	Seeds of Change	Yes	Yes	
2014	Aghaz-e-safar	Yes	No	12 episodes
2015	Song of Lahore	Yes	Yes	
2015	A Journey of a Thousand Miles: Peacekeepers	Yes	Yes	
2015	A Girl in the River: The Price of Forgiveness	Yes	Yes	
2016	Woman with Gloria Steinem	No	Yes	Episode: "Pakistan: On the Frontlines"
2017	Ladies First	No	Yes	
2017	Look But With Love	Yes	Yes	virtual reality documentary series, 5 episodes
2018	Aagahi	No	Yes	14 animated shorts
2018	DOC World	No	Yes	Episode: "Armed with Faith"
2018	Stories for children	No	Yes	animated shorts, 4 episodes
2018	Climate Change	Yes	No	animated shorts, 5 episodes
2018	Student Athlete	Yes	Yes	
2019	Freedom Fighters	Yes	Yes	
2020	Fundamental. Gender. Justice. No Exceptions.	Yes	Yes	5 episodes
2021	A Life Too Short	No	Yes	

=== Fiction ===
Year	Film	Director	Writer	Producer	Notes
2015	3 Bahadur	Yes	Yes	Yes	
2016	3 Bahadur: The Revenge of Baba Balaam	Yes	Yes	Yes	
2018	3 Bahadur: Rise of the Warriors	Yes	Yes	Yes	
2020	Sitara: Let Girls Dream	Yes	Yes	Yes	Short film
2022	Ms. Marvel	Yes	No	No	2 episodes

=== Other works ===
Year	Work	Notes
2017	HOME1947	"Immersive exhibition"

== Awards and nominations ==
Year	Award	Category	Work	Result	Notes
2007	One World Media	Broadcast Journalist of the Year Award	General work	Won	
2010	International Emmy Award	Best Documentary	Pakistan's Taliban Generation	Won	
2010	Livingston Award	Young Journalists - Best International Reporting	General work	Won	
2012	Academy Award	Best Documentary Short Film	Saving Face	Won	
2012	New York Indian Film Festival	Best Documentary	Saving Face	Won	
2012	SAARC Film Awards	Best Documentary Prize	Saving Face	Won	
2012	Glamour Awards	The Lifesaver	Saving Face	Won	
2012	Hilal-i-Imtiaz	Contribution to arts	General work	Honorary	
2012	Time 100		General work	Listed	
2013	Crystal Award	Outstanding efforts in Promoting Human Rights and Women's Issues through Film	General work	Won	
2013	International Emmy Award	Best Documentary	Saving Face	Won	
2013	International Emmy Award	Outstanding Editing: Documentary and Long Form	Saving Face	Won	
2013	International Emmy Award	Outstanding Science and Technology Programming	Saving Face	Nominated	
2013	International Emmy Award	Outstanding Cinematography Documentary and Long Form	Saving Face	Nominated	
2013	International Emmy Award	Outstanding Research	Saving Face	Nominated	
2013	Queen Elizabeth II Diamond Jubilee Medal (Canadian version)		General work	Honorary	
2014	Asia Game Changer Award	For eye-opening films that give voice to the voiceless	General work	Won	
2014	BBC's 100 women	Women in War	General work	Listed	
2015	Time 100		General work	Listed	
2016	Academy Award	Best Documentary Short Subject	A Girl in the River: The Price of Forgiveness	Won	
2017	International Emmy Award	Best Documentary	A Girl in the River: The Price of Forgiveness	Won	
2017	Knight International Journalism Award		General work	Won	
2017	Robert F. Kennedy Journalism Award	Television-International	A Girl in the River: The Price of Forgiveness	Won	
2018	Smith College Honorary Degree	Documentary journalism in advancing human rights	General work	Honorary	
2018	Eliasson Global Leadership Prize	World-class Storytelling Skills	General work	Won	
2025	The Cinema for Peace Dove for Women’s Empowerment		Diane von Furstenberg: Woman in Charge	Won	

== Other achievements ==
- Trustee at Smith College
- Board member of the Asian University for Women
- First artist to co-chair the World Economic Forum in 2017

== See also ==
- List of Pakistani journalists
