= Zuhab Khan =

Pakistani actor

- زوہاب خان
- Born: May 4, 2001 (age 25); Karachi, Sindh, Pakistan
- Occupation: Actor
- Years active: 2005 – present
- Spouse: Wania Nadeem (m. 2024)
- Parent(s): Mr.M Saleem Khan & Mrs.M Ambreen Saleem Khan
- Website: www.zuhabkhanofficial.com

Zuhab Khan (Urdu: زوہاب خان; born in Karachi, 4 May 2001) is a Pakistani actor who started acting by doing commercials and moved on to acting in serials.

== Career ==
He starred in the drama Omar Dadi aur Gharwalay, Mein Mummy aur Woh, Kash Mai Teri Beti Na Hoti, Perfume Chowk and Na Kaho Tum Mere Nahi.

He also worked as a voice artist in the animated movie 3 Bahadur: The Revenge of Baba Balaam and also started his rap career. Zuhab's first rap song is (My Story).

== Personal life ==
Khan dated Tiktoker and influencer Wania Nadeem. In May 2024, the couple got married.

== Television ==
- Omar Dadi aur Gharwalay
- Main Mummy aur Woh
- Kash Mai Teri Beti Na Hoti
- Madiha Maliha
- Yeh Zindagi Hai
- Saans
- Qissa Chaar Darvesh
- Bulbulay
- Dugdugi
- Ek Hath Ki Tali
- Honeymoon
- Maana Ka Gharana
- Shaadi Ka Laddoo
- Mann Ke Moti
- Haal-e-Dil
- Na Kaho Tum Mere Nahi
- Perfume Chowk
- Malika-e-Aliya
- Malika-e-Aliya 2
- Kitni Girhain Baqi Hain
- Tishnagi Dil Ki
- Daldal
- Bholi Bano
- Dilli Waale Dularay Babbu
- Ghar Jamai (2018–present)
- Ghisi Piti Mohabbat
- Pinjra

== Filmography ==
- 3 Bahadur (2015)
- Abdullah: The Final Witness (2016)
- 3 Bahadur: The Revenge of Baba Balaam (2016)
- Examstic (TBA)
