= Sitara: Let Girls Dream =

2020 short film

- Film poster
- Directed by: Sharmeen Obaid-Chinoy
- Written by: Sharmeen Obaid-Chinoy
- Produced by: Gloria Steinem
- Music by: Laura Karpman
- Production companies: Netflix Animation; Waadi Animations
- Distributed by: Netflix
- Release date: 8 March 2020
- Running time: 15 minutes
- Country: Pakistan
- Language: English

Sitara: Let Girls Dream (Urdu: ستارہ: لڑکیوں کو خواب دیکھنے دو) is a 2020 Pakistani animated short film directed and written by Sharmeen Obaid-Chinoy. The film attempts to spotlight the issue of child marriage.

== Plot ==
In the 1970s, in the old city of Lahore, lives Pari, a fourteen-year-old girl who dreams of becoming a pilot. She treasures her book about trailblazer Amelia Earhart and flies pretend planes with her younger sister Mehr, unaware of the building tension between her parents. The reason for the tension soon becomes clear: Pari is being forced to marry a much older man. Her fate after the marriage ceremony is only hinted at, but Mehr joins her mother in her accusatory attitude towards her father, and even her brother brushes off the father's attempts at male camaraderie with him. The film is silent, but at its close, a written message appears: "Around the world every year, the dreams of 12 million child brides will never take flight". As the credits roll, a series of still illustrations tell another story of hope: The father has learned his lesson and sends Mehr to school. She graduates and becomes a pilot, flying away in a plane and wearing an outfit just like Amelia Earhart's.

== Production ==
The film was produced by Obaid-Chinoy's production company, Waadi Animations. The team faced multiple challenges to create a high-level animation film in Pakistan, where there is little film education and thus few animation professionals, a dearth of equipment and software of the types and quality needed, and faulty infrastructure. According to Obaid-Chinoy:

“Our machines are old. You are beholden to the machines that you use. You are beholden to power cuts that take place for hours on end. You are beholden to machines that often break down... We would often put things on render and come back in the morning and they wouldn’t have rendered.”

The team began their work in 2012, sometimes watching YouTube tutorials, sometimes having the benefit of Pixar contants assisting over Skype. By 2019, they had a film ready for release, and Sitara became the first Pakistani animated film to be released and distributed by Netflix USA.

== Release ==
Gucci hosted a special screening for the film at 2020 Sundance Film Festival in connection to their campaign #LetGirlsDream. It was released on 8 March 2020 on Netflix on the occasion of International Women's Day.

== Awards ==
The film won three awards at the 2019 Los Angeles Animation Festival, for Best Produced Screenplay, Best Music Score and the Humanitarian Award.
