= Allahyar and the Legend of Markhor =

- Theatrical release poster
- Directed by: Uzair Zaheer Khan
- Written by: Uzair Zaheer Khan
- Produced by: Usman Iqbal
- Starring: Anum Zaidi; Natasha Humera Ejaz; Ali Noor; Azfar Jafri; Abdul Nabi Jamali; Arieb Azhar; Hareem Farooq; Ali Rehman Khan; Arshad Mehmood; Amjad Chaudary; Ahmed Ali
- Cinematography: Arooj Azam
- Edited by: Muhammad Azeem
- Music by: Ahmed Ali
- Production company: 3rd World Studios
- Distributed by: ARY Films
- Release date: 2 February 2018 (Pakistan)
- Running time: 90 minutes
- Country: Pakistan
- Language: Urdu

Allahyar and the Legend of Markhor (Urdu: اللہ یار اور مارخور کی کہانی) is a Pakistani animated fantasy adventure film directed by Uzair Zaheer Khan. It depicts the story of a young boy and his relationship with animals. The film is produced by 3rd World Studios and distributed by ARY Films. The movie aims to shed light on the preservation and illegal hunting of wildlife, with main characters Mehru (a markhor), Hero (a Chukar partridge, known as chakor in Pakistan), and a snow leopard named Chak'ku being endangered species.

The film received a largely positive reaction by the general audience but received mixed to positive reviews by critics.

== Premise ==
Set in the northern regions of Pakistan, the story follows Allahyar, a young and mischievous boy who ends up dealing with circumstances he never thought possible.

== Cast ==
- Anum Zaidi as Allahyar
- Natasha Humera Ejaz as Mehru
- Ali Noor as Mani
- Azfar Jafri as Hero
- Abdul Nabi Jamali as Chak'ku
- Arieb Azhar as Bablu
- Hareem Farooq
- Ali Rehman Khan
- Nadia Jamil
- Arshad Mehmood as Master Jee
- Amjad Chaudary
- Ahmed Ali

== Production ==
The movie was produced by 3rd World Studios, for which the studio was awarded a dev grant by Epic Games. It is the first movie produced entirely in Unreal Engine. The first song of the movie, a rendition of Zohaib Hassan's 1982 song "Muskuraye Ja", song by Natasha Humera Ejaz and produced by Ahmed Ali, was officially released on 13 January 2018.

The film was directed by Uzair Zaheer Khan, a Pakistani film director, screenwriter, and computer graphics artist. He was the director and writer of the 2018 film Allahyar and the Legend of Markhor, and its 2023 sequel Allahyar and the 100 Flowers of God.

== Reception ==
The film received attention by the media even soon after the initial teasers and trailers. It was admired for its theme on the awareness about wildlife conservation as well as being a movie featuring a child protagonist, which is not common in Pakistan.

Maleeha Mengal from Dunya News noted that the movie would "remain one of the most memorable stories for children for many years". It was also well received because producing animated movies is harder and costly.

== Accolades ==
The film won the prestigious Monolith Award for Content at the Infinity Film Festival at Hollywood. It was also screened at South Asian International Film Festival (SAIFF) at New York, where it received Best Feature Film in the Audience Choice category.

== Sequel ==
A sequel titled, Allahyar and the 100 Flowers of God was released in 2023 with returning director, Uzair Zaheer Khan.

3rd Worlds Studios returned to produce and provide animation for the film.

The film featured Anum Zaidi, and Azfar Jafri reprising their roles from the previous film with Ali Zafar, Iqra Aziz, Humayun Saeed, Bushra Ansari, and Meera Ji joining the cast as new characters.

== See also ==
- List of Pakistani animated films
