= List of highest-grossing Pakistani films =

This list charts the most successful Pakistani films screened at cinemas in Pakistan and overseas. Pakistani films generate income from several revenue streams including box office sales (admissions), theatrical exhibitions, television broadcast rights and merchandising. See List of highest-grossing films in Pakistan for domestic gross figures.

== Global gross figures ==
With a worldwide box-office gross of more than Rs. 4 billion, The Legend of Maula Jatt is the highest-grossing Pakistani film of all time.

The following list shows Pakistan's top 30 highest-grossing films, which include films from all the Pakistani languages. These figures are not adjusted for ticket prices inflation.

This is a dynamic list and may never be able to satisfy particular standards for completeness. You can help by adding missing items with reliable sources

† Background shading indicates films playing in the week commencing 19 November 2026 in theaters around the world.

Rank	Peak	Title	Worldwide gross in PKR (USD)	Year	Language	Director	Production company	Ref.
1	1	The Legend of Maula Jatt	Rs. 4.0 billion (US$14 million)	2022	Punjabi	Bilal Lashari	Encyclomedia / Lashari Films / Geo Films	
2	2	Aag Lagay Basti Mein	Rs. 1.01 billion (US$3.6 million)	2026	Urdu	Bilal Atif Khan	Big Bang Films; Salman Iqbal Films	
3	2	Love Guru	Rs. 820 million (US$2.9 million)	2025	Urdu	Nadeem Baig	ARY Films Salman Iqbal Films Six Sigma Plus	
3	1	Jawani Phir Nahi Ani 2	Rs. 730 million (US$2.5 million)	2018	Urdu	Nadeem Baig	ARY Films Salman Iqbal Films Six Sigma Plus	
5	2	London Nahi Jaunga	Rs. 550 million (US$2.0 million)	2022	Urdu; Punjabi	Nadeem Baig	Six Sigma Plus	
6	1	Punjab Nahi Jaungi	Rs. 516.5 million (US$1.8 million)	2017	Urdu; Punjabi	Nadeem Baig	Six Sigma Plus; Salman Iqbal Films; ARY Films	
7	3	Teefa in Trouble	Rs. 500 million (US$1.8 million)	2018	Urdu; Punjabi	Ahsan Rahim	Lightingale Productions; Geo Films	
8	1	Jawani Phir Nahi Ani	Rs. 494.4 million (US$1.8 million)	2015	Urdu	Nadeem Baig	Six Sigma Plus; ARY Films	
9	5	Parwaaz Hai Junoon	Rs. 432 million (US$1.5 million)	2018	Urdu	Haseeb Hassan	Momina & Duraid Films; Hum Films	
10	7	Quaid-e-Azam Zindabad	Rs. 420.5 million (US$1.5 million)	2022	Urdu	Nabeel Qureshi	Filmwala Pictures	
11	11	The Donkey King	Rs. 402 million (US$1.4 million)	2018	Urdu	Aziz Jindani	Talisman Studios; Geo Films	
12	2	Bin Roye	Rs. 400.5 million (US$1.4 million)	2015	Urdu	Shahzad Kashmiri	MD Films; Hum Films	
13	11	Money Back Guarantee	Rs. 366.7 million (US$1.3 million)	2023	Urdu	Faisal Qureshi	Zashko Films Game Over Productions	
14	1	Waar	Rs. 346.5 million (US$1.2 million)	2013	Urdu; English	Bilal Lashari	MindWorks Media; ARY Films	
15	3	Wrong No.	Rs. 302.5 million (US$1.1 million)	2015	Urdu	Yasir Nawaz	YNH Films; ARY Films	
16	12	Superstar	Rs. 300.5 million (US$1.1 million)	2019	Urdu	Mohammed Ehteshamuddin	Momina & Duraid Films; Hum Films	
17	5	Actor in Law	Rs. 300 million (US$1.1 million)	2016	Urdu	Nabeel Qureshi	Filmwala Pictures	
18	6	Janaan	Rs. 300 million (US$1.1 million)	2016	Urdu; Pashto	Azfar Jafri	IRK Films; ARY Films	
19	10	Parey Hut Love	Rs. 300 million (US$1.1 million)	2019	Urdu	Asim Raza	The Vision Factory Films ARY Films	
20	5	Ho Mann Jahaan	Rs. 225 million (US$800,000)	2016	Urdu	Asim Raza	The Vision Factory Films ARY Films	
21	12	Wrong No. 2	Rs. 216.5 million (US$770,000)	2019	Urdu	Yasir Nawaz	YNH Films; Geo Films	
22	8	Lahore Se Aagey	Rs. 216 million (US$770,000)	2016	Urdu	Wajahat Rauf	AN Entertainment Pvt. Ltd. Showcase Films; ARY Films	
23	22	Deemak	Rs. 210 million (US$750,000)	2025	Urdu	Rafay Rashdi	Geo Films; Mandviwalla Entertainment	
24	10	Na Maloom Afraad 2	Rs. 210 million (US$750,000)	2017	Urdu	Nabeel Qureshi	Filmwala Pictures; Excellency Films	
25	9	Yalghaar	Rs. 200 million (US$720,000)	2017	Urdu; English	Hassan Rana	MindWorks Media	
26	1	Choorian	Rs. 200 million (US$720,000)	1998	Punjabi	Syed Noor	Pak Nishan Films	
27	18	Chhalawa	Rs. 189 million (US$680,000)	2019	Urdu	Wajahat Rauf	Showcase Films; Hum Films	
28	27	Neelofar	Rs. 180 million (US$640,000)	2025	Urdu	Ammar Rasool	Hum Films	
29	25	Umro Ayyar - A New Beginning	Rs. 180 million (US$640,000)	2024	Urdu	Azfar Jafri	VR Chili Production Mandviwalla Entertainment	
30	20	Ghabrana Nahi Hai	Rs. 166.5 million (US$600,000)	2022	Urdu	Saqib Khan	Mastermind Productions JB Films Geo Films	

== Domestic gross figures ==
This is the list of top 11 highest-grossing Pakistani films within local Pakistani cinemas, which include films from all the Pakistani languages (business by foreign films in Pakistan is not included). These figures are not adjusted for ticket prices inflation.

† Background shading indicates films playing in the week commencing 19 November 2026 in Pakistani theaters.

Rank	Film	Total gross	Language	Year	Reference(s)
1	The Legend of Maula Jatt	Rs. 115.02 crore (US$4.1 million)	Punjabi	2022	
2	Jawani Phir Nahi Ani 2	Rs. 53.00 crore (US$1.9 million)	Urdu	2018	
3	Love Guru	Rs. 44.00 crore (US$1.5 million)	Urdu	2025	
4	Teefa in Trouble	Rs. 36.00 crore (US$1.3 million)	Urdu; Punjabi	2018	
5	Punjab Nahi Jaungi	Rs. 35.85 crore (US$1.3 million)	Urdu; Punjabi	2017	
6	Parwaaz Hai Junoon	Rs. 35.00 crore (US$1.3 million)	Urdu	2018	
7	Jawani Phir Nahi Ani	Rs. 34.00 crore (US$1.2 million)	Urdu	2015	
8	London Nahi Jaunga	Rs. 30.00 crore (US$1.1 million)	Urdu	2022	
9	Aag Lagay Basti Mein	Rs. 26.00 crore (US$930,000)	Urdu	2026	
10	The Donkey King	Rs. 24.50 crore (US$880,000)	Urdu	2018	
11	Actor in Law	Rs. 24.00 crore (US$860,000)	Urdu	2016	
12	Waar	Rs. 23.00 crore (US$820,000)	Urdu; English	2013	
13	Na Maloom Afraad 2	Rs. 21.00 crore (US$750,000)	Urdu	2017	

== Highest-grossing opening weekends ==
The following list shows Pakistan's top 11 highest-grossing opening weekends worldwide, which include films from all the Pakistani languages. For opening weekends gross in Pakistan, see List of highest-grossing opening weekends in Pakistan

These figures are not adjusted for ticket prices inflation.

Rank	Film	Total gross	Weekend days	Year	Reference(s)
1	The Legend of Maula Jatt	Rs. 51.00 crore (US$1.8 million)	3	2022	
2	Jawani Phir Nahi Ani 2	Rs. 25.02 crore (US$890,000)	5	2018	
3	Parwaaz Hai Junoon	Rs. 15.68 crore (US$560,000)	5	2018	
4	Punjab Nahi Jaungi	Rs. 15.00 crore (US$540,000)	3	2017	
5	Parey Hut Love	Rs. 12.15 crore (US$430,000)	3	2019	
6	Superstar	Rs. 11.40 crore (US$410,000)	3	2019	
7	Chhalawa	Rs. 10.80 crore (US$390,000)	5	2019	
8	Wrong No. 2	Rs. 10.60 crore (US$380,000)	5	2019	
9	Jawani Phir Nahi Ani	Rs. 10.33 crore (US$370,000)	3	2015	
10	Teefa in Trouble	Rs. 10.15 crore (US$360,000)	3	2018	
11	Load Wedding	Rs. 7.30 crore (US$260,000)	5	2018	

== Highest-grossing films by language ==
=== Urdu ===
Rank	Title	Worldwide gross in PKR (USD)	Year	Director	Production company	Reference(s)
1	Love Guru	Rs. 801 million (US$2.8 million)	2025	Nadeem Baig	ARY Films Salman Iqbal Films Six Sigma Plus	
2	Jawani Phir Nahi Ani 2	Rs. 730 million (US$2.6 million)	2018	Nadeem Baig	ARY Films Salman Iqbal Films Six Sigma Plus	
3	London Nahi Jaunga	Rs. 550 million (US$2.0 million)	2022	Nadeem Baig	Six Sigma Plus	
4	Punjab Nahi Jaungi	Rs. 516.5 million (US$1.8 million)	2017	Nadeem Baig	Six Sigma Plus; Salman Iqbal Films; ARY Films	
5	Teefa in Trouble	Rs. 500 million (US$1.8 million)	2018	Ahsan Rahim	Lightingale Productions; Geo Films	
6	Jawani Phir Nahi Ani	Rs. 494.4 million (US$1.8 million)	2015	Nadeem Baig	Six Sigma Plus; ARY Films	
7	Parwaaz Hai Junoon	Rs. 432 million (US$1.5 million)	2018	Haseeb Hassan	Momina & Duraid Films; Hum Films	
8	Quaid-e-Azam Zindabad	Rs. 420.5 million (US$1.5 million)	2022	Nabeel Qureshi	Filmwala Pictures	
9	Aag Lagay Basti Mein	Rs. 420 million (US$1.5 million)	2026	Bilal Atif Khan	Big Bang Films Salman Iqbal Films	
10	The Donkey King	Rs. 402 million (US$1.4 million)	2018	Aziz Jindani	Talisman Studios; Geo Films	
11	Bin Roye	Rs. 400.5 million (US$1.4 million)	2015	Shahzad Kashmiri	MD Films; Hum Films	
12	Money Back Guarantee	Rs. 366.7 million (US$1.3 million)	2023	Faisal Qureshi	Zashko Films Game Over Productions	

=== Punjabi ===
Rank	Title	Worldwide gross in PKR (USD)	Year	Director	Production company	Reference(s)
1	The Legend of Maula Jatt	Rs. 4.0 billion (US$14 million)	2022	Bilal Lashari	Encyclomedia / Lashari Films / Geo Films	
2	Choorian	Rs. 200 million (US$720,000)	1998	Syed Noor	Pak Nishan Films	

== Highest grossing films by year of release ==
This is the list of highest-grossing Pakistani films by year of release. These films are listed as per their worldwide gross figures at time of release. These figures are not adjusted for ticket prices inflation.

† Background shading indicates films playing in the week commencing 19 November 2026 in theaters around the world.

Year	Title	Worldwide gross	Language	Production company/director	Reference(s)
1975	Mera Naam Hai Mohabbat	Rs. 7 crore (US$7.1 million)	Urdu	Shabab Productions	(Note: In 1981, Mera Naam Hai Mohabbat sold nearly 60 million tickets in China. At an average ticket price of CN¥0.2, the film grossed an estimated CN¥12 million, equivalent to $7.1 million (Rs. 7 crore). Adjusted for inflation, this is equivalent to $25 million (Rs. 326 crore).)
1998	Choorian	Rs. 20.00 crore (US$720,000)	Punjabi	Pak Nishan Films	
2007	Khuda Kay Liye	Rs. 15.06 crore (US$540,000)	Urdu / English	Shoman Productions	
2011	Bol	Rs. 16.80 crore (US$600,000)	Urdu	Shoman Productions	
2013	Waar	Rs. 34.65 crore (US$1.2 million)	Urdu / English	MindWorks Media / Off Road Studios	
2014	Na Maloom Afraad	Rs. 14.00 crore (US$500,000)	Urdu	Filmwala Pictures	
2015	Jawani Phir Nahi Ani	Rs. 49.44 crore (US$1.8 million)	Urdu	Six Sigma Plus	
2016	Janaan	Rs. 30.00 crore (US$1.1 million)	Urdu / Pashto	Filmwala Pictures	
2017	Punjab Nahi Jaungi	Rs. 51.65 crore (US$1.8 million)	Urdu / Punjabi	Six Sigma Plus / Salman Iqbal Films	
2018	Jawani Phir Nahi Ani 2	Rs. 73.00 crore (US$2.6 million)	Urdu	Six Sigma Plus; Salman Iqbal Films; ARY Films	
2019	Superstar	Rs. 30.05 crore (US$1.1 million)	Urdu	Momina & Duraid Films; Hum Films	
2022	The Legend of Maula Jatt	Rs. 280.00 crore (US$10 million)	Punjabi	Encyclomedia / Lashari Films	
2025	Love Guru	Rs. 820 million (US$2.9 million)	Urdu	ARY Films Salman Iqbal Films Six Sigma Plus	

== Timeline of highest-grossing films ==
† Background shading indicates films playing in the week commencing 19 November 2026 in theaters around the world.

Year	Title	Record gross earning	Language	Reference(s)
1975	Mera Naam Hai Mohabbat	Rs. 7 crore (US$7.1 million)	Urdu	
1998	Choorian	Rs. 20.00 crore (US$720,000)	Punjabi	
2013	Waar	Rs. 34.65 crore (US$1.2 million)	Urdu; English	
2015	Jawani Phir Nahi Ani	Rs. 49.44 crore (US$1.8 million)	Urdu	
2017	Punjab Nahi Jaungi	Rs. 51.65 crore (US$1.8 million)	Urdu; Punjabi	
2018	Jawani Phir Nahi Ani 2	Rs. 73.00 crore (US$2.6 million)	Urdu	
2022	The Legend of Maula Jatt †	Rs. 280.00 crore (US$10 million)	Punjabi	

== Highest grossing franchises and film series ==
The Jawani Phir Nahi Ani franchise isPakistan's first film franchise to gross over ₨100 crore.

† Background shading indicates that at least one film in the series is playing in the week commencing 19 November 2026 in theaters around the world.

Highest-grossing franchises and film series^{[§]}(The films in each franchise can be viewed by selecting "show".)

Rank	Franchise / series	Total worldwide box office (crore)	No. of films	Average of films (crore)	Highest grossing film (crore)

1	Jawani Phir Nahi Ani	₨119.44	2	₨60	Jawani Phir Nahi Ani 2 (₨70.00)
1	Jawani Phir Nahi Ani 2 (2018)	₨70.00			
2	Jawani Phir Nahi Ani (2015)	₨49.44			

2	Punjab Nahi Jaungi (film series)	₨106.65	2	₨53	Punjab Nahi Jaungi (₨51.65)
1	Punjab Nahi Jaungi (2017)	₨51.65			
2	London Nahi Jaunga (2022)	₨55.00			

3	Wrong No. (film series)	₨51.9	2	₨26	Wrong No. (₨30.25)
1	Wrong No. (2015)	₨30.25			
2	Wrong No. 2 (2019)	₨21.65			

4	Na Maloom Afraad	₨35	2	₨18	Na Maloom Afraad 2 (₨21)
1	Na Maloom Afraad 2 (2017)	₨21.00			
2	Na Maloom Afraad (2014)	₨14.00			

5	Karachi Lahore	₨31.9	2	₨16	Lahore Se Aagey (₨21.60)
1	Lahore Se Aagey (2016)	₨21.60			
2	Karachi Se Lahore (2015)	₨10.30			

6	3 Bahadur	₨20.92	3	₨7	3 Bahadur: The Revenge of Baba Balaam (₨08.10)
1	3 Bahadur: The Revenge of Baba Balaam (2016)	₨08.10			
2	3 Bahadur (2015)	₨06.65			
3	3 Bahadur: Rise of the Warriors (2018)	₨06.17			

== See also ==
- List of highest-grossing films in Pakistan
- Lists of Pakistani films
- Cinema of Pakistan
- Lists of highest-grossing films
- List of 2022 box office number-one films in Pakistan
