= List of 2023 box office number-one films in Pakistan =

This is a list of films which ranked number one at the weekend box office for the year 2023 in Pakistan.

== Number-one films ==
†	This implies the highest-grossing movie of the year.

#	Weekend End Date	Film	Total weekend gross	Language	Notes	Reference(s)
1	1 January 2023	The Legend of Maula Jatt †	Rs. 2.02 crore (US$72,000)	Punjabi	Avatar: The Way of Water (#2)	
2	8 January 2023	The Legend of Maula Jatt †	Rs. 2.86 crore (US$100,000)	Punjabi	Avatar: The Way of Water (#2)	
3	15 January 2023	The Legend of Maula Jatt †	Rs. 0.89 crore (US$32,000)	Punjabi	Avatar: The Way of Water (#2)	
4	22 January 2023	The Legend of Maula Jatt †	Rs. 0.81 crore (US$29,000)	Punjabi		
5	29 January 2023	The Legend of Maula Jatt †	Rs. 0.85 crore (US$30,000)	Punjabi		
6	5 February 2023	The Legend of Maula Jatt †	Rs. 0.71 crore (US$25,000)	Punjabi		
7	12 February 2023	The Legend of Maula Jatt †	Rs. 0.60 crore (US$21,000)	Punjabi		
8	19 February 2023	Ant-Man and the Wasp: Quantumania	N/A	English	The Legend of Maula Jatt (#2)	
9	5 March 2023	What's Love Got to Do with It?	Rs. 0.21 crore (US$7,500)	English	Ant-Man and the Wasp: Quantumania	
10	23 April 2023	Money Back Guarantee	Rs. 5.85 crore (US$210,000)	Urdu	John Wick: Chapter 4, Huey Tum Ajnabi (#3)	
11	30 April 2023	John Wick: Chapter 4	Rs. 3.47 crore (US$120,814)	English		
12	7 May 2023	Guardians of the Galaxy Vol. 3	N/A	English	John Wick: Chapter 4 (#2, $54,018)	
13	14 May 2023	John Wick: Chapter 4	$23,425	English		
14	21 May 2023	Fast X †	Rs. 9.73 crore (US$340,204)	English	Guardians of the Galaxy Vol. 3(#2), John Wick: Chapter 4,Money Back Guarantee	
15	28 May 2023	Fast X †	Rs. 4.26 crore (US$149,240)	English	Guardians of the Galaxy Vol. 3, John Wick: Chapter 4	
16	4 June 2023	Fast X †	Rs. 2.27 crore (US$80,264)	English	54 screens. Spider-Man: Across the Spider-Verse (#2)	
17	11 June 2023	Fast X †	Rs. 1.17 crore (US$40,682)	English	Transformers: Rise of the Beasts, Spider-Man: Across the Spider-Verse	
18	18 June 2023	Fast X †	$19,842	English		
19	25 June 2023	Fast X †	$13,143	English		
20	2 July 2023	Fast X †	$10,733	English		
21	9 July 2023	Fast X †	$1,441	English		
22	16 July 2023	Mission: Impossible – Dead Reckoning Part One	Rs. 4.50 crore (US$155,000)	English		
23	23 July 2023	Oppenheimer	Rs. 5.75 crore (US$202,754)	English		
24	30 July 2023	Oppenheimer	Rs. 1.25 crore (US$43,619)	English		
25	6 August 2023	Oppenheimer	Rs. 1.68 crore (US$58,930)	English		
26	13 August 2023	Oppenheimer	$34,214	English		
27	20 August 2023	Oppenheimer	$14,373	English		
28	27 August 2023	Oppenheimer	$9,043	English		
29	3 September 2023	Oppenheimer	$4,177	English		
30	10 September 2023	Oppenheimer	$3,082	English		
31	17 September 2023	Oppenheimer	$2,078	English		
32	24 September 2023	Oppenheimer	$1,137	English		
33	1 October 2023	Oppenheimer	N/A	English		
34	8 October 2023	The Exorcist: Believer	$28,796	English		
35	15 October 2023	The Exorcist: Believer	$15,665	English		
36	22 October 2023	The Exorcist: Believer	$10,081	English		
37	29 October 2023	Five Nights at Freddy's	$17,576	English		
38	5 November 2023	Five Nights at Freddy's	$9,082	English		
39	12 November 2023	Saw X	$3,021	English		
40	19 November 2023	The Hunger Games: The Ballad of Songbirds & Snakes	$10,902	English		
41	26 November 2023	Trolls Band Together	$1,337	English		
42	10 December 2023	The Hunger Games: The Ballad of Songbirds & Snakes	$3,799	English		
43	17 December 2023	The Exorcist: Believer	$815	English		
44	24 December 2023	The Exorcist: Believer	$169	English		
45	31 December 2023	Migration	$5,549	English		

== Highest-grossing films ==
=== In-Year Release ===
Highest-grossing films of 2023 by In-year release in Pakistan
Rank	Film	Domestic gross	Country	Language	Ref.	Notes.
1	Fast X	Rs. 26.00 crore (US$909,856)	United States	English		as of 19 July 2023
3	Oppenheimer	Rs. 18.01 crore (US$609,426)	United States	English		as of 10 September 2023
2	John Wick: Chapter 4	Rs. 14.50 crore (US$501,369)	United States	English		as of 3 June 2023
4	Money Back Guarantee	Rs. 12.40 crore (US$440,000)	Pakistan	Urdu		as of 9 May 2023

== See also ==
- Lists of box office number-one films
- List of highest-grossing films in Pakistan
- List of highest-grossing Pakistani films
- Lists of highest-grossing films
- 2023 in Pakistan

Preceded by 2022	2023	Succeeded by 2024
