= List of Pakistani films of 2025 =

List of Pakistani films by year 2025

This is a list of notable Pakistani films that are scheduled to be released in 2025.

The top highest-grossing Pakistani films released in 2025, by worldwide box office gross revenue, are as follows.

Background color indicates the current releases

Highest-grossing films of 2025
| Rank | Title | Studio | Gross | Ref. |
|---|---|---|---|---|
| 1 | Love Guru | ARY Films; Six Sigma Productions; Salman Iqbal Films | Rs. 80 crore (US$2.9 million) (worldwide) | |
| 2 | Deemak | Geo Films; Mandviwalla Entertainment | Rs. 20.6 crore (US$740,000) (worldwide) | |
| 3 | Neelofar | Hum Films | Rs. 11.6 crore (US$410,000) (worldwide) | |

== List ==
| Opening | | Title | Director | Cast | Production company | Ref. |
|---|---|---|---|---|---|---|
| J A N | 16 | Indus Echoes (Sindhu Ji Goonj) | Rahul Aijaz | Ansaar Mahar; Samina Seher; Vajdaan Shah | Anthem Films; Big Meta Films; Film N' Chips Media Productions | |
| J A N | 24 | Baap (The First Love of a Daughter) | Nadeem Cheema | Moammar Rana; Sana Gull; Imran Ahmed; Asad Jatt; Bisma Altaf; Mohsin Ali; Nasir Sheikh | Nadeem Cheema Films | |
| M A R | 30 | The Martial Artist | Shaz Khan | Shaz Khan; Sanam Saeed; Faran Tahir; Thesa Loving; Babar Peerzada | Odysseus Entertainment | |
| M A R | 30 | Qulfi | Mashood Qadri | Babar Ali; Shahroz Sabzwari; Javed Sheikh; Moammar Rana; Saeeda Imtiaz | Mashood Qadri Films | |
| M A R | 30 | Kabir | Neha Laj | Adnan Shah Tipu; Anam Tanveer; Sakhawat Naz; Maysam Ali; Jahangir Jani | Maysam Ali Films | |
| M A R | 30 | Ishq-e-Lahore | Shahid Rana | Saima; Altamash Butt; Jawed Sheikh; Shamoon Abbasi; Qaiser Piya | Distribution Club | |
| M A R | 30 | Lambi Judai | Jawed Raza | Babar Ali; Hareem Fatima; Nawaz Khan; Fiza Mirza | Malik Productions | |
| J U N | 06 | Deemak | Rafay Rashidi | Samina Peerzada; Faysal Quraishi; Sonya Hussyn | Wah Wah Productions and Mandviwalla Entertainment | |
| J U N | 06 | Love Guru | Nadeem Baig | Humayun Saeed; Mahira Khan; Ahmad Ali Butt; Jawed Sheikh | Six Sigma Plus; Salman Iqbal Films | |
| A U G | 14 | Welcome to Punjab | Shahzad Rafique | Aadi Khan; Zara Hayat; Sajid Hasan; Bushra Ansari; Jawed Sheikh; Mumtaz | Safdar Malik Productions | |
| O C T | 15 | A Door to My Memory (Yaadon De Buhe) | Suhail Ahmed and Sheryar Ali | Saad Naseem; Aimen Zahra; Syed Tanveer Hussain; Farida Haddad; Shiraz Baig | Independent | |
| N O V | 21 | Jujji | Habib Shahzad | Muhammad Arslan; Mustafa Rizvi; Anjum Habibi | BHM Films | |
| N O V | 28 | Neelofar | Ammar Rasool | Fawad Khan; Mahira Khan; Madiha Imam; Behroze Sabzwari | Distribution Club | |
| D E C | 26 | Item | Huma Shaikh | Aliya Ali; Azad Khan; Behroze Sabzwari; Sangeeta; Aima Khan; Mariam Mirza | Huma Shaikh Films | |

== See also ==
- List of highest-grossing Pakistani films
- List of highest-grossing films in Pakistan
- List of Pakistani films
