= List of Pakistani films of 2022 =

List of Pakistani films by year 2022

This is a list of Pakistani films that are scheduled to be released in 2022. For foreign films of 2022 release in Pakistan, See List of 2022 box office number-one films in Pakistan.

== Box office collection ==
The top ten highest-grossing Pakistani films released in 2022, by worldwide box office gross revenue, are as follows.

Background color indicates the current releases

Highest-grossing films of 2022
Rank	Title	Studio	Gross	Ref.
1	The Legend of Maula Jatt	Lashari Films / Geo Films / AAA Motion Pictures / Mandiwala Entertainment	Rs. 401 crore (US$14 million)	
2	London Nahi Jaunga	ARY Films / Six Sigma Plus	Rs. 55.00 crore (US$2.0 million)	
3	Quaid-e-Azam Zindabad	Filmwala Pictures / Hum Films	Rs. 50.05 crore (US$1.8 million)	
4	Tich Button	ARY Films / Salman Iqbal Films / Shooting Star Studio	Rs. 38.70 crore (US$1.4 million)	
5	Zarrar	Jehan Films / Pinewood Studios	Rs. 12 crore (US$430,000)	
6	Ghabrana Nahi Hai	Mastermind Production / JB Films / Geo Films	Rs. 11.65 crore (US$420,000)	
7	Dum Mastam	Cereal Entertainment / Hum Films	Rs. 10.15 crore (US$360,000)	
8	Kamli	Khoosat Films	Rs. 6.00 crore (US$210,000)	
9	Parde Mein Rehne Do	Showcase Productions / Eveready Pictures / Geo Films	Rs. 5.30 crore (US$190,000)	
10	Chakkar	Farid Nawaz Productions	Rs. 3.20 crore (US$110,000)	

== January–March ==
Opening		Title	Director	Cast	Studio (production house)	Ref.
M A R	3	Ishrat Made in China	Mohib Mirza	Mohib Mirza; Sanam Saeed; Sara Loren; HSY	Ek Alif Films, Eleven Eleven Films	

== April–June ==
Opening		Title	Director	Cast	Studio (production house)	Ref.
M A Y	3	Tere Bajre Di Rakhi	Syed Noor	Saima Noor; Mustafa Qureshi; Iftikhar Thakur; Abdullah Khan; Jannat Mirza	Sadfar Malik Films	
M A Y	3	Parde Mein Rehne Do	Wajahat Rauf	Hania Aamir; Ali Rehman Khan; Jawed Sheikh	Showcase Productions	
M A Y	3	Dum Mastam	Mohammed Ehteshamuddin	Imran Ashraf; Amar Khan	Cereal Entertainment	
M A Y	3	Chakkar	Yasir Nawaz	Ahsan Khan; Yasir Nawaz; Jawed Sheikh; Neelam Muneer	Farid Nawaz Productions	
M A Y	3	Ghabrana Nahi Hai	Saqib Khan	Saba Qamar; Zahid Ahmed; Nayyar Ejaz	JB Films, Mastermind Productions	
J U N	3	Kamli	Sarmad Khoosat	Saba Qamar; Sania Saeed; Nimra Bucha	Khoosat Films	
J U N	3	Khel	Zill Atif	Sameel Atif; Dua Ali; Manahil Malik; Abdul Naafay	Riverview Films	
J U N	3	Thori Setting Thora Pyar	Fayyaz Adrees	Malik Adeel; Saeeda Imtiaz; Noman Habib	Eveready Pictures	
J U N	17	Peechay Tou Dekho	Syed Atif Ali	Yasir Hussain; Sarah Khan; Sarwan Ali Palijo	Screenshots Productions	
J U N	24	Rehbra	Amin Iqbal	Ahsan Khan; Ayesha Omar	SA Entertainment	
J U N	24	Chaudhry - The Martyr	Azeem Sajjad	Tariq Islam; Shamoon Abbasi; Zara Abid	Laaj Productions	

== July–September ==
Opening		Title	Director	Cast	(Studio) Production company	Ref.
J U L	10	London Nahi Jaunga	Nadeem Baig	Humayun Saeed; Mehwish Hayat; Sohail Ahmed; Kubra Khan	ARY Films	
J U L	10	Quaid-e-Azam Zindabad	Nabeel Qureshi	Fahad Mustafa; Javed Sheikh; Mahira Khan	Hum Films	
J U L	10	Lafangey	Abdul Khaaliq Khan	Sami Khan; Saleem Meraj; Mani	Al Wafiq studios	
A U G	19	Intezaar	Sakina Samo	Samina Ahmed; Khalid Ahmed; Kaif Ghaznavi	Sakina Samo Films	
S E P	2	Carma - The Movie	Kashan Admani	Adnan Siddiqui; Osama Tahir; Zhalay Sarhadi; Naveen Waqar	Dream Station Productions	
S E P	2	Doda	Adil Bizanjo	Shoaib Hassan; Abila Kurd; Fiza Akhtar	NosachFilms	

== October–December ==
Opening		Title	Director	Cast	Studio (production house)	Ref.
O C T	13	The Legend of Maula Jatt	Bilal Lashari	Fawad Khan; Hamza Ali Abbasi; Mahira Khan; Humaima Malick	Encyclomedia; Lashari Films	
N O V	18	Joyland	Saim Sadiq	Alina Khan; Ali Junejo; Sarwat Gilani; Rasti Farooq	Multiples	
N O V	25	Tich Button	Qasim Ali Mureed	Farhan Saeed; Iman Ali; Sonya Hussyn; Feroze Khan	ARY Films	
N O V	25	Zarrar	Shaan Shahid	Shaan Shahid; Kiran Malik; Nadeem Baig; Waseem Badami	Hum Films	
D E C	2	Yaara Vey	Manish Pawar	Sami Khan; Faizan Khawaja; Aleeze Nasser	Eveready Pictures	

== See also ==
- List of 2022 box office number-one films in Pakistan
- List of highest-grossing Pakistani films
- List of highest-grossing films in Pakistan
- Lists of Pakistani films
