= List of 2022 box office number-one films in Pakistan =

This is a list of films which ranked number one at the weekend box office for the year 2022 in Pakistan.

== Number-one films ==
The Legend of Maula Jatt became the highest-grossing film of 2022.

Date	Title	Studio	Gross	Ref
12 January 2022	The 355	Kinberg Genre Films, Freckle Films, FilmNation Entertainment, & Huayi Brothers	$3,152	
19 January 2022	The 355	Kinberg Genre Films, Freckle Films, FilmNation Entertainment, & Huayi Brothers	$1,378	
30 March 2022	Ambulance	New Republic Pictures, Endeavor Content, Project X Entertainment, & Bay Films	$95	
6 April 2022	Ambulance	New Republic Pictures, Endeavor Content, Project X Entertainment, & Bay Films	$95	
18 May 2022	The Bad Guys	DreamWorks Animation Studios	$2,909	
25 May 2022	The Bad Guys	DreamWorks Animation Studios	$693	
1 June 2022	The Bad Guys	DreamWorks Animation Studios	$626	
8 June 2022	The Bad Guys	DreamWorks Animation Studios	$315	
15 June 2022	Jurassic World Dominion	Universal Pictures, Amblin Entertainment, The Kennedy/Marshall Company, & Perfect World Pictures	$108,533	
13 July 2022	Minions: The Rise of Gru	Universal Pictures & Illumination	$16,057	
27 July 2022	Minions: The Rise of Gru	Universal Pictures & Illumination	$11,690	
3 August 2022	Minions: The Rise of Gru	Universal Pictures & Illumination	$3,646	
10 August 2022	Jurassic World Dominion	Universal Pictures, Amblin Entertainment, The Kennedy/Marshall Company, & Perfect World Pictures	$2,381	
17 August 2022	Beast	Sun Pictures	$17,778	
24 August 2022	Beast	Sun Pictures	$7,971	
31 August 2022	Beast	Sun Pictures	$4,646	
7 September 2022	Beast	Sun Pictures	$2,565	
14 September 2022	Beast	Sun Pictures	$1,400	
28 September 2022	Beast	Sun Pictures	$789	
5 October 2022	Minions: The Rise of Gru	Universal Pictures & Illumination	$263	
12 October 2022	Minions: The Rise of Gru	Universal Pictures & Illumination	$322	
9 November 2022	Prey for the Devil	Gold Circle Films	$4,417	
23 November 2022	Prey for the Devil	Gold Circle Films	$1,198	
30 November 2022	Prey for the Devil	Gold Circle Films	$1,425	
7 December 2022	Prey for the Devil	Gold Circle Films	$1,997	
14 December 2022	Prey for the Devil	Gold Circle Films	$559	
21 December 2022	Prey for the Devil	Gold Circle Films	$778	
28 December 2022	Prey for the Devil	Gold Circle Films	$1,628	

== Box office records ==
- Doctor Strange in the Multiverse of Madness (2022) release in Pakistan 3 days after Eid al-Fitr when five local films already running in theaters from first day of Eid but still manage to surpassed them all at the weekend box office, this angered local producers and they demanded a ban on foreign films but the fans reaction on social media block off the protest as the audience was more interested in watching Doctor Strange.
  - The film earned PKR 70 million in Pakistan in its opening weekend. Its debut set the following records: best opening of 2022, second biggest opening since COVID-19 (after No Way Home), Fourth best opening for an MCU film.
  - Doctor Strange in the Multiverse of Madness later crossed 200 million milestone in Pakistan becoming the second film to do so during the pandemic era after Spider-Man: No Way Home (2021).
  - In July, the film gross more than 230 million becoming the highest-grossing film of 2022 (until it was surpassed by London Nahi Jaunga (2022)), Sixteenth highest-grossing film of all time in Pakistan and 3rd highest grossing MCU film in Pakistan after No Way Home and Avengers: Endgame (2019).
- Top Gun: Maverick (2022) records the second biggest opening for a Tom Cruise film in Pakistan after Mission: Impossible – Fallout.(2018)
  - Additionally, the film surpassed Mission: Impossible – Fallout to become Tom Cruise's highest-grossing film at the Pakistani box office.
- On 23 July, London Nahi Jaunga became the second film of 2022 and third film during the pandemic era to cross the 200 million mark in Pakistan.
  - On 27 July, the film surpassed Doctor Strange in the Multiverse of Madness (2022) to become the highest-grossing film of 2022 at the Pakistani box office.
  - The film records the biggest fourth weekend of 2022 in Pakistan grossing over 2.5 crore.
  - The film grossed PKR 300 million at domestic box office and become the tenth highest-grossing film of all time in Pakistan.
- As of 30 July, Thor: Love and Thunder earned PKR 147.0 million in first three weeks of its release and become the 5th highest grossing MCU film in Pakistan.
- The film The Legend of Maula Jatt records the second biggest domestic box office opening in Pakistan and the biggest for a Pakistani film. The film opened on Friday and grossed 45 million ( including 17.5 million from Thursday night previews) the highest ever opening day in Pakistan. It then collected 34.5 million on Saturday and 33.5 million on Sunday the highest grossed Saturday and Sunday ever, taking its opening weekend total to 113.0 million domestically, surpassing Sultan and JPNA 2 to become the second highest domestic box office opening in Pakistan only behind Avengers: Endgame.(145.0 million).

== Highest-grossing films ==
This is the list of the top 15 highest-grossing films at the Pakistani box office for the year 2022. For worldwide gross, see List of Pakistani films of 2022 and 2022 in film § Highest-grossing films

†	Denotes films still running in theatres

=== In-Year Release ===
Highest-grossing films of 2022 by In-year release in Pakistan
Rank	Film	Domestic gross	Country	Language	Year	Source(s)
1	The Legend of Maula Jatt †	Rs. 103.68 crore (US$3.7 million)	Pakistan	Punjabi	2022	
2	London Nahi Jaunga	Rs. 30.00 crore (US$1.1 million)	Pakistan	Urdu	2022	
3	Doctor Strange in the Multiverse of Madness	Rs. 24.00 crore (US$860,000)	United States	English	2022	
4	Top Gun: Maverick	Rs. 17.70 crore (US$630,000)	United States	English	2022	
5	Quaid-e-Azam Zindabad	Rs. 16.80 crore (US$600,000)	Pakistan	Urdu	2022	
6	Thor: Love and Thunder	Rs. 14.70 crore (US$530,000)	United States	English	2022	
7	Jurassic World Dominion	Rs. 14.45 crore (US$520,000)	United States	English	2022	
8	The Batman	Rs. 12.00 crore (US$430,000)	United States	English	2022	
9	Ghabrana Nahi Hai	Rs. 9.75 crore (US$350,000)	Pakistan	Urdu	2022	
10	Dum Mastam	Rs. 8.00 crore (US$290,000)	Pakistan	Urdu	2022	
11	Avatar: The Way of Water †	Rs. 07.50 crore (US$270,000)	United States	English	2022	
12	Kamli	Rs. 5.02 crore (US$180,000)	Pakistan	Urdu	2022	
13	Parde Mein Rehne Do	Rs. 4.55 crore (US$160,000)	Pakistan	Urdu	2022	
14	Black Panther: Wakanda Forever †	Rs. 4.10 crore (US$150,000)	United States	English	2022	
15	Chakkar	Rs. 3.20 crore (US$110,000)	Pakistan	Urdu	2022	
16	Minions: The Rise of Gru	Rs. 2.90 crore (US$100,000)	United States	English	2022	
As of January 2023; [These are Pakistani box office numbers. For worldwide gross, see List of Pakistani films of 2022]

== Opening weekends ==
The following list shows top highest-grossing opening weekends of 2022 in Pakistan, which include local and Foreign films. These figures are not adjusted for ticket prices inflation.

Rank	Film	Opening Weekend gross	Country	Weekend Days	Ref.
1	The Legend of Maula Jatt	Rs. 11.30 crore (US$400,000)	Pakistan	3	
2	London Nahi Jaunga	Rs. 7.50 crore (US$270,000)	Pakistan	3 (Eid Holidays)	
3	Doctor Strange in the Multiverse of Madness	Rs. 7.00 crore (US$250,000)	United States	3 (Eid Holidays)	
4	Thor: Love and Thunder	Rs. 6.30 crore (US$230,000)	United States	3+ (Eid Holidays)	
5	Quaid-e-Azam Zindabad	Rs. 5.05 crore (US$180,000)	Pakistan	3 (Eid Holidays)	
6	Jurassic World Dominion	Rs. 4.97 crore (US$180,000)	United States	3	
7	The Batman	Rs. 4.50 crore (US$160,000)	United States	3	
8	Ghabrana Nahi Hai	Rs. 3.65 crore (US$130,000)	Pakistan	3 (Eid Holidays)	
9	Top Gun: Maverick	Rs. 3.47 crore (US$120,000)	United States	3	
10	Dum Mastam	Rs. 2.84 crore (US$100,000)	Pakistan	3 (Eid Holidays)	
11	Parde Mein Rehne Do	Rs. 1.95 crore (US$70,000)	Pakistan	3 (Eid Holidays)	
As of 18 October 2022; [These are top opening weekends of 2022 in Pakistan.]

== See also ==
- List of highest-grossing films in Pakistan
- List of highest-grossing Pakistani films
- Lists of Pakistani films
- Cinema of Pakistan
- Lists of highest-grossing films
