= Aag Lagay Basti Mein =

2026 Pakistani film by Bilal Atif Khan

- Theatrical release poster
- آگ لگے بستی میں
- Directed by: Bilal Atif Khan
- Written by: Naeem Ali; Bilal Atif Khan
- Starring: Fahad Mustafa; Mahira Khan; Jawed Sheikh; Tabish Hashmi
- Cinematography: Abid Rizvi
- Edited by: Rasheed Khan; Salman Noorani; Bilal Atif Khan
- Production companies: Big Bang Films; Salman Iqbal Films
- Distributed by: ARY Films
- Release date: 21 March 2026
- Running time: 140 minutes
- Country: Pakistan
- Language: Urdu
- Box office: Rs. 101.06 crore (US$3.6 million)

Aag Lagay Basti Mein (Urdu: آگ لگے بستی میں, romanised: Āg lagē bastī mēṁ, lit. 'May there be fire in the township') is a 2026 Pakistani Urdu-language crime comedy film written and directed by Bilal Atif Khan. The film stars Fahad Mustafa and Mahira Khan as a struggling married couple who become involved in crime, with Jawed Sheikh and Tabish Hashmi in supporting roles.

The film was released theatrically in Pakistan during Eid al-Fitr 2026. The film grossed over Rs. 101.06 crore worldwide, becoming the second highest-grossing Pakistani film ever behind The Legend of Maula Jatt and the second Pakistani film to join the Rs. 100 crore club.

== Premise ==
Barkat is an honest but financially struggling cleaner who lives with his wife Almaas. Almaas is frustrated by their poverty and dreams of escaping their circumstances by moving to Dubai. Their modest life changes when the couple decide to steal money, believing that petty crime can improve their situation.

Their initial theft leads to a chain of escalating problems involving rival criminals, kidnapping, ransom and violence. As Barkat and Almaas are drawn deeper into the criminal world, their relationship is tested by greed, mistrust and the consequences of trying to find a shortcut out of poverty.

== Cast ==
- Fahad Mustafa as Barkat
- Mahira Khan as Almaas
- Jawed Sheikh as Marble Seth
- Tabish Hashmi as Changaiz
- Salahuddin Tunio
- Ali Abdullah
- Samra Shehzadi
- Hafiz Raza Ahmed
- Osama Ateeq
- Khizr Ansari
- Ali Abdullah Durrani
- Shabbir Jan
- Shamim Hilaly
- Ashraf Khan
- Ayub Khoso
- Mohammed Ehteshamuddin

== Production ==
Aag Lagay Basti Mein was written and directed by Bilal Atif Khan. Pre-release coverage described the film as a commercial entertainer combining comedy, action and romance, centred on the strained relationship between Barkat and Almaas. The teaser presented the story through the fable of a hen that lays golden eggs, using it as a metaphor for greed and unintended consequences.

The film was produced by Big Bang Films and Salman Iqbal Films and presented by ARY Films. It marked the second film collaboration between Mustafa and Khan after Quaid-e-Azam Zindabad. The film also marked Mustafa's first on-screen appearance with his father, veteran actor Salahuddin Tunio, who confirmed that he had a brief role in the film.

Mahira Khan said that Almaas was different from her earlier roles and required her to play against her usual nature. Debuting artists in the film also include the social media influencers Samra Shehzadi, Hafiz Raza Ahmed, Khizr Ansari, Ali Abdullah Durrani, and Osama Ateeq.

Abid Rizvi served as the cinematographer, and he also used wide-angle camera lenses ranging from 18mm to 35mm. Rasheed Khan, Salman Noorani, and Bilal Atif Khan as well served as the film editors.

== Soundtrack ==
Aag Lagay Basti Mein

Soundtrack album by various artists
- Released: 14 March 2026
- Length: 9:41
- Label: ARY Films
External audio
- Full Album playlist on YouTube

The soundtrack album for Aag Lagay Basti Mein was released on various music streaming services on 14 March 2026.

Original Motion Picture Soundtrack
| No. | Title | Writer(s) | Vocal(s) | Length |
|---|---|---|---|---|
| 1. | "Aag Lagay Basti Mein" | Aashir Wajahat, Savage | Aashir Wajahat, Savage | 2:10 |
| 2. | "Phir Kabhi" | Asim Azhar, Haider Ali, Kumail Abbas, Raamis Ali | Asim Azhar (Harmony vocals: Sabri Sisters) | 3:08 |
| 3. | "Dill Bechara" | Raffey Anwar, Ahad Khan, Usama Ali | AUR | 4:23 |
| Total length: | | | | 9:41 |

== Release ==
The film's teaser was released on 3 January 2026. Its official trailer was released in February 2026. Dawn reported that the film was part of the 2026 Eid al-Fitr release slate alongside Bullah and Delhi Gate.

The film was also released in overseas markets. Daily Times reported that its international listings included cinemas in the United States, the United Kingdom, the United Arab Emirates, Canada and Australia.

== Reception ==
=== Box office ===
Pakistani Cinema reported that Aag Lagay Basti Mein grossed Rs. 16.2 crore (US$580,000) in Pakistan during its opening weekend and Rs. 11 crore (US$390,000) from overseas markets including North America, the United Arab Emirates, the United Kingdom and Australia. 24 News HD later reported that the film had grossed more than Rs. 42 crore (US$1.5 million) worldwide, including more than Rs. 26 crore (US$930,000) in Pakistan and Rs. 16 crore (US$570,000) from international markets.

On 17 April 2026, Pakistani Cinema reported that the film had grossed Rs. 86 crore (US$3.1 million) worldwide, including Rs. 54.5 crore (US$1.9 million) in Pakistan and Rs. 31.5 crore (US$1.1 million) overseas. The same report stated that the film had become ARY Films highest-grossing release worldwide and the second-highest-grossing Pakistani film of all time, unadjusted for inflation. The film eventually grossed over Rs. 101.06 crore (US$3.6 million) during its lifetime theatrical run, becoming the second highest-grossing Pakistani film ever behind the The Legend of Maula Jatt and the second Pakistani film to join the Rs. 100 crore club.

Box Office Mojo reported a worldwide gross of US$937,672 from its tracked markets, comprising US$454,890 from the United States and Canada and US$482,782 from other international markets. Its listed overseas breakdown included US$324,087 from the United Arab Emirates, US$80,706 from the United Kingdom and US$78,041 from Australia.

=== Critical response ===
Eefa Khalid of Images wrote that the film was aimed clearly at Pakistani audiences and praised its local humour, stylised look and comic situations by acknowledging it as a "comedy of errors" and "situational dark comedy" instead of having a tightly structured narrative. She highlighted Mahira Khan's performance as a departure from her usual screen image and said Tabish Hashmi handled his role well.

Mohammad Kamran Jawaid of Dawn also praised by calling it a "whip-smart, well-rounded film" whose "screenplay was polished well before it went on set".

Sadiq Saleem of Khaleej Times praised Khan's performance, called her a "revelation", and that she led the film's comic chaos. He described Mustafa as the "film's anchor", while adding that his characterisation was close to roles he had already played in his earlier films.

Yousuf Mehmood of Pakistani Cinema praised the supporting characters, and called Hashmi the film's "best thing". He also praised Khan for playing against type and singled out the song "Dil Bechara" as a highlight, but criticised the film's length, slow first half, familiar romantic subplot and repeated moralising.

Muhammad Suhayb of Youlin Magazine criticised the casting of television actors in leading roles, compared the film climax with that of the 1998 film Enemy of the State as "copy pastes" with "little logic and lots of bullets", and praised the soundtrack. He concluded by calling it "a success" with "fallen" standards.

== See also ==
- List of highest-grossing Pakistani films
- List of Pakistani films of 2026
