= Neelofar (film) =

2025 Pakistani film

- Theatrical release poster
- Urdu: نیلوفر
- Directed by: Ammar Rasool
- Written by: Ammar Rasool
- Produced by: Hassaan Khalid; Fawad Khan; Qasim Mahmood; Usaf Shariq
- Starring: Mahira Khan; Fawad Khan
- Music by: Zeeshan Vicky Haider
- Distributed by: Hum Films; Distribution Club (Pvt.) Limited
- Release date: 28 November 2025
- Running time: 118 minutes
- Country: Pakistan
- Languages: Urdu; English
- Budget: Rs. 12 crore (US$430,000)
- Box office: Rs. 11.6 crore (US$410,000)

Neelofar (Urdu: نیلوفر) is a 2025 Pakistani romantic drama film written and directed by Ammar Rasool. It stars Mahira Khan and Fawad Khan as a lead pair. The film is co-produced by Fawad Khan. Neelofer marks the third on-screen collaboration between Fawad Khan and Mahira Khan, following their appearances in Humsafar and The Legend of Maula Jatt.

The film was released on 28 November 2025 to mixed-to-negative reviews, with critics pointing to its slow pacing, a weak plot, and a lack of chemistry between the leads. It ultimately struggled at the box office.

== Plot ==
Mansoor Ali Khan (Fawad Khan), a celebrated Urdu novelist, returns to Lahore for a literary festival after years abroad. At an eye clinic, he has a chance encounter with Neelofar (Mahira Khan), a visually impaired young woman who experiences the city through sound, scent, and silence. Their connection deepens into a quiet winter romance against the backdrop of Lahore's misty streets and old havelis. However, as their bond grows, Mansoor's fame and the pressures of digital culture and public scrutiny begin to threaten their relationship, forcing both to confront the cost of visibility and the nature of truly seeing one another.

== Cast ==
- Mahira Khan as Neelofar
- Fawad Khan as Mansoor Ali Khan
- Madiha Imam as Sarah Rana
- Samiya Mumtaz as Dr. Shagufta Hussain
- Faisal Qureshi as Dr. Hasan Mehmood
- Behroze Sabzwari as Fahkru
- Rashid Farooqi as Tanveer
- Atiqa Odho as Begum Kashif
- Gohar Rasheed as Firoz Ashraf
- Navid Shahzad as Dadi
- Adeel Hashmi
- Sarwat Gilani
- Seemi Raheel
- Hira Tareen
- Chand Baral

== Production ==
Principal photography for the film concluded in December 2020. In this film, Mahira Khan plays the role of a blind girl.

In an interview in June 2024, Fawad Khan said that Neelofar was "almost in its completion phase", marking the reunion of his on-screen pairing with Mahira after their earlier successful work together. The film is written and directed by Ammar Rasool and is co-produced by Fawad Khan among others.

== Soundtrack ==
Neelofer

Soundtrack album by Zeeshan Vickey Haider
- Released: 25 October 2025
- Recorded: 2019–2022
- Genre: Feature film soundtrack
- Length: 19:14
- Language: Urdu
- Label: Sufiscore
External audio
- Audio Jukebox on YouTube

Music video of "Tu Meri" was released as the first song from the movie on Sufiscore's official channel, followed by "Tum He Ho" and "Socha Nahi". The complete album was released on 25 October 2025 via various music streaming services by Sufiscore.

In an exclusive interview with Quill Quest Magazine, composer Zeeshan Vicky Haider revealed that the film's key tracks, "Tu Meri" and "Ja Rahe", were personal compositions written prior to the film's production during his move from Karachi to Lahore, rather than being commissioned specifically for the movie. Haider also disclosed that while the production team initially discussed hiring mainstream singers, they ultimately retained his original vocals to preserve the emotional authenticity of the songs. Lead actor Fawad Khan was also reported to be actively involved in guiding the film's background score.

All tracks are written by Zeeshan Vickey Haider, who is also the singer.

No.	Title	Length
1.	"Tu Meri"	3:20
2.	"Tum He Ho"	2:58
3.	"Ja Rahe"	3:34
4.	"Socha Nahi"	3:16
5.	"Toutay"	2:42
6.	"Ja Rahe" (Reprised)	3:24
Total length:		19:14

== Release ==
Originally scheduled for a 23 December 2022 theatrical release, it was postponed for unspecified reasons. The film premiere event was held on 27 November 2025 at CUE Cinemas in Lahore. It was released on 28 November 2025.

=== Digital media ===
The film was scheduled for its television premiere on Hum TV during the Eid al-Fitr 2026 programming.

== Reception ==
=== Box office ===
The film opened with only PKR 8.5 million on its first day and earned PKR 3.1 crore domestically by the end of its opening weekend. Over its first six days, the film managed a domestic total of PKR 4.66 crore, while its worldwide total was reported at just PKR 11.6 crore far below its production budget of PKR 18 crore and an estimated PKR 20 crore spent on promotions. By the end of its theatrical run, the film's international markets contributed $119,413 (approximately Rs. 3.34 crore), with the UAE ($61,825), UK ($36,921), and Australia ($20,667) being the top territories. Domestically, later trade reports indicated the film's collection eventually reached over Rs. 8 crore. Ultimately, due to its high costs and low returns, the film was declared a major box office failure.

=== Critical response ===
Neelofar received mixed to negative reviews from critics and audiences. In a review for Gulf News, Manjusha Radhakrishnan wrote that despite the "incredible spark" between Fawad Khan and Mahira Khan, the film fails to rescue a "hollow romance." She praised the lead pair's chemistry but noted that the script does not give them enough to work with.

The Express Tribune described the film as "a story of love, silence, and rediscovery," acknowledging its ambitious themes but noting that the execution felt uneven.

In a review for Dawn Images, the film was noted for its "soft start, quiet frames, steady build," with the first half dwelling on a slow-burning winter romance against Lahore's misty streets. The reviewer praised the "controlled, nuanced performances" of Fawad Khan and Mahira Khan, though felt their chemistry was "slightly muted." The second half was criticized for shifting abruptly to themes of digital culture and tabloid sensationalism, with important ideas racing forward "without enough breathing room." Lahore itself was praised for being shown "without beautifying it into perfection."

Yousuf Mehmood of PakistaniCinema.Net gave the film a scathing review, titled "Too Much and Not Enough at the Same Time." He praised the presentation of Lahore and the performances of Mahira Khan and Fawad Khan, noting that "Lahore has arguably never looked better" and that Khan's "sugar bowl personality lends itself to her character well." However, he criticized the film for being "overstuffed with subplots and ideas that derail it from its core message," calling the subplot about Urdu literature "basic, shallow fluff" and noting that the film "gives you a lot of crumbs and morsels of ideas that could've been fully explored. Yet, they don't go anywhere."

== Awards and nominations ==
Year	Award	Category	Recipient	Result	Ref(s)
2026	4th Pakistani Cinema Awards	Best Playback Singer	Zeeshan Vicky for "Ja Rahe"	Won	
2026	4th Pakistani Cinema Awards	Best Background Score	Neelofar	Won	
2026	4th Pakistani Cinema Awards	Best Sound Design	Neelofar	Won	
2026	4th Pakistani Cinema Awards	Best Production Design	Neelofar	Won	
2026	4th Pakistani Cinema Awards	Best Cinematography	Richie Yau	Won	
2026	Sunday Special Icon Awards	Best Actor – Film	Fawad Khan	Nominated	

== See also ==
- List of Pakistani films of 2025
