= The Donkey King =

2018 film by Aziz Jindani

- Theatrical release poster
- Directed by: Aziz Jindani
- Written by: Aziz Jindani; Kamran Khimani
- Starring: Jan Rambo; Ismail Tara; Hina Dilpazeer; Ghulam Mohiuddin; Jawed Sheikh
- Edited by: Faisal Shaikh
- Music by: Various artists Shani Arshad (score)
- Production company: Talisman Animation Studios
- Distributed by: Geo Films; Pantera Film
- Release date: 13 October 2018
- Running time: 105 min
- Country: Pakistan
- Language: Urdu
- Box office: Rs. 40.20 crore (US$1.4 million)

The Donkey King (Urdu: danki king) is a 2018 Pakistani animated comedy film, directed by Aziz Jindani. The film features the voices of Jan Rambo, Ismail Tara, Hina Dilpazeer, Ghulam Mohiuddin, and Jawed Sheikh. It was released in Pakistan on 13 October 2018 by Geo Films and Talisman Animation Studios. After its national success, it became the first Pakistani film to be dubbed into ten languages for multiple international theatrical releases, distributed worldwide by Annalisa Zanierato, for Pantera Film.

It is currently Pakistan's highest-grossing animated feature film ever, and also one of the highest-grossing Pakistani films overall.

== Plot ==
Mangu is an insignificant donkey washer who dreams of fame and riches. Though his uncle, Pehelwan Chacha, discourages his dreams, the spirit of his father Changu often appears to tell him to keep dreaming. Mangu's land is ruled by the elite Big Cats who live off the herbivores. Many protests are often held at this by the public, which are futile. While delivering his laundry, Mangu enters the castle and meets the crafty senior adviser, Miss Fitna. Meanwhile, the aging King Badshah Khan informs Fitna that he wishes to forfeit the crown to his incompetent and self absorbed child Shahzada Khan. When Fitna influences the animals against this through propaganda, the King decides on a form of 'democracy', thinking that no one will be able to stand up to Shahzada.

Miss Fitna and her cohorts vainly look for a suitable candidate. Then Miss Fitna remembers the naive donkey who will be easily influenced. Mangu agrees to the campaign after encouragement from his father. He and Shahzada compete for the crown through many hilarious ways, like press talks and rap battles, while Fitna supports Mangu through influencing the news and reverse psychology. Eventually, Mangu makes an inspirational speech from the bottom of his heart that wins over the animals. The Cats are exiled and Mangu starts to live a life of luxury in the palace and neglects his duties as the leader of the jungle. Meanwhile, Fitna secretly has an agenda of her own. She serves the human ringmaster and kidnaps the animals for his circus. Mangu accidentally stumbles upon their prison. He realizes his mistakes, apologizes to the animals and stops Fitna's party. Fitna falls off the cliff into the sea. The public and the Cats fix their problems and accept Mangu as their King. Meanwhile, Changu's spirit moves on, convinced that his son has achieved his dreams.

== Cast ==
=== Urdu version ===
- Afzal Khan as Jan Mangu, a washer's donkey who wants to be the king of Azadnagar
- Hina Dilpazeer as Miss Fitna, a red fox who is personal secretary to the king
- Ghulam Mohiuddin as Badshah Khan, a lion who is the king of Azadnagar
- Adeel Hashmi as Shahzada Khan, the son of Badshah Khan
- Faisal Qureshi as Breaking News Monkey anchor
- Salman Saqib Sheikh as Rangeela, a chameleon
- Jawed Sheikh as Changu, Mangu's father
- Ismail Tara as Pehalwan Chacha, Changu's brother and Subadar a black rhinoceros
- Shafaat Ali as Ronald Crump, a hippopotamus version of Donald Trump
- Irfan Khoosat as Jamboora, a chimpanzee who is the media house owner; and Raftaar, a tortoise
- Shabbir Jan as Sardar Chacha, a grizzly bear politician
- Sahiba Afzal as Mangu's love interest
- Ahsan Rahim as Mr. Propaganda, a Siberian tiger
- Irfan Malik as Panoti, a zebra
- Ali Hassan as Raja Uncle
- Zirgham Amir Khan as a Khota
- TBA as Jake, a Hyena

=== English version ===
- Kenny Knox as Mangu
- Mark Dohner as Prince Shazad
- Bobbi Hartley as Miss Fitna
- Jay Snyder as Badshah Khan
- Mike Pollock as Changu
- Tyler Bunch as Uncle Perry
- Jason Yudoff as Jambora
- Steve Tardio as Godzilla
- Dave Wills as Zandar
- Billy Bob Thompson as Monkey News Reporter
- Rory Mac Kaplan as Bad Luck Brian
- David McDonald as Rapid, Lando
- Jim O' Brian as Bull Bros
- Starr Bursby as Rebecca Hippo

== Production ==
In August 2018, the first look of the animated film was released, directed by Aziz Jindani, developed and produced by Talisman Animation Studios and Geo Films. Jindani revealed that he had the idea of the film since 2003, and had started working on the film in 2013 while working on his Commander Safeguard animated series. The film stars the voices of Jan Rambo, Ismail Tara, Hina Dilpazeer, Ghulam Mohiuddin, Shabbir Jan, Jawed Sheikh and others.

In 2016, Aziz founded Talisman Animation Studios, an animation studio based in Karachi and begin the work on the Donkey King, the film was animated on Autodesk Maya & rendered on Fox Renderfarm.

The teaser of the film was released on August 20, and the trailer was released on September 23.

== Release ==
The release date announced for the film was 13 October 2018, though it released a day earlier. It was premiered on the same day at Nueplex Cinemas, in DHA, Karachi.

As of 2020, Donkey King had been released in ten countries worldwide with local dubbings. It became the first Pakistani film to release in South Korea on 28 August 2019, and in Spain on 4 October 2019, where it was dubbed into three languages – Spanish, Catalan and Basque – and released under the titles El Rey Burro, El Rei Ruc and Asto Erregea respectively at 50 screens across the country. It released in Russia on 5 December with a Russian dub and across 100 screens in Turkey on 20 December in Turkish dub. It was scheduled to release in Colombia on 9 January 2020. It also released in Peru on 13 February 2020. The film released in China on 19 November 2021.

=== Home media ===
The Donkey King had a world television premiere on third day of Eid al-Fitr, in May 2020 on Geo Entertainment and Geo News. It was the most watched television premiere in Pakistan.

=== Digital media ===
On 23 June 2020, Janson Media released the trailer of The Donkey King where they told that it will be available for streaming on July 3; in UK, Canada and United States, the film is available to stream on Amazon Prime Video in English language.

== Controversy ==
Prior to its release, a legal petition was made that demanded a ban on the film due to its title song making fun of the Raja caste. However, this was dismissed by the Islamabad High Court. Another political controversy involved the resemblance of the position of lead character to prime minister Imran Khan so as to mock the term of the Prime Minister and his government. Videos related to the film also appeared online, but Geo Films and Talisman Animation Studios clarified them legally.

== Box office ==
The film recorded the biggest opening in Pakistan for any animated film, collecting Rs. 36 lakh. It also recorded the biggest single day for animated films by hitting the Rs. 1 crore mark locally on its second day. It also beat the one week record of Allahyar and the Legend of Markhor at local box office within just a weekend, by collecting around Rs. 2.75 crore. It made over Rs. 4 crore in its first week. The film earned Rs. 3.78 crore on its second weekend, which is more than the gross of its first weekend. It became the highest grossing Pakistani animated film within its second week, breaking the previous local box office record of 3 Bahadur: The Revenge of Baba Balaam having about Rs. 8.1 crore. It made Rs. 9.1 crore in its two weeks. It then also recorded second biggest third weekend for any Pakistani film, behind Jawani Phir Nahi Ani 2, by collecting Rs. 3.85 crore, which is itself greater than its second weekend.

It collected more than Rs. 5 crore in its third week, with recording the bigger numbers on third Tuesday than previous ones. It made up to Rs. 16.95 crore in its first four weeks. It recorded the biggest fifth weekend for any film at Pakistani box office with collecting around Rs. 1.3 crore, and made up to Rs. 18.65 crore in five weeks. It crossed Rs. 20 crore in its sixth weekend, again making the weekend biggest for any Pakistani film as well as for any release on local box office. It again grossed high numbers in seventh and eighth weeks, which made the film gross up to Rs. 22.25 crore.

The film was listed as #1 blockbuster Pakistani film of 2018 by Mohammad Kamran Jawaid of Dawn. At local box office, it made Rs. 24.5 crore in 17 weeks, and Rs. 24.75 crore in lifetime 25 weeks.

As of 4 December 2021, the international gross of the film has crossed Rs. 20 crore, becoming second Pakistani film to do so after Jawani Phir Nahi Ani 2. The numbers include about Rs. 16 crore from China in two weeks only, leaving behind Parwaaz Hai Junoon's box office gross from China.

Special tracks
No.	Title	Lyrics	Music	Singer(s)	Length
4.	"Allah Meharban"	Aziz Jindani, Asrar	Shani Arshad	Asrar
5.	"Be Adab Be Mulahiza" (Bonus track)	Aziz Jindani, Asrar	Majid Raza, Asrar	Aima Baig, Asrar
6.	"Khotay Da Puttar" (Father's Day special track)	Aziz Jindani, Asrar	Majid Raza, Asrar	Asrar
7.	"Darna Nahi Larna Hai" (Coronavirus special track)	Aziz Jindani	Shuja Haider, Asrar	Asrar

== See also ==
- List of Pakistani animated films
- List of Pakistani films of 2018
- Cartoon Network (Pakistani TV channel)
