= Aziz Jindani =

Pakistani filmmaker

- عزیز جنداڻي
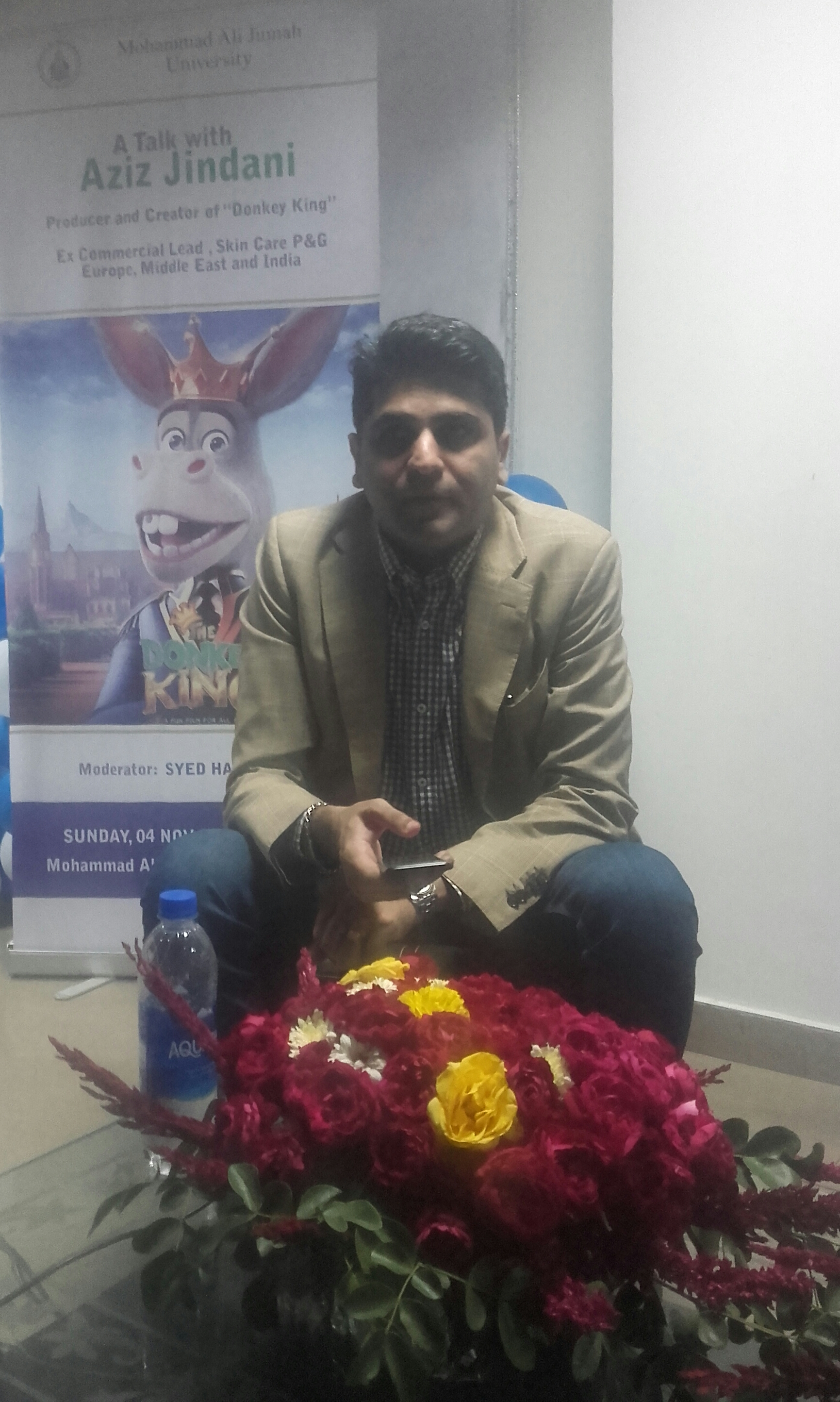
- Aziz Jindani in November 2018 at Mohammad Ali Jinnah University, Karachi
- Born: Jindani; Karachi, Pakistan
- Citizenship: Pakistani
- Occupations: director, writer, producer
- Years active: 2005–present
- Known for: The Donkey King (2018)

Aziz Jindani (Sindhi: عزیز جنداڻي) is a Pakistani film director, screenwriter, producer, and a computer graphics artist. He is best known for the director of the film The Donkey King and TV show Commander Safeguard.

== Career ==
In 2005, he worked on the first season of Commander Safeguard as a director and head of production. The TV show garnered many accolades. This animated show was famous among kids because it spread the message to stay neat & clean all the time. This show was a promotional cartoon for Safeguard soap.

In 2016, Aziz founded Talisman Studios, an animation studio based in Karachi and began work on his first feature film. His film, The Donkey King, was released nationwide on 13 October 2018 to positive reviews and broke the first week record for an animated film at the Pakistani box office. It went on to become the highest-grossing animated film in Pakistan's history.

Jindani is the co-director of the upcoming animated feature film My Daddy My Superhero that is set to release in 2025.

== Filmography ==
=== Film ===
==== As director ====
Year	Title	Notes
2018	The Donkey King	Debut as film director
2025	My Daddy My Superhero	

=== Television ===
==== As director ====
Year	Title	Episodes
2005–2016	Commander Safeguard	14
