= Love Guru (2025 film) =

2025 Pakistani film by Nadeem Baig

- Theatrical release poster
- Urdu: لو گرو
- Directed by: Nadeem Baig
- Screenplay by: Vasay Chaudhry
- Produced by: Humayun Saeed; Jarjees Seja; Shahzad Nasib
- Starring: Humayun Saeed; Mahira Khan
- Cinematography: Suleman Razzaq
- Edited by: Rizwan AQ
- Music by: Various artists
- Production companies: ARY Films; Salman Iqbal Films; Six Sigma Plus
- Distributed by: ARY Films
- Release date: 6 June 2025
- Country: Pakistan
- Language: Urdu
- Budget: Rs. 28 crore (US$1.0 million)
- Box office: Rs. 80 crore (US$2.9 million)

Love Guru is a 2025 Pakistani romantic comedy film directed by Nadeem Baig and written by Vasay Chaudhry. Starring Humayun Saeed and Mahira Khan, the story follows a "love guru", a flirtatious man who is hired by a father to woo his daughter and prevent her marriage.

The film was released on 6 June 2025 (Eid al-Adha) under the banners of ARY Films, Salman Iqbal Films, and Six Sigma Plus.

== Premise ==
In an interview with UK newspaper Eastern Eye, Humayun Saeed told the outlet he plays a "love guru who helps people find love and get married – until he is tasked with breaking up the forthcoming wedding of the character" played by Mahira Khan.

== Cast ==
- Humayun Saeed as Adil / Hamza Abbasi (fake identity)
- Mahira Khan as Sophia Khan, an architect
- Ahmad Ali Butt as Ali Ahmed
- Jawed Sheikh as Khan; Sophia's father who is a Pashtun billionaire residing in London
- Ramsha Khan as Kiran Qureshi; Sophia's friend
- Momina Iqbal in a special appearance
- Mira Sethi in a special appearance
- Sohai Ali Abro in a special appearance
- Ammara Malik
- Vardah Aziz
- Mohib Mirza
- Adnan Shah Tipu
- Marina Khan
- Annie Zaidi
- Usman Peerzada
- Mani Liaqat
- Natalia Janoszek
- Vasay Chaudhry in a cameo appearance

== Production ==
=== Development ===
In October 2019, actor-producer Humayun Saeed and writer Vasay Chaudhry revealed that scriptwriting is under way for upcoming films to be directed by Nadeem Baig, one of them was under the working title Love Guru Hoja Shuru.

Pre-production began when the film was announced in March 2023, with the writer, director, and producers of Jawani Phir Nahi Ani franchise fame. Mahira Khan was cast, who re-united with Saeed after 2015 film Bin Roye and its subsequent TV series. She had been offered a number of projects by Saeed meanwhile, but she kept refusing due to her scheduling conflict and her interest in other genres. She revealed to Gulf News that she signed this film after much discussions and only because it is a romantic comedy.

=== Filming ===
First schedule of principal photography began from February 2024 in Karachi, while second schedule took place in London during October and November 2024. Suleman Razzaq served as the cinematographer, and Rizwan AQ as film editor. (Note: Credits extracted from the film trailer on YouTube by ARY Digital official channel)

== Soundtrack ==
Love Guru

Soundtrack album by various artists
- Released: 19 May 2025
- Genre: Soundtrack
- Length: 20:08
- Label: ARY Films
External media
Audio
- Full Album playlist on YouTube
Video
- "Aa Tenu" on YouTube
- "Bekhabreya" on YouTube

The soundtrack album for Love Guru was released on various music streaming services on 19 May 2025. "Sada Ashna" (Pashto song) has been choreographed by Nigah Hussain, while "Raat Ke Hain Sayai" has been picturized on Ramsha Khan. Additionally, a sixth song "Aa Tenu" was filmed in UAE and released on 20 May, featuring Arif Lohar, Roach Killa, and Fiza Ali.

Original Motion Picture Soundtrack
No.	Title	Lyrics	Music	Singer(s)	Length
1.	"Love Guru"	Adnan Dhool, Faris Shafi (rap)	Adnan Dhool	Adnan Dhool, Faris Shafi	2:55
2.	"Bekhabreya"	Mubashir Hasan	Shiraz Uppal	Shiraz Uppal, Nirmal Roy	4:14
3.	"Toot Gaya"	Saad Sultan, Tahir Abbas	Saad Sultan	Yashal Shahid, Farhan Saeed, Zain, Zohiab, Saad Sultan	5:01
4.	"Raat Ke Hain Sayai"	Rizwan Hassan	Shani Arshad	Aima Baig	3:59
5.	"Sada Ashna" (Pashto song)	Junaid Kamran Siddique	Junaid Kamran Siddique, Shani Arshad	Junaid Kamran Siddique	3:59
Total length:					20:08

== Release ==
The trailer of the film was released on 4 May during Karachi Kings–Lahore Qalandars rivalry match at Gaddafi Stadium, Lahore. It became the first Pakistani film to have its trailer screened at the Times Square. The film was released on the occasion of Eid al-Adha, 6 June 2025 along with another film Deemak, in 15 countries. The film had a premiere event in Lahore on 5 June 2025.

=== Home Media ===
The film was released on ARY Plus for digital streaming on Eid al-Fitr 2026.

== Reception ==
=== Box office ===
Love Guru was released on Eid al-Adha in June 2025 and recorded a strong opening at the Pakistani box office. The film earned approximately PKR 120 million in its opening week, surpassing the first-week gross of The Legend of Maula Jatt (PKR 110 million).

During its opening weekend, the film collected around PKR 12.8 crore in Pakistan, with its worldwide total reported at approximately PKR 28 crore.

According to Dawn, the film was among the titles attracting large audiences during the Eid holiday period, contributing to combined early earnings of around PKR 140 million alongside other releases.

Subsequent reports indicated that the film continued to perform steadily in both domestic and overseas markets. It had reportedly grossed approximately PKR 280 million worldwide within its early run, including an estimated PKR 130 million domestically and PKR 150 million internationally.

Within nine days of release, the film's worldwide gross was reported at approximately PKR 55 crore. By 17 days, it had reached around PKR 70 crore globally, including about PKR 37.05 crore from Pakistan and the remainder from overseas territories. The film collected over Rs. 80 crore (US$2.9 million) in its lifetime run at the global box office including a collection of over Rs. 45 crore (US$1.6 million) at the local box office, becoming the highest grossing Pakistani film of 2025.

Internationally, the film recorded earnings in markets including the United Kingdom, United Arab Emirates, North America, and Australia.

=== Critical response ===
Khurram Suhail of Dawn News praised the film's cinematography, presentation, Humayun Saeed's acting, and Mahira Khan's wardrobe and styling, but criticized the screenplay, casting, and many other issues. Azadar Kazmi of PakistanCinema.net also praised the direction, cinematography, and the lead cast, and noted the engaging dialogues despite having the dragging scenes. Gaitee Ara Siddiqi called the story being "painfully predictable" while writing for The News, and criticized the "chemistry between the lead couple", calling Khan as "saving grace of the film" but Saeed as disappointing. Mohammad Kamran Jawaid wrote down "four big pluses and three minuses" in his review in Dawn, which includes appreciation for lead actors' "magnetism and charisma" and the screenwriter's "narrative decisions", while criticism over the climax and colour grading.

== Awards and nominations ==
Year	Award	Category	Recipient	Result	Ref(s)
2026	4th Pakistani Cinema Awards	Best Original Song	"Toot Gaya" – Saad Sultan, Tahir Abbas	Won	
2026	4th Pakistani Cinema Awards	Best Editing	Rizwan AQ	Won	
2026	Sunday Special Icon Awards	Best Supporting Actor (Film)	Ahmed Ali Butt	Won	
2026	Sunday Special Icon Awards	Best Director (Film)	Nadeem Baig	Won	
2026	Sunday Special Icon Awards	Best Actor Female (Film)	Mahira Khan	Nominated	
2026	Sunday Special Icon Awards	Best Actor Male (Film)	Humayun Saeed	Nominated	
2025	Eurasian Open Film Awards (Diamond Butterfly)	Official Selection	Love Guru	Selected	

== See also ==
- List of Pakistani films of 2025
