= List of highest-grossing films in Pakistan =

The following is a list of the highest-grossing films in Pakistan, with gross revenue in Pakistani rupees. This is not an official tracking of figures, as reliable sources that publish data are frequently pressured to increase their estimates. For a list of the highest-grossing Pakistani films worldwide, see List of highest-grossing Pakistani films.

== Highest-grossing films ==
The Legend of Maula Jatt is the highest-grossing film of all time in Pakistan, it was released in October 2022.

This is the list of the top 22 highest-grossing films of all time released in Pakistan. These figures are not adjusted for ticket prices inflation.

| * | Denotes films still running in theatres |

| Rank | Film | Total gross | Country of origin | Language | Year | Reference(s) |
|---|---|---|---|---|---|---|
| 1 | The Legend of Maula Jatt | Rs. 115.02 crore (US$4.1 million) | Pakistan | Punjabi | 2022 | |
| 2 | Spider-Man: Brand New Day† | Rs. 58.29 crore (US$2.1 million) | United States | English | 2026 | |
| 3 | Jawani Phir Nahi Ani 2 | Rs. 53.00 crore (US$1.9 million) | Pakistan | Urdu | 2018 | |
| 4 | Sanju | Rs. 37.60 crore (US$1.3 million) | India | Hindi | 2018 | |
| 5 | Teefa in Trouble | Rs. 36.00 crore (US$1.3 million) | Pakistan | Urdu / Punjabi | 2018 | |
| 6 | Punjab Nahi Jaungi | Rs. 35.85 crore (US$1.3 million) | Pakistan | Urdu / Punjabi | 2017 | |
| 7 | Parwaaz Hai Junoon | Rs. 35.00 crore (US$1.3 million) | Pakistan | Urdu | 2018 | |
| 8 | Jawani Phir Nahi Ani | Rs. 34.00 crore (US$1.2 million) | Pakistan | Urdu | 2015 | |
| 9 | Spider-Man: No Way Home | Rs. 34.00 crore (US$1.2 million) | United States | English | 2021 | |
| 10 | Sultan | Rs. 33.00 crore (US$1.2 million) | India | Hindi | 2016 | |
| 11 | Avengers: Endgame | Rs. 31.00 crore (US$1.1 million) | United States | English | 2019 | |
| 12 | London Nahi Jaunga | Rs. 30.00 crore (US$1.1 million) | Pakistan | Urdu | 2022 | |
| 13 | The Fate of the Furious | Rs. 26.70 crore (US$960,000) | United States | English | 2017 | |
| 14 | Fast X | Rs. 26.00 crore (US$930,000) | United States | English | 2023 | |
| 15 | Furious 7 | Rs. 25.03 crore (US$900,000) | United States | English | 2015 | |
| 16 | Dhoom 3 | Rs. 25.00 crore (US$890,000) | India | Hindi | 2013 | |
| 17 | The Donkey King | Rs. 24.50 crore (US$880,000) | Pakistan | Urdu | 2018 | |
| 18 | Doctor Strange in the Multiverse of Madness | Rs. 24.00 crore (US$860,000) | United States | English | 2022 | |
| 19 | Actor in Law | Rs. 24.00 crore (US$860,000) | Pakistan | Urdu | 2016 | |
| 20 | PK | Rs. 23.50 crore (US$840,000) | India | Hindi | 2014 | |
| 21 | Bajrangi Bhaijaan | Rs. 23.20 crore (US$830,000) | India | Hindi | 2015 | |
| 22 | Avengers: Infinity War | Rs. 23.00 crore (US$820,000) | United States | English | 2018 | |
| 23 | Waar | Rs. 23.00 crore (US$820,000) | Pakistan | Urdu / English | 2013 | |
As of August 2026; [Please note that these are domestic box office numbers. For worldwide gross, see List of highest-grossing Pakistani films.]

== Domestic films ==
Choorian was the first film ever to cross the 20 crore mark in Pakistan and it was released back in 1998. Jawani Phir Nahi Ani 2 is the first movie to cross the 50 crore mark and The Legend of Maula Jatt is the first and only movie to cross the 100 crore mark in Pakistan.

This is the list of the highest-grossing Pakistani films within local Pakistani cinemas, which include films from all the Pakistani languages. These figures are not adjusted for ticket prices inflation.

| * | Denotes films still running in theatres |

| Rank | Film | Total gross | Language | Year | Source(s) |
|---|---|---|---|---|---|
| 1 | The Legend of Maula Jatt | Rs. 305.02 crore (US$15.0 million) | Punjabi | 2022 | |
| 2 | Jawani Phir Nahi Ani 2 | Rs. 53.00 crore (US$1.9 million) | Urdu | 2018 | |
| 3 | Teefa in Trouble | Rs. 36.00 crore (US$1.3 million) | Urdu / Punjabi | 2018 | |
| 4 | Punjab Nahi Jaungi | Rs. 35.85 crore (US$1.3 million) | Urdu / Punjabi | 2017 | |
| 5 | Parwaaz Hai Junoon | Rs. 35.00 crore (US$1.3 million) | Urdu | 2018 | |
| 6 | Jawani Phir Nahi Ani | Rs. 34.00 crore (US$1.2 million) | Urdu | 2015 | |
| 7 | London Nahi Jaunga | Rs. 30.00 crore (US$1.1 million) | Urdu | 2022 | |
| 8 | The Donkey King | Rs. 24.50 crore (US$880,000) | Urdu | 2018 | |
| 9 | Actor in Law | Rs. 24.00 crore (US$860,000) | Urdu | 2016 | |
| 10 | Waar | Rs. 23.00 crore (US$820,000) | Urdu / English | 2013 | |
| 11 | Superstar | Rs. 21.00 crore (US$750,000) | Urdu | 2019 | |
| 12 | Na Maloom Afraad 2 | Rs. 21.00 crore (US$750,000) | Urdu | 2017 | |
| 13 | Parey Hut Love | Rs. 21.80 crore (US$780,000) | Urdu | 2019 | |
| 14 | Wrong No. 2 | Rs. 20.20 crore (US$720,000) | Urdu | 2019 | |
| 15 | Choorian | Rs. 20.00 crore (US$720,000) | Punjabi | 1998 | |
| 16 | Chhalawa | Rs. 17.50 crore (US$630,000) | Urdu | 2019 | |
| 17 | Janaan | Rs. 17.50 crore (US$630,000) | Urdu / Pashto | 2016 | |
| 18 | Yalghaar | Rs. 16.50 crore (US$590,000) | Urdu / English | 2017 | |
| 19 | Ho Mann Jahaan | Rs. 15.75 crore (US$560,000) | Urdu | 2016 | |
| 20 | Khuda Kay Liye | Rs. 15.06 crore (US$540,000) | Urdu | 2007 | |
| 21 | Quaid-e-Azam Zindabad | Rs. 15.00 crore (US$540,000) | Urdu | 2022 | |
| 22 | Wrong No. | Rs. 15.00 crore (US$540,000) | Urdu | 2015 | |
| 23 | Na Maloom Afraad | Rs. 12.20 crore (US$440,000) | Urdu | 2014 | |
| 24 | Mehrunisa V Lub U | Rs. 12.18 crore (US$440,000) | Urdu | 2017 | |
| 25 | Bol | Rs. 12.00 crore (US$430,000) | Urdu | 2011 | |
| 26 | Sherdil | Rs. 11.53 crore (US$410,000) | Urdu | 2019 | |
| 27 | Baaji | Rs. 11.40 crore (US$410,000) | Urdu | 2019 | |
| 28 | 7 Din Mohabbat In | Rs. 10.75 crore (US$380,000) | Urdu | 2018 | |
| 29 | Bin Roye | Rs. 10.50 crore (US$380,000) | Urdu | 2015 | |
| 30 | Karachi Se Lahore | Rs. 10.30 crore (US$370,000) | Urdu | 2015 | |
| 31 | Bachaana | Rs. 10.00 crore (US$360,000) | Urdu | 2016 | |
| 32 | Ghabrana Nahi Hai * | Rs. 9.75 crore (US$350,000) | Urdu | 2022 | |
| 33 | Parchi | Rs. 9.60 crore (US$340,000) | Urdu | 2018 | |
| 34 | Load Wedding | Rs. 9.50 crore (US$340,000) | Urdu / Punjabi | 2018 | |
| 35 | Lahore Se Aagey | Rs. 9.00 crore (US$320,000) | Urdu | 2016 | |

== Foreign films ==
Spider-Man: No Way Home records the biggest opening weekend for any film during the COVID-19 pandemic in Pakistan, third highest for a Hollywood release which grossed nearly 9.2 crore, highest-grossing film during COVID-19, and Pakistan is one of the few countries where Spider-Man: No Way Home has managed to surpass the record of Avengers: Endgame to become the highest grossing Hollywood film in the country. Doctor Strange in the Multiverse of Madness released in Pakistan 3 days after Eid al-Fitr when five local films were already running in theaters from Eid Day 1 but still managed to surpass them all. This angered local producers and they demanded a ban on foreign films but the fans' reaction on social media blocked off the protest as the audience was more interested in watching Doctor Strange which later became the highest-grossing film of 2022 at the Pakistani box office where it grossed more than 23 crore.

This is the list of the highest-grossing Foreign films released in Pakistan. These figures are not adjusted for ticket prices inflation.

† Denotes films still running in theaters

| Rank | Film | Total gross | Country | Language | Year | Source(s) |
|---|---|---|---|---|---|---|
| 1 | Spider-Man: Brand New Day† | Rs. 58.29 crore (US$2.1 million) | United States | English | 2026 | |
| 2 | Sanju | Rs. 37.60 crore (US$1.3 million) | India | Hindi | 2018 | |
| 3 | Sultan | Rs. 33.00 crore (US$1.2 million) | India | Hindi | 2016 | |
| 4 | Avengers: Endgame | Rs. 31.00 crore (US$1.1 million) | United States | English | 2019 | |
| 5 | The Fate of the Furious | Rs. 26.70 crore (US$960,000) | United States | English | 2017 | |
| 6 | Fast X | Rs. 26.00 crore (US$909,808) | United States | English | 2023 | |
| 7 | Furious 7 | Rs. 25.03 crore (US$900,000) | United States | English | 2015 | |
| 8 | Dhoom 3 | Rs. 25.00 crore (US$890,000) | India | Hindi | 2013 | |
| 9 | Doctor Strange in the Multiverse of Madness | Rs. 24.00 crore (US$860,000) | United States | English | 2022 | |
| 10 | PK | Rs. 23.50 crore (US$840,000) | India | Hindi | 2014 | |
| 11 | Bajrangi Bhaijaan | Rs. 23.20 crore (US$830,000) | India | Hindi | 2015 | |
| 12 | Avengers: Infinity War | Rs. 23.00 crore (US$820,000) | United States | English | 2018 | |
| 13 | Padmaavat | Rs. 22.50 crore (US$800,000) | India | Hindi | 2018 | |
| 14 | Hobbs & Shaw | Rs. 22.00 crore (US$790,000) | United States | English | 2019 | |
| 15 | Simmba | Rs. 21.50 crore (US$770,000) | India | Hindi | 2018 | |
| 16 | Dilwale | Rs. 20.05 crore (US$720,000) | India | Hindi | 2015 | |
| 17 | Top Gun: Maverick | Rs. 17.70 crore (US$630,000) | United States | English | 2022 | |
| 18 | The Lion King | Rs. 16.65 crore (US$600,000) | United States | English | 2019 | |
| 19 | Kick | Rs. 16.35 crore (US$580,000) | India | Hindi | 2014 | |
| 20 | Jurassic World: Fallen Kingdom | Rs. 16.10 crore (US$580,000) | United States | English | 2018 | |
| 21 | Thugs of Hindostan | Rs. 15.50 crore (US$550,000) | India | Hindi | 2018 | |
| 22 | Mission: Impossible – Fallout | Rs. 15.20 crore (US$540,000) | United States | English | 2018 | |
| 23 | Zero | Rs. 15.10 crore (US$540,000) | India | Hindi | 2018 | |
| 24 | Baaghi 2 | Rs. 15.00 crore (US$540,000) | India | Hindi | 2018 | |
| 25 | Thor: Love and Thunder | Rs. 14.70 crore (US$530,000) | United States | English | 2022 | |
| 26 | John Wick: Chapter 4 | Rs. 14.50 crore (US$501,369) | United States | English | 2023 | |
| 27 | Jurassic World Dominion | Rs. 14.45 crore (US$520,000) | United States | English | 2022 | |
| 28 | Oppenheimer | Rs. 14.40 crore (US$503,776) | United States | English | 2023 | |
| 29 | Avengers: Age of Ultron | Rs. 13.80 crore (US$490,000) | United States | English | 2015 | |
| 30 | Happy New Year | Rs. 13.15 crore (US$470,000) | India | Hindi | 2014 | |
| 31 | The Batman | Rs. 12.00 crore (US$430,000) | United States | English | 2022 | |
| 32 | Aladdin | Rs. 12.00 crore (US$430,000) | United States | English | 2019 | |
| 33 | Golmaal Again | Rs. 12.00 crore (US$430,000) | India | Hindi | 2017 | |
| 34 | Jab Harry Met Sejal | Rs. 11.10 crore (US$400,000) | India | Hindi | 2017 | |
| 35 | Fan | Rs. 11.00 crore (US$390,000) | India | Hindi | 2016 | |
| 36 | Jurassic World | Rs. 10.55 crore (US$380,000) | United States | English | 2015 | |
| 37 | Spider-Man: Far From Home | Rs. 10.01 crore (US$665,852) | United States | English | 2019 | |
| 38 | Jumanji: The Next Level | Rs. 10.00 crore (US$360,000) | United States | English | 2019 | |
| 39 | Kapoor & Sons | Rs. 9.95 crore (US$360,000) | India | Hindi | 2016 | |
| 40 | Chennai Express | Rs. 9.75 crore (US$350,000) | India | Hindi | 2013 | |
| 41 | Mission: Impossible – Rogue Nation | Rs. 9.65 crore (US$350,000) | United States | English | 2015 | < |
| 42 | Welcome Back | Rs. 9.55 crore (US$340,000) | India | Hindi | 2015 | |
| 43 | Gully Boy | Rs. 9.50 crore (US$340,000) | India | Hindi | 2019 | |
| 44 | Jumanji: Welcome to the Jungle | Rs. 9.40 crore (US$891,577) | United States | English | 2017 | |
| 45 | Deadpool & Wolverine | Rs. 7.75 crore (US$278,000) | United States | English | 2024 | |
| 46 | Spider-Man: Homecoming | Rs. 7.01 crore (US$665,551) | United States | English | 2017 | |
| 47 | Venom | Rs. 6.47 crore (US$531,883) | United States | English | 2018 | |
| 48 | John Wick: Chapter 3 – Parabellum | Rs. 6.30 crore (US$416,317) | United States | English | 2019 | |

== Highest-grossing openings in Pakistan ==
This is the list of the highest-grossing opening weekends released in Pakistan. Since many films do not open on Fridays, the 'opening' is taken to be the gross between the first day of release and the first Sunday following the movie's release. These figures are not adjusted for ticket prices inflation.

| Denotes films release in current year. |

| Rank | Film | Opening Weekend gross | Country | Language | Year | Source(s) |
|---|---|---|---|---|---|---|
| 1 | Avengers: Endgame | Rs. 14.50 crore (US$520,000) | United States | English | 2019 | |
| 2 | The Legend of Maula Jatt | Rs. 11.30 crore (US$400,000) | Pakistan | Punjabi | 2022 | |
| 3 | Sultan | Rs. 11.00 crore (US$390,000) | India | Hindi | 2016 | |
| 4 | Jawani Phir Nahi Ani 2 | Rs. 10.13 crore (US$360,000) | Pakistan | Urdu | 2018 | |
| 5 | Fast X | Rs. 09.73 crore (US$340,204) | United States | English | 2023 | |
| 6 | Spider-Man: No Way Home | Rs. 9.12 crore (US$330,000) | United States | English | 2021 | |
| 7 | The Fate of the Furious | Rs. 9.00 crore (US$320,000) | United States | English | 2017 | |
| 8 | Hobbs & Shaw | Rs. 8.51 crore (US$300,000) | United States | English | 2019 | |
| 9 | Avengers: Infinity War | Rs. 8.00 crore (US$290,000) | United States | English | 2018 | |
| 10 | Deadpool & Wolverine | Rs. 7.75 crore (US$278,000) | United States | English | 2024 | |
| 11 | Punjab Nahi Jaungi | Rs. 7.57 crore (US$270,000) | Pakistan | Urdu / Punjabi | 2017 | |
| 12 | London Nahi Jaunga | Rs. 7.50 crore (US$270,000) | Pakistan | Urdu / Punjabi | 2022 | |
| 13 | Furious 7 | Rs. 7.25 crore (US$260,000) | United States | English | 2015 | |
| 14 | Teefa in Trouble | Rs. 7.21 crore (US$260,000) | Pakistan | Urdu / Punjabi | 2018 | |
| 15 | Doctor Strange in the Multiverse of Madness | Rs. 7.00 crore (US$250,000) | United States | English | 2022 | |
| 16 | Oppenheimer | Rs. 5.75 crore (US$202,754) | United States | English | 2023 | |
| 17 | The Lion King | Rs. 5.00 crore (US$180,000) | United States | English | 2019 | |
| 18 | Jurassic World Dominion | Rs. 4.97 crore (US$180,000) | United States | English | 2022 | |
| 19 | Mission: Impossible – Fallout | Rs. 4.85 crore (US$170,000) | United States | English | 2018 | |
| 20 | The Batman | Rs. 4.50 crore (US$160,000) | United States | English | 2022 | |
| 21 | Spider-Man: Far From Home | Rs. 3.78 crore (US$252,988) | United States | English | 2019 | |
| 22 | Thor: Love and Thunder | Rs. 3.60 crore (US$130,000) | United States | English | 2022 | |
| 23 | Top Gun: Maverick | Rs. 3.47 crore (US$120,000) | United States | English | 2022 | |
| 24 | John Wick: Chapter 4 | Rs. 3.45 crore (US$120,814) | United States | English | 2023 | |
| 25 | Jurassic World: Fallen Kingdom | Rs. 3.45 crore (US$120,000) | United States | English | 2018 | |

== See also ==
- List of highest-grossing Pakistani films
- Lists of highest-grossing films
- List of 2022 box office number-one films in Pakistan
- List of 2023 box office number-one films in Pakistan
