= Deemak =

2025 Pakistani horror film by Rafay Rashdi

- Theatrical release poster
- Urdu: دیمک
- Directed by: Rafay Rashdi
- Written by: Ayesha Muzzafar
- Produced by: Syed Murad Ali
- Starring: Faysal Quraishi; Sonya Hussyn; Samina Peerzada
- Cinematography: Rana Kamran
- Edited by: Rizwan AQ
- Music by: Sohaib Rashidi
- Production company: Wah Wah Productions
- Distributed by: Geo Films; Mandviwalla Entertainment
- Release date: 6 June 2025
- Running time: 113 minutes
- Country: Pakistan
- Language: Urdu
- Box office: Rs. 20.6 crore (US$740,000)

Deemak (lit. 'Termite') is a 2025 Pakistani horror family drama film directed by Rafay Rashdi with screenplay by Ayesha Muzaffar. It stars Faysal Quraishi, Sonya Hussyn, and Samina Peerzada.

The film was released on Eid al-Adha, 6 June 2025, by Wah Wah Productions, Geo Films, and Mandviwalla Entertainment.

== Premise ==
The story follows a family encountering paranormal disturbances in their home, which fuel friction between Fraz's wife and his mother, each doubting the other's sense of reality, while the Fraz finds himself struggling to balance his role as a loving husband and a loyal son. According to the director, the film "explores complex family relationships, social issues, and paranormal elements".

== Cast ==
- Faysal Quraishi as Faraz
- Sonya Hussyn as Hiba, Faraz's wife
- Samina Peerzada as Kulsoom Begum, Faraz's mother
- Bushra Ansari
- Jawed Sheikh as Mehmood,Faraz's father
- Saman Ansari as Hiba's mother
- Anaya Abbas
- Aarez Abbas

== Production ==
Deemak was announced in November 2023, with author Ayesha Muzaffar and director Rafay Rashdi, along with the starring actor names. Muzaffar told The Express Tribune that this film would mark her venture into horror screenplay as well, having the "story of a thousand Pakistani houses with a supernatural element to it".

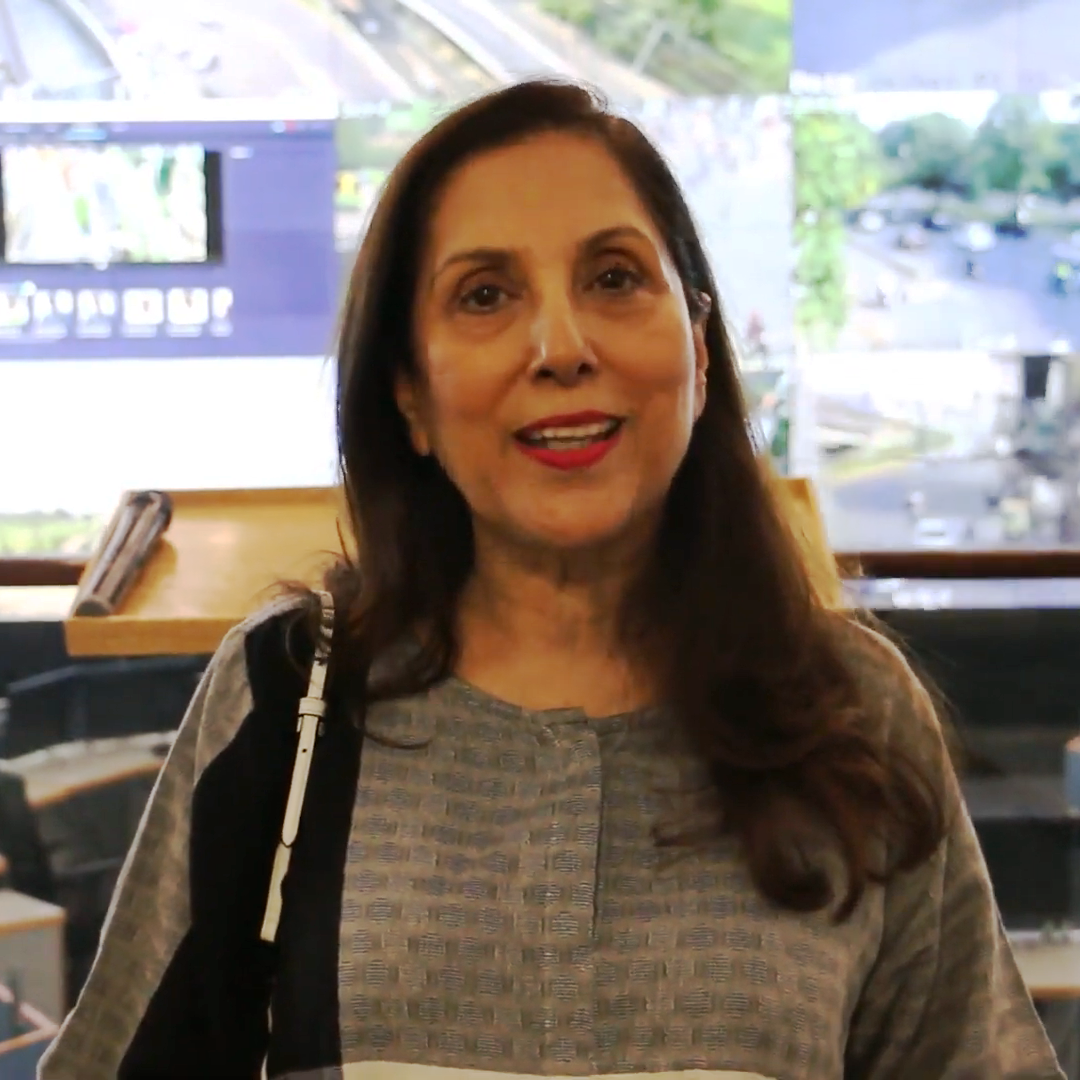
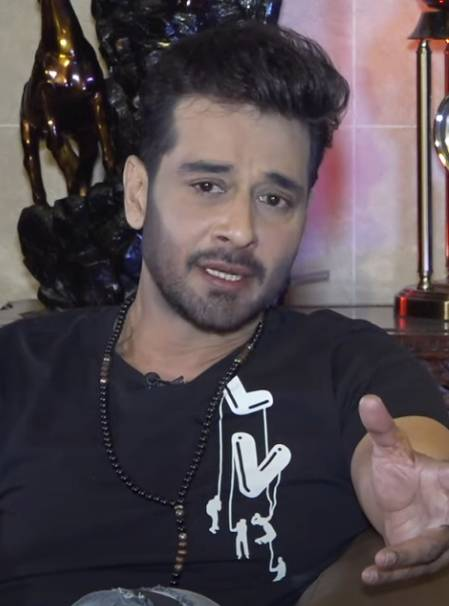
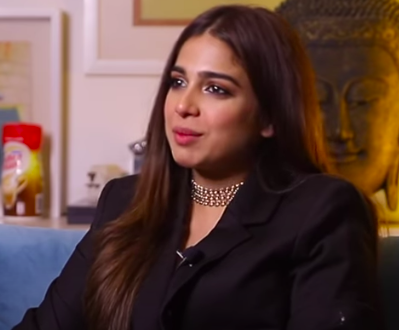
Geo Digital reported that it will be a family film, in which Peerzada (left) would be playing the mother of Quraishi's (middle) character, while Hussyn (right) be his wife.

Rashdi told BBC Urdu that when the script was ready after his discussions with Muzaffar for past few years, Samina Peerzada was the first to join in. Then Faysal Quraishi was cast, who would be returning to mainstream cinema after more than 25 years. Then came Sonya Hussyn, and then further cast members. Independent Urdu reported that the film depicts COVID-19 pandemic in Pakistan and has no songs in it. The actors had to perform imaginary acts as well, so that the jinns can be inserted in the scenes afterwards. The post-production phase took about one year.

With a limited budget, they hired Julia Millais of Imagine Magic FX, a Canadian VFX producer, and tried making horror look real instead of just jump scares. Syed Murad Ali served as the executive producer under Wah Wah Productions, Rana Kamran as cinematographer, Sohaib Rashdi as the film score composer, Mehboob Shah as stunt coordinator, and Rizwan AQ as the film editor. (Note: Credits extracted from the film trailer on YouTube by Har Pal Geo official channel)

== Release ==
The film teaser was released in December 2024, while the film trailer in March 2025. Deemak was released on 6 June, on the occasion of Eid al-Adha, alongside another film Love Guru, and was distributed by Geo Films and Mandviwalla Entertainment. Internationally, the film was released in October 2025.

== Reception ==
=== Box office ===
The film was premiered on 1 June 2025 at Nueplex Cinemas in Karachi. It grossed Rs. 7 crore within two days, and continued to collect Rs. 17.50 crore till 24 September 2025. According to director Rafay Rashdi, Deemak exceeded expectations, collecting PKR 17.7 crore domestically and PKR 2.9 crore from overseas markets, for a lifetime worldwide total of PKR 20.6 crore.

=== Critical reception ===
Mishal Zarrar of Brandsynario appreciated film's performances, concept, storyline, cinematography, and sound design, while noted that the VFX could have been "far better". Similarly, for The Express Tribune, Manahil Tahira prasied the performances, however, stated that this "ghost story" is "haunted by its own potential" due to the "GTA-gameplay-style CGI ghosts". Sara Danial wrote in Dawn Images that the "visual effects are handled well" considering limited horror history in Pakistani cinema, and "it stays committed to its story" with its "restrained, atmospheric, and unsettling in ways that feel personal".

Yousuf Mehmood of PakistaniCinema.net also criticized the VFX and runtime, but commented that it "manages to stay fresh" due to the "performances". In Dawn, Farheen Jawaid called it "an undercooked yet good-looking horror film", and despite having a "weaker" narrative and "unsatisfactory" climax, it is "one of the better ones from Pakistani cinema".

At the Shanghai Cooperation Organization Film Festival in China, the film won the award for Best Editing.

== Accolades ==
Year	Award	Category	Recipient	Result	Ref(s)
2025	SCO Film Festival	Best Editing Award	Deemak	Won	
2025	Eurasian Open Film Awards (Diamond Butterfly)	Best Supporting Actress	Sonya Hussyn	Won	
2026	4th Pakistani Cinema Awards	Best Film of the Year	Deemak	Won	
2026	4th Pakistani Cinema Awards	Best Director	Rafay Rashdi	Won	
2026	4th Pakistani Cinema Awards	Best Actor in Leading Role (Female)	Samina Peerzada	Won	
2026	4th Pakistani Cinema Awards	Best Actor in Supporting Role (Male)	Faysal Quraishi	Won	
2026	4th Pakistani Cinema Awards	Best Actor in Supporting Role (Female)	Sonya Hussyn	Won	
2026	4th Pakistani Cinema Awards	Best Screenwriter	Ayesha Muzaffar	Won	
2026	Sunday Special Icon Awards	International Best Actor Achievement Award	Sonya Hussyn	Won	
2026	Sunday Special Icon Awards	Best Actor – Film	Faysal Quraishi	Nominated	
2026	Sunday Special Icon Awards	Best Supporting Actor – Film	Samina Peerzada	Nominated	

== See also ==
- List of Pakistani films of 2025
