= Jujji =

Pakistani crime thriller film

- Promotional poster
- Directed by: Habib Shahzad
- Written by: Ahmad Umar Ayaz
- Produced by: Habib Shahzad; Mathew Helderman; Ali Osama Chaudhry
- Starring: Muhammad Arslan; Mustafa Rizvi; Anjum Habibi
- Cinematography: Furqan Gul
- Production company: BHM Films
- Distributed by: Buffalo 8
- Release dates: 2024 (Film festivals); November 21, 2025 (US, UK)
- Running time: 73 minutes
- Country: Pakistan
- Language: Urdu

Jujji is a 2025 Pakistani independent neo-noir crime thriller film written by Ahmad Umar Ayaz and produced, directed by Habib Shahzad under banner of BHM Films in collaboration with Yugen Studios. The film stars Muhammad Arslan as the titular Jujji alongside Mustafa Rizvi and Anjum Habibi. The story is loosely inspired by a real case of a serial killer masseur in Rawalpindi named Ejaz alias Jajji who allegedly killed clients while giving them a massage.

The film, inspired by true events, is the first feature length project released by BHM Films and was a partnered production with Yugen Studios and Lollipop. It was acquired for worldwide distribution by Buffalo 8 and released on-demand on Amazon Prime and Verizon Fios on 21 November 2025. The film was released worldwide on Plex Tv and Fawsome in January 2026 .

== Plot ==
The film opens with a masseur (Muhammad Arsalan) describing how certain massage techniques can prevent serious neck injuries. In Rawalpindi, Sub-Inspector Naveed (Mustafa Rizvi) and Constable Arshad (Anjum Habibi) are working a night shift when they are alerted to the murder of Munshi, a homeless shoe-shiner. Munshi is found with his neck cleanly broken and his shoe-shining box missing. Naveed, hoping to redeem himself for past professional mistakes, asks SHO Cheema to let him investigate the case.

Naveed visits the market where Munshi worked and learns from a tea seller that Munshi had recently lost his shoe-shining box and had no known conflicts. While Naveed attempts to balance the investigation with caring for his ill daughter, the autopsy report reveals that Munshi’s neck was snapped with unusual precision. The doctor notes similar deaths in the district involving unidentified or marginalized individuals, with one exception: an eighteen-year-old named Sunny.

Naveed and Arshad visit Sunny’s parents, who explain that no inquiry was conducted into their son’s death. They direct the officers to Sunny’s former employer, a mechanic who admits having previously beaten Sunny but denies involvement in his death. With no clear leads, Naveed and Arshad discuss whether the killings could be linked by a specific skill set. Arshad’s mention of wrestlers leads Naveed to consider whether someone trained in manipulating the neck could be responsible.

At a local wrestling compound, the head coach explains the strength and technique required to protect or injure the neck and mentions that wrestlers regularly receive massages to avoid injury. Concluding that a masseur might be responsible, Naveed orders local masseurs to be questioned. Among them is Ijaz, who objects to the officers' treatment but offers no useful information.

Arshad later reports that an eyewitness saw Sunny with a masseur before his death, and a composite sketch is prepared. Struggling with memories of a past case that ended in tragedy, Naveed returns to the market for a moment of quiet. There, Ijaz offers him a massage and repeats remarks about the difficulty of snapping a neck. When paying, Naveed notices that Ijaz is wearing a ring missing a stone similar to one Arshad had earlier wanted fashioned into a ring. Naveed then receives the completed suspect sketch, which matches Ijaz.

Naveed confronts Ijaz, who attempts to flee. After a chase, Naveed shoots and apprehends him. Ijaz, also known as Jujji, is arrested for the series of murders.

The film ends with Naveed narrating that some murderers kill themselves, some kill people they know, and some kill strangers whose names they never learn.

== Cast ==
- Muhammad Arslan as Ijaz/Jujji; a masseur and serial murderer in downtown Rawalpindi who commits murders by severing his victims skulls from their spines.
- Mustafa Rizvi as SI Naveed; a police officer haunted by his past mistakes as an officer and seeking to make up for them by getting justice for the nameless faceless victims of Jujji.
- Anjum Habibi as Constable Arshad; Naveed's partner. He is a superstitious man who habitually pilfers precious stones from the civilians he encounters believing the stones will protect him from harm.
- Shabir Khan as Constable Nadeem
- Mazhar Malik as SHO Cheema
- Mahnoor Nawab as Mahnoor/Naveed's Wife
- Arfa Nadeem as Fatima/Naveed's Daughter
- Hassan Shehryar as Mechanic Shop Owner
- Muhammad Ali Bhatti as Master Wrestler Butt Sahab
- Farhan Rasool Bajwa as Tea Stall Owner
- Faiz Khan as Munshi
- Anjum Malik as Sunny's father
- Khair-un-Nisa as Sunny's mother
- Adeel Yusuf Khan as Biker
- Muhammad Ali as the Morgue Doctor
- Jamal Habib Khan as Ali
- Hamza Arfat as Ahmed
- Qasim Mughal as Suspect Masseur
- Muhammad Adeel as Father of Ransom girl

== Production ==
Director Habib Shahzad developed the project independently without major studio backing. The film was self-financed, drawing inspiration from a local criminal incident, and was completed in 2024 although it initially struggled to secure theatrical distribution in Pakistan due to the absence of major stars.

After screenings at local festivals, the film was acquired by United States-based distributor Buffalo 8.

Filming took place entirely on location in Rawalpindi using real alleys, neighbourhoods and police stations, with minimal artificial lighting to emphasise a grounded visual style.

== Release ==
=== Festival screenings ===
According to distributor and trade sources, Jujji premiered at the Gandhara Independent Film Festival 2024 where it won Best Film. It also received Best Feature at the Punjab Police Film Festival 2024 and was selected for the Divvy Film Festival in 2024.

=== Streaming ===
In 2025, Jujji was acquired by Buffalo 8, two years after its production. It was released on November 21, 2025 on Amazon Prime and Verizon Fios in the US and UK as an on-demand feature.

A broader international release including Pakistan is expected in early 2026.

== Reception ==
=== Critical response ===
Jujji has met positive reviews upon its release. Critics who previewed the film described it as “a crime drama and a mirror held up to Pakistan's collective conscience” with praise to the score for its “minimalist precision” that “accentuates moments of silence as much as violence.” 2 Buffalo 8's Nikki Stier defined the film as “bold” and “genre defying” which made it stand out as authentic South Asian storytelling that challenges conventions and displays the evolution of independent filmmaking which prompted the studio to acquire and distribute the film internationally.

Nick of THEDONTTELLSHOW praised the film for being vibrant and alive, “shot with a cinematic eye; the type of film they say doesn't exist anymore.” Nick disagrees and states Jujji as evidence of such quality filmmaking being alive and well, albeit, outside of conventional Hollywood. Jason Knight of UKFR praised the direction and cinematography of the film and described the soundtrack as somber and unsettling in a way that contributes to the film’s atmosphere.

Connor Ashdown-Ford of Movie Fest UK called the film “measured, intimate and honest” and praised the film's focus on the internal narratives of the characters and the pain left in the wake of violence rather than the sensationalism of the crime itself. Vimala Mangat of Gazettely had similar positive reviews stating the film’s suspense comes from its “social reality” and the attention to Naveed’s interior life balancing the psychological toll of acquiring justice and its costs. She further praises the film as remaining “in conversation with [South Asian] parallel cinema’s patience” and praises the director’s refusal to give into spectacle and dive into the procedural that keeps the film locked into realism allowing for a larger presence of the city’s social texture throughout.

=== Accolades ===
Award	Category	Result	Ref.
Divvy Film Festival 2024	Official Selection	Honored	
Gandhara Film Festival 2024	Best Film Award	Honored	
Punjab Police Film Festival 2024	Best Feature Film Award	Honored	
