= Commander Safeguard =

Pakistan's first animated superhero series

- Genre: Kids Show
- Created by: Imtisal Abbasi (IAL Saatchi & Saatchi)
- Opening theme: Pak Pak Pakistan
- Country of origin: Pakistan
- Original language: Urdu
- No. of seasons: 1
- No. of episodes: 14

Production
- Executive producers: Tahir Malik; Hans Dewaele
- Producers: IAL Saatchi & Saatchi
- Production location: Pakistan
- Running time: 15–20 minutes

Original release
- Network: Webcast
- Release: 27 January 2005 – September 9, 2016

Related
- Team Muhafiz

Commander Safeguard is Pakistan's first animated superhero series produced by the Pakistani advertising agency IAL Saatchi & Saatchi and animated by Post Amazers. The titular character, a superhero, is popular in Pakistan and in Mexico, where it is known as Capitan Escudo. The superhero is depicted as a representation of Safeguard (soap) who fights and defeats the germs led by a character called "Dirtoo"(Leader of Germs). The cartoon was originally broadcast in Pakistan's national language Urdu. It is one of the most popular children's animated television series in Pakistan.

== The television series ==
Commander Safeguard's Mission: Clean Sweep, commonly known as Commander Safeguard, is the first Pakistani "3D Animated Series". It is sponsored by Procter & Gamble Pakistan, The show was produced and animated by Post Amazers to promote hand washing habits among children. The animated series was created to augment the educational material on health and hygiene.

== Episodes and seasons ==
To date, 12 episodes (excluding two independence day special episodes) varying in length from 15 to 20 minutes have been aired on many Pakistani TV channels. Episode 7, Commander Safeguard's Mission: Double Trouble was the longest episode ever which was 24 mins long, and divided into 2 parts. This episode marked Germander's debut appearance.

It is one of the most popular local TV shows for children in Pakistan. Episode 12, known as Commander Safeguard's Mission: Back To School, has the same name as 2010 10th Episode. Episode 12 is the shortest among all the episodes with only 13 minutes.

In July 2016, a short movie called 'Commander Safeguard's Mission: Clean Sweep: Jungle Main Mungle', was broadcast. It was the first short movie to be produced by Second Sense Post Production instead of Post Amazers. It ran for 15 minutes and featured Dirtoo trying to sicken children by adding germs to the food of children who did not wash their hands with soap. However Commander Safeguard defeated him.

== Cast ==
Voice actor	Role
Shafiq-ur-Rehman	Commander Safeguard & Dirtoo
Alyy Khan	Commander Safeguard (2015)
Ahmed Ali Butt	Dirtoo (2015)
Mustafa Qureshi	Germander
Bushra Ansari	Dirtee
Behroze Sabzwari	Ghunsunna
Ameer Ali	Moti Behs
N/A	Kachra Rani
Saleem Hasan	Algham
Talat Hussain	School Teacher
Aziz Jindani	School Teacher
Ameer Ali	Doctor Uncle
Isnain Khan	Ali & Daniyal
Ameer Ali	Kulsoom (Dirty)
Mateen Mahmood	Dr. Zibago

== Adaptations ==
In 2005, it was adapted in the Philippines as Captain Hugas and broadcasts in English-Filipino bilingualism.

In 2007, it was adapted in Mexico as Capitan Escudo.

On April 18, 2012, it was adapted in Africa, notably Kenya as Africa's Local Super Hero - Commander Safeguard.

== Production credits ==
- Ahmed Khalilullah, VFX director, idea representer, managing director – Morocco
- Aziz Jindani, Brand Manager, Global franchise Procter & Gamble, United States
- Salman Butt, Brand Manager, Safeguard, Procter & Gamble, Pakistan
- Mubashara Khalid, Brand Manager, Safeguard, Procter & Gamble, Pakistan
- Ahmed Rizvi, Assistant Brand Manager, Safeguard, Procter & Gamble, Pakistan
- Saad Munawar Khan, Assistant Brand Manager, Safeguard, Procter & Gamble, Pakistan
- Tahir Malik, Director Marketing, Procter & Gamble Pakistan
- Imtisal Abbasi, Creative Director, IAL Saatchi & Saatchi
