= Parde Mein Rehne Do =

2022 Pakistani film by Wajahat Rauf

- Theatrical poster
- Urdu: پردے میں رہنے دو
- Directed by: Wajahat Rauf
- Written by: Mohsin Ali
- Produced by: Wajahat Rauf; Shazia Wajahat; Wajahat Ali Abbasi
- Starring: Javed Sheikh; Hania Aamir; Ali Rehman Khan
- Cinematography: Asrad Khan
- Edited by: Hasan Ali Khan
- Music by: Aashir Wajahat; Hassan Ali Hashmi
- Production company: Showcase Productions
- Distributed by: Eveready Pictures; Geo Films
- Release date: 3 May 2022 (Eid al-Fitr)
- Running time: 90 minutes
- Country: Pakistan
- Language: Urdu
- Box office: PKR 50 million

Parde Mein Rehne Do (lit. 'Let it stay veiled') is a 2022 Pakistani social romantic comedy film written by Mohsin Ali, directed and produced by Wajahat Rauf under Showcase Films. It stars Hania Aamir and Ali Rehman Khan. It was released on Eid al-Fitr, 3 May 2022, by Eveready Pictures and Geo Films.

== Plot ==
The film revolves around a young married couple, Nazo and Shani, who are unable to have a child for years.

== Cast ==
- Hania Aamir as Nazish "Nazo"
- Ali Rehman Khan as Kashaan Rana "Shani", Nazo's husband who has male infertility issue
- Jawed Sheikh as Latif Rana, Shani's father
- Munazzah Arif as Samreen, Shani's mother
- Muhammad Hasan Raza as Jedi
- Noor ul Hassan as Shafiq Rana
- Zayn Khan as Shafi
- Sadia Faisal as Laraib Rana "Lali"
- Shafqat Khan as Dabeer
- Sonia Nazir as Sonia, Nazo's colleague
- Saife Hassan as Nazo's father

Additionally, Dananeer Mobeen and Yasir Hussain also appear.

== Production ==
Wajahat Rauf announced on 1 March 2020 that he began the production of his new film, titled Parde Mein Rehne Do, with his wife Shazia Wajahat as an executive producer. While Hania Aamir already knew about Mohsin Ali's story, Rauf joined as director and producer afterwards and wanted a strong male character, so he cast Ali Rehman Khan. They had an intention to release the film that year, but after half a course of 18 days, the filming was paused on 19 March due to the COVID-19 pandemic in Pakistan. Later, after the lockdown restrictions lifted, the principal photography was resumed and wrapped-up on 22 February 2021 after the other 18 days, following the post-production phase.

== Soundtrack ==
Parde Mein Rehne Do

Soundtrack album by Aashir Wajahat, Hassan Ali Hashmi
- Recorded: 2020–21
- Language: Urdu; Punjabi
- Label: Showcase

All tracks are written by Aashir Wajahat and Hassan Ali Hashmi.

No.	Title	Singer(s)	Length
1.	"Peela Rung"	Hassan Ali Hashmi, Nehaal Naseem
2.	"Chal Chalein"	Hassan Ali Hashmi, Nirmal Roy
3.	"Akhiyaan Kiya Bole Ratiyaan"	Aashir Wajahat

== Release ==
The film teaser was released on 14 November 2021, and the film trailer was launched with the soundtrack on 26 February 2022 at an event in Karachi. The film was released on Eid al-Fitr, 3 May 2022, under a PG13 rating. It had a world television premiere on Eid al-Adha, 10 July 2022, on Har Pal Geo.

=== Home media ===
The film started digitally streaming on Tamasha from 10 July 2022.

== Accolades ==
Year	Awards	Category	Recipient/ nominee	Result	Ref.
October 6, 2023	Lux Style Awards	Best Film Director	Wajahat Rauf	Nominated	
October 6, 2023	Lux Style Awards	Best Film Actress	Hania Aamir	Nominated	
October 6, 2023	Lux Style Awards	Best Film Song	"Peela Rung"	Won	
