= London Nahi Jaunga =

2022 Pakistani film by Nadeem Baig

- Theatrical Poster
- Urdu: لندن نہیں جاؤں گا
- Directed by: Nadeem Baig
- Written by: Khalil-ur-Rehman Qamar
- Produced by: Humayun Saeed
- Starring: Humayun Saeed; Mehwish Hayat; Kubra Khan
- Edited by: Rizwan AQ
- Production company: Six Sigma Plus
- Distributed by: ARY Films
- Release dates: 7 July 2022 (Middle East); 8 July 2022 (Worldwide); 10 July 2022 (Pakistan)
- Running time: 156 minutes
- Country: Pakistan
- Languages: Urdu; Punjabi
- Box office: Rs. 55 crore (US$2.0 million)

London Nahi Jaunga (transl. I will not go to London) is a 2022 Pakistani Urdu and Punjabi-language romantic comedy film, directed by Nadeem Baig, produced by Humayun Saeed under the banner of Six Sigma Plus, and written by Khalil-ur-Rehman Qamar. It is a spin-off of the 2017 film Punjab Nahi Jaungi (lit. 'I won't go to Punjab'). It stars Huamayun Saeed and Mehwish Hayat alongside Sohail Ahmed, Kubra Khan, Asif Raza Mir and Saba Faisal in supporting roles.

The film was released theatrically on 10 July 2022 on the occasion of Eid al-Adha and received mixed reviews from critics.

== Plot ==
Choudhary Jameel Qamar (Humayun Saeed) is a man who is not into Pakistani things since he was born on Good Friday. His family includes his father Choudhary Sahab (Sohail Ahmad), his mother Chaudrani (Saba Faisal), his aunt (Iffat Rahim), his uncle Haqnawaz Tiwana (Asif Raza Mir), and his cousin Aarzoo (Kubra Khan). At Jameel and Aarzoo's engagement, a woman named Zara (Mehwish Hayat) arrives and says she wants to buy their mansion. Jameel starts to fall in love with her, so he tells his parents to go ask for her hand in marriage since he doesn't like Aarzoo.

Zara finds out that Haqnawaz Tiwana murdered his sister Sara Tiwana (Saba Hameed) because she ran away with a boy she liked. But, Zara then reveals that Sara Tiwana is still alive in London and that she is Sara Tiwana's daughter, to which Haqnawaz doesn't believe. When Choudhary Sahab and Chaudhrani find out about this, Jameel is forced to make an oath that he won't go to London. But when Zara goes back to London, Jameel and his friend Bhatti (Gohar Rasheed) follow her, anyways. So, Sara decides to get Zara married to her friend Harry (Vasay Choudhary) in order to avoid Jameel.

But, Choudhary Sahab and Chaudhrani arrive in London and they, alongside Jameel and Bhatti, go to Zara and Harry's wedding, but she tells Jameel to go away, which leaves him heartbroken. Choudhary Sahab goes to Sara's house to try and reconcile but she pushes him away. Jameel and Bhatti come back to Pakistan, when they see Harry over here. They wonder what's going on, and when Jameel gets home, Chaudhrani reveals that Harry and Zara didn't get married and they both came to Pakistan.

When Harry arrives to the mansion, he meets Aarzoo and they have a fun time together, which implies that they might get married. Jameel finds Zara in the house too and she confesses her love for Jameel, which is followed by a hug. The two then smile and agree to be with one another.

== Cast ==
- Humayun Saeed as Choudhary Jameel Qamar
- Mehwish Hayat as Zara Mansoor Tiwana
- Sohail Ahmad as Choudhary Kafil Qamar; Jameel's father
- Saba Faisal as Chaudrani; Jameel's mother
- Kubra Khan as Arzoo Mansoor Tiwana
- Asif Raza Mir as Haqnawaz Tiwana
- Saba Hameed as Sara Mansoor Tiwana; Zara's mother
- Vasay Choudhary as Harry
- Gohar Rasheed as Bhatti
- Iffat Rahim as Zohra Nawaz; Haqnawaz's wife
- Mehar Bano as Arzoo's friend

== Release ==
The film's official trailer was released on 11 June 2022. The film was released on 7 July 2022 in UAE, and had a worldwide release on 8 July 2022. The film was released in Pakistan on 10 July 2022, coinciding with Eid-ul-Adha.

=== Home media ===
The film started digitally streaming on Tamasha from 14 October 2022.

== Reception ==
=== Box office ===
The Pakistani film 'London Nahi Jaunga' has earned a whopping PKR 53.58 Crores in its worldwide box office collection. The movie garnered an impressive $850,236 (PKR 24.1 Crores) from overseas markets, while the domestic collections stand at PKR 29.48 Crores.

=== Accolades ===
Year	Awards	Category	Nominee	Result	Ref(s).
2023	Lux Style Awards	Best Actor Female Film	Kubra Khan	Nominated	
2023	Lux Style Awards	Best Actor Male Film	Humayun Saeed	Nominated	
2023	Lux Style Awards	Best Film Playback Song	"Mahiya Ve Mahiya"	Nominated	
2023	Lux Style Awards	Best Film	London Nahi Jaunga	Nominated	
2023	IPPA Awards	Best Actor Female Film	Mehwish Hayat	Won	
2023	IPPA Awards	Best Actor Male Film	Humayun Saeed	Won	
2023	IPPA Awards	Best Film	London Nahi Jaunga	Won	
2023	IPPA Awards	Best Director Film	Nadeem Baig	Nominated	
2023	IPPA Awards	Best Supporting Actor Film	Gohar Rasheed	Nominated	
2023	IPPA Awards	Best Supporting Actor Film	Sohail Ahmed	Won	

== See also ==
- List of Pakistani films of 2022
- List of 2022 box office number-one films in Pakistan
- Punjab Nahi Jaungi
