= Ghabrana Nahi Hai =

2022 Pakistani film by Saqib Khan

- Theatrical poster
- Urdu: گھبرانا نہیں ہے
- Directed by: Saqib Khan
- Written by: Hassan Zia; Mohsin Khan
- Screenplay by: Hassan Zia Mohsin Khan Saqib Khan
- Story by: Hassan Zia
- Produced by: Hassan Zia and Jamil Baig
- Starring: Saba Qamar; Zahid Ahmed
- Cinematography: Arshad Khan
- Edited by: Hunain Shamim
- Music by: Shuja Haider; Sohail Keys (score)
- Production companies: Mastermind Production; JB Films
- Distributed by: Geo Films
- Release date: 3 May 2022 (Eid al-Fitr)
- Running time: 158 minutes
- Country: Pakistan
- Language: Urdu
- Box office: Rs. 166.5 million (US$600,000)

Ghabrana Nahi Hai (English: You shouldn't worry) is a 2022 Pakistani action comedy film directed by Saqib Khan, who also co-wrote the script with Mohsin Ali. Produced by Jamil Baig under JB Films and Hassan Zia under Mastermind Production, it stars Saba Qamar and Zahid Ahmed. It was released on Eid al-Fitr, 3 May 2022, by Geo Films.

== Premise ==
Being an only child to her father, Zubeda was raised more like a son to be an empowered woman. She wants justice for her father, and seeks help from officer Sikandar. However, she gets trapped in a love triangle with him and her cousin.

== Cast ==
=== Lead ===
- Saba Qamar as Zubeda Sajjad
- Zahid Ahmed as Sikandar, a cop

=== Recurring ===
- Nayyar Ejaz as Bhai Miyan (Antagonist)
- Syed Jibran as Vicky, Zubeda's cousin
- Afzal Khan as Aslam
- Saleem Meraj as Rizwan
- Gul-e-Rana as Gul-e-Rana
- Dodi Khan as Raza
- Shazeal Shoukat as Secretary
- Tayyab Mahmood Sheikh as Police Constable (Right)
- Sohail Ahmed as Chodhri Sajjad

Additionally, YouTuber Junaid Akram and news reporter Amin Hafeez also appear in the film.

== Production ==
In September 2019, it was announced that Mohsin Khan and Saqib Khan would be making a film. Soon, Jamil Baig and Hassan Zia signed in as producers. The film was announced in January 2020 under the title Zubeda Mard Ban; however it was changed to Ghabrana Nahi Hai in February. As the cast was finalized, the filming was set to begin in March 2020; however, after only two days, it was paused due to the COVID-19 pandemic in Pakistan.

After the lockdown restrictions lifted, 90% principal photography took place in Malir District, Karachi, from November 2020 onward. Then filming took place respectively in Lahore and Faisalabad in January 2021, before wrap-up in February 2021; followed by post-production.

Arshad Khan served as cinematographer, and Hunain Shamim as editor; the cast and crew included 17 debutants, as the producers wanted to put forward fresh talent. The film's title is derived from the famous dialogue of Imran Khan, 22nd Prime Minister of Pakistan, though not in a sarcastic way but for a positive message.

== Soundtrack ==
Ghabrana Nahi Hai

Soundtrack album by Shuja Haider
- Released: 7 May 2022
- Recorded: 2019–21
- Length: 17:31
- Language: Urdu; Punjabi
- Label: Geo; JB; Mastermind
External audio
- Jukebox on YouTube

All tracks are written by Shuja Haider, otherwise noted. The soundtrack was released on 7 May 2022.

No.	Title	Singer(s)	Length
1.	"Tere Ishq"	Raheem Shah	2:40
2.	"Sohneya Ve"	Shuja Haider, Nirmal Roy	3:23
3.	"Dard"	Javed Bashir	4:14
4.	"Ghabrana Nahi Hai" (Title track)	Ali Zafar	3:01
5.	"Jhanjhariya" (Lyrics: S.K Khalish, Music: Waqar Ali)	Jabar Abbas, Neha Chaudhry, Zoheb Hassan	4:13
Total length:			17:31

== Release ==
The initial intention of the filmmakers was to release the film on Eid al-Adha in August 2020, however, it couldn't happen. The film teaser was released on 17 December 2021, and the film trailer on 12 March 2022. The film was released on Eid al-Fitr, 3 May 2022.

== See also ==
- List of Pakistani films of 2022
