= Geo Films =

Pakistani film distribution company

- Logo used as of 2015
- Industry: Film distribution
- Founded: 2007; 19 years ago
- Headquarters: Karachi, Sindh, Pakistan
- Products: Film
- Owner: Abdullah Kadwani; Asad Qureshi
- Parent: Jang Media Group
- Website: geofilms.tv

Geo Films is a film production and distribution company owned by Geo Television Network based in Karachi, Pakistan. Geo Films distributes international and Pakistani films in cinemas across Pakistan.

== Films distributed ==
=== Foreign films ===
The following is the complete list of films distributed by Geo Films in Pakistan:

Year	Title
2008	Kismat Konnection
2010	Virsa
2012	London, Paris, New York
2013	The Hobbit: An Unexpected Journey
2013	Race 2
2013	Man of Steel
2013	Epic
2013	Pacific Rim
2013	Satyagraha
2013	The Wolverine in 3D
2014	Gunday
2014	Total Siyapaa
2014	Jinn
2014	X-Men: Days of Future Past
2014	How to Train Your Dragon 2
2014	Dawn of the Planet of the Apes
2014	Into the Storm
2014	Daawat-e-Ishq
2014	Annabelle
2014	The Judge
2014	Happy New Year
2014	Kill Dil
2014	Horrible Bosses 2
2014	The Hobbit: The Battle of the Five Armies
2015	Welcome to London
2015	Paddington
2015	Jupiter Ascending
2015	Focus
2015	Run All Night
2015	Detective Byomkesh Bakshy!
2015	Sholay
2015	Piku
2015	Mad Max: Fury Road
2015	San Andreas
2015	The Gallows
2015	The Man from U.N.C.L.E.
2015	The 33
2015	Creed
2015	In the Heart of the Sea
2016	Fan
2016	1920 London
2016	Sultan
2017	The Black Prince
2017	Meri Pyaari Bindu
2018	Hichki

=== Pakistani films ===
- 2000s
- 2010s
- 2020s

Year	Title
2007	Mohabbataan Sachiyaan
2007	Khuda Kay Liye
2008	Ramchand Pakistani
2011	Bol
2013	Abhi To Main Jawan Hoon
2013	Anjuman
2013	Armaan
2013	Dil Mera Dhadkan Teri
2013	Devar Bhabhi
2013	Aina
2013	Chambaili
2014	Dukhtar
2015	Moor
2015	Manto
2016	Zindagi Kitni Haseen Hay
2017	Saawan
2018	Wajood
2018	Teefa in Trouble
2018	Load Wedding
2018	The Donkey King
2019	Laal Kabootar
2019	Wrong No. 2
2019	Heer Maan Ja
2019	Sirf Tum Hi To Ho
2022	Ishrat Made in China
2022	Ghabrana Nahi Hai
2022	Parde Mein Rehne Do
2022	The Legend of Maula Jatt
2024	The Glassworker
2025	Deemak
2026	Bullah
2026	Zombeid

== See also ==
- List of film distributors in Pakistan
