= The Legend of Maula Jatt =

2022 Pakistani film by Bilal Lashari

- Theatrical release poster
- Directed by: Bilal Lashari
- Written by: Nasir Adeeb; Bilal Lashari
- Produced by: Ammara Hikmat; Asad Jamil Khan
- Starring: Fawad Khan; Hamza Ali Abbasi; Humaima Malik; Faris Shafi; Mahira Khan
- Cinematography: Bilal Lashari
- Edited by: Bilal Lashari
- Music by: Sarmad Ghafoor
- Production companies: Encyclomedia; Lashari Films
- Distributed by: AAA Motion Pictures; Geo Films; Mandviwala Entertainment
- Release dates: 12 October 2022 (Lahore); 13 October 2022 (Pakistan)
- Running time: 153 minutes
- Country: Pakistan
- Language: Punjabi
- Budget: $4.6 million
- Box office: est. Rs. 400 crore

The Legend of Maula Jatt is a 2022 Pakistani Punjabi-language action drama film directed by Bilal Lashari, who co-wrote it with Nasir Adeeb. Based on characters created by Adeeb for the 1979 film Maula Jatt, it stars Fawad Khan as Maula Jatt, alongside Hamza Ali Abbasi, Humaima Malik, Faris Shafi and Mahira Khan. The film follows Maula Jatt, a local folk hero who confronts Noori Natt, the leader of a rival clan.

Lashari announced a new Maula Jatt film in 2013 and developed it as an adaptation rather than a direct remake. Ammara Hikmat and Asad Jamil Khan produced the film. Production began in January 2017, and principal photography concluded in June 2019. Its release was delayed by a copyright dispute with Muhammad Sarwar Bhatti, the producer of the 1979 film, and later by the COVID-19 pandemic. With a reported budget of $4.6 million, it was described as Pakistan's most expensive film production at the time.

The Legend of Maula Jatt premiered in Lahore on 12 October 2022 and was released theatrically the following day. The film later opened in China in May 2026. It became the highest-grossing Pakistani film and the highest-grossing Punjabi-language film worldwide, with reported earnings of over Rs. 400 crore by August 2023. Reviewers praised the film's scale, direction and action sequences, while criticism focused on its pacing, story structure and some performances.

== Plot ==
Set in a fictionalised version of Punjab in an unspecified period, the film opens with Jeeva Natt's clan attacking the haveli (mansion) of rival clan leader Sardar Jatt. They overpower and kill Jatt and his wife. Maula, Jatt's son and the sole survivor of the attack, is raised by a woman named Daani. One day, Daani's son Mooda takes Maula to his wrestling coach, who is impressed by Maula and agrees to train him. Maula grows up to become a famous wrestler, but at night he struggles with violent dreams of his past and has no clear memory of his family.

Maakha Natt, one of Jeeva's sons, terrorises Maula's village by kidnapping a girl and raping her in his haveli. Due to his old age, Jeeva decides to name another member of his clan as leader; however, his daughter Daaro declares that only Noori Natt, Jeeva's elder son, should rule the clan. Noori is imprisoned because of his obsession with murder. Before a fight, Maula is approached by an old man who tells him that he has the answer to every question Maula has. He tells Maula to meet him in the ruins of Sardar Jatt's haveli. That night, Maula fights while heavily intoxicated and loses for the first time in his life, but Mooda saves him and is badly injured in the process. The next day, Maula arrives at the ruins, where the old man reveals that Maula is the son of Sardar Jatt. He then gives Maula his father's "gandasa", a long-handled axe-like weapon. Maula returns to his village and finds men of the Natt clan terrorising the villagers again. In a rage, he kills them. When Maakha comes to investigate, Maula defeats and humiliates him.

Maakha returns home to plot his revenge, but Daaro is enraged by his humiliation. She berates him and moves to kill him, but before she can do so, Maakha jumps from a ledge and dies. The Natt clan seeks to avenge the humiliation Maula has caused them. Meanwhile, Maula tries to convince the villagers to stand up against the cruelty they face, while the villagers accuse him of bringing the Natt clan's wrath upon them. Noori is released from prison and tells the jailor that he has run out of competition and wants a worthy opponent. He soon learns of Maula, who has become known for his fighting ability. At the villagers' request, Maula agrees to go to the Natt haveli and apologise for humiliating Maakha, hoping this will spare the village from further violence. However, after he leaves the village, Noori arrives in search of him. Mooda, unaware of Noori's identity, claims responsibility for humiliating Maakha. Noori defeats Mooda in combat and kills him despite Daani's pleas. Maula returns and finds Mooda dead, then swears to kill Noori.

Maula goes to the Natt haveli to challenge Noori but is ambushed and captured by Jeeva. Noori accuses his father of taking away his competition and kills him. He then declares Daaro the leader of the clan, but she is betrayed and killed by her own clan, who frame Maula for her death. When Noori learns of his sister's death, he burns Maula's village and captures the villagers. Maula returns to the village and fights Noori. In the final fight, Maula kills Noori and is hailed as the village's hero.

== Cast ==
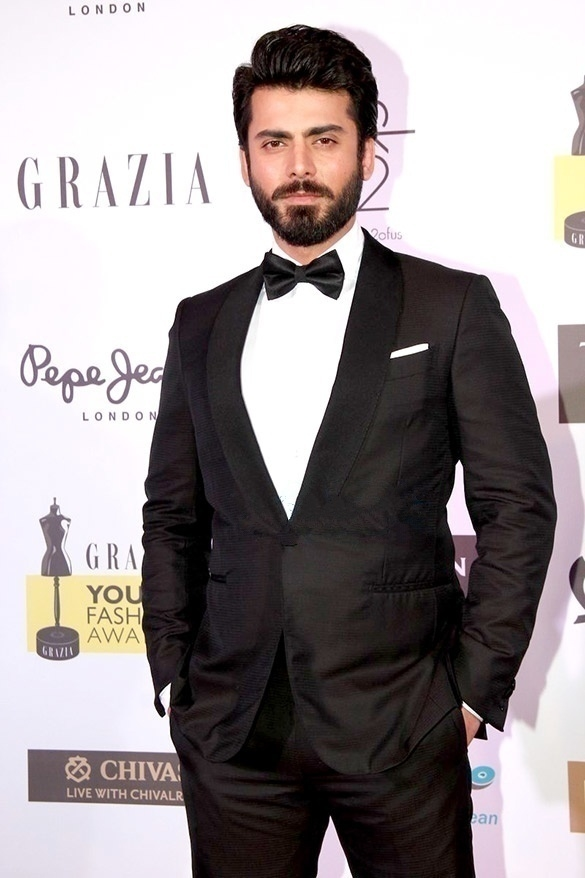
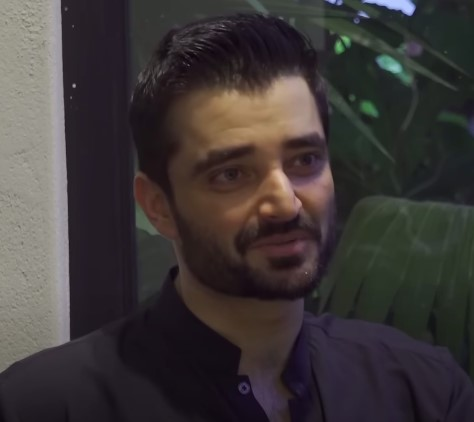
Fawad Khan and Hamza Ali Abbasi portray Maula Jatt and Noori Natt, respectively.

The cast includes:

- Fawad Khan as Maula Jatt
- Rehan Fareed Hiraj as young Maula
- Hamza Ali Abbasi as Noori Natt
- Mahira Khan as Mukhoo Jattni
- Humaima Malik as Daaro Nattni
- Gohar Rasheed as Maakha Natt
- Faris Shafi as Mooda
- Shafqat Cheema as Jeeva Natt
- Saima Baloch as Rajjo
- Nayyer Ejaz as Jagoo Natt
- Ali Azmat as Gogi
- Babar Ali as Sardar Jatt, Maula's father
- Resham as Malika Jatt, Maula's mother
- Zia Khan as Ali, a loyalist of Sardar Jatt
- Kamran Lashari as the narrator
- Raheela Agha as Daani, Mooda's mother and Maula Jatt's foster mother
- Muhammad Ali Raza as Jagoo's guard

== Production ==
=== Development ===
After the release of his action thriller film Waar in 2013, Bilal Lashari announced that his next project would be a new version of Maula Jatt, the 1979 Punjabi action film. He described the project as a multi-million-dollar attempt to revisit the Punjabi gandasa film tradition, a style of rural action cinema associated with the long-handled axe-like gandasa, and to pay homage to Maula Jatt. Lashari later said that the idea came to him while making Waar, though he began work on the adaptation about a year later. Ammara Hikmat and Asad Jamil Khan produced the film under Lashari Films and Encyclomedia.

The project began as Lashari's attempt to reinterpret the Punjabi gandasa genre. He said a direct remake would not have been enough because he thought the 1979 film and the genre needed to be reworked for contemporary audiences. He first wrote the screenplay in English before turning to Punjabi dialogue, and brought in Nasir Adeeb, the writer of the 1979 film, to write the dialogue for the new film. In October 2014, Lashari said the film was legally covered and would soon enter production, and confirmed that Adeeb was part of the team. According to the producers, the film was neither a remake nor a sequel of the original Maula Jatt, but an adaptation based on its characters.

Lashari said the new film retained the original story's core elements but changed its characters, setting, era and tone. He described the setting as a realistic fantasy version of Punjab, without firearms or electricity. Al Jazeera described the setting as an unknown time in a fantasy world that Lashari called "Parallel Punjab". Lashari developed sketches for characters and scenes and expanded the rivalry between Maula Jatt and Noori Natt. He rewrote the screenplay 80 times. The project cost a reported $4.6 million, making it Pakistan's most expensive film at the time of release.

=== Casting and preparation ===
In 2015, fitness trainer Hassaan Mehmood said that he was training Hamza Ali Abbasi for the film, focusing on muscle symmetry, proportion, endurance and cardiovascular health. In January 2016, Fawad Khan was cast as Maula Jatt opposite Abbasi as Noori Natt. Lashari said that Fawad Khan's casting was intended to present a different side of the actor, while Abbasi was chosen for Noori Natt because of his voice, dialogue delivery and fluency in Punjabi. The principal cast also included Mahira Khan as Mukhoo Jattni, Humaima Malik as Daaro Nattni, Gohar Rasheed as Maakha Natt, Faris Shafi as Mooda and Shafqat Cheema as Jeeva Natt.

Before filming, a team of action choreographers from Los Angeles conducted workshops in Lahore for the cast and crew. Fawad Khan and Abbasi trained physically for their roles; the initial phase of training focused on Abbasi's portrayal of Noori Natt.

=== Filming and design ===
The film began production in January 2017, and principal photography concluded in June 2019. The film was mostly filmed outdoors, with only a few sets made in studios, and bad weather contributed to production delays. The film's visual design included large sets, detailed costumes and character-specific accessories. Lashari said the design team researched sets and costumes with reference to 16th-century Punjab.

Lashari also served as the film's cinematographer and editor. The production involved technicians and visual-effects artists from several countries, and a large set was built in Bedian, on the outskirts of Lahore.

== Release and copyright dispute ==
The film's trailer was released on 21 December 2018. At that time, the film was scheduled for theatrical release on Eid al-Fitr 2019, with a simultaneous release in China also announced.

The release was postponed amid a copyright dispute with Muhammad Sarwar Bhatti, the producer of the 1979 film Maula Jatt. Bhatti, through Bahoo Films, filed a suit before the Intellectual Property Organization of Pakistan tribunal in 2017 seeking an injunctive order against the film's exhibition. In 2019, he also sought stay orders in the Lahore High Court to prevent the filmmakers from using material that he claimed violated his intellectual property. Producer Ammara Hikmat denied the claims and said that Nasir Adeeb, the writer of the 1979 film, had transferred the rights to characters including Maula Jatt and Noori Natt to Lashari and Hikmat.

On 9 February 2020, a settlement was reached between the two parties. Bhatti was recognised as the copyright and trademark owner of the 1979 film, but gave the filmmakers permission to use content from the original work and agreed to withdraw his petitions regarding the film's release. The agreement applied to the production, release, promotion and distribution of The Legend of Maula Jatt, but not to future films that might violate rights retained by Bahoo Films.

After the settlement, the film was again scheduled for release on Eid al-Fitr 2020, but it was postponed due to the COVID-19 pandemic and the closure of cinemas in Pakistan. After multiple delays, Lashari announced that the film would be released on 13 October 2022. The film premiered in Lahore on 12 October 2022 and opened theatrically the following day in Pakistan and other territories. Its theatrical run later reached more than 500 screens worldwide.

The film was planned for release in India in 2022, but the release was delayed indefinitely. It was later planned for a limited release in Punjab, India, on 2 October 2024, but the Indian Ministry of Information and Broadcasting denied Zee Studios, the film's distributor in India, permission to release it. The release would have made it the first Pakistani film to be screened in India in more than a decade.

In May 2026, Lashari announced that The Legend of Maula Jatt would be released in cinemas across China on 21 May. He said the film had entered China's quota-based system for importing foreign films for theatrical release, and described it as the first Pakistani film to do so. The film premiered in Beijing on 19 May 2026, ahead of its theatrical release in China on 21 May.

== Reception ==
=== Box office ===
The Legend of Maula Jatt opened worldwide on more than 500 screens across 25 countries. In its opening weekend, it grossed Rs. 50.91 crore worldwide, including Rs. 11.27 crore in Pakistan. The worldwide opening was the highest for a Pakistani film, nearly double the previous record held by Jawani Phir Nahi Ani 2.

By late October 2022, the film had grossed Rs. 115 crore worldwide, becoming the highest-grossing Pakistani film worldwide. By 13 December 2022, it had grossed Rs. 115.02 crore in Pakistan and Rs. 160.8 crore outside Pakistan, for a worldwide total of Rs. 274.7 crore. Box Office Mojo later listed the film's worldwide gross as US$13.94 million, including US$5 million in Pakistan and US$8.9 million from other territories. By August 2023, the film had crossed Rs. 400 crore worldwide.

Outside Pakistan, the film earned £315,000 in the United Kingdom during its opening weekend, entering the UK box office chart at number nine, and grossed more than $515,000 in the United Arab Emirates, where it reached number one. In Canada, it grossed CA$324,000 and ranked sixth, while its combined collections in the United States and Canada exceeded $600,000. By its fifth weekend, the film had grossed almost £1.3 million in the United Kingdom, becoming the highest-grossing film from the Indian subcontinent at the UK box office in four years.

The film became the highest-grossing Pakistani film and the highest-grossing Punjabi-language film worldwide.

=== Critical response ===
On the review aggregator website Rotten Tomatoes, 80% of 5 critics' reviews are positive, with an average rating of 6.5/10.

Cath Clarke of The Guardian gave the film 3 out of 5 stars, comparing its style to Game of Thrones and Gladiator and describing it as an old-fashioned but entertaining action film. Namrata Joshi of Screen Daily wrote that, despite its length and extended finale, the film remained "steadily absorbing and entertaining". Shubhra Gupta of The Indian Express rated the film 3.5 out of 5 stars and wrote that it revived an older good-versus-evil melodramatic style while using contemporary fantasy-action imagery.

Rafay Mahmood and Zeeshan Ahmad of The Express Tribune rated the film 4 out of 5 stars, praising the scale of its production and action sequences while discussing its use of characters and plot elements from the original film. Stephanie Bunbury of Deadline Hollywood described the film as entertaining, while criticising it for lacking complexity. Syed Zain Raza of The Friday Times praised Humaima Malik's performance as Daaro Nattni, calling it one of the film's strongest elements, and also responded positively to Abbasi's portrayal of Noori Natt.

Some criticism focused on the film's acting, pacing and story structure. Carla Hay of Culture Mix gave a negative review, criticising the performances and describing the story as formulaic, while noting that the film's production design, costumes, action sequences and visual effects reflected its large budget. Some Pakistani reviewers criticised Mahira Khan's performance and Punjabi accent. Raza wrote that Mukhoo Jattni was not a suitable role for her, while reviewer for Dawn Images said that her Punjabi accent needed more work or "bordered on mimicry", and that her delivery weakened the character.

=== Accolades ===
Ceremony	Category	Recipient	Result	Ref.
7th Jackie Chan International Action Film Week	Special Jury Award	The Legend of Maula Jatt	Won	
7th Jackie Chan International Action Film Week	Best Art Direction	Namsa Abbasi & Hamza Bajwa	Won	
Taurus World Stunt Awards	Best Fight	The Legend of Maula Jatt	Nominated	

== See also ==
- List of Pakistani films of 2022
- List of highest-grossing Punjabi films
- List of highest-grossing films in Pakistan
- List of highest-grossing Pakistani films
- List of 2022 box office number-one films in Pakistan
- List of Pakistani Punjabi-language films
