= List of Pakistani actresses =

This is an alphabetical list of notable Pakistani film and television actresses.

== A ==
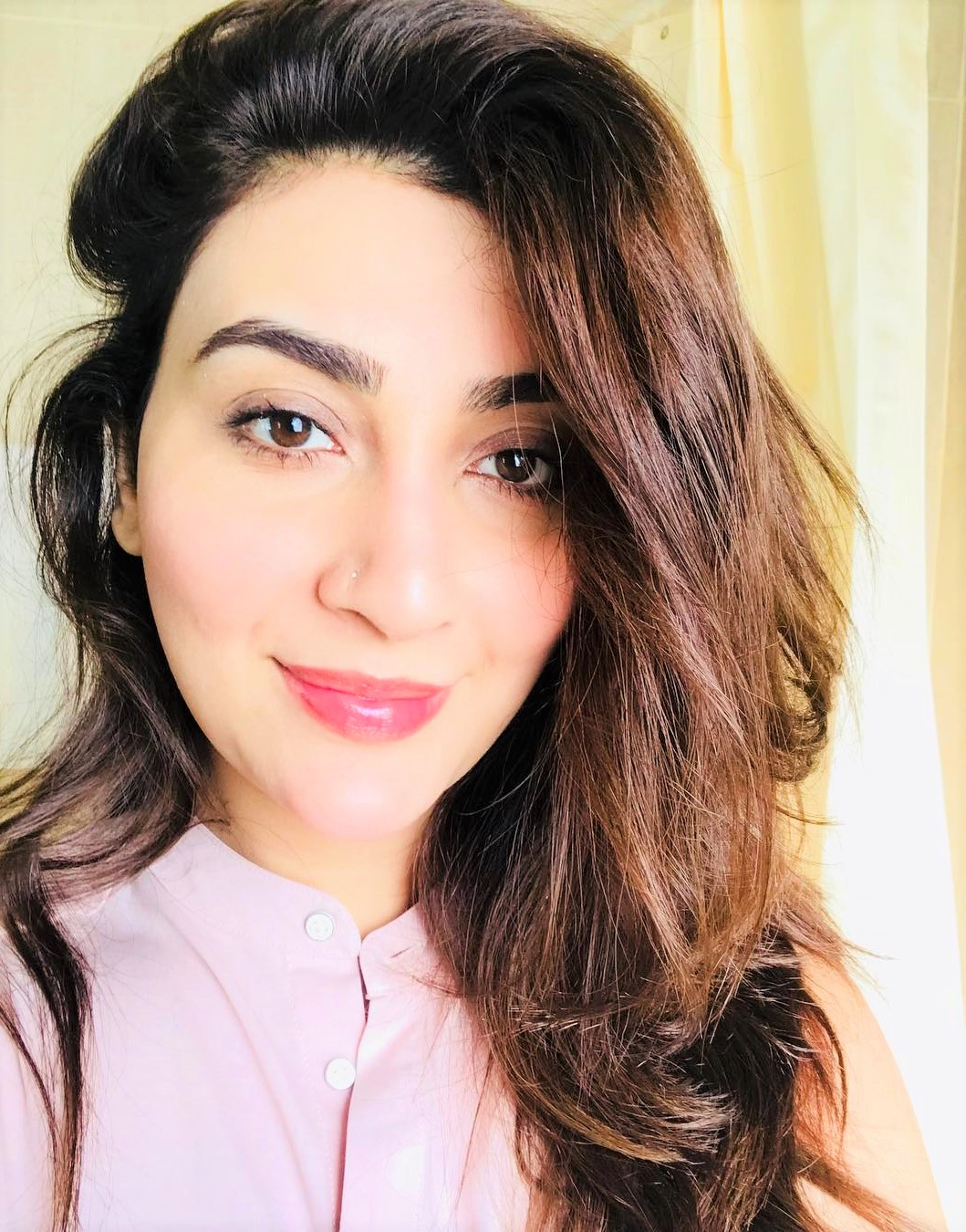
Aisha Uqbah Malik (2018)

- Aasia
- Armeena Khan
- Aaminah Haq
- Aamina Sheikh
- Aiman Khan
- Ainy Jaffri
- Alishba Yousuf
- Alizeh Shah
- Amar Khan
- Angeline Malik
- Anjuman
- Anjuman Shehzadi
- Anum Fayyaz
- Anoushey Ashraf
- Anoushey Abbasi
- Arjumand Rahim
- Arisha Razi
- Asma Abbas
- Asha Posley
- Atiqa Odho
- Ayesha Khan
- Ayesha Omar
- Ayesha Sana
- Ayeza Khan
- Azra Sherwani
- Arij Fatyma
- Anmol Baloch

== B ==
- Babra Sharif
- Badar Khalil
- Bahar Begum
- Begum Khurshid Mirza
- Bushra Ansari
- Bushra Farrukh

== D ==
- Dananeer Mobeen
- Deeba
- Deedar
- Durefishan Saleem

== F ==
- Farah Shah
- Fatima Effendi Kanwar
- Fazila Qazi
- Faiza Gilani

== G ==
- Ghana Ali
- Gori
- Gul-e-Rana (actress)

== H ==
- Hajra Yamin
- Hareem Farooq
- Hiba Bukhari
- Hina Dilpazeer
- Hina Shaheen
- Humaima Malik
- Husna
- Hania Amir
- Hina Afridi
- Hina Altaf
- Hira Mani

== I ==
- Iffat Rahim
- Iman Ali
- Ismat Zaidi
- Iqra Aziz

== J ==
- Jana Malik
- Javeria Abbasi
- Javeria Saud
- Juggan Kazim

== K ==
- Kaveeta
- Khalida Riyasat
- Khushboo
- Kinza Hashmi
- Komal Meer
- Komal Rizvi
- Kubra Khan

== L ==
* Laiba Khan
- Laila Zuberi

== M ==
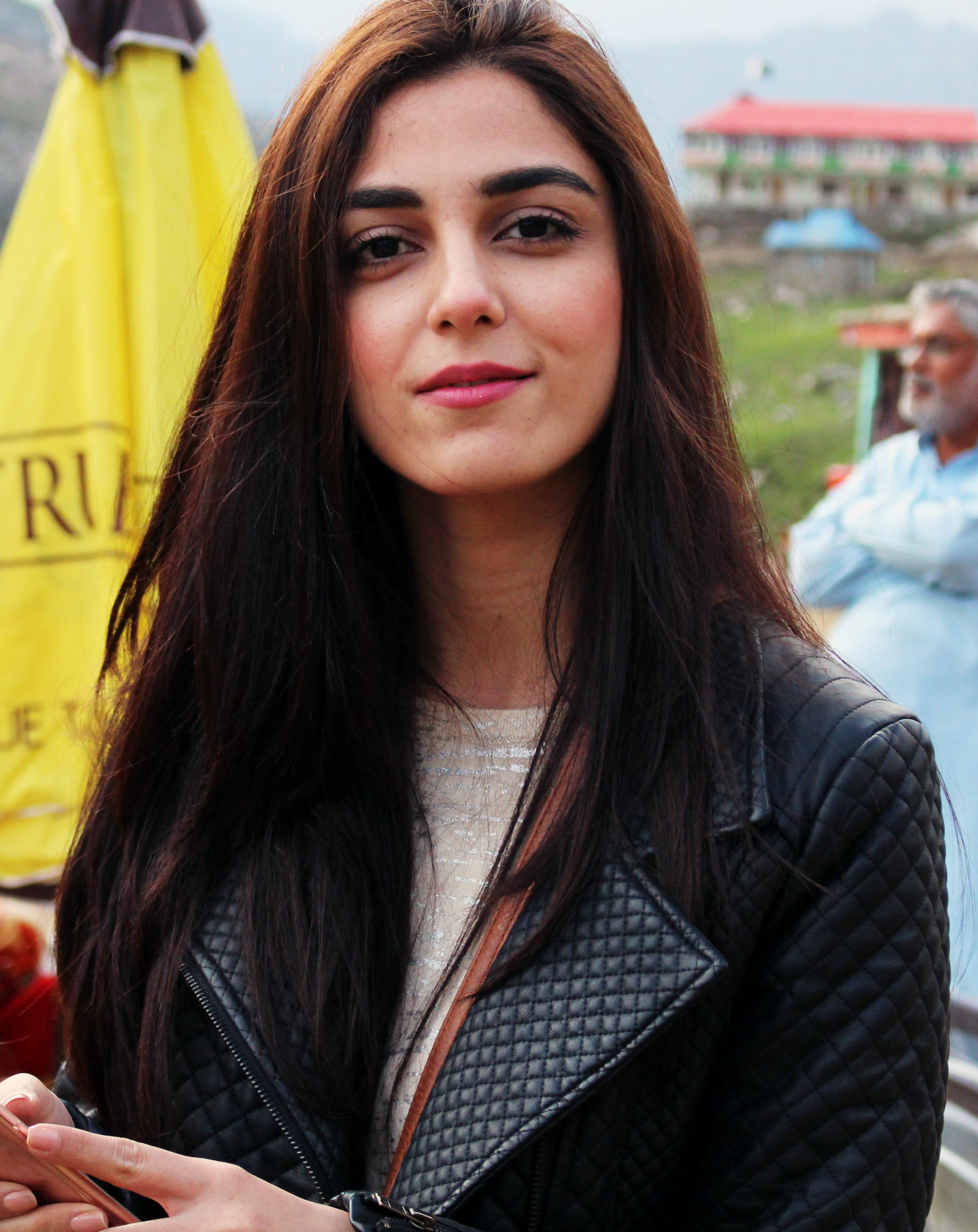
Maya Ali (2010s)

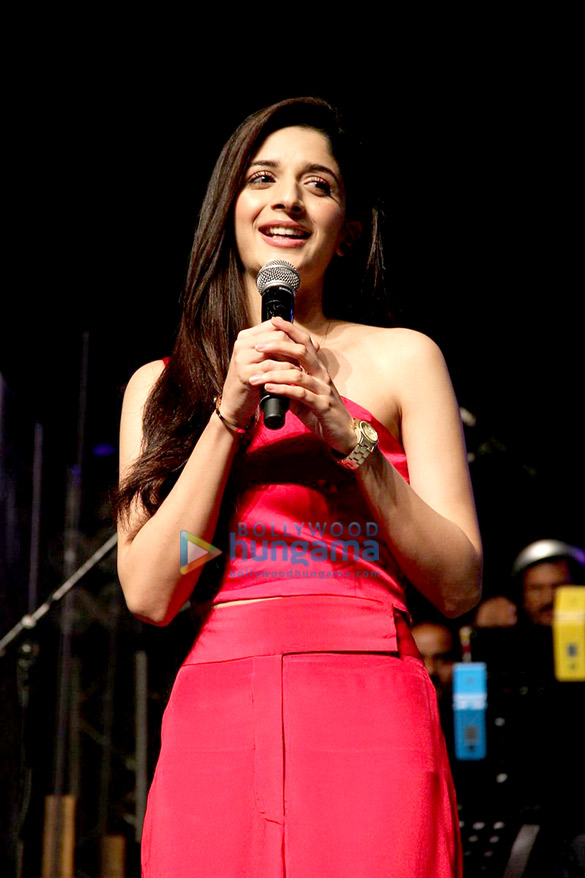
Mawra Hocane (2016)

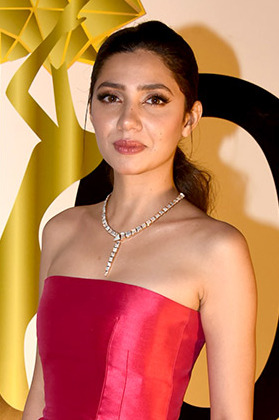
Mahira Khan (2018)

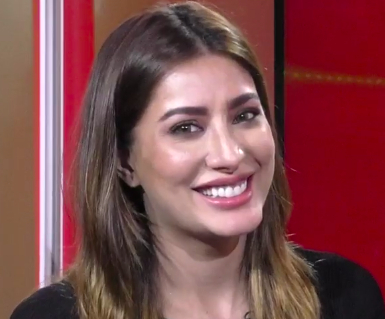
Mehwish Hayat (2019)

- Madeeha Gauhar
- Madiha Iftikhar
- Madiha Imam
- Madiha Shah
- Maham Amir
- Mahira Khan
- Maheen Rizvi
- Mahnoor
- Mahnoor Baloch
- Maira Khan
- Mansha Pasha
- Maria Wasti
- Mariam Ansari
- Marina Khan
- Mariyam Khalif
- Maryam Fatima
- Maryam Nafees
- Mathira
- Mawra Hocane
- Maya Ali
- Meera
- Meesha Shafi
- Mehr Hassan
- Mehreen Raheel
- Mehwish Hayat
- Mishi Khan
- Mizna Waqas
- Meher Bano
- Mira Sethi
- Momal Sheikh
- Musarrat Nazir
- Musarrat Shaheen

== N ==
- Nadira
- Nadia Afghan
- Nadia Hussain
- Nadia Khan
- Nadia Jamil
- Naheed Shabbir
- Nargis
- Naveen Tajik
- Naveen Waqar
- Nayyar Sultana
- Neelam Muneer
- Neeli
- Neelo
- Nida Yasir
- Nimra Bucha
- Nirma
- Noor Bukhari
- Noor Jehan

== Q ==
- Qandeel Baloch

== R ==
- Rabia Butt
- Ramsha Khan
- Rani
- Reema Khan
- Resham
- Rozina
- Rubina Ashraf
- Rubya Chaudhry

== S ==
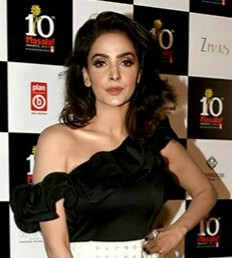
Saba Qamar (2017)

- Sajal Ali
- Saba Qamar
- Sabeena Farooq
- Sabeena Syed
- Sabreen Hisbani
- Saba Hameed
- Sabiha Khanum
- Saboor Ali
- Sadia Imam
- Saeeda Imtiaz
- Sahiba Afzal
- Sahar Hashmi
- Saima Noor
- Saira Khan
- Salma Mumtaz
- Salma Agha
- Saloni
- Samina Ahmad
- Samina Peerzada
- Samiya Mumtaz
- Sana Askari
- Sana Javed
- Sana Nawaz
- Saman Ansari
- Sanam Baloch
- Sanam Chaudhry
- Sanam Jung
- Sanam Saeed
- Sangeeta
- Sania Saeed
- Sara Loren
- Sarah Khan
- Sarwat Gilani
- Savera Nadeem
- Sehar Khan
- Shabnam
- Shagufta Ejaz
- Shamim Ara
- Shamim Bano
- Shehnaz Sheikh
- Sitara
- Sobia Khan
- Sohai Ali Abro
- Somy Ali
- Sonia Khan
- Sonia Mishal
- Sonya Hussyn
- Sonya Jehan
- Sumbul Iqbal
- Suzain Fatima
- Swaran Lata
- Syra Yousuf

== T ==
- Tara Mahmood
- Tooba Siddiqui

== U ==
- Ushna Shah
- Urwa Hocane
- Uzra Butt

== V ==
- Vaneeza Ahmad
- Veena Malik

== Y ==
- Yumna Zaidi
- Yashma Gill

== Z ==
- Zainub Qayyum
- Zara Noor Abbas
- Zara Sheikh
- Zeba
- Zeba Ali
- Zeba Bakhtiar
- Zhalay Sarhadi
- Zarnish Khan
- Zoya Nasir
- Zubab Rana

== See also ==
- List of Pakistani male actors
- List of Pakistani models
