= Saiqa =

Saiqa may refer to:

- Al-Saiqa (Libya), Libyan Special Forces
- As-Sa'iqa, a Palestinian Baathist political and military faction
- Saiqa (TV series), a Pakistani television drama series
- Saiqa (film) a 1968 Pakistani Urdu film
- Sa'ka Forces, Egyptian Special Forces
- Saiqa (actress), a Pakistani film actress
