= Saiqa (novel) =

Urda novel by Razia Butt

Saiqa is an Urdu novel by Pakistani author Razia Butt. The novel revolves around an orphan girl who is mistreated in her house and is considered "disgusting" by her relatives. The novel has been adapted into a film and a television series.

== Synopsis ==
The novel is about Saiqa, a young girl who loses her parents in her childhood. She lives and grows up with her uncles, aunts and grandmother who continually humiliate her. She later falls in love and marries her cousin Rehan, who defends and supports her against her treatment.

== Film adaptataions ==
The novel was adapted into the film Saiqa (film) (1972) and television series Saiqa (TV series) (2009).
