= 5th Lux Style Awards =

2006 Pakistani awards ceremony

- Date: 21 February 2006
- Site: Expo Centre, Karachi
- Hosted by: Shaan Shahid

Television coverage
- Channel: ARY Digital

The 5th Lux Style Awards ceremony was held in Expo Center in Karachi, Pakistan. The show was hosted by Shaan Shahid, Meera and from the members of BNN. The show had the performances by Mehreen Raheel, Faisal Qureshi, Ali Zafar, Faisal Rehman, and Mehreen Syed. Some of the film and music categories were removed from the award.

== Winners and nominees ==
=== Films ===
Categories	Winners
Best Film	Koi Tujh Sa Kahan
Best Film Actor	Moammar Rana-Koi Tujh Sa Kahan
Best Film Actress	Reema Khan-Koi Tujh Sa Kahan

=== Television ===
Categories	Winners	Nominations
Best Television Play (PTV)	Sassi	Aadhi Dhoop; Batain Dil Ki; Masuri; Matti
Best Television Director (PTV)	Tariq Mairaj-Aadhi Dhoop	Sajjad Ahmed-Matti; Ataullah Balouch-Matti Ki Moorat; Zeba Bakhtiar-Masuri; M. Usama & Zulfiqar-Sassi
Best Television Actor (PTV)	Noman Ijaz-Sassi	Arbaaz Khan-Sassi; Raja Haider-Aadhi Dhoop; Faisal Rehman-Batain Dil Ki; Faysal Quraishi-Masuri
Best Television Actress (PTV)	Saira Khan-Beti	Shagufta Ejaz-Beti; Sabreen Hisbani-Masuri; Pushpa Narain-Masuri; Robina Naz-Aadhi Dhoop
Best Television Play (Satellite)	Riyasat-ARY Digital	Lahaasil-Hum TV); Mere Paas Paas-Hum TV; Bano Ko Pehchano-Geo TV; Yeh Bhi Kisi Ki Bayti Hai-Geo TV
Best Television Director (Satellite)	Angeline Malik-Lahaasil (Hum TV)	Misbah Khalid-Mere Paas Paas (Hum TV); Ataullah Balouch-Siskiyan (Indus Vision); Kamran Qureshi-Riyasat (ARY Digital); Salman Shahid-Bano Ko Pehchano (Geo TV); Ayub Khawar-Yeh Bhi Kisi Ki Bayti Hai (Geo TV)
Best Television Actor (Satellite)	Talat Hussain-Yeh Bhi Kisi Ki Bayti Hai (Geo TV)	Moammar Rana-Mere Paas Paas (Hum TV); Faysal Quraishi-Jaye Kahan Ye Dil (Geo TV); Salman Shahid-Bano Ko Pehchano (Geo TV); Talat Hussain-Riyasat (ARY Digital)
Best Television Actress (Satellite)	Maria Wasti-Riyasat (ARY Digital)	Nadia Jamil-Mere Paas Paas (Hum TV); Angeline Malik-Lahaasil (Hum TV); Farah Shah-Partition Aik Safar (Geo TV); Iffat Rahim-Bano Ko Pehchano (Geo TV)

=== Music ===
Categories	Winners	Nominations
Best Album of the Year	Social Circus-Ali Azmat	Peeli Patti Aur Raja Jani Ki Gol Dunya-Noori; Burri Baat Hai-Shehzad Roy; Jhuki Jhuki-Sheraz Uppal; Jilawatan-Call
Best Video Director	Saqib Malik-Na Re Na	Ammar Belal-My Favourite Dream; Uns Mufti-Main Hoon Na; Xulfi-Irtiqa; Zeeshan Parwez-Freestyle Diva
Best Live Act	Overlord	Fuzon; Mekaal Hasan Band; Noori; Sajjad Ali
Most Inspirational Devotional Album	Junaid Jamshed-Jalwa-e-Janan	N/A

=== Special ===
==== Chairperson's Lifetime Achievement Award ====
Mehdi Hassan
