= Virsa (film) =

2010 film by Pankaj Batra

- Theatrical release poster
- Directed by: Pankaj Batra
- Written by: Arun Behl; Pankaj Batra
- Produced by: Amanullah Khan; Aman Mahajan; Vikram Kakar
- Starring: Arya Babbar; Mehreen Raheel; Noman Ijaz; Gulshan Grover; Kanwaljit Singh
- Cinematography: R. A. Krishna
- Edited by: Pravin Prabhakaran
- Music by: Jawad Ahmad; Haider Ali Mir
- Distributed by: Wize Mindz Entertainment
- Release dates: 4 April 2010 (Dallas); 5 May 2010 (Lahore); 7 May 2010 (India and Pakistan)
- Countries: India; Pakistan
- Language: Punjabi

Virsa (transl. Heritage) is an Indo-Pakistani Punjabi-language film revolving around social and cultural values. Most of the film's cast and crew were from India. It was directed by Pankaj Batra, with a budget of 40 million rupees.

The film was shot in Australia. The film stars Pakistani actors Noman Ijaz and Mehreen Raheel, Indian actors Gulshan Grover, Arya Babbar, Kanwaljeet Singh, Aparna Sharma, Aishveryaa Nidhi, Pankaj Batra and Australian actor Andrew Duvall.

The music was provided by Jawad Ahmad, who was also one of the producers of the film. He was able to convince the Government of Pakistan's relevant authorities to waive off the 65 percent entertainment tax on this Indo-Pak joint venture film.

== Plot ==
Virsa is the story of Nawaz Ali and Ranvir Singh Grewal and their families. Nawaz Ali hails from Lahore in Pakistan and Ranvir Singh Grewal from Jakopur village in Punjab, India. About 20 years ago, both of them migrated to Sydney, Australia, in search of work, where they met and became best of friends. Gradually, their hard work paid off. Ranvir opened an Indian restaurant, which became a runaway success. Nawaz Ali opened a shop opposite Ranvir's restaurant. It did well and he could manage to lead a comfortable life but he was not as successful as Ranvir.

Nawaz Ali was very grounded in his culture and values and this helped him to remain level-headed and not get carried away by the comforts of life in Australia. He never lost sight of what was morally and ethically right and stood by his Asian values.

On the other hand, Ranvir got carried away by his success. He felt that he was superior to the other Indians and Asians who were not as successful. He found merit in all things associated with the white folks – their lifestyle, their values and culture, their behaviour and mannerisms – and looked down upon his Indian upbringing and values. He had no more use for ethics and morality. He became very conscious of his money, status and reputation.

The difference in outlook and behaviour drives the two friends apart until they reach a point where Ranvir stops talking to Nawaz. However, Nawaz still cares for his friend and tries to keep their friendship alive.

As the film opens, Ranvir and Nawaz are well-settled in Australia with their respective families. Nawaz has one son, Amaan Ali and Ranvir has a son, Yuvraj, and a daughter, Meet. Amaan and Yuvraj are roughly the same age and best buddies since childhood, despite the rift between their fathers. However, the difference in the thinking of the two fathers is reflected in the personalities of their sons. Amaan is a sensible, level-headed young man. He is strongly grounded in and comfortable with his Asian identity. However, he is contemporary in his outlook. He does a fine balance of sticking to his values even as he adapts to the society around him and its mores and traditions.

Yuvraj is the opposite of Amaan. Due to Ranvir's indulgent attitude, Yuvraj grows up wealthy and spoiled. He feels closer to white people than to the Asian community around him. He is unfamiliar with Indian culture and values and shows little regard for ethical or moral principles. He enjoys women, alcohol and drugs.

Yuvraj's sister, Meet, is quite like him in her values, upbringing and behaviour. She is going steady with a white young man but is not sure how her father will react to this development. However, she also has a special relationship with Amaan. Nothing is said but she instinctively feels that she can always depend on his help, that he will always be there for her. Amaan too feels an instinctive pull towards her but waits for the right time to tell her of his love for her.

Ranvir feels that the people in his village look down upon him because they feel that he is not a good son, since his father, Sardar Joginder Singh, lives here all alone. Sardarji wants to stay in Punjab, till his last breath. Ranvir cons Sardarji into going with him. In Australia, however, things are very different. The cost of living is high and labour is expensive. Ranvir enlists Sardarji's help for his restaurant. Gradually, Sardarji's status becomes no more than that of a paid servant.

One night, at a party, Yuvraj meets Mahi. Mahi has come from Punjab to Sydney for her studies. She is a modern-day young Indian woman, contemporary but with a solid foundation in Indian values and culture. She is beautiful, intelligent and confident. As they fall in love, she tries to reform him and for some time, it seems as though he will sort his life out. But old habits die hard. Yuvraj gradually falls back into his old ways and Mahi is unable to stop him.

Will Ranvir ever see Nawaz's point of view and will they ever be friends again? Will Sardarji remain a prisoner to his son's whims or will he rebel against him and return to Punjab? Will Yuvraj ever understand ethics and morality? Will Mahi return to Yuvraj? Will Ranvir accept a white boyfriend for Meet? And Amaan, who loves Meet – will he ever tell her about his love?

As Virsa answers these and other questions, it makes a strong statement about remaining true to one's values, culture and upbringing even as we constantly adapt and adjust to the society around us. It explores ways of addressing the identity conflicts of immigrant Asians in Western societies so that the succeeding generations can benefit from the best facets of both the cultures.

== Cast ==
- Arya Babbar as Yuvraj Singh Grewal, 20, Ranvir Singh's son. Born in India and brought up in Australia, he has had a completely Westernised upbringing.
- Mehreen Raheel as Mahi Sandhu, a young woman from Chandigarh.
- Noman Ijaz as Nawaz Ali, 45, who hails from Lahore, Pakistan. About 20 years ago, he migrated to Sydney, Australia, where he met Ranvir and they became the best of friends.
- Gulshan Grover as Sardar Jogindar Singh, Ranvir Singh's father, a 70-year-old man from a village, Kartarpur, in Punjab. He is a simple, honest, hard-working man with a great bonding with his culture and traditions. He has lived all his life in Punjab and wants to spend his last days there too.
- Kanwaljit Singh as Ranvir Singh Grewal, 45, is a successful restaurant owner in Sydney. He was a simple village boy from Punjab, who came to Australia about 20 years ago and made it big. His success turned his head and he started looking down on his culture and traditions, his people and their values.
- Aman Dhaliwal as Aaman Ali, Nawaz Ali's son. He is also Yuvraj Singh Grewal's best friend. When Yuvraj is in trouble with his love life, Aaman Ali helps him get close to the girl by helping him think from a cultural perspective.

== Soundtrack ==
All music is composed by Jawad Ahmed.

| No. | Title | Singer(s) | Length |
|---|---|---|---|
| 1. | "Yaadan" | Jawad Ahmad | 05:20 |
| 2. | "Yaadan" (Remix) | Jawad Ahmad | 04:51 |
| 3. | "Hua Hua" | Jawad Ahmad | 05:34 |
| 4. | "Hua Hua" (Dhol Mix) | Jawad Ahmad | 04:42 |
| 5. | "Mein Teinu Samjhawan Ki" | Rahat Fateh Ali Khan, Farah Anwar | 04:56 |
| 6. | "Mein Teinu Samjhawan Ki" (Unplugged) | Rahat Fateh Ali Khan, Farah Anwar | 04:59 |
| 7. | "Naina" | Jawad Ahmad, Richa Sharma, Amanda Khan | 05:48 |
| 8. | "Dilbara" | Fuad Ahmad, Farah Anwar, Sahir Ali Bagga | 06:32 |
| 9. | "Vaisakhi" | Krishna Beura | 06:54 |
| 10. | "Vaisakhi" | Jawad Ahmad | 06:54 |
| 11. | "Mein Teinu Samjhawan Ki" | Sahir Ali Bagga | 04:56 |

== Reception ==
Ali Usman of The Express Tribune wrote "Though Virsa made a strong statement about remaining true to one’s values, culture and upbringing even as we constantly adapt and adjust to the society around us, it left many patches unanswered in its storyline. At several occasions, one felt the sequence of the film had gone awry, however the acting of the cast and the soundtrack will help draw in an audience."
