= Mujhay Jeenay Do =

Pakistani television series

- Title screen
- Genre: Drama; Social Issues
- Written by: Shahid Nizami
- Directed by: Angeline Malik
- Starring: Gohar Rasheed; Hania Aamir; Mehreen Raheel; Nadia Jamil
- Opening theme: "Mujhay Jeenay Do"; Vocals Arieb Azhar & Gulshan Jehan
- Composer: Heer Waris Shah
- Country of origin: Pakistan
- Original language: Urdu
- No. of seasons: 1
- No. of episodes: 22

Production
- Producer: Angeline Malik
- Production locations: Rahim Yar Khan, Punjab, Pakistan
- Camera setup: Multi-camera setup
- Running time: 35-40 minutes
- Production company: Angelic Films in collaboration with Johns Hopkins University Center for Communication Programs

Original release
- Network: Urdu 1
- Release: 22 July – 19 December 2017

Mujhay Jeenay Do (transl. Let Me Live) is a 2017 Pakistani television series that aired on Urdu 1. Written by Shahid Nizami, the series has an ensemble cast including Hania Aamir, Gohar Rasheed, Mehreen Raheel, Nadia Jamil, Salman Shahid and Iffat Rahim.

The drama highlights the importance of education for everyone to improve the society and empowering women to break the existing social taboos and live their lives freely.

== Plot ==
Saira, a ten-year-old girl in a Pakistani village, is asked to marry Naseeb after her sister, Bushra, dies in childbirth, leaving behind a newborn. Yasmeen - Iftihar's wife, is an educated lady, who has dedicated her life to the betterment of women based in the village, while her husband lives in a city to earn a living. Yasmeen is the only woman in the village who cares for education and granting equal rights to women. She opposes Saira's wedding with Naseeb, as Saira is a child of a similar age as her son, Shahab; but Saira's family forcefully has her marry Naseeb to look after the baby as she is attached to him. Saira struggles in the marriage, especially as Naseeb grows abusive and controlling. Her childhood friend Shahab moves to the city but remains connected to her.

Shahina is Yasmeen's sister who is mistreated and abused by her husband Mehmood. He continuously asks her to get money from her sister after selling their maternal home. She is the mother of a daughter and during her second pregnancy she was physically abused by her husband because she couldn't fulfill her husband's demand of getting money from her sister, leading to miscarriage. Yasmeen takes care of Shahina, who seeks divorce from her abusive husband Mehmood.

Naseeb later marries Shahina, who mistreats Saira out of jealousy. Despite this, Saira grows up and secretly reconnects with Shahab, when he returns to the village during the holidays to enrol in college. When Saira suffers a miscarriage, Naseeb becomes suspicious of her bond with Shahab. Yasmeen tries to help Saira by proposing an alternative where Naseeb can divorce Saira and she will accept her as her daughter-in-law. This proposal enrages Naseeb and Saira's brother, Murad, who kills Yasmeen. Shahina eventually helps Saira escape, and she seeks freedom through khula (divorce).

== Cast ==
- Gohar Rasheed as Naseeb: Saira and Shahina's husband
- Sabeena Syed as Bushra: Naseeb's first wife and Saira's elder sister (dead)
- Hania Aamir as Saira: Naseeb's second wife and Shahab's love interest
  - Emaan Sher as younger Saira (child star)
- Mehreen Raheel as Shahina: Naseeb's third wife and Mehmood's ex-wife
- Sarmad Khoosat as Mehmood Alam: Shahina's ex-husband; Murad's friend
- Minsa Malik as Sitara: Mehmood and Shahina's daughter
- Nadia Jamil as Yasmeen: Shahab's mother; Shahina's sister; Iftikhar's first wife
- Raeed Muhammad Alam as Shahab (Shaboo): Saira's love interest
- Omair Rana as Iftikhar: Shahab's father
- Iffat Rahim as Saeeda: Shahab's stepmother; Iftikhar's second wife
- Salman Shahid as Khuda Baksh: Murad and Saira's father (dead)
- Ali Tahir as Murad: Saira's brother; Khairi's husband; Mehmood's friend
- Farah Tufail as Khairi: Murad's wife
- Hassan Mir as Kashif: Murad and Khairi's son
- Khalid Butt as the village's Molvi sahab
- Usama Khan as Dawood: Shahab's best friend and Sarpanch sahab's grandson
- Rashid Mehmood as village Sarpanch and politician

== Themes ==
The drama highlights considerable social and economic issues, uncovering deep-rooted problems in the villages of the less developed countries like Pakistan. The drama touches upon sensitive topics like:

- Child labour
- Child marriages
- Divorce or 'Khula' still considered a taboo
- Domestic violence
- Lack of education
- Lack of family planning
- Maternal mortality because of orthodox practices and not seeking medical facilities
- Marital rape
- Misogyny
- Polygyny
- Patriarchy leading to preference for male child
- Resistance to change leading to the decisions like honour killing

== Production ==
The serial is directed and produced by Angeline Malik of Kitni Girhain Baaki Hain fame under her banner Angelic Films, in collaboration with Johns Hopkins University Center for Communication Programs.

Nadia Jamil made her acting comeback after survival from cancer and her last appearance in Behadd (2013). Mehreen Raheel made a comeback to television after her last appearance in the 2015 series Tum Mere Kya Ho.
