= Mere Paas Paas =

- Written by: Samira Fazal
- Directed by: Misbah Khalid
- Starring: Nadia Jamil; Moammar Rana; Deepak Parwani
- Country of origin: Pakistan
- Original language: Urdu
- No. of episodes: 18

Production
- Producer: Momina Duraid
- Production company: Moomal Entertainment

Original release
- Network: Hum TV
- Release: 2005 – 2005

Mere Paas Paas (also spelled Meray Paas Paas) is a Pakistani television series produced by Momina Duraid, written by Samira Fazal, and directed by Misbah Khalid. It stars Nadia Jamil, Moammar Rana and Deepak Parwani in the leading roles. The series deals with themes such as single parenting, male-female friendship and the various social and emotional issues regarding the marriage of a young divorcee.

== Plot ==
The story revolves around a happily married couple, Emaan and Adil. Their happiness remains still until Emaan gets pregnant. Adil displeases over it, considering it a hurdle in the way of his ambitions and tries to get away from her. Emaan not only faces the physiological changes related to pregnancy but also her husband's displeasure who gets involved with her colleague, Kiran. Facing these hardships, Emaan befriends Shariq, a next-door neighbour who later falls hopelessly in love with her.

== Cast ==
- Nadia Jamil as Emaan
- Deepak Perwani as Adil
- Moammar Rana as Shariq
- Faisal Shah as Faizer
- Ayesha Sana as Kiran
- Ayesha Khan
- Arisha Razi

== Soundtrack ==
The original soundtrack of the series was sung by Atif Aslam and Hadiqa Kiani. The music was composed by Farrukh Abid and Shoaib Farrukh.

== Production ==
It was the first independent production of Momina Duraid. According to her, it was meant to help her husband and mother-in-law. Nadia Jamil said in an interview said that the project is very close to her heart as the raw appeal of the character touched her as an actor.

== Reception ==
Omair Alavi of the DAWN Images criticised the series for its adult themes on prime time TV, praising Moammar Rana's acting while panning Deepak Perwani's performance and questioning Nadia Jameel's choice of dramas. A reviewer from The Express Tribune noted its progressive storyline.

=== Awards and nominations ===
Award	Year	Category	Recipient(s)	Result	Ref.
Lux Style Awards	2006	Best Television Play - Satellite	Mere Paas Paas	Nominated	
Lux Style Awards	2006	Best Television Director - Satellite	Misbah Khalid	Nominated	
Lux Style Awards	2006	Best Television Actress - Satellite	Nadia Jamil	Nominated	
Lux Style Awards	2006	Best Television Actor - Satellite	Moammar Rana	Nominated	
