= Tamanna (2014 film) =

2014 film directed by Steven Moore

- Theatrical Poster
- Directed by: Steven Moore
- Written by: Steven Moore
- Based on: Sleuth by Anthony Shaffer
- Produced by: Sarah Tareen and Syed Mujtaba Ali Kazmi
- Starring: Mehreen Raheel; Omair Rana; Salman Shahid; Faryal Gohar
- Music by: Sahir Ali Bagga; Arthur Rathbone Pullen
- Production company: Concordia Productions
- Distributed by: Summit Entertainment; ARY Films
- Release date: 13 June 2014 (Pakistan)
- Running time: 82 minutes
- Countries: Pakistan; United Kingdom
- Language: Urdu
- Box office: Rs. 0.55 crore (US$20,000)

Tamanna (Urdu: تمنا; transl. Desire) is 2014 British-Pakistani film distributed by Royal Palm Group t/a Summit Entertainment (Pak) and Super Cinema and ARY Films and produced by Concordia Productions. A drama in the neo-noir genre the film is directed by a British director Steven Moore and produced by Pakistani producer Sarah Tareen. The film stars Omair Rana, Salman Shahid, Mehreen Raheel and Faryal Gohar.

Prior to release the film won an award at the London Asian Film Festival for the first released song by Rahat Fateh Ali Khan. Other songs included in the film are sung by Ali Azmat and Amanat Ali. The original score for the film was written by Arthur Rathbone Pullen son of Booker Prize nominee and best selling English author Julian Rathbone.

== Plot outline and theme ==
The film incorporates elements of dark humour, melodrama, crime, passion and revenge and is based on Anthony Shaffer’s play, Sleuth. The film's hero is Rizwan Ahmed (Omair Rana) a struggling actor who meets Mian Tariq Ali (Salman Shahid), a relic of the once thriving film industry. The struggling actor is there to convince Ali to divorce his wife. A contest of male dominance between the two men ensues, starting quite reasonably, playfully even, but eventually turning angry and violent.

Whilst some of the interactions between the two men are similar to the play Sleuth, the film has roles for not just the Wyke character's wife, but also his second, younger wife, who is the protagonist's object of desire. The milieu is Pakistan's film industry, Lollywood in its dying days. The outcome for the characters is dark, with more emphasis on being sacrificed than self-sacrifice, and is used an allegory of wider issues. The dialogue, in Urdu, and the scenario are adapted in numerous ways for Pakistani culture.

== Cast ==
- Omair Rana as Rizwan Ahmed
- Salman Shahid as Mian Tariq Ali
- Mehreen Raheel as Mehreen
- Faryal Gohar as Madame Fatima
- Rasheed Naz as special appearance

Both Salman Shahid and Faryal Gohar were cast first around 3 years before the film was eventually made, as early as 2009. They appear together in the video for the song Koi Dil Mein together not long after that in 2010. Omair Rana was not part of the film initially, his role as Riz the protagonist was given to Hameed Sheikh, who is famous for his role of Sher Shah in Shoaib Mansoor’s Khuda Kay Liye and as Omar Boloch in Kandahar Break. Mehreen Raheel was brought in very late, just before principal photography which took place in October 2012. Amongst scenes that were cut in the edit was Omair Rana with Rasheed Naz in Wazir Khan Mosque in the Walled City of Lahore, but does appear briefly on a TV set in the background at one point during the film. Sahir Lodhi, a famous Pakistani TV presenter, also makes a cameo voice appearance as a TV interviewer.

== Music ==
The film contains both original score and individual songs. The score of the film is composed by British Composer and musician Arthur Rathbone Pullen. The songs are sung by Pakistan's best known playback singer Rahat Fateh Ali Khan and Ali Azmat and composed by Sahir Ali Bagga. Amanat Ali sung the title track of Tamanna, composed by Afzal Hussain. The video of the titular song was filmed at Lahore's historic Barood Khana Haveli.

#	Song title	Singer	Composer	Lyrics
1	"Koi Dil Mein"	Rahat Fateh Ali Khan	Sahir Ali	Riaz ur Rehman Saghar
2	"Chell Oye"	Ali Azmat	Sahir Ali	Imran Raza
3	"Tamanna"	Amanat Ali	Afzal Hussain	Imran Raza

== Release ==
The first Look trailer was released in June 2013 and Koi Dil Mein before that as a song with video including some of the film's old Lollywood recreation footage from a mise en abyme technique of a film within a film. The film premiered on 13 June 2014 in Lahore Karachi and Islamabad then ran subsequently in cinemas around Pakistan for two weeks. The film is expected to screen at selected festivals in late 2014/2015 and was already screened at the Tricycle Theatre as part of the 16th London Asian Film Festival on 8 June 2014. The film had its worldwide TV premiere on 10 May 2015 on ARY Digital and is scheduled for regular showing by the channel which owns TV distribution rights.

=== Awards ===
- Rahat Fateh Ali Khan won London Asian Film Festival Award for Best Music Talent.

== See also ==
- List of highest-grossing Pakistani films
