= Dastaan (2010 TV series) =

- A promotional newspaper advertisement
- Also known as: Waqt Ne Kiya Kya Haseen Sitam (India) حب عبر الحدود (MENA)
- Genre: Period drama
- Based on: Bano by Razia Butt
- Written by: Samira Fazal
- Directed by: Haissam Hussain
- Starring: Fawad Khan; Sanam Baloch; Mehreen Raheel; Saba Qamar; Ahsan Khan
- Theme music composer: Mohsin Allah Ditta
- Country of origin: Pakistan
- Original language: Urdu
- No. of episodes: 23 (One special episode)

Production
- Producer: Momina Duraid
- Cinematography: Farhan Alam
- Running time: 40 minutes

Original release
- Network: Hum TV
- Release: 26 June – 4 December 2010

Dastaan (Urdu: داستان, lit. 'The tale') is a Pakistani television series based on the 1971 novel Bano by Razia Butt. Dramatized by author and screenwriter Samira Fazal, it originally aired on Hum TV in 2010. It is set amidst the partition of India and the establishment of Pakistan, taking place between 1947 and 1956. It depicts the story of Bano, a Muslim girl from a close-knit family living in Ludhiana, Punjab Province; the plot revolves around the trials and tribulations that she faces after she decides to dedicate her life to the All-India Muslim League.

Director Haissam Hussain stated in an interview that production for the drama began months in advance and that the filming only took a little over two months.

== Plot ==
Based on the true events of the partition of India in 1947, the series depicts the events of rioting and chaos in 1947.

Based on the novel Bano, Dastaan begins with the wedding of Suraiya and Salim. Suraiya's nephew Hassan was the son of Rasheeda. When Hassan's father died, he and his mother were kicked out of his father's house by his paternal family which was in Jalandhar, and they moved back to Rasheeda's maternal house in Ludhiana.

Bano, Suraiya, Faheem, Salim and Hassan were childhood friends, and all grew up together. When Hassan went to the university, he left home and went to Islamia College in Peshawar. Hassan returns for Saleem and Suraiya's wedding, where Hassan and Bano meet for the first time as adults after three years. The whole family gathered for the wedding, including Hassan's aunt Jameela from Amritsar, his aunt Sultana and her daughter Rabia from Lahore or Pindi.

Hassan spent most of his time at the wedding preaching the Quaid's message and the rest of it teasing his cousin Rabia and flirting with Bano. Although Rabia was only 14 years old and Hassan thought of her as a younger sister, she started developing feelings for him. As Hassan starts teasing and flirting with Bano, they slowly begin to develop feelings for each other, with Hassan visiting Ludhiana every now and then.

He is a final year engineering student at the Islamia College, an active supporter of the All-India Muslim League, and the leader of the Ludhiana Branch. He strongly believes in the establishment of Pakistan and is an avid follower of Qaid-E-Azam, the head of the Muslim League and Pakistan Movement. Saleem is an activist of the Indian National Congress, with all his friends being Hindu. He strictly believes that the creation of Pakistan will not help but lessen the position of Muslims in India.

The political debate between Saleem and Hassan begins as friendly competition, but it intensifies as conditions worsen throughout India for Muslims. Saleem, hot-tempered and rash, begins bringing political debates into family life and eventually forbids Suraiya from visiting Hassan, her nephew. But Hassan is not dissuaded. He continues to spread the message of Pakistan throughout Saleem's family, causing Saleem's anger to explode on many occasions. Other than Saleem, his entire family becomes strong supporters of the Muslim League, especially Bano, who makes posters and signs for the Pakistan Movement.

Bibi tells Suraiya that a marriage proposal has come for Bano from Patiala. Suraiya panics and tells her sister Rashida that Bano and Hassan like each other and have become close. She tells her that if they don't get married, then Bano will commit suicide, and Hassan will not marry anyone else either. Upon hearing this, Rashida takes her brother and sister-in-law and asks for Bano's hand in marriage for Hassan. Saleem overhears this and politely tells them they can leave because a proposal has come for Bano. Bano's parents become angry and ask Saleem who he has in mind, and Saleem tells them about his Hindu friend Ram. His parents immediately agree to Bano's proposal with Hassan. Hassan and Bano eventually become engaged, and Saleem decides to leave behind his rivalry with Hassan for Bano's sake. Soon, Hassan gets a job in Rawalpindi and has to leave immediately. He leaves Ludhiana with the promise that they will return four months later for the wedding. Meanwhile, Suraiya is four months pregnant.

During this time, tensions between Hindus and Muslims escalate dramatically, and violence breaks out all across India. Hate crimes against Muslims become common, and fighting spreads to all states, getting threateningly closer to Ludhiana. As the riots become more pronounced, Muslims retaliate, leaving nobody safe. Saleem seems to be under the impression that his Hindu friends and their families will be able to protect his family from rioters. However, he soon feels they are distant and aloof and realises he is wrong.

On a fateful night, a group of Sikhs and Hindus attack the family's home. All the men (which includes many other Muslims who sought refuge in their house) stay on the bottom floor with their swords and knives intending to fight. All the women (including Bano, Suraiya, and Bano's mother, Bibi, Sakina Khala and her daughters) are hiding on the roof of their house. All the men get killed brutally, while the women were raped and killed. Some women committed suicide to save themselves from that fate. Bano and Bibi, however, survive and are 'rescued' by Salim's Hindu friends.

Saleem's friend, Ram, tries to rape Bano, but his other friend saves her by killing Ram out of guilt. Bano and Bibi manage to escape Ludhiana, where they seek shelter in a refugee camp for Muslims. The Muslim refugees are led by a young brave Muslim man who lost his entire family. Thirsty and hungry, they try to walk to Pakistan, encountering poisoned wells along the way. Eventually, Hindu rioters attack this caravan. Bano and Bibi are separated, and both are gang raped. Bano crawls toward her mother's lifeless body, seeing her Ta'wiz necklace. Bano, grief-stricken and in shock, wears it and lies next to her body.

A Sikh man stumbles upon Bano and her dead mother, and he helps nurse her back to health. He then boards her on a train, heading from Jalandhar towards Lahore and leaves. It was common for trains to arrive in Lahore full of dead Muslims with only a few survivors and vice versa. Soon this train is attacked by rioters. Basant Singh, a rioter, chases after Bano on the train. She falls unconscious, and Basant Singh kidnaps her, bringing her to his home in Kapurthala. Bano awakens in the house where he and his mother live. At first, she refuses to tell them her name, so Basant Singh calls her Sundar Kaur, meaning "beautiful lioness" in Punjabi. He gives her the impression that he will take her to Pakistan once there is no danger. He also tells her she can write to Hassan, and he'll deliver the letters. Bano believes his lies and cannot wait to go to Pakistan.

Nearly a year later, Basant has not lived up to his promise, claiming that the roadways are blocked and travelling to Pakistan is too dangerous. Eventually, Bano learns of his plan to forcibly marry and convert her, and she attempts to run away again. This time though, when Basant catches her, he doesn't treat her gently as he did the first time. He spends the next five years beating, raping, and emotionally torturing Bano after forcibly marrying and converting her. However, she doesn't give up and makes his blood boil by shouting abuses at him and never forgetting that she is a Muslim. One day, Basant dies as he tries to save their infant son Bhagat Singh as he's about to fall from the roof. Bano takes her son and migrates to Pakistan.

In Pakistan, Hassan undergoes severe depression after realising that Suraiyyah, Bano and their other relatives must have been brutally raped and killed. He goes from a friendly extrovert to a miserable reserved person. For the next five years, his mother did not see him laugh. Seeing this, she asks him to get married, but he disagrees as he believes himself to be married to Bano. One day, Sultana, his aunt, with her children, visit them. Hassan is excited after a long time to meet his only surviving family, especially Rabia. Expecting the same fourteen-year-old child with ponytails whom he could tease again, he's astonished when he encounters a young woman instead. Hassan becomes distant from her as he senses her feelings. However, it's been five years since Bano's 'death', and he needs to move on. Later Rabia and her mother moved from Karachi to Lahore to meet Hassan and her mother. He tries to find Bano in Rabia and soon gets engaged to her.

Bano ends up in a shelter for refugees. The caretaker woman writes a letter to Hassan asking him to come and take Bano.

Hassan receives the letter and takes Bano and the child home. Hassan decides to marry Bano and wants to break off his engagement to Rabia. Rabia and her mother learn this and visit Hassan's house. Rabia's mother tells Rabia to take care of Bano to please Hassan. However, one day, he overhears a conversation between his parents about Rabia taking care of Bano so Hassan can see the goodness in her. He argues with Rabia, but Rabia insists that her love is truer than Bano's. Bano overhears this and interrupts them telling them that if they truly want to do something for her, they should get married. The next day, Hassan finds out that Bano has left the house. Hassan spends many days and weeks searching for Bano. He blames Rabia for this. Bano is living with a family where she does their household chores. She gets a job in a modern family where she realises Pakistan is not how she thought it would be. They fire her from the job. One day Hassan sees her in the mosque, and he runs after her to get her back home, but Bano asks her friend to go to Hassan and ask him to forget Bano. Hassan then goes home and agrees to marry Rabia as Bano had wished for their marriage. One day she goes to a birthday party where she meets a gentleman with similar thoughts to those of Bano. He offers Bano to come and work in his office, where they work for the welfare of people. Bano is happy and accepts his proposal.

One day, Rabia learns of Bano's whereabouts, and she begs her to marry Hassan. Eventually, Bano agrees and promises that she will come. She goes to her office, where the same gentleman leads her to the storage room and attempts to abuse her, but she stabs him to death. The police arrest her. Bano goes to a mental asylum for recovery. Later, Hassan and Rabia, now husband and wife, visit Bano.

== Cast ==
- Fawad Khan as Hassan
- Sanam Baloch as Bano (Sundar Kaur in Kapurthala)
- Mehreen Raheel as Rabia
- Ahsan Khan as Saleem; Bano's elder brother
- Saba Qamar as Suraiyyah; Saleem's wife
- Saba Hameed as Rasheeda; Hassan's mother
- Qavi Khan as Khwaja Naseer-ud-din; Bano's father
- Samina Peerzada as Saliha a.k.a. Bibi; Bano's mother
- Affan Waheed as Nadir; Hassan's friend
- Babrik Shah as Basant Singh/Basanta
- Seemi Raheel as Sakeena; Hassan's Maami
- Asma Abbas as Sultana; Rabia's mother
- Naeem Tahir as Rabia's Father
- Daniyal Raheel as Faheem; Bano's younger brother
- Anita Fatima Camphor as Jameela; Hassan's aunt
- Khayyam Sarhadi as Jameela's husband
- Humaira Ali as Kaamini
- Fawad Jalal as Laxman

=== Guest appearances ===
- Samina Ahmad as orphanage caretaker
- Shazia Afgan as Musarraut, Bano's friend
- Bilal Khan as social worker
- Sangeeta as Basanta's mother
- Nasreen Qureshi as Basanta's aunt
- Azra Mansoor as Musarrut's mother
- Farooq Zameer as Musarrut's father
- Kanwar Arsalan as a Carvan's leader
- Farah Tufail as Sikh villager

== Soundtrack ==
The Dastaan theme, "Aasmanon Se", was composed and sung by Sohail Haider and was written by Sahir Altaf. A frequent background music on the show played during scenes asserting Pakistani independence and Pakistani pride is based on the tune of Aye Watan Pyare Watan by Ustad Amanat Ali Khan.

== Production ==
=== Development and background ===
When asked to choose Razia Butt's novel Bano as the inspiration for Dastaan, Haissam Hussain revealed that, about three years ago, he had directed a telefilm by Umera Ahmad, Mutthi Bhar Mitti, which received a great response. Consequently, he and producer Momina Duraid decided to work on a project based on the theme of Partition. Razia Butt's novel Bano provided the perfect opportunity to pursue this theme.

Duraid revealed that she had read the novel Bano in her childhood and initially wanted to create a play about the Partition era. However, she was discouraged, as many believed it would be unsuccessful due to a perceived lack of interest in Partition-themed dramas. Undeterred, Duraid decided to adapt the novel Bano into a play. She met with Razia Butt, the novel's author, who entrusted Duraid with her work, saying, "I'm giving you my precious thing, make it good."

=== Production locations ===
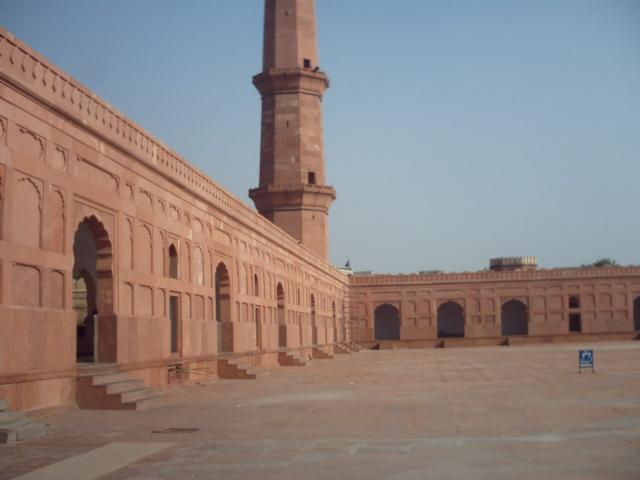
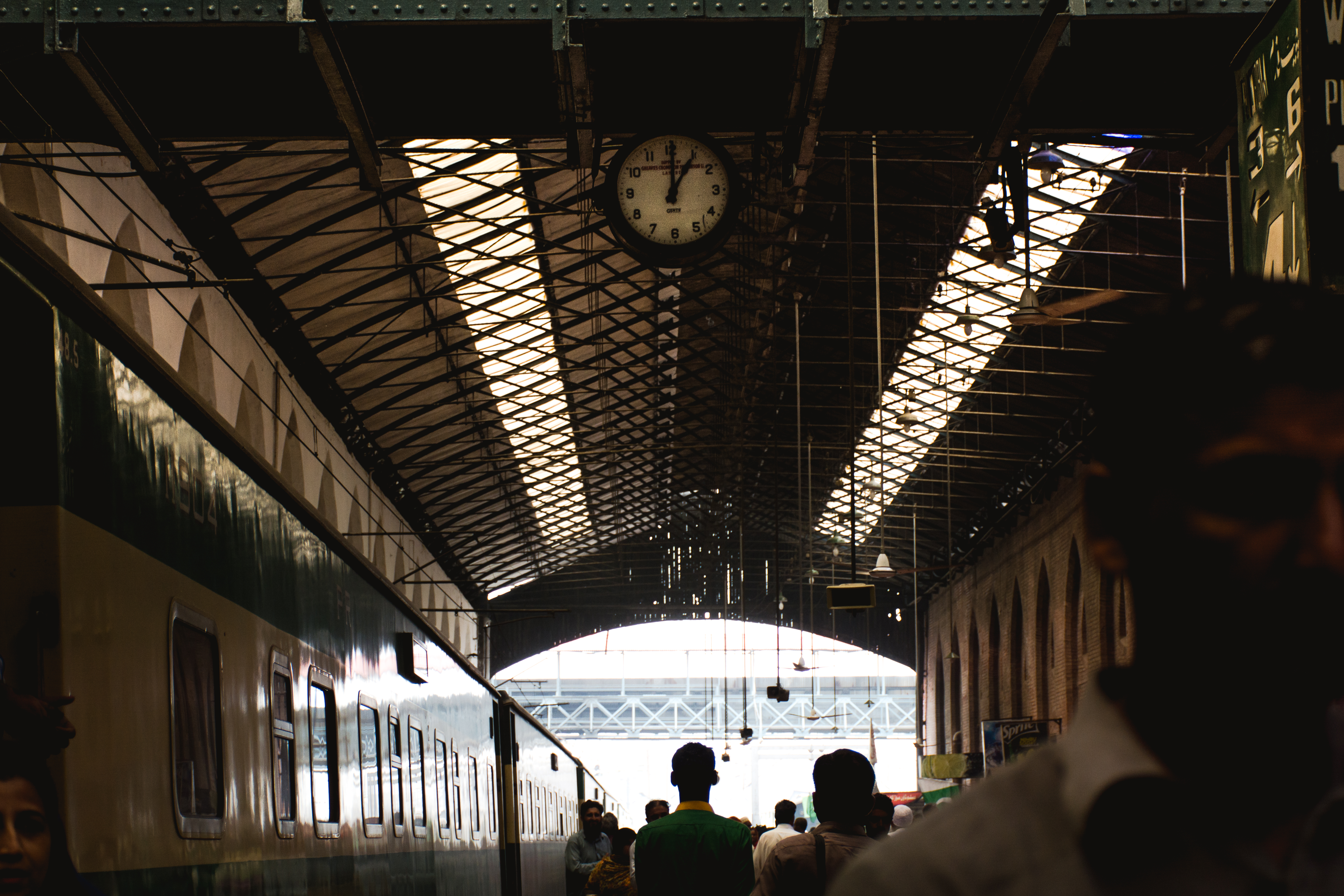
Notable locations in the series, Badshahi Mosque (left) and Lahore Junction railway station (right).

The principal photography takes place at a number of locations, primarily in Lahore. It starts out at a neighborhood of Lahore, which was portrayed as Ludhiana, India. The location changed with every couple of episodes as the story corresponds. Other locations include Karachi, Rawalpindi, and Kapurthala. Other notable locations include the Islamia College, Badshahi Mosque and Lahore Junction railway station.

== Release ==
=== International broadcast ===
Dastaan was aired in Middle East on MBC Bollywood under the title حب عبر الحدود (transl. Love Across Borders). It aired in India on Zindagi as Waqt Ne Kiya Kya Haseen Sitam from March 23, 2015. Previously, the show was to be titled Lakeerein. In the UK, the show was broadcast on Hum Europe, premiering on September 19, 2015.

=== Home media and digital release ===
The show was available for online streaming on Iflix from 2017 to 2019 and on the Indian streaming platform Eros Now. Hum TV uploaded the series on its official YouTube channel in May 2019.

== Reception ==
=== Critical reception ===
Dastaan was widely appreciated by the viewers and received positive reviews from critics due to its subject, genre, performances and direction. In a poll by Dawn, Dastaan was rated as the second best drama of 2010, after Dolly ki Ayegi Baraat, which aired on Geo Entertainment, and Sanam Baloch was voted best actress for Dastaan, with Mehreen Raheel in third place, while Samira Fazal was voted third best writer, also for Dastaan. It is among the few dramas to have received 4.5 stars from TV Kahani. The review said: "Please, do yourself a favor and watch this one. You will learn and be entertained at the same time." The News International praised it for illustrating minority representation with sensitivity.

DAWN Images ranked it as most iconic TV drama of Pakistan, praising the direction and for balancing the historical details and political sensitivities. People Magazine Pakistan included it amaong the best work on partition of the Indian subcontinent.

=== Reaction from India ===
A notice was issued by Justice Mukul Mudgal against Zindagi on account of complaints received by the Indian Ministry of Broadcasting and Information. It stated that the show had depicted Indians in a bad light.

== Awards and nominations ==
Year	Award	Category	Recipient(s)/ nominee(s)	Result	Ref.
2011	Pakistan Media Awards	Best Drama Serial	Dastaan	Won	
2011	Pakistan Media Awards	Best Drama Producer	Momina Duraid	Won	
2011	Pakistan Media Awards	Best Drama Director	Haissam Hussain	Won	
2011	Pakistan Media Awards	Best Drama Actress	Sanam Baloch	Won	
2011	Pakistan Media Awards	Best Drama Actor	Fawad Khan	Won	
2011	Pakistan Media Awards	Best Supporting Actress	Saba Qamar	Won	
2011	Pakistan Media Awards	Best Supporting Actor	Ahsan Khan	Won	
2011	Lux Style Awards	Best TV Play - Satellite	Dastaan	Nominated	
2011	Lux Style Awards	Best TV Director	Haissam Hussain	Won	
2011	Lux Style Awards	Best TV Actor - Satellite	Fawad Khan	Nominated	
2011	Lux Style Awards	Best TV Actress - Satellite	Sanam Baloch	Nominated	
2012	Hum Awards	Most Challenging Subject	Razia Butt	Won	
2012	Hum Awards	Most Challenging Subject	Momina Duraid	Won	
2012	Hum Awards	Most Challenging Subject	Haissam Hussain	Won	
2012	Hum Awards	Most Challenging Subject	Samira Fazal	Won	
