= Umro Ayyar – A New Beginning =

2024 Pakistani film

- Film poster
- Directed by: Azfar Jafri
- Written by: Atif Siddique
- Produced by: Huma Jamil Babar
- Starring: Usman Mukhtar; Faran Tahir; Sanam Saeed; Ali Kazmi; Hamza Ali Abbasi
- Cinematography: Riki Butland
- Edited by: Mitesh Soni
- Music by: Ahmed Ali
- Production company: VR Chili Production
- Distributed by: Mandviwalla Entertainment
- Release date: 17 June 2024
- Country: Pakistan
- Language: Urdu
- Budget: Rs. 35 crore (US$1.3 million)
- Box office: Rs. 18 crore (US$640,000)

Umro Ayyar – A New Beginning (Urdu: عمرو عیار - ایک نئی شروعات) is a 2024 Pakistani science fiction fantasy film, directed by Azfar Jafri and written by Atif Siddique. The film is based on the Persian-Urdu novel character Umro Ayyar from Hamzanama. The film is produced by Huma Jamil Babar under the banner of VR Chili Production. The film stars Usman Mukhtar as the titular character with Faran Tahir, Sanam Saeed, Ali Kazmi, Hamza Ali Abbasi and others.

The film premiered at CUE Cinema on 13 June 2024 in Lahore and was released theatrically on 17 June 2024.

== Plot ==
A descendant of Umro Ayyar, a cunning warrior of Persian folklore, is a quantum mechanics professor in Pakistan. With wit inherited, he ventures into a realm where fable meets reality, determined to unravel mysteries that transcend time and space.

== Cast ==
- Usman Mukhtar as Amar
  - Ruman Ali as young Amar
- Faran Tahir as Laqqa
- Sanam Saeed as Meena
- Ali Kazmi as Maaz
- Adnan Siddiqui as Amar's father
- Seemi Raheel as Aunt Farhana
- Sana Fakhar as Cheno
- Manzar Sehbai as Guru
- Osama Karamat as Shayan
- Daniyal Raheal as Babar
- Salmaan Shaukat as Azam
- Uloomi Karim as Goon
- Muhammad Usman Malik as Kazmi
- Asad Chaudhary as Safeer
- Atif Rehan Siddique as Doctor
- Shehroz Sunny as the tribal leader
- Hamza Ali Abbasi as Umro Ayyar (special appearance)

== Release ==
On 13 June 2024, it premiered in Lahore and was released in cinemas on 17 June (Eid al-Adha), distributed by Mandviwalla Entertainment.

== Reception ==
The film participated in the Red Sea Film Festival. Dunya News praised it "a visual treat you should not miss." Khaleej Times said it is a good introduction to Pakistan's first superhero. The film was also reviewed by The Express Tribune and DAWN.

== Box office ==
This film has emerged as the highest-grossing Pakistani production of the year, surpassing Daghabaaz Dil in domestic earnings. As per box office analyst Ali Zain, it has amassed approximately 13.4 crore PKR in Pakistan. Internationally, it has generated around $160,000 (4.5 crore PKR), bringing its total worldwide earnings to nearly 18 crore PKR. Despite this success, the film remains the second highest-grossing movie of the year in Pakistan overall, with Jatt & Juliet 3 leading at over 16 crore PKR. However, due to its reportedly high budget, the film failed to recover its costs.

== See also ==
- List of Pakistani films of 2024
