= Razia Butt =

Pakistani novelist and playwright (1924-2012)

Razia Butt رضیہ بٹ
- Born: 19 May 1924; Rawalpindi, Punjab, British India
- Died: 4 October 2012 (aged 88); Lahore, Punjab, Pakistan
- Occupations: Writer, playwright, novelist
- Writing career
- Genre: Fiction
- Subjects: Socialism, romance
- Notable works: Saiqa, Naila, Bano, Najia

Razia Butt (Urdu: رضیہ بٹ) was an Urdu novelist and playwright from Pakistan. One of the famous popular fiction writer of the 1960s and 1970s, she is often compared with English writer Barbara Cartland due to her popularity among the household readers.

Some of her works have been adapted into television serials and films, including Bano.

== Background ==
Razia Niaz was born in Rawalpindi on 19 May 1924. She spent most of her childhood in Peshawar.

== Career ==
Her writings first appeared in a literary journal around 1940 when she was in her teens. She later developed her first published story into a novel, Naila. Butt also wrote radio plays. Films such as Naila, and Saiqa are based on her novels. In 2007, Hum TV bought the rights of her eight novels including Najia, Saiqa and Bano which were adapted by the network as Najia, Saiqa and Dastaan respectively.

Married in 1946, Razia Butt resumed writing in 1950s after a break of some years. She wrote 51 novels and 350 short stories.

Butt wrote an autobiography, Bichhray Lamhe.

== Death ==
Razia Butt died in Lahore on 4 October 2012 after a protracted illness.

== Bibliography ==
=== Novels ===
- Aadhi Kahani (Lit: Half a story)
- Aag (Lit: Fire)
- Aaina (Lit: Mirror)
- Aneela
- Bano (adapted as TV drama Dastan)
- Beena
- Chahat
- Darling
- Faslay (Lit: Distances)
- Mein kon hon (Lit: Who am I?)
- Naila
- Najia
- Nasoor
- Noreena
- Reeta
- Roop
- Sabeen
- Saiqa (novel)
- Wehshi
- Samina
- Sawaneh
- Shabbo
- Zindgi (Lit: Life)
- Amma (Mother) (adapted as TV drama written by Ahmed Naveed)
- Mehru
- Zari

=== Others ===
- Bichhray Lamhe (autobiography)

== Dramatisation of works ==
=== Television ===
- Amma (mother) dramatized by drama writer Ahmed Naveed.PTV
- Bano as Dastaan – Hum TV 2010
- Naila
- Noerena (PTV 1995)
- Saiqa – Hum TV – 2009
- Wehshi (HUM TV) 2022

=== Films ===
- Naila (1965)
- Saiqa (1968)
- Anila (1969)
- Noreen (1970)
- Mohabbat (1972)
- Khalish (1972)
- Payasa (1973)
- Mohabbat ho to aisi (1989)
- Gulabo (2008)

== Awards ==
- 1969 - Nigar Award for Best Scriptwriter of Saiqa.
- 2012 - Hum Honorary Most Challenging Subject Award for Dastaan
