= Ashk (TV series) =

- Genre: Drama; Romance
- Written by: Zafar Mairaj
- Directed by: Sarmad Sultan Khoosat
- Starring: Fawad Khan, Resham
- Country of origin: Pakistan
- Original language: Urdu
- No. of episodes: 23

Production
- Producers: Abdullah Kadwani; Humayun Saeed
- Running time: 30-40 Minutes
- Production company: 7th Sky Entertainment

Original release
- Network: Geo Entertainment
- Release: June 12, 2012 – November 2012

Ashk (transl. Teardrop) is a Pakistani drama serial written by Zafar Mairaj. It is directed by Sarmad Sultan Khoosat and produced by Abdullah Kadwani and Humayun Saeed. It aired every Tuesday at 8:35pm on GEO TV. Its tagline is, 'Love Perfected Through Pain'. The title song is composed by Waqar Ali and sung by Sajjad Ali. It aired from June 12, 2012, to November, 2012. In India, it aired on Zindagi under the same title.

== Plot ==
Fawad Khan as Rohail is on his way to marry his cousin Mehr-u-Nisa (Resham) in Pakistan. Rohail has never experienced the sweetness or the pain of love, though his friend back at home in Turkey, Madiha (Mehreen Raheel) has only loved him. Madiha is not happy. She tries to stop him but is unable to. Mehr-u-Nisa's only sister, Zaib-u-Nisa (Neelam Muneer) venerates her and devises a master plan to test Rohail. Rohail falls in love with Zaib-u-Nisa. Even her imperfections appear perfect to him as reason is powerless in the face of love. Will his love stand the test of time?

== Cast ==
- Fawad Khan as Rohail Hayat
- Seemi Raheel as Rohail's Mother
- Resham as Mehru (Mehrunissa)
- Mehreen Raheel as Madiha
- Neelam Munir as Zebu (Zebunnissa)
- Sohail Sameer as Bilal
- Mohsin Gillani as Mansoor
- Irfan Khoosat as Ramzan (Bilal's father)
- Shafqat Cheema as Dinga
- Tipu Shareef as Bhedi Singh

== Critical reception ==
A reviewer from The Express Tribune praised the talented cast of Ashk, fresh pairings, and cinematography, as well as its attempt to address social issues, but criticised the poor script, glorification of social vices, family-unfriendly dialogues and excessive song sequences.
