= Ayesha Sana =

Pakistani performing actress (born 1972)

- Born: 12 November 1972 (age 53); Lahore, Punjab, Pakistan
- Occupation: Actress
- Spouse(s): Yousuf Baig Mirza (m. 2003-2012); Tariq Fawad Khawaja (m. 1993-1997)
- Children: 2

Ayesha Sana (Punjabi, Urdu: عائشہ ثنا) (born 12 November 1972) is a Pakistani performing actress who has appeared in television morning shows, film, television, and theatre performances.

== Early life and career ==
Ayesha Sana was born on 12 November 1972 in Lahore.

She once hosted a television show called Lines of Style!. She facilitated a morning show Meena Bazaar in 2006 and 2007 on PTV Home. It was a presentation of PTV Karachi Centre.

In 2009, Sana rejoined PTV Home as a morning show anchor again from PTV Lahore Centre in a morning show named Meena Bazaar with Ayesha Sana.

== Personal life ==
Sana was married to Tariq Fawad Khawaja for four years; from 1993 to 1997, when they divorced. They had one child together, a son named Ahad, born in 1994. Her second marriage was with Yousuf Baig Mirza, whom she married from 2003 until their divorce in 2012. She had a second child, another son, with Mirza named Muhammad Mustafa, born in 2011.

Following her second marriage, Sana moved to London, United Kingdom with Mirza and her son Ahad, where they stayed for six months; from June to December 2003, then lived in Karachi for another three years before returning to Lahore.

At some point after her second divorce, she once again moved with only her younger son to London, where they currently reside.

== Television ==
Year	Title	Role	Channel	Notes	Ref
	Pehli Barish		PTV Home		
1997	Miss Fit		PTV Home		
2000	Kanch Ke Par		PTV Home		
2006	Lagan		PTV Home		
2008	Kuch Apne Kuch Paraye	ATV			
2009	Saiqa	Sadia	Hum TV		
2006	Makan	Zahra	Geo TV		
2011	Meray Paas Paas		Hum TV		
2011	Babul		PTV Home		
2016	Dhaani		Geo TV		
2017	Yeh Raha Dil	Fatima	Hum TV		
2017	Naseebon Jali		Hum TV		
2017	Adhi Gawahi	Bee Ji	Hum TV		
2018	De Ijazat	Salma	Hum TV		

== Awards and nominations ==
- 2005 The 1st Indus Drama Awards: Nominated for Best Actress Drama Series in a Supporting Role

== See also ==
- List of Pakistani actresses
