= Jupiters =

Pakistani music band

The Jupiters
- Years active: 1985s–2001
- Past members: Ali Azmat; Tauqeer Hussain; Najam Shiraz; Majid Hussain; Shahzad Ahmed; Bilal Hafeez; Irfan Kiani; Jawad Ahmad; Salman Majid; Mudassir Ali; Hammad Baily; Shazi (Aamir Tufaiel); Amir Munawar; Shakir Awan; Tahir Saqi; Kamran Rashid (Later became a professor); Danny William; Azhar Waheed

The Jupiters (Urdu: جوپیٹرز) were a Pakistani band who are considered one of the pioneers of pop music in Pakistan.

Although the band released only a few albums, it became a nursery for many notable future singers. The hit song "Yaaro Yehi Dosti Hai" sung by one of the vocalists Ali Azmat topped the music charts in Pakistan in the early 1990s, and is still a famous number there. This popular song is from their album Jupiters Vol.1, released in 1989.

The Jupiters disbanded in the late 1990s and is remembered as a party band in the city of Lahore. The band's drummer-cum-composer Sahir Ali Bagga became an influential composer in his solo career and was behind several hits by acclaimed singer Rahat Fateh Ali Khan.

== Notable members ==
- Ali Azmat, the future lead singer of Sufi/rock band Junoon.
- Jawad Ahmad, later became a pop singer in Pakistan
- Bilal Hafeez, founder of the band and lead singer (song -"Saray Gidhay Wich")
- Shakir Awan, band's drummer after Bagga left. He remained associated with the band until its dissolution.
- Irfan Kiani, lead singer, brother of Hadiqa Kiani
- Amir Munawar, lead singer, well-known music composer
- Tahir Saqi, lead singer
- Shahzad Ahmad, band's last lead singer before the band collapsed
- Kamran Rashid
- Najam Shiraz
- Shazi (Aamir Tufaiel) became the bassist of Jal the Band in 2002

== See also ==
- List of Pakistani music bands
