= Khuwahish =

Pakistani television drama series

- Title screen
- خواہِش
- Genre: Drama
- Written by: Asghar Nadeem Syed
- Directed by: Rashid Dar
- Starring: Rani Begum; Abid Ali; Seemi Raheel; Nida Mumtaz; Sohail Asghar
- Country of origin: Pakistan
- Original language: Urdu
- No. of seasons: 1
- No. of episodes: 13

Production
- Producer: Rashid Dar

Original release
- Network: PTV
- Release: 1993 – 1993

Khuwahish (Urdu: خواہِش, lit. 'Wish') is a 1993 Pakistani television drama series written by Asghar Nadeem Syed and directed and produced by Rashid Dar. It was broadcast on PTV and comprises thirteen episodes. It was one of two television serials made by the film actress Rani Begum in the early 1990s.

== Plot ==
Nafeesa Begum is a wealthy widow who finds her privileged life unfulfilling and isolating. Khushi Muhammad is a truck driver of modest means who strives to support his family through honest labour. The drama examines the contrasting circumstances of the two central characters, exploring themes of class, social expectation, and personal desire in Pakistani society.

== Cast ==
- Rani Begum as Nafeesa Begum
- Abid Ali as Khushi Muhammad
- Seemi Raheel as Basanti
- Nida Mumtaz as Badray
- Sohail Asghar as Ruliya
- Nighat Butt as Chiragh Bibi
- Noman Shah as SP Jamil
- Jeevan Sultan as DSP
- Azmul Haq as Dil Muhammad
- Nisar Qadri as Sukhia
- Hina Shaheen as Rozi
- Sonia Khan as Razia
- Firdous Jamal as Anwar
- Asim Bukhari as Rasheed
- Qudsia Bano as Sabira
- Khalid Moin Butt as Billa
- Javed Kodu as Kodu
- Mujahid Abbas as Chiria wala
- Iram Hassan as Aashi
- Mehran Qavi as Farhad
- Zareena Ahmad as Massi
- Naeem Ahmad Butt as Mashooq Ali
- Khursheed Shaukat as Lawyer
