= Serial Killer (TV series) =

2023–2024 Pakistani television series

- Genre: Crime thriller
- Written by: Umera Ahmed
- Directed by: Fahad Noor
- Starring: Saba Qamar; Sabeena Farooq; Faiza Gillani; Daniyal Raheel
- Country of origin: Pakistan
- Original language: Urdu
- No. of episodes: 11

Production
- Producer: Misbah Shafique

Original release
- Network: Green Entertainment
- Release: 27 December 2023 – February 2024

Serial Killer is a Pakistani crime thriller television series written by Umera Ahmed. The series stars Saba Qamar, Sabeena Farooq, Faiza Gillani and Daniyal Raheel in prominent roles. It premiered on Green Entertainment on 27 December 2023 and concluded in February 2024.

== Plot ==
Set in Lahore, the series follows Sarah Sikandar, a police officer appointed to investigate a murder involving a woman's body discovered inside a suitcase. As the investigation progresses, the police uncover connections between the victim, a social media personality, and several other individuals. The story explores the investigation, the challenges faced by Sarah within the police department and the secrets surrounding the murders.

== Cast ==
- Saba Qamar as Sarah Sikandar, a Superintendent of Police
- Sabeena Farooq as Amna Tufail, also known as Zarish
- Faiza Gillani as Babra, a beauty salon owner
- Daniyal Raheel as Shahzain
- Fahad Hashmi as DSP Mehboob
- Amna Malik
- Ahmed Randhawa
- Shah Fahad
- Sarmad Aftab Jadran
- Ali Hasan

== Production ==
=== Development ===
The series was written by Umera Ahmed and directed by Fahad Noor. Misbah Shafique served as its producer. The story was developed as a murder mystery centred on a police investigation and the discovery of a woman's body in a suitcase.

=== Music ===
The original soundtrack was written by Sohail Shehzad and performed by Zeb Bangash.

== Reception ==
In a review published on 4 January 2024, Dawn Images described the series as a promising thriller, highlighting its focus on investigation, forensic evidence and unconventional storytelling.

In a review published by Dawn, Sadaf Haider criticised the series for its weak character development, unconvincing interrogation sequences and portrayal of the police department. The review also questioned the predictability of the murderer's revelation and the limited exploration of the motivations behind the killings.
