= Deepak Perwani =

Pakistani fashion designer and actor (born 1974)

- Born: Seth Deepak Kumar Perwani; 25 December 1973 (age 52); Mirpurkhas, Sindh, Pakistan
- Occupations: Fashion designer; actor; model
- Years active: 1994–present
- Relatives: Naveen Perwani (cousin)
- Website: deepakperwani.com

Deepak Perwani (born 25 December 1973) (Sindhi: ديپڪ پرواني Urdu: دیپک پروانی) is a Pakistani fashion designer and actor. In 1996, he introduced the fashion label Deepak Perwani (DP) as a bridal and formal wear couture house. The Bulgarian Fashion Awards named Perwani the sixth-best fashion designer in the world in 2014.

Perwani's accolades include seven Lux Style Awards and a Guinness World Record for designing the largest kurta in the world. He has been Pakistan's cultural ambassador to China and Malaysia, and regularly represents the country's fashion scene at local and international events. He has designed for high-profile figures such as Javed Akhtar and Shabana Azmi, among other celebrities. Additionally, Perwani has acted in a few TV shows and films, having made his debut in the drama Mere Paas Paas (2004–05).

== Life and career ==
Perwani was born in 1974 in a Sindhi Hindu family of Pakistan, and was raised in Mirpurkhas. His cousin, Naveen Perwani, is a snooker player who has represented the country globally in several tournaments. Deepak pursued a year-long course in Fashion Institute of Technology, New York, before returning to Pakistan in 1994. In 1996, Perwani introduced his own fashion label, Deepak Perwani (DP), as a bridal and formal wear couture house and also opened a flagship store in Zamzama.

In his career, he has collaborated with international brands such as Mercedes-Benz, Benson & Hedges and Hugo Boss. Perwani holds a Guinness World Record for designing the largest kurta in the world—that took a team of fifty professional tailors and thirty days to make it, weighing 800 kg, 101 feet tall and 59 feet 3 inches wide, with each sleeve being 57 feet long.

Perwani has been Pakistan's cultural ambassador to China and Malaysia, the brand ambassador for the World Gold Council, and is also a member of South Asia Free Media Association (SAFMA). He has won seven Lux Style Awards, five BFA awards, and one Indus Style Guru Award.

Besides fashion designing, Perwani has also acted in a few films and TV shows. He made his debut in Mere Paas Paas (2004–05) and later appeared in the successful drama Kadoorat (2013) alongside Sanam Saeed, which was followed by Soteli (2014) opposite Sabreen Hisbani. He played supporting characters in Yunhi (2023) and Very Filmy (2024).

In 2025, he appeared in the drama Sanwal Yaar Piya on Geo Entertainmen and Jama Taqseem on Hum TV.

== Media image ==
Perwani is accredited in the media as the first designer to make a mark in male fashion in Pakistan. He regularly represents the country's fashion scene at various local and international events, and has designed for high-profile figures such as the Indian writer Javed Akhtar and actresses Shabana Azmi and Frieha Altaf. His designs were also used to launch Nadia Hussain—Pakistan's first supermodel. Perwani earned an image of "bad boy" of men's fashion owing to his unconventional designs. Actress and model Vaneeza Ahmad calls him the most innovative designer she has worked with.

Journalist Sameer Arshad of The Times of India refers to Perwani as the global face of Pakistani fashion and one of the "enduring symbols of the country's soft power". In 2014, the Bulgarian Fashion Awards (BFA) named Perwani the sixth-best fashion designer in the world, ranking him number one in the Middle East region. Perwani is also the only Pakistani designer to be featured in the Atlas of Fashion Designers by Laura Eceiza.

He is active on the social media applications Twitter, Instagram and Facebook. Suktara Ghosh of The Quint included him in her listing of "Five Pakistani fashion designers you must follow on Instagram". Perwani has been vocal on his Twitter handle against the forced conversions of young Hindu girls in Sindhi region of Pakistan.

== Filmography ==
=== Television series ===
Year	Title	Role	Channel	Ref(s)
2004–05	Mere Paas Paas	Adil	Hum TV	
2013	Kadoorat	Mahmud	Hum TV	
2014	Soteli		ARY Digital	
2015	Meri Jaan		Hum TV	
2023	Yunhi	Naveed Ali	Hum TV	
2024	Very Filmy	Ehsaan	Hum TV	
2024	Qarz e Jaan	Bakhtiar Ahmad	Hum TV	
2025	Jama Taqseem		Hum TV	
2025	Sanwal Yaar Piya	Khaqan	Geo Entertainment	

=== Films ===
Year	Title	Role	Notes	Ref(s)
2017	Punjab Nahi Jaungi	Fashion designer		
2018	Altered Skin	Farooq		
