= Kahani Raima Aur Manahil Ki =

Pakistani television series

- opening sequence
- Written by: Faiza Iftikhar
- Directed by: Fahim Burney
- Creative directors: Imtiaz Ijaz Khan; Awais Javeed
- Starring: Sajal Aly; Mehreen Raheel; Vasay Chaudhry; Shahroz Sabzwari
- Voices of: Habib-ul-Rehmaan
- Opening theme: Teray Meray Khuaboon Ke Kahaniyan
- Composer: Sohail Haider
- Country of origin: Pakistan
- Original language: Urdu
- No. of episodes: 20

Production
- Producer: Afzal Ali
- Production locations: Karachi, Islamabad
- Editors: Rajesh Kamal, Zafar Ali
- Running time: 40-45 minutes
- Production company: Mushroom Productions

Original release
- Network: Hum TV
- Release: 25 February – 20 August 2014

Kahani Raima Aur Manahil Ki (transl. "Story of Raima and Manahil") is a Pakistani television series premiered on Hum TV on 25 February 2014. It stars Sajal Aly, Mehreen Raheel, Vasay Chaudhry, and Shahroz Sabzwari as leads. The series follows the story of two couples one of which hate each other while the other couple love each other.

== Plot ==
The story revolves around two couples: Wahaj and Raima, who are married but hate each other, and Abrar and Manahil, who love each other but face financial obstacles to marry each other.

Abrar works at Raima's boutique, while Manahil is Wahaj's secretary. They cannot marry due to financial problems and family obligations. Raima and Wahaj try to make each other jealous, while Abrar and Manahil face challenges.

Raima falls in love with Wahaj after he takes care of her when she's shot. Meanwhile, Abrar and Manahil's families agree to their marriage proposal. However, misunderstandings drive the couples apart.

Wahaj and Raima clear up their issues and work together to reunite Abrar and Manahil. Raima and Wahaj help the couple resolve their misunderstandings, and eventually, Abrar and Manahil get married.

== Cast ==
- Sajal Aly as Manahil "Bubly"
- Mehreen Raheel as Raima
- Shehroz Sabzwari as Abrar "Bunty"
- Vasay Chaudhry as Wahaj
- Humaira Bano as Aasiya, Manahil's Mother
- Shaheen Khan as Zainab, Abrar's mother
- Ahmed Ali Butt as Wahaj's friend
- Irfan Khoosat as Raima's father
- Saima Naz as Sehar; Abrar's sister

== Soundtrack ==
Kahani Raima Aur Manahil Ki Original Sound Track (OST)

Soundtrack album by Dua Malik and Natasha Baig
- Genre: Theme song
- Length: 2:04
- Language: Urdu
- Producer: Syed Afzal Ali

The soundtrack is composed by Sohail Keys. It is sung by Dua Malik and Natasha Baig, and the guitars are done by Abid Wilson. The title song video is done by Sajal Ali and Mehreen Raheel.

Track list
No.	Title	Singer(s)	Length
1.	"Tere Mere Khuwaboon Ke Kahaniyan"	Dua Malik, Natasha Baig	2:04

== Production ==
Kahani Raima Aur Manahil Ki was produced by Afzal Ali, written by Faiza Iftikhar and directed by Fahim Burney. The show features Sajal Ali, Mehreen Raheel, Vasay Chaudhary, and Shehroz Sabzwari. The series' original soundtrack is performed by Dua Malik and Natasha Baig. Produced by Mushroom Production, th series' premiered on Hum TV on February 25, 2014.
