= Seemi Raheel =

Pakistani actress

- Born: 26 February 1957 (age 69); Sialkot, Punjab, Pakistan
- Other name: Simi Raheal
- Occupation: Actress
- Years active: 1974–present
- Relatives: Mehreen Raheal (daughter); Daniyal Raheal (son)

Seemi Raheel (born 26 February 1957) is a Pakistani actress working in Urdu television and films for over five decades. She was one of the most popular actresses of the 1970s, 1980s and 1990s. She is the mother of actors Mehreen Raheal and Daniyal Raheal.

== Filmography ==
Key
†	Denotes film / serial that has not released yet

=== Film ===
Year	Title	Role	Notes
2007	Khuda Ke Liye	Mansoor's mother	
2018	Teefa In Trouble	Baybae; Teefa's widowed mother	
2024	Umro Ayyar - A New Beginning	Farhana	

=== Television series ===
Year	Title	Role	Notes
1974	Aik Mohabbat So Afsanay	Noor	PTV
1975	Aghoshewida	Saira	PTV
1991	Bacho Ka Park	Ayesha	PTV
1992	Khoobsurat	Hina Qureshi	PTV
1993	Khuwahish	Basanto	PTV
1995	Shikast	Laila	PTV
1996	Sona Mila Na Pee Milay	Mai Bilori	PTV
1997	Family Front	Ani	PTV
1998	Jaan Ke Lale	Wahida	PTV
1998	Apne Aur Sapne	Ayesha	PTV
1999	Monsoon	Natasha	PTV
2000	Inkaar	Shehla	PTV
2000	Chamak	Rashida Begum	PTV
2001	Dasht-e-Tanhai Main	Rafia Khalid Ahmed	PTV
2001	Sawan	Kulsoom Begum	PTV
2001	Hawa Pe Raqs	Zeeni	PTV
2002	Landa Bazar	Surayya Batool	PTV
2009	Mannchalay	Sabiha Begum	
2010	Dastaan	Sakeena, Hassan's aunt	
2011	Faseel-e-Jaan Se Aagay	Ammi	PTV
2012	Pheli Barish	Nuzhat	PTV
2012	Mein	Inayat Begum	PTV
2012	Tanha	Mrs. Khan	PTV
2012	Koi Meray Dil Say Pouchay	Samina	PTV
2012	Ashk	Rohail's mother	
2012	Sasural Ke Rang Anokhay	Herself	
2013	Sannata	Najma	
2013	Kami Reh Gaee	Laila's mother	PTV
2014	Dard	Bee Jan	PTV
2014	Izteraab	Jazib's mother	
2014	Kis Se Kahoon	Mrs. Qureshi	
2014	Laa	Naina's mother	
2015	Maan	Bibi; Imaan's mother	
2016	Kitni Girhain Baaki Hain 2	Mehru's mother	Episode 29
2016	Bhai	Shakeela	
2016	Faltu Larki	Tajwar and Moazzam Jah's mother	
2017	Sammi	Zarina	
2017	Baaghi	Abid's mother	
2018	Silsilay	Naila	
2018	Maryam Periera	Mariam's mother	
2019	Anaa	Saadia Begum	
2020	Sabaat	Mrs Bushra Aziz	
2020	Ruswai	Zakiya, Sameera's mother	
2021	Dil Na Umeed To Nahi	Zulfi's mother	
2021	Ishq E Laa	Khadija, Azka's mother	
2022	Dil Awaiz	Akka Bibi	
2024	Dil-e-Nadan	Dilshad	
2025	Ism-e-Yaraan	Amma Bi	
2026	Zanjeerain		

=== Telefilm ===
Year	Title	Role
2023	Budhi Ghori Laal Lagam	Ayesha
2025	Meri Uraan	Mujeeb's mother

== Awards and nominations ==
Year	Award	Category	Result	Title	Ref.
2001	PTV Awards	Best Actress	Won	Dasht-e-Tanhai Main	
