= Sahir Ali Bagga =

Pakistani singer, composer and music director

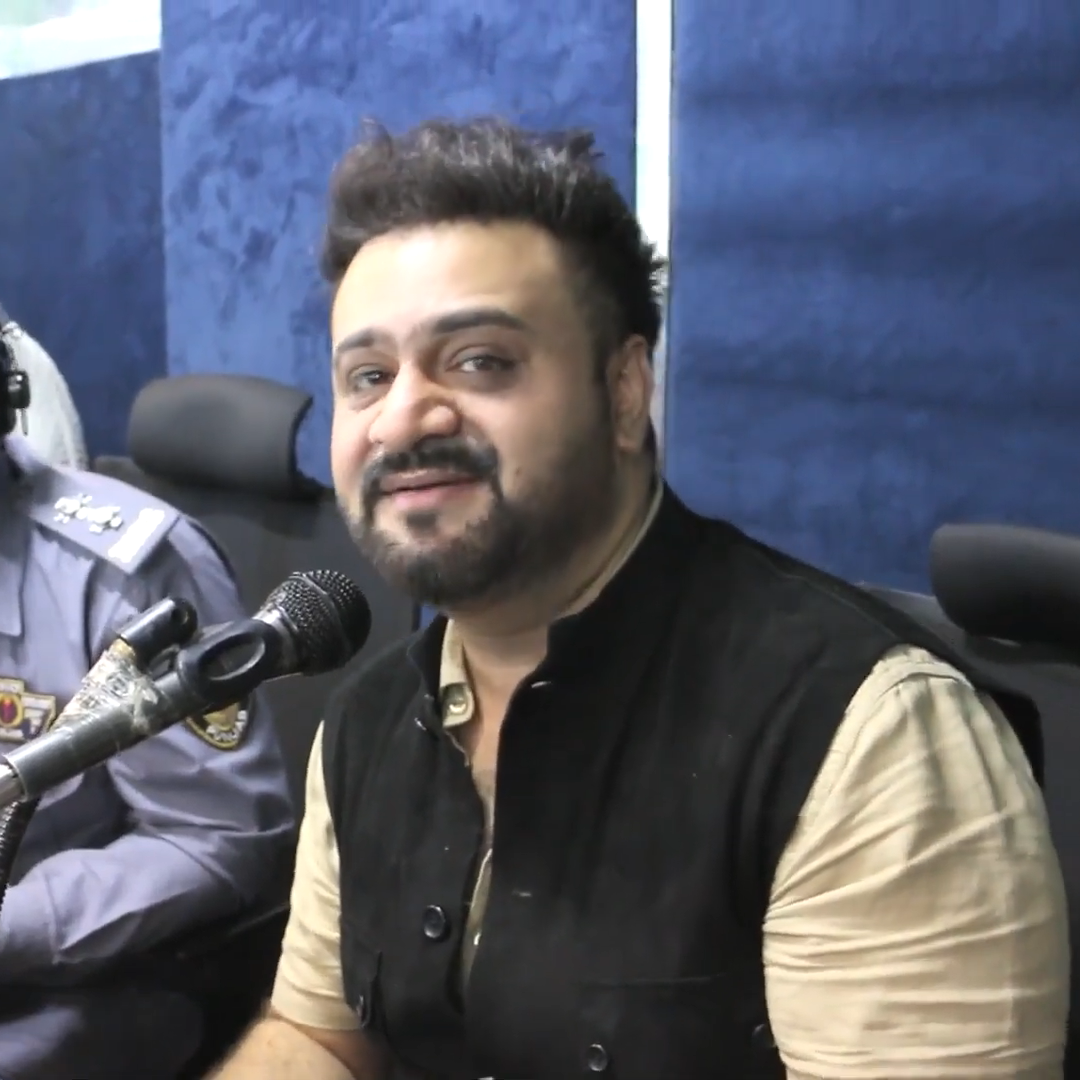
- Bagga in 2019
- Born: Lahore, Pakistan
- Occupations: Composer, music director, singer and instrumentalist for films and television
- Years active: 2009 – present
- Known for: Associated acts with: Pritam Chakraborty, Rahat Fateh Ali Khan, Shafqat Amanat Ali Khan, Coke Studio Pakistan
- Awards: Pride of Performance Award by the President of Pakistan in 2020
- Website: sahiralibagga.com

Sahir Ali Bagga is a Pakistani singer, music director and composer from Lahore, who composes music for Lollywood and other independent singers.

Recently he has composed music for the Pakistani movie, Zinda Bhaag (2013). He also worked on the soundtrack of Pakistani movies, Hijrat (2016) and Tamanna (2014), contributing two songs to the latter; Koi Dil Mein and Chell Oi.

He has also composed music of Hum TV's Ishq-e-Benaam. He gained some added recognition by appearing on Coke Studio (Pakistan). "Yeh mumkin tou nahin", "Malang", "Baazi", "Rab Waaris", "Roye Roye", "Dhola" and "Badnamiyan" are his famous soundtracks.

== Early life ==
Sahir Ali Bagga was born on 10 April 1980 in Lahore, Pakistan, into a musically inclined family. His father, Amjad Hussain, was a renowned music composer and drummer active during the 1970s.

Bagga received his initial musical training from members of the family of Ustad Tafu, a prominent figure in Pakistani classical music. Demonstrating a passion for music from a young age, he began composing during his early school years, often creating melodies inspired by newspaper headlines.

== Career ==
Sahir Ali Bagga started in the music industry as a drummer and later joined the band Jupiters where he met music video singer Jawad Ahmad. He composed music for Ahmed's album and this helped Bagga find his career path, later on, Pakistan Army boosted his career by adopting him as an official singer of National Armed forces after Noor Jehan. He first received recognition and praise for his work and musical arrangements on Pakistan Television produced TV show named Virsa: Heritage Revived (2009–2010) TV season. On this show, he composed music for TV performances of Shafqat Amanat Ali Khan, Rahat Fateh Ali Khan, Azra Jehan, Sanam Marvi and many more performers. This highly popular TV show was hosted by Lahore's socially active personality Yousuf Salahuddin.

He also sang some popular TV dramas OSTs, such as one of the best O Rangreza (Hum TV), Iltija (Ary Digital TV), Khudgharz (ARY Digital), Intezaar (A plus TV) and many more. His recent OST for the TV drama O Rangreza received much recognition and was nominated for Lux Style Awards in 2018. He also sung the Ost of Bharosa Pyar Tera and wrote the lyrics for the OST of the hit drama Khaani. He has also appeared in Coke Studio Pakistan (season 10) in a duet song with Aima Baig. In May 2021, he appeared in an upbeat, Punjabi song titled Badnamiyan, alongside Alizeh Shah.

Sahir Ali Bagga is quoted as saying, "I always want to make music that relates to my land, my culture and my home. Our raags, our beats, our lyrics – these are our own colors. I want to give my fans the kind of music that shows these colors".

== Awards ==
In 2020, the government of Pakistan awarded him the Pride of Performance Award in recognition of his music composition for "Bara Dushman Bana Phirta Hai", a march song originally released in December 2015 by the Inter-Services Public Relations on the first anniversary of 2014 Peshawar school massacre.
