= Barabri Party Pakistan =

Barabri Party Pakistan برابری پارٹی پاکستان
- Urdu name: برابری پارٹی پاکستان
- Abbreviation: BPP
- Chairman: Jawad Ahmad
- Vice Chairman: Dr. Shahnaz Khan
- Founder: Jawad Ahmad
- Founded: 2018
- Headquarters: Johar Town Lahore, Pakistan
- Ideology: Egalitarianism
- Political position: Left-wing
- Colors: Green, Gold, Red
- Slogan: Roti, Khana, Kapra, Makaan, Ghar, Tahafuz, Taleem, Sehat or Rozgaar, Bijli, Pani, Transport, Insaaf, RAYASAAT IN KI ZIMMEDAAR.

Election symbol
- Pen (Qalam)

Party flag

Website
- Barabri Party Pakistan

The Barabri Party Pakistan (Urdu: برابری پارٹی پاکستان abbr. BPP) is a political party founded in Pakistan in 2017 by musician/singer, political activist, social worker and intellectual Jawad Ahmad. The party's name, Barabri, is an Urdu word meaning 'equality' because the fundamental underlying philosophy of the party is equitable distribution of resources and equality of access to opportunities for all citizens of Pakistan regardless of race, religion, ethnicity, nationality or gender.

== Ideology ==
The fundamental underlying ideology of the party is leftist, and socialist, with social ownership, and socialist democracy being some of its main tenets. Equality of access over opportunities and resources for all citizens of Pakistan regardless of race, religion, ethnicity, nationality or gender.

== General elections 2018 ==
BPP fielded 12 candidates for 5 Provincial and 7 National Assembly, including one woman, in 2018 elections, all of them belonging to the middle class, working class and youth, against the political stalwarts in the country. Jawad Ahmad himself challenged Imran Khan, Nawaz Sharif, Maryam Nawaz, Shahid Khaqan Abbasi, Aleem Khan (politician), Altaf Hussain (Pakistani politician), Shehbaz Sharif and Bilawal Bhutto representing the three major political parties in Pakistan, in 2018 elections. He believes that these parties represent the elites in the country and election is a form of business for these parties. Jawad Ahmad further elaborates that ninety-nine percent of Pakistan population belongs to the middle and working class and unless candidates representing this ninety-nine percent of the population enter the parliament to work on people-centric legislation, nothing will change and status quo will keep on existing.

== See also ==
- List of political parties in Pakistan
