= Bushra Farrukh =

Pakistani poet

- Born: 16 February 1957 (age 69); Peshawar, Pakistan
- Occupations: Poet, Announcer
- Writing career
- Language: Urdu, Pashto, Hindko, English
- Notable works: Bohat Gehri Udasi Hai, Adhuri Mohabbat Ka Poora Safar, Ik Qayamat hai lamha e Mojood
- Notable awards: Abasin Arts Council Adabi Award (2017-2018), PTV Award (1998), Best Performance Award (1987 to 1997), Frontier Arts Council Award (gold medal) (1982), Coca-Cola Award (1978)

Bushra Farrukh (Urdu: بشری فارخ; born 16 February 1957) is a Pakistan Urdu-language poet. She was born in Peshawar. She has worked at Pakistan Television and Radio Pakistan as an announcer. An artist hailing from the Khyber Pakhtunkhwa province, she has performed in television and radio programs in four languages: Urdu, Pashto, Hindko and English.

== Career ==
Nine of her poetry collections have been published.

Her professional career includes:

- Pakistan Television (Peshawar Center): Worked at PTV Peshawar Center as an announcer for 10 years and a drama artist for 35 years.
- Radio Pakistan: Worked at Radio Pakistan as an announcer, compare and drama artist for 35 years.
- Women Writers' Forum: Women Writers Forum general secretary for 3 years and chief organizer for one year.
- Business Women Association: Worked at Business Women Association for two years as Public Relations Officer, Institute of Computer Management Sciences (ICMS), and as its the literary wing in-charge for a year.
- She worked on her play "aur hum wafa karte rahe". She was the writer and director of the play.
- Produced a Pushto serial “woona da chinaar”

== Selected works ==
- Bohat Gehri Udasi Hai (Farrukh)
- Adhuri Mohabbat Ka Poora Safar (WTO)
- Ik Qayamat hai lamha e Mojood (an anthology of Urdu poetry)

== Awards and honours ==
- Abasin Arts Council Adabi Award 2017-2018
- Sardar Abdur Rab Nishtar Award (gold medal) 2003–2004
- Hindko World Conference Award 2005
- Bazm-e-Bahar-e-Adab Silver Jubilee Award 2005
- City District Government Award 2004
- Farogh Adabi Award 2004
- Rozan International Literary Award 2003
- Taangh Waseep Award 2000
- Khyber College of Commerce Shield 2000
- Azeem Welfare Society Award 1999
- PTV Award 1998 (Best Performance Award) 1987 to 1997
- Moshiqar-e-Aazam Award 1997
- Agfa Award 1997
- Agfa Award 1996
- Frontier Cultural Club Award 1995
- Frontier Arts Council Award (gold medal) 1995
- Meer Arts Society Award 1986
- Frontier Arts Council Award (gold medal) 1982
- Coca-Cola Award 1978
- Sultani Award 1976
- Pakistan Artists Equity Award 1973

== See also ==
- Urdu poetry
- List of Urdu Poets
- List of Pakistani actresses
