= Mastana Mahi =

- Genre: Drama
- Written by: Sameera Fazal
- Directed by: Roomi Insha
- Starring: Fahad Mustafa; Mehreen Raheel
- Opening theme: Palkein Kyun (sung by Sohail Haider)
- Country of origin: Pakistan
- Original language: Urdu
- No. of episodes: 16

Production
- Producer: Momina Duraid
- Running time: Approx. 40-45 minutes

Original release
- Network: Hum TV
- Release: 26 May – 15 September 2011

Mastana Mahi is a Pakistani drama television series broadcast by Hum TV. Airing on Thursdays, the series premiered on 26 May 2011 and ended its run on 15 September 2011. It stars Fahad Mustafa, Mehreen Raheel and Sajal Aly in the lead roles. The theme song of the drama is sung by Sohail Haider. Mastana Mahi was also broadcast in India by Zindagi, premiering on 6 November 2014.

== Plot ==
An expat girl, Aaleen, gets romantically involved with a man her father's age. Meanwhile, a politician's son, Adal, is forced to marry a child bride, Suhaai. Aaleen marries Mike, and after her miscarriage, she divorces him. Adal loves Aaleen and marries her after telling the truth about his first marriage with Suhaai.

Once they return to Pakistan, the bond between Aaleen and Suhaai becomes stronger with time. After six years, when Suhaai moves to Adal's house after ruksati, Aaleen begins to feel jealous of Suhaai and wants Suhaai to leave Adal. After Suhaai gets pregnant, Aaleen plans to kill her unborn child. Adal discovers Aaleen's evil plan and asks her to leave the house. Suhaai bears a son and asks Aaleen to return. Adal then forgives Aaleen.

However, this relationship between Aaleen and Adal and the relationships of those around them are tested by time.

== Cast ==
- Fahad Mustafa as Adal Soomro
- Mehreen Raheel as Aaleen Mike/ Aaleen Adal Soomro (the second wife of Adal)
- Arisha Razi as young Suhaai
- Sajal Aly as Suhaai Adal Soomro (the first wife of Adal)
- Deepti Gupta as Lilly
- Sakina Samo as Adil's mother
- Mahmood Aslam as Aleen's father
- Saba Hameed as Aleen's mother
- Imran Peerzada as Mike
- Nida Khan as Simran
- Nimra Bucha as Pooja
- Saboor Aly as Fatima Suhaai's friend

== Awards and nominations ==
| Year | Awards | Category | Nominee(s)/ Recipient(s) | Result | Ref. |
|---|---|---|---|---|---|
| 2012 | Lux Style Awards | Best TV Actor - Satellite | Fahad Mustafa | Nominated | |
