= Saya-e-Dewar Bhi Nahi =

Pakistani television series

- Genre: Serial drama
- Based on: Saya-e-Dewar Bhi Nahi by Qaisara Hayat
- Written by: Qaisra Hayat
- Directed by: Shahzad Kashmiri
- Starring: Ahsan Khan; Naveen Waqar; Emmad Irfani
- Opening theme: Singers; Basit Ali; Faiza Mujahid; Lyrics by Sohail Hyder
- Country of origin: Pakistan
- Original language: Urdu
- No. of episodes: 28

Production
- Producer: Momina Duraid

Original release
- Network: Hum TV
- Release: 10 August 2016 – 22 February 2017

Saya-e-Dewar Bhi Nahi (Urdu: سایۂ دیوار بھی نہیں ; lit Not Even the Shadow of a Wall) is a Pakistani drama television series that began to air on Hum TV on 10 August 2016 succeeding Dil-e-Beqarar. It is directed by Shahzad Kashmiri and written by Qaisara Hayat based on her novel of the same name. It stars Ahsan Khan, Naveen Waqar and Emmad Irfani in main roles.

== Plot ==
The story is about a girl named Shehla (Naveen Waqar) as the female protagonist, who was adopted as an infant by Syed Shahab Shah (Jamal Shah). Her father was chief of his tribe and a much honorable man. Shehla was brought up and pampered a lot in his mansion. Shehla grew older and was unaware of the fact that she was adopted. She fell in love with Haider (Ahsan Khan), her cousin and Shahab's nephew and both wanted to marry each other. However, according to the Syed family customs, a Syed man must marry a Syed woman and Shehla was not a Syed girl. Shehla got to know about herself and felt hurt and started doubting her own identity. She became depressed at the fact that her family is not her own. Shahab marries Shehla to one of his friend Mairaj Malik's (Irfan Khoosat) son, Malik Mansoor (Emmad Irfani). Heartbroken at this, Haider marries Tahira (his cousin). Mansoor and his father were corrupt politicians and Mansoor was a psychopath. After he discovered the news about Shehla and Haider, his character turns out to be brutal towards Shehla, beating her daily to the point of bloodshed. Mansoor was in love with his mistress Shiza (Ghana Ali). Shehla got pregnant and gave birth to a daughter and named her Shafaq. The day Shehla gave birth to Shafaq, Mansoor also won the local elections and became a minister, leading him to believe that his daughter is lucky for him. Later on, Mansoor turns out to be a good father but a bad husband. Haider and his wife also had a daughter but his wife Tahira (Sharmeen Ali) died after childbirth. Before she dies for the sake of Haider's happiness, she requests for her daughter to be named Shehla. After ten years Shehla was shown as a mother of three children, while Mansoor was the same who used to abuse his wife. Shela escapes the marriage from Mansoor, leaving her three children:Shafaq (Noor Zafar Khan), Afaaq (Bilal Abbas), Falaq with Mansoor and his parents, of which the youngest daughter Falaq dies whilst left in the care of her siblings, who accidentally overdose her on medication whilst trying to treat her fever.

Shelha moves to a different city and marries a Christian, called Peter. She later gets pregnant with their child, and discovers Peter does not want children and asks her to abort the pregnancy. Shehla refuses to do this and they divorce and she moves out. Later the drama is fast forwarded 15–18 years, and all the children are shown as grown up, with Shelha working as a teacher, Shelha has not taught her son William (Ali Ansari) about religion and what he should believe in. He contemplates joining the Christian Missionary, to which his mother realises that she may not have raised him in a way conducive to Pakistani life. A chance meeting with the now grown up Shelha (Syed Zahra Shah) (Haider's daughter) leads to a meeting with Haider himself. In these days, orphan politician and where hyperman. Haider meets his old love Shehla in Shehla (Jr.)'s college. Soon after Shehla listens that Haider loves Shehla, she starts hating him which starts conflict with her father. In these days, she is supposed to marry Amber's son Asad Ali. Tabbassum is happy by their new meeting but Haider's daughter becomes angry that her father gives extra respect to Shehla. She warns Shehla to not meet Haider from which she fells down and is diagnosed to have a brain tumor. Where Shehla (Jr.) and Haider's relation becomes strained as she was cause of Shehla's condition but she did possible things (apologize from Shehla) from which Haider apologizes her. While Haider gives shelter to Shafaq, as she is difficulty because her father had an assassination attempt on her but she recovered. Afaaq thinks that Shafaq is dead, he blames on his father for killing Shafaq. At that time, Afaaq had married his servant, Rani, whose name is later changed into Seher by Afaaq himself. While, Mansoor says Shiza toe of sandals, on which their relation becomes strained, and she goes in her home, but someone attaches bomb in her car so that it gets blast in front of Shiza but she is at that time not sitting there. She again warns Mansoor that she will kill him on which he asks that what has he done. She leaves the country. Haider is approached by the people of this town in which Mansoor governs and they suggest that he is already a veteran social worker, he should fight in elections versus Mansoor, who in his reign had been corrupt and negligent. Mansoor tries all dirty tactics, trying to sabotage the rallies of Haider and also an assassination attempt but Haider survives, two days before election Mansoor is arrested by police on a FIR issued by Shiza who returned back to Pakistan and is investigated for murder of a journalist involved in exposing murder of Mansoor's secretary (who was the journalist's cousin). Mansoor loses the election and all his close associates abandon him. He is found guilty on murder charges and is sentenced to death, while his daughter Shafaq who had murdered her friend and her brother who conspired to rape her was given a life sentence. Shiza meets and apologizes to Shehla who was in her last moments, and her son William accepts Islam and in a sorrow scene both her children William and Afaaq weep for their deceased mother.

== Cast ==
- Naveen Waqar as Shehla
- Ahsan Khan as Haider
- Emmad Irfani as Malik Mansoor
- Ghana Ali as Shiza
- Noor Zafar Khan as Shafaq
- Bilal Abbas Khan as Afaaq
- Ali Ansari as William
- Naima Khan as Zubaida
- Jamal Shah as Shahab Shah
- Irfan Khoosat as Malik Mairaj
- Shamayel Tareen as Tabassum
- Sonia Khan as Zahra
- Shermeen Ali as Tahira
- Nimra Khan as Seher/Rani
- Hina Altaf as Aainoor
- Zahra Shah as Shehla (young)
- Faseeh Sarda as Sohail
- Sajeeruddin as Johnson
- Munawar Saeed as head of the jirga (Episode 4)

=== Child stars ===
- Eshal as Shafaq

== Production ==
Ahsan Khan, who was choose to play one of the leading roles, shared, "the drama is not based love story of a boy and a girl rather it has religious message beautifully embed into it,". Naveen Waqar was selected to portray the role of Shehla, the female lead, marking a significant milestone in her career that challenged her and fueled her growth as an actress. Emmad Irfani was cast as another lead and drew inspiration for his portrayal from Hollywood legend Jack Nicholson.

The series marked the on-screen comeback of veteran Sonia Khan and the acting debut of Bilal Abbas Khan, who played a supporting role in the series.

== See also ==
- List of programs broadcast by Hum TV
