= Bano (novel) =

1971 novel by Razia Butt

- Author: Razia Butt
- Original title: بانو
- Language: Urdu
- Genres: Romance; Historical fiction
- Set in: British India and Pakistan from 1940s to 1950s
- Publisher: Ferozsons
- Publication date: 1971
- Publication place: Pakistan
- Media type: Print

Bano (Urdu: بانو) is an Urdu language novel by the Pakistani novelist Razia Butt, which is considered one of her best literary works. It is set in the days before and after the Partition of India in Ludhiana, Punjab Province and subsequently, Pakistan. The events of Partition play a central role in the story. The novel is named for its female protagonist, Bano.

== Adaptation ==
The novel has been dramatised for television as Dastaan by Hum TV in 2010 which was directed by Haissam Hussain and produced by Momina Duraid while the character of Bano was played by Sanam Baloch.

== Plot ==
The novel starts with Hassan and Rabia meeting for the first time in years. Expecting a twelve-year-old girl with ponytails, he is flabbergasted to see a grown young woman. Rabia has feelings for him and thus tries to approach him but Hassan is in love with his fiancé Bano, who is thought to have died some years ago. However, Hassan feels a strong physical attraction to Rabia and soon gives in to his lust and approaches her. Rabia, who loves him is delighted and they soon are engaged to be married. Meanwhile, a letter informs him of Bano's whereabouts. Shocked, he goes to receive her from Lahore. Bano and her son arrive at Hassan's home.

Five years ago, at Hassan's aunt Suraiyyah and Bano's brother Saleem's wedding, the two fell for each other hard and got engaged. It was the year 1946 and tensions between Muslims and Hindus had escalated to the point that riots had become frequent from both sides. As Hassan and his mother went to Pindi as he had gotten a job there, partition happened. Bano's home is attacked and no survivors are left except for her and her mother, as they were rescued by two family friends, Rajindar and Gayon Laal. Being avid supporters of the Muslim League they are proud of having made sacrifices for the cause. Bano's mother is soon killed as they are moving to Pakistan in a caravan while Bano is raped.

Nursed to health by a Sikh family, Bano takes the train to Lahore which is unfortunately attacked by rioters. One of them, Basant Singh takes her to his home and marries her by force. However, she does not give up on her religion and her dream to go to Pakistan, even though she forgets everything else, making his blood boil. After spending five dreadful years in Kapurthala with Basanta and his family, Bano, now called Sundar Kaur gets sanctuary when her 'husband' dies. Her close friend Gobandi, a neighbour of Basanta's asks her brother to send Bano to Pakistan. Even though Bano hated her son for being the living proof of her life with Basanta, she is after all his mother and could not bear to leave him and thus took him along.

Coming back to the present, Bano and Hassan reconcile and cry together. Their love had increased after these years of partition but Hassan was haunted by the guilt of hurting Rabia. However, Rabia, seeing Bano's condition backs off but Bano finds out about the engagement from a servant who wanted Hassan and Rabia's union so that she could get some jewelry and clothes. Bano leaves. She is taken in by a poor but happy family. She wanted to work for her country but is fired from every job for being too patriotic and being too honest. She is heartbroken at Pakistan's reality but starts coming back to life. She even starts loving her son Ghulam Ahmed. She spends three years peacefully until one day she is raped by her employer. She completely loses her senses as she thought that no woman would be disrespected in Pakistan.

There is utter chaos in their home as Bano arrives half-naked and kills her son in a fit of madness. She runs to Hassan's home where he was marrying Rabia and demands an explanation. Why did he lie to her that Pakistan would be a pure country where no one is harmed. Why did her and her family's sacrifices go to waste? She soon dies in Hassan's arms and Hassan loses his senses, while Rabia is left to live with the guilt of ruining their lives indirectly, and to take care of her mentally ill husband.

== See also ==
- Aangan (novel)
- Artistic depictions of the partition of India
