= Daniyal Raheal =

Pakistani television actor, director and producer

- Born: 5 January 1983 (age 43); Lahore, Punjab, Pakistan
- Education: Beaconhouse National University, Lahore
- Occupations: Actor; Producer; Director
- Years active: 2010–2024
- Known for: Dastaan
- Spouse: Faryal Mehmood (m. 2020; div. 2021)
- Relatives: Seemi Raheel (mother); Mehreen Raheel (sister)

Daniyal Raheal (in Punjabi and Urdu: دانیال راحیل) is a Pakistani television actor, director and producer.

== Early and personal life ==
The son of veteran actress Seemi Raheel and the brother of actress Mehreen Raheel, after graduating in Film, Theatre & Television from the Beaconhouse National University, Lahore, he started his career with acting in a PTV drama by veteran producer Ayub Khawar.

On 28 May 2020, Raheal married fellow actress Faryal Mehmood. Rumours about their alleged separation began later that year; on 13 December 2020, Mehmood publicly rejected these claims, commenting that she would "like you guys to leave my marriage up to me and @daniyalraheal and focus on issues that are important in your own lives." In August 2021, Mehmood announced that she was currently single confirming their separation.

== Career ==
=== Acting ===
Raheal started his career with amateur theatre in Lahore when he was 17. He rose to fame by playing a supporting role in the critically acclaimed drama serial Dastaan (2010) and a parallel lead in ARY Digital's Silvatein (2013) where he starred opposite Mira Sethi.

=== Direction and production ===
As a director and producer he has done some commercials and ad campaigns.

== Filmography ==
=== Television series ===
Year	Title	Role	Network	Notes
2010	Dastaan	Faheem	Hum TV	Supporting role
2013	Silvatein	Bilal	ARY Digital	Leading role
2015	Duaa	Ashar	Geo Entertainment	Leading role
2015	Maana Ka Gharana	Shehriyar	Hum TV	Supporting role
2016	Ab Kar Meri Rafugari	Jazib	ARY Digital	Leading role
2016	Kitni Girhain Baaki Hain (season 2)	Jameel	Hum TV	Episode 29
2018	Ki Jaana Main Kaun	Shehroze	Hum TV	Supporting role
2018	Teri Meri Kahani	Hamza	Hum TV	Supporting role
2018	Ustani Jee	Shehwar's brother	Hum TV	Episode 5
2018	Baandi	Fahran	Hum TV	Supporting role
2023–2024	Serial Killer	SP Shahzain	Green Entertainment	Supporting role

=== Films ===
Year	Film	Role	Director	Notes	Ref.
2014	O21	Jami	Jami	Supporting role	
2018	Motorcycle Girl	Ali	Adnan Sarwar	Supporting role	
2024	Umro Ayyar - A New Beginning	Babar	Azfar Jafri	Supporting role	
