= Behadd =

- Official poster of the telefilm released by Hum TV.
- Genre: Drama
- Screenplay by: Umera Ahmad
- Directed by: Asim Raza
- Starring: Fawad Khan; Nadia Jamil; Sajal Ali
- Theme music composer: Fawad Khan; Hasil Qureshi
- Country of origin: Pakistan
- Original language: Urdu

Production
- Producer: Momina Duraid
- Cinematography: Suleman Razzaq
- Editors: Kashif Ahmad; Wasim
- Running time: 128 minutes
- Production company: Momina Duraid Productions

Original release
- Network: Hum TV
- Release: 8 June 2013

Behadd (Urdu: بے حد; English: Boundless) is a 2013 Pakistani drama film directed by Asim Raza, produced by Momina Duraid, and written by Umera Ahmad. The telefilm stars Fawad Khan, Nadia Jamil, Sajal Ali in pivotal roles with Nadia Afgan, Adnan Siddiqui, Adnan Jaffar and Shamoon Abbasi. Behadd premiered on 23 February 2013 on Hum TV. It was also aired in India on Zindagi, premiering on 30 August 2014.

Behadd reflects upon the relationship dynamics of a parent and a child, and shows how their love for one another becomes the cause of their heartache and reflects on selfless and selfish love. Behadd received a Hum Award for Best Television Film at 2nd Hum Awards.

== Plot ==
The story revolves around Masooma, a.k.a. Mo (Nadia Jamil), a working woman and single mother who lives with her fifteen-year-old daughter Maha (Sajal Ali). After losing her husband in a road accident, Maha becomes Masooma's sole reason for existence; Maha grows into an introvert and is highly possessive of her mother.

One day, Masooma bumps into her best friend's younger brother, Jamal Ahmad, a.k.a. Jo (Fawad Khan). Jamal is Masooma's childhood friend and a divorcee. He visits Masooma's house for dinner and gets along well with Maha. Masooma is surprised as Maha usually doesn't warm up quickly to people. Jo's sister, Poppy (Nausheen), asks Masooma to find a girl for Jo, as she thinks Jo is very young and should remarry. Masooma introduces Shaista (Hira Tareen) to Jo at lunch, where Jo behaves carelessly and shows no interest in the proposal.

Jo starts spending a lot of time with Masooma and Maha, the latter warming up to him even more. Jo soon realises his love for Mo, and waits for the perfect moment to propose to Masooma, leaving her shocked. She refuses as she is a single mother five years older than him. Masooma also feels that Maha will never adjust to having a new father. However, Jo asks her to reconsider her decision as he genuinely loves and respects her and considers Maha, his daughter. Masooma's friend Shafaq (Nadia Afgan) makes her realise that she will never get a better husband than Jo. Shafaq assures her that Jo can be the father figure in Maha's life.

Masooma tells Maha about Jo's proposal and tells her they need someone like Jo in their lives. He has all the qualities of a good companion and a great person. Masooma also says that she will not accept the proposal if Maha is uncomfortable. Though a little taken aback by the proposal, Maha gives her consent to the marriage.

A few days later, Masooma asks Jamal to pick Maha up from school as she is busy with work. When she returns, she finds Maha screaming, seemingly due to Jamal sexually harassing her. Masooma is left guilt-ridden and heartbroken, and she breaks up with Jamal. After six months, Masooma decides to send Maha to London for higher studies, but Maha refuses to go. Maha confides in Shafaq that she framed Jamal because Masooma was falling in love with him, and she had become insecure about losing her mother.

Shafaq tells Maha the importance of Jamal in their lives. Maha then leaves Shafaq's house to apologise to Jamal and tells him why she accused him. Jamal tells her that it is up to her and Masooma to decide whether she wants him in their lives. He also reveals that Masooma is aware of the truth. Jamal explains that after two weeks of the incident, Masooma saw CCTV footage from that day and realised that Jamal was innocent.

Masooma secretly watches Maha apologise to Jamal; both mother and daughter become emotional and hug each other.

== Cast ==
=== Principal Cast ===
- Fawad Khan as Jamal "Jo" Ahmed
- Nadia Jamil as Masooma "Mo" Jamal
- Sajal Ali as Maha
- Nadia Afgan as Shafaq
- Nasheen Masud as Popi "Po" Masood
- Rahma Saleem as Fareena
- Sana Javed as Laiba (Cameo)
- Aiman Khan as Sara
- Zainab Raza as Maha's childhood
- Maryam Raza as Maha's school friend

=== Special Appearance ===
- Adnan Siddiqui as Hassan (Masooma's husband)
- Adnan Jaffar as Shafaq's husband
- Shamoon Abbasi as Masooma's boss
- Hira Tareen as Shaista (Jo's proposal)

== Production ==
In 2013, Asim Raza announced in an interview with Daily Times that he would mark his directional debut with Behadd which will be a television film, better known as a 'telefilm' in Pakistan. He clarified that it will be "a long play with substance and will be at par with a telefilm." In mid-2013 casting of the telefilm was confirmed with the cast of Fawad Khan, Nadia Jamil, Sajjal Ali and Nadia Afgan in central roles, while Adnan Siddiqui, Adnan Jaffar and Shamoon Abbasi joined the cast for supporting roles.

=== Filming ===
Filming began on 21 April 2013 in Karachi, Sindh. The shooting lasted a month and post-production was completed before 28 May 2013.

=== Music ===
The Title song of Behadd known as the Original Soundtrack was given by the music band Kaavish. It was produced, written and composed by Jaffer Zaidi and Maaz Maudood while one song was taken from season two of Coke Studio Pakistan sung and penned down by Zeb and Haniya and produced by Rohail Hyatt. The background score for the film was given by Fawad Khan himself along with Hasil Qureshi.

==== Track listing ====
All lyrics are written by Jaffer Zaidi, Zeb and Haniya; all music is composed by Jaffer Zaidi, Maaz Maudood and Rohail Hayat.

No.	Title	Artist(s)	Length
1.	"Haulay Haulay Se"	Jaffer Zaidi	5:04
2.	"Chal Diye"	Zebunnisa Humayun Bangash; Haniya Aslam	5:48

== Reception ==
=== Release ===
The film debuted on Hum TV on 8 June 2013, at 9:10 p.m., and had a later on-airing at Zee Zindagi on 30 August 2014. Hum TV also held a red carpet premier for Behadd.

In April 2020, Hum TV uploaded it on its official YouTube channel. It is also available under Zee Zindagi on the ZEE5 app.

=== Critical response ===
The film received praise for Asim Raza's direction, Umera Ahmad's story and successful transmission of the story into a play, acting (particularly that of Fawad Khan, Nadia Jamil, Sajjal Ali and Nadia Afgan), drama, moral messages and production values.

Despite strong positive reviews, there was much speculation that Behadd follows the same plot as Hasina Moin's 1980 PTV classic story Gudiya – (Doll).

=== Accolades ===
For Awarded Year	Year	Ceremony	Category	Recipient(s)
2013	May 25, 2014	Hum Awards	Hum Award for Best Television Film	Momina Duraid
2014	Jan 11, 2014	4th Pakistan Media Awards	Best Television Film	Momina Duraid

== See also ==
- 2013 in Pakistani television
- List of programs broadcast by Hum TV
