= Nadia Jamil =

Pakistani actress and host (born 1972)

- نادیہ جمیل
- Born: Nadia Fazal Jamil; 13 October 1972 (age 53); London, England
- Citizenship: United Kingdom; Pakistan
- Education: Convent of Jesus and Mary, Lahore
- Alma mater: Hampshire College; Allegheny College; Globe Theatre
- Occupations: Actress; Host; Writer; Activist
- Years active: 1995-present
- Spouse: Ali Pervaiz
- Children: 2
- Website: njlahori.com

Nadia Jamil (Urdu: نادیہ جمیل) (Born: 13 October 1972) is a British Pakistani actress and host. Jamil started her career in late 1990s and has appeared in several television productions since then. Besides television, she has worked in theater as well. Her television appearances include Dhoop Mein Sawan (1998), Mere Paas Paas (2005), Meri Jaan (2009), Behadd (2013) and Damsa (2019). Her accolades include three nominations of Lux Style Awards.

== Early life and education ==
Jamil was born in London on 13 October 1972, but moved to Lahore when she was nine. She attended the school of Convent of Jesus and Mary, Lahore. She holds a Master of English degree in literature.

Jamil completed a bachelor's in drama and creative writing at Hampshire College, US. She also studied at Allegheny College. She completed her international fellowship at the Globe Theatre, London.

== Career ==
Jamil has been a Pakistani actress and host for the past two decades. Jamil started her career in the 1990s with Mehreen Jabbar's directed Putli Ghar.

In 1999, Jamil played a murder planner in Jabbar's directed Chaal, an adaptation of Dial M for Murder.

Jamil is a trustee of Sunjan Nagar, which is Raza Kazim’s school for financially-deprived girls. She performed a theatre project with them at Al-Hamra. She also serves as an ambassador for Girl Rising, a project which raises awareness about girls' education. She teaches theatre and drama and is working on a few projects with institutes like Oxford University Press and Aitchison, Kids Campus.

== Personal life ==
She is married to Ali Pervaiz and is mother to two sons, Rakae and Mir Vali.

In April 2020, Jamil was diagnosed with stage 1 breast cancer/grade 3 tumor. She underwent successful surgery soon afterwards and by August was out of danger.

Jamil has worked in the cancer awareness campaign video "Alvida".

== Filmography ==
=== Television ===
Year	Title	Role	Network	Notes	Ref.
1996	Putli Ghar		PTV	Telefilm	
1996	Jaane Anjaane		PTV		
1997	Beauty Parlor		PTV	Long Play	
1997	Kali Shalwaar		PTV	Long Play	
1997	Family Front	Nadia	PTV		
1998	Dhoop Mein Sawan	Saba	PTV	Miniseries	
1999	Chaal	Zahra	PTV	Telefilm	
2000	Aur Zindagi Badalti Hai	Anna	PTV		
2001	Kahaniyan	Various			
2002	Raat Chali Hai Jhoom Ke	Fareeha Naz		Telefilm	
2005	Mere Paas Paas	Emaan	Hum TV		
2008	The Ghost	Ayeza Farooqi	Hum TV		
2009	Meri Jaan		Hum TV		
2009	Jago Dunya	Host	Dunya News	Morning Show	
2013	Durr-e-Shehwar	Shandana	Hum TV		
2013	Behadd	Masooma "Mo" Jamal	Hum TV	Telefilm	
2014	Lorilei	Lorilei Guillory		Theater play	
2017	Mujhay Jeenay Do	Yasmeen	Urdu 1		
2019	Damsa	Areeja	ARY Digital		
2021	Jo Bichar Gaye	Shabnam Anwar	Geo Entertainment		
2023	Khushboo Mein Basay Khat	Adeela Ahmed	Hum TV		
2024	Faraar	Shakeela Chaudhary	Green Entertainment		

== Awards and nominations ==
Year	Ceremony	Category	Project	Result	Ref(s)
2002	1st Lux Style Awards	Best TV Actress		Nominated	
2003	2nd Lux Style Awards	Best TV Actress	Faisla	Nominated	
2006	5th Lux Style Awards	Best TV Actress (Satellite)	Mere Paas Paas	Nominated	
2025	10th Hum Awards	Best Supporting Actress	Khushboo Mein Basay Khat	Won	
2026	6th Hum Women Leaders Awards	Kashmir Golden Plate of Excellence		Won	
