= Saiqa (TV series) =

Pakistani television series

- Saiqa title screen
- Genre: Soap opera Romance; Family
- Created by: Moomal Productions
- Written by: Moomal Shunaid
- Directed by: Asim Ali
- Starring: Ahsan Khan; Ayesha Sana; Juggan Kazim; Madiha Iftikhar; Sheema Kermani
- Country of origin: Pakistan
- No. of episodes: 56

Production
- Executive producer: Momina Duraid
- Production locations: Karachi, Pakistan, Murree
- Running time: 45–50 minutes

Original release
- Network: Hum TV
- Release: 19 January – 27 May 2009

Saiqa (Urdu: صاعقہ, lit. 'lightning') is a Pakistani television soap opera written by Moomal Shunaid and directed by Asim Ali which aired on Hum TV. Based on Razia Butt's famous novel of the same name, Saiqa is a mafia story with all the cliché twists, turns, lynching and manipulations. Shot on locations of Murree and Nathiagali, this dark story spans two generations.

The show was selected to air on Hum Europe Monday to Thursday from 6 October 2016 at 9pm.

== Plot ==
Saiqa is a love story with multiple twists, turns and manipulations. Shot on the locations of Murree and Nathiagali, this is a love story spanning two generations. The story focuses on Naaji and Tahir. Naaji is a village girl; while Tahir is an aristocrat who falls in love with and wants to marry her. Tahir is already engaged to Fauzia. His family does not want him to marry Naaji, but he does so. Naaji attempts suicide because of Fauzia. Tahir also dies after hearing of Naaji's reported death. Tahir and Naaji have a daughter, Saiqa. She grows up in the hateful atmosphere of her father's family mansion, with everybody insulting her at every step, and plotting to get rid of her and her mother. Rehan at the beginning hates Saiqa like every other person in the family but later he realises that he loves her. Sumaira (Madiha Iftikhar, Saiqa's cousin and Fauzia's daughter) loves Rehan and is about to marry him but hates Saiqa even more when she hears that Rehan loves Saiqa. The story takes an interesting turn in the end.

== Cast ==
- Sarwat Gilani as Naaji
  - Sheema Kermani as Old Naaji
- Mikaal Zulfiqar as Tahir
- Juggan Kazim as Saiqa
- Ahsan Khan as Rehan
- Mahjabeen as Fouzia
- Shamim Hilaly as Daadi Huzoor
- Khayyam Sarhadi as Abba Huzoor
- Ali Afzal as Azhar
- Ayesha Sana as Sadia
- Madiha Iftikhar as Sumaira
- Faiq Khan as Asad
- Hassan Ahmed as Fakhar
- Osama Muhammad Khalid as Abaq

== Production ==
Saiqa was based on Razia Butt's novel of the same name, and was the second adaptation of the novel after the 1968 film of the same name.

It was shot on locations of Murree and Nathiagali.
