= Sonia Khan =

Pakistani film and television actress

- Born: Sonia Khan; 23 September 1968 (age 57); Lahore, Punjab, Pakistan
- Occupations: Actress, poet, fashion designer
- Years active: 1983–present
- Spouse: Tariq Mir
- Children: Maria Khan (Daughter); Sahib Mir (Son); Rahima Mir (Daughter); Sumayya Mir (Daughter)

Sonia Khan is a Pakistani film and television actress. She has worked in Urdu, Punjabi, Sindhi and Pashto films.

== Personal life ==
Her first marriage was to film actor Arslan Jawad (Babar Khan) in 1988, which ended in divorce. She got married secondly to Tariq Mir whom she first met during the shooting of a drama. According to him, their first meeting consisted of a detailed conversation but neither of them had any idea that they would get married later.

== Career ==
Her family did not belong to showbiz. One of her cousins, Hina Khan, married the actor, Rangeela. That led Sonia to enter showbiz. She was 7 that time. She and Rangeela were neighbours. After marriage, the two houses merged into one, where film shootings were common. Renowned artists, directors, and producers would visit her home. During the late 1970s, whenever child actors were required for any movie scene, Rangeela would take her to shoot along with other children.

During the late 1970s, she marked her entry as a child star; in the 1980s, she signed 12 films during her first-ever film shooting. During the first phase of her acting career spanning a little over a decade (1982 -1993), Sonia worked in 70 Urdu and Punjabi films. She also worked as an actress and model in various serials and long-plays of PTV Lahore and Quetta centres, TV commercials, and theatre.

She left Lollywood at the peak of her career to marry Tariq Mir and later relocated to Norway, where she established a welfare organization along with her participation in domestic tasks. She also tried her luck in dress and jewelry designing. She has also authored a book, Aadhi Sadi Mein Kitni Sadiyaan.

In 2016, she made her comeback as a television actress after fifteen years with a drama serial Saya-e-Dewar Bhi Nahi (2016).

== Filmography ==
=== Movies ===
- Do Bheege Badan
- Direct Hawaldar
- Dhanak
- Teri Bahon Main
- Haseeno ki Barat
- Chambeli
- Sahiba
- Iqraar
- Sapni
- Shehnai
- Aag
- Jeet
- Pyar Tera Mera

=== TV plays ===
- Suraj Ke Sath Sath (PTV)
- Khuwahish (PTV)
- Madar (PTV)
- Rozan (PTV)
- Saya-e-Dewar Bhi Nahi /2016 (Hum TV)
- Dil e Beqrar 2018 (A Plus TV)
- Skitten Snø 2019 Norwegian national TV (NRK)

=== Telefilms ===
- Sahil 2006 (Indus TV)

=== Books ===
* Aadhi Sadi mein kitni sadian (Poetry Book) (آدھی صدی میں کتنی صدیاں (شاعری کی کتاب
