= Mehreen Raheel =

Pakistani actress, model

- Born: Lahore, Punjab, Pakistan
- Occupations: Model, Actor, Host
- Years active: 2007 - Present
- Relatives: Simi Raheal (mother); Daniyal Raheel (brother); Faryal Mehmood (sister-in-law)

Mehreen Raheel (Urdu, Punjabi: مہرین راحیل) is a Pakistani model, actress, managing director of her family company R Vision and host who appears in Pakistani films and serials.

She is best known for portraying the main leads in Meri Zaat Zarra-e-Benishan, Dastaan, Mastana Mahi, Ashk, and Zindagi Gulzar Hai. She made her film debut in Jawad Ahmad's Virsa (2010). In 2013, she appeared in Tamanna directed by British director Steven Dean Moore.

== Early life ==
Raheel is the daughter of actress and social activist Seemi Raheel. Her brother Daniyal Raheel is a model-turned-actor as well. She studied at Lahore Grammar School and Lahore College of Arts and Sciences then she went to London for a diploma in Dance, Drama, and Scriptwriting.

== Career ==
=== Modeling ===
Raheel started her career as a Model when she was 8 years old. She has appeared in commercials for ICI, Head and Shoulders, Pantene, Lipton, Telenor, Ufone, PTCL, and Sooper Biscuit.

=== Film and television ===
Raheel started her acting career with Ajnabee Rastay in which she portrayed a minor character. She then appeared in Gardish, 3 Bata 3, Kothi No. 156, Meri Zaat Zarra-e-Benishan, Dastaan, Mujhey Hai Hukum-e-Azan, Kabhi Aye Naa Judai, Mastana Mahi, Ashk and Adha Din Aur Puri Raat. She was also nominated for Best Actress at the Lux Style Awards for her role in Kabhi Aye Na Judaai.

From 2013 onwards Raheel played the role of Madiha in the telenovela Ashk and in another blockbuster serial Zindagi Gulzar Hai, she played Asmaara, which aired on Hum TV.

Raheel made her film debut in Jawad Ahmad's Virsa opposite Indian actor Arya Babbar. Her second film Tamanna directed by a British director Steven Dean Moore opposite Salman Shahid.

She is currently seen in Hum TV serial Halki Si Khalish.

== Humanitarian work ==
Raheel travelled to India as an Ambassador for the Standard Chartered Fundraising Marathon. She has worked in Thailand with young children and in raising money to fund education. She takes part in humanitarian activities in Pakistan.

== Filmography ==
Film
Year	Film	Role	Additional Notes
2010	Virsa	Mahi	Indo-Pak film
2014	Tamanna	Mehreen	
2017	Freedom Sound	Angelina	Delayed
Drama
Year	Title	Role	Additional Notes
2001	Hawa Pe Raqs	Tania	
2004	Saiban Sheeshay Ka	Deema	
2005	Khayal	Shazma	
2007	Teen Bata Teen	Fiza	
2007	Sirf Tumhare Liye		
2007	Ajnabee Rastay	Ayesha	
2007	Gardish	Khirad	
2008	Kothi No. 156	Mehreen	
2009	Mujhay Hai Hukum-e-Azan	Nafisa	
2009	Meri Zaat Zarra-e-Benishan	Mahroosh	
2010	Dastaan	Rabia	
2010	Kabhi Aye Naa Judai	Saba	
2011	Mastana Mahi	Aleen	
2012	Mahi Ayega	Mehreen	
2012	Ashk	Madiha	
2012	Adha Din Aur Puri Raat	Esha	
2012	Zindagi Gulzar Hai	Aasmara	
2013	Daagh-e-Nidamat	Iram	
2013	Tere Pyar Ke Bharose	Meera	
2013	Dil E Dangal	Aiza	
2013	Halki Si Khalish	Rabia	
2014	Gham-e-Dil	Sana	
2014	Kahani Raima Aur Manahil Ki	Raima	
2014	Hamaray Ustaad	Herself	
2015	Tum Mere Kya Ho		
2017	Mujhay Jeenay Do	Shahina	
Telefilm
Year	Title	Role	Additional Notes
2013	Dil Dangal		
Hosting
Year	Events	Co-Host	Additional Notes
2011	Harri Mirchain	Jawad	
Reality Shows
Year	Title	Role	Additional Notes
2013	Kurkure Off Season 2	Herself	
Morning/Chat Shows Appearance
Year	Title	Role	Additional Notes
2011	Morning with Hum	Herself	
2013	Good Morning Pakistan	Herself	
2013	Zindagi Gulzar Hai Live Transmission	Herself	

== Awards ==
Year	Award	Category	Serial	Character	Result
2008	Lux Style Awards	Best Television Actress (Terrestrial)	Kabhi Aye Naa Judai	Saba	Nominated
2013	Veet Celebration of Beauty Awards	Best Smile		Herself	Nominated
2014	Lux Style Awards	Best Television Actress (Terrestrial)	Dhag-e-Nadamat	Rabia	Nominated
