= Hina Shaheen =

Pakistani actress

- Born: Hina Shaheen; 13 February 1971 (age 55); Haveli Lakha, Punjab, Pakistan
- Other name: Henna Shaheen
- Education: Lahore College of Commerce
- Occupations: Actress; Stage actress; Dancer; Comedian
- Years active: 1989 - present
- Children: 2

Hina Shaheen (born 13 February 1971) is a Pakistani television, film, and stage actress.

== Early life ==
Hina was born on 13 February 1971 in Lahore, Punjab, Pakistan. She graduated with a degree in Commerce from the Lahore College of Commerce.

== Career ==
=== Acting ===
She began her career as a television actress and acted in a few TV serials in the late 1980s and early 1990s on Pakistan Television Corporation. She has also worked with Ad producer/Director Masood Rizvi brother of famous film director Saeed Rizvi. Afterward, she turned to the Film industry and acted in a few films. Her debut film, Dil (1991), featured her alongside Reema and Shan, however but she did not achieve significant success and was primarily cast in supporting and villain roles. After failing to get leading roles in film, she turned to stage dramas. Her stage performances brought her much-needed fame. Shaheen is only working in stage dramas these days.

Hina Shaheen gained significant popularity due to her highly successful dance performances in stage plays. She acted in a large number of stage plays and earned fame from it. People like her dances very much and come to see her dance in stage dramas. She performed in Punjabi theater in Lahore and other cities of Punjab. In 2009 due to her fame in stage dramas, she got a role in Saleem Bajwa's movie Channa Sachi Muchi starring Saima, Moammar Rana, and Baber Ali.

== Filmography ==
=== Television ===
Year	Title	Role	Network
1989	Neelay Hath	Wakeel	PTV
1992	Wisaal	Seeta	PTV
1993	Khuwahish	Ms. Rozi	PTV
1994	Lawrence Of Thalebia	Zangi	PTV
1994	Paharron Ki Burf	Bhikaran	PTV

=== Film ===
Year	Film	Language
1991	Riaz Gujjar	Punjabi
1991	Dil	Urdu / Punjabi
1992	Baghi	Sindhi
1992	Police Story	Urdu
1992	Ishq Rehna Sada	Urdu
1992	Koday Shah	Punjabi
1992	Dosti	Urdu
1993	Purana Pappi	Punjabi
1995	Mundra	Punjabi
1995	Jeenay Do	Urdu
2010	Channa Sachi Muchi	Punjabi
