= Saiqa (film) =

1968 Pakistani Urdu film

- صاعقہ
- Directed by: Laeeq Akhtar
- Screenplay by: Masroor Anwar
- Story by: Razia Butt
- Based on: Saiqa by Razia Butt
- Produced by: Shamim Ara
- Starring: Shamim Ara; Mohammad Ali; Darpan; Lehri; Zamurrad; Sabira Sultana; Ragni; Talish; Nighat Sultana; Qavi; Nabeela
- Cinematography: Kamran Mirza
- Music by: Nisar Bazmi
- Production company: Shamim Ara Productions
- Release date: 13 September 1968
- Country: Pakistan
- Language: Urdu

Saiqa is a 1968 Pakistani Urdu romantic film directed by Laeeq Akhtar and produced by Shamim Ara in her debut production under Shamim Ara Productions. The film was based on Razia Butt's novel by the same name. The lead cast included Shamim Ara, Mohammad Ali, Darpan, Lehri, and Zamurrad.

Saiqa is considered as one of the best performances of Ara, winning her a Nigar Award for Best Actress also. Collectively, the film received 9 Nigar Awards in different categories including "Best Film".

== Plot ==
The protagonist of the film is Saiqa, a twenty-year-old orphan girl who lives in a palace with her grandmother, aunts, and uncle. The palace, however, is a horrible place for her because she is treated badly due to her parents' deeds. Her distant aunt Anjum Ara, who visits occasionally, and her uncle Fakhr, who does not overtly express his affection for her because of his wife, are the only people who truly adore her.

Saiqa secretly loves her most annoying cousin Rehan, but he likes his other cousin. The superstitious adults with hate-filled hearts have misled Rehan and other kids in the palace into thinking that Saiqa's presence is a curse. Finally, Saiqa succeeds in convincing Rehan about her true love for him.

== Cast ==
- Shamim Ara as Saiqa
- Mohammad Ali as Rehan
- Darpan
- Lehri
- Zamurrad
- Ragni
- Nabeela
- Sabira Sultana
- Nighat Sultana
- Talish
- Qavi
- Asad Jafri
- Shakir
- Chham Chham
- Klawati
- M.D. Sheikh
- M.A. Rasheed

== Music and soundtracks ==
The music of the film was composed by Nisar Bazmi and the songs were written by Masroor Anwar:

- A Baharo, Gawah Rehna, A Nazaaro, Gawah Rehna — Singer(s): Ahmad Rushdi, Mala
- Aaja Teray Pyar Mein Hay Dil Be-Qarar — Singer: Runa Laila
- Husn Ka Jalwa Bijli Ban Kar Kab Kis Par Gir Jaye — Singer(s): Mala, Naseem Begum
- Ik Sitam Aur Meri Jan, Abhi Jan Baqi Hay — Singer: Mehdi Hassan
- Jo Hamguzar Rahay Hayn, Woh Zindagi To Nahin — Singer: Mala
- Teri Tasvir Mein Jo Baat Hay, Woh Tujh Mein Kahan — Singer: Mala

== Production ==
The film was based on Razia Butt's best-seller Saiqa. The filming took place in Swat.

== Release and box office ==
Saiqa was released on 13 September 1968.

== Awards ==
Saiqa received 9 Nigar Awards in the following categories:

Category	Awardee
Best film of 1968	Shamim Ara
Best actress	Shamim Ara
Best script writer	Razia Butt
Best screenplay	Masroor Anwar
Best actor	Mohammad Ali
Best comedian	Lehri
Best lyricist	Masroor Anwar
Best male playback singer	Mehdi Hassan
Best musician	Nisar Bazmi
