= Jawad Ahmad =

Pakistani pop singer and musician

Jawad Ahmad جواد احمد TI
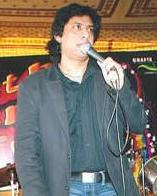
- Jawad Ahmed performing at Punjab College, Gujrat

Background information
- Born: 29 September 1970 (age 56)
- Origin: Lahore, Punjab, Pakistan
- Genres: Pop; Bhangra; Sufi music
- Occupations: Singer; Music director Politician
- Instruments: Vocals; Guitar
- Years active: 2000 – present
- Label: Coke Studio
- Formerly of: Jupiters
- Political party: BPP (2018-present)
- Awards: see below

Jawad Ahmad is a Pakistani pop singer and musician turned politician.

Jawad Ahmad is currently chairman of Barabri Party Pakistan, a leftist political party that he founded in 2017.

== Early life and education ==
Jawad Ahmad was born on 29 September 1970 in Lahore, Punjab into a Kashmiri family who immigrated to Pakistan after independence, with both his parents being college professors teaching Political Science. His father Tauqeer Ahmad Shaikh, who was a professor at the Government College University, Lahore, died in November 2023; Jawad has three siblings, a sister and two brothers.

Jawad Ahmad received a degree in Mechanical Engineering from the University of Engineering and Technology (UET), Lahore. During his student days at the UET, he was part of many of its societies, including the music society and the literature society.

== Music career ==
=== Jupiters with Ali Azmat ===
While at university, he used to participate in the musical and literary societies of the university. He later became a member of the Lahore-based pop musical band, Jupiters, along with another famous pop singer, Ali Azmat. This musical group later disbanded and Jawad decided to pursue a solo career.

=== Solo career ===
Jawad got fame with his solo song, Allah Meray Dil Kay Ander, which showcased his fondness for Sufism.

While he has received no formal education in music, most of his songs are written and composed by him. He draws inspiration from a diverse range of musical personalities such as Ustad Amanat Ali Khan, Mehdi Hassan, Ustad Salamat Ali Khan, Tufail Niazi, Pathanay Khan, Hamid Ali Bela, Madam Noor Jehan, Lata Mangeshkar, Asha Bhosle, Nusrat Fateh Ali Khan, Kishore Kumar, Eagles, Elvis Presley, Mohammed Rafi.

So far, Jawad Ahmad has established his presence in the music industry through three solo albums, and several drama OSTs.

==== Bollywood ====
His song "Bin Tere Kya Hai Jeena" was recreated for the Hindi movie Woh Lamhe... (2006).

== Political career ==
In May 2017, Jawad launched the leftist political party Barabri. The party fielded 14 candidates in the 2018 elections, with Jawad himself contesting 3 seats against the chiefs of the three major political parties in the country - Imran Khan of PTI, Shahbaz Sharif of PML-N, and Bilawal Bhutto Zardari of PPP, Shahid Khaqan Abbasi of AP, and Aleem Khan of IPP. The party did not win any seats.

Ahead of the 2024 elections, his party was delisted for failing to conduct intra-party elections and was not eligible to contest any seat.

== Other work ==
=== Social work ===
In 2002, he was appointed as the ambassador of Pakistan for the eradication of polio by Pakistan's Ministry of Health and the UNICEF. He participated in the British Council's Beyond Borders project in order to raise awareness about the dangers of drug addiction, producing a song called Tum Abhi To Aa Kar to illustrate the social impact of drug use. He sang another social awareness song Taaleem Sub Kay Liey for a project funded by USAID.

Another turf is a program against illiteracy, which he has been exploring. In conjunction with this, he is running ten schools in the least developed areas of Pakistan under the Taleem for All program.

=== Television work ===
Jawad Ahmad has done hosting for television and has performed for morale boosting of Pakistani soldiers. He also did the documentary series Har Dam Tayyar for the Pakistan Armed Forces in 2002 including:

- Sons of the Soil for Pakistan Army
- Power of the Sea for Pakistan Navy
- Flying Tigers for Pakistan Air Force

== Controversies ==
=== 2025 electricity theft allegations ===
In January 2025, the Lahore Electric Supply Company (LESCO) accused Jawad and his wife of electricity theft at a business premises in Johar Town, Lahore. LESCO officials filed a police report alleging that Jawad assaulted their staff during a meter inspection. Jawad denied the allegations, describing the case as "politically motivated" and a conspiracy against his political career.

== Discography ==
=== Albums ===
| Year | Title |
|---|---|
| 2000 | Bol Tujhay Kya Chahiye |
| 2001 | Ucchayan Majajan Aali |
| 2003 | Jind Jan Sohnian |
| 2013 | Love, Life, Revolution |

=== Popular songs ===
| Title | Note |
|---|---|
| Tum Jeeto Ya Haaro | |
| Mehndi Ki Yeh Raat | Soundtrack of the 2003 drama Mehndi |
| Allah Meray Dil Kay Ander | |
| Tu Hi Dildar Hai | |
| Banto Di Jaan Haan Main | |
| Ucchayan Majajan Wali | |
| Dosti | |
| Aasman Se Uncha | |
| Aj Dharti Ko Rang De | Album 2: Mehndi |
| Bin Tere Kya Hai Jeena | Soundtrack of the 2006 Hindi movie Woh Lamhe |
| O Kendi Ae | |
| Dholna | |

== Filmography ==
- Pakistani film Moosa Khan (2001) (music and lyrics by Jawad Ahmad)
- Pakistani film Mein Ek Din Laut Kay Aaoon Ga (2007) (music and lyrics by Jawad Ahmad)
- Pakistani and Indian joint-venture film Virsa (2010) (music arranged by Jawad Ahmad)

== Awards and nominations ==
| Year | Award | Category | Awarding Body | Result |
|---|---|---|---|---|
| 2003 | Lux Style Award Best Singer 2003 | Best Singer | Lux Style Award | Nominated |
| 2006 | Sitara-e-Esar Award | Services in rehabilitation of the earthquake victims | Government of Pakistan | Won |
| 2006 | Tamgha-e-Imtiaz (Medal of Distinction) | Acknowledging the services of Jawad Ahmad in the field of music | Government of Pakistan | Won |
| 2002 | Polio Eradication Ambassador Award | Ambassador for Polio Eradication by the Ministry of Health and UNICEF | Government of Pakistan | Won |
| 2007 | Indus Music Awards | Indus Music's Best Bhangra Song Award | Indus Music Awards | Won |
| 2016: | Human Rights Award conferred by the President of Pakistan. [1, 2] | | Government of Pakistan | style="background: #9EFF9E; color: #000; vertical-align: middle; text-align: center; " class="yes table-yes2 notheme"|Won |
