= List of awards and nominations received by Fawad Khan =

Fawad Khan awards and nominations
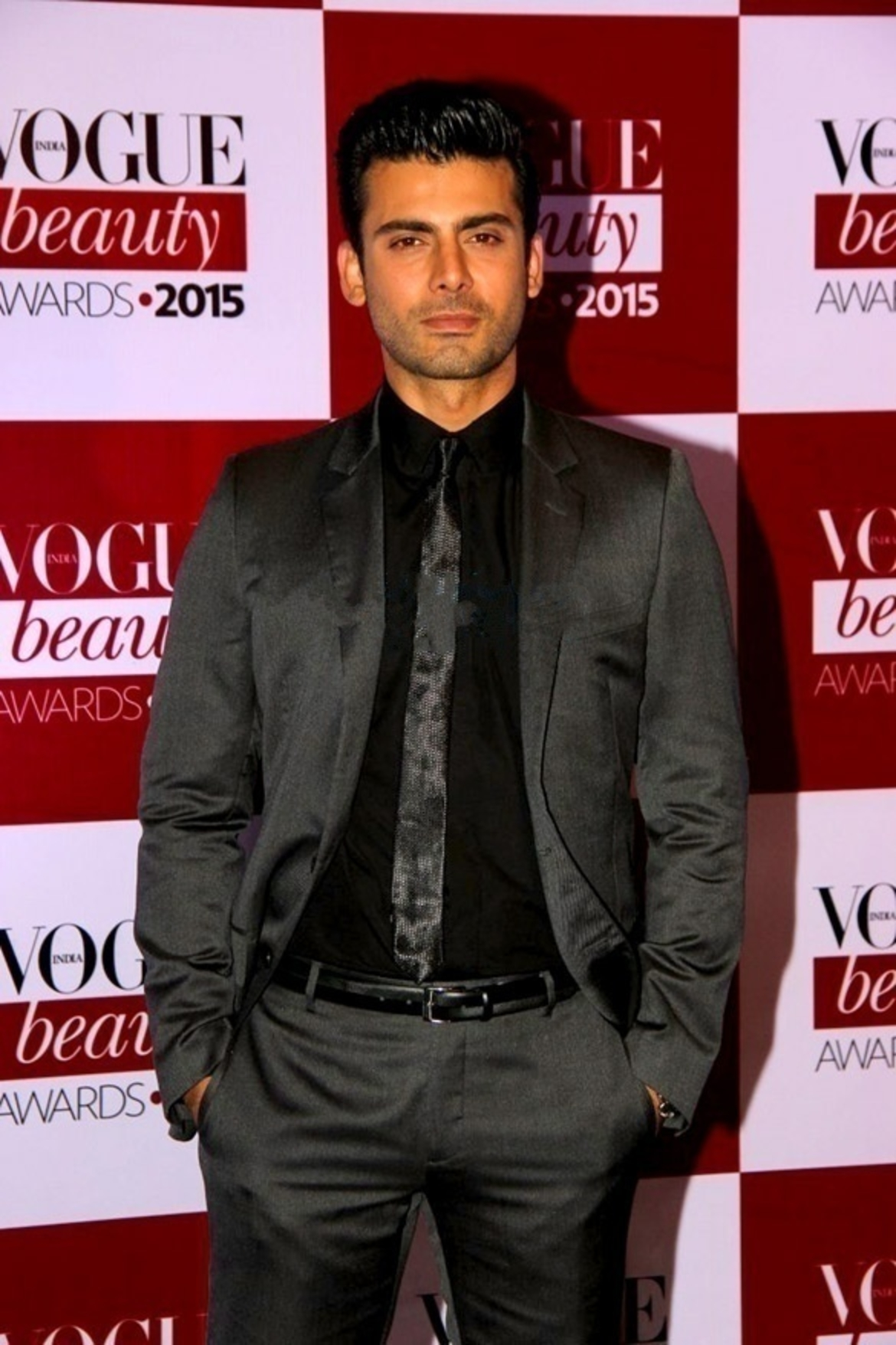
- Khan at Vogue Beauty Awards in 2016
Awards and nominations
Award	Wins	Nominations
Hum Awards	6	7
Lux Style Awards	4	5
Pakistan Media Awards	1	1
Filmfare Awards	1	2
ARY Film Awards	1	1
BIG Star Entertainment Awards	1	1
Star Guild Awards	0	1
Indian Film Festival of Melbourne	1	1
Masala Awards	1	1

Totals (Note: Certain award groups do not simply award one winner. They acknowledge several different recipients, have runners-up, and have third place. Since this is a specific recognition and is different from losing an award, runner-up mentions are considered wins in this award tally. For simplification and to avoid errors, each award in this list has been presumed to have had a prior nomination.)
- Wins: 18
- Nominations: 23

Fawad Afzal Khan (born 29 November 1981) is a Pakistani actor, producer, screenwriter and singer having received several awards including a Filmfare Award, two Lux Style Awards and six Hum Awards. Khan played a lead role in the Pakistani serials Humsafar (2011) and Zindagi Gulzar Hai (2012). For both performances, he received the Lux Style Award for Best Actor – Satellite. Khan made his Bollywood film debut with Khoobsurat (2014), for which he received the Filmfare Award for Best Male Debut. He further starred in Kapoor & Sons (2016), which earned him a nomination for the Filmfare Award for Best Supporting Actor.

== Awards and nominations ==
Year	Award	Category	Work	Result	Ref.
2011	Pakistan Media Awards	Best Actor – Satellite	Dastaan	Won	
2011	10th Lux Style Awards	Best TV Actor – Satellite	Dastaan	Nominated	
2013	1st Hum Awards	Best Onscreen Couple (with Mahira Khan)	Humsafar	Won	
2013	1st Hum Awards	Hum Honorary Phenomenal Serial Award	Humsafar	Won	
2013	12th Lux Style Awards	Best TV Actor – Satellite	Humsafar	Won	
2013	Pakistan Media Awards	Best Actor – Satellite	Humsafar	Nominated	
2013	Tarang Housefull Awards	Best Actor	Armaan	Nominated	
2013	Tarang Housefull Awards	Best Couple (with Aamina Sheikh)	Armaan	Won	
2014	2nd Hum Awards	Best Actor – Jury	Zindagi Gulzar Hai	Nominated	
2014	2nd Hum Awards	Best Actor – Popular	Zindagi Gulzar Hai	Won	
2014	2nd Hum Awards	Best Onscreen Couple – Jury (with Sanam Saeed)	Zindagi Gulzar Hai	Won	
2014	2nd Hum Awards	Best Onscreen Couple – Popular (with Sanam Saeed)	Zindagi Gulzar Hai	Won	
2014	13th Lux Style Awards	Best Actor – Satellite	Zindagi Gulzar Hai	Won	
2014	Masala! Awards	Best Bollywood Debut	Khoobsurat	Won	
2014	BIG Star Entertainment Awards	Most Entertaining Actor (Film) Debut – Male	Khoobsurat	Won	
2014	BIG Star Entertainment Awards	Most Entertaining Actor in a Romantic Film	Khoobsurat	Nominated	
2015	Star Guild Awards	Most Promising Debut (Male)	Khoobsurat	Nominated	
2015	Filmfare Awards	Best Male Debut	Khoobsurat	Won	
2016	Indian Film Festival of Melbourne	Diversity Award	Kapoor & Sons	Won	
2017	Filmfare Awards	Best Supporting Actor	Kapoor & Sons	Nominated	

== Other recognitions ==
Year	Award	Category	Result	Ref.
2015	Hum Awards	International Icon of the Year	Won	
2015	Vogue Beauty Awards	Most Beautiful Man	Won	
2016	ARY Film Awards	International Icon of the Year	Won	
2018	Filmfare Middle East	Best Cinematic Icon	Won	
