= Razia (TV series) =

Pakistani television series

- Urdu: رضیہ
- Genre: Drama; Social; Comedy
- Written by: Mohsin Ali
- Directed by: Mohsin Ali
- Creative director: Nisa Karamatullah
- Starring: Mahira Khan; Shaheera Jalil Albasit; Mohib Mirza; Moomal Sheikh
- Narrated by: Mahira Khan
- Music by: Adnan Dhol; Fabiha Hashmi
- Composers: Adnan Dhol; Aahad Nayani
- Country of origin: Pakistan
- Original language: Urdu
- No. of episodes: 6

Production
- Executive producers: Hina Aman; Kamran Afridi
- Producers: Hina Aman; Kamran Afridi
- Production locations: Hyderabad, Pakistan
- Cinematography: Shoaib Ali
- Editor: Nitrate Media
- Camera setup: Multiple-camera setup
- Running time: 33-42 minutes

Original release
- Network: Express Entertainment
- Release: 14 September – 19 October 2023

Razia is a 2023 Pakistani television miniseries that premiered on Express Entertainment. It stars Mahira Khan, Shaheera Jalil Albasit (as Razia), Moomal Sheikh and Mohib Mirza. The series is directed and written by Mohsin Ali and produced by Kamran Afridi and Hina Aman. The series premiered on 15 September 2023 and concluded on 19 October 2023.

== Premise ==
The miniseries is based on social issues regarding women's status and the problems they face because of biased opinions regarding gender roles in society. The story revolves around Razia (played by Shaheera Jalil Albasit), the first-born daughter in her family where everyone had desired for a boy. The series chronicles her journey towards independence and realization of self-worth beginning when her brother was born and becomes the limelight of the house.

== Soundtracks ==
=== Track listing ===
Following is the listing of complete soundtracks of Razia TV series.

No.	Title	Lyrics	Composer	Singers	Duration
1	Cinderella	Adnan Dhool and Mohsin Ali	Adnan Dhool	Adnan Dhool	3:59
2	Cola Kay Dhaknoon Main	Mohsin Ali	Adnan Dhool	Fabiha Hashim	3:48

== Cast ==
=== Main ===
- Mahira Khan : The narrator.
- Shaheera Jalil Albasit as Razia Saleem (from 16 to 26 year-old) : Saleem and Zohra's daughter; Hajra's granddaughter; Ali's older sister; Savera's mother.
- Moomal Sheikh as Zohra Saleem : Saleem's wife; Razia and Ali's mother.
- Mohib Mirza as Saleem Ahmad : Zohra's husband; Hajra's son; Razia and Ali's father.

=== Supporting ===
- Parveen Akbar as Hajra Ahmad : Saleem's mother; Razia and Ali's grandmother.
- Kausar Siddiqui as Hira Ikhlaq : Ali's ex girlfriend.
- Akbar Islam as Ikhlaq : Hira's father.
- Fajr Sheikh as TV Reporter
- Abeer Naeem
- Shahzad Malik as
- Kaleem Ghori as Mannu aka Manohar : Razia's childhood friend.
- Armaan
- Kashif Hussain as Irfan Ikhlaq : Ikhlaq' son; Hira's brother; Razia's ex husband; Savera's estranged father.
- Daniya Kanwal
- Samina Nazir as Sitara Azeem : Razia's school teacher
- M. Saqib Rajput
- Mansa Salman
- Umm Laila
- Abrash
- Maryam Zahra
- Ayeza Khan
- Esha Usman
- Shayan
- Nauman Malik
- Ali Hoor
- Abdullah
- Hasher
- Fatima Imtiaz

== Production ==
In April 2023, Mahira Khan revealed about her upcoming project which will be premiered on Express Entertainment and will mark Mahira' return to television since Hum Kahan Ke Sachay Thay (2021). Mirza confirmed his role on 2 June. The principal photography of the series started in mid June.

The first teaser was released on 15 August 2023, while the trailer was released on 18 August.
