= TUC: The Lighter Side of Life =

Pakistani television show

- Promotional poster
- Genre: Talk show
- Created by: TUC
- Directed by: Sabiha Sumar; Shahbaz Sumar
- Creative directors: IAL Saatchi & Saatchi
- Presented by: Mahira Khan
- Opening theme: Digitz Media
- Country of origin: Pakistan
- Original language: Urdu
- No. of seasons: 1
- No. of episodes: 13

Production
- Executive producers: Sami Wahid; Naveed Shigri; Ali Amjad; Muhammad Adeel
- Producers: Abdullah Kadwani; Asad Qureshi (7th Sky Entertainment)
- Running time: 50 minutes

Original release
- Network: Hum TV; A-Plus; PTV Home; Apna TV
- Release: 14 December 2013 – 8 March 2014

TUC: The Lighter Side of Life is a talk show for celebrities presented by TUC Pakistan. This show is centered on the guests' personal life, careers and relationship with the paparazzi amongst several others, allowing viewers to receive casual and light-hearted insights into the lives of their favorite celebrities. The first episode of season 1 was aired on Hum TV hosted by Mahira Khan on 14 December 2013 starring Ali Zafar as a guest while the last episode of season 1 was aired on 8 March 2014 in which Fawad Khan appeared as a guest.

== Overview ==
The Lighter Side of Life is the production of 7th Sky Entertainment. The show airs every Saturday at 9:10 pm exclusively on Hum TV. Other media partners are PTV Home, A-Plus and Apna TV. Different guests are invited who may be actors, singers or even cricketers and interviewed about their personal life while keeping the tone of the show light. Mahira makes this show interesting by asking the guest to act out a scene, by making them sing and having a segment known as turqi ba turqi in which guests have to answer rapidly and later there is a picture segment where the guests have to say the first thing flashing in their mind after the respective picture is displayed.

== Guests ==
The guest list of season 1 includes Shoaib Akhtar, Bushra Ansari, Zeba Bakhtiar, Hareem Sheikh, Saba Hameed, Shehreyar and Adeel, Ali Azmat, Shoaib Malik, Fawad Khan, Ali Zafar, Javed Shaikh, Sanam Saeed, and Ayesha Omer.

=== Season 1 ===
Episode #	Date	Guest(s)	Ref
1	14 December	Ali Zafar	
2	21 December	Bushra Ansari	
3	28 December	Shoaib Malik	
4	4 January	Talat Hussain	
5	11 January	Shoaib Akhtar	
6	18 January	Adeel Hussain, Sheheryar Munawar	
7	25 January	Saba Hameed	
8	1 February	Ayesha Omar, Sanam Saeed	
9	8 February	Javed Sheikh	
10	15 February	Zeba Bakhtiar	
11	22 February	Faisal Kapadia, Bilal Maqsood	
12	1 March	Ali Azmat	
13	8 March	Fawad Khan	
