= Fawad Khan =

Pakistani actor, producer, screenwriter, model and singer (born 1981)

- فواد خان
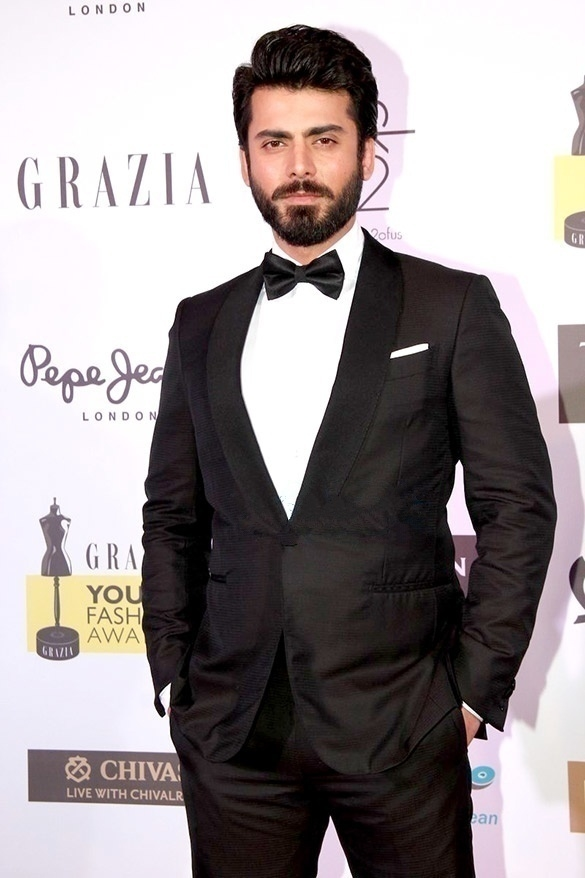
- Khan in 2016
- Born: 29 November 1981 (age 44); Karachi, Sindh, Pakistan
- Education: FAST-NUCES
- Occupations: Actor; Singer; Producer; Screenwriter
- Years active: 2002–2004; 2007–present
- Spouse: Sadaf Fawad Khan (m. 2005)
- Children: 3
- Awards: Full list
- Musical career
- Instruments: Vocals; Guitar; Bass; Drums
- Years active: 2000–present
- Labels: Lips Music (2002–2007); Independent (2009–2015); Coke Studio Pakistan; Pepsi Battle of the Bands
- Formerly of: Entity Paradigm
- Website: fawadkhanofficial.com

Fawad Afzal Khan (Note: Urdu: فواد افضل خان) (born 29 November 1981) is a Pakistani actor, producer, screenwriter, songwriter, and singer known for his work in films and Urdu television. Khan is the recipient of several accolades, including a Filmfare Award, two Lux Style Awards, and six Hum Awards.

Khan began his acting career on the television sitcom, Jutt and Bond. He formed an alternative rock band, Entity Paradigm, with the show's co-stars and began his music career as its lead singer. The band appeared on the finale of Pepsi Battle of the Bands in 2002 and Khan became known for its 2003 debut album, Irtiqa. After about 250 performances, he left the band to pursue a film career. Khan made his film debut with a supporting role in the social drama, Khuda Kay Liye (2007), one of Pakistan's highest-grossing films.

He had his first success in television period drama, Dastaan (2010), for which he received the Best Male Actor Award at the Pakistan Media Awards. Khan played a lead role in the Pakistani television serial Humsafar (2011), and appeared in Sultana Siddiqui's family drama Zindagi Gulzar Hai (2012). For both performances, he received the Lux Style Award for Best Actor. Khan made his Bollywood debut with the romantic comedy, Khoobsurat (2014), for which he received the Filmfare Award for Best Male Debut. He further received critical praise for starring in the family drama Kapoor & Sons (2016), which earned him a nomination for the Filmfare Award for Best Supporting Actor.

Following a brief hiatus, Khan made a comeback with his Marvel Cinematic Universe debut in the miniseries Ms. Marvel (2022) as Hassan. His action-adventure film The Legend of Maula Jatt (2022) became Pakistan's highest-grossing film of all time.

== Early life and education ==
Khan was born on 29 November 1981 in Karachi, Sindh in an Urdu-speaking, ethnic Pashtun family. His father was born in Patiala (present-day Punjab, India) whereas his mother's family was native of Lucknow (present-day Uttar Pradesh, India), who moved to Pakistan after the 1947 partition of India. When Khan was young, his father was in pharmaceutical sales, which required the family to live in Athens, Dubai, Riyadh and Manchester during the Gulf War. His family moved to Lahore, Punjab when he was 13. He has two sisters; his older sister, Aliya, is an architect and his younger sister, Sana, is a physician. He currently lives in Lahore.

Khan studied at an American school, where he said he faced racial issues and was bullied because of his shy, calm, non-combative nature. Khan completed his A-Levels at Lahore Grammar School, Johar Town (LGS JT), and received a bachelor's degree in software engineering from the National University of Computer and Emerging Sciences (NUCES) in Lahore. Because he could not find a job as a programmer, he soon began acting. In a Forbes India interview, Khan said that he had also failed to find a job in marketing. By then, he could play guitar, bass and drums, and became Entity Paradigm's lead singer. Khan's first amateur performance was in the title role of a play, Spartacus.

== Acting career ==
=== Debut, breakthrough and television success (2000–2013) ===
Khan's first television role was a bumbling spy named Bond with his bandmate, Ahmad Ali Butt, in the 2001 sitcom Jutt and Bond. His debut film was Shoaib Mansoor's sociodrama Khuda Kay Liye,in which he played a musician who is brainwashed by the local maulvi. Although the film received positive reviews, critical response to Khan's performance was mixed. Taran Adarsh of Bollywood Hungama called it "strictly OK", but The Economic Times' film critic Gaurav Malani found him "engaged" in the role of an extremist. Released in 2007, the film grossed Rs. 250 million and is one of Pakistan's highest-grossing films. Khan received the Lux Style Award for Best Actor – Film in 2008, and appeared in the TV series Dil Deke Jaenge. Later that year, in Anjum Shahzad's travel adventure TV series Satrangi, he played an engineer who goes on a road trip. In 2010, Khan played a conservative, middle-class boy in the telefilm Aaj Kuch Na Kaho. Although it received negative reviews, Dawn found Khan "superbly convincing" and called him the film's "only redeeming factor". That year, he starred with Sanam Baloch in Haissam Hussain's period TV series Dastaan. Based on Razia Butt's novel, Bano, its story (set in the 1940s) revolves around the separation of a young couple during the 1947 partition. A Dawn reviewer wrote that Khan and his costars gave "superlative performances to match Samira Fazal's wonderful script", and The Express Tribune praised the lead pair's onscreen chemistry. For his performance, Khan won the Best Drama Actor award at the Pakistan Media Awards.

Haissam Hussain's comedy Akbari Asghari, a modern adaptation of Mirat-ul-Uroos, was Khan's first television series in 2011; he played Asghar, an unambitious villager who wants to marry one of his cousins. In an interview with The Hindu's Anuj Kumar, Khan described his character as "completely oaf[ish]". In Kuch Pyar Ka Pagalpan, his third collaboration with Hussain, he starred with Sanam Baloch, Meekal Zulfiqar and Ayesha Khan as a computer engineer who wants to take over his uncle's business. Khan later starred with Mahira Khan in Sarmad Khoosat's TV serial drama, Humsafar, for which he won the Best Actor award at the 2012 Lux Style Awards. Humsafar is Pakistan's highest-rated television serial. The series and Khan's performance were praised. Ranika Rajani praised Humsafar in The Indian Express, calling it a "breath of fresh air" and preferring it to Indian soap operas. According to Rajani, the lead pair's chemistry was the biggest factor in the show's success. Zee News critic Ritka Handoo enjoyed the protagonists' performances, calling the Khans a "quite believable onscreen couple".

Khan's first 2012 role was Rohail, a Turkish resident who goes to Pakistan to marry his cousin but instead marries her sister, in Sarmad Khoosat's Ashk. That year, he played a member of an affluent family (with Sanam Saeed) in Sultana Siddiqui's family-drama TV series Zindagi Gulzar Hai. The serial, one of the most critically acclaimed Pakistani dramas, also received widespread praise in India. Dipti Sharma of The Indian Express enjoyed Khan's skillful portrayal. The role earned him several awards, including the Hum Award for Best Actor Popular and the Lux Style Award for Best Actor – Satellite. Khan's last TV serial was Ahson Talish's sociodrama, Numm. Broadcast in 2013, Khan played a boy who secretly marries a girl in London and is forced to marry another girl when he returns to Pakistan. Behadd, director Asim Raza's telefilm, featured Khan as a young divorcee who proposes to a widow who is the mother of a teenage girl. The Times of India noted that Khan's character in Behadd was different from those in Humsafar and Zindagi Gulzar Hai, calling it "another benchmark". His last telefilm was Anjum Shahzad's romance Armaan (with Aamina Sheikh), where he played a young, flirtatious boy. He also co-wrote the telefilm's screenplay, with Vasay Chaudhry.

=== Work in India (2014–2016) ===
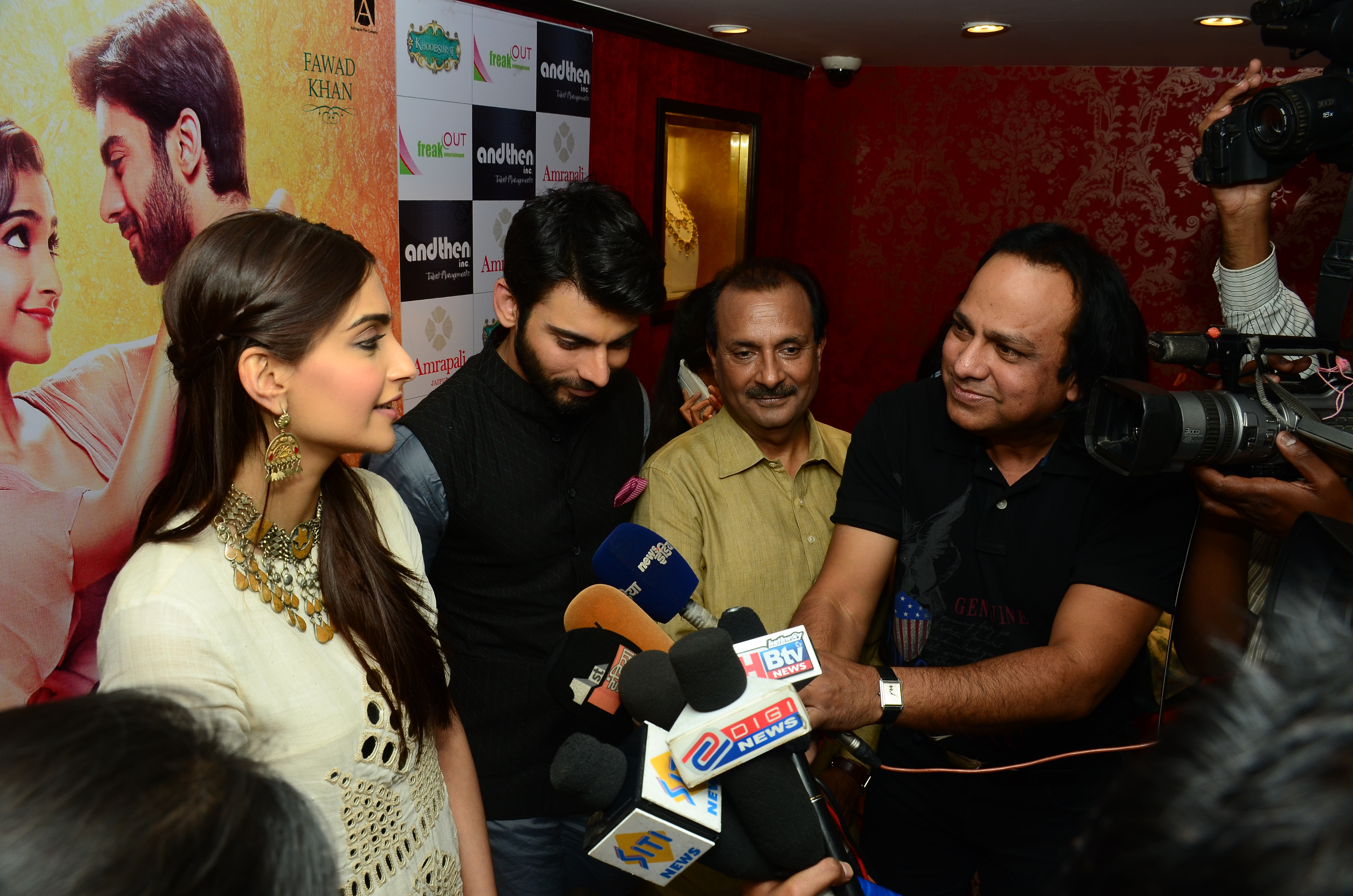
Khan with actress Sonam Kapoor at a promotional event for their film Khoobsurat in 2014.

Khan was originally expected to make his debut in India's Hindi film industry, commonly known as 'Bollywood', soon after the release of Khuda Kay Liye but the unstable political situation between India and Pakistan after the 2008 Mumbai terror attacks delayed it. He made his Bollywood debut in Shashanka Ghosh's 2014 comedy-drama, Khoobsurat, with Sonam Kapoor. Khan played Vikram Singh Rathore, Kapoor's love interest and the son of her patient. On Zee News, Ritika Handoo praised his "immensely polished acting skills" and said that he fit his character very well. Deepanjana Pal of Firstpost liked Gosh's decision to make Khan's character a sex object, feeling that he blazed a trail for other male actors in similar roles. The film was particularly well received in the UK, the UAE, and Pakistan because of Khan's following in those countries from his television work. He received a Filmfare Award for Best Male Debut for his role in the film.

Khan made a cameo appearance in Asim Raza's coming-of-age film, Ho Mann Jahaan, in January 2016. He then had a main role in Shakun Batra's family drama, Kapoor & Sons. The film, which featured Khan as part of an ensemble cast including Rishi Kapoor, Ratna Pathak Shah, Rajat Kapoor, Sidharth Malhotra, and Alia Bhatt, was a commercial success. The actor received near-unanimous critical praise for his portrayal of Rahul Kapoor, a closeted homosexual writer. A Bollywood Hungama reviewer enjoyed Khan's performance, saying that his character creates an emotional connection with the audience, and NDTV film critic Saibal Chaterjee praised his self-assured performance. Kapoor & Sons earned Khan the Diversity Award at the Indian Film Festival of Melbourne and a nomination for Best Supporting Actor at the 62nd Filmfare Awards. According to the film's producer, Karan Johar, "We went to six actors and after six rejections, I told Shakun Batra (director) that we should drop the idea and he started developing another screenplay. Later, in a flash of thought Fawad came to my mind. I sent him the script, he loved it and said he would do it." In September 2016, Johar said that Khan's wife pressured him to accept the role. Later in 2016, Khan appeared in a small role with Ranbir Kapoor, Anushka Sharma, and Aishwarya Rai Bachchan in Karan Johar's romantic drama, Ae Dil Hai Mushkil. Raja Sen of Rediff.com found his role "far too little to justify the ridiculous kerfuffle his casting had caused", but called him the perfect choice for the part. In Deccan Chronicle Subhash K. Jha described Khan's role as "meagre and sketchy".

After the 2016 Uri terror attack, relations between India and Pakistan deteriorated and the Indian Motion Picture Producers Association (IMPPA) and the Film Producers Guild of India banned Pakistani artists from working in India until the situation normalised.

=== Acting comeback (2022–present) ===
In 2022, Khan made his acting comeback with his Marvel Cinematic Universe debut in Ms. Marvel as Hassan, Kamala Khan / Ms. Marvel's great-grandfather.

Later in 2022, Khan appeared in Bilal Lashari's Punjabi action-drama film, The Legend of Maula Jatt, alongside Mahira Khan and Hamza Ali Abbassi in which Fawad played the title role originated by Sultan Rahi. For the role, he gained considerable weight. It became the highest-grossing Pakistani film of all time as well as the highest-grossing Punjabi-language film of all time.

In 2023, he appeared in Faisal Qureshi's comedy film Money Back Guarantee which got mixed reviews.

In 2024, Khan appeared in Asim Abbasi's 2024 fantasy drama series Barzakh which garnered generally positive reviews from critics. In 2024, he also started filming Aarti S. Bagdi's romantic comedy Aabeer Gulaal in the UK, alongside Vaani Kapoor, the film was scheduled for release on 9 May 2025 but was later postponed indefinitely following the 2025 Pahalgam attack and the ensuing India–Pakistan diplomatic tensions. It was finally released in September 2025.

He reunited with Mahira Khan for Neelofar, released in November 2025.

=== Upcoming projects ===
He is expected to appear as pop singer Alamgir in Sultan Ghani's Albela Rahi. Fawad Khan will also be seen in the lead role of renowned director and producer Haseeb Hasan's upcoming film Aan. Khan is also set to star Pakistan's first Netflix Original Series, Jo Bachay Hain Sang Samait Lo, which is an official adaptation of Farhat Ishtiaq’s 2013 Urdu-language novel of the same name. He will star alongside Mahira Khan, Sanam Saeed, and Ahad Raza Mir.

== Music career ==
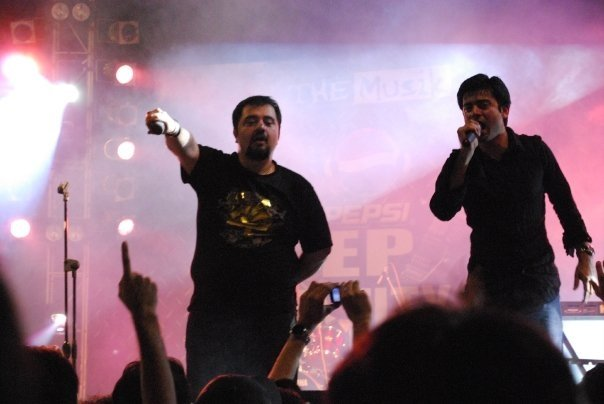
Khan (right) performing with Ahmed Ali Butt in 2009.

Two rock bands, Ahmed Ali Butt's Entity and Khan's Paradigm, were active in Lahore between 1994 and 2000. The bands collaborated on the title track of a television sitcom, Jutt and Bond (featuring Khan and Ahmed Ali Butt), in the early 2000s. This collaboration led to the bands' merger into Entity Paradigm. The new band appeared in the 2002 finale of Pepsi Battle of the Bands, losing to the band Aaroh. Entity Paradigm's debut album, Irtiqa, was released in October 2003; it received broad critical appreciation, particularly the popular romantic track "Rahguzar". The band broke up in 2007, reuniting in 2010 to participate in the third season of Coke Studio (where they covered Sajjad Ali's "Bolo Bolo"). Their single, "Shor Macha", was released that year. Dawn listed it among the year's most popular Pakistani songs in the newspaper's online poll. Khan was featured in its video (directed by Bilal Lashari), and said that he had played almost 250 shows as a musician. He left the band in 2012 to focus on his acting career.

Khan appeared as a judge on Pepsi Battle of the Bands in July 2017, with Atif Aslam and Meesha Shafi. He sang the show's introductory song, and appeared in its video (released on 23 July) with Aslam and Shafi. According to Vafa Batool of Pakistan Today, Khan "preferred to acknowledge the raw live energy on stage." Khan and the other members of Entity Paradigm reunited and performed "Hamesha" in the show's finale.

== Other work and media image ==
Khan attended Islamic Relief USA fundraisers in San Jose and Washington, D.C., and raised money for the Shukat Khanum Memorial Cancer Hospital and Research Centre in Bahrain. He has supported SOS Children's Villages by participating in children's carnivals in 2014 and 2017. In March 2015, Khan toured the United States and Canada and raised money for Pakistani charities; he has also raised money in London for charitable organisations in Pakistan. He and his wife participated in a musical tour of the United States to raise money for charitable organisations throughout Pakistan. In November 2015, they officiated at the launch of a tree-planting event organised by the Shaukat Khanum Memorial Cancer Hospital and Research Centre in Peshawar. Khan appeared in Ali Zafar's music video, "Urainge", which was made as a tribute to the victims of the 2014 Peshawar school attack.

He is the Italian brand Giovanni's brand ambassador in Pakistan. Khan is also the Pakistani brand ambassador for the Suzuki Vitara, Pepsi, Oye Hoye, Tapal Tea, Zameen.com, Servis Shoes, Samsung, Telenor, Jazz, Warid, LUX, Tarang, Aquafina, Clear, Olper's, Lays, Bold, Nestle, QMobile and TUC biscuits. He has been an ambassador for the Pakistan Super League's Islamabad United cricket team since January 2016. Khan modeled for fashion designer Munib Nawaz in 2010, Umar Sayeed in 2012, and for the Republic by Omar Farooq in 2015.

Khan is one of the highest-paid actors in the Pakistani film industry. According to director and producer Abdullah Kadwani, "Fawad is the closest actor to Waheed Murad." Soon after the release of Khoobsurat, The Indian Express's Mimansa Shekhar wrote that the actor redefined the Bollywood actor with charm, replacing "stereotype body builders with six packs". After the success of Kapoor & Sons, Nirmalya Dutta of Daily News and Analysis called Khan's portrayal of a gay male "a big leap forward for India's LGBT movement"; in India, where homosexuality was illegal at that time, "Khan had the guts and gumption to play this seminal role." In August 2016, Ranbir Kapoor said that Khan opened a door by playing a gay man and he was now comfortable playing such a role.

Khan is described by South Asian media as one of its most attractive men, and he was named the Most Beautiful Man at the 2015 Vogue Beauty Awards. He was ranked third in the Times of India's 50 Most Desirable Men poll in 2014 and 2015, and was fifth in 2016. In November 2014, Khan received the Fresh Face of the Year Award at the Hello! Hall of Fame Awards in India. The British magazine Eastern Eye ranked Khan seventh in 2014 and sixth from 2015 to 2018 third and sixth on its annual list of sexiest Asian men. For his style and fashion, he received the Crush of the Year Award at the Grazia Young Fashion Awards. TC Candler, an independent critics list, nominated Khan as one of the 100 Most Handsome Faces of 2017. He was nominated for the International Pakistan Prestige Award for Style Icon of the Year in September 2017 (which went to Hamza Ali Abbasi).

The Herald named Khan one of its 10 People of 2016. He was ranked the fifth-most-popular Bollywood actor of November 2014, and was called the most popular Bollywood actor in March 2016 by Times Celebex. MenXP ranked Khan 37th on its Most Popular Bollywood celebrities of 2014 list. He was the first Pakistani to appear on the cover of Filmfare magazine, in September 2014, and again appeared on its cover in October 2015 and March 2016. Hi! Blizt magazine featured Khan on its cover in 2016. He received the Best Male Debut Award at the IBNlive Movie Awards, with 48.54 per cent of the vote.

== Personal life ==
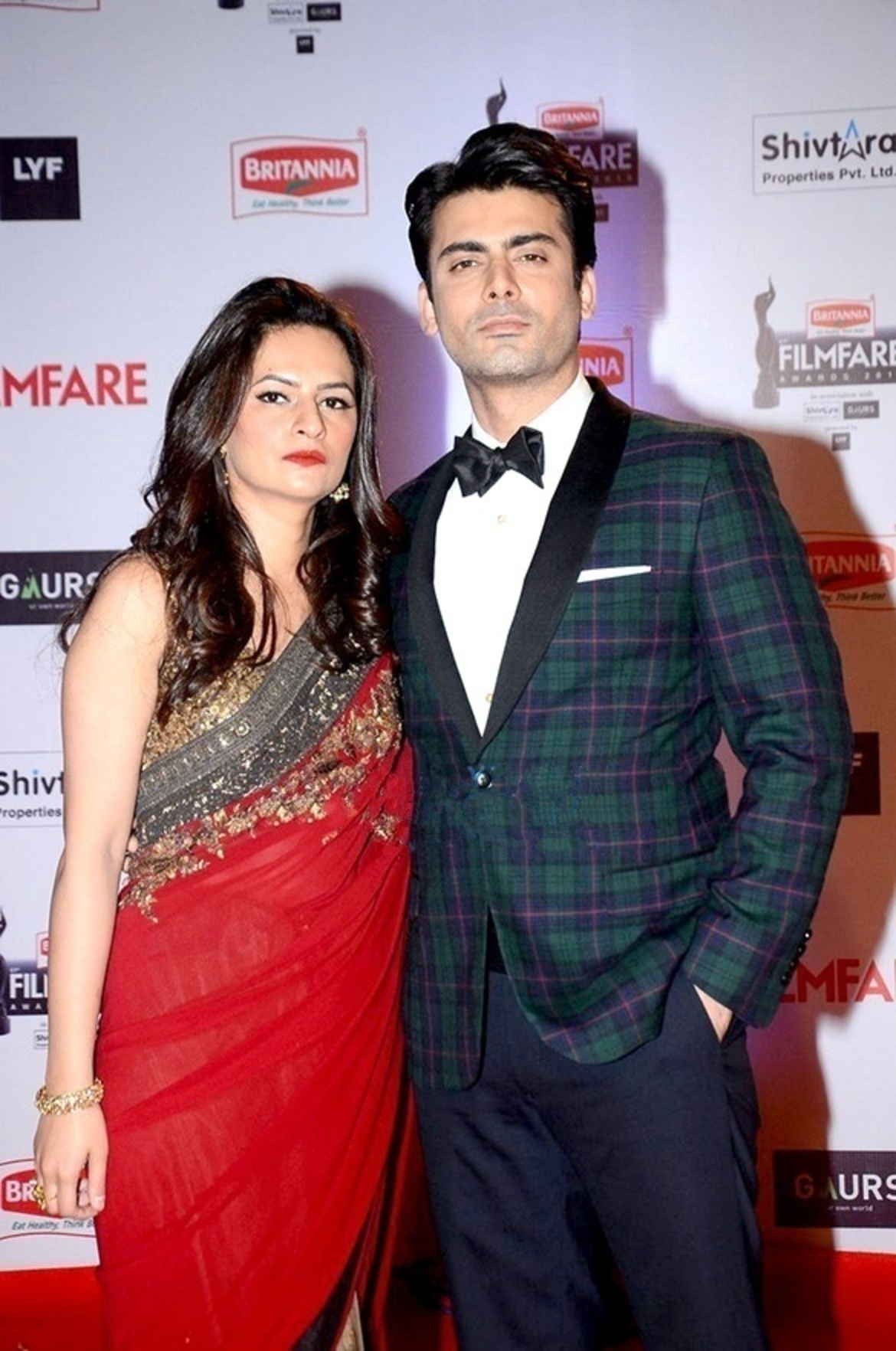
Khan with wife Sadaf Khan at the 61st Filmfare Awards event, in 2016.

Khan married Sadaf Khan (née Ahmad) in 2005 after an eight-year courtship. They have three children. Khan and his wife founded Silk by Fawad Khan, a clothing line, whose debut collection was launched in August 2012 in Lahore.

He was diagnosed with Type 1 diabetes at age 17, after an accident which damaged his pancreas. The accident occurred behind a swimming pool, where Khan was scratched and jumped into untreated water. He later realized he had the disease when he lost 10 kilograms (22 lb).

Khan performed Hajj, the annual pilgrimage of Muslims to Makkah, along with his family in 2018 and was therein invited to the Annual Hajj Lunch by King Salman and Crown Prince Mohammed bin Salman of Saudi Arabia.

== Filmography ==
Key
†	Denotes titles that have not yet been released

=== Films ===
- All films are in Urdu unless otherwise noted.

Year	Title	Role	Notes	Ref.
2007	Khuda Kay Liye	Sarmad	Debut film	
2014	Khoobsurat	Vikram Singh Rathore	Hindi debut film	
2016	Ho Mann Jahaan	Rafael	Cameo appearance	
2016	Kapoor & Sons	Rahul Kapoor	Hindi film	
2016	Ae Dil Hai Mushkil	DJ Ali	Hindi film	
2018	Jawani Phir Nahi Ani 2	Tipu Shah	Cameo appearance	
2019	Parey Hut Love	Himself	Cameo appearance	
2022	The Legend of Maula Jatt	Maula Jatt	Pakistani Punjabi film	
2023	Money Back Guarantee	Manager Bilal Bux		
2025	Aabeer Gulaal	Aabeer Singh	Hindi film	
2025	Neelofar	Mansoor Ali Khan	Also producer	
TBA	Aan †	TBA	Filming	
TBA	The Prisoner †	DSP Akbar Khan		

=== Television series ===
Year	Title	Role	Network	Notes
2001	Jutt and Bond	Bond	Indus Vision	Acting debut
2008	Dil De Ke Jayengy	Arsalan	Geo Entertainment	
2008	Satrangi	Behzad	Geo Entertainment	
2010	Daastan	Hassan	Hum TV	
2011	Akbari Asghari	Asghar	Hum TV	
2011	Kuch Pyar Ka Pagalpan	Mujtaba	ARY Digital	
2011	Humsafar	Ashar Hussain	Hum TV	
2012	Ashk	Rohail Hayat	Geo Entertainment	
2012	Zindagi Gulzar Hai	Zaroon Junaid	Hum TV	
2013	Numm	Wali Bakht Khan	Geo Entertainment	
2022	Ms. Marvel	Hassan	Disney+	Episodes 4 & 5
2025	Pakistan Idol	Judge	Geo TV	Season 2

=== Web series ===
Year	Title	Role	Notes	Ref.
2022	Baarwan Khiladi	Kamran	Cameo appearance; Tapmad	
2024	Barzakh	Shehryar	Web series for ZEE5	
2026	Jo Bachay Hain Sang Samait Lo †	Mehmood Akhtar	Completed	
TBA	Shandur †			

=== Telefilms ===
Year	Title	Role	Network	Notes
2006	Kal	Haroon	PTV Home	Opposite Saba Qamar
2010	Aaj Kuch Na Kaho	Rehan	Hum TV	
2013	Behadd	Jamal "Jo" Ahmed	Hum TV	
2013	Armaan	Armaan	PTV Home	Also co-writer & co-producer

=== Music video appearances ===
Year	Song	Artist	Ref.
2015	"Urain Ge"	Ali Zafar	

== Discography ==
Year	Song	Work title/Album	Ref
2003	"Fitrat"	Irtiqa	
2003	"Barzakh"	Irtiqa	
2003	"Kahan Hai Tu"	Irtiqa	
2003	"Hamein Aazma"	Irtiqa	
2003	"Agosh"	Irtiqa	
2004	"Waqt"	Irtiqa	
2004	"Hamesha"	Irtiqa	
2010	"Shor Macha"	Single by (Entity Paradigm)	
2018	"Satrangi"	original single; performed in Pepsi Battle of the Bands grand finale	
2019	"Uth Jaag"	original single; performed in Pepsi Battle of the Bands grand finale	

=== Other appearances ===
Year	Song	Work	Notes
2010	"Bolo Bolo"	Coke Studio	
2017	"Do Pal Ka Yeh Jewan Hai"	Pepsi Battle of the Bands	Season 2; co-singers Atif Aslam and Meesha Shafi
2018	Mashup	Pepsi Battle of the Bands	Season 3; co-singer Shafi, Strings, Kashmir and Badnaam
2019	"Khel Deewano Ka"	2019 Pakistan Super League official anthem	ft. Young Desi; written and produced by Shuja Haider
