= Satrangi =

Pakistani TV drama series

- Genre: Travel Adventure
- Written by: Jawad Daud
- Directed by: Imran Hussain
- Starring: Fawad Khan (For entire cast see below)
- Ending theme: Satrangi Rey by Fawad Khan
- No. of seasons: 1
- No. of episodes: 79

Production
- Executive producer: Anjum Shahzad
- Producer: Imran Hussain
- Editors: Kashif Ali Khan; Adnan Ashfaq

Satrangi (English: Seven Colors of Rainbow) is a 2008 Pakistani travel adventure drama series produced and directed by Imran Hussain, which broadcast on Geo TV. Jawad Daud wrote the drama, which focussed on what youngsters think, what they are going through and how their families do not understand their problems.

== Plot summary ==
It is a story of seven friends (four boys and three girls) who came from different backgrounds and clashed with their parents. They all decided to leave their homes and go somewhere to live on their terms. They travelled the whole of Pakistan from Karachi to Azad Kashmir. They started their journey from Karachi and went on to visit all of the provinces of Pakistan. On that journey, they went to all the famous and historical places. Their trials were also shown, from family issues to love affairs and humour to suspense. It was a mixture of travel, adventure and struggles. It also tells how one can manage to live with different personalities. Behzaad is a filthy rich guy who is always at daggers drawn with his busy lawyer father. Nashmia is a middle-class girl who has stopped eye contact with her mother ever since she remarried. Raayaan is a middle-class guy with a white-collared job. Shehzore is from a remote village and believes he is meant for urban life. Khayyam thinks that he is a musician who has yet to find his instrument and his style of music. Rushna acts nothing like a girl because she has become a tomboy completely. Bisma is more in need of love than being in search of love. These seven people embark on a journey of a lifetime. Behzaad builds a special mini-bus for this purpose. These youngsters board it and leave from Karachi. Superficially, for all of them, this is just a tour that will take them to Khyber in just three days. But, the travel stretches to months as they discover that everyone on this journey has a lot of emotional baggage. And, more importantly, they don't have to be together to form a rainbow. Each one of them is a rainbow.

== Cast ==
- Fawad Khan as Behzaad
- Sawera Pasha as Nashmiya
- Agha Ali as Khayyam
- Ambreen gul as Rushna
- Hamza Ahmed as Shehzore
- Seher Gul as Bisma
- Zohaib as Raayaan

== Soundtrack ==
Satrangi Rey

Soundtrack album by Fawad Khan
- Genre: Theme song
- Length: 5:50
- Language: Urdu

Fawad Khan sang the Satrangi Re title song and lyrics by Nadeem Asad.
