= Baarwan Khiladi =

Pakistani sports drama web series

- Genre: Cricket, Sports
- Written by: Shahid Dogar
- Directed by: Adnan Sarwar
- Starring: Danyal Zafar; Shahveer Jafry; Sarmad Khoosat; Fawad Khan; Kinza Hashmi
- Country of origin: Pakistan
- Original language: Urdu
- No. of episodes: 8

Production
- Producers: Nina Kashif; Mahira Khan
- Production company: Soul Fry Films

Original release
- Release: 5 March 2022

Baarwan Khiladi (Urdu: بارہواں کھلاڑی, lit. '12th Man') is a Pakistani sports drama web series produced by Nina Kashif and Mahira Khan in the latter's debut production under her banner Soul Fry Films. It is directed by Adnan Sarwar. The cast of the web series include Kinza Hashmi, Shahveer Jafry, Khaqan Shahnawaz, Saba Faisal and Sarmad Khoosat in leading roles with Fawad Khan and Shoaib Malik in cameo appearances. It was released on 5 March 2022, on OTT platform Tapmad TV.

It was later aired on Express Entertainment, with the first episode broadcast on 11 August 2022.

== Premise ==
The plot revolves around a smalltown young boy who has a passion for cricket and aspires to become a famous cricketer. After his selection in the country's cricket league, he faces hurdles and unjust behaviour but ultimately finds his due.

== Cast ==
- Zarrar Khan as Sohail
- Shahveer Jafry
- Khaqan Shahnawaz
- Danyal Zafar
- Kinza Hashmi
- Saba Faisal
- Sarmad Khoosat
- Mira Sethi
- Ali Tahir
- Fawad Khan

== Production ==
Khan announced about her production debut in February 2022, revealing the poster and cast of the series on her Instagram handle.
