= Khoobsurat (2014 film) =

2014 Indian film by Shashanka Ghosh

- Theatrical release poster
- Directed by: Shashanka Ghosh
- Written by: Indira Bisht; Juhi Chaturvedi
- Produced by: Rhea Kapoor; Anil Kapoor; Siddharth Roy Kapur
- Starring: Sonam Kapoor; Fawad Khan
- Cinematography: Tushar Kanti Ray
- Edited by: Bakul Matiyani
- Music by: Songs: Sneha Khanwalkar; Badshah; Amaal Mallik; Background Score: Simaab Sen
- Production companies: Walt Disney Pictures; Anil Kapoor Films Company
- Distributed by: UTV Motion Pictures
- Release date: 19 September 2014
- Running time: 127 minutes
- Country: India
- Language: Hindi
- Budget: ₹23 crore (US$2.4 million)
- Box office: est. ₹79.43 crore (US$8.2 million)

Khoobsurat (transl. Beautiful) is a 2014 Indian Hindi-language romantic comedy-drama film. The film is directed by Shashanka Ghosh and produced by Rhea Kapoor, Anil Kapoor and Siddharth Roy Kapur. It stars Sonam Kapoor, Fawad Khan, Kirron Kher, Ratna Pathak, and Aamir Raza Hussain. The film is loosely based on the 1980 film of the same name.

== Plot ==
Mrinalini "Milli" Chakravarty is a physiotherapist who works for the Kolkata Knight Riders. Her loud Punjabi mother Manju hopes that she will find a suitable and charming man to marry. Her services are called upon by a royal family in Rajasthan where King Shekhar Singh Rathore is paralyzed from the waist down. She is told that 40 doctors have already left a demanding job.

Milli travels to the royal palace and meets the discipline-oriented queen, Nirmala Devi Rathore, who is not amused by Milli's enthusiasm and clumsiness. Milli finds that her casual way of living clashes with the strict discipline of the royal household. She meets the prince, Vikram Singh Rathore, whose distant personality makes him similar to his parents. Milli befriends Divya Rathore, the youngest child princess of the family, and encourages her passion for cinema against the family's wishes that she study business management.

Shekhar avoids the exercises Milli prescribes and she turns to Vikram for help. He gives Milli the same answer that Nirmala gave her - if she can't stand the heat, she might as well get out of the kitchen. Milli becomes frustrated and tells them that they should be helping Shekhar, accusing them of being stubborn, rigid and self-centered.

Milli is about to leave when she learns from Ram Sevak, Shekhar's trusted servant, that Shekhar's injury came from a car accident that killed his eldest son. The queen's demeanor changed due to his paralysis and the responsibilities thrust upon her, and the once-happy atmosphere of the royal household came to its present state. Milli shames Shekhar into getting over his guilt and tries to befriend him through conversation and video games, and encourages him to talk about the car accident.

Milli sees improvements after 2–3 months with Shekhar, who persuades Vikram to take Milli with him to Surajgarh Palace. They spend some time together, and the prince leaves for a meeting while she shops. Milli is kidnapped; when Vikram saves her, they share a kiss. Though they agree to set aside their attraction, the two start falling in love. Milli confesses her love for him but Vikram refuses to acknowledge it, saying that they come from two different stocks; he is also engaged to a lady of his status, Kiara.

Divya runs away for film auditions in Jaipur. Milli informs Nirmala that she knew about Divya's plans, and is ordered out of the palace, heartbroken over Vikram's rejection. Divya returns and tells Nirmala that she came back because of Milli. Shekhar then surprises Nirmala by rising to his feet and admitting that he saw Divya run away. He tells her that this is what Milli has been trying to teach them: to love life as it is. Vikram breaks off his engagement with Kiara and confesses his love for Milli; his parents give their blessing and send him to find her in Delhi.

Vikram eventually finds Milli at a paintball arena, and declares his love for her. Covered in paint, he wins her mother's approval by proposing in her style. They are married, with Milli given the title of "The Royal Misfit."

== Cast ==
- Fawad Khan as Prince Vikram Singh Rathore, the prince, Nirmala and Shekhar's son, Divya's brother, Milli's husband and Kiara's ex-fiancée
- Sonam Kapoor Ahuja as Dr. Mrinalini "Milli" Rathore (nee: Chakravarty), a physiotherapist; Manju and Pritam's daughter; Kabir's sister; Shekar's doctor; Vikram's wife
- Kirron Kher as Manju Chakravarty, Milli's mother
- Aamir Raza Husain as King Shekhar Singh Rathore, Vikram's father; Milli's patient
- Ratna Pathak Shah as Queen Nirmala Devi Rathore, Vikram's mother
- Simran Jehani as Princess Divya Rathore, Vikram's younger sister
- Ashok Banthia as Ram Sevak, Shekhar's most trusted royal servant
- Aditi Rao Hydari as Kiara, a lady of Vikram's status and his ex-fiancée (extended cameo appearance)
- Rishab Chadha as Kabir Chakravarty, Milli's brother
- Cyrus Sahukar as Nausher Bandookwaala
- Kaizaad Kotwal as Pratik Chakravarty, Milli's father
- Seema Pahwa as Shalini Shah
- Ali Fazal as Prince Charming
- Yashwant Singh as Maharaja Suraj Maan Singh

== Music ==
Khoobsurat

Soundtrack album by Sneha Khanwalkar
- Released: 15 September 2014
- Genre: Feature film soundtrack
- Length: 23:48
- Label: T-Series

Sneha Khanwalkar chronology
Youngistaan (2014)	Khoobsurat (2014)	Detective Byomkesh Bakshy! (2015)

The music of Khoobsurat was composed by Sneha Khanwalkar, Badshah and Amaal Mallik. The lyrics were written by a range of artists including, Ikram Rajasthani, Badshah, Kumaar, Sunil Choudhary, Amitabh Verma and Sneha Khanwalkar. The first song, "Engine Ki Seeti", was released on 7 August 2014, and samples Rajasthani folk song "Anjun Ki Seeti" which Ikram Rajasthani specifically re-wrote for the film. A promotional song titled "Abhi Toh Party Shuru Hui Hai", composed by Punjabi rapper Badshah was released on 22 August 2014. The film's soundtrack was officially released on 1 September 2014.

The producers felt that the film lacked a soulful love song and upon the request of Rhea Kapoor, music composer Amaal Mallik wrote the song "Naina", which is sung by his brother Armaan Malik and Sona Mohapatra.

Khoobsurat Soundtrack
No.	Title	Lyrics	Music	Singer(s)	Length
1.	"Engine Ki Seeti"	Ikram Rajasthani	Sneha Khanwalkar	Sunidhi Chauhan, Resmi Sateesh	3:55
2.	"Abhi Toh Party Shuru Hui Hai"	Badshah	Badshah	Badshah, Aastha Gill	2:59
3.	"Baal Khade"	Sunil Choudhary	Sneha Khanwalkar	Sunidhi Chauhan	3:59
4.	"Preet"	Amitabh Verma	Sneha Khanwalkar	Jasleen Royal	5:03
5.	"Maa Ka Phone"	Amitabh Verma, Sneha Khanwalkar	Sneha Khanwalkar	Priya Saraiya, Mauli Dave	4:07
6.	"Naina"	Kumaar	Amaal Mallik	Sona Mohapatra, Armaan Malik	3:45
Total length:					27:55

== Box office ==
=== Domestic ===
Khoobsurat opened to a slow start at the box office, with occupancies ranging from 15 to 20 percent at multiplexes and single screens across India. The film earned about ₹27.4 million (US$280,000) on its opening day, it is one of the lowest openings of Sonam Kapoor. Due to positive word of mouth, Khoobsurat showed 30% growth at the box office, earning ₹37.4 million (US$390,000) on the second day of release and ₹50.5 million (US$520,000) on the third. The film netted a total of ₹115 million (US$1.2 million) during the first three days of release, with Box Office India describing the weekend collections as "low", but with "good" trending. The film remained steady throughout the rest of the week, netting ₹191 million (US$2.0 million) in India alone. Remaining steady on its eighth day of release, the film collected ₹15.3 million (US$160,000), and a further ₹24.4 million (US$250,000) on its ninth day, being declared as a "hit" by various media outlets.

=== Overseas ===
Khoobsurat performed fairly well overseas. As of 21 September 2014, Khoobsurat earned ₹110 million (US$1.1 million) in Pakistan, ₹30.6 million (US$320,000) in the United States and Canada, ₹36.9 million (US$380,000) in the UK, ₹69.3 million (US$720,000) in the United Arab Emirates, ₹3.5 million (US$36,000) in Australia, ₹0.90 million (US$9,300) in New Zealand and ₹4.70 million (US$49,000) in Malaysia. In the first two days of release, it had netted a total of ₹250 million (US$2.6 million) in the overseas markets.

== Awards and nominations ==
Award	Category	Nominee(s) and recipient(s)	Result	Ref.
Filmfare Awards	Best Male Debut	Fawad Khan	Won	
Filmfare Awards	Best Actress	Sonam Kapoor	Nominated	
Filmfare Awards	Best Female Playback Singer	Sona Mohapatra – "Naina"	Nominated	
Masala! Awards	Best Bollywood Debut	Fawad Khan	Won	
International Indian Film Academy Awards	Star Debut of the Year – Male	Fawad Khan	Nominated	
Producers Guild Film Awards	Most Promising Debut – Male	Fawad Khan	Nominated	
Stardust Awards	Best Actress in a Comedy or Romance	Sonam Kapoor	Won	
Screen Awards	Best Actress (Popular Choice)	Sonam Kapoor	Nominated	
BIG Star Entertainment Awards	Most Entertaining Actor in a Comedy Film – Female	Sonam Kapoor	Nominated	
BIG Star Entertainment Awards	Most Entertaining Actor (Film) Debut – Male	Fawad Khan	Nominated	
Mirchi Music Awards	Upcoming Male Vocalist of The Year	Armaan Malik – "Naina"	Nominated	

== Critical reception ==
Khoobsurat garnered mixed to positive reviews from critics.

Koel Puri of India Today gave the film 4/5, saying "[the film] is no path breaker but for the fact that I just can't fault it, I still have a smile plastered on my face and I'll probably go see it again... tomorrow". Subhash K. Jha also gave a 4/5 and said, "Hrishida won't recognise this as his Khubsoorat. But he won't disapprove of what has been done to his work". Rachit Gupta of Filmfare gave the film a 4/5 and said that, "director Shashank Ghosh is no Hrishikesh Mukherjee" though manages "to make a perfect Disney movie. It makes you laugh. It makes you go 'aww' and that goes a long way in a young romance". Saibaal Chatterjee of NDTV also gave a positive review, giving the film a 3.5/5 and saying, "in the end, Khoobsurat is a pretty good show. It is both funny and flashy, but its many flourishes are delivered in measures that religiously avoid excess".

Srijana Mitra Das of Times of India gave the film 3.5/5 and said, "This delightfully roguish romance tickles everything fun-loving inside you ... that's what makes it so khoobsurat." Rajeev Masand of CNN IBN gave a rating of 3/5 and wrote, "Khoobsurat is for those seeking comfort in the familiar, it's a pretty satisfying watch." Sarita A. Tanwar of DNA India gave the film 3/5 and said it "is sure to connect with the hearts of girls of all ages". Sonia Chopra of Sify also gave the film a 3/5, and said "this film has little of the gentle nuance of the Hrishikesh Mukherjee-directed original, but it's still pretty good fun. This Bollywood-Disney fairytale combo is worth a shot". Raja Sen, of Rediff gave the film 3/5, and compared it to candy, saying "wrapped in bright plastic and frequently too sweet for your own good, they act as sunny, unsurprising treats that lead to sticky, syrupy smiles". Andy Webster of the New York Times also wrote positively, saying "Bollywood films have appropriated Hollywood genres and imagery for years, but Mr. Ghosh, using a pleasing pastel palette, deftly achieves a particularly Disney-like polish. And he avoids making-of-a-royal pitfalls: Ms. Kapoor's character never abandons her humor for refinement. Twice, Mili says that she was raised to speak up for herself. Not a bad characteristic for a future Rajput princess".

A critic at Bollywood Hungama gave the film 2.5/5, and said, "overall, Khoobsurat is likeable in parts with good performances and stunning visuals; however the weak script is an 'ugly' hurdle this film will face at the box-office". Sweta Kaushal of Hindustan Times also gave a negative review, giving the film a 1/5, and said "the film could have been more tolerable".
