= Mahira Khan =

Pakistani actress (born 1984)

- ماہرہ خان; माहिरा ख़ान
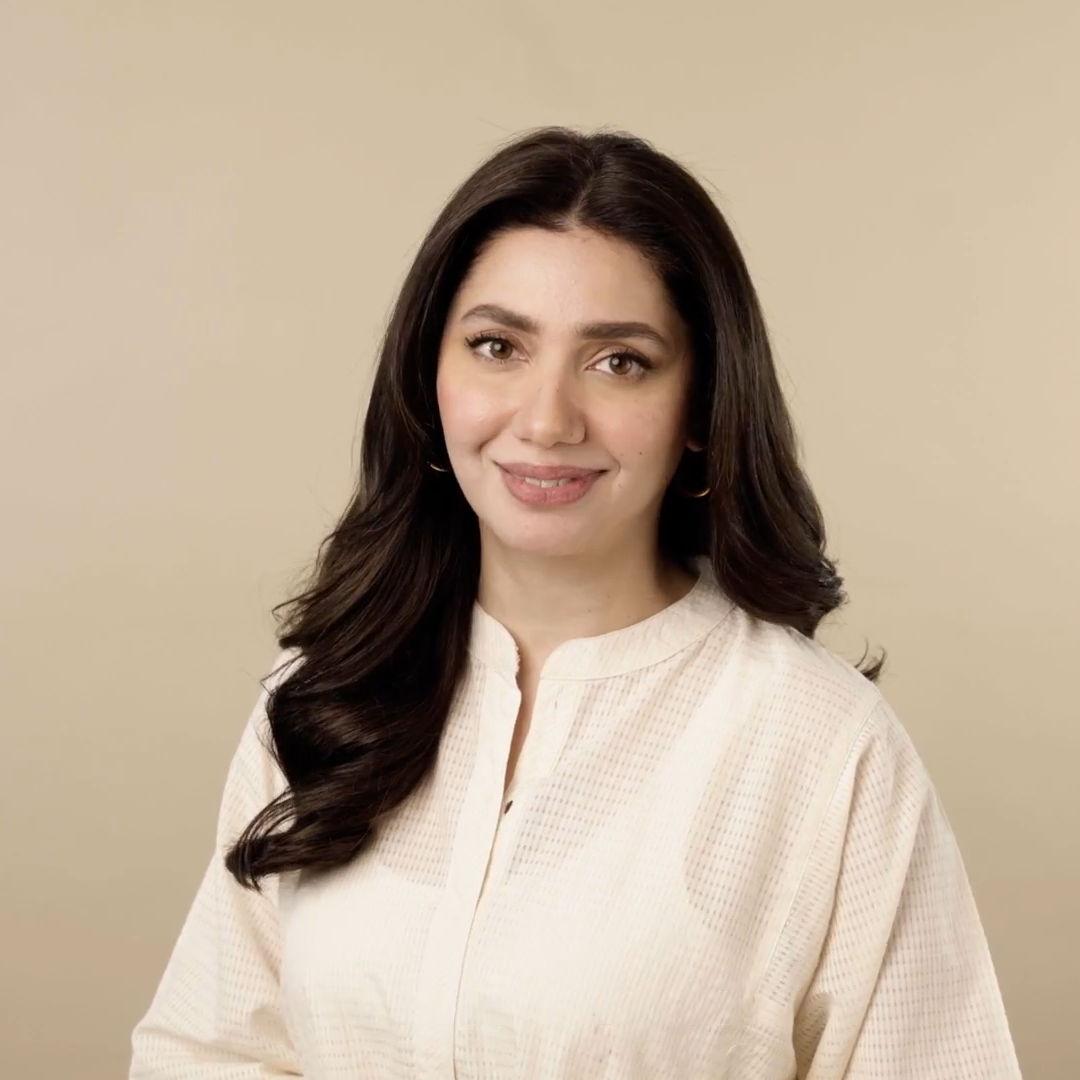
- Khan in 2024
- Born: Mahira Hafeez Khan; 21 December 1984 (age 41); Karachi, Sindh, Pakistan
- Education: Santa Monica College
- Occupation: Actress
- Years active: 2006–present
- Spouse: Ali Askari (m. 2007; div. 2015) Salim Karim (m. 2023)
- Children: 1

Mahira Hafeez Khan (pronounced [maɦiːraː hafiːz kʰan]; born 21 December 1984) is a Pakistani actress known for her work in films and television. One of the highest-paid actresses in Pakistan, she has received several accolades, including seven Lux Style Awards and eight Hum Awards.

After working as a video jockey for various television shows, Khan made her acting debut in 2011 with a supporting role in Shoaib Mansoor's blockbuster social drama Bol (2011). She then played a troubled wife in the highly successful romantic television drama Humsafar (2011), which won her the Lux Style Award for Best Television Actress. She gained wider recognition for portraying a range of unconventional characters in several top-rated television series, including the spiritual drama Shehr-e-Zaat (2012), the biographical romance Sadqay Tumhare (2014), the romantic drama Bin Roye (2016), the psychological thriller Hum Kahan Ke Sachay Thay (2021), and the revenge period drama Mitti De Baway (2026), all of which earned her multiple Best Actress awards and nominations.

Khan established herself by starring as the female lead in two of Pakistan's highest-grossing productions, the 2015 romantic drama Bin Roye and the 2016 coming-of-age musical drama Ho Mann Jahaan. Her first project in Hindi cinema came with the crime thriller Raees (2017), which ranks among the highest-grossing Indian films of 2017. She received critical acclaim for her portrayal of a rape victim in the revenge drama Verna (2017), and an aspiring actress in the musical drama Superstar (2019). After a short break, she appeared in the 2022 action films Quaid-e-Azam Zindabad and The Legend of Maula Jatt, both of which became major box-office successes. Her subsequent releases, Love Guru (2025) and Aag Lagay Basti Mein (2026), both became among the highest-grossing Pakistani films of all time, further establishing her as a leading figure in the country's commercial cinema. She also produced the sports-based web series Baarwan Khiladi (2022).

Outside of acting, Khan supports social causes related to women's rights and the refugee crisis. She has worked with UNICEF since 2019 and was appointed as the national and global UNICEF Goodwill Ambassador for Afghan refugees in Pakistan the same year. She has also co-hosted several award ceremonies and is a prominent celebrity endorser for major brands and products. Khan is known to be private about her personal life, which often attracts media attention.

== Early life and education ==
Mahira Khan was born on 21 December 1984 into a Muhajir family in Karachi, Sindh, Pakistan. In an online interview with Reham Khan, she said that her parents are Urdu-speaking Pathans. Her father, Hafeez Khan, was born in Delhi during the British Raj and migrated to Pakistan after the partition of India. She has a younger brother, Hissan Khan, who is a journalist and entrepreneur.

She received her early education at Foundation Public School, where she completed her A-Levels. At the age of seventeen, she moved to California in the United States for higher education and enrolled at Santa Monica College. Mahira was the first woman in her family to travel abroad alone. She later said that living in the United States on her own helped her become "strong and independent." She then enrolled at the University of Southern California for a master's degree in English literature. During this period, she worked part-time as a cashier at Rite Aid. Reflecting on the experience, she said: "I used to mop floors, clean floors, run the till and shut the store at night." After completing her first year, Khan decided to pursue her interest in acting and left her studies, returning to Pakistan.

== Career ==
=== Early work (2006–2011) ===
Khan began her career in 2006 as a video jockey at MTV Pakistan, where she hosted the live show Most Wanted five days a week. She later hosted Weekend with Mahira on AAG TV in 2008, which featured interviews with celebrities.

In 2011, she made her film debut with a supporting role in Bol, directed by Shoaib Mansoor. She played Ayesha, a friend of the lead character, and the film became one of Pakistan's highest-grossing films at the time. The success of the film marked her transition from television presenter to actor.

=== Breakthrough and television success (2011–2016) ===
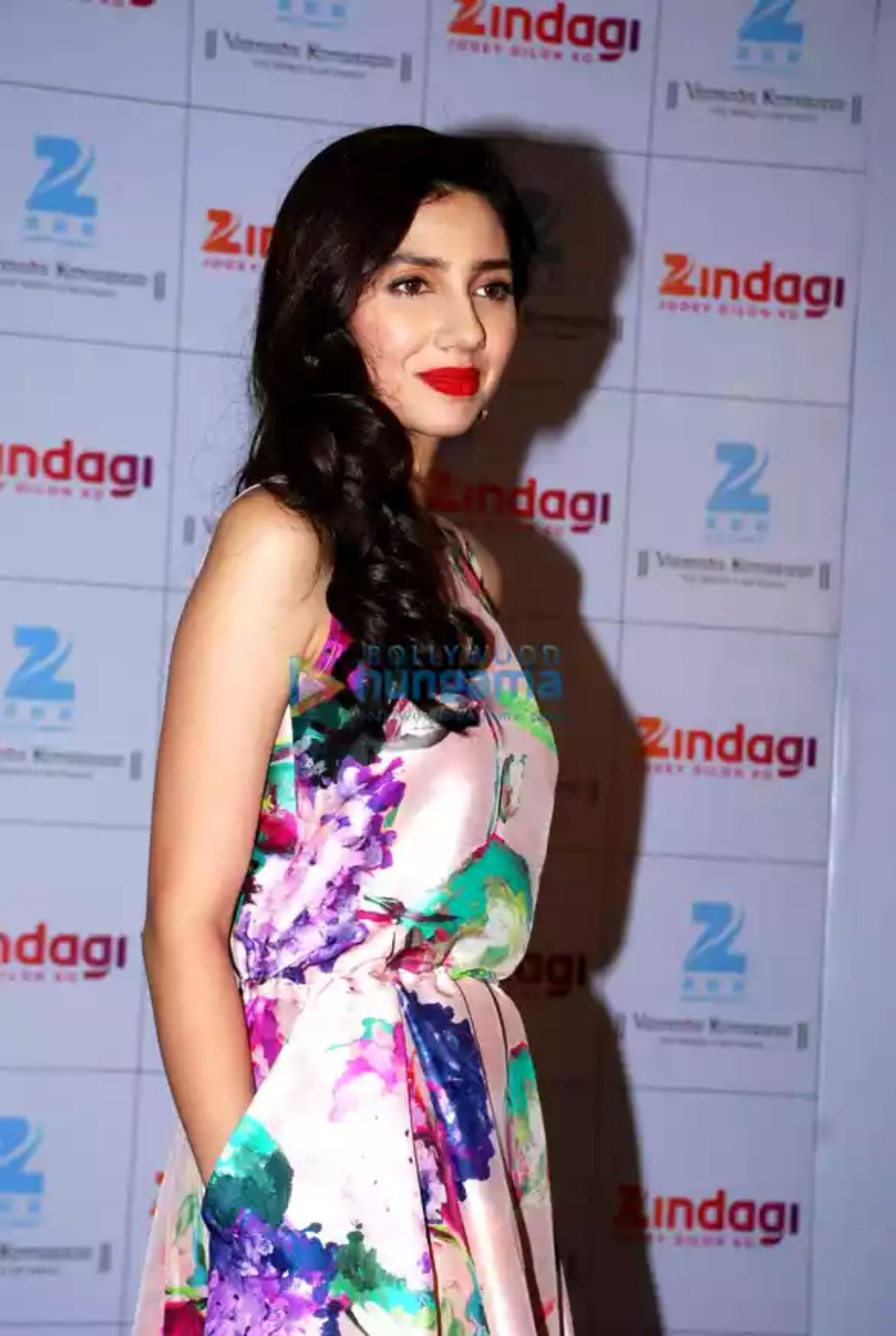
Khan at an event for Zindagi TV in 2016

Khan gained nationwide fame with the television drama Humsafar (2011), in which she played Khirad Ehsan opposite Fawad Khan. The serial, based on Farhat Ishtiaq's novel, became a cultural phenomenon in Pakistan and among South Asian audiences abroad. Her performance earned her the Lux Style Award for Best Television Actress and established her as a leading name in Pakistani television.

Following the success of Humsafar, she starred in the spiritual romance Shehr-e-Zaat (2012), portraying Falak, a woman on a journey of self-discovery and faith. The serial received critical acclaim and earned her the Hum Award for Best Actress.

In 2014, she appeared in the biographical romance Sadqay Tumhare, written by Khalil-ur-Rehman Qamar, playing Shano. The drama, based on Qamar's real-life love story, was another success and earned her the Hum Award for Best Actress.

Her next major television appearance was Bin Roye (2016), adapted from Farhat Ishtiaq's novel of the same name. She reprised her film role for the serial version, which became a commercial success and reinforced her reputation as one of Pakistan's leading actresses.

=== Film Stardom and Television Return (2015–present) ===
Khan made her return to cinema with Bin Roye (2015), opposite Humayun Saeed and Armeena Khan. The film was both critically and commercially successful, earning her the Lux Style Award for Best Actress (Film).

She next appeared in Ho Mann Jahaan (2016), a coming-of-age musical drama, alongside Adeel Hussain, Sheheryar Munawar, and Sonya Jehan. The film performed well at the box office and earned her another Lux Style Award for Best Actress (Film).

In 2017, she made her Hindi film debut in India with Rahul Dholakia's gangster action film Raees opposite Shah Rukh Khan. The film was a moderate commercial success, nonetheless, ranking among the highest-grossing Indian films of the year. Due to political tensions between India and Pakistan, she was unable to participate in the film’s promotional activities in India.

Later that year, she starred in the social-drama Verna, directed by Shoaib Mansoor, playing a rape survivor seeking justice. Her performance received widespread praise and a Lux Style Award for Best Actress (Film).

In the 2018 romantic comedy Saat Din Mohabbat In, Mahira Khan played Neeli, a wry and humorous mohallah girl, marking her first venture into the comedy genre. While the film received mixed reviews, with some critics praising her comic timing and versatility, others found the acting unconvincing. Despite the polarized reception, the film was a commercial success.

In 2019, she appeared in the romantic musical Superstar opposite Bilal Ashraf. The film was commercially successful and her performance was positively reviewed. She received Lux Style Award for Best Actress (Film) in both critics and viewers choice categories.

Mahira Khan returned to television in 2021 with Hum Kahan Ke Sachay Thay, ending a five-year hiatus with her role as Mehreen, a psychologically complex character. The drama, written by Umera Ahmed and directed by Farooq Rind, explored themes of trauma, abuse, and family politics. While the series received mixed reactions for its dark narrative, Khan's performance was widely praised for its depth, with critics calling her portrayal "sensational" and "incredible". The project reaffirmed her ability to anchor challenging, emotionally demanding roles. Mahira Khan also starred in the telefilm Aik Hai Nigar, a biopic of Lieutenant General Nigar Johar, Pakistan's first female three-star general. The film was released on October 23, 2021, and was directed by Adnan Sarwar, with a script by Umera Ahmed. Mahira Khan also co-produced the project, describing it as an "honour" to portray a woman she deeply admired.

After a brief hiatus, she returned to the screen in 2022 with Quaid-e-Azam Zindabad, an action-comedy film opposite Fahad Mustafa, which became one of the year's highest-grossing Pakistani films.

The same year, she starred in the epic action film The Legend of Maula Jatt alongside Fawad Khan, Hamza Ali Abbasi, and Humaima Malick. The film became the highest-grossing Pakistani film of all time and was lauded for its production, direction, and performances. Khan's portrayal of Mukkho received widespread praise from both critics and audiences. She also appeared as the narrator in Razia, a 2023 socio-comedy mini series.

In 2025, Mahira Khan starred in two major film releases. The romantic comedy Love Guru, directed by Nadeem Baig and co-starring Humayun Saeed, emerged as the year's biggest commercial success, earning over Rs. 8 billion globally and setting new box office benchmarks. Her second film, Neelofar, directed by Ammar Rasool, was a romantic drama where she played a blind girl opposite Fawad Khan. This marked their third on-screen collaboration together following their appearances in Humsafar and The Legend of Maula Jatt.. The film was praised for its poetic storytelling, visual aesthetics, and the chemistry between the leads.

In 2026, Mahira starred in Aag Lagay Basti Mein, which became the second highest-grossing Pakistani film of all time by crossing the Rs. 100 crore mark worldwide. This achievement means Mahira Khan now stars in three of the top-grossing Pakistani films, alongside The Legend of Maula Jatt and Love Guru, solidifying her position as a leading figure in the country's commercial cinema. Mahira Khan received positive response for her performance as Billo in Mitti De Baway, a character who transforms from a lovestruck young woman into a ruthless, authoritative spiritual guide. Critics and audiences praised her nuanced portrayal of a figure who is both victim and oppressor. In addition to starring opposite Wahaj Ali, she also produced the period revenge saga, which aired on Green Entertainment.

=== Other work ===
Apart from acting, Khan has also worked as a singer and producer. She once mentioned that director Shoaib Mansoor encouraged her to sing for his film Verna (2017).

In 2021, she started her own company, Soul Fry Films, and produced the web series Baarwan Khiladi (2022) with Nina Kashif.

She has also appeared in brand campaigns and spoken about the importance of Pakistan–India collaborations in film and local digital content.

== Personal life and off-screen work ==
While studying in the United States, Khan met businessman Ali Askari in 2005. She moved back to Pakistan the following year and married him in 2007. The couple have a son, Azlaan, who was born in 2010. Khan and Askari divorced in 2015 and share custody of their son. In 2019, she began dating entrepreneur Salim Karim, which she confirmed in an online interview with Hassan Sheheryar Yasin in 2020. She married Karim in an intimate ceremony on 2 October 2023 in Bhurban. In September 2026, Khan announced that she is pregnant with her and Karim's first child.

Khan has also taken part in charitable work. She visited Dubai (along with Maya Ali and then Prime Minister Imran Khan) and Los Angeles to raise funds for the Shaukat Khanum Memorial Hospital in 2018 and 2019. She has worked with the UNICEF since 2019, and was appointed as a national and global UNICEF Goodwill Ambassador for Afghan refugees in Pakistan in the same year. Her work was praised by the UN Secretary-General António Guterres during his visit to Pakistan in February 2020. Khan often speaks on issues such as women's rights, child safety, and gender-based violence. On Women's Day in 2020, she collaborated with Shoaib Mansoor on the music video "Dua-e-Reem". The song, a modern take on Lab Pe Aati Hai Dua by Allama Iqbal, was set in the pre-partition era and featured her as a young woman reflecting on justice and equality after marriage. The song was widely praised and became popular across the Indian subcontinent.

In 2018, Khan and her brother Hissan launched a clothing line, Mashion!. Later that year, the two founded a media platform of the same name that focuses on empowering women and spreading awareness about mental health in Pakistan. In 2020, she hosted Khandani Kitchen, a YouTube show by Mashion featuring male celebrities cooking traditional dishes. In September 2020, she joined the Commonwealth of Nations campaign "No More", raising awareness about sexual and domestic violence.

On 6 November 2024, Khan received the Lifetime Achievement Award from the UK Parliament for her work as a cultural ambassador and her contributions to women's empowerment.

== Media image ==
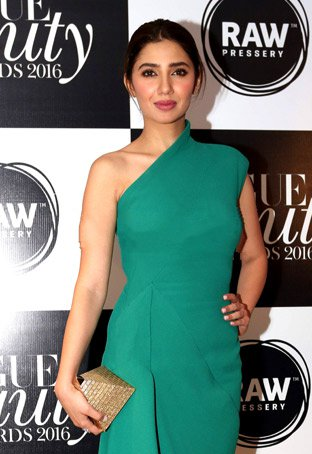
Khan at the Vogue Beauty Awards in 2016

Khan is considered as one of Pakistan's most popular and highest-paid actresses. She has received several awards and nominations for her acting and fashion work. In 2012, Khan was named the Most Beautiful Woman in Pakistan, and in 2020, she was listed as the 18th "Most Beautiful Woman in the World" by Stylecraze magazine. In Eastern Eye magazine's annual "Sexiest Asian Women" poll, she ranked tenth in 2015, ninth in 2016, fifth in 2017, fourth in 2018, and ninth in 2019. She is among the most followed Pakistani celebrities on Instagram and Twitter. Khan has hosted several major award shows, including the Lux Style Awards in 2010 and 2015, and the Hum Awards in 2013. In December 2016, she became the subject of false online reports after fabricated anti-India comments were circulated ahead of the release of her Bollywood film Raees.

Khan has served as an ambassador for several national and international brands, including Lux, QMobile, Gai Power Wash, TUC, Huawei, Sunsilk, Veet, and L'Oréal. She is also known for representing Pakistan at major international platforms. In 2018, she represented Pakistan at the Cannes Film Festival, and the following year became the first Pakistani actor to walk at the Paris Fashion Week. In 2019, she was appointed the brand ambassador of Peshawar Zalmi, a cricket franchise in the Pakistan Super League (PSL). That same year, she received the Best International Icon Award at the Dubai International Film Festival.

== Filmography ==
=== Films ===
Key
†	Denotes films that have not yet been released

Year	Title	Role	Director	Notes	Ref(s)
2011	Bol	Ayesha Khan	Shoaib Mansoor		
2015	Bin Roye	Saba Shafiq	Shahzad Kashmiri		
2015	Manto	Madaran	Sarmad Khoosat	Special appearance in song "Kya Hoga"	
2016	Ho Mann Jahaan	Manizeh	Asim Raza		
2016	Actor in Law	Herself	Nabeel Qureshi	Special appearance	
2017	Raees	Aasiya Qazi	Rahul Dholakia	Hindi film	
2017	Verna	Sara	Shoaib Mansoor		
2018	7 Din Mohabbat In	Neeli	Farjad–Meenu		
2019	Parey Hut Love	Zeena	Asim Raza	Cameo appearance	
2019	Superstar	Noor	Mohammed Ehteshamuddin		
2022	Quaid-e-Azam Zindabad	Jia	Nabeel Qureshi		
2022	The Legend of Maula Jatt	Mukhoo Jatti	Bilal Lashari	Punjabi Film	
2025	Love Guru	Sophia Khan	Nadeem Baig		
2025	Neelofar	Neelofar	Ammar Rasool		
2026	Aag Lagay Basti Mein	Almas	Bilal Atif Khan		
TBA	Mirza Jatt †	TBA	Nadeem Baig		

=== Television ===
Year	Title	Role	Network	Director	Notes	Ref(s)
2011	Neeyat	Ayla	ARY Digital	Mehreen Jabbar	Television Debut	
2011	Humsafar	Khirad Ehsan	Hum TV	Sarmad Khoosat		
2012	Shehr-e-Zaat	Falak	Hum TV	Sarmad Khoosat		
2012	Coke Kahani	Herself	Broadcast Syndication	Mehreen Jabbar	Special appearance	
2014	The Lighter Side of Life	Host	Hum TV	Sabiha Sumar		
2014	Sadqay Tumhare	Rukhsana "Shano" Amin	Hum TV	Mohammed Ehteshamuddin		
2016	Bin Roye	Saba Shafiq	Hum TV	Haissam Hussain		
2017	Main Manto	Madari	Geo Entertainment	Sarmad Khoosat	Cameo	
2021	Hum Kahan Ke Sachay Thay	Mehreen Mansoor	Hum TV	Farooq Rind		
2022	Baarwan Khiladi	—N/a	Express Entertainment	Adnan Sarwar	Web-series; Producer only	
2023	Razia	Razia	Express Entertainment	Mohsin Ali		
2026	Mitti De Baway	Billo	Green Entertainment	Syed Wajahat Hussain		

=== Telefilms ===
Year	Title	Role	Network	Director	Notes	Ref(s)
2021	Aik Hai Nigar	Nigar Johar	ARY Digital	Adnan Sarwar	Biopic	
2023	Budhi Ghori Lal Lagam	Herself	Geo Entertainment	Sheheryar Munawar	Special appearance	
TBA	Woh Ek Raat †	TBA	Hum TV	Shehzad Kashmiri		

=== Web series ===
Year	Title	Role	Network	Director	Notes	Ref(s)
2020	Churails	Shagufta	Zee5	Asim Abbasi	Cameo	
TBA	Jo Bachay Hain Sang Samait Lo †	Rahat	Netflix	Momina Duraid		

== Awards and nominations ==
Year	Award	Category	Work	Result	Ref(s)
2013	12th Lux Style Awards	Best Television Actress - Satellite	Humsafar	Won	
2013	Pakistan Media Awards	Best Actress - Drama	Humsafar	Won	
2013	1st Hum Awards	Best On-screen Couple (with Fawad Khan)	Humsafar	Won	
2013	1st Hum Awards	Best Actress	Shehr-e-Zaat	Won	
2013	1st Hum Awards	Best On-screen Couple (with Mikaal Zulfikar)	Shehr-e-Zaat	Nominated	
2014	Pakistan Media Awards	Best Actress - Drama	Shehr-e-Zaat	Won	
2015	3rd Hum Awards	Best Actress - Jury	Sadqay Tumhare	Nominated	
2015	3rd Hum Awards	Best Actress - Popular	Sadqay Tumhare	Won	
2015	3rd Hum Awards	Best On-screen Couple (with Adnan Malik)	Sadqay Tumhare	Won	
2015	Masala! Awards	Best Actress	Bin Roye	Won	
2016	15th Lux Style Awards	Best Television Actress	Sadqay Tumhare	Won	
2016	15th Lux Style Awards	Best Actress	Bin Roye	Won	
2016	4th Hum Awards	Recognition Award - Films (with Humayun Saeed)	Bin Roye	Won	
2016	1st Hum Style Awards	Most Stylish Actress (Film)	Bin Roye	Won	
2016	Vogue Beauty Awards	Face to Watch Out For	—N/a	Won	
2017	5th Hum Awards	Best Actress - Jury	Bin Roye	Nominated	
2017	5th Hum Awards	Best Actress - Popular	Bin Roye	Won	
2017	5th Hum Awards	Best On-screen Couple - Jury (with Humayun Saeed)	Bin Roye	Nominated	
2017	5th Hum Awards	Best On-screen Couple - Popular (with Humayun Saeed)	Bin Roye	Nominated	
2017	16th Lux Style Awards	Best Actress	Ho Mann Jahaan	Won	
2017	Nigar Awards	Best Actress	Ho Mann Jahaan	Nominated	
2017	2nd Hum Style Awards	Most Stylish Actress (Television)	Bin Roye	Nominated	
2017	Masala! Awards	Asian Woman of Substance	—N/a	Won	
2017	Beirut International Film Festival	Best International Star	—N/a	Won	
2018	6th Hum Awards	Recognition Award - Films	Verna	Won	
2018	17th Lux Style Awards	Best Actress	Verna	Won	
2018	3rd Hum Style Awards	Most Stylish Actress (Film)	Verna	Nominated	
2018	3rd Hum Style Awards	Style Icon of the Year	—N/a	Won	
2018	Bollywood Film Journalist Awards	Best Female Debut	Raees	Nominated	
2019	DIAFA Awards	International Icon Award	For contribution to Film and Television	Won	
2020	19th Lux Style Awards	Best Film Actress (Viewers' Choice)	Superstar	Won	
2020	19th Lux Style Awards	Best Film Actress (Critics' Choice)	Superstar	Won	
2020	4th Hum Style Awards	Most Stylish Actress (Film)	Superstar	Won	
2022	8th Hum Awards	Best Actress - Jury	Hum Kahan Ke Sachay Thay	Nominated	
2022	8th Hum Awards	Best Actress - Popular	Hum Kahan Ke Sachay Thay	Nominated	
2022	8th Hum Awards	Best On-screen Couple - Jury (with Usman Mukhtar)	Hum Kahan Ke Sachay Thay	Nominated	
2022	8th Hum Awards	Best On-screen Couple - Popular (with Usman Mukhtar)	Hum Kahan Ke Sachay Thay	Nominated	
2022	21st Lux Style Awards	Best Television Actress (Viewers' Choice)	Hum Kahan Ke Sachay Thay	Nominated	
2022	21st Lux Style Awards	Best Television Actress (Critics' Choice)	Hum Kahan Ke Sachay Thay	Nominated	
2022	Septimius Award	Best Asian Actress	Aik Hai Nigar	Nominated	
2023	22nd Lux Style Awards	Best Film Actress	Quaid-e-Azam Zindabad	Nominated	
2023	1st Kya Drama Hai Icon Awards	Best Supporting Actress (Mini-Series)	Razia	Won	
2024	EMIGALA Fashion & Beauty Awards	Artist in Fashion	—N/a	Won	
2024	UK Parliament	Lifetime Achievement Award	For contribution to Film and Television	Won	
2025	10th Hum Awards	Recognition Award - Films (with Humayun Saeed)	Love Guru	Won	
