= Aamir Raza Husain =

Indian actor and director (1957–2023)

- Born: 6 January 1957; Lucknow, Uttar Pradesh, India
- Died: 3 June 2023 (aged 66); Delhi, India
- Occupations: Theatre director, actor
- Years active: 1974–2023

Aamir Raza Husain (6 January 1957 – 3 June 2023) was an Indian theatre actor and director, noted for his large outdoor stage productions like The Fifty Day War (2000), based on the Kargil War, and The Legend of Ram (2004), based on the epic Ramayana. He was also the creative director of Stagedoor, a theatre company established in 1974, which has staged over 91 productions and more than 1,100 performances.

Husain was awarded the Padma Shri in 2001 by the Government of India.

== Early life and education ==
Born in the Awadhi aristocratic family of Mumtaz Husain and Kaniz Mehida in Lucknow, Husain was an only child. The family moved to SP Marg in Delhi when he was still quite young, and he attended the Garden School there.

Husain was sent to Mayo College, a boarding school, at age ten in 1968, and after he finished his schooling, he went on to study history at St. Stephen's College, Delhi. He acted in various college plays, working with directors such as Joy Michael, Barry John, and Marcus Murch.

== Career ==
Husain also appeared in the English film Kim (1984), starring Peter O'Toole and based on Rudyard Kipling's novel Kim. Over the years, he produced several plays staged at outdoor locations, such as Sare Jahan Se Acha, 1947 Live, and in 1999. Satyamev Jayate, which used the Hauz Khas monument as a backdrop. In 1998, he and his troupe, along with Delhi Tourism, organized the Chaudvin ka Chand festival between the historic Red Fort and Fatehpuri Mosque in Chandni Chowk, Old Delhi.

The Legend of Ram, based on the epic Ramayana, was first staged in 1994, and later for a period of four months in 2004 on a much larger scale with 19 outdoor sets spread over three acres, 35 characters and a 100-member crew. The last show of the play was performed before President APJ Abdul Kalam on 1 May 2004. In 2007, he acted and directed One into Two, a comedy play written by Peter Season, which was staged in five cities across India, including Mumbai.

In 2010, he revived his production Move Over, first staged at the official farewell of President Shankar Dayal Sharma in 1997, under the banner of "Welcomtheatre." it was performed in Delhi, Mumbai, Kolkata and many other cities in India.

== Politics ==
Aamir Raza Husain was once a member of the BJP. He was the Delhi BJP vice president until July 2013, resigning after criticizing Narendra Modi.

== Personal life and death ==
Husain was based in Delhi. He married actress Viraat Talwar in 1993 after the two met in 1987 when Talwar, a student at Lady Shri Ram College for Women (LSR), auditioned for his play Dangerous Liaison. It was also her first professional role. The couple had two children, Kaniz Sukaina and Ghulam Ali Abbas.

Aamir Raza Husain died in Delhi on 3 June 2023 at the age of 66.
