= Hum Kahan Ke Sachay Thay =

Pakistani drama television serial

- Official title card
- Genre: Drama, Psychological Thriller, Mystery
- Based on: Hum Kahan Ke Sachay Thay by Umera Ahmad
- Written by: Umera Ahmad
- Directed by: Farooq Rind
- Starring: Mahira Khan; Kubra Khan; Usman Mukhtar
- Composer: Azaan Sami Khan
- Country of origin: Pakistan
- Original language: Urdu
- No. of seasons: 1
- No. of episodes: 22

Production
- Executive producer: Momina Duraid
- Producer: Nina Kashif
- Cinematography: Jibran Rind
- Running time: 40 minutes
- Production companies: MD Productions; Soul Fry Films

Original release
- Network: Hum TV
- Release: 1 August 2021 – 2 January 2022

Hum Kahan Ke Sachay Thay (Urdu: ہم کہاں کے سچے تھے) (English literal: As if we were truthful) is a Pakistani drama television series based on the novel of the same name by Umera Ahmad. Directed by Farooq Rind, the serial is co-produced by Soul Fry Films and MD Productions. It features Mahira Khan, Usman Mukhtar, and Kubra Khan in lead roles. It premiered on 1 August 2021 on Hum TV.

The series received mixed to negative reviews throughout its broadcast, however, gained praise for its premise and performances of the leads while receiving negative reviews for glorification of toxicity.

== Plot ==
Aswad Ayub (Usman Mukhtar), Mehreen Mansoor (Mahira Khan), and Mashal Tahir (Kubra Khan) are three cousins. Aswad is humble and friendly and close to both Mashal and Mehreen. Mashal is beautiful and rich, and Mehreen is poor and average-looking in appearance. All three were best friends in their childhood. Mehreen's maternal grandmother hates her because her father is a drug addict. One day, Mehreen's dad Mansoor (Omair Rana) gets caught by his wife Rabia (Laila Wasti) for fraud and stealing her jewellery to buy drugs. She leaves him, threatening him that she will take Mehreen with her. Mansoor, who loves Mehreen very much, is unable to tolerate the idea of his daughter being away from him forever and commits suicide by heroin overdose. Mashal overhears her parents Tahir (Ali Tahir) and Shagufta (Zainab Qayyum) saying that Mansoor is a drug addict and says so to Mehreen, causing them to argue and begin to hate each other.

Rabia remarries and begins to neglect Mehreen because her stepfather does not want to keep her. Mehreen moves in with Mashal's parents and her paternal grandmother, who lives with them. Everybody hates her. She lives a lonely life; however, she is academically and artistically smart and does not let anyone bully her into submission. With the loss of her parents, she has no support, except for her aunt Saleha Ayub (Huma Nawab), who is Aswad's mother. She loves to debate and is a talented artist, often achieving first place at art competitions. Her friends admire her, making Mashal envious. Saleha is the sole person who knows Mehreen's reality and loves her dearly, like a daughter.

Mashal is the complete opposite of Mehreen. She is extremely beautiful but not very bright in her academics. Nor is she artistic in nature. Shagufta continuously tells Mashal to 'be like Mehreen', giving her an inferiority complex. She consequently becomes obsessed with Mehreen, wanting to be her. She sneaks into Mehreen's room and reads her diaries, trying to find out more about Mehreen's likes, dislikes, and lifestyle. She also finds out how much Mehreen hates her.

All this while, Mashal is in close contact with Aswad who lives in America. She is jealous because he still likes Mehreen, and feeds him false information about her, claiming that she smokes and has many boyfriends. She also often claims Mehreen's academic and artistic victories as her own. Aswad gets brainwashed by Mashal and begins to dislike Mehreen, thinking that his once-best friend is going rogue.

Mehreen’s friend's cousin, Saffwan (Haroon Shahid), becomes romantically interested in Mehreen. Mashal finds out about this and tells Saffwan about Mehreen's past including her father's drug addiction. This creates a misunderstanding between Saffwan and Mehreen. However, Saffwan comes to realize that it was all Mashal's doing. He proposes to Mehreen. Mehreen rejects him, saying that he doesn't know anything about her past and once he does, he will hate her like the others.

Meanwhile, Saleha declares that she wants Mehreen to marry Aswad, saying it has been her longtime wish. Mehreen does not object, having secretly been in love with Aswad all along. Mashal decides to tell Aswad that she loves him and wants to marry him. Aswad, who also likes Mashal, agrees and tells his mother he wants to marry Mashal and not Mehreen, but Saleha rejects Mashal and insists that only Mehreen can be his wife. Aswad tells Mashal that he can not marry her. This breaks Mashal's heart but she tells Aswad that she forgives him and wants him to be happy. But she secretly tries to persuade Mehreen not to marry Aswad. She tears Mehreen's wedding veil to try to dissuade her. Mehreen gets annoyed with Mashal. The same night, Mashal is found dead in her room. Everyone blames Mehreen for her murder, and she is arrested. Shabbo, their maid, knows exactly what happened that night but doesn't speak up. Due to the trauma of being falsely accused, Mehreen starts to hallucinate about her father in jail.

Mehreen is soon bailed out as Saleha arranges a lawyer for her. Tahir and Shagufta aren't happy about Mehreen getting released, as they still think that Mehreen poisoned Mashal. Aswad also thinks that Mehreen killed Mashal and behaves rudely towards her. He marries Mehreen, and starts to emotionally abuse her, blaming her for killing Mashal. This makes Mehreen's mental state deteriorate, and she starts hallucinating about Mashal, who tells Mehreen that she should kill herself and says that that is what Aswad wants too. After a series of events, Aswad forces Mehreen to sign an affidavit, stating that she killed Mashal. But the stress of the false statement gives Mehreen a nervous breakdown, and she has to be admitted to the hospital.

The psychiatrist tells Aswad that some great stress has brought Mehreen to this state. Aswad starts to feel guilty for mentally torturing Mehreen. Shagufta calls Aswad to inform him that she is going to dispose of Mehreen's things, which are still in her house. Aswad goes to collect them and is shocked to see Mehreen's awards and paintings. He remembers how Mashal used to show off the awards, realising that they were Mehreen's all along. Shabbo, who cannot keep the secret anymore, spills everything and unveils Mehreen's innocence. She tells Aswad that it was Mashal who was not bright in her studies, it was Mashal who smoked. Aswad regrets his behaviour towards Mehreen. He asks Shabbo what really happened on the night Mashal died. Shabbo says that Mashal tried to kill Mehreen, but Shabbo accidentally put sleeping pills in Mashal's cup instead of Mehreen's. Aswad is shocked to hear this.

He goes home and, upon reading Mehreen's diary, realises he has been falsely accusing her all along. He goes to the hospital to apologize to Mehreen, but she refuses to listen and asks for a divorce. Aswad pleads for her to listen to him and tells her about everything he has discovered. Mehreen gives further details about that night, saying that while Shabbo prepared tea, Mashal and Mehreen talked to each other. They hated each other because their parents' familial politics had broken them apart. Mashal confessed to Mehreen about her mother forcing her to be like her. Both of them realised that they had been manipulated into fighting with each other and reconciled. When Shabbo brought tea Mashal remembered that she had ordered Shabbo to put pills in Mehreen's cup. As she no longer wanted Mehreen to die, she threw Mehreen's cup to the ground, breaking it. Not knowing that the pills were actually in her own cup, Mashal drank her tea. They both apologised to each other and, not knowing that it would be the last night Mashal would be alive, said they would talk properly the next day.

Aswad is shocked after hearing this and asks Mehreen for forgiveness, promising to love her like he did in his childhood. Mehreen forgives Aswad, and they finally reconcile.

Later, Mehreen continues her incomplete degree with full support from Aswad, and they start a new life together.

== Cast ==
=== Main ===
- Mahira Khan as Mehreen Aswad (nee Mansoor) : Rabia and Mansoor's daughter; Anum and Tooba's half sister; Aswad's wife.
  - Tehreem Ali Hameed as Mehreen Mansoor (young)
- Usman Mukhtar as Aswad Ayub: Saleha and Ayub's son; Mehreen's husband.
  - Zohair Siddiqui as Aswad Ayub (young)
- Kubra Khan as Mashal Tahir (Dead) : Shagufta and Tahir's daughter.
  - Minahil Naveed as Mashal Tahir (young)

=== Recurring ===
- Zainab Qayyum as Shagufta Tahir : Tahir's wife; Mashal's mother.
- Ali Tahir as Tahir Hafeez: Shagufta's husband; Rabia and Saleha's brother; Mashal's father.
- Huma Nawab as Saleha Ayub : Aswad's mother; Tahir and Rabia's sister; Ayub's widow.
- Haroon Shahid as Safwan : Sheeba's cousin; Mehreen's suitor.
- Omair Rana as Mansoor Ali (Dead) : Rabia's husband; Mehreen's father.
- Shamim Hilaly as Nani : Rabia, Saleha and Tahir's mother.
- Laila Wasti as Rabia Nauman : Mansoor's widow; Nauman's wife; Saleha and Tahir's sister; Mehreen, Anum and Tooba's mother
- Annie Zaidi as Safwan's mother; Sheeba's aunt.
- Kaif Ghaznavi as Shabbo : Mashal's househelp.
  - Ameena Farooq as Shabbo (young)
- Nadia Hussain as Psychiatrist
- Zara Ahmad as Sheeba : Mehreen's best friend; Safwan's cousin
- Haya Khan as Anum Nauman : Rabia and Nauman's daughter; Tooba's sister; Mehreen's half sister.
- Sidra Khan as Tooba Nauman : Rabia and Nauman's daughter; Anum's sister; Mehreen's half sister.
- Khalid Malik as Police Inspector

== Production ==
The project was first announced by Zainab Qayyum in late-March 2021 who confirmed on Instagram being part of the serial along with Kubra Khan, directed by Farooq Rind. Omair Rana in an interview revealed that he is starring in a serial and Mahira Khan will return to television after five years with the same serial.

== Soundtrack ==
"Tere Bin"

Song by Yashal Shahid
- Language: Urdu
- Released: 3 August 2021
- Genre: Soundtrack
- Length: 3:51
- Composer: Azaan Sami Khan
- Lyricist: Sabir Zafar
- Producer: Alex Shahbaz

Official video
- Hum Kahan Ke Sachay Thay - OST on YouTube

== Reception ==
=== Critical reception ===
While reviewing the first episode, Haneena Moosa of The Daily Times wrote, "The drama begins with a very powerful dialogue, delivered by one of the drama’s protagonists, Aswad". She further praised the premise and subject of the serial. Critics praised the premise and acting performances of the series.

While writing for The News International, Maheen Zia termed some of the events regarding the character Aswad as unrealistic. Another reviewer of the newspaper called it out for the glorification of toxic relationships. A reviewer from DAWN Images praised the performances of the actors and introduction of mental therapy in the plot, but mentioned the toxicity of Mukhtar's character and suicide portrayal as the negative aspect. Jasir Shahbaz of The Friday Times critiqued the series for perpetuating the trope of romantic relationships between cousins, argues that this portrayal romanticizes and reinforces the practice of cousin marriages, limiting women's ambitions and agency. Due to the dragging storyline and slow pace, the series also gathered criticism from viewers and critics.

=== Television rating ===
Ep#	Date	TRP(s)	Rank#
6	5 September 2021	5.7	1
11	10 October 2021	8.7	1
12	17 October 2021	6.0	1
15	14 November 2021	6.2	1
16	21 November 2021	6.1	1
17	28 November 2021	6.9	1
18	5 December 2021	8.6	1
19	12 December 2021	8.5	1
22	2 January 2022	8.3	1

== Awards and nominations ==
Date of ceremony	Awards	Category	Recipient	Result	Ref.
November 24, 2022	Lux Style Awards	Best TV Director	Farooq Rind	Nominated	
November 24, 2022	Lux Style Awards	Best TV Actress-Viewers' Choice	Mahira Khan	Nominated	
November 24, 2022	Lux Style Awards	Best TV Actress-Critics' Choice	Kubra Khan	Nominated	
November 24, 2022	Lux Style Awards	Best TV Actress-Critics' Choice	Mahira Khan	Nominated	
November 24, 2022	Lux Style Awards	Best TV Track	Yashal Shahid & Azaan Sami Khan	Nominated	
September 24, 2022	Hum Awards	Best Drama Serial - Popular	Nina Kashif and Momina Duraid	Nominated	
September 24, 2022	Hum Awards	Best Actress - Popular	Mahira Khan	Nominated	
September 24, 2022	Hum Awards	Best Actor - Popular	Usman Mukhtar	Nominated	
September 24, 2022	Hum Awards	Best Original Soundtrack	Nina Kashif, Momina Duraid and Azaan Sami Khan	Nominated	
