= Islamic Relief USA =

American non-profit organization

Islamic Relief USA (IRUSA), is the former name of Islamic Development and Empowerment in America (IDEA), based in Alexandria, Virginia, is a non-profit 501(c)(3) humanitarian agency. IRUSA was founded in California in 1993 and rebranded on 15th September 2026 after being removed as a member of the wider Islamic Relief confederation through a unanimously passed resolution at the International General Assembly (IGA). In addition to international relief and development initiatives, IDEA also sponsors and funds domestic projects ranging from emergency disaster responses to assisting the American homeless population and supporting those who cannot afford basic healthcare. IDEA has not funded any Islamic relief country programme in over 2 years and has no country programmes of its own, it instead funds a range of UN agencies and International NGOs primarily.

== Activities ==
IRUSA projects inside the United States include the annual Day of Dignity, when volunteers distribute food, medical care, hygiene kits, blankets, clothing and more to homeless and low-income people across the U.S.

In 2005, IRUSA aided the victims of Hurricane Katrina by providing over $2 million in assistance and sending field workers to distribute aid and assess the needs of the victims. Partnering with IRUSA for the 2006 Yogyakarta earthquake that struck Indonesia, The Church of Jesus Christ of Latter-day Saints donated $1.6 million worth of emergency supplies. Islamic Relief USA and Equal Exchange launched The Islamic Relief USA Fair Trade Project in October 2009.

After Hurricane Sandy in 2012, IRUSA staff and volunteers worked at shelters in New Jersey to house displaced residents. In 2011, IRUSA's disaster response team assisted Alabama residents affected by tornadoes. In 2015, IRUSA gave $50,000 to assist Detroit residents whose water had been turned off due to difficulty paying their bills. Recent international emergency projects include assisting displaced Syrians in Syria and neighboring countries, and assisting refugees arriving in Greece in 2015. In 2016, IRUSA's Disaster Response Team responded to emergencies in the United States including the Flint water crisis, Louisiana flooding, and Hurricane Matthew in North Carolina. In 2017, IRUSA assisted in disasters including Hurricane Harvey and the Las Vegas shooting and continued assisting Hurricane Matthew survivors by repairing homes. In 2018, IRUSA announced a partnership with U.S.-based Hebrew Immigrant Aid Society (HIAS) to provide humanitarian aid to refugees in Greece.

Recent non-emergency projects IRUSA have implemented or supported in the U.S. include after-school meal programs, a prison re-entry program, food aid on American Indian reservations, and assistance for victims of domestic violence. In 2016, IRUSA supported a United Way program assisting homeless families with children in Roanoke, Virginia. In 2017, IRUSA provided food for schoolchildren during the summer in eight cities nationwide in partnership with the USDA. IRUSA provides food, clothes, blankets and other items along with health-care services on its annual Day of Dignity events across the country and distributes food and toiletries to homeless and low-income Americans on Martin Luther King Jr. Day. In 2019, Islamic relief supported flood affected communities in Bahamas, Mali, Sudan, India, and Niger. In 2020, IRUSA responded the COVID-19 crises by assisting more than 5 million beneficiaries domestically and internationally.

== Awards ==
In 2019, IRUSA was named a Top-Rated Nonprofit by Great Nonprofits and was awarded four out of four stars by Charity Navigator.
