= TUC (cracker) =

Brand of snack cracker

- TUC's logo, as of 2024

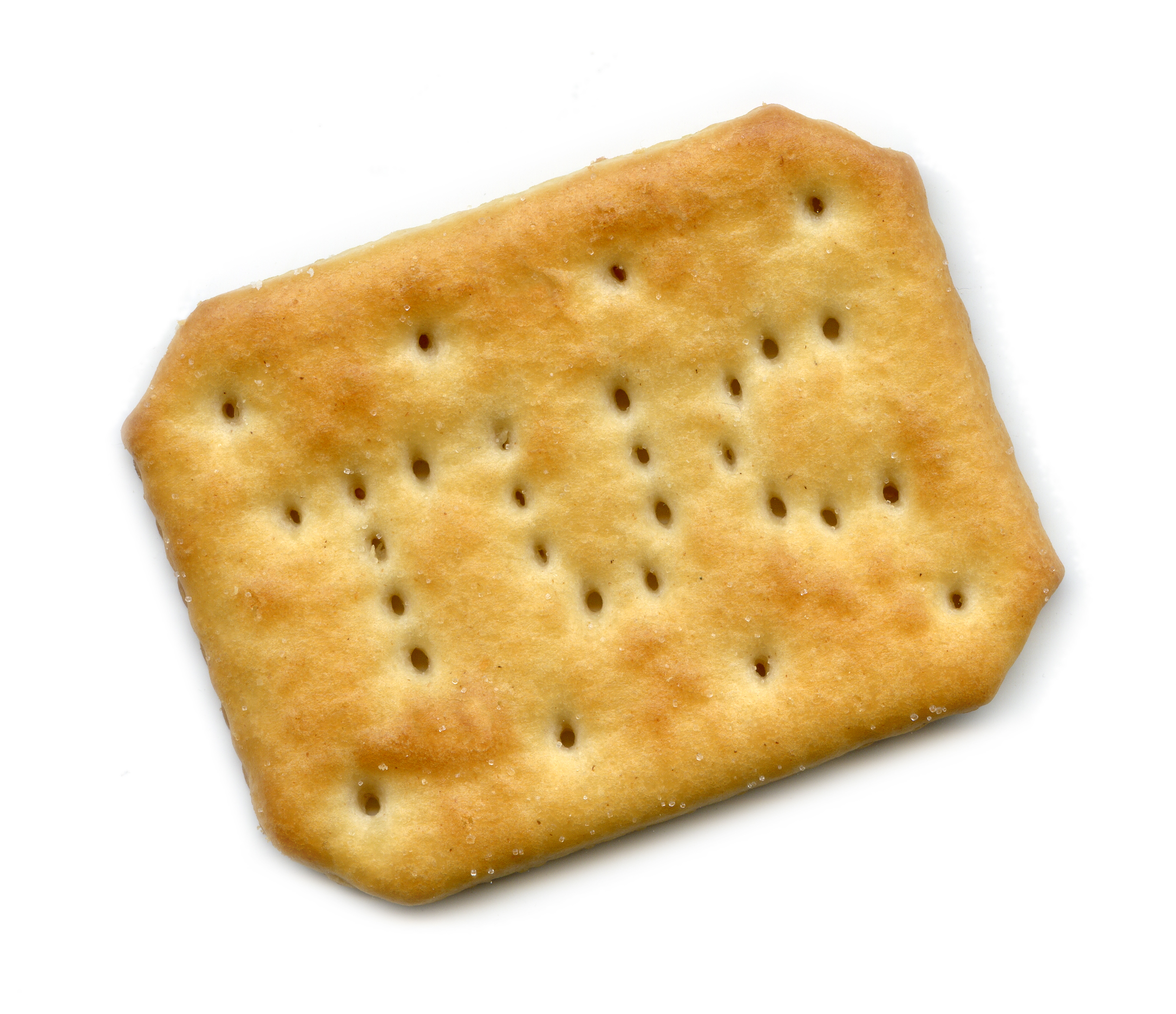
- A single TUC cracker
- Product type: Cracker
- Current owner: Mondelez International
- Country: Belgium
- Introduced: 1958; 68 years ago
- Previous owners: LU
- Website: mondelez.com/tuc

TUC (/tʊk/) is a brand of salted octagonal golden-yellow crackers. The TUC brand originated in Belgium, and belonged to French company LU. Nowadays, TUC crackers are owned by Mondelēz International, which markets the brand in mainland India, while Valeo Foods' Jacob Fruitfield Food Group produces TUC crackers for markets in Europe, Asia, North America, and North Africa, but not in Italy, where they are produced by Saiwa, a company owned by Mondelēz International. In Pakistan, TUC is manufactured and marketed by LU (Continental Biscuits) and by United Biscuits in the United Kingdom.

== History ==
A Belgian man named Mr. Parein went to the United States to learn how to make crackers. Mondelēz International claims that he saw "Trade Union Corporation" written in a newspaper, whereas some advertisements shows the name TUC as a backronym for "The Unique Cracker".

== Varieties ==
Multiple varieties of TUC biscuits are available. Some are available in "Break" form, which is a smaller package that can be packed in a lunch box, and some are available in "Mini" form, which is a smaller cracker.

- Original
- Cheese Sandwich
- Cheese (Flavored crackers, not cheese that is sandwiched between two crackers)
- Barbecue
- Sour Cream and Onion
- Bacon
- Garlic and Herbs
- Paprika
- Salt & Pepper
- Sweet Chili
- Roasted Chicken
- Samphire
- Seeds & Chives
- Pizza
- Baked Bites
- Smoky Bacon
- Smoked Sausages

== See also ==
- TUC: The Lighter Side of Life
