= Saima Noor filmography =

Saima Noor is a Pakistani actress who has appeared in Punjabi and Urdu films and Pakistani dramas. After making her film debut with Khatarnaak 1990, she appeared in a wide range of successful Punjabi films, mostly in which she was starred opposite action hero Sultan Rahi. She rose to prominence when director Syed Noor introduced her in Urdu feature films, and became one of the leading and highest-paid actresses of Pakistani cinema after starring in the mainstream Punjabi-language film Choorian, which ranks among the highest grossing Pakistani films of all time. Choorian also holds the record to be one of the longest running Pakistani films showcased at a single screen cinema where it ran for five years. In the same year, Saima agreed to work in female centric action film Daku Rani which opened to mixed reviews. In 2000, she acted in the successful horror film Billi, also directed by Noor. Saima was praised for playing double roles of a fearless girl and her mother in adventure film Jungle Queen. After many successful films, her career was disturbed after the decline of Lollywood in early 2000s. However, she shot to fame again due to her performance in blockbuster film Majajan and reprise the same character in the film's sequel Zill-e-Shah. Her film Majajan ran for five years in cinemas. During the shooting of Majajan, director Syed Noor married her but kept it a secret until Saima publicly revealed in a 2007's press conference that the couple married in 2005. In 2012, she starred in another film with Noor, titled Shareeka which generated negative reviews and turned out to be a disaster.

In 2016, her successful drama film Zill-e-Shah was re-released at the Metropole Cinema in Lahore. She also portrayed a pivotal role in biographical film Salute which flopped at the box-office. In her career spanning more than thirty years, she has constantly worked with director Masud Butt.

As of 2017, she is set to appear opposite Moammar Rana in her husband Syed Noor's much delayed film Bhai Wanted.

Saima has acted in over 300 movies. Some of her notable movies are listed below:

== Film ==
Year	Film
1987	Griban
1990	Khatarnaak
1991	Watan Kay Rakhwalay
1991	Qatil Qaidi
1992	Abdullah: The Great
1992	Mohabbat Kay Soudagar
1992	Sher Ali
1992	Khoon Ka Qarz
1993	Akri Shehzada
1993	Daku, Chor, Sipahi
1993	Yaadgaar
1993	Paidagir
1993	Chakori
1994	Pajero Group
1994	Ghunda Raj
1994	Sher Punjab Da
1994	Boot Shikan
1994	Saranga
1994	International Luteray
1994	Zameen Aasman
1995	Gabbar Singh
1995	Jungle Ka Qanoon
1996	Khilona
1996	Baazigar
1996	Ghunghat
1996	Rani Khan
1996	Karishma
1997	Mafia
1997	Umar Mukhtar
1997	Dil Walay
1998	Dupatta Jal Raha Hai
1998	Muhafiz
1998	Choorian
1998	Daku Rani
1998	Pardesi
1999	Nikki Jai Haan
1999	Chand Babu
1999	Kursi Aur Qanoon
2000	Angaaray
2000	Ghar Kab Aao Gay
2000	Pehchaan
2000	Billi
2000	Mehndi Waley Hath
2000	Beti
2000	Abhi Nahin Toh Kabhi Nahin
2000	Banarsi Chor
2000	Billo 420
2000	Khuda Ke Chor
2000	Jungle Queen
2001	Sher-e-Lahore
2001	Uff Yeh Beewian
2001	Choorian Nahin Hathkarian
2001	Moosa Khan
2001	Khanzada
2001	Toofan Mail
2001	Dakait
2001	Mukhra Chan Warga
2002	Kalu Shahpuriya
2002	Behram Daku
2002	Sholay
2002	Koyla
2002	Toofan
2002	Darinda
2002	Sher-e-Pakistan
2003	Soldier
2003	Larki Punjaban
2003	Roti Goli Aur Sarkar
2003	Yeh Wada Raha
2003	Meri Awaz Suno
2004	Billu Ghanta Gharia
2004	Hum Ek Hain
2005	Sahib Log
2005	Pappu Shahzada
2005	Naag aur Nagin
2005	Bau Badmash
2006	Qaidi Yaar
2006	One Two Ka One
2006	Majajan
2007	Jhoomar
2007	Bicchu
2007	Ek Daulat Ki Hawas
2008	Gulabo
2008	Basanti
2008	Zill-e-Shah
2009	Nach Kay Yaar Manana
2010	Channa Sachi Muchi
2010	Wohti Ley Ke Jaani Ay
2011	Jugni
2011	Aik Aur Ghazi
2011	Bhai Log
2012	Shareeka
2013	Ishq Khuda
2014	Duniya
2015	Sanam
2016	Salute
2022	Tere Bajre Di Rakhi
2023	Lahore Qalandar
