= Shaan Shahid filmography =

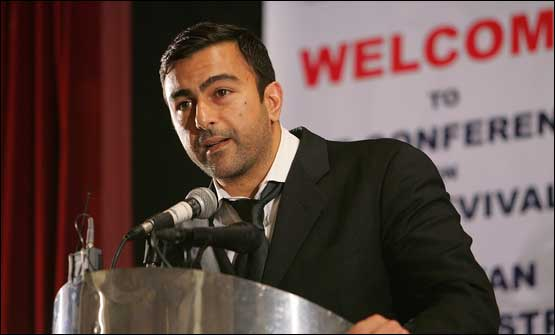
- Film: 265+ (As Actor); 5 (As Director)

Shaan Shahid is a Pakistani film actor, director and writer. He made his debut with a 1990 film Bulandi. His works include the 2007 film Khuda Ke Liye and 2013 film Waar which broke previous box office records in Pakistan. The following is a list of the films he has participated in as an actor or director.

== As an actor ==
Year	Title	Language
1990	Bulandi	Urdu
1990	Nageena	Urdu
1991	Mard	Urdu
1991	Ishq	Urdu
1991	Naag Devta	Urdu
1991	Husn Da Chor	Punjabi
1991	Nadira	Urdu
1991	Nigahen	Urdu
1991	Pyar Karan Ton Nain Darnaà	Punjabi
1991	Ishq Deewana	Urdu
1991	Gulfam	Urdu
1991	Pyar Hi Pyar	Urdu
1991	Sailab	Urdu
1991	Dil	Urdu
1992	Naila	Punjabi
1992	6'Ka	Punjabi
1992	Aashqi	Punjabi
1992	Aag	Urdu
1992	Be Naam Badshah	Urdu
1992	Chahat	Urdu
1992	Fateh	Urdu
1992	Shama	Urdu
1992	Sahiba	Urdu
1992	Boxer	Urdu
1992	Mehbooba	Punjabi
1992	Silsila Pyar Ka	Urdu
1993	Hina	Urdu
1993	Anjuman	Urdu
1993	Chakori	Punjabi
1993	Chandi	Urdu
1993	Nagin Sapera	Punjabi
1993	Neelam	Urdu
1993	Teesri Dunya	Urdu
1993	Insaniyat	Urdu
1993	Ilzam	Urdu
1993	Jadoo Nagri	Urdu
1993	Aan Milo Sajna	Punjabi
1994	Jan	Urdu
1994	Mohabbat Di Agg	Punjabi
1994	Naseeb	Urdu
1994	Aakhri Mujra	Urdu
1994	Munda Kashmiri	Urdu
1994	Nousarbaz	Urdu
1995	Aawargi	Urdu
1995	Main Nay Pyar Kiya	Urdu
1995	Naam Ki Suhagan	Urdu
1996	Ghoonghat	Urdu
1996	Khilona	Urdu
1996	Choron Kay Ghar Chor	Urdu
1997	Sangam	Urdu
1997	Fareb	Urdu
1997	Mohabbat Hay Kya Cheez	Urdu
1997	Barsat Ki Raat	Urdu
1998	Insaf Ho To Aisa	Urdu
1998	Very Good Dunya Very Bad Log	Urdu
1998	Pardesi	Punjabi
1998	Kabhi Haan Kabhi Naa	Urdu
1998	Ehsas	Urdu
1998	Tu Meri Main Tera	Urdu
1998	Waris	Urdu
1998	Jisay Day Maula	Urdu
1998	Nikah	Urdu
1998	Dunya Dekhay Gi	Urdu
1998	King Maker	Urdu
1998	Kahin Pyar Na Ho Jaye	Urdu
1998	Do Boond Pani	Urdu
1998	Hasina Numbri Aashiq 10 Numbri	Urdu
1998	Doli Saja Kay Rakhna	Urdu
1999	Da Pakhtun Leone	Pashto
1999	Shabna Bangri Bat Sheh	Pashto
1999	Guns and Roses: Ik Junoon	Urdu
1999	Koela	Urdu
1999	Desan Da Raja	Punjabi
1999	Daku Rani	Punjabi
1999	Dekha Jaye Ga	Urdu
1999	Dil Mein Chhupa Kay Rakhna	Urdu
1999	Kursi Aur Qanoon	Urdu
1999	Jannat Ki Talash	Urdu
1999	Ishq Zinda Rahay Ga	Urdu
1999	Dil To Pagal Hay	Urdu
1999	Insaf Ho To Aisa	Urdu
1999	Jazba	Urdu
1999	Chohdrani	Punjabi
1999	Babul Da Wehra	Punjabi
1999	Sala Bigra Jaye	Urdu
2000	Bali Jatti	Punjabi
2000	Jagg Mahi	Punjabi
2000	Angaray	Urdu
2000	Ghar Kab Aao Gay	Urdu
2000	Hum Khilari Pyar Kay	Urdu
2000	Long Da Lashkara	Punjabi
2000	Yaar Chann Warga	Punjabi
2000	Yaar Badshah	Punjabi
2000	Mujhe Chand Chahiye	Urdu
2000	Pehchan	Urdu
2000	Sangdil	Urdu
2000	Khuda Kay Chor	Urdu
2000	Sultana Daku	Punjabi
2000	Kahan Hay Qanoon	Urdu
2000	Mr. Faradiye	Urdu
2000	Barood	Urdu
2000	Ishtehari Gujjar	Punjabi
2000	Abhi Nahin To Kabhi Nahin	Urdu
2000	Ghulam	Punjabi
2000	Jagg Wala Mela	Punjabi
2000	Tere Pyar Mein	Urdu
2000	Aag Ka Darya	Urdu
2001	Meri Pukar	Punjabi
2001	Badmash Puttar	Punjabi
2001	Musalman	Urdu
2001	Allah Badshah	Punjabi
2001	Daket	Punjabi
2001	Hukumat	Urdu
2001	Mukhra Chann Warga	Punjabi
2001	Meray Mehboob	Urdu
2001	Gharana	Urdu
2001	Khan Zada	Punjabi
2001	Toofan Mail	Punjabi
2001	Aasoo Billa	Punjabi
2001	Daldal	Urdu
2001	Mehar Badshah	Punjabi
2001	Aaj Ki Larki	Urdu
2001	Humayun Gujjar	Punjabi
2001	Gujjar 302	Punjabi
2001	Shehanshah	Punjabi
2001	Makha Jutt	Punjabi
2001	Baghi	Urdu
2001	Badmash Gujjar	Punjabi
2001	Sher-e-Lahore	Punjabi
2001	Sangram	Urdu
2001	Ghunda Tax	Punjabi
2001	Doulat	Urdu
2001	Moosa Khan	Urdu
2002	Shikari Haseena	Urdu
2002	Babbu Khan	Punjabi
2002	Dada Badmash	Punjabi
2002	Jagga Tax	Punjabi
2002	Border	Urdu
2002	Badmash Te Qanoon	Punjabi
2002	Sholay	Punjabi
2002	Charagh Bali	Punjabi
2002	Majhu Da Vair	Punjabi
2002	Lahori Ghunda	Punjabi
2002	Behram Daku	Urdu
2002	Wehshi Jutt	Punjabi
2002	Ishtehari	Punjabi
2002	Kalu Shah Purya	Punjabi
2002	Budhha Sher	Punjabi
2002	Toofan	Urdu
2002	Raju Rocket	Punjabi
2002	Baghawat	Urdu
2002	Sher-e-Pakistan	Urdu
2002	Allah Rakha	Punjabi
2002	Jihad	Urdu
2002	Tohfa Pyar Da	Punjabi
2002	Raqqasa	Urdu
2002	Veryam	Punjabi
2002	Arain Da Kharaak	Punjabi
2002	Achhoo Sheedi	Punjabi
2002	Badmash-e-Azam	Punjabi
2002	Buddha Gujjar	Punjabi
2002	Daku	Urdu
2002	Manila Kay Jasoos	Urdu
2003	Shararat	Urdu
2003	Jutt Da Vair	Punjabi
2003	Darinda	Urdu
2003	Yeh Wada Raha	Urdu
2003	Kundan	Urdu
2003	Pappu Lahoriya	Punjabi
2003	Commando	Urdu
2003	Qayamat – A Love Triangle In Afghanistan	Urdu
2003	Soldier	Urdu
2004	Sher-e-Punjab	Punjabi
2004	Curfew Order	Punjabi
2004	Jabroo	Punjabi
2004	Jagga Baloch	Punjabi
2004	Mulla Muzaffar	Punjabi
2004	Sakhi Sultan	Punjabi
2004	Billu Ghanta Ghariya	Punjabi
2004	Wehshi Haseena	Punjabi
2004	Hum Aik Hain	Urdu
2004	Bhola Sajjan	Punjabi
2004	Dehshat	Punjabi
2004	Guddu Badshah	Punjabi
2004	Medan	Punjabi
2004	Nagri Data Di	Punjabi
2004	Amn Kay Dushman	Urdu
2005	Bhola Sunyara	Punjabi
2005	Mustafa Khan	Punjabi
2005	Wadda Chaudhary	Punjabi
2005	Pappu Shehzada	Punjabi
2005	Kuriyan Shehar Diyan	Punjabi
2005	Sher-e-Azam	Punjabi
2005	Ziddi Rajput	Punjabi
2005	Sarkaar	Urdu
2005	Khatarnaak	Punjabi
2006	Athra	Punjabi
2006	Sharif Gujjar	Punjabi
2006	Yaar Badmash	Punjabi
2006	Majajan	Punjabi
2006	Kangan	Urdu
2006	Butt Badshah	Punjabi
2006	Pappu Gujjar	Punjabi
2006	Pyo Badmashaan Da	Punjabi
2006	Zameen Kay Khuda	Urdu
2007	Puttar Humayun Gujjar Da	Punjabi
2007	Bichhu	Urdu
2007	Sooha Jora	Punjabi
2007	Manga Gujjar	Punjabi
2007	Nasha Jawani Da	Punjabi
2007	Achhoo Lahoriya	Punjabi
2007	Khuda Kay Liye	Urdu
2007	Kala Badmash	Punjabi
2007	Ghundi Run	Punjabi
2007	Ishtehari Rajput	Punjabi
2007	Billo 302	Punjabi
2007	Ghunda No. 1	Punjabi
2007	Potra Shahiye Da	Punjabi
2008	Anjam	Urdu
2008	Gulabo	Punjabi
2008	Khaufnaak	Punjabi
2008	Basanti	Punjabi
2008	Suhagan	Punjabi
2008	Zill-e-Shah	Punjabi
2008	Ghunda Punjab Da	Punjabi
2008	Wehshi Ghunda	Punjabi
2009	Allah Uttay Doriyan	Punjabi
2009	Hakim Arain	Punjabi
2009	Nach Kay Yaar Manana	Punjabi
2009	Sarkaari Raj	Punjabi
2009	Fareb	Urdu
2009	Wehshi Badmash	Pashto
2009	Gujjar Badshah	Punjabi
2009	Madam X	Punjabi
2010	Sta Da Yaarai Na Qurban	Pashto
2010	Lado Rani	Punjabi
2010	Wohti Ley Kay Jani Aey	Punjabi
2010	Ilyasa Gujjar	Punjabi
2010	Number Daarni	Punjabi
2011	Khamosh Raho	Urdu
2011	Jugni	Punjabi
2012	Acha Gujjar	Punjabi
2012	Malang Badshah	Punjabi
2012	Dil Diyan Lagiyan	Punjabi
2012	Gujjar Da Kharaak	Punjabi
2012	Shareeka	Punjabi
2012	Sher Dil	Punjabi
2013	Bhola Ishtehari	Punjabi
2013	Ishq Khuda	Punjabi
2013	Waar	English
2013	Sharabi	Urdu
2014	Naseebo	Urdu
2014	Ishq Di Gali	Urdu
2014	Eho Kuri Leni Aye	Urdu
2014	O21	English
2014	Dil Jalay	Urdu
2015	Lahoriya Te Pishoriya	Punjabi
2016	Chann Chaudhary	Punjabi
2016	Laal Badshah	Punjabi
2016	Gunah Ka Anjam	Urdu
2017	Yalghaar	Urdu
2017	Kaliya	Punjabi
2017	Sona Badmash	Punjabi
2017	Arth - The Destination	Urdu
2020	Ye Bheege Hont	Urdu
2022	Zarrar	Urdu/English
2026	Bullah	Punjabi
2026	Psycho	Urdu
TBA	Waar 2	Urdu

== As a director ==
Year	Film	Language	Starring
1999	Guns and Roses: Ik Junoon	Urdu	Shaan Shahid, Faisal Rehman, Meera, Resham
2000	Mujhe Chand Chahiye	Urdu	Shaan Shahid, Noor Bukhari, Moammar Rana, Reema Khan, Atiqa Odho and Javed Sheikh
2001	Moosa Khan	Urdu	Shaan Shahid, Saima Noor, Abid Ali, Jan Rambo, Noor
2008	Zill-e-Shah	Punjabi	Shaan Shahid, Mustafa Qureshi, Deeba, Noor Bukhari, Saima Noor
2017	Arth - The Destination	Urdu	Shaan Shahid, Mohib Mirza, Humaima Malik, Uzma Hassan
