= List of Pakistani films of 2003 =

List of Pakistani films by year 2003

A list films produced in Pakistan in 2003 (see 2003 in film) and in the Urdu language:

== 2003 ==
Title	Director	Cast	Genre	Notes
2003
Commando		Saima, Shaan, Moammar Rana		
Darinda		Sana, Shaan, Reema		
Darr		Saima, Shaan, Noor		
Dil Totey Totey Hogaya		Saima, Shaan, Reema		
Kalia		Sana, Shaan, Nirma		
Halaku		Sana, Shaan, Babur		
Kundan		Saima, Shaan, Babar		
Laaj	A Rauf Khalid	Zara Sheikh, Nirma, Imran Khan, Resham, Talat Hussain	Drama	The film was released on November 26, 2003
Larki Panjaban	Syed Noor	Babar Ali, Shamil Khan, Saima	Drama	The film was released on Christmas 2003
Meri Awaz Sunu		Saima, Shaan, Meera		
Pyar Hi Pyar Mein	Fahim Burney	Anchal, Ali Tabish, Wasif Butt, Nisha	Romance; Drama	The film was released on April 4, 2003.
Qayamat		Saiam, Shaan, Sangeeta		
Roti, Goli Aur Sarkar		Reema, Mohammar Rana		
Shararat	Samina Peerzada	Babar Ali, Mehr Hassan, Nirma, Shaan	Romance; Musical	The film was released on January 10, 2003
Soldier		Aleena, Balal, Rashid		
Tera Jadu Chal Gaya		Noor, Moamar Rana		
Yeh Waada Raha		Saima, Shaan, Moamar		

== See also ==
- 2003 in Pakistan
