= List of Pakistani films of 2009 =

List of Pakistani films by year 2009

This is a list of films released in Pakistan in 2009 (see 2009 in film).

== 2009 ==
Film	Language	Release date	Director	Cast	Notes
Talabgaar	Urdu	27 February	Suhail Ali Tony	Shamyl khan, Sana, Amina Malik	First released film in 2009
Wehshi Ghunda	Punjabi	6 March	Pervez Rana	Shaan, Saima	
Short Cut	Urdu	6 March	Mazhar and Fakhar Imam		
Khoufnak	Punjabi	7 March	Saeed Ali Khan	Shaan, Sana	
Ishq Shehnshah	Punjabi	7 March	Saeed Rana	Saima, Moammar Rana, Asha	
Chann Badshah	Punjabi		Rasheed Malik	Saima, Moammar Rana	
Badmash Gujjar	Punjabi		Masood Butt	Saima, Moammar Rana	
Allah Utay Dorian	Punjabi		Masood Butt	Saima, Shaan, Mustafa Qureshi	
Miss Top 10	Urdu	10 April	Rasheed Dogar	Sana, Shaan	
Hakim Arain	Punjabi	1 May	Sangeeta	Noor, Shaan, Babar Ali	
Mojan Hi Mojan	Punjabi	15 May	Sangeeta	Reema, Moammar Rana	
Honeymoon	Urdu	15 May		Nida Chaudhary, Aisha	
Basanti	Punjabi	5 June	Hassan Askari	Shaan, Mustafa Qureshi	
Ibba Gujjar	Punjabi	12 June		Shaan, Moammar Rana	
Haseena Goli Maar	Urdu				
Aaj Ki Larki	Urdu	19 June		Nargis, Shaan, Babar Ali, Saud	
Arain Da Kharak	Punjabi		Sangeeta	Saima, Shaan, Moammar Rana, Saud	
Ghunda No. 1	Punjabi		Masood Butt	Shaan, Saud	
Zakhmi Aurat	Urdu	26 June		Shaan, Sana	
Mehbooba	Urdu	10 July	Rasheed Dogar	Noor	
Chan Badshah	Punjabi	10 July	Rasheed Malik	Saima, Moammar Rana, Babar Ali	
Pappu Shehzada	Punjabi	10 July	Maqsood Ahmed	Saima, Shaan	
Yaar Dushman	Punjabi	10 July	Maqsood Ahmed	Saima, Moammar Rana, Babar Ali	
Ishq Beparwah	Punjabi	24 July	Altaf Hussain	Sana, Moammar Rana, Veena Malik	Hit film
Loufar	Urdu	24 July		Laila	
Anokhi Shikaran	Urdu	24 July	Saeed Ali Khan	Sana, Laila	
Ishq	Urdu	7 August	Altaf Hussain		
Black Cat	Urdu	7 August	Saeed Ali Khan	Ahmed Butt	
Red Light Hotel	Urdu				
Company	Urdu		Pervez Rana		
Nach Kay Yaar Manana	Punjabi	21 September	Masood Butt	Saima, Sana, Shaan	Highest-grossing film in 2009
Sarkari Raj	Punjabi	13 November		Saima, Shaan, Shahid	
Wehshi Badmash	Punjabi		Sangeeta	Sana, Shaan, Laila	
Gujjar Badshah	Punjabi		Masood Butt	Saima, Shaan, Babar Ali	
Madam X	Urdu		Rasheed Dogar	Shaan	
Husn Parast	Urdu	28 November	Rasheed Dogar	Moammar Rana	

== See also ==
- 2009 in Pakistan
