= List of Pakistani films of 2007 =

List of Pakistani films by year 2007

This is a list of films produced in Pakistan in 2007 (see 2007 in film) and in the Urdu language.

== Top Grossing Films of 2007 ==
The US dollar rate is adjusted according to the dollar rate in 2007.

The top 4 films released in 2007 by worldwide gross are as follows:

Highest-grossing films of 2007
| Rank | Title | Studio | Gross | Ref. |
|---|---|---|---|---|
| 1. | Khuda Kay Liye | Shoman Productions | Rs. 15.06 crore (US$540,000) | |
| 2. | Mein Ek Din Laut Kay Aaoon Ga | SuperMusicMasti UK & Geo Films | Rs. 2.00 crore (US$72,000) | |
| 3. | Jhoomar | Paragon Entertainment | Rs. 1.80 crore (US$64,000) | |
| 4. | Mohabbataan Sachiyaan | Sound View Production | Rs. 1.50 crore (US$54,000) | |

== Urdu language ==
| Title | Director | Cast | Genre | Notes |
|---|---|---|---|---|
| Anokhi Shikaran | | Sana, Moamar Rana, Laila | | |
| Aurat Ek Khilona | | Reema, Moamar Rana, Babar Ali | | |
| Badnaam | | Saima, Moamar Rana | | |
| Bichhu | | Saima, Moamar Rana | | |
| Ek Daulat Ki Hawas | | Saima, Moammar Rana, Sana | | |
| Godfather | Hriday Shetty | Vinod Khanna, Arbaaz Khan, Meera, Ajab Gul and Shafqat Cheema | Action | The film was released on October 14, 2007. |
| Haseena Golimar | | Saima, Moamar Rana | | |
| Honey Moon | Saeed Ali Khan | Nida Chodhary, Ahmad Butt, Sajna | | |
| Jhoomar | Syed Noor | Saima; Moammar Rana | Romance; Drama | The film was released on October 14, 2007 |
| Khuda Ke Liye | Shoaib Mansoor | Shaan, Naseeruddin Shah, Fawad Afzal Khan, Iman Ali, Hameed Sheikh | Drama | Renowned TV artist Shoaib Mansoor directed his first film, The film was released on July 20, 2007 |
| Mein Ek Din Laut Ke Aaoonga | Mohammad Javed Fazil | Humayun Saeed, Nadeem, Nausheen Sardar Ali, Puja Kanwal and Javed Sheikh | Drama | The film was released on August 24, 2007 |
| Zibahkhana | Omar Ali Khan | Ashfaq Bhatti, Sultan Billa, Osman Khalid Butt, Rubya Chaudhry | Horror | Pakistan's first ever gore film. The film was released on March 30, 2007 in Denmark and December 21, 2007 in Pakistan. |
| Mohabbataan Sachiyaan | Shahzad Rafique | Veena Malik, Babrak Shah, Adnan Khan, Maria Khan | Romance film | t is a love story highlighting the frustration and anguish of the young generation affected by the forced decisions of their elders. The film is about a love triangle between Veena Malik, Babrik Shah and the new Adnan. Depicting the generation gap, the story handles the cultural and psycho-social problems of the youth that ultimately affects the society as a whole. |

== Pashto language ==
| Title | Director | Cast | Genre | Notes |
|---|---|---|---|---|
| 420 | Imran Khan | Shahid, Sidra noor Jehangir, meena naz, shiza, imran | | The film was released October 13, 2007. |
| Badshahi Da Malanga Nu Peh Duashi | Arshad Khan | Shahid, Nazo, Sonia Lal, Hina Khan, Shabina khan Jehangir, Imran, Naemat, saba gul, Ali khan, kaleem | | The film was released October 13, 2007. |
| Haqueqat | Nasim Khan Writer:Saleem Murad | | | The film was released An upcoming, 2007. |
| Son of a Lion | Benjamin Gilmour | Sher Alam Miskeen Ustad, Niaz Khan Shinwari, Baktiyar Ahmed Afridi | | |
| Tiger | Liaquat Ali Khan | Arbaz, Jehangir, Sidra noor, shabina khan, sehar, Asif khan, Javed moosa zai | | The film was released October 13, 2007. |
| Zara Mein Ta Oray De | Arbaz Khan | Arbaz, Jehangir, Shahzaman, Maria, Sidra noor, Meena naz, Liaqat major, Pervez | | The film was released October 13, 2007. |
| Pakistan Zama Janaan | Nasim Khan | Arbaaz Khan, Asif Khan, Nazo, Liaquat Major | Action/Drama | |
| Ishq | Arbaaz Khan | Arbaaz Khan, Dilber Munir, Sidra Noor, Jahangir Khan Jani, Asif Khan | Action | |

== See also ==
- 2007 in Pakistan
