= List of Pakistani films of 1997 =

List of Pakistani films by year 1997

A list films produced in Pakistan in 1997 (see 1997 in film) and in the Urdu language:

== 1997 ==
Title	Director	Cast	Genre	Notes	
1997
Aanchal		Resham, Rambo, Arbaz			
Aashqi Khel Nahin		Meera, Saud, Nirma			
Aulad Ki Qasam	Javed Fazil	Nadeem, Reema Khan, Shabnam	Drama		
Barsat Ki Raat		Meera, Shaan, Rambo		The film was released on November 14, 1997	
Chand Girhan		Shah Taj, Faisal Qureshi			
Deewane Tere Pyar Ke	Syed Noor	Jia Ali; Moammar Rana	Romance; Drama	Jia Ali's debut film, The Film was released on November 7, 1997.	
Dever Deewanay		Reema, Babur Ali, Rambo			
Dil Bhi Tera Ham Bhi Tere		Meera, Saud, Mohsin			
Dil Kisi Ka Dost Nahin	Hassan Askari	Saima, Saud, Khoshboo, Arbaz Khan, Sana	Music; Drama	The film was released on June 20, 1997.	
Dil Tera Aashiq		Neeli, Mohsin, Khushboo			
Dil Walay		Saima, Javed Sheikh, Gullu			
Dream Girl	Sangeeta	Meera, Saud, Laila			
Duniya Hai Dil Walon Ki		Reema, Babur Ali, Saud			
Fareb	Masood Butt	Meera, Saud, Laila, Shaan			The film was released on October 10, 1997
Ghayal		Babra, Izhar Qazi, Gullu			
Ham Kisi Se Kam Nahin		Reema, Babur Ali, Rambo			
Ham Tumhare Hain	Aslam Daar	Reema, Babur Ali, Nadeem, Meera, Saud	Music	The film was released on May 30, 1997	
Jan Jan Pakistan		Saiba, Rambo, Sara			
Jeet		Meera, Saud, Rambo			
Karam Daata		Neeli, Nadeem, Rambo			
Karishma		Reema, Saud, Rambo			
Khuda Janay		Reema, Babur Ali, Rambo			
Mafia		Reema, Babur Ali, Rambo			
Main Khilari Too Anari		Reema, Babur Ali, Rambo			
Mard Jeene Nahin Dete		Neeli, Rambo, Meera			
Miss Kalashnikov		Shahida Mini, Gullu, Saima			
Mohabbat Hai Kya Cheez		Resham, Shaan, Nadeem		The film was released on October 24, 1997	
Najaiz		Reema, Babur Ali, Nadeem			
Qarz	Usmaan Peerzada	Ghulam Mohiuddin, Nirma, Javed Sheikh	Drama		
Raja Pakistani		Reema, Babur Ali, Rambo			
Sangam	Syed Noor	Resham, Shaan, Salim Sheikh, Sana	Music; Drama	The film was released on July 4, 1997	
Sharafat		Saima, Saud, Resham			
Umar Mukhtar	Hasnain	Reema, Yusuf Khan Nadeem, Arbaz Khan, Ghulam Mohayuddin, Sohail Ahmad	Drama	The film was released on June 21, 1997.	
Uqaboon Ka Nasheman	Sayed Noor	Yusuf Khan Reema, Babur Ali, Rambo			
Yes Boss		Meera, Javed Sheikh, Resham			

== See also ==
- 1997 in Pakistan
