= List of Pakistani films of 2010 =

List of Pakistani films by year 2010

This is a list of films released in Pakistan in 2010.

2010 was a very weak year in the history of Pakistan film industry as twelve films were released, out of which only one, the Punjabi movie Wohti Le Key Jani Aay by veteran director Syed Noor, was declared successful, with a business of almost Rs 8 million in just two days.

== Releases ==
=== May - June ===
Opening		Title	Genre	Director	Cast	Ref.
M A Y	7	Virsa	Romantic Drama	Pankaj Batra	Gulshan Grover, Mehreen Raheel, Arya Babbar, Kanwaljeet Singh, Noman Ejaz.	
J U N	25	Channa Sachi Muchi	Romance	Ijaz Bajwa	Moammar Rana, Saima, Babar Ali, Hina Shaheen, Mehr Hassan, Shafqat Cheema, Irfan Khoosat and Iftikhar Thakur	
J U N	25	Haseena 20/20	Romance	Faheem Bhatti	Nida Chodhary, Ahmed Butt, Zeeshan Sikander, Asha Alvi, Salman Hashmi, Mah Zeb	

=== September - November ===
Opening		Title	Genre	Director	Cast	Ref.
S E P	11	Haseeno ka Mela	Comedy, Romance	Sangeeta	Sana Nawaz, Moammar Rana, Meera (actress), Asha, Nadia, Arzoo, Jan Rambo, Mohsin, Babu Baral, Tariq Shah	
S E P	11	Wohti Leke Jaani Ay	Comedy, Romance	Syed Noor	Saima Noor, Shaan Shahid, Iftikhar Thakur, Haya Ali, Mustafa Qureshi, Amanat Chan	
S E P	11	Taxi 707	Romance	Waseem Hassan	Ahmed Butt, Nida Chaudhury, Amna, Mah Zeb, Hanan, Ali Raza, Salman	
S E P	11	Lado Rani	Romance, Action	Masood Butt	Nargis (Pakistani actress), Silla Hussain, Shaan Shahid, Moammar Rana, Rahila, Maria, Abrar, Aliya, Mustafa Qureshi	
O C T	22	Phool Aur Kantay	Action, War	Ashfaq Chaudhary	Sana Nawaz, Ashfaq, Jawad, Nadia, Rahila, Naghma, Mohsin Ali, Tariq Shah	

Opening		Title	Genre	Director	Cast	Ref.
N O V	17	Numberdarni	Action	Masood Butt	Nargis (Pakistani actress), Shaan Shahid, Meera (actress), Saud (actor), Rashid, Rahila, Saba, Hina Shaheen, Tariq Shah, Shafqat Cheema	
N O V	17	Ilyasa Gujjar	Action	Pervaiz Rana	Nargis (Pakistani actress), Shaan Shahid, Silah Hussain, Haidar Ali, Rahila, Naghma, Khawar	

== See also ==
- 2010 in film
- 2010 in Pakistan
