= List of Pakistani films of 2000 =

List of Pakistani films by year 2000

This is a list of films produced in Pakistan in 2000 (see 2000 in film) and in the Urdu language.

== 2000 ==
Title	Director	Cast	Genre	Notes
2000
Aag Ka Darya		Noor Bukhari, Shaan, Sana Nawaz	Action	
Abhi Nahin To Kabhi Nahin		Saima, Shaan, Moammar Rana	Action Comedy	
Angaaray	Syed Noor	Shafqat Cheema, Mustafa Qureshi, Moammar Rana, Saima, Shaan	Action; Drama	
Banarsi Chor		Saima, Saud, Reema Khan		
Barood		Reema Khan, Shaan, Moamar		
Beti		Saima, Moamar, Rambo		
Billi	Syed Noor	Saima, Nadeem, Meera, Noor	Horror	
Billo 420		Reema Khan, Moamar, Saima		
Dil Se Na Bhoolana		Meera, Saud, Rambo		
Ghar Kab Aao Gay	Iqbal Kashmiri	Saima, Shaan, Sana, Meera, Zeeshan, Javed Sheikh, Jia Ali	Action; Drama	The film was released on January 9, 2000
Ghulam		Saima, Shaan, Moamar		
Ham Khiladi Pyar Ke		Neeli, Shaan, Sana		
Jungle Queen	Syed Noor	Jan Rambo, Moammar Rana, Saima	Action; Drama	
Kahan Hai Qanoon		Saima, Shaan, Resham		
Khuda Ke Chor		Saima, Shaan, Nadeem		
Lakhon Mein Aik		Saima, Moamar, Babar Ali		
Lazawal		Meera, Suad, Babur		
Love in Holland		Laila, Ahsan, Ateeq		
Marvi		Marvi, Faisal Qureshi		
Mehbooba		Noor, Arbaz, Roop		
Meri Tauba		Neeli, Javed Sheikh		
Mr. Faradiye		Meera, Shaan, Saud		
Mujhe Chand Chahiye	Shaan	Shaan, Noor, Atiqa Odho, Moammar Rana, Reema Khan, Javed Sheikh, Ismail Tara	Comedy; Drama	The film was released on March 17, 2000
No Paisa No Problem		Noor, Humayun Saeed, Sana		
Pasand		Reema Khan, Babur, Khushboo		
Pehchan	Masud Butt	Moammar Rana, Reema Khan, Saima, Saud, Shaan	Drama	
Sangdil		Saima, Shaan, Moamar		
Sultana Daku		Saima, Shaan, Sana		
Tere Pyar Mein	Hassan Askari	Shaan, Zara Sheikh, Veena Malik	Romance; Drama	Zara Sheikh's debut film, film was released on December 28, 2000; Won Lux Style Award for Best Film
Waada		Saima, Saud, Noor		
Yeh Hui Na Mardon Wali Baat	Farjad Nabi	Resham, Munna, Raheel, Guriya	Short	

== See also ==
- 2000 in Pakistan
