= List of Pakistani films of 1999 =

List of Pakistani films by year 1999

A list films produced in Pakistan in 1999 (see 1999 in film) and in the Urdu language:

== 1999 ==
Title	Director	Cast	Genre	Notes
1999
Aik Aur Love Story	Sajjad Ali	Sajjad Ali, Saira Khan, Nirma, Salim Sheikh	Musical; Romance	The film was released on July 9, 1999
Chand Babu		Saima, Umar Sharif		
Chupke Chupke		Resham, Moamar Rana		
Daku Rani		Saima, Shaan, Moamar		
Dekha Jayega		Saima, Shaan, Moamar		The film was released on April 16, 1999
Dil Mein Chhupa Ke Rakhna		Saima, Shaan, Nadeem		
Dil To Pagal Hai		Reema, Shaan, Bahar		
Dunia Se Kya Darna		Saima, Javed Sheikh		
Dushman Zinda Rahe		Reema, Moamar, Babur		
Ghaddar		Khushboo, Faisal Rehman		
Guns and Roses: Ik Junoon	Shaan Shahid	Resham, Meera, Shaan Shahid, Faisal Rehman	Romance; Drama	The film was released on January 8, 1999
Hawwa Ki Beti		Sapna, Izhar Qazi, Nargis		
Ik Pagal Si Larki		Reema, Moamar, Khushboo		
Insaniyat Ke Qatil		Meera, Saud, Babar		
Inteha	Samina Peerzada	Meera, Nadeem, Resham, Humayun Saeed, Zeeshan Sikander	Music, Romance, Drama	Samina Peerzada's first film as Director, film was released on February 26, 1999.
Ishq Zinda Rahe Ga		Neeli, Shaan, Sahiba		
Jannat Ki Talash	Hassan Askari	Resham, Saud, Shaan Shahid, Shafqat Cheema	Drama	Nigar Award winner for Best Film of the Year-1999
Jazba		Saima, Shaan, Saud		
Koela		Saima, Shaan, Moamar		The film was released on January 15, 1999
Kursi Aur Qanoon		Saima, Shaan, Moamar		The film was released on July 16, 1999
Mujhe Jeene Do	Javed Sheikh	Meera, Babur Ali, Javed Shiekh, Sana	Music; Drama	The film was released on September 3, 1999
Noukar		Reema, Saud, Saima		
Pal Do Pal		Meera, Saud, Moamar	Action, Drama	The film was released on November 5, 1999
Qaid		Zeba Bakhtiar, Saud, Saima		
Qismat		Saima, Moamar, Reema		
Sala Bigra Jaye		Saima, Shaan, Mohsin		
Waris		Saima, Shaan, Moamar		
Wirasat		Saima, Moamar, Rambo		The film was released on September 10, 1999

== See also ==
- 1999 in Pakistan
