= List of Pakistani films of 2001 =

List of Pakistani films by year 2001

This is a list of films produced in Pakistan in 2001 (see 2001 in film) and in the Urdu language.

== 2001 ==
Title	Director	Cast	Genre	Notes
Aaj Ki Larki		Resham, Shaan, Babur Ali		
Asoo Billa		Shaan, Sana, Babar Ali, Naghma, Nargis	action	
Babu		Zeba Bakhtiar, Saud		
Baghi		Saima, Shaan, Saud		
Choorian Nahin Hathkarian		Saima, Saud, Reema		
Dakait		Saima, Shaan, Moamar		
Daldal		Reema, Shaan, Saud		
Dil Deewana Hai		Jia Ali, Babur, Moamar, Nadeem		
Doulat		Saima, Shaan, Nirma		
Gharana		Meera, Babur, Saud		
Hakumat		Saima, Shaan, Sana		
Jan Tere Naam		Reemit, Babur Ali, Saud		
Janwar		Noor, Arbaz, Megha		
Khanzada	Akram Khan	Saima, Shaan		
Khoey Ho Tum Kahan	Ajab Gul	Meera, Babar Ali, Nagma, Deeba	Drama, Thriller	The film was released on April 27, 2001
Martey Dam Tak		Sonam, Umar, Amir		
Mere Mehboob		Resham, Shaan, Sana		
Meri Pukar		Shaan, Saud		
Moosa Khan	Shaan	Saima, Shaan, Noor, Jan Rambo	Drama	Shaan's first film as a director, The film was released on December 17, 2001
Munda Rang Rangeela		Resham, Mohamar, Rambo		
Musalman		Sana, Shaan, Meera		
Raka		Saima, Lucky, Hamayun		
Rukhsati		Meera, Moamar Rana, Jia Ali		
Sajan Ka Pyar		Khushbu, Imran Sheikh		
Sangam		Reema, Shaan, Saud		
Sapne Apne Apne		Saima, Moamar, Bahar		
Toofan Mail		Saima, Shaan, Noor		
Uff Yeh Bivian		Saima, Moamar, Reema		

== See also ==
- 2001 in Pakistan
