= Qayamat – A Love Triangle In Afghanistan =

Qayamat
- Directed by: Sangeeta
- Written by: Jafar Arsh
- Produced by: Sheikh Mohammad Akram
- Starring: Moammar Rana; Saima; Shaan; Nirma; Rasheed Naz; Deeba; Shafqat Cheema; Khushbu; Irfan Khoosat
- Cinematography: Waqar Bokhari
- Edited by: Qaiser Zameer
- Music by: M. Arshad
- Release date: 2003
- Country: Pakistan
- Language: Urdu

Qayamat is a 2003 Pakistani Urdu film directed by Sangeeta and stars Saima and Shaan.

== Plot ==
The story is set in 1979 when Afghanistan is invaded from the north by the former Soviet Union and a large number of Afghan refugees begin crossing over into Pakistan. One such caravan brings Saima to a land of political unrest. Deeba is Shaan's mother, and Saima is his fiancée. Amidst the ravages of war, Deeba and Saima lose Shaan and come to Pakistan. They camp in a small town on the Pak-Afghan border, the tribal chief of which used to frequent their hometown. The tribal chief's son, Moammar Rana, then falls in love with Saima. Meanwhile, the war is halted and Shaan comes to the shantytown looking for his mother and his fiancé. The Afghan war serves as a parallel to the ferocity witnessed between Moammar Rana and Shaan after that.

== Cast ==
- Moammar Rana
- Saima
- Shaan
- Nirma
- Rasheed Naz
- Deeba
- Shafqat Cheema
- Khushbu
- Irfan Khoosat
