= Khushboo (Pakistani actress) =

Pakistani actress

- Born: Sobia Hussain; 24 June 1980 (age 46); Talagang, Pakistan
- Occupations: Actress, dancer
- Years active: 1988-current
- Spouse: Arbaaz Khan
- Children: Two sons
- Modeling information
- Height: 1.65 m (5 ft 5 in)
- Hair color: Black
- Eye color: Brown

Khushboo (born 24 June 1980) is a Pakistani film and stage actress and dancer. Her first film was Maa Bani Dulhan, in 1988.

== Life and career ==
Khushboo started her career in 1988 as a supporting actress, which she remained in most movies. Her only lead role was in Dil kisi ka dost nahi (1997). After garnering insufficient fame, she turned to stage shows in 2000 and married Pakistani actor Arbaaz Khan, with whom she has two sons.

In 2025, she confirmed that she and Arbaaz had separated, after years of media speculation about their marriage.

== Filmography ==
Year	Film Title	Cast
1988	Maa bani Dulhan	Babra Sharif, Ismael Shah, Khushboo
1990	Nageena	Madiha Shah, Shaan, Khushboo, Naghma, Neelo.
1990	Zehreelay	Reema Khan, Javed Sheikh, Ajab Gul, Shafqat Cheema, Khushboo
1991	Selaab	Shaan, Khushboo, Asad Malik, Reema Khan
1991	Mard	Shaan, Khushboo, Madiha Shah, Abid Ali
1992	Fateh	Kavita, Shaan, Nabeel, Khushboo, Abid Ali.
1992	Ishq Rehna Sada	Asad Malik, Khushboo, Sahiba
1993	Chandi	Reema Khan, Shaan, Bahar Begum, Khushboo, Firdous Jamal.
1994	Ghunda Raj	Sultan Rahi, Saima Noor, Jan Rambo,
1994	Phool	Umer Shareef, Nadeem, Khushboo, Madiha Shah
1995	Khazana	Nadeem, Haider Sultan, Khushboo, Sahiba, Sapna
1997	Dil Kisi Ka Dost Nahin	Saud, Khushboo, Saima Noor, Arbaaz khan
1997	Dil Tera Aashiq	Mohsin Khan, Khushboo, Neeli
1998	Raqasa	Shaan, Khushboo, Momar Rana, Meera
1999	Dushman Zinda Rahe	Reema Khan, Moamar Rana, Babar Ali, Nargis, Khushboo, Humayun, Asif
1999	Dekha Jaye Ga	Saima Noor, Shaan Shahid, Moamar Rana, Resham, Rembo, Shafqat Cheema, Khushboo.
1999	Ik Pagal Si Larki	Khushboo, Moamar Rana, Reema Khan
1999	Ghaddar	Khushboo, Fasial Rehman, Faysal Qureshi
1999	Jannat Ki Talash	Shaan, Khushboo, Sana, Saud, Resham
1999	Nauker	Reema Khan, Saud, Saima Noor, Rembo, Khushboo, Arbaaz Khan, Bahar Begum.
2000	Barood	Reema Khan, Shaan Shahid, Moamar Rana, Resham, Khushbu, Sardar Kamal
2000	Pasand	Babar Ali, Khushboo, Reema Khan
2000	Lazawal	Meera, Saud, Babar Ali, Sana Nawaz, Arbaaz Khan, Khushboo, Ghulam Mohiuddin
2001	Khanzada	Saima, Shaan, Babar Ali, Khushbu, Nirma, Shafqat
2001	Raka	Saima Noor, Lucky, Khushboo, Ghulam Mohiuddin, Nargis, Masood Akhtar, Babbu Baral, Nayyar Ejaz
2001	Jungle Queen	Momer Rana, Khushboo, Saima Noor
2002	Budha Sher	Yousuf Khan, Saima Noor, Shaan, Resham, Babar Ali, Khushbu
2012	Dil Diyan Lagiyan	Arbaaz Khan, Khushboo, Saud, Sana Nawaz, Rambo, Noor
2013	Shikra	Shaan, Khushboo
2013	No Tension	Iftikhar Thakur, Khushboo, Sardar Kamal
2014	Khaar Dimag Gujjar	Shaan, Khushboo
2022	Tere Bajre Di Rakhi	Saima Noor, Babar Ali Jannat Mirza

== List of stage performances ==
- Jiddon Luk Nu
- Doom
- Wey Gujjara Wey
- Tera Ishq NachaYea
- Puck Gyan Umbian
- Eik Wari Te Senay
- Juppi Kutkay
- Payar Di Gunderi
- Tich Butona The Jori
- Meri Pholan Wali Kurti
- Kuchi Kali Hoon
- KayRee KayRee Shea Teri
- Tauba Tauba Kara Diti
- Bilo Ni Tera Laal Ghagra
- Juppi Kutkay
- Punjabi Munde Lain Chuske
- Seeti Bajay Ge
- Jor braber ka
