= Ghundi Run =

Pakistani film

- Directed by: Pervez Rana
- Starring: Shaan; Nargis; Shafqat Cheema
- Music by: Ustad Tafu film song lyrics: Altaf Bajwa
- Release date: 14 October 2007
- Country: Pakistan
- Language: Punjabi

Ghundi Run is a 2007 Pakistani Punjabi language film, directed by Pervez Rana. It was released across theaters in Pakistan on October 14, 2007. Music is by Ustad Tafu, film song lyrics by Altaf Bajwa and the playback singer is Naseebo Lal.

It was an average film and was not highly successful at the box-office.
