= Sher-e-Lahore =

2001 film by Sangeeta

- Directed by: Sangeeta
- Written by: Jafar Arsh
- Produced by: Muhammad Afzal Butt
- Starring: Saima; Shaan; Moammar Rana; Nirma
- Music by: Wajahat Attre
- Release date: 19 October 2001
- Country: Pakistan
- Language: Punjabi

Sher-e-Lahore is a 2001 Punjabi-language movie of Pakistan, directed by Sangeeta, starring Saima and Shaan.

== Plot ==
'Bonny' is harassed by some 'Badmash' (goon) on her way back home while a wise old man reminisces about the British Raj days remarking that nobody dared to look disrespectfully at anybody else's daughter or sister and that Independence from British rule in 1947 has brought very little that is positive and tangible. Meanwhile, the college girl has had enough of the daily harassment at the hands of the men in the street and announces to her bemused parents about her intention of quitting her education altogether.

Both parents are angry and wish that she would continue her studies and the father, a righteous honest soul decides that from the next day onwards, he will accompany his daughter on her way to and back from her college. The next day, on the way to college, the father and daughter are inevitably menaced by the goons and a battle to death ensues with both father and daughter being slaughtered by the evil goons in the broad daylight with no apparent fear of police intervention. Moments later, the matriarch played by Madame Sangeeta in her highly anticipated return to the screen arrives on the scene and wails away in typical style promising the worst vengeance upon the murderers of her daughter and her husband. Crying for vengeance in the manner that Maula Jat's mother Dani once did, she lets out a mighty call for her son, Ali Sher, who like the great Maula Jat has extraordinary sensory capabilities. Seconds later, he arrives at the scene and dishes out some true Maula Jat style justice, slaying the beasts in an instant before letting out a cry of victory!

A proud mother gloats at her son's brilliant and swift bloody justice as he is led off to the notorious Macch Jail bellowing loudly that her son is to be known hence not as Ali Sher but as 'The Sher-e-Lahore' to which her son growls his approval while swaggering off. The news of the goons' deaths reaches notorious underworld kingpin Bandial (Tariq Shah) who promises to unleash his own terrible vengeance for the murder of his sons and so a deadly and obligatory blood feud between the Sher-e-Lahore and Bandial starts. (Review by Omar Ali Khan, film historian at www.bobbyspakoras.com)

== Cast ==
- Shaan
- Saima
- Moammar Rana
- Sangeeta
- Nirma
- Tariq Shah
- Shafqat Cheema

== Film's super-hit songs ==
For all film songs, music composer was Wajahat Attre and film song lyrics were written by Saeed Gillani.

- "Jogi, Jogi, Jogi Tere Ishq Ne Keeta Rogi", Sung by Saira Nasim
- "Jag Jeondeyan De Mele", Sung by Naseebo Lal
