= Naag aur Nagin =

- Directed by: Jamshed Naqvi
- Written by: Rukhsana Noor
- Produced by: Jamshed Naqvi
- Starring: Saima; Moammar Rana; Shafqat Cheema; Babar Ali; Veena Malik; Badar Munir; Tabinda; Hina Khan; Somia Ghazal; Irfan Khoosat
- Cinematography: Azhar Burki
- Edited by: K. D. Mirza
- Music by: M. Ashraf, Salman Ashraf; Film song lyrics: Saeed Gillani, Riaz ur Rehman Saghar, Rukhsana Noor
- Production companies: Evernew Studios, Lahore
- Release date: 2005
- Running time: 148 minutes
- Country: Pakistan
- Language: Urdu

Naag aur Nagin is a 2005 Pakistani supernatural drama film which was released on 31 December 2005. It was directed and produced by Jamshed Naqvi and written by Rukhsana Noor. The film features Saima Noor and Moammar Rana in leading characters of serpents along with Shafqat Cheema, Badar Munir, Veena Malik, Babar Ali, Irfan Khoosat and Tabinda. The plot of the film revolves around two serpents Sawak (Moammar Rana) and Beena (Saima) who have disguised themselves in the form of human beings. Their relationship is affected when Sawak falls for a bubbly girl Farwa (Veena Malik) who belongs to an influential family.

== Plot ==
The story revolves around Beena and Sawak as they become humans from snakes after being together for a century. After becoming a human, Sawak is working as a businessman where company's admin Changez has become his rival and wants to destroy his professional as well as his personal life. Later, Sawak deceives the love of his life Beena and seeks to attract Farwa which agitates Beena and she finds different ways to get Sawak back. Farwa is a happy-go-lucky girl who is unaware that Sawak is actually a serpent. Farwa's childhood friend Saju secretly loves her but did not express his feelings in front of her.

After several failed attempts to destroy Sawak's life, Changez finally learns that he and Beena are serpents and tries to openly reveal this secret but loses his life during the process. In the end, Beena and Saju team-up and succeed to unite with their respective lovers, Sawak and Farwa.

== Cast ==
- Saima as Beena
- Moammar Rana as Sawak
- Shafqat Cheema as Changez
- Babar Ali as Saju
- Veena Malik as Farwa
- Badar Munir as Dilbar Jan
- Tabinda as Shaadan
- Hina Khan
- Somia Ghazal
- Irfan Khoosat
- Sweety Naz
- Sitara Awan

== Music ==
The music director is M. Ashraf, while Rukhsana Noor, Saeed Gillani and Riaz ur Rehman Saghar have written the songs. A. Nayyar, Azra Jehan, Ameer Ali, Saira Naseem, Humaira Channa and Waris Baig are the film song singers.
