= Toofan (2002 film) =

2002 film

- Movie Poster
- तूफ़ान
- Directed by: Pervaiz Rana
- Produced by: Bao Muhammad Shafiq
- Starring: Shaan; Resham; Arbaaz Khan; Moammar Rana; Nargis; Saima
- Music by: Wajahat Attre
- Release date: 26 July 2002
- Country: Pakistan
- Language: Urdu

Toofan is a 2002 Pakistani Urdu film starring Shaan, Saima, Resham, Laila, and Arbaaz Khan.

== Cast ==
- Shaan as Mujrem Daud
- Saima
- Resham
- Nargis
- Laila
- Arbaaz Khan as ASP Arbaaz
- Moammar Rana as Ashwani
- Asif Khan
- Shafqat Cheema as (Ashwani partner)
