= Asoo Billa =

2001 film directed by Hasnain

- Directed by: Hasnain
- Starring: Shaan, Sana, Babar Ali, Naghma, Nargis, Adeeb, Tariq Shah, Humayun Qureshi
- Music by: Zulfiqar Ali; Film song lyrics: Khawaja Pervez, Saeed Gillani
- Release date: 29 June 2001
- Country: Pakistan
- Language: Punjabi

Asoo Billa is a 2001 Pakistani Punjabi language action revenge film. It became a sizeable and surprising hit in 2001. The film is directed by the Punjabi film director Hasnain, who has produced films like Nikah (1998 film) and Naukar Tey Malik (1982).

== Plot ==
Asoo's (Shaan) father, who works in a local warehouse finds that "poe-durr" (heroin) is being smuggled from the warehouse and he being the upright, virtuous (idiotic) type decides that he must go to the police to blow the whistle on the nefarious drug smuggling operation going on under his own nose at the behest of his employers.

Asoo's dad meets a terrible fate, as the police turns out to be a party to the drug smuggling ring. Instead of rewarding the l man for his civic sense and courage, they beat him to a pulp. Then the old man is fraudulently charged with the theft of Rupees 200,000, humiliated and thrown in prison. Meanwhile, a shell-shocked Asoo arrives at the police station where he is told that unless he furnishes the money his father has been accused of stealing, matters would get out of hand. When Asoo fails to turn up with the money on time, the corrupt officer turns up at his home and humiliates Asoo's mother and hits her and causes the dupatta to fall off her head. This indignity for Asoo is the last straw and as he arrives at the Police Station in a fury, only to find his dad being pummeled. This for young Asoo is too much to take, and the mild mannered Asoo is transformed into a drooling, axe-wielding maniac who proceeds to bludgeon to death what seems like the entire local police force.

The next day in court, Asoo pleads guilty to murder and is sentenced to death so vehemently by the judge that he snubs his nib while writing the word death. Now the blood bath begins as his friend Ghiasia whisks Asoo away from jail in a deadly grenade attack. Asoo takes refuge with Sana the gold-hearted prostitute who shows up habitually to launch into an energetic dance complete with pelvic thrusting and torso twisting. Asoo Billa becomes the local Robin Hood, stealing from the rich to provide for the destitute and now it remains to be seen if he can complete his mission of destroying all his enemies before he is himself struck down.

== Cast ==
- Shaan Shahid
- Sana Fakhar
- Babar Ali
- Nargis
- Humayun Qureshi
- Tariq Shah
- Naghma
