= Badmash Gujjar =

2001 film by Sameer Butt

- Directed by: Sameer Butt
- Written by: Nasir Adeeb
- Starring: Saima; Shaan; Moammar Rana; Nirma; Saud; Shafqat Cheema
- Music by: Robin Ghosh and Ustad Tafu
- Release date: 17 December 2001
- Country: Pakistan
- Language: Punjabi

Badmash Gujjar is a 2001 Punjabi-language Pakistani movie by director Masood Butt, starring Shaan, Saima, Moammar Rana, Nirma, and Saud.

== Plot ==
Shaan is a charming, rustic, God-fearing local who honours and reveres his local Maulvi (priest) and hangs out at the local Madrassah where his brother memorizes the verses word for word. Shaan is of the best Gujjar kind, his name Shareef means, he is a God-fearing, peace-loving, humble sort of person even at things that may annoy people.

This ('Shareef Gujjar')'s best friend Bhola (pronounced Pohla) played by Moammar Rana is a loud, thoughtless buffoon who just about manages a paan stall. His greatest problem is his infatuation with the local prostitute Nirma. She does recognize true love in Bhola even if he isn't quite what she was hoping for. One day some villainous goons led by Saud and Cheema swagger into town and make their way to Nirma's kotha (brothel) where she is booked to entertain. When Pohla hears of this indignity, he arrives at the Kotha where a terrible shoot-out follows. To cut a long story short, Nirma is saved from a life as a tawaif by Rana, who is then framed by the police and imprisoned.

Meanwhile, Cheema and Saud hunt for Nirma so that they can force her to return to the Kotha. Eventually their search for Nirma leads them to Rana's best buddy Shareef who is having a celebration for his brother who has just memorized every single word of the scriptures, no less than a Herculean task. The goons gatecrash the celebrations and demand Nirma but when they are met with resistance, they gun down the celebrating lad mercilessly with no regard for his recent memorizing of the holy book. Finally 'Shareef Gujjar' realizes that in order to survive and compete in this horrid world, one has to have a change of name as well as a change of heart. So he announces very loudly no less than five times that he is now to be known as 'Badmash Gujjar' rather than 'Shareef Gujjar', and as if to prove his point, he guns down about 60 policemen in the next 30 seconds.

== Film's super-hit song ==
- "Gora Mukhra Tay Zulfan Challay Challay" Sung by Naseebo Lal, film song lyrics by Khawaja Pervez and music by Ustad Tafu
