= Channa Sachi Muchi =

2010 film

- Directed by: Ijaz Bajwa
- Written by: Rukhsana Noor
- Produced by: Ijaz Bajwa
- Starring: Moammar Rana; Saima Noor; Babar Ali; Hina Shaheen; Naghma; Mehr Hassan; Shafqat Cheema; Irfan Khoosat; Iftikhar Thakur
- Music by: Zulfiqar Ali
- Release date: 16 April 2010
- Country: Pakistan
- Language: Punjabi

Channa Sachi Muchi (2010) is a Punjabi-language Pakistani film directed and produced by Ijaz Bajwa.

According to Bajwa, it is one of the most expensive films ever made in the history of Pakistan, and proclaimed the film as "a revival of Pakistani cinema." It is the first Pakistani film to incorporate digital intermediate treatment and post-production from Adlab, Mumbai. This movie was based on a love story from the 1947 Partition of India period. It was a big hit of 2010 Punjabi Cinema, and was released in the Indian province Punjab and Australia.

== Plot ==
Pooja, a Hindu girl, and Bao, a Muslim boy are in love. Bao succeeds in winning Pooja's love. However Sooria, who is Pooja fiancé, is also in love with her. Similarly, Lajo, who is engaged to Bao, is waiting for the love of her life.

== Cast ==
- Moammar Rana
- Saima Noor
- Babar Ali
- Hina Shaheen
- Naghma
- Mehr Hassan
- Shafqat Cheema
- Irfan Khoosat
- Iftikhar Thakur

== Music ==
Music of this flm was by Zulfiqar Ali with film song lyrics by Khalil-ur-Rehman Qamar. Film songs were sung by Azra Jehan, Naseebo Lal, Harash Deep and Babul Supriyo.

== Awards ==
- The film won the Best Film Of The Year 2010 award on Pakistan Media Award in 2011.
- Saima Noor won the Best Film Heroine award on Pakistan Media Award in 2011.
