= Bulandi (1990 film) =

1990 film

- Directed by: Javed Fazil
- Written by: Syed Noor
- Produced by: Aslam Butt
- Starring: Nadeem; Samina Peerzada; Reema Khan; Shaan
- Cinematography: Kamran Mirza
- Music by: M. Arshad
- Distributed by: Daata Films
- Release date: 21 September 1990
- Country: Pakistan
- Language: Urdu

Bulandi (Urdu: بلندی) is a 1990 Pakistani Urdu feature film, directed by Javed Fazil. Its producer is Aslam Butt, a Lollywood film starring Nadeem, Samina Peerzada, Reema Khan, Shaan. Introducing new actors Reema and Shaan in this film.

== Plot ==
The film starts off by showing the relationship of Nadeem and Samina Peerzada, They soon end up having a baby boy, Shaan. Shaan is friends with Reema, who belongs to a family much richer than his family. The first encounter was when Shaan (one or two years older than Reema) gave a doll to a crying Reema, when he was only around four years of age. The families then split, leaving the two friends separated.

Once older, they meet each other without knowing their past, having a disgusted perception of each other. While Reema's jogging, Shaan accidentally splashes her with mud ... This causes her to do the same on him, but instead of a bit of mud, she drops him in the mud, while he's on his bicycle. After their first unpleasant meeting, they somehow fall in love. Once returning home ,Reema finds out that her father has planned her marriage with somebody she does not love. The father does this for greed of money. Reema refuses and spends her time with Shaan.

Shaan's parents meet their son's childfriend and his lover and accept their relationship. They go to Reema's father's home to ask for his daughter's hand. He rejects the offer. Nadeem begs him, but he does not give in. Nadeem's wife, with a fatal heart injury, dies of a heart attack.

== Cast ==
- Nadeem
- Afzaal Ahmed
- Samina Peerzada
- Reema Khan as Reema
- Shaan Shahid as Shaan
- Madiha Shah
- Faisal Rehman as Ali

== Film songs ==
Film musical score was by M. Arshad and film song lyrics were by Masroor Anwar.

1. Aakhri saans tak tujh ko chahoon ga, Sung by Mehnaz Begum, Akhlaq Ahmed
2. Phoolon mein, kalion mein, ankhon ki galion mein, Mehnaz Begum
3. Aa palkon ki chhaon mein, mein geet tera ...
4. I Love You, Reema ... I Love You, Shaani ... Mehnaz Begum, A. Nayyar
5. Kahan geya who tera waada ... (sad version) Mehnaz Begum, Akhlaq Ahmed
6. Sawan pyar ka pehla sawan ... Mehnaz Begum, Ehtisham Ali Khan Abbasi
7. Mera naam, tera naam ... (sad version) Mehnaz Begum
