= Gulabo =

Pakistani film

- Directed by: Sangeeta
- Written by: film story adapted from the novel by Razia Butt
- Produced by: Nazia Aslam
- Starring: Shaan; Saima; Resham; Raheela Agha
- Music by: Zulfiqar Ali
- Release date: 2008
- Country: Pakistan
- Language: Punjabi

Gulabo is a 2008 Pakistani Punjabi language film by Sangeeta, with music composed by Zulfiqar Ali and song lyrics by Saeed Gillani.

== Cast ==
- Shaan
- Resham
- Babar Ali
- Saima
- Raheela Agha
- Shamil Khan
- Fareeha Jabeen
- Nasir Chinyoti
- Iftikhar Thakur

== Soundtracks ==
- "Paake Paritaan Wey Mein Mar Gai Aan" Sung by Azra Jehan, film song lyrics by Saeed Gillani and music by Zulfiqar Ali
- "Piplaan Di Chaawain Beith Ke Aa Kariye Gallan Pyar Diyyan" Sung by Azra Jehan, film song lyrics by Saeed Gillani and music by Zulfiqar Ali

== Accolades ==
Ceremony	Category	Result
8th Lux Style Awards	Best Film	Nominated
