= Ghunda Raj =

1994 Pakistani film

Gunda Raaj
- Directed by: Saeed Rana
- Written by: Mohammad Saleem Murad
- Produced by: Syed Mehmood Shah
- Starring: Sultan Rahi; Saima; Umer Shareef; Nargis; Jan Rambo; Khushboo; Humayun Qureshi; Shafqat Cheema; Naghma; Adeeb; Afshan Qureshi
- Cinematography: Khalid Mehmood; Sadiq Moti
- Edited by: M. Ilyas
- Music by: Zulfiqar Ali
- Production company: Arshad Productions
- Release date: October 14, 1994 (Pakistan)
- Running time: 160 minutes
- Country: Pakistan
- Language: Punjabi

Ghunda Raj (Punjabi:غنڈہ راج) is 1994 Pakistani action film. It was directed by Saeed Rana and produced by Syed Mehmood Shah.

== Cast ==
- Sultan Rahi as Sher Ali
- Saima as love interest of Sher Ali
- Umer Shareef as Dewana
- Nargis as love interest of Dewana
- Jan Rambo as Mastana
- Khushboo as love interest of Mastana
- Naghma as Mother of Sher Ali
- Adeeb as Police inspector
- Humayun Qureshi as Abeel
- Tariq Shah as Jabar Khan
- Shafqat Cheema as Son of Abeel
- Asim Bukhari as Police inspector
- Afshan Qureshi

== Soundtrack ==
Gunda Raaj

Soundtrack album
- Released: October 14, 1994
- Recorded: 1994
- Genre: Film soundtrack
- Length: 21:34
- Language: Punjabi
- Label: Delite Music
- Director: Saeed Rana
- Producer: Syed Mehmood Shah; Lyrics; Saeed Gillani; Singers; Noor Jehan; Qari Saeed Chishti; Rana Saeed; Music director Zulfiqar Ali

=== Track listing ===
No.	Title	Artist(s)	Length
1.	"Kanda Kud Ke Pair Wichoon"	Noor Jahan	3:45
2.	"Gutku Gutku Bol Bol"	Rana Saeed, Noor Jahan	4:57
3.	"Akhyaan Wich Bulyaan Wich"	Noor Jehan	3:05
4.	"Kala Kala Yaar Mera Kala"	Noor Jehan, Rana Saeed	4:23
5.	"Piron Ka Pir Hai"	Qari Saeed Chishti	6:23
