= Saira Khan (actress) =

Pakistani former actress

- سائرہ خان
- Years active: 1996–2011
- Awards: Lux Style Award (2006)

Saira Khan is a Pakistani former film and television actress. She is known for her acting in Ghunghat and Dream Girl. She left showbusiness for her faith.

== Career ==
Saira Khan is from Multan. She ran away from home because of her poor matriculation result, fearing that her father would treat her harshly. In Lahore, she met a studio owner who arranged her photoshoot, and delivered her portfolio to a film director. Her portfolio impressed the director, and he signed her for his new project. Saira worked in both media, film, and television. She also performed in several music videos. Her successful feature films include Ghunghat (1996) and Dream Girl (1997) — in which, she played prominent roles. Her successful television series are Prandah (1998); and the drama that led her to fame, Beti (2005).

Saira left showbusiness, calling the industry full of lies and deceit. She is now living in Johar Town, Lahore along with her husband and children. She has started taking part in preaching activities of Islam, and observes ruband.

== Television ==
=== Drama serials ===
Year	Drama Serial	Channel	Character
1996	Ghubar	PTV	
1998	Baadban	PTV	
2001	Sawan	PTV	
2003	Dil Lagi	PTV	
2004	Dil He Ke Diya He	PTV	
2005	Beti	PTV	
2005	Apnay Huye Paraye	PTV	
2006	Khwab Nagar	PTV	

== Filmography ==
#	Year	Title	Director	Language	Notes
1	1996	Ghunghat	Syed Noor	Urdu	debut
2	1997	Dream Girl	Sangeeta	Urdu	
3	1998	Ehsas	Sangeeta	Urdu	
4	1999	Guns and Roses	Shaan	Urdu	
5	1999	Da Pakhtun Leone	Shaan	Pashto	
6	1999	Aik Aur Love Story	Sajjad Ali	Urdu	
7	2000	Ham Khilari Pyar Kay	Iqbal Kashmiri	Urdu	
9	2000	Jungle Queen	Syed Noor	Urdu	
10	2001	Daldal	Sangeeta	Urdu	
