= Buddha Gujjar =

2002 film

- Film poster
- Directed by: Syed Noor
- Written by: Syed Noor
- Produced by: Haji Chaudhry Faqeer Mohammad, Chaudhry Shahbaz Ali
- Starring: Shaan; Resham; Saima
- Music by: Zulfiqar Ali
- Production company: Pak Nishan Films
- Release date: 6 December 2002
- Country: Pakistan
- Language: Punjabi

Buddha Gujjar is a 2002 Pakistani Punjabi-language action, drama film.

== Cast and crew ==
- Syed Noor is the film director.
- Yousuf Khan as Buddha Gujjar

== Accolades ==
| Ceremony | Category | Recipient | Result |
|---|---|---|---|
| 2nd Lux Style Awards | Best Film | Buddha Gujjar | Nominated |
| 2nd Lux Style Awards | Best Film Actor | Yousuf Khan | Nominated |

== See also ==
- Lollywood
- Badmash Gujjar
