= Shahzad Rafique =

Pakistani film director

Shehzad Rafique
- Born: Gujranwala, Punjab, Pakistan
- Occupations: Film director; filmmaker
- Years active: 1996–present

Shahzad Rafiq (also spelled Shehzad Rafique) is a Pakistani film director. The films he has produced and directed include Nikah, Ghunghat, Rukhsati, Salakhain and Mohabbataan Sachiyaan. His films have been presented at several film festivals in Asia. He introduced many new faces in Lollywood, notably Ahsan Khan in Nikah (1998), Ahmed Butt and Sajid Hasan in Salakhain (2004), Adnan Khan and Maria Khan in Mohabbatan Sachiyaan (2007) and Wiam Dahmani in Ishq Khuda (2012).

== Filmography ==
=== Director ===
Year	Film	Language	Starring
2001	Rukhsati	Urdu	Moammar Rana, Meera, Mustafa Qureshi, Veena Malik
2004	Salakhain	Urdu	Ahmed Butt, Meera, Zara Sheikh
2007	Mohabbataan Sachiyaan	Punjabi	Veena Malik, Adnan Khan, Babrak Shah, Maria Khan
2012	Ishq Khuda	Punjabi	Shaan Shahid, Humaima Malick, Wiam Dahmani, Ahsan Khan, Meera, Saima Noor
2016	Salute	Urdu	Ajab Gul, Saima Noor

=== Producer ===
Year	Film	Language
1996	Ghunghat	Urdu
1998	Nikah	Urdu

the best film in his two decade career is nikah that's consider as classic in cinema of 90s of lollywood

== Films in festivals ==
- 1997 - Ghunghat in Tashkent international film festival
- 1998 - Ghunghat in Dubai Film Festival
- 1999 - Nikah in SAARC film festival, Sri Lanka
- 2004 - Ghunghat, Nikah and Rukhsati in Beijing film festival, China
- 2005 - Salakhain in Kara Film Festival, Karachi
- 2008 - Mohabbtaan Sachiyaan in South Asian film festival, India
- 2010 - Mohabbtaan Sachiyaan in Muscat International Film Festival
- 2011 - Mohabbbtaan Sachiyaan and Shackles in SAARC film festival, Sri Lanka
