= Shareeka =

2012 Pakistani film

- Directed by: Syed Noor
- Written by: Syed Noor
- Produced by: Safdar Malik
- Starring: Shaan; Saima; Mustafa Qureshi; Bahar Begum
- Cinematography: Masood Butt
- Music by: Ustad Tafu
- Release date: 20 August 2012 (Eid-ul-Fitr)
- Country: Pakistan
- Language: Punjabi

Shareeka is a 2012 Pakistani Punjabi-language film written and directed by Syed Noor.

== Plot ==
The movie is based upon the lives of seven conservative families living together in one 'Haveli' in a village in Punjab, Pakistan.

== Cast ==
Actor
Shaan Shahid
Saima
Mustafa Qureshi
Irfan Khoosat
Afzaal Ahmed
Achi Khan
Bahar Begum
Naghma Begum

== Release ==
The film was released on Eid-ul-Fitr, 20 August 2012.
