= Azra Jehan =

Pakistani singer

- Occupation: Film playback singer
- Relatives: Saima Jehan (her now active singer daughter)
- Awards: Nigar Awards in 1997 and 1999

Azra Jehan is a Pakistani playback singer. She is the recipient of Nigar Award which was presented to her twice.

== Family ==
Azra Jehan is related to the Pakistani renowned singer, Noor Jehan who is her paternal aunt. Azra Jehan has a daughter named Saima Jehan who also is a singer.

== Career ==
- Azra Jehan's Best Songs and Albums
- Azra Jehan's Film Songography

== Awards ==
- Nigar Award in 1997 and 1999

== Filmography ==
=== Punjabi ===
1. Ameer Khan - 1989
2. Mujrim - 1989
3. Allah Waris - 1990
4. Jangju Goreelay - 1990
5. Khandani Badmash - 1990
6. Khtarnak - 1990
7. Nageena - 1990
8. Mard - 1991
9. Nadira - 1991
10. Nigahen - 1991
11. Mastan Khan - 1991
12. Nargis - 1992
13. Henna - 1993
14. Laat Sahib - 1994
15. Lahoria - 1997
16. Choorian - 1998
17. Nikki Jai Haan (1999 film)
18. Mehndi Waley Hath- 2000
19. Buddha Gujjar - 2002
20. Majajan- 2006
