= Sangam (1997 film) =

1997 film

- Directed by: Syed Noor
- Written by: Rukhsana Noor
- Produced by: S B Hussain
- Starring: Resham; Shaan; Saleem Sheikh; Sana; Tamanna; Talish
- Music by: Amjad Bobby
- Release date: 4 July 1997
- Running time: 143 minutes
- Country: Pakistan
- Language: Urdu

Sangam (Urdu: سنگم, lit. 'Confluence') is a 1997 Pakistani romantic feature film, directed by Syed Noor and starring Resham, Shaan, Saleem Sheikh and Sana. It was a comeback movie for Shaan, and the film debut of actress Sana.

== Plot ==
A patient's rare disease prevents him from breathing natural air. He has to permanently live in a glass-made room. His fate changes when he falls in love with female pop-singer, Resham, for whom he breaks his glass-house, putting his life in danger.

== Cast ==
- Resham as Resham
- Shaan as Jaan
- Saleem Sheikh as Sonny
- Sana as Dr. Sana
- Talish as Nanoo

== Awards ==
This film won 4 Nigar Awards in 1997:

- Nigar Award for Best Actor (Shaan)
- Nigar Award for Best Supporting Actress (Sana)
- Nigar Award for Best Song Writer (Rukhsana Noor)
- Nigar Award for Best Female Singer (Humaira Channa)
