= Salute (2016 film) =

- Theatrical release poster
- Directed by: Shahzad Rafique
- Written by: Shahzad Rafique
- Based on: Real-life events
- Produced by: Shahzad Rafique; Ghufoor Butt; Haji Arshad Mehmood
- Starring: Ali Mohtesham; Saima Noor; Ajab Gul; Nayyar Ejaz; Pervaiz Kaleem; Adnan Khan; Rashid Mehmood; Jalal Haider; Mahnoor; Shehraz
- Cinematography: Adil Askri
- Edited by: Adeel pk
- Music by: Robin Ghosh (Late); Aamir Munawar
- Production company: Cinetainment Production
- Distributed by: IMGC Distribution Club
- Release date: 2 December 2016 (Pakistan)
- Running time: 160 min
- Country: Pakistan
- Languages: Urdu, Pashto
- Box office: Rs. 4.5 million (US$16,000)

Salute is a 2016 Pakistani biographical film directed, written and produced by Shahzad Rafique. The film is based on the life of martyr Aitzaz Hasan who confronted a suicide bomber, preventing his attempt to detonate a bomb in his school, saving 2,000 lives. The film stars Ali Mohtesham, Ajab Gul and Saima Noor in leading roles.

The film was distributed by IMGC Global Entertainment and released nationwide on 2 December 2016. The film received positive reviews from critics but was a box-office failure.

== Plot ==
The film details the life of Shaheed Aitzaz Hasan Bangash, a student from Hangu, Pakistan, who, on 6 January 2014, confronted a suicide bomber outside his school. He wrestled with the terrorist to prevent him from entering his school where some 2,000 students were in attendance that day.

The Government of Pakistan posthumously bestowed upon him the Sitara-e-Shujaat (Star of Valour).

== Cast ==
- Ali Mohtesham as Shaheed (martyr) Aitzaz Hasan
- Ajab Gul as Mujahid Ali Bangash (Aitzaz's father)
- Saima Noor as Aitzaz's mother
- Adnan Khan
- Nayyar Ejaz
- Rashid Mehmood
- Pervaiz Kaleem
- Jalal Haider
- Sardar Shaukat
- Ahsan
- Manzar Baig
- Mahnoor
- Mirza Ali Baig
- Umer Shahzad
- Nazar Gilani
- Ahmad
- Mirza Moneb
- Atta Muhammad Khan
- Sheraz

== Production ==
On the first anniversary of Aitzaz Hassan's death, Shahzad announced at the Lahore's Alhamra Arts Complex that he would make a film titled 'Salute' which would be a biopic of Aitzaz's life. Saima Noor and Ajab Gul were cast in lead roles and would play the role of Atizaz's parents. Shahzad confirmed that the film's post-production work would be done in state-of-the-art studios in the United States and Bangkok. The TV rights for the film are owned by Urdu 1.

=== Filming ===
Due to security issues and the nature of the film, Shahzad was unable to shoot the film in the Tribal Areas of Pakistan. Instead, the major parts of the film were shot in Azad Kashmir in Mirpur and Kotli.

== Release ==
The film was originally slated for a May 2015 release but was postponed three times. A teaser for the film was released online on 11 Aug 2016. A theatrical trailer of film was released on 7 September 2016. IMGC Distribution Club distributed the film in Pakistan nationwide on 2 December 2016. Pakistan TV premiered the film on 6 January 2019, the anniversary of Aitzaz's death.

== See also ==
- List of Pakistani films of 2016
- List of biographical films
