= Deewane Tere Pyar Ke =

1997 film

- Directed by: Syed Noor
- Written by: Syed Noor
- Produced by: Sajjad Gul
- Starring: Jia Ali; Moammar Rana; Badar Munir; Nadeem; Yasmeen Ismail; Deeba; Sardar Kamal; Irfan Khoosat; Raja Callikan
- Music by: Amjad Bobby
- Distributed by: EverNew Pictures
- Release date: 7 November 1997
- Country: Pakistan
- Language: Urdu

Deewane Tere Pyaar Key (Urdu: دیوانے تیرے پیار کے, English title: Love Crazy) is an Urdu language film which was released on 7 November 1997.

It was directed by Syed Noor and produced at Evernew Studios.

== Plot ==
This film story is about a girl named Kiran, daughter of a Pakistani man and an Indian woman living in Mauritius. This girl comes to Pakistan to visit her grand parents' grave and she loses her passport and the cash money with her. Then she meets a poor boy in Lahore who helps her. They fall in love. The girl returns to Mauritius. The boy, Nomi, had promised her that he would come to Mauritius after her. Her uncle forced him to not come to Mauritius by influencing the Country's embassy in Pakistan. Nomi travels illegally. Kiran's marriage breaks. Nomi gets caught as a terrorist. While he was struggling in Mauritius he met khan lala who becomes his friend. Meanwhile, khan lala gathers his people in Mauritius in support of nomi to prove him innocent. A Court orders Nomi to be deported. In the plane, he finds out that Kiran and her parents had also boarded the same plane going back to Pakistan.

== Cast ==
- Moammar Rana as Nouman (Nomi)
- Jia Ali as Kiran
- Badar Munir as Khan Lala
- Nadeem as father of Kiran
- Yasmeen Ismail as mother of Kiran
- Deeba as Nomi's mother
- Sardar Kamal as Nomi's friend
- Irfan Khoosat as Kiran's uncle
- Raja Callikan as friend of villain

== Awards and nominations ==
Year	Award	Category	Awardee	Nominated work	Result	Ref.
1997	Nigar Awards	Best Film	Deewane Tere Pyar Ke	Deewane Tere Pyar Ke	Won	
1997	Nigar Awards	Best Director	Syed Noor	Deewane Tere Pyar Ke	Won	
1997	Nigar Awards	Best Script Writer	Syed Noor	Deewane Tere Pyar Ke	Won	
1997	Nigar Awards	Best Musician	Amjad Bobby	Deewane Tere Pyar Ke	Won	
1997	Nigar Awards	Best Cinematographer	Aakif Malik	Deewane Tere Pyar Ke	Won	
1997	Nigar Awards	Best Comedian	Sardar Kamal	Deewane Tere Pyar Ke	Won	
