= Jungle Queen (2000 film) =

2000 film

- Directed by: Syed Noor
- Written by: Rukhsana Noor
- Produced by: Safdar Khan, Safdar Malik
- Starring: Saima, Moammar Rana, Shafqat Cheema
- Music by: M. Arshad; Film song lyrics by Saeed Gillani and Ahmad Anees
- Production company: S.S. Pictures
- Release date: 17 March 2000
- Running time: 110 minutes
- Country: Pakistan
- Language: Urdu

Jungle Queen is a 2000 Pakistani film directed by Syed Noor and written by his then-wife, Rukhsana Noor. The film stars Saima (a.k.a. Saima Noor after marrying director Syed Noor in 2005) as the title character. Actress Saima plays a double role.

In the beginning, the title character, played by Saima, is secretly married to a wealthy man. After discovering that she is pregnant, her husband tries to kill her by throwing her in a river. She ends up landing on an island and given shelter by animals. She gives birth to a baby girl and dies, when the girl is five years old. That girl later grows up like Tarzan and that character is also played by Saima.

== Cast ==
- Saima
- Moammar Rana
- Afzal Khan
- Saira Khan
- Khushboo
- Shafqat Cheema
- Nawaz Khan
