= Irfan Khoosat =

Pakistani TV and film comedian

- عرفان کھوسٹ
- Born: 9 June 1952 (age 74); Okara, Punjab, Pakistan
- Occupations: Actor; Comedian; Director; Producer
- Years active: 1969–present
- Known for: Playing the role of 'Direct Havaldar' in TV drama Andhera Ujala (1984-1985)
- Spouse: Zahida Butt (m. 1973; died 2002)
- Children: 9, including Sarmad Khoosat
- Awards: Nigar Award in 1985; Pride of Performance in 2001

Irfan Khoosat (Punjabi, Urdu: عرفان کھوسٹ) is a Pakistani actor, director, producer and comedian.

He is famous for his comic role as Havaldar Karamdad in the TV series Andhera Ujala (1984–1985) in which he portrayed a simpleton and a blabbermouth character of a low-ranked policeman.

He is also well-known as a stage comedian.

== Early and personal life ==
Irfan Khoosat was born in Okara, Punjab.

His father Sultan Khoosat, who died when Irfan was nine, was a painter, a former employee of Radio Pakistan and himself an actor and comedian. His maternal grandfather Mughal Basheer was also an actor, appearing in the 1962 Urdu-language film Chiragh Jalta Raha.

He has been married three times, including to Zahida Butt, a PTV newscaster, and has nine children, including notable film and TV director and actor Sarmad Khoosat and Kanwal Khoosat, who's also a director, screenwriter and actress. His first wife Zahida Butt died in 2002.

== Early career ==
Irfan Khoosat got his first breakthrough as a child artist with Radio Pakistan, when he replaced an actor for the show Ultay Pultay.

== Career ==
=== Actor ===
Irfan Khoosat began his acting career with the Punjabi-language movie Kochwan in 1969 and even if he's better known for his work on television he would eventually appear in more than 100 films, with 66 in Punjabi, 39 in Urdu and a single movie in Pashto, Banke Lalya which released in 2013.

=== Director ===
Irfan Khoosat has directed the 1985 Punjabi-language film Direct Hawaldar, also acting in it, based on his famous role from Andhera Ujala.

He has also directed a television serial, Karam Daad Aur Jaffer Hussain, a spin-off of Andhera Ujala.

He has directed plays as well, including Tokray Thallay, which was staged at Lahore's Alhamra Arts Council in 2010.

=== Producer ===
Irfan Khoosat has produced numerous television serials, including Aao Kahani Buntay Hain (2011), directed by his daughter Kanwal, but concentrating mainly on comedy dramas such as Do Aur Do Chaar (2002) and Shashlik Xtra Hott (2011), both written and directed by his son Sarmad.

Telefilms that he has produced include Tamasha Ghar (2003), directed by Sarmad, and Hernaam Kaur (2003), written and directed by Sarmad, an adaptation of a Manto short story about the partition.

== Selected filmography ==
=== Films ===
Year	Title	Director	Producer	Language
1976	Zaib-un-Nisa			Urdu
1977	Jabroo			Punjabi
1979	General Bakht Khan			Urdu
1981	Khan-e-Azam			Punjabi
1982	Aangan			Urdu
1985	Hum Say Hay Zamana			Urdu
1985	Direct Hawaldar	Yes		Urdu
1986	Nazdeekiyan			Urdu
1986	Joora			Punjabi
1991	Watan Kay Rakhwalay			Urdu/Punjabi
1997	Deewane Tere Pyar Ke			Urdu
1998	Dupatta Jal Raha Hai			Urdu
1998	Choorian			Punjabi
2000	Tere Pyar Mein			Urdu
2000	Mehndi Waley Hath			Punjabi
2003	Qayamat – A Love Triangle In Afghanistan			Urdu
2005	Naag aur Nagin			Urdu
2005	Koi Tujh Sa Kahan			Urdu
2006	One Two Ka One			Urdu
2007	Jhoomar			Urdu
2010	Channa Sachi Muchi			Punjabi
2011	Bol			Urdu
2012	Shareeka			Punjabi
2014	The System			Urdu
2015	Dekh Magar Pyaar Say			Urdu
2015	Main Manto			Urdu
2018	Donkey King			Urdu
2019	Wrong No. 2			Urdu
2019	Zindagi Tamasha		Yes	Urdu
2022	Tere Bajre Di Rakhi			Punjabi
2022	Kamli		Yes	Urdu
2026	Lali		Yes	Punjabi

=== Television ===
Year	Title	Role	Producer	Channel
1975	Such Gup	Politician		PTV
1975	Taal Matol			PTV
1979	Alif Laila	Malik		PTV
1982	Alif Noon	Seth		PTV
1983	Samundar	Ibrahim		PTV
1983	Ragon Main Andhera	Muharrar		PTV
1984	Andhera Ujala	Havaldar Karam Dad		PTV
1986	Hazaron Raaste	Boota Khan		PTV
1986	Sacha Jhoot	Mehmood's father		PTV
1990	Bau Train	Passenger		PTV
1992	Sachyar	Azhar		PTV
1992	Hath Ghari	Jeda		PTV
1993	Un Dithay Rog	Rehmoo		PTV
1993	Fareb	Najeebullah		PTV
1994	Taangay Waala	Taya		PTV
1995	Teen Bata Teen	Mistri		PTV
1997	Ashiyana	Rehmat		PTV
1999	Comedy Theater	Different roles.		PTV
1999	Aahlna	Jeela		PTV
2000	Kanch Kay Par	Malik Zaman		PTV
2001	Shashlik		Yes	PTV
2007	Ullu Baba	Peera Ditta		Apna Channel
2008	Kothi No. 156			Hum TV
2010	Rangeel Pur	Ilam Deen		PTV Home
2011	Aao Kahani Buntay Hain	Different roles.	Yes	PTV Home
2012	Larka Karachi Ka Kuri Lahore Di	Tau Ji		Express Entertainment
2012	Ashk	Ramzan		Geo TV
2012	Quddusi Sahab Ki Bewah	Maulavi Saheb		ARY Digital
2013	Aunn Zara	Zara's grandfather		A-Plus TV
2013	Galti Se Mistake Ho gayi	Murad - father of Waheed		Hum TV
2014	Sadqay Tumhare			Hum TV
2015	Ishq Ibadat			Hum TV
2015	Kaisay Tum Se Kahoon	Anamta's father		Hum TV
2015	Preet Na Kariyo Koi	Fayyaz		Hum TV
2015	Surkh Jorra	Sarmad		Hum Sitaray
2015	Pardes	Kabeer		Hum Sitaray
2016	Khuda Aur Muhabbat (season 2)	Dilawar		Geo Entertainment
2017	Sammi	Riaz		Hum TV
2017	Meherbaan	Dua's father		A-Plus TV
2017	Baaghi	Fauzia's father		Urdu 1
2017	Shayad	Dada		Geo TV
2018	Noor ul Ain	Qasim		ARY Digital
2018	Aakhri Station	Train ticket checker		ARY Digital
2018	De Ijazat	Dua's father		Hum TV
2018	Belapur Ki Dayan	Rehmat		Hum TV
2018	Chakkar	Sajad		BOL Entertainment
2018	Kabhi Band Kabhi Baja	Express Entertainment		
2019	Anaa	Daneen's grandfather		Hum TV
2019	Janbaaz	Havaldar Karam Dad		Express Entertainment
2020	Dushman e Jaan	Ahsan		ARY Digital
2022	Ishq Pagal Karay	Quddoos		TV One
2022	Mrs and Mr Shameem	Umaina's father		ZEE5

== Awards and recognition ==
He won a Nigar Award for his comic role in the 1985 film Hum Se Hai Zamana.

- Pride of Performance Award in 2001 by the President of Pakistan
