= Choorian (1998 film) =

1998 Pakistani film

- Theatrical release poster
- Directed by: Syed Noor
- Written by: Nadeem Shahid Nadeem
- Produced by: Haji Faqeer Muhammd
- Starring: Moammar Rana; Saima Noor; Nargis; Babar Butt; Shafqat Cheema; Irfan Khoosat
- Cinematography: Naseeruddin
- Music by: Zulfiqar Ali
- Production company: Pak Nishan Films
- Distributed by: Hi-Tech Entertainment
- Release date: 16 October 1998
- Country: Pakistan
- Language: Punjabi
- Box office: Rs. 20 crore (US$720,000)

Choorian (Punjabi: چوڑیاں, transl. Bangles) is a 1998 Pakistani Punjabi-language action romantic film, directed by Syed Noor and produced by Haji Faqir Mohammad. The film stars Moammar Rana, Saima, Babar Butt (Pakistani Actor ) and Nargis in leading roles. Choorian is one of Pakistan’s highest-grossing films of all time.

The film is love story. A city boy Bakhtu (Moammar Rana) is sent to live with his uncle back in the village. He soon falls in love with his uncle's elder daughter Billo (Saima). Billo lives like a servant in her own home, and does all the chores which are overseen by Bahar, her stepmother. Bahar treats her like a slave throughout the movie while her two daughters live like queens. The movie was shot in Jia Bagga village of Lahore district. in 2006 it remade in India Majajan (2008)

== Plot ==
Bakhtu is a young man living in the city. He is repeatedly involved in fights to defend the honour of women to the point that his mother, Rashida fears for his life. She is afraid that he will become like his father, who became a murderer, or be killed. She begs her brother to help her since Bakhtu does not listen to her. He takes Bakhtu to his village. Bakhtu is instantly enamoured with his cousin and childhood friend, Billo. She is ill-treated by her stepmother and stepsisters and does all the work. She is uneducated while her stepsisters have passed Grade 10. Bakhtu's aunt, Bahar Begum, is interested in him for Sammiya, her own daughter, who has expressed her interest in him. Billo prevents Bakhtu from fighting with Makha Natt when he finds out that he has a habit of ogling her.

Sammiya tries to win him over, but Bakhtu is uninterested and confesses his love to Billo. They try to keep their growing relationship a secret, but Sammiya notices and feels threatened. She tells Bakhtu she loves him and tries to entice him by dancing for him in the rain. He is upset by her behaviour and when she keeps touching him he finally slaps her. Sammiya points out Billo holding hands with Bakhtu to Bahar, when they go to a carnival and disappear. When the couple returns, they are confronted by the family. Billo is accused of having a loose character. Bakhtu loses his temper and calls his aunt a 'churail' (witch) and declares that her daughter (Sammiya) is the same as her. His uncle beats him and kicks him out of the house. Bakhtu declares that no one will ever be able to separate him and Billo and leaves. Billo sneaks away and brings Bakhtu food. He brings her home, but the couple is caught by Sammiya. Bakhtu's uncle orders Bakhtu to leave the village if he cares at all for his honour. He refuses, saying he would rather die.

His uncle journeys to the city to beg Rashida to take her son back before he shames him before the village. Meanwhile, Bahar Begum is fixing Billo's engagement with Makha Natt. Rashida begs Bakhtu to leave and he cannot refuse. As Bakhtu leaves, Billo runs after him and breaks her bangles, she is heartbroken. She is too late and watches his train leave. She is forcefully engaged to Natt.

Bakhtu cannot bear the separation from Billo and sneaks away in the night. He arrives armed to apply mehndi (henna) to Billo's hands before Chaudhry's name can be written on them. He promises to marry her in two days' time. He is confronted by Makha Natt and his men. Bakhtu kills many of them and is wounded as well. He has a chance to kill Makha, but leaves him alive so that he can marry Billo. He himself disappears.

On the day of Billo's wedding to Makha, Sammiya asks her why she is smiling. She tells Billo that Bakhtu was killed by Makha Natt. She replies that she knows that Bakhtu will come to marry her. Bakhtu arrives on horseback to take his bride. The 'maulvi' and witnesses arrive to solemnise the marriage. Bahar Begum refuses to allow it, claiming that he cannot marry her without her permission. Billo's father has a change of heart and gives his permission, blessing her. Bakhtu's mother arrives as well. The couple is married as Bahar Begum waits for Makha Natt and his men to arrive. Sammiya seats her sister on the horse with her husband and sends her off wishing her happiness. They narrowly escape Natt as Billo's father stands in their way, taking on the cavalry singlehandedly. Bahar Begum is killed in the firing.

The men catch up to Bakhtu and Billo in the forest. Bakhtu shoots many down, but is wounded. The situation appears hopeless until his uncle arrives, joining the fray. Bakhtu's uncle is severely wounded by Natt before Bakhtu kills him. He blesses the couple, asking them not to leave the village and to care for his family before he dies in their arms.

== Cast ==
- Moammar Rana as Bakhtu
- Saima Noor as Billo
- Muzaffar Adeeb
- Bahar Begum
- Babar Butt
- Shafqat Cheema
- Sardar Kamal
- Abid Khan
- Irfan Khoosat
- Nargis
- Azhar Rangeela
- Deeba
- Naghma

== Production ==
In 2024, Syed Noor revealed that he initially rejected Mommar's casting because his young age and he and Moammar's father were good friends.

== Soundtrack ==
Track list
No.	Title	Singer(s)	Length
1.	"Dhola Way Gal Sun Dhola"	Azra Jehan
2.	"Karan Main Nazara Jadon Ohdi Tasvir Da"	Ameer Ali
3.	"Laiyan Laiyan Main Tere Naal Dholna"	Azra Jehan
4.	"Nehre Aa Zalma Ve"	Saira Naseem
5.	"Sukh Mahi Naal Ley Gaya"	Nusrat Fateh Ali Khan
6.	"Tor Suttan Choorian Te Khol Suttan Waal"	Saira Naseem, Sain Khawar Hussain
7.	"Uchi Thaan Tay Yaari Layi"	Saira Naseem, Anwar Rafi
8.	"Udd Kothe Utton Kanwa Way"	Saira Naseem, Ameer Ali

== Awards ==
Year	Award	Category	Recipient(s)	Result
1998	Nigar Awards	Best Film	Haji Faqir Mohammad	Won
1998	Nigar Awards	Best Director	Syed Noor	Won
1998	Nigar Awards	Best Script Writer	Rukhsana Noor	Won
1998	Nigar Awards	Best Actor	Moammar Rana (Great Uncle of Saima Anwar)	Won
1998	Nigar Awards	Best Actress	Saima	Won
1998	Nigar Awards	Best Supporting Actor	Shafqat Cheema	Won
1998	Nigar Awards	Best Supporting Actor (villain)	Babar Butt (as Makha Natt)	Won
1998	Nigar Awards	Best Musician	Zulfiqar Ali	Won
1998	Nigar Awards	Best Lyricist	Ahmed Aqeel Rubi	Won
1998	Nigar Awards	Best Cinematographer	Naseeruddin	Won
1998	Nigar Awards	Best Playback Singer (Female)	Saira Nasim	Won
1998	Nigar Awards	Best Playback Singer (Male)	Ameer Ali	Won

== Box office ==
Choorian opened in 22 cinemas across Pakistan and earned a total of ₨.200 million in its one-year run. Choorian became the third highest-grossing film on 23 November 2013 after the record was broken by Waar and Khuda Kay Liye.

== See also ==
- List of highest-grossing Pakistani films
- List of Pakistani films of 1998
