= Tere Bajre Di Rakhi =

Pakistani film

- Theatrical Poster
- Directed by: Syed Noor
- Written by: Syed Noor
- Produced by: Safdar Malik
- Starring: Saima Noor; Babar Ali; Iftikhar Thakur; Abdullah Khan; Jannat Mirza
- Music by: Zulfiqar Ali
- Release date: 3 May 2022
- Running time: 143 Minutes
- Country: Pakistan
- Language: Punjabi

Tere Bajre Di Rakhi is a 2022 Pakistani Punjabi-language film written and directed by Syed Noor, with music composed by Zulfiqar Ali. It stars Saima Noor, making a comeback in the Punjabi film industry after 6 years. The other cast includes Nadeem Baig, Mustafa Qureshi, Iftikhar Thakur, Babar Ali along with the debutant Abdullah Khan and Jannat Mirza. The film was released on Eid-ul-Fitr 2022.

== Cast ==
- Saima Noor as Taari
- Amir Qureshi as Sultan Bakht
- Abbas Arzoo as Fateh Muhammad
- Babar Ali as Alam (cameo)
- Abdullah Khan as Shah Bakht
- Jannat Mirza as Lali
- Shafqat Cheema as Dawar
- Naghma Begum as Taari's Mother
- Agha Majid as Maju Pehlwan
- Saleem Albela
- Iftikhar Thakur
- Irfan Khoosat as Lachi's Father
- Khushboo as Laachi

== Production ==
Filmography of Tere Bajre Di Rakhi began in December 2019. Pakistani TikTok star Jannat Mirza and Abdullah Khan are in the lead roles. Most of the shooting has been done at Syed Noor's Farmhouse in Shergarh DISTRICT.The film is produced by Muhammad Safdar Malik.
