= Aik Aur Love Story =

1999 film

- Theatrical release poster
- Directed by: Sajjad Ali
- Written by: Sharif Ali
- Produced by: Mushtaq Ahmed
- Starring: Sajjad Ali; Saira Khan; Nirma; Saleem Sheikh
- Cinematography: Sadiq Moti
- Music by: Waqar Ali
- Release date: 9 July 1999
- Country: Pakistan
- Language: Urdu

An audio sample of "Aik Aur Love Story (theme)"

Aik Aur Love Story (Urdu: ایک اور لو اِسٹوری English: One More Love Story) is a Pakistani Urdu language film directed by pop singer Sajjad Ali. It was also the soundtrack to his music album released in 1999.

== Music ==
Music was composed by music director Waqar Ali.

- Aik Aur Love Story (1999)
- Dua Karo
- Jhoole Lal
- Kya Sama Hai
- Lari Adda
- Marina Marina
- Mausam Mein
- Pata Bata Do
- Sohni Lagdi, O' Meinun Sohni Lagdi
- Tum Se Pyar Hai

== Awards ==
- Nigar Award for Best Music Director in 1999 by Waqar Ali.
