= Zill-e-Shah =

2008 Pakistani film

- Directed by: Shaan Shahid; Nadeem Hassan
- Written by: Muhammad Pervez Kaleem
- Produced by: Fayyaz Khan; Sheikh Zia
- Starring: Shaan Shahid; Saima; Noor Bukhari; Mustafa Qureshi; Shafqat Cheema; Nayyar Ejaz
- Cinematography: Akif Malik
- Edited by: Mateen Quddus
- Music by: Zulfiqar Ali Atre; M. Arshad
- Release date: 5 October 2008
- Running time: 189 Mins
- Country: Pakistan
- Language: Punjabi

Zill-e-Shah is a 2008 Pakistani Punjabi-language film. It is the sequel to another Punjabi film from 2006, Majajan.

== Plot ==
Kulsoom (Noor) is engaged to Sarwar Shah (Babar Butt), but she is deeply in love with Zill-e-Shah (Shan), whom she knows from childhood. So Kulsoom's marriage is sealed, but in an encounter Zill-e-Shah kills Sarwar, therefore he is sent to jail for his murder.

Then an unfortunate incident occurs, when Kulsoom marries Abid Shah (Shafqat Cheema), the elder brother of Sarwar. Noor is in discomfort, but so is Zill-e-Shah, as he gives up his life of luxury, and goes in the realm of dancing girls and becomes an alcoholic. Soon he meets Sitara (Saima) a dancer, who he falls in love with.

== Cast ==
Actor	Character/role
Shaan Shahid	Zille Shah
Noor Bukhari	Kulsoom
Saima Noor	Sitara
Mustafa Qureshi	Shah Hussain
Deeba	Shabano/Shah Bibi
Nayyar Ejaz	Murad Shah
Shafqat Cheema	Abid Shah
Babar Butt	

== Film release ==
Zill-e-Shah became the first film in the history of Lollywood to be re-released in cinema houses across the country, within only a few weeks of it completing its first run at the box-office.

== Awards ==
Ceremony	Category	Recipient	Result
8th Lux Style Awards	Best Film	Zill-e-Shah	Nominated
8th Lux Style Awards	Best Film Actor	Shaan Shahid	Won
8th Lux Style Awards	Best Film Actress	Saima Noor	Nominated

== Production ==
Made on a budget of around two crore rupees, Zill-e-Shah attracted much popular attention because of its print ads but also due to its promotional videos that ran on the various local TV channels.

The producer said: "The entire post-production work of Zill e Shah was done in Mumbai's famous Adlabs. It happens to be one of the world's most expensive production houses. Whoever had a chance to watch the rushes simply loved the film. I was hoping for a grand premiere in India, but I don't know if that will be possible now, given the current political situation between the two countries."
