= Yeh Wada Raha =

- Directed by: Sangeeta
- Written by: Jaffar Arsh
- Produced by: Perviaz Kaleem
- Starring: Arbaaz Khan; Resham; Shaan; Zara Sheikh; Nirma
- Cinematography: Khalid Riaz; Faisal Bukhari
- Release date: 2003
- Country: Pakistan
- Language: Urdu

Yeh Wada Raha is a 2003 Pakistani Urdu language film directed by Sangeeta.

== Story ==
Zara Sheikh plays the character of a girl-next-door living with her blind mother. Nirma plays the daughter of a mafia boss, who loses his life to Shaan's gun-toting adventures one day. Saud is the honest journalist (with a Mr. Ripley look) and Arbaz Khan is the useless son-in-law (ghar damad) who has vengeance and hatred for almost everyone without a reason. The characters are baseless with hardly any convincing reason to their presence in the film. And most of them roll over dead in the gruesome action clashes in the film. But before dying they do manage to take the time out to sing and dance with campfires, waterfalls, and Karachi's beaches as some of the backdrops.

== Full cast ==
- Shaan
- Arbaaz Khan
- Zara Sheikh
- Nirma
- Pervaiz Kaleem
- Nadeem
- Saud
- Shafqat Cheema

== Accolades ==
Ceremony	Category	Recipient	Result
3rd Lux Style Awards	Best Film Director	Sangeeta	Nominated
