= Majajan =

2006 film

- Theatrical release poster
- Directed by: Syed Noor
- Written by: Rukhsana Noor
- Produced by: Saima; Syed Noor
- Starring: Shaan Shahid; Saima; Madiha Shah; Saud; Shafqat Cheema; Iftikhar Thakur
- Cinematography: Waqar Bokhari
- Edited by: Aqeel Ali Asghar
- Music by: Zulfiqar Ali Attre
- Release date: 24 March 2006
- Running time: 2 hours 36 min
- Country: Pakistan
- Language: Punjabi

Majajan is a 2006 Pakistani Punjabi-language drama film directed by Syed Noor. Majajan is a love story Syed Noor says he "made most passionately". Inspired by the life of Baba Bulleh Shah and his 'Ishq' with his 'Murshad'.

The film was a huge success and celebrated its diamond jubilee at the Pakistani cinemas. The film's success led to the creation of a sequel title Zill-e-Shah, which was released in 2008.

== Synopsis ==
Zil-e-Shah (Shaan), an unhappily married man who belongs to the Syed clan, falls in love with a courtesan, by the name of Taari (Saima) who arrives to perform in his village. His wife (Madiha Shah) and family condemn their relationship.

== Release ==
The film was released on 24 March 2006, across Pakistan.

Majajan has celebrated Diamond Jubilee (100 weeks) in Lahore's cinemas. It also did Solo Silver Jubilees on its two main cinemas Metropole and Sozo Gold in Lahore.

== Inspiration ==
In a newspaper interview, director Syed Noor said, ""When I read the verses of Baba Bulleh Shah I promised myself that I will make a film on the great Sufi poet's 'ishq' and I was looking for an opportunity to do that. So, I discussed the story with my wife (Rukhsana Noor) who is also a writer. She converted it into a full-fledged script and finally I created Majajan... (Saima) didn't compromise on quality, and spent lavishly on making Majajan a great film".

Majajan's soundtrack consists of 10 songs of which only half have been used. The director said Shaan is playing this kind of role for the first time. Music is composed by the music director Zulfiqar Ali and film song lyrics are by Khawaja Pervez, the Sufi poet Bulleh Shah and Aqeel Rubi.

== Cast ==
- Shaan Shahid as Zil-e-Shah
- Saima as Taari
- Madiha Shah
- Saud
- Shafqat Cheema
- Iftikhar Thakur
- Goshi Khan
- Sardar Kamal
- Sher Khan
- Rashid Mehmood

== Awards ==
Ceremony	Category	Recipient	Result
6th Lux Style Awards	Best Film	Syed Noor & Saima Noor	Won
6th Lux Style Awards	Best Film Director	Syed Noor	Won
6th Lux Style Awards	Best Film Actor	Shaan Shahid	Won
6th Lux Style Awards	Best Film Actress	Saima Noor	Won

== See also ==
- Syed Noor
- Jhoomar
- Lollywood
