= Billi =

- Directed by: Syed Noor
- Written by: Syed Noor
- Starring: Saima; Nadeem; Meera; Noor
- Music by: M. Arshad
- Release date: 21 July 2000
- Country: Pakistan
- Language: Urdu

Billi is a 2000 Pakistani Urdu horror film directed by Syed Noor starring Meera, Noor and Saima.

This horror film is supposedly based on a true story about a victim turning into a scum-busting avenger.

== Plot ==
The film opens with a scene where fiery criminal lawyer Meera is being gang-raped to put a rapist behind bars, but the judge rules against her. Though the rapist walks free, is there a power who can save him from the justice of the “Billi” — a shadowy figure dressed in a black cat suit who has taken to the streets at night rounding up all scum and sleaze and dishing out her own brand of justice to chilling effect.

There is an earnest police officer (Uthba) determined to nab the cat but he does not appear to be making much headway as this cat appears to have at least nine lives. In her brutal quest for justice, she does not even spare the lawyer representing the rapist who was basically just doing his job. She corners him one dark, stormy night and cuts off his tongue so that he can never twist a case to his benefit as he had done with the rape case. Uthba tries to marry Meera but she manages to castrate him and leaves him in darkness.

== Cast ==
- Meera as Lawyer
- Noor Bukhari as Pinki (Billi)
- Saima Noor (Mother of Pinki)
- Nadeem Baig (Father of Pinki)
- Saud as Police Officer 'Shoaib'
- Ahsan Khan as Rapist (Brother of Police Officer)
- Afshan Qureshi (Mother of Police Officer)
- Arbaaz Khan as Journalist Zohaib (Brother of Police Officer)
- Mehboob Sultan as Rapist
