= Guns and Roses: Ik Junoon =

1999 Pakistani film

- Directed by: Shaan
- Produced by: Tanvir Fatima Rehman
- Starring: Shaan; Faisal Rehman; Farooq Zameer; Meera; Resham; Saira Khan
- Production company: X-9 Productions
- Distributed by: Mandviwalla Entertainment
- Release date: 8 January 1999
- Language: Urdu

Guns and Roses: Ik Junoon (Urdu script: گنز اینڈ روزز—اک جنون "Guns and Roses, an Obsession") is a 1999 Pakistani film directed by & starring Shaan (in his feature directorial debut), Resham, Meera and Faisal Rehman. The film music was composed by M Arshad.

The movie is mainly known for its soundtrack which included hits like Jeena Hai Jeena Tau Hai, Khat, and Qeher and its action sequences. Tanvir Fatima Rehman produced the film.

== See also ==
- film Pal Do Pal (1999 film)
