= Nikah (film) =

Ni kah
- Directed by: Sangeeta
- Produced by: Shehzad Rafiq
- Starring: Shaan Shahid; Reema Khan; Nirma
- Music by: Robin Ghosh; M. Arshad; Film song lyrics by: Riaz ur Rehman Saghar; Saeed Gillani; Abrar-ul-Haq
- Release date: 5 June 1998
- Country: Pakistan
- Language: Urdu

Nikah (Urdu: نِکاح) is a 1998 Pakistani romantic drama film and a remake of the 1977 film Aina. The film is directed by Sangeeta and produced by Shahzad Rafique. Reema won the Best Actress Nigar Award for her role in the movie.

== Synopsis ==
Nikah tells the story of Bisma, a young woman from a wealthy family, and Faraz, a man from a middle-class background. Despite their different social standings, the two fall in love and get married. However, after marriage, class differences and familial expectations start straining their relationship.

The true test of their bond comes when their young son is diagnosed with cancer. As they struggle with emotional and financial turmoil, Bisma and Faraz must put aside their differences to save their child. The film explores how love, patience, and resilience can help overcome even the harshest challenges

== Reception ==
The film was a huge success, and celebrated its platinum jubilee at the Pakistani cinemas.

== Cast ==
- Reema as Bisma
- Shaan as Faraz
- Nirma
- Ahsan Khan
- Goshi Khan
- Laila
- Deeba
- Abid Khan
- Mishi Khan
- Nazo
- Riffat Tajalli
- Tamanna

== Soundtrack ==
- GT Road Tay Braikan Laggian Sung by Abrar-ul-Haq
- Yeh Dil Hay Deevana Teray Pyar Ka Sung by Akhlaq Ahmed
- Resham Ka Hai Lahenga Mera

All music is composed by M. Arshad and film song lyrics are by Saeed Gillani, Riaz ur Rehman Saghar and Abrar-ul-Haq.

== Awards ==
- Nigar Award for Best Film (1998)
- Nigar Award for Best Actor (1998)
- Nigar Award for Best Actress (1998)
- Nigar Award for Best Film Director
