= Rukhsana Noor =

Pakistani writer and poet

- Born: Rukhsana Arzoo; 1959
- Died: 12 January 2017 (aged 57–58)
- Occupations: Poet journalist
- Known for: Aa Pyar Dil Mein Jaga; Ilham
- Spouse: Syed Noor (m.1984–2017)

Rukhsana Noor (1959 – 12 January 2017) was a Pakistani journalist, poet and scriptwriter.

She completed her master's in Mass Communications from the University of the Punjab where she later joined as a teacher.

She was married to film director Syed Noor. They had three daughters and a son. Rukhsana, who had been suffering from cancer for several years, died in Lahore in January 2017.

== Works ==
She was known for the following notable works:

- Aa Pyar Dil Mein Jaga
- Ilham
