= Moosa Khan =

2001 film by Shaan Shahid

- Directed by: Shaan
- Produced by: Shaan
- Starring: Shaan; Saima; Abid Ali; Shafqat Cheema; Jan Rambo; Noor
- Music by: Jawad Ahmad (Music/Lyrics)
- Distributed by: Riaz Shahid Films
- Release date: 17 December 2001
- Country: Pakistan
- Language: Urdu

Moosa Khan (Urdu: موسی خان) is a 2001 film which was directed by Shaan. The film starred Saima, Afzal Khan and Shaan.

The film received mixed reviews. Attracting criticism for its portrayal of Hindu characters and the overall narrative, which critics feel promotes Hinduphobia.

== Synopsis ==
The storyline is based around Shaan and Saima. Moosa played by Shaan grows up in a cave due to his father being killed. His father was an Imam (priest) who died in Moosa's hands when a bunch of pandits came and attacked his Mosque. Saima comes along with her father who dies as well when some evil goons attack and she is taken hostage by Shamoon (Shafqat Cheema). What will Moosa do about this?

== Plot ==
The movie is set in a time warp in the colonial subcontinent Kashmirpur and its environs are seemingly inhabited by Muslims, Hindus and Christians. Beautiful white doves (symbolizing peace) also fly around in the foreground in idyllic slow motion while an audience is introduced to the local mosque and its saintly imam (priest) played by Abid Ali. The imam completes his prayer and emerges from the distance as pigeons and doves flutter about in a mad frenzy.

Meanwhile, we are shown that across the way there is a temple where instead of doves of peace, there is a python near a large group of snarling, drooling old men in orange robes, with funky hairstyles who are cringing at the voice of the nearby priest. So enraged are they by his voice that they hatch an evil scheme in collusion with the local godless, firangi goras (white men - who worship only money) to bring about the end to the voice once and for all for good of the world.

As the villains try to gun down the lecturing imam, their guns suddenly ridiculously malfunction by divine intervention and when the Hindus decide to fire some heavy artillery and rocket launchers at the mosque (it appears divine intervention only disables rifles and pistols but not rocket launchers,) the super-human maulvi appears magically leaping in the way of the projectiles, thwarting any attempt at desecrating the mosque by his acrobatics. Then, while in the background people turn from peace mode to crusade mode, the maulvi mumbles a few pious utterances and launches his "tasbees" (holy beads) into the air to see it transform in mid-air into a holy sword. He dramatically catches the falling blade and proceeds to hack to death the entire lot of goons who had attacked the mosque. As the imam finally caves in, he says to his child Moosa, "Sorry Moosa" the maulvi says in slow motion at the death scene, his eyes burning with the fire of vengeance as the maulvi goes to hell.

Moosa grows up in a cave somewhere like a mentally challenged boy, having turned his back on his religion due to the disillusionment that he felt when his father was murdered. He has instead taken to living alone in some distant cave with his horse Sheru to keep him company. Moosa (Shaan) has turned into a cold-hearted mercenary but all that is soon to change with Saima's arrival.

She shows up, dressed to kill with her father. He clearly had his own reasons for bringing his daughter to this place but when the goons start making moves on her, he turns defensive and starts throwing moralizing lecture, and for this he gets shot by one of the goons. Shamoon (Shafqat Cheema) sporting his usual bizarre "get up" with flowing ponytail becomes obsessed by Saima's voluptuousness, Shamoon imprisons Saima. However, in keeping with the film's utterly warped manner, Saima chooses to stab herself to death rather than to compromise her "izzat" (honour) for no reason. Shamoon has her stitched up in the nick of time, yet she remains merely a captive pet for her tormentor, waiting for the first opportunity to flee. Saima is rescued from Shamoon's clutches one night by Moosa and whisked away to freedom, but just when she is beginning to take a fancy to her rescuer, it's revealed that all he intended to do was use her as part of a transaction or agreement. Saima is stunned when Moosa gives her over to another set of captors. Saima begs him not to do this, but he continues to walk away, stone faced and impassive. As Moosa is about to mount onto his horse and ride off into the distance, Saima comes up with an idea; she takes to covering her head with a scarf (in dramatic slow-motion) and starts reciting the words (with added echo effect) of the Quran in a last-ditch effort to get through to the stubborn Moosa. Moosa, supposedly, only with a desire to protect a Muslim looking woman, is moved. When Saima reaches a crescendo with the retort of "Kya tum Moosa nahin ho" (Are you not Moosa?) her words finally seem to hit the right spot and suddenly Moosa assumes the role that his father, the deranged priest had always dreamed of.

Moosa forcefully bludgeons his way through the fully armed opposition and rescues her again and makes away with Saima to the safety of the forest where they are joined by his childhood chum Jan Rambo. Love blossoms and Saima and Moosa get married and build their dream home away from the troubles of the world, but saima never lets him hit cause of size issues, but Shamoon's henchmen are constantly searching every inch of the forest in order to recover Saima and destroy Moosa and it is a matter of time before they discover the mountainside home. Meanwhile, Saima gives birth to a child (whose father is not unknown) and forces her husband to bury his weapons and to take to praying for solace.

One fateful day, while the child and father are away hunting, Shamoon's henchmen show up. There follows the usual bloodbath and mayhem as child and dad return to begin their fight. In one of the more hysterical scenes of the movie, Moosa is performing his prayers when a goon with a large machine gun arrives firing shot after shot at Moosa, but these giant bullets float in Matrix-like slow motion towards the hero and each time by divine intervention they somehow fail to hit their target. In real life however moosa will be more in begging state, anyway. In a moment of sublime ridiculousness, Moosa catches the last bullet in mid-air and tosses it aside disdainfully before striding out, (angels in full battle cry by now) to purge the land of all evil. We hope he falls in a ditch before subjecting us to serious cringe again.

== Cast ==
- Saima
- Shaan
- Noor
- Jan Rambo
- Tariq Shah
- Abid Ali
- Nayyar Ejaz
- Adeeb
- Ahmad Mithu
- Jahangir
- Mughal
- Masood Akhtar
- Hamayun Qureshi
- Shafqat Cheema
- Bidya Rao

== Music ==
Music arrangement and film song lyrics were by Jawad Ahmad.
