= Jhoomar =

2007 film

Jhoomar (2007 film)
- Directed by: Syed Noor
- Written by: Syed Noor; Rukhsana Noor
- Produced by: Safdar Malik; Syed Noor
- Starring: Saima; Moammar Rana; Shafqat Cheema; Irfan Khoosat; Aleena; Durdana Rehman
- Cinematography: Ali Jan
- Edited by: Mateen Qadoos
- Music by: Nijat Ali
- Production company: Paragon Entertainment
- Distributed by: S.S. Entertainment
- Release date: 2 November 2007
- Country: Pakistan
- Language: Urdu

Jhoomar is a Pakistani Urdu film directed by Syed Noor, which was released across theaters in Pakistan on 2 November 2007. The movie has Saima and Moammar Rana in the lead roles.

== Plot ==
The story revolves around Gulaab Bibi (Saima), a village belle who falls in love with an army officer Shahnawaz (Moammar Rana) who is posted in her village along the Pakistan-India border. Shahnawaz hails from a well-off wadera family. His family consist of his brothers and sisters in law. They hope to get him married off to the sister, played by actress Aleena, of one of the babhis. They are not pleased when Shahnawaz brings his newlywed bride, Gulaab to the haveli.

Trouble starts when Gulaab is found to be apparently barren. Her brother-in-law puts pressure on Shahnawaz to marry Aleena so that the family line can continue. Gulaab is eventually kicked out of the house after being falsely accused of having an affair. Despondent, she goes to commit suicide, but accidentally wanders into Indian territory. She is arrested for trespassing and sent to jail.

Eventually, Gulaab transforms from a naïve village girl to a defiant and courageous woman who braves the horrific conditions of the prison. She returns to her husband's home to redeem herself in his eyes, who, in a plot twist, is revealed to be the one suffering from infertility.

== Cast ==
- Saima
- Moammar Rana
- Durdana Rehman
- Shafqat Cheema
- Irfan Khoosat
