= Syed Noor =

Pakistani film director based in Lahore (born 1950)

- Born: Syed Ghulam Mohyuddin Noor; 21 February 1950 (age 76); Lahore, Punjab, Pakistan
- Occupations: Film director, producer, writer and actor
- Years active: 1970–present
- Spouse(s): Rukhsana Noor (died 2017); Saima Noor (Gunshi Begum)
- Awards: Sitara-i-Imtiaz (Star of Excellence) Award by the President of Pakistan in 2013; Won 3 Nigar Awards in 1995, 1996 and 1997

Syed Noor (Punjabi, Urdu: سید نور) (born Syed Ghulam Mohyuddin Noor) is a Pakistani film director based in Lahore.

== Early life and education ==
Syed Ghulam Mohyuddin Noor was born on 21 February 1950 in Lahore, Punjab, Pakistan. He completed his schooling in Lahore and earned a Bachelor’s degree in Journalism from Government Dyal Singh College, Lahore.

== Career ==
=== Screenwriter ===
In 1970, Syed Noor joined the Pakistani film industry as an assistant to director S. Suleman. Noor assisted S. Suleman for 18 feature films, after which, he penned his first script for the film, Society Girl (1976), which was considered the best film of the year. After the success of his first film, Noor became the prime screenwriting talent in the Pakistani film industry and worked with all the prominent directors of the time.

Syed Noor wrote about 250 films from 1976 to 1992. His written scripts and screenplays were both in Urdu and in Punjabi. As a writer, Noor won many awards in his career, including National Award, Nigar Award, Graduate Award, Bolan Award, and Asian Award. During his writing career, he was also offered acting opportunities, which he turned down as his ultimate goal was to direct feature films. He had assisted Pakistani film director S. Suleman for 5 years with the intention of one day directing his own work.

=== Director ===
In 1993, Syed Noor made his directorial debut with the movie, Qasam, which was successful at the box office. During this time, Pakistani cinema was ruled by Punjabi films. Syed Noor began to make films with the intention of reviving Urdu cinema, and his second film Jeeva (1995) and third film Sargam (1995) realized his intent. Noor also introduced a number of new actors in his films, who went on to have illustrious careers in the film industry. With the success of Urdu movies, now Punjabi films began to disappear from cinemas, especially after the murder of Punjabi film superstar, Sultan Rahi. At this point, Noor announced that he would work on Punjabi films and gave his first Punjabi directorial, the super-hit Choorian (1998), which is considered one of the most successful films of Pakistani film industry. The vast success of Choorian was followed by another Punjabi film by Noor, Majajan (2006), which ran in cinemas for even longer than its predecessor.

=== Media education ===
With the intent of teaching filmmaking to a new generation, Syed Noor launched Paragon Studios and Paragon Academy of Performing Arts. Partnering with the Mass Communications Department of Punjab University, Noor began to teach film as a subject. During this time, multiplex cinemas began to be built in Pakistan and film became digitized, which gave new filmmakers excellent opportunities for new material and projects.

== Awards and recognition ==
After writing nearly 300 films, directing 55 films, and winning more than 10 National Awards and many other honors, Syed Noor was awarded the highest civilian honor of Pakistan, the "Sitara-i-Imtiaz" (Star of Excellence) Award by the Pakistani government in 2013.

- Sitara-i-Imtiaz (Star of Excellence) Award by the President of Pakistan in 2013
- Nigar Award for Best Film Director in 1995, 1996 and 1997

== Filmography ==
=== Screenwriter ===
- Syed Noor was the screenwriter for film director Sangeeta's successful film Society Girl followed by over 250 more films.

=== Director ===
Year	Film	Language	Starring
1984	Judai	Punjabi language film	
1987	Lady Smuggler	Urdu	Babra Sharif, Bobita, Sabita, Ismael Shah
1993	Qasam	Urdu	Iram Hassan, Saleem Sheikh, Kaveeta, Nadeem Baig
1995	Jeeva	Urdu	Resham, Babar Ali, Javed Sheikh, Neeli
1995	Sargam	Urdu	Zeba Bakhtiar, Adnan Sami, Nadeem
1996	Hawaien	Urdu	Reema Khan, Saud, Meera
1996	Chor Machaye Shor	Urdu	Resham, Reema, Sahiba, Rambo, Babar Ali
1996	Ghunghat	Urdu	Saima, Resham, Shaan, Andaleeb
1996	Raju Ban Gaya Gentleman	Urdu	Jan Rambo, Meera, Laila, Andaleeb, Mohsin Khan
1997	Uqabon Ka Nasheman	Urdu	Reema Khan, Babar Ali, Jan Rambo, Javed Sheikh
1997	Sangam	Urdu	Resham, Shaan, Sana Nawaz,
1997	Raja Pakistani	Urdu	Nirma, Reema Khan, Babar Ali, Sahiba Afzal,
1997	Deewane Tere Pyar Ke	Urdu	Moammar Rana, Jia Ali, Nadeem, Yasmin Ismail
1998	Muhafiz	Urdu	Saima, Nadeem Baig, Jana Malik, Sahiba Afzal,
1998	Zewar	Urdu	Reema Khan, Babar Ali, Sahiba Afzal, Jan Rambo
1998	Zor	Urdu	Saima, Moammar Rana, Jana Malik
1998	Choorian	Punjabi	Saima, Moammar Rana, Nargis
1998	Deewarain	Urdu	Saima, Reema Khan, Babar Ali,
1998	Dupatta Jal Raha Hai	Urdu	Arbaz Khan, Resham, Saima Noor, Nadeem
1999	Daku Rani	Urdu	Saima, Shaan, Arbaaz Khan,
2000	Mehndi Waley Hath	Punjabi	Saima, Moammar Rana, Nagma,
2000	Angaray	Urdu	Saima, Shaan, Deeba,
2000	Jungle Queen	Urdu	Saima, Moammar Rana, Saira Khan, Jan Rambo,
2000	Billi	Urdu	Saima, Noor, Meera,
2000	Lakhon Main Aik	Urdu	Saima, Moammar Rana, Abid Ali,
2000	Beti	Urdu	Saima, Babar Ali, Moammar Rana, Sana
2001	Daket	Urdu	Saima, Shaan, Moammar Rana, Resham
2001	Chooriyan Nahin Hathkarian	Urdu	Saima, Moammar Rana, Arbaaz Khan
2001	Uff Yeh Beewiyan	Urdu	Saima, Moammar Rana, Reema Khan
2001	Sapne Apne Apne	Urdu	Saima, Moammar Rana, Saud
2001	Baghi	Urdu	Saima, Shaan, Saud
2002	Sholay	Urdu	Saima, Shaan, Reema Khan
2002	Behram Daku	Punjabi	Saima, Shaan, Babar Ali
2002	Buddha Gujjar	Punjabi	Saima, Shaan, Resham
2003	Commando	Urdu	Saima, Shaan, Zara Sheikh
2003	Larki Punjaban	Urdu	Saima, Shamyl Khan, Babar Ali
2004	Hum Aik Hain	Urdu	Saima, Shaan, Shamyl Khan
2006	Majajan	Punjabi	Saima, Shaan, Saud
2007	Jhoomar	Urdu	Saima, Moammar Rana, Aleena
2010	Wohti ley ke jaani ay	Punjabi	Saima, Shaan, Mustafa Qureshi, Iftikhar Thakur
2011	Aik Aur Ghazi	Punjabi	Saima, Heera Malik, Safqat Cheema
2011	Jugni	Punjabi	Saima, Shaan, Moammar Rana
2011	Dane Pay Dana	Punjabi	Saima, Moammar Rana, Haya Ali
2012	Shareeka	Punjabi	Saima, Shaan
2012	Meri Shadi Karao	Bollywood (Syed Noor's debut in India)	Gurdeep Mehndi, Sakhawat Naz
2013	Ik Si Sher	Punjabi	Saima, Shaan Shahid
2013	Devar Bhabhi (television film)	Urdu	Saima, Sami Khan, Saud, Sadia Khan
2017	Chain Aye Na	Urdu	Shehroz Sabzwari, Sarish Khan, Adil Murad, Sobia Khan, Waqar Ali Godhra
2022	Tere Bajre Di Rakhi	Punjabi	Saima Noor, Jannat Mirza, Iftikhar Thakur, Mustafa Qureshi, Shafqat Cheema, Babar Ali, Nadeem Baig, Agha Majid, Naghma Begum
TBA	Price of Honour	Urdu	Atif Naveed, Danyal, Rakshi
TBA	Bhai Wanted	Urdu	Saima, Moammar Rana, Khurram Patras, Danish Nawaz
TBA	Aina 2	Urdu	Shehroz Sabzwari, Nadeem, Shabnam

== See also ==
- Lists of Pakistani films
- Pakistani films of 2010
- Majajan
- Choorian
- Cinema of Pakistan
