= Nirma (actress) =

Pakistani actress and model

- نرما
- Born: Ayesha Jahangir; Lahore, Pakistan
- Occupation: Actress
- Years active: 1996–2014
- Children: 2

Nirma is a Pakistani former Lollywood film actress and model. She started a career in modeling followed by television dramas.

== Early life ==
Nirma was born as Ayesha Jahangir in Kuwait, from where she completed her early education. After the death of her father, she along with her family moved to Lahore. Film producer Ejaz Durrani gave her the stage name Nirma.

== Career ==
Nirma's first play was Ranjish, and she appeared in the television serial Do Chand and Sarkar Sahab. Her debut film was Bazigar, and she later appeared in films such as Laaj, Shararat, Qarz, and Behram Daku. In 1997, she played the role of a stage dancer in the film Dream Girl, which was directed by Sangeeta. Punjabi film credits include Babul Da Wera. She also regularly appeared in Punjabi stage dramas and various music videos.

== Filmography ==
=== Films ===
Year	Film	Role	Note
1996	Bazigar		
1997	Aashqi Khel Nahin		
1997	Dream Girl		
1997	Raja Pakistani		
1997	Qarz		
1998	Nikah (Wedding)		
1999	Dil Main Chhupa Ke Rakhna		
1999	Aik Aur Love Story		
1999	Ghaddar		
2000	Angaray		
2000	No Paisa No Problem		
2000	Kahan Hai Qanoon		
2000	Aag Ka Darya		
2000	Mehndi Waley Hath		
2001	Khanzada		
2001	Baghi		
2001	Daulat		
2001	Sangram		
2002	Ghazi Ilmuddin Shaheed		
2002	Behram Daku		
2002	Baghawat		
2002	Atif Chaudhary		
2002	Allah Rakha		
2002	Chann Mehar		
2002	Araen Da Kharak		
2003	Kaliya		
2003	Laaj		
2003	Yeh Wada Raha		
2003	Shararat		
2014	Sher e Pakistan		

=== Television ===
- Ranjish (1996)
- Laag (1998)
- Poora Chand (1999)
- Khamosh (2004)
- Sarkar Sahab (2007)
- Lamhay

== See also ==
- List of Lollywood actors
