= Nargis (Pakistani actress) =

Pakistani actress

- نرگس
- Born: Ghazala Idrees; 11 August 1974 (age 51); Lahore, Punjab, Pakistan
- Occupations: Actress, comedian, businesswoman
- Years active: 1992-2014
- Notable work: Choorian; Suha Jora
- Spouse(s): Majid Bashir (m. 2016-present); Zubair Shah (m. 2004; div. 2016); Afzal Butt (m. 1996; div. 2004)
- Children: 2: Masooma Syed, Ali Shah
- Parents: Idrees Bhatti (father); Kosar Parveen (mother)
- Awards: 2 Nigar Awards in 1995 and 1997

Nargis (Urdu: نرگس), born Ghazala Idrees, is a Pakistani film actress and stage artist. She has acted in more than 104 films in her career spanning from 1993 to 2018, and was the highest-paid stage artist across the country in 2016.

She is best known for her supporting role in the musical romantic film Choorian (1998 film), which ranks amongst the highest-grossing domestic films of all time. Her other notable films include International Luteray (1994), Ghunda Raj (1994), Soha Jora (2007), and Dushman Rani (2014).

== Incidents of domestic violence ==
In March 2002, Nargis was kidnapped and allegedly assaulted by dismissed police inspector Abid Boxer. She reported that Abid had been intimidating her because she refused to pursue a relationship with him. Abid was accused of establishing strong connections with organized crime and gangsters.

In November 2024, she was reportedly subjected to severe torture by her husband, Inspector Majid Bashir, after she declined to transfer her property into his name.

== Awards and recognition ==
- Nigar Awards for 'Best Supporting Actress' in Punjabi language films Madam Rani (1995) and Kala Raj (1997)

== Selected filmography ==
| Year | Film | Language |
|---|---|---|
| 1983 | Johar Ki Behen | Punjabi |
| 1994 | International Luteray | Urdu/Punjabi |
| 1994 | Ghunda Raj | Punjabi |
| 1994 | Danda Peer | Punjabi |
| 1995 | Madam Rani | Punjabi |
| 1995 | Main Ne Pyar Kiya | Punjabi |
| 1995 | Shartia Mithay | Punjabi |
| 1996 | Aao Pyar Karen | Urdu |
| 1996 | Mummy | Urdu |
| 1997 | Kala Raj | Punjabi |
| 1997 | Mafia | Urdu |
| 1997 | Kuri Munda Razi | Punjabi |
| 1998 | Choorian | Punjabi |
| 1998 | Dopatta | Punjabi |
| 1999 | Hawwa Ki Beti | Urdu |
| 1999 | Kursi Aur Qanoon | Urdu |
| 2000 | Long Da Lashkara | Punjabi |
| 2000 | Yaar Badshah | Punjabi |
| 2002 | Babbu Khan | Punjabi |
| 2004 | Daaman Aur Chingari | Urdu |
| 2007 | Soha Jora | Punjabi |
| 2007 | Ghundi Runn | Punjabi |
| 2009 | Aaj Ki Larki | Urdu |
| 2009 | Suhaagan | Punjabi |
| 2014 | Naseebo | Punjabi |
| 2014 | Dushman Rani | |
