= Saima Noor =

Pakistani actress

- صائمہ نور
- Born: 5 May 1967 (age 59); Multan, Punjab, Pakistan
- Occupations: Actress; model
- Years active: 1987–present
- Spouse: Syed Noor (married 2005–present)
- Awards: Nigar Award in 1999

Saima Noor (born 5 May 1967) is a Pakistani actress who appears in Pakistani films and television dramas. She rose to prominence after starring in the Punjabi film Choorian (1998), which is regarded as one of the highest-grossing Pakistani films of all time. Some of her other notable film credits include Buddha Gujjar (2002), Majajan (2006), and Bhai Log (2011), all of which were commercial successes. She was one of the country's leading film actresses during the 1990s and early 2000s.

Saima's film work spans many genres, including the supernatural film Naag aur Nagin (2005) and the biographical film Salute (2016). She has subsequently also established a career in the Pakistani television industry and has appeared in various television series, including Rang Laaga (2015), Yeh Mera Deewanapan Hai (2015), Babban Khala Ki Betiyann (2018–2019), and Main Manto Nahi Hoon (2025).

In 2005, she married director Syed Noor with whom she has worked on a number of films.

== Early life ==
Saima was born in Multan, Punjab, Pakistan. She belongs to a Pathan family.

== Career ==
=== Film career ===
Nagina Khanum introduced Saima to the film industry, where she made her debut in the 1987 film Greban. Akram Khan directed her second film, Khatarnaak. During her early years in the film industry, she was mostly paired opposite actor Sultan Rahi in Punjabi films but was recognized as a leading actress when filmmaker Syed Noor launched her career in Urdu films. Her biggest commercial success came in 1998 when she starred in the musical-romantic film Choorian which gathered around Rs. 200 million and became the highest grossing Punjabi-language film in Pakistan, thus establishing her as a leading actress in Lollywood. She portrayed the second lead role of Tanya in the acclaimed revenge thriller film Khilona which had Meera and Saud in leading roles. In 2000, she played the character of a fearless girl in the film Jungle Queen, portraying a female Tarzan-type who lives in the jungle, swings on vines, and rides elephants. It was directed by her future husband Syed Noor. In 2005, she appeared as a serpent in the supernatural-fantasy film Naag aur Nagin. In 2011, she played the role of Munniya in the action film Bhai Log, which was a moderate box-office success, earning around Rs. 9.7 million in the first three days of its screening.

In 2012, she was paired opposite Shaan in the family film Shareeka, which had a decent opening on the box-office, accumulating over Rs. 3 million during the first three days of its screening. Saima has also appeared in a biographical drama film called Salute, which was based upon the life of Aitzaz Hasan, a 15-year old student who died as he wrestled with a suicide bomber and prevented him from entering his school.

In 2022, she worked in the Punjabi film Tere Bajre Di Rakhi.

=== Television ===
Apart from films, she has also appeared in a number of television series, including Rang Laaga, Kaneez, Ye Mera Deewanapan Hai, and Mubarak Ho Beti Hui Hai. In 2018, she was signed opposite Sarmad Khoosat in the drama series Lamhay.

== Personal life ==
Despite being romantically linked to Syed Noor, it was not officially revealed that whether she had married him or not. In 2007, during a press conference, Saima publicly stated that she married Syed Noor in July 2005, during the making of their mutual film Majajan.

In 2018, some media publications and online websites reported that Syed Noor had divorced Saima and the two are living separately. However, the couple denied these rumours and released a short clip on social media stating that they are happily married and will never separate.

== In the media ==
Saima was one of the most popular and leading film actresses in Pakistan during the 1990s and early 2000s. In 2017, The Express Tribune published an article on the topic of the lack of new heroines in the revival of Lollywood, in which Saima was cited as being lucky for the industry as she belongs to Southern Punjab. Film critic Omair Alavi from The News International praised her acting credibility and wrote that, "You can see why directors have continued to cast her over the years". In 2010, BBC News dubbed her as the "reigning queen of Pakistan's silver screen" and noted that she is "now one of the biggest names in the industry".

After the decline of Pakistani film industry, Saima made her television debut and went on to become one of the highest-paid actresses in television along with actress Resham who was her contemporary from the 1990s.

== Selected filmography ==
Year	Film
1987	Griban
1994	Zameen Aasman
1994	Saranga
1996	Ghunghat
1998	Choorian
1998	Dupatta Jal Raha Hai
2000	Billi
2000	Jungle Queen
2001	Uff Yeh Beewian
2001	Moosa Khan
2003	Larki Punjaban
2003	Roti Goli Aur Sarkar
2005	Naag aur Nagin
2005	Bau Badmash
2006	Qaidi Yaar
2006	Majajan
2007	Jhoomar
2008	Gulabo
2008	Zill-e-Shah
2010	Channa Sachi Muchi
2010	Wohti ley ke jaani aye
2011	Jugni
2011	Aik Aur Ghazi
2011	Bhai Log
2012	Shareeka
2013	Ishq Khuda
2016	Salute
2022	Tere Bajre Di Rakhi

== Television ==
Year	Title	Role	Network	Ref.
	Nautankee		ATV	
	Sooli		Aaj TV	
2007	Piya Naam Ka Diya	Sitara	Geo TV	
	Kaneez	Malkaan	A-Plus	
2015	Rang Laaga	Shehnaz	ARY Digital	
2015	Yeh Mera Deewanapan Hai	Mehtab	A-Plus	
2017	Mubarak Ho Beti Hui Hai		ARY Digital	
2018	Lamhay		A-Plus	
2018	Babban Khala Ki Betiyann	Ishrat	ARY Digital	
2018	Kho Gaya Woh		BOL Entertainment	
2022-2023	Hook	Maymunah	ARY Digital	
2025	Main Manto Nahi Hoon	Suraiyya	ARY Digital	
2026	Baba Bulleh Shah			

== Accolades ==
Ceremony	Category	Project	Result
1st Lux Style Awards	Best Film Actress	N/A	Nominated
2nd Lux Style Awards	Best Film Actress	Dakoo	Nominated
3rd Lux Style Awards	Best Film Actress	Larki Panjaban	Nominated
3rd Lux Style Awards	Best Film Actress	Commando	Nominated
6th Lux Style Awards	Best Film Actress	Majajan	Won
6th Lux Style Awards	Best Film	Majajan	Won
8th Lux Style Awards	Best Film Actress	Zill-e-Shah	Nominated
8th Lux Style Awards	Best TV Actress (Satellite)	Nautankee	Won
9th Lux Style Awards	Best Film Actress	Nach Ke Yar Manana	Won
15th Lux Style Awards	Best TV Actress	Rang Laaga	Nominated
2nd Pakistan Media Awards	Best Film Heroine	Wohti Lay Kay Jani Aai	Won
3rd Pakistan Media Awards	Best Film Heroine	Jugni	Nominated

== See also ==
- List of Lollywood actors
