= Shaan Shahid =

Pakistani actor, screenwriter and director

Shaan Shahid شان شاہد PP
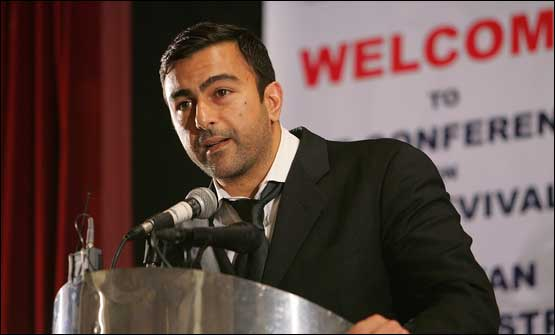
- Shaan speaking at a conference
- Born: Armaghan Shahid; 27 April 1971 (age 55); Lahore, Punjab, Pakistan
- Occupations: Actor; Screenwriter; Director; Producer
- Years active: 1990–present
- Spouse: Amina Armaghan Shahid
- Children: 4
- Parents: Riaz Shahid; Neelo

Armaghan Shahid PP (Urdu: ارمُغان شاہِد; born 27 April 1971), better known by his stage names Shaan Shahid (Urdu: شان شاہِد) or Shaan, is a Pakistani actor, producer, model, screenwriter and director. Shaan has established himself as one of the most popular leading actors of Pakistan.

Shaan started his acting career in 1990 by making his film debut in Javed Fazil's film Bulandi opposite Reema Khan and as of 2014 he has acted in 576 movies, including 388 Punjabi films and 188 Urdu films.

He has won many awards in Pakistan including one Pride of Performance, fifteen Nigar Awards, five Lux Style Awards, one Pakistan Media Award, ARY Film Award.

Shaan is considered as one of the highest-paid film star in Pakistan.

== Early life and education ==
Armaghan Shahid, later known as Shaan, was born in Lahore to director Riaz Shahid and theater, film, and television actress Neelo. His father was an ethnic Kashmiri from Lahore and Muslim, whereas his mother was a Punjabi Christian who converted to Islam. His paternal uncle, Fiaz Shahid, was a cameraman and producer for PTV in Islamabad. He has a younger brother, Sarosh Shahid, who is also an actor, and he has an older sister, Zarqa Shahid.

He started his early education at the prestigious Aitchison College. His first acting venture came at a boy scout bonfire. He won the best actor award in a play called Alif Noon, playing a comedy character, but never took acting seriously as a career. After Aitchison, he left for New York, United States, and joined Newtown High School. Dreaming of being a lawyer, he always thought he had the talent to become one. He stayed in New York for seven years, then returned to Pakistan for a vacation, where he took up the family business, Riaz Shahid Films. At the age of 19, he acted in his first film, Bulandi, which was released in 1990.

== Career ==
=== Actor ===
Shaan made his debut with Bulandi in 1990 opposite another debutante Reema Khan. He has since appeared in hundreds of Urdu and Punjabi language films.

In 2013, he starred in Bilal Lashari's Waar alongside Aisha Khan, Shamoon Abbasi, Uzma Khan, Ali Azmat, and Meesha Shafi. The film opened to positive reviews, and was Pakistan's highest anticipated film at that time. He won the Best actor Award of Viewer's choice at the 1st ARY Film Awards. After the success of Waar, he appeared in Jami and Summer Nicks's O21 with a supporting cast of Aamina Sheikh, Iman Ali, Shamoon Abbasi and Ayub Khoso. In 2015, he starred in Hassan Rana's Yalghaar alongside Adnan Siddiqui, and the film was set to be the most expensive film in the history of Pakistani cinema with an estimated budget of Rs 50 crore.

He has done independent films as well such as the dance-based film Naach (2013) opposite Javed Sheikh, Momal Sheikh and newcomer Neil Uchong and Shahzad Rafique's punjabi romantic film Ishq Khuda alongside Saima, Ahsan Khan and Wiam Dahmani. Shaan has also sung a few songs in his films.

In 2026, he marked his return to Punjabi cinema after years with Bullah.

=== Director ===
Keen on making a difference to filmmaking in Pakistan, Shaan launched himself as a director. He directed his ambitious project Guns and Roses - Ik Junoon, which was released in 1999. The film was produced by the art entrepreneur Tanvir Fatima Rehman. He co-starred with Faisal Rehman, Meera and Resham. The music was scored by M. Arshad, the cinematography was done by Azhar Burki, and it was written by Pervaiz Kaleem. In 2000 he directed Mujhe Chand Chahiye starring himself, Noor, Reema Khan, Moammar Rana, Javed Sheikh and Atiqa Odho. He then directed Moosa Khan (2001), which starred him, Saima, Abid Ali, Jan Rambo and Noor. The film received genuinely positive reviews from critics.

He signed a three-film deal with actress Juggan Kazim in 2008. One film, titled Chup was under pre-production for several years until it was scrapped; the others are still in pre-production. He is working with screenwriter Mashal Peerzada and Pakistani television director and screenwriter Sarmad Sultan Khoosat for his film projects. In 2009, Shaan appeared on ARY Digital's show Happenings which showed him directing a film scene with actress Resham in a Haveli house. In the interview he confirmed he has been making a film, however, not much is known about it. In 2012, he announced that he is set to direct one film that stayed under production for several years, Mission Allahu Akbar opposite Juggan Kazim in Thailand. In 2013, Shaan said his films were on hold as he is involved in his other ambitious acting projects.

In 2017, he directed Arth - The Destination, an official remake of Mahesh Bhatt's Arth (1982), and in 2022 he had directed Zarrar, a spy action thriller film; he also wrote the movies and had the leading role.

In 2026, he directed as well wrote and acted in the psychological thriller Psycho.

=== Television host ===
Shaan joined Geo Television Network and hosted a morning show named Geo Shaan Say on Geo News. But he soon left the show to focus on the development of Lashari's Waar.

== Brand ambassador ==
=== Businesses ===
Shaan endorsed several brands and campaigns, using what his website described as an ability to "project class and elegance". On 17 February 2009, Unilever Pakistan launched their LUX Limited Edition soap at the Pearl Continental Hotel in Lahore, Pakistan. Shaan endorsed Pepsi with singer Ali Zafar to help strengthen the brand in Pakistan. Pakistan's telecom giant Mobilink hosted Shaan as a spokesperson for 'Mobilink Indigo', with the launch of the new face of Mobilink's premium post-paid brand 'Indigo' in 2004. It was projected as the brand for the elite executive and families.

=== Health ===
Shaan was the Goodwill Ambassador for 'One Pack = One Vaccine', a campaign launched by UNICEF, Procter & Gamble and the Ministry of Health in a bid to eradicate tetanus from Pakistan. Shaan has committed himself to the cause and visited areas and cities across the country, including malls and stores in Karachi and Lahore, to bring awareness amongst parents, especially mothers, about this deadly disease and how one can fight to eliminate it.

=== Sports ===
Shaan has a great interest in sports. Shaan joined PSL franchise, Lahore Qalandars as brand ambassador ahead of the second season. After his venture at PSL, he was named the brand ambassador of Kashmir Premier League. In January 2021, he had been named as the brand ambassador for Punjab Sports Board.

== Personal life ==
He is married Amina Shaan (née Banday). They have four daughters: Bahisht-i-Bareen Shahid, Nooriya Shahid, Shahbano Shahid and Raania Shahid.

== Selected filmography ==
Year	Film	Role	Language	Director	Screenwriter	Producer
1990	Bulandi	Shan	Urdu			
1999	Guns and Roses: Ik Junoon		Urdu	Yes		
2000	Mujhe Chand Chahiye	Zain	Urdu	Yes		
2001	Asoo Billa	Asoo	Punjabi			
2001	Musalman	Azad Khan	Urdu			
2001	Moosa Khan	Moosa Khan	Urdu	Yes		Yes
2006	Majajan	Zil-e-Shah	Punjabi			
2007	Khuda Ke Liye	Mansoor	Urdu			
2007	Soha Jora		Punjabi			
2008	Zill-e-Shah	Zill-e-Shah	Punjabi	Yes		
2011	Jugni		Punjabi			
2013	Waar	Major Mujtaba Rizvi	Urdu			
2014	O21	Kashif Siddiqui	Urdu			
2017	Yalghaar	Colonel Asad	Urdu			
2017	Arth - The Destination	Ali	Urdu	Yes	Yes	
2022	Zarrar	Zarrar	Urdu	Yes	Yes	
2026	Bullah	Bullah	Punjabi			
2026	Psycho	Salman Raza	Urdu	Yes	Yes	
TBA	Waar 2	Major Mujtaba Rizvi	Urdu			

== Awards and nominations ==
- Government of Pakistan's Pride of Performance Award (2007)
- 15 Nigar Awards
- 5 Lux Style Awards
- 4 National Film Awards
- Shaan won Best Film Hero on 2nd Pakistan Media Award (2011)

=== Nigar Awards ===
Year	Nominated work and artist	Award	Result
1997	Sangam	Best Actor	Won
1998	Nikah	Best Actor	Won
1999	Jannat Ki Talash	Best Actor	Won
2000	Tere Pyar Mein	Best Actor	Won

=== Lux Style Awards ===
Year	Nominated work and artist	Award	Result
2000	N/A	Best Film Actor	Won
2002	Dakoo	Best Film Actor	Nominated
2003	Commando	Best Film Actor	Won
2006	Majajan	Best Film Actor	Won
2007	Khuda Kay Liye	Best Film Actor	Won
2008	Zill-e-Shah	Best Film Actor	Won
2009	Nach Ke Yaar Manana	Best Film Actor	Won
2014	Waar	Best Film Actor	Nominated

=== Ary Films Awards ===
Year	Nominated work and artist	Award	Result
2013	Waar	Best Actor	Won
2014	Honorary ARY Film Award	Special Contribution to Pakistani Cinema	Won

== See also ==
- List of Pakistani actors
