= Reema Khan filmography =

List of films and television series of Pakistani actress Reema Khan

This is the filmography for the Pakistani actress Reema Khan from film debut in Bulandi in 1990 to her 'Mega Hits' such as Nikah (1998), Mujhe Chand Chahiye (2000) and One Two Ka One (2006) to her own directed movies such as: Koi Tujh Sa Kahan (2005) and Love Mein Ghum (2011).

== Films ==
Year	Production
1985	Qismat
1990	Bulandi
1990	Zehreelay
1990	Sailab
1991	Rambo
1991	7 Khoon Muaf
1991	Ishq
1991	Naag Devta
1991	Khatron Ke Khiladi
1991	Pyar Hi Pyar
1991	Darindgi
1991	Medan - e - Jang
1991	Dil
1992	Shehzada
1992	Dehshat Gard
1992	Aag
1992	Muhammad Khan
1992	Majhu
1992	Chahat
1992	Shama
1992	Sahiba
1992	Ishq Zindabad
1992	Mehbooba
1992	Godfather
1992	Akhara
1993	Hinna
1993	Anjuman
1993	Ruqqa
1993	Subay Khan
1993	Malakhro
1993	Paidageer
1993	Chakori
1993	Sheeda Talli
1993	Chandi
1993	Neelam
1993	Aroosa
1993	Jhootay Raees
1993	Daku، Chor، Sepahi
1993	Betaj Badshah
1993	Teesri Dunia
1993	Wah Kya Baat Hai
1993	Insaniyat
1993	Vardi
1993	Putar Munawar Zareef Da
1993	Ghunda
1993	Aan Milo Sajna
1993	Hathi Mere Sathi
1993	Dunya Meri Jaib Mein
1994	Khandan
1994	Gujjar Badshah
1994	Miss Fitna
1994	Muhalay Dar
1994	Jaan
1994	Naseeb
1994	Beta
1994	Bala Peeray Da
1994	Munda Kashmiri
1994	But Shikan
1994	Zameen Aasman
1995	Munda Bigra Jaye
1995	Muskrahat
1995	Jo Darr Gya Woh Marr Gya
1995	Chaudhry Badshah
1995	Sadak
1995	Akhri Mujra
1995	Madam Rani
1996	Love 95
1996	Talismi Jazeerah
1996	Chor Machaye Shor
1996	Mamla Garbar Hai
1996	Hum to Chale Susral
1996	Hawaien
1996	Lakht-e-Jigar
1996	Sab Se Bara Rupiah
1996	Miss Istanbul
1996	Mummy
1996	Aalmi Ghunday
1996	Be Qabu
1996	Hum Hayn Aapkay Ghulam
1997	Hum Kisi Se Kam Nahin
1997	Umar Mukhtar
1997	Uqabon Ka Nasheman
1997	Mafia
1997	Najaiz
1997	Aulad Ki Qasam
1997	Dunia Hai Dilwalon Ki
1997	Main Khiladi Tu Anadi
1997	Khuda Jane
1997	Hum Tumhare Hain
1997	Krishma
1997	Raja Pakistani
1997	Devar Dewane
1998	Insaf Ho To Aisa
1998	Tu meri Mein Tera
1998	Zor
1998	Nakhra Gori Da
1998	Jise De Maula
1998	Dil Sambhala Na jaye
1998	Zidi
1998	King Maker
1998	Dulha Le Ker Jaongi
1998	Doli Sara Kar Rakhna
1998	Nikah
1999	Waris
1999	Dushman Zinda Rahe
1999	Nikki Jai Haan
1999	Kursi Aur Qanoon
1999	Ik Pagal Si Ladki
1999	Nauker
1999	Dil Tau Pagal Hai
2000	Long Da Lishkara
2000	Yar Chan Wargah
2000	Mujhe Chand Chahiye
2000	Pehchan
2000	Pasand
2000	Sangdil
2000	Khuda Ke Choor
2000	Banarsi Choor
2000	Billo 420
2000	Barood
2001	Jaan Teray Naam
2001	Meri Pukar
2001	Badmash Puttar
2001	Hukumat
2001	Mukhra Chann Warga
2001	Choorian Nahi Hathkarian
2001	Uff Yeh Bivian
2001	Daldal
2001	Ik Jaggar Hor
2001	Mera Mahi
2001	Sangam
2001	Ghunda Tax
2002	Geo Jatta
2002	Khuda Qasam
2002	Babbu Khan
2002	Border
2002	Sholay
2002	Majhoo Da Wair
2002	Sheer-e-Pakistan
2002	Kaun Bane Ga Karorpati
2002	Fire
2003	Shararat
2003	Darinda
2003	Foja Amritsaria
2003	Remand
2003	Meri Awaz Suno
2003	Roti, Goli Aur Sarkar
2004	Amman Ke Dushman
2005	Koi Tujh Sa Kahan
2006	Dulhan Banti Hayn Naseebon Walian
2006	One Two Ka One
2007	Aurat Ek Khilona
2011	Love Mein Ghum
2015	Sanam

=== As director and producer ===
Year	Film	Language	Cast
2005	Koi Tujh Sa Kahan	Urdu	Moammar Rana, Reema Khan, Nadeem Baig, Veena Malik and Babrak Shah
2011	Love Mein Ghum	Urdu	Reema Khan, Jia Ali, Ali Saleem, Javed Sheikh, Afzal Khan, Nabeel Khan, Araida and Johnny Lever

== Television series ==
Year	Production	Role	Notes
2003	Yaad To Ayengey	Maham	Geo TV production
2011	Tarang ("Hero Bannay Ki Tarang Sahi Jodi Ki Talaash")	Herself	ARY Digital
2011	Takkay Ki Ayegi Baraat	Herself	Cameo appearance
2012	Ye Ghar Aap Ka Hua	Herself	Geo TV production
2012	Raati Masha Tola	Zeenat	Opposite Imran Abbas, aired on PTV Home, telefilm
2013	Reema ka America	Herself	A Abroad Media
2018	Croron Mein Khel	Herself	Gameshow
