= List of Pakistani films of 2011 =

List of Pakistani films by year 2011

== Top grossing films ==
The top 7 films released in 2011 by worldwide gross are as follows:

Rank	Title	Studio	Gross	Ref.
1.	Bol	Shoman Productions	Rs. 16.80 crore (US$600,000)	
2.	Love Mein Ghum	R.K. Production / Geo Films	Rs. 4.00 crore (US$140,000)	
3.	Jugni	Paragon Entertainment Group	Rs. 3.20 crore (US$110,000)	
4.	Son of Pakistan	New Vision Productions	Rs. 0.85 crore (US$30,000) (est)	
5.	Bhai Log	Kamran Ch Films / AB Pictures	Rs. 0.35 crore (US$13,000)	
6.	Khamosh Raho	Ghafoor Films	Rs. 0.16 crore (US$5,700)	
7.	Aik Aur Ghazi	Paragon Entertainment	Rs. 0.10 crore (US$3,600)	

== Releases ==
=== April–June ===
Opening		Title	Genre	Director	Cast	Ref.
A P R	08	Parai Dhee	Action, Romance	Hanif Joyea	Babar Ali Sandal, Tabinda, Khawaja Saleem, Qaisar Chodhary.	

Opening		Title	Genre	Director	Cast	Ref.
J U N	10	Khamosh Raho	Drama/Romance	Altaf Hussain	Juggan Kazim, Shaan Shahid, Bahar Begum, Asif Khan, Ghulam Mohiuddin (actor).	
J U N	10	Aik Aur Ghazi	Drama/Action	Syed Noor	Saima Noor, Shafqat Cheema Heera Malik, Haya Ali, Shehbaz Akmal,	
J U N	24	Bol	Drama/Romance	Shoaib Mansoor	Humaima Malick, Atif Aslam, Mahira Khan, Iman Ali, Shafqat Cheema, Manzar Sehbai.	

=== July–September ===
Opening		Title	Genre	Director	Cast	Ref.
A U G	31	Love Mein Gum	Drama/Romance/Comedy	Reema Khan	Moammar Rana, Reema Khan, Nadeem Baig, Javed Sheikh, Afzal Khan (Jaan Rambo), Nabeel Khan, Araida Corbol and Johnny Lever	
A U G	31	Bhai Log	Action/Romance	Syed Faisal Bukhari	Nadeem Baig, Javed Sheikh, Moammar Rana, Saima Noor, Babar Ali, Meera Rubab, Shamoon Abbasi, Noor Bukhari and Aamir Qureshi.	
A U G	31	Jugni	Action/Romance	Syed Noor	Shaan Shahid, Saima Noor, Moammar Rana and Arif Lohar.	
A U G	31	Kafira	Action/Romance	Saleem Murad	Dua Qureshi, Sajjad Ahmed Warriach, Shahid Hameed, Shafqat Cheema, Akram Udass, Sobia, Shahid, Tariq Shah.	

=== October–December ===
Opening		Title	Genre	Director	Cast	Ref.
N O V	7	Danay Pay Dana	Drama/Action	Syed Noor	Saima Noor, Moammar Rana, Haya Ali, Shahid, Zafri Khan, Haidar Rana.	
N O V	7	Thakur 420	Drama/Comedy	Masood Butt	Nargis (Pakistani actress) Iftikhar Thakur, Moammar Rana, Sonu Lal, Dua Qureshi, Nasir Chinyoti	
D E C	16	Son of Pakistan	Action/Drama	Jarrar Rizvi	Shamil Khan, Babar Ali, Babrik Shah, Meera Rubab, Sana Nawaz, Shafqat Cheema, Ghulam Mohiuddin (actor)	

== See also ==
- 2011 in film
- 2011 in Pakistan
