= Moammar Rana =

Pakistani actor and filmmaker (born 1974)

- مُعمّر رانا
- Born: 26 February 1974 (age 52); Lahore, Punjab, Pakistan
- Occupations: Actor; Director
- Years active: 1996–present
- Spouse: Mehnaz Rana (m. 1998; div. 2026)
- Children: 2
- Family: Shafqat Rana (father); Shakoor Rana (uncle); Azmat Rana (uncle); Sultan Rana (uncle); Mansoor Rana (cousin); Maqsood Rana (cousin)

Moammar Rana (Punjabi, Urdu: مُعَمّر رانا; born 26 February 1974) is a Pakistani actor and film director.

He is known for his various Lollywood movie credits, and has also worked on the small screen in Pakistani soap operas and television serials.

== Personal life ==
=== Family ===
Moammar Rana belongs to a cricketing dynasty: his father Shafqat Rana has played Test cricket for Pakistan and twice served as a selector for the national cricket team, his uncle Azmat Rana (d. 2015) played one Test match, another uncle, Shakoor Rana (d. 2001), was a well-known umpire whose two sons Mansoor and Maqsood played a few ODIs, while yet another uncle, Sultan Rana, played first-class matches before becoming a cricket administrator.

=== Politics ===
In 2019, Rana joined the Pakistan People's Party, making the announcement alongside PPP's Chairperson Bilawal Bhutto Zardari.

== Career ==
=== Actor ===
==== Films ====
Moammar Rana made his film debut with Kudiyon Ko Dale Dana (1996) as a second lead actor. He got his first break in Deewane Tere Pyar Ke in 1997, a blockbuster. Moammar's film Choorian (1998) which was directed by Syed Noor became the highest grossing Pakistani Punjabi film earning Rs20 crore (US$4.4 million) at the box office. In 1999, he appeared in the ensemble romantic film Pal Do Pal, which was directed by late Shamim Ara. Some of his other notable releases include Yeh Dil Aap Ka Huwa (2002), Fire (2002), Koi Tujh Sa Kahan (2005), Jhoomar (2007) and Channa Sachi Muchi (2010).

He has worked in the Bollywood film Dobara (2004) with actress Mahima Chaudhry in a special appearance and made his Bollywood debut as a lead role in Ek Second... Jo Zindagi Badal De? (2010) opposite Manisha Koirala and former Miss India Nikita Anand.

In 2018, Rana was seen in the film Azaadi which was based on the issue of Jammu and Kashmir, and was directed and produced by Imran Malik. For his role in Azaadi, Rana increased his fitness training and focused on developing a stoic, intense on-screen presence. He performed his own action sequences, including carrying a 45 kg gun, and described the filming process, especially in remote locations lacking basic amenities, as a physically and mentally demanding experience that made him feel "like a soldier." Despite receiving unfavorable reviews, the film emerged as a success on local box office.

==== Television series ====
Rana distanced himself from Punjabi films early in his career and took a four-year hiatus before relocating to Karachi to begin work on his own film. During this period, he briefly paused to act in a film by Syed Noor and appeared in a few television serials, though he expressed a clear preference for cinema, stating that the big screen held a special charm and suited him best.

=== Director ===
Moammar is set to make his debut as film director for the film Sikander, where he plays the lead actor, which has been in making since 2015. In August 2016, Moammar was reported as saying that the film was at the final stage and he was in talks with cinema owners to exhibit it.

== Selected filmography ==
=== Films ===
Year	Title	Role	Director	Language	Note
1996	Kudiyon Ko Dale Dana			Urdu	
1997	Deewane Tere Pyar Ke	Nouman (Nomi)		Urdu	
1998	Choorian	Bakhtu		Punjabi	
1998	Duniya Dekhe Gi			Urdu	
1999	Ik Pagal Si Larki			Urdu	
1999	Pal Do Pal	Gul		Urdu	
1999	Kursi Aur Qanoon	Naveed Khan		Urdu	
1999	Nikki Jai Haan			Punjabi	
2000	Jungle Queen			Urdu	
2000	Angaray			Urdu	
2000	Mujhe Chand Chahiye	Imran		Urdu	
2000	Mehndi Waley Hath			Punjabi	
2001	Badmash Gujjar	Bhola		Punjabi	
2002	Yeh Dil Aap Ka Huwa	Falak		Urdu	
2002	Fire			Urdu	
2002	Toofan	Ashwani		Urdu	Negative role
2004	Dobara	Cameo appearance		Hindi	Hindi debut
2005	Koi Tujh Sa Kahan	Peeru		Urdu	
2005	Naag aur Nagin	Sawak		Urdu	
2006	One Two Ka One			Urdu	
2007	Jhoomar	Shahnawaz		Urdu	
2008	Kabhi Pyar Na Karna			Urdu	
2010	Haseeno Ka Mela			Urdu	
2010	Ek Second... Jo Zindagi Badal De?	Shantanu Roy		Hindi	Hindi film
2010	Channa Sachi Muchi	Bhau (Bao)		Punjabi	
2011	Love Mein Gum	Ali		Urdu	
2011	Jugni			Punjabi	
2011	Bhai Log	Raja		Urdu	
2016	Saya e Khuda e Zuljalal	SP Haider		Urdu	
2018	Azaadi	Azaad		Urdu	
2018	Market			Urdu	
2020	Mission December			Urdu	
2023	Aar Paar	Arman Singh		Punjabi	
2025	Baap	Samundar Khan		Urdu	
2025	Qulfee	SP Khadim		Urdu	
TBA	Sikander	Sikandar	Yes	Urdu	

=== Television series ===
Year	Title	Role	Network
2001	Hawa Pe Raqs		PTV
2005	Mere Paas Paas	Shariq	Hum TV
2006	Dil, Diya, Dehleez		Hum TV
2006	Banjar		Geo Entertainment
2007	Dil Mera Mera Nahi		PTV
2007	Sirf Tumhare Liye		PTV
2007	Suhana		ATV
2009	Kaisi Hain Doorian		ARY Digital
2010	Uss Paar		ATV
2010	Aankh Salamat Andhay Log	Zahid Jamal	ATV
2010	Love, Life Aur Lahore	Pari Paiker	ATV
2011	Nazar		PTV
2011	Ishq Ibadat		Geo Entertainment
2012	Roshan Sitara		Hum TV
2014	Mehram		Hum TV
2015	Judaai	Ijaz	Geo Entertainment

== Awards and nominations ==
Year	Award	Category	Work nominated	Result
1998	Nigar Awards	Best Actor	Choorian	Won
1999	Nigar Awards	Best Actor	Nikki Jaee Haan	Won
2000	Nigar Awards	Best Actor	Mehndi Waley Hath	Won
2002	Nigar Awards	Best Actor	Yeh Dil Aap Ka Huwa	Won
2010	Pakistan Media Award	Best Actor		Won
2012	Pakistan Media Award	Best Actor	Love Mein Ghum	Won

=== Lux Style Awards ===
Year	Ceremony	Category	Film	Result
2002	1st Lux Style Awards	Best Film Actor	N/A	Nominated
2003	2nd Lux Style Awards	Best Film Actor	Yeh Dil Aap Ka Huwa	Won
2003	2nd Lux Style Awards	Best Film Actor	Kon Banega Crorepati	Nominated
2006	5th Lux Style Awards	Best Film Actor	Koi Tujh Sa Kahan	Won
2006	5th Lux Style Awards	Best TV Actor (Satellite)	Mere Paas Paas	Nominated
2007	6th Lux Style Awards	Best TV Actor (Satellite)	Dil, Diya, Dehleez	Nominated
2012	11th Lux Style Awards	Best TV Actor (Terrestrial)	Aankh Salamat Andhe Log	Nominated

== See also ==
- List of Lollywood actors
