= Sultan Rana =

Pakistani cricketer

Cricket information
- Batting: Right-handed
- Bowling: Right-arm offbreak

Career statistics
Competition	First-class	List A
Matches	172	32
Runs scored	7,128	578
Batting average	29.45	26.27
100s/50s	10/33	0/4
Top score	144	142*
Balls bowled	1,501	370
Wickets	19	15
Bowling average	32.57	15.13
5 wickets in innings	1	0
10 wickets in match	0	0
Best bowling	6/33	3/15
Catches/stumpings	227/1	23/0
- Source: CricketArchive, 13 June 2022

Sultan Rana (Urdu: سُلطان رانا), (born 3 November 1951) is a Pakistani former first-class cricketer. One of his brothers, Shakoor Rana, was an international cricket umpire while two of his other brothers, Shafqat and Azmat Rana played Test cricket for Pakistan.
