= List of Urdu songs recorded by Shreya Ghoshal =

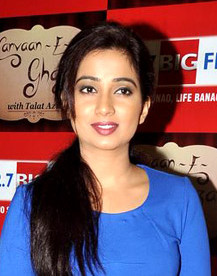
Ghoshal at "Carvaan-E-Ghazal" celebrations

Shreya Ghoshal (born 12 March 1984) is an Indian playback singer. She sings in Hindi, Tamil, Telugu, Malayalam, Kannada, Marathi, Gujarati, Bengali, Assamese, Nepali, Oriya, Bhojpuri, Punjabi, Urdu and Tulu languages. Ghoshal's career began when she won the Sa Re Ga Ma Pa contest as an adult. Her Bollywood playback singing career began with Sanjay Leela Bhansali's Devdas, for which she received her first National Film Award for Best Female Playback Singer along with Filmfare Award for Best Female Playback Singer and Filmfare RD Burman Award for New Music Talent. Since then, she has received many other awards. Apart from playback singing, Ghoshal has appeared as a judge on several television reality shows. She performs in musical concerts around the world. She was also honored from the U.S. state of Ohio, where the governor Ted Strickland declared 26 June 2010 as "Shreya Ghoshal Day". In April 2013, she was awarded with the highest honour in London by the selected members of House of Commons of the United Kingdom. In July 2015, John Cranley, the Mayor of the City of Cincinnati also honoured her by proclaiming 24 July 2015 as "Shreya Ghoshal Day of Entertainment and Inspiration" in Cincinnati. She was also featured five times in Forbes list of the top 100 celebrities of India. In 2017, Ghoshal became the first Indian singer to have a wax statute of her in Madame Tussauds Museum, Delhi. She also debuted as producer with her first single Dhadkane Azad Hain.

After a huge success of Devdas album Ghoshal was immediately called by various regional film industries for recording songs in her voice. She sang more than 12 songs in Pakistani (Urdu).

Given below is the list of songs recorded by Shreya Ghoshal in the Urdu language :-

== Film songs ==
=== 2005 ===
Film	Song	Composer(s)	Writer(s)	Co-singer(s)
Koi Tujh Sa Kahaan	"Ye Aankhein Jadu Bari"	Amjad Bobby	Ahmed Aqeel Ruby	
Koi Tujh Sa Kahaan	"Soni Soni Soni"	Amjad Bobby	Ahmed Aqeel Ruby	Alka Yagnik, Udit Narayan
Koi Tujh Sa Kahaan	"Aaja Karle Pyar"	Amjad Bobby	Ahmed Aqeel Ruby	Abhijeet Bhattacharya

=== 2006 ===
Film	Song	Composer(s)	Writer(s)	Co-singer(s)
Tarap	"Ishq Khana Khrab"	Wajid Ali Nashad	Ahmad Anees	Babul Supriyo
Tarap	"Tun Hoon Main Janiaan"	Wajid Ali Nashad	Ahmad Anees	Kumar Sanu

=== 2008 ===
Film	Song	Composer(s)	Writer(s)	Co-singer(s)
Kabhi Pyar Na Karna	"Ek Ladki Bholi Bhali"	Amjad Bobby, Humaira Arshad	—N/a	Babul Supriyo

=== 2011 ===
Film	Song	Composer(s)	Writer(s)	Co-singer(s)
Love Mein Ghum	"Meri Ankhon Mein"	M. Arshad	Khawaja Pervez	
Love Mein Ghum	"Kitni Haseen Hai Zindagi"	Najat Ali	Ahmed Aqeel Ruby	Nijahat Ali

=== 2013 ===
Film	Song	Composer(s)	Writer(s)	Co-singer(s)
Armaan	"Akelay Na Jaana"	Ahmed Rushdi (Recreated by Farrukh Abid, Shoaib Farrukh)	Masroor Anwar	

=== 2016 ===
Film	Song	Composer(s)	Writer(s)	Co-singer(s)
Janaan	"Janaan" (Reprise Version)	Salim–Sulaiman	Fatima Najeeb	

=== 2017 ===
Film	Song	Composer(s)	Writer(s)	Co-singer(s)	Ref.
Half Girlfriend	"Thori Der"			Farhan Saeed	

== Non-film songs ==
=== 2016 ===
Film	Song	Composer(s)	Writer(s)	Co-singer(s)
Habib Ke Nagme	"Mere Dil Mein"	Deepak Pandit	Habib Tanvir (Additional by Jai Krishna Chowdhry)	
Tarang Tea Milk Advertisement	Tarang Hi Tarang Hain			

== See also ==
List of songs recorded by Shreya Ghoshal
