= Love Mein Ghum =

2011 film by Reema Khan

- Theatrical poster
- Directed by: Reema Khan
- Written by: Mohmmad Parvaiz Kaleem
- Screenplay by: Mohmmad Parvaiz Kaleem
- Produced by: Reema Khan
- Starring: Reema Khan; Moammar Rana; Johnny Lever; Jia Ali; Nabeel Khan; Ali Saleem; Nadeem; Araida Corbol
- Cinematography: Waqar Bukhari (C.A.P)
- Edited by: Akiv Ali
- Music by: M. Arshad; Ravi Bal; Najat Ali; Waqar Ali; Huntarz; Arshad Mehmood
- Production company: R.K Production
- Distributed by: LUX Productions
- Release date: 8 July 2011
- Country: Pakistan
- Language: Urdu

Love Mein Ghum (Urdu: لو میں گم; transl. Spellbound in Love, earlier titled Kitni Haseen Hai Zindagi) is a 2011 Pakistani Urdu language romance/musical film, directed and produced by Reema Khan. It stars Moammar Rana, Khan herself, Nabeel Khan and Araida.

The first part of the film was shot in the Azerbaijani city of Baku and the second in Malaysia, making this Khan's second film abroad. Love Mein Ghum was released on 8 July 2011. The film was nominated for the Best Film of the Year 2010 Award at the Pakistan Media Award in 2011.

== Cast ==
- Moammar Rana as Ali
- Reema Khan as Zindagi/Maria Joseph
- Javed Sheikh as Haroon
- Nadeem Baig as Dr. Kanwar
- Ali Saleem
- Nabeel Khan as Wilson
- Araida Corbol
- Afzal Khan (Jaan Rambo)
- Johnny Lever as Sukhia
- Jia Ali as Sheza

=== Special appearances ===
These celebrities made special appearances in the title song "Love Mein Ghum".

- Sara Loren as herself
- Ayesha Omar as herself
- Azfar Rehman as himself
- Resham as herself
- Meera as herself
- Mona Lizza as herself
- Amanat Ali as himself
- Saleem Sheikh as himself
- Mohib Mirza as himself
- Aamina Sheikh as herself
- Humayun Saeed as himself
- Nadia Hussain as herself
- Maria Wasti as herself
- Adnan Malik as himself
- Ayesha Khan as herself

== Production ==
=== Filming ===
The film started shooting in September–October 2008 in Baku, Azerbaijan, while the second part of the film was shot in July 2009 in Malaysia.

=== Budget ===
Reema Khan, the director and producer of the film, claimed at the time of release that Love Mein Ghum is the most expensive film to be made in Lollywood. She said in an interview, "I have not compromised on any aspect of the movie, from music to clothes, and from sets to post production, everything is done without compromises, the best available gadgets were used for the movie production and post-production."

== Release ==
The film was released on 31 August 2011. Initially, the film was to be released on Eid ul-Fitr in 2010, but due to the 2010 floods in Pakistan, the release date was postponed. The movie trailer was released in May 2011, and the movie itself released on Eid ul-Fitr.

=== Box office ===
The film was released along with another local multi-starrer film Bhai Log and Salman Khan's Bodyguard. According to media reports published by Dawn, the film was doing reasonably well at the box office, but not as much as its two competitors though. Outside the old Metropole cinema in Lahore, huge crowds showed up for the premiere of the film. Despite having impressive opening, the film was declared a box office failure, as all these three films were being screened simultaneously at multiplexes, which media suggested was a substantive factor in the film's disappointing box office returns. Talking about the film during an interview in 2016, Reema Khan stated that the film's box office performance shattered her: ''My heart was so broken that only a doctor could fix it.''

=== Critical reception ===
Rafay Mahmood, reviewing the film for The Express Tribune stated ''The film as a whole is under-directed and under-performed with some of the legends of Pakistani cinema being wasted in their roles. Abbas Hussain, also from The Express Tribune Blogs wrote ''In a nutshell, the film is old Lollywood wine in a brand new sleek bottle that has the unique ability to unintentionally entertain in its serious moments while simultaneously irritate to the point of making one's teeth and fists clench.''

== Music ==
Love Mein Ghum's original music is by M. Arshad, Najat Ali, Ravi Bal, Waqar Ali and Huntar and the lyrics are by Khawaja Pervez, Ahmad Aqeel Ruby and Marz. The singers include Ali Zafar, who sang the title song of the film, and Abrar-ul-Haq with "Sohniye – Heeriye", Kailash Kher and Shazia Manzoor for the song "Sohniye Yaadan", composed and produced by Ravi Bal, Sunidhi Chauhan and Hunter's for "Aila Aila", Rahat Fateh Ali Khan and Shaan. Pappu Samrat is the choreographer.

=== Track listing ===
No.	Title	Singer
1	"Sohniye Yaadan"	Kailash Kher, Ravi Bal, Shazia Manzoor.
2	"Soniye Heeriye"	Abrar-ul-Haq, Ravi Bal, Bhinda Aujla.
3	"Ilah Ilah"	Sunidhi Chauhan, Hunterz
4	"Haal Da Mehram"	Rahat Fateh Ali Khan, M Arshad
5	"Jaadu Bhari"	M Arshad, Shaan
6	"Meri Aankhon Main"	Shreya Ghoshal, M Arshad
7	"Kitni Haseen Hai Zindagi"	Shreya Ghoshal, Nijahat Ali.
8	"Love Mein Ghum"	Ali Zafar, Waqar Ali.

== See also ==
- Lists of Pakistani films
- Pakistani films of 2011
- Cinema of Pakistan
