= Noor Bukhari =

Pakistani actress and model

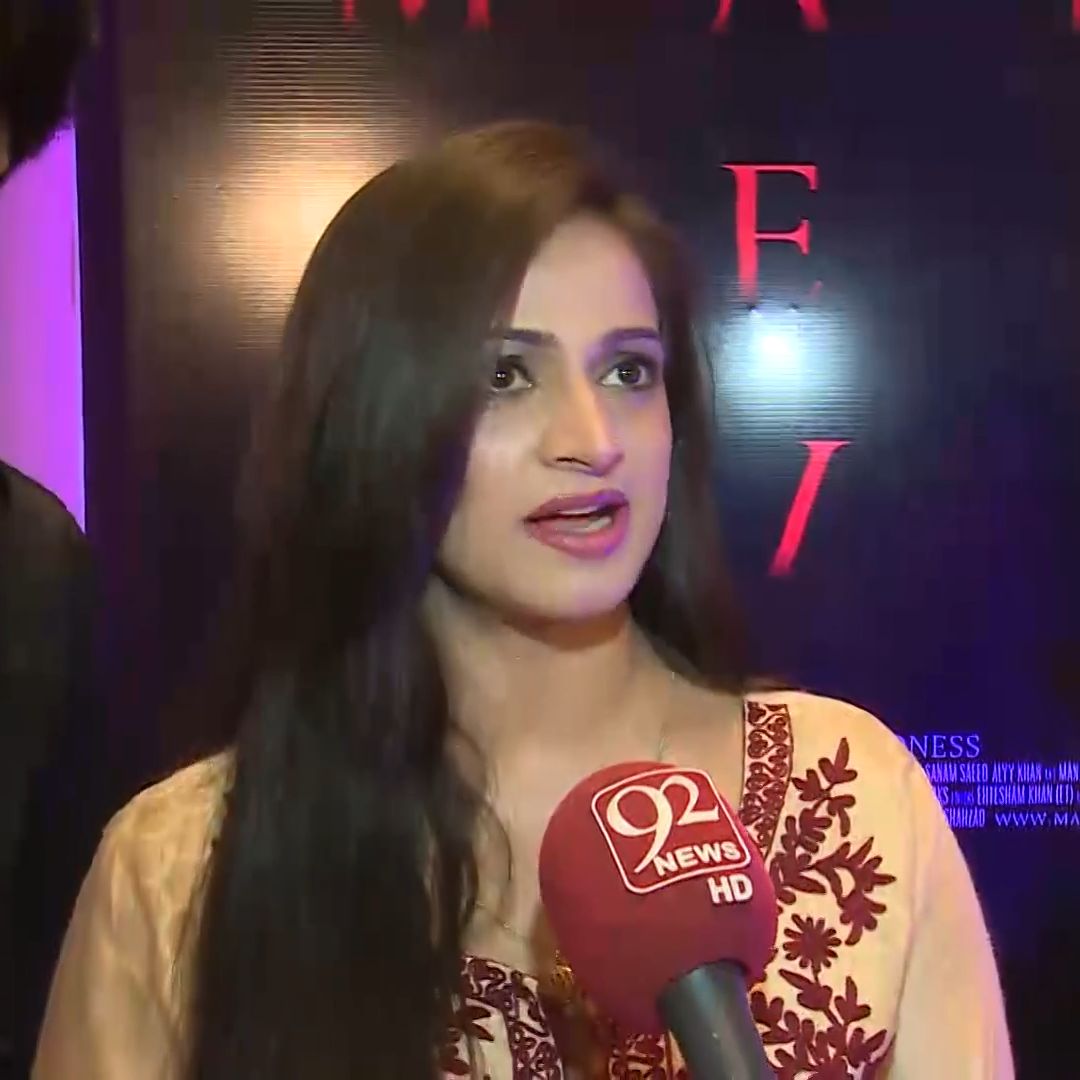
- Bukhari in 2016
- Born: Sara Mughal Bukhari; 3 July 1982 (age 44); Lahore, Punjab, Pakistan
- Occupation: Actress
- Years active: 1992-2017
- Spouses: Vikram Sood (m. 2008; div. 2010) Farooq Mengal (m. 2010; div. 2011) Awn Chawdhary (m. 2012; div. 2013) Abdul Wali Khan (m. 2015; div. 2017) Awn Chawdhary (m. 2020)

Noor Bukhari (Note: Punjabi, Urdu: نُور بُخاری) (born 3 July 1982) is a Pakistani former actress, director, model and television host. She has featured in several TV shows, films and commercials. During her film career, she appeared in 44 Urdu films and 20 Punjabi films.

== Career ==
Noor began acting as a child in Pakistani films in the mid-1990s. She started out with films such as: Pyar karan toh nai darna (1992), Uroosa (1993) and Jannat (1993). Then she started her career as a lead heroine in films like Jan Jan Pakistan (1999), Mujhe Chand Chahye (2000) along with Shaan Shahid, Reema Khan, Javed Sheikh, Babar Ali, and Atiqa Odho.

Then Noor starred in Ghar Kab Ao Gay (2000) with Ahsan Khan, Meera, Shaan Shahid, Jawed Sheikh and Babar Ali. Other films included Aag Ka Darya (2000), Tere Pyar Mein (2000), No Paisa No Problem (2000), Wadaa (2000), Sohni Kuri (2000), Badmash (2001), Moosa Khan (2001), Billi (2001), Sangram (2001), Janwar (2001), Toofan Mail (2001), Kaun Banega Crorpati (2001), Daku (2002), Wehshi Jutt (2002), Ghazi Ilmuddin Shaheed (2002), Dosa (2003), Ultimatum (2004), Zill-e-Shah (2008) along with Shaan Shahid and Saima Noor.

She left the film industry and made a come back with Bhai Log (2011), Revenge Of Worthless (2016), Saya e Khuda e Zuljalal (2016) and her last film is Ishq Positive (2016) with her then spouse Wali Hamid Ali Khan, Saud and Faria Bukhari.

== Personal life ==
Noor was born on 3 July 1974 in Lahore.

In 2008, Bukhari married a Dubai-based Hindu businessman, Vikram Sood. They separated shortly after; she and her father later accused him of attempting to kidnap and convert her to Hinduism. The marriage was dissolved in 2010.

In October 2017, Bukhari stated that she would be retiring from entertainment indefinitely. She remarried her third husband Awn Chawdhary. They have four children together. She is a practicing Muslim who observes hijab.

== Filmography ==
Year	Movie
1992	Pyar Kia To Nai Darna
1993	Uroosa
1993	Jannat
1999	Jaan Jaan Pakistan
2000	Aag Ka Darya
2000	No Paisa No Problem
2000	Wadaa
2000	Mujhe Chand Chahiye
2000	Tere Pyar Mein
2000	Ghar Kab Aao Gay
2000	Billi
2000	Sohni Kuri
2001	Badmash
2001	Musa Khan
2001	Billi
2001	Sangram
2001	Meri Pukar
2001	Hukumat
2001	Ik Din Sher Da
2001	Toofan Mail
2001	Janwar
2001	Kaun Banega Crorpati
2002	Badmash Tay Qanoon
2002	Daku
2002	Wehshi Jutt
2002	Ghazi Ilmudin Shaheed
2003	Dosa
2003	Sooraj Mukhi
2004	Curfew Order
2004	Ultimatum
2005	Sarkar
2006	Mahi Away Ga
2006	Zamin Kay Khuda
2007	Aaj Da Badmash
2007	Wehshi Rajput
2007	Suha Jora
2007	GodFather
2008	Zill-e-Shah
2008	Sasural Gendha Phool
2008	Mahi Sohna
2008	Sarkari Raj
2009	Hakim Arain
2011	Bhai Log
2011	Bazigar
2011	Society Girl
2014	Lafanga
2016	Zindagi Guzaro Hass Kay
2016	Revenge of the Worthless
2016	Ishq Positive
2016	Saya e Khuda e Zuljalal

== Television ==
Telefilms

- Zainaby (2010)
- Oper Ghori Ka Makaan (2015)
- Salman Siddiquie Film (2016)

Drama Serials

- Uff yeh Larkiyan (2001)
- Mein Noor Ka Paristaar Hoon (2002)
- Mere Angnay Mein (2008)
- Phir Tanha (2011)
- Meri Wife ke Liye (2016)
- Ye Junoon (2016)
- Kitni Girihan Baqi hai (2017)

TV Shows

- Pakistan Family Show (2007)
- Colours (2007)
- Un censoered with Noor (2019)
- Nachley (Season 1,2,3&5 )
- Morning With Hum (2010/2011)
- Noor Morning (2012-2013)
- Hum Sab Umeed Se Hain (2013-2015)
- Ramzan A-Plus Transmission (2014)
- City 42 Eid Transmission (2014)
- Tea@5 With Noor (2014)
- Samaa k Mehman (2015)
- Good Morning Zindagi (2014-2015-2016)
- 10th Aniversrey of Hum Masala (2016)
- Jago Pakistan Jago (2016-2017)
- Neo Channel Eid Transmission (2017)
- Samaa Eid Transmission (2017)
- Salam Zindagi as a Judje (2017)
- Good Morning Pakistan along Nida Yasir (2017)
- Samaa Eid Transmission (2018)

Awards

- Hum Telefilm Awards : Best Actress (Popular) for Zainaby (2010)
- Leo Awards : Women Of The Year (2017)
- Sukh Chain Club Awards : Women of The Year (2017)
- Ippa Awards : Best Director ( Nominated ) for Ishq Positive (2017)
- 9th Pakistani Achievement Awards : Legend Award (2017)

== See also ==
- List of Lollywood actors
