= Ghar Kab Aao Gay =

Pakistani film

Ghar Kab Ao Gey
- Directed by: Iqbal Kashmiri
- Produced by: Shehzad Gul
- Starring: Shaan; Saima; Javed Sheikh; Babar Ali; Sana; Meera; Ahsan Khan; Zeeshan; Jia Ali; Noor
- Cinematography: Waqar Bokhari
- Edited by: Aqeel Ali Asghar
- Music by: Amjad Bobby
- Release date: 9 January 2000
- Country: Pakistan
- Language: Urdu

Ghar Kab Ao Gey (Urdu: گھرکب آؤ گے, lit. 'When will you get home?') is a Pakistani Urdu language action film directed by Iqbal Kashmiri. It was released across theaters in Pakistan on Eid al-Fitar, 9 January 2000.

== Plot ==
The film begins with terrorists Prithvi and Charles Sobhraj bombing Karachi. They are Hindu and Jewish extremists. A Pakistani commando team is sent abroad to kill them. The commandos including Shan and Ahsan Khan go to Sobhraj's Island and a Hindu lady Reema helps them. They kill Sobhraj and other terrorists toward the end, and Shan also dies soon after achieving the operation's objective.

== Cast ==
- Shaan as Major
- Saima as Jiya
- Javed Sheikh as Charles Sobraj
- Babar Ali as Oberoi
- Sana as Dr. Nishay
- Meera as Sarah
- Jia Ali as Naseeka
- Ahsan Khan as Captain Amir
- Zeeshan as Captain Ali
- Noor as Amna Ghauri

== Accolades ==
Ceremony	Category	Result
1st Lux Style Awards	Best Film	Nominated

== Music ==
Music of this film was composed by music director Amjad Bobby. A noted Indian choreographer Saroj Khan choreographed songs for this film.
