= Waris Baig =

Pakistani singer

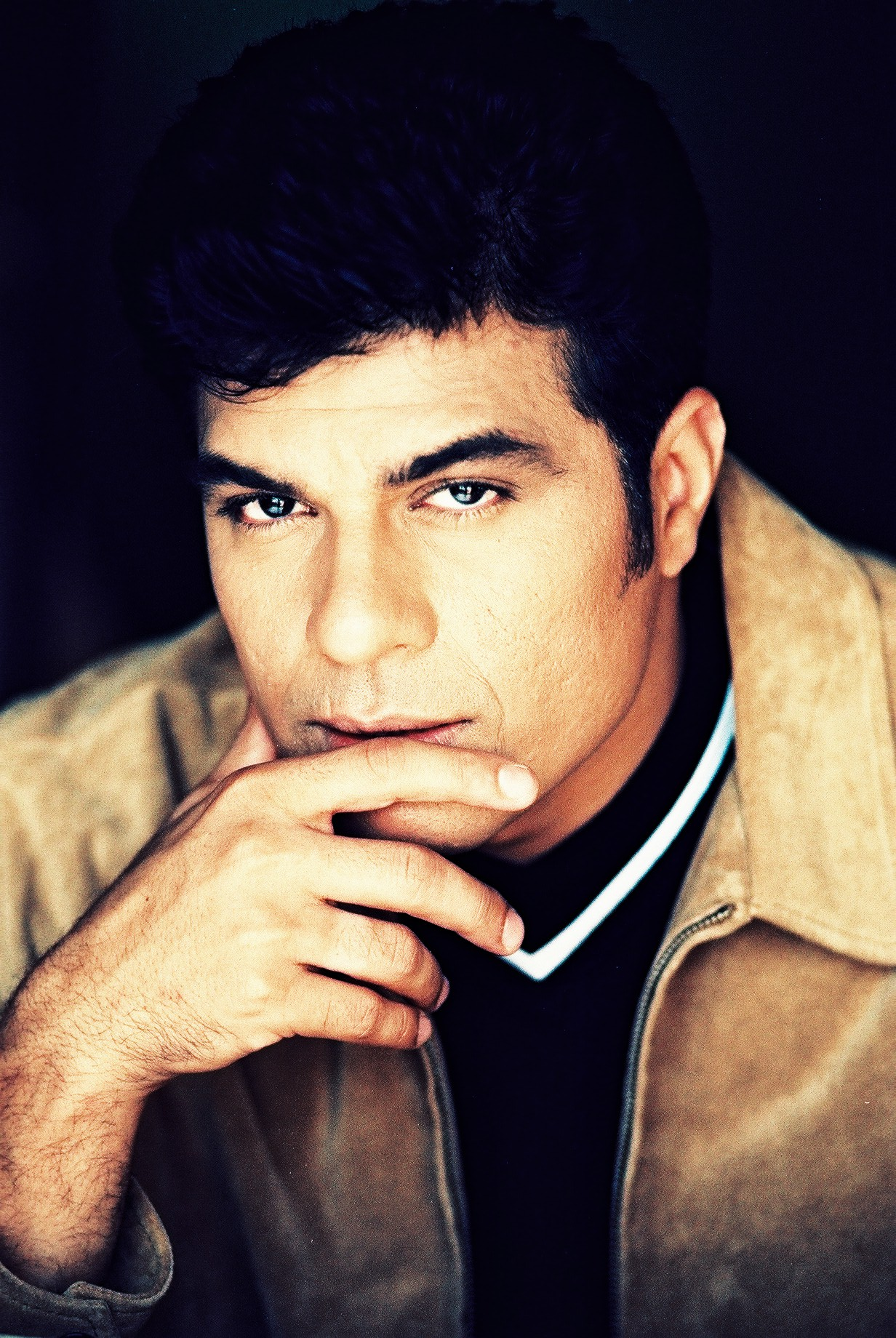
- Waris Baig
- Born: 8 March 1965; Lahore, Punjab, Pakistan
- Occupation(s): Playback Singer; Pop music singer
- Years active: 1989 – present
- Awards: Pride of Performance (2020); Nigar Award (2000)

Waris Baig وارث بیگ (Born 8 March 1965;Punjabi: وارث بیگ) is a Pakistani playback singer known for his work in Lollywood films and his contributions to contemporary Pakistani music.

== Early life and education ==
Baig was born in Lahore and earned his degree in Business Studies from Government College, Lahore.

== Career ==
Baig began his professional singing career in 1989, debuting with the album Music 89. He launched his playback singing in Pakistani cinema in 1997, recording songs such as “Aa Pyar Dil Mein Jaga” for Syed Noor's film Sangam (1997).

He won the Nigar Award for Best Male Playback Singer in 2000.

After a hiatus due to a dearth of quality films, Baig announced his comeback in 2016 with new tracks for director Syed Noor. He stated he waited for a meaningful project and praised Pakistan’s evolving film industry after a ban on Indian films.

In 2024, Baig revealed that filmmaker Mahesh Bhatt had apologized for using one of his songs without permission in Murder (2004), acknowledging the growing importance of intellectual property rights in the digital age.

== Personal life ==
His son Ammar Baig is also a musician.

He released a political anthem "Kharay Hain Hum Maidaan Main" ahead of Nawaz Sharif's return in 2023, showcasing his engagement with socio-political themes.

== Awards and recognition ==
- Pride of Performance Award by the President of Pakistan in 2020.
- Nigar Award for Best Male Singer in Mujhe Chand Chahiye (2000).

== Selected discography ==
=== Studio albums ===
- Dil Mein (2000)
- Aaja Nachley (2004)
- Aas (2011)
- Aap Ke Naam – Islamic Naats (2012)

=== Singles & EPs ===
- Qarz (EP, 1997)
- Dil Youn Tootega (Single, 2016)
- Tery Bina (Single, 2018)

=== Film songs ===
- Suno Suno Bolo Bolo – Chief Sahib (1996)
- Main Ne Tujhe Khoya – Chief Sahib (1996)
- Kal Shab Main Ne Dekha Chand Jharoke Mein – Mujhe Chand Chahiye (2000)

=== Compilation appearances & duets ===
- Pyar Tera Mushkil Se Paya (duet with Shazia Manzoor) – featured on Best Pakistani Duets
- Dil Gaya Dil Gaya (duet with Fariha Pervez) – from Pakistani Romantic Duets
