= Pal Do Pal =

1999 Pakistani film by Shamim Ara

- Directed by: Shamim Ara
- Screenplay by: Pervaiz Kaleem; Mohammad Kamal Pasha
- Produced by: Salman Karim Irfan; Irfan Hussain; Tanvir Fatima Rehman
- Starring: Moammar Rana; Resham; Saud; Meera; Ismail Tara; Nayyar Ejaz; Shafqat Cheema
- Cinematography: Farooq Butt
- Music by: Nusrat Fateh Ali Khan
- Release date: 5 November 1999 (Pakistan)
- Running time: 160 minutes
- Language: Urdu

Pal Do Pal (Urdu: پل دو پل, lit. 'A moment or two') is a 1999 Pakistani romantic action film, which was directed by Shamim Ara.

This film starred Moammar Rana, Resham, Saud, Meera, Ismail Tara, Nayyar Ejaz and Shafqat Cheema in pivotal roles. The film is notable for being the only Pakistani movie to have its music composed by the legendary Nusrat Fateh Ali Khan.

== Plot ==
The film follows the love story of central characters—Gul (Moammar) and Khushboo (Resham) who are deeply in love, but their union faces numerous hurdles. As both belong to different tribes, their families strongly disapprove of their relationship, although Gul's cousin Ayaz (Saud) supports them. Ayaz's mother Muqaddas (Deeba) is actually the paternal aunt of Khushboo, but Khushboo's father Jahangir Khan had broken all relations with her. Jahangir's step-brother Wazir Khan (Nayyar Ejaz) and his son Badshah (Shafqat Cheema) also conspire against Gul and Khushboo, as Badshah wants to capture all the property of Jahangir Khan, and that is possible only if Khushboo agrees to marry him. Will Gul and Khushboo be able to unite?

== Cast ==
- Moammar Rana as Gul
- Resham as Khushboo
- Saud as Ayaz
- Deeba as Muqaddas (Ayaz and Gul's mother)
- Shafqat Cheema as Badshah Khan
- Meera as Ruby
- Nayyar Ejaz as Wazir Khan
- Ghulam Mohiuddin as Mukarram Khan

== Release ==
The film was released on 5 November 1999 across Pakistan.
