= Lahori Gate (TV series) =

Television series

- Genre: comedy drama Sitcom
- Written by: Waseem Abbas
- Directed by: Shahid Aziz
- Country of origin: Pakistan
- Original language: Urdu

Production
- Producer: Syed Shahab

Original release
- Network: PTV Home
- Release: 2007

Lahori Gate (Urdu: لاہوری گیٹ) was a 2007 Pakistani comedy drama serial that aired on PTV Home.

The serial starred Iftikhar Thakur, Sardar Kamal, Naseem Vicky, Abid Kashmiri, Waseem Abbas, Humaira Ali, and Qavi Khan.

Waseem Abbas, son of Pakistan's famous film playback singer late Inayat Hussain Bhatti, also wrote the serial.

Shahid Aziz was the director and Syed Shahab the producer.

== Cast ==
- Iftikhar Thakur as Kukki Pehlwan: A very skinny wrestler from an Urdu-speaking background who runs a traditional local wrestling arena (akhara) in the neighborhood in Lahore.
- Qavi Khan as Nosha Mian (Kukki's father): He owns a Haleem shop.
- Humaira Ali as Kulsoom (Kukki's mother)
- Abid Kashmiri as a Pehlwan (wrestling coach of Kukki)
- Waseem Abbas as a corrupt police inspector and Nosha's friend., also writer of this show
- Sardar Kamal as Khadim Khan: A classical music teacher (Ustad) from a Mirasi background and a tenant of Nosha Mian.
- Naseem Vicky as Mehkoom Khan: Son-in-law of Khadim Khan.
- Ali Sikandar as Faisal: Kukki's brother who believes in Witchcraft.
