= Kursi Aur Qanoon =

- Directed by: Masood Butt
- Produced by: Safdar Malik
- Starring: Shaan; Saima; Nargis; Moammar Rana; Babar Ali
- Music by: M Ashraf
- Release date: 16 July 1999
- Country: Pakistan

Kursi Aur Qanoon is a Pakistani Urdu language film directed by Masood Butt. Film music composer is M Ashraf and film song lyrics are by Saeed Gillani.

== Synopsis ==
The story revolves around an Israeli agent Ameer Khan (Afzaal Ahmed) who, with his daughter Pinki (Reema), are here only to decapitate the country. In the quest of doing so they release Kali (Babar Ali) which causes a mystery to arise. until Police Officer Irman and his partner Naveed must stop plan.

== Cast ==
- Moammar Rana as Naveed Khan
- Shaan as Imran
- Babar Ali as Kali
- Nargis
- Saima Noor as Laila
- Reema as Pinki
- Jan Rambo
- Shafqat Cheema
- Afzaal Ahmed
