= Naseem Vicky =

Pakistani actor, filmmaker, and comedian (born 1970)

- Born: Malik Naseem Waqas; 18 July 1970 (age 56); Faisalabad, Punjab, Pakistan
- Occupations: Actor; Comedian; Director; Producer; Playwright
- Years active: 1991–present
- Spouse: Chandni Naseem

Malik Naseem Waqas (born 18 July 1970), better known by his stage name Naseem Vicky, is a Pakistani theatre, television and film actor, director, producer, playwright and stand-up comedian.

He works in Punjabi dramas as a stand-up comedian and in some comedy shows on news channels in Pakistan.

He has also appeared in comedy shows in India, including Nautanki Ke Super Overs and Comedy Nights Bachao on Colors TV. He also participated in Kapil Sharma's shows Comedy Nights with Kapil and The Kapil Sharma Show.

== Personal life ==
Naseem Vicky was born Malik Naseem Waqas in Faisalabad, Punjab, Pakistan on 18 July 1970. In 2000, he moved to Lahore for his career.

He is married to fellow TV actress Chandni Naseem.

== Career ==
=== Television and film actor ===
He has acted in many television series, including Family Front (1997), a well-known PTV sitcom, and a number of movies.

=== Theatre actor, director, producer and playwright ===
In 2017, he wrote a comedy play based on the Indian movie Dangal (2016), Vicky portraying Aamir Khan's role. A few months later, he wrote and directed a play that parodied Indian movie Baahubali 2 (2017), also playing the main role.

In 2020, he produced and directed a play, also a parody, based on Pakistan's famous drama Meray Paas Tum Ho (2019), where he was the lead actor alongside fellow comedian Qaiser Piya.

== Filmography ==
=== Television serials ===
| Year | Title | Role | Channel |
|---|---|---|---|
| 1996 | Janjaal Pura | Chambeli | PTV |
| 1996 | Zaroorat | Toni | PTV |
| 1997 | Family Front | Khushia | PTV |
| 1998 | Rahain | Falak Sher | PTV |
| 1998 | Home Sweet Home | | PTV |
| 1999 | Aahlna | Ashfaq | PTV |
| 2003 | Dil Lagi | Najmi | PTV |
| 2005 | Chori Chori | | PTV |
| 2007 | Lahori Gate | | PTV |
| 2016–2018 | Choki # 420 | | Aaj Entertainment |
| 2023 | Thana Tick Tock | Mehnga | SAB TV |
| 2023 | Heer Da Hero | Teelli | Geo Entertainment |

=== Television shows ===
| Year | Title | Channel | Country | Note |
|---|---|---|---|---|
| 2007–2015 | Ham Sab Umeed Say Hain | Geo TV | Pakistan | |
| 2012 | Laugh India Laugh | Life OK | India | Stand-up comedy competition in India won by Vicky |
| 2013 | Nautanki Ke Super Overs – The Comedy Theatre | Colors TV | India | |
| 2013–2016 | Comedy Nights with Kapil | Colors TV | India | |
| 2015–2017 | Comedy Nights Bachao | Colors TV | India | |
| 2015 | Eidi Sab Ke Liye | ARY Zindagi | Pakistan | Game show where Vicky participated on 19 June 2015 |
| 2016 | The Kapil Sharma Show | Sony Entertainment Television | India | Participated in the first season only due to the tensions between India and Pakistan |

=== Films ===
Key
| † | Denotes films that have not yet been released |

| Year | Title | Role | Country | Note |
|---|---|---|---|---|
| 2006 | One Two Ka One | | Pakistan | Film debut |
| 2019 | Kaaf Kangana | | Pakistan | |
| 2022 | Maa Da Ladla | Bagga | India | Indian Punjabi debut |
| 2023 | Shotcut | Dogar | Pakistan | |
| 2024 | Rose Rosy Te Gulab | Caller | India | Indian Punjabi (special appearance) |

== Awards and nominations ==
| Year | Award | Category | Result | Title | Ref. |
|---|---|---|---|---|---|
| 2000 | PTV Awards | Best Actor | Won | Family Front | |
