= Hotal =

- Directed by: Khalid Hasan Khan
- Written by: Khalid Hasan Khan
- Starring: Meera; Jasmine Sandlas; Tariq Jamal; Baila Naz; Wiam Dahmani; Anees Raja; Nasreen Jaan
- Production company: OUTFIELD Productions.
- Release dates: December 2014 (Delhi); 13 May 2016 (Pakistan)
- Country: Pakistan
- Language: Urdu
- Box office: Rs 2.9 crore

Hotal, also spelled as Hotel, is a 2014 Pakistani psychological thriller film, written and directed by Khalid Hasan Khan. It is claimed to be Pakistan's first psycho-thriller feature film. It was also tagged as the first Hindi feature film outside Bollywood. The film stars Meera, Humayun Gillani, Sadiq A. Khan, Neha Anil, Tariq Jamal, Baila Naz, Anees Raja, Nisa Jabie, Nasreen Jaan and Wiam Dahmani.

The film was released on 13 May 2016. Upon release, it received overwhelming negative reviews from critics and was a box office failure. The same year, critic Omair Alavi added the film in his list of ''Top Worst Pakistani films of 2016.''

== Plot ==
The story resolves around an Indian girl Kashika (Meera) who is expecting her first child. Kashika's husband Naresh (Humayun Gillani) wants to have a son while Kashika wishes to have a daughter. She stays in a hotel, on the advice of her doctor. There she meets her sister (same mother, different father), who was never born. Mysterious and incredible events took place at the hotel, during which Kashika finds out the truth behind the whole scenario.

== Cast ==
- Meera as Kashika
- Humayun Gillani as Naresh
- Sadiq A. Khan as Dr. Shaam
- Neha Anil
- shazaib Abro
- Anees Raja
- Nisa Jabie
- Nasreen Jaan
- Baila Naz
- Wiam Dahmani (dancer in song ''Lakshmi Hoon Main'')
- Jasmine Sandlas (special appearance in song ''Mombatti'')
- Tariq Jamal
- Muskaan Jay

== Release ==
The film was released on 13 May 2016.

== Reception ==
=== Critical reception ===
Omer Bashir of Dawn.com gave the film 2 out of 5 stars and wrote, ''In the end, while Hotal’s plot failed to connect on any emotional level, it raises important questions about our film industry, the mainly homogenous titles it brings forth and the lack of diversity in roles offered to female leads.''

Tanveer Khadim, blogger of The Express Tribune wrote, ''Hotal, the work of a New York Film Academy graduate, Khalid Hasan Khan, offered nothing surreal and nothing to write home about.'' She concluded her review with upshot, ''All in all, Hotal is a freaky product, not a spine-chilling psycho-thriller.''

Omair Alavi from HIPinPakistan.com also criticized the film's plot and stated, ''Hotal has all the ingredients of a psycho thriller except that the plot is beyond any logic whatsoever.'' He also disliked the film's music and commented, ''One cannot end the movie review without reflecting on the three items numbers – two songs and a dance sequence – that beat even the gandasa-endorsing cinema of the mid ’90s in vulgarity. It’s ironic that the Pakistani censor board didn't chop off these numbers, which were there only to add "colour" to the film.''

In his review on ‘Stupid Six’ Pakistani movies of 2016, Omair Alavi placed the film on second number.

=== Box office ===
It collected Rs 0.7 million in its opening week.

== Accolades ==
The film received an award for Best Film at the 3rd Delhi International Film Festival 2014, whilst Meera won the Best Actress Award.

== See also ==
- List of Pakistani films of 2016
- Cinema of Pakistan
