= Waqar Ahmed (cricketer, born 1947) =

Pakistani cricketer (1947–2016)

Personal information
- Born: 19 December 1947; Lahore, Pakistan
- Died: 23 February 2016 (aged 68); Lahore, Pakistan
- Batting: Right-handed
- Bowling: Right-arm off-spin
- Relatives: Dilawar Hussain (father)

Domestic team information
- Years: Team
- 1964-65 to 1968-69: Punjab University
- 1968–69 to 1972-73: Lahore
- 1972-73: Punjab

Career statistics
Competition	First-class
Matches	33
Runs scored	1705
Batting average	37.88
100s/50s	3/7
Top score	199
Balls bowled	91
Wickets	1
Bowling average	67.00
5 wickets in innings	–
10 wickets in match	–
Best bowling	1/19
Catches/stumpings	18/–
- Source: Cricinfo, 10 September 2014

Waqar Ahmed (19 December 1947 – 23 February 2016) was a Pakistani cricketer who played first-class cricket from 1964 to 1973. He toured England in 1967 with the Pakistan team but did not play Test cricket.

He made his first-class debut for Punjab University in the 1964-65 season, just before his 17th birthday. In his third match he scored 195 against Lahore Reds. He was selected for Pakistan Under-25 in the third and final match against MCC Under-25 in 1966-67 and scored 32 and 10.

At 19, Ahmed was one of the younger players selected to tour England in 1967. He did not play until the fourth match, then scored 47 not out, 50 not out and 29 in his first three innings. He finished the tour with 306 runs in seven matches at an average of 38.25, which put him third in the team's first-class averages. He returned to Pakistan before the end of the tour after the death of his father, the former Indian Test player Dilawar Hussain.

In 1967-68 he made 174 for Punjab University against Lahore Greens, going to the wicket with the score at 6 for 2 and scoring well over half the team total of 316. Next season he made his last century and his highest score, 199 for Lahore against Sargodha, putting on 330 for the fourth wicket with Shafqat Rana.

Ahmed was Secretary of the Pakistan Cricket Board from 1997 to 1999.
