= Ishq Positive =

2016 film by Noor Bukhari

- Theatrical release poster
- Directed by: Noor Bukhari
- Written by: Suraj Baba
- Produced by: Dr Shazia Hussain Dr Kasif Latif
- Starring: Noor Bukhari; Wali Hamid Ali Khan; Saud; Iftikhar Thakur; Shafqat Cheema; Sonu Sood; Faria Bukhari; Durdana Butt; Hina Rizvi
- Edited by: Farhan Neo
- Music by: Wali Hamid Ali Khan, Kamran Akhtar; Saji Ali
- Production companies: KSL Productions; PMI
- Distributed by: Hum Films; Eveready Pictures
- Release date: 22 July 2016 (Pakistan)
- Country: Pakistan
- Language: Urdu
- Box office: Rs 08.0 million

Ishq Positive is a 2016 Pakistani romantic comedy film directed by Noor Bukhari, written by Suraj Baba and produced by Shazia Hussain and Kashif Latif under the production banner of KSL Productions. The film stars Noor Bukhari, Wali Hamid Ali Khan, Saud, Saim Ali, Ahmed Ali, Faria Bukhari, Durdana Butt. The film was scheduled for release on Eid al-Adha 2015 but was delayed and then released on 22 July 2016. At the 4th Hum Awards CEO of Hum Network Limited Duraid Qureshi announced that the film would be released under the Hum Films banner.

== Plot ==
The story revolves around Rajjo (Noor Bukhari) who runs away from her wedding because she did not want to marry Chaudhry Bashir (Saud). Then she meets Wali (Wali Hamid Ali Khan) who was engaged to Saud's sister. Wali convinces Rajjo to go back to Saud so that he can marry his sister. Then they both came back and the wedding preparations start. They soon realize that they love each other.

== Cast ==
- Noor Bukhari as Rajjo
- Wali Hamid Ali Khan as Wali
- Saud as Chaudhry Bashir
- Saim Ali
- Ahmed Ali
- Durdana Butt
- Sheeba Butt
- Kamran Mujahid
- Hina Rizvi as Neelo
- Iftikhar Thakur
- Marium Chaudary
- Maria Ilyas
- Sonu Sood
- Sana Fakhar

== Production ==
=== Marketing ===
The first look of the film was revealed in June 2015. Initially the film was directed by Sangeeta and was scheduled for release on Eid al-Adha 2015 but it was delayed after Sangeeta left the project.

== Soundtrack ==
The soundtrack of the film has been composed by Kamran Akhtar, Wali Hamid ALi Khan and Saji Ali and the lyrics have been given bylyricist A. M. Turaz from India. The music was launched in December 2015 at an event in Royal Palm Golf and Country Club, Lahore .

=== List of tracks ===
| No. | Title | Singer(s) | Length |
|---|---|---|---|
| 1. | "Dil Ka Panchi" | Damia Farooq, Wali Hamid Ali Khan | 04:30 |
| 2. | "Tujhe Bin Mora" | Wali Hamid Ali Khan | 04:00 |
| 3. | "Rab Diyaa Rab Janay – Duet" | Akriti Kakkar, Rahat Fateh Ali Khan | 04:00 |
| 4. | "Rab Diyaa Rab Janay – Solo" | Rahat Fateh Ali Khan | 04:20 |
| 5. | "Ya Ali" | Raga Boyz | 04:10 |
| 6. | "Kina Tenu" | Wali Hamid Ali Khan | 04:00 |
| 7. | "Naughty" | Sana Zulfiqar, Wali Hamid Ali Khan | 03:35 |
| 8. | "Noor E Khuda" | Akriti Kakkar, Wali Hamid Ali Khan | 04:00 |
| 9. | "Tera Nika Jiya" | Akriti Kakkar, Wali Hamid Ali Khan | 03:45 |
| 10. | "Vitamin" | Farah Anwar | 03:25 |

== Release ==
The film managed to collect over PKR 3 to 40 million in two Weeks. Movie cost is 20 million.
