= Saya e Khuda e Zuljalal =

- Directed by: Umair S. Fazli
- Written by: Tauseef Razaque, Inam Qureshi
- Screenplay by: Tauseef Razaque, Inam Qureshi, Ijaz Shahid
- Based on: 1965 Indo-Pakistan war
- Produced by: Jehan Films; AR Productions; Syed Mujtaba Tirmizi
- Starring: Javed Sheikh; Firdous Jamal; Moammar Rana; Rachel Gill; Arbaaz Khan; Sohail Sameer; Kamran Mujahid; Aamir Qureshi; Rambo; Jia Ali; Shafqat Cheema; Asad Malik; Nayyar Ejaz; Naima Khan; Iftikhar Thakur; Noor Bukhari
- Edited by: Farhan Ali Abbasi (Blue Orca Studios)
- Music by: Anthony Soshil (Moon); Irfan Saleem
- Production company: Jehan Films
- Distributed by: Jehan Media Group
- Release date: 16 December 2016 (Pakistan)
- Running time: 110 minutes
- Country: Pakistan
- Language: Urdu

Saya e Khuda e Zuljalal (a.k.a. SKZ, meaning Protection of Magnificent God) is a 2016 Pakistani action thriller war film which explores Pakistan's history, beginning from its Independence in 1947 up to the present day. The film is directed by Umair Fazli & produced by Jehan Films and AR Productions. The film is facilitated by Brig. Syed Mujtaba Tirmizi from the ISPR and is written by Tauseef Razaque and Inam Qureshi. The cast includes Javed Sheikh, Firdous Jamal, Moammar Rana, Rachel Gill, Sohail Sameer, Arbaaz Khan, Kamran Mujahid, Asad Malik, Rambo, Nayyar Ejaz, Shafqat Cheema, Noor Bukhari, Umar Cheema and Nimra Khan in lead roles. An earlier working title for the film was Mission Allah-u-Akbar. The film has been supported by the Inter-Services Public Relations (ISPR) and Pakistan Air Force.

== Synopsis ==
It is a story of Pakistani heroes of the nation during the 1965 war with India, what Pakistan was supposed to be and what it is today. It also takes the audience through a period of history that has been forgotten.

== Cast ==
Actor	Character
* Javed Sheikh	as Hamza
* Firdous Jamal	as Master Rasheed
* Moammar Rana	as SP Haider
* Arbaaz Khan	as Major Shabbir Shareef (Shaheed)
* Sohail Sameer	as Major Faraz
* Kamran Mujahid	as Major Aziz Bhatti (Shaheed)
* Aamir Qureshi	as Inspector Hameed
* Rambo	as Ghulam Haidar
* Shafqat Cheema	as Subedar Sher Muhammad
* Umar Cheema	as Major Jamali
* Asad Malik	as Major Shafqat Baloch
* Nayyar Ejaz	as Molvi Nasser
* Ahsan Murad	as Shankar Das
* Iftikhar Thakur	as Peeran Ditta
* Jia Ali	as Devika Goray
* Jaleel Mirza	as Colonel Ahsan
* Rachel Gill	as Razia Sultana
* Nimra Khan	as Hayya
* Noor Bukhari	as Nayyab
* Naima Khan	as Safia
* Ahsan Najam	as Sub Inspector Ali
* Hassan Khan	as Sameer Roy
* Essa Chaudhary	as Young Haidar
* Mustafa Tauseef	as Young Hamza
* Saleem Albela	as Allah Rakha
* Salman Faisal	as Haroon
* Rida Asim	as Salma Zawar
* Waleed Zaidi	as Sohail Patwari
* Ammad Parvez	as Lance Naik Annas Muhammad
* Mansoor Azam Qazi	as I.G Police M Azam Qazi
* Umer Sultan	as Muhammad Ali Jinnah
* Sasha Pasha	as Young Nayyab
* Wazir-E-Azam	as Gandhi

== Production ==
=== Filming ===
The producer in an Interview with Express Tribune stated that ISPR, had allocated the production budget for the Samjhota Express Scene but they were also kind enough to allow the film crew access to certain locations for Film Shooting. Including a location a kilometer away from the Indian Border for the scene where Shaheed Major Aziz Bhatti's was martyred. The film's Post-production has been done locally in the city of Lahore. The film currently is believed to be the most expensive film made at the moment therefore it took the film crew almost 4 years to produce an official trailer for the film.

=== Special effects ===
The film has extensively used CGI in order to give the film high visual effects value.

== Music ==
A unity Song for the film is sung by former Cricket fast bowler Shoaib Akhtar and two of the film's main cast Kamran Mujahid and Rambo, as well as musicians Irfan Saleem and Asjad.

=== Soundtrack ===
Saya e Khuda e Zuljalal

Soundtrack album by Anthony Soshil
- Released: 2016
- Recorded: 2016
- Genre: Featured film Soundtrack
- Language: Urdu

The complete album was released in November 2016 at Urdu Pin Point.

=== Track listing ===
All music is composed by Anthony Soshil.

No.	Title	Length
1.	"Saya e Khuda e Zuljalal"
2.	"Nashila Nashila"
3.	"Allah Hoo"
4.	"Rabba"
5.	"Thora Thora"

== Release ==
The film was initially due for a late November 2015 release but it had got pushed back almost a year for a Fall 2016 release. After few teaser-trailers (Teaser, Trailer 1, and Trailer 2) the official trailer for the film was released online on 12 August 2016. The film will be released in Fall 2016. Despite the film having an initial release of November 2016, but being delayed again due to production constraints, the film will be released in Pakistan on 16 December 2016.

== List of Cinemas ==
No.	Cinema	Location
1.	Atrium Cinemas	Karachi
2.	Capri Cinema	Karachi
3.	Cinepax-Ocean Mall	Karachi
4.	Cinepax-CityAudio	Karachi
5.	Nueplex Cinemas	Karachi
6.	Universe Cineplex	Karachi
7.	CineMoosh	Hyderabad
8.	Cinepax-Boulevard Mall	Hyderabad
9.	Arena Cinemas	Lahore
10.	Super Cinemas-Royal Palm	Lahore
11.	Cine Gold	Lahore
12.	Cinepax-Fortress Mall	Lahore
13.	Cinepax-Lake City	Lahore
14.	CineStar-Township	Lahore
15.	Cinestar-Xinhua Mall	Lahore
16.	DHA Cinema	Lahore
17.	Grand Luxus Cinemas	Lahore
18.	Gulistan Cinema	Lahore
19.	Imperial Cinemas	Lahore
20	PAF Cinema	Lahore
21	Sozo World Cinemas	Lahore
22.	Super Cinemas-Vague Tower	Lahore
23.	Super Cinemas-Prince/Shabistan	Lahore
24.	Universal Cinemas-Emperium Mall	Lahore
25.	Cinepax Cinemas-Jinnah Park	Rawalpindi
26.	Ciros Cinemas	Rawalpindi
27.	Arena Cinemas	Islamabad
28.	Centaurus Cinplex	Islamabad
29.	CineGoldplex	Islamabad
30.	Islamabad Club	Islamabad
31.	JFC Cineplex, Jacranda Club	Islamabad
32.	Cinepax-Kings Mall	Gujranwala
33.	Prince Cinepax	Gujranwala
34.	The Opera Cinema	Gujranwala
35.	Zinco Cinema	Gujranwala
36.	Cinepax-Nayyar Mall	Gujrat
37.	Super Cinemas	Gujrat
38.	Cine Mehfil	Sialkot
39.	Super Cinemas	Sialkot
40.	Chenab Club	Faisalabad
41.	Cine Nagina	Faisalabad
42.	Cinepax-Hotel One	Faisalabad
43.	Sabina Cinema	Faisalabad
44.	Tajmahal-Multiplex	Faisalabad
45.	Cinestar Cinemas	Multan
46.	Dream land Cinema	Multan
47.	Rex Multiplex	Multan
48.	Universal Cinema	Multan
49.	Shaheen IMGC Cinema	Sargodha

== See also ==
- List of Pakistani films of 2016
