= Ek Second... Jo Zindagi Badal De? =

Ek Second... Jo Zindagi Badal De...
- Theatrical poster
- Directed by: Partho Ghosh
- Written by: Amit Khan
- Produced by: Rachna Sunil Singh; Agastyaa Singh
- Starring: Jackie Shroff; Manisha Koirala; Nikita Anand; Moammar Rana; Rozza Catalona
- Cinematography: Damodar Naidu; Kumud Verma
- Music by: Gulam Khan; Arvinder Singh; Anand Raj Anand; Sawann Donirya
- Release date: 11 June 2010
- Country: India
- Language: Hindi
- Budget: ₹2.75 crore
- Box office: ₹44 lakh

Ek Second ... Jo Zindagi Badal De ... (transl. One second that can change your life) is a 2010 Bollywood drama film, directed by Partho Ghosh featuring veteran Bollywood actors Jackie Shroff and Manisha Koirala in lead roles. The film also stars Pakistani actor, Moammar Rana, Nikita Anand and Rozza Catalona. This film is inspired by the 1998 British-American romantic comedy-drama film Sliding Doors.

The film is Saroj Entertainment Pvt. Ltd.'s first home production.

== Plot ==
There is a proverb that says that whatever is written in one's destiny in some way or another actually happens. But if we fight against it and make the incident happen in a different way, then what? This film follows Rashi (Manisha Koirala), a woman who doesn't know what her destiny has written for her. One day she gets fired from her job and is now ready to leave on the next train, but in that one second that she has to decide whether to take the train or not to, she chooses not to. From then on, the film follows.

== Cast ==
- Jackie Shroff as Yuvraaj Sanghi
- Manisha Koirala as Raashi
- Moammar Rana as Shantanu Roy
- Nikita Anand as Tamanna
- Rozza Catalona as Rozza

== Soundtrack ==
- "Hota Hai Har Faisala Ek Second Mein" - sung by Adnan Sami with female background vocals and English lyrics penned and sung by Shashika Mooruth.
- "Hota Hai Har Faisala Ek Second Mein" - Remix sung by Adnan Sami with female background vocals and English lyrics penned and sung by Shashika Mooruth.
- "Kyon Maang Yeh Khali Hai" — Alka Yagnik and Shaan
- "Roza Roza" – Alisha Chinai and Aadesh Shrivastava
