= Zeeshan =

Zeeshan ذیشان
- Pronunciation: /ziː.ˈʃɑːn/
- Gender: Male

Origin
- Origin: Perso-Arabic
- Meaning: Possessor of Splendor, Moon, Magnificent, Brilliant, Quality
- Region of origin: Asia

Other names
- Related names: Zishan, Zeshan, Zişan, Zeşan, Zeshaan ذیشان ، ذی شان

Zeeshan, Zishan, Zeshaan or Zeshan (Persian: ذیشان, ذی‌شان; Arabic: ذِي شَأن, romanized: ḏī-šaʔn, lit. 'possessor of splendor') is an Arabic given name, simply translated as "princely". This word is also used in Persian, Urdu and sometimes in Turkish poetry as an adjective.

== Variant forms and similar names ==
Zeeshan, name calligraphy in Arabic.

The diminutive or nickname for Zeeshan is "Shaan" or "Shani".

"Jishaan" is a Bihari and Indian cognate for the same word, so written due to the lack of a native /z/ sound in Sanskrit-derived languages.

== Notable people with this name ==
- Mohammad Zeeshan (born 2006), Pakistani cricketer
- Mohammed Zeeshan Ayyub (actor, born 1983), Indian actor
- Zeeshan Abbasi (born 1982), Pakistani blind cricketer
- Zeeshan Ali (born 1970), Indian tennis player
- Zeeshan Ashraf (born 1977), Pakistani hockey player
- Zeeshan Khan (cricketer, born 1976) (born 1976), Pakistani cricketer
- Zeeshan Khan (cricketer, born 1992) (born 1992), Pakistani cricketer
- Zeeshan Maqsood (born 1987), Omani cricketer
- Zeeshan Parwez, Pakistani musician in Sajid & Zeeshan, electronic music duo from Peshawar
- Zeshan "Zesh" Rehman (born 1983), British Pakistani footballer
- Zeeshan Anis Siddiqui, UK citizen apprehended in Pakistan
- Zeeshan Wahla, Canadian politician
- Zeeshan Zameer (born 2002), Pakistani cricketer
