= Husan Ara Kaun =

- Written by: Attiya Dawood
- Directed by: Nain Maniar
- Starring: Meera; Aurangzeb Leghari; Samina Ahmad; Shamil Khan; Bilal Khan
- Country of origin: Pakistan
- Original language: Urdu
- No. of episodes: 23

Production
- Producer: Seema Taher Khan

Original release
- Release: October 2010 – March 2011

Husan Ara Kaun is a Pakistani television serial, written by Attiya Dawood, and produced by Seema Taher Khan. It was the follow-up of Umera Ahmed's mini-series Husna Aur Husan Aara. Meera reprised her role from the previous installment as Husan Ara, a ill-fated tawaif who becames a victim of feudalism.

== Plot ==
In the pursuit of a better life, Husan Ara returns to Multan, after leaving the house of Sufi Saheb from Karachi, and becomes a maid in the haveli of the tyrant feudal Malik Jahandad in Multan, leaving her profession as a tawaif. Her wives Zeenat and Rukhsana, and sister Bakhtawar lead oppressed lives there due to him. In the meantime, Malik Jahadad and one of his rival Zafardad fall for Husan Ara. Taking advantage of her feminine charm and their lewd, she manages to help the oppressed women of the haveli.

== Cast ==
- Meera as Husan Ara
- Aurangzeb Leghari as Malik Jahandad
- Samina Ahmad as Zeenat
- Shamil Khan as Zafardad
- Sarah Gillani as Rukhsana
- Sana Riaz as Bakhtawar
- Bilal Khan as Noor
- Azra Aftab as Hajra

== Production ==
In January 2010, it was reported that Meera is working on a television project.

=== Promotion ===
Meera held a press conference in Karachi before the premiere of the serial, and talked about it revealing that incest and feudalism are some of the themes that the serial will talk about.

== Reception ==
A reviewer from the Dawn panned the serial for the acting performances of Meera, Aurangzeb Leghari, Sarah Gillani, weak and cliché-ridden script, stereotypical characters, and over-the-top direction, though found the performances of Bilal Khan and Shamil as "decent".

=== Awards ===
Year	Awards	Category	Recipient/ nominee	Result	Ref.
2011	2nd Pakistan Media Awards	Best TV Writer	Attiya Dawood	Won	
