= Four Two Ka One =

- Theatrical release poster
- Directed by: Anwer Khan (Associate) Amit Kumar Singh
- Written by: Anwer Khan
- Produced by: Sunil Shah
- Starring: Jimmy Shergill; Rajpal Yadav; Nikita Anand
- Cinematography: Akashdeep (AD)
- Edited by: Prashant Singh Rathore
- Music by: JD Singh
- Production company: Bhumii Creation
- Release date: 10 May 2013
- Country: India
- Language: Hindi

Four Two Ka One is a 2013 Bollywood comedy film directed by Anwer Khan and (Associate) Amit Kumar Singh The film stars Jimmy Shergill, Rajpal Yadav, Nikita Anand, Murli Sharma among many others. The film released on 10 May 2013. Four Two Ka One is produced by Sunil Shah & Nillay Pande under the banner Bhumii Creations.

== Plot ==
This comedy caper revolves around a mystery bag stolen by one of the characters in the film. And what follows is a laughter riot. The movie is directed by debutante Anwer Khan & Ishwar Singh and produced by Sunil Shah. Alog with Jimmy Shergil, Rajpal Yadav, Sushant Singh, Murli Sharma & former Miss India Nikita Anand will be seen in pivotal roles.

== Cast ==
- Jimmy Shergill as Vijay Kumar
- Rajpal Yadav as Rajvir Sharma aka Raja
- Nikita Anand as Pooja Khanna
- Murli Sharma as Chawla
- Sushant Singh as ACP Sushant Singh
- Kurush Deboo as Mallu
- Shrikant Maski as Kallu
- Saurabh Dubey as K. K. Khanna, Pooja's father
- Mushtaq Khan as Taxi driver
- Dinesh Hingoo as Marwari Seth

== Soundtrack ==
Four Two ka One

Soundtrack album by Avishek Majumder and J D Singh
- Genre: Film soundtrack

The album is composed by Avishek Majumder and J D Singh. The songs are written by Kumaar, Parwez Khan, Ashok Upadhyay and Anwer Khan. Musicperk.com rated the album 6/10 quoting "Have a selective approach and you are sure to enjoy".

| No. | Title | Lyrics | Singer(s) | Length |
|---|---|---|---|---|
| 1. | "Om Jai jagdish" | Anwer Khan | Javed Ali |
| 2. | "Sundari" | Parvez Khan | Kunal Ganjawala, Shilpa Rao |
| 3. | "Isshq Di Battiya" | Parvez Khan | Mika Singh, Shilpa Rao |
| 4. | "Bhang Ke Nashe" | Ashok Upadhyay | Kailash Kher, Ritu Pathak |
| 5. | "Give Me A call" | Kumaar | Sunidhi Chauhan |
| 6. | "Kitno ka dil" | Anwer Khan | krishna |
| 7. | "Fina Go Me" | Parvez Khan | Shreya Ghoshal |
| 8. | "Ratoon Zindagi" | Salman Ahmad, Sabir Zafar | Junoon |
