= Ishq Khuda =

2013 film by Shahzad Rafique

- Theatrical release poster
- Directed by: Shehzad Rafique
- Written by: M.Parvaiz Kaleem
- Screenplay by: Saleem Zuberi
- Story by: Saleem Zuberi
- Produced by: Shafquat Chaudhry
- Starring: Shaan Shahid; Ahsan Khan; Meera; Saima; Wiam Dahmani
- Cinematography: Muzamil Shah
- Edited by: Adeel pk
- Music by: Wajahat Attre
- Production company: Sound View Production
- Distributed by: Sound View Production
- Release date: 9 August 2013
- Country: Pakistan
- Language: Punjabi
- Box office: Rs. 2.40 crore (US$86,000)

Ishq Khuda (Punjabi: عشقِ خدا, romanized: Ishq-e-Khuda "love of god") is a 2013 Pakistani Punjabi-language romantic film directed by Shahzad Rafique and produced by Shafquat Chaudhry. It stars Shaan Shahid, Meera, Saima, Ahsan Khan, Humaima Malick, Wiam Dahmani and Shafqat Cheema. The film was released on 9 August 2013 and was declared a commercial success.

== Plot ==
Rulia (Shaan Shahid), a local hood, finds ishq-e-khuda (love of god) after he is "privileged" by the prayer of a Sufi dervish. In a parallel but unconnected arc Ahsan (Ahsan Khan), an engineer from Karachi, falls for Iqra (Meera) in a love triangle with Kulsoom (Wiam Dahmani), Iqra's childhood best friend, in love with for him.

== Production ==
The production of the film started in Mianwali and Khoora, a village in the beautiful Soon Valley.

== Music ==
The soundtrack album was composed by popular music director Wajahat Attray with lyrics written by Riaz ur Rehman Sagar. Rahat Fateh Ali Khan, Shazia Manzoor and Sanam Marvi sang all the songs for the film. A pre recorded song of Abida Parveen was used for the title track.

== Release and reception ==
The film was released on 9 August 2013 across Pakistan with 35 prints. It clashed with Shah Rukh Khan's Chennai Express at the box office and, though successful, was completely crushed by it due to Pakistani cinemas preferring the Bollywood film over it.

== Cast ==
- Shaan Shahid as Rulia
- Meera as Iqra
- Ahsan Khan as Ahsan
- Saima as Malka
- Shafqat Cheema
- Humaima Malick
- Wiam Dahmani as Kulsoom
- Inam Khan
- Zubair Ahmed Kumbher as Train Boy

== Awards ==
- Winner- Abida Parveen-1st ARY Film Award for Best Female Playback Singer.
- Nominated- Sanam Marvi-1st ARY Film Award for Best Female Playback Singer.
- Nominated- -1st ARY Film Award for Best Film.
- Nominated-Shahzad Rafique −1st ARY Film Award for Best Director.
- Nominated-Ahsan Khan −1st ARY Film Award for Best Actor.
- Nominated- Wajahat Attre −1st ARY Film Award for Best Original Music
