= Wiam Dahmani =

Moroccan actress and singer

Wiam Dahmani وئام الدحماني
- Born: 22 August 1983; Rabat, Morocco
- Died: 22 April 2018 (aged 34); Abu Dhabi, UAE
- Education: American University
- Occupations: Actress, model, Presenter, entertainer
- Years active: 2010–2018
- Notable work: Ishq Khuda, Hotal

Wiam Dahmani (Arabic: وئام الدحماني) (born 22 August 1983, Rabat, Morocco; died: 22 April 2018, Abu Dhabi, UAE) was a Moroccan presenter, actress and singer living in the UAE. She had acted in few Pakistani films such as Ishq Khuda, Hijrat, and Hotal.

== Early life ==
She was born on August 22, 1983, in Rabat, Morocco. She was a graduate of the American University of Sharjah in the UAE and held a Bachelor of Science degree in environmental sciences.

== Career ==
She initially worked as a broadcaster on television channel Dubai TV, and then headed to the field of singing and made video clips. In 2010, she also begun working in India. The year 2012, went to the area of representation and after that she participated in the series (Girls) extension actress. She made her Pakistani film debut with Ishq Khuda, which was released in 2013 and was an Average Grosser at Box Office. In 2016, she appeared in two Pakistani films Hijrat and Hotal, credited as "Item Girl". She had also worked as a presenter on Zee Aflam.

== Death ==
She died of a cardiac arrest on 22 April 2018. She was 34 years old at the time of her death. According to media, she was found dead by her mother in her hotel room in Abu Dhabi, and lately buried in the same city.

== Filmography ==
- 2013: Ishq Khuda as Kulsoom
- 2016: Hijrat as Dancer
- 2016: Hotal as Dancer

== Videography ==
- Welcome (Arabic: أهلا وسهلا)
- Sajnawy (Arabic: سجناوي)
- Wow (Arabic: واو)
- What Should I Do (Arabic: وش أسوي)
- Me Or Him (Arabic: أنا ولا هي)
