= Rabi Pirzada =

Pakistani singer, actress, and media personality

- رابی پیرزادہ
- Born: 3 February 1980 (age 46); Quetta, Pakistan
- Occupations: Artist, Calligrapher, NGO
- Years active: 2005–present
- Notable work: Rabi Pirzada Foundation
- Title: Founder and President of Rabi Pirzada Foundation
- Parent: Maj. Mahboob Humayoon (father)
- Website: rabipirzada.net rabipirzadafoundation.org

Rabi Pirzada (Urdu: رابی پیرزادہ), born 3 February 1980, is a Pakistani former pop singer, songwriter, television host, artist and calligrapher.

== Career ==
Pirzada launched her career in 2004. She released her first song "Dahdi Kurree" in 2005. Her other songs were "Mujhe Ishq Hai", "Jadoo", and "Kisi Ke Ho Ke Raho". Her music "Kisi Ke Ho Ke Raho" was composed by the renowned song lyricist Shoaib Mansoor.

She had also started content writing for news websites such as US News Box. She also hosted a weekly television show. Her TV drama production Qissa Kursi Ka was launched in July 2016. She frequently makes guest appearances on Pakistani television comedy and talk shows such as on Dunya News's show Mazaaq Raat. In 2018, Peerzada made her film debut in the film Shor Sharaba in the lead role alongside Meera.

Peerzada has made several projects, including director Shahzad Gujjar's romantic-comedy film Court Marriage, which was announced in late 2017. She is also reported to star in a Hollywood production.

After the death of Khadim Hussain Rizvi, she tweeted that he and his followers had always supported her work of Islamic calligraphy and helping the poor.

In 2017, she criticized Bollywood films and actor Salman Khan, blaming them for promoting crime among the youth.

On 4 November 2019, she left the film industry due to her leaked private pictures and videos. In 2019, she also threatened Indian Prime Minister Narendra Modi with suicide attack and attack from snakes.

== Filmography ==
=== Films ===
Year	Title	Role	Ref.
2018	Shor Sharaba		
TBA	Pyar Ki FIR		
TBA	Court Marriage		

=== Television appearances ===
Year	Title	Role	Channel	Notes
2015	Friendly Opposition	Host
2016	Weekend with Rabi	Host	Channel 92
2016–present	Qissa Kursi Ka	Rabi	PTV Home
2016	Whats'up with Rabi	Host	Capital TV
2018–present	Noor Bibi		Geo Entertainment	As an actress

== Music albums ==
Year	Album
2005	Dahdi Kuree
2006	Mujhe Ishq Hai
2014	Aahat
2016	Chori Chori
2017	Khushi

== Painting career ==
Rabi has been painting since she was eight years old. She is a self-taught artist, but learned art specifics from her friend, the painter J. Arif. She started with calligraphy and continues to do calligraphy of the Quran in various forms, including calligraphy of the complete scripture. Later, she started painting various objects as well as portraits. On the commercial side, she sells her paintings to support orphan children and the needy.

== Philanthropist career ==
The philanthropic career of Rabi Pirzada is characterized by a dedicated commitment to uplifting underprivileged communities through the Rabi Pirzada Foundation. Established in 2019, the foundation focuses on harnessing the inherent talent and abilities of those in need, with a primary emphasis on child education, healthcare services, and targeted assistance to widows, orphans, and the needy.
