= One Two Ka One =

- Directed by: Ronaq Ali رونق علی
- Produced by: Syed Aamir Raza
- Starring: Moammar Rana; Reema; Naseem Vicky; Saima; Babu Bral; Irfan Khoosat; Amanullah Khan; Iftikhar Thakur
- Music by: Wajid Ali Nashad
- Release date: 23 October 2006
- Country: Pakistan
- Language: Urdu

One Two Ka One is a Pakistani Urdu comedy film directed by musician-director Ronaq Ali.

== Cast ==
- Moammar Rana
- Reema
- Nawaz Anjum
- Naseem Vicky
- Saima
- Babu Baral
- Irfan Khoosat
- Amanullah Khan
- Iftikhar Thakur

== Production ==
Shaan was initially given the title role but later it was given to Moammar Rana."
