= Pervez Kalim =

Film director and screenwriter

M. Pervaiz Kaleem
- Born: Ahmed Pervaiz; 14 February 1949 (age 77); Lahore, Punjab, Pakistan
- Occupations: film director and screenwriter
- Writing career
- Years active: 1988 – present
- Notable awards: Nigar Award in 1999 as Best Screenwriter

Pervaiz Kaleem is a Pakistani film screenwriter and a director, based in Lahore.

== Career ==
In 1987, Pervaiz started a movie named Jazbaat as a writer and director, but could not complete it due to production problems. In 1988, Pervaiz signed a movie Bazar-e-Husn as a writer and he became known in the Pakistani film industry. In 1993, Pervaiz and his brother Hamid Ali started a production named Ali Arts Productions. Their first movie under this banner was Gunnah (Sin) which came out in 1993. Their second production was Jaltay Badan (1994). In this film Pervaiz introduced his brother Safeer Ali also known as Aqeel. In 1994, Pervaiz made But Shikken. He feels a film screenwriter should explore subjects with a broad base when writing scripts and the film viewers should interpret these stories with an open mind.

Pervaiz Kaleem is the father of the editor and director Adeel pk, the father and son duo have recently worked together to write scripts in movies such as Mujhe Chand Chahiye (2000), Moosa Khan (2001), Pehla Sajda, Shiddat, Zill-e-Shah (2008) and Bhai Log (2011).

== Awards and recognition ==
- Nigar Award for Best Screenwriter in 1999 for film Jannat Ki Talash.
