= Saud (actor) =

Pakistani actor

- سعود
- Born: Saud Qasmi; 1970 (age 55–56); Karachi, Sindh, Pakistan
- Occupations: Actor; Producer
- Years active: 1993–present
- Spouse: Javeria Saud
- Children: 2 - one daughter named Jannat, one younger son named Ibrahim
- Relatives: Qasim Nanawtawi (great-great-grandfather); Hafiz Muhammad Ahmad (great-grandfather); Zahir Qasmi (father); Shakir Qasmi (uncle); Waheed Zafar Qasmi (uncle)

Saud Qasmi, simply known as Saud, is a Pakistani film, TV actor and TV producer.

Active in the film industry since 1993, he has acted in over 150 films as well numerous television serials.

== Early life and family ==
Saud was born in Karachi, Pakistan. He was one of eleven siblings: nine brothers and two sisters.

He belongs to the Siddiqi family with his roots in the Nanauta town of Uttar Pradesh, India, which has played a role in Islamic scholarship: His great-great-grandfather Muhammad Qasim Nanautawi was one of the co-founders of the influential Deobandi movement, his great-grandfather Hafiz Muhammad Ahmad was a scholar, his father Zahir Qasim was a famous qari and naat khawan known for his work for Radio Pakistan, while his uncles, the late Shakir Qasmi and Waheed Zafar Qasmi, have also been active in these fields. He is himself a hafiz-e-Quran.

In his youth, he studied in the United States, where he learned to play the tabla and engaged in gym-based physical training, including bodybuilding; he also developed an interest in dance, drawing inspiration from Michael Jackson and especially Prabhu Deva, elements that later informed his decision to become an actor.

On 25 December 2006, Saud married TV Actress Javeria Jalil, now known as Javeria Saud. They have a daughter named Jannat born in 2007, and a son named Ibrahim born in 2011.

One of his cousins in India is married to the sister of actor Nawazuddin Siddiqui.

== Career ==
=== Actor ===
He began his acting career in 1993 with the movie Gunah.

=== Producer ===
He's is the co-manager of the family-owned entertainment business JJS Productions which he operates with his wife, Javeria Saud.

== Selected filmography ==
=== Films ===
Year	Film	Note
1993	Gunnah	Debut film
1996	Chor Machaye Shor	
1996	Hawain	
1998	Insaf Ho To Aisa	
1999	Pal Do Pal	
2000	Billi	
2001	Babu	Double role
2002	Fire	
2003	Yeh Wada Raha	
2004	Salakhain	Negative role
2004	Sassi Punno	
2006	Majajan	
2006	Tarap	
2016	Ishq Positive	

=== Television serials ===
Year	Title	Role	Producer	Network
1994	Aitraf	Aamir		PTV
2008–13	Yeh Zindagi Hai	Shirazi	Yes	Geo Entertainment
2009–10	Ishq Ki Inteha	Sharru		Geo Entertainment
2009–11	Yeh Kaisi Mohabbat Hai	No	Yes	Geo Entertainment
2012–14	Jeena Seekha Do Hamein	No	Yes	Geo Entertainment
2012	Pak Villa	Qais	Yes	Geo Entertainment
2017–19	Mohabbat Zindagi Hai	No	Yes	Express Entertainment
2023	Baby Baji	Jamal		ARY Digital
2024	Mohabbat Satrangi	Azeem		Green Entertainment
2024	Mohabbat Aur Mehangai	Mashood	Yes	Green Entertainment

== See also ==
- List of Lollywood actors
