= Maqsood Rana =

Pakistani cricketer (born 1972)

Personal information
- Born: 1 August 1972 (age 54); Lahore, Pakistan
- Batting: Right-handed
- Bowling: Right-arm fast

International information
- National side: Pakistan
- Only ODI (cap 74): 3 January 1990 v Australia

Career statistics
Competition	ODI
Matches	1
Runs scored	5
Batting average	5.00
100s/50s	0/0
Top score	5
Balls bowled	12
Wickets	0
Bowling average	–
5 wickets in innings	–
10 wickets in match	–
Best bowling	–
Catches/stumpings	0/–
- Source: , 3 May 2022

Maqsood Rana (born 1 August 1972) is a Pakistani former cricketer who played a single One Day International for Pakistan in 1990. He is a son of former Pakistani cricket umpire Shakoor Rana and brother of first-class cricketers Mansoor Rana; Azmat Rana was his uncle.

In February 2021, he began to undertake coaching courses with the Pakistan Cricket Board.
