= Iftikhar Thakur =

Pakistani TV and film actor

Iftikhar Thakur افتخار ٹھاکر
- Born: Iftikhar Ahmed; 1 April 1958 (age 68); Mian Channu, Khanewal District, Punjab, Pakistan
- Other name: Kukki
- Occupations: Actor; Comedian; Director; Host; Philanthropist
- Children: 4
- Awards: Pride of Performance by the President of Pakistan (2019)

Comedy career
- Medium: Stand-up; Stage; Film; Television
- Genres: Observational comedy; Physical comedy; Surreal humor; Character comedy; Satire; Slapstick
- Subjects: Everyday life; Popular culture; Politics; Celebrities

Iftikhar Thakur (Urdu, Punjabi: افتخار ٹھاکر), born Iftikhar Ahmed, is a Pakistani actor, comedian and director. He first gained attention in stage drama for his roles in Punjabi drama and has since starred in numerous stage shows, telefilms, television dramas and films.

One of Thakur's most prominent current roles is on the comedy talk show, where he plays the character of a humorous portrayal of a police officer. Thakur has also directed a play called Roti Khol Dayo, showcasing his talents beyond acting and comedy.

In addition to his work in the entertainment industry, Thakur has also been involved in various philanthropic initiatives in Pakistan. He has helped raise funds for healthcare and education projects and has been recognized for his efforts to give back to his community.

Thakur's contributions to the entertainment industry have earned him a significant following and made him a household name in Pakistan. His appearances as an actor and comedian, combined with his philanthropic endeavors, have made him a popular figure in the country.

== Early life and education ==
Thakur was born in Mian Channu, Punjab, Pakistan on April 1, 1958.

He did his matriculation from Karachi and graduation from Islamabad and later studied at the New York Film Academy, being encouraged to join the institution by the late actor Qavi Khan.

Before joining theatre, Thakur did different jobs, including working in the police, driving 16-wheeler trucks in New York and running a small tyre shop.

== Career ==
Thakur started his career from Pakistan's theatre and adopted the name Iftikhar Thakur based on a character he played in stage dramas.

== Controversies ==
=== Petition against Indian films ===
In September 2015, Thakur protested India's 28 August cease-fire violation, by filing a court petition to permanently ban Indian films from Pakistani cinemas. The petition was dismissed, with the court explaining that the Ministry of Culture would be the correct agency to petition.

== Filmography ==
=== Television serials ===
| Year | Title | Role | Network |
|---|---|---|---|
| 1991 | Guest House "Chhoti Begum - Bari Begum" | Tootti Pehlwan | PTV Home |
| 2004 | Aag | Inayat | PTV Home |
| 2005 | Double Sawari | Roshan | PTV Home |
| 2005 | Nizam | | PTV Home |
| 2006 | Rent A Bhoot | Bijli | PTV Home |
| 2006 | Lagan | | PTV Home |
| 2007 | Lahori Gate | Kukki Pehlwan | PTV Home |
| 2007 | Ullu Baba | Murli | Apna Channel |
| 2010–13 | Love, Life Aur Lahore | | A-Plus |
| 2012 | Larka Karachi Ka Kuri Lahore Di | Neema Gujjar | Express Entertainment |
| 2014 | Khaichal | Jeella | PTV Home |
| 2014–15 | Kis Se Kahoon | Salma's father | PTV Home |
| 2016–18 | Chowki # 420 | | Aaj Entertainment |
| 2017–18 | Nawab Ghar | Nawab | PTV Home |
| 2022 | Chaudhry and Sons | Mukhtar Chaudhry | Geo TV |
| 2023 | Thana Tick Tock | Sasta | SAB TV |

=== Television shows ===
| Year | Title | Role | Network |
|---|---|---|---|
| 2010–13 | Khabarnaak | Himself | Geo News |
| 2011 | Shokhiyaan | Himself | PTV Home |
| 2012–13 | Masti Gate | Host | ARY News |
| 2013–present | Mazaaq Raat | Himself / Fabulous John Ferry / Mian Afzal of Nirgoli | Dunya News |
| 2015–18 | Sawa Teen | Host | Neo TV |
| 2022–present | Show Name | Host | Samaa TV |

=== Films ===
Key
| † | Denotes films that have not yet been released |

| Year | Title | Role(s) | Country |
|---|---|---|---|
| 2004 | Hum Ek Hain | | Pakistan |
| 2006 | Majajan | | Pakistan |
| 2006 | Phapa Aya Pakistan | | Pakistan |
| 2006 | Miki Kharo England | Aftab | Pakistan |
| 2006 | One Two Ka One | | Pakistan |
| 2007 | Main Julian England | Aftab | Pakistan |
| 2008 | Gulabo | | Pakistan |
| 2008 | Anjam | | Pakistan |
| 2009 | Apnay Huwey Paraye | | Pakistan |
| 2010 | Channa Sachi Muchi | | Pakistan |
| 2010 | Wohti Le Kay Jani Aay | Chotay Rana Babar Sahab | Pakistan |
| 2011 | Thakur 420 | Thakur | Pakistan |
| 2011 | Sala Sohra Tay Jawai | | Pakistan |
| 2012 | Wardatiey | | Pakistan |
| 2013 | Dil Paraye Des Main | | Pakistan |
| 2014 | Lafanga | | Pakistan |
| 2015 | Nikammay Putar | | Pakistan |
| 2016 | Sawaal 700 Crore Dollar Ka | Special appearance | Pakistan |
| 2016 | Ishq Positive | | Pakistan |
| 2016 | Zindgi Guzaro Has Kay | | Pakistan |
| 2016 | Lahore Se Aagey | Special appearance | Pakistan |
| 2016 | Gunah Ka Anjam | | Pakistan |
| 2016 | Saya e Khuda e Zuljalal | Peeran Ditta | Pakistan |
| 2017 | Phanay Khan | Phanay Khan | Pakistan |
| 2017 | Geo Sar Utha Kay | Police Officer | Pakistan |
| 2017 | Jora Shagnan Na | | Pakistan |
| 2018 | Jackpot | Cameo | Pakistan |
| 2018 | Kaaf Kangana | | Pakistan |
| 2019 | Tootan Ni Chaan | | Pakistan |
| 2019 | Sala Sahab | | Pakistan |
| 2019 | Chal Mera Putt | Chaudhary Shamsher | India |
| 2020 | Roundabout | Pappu | Pakistan |
| 2020 | Sohnra Sanwal | | Pakistan |
| 2020 | Chal Mera Putt 2 | Chaudhary Shamsher | India |
| 2021 | Chal Mera Putt 3 | Chaudhary Shamsher | India |
| 2021 | Paani Ch Madhaani | | India |
| 2022 | Tere Bajre Di Rakhi | | Pakistan |
| 2022 | Maa Da Ladla | Chacha | India |
| 2023 | Annhi Dea Mazaak Ae | Khaleel, a taxi driver | India |
| 2023 | Super Punjabi | Zaid Gill | Pakistan |
| 2023 | Sidhus of Southall | | India |
| 2024 | Taxali Gate | ASI Saeed | Pakistan |

== Awards and recognition ==
- Pride of Performance Award by the President of Pakistan in 2019
