= Zeeshan Anis Siddiqui =

Pakistani security official

Zeeshan Siddiqui
- Arrested: 15 May 2005; 21 years ago Pakistan; Pakistani security officials
- Released: 6 January 2006; 20 years ago
- Citizenship: United Kingdom
- Detained at: Pakistan
- Status: Reports torture in Pakistani custody, before he was released without charge

Zeeshan Siddiqui is a citizen of the United Kingdom, who was apprehended in Pakistan after he fell under suspicion of being associated with terrorism. Prior to his travel to Pakistan Zeeshan worked for London's Underground—its rapid transit system.

== Pakistani capture ==
Zeeshan was apprehended by Pakistani security officials on 15 May 2005. According to the Daily Times he was arrested when he went to a police station in Peshawar to report the loss of his passport. Zeeshan reports he was tortured by Pakistani security officials, with the knowledge of British security officials. Much of the questioning he underwent was to explore any ties he may have had with British citizens who set off four suicide bombs on the London transit system on 7 July 2005 — about two months after his apprehension.

Zeeshan wasn't charged with any terrorism related offenses. He was charged with not having valid travel documents. These charges were dropped in December 2005 and he was released in January 2006. A Pakistani judge ruled that he should receive corneal surgery, because his beatings had damaged his eyesight.

== Return to the United Kingdom ==
Zeeshan was deported from Pakistan to the United Kingdom when he was released from Pakistani custody on 6 January 2006. Following his return to the United Kingdom, in May 2006, Zeeshan was put under a control order, which restricted his travel, and required him to regularly report in to his local police. His name was originally unpublished.

According to the BBC, following his return he took "a customer service job with a firm with links to Euro-Disney resort in Paris". He sought an amendment to the control order's travel restrictions, because his new job would require training in Paris. When he didn't comply with the terms of his control order he was confined to a mental institution, while waiting for a hearing.

The BBC reported that he entered the mental institution because he started to experience hallucinations and flashbacks, related to his torture.

When the control order was first imposed the press was proscribed from publishing his name, and he was identified only as "AD". The BBC won the right to publish his name and excerpts from his diaries.

== Alleged jihadist associates and alleged jihadist activities ==
Counter-terrorism official have asserted they are concerned that Zeeshan is an acquaintance of Mohammad Sidique Khan and Omar Khyam. Mohammad Sidique Khan was the oldest of four suicide bombers who exploded bombs on London's underground on 7 July 2005. Omar Khyam was charged with leading another faile bomb plot. Counter-terrorism officials allege that he attended a military training camp with the two men.

Counter-terrorism officials allege that he met Abd Al Hadi al-Iraqi, a senior Al Qaida leader.

Zeeshan acknowledges traveling to Pakistan in 2003, but asserts that it was spiritual reasons, and claims he only participated in humanitarian work there.
