= Mujhe Chand Chahiye =

2000 film

- Directed by: Shaan
- Written by: Pervez Kalim
- Produced by: Tanvir Rehman
- Starring: Shaan; Noor; Moammar Rana
- Cinematography: Faisal Bokhari; Waqar Bokhari
- Music by: Raunaq Ali; Sajjad Ali
- Production company: Riaz Shahid Films
- Distributed by: X-one X-Films
- Release date: 17 March 2000
- Country: Pakistan
- Language: Urdu

Mujhe Chand Chahiye (Urdu: مجھے چاند چاہیے transl. I Pine for the Moon) is a 2000 Pakistani Urdu-language romantic film. The film was Shaan's second directorial venture and was a huge success at the box office.

The film's cast included Noor Bukhari, Moammar Rana, Atiqa Odho, Javed Sheikh and Reema. The movie's story revolved around the life of a divorced woman (Atiqa Odho) and her musician son (Shaan) who falls in love with a model (Noor).

== Story summary ==
Mujhe Chand Chahiye is a lighthearted romantic comedy. Razi (Javed Sheikh) secretly marries a second wife Phool. Maima (Atiqa Odho), his first wife, splits up with him when she discovers it, and soon afterwards Maima leaves for Hong Kong, along with their young son, without informing her husband Razi. Years go by and Maima now has raised this son, Zain (Shaan Shahid) in Hong Kong. Zain falls in love with a visiting Pakistani model, Chand (Noor Bukhari) and arrives in Pakistan to secure a job as her music teacher. Chand however happens to be Razi's daughter with his second wife Phool. Imran (Moammar Rana) is also in love with Chand because he is one of her college friends.

== Cast ==
- Shaan as Zain
- Noor as Chand
- Moammar Rana as Imran
- Reema as Zameen
- Javed Sheikh as Razi
- Atiqa Odho as Maima
- Ismail Tara

== Music ==
Mujhe Chand Chahiye

Soundtrack album by various
- Released: 2000
- Genre: Urdu
- Label: Silver Streak
- Producer: Raunaq Ali

Sajjad Ali and his brother Raunaq Ali arranged music for the film and won Nigar Awards for it. Some of this film's better-known tracks include "Kal Shab Main Ne Dekha Chand Jharoke Mein" by Waris Baig which remade as Lamha Lahma from 2006 Hindi film Gangster, "Tujhey Dekha Tau Yoon Laga", "Jaan Bhi De Doon" and the sensational Punjabi track by Abrar-ul-Haq "Waan Kuttiya". The film's music was composed by the Pakistani pop singer Sajjad Ali.

#	Song	Singer(s)
1	"Jaan Bhi Day Doon"	Saima Jehan
2	"Tujhe Dekha To Yun Laga"	Tausif Dar
3	"Pyar Karta Hoon"	Tausif Dar
4	"Pyar Karti Hoon"	Saima Jehan
5	"Waan Kuttiya"	Abrar-ul-Haq
6	"Kal Shab Main Ne Dekha Chand Jharoke Mein"	Waris Baig
7	"Jaan Bhi Day Doon - 2"	Tausif Dar
8	"Aag Si Badan Mein Hai"	Shazia Manzoor
9	"Jaan e Man Jaane Jaan"	Saima Jehan

== Box office ==
The film completed 51 weeks at the main theater and thus crowned as a golden jubilee hit.

== Awards ==
Year	Award	Film	Winner	Result
2000	Nigar Awards Best Film	Mujhe Chand Chahiye	(actual winner film) Tere Pyar Mein	Nominated
2000	Nigar Awards Best director	Mujhe Chand Chahiye	Shaan	Nominated
2000	Nigar Awards Best Supporting Actress	Mujhe Chand Chahiye	Atiqa Odho	Won
2000	Nigar Awards Best Music Director	Mujhe Chand Chahiye	Raunaq Ali and Sajjad Ali	Won
2000	Nigar Awards Best Song Writer	Mujhe Chand Chahiye	Riaz ur Rehman Saghar	Won
2000	Nigar Awards Best cinematographer	Mujhe Chand Chahiye	Waqar Bukhari and Faisal Bukhari	Won
2000	Nigar Awards Best Choreographer	Mujhe Chand Chahiye	Pappu Samrat	Won
2000	Nigar Awards Best Female Playback Singer	Mujhe Chand Chahiye	Saima Jahan	Won
2000	Nigar Awards Best Male Playback Singer	Mujhe Chand Chahiye	Waris Baig	Won
2000	Nigar Awards Best Art Director	Mujhe Chand Chahiye	Tanweer Fatima	Won
2000	Nigar Awards Special award	Mujhe Chand Chahiye	Reema Khan	Won
