= Shafqat Rana =

Pakistani cricketer (born 1943)

Personal information
- Born: 10 August 1943 (age 83); Simla, Punjab, British India
- Batting: Right-handed
- Bowling: Right-arm medium
- Relatives: Azmat Rana (brother); Shakoor Rana (brother); Moammar Rana (son)

International information
- National side: Pakistan
- Test debut (cap 46): 24 October 1964 v Australia
- Last Test: 8 November 1969 v New Zealand

Career statistics
Competition	Tests	First-class
Matches	5	107
Runs scored	221	4947
Batting average	31.57	35.33
100s/50s	0/2	9/25
Top score	95	174
Balls bowled	36	1091
Wickets	1	16
Bowling average	9.00	35.00
5 wickets in innings	0	0
10 wickets in match	0	0
Best bowling	1/2	2/8
Catches/stumpings	5/–	83/–
- Source: Cricinfo, 26 October 2012

Shafqat Rana (Punjabi, Urdu: شفقت رانا, born 10 August 1943) is a Pakistani former cricketer who played in five Test matches from 1964 to 1969.

== Cricket career ==
Shafqat Rana was a right-handed batsman, strong on the drive and cut, who played five Tests in six years. He made his highest Test score of 95 in the second Test against New Zealand in 1969, which was also the highest score by any batsman in the three-Test series. He also made 65 in the third Test.

Rana made his first-class debut in 1959–60, and toured England with the Pakistan Eaglets in 1963. He toured Australia and New Zealand with the Pakistan team in 1964-65, scoring 182 runs at 18.20 and not playing in any of the Tests. He later toured England in 1971, scoring 228 runs at 17.53, also without playing a Test.

He played his last first-class match in 1978–79. His highest score was 174 for Lahore against Sargodha in the Quaid-e-Azam Trophy in 1968-69 at Lahore, when he put on 330 for the fourth wicket with Waqar Ahmed.

== Post-retirement ==
=== Cricket academy ===
After retirement from cricket, Rana founded a cricket academy, now known as Shafqat Rana Club.
