= Mansoor Rana =

Pakistani cricketer (born 1962)

Cricket information
- Batting: Right-handed
- Bowling: Right-arm offbreak

Career statistics
Competition	ODI	FC	LA
Matches	2	205	145
Runs scored	15	12,026	3,270
Batting average	7.50	42.95	30.27
100s/50s	0/0	25/71	0/20
Top score	10	207*	83
Balls bowled	6	1,243	500
Wickets	0	20	13
Bowling average	–	35.75	32.84
5 wickets in innings	0	0	0
10 wickets in match	0	0	0
Best bowling	–	3/31	2/3
Catches/stumpings	0/–	87/–	46/–
- Source: Cricinfo, 6 June 2024

Mansoor Rana (Urdu: منصُور رانا), (born 27 December 1962) is a former Pakistani cricketer who played two One Day Internationals. Despite scoring more than 12,000 runs in first-class cricket, he was unable to break into his country's Test cricket side, due to the presence of Javed Miandad, Salim Malik and others. He is one cricket coach who has won domestic trophies as a coach for Lahore, Zarai Taraqiati Bank Limited. Later, he was appointed as the head coach for Pakistan U-19 cricket team that won the 2006 World Cup in Sri Lanka. Then he coached the Pakistan women's team and led them to their first gold medal at the 2010 Asian Games in China. He is currently serving as the manager of the Pakistan Cricket Team.

Rana is the son of former Pakistani cricket umpire Shakoor Rana and brother of Maqsood Rana. Azmat Rana was his uncle.

He started coaching later in his career, under his coaching Pakistan under19 won the World Cup in 2006 in Sri Lanka. Later, he was appointed as head coach of the Pakistan's Women Team that won the gold medal in the 2010 Asian games. On September 16, 2019, he was announced as team Team Operations, Logistics & Administrative Manager manager of Pakistan men's cricket team.
