= Nayyar Ejaz =

Pakistani film and television actor

- نیر اعجاز
- Born: Nayyar Ejaz; 10 June 1959 (age 67); Quetta, Pakistan
- Occupation: Actor
- Years active: 1984 – present
- Known for: Portraying Kali Das (villain) in Laag and Salman in Dhuwan
- Height: 1.89 m (6 ft 2 in)
- Relatives: Ustad Salamat Ali (elder brother)

Nayyar Ejaz (or Nayyar Ijaz) (Urdu: نیر اعجاز) is a Pakistani film and television actor.

Nayyar has been working in the television industry since the mid-1980s and became a recognized face in the early 1990s.

He is famous for his supporting roles, mainly as villain, portraying Shaikh Jumbail in Dasht (1993), Salman in Dhuwan (1994) and Kali Das in the television serial Laag (1998).

== Early life and education ==
He was born into a Punjabi family hailing from Dharampura, Lahore and has eleven siblings. His father worked for Radio Pakistan and was posted in Quetta, where Nayyar was born. His elder brother is classical musician Ustad Salamat Ali. Another brother, Riaz Nayyar, was an actor, singer and poet who died at a young age of 35.

Before pursuing higher education, Ejaz briefly worked with the federal government in Quetta. He later completed his Master of Arts degree in political science.

== Career ==
Nayyar initially wanted to be a cricketer, and even played at the first-class level, before debuting as an actor in Asghar Nadeem Syed’s first play, Zindagi Jis Ke Naam, in 1984.

In an interview, he recalled that while he was in ninth grade, he portrayed the role of a father in a television serial, with actress Azra Aftab playing his daughter. He noted that the casting was accepted by audiences because he appeared and sounded older than his actual age at the time.

Later, he got recognition for his acting in the early 1990s with Pakistan Television Corporation in many drama serials. He has worked in different films, and is now seen on different channels in various serials. His negative role, as the son of Sardar Nadir Jumbail (played by Noor Muhammad Lashari) in the 1993 drama Dasht, is still praised by fans.

== Filmography ==
=== Television series ===
Year	Title	Role	Channel	Ref(s)
1984	Zindagi Jis Ke Naam		PTV Home	
1984	Chhaon	Nayyar	PTV Home	
1987	Masoom	Inspector	PTV Home	
1988	Madar	Gul Mast	PTV Home	
1988	Bakht Nama	Khalil Khan	PTV Home	
1992	Din	Dewan	PTV Home	
1992	Junoon	Rangga	PTV Home	
1993	Dasht	Shaikh Jumbail	NTM	
1993	Baarish Kay Baad	Qadir Bakhsh	PTV Home	
1994	Dhuwan	Salman	PTV Home	
1994	Lawrence of Thalabia	Baba Yaroo	PTV Home	
1994	Gardbad	Saood	PTV Home	
1996	Janjal Pura	Cheemi Guru	PTV Home	
1998	Laag	Major Kali Das	PTV Home	
1999	Haqeeqat	Lala	PTV Home	
2000	Aan	Ghani (Mehfooz)	PTV Home	
2001	The Castle: Aik Umeed	Munawar Mama	PTV Home	
2004	Shahla Kot	Chaudhary Abdul-Jabbar	PTV Home	
2004	Saiban Sheeshay Ka	Balla	PTV Home	
2006	Gharoor	Basa Chaudhary	PTV Home	
2007	Sarkar Sahab	Mir Alam	ARY TV	
2008	Khuda Gawah		ATV	
2008	Tareekiyan		ARY TV	
2009	Deewangi		ARY TV	
2009	Tanveer Fatima (B.A)	Qadir	Geo TV	
2010	Dil Dubai Sehra		ATV	
2010	Kanpur Say Katas Tak		Indus Vision	
2011	Love, Life aur Lahore	Gulzar Parandi	ATV	
2011	Akbari Asghari		Hum TV	
2011	Sure	Nizami	PTV Home	
2012	Samjhauta Express	Bhatadia	PTV Home	
2015	S.H.E		Geo TV	
2016	Laaj	Sikandar	Hum TV	
2017	Nazr-e-Bad	Prisoner	Hum TV	
2017	Piyari Bittu	Bittu's father	Express Entertainment	
2018	Chat Pata Chowk		BOL Entertainment	
2019	Jinn Ki Aye Gi Baraat	Ghulfam (Jinn)	BOL Entertainment	
2019	Hania	Vohra Sahab	ARY Digital	
2019	Cheekh	Amir	ARY Digital	
2019	Barfi Laddu	Iqbal Halwai	ARY Digital	
2021	Khwaab Nagar Ki Shehzadi	Jamil Khan	ARY Digital	
2022	Team Muhafiz	Rawaka	Geo Entertainment	
2022	Dushman	Ranjha	PTV Home	
2022	Aik Thi Laila	Hafeez	Express Entertainment	
2023	Tumhare Husn Ke Naam	Shahid Malik	Green Entertainment	
2024	Pas E Dewaar	Chaudhry Hashmat	Green Entertainment	
2024	Duniyapur	Zabardast Qasai	Green Entertainment	
2025	Mann Mast Malang	Chacha	Geo Entertainment	
2025	Dayan	Shakeel Ansari	Geo Entertainment	
2025	Ishq Di Chashni	Malik Ameer	Green Entertainment	
2025	Sanwal Yaar Piya	Waheed	Geo Entertainment	
2026	Mirza Ki Heer	Safdar Mirza	ARY Digital	

=== Films ===
Year	Title	Role	Ref.
1997	Chand Girhan		
1999	Mujhe Jeene Do		
2001	Moosa Khan	Thakur	
2003	Laaj		
2004	Salakhain		
2008	Zill-e-Shah	Murad Shah	
2011	Bhai Log	Lacho Khat	
2012	Saltanat	Shaffi	
2014	The System		
2014	Na Maloom Afraad	Samuel (cameo)	
2015	Moor	Talat	
2015	Wrong No.	Gullu Butt	
2016	Sawaal 700 Crore Dollar Ka		
2016	Salute		
2016	Zindagi Kitni Haseen Hai		
2016	Janaan	Ikramullah	
2016	Actor in Law	Lawyer	
2016	Team	Chaudhay Saab (Suspect)	
2016	Rahm		
2016	Saya e Khuda e Zuljalal	Molvi Nasser	
2017	Mehrunisa V Lub U	Marzi	
2017	Na Maloom Afraad 2	Sheikh Sultan Al-Baklawa	
2017	Geo Sar Utha Kay	Chaudhry	
2018	Maan Jao Na		
2018	Teefa in Trouble	Sheikh Sahab	
2019	Wrong No. 2		
2019	Baaji	Chand Kamal	
2019	Ready Steady No	Barey Maulana	
2022	Ishrat Made in China	Principal	
2022	Ghabrana Nahi Hai	Bhai Miyan	
2022	Quaid-e-Azam Zindabad	Rana Kamran	
2022	The Legend of Maula Jatt	Jagoo Natt	
2022	Zarrar	Salman Shah	
2024	Taxali Gate	Abdul Hameed / Meeda	
2026	Mera Lyari	Arif Baloch	
2026	Psycho	Detective Jamshed	

=== Telefilms ===
Year	Title	Role	Channel
2010	Khurchan		ARY Digital
2010	Zainabay	Chacha Feeko	Hum TV
