= Nikita Anand =

Indian actress

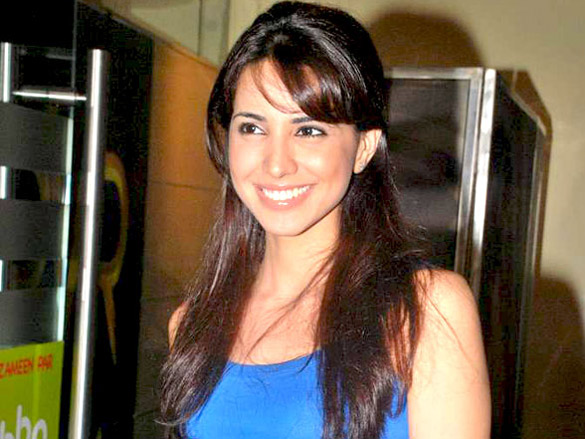
- Nikita Anand at the Indian Premiere of Fast Five
- Born: Nikita Anand; 1983; Jalandhar, Punjab, India
- Occupations: Model, Actress

Nikita Anand is an Indian actress, model, tv host and beauty pageant titleholder who was crowned Miss India Universe 2003. She represented India at Miss Universe 2003 where she was unplaced, ending India's eleven-year streak of consecutive placements in Miss Universe, from 1992 through 2002.

== Early life ==
Nikita was born to a Punjabi family in Jalandhar, Punjab. Her father is Brigadier S. S. Anand, a doctor in the Indian Army; his frequent transfers led to Nikita studying in different schools (St. Mary's Pune, Maharashtra; Bishop Westcott Girls' School, Ranchi, Jharkhand; Cathedral and John Connon, Mumbai; and NIFT, Delhi). She also has a brother.

== Personal life ==
Anand is a collector of watches. "I love watches but very rarely do I find a piece that appeals to my sensibilities. I am always on the look-out for high-end watches. I would love to add more, but it just doesn’t happen very often," she said. Her favourites in her collection are her IWC and Guess watches. Anand also loves shopping destinations Milan, Kuala Lumpur and Dubai. She is now the member of International Women's Film Forum of AAFT.

== Career ==
Anand began participating in beauty pageants at an early stage, and was crowned as Miss Ranchi at the age of 13. She went on a dietary regime when she was in class 10.

While being a second-year student of NIFT Delhi, she won the Femina Miss India contest in 2003. Her final question in the contest was whether she thinks that forgiveness is better said than done, to which she answered "To err is human, to forgive divine, and we have to forgive and move on to make life better." She was crowned by preceding winner Neha Dhupia, and given the chance to represent India at the Miss Universe pageant in Panama City, Panama. However, she failed to place, breaking India's 11-year streak of placing in the Top 10 from 1992 to 2002.

At the Miss Universe contest, her national costume and ethnic dresses were designed by Ritu Kumar, while Ashley Rebello put together her evening gown and western outfits. She was also helped by Dr. Sandesh Mayekar (dental care), Dr. Jamuna Pai (skin care), Bharat and Doris Godambe (hair and make-up), Dr. Anjali Mukherjee (diet), Finesse Shoes, New Delhi (shoes), Sabira Merchant (speech and diction), and IDEA (Integrated Dance Exercise Academy, physical fitness).

After doing stints of modeling for print, walking the ramp, and anchoring shows on fast cars and cricket on television, she debuted in Bollywood in the film Dil Dosti Etc. Her co-star in the movie was Shreyas Talpade and she played the role of Prerna, an outgoing college student. Although the movie received mixed to negative reviews, her performance was appreciated by Taran Adarsh, who went on to say that she has the trappings of a fine actress.

She then signed Ek Second... Jo Zindagi Badal De? and Nileish Malhotra's Monopoly - The Game Of Money where she worked with Manisha Koirala and Zeenat Aman respectively. While the former was released in 2010, and received negative reviews, the latter has been delayed.

== Accomplishments ==
=== Anchoring ===
- Cup Tak on Star News
- Lage Raho India on Star News
- NASCAR on Zee Sports
- Cricket Tri Series in Malaysia

=== Compering ===
- SAARC Car Rally Summit 2007
- Launched Trendz - a fashion channel
- Ford at Auto Expo 2006, in New Delhi
- Launch of ICICI Indian Airlines Platinum MasterCard
- Mahindra & Mahindra
- Ebony
- Idea Cellular

=== TVC commercial ===
- Dabur Vatika

=== Ramp modelling ===
- Modelled for Satyapaul amidst the magnificent and electric interiors of the internationally renowned wax attraction-Madame Tussauds in London in March 2004.
- Radio Mirchi
- Sashayed for Burlingtons in Mumbai.
- Modelled for creations of budding fashion designers at graduation shows of fashion institutes like NIFT, NIFD, JD and IIFT.
- Modelled in shows - 'Passion for Colour' by Times of India, Bridal Asia Show 2003, Femina Bridal Show 2004.
- Worked with leading fashion stalwarts like JJ Vallaya, Ritu Kumar, Mona Pali, Siddharth Tytler.

=== Media work ===
- Sony Erricson
- Maruti Suzuki Zen
- Hero Cycles
- Indian Airlines
- Wills Sports
- Jindal Diamonds
- Rayban

== Filmography ==
Year	Film	Role	Language	Notes
2006	The Curse of King Tut's Tomb	Female student	English	TV movie
2006	The Memsahib	Laxmi	Hindi	
2007	Life Mein Kabhie Kabhiee	Rajeev's girlfriend	Hindi	
2007	Dil Dosti Etc	Prerna Vijay Heerjawahar	Hindi	
2010	Ek Second... Jo Zindagi Badal De?	Tamanna	Hindi	
2013	Four Two Ka One	Pooja	Hindi	

Preceded by Neha Dhupia	Miss India Universe; 2003	Succeeded by Tanushree Dutta
