= Azmat Rana =

Pakistani cricketer (1951–2015)

Personal information
- Born: 3 November 1951; Lahore, Punjab, Pakistan
- Died: 30 May 2015 (aged 63); Lahore, Punjab, Pakistan
- Batting: Left-handed
- Bowling: Right-arm offbreak
- Relatives: Shafqat Rana (brother) Shakoor Rana (brother); Shafqat Rana (brother); Maqsood Rana (nephew); Mansoor Rana (nephew) Moammar Rana (nephew)

International information
- National side: Pakistan
- Only Test (cap 85): 18 March 1980 v Australia
- ODI debut (cap 28): 13 October 1978 v India
- Last ODI: 3 November 1980 v India

Career statistics
Competition	Test	ODI
Matches	1	2
Runs scored	49	42
Batting average	49.00	42.00
100s/50s	0/0	0/0
Top score	49	22*
Catches/stumpings	0/–	0/–
- Source: CricInfo, 4 February 2006

Azmat Rana (Urdu: عظمت رانا), (3 November 1951 – 30 May 2015) was a Pakistani cricketer who played in one Test match and two One Day Internationals in 1980.
