= Shazia Manzoor =

Pakistani musician and singer

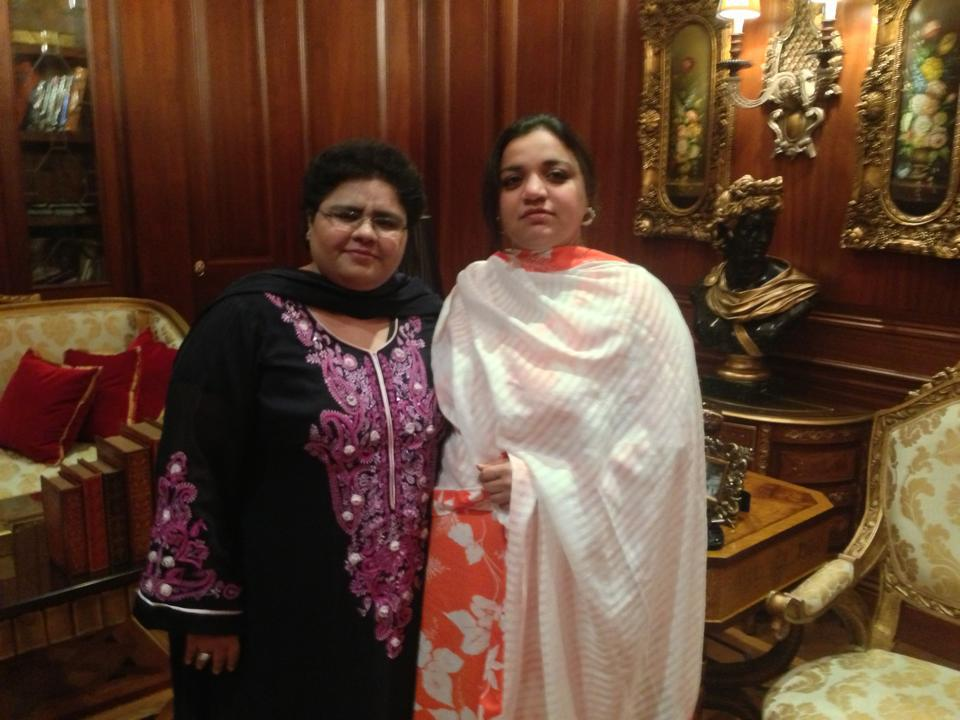
- Born: Rawalpindi, Punjab, Pakistan
- Occupation: Singer
- Years active: 1992 – present
- Known for: Pakistani Punjabi folk songs
- Awards: 2 Nigar Awards in 1996 and 1998

Shazia Manzoor (Punjabi, Urdu: شازیہ منظُور) is a Pakistani playback and folk singer. She is known for her song, "Chann Meray Makhna".

== Early life and career ==
Shazia Manzoor was born in Rawalpindi, Punjab, Pakistan. She first started singing by performing at college shows at Rawalpindi. Shazia Manzoor was trained in music by Ustad Feroz of Gwalior gharana.

She is a popular singer in Pakistan and India; and among the Punjabi diaspora. Shazia Manzoor sings mostly Punjabi music. She sang various Punjabi folk songs and Punjabi Sufi poems. She also sometimes sings Urdu songs.

She is popular for her following songs:

- Aaja Sohniya,
- Mahi Aavega
- Maye Ni Kinnu Akhan
- Chann Mere Makkhna
- Dhol Mahia
- Akh Da Nasha

She has also performed at some charity concerts after the 2010 Pakistan floods to raise funds for the flood victims. Shazia was introduced in 1992 by the popular comedian, Umer Shareef, as she stated in her interview during a tribute to Noor Jehan with Zille Huma.

She was a featured artist for Coke Studio (Pakistan) (Season 8 in 2015). She has performed at the BBC Philharmonic Orchestra in London.

== Selected albums ==
- Raatan Kaaliyan (June 1998)
- Aarfana Kalaam (August 1999)
- Chan mere Makhna (December 2001)
- Hai Dil Jani (September 2003)
- Ishq Sohna (August 2009)
- Tu Badal Gaya (March 2010)
- Jatt London (February 2011)
- Balle Balle (May 2011)
- Sahib teri bandi haan (February 2012)
- Dhokebaaz (Chip Shop) (November 2012)
- Aish Karo (April 2015)
- ’’Akh Da Nasha’’( Shergill Records ) (August 2018)
- Burger & Chips Shop (July 2019)

She performed in Coke Studio season 8, episode 6.

== Duo collaboration ==
- 1999: Dark And Dangerous (With Bally Jagpal)
- 2001: Untruly Yours (With Bally Jagpal)
- 2001: Vix It Up (With DJ Vix)
- 2002: Dark And Direct (With Bally Jagpal)
- 2005: Groundshaker (With Aman Hayer)
- 2009: Collaborations 2 (With Sukshinder Shinda)
- 2014: 12B (With Bally Jagpal)
- 2014: Collaborations 3 (With Sukshinder)
- 2018: Akh Da Nasha (Zakir Amanat)

== Playback singer for films ==
Shazia Manzoor has also done film playback singing for films including Pal Do Pal (1999 film) and Ishq Khuda (2013). Her singing in the 2003 commercially successful film was widely praised by the public.
