= Shakoor Rana =

Pakistani cricketer and umpire

Personal information
- Full name: Shakoor Rana
- Born: 3 April 1936; Amritsar, Punjab, British India
- Died: 9 April 2001 (aged 65); Lahore, Punjab, Pakistan

Umpiring information
- Tests umpired: 18 (1975–1996)
- ODIs umpired: 22 (1977–1996)
- Source: Cricinfo, 9 April 2001

Shakoor Rana (3 April 1936 – 9 April 2001) was a Pakistani cricketer and umpire. He stood in 18 Test matches, including one in 1987, where his public row with England captain Mike Gatting led to the match being disrupted.

His brothers Azmat Rana and Shafqat Rana, and his sons Mansoor Rana and Maqsood Rana played cricket for Pakistan.

== Playing career ==
Shakoor Rana played in 11 first-class matches between 1957 and 1973, accumulating 226 runs and 12 wickets. He was overshadowed by his brothers Shafqat Rana and Azmat Rana who both represented Pakistan at Test level.

== Umpiring career ==
Rana made his international debut as an umpire in 1974 at Lahore, the city that had become his hometown. The match was between Pakistan and the West Indies. His career continued until his last match between Pakistan and New Zealand in 1996, also at Lahore. He stood in 18 test matches and 22 One Day Internationals.

== 1987 Test match in Faisalabad ==
In a Test match in Faisalabad in 1987, Rana and Mike Gatting argued after Rana decided Gatting had made an alteration to the fielding positions as Eddie Hemmings ran in to bowl. Rana accused Gatting of cheating, though in fact, the move was legal as Gatting had been signalling to the long leg fielder to stop walking in, as it was not in the batsman's eyeline, while earlier in the series he had put on a Pakistan shirt during the match.

Rana shouted "Stop,Stop" and called a dead ball, with the ensuing argument stopping the match, and footage of the English cricket captain and the umpire shouting at each other with fingers pointed in each other's faces was widely broadcast. Rana accused Gatting of cheating and both were accused of using foul language, much of which was heard by a worldwide TV audience via the stump microphone. Shakoor refused to stand again in that Test until he received an unconditional apology from Gatting for the language used in the dispute. Gatting was threatened with being stripped of the England captaincy and was forced into issuing a written apology to Rana. Gatting issued a written apology and has since expressed regret at his part in the row.

Rana was due to umpire the third and deciding Test match of the series, however the TCCB informed Pakistan that in those circumstances England would not play the match, so he was replaced.

== See also ==
- List of One Day International cricket umpires
- List of Test cricket umpires
