= Bhai Log =

2011 film by Syed Faisal Bukhari

- Theatrical release poster
- Directed by: Syed Faisal Bukhari
- Written by: Pervaiz Kaleem
- Produced by: Chaudhry Ijaz Kamran
- Starring: Babar Ali; Saima; Shafqat Cheema; Noor Bukhari; Meera; Nadeem Baig; Javed Sheikh; Nayyar Ejaz; Aamir Qureshi
- Music by: M. Arshad and Naveed Wajid Ali Nashad
- Release date: 31 August 2011
- Running time: 150 min
- Country: Pakistan
- Language: Urdu

Bhai Log is a 2011 Pakistani Urdu film directed by Syed Faisal Bukhari, produced by Chaudhry Ijaz Kamran, with dialogues and screenplay by Pervaiz Kaleem.

The cast includes Moammar Rana, Shamoon Abbasi, Saima Noor, Nadeem Baig, Javed Sheikh, Noor, Babrik Shah, Meera, Nayyar Ejaz, Babar Ali, and Shafqat Cheema in lead roles. The music is composed by M. Arshad. The film was released on Eid-ul-Fitr 2011. It was a moderate box office hit.

== Cast ==
Actor	Character
Javed Sheikh	Aslam Bhai
Nadeem Baig	Abba Bhai
Moammar Rana	Raja
Shamoon Abbasi	Inspector Nagra
Babar Ali	Faizu
Shafqat Cheema	Israr David
Saima Noor	Munniya
Noor	Jia
Meera	Sughi
Aamir Qureshi	Nado
Babrik Shah	Hassan
Sila Hussain	Lailla
Aslam Sheikh	Salama
Rashid Chaudry	
Shahzad Ali Khan	Boteya
Nayyar Ejaz	Lachoo

=== Box office ===
The film turned out to be a hit at most single-screen cinemas.
