= Koi Tujh Sa Kahaan =

2005 film

Koi Tujh Sa Kahan
- Directed by: Reema Khan
- Written by: Khalil-ur-Rehman Qamar
- Produced by: Reema Khan
- Starring: Reema Khan; Moammar Rana; Nadeem; Veena Malik; Babrak Shah; Irfan Khoosat
- Cinematography: Waqar Bokhari
- Edited by: Akiv Ali; Aqeel Ali Asghar
- Music by: Amjad Bobby; Wajid Ali Nashad
- Release date: 12 August 2005
- Running time: 163 minutes
- Country: Pakistan
- Language: Urdu

Koi Tujh Sa Kahan (Urdu: کوئی تجھ سا کہاں, lit. 'There's no one like you') is a 2005 Pakistani Urdu film, directed by Reema which was released in theaters across Pakistan and UK on 12 August 2005.

== Cast ==
- Reema Khan - Bella
- Moammar Rana - Peeru
- Veena Malik - Beena
- Nadeem Baig - Sir Romeo
- Irfan Khoosat - Boota Singh
- Babrak Shah - Zaviar
- Simran - Sarah

== Plot ==
Koi Tujh Sa Kahan is a movie whose story revolves around a loving couple Peeru (Moammar Rana) and Bella (Reema Khan).

The story starts with Bella who has traveled all the way to Singapore to lead the naming ceremony of Peeru Hotel, which is owned by her group named Surkhab Group of Companies, as a token of gift to her husband on his birthday. There she also narrated the success story of her husband (Peeru), who has risen from a waiter to be the MD of the group. Given all that, both are enjoying a happy life after marriage which is full of love and passion.

Despite a very affectionate relationship between the husband and wife, Peeru's secretary named Beena (Veena Malik) is shown taking keen interest in Peeru and trying to make illegitimate advances towards Peeru many times. Finally, Beena was successful at inviting Peeru to her home on her birthday party, and Peeru fell for the trap as Peeru was the only invitee for the night. However, before Beena can take advantage of the night and wine, Bella, on the advice of her close but very skeptical friend, Sarah (Simran), intervened on time before any mishap takes place. Although it was not the first time that Sarah (Simran) was seen taking a keen interest in the affairs of Peeru and Bella, while her detest for Beena was also not new. However, the event was enough to shake the trust and affection for Peeru in Bella's heart.

The above event was soon followed by a call from Beena to Bella, which was full of infuriating utterances by Beena, that made Bella leave her house in anger. Soon Bella was at Beena's home, and her pistol pointed towards Beena. Suddenly, there were bangs of gun shots, and Beena was dead, while Bella kept denying that she fired any of the shots.

On the advice of Peeru (Moammar Rana), Bella (Reema Khan) plans to leave for Singapore in order to hide from the police. However, in the last moments, she changes her plan and goes on to stay in Malaysia with her uncle SIR ROMEO (Nadeem Baig), without keeping her husband informed of this. Thus, with an intention to let her husband know about her change of plans, Bella calls to Peeru (Moammar Rana) only, to overhear her friend Sarah and her husband Peeru's romantic gossip. Feeling completely with broken trust, she had a mild nervous breakdown which she soon comes out of.

In the meantime, it becomes clear that Peeru and Sarah, planned this all along for lust, revenge, money and property. While Bella being supported by her faithful driver Butta Singh (Irfan Khoosat) and her uncle Romeo, recovers once again. Soon Butta Singh discloses the fact that it was he who fired the shots that day out of love and faithfulness for his master's degree and that he will take the responsibility of the murder when the right time comes.

Now aware of the true intentions of her husband, Bella takes back the "Power of Attorney" from Peeru, who once again becomes penniless. Uncle Romeo meets with Sarah and talks Sarah into killing Peeru for 10 million dollars on his birthday. The offer was accepted by Sarah.

Finally, on Peeru's birthday, Bella (Reema Khan) reveals the real story to all the invited guests, while on the other side, Sarah points her gun towards Peeru. However, a shot from behind by Sarah's boyfriend Zaviar (Babrak Shah) on the pretext of getting cheated by him, ends her life. However, in the meantime, Peeru realizes his mistakes and apologizes to Bella, who after some thinking, forgives him. Thus the movie ends on a happy note.

== Accolades ==
Ceremony	Category	Recipient	Result
5th Lux Style Awards	Best Film	Reema Khan	Won
5th Lux Style Awards	Best Film Actor	Moammar Rana	Won
5th Lux Style Awards	Best Film Actress	Reema Khan	Won

== Soundtrack ==
The Soundtrack of the movie Koi Tujh Sa Kahan is composed by Amjad Bobby & Wajid Ali Nashad. Title Track "Koi Tujh Sa Kahan" sung By Udit Narayan & Alka Yagnik Second hit song is "Waada Hai Mera". It is also sung by Udit Narayan & Alka Yagnik. All Tracks of this movie are recorded by Bollywood singers excluding "Ek Bewafa Ne" because that is sung by Pakistani film playback singer Naseebo Lal.

Song	Singer
"Koi Tujh Sa Kahan (Title Song)"	Udit Narayan & Alka Yagnik
"Sohni Sohni Sohni"	Udit Narayan, Shreya Ghoshal & Alka Yagnik
"Meri Aankhain"	Shreya Ghoshal
"Aaja Karle Pyar"	Abhijeet & Shreya Ghoshal
"Ek Bewafa Ne"	Naseebo Lal
"Wada Hai Mera"	Udit Narayan & Alka Yagnik
"Pyar Mein Kis Ne"	Alka Yagnik

== Film business ==
This film was a hit at the box office.

== Filming locations ==
- Bangkok, Thailand
- Kuala Lumpur, Malaysia
- Singapore
