= Meera (Pakistani actress) =

Pakistani actress (born 1956)

- میرا
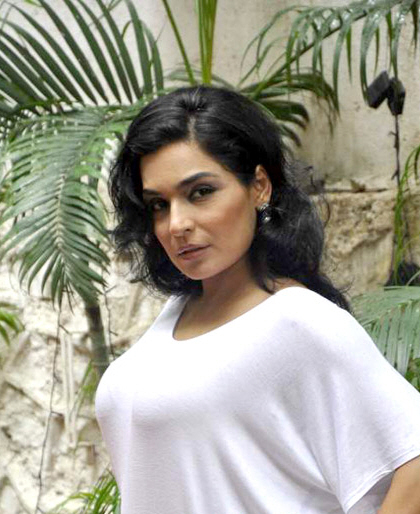
- Meera in 2013
- Born: Irtiza Rubab
- Occupation: Actress
- Years active: 1995–present
- Spouses: Sheikh Attiqueur Rahman (m. 2007, divorced) Naveed Pervaiz (m. 2013)
- Awards: Pakistan Media Award; Nigar Awards; Pride of Performance Award from the Government of Pakistan

Irtiza Rubab (Urdu: ارتضی رباب), better known by her stage name Meera (Urdu: میرا), is a Pakistani film actress and television presenter. She has appeared in Urdu, Punjabi and Hindi movies.

== Career ==
In 2008, she played a lead role in the Lollywood film Salakhain. In 2005, she acted in a joint Indo-Pakistani film, Nazar with which she debuted in Bollywood. Her kissing scenes with co-star Ashmit Patel, an Indian Hindu actor, led to much outrage and denunciation among conservative Muslim clerics of Pakistan. Patel's visa application was rejected by Pakistani government, while Meera was threatened with bombing of her press conference and ban from films. She later called it a "baseless controversy", defending herself citing freedom of expression.

In 2010, she played the titular role of Husan Ara in TV One's Husan Ara Kaun, followed by another role in A-Plus TV's drama Bichday Toh Ahsaas Hua in next year. In 2014, she was honoured with Best Actress Award at 3rd Delhi International Film Festival, for her ''out of the box'' performance in psychological thriller film Hotal. In 2016, she announced her first project as a director, which was titled Oscar. The same year she played a role of Naseem Dilruba for TV One in the drama Mein Sitara, which was nominated for Lux Style Awards. In addition, she played a character in the television series Naagin. She appeared as a film star in the 2019 drama film Baaji, which proved to be a box office success.

She has announced to enter politics and that she will join Pakistan Tehreek-e-Insaaf (PTI), the party in power in Pakistan.

=== Bollywood career ===
Meera did her first movie in India, named Nazar which had her as the first Pakistani actress to be seen in India like Begum Para, as well as it was the beginning of the India Pakistan peace talks. Nazar was a film directed by Soni Razdan and it was the first Indo-Pakistani joint movie venture in 50 years. Her second movie was Kasak starring Lucky Ali. Although Kasak failed critically and commercially, Meera still kept working in Bollywood. Her third film Paanch Ghantey Mien Paanch Crore was an average grosser at the box office. The film was not screened for press and critics as the director Faisal Saif wanted to show the film directly to the audience. The film managed a decent opening of 50% with its limited cinema release. However, The Times of India listed the film in Bollywood's Top 10 Bold Films category of 2012.

== Personal life ==
In 2009, a Faisalabad-based businessman Sheikh Attiq-ur-Rehman claimed that he and Meera were married in 2007. Meera denied that marriage and filed a case against him for making a false claim. But in 2018, a Lahore family court declared Meera to be the wife of Attiq-ur-Rehman by validating the marriage certificate and honeymoon pictures.

In 2011, Meera accused Bollywood director Mahesh Bhatt of physically abusing her while she was filming Nazar in 2005, and also claimed that she had been in a romantic relationship with him. Bhatt and his wife Soni Razdan denied the allegations, threatening her with legal action on charges of defamation.

== Filmography ==
- All films are in Pakistani Urdu-Punjabi language, unless otherwise noted.

Year	Film	Role	Notes	Ref.
1996	Chief Sahib			
1999	Guns and Roses			
1999	Inteha	Sara		
1999	Mujhay Jeenay do			
1999	Pal Do Pal	Ruby		
2000	Ghar Kab Aao Gay	Sarah		
2000	Billi	Lawyer		
2001	Khoey Ho Tum Kahan			
2002	Chalo Ishq Larain			
2002	Fire			
2003	Pyar Hi Pyar Mein			
2004	Salakhain			
2005	Nazar		DebutHindi film	
2005	Kasak		Hindi film	
2007	Godfather			
2008	Khulay Aasman Ke Neechay			
2011	Son of Pakistan			
2011	Bhai Log			
2011	Love Mein Ghum			
2012	Paanch Ghantey Mien Paanch Crore	Sonia	Hindi film	
2013	Ishq Khuda			
2013	Bhadaas		Hindi film	
2015	Bumper Draw		Hindi film	
2015	Dunno Y2... Life Is a Moment		Hindi-English bilingual film	
2016	Salute			
2016	Hotal			
2016	Jab Tak Hain Hum			
2017	Islamic Exorcist	Natasha Chuodury	English film	
2017	Sheitaan	Natasha Chuodury	Hindi film	
2018	Aks			
2018	Wujood			
2018	Shor Sharaba			
2018	Jackpot			
2019	Baaji			
2019	Parey Hut Love			
2023	Allahyar and the 100 Flowers of God			
2026	Psycho			
TBA	Chaa Jaa Re			
TBA	Oscar		Urdu-English bilingual film	

== Television ==
Year	Tiltle	Network
2016	Mein Sitara	TV One
2017	Naagin	Geo Kahani
2026	Tamasha Season 5	Ary Digital

== Awards and recognition ==
Ceremony	Category	Film	Result
1st Lux Style Awards	Best Film Actress	N/A	Nominated
2nd Lux Style Awards	Best Film Actress	Raqqasa	Nominated
3rd Lux Style Awards	Best Film Actress	Commando	Nominated
19th Lux Style Awards	Best Film Actress	Baaji	Nominated
1st Pakistan Media Awards	Best Film Heroine	N/A	Won
2nd Pakistan Media Awards	Best TV Actress	Husan Ara Koun	Nominated
Government of Pakistan	Pride of Performance	N/A	Won

== See also ==
- List of Pakistani actresses
- Veena Malik
- Mathira
- Rabi Pirzada
