= Reema Khan =

Pakistani actress and director

- ریما خان
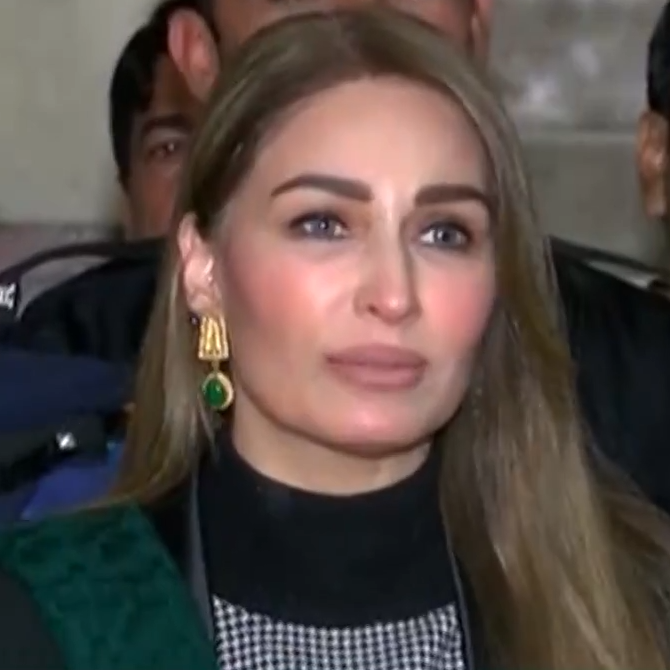
- Khan in 2019
- Born: Sameena Khan ثمینہ خان; 27 October 1971 (age 54); Lahore, Punjab, Pakistan
- Citizenship: Pakistani
- Occupations: dancer; Film actress; Film producer; TV host; Film director
- Years active: 1985 - present
- Spouse: S. Tariq Shahab (m. 2011)
- Children: Ali Shahab
- Awards: Pride of Performance by the President of Pakistan (2019)
- Website: www.reemakhan.info

Reema Khan (Urdu: ریما خان) born Sameena Khan (Urdu: ثمینہ خان), known mononymously as Reema, is a Pakistani television host and former stage dancer, Lollywood film actress, director, and producer. Khan was one of the leading film actresses in Pakistan during the 1990s. She has appeared in more than 200 films since making her debut in 1990 and has been recognised by Pakistan film critics for her acting. She received the Pride of Performance Award in 2019 for her contributions to Pakistani cinema.

== Early life and career ==
Reema was born as Sameena Khan in Lahore on 27 October 1971 to a Qizilbash family.Reema’s father is a former gazette officer who then later became a lawyer.Her mother was a dancer.She initially received her education from Convent School in Multan, later moving to Lahore again to continue her higher studies. Reema was interested in acting from a young age. She studied dance and performed in a theater troupe as a child star.In 1985, she appeared as a child actress in the film Qismat. She was first spotted in 1990 by the Pakistani film director Javed Fazil, who offered her the leading role in his film Bulandi.

== Personal life ==
Reema Khan married Pakistani-American cardiologist Tariq Shahab in November 2011. On 24 March 2015, Khan gave birth to her first son. A picture she shared on the social media in August 2024 with a baby led to speculation that the couple had welcomed a second child.

== Awards and recognition ==
Year	Award	Category	Result	Title	Ref.
1993	Nigar Award	Best Actress	Won	Haathi Mere Saathi	
1998	Nigar Award	Best Actress	Won	Nikah	
2000	Nigar Award	Special Awards	Won	Mujhe Chand Chahiye	
2004	Lux Style Awards	Best TV Actress (Satellite)	Won	Yaad To Ayengye	
2005	Lux Style Awards	Best Film	Won	Koi Tujh Sa Kahan	
2005	Lux Style Awards	Best Film Actress	Won	Koi Tujh Sa Kahan	
2014	AAM Partner Award	America Abroad Media Award	Won	Reema Khan's America	
2019	Pride of Performance	Award by the President of Pakistan	Won	Herself	
2023	Lux Style Awards	The Youngest Lifetime Achievement Award	Won	Contribution to Media Industry	

== See also ==
- List of Lollywood actors
