= Khalid Butt (actor) =

Pakistani actor and director (1946–2024)

- خالد بٹ
- Born: Khalid Saleem Butt; 21 September 1946; Multan, Punjab, British India
- Died: 11 January 2024 (aged 77); Lahore, Punjab, Pakistan
- Occupations: Actor; director
- Years active: 1970–2024
- Notable work: Khaie (2023–24); GT Road (2019)

Khalid Saleem Butt (Urdu: خالد سلیم بٹ; 21 September 1946 – 11 January 2024) was a Pakistani actor and director. He made his debut in the 1970s and thereafter appeared in Urdu and Punjabi films and television series.

== Early life ==
Butt was born and raised in Multan, Punjab. He then moved to Lahore in 1979 to make a career in acting. His brother Zahid Saleem was also an actor.

== Career ==
Butt made his debut in the 1970s and thereafter appeared in Urdu and Punjabi films and television series. He started his career as Assistant Director and went on to direct film as well. However, it was television where he found fame and popularity.

Butt appeared in PTV's productions such as Janjaal Pura (1997), Boota from Toba Tek Singh (1999), Landa Bazar (2002). His later appearances include Love, Life Aur Lahore (2011–13), Laal Ishq (2017) and GT Road (2019). The 2023 TV dramas Khaie and Jeevan Nagar constituted his last acting credits.

== Death ==
Butt died on 11 January 2024 due to kidney and liver disease.

== Filmography ==
=== Films ===
Year	Title	Role	Notes
1970	Ek Phool Ek Pathar		
2015	Shah		
2016	Rahm	Nawab Nasrullah	
2018	Motorcycle Girl	Cook at Dhaba	
2018	Wajood		
2025	Delhi Gate		

=== Television serials ===
Year	Title	Role	Notes
1980	Teesra Kinara	Sikandar	
1980	Nishan e Haider: Captain Mohammad Sarwar Shaheed	Major Shabbir Hussain	
1989	Neelay Hath	Muhammad Deen	
1999	Boota from Toba Tek Singh	Boota's father	
1999	Chandpur Ka Chandoo	Hameed	
2000	Good Bye Raishman	Waqar	
2001	Kajal Ghar	Khursheed Munawar	
2002–2003	Landa Bazar		
2005	Apnay Huay Paraay	Mama Salamat	
2011	Khuda Aur Muhabbat (season 1)	Shakir	
2011–2013	Love, Life Aur Lahore	Mian Ji	
2012	Kuch Pyar Ka Pagalpan	Kiran's father	
2012	Durr-e-Shehwar	Mansoor's father	
2012	Mil Ke Bhi Hum Na Mile		
2015	Ishq Ibadat		
2016	Shaam Dhaley		
2016	Parizaad		
2016	Khoobsurat		
2017	Adhi Gawahi	Naeem	
2017	Hari Hari Churiyaan	Hashim	
2017	Imam Zamin		
2017	Mujhay Jeenay Do	Moulvi Sahab	
2017	Neelam Kinaray	Laraib's father	
2017	Laal Ishq	Master Ji	
2018	Ghughi	Lal Chand	
2018	Rashk	Kamal	
2018	Main Haar Nahi Manoun Gi	Shakeel	
2018	Adhuri Kahani	Nazir	
2018–2019	Bol Kaffara	Nazeer	
2019	Qismat	Nasir	
2019	GT Road	Ghulam Talib	
2020	Saza e Ishq	Salman	
2020	Tum Se Kehna Tha	Yusra and Rabi's father	
2020	Terha Aangan	Chaudhry Sahab	
2022	Ishq E Laa	Zain's father	
2023	Jeevan Nagar	Hanif	
2023	Khaie	Durab Khan	
