= Production =

Production may refer to:

== Economics and business ==
- Production (economics)
- Production, the act of manufacturing goods
- Production, in the outline of industrial organization, the act of making products (goods and services)
- Production as a statistic, gross domestic product
- Production line

== Arts, entertainment, and media ==
- Production, the act or role of assembling, crafting, creating, or presenting, a work of art, or the work of art itself.

=== Motion pictures ===
- Production, film distributor of a company
- Production, phase of filmmaking
- Production, video production

=== Other uses in arts, entertainment, and media ===
- Production (album), by Mirwais, 2000
- Production, category of illusory magic trick
- Production, phase of video games development
- Production, Record producer's role
- Production, theatrical performance

== Science and technology ==
- Production, deployment environment where changes go "live" and users interact with it
- Production (computer science), formal-grammar concept
- Primary production, the production of new biomass by autotrophs in ecosystems
- Productivity (ecology), the wider concept of biomass production in ecosystems

== See also ==
- Consumption (economics)
- Means of production
- Producer (disambiguation)
- Product (disambiguation)
- Production rule (disambiguation)
- Production system (disambiguation)
