= Babar Ali =

Pakistani film and television actor (born 1972)

- Born: 30 June 1972 (age 54); Karachi, Sindh, Pakistan
- Education: Gulistan Shah Abdul Latif School
- Occupations: Actor, TV host
- Years active: 1994 - present
- Known for: Labbaik (PTV); Landa Bazar; Laal Ishq; Yeh Dil Aap Ka Huwa
- Children: 2
- Awards: Nigar Award in 2000

Babar Ali (Urdu: بابر علی; born 30 June 1972) is a Pakistani film and television actor. He started his career in the late 1980s at the age of 16.

Babar Ali is better known for playing 'Bali' in the drama serial Landa Bazaar (2002-2003) and Biyanam in Main Manto Nahi Hoon (2025), both written by Khalil-ur-Rehman Qamar.

== Career ==
Babar Ali's first film appearance was in Jeeva (1995), directed by Syed Noor, where he played the second male lead as a Pashtun character. He went on to appear in other films such as Munda Bigra Jaye (1995), Chor Machaye Shor (1996), Khoey Ho Tum Kahan (2001), Yeh Dil Aap Ka Huwa (2002) and Larki Punjaban (2003). On television his most noted role has been that of Bali, the lead character in the 2002 PTV series Landa Bazar.

In 2017, Babar revived his character of Bali (Iqbal) in Laal Ishq, which was a sequel to the original 2002 drama series.

In 2022, he played Sardar Jatt in The Legend of Maula Jatt.

== Selected filmography ==
=== Films ===
Year	Title	Role	Language	Notes	Ref(s)
1995	Jeeva	Gul	Urdu	Film debut	
1995	Love 95		Urdu		
1995	Jo Darr Gya Woh Marr Gya	Asad	Urdu		
1995	Sarak		Urdu		
1995	Munda Bigra Jaye	Salman / Babar	Urdu		
1996	Baazigar		Urdu		
1996	Beqaboo		Urdu	Negative role	
1996	Miss Istanbul		Urdu		
1996	Lakht-e-Jigar		Urdu		
1997	Qarz		Urdu		
1997	Aqabon Ka Nisheman		Urdu		
1997	Khuda Janey		Urdu		
1997	Raja Pakistani		Urdu		
1997	Dever Dewanay		Urdu		
1998	Zever		Urdu		
1998	Dewarain		Urdu		
1998	Dil Sanbhala Na Jaye		Urdu		
1998	Harjai		Urdu		
1998	Dulha Lay Kar Jaoun Gi		Urdu		
1998	Chor Machaye Shor	Shehryar	Urdu		
1998	Insaf Ho To Aisa		Urdu		
1999	Kursi Aur Qanoon	Kali	Urdu	Negative role	
1999	Mujhe Jeene Do		Urdu		
2000	Ghar Kab Aao Gay	Oberoi	Urdu	Negative role	
2000	Mehndi Waley Hath	Mattu	Punjabi	Negative role	
2001	Khoey Ho Tum Kahan	Sherry	Urdu	Negative role	
2002	Yeh Dil Aap Ka Huwa	Zargul	Urdu		
2003	Larki Punjaban		Punjabi	Negative role	
2005	Naag aur Nagin		Urdu		
2008	Gulabo		Punjabi		
2010	Channa Sachi Muchi	Surya	Punjabi	Negative role	
2011	Bhai Log	Faizu	Urdu		
2011	Son of Pakistan	Ali Abu Zahid	Urdu	Negative role	
2017	Geo Sar Utha Kay	Rohail	Urdu	Negative role	
2022	Tere Bajre Di Rakhi	Alam	Punjabi	Cameo	
2022	The Legend of Maula Jatt	Sardar Jatt	Punjabi	Cameo	
2024	Taxali Gate	Chaudhry Shehryar	Urdu		
2026	Zombeid		Urdu		
TBA	Meri Jaan		Urdu		

=== Television ===
==== Actor ====
Year	Drama Title	Role	Channel
1994	Shee Jee		NTM
1996	Labaik	Mohammad Bin Qasim	PTV Home
1997	Babar	Humayun Mirza	PTV Home
1999	Boota from Toba Tek Singh	Meeru	PTV Home
2001	Chand Chehra		PTV Home
2002	Landa Bazar	Baali/Iqbal	PTV Home
2008	Muthi Bhar Chaawal	Tiloka Singh	TV One
2009	Mishaal	Rashid: Mishaal's elder brother	PTV Home
2010	Chunri	Tufail	PTV Home
2011	Ek Nazar Meri Taraf		Geo TV
2011	Nazar		PTV Home
2012	Mil Ke Bhi Hum Na Mile	Achoo	Geo TV
2012	Main	Baber	PTV Home
2014	Oas		PTV Home
2016	Wafa	Daniyal	Geo TV
2017	Kabhi Socha Na Tha	Salman	Geo TV
2017	Rani	Shah Murad	Geo TV
2017	Laal Ishq	Baali/Iqbal	A-Plus TV
2020	Tarap	Laeeq	Hum TV
2020	Zebaish	Parvaiz Javed	Hum TV
2021	Amanat	Malik Furqan	ARY Digital
2022	Mor Moharan	Sher Aalam	TV One
2022	Wehem	Khawar Amin	Hum TV
2022	Wehshi	Majid	Hum TV
2022	Woh Pagal Si	Ahsan Hayat	ARY Digital
2022	Muqaddar Ka Sitara	Safdar Kamal	ARY Digital
2023	Kuch Ankahi	Thanvi	ARY Digital
2023	Fatima Feng	Jahangir	Green Entertainment
2023	Siyaah	Jamal	Green Entertainment
2023	Namak Haram	Amin Qureshi	Hum TV
2024	Ghair	Usman	ARY Digital
2025	Main Manto Nahi Hoon	Binyamin	ARY Digital
2025	Pal Do Pal	Wahab	ARY Digital

==== Host ====
- Morning with Babar Ali (Apna Channel)

== Awards ==
- Nigar Award for Best Male Singer in film Mehndi Waley Hath (2000).

Ceremony	Category	Project	Result
1st Lux Style Awards	Best Film Actor	N/A	Nominated
3rd Lux Style Awards	Best Film Actor	Larki Panjaban	Nominated
10th Lux Style Awards	Best TV Actor (Terrestrial)	Uss Par	Nominated
12th Lux Style Awards	Best TV Actor (Terrestrial)	Mein	Nominated

== See also ==
- List of Lollywood actors
