= GT Road (TV series) =

- Title screen GT Road
- Genre: Drama; Romance; Sitcom
- Written by: Sara Qayyum
- Directed by: Dilawar Malik
- Starring: Asma Abbas; Memoona Qudoos; Khalid Butt; Sonia Mishal; Kashif Mehmood; Aijaz Aslam; Inayat Khan
- Country of origin: Pakistan
- Original language: Urdu
- No. of episodes: 52

Production
- Producer: Khurram Riaz
- Running time: 30–45 minutes
- Production company: Oriental Films

Original release
- Network: A-Plus Entertainment
- Release: 16 October 2019 – 24 September 2020

GT Road is a 2019 Pakistani family drama television series that originally aired on A-Plus Entertainment from 16 October 2019. It stars Asma Abbas, Khalid Butt, Inayat Khan, Sonia Mishal, Aijaz Aslam and Kashif Mehmood.

== Plot ==
It revolves around the residents of a housing society GT Road, who help each other find solutions to their common, real-life challenges in sticky situations. At the same time, they also fight each other on petty issues.

== Cast ==
- Sonia Mishal as Nageena
- Asma Abbas as Fatima
- Inayat Khan as Shuja
- Kashif Mehmood as Tufail
- Aijaz Aslam
- Aliha Chaudry as Kausar
- Khalid Butt as Ghulam Talib
- Memoona Qudoos as Feroza
- Maria Malik as Ayesha
- Sumbul Shahid as Nageena's mother
