= Waseem Abbas =

Pakistani actor and director

Waseem Abbas Pride of Performance Award
- وسیم عباس
- Born: 9 September 1960 (age 66); Lahore, Punjab, Pakistan
- Occupations: Actor; Director; Screenwriter
- Years active: 1978–present
- Spouse: Saba Hameed
- Children: Ali Abbas (son)
- Parent: Inayat Hussain Bhatti (father)
- Relatives: Kaifi (uncle); Hameed Akhtar (father-in-law); Aagha Ali (nephew)

Waseem Abbas (Urdu: وسِیم عبّاس; born 9 September 1960) is a Pakistani television, stage and film actor, screenwriter and director.

He is known for his roles in television dramas for the Pakistan Television (PTV), the country's public service broadcaster, and other networks, including Samundar, Raat, Ashiyana, Family Front (which he also directed), Landa Bazar and Din.

== Early and personal life ==
Waseem Abbas was born in Lahore, Punjab on 9 September 1960.

He is the son of singer, actor and director Inayat Hussain Bhatti. His paternal uncle Kaifi (full name Kifayat Hussain Bhatti) was also an actor and director.

He has three sisters and an elder brother, Nadeem Abbas Bhatti, who worked as an actor before switching to film production and distribution.

He has four children from his first marriage. He divorced his wife and married actress Saba Hameed in 1993. In 2026, he confirmed that their marriage had lasted 29 years but that they were now divorced. His son from his first marriage, Ali Abbas, is also an actor.

Through one of his sisters, his nephew is actor and singer Aagha Ali.

== Career ==
His father, Inayat Hussain Bhatti, was against his decision to join the entertainment industry, and when he tried his luck on radio he was rejected. He then became an assistant director for a stage play, where he would also act, before getting his TV break on the PTV drama Ek Haqeeqat Ek Fasana in 1978.

== Filmography ==
=== Films ===
| Year | Title | Director | Language | Note |
|---|---|---|---|---|
| 1981 | Manzil | S. Suleman | Urdu | Lead role |
| 1982 | Aina Aur Zindagi | Zafar Shahab | Urdu | Lead role |
| 1982 | Zara Si Baat | Nazar Shahab | Urdu | Lead role |
| 1983 | Tina | Jan Mohammad Jamman | Urdu | Lead role |
| 1983 | Badaltay Rishtay | Shamas Chodhary | Urdu | Lead role |
| 1984 | Naseebon Wali | Shamas Chodhary | Urdu | Lead role |
| 1985 | Shah Behram | Kaifi | Punjabi | Supporting role |
| 1985 | Haq Mehar | Iftikhar Khan | Punjabi | Lead role |
| 1986 | First Blood | Nazad Ali Fartash | Urdu | Lead role |
| 1987 | Jugnu | Faiz Malik | Punjabi | Lead role |
| 1988 | Jatt Majhay Da | Masood Butt | Punjabi | Lead role |
| 1989 | Taqatwar | Hasnain | Punjabi | Supporting role |
| 1989 | Ishq Rog | Kaifee | Punjabi | Lead role |
| 1990 | Sarmaya | M. Idrees Khan | Punjabi | Lead role |
| 1991 | Action | Kaifee | Punjabi | Lead role |
| 1992 | Mera Inteqam | Faiz Malik | Punjabi | Supporting role |
| 2017 | Punjab Nahi Jaungi | Nadeem Baig | Urdu/Punjabi | Supporting role |

=== Television serials ===
| Year | Title | Role | Director | Screenwriter | Channel |
|---|---|---|---|---|---|
| 1983 | Samundar | Yasir | | | PTV |
| 1986 | Hazaron Raaste | Zubair | | | PTV |
| 1987 | Raat | Gulrez | | | PTV |
| 1990 | Fishaar | Fareed | | | PTV |
| 1992 | Din | Faran | | | PTV |
| 1995 | Raiza Raiza | Qadir | | | PTV |
| 1997 | Ashiyana | Nouman | | | PTV |
| 1997 | Family Front | Azam | Yes | | PTV |
| 1998 | Home Sweet Home | Kashif | Yes | | PTV |
| 2002 | Landa Bazar | Mehar Charagh | | | STN |
| 2005 | Double Sawari | Chiraag | Yes | Yes | PTV |
| 2006 | Mr. & Misses | Saleem | Yes | | PTV Home |
| 2007 | Lahori Gate | | | Yes | PTV Home |
| 2008 | Choki # 420 | | Yes | Yes | Aaj News |
| 2010 | Natak Mandi | | Yes | Yes | PTV |
| 2011 | Anokhi | | | | A-Plus TV |
| 2011 | Samundar Jheel Kaisay Ho | | | | PTV |
| 2012 | Mera Saaein (season 2) | Malik Yawar Hayat | | | ARY Digital |
| 2013 | Zindagi Gulzar Hai | Mohammad Murtaza | | | Hum TV |
| 2013 | Parchaiyan | Qazim | | | ARY Digital |
| 2013 | Babar Javed | Farhan | | | Geo News |
| 2014 | Kala Jadoo (season 2) | | | | ARY Digital Network |
| 2014 | Ladoon Mein Pali | Laraib's father | Yes | | Geo News |
| 2015 | Mera Naam Yousuf Hai | Maulvi Noor Mohammed | | | A-Plus Entertainment |
| 2015 | Tumhari Natasha | Natasha's father | | | Hum TV |
| 2015 | Maan | Rashid | | | Hum TV |
| 2015 | Bay Qasoor | Waseem | | | ARY Digital |
| 2016 | Deewana | Tabraiz | | | Hum TV |
| 2016 | Aap Ke Liye | Imdad Hussain | | | ARY Digital |
| 2017 | Nazr-e-Bad | Shafiq Ur Rehman | | | Hum TV |
| 2017 | Yeh Shaadi Nahi Ho Sakti | Tasleem Butt | | | ARY Digital |
| 2017 | Dil Nawaz | Khalid | | | A-Plus TV |
| 2017 | Lal Ishq | Mehr | | | A-Plus TV |
| 2017 | Faisla | | | | ARY Digital |
| 2018 | Do Biwiyan Ek Bechara | | | Yes | ARY Digital |
| 2018 | Qaid | Taufiq | | | Geo News |
| 2019 | Kaisa Hai Naseeban | Jamal | | | ARY Digital |
| 2019 | Meher Aur Meherban | Munawwar Hayaat | | | Urdu 1 |
| 2019 | Hania | Ahsan | | | ARY Digital |
| 2019 | Mein Na Janoo | Waleed | | | Hum TV |
| 2019 | Naqab Zan | Dua's father | | | Hum TV |
| 2020 | Kashf | Imtiaz Ahmed | | | Hum TV |
| 2020 | Prem Gali | Hamza's father | | | ARY Digital |
| 2021 | Sila-e-Mohabbat | Tabrez's father | | | Hum TV |
| 2021 | Bebasi | Tameezuddin | | | Hum TV |
| 2021 | Mere Humsafar | Raees | | | ARY Digital |
| 2021 | Khuda Aur Muhabbat season 3 | Taufeeq | | | Geo Entertainment |
| 2022 | Zakham | Arif | | | Geo Entertainment |
| 2023 | Heer Da Hero | Arshad Butt | | | Geo Entertainment |
| 2023 | Jinnzada | | | | Geo Entertainment |
| 2023 | Pyari Nimmo | Hanif | | | Geo Entertainment |
| 2023 | Dooriyan | | | | Hum TV |
| 2024 | Akhara | Chaudhry Hakim Ali | | | Green Entertainment |
| 2025 | Masoom | Nawab | | | Hum TV |

== Awards and recognition ==
| Year | Title | Presented By | Ref. |
|---|---|---|---|
| 2016 | Pride of Performance | President of Pakistan | |
