= Fiza Ali =

Pakistani model, host, VJ, singer and actress

Fiza Ali فِضا علی
- Also known as: Fiza Ali Jonas
- Born: Fiza Ali; 5 October 1980 (age 46); Karachi, Sindh, Pakistan; Lahore, Punjab Pakistan
- Genres: Indian pop; Folk; Rock; Sufi; Pop
- Occupations: Actress; Model; Video Jockey; Host; Singer-songwriter; Composer; Producer
- Years active: 1999–present
- Labels: A-Plus TV productions; Massive Mix Records; Jazba Entertainment Ltd; Rokhri Productions; Fiza Ali productions; Rokhri Brothers; Freebird Records; The Panther Records; Malkoo Studio; Ltn Family Presentation; Warner Music; Universal Music India
- Spouse(s): Fawad Farooq (m. 2007; div. 2017) Faraal Fawad (m. 2014) Ejaz Khan (m. 2026)

Fiza Ali also known as Fiza Ali Jonas (فِضا علی; pronounced [fizːa alːi]) is a Pakistani model, actress, host, VJ, producer, composer, songwriter and singer. She started her modeling career in 1999. She made her acting debut in 2003, with the drama serial Mehndi, and has also appeared in Love Life Aur Lahore, Chunri, Woh Subah Kab Aayegi and Moum. In 2012–2013, she hosted a morning show called Subh Ki Fiza on A-Plus. Ali also hosted ARY Zindagi's game show Eidi Sab Kay Liye (2016–2018).

== Filmography ==
Key
| † | Denotes films that have not yet been released |

=== Film ===
| Year | Title | Role | Notes | Ref |
|---|---|---|---|---|
| 2019 | Kaaf Kangana | Anjali | Debut film | |

=== Telefilm ===
| Year | Title | Role | Notes |
|---|---|---|---|
| 2004 | Mary's Sacrifice Aka Marium | Chammo | Telefilm |
| 2005 | Aik Mohabbat Aur sahi | | Telefilm |
| 2006 | Chahey Mera Dil | Nimra | Telefilm |
| 2007 | Dowry List | Abida | Telefilm |
| 2009 | Seeta Zainab | Seeta | Telefilm |
| 2010 | Choo Lo Zindagi Ko | Maid | Telefilm |
| 2021 | Nazdikiyan | Faryal | Telefilm |

=== Short film ===
| Year | Title | Role | Notes |
|---|---|---|---|
| 2020 | Main Bikhar Gaee | Naina | Short film |

=== Television ===
==== Drama ====
| Year | Title | Role | Channel | Notes |
|---|---|---|---|---|
| 2003 | Mehndi | Laiba | PTV | 10 episodes |
| 2003 | Jayen Kahan Armaan | | ARY DIGITAL | |
| 2003 | Tapish | | PTV | 14 episodes |
| 2004 | Ajnabi Raste Ajnabi Manzalein | Sana | PTV | |
| 2004 | Jugnu Aur Anchal | Anita | PTV | |
| 2004 | Bheegi Palkain | | Indus Vision | |
| 2004 | Azal | Fatima | Indus Vision | 9 Episodes |
| 2004 | Adhoray Khawab | Aiza | Indus Vision | 42 episodes |
| 2005 | Kaanch | | ARY Digital | |
| 2005 | Saath Nibhana Hy | Nosheen | PTV | |
| 2005 | Batain Dil Ki | Sunbla | PTV | 16 episodes |
| 2006 | Saat Sur Rishton Ke | Saman | PTV | 15 episodes |
| 2006 | Lagan | Fiza | PTV | 14 episodes |
| 2007 | Yaadain | | PTV | |
| 2007 | Apny Huye Paraye | | PTV | |
| 2008 | Ahsaas | Nosheen | PTV | |
| 2008 | Sheeshy Ka Mehal | | PTV | |
| 2008 | Woh Subah Kab Aayegi | | ATV | 33 episodes |
| 2008 | Awaaz | | PTV | 26 episodes |
| 2008 | Zara Si Ghalat Fehmi | Nosheen | PTV | 26 episodes |
| 2009 | Pyari Shammo | Shammo | Geo Entertainment | |
| 2009 | 93 Shumali | | ARY Digital | |
| 2010 | Kaisey Kahoon | Maryam | PTV | |
| 2010 | Moum | Heer | PTV | |
| 2010 | Chunri | Minal | PTV | 16 Episodes |
| 2010 | Roger (TV series) | Faiza | PTV | 13 Episodes |
| 2010 | Kanpur Se Katas Tak | Ibadat | Indus Vision | |
| 2010 | Qaatil Haseena | | ATV | |
| 2010-2013 | Love, Life aur Lahore | Lubna | A plus ATV | 420 episodes |
| 2011 | Tum Ho Ke Chup | Pariwash | Geo Entertainment | 21 Episodes |
| 2012 | Aik Hath Ki Taali | Afreen | TV One Pakistan | 21 episodes |
| 2012 | Zindagi Ki Raah Main | Zoya | PTV | 20 episodes |
| 2012 | Sirat e Mustaqeem | Abeer | Express Entertainment | 26 Episodes |
| 2012 | Dasht e Mohabbat | Najma | PTV | 15 episodes |
| 2012 | Sasural Genda Phool | Fiza | A-Plus TV | |
| 2012 | Mah-e-Tamam | | Express Entertainment | |
| 2013 | Ghaao | Alizeh | Geo TV | 23 Episodes |
| 2013 | Bhool | Saman | PTV | |
| 2013 | Muhabbat Waham Hai | Sana | PTV | 26 episodes |
| 2013-2014 | Miss Fire | Jeeni | Geo Kahani; Geo Entertainment | 27 episodes |
| 2014 | Tum Woh Nahi | Sadaf | Express Entertainment | 17 episodes |
| 2015 | Yeh Pyaar Hai | Midhat | TV One Pakistan | 29 episodes |
| 2015 | Zindagi Mujhe Tera Pata Chahiye | Meerab Shah | PTV Home | 100 episodes |
| 2016 | Shaam Dhaley | Saima | Geo Entertainment | 22 episodes |
| 2016 | Kesi Khushi Le Kay Aya Chaand | Zainab | A plus | |
| 2016 | Mor Mahal | Surayya Jehan | Geo Entertainment | 43 episodes |
| 2016 | Fasley | Naina | PTV | 27 episodes |
| 2017–2019 | Naagin | Rani | Geo Kahani | 203 episodes |
| 2018 | Tapasya | Chanda | YouTube Series | 19 episodes |
| 2021 | Ishq Tera | Bano | Sab Tv Pakistan | 55 episodes |
| 2023 | Thana Tick Tock | Kinza Hayat (Note: Ali played dual roles in the drama.) | Sab Tv Pakistan | 62 episodes |
| 2024 | Pyar Ki Hathkariyan | | Sab Tv Pakistan | 38 episodes |
| TBA | Faslay Main Darmiyan | | Green Entertainment | |

=== Anthology Series ===
| Year | Title | Role | Channel | Note |
|---|---|---|---|---|
| 2004 | Mera Naam Hai Mohabbat | Maheen | Indus Vision | Episode "Sare Raah Chalty Chalty" |
| 2010 | Talluq | Nisha | Geo Entertainment | Episode 23 |
| 2013 | Bahar ki Shahkar Film | | A-Plus TV | Episode "Kuch Mohabbat Phir Se Kar Le" |

=== Hosting Gigs ===
==== As a Host ====
| Year | Title | Role | Network | Notes |
|---|---|---|---|---|
| 2011–2012 | Hari Mirchian | | Dunya News | |
| 2012 | Chandni Batain With Fiza Ali (Live) | Host/Debut | A-Plus TV | |
| 2012 | Eid Ka Rose Mubarak | Host/Debut | A-Plus TV | 3 episodes |
| 2012 | Ganay Shadiyane | Host/Debut | A-Plus TV | |
| 2012–2013 | Subh Ki Fiza (Live) | Host/Debut | A-Plus TV | 227 episodes |
| 2013–2015 | Hum Sab Umeed Se Hain | Host/Debut | Geo Tez; Geo News | |
| 2013 | Eid Live show | Host/Debut | Express News | |
| 2014 | Iftar Ka Samaa (LIVE) | Host/Debut | Samaa TV | 29 episodes |
| 2015–2016 | Ho Jaye Muqabla | Host/Debut | PTV Home | |
| 2016 | Siyasi Pakwaan | Host/Debut | Dunya News | 2 episodes |
| 2016–2018 | Eidi Sab Kay Liye (Live) | Host/Debut | ARY Zindagi | |
| 2017 | IPPA Awards | Host/Debut | Hum TV | 1 episode |
| 2018–2022 | Taroun Se Karain Batain | Host/Debut | GNN | |
| 2021 | Tohfa Eman Mah-e-Ramzan (LIVE) | Host/Debut | LTN Family | |
| 2021 | Eid Eshass | Host/Debut | GNN | |
| 2021 | Eid e Qurban | Host/Debut | GNN | 2 episodes |
| 2021 | Jeet Kay Jang | Host/Debut | GNN | |
| 2024–2026 | Morning with Fiza (Live) | Host/Debut | 24 News HD | |
| 2024–2026 | Noor-e-Ramadan | Host/Debut | 24 News HD | |
| 2024–2026 | Eid Pur Noor | Host/Debut | 24 News HD | |
| 2024–2026 | Eid Qurban | Host/Debut | 24 News HD | |
| TBA | upcoming | Host/Debut | | |

=== TV commercials ===
- 2007 | Sonali lawn
- 2013 | PTCL Smart Tv
- 2013 | Deluxe Palm Soap
- 2014 | Crystal Beauty Soap
- 2014 | Golden Pasta
- 2014 | Mobilink
- 2014 | Bigen Easy & Natural
- 2019 | Lifebuoy Shampoo
- 2020 | Rahim Store Featuring Ahmed Ali Butt
- 2021 | Meiji Big
- 2022 | Taimoor Fans
- 2022 | Al-Eshan Garden
- 2025–26 | Qamar Tea

== Discography ==
=== Singles ===
| Year | Title | Singer(s) | Label | |
|---|---|---|---|---|
| 2011 | Subh Ki Fiza | Fiza Ali, RFAK | A-Plus TV productions, Universal Music India | |
| 2020 | Wedding Sehra | Fiza Ali, Mazhar Rahi | The Panther Records | |
| 2020 | Judai | Fiza Ali, Zeeshan Rokhri | Rokhri Brothers | |
| 2020 | Dhol Jani | Fiza Ali, Zeeshan Rokhri | Rokhri Brothers | |
| 2020 | Dhol Wafadara | Fiza Ali, Zeeshan Rokhri | Rokhri Brothers | |
| 2020 | Din Chaar | Fiza Ali | The Panther Records | |
| 2021 | Meda Koka | Fiza Ali, Zeeshan Rokhri | Rokhri Productions | |
| 2021 | Harra Rang | Fiza Ali, Mazhar Rahi | The Panther Records | |
| 2021 | Piyara Pakistan | Fiza Ali, Mazhar Rahi | The Panther Records | |
| 2021 | Mehndi Ki Raat | Fiza Ali, Mazhar Rahi | Massive Mix Records | |
| 2021 | Dhola Pindi Diya | Fiza Ali, Malkoo | Malkoo Studio | |
| 2021 | Jaani | Fiza Ali, Malkoo | Malkoo Studio | |
| 2021 | Yaar Di Shaadi | Fiza Ali, Malkoo | Malkoo Studio | |
| 2021 | Tohfa Eman Mah-e-Ramzan | Fiza Ali | Ltn Family Presentation | |
| 2022 | Dhool Islamabad Da | Fiza Ali, Mazhar Rahi | The Panther Records | |
| 2022 | Dhola | Fiza Ali, Mazhar Rahi | The Panther Records | |
| 2022 | Rangraliyan | Fiza Ali, Mazhar Rahi | The Panther Records | |
| 2023 | Raat | Fiza Ali | Fiza Ali | |
| 2023 | Bewafa | Fiza Ali | Fiza Ali | |
| 2023 | Zaalima | Fiza Ali | Fiza Ali | |
| 2023 | Gharoli | Fiza Ali | Fiza Ali | |
| 2023 | Mehrama | Fiza Ali | Fiza Ali | |
| 2023 | Chandani | Fiza Ali | Fiza Ali | Jazba Entertainment Ltd |
| 2023 | Shala | Fiza Ali | Fiza Ali | Jazba Entertainment Ltd |
| 2024 | Raatan Lambiyaan | Fiza Ali | Fiza Ali | Jazba Entertainment Ltd |
| 2024 | Kali Kali Zalfon Kay | Fiza Ali | Fiza Ali | Jazba Entertainment Ltd |
| 2024 | Mehrma Ve | Fiza Ali | Fiza Ali | Jazba Entertainment Ltd |
| 2024 | Satranga Ishq | Fiza Ali | Fiza Ali | Jazba Entertainment Ltd |
| 2024 | Door Ja Na | Fiza Ali | Fiza Ali | Jazba Entertainment Ltd |
| 2025 | Maan Bharya | Fiza Ali | Fiza Ali | Jazba Entertainment Ltd |
| 2025 | Makhi | Fiza Ali | Fiza Ali | Jazba Entertainment Ltd |
| 2025 | Aa | Arif Lohar, Roach Killa, Fiza Ali, Deep Jandu | ARY Films, Jazz Pakistan | Jazba Entertainment Ltd |
| 2025 | Mehndi Wali Raat (Mehndi Night) | Fiza Ali | Warner Music | Jazba Entertainment Ltd |
| 2025 | Chan Mere Rakhna (Pick Me) | Fiza Ali | Warner Music | Jazba Entertainment Ltd |
| 2025 | Ek Pyaar Ka Naghma Hai | Fiza Ali,Faraal | Universal Music India | Jazba Entertainment Ltd |
| TBA | | | | Jazba Entertainment Ltd |

=== Featured Artists ===
- 2011 | Subh Ki fiza
- 2025 | Aa
- 2025 | Mendhi Wali Raat
- 2025 | Chan Mere Rakhna
- 2025 | Ek Pyaar Ka Naghma Hai

== Awards and nominations ==
=== Accolades ===
| Year | Work | Award | Result | Refs |
1st Indus Drama Awards
| 2005 | Bheegi Palkain | Best Actress Serial | Nominated | |
13th PTV Awards
| 2006 | Ajnabi Rastey Ajnabi Manzilain | Best Actress | Nominated | |
12th Lux Style Awards
| 2013 | Love Life Aur Lahore | Best Television Actress- Terrestrial | Nominated | |
IPPA Awards
| 2021 | Taroun Se Karain Batain | Best TV Presenter of the Year | Nominated | |

== See also ==
- List of Pakistani actresses
