= Nighat Butt =

Pakistani actress (1948–2020)

- نگہت بٹ
- Born: 1948; Lahore, Punjab, Pakistan
- Died: 6 February 2020 (aged 72); Lahore, Punjab, Pakistan
- Education: University of Lahore
- Occupations: Actress, Singer
- Years active: 1966 – 2020
- Spouse: Abid Butt (m. 1968; died 2016)
- Children: Nomi Butt (son)
- Relatives: Nimmo (sister-in-law)
- Awards: Pride of Performance (2018)

Nighat Butt was a Pakistani actress and singer. Nighat acted in numerous television dramas and films.

== Early life ==
Nighat was born in 1948 in Lahore, Pakistan. She completed her studies from University of Lahore.

== Career ==
She started her acting career in theatre and first acted in films in the 1960s. She appeared in Urdu, Punjabi and Pashto films. She also sang songs in films and then starred in some of Abid Ali's dramas. She also appeared in telefilms and several dramas, including PTV's Samunder and Boota from Toba Tek Singh. For her contributions to the television industry, she was honored by the Government of Pakistan with the Pride of Performance in 2018.

== Personal life ==
Nighat was married to actor Abid Butt until his death in 2013. They had four biological children: three daughters, and one son named Nomi Butt. She also adopted and raised her deceased brother's two children (one daughter and a son).

== Illness and death ==
She was a cancer survivor, and had developed blood pressure issues and diabetes. She died aged 72 on 6 February 2020, due to a cardiac arrest. She was laid to rest in E Block graveyard at Model Town in Lahore.

== Filmography ==
=== Television ===
| Year | Title | Role | Network |
|---|---|---|---|
| 1979 | Waris | Zubaida | PTV |
| 1979 | Alif Laila | Maa | PTV |
| 1981 | Alif Noon | Zareena's mother | PTV |
| 1983 | Shikayatain Hakayatain | Almas's mother | PTV |
| 1983 | Wadi-e-Purkhar | Karam-Un-Nisa | PTV |
| 1983 | Adhay Chehray | Lubna's mother | PTV |
| 1983 | Phoolon Wala Rasta | Hajra Begum | PTV |
| 1983 | Sahil | Bilqees Shekih | PTV |
| 1983 | Samundar | Qamar-un-Nisa | PTV |
| 1984 | Mirza & Sons | Waheedan | PTV |
| 1984 | Aankh Macholi | Begum Zaman | PTV |
| 1984 | Andhera Ujala | Asad's mother | PTV |
| 1985 | Satt Rangi Savair | Ammi Jan | PTV |
| 1985 | Drama 85 | Begum Sahiba | PTV |
| 1985 | Footpath Ki Ghaas | Zubaida | PTV |
| 1986 | Hazaron Raaste | Phuppo | PTV |
| 1986 | Sooraj Kay Saath Saath | Tufail Bibi | PTV |
| 1986 | Koi To Ho | Begum | PTV |
| 1986 | Khwabo Ka Jungle | Begum Imtiaz | PTV |
| 1986 | Rassi Ki Zanjeer | Jageehdari Dani | PTV |
| 1986 | Sacha Jhoot | Amy | PTV |
| 1987 | Dhund Kay Us Paar | Zainab | PTV |
| 1988 | Gumshuda | Nudrat | PTV |
| 1988 | Band Galli | Razia | PTV |
| 1989 | Aankh Macholly | Seema | PTV |
| 1989 | Fehmida ki kahani Ustani Rahat | Bilquis | PTV |
| 1989 | Pyas | Taj Bibi | PTV |
| 1991 | Ahsas Aur Kamtari | Raza's mother | PTV |
| 1993 | Khuwahish | Chiragh Bibi | PTV |
| 1993 | Fareb | Sakeena | PTV |
| 1994 | Kot Khair Deen | Malkani | PTV |
| 1994 | Manchalay Ka Sauda | Mrs. Nazeer | PTV |
| 1995 | Aapa | Ayesha | PTV |
| 1996 | Hairat Kadah | Zubida | PTV |
| 1996 | Teesra Aadmi | Gulrukh | PTV |
| 1996 | Ranjish | Saleha | PTV |
| 1997 | Ashiyana | Zarda | PTV |
| 1998 | Kanch Kay Par | Nasreen | PTV |
| 1999 | Boota from Toba Tek Singh | Boota's Mother | PTV |
| 1999 | Tawan | Badi Khala | PTV |
| 2000 | Sufaid Lamhay | Ishrat | PTV |
| 2001 | Baadlon Par Basera | Shumail's mother | PTV |
| 2001 | Duniya Dari | Faryal | PTV |
| 2002 | Landa Bazar | Hajran | PTV |
| 2003 | Fareb | Rohida | PTV |
| 2006 | Kharider | Ammi Gi | PTV |
| 2007 | Delhi Kay Bankay | Aapa | A-Plus |
| 2010 | Natak Mandi | Neelum's mother | PTV |
| 2012 | Pheli Barish | Zarina | PTV |

=== Telefilm ===
| Year | Title | Role |
|---|---|---|
| 1980 | Cinderella Aur Sakina | Sitara's mother |
| 1988 | Eid Train | Anna |
| 1999 | Bakra Bahot Zarori Hay | Atiqa |

=== Film ===
| Year | Title | Language |
|---|---|---|
| 1981 | Resham | Urdu |
| 1988 | Mukhra | Punjabi |
| 2011 | Mara Sona England | Punjabi |

== Awards and recognition ==
| Year | Award | Category | Result | Title | Ref. |
|---|---|---|---|---|---|
| 1998 | PTV Award | Best Actress | Won | Herself | |
| 2018 | Pride of Performance | Award by the President of Pakistan | Won | Herself | |
