= Naagin (Pakistani TV series) =

Pakistani TV Series

- Genre: Thriller; Supernatural; Revenge; Romantic; Mystery
- Written by: Iftikhar Ahmed Usmani
- Directed by: Shah Bilal
- Starring: Resham; Jana Malik; Wajeha Khan Durani; Sheen Javed; Hareb Farooq; Maira Bangash; Kashif Mehmood; Afzal Khan; Babrik Shah; Meera
- Country of origin: Pakistan
- Original language: Urdu
- No. of seasons: 4
- No. of episodes: 237

Production
- Producers: Areej; Blue Eye Entertainment
- Production locations: Lahore, Pakistan
- Camera setup: Multi-camera setup
- Running time: Ep 1-177 (30-40 minutes); Ep 178-237 (12-15 minutes)
- Production company: Blue Eye Entertainment

Original release
- Network: Geo Kahani
- Release: 17 April 2017 – 27 May 2019

Naagin (transl. Female Serpent) is a Pakistani supernatural thriller drama series, that aired from 17 April 2017 to 27 May 2019, for four seasons, on Geo Kahani. The series is produced by Babar Javed under the banner of Blue Eye Entertainment. The show stars Wajeeha Khan Durani, Sheen Javed, Resham, Jana Malik, Hareb Farooq, and Meera in leading roles. Apart from Pakistan, the show was also the most watched show of Geo Kahani in the United Kingdom. After 177 episodes, the show stopped airing on 6 May 2018, and was renewed almost a year later on 6 March 2019.

The producer of the show confirmed that there will be a new season for Naagin, which will hopefully come in 2022 with the same lead cast but with a new, fresh story.

== Plot ==
The story revolves around a house where the elders are aware that when they constructed the house they had to kill some snakes who were living there. But what they don't know is that there were two survivors (both girls); one is Muskaan, who was taken by an ordinary man who saw that snake in a baby form. The other girl (Sanam Jahan) was taken by a female snake charmer named Pashi. Sanam Jahan returns to this home to take revenge where Rayaan lives who falls in love with Muskaan who doesn't know that she is a Nagin yet. Muskaan gets into that home after marrying Rayaan and Sanam Jahan is already there. Sanam Jahan kills Khalida (maternal aunt of Rayaan) with her poisonous bite. The family is unaware of Sanam Jahan's evil intentions who wants to take revenge on her relatives. A female snake charmer named Sajna enters, she is finding an Iccha Dhaari Naagin. Banu, the girlfriend of Mehak's (Rayaan's sister) husband Salman blames Rayaan that he had destroyed her life and cheated on her and now she is pregnant with her and Rayaan's illegitimate baby. This is a wicked plan of Salman who wants to become the owner of Rayaan's property and Banu is her partner in this fake pregnancy game. After listening to the conversation between Salman and Banu, Sanam Jahan decides to kill Banu. Sanam Jahan murders Banu, and the blame has been put on Rayaan that he has done this murder. Muskaan also started believing that Rayaan has killed Banu to cover up his sin but later Mehak and Muskaan finds out that Rayaan is not involved in Banu's murder and this was a plan of Salman. Sanam Jahan also attempted the murder of his workmate Razzaq because Razzaq knew that Sanam Jahan is the killer of Khalida and that she is a Naagin, but somehow Daa Ji rescues Razzaq. Sajna knows that Muskaan is also an Iccha Dhaari Naagin but when she reveals this secret to Muskaan, Muskaan makes a joke of Sajna and also warns her to keep away from her in future otherwise she will call the police to have Sajna arrested. Sajna vows that she will teach a lesson to Muskaan about her misbehaviour.

Meanwhile, Muskaan's ex-lover Feroz returns from Sharjah after completing his studies and decides to break the relationship of Muskaan and Rayaan. Feroz and Arfa tries to create differences between them by creating an intimate moment of Feroz and Muskaan and Rayaan also falls into their wicked trap but after many twists and misunderstandings between Rayaan and Muskaan, finally Feroz confessed that this was the plan of Arfa and he is very guilty over his evil intentions. Rayaan forgives Muskaan and a new phase of their life has started but now Sanam Jahan is planning to kill Rayaan. During this process, Muskaan and Sanam Jahan also finds out that they are blood sisters in relation but Muskaan refuses to help Sanam Jahan in her revenge and rescues Daa Ji and Arfa from Sanam Jahan's poisonous bite.

Razzaq recovers and tries to prove that Sanam Jahan is a serpent but eventually got killed by Sanam Jahan. Nayel (A Naag) enters the house in the shape of Rayaan's best friend. He is the fiancé of Muskaan in the world of serpents. He forcibly tries to take Muskaan into their own world but she refused to go. After the rejection from Muskaan, Nayel proposes Saariya (Khalida's daughter) and she also accepts the proposal, being unaware of the fact that Nayel is a serpent. All family members are happy on their marriage but on the day of wedding, real Nayel reaches on the spot and exposes Naag Nayel. Naag Nayel escapes while Saariya lost her senses and eventually commit suicide. Nayel has also been killed during the process while Naag Nayel is badly injured and can't disguise into the form of human anymore. On the other side, Sanam Jahan marries Feroz on the advice of Pashi.

Professor Abdul Quddus is introduced, he is searching the treasure from past many years. Daa Ji hires Professor as he wants the translation of an ancient book called ''Kitaab-e-Hayat'' (Book of life) which is about serpents. Pashi and Sajna also want this book to originate their lover Dilbar (an evil shape-shifting cobra) but failed to do so, and after a lot of twists, Dilbar finally reborn by Professor, who eventually vanished from the world. The first season ends at this point.

The second season begins with the entry of Nevlas (mongooses) including King Salaaj, his partner Mastaani along with their slave Nijaat, who are searching for Wajahat. Dilbar lookalike Sohrab, who is a robber by profession, forcibly takes Sanam Jahan (who was finding Dilbar) to his house, and also seize her Naagmani. Sanam Jahan later develops a fake love relationship with Sohrab to regain her Naagmani, but failed to do as Sohrab gave the Naagmani to Madam Kaali, a wolf who is a well wisher of human beings. On the other hand, Dilbar enters Haweli as a doctor for the treatment of Daa Ji (Wajahat), who is in a critical condition since the day Sanam Jahan bites him. Dilbar is basically on an aim to generate a baby through Muskaan, who refused to do so. He seeks the help of Sajna to convince Muskaan. Mehak is now under occupancy of Kaali, while Rayaan has been kidnapped by Salaaj, who sent Rayaan's look-alike Saawan (mongoose) to Haweli so that no one will become doubtful. Muskaan, being unaware of the fact that he is Sawaan in the disguise of Rayaan, creates a romantic sequence with him. Few months later, Rayaan finally succeeds to escape from Salaaj and begin doubting on Muskaan's loyalty and love for him. Meanwhile, Dilbar prudently accomplished the murder of Feroz through Sanam Jahan, who falsely kills Feroz after being misguided by Dilbar. Sanam Jahan screams and vows to take revenge from Dilbar. Sanam Jahan also suffers a miscarriage.

Sanam Jahan along with King Salaaj murders Sohrab, leaving his fiancé Rani sorrowful. Later it is revealed by Muskaan and Sanam Jahan's guidance Amaa Jugno that both of them are Rani's sisters. During these days, Sajna and Dilbar attempt the murder of Rayaan and his family, however, Sanam Jahan and Muskaan team-up against them and the latter disguised into Pashi's look and creates a situation where Dilbar can be seen betraying with Sajna. Dejected and furious Sajna terminate Dilbar, which led to the happiness of Muskaan and Sanam Jahan. After realizing that it was a trap of them, Sajna threatened to destroy both of them.

Muskaan manages to release Mehak and Daa Ji from Madam Kaali, who later reveals that both Muskaan and Sanam Jahan, and their sister Rani, belongs to royal tribe of serpents. Muskaan is now on a mission to save her family from Sanam Jahan, who has married Salman and has entered Haweli, while Rani has also appeared at the moment, to support her sister Sanam Jahan to avenge the death of their parents.

At last King Salaaj was murdered by Sanam Jahan, Pashi and Muskan, as they got the two pieces of Moon.Then Sanam Jahan said to Muskan "Queen I will not take revenge from these people" but at last Sanam Jahan put Ashfaq, Salman and Arfa on fire and take Muskaan's crown and become the queen and murdered Muskaan and Rayaan and take away Muskaan's daughter with her. Meanwhile, Sajna was sent Sanam Jahan's daughter by Madam Kaali so that she may become a good naagin one who can save the world. At the end, a voice over starts "Aik Naagin apna badla leneh zaroor aatti hai; Dekhtey hain ke kya Muskan apna badla leneh atti hai".

== Cast ==
=== Main ===
- Wajeeha Khan Durani as Muskaan (shape-shifting snake)
- Sheen Javed as Sanam Jahan (shape-shifting snake)
- Hareb Farooq as Rayaan / Saawan
- Resham as Sajna (a female snake charmer)
- Jana Malik as Pashi (a female snake charmer)
- Razia Malik as Amma Jugnnu
- Shazia Zohar as Zainab (Muskan Daughter)

=== Recurring ===
- Kashif Mehmood as King Salaaj (shape-shifting mongoose)
- Mathira as Mastaani (shape-shifting mongoose)
- Meera as Madam Kaali / Rani Nageshwari
- Imran Ahmed as Wajahat
- Zia Khan as Ashfaq
- Fiza Ali / Sobia Khan as Rani (shape-shifting snake)
- Maira Bangash as Mehak
- Saima Saleem as Arfa
- Zaib Chaudhry as Khalida
- Fani Jaan as Razzaq
- Ayesha Javaid as Saariya
- Raheela Agha as old Sanam Jahan
- Abid Ali as Professor Abdul Quddus
- Babrik Shah as Dilbar (Naag Raja) / Sohrab)
- Afzal Khan Rambo as Golden Khan
- Arslan Mughal as Nayel (shape-shifting snake)
- Arsalan Idrees as Salman
- Rasheed Ali as Rehmat
- Huma Ali as Farkhanda
- Wajeeha Khan Durani as Muskaan (shape-shifting snake)
- Sheen Javed as Sanam Jahan (shape-shifting snake)
- Laila as Sofia (Professor Abdul Qaddus's shape-shifting snake)
- Kanwal ilyas as Feroza Kali's shape-shifting snake
- Fiza Ali / Sobia Khan as Rani, a shape-shifting snake
- Babrik Shah as Dillbar (Naag Raja)
- Arslan Mughal as Nayel (Sajna's snake)

== Production ==
=== Writing ===
Naagin is the first Pakistani television drama based on the subject of Ichchhadhari Nag. Iftikhar Ahmed Usmani, the writer of the series said that

The play is for the dissemination of the message of peace among silent majority of our nation which regularly watches the drama but rarely present their valuable remarks. My inspiration is Baba Ashfaq Ahmed, he was the one who guided me towards the right path.

— Iftikhar Ahmed Usmani

=== Casting ===
Actress Resham alongside Jana Malik, Sheen Javed, Wajeeha Khan and Hareb Farooq were initially finalized to play starring roles in the series. Later after the end of first season, actress Mathira was selected to portray a supporting character; along with Kashif Mehmood. Actress Fiza Ali was also portraying the parallel lead role of Rani but was replaced by Sobia Khan. In late 2017, actress Meera joined the cast, playing the positive character of Madam Kaali.

=== Filming ===
Filming of the show began in February 2016 in a Haweli, while the show is entirely filmed in Lahore. Previously another mega-budget Pakistani show Mor Mahal, was also being filmed in the same location. The filming was concluded on 4 June 2018.

== Reception ==
Despite receiving criticism from some media outlets, Naagin opened with a strong rating of 4.13 during its opening weekend, and witnessed 200% increment in ratings in just 6 episodes (From 0.98 to 2.78 average ratings). It also became the most watched show of Geo Kahani abroad, and during September 2017, the show fetched high ratings.

== See also ==
- 2017 in Pakistani television
