= Muhafiz (1998 film) =

- Directed by: Syed Noor
- Produced by: Sohail Butt
- Starring: Nadeem Baig; Shahid; Jana Malik; Saud; Saima Noor; Adeeb; Ali Ejaz; Safqat Cheema
- Cinematography: Ali Jan
- Music by: M. Arshad
- Release date: 30 January 1998
- Country: Pakistan
- Language: Urdu

Muhafiz is a 1998 Pakistani Urdu-language film directed by Syed Noor and produced by Sohail Butt. It starred Nadeem and Shahid in lead roles, accompanied by Saud, Saima Noor and Jana Malik.
