= Memoona Qudoos =

Pakistani actress

- Education: International Islamic University, Islamabad
- Occupations: Actress; Model
- Years active: 2016 – present
- Spouse: Sohail (m. 2019)

Memoona Qudoos is a Pakistani actress and model. She is known for her roles in dramas GT Road, Guddu, Farq, Nikah, Kalank, Umm-e-Haniya and Jaisay Aapki Marzi.

== Early life ==
Memoona completed her education in Mass Communication from International Islamic University, Islamabad.

== Career ==
During her studies she got interested in direction, production, script writing and video editing later she did an internship at PTV for a while before moving to Karachi. In 2016 she started working as a model for fashion brands and commercials. The same year she was offered many dramas by directors.

In 2017 actor Aijaz Aslam offered her a role in his drama production Chaiyeh Thora Pyar which she accepted and she did the role of Saba; later, actress Javeria Saud cast her in the drama Mohabbat Zindagi in which she did the role of Saba it received positive reviews. The many dramas who worked in later included Umm-e-Haniya, Kyunke Ishq Baraye Farokht Nahi, GT Road, and Siyani. In 2020 she worked in Turkish drama Khuda Gawah and she also learned Turkish language for her role. She also worked in dramas Marz-e-Ishq, Guddu, Farq, Behroop, Nikah and Agar Tum Mere Hote. She also appeared in dramas Ziddi, Kalank, Makafaat Season 5, Yehi to Pyar Hai and Sukoon. In 2023 she worked in drama Jaisay Aapki Marzi in which she did the role of Shehna it was directed by Saba Hameed and written by Naila Zehra Jafri.

== Personal life ==
She married Sohail a businessman in 2019.

== Filmography ==
=== Television ===
Year	Title	Role	Network
2017	Chaiyeh Thora Pyar	Saba	Play Entertainment
2017	Mohabbat Zindagi Hai	Beena	Express Entertainment
2018	Umm-e-Haniya	Shazia	Geo Entertainment
2018	Kyunke Ishq Baraye Farokht Nahi	Shanzay	A-Plus
2019	Mazaaq Raat	Herself	Dunya News
2019	GT Road	Feroza	A-Plus
2019	Mazaaq Raat	Herself	Dunya News
2020	Khuda Gawah	Momina	Geo TV
2020	Taron Sey Karen Batain	Herself	GNN
2020	Mazaaq Raat	Herself	Dunya News
2021	Marz-e-Ishq	Aniya	SAB TV
2021	Taron Sey Karen Batain	Herself	GNN
2022	Siyani	Maira	Geo Entertainment
2022	Guddu	Sharmeen	Geo TV
2022	Farq	Faryal	Geo Entertainment
2023	Nikah	Maham	Geo TV
2023	Agar Tum Mere Hote	Sundus	LTN Family
2023	Makafaat Season 5	Sehrish	Geo Entertainment
2023	Behroop	Khalida	Geo Entertainment
2023	Sotailay	Tania	PTV
2023	Ziddi	Samra	Aan TV
2023	Kalank	Sheena	Geo Entertainment
2023	Yehi to Pyar Hai	Natasha	A-Plus
2023	Jaisay Aapki Marzi	Shehna	ARY Digital
2023	Mein Kahani Hun	Sophie	Express Entertainment
2023	Sukoon	Natasha	ARY Digital
2024	Raaz	Mysterious girl	Green Entertainment
2024	Dikhawa Season 5	Areeba	Geo Entertainment
2024	Dao	Nisha	Geo Entertainment
2024	Meri Shahzadiyan	Tehseen	BOL Entertainment
2024	Barat Nahi Aaii	Hoor	Set Entertainment
2024	Tauba	Shazia	Geo Entertainment
2025	Ishq Mubarak	Nasreen	Set Entertainment
2025	Sehan	Seemi	PTV
2025	Ism-e-Yaraan	Tania	Hum TV

=== Web series ===
Year	Title	Role	Network
2023	Mor Chaal	Ramsha	Green Entertainment

=== Film ===
Year	Title	Role
2018	DNC	Mother
2023	Dil Punjabi	Saira
2023	Nageena	Nageena
TBA	Love in London	TBA
