= Nigah =

- Drama Title
- Written by: Seema Ghazal
- Directed by: Abu Al Hassanat
- Starring: Aaminah Haq; Noman Aijaz; Masood Akhtar; Firdous Jamal; Iram Hassan; Farah Hussain; Iqbal Hussain
- Country of origin: Pakistan
- Original language: Urdu

Original release
- Release: May 2002

Nigah (Urdu: نگاہ, lit. 'A Glance') is a Pakistani drama serial, released in mid-2002, which attempts to delve into certain, South Asian socio-cultural mindsets. It fared lukewarm with audiences, and has been criticized for its lack of logic.

== Plot ==
The story revolves around Nigah (Aaminah Haq) and Jawad (Noman Aijaz) who, falling in love soon after their first meeting, plan to get married. The discovery that their fathers (Masood Akhtar and Firdaus Jamal) are old friends appears to make things easier for the couple, but they soon begin to experience problems.

As a wedding gift, Jawad receives a painting of a bride and a groom, and is shocked that the bride in the picture is Nigah. His immediate reaction is doubt, but he then becomes enraged when he begins to think that Nigah is unfaithful. Nigah tries to convince him of her innocence, but he refuses to listen. Things continue to worsen until, after throwing Nigah out of the house, Jawad attempts to start a relationship with his cousin, Shama (Irum Hasan), whom he had earlier rejected. The attempt fails as he still has feelings for Nigah.

The groom in the picture is Daniyal, a wealthy and prosperous businessman. He also experiences problems related to the picture, as the picture with Nigah is published in newspapers by his enemies as soon as he gets engaged to a girl, Aashi. His character, like Nigah's, comes under the shadow of doubt, and he is shattered mentally and emotionally. Through a twist, Daniyal and Nigah meet each other, and set out to solve the mystery of the portrait.

== Reception ==
In 2008, Nigah was repeat-telecasted on PTV Home. The drama was aired from Monday to Friday, for thirty minutes each day, during the Matinee Time show, which re-telecasts quality television serials to provide home, family entertainment.

== Cast ==
- Sahibzada Abdul Sattar
- Mian Ahmed Yar Javed
- Aamina Haq
- Noman Aijaz
- Masood Akhtar
- Firdous Jamal
- Iram Hassan
- Farah Hussain
- Iqbal Hussain
