= Product =

Product may refer to:

== Business ==
- Product (business), an item that can be offered to a market to satisfy the desire or need of a customer
- Product (project management), a deliverable or set of deliverables that contribute to a business solution

== Mathematics ==
- Product (mathematics)
- Capital Pi Notation, an operator often called product that yields the product of a sequence

=== Algebra ===
- Direct product

==== Set theory ====
- Cartesian product of sets

==== Group theory ====
- Direct product of groups
- Semidirect product
- Product of group subsets
- Wreath product
- Free product
- Zappa–Szép product (or knit product), a generalization of the direct and semidirect products

==== Ring theory ====
- Product of rings
- Ideal operations, for product of ideals

==== Linear algebra ====
- Scalar multiplication
- Matrix multiplication
- Inner product, on an inner product space
- Exterior product or wedge product
- Multiplication of vectors:
  - Dot product
  - Cross product
  - Seven-dimensional cross product
  - Triple product, in vector calculus
- Tensor product

=== Topology ===
- Product topology

==== Algebraic topology ====
- Cap product
- Cup product
- Slant product

==== Homotopy theory ====
- Smash product
- Wedge sum (or wedge product)

=== Category theory ===
- Internal product, in a monoidal category
- Product (category theory), a generalization of mathematical products
- Fibre product or pullback
  - Coproduct or pushout

=== Probability theory ===
- Wick product of random variables

=== Graph theory ===
- Graph product

== Music ==
- Product (Brand X album), 1979
- Product (De Press album), 1982
- Product (Sophie album), 2015
- Product, a three-CD compilation set by Buzzcocks

== Other uses ==
- Product (chemistry), the species formed from chemical reactions
- Hairstyling product, such as hairspray or hair gel, generally referred to as simply "product"

== See also ==
- Production (disambiguation)
