= Jana Malik =

Pakistani actress

- Born: Jana Malik; 26 April 1974 (age 52); Lahore, Punjab, Pakistan
- Occupation: actress
- Spouse: Nouman Javaid (m. 2016; div. 2017)

Jana Malik (Urdu: جاناں ملک; born 26 April 1974) is a Pakistani actress who appears in television serials. Jana Malik is also known as Janan or Jana. She is best known for playing the supporting character of Pashi, the snake charmer, in the supernatural series Naagin, which aired on Geo Kahani. She was seen in the television serials Mar Jain Bhi To Kya, Parlour Wali Larki, and Ek Tamanna Lahasil Si and is well known for her lead role in the serial Aiteraaf. She was also part of the cast in the Urdu films Muhafiz, and Zor in 1998.

== Personal life ==
She was born in Lahore on 26 April 1974.

She was married to Nouman Javaid on 2 September 2016. The couple divorced in March 2017.

== Career ==
Jana started her career as an actress in PTV when she was thirteen years old. She made her debut with the serial Reizgar aired on PTV Home. After that, she was seen in Maigh Malhaar and then acted in a children's musical show Aangan Aangan Tarey on PTV. She also appeared in an Urdu language film Muhafiz in 1998 with Nadeem and Saud. She is being seen on different TV channels and in television serials. She played a lead role in Aiteraaf in 2011 on ARY Digital. The next serials in which she starred in include Kis Din Mera Viyah Howay Ga, Ek Tamanna Lahasil Si, Mor Mahal and Marzi. From 2017 to 2019, she starred in Geo Kahani's hit series Naagin.

== Filmography ==
- Muhafiz – 1998
- Zor – 1998

=== Television ===
- Raigzar as Zeno
- Marasim
- Bulandi as Rabi
- Kaanch Kay Par
- Ibn-e-Adam
- Gharoor as Naqsheen
- Landa Bazar
- Muhabbat Yun Bhi Hoti Hai as Eman
- Maigh Malhaar
- Zinnia
- Aangan Aangan Tarey
- Un bayanable
- Mom
- Khawahishon Kay Jugnu
- Aiteraaf
- Kis Din Mera Viyah Howay Ga
- Jo Chale To Jaan Se Guzar Gaye
- Qissa Chaar Darvesh
- Mere Huzoor
- Jahez as Saira
- Topi Drama
- Mar Jain Bhi To Kya
- Ek Tamanna Lahasil Si as Hira
- Adhura Milan
- Dil Se Dil Tak
- Mor Mahal as Shaista
- Parlour Wali Larki as Shehnaz
- Naagin as Pashi (2017–2019)

== Baking career ==
In 2019, Malik started her online bakery named "BakeSpy". After that, Jana completed a diploma in professional patisserie from SCAFA, a cooking school in Lahore.
