= Mehndi (TV series) =

- The opening title screen
- Also known as: Mehndi: The Colour of Emotions
- Genre: Family
- Written by: Seema Ghazal
- Directed by: Muhammad Javed Fazil
- Starring: Aamina Haq; Humayun Saeed; Aisha Uqbah Malik; Amna Hussain; Fiza Ali; Aijaz Aslam; Kamran Jillani; Abid Ali; Jahanara Hai; Tamanna; Qazi Wajid
- Opening theme: "Mehndi ki ye raat" by Jawad Ahmad
- Composer: Waqar Ali
- Country of origin: Pakistan
- Original language: Urdu

Production
- Producers: Jerjees Seja; Shamim Khursheed

Original release
- Network: PTV
- Release: June 2003 – 2003

Mehndi is a 2003 Pakistani television series that revolves around the lives of four young women, each with her own marital problems.

== Plot ==
A couple (Jahanara Hai and Abid Ali) have four daughters: Malaika (Amna Hussain), Sajjal (Ayesha Khan), Alishba (Aamina Haq), and Laiba (Fiza Ali). At the beginning of the series, all four daughters marry on the same day, after which the story follows the difficulties they encounter in their respective marriages.

Laiba has married Aahad (Kamran Jillani) for love, but the couple frequently quarrel and struggle to adjust to married life. Their problems are compounded by Aahad's older sister, with whom Laiba has a difficult relationship. Laiba becomes pregnant but suffers a miscarriage after falling during an argument with her sister-in-law. After learning that they may be unable to conceive again, Laiba and Aahad consider adoption. Despite initial opposition from Aahad's mother, they eventually adopt a child.

Malaika's husband, Taha (Adnan Siddiqui), is financially unstable. He previously worked at the same hospital as Sajjal's husband, Shahzaib, but resigned shortly before his marriage because he was uncomfortable with holding a lower position than Shahzaib. Influenced by his visiting sister-in-law, Taha begins seeking financial assistance from Malaika's father to establish himself. His increasing demands place strain on his marriage to Malaika. Malaika subsequently learns that she was adopted and is the biological daughter of a deceased cousin of Rameez's father. Feeling betrayed by the revelation, she distances herself from her family, further affecting her marriage. She eventually accepts the circumstances of her adoption, while Taha acknowledges his mistakes, and the couple reconcile.

Unlike her sisters, Alishba enters into an arranged marriage with Rameez (Aijaz Aslam). Rameez had been in love with another woman, Ramsha, but married Alishba at the insistence of his parents (Qazi Wajid and Ayesha Khan). He remains conflicted about his former relationship, while Ramsha pressures him to divorce Alishba and return to her. Alishba attempts to preserve the marriage despite Rameez's continued attachment to Ramsha. Rameez ultimately decides that he cannot divorce Alishba and resolves to continue their marriage.

Sajjal is married to her cousin Shahzaib (Humayun Saeed), with whom she has a loving and stable relationship. Sajjal becomes pregnant, but the couple's circumstances change when Shahzaib is diagnosed with cancer. His condition eventually proves fatal, leaving Sajjal widowed while expecting their child. The series ends with Sajjal grieving Shahzaib while preparing for the birth of their child and retaining the memories of their life together.

== Cast ==
- Aamina Haq as Alishba
- Ayesha Khan as Sajjal
- Fiza Ali as Laiba
- Amna Hussain as Malaika
- Humayun Saeed as Shahzaib (Sajjal's husband)
- Aijaz Aslam as Rameez (Alishba's husband)
- Adnan Siddiqui as Taha (Malaika's husband)
- Kamran Jillani as Ahad (laiba's husband)
- Ayesha Khan as Taseem (Rameez's mother)
- Abid Ali as Ali Hassan (daughter's father)
- Jahanara Hai as Sauleha Begum (daughter's mother)
- Tamanna as Janna Bi (daughter's aunt)
- Qazi Wajid as Iqbal (Alishba's father-in-law)

== Soundtrack ==
Mehndi's original title song "Mehndi ki yeh raat" is sung by Jawad Ahmad.

== Awards ==
- Lux Style Awards Best TV Play
- Lux Style Awards Best TV Actor Humayun Saeed
- Lux Style Awards Best TV Actress Aaminah Haq
- Nominated – Lux Style Awards Best TV Actor Abid Ali
