= Main Manto Nahi Hoon =

- Showrunners: Humayun Saeed; Samina Humayun Saeed; Sana Shahnawaz
- Written by: Khalil-ur-Rehman Qamar
- Directed by: Nadeem Baig
- Starring: Sajal Aly; Humayun Saeed; Azaan Sami Khan; Saima Noor; Asif Raza Mir; Babar Ali; Saba Hameed
- Theme music composer: Saad Sultan
- Opening theme: Main Wo To Nahi
- Country of origin: Pakistan
- Original language: Urdu
- No. of episodes: 31

Production
- Production companies: Six Sigma Plus, Next Level Entertainment

Original release
- Network: ARY Digital
- Release: 18 July – 1 November 2025

Main Manto Nahi Hoon is a Pakistani television series, written by Khalil-ur-Rehman Qamar, directed by Nadeem Baig, and co-produced by Humayun Saeed's Six Sigma Plus and Samina Humayun Saeed's Next Level Entertainment. It stars Humayun Saeed as a university professor and Sajal Aly as his student with whom he develops a bond. The ensemble supporting cast consists of Azaan Sami Khan, Saima Noor, Asif Raza Mir, Babar Ali and Saba Hameed. The series premiered on ARY Digital in July 2025.

== Plot ==
The series begins with the intense feud between two powerful gangster families, the Amritsaris and the Bin Yameens, in Lahore. A deep-rooted rivalry was sparked by a tragic incident in the past when Binyamin murdered Siraj's sister, Surayya's two sons, fueling Surayya's desire for vengeance.

Mehmal, Siraj's daughter, is determined to break free from her family's patriarchal norms. She's caught between her loyalty to her family and her desire for graduation. Through her aunt Surayya, her father allows her to study further. She secretly develops feelings for her teacher, Manto, the calm and composed professor of economics with a quiet sense of rebellion.

Meanwhile, Farhad, Binyamin's son, becomes infatuated with Mehmal and will stop at nothing to possess her, including killing his girlfriend, Ifrah. At the birthday party of Manto's colleague and close neighbour, Maria, Farhad feuds with Mehmal but Mehmal slaps her. Manto who had tried to refrain him gets injured slightly. Farhad leaves the party and the Amritsaris learn about his misbehaviour, further intensifying the conflict.

== Cast ==
- Sajal Aly as Mehmal Siraj Amritsari: Siraj & Naseeba's daughter; Shamraiz & Naurez's sister; Mikaal's ex fiancée; Farhad & Zaviyar's love interest.
- Humayun Saeed as Professor Zaviyar Manto: Waqar's son; Mehmal's love interest; Maria's friend.
- Sanam Saeed as Professor Maria Chauhan: Zaviyar's friend & colleague.
- Azaan Sami Khan as Farhad Binyamin: Binyamin & Khadijah's son; Hammad & Madiha's brother; Ifrah's ex boyfriend. (Dead)
- Saima Noor as Surayya Amritsari: Siraj's sister; Binyamin's former love interest.
- Asif Raza Mir as Siraj Amritsari: Naseeba's husband; Surayya's brother; Mehmal, Shamraiz & Naurez's father.
- Babar Ali as Binyamin Kathia: Khadijah's husband; Farhad, Hammad & Madiha's father; Surayya's former love interest.
- Saba Hameed as Khadijah Binyamin: Binyamin's wife; Farhad, Hammad & Madiha's mother.
- Saba Faisal as Naseeba Siraj: Siraj's wife; Mehmal, Shamraiz & Naurez's mother.
- Durab Khalil as Mikaal Hazrat: Mehmal's ex fiance.
- Nameer Khan as Shamraiz Amritsari: Siraj & Naseeba's son; Mehmal & Naurez's brother.
- Musaddiq Malek as Naurez Amritsari: Siraj & Naseeba's son; Mehmal & Shamraiz's brother; Mariyam's husband.
- Hashaam Khan as Hammad Binyamin: Binyamin & Khadijah's son; Farhad & Madiha's brother. (Dead)
- Fatima Amjad as Madiha Binyamin: Binyamin & Khadijah's daughter; Farhad & Hammad's sister.
- Salman Shahid as Mian Jee
- Hajra Yamin as Ifrah: Farhad's ex girlfriend. (Dead)
- Syed Mohammad Ahmed as Ifrah's father
- Usman Peerzada as the University Dean
- Shehryar Zaidi as Hazrat's father (Dead)
- Salma Asim Zafar as Hazrat's mother
- Syed Tanveer as Waqar Manto: Zaviyar's father (Dead)

== Production ==
The development on the series began in late 2021 with Khalil-ur-Rehman Qamar as a writer, Nadeem Baig as a director and Humayun Saeed as the male lead. In June 2023, during his appearance on Mazaaq Raat Qamar cryptically confirmed Aly as the lead of the series. Saima Noor's part was confirmed in December. She earlier declined the role but later agreed when Baig convinced her through her husband Syed Noor. Sanam Saeed was offered the role of Miss Maria Chauhan, which marked her return to a television serial after Deedan (2018–19). Saeed had her reservations about accepting the role due to the writer Qamar, and joined the filming in mid-2024 after finishing her work in Jo Bachay Hain Sang Samait Lo. The role was earlier declined by Mira Sethi, who refused to be a part of the series due to Qamar. Asif Raza Mir was selected to portray the role of Aly's character's father after he clarified that he had no apprehension about working with his former daughter-in-law.

== Reception ==
Social media users criticised the series for its portrayal of student-teacher romance.

=== Critical reception ===
In a review of the first two episodes, Gaitee Ara Siddiqi of The News International noted the direction, screenplay, dialogue and acting performances of the actors, especially of Saima. In a review by Independent Urdu, the series was criticised for the portrayal of romance between student and teacher. A reviewer of the DAWN Images hailed it as the show that he hated to watch.

Regarding the criticism that the series received, producer Sana Shahnawaz remarked to The Khaleej Times that the series' goal was to spark conversation and reflection about society, and the debates and criticisms it received are a sign that it successfully engaged audiences and achieved its intent, rather than aiming for universal approval.
