= Ashiyana (TV series) =

- Genre: Comedy drama Romance
- Created by: Kashif Mehmood
- Written by: Munnoo Bhai
- Directed by: M. Usman, Zulfiqar Ali
- Starring: Qavi Khan; Waseem Abbas; Kashif Mehmood; Maria Wasti; Nighat Butt; Irfan Khoosat; Seemi Zaidi
- Opening theme: Rage
- Composer: Akhter Hussain
- Country of origin: Pakistan
- Original language: Urdu
- No. of seasons: 1
- No. of episodes: 15

Original release
- Network: Pakistan Television Corporation
- Release: 1997

Ashiyana (English: Beautiful Home) (Urdu : ﺁشيانه) is a 1997 Pakistani drama series which was aired on the Pakistan Television network in 1997. The story is about orphan siblings and the challenges they face in their life. Despite their struggles, they manage to make their house into a home full of love and life. The series also highlighted the struggle of those living in rural Pakistan who aspire for a better life by emigrating abroad.

== Cast ==
- Qavi Khan as Wajid Khan
- Irfan Khoosat as Chaudhary Rehmat
- Waseem Abbas as Nouman
- Seemi Zaidi as Sapna
- Maria Wasti as Saima
- Nighat Butt as Zarda
- M. Zubair as Bhai Uncle
- Javed Kodu as Babu
- Kashif Mehmood as Saif
- Shazib Mirza as Chaudhary Nazeer
- Sanam Nazi as Babi Aunty
- Aamna Ahmed as Narmeen
- Mahazaib as Billo
- Zia Khan as Sajid
- Azhar Zaheer as Waqar Uncle
- Amanat Chann as Chand
- Chacha Tufail as Chacha Karmo
- Atiq as Atiq
- Tahir Noushad as Rafiq
- Touqeer Ahmed as Dumb Man
- Imran Islam as Aamir
- Atif Mehmood as Bantoo
- Semal Rehan as Gurya
- Furqan Latif as Waleed
- Nadia Saeed as Alia
- Najma Wasti as Raheela
- Abdulla as Jabbar Mechanic
- Anita Kamfiar as Aya Amma

Rage music band

- Salman
- Ali
- Cristopher
- Ahmer
