= Aaminah Haq =

Pakistani model and actress

- Born: 4 November 1973 (age 52); Lahore, Punjab, Pakistan
- Occupations: Model, actress
- Spouse: Ammar Belal
- Relatives: Hina Rabbani Khar (cousin)
- Modeling information
- Hair color: Black
- Eye color: Brown

Aaminah Haq (Urdu: آمنہ حق, also variously spelled as Aamina Haq and Amna Haq) is a Pakistani model and actress. Haq has modelled for magazines including She, Libas, Visage, Woman's Own, Fashion Collection and Newsline. She also hosted three seasons of Lux Style ki Duniya, and hosted a chat show for Aag TV, called The Aaminah Haq Show. Haq has acted in a number of Urdu TV dramas such as Chaandni Raatain and Ghulam Gardish. She also appeared in the TV drama Mehndi: The Color of Emotions.

== Personal life ==
Aaminah Haq is a cousin of Hina Rabbani Khar, a former Foreign Minister of Pakistan. Haq and fashion designer Ammar Belal were married in 2009.

== Television serials ==
Year	Title	Role	Channel	Notes	Ref
1998	Ghulam Gardish		PTV Home	Classical Hit, written by Asghar Nadeem Syed and directed by Nusrat Thakur	
1999	Sila		PTV World	Memorable, directed by Misbah Khalid	
2002	Nigah	Nigah	PTV Home	Super Hit, written by Seema Ghazal	
2002	Chaandni Raatain	Zarminay	PTV Home	Super Hit, written by Seema Ghazal and directed by Muhammad Javed Fazil	
2002	Singhar		PTV World	Memorable, written by Seema Ghazal and directed by Muhammad Javed Fazil	
2003	Mehndi	Alishba	PTV Home	Super Hit, written by Seema Ghazal and directed by Muhammad Javed Fazil	
2005	Jaye Kahan Yeh Dil		Geo TV	Directed by Anjum Shehzad	

- Aina
- Chupke Chupke
- Doorian
- Aap Jaisa Koi
- Haal e Dil

== Music videos ==
- Fraudiye, by Awaz
- Ankhoon Ko Ankhoon Ne, by Junaid Jamshed
- Channa Ve Channa, by Rahim Shah
- Mahive, by Faakhir
- Dekha, by Ali Zafar
- Chhoo Ke Dekho
- Bohut Garam
- Chal Bullehia, by Mekaal Hasan Band

== Accolades ==
Ceremony	Category	Project	Result
1st Lux Style Awards	Best Model of the Year (female)	N/A	Nominated
2nd Lux Style Awards	Best Television Actress	Singhar	Nominated
2nd Lux Style Awards	Best Model of the Year (female)	N/A	Won
3rd Lux Style Awards	Best Television Actress	Mehndi	Won
3rd Lux Style Awards	Best Model of the Year (female)	N/A	Nominated

== See also ==
- List of Pakistani actresses
