= Boota from Toba Tek Singh =

Pakistani television series

- Genre: Drama
- Written by: Khalil-Ur-Rehman Qamar
- Directed by: Dilawar Malik
- Starring: Faisal Qureshi; Maria Wasti; Farah Shah; Babar Ali
- Country of origin: Pakistan
- Original language: Urdu
- No. of episodes: 22

Original release
- Network: PTV
- Release: 1999 – 1999

Boota from Toba Tek Singh (Urdu: بوٹا فرام ٹوبہ ٹیک سنگھ) is a 1999 Pakistani drama serial aired by Pakistan Television Corporation. The 22-episode Urdu series was written by Khalil-Ur-Rehman Qamar and directed by Dilawar Malik. The drama was highly popular when it first aired in 1999.

== Plot ==
The story centres on Boota (Faisal Qureshi), the only son of a landlord from Toba Tek Singh. Boota is a mischievous young man who struggles academically. His life takes a dramatic turn when he falls in love with Mehru (Farah Shah), whose car breaks down near his village as she and her grandmother (Khursheed Shahid) are traveling to Lahore. Captivated by Mehru, Boota decides to run away from home and heads to Lahore.

Mehru runs an advertising agency and her assistant Faani (Kashif Mehmood) takes Boota to the boarding house of Zohra Khatoon (Deeba) where he lives. Meeru (Babar Ali) is a fellow resident there who belongs to a broken home and hence has a shattered personality. He makes false promises to girls and then blackmails them after he gets their photos and letters.

Mehru loves him and tries to reason with him. Meeru falls in love with Mehru too but is afraid to admit it because he does not want to be in a position where someone else can exploit him.

This play was quite popular at that time (1999).

== Cast ==
- Faysal Qureshi as Boota
- Maria Wasti as Zulekha
- Babar Ali as Meeru
- Mishi Khan as Zoya
- Kashif Mehmood as Fani
- Farah Shah as Mehru
- Naima Khan as Sarwat Begum
- Khalil-ur-Rehman Qamar as Shoukat Hussain
- Deeba as Zohra Khatoon
- Khursheed Shahid as Mehru's Grandmother
- Nighat Butt as Boota's Mother
- Khalid Butt as Boota's Father
- Mahmood Aslam as Kanwar Surkhab
- Dilawar Malik as Deenoo
- Farah Tufail as Saima
- Afshan Qureshi as Sara
- Azhar Rangeela as Jeera
- Shahzada Ghaffar as Koudu
- Imran Ashraf
