= Neelum Kinaray =

Pakistani television series

- Original title: ur
- Genre: Romantic drama; Serial drama
- Written by: Amna Mufti
- Directed by: Adnan Wai Qureshi
- Country of origin: Pakistan
- Original language: Urdu
- No. of episodes: 15

Production
- Producers: Momina Duraid; Mehroz Karim
- Production location: Banjosa lake Kashmir
- Camera setup: Multi-camera setup
- Production company: MD Productions

Original release
- Network: Hum TV
- Release: 8 September – 15 December 2015

Neelum Kinaray (Urdu: نیلم کنارے, lit. 'On the edge of the Neelum'), is a 2015 Pakistani television drama series that aired on Hum TV. It was produced by Mehroz Karim and Momina Duraid under MD Productions, directed by Adnan Wai Qureshi and written by Amna Mufti. It starred Ushna Shah, Gohar Mumtaz, Sumbul Iqbal, and Affan Waheed.

== Plot ==
Sakina is portrayed as an orphan girl raised by her uncle Aslam Butt aunt after the death of her mother as her father left. She is disliked by her aunt Appu Ji, but her cousin Ijaz helps her and whom she loves. Despite Appu Ji's opposition, Aslam fixes Ijaz's marriage with Sakina. Ijaz goes abroad for a better job and admits Sakina to a college. Ijaz's cousin Laraib, who wanted to marry Ijaz, takes full advantage of this opportunity and casts doubt on Ijaz's heart against Sakina when Ijaz's friend Yaseen comes to their house.

== Cast ==
- Ushna Shah as Sakina: Ijaz's cousin and eventual wife
- Gohar Mumtaz as Ijaz: Sakina's husband
- Sumbal Iqbal as Laraib: Ijaz's cousin
- Affan Waheed as Yaseen: Ijaz's friend
- Samina Peerzada as Zainab "Appu Ji": Ijaz's mother
- Naeem Tahir as Aslam Butt: Ijaz's father
- Nargis Rasheed as Safia: Laraib's mother
- Khalid Butt as Laraib's father: Laraib's father
- Ayub Khoso as Riaz: a professor Sakina stayed with
- Kashif Mehmood as Jabbar: Prof. Riaz's servant
- Tanveer Abbas

== Soundtrack ==
Zeb Bangash performed the original soundtrack of the series, lyrics by Sabir Zafar, and music composition by Shani Arshad.

== Production ==
The production location of the series was Neelum Valley, Kashmir. The script was written by 2014 Lux Style Award winner, Amna Mufti.
