= Shah Fahad =

Pakistani theatre and television actor

- Born: 17 March 1990 (age 36); Peshawar, Pakistan
- Education: FAST NUCES Lahore
- Occupations: Actor, writer, director, drama educator
- Years active: 2012–present
- Organization: DramaEd
- Known for: Television, theatre, DramaEd, Pakistan Tehreek e Comedy
- Notable work: Mor Mahal; Aakhri Station; Social Pagal; Rahu and Ketu

Shah Fahad (born 17 March 1990) is a Pakistani theatre and television actor, writer, director and drama educator. He has been a part of more than 50 theatrical productions and more than 20 screen productions. He has also founded DramaEd and Pakistan Tehreek e Comedy. He generally plays mythological, supporting and villainous roles in television serials.

He is known for his television roles as Nawab Shujaat Jehan in Mor Mahal and as Sajjad in Aakhri Station.

== Early life and education ==
Shah Fahad studied Electrical Engineering at FAST NUCES Lahore. During his university years, he was involved in theatre activities, including work with university drama and cultural societies.

== Theatre career ==
Shah Fahad has worked extensively in theatre as an actor, writer, director and producer. His theatre credits include productions such as Dracula, Date Night, Rahu and Ketu, Social Pagal, Hua Kuch Yun, Sultana Daku, The Crucible, Frankenstein, Harry Potter and the Cursed Child, and The Play That Goes Wrong.

He has produced and participated in more than 50 stage productions since 2012.

== Drama education and comedy ==
Shah Fahad founded DramaEd, an initiative focused on theatre education, training, playwriting and performance development.

He is also associated with Pakistan Tehreek e Comedy, a platform focused on comedy performances, sketches and improvisational theatre.

== Filmography ==
=== Television ===
| Year | Title | Role | Network | Additional Notes |
|---|---|---|---|---|
| 2018 | Aakhri Station | Sajjad | ARY Digital | |
| 2016 | Mor Mahal | Nawab Shujaat Jehan | Geo Entertainment; PTV Home | |
| 2016 | Shaam Dhaley | Adeel | Geo Entertainment | |
| 2018 | Mohini Mansion Ki Cinderellayain | Maulvi | Bol Entertainment | |
| 2022 | Jo Bichar Gaye | | Geo Entertainment | |

== Awards ==
Shah Fahad's professional profile lists recognition in theatre competitions, including awards for acting, writing and productions at university theatre festivals.
