= Kashif Mehmood =

Pakistani television actor

- کاشف محمود
- Born: 4 August 1971 (age 54); Lahore, Punjab, Pakistan
- Occupations: Actor; Producer
- Years active: 1993 – present

Kashif Mehmood (Punjabi, Urdu: کاشف محمود) is a Pakistani television actor, producer, and occasional film performer. Active since the early 1990s, he is known for his work in socially conscious drama serials and for his outspoken political commentary in public forums.

== Early and personal life ==
Kashif Mehmood was born in Lahore, Pakistan, where he also began his acting career in 1993.

In late 2025, Mehmood publicly celebrated a major personal milestone when his middle son, Muhammad Aban Kashif, completed the memorization of the Qur’an and earned the title of Hafiz-e-Qur’an.

== Career ==
Mehmood spent his early years in the television industry working as a background extra, often appearing silently in scenes with his back to the camera.

His breakthrough role came with the acclaimed drama Aashiyana (1997), which he also co-produced. According to Mehmood, he mortgaged his mother's jewellery and took out personal loans to fund the project. Although the original broadcaster collapsed before the show aired, it was eventually picked up by PTV, where it became a success. Mehmood was able to repay all debts and even save approximately ₨ 700,000.

His other notable television dramas include Boota from Toba Tek Singh (1999), Landa Bazar (2002), Moorat (2004), and Inkaar (2019).

== Political views and legal issues ==
Kashif Mehmood is known for speaking candidly on political and social issues in Pakistan. In December 2024, he was briefly detained during an anti-government protest in Lahore.

== Filmography ==
=== Television series ===
Year	Title	Role	Network	Notes
1993	Zaroorat		PTV	
1993	Pehli Barish		PTV	
1997	Ashiyana	Saif	PTV	Also producer
1999	Boota from Toba Tek Singh	Fani	PTV	
1999	Bulandi		PTV	
2000	Marasim		PTV	
2000	Haqeeqat		PTV	
2001	Tum Yehi Kehna	Dudu	PTV	
2002	Landa Bazaar	Jajji Rungbaaz	PTV	
2003	Achanak	Dudu	PTV	
2004	Sawan		PTV	
2004	Hera Pheri and Company	Zulfi	PTV	
2004	Dil Lagi	Kashif	PTV	
2004	Patal		PTV	
2004	Moorat	Eunuch Babar	ARY Digital	
2005	Chori Chori		PTV	
2005	Khawab Ngar		PTV	
2005	Aandhi		PTV	
2005	Nizam	Jabru	ATV	
2006	Lagan		PTV	
2006	Barson Baad		PTV	
2006	Sath Nibhana Hai		PTV	
2006	Rent A Bhoot		PTV	
2012	Bilqees Kaur	Inayat	Hum TV	
2012	Kahani Aik Raat Ki		ARY Digital	
2014	Digest Writer	Ayaan Junaid	Hum TV	
2016	Mannat		Geo TV	
2017	Naagin	King Salaaj	Geo Kahani	
2017	Neelum Kinaray	Jabbar	Hum TV	
2017	Is Chand Pe Dagh Nahin	Ghaybat	A-Plus TV	
2017	Laal Ishq	Ejaz "Jajji"	A-Plus TV	
2018	Zun Mureed		Hum TV	
2018	Mazung De Meena Sheena		TV ONE	
2018	Bay Dardi	Nasir	ARY Digital	
2018	Ranjha Ranjha Kardi	Nusrat Mian	Hum TV	
2019	Bhool	Rashid	ARY Digital	
2019	Pakeeza Phoopho		ARY Digital	
2019	Resham Gali Ki Husna	Husna's father	Hum TV	
2020	Dushman e Jaan	Aqeel Gardezi	ARY Digital	
2020	Tum Ho Wajah	Muraad	Hum TV	
2020	Qurbatein	Waaris	Hum TV	
2021	Dil Na Umeed To Nahi	Sherwani Sahab	TV One	
2021	Ishq Jalebi	Sadaqat "Saqi"	Geo Entertainment	
2021	Juda Huay Kuch Is Tarha	Najeeb	Hum TV	
2022	Thori Sazish Thori Mudakhlat	Nawab Inayatullah Khan	Hum TV	Telefilm
2022	Dil Awaiz	Nawab Shahbuddin	Geo Entertainment	
2022	Qalandar		Geo Entertainment	
2023	Heer Da Hero	Hamid Jutt	Geo Entertainment	
2023	Jeevan Nagar	Shabaan	Green Entertainment	
2024	Mehroom	Zahid	Geo Entertainment	

=== Films ===
Year	Title
2014	Sultanat

== Awards and nominations ==
Year	Award	Category	Work	Result	Ref(s)
2012	Lux Style Awards	Best Television Actor – Terrestrial	Love, Life Aur Lahore	Nominated	
