= Ek Tamanna Lahasil Si =

- Genre: Romance; Drama
- Written by: Wasi Shah
- Directed by: Syed Atif Hussain
- Starring: Fahad Mustafa; Mawra Hocane; Jana Malik; Hassan Niazi
- Theme music composer: Farrukh Abid
- Opening theme: Ek Tamanna Lahasil Si by Sanam Marvi
- Country of origin: Pakistan
- Original language: Urdu
- No. of episodes: 23

Production
- Producer: Humayun saeed: Shehzad Naseeb
- Production location: Karachi
- Running time: 40 min
- Production company: Six Sigma Plus

Original release
- Network: Hum TV
- Release: 3 October 2012 – 20 February 2013

Ek Tamanna Lahasil Si (lit: A futile desire) is a 2012 Pakistani drama serial directed by Syed Atif Hussain and written by Wasi Shah. The serial was first aired on 3 October 2012 on Hum TV. It stars Fahad Mustafa, Jana Malik, Hassan Niazi, Mawra Hocane, Humayun Ashraf, Babar Khan and Saba Hameed.

The series was also aired in India on Zindagi TV channel.

== Plot ==
Nadia is invited to her cousin Hira's wedding. She marries her cousin Mohsin and is abused by her husband and mother-in-law. But her brother-in-law, Ahsan, supports her a lot. She goes crazy when she is not allowed to leave the house with her father-in-law for her mother's funeral. She is pregnant with a baby, which her husbands says is not his. Her husband kills his boss for firing him and is jailed and sentenced to death; he is hanged soon after, but before being hanged he apologizes for what he did and admits that the baby is his. She gives birth to a baby boy and later marries her other cousin. Her terrible mother-in-law loses her sanity after her son is hanged.

== Cast ==
- Fahad Mustafa as Mohsin
- Mawra Hocane as Nadia
- Saba Hameed as Ruqaiyya
- Jana Malik as Hira
- Hassan Niazi as Ali
- Saba Faisal
- Salma Shaheen
- Farah Nadeem as Anuma
- Qaiser Naqvi as Rukiya
- Humayoun Ashraf as Shehzaad
- Babar Khan as Ehsan
- Sarah Razi
- Shahzad Malik
- Kulsoom Malik

== See also ==
- List of programmes broadcast by Zindagi TV
- List of programs broadcast by Hum TV
- List of Pakistani television serials
