= Tau Dil Ka Kia Hua =

Pakistani television series

- From left to right: Hajra Yamin, Mansha Pasha, Sami Khan, Ayeza Khan, Noor Khan, Imran Ashraf, Hira Hussain, Zahid Ahmed
- Urdu: تو دل کا کیا ہوا
- Genre: Drama; Romance; Revenge
- Written by: Khalil-ur-Rehman Qamar
- Directed by: Shahid Shafat
- Creative director: Wajahat Ullah (Waji) Khan
- Starring: Ayeza Khan; Sami Khan; Mansha Pasha; Zahid Ahmed; Imran Ashraf; Hira Hussain; Hajra Yamin; Farah Shah; Noor Khan
- Original language: Urdu
- No. of episodes: 28

Production
- Producers: Sana Shahnawaz; Samina Humayun Saeed; Tariq Shah
- Production company: Next Level Productions

Original release
- Network: Hum TV
- Release: 2 July 2017 – 18 February 2018

Related
- Sammi; Ishq Tamasha

Tau Dil Ka Kia Hua (lit. So What Became of the Heart?) is a Pakistani television series aired on 2 July 2017 on Hum TV replacing Sammi. It stars an ensemble cast including Zahid Ahmed, Sami Khan, Ayeza Khan, Mansha Pasha, Imran Ashraf and Hajra Yamin in leads. The series ended on 18 February 2018.

Written by Khalil-ur-Rehman Qamar, the serial is directed by Shahid Shafat. It is produced by Sana Shahnawaz, Samina Humayun Saeed and Tariq Shah in Next Level Productions.

== Plot ==
Sarwat Chawala is married to Sanuaber and is having an affair with Ateeqa and has betrayed both women. He left Ateeqa when he discovers that she is pregnant. Sanauber learned of this betrayal and she set their house afire, burning herself. After Sanauber's death, Sarwat is upset and kills himself, but before dying, he asks his brother Siraj to take care of his one-year-old son Faris (Sanauber's son) as well as Ateeqa's child who has not yet been born. He also requests Siraj to marry Ateeqa. Siraj, despite being in love with Zulekha, marries Ateeqa and respects his brother's last wish. But Ateeqa tells Siraj to leave Faris as she does not want to raise him. Siraj did not want to abandon his one year old nephew. Ateeqa, infuriated, leaves for South Africa and begins an affair with an Indian man. Ateeqa gives birth to a boy she names Saif and after his birth, Ateeqa gets divorced from Siraj and marries an Indian man and settles in South Africa. Saif lives a horrible childhood and he believes that he is Siraj's son (but the truth is that his father was Sarwat and Siraj is his uncle). He wants to ruin Siraj for leaving him so he comes to Pakistan and starts to spoil Faris' marriage by starting an affair with Faris' wife Maya. Saif knows that Siraj loves Faris a lot so he wants to hirt Faris in order to hurt Siraj. Maya asks Faris for a divorce which he gives, but Faris is deeply shattered. Saif does not actually love Maya. He is in love with his mother's relative's daughter Lubna. In fact, Lubna and Saif have been engaged since childhood. When Maya discovers this, she is shattered and she once again falls in love with Faris and wants to get him back at any cost. But Faris has gotten over with her and is falling in love with Maya's younger sister Zoya.

== Cast ==
- Ayeza Khan as Maya, Faris' ex-wife, Tipu's ex-wife, Naamdaar's elder daughter, Zoya's sister
- Sami Khan as Faris Chawala: Siraj's nephew, Saif's half-brother
- Zahid Ahmed as Saif Chawala and Sarwat Chawala (double role)
- Mansha Pasha as Dariya, Faris' childhood best friend
- Noor Khan as Zoya, Maya's younger sister
- Imran Ashraf as Tipu, Maya's second ex-husband
- Hajra Yamin as Lubna, Saif's fiancée
- Hira Hussain as Muzna
- Rehan Sheikh as Faris' uncle
- Usman Peerzada as Maya's father
- Behroze Sabzwari as Muzna's father
- Seemi Pasha as Muzna's mother
- Farah Shah as Maya's mother
- Hajra Khan as Maya and Lubna's friend and lawyer
