= Shaam Dhaley =

- Genre: Family drama Romantic drama
- Created by: Babar Javed
- Written by: Shomaila Zaki and Abeer Mahar
- Directed by: Nadia Afgan
- Starring: Usman Peerzada; Fiza Ali; Marjan Fatima; Wajeha Khan Durani; Nadia Afgan
- Country of origin: Pakistan
- Original language: Urdu
- No. of seasons: 01
- No. of episodes: 22

Production
- Producer: Babar Javed
- Camera setup: Multi-camera setup
- Running time: 40 Minutes

Original release
- Network: Geo Entertainment
- Release: 24 April – 3 September 2016

Shaam Dhaley (Urdu: شام ڈھلے, lit. 'At Sunset') is a Pakistani drama serial that first aired on Geo Entertainment on 24 April 2016. It is produced by Babar Javed. It airs every Saturday at 7:00.pm on Geo Entertainment. Marjan Fatima and Wajeha Khan Durani play the Female Protagonists in the Serial while Usman Peerzada, Shah Fahad and Fiza Ali play Supporting Characters.

== Synopsis ==
Alina’s life becomes more about protecting her mother and her sisters after her father’s death. But when she finds that her deceased father has also left her to deal with a brother she never knew— the last thing she wanted was losing her own house. Her life meets new complications when she finds that her father has left the house in the name of her brother.

Initially it doesn’t seem like an issue but trouble arises when their sister-in-law, Saima, comes into the picture. The only issue Saima has with her in-laws is the closeness Alina has with her brother Adeel. But Alina has bigger things on her mind— which is to take care of her sisters and her mother.

Mariam and Shanzay aren’t settling well in life. During this difficult time, Saima shows her true colors and teams up with the family attorney (Majid) to throw the family out of their own house in Khizer’s absence. As planned, Majid makes life difficult for Alina and her family. Stuck with a bitter reality, Alina stands up to every problem.

== Cast ==
- Usman Peerzada as Daud
- Marjan Fatima as Alina
- Wajeha Khan Durani as Mariam
- Parveen Malik as Sultana
- Shah Fahad as Adil
- Nadia Afgan as Alina
- Taimoor Khan Niazi as Khizer
- Rashid Mehmood
- Haris Waheed as Faizan
- Fiza Ali as Saima
- Khalid Butt
- Mehreen Bari as Shanzay
- Aqeel Nasir Khan as Majid

== See also ==
- Geo TV
- List of Pakistani television series
- List of programs broadcast by Geo Entertainment
