= Love, Life Aur Lahore =

Pakistani television series

- Intertitle
- Written by: Khalil-ur-Rehman Qamar
- Directed by: Muhammad Usman Zulfiqar Ali (till July 2012); Sohail Iftikhar Khan (from July 2012 - April 2013)
- Starring: Sami Khan; Fiza Ali; Moammar Rana; Shamil Khan; Saleem Sheikh; Faizan Khawaja; Farhana Maqsood; Kiran Haq; Khalid Butt
- Opening theme: Jawad Ahmad
- Country of origin: Pakistan
- Original languages: Urdu; Punjabi
- No. of episodes: 416

Production
- Producer: Zahid Mian
- Editors: Nadeem Abbas; Yasir Iqbal

Original release
- Network: A-Plus; Atv
- Release: 2010 – 7 April 2013

Love, Life aur Lahore (Urdu: لو لائف اور لاہور, lit. 'Love, life and Lahore') is a Pakistani soap opera which aired on A-Plus. Written by Khalil-ur-Rehman Qamar, it has Fiza Ali and Sami Khan in the lead roles while Sami was later replaced by Moammar Rana. It became one of the longest-running soap series in the history of Pakistani television, running for almost three years until its end in April 2013.

Reruns aired on ATV in Pakistan; in UAE and India, the show was aired by B4U Network on B4U Plus.

== Plot ==
It is based on the unfulfilled love story of old Waris Ali & his beloved Hindu girl Gaitri, who were separated at the time of the independence of Pakistan in 1947. The heartwarming tale continues after 62 years tunneling through emotions, cultural divide, and the human need to love & be loved.

The story revolves around a man named Pari paiker (Sami Khan) and his childhood love Lubna Hameed (Fiza Ali) and their love story. Pari paiker and Lubna Hameed both have an unmatched chemistry which causes them frustration till the end and Lubna killed by tuba mangeter in the end for separation of Pari paiker from their mohalla.

== Cast ==
- Sami Khan/Moammar Rana as Pari Paiker
- Fiza Ali as Lubna Hameed
- Faizan Khawaja
- Shamil Khan
- Shafqat Cheema
- Iftikhar Thakur
- Kashif Mehmood
- Nayyar Ejaz
- Ali Anjum
- Farhana Maqsood
- Yasmeen Haq
- Laiba Khan
- Asma Abbas
- Khalid Butt
- Jiya Ali
- Kamran Mujahid
- Ashraf Ali
- Muhsin Gillani
- Shahista Jabeen
- M Naeem Kashmiri
- Moshin Gillani
- Ali Tabish
- Bilal Chaudary
- Dilawer Ahmed
- Zainab Ahmed

== Movie adaptation ==
The soap serial was also later adapted into a movie Kaaf Kangana in 2019 the script of which was also penned by Khalil-ur-Rehman Qamar. Sami Khan and Fiza Ali respired their roles from the serial while Sami also played the same lead character as in serial.

== Accolades ==
=== 12th Lux Style Awards ===
- Best TV Actor-Kashif Mehmood-Nominated
- Best TV Actress-Fiza Ali-Nominated
