= Farah Shah =

Pakistani actress

Farah Shah فرح شاہ
- Born: Farah Shah; 4 December 1972 (age 53); Lahore, Punjab, Pakistan
- Occupations: Actress, model, presenter
- Years active: 1999–present

Farah Shah is a Pakistani television actress and former model. She made her acting debut with the role of Mehru in PTV World's classic series Boota From Toba Tek Singh (1999). Shah's career spans more than 20 years. She worked in various hits on Urdu Television including Landa Bazar (2002), Chashman (2006), Khuda Aur Muhabbat (2011), Numm (2013), Gul-e-Rana (2015), Choti Si Zindagi (2016), Toh Dil Ka Kiya Hua (2017), and Suno Chanda (2018). Her performance as the antagonist in Mohabbat Subh Ka Sitara Hai (2013) and Abro (2016) earned her a nomination for Hum Award in a negative role category. She has played the role of Naeema in Hum TV's Suno Chanda 2.

== Career ==
Entering showbiz at a young age, Shah became a host on a Lollywood music countdown program Yehi To Hai Lollywood. She then pursued acting, with Boota from Toba Tek Singh being one of her earliest appearances in TV drama. In 2018, she made a cameo appearance in Angeline Malik's social initiative Inkaar Karo to raise awareness about women's empowerment in Pakistan.

== Television ==
Year	Title	Role	Airing Network	Notes
1999	Boota from Toba Tek Singh	Mehru	PTV World	
2000	Chamak	Sharmeen	PTV Home	
2000	Jeevan	Nancy	PTV Home	
2001	Duniya Dari	Fauzia	PTV Home	
2002	Landa Bazar	Zohra	PTV Home	
2006	Mr. & Misses	Sara	PTV Home	
2006	Chashman	Chashman	PTV Home	
2006	Partition Aik Safar		Geo TV	
2009	Barish Kay Aansoo	Sophia	Geo TV	
2010	Chunri	Faizaan	PTV Home	
2011	Khuda Aur Muhabbat	Abrina	Geo TV	
2011	Main Mar Gai Shaukat Ali	Surraya	A-Plus TV	
2012	Sabz Qadam		ARY Digital	
2012	Shehryar Shehzadi	Shaista	Urdu 1	
2013	Aseerzadi	Yasmeen	Hum TV	
2013	Numm	Amtul Jahangir Bakht	Geo TV	
2013-2014	Khwab Tabeer	Durdana	PTV Home	
2014	Bhabhi		ARY Digital	
2014	Bhool		Hum TV	
2014	Mohabat Subh Ka Sitara Hai	Romaisa's Khala	Hum TV	
2015	Tamasha	Amna Ahmed	Hum TV	Telefilm
2015	Goya		ARY Digital	
2015	Tumse Mil Kay	Humayun's mother	ARY Digital	
2015	Mumkin	Nageen	ARY Digital	
2015	Kaanch Ki Guriya		Geo TV	
2015–2016	Gul-e-Rana	Shahida	Hum TV	
2015–2016	Abro	Farzana	Hum TV	
2016	Jithani	Sheyla	Hum TV	
2016	Bechari Mehrunnisa		Geo TV	
2016	Khwab Saraye	Salma	Hum TV	
2016	Deewana	Amdun	Hum TV	
2016	Ghayal	Hadia's Mother	ARY Digital	
2016	Piyari Bittu	Ruksana	Express TV	
2016	Choti Si Zindagi	Zubaida Irfan	Hum TV	
2016	Sila	Nargis	Hum TV	
2016	Kitni Girhain Baqi Hain 2	Various	Hum TV	Anthology series, appeared in Episode 4, 9, 14
2017	Toh Dil Ka Kia Hua	Maya's Mother	Hum TV	
2017	Mere Ajnabi	Rabia	ARY Digital	
2017	Rishta Baraye Farokht	Safdar's Mother	HUM Tv	
2017	Adhoora Bandhan	Sarwat	Geo TV	
2018	Thays	Zehra	A-Plus TV	
2018	Umm-e-Haniya	Zeenat	Geo TV	
2018	Ustani Jee	Shaista	Hum TV	Episode 6
2018	Suno Chanda	Naeema Nazakat Ali	Hum TV	
2018	Rashk	Kubra	Express TV	
2019	Kaisa Hai Naseeban	Sofia	ARY Digital	
2019	Bandish	Sumbul	ARY Digital	
2019	Do Tola Pyar	Naseema	Play Entertainment TV	
2019	Choti Choti Batain	Salma	Hum TV	Episode 1–4
2019	Suno Chanda 2	Naeema Nazakat Ali	Hum TV	
2020	Prem Gali	Haseena	ARY Digital	

== Awards and nominations ==
Year	Award	Work	Category	Result	Ref(s).
2001	PTV World Award	Yehi Tau Hai Lollywood	Best Host	Won	
2014	Hum Award	Mohabat Subh Ka Sitara Hai	Best Actor in a Negative Role	Nominated	
2016	Hum Award	Abro	Best Actor in a Negative Role	Nominated	
2020	Pakistan International Screen Awards	Suno Chanda	Best Television Actress in Comedy role	Nominated	
