= Hazaron Raaste =

Pakistani television series

- ہزاروں راستے
- Genre: Drama
- Written by: Mustansar Hussain Tarar
- Directed by: Rashid Dar
- Starring: Abid Ali; Zaib Rehman; Rubina Ashraf; Aurangzeb Leghari; Firdous Jamal; Waseem Abbas
- Country of origin: Pakistan
- Original language: Urdu
- No. of seasons: 1
- No. of episodes: 13

Production
- Producer: Rashid Dar

Original release
- Network: PTV
- Release: 1986 – 1986

Hazaron Raaste (Urdu: ہزاروں راستے; transl. A Thousand Ways) is a 1986 Pakistani television drama serial written by Mustansar Hussain Tarar and adapted from his novel of the same name. Produced and directed by Rashid Dar for Pakistan Television Corporation, the serial ran for 13 episodes.

The serial is built around the affairs of a morally compromised businessman and the intersecting lives of his family and an upright civil servant's household. It was a critical success on its first broadcast, winning Tarar and lead actor Abid Ali Nigar Awards in 1986 for Best Writer and Best Actor respectively.

== Plot ==
Murad Khan (Abid Ali) is a wealthy businessman who has built his fortune through a mixture of legitimate enterprise and illicit dealings, assisted by his secretary Taimoor (Aurangzeb Leghari). From his first marriage he has three children: Abida (Veena Alam), who is married to Yusuf against her father's wishes; Nazuk (Lalarukh Hameed), a medical student known for her forthright opinions; and Adil, a sensitive and withdrawn young man (Firdous Jamal). His second wife Saira (Zaib Rehman) brings with her a son from her previous marriage, Haider, who at one point attempts to kill Murad Khan. Running parallel to Murad Khan's household is the family of Qadir Hussain, an upright civil servant whose daughter Mishal (Rubina Ashraf) becomes drawn into the wider story.

== Cast ==
- Abid Ali as Murad Khan
- Zaib Rehman as Saira
- Rubina Ashraf as Mishal Qadir
- Aurangzeb Leghari as Taimoor
- Firdous Jamal as Adil Murad
- Waseem Abbas as Zubair Qadir
- Ismael Shah as Haider
- Lalarukh Hameed as Nazuk
- Nighat Butt as Phuppo
- Irfan Khoosat as Boota Khan
- Munawar Saeed as Qadir Hussain
- Albela as Maqsood
- Asim Bukhari as the doctor
- Tasneem Kausar as Ahmed Khan's mother
- Altaf-ur-Rehman as Shareef
- Pervaiz Raza as Yusuf
- Alia Begum as Amma
- Peeran Kooper as Loosi Herry Sun
- Khalid Usman as Shakir
- Veena Alam as Abida Faraz
- Lateefi as Baba
- Faiza Hasan as Sham
- Asif Seemab as Naveed
- Jazba Sultan as the doctor
- C. M. Munir as the doctor

== Source material ==
The serial is adapted from Tarar's Urdu-language novel Hazaron Raaste, which has been reissued in book form by Pakistani publishers and is also available in digital form through the Urdu literary archive Rekhta.

== Accolades ==
Awards and nominations for Hazaron Raaste
Year	Award	Category	Recipient	Result	Ref.
1986	Nigar Award	Best Actor	Abid Ali	Won	
1986	Nigar Award	Best Writer	Mustansar Hussain Tarar	Won	
