= Zaib Rehman =

Pakistani film actress

- زیب رحمان
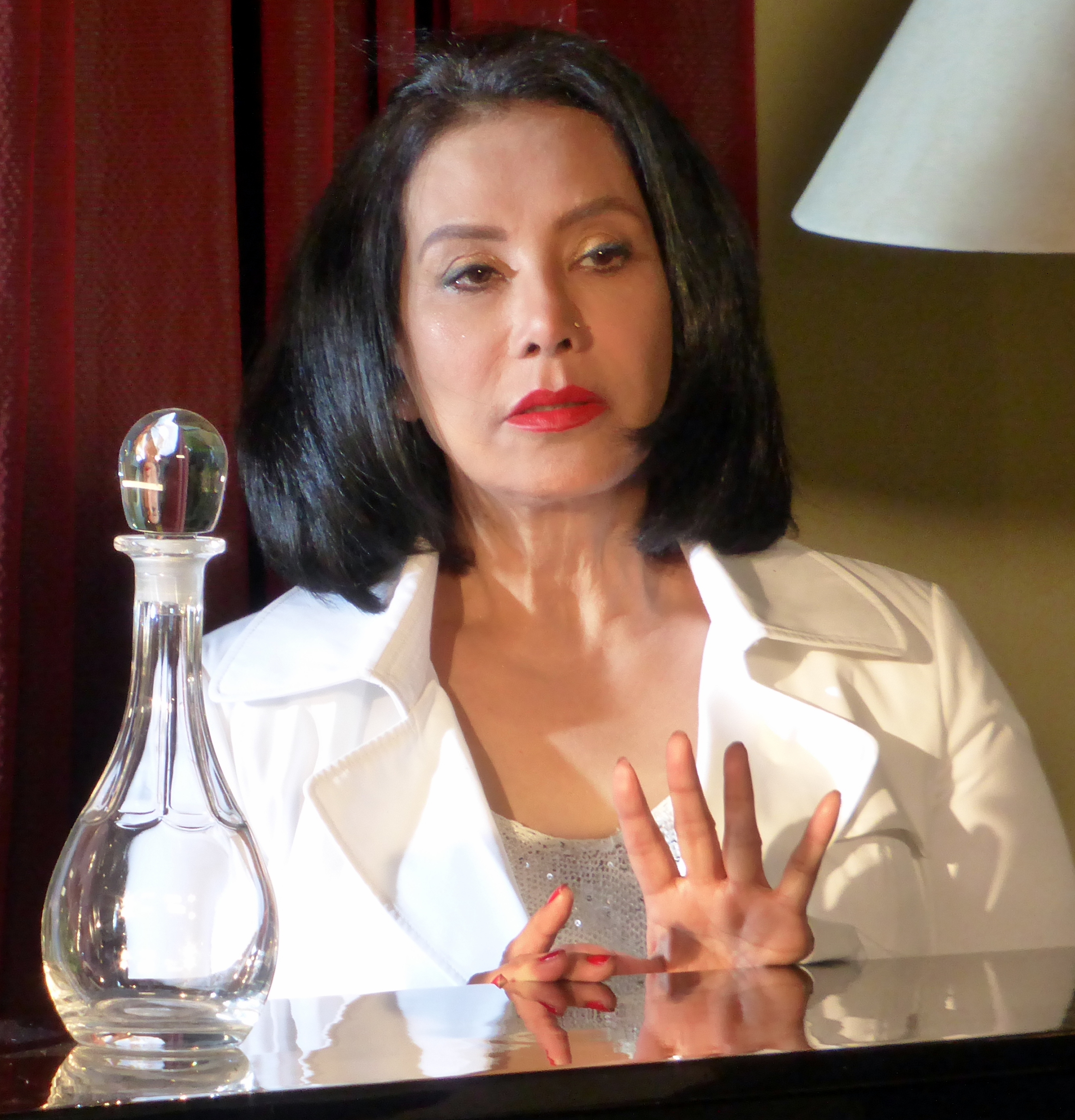
- Zaib Rehman in Istanbul on set of the movie Hijrat.
- Born: Zaib Rehman; 26 April 1959 (age 67); Bahawalpur, Punjab, Pakistan
- Education: Lahore College for Women University
- Occupations: Lawyer; Actress
- Years active: 1975–present
- Children: 2

Zaib Rehman is a Pakistani lawyer and actress. She was one of the most popular actresses of the 1970s, 1980s and 1990s. She started acting in television dramas in her early teens and made her movie debut in the 2011 Shoaib Mansoor blockbuster Bol.

== Early life ==
During her time as student at Lahore College for Women University, she acted as President of the Dramatic Society and completed a National Guard training. She achieved many prizes in inter-college debating competitions. In 1975, she also performed in the annual production of the play Phandy.

== Career ==
Rehman began her television career with Pakistan Television Corporation (PTV). In a 2010 interview, she described Shikayatein Hikayatein, written by Bano Qudsia, as her first television assignment. She became known for her work in PTV dramas of the 1980s, including Andhera Ujala, Ragon Mein Andhera, Shikayatein Hikayatein and other plays. She also worked with television directors including Muhammad Nisar Hussain, Yawar Hayat, Ayub Khawar and Rashid Dar.

After a break from acting, Rehman returned to screen work with Shoaib Mansoor's film Bol, which marked her feature-film debut. Her performance as the mother in the film received critical notice; The Times of India described her as "compelling". She later appeared in Farouq Mengal's film Hijrat as Murad's mother.

In 2016, Rehman returned to television with the Geo TV serial Mannat. The News International reported that the serial marked her return to television after a 25-year gap. She subsequently appeared in Piyari Bittu, Ranjha Ranjha Kardi, Aangan and Qissa Meherbano Ka. In Ranjha Ranjha Kardi, she played Amma Jannatay; Dawn described it as "yet another powerful role" after her comeback. Her performance in Aangan was also noted by Dawn Images, which described her performance as Malkin as "compelling".

In 2021, Rehman appeared in Qissa Meherbano Ka. She also appeared in the ZEE5/Zindagi web series Dhoop Ki Deewar, written by Umera Ahmed and directed by Haseeb Hasan. In 2024, she appeared in Green Entertainment's DuniyaPur.

== Other work ==
In addition to acting, Rehman is a lawyer and entrepreneur. In a 2010 interview, she was described as holding an LLM from the University of the Punjab and as the chief executive officer of Memaar Associates. The same interview stated that she had dubbed characters played by Irene Papas in the Urdu versions of The Message and Lion of the Desert.

== Personal life ==
Rehman was married to writer, actor and playwright Dr Enver Sajjad. Sajjad passed away in 2019. She has two daughters, Ayesha and Priya.

== Filmography ==
=== Television series ===
| Year | Title | Role | Network |
|---|---|---|---|
| 1983 | Nangey Paon | Dilaram Begum | PTV |
| 1983 | Shikayatein Hikayatein | Zareen | PTV |
| 1983 | Ragon Mein Andhera | Sara | PTV |
| 1984 | Andhera Ujala | Neeli | PTV |
| 1985 | Ghar Say Niklay | Bahu | PTV |
| 1985 | Asaan Se Baat | Sahti | PTV |
| 1985 | Umeed-e-Bahar | Naila | PTV |
| 1986 | Khwabon Ka Jungle | Madiha | PTV |
| 1986 | Hazaron Raaste | Saira | PTV |
| 1986 | Sacha Jhota | Zarina | PTV |
| 1986 | Inn Sey Miliay | Zebunnisa | PTV |
| 1986 | Deadline | Shehnaz | PTV |
| 2016 | Mannat | Meera | Geo TV |
| 2017 | Piyari Bittu | Khala | Express Entertainment |
| 2018 | Ranjha Ranjha Kardi | Amma Jannate | Hum TV |
| 2018 | Aangan | Khameera Ilahi | Hum TV |
| 2021 | Qissa Meherbano Ka | Afiya's mother | Hum TV |
| 2024 | DuniyaPur | Nawabzadi | Green Entertainment |

=== Web series ===
| Year | Title | Role | Network |
|---|---|---|---|
| 2021 | Dhoop Ki Deewar | Shobha Malhotra | ZEE5 |

=== Film ===
| Year | Film | Role | Notes |
|---|---|---|---|
| 2011 | Bol | Suraiya Khan | Lux Style Awards; SAARC Film Awards |
| 2011 | The Dusk | Aliya Chauhan | |
| 2015 | Hijrat | Murad's mother | |

== Additional activities ==
Zaib Rehman holds the following degrees:

- Bachelor of Arts and Bachelor of Laws (University of the Punjab)
- D.T.L. (Diploma in Taxation Law)

She currently practices law in Lahore High Court and is providing free legal aid to deserving prisoners. In April 2014, Zaib Rehman - chairwoman of the Lahore High Court Women Prisons Committee - paid for air tickets for two Tanzanians forgotten in Central Jail Lahore (Kot Lakhpat) for two years. The Tanzanians, Umar Ali Suleiman and Muhammad Ashraf Zakki, were jailed for overstay in Pakistan. They returned to their home country on 7 May 2014.

She frequently holds lectures on social topics in different colleges, e. g. at Lahore University of Management Sciences' Feminist Society (FemSoc). In March 2014, she received the Distinguished Alumni Award at Lahore College for Women University.
