= Guddu (TV series) =

2022 Pakistani TV series

- Title screen
- گڈو
- Genre: Soap opera
- Written by: Rukhsana Nigar
- Directed by: Irfan Aslam
- Starring: Fatima Effendi; Ali Abbas; Sohail Sameer; Falak Shahzad Khan
- Country of origin: Pakistan
- Original language: Urdu
- No. of episodes: 74

Production
- Producers: Abdullah Kadwani; Asad Qureshi
- Camera setup: Multi-camera setup
- Running time: 36-40 minutes
- Production company: 7th Sky Entertainment

Original release
- Network: Geo Entertainment
- Release: 18 August – 30 October 2022

Guddu is a 2022 Pakistani social soap opera television series. It is directed by Irfan Aslam, produced by Abdullah Kadwani and Asad Qureshi under their production banner 7th Sky Entertainment. It features Fatima Effendi, Ali Abbas, Falak Shahzad Khan, Sohail Sameer in lead roles.

== Cast ==
- Fatima Effendi as Nayab
- Ali Abbas as Ibad
- Falak Shahzad Khan as Abdul Hadi aka Guddu
- Sohail Sameer as Dawood
- Saleem Mairaj as Sohail: Nayab's brother
- Kinza Malik as Safiya: Saima, Ibad and Sidra's mother
- Aliya Ali as Saima: Sidra and Ibad's elder sister
- Kanwal Khan as Sidra: Saima and Ibad's younger sister
- Babar Khan as Naveed: Zaheer's younger brother and Sidra's 1st husband
- Madiha Rizvi as Noreen: Sohail's wife and Nayab sister-in-law
- Tipu Shareef as Zaheer: Saima's husband and Naveed's elder brother
- Rimha Ahmed as Nazo: a kind girl who rescues Guddu and starts looking after him
- Rashid Farooqui as Fareed: Nazo's father
- Seema Khan as Rakkhi: Nazo's mother
- Farah Nadir as Rasheeda: Farid's sister
- Zain Afzal as Muneeb: love interest of Sidra and her 2nd husband
- Angel Kainat as Ujala: Daud's daughter from the first wife
- Humaira Bano as Zehra: Ujala's maternal grandmother
- Faiza Khan as Zaibi aka Zebunnisa: former love interest of Naveed, back in his life after marriage
- Memoona Qudoos as Sharmeen: Ibad's fiance for the second marriage
- Syeda Aroona as Saima: nayab's friend
- Fahad Ahmed as Khurram: Saima's brother who wanted to marry Nayab
- Maria Jan as Nazia: Daud's neighbor who wants to marry him
- Salma Qadir as Farhat: Nazia's mother
- Rehana Kaleem as Shehnaz: Noreen's Aunt
- Ejaz Ali as Fayyaz: ibad's friend
- Naima Khan as Ujala's aunt
- Behjat Nizami as Choti: Nazo's younger sister
- Tasleem Sualiha as Zoya: Zaheer and Saima's daughter
- Sofia Khan as Zaibi's mother
- Talia Jan

=== Guest appearances ===
- Hina Sheikh as Rahat: Farhat's sister
- Javeria Nayyar as Hadi's school teacher
- Birjees Farooqui as Sharmeen's mother
- Shehzad Mukhtar as Muneeb's uncle
