= Marvi Sirmed =

Pakistani human rights activist

- Born: ماروی سرمد; 11 June 1970 (age 55); Sialkot, Pakistan
- Occupations: Journalist, human rights activist
- Spouse: Sirmed Manzoor

Marvi Sirmed is a Pakistani political commentator, journalist, and human rights activist. She is a social democrat.

== Early life and education ==
Marvi Sirmed was born in Sialkot, Punjab, Pakistan on 11 June 1970. Her paternal family was agriculturist from Bhawalpur. Her father, Chaudhry Anwar ul Haq, was Directorate General of Public Relations Punjab until 2003. In her childhood she accompanied her mother in women's protests.

Before entering teaching and journalism careers she was a sciences student. She was a pre-med student and obtained her master's degree in science and education from the University of Punjab and taught at secondary schools in Lahore.

== Career ==
Sirmed is a social democrat, advocating for secular polity and minority rights in Pakistan. She has advocated for improved domestic violence legislation and governmental secularism.

In 1990s, Sirmed started getting involved in NGO activities along with her journalistic activities. In 2001–2002 she joined the Aurat Foundation's Legislative Watch Programme. In 2004, she worked for The United Nations Development Programme in Pakistan, and simultaneously with the National Commission on the Status of Women, Federal Ministry of Women's Development, and the Parliament of Pakistan.

Marvi Sirmed received the National Human Rights Award of the government of Pakistan in 2010 and Friend of the Parliament Award in 2012. Sirmed was a member of the executive council of the Human Rights Commission of Pakistan and serves as board chair of Bytes for All. She is fellow at National Endowment for Democracy. She has been a freelance journalist since 2016.

== Advocacy and controversies ==
As an outspoken advocate for human rights and secular democracy, Sirmed has attracted controversy among conservatives. In November 2007 she was arrested when she protested the 2007 emergency declared in Pakistan by then military dictator Pervez Musharraf.

When the United States Embassy in Pakistan invited LGBT people to an event, Sirmed's defense of their decision was met with attacks on YouTube. In another televised debate broadcast on YouTube, Sirmed again spoke in defense of LGBT rights, leading her to be threatened with both death and sexual violence. The Coalition For Women In Journalism (CFWIJ) condemned an online harassment and misinformation campaign targeting Sirmed. CFWIJ Founding Director Kiran Nazish complained that the amount of propaganda and harassment of women journalists in Pakistan was unprecedented, with many inciting violence against women journalists in general and Sirmed in particular. Senior journalist member of CFWIJ, Beena Sarwar, said that while social media can be put to good use, it is being misused for negative purposes that violate fundamental rights and human dignity.

In 2016, Sirmed appeared on a live television debate with conservative Islamic scholar and parliamentarian Hafiz Hamdullah. Their argument escalated, leading Hamdullah to threaten her. Later when Hamdullah's citizenship was challenged, she publicly supported him on the issue to criticize officials who saw a problem only with his citizenship and not with his other behavior.

On 3 March 2020, during live TV debates on Neo News, Sirmed interrupted Khalil-ur-Rehman Qamar with the chant "Mera Jism Meri Marzi" ("My Body My Choice"). Qamar called the slogan shameful and made derogatory misogynist remarks about her and shamed her body which led to criticism and boycott of him by media fraternity.

Sirmed explained her position in interviews given to Daud Khattak and DW.com. When asked whether "my body my choice" was priority for women of non-elite social classes, and whether "my life" might be better wording than "my body," Sirmed retorted that "my body, my choice" is an issue relevant to Pakistani women across all classes, and that '“My body, my choice” means that no society can wage their wars at the expense of a woman's body. We ask the men not to use our bodies for their ghairat or honor. We ask them to stop killing us in the name of honor and give us the right to say no because we have the right to say no to anything that we don't feel comfortable with. We must have the right to say that we can't tolerate sexual harassment and to say no to decisions regarding our marriages by other [family members]. Our religion gives us the right to choose our life partner, so why not society?"

== Attacks ==
In 2012 and again in 2018, she was shot at by unidentified gunmen and escaped unhurt. Her home has three times been ransacked, with passports and documents being taken.

== Personal life ==
She is married to journalist Sirmed Manzoor.
