= Khalil-ur-Rehman Qamar =

Pakistani writer (born 1962)

Khalil-ur-Rehman Qamar خلیل الرحمان قمر
- Born: 16 December 1962 (age 63); Lahore, Punjab, Pakistan
- Occupations: Screenwriter; Lyricist; Director; Producer; Poet; Actor
- Years active: 1995–present
- Notable work: Boota from Toba Tek Singh; Landa Bazar; Pyarey Afzal; Sadqay Tumhare; Meray Paas Tum Ho

Khalil-ur-Rehman Qamar (Punjabi: خلیل الرحمان قمر) is a Pakistani screenwriter, director, Urdu poet, lyricist and occasional actor and producer known for writing such dramas as Boota from Toba Tek Singh (1999), Pyarey Afzal (2013), Sadqay Tumhare (2014), the top-rated Meray Paas Tum Ho (2019–2020), as well as the 2019 film Kaaf Kangana.

== Early and personal life ==
=== Education ===
Khalil-ur-Rehman Qamar was born in 1962 in Lahore, Punjab, Pakistan. He studied in a government high school in Shad Bagh, Lahore. He used to write in school too and did further studies in B.Com followed by an MBA.

=== Professional career ===
Khalil worked at the National Bank of Pakistan but sought retirement as he wanted to pursue a writing career.

=== Family ===
He was engaged to his cousin Rukhsana Amin during his teenage but couldn't marry her due to family issues and conflicts. He wrote the drama serial Sadqay Tumhare based on his own love story during his teenage days. In 1985, Khalil married his first wife Rubi Naz. They have a son and a daughter. Khalil ur Rehman married his second wife Rozina Qureshi, while being married to Rubi. Rozina is an actress and was previously married to actor Faysal Qureshi. Khalil ur Rehman has a stepdaughter, Hanish Qureshi, from Rozina's marriage to Faysal and has two children of his own with Rozina.

His son Durrab Khalil (who formerly went with the alias Aabi Khan) is an actor.

== Career ==
Khalil started his TV drama career with Dastak Aur Darwaza (1995), that he wrote and acted in, and later produced a film Qarz (1997) which he also wrote. He also wrote the dialogues of Ghar Kab Aao Gay (2000), Tere Piyar Mein, Mukhra Chan Varga, Nikki Jai Haan but made his breakthrough with Boota from Toba Tek Singh (1999). Later, he used this style in his dramas Landa Bazar (2002) and Love, Life Aur Lahore. Khalil has written various drama serials but he is best known for his super-hit dramas Pyarey Afzal (2013), Sadqay Tumhare (2014), and Meray Paas Tum Ho (2019).

== Controversies ==
=== Feminism and sexism ===
On 3 March 2020, Qamar appeared on a Pakistani talk show on Neo News to discuss the Aurat March. When Qamar was speaking, Marvi Sirmed interrupted Qamar by shouting "Mera Jism Meri Marzi" (meaning "My Body, My Choice"), a feminist slogan. He made obscene remarks about Marvi’s body and also indulged in abusive name-calling towards her. Qamar was accused of sexism and heavily criticized by politicians and prominent figures, while Geo TV suspended his contract. Qamar said he had intervened when it was Sirmed's turn to speak, but she kept interrupting him.

=== Abduction case ===
On 15 July 2024, Qamar was abducted when he went to meet a woman supposedly pretending to be his fan who had allegedly invited him out, very early in the morning around 4:40am. His belongings were taken and a ransom was demanded. During this ordeal, the suspects filmed compromising and explicit videos of Qamar. When he refused to pay further extortion money, these videos were leaked online. The leaked footage shows Qamar with the woman who lured him as well as scenes of the video setup by the woman's accomplices. Majority Pakistanis called the abduction "poetic justice", saying that he was not abducted by men, but by women.

Qamar later filed a complaint with FIA's Cyber Crime Wing. The playwright alleged that the accused deceived him and made videos, later blackmailing him for money. The suspects were arrested and the case is currently proceeding at the Lahore High Court.

== Filmography ==
=== Television serials ===
Year	Title	Screenwriter	Lyricist	Actor	Director	Producer
1995	Dastak Aur Darwaza	Yes		Yes		
1999	Boota from Toba Tek Singh	Yes		Yes		
1999	Chandpur Ka Chandoo	Yes		Yes	Yes	
2000	Good Bye Raishman	Yes				
2000	Tum Yehi Kehna	Yes	Yes			
2002	Landa Bazar	Yes		Yes		
2004	Dil Hai Ke Diya Hai	Yes	Yes	Yes	Yes	Yes
2007	Dilli Ke Bankay	Yes		Yes	Yes	
2008	Uss Paar	Yes				
2009	Jab Hatheli Par Chand Likhna	Yes				
2010	Muhabbat Haar Muhabbat Jeet	Yes	Yes			
2011	Phir Kab Milo Gay	Yes				
2011	Anokhi	Yes	Yes			
2011	Main Mar Gai Shaukat Ali!	Yes				
2012	Adhoori Film Ki Poori Kahani	Yes	Yes			
2012	Beopaar	Yes				
2012	Man Jali	Yes				
2012	Tumhain Kuch Yaad Hai Janan	Yes	Yes			
2013	Bunty I Love You	Yes				
2013	Love Life Aur Lahore	Yes	Yes			
2013	Pyarey Afzal	Yes				
2013	Mian Biwi Minus Love	Yes				
2014	Sadqay Tumhare	Yes				
2015	Mera Naam Yousuf Hai	Yes				
2016	Unsuni	Yes	Yes			
2016	Zara Yaad Kar	Yes	Yes			
2017	Mohabbat Tumse Nafrat Hai	Yes	Yes			
2017	Tau Dil Ka Kia Hua	Yes				
2017	Laal Ishq	Yes				
2019	Meray Paas Tum Ho	Yes	Yes			
2023	Idiot		Yes			
2024	Gentleman	Yes	Yes			
2024	Sunn Mere Dil	Yes				
2025	Main Manto Nahi Hoon	Yes				

=== Television shows ===
Year	Show	Channel	Role
2021	Public with Khalil-ur-Rahman Qamar	Public News	Host
2023	Gup Shab With Vasay Chaudhry	Samaa TV	Guest
2023	Mazaaq Raat	Dunya News	Guest

=== Films ===
Year	Film	Screenwriter	Lyricist	Director	Producer	Language
1997	Qarz	Yes			Yes	Urdu
2000	No Paisa No Problem	Yes				Urdu
2005	Koi Tujh Sa Kahan	Yes				Urdu
2010	Channa Sachi Muchi	Only dialogues				Punjabi
2017	Punjab Nahi Jaungi	Yes				Urdu/Punjabi
2019	Kaaf Kangana	Yes	Yes	Yes	Yes	Urdu
2022	London Nahi Jaunga	Yes				Urdu/Punjabi
2026	Mirza Jatt	Yes				Urdu/Punjabi
