= Landa Bazar (TV series) =

2002 Pakistani television series

- Title screen
- Also known as: Landa Bazaar
- Genre: Drama; Crime; Political thriller
- Written by: Khalil-Ur-Rehman Qamar
- Directed by: Dilawar Malik
- Creative director: Umar Farooq
- Starring: Babar Ali; Farah Shah; Tauqeer Nasir; Firdous Jamal; Ali Zafar; Waseem Abbas; Kashif Mehmood; Mehmood Aslam; Rija Ali; Munir Nadir; Nighat Butt; Faisal Rehman; Jana Malik; Urooj Nasir Sheraz
- Theme music composer: Wajid Ali Nashad
- Composer: Wajid Ali Nashad
- Original languages: Urdu; Punjabi
- No. of seasons: 2
- No. of episodes: 67

Production
- Production location: Lahore
- Cinematography: Syed Naeem Rizvi
- Running time: 35–40 minutes
- Production company: Pakistan Television Corporation

Original release
- Release: 17 April 2002 – 2003

Related
- Laal Ishq

Landa Bazar (Urdu: لنڈا بازار, English: 'Flea Market') is a 2002 Pakistani television drama serial aired on Prime Entertainment (STN). It is directed by Dilawar Malik and written by Khalil-ur-Rehman Qamar. Premiering on 17 April 2002, the serial starred Tauqeer Nasir, Ali Zafar, Waseem Abbas, Kashif Mehmood, Babar Ali, Farah Shah, Mehmood Aslam, Jana Malik and Urooj. A sequel of the series, Laal Ishq was aired on A-Plus TV from 2017 to 2018.

== Plot ==
The series is centered around a young man named Bali (Babar Ali) and his struggle to survive in a world of crime and corruption whilst also trying to build a relationship with his fiancée, Zohra (Farah Shah) and meeting his allies like Jajji Rungbaaz and enemies include Mehr Hukam and Surrya whose son Ramis once had feelings for Zohra. Bali is also step brother to Ramis and Urooj making the love triangle of Ramis, Bali and Zohra more complicated.

== Cast ==
- Babar Ali as Baali (Iqbal)
- Farah Shah as Zohra
- Ali Zafar as Ramis
- Khalil-ur-Rehman Qamar as Mehr Hukam
- Kashif Mehmood as Jajji Rungbaaz
- Waseem Abbas as Mehr Charagh
- Tauqeer Nasir as Yawar Kamal
- Urooj Nasir as Rabi
- Jana Malik as Maham
- Firdous Jamal as Hayat Ahmad
- Mehmood Aslam as Dawar Kamal
- Seemi Raheel as Surayya Batool
- Sohail Umer as Mehar Mubarak
- Rija Ali as Meeran
- Munir Nadir as MasterJee
- Nighat Butt as Hajran
- Faisal Rehman as Babu
- Shafqat Cheema
- Azhar Rangeela as Naju
- Zulfiqar Ali Sher as Billa Bangrian Wala

== Music ==
"Jandi Wari Ohnon Akhoo" by Shafaqat Ali Khan

== Sequel ==
On 26 July 2017, Dawn (newspaper) reported that Laal Ishq, the sequel, will also be written by Khalil-ur-Rehman Qamar and directed by Dilawar Malik. Qamar said, "I believe that the story-line has a coherent continuity and follows a rational trajectory, reflecting what's happening in society today. It has few characters from the original but there is whole new plot and hook to the play but this is surely very close to my heart." Most of the original cast will also reappear after 15 years of its original, except Farah Shah whose role was terminated in the original. Durab Khalil, son of Qamar, and new cast members such as Arsalan Idress, Anzeela Abbasi, Faryal Mehmood and Saba Hameed will make their debut in very important roles. Ali Zafar might also have a comeback on television, if he wants.

The sequel began airing from 14 October 2017 on A-Plus TV. Its official soundtrack has been sung by Rahat Fateh Ali Khan.

== Awards ==
Year	Awards	Category	Nominee/ Receipt	Result	Ref.
2002	Lux Style Awards	Best TV Play	Landa Bazaar	Nominated	
