= Mor Mahal =

- Release poster
- Genre: Fantasy; Romance; Historical fiction
- Created by: Sarmad Khoosat
- Written by: Sarmad Sehbai
- Directed by: Sarmad Khoosat
- Starring: Umair Jaswal; Meesha Shafi; Hina Khawaja Bayat; Fiza Ali; Sania Saeed; Jana Malik; Zahid Ahmed; Shah Fahad; (For entire cast see below)
- Opening theme: Goondh Kay Lao by Fariha Pervez
- Ending theme: Goondh Kay Lao by Fariha Pervez
- Country of origin: Pakistan
- Original language: Urdu
- No. of seasons: 1
- No. of episodes: 43

Production
- Producer: Babar Javed
- Production locations: Lahore, Pakistan
- Camera setup: Multi-Camera setup
- Running time: 35 minutes
- Production company: A&B Entertainment

Original release
- Network: Geo Entertainment; PTV Home
- Release: 24 April 2016 – 18 March 2017

Mor Mahal (Urdu: مور محل, lit. 'Peacock Palace') is a 2016 Pakistani historical fiction television fantasy series. It was directed by Sarmad Khoosat, produced by Babar Javed and originally conceptualized by Imran Aslam in 2002 and written by Sarmad Sehbai in 2004. The series began on 24 April 2016 on Geo Entertainment and PTV Home as a production of A&B Productions.

The serial stars Umair Jaswal, Meesha Shafi, Hina Khawaja Bayat, Sania Saeed and Fiza Ali in the lead roles. The cast includes Shah Fahad, Jana Malik, Sonia Nazir, Kinza Hashmi and Ali Saleem. Umair Jaswal, who played the role of a nawab, and Meesha Shafi both made their television debut through this series.

Mor Mahal is set around 200 years back in an era of Mughal, Greek, Egyptian and Turkish civilizations. The series was based on the life of Nawab Asif Jehan of the Hakim dynasty.

== Cast ==
- Kinza Hashmi as Banki
- Umair Jaswal as Nawab Asif Jehan
- Meesha Shafi as Farrukh Zaad
- Hina Khawaja Bayat as Begum Sarwat Jehan
- Fiza Ali as Surayya Jehan
- Zahid Ahmed as Kabeer
- Sania Saeed as Akhtari
- Jana Malik as Shaista (Kaneez-e-Khaas)
- Shah Fahad as Nawab Shujaat Jehan
- Sonia Nazir as Mehar Bano
- Umer Naru as Shehzada Taimoor
- Xille Huma as Kundni
- Ali Saleem as Shola Jaan
- Suhaee Abro as Jaana
- Mehar Bano as Shehzadi Feroza
- Tahira Imam as Jaana's mother
- Imran Ali as Banki’s friend

== Production ==
The director, Sarmad Khoosat, said that Mor Mahal can be called the Hilal erotic of Pakistan. The first Mor Mahal poster was unveiled by Geo Entertainment in February 2016. In March 2016, Geo Entertainment released the teaser of the show via Facebook.
