= Abid Ali (actor) =

Pakistani actor, director, and producer (1952–2019)

- عابد علی
- Born: Abid Ali; 17 March 1952; Quetta, Pakistan
- Died: 5 September 2019 (aged 67); Karachi, Pakistan
- Occupations: Actor; Director; Producer
- Years active: 1973–2019
- Known for: Waris
- Spouses: Humaira Ali (m. 1976; div. 2006) Rabia Noreen (m. 2006)
- Relatives: Iman Ali (daughter); Rahma Ali (daughter); Maryam Ali (daughter)
- Awards: Pride of Performance Award by the President of Pakistan in 1986

Abid Ali (Urdu: عابد علی; 29 March 1952 – 5 September 2019) was a Pakistani actor, director and producer.

Ali acted in over 200 films and numerous television dramas, but is best known for his role as Dilawar Khan in the 1979 PTV classic drama Waris.

== Early and personal life ==
Born and educated in Quetta, Abid Ali was attracted to the arts from an early age, writing stories and painting in his childhood and teenage years.

Abid Ali was married twice. From his first marriage to actress and singer Humaira Ali (née Chaudhry), he had three daughters, including the supermodel-turned-actress Iman Ali as well as the actress and singer Rahma Ali.

== Career ==
=== Radio and acting ===
He first joined Radio Pakistan in Quetta before going to Lahore after some struggle and launched a successful TV career with PTV's drama serial Jhok Sial in 1973.

=== Direction and production ===
He debuted as a director and producer with the 1993 hit drama Dasht, which was the first private production for a television company (NTM) in Pakistan, while the same year, for PTV this time, he directed the drama Doosra Aasman, the first Pakistani drama shot abroad (Dubai, UAE). This was followed by other projects for many channels, including Saheli in 2007, and Massi aur Malka, a family drama, in 2009, Abid Ali usually also acted in the serials he directed or produced.

== Illness and death ==
Abid Ali was hospitalized on 2 September 2019 at Liaquat National Hospital in Karachi. He died on 5 September 2019 due to liver failure while in the hospital, aged 67. He was laid to rest on 6 September 2019 after his funeral prayers were held at Masjid-e-Aashiq in Bahria Town, Karachi.

== Selected filmography ==
=== Films ===
Year	Title	Role
1979	Khaak aur Khoon	
1983	Gumnam	
1985	Awaaz	
1988	Roti	
1989	Sarfarosh	
1990	Nageena	
1990	Insaniyat Kay Dushman	Nawab Sahab
1991	Kalay Chor	Aashiq Shah
1991	Watan Kay Rakhwalay	Jankia
1991	Cobra	Inspector Khan
1992	Fateh	
1994	Sher Punjab Da	
1995	Jungle Ka Qanoon	
2004	Moosa Khan	
2009	Mr. Bhatti On Chutti	Inspector Javed Khan
2019	Heer Maan Ja	

=== Television serials ===
Year	Title	Role	Director	Producer	Screenwriter	Channel	Ref(s).
1973	Jhok Sial					PTV	
1979–80	Waris	Dilawar Khan				PTV	
1983	Samundar	Ahmad Kamal alias Iftikhar and Zaman				PTV	
1984	Aan					PTV	
1985	Apnay Log	Murad				PTV	
1986	Waqt					PTV	
1986	Hazaron Raaste	Murad Khan				PTV	
1989	Pyas	Qadir Khan				PTV	
1989	Khwahish					PTV	
1991	Dooriyan					NTM	
1993	Dasht	Shah Shams	Yes	Yes		NTM	
1993	Doosra Aasman	Seth Hashim Ali	Yes	Yes		PTV	
2000	Hawa Pe Raqs		Yes	Yes		PTV	
2003	Mehndi	Ali Hassan				PTV	
2004	Patal					PTV	
2004	Saiban Sheeshay Ka		Yes	Yes	Yes	PTV	
2004	Moorat	Eunuch Reshma				ARY Digital	
2005	Naseeb					PTV	
2005	Matti					PTV	
2005	Mar Jayen Hum Tau Kiya					ATV (Pakistan)	
2006	Burns Road Ki Neelofar					ARY Digital	
2007	Saheli		Yes			PTV	
2009	Massi Aur Malka		Yes			Geo TV	
2012	Do Naina		Yes			Express Entertainment	
2013	Bunty I Love You	Patel				Hum TV	
2014	Rukhsati					Geo TV	
2014	Khan Sahib					Indus Vision	
2014	Riwaaj		Yes			Urdu 1	
2014	Khanabadosh		Yes			TV One	
2015	Diyar-e-Dil	Bakhtiar Ahmed Khan “Agha Jaan”				Hum TV	
2016	Kuch Naa Kaho	Sohail				Hum TV	
2017	Naagin	Professor Abdul Quddus				Geo Kahani	
2017	Pinjra					A-Plus TV	
2017	Jaltay Gulab					TV One	
2017	Dastar e Ana					TV One	
2017	Daldal	Saqib				Hum TV	
2017	Dil e Nadaan					Express TV	
2017	Gustakh Ishq					Urdu1	
2018	Tajdeed e Wafa					Hum TV	
2018	Aangan					Hum TV	
2018	Dilara	Nawab Salahuddin				BOL	
2018	Seerat					Geo TV	
2019	Dil Kiya Karay	Raza				Geo TV	
2019	Mera Rab Waris	Zaheer				Geo TV	
2019	Ramz-e-Ishq					Geo TV	
2019	Mera Qasoor					ARY Digital	

== Awards and nominations ==
- In 1986 he was awarded Nigar Award for Best Actor for drama Hazaron Raaste.
- Pride of Performance Award by the President of Pakistan in 1986.

Year	Ceremony	Category	Project	Result
2004	3rd Lux Style Awards	Best TV Actor	Mehndi	Nominated
2005	4th Lux Style Awards	Best TV Actor (Satellite)	Moorat	Nominated
2016	4th Hum Awards	Most Impactful Character	Diyar-e-Dil	Won

== See also ==
- List of Lollywood actors
