= Production rule =

Production rule may refer to:

- Production rules used in business rule engines, cognitive modeling and artificial intelligence, see Production system
- Production rules that expand nodes in formal grammars, see production (computer science)
- Rules governing legal requests that documents be provided, see request for production

== See also ==
- Production Rule Representation, an OMG standard for production rules used in production systems
