= Production system =

Production system may refer to:

- Computer Animation Production System (CAPS), developed by the Walt Disney Company and Pixar in the 1980s
- Production system (computer science), a program used to provide some form of artificial intelligence
- Production systems, in operations management and industrial engineering
- Subsea Production Systems, typically wells located on the seafloor
- Toyota Production System, organizes manufacturing and logistics at Toyota
