= Kaaf Kangana =

- Film poster
- Directed by: Khalil-ur-Rehman Qamar
- Written by: Khalil-ur-Rehman Qamar
- Produced by: Khalil-ur-Rehman Qamar
- Starring: Ayesha Omer; Sami Khan; Eshal Fayyaz; Fiza Ali; Saiqa; Saba Hameed; Saba Faisal
- Edited by: Zeeshan Aslam
- Music by: Naveed Nashad; Sahir Ali Bagga
- Production company: KRQ Productions
- Distributed by: ARY Films
- Release date: 25 October 2019
- Country: Pakistan
- Language: Urdu

Kaaf Kangana (Urdu: کاف کنگنا) is a 2019 Pakistani film. It features Sami Khan, Eshal Fayyaz, Fiza Ali and Ayesha Omer. The film was released worldwide on 25 October 2019. Written and directed by Khalil-ur-Rehman Qamar, the film was a critical and commercial failure.

== Cast ==
- Sami Khan as Ali Mustafa
- Eshal Fayyaz as Kangana
- Ayesha Omer as Gulnaz
- Fiza Ali as Anjali
- Saba Hameed
- Abi Khan as Tony
- Sajid Hasan
- Azra Aftab as Kangana's mother
- Naseem Vicky
- Vasay Chaudhry
- Bilal Chaudhry
- Saiqa as Kangana's grandmother
- Saba Faisal
- Mehmood Aslam
- Arslan idrees
- Neelam Muneer as item number Khwaboon Mein

== Marketing and release ==
The film was initially scheduled for release on Eid al-Adha, but was rescheduled to be released worldwide on 25 October 2019.

== Reception ==
After its release, critics called it a "massive disappointment" on the face of Lollywood. It also emerged as a box office bomb, grossing low numbers on Friday, earning about 0.19 crores, and then went on to score similar numbers on Saturday (0.2 crores) and Sunday (0.18 crores).

== Soundtrack ==
Kaaf Kangana

Soundtrack album by Naveed Nashad, Sahir Ali Bagga
- Recorded: 2019
- Genre: Feature film soundtrack
- Language: Urdu

The soundtrack of the film is composed by Naveed Nashad. Lyrics are written by Khalil ul Rehman Qamar.

Track listing
No.	Title	Lyrics	Music	Singer(s)	Length
1.	"Khawabon Mein/Pakistan Gayi"	Khalil ul Rehman Qamar	Sahir Ali Bagga	Aima Baig
2.	"Dil Mul Wikda"	Khalil ul Rehman Qamar	Sahir Ali Bagga	Rahat Fateh Ali Khan and Bina Ali
3.	"Jaane Man"	Khalil ul Rehman Qamar	Naveed Nashad	Shafqat Amanat Ali Khan and Bina Ali
4.	"Mukka Maar"	Khalil ul Rehman Qamar	Naveed Nashad	JABAR Abbas and Zafar Fani
