= Producer =

Producer(s), The Producer(s), or co-producer(s) may refer to:

== Occupations ==
- Producer (agriculture), a farm operator
- Producer, a stakeholder of economic production
- Film producer, supervises the making of films
  - Executive producer, contributes to a film's budget and usually does not work on set
- Impresario, a producer or manager in the theatre and music industries
- Line producer, manager during daily operations of a film or TV series
- News producer, person who compiles all items of a news programme into a cohesive show
- Online producer, person who oversees the making of content for websites
- Radio producer, person who oversees the making of a radio show
- Record producer, person who manages sound recording and creates beats
- Television producer, person who oversees all aspects of video production on a television program
- Theatrical producer, person who oversees the staging of theatre productions
- Video game producer, person in charge of overseeing development of a video game
- Video producer, person who oversees the creation of video content

== Film and television ==
- "The Producer", an episode of Gilligan's Island
- The Producers (1967 film), black comedy by Mel Brooks
- The Producers (2005 film), American musical comedy film based on 1967 film of the same name
- The Producers (TV series), 2015 South Korean television series
- "The Producers" (Smash), the 28th episode of the American television series Smash

== Music and performance ==
- The Producers (American band), a new wave and power pop band from Atlanta, Georgia
- The Producers (musical), a stage musical adapted by Mel Brooks and Thomas Meehan from the 1967 film
- The Producers (Trebol Clan album), a collaborative album by Trebol Clan, Dr. Joe & Mr. Frank
- The Trevor Horn Band (previously The Producers), an English supergroup

== Other uses ==
- Producer (biology) or autotroph, an organism that synthesizes energy-rich organic compounds
- The Producers, a pub in Grenfell Street, Adelaide, South Australia

== See also ==
- Producerism, a political ideology
