= Dilawar Malik =

Pakistani television actor and director

Dilawar Malik is a Pakistani television actor and director. He is best known for directing acclaimed PTV dramas Boota from Toba Tek Singh and Landa Bazar.

== Career ==
Malik began his career in the late 1990s when he directed several television series for PTV including Boota from Toba Tek Singh, written by Khalil-ur-Rehman Qamar. He then directed Landa Bazar in 2002, which became an overnight success. The television series he has directed mostly are culturally rooted and at times set in the Walled City of Lahore. He also directed series for satellite television network including Wafa Kaisi Kahan Ka Ishq (2011), Nadamat (2012) and Laal Ishq (2017) which is the sequel of Landa Bazar.

== Filmography ==
- Boota from Toba Tek Singh
- Landa Bazar
- Wafa Kaisi Kahan Ka Ishq
- Nadamat
- Daray Daray Naina
- Ek Kasak Reh Gayi
- Laal Ishq
- GT Road
- Inteha e Ishq
