= 1st Lux Style Awards =

2002 Pakistani awards ceremony

- Date: 20 February 2002; 24 years ago
- Site: Naval Base, Karachi
- Hosted by: Reema Khan

Television coverage
- Channel: ARY Digital

The 2002 Lux Style Awards, officially known as the 1st Lux Style Awards ceremony, presented by the Lux Style Awards, honours the best films of 2001 and took place between 18 and 20 February 2002. The programme was developed and led by Naheed Chowdhry, who co-created the concept with Frieha Altaf. "I wanted to ensure that there was a sustainable legacy created that impartially assessed contributors and gave back to society through scholarships in the arts and culture arena", says Chowdhry."One that would go on to be recognised as the 'Oscars' of Pakistan."

This year, the city of Karachi played host to the Pakistani Film Industry.

The official ceremony took place on 18 February 2002, at the Karachi Air Force Base, in Karachi. During the ceremony, Lux Style Awards were awarded in 27 competitive categories. The ceremony was televised in Pakistan and internationally on ARY Digital. Actor Reema Khan hosted the ceremony.

== Background ==
The Lux Style Awards is an award ceremony held annually in Pakistan since 2002. The awards celebrate "style" in the Pakistani entertainment industry, and honour the country's best talents in film, television, music, and fashion. Around 30 awards are given annually.

== Winners and nominees ==
Winners are listed first and highlighted in boldface.

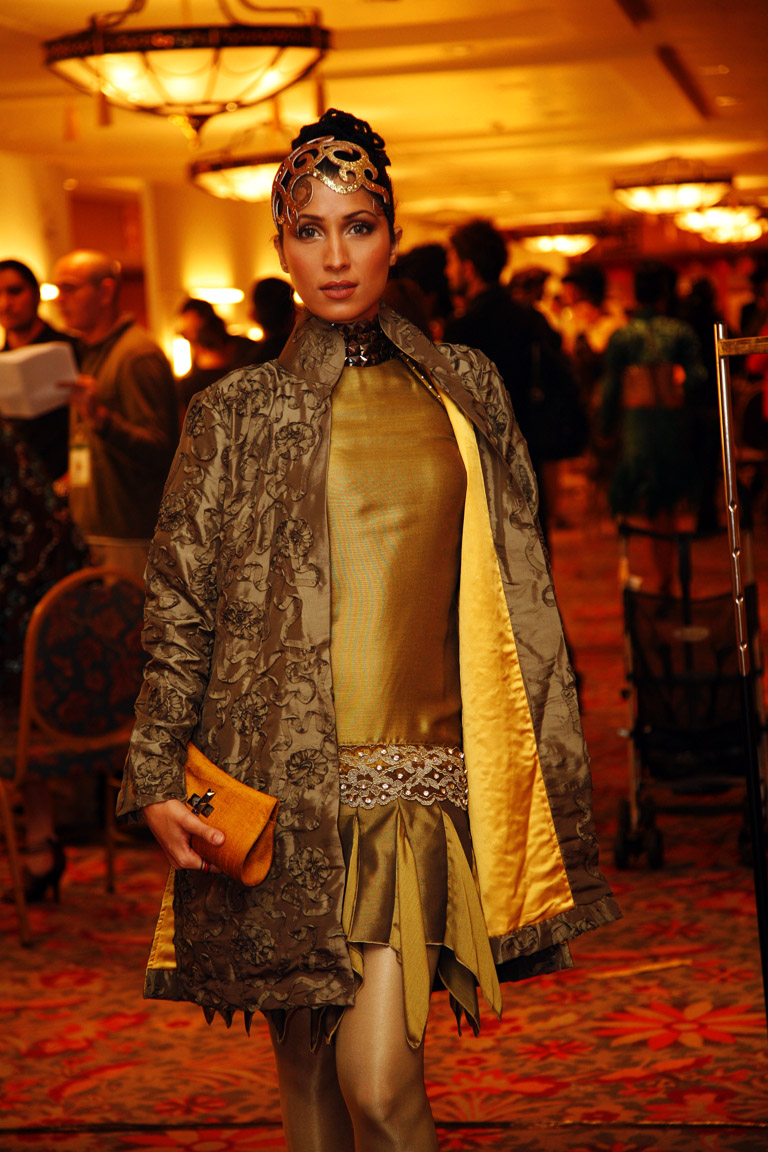
Vaneeza Ahmad (Best Model)

2002 nominees and winners
Category	Nominees	Winner(s)
Film
Best Film	Ghar Kab Aao Gay; Khoey Ho Tum Kahan	**Tere Pyaar Mein**
Best Film Actor	Babar Ali; Moammar Rana	**Shaan Shahid**
Best Film Actress	Meera; Reema Khan; Saima Noor	**Zara Sheikh**
Television
Best Television Play	Aur Zindagi Badalti Hai-PTV; Chalte Chalte-Indus Vision	**Kabhi Kabhi Pyaar Main-PTV**
Best Television Actor	Adnan Siddiqui; Humayun Saeed; Shabbir Jan	**Noman Ijaz**
Best Television Actress	Marina Khan; Nadia Jamil; Saba Hameed; Sania Saeed; Samina Ahmad	**Sadia Imam**
Music
Best Music Act	Hadiqa Kiani; Junoon; Shazia Manzoor; Strings	**Abrar Ul Haq**
Best Video Director	Asim Raza; Jami	**Ahsan Rahim & Amna Khan**
Miscellaneous & general awards
Best Architect	Arshad Shahid Abdullah; Tariq Hassan; Tariq Qaiser	Tie: **Habib Fida Ali**; **Nayyar Ali Dada**
Best Fine Artist	Amin Gulgee; Naheed Raza; Qudoos Mirza; Unver Shafi	**Naiza Khan**
Best New Creativity	Harrapan Project; Kara Film Festival; Mohatta Palace Museum	**Food Street – Lahore**
Best New Talent	Angeline Malik; Rahim Shah; Shazia Manzoor	**Ayla Hussain**
Humanitarian Award	Abdul Sattar Edhi; Asma Jehangir	**Adeeb Rizvi**

== Special awards ==
=== Icon of the Year ===
Nusrat Fateh Ali Khan

=== Life Time Achievement award ===
Noor Jehan
