= Dude food =

Food trend

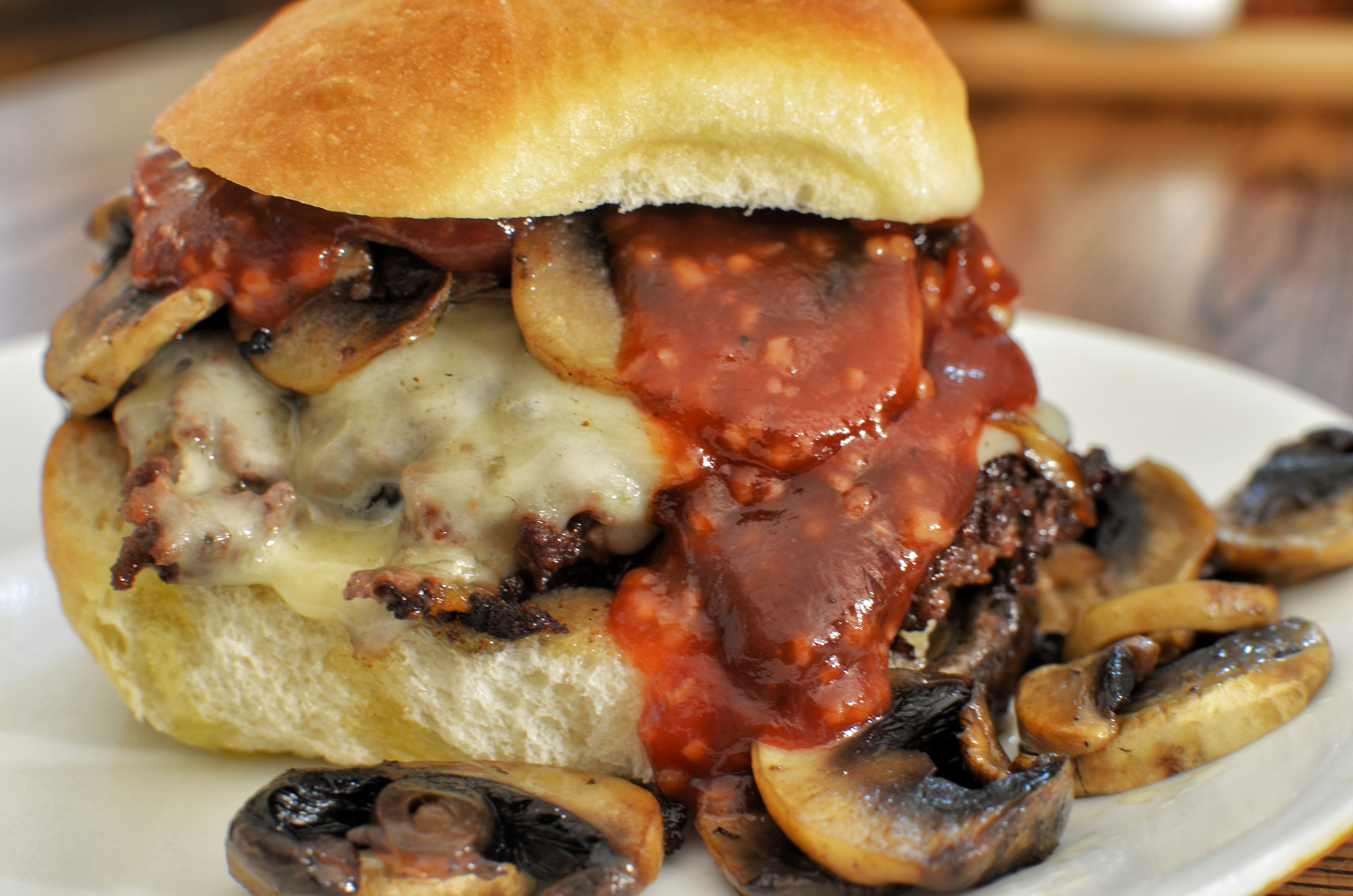
Gourmet hamburgers, like this one with mushrooms, Swiss cheese, and garlic ketchup, are considered to be part of the dude food trend

Dude food is a 21st century food trend largely consisting of heavy, meaty dishes that are thought to appeal to men or express masculinity. Dishes such as hamburgers, hot dogs, or barbecue ribs may also be considered dude food, though dude food versions of these dishes often distinguish themselves with exaggerated use of specific ingredients such as whiskey, barbecue sauce, bacon, or cheese.

== Development ==
It is thought that the dude food trend originated in the early 2000s, most likely in the southern region of the United States. A common theory is that the trend arose from the food truck and street food movements, which are defined by their offerings of easily accessible comfort food. The trend expanded as a social media phenomenon, and its associated term was eventually added to the Collins dictionary in 2016. Dude food has inspired a growing number of academic and non-academic literature. Although the trend has spread widely within the public consciousness, journalists, bloggers, and academics have struggled to coin a precise, widely accepted definition for “dude food.” The various proposed definitions share elements such as that of gender stereotypes, the predominance of meat-heavy dishes, and the exclusion of “feminine” types of food.

Increased awareness of the implications of high cholesterol diets, alongside other recent health findings suggesting that men are twice as likely as women to suffer severe heart problems, appear to have broadened dude food offerings to encompass light, vegetable-based options.

== Geographical diffusion ==
The trend is said to have originated in North America, and following its success, expanded into other countries, reaching Europe, Oceania, and Asia. This concept also arrived in the United Kingdom, where it has influenced a number of dude food inspired restaurants which mix British national dishes with dude food characteristics.

The trend has also appeared particularly in Australia, as a result of dissatisfaction with fast food and the demand for higher-quality, but not necessarily "healthy" food.

Dude food was considered to be one of the fastest-growing trends in the year 2018. The arrival of dude food in Japan influenced the usual nutritious rice and fish-based cuisine by combining it with the more heavy and greasier style of dude food.

== Dude food advertising ==
Dude food advertising and representation tends to follow the traditional gender binary and can be analyzed from a visual perspective, by taking into account the representation of gender identity in the food industry. Thus, dude food is considered to be part of those products which are “gendered in a practice of normative sexual dualism reinforced and maintained within (…) cultural institutions of marketing communication and market segmentation”. According to this, advertising plays a significant role in defining this dualism concerning gender identity, since its language represents a tool contributing to the creation and reflection of social norms.

According to Katherine Parkin, the gender binary in advertising took shape in the 1950s, following the theories of Ernest Dichter. Parkin believed “by convincing Americans of a food’s sex and its resultant gendered identity, as well as its sensuality, advertisers could suggest their foods to meet consumers’ need to fulfill their gender roles." And “Dichter believed that many people categorized the sex of foods. However, his own subscription to a gendered taxonomy of food is evident in his assessment of the findings”.

Moreover, the food product itself as well as the related packaging and advertisement are employed as tools to transmit an idea of how men and women should eat and behave, in keeping with the findings of studies on dude food.

An example of advertising in England is the Ginsters (English food company) advertisement of a beef pasty accompanied by the hashtag #FeedTheMan, in which there is a man that tells a joke in front of his girlfriend’s bosses; but he is talking about Ginsters, thus she has nothing to worry about, because it’s a type of food that makes everyone agree.

In accordance with Lynsey Atkin, advertisement agencies and brands have honed in on a crisis of masculinity in our society and “in times of insecurity, brands can repurpose themselves as champions of the every man, facilitators of the macho clean, however small. In other words, promising gender-traditional-prowess, like being able to kick a football in a straight line, could be the media-constructed equivalent of helping you grow a beard. Some stereotypes, like male dominance in social situations, are invoked as a nostalgia (a dream of the football-playing and beard-growing of days gone by)".

In some places it can be hard to find an advertisement of men eating chocolate. However, in Canada there is an advertisement for chocolate bar Mr. Big produced by Cadbury. The advertising slogan “When you're this big they call you Mister” likely is an oblique reference to male genitalia, adding an element of sexualization to the messaging surrounding the product.

Furthermore, specific events were organized in Canada and promoted in order to provide dude food dishes and a certain atmosphere, born specifically to satisfy men's tastes. Women were welcomed, but only as supporters of their men.

== Gender and food ==
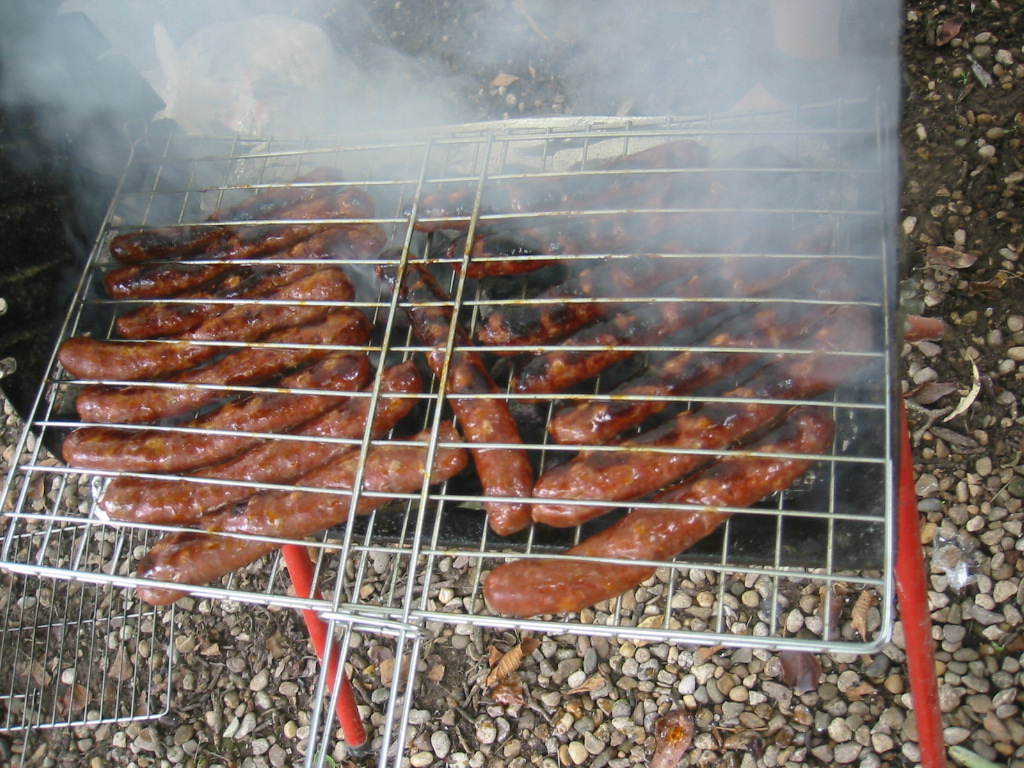
Barbecuing is sometimes seen as an activity through which men might "enhance their masculinity"

According to the feminist scholar Judith Butler, gender is "an identity tenuously constituted in time (…) instituted through a stylized repetition of acts". In fact, "performing food labor is intertwined with performing gender". In particular, several studies focus on how certain foods, drinks, or ways of eating and drinking are interpreted as "masculine"; a crucial example of this attributed masculinity to certain types of food is represented by dude food. Scholars have suggested that this masculinization of food practices might be the expression of masculine privilege, which "manifests around food and cooking in a myriad of ways".

Meat is considered to be one of the most important ingredients of "masculine" food, since meat conveys the meaning of "sexuality and virility". Thus, if masculinity is related to meat, a mostly vegetarian diet is inevitably interpreted as feminine. Not only the consumption of meat, but also the various ways in which it is cooked, are associated with a specific idea of masculinity. For instance, barbecued meat and its consumption have always been seen as a rather masculine activity. There is a growing literature demonstrating how types of unhealthy food are interpreted to be masculine because of the presence of cultural stereotypes according to which women tend to eat a healthier diet than men.

This differentiation could also be attributed to the packaging of food products. Strong stereotypes are deeply embedded in consumers buying preferences.

== See also ==
- Masculinity
- Meat consumption
- Meat consumption by country
- Gender advertisement
- Junk food
- Street food
- Girl dinner
