= Street food =

Ready-to-eat food or drink on a street

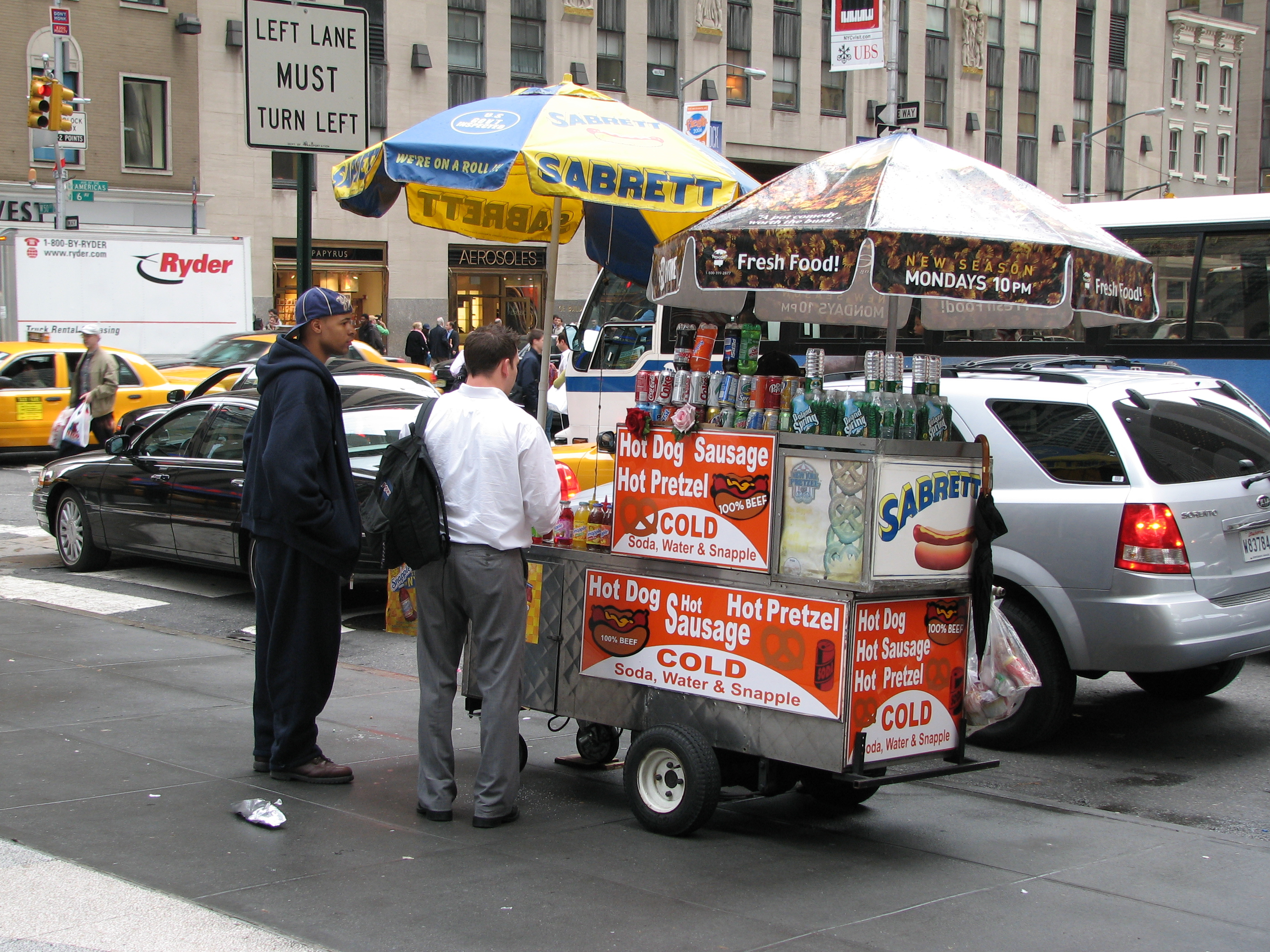
Street food in New York City

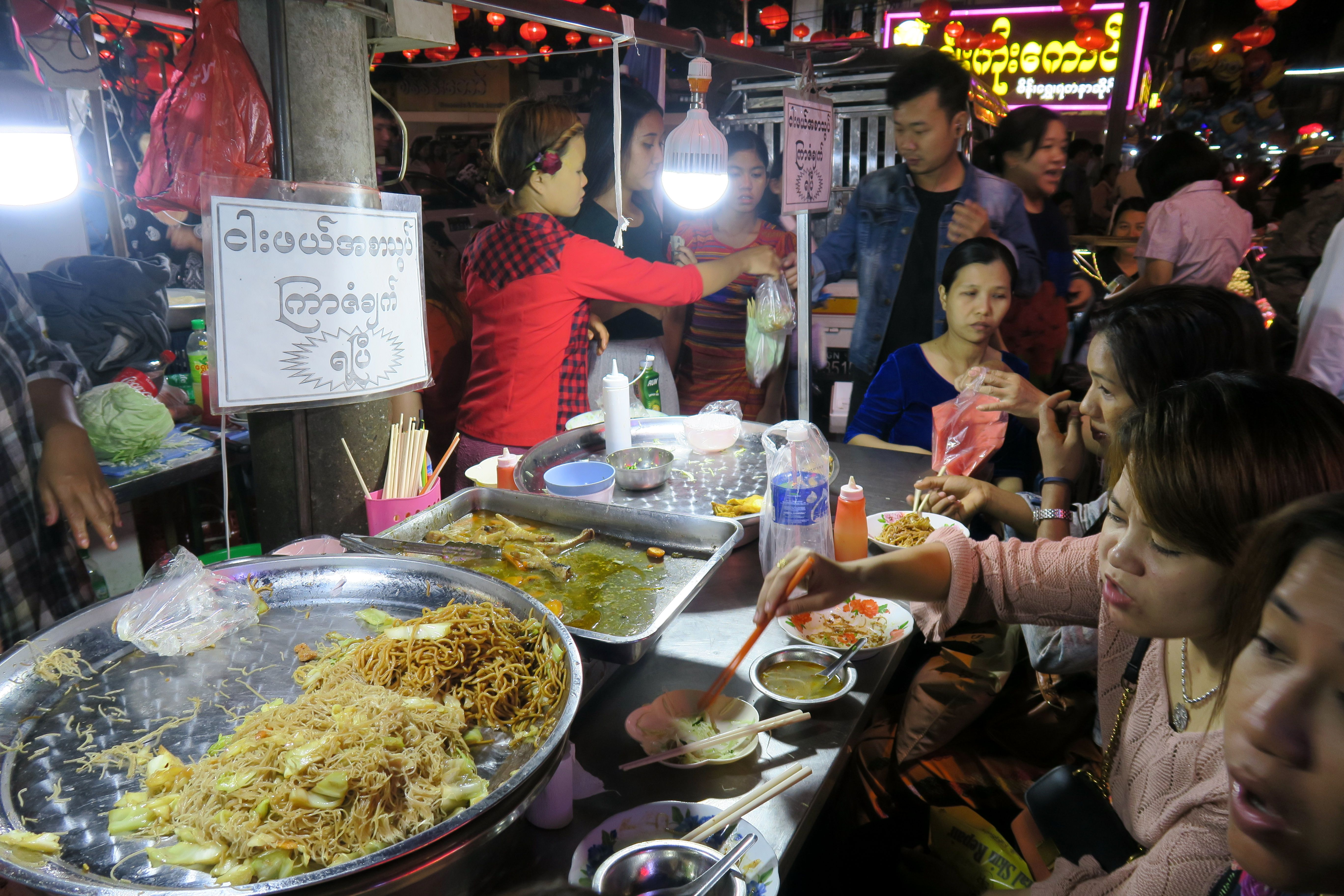
Street food in Chinatown, Yangon, Myanmar

Street food is food sold by a hawker or vendor on a street or at another public place, such as a market, fair, or park. It is often sold from a portable food booth, food cart, or food truck and is meant for immediate consumption. Some street foods are regional, but many have spread beyond their regions of origin. Most street foods are classified as both finger food and fast food, and are generally cheaper than restaurant meals. The types of street food vary between regions and cultures in different countries around the world. According to a 2007 study from the Food and Agriculture Organization, 2.5 billion people eat street food every day. While some cultures consider it to be rude to walk on the street while eating, a majority of middle- to high-income consumers rely on the quick access and affordability of street food for daily nutrition and job opportunities, particularly in developing countries.

A video clip of a vendor making churros in Colombia

Today governments and other organizations are increasingly concerned with both the socioeconomic importance of street food and its associated risks. These risks include food safety, sanitation issues, illegal use of public or private areas, social problems, and traffic congestion.

== History ==
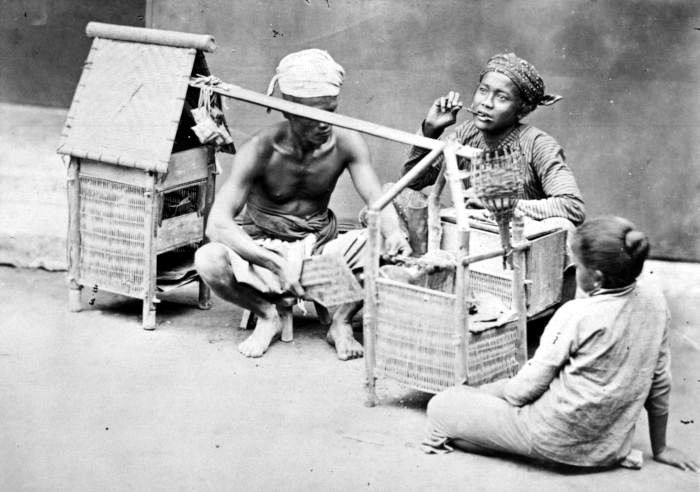
Satay street vendor in Java, Dutch East Indies, c. 1870, using pikulan or carrying baskets using a rod

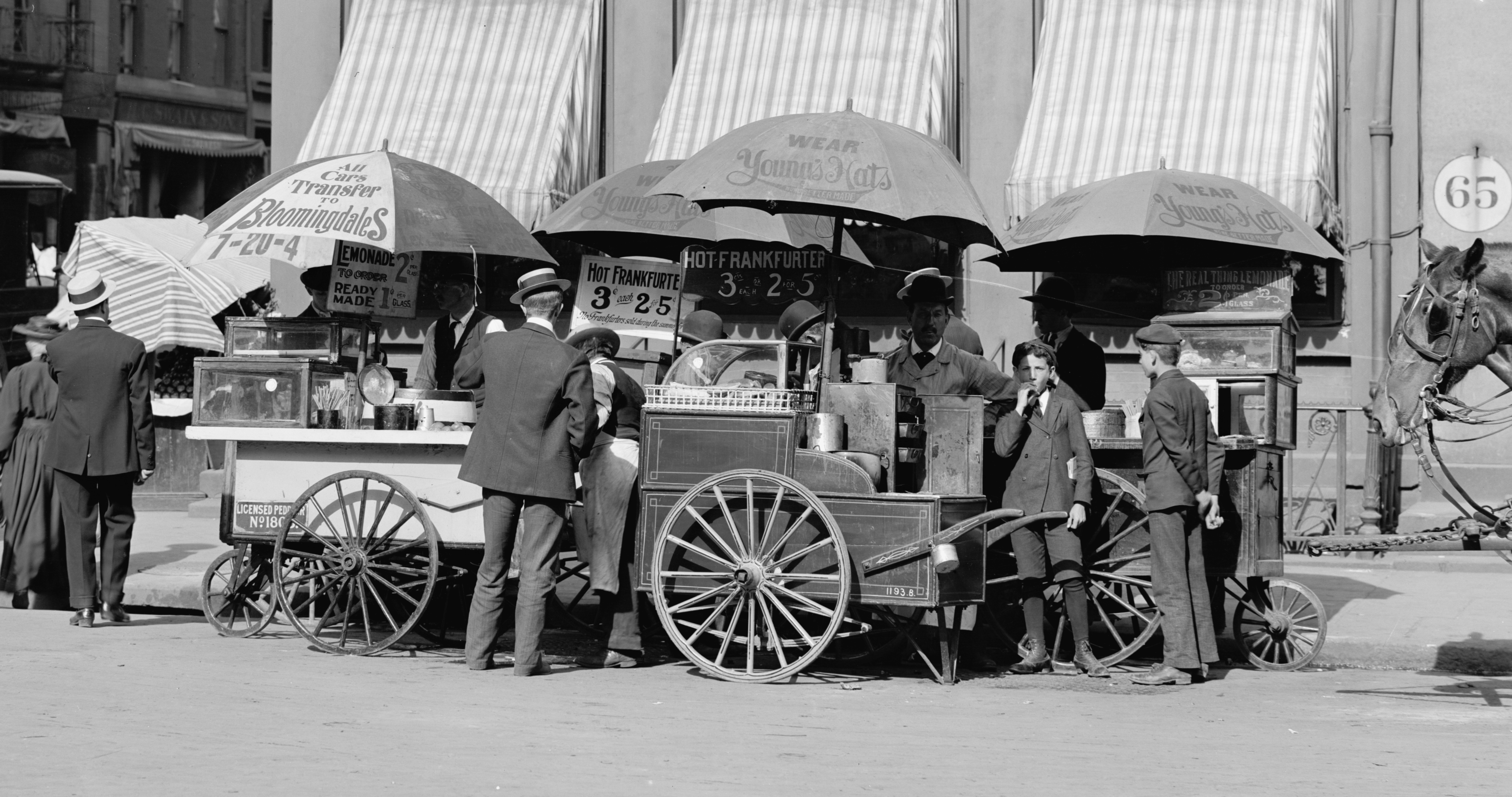
The presence of street food vendors in New York City throughout much of its history, such as these c. 1906, are credited with helping support the city's rapid growth.

=== Europe ===
In ancient Greece, small fried fish was a street food; however, the Greek philosopher Theophrastus held the custom of street food in low regard. Evidence of a large number of street food vendors was discovered during the excavation of Pompeii. Street food was widely consumed by poor urban residents of ancient Rome whose tenement houses did not have ovens or hearths. Chickpea soup with bread and grain paste were common meals.

A travelling Florentine reported in the late 14th century noted that in Cairo, people brought picnic cloths made of rawhide to spread on the streets and sit on while they ate their meals of lamb kebabs, rice, and fritters they purchased from street vendors. In Renaissance Turkey, many crossroads had vendors selling "fragrant bites of hot meat," including chicken and lamb that had been spit-roasted. In 1502, Ottoman Turkey became the first country to legislate and standardize the sale of street food.

In the 19th century, street food vendors in Transylvania sold gingerbread nuts, cream mixed with corn, and bacon and other meat fried on top of ceramic vessels with hot coals inside. French fries, consisting of fried strips of potato, probably originated as a street food in Paris in the 1840s. Street foods in Victorian London included tripe, pea soup, pea pods in butter, whelk, prawns and jellied eels.

=== Americas ===
Aztec market places had vendors who sold beverages such as atolli ("a gruel made from maize dough"), almost 50 types of tamales (with ingredients ranging from the meat of turkey, rabbit, gopher, frog and fish to fruits, eggs and maize flowers), as well as insects and stews. Spanish colonization brought European food stocks like wheat, sugarcane and livestock to Peru, but most commoners continued to primarily eat their traditional diets. Imports were only accepted at the margins of their diet, for example, grilled beef hearts sold by street vendors. Some of Lima's 19th-century street vendors such as "Erasmo, the 'negro' Sango vendor" and Na Agardite are still remembered today.

During the American Colonial period, "street vendors sold oysters, roasted corn ears, fruit, and sweets at low prices to all classes." Oysters, in particular, were cheap and popular street food until around 1910 when overfishing and pollution caused prices to rise. Street vendors in New York City faced considerable opposition. After previous restrictions had limited their operating hours, street food vendors were completely banned in New York City by 1707. Many women of African descent made their living selling street foods in America in the 18th and 19th centuries, with products ranging from fruit, cakes, and nuts in Savannah, to coffee, biscuits, pralines and other sweets in New Orleans. Cracker Jack started as one of many street food exhibits at the Columbian Exposition.

=== Asia ===
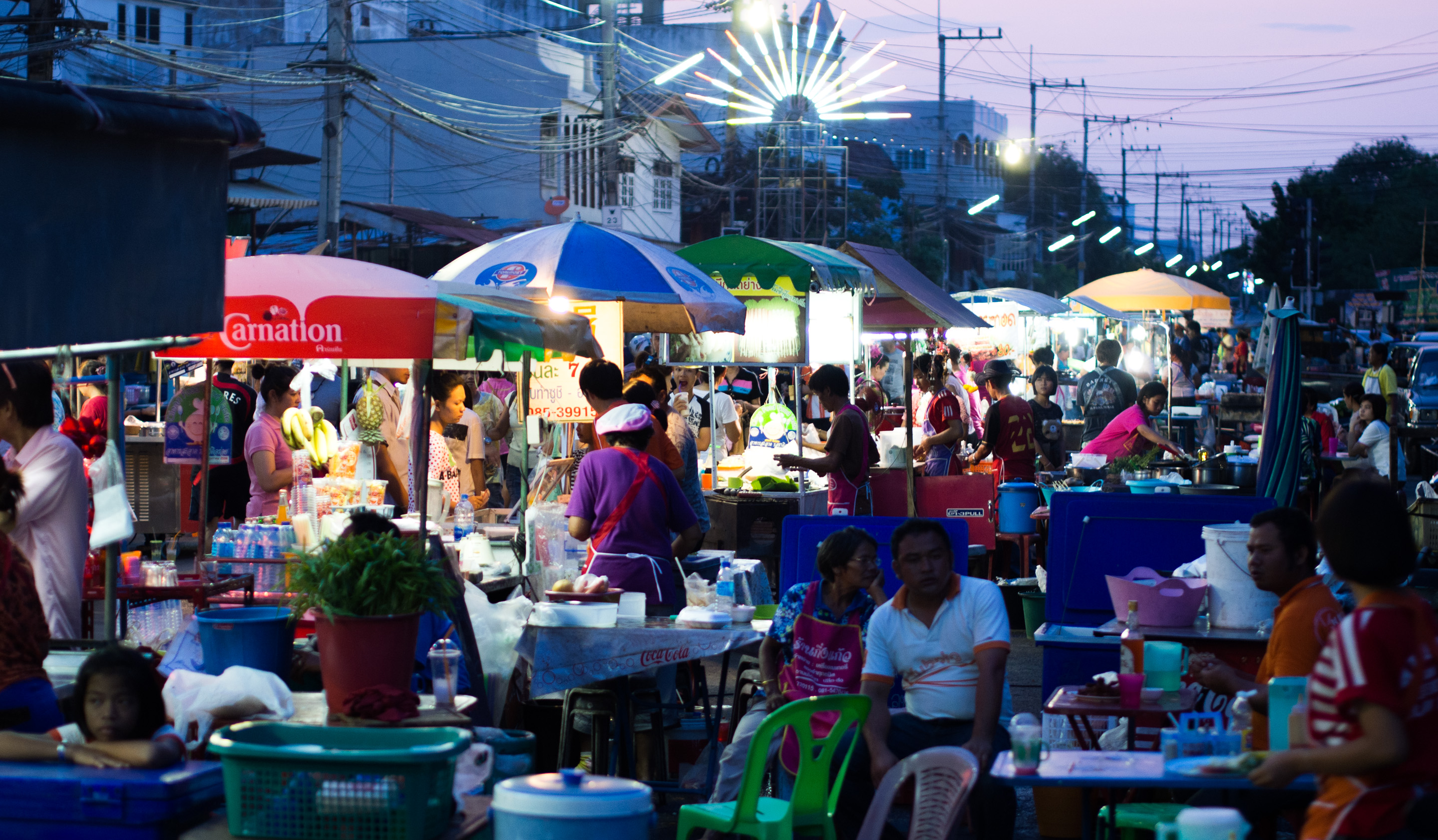
A whole street taken up by street food vendors during the Yasothon Rocket Festival in Thailand

The selling of street food in China stretches back millennia and became an integral part of Chinese food culture during the Tang Dynasty. In ancient China, street food primarily catered to the poor, although wealthy residents would often send servants to buy street food and bring it back for their meals at home. Street food continues to play a major role in Chinese cuisine with regional street food generating a strong interest in culinary tourism among both domestic and international travellers. Because of the Chinese diaspora, Chinese street food has had a major influence on other cuisines across Asia and even introduced the concept of a street food culture to various countries. The street food culture in much of Southeast Asia was established by coolie workers imported from China during the late 19th century.

Ramen, whose predecessor was originally brought to Japan by Chinese immigrants in the late 19th or early 20th century, began as a street food for Chinese laborers and students who lived in Yokohama Chinatown. However, ramen gradually became a "national dish" of Japan and even acquired regional variations as it spread across the country.

Street food was commonly sold by the ethnic Chinese population of Thailand and did not become popular among native Thai people until the early 1960s, when the rapid urban population growth stimulated the street food culture, and by the 1970s it had "displaced home-cooking." As a result, many Thai street foods are derived from or heavily influenced by Chinese cuisine. About 76% of urban residents in Thailand regularly visit street food vendors. The rise of the country's tourism industry has also contributed to the popularity of Thai street food. Thailand's 103,000 street food vendors alone generated 270 billion baht in revenues in 2017. Suvit Maesincee, Minister of Higher Education, Science, Research and Innovation, expects the Thai street food segment to grow by six to seven percent annually from 2020 onwards. Multiple studies showed that contamination of food that street food vendors sell is at the same level as the contamination at restaurants. An estimated 2% or 160,000 vendors provide street food for Bangkok's 8 million people.

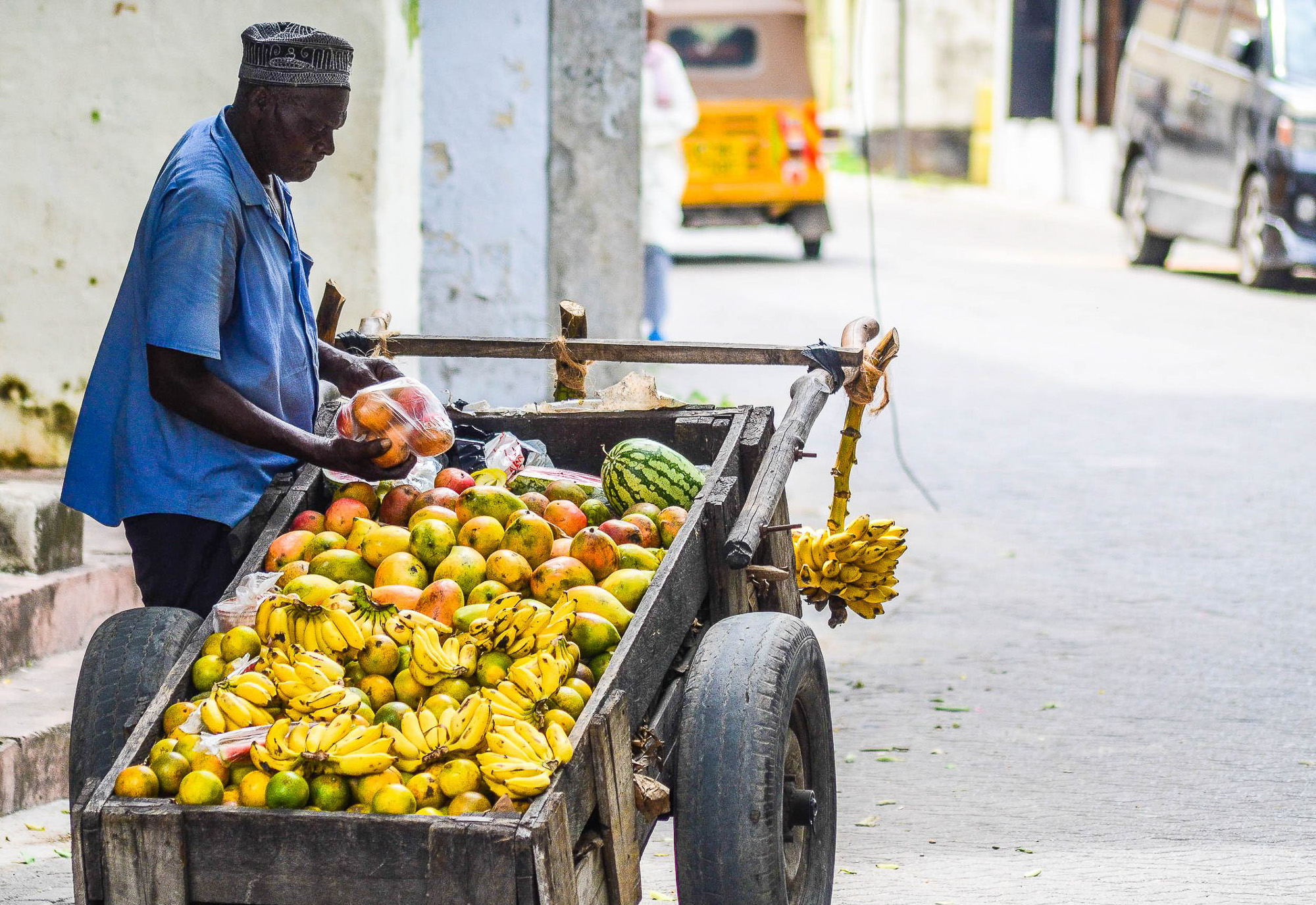
A fruit vendor in Zanzibar

The Arthashastra mentions food vendors in ancient India. One regulation states that "those who trade in cooked rice, liquor, and flesh" are to live in the south of the city. Another states that superintendents of storehouses may give surpluses of bran and flour to "those who prepare cooked rice, and rice-cakes", while a regulation involving city superintendents references "sellers of cooked flesh and cooked rice".

In Delhi, India, it is said that kings used to visit the kebab vendors on the street, which are still in operation. During the colonial times, fusion street food was created, which was made with British customers in mind.

In Indonesia, especially Java, traveling food and drink vendors have a long history, as they were described in temple bas reliefs dated from the 9th century, as well as mentioned in 14th-century inscriptions as a line of work. In Indonesia, street food is sold from carts and bicycles. During the colonial Dutch East Indies period c. 19th century, several street foods were developed and documented, including satay and dawet (cendol) street vendors. The current proliferation of Indonesia's vibrant street food culture is contributed by the massive urbanization in recent decades that has opened opportunities in food service sectors. This took place in the country's rapidly expanding urban agglomerations, especially in Greater Jakarta, Bandung, and Surabaya.

Singapore has a large number of hawker centres which evolved from the traditional commerce of street food and was incorporated into UNESCO's List of Intangible Cultural Heritage on 16 December 2020.

== Around the world ==
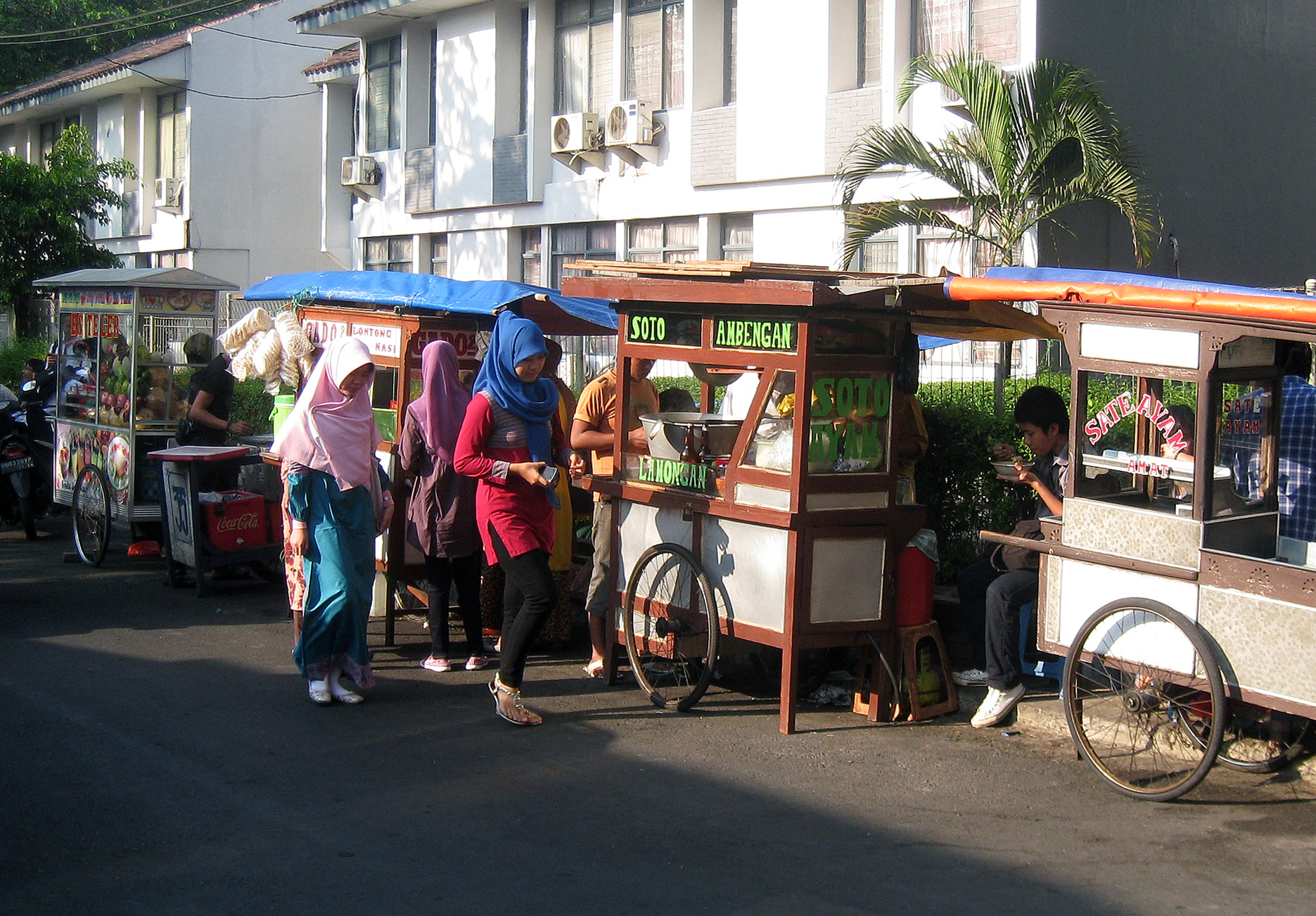
Food carts lining a street in Jakarta, Indonesia, selling street foods

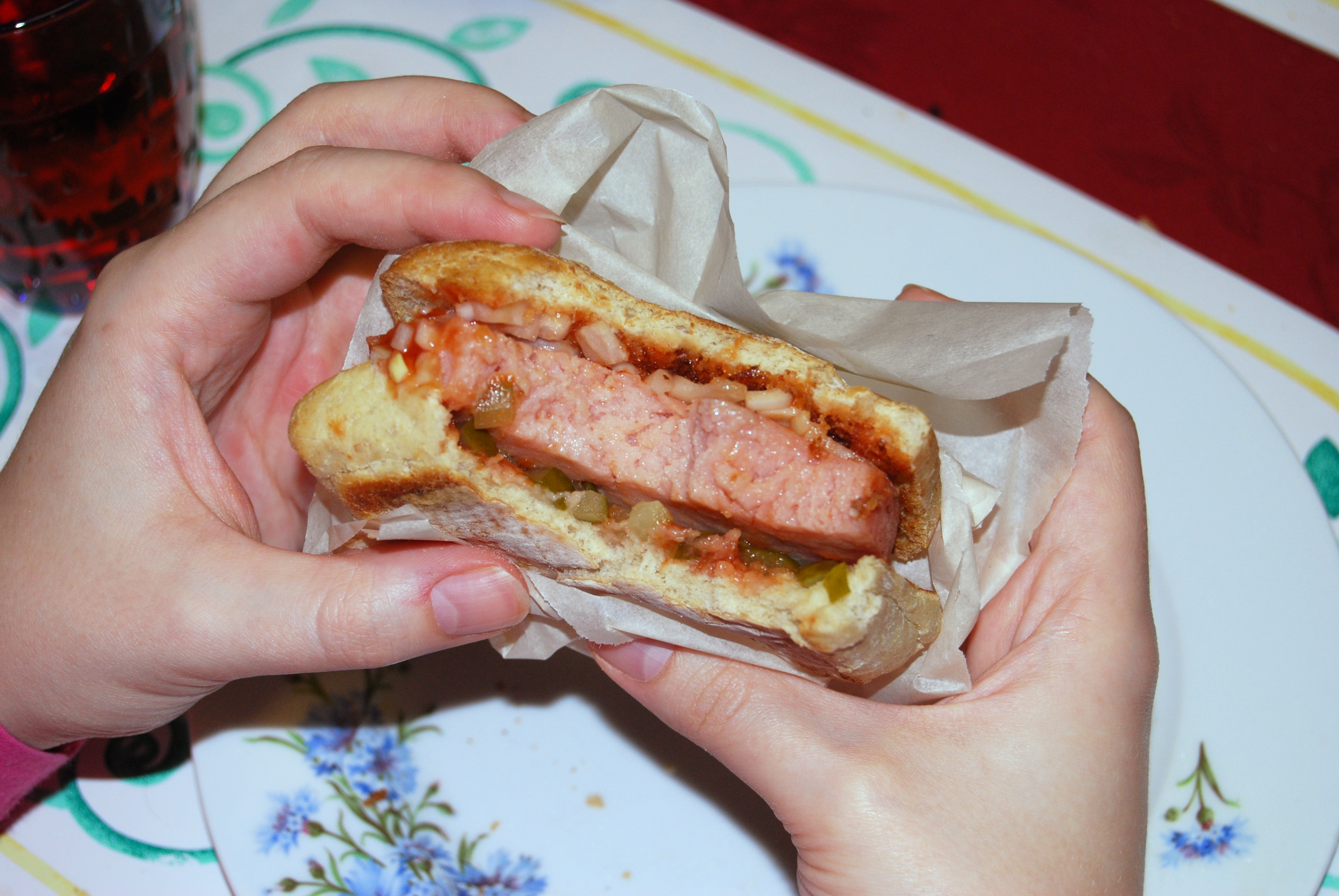
Porilainen, a Finnish burger-like sandwich

Street food vending is found all around the world and varies greatly between regions and cultures.

Dorling Kindersley describes the street food of Vietnam as being "fresh and lighter than many of the cuisines in the area" and "draw[ing] heavily on herbs, Chile peppers and lime," while street food of Thailand is "fiery" and "pungent with shrimp paste and fish sauce." Street food in Thailand offers a varied selection of ready-to-eat meals, snacks, fruits and drinks. The capital of Thailand, Bangkok, has been listed as one of the best places for street food. Popular street offerings in Bangkok include Pad Thai (stir fried rice noodle), green papaya salad, sour tom yum soup, Thai curries and mango sticky rice.

Indonesian street food is a diverse mix of local Indonesian, Chinese, and Dutch influences. Indonesian street food is often strongly flavored and spicy. Much of the street food in Indonesia is fried, such as fritters, nasi goreng and ayam goreng. Bakso (meatball soup), satay (skewered chicken) and gado-gado (vegetable salad served in peanut sauce) are also popular.

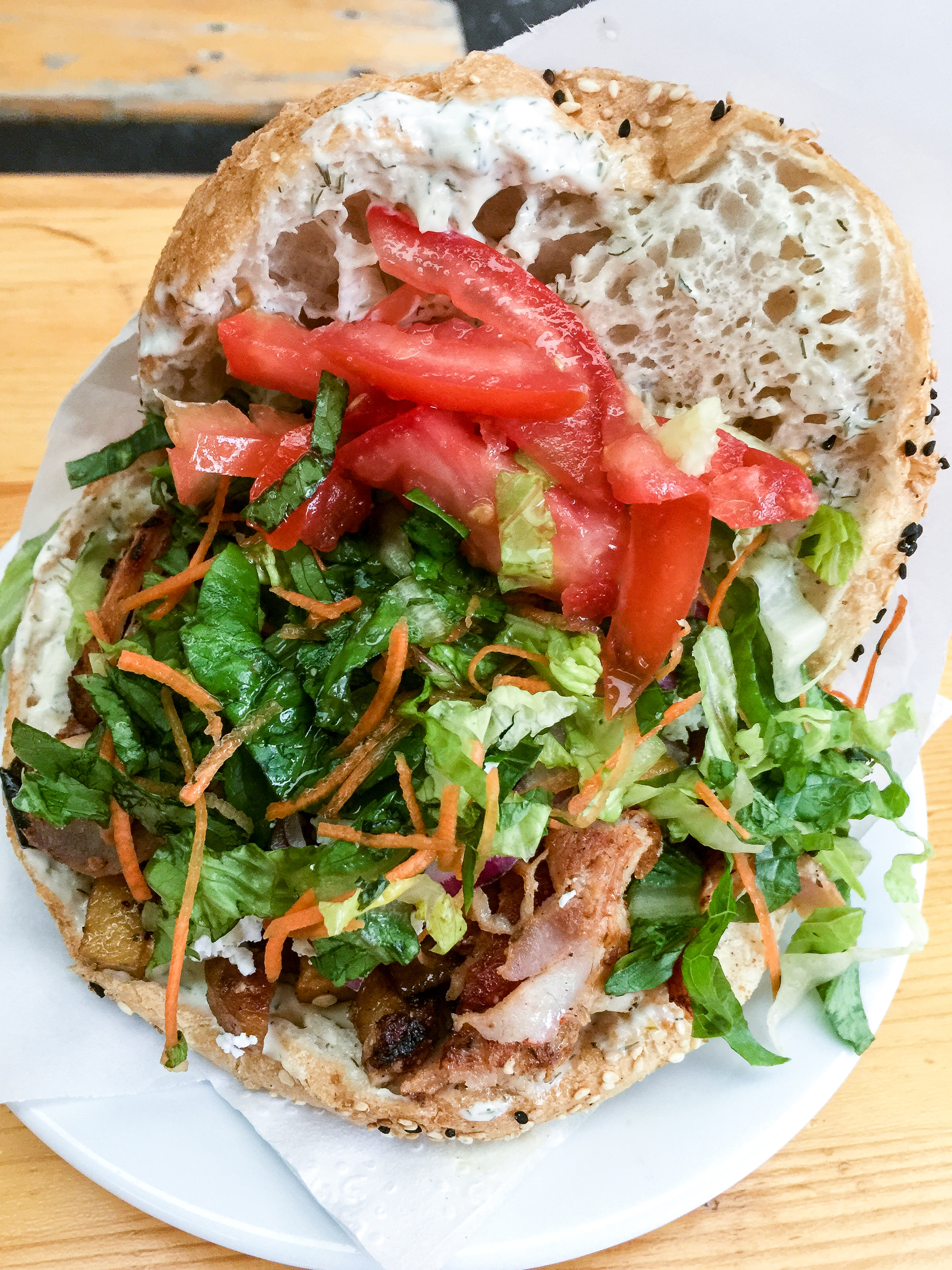
Doner kebab, an originally Turkish dish that found popularity in Germany

Indian street food is as diverse as Indian cuisine. Some of the more popular street food dishes are vada pav, misal pav, chole bhature, parathas, bhel puri, sev puri, gol gappa (also called pani puri in Karnatake and Maharashtra or puchka in West Bengal) aloo tikki, kebabs, tandoori chicken, samosas, kachori, idli, pohe, egg bhurji, pav bhaji, pulaw, pakora, lassi, kulfi and falooda. In Hindi-speaking regions of India, street food is popularly known as nukkadwala food ("corner" food). In South India, foods like mirchi bajji, punugulu, and mokkajonna (corn roasted on coal) are common street foods, along with breakfast items like idli, dosa and bonda. Other popular Asian fusion street food include gobi manchurian, momos and omelette. While some vendors streamline the recipes of popular dishes to sell them on the street, several restaurants have taken their inspiration from the street food of India.

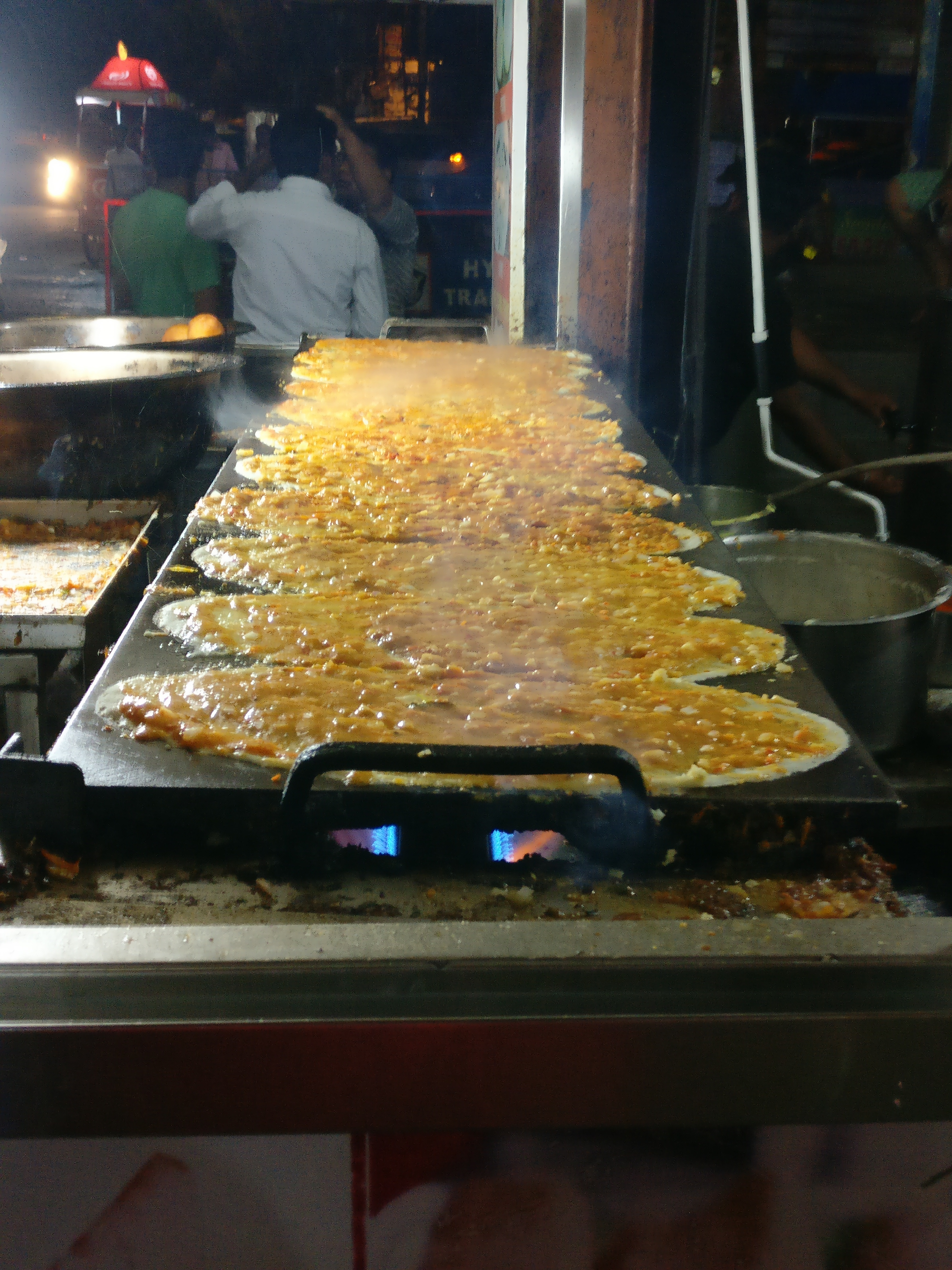
Street food in Hyderabad, India

Falafel is a popular dish in the Middle East. Vendors sell it on street corners in Syria, Egypt, and Israel. Another food sold commonly on the street in Egypt is ful, a slow-cooked fava bean dish.

In Denmark, sausage wagons allow passers-by to purchase sausages and hot dogs.

In Turkey, chicken shawarma is widely enjoyed in wraps called dürüm, served with toum and fresh vegetables.

In Jamaica a traditional dish is Jamaican jerk chicken. The original marinade calls for ingredients such as Scotch bonnet peppers, allspice berries and sometimes wood from laurel trees.

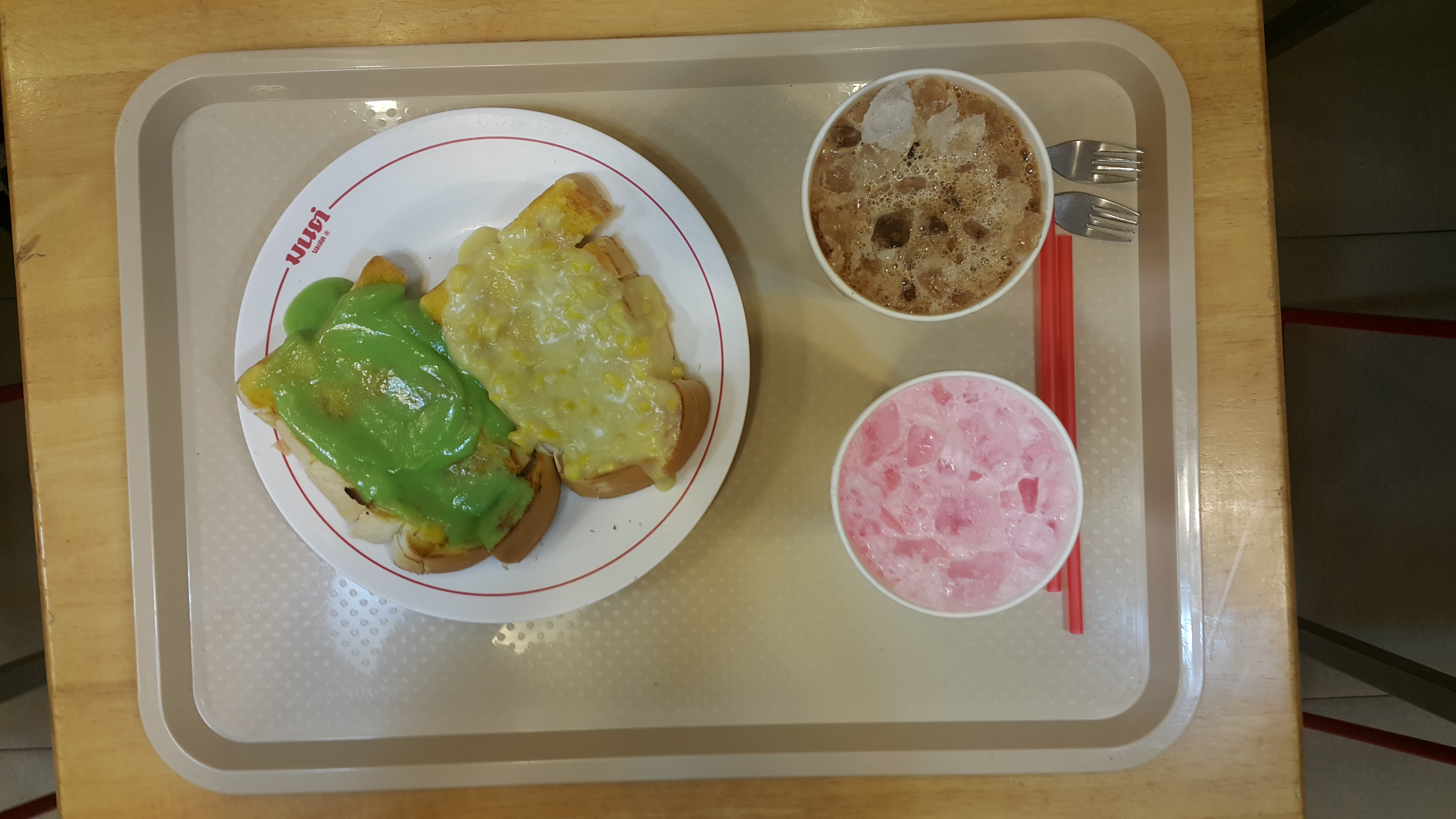
Grilled bread with jam served with sweetened milk in Bangkok

Mexican street food is known as antojitos (translated as "little cravings") and features several varieties of tacos, such as tacos al pastor, as well as huaraches and other maize-based foods.

New York City's signature street food is the hot dog, but New York street food also includes everything from Middle Eastern falafel to Jamaican jerk chicken to Belgian waffles.

In Hawaii, the local street food tradition of "plate lunch" (rice, macaroni salad, and a portion of meat) was inspired by the bento of the Japanese who had been brought to Hawaii as plantation workers.

== Cultural and economic aspects ==
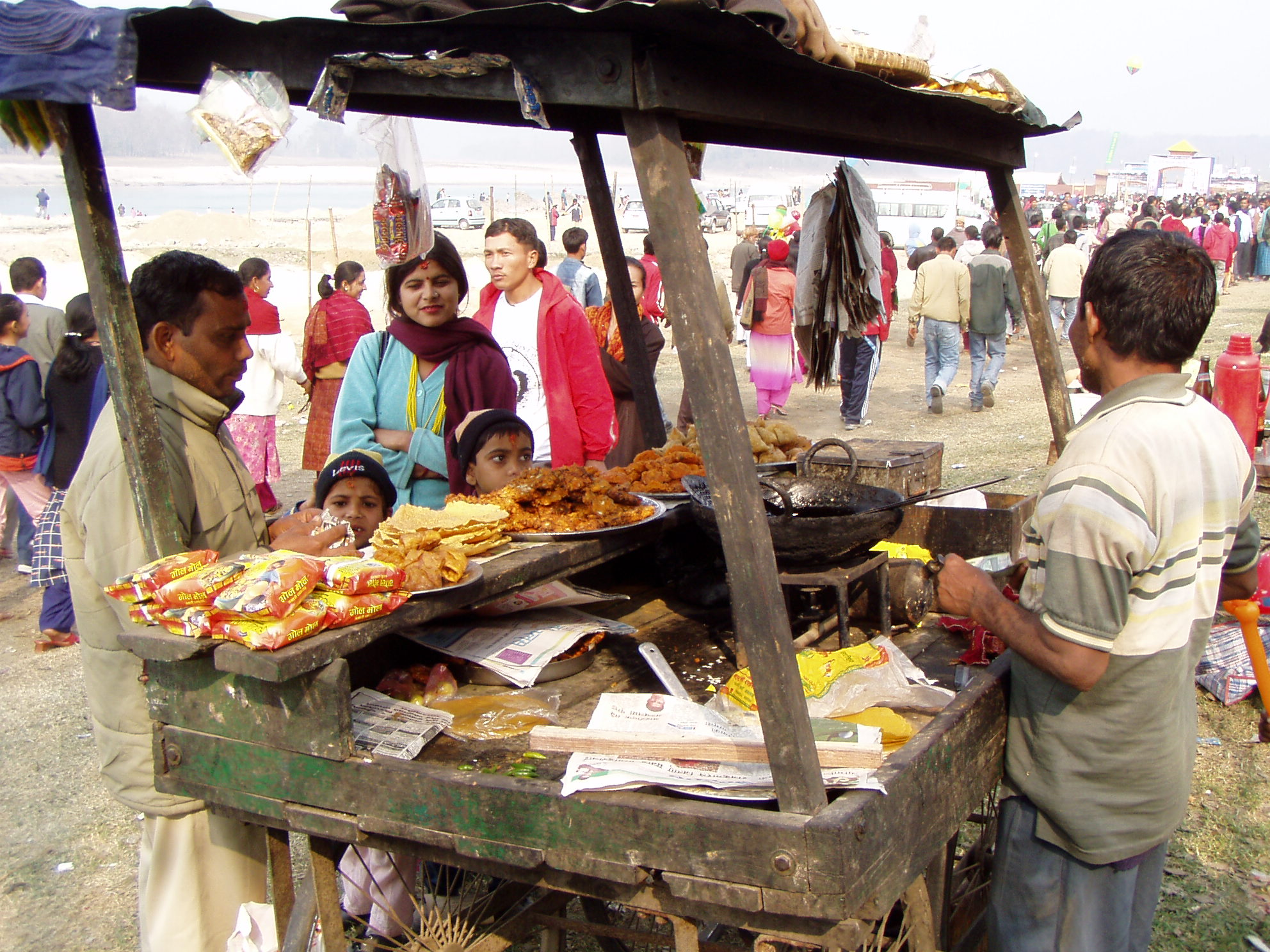
Street vendor of snack foods in Nepal

Because of differences in culture, social stratification, and history, the ways in which family street vendor enterprises are traditionally created and run vary in different areas of the world. Often, women's success in the street food market depends on trends of gender equality. This is evidenced in Bangladesh, where few women are street vendors. However, in Nigeria and Thailand, women dominate the street food trade.

Doreen Fernandez says Filipino cultural attitudes towards meals affect the street food phenomenon in the Philippines, because eating street food outside does not conflict with eating at one's house, which typically lacks dedicated eating rooms.

Other cultural phenomena that affect the street food market include the cultural implications of eating while walking down the street. In some cultures, this is considered to be rude, such as Japanese or Swahili cultures. Despite not being allowed for adults, it is culturally acceptable for children to do. In India, Henrike Donner wrote about a "marked distinction between food that could be eaten outside, especially by women," and the food prepared and eaten at home, with some non-Indian food being too "strange" or tied too closely to non-vegetarian preparation methods to be made at home.

In Tanzania's Dar es Salaam region, street food vendors produce economic benefits beyond their families. Because street food vendors purchase local fresh foods, urban gardens and small-scale farms in the area have expanded. In the United States, street food vendors are credited with supporting New York City's rapid growth by supplying meals for the city's merchants and workers. Proprietors of street food in the United States have had a goal of upward mobility, moving from selling on the street to their own shops. However, in Mexico, an increase in street vendors has been seen as a sign of deteriorating economic conditions in which food vending is the only employment opportunity that unskilled labor who have migrated from rural areas to urban areas are able to find.

In 2002, Coca-Cola reported that China, India, and Nigeria, where the company's expansion efforts included training and equipping mobile street vendors to sell its products, were some of their fastest-growing markets.

The libertarian Reason magazine states that in US cities, food trucks are subject to regulations designed to prevent them from competing with brick and mortar restaurants. For example, in Chicago, a regulation prevents food trucks "...from selling food within 200 feet of brick-and-mortar restaurants and, hence, prohibit them from operating throughout the city's downtown area," which critics have called an "anti-competitive" rule for food truck operators.

Since 1984, Folsom Street Fair in San Francisco is home of one of the most diverse street food fairs. In addition to much leather, and people in various states of dress and undress, the event features an outdoor food court serving a variety of street food. For donations of $10 or more, visitors get a $2 discount on each drink purchased at the fair. In 2018, the street photographer Michael Rababy documented it in his book, Folsom Street Food Court.

Netflix has also featured the street foods of the world through its TV series Street Food, with the first volume focusing on Asia, and the second on Latin America.

== Health and safety ==
As early as the 14th century, government officials oversaw street food vendor activities. With the increasing pace of globalization and tourism, the safety of street food has become one of the major concerns of public health, and a focus for governments and scientists to raise public awareness. However, despite concerns about contamination at street food vendors, the incidence of such is low, with studies showing rates comparable to restaurants.

In Singapore, street food vendors known as "hawkers", over half of which were unlicensed, were considered "primarily a nuisance to be removed from the streets". 113 hawker centers were constructed between 1971 and 1986 to remove hawkers from the streets while preserving the food culture.

In 2002, a sampling of 511 street foods in Ghana by the World Health Organization showed that most had microbial counts within the accepted limits, and a different sampling of 15 street foods in Calcutta showed that they were "nutritionally well balanced", providing roughly 200 kcal (Cal) of energy per rupee of cost.

In the United Kingdom, the Food Standards Agency has provided comprehensive guidance of food safety for the vendors, traders and retailers of the street food sector since 2000. Other effective ways of enhancing the safety of street foods include: mystery shopping programs, training, rewarding programs to vendors, regulatory governing and membership management programs, and technical testing programs.

In India, the government recognized the fundamental rights of the street food vendors and have imposed reasonable restrictions. And in 2006, the India legislature enacted the Food Safety and Standards Act to monitor the quality of food.

Despite knowledge of the risk factors, actual harm to consumers’ health is yet to be fully proven and understood. Due to difficulties in tracking cases and the lack of disease-reporting systems, follow-up studies proving actual connections between street food consumption and food-borne diseases are still very few. Little attention has been devoted to consumers and their eating habits, behaviors and awareness. The fact that social and geographical origins largely determine consumers’ physiological adaptation and reaction to foods—whether contaminated or not—is neglected in the literature.

In the late 1990s, the United Nations and other organizations began to recognize that street vendors had been an underused method of delivering fortified foods to populations, and in 2007, the UN Food and Agriculture Organization recommended considering methods of adding nutrients and supplements to street foods that are commonly consumed by the particular culture.

== See also ==
- List of street foods
- List of snack foods
- Snack food
- Pakistani food streets
- Street market
- Catering
- Mobile catering
- Food truck
- Yatai
- Pojangmacha
- Ice cream van
- Dude food
