= Pakistani food streets =

Pedestrianised area designated for restaurants and cafes

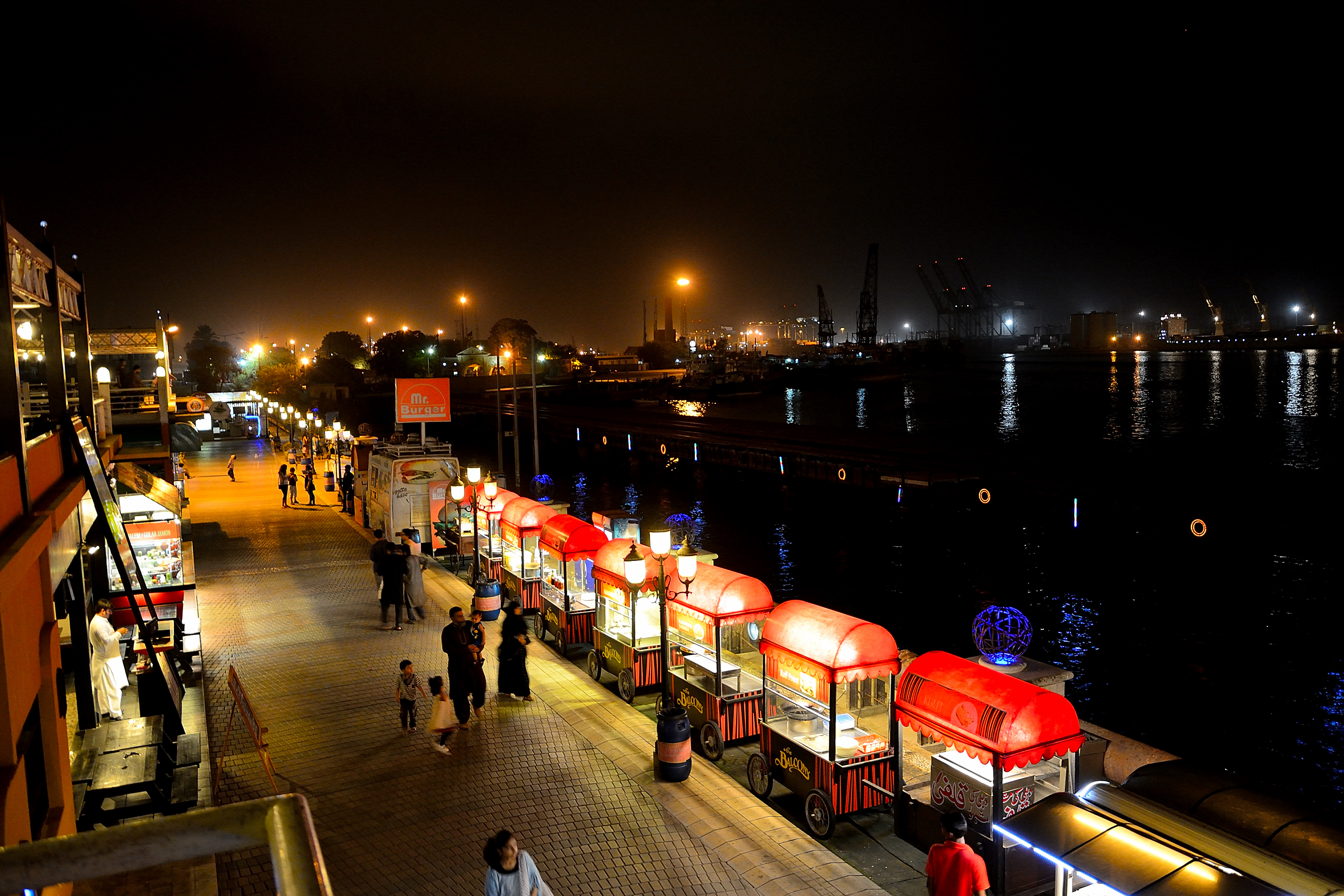
Located on the bank of Arabian Sea in Karachi, Port Grand is one of the largest food streets of Asia.

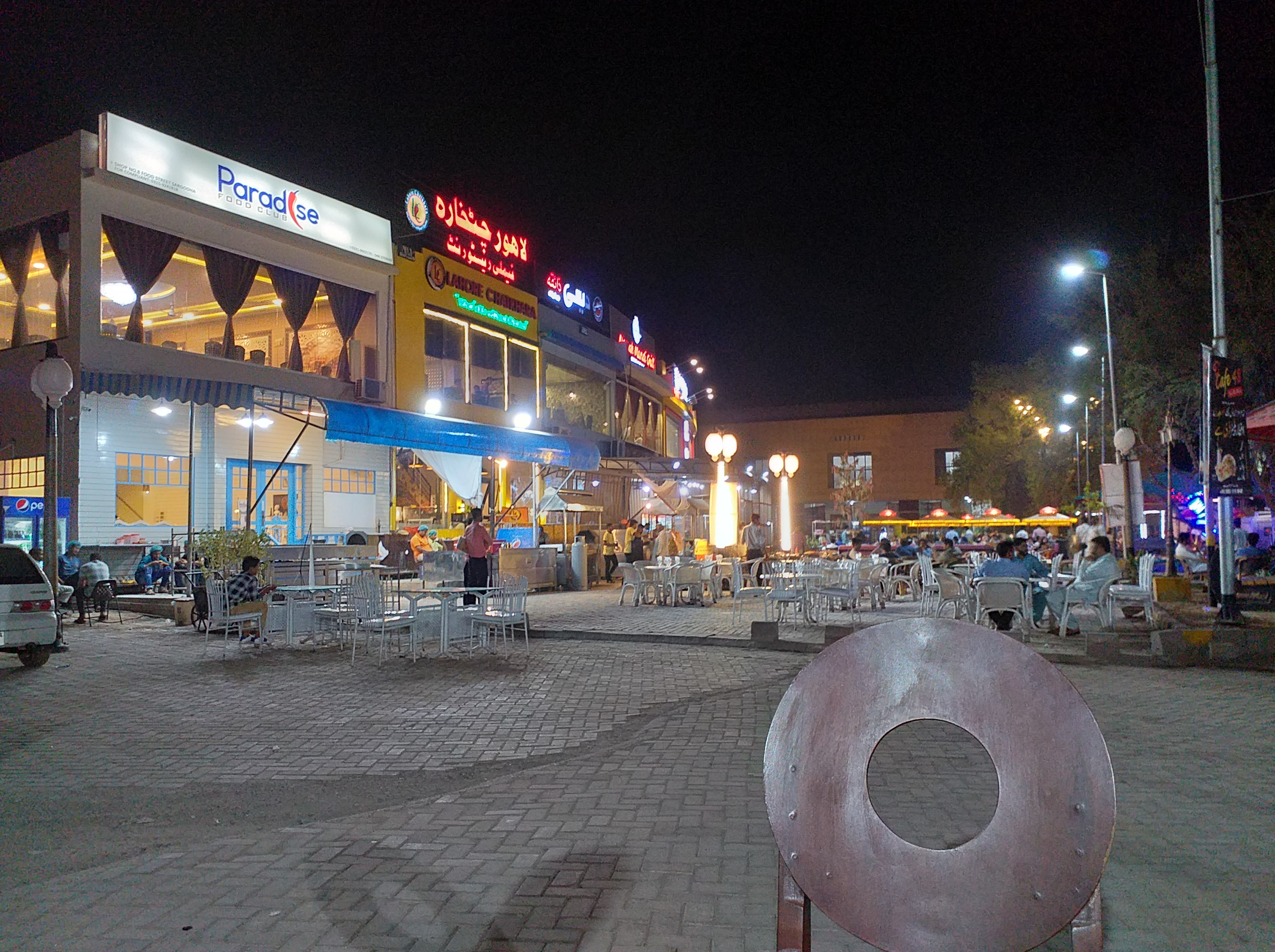
Food street located on Stadium Road, Sargodha

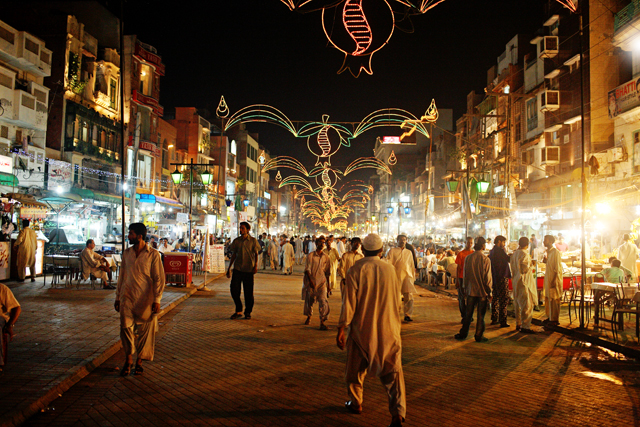
The Anarkali Food Street in Lahore, Pakistan

A food street is a street lined with many food stalls, restaurants, and other food shops, and typically pedestrianized. Food streets and food parks exist in several cities in Pakistan, and visiting them has become popular, with people using them as both formal and informal meeting areas.

The first food street in Pakistan was Gawalmandi Food Street located in the central part of Lahore. This has been followed by Melody Food Street and the food street in Blue Area in Islamabad, Burns Road in Karachi, the food street near Ghantar Ghar in Peshawar, Qissa Kahwani Bazaar Food Street, Peshawar and a second food street in Lahore at Anarkali. In 2012, a new food street was inaugurated in Lahore near Badshahi Mosque and Lahore Fort. It was named Fort Road Food Street.

In Islamabad, prior to the creation of Melody Food Street, restaurants were scattered around the city. Members of the middle class society prefer them because they are less expensive than hotels or high-quality restaurants.

== See also ==
- Street food
- List of restaurant districts and streets
